= 2015 Copa Sudamericana finals =

- Event: 2015 Copa Sudamericana
Huracán	Santa Fe
(Argentina)	(Colombia)
0	0
- on aggregate Santa Fe won 3–1 on penalties

First leg
Huracán	Santa Fe
0	0
- Date: 2 December 2015
- Venue: Estadio Tomás Adolfo Ducó, Buenos Aires
- Referee: Antonio Arias (Paraguay)

Second leg
Santa Fe	Huracán
0	0
- After extra time
- Date: 9 December 2015
- Venue: Estadio El Campín, Bogotá
- Referee: Héber Lopes (Brazil)

The 2015 Copa Sudamericana finals were the two-legged final that decided the winner of the 2015 Copa Sudamericana, the 14th edition of the Copa Sudamericana, South America's secondary international club football tournament organized by CONMEBOL.

The finals were contested in two-legged home-and-away format between Argentine team Huracán and Colombian team Santa Fe. The first leg was hosted by Huracán at Estadio Tomás Adolfo Ducó in Buenos Aires on 2 December 2015, while the second leg was hosted by Santa Fe at Estadio El Campín in Bogotá on 9 December. The winner qualified for the 2016 Copa Libertadores, and earned the right to play against the 2015 Copa Libertadores winners in the 2016 Recopa Sudamericana, and against the 2015 J. League Cup winners in the 2016 Suruga Bank Championship.

As both the first leg and the second leg were tied 0–0, the champion was decided by penalty shoot-out in which Santa Fe won 3–1, winning the tournament for the first time in their history.

== Teams ==
Team	Previous finals appearances (bold indicates winners)
(Argentina) Huracán	None
(Colombia) Santa Fe	None

== Venues ==
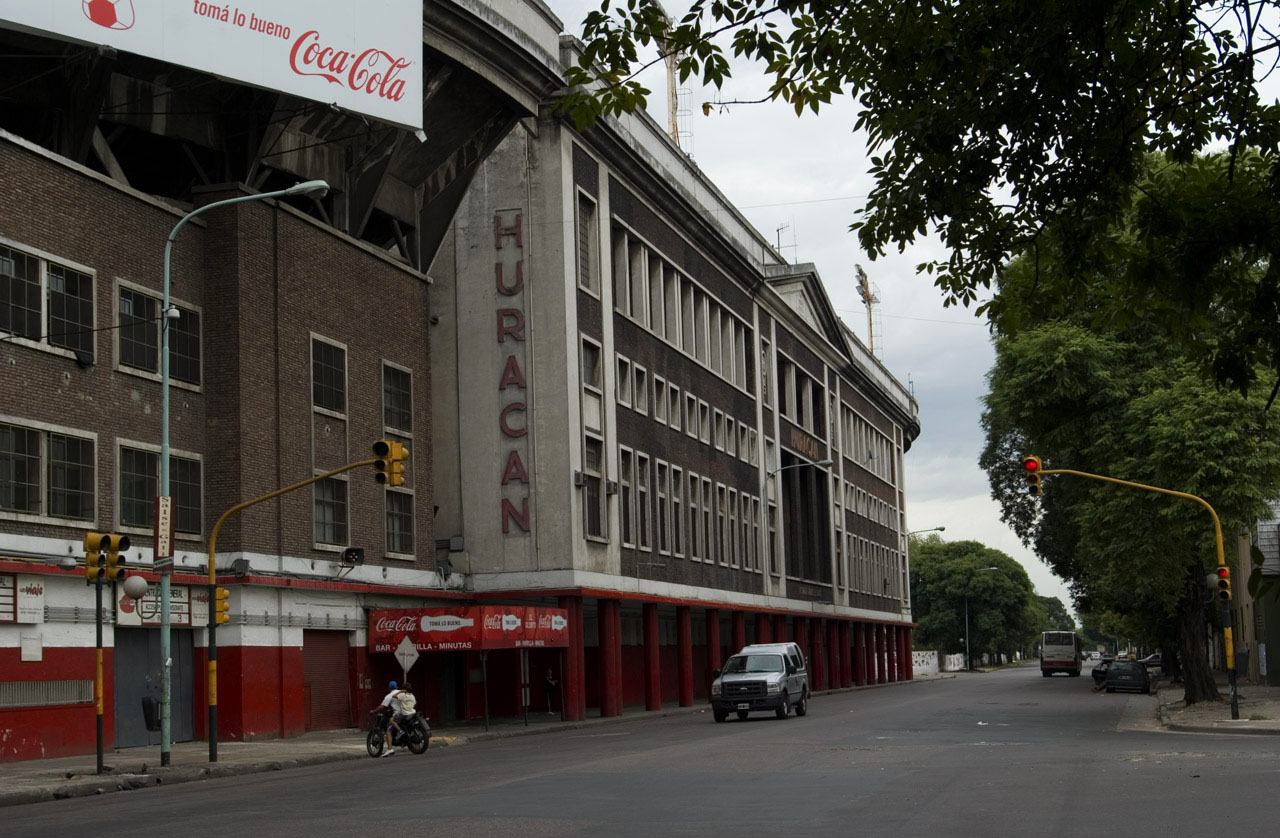
Estadio Tomás Ducó in Buenos Aires, Argentina, hosted the first leg

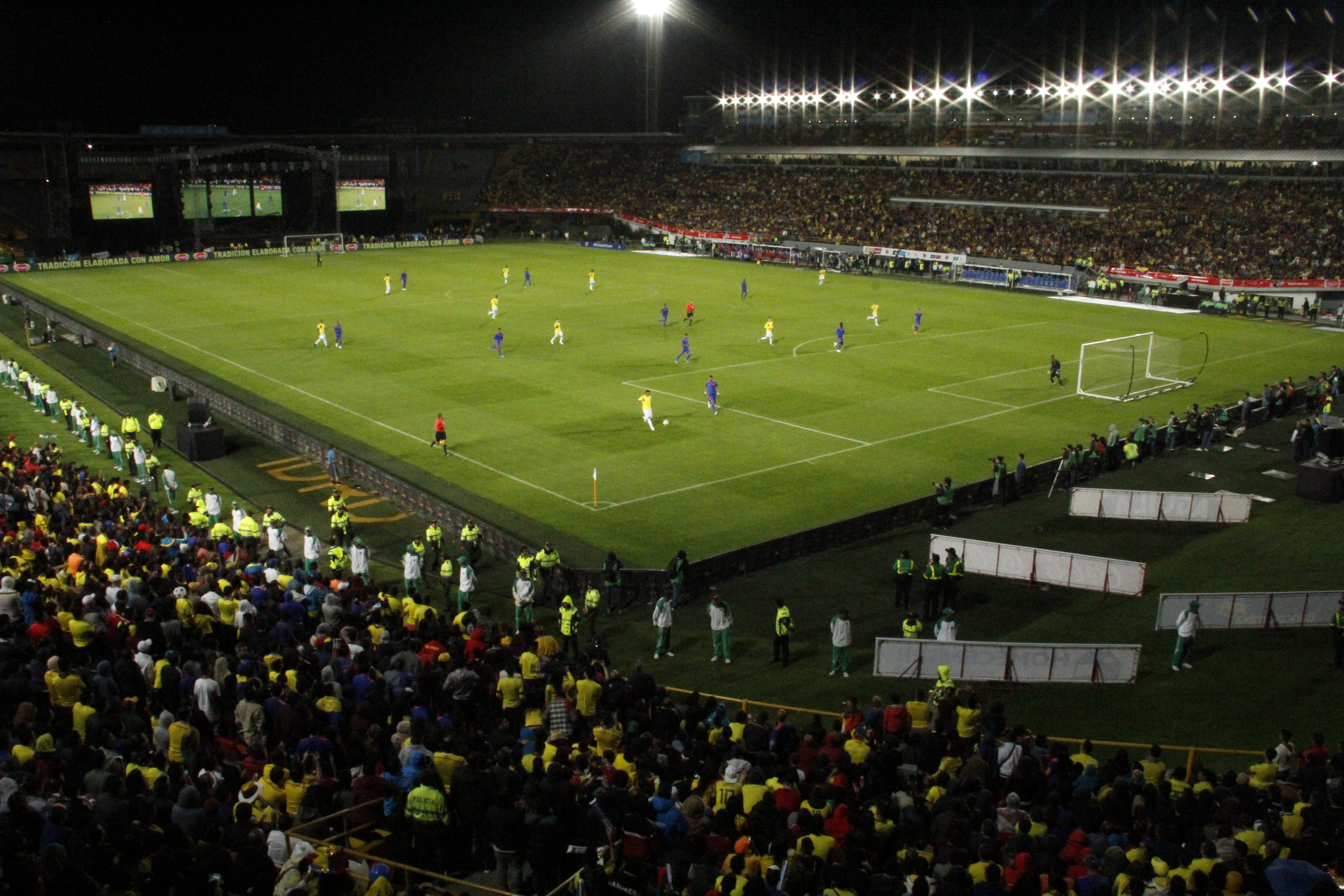
Estadio El Campín in Bogotá, Colombia, hosted the second leg

== Road to the finals ==
Note: In all scores below, the score of the home team is given first.

(Argentina) Huracán			Round	(Colombia) Santa Fe		
Opponent	Venue	Score	Elimination stages	Opponent	Venue	Score
Bye			First stage	(Ecuador) LDU Loja (won 3–0 on aggregate)	Away	0–0
Bye			First stage	(Ecuador) LDU Loja (won 3–0 on aggregate)	Home	3–0
(Argentina) Tigre (won 6–2 on aggregate)	Away	2–5	Second stage	(Uruguay) Nacional (won 2–1 on aggregate)	Away	0–2
(Argentina) Tigre (won 6–2 on aggregate)	Home	1–0	Second stage	(Uruguay) Nacional (won 2–1 on aggregate)	Home	0–1
**Seed 7**			final stages	**Seed 3**		
(Brazil) Sport Recife (won 4–1 on aggregate)	Away	1–1	Round of 16	(Ecuador) Emelec (tied 2–2 on aggregate, won on away goals)	Away	2–1
(Brazil) Sport Recife (won 4–1 on aggregate)	Home	3–0	Round of 16	(Ecuador) Emelec (tied 2–2 on aggregate, won on away goals)	Home	1–0
(Uruguay) Defensor Sporting (won 1–0 on aggregate)	Home	1–0	Quarter-finals	(Argentina) Independiente (won 2–1 on aggregate)	Away	0–1
(Uruguay) Defensor Sporting (won 1–0 on aggregate)	Away	0–0	Quarter-finals	(Argentina) Independiente (won 2–1 on aggregate)	Home	1–1
(Argentina) River Plate (won 3–2 on aggregate)	Away	0–1	Semi-finals	(Paraguay) Sportivo Luqueño (tied 1–1 on aggregate, won on away goals)	Away	1–1
(Argentina) River Plate (won 3–2 on aggregate)	Home	2–2	Semi-finals	(Paraguay) Sportivo Luqueño (tied 1–1 on aggregate, won on away goals)	Home	0–0

== Format ==
The finals were played on a home-and-away two-legged basis, with the higher-seeded team hosting the second leg. If tied on aggregate, the away goals rule would not be used, and 30 minutes of extra time would be played. If still tied after extra time, the penalty shoot-out would be used to determine the winner.

== Matches ==
=== First leg ===
2 December 2015
21:00 UTC−3

Huracán (Argentina)	0–0	(Colombia) Santa Fe
	Report

Estadio Tomás Adolfo Ducó, Buenos Aires
Referee: Antonio Arias (Paraguay)

**Huracán**	**Santa Fe**

GK	1	(Argentina) Marcos Díaz
RB	13	(Argentina) José San Román
CB	21	(Argentina) Hugo Nervo (c)
CB	2	(Argentina) Federico Mancinelli	(yellow card) 28'
LB	15	(Argentina) Luciano Balbi
RM	26	(Argentina) Mauro Bogado
CM	5	(Argentina) Federico Vismara	(yellow card) 30'
LM	18	(Argentina) Patricio Toranzo
AM	30	(Argentina) Daniel Montenegro		(substituted off) 81'
CF	7	(Argentina) Cristian Espinoza		(substituted off) 61'
CF	9	(Argentina) Ramón Ábila
Substitutes:
GK	22	(Argentina) Matías Giordano
DF	3	(Argentina) Carlos Arano
DF	19	(Argentina) Santiago Echeverría
MF	8	(Argentina) Lucas Villarruel
MF	16	(Spain) Iván Moreno y Fabianesi
MF	20	(Argentina) David Distéfano		(substituted on) 81'
FW	24	(Argentina) Ezequiel Miralles	(yellow card) 82'	(substituted on) 61'
Manager:
(Argentina) Eduardo Domínguez

GK	1	(Colombia) Róbinson Zapata
RB	18	(Colombia) Almir Soto
CB	21	(Colombia) Francisco Meza
CB	26	(Colombia) Yerry Mina
LB	11	(Colombia) Leyvin Balanta	(yellow card) 67'
RM	5	(Colombia) Yulián Anchico (c)		(substituted off) 89'
CM	30	(Colombia) Yeison Gordillo
CM	14	(Colombia) Baldomero Perlaza
LM	20	(Venezuela) Luis Manuel Seijas	(yellow card) 38'
CF	19	(Colombia) Wilson Morelo		(substituted off) 73'
CF	28	(Ecuador) Daniel Angulo		(substituted off) 84'
Substitutes:
GK	22	(Colombia) Leandro Castellanos
DF	3	(Panama) Harold Cummings
DF	4	(Colombia) Sergio Otálvaro	(yellow card) 90'	(substituted on) 89'
MF	8	(Colombia) Dario Rodríguez Parra
MF	10	(Argentina) Omar Pérez		(substituted on) 84'
MF	13	(Colombia) Sebastián Salazar
FW	9	(Colombia) Miguel Borja		(substituted on) 73'
Manager:
(Uruguay) Gerardo Pelusso

Assistant referees:
Eduardo Cardozo (Paraguay)
Milcíades Saldívar (Paraguay)
Fourth official:
Ulises Mereles (Paraguay)

=== Second leg ===
9 December 2015
19:00 UTC−5

Santa Fe (Colombia)	0–0 (a.e.t.)	(Argentina) Huracán
	Report
Penalties
Pérez (penalty scored); Seijas (penalty scored); Balanta (penalty scored)	3–1	(penalty missed) Bogado; (penalty missed) Nervo; (penalty scored) Mancinelli; (penalty missed) Toranzo

Estadio El Campín, Bogotá
Referee: Héber Lopes (Brazil)

**Santa Fe**	**Huracán**

GK	1	(Colombia) Róbinson Zapata
RB	5	(Colombia) Yulián Anchico (c)		(substituted off) 107'
CB	21	(Colombia) Francisco Meza
CB	26	(Colombia) Yerry Mina
LB	11	(Colombia) Leyvin Balanta
RM	17	(Colombia) Juan Daniel Roa
CM	30	(Colombia) Yeison Gordillo		(substituted off) 71'
CM	14	(Colombia) Baldomero Perlaza
LM	20	(Venezuela) Luis Manuel Seijas	(yellow card) 90+4'
CF	19	(Colombia) Wilson Morelo
CF	28	(Ecuador) Daniel Angulo		(substituted off) 46'
Substitutes:
GK	22	(Colombia) Leandro Castellanos
DF	3	(Panama) Harold Cummings
DF	4	(Colombia) Sergio Otálvaro		(substituted on) 107'
MF	8	(Colombia) Dario Rodríguez Parra
MF	10	(Argentina) Omar Pérez		(substituted on) 71'
MF	18	(Colombia) Almir Soto
FW	9	(Colombia) Miguel Borja	(yellow card) 118'	(substituted on) 46'
Manager:
(Uruguay) Gerardo Pelusso

GK	1	(Argentina) Marcos Díaz
RB	13	(Argentina) José San Román
CB	2	(Argentina) Federico Mancinelli
CB	21	(Argentina) Hugo Nervo (c)
LB	15	(Argentina) Luciano Balbi
CM	5	(Argentina) Federico Vismara
CM	26	(Argentina) Mauro Bogado
RW	7	(Argentina) Cristian Espinoza	(yellow card) 88'	(substituted off) 96'
AM	30	(Argentina) Daniel Montenegro		(substituted off) 76'
LW	18	(Argentina) Patricio Toranzo
CF	9	(Argentina) Ramón Ábila	(red card) 116'
Substitutes:
GK	22	(Argentina) Matías Giordano
DF	3	(Argentina) Carlos Arano		(substituted on) 119'
DF	19	(Argentina) Santiago Echeverría
MF	8	(Argentina) Lucas Villarruel
MF	16	(Spain) Iván Moreno y Fabianesi
MF	20	(Argentina) David Distéfano		(substituted on) 76'
FW	11	(Argentina) Agustín Torassa		(substituted on) 96' (substituted off) 119'
Manager:
(Argentina) Eduardo Domínguez

Assistant referees:
Kleber Gil (Brazil)
Bruno Boschilia (Brazil)
Fourth official:
Péricles Bassols (Brazil)

== See also ==
- 2016 Recopa Sudamericana
- 2016 Suruga Bank Championship
