= Juan Daniel Roa =

Colombian footballer (born 1991)

Personal information
- Full name: Juan Daniel Roa Reyes
- Date of birth: 20 August 1991 (age 35)
- Place of birth: Bogotá, Colombia
- Height: 1.75 m (5 ft 9 in)
- Position: Midfielder

Youth career
- 2007–2010: Santa Fe

Senior career*
Years	Team	Apps	(Gls)
2010–2019	Santa Fe	277	(6)
2020	Deportivo Cali	14	(0)
2021	Alianza	5	(0)
2023	Santa Fe	11	(0)

International career
2018	Colombia	2	(0)
- * Club domestic league appearances and goals

Juan Daniel Roa Reyes (born 20 August 1991) is a Colombian former professional footballer who played as a midfielder.

== Club career ==
Born in Bogotá, Roa began his career playing for Santa Fe's youth set-up after catching the eye of club president César Pastrana. Following an impressive youth career with the club, Roa was promoted to the first team in 2010 and played for Santa Fe for nine years, winning three league titles, three Superligas, the Copa Sudamericana in 2015, and the 2016 Suruga Bank Championship.

After his contract with Santa Fe expired at the end of 2019, on 11 January 2020 Roa joined Deportivo Cali under a one-year contract.

== Career statistics ==
=== Club ===
As of 11 February 2020

Club performance		League		Cup		Continental		Other		Total	
Club	Season	Apps	Goals	Apps	Goals	Apps	Goals	Apps	Goals	Apps	Goals
Santa Fe	2010	1	0	0	0	0	0	—		1	0
Santa Fe	2011	33	0	9	0	7 (Note: Appearances in the Copa Sudamericana)	0	—		49	0
Santa Fe	2012	34	1	5	0	0	0	—		39	1
Santa Fe	2013	36	1	5	0	6 (Note: Appearances in the Copa Libertadores)	0	2 (Note: Appearances in the Superliga Colombiana)	0	49	1
Santa Fe	2014	37	1	11	0	3	0	—		51	1
Santa Fe	2015	26	1	8	1	10	1	2	0	57	4
Santa Fe	2015	26	1	8	1	11	1	2	0	57	4
Santa Fe	2016	27	0	4	0	6	0	1 (Note: Appearances in the Suruga Bank Championship)	0	42	0
Santa Fe	2016	27	0	4	0	2	0	1	0	42	0
Santa Fe	2016	27	0	4	0	2 (Note: Appearances in the Recopa Sudamericana)	0	1	0	42	0
Santa Fe	2017	34	1	3	0	6	0	2	0	48	1
Santa Fe	2017	34	1	3	0	3	0	2	0	48	1
Santa Fe	2018	22	1	1	0	6	0	—		36	1
Santa Fe	2018	22	1	1	0	7	0	—		36	1
Santa Fe	2019	27	0	3	0	0	0	—		30	0
Santa Fe	Total	277	6	49	1	69	2	7	0	402	9
Deportivo Cali	2020	2	0	0	0	1	0	—		3	0
Career total		279	6	49	1	70	2	7	0	405	9

== Honours ==
=== Club ===
Santa Fe

- Copa Sudamericana: 2015
- Categoría Primera A: 2012-I, 2014-II, 2016–II
- Superliga Colombiana: 2013, 2015, 2017
- Suruga Bank Championship: 2016
