= 2014 Supercopa Argentina =

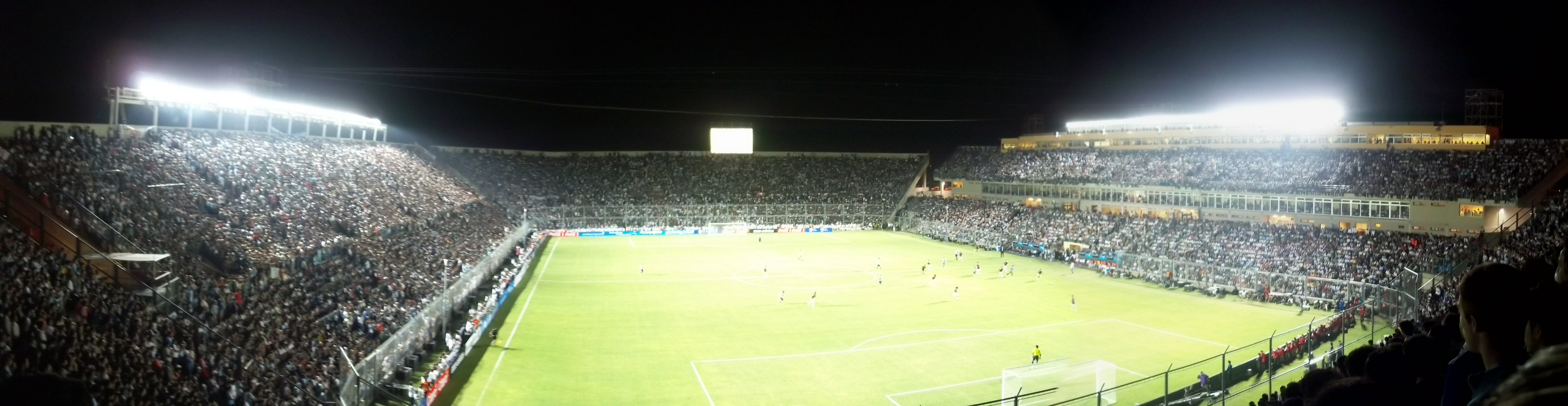
- Estadio San Juan del Bicentenario, venue
River Plate	Huracán
0	1
- Date: April 25, 2015
- Venue: Estadio San Juan del Bicentenario, San Juan
- Referee: Néstor Pitana

The 2014 Supercopa Argentina Final was the 3rd edition of the Supercopa, an annual football match contested by the winners of the Argentine Primera División and Copa Argentina competitions. Huracán beat River Plate 1–0 in San Juan and won the Argentine Supercup. As champions, Huracán qualified to the 2015 Copa Sudamericana.

== Qualified teams ==
Team	Qualification	Previous app.
River Plate	2013–14 Primera División champion	None
Huracán	2013–14 Copa Argentina champion	None

Bold indicates winning years

== Match ==
=== Details ===
April 25, 2015
21:10 UTC-3

River Plate	0–1	Huracán
	Report	Puch 21'

Estadio San Juan del Bicentenario, San Juan
Referee: Néstor Pitana

**River Plate**	**Huracán**

GK	1	(Argentina) Marcelo Barovero
DF	18	(Uruguay) Camilo Mayada		(substituted off) 83'
DF	2	(Argentina) Jonathan Maidana
DF	6	(Argentina) Ramiro Funes Mori
DF	21	(Argentina) Leonel Vangioni
MF	8	(Uruguay) Carlos Sánchez	(yellow card) 55'	(substituted off) 58'
MF	5	(Argentina) Matías Kranevitter	(yellow card) 62'
MF	16	(Argentina) Ariel Rojas		(substituted off) 63'
MF	10	(Argentina) Gonzalo Martínez
FW	7	(Uruguay) Rodrigo Mora
FW	9	(Argentina) Fernando Cavenaghi (c)
Substitutes:
GK	33	(Argentina) Julio Chiarini
DF	24	(Argentina) Emanuel Mammana
DF	20	(Argentina) Germán Pezzella
MF	14	(Argentina) Augusto Solari		(substituted on) 83'
MF	15	(Argentina) Leonardo Pisculichi		(substituted on) 58'
FW	31	(Argentina) Lucas Boyé
FW	32	(Argentina) Sebastián Driussi		(substituted on) 63'
Manager:
(Argentina) Marcelo Gallardo

GK	1	(Argentina) Marcos Díaz
DF	2	(Argentina) Federico Mancinelli
DF	21	(Argentina) Hugo Nervo
DF	25	(Argentina) Eduardo Domínguez (c)
DF	15	(Argentina) Luciano Balbi
MF	8	(Argentina) Lucas Villarruel	(yellow card) 90+5'
MF	5	(Argentina) Federico Vismara	(yellow card) 63'
MF	7	(Argentina) Cristian Espinoza		(substituted off) 74'
MF	18	(Argentina) Patricio Toranzo		(substituted off) 80'
MF	17	(Chile) Edson Puch		(substituted off) 71'
FW	9	(Argentina) Ramón Ábila
Substitutes:
GK	22	(Argentina) Matías Giordano
DF	19	(Argentina) Santiago Echeverría
MF	14	(Argentina) Ezequiel Gallegos		(substituted on) 74'
MF	10	(Argentina) Kaku
MF	30	(Argentina) Daniel Montenegro
MF	16	(Argentina) Iván Moreno y Fabianesi		(substituted on) 80'
FW	11	(Argentina) Agustín Torassa		(substituted on) 71'
Manager:
(Argentina) Néstor Apuzzo

Assistant referees:
Sergio Zoratti
Diego Verlotta
Fourth official:
Fernando Espinoza

**Match rules**

- 90 minutes.
- Penalty shoot-out if scores still level.
- Seven named substitutes.
- Maximum of three substitutions.

=== Statistics ===
Overall
	River Plate	Huracán
Goals scored	0	1
Total shots	14	6
Shots on target	6	4
Ball possession	65%	35%
Corner kicks	16	5
Fouls committed	13	11
Offsides	1	2
Yellow cards	2	2
Red cards	0	0
