= Yerry Mina =

Colombian footballer (born 1994)

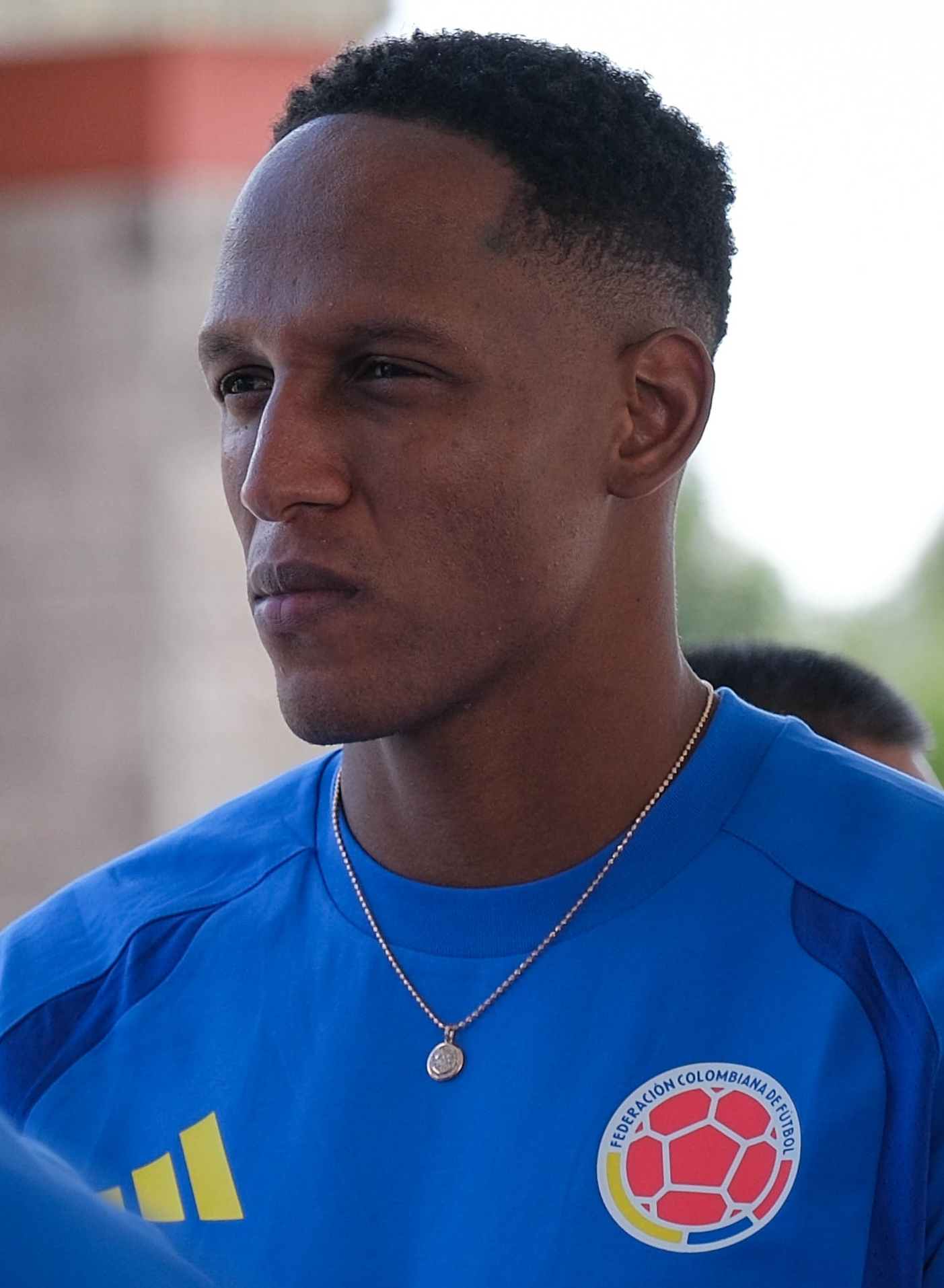
- Mina with Colombia in 2026

Personal information
- Full name: Yerry Fernando Mina González
- Date of birth: 23 September 1994 (age 32)
- Place of birth: Guachené, Colombia
- Height: 1.95 m (6 ft 5 in)
- Position: Centre-back

Team information
- Current team: Cagliari
- Number: 26

Youth career
- 2012–2013: Deportivo Pasto

Senior career*
Years	Team	Apps	(Gls)
2013–2014	Deportivo Pasto	19	(1)
2014–2016	Santa Fe	67	(7)
2016–2017	Palmeiras	28	(6)
2018	Barcelona	5	(0)
2018–2023	Everton	86	(7)
2023–2024	Fiorentina	4	(0)
2024–	Cagliari	71	(5)

International career^{‡}
2016	Colombia U23	4	(1)
2016–	Colombia	55	(8)
Medal record
Representing Colombia
Men's football
Copa América
Runner-up	2024 United States
Third place	2016 United States
Third place	2021 Brazil
- * Club domestic league appearances and goals as of 13:21, 25 May 2026 (UTC) ‡ National team caps and goals as of 22:36, 7 July 2026 (UTC)

Yerry Fernando Mina González (born 23 September 1994) is a Colombian professional footballer who plays as a centre-back for Serie A club Cagliari and the Colombia national team.

Mina began his career at Deportivo Pasto before joining Independiente Santa Fe in 2014, where he won the Categoría Primera A title, the 2015 Superliga Colombiana, and the 2015 Copa Sudamericana — during which he was named Young Player of the Year and included in the Team of the Year. In 2016, he transferred to Palmeiras, winning the Campeonato Brasileiro Série A and being voted Best Centre Back in Brazil. He joined Barcelona in 2018, winning La Liga and the Copa del Rey, before moving later that year to Everton in the Premier League, where he spent five seasons. After a brief spell at Fiorentina in 2023, he signed for Cagliari in 2024.

At international level, Mina represented the Colombia U23 before making his senior debut for the Colombia national team in 2016. He has earned over 50 caps and scored multiple goals as a centre-back, appearing at the 2018 FIFA World Cup where he was included in the FIFA World Cup Fantasy Team. Mina shares the record for most goals scored in a single World Cup by a defender. He also featured in the Copa América in 2016, 2019, and 2024 (where Colombia finished as runners-up), as well as the 2026 World Cup.

== Club career ==
=== Deportivo Pasto ===
Born in Guachené, in the Cauca Department of Colombia, Mina was a Deportivo Pasto youth graduate, joining the side only at the age of 18. Promoted to the first team ahead of the 2013 season, he made his professional debut on 20 March 2013 at the Estadio Pascual Guerrero in Cali — starting at centre-back in a 1–0 defeat to Depor F.C. (Atlético Cali) in the Copa Postobón — under head coach Flabio Torres.

Mina made his Categoría Primera A league debut on 15 September 2013, starting in a 0–0 draw away at Deportivo Cali at the Palmaseca stadium. He scored his first professional goal on 18 October 2013, opening the scoring in the 8th minute with a header in a 2–2 home draw against Atlético Huila.

Mina also featured in Pasto's run in the 2013 Copa Sudamericana, starting at centre-back in both legs of the round-of-16 tie against Brazilian side Ponte Preta. In the away first leg on 25 September 2013 at the Estádio Moisés Lucarelli in Campinas, Pasto lost 2–0, with Mina starting alongside Camilo Pérez at centre-back in a side that conceded to Uendel and Fellipe Bastos. In the return leg at the Estadio Departamental Libertad in Pasto on 22 October 2013, he started as Pasto won 1–0 through a 52nd-minute goal, but the club were eliminated 2–1 on aggregate. Across his entire 2013 season with Pasto, Mina made 24 appearances and scored once in the league, before departing to join Santa Fe in Bogotá.

=== Independiente Santa Fe ===
Mina joined Independiente Santa Fe of Bogotá in December 2013, initially on a one-year loan. He made his debut on 25 January 2014, playing the full 90 minutes in a 3–0 home victory over Rionegro Águilas in the Categoría Primera A.

==== 2014: Liga Finalización title ====
Mina established himself as first-choice centre-back under head coach Gustavo Costas during the 2014 Torneo Finalización season. He scored his first goal for the club in the quarter-finals against Once Caldas, converting in the 85th minute in a 1–2 home defeat to keep Santa Fe alive in the tie. He scored twice more in the Finalización — including goals against Deportes Tolima (5–0, 90th+2 minute) and against Millonarios in the Clásico Bogotano (4–1, 16th minute, header) — as Santa Fe advanced to the final. The final was contested between Santa Fe and Independiente Medellín: after winning the first leg 2–1 away at the Estadio Atanasio Girardot, Santa Fe drew 1–1 at home in the Estadio El Campín on 21 December 2014, winning 3–2 on aggregate to claim the club's eighth national championship.

==== 2015: Superliga, Copa Libertadores and Copa Sudamericana ====
In January 2015, Mina opened the scoring in the 33rd minute in Santa Fe's 2–0 home victory over Atlético Nacional in the second leg of the Superliga Colombiana final at El Campín, with Luis Páez adding a second on 59 minutes — overturning a 1–2 first-leg deficit to claim the title 3–2 on aggregate, the club's second Superliga triumph.

In the 2015 Copa Libertadores, Santa Fe were drawn into a group alongside Colo-Colo, Estudiantes de La Plata and Melgar. Mina scored in the group stage on 15 April 2015, heading in the third goal in a commanding 3–0 away victory over Colo-Colo at the Estadio Monumental David Arellano in Santiago on 68 minutes, with Luis Páez and Omar Pérez also scoring. Santa Fe reached the quarter-finals, where they faced Internacional of Brazil. After winning the first leg 1–0 at El Campín through a Dairon Mosquera goal, they were eliminated in the return leg in Porto Alegre on 27 May 2015, losing 2–0 — Mina scoring an own goal in the 87th minute — to go out 2–1 on aggregate.

Santa Fe then entered the 2015 Copa Sudamericana, qualifying via the Superliga title. Their route to the final took them past Nacional de Uruguay (2–0 away, 0–1 at home), Emelec of Ecuador (advancing on the away goals rule after a 2–1 defeat away and 1–0 home win), Independiente of Argentina in the quarter-finals, and Sportivo Luqueño of Paraguay in the semi-finals — progressing twice more on away goals. In the final against Huracán of Argentina, both legs ended 0–0 — the return at El Campín going to extra time, during which Mina was fouled to earn Huracán striker Ramón Ábila the only red card of the match — before Santa Fe won 3–1 on penalties through Omar Pérez, Leyvin Balanta and Luis Manuel Seijas, becoming the first Colombian club ever to win the Copa Sudamericana. Across his three seasons at Santa Fe (2014–2016), Mina made 67 appearances and scored 7 goals.

=== Palmeiras ===
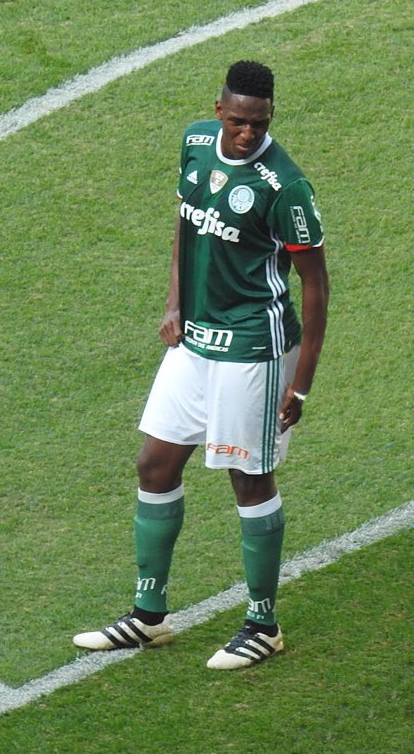
Mina during a match with Palmeiras in 2016

On 1 May 2016, Mina was confirmed as the new signing of Palmeiras. He signed a five-year contract with the club eleven days later.

==== 2016: Série A title ====
Mina made his debut for the club on 4 July 2016, playing the full 90 minutes in a 3–1 away victory over Sport Recife in the Campeonato Brasileiro. His first goal for the Verdão arrived eight days later on matchday 14, heading in to make it 1–0 in a 1–1 home draw against Santos at the Allianz Parque on 12 July 2016, before being substituted off injured just before half-time. On 13 July 2016, it was confirmed that the injury would rule him out for six to eight weeks and cost him a place at the 2016 Summer Olympics.

By late August 2016, Mina had fully recovered and returned as an undisputed starter in the backline. He scored his second goal of the season on matchday 23, heading in the equaliser in the second half during a 2–1 home victory over São Paulo at Allianz Parque on 7 September 2016, with Palmeiras coming from behind to win. Eight days later, on matchday 26, Mina scored with a chest finish in the 76th minute — his third goal in three consecutive clássicos — to seal a 2–0 victory for leaders Palmeiras over local rivals Corinthians at the Arena Corinthians on 17 September 2016, the first time a visiting side had beaten Corinthians at the stadium in 34 matches. He added a fourth league goal on matchday 27 against Coritiba as Palmeiras went on to clinch the Campeonato Brasileiro title in December 2016 — the club's first national championship in 22 years — finishing the campaign with 13 league appearances and 4 goals.

==== 2017: Copa Libertadores ====
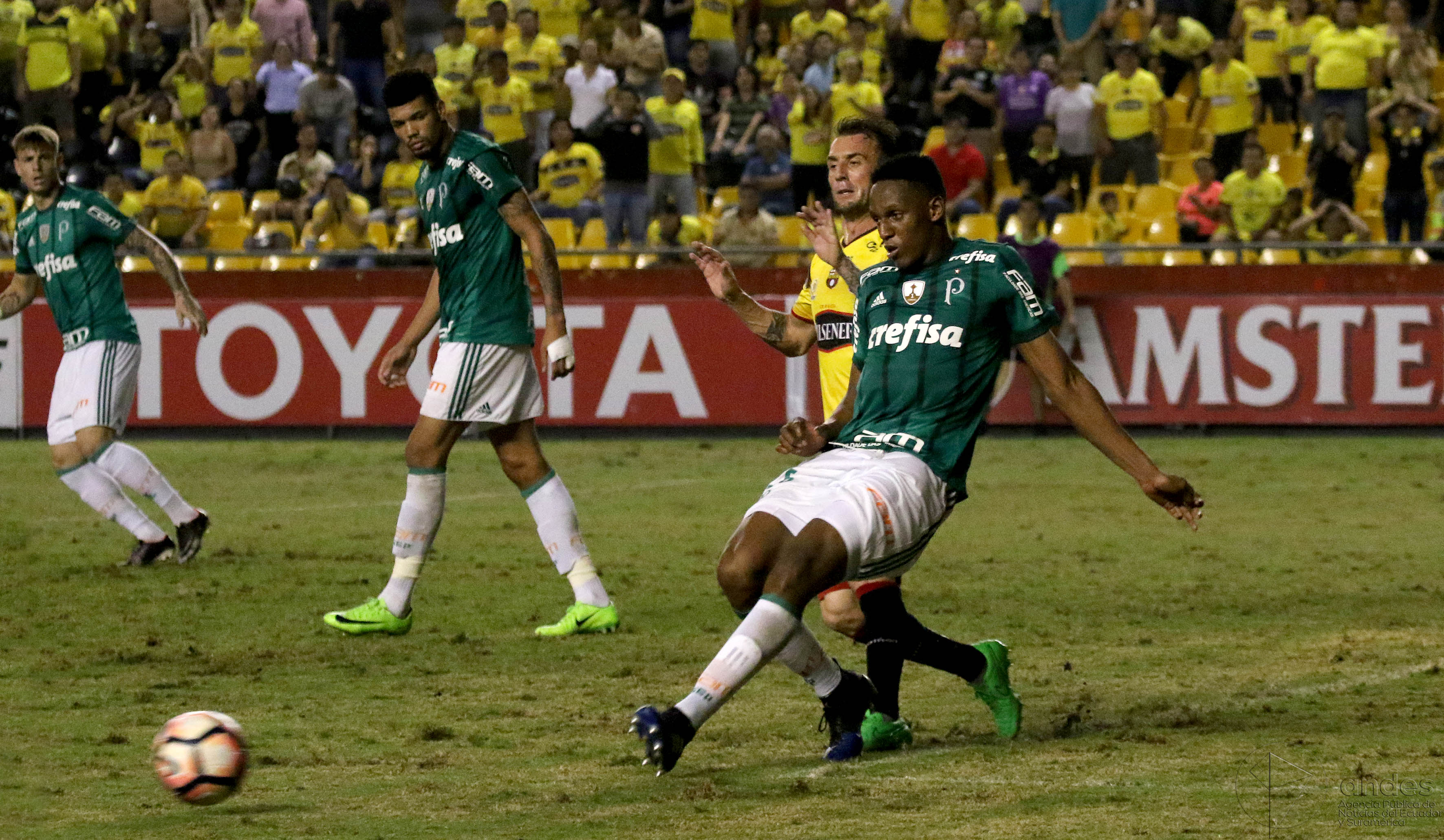
Mina in action during a 2017 Copa Libertadores Round of 16 fixture against Barcelona S.C.

In the 2017 Copa Libertadores, Mina featured across Palmeiras's group stage campaign. On 24 May 2017, he opened the scoring in the 15th minute in a 3–1 home victory over Atlético Tucumán at the Allianz Parque, heading in to give Palmeiras top spot in the group — a result confirmed the following day by Xinhua as the Verdão secured their fourth win in six group matches. Palmeiras also defeated Peñarol 3–2 in the group stage, with goals from Willian, Dudu and Fabiano, though Mina did not score in that fixture.

In the round of 16, Palmeiras faced Barcelona S.C. of Ecuador in a two-legged tie. The first leg on 5 July 2017 in Guayaquil ended 1–0 to Barcelona, with Mina playing the full 90 minutes at centre-back. In the return leg at Allianz Parque on 9 August 2017, Palmeiras won 1–0 through a 51st-minute Moisés goal to level the tie at 1–1 on aggregate; Barcelona advanced on penalty shootout 5–4, with Mina again starting at centre-back.

=== Barcelona ===
On 11 January 2018, FC Barcelona and Palmeiras reached an agreement for the transfer of Mina on a deal running for the remainder of the 2017–18 season and five more seasons, until 30 June 2023, making him the first Colombian player in the club's history. The transfer fee was reported as €11.8 million with a release clause set at €100 million, with Barcelona describing him as a powerful, aerially dominant centre-back signed to provide depth behind Gerard Piqué and Samuel Umtiti.

Mina made his debut on 8 February 2018 in the second leg of the Copa del Rey semi-final away to Valencia at the Mestalla Stadium, replacing Gerard Piqué in the 83rd minute of a 2–0 win that sent Barcelona to the final. Three days later, on 11 February, he made his home and league debut at Camp Nou in a 0–0 La Liga draw against Getafe, starting alongside Lucas Digne in central defence and playing the full 90 minutes, with ESPN noting that he was "solid and strong in the tackle" and came close to scoring twice with headers.

Mina's first direct attacking contribution for Barcelona came on 9 May 2018 in a 5–1 home win over Villarreal at Camp Nou, when he was credited with an assist for Ousmane Dembélé's second goal in stoppage time: after entering the pitch in the 80th minute, he took part in a counter-attack where a deflection off his body left Dembélé through on goal to score Barcelona's fifth. This "fortuitous assist" had become one of the most replayed moments from his short spell with the club, particularly after Dembélé's subsequent rise to global prominence.

In total, Mina made six competitive appearances for Barcelona in the second half of the 2017–18 season — three in La Liga and three in the Copa del Rey — as the team completed a domestic double by winning both competitions under manager Ernesto Valverde. Despite his limited playing time, club media emphasised his professionalism and adaptation during his first month at the club, producing a dedicated video piece titled "Yerry Mina's first 30 days at FC Barcelona" which documented his integration into training sessions and the dressing room. He left the club in August 2018 to join Everton after just half a season in Spain, becoming one of several players moved on as Barcelona reshaped their defence ahead of the 2018–19 campaign.

=== Everton ===
On 8 August 2018, Mina signed with Premier League club Everton from Barcelona in a deal worth €30 million, joining the club while recovering from a foot injury that had been sustained during the previous season.

==== 2018–19: debut and first goal ====
Mina's first appearance for the club came on 3 November 2018 when he entered as a last-minute substitute for Gylfi Sigurdsson in a 3–1 home victory over Brighton & Hove Albion at Goodison Park, with Richarlison scoring twice. The following week, on 11 November 2018, he made his full debut at Stamford Bridge against Chelsea, replacing Kurt Zouma in the starting line-up and playing 90 minutes in a 0–0 draw — a performance that earned him the man-of-the-match award from Sky Sports, with manager Marco Silva praising him as having "done everything I expected."

He scored his first goal for Everton on 26 December 2018, heading in a Bernard corner after just one minute and 39 seconds in a 5–1 away win at Burnley at Turf Moor, becoming man of the match and winning more duels than any other player on the pitch (24). The goal was notable as Everton's 7,000th in the top flight, making them the first English club to reach the milestone. He made 13 appearances in all competitions across the season — limited by a recurrence of the foot injury and a hamstring problem — as Everton finished eighth.

==== 2019–20: breakthrough season ====
Mina's second season saw him make 29 appearances in all competitions — his most in a single Everton campaign — despite further muscular problems in his knee and thigh. He scored his first brace for the club on 1 February 2020 at Vicarage Road against Watford, netting both goals in first-half stoppage time to begin a comeback from 0–2 down, with Everton ultimately winning 3–2 after Theo Walcott added a late winner.

==== 2020–21: European challenge with Ancelotti ====
With Carlo Ancelotti appointed as manager and fellow Colombian James Rodríguez arriving, Everton challenged for European qualification — briefly holding a top-six position — before finishing tenth. Mina played 29 matches across all competitions, contributing with a headed goal in a 4–2 home win over Brighton on 3 October 2020, before injury to his calf and groin ruled him out for a total of eight matches across the campaign.

==== 2021–22 and 2022–23: injury and relegation battles ====
Mina's final two seasons at Goodison Park were marked by increasingly severe injury problems and Everton's struggle against relegation. A thigh muscle tear in the 2021–22 season restricted him to 13 appearances — his lowest tally since his debut year — and required several months of rehabilitation under manager Frank Lampard, who confirmed the diagnosis publicly. He was, however, present for the decisive 3–2 home win over Crystal Palace that secured the club's Premier League status with a game to spare.

In 2022–23, an ankle injury cost him approximately 14 matches and he made only eight appearances across the campaign — his fewest in an Everton season. He returned from the bench in the final weeks of the season, under manager Sean Dyche, and scored a late goal at Wolverhampton on matchday 37 in a 1–0 win that proved critical in maintaining Everton's lead over the clubs beneath them in the relegation zone. In May 2023, he announced via social media that Everton's final league fixture — a 1–0 home win over Bournemouth on matchday 38, in which he started at centre-back — would be his last match for the club, as his contract was expiring. Across his five seasons at the club, he made 86 league appearances, scoring 7 Premier League goals, and played a central role in avoiding relegation twice.

=== Fiorentina ===
On 5 August 2023, Mina joined Fiorentina on a free transfer after the expiry of his Everton contract, signing a one-year deal with an option for an additional season.

Mina made his Serie A debut for Fiorentina on 5 November 2023, coming on as a late substitute against Juventus. He went on to make four league appearances for the club, all as a substitute, totalling 44 minutes in Serie A, as Fiorentina finished eighth in the 2023–24 campaign.

In European competition, Mina started one match in the UEFA Europa Conference League for Fiorentina, playing the full 90 minutes in a group-stage fixture and contributing to a clean sheet, before the club advanced to the knockout rounds. Across all competitions for Fiorentina, he made seven appearances without scoring, before mutually agreeing to terminate his contract and joining Cagliari on a free transfer on 1 February 2024.

=== Cagliari ===
On 1 February 2024, Mina signed for Cagliari on a permanent deal, agreeing a contract until 30 June 2024 with the club holding an option to extend it for the 2024–25 season. He made his debut for the Rossoblù on 5 February 2024 away to Roma, starting at centre-back in a Serie A fixture that marked his return to Italian football.

Mina scored his first goal for Cagliari on 19 April 2024 in a 2–2 home draw against Juventus at the Unipol Domus, heading in to give Cagliari a 2–0 lead before the visitors came back to level the match. Weeks later he found the net again in a 1–1 draw against Lecce, and in the following season he scored the opening goal in a 3–0 home win over Venezia — a result that mathematically guaranteed Cagliari's Serie A survival. Over his first two campaigns with the Sardinian club, he made more than 40 Serie A appearances and scored multiple league goals, consolidating himself as one of Cagliari's key defensive leaders.

His combative style and psychological duels with opposing forwards continued to attract attention in Italy. During a Serie A fixture against Pisa in the 2025–26 season, Mina provoked striker Rafiu Durosinmi into a reaction that resulted in the latter's dismissal, with Goal highlighting the incident as another example of the Colombian's controversial but effective approach to defending. On 23 May 2025, Cagliari announced that Mina had signed a long-term extension keeping him at the club until 30 June 2028, with an additional option year, reflecting his importance to their defensive project.

== International career ==
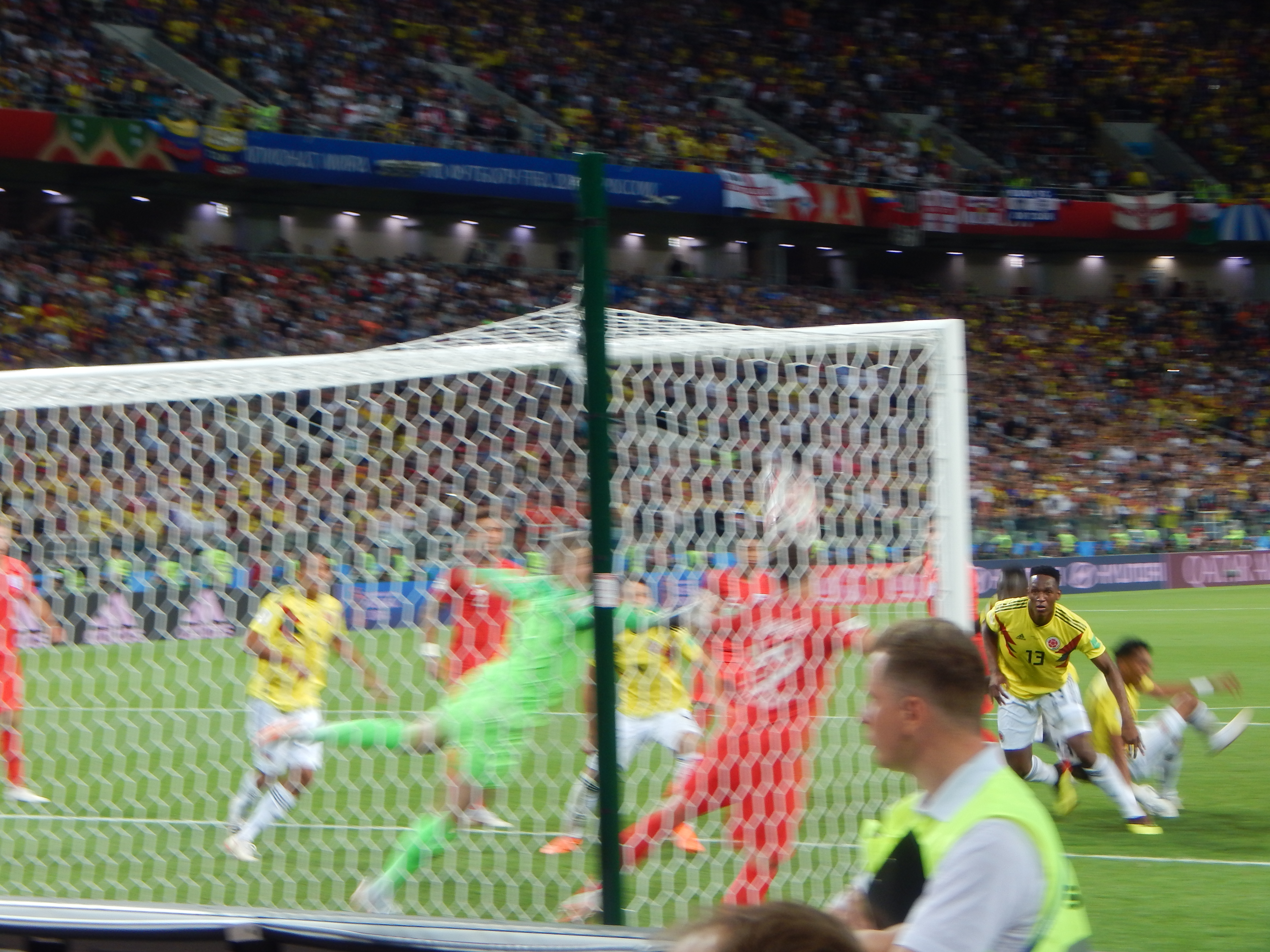
Mina ties the match against England in the Round of 16 at the 2018 FIFA World Cup

In 2016, Mina was named to Colombia's Copa América Centenario squad, starting one game against Costa Rica. He played in five of Colombia's 2018 World Cup Qualifying matches from October 2016 to March 2017, and in May 2018 he was named to Colombia's final 23-man squad for the 2018 World Cup in Russia.

At the 2018 World Cup, Mina scored three goals for Colombia, all of which were headers. Mina did not play in Colombia's opening 2–1 loss against Japan, but started at centre back in each of Colombia's remaining matches. In the group stage, he scored the opening goal in a 3–0 win over Poland, then scored the lone goal in a 1–0 win over Senegal which propelled Colombia to the top of their group and into the knockout stage. Against England in the round of sixteen, Mina tied the scoring 1–1 in the 93rd minute to send the game into extra time. Colombia went on to lose the game on penalty kicks, ending their tournament. With his three goals, he tied the record number of goals scored by a defender in a single World Cup tournament, sharing the record with Germans Paul Breitner in 1974 and Andreas Brehme in 1990.

Following the 2018 World Cup, Mina remained a central figure in Colombia's plans and received call-ups to every major tournament for which he was eligible. He was included in the 23-man squad for the 2019 Copa América in Brazil, where he started all three group-stage matches under coach Carlos Queiroz as Colombia topped a group containing Argentina, Paraguay and Qatar, conceding only one goal across those games before being eliminated on penalties by Chile in the quarter-finals. Two years later, he was once again called up for the 2021 Copa América (relocated to Brazil), forming part of Reinaldo Rueda's starting backline in a campaign that saw Colombia finish third; Mina played the full 90 minutes in most matches, scored in the quarter-final penalty shootout win over Uruguay, and took a penalty in the semi-final shootout against Argentina, which was saved by Emiliano Martínez in a moment that became infamous for Lionel Messi’s taunt of "Dance now" directed at him.

Mina was also a consistent presence in Colombia's subsequent World Cup qualifying cycles and continental tournaments. He was called up throughout the 2022 World Cup qualifiers, starting in high-profile fixtures against Chile, Ecuador and Peru, though recurring muscle injuries at club level forced him to miss several windows as Colombia ultimately failed to reach the finals in Qatar. Under Néstor Lorenzo, he was again selected for the 2024 Copa América in the United States and the opening rounds of 2026 World Cup qualifying, featuring in at least one group match at Copa América before a minor muscle injury curtailed his minutes, while still being retained in the squad for leadership and experience in a largely rejuvenated defensive unit.

Mina was subsequently selected for Colombia's squad at the 2026 FIFA World Cup, returning to the tournament eight years after his breakthrough in Russia.

== Personal life ==
Mina's father and uncle were both professional football goalkeepers. His father advised him to play another position, and his uncle took him to Deportivo Pasto's trial. His brother, Juan José, is also a footballer.

His uncle, Jair Mina, is also his agent.

Mina is a devout Christian and is a member of the neo-Pentecostal Church of God Ministry of Jesus Christ International. Mina has spoken publicly at many events sponsored by the church to talk about his life and faith.

== Career statistics ==
=== Club ===
As of match played 24 May 2026

Appearances and goals by club, season and competition
Club	Season	League			National cup (Note: Includes Copa Colombia, Copa do Brasil, Copa del Rey, FA Cup, Coppa Italia)		League cup (Note: Includes EFL Cup)		Continental		Other		Total	
Club	Season	Division	Apps	Goals	Apps	Goals	Apps	Goals	Apps	Goals	Apps	Goals	Apps	Goals
Deportivo Pasto	2013	Categoría Primera A	14	1	8	0	—		2 (Note: Appearances in Copa Sudamericana)	0	—		24	1
Santa Fe	2014	Categoría Primera A	34	3	16	0	—		2 (Note: Appearances in Copa Libertadores)	0	—		52	3
Santa Fe	2015	Categoría Primera A	23	2	8	0	—		21 (Note: Ten appearances and one goal in Copa Libertadores, eleven appearances in Copa Sudamericana)	1	2 (Note: Appearances in Superliga Colombiana)	1	54	4
Santa Fe	2016	Categoría Primera A	10	2	—		—		8	3	—		18	5
Santa Fe	Total		67	7	24	0	—		31	4	2	1	124	12
Palmeiras	2016	Série A	13	4	2	0	—		—		—		15	4
Palmeiras	2017	Série A	15	2	4	0	—		7	3	8 (Note: Appearances in Campeonato Paulista)	0	34	5
Palmeiras	Total		28	6	6	0	—		7	3	8	0	49	9
Barcelona	2017–18	La Liga	5	0	1	0	—		0	0	—		6	0
Everton	2018–19	Premier League	13	1	2	0	0	0	—		—		15	1
Everton	2019–20	Premier League	29	2	1	0	3	0	—		—		33	2
Everton	2020–21	Premier League	24	2	4	1	1	0	—		—		29	3
Everton	2021–22	Premier League	13	0	1	1	0	0	—		—		14	1
Everton	2022–23	Premier League	7	2	0	0	1	0	—		—		8	2
Everton	Total		86	7	8	2	5	0	—		—		99	9
Fiorentina	2023–24	Serie A	4	0	2	0	—		1 (Note: Appearance in UEFA Europa Conference League)	0	0	0	7	0
Cagliari	2023–24	Serie A	14	2	—		—		—		—		14	2
Cagliari	2024–25	Serie A	31	1	0	0	—		—		—		31	1
Cagliari	2025–26	Serie A	26	2	1	0	—		—		—		27	2
Cagliari	Total		71	5	1	0	—		—		—		72	5
Career total			275	26	50	2	5	0	41	7	10	1	380	36

=== International ===
As of match played 7 July 2026

Appearances and goals by national team and year
National team	Year	Apps	Goals
Colombia	2016	5	1
Colombia	2017	4	2
Colombia	2018	6	3
Colombia	2019	9	0
Colombia	2020	2	0
Colombia	2021	12	1
Colombia	2022	1	0
Colombia	2023	4	0
Colombia	2024	5	0
Colombia	2025	4	1
Colombia	2026	3	0
Total		55	8

Scores and results list Colombia's goal tally first, score column indicates score after each Mina goal.

List of international goals scored by Yerry Mina
No.	Date	Venue	Opponent	Score	Result	Competition
1	11 October 2016	Estadio Metropolitano, Barranquilla, Colombia	Uruguay	2–2	2–2	2018 FIFA World Cup qualification
2	13 June 2017	Coliseum Alfonso Pérez, Getafe, Spain	Cameroon	2–0	4–0	Friendly
3	13 June 2017	Coliseum Alfonso Pérez, Getafe, Spain	Cameroon	3–0	4–0	Friendly
4	24 June 2018	Kazan Arena, Kazan, Russia	Poland	1–0	3–0	2018 FIFA World Cup
5	28 June 2018	Cosmos Arena, Samara, Russia	Senegal	1–0	1–0	2018 FIFA World Cup
6	3 July 2018	Otkritie Arena, Moscow, Russia	England	1–1	1–1 (a.e.t.)	2018 FIFA World Cup
7	3 June 2021	Estadio Nacional, Lima, Peru	Peru	1–0	3–0	2022 FIFA World Cup qualification
8	9 September 2025	Estadio Monumental, Maturín, Venezuela	Venezuela	1–1	6–3	2026 FIFA World Cup qualification

== Honours ==
Independiente Santa Fe

- Categoría Primera A: 2014
- Copa Sudamericana: 2015
- Superliga Colombiana: 2015

Palmeiras

- Campeonato Brasileiro Série A: 2016

Barcelona

- La Liga: 2017–18
- Copa del Rey: 2017–18

Individual

- Copa Sudamericana Young Player of the Year: 2015
- Superliga Colombiana Team of the Year: 2015
- Copa Sudamericana Team of the Year: 2015
- Best Centre back in Brazil: 2016
- Campeonato Brasileiro Série A Team of the Year: 2016
- South American Team of the Year: 2016
- Campeonato Paulista Team of the Year: 2017
- FIFA World Cup Fantasy Team: 2018
