= Sebastián Salazar =

Colombian footballer (born 1995)

Personal information
- Full name: Sebastián Enrique Salazar Beltrán
- Date of birth: 30 September 1995 (age 31)
- Place of birth: Bogotá, Colombia
- Height: 1.80 m (5 ft 11 in)
- Position: Defensive midfielder

Team information
- Current team: Boyacá Chicó
- Number: 8

Youth career
- Santa Fe

Senior career*
Years	Team	Apps	(Gls)
2014–2019	Santa Fe	116	(3)
2020	Goiás	1	(0)
2021	Jaguares de Córdoba	17	(1)
2023–2024	Bogotá	52	(2)
2025–	Boyacá Chicó	11	(0)
- * Club domestic league appearances and goals as of 12 December 2025

Sebastián Enrique Salazar Beltrán (born 30 September 1995) is a Colombian professional footballer who plays as a defensive midfielder for Boyacá Chicó.

== Club career ==
=== Independiente Santa Fe ===
Coming from the reserves, Salazar made his debut with the club in 2014, under the command of Argentine coach Gustavo Costas. In the same year he was called to Colombia's U20 squad.

== Career statistics ==
=== Club ===
As of 29 September 2019

Club	Division	League			Cup		Continental		Total	
Club	Division	Season	Apps	Goals	Apps	Goals	Apps	Goals	Apps	Goals
Santa Fe	Categoría Primera A	2014	2	0	5	0	0	0	7	0
Santa Fe	Categoría Primera A	2015	18	0	6	0	12	0	36	0
Santa Fe	Categoría Primera A	2016	25	0	0	0	3	1	28	1
Santa Fe	Categoría Primera A	2017	31	1	3	0	8	0	42	1
Santa Fe	Categoría Primera A	2018	24	1	2	0	9	0	35	1
Santa Fe	Categoría Primera A	2019	15	1	1	0	-		16	1
Career total			115	3	17	0	32	1	164	4

== Honours ==
=== Club ===
Santa Fe

- Copa Sudamericana : 2015
- Categoría Primera A : 2014-II
- Superliga Colombiana : 2015, 2017
