= Sergio Otálvaro =

Colombian footballer (born 1986)

Personal information
- Full name: Sergio Andrés Otálvaro Botero
- Date of birth: 12 October 1986 (age 40)
- Place of birth: Medellín, Colombia
- Height: 1.82 m (5 ft 11 1/2 in)
- Position: Right-back

Team information
- Current team: Sportivo Luqueño
- Number: 20

Senior career*
| Years | Team | Apps | (Gls) |
| 2005–2007 | Deportivo Rionegro | | |
| 2008–2013 | Santa Fe | 140 | (5) |
| 2011 | → Junior (loan) | 22 | (0) |
| 2013–2014 | Deportes Tolima | 34 | (3) |
| 2014–2016 | Santa Fe | 65 | (3) |
| 2016–2018 | Nacional | 21 | (0) |
| 2017–2018 | → Olimpia (loan) | 36 | (0) |
| 2018–2023 | Olimpia | 138 | (2) |
| 2024– | Sportivo Luqueño | 10 | (0) |

International career
| 2010 | Colombia | 1 | (0) |
- * Club domestic league appearances and goals as of 15 September 2024

Sergio Andrés Otálvaro Botero (born 12 October 1986) is a Colombian professional footballer who plays as a right-back for Paraguayan Primera División club Sportivo Luqueño.

== Honours ==
Santa Fe

- Categoría Primera A (2): 2012 Apertura, 2014 Finalización
- Copa Colombia (1): 2009
- Copa Sudamericana (1): 2015
- Superliga Colombiana (1): 2015

Junior

- Categoría Primera A (1): 2011 Finalización
