= Francisco Meza =

Colombian footballer (born 1991)

Personal information
- Full name: Francisco Javier Meza Palma
- Date of birth: August 29, 1991 (age 35)
- Place of birth: Barranquilla, Colombia
- Height: 1.84 m (6 ft 0 in)
- Position: Center back

Team information
- Current team: Llaneros
- Number: 21

Senior career*
Years	Team	Apps	(Gls)
2011–2015	Santa Fe	159	(7)
2015–2021	UANL	74	(3)
2015	→ Santa Fe (loan)	13	(1)
2016	→ UNAM (loan)	1	(0)
2022	Santa Fe	13	(0)
2022–2023	Atlético Bucaramanga	27	(1)
2024–2025	Deportivo Cali	32	(1)
2025–	Llaneros	19	(2)
- * Club domestic league appearances and goals as of 12 December 2025

Francisco Javier Meza Palma (born August 29, 1991) is a Colombian football player who plays for Llaneros as a center back.

== Club career ==
=== Santa Fe ===
After several years in the youth teams of Independiente de Santa Fe, Meza debuted with the first team at the age of 19 under coach Arturo Boyacá on April 16, 2011. In his first year as a professional, he played over 30 games. That year in the Copa Sudamericana, Santa Fe reached the quarterfinals. In 2012, Meza continued as a starter in the defense, making his first professional goal on February 26, 2012, in a Colombian league match against Deportes Quindío. Santa Fe eventually won the Apertura Tournament, where under the command of Wilson Gutiérrez, ended the drought of 36 years without league titles.

In 2013, he started in the Superliga final against Millionarios, where Santa Fe would be crowned champions, with Meza as one of the most impressive players. In that same year, he played his first Copa Libertadores and his second international tournament - after the Copa Sudamericana 2011-; in this tournament the club reached semifinals. In addition, Santa Fe reached the final of the Colombian League.

In 2014, he scored a goal for Santa Fe to win the first leg against Independiente Medellín; what helped the team to become champions. In 2015, Meza won his second Superliga title, by defeating Atlético Nacional. In that same year, under the command of Gustavo Costas, Santa Fe reached the quarterfinals of the Copa Libertadores. On May 12, 2015, he converted his first goal in Copa Libertadores against Real Garcilaso. On December 9, 2015, Meza won his first international title with Santa Fe after being crowned 2015 Copa Sudamericana champions.

=== Tigres UANL ===
On 11 June 2015, it was official that Meza would have signed with Liga MX team Tigres UANL, but he would be joining the team until January 2016. In the meantime, he would continue playing for Independiente Santa Fe for the next 6 months.

Tigres finished the regular season of the Apertura 2017 as second place with 32 points. In play-offs, Tigres tied 1–1 in both legs against Club León and by an aggregate of 2-2, secured semifinals due table position. In semifinals, Tigres defeated Club América by 1–0 in the away game and 3–0 in home. Tigres played the historical final against archrival CF Monterrey. In the first leg the teams tied by 1–1 at the Estadio Universitario (UANL). In the Estadio BBVA Bancomer, Tigres beat Monterrey by 2–1. Meza and Eduardo Vargas scored the goals.

=== Pumas UNAM ===
On 3 December 2015, Pumas UNAM agreed to sign Meza in a season-long loan deal from Tigres UANL.

== International career ==
Meza was named in Colombia's squad for a 2018 FIFA World Cup qualifier against Argentina in November 2015.

== Honours ==
Santa Fe

- Copa Sudamericana : 2015
- Categoría Primera A : 2012-I, 2014-II
- Superliga Colombiana : 2013, 2015

UANL

- Liga MX: Apertura 2016, Apertura 2017, Clausura 2019
- CONCACAF Champions League: 2020
