= Yulián Anchico =

Colombian footballer (born 1984)

Personal information
- Full name: José Yulián Anchico Patiño
- Date of birth: 28 May 1984 (age 42)
- Place of birth: Cúcuta, Colombia
- Height: 1.82 m (6 ft 0 in)
- Positions: Right back; midfielder

Team information
- Current team: Jaguares de Córdoba
- Number: 6

Senior career*
Years	Team	Apps	(Gls)
2003–2007	Deportes Tolima	168	(21)
2008–2016	Santa Fe	240	(18)
2011	→ Pachuca (loan)	15	(3)
2017–2018	Atlético Bucaramanga	31	(0)
2018	Independiente Medellín	34	(1)
2019–2021	Jaguares de Córdoba	60	(3)
2022	Santa Fe	11	(0)

International career
2003	Colombia U20		
2005–2011	Colombia	30	(1)
- * Club domestic league appearances and goals as of 18 August 2023

José Yulián Anchico Patiño (born 28 May 1984) is a Colombian professional footballer who played as central midfielder and right-back. He has played for the Colombian U-20 national team, as well as the Colombia national football team.

== Honours ==
=== Club ===
Tolima

- Categoría Primera A: 2003-II

Santa Fe

- Copa Sudamericana: 2015
- Categoría Primera A: 2012-I,2014-II
- Copa Colombia: 2009
- Superliga Colombiana : 2013, 2015
