= Darío Rodríguez (Colombian footballer) =

Colombian footballer (born 1995)

Dario Rodriguez
Personal information
- Full name: Dario Andrés Rodriguez Parra
- Date of birth: 15 May 1995 (age 31)
- Place of birth: Bogotà, Colombia
- Height: 1.72 m (5 ft 7 1/2 in)
- Position: Forward

Team information
- Current team: Llaneros
- Number: 7

Youth career
- Santa Fe

Senior career*
Years	Team	Apps	(Gls)
2013–2015	Santa Fe	50	(2)
2016	Fortaleza	19	(4)
2016–2017	Atlético Bucaramanga	29	(10)
2018	Deportivo Pasto	31	(5)
2019	Once Caldas	21	(4)
2020	Correcaminos UAT	4	(1)
2021	Deportes Quindío	7	(0)
2022–	Llaneros	34	(3)
- * Club domestic league appearances and goals as of 19:24, 9 April 2023 (UTC)

Dario Andrés Rodriguez Parra (born 15 May 1995) is a Colombian professional footballer who plays as a forward for Llaneros.

== Career statistics ==
=== Club ===
As of 9 December 2015

Club	Division	League			Cup		Continental		Total	
Club	Division	Season	Apps	Goals	Apps	Goals	Apps	Goals	Apps	Goals
Santa Fe	Categoría Primera A	2013	3	0	-		-		3	0
Santa Fe	Categoría Primera A	2014	14	0	10	2	1	0	25	2
Santa Fe	Categoría Primera A	2015	33	2	6	0	4	0	43	2
Santa Fe	Total		50	2	16	2	5	0	71	4
Fortaleza	Categoría Primera A	2016	19	4	1	0	-		20	4
Atlético Bucaramanga	Categoría Primera A	2016	22	10	0	0	-		22	10
Atlético Bucaramanga	Categoría Primera A	2017	8	0	0	0	0	0	8	0
Atlético Bucaramanga	Total		30	10	0	0	0	0	30	10
Deportivo Pasto	Categoría Primera A	2018	31	5	2	1	-		33	6
Once Caldas	Categoría Primera A	2019	9	3	0	0	1	0	10	3
Career total			139	24	19	3	6	0	146	25

== Honours ==
=== Club ===
Santa Fe

- Copa Sudamericana : 2015
- Categoría Primera A : 2014-II
- Superliga Colombiana : 2013, 2015
