= Yeison Gordillo =

Colombian footballer (born 1992)

Personal information
- Full name: Yeison Stiven Gordillo Vargas
- Date of birth: 25 June 1992 (age 34)
- Place of birth: Miranda, Colombia
- Height: 1.76 m (5 ft 9 1/2 in)
- Position: Defensive midfielder

Team information
- Current team: Barracas Central
- Number: 25

Youth career
- Boyacá Chicó

Senior career*
Years	Team	Apps	(Gls)
2010–2015	Boyacá Chicó	130	(1)
2015–2018	Santa Fe	105	(2)
2019–2021	Deportes Tolima	39	(1)
2021–2022	San Lorenzo	31	(2)
2022–2023	Junior	16	(0)
2023	Unión Santa Fe	23	(1)
2023–2024	Vélez Sarsfield	8	(0)
2025–2026	Deportivo Cali	25	(0)
2026–	Barracas Central	0	(0)
- * Club domestic league appearances and goals as of 17:14, 16 February 2026 (UTC)

Yeison Stiven Gordillo Vargas (born 25 June 1992) is a Colombian professional footballer who plays as a defensive midfielder for Barracas Central.

== Club career ==
=== Boyacá Chicó ===
With Boyacá Chicó he played 169 matches becoming the seventh player with most caps in the club.

=== Independiente Santa Fe ===
In 2015, he arrived at Independiente Santa Fe. He started as a substitute but earned a spot in the starting eleven, becoming a key player in the team.

== Style of play ==
Gordillo is a hard-working player, one of his traits is breaking down opposition play by chasing them down; he is also known for his leadership in the field.

== Career statistics ==
=== Club ===
As of 7 February 2016

Club	Season	League		Cup		Continental		Other^{1}		Total	
Club	Season	Apps	Goals	Apps	Goals	Apps	Goals	Apps	Goals	Apps	Goals
Boyacá Chicó	2010	3	0	—						3	0
Boyacá Chicó	2011	18	0	8	0	—				26	0
Boyacá Chicó	2012	28	0	14	0	—				42	0
Boyacá Chicó	2013	31	0	8	0	—				39	0
Boyacá Chicó	2014	31	0	9	0	—				40	0
Boyacá Chicó	2015	19	1	—						19	1
Boyacá Chicó	Total	130	1	39	0	0	0	0	0	169	1
Santa Fe	2015	10	0	6	0	12	0	—		28	0
Santa Fe	2016	2	0	—		1	0	—		3	0
Santa Fe	Total	12	0	6	0	13	0	0	0	31	0
Total		142	1	45	0	13	0	0	0	200	1

^{1} Includes Recopa Sudamericana and Suruga Bank Championship.

== Honours ==
=== Club ===
Santa Fe

- Copa Sudamericana : 2015
