= Baldomero Perlaza =

Colombian footballer (born 1992)

Personal information
- Full name: Baldomero Perlaza Perlaza
- Date of birth: 5 June 1992 (age 34)
- Place of birth: Tuluá, Colombia
- Height: 1.87 m (6 ft 2 in)
- Position: Midfielder

Team information
- Current team: Independiente Medellín
- Number: 14

Youth career
- Cortuluá

Senior career*
Years	Team	Apps	(Gls)
2010–2011	Cortuluá	24	(2)
2011–2012	Atlético Huila	18	(0)
2013	Cortuluá	32	(2)
2014	Cúcuta Deportivo	40	(4)
2015–2019	Santa Fe	74	(5)
2019–2022	Atlético Nacional	74	(12)
2022–2023	Colón	49	(2)
2024–	Independiente Medellín	78	(8)
Medal record
Men's football
Representing Colombia
Third place	2021 Brazil
- * Club domestic league appearances and goals as of 11 December 2025

Baldomero Perlaza Perlaza (born 25 June 1992) is a Colombian professional footballer who plays as a midfielder for Categoría Primera A club Independiente Medellín.

== Career statistics ==
As of 25 June 2023

Club	Division	Season	League		Cup		Continental		Total
Club	Division	Season	Apps	Goals	Apps	Goals	Apps	Goals	Apps	Goals
Cortuluá	Categoría Primera A	2010	1	0	-		-		1	0
Cortuluá	Categoría Primera B	2011	23	2	5	0	-		28	2
Cortuluá	Total		24	2	5	0	0	0	29	2
Atlético Huila	Categoría Primera A	2011	10	0	-		-		10	0
Atlético Huila	Categoría Primera A	2012	8	0	7	0	-		15	0
Atlético Huila	Total		18	0	7	0	0	0	25	0
Cortuluá	Categoría Primera B	2013	32	2	-		-		32	2
Cúcuta Deportivo	Categoría Primera B	2014	40	4	8	0	-		48	4
Santa Fe	Categoría Primera A	2015	26	1	1	0	10	1	37	2
Santa Fe	Categoría Primera A	2016	35	2	4	0	10	0	49	2
Santa Fe	Categoría Primera A	2017	41	3	5	0	8	1	54	4
Santa Fe	Categoría Primera A	2018	32	1	4	0	18	0	54	1
Santa Fe	Categoría Primera A	2019	18	3	5	0	-		23	3
Santa Fe	Total		152	10	19	0	46	2	217	12
Atlético Nacional	Categoría Primera A	2019	21	3	2	0	-		23	3
Atlético Nacional	Categoría Primera A	2020	19	2	2	0	4	0	25	2
Atlético Nacional	Categoría Primera A	2021	27	7	5	0	10	1	42	8
Atlético Nacional	Categoría Primera A	2022	7	0	1	0	0	0	8	0
Atlético Nacional	Total		74	12	10	0	14	1	98	13
Colón	Argentine Primera División	2022	15	0	-		-		15	0
Colón	Argentine Primera División	2023	20	1	-		-		20	2
Colón	Career total		35	1	0	0	-		35	2
Total			375	31	49	0	60	3	484	34

== Honours ==
Santa Fe

- Copa Sudamericana: 2015
- Superliga Colombiana: 2015
