= Darío Rodríguez =

Darío Rodríguez may refer to:

- Darío Rodríguez (Uruguayan footballer) (born 1974), Uruguayan football centre-back
- Darío Rodríguez (Colombian footballer) (born 1995), Colombian football forward
