= 2017 Superliga Colombiana =

Independiente Medellín	Santa Fe
0	1
- on aggregate

First leg
Independiente Medellín	Santa Fe
0	0
- Date: 21 January 2017
- Venue: Estadio Atanasio Girardot, Medellín
- Referee: Luis Sánchez

Second leg
Santa Fe	Independiente Medellín
1	0
- Date: 29 January 2017
- Venue: Estadio El Campín, Bogotá
- Referee: Nicolás Gallo

The 2017 Superliga Colombiana (known as the 2017 Superliga Águila for sponsorship purposes) was the sixth edition of the Superliga Colombiana. It was contested by the champions of the 2016 Categoría Primera A season from 21 January to 29 January 2017. Santa Fe were the winners, beating Independiente Medellín 1–0 on aggregate score.

== Teams ==
Team	Qualification	Previous appearances (bold indicates winners)
Independiente Medellín	2016 Apertura champions	None
Santa Fe	2016 Finalización champions	2 (**2013**, **2015**)

== Matches ==
=== First leg ===
21 January 2017
19:00 UTC−5

Independiente Medellín	0–0	Santa Fe
	Report

Estadio Atanasio Girardot, Medellín
Referee: Luis Sánchez

=== Second leg ===
29 January 2017
16:00 UTC−5

Santa Fe	1–0	Independiente Medellín
Mosquera 81' (o.g.)	Report

Estadio El Campín, Bogotá
Referee: Nicolás Gallo
