= Leandro Castellanos =

Colombian footballer (born 1984)

Personal information
- Full name: Andrés Leandro Castellanos Serrano
- Date of birth: March 9, 1984 (age 42)
- Place of birth: Toledo, Norte de Santander, Colombia
- Height: 1.83 m (6 ft 0 in)
- Position: Goalkeeper

Team information
- Current team: Independiente Santa Fe
- Number: 22

Youth career
- Deportivo Pereira
- Pumas de Casanare

Senior career*
Years	Team	Apps	(Gls)
2006–2010	Cúcuta Deportivo	107	(0)
2011	América de Cali	15	(0)
2011–2012	Deportivo Cali	20	(0)
2012–2014	Independiente Medellín	79	(0)
2015–	Santa Fe	155	(0)

International career
2017	Colombia	1	(0)
- * Club domestic league appearances and goals as of 14:07, 29 December 2020 (UTC)

Andrés Leandro Castellanos Serrano (born March 9, 1984) is a Colombian professional footballer who plays as a goalkeeper for Categoría Primera A club Santa Fe.

He spent five seasons with Cúcuta Deportivo and was part of Cúcuta 2006 Colombian 1st division Championship and helped Cúcuta to the semifinals of the Copa Libertadores.

== Honours ==
=== Club ===
Cúcuta

- Champions Colombian Primera A: 2006

Santa Fe

- Copa Sudamericana: 2015
- Superliga Colombiana: 2013
