= Eduardo Domínguez =

Argentine footballer and manager

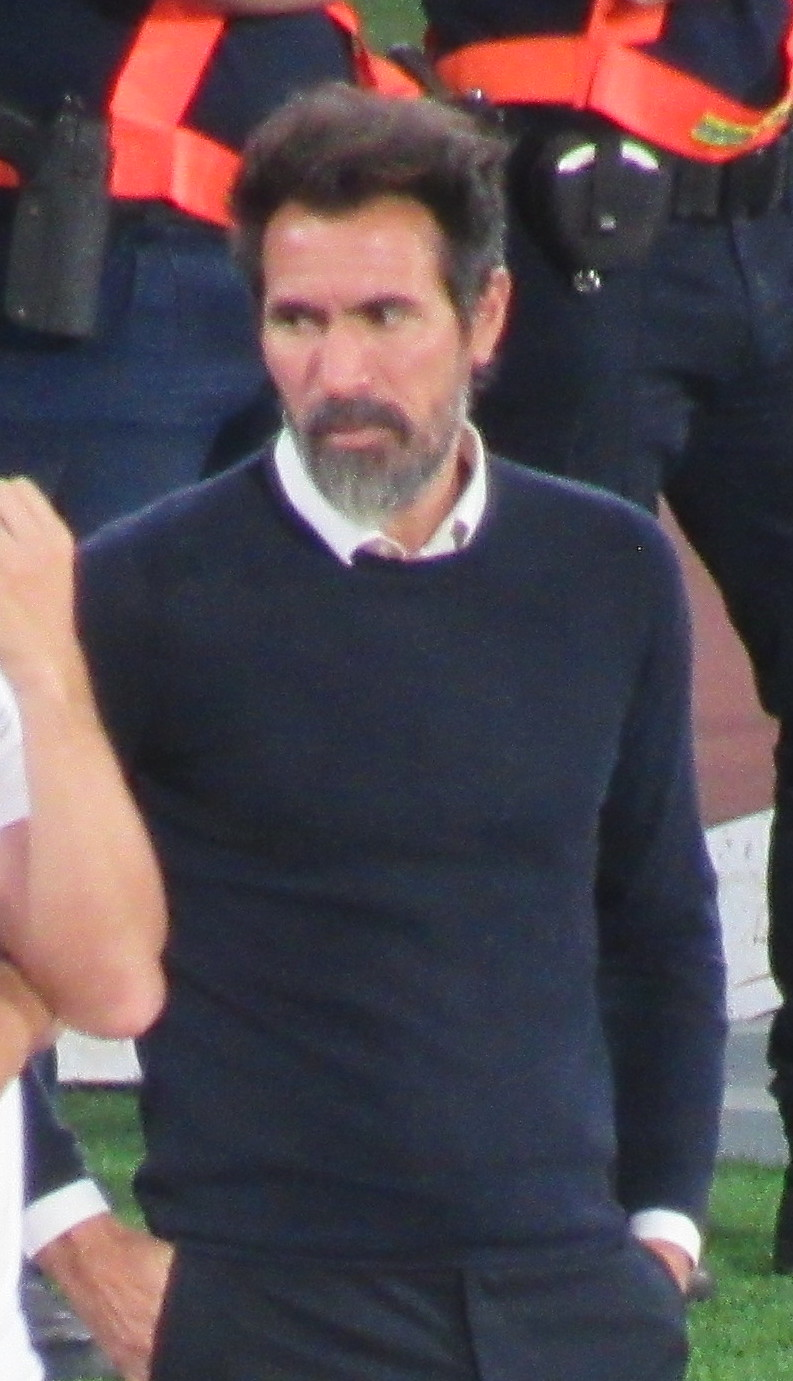
- Domínguez in 2022

Personal information
- Full name: Eduardo Rodrigo Domínguez
- Date of birth: 1 September 1978 (age 48)
- Place of birth: Lanús, Argentina
- Height: 1.85 m (6 ft 1 in)
- Position: Centre-back

Team information
- Current team: Atlético Mineiro (head coach)

Youth career
- Vélez Sársfield

Senior career*
Years	Team	Apps	(Gls)
1996–2006	Vélez Sársfield	98	(6)
2002–2003	→ Olimpo (loan)	26	(3)
2003–2004	→ Racing Club (loan)	10	(0)
2005–2006	→ Independiente (loan)	23	(2)
2006–2007	Independiente Medellín	52	(4)
2007–2008	Huracán	15	(2)
2008	LA Galaxy	3	(0)
2009–2010	Huracán	43	(4)
2010–2012	All Boys	69	(4)
2012–2015	Huracán	73	(5)
2013	→ Atlético Rafaela (loan)	15	(2)
Total		427	(32)

Managerial career
- 2015–2016: Huracán
- 2017–2018: Colón
- 2019: Nacional
- 2020–2021: Colón
- 2022: Independiente
- 2023–2026: Estudiantes
- 2026–: Atlético Mineiro
- * Club domestic league appearances and goals

Eduardo Rodrigo Domínguez (born 1 September 1978) is an Argentine football manager and former player who is the head coach of Campeonato Brasileiro Série A club Atlético Mineiro.

A former centre-back, Domínguez spent most of his career playing in his home nation, most remarkably for Vélez Sársfield and Huracán, winning the league with the former and the national cup and super cup with the latter. He also had stints in Colombia, with Independiente Medellín, and in the United States, with the LA Galaxy.

Domínguez retired as a player at Huracán in 2015 and immediately took on the role of head coach for the team. He subsequently worked at Colón, Nacional de Montevideo, Independiente, Estudiantes de La Plata and Atlético Mineiro. He led Colón to the club's first major honour, the 2021 Copa de la Liga Profesional. In charge of Estudiantes, he won five trophies, including league and cup titles.

== Playing career ==
Domínguez began his career with Vélez Sársfield in 1996. He was a member of the Vélez side that captured the 1998 Clausura under Marcelo Bielsa. He remained at Vélez until 2002, when he was loaned out to Olimpo de Bahía Blanca.

At Olimpo, Domínguez had a stellar season. He was then loaned to Racing Club, where he suffered a major injury in 2003, after just 10 games played for La Academia. Back in Vélez, he did not attend a single match for the first team in the whole 2004-05 season. After two years of recovering, he was lonaed to Racing rivals of Independiente, and quickly recovered his form.

In 2006, Domínguez joined Colombian side Independiente Medellín and was one of the club's most important players. After two seasons in Colombia, Domínguez returned to Argentina to play for Huracán during the 2008 Clausura where he established himself as an important first team player.

On 8 July 2008, Major League Soccer side Los Angeles Galaxy announced that Domínguez had joined the team. He was not expected to play for the Galaxy until 19 July, when the Galaxy face the New York Red Bulls, due to his pending work visa and for the transfer window to open up on 15 July.

In January, 2009 it was announced that Domínguez had returned to his previous team Huracán, signing a one-and-a-half-year contract. In 2010, he moved to All Boys, where he established himself as a key player.

In July 2012, Domínguez returned to Huracán for a third spell, with the club now in Primera B Nacional. The following February, he was loaned to Atlético de Rafaela in the top tier, before returning to his parent club in July.

Domínguez helped Huracán to win the 2013–14 Copa Argentina and the 2014 Supercopa Argentina, being team captain in both accolades. He retired in August 2015, aged 36.

== Managerial career ==
=== Huracán ===
Immediately after retiring, Domínguez was appointed manager of his last club Huracán, replacing Néstor Apuzzo. In his first season, he led the club to the 2015 Copa Sudamericana finals, where they lost to Independiente Santa Fe, and managed to avoid relegation.

On 30 September 2016, Domínguez resigned due to discrepancies with the club's president.

=== Colón ===
On 5 January 2017, Domínguez was presented as manager of Colón. He qualified the club to two consecutive international tournaments for the first time in their history, but resigned on 12 November 2018.

=== Nacional ===
On 27 December 2018, Domínguez moved abroad and was named manager of Nacional in the Uruguayan Primera División. On 17 March 2019, he was sacked.

=== Return to Colón ===
On 9 March 2020, Domínguez agreed to return to Colón, replacing Diego Osella. He led the side to the 2021 Copa de la Liga Profesional title, the first accolade of the club's 116-year history.

On 20 December 2021, Domínguez resigned.

=== Independiente ===
After rumours of possible appointments at Boca Juniors and Independiente, Domínguez was named at the helm of the latter on 3 January 2022. Unable to repeat the same success of his previous years, he resigned on 12 July.

=== Estudiantes ===
On 7 March 2023, Domínguez was confirmed as Abel Balbo's replacement at Estudiantes de La Plata. At the end of the year, he ended the club's 15-year spell without any titles, and lifted the 2023 Copa Argentina.

Domínguez continued to win more titles in the following seasons, lifting the 2024 Copa de la Liga Profesional, the 2025 Clausura and two conssecutive Trofeo de Campeones in 2024 and 2025. On 20 February 2026, the club announced his departure.

=== Atlético Mineiro ===
On 24 February 2026, Domínguez was appointed as head coach of Brazilian club Atlético Mineiro, agreeing to a contract running until December 2027.

== Personal life ==
Domínguez is married to fellow Argentine Brenda Bianchi, who is the daughter of former player and coach Carlos Bianchi.

== Managerial statistics ==
As of 14 November 2026

Managerial record by team and tenure
Team	Nat	From	To	Record							
Team	Nat	From	To	G	W	D	L	GF	GA	GD	Win %
Huracán	(Argentina)	18 August 2015	30 September 2016	52	18	22	12	51	37	+14	34.62
Colón	(Argentina)	1 January 2017	12 November 2018	65	26	21	18	73	57	+16	40.00
Nacional	(Uruguay)	1 January 2019	17 March 2019	8	2	4	2	8	11	−3	25.00
Colón	(Argentina)	10 March 2020	31 December 2021	56	27	13	16	76	59	+17	48.21
Independiente	(Argentina)	3 January 2022	12 July 2022	29	10	9	10	39	34	+5	34.48
Estudiantes	(Argentina)	7 March 2023	20 February 2026	164	73	49	42	217	148	+69	44.51
Atlético Mineiro	(Brazil)	26 February 2026	Present	53	23	13	17	64	55	+9	43.40
Total				427	179	131	117	528	401	+127	41.92

== Honours ==
=== Player ===
Vélez Sarsfield

- Primera División: 1998 Clausura

Huracán

- Copa Argentina: 2013–14
- Supercopa Argentina: 2014

=== Manager ===
Nacional

- Supercopa Uruguaya: 2019

Colón

- Copa de la Liga Profesional: 2021

Estudiantes

- Copa Argentina: 2023
- Copa de la Liga Profesional: 2024
- Trofeo de Campeones de la LPF: 2024, 2025
- Primera División: 2025 Clausura
