= Matías Giordano =

Argentine footballer (born 1979)

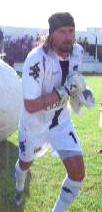
- at the exit to the field in the match of 22 November 2009 against Central Córdoba, in Santiago del Estero

Personal information
- Full name: Matías Fernando Giordano
- Date of birth: 11 September 1979 (age 47)
- Place of birth: Haedo, Argentina
- Height: 1.89 m (6 ft 2 1/2 in)
- Position: Goalkeeper

Team information
- Current team: Rosario Central (goalkeeper coach)

Senior career*
Years	Team	Apps	(Gls)
1999–2000	Chacarita Juniors	0	(0)
2000–2002	Deportivo Merlo		
2002–2003	Flandria	33	(0)
2004	Deportivo Morón	9	(0)
2005	Deportivo Merlo		
2005–2010	Comunicaciones	105	(0)
2008–2009	→ Quilmes (loan)	8	(0)
2009–2010	→ Talleres (loan)	34	(0)
2010–2011	All Boys	1	(0)
2011–2012	Sportivo Desamparados	18	(0)
2012–2013	Deportivo Merlo	34	(0)
2013–2014	Brown	41	(0)
2014–2017	Huracán	11	(0)
2017–2018	Brown	0	(0)
2018–2019	Almirante Brown	4	(0)
- * Club domestic league appearances and goals as of 14:19, 8 September 2018 (UTC)

Matías Fernando Giordano (born 11 September 1979) is a retired Argentine professional footballer who played as a goalkeeper. He is currently the goalkeeper coach of Rosario Central.

== Career ==
Giordano's footballing career began in 1999 with Chacarita Juniors in the Argentine Primera División, but he departed in 2000 after zero appearances. He subsequently joined Deportivo Merlo, before spending the 2002–03 Primera B Metropolitana season with Flandria with whom he featured thirty-three times. 2004 saw him join Deportivo Morón, prior to a return to Deportivo Merlo a year later. In 2005, Giordano was signed by Comunicaciones of Primera B Metropolitana. He went on to make one hundred and five appearances for the club. During his time with Comunicaciones, he was loaned out on two occasions.

Primera B Nacional's Quilmes loaned Giordano in 2008–09, while Torneo Argentino A's Talleres loaned him in 2009–10. A total of forty-two appearances followed with Quilmes and Talleres. Giordano left Comunicaciones in 2010 to join Argentine Primera División team All Boys. His first appearance in Argentina's top-flight came on 10 September 2010 in a tie with Colón. For the rest of the season, he was an unused substitute thirty times. Further moves to Sportivo Desamparados and Brown, either side of a third spell with Deportivo Merlo, occurred between 2011 and 2014. On 13 August 2014, Giordano joined Huracán.

He played fifteen times in all competitions over four seasons with Huracán, winning the Copa Argentina and Supercopa Argentina, before leaving ahead of the 2017–18 campaign to rejoin Brown in Primera B Nacional. However, after no appearances in a season with Brown, Giordano left in June 2018 to join Primera B Metropolitana team Almirante Brown.

== Coaching career ==
Retiring in 2019, he was hired as a goalkeeper coach for Rosario Central in October 2019.

== Career statistics ==
As of 8 September 2018.

Club statistics
Club	Season	League			Cup (Note: Includes the Copa Argentina)		League Cup		Continental		Other		Total	
Club	Season	Division	Apps	Goals	Apps	Goals	Apps	Goals	Apps	Goals	Apps	Goals	Apps	Goals
Almirante Brown	2018–19	Primera B Metropolitana	4	0	0	0	—		—		0	0	4	0
Career total			4	0	0	0	—		—		0	0	4	0

== Honours ==
Huracán

- Copa Argentina: 2013–14
- Supercopa Argentina: 2014
