= Mauro Bogado =

Argentine footballer (born 1985)

Personal information
- Full name: Mauro Ezequiel Bogado
- Date of birth: May 31, 1985 (age 41)
- Place of birth: Parque San Martín, Buenos Aires, Argentina
- Height: 1.70 m (5 ft 7 in)
- Position: Right winger

Team information
- Current team: Platense
- Number: 8

Youth career
- Argentinos Juniors

Senior career*
Years	Team	Apps	(Gls)
2006–2011	Argentinos Juniors	41	(10)
2008	→ Instituto (loan)	17	(5)
2010	→ Everton (loan)	12	(3)
2011–2015	San Martín SJ	112	(17)
2015–2020	Huracán	89	(6)
2019	→ San Martín SJ (loan)	10	(1)
2020–	Platense	33	(2)
- * Club domestic league appearances and goals as of 16:26, 10 April 2022 (UTC)

Mauro Bogado (born 31 May 1985) is an Argentine footballer who plays as a midfielder for Platense.

== Career ==
Bogado began his career in 2006 with Argentinos Juniors. In 2008, he spent some time on loan to 2nd division side Instituto before returning to Argentinos.

In 2010, Bogado was signed by Chilean side Everton de Viña del Mar on a six-month loan deal.
