= Santiago Echeverría =

Argentine footballer

Personal information
- Full name: Santiago Echeverría
- Date of birth: March 28, 1990 (age 36)
- Place of birth: Remedios de Escalada, Argentina
- Height: 1.83 m (6 ft 0 in)
- Position: Defender

Team information
- Current team: Bolívar
- Number: 5

Youth career
- 2006–2009: Talleres (RE)

Senior career*
Years	Team	Apps	(Gls)
2009–2010	Talleres (RE)	33	(0)
2011–2012	Boca Juniors	0	(0)
2012	→ Almirante Brown (loan)	33	(1)
2013–2014	Brown	36	(4)
2014–2015	Huracán	15	(0)
2015–2017	Mineros de Zacatecas	50	(0)
2017	Independiente Medellín	15	(0)
2019–2020	Brown	17	(1)
2021–2022	Wilstermann	65	(5)
2023	Guabirá	29	(0)
2024	Wilstermann	31	(3)
2025	Nacional Potosí	9	(0)
2025–	Bolívar	11	(1)
- * Club domestic league appearances and goals as of 30 December 2025

Santiago Echeverría (born March 28, 1990) is a professional Argentine footballer who plays for Bolívar. He began his career in 2008 with the Argentinian sports club Talleres.
