= Luciano Balbi =

Argentine footballer

Personal information
- Full name: Luciano Damián Balbi
- Date of birth: 4 April 1989 (age 37)
- Place of birth: Rosario, Argentina
- Height: 1.73 m (5 ft 8 in)
- Position: Left-back

Team information
- Current team: Brown de Adrogué

Youth career
- Lanús

Senior career*
Years	Team	Apps	(Gls)
2009–2015	Lanús	60	(0)
2014	→ LDU Quito (loan)	10	(0)
2015–2016	Huracán	31	(0)
2016–2017	Valladolid	40	(0)
2017–2018	Unión Santa Fe	9	(0)
2018–2019	Extremadura	2	(0)
2019	Inter Turku	11	(0)
2019	Panetolikos	5	(0)
2020–2021	Temperley	7	(0)
2021	Ferro Carril Oeste	5	(0)
2022–	Brown de Adrogué	14	(1)
- * Club domestic league appearances and goals as of 19:01, 29 June 2022 (UTC)

Luciano Damián Balbi (born 4 April 1989) is an Argentine footballer who plays as a left-back for Brown de Adrogué.

== Honours ==
Lanús

- Copa Sudamericana: 2013
