= Leyvin Balanta =

Colombian footballer (born 1990)

Personal information
- Full name: Leyvin Jhojane Balanta Fory
- Date of birth: 3 September 1990 (age 36)
- Place of birth: Bogotá, Colombia
- Height: 1.86 m (6 ft 1 in)
- Position: Left back

Team information
- Current team: Municipal Limeno

Senior career*
Years	Team	Apps	(Gls)
2009	Deportivo Pasto	1	(0)
2011–2015	América de Cali	77	(6)
2015–2018	Santa Fe	83	(4)
2019–2021	Deportes Tolima	56	(1)
2022	Once Caldas	11	(0)
2023	Always Ready	1	(0)
2023-2024	Real Estelí FC	44	(0)
2025-	Municipal Limeno	7	(0)

International career^{‡}
2017	Colombia	1	(0)
- * Club domestic league appearances and goals as of 12 February 2019 ‡ National team caps and goals as of 25 January 2017

Leyvin Jhojane Balanta Fory (born 3 September 1990) is a Colombian professional footballer who plays as a left back for Primera División de El Salvador club Municipal Limeno.

== Club career ==
=== Independiente Santa Fe ===
He was signed by Independiente Santa Fe in 2015.

== Career statistics ==
=== Club ===
As of 29 May 2016

Club	Season	League		Cup		Continental		Other^{1}		Total	
Club	Season	Apps	Goals	Apps	Goals	Apps	Goals	Apps	Goals	Apps	Goals
Deportivo Pasto	2009	1	0	—						1	0
Deportivo Pasto	Total	1	0	0	0	0	0	0	0	1	0
América de Cali	2011	4	0	2	0	—				6	0
América de Cali	2012	28	2	6	0	—				34	2
América de Cali	2013	—		1	0	—				1	0
América de Cali	2014	36	4	7	0	—				43	4
América de Cali	2015	9	0	3	0	—				12	0
América de Cali	Total	77	6	19	0	0	0	0	0	96	6
Santa Fe	2015	5	0	5	0	7	1	—		17	1
Santa Fe	2016	4	0	—		5	0	—		9	0
Santa Fe	Total	9	0	5	0	12	1	0	0	26	1
Total		87	6	24	0	12	1	0	0	123	7

^{1} Includes Recopa Sudamericana and Suruga Bank Championship.

== Honours ==
=== Club ===
Santa Fe

- Copa Sudamericana : 2015
