= Ramón Ábila =

Argentine footballer (born 1989)

Ramón "Wanchope" Ábila
Personal information
- Full name: Ramón Darío Ábila
- Date of birth: 14 October 1989 (age 37)
- Place of birth: Córdoba, Argentina
- Height: 1.82 m (6 ft 0 in)
- Position: Forward

Team information
- Current team: Estudiantes RC
- Number: 50

Youth career
- 2008: Instituto

Senior career*
Years	Team	Apps	(Gls)
2008–2014	Instituto	54	(12)
2011–2012	→ Sarmiento (loan)	34	(9)
2012–2013	→ Deportivo Morón (loan)	32	(4)
2014–2016	Huracán	76	(36)
2016–2017	Cruzeiro	31	(10)
2017	→ Huracán (loan)	9	(4)
2018–2022	Boca Juniors	48	(23)
2021	→ Minnesota United (loan)	10	(2)
2022	→ D.C. United (loan)	12	(3)
2022–2024	Colón	74	(20)
2024	Barracas Central	10	(0)
2024–2026	Huracán	30	(0)
2026–	Estudiantes RC	8	(0)
- * Club domestic league appearances and goals as of 17:26, 11 May 2026 (UTC)

Ramón Darío Ábila (born October 14, 1989) is an Argentine professional footballer who plays as a forward for Estudiantes RC. He is commonly known by the Argentine media as "Wanchope."

== Career ==
Ábila came from the youth divisions of Instituto Atlético Central Córdoba, made his professional debut in Primera B Nacional in 2008. He was loaned to Sarmiento de Junín and then Deportivo Morón, teams from Argentina soccer's third division, returning to Instituto in 2013.

Later he signed with Huracán where he was one of top scorers at Copa Sudamericana 2015 and he was part of the Huracán squad which won the 2013–14 Copa Argentina and 2014 Supercopa Argentina.

On 22 June 2016, Ábila was signed by Cruzeiro on a four-year contract for a transfer fee of US$4 million. He was loaned to Cruzeiro for the 2017 season.

=== Boca Juniors ===
He was transferred to Boca Juniors in December 2017. On 11 February 2018, he made his debut in a 1–0 win against Club Atlético Temperley. Two weeks later, he scored his first goal for the club in a 4–2 win against San Martín. On 11 November, in the 2018 Copa Libertadores Final first leg, he scored Boca's first goal in the match against River which ended 2–2.

=== Minnesota United ===
On 7 April 2021, Major League Soccer side Minnesota United acquired Ábila on loan with an option to purchase using Targeted Allocation Money.

He scored his first MLS goal on 12 May 2021 in a home match against the Vancouver Whitecaps. He lifted his jersey in celebration to reveal a shirt with a photo of his brother, Gaston, who had died by suicide the year prior.

=== D.C. United ===
On 11 August 2021, D.C. United acquired Ábila on another loan off of waivers. He scored his first goal for the club on 18 August, in a 2–3 loss against the New England Revolution. Following the 2021 season, Ábila was released by the club.

=== Colon ===
On 8 February 2022, he joined Club Atlético Colón.

== Career statistics ==
As of 17 March 2019

Club statistics
Club	Season	League			Cup		State League		Continental		Total	
Club	Season	Division	Apps	Goals	Apps	Goals	Apps	Goals	Apps	Goals	Apps	Goals
Instituto	2008–09	Primera B Nacional	4	0	0	0	—				4	0
Instituto	2009–10	Primera B Nacional	10	0	0	0	—				10	0
Instituto	2010–11	Primera B Nacional	24	5	0	0	—				24	5
Instituto	2013–14	Primera B Nacional	16	7	0	0	—				16	7
Instituto	Subtotal		54	12	0	0	0	0	0	0	54	12
Sarmiento (loan)	2011–12	Primera B Metropolitana	34	9	3	3	—				37	12
Deportivo Morón (loan)	2012–13	Primera B Metropolitana	32	4	2	0	—				34	4
Huracán	2013–14	Primera B Nacional	20	6	4	3	—				24	9
Huracán	2014	Primera B Nacional	16	10	0	0	—				16	10
Huracán	2015	Argentine Primera División	25	9	2	0	—		17	9	44	18
Huracán	2016	Argentine Primera División	15	11	0	0	—		9	5	24	16
Huracán	2017–18	Argentine Primera División	9	4	2	1	—				11	5
Huracán	Subtotal		85	40	8	4	0	0	26	14	119	58
Cruzeiro (loan)	2016	Campeonato Brasileiro Série A	21	7	7	5	—				28	12
Cruzeiro (loan)	2017	Campeonato Brasileiro Série A	10	3	5	1	15	8	2	1	32	13
Cruzeiro (loan)	Subtotal		31	10	12	6	15	8	2	1	60	25
Boca Juniors	2017–18	Argentine Primera División	11	6	1	0	—		4	2	16	8
Boca Juniors	2018–19	Argentine Primera División	14	4	2	2	—		8	3	24	9
Boca Juniors	Subtotal		25	10	3	2	0	0	12	5	40	17
Career totals			261	85	27	15	15	8	40	20	344	128

== Honours ==
Sarmiento (J)

- Primera B Metropolitana: 2011–12

Huracán

- Copa Argentina: 2013–14
- Supercopa Argentina: 2014

Cruzeiro

- Copa do Brasil: 2017

Boca Juniors

- Primera División: 2017–18, 2019–20
- Copa de la Liga Profesional: 2020
- Supercopa Argentina: 2018
