= Patricio Toranzo =

Argentine footballer

Personal information
- Full name: Patricio Daniel Toranzo
- Date of birth: 19 March 1982 (age 44)
- Place of birth: Buenos Aires, Argentina
- Height: 1.78 m (5 ft 10 in)
- Positions: Attacking midfielder; winger

Youth career
- River Plate

Senior career*
Years	Team	Apps	(Gls)
2004–2007	River Plate	3	(1)
2005–2006	→ Quilmes (loan)	12	(0)
2006–2007	→ Atlético de Rafaela (loan)	36	(2)
2007–2010	Huracán	69	(8)
2010–2012	Racing Club	58	(3)
2012	→ All Boys (loan)	12	(0)
2013	Shanghai Shenhua	25	(2)
2014–2019	Huracán	108	(10)
2019	Almagro	8	(0)
2020	Ciclón de Tarija	0	(0)
2020–2022	Huracán	20	(0)

International career
2010	Argentina	2	(0)
- * Club domestic league appearances and goals

Patricio Toranzo (born 19 March 1982 in Buenos Aires) is a retired Argentine football player, who played as an attacking midfielder or a winger.

== Career ==
=== Club career ===
Toranzo made his professional debut for Club Atlético River Plate in a league match against Racing Club de Avellaneda on 3 June 2004.

After stints with Quilmes and Atlético de Rafaela he joined Huracán in 2007.

=== International career ===
Toranzo made his debut for the Argentina national team after being called up to join Diego Maradona's squad of local league call-ups who beat Jamaica 2–1 on 10 February 2010.
