= 2014 Categoría Primera A season =

Liga Postobón
- Season: 2014
- Champions: Apertura: Atlético Nacional (14th title); Finalización: Santa Fe (8th title)
- Relegated: Fortaleza
- Copa Libertadores: Atlético Nacional; Santa Fe; Once Caldas
- Copa Sudamericana: Deportes Tolima (cup winner); Santa Fe (Superliga winner); Águilas Pereira; Junior
- Top goalscorer: Apertura: Dayro Moreno (13 goals); Finalización: Germán Cano (16 goals)

The 2014 Categoría Primera A season (officially known as the 2014 Liga Postobón season for sponsorship reasons) is the 67th season of Colombia's top-flight football league. Atlético Nacional come in as the defending champions having won both titles in the 2013 season.

== Format ==
The format for the Apertura tournament will have a variation due to the 2014 FIFA World Cup and will be similar to the format used in 2011. It will be divided into three stages. The First Stage will be contested on a home-and-away basis, with each team playing the other teams once and playing a regional rival once more. The top eight teams after eighteen rounds will advance to a knockout round, where they will be pitted into four ties to be played on a home-and-away basis, with the four winners advancing to the semifinals and the winner of each semifinal advancing to the final of the tournament, which will be played on a home-and-away basis as well. The winner of the final will be declared the tournament champion and will participate in the 2015 Copa Libertadores. The Finalización tournament will keep the format used in the 2013 season.

== Teams ==
Locations of the 2014 Primera A teams

Team	City	Stadium	2013 season
Alianza Petrolera	Floridablanca	Álvaro Gómez Hurtado	16th
Atlético Huila	Neiva	Guillermo Plazas Alcid	15th
Atlético Nacional	Medellín	Atanasio Girardot	1st
Boyacá Chicó	Tunja	La Independencia	12th
Deportes Tolima	Ibagué	Manuel Murillo Toro	4th
Deportivo Cali	Cali	Pascual Guerrero	7th
Deportivo Pasto	Pasto	Departamental Libertad	10th
Envigado	Envigado	Polideportivo Sur	11th
Fortaleza	Zipaquirá	Metropolitano de Techo	Primera B runners-up
Independiente Medellín	Medellín	Atanasio Girardot	13th
Itagüí/Águilas Pereira	Apertura: Itagüí; Finalización: Pereira	Apertura: Ciudad de Itagüí; Finalización: Hernán Ramírez Villegas	2nd
Junior	Barranquilla	Metropolitano	6th
La Equidad	Bogotá	Metropolitano de Techo	9th
Millonarios	Bogotá	Nemesio Camacho	3rd
Once Caldas	Manizales	Palogrande	8th
Patriotas	Tunja	La Independencia	14th
Santa Fe	Bogotá	Nemesio Camacho	5th
Uniautónoma	Barranquilla	Metropolitano	Primera B champions

== Torneo Apertura ==
=== First stage ===
The First Stage began on January 24 and consisted of eighteen rounds and a series of regional rivalries on the ninth round. The top eight teams out of this stage will advance to the knockout stage. The first stage ended on April 20.

==== Standings ====
Pos	Team	Pld	W	D	L	GF	GA	GD	Pts	Qualification
1	Atlético Nacional	18	10	4	4	35	22	+13	34	Advanced to the Quarterfinals
2	Millonarios	18	10	3	5	27	15	+12	33	Advanced to the Quarterfinals
3	Junior	18	10	3	5	20	17	+3	33	Advanced to the Quarterfinals
4	Santa Fe	18	8	6	4	24	16	+8	30	Advanced to the Quarterfinals
5	Once Caldas	18	7	8	3	27	17	+10	29	Advanced to the Quarterfinals
6	Envigado	18	9	1	8	27	24	+3	28	Advanced to the Quarterfinals
7	Itagüí	18	8	4	6	21	23	−2	28	Advanced to the Quarterfinals
8	La Equidad	18	7	6	5	17	17	0	27	Advanced to the Quarterfinals
9	Alianza Petrolera	18	8	3	7	23	28	−5	27	
10	Boyacá Chicó	18	7	4	7	19	16	+3	25	
11	Independiente Medellín	18	5	6	7	26	30	−4	21	
12	Deportivo Pasto	18	4	8	6	28	26	+2	20	
13	Atlético Huila	18	5	4	9	23	26	−3	19	
14	Deportivo Cali	18	5	4	9	16	22	−6	19	
15	Patriotas	18	5	4	9	20	30	−10	19	
16	Fortaleza	18	3	8	7	22	26	−4	17	
17	Uniautónoma	18	4	5	9	20	30	−10	17	
18	Deportes Tolima	18	4	5	9	18	28	−10	17	

Rules for classification: 1st points; 2nd goal difference; 3rd goals scored; 4th away goals scored; 5th away goals against; 6th draw.

==== Results ====
Home \ Away	AP	HUI	NAC	BOY	TOL	CAL	PAS	ENV	FOR	DIM	ITA	JUN	EQU	MIL	ONC	PAT	SFE	UAU
Alianza Petrolera				1–2			1–1	0–2	1–0	2–1		1–0		2–1	0–2		1–2	
Atlético Huila	3–0		2–0		2–0				3–1	1–1		2–3	0–1		2–0			1–1
Atlético Nacional	5–1				2–0		1–1		4–3	3–1		1–0	1–2				2–2	3–1
Boyacá Chicó		1–0	1–2			2–1		2–0			0–1			1–0	1–1	3–0		3–2
Deportes Tolima	1–2	1–1		1–0			1–1	2–4	1–1	1–1		3–1					0–0	
Deportivo Cali	1–2	1–0	0–3		2–0		2–2				2–3		1–0		0–1	2–1		
Deportivo Pasto		5–1		0–0		1–1		1–2			1–2			1–1	3–2	3–1		4–0
Envigado		2–0	2–3			3–1					1–0		1–3	1–2	2–1	2–2		1–0
Fortaleza				0–0		0–0	4–1	2–1				0–0	1–1	0–1		2–2	1–2	
Independiente Medellín			0–2	2–1		2–0	2–0	3–2	3–3			2–2		2–1			0–2	
Itagüí	1–2	2–1	1–1		1–0			1–0	2–1	1–1			3–1		2–2			
Junior				2–1		1–0	1–0	1–0			2–0			0–1		1–0	2–1	1–1
La Equidad	1–1			1–0	0–2		1–1		1–1	2–1		0–1					0–2	0–0
Millonarios		2–2	3–1		3–1	1–0					3–0		0–1		1–1	4–0	2–1	
Once Caldas	2–1		0–0		3–0				3–1	2–2		3–0	0–0				1–1	3–1
Patriotas	3–3	3–1	2–1	2–1	1–2					1–0	1–0		1–2		0–0			
Santa Fe		2–1		0–0		0–0	3–2	0–1			3–0			0–1		1–0		2–2
Uniautónoma	0–2				3–2	0–2			0–1	4–2	1–1	1–2		1–0		2–0		

Legend: Blue = home team win; Yellow = draw; Red = away team win.

=== Knockout round bracket ===
Quarterfinals
1	Atlético Nacional	4	2	6
6	Envigado	1	1	2
4	Santa Fe	4	1	5
5	Once Caldas	1	2	3
2	Millonarios	1	1	2
8	La Equidad	0	1	1
3	Junior	1	2	3
7	Itagüí	1	1	2

Semifinals
1	Atlético Nacional	0	2	2
4	Santa Fe	1	0	1
2	Millonarios	0	0	0 (4)
3	Junior (p)	0	0	0 (5)

Finals
1	Atlético Nacional (p)	0	2	2 (4)
3	Junior	1	1	2 (2)

=== Quarterfinals ===
Team 1	Agg.	Team 2	1st leg	2nd leg
Envigado	2–6	Atlético Nacional	1–4	1–2
La Equidad	1–2	Millonarios	0–1	1–1
Itagüí	2–3	Junior	1–1	1–2
Once Caldas	3–5	Santa Fe	1–4	2–1

=== Semifinals ===
Team 1	Agg.	Team 2	1st leg	2nd leg
Santa Fe	1–2	Atlético Nacional	1–0	0–2
Junior	0–0 (5–4 p)	Millonarios	0–0	0–0

=== Finals ===
May 18, 2014
18:30 UTC−05:00

Junior	1 – 0	Atlético Nacional
Toloza 55'	Report

Estadio Metropolitano, Barranquilla
Referee: Luis Sánchez

May 21, 2014
19:00 UTC−05:00

Atlético Nacional	2 – 1	Junior
Henríquez 2'; Valoy 90+3'	Report	Toloza 17'
Penalties
Valencia (penalty scored); Cardona (penalty scored); Bocanegra (penalty scored); Bernal (penalty scored)	4–2	(penalty scored) Domínguez; (penalty missed) Viera; (penalty scored) Narváez; (penalty missed) Vásquez

Estadio Atanasio Girardot, Medellín
Referee: Ímer Machado

=== Top goalscorers ===
Rank	Name	Club	Goals
1	(Colombia) Dayro Moreno	Millonarios	13
2	(Argentina) Germán Cano	Independiente Medellín	11
3	(Colombia) Carlos Rentería	Patriotas	10
3	(Colombia) Óscar Rodas	Envigado	10
5	(Colombia) Ayron del Valle	Alianza Petrolera	9

Source: Soccerway.com

== Torneo Finalización ==
=== First stage ===
The First Stage began on July 18 and consisted of eighteen rounds and a series of regional rivalries on the ninth round. The top eight teams out of this stage advanced to the knockout stage. The first stage ended on November 9. Starting from this tournament, Itagüí will compete under the name Águilas Doradas since the club was expelled from Itagüí in May 2014, and will move to Pereira, playing their home games at Estadio Hernán Ramírez Villegas. The club eventually changed its name to Águilas Pereira in order to reflect this move.

==== Standings ====
Pos	Team	Pld	W	D	L	GF	GA	GD	Pts	Qualification
1	Santa Fe	18	9	4	5	24	13	+11	31	Advanced to the Semifinals
2	Independiente Medellín	18	9	3	6	29	21	+8	30	Advanced to the Semifinals
3	Atlético Nacional	18	8	5	5	26	12	+14	29	Advanced to the Semifinals
4	Águilas Pereira	18	9	2	7	23	21	+2	29	Advanced to the Semifinals
5	Once Caldas	18	7	7	4	24	17	+7	28	Advanced to the Semifinals
6	Deportivo Cali	18	8	4	6	25	25	0	28	Advanced to the Semifinals
7	Deportes Tolima	18	7	7	4	23	25	−2	28	Advanced to the Semifinals
8	Atlético Huila	18	7	6	5	25	18	+7	27	Advanced to the Semifinals
9	Alianza Petrolera	18	7	6	5	17	16	+1	27	
10	Patriotas	18	7	5	6	19	24	−5	26	
11	Boyacá Chicó	18	5	7	6	23	22	+1	22	
12	Junior	18	6	4	8	19	20	−1	22	
13	Fortaleza	18	5	6	7	17	21	−4	21	
14	Envigado	18	5	5	8	18	20	−2	20	
15	Millonarios	18	5	5	8	22	28	−6	20	
16	Uniautónoma	18	4	6	8	15	23	−8	18	
17	Deportivo Pasto	18	3	9	6	15	23	−8	18	
18	La Equidad	18	3	5	10	16	31	−15	14	

Rules for classification: 1st points; 2nd goal difference; 3rd goals scored; 4th away goals scored; 5th away goals against; 6th draw.

==== Results ====
Home \ Away	AGU	AP	HUI	NAC	BOY	TOL	CAL	PAS	ENV	FOR	DIM	JUN	EQU	MIL	ONC	PAT	SFE	UAU
Águilas Pereira					3–2		0–1	2–0	1–0			0–0		4–2		2–3	2–1	2–0
Alianza Petrolera	1–0		0–0	1–1		0–1	3–1						3–1		1–0	1–1		0–0
Atlético Huila	1–3				2–0	0–0	0–1	3–0	1–1					1–0		4–1	1–0	
Atlético Nacional	2–0		0–1		2–2		2–2		0–1		1–0			5–0	0–0	2–0		
Boyacá Chicó		1–0				0–1		0–0		0–0	3–1	2–0	5–1			1–1	1–2	
Deportes Tolima	2–0		1–5	1–1			2–3						2–1	1–0	3–3	1–1		2–0
Deportivo Cali					0–1			2–0	0–0	2–0	1–1	1–0		4–3			2–0	0–4
Deportivo Pasto		0–0		2–1		2–2	2–0			1–1	0–0	3–3	0–0				1–2	
Envigado	2–0	2–3			2–2	0–0		1–2		0–2	0–1	1–0					2–2	
Fortaleza	0–2	2–1	1–1	1–0		1–1					2–3		3–0		0–1			1–1
Independiente Medellín	3–0	1–2	4–1	1–0		2–3							1–1		1–3	3–1		1–0
Junior		0–1	4–3	0–1		1–0				1–3	0–1		1–0		2–0			3–1
La Equidad	0–0		1–1	0–4			3–2		0–1	0–0				0–1	2–0	4–2		
Millonarios		2–0			1–1			1–1	2–1	4–0	1–4	0–0					0–1	0–0
Once Caldas	1–2	3–0	0–0		4–1		3–3	1–0	2–1					1–1		2–0		
Patriotas					1–0		1–0	3–0	2–1	1–0		0–0		0–3			0–0	1–0
Santa Fe		0–0		0–1		5–0				2–0	2–1	1–0	2–0	4–1	0–0			
Uniautónoma			1–0	0–3	1–1			1–1	0–2			2–4	3–2		0–0		1–0	

Legend: Blue = home team win; Yellow = draw; Red = away team win.

=== Semifinals ===
The Semifinal stage began on November 13 and ended on December 7. The eight teams that advanced were sorted into two groups of four teams. The winner of each group advanced to the finals.

==== Group A ====
Pos	Team	Pld	W	D	L	GF	GA	GD	Pts	Qualification	SFE	HUI	NAC	ONC
1	Santa Fe	6	3	2	1	8	6	+2	11	Advanced to the Finals		0–0	3–2	0–1
2	Atlético Huila	6	3	2	1	8	6	+2	11		3–3		1–0	2–1
3	Atlético Nacional	6	2	0	4	4	6	−2	6		0–1	1–0		1–0
4	Once Caldas	6	2	0	4	4	6	−2	6		0–1	1–2	1–0	

Legend: Blue = home team win; Yellow = draw; Red = away team win.
Rules for classification: 1st points; 2nd first stage position.

==== Group B ====
Pos	Team	Pld	W	D	L	GF	GA	GD	Pts	Qualification	DIM	CAL	AGU	TOL
1	Independiente Medellín	6	3	2	1	11	9	+2	11	Advanced to the Finals		3–2	2–1	1–1
2	Deportivo Cali	6	2	2	2	12	13	−1	8		2–1		2–2	2–1
3	Águilas Pereira	6	1	4	1	11	11	0	7		2–2	2–2		2–2
4	Deportes Tolima	6	1	2	3	10	11	−1	5		1–2	4–2	1–2	

Legend: Blue = home team win; Yellow = draw; Red = away team win.
Rules for classification: 1st points; 2nd first stage position.

=== Finals ===
December 17, 2014
19:30 UTC−05:00

Independiente Medellín	1 – 2	Santa Fe
Cano 37'	Report	Meza 65'; Morelo 68'

Estadio Atanasio Girardot, Medellín
Referee: Ulises Arrieta

December 21, 2014
18:00 UTC−05:00

Santa Fe	1 – 1	Independiente Medellín
Arias 46'	Report	Mosquera 89'

Estadio El Campín, Bogotá
Referee: Luis Sánchez

=== Top goalscorers ===
Rank	Name	Club	Goals
1	(Argentina) Germán Cano	Independiente Medellín	16
2	(Colombia) Juan Caicedo	Atlético Huila	14
3	(Colombia) Wilson Morelo	Santa Fe	10
3	(Colombia) Fernando Uribe	Millonarios	10
5	(Colombia) Edinson Palomino	Águilas Pereira	8

Source: Liga Postobón

== Relegation ==
A separate table is kept to determine the teams that get relegated to the Categoría Primera B for the next season. The table includes an average of all first stage games played for the current season and the previous two seasons.

Pos	Team	2012 Pts	2013 Pts	2014 Pts	Total Pts	Total Pld	Avg	Relegation
1	Atlético Nacional	52	69	63	184	108	1.704	
2	Águilas Pereira	61	58	57	176	108	1.63	
3	Santa Fe	52	61	61	174	108	1.611	
4	Millonarios	57	59	53	169	108	1.565	
5	Junior	57	52	55	164	108	1.519	
6	Deportes Tolima	65	50	45	160	108	1.481	
7	Deportivo Cali	49	58	47	154	108	1.426	
8	La Equidad	61	45	41	147	108	1.361	
9	Once Caldas	33	56	57	146	108	1.352	
10	Deportivo Pasto	52	53	38	143	108	1.324	
11	Independiente Medellín	43	47	51	141	108	1.306	
12	Alianza Petrolera	41	38	54	133	108	1.231	
13	Envigado	44	39	48	131	108	1.213	
14	Boyacá Chicó	49	34	47	130	108	1.204	
15	Atlético Huila	41	40	46	127	108	1.176	
16	Patriotas	44	34	45	123	108	1.139	
17	Uniautónoma (O)	44	34	35	113	108	1.046	Relegation/promotion playoff
18	Fortaleza (R)	35	39	38	112	108	1.037	Categoría Primera B

Rules for classification: 1st average; 2nd goal difference; 3rd number of goals scored; 4th away goals scored.

=== Promotion/relegation playoff ===
The second worst team in the relegation table, Uniautónoma played Quindío, the 2014 Categoría Primera B runner-up, for a berth in the 2015 Categoría Primera A season. As the Primera A team, Uniautónoma played the second leg at home. The winner was determined by points, followed by goal difference, then a penalty shootout. Uniautónoma defeated Quindío 2-0 on aggregate score and will remain in the top tier for the 2015 season.

Team 1	Agg.	Team 2	1st leg	2nd leg
Quindío	0–2	Uniautónoma	0–0	0–2

== Aggregate table ==
An aggregate table including all games that a team plays during the year is used to determine First Stage berths to both the Copa Libertadores and the Copa Sudamericana. The best-placed non-champion will go to the first stage of the 2015 Copa Libertadores and the 2nd and 3rd best-placed non-champions will go to the first stage of the 2015 Copa Sudamericana.

Pos	Team	Pld	W	D	L	GF	GA	GD	Pts	Qualification
1	Santa Fe (C)	48	23	13	12	65	42	+23	82	2015 Copa Libertadores Second Stage and 2015 Copa Sudamericana First Stage (Note: Santa Fe are qualified for the 2015 Copa Libertadores as the Finalización champions and for the 2015 Copa Sudamericana as the 2015 Superliga Colombiana winners.)
2	Atlético Nacional (C)	48	24	9	15	75	45	+30	81	2015 Copa Libertadores Second Stage (Note: Atlético Nacional are qualified for the 2015 Copa Libertadores as the Apertura champions.)
3	Once Caldas	44	17	15	12	58	45	+13	66	2015 Copa Libertadores First Stage
4	Águilas Pereira	44	18	11	15	57	58	−1	65	2015 Copa Sudamericana First Stage
5	Junior	42	18	10	14	44	41	+3	64	2015 Copa Sudamericana First Stage
6	Independiente Medellín	44	17	12	15	68	63	+5	63	
7	Millonarios	40	16	11	13	51	44	+7	59	
8	Atlético Huila	42	15	12	15	56	50	+6	57	
9	Deportivo Cali	42	15	10	17	53	60	−7	55	
10	Alianza Petrolera	36	15	9	12	40	44	−4	54	
11	Deportes Tolima	42	12	14	16	51	64	−13	50	2015 Copa Sudamericana First Stage (Note: Deportes Tolima are qualified for the 2015 Copa Sudamericana as the 2014 Copa Colombia winners.)
12	Envigado	38	14	6	18	47	50	−3	48	
13	Boyacá Chicó	36	12	11	13	42	38	+4	47	
14	Patriotas	36	12	9	15	39	54	−15	45	
15	La Equidad	38	10	12	16	34	50	−16	42	
16	Deportivo Pasto	36	7	17	12	43	49	−6	38	
17	Fortaleza	36	8	14	14	40	47	−7	38	
18	Uniautónoma	36	8	11	17	35	53	−18	35	

(C) Champions
