= 2013 Superliga Colombiana =

Millonarios	Santa Fe
1	3
- on aggregate

First leg
Millonarios	Santa Fe
1	2
- Date: 24 January 2013
- Venue: Estadio El Campín, Bogotá
- Referee: Wilson Lamouroux

Second leg
Santa Fe	Millonarios
1	0
- Date: 27 January 2013
- Venue: Estadio El Campín, Bogotá
- Referee: Ímer Machado

The 2013 Superliga Colombiana was the second edition of the Superliga Colombiana. Santa Fe was the winner of the tournament.

== Teams ==
Team	Qualification
Santa Fe	2012 Apertura champion
Millonarios	2012 Finalización champion

== Matches ==
=== First leg ===
January 24, 2013
19:00 UTC−5

Millonarios	1–2	Santa Fe
Franco 51'	Report	Arias 18', 74'

Estadio El Campín, Bogotá
Attendance: 32,000
Referee: Wilson Lamouroux

=== Second leg ===
January 27, 2013
15:15 UTC−5

Santa Fe	1–0	Millonarios
Valdés 45+1'	Report

Estadio El Campín, Bogotá
Attendance: 25,000
Referee: Ímer Machado
