= 2015 Superliga Colombiana =

Atlético Nacional	Santa Fe
2	3
- on aggregate

First leg
Atlético Nacional	Santa Fe
2	1
- Date: 24 January 2015
- Venue: Estadio Atanasio Girardot, Medellín
- Referee: Wilson Lamouroux

Second leg
Santa Fe	Atlético Nacional
2	0
- Date: 27 January 2015
- Venue: Estadio El Campín, Bogotá
- Referee: Luis Sánchez

The 2015 Superliga Colombiana was the fourth edition of the Superliga Colombiana.

Santa Fe was the winner and qualified for the 2015 Copa Sudamericana.

== Teams ==
Team	Qualification	Previous appearances (bold indicates winners)
Atlético Nacional	2014 Apertura champions	2 (**2012**, 2014)
Santa Fe	2014 Finalización champions	1 (**2013**)

== Matches ==
=== First leg ===
24 January 2015
19:00 UTC−5

Atlético Nacional	2–1	Santa Fe
Copete 13'; Ruiz 57' (pen.)	Report	Morelo 44'

Estadio Atanasio Girardot, Medellín
Attendance: 25,072
Referee: Wilson Lamouroux

**Atlético Nacional**	**Santa Fe**

=== Second leg ===
27 January 2015
19:30 UTC−5

Santa Fe	2–0	Atlético Nacional
Mina 34'; Páez 59'	Report

Estadio El Campín, Bogotá
Attendance: 25,000
Referee: Luis Sánchez

**Santa Fe**	**Atlético Nacional**
