= 2015 Copa Sudamericana =

Tournament details
- Dates: 11 August – 9 December 2015
- Teams: 47 (from 10 associations)

Final positions
- Champions: (Colombia) Santa Fe (1st title)
- Runners-up: (Argentina) Huracán

Tournament statistics
- Matches played: 92
- Goals scored: 186 (2.02 per match)
- Top scorer(s): (Argentina) Ramón Ábila (Ecuador) Miller Bolaños (Colombia) Wilson Morelo (Paraguay) José Ariel Núñez (5 goals each)
- Best player: (Argentina) Ramón Ábila

The 2015 Copa Sudamericana (Portuguese: Copa Sul-Americana 2015) (officially the 2015 Copa Total Sudamericana for sponsorship reasons) was the 14th edition of the Copa Sudamericana, South America's secondary club football tournament organized by CONMEBOL.

Colombian team Santa Fe qualified to play in the 2016 Copa Libertadores, the 2016 Recopa Sudamericana, and the 2016 Suruga Bank Championship, after winning the final against Argentinian team Huracán 3–1 on penalties (0–0 on aggregate after extra time). River Plate were the defending champions, but were eliminated by Huracán in the semifinals.

== Teams ==
The following 47 teams from the 10 CONMEBOL associations qualified for the tournament:

- Title holders
- Brazil: 8 berths
- Argentina: 6 berths
- All other associations: 4 berths each

The entry stage was determined as follows:

- Round of 16: Title holders
- Second stage: 14 teams (teams from Argentina and Brazil)
- First stage: 32 teams (teams from all other associations)

| Association | Team (Berth) | Entry stage | Qualification method |
|---|---|---|---|
| (Argentina) Argentina; 6 + 1 berths | River Plate (Title holders) | Round of 16 | 2014 Copa Sudamericana champion |
| (Argentina) Argentina; 6 + 1 berths | Huracán (Argentina 1) | Second stage | 2014 Supercopa Argentina champion |
| (Argentina) Argentina; 6 + 1 berths | Lanús (Argentina 2) | Second stage | 2014 Torneo Transición best team not qualified for 2015 Copa Libertadores second stage |
| (Argentina) Argentina; 6 + 1 berths | Independiente (Argentina 3) | Second stage | 2014 Torneo Transición 2nd best team not qualified for 2015 Copa Libertadores second stage |
| (Argentina) Argentina; 6 + 1 berths | Tigre (Argentina 4) | Second stage | 2014 Torneo Transición 3rd best team not qualified for 2015 Copa Libertadores second stage |
| (Argentina) Argentina; 6 + 1 berths | Arsenal (Argentina 5) | Second stage | 2014 Torneo Transición 4th best team not qualified for 2015 Copa Libertadores second stage |
| (Argentina) Argentina; 6 + 1 berths | Belgrano (Argentina 6) | Second stage | 2014 Torneo Transición 5th best team not qualified for 2015 Copa Libertadores second stage |
| (Bolivia) Bolivia; 4 berths | Real Potosí (Bolivia 1) | First stage | 2014 Clausura 4th place |
| (Bolivia) Bolivia; 4 berths | Bolívar (Bolivia 2) | First stage | 2014 Clausura 5th place |
| (Bolivia) Bolivia; 4 berths | Aurora (Bolivia 3) | First stage | 2014 Clausura 6th place |
| (Bolivia) Bolivia; 4 berths | Oriente Petrolero (Bolivia 4) | First stage | 2014 Clausura 7th place |
| (Brazil) Brazil; 8 berths | Atlético Paranaense (Brazil 1) | Second stage | 2014 Série A or 2014 Série B best team eliminated before 2015 Copa do Brasil round of 16 |
| (Brazil) Brazil; 8 berths | Sport Recife (Brazil 2) | Second stage | 2014 Série A or 2014 Série B 2nd best team eliminated before 2015 Copa do Brasil round of 16 |
| (Brazil) Brazil; 8 berths | Goiás (Brazil 3) | Second stage | 2014 Série A or 2014 Série B 3rd best team eliminated before 2015 Copa do Brasil round of 16 |
| (Brazil) Brazil; 8 berths | Chapecoense (Brazil 4) | Second stage | 2014 Série A or 2014 Série B 4th best team eliminated before 2015 Copa do Brasil round of 16 |
| (Brazil) Brazil; 8 berths | Joinville (Brazil 5) | Second stage | 2014 Série A or 2014 Série B 5th best team eliminated before 2015 Copa do Brasil round of 16 |
| (Brazil) Brazil; 8 berths | Ponte Preta (Brazil 6) | Second stage | 2014 Série A or 2014 Série B 6th best team eliminated before 2015 Copa do Brasil round of 16 |
| (Brazil) Brazil; 8 berths | Bahia (Brazil 7) | Second stage | 2015 Copa do Nordeste best team eliminated before 2015 Copa do Brasil round of 16 |
| (Brazil) Brazil; 8 berths | Brasília (Brazil 8) | Second stage | 2014 Copa Verde champion |
| (Chile) Chile; 4 berths | Universidad de Concepción (Chile 1) | First stage | 2014–15 Copa Chile champion |
| (Chile) Chile; 4 berths | Huachipato (Chile 2) | First stage | 2014–15 Primera División aggregate table 2nd best team not qualified for 2015 Copa Libertadores second stage |
| (Chile) Chile; 4 berths | Universidad Católica (Chile 3) | First stage | 2015 Clausura Liguilla winner |
| (Chile) Chile; 4 berths | Santiago Wanderers (Chile 4) | First stage | 2014 Apertura Liguilla runner-up |
| (Colombia) Colombia; 4 berths | Deportes Tolima (Colombia 1) | First stage | 2014 Copa Colombia champion |
| (Colombia) Colombia; 4 berths | Santa Fe (Colombia 2) | First stage | 2015 Superliga Colombiana champion |
| (Colombia) Colombia; 4 berths | Águilas Doradas (Colombia 3) | First stage | 2014 Primera A aggregate table best team not qualified for 2015 Copa Libertadores |
| (Colombia) Colombia; 4 berths | Junior (Colombia 4) | First stage | 2014 Primera A aggregate table 2nd best team not qualified for 2015 Copa Libertadores |
| (Ecuador) Ecuador; 4 berths | Emelec (Ecuador 1) | First stage | 2014 Serie A champion |
| (Ecuador) Ecuador; 4 berths | LDU Quito (Ecuador 2) | First stage | 2014 Serie A aggregate table best team not qualified for 2015 Copa Libertadores |
| (Ecuador) Ecuador; 4 berths | LDU Loja (Ecuador 3) | First stage | 2014 Serie A aggregate table 2nd best team not qualified for 2015 Copa Libertadores |
| (Ecuador) Ecuador; 4 berths | Universidad Católica (Ecuador 4) | First stage | 2014 Serie A aggregate table 3rd best team not qualified for 2015 Copa Libertadores |
| (Paraguay) Paraguay; 4 berths | Libertad (Paraguay 1) | First stage | 2014 Apertura champion and 2014 Clausura champion |
| (Paraguay) Paraguay; 4 berths | Sportivo Luqueño (Paraguay 2) | First stage | 2014 Primera División aggregate table best team not qualified for 2015 Copa Libertadores |
| (Paraguay) Paraguay; 4 berths | Olimpia (Paraguay 3) | First stage | 2014 Primera División aggregate table 2nd best team not qualified for 2015 Copa Libertadores |
| (Paraguay) Paraguay; 4 berths | Nacional (Paraguay 4) | First stage | 2014 Primera División aggregate table 3rd best team not qualified for 2015 Copa Libertadores |
| (Peru) Peru; 4 berths | Melgar (Peru 1) | First stage | 2014 Descentralizado aggregate table best team not qualified for 2015 Copa Libertadores |
| (Peru) Peru; 4 berths | Unión Comercio (Peru 2) | First stage | 2014 Descentralizado aggregate table 2nd best team not qualified for 2015 Copa Libertadores |
| (Peru) Peru; 4 berths | Universitario (Peru 3) | First stage | 2014 Descentralizado aggregate table 3rd best team not qualified for 2015 Copa Libertadores |
| (Peru) Peru; 4 berths | León de Huánuco (Peru 4) | First stage | 2014 Descentralizado aggregate table 4th best team not qualified for 2015 Copa Libertadores |
| (Uruguay) Uruguay; 4 berths | Nacional (Uruguay 1) | First stage | 2014–15 Primera División champion |
| (Uruguay) Uruguay; 4 berths | Danubio (Uruguay 2) | First stage | 2014–15 Primera División aggregate table best team not qualified for 2016 Copa Libertadores |
| (Uruguay) Uruguay; 4 berths | Defensor Sporting (Uruguay 3) | First stage | 2014–15 Primera División aggregate table 2nd best team not qualified for 2016 Copa Libertadores |
| (Uruguay) Uruguay; 4 berths | Juventud (Uruguay 4) | First stage | 2014–15 Primera División aggregate table 3rd best team not qualified for 2016 Copa Libertadores |
| (Venezuela) Venezuela; 4 berths | Deportivo La Guaira (Venezuela 1) | First stage | 2014 Copa Venezuela champion |
| (Venezuela) Venezuela; 4 berths | Deportivo Anzoátegui (Venezuela 2) | First stage | 2014–15 Primera División aggregate table 2nd best team not qualified for 2016 Copa Libertadores |
| (Venezuela) Venezuela; 4 berths | Zamora (Venezuela 3) | First stage | 2014–15 Primera División Serie Sudamericana winner with better record in aggregate table |
| (Venezuela) Venezuela; 4 berths | Carabobo (Venezuela 4) | First stage | 2014–15 Primera División Serie Sudamericana winner with worse record in aggregate table |

== Draw ==
Location of teams of the 2015 Copa Sudamericana.

The draw of the tournament was held on July 16, 2015, at the CONMEBOL Convention Centre in Luque, Paraguay.

For the first stage, the 32 teams were divided into two zones:

- South Zone: The 16 teams from Bolivia, Chile, Paraguay, and Uruguay were drawn into eight ties.
- North Zone: The 16 teams from Colombia, Ecuador, Peru, and Venezuela were drawn into eight ties.

Teams which qualified for berths 1 were drawn against teams which qualified for berths 4, and teams which qualified for berths 2 were drawn against teams which qualified for berths 3, with the former hosting the second leg in both cases. Teams from the same association could not be drawn into the same tie.

For the second stage, the 30 teams, including the 16 winners of the first stage (eight from South Zone, eight from North Zone), whose identity was not known at the time of the draw, and the 14 teams which entered the second stage, were divided into three sections:

- Winners of the first stage: The 16 winners of the first stage were drawn into eight ties, with the order of legs decided by draw. Teams from the same association could be drawn into the same tie.
- Brazil: The eight teams from Brazil were drawn into four ties. Teams which qualified for berths 1–4 were drawn against teams which qualified for berths 5–8, with the former hosting the second leg.
- Argentina: The six teams from Argentina were drawn into three ties. Teams which qualified for berths 1–3 were drawn against teams which qualified for berths 4–6, with the former hosting the second leg.

== Schedule ==
The schedule of the competition was as follows (all dates listed were Wednesdays, but matches could also be played on Tuesdays and Thursdays as well).

| Stage | First leg | Second leg |
|---|---|---|
| First stage | August 12 | August 19 |
| Second stage | August 19, 26 | August 26; September 16 |
| Round of 16 | September 23 | September 30 |
| Quarterfinals | October 21 | October 28 |
| Semifinals | November 4 | November 25 |
| Finals | December 2 | December 9 |

Notes

1. ^{†} For matches involving teams from Brazil.

== Elimination stages ==
In the elimination stages (first stage and second stage), each tie was played on a home-and-away two-legged basis. If tied on aggregate, the away goals rule was used. If still tied, the penalty shoot-out was used to determine the winner (no extra time was played). The 15 winners of the second stage (eight from winners of the first stage, four from Brazil, three from Argentina) advanced to the round of 16 to join the defending champions (River Plate).

=== First stage ===
| Team 1 | Agg. | Team 2 | 1st leg | 2nd leg |
South Zone
| Juventud (Uruguay) | 4–3 | (Bolivia) Real Potosí | 4–1 | 0–2 |
| Oriente Petrolero (Bolivia) | 0–3 | (Uruguay) Nacional | 0–3 | 0–0 |
| Santiago Wanderers (Chile) | 1–2 | (Paraguay) Libertad | 0–0 | 1–2 |
| Nacional (Paraguay) | 5–2 | (Chile) Universidad de Concepción | 2–1 | 3–1 |
| Defensor Sporting (Uruguay) | 3–2 | (Bolivia) Bolívar | 3–0 | 0–2 |
| Universidad Católica (Chile) | 3–1 | (Uruguay) Danubio | 1–0 | 2–1 |
| Olimpia (Paraguay) | 4–0 | (Chile) Huachipato | 2–0 | 2–0 |
| Aurora (Bolivia) | 2–7 | (Paraguay) Sportivo Luqueño | 1–2 | 1–5 |
North Zone
| Carabobo (Venezuela) | 0–0 (1–3 p) | (Colombia) Deportes Tolima | 0–0 | 0–0 |
| Universidad Católica (Ecuador) | 1–2 | (Venezuela) Deportivo La Guaira | 1–1 | 0–1 |
| León de Huánuco (Peru) | 1–6 | (Ecuador) Emelec | 1–3 | 0–3 |
| Junior (Colombia) | 5–4 | (Peru) Melgar | 5–0 | 0–4 |
| Universitario (Peru) | 6–2 | (Venezuela) Deportivo Anzoátegui | 3–1 | 3–1 |
| Zamora (Venezuela) | 1–3 | (Ecuador) LDU Quito | 1–1 | 0–2 |
| Águilas Doradas (Colombia) | 3–1 | (Peru) Unión Comercio | 2–0 | 1–1 |
| LDU Loja (Ecuador) | 0–3 | (Colombia) Santa Fe | 0–0 | 0–3 |

=== Second stage ===
| Team 1 | Agg. | Team 2 | 1st leg | 2nd leg |
|---|---|---|---|---|
| LDU Quito (Ecuador) | 2–0 | (Paraguay) Nacional | 1–0 | 1–0 |
| Defensor Sporting (Uruguay) | 4–0 | (Peru) Universitario | 3–0 | 1–0 |
| Nacional (Uruguay) | 1–2 | (Colombia) Santa Fe | 0–2 | 1–0 |
| Deportivo La Guaira (Venezuela) | 1–5 | (Paraguay) Sportivo Luqueño | 1–1 | 0–4 |
| Brasília (Brazil) | 2–0 | (Brazil) Goiás | 0–0 | 2–0 |
| Olimpia (Paraguay) | 3–2 | (Colombia) Águilas Doradas | 1–1 | 2–1 |
| Tigre (Argentina) | 2–6 | (Argentina) Huracán | 2–5 | 0–1 |
| Ponte Preta (Brazil) | 1–4 | (Brazil) Chapecoense | 1–1 | 0–3 |
| Universidad Católica (Chile) | 2–4 | (Paraguay) Libertad | 2–3 | 0–1 |
| Bahia (Brazil) | 2–4 | (Brazil) Sport Recife | 1–0 | 1–4 |
| Arsenal (Argentina) | 1–2 | (Argentina) Independiente | 1–1 | 0–1 |
| Joinville (Brazil) | 0–3 | (Brazil) Atlético Paranaense | 0–2 | 0–1 |
| Deportes Tolima (Colombia) | 2–1 | (Colombia) Junior | 0–1 | 2–0 |
| Emelec (Ecuador) | 0–0 (3–2 p) | (Uruguay) Juventud | 0–0 | 0–0 |
| Belgrano (Argentina) | 2–6 | (Argentina) Lanús | 1–1 | 1–5 |

== Final stages ==
In the final stages, the 16 teams played a single-elimination tournament, with the following rules:

- Each tie was played on a home-and-away two-legged basis, with the higher-seeded team hosting the second leg.
- In the round of 16, quarterfinals, and semifinals, if tied on aggregate, the away goals rule would be used. If still tied, the penalty shoot-out would be used to determine the winner (no extra time would be played).
- In the finals, if tied on aggregate, the away goals rule would not be used, and 30 minutes of extra time would be played. If still tied after extra time, the penalty shoot-out would be used to determine the winner.
- If there were two semifinalists from the same association, they would have to play each other.

The qualified teams were seeded in the final stages according to the draw of the tournament, with each team assigned a "seed" 1–16 by draw.

=== Bracket ===
Round of 16
16 | (Argentina) River Plate | 2 | 0 | 2
1 | (Ecuador) LDU Quito | 0 | 1 | 1
9 | (Paraguay) Libertad | 1 | 1 | 2 (3)
8 | (Brazil) Chapecoense (p) | 1 | 1 | 2 (5)
10 | (Brazil) Sport Recife | 1 | 0 | 1
7 | (Argentina) Huracán | 1 | 3 | 4
15 | (Argentina) Lanús | 0 | 0 | 0 (3)
2 | (Uruguay) Defensor Sporting (p) | 0 | 0 | 0 (5)
12 | (Brazil) Atlético Paranaense | 1 | 0 | 1
5 | (Brazil) Brasília | 0 | 0 | 0
13 | (Colombia) Deportes Tolima | 1 | 0 | 1
4 | (Paraguay) Sportivo Luqueño | 1 | 1 | 2
11 | (Argentina) Independiente | 1 | 0 | 1
6 | (Paraguay) Olimpia | 0 | 0 | 0
14 | (Ecuador) Emelec | 2 | 0 | 2
3 | (Colombia) Santa Fe (a) | 1 | 1 | 2

Quarterfinals
16 | (Argentina) River Plate | 3 | 1 | 4
8 | (Brazil) Chapecoense | 1 | 2 | 3
7 | (Argentina) Huracán | 1 | 0 | 1
2 | (Uruguay) Defensor Sporting | 0 | 0 | 0
12 | (Brazil) Atlético Paranaense | 1 | 0 | 1
4 | (Paraguay) Sportivo Luqueño | 0 | 2 | 2
11 | (Argentina) Independiente | 0 | 1 | 1
3 | (Colombia) Santa Fe | 1 | 1 | 2

Semifinals
16 | (Argentina) River Plate | 0 | 2 | 2
7 | (Argentina) Huracán | 1 | 2 | 3
4 | (Paraguay) Sportivo Luqueño | 1 | 0 | 1
3 | (Colombia) Santa Fe (a) | 1 | 0 | 1

Finals
7 | (Argentina) Huracán | 0 | 0 | 0 (1)
3 | (Colombia) Santa Fe (p) | 0 | 0 | 0 (3)

=== Round of 16 ===
| Team 1 | Agg. | Team 2 | 1st leg | 2nd leg |
|---|---|---|---|---|
| River Plate (Argentina) | 2–1 | (Ecuador) LDU Quito | 2–0 | 0–1 |
| Lanús (Argentina) | 0–0 (3–5 p) | (Uruguay) Defensor Sporting | 0–0 | 0–0 |
| Emelec (Ecuador) | 2–2 (a) | (Colombia) Santa Fe | 2–1 | 0–1 |
| Deportes Tolima (Colombia) | 1–2 | (Paraguay) Sportivo Luqueño | 1–1 | 0–1 |
| Atlético Paranaense (Brazil) | 1–0 | (Brazil) Brasília | 1–0 | 0–0 |
| Independiente (Argentina) | 1–0 | (Paraguay) Olimpia | 1–0 | 0–0 |
| Sport Recife (Brazil) | 1–4 | (Argentina) Huracán | 1–1 | 0–3 |
| Libertad (Paraguay) | 2–2 (3–5 p) | (Brazil) Chapecoense | 1–1 | 1–1 |

=== Quarterfinals ===
| Team 1 | Agg. | Team 2 | 1st leg | 2nd leg |
|---|---|---|---|---|
| River Plate (Argentina) | 4–3 | (Brazil) Chapecoense | 3–1 | 1–2 |
| Huracán (Argentina) | 1–0 | (Uruguay) Defensor Sporting | 1–0 | 0–0 |
| Independiente (Argentina) | 1–2 | (Colombia) Santa Fe | 0–1 | 1–1 |
| Atlético Paranaense (Brazil) | 1–2 | (Paraguay) Sportivo Luqueño | 1–0 | 0–2 |

=== Semifinals ===
Since there were two semifinalists from Argentina, they had to play each other instead of their original opponents as determined by the seeding.

| Team 1 | Agg. | Team 2 | 1st leg | 2nd leg |
|---|---|---|---|---|
| Sportivo Luqueño (Paraguay) | 1–1 (a) | (Colombia) Santa Fe | 1–1 | 0–0 |
| River Plate (Argentina) | 2–3 | (Argentina) Huracán | 0–1 | 2–2 |

=== Finals ===
The finals were played on a home-and-away two-legged basis, with the higher-seeded team hosting the second leg. If tied on aggregate, the away goals rule would not be used, and 30 minutes of extra time would be played. If still tied after extra time, the penalty shoot-out would be used to determine the winner.

December 2, 2015
21:00 UTC−3

| Huracán (Argentina) | 0–0 | (Colombia) Santa Fe |
|---|---|---|
| | Report |

Estadio Tomás Adolfo Ducó, Buenos Aires
Referee: Antonio Arias (Paraguay)

December 9, 2015
19:00 UTC−5

| Santa Fe (Colombia) | 0–0 (a.e.t.) | (Argentina) Huracán |
|---|---|---|
| | Report |
Penalties
| Pérez (penalty scored); Seijas (penalty scored); Balanta (penalty scored) | 3–1 | (penalty missed) Bogado; (penalty missed) Nervo; (penalty scored) Mancinelli; (penalty missed) Toranzo |

Estadio El Campín, Bogotá
Referee: Héber Lopes (Brazil)

Tied 0–0 on aggregate, Santa Fe won on penalties.

== Top goalscorers ==
| Rank | Player | Team | Goals |
|---|---|---|---|
| 1 | (Argentina) Ramón Ábila | (Argentina) Huracán | 5 |
| 1 | (Ecuador) Miller Bolaños | (Ecuador) Emelec | 5 |
| 1 | (Colombia) Wilson Morelo | (Colombia) Santa Fe | 5 |
| 1 | (Paraguay) José Ariel Núñez | (Paraguay) Olimpia | 5 |
| 5 | (Argentina) Guido Di Vanni | (Paraguay) Sportivo Luqueño | 4 |
| 5 | (Argentina) Cristian Espinoza | (Argentina) Huracán | 4 |
| 5 | (Paraguay) Jorge Ortega | (Paraguay) Sportivo Luqueño | 4 |
| 8 | (Argentina) Mauro Bogado | (Argentina) Huracán | 3 |
| 8 | (Paraguay) José Leguizamón | (Paraguay) Sportivo Luqueño | 3 |
| 8 | (Uruguay) Hernán Rodrigo López | (Paraguay) Libertad | 3 |
| 8 | (Uruguay) Matías Mirabaje | (Uruguay) Juventud | 3 |
| 8 | (Uruguay) Rodrigo Mora | (Argentina) River Plate | 3 |
| 8 | (Uruguay) Carlos Andrés Sánchez | (Argentina) River Plate | 3 |

== See also ==
- 2015 Copa Libertadores
- 2016 Recopa Sudamericana
- 2016 Suruga Bank Championship
