= 2011–12 Club Atlético River Plate season =

River Plate
2011–12 season
- President: Daniel Passarella
- Manager: Matías Almeyda
- Primera B Nacional: 1st (promoted)
- Copa Argentina: Semi-final (vs. Racing)
- Top goalscorer: League: Fernando Cavenaghi (19); All: Fernando Cavenaghi (19)
- Biggest win: River 7–1 Atlanta
- Biggest defeat: River 0–2 Atlético Tucumán
Home colours	Away colours

The 2011-12 season was River Plate's first season in the Primera B Nacional, following relegation from the Primera División in 2011. It was Matías Almeyda's first season in charge at the club.

== Season review ==
See also 2011–12 Primera B Nacional

On 19 December 2011, David Trezeguet joined River Plate on a three-year deal after terminating his contract on 21 November 2011 with Baniyas of the UAE Pro-League.

== Transfers ==
=== In ===
Pos.	Name	From	Fee
FW	Fernando Cavenaghi	(France) Bordeaux	Free
MF	Alejandro Domínguez	(Spain) Valencia	Loan
DF	Agustín Alayes	(Chile) Colo-Colo	Free
MF	Martín Aguirre	(Argentina) Godoy Cruz	US$0.4M
MF	Carlos Sánchez	(Argentina) Godoy Cruz	US$2.5M
DF	Luciano Vella	(Argentina) Newell's Old Boys	Free
DF	Cristian Ledesma	(Argentina) Colón	US$0.46M
MF	Leonardo Ponzio	(Spain) Real Zaragoza	Free
FW	David Trezeguet	(United Arab Emirates) Baniyas	Free

=== Out ===
Pos.	Name	To	Fee
FW	Fabián Bordagaray	(Argentina) Argentinos Juniors
MF	Roberto Pereyra	(Italy) Udinese
MF	Erik Lamela	(Italy) Roma	up to €19 million.

== Squad ==
Note: Flags indicate national team as defined under FIFA eligibility rules; some limited exceptions apply. Players may hold more than one non-FIFA nationality.

No.	Pos.	Nation	Player
1	GK	ARG	Daniel Vega
2	DF	ARG	Jonatan Maidana
3	DF	URU	Juan Manuel Diaz
4	DF	ARG	Luciano Abecasis
5	MF	ARG	Leonardo Ponzio
6	DF	ARG	Ramiro Funes Mori
7	MF	ARG	Martin Aguirre
8	MF	URU	Carlos Sanchez
9	FW	ARG	Fernando Cavenaghi (Captain)
10	FW	ARG	Alejandro Domínguez (Vice-captain)
11	MF	ARG	Lucas Ocampos
12	GK	ARG	Leandro Chichizola
13	DF	ARG	Carlos Arano

No.	Pos.	Nation	Player
14	DF	ARG	Luciano Vella
15	MF	ARG	Ezequiel Cirigliano
16	DF	ARG	Leandro González Pirez
17	FW	FRA	David Trezeguet
18	FW	ARG	Rogelio Funes Mori
19	MF	VEN	César González
20	DF	ARG	German Pezzella
21	FW	ARG	Daniel Villalva
22	DF	ARG	Alexis Ferrero
23	FW	ARG	Andres Rios
24	MF	ARG	Nicolas Domingo
25	MF	ARG	Cristian Ledesma

=== On loan ===
Note: Flags indicate national team as defined under FIFA eligibility rules; some limited exceptions apply. Players may hold more than one non-FIFA nationality.

No.	Pos.	Nation	Player
-	MF	ARG	Manuel Lanzini (at Fluminense)
-	MF	ARG	Walter Acevedo (at Banfield)
-	DF	ARG	Maximiliano Coronel (at All Boys)

No.	Pos.	Nation	Player
-	DF	ARG	Alejandro Espinoza (at Atlético Tucumán)
-	DF	ARG	Lucas Orbán (at Tigre)

== Competitions ==
=== Summer recess mid-season friendlies ===
14 January 2012 Friendly	Estudiantes	0–0	River Plate	Mar del Plata
22.10 (UTC -3)		Summary		Stadium: Estadio José María Minella; Attendance: 15.000; Referee: Germán Delfino

19 January 2012 Friendly	River Plate	2–1	Racing Club	Mar del Plata
22.10 (UTC -3)	Ro. Funes Mori 6'; Trezeguet 84'	Summary	Gutiérrez 86'	Stadium: Estadio José María Minella; Referee: Pablo Lunati

25 January 2012 Friendly	Boca Juniors	2–0	River Plate	Resistencia, Chaco
22.10 (UTC -3)	Blandi 6', 79'	Report		Stadium: Estadio Centenario; Referee: Diego Abal

29 January 2012 Friendly	River Plate	0–1	Boca Juniors	Mendoza
22.10 (UTC -3)		Report	Mouche 28'	Stadium: Estadio Malvinas Argentinas; Referee: Saúl Laverni

=== Primera B Nacional ===
==== Results summary ====
Overall								Home						Away					
Pld	W	D	L	GF	GA	GD	Pts	W	D	L	GF	GA	GD	W	D	L	GF	GA	GD
38	20	13	5	66	28	+38	73	13	4	2	37	12	+25	7	9	3	29	16	+13

Last updated: 7 December 2011.
Source: Soccerway

==== Results by round ====
Round	1	2	3	4	5	6	7	8	9	10	11	12	13	14	15	16	17	18	19	20	21	22	23	24	25	26	27	28	29	30	31	32	33	34	35	36	37	38
Ground	H	A	H	A	H	A	H	A	H	A	A	H	A	H	A	H	A	H	A	A	H	A	H	A	H	A	H	A	H	H	A	H	A	H	A	H	A	H
Result	W	W	W	D	D	D	W	D	W	W	D	L	W	L	W	D	L	W	D	W	W	W	D	D	W	D	W	L	W	W	D	W	W	D	D	W	L	W
Position	7	1	1	1	2	2	1	1	1	1	1	2	1	2	2	2	2	2	2	1	1	1	2	2	2	2	2	2	2	2	2	2	1	2	2	1	1	1

Source: Soccerway
A = Away; H = Home; W = Win; D = Draw; L = Loss

==== Fixtures and results ====
16 August 2011 Round 1	River Plate	1–0	Chacarita Juniors	Buenos Aires
	J. Díaz 6'	Summary		Stadium: Estadio Monumental Antonio Vespucio Liberti; Attendance: 32,000; Referee: Héctor Baldassi

20 August 2011 Round 2	Independiente Rivadavia	1–3	River Plate	Mendoza
	Ferradas 8'	Summary	Ocampos 35'; Aguirre 39'; Sánchez 69'	Stadium: Estadio Malvinas Argentinas; Attendance: 33,000; Referee: Diego Abal

27 August 2011 Round 3	River Plate	3–1	Sportivo Desamparados	Buenos Aires
	Ocampos 35'; Sánchez 45'; Domínguez 71'	Summary	Rosso 60'; Barth (yellow card) 80' (yellow-red card) 80'	Stadium: Estadio Tomás Adolfo Ducó; Attendance: Closed; Referee: Gabriel Fabale

3 September 2011 Round 4	Quilmes	1–1	River Plate	Quilmes
	Telechea 90+1'	Summary	Cavenaghi 35'	Stadium: Estadio Centenario Dr. José Luis Meiszner; Attendance: 30,000; Referee: Pablo Lunati

10 September 2011 Round 5	River Plate	2–2	Defensa y Justicia	Buenos Aires
	Cavenaghi 35'; Ro. Funes Mori 89'	Summary	Píriz 41', 58'	Stadium: Estadio Pedro Bidegain; Attendance: Closed; Referee: Germán Delfino

17 September 2011 Round 6	Deportivo Merlo	0–0	River Plate	Avellaneda
		Summary		Stadium: Estadio Libertadores de América; Attendance: 28,000; Referee: Mauro Vigliano

24 September 2011 Round 7	River Plate	2–0	Gimnasia (La Plata)	Buenos Aires
	Ro. Funes Mori 48'; J. Díaz 68'	Summary		Stadium: Estadio Monumental Antonio Vespucio Liberti; Attendance: 32,000; Referee: Alejandro Toia

1 October 2011 Round 8	Ferro Carril Oeste	0–0	River Plate	Buenos Aires
		Summary		Stadium: Estadio Pedro Bidegain; Attendance: 25,000; Referee: Diego Ceballos

5 October 2011 Round 9	River Plate	7–1	Atlanta	Buenos Aires
	Aguirre 13'; Cavenaghi 19', 56', 58'; Ocampos 44'; Bordagaray 71'; Ríos 84'	Summary	Soriano 87'	Stadium: Estadio Pedro Bidegain; Attendance: 30,000; Referee: Juan Pablo Pompei

9 October 2011 Round 10	Huracán	1–2	River Plate	Buenos Aires
	Machín 8'	Summary	Aguirre 14', 20'	Stadium: Estadio Tomás Adolfo Ducó; Attendance: 40,000; Referee: Carlos Maglio

15 October 2011 Round 11	Instituto	0–0	River Plate	Córdoba
	Erpen (yellow card) 57' (yellow-red card) 67'	Summary		Stadium: Estadio Mario Alberto Kempes; Attendance: 57,000; Referee: Germán Delfino

29 October 2011 Round 12	River Plate	1–2	Aldosivi	Buenos Aires
	Cavenaghi 48'	Summary	Furios 22'; Zunino 84'	Stadium: Estadio Pedro Bidegain; Attendance: 30,000; Referee: Pablo Díaz

5 November 2011 Round 13	Gimnasia (Jujuy)	1–4	River Plate	San Salvador de Jujuy
	Minici 87'	Summary	Cavenaghi 24' (pen.), 50', 68', 90'	Stadium: Estadio 23 de Agosto; Attendance: 29,000; Referee: Pablo Lunati

13 November 2011 Round 14	River Plate	0–2	Atlético Tucumán	Buenos Aires
		Summary	Rodríguez 13'; Montiglio 22'	Stadium: Estadio Monumental Antonio Vespucio Liberti; Attendance: 45,000; Referee: Gabriel Favale

19 November 2011 Round 15	Guillermo Brown	1–4	River Plate	Puerto Madryn
	Bottino 88'	Summary	Ocampos 35'; Domínguez 46'; Cavenaghi 57', 78'	Stadium: Estadio Raul Conti; Attendance: 14,500; Referee: Carlos Maglio

26 November 2011 Round 16	River Plate	1–1	Rosario Central	Buenos Aires
	Cavenaghi 78'	Summary	Castillejos 48'	Stadium: Estadio Monumental Antonio Vespucio Liberti; Attendance: 40,000; Referee: Hector Baldassi

3 December 2011 Round 17	Boca Unidos	1–0	River Plate	Corrientes
	Cristian Núñez 90'	Summary		Stadium: Estadio José Antonio Romero Feris; Attendance: 14,000; Referee: Alejandro Toia

12 December 2011 Round 18	River Plate	1–0	Patronato	Buenos Aires
	Sánchez 71'	Summary		Stadium: Estadio Monumental Antonio Vespucio Liberti; Attendance: 35,000; Referee: Juan Pablo Pompei

5 February 2012 Round 19	Almirante Brown	1–1	River Plate	Isidro Casanova
	Vega 24'	Summary	Cavenaghi 13'	Stadium: Estadio Fragata Presidente Sarmiento; Attendance: 25,000; Referee: Carlos Maglio

12 February 2012 Round 20	Chacarita Juniors	0–2	River Plate	La Plata
17:00 (UTC−03:00)		Summary	Toledo 33' (o.g.); Ocampos 39'	Stadium: Estadio Ciudad de La Plata; Attendance: 28,000; Referee: Luis Álvarez

18 February 2012 Round 21	River Plate	3–0	Independiente Rivadavia	Buenos Aires
19:10 (UTC−03:00)	Sánchez (yellow card) 11' (yellow-red card) 11'; Cavenaghi 27'; Domínguez 75'; Trezeguet 88'	Summary	Ayala (red card) 84'	Stadium: Estadio Monumental Antonio Vespucio Liberti; Attendance: 61,321; Referee: Germán Delfino

27 February 2012 Round 22	Sportivo Desamparados	1–4	River Plate	San Juan
21:15 (UTC−03:00)	Anívole 82'	Summaty	Ponzio 20'; Ro. Funes Mori 50'; Ra. Funes Mori 68'; Trezeguet 90'	Stadium: Estadio San Juan del Bicentenario; Attendance: 24,000; Referee: Saúl Laverni

20 March 2012 Round 23	River Plate	0–0	Quilmes	Buenos Aires
		Summary		Stadium: Estadio Monumental Antonio Vespucio Liberti; Attendance: 45,000; Referee: Pablo Lunati

7 March 2012 Round 24	Defensa y Justicia	3–3	River Plate	La Plata
	Díaz 8'; Ra. Funes Mori 53' (o.g.); Bustamante 61'	Summary	Ocampos 2'; Trezeguet 49', 68'	Stadium: Estadio Ciudad de La Plata; Attendance: 30,000; Referee: Juan Pablo Pompei

17 March 2012 Round 25	River Plate	3–0	Deportivo Merlo	Buenos Aires
18:15 (UTC−03:00)	Trezeguet 39'; Cavenaghi 71', 90'	Summary		Stadium: Estadio José Amalfitani; Attendance: 35,000; Referee: Pablo Díaz

24 March 2012 Round 26	Gimnasia (La Plata)	0–0	River Plate	La Plata
18:15 (UTC−03:00)	Goux (red card) 77'	Summary		Stadium: Estadio Juan Carlos Zerillo; Referee: Alejandro Toia

31 March 2012 Round 27	River Plate	3–0	Ferro Carril Oeste	Buenos Aires
	Ra. Funes Mori 77'; Trezeguet 81', 84'	Summary		Stadium: Estadio Monumental Antonio Vespucio Liberti

8 April 2012 Round 28	Atlanta	1–0	River Plate	Buenos Aires
	Lorefice 34'	Summary	Ra. Funes Mori (red card) 45+1'	Stadium: Estadio José Amalfitani

14 April 2012 Round 29	River Plate	2–0	Huracán	Buenos Aires
	González 58' (o.g.); Cavenaghi 81'	Summary	Ferrero (yellow card) 60' (yellow-red card) 60'; Tavio (red card) 83'	Stadium: Estadio Monumental Antonio Vespucio Liberti

21 April 2012 Round 30	River Plate	1–0	Instituto	Buenos Aires
	Trezeguet 56'	Summary	Damiani (red card) 65'	Stadium: Estadio Monumental Antonio Vespucio Liberti

29 April 2012 Round 31	Aldosivi	1–1	River Plate	Mar del Plata
	Briones (red card) 64'; Gigli 84'	Summary	Domínguez 61' (pen.)	Stadium: Estadio José María Minella

4 May 2012 Round 32	River Plate	1–0	Gimnasia (Jujuy)	Buenos Aires
	Trezeguet 67'	Summary		Stadium: Estadio Monumental Antonio Vespucio Liberti

12 May 2012 Round 33	Atlético Tucumán	2–4	River Plate	San Miguel de Tucumán
	Fondacaro 7'; Barone 83'	Summary	González 30'; Trezeguet 36' (pen.), 67'; Sánchez 85'	Stadium: Estadio Monumental Presidente Jose Fierro

19 May 2012 Round 34	River Plate	2–2	Guillermo Brown	Buenos Aires
	Cavenaghi 33'; Villalva 78'	Summary	Bottino 17'; Zanni 90'	Stadium: Estadio Monumental Antonio Vespucio Liberti

26 May 2012 Round 35	Rosario Central	0–0	River Plate	Rosario
		Summary		Stadium: Estadio Gigante de Arroyito

10 June 2012 Round 36	River Plate	2–1	Boca Unidos	Buenos Aires
	Ocampos 78'; Ro. Funes Mori 88'	Summary	Friedrich 81'	Stadium: Estadio Monumental Antonio Vespucio Liberti

16 June 2012 Round 37	Patronato	1–0	River Plate	Paraná, Entre Ríos
	Acosta 7'; Boggino (yellow card) 50' (yellow-red card) 86'	Summary		Stadium: Estadio Presbítero Bartolomé Grella

23 June 2012 Round 38	River Plate	2–0	Almirante Brown	Buenos Aires
	Trezeguet 49', 88'	Summary		Stadium: Estadio Monumental Antonio Vespucio Liberti; Referee: A. Toia

==== League table ====
Pos	Team	Pld	W	D	L	GF	GA	GD	Pts	Promotion or qualification
1	River Plate (C, P)	38	20	13	5	66	28	+38	73	Primera División
2	Quilmes (P)	38	20	12	6	62	21	+41	72	Primera División
3	Instituto (Q)	38	19	13	6	56	28	+28	70	Promotion Playoff Matches
4	Rosario Central (Q)	38	20	9	9	49	33	+16	69	Promotion Playoff Matches
5	Boca Unidos	38	16	9	13	55	48	+7	57	

Updated to match(es) played on June 23, 2012. Source: AFA
Rules for classification: 1st points; 2nd goal difference; 3rd goals scored; 4th head-to-head points; 5th head-to-head goal difference; 6th head-to-head goals scored. This does not apply to determining the champion. If two or more teams had been tied in point at the end of the tournament, a playoff would have been held at a neutral venue within 72 hours for the championship
(C) Champions; (P) Promoted; (Q) Qualified for the phase indicated

=== Copa Argentina ===
8 December 2011 Round of 64	Defensores de Belgrano	0–1	River Plate	San Juan, Argentina
		Summary	Domínguez 25'	Stadium: Estadio San Juan del Bicentenario

6 March 2012 Round of 32	Sportivo Belgrano	0–2	River Plate	Catamarca, Argentina
21.10 (UTC−03:00)		Summary	Aguirre 61'; Ro. Funes Mori 85'	Stadium: Estadio Ciudad de Catamarca; Attendance: 20.000; Referee: Diego Ceballos

11 April 2012 Round of 16	Quilmes	1–2	River Plate	San Juan, Argentina
22.10 (UTC−03:00)	Cauteruccio 87'	Summary	Trezeguet 26'; Villalva 76'	Stadium: Estadio San Juan del Bicentenario

16 May 2012 Quarterfinals	San Lorenzo	0–2	River Plate	Salta, Argentina
		Summary	Villalva 48'; Ro. Funes Mori 79'	Stadium: Estadio Padre Ernesto Martearena

3 June 2012 Semifinals	River Plate	0–0 (4–5 p)	Racing	Salta, Argentina
19:00 UTC-03:00		Summary		Stadium: Estadio Padre Ernesto Martearena
	Penalties
	Ponzio (penalty scored); Ro. Funes Mori (penalty scored); Ocampos (penalty scored); Ledesma (penalty scored); Villalva (penalty missed); Vila (penalty missed)		(penalty scored) Saja; (penalty missed) Moreno; (penalty scored) Viola; (penalty scored) Pillud; (penalty scored) Hauche; (penalty scored) Fariña

== Squad statistics ==
=== Appearances and goals ===
As of 24 June 2012

No.	Pos	Nat	Player	Total		Primera B Nacional		Copa Argentina	
No.	Pos	Nat	Player	Apps	Goals	Apps	Goals	Apps	Goals
	GK	(Argentina) ARG	Leandro Chichizola	22	0	18+0	0	4+0	0
	GK	(Argentina) ARG	Daniel Vega	21	0	20+0	0	1+0	0
	DF	(Argentina) ARG	Jonathan Maidana	36	0	36+0	0	0+0	0
	DF	(Argentina) ARG	Agustín Alayes	6	0	6+0	0	0+0	0
	DF	(Uruguay) URU	Juan Manuel Díaz	29	2	27+0	2	2+0	0
	DF	(Argentina) ARG	Luciano Abecasis	21	0	17+0	0	4+0	0
	DF	(Argentina) ARG	Alexis Ferrero	11	0	8+3	0	0+0	0
	DF	(Argentina) ARG	Carlos Arano	8	0	7+0	0	1+0	0
	DF	(Argentina) ARG	Luciano Vella	18	0	16+0	0	2+0	0
	DF	(Paraguay) PAR	Adalberto Román	1	0	1+0	0	0+0	0
	DF	(Argentina) ARG	Leandro González Pirez	13	0	6+3	0	3+1	0
	DF	(Argentina) ARG	Germán Pezzella	6	0	1+0	0	5+0	0
	DF	(Argentina) ARG	Ramiro Funes Mori	21	2	17+1	2	3+0	0
	DF	(Argentina) ARG	Diego Martínez	1	0	0+0	0	1+0	0
	MF	(Uruguay) URU	Carlos Sánchez	35	4	35+0	4	0+0	0
	MF	(Argentina) ARG	Martín Aguirre	33	5	17+12	4	3+1	1
	MF	(Argentina) ARG	Nicolás Domingo	12	0	7+1	0	4+0	0
	MF	(Argentina) ARG	Lucas Ocampos	38	7	31+6	7	0+1	0
	MF	(Argentina) ARG	Alejandro Domínguez	36	5	30+4	4	2+0	1
	MF	(Argentina) ARG	Ezequiel Cirigliano	28	0	26+1	0	1+0	0
	MF	(Ecuador) ECU	Juan Cazares	4	0	0+0	0	0+4	0
	MF	(Argentina) ARG	Mauro Díaz	5	0	1+4	0	0+0	0
	MF	(Argentina) ARG	Cristian Ledesma	7	0	2+1	0	4+0	0
	MF	(Venezuela) VEN	César González	15	2	6+6	2	2+1	0
	MF	(Argentina) ARG	Leonardo Ponzio	20	1	19+0	1	0+1	0
	FW	(Argentina) ARG	Fernando Cavenaghi	38	19	37+0	19	1+0	0
	FW	(Argentina) ARG	Daniel Villalva	17	3	1+12	1	3+1	2
	FW	(Argentina) ARG	Rogelio Funes Mori	27	6	8+14	4	5+0	2
	FW	(Argentina) ARG	Gustavo Bou	6	0	0+6	0	0+0	0
	FW	(Argentina) ARG	Andrés Ríos	17	1	6+8	1	2+1	0
	FW	(France) FRA	David Trezeguet	21	14	13+6	13	2+0	1
	FW	(Argentina) ARG	Luis Alfredo Vila	2	0	0+0	0	0+2	0
Players who appeared for River Plate no longer at the club:
	FW	(Argentina) ARG	Fabián Bordagaray	2	1	0+2	1	0+0	0
	MF	(Argentina) ARG	Facundo Affranchino	7	0	0+6	0	1+0	0

=== Top scorers ===
Place	Position	Nation	Number	Name	Primera B Nacional	Copa Argentina	Total
1	FW	(Argentina)		Fernando Cavenaghi	19	0	19
2	FW	(France)		David Trezeguet	13	1	14
3	MF	(Argentina)		Lucas Ocampos	7	0	7
4	FW	(Argentina)		Rogelio Funes Mori	4	2	6
5	MF	(Argentina)		Martín Aguirre	4	1	5
5	MF	(Argentina)		Alejandro Domínguez	4	1	5
7	MF	(Uruguay)		Carlos Sánchez	4	0	4
8	FW	(Argentina)		Daniel Villalva	1	2	3
9	DF	(Uruguay)		Juan Manuel Díaz	2	0	2
9				Own goal	2	0	2
9	DF	(Argentina)		Ramiro Funes Mori	2	0	2
9	MF	(Venezuela)		César González	2	0	2
13	FW	(Argentina)		Fabián Bordagaray	1	0	1
13	FW	(Argentina)		Andrés Ríos	1	0	1
13	MF	(Argentina)		Leonardo Ponzio	1	0	1
13	FW	(Argentina)		Daniel Villalva	1	0	1
				TOTALS	68	7	75

=== Disciplinary record ===
Number	Nation	Position	Name	Primera B Nacional		Copa Argentina		Total	
Number	Nation	Position	Name	Yellow card	Red card	Yellow card	Red card	Yellow card	Red card
	(Uruguay)	MF	Carlos Sánchez	9	1	0	0	9	1
	(Argentina)	MF	Martín Aguirre	7	0	2	0	9	0
	(Argentina)	MF	Ezequiel Cirigliano	8	0	0	0	8	0
	(Argentina)	MF	Leonardo Ponzio	7	0	0	0	7	0
	(Argentina)	DF	Jonathan Maidana	7	0	0	0	7	0
	(Uruguay)	DF	Juan Manuel Díaz	5	0	0	0	5	0
	(Argentina)	DF	Luciano Vella	5	0	0	0	5	0
	(Argentina)	DF	Luciano Abecasis	4	0	1	0	5	0
	(Argentina)	MF	Alejandro Domínguez	5	0	0	0	5	0
	(Argentina)	DF	Ramiro Funes Mori	3	1	1	0	4	1
	(Argentina)	FW	Fernando Cavenaghi	4	0	0	0	4	0
	(Argentina)	DF	Alexis Ferrero	3	0	0	0	3	0
	(Argentina)	MF	Lucas Ocampos	3	0	0	0	3	0
	(Argentina)	FW	Rogelio Funes Mori	2	0	1	0	3	0
	(Argentina)	DF	Leandro González Pirez	3	0	0	0	3	0
	(France)	FW	David Trezeguet	2	0	0	0	2	0
	(Argentina)	DF	Germán Pezzella	0	0	2	0	2	0
	(Argentina)	MF	Cristian Ledesma	1	0	1	0	2	0
	(Argentina)	DF	Agustín Alayes	1	0	0	0	1	0
	(Argentina)	MF	Nicolás Domingo	1	0	0	0	1	0
	(Argentina)	FW	Andrés Ríos	1	0	0	0	1	0
	(Argentina)	DF	Carlos Arano	1	0	0	0	1	0
	(Argentina)	GK	Daniel Vega	1	0	0	0	1	0
	(Argentina)	FW	Andrés Ríos	0	0	1	0	1	0
	(Argentina)	DF	Diego Martínez	0	0	1	0	1	0
			TOTALS	82	2	9	0	91	2

== Team kit ==
These are the 2011–12 River Plate kits.

Supplier: Adidas
Sponsor(s): Petrobras & Tramontina
