= 2012–13 Club Atlético River Plate season =

River Plate
2012–13 season
- President: (Argentina) Daniel Passarella
- Manager: (Argentina) Matias Almeyda & Ramón Díaz
- Primera División: Inicial: 6th Final: 2nd
- Copa Argentina: Round of 32
- Top goalscorer: League: All: Rodrigo Mora (8)
- Highest home attendance: 67,667
- Lowest home attendance: 50,000
- Biggest win: River 5–0 Godoy Cruz
- Biggest defeat: San Lorenzo 5–1 River
Home colours	Away colours	Third colours

The 2012–13 season was River Plate's first season back in the Primera División, following one season in the Primera B Nacional. Ramón Díaz managed the club.

== Transfers ==
In: Note: Flags indicate national team as defined under FIFA eligibility rules; some limited exceptions apply. Players may hold more than one non-FIFA nationality.

No.	Pos.	Nation	Player
10	MF	ARG	Manuel Lanzini (from Fluminense)
11	FW	URU	Rodrigo Mora (from S.L. Benfica)
15	FW	PAR	Juan Manuel Iturbe (from Cerro Porteño)
16	MF	ARG	Ariel Rojas (from Godoy Cruz)
18	GK	ARG	Marcelo Barovero (from Vélez Sársfield)
21	DF	ARG	Leonel Vangioni (from Newell's Old Boys)
25	DF	ARG	Gabriel Mercado (from Estudiantes LP)
27	DF	ARG	Jonathan Bottinelli (from San Lorenzo)
33	FW	ARG	Carlos Luna (from Club Atletico Tigre)

Out: Note: Flags indicate national team as defined under FIFA eligibility rules; some limited exceptions apply. Players may hold more than one non-FIFA nationality.

No.	Pos.	Nation	Player
—	DF	ARG	Agustín Alayes (to Banfield)
—	DF	URU	Juan Manuel Díaz (to Nacional)
—	DF	ARG	Alexis Ferrero (to Huracán)
—	MF	ARG	Nicolás Domingo (to Banfield)
—	MF	ARG	Alejandro Damián Domínguez (Loan return to (Spain) Valencia)
—	MF	VEN	César González (to (Venezuela) Deportivo Táchira)
—	FW	ARG	Fernando Cavenaghi (to (Spain) Villarreal)
—	FW	ARG	Gustavo Bou (to Gimnasia y Esgrima La Plata)

== Inicial Squad ==
Note: Flags indicate national team as defined under FIFA eligibility rules; some limited exceptions apply. Players may hold more than one non-FIFA nationality.

No.	Pos.	Nation	Player
1	GK	ARG	Daniel Vega
2	DF	ARG	Jonatan Maidana
4	DF	ARG	Luciano Vella
6	DF	ARG	Ramiro Funes Mori
7	FW	FRA	David Trezeguet (Captain)
8	MF	URU	Carlos Sanchez
9	FW	ARG	Rogelio Funes Mori
10	MF	ARG	Manuel Lanzini
11	FW	URU	Rodrigo Mora
12	DF	ARG	Luciano Abecasis
14	MF	ARG	Ezequiel Cirigliano
16	MF	ARG	Ariel Rojas

No.	Pos.	Nation	Player
17	FW	ARG	Daniel Villalva
18	GK	ARG	Marcelo Barovero
19	GK	ARG	Leandro Chichizola
20	DF	ARG	German Pezzella
22	MF	ARG	Martin Aguirre
23	MF	ARG	Leonardo Ponzio (vice-Captain)
24	DF	ARG	Leandro González Pirez
25	DF	ARG	Gabriel Mercado
27	DF	ARG	Jonathan Bottinelli
28	MF	ARG	Cristian Ledesma
33	FW	ARG	Carlos Luna

== Final Squad ==
Note: Flags indicate national team as defined under FIFA eligibility rules; some limited exceptions apply. Players may hold more than one non-FIFA nationality.

No.	Pos.	Nation	Player
1	GK	ARG	Marcelo Barovero
2	DF	ARG	Jonatan Maidana
4	DF	ARG	Luciano Abecasis
6	DF	ARG	Ramiro Funes Mori
7	FW	FRA	David Trezeguet (Captain)
8	MF	URU	Carlos Sanchez
9	FW	ARG	Rogelio Funes Mori
10	MF	ARG	Manuel Lanzini
11	FW	URU	Rodrigo Mora
14	MF	ARG	Ezequiel Cirigliano
15	FW	PAR	Juan Manuel Iturbe
16	MF	ARG	Ariel Rojas
17	GK	ARG	Gonzalo Marinelli

No.	Pos.	Nation	Player
19	GK	ARG	Leandro Chichizola
20	DF	ARG	German Pezzella
21	DF	ARG	Leonel Vangioni
22	MF	ARG	Martin Aguirre
23	MF	ARG	Leonardo Ponzio (vice-Captain)
24	DF	ARG	Leandro González Pirez
25	DF	ARG	Gabriel Mercado
27	DF	ARG	Jonathan Bottinelli
28	MF	ARG	Cristian Ledesma
32	MF	ARG	Matias Kranevitter
33	FW	ARG	Carlos Luna
39	MF	COL	Eder Alvarez Balanta

=== On Loan ===
Note: Flags indicate national team as defined under FIFA eligibility rules; some limited exceptions apply. Players may hold more than one non-FIFA nationality.

No.	Pos.	Nation	Player
-	DF	ARG	Maximiliano Oliva (at Independiente Rivadavia)
-	DF	ARG	Maximiliano Coronel (at All Boys)
-	DF	ARG	Alejandro Espinoza (at Atlético Tucumán)
-	DF	PAR	Adalberto Román (at Palmeiras)
-	MF	ARG	Fabio Gimenez (at Guillermo Brown)

No.	Pos.	Nation	Player
-	MF	ARG	Walter Acevedo (at Banfield)
-	MF	ARG	Mauro Díaz (at Unión Española)
-	FW	ARG	Gonzalo Abán (at Ferro)
-	FW	ARG	Ezequiel Conte (at Guillermo Brown)
-	FW	ARG	Gustavo Fernández (at Deportivo Saprissa)

== Competitions ==
=== 2012 Torneo Inicial ===
==== Results summary ====
Overall								Home						Away					
Pld	W	D	L	GF	GA	GD	Pts	W	D	L	GF	GA	GD	W	D	L	GF	GA	GD
19	7	8	4	28	16	+12	29	3	4	2	14	8	+6	4	4	2	14	8	+6

Last updated: 2 December 2012.
Source: Soccerway

==== Results by round ====
Round	1	2	3	4	5	6	7	8	9	10	11	12	13	14	15	16	17	18	19
Ground	H	A	A	H	A	H	A	H	A	H	A	H	A	H	A	H	A	H	A
Result	L	W	W	D	D	D	L	L	W	W	L	D	D	W	D	D	D	W	W
Position	15	9	4	8	9	9	9	9	10	8	9	9	9	7	7	9	9	9	8

Source: Soccerway
A = Away; H = Home; W = Win; D = Draw; L = Loss

==== Fixtures and results ====
5 August 2012 1	River Plate	1 – 2	Belgrano	Buenos Aires
	Lanzini 75'	Summary	Melano 44'; Carranza 46'; Olave (yellow card) 89' (red card) 89'	Stadium: Estadio Monumental Antonio Vespucio Liberti

11 August 2012 2	Estudiantes	0 – 2	River Plate	La Plata
		Summary	Rog. Funes Mori 54', 67'	Stadium: Estadio Único de La Plata

18 August 2012 3	Tigre	2 - 3	River Plate	Victoria, Buenos Aires
	Orban 20'; Ftacla 60'	Summary	Villalva 11'; Sánchez 16'; Lanzini 46'	Stadium: Estadio Coliseo de Victoria; Referee: Saul Laverni

25 August 2012 4	River Plate	0 - 0	San Lorenzo	Buenos Aires
		Summary		Stadium: Estadio Monumental Antonio Vespucio Liberti

3 September 2012 5	Colón	1 - 1	River Plate	Santa Fe
	Ramírez 70'	Summary	Pezzella 89'	Stadium: Estadio Brigadier General Estanislao López

10 September 2012 6	River Plate	3 - 3	Newell's Old Boys	Buenos Aires
	Trezeguet 20'; Mora 23'; Rog. Funes Mori 67'	Summary	Pérez 12'; Scocco 70' (pen.), 73'	Stadium: Estadio Monumental Antonio Vespucio Liberti; Referee: Mauro Vigliano

17 September 2012 7	Vélez Sársfield	2 - 0	River Plate	Liniers, Buenos Aires
	Pratto 20'; Bella 64'; Papa (yellow card) 21' (yellow-red card) 69'	Summary	Ram. Funes Mori (yellow card) 50' (yellow-red card) 61'	Stadium: Estadio José Amalfitani; Referee: Patricio Loustau

23 September 2012 8	River Plate	0 - 1	Racing Club	Buenos Aires
		Summary	Cahais 70'	Stadium: Estadio Monumental Antonio Vespucio Liberti; Referee: Pablo Lunati

30 September 2012 9	Arsenal	0 - 4	River Plate	Sarandí
	Carbonero (red card) 76'	Summary	Ponzio 41'; Luna 70'; Rog. Funes Mori 81', 90+1'	Stadium: Estadio Julio H. Grondona; Referee: Nestor Pitana

7 October 2012 10	River Plate	5 - 0	Godoy Cruz	Buenos Aires
	Aguirre 9'; Ponzio 12'; Sánchez 62', 76'; Mora 64'	Summary		Stadium: Estadio Monumental Antonio Vespucio Liberti; Referee: Diego Ceballos

20 October 2012 11	Quilmes	1 - 0	River Plate	Quilmes
	Cauteruccio 60'	Summary		Stadium: Estadio Centenario Dr. José Luis Meiszner; Referee: Silvio Trucco

28 October 2012 12	River Plate	2 - 2	Boca Juniors	Buenos Aires
	Ponzio 2'; Mora 70'	Summary	Silva 76' (pen.); Erviti 90+1'	Stadium: Estadio Monumental Antonio Vespucio Liberti; Referee: Pablo Lunati

4 November 2012 13	All Boys	0 - 0	River Plate	Floresta, Buenos Aires
		Summary	Ponzio (red card) 90+3'	Stadium: Islas Malvinas Stadium; Referee: Federico Beligoy

10 November 2012 14	River Plate	2 - 0	Unión de Santa Fe	Buenos Aires
18:15	Mora 45', 70'; Ledesma (yellow card) 65' (yellow-red card)	Summary		Stadium: Estadio Monumental Antonio Vespucio Liberti; Referee: Néstor Pitana

14 November 2012 15	Atlético de Rafaela	0 - 0	River Plate	Rafaela
21:30		Summary		Stadium: Estadio Nuevo Monumental; Referee: Germán Delfino

19 November 2012 16	River Plate	0 - 0	Argentinos Juniors	Buenos Aires
21:30		Summary		Stadium: Estadio Monumental Antonio Vespucio Liberti; Referee: Pablo Lunati

24 November 2012 17	Independiente	2 - 2	River Plate	Avellaneda
17:00	Fredes 4'; Galeano 71'	Summary	Bottinelli 22'; Sánchez 61'	Stadium: Estadio Libertadores de América; Referee: Nestor Pittana

2 December 2012 18	River Plate	1 - 0	Lanús	Buenos Aires
17:00	Mora 77'	Summary	Pizarro (red card) 90+2'	Stadium: Estadio Monumental Antonio Vespucio Liberti; Referee: German Delfino

9 December 2012 19	San Martín de San Juan	0 - 2	River Plate	San Juan, Argentina
17:00		[ Summary]	Lanzini 58'; Sánchez 63'	Stadium: Estadio San Juan del Bicentenario; Referee: Juan Pablo Pompei

==== League table ====
Pos	Team	Pld	W	D	L	GF	GA	GD	Pts
6	Boca Juniors	19	9	6	4	25	20	+5	33
7	Arsenal	19	9	4	6	19	22	−3	31
8	River Plate	19	7	8	4	28	16	+12	29
9	Estudiantes (LP)	19	8	4	7	19	16	+3	28
10	Colón	19	6	8	5	26	24	+2	26

=== 2013 Torneo Final ===
==== Results summary ====
Overall								Home						Away					
Pld	W	D	L	GF	GA	GD	Pts	W	D	L	GF	GA	GD	W	D	L	GF	GA	GD
19	10	5	4	28	22	+6	35	7	3	0	18	7	+11	3	2	4	10	15	−5

Source: Soccerway

==== Results by round ====
Round	1	2	3	4	5	6	7	8	9	10	11	12	13	14	15	16	17	18	19
Ground	A	H	H	A	H	A	H	A	H	A	H	A	H	A	H	A	H	A	H
Result	W	W	W	L	W	L	D	W	D	W	D	D	W	D	W	L	W	L	W
Position	6	2	2	2	2	3	4	3	3	3	3	3	3	3	2	3	2	3	2

Source: Soccerway
A = Away; H = Home; W = Win; D = Draw; L = Loss

==== Fixtures and results ====
10 February 2013 1	Belgrano	1 – 2	River Plate	Córdoba
	Farré 90'	Summary	Vangioni 68'; Luna 88'	Stadium: Estadio Julio César Villagra; Referee: Germán Delfino

17 February 2013 2	River Plate	1 – 0	Estudiantes	Buenos Aires
	Trezeguet 32'	Summary		Stadium: Estadio Monumental Antonio Vespucio Liberti; Referee: Diego Abal

24 February 2013 3	River Plate	3 – 2	Tigre	Buenos Aires
	Luna 86', 87'; Iturbe 90+3'	Summary	Donatti 55'; Pérez García 90+6' (pen.)	Stadium: Estadio Monumental Antonio Vespucio Liberti; Referee: Pablo Lunati

3 March 2013 4	San Lorenzo	2 – 0	River Plate	Buenos Aires
	Stracqualursi 1'; Cetto 20'	Summary		Stadium: Estadio Pedro Bidegain; Referee: Germán Delfino

10 March 2013 5	River Plate	2 – 1	Colón	Buenos Aires
	Trezeguet 12'; Ponzio 34'	Summary	Gigliotti 75'	Stadium: Estadio Monumental Antonio Vespucio Liberti; Referee: Diego Abal

17 March 2013 6	Newell's Old Boys	1 – 0	River Plate	Rosario
	Scocco 36'	Summary		Stadium: Estadio Marcelo Bielsa; Referee: Diego Ceballos

30 March 2013 7	River Plate	0 – 0	Vélez Sársfield	Buenos Aires
		Summary		Stadium: Estadio Monumental Antonio Vespucio Liberti; Referee: Mauro Vigliano

7 April 2013 8	Racing Club	0 – 2	River Plate	Avellaneda
		Summary	González Pírez 12'; Lanzini 89'	Stadium: Estadio Presidente Juan Domingo Perón; Referee: Pablo Díaz

14 April 2013 9	River Plate	1 – 1	Arsenal	Buenos Aires
	Benedetto 14'	Summary	Rog. Funes Mori 19'	Stadium: Estadio Monumental Antonio Vespucio Liberti; Referee: Fernando Rapallini

21 April 2013 10	Godoy Cruz	1 – 2	River Plate	Mendoza
	Castillón 35'	Summary	Lanzini 32' (pen.); Álvarez Balanta 54'	Stadium: Estadio Malvinas Argentinas; Referee: Néstor Pitana

28 April 2013 11	River Plate	1 – 1	Quilmes	Buenos Aires
	Álvarez Balanta 54'	Summary	Cauteruccio 89'	Stadium: Estadio Monumental Antonio Vespucio Liberti; Referee: Carlos Maglio

5 May 2013 12	Boca Juniors	1 – 1	River Plate	Buenos Aires
	Silva 39'	Summary	Lanzini 1'	Stadium: Estadio Alberto J. Armando; Referee: Germán Delfino

12 May 2013 13	River Plate	2 – 0	All Boys	Buenos Aires
	Lanzini 50'; Luna 90+3'	Summary		Stadium: Estadio Monumental Antonio Vespucio Liberti; Referee: Néstor Pitana

19 May 2013 14	Unión de Santa Fe	2 – 2	River Plate	Santa Fe
	Franzoia 26'; Cavallaro 35'	Summary	Rog. Funes Mori 36'; Mora 84'	Stadium: Estadio 15 de Abril; Referee: Diego Ceballos

26 May 2013 15	River Plate	3 – 0	Atlético de Rafaela	Buenos Aires
	Vangioni 8'; Domínguez 14' (o.g.); Luna 32'	Summary		Stadium: Estadio Monumental Antonio Vespucio Liberti; Referee: Pablo Díaz

2 June 2013 16	Argentinos Juniors	2 – 0	River Plate	Buenos Aires
	Barraza 81'; Gómez 87'	Summary		Stadium: Estadio Diego Armando Maradona; Referee: Néstor Pitana

9 June 2013 17	River Plate	2 – 1	Independiente	Buenos Aires
	Iturbe 21'; Lanzini 63'	Summary	Montenegro 90'	Stadium: Estadio Monumental Antonio Vespucio Liberti; Referee: Saúl Laverni

16 June 2013 18	Lanús	5 – 1	River Plate	Lanús
	Chávez 4'; Pizarro 12'; Ayala 14'; Blanco 28', 50'	Summary	Vangioni 7'	Stadium: Estadio Ciudad de Lanús – Néstor Díaz Pérez; Referee: Mauro Vigliano

23 June 2013 19	River Plate	3 – 1	San Martín de San Juan	Buenos Aires
	Vangioni 13'; Sánchez 24'; Iturbe 88'	Summary	Caprari 43'	Stadium: Estadio Monumental Antonio Vespucio Liberti; Referee: Germán Delfino

==== League table ====
Pos	Team	Pld	W	D	L	GF	GA	GD	Pts	Qualification
1	Newell's Old Boys (C)	19	12	2	5	40	21	+19	38	2014 Copa Libertadores Second Stage
2	River Plate	19	10	5	4	28	22	+6	35	
3	Lanús	19	8	9	2	26	14	+12	33	
4	San Lorenzo	19	8	8	3	26	16	+10	32	
5	Quilmes	19	8	7	4	28	22	+6	31	

(C) Champions

=== Copa Argentina ===
24 April 2013 Last 32	River Plate	0 - 1	Estudiantes de Buenos Aires	Estadio Bicentenario Ciudad de Catamarca
21:30	Cirigliano (yellow card) 33'; Esteban Espíndola López (yellow card) 57'; Augusto Solari (yellow card) 57'; Mora (yellow card) 90'	Summary	Juan Manuel Sosa (yellow card) 16'; Pablo Ruiz 35'; Nicolás Álvarez (yellow card) 63'; Gastón Montero (yellow card) 70'	Referee: (Argentina) Darío Herrera

== Squad statistics ==
=== Appearances and goals ===
As of 5 November 2012

No.	Pos	Nat	Player	Total		Primera División		Copa Argentina	
No.	Pos	Nat	Player	Apps	Goals	Apps	Goals	Apps	Goals
1	GK	(Argentina) ARG	Daniel Vega	1	0	1+0	0	0+0	0
2	DF	(Argentina) ARG	Jonathan Maidana	8	0	8+0	0	0+0	0
4	DF	(Argentina) ARG	Luciano Vella	1	0	1+0	0	0+0	0
6	DF	(Argentina) ARG	Ramiro Funes Mori	10	0	10+0	0	0+0	0
7	FW	(France) FRA	David Trezeguet	9	1	9+0	1	0+0	0
8	MF	(Uruguay) URU	Carlos Sánchez	12	3	12+0	3	0+0	0
9	FW	(Argentina) ARG	Rogelio Funes Mori	13	5	9+4	5	0+0	0
10	MF	(Argentina) ARG	Manuel Lanzini	8	2	5+3	2	0+0	0
11	FW	(Uruguay) URU	Rodrigo Mora	8	2	7+1	2	0+0	0
12	DF	(Argentina) ARG	Luciano Abecasis	1	0	1+0	0	0+0	0
14	MF	(Argentina) ARG	Ezequiel Cirigliano	10	0	10+0	0	0+0	0
15	MF	(Argentina) ARG	Facundo Affranchino	2	0	0+2	0	0+0	0
16	MF	(Argentina) ARG	Ariel Rojas	10	0	4+6	0	0+0	0
17	FW	(Argentina) ARG	Daniel Villalva	5	1	1+4	1	0+0	0
18	GK	(Argentina) ARG	Marcelo Barovero	12	0	12+0	0	0+0	0
20	DF	(Argentina) ARG	Germán Pezzella	8	1	7+1	1	0+0	0
22	MF	(Argentina) ARG	Martín Aguirre	9	1	4+5	1	0+0	0
23	MF	(Argentina) ARG	Leonardo Ponzio	12	3	12+0	3	0+0	0
24	DF	(Argentina) ARG	Leandro González Pirez	8	0	7+1	0	0+0	0
25	DF	(Argentina) ARG	Gabriel Mercado	8	0	8+0	0	0+0	0
27	DF	(Argentina) ARG	Jonathan Bottinelli	8	0	8+0	0	0+0	0
28	MF	(Argentina) ARG	Cristian Ledesma	2	0	1+1	0	0+0	0
30	DF	(Argentina) ARG	Diego Martínez	2	0	2+0	0	0+0	0
33	FW	(Argentina) ARG	Carlos Luna	5	1	2+3	1	0+0	0
36	MF	(Ecuador) ECU	Juan Cazares	2	0	1+1	0	0+0	0
Players who appeared for River Plate no longer at the club:
11	MF	(Argentina) ARG	Lucas Ocampos	1	0	1+0	0	0+0	0

=== Top scorers ===
Place	Position	Nation	Number	Name	Primera División	Copa Argentina	Total
1	FW	(Argentina)	9	Rogelio Funes Mori	5	0	5
2	MF	(Uruguay)	8	Carlos Sánchez	3	0	3
2	FW	(Uruguay)	11	Rodrigo Mora	3	0	3
2	MF	(Argentina)	23	Leonardo Ponzio	3	0	3
5	MF	(Argentina)	10	Manuel Lanzini	2	0	2
6	FW	(Argentina)	17	Daniel Villalva	1	0	1
6	DF	(Argentina)	20	Germán Pezzella	1	0	1
6	FW	(France)	7	David Trezeguet	1	0	1
6	FW	(Argentina)	33	Carlos Luna	1	0	1
6	MF	(Argentina)	22	Martín Aguirre	1	0	1
				TOTALS	21	0	21

=== Disciplinary record ===
Number	Nation	Position	Name	Primera División		Copa Argentina		Total	
Number	Nation	Position	Name	Yellow card	Red card	Yellow card	Red card	Yellow card	Red card
2	(Argentina)	DF	Jonathan Maidana	2	0	0	0	2	0
6	(Argentina)	DF	Ramiro Funes Mori	5	1	0	0	5	1
8	(Uruguay)	MF	Carlos Sánchez	2	0	0	0	2	0
9	(Argentina)	FW	Rogelio Funes Mori	3	0	0	0	3	0
10	(Argentina)	MF	Manuel Lanzini	1	0	0	0	1	0
11	(Uruguay)	FW	Rodrigo Mora	1	0	0	0	1	0
14	(Argentina)	MF	Ezequiel Cirigliano	1	0	0	0	1	0
15	(Argentina)	MF	Facundo Affranchino	1	0	0	0	1	0
16	(Argentina)	MF	Ariel Rojas	3	0	0	0	3	0
22	(Argentina)	MF	Martín Aguirre	4	0	0	0	4	0
23	(Argentina)	MF	Leonardo Ponzio	6	1	0	0	6	1
24	(Argentina)	DF	Leandro González Pirez	3	0	0	0	3	0
25	(Argentina)	DF	Gabriel Mercado	2	0	0	0	2	0
27	(Argentina)	DF	Jonathan Bottinelli	3	0	0	0	3	0
30	(Argentina)	DF	Diego Martínez	1	0	0	0	1	0
33	(Argentina)	FW	Carlos Luna	2	0	0	0	2	0
			TOTALS	41	2	0	0	41	2

== Team kit ==
These are the 2012–13 River Plate kits.

Supplier: Adidas
Sponsor(s): BBVA & Tramontina
