= Funes Mori =

Funes Mori is a surname. Notable people with the surname include:

- Ramiro Funes Mori (born 1991), Argentine footballer, twin brother of Rogelio
- Rogelio Funes Mori (born 1991), Argentine-born footballer who plays for Mexico
