= Caprari =

Caprari is an Italian surname. Notable people with the surname include:

- Gastón Caprari (born 1985), Argentine footballer
- Gianluca Caprari (born 1993), Italian footballer
- Sergio Caprari (1932–2015), Italian boxer
