= Ramiro Funes Mori =

Argentine footballer (born 1991)

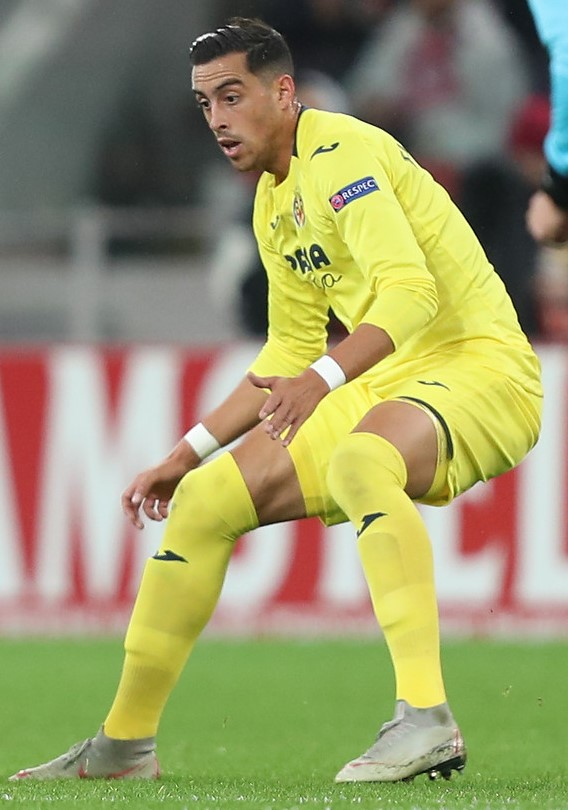
- Funes Mori with Villarreal in 2018

Personal information
- Full name: José Ramiro Funes Mori
- Date of birth: 5 March 1991 (age 35)
- Place of birth: Mendoza, Argentina
- Height: 1.86 m (6 ft 1 in)
- Positions: Centre-back; left-back; defensive midfielder

Team information
- Current team: Estudiantes
- Number: 26

Youth career
- 2008: FC Dallas
- 2008–2011: River Plate

Senior career*
Years	Team	Apps	(Gls)
2011–2015	River Plate	76	(7)
2015–2018	Everton	55	(4)
2018–2021	Villarreal	48	(2)
2021–2022	Al-Nassr	21	(0)
2022–2023	Cruz Azul	24	(1)
2023–2025	River Plate	17	(0)
2025–	Estudiantes	16	(0)

International career^{‡}
2015–2019	Argentina	26	(2)
Medal record
Men's football
Representing Argentina
Copa América
Runner-up	2016 United States
Third place	2019 Brazil
- * Club domestic league appearances and goals as of 16:44, 26 June 2026 (UTC) ‡ National team caps and goals as of 16 November 2026 (UTC)

José Ramiro Funes Mori (Spanish pronunciation: [xoˈse raˈmiɾo ˈfunes ˈmoɾi]; born 5 March 1991) is an Argentine professional footballer who plays as a defender for Argentine Primera División club Estudiantes. He plays primarily as a centre-back but can also operate as a left-back and defensive midfielder.

== Early life ==
Funes Mori was born in Mendoza. He emigrated with his family from Argentina to the United States in 2001. His father, Miguel, played professional football in Argentina with clubs such as Independiente Rivadavia and Club Atlético Argentino in the 1980s. In 2008, Funes Mori joined the FC Dallas youth team after his twin brother Rogelio Gabriel won the Sueño MLS talent competition, but spent less than a year playing for the side before moving back to Argentina.

== Club career ==
=== River Plate ===
Funes Mori joined River Plate as a youth player, progressing to the senior team in 2011. He is considered a legend of the club because he won six professional titles, four of them international, including the 2015 Copa Libertadores. He made his debut for the Argentina national team whilst playing for River Plate. Funes Mori is remembered not only for his performances and titles, but also for scoring very important goals such as the third goal in the Copa Libertadores final and an iconic goal against Boca Juniors. He made a total of 108 appearances for River Plate across five seasons, scoring ten goals.

=== Everton ===
On 1 September 2015, Funes Mori joined Premier League club Everton for a fee of £9.5 million. He made his debut eleven days later, coming on as a substitute, in a 3–1 home win against Chelsea. He scored his first goal for Everton in a 3–3 draw with Bournemouth in November 2015. In his first season with the club, he received significant playing time at centre back due to injuries and lack of form for the expected starting pair of Phil Jagielka and John Stones. In April 2016, Funes Mori was sent off for a tackle on Divock Origi in a 4–0 loss to Liverpool, leading to a three-match suspension. He scored five goals across all competitions in his first season with the club.

Funes Mori was out for the remainder of the 2016–17 season after suffering a torn meniscus while on international duty with Argentina in March 2017. In the summer of 2017, Funes Mori had undergone a second operation on his knee injury in Barcelona and was looking at between six and nine months on the sidelines.

=== Villarreal ===
On 21 June 2018, Funes Mori joined La Liga club Villarreal for an undisclosed fee.

=== Al Nassr ===
On 22 July 2021, Funes Mori signed two-year contract with Saudi Pro League club Al Nassr for a fee of €2.5 million.

=== Cruz Azul ===
Funes Mori signed a two-year contract with Mexican club Cruz Azul on 4 August 2022, for a transfer fee of €1.5 million. His contract with the club expired on 17 May 2023, and he left.

=== River Plate ===
On 18 July 2023, he returned to Argentine Club River Plate on a free transfer after an eight-year absence.

=== Estudiantes ===
After limited appearances in his second season at River Plate, Funes Mori joined Estudiantes, signing a one-year contract.

== International career ==
Funes Mori made his international debut for Argentina in an international friendly against El Salvador in March 2015.

He was selected for his national squad at the Copa América Centenario and was part of the Argentine side that reached the final. The defender played in the final where Chile won 4–2 on penalties after the match finished in a goalless draw. He was not selected among the four penalty takers for Argentine. Funes Mori scored his first international goal on 6 October 2016 in a 2–2 draw against Peru, in a match where he also conceded a late penalty.

In May 2018, he was named in Argentina's preliminary 35-man squad for the 2018 World Cup in Russia, but did not make the final 23.

== Personal life ==
Funes Mori is married to Rocío, the sister of former FC Dallas midfielder Mauro Díaz. His twin brother, Rogelio, is also a footballer and plays for Liga MX club UNAM and the Mexico national team as a striker.

== Career statistics ==
=== Club ===
As of match played 1 March 2025

Appearances and goals by club, season and competition
Club	Season	League			National cup		League cup		Continental		Other		Total	
Club	Season	Division	Apps	Goals	Apps	Goals	Apps	Goals	Apps	Goals	Apps	Goals	Apps	Goals
River Plate	2011–12	Primera B Nacional	19	2	2	0	—		0	0	—		21	2
River Plate	2012–13	Argentine Primera División	10	0	0	0	—		0	0	—		10	0
River Plate	2013–14	Argentine Primera División	19	1	2	0	—		1 (Note: Appearance(s) in Copa Sudamericana)	0	—		22	1
River Plate	2014	Argentine Primera División	17	2	1	1	—		10	1	1 (Note: Appearance(s) in Supercopa Argentina)	0	29	4
River Plate	2015	Argentine Primera División	11	2	0	0	—		12 (Note: Appearance(s) in Copa Libertadores)	1	3 (Note: Two appearances in Recopa Sudamericana, one appearance in Suruga Bank Championship)	0	26	3
River Plate	Total		76	7	5	1	—		23	2	4	0	108	10
Everton	2015–16	Premier League	28	4	4	0	5	1	—		—		37	5
Everton	2016–17	Premier League	23	0	1	0	2	0	—		—		26	0
Everton	2017–18	Premier League	4	0	0	0	0	0	0	0	—		4	0
Everton	Total		55	4	5	0	7	1	0	0	0	0	67	5
Villarreal	2018–19	La Liga	31	2	1	0	—		10 (Note: Appearances in UEFA Europa League)	0	—		42	2
Villarreal	2019–20	La Liga	7	0	5	1	—		—		—		12	1
Villarreal	2020–21	La Liga	10	0	4	0	—		6	0	—		20	0
Villarreal	Total		48	2	10	1	—		16	0	0	0	74	3
Al Nassr	2021–22	Saudi Pro League	21	0	2	0	—		—		—		23	0
Cruz Azul	2022–23	Liga MX	25	1	0	0	—		—		—		25	1
River Plate	2023	Argentine Primera División	11	0	0	0	—		0	0	1	0	12	0
River Plate	2024	Argentine Primera División	6	0	1	0	—		0	0	—		7	0
River Plate	Total		17	0	1	0	—		0	0	1	0	19	0
Estudiantes	2025	Argentine Primera División	8	0	0	0	—		1	0	—		9	0
Career total			250	14	23	2	7	1	40	2	5	0	325	19

=== International ===
As of match played 20 November 2018

Appearances and goals by national team and year
National team	Year	Apps	Goals
Argentina	2015	5	0
Argentina	2016	13	1
Argentina	2017	1	0
Argentina	2018	5	1
Total		24	2

As of match played 16 November 2018

Argentina score listed first, score column indicates score after each Funes Mori goal.

International goals by date, venue, cap, opponent, score, result and competition
Goal	Date	Venue	Cap	Opponent	Score	Result	Competition
1	6 October 2016	Estadio Nacional, Lima, Peru	16	Peru	1–0	2–2	2018 FIFA World Cup qualification
2	16 November 2018	Estadio Mario Alberto Kempes, Cordoba, Argentina	23	Mexico	1–0	2–0	Friendly

== Honours ==
River Plate

- Primera B Nacional: 2011–12
- Argentina Primera Division: 2014 Final
- Copa Campeonato: 2013–14
- Copa Sudamericana: 2014
- Recopa Sudamericana: 2015
- Suruga Bank Championship: 2015
- Copa Libertadores: 2015
- Trofeo de Campeones: 2023
- Supercopa Argentina: 2023

Villarreal

- UEFA Europa League: 2020–21

Estudiantes

- Primera División: 2025 Clausura
- Trofeo de Campeones de la Liga Profesional: 2025

Argentina

- Copa América runner-up: 2016
