= Lucas Ocampos =

Argentine footballer (born 1994)

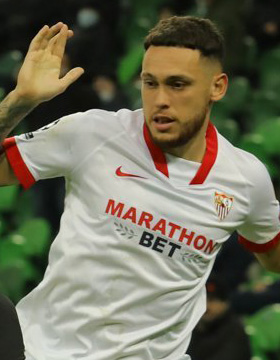
- Ocampos with Sevilla in 2020

Personal information
- Full name: Lucas Ariel Ocampos
- Date of birth: 11 July 1994 (age 32)
- Place of birth: Quilmes, Buenos Aires, Argentina
- Height: 1.88 m (6 ft 2 in)
- Positions: Winger; forward

Team information
- Current team: Monterrey
- Number: 7

Youth career
- 2000–2009: Quilmes
- 2009–2011: River Plate

Senior career*
Years	Team	Apps	(Gls)
2011–2012	River Plate	39	(7)
2012–2015	Monaco	80	(10)
2015	→ Marseille (loan)	14	(2)
2015–2019	Marseille	82	(14)
2016–2017	→ Genoa (loan)	14	(3)
2017	→ AC Milan (loan)	12	(0)
2019–2024	Sevilla	153	(33)
2022–2023	→ Ajax (loan)	4	(0)
2024–	Monterrey	69	(16)

International career^{‡}
2009	Argentina U15	4	(2)
2011	Argentina U17	12	(3)
2019–2023	Argentina	12	(2)
- * Club domestic league appearances and goals as of 05:45, 17 November 2026 (UTC) ‡ National team caps and goals as of 12 October 2023

Lucas Ariel Ocampos (Spanish pronunciation: [ˈlukas aˈɾjel oˈkampos]; born 11 July 1994) is an Argentine professional footballer who plays as a winger or forward for Liga MX club Monterrey.

Ocampos began his senior career in Argentina with River Plate before joining Monaco for a Ligue 2 record fee of €11 million in 2012. He spent two-and-a-half seasons in the principality and was nominated for the European Golden Boy award before joining Marseille. There, he spent four seasons, either side of loan spells in Italy with Genoa and Milan, before joining Sevilla in 2019, where he won two UEFA Europa League titles. Following a brief loan stint with Ajax, Ocampos joined Mexican side Monterrey in 2024. He has represented the Argentina national team, making 12 appearances between 2019 and 2023.

== Club career ==
=== Early career ===
Ocampos started playing football at the academy of Quilmes at the age of six where he first played as a striker. It was with Quilmes that Ocampos was spotted by River Plate. In a youth match against the Buenos Aires-based club Ocampos scored twice, prompting the management at River to follow his progression. They completed his signing after the U15 Sudamericano in which Ocampos excelled for Argentina, signing him on a 50% co-ownership deal with Quilmes.

=== River Plate ===
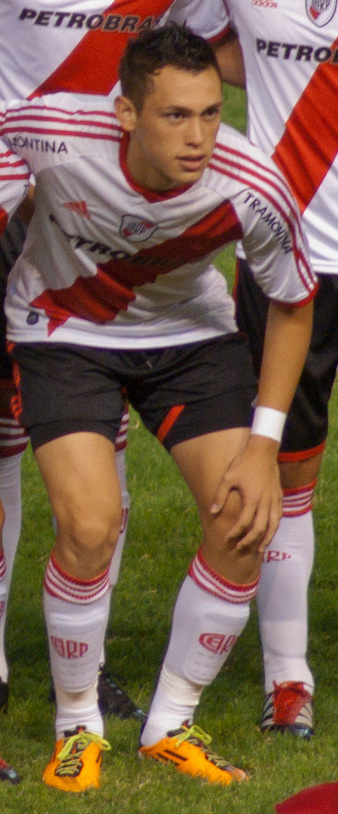
Ocampos during his time with River Plate in Argentina.

Ocampos' first opportunity with River Plate's senior side came in 2011 following the club's relegation to the Nacional B for the first time in their history. He was awarded his first-team debut by manager Matías Almeyda on 16 August 2011, aged 17, against Chacarita Juniors and scored his first goal for the club in the following match, netting River's opener in a 3–1 win over Independiente Rivadavia. Ocampos and Almeyda's paths had previously crossed at Quilmes where Almeyda had been a player at the time of the Ocampos' arrival at the academy. Ocampos soon established himself as a regular in the starting eleven and was instrumental in River securing the club's promotion back to the Primera División, ending the season with 7 goals to his name in 38 appearances. His form throughout the season had also seen him named by FIFA as one of the Players to Watch in 2012. He made his Primera División debut on the opening day of the following season against Belgrano. It would be his final appearance for the club, however, as on 6 August 2012 he completed a transfer to French club Monaco.

=== Monaco ===
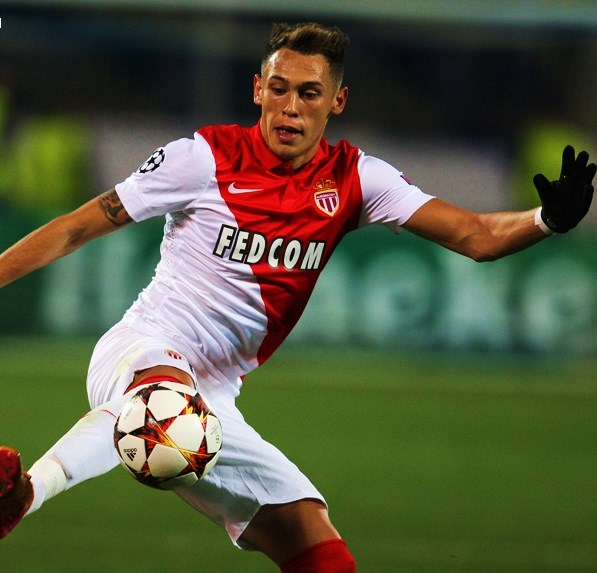
Ocampos playing for Monaco in 2014

On 6 August 2012, Ligue 2 side AS Monaco, owned by Russian billionaire Dmitry Rybolovlev and managed by Claudio Ranieri, completed the signing of Ocampos for a reported fee of €11 million, with the fee split between Quilmes, River and a group of investors. The completion of the deal saw Ocampos become the most expensive Ligue 2 signing of all time. He made his debut for the club on 31 August 2012, coming on as a second-half substitute for Emir Bajrami in a 2–1 loss against Le Havre. Ocampos then scored his first goal for the club in his second appearance in the third round of the Coupe de la Ligue as Monaco beat Valenciennes 4–2. The goal, a spectacular bicycle kick in extra-time, was later chosen by Monaco supporters as the club's Goal of the Season. His first league goal for the club came on 18 January 2013 when he scored one and recorded an assist for Gary Kagelmacher in a 2–0 win over Istres. Ocampos ultimately featured in 29 appearances across the league campaign, scoring four goals as Monaco secured their return to Ligue 1.

Monaco's promotion to Ligue 1 was accompanied by a spate of free-spending by Rybolovlev. The Russian owner completed the big-money signings of James Rodríguez, Radamel Falcao and João Moutinho, amongst others, with the effect that Ocampos found his influence within the Monaco squad diminishing. Despite featuring more from the bench than from the start, Ocampos still managed a return of 5 goals in 34 appearances as Monaco ended the season as runners-up to mega-money rivals PSG. Monaco's failure to secure the league title despite heavy investment saw Ranieri sacked at the end of the season and replaced by Leonardo Jardim. Despite seeing his game time reduced further under Jardim, Ocampos was nominated for the European Golden Boy award in October 2014, though the award was eventually won by Liverpool's Raheem Sterling. On 26 November, Ocampos scored his first Champions League goal in a 1–0 away win against Bayer Leverkusen. Having started only seven matches by the end of January 2015, Ocampos requested a move away from the principality and was granted his wish with a transfer to Ligue 1 rivals Marseille.

=== Marseille ===
On 3 February 2015, Ocampos signed for Monaco's Ligue 1 rivals Marseille on loan until the end of the season, where he paired up with compatriot and manager, Marcelo Bielsa. He made a goal scoring debut for the club four days later, netting in a 1–1 draw with Rennes. He ultimately made fourteen appearances and scored twice during his loan spell as Marseille ended the season in fourth. On 30 June 2015, Marseille announced that Ocampos had signed for the club on a permanent deal for a fee believed to be around €7 million. He scored his first goal of the season in a 6–0 victory over Troyes on 23 August. The goal, another bicycle kick from a Romain Alessandrini cross, was later nominated for the Ligue 1 Goal of the Season award, which was ultimately won by Pierrick Capelle of Angers It was his only contribution in front of goal, however, as after the resignation of Bielsa early in the campaign Ocampos struggled to impress under new manager Míchel, and made only 17 appearances throughout the league season.

==== Loans to Genoa and Milan ====
On 29 June 2016, Serie A side Genoa announced the signing of Ocampos on a season-long loan, with an option to purchase included. He made his debut for the club on 12 August, coming on as a second-half substitute in a 3–2 Coppa Italia win over Lecce, and made his Serie A debut on 21 August in a 3–1 win over newly promoted Cagliari. In September, Ocampos injured ligaments in his knee which saw him ruled him out of action for a month. He made his return on 6 November and scored his first goal for Genoa in a 1–1 draw with Udinese. He scored his second goal the following week in a 3–1 loss to Lazio before scoring his third and final goal for the club on 22 January 2017, netting Genoa's second in a 2–2 draw with Crotone. Towards the end of January, Genoa and Marseille reached an agreement to allow Ocampos to join fellow Serie A side A.C. Milan for the remainder of his loan spell for a reported fee of €500k.

On 30 January 2017, Milan confirmed the loan signing of Ocampos for the remainder of the season, with Genoa retaining the option to buy from Marseille at the end of the loan spell. He was signed as a replacement for Frenchman M'Baye Niang who had moved on loan to Premier League side Watford. Ocampos made his debut for the club on 5 February, coming on as a late second-half substitute for Andrea Bertolacci in a 1–0 defeat to Sampdoria. He featured sporadically for the club, however, and at the end of the season returned to Marseille having played a combined 29 matches and scored 3 goals across all competitions during his stints with Genoa and Milan.

==== Return to Marseille ====
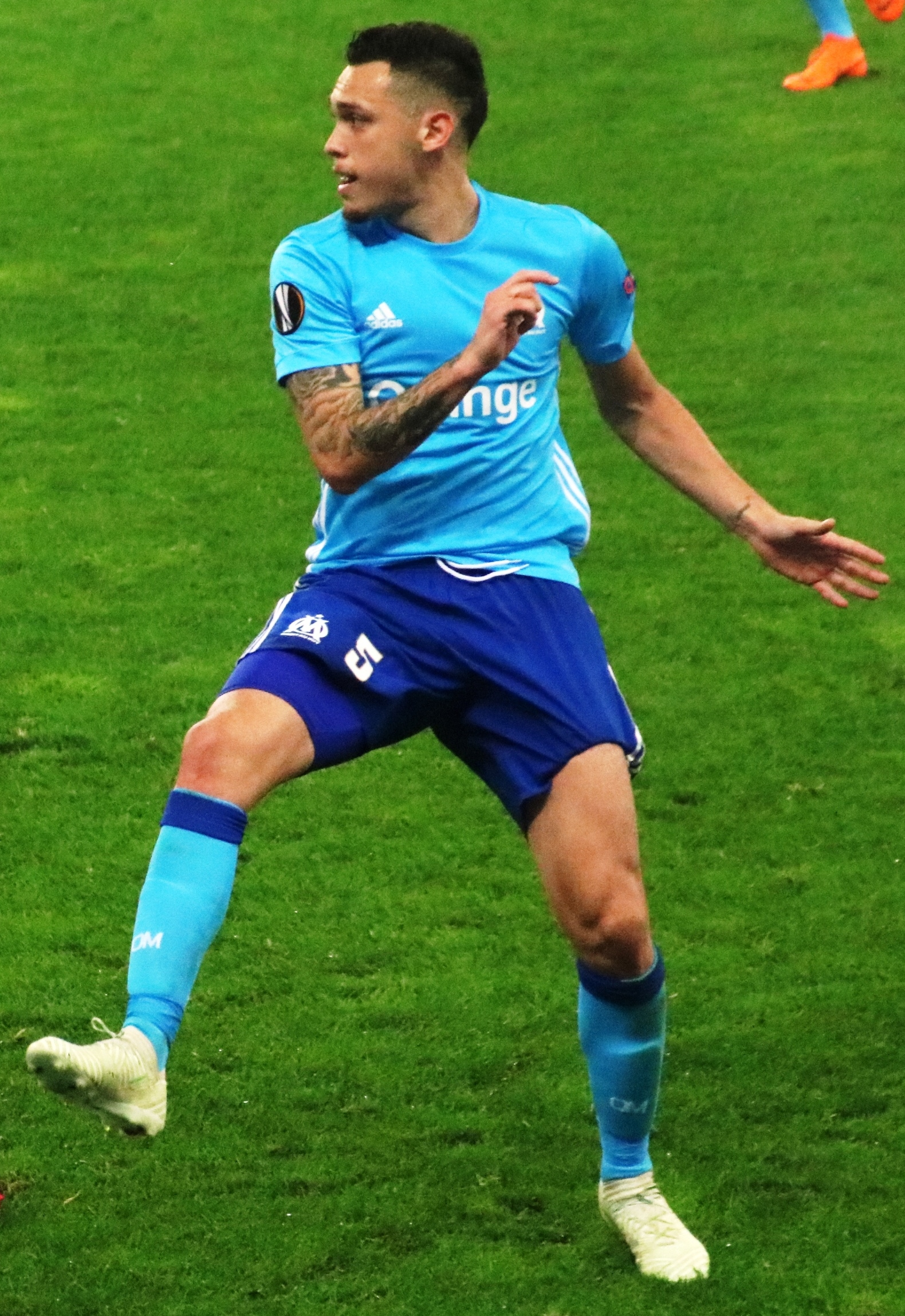
Ocampos playing for Marseille in 2018

Ocampos scored on his first Ligue 1 appearance following his return to Marseille, netting the only goal in a 1–0 win over Nantes on 12 August 2017. On 1 October, he scored a brace in the game against Nice winning the game for Marseille with 4–2. He maintained his form throughout the first half of the season, scoring 6 goals in 15 league appearances by the end of the year, which saw him linked with a move to Torino during the January transfer market. He remained at Marseille, however, and on 7 February 2018 he scored his first professional hat-trick in a 9–0 Coupe de France win over Bourg-en-Bresse. The result was also Marseille's biggest win in 70 years. He also featured regularly in the club's Europa League campaign and helped the side reach the final of the competition, where they lost 3–0 to Spanish side, Atlético Madrid. He remained with Marseille the following season before departing for Spain, having scored 28 goals in 135 appearances during his time with the club.

=== Sevilla ===
On 3 July 2019, Ocampos signed a five-year contract with La Liga side Sevilla for an undisclosed fee. On 11 August 2020, he scored the winning goal for Sevilla in the 88th minute, in a 1–0 win against Wolverhampton Wanderers in the 2019–20 UEFA Europa League quarter-finals. In his debut season with Sevilla, Ocampos scored 14 goals in La Liga to finish 4th in the table, and eventually won the Europa League. On 24 September 2020, he scored from a penalty in 1–2 defeat against Bayern Munich in the 2020 UEFA Super Cup.

==== Loan to Ajax ====
On 31 August 2022, Ocampos joined Ajax on a season-long loan. He was brought to replace Antony, who had just joined Manchester United for a record Eredivisie fee of €100m. On 17 January 2023, Ajax announced that they had terminated the loan agreement with immediate effect after Ocampos had only played 114 minutes for the club.

==== Return to Sevilla ====
On 31 May 2023, he won his second Europa league title after a 4–1 victory over Roma in the penalty shootouts after a 1–1 draw in the final, in which he managed to convert his penalty.

=== Monterrey ===
On 3 September 2024, Mexican club Monterrey reached an agreement with Sevilla to sign Ocampos for a fee reported to be in the region of €7 million.

== International career ==
Having previously represented his nation at youth level, Ocampos made his senior Argentina debut on 9 October 2019 during a friendly against Germany, coming on as a half-time substitute for Ángel Correa and scoring a late equalizer in a 2–2 draw.

== Career statistics ==
=== Club ===
As of match played on 6 September 2026

Appearances and goals by club, season and competition
Club	Season	League			National cup (Note: Includes Copa Argentina, Coupe de France, Coppa Italia, Copa del Rey)		League cup (Note: Includes Coupe de la Ligue)		Continental		Other		Total	
Club	Season	Division	Apps	Goals	Apps	Goals	Apps	Goals	Apps	Goals	Apps	Goals	Apps	Goals
River Plate	2011–12	Nacional B	38	7	1	0	—		0	0	—		39	7
River Plate	2012–13	Argentine Primera División	1	0	0	0	—		0	0	—		1	0
River Plate	Total		39	7	1	0	—		0	0	—		40	7
Monaco	2012–13	Ligue 2	29	4	2	0	2	1	—		—		33	5
Monaco	2013–14	Ligue 1	34	5	4	2	1	0	0	0	—		39	7
Monaco	2014–15	Ligue 1	17	1	2	1	1	0	6 (Note: Appearances in UEFA Champions League)	1	—		26	3
Monaco	Total		80	10	8	3	4	1	6	1	—		98	15
Marseille (loan)	2014–15	Ligue 1	14	2	0	0	0	0	0	0	—		14	2
Marseille	2015–16	Ligue 1	17	1	1	0	1	1	6 (Note: Appearances in UEFA Europa League)	2	—		25	4
Marseille	2017–18	Ligue 1	31	9	4	3	1	0	17	4	—		53	16
Marseille	2018–19	Ligue 1	34	4	1	0	1	0	4	1	—		40	5
Marseille	Total		96	16	6	3	3	1	27	7	—		132	27
Genoa (loan)	2016–17	Serie A	14	3	3	0	—		—		—		17	3
Milan (loan)	2016–17	Serie A	12	0	0	0	—		—		0	0	12	0
Sevilla	2019–20	La Liga	33	14	4	2	—		7	1	—		44	17
Sevilla	2020–21	La Liga	34	5	4	2	—		7	0	1 (Note: Appearance in UEFA Super Cup)	1	46	8
Sevilla	2021–22	La Liga	30	6	3	1	—		9 (Note: Six appearances and one goal in UEFA Champions League, three appearances and one goal in UEFA Europa League)	2	—		42	9
Sevilla	2022–23	La Liga	19	4	1	0	—		9	1	—		29	5
Sevilla	2023–24	La Liga	35	4	4	0	—		5	1	1	0	45	5
Sevilla	2024–25	La Liga	2	0	0	0	—		—		—		2	0
Sevilla	Total		153	33	16	5	—		37	5	2	1	208	44
Ajax (loan)	2022–23	Eredivisie	4	0	0	0	—		2	0	—		6	0
Monterrey	2024–25	Liga MX	28	2	—		—		2 (Note: Appearances in CONCACAF Champions Cup)	0	3 (Note: Appearances in FIFA Club World Cup)	0	33	2
Monterrey	2025–26	Liga MX	28	7	—		—		3	1	3 (Note: Appearances in Leagues Cup)	0	34	8
Monterrey	2026–27	Liga MX	5	5	—		—		0	0	6	1	11	6
Monterrey	Total		61	14	—		—		5	1	12	1	78	16
Career total			459	83	34	11	7	2	77	14	14	2	591	112

=== International ===
As of match played on 12 October 2023

Appearances and goals by national team and year
National team	Year	Apps	Goals
Argentina	2019	3	2
Argentina	2020	4	0
Argentina	2021	1	0
Argentina	2022	2	0
Argentina	2023	2	0
Total		12	2

Scores and results list Argentina's goal tally first, score column indicates score after each Ocampos goal.

List of international goals scored by Lucas Ocampos
No.	Date	Venue	Cap	Opponent	Score	Result	Competition
1	9 October 2019	Signal Iduna Park, Dortmund, Germany	1	Germany	2–2	2–2	Friendly
2	13 October 2019	Estadio Manuel Martínez Valero, Alicante, Spain	2	Ecuador	6–1	6–1	Friendly

== Honours ==
River Plate

- Primera B Nacional: 2011–12

Monaco

- Ligue 2: 2012–13

Marseille

- UEFA Europa League runner-up: 2017–18

Sevilla

- UEFA Europa League: 2019–20, 2022–23

Individual

- UEFA Europa League Squad of the Season: 2019–20
- IFFHS CONMEBOL Team of the Year: 2020
