= Germán Pezzella =

Argentine footballer (born 1991)

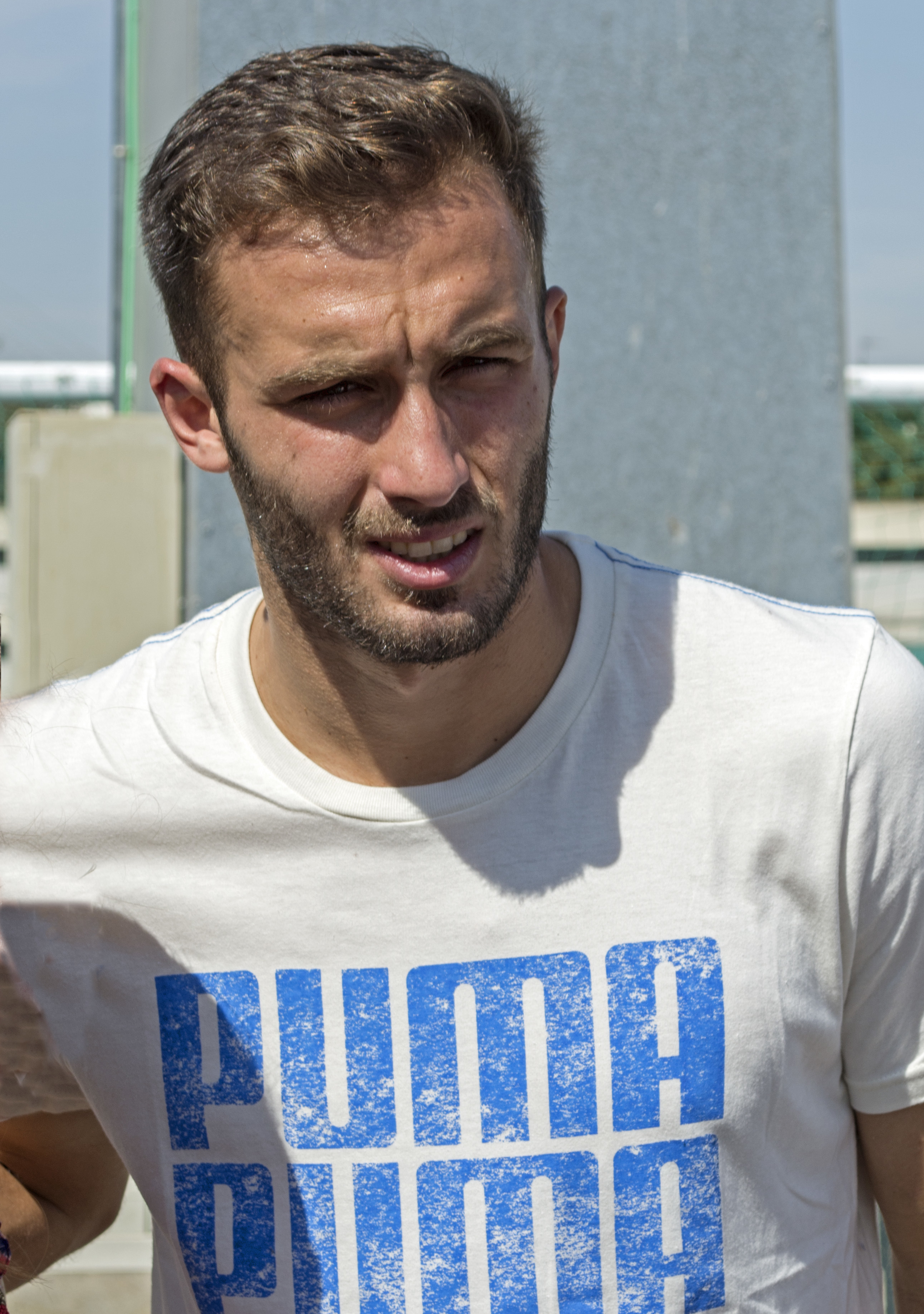
- Pezzella in 2015

Personal information
- Full name: Germán Alejo Pezzella
- Date of birth: 27 June 1991 (age 35)
- Place of birth: Bahía Blanca, Buenos Aires, Argentina
- Height: 1.90 m (6 ft 3 in)
- Position: Centre-back

Team information
- Current team: Peñarol
- Number: 2

Youth career
- Kilómetro Cinco
- Juventud Unida
- 2000–2005: Olimpo
- 2005–2011: River Plate

Senior career*
Years	Team	Apps	(Gls)
2011–2015	River Plate	43	(2)
2015–2018	Betis	61	(4)
2017–2018	→ Fiorentina (loan)	34	(1)
2018–2021	Fiorentina	97	(6)
2021–2024	Betis	86	(2)
2024–2026	River Plate	31	(0)
2026–	Peñarol	11	(0)

International career^{‡}
2009–2011	Argentina U20	15	(0)
2011	Argentina U23	5	(2)
2017–2024	Argentina	42	(3)
Medal record
Men's football
Representing Argentina
FIFA World Cup
Winner	2022 Qatar
Copa América
Winner	2021 Brazil
Winner	2024 United States
Third place	2019 Brazil
CONMEBOL–UEFA Cup of Champions
Winner	2022 England
Pan American Games
Silver medal – second place	2011 Guadalajara	Team
South American U-20 Championship
Third place	2011 Peru
- * Club domestic league appearances and goals as of 18:08, 22 November 2026 (UTC) ‡ National team caps and goals as of 10 October 2024 (UTC)

Germán Alejo Pezzella (Spanish pronunciation: [xeɾˈman aˈlexo peˈsela]; born 27 June 1991) is an Argentine professional footballer who plays as a centre-back for Uruguayan Primera División club Peñarol. A former international for the Argentina national team, Pezzella was part of the team who won the 2022 FIFA World Cup.

== Club career ==
=== Early career ===
After impressing with the former's reserves he was called up to the pre-season in Canada, appearing in friendlies against Toronto FC, Montreal Impact and Everton.

=== River Plate ===
Upon being an unused substitute in a goalless away draw against Club Atlético Huracán on 18 October 2009, Pezzella made his senior debut on 7 December 2011, starting in a 1–0 home victory against Defensores de Belgrano for the season's Copa Argentina. His league debut came on March 2, 2012, where he played the full 90 minutes in a 0–0 home draw against Quilmes Atlético Club.

Pezzella scored his first professional goal on September 2, 2012, in a 1–1 draw against Club Atlético Colón. He also scored the equalizer in a 1–1 Superclásico home draw against Boca Juniors, just three minutes after coming off the bench.

On 10 December 2014, Pezzella scored the last in a 2014 Copa Sudamericana final 2–0 win against Atlético Nacional, as his side won its first international title after a 17-year absence.

=== Playing abroad ===
On 10 July 2015, Pezzella signed a five-year contract with Real Betis, newly promoted to La Liga. He made his debut for the club on 23 August, starting in a 1–1 home draw against Villarreal CF.

After a loan spell with Serie A club Fiorentina during the 2017–18 season, Pezzella signed a five-year contract with the club that runs through the end of the 2021–22 season for an €11m transfer fee. Ahead of the 2018–19 season, he was named the club's new captain. On August 19, 2021, Pezzella returned to Betis after signing a four-year deal.

=== Return to River Plate ===
On 5 August 2024, Pezzella returned to River Plate after nine years abroad.

== International career ==
=== Youth ===
On 1 September 2011, Pezzella was called up to that year's Pan American Games,

=== Senior ===
In October 2017, Pezzella received his first call-up to Argentina national team for the 2018 FIFA World Cup qualification against Peru and Ecuador, respectively the same year on 5 and 10 October. On 11 November, he debuted in a 1–0 friendly draw against Russia. In May 2018, Pezzella was named in the Argentina national team's preliminary 35-man squad for the 2018 FIFA World Cup in Russia, but did not make the final 23.

On 27 March 2019, Pezzella served as captain of Argentina in an away 1–0 friendly win against Morocco. He was included in Argentina's 26-man squad for the 2022 FIFA World Cup, coming on as a substitute in extra-time of the final as his country won a third world title by defeating France on penalties.

In June 2024, Pezzella was included in Lionel Scaloni's final 26-man Argentina squad for the 2024 Copa América.

== Career statistics ==
=== Club ===
As of match played 5 May 2024

Appearances and goals by club, season and competition
Club	Season	League			National cup (Note: Includes Copa Argentina, Copa del Rey, Coppa Italia)		Continental		Other		Total	
Club	Season	Division	Apps	Goals	Apps	Goals	Apps	Goals	Apps	Goals	Apps	Goals
River Plate	2011–12	Primera B	1	0	5	0	–		–		1	0
River Plate	2012–13	Argentine Primera División	10	1	0	0	–		–		10	1
River Plate	2013–14	Argentine Primera División	15	0	0	0	5 (Note: Appearances in Copa Sudamericana)	0	1 (Note: Appearance in Copa Campeonato)	1	21	1
River Plate	2014	Argentine Primera División	10	1	2	0	8	2	–		20	3
River Plate	2015	Argentine Primera División	7	1	1	0	4 (Note: Appearances in Copa Libertadores)	0	1 (Note: Appearances in Recopa Sudamericana)	0	13	1
River Plate	Total		43	3	8	0	17	2	2	1	65	6
Real Betis	2015–16	La Liga	25	3	4	0	–		–		29	4
Real Betis	2016–17	La Liga	36	1	1	0	–		–		37	1
Real Betis	Total		61	4	5	0	–		–		66	5
Fiorentina (loan)	2017–18	Serie A	34	1	1	0	–		–		35	1
Fiorentina	2018–19	Serie A	32	2	3	0	–		–		35	2
Fiorentina	2019–20	Serie A	33	3	1	0	–		–		34	3
Fiorentina	2020–21	Serie A	32	1	1	0	–		–		33	1
Fiorentina	2021–22	Serie A	0	0	1	0	–		–		1	0
Fiorentina	Total		97	6	6	0	–		–		103	6
Real Betis	2021–22	La Liga	23	1	4	0	7 (Note: Appearances in UEFA Europa League)	0	–		34	1
Real Betis	2022–23	La Liga	31	0	1	0	6	0	1 (Note: Appearance in Supercopa de España)	0	39	0
Real Betis	2023–24	La Liga	32	1	1	0	7 (Note: Six appearances in UEFA Europa League, one appearance in UEFA Europa Conference League)	0	–		40	1
Real Betis	Total		86	2	6	0	20	0	1	0	113	2
Career total			320	16	26	0	37	2	3	1	382	19

=== International ===
As of match played 10 October 2024

Appearances and goals by national team and year
National team	Year	Apps	Goals
Argentina	2017	2	0
Argentina	2018	4	1
Argentina	2019	10	1
Argentina	2021	10	0
Argentina	2022	9	0
Argentina	2023	4	1
Argentina	2024	3	0
Total		42	3

Scores and results list Argentina's goal tally first, score column indicates score after each Pezzella goal.

List of international goals scored by Germán Pezzella
No.	Date	Venue	Opponent	Score	Result	Competition
1	11 October 2018	Prince Faisal bin Fahd Stadium, Riyadh, Saudi Arabia	Iraq	3–0	4–0	2018 Superclásico Championship
2	13 October 2019	Estadio Manuel Martínez Valero, Alicante, Spain	Ecuador	4–1	6–1	Friendly
3	15 June 2023	Workers' Stadium, Beijing, China	Australia	2–0	2–0	Friendly

== Honours ==
River Plate

- Primera División: 2014 Final
- Copa Campeonato: 2014
- Copa Sudamericana: 2014
- Recopa Sudamericana: 2015
- Copa Libertadores: 2015

Real Betis

- Copa del Rey: 2021–22

Argentina

- FIFA World Cup: 2022
- Copa América: 2021, 2024
- CONMEBOL–UEFA Cup of Champions: 2022
