= Nicolás Minici =

Argentine professional footballer

Personal information
- Full name: Nicolás Guillermo Minici
- Date of birth: 23 August 1984 (age 42)
- Place of birth: Buenos Aires, Argentina
- Height: 1.84 m (6 ft 0 in)
- Positions: Defender; midfielder

Senior career*
Years	Team	Apps	(Gls)
2003–2004	UAI Urquiza	17	(0)
2004–2006	Fénix	38	(2)
2006–2008	Acassuso	48	(5)
2008–2009	Deportivo Español	23	(0)
2009	Racing Club	0	(0)
2010	Los Andes	18	(1)
2010–2011	Deportivo Merlo	23	(2)
2011–2012	Gimnasia y Esgrima	24	(2)
2012–2013	Huracán	17	(0)
2013–2014	Acassuso	37	(5)
2014	Guaraní Antonio Franco	6	(0)
2015	Acassuso	34	(3)
2016–2017	Deportivo Morón	26	(1)
2017–2020	Barracas Central	33	(1)
2023-2024	Polisportiva Buddusò		
- * Club domestic league appearances and goals as of 22:52, 23 September 2020 (UTC)

Nicolás Guillermo Minici (born 23 August 1984) is an Argentine professional footballer who plays as a defender or midfielder.

== Career ==
Minici's senior career began in 2003, and he played seventeen times for UAI Urquiza in Primera D Metropolitana. A move followed in 2004 to Fénix, which won the league, prior to Minici staying in Primera C Metropolitana after agreeing terms with Acassuso in 2006. That club won promotion as champions in 2006–07, therefore earning a spot in Primera B Metropolitana for 2007–08. Having featured twenty-one times and scored thrice in the next season, Minici joined fellow third tier club Deportivo Español in 2008. Twenty-three appearances for them followed, which led to Primera División side Racing Club signing him in 2009.

Minici left Racing Club months later after not appearing in their first-team, subsequently joining Los Andes on 31 January 2010. Minici then completed a move to Deportivo Merlo less than eight months later, followed by a spell with Primera B Nacional's Gimnasia y Esgrima in 2011–12. He scored goals against Defensa y Justicia and eventual champions River Plate in the aforementioned season. Minici joined Huracán in July 2012, making his debut in a 3–1 loss to Aldosivi and appearing in a total of seventeen matches for them. After one campaign in the ranks of Huracán, Minici departed to return to a former club of his - Acassuso.

Seventy-one games and eleven goals followed with Acassuso, though they came in two stints on either side of a six-month spell with Guaraní Antonio Franco of tier two to conclude 2014. In January 2016, Minici agreed to sign for Deportivo Morón. He remained for 2016 and 2016–17, with the latter culminating with the defender's third senior title win. Minici, however, stayed in Primera B Metropolitana as he moved to Barracas Central. His first appearance came against former team Acassuso in September 2017, while his first goal occurred against Deportivo Español, whom he had spent time with in 2008 and 2009.

== Career statistics ==
As of 1 May 2019.

Appearances and goals by club, season and competition
Club	Season	League			Cup		League Cup		Continental		Other		Total	
Club	Season	Division	Apps	Goals	Apps	Goals	Apps	Goals	Apps	Goals	Apps	Goals	Apps	Goals
UAI Urquiza	2003–04	Primera D Metropolitana	17	0	0	0	—		—		0	0	17	0
Fénix	2004–05	Primera D Metropolitana	22	2	0	0	—		—		0	0	22	2
Fénix	2005–06	Primera C Metropolitana	16	0	0	0	—		—		0	0	16	0
Fénix	Total		38	2	0	0	—		—		0	0	38	2
Acassuso	2006–07	Primera C Metropolitana	27	2	0	0	—		—		0	0	27	2
Acassuso	2007–08	Primera B Metropolitana	21	3	0	0	—		—		0	0	21	3
Acassuso	Total		48	5	0	0	—		—		0	0	48	5
Deportivo Español	2008–09	Primera B Metropolitana	23	0	0	0	—		—		0	0	23	0
Racing Club	2009–10	Primera División	0	0	0	0	—		—		0	0	0	0
Los Andes	2009–10	Primera B Metropolitana	18	1	0	0	—		—		0	0	18	1
Deportivo Merlo	2010–11	Primera B Nacional	23	2	0	0	—		—		0	0	23	2
Gimnasia y Esgrima	2011–12	Primera B Nacional	24	2	1	0	—		—		0	0	25	2
Huracán	2012–13	Primera B Nacional	17	0	0	0	—		—		0	0	17	0
Acassuso	2013–14	Primera B Metropolitana	37	5	3	3	—		—		0	0	40	8
Guaraní Antonio Franco	2014	Primera B Nacional	6	0	0	0	—		—		0	0	6	0
Acassuso	2015	Primera B Metropolitana	34	3	4	0	—		—		0	0	38	3
Deportivo Morón	2016	Primera B Metropolitana	9	0	0	0	—		—		0	0	9	0
Deportivo Morón	2016–17	Primera B Metropolitana	17	1	2	1	—		—		0	0	19	2
Deportivo Morón	Total		26	1	2	1	—		—		0	0	28	2
Barracas Central	2017–18	Primera B Metropolitana	19	0	0	0	—		—		0	0	19	0
Barracas Central	2018–19	Primera B Metropolitana	13	1	1	0	—		—		0	0	14	1
Barracas Central	Total		32	1	1	0	—		—		0	0	33	1
Career total			343	22	11	4	—		—		0	0	354	26

== Honours ==
Fénix

- Primera D Metropolitana: 2004–05

Acassuso

- Primera C Metropolitana: 2006–07

Deportivo Morón

- Primera B Metropolitana: 2016–17

Barracas Central

- Primera B Metropolitana: 2018–19
