= Carlos Sánchez (footballer, born 1984) =

Uruguayan footballer (born 1984)

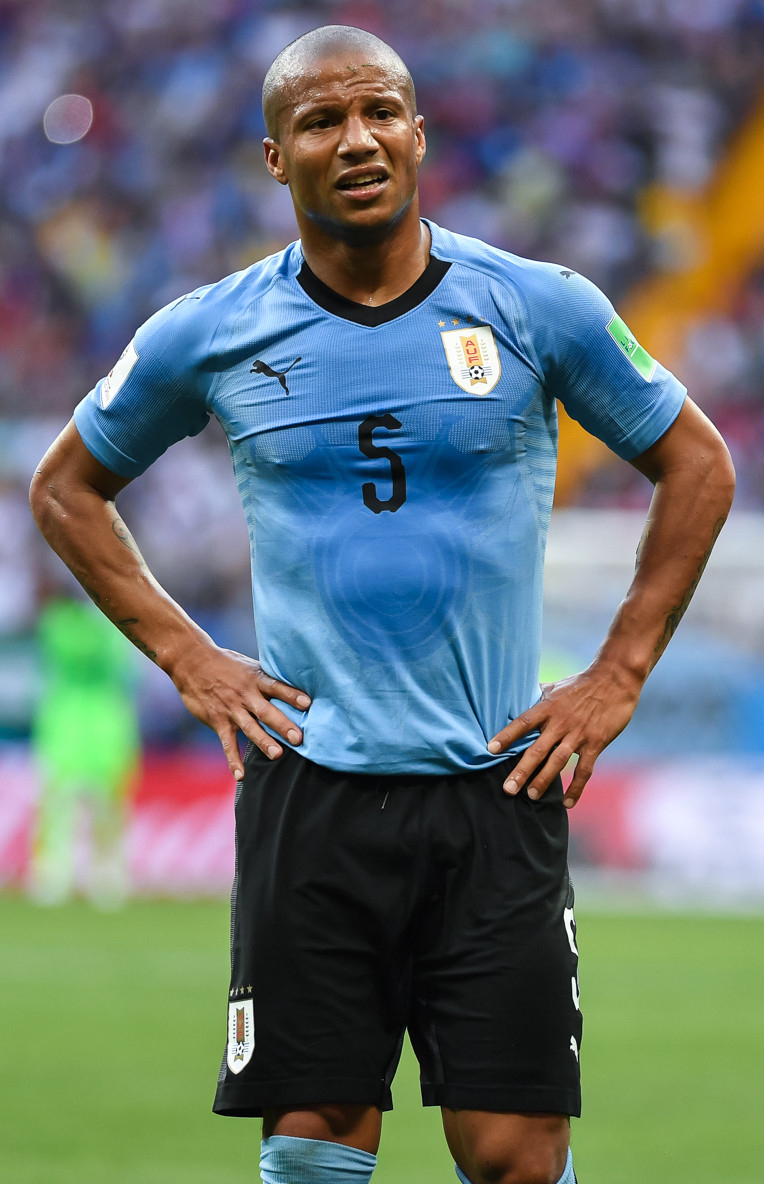
- Sánchez with Uruguay at the 2018 FIFA World Cup

Personal information
- Full name: Carlos Andrés Sánchez Arcosa
- Date of birth: 2 December 1984 (age 41)
- Place of birth: Montevideo, Uruguay
- Height: 1.72 m (5 ft 8 in)
- Position: Attacking midfielder

Team information
- Current team: Rentistas
- Number: 8

Youth career
- Nueva Juventud
- Salus
- 2002–2003: Liverpool Montevideo

Senior career*
Years	Team	Apps	(Gls)
2003–2009	Liverpool Montevideo	83	(2)
2009–2011	Godoy Cruz	49	(6)
2011–2015	River Plate	100	(17)
2013–2014	→ Puebla (loan)	26	(7)
2016–2018	Monterrey	91	(18)
2018–2022	Santos	134	(25)
2023	Peñarol	20	(3)
2024	Uruguay Montevideo	21	(6)
2025–	Rentistas	19	(8)

International career
2014–2018	Uruguay	38	(1)
- * Club domestic league appearances and goals as of 18 October 2025

Carlos Andrés Sánchez Arcosa (pronounced [ˈkaɾlos anˈdɾes ˈsantʃes]; born 2 December 1984) is a Uruguayan professional footballer who plays for Uruguayan Segunda División club Rentistas. Mainly an attacking midfielder, he can also play as a right winger. Sánchez is often nicknamed as "Pato" ("Duck") in his native country Uruguay, where he played for the national team.

== Early life ==
Born in Montevideo, Sánchez was abandoned by his father at the age of eight, and lived with his mother and four brothers in his uncle's house; around that time, he started cutting his kinky hair short in order to avoid being mocked by his schoolmates. With his mother working as a domestic employee and his uncle as a bricklayer, Sánchez worked part-time on a bakery to help on providing food to the family.

== Club career ==
=== Liverpool Montevideo ===
Sánchez began his career with lowly side Nueva Juventud Baby Fútbol, and had failed trials at Montevideo Wanderers, Fénix, Cerro and River Plate until joining Liverpool's youth setup after a recommendation from Carlos Iglesias, and old coach of his at Salus FC. He was promoted to the main squad in 2003 by manager Julio Ribas, only six months after arriving at the club.

While at Liverpool, Sánchez played regularly for the club in the Uruguayan Primera División, and also overcame a serious injury which kept him sidelined for nearly two years.

=== Godoy Cruz ===
On 31 December 2009, Sánchez signed a two-year contract with Argentine Primera División side Godoy Cruz. He made his debut for the club the following 13 February, coming on as a second-half substitute for Leandro Torres in a 0–0 away draw against Huracán.

Sánchez scored his first goal for Godoy Cruz on 3 March 2010, netting the winner in a 2–1 home defeat of Lanús. He became an undisputed starter for the side during the 2010–11 season, contributing with four goals in 33 appearances.

=== River Plate ===
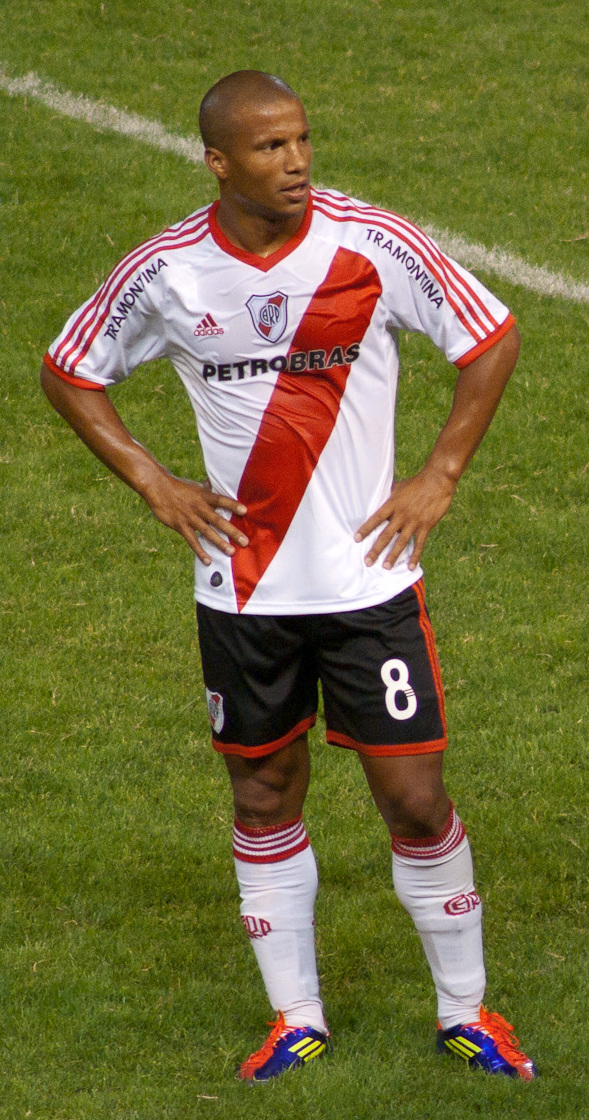
Sanchez playing for River Plate

On 20 July 2011, Sánchez and Godoy Cruz teammate Martín Aguirre joined River Plate for a fee of US$ 2.9 million. River retained 50% of his federative rights. He made his debut for the club on 17 August by playing the full 90 minutes in a 1–0 Primera B Nacional home win against Chacarita Juniors, and scored his first goal three days later by netting the last in a 3–1 away defeat of Independiente Rivadavia.

Bought outright in 2012, Sánchez was an undisputed starter for the Millonarios in the following campaigns, and scored a brace in a 5–0 home routing of former side Godoy Cruz on 7 October 2012. On 9 August 2013, he was loaned to Liga MX side Puebla, mainly to free up a foreign player registration.

Sánchez returned to River in June 2014, and renewed his contract until December 2016 on 9 July. He scored a double in a 3–0 home success over Defensa y Justicia on 28 August, and finished the year as champions of the Copa Sudamericana. During the 2015 campaign, he was a regular starter in the Copa Libertadores winning run, scoring in the second leg of the Final against Tigres UANL (3–0 aggregate win).

Sánchez also scored one goal in the 2015 Suruga Bank Championship, netting the opener in a 3–0 win against Gamba Osaka. On 31 December 2015, he was named the South American Footballer of the Year, beating Carlos Tevez and Miller Bolaños and becoming the first Uruguayan to win the award after Enzo Francescoli in 1995.

=== Monterrey ===
On 14 November 2015, Monterrey announced that they had reached an agreement River for the transfer of Sánchez. He was presented on 22 December, signing a three-year contract with the club.

=== Santos ===
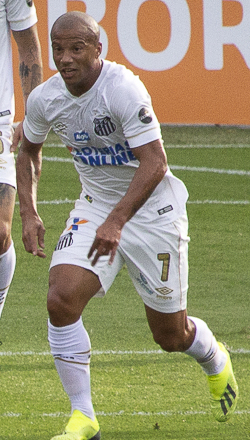
Sánchez playing for Santos in 2018

On 23 July 2018, Brazilian Série A side Santos FC announced the signing of Sánchez on a three-year deal. He made his debut on 4 August, starting in a 0–0 away draw against Botafogo.

Sánchez made his Libertadores debut for Peixe on 21 August 2018, starting in a 0–0 away draw against Independiente. He was, however, suspended for assaulting a ball boy during a Sudamericana match for River back in 2015, and Santos was given a 3–0 defeat; he was still declared free to play the second leg at the Pacaembu Stadium, which also ended in a 0–0 draw.

Sánchez was subsequently a regular starter for the club, but suffered a knee injury which kept him out for the remainder of the 2020 season in October. On 7 June 2021, he renewed his contract until July 2023.

On 28 July 2021, Sánchez scored a stoppage-time goal in a 4–0 Copa do Brasil home win over Juazeirense through a penalty kick, and took his tally at the club to 27 goals, becoming the foreigner who scored more goals for Santos, surpassing Jonathan Copete. On 4 January 2023, he terminated his contract with the club, after scoring 32 goals in 160 official matches.

=== Peñarol ===
Just hours after leaving Santos, Sánchez was announced at Peñarol back in his home country, on a one-year contract.

== International career ==
On 13 November 2014, Sánchez made his debut for the Uruguay football team at the age of 29 against Costa Rica, starting in a 3–3 draw.

Sánchez was included in Uruguay's squad for the 2015 Copa América by coach Óscar Tabárez. He was also named among the 23-men for the Copa América Centenario.

Sánchez scored his first goal for the Celestes on 28 March 2017, netting the opener in a 2–1 loss against Peru. In May of the following year, he was named in Uruguay's senior 26-man squad for the 2018 FIFA World Cup in Russia, being also included in the final list on 2 June.

== Personal life ==
Sánchez's half-brother Nicolás De La Cruz is also a footballer. He too was groomed at Liverpool, and played for River Plate and is now playing for flamengo.

Sánchez obtained Argentine citizenship in December 2014.

== Career statistics ==
=== Club ===
As of 4 January 2023

Appearances and goals by club, season and competition
Club	Season	League			Cup		Continental		State League		Other		Total	
Club	Season	Division	Apps	Goals	Apps	Goals	Apps	Goals	Apps	Goals	Apps	Goals	Apps	Goals
Liverpool Montevideo	2003	Uruguayan Primera División	1	0	0	0	—		—		—		1	0
Liverpool Montevideo	2004	Uruguayan Primera División	14	0	0	0	—		—		—		14	0
Liverpool Montevideo	2005	Uruguayan Primera División	15	0	0	0	—		—		—		15	0
Liverpool Montevideo	2005–06	Uruguayan Primera División	23	0	0	0	—		—		—		23	0
Liverpool Montevideo	2006–07	Uruguayan Primera División	4	1	0	0	—		—		—		4	1
Liverpool Montevideo	2007–08	Uruguayan Primera División	0	0	0	0	—		—		—		0	0
Liverpool Montevideo	2008–09	Uruguayan Primera División	13	0	5	0	—		—		—		18	0
Liverpool Montevideo	2009–10	Uruguayan Primera División	13	1	0	0	2 (Note: Appearance(s) in Copa Sudamericana)	0	—		—		15	1
Liverpool Montevideo	Total		83	2	5	0	2	0	0	0	0	0	90	2
Godoy Cruz	2009–10	Argentine Primera División	16	2	0	0	—		—		—		16	2
Godoy Cruz	2010–11	Argentine Primera División	33	4	0	0	6 (Note: Appearance(s) in Copa Libertadores)	1	—		—		39	5
Godoy Cruz	Total		49	6	0	0	6	1	0	0	0	0	55	7
River Plate	2011–12	Primera B Nacional	34	4	0	0	—		—		—		34	4
River Plate	2012–13	Primera División	34	6	0	0	—		—		—		34	6
River Plate	2013–14	Primera División	1	0	0	0	—		—		—		1	0
River Plate	2014	Primera División	16	5	1	0	9	1	—		—		26	6
River Plate	2015	Primera División	15	2	1	0	20 (Note: Fourteen appearances and four goals in Copa Libertadores, six appearances and three goals in Copa Sudamericana)	7	—		6 (Note: Two appearances and two goals in Recopa Sudamericana, one appearance and one goal in Suruga Bank Championship, one appearance in Supercopa Argentina, two appearances in FIFA Club World Cup)	3	42	12
River Plate	Total		100	17	17	3	29	8	0	0	6	3	137	28
Puebla (loan)	2013–14	Liga MX	27	6	0	0	—		—		—		27	6
Monterrey	2015–16	Liga MX	21	9	4	0	—		—		—		25	9
Monterrey	2016–17	Liga MX	32	4	2	0	2 (Note: Appearance(s) in CONCACAF Champions League)	0	—		—		36	4
Monterrey	2017–18	Liga MX	38	5	10	7	—		—		—		48	12
Monterrey	Total		91	18	16	7	2	0	0	0	0	0	109	25
Santos	2018	Série A	16	4	0	0	2	0	—		—		18	4
Santos	2019	Série A	34	12	6	4	2	0	15 (Note: Appearance(s) in Campeonato Paulista)	3	—		57	19
Santos	2020	Série A	12	0	0	0	5	1	11	1	—		28	2
Santos	2021	Série A	28	5	4	1	4	1	—		—		36	7
Santos	2022	Série A	14	0	1	0	2	0	4	0	—		21	0
Santos	Total		104	21	11	5	15	2	30	4	0	0	160	32
Peñarol	2023	Uruguayan Primera División	0	0	0	0	0	0	—		—		0	0
Career total			454	70	34	12	54	11	30	4	6	3	578	100

=== International ===
Appearances and goals by national team and year
National team	Year	Apps	Goals
Uruguay	2014	2	0
Uruguay	2015	12	0
Uruguay	2016	12	0
Uruguay	2017	7	1
Uruguay	2018	5	0
Total		38	1

Scores and results list Uruguay's goal tally first, score column indicates score after each Sánchez goal.

List of international goals scored by Carlos Sánchez
No.	Date	Venue	Opponent	Score	Result	Competition
1	28 March 2017	Estadio Nacional de Lima, Lima, Peru	Peru	1–0	1–2	2018 FIFA World Cup qualification

== Honours ==
River Plate

- Primera B Nacional: 2011–12
- Copa Libertadores: 2015
- Copa Sudamericana: 2014
- Recopa Sudamericana: 2015
- Suruga Bank Championship: 2015
- FIFA Club World Cup runner-up: 2015

Monterrey

- Copa MX: Apertura 2017

Peñarol

- Uruguayan Primera División: 2023 Apertura

Individual

- The Américas Best XI: 2014, 2015
- Prelist FIFA Ballon d'Or: 2015
- South American Footballer of the Year: 2015
- Copa Libertadores Best XI: 2015
- Recopa Sudamericana Top Scorer: 2015
- Copa MX Top Scorer: Apertura 2017
