= Raúl Damiani =

Argentine footballer (born 1979)

Personal information
- Date of birth: April 29, 1979 (age 47)
- Place of birth: Roldán, Santa Fe, Argentina
- Height: 1.72 m (5 ft 8 in)
- Position: Defender

Senior career*
Years	Team	Apps	(Gls)
1997–2002	Newell's Old Boys	71	(2)
2002–2004	Independiente	35	(0)
2004–2007	Libertad	81	(3)
2008–2010	San Martín de San Juan	71	(1)
2010–2014	Instituto	155	(11)
Total		224	(12)
- * Club domestic league appearances and goals

Raúl Damiani (born April 29, 1979, in Roldán, Santa Fe, Argentina) is an Argentine football defender currently playing for Instituto of the Primera B Nacional in Argentina. He played as a right back.

== Teams ==
- (Argentina) Newell's Old Boys 1997–2002
- (Argentina) Independiente 2002–2003
- (Paraguay) Libertad 2004–2007
- (Argentina) San Martín de San Juan 2008–2010
- (Argentina) Instituto 2010–present
