= Juan Pablo Pompei =

Argentine football referee

- Full name: Juan Pablo Pompei
- Born: September 18, 1968 (age 58); Olavarría, Argentina
- Other occupation: Instructor and referee assessor

Domestic
| Years | League | Role |
| 1999–2018 | Argentine Primera División | Referee |

International
| Years | League | Role |
| 2004–2011 | FIFA listed | Referee |

Juan Pablo Pompei (born 18 September 1968) is an Argentine former football referee. He officiated in the Argentine Primera División from 1999 to 2018 and was a FIFA-listed international referee between 2004 and 2011. Pompei is regarded as one of the most experienced referees of his generation in Argentine football.

== Early life ==
Pompei was born in Olavarría, Buenos Aires Province. His family had a strong connection to refereeing: both his father and brother were local referees. Before turning professional, he played amateur football and at age 21 took the referee course run by his father.

== Refereeing career ==
=== Domestic career ===
Pompei began his officiating career in Olavarría's local league and advanced through regional divisions before debuting in the Argentine Primera División in December 1999, refereeing a match between Colón de Santa Fe and Argentinos Juniors.

Over nearly two decades, he officiated more than 420 matches in the top flight, including many involving Boca Juniors, River Plate, and other major clubs. He recalled that the 2006 season was the only one in which he worked every league round without missing a match.

=== International career ===
Pompei became a FIFA-listed referee in 2004, which allowed him to officiate in continental competitions such as the Copa Libertadores and Copa Sudamericana until 2011.

== Notable matches and incidents ==
Pompei took charge of several high-profile domestic derbies. He officiated Boca Juniors–Newell's Old Boys games during Boca's long unbeaten run in the early 2010s.

A widely remembered match occurred on 18 August 2005 between Newell's Old Boys and Rosario Central, when defender Nicolás Spolli made a brutal tackle on Paulo Ferrari. Pompei showed only a yellow card, a decision that provoked heavy media debate.

== Retirement and later work ==
Pompei retired from refereeing in May 2018 after nearly 19 years in the top division. His final match was between Lanús and Atlético Tucumán. Following retirement, he expressed his wish to remain involved as a referee instructor and mentor to younger officials.

== Personal life ==
Pompei is married and has two children. His son Valentín Pompei has also become a referee. He has spoken about the personal sacrifices of the profession, including time away from family and missed celebrations.
