= Rogelio Funes Mori =

Footballer (born 1991)

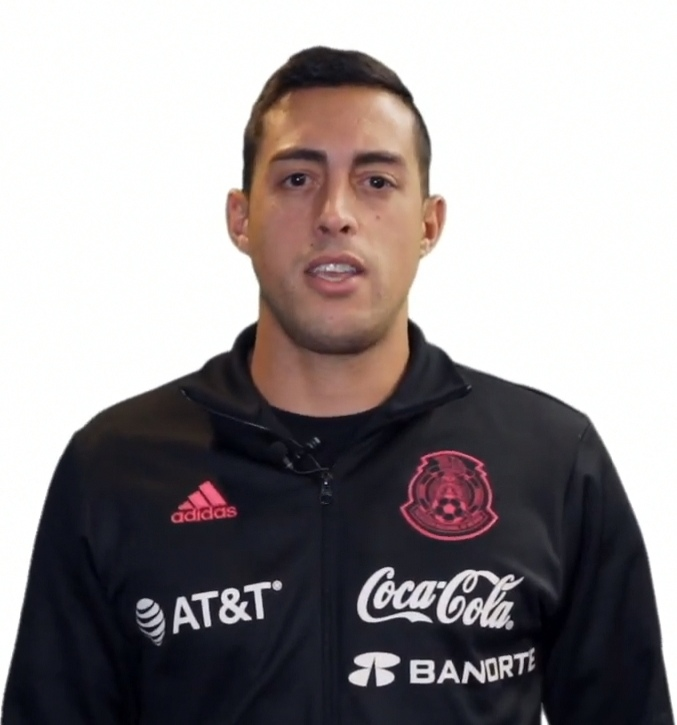
- Funes Mori with Mexico in 2022

Personal information
- Full name: Rogelio Gabriel Funes Mori
- Date of birth: 5 March 1991 (age 35)
- Place of birth: Mendoza, Argentina
- Height: 1.86 m (6 ft 1 in)
- Position: Forward

Team information
- Current team: Universidad de Concepción

Youth career
- 2001–2008: Associated Soccer Group
- 2008: FC Dallas
- 2008–2009: River Plate

Senior career*
Years	Team	Apps	(Gls)
2009–2013	River Plate	100	(20)
2013–2015	Benfica	2	(0)
2013–2015	Benfica B	12	(13)
2014–2015	→ Eskişehirspor (loan)	29	(8)
2015–2023	Monterrey	268	(132)
2024–2025	UNAM	44	(2)
2025–2026	León	22	(1)
2026–	Universidad de Concepción	0	(0)

International career^{‡}
2007–2008	Argentina U17	2	(0)
2010–2011	Argentina U20	12	(4)
2012	Argentina	1	(0)
2021–2022	Mexico	17	(6)
Medal record
Men's football
Representing Mexico
CONCACAF Gold Cup
Runner-up	2021 United States	Team
- * Club domestic league appearances and goals as of 13 August 2026 ‡ National team caps and goals as of 30 November 2022

Rogelio Gabriel Funes Mori (born 5 March 1991) is an Argentine professional footballer who plays as a forward for Chilean Primera División club Universidad de Concepción.

Funes Mori made his professional debut with River Plate, spending four years there before moving to Benfica in Portugal. In search of playing time, he signed with Monterrey in Mexico, where he quickly established himself as one of the top strikers in the league. He eventually overtook Humberto Suazo to become the all-time leading scorer for the club.

At international level, Funes Mori played for Argentina at the youth level before switching his allegiance to Mexico at a later stage in his career.

His identical twin brother José Ramiro is also a footballer who played as a defender for Premier League club Everton and La Liga outfit Villarreal and for the Argentina national team.

== Early life ==
Funes Mori was born in Mendoza, Argentina. In 2001, he moved to Arlington, Texas, US, and attended Workman Junior High and Arlington High School, where he was coached by Jeff Waldrop and played football with his twin brother, Ramiro. The twins' father, Miguel, played professional football in Argentina with clubs such as Independiente Rivadavia and Club Atlético Argentino in the 1980s. Funes Mori scored 40 goals in the 2008 season leading his team to District Champions and Area Finalist with a record of 24–2–1. Rogelio and Ramiro, who are identical twins, also played several seasons for the Associated Soccer Group (ASG) 91 team. His coach with ASG was Uche Okafor.

After that, Chelsea scout Jorge Alvial scouted Rogelio and Ramiro on the first day of the reality show Sueño MLS, and spoke to his parents about a future tryout at Chelsea. He participated in Sueño MLS and won the contest, therefore becoming part of FC Dallas.

== Club career ==
=== River Plate ===
Funes Mori began his professional career with River Plate in the Argentine Primera División on 6 December 2009, in a 1–3 defeat against Vélez Sársfield. He played the last two games of that year at home against Racing Club and away to Tigre, scoring his first goal with the club in their visit to the latter.

In the traditional pre-season encounters for the big clubs in Argentina, the Torneos de Verano, he scored for River in a 3–1 victory over their rivals Boca Juniors in Mar del Plata's Copa Desafío.

On 9 May, during the 2010 Clausura tournament, he scored his first hat-trick for River Plate in a game against Racing Club. He achieved the three goals in only 24 minutes, breaking a personal 11-match streak without scoring a goal. In the last game of the tournament, the forward scored River's only goal in a 1–5 loss to Tigre at home.

In the first game of the 2010 Apertura, he scored a 90th-minute goal following an assist from Ariel Ortega to secure a 1–0 victory over Tigre. This was his third goal in three games against that team. In the third fixture, against Independiente, he scored two goals in the first half as River went on to win 3–2. The forward scored his fourth goal of the season in the 1–0 victory over Arsenal de Sarandí.

=== Benfica ===
On 10 August 2013, Funes Mori joined Benfica on a five-year contract. River Plate received €2 million from an investment group who kept a share of its economic rights, with Benfica receiving half, plus the sports rights.

On 15 September, he made his debut for Benfica B, scoring his first goal in a Benfica shirt. On 15 March, he scored four goals for the B side against Sporting Covilhã in a 4–0 win. On 9 July 2014, he was loaned to Eskişehirspor in Turkey for one year, with the option to make the move permanent for a €3.5 million fee.

=== Monterrey ===
On 12 June 2015, Funes Mori moved to Liga MX club Monterrey. He made his debut in a 3–2 friendly win over Morelia, scoring in the 91st minute. On 6 August 2016, he scored his first hat-trick against León.

He scored his 100th goal for the club on 18 December 2019 in the Club World Cup semi-final against Premiere League club Liverpool, making it 1–1 partial at the 14th minute but culminating in a 2–1 loss. After their participation at the Club World Cup, Monterrey disputed the Apertura championship finals against América. In the second leg, he scored the tying aggregate goal in order to take the match into overtime, where the winner was determined via a penalty shootout and Monterrey ultimately won 4–2. He was included in the tournament's Best XI.

On 7 January 2024, Monterrey bid farewell to Funes Mori.

=== Late career ===
On 9 January 2024, Funes Mori joined UNAM. On 1 July 2025, UNAM terminated his contract.

On 24 July 2025, Club León announced the arrival of Funes Mori.

Following León, Funes Mori moved to Chile and joined Universidad de Concepción on 13 August 2026.

== International career ==
=== Argentina ===
Funes Mori was called up by Walter Perazzo to be part of the Argentina under-20 squad that participated in the 2011 South American Youth Championship, scoring twice.

In 2012, Funes Mori made his senior debut for Argentina during a friendly match in the Superclásico de las Américas.

=== Mexico ===
Early in 2019, Funes Mori inquired FIFA about the possibility to play for Mexico, but was deemed ineligible. In 2020, following a change of rules regarding naturalized players by FIFA, he was deemed eligible to play for Mexico and restated his interest. On 14 June 2021, Funes Mori was granted his Mexican citizenship making him eligible to play for Mexico.

On 3 July 2021, he earned his first cap with the senior national team under manager Gerardo Martino in a friendly match against Nigeria, scoring on his debut in the team's 4–0 victory.

Funes Mori participated at the 2021 Gold Cup, scoring a total of 3 times. Mexico finished runner-up after losing the final to the United States 0–1.

In October 2022, Funes Mori was named in Mexico's preliminary 31-man squad for the 2022 FIFA World Cup, and in November, he was ultimately included in the final 26-man roster.

== Personal life ==
Funes Mori is married to Jorgelina, who is the sister of former FC Dallas midfielder Mauro Díaz. His twin brother, Ramiro, is also a footballer and represented the Argentina national team at two Copa América tournaments.

== Career statistics ==
=== Club ===
As of 2 December 2024

Appearances and goals by club, season and competition
Club	Season	League			National cup		League cup		Continental		Total	
Club	Season	Division	Apps	Goals	Apps	Goals	Apps	Goals	Apps	Goals	Apps	Goals
River Plate	2009–10	Argentine Primera División	19	5	—		—		—		19	5
River Plate	2010–11	Argentine Primera División	25	4	—		—		—		25	4
River Plate	2011–12	Primera B Nacional	23	4	5	2	—		—		28	6
River Plate	2012–13	Argentine Primera División	32	7	—		—		—		32	7
River Plate	2013–14	Argentine Primera División	1	0	—		—		—		1	0
River Plate	Total		100	20	5	2	0	0	0	0	105	22
Benfica	2013–14	Primeira Liga	2	0	1	0	2	0	—		5	0
Benfica B	2013–14	Liga Portugal 2	12	13	—		—		—		12	13
Eskişehirspor (loan)	2014–15	Süper Lig	29	8	7	6	—		—		36	14
Monterrey	2015–16	Liga MX	36	20	8	5	—		—		44	25
Monterrey	2016–17	Liga MX	33	15	6	7	—		2	0	41	22
Monterrey	2017–18	Liga MX	32	17	8	2	—		—		40	19
Monterrey	2018–19	Liga MX	31	16	5	2	—		7	2	43	20
Monterrey	2019–20	Liga MX	30	15	6	3	—		3	2	39	20
Monterrey	2020–21	Liga MX	34	15	—		—		6	3	40	18
Monterrey	2021–22	Liga MX	24	9	—		—		2	1	26	10
Monterrey	2022–23	Liga MX	31	18	—		—		—		31	18
Monterrey	2023–24	Liga MX	17	7	—		—		7	1	24	8
Monterrey	Total		268	132	33	19	0	0	27	9	328	160
UNAM	2023–24	Liga MX	12	1	—		—		4	1	16	2
UNAM	2024–25	Liga MX	0	0	—		0	0	—		0	0
UNAM	Total		12	1	0	0	0	0	4	1	16	2
Career total			423	174	46	27	2	0	31	10	502	211

=== International ===
As of match played 30 November 2022

Appearances and goals by national team and year
National team	Year	Apps	Goals
Mexico	2021	13	5
Mexico	2022	4	1
Total		17	6

Scores and results list Mexico's goal tally first.

No.	Date	Venue	Opponent	Score	Result	Competition
1.	3 July 2021	Los Angeles Memorial Coliseum, Los Angeles, United States	Nigeria	2–0	4–0	Friendly
2.	14 July 2021	Cotton Bowl, Dallas, United States	Guatemala	1–0	3–0	2021 CONCACAF Gold Cup
3.	14 July 2021	Cotton Bowl, Dallas, United States	Guatemala	2–0	3–0	2021 CONCACAF Gold Cup
4.	24 July 2021	State Farm Stadium, Glendale, United States	Honduras	1–0	3–0	2021 CONCACAF Gold Cup
5.	10 October 2021	Estadio Azteca, Mexico City, Mexico	Honduras	2–0	3–0	2022 FIFA World Cup qualification
6.	9 November 2022	Estadi Montilivi, Girona, Spain	Iraq	2–0	4–0	Friendly

== Honours ==
River Plate

- Primera B Nacional: 2011–12

Benfica

- Primeira Liga: 2013–14
- Taça de Portugal: 2013–14
- Taça da Liga: 2013–14

Monterrey

- Liga MX: Apertura 2019
- Copa MX: Apertura 2017, 2019–20
- CONCACAF Champions League: 2019, 2021

Individual

- Liga MX Goal of the Tournament: 2015–16, 2018–19
- Copa MX Top Scorer: Clausura 2017
- Liga MX Player of the Month: January 2019
- Liga MX Best XI: Apertura 2019
- Liga MX All-Star: 2021
- CONCACAF Gold Cup Best XI: 2021
- CONCACAF Champions League Golden Ball: 2021
- CONCACAF Champions League Team of the Tournament: 2021
- IFFHS CONCACAF Best XI: 2021 (Substitute)

Records

- Monterrey All Time Leading Goalscorer
