= Leonardo Acosta =

Uruguayan footballer (born 1977)

Personal information
- Full name: Leonardo Daniel Acosta Díaz
- Date of birth: 21 March 1977 (age 49)
- Place of birth: Montevideo, Uruguay
- Position: Striker

Team information
- Current team: Patronato de Paraná

Senior career*
Years	Team	Apps	(Gls)
2000–2001	Rampla Juniors		
2002	Alianza		
2003–2004	Deportivo Colonia		
2005–2009	Real Arroyo Seco		
2006	→ Rentistas (loan)		
2008	→ Guillermo Brown (loan)		
2009–2010	Unión de Sunchales		
2010	Central Córdoba		
2011	Guaraní Antonio Franco		
2011	Deportivo Santamarina		
2011–present	Patronato de Paraná		
- * Club domestic league appearances and goals

Leonardo Daniel Acosta Díaz (born March 21, 1977) is a Uruguayan association football forward currently playing for Patronato de Paraná of the Primera B Nacional in Argentina. He was born in Montevideo.
