= Fabián Bordagaray =

Argentine footballer

Personal information
- Date of birth: 15 February 1987 (age 39)
- Place of birth: Avellaneda, Argentina
- Height: 1.73 m (5 ft 8 in)
- Position: Forward

Team information
- Current team: Arsenal Sarandí

Youth career
- Defensa y Justicia

Senior career*
Years	Team	Apps	(Gls)
2006–2008	Defensa y Justicia	13	(2)
2008–2013	San Lorenzo	62	(8)
2011	→ River Plate (loan)	8	(1)
2011–2012	→ Argentinos Juniors (loan)	24	(4)
2013–2014	CSD Rangers	27	(4)
2014–2015	Levadiakos	8	(0)
2015–2016	Caracas	28	(3)
2016	Defensa y Justicia	16	(9)
2016–2018	Rosario Central	15	(2)
2017–2018	→ Defensa y Justicia (loan)	22	(4)
2018–2021	Defensa y Justicia	1	(0)
2019	→ Dorados (loan)	30	(12)
2020–2021	Banfield	18	(2)
2021–2023	Belgrano	48	(1)
2024	Quilmes	29	(2)
2025–	Arsenal Sarandí	13	(2)
- * Club domestic league appearances and goals as of 18:05, 4 June 2025 (UTC)

Fabián Bordagaray (born 15 February 1987) is an Argentine professional footballer who plays as a forward for Arsenal Sarandí in Primera Nacional.

== Career ==
Bordagaray started his career in 2006 with Defensa y Justicia in the Primera B Nacional (Argentine second division). In 2008, he joined San Lorenzo of the first division, where he debuted under Diego Simeone's coaching.

In January 2011, the forward left San Lorenzo and was loaned from a third-party to River Plate, where he signed an 18-month contract.

In January 2015, Bordagaray signed for Caracas FC.
