= Sueño MLS =

The Sueño MLS program was a Major League Soccer (MLS) scouting program and reality television show that gave young players the opportunity to impress MLS clubs and join their youth systems.

== Format and synopsis ==
Sueño MLS was a nationally televised player search for Major League Soccer that focused on the young Latino population in the United States. The name "Sueño MLS" is the Spanish translation of "MLS Dream". Coaches from many MLS teams selected the players. Five outfield players and one goalkeeper were usually selected in each participating city to compete for the Sueño MLS title. Eighteen finalists trained together for a few days and then played a final match against an MLS Academy Team affiliated with an MLS franchise.

== History ==
Sueño MLS held its first competition in 2007, and Jorge Flores Villafaña became the first ever winner.

In 2011, 400 tryout spots were made available on the first day, and then the list of players was narrowed down to 30 for the second day of tryouts. Five outfield players and one goalkeeper were selected from each of Chicago, Los Angeles, and Philadelphia. The 2011 competition was also the first to give an award to its top goalkeeper, a trophy titled the "Good Hands" Award.

The 2011 final was held in Dallas, Texas, where Birnis Adames became the winner of the competition, and Anthony Hall was awarded top goalkeeper.

The program ended after its 2016 iteration.

== Winners ==
=== Competition winners ===
| Year | Player | Club |
|---|---|---|
| 2007 | Jorge Flores | Chivas USA |
| 2008 | Rogelio Funes Mori | FC Dallas |
| 2008 | Briant Reyes | Chivas USA |
| 2009 | Alberto Lopez | Chicago Fire |
| 2010 | Nelson Castro | Houston Dynamo |
| 2011 | Birnis Adames | Philadelphia Union |
| 2012 | Armando Flores | Chivas USA |
| 2013 | Alexander Soto | D.C. United |
| 2014 | Johnny Echeveria | LA Galaxy |
| 2015 | Baltazar Duran | Chicago Fire |
| 2016 | Alan Gaytán | Portland Timbers |

=== "Good Hands" top goalkeeper ===
| Year | Player | Club |
|---|---|---|
| 2011 | Anthony Hall | FC Dallas |
| 2012 | Jimmy Camacho | Chivas USA |
| 2013 | Luis Aranzazu | D.C. United |
| 2014 | Manuel Steven Ortiz Ruiz | New York Red Bulls |
| 2015 | Eduardo Muñoz | Chicago Fire |
| 2016 | Charlton Alonso | New York Red Bulls |
