= Gastón Caprari =

Argentine footballer

Personal information
- Full name: Gastón Nicolás Caprari
- Date of birth: 17 February 1985 (age 41)
- Place of birth: Córdoba, Argentina
- Height: 1.80 m (5 ft 11 in)
- Position: Striker

Team information
- Current team: Magallanes
- Number: 11

Youth career
- 2003–2006: Instituto de Córdoba

Senior career*
Years	Team	Apps	(Gls)
2006–2008	Pumas Morelos	38	(12)
2008–2009	Elche	11	(1)
2009–2010	Boca Unidos	19	(4)
2010–2014	San Martín SJ	94	(26)
2014–2015	Patronato	15	(1)
2015–	Magallanes	1	(2)
- * Club domestic league appearances and goals as of 7 May 2015

Gastón Nicolás Caprari (born 17 February 1985) is an Argentine former footballer.

Born in Córdoba, Argentina and a graduate of Instituto de Córdoba's youth system, Caprari had his greatest success with San Martín de San Juan. He helped the club gain promotion to the Argentine Primera División in his first season, and would play several seasons in the top league with San Martín.
