= Martín Aguirre =

Argentine footballer and manager

Martín Sebastián Aguirre
Personal information
- Full name: Martín Sebastián Aguirre
- Date of birth: 16 January 1981 (age 45)
- Place of birth: Bahía Blanca, Argentina
- Height: 1.68 m (5 ft 6 in)
- Position: Central midfielder

Team information
- Current team: Tigre (Assistant)

Senior career*
Years	Team	Apps	(Gls)
1998–2002	Bella Vista	84	(19)
2002–2007	Villa Mitre	121	(26)
2005–2006	→ Deportivo Santamarina (loan)	12	(0)
2007–2011	Godoy Cruz	59	(8)
2010–2011	→ Olimpo (loan)	22	(2)
2011–2015	River Plate	41	(5)

Managerial career
- 2017–: Tigre (assistant)
- * Club domestic league appearances and goals

Martín Sebastián Aguirre (born 16 January 1981) is a former Argentine football central midfielder. He is currently the assistant manager of Club Atlético Tigre.

== Coaching career ==
=== Tigre ===
On 18 December 2017, Aguirre was appointed as the assistant coach of Cristian Raúl Ledesma at Club Atlético Tigre.
