= Luciano Vella =

Argentine footballer

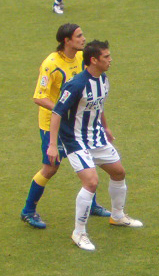

Personal information
- Full name: Luciano Germán Vella
- Date of birth: April 13, 1981 (age 45)
- Place of birth: Rosario, Santa Fe, Argentina
- Height: 1.70 m (5 ft 7 in)
- Position: Right back

Senior career*
Years	Team	Apps	(Gls)
2002–2005	Newell's Old Boys	110	(5)
2006–2008	Cádiz	48	(2)
2008	→ Vélez Sársfield (loan)	6	(0)
2008–2009	Rapid Bucharest	5	(0)
2009–2010	Independiente	30	(0)
2010–2011	Newell's Old Boys	27	(0)
2011–2012	River Plate	19	(0)
2013–2014	Unión Santa Fe	35	(0)
2014–2015	Defensa y Justicia	15	(0)
2016–2017	Arsenal de Sarandí	21	(0)
- * Club domestic league appearances and goals as of 12:32, 18 November 2017 (UTC)

Luciano Germán Vella (born April 13, 1981) is an Argentine former footballer who played as a right-back.

== Career ==
He started playing football for his home town club Newell's Old Boys. He transferred to then La Liga club Cádiz CF in January 2006. He endured a rather unsuccessful spell in Spain with Cádiz relegated after the 2005–06 season. They were then unable to bounce back the following season (finishing 5th), and with the club looking to miss promotion again half-way through the 2007–08 season, Vella returned to Argentina with Vélez Sársfield for the start of the 2008 Clausura championship. On 10 June 2010 Newell's Old Boys loaned the 29-year-old right wingback from Club Atlético Independiente.

== Honours ==
Newell's Old Boys

- Primera División: 2004 Apertura

River Plate

- Primera B Nacional: 2011–12
