= Alexis Ferrero =

Argentine footballer

Personal information
- Full name: Alexis Javier Ferrero
- Date of birth: 31 March 1979 (age 47)
- Place of birth: Calchaquí, Argentina
- Height: 1.82 m (6 ft 0 in)
- Position: Centre back

Youth career
- 1998–1999: Ferro Carril Oeste

Senior career*
Years	Team	Apps	(Gls)
2000–2003	Ferro Carril Oeste	62	(2)
2003–2005	Atlanta	31	(4)
2005–2007	Tigre	88	(2)
2008	Botafogo	4	(0)
2009	→ Colón (loan)	37	(0)
2010–2012	River Plate	63	(0)
2012–2014	Huracán	54	(0)
2014	→ Rangers (loan)	1	(0)
2016–2017	San Martín Tucumán	58	(0)
2017–2019	Central Córdoba SdE	53	(2)
2019	San Luis	11	(0)
2020	San Martín Mendoza	4	(0)
Total		466	(10)

International career
2009	Argentina	1	(0)

Managerial career
- 2020–2021: Central Córdoba SdE (interim)
- 2022: Sportivo Las Parejas
- 2023: San Martín Tucumán (interim)
- 2024: San Martín Mendoza
- * Club domestic league appearances and goals

Alexis Javier Ferrero (born 31 March 1979) is an Argentine former football centre back.

== Club career ==
Ferrero started his professional career with Ferro Carril Oeste. He played for the team in the lower leagues of Argentine football until 2003 when he joined Atlanta of the Primera B Metropolitana (third division).

In 2005, Ferrero joined Tigre, helping the team to gain promotion to the Argentine Primera in 2007. The 2007 Apertura was Tigre's first season in the Primera since 1980. Ferrero played in all 19 games, helping the club to finish in second place, the highest league finish in their history.

For 2008, Ferrero moved to Brazilian side Botafogo. However, he returned to Argentina on January 11, 2009, when he was loaned to Colón.

In January 2010 Ferrero joined River Plate.

== International career ==
On 20 May 2009, Ferrero played for Argentina in a friendly match against Panama, forming part of a squad made from players based in the Argentine league. Argentina won the game 3–1.
