= Facundo Affranchino =

Argentine footballer

Personal information
- Full name: Facundo Andrés Affranchino
- Date of birth: February 9, 1990 (age 36)
- Place of birth: Paraná, Entre Ríos, Argentina
- Height: 1.80 m (5 ft 11 in)
- Position: Right winger

Youth career
- River Plate

Senior career*
Years	Team	Apps	(Gls)
2007–2015	River Plate	37	(2)
2012	→ San Martín (loan)	17	(1)
2013	→ San Martín (loan)	18	(0)
2013–2014	→ Belgrano (loan)	17	(0)
2015	Lobos BUAP	4	(0)
2015	Unión de Santa Fe	9	(0)
2016–2018	Ferro Carril Oeste	58	(4)
2018–2019	Instituto	21	(1)
2019	Villa Dálmine	9	(0)
2020	Olmedo	0	(0)
2020–2024	Olimpo	104	(6)
2025	Atlético Rafaela	31	(3)
- * Club domestic league appearances and goals as of 17:08, 6 December 2025 (UTC)

Facundo Andrés Affranchino (born 9 February 1990) is an Argentine footballer.

== Career ==
Affranchino made his debut as a 16-year-old on November 10, 2007, in a River Plate's 2–1 away loss to Huracán where he played 81 minutes as a right winger.

Affranchino was part of the squad that won the Clausura 2008 tournament, but he did not actually feature in any of the games.

In the 2010 Clausura, Affranchino entered and scored his first goal for River against San Lorenzo, giving River a 1–0.

In the 2010 Apertura, he scored his second goal for the club against Huracan in the second round. River won the match 1-0 thanks to his goal.
