= Luciano Abecasis =

Argentine footballer

Personal information
- Full name: Luciano Andrés Abecasis
- Date of birth: 4 June 1990 (age 36)
- Place of birth: Rosario, Argentina
- Height: 1.75 m (5 ft 9 in)
- Position: Right-back

Youth career
- 2005–2010: Rosario Central

Senior career*
Years	Team	Apps	(Gls)
2010–2015	River Plate	25	(0)
2013–2014	→ Quilmes (loan)	20	(1)
2015	→ Pescara (loan)	3	(0)
2016–2019	Godoy Cruz	76	(1)
2019–2020	Lanús	1	(0)
2020	Club Libertad	10	(0)
2021	San Jose Earthquakes	23	(0)
2022–2023	Banfield	20	(0)
2023–2025	Independiente Rivadavia	57	(2)
Total		235	(4)
- * Club domestic league appearances and goals as of (UTC)

Luciano Andrés Abecasis (born 4 June 1990) is an Argentine former professional footballer who played as a right-back.

During the 2021 season, he played for the San Jose Earthquakes, who later declined their contract option on Abecasis for 2022.

== Honours ==
Independiente Rivadavia

- Primera Nacional: 2023
- Copa Argentina: 2025
