= Walter Acevedo =

Argentine footballer (born 1986)

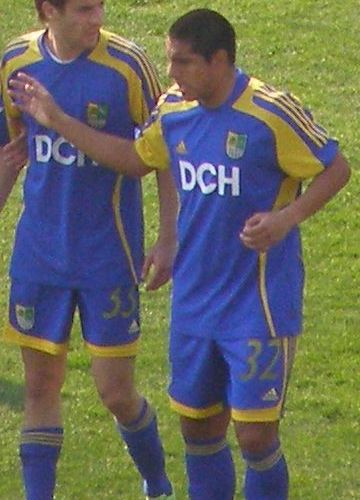

Personal information
- Full name: Walter Aníbal Acevedo
- Date of birth: February 16, 1986 (age 40)
- Place of birth: San Justo, Argentina
- Height: 1.74 m (5 ft 9 in)
- Position: Centre midfielder

Youth career
- San Lorenzo

Senior career*
Years	Team	Apps	(Gls)
2005–2009	San Lorenzo	54	(1)
2009–2010	FC Metalist Kharkiv	12	(1)
2009–2010	→ Independiente (loan)	32	(1)
2010–2014	River Plate	26	(0)
2011–2012	→ Banfield (loan)	23	(0)
2013–2014	→ Zaragoza (loan)	18	(1)
2014–2015	CA Tigre	6	(0)
2015	Defensa y Justicia	9	(0)
2016–2017	All Boys	21	(1)
2017–2018	Birkirkara	2	(0)
2018	Municipal	14	(0)

International career
2003	Argentina U-17	5	(0)
2006	Argentina U-20	3	(0)
2010	Argentina	1	(0)
- * Club domestic league appearances and goals as of March 3, 2019

Walter Aníbal Acevedo (born February 16, 1986) is an Argentine former professional footballer who played as a midfielder.

== Career ==
Acevedo has played for San Lorenzo since 2005, in 2007 he helped the club to win the Clausura tournament. In January 2009, he was signed by FC Metalist Kharkiv but was not important in the team because he did not adapt well to his surroundings in a country that was not his own. On July 3, 2009 Independiente signed the center midfielder on loan from Ukrainian club Metalist Kharkov until December 2009 because of his inability to adapt and his strong desire to return to Argentina. In July 2012, Acevedo was in talks with Colo Colo to play in Chile, but River Plate wanted to retain him for the Apertura.

Acevedo joined Municipal in June 2018, before leaving the club again at the end of the year.

== International career ==
Acevedo has represented the Argentina national team at Under-17 and under-20 levels. He made his full international debut for the Argentina national team after being called up to join Diego Maradona's squad of Argentina-based players who beat Jamaica 2–1 on February 10, 2010.

== Honours ==
San Lorenzo

- Argentine Primera División: Clausura 2007
