= Agustín Alayes =

Argentine footballer

Personal information
- Full name: Agustín Alayes
- Date of birth: July 22, 1978 (age 48)
- Place of birth: La Plata, Argentina
- Height: 1.89 m (6 ft 2 in)
- Position: Centre back

Youth career
- Estudiantes

Senior career*
Years	Team	Apps	(Gls)
1997–2000	Estudiantes	58	(1)
2000–2005	Quilmes	134	(22)
2005–2009	Estudiantes	125	(11)
2010	Newell's Old Boys	34	(1)
2011	Colo-Colo	2	(0)
2011	River Plate	6	(0)
2012	Banfield	15	(1)
2012	Estudiantes	3	(0)
Total		377	(35)
- * Club domestic league appearances and goals

Agustín Alayes (born 22 July 1978 in La Plata) is a retired Argentine footballer who played as defender.

== Career ==
Alayes started his career at Estudiantes in 1997 but in 2000 he left his home town club to play for Quilmes Atlético Club in 2000. Five years later he returned to Estudiantes.

His first significant achievement was helping Estudiantes become Apertura 2006 champions. He played in the 2–1 victory over Boca Juniors on 13 December 2006, in the deciding match for the title of Apertura 2006 champions.

Alayes scored five goals, noted for their importance in securing important wins, and for being mostly full-thrust headers. Sports diary Olé compared him to Estudiantes legend José Luis Brown. He was part of the team that won the 2009 Copa Libertadores, but was seriously injured during the tournament and could not play the semifinal and final games.

Later, Estudiantes let him go as a free agent. He played for Newell's Old Boys in 2010, Colo-Colo in the first semester of 2011, River Plate in the second semester of 2011, after River was relegated to second division, and in Banfield in the first semester of 2012. After being relegated to second division with Banfield, Alayes returned to Estudiantes for the 2012–2013 season.

While playing for Colo-Colo he was the highest paid player in the Chilean football along with his teammate Andrés Scotti. But, his stay in Colo-Colo was not successful and the club released him at the end of the semester, costing Colo-Colo the sum of $70 million pesos (US$149,000).

== Honours ==
Estudiantes de La Plata

- Primera División: 2006 Apertura
- Copa Libertadores: 2009
