= Juan Manuel Díaz =

Uruguayan footballer (born 1987)

Juan Díaz Martínez
Personal information
- Full name: Juan Manuel Díaz Martínez
- Date of birth: 28 October 1987 (age 39)
- Place of birth: Montevideo, Uruguay
- Height: 1.81 m (5 ft 11 in)
- Position: Left back

Youth career
- 2003–2005: Racing

Senior career*
Years	Team	Apps	(Gls)
2006–2008	Liverpool FC	23	(3)
2008–2010	Estudiantes	65	(1)
2010–2012	River Plate	54	(2)
2012–2016	Nacional	89	(9)
2016	Racing	20	(3)
2016–2017	AEK Athens	1	(0)

International career
2007–2009	Uruguay U20	4	(0)
- * Club domestic league appearances and goals

Juan Manuel Díaz Martínez (born 28 October 1987) is an Uruguayan former footballer.

== Career ==
Díaz was signed by Estudiantes de La Plata in January 2008. He made his debut 2–1 win over against Banfield on February 8, 2008. He scored his first Estudiantes goal against Rosario Central on 25 April 2008. He was sent off against LDU Quito on April 29, 2008.

During the 2008–09 season, Díaz was part of the Estudiantes squad that experienced finishing as runners up in Copa Sudamericana 2008 and then went on to win Copa Libertadores 2009. In January 2010, Club Atlético River Plate signed the Uruguayan wingback from Estudiantes.

In July 2010, Nacional made public his interest on the left wingback.

On 8 July 2016, Diaz signed a two-year contract with Super League club AEK Athens for an undisclosed fee. He was released by mutual consent in March 2017.

== International career ==
Díaz also capped for Uruguay U20 at 2007 South American Youth Championship and 2007 FIFA U-20 World Cup.

On July 27, 2010 he was reserved to play a friendly match with Uruguay first team against Angola in Lisbon .

== Honours ==
Estudiantes de La Plata

- Copa Libertadores: 2009
