= Cristian Ledesma (footballer, born 1978) =

Argentine footballer

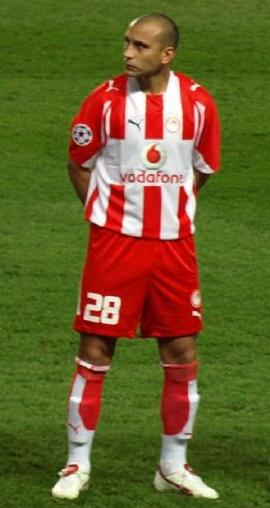
- Ledesma with Olympiacos in 2008

Personal information
- Full name: Cristian Raúl Ledesma
- Date of birth: 29 December 1978 (age 47)
- Place of birth: San Isidro, Argentina
- Height: 1.78 m (5 ft 10 in)
- Position: Defensive midfielder

Team information
- Current team: Inter Miami II

Senior career*
Years	Team	Apps	(Gls)
1997–1999	Argentinos Juniors	54	(0)
1999–2002	River Plate	43	(0)
2002–2003	Hamburger SV	16	(0)
2003	Monterrey	16	(0)
2004	Colón	17	(0)
2004–2005	River Plate	23	(0)
2005	Racing Club	5	(0)
2006	Argentinos Juniors	34	(2)
2007	San Lorenzo	17	(1)
2007–2010	Olympiacos	35	(0)
2008–2009	→ San Lorenzo (loan)	34	(2)
2010–2011	Colón	23	(0)
2011–2014	River Plate	45	(1)
2014–2016	Argentinos Juniors	30	(0)
Total		392	(6)

International career
2007–2008	Argentina	4	(0)

Managerial career
- 2017–2018: Tigre
- 2022–2024: Inter Miami II (assistant)
- 2025–: Inter Miami II
- * Club domestic league appearances and goals

Cristian Raúl Ledesma (born 29 December 1978 in San Isidro) is a former Argentine footballer who played as a midfielder. He is nicknamed Lobo ("Wolf"). He is currently the head coach for MLS Next Pro club Inter Miami II.

== Playing career ==
=== Club ===
Ledesma began his professional footballing career with Argentinos Juniors in 1997. He then played for River Plate, Hamburger SV in Germany, Monterrey in Mexico, Colón and Racing Club.

After winning the Argentinian league with San Lorenzo, Ledesma was signed by the Greek champions Olympiacos, for roughly €1,800,000 giving him an opportunity to play in the Greek league and the UEFA Champions League. After one year with Olympiacos, he was loaned back to San Lorenzo for one season in August 2008.

On 13 July 2010, Ledesma returned to Colón on a free transfer.

=== International ===
He made his national team debut against Chile, 19 April 2007. He was called up to a friendly against Norway on 22 August 2007 but did not appear. He made his second appearance for Argentina against Australia on 11 September. He made his final national team appearances in qualifying for the 2010 FIFA World Cup against Uruguay 11 October 2008 and against Chile 16 October 2008.

== Coaching career ==
=== Tigre ===
On 18 December 2017, Ledesma was appointed as the head coach of Club Atlético Tigre. He served until 24 September 2018.

=== Inter Miami ===
Ledesma served as an assistant in the Inter Miami CF academy for the 2022 season and as an assistant for Inter Miami II in 2023 and 2024. He was appointed head coach of Inter Miami II ahead of the 2025 season.

== Honours ==
=== Club ===
River Plate

- Argentine Primera División: Apertura 1999, Clausura 2000, Clausura 2002, Final 2013–14

Hamburger SV

- DFB-Ligapokal: 2003

San Lorenzo

- Argentine Primera División: Clausura 2007

Olympiacos

- Super League Greece: 2007–08
- Greek Football Cup: 2007–08
- Greek Super Cup: 2007
