= 2013–14 Copa Argentina =

Tournament details
- Country: Argentina
- Teams: 261

Final positions
- Champions: Huracán (1st title)
- Runners-up: Rosario Central
- 2015 Copa Libertadores: Huracán

Tournament statistics
- Matches played: 257
- Goals scored: 628 (2.44 per match)
- Top goal scorer(s): Mariano Gorosito; Walter Ibáñez (5 goals)

The 2013–14 Copa Argentina was the fifth edition of the Copa Argentina, and the third since the relaunch of the tournament in 2011. The competition began on October 29, 2013. Arsenal was the defending champion, but were eliminated by Instituto in the Round of 32. Huracán won the final and their first title, beating Rosario Central on penalties. By winning the competition, Huracán won the right to play the 2015 Copa Libertadores, and the 2014 Supercopa Argentina.

== Teams ==
Two hundred and sixty-one teams will take part in this competition. All the teams from the Primera División (20), Primera B Nacional (22), Primera B Metropolitana (21), Torneo Argentino A (24), Primera C (20), Torneo Argentino B (136), and Primera D (18).

Teams in bold are still in competition

=== Primera División ===
- All Boys
- Argentinos Juniors
- Arsenal (defending champions)
- Atlético de Rafaela
- Belgrano
- Boca Juniors
- Colón
- Estudiantes (LP)
- Gimnasia y Esgrima (LP)
- Godoy Cruz
- Lanús
- Newell's Old Boys
- Olimpo
- Quilmes
- Racing
- River Plate
- Rosario Central
- San Lorenzo
- Tigre
- Vélez Sársfield

=== Primera B Nacional ===
- Aldosivi
- Almirante Brown
- Atlético Tucumán
- Banfield
- Boca Unidos
- Brown
- Crucero del Norte
- Defensa y Justicia
- Douglas Haig
- Ferro Carril Oeste
- Gimnasia y Esgrima (J)
- **Huracán**
- Independiente
- Independiente Rivadavia
- Instituto
- Patronato
- San Martín (SJ)
- Sarmiento (J)
- Sportivo Belgrano
- Talleres (C)
- Unión
- Villa San Carlos

=== Primera B Metropolitana ===
- Acassuso
- Almagro
- Atlanta
- Barracas Central
- Chacarita Juniors
- Colegiales
- Comunicaciones
- Defensores de Belgrano
- Deportivo Armenio
- Deportivo Merlo
- Deportivo Morón
- Estudiantes (BA)
- Fénix
- Flandria
- Los Andes
- Nueva Chicago
- Platense
- Temperley
- Tristán Suárez
- UAI Urquiza
- Villa Dálmine

=== Torneo Argentino A ===
- Alvarado
- Central Córdoba (SdE)
- Central Norte
- Chaco For Ever
- Cipolletti
- CAI
- Defensores de Belgrano (VR)
- Deportivo Maipú
- Estudiantes (SL)
- Gimnasia y Esgrima (CdU)
- Gimnasia y Tiro
- Guaraní Antonio Franco
- Guillermo Brown
- Juventud Antoniana
- Juventud Unida (G)
- Juventud Unida Universitario
- Libertad (S)
- Racing (O)
- Rivadavia (L)
- San Jorge (T)
- San Martín (T)
- Santamarina
- Tiro Federal
- Unión (MdP)

=== Primera C ===
- Argentino (M)
- Argentino (Q)
- Berazategui
- Central Córdoba (R)
- Defensores de Cambaceres
- Defensores Unidos
- Deportivo Español
- Dock Sud
- Excursionistas
- Ferrocarril Midland
- General Lamadrid
- Ituzaingó
- J. J. de Urquiza
- Laferrere
- Liniers
- Luján
- Sacachispas
- San Telmo
- Sportivo Italiano
- Talleres (RE)

=== Torneo Argentino B ===
- 9 de Julio (M)
- 9 de Julio (R)
- 25 de Mayo (LP)
- Agropecuario
- Alianza (CM)
- Alianza (CC)
- Alumni (VM)
- Altos Hornos Zapla
- América (GP)
- Andes FBC
- Aprendices Casildenses
- Argentino Peñarol
- Argentino Quilmes (R)
- Argentinos (VdM)
- Atenas (P)
- Atlético Adelante
- Atlético Amalia
- Atlético Argentino (M)
- Atlético Camioneros
- Atlético Chicoana
- Atlético Concepción (T)
- Atlético Laguna Blanca
- Atlético Palmira
- Atlético Paraná
- Atlético Policial (C)
- Atlético Regina
- Bella Vista (BB)
- Belgrano (E)
- Belgrano (P)
- Belgrano (Z)
- Ben Hur
- Boca (RG)
- Camioneros Argentinos
- CEC (Mdza)
- Central Goya
- Círculo Italiano
- Colegiales (C)
- Concepción FC
- Coronel Aguirre
- Defensores de Buena Parada
- Defensores de La Boca (LR)
- Defensores de Salto
- Deportivo Achirense
- Deportivo Aguilares
- Deportivo Curupay
- Deportivo Fontana
- Deportivo Guaymallén
- Deportivo Lastenia
- Deportivo Madryn
- Deportivo Montecaseros
- Deportivo Patagones
- Deportivo Río Dorado
- Deportivo Roca
- Deportivo Tabacal
- Desamparados (SJ)
- Estudiantes (RC)
- Estudiantes Unidos
- Everton
- Ex Alumnos Escuela N°185
- FC Tres Algarrobos
- Ferro Carril Oeste (GP)
- Ferro Carril Sud
- Ferroviario (C)
- General Paz Juniors
- General Rojo
- Germinal
- Gimnasia y Esgrima (Mza)
- Gutiérrez
- Herminio Arrieta
- Huracán (CR)
- Huracán de Goya
- Huracán (SR)
- Independiente (C)
- Independiente (F)
- Independiente (LR)
- Independiente (N)
- Independiente (RC)
- Independiente de Villa Obrera
- Instituto Santiago
- Jorge Newbery (J)
- Jorge Newbery (VM)
- Jorge Newbery (VT)
- Jorge Ross
- Juventud (P)
- Juventud Alianza
- Kimberley
- Las Palmas
- Leonardo Murialdo
- Libertad (S)
- Liniers (BB)
- Mitre (S)
- Mitre (SdE)
- Monterrico San Vicente
- Náutico Hacoaj
- Once Tigres
- Petrolero Argentino
- Petrolero Austral
- Progreso (RdlF)
- Racing (C)
- Racing (T)
- Resistencia Central
- San Jorge (SF)
- San Lorenzo (A)
- San Martín (F)
- San Martín (M)
- San Martín (MC)
- Sanjustino
- Sarmiento (A)
- Sarmiento (L)
- Sarmiento (R)
- Sarmiento (SdE)
- Sol de América (F)
- Sol de Mayo
- Sport Club Pacífico
- Sportivo Barracas (C)
- Sportivo Del Bono
- Sportivo Fernández
- Sportivo Las Parejas
- Sportivo Patria
- Sportivo Rivadavia (VT)
- Sports (S)
- Talleres (P)
- Textil Mandiyú
- Tiro Federal (BB)
- Tiro Federal (M)
- Tiro y Gimnasia (J)
- Trinidad
- Unión Aconquija
- Unión (S)
- Unión (VK)
- Unión Güemes
- Unión Santiago
- Viale FBC
- Villa Congreso
- Villa Cubas (C)
- Villa Mitre

=== Primera D ===
- Argentino (R)
- Atlas
- Cañuelas
- Central Ballester
- Centro Español
- Claypole
- Deportivo Paraguayo
- Deportivo Riestra
- El Porvenir
- Juventud Unida
- Leandro N. Alem
- Lugano
- Muñiz
- San Martín (B)
- San Miguel
- Sportivo Barracas
- Victoriano Arenas
- Yupanqui

== Regional Preliminary Round ==
This round is organized by the Consejo Federal.

=== Regional Preliminary Round I ===
In this round, 80 teams from the Torneo Argentino B participated. The round was contested between October 29 and November 6, in a single match knock-out format. The 40 winning teams advanced to the next round.

| October 30, 2013 | Sarmiento (A) | 3–0 | América (GP) | Ayacucho, Pcia. de Buenos Aires |
| | Insaurralde 4'; Olushola 37'; Blanco 77' | | | Stadium: Municipal de Ayacucho; Referee: Sebastián Málaga |

| October 30, 2013 | Atlético Camioneros | 2–1 | Jorge Newbery (J) | Jáuregui, Pcia. de Buenos Aires |
| | Jara 30'; Reynoso 56' | | Quinteros 13' | Stadium: Carlos V Referee: Lucas Gómez |

| October 30, 2013 | Independiente (C) | 0–0 (6–5 p) | General Rojo | Chivilcoy, Pcia. de Buenos Aires |
| | | | | Stadium: Raúl Orlando Lungarzo; Referee: Guillermo Farina |

| October 30, 2013 | Juventud (P) | 3–0 | Belgrano (Z) | Pergamino, Pcia. de Buenos Aires |
| | Illoa 12'; Carreño 56'; Ramos 80' | | | Stadium: Carlos Grondona; Referee: Darío López |

| October 29, 2013 | Sportivo Las Parejas | 2–2 (4–3 p) | Sportivo Barracas (C) | Las Parejas, Pcia. de Santa Fe |
| | Aguirre 52'; Maldonado 59' | | Palavecino 11'; Montero 45' | Stadium: Sportivo Las Parejas; Referee: Daniel González |

| October 30, 2013 | Defensores de Salto | 0–1 | Sports (S) | Salto, Pcia. de Buenos Aires |
| | | | Alessandro 22' | Stadium: Carlos Testa; Referee: Rodrigo Barra |

| October 30, 2013 | Everton | 2–2 (5–4 p) | Náutico Hacoaj | La Plata, Pcia. de Buenos Aires |
| | Esteche 16'; Ferretti 83' | | Scardino 28'; Goldin 53' | Stadium: Predio Oscar "Pachi" Funes; Referee: Martín Zabaljauregui |

| October 30, 2013 | FC Tres Algarrobos | 2–1 | Argentinos (VdM) | Tres Algarrobos, Pcia. de Buenos Aires |
| | Palomeque 72'; Santos 83' | | Philippe 68' | Stadium: Pedro Tártara; Referee: Iván Ramonda |

| October 29, 2013 | Independiente (RC) | 2–1 | Defensores (BP) | Río Colorado, Pcia. de Río Negro |
| | Coímbra 21'; Garrido 50' | | Izaguirre 11' | Stadium: Antonio López Belsagui; Referee: Favio López |

| October 30, 2013 | 25 de Mayo (LP) | 2–2 (4-3 p) | Atlético Regina | 25 de Mayo, Pcia. de La Pampa |
| | Morán 57'; González 90+4' | | Giménez 29'; Stuardo 32' | Stadium: Polideportivo 25 de Mayo; Referee: Paolo Macchi |

| October 30, 2013 | Deportivo Roca | 3–1 | Círculo Italiano | General Roca, Pcia. de Río Negro |
| | Perassi 76' 90+5'; Carrasco 82' | | Sosa 65' | Stadium: Luis Maiolino; Referee: Pedro Cofré |

| Estudiantes Unidos | Belgrano (E) |

| October 30, 2013 | Alianza (CC) | 3–0 | Petrolero Argentino | Cutral Có, Pcia. de Neuquén |
| | Cisneros 11'; Cirillo 68'; Panei 81' | | | Stadium: El Coloso del Ruca Quimey; Referee: Julián Garmendia |

| October 30, 2013 | Boca Río Gallegos | 3–2 | Petrolero Austral | Río Gallegos, Pcia. de Santa Cruz |
| | Paniagua 45+4'; Aguilera 55'; Canario 69' | | Figueras 42'; Borques 46' | Stadium: Nido de las Aguilas; Referee: Walter Calvo |

| October 29, 2013 | Deportivo Patagones | 0–2 | Villa Congreso | Carmen de Patagones, Pcia. de Buenos Aires |
| | Figueredo 48' | | Arias 84'; Mieville 88' | Stadium: Deportivo Patagones; Referee: Walter Guzmán |

| October 30, 2013 | San Martín (MC) | 1–1 (4–5 p) | Andes FBC | Monte Comán, Pcia. de Mendoza |
| | Morán 51' | | Quintana 90+3' | Stadium: Ovidio Bernués; Referee: Carlos Gil |

| October 30, 2013 | CEC (Mdza.) | 1–1 (4–5 p) | Atlético Argentino (M) | Guaymallén, Pcia. de Mendoza |
| | González 41' | | Lobardo 45+3' | Stadium: Leonardo Murialdo; Referee: Mauricio Sosa |

| October 30, 2013 | Gutiérrez | 1–0 | Leonardo Murialdo | General Gutiérrez, Pcia. de Mendoza |
| | Abba 47' | | | Stadium: General Gutiérrez; Referee: Federico Fernández |

| October 30, 2013 | Deportivo Montecaseros | 0–0 (13–14 p) | Atlético Palmira | Montecaseros, Pcia. de Mendoza |
| | | | | Stadium: Montecaseros; Referee: Mauricio Sosa |

| November 6, 2013 | Independiente (VO) | 1–3 | Atenas (P) | San Juan, Pcia. de San Juan |
| | Delgado 42' | | Tobares 24'; Da Silva 64'; Castro 87' | Stadium: Bicentenario; Referee: Alberto Rivero |

| November 6, 2013 | Juventud Alianza | 2–1 | Sportivo Del Bono | Santa Lucía, Pcia. de San Juan |
| | Alaniz 34'; Ceballos 37' | | Cejas 6' | Stadium: Centenario; Referee: Sebastián Fernández |

| November 1, 2013 | Jorge Newbery (VM) | 3–0 | Alianza (CM) | Villa Mercedes, Pcia. de San Luis |
| | Machuca 23' 49'; Chirino 37' | | | Stadium: Osvaldo Centioni; Referee: Juan Gallardo |

| October 30, 2013 | Independiente (LR) | 1–1 (4–5 p) | Defensores de La Boca (LR) | La Rioja, Pcia. de La Rioja |
| | Britos 55' | | Córdoba 60' | Stadium: Carlos Augusto Mercado Luna; Referee: Darío Reinoso |

| October 30, 2013 | Instituto Santiago | 1–1 (3–4 p) | Sportivo Fernández | Stgo. del Estero, Pcia. de Stgo. del Estero |
| | Paz 33' | | De Marcos 71' | Stadium: Raúl Ceijas; Referee: Guillermo Infante |

| October 30, 2013 | Atlético Paraná | 0–1 | Atlético Adelante | Paraná, Pcia. de Entre Ríos |
| | | | Boniardi 28' | Stadium: Pedro Mutio; Referee: Andrés Berreta |

| October 30, 2013 | Atlético Amalia | 0–0 (2–3 p) | Deportivo Lastenia | San Miguel de Tucumán, Pcia. de Tucumán |
| | | | | Stadium: Senador Luis Cruz; Referee: Sebastián Barrionuevo |

| November 6, 2013 | Mitre (S) | 2–1 | Unión Güemes | Salta, Pcia. de Salta |
| | Navarro 88'; Alfaro 90+1' | | Correa 44' | Stadium: Miguel Pascual Soler; Referee: Osvaldo Casasola |

| October 30, 2013 | Camioneros Argentinos | 0–1 | Libertad (S) | Salta, Pcia. de Salta |
| | | | Pastrana 21' | Stadium: Liga Salteña; Referee: Juan Carlos Moya |

| October 30, 2013 | Atlético Chicoana | 1–2 | Progreso (RdlF) | Chicoana, Pcia. de Salta |
| | Cortez 34' | | García 54'; Gutiérrez 77' | Stadium: Roberto Robles; Referee: Juan Carlos Moya |

| October 30, 2013 | Deportivo Río Dorado | 1–1 (3–4 p) | Deportivo Tabacal | Apolinario Saravia, Pcia. de Salta |
| | Ramadan 57' | | Fernández 88' | Stadium: Complejo Deportivo Municipal; Referee: Enzo Ramírez |

| October 30, 2013 | Tiro y Gimnasia (J) | 2–2 (1–3 p) | Herminio Arrieta | San Pedro, Pcia. de Jujuy |
| | Reta 33'; Guzmán 81' | | Villa 40'; Segovia 60' | Stadium: Tiro y Gimnasia; Referee: Emilio Chocobar |

| October 30, 2013 | Las Palmas | 2–0 | Argentino Peñarol | Córdoba, Pcia. de Córdoba |
| | Orellana 19'; Gotti 21' | | | Stadium: Las Palmas; Referee: César Ceballo |

| October 30, 2013 | Jorge Ross | 1–2 | Argentino Quilmes (R) | La Carlota, Pcia. de Córdoba |
| | Delgado 30' | | Boiero 12' 59' | Stadium: El Puente; Referee: César Ceballo |

| October 30, 2013 | Aprendices Casildenses | 3–1 | Coronel Aguirre | Casilda, Pcia. de Santa Fe |
| | Villa 14'; Villán 55'; Marisi 67' | | Camafreita 26' | Stadium: Nuevo Fortín de Nueva Roma; Referee: Rubén González |

| October 30, 2013 | Resistencia Central | 1–0 | Deportivo Fontana | Resistencia, Pcia. de Chaco |
| | Echeverri 45+1' | | | Stadium: Resistencia Central; Referee: Milton Van Lierde |

| October 30, 2013 | Deportivo Curupay | 4–3 | Ferroviario (C) | Corrientes, Pcia. de Corrientes |
| | Mondragón 26' 45' 64'; Benítez 28' (o.g.) | | Ferreira 32'; Aguirre 53'; Morales 67' | Stadium: José Antonio Romero Feris; Referee: Javier Magnago |

| October 30, 2013 | Central Goya | 1–1 (3–4 p) | Ex Alumnos Escuela N°185 | Goya, Pcia. de Corrientes |
| | Valenzuela 76' | | Liesenfeld 26' | Stadium: Pedro Celestino López; Referee: Gustavo Muchutti |

| October 30, 2013 | Atlético Laguna Blanca | 1–1 (5–4 p) | Independiente (F) | Laguna Blanca, Pcia. de Formosa |
| | Pérez 61' | | Caballero 52' | Stadium: Atlético Laguna Blanca; Referee: Adrián Mesa |

| October 30, 2013 | Colegiales (C) | 1–1 (5–3 p) | Deportivo Achirense | Concordia, Pcia. de Entre Ríos |
| | Ramírez 24' | | Soto 84' | Stadium: Libertad de Concordia; Referee: Daniel Pedreira |

| October 30, 2013 | Viale FBC | 1–1 (4–1 p) | Belgrano (P) | Viale, Pcia. de Entre Ríos |
| | Alzugaray 61' | | Sabadía 79' | Stadium: Leandro Cecotti; Referee: Mariano González |

=== Regional Preliminary Round II ===
This round is contested by the 40 qualified teams from the Regional Preliminary Round I and the remaining 56 teams from the Torneo Argentino B. It will be played between November 12 and November 20, in a single match knock-out format. The 48 winning teams will advance to the next round.

| November 13, 2013 | Ferro Carril Sud | 0–0 (3–0 p) | Independiente (C) | Olavarría, Pcia. de Buenos Aires |
| | | | | Stadium: Domingo Colasurdo; Referee: Lucas Novelli |

| November 13, 2013 | Once Tigres | 0–1 | Atlético Camioneros | Nueve de Julio, Pcia. de Buenos Aires |
| | | | Machado 16' | Stadium: Abel del Fabro; Referee: Nicolás Mattocio |

| November 13, 2013 | Jorge Newbery (VT) | 0–1 | Sportivo Rivadavia (VT) | Venado Tuerto, Pcia. de Santa Fe |
| | | | Rotondo 61' | Stadium: Vicente Ferretti; Referee: Mario Collado |

| November 13, 2013 | Sportivo Las Parejas | 1–1 (5–6 p) | Juventud (P) | Las Parejas, Pcia. de Santa Fe |
| | Abadie 8' | | Murillo 41' | Stadium: Sportivo Las Parejas; Referee: Carlos Gariano |

| November 13, 2013 | Sports (S) | 0–0 (4–2 p) | Everton | Salto, Pcia. de Buenos Aires |
| | | | | Stadium: Esteban Chiari; Referee: Alejo Cid |

| November 12, 2013 | Kimberley | 2–2 (2–3 p) | Sarmiento (A) | Mar del Plata, Pcia. de Buenos Aires |
| | Cardellino 54'; Baquero 77' (o.g.) | | Sosa 23'; Sendra 90+5' | Stadium: José María Minella; Referee: Marcelo Cendra |

| November 13, 2013 | Ferro Carril Oeste (GP) | 3–0 | Independiente (RC) | General Pico, Pcia. de La Pampa |
| | Hermida 12'; Ragusa 20'; Barzola 77' | | | Stadium: El Coloso de Barrio Talleres; Referee: Javier Sánchez |

| November 13, 2013 | FC Tres Algarrobos | 2–1 | Agropecuario | Tres Algarrobos, Pcia. de Buenos Aires |
| | Millares 38'; Bornes 76' | | Domingo 41' | Stadium: Pedro Tártara; Referee: Iván Ramonda |

| November 13, 2013 | Deportivo Roca | 5–0 | 25 de Mayo (LP) | General Roca, Pcia. de Río Negro |
| | Perassi 32'; A.Fernández 51'; F.Fernández 76'; Pinto Aparicio 81'; Valenzuela 89' | | | Stadium: Luis Maiolino; Referee: Alberto Torrecilla |

| Deportivo Madryn | Belgrano (E) |

| November 13, 2013 | Racing (T) | 2–1 | Germinal | Trelew, Pcia. de Chubut |
| | Azurmendi 15'; Hernández 87' | | Verón 10' | Stadium: Cayetano Castro; Referee: Bruno Martínez |

| November 13, 2013 | Huracán (CR) | 1–3 | Boca Río Gallegos | Comodoro Rivadavia, Pcia. de Chubut |
| | Rodríguez 74' | | Canario 16'; Ríos 80'; Paniagua 90+2' | Stadium: César Muñoz; Referee: Daniel Montero |

| November 13, 2013 | Independiente (N) | 2–1 | Alianza (CC) | Neuquén, Pcia. de Neuquén |
| | Lucero 9'; Soto 50' | | Stefanelli 89' | Stadium: La Caldera; Referee: Javier Obreque |

| November 13, 2013 | Sol de Mayo | 2–3 | Villa Congreso | Viedma, Pcia. de Río Negro |
| | Olivera 10'; Quintupray 79' | | Faúndez 19'; Sanz 38'; Pacheco 78' | Stadium: Sol de Mayo |

| November 13, 2013 | Liniers (BB) | 3–0 | Tiro Federal (BB) | Bahía Blanca, Pcia. de Buenos Aires |
| | Acosta 14' 68'; Mc Coubrey 33' | | | Stadium: Alejandro Pérez; Referee: Leonardo Villamil |

| November 13, 2013 | Villa Mitre | 5–1 | Bella Vista (BB) | Bahía Blanca, Pcia. de Buenos Aires |
| | Carrillo 12' 27' 35'; Aguilera 85'; Marinucci 89' | | Rosas 46' | Stadium: El Fortín; Referee: Daniel Ramundo |

| November 13, 2013 | SC Pacífico | 0–0 (4–2 p) | Andes FBC | General Alvear, Pcia. de Mendoza |
| | | | | Stadium: El Coliseo Alvearense; Referee: Federico Fernández |

| November 14, 2013 | Gimnasia y Esgrima (Mza) | 1–0 | Atlético Argentino (M) | Mendoza, Pcia. de Mendoza |
| | Vuanello 58' | | | Stadium: Victor Antonio Legrotaglie; Referee: Fabricio Andino |

| November 13, 2013 | San Martín (M) | 2–1 | Gutiérrez | San Martín, Pcia. de Mendoza |
| | Suraci 2' 52' | | Riquero 21' | Stadium: Libertador General San Martín; Referee: Germán Malovini |

| November 13, 2013 | Huracán (SR) | 4–1 | Atlético Palmira | San Rafael, Pcia. de Mendoza |
| | Paparone 21'; Franco 39'; Carrizo 75'; Villalba 79' | | Dalpogetto 33' | Stadium: Pretel Hermanos; Referee: Nelson Blanco |

| November 13, 2013 | Atenas (P) | 1–1 (3–5 p) | Unión (VK) | San Juan, Pcia. de San Juan |
| | Villegas 82' | | Verón 62' | Stadium: San Juan del Bicentenario |

| November 13, 2013 | Juventud Alianza | 0–0 (2–4 p) | Deportivo Guaymallén | Santa Lucía, Pcia. de San Juan |
| | | | | Stadium: Centenario |

| November 20, 2013 | Trinidad | 1–2 | Desamparados (SJ) | San Juan, Pcia. de San Juan |
| | González 2' | | Ceballos 15'; Sosa 25' | Stadium: San Juan del Bicentenario; Referee: Gabriel González |

| November 13, 2013 | Estudiantes (RC) | 1–1 (4–2 p) | Jorge Newbery (VM) | Río Cuarto, Pcia. de Córdoba |
| | Dopazo 76' | | Fioramonti 82' | Stadium: Ciudad de Río Cuarto; Referee: Daniel Gómez |

| November 13, 2013 | Talleres (P) | 1–0 | Altos Hornos Zapla | Perico, Pcia. de Jujuy |
| | Cardozo 33' | | | Stadium: Doctor Plinio Zabala; Referee: Víctor Ochoa |

| November 13, 2013 | Herminio Arrieta | 1–1 (3–2 p) | Monterrico San Vicente | Libertador San Martín, Pcia. de Jujuy |
| | Villa 43' | | Rodríguez 2' | Stadium: Monumental de Barrio Norte; Referee: Javier Bustelo |

| November 13, 2013 | Libertad (S) | 1–3 | Mitre (S) | Campo Santo, Pcia. de Salta |
| | Bonini 67' | | Navarro 48'; Parra 60'; Muro 90' | Stadium: Doctor Lucio Cornejo; Referee: Aldo Córdoba |

| November 13, 2013 | Atlético Policial (C) | 0–2 | Villa Cubas (C) | Catamarca, Pcia. de Catamarca |
| | | | Rizardo 72'; Sosa 90' | Stadium: Bicentenario; Referee: Claudio Orellana |

| November 13, 2013 | Concepción FC | 3–0 | Atlético Concepción | Concepción, Pcia. de Tucumán |
| | García 11' 23' 40' | | | Stadium: Stewart Shipton; Referee: Facundo Nanterne |

| November 13, 2013 | Deportivo Lastenia | 0–0 (4–5 p) | Deportivo Aguilares | Lastenia, Pcia. de Tucumán |
| | | | | Stadium: Lastenia; Referee: Diego Fernández |

| November 13, 2013 | Deportivo Tabacal | 3–0 | Progreso (RdlF) | Orán, Pcia. de Salta |
| | Fernández 2'; Elejalde 75'; Puntano 81' | | | Stadium: Dep. Tabacal; Referee: Enzo Rivas |

| November 13, 2013 | Unión Aconquija | 3–1 | Defensores de La Boca (LR) | Aconquija, Pcia. de Catamarca |
| | Ledesma 6' 72'; López 42' | | Mercado 51' | Stadium: Unión Aconquija; Referee: Juan Carlos Bazán |

| November 13, 2013 | Sportivo Fernández | 1–1 (5–6 p) | San Lorenzo (A) | Fernández, Pcia. de Stgo. del Estero |
| | Pavón 60' | | Carrizo 90' | Stadium: Sportivo Fernández; Referee: Ramón Romero |

| November 13, 2013 | Mitre (SdE) | 1–0 | Unión Santiago | Stgo. del Estero, Pcia. de Stgo. del Estero |
| | Sánchez 32' | | | Stadium: Doctores José y Antonio Castiglione; Referee: Rodrigo Rivero |

| November 13, 2013 | Sarmiento (Leones) | 4–0 | Sarmiento (SdE) | Leones, Pcia. de Córdoba |
| | Chiocarello 18'; Aldecoa 32'; Bersano 85' 87' | | | Stadium: La Calderita; Referee: Claudio Pavón |

| November 13, 2013 | Ben Hur | 3–1 | 9 de Julio (R) | Rafaela, Pcia. de Santa Fe |
| | Jaime 32'; Bertero 83' 90' | | Giaccone 79' | Stadium: Parque; Referee: Roberto Franco |

| November 20, 2013 | Las Palmas | 3–0 | Racing (C) | Córdoba, Pcia. de Córdoba |
| | Gotti 4'; Blanco 21'; Chiatti 45+1' | | | Stadium: Las Palmas; Referee: Julio Quinteros |

| November 13, 2013 | General Paz Juniors | 0–0 (5–6 p) | Alumni (VM) | Córdoba, Pcia. de Córdoba |
| | | | | Stadium: General Paz Juniors; Referee: Diego Andreucci |

| November 13, 2013 | 9 de Julio (M) | 3–0 | Tiro Federal (M) | Morteros, Pcia. de Córdoba |
| | Lezcano 5'; Figueroa 34'; Gaido 83' | | | Stadium: La Villa de Los Deportes; Referee: Maximiliano López |

| November 13, 2013 | Unión (S) | 4–1 | Argentino Quilmes (R) | Sunchales, Pcia. de Santa Fe |
| | Soldano 32'; Saucedo 51'; Molina 55'; Scott 75' | | Vitarelli Góngora 77' | Stadium: La Fortaleza del Bicho; Referee: Javier Simoncini |

| November 20, 2013 | Textil Mandiyú | 1–0 | Deportivo Curupay | Corrientes, Pcia. de Corrientes |
| | Santa Cruz 51' | | | Stadium: José Antonio Romero Feris; Referee: Sergio Pérez |

| November 13, 2013 | Huracán de Goya | 1–1 (4–2 p) | Ex Alumnos Escuela N°185 | Goya, Pcia. de Corrientes |
| | Dening 87' | | Dahmer 5' | Stadium: Ramón Oviedo; Referee: Milton Van Lierde |

| November 20, 2013 | San Martín (F) | 1–1 (2–4 p) | Sol de América (F) | Formosa, Pcia. de Formosa |
| | Giménez 87' | | Riquelme 90+4' | Stadium: Antonio Romero; Referee: Diego Fernández |

| November 13, 2013 | Sportivo Patria | 2–4 | Atlético Laguna Blanca | Formosa, Pcia. de Formosa |
| | Petry 30'; Troche 78' | | Espínola 10' 20' 75'; Lunghi 47' | Stadium: Antonio Romero; Referee: José Sandvay |

| November 13, 2013 | Viale FBC | 0–0 (4–2 p) | Colegiales (C) | Viale, Pcia. de Entre Ríos |
| | | | | Stadium: Leandro Cecotti; Referee: Gustavo Vilotta |

| November 13, 2013 | Sanjustino | 4–2 | San Jorge (SF) | San Justo, Pcia. de Santa Fe |
| | Ibáñez 18' 82'; Martín 45'; Bueno 69' | | Pignata 51'; Centurión 75' | Stadium: Sanjustino; Referee: Nahuel Viñas |

| November 13, 2013 | Sarmiento (R) | 3–0 | Resistencia Central | Resistencia, Pcia. de Chaco |
| | Costi 74'; Cáceres 87' 90+2' | | | Stadium: Centenario de Chaco; Referee: Fernando Brillada |

| November 13, 2013 | Atlético Adelante | 1–1 (4–2 p) | Aprendices Casildenses | Reconquista, Pcia. de Santa Fe |
| | Romero 90' | | Marisi 17' | Stadium: Atlético Adelante; Referee: Hugo Moreyra |

=== Regional Preliminary Round III ===
This round is contested by the winning 48 teams from the Regional Preliminary Round II. The round will be played on November 27 in a single match knock-out format. The 24 winning teams will advance to the Regional Initial Round.

| November 26, 2013 | Atlético Camioneros | 2–1 | Ferro Carril Sud | Jáuregui, Pcia. de Buenos Aires |
| | Nazar 65'; Lenciza 90+1' | | Janson 64' | Stadium: Carlos V Referee: Cristián Sgro |

| November 28, 2013 | Sportivo Rivadavia (VT) | 4–1 | Juventud (P) | Venado Tuerto, Pcia. de Santa Fe |
| | López 32' 80'; Lesman 49'; Berardi 83' | | Tissera 86' | Stadium: Coloso de Venado Tuerto; Referee: Jorge Potes |

| November 27, 2013 | Sarmiento (A) | 3–1 | Sports (S) | Ayacucho, Pcia. de Buenos Aires |
| | Baquero 6'; Salvagna 13' (o.g.); Sendra 86' | | Chávez 56' | Stadium: Municipal de Ayacucho; Referee: Darío Eberte |

| November 27, 2013 | Ferro Carril Oeste (GP) | 3–1 | FC Tres Algarrobos | General Pico, Pcia. de La Pampa |
| | Bidal 30' 33'; Vasilchik 90' | | Heiland 67' | Stadium: El Coloso de Barrio Talleres; Referee: Alejandro Juan |

| November 27, 2013 | Deportivo Roca | 1–1 (3–1 p) | Deportivo Madryn | General Roca, Pcia. de Río Negro |
| | Fernández 43' | | Bona 56' | Stadium: Luis Maiolino; Referee: Julián Garmendia |

| November 27, 2013 | Racing (T) | 1–2 | Boca Río Gallegos | Trelew, Pcia. de Chubut |
| | Hernández 64' | | Torres 12'; Paniagua 90+3' | Stadium: Cayetano Castro; Referee: Fabián Rodríguez |

| November 27, 2013 | Independiente (N) | 1–2 | Villa Congreso | Neuquén, Pcia. de Neuquén |
| | Sack 3' | | Cellerino 9'; Guiñazú 61' | Stadium: La Caldera; Referee: Norberto Britos |

| November 27, 2013 | Villa Mitre | 1–1 (5–3 p) | Liniers (BB) | Bahía Blanca, Pcia. de Buenos Aires |
| | Susvielles 51' | | Franco 77' | Stadium: El Fortín; Referee: Gabriel Spinella |

| November 28, 2013 | Sport Club Pacífico | 0–0 (4–3 p) | Gimnasia y Esgrima (Mza) | General Alvear, Pcia. de Mendoza |
| | | | | Stadium: El Coliseo; Referee: Luis Martínez |

| November 27, 2013 | Huracán (SR) | 3–1 | San Martín (M) | San Rafael, Pcia. de Mendoza |
| | Villalba 31'; Piergüidi 33' 52' | | Vargas 58' | Stadium: Pretel Hermanos; Referee: Juan Carlos Altamirano |

| November 27, 2013 | Unión (VK) | 1–0 | Deportivo Guaymallén | Villa Krause, Pcia. de San Juan |
| | Sánchez 12' | | | Stadium: 12 de Octubre; Referee: Jesús Castro |

| November 27, 2013 | Estudiantes (RC) | 3–0 | Desamparados (SJ) | Río Cuarto, Pcia. de Córdoba |
| | Flordelmundo 27' 63'; Garraza 37' | | | Stadium: Ciudad de Río Cuarto; Referee: Gustavo Aguinaga |

| November 27, 2013 | Talleres (P) | 2–0 | Herminio Arrieta | Perico, Pcia. de Jujuy |
| | Medina 3'; Juárez 90' | | | Stadium: Doctor Plinio Zabala; Referee: Enzo Ramírez |

| November 27, 2013 | Villa Cubas (C) | 1–0 | Mitre (S) | Catamarca, Pcia. de Catamarca |
| | Valatkevicnis 5' | | | Stadium: Bicentenario; Referee: Gerardo Romero |

| November 27, 2013 | Concepción FC | 1–1 (3–5 p) | Deportivo Aguilares | Concepción, Pcia. de Tucumán |
| | Tévez 56' | | Garrido 50' | Stadium: Stewart Shipton; Referee: Daniel Mansilla |

| November 27, 2013 | Deportivo Tabacal | 0–0 (2–4 p) | Unión Aconquija | Orán, Pcia. de Salta |
| | | | | Stadium: Deportivo Tabacal; Referee: Raúl Nolasco |

| November 27, 2013 | Mitre (SdE) | 0–0 (3–1 p) | San Lorenzo (A) | Santiago del Estero, Pcia. de Stgo. del Estero |
| | | | | Stadium: Docotores José y Antonio Castiglione; Referee: Luis Pesoa |

| November 27, 2013 | Sarmiento (L) | 2–0 | Ben Hur | Leones, Pcia. de Córdoba |
| | Chiocarello 45+2'; Zalazar 83' | | | Stadium: La Calderita; Referee: Julio Quinteros |

| November 27, 2013 | Las Palmas | 2–2 (2–4 p) | Alumni (VM) | Córdoba, Pcia. de Córdoba |
| | Gotti 90'; Romero 90+2' | | Monge 32' (o.g.); Aloi 38' | Stadium: Las Palmas; Referee: Maximiliano Magnani |

| November 27, 2013 | 9 de Julio (M) | 1–1 (6–7 p) | Unión (S) | Morteros, Pcia. de Córdoba |
| | González 56' | | Lucero 39' | Stadium: Villa de los Deportes; Referee: Oscar Palacios |

| November 27, 2013 | Huracán de Goya | 1–1 (2–4 p) | Textil Mandiyú | Goya, Pcia. de Corrientes |
| | Dening 57' | | Suárez 18' | Stadium: Ramón Oviedo; Referee: Alfredo Zalazar |

| November 27, 2013 | Sol de América (F) | 1–1 (3–5 p) | Atlético Laguna Blanca | Formosa, Pcia. de Formosa |
| | Sánchez 90+3' | | Lunghi 42' | Stadium: Antonio Romero; Referee: Fernando Brillada |

| November 28, 2013 | Sanjustino | 3–1 | Viale FBC | San Justo, Pcia. de Santa Fe |
| | Ibáñez 36' 90+3'; Marini 47' | | Simón 77' | Stadium: Sanjustino; Referee: Nahuel Viñas |

| November 27, 2013 | Sarmiento (R) | 1–0 | Atlético Adelante | Resistencia, Pcia. de Chaco |
| | Basso 59' | | | Stadium: Centenario; Referee: Walter Mercado |

== Regional Initial Round ==
This round is organized by the Consejo Federal.

=== Regional Initial Round I ===
This round is composed of two zones:

==== Torneo Argentino B Zone ====
In this zone, the 24 qualified teams from the Regional Preliminary Round III will take part. The matches will be played on December 10 in a single match knock-out format. The 12 winning teams will advance to the Regional Initial Round II.

| December 11, 2013 | Atlético Camioneros | 0–0 (2–1 p) | Sportivo Rivadavia (VT) | Jáuregui, Pcia. de Buenos Aires |
| | | | | Stadium: Carlos V Referee: Ricardo Romero |

| December 10, 2013 | Sarmiento (A) | 1–1 (2–3 p) | Ferro Carril Oeste (GP) | Ayacucho, Pcia. de Buenos Aires |
| | Roelofs 30' | | Ramos 21' | Stadium: Municipal de Ayacucho; Referee: Diego Tadiello |

| January 26, 2014 | Boca Río Gallegos | 2-1 | Deportivo Roca | Río Gallegos, Pcia. de Santa Cruz |
| | Ríos 25'; Ávila 70' | | Fernández 18' | Stadium: Defensores del Carmen; Referee: Raúl Brizuela |

| December 10, 2013 | Villa Mitre | 2–1 | Villa Congreso | Bahía Blanca, Pcia. de Buenos Aires |
| | Mugabure 35'; Carrillo 41' | | Santamarina 30' | Stadium: El Fortín; Referee: Marcelo Sanz |

| December 11, 2013 | Huracán (SR) | 0–0 (5–4 p) | Sport Club Pacífico | San Rafael, Pcia. de Mendoza |
| | | | | Stadium: Pretel Hermanos; Referee: Nelson Benites |

| December 11, 2013 | Unión (VK) | 0–0 (4–1 p) | Estudiantes (RC) | Villa Krause, Pcia. de San Juan |
| | | | | Stadium: 12 de Octubre; Referee: José Gutiérrez |

| December 11, 2013 | Talleres (P) | 0–0 (5–6 p) | Villa Cubas (C) | Perico, Pcia. de Jujuy |
| | | | | Stadium: Doctor Plinio Zabala; Referee: Diego Lambertín |

| December 10, 2013 | Unión Aconquija | 0–0 (4–2 p) | Deportivo Aguilares | Andalgalá, Pcia. de Catamarca |
| | | | | Stadium: Tiro Federal y Gimnasia de Andalgalá; Referee: Juan Rivero |

| December 11, 2013 | Mitre (SdE) | 1–1 (4–2 p) | Sarmiento (L) | Santiago del Estero, Pcia. de Stgo. del Estero |
| | Silveyra 54' | | Zalazar 49' | Stadium: Doctores José y Antonio Castiglione; Referee: Diego Rodríguez |

| January 26, 2014 | Unión (S) | 4-2 | Alumni (VM) | Sunchales, Pcia. de Santa Fe |
| | Suacedo 32'; Molina 48'; Rojo 84'; Escott 90+1' | | Bonaveris 62'; Stucky 86' (o.g.) | Stadium: La Fortaleza del Bicho; Referee: Maximiliano Moya |

| December 11, 2013 | Textil Mandiyú | 0–3 | Atlético Laguna Blanca | Corrientes, Pcia .de Corrientes |
| | | | Notario 42'; Burgos 56'; Fernández 74' | Stadium: José Antonio Romero Feris; Referee: Milton Van Lierde |

| January 28, 2014 | Sarmiento (R) | 1-2 | Sanjustino | Resistencia, Pcia. de Chaco |
| | Brizuela 23' | | Beltramos 43'; Olivera 45' | Stadium: Centenario; Referee: Walter Mercado |

==== Torneo Argentino A Zone ====
In this zone, all 24 teams from the Torneo Argentino A will participate. The matches will be played between November 5 and 20, in a single match knock-out format. The 12 winning teams will advance to the Regional Initial Round II.

| November 6, 2013 | Central Norte | 0–1 | Juventud Antoniana | Salta, Pcia. de Salta |
| | | | Aguirre 38' | Stadium: Padre Martearena; Referee: Gustavo Fabián |

| November 20, 2013 | Central Córdoba (SdE) | 1–0 | Gimnasia y Tiro | Stgo. del Estero, Pcia. de Stgo. del Estero |
| | Pato 52' | | | Stadium: Alfredo Terrera; Referee: Diego Gallo |

| November 5, 2013 | San Martín (T) | 2–3 | San Jorge (T) | San Miguel de Tucumán, Pcia. de Tucumán |
| | Silba 16'; Seri 45+2' | | Olmos 1'; Rodríguez 27'; Zambrano 80' | Stadium: La Ciudadela; Referee: Luis Lobo Medina |

| November 6, 2013 | Guaraní Antonio Franco | 1–1 (3–5 p) | Chaco For Ever | Posadas, Pcia. de Misiones |
| | Barinaga 18' | | Fragata 60' | Stadium: Clemente Fernández de Oliveira; Referee: Sebastián Mastrángelo |

| November 6, 2013 | Libertad (S) | 2–0 | Tiro Federal | Sunchales, Pcia. de Santa Fe |
| | Mendoza 34'; López 38' | | | Stadium: Doctor Plácido Tita; Referee: Ariel Montero |

| November 6, 2013 | Gimnasia y Esgrima (CdU) | 2–1 | Juventud Unida (G) | Concepción del Uruguay, Pcia. de Entre Ríos |
| | Castilla 11'; Umpiérrez 86' | | Vallejos 51' | Stadium: Manuel y Ramón Núñez; Referee: Carlos Boxler |

| November 20, 2013 | Unión (MdP) | 1–0 | Alvarado | Mar del Plata, Pcia. de Buenos Aires |
| | González 77' | | | Stadium: José María Minella; Referee: Sergio Testa |

| November 6, 2013 | Santamarina | 0–0 (3–2 p) | Racing (O) | Tandil, Pcia. de Buenos Aires |
| | | | | Stadium: Municipal General San Martín; Referee: Carlos Córdoba |

| November 6, 2013 | Guillermo Brown | 1–2 | CAI | Puerto Madryn, Pcia. de Chubut |
| | Rojas 4' | | Morales 33'; Vargas 90' | Stadium: Raúl Conti; Referee: Pascual Fernández |

| November 20, 2013 | Deportivo Maipú | 0–1 | Cipolletti | Maipú, Pcia. de Mendoza |
| | | | González 90+6' | Stadium: Omar Sperdutti; Referee: Leopoldo Gorosito |

| November 6, 2013 | Juventud Unida Univ. | 0–0 (5–4 p) | Estudiantes (SL) | La Punta, Pcia. de San Luis |
| | | | | Stadium: Estadio Provincial Juan Gilberto Funes; Referee: Francisco Acosta |

| November 6, 2013 | Def. de Belgrano (VR) | 0–0 (4–5 p) | Rivadavia (L) | Villa Ramallo, Pcia. de Buenos Aires |
| | | | | Stadium: Salomón Boeseldín |

=== Regional Initial Round II ===
This round is composed of two zones:

==== Torneo Argentino B Zone ====
In this zone, the 12 qualified teams from the first Regional Initial Round's Argentino B zone will take part. The matches are to be played between January 29 and February 5 in a single match knock-out format. The 6 winning teams will advance to the Regional Initial Round III.

| January 29, 2014 | Atlético Camioneros | 4-1 | Ferro Carril Oeste (GP) | Jáuregui, Pcia. de Buenos Aires |
| | Lenciza 41'; Fischer 56'; Allende 76'; Medina 90+1' | | Ragusa 20' | Stadium: Carlos V Referee: Lucas Gualdieri |

| February 5, 2014 | Villa Mitre | 0-1 | Boca Río Gallegos | Bahía Blanca, Pcia. de Buenos Aires |
| | | | Ríos 66' | Stadium: El Fortín; Referee: Facundo Elegart |

| February 5, 2014 | Huracán (SR) | 4-1 | Unión (VK) | San Rafael, Pcia. de Mendoza |
| | Piergüidi 36' 49'; Villalba 67'; Carrizo 90' | | Sacripanti 65' | Stadium: Pretel Hermanos; Referee: Héctor Sosa |

| January 30, 2014 | Villa Cubas (C) | 4-2 | Unión Aconquija | Catamarca, Pcia. de Catamarca |
| | Valatkevicnis 9'; Zelaya 21'; Sigampa 55'; Sosa 90+4' | | Ledesma 18' 25' | Stadium: Bicentenario; Referee: Ángel Argañaraz |

| February 5, 2014 | Mitre (SdE) | 2-5 | Unión (S) | Santiago del Estero, Pcia. de Stgo. del Estero |
| | Lazaro 23'; Sánchez 47' | | Molina 10' 22'; Saucedo 51' 85'; Soldano 70' | Stadium: Doctores José y Antonio Castiglione; Referee: Diego Fernández |

| February 5, 2014 | Sanjustino | 4-2 | Atlético Laguna Blanca | San Justo, Pcia. de Santa Fe |
| | Olivera 4'; Gómez Varas 14' 56'; Benítez 84' | | Villalba 79'; Ortellado 83' | Stadium: Sanjustino; Referee: Sergio Pérez |

==== Torneo Argentino A Zone ====
In this zone, the 12 qualified teams from the first Regional Initial Round's Argentino A zone will take part. The matches will be played between November 20 and December 4, in a single match knock-out format. The 6 winning teams will advance to the Regional Initial Round III.

| December 4, 2013 | Juventud Antoniana | 1–2 | Central Córdoba (SdE) | Salta, Pcia. de Salta |
| | Badaracco 44' | | Suárez 49'; Salvatierra 87' | Stadium: Padre Martearena; Referee: Luis Lobo Medina |

| November 27, 2013 | Chaco For Ever | 1–0 | San Jorge (T) | Resistencia, Pcia. de Chaco |
| | Silva 21' | | | Stadium: Juan Alberto García; Referee: Sebastián Mastrángelo |

| November 27, 2013 | Gimnasia y Esgrima (CdU) | 2–1 | Libertad (S) | Concepción del Uruguay, Pcia. de Entre Ríos |
| | Umpiérrez 8' 44' | | Arach 65' | Stadium: Manuel y Ramón Núñez; Referee: Fernando Marconi |

| December 4, 2013 | Unión (MdP) | 0–1 | Santamarina | Mar del Plata, Pcia. de Buenos Aires |
| | | | Azcarate 45+2' | Stadium: José María Minella; Referee: Sebastián Mastrángelo |

| February 2, 2014 | Cipolletti | 3-0 | CAI | Cipolletti, Pcia. de Río Negro |
| | Lamolla 28'; Negri 42'; San Martín 58' (o.g.) | | | Stadium: La Visera de Cemento; Referee: Sergio Testa |

| November 27, 2013 | Juventud Unida Univ. | 1–0 | Rivadavia (L) | San Luis, Pcia. de San Luis |
| | Bergese 65' | | | Stadium: Mario Sebastián Diez; Referee: Pascual Fernández |

=== Regional Initial Round III ===
All 12 teams qualified from the Regional Initial Round II (6 from each zone) will participate in this round. The matches will be played on February 12. Every match will have an Argentino A team facing an Argentino B team. The winners will advance to the Final Round.

| February 12, 2014 | Santamarina | 1-1 (5-4 p) | Atlético Camioneros | Tandil, Pcia. de Buenos Aires |
| | Timpanaro 18' | | Fischer 63' | Stadium: Municipal General San Martín; Referee: Oscar Marconi |

| February 19, 2014 | Cipolletti | 1-1 (5-4 p) | Boca Río Gallegos | Cipolletti, Pcia. de Río Negro |
| | Lamolla 50' | | Guzmán 13' | Stadium: La Visera de Cemento; Referee: Federico Presa |

| February 13, 2014 | Juventud Unida Univ. | 4-1 | Huracán (SR) | San Luis, Pcia. de San Luis |
| | Garrido 12' 49'; Castellano 37'; Aguirre 72' | | Rebeco 23' | Stadium: Mario Sebastián Diez; Referee: Diego Gallo |

| February 12, 2014 | Central Córdoba (SdE) | 1-1 (2-4 p) | Villa Cubas (C) | Stgo. del Estero, Pcia. de Stgo. del Estero |
| | Moreno 15' | | Valatkevicnis 11' | Stadium: Alfredo Terrera; Referee: Miguel Mazón |

| February 12, 2014 | Chaco For Ever | 7-4 | Sanjustino | Resistencia, Pcia. de Chaco |
| | Visconti 6' 54' 59'; Brítez 15' 87'; Silva 48'; Barreña 50' | | Ibáñez 26'; Olivera 39' 47'; Fernández 45+2' | Stadium: Juan Alberto García; Referee: Gustavo Fabián |

| February 13, 2014 | Gimnasia y Esgrima (CdU) | 0-0 (4-2 p) | Unión (S) | Concepción del Uruguay, Pcia. de Entre Ríos |
| | | | | Stadium: Manuel y Ramón Núñez; Referee: Gerardo Cedro Méndez |

== Metropolitan Initial Round ==
This round is organized directly by the Asociación del Fútbol Argentino

=== Metropolitan Initial Round I ===
In this round, all Primera D teams will participate as well as 10 teams from Primera C (the two teams promoted from Primera D for the 2013/14 season, and the 8 teams with the worst points per match average that weren't relegated at the end of the 2012/13 season). The matches will be played between November 6 and 14, in a single match knock-out format. The 14 winning teams will advance to the Metropolitan Initial Round II.

| November 7, 2013 | General Lamadrid | 2–2 (4–5 p) | Dock Sud | Villa Devoto, Cdad. de Buenos Aires |
| | Ortíz López 58' 60' | | Fleitas 4'; Tapia 28' | Stadium: Enrique Sexto; Referee: Cristian Suárez |

| November 6, 2013 | Luján | 2–2 (3–2 p) | Liniers | Luján, Pcia. de Buenos Aires |
| | Gorosito 32' 54' | | Palmerola 16'; Coassini 69' | Stadium: Municipal de Luján; Referee: Cristian Benítez |

| November 12, 2013 | San Miguel | 1–1 (4–2 p) | San Martín (B) | Muñíz, Pcia. de Buenos Aires |
| | Fonseca 26' | | Sosa 50' | Stadium: Néstor Bedgni; Referee: Rodrigo Sabini |

| November 7, 2013 | El Porvenir | 2–1 | Juventud Unida | Gerli, Pcia. de Buenos Aires |
| | De Seta 40'; Palma Pérez 90+2' | | Fonzalida 50' | Stadium: Gildo Francisco Ghersinich; Referee: Ariel Roldán |

| November 12, 2013 | Leandro N. Alem | 1–2 | Deportivo Riestra | Gral. Rodríguez, Pcia. de Buenos Aires |
| | Davio 65' | | Gauna 10'; Sosa 15' | Stadium: Leandro N. Alem; Referee: Edgardo Kopanchuk |

| November 14, 2013 | Cambaceres | 1–0 | Centro Español | Ensenada, Pcia. de Buenos Aires |
| | Vinaccia 60' | | | Stadium: 12 de Octubre; Referee: Gastón Iglesias |

| November 6, 2013 | Lugano | 0–1 | Excursionistas | Tapiales, Pcia. de Buenos Aires |
| | | | Yanzi 71' | Stadium: José Moraños; Referee: Antonio Amato |

| November 6, 2013 | Atlas | 0–0 (7–6 p) | Ituzaingó | Gral. Rodríguez, Pcia. de Buenos Aires |
| | | | | Stadium: Ricardo Puga; Referee: Lucas Comesaña |

| November 12, 2013 | Argentino (Q) | 1–1 (3–2 p) | Claypole | Quilmes, Pcia. de Buenos Aires |
| | Alonso 35' | | Aranda 5' | Stadium: Argentino de Quilmes; Referee: Juan Pafundi |

| November 6, 2013 | Cañuelas | 0–2 | Talleres (RE) | Cañuelas, Pcia. de Buenos Aires |
| | | | Scornaienchi 8'; Britos 83' | Stadium: Jorge Alfredo Arín; Referee: Mariano Negrete |

| November 6, 2013 | J. J. de Urquiza | 0–1 | Central Ballester | Loma Hermosa, Pcia. de Buenos Aires |
| | | | Maciel 83' | Stadium: Ramón Roque Martín; Referee: Fernando Velarde |

| November 7, 2013 | Victoriano Arenas | 0–1 | Deportivo Paraguayo | Valentín Alsina, Pcia. de Buenos Aires |
| | Anriquez 58' | | Ayala 68' | Stadium: Saturnino Moure; Referee: Juan Pastor [penaltyscore= 7–8 |

| November 13, 2013 | Argentino (R) | 4–2 | Yupanqui | Rosario, Pcia. de Santa Fe |
| | Pons 58' 66'; Cabral 52'; Schiavo 90' | | Fuentes 78' 87' | Stadium: José Martín Olaeta; Referee: Sebastián Zunino |

| November 12, 2013 | Sportivo Barracas | 0–0 (3–4 p) | Muñiz | Ciudad Evita, Pcia. de Buenos Aires |
| | | | | Stadium: República de Italia; Referee: Mariano Seco |

=== Metropolitan Initial Round II ===
This round will be composed of two zones:

==== Primera C/D Zone ====
This zone will have the 14 teams qualified from the previous round, as well as the 10 remaining Primera C teams. The matches will be played in a single match knock-out format. The winners will advance to the Metropolitan Initial Round III.

| December 4, 2013 | San Miguel | 1–0 | Ferrocarril Midland | Muñíz, Pcia. de Buenos Aires |
| | Lloret 15' | | | Stadium: Franco Muggeri; Referee: Hernán Mastrángelo |

| November 26, 2013 | Deportivo Español | 2–0 | Berazategui | Parque Avellaneda, Buenos Aires |
| | Sosa 15'; Carrizo 90' | | | Stadium: Nueva España; Referee: Antonio Amato |

| November 27, 2013 | San Telmo | 5–0 | Deportivo Paraguayo | Isla Maciel, Pcia. de Buenos Aires |
| | Bonnassies 30'; Ávalos 70' 88'; Lezcano 85'; Peña 90' | | | Stadium: Doctor Osvaldo Baletto; Referee: Rodrigo Sabini |

| November 27, 2013 | Central Ballester | 1–1 (5–3 p) | Muñiz | Muñíz, Pcia. de Buenos Aires |
| | Ponce 2' | | Maldonado 82' | Stadium: Nestor Bedgni; Referee: Lucas Comesaña |

| November 26, 2013 | Sportivo Italiano | 2–0 | El Porvenir | Ciudad Evita, Pcia. de Buenos Aires |
| | Rojano 15'; Martínez 46' | | | Stadium: República de Italia; Referee: Diego Colombo |

| November 27, 2013 | Sacachispas | 5–2 | Argentino (R) | Villa Soldati, Buenos Aires |
| | Arrieta 27'; Estévez 38'; Trecco 45'; Rodríguez 82'; Soto 88' | | Re 80'; Cabral 90+2' | Stadium: Roberto Larrosa; Referee: Fernando Velarde |

| November 27, 2013 | Luján | 2–0 | Central Córdoba (R) | Luján, Pcia. de Buenos Aires |
| | Paccor 71'; Gorosito 90+3' | | | Stadium: Municipal de Luján; Referee: Cristian Cernadas |

| December 4, 2013 | Deportivo Riestra | 1–1 (2–4 p) | Argentino (Q) | Villa Soldati, Buenos Aires |
| | Flores 36' | | Leguiza 87' | Stadium: Guillermo Laza; Referee: Cristián Suárez |

| December 4, 2013 | Cambaceres | 0–0 (5–4 p) | Argentino (M) | Ensenada, Pcia. de Buenos Aires |
| | | | | Stadium: 12 de Octubre; Referee: Gastón Iglesias |

| December 4, 2013 | Atlas | 0–2 | Defensores Unidos | Gral. Rodríguez, Pcia. de Buenos Aires |
| | | | Italiani 15'; Pastor 24' | Stadium: Ricardo Puga; Referee: Damián Rubino |

| December 4, 2013 | Excursionistas | 2–3 | Talleres (RE) | Belgrano, Buenos Aires |
| | Ledesma 1'; Villanueva 34' | | Gentinetta 11' 79'; Campodónico 73' | Stadium: Excursionistas; Referee: Leandro Rey Hilfer |

| November 27, 2013 | Laferrere | 1–0 | Dock Sud | Gregorio de Laferrère, Pcia. de Buenos Aires |
| | Nieva 34' | | | Stadium: José Luis Sánchez; Referee: Gastón Iglesias |

==== Primera B Metropolitana Zone ====
This zone will have 18 teams from the Primera B Metropolitana (the two teams just promoted from the Primera C and the 14 teams with the worst points per game average that weren't relegated by the end of the 2012/13 season). The matches will be played on November 20 in a single match knock-out format. The winners will advance to the Metropolitan Initial Round III.

| November 20, 2013 | Defensores de Belgrano | 2–1 | Flandria | Núñez, Buenos Aires |
| | González 13' (pen.); Bueno 45+1' | | Bielkiewicz 90+3' | Stadium: Estadio Juan Pasquale; Referee: Germán Bermúdez |

| November 20, 2013 | Chacarita Juniors | 1–0 | Nueva Chicago | Villa Maipú, Pcia. de Buenos Aires |
| | Lentini 47' | | | Stadium: Estadio Chacarita Juniors; Referee: Pablo Dóvalo |

| November 20, 2013 | Deportivo Merlo | 0–3 | Los Andes | Merlo, Pcia. de Buenos Aires |
| | | | Soriano 17'; Blanco 37'; Noriega 90' | Stadium: Estadio José Manuel Moreno; Referee: Eduardo Gutiérrez |

| November 27, 2013 | Deportivo Morón | 0–0 (5–4 p) | Comunicaciones | Morón, Pcia. de Buenos Aires |
| | | | | Stadium: Nuevo Francisco Urbano; Referee: José Carreras |

| November 20, 2013 | Deportivo Armenio | 1–1 (4–3 p) | Almagro | Ing. Maschwitz, Pcia. de Buenos Aires |
| | Molina 8' (pen.) | | Arce 43' | Stadium: Estadio Armenia; Referee: Julio César Barraza |

| November 20, 2013 | Acassuso | 3–0 | Tristán Suárez | Vicente López, Pcia. de Buenos Aires |
| | Minici 8'; Ábalos 23' (pen.); Salomone 58' | | | Stadium: Estadio Ciudad de Vicente López; Referee: Yamil Possi |

| November 20, 2013 | Temperley | 1–0 | Villa Dálmine | Temperley, Pcia. de Buenos Aires |
| | López 88' | | | Stadium: Alfredo Beranger; Referee: Lucas Di Bastiano |

| November 20, 2013 | Fénix | 1–1 (4–2 p) | Colegiales | Pilar, Pcia. de Buenos Aires |
| | Ledesma 61' | | Sosa 88' | Stadium: Carlos Barraza; Referee: Martín Gonaldi |

| November 27, 2013 | Barracas Central | 0–0 (1–4 p) | UAI Urquiza | Barracas, Buenos Aires |
| | | | | Stadium: Claudio "Chiqui" Tapia; Referee: Gastón Meineri |

=== Metropolitan Initial Round III ===
Like the previous round, there will be two zones:

==== Primera C/D Zone ====
The qualified 12 Primera C/D Zone teams from the previous round will participate. The matches will be played in a single match knock-out format. The winners will advance to the Metropolitan Initial Round IV.

| February 3, 2014 | San Miguel | 1-1 (4-5 p) | Sportivo Italiano | Muñíz, Pcia. de Buenos Aires |
| | Fiscella 42' | | Rojano 86' | Stadium: Franco Muggeri; Referee: Damián Rubino |

| December 11, 2013 | Cambaceres | 3–0 | Central Ballester | Ensenada, Pcia. de Buenos Aires |
| | Castro 23' 51'; Vinaccia 87' | | | Stadium: 12 de Octubre; Referee: Cristián Benítez |

| February 3, 2014 | Defensores Unidos | 1-1 (3-4 p) | Deportivo Español | Zárate, Pcia. de Buenos Aires |
| | Amado 50' | | Romero 33' | Stadium: Gigante de Villa Fox; Referee: Sebastián Bresba |

| February 4, 2014 | Talleres (RE) | 1-0 | San Telmo | Remedios de Escalada, Pcia. de Buenos Aires |
| | Campodónico 90+1' | | | Stadium: Talleres (RE); Referee: Juan Ledo |

| February 3, 2014 | Luján | 2-1 | Laferrere | Luján, Pcia. de Buenos Aires |
| | Gorosito 30' 52' | | Coassini 48' | Stadium: Municipal de Luján; Referee: Hernán Mastrángelo |

| February 3, 2014 | Sacachispas | 2-0 | Argentino (Q) | Villa Soldati, Buenos Aires |
| | Miranda Moreira 39'; Cuevas 77' | | | Stadium: Roberto Larrosa; Referee: Mauro Biasutto |

==== Primera B Metropolitana Zone ====
The qualified 9 B Metropolitana Zone teams from the previous round will participate along with the 3 remaining teams (Estudiantes (BA), Atlanta, Platense). The matches will be played in a single match knock-out format. The winners will advance to the Metropolitan Initial Round IV.

| December 4, 2013 | Estudiantes (BA) | 6–1 | Platense | Caseros, Pcia. de Buenos Aires |
| | Britos 3'; Serrano 11'; Soria 39'; Yassogna 46'; Figueroa 69'; Gaona 78' | | Vega 48' | Stadium: Ciudad de Caseros; Referee: Ariel Penel |

| December 4, 2013 | Deportivo Armenio | 3–1 | Deportivo Morón | Ing. Maschwitz, Pcia. de Buenos Aires |
| | Molina 18' 32'; Ramos 87' | | Cabrera 90' | Stadium: Estadio Armenia; Referee: Gonzalo López Aldazábal |

| February 3, 2014 | Temperley | 2-3 | Chacarita Juniors | Temperley, Pcia. de Buenos Aires |
| | López 65' 81' | | Lentini 12'; Rosso 45+2' 58' | Stadium: Alfredo Beranger; Referee: Héctor Paletta |

| February 19, 2014 | Los Andes | 2-1 | Atlanta | Morón, Pcia. de Buenos Aires |
| | Noriega 64'; Vera 90' | | Castro 7' | Stadium: Nuevo Francisco Urbano; Referee: Yamil Possi |

| December 4, 2013 | UAI Urquiza | 1–1 (4–3 p) | Defensores de Belgrano | Villa Lynch, Pcia. de Buenos Aires |
| | Villán 44' | | Aguirre 90+2' | Stadium: Monumental de Villa Lynch; Referee: Pablo Giménez |

| February 3, 2014 | Fénix | 1-3 | Acassuso | Pilar, Pcia. de Buenos Aires |
| | Ruiz 42' | | Friedrich 48'; Minici 56'; Pumpido 89' | Stadium: Carlos Barraza; Referee: Ignacio Lupani |

=== Metropolitan Initial Round IV ===
All 12 qualified teams from the previous will participate. The matches will be played in a single match knock-out format. The winners will advance to the Final Round.

| February 25, 2014 | Estudiantes (BA) | 1-0 | UAI Urquiza | Caseros, Pcia. de Buenos Aires |
| | Gómez 5' | | | Stadium: Ciudad de Caseros; Referee: Pablo Dovalo |

| March 7, 2014 | Sacachispas | 3-0 | Luján | Villa Soldati, Buenos Aires |
| | Ledesma 36' 60'; Miranda Moreira 82' | | | Stadium: Roberto Larrosa; Referee: Rodrigo Pafundi |

| February 27, 2014 | Chacarita Juniors | 2-1 | Deportivo Armenio | Villa Maipú, Pcia. de Buenos Aires |
| | Piris 58'; Lentini 89' | | Molina 54' | Stadium: Chacarita Juniors; Referee: Rodrigo Gonaldi |

| March 4, 2014 | Los Andes | 1-1 (2–4 p) | Sportivo Italiano | Lomas de Zamora, Pcia. de Buenos Aires |
| | Blanco 47' | | Di Biasi 32' | Stadium: Eduardo Gallardón; Referee: Paulo Vigliano |

| March 5, 2014 | Acassuso | 2-0 | Deportivo Español | Vicente López, Pcia. de Buenos Aires |
| | Minici 22'; Ceballos 72' | | | Stadium: Estadio Ciudad de Vicente López; Referee: Julio Barraza |

| March 6, 2014 | Cambaceres | 0-0 (4–1 p) | Talleres (RE) | Ensenada, Pcia. de Buenos Aires |
| | | | | Stadium: 12 de Octubre; Referee: Americo Monsalvo |

== Final round ==
=== Final Round I ===
This round involves the 6 teams qualified from the Regional Initial Round, 6 teams qualified from the Metropolitan Initial Round and 8 clubs from the Primera B Nacional: the four newly promoted to the division (Brown de Adrogué, Sportivo Belgrano, Talleres (C) and Villa San Carlos) and the four teams with the worst point average that weren't relegated at the end of the 2012/13 season (Aldosivi, Crucero del Norte, Ferro Carril Oeste and Instituto). The round was contested between March 12 and April 2, in a single knock-out match format. The 10 winning teams advanced to the next round.

| March 12, 2014 | Talleres (C) | 2–1 | Chaco For Ever | Córdoba, Pcia. de Córdoba |
| | Friedrich 73'; Tévez 90+5' | | Matto 64' | Stadium: Mario Alberto Kempes; Referee: Damian Espinoza |

| March 20, 2014 | Santamarina | 1-1 (3–1 p) | Sacachispas | Tandil, Pcia. de Buenos Aires |
| | Strada 85' | | Miranda Moreira 85' | Stadium: Estadio Municipal Gral. San Martín; Referee: Ariel Penel |

| March 20, 2014 | Juventud Unida Univ. | 0-0 (4–2 p) | Cambaceres | La Punta, Pcia. de San Luis |
| | | | | Stadium: Estadio Provincial Juan Gilberto Funes; Referee: Carlos Cordoba |

| March 26, 2014 | Aldosivi | 2-1 | Acassuso | Tristán Suárez, Pcia. de Buenos Aires |
| | Fredes 44'; De Hoyos 56' | | Planté 77' | Stadium: 20 de Octubre; Referee: Héctor Paletta |

| March 27, 2014 | Ferro Carril Oeste | 3-0 | Sportivo Italiano | Tristán Suárez, Pcia. de Buenos Aires |
| | Carranza 4'; Caballero 78' 86' | | | Stadium: 20 de Octubre; Referee: Nicolás Lamolina |

| March 27, 2014 | Sportivo Belgrano | 0-1 | Estudiantes (BA) | Córdoba, Pcia. de Córdoba |
| | | | Yassogna 36' | Stadium: Estadio Presidente Perón |

| April 2, 2014 | Villa Cubas (C) | 2-3 | Brown | Catamarca, Pcia. de Catamarca |
| | Barrionuevo 37'; Valatkevicnis 72' | | García 11' 52'; Miranda 12' | Stadium: Estadio Bicentenario Ciudad de Catamarca; Referee: Federico Guaymas |

| April 2, 2014 | Instituto | 3-1 | Chacarita Juniors | Córdoba, Pcia. de Córdoba |
| | Bernardi 30'; Masuero 35'; Godoy 58' | | Rosso 88' | Stadium: Mario Alberto Kempes; Referee: Mariano Gonzalez |

| April 2, 2014 | Villa San Carlos | 1-1 (2–4 p) | Cipolletti | Tristán Suárez, Pcia. de Buenos Aires |
| | Mendoza 85' | | Vergara 82' | Stadium: 20 de Octubre; Referee: Gaston Suarez |

| April 2, 2014 | Crucero del Norte | 2-0 | Gimnasia y Esgrima (CdU) | Sarandí, Pcia. de Buenos Aires |
| | Aquino 45+1' 58' | | | Stadium: Estadio Julio Humberto Grondona; Referee: Jorge Baliño |

=== Final Round II ===
This round will have the 10 qualified teams from the Final Round I and the rest of the Nacional B teams, The round was contested between April 9 and May 7, in a single knock-out match format. The 12 winning teams will advance to the Round of 32.

| April 9, 2014 | Independiente | 4-2 | Santamarina | La Punta, Pcia. de San Luis |
| | Insúa 26' 62'; Monserrat 35'; Menéndez 65' | | Celaya 41'; Timpanaro 71' | Stadium: Estadio Provincial Juan Gilberto Funes; Referee: Carlos Maglio |

| April 9, 2014 | Atlético Tucumán | 0-1 | Ferro Carril Oeste | Salta, Pcia. de Salta |
| | | | Coll 19' | Stadium: Estadio Padre Ernesto Martearena; Referee: Gaston Suarez |

| April 16, 2014 | Talleres (C) | 3-0 | Sarmiento (J) | Córdoba, Pcia. de Córdoba |
| | Carabajal 51'; Tévez 71'; Álvarez 88' | | | Stadium: Mario Alberto Kempes; Referee: Nicolas Lamolina |

| April 16, 2014 | Defensa y Justicia | 1-1 (4–1 p) | Brown | Morón, Pcia. de Buenos Aires |
| | Bustamante 38' | | Lemmo 51' | Stadium: Nuevo Francisco Urbano; Referee: Federico Beligoy |

| April 23, 2014 | Gimnasia y Esgrima (J) | 0-0 (2-4 p) | Estudiantes (BA) | Salta, Pcia. de Salta |
| | | | | Stadium: Estadio Padre Ernesto Martearena; Referee: Héctor Paletta |

| April 23, 2014 | Independiente Riv. | 1-2 | Almirante Brown | San Juan, Pcia. de San Juan |
| | Cardozo 3' | | Silva 23' (o.g.); Pereyra 74' | Stadium: Estadio del Bicentenario; Referee: Pedro Argañaraz |

| April 30, 2014 | Instituto | 2-2 (5-4 p) | Patronato | Córdoba, Pcia. de Córdoba |
| | Acosta 26'; Minetti 61' | | Velazquez 33'; Bernardi 69' | Stadium: Mario Alberto Kempes; Referee: German Bermudez |

| April 30, 2014 | Juventud Unida Univ. | 0-0 (4-1 p) | Unión | La Punta, Pcia. de San Luis |
| | | | | Stadium: Estadio Provincial Juan Gilberto Funes; Referee: Jose Carreras |

| April 30, 2014 | San Martín (SJ) | 2-1 | Cipolletti | San Juan, Pcia. de San Juan |
| | Caprari 54'; Salas 89' | | Chironi 37' | Stadium: Estadio del Bicentenario; Referee: Fernando Espinoza |

| May 7, 2014 | Aldosivi | 0-3 | Banfield | La Punta, Pcia. de San Luis |
| | | | Molina 12' 67'; Chetti 63' | Stadium: Estadio Provincial Juan Gilberto Funes; Referee: Fernando Echenique |

| May 7, 2014 | Huracán | 2-2 (5-4 p) | Crucero del Norte | Sarandí, Pcia. de Buenos Aires |
| | Caruso 4' 87' | | Torres 24'; Fileppi 62' | Stadium: Estadio Julio Humberto Grondona; Referee: Andres Merlos |

| May 7, 2014 | Boca Unidos | 1-1 (0-3 p) | Douglas Haig | Ciudad Evita, Pcia. de Buenos Aires |
| | Perea 69' | | Cuevas 43' | Stadium: República de Italia; Referee: Julio Barraza |

=== Upper bracket ===
Round of 32
River Plate | 0 (6)
Ferro Carril Oeste | 0 (5)
Lanús | 0
Colón | 1
Rosario Central | 3
Juventud Unida Univ. | 1
Tigre | 0 (5)
All Boys | 0 (4)
Racing | 1
San Martín (SJ) | 0
Gimnasia y Esgrima (LP) | 0 (2)
Argentinos Juniors | 0 (4)
Vélez Sársfield | 0
Estudiantes (BA) | 2
Arsenal | 1
Instituto | 3

Round of 16
River Plate | 0 (4)
Colón | 0 (2)
Rosario Central | 1
Tigre | 0
Racing | 0
Argentinos Juniors | 1
Estudiantes (BA) | 1
Instituto | 0

Quarterfinals
River Plate | 0 (4)
Rosario Central | 0 (5)
Argentinos Juniors | 1 (5)
Estudiantes (BA) | 1 (4)

Semifinals
Rosario Central | 5
Argentinos Juniors | 0

=== Lower bracket ===
Round of 32
San Lorenzo | 2
Almirante Brown | 0
Godoy Cruz | 3 (2)
Defensa y Justicia | 3 (4)
Newell's Old Boys | 1
Talleres (C) | 3
Olimpo | 0 (2)
Atlético de Rafaela | 0 (4)
Estudiantes (LP) | 3
Douglas Haig | 1
Belgrano | 0
Independiente | 2
Boca Juniors | 0
Huracán | 2
Quilmes | 0
Banfield | 4

Round of 16
San Lorenzo | 1
Defensa y Justicia | 2
Talleres (C) | 1
Atlético de Rafaela | 2
Estudiantes (LP) | 2
Independiente | 0
Huracán | 2 (3)
Banfield | 2 (2)

Quarterfinals
Defensa y Justicia | 0
Atlético de Rafaela | 1
Estudiantes (LP) | 1 (2)
Huracán | 1 (3)

Semifinals
Atlético de Rafaela | 0
Huracán | 2

=== Round of 32 ===
This round had the 12 qualified teams from the Final Round II and the twenty (20) teams of Primera División, The round was contested between July 17 and August 12, in a single knock-out match format. The 16 winning teams advanced to the Round of 16.

| July 27, 2014 | River Plate | 0–0 (6–5 p) | Ferro Carril Oeste | Salta, Pcia. de Salta |
| 21:30 | | Report | | Stadium: Estadio Padre Ernesto Martearena; Referee: Federico Beligoy |
| | Penalties |
| | Vangioni (penalty scored); Lanzini (penalty missed); Mora (penalty scored); Ponzio (penalty missed); Pisculichi (penalty scored); Rojas (penalty scored); Funes Mori (penalty scored); Maidana (penalty scored) | | (penalty missed) Tuzzio; (penalty scored) Bazán; (penalty missed) Caballero; (penalty scored) Frontini; (penalty scored) Klusener; (penalty scored) Zaninovic; (penalty scored) Mancinelli; (penalty missed) Alderete |

| July 27, 2014 | Lanús | 0–1 | Colón | Sarandí, Pcia. de Buenos Aires |
| 16:15 | | Report | Callejo 70' | Stadium: Estadio Julio Humberto Grondona; Referee: Juan Pablo Pompei |

| July 26, 2014 | Rosario Central | 3–1 | Juventud Unida Univ. | Córdoba, Pcia. de Córdoba |
| 17:15 | Niell 25'; Aguirre 46'; Abreu 55' | Report | Reynoso 50' | Stadium: Estadio Juan Domingo Perón; Referee: Ariel Penel |

| July 28, 2014 | Tigre | 0–0 (5–4 p) | All Boys | Parque Patricios, Buenos Aires |
| 15:00 | | Report | | Stadium: Estadio Tomás Adolfo Ducó; Referee: Mauro Vigliano |
| | Penalties |
| | Peñalba (penalty missed); Canuto (penalty missed); Wilchez (penalty scored); Arzura (penalty missed); Garate (penalty scored); Rusculleda (penalty scored); Rincón (penalty scored); Cáceres (penalty scored) | | (penalty missed) Battión; (penalty missed) Pellegrino; (penalty scored) Paz; (penalty scored) J. Fernández; (penalty missed) Velázquez; (penalty scored) Morales; (penalty scored) di Plácido; (penalty missed) L. Fernández |

| July 27, 2014 | Racing | 1–0 | San Martín (SJ) | La Punta, Pcia. de San Luis |
| 18:30 | Acuña 50' | Report | | Stadium: Estadio Provincial Juan Gilberto Funes; Referee: Saúl Laverni |

| July 25, 2014 | Gimnasia y Esgrima (LP) | 0–0 (2–4 p) | Argentinos Juniors | Lanús, Pcia. de Buenos Aires |
| 18:10 | | Report | | Stadium: Estadio Ciudad de Lanús; Referee: Carlos Maglio |
| | Penalties |
| | A. Fernández (penalty scored); Vegetti (penalty missed); Licht (penalty scored); I. Fernández (penalty missed) | | (penalty scored) Álvarez; (penalty scored) Torrén; (penalty scored) Ledesma; (penalty scored) Iñíguez |

| July 24, 2014 | Vélez Sársfield | 0–2 | Estudiantes (BA) | Lanús, Pcia. de Buenos Aires |
| 19:15 | | Report | Serrano 44'; Cardozo 82' (o.g.) | Stadium: Estadio Ciudad de Lanús; Referee: Mariano González |

| July 23, 2014 | Arsenal | 1–3 | Instituto | La Punta, Pcia. de San Luis |
| 18:30 | Cuesta 16' | Report | Marcone 28' (o.g.); Bernardi 49'; Burzio 77' | Stadium: Estadio Provincial Juan Gilberto Funes; Referee: Fernando Echenique |

| July 17, 2014 | San Lorenzo | 2–0 | Almirante Brown | La Punta, Pcia. de San Luis |
| 19:30 | Catalán 35'; Cauteruccio 63' | Report | | Stadium: Estadio Provincial Juan Gilberto Funes; Referee: Andrés Merlos |
| | Penalties |
| | Moiraghi (penalty scored); Gaona Lugo (penalty missed); Musto (penalty scored); Gil (penalty missed) |

| July 23, 2014 | Godoy Cruz | 3–3 (2–4 p) | Defensa y Justicia | San Juan, Pcia. de San Juan |
| 21:30 | Castillón 74' 87'; Fernández 76' | Report | Rius 23'; Fernández 35'; Rodríguez 55' | Stadium: Estadio del Bicentenario; Referee: Alejandro Castro |
| | Penalties |
| | Cabrera (penalty missed); Fernández (penalty scored); Ceballos (penalty scored); Castillón (penalty missed) | | (penalty scored) Fernández; (penalty scored) Camacho; (penalty scored) Tejera; (penalty scored) González |

| July 25, 2014 | Newell's Old Boys | 1–3 | Talleres (C) | Rafaela, Pcia. de Santa Fe |
| 21:15 | Tonso 11' | Report | Mozzo 17'; Chaves 49' 65' | Stadium: Estadio Nuevo Monumental; Referee: Jorge Baliño |

| July 22, 2014 | Olimpo | 0–0 (2–4 p) | Atlético de Rafaela | Junín, Pcia. de Buenos Aires |
| 15:00 | | Report | | Stadium: Estadio Eva Perón; Referee: Pablo Díaz |
| | Penalties |
| | Moiraghi (penalty scored); Gaona Lugo (penalty missed); Musto (penalty scored); Gil (penalty missed) | | (penalty missed) Eluchans; (penalty scored) Albertengo; (penalty scored) Jominy; (penalty scored) Rodríguez Rojas; (penalty scored) Vittor |

| July 19, 2014 | Estudiantes (LP) | 3–1 | Douglas Haig | Banfield, Pcia. de Buenos Aires |
| 16:30 | Carrillo 12'; Martínez 59'; Correa 68' | Report | Gioda 27' | Stadium: Estadio Florencio Sola; Referee: Luis Alvarez |

| July 28, 2014 | Belgrano | 0–2 | Independiente | Banfield, Pcia. de Buenos Aires |
| 21:15 | | Report | Pizzini 25' 48' | Stadium: Estadio Florencio Sola; Referee: Silvio Trucco |

| July 26, 2014 | Boca Juniors | 0–2 | Huracán | San Juan, Pcia. de San Juan |
| 20:15 | | Report | Ábila 59'; Mancinelli 66' | Stadium: Estadio del Bicentenario; Referee: Darío Herrera |

| August 12, 2014 | Quilmes | 0–4 | Banfield | Avellaneda, Greater Buenos Aires |
| 15:00 | | Report | Cazares 8'; Noguera 25'; Tagliafico 64'; Salcedo 68' | Stadium: Estadio Presidente Perón; Referee: Pablo Lunati |

=== Round of 16 ===
This round had the 16 qualified teams from the Round of 32. The round was contested between August 19 and October 1, in a single knock-out match format. The 8 winning teams advanced to the Quarterfinals.

| August 20, 2014 | River Plate | 0–0 (4–2 p) | Colón | La Punta, Pcia. de San Luis |
| 20:30 | | Report | | Stadium: Estadio Provincial Juan Gilberto Funes; Referee: Luis Alvarez |
| | Penalties |
| | Pisculichi (penalty scored); Ferreyra (penalty scored); Funes Mori (penalty scored); Gutiérrez (penalty missed); Urribarri (penalty scored) | | (penalty scored) Alario; (penalty missed) Callejo; (penalty missed) Pavón; (penalty scored) Garnier |

| September 24, 2014 | Rosario Central | 1–0 | Tigre | Córdoba, Pcia. de Córdoba |
| 15:00 | Abreu 76' | Report | | Stadium: Estadio Juan Domingo Perón; Referee: Alejandro Castro |

| September 18, 2014 | Racing | 0–1 | Argentinos Juniors | Parque Patricios, Buenos Aires |
| 18:25 | | Report | Riquelme 52' | Stadium: Estadio Tomás Adolfo Ducó; Referee: Jorge Baliño |

| August 19, 2014 | Estudiantes (BA) | 1–0 | Instituto | Sarandí, Pcia. de Buenos Aires |
| 15:00 | Sosa 33' | Report | | Stadium: Estadio Julio Humberto Grondona; Referee: Ramiro López |

| September 17, 2014 | San Lorenzo | 1–2 | Defensa y Justicia | Avellaneda, Greater Buenos Aires |
| 19:00 | Cauteruccio 38' | Report | Rius 24'; Prósperi 51' (o.g.) | Stadium: Estadio Presidente Perón; Referee: Diego Ceballos |

| September 9, 2014 | Talleres (C) | 1–2 | Atlético de Rafaela | San Francisco, Pcia. de Córdoba |
| 17:00 | Godoy 85' | Report | Albertengo 53'; Royón 68' | Stadium: Estadio Oscar C.Boero; Referee: Bruno Bocca |

| October 1, 2014 | Estudiantes (LP) | 2–0 | Independiente | San Juan, Pcia. de San Juan |
| 20:30 | Cerutti 75'; Vera 84' | Report | | Stadium: Estadio del Bicentenario; Referee: Diego Abal |

| September 25, 2014 | Huracán | 2–2 (3–2 p) | Banfield | La Paternal, Pcia. de Buenos Aires |
| 16:00 | Martínez 38', 47' | Report | Noguera 33'; Terzaghi 59' | Stadium: Estadio Diego Armando Maradona; Referee: Mauro Giannini |
| | Penalties |
| | Martínez (penalty scored); Mandarino (penalty scored); Arano (penalty missed); Erramuspe (penalty scored) | | (penalty missed) Salcedo; (penalty missed) Erviti; (penalty scored) García; (penalty scored) Servio; (penalty missed) Cazares |

=== Quarterfinals ===
This round had the 8 qualified teams from the Round of 16. The round was contested between October 8 and October 22, in a single knock-out match format. The 4 winning teams advanced to the Semifinals.

| October 9, 2014 | River Plate | 0–0 (4–5 p) | Rosario Central | San Juan, Pcia. de San Juan |
| 20:10 | | Report | | Stadium: Estadio del Bicentenario; Referee: Fernando Echenique |
| | Penalties |
| | Rojas (penalty scored); Mora (penalty scored); Sánchez (penalty scored); Pezzella (penalty scored); Urribarri (penalty missed) | | (penalty scored) Barrientos; (penalty scored) Delgado; (penalty scored) Ferrari; (penalty scored) Caranta; (penalty scored) Abreu |

| October 16, 2014 | Argentinos Juniors | 1–1 (5–4 p) | Estudiantes (BA) | Parque Patricios, Buenos Aires |
| 19:10 | Riquelme 88' (pen.) | Report | Sosa 29' | Stadium: Estadio Tomás Adolfo Ducó; Referee: Nicolás Lamolina |
| | Penalties |
| | Álvarez (penalty scored); Ledesma (penalty scored); Caruzzo (penalty scored); Castillejos (penalty scored); Riquelme (penalty scored) | | (penalty scored) Galván; (penalty scored) Martín; (penalty scored) Ríos; (penalty scored) Álvarez; (penalty missed) Torres |

| October 22, 2014 | Defensa y Justicia | 0–1 | Atlético de Rafaela | Junín, Pcia. de Buenos Aires |
| 18:10 | | Report | González 17' | Stadium: Estadio Eva Perón; Referee: Alejandro Castro |

| October 8, 2014 | Estudiantes (LP) | 1–1 (2–3 p) | Huracán | Formosa, Pcia. de Formosa |
| 19:10 | Cerutti 65' | Report | Ábila 67' | Stadium: Estadio Antonio Romero; Referee: Néstor Pitana |
| | Penalties |
| | Correa (penalty scored); Cerutti (penalty scored); Jara (penalty missed); Carrillo (penalty missed); Vera (penalty missed) | | (penalty scored) Martínez; (penalty missed) Mandarino; (penalty missed) Ábila; (penalty scored) Erramuspe; (penalty scored) Arano |

=== Semifinals ===
This round had the 4 qualified teams from the Quarterfinals. The round was contested on November 19 in a single knock-out match format. The 2 winning teams advanced to the Final.

| November 19, 2014 | Rosario Central | 5–0 | Argentinos Juniors | San Juan, Pcia. de San Juan |
| 22:00 | Abreu 15'; Niell 52'; Donatti 61'; Correa 81'; Encina 90' | Report | | Stadium: Estadio del Bicentenario; Referee: Patricio Loustau |

| November 19, 2014 | Atlético de Rafaela | 0–2 | Huracán | Formosa, Pcia. de Formosa |
| 19:00 | | Report | Mandarino 23'; Abila 70' | Stadium: Estadio Antonio Romero; Referee: Saúl Laverni |

== Final ==
November 25, 2014
20:15 UTC−3

| Rosario Central | 0–0 | Huracán |
|---|---|---|
| | Report |
Penalties
| Barrientos (penalty scored); Delgado (penalty scored); Ferrari (penalty missed); Caranta (penalty missed); Abreu (penalty scored); Correa (penalty scored); Encina (penalty missed) | 4–5 | (penalty missed) Martínez; (penalty scored) Domínguez; (penalty missed) Ábila; (penalty scored) Erramuspe; (penalty scored) Torassa; (penalty scored) Arano; (penalty scored) Mancinelli |

Estadio San Juan del Bicentenario, San Juan
Attendance: 15,000
Referee: Mauro Vigliano

== Top goalscorers ==
Note: Players and teams in bold are still active in the competition.

| Rank | Name | Nationality | Club | Goals |
|---|---|---|---|---|
| 1 | Mariano Gorosito | Argentine | Luján | 5 |
| 1 | Walter Ibáñez | Argentine | Sanjustino | 5 |
| 2 | Martín Carrillo | Argentine | Villa Mitre | 4 |
| 2 | Leandro Ledesma | Argentine | Unión Aconquija | 4 |
| 2 | Javier Molina | Argentine | Deportivo Armenio | 4 |
| 2 | Joaquín Molina | Argentine | Unión (S) | 4 |
| 2 | Rodrigo Olivera | Argentine | Sanjustino | 4 |
| 2 | Antonio Piergüidi | Argentine | Huracán (SR) | 4 |
| 2 | Lucas Saucedo | Argentine | Unión (S) | 4 |
| 2 | Esteban Valatkevicnis | Argentine | Villa Cubas | 4 |
