= 2016 Copa Argentina final =

Argentina football tournament final

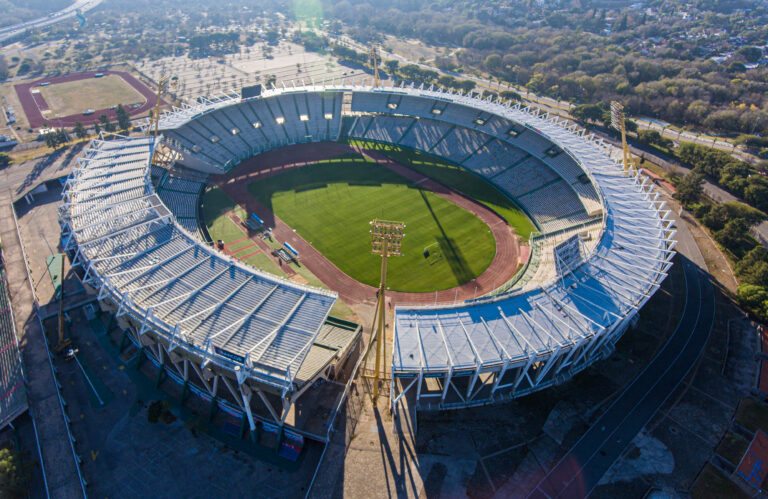
- The match was played at the Estadio Mario Alberto Kempes.
- Event: 2015–16 Copa Argentina
River Plate	Rosario Central
4	3
- Date: December 15, 2016
- Venue: Estadio Mario Alberto Kempes, Córdoba
- Referee: Patricio Loustau
- Attendance: 55,000

The 2016 Copa Argentina final was a football match between River Plate and Rosario Central on 15 December 2016 at the Estadio Mario Alberto Kempes in Córdoba, Argentina. It was the final match of the 2015–16 Copa Argentina, the fifth edition of Argentine football's annual cup competition, organised by the Argentine Football Association (AFA). River Plate were appearing in their first final, while Rosario Central were making their third appearance, after consecutive defeats in the two prior editions of the tournament.

As both teams were in the highest tier of the football league system in Argentina, the Primera División, they entered the competition in the final round. Matches up to the semi-final were contested on a one-off basis, with a penalty shoot-out taking place if any game ended tied after 90 minutes. River Plate's contests varied from close to comfortable victories, while the majority of Rosario Central's matches were close affairs.

Watched by a crowd of 55,000, River Plate took the lead in the first half when Lucas Alario scored through a penalty, awarded by referee Patricio Loustau. Rosario Central turned the game around courtesy of two goals from Damián Musto and Marco Ruben, but Alario once again scored from the spot to make the score 2–2 at half-time. After the restart, Ruben unlevelled the match once more for his team, but two goals in the span of three minutes from Alario and Iván Alonso gave River Plate their first Copa Argentina win.

== Route to the final ==
=== River Plate ===
River Plate's route to the final
Round	Opposition	Score
R64	Sportivo Rivadavia (VT)	3–0
R32	Estudiantes (SL)	2–1
R16	Arsenal	1–0
QF	Unión	3–0
SF	Gimnasia y Esgrima (LP)	2–0

As a Primera División team, River Plate started their Copa Argentina campaign in the Round of 64, being drawn against Torneo Federal B team Sportivo Rivadavia (VT). The match, played at the Estadio Antonio Romero, gave way to an early goal from River Plate when Lucas Alario capitalised on a rebound after a cross by Andrés D'Alessandro. Nearing the end of the first half, Ignacio Fernández extended their lead when he unleashed a shot from outside the 18-yard box. During the final minutes of the game, Gabriel Mercado, on his last match at the club, was given the chance to score from the spot. The right-back converted the penalty to seal the final score of 3–0 and progress through. Their Round of 32 match saw them face Primera B Nacional side Estudiantes (SL) at the Estadio Padre Ernesto Martearena. Férnandez opened the scoring for River Plate at the 34-minute mark, following another long-range shot. This result remained until the 88th minute, when their opposition managed to tie the game through Marcelo Mosset. The match seemed to be heading for a shoot-out, but a Gonzalo Martínez free kick unlevelled the score in favour of River Plate just seconds away from stoppage time.

In the Round of 16, they were paired against fellow Primera División team Arsenal at the Estadio San Juan del Bicentenario. River Plate took the lead in the 53rd minute, when Alario placed a shot next to the left post after a cross from Fernández. They ultimately held this advantage to win the match 1–0 and advance. Their opposition in the quarter-finals were another Primera División side in Unión. Five minutes into the game, held at the Estadio José María Minella, a Sebastián Driussi header off a corner kick yielded River Plate the opening goal. Midway through the second half, Martínez sent another corner kick into the area, which was now connected by Joaquín Arzura to extend their lead. Alario would add one further in injury time, closing out the match with a 3–0 victory. In the semi-finals, they played Primera División team Gimnasia y Esgrima (LP). In the 40th minute, River Plate opened the scoring following a play by Martínez. The attacking midfielder would link up with D'Alessandro, who then found Fernández on the right side. The midfielder proceeded to cross for Driussi, who anticipated his markers to break the deadlock. They added one further just four minutes later, courtesy of an Alario header after a Martínez assist. No other goals were scored, thus sending River Plate into their first Copa Argentina final.

=== Rosario Central ===
Rosario Central's route to the final
Round	Opposition	Score
R64	Villa Mitre	1–0
R32	Atlético de Rafaela	2–2 (3–1 p)
R16	Deportivo Morón	2–0
QF	Boca Juniors	2–1
SF	Belgrano	2–0

Rosario Central also started their campaign in the Round of 64, where they were drawn against Torneo Federal A squad Villa Mitre at the Estadio Eva Perón. The scoreline went unchanged until the 75th minute, when Esteban Burgos scored from a rebound after a Giovani Lo Celso free kick. The result would then remain, sending them through. In the Round of 32, they faced Atlético de Rafaela, a fellow Primera División team. At the Estadio 15 de Abril, Rosario Central opened the scoring in the second minute of play, after Fabián Bordagaray was assisted by Germán Herrera. Their opposition would turn the match around, however, courtesy of goals from Gabriel Gudiño and Mathías Abero. In response, Eduardo Coudet subbed José Luis Fernández in during half-time, who seven minutes from the restart orchestrated a play that was finished by Herrera to tie the game. As neither team managed to score any further goals, a penalty shoout-out took place to determine a winner. Rosario Central came out on top, thanks to goalkeeper Sebastián Sosa, who stopped two opposing penalties.

Their opposition in the Round of 16 were Deportivo Morón, from the Primera B Metropolitana. The match played at the Estadio Padre Ernesto Martearena saw Rosario Central open the scoring in the 53rd minute, when Walter Montoya unleashed a powerful strike from outside the 18-yard box to beat the goalkeeper. They extended their lead in stoppage time, after Teófilo Gutiérrez led a counter-attack that was finished by Marco Ruben. Rosario Central were paired against Boca Juniors in the quarter-finals, with the Estadio Mario Alberto Kempes to be the venue for the match. The game was to be a rematch of the 2015 final, which was won by Boca Juniors. Rosario Central would take a two goal lead in the first half, following a volley from Fernández and a follow up strike by Herrera. Their opposition found the net in injury time, but were unable to tie the game. As a result, they advanced into the semi-finals, where they met their third Primera División opponent in Belgrano. At the Estadio Antonio Romero, Rosario Central opened the scoring in the 71st minute, after Ruben headed a cross from Gutiérrez. They extended their lead 20 minutes later, when the Colombian striker assisted Montoya; the midfielder took a shot on an empty net to send his team into their third consecutive Copa Argentina final.

== Background ==
The Argentine Football Association (AFA) established the Copa Argentina in May 2011, as the national cup competition for the 2011–2012 Argentine football season. Since its inaugural edition, it has been held annually, albeit undergoing several format changes over the years.

The match was River Plate's first appearance in a Copa Argentina final. In turn, Rosario Central were appearing for the third consecutive time. They were looking to win their first title, after sustaining losses in the two prior editions of the competition. They had first lost the 2014 final against Huracán, when the penalty shoot-out went in favour of their opposition 5–4 following a goalless game. In the next edition of the tournament, the 2014–15 Copa Argentina, they reached the final again, losing to Boca Juniors 2–0.

It was the third meeting between the two sides in the competition; both of the previous contests had been won by Rosario Central. They first knocked River Plate out in the quarter-finals of the 2013–14 Copa Argentina, when they won 5–4 on penalties after a scoreless draw. In the following season, they beat them 2–0 in the Round of 32.

Both teams had played their last match before the final on 11 December. Rosario Central suffered a 2–1 defeat against Lanús at the Estadio Gigante de Arroyito. River Plate followed a similar suit, as they sustained a 4–2 loss to Boca Juniors at the Estadio Monumental. The most recent meeting between the two sides was on 21 February, during the 2016 Argentine Primera División, which ended tied 3–3.

== Match ==
=== Summary ===
==== First half ====
From the start of the match, both sides displayed an aggressive approach, causing the match to became a frantic affair. Early on, River Plate's Leonardo Ponzio brought down Colombian striker Teófilo Gutiérrez after a struggle, but the action went unnoticed by referee Patricio Loustau. In the eighth minute, he awarded a penalty on the other side of the field. Andrés D'Alessandro passed to Lucas Alario who, following a header, left Ignacio Fernández in front of the net. Before the midfielder could unveil a shot, however, he was tackled by Damián Musto. Alario stepped up and converted from the spot to put his team ahead. Around the 25-minute mark, a Walter Montoya corner kick was cleared away by Alario. The ball fell to Víctor Salazar, who sent a cross into the box that was challenged by Musto and goalkeeper Augusto Batalla; the midfielder won the challenge, albeit controlling the ball with his elbow, and scored on an empty net for the equaliser. Just four minutes later, Rosario Central took the lead after Montoya drove a counter-attack. The play was followed up by Gutiérrez, who received the ball and assisted Ruben in the scoring of their second goal, after the striker controlled the delivery and beat Batalla to turn the game around. A follow up penalty was given to River Plate in the 37th minute, after Jorge Moreira passed over to Alario, who was tugged by Dylan Gissi inside the area. The striker took the spot kick once again, sending goalkeeper Sebastián Sosa the wrong way and tying the match.

==== Second half ====
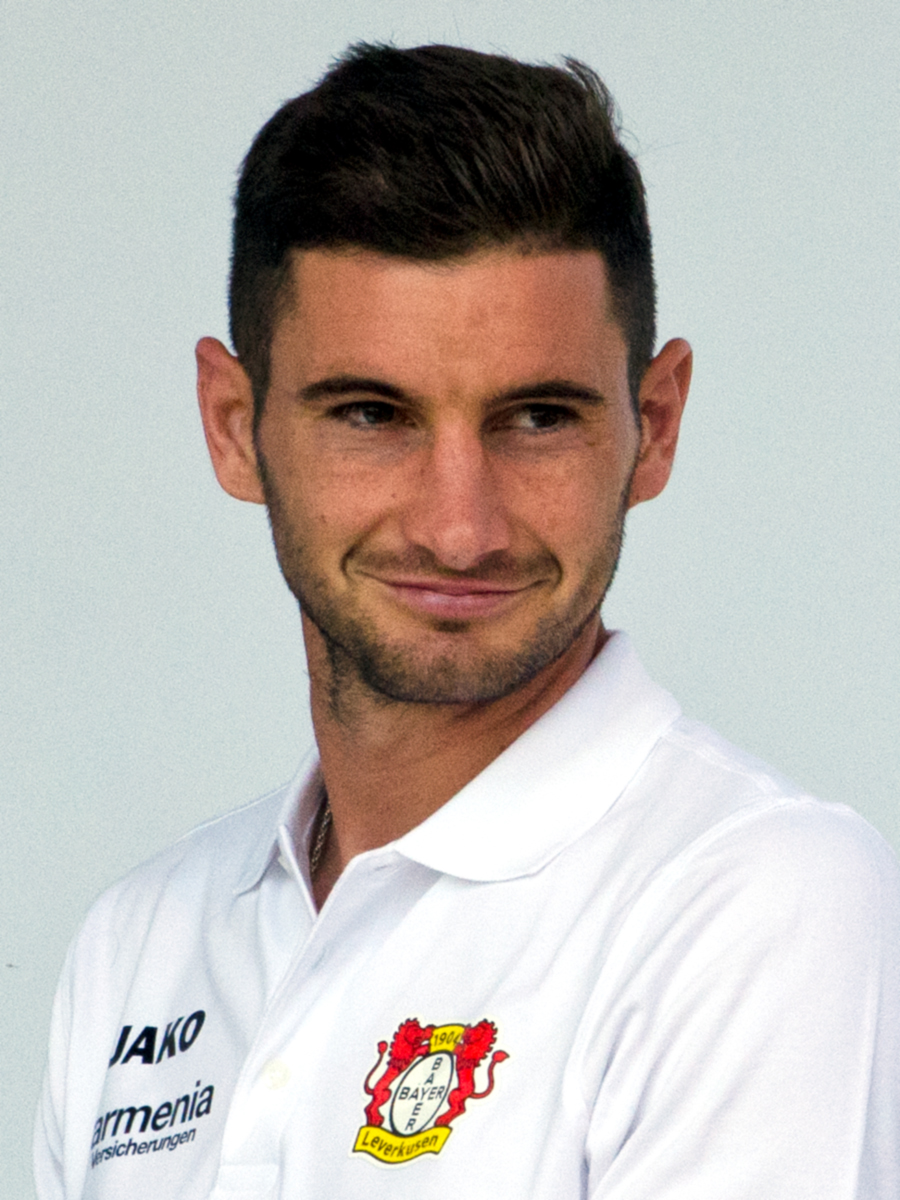
Lucas Alario was instrumental in the River Plate victory, contributing to all four of his team’s goals.

The closing half would also unfold intensely, as both teams had multiple opportunities to get ahead. The first clear chance occurred after midfielder Giovanni Lo Celso orchestrated a play from the left side. The play ultimately came to a finish when José Luis Fernández crossed for Gutiérrez, who could only muster a weak shot on target. Around midway of the second half, Lo Celso orchestrated another play, that time from the right. The ball eventually fell to Jonás Aguirre, who unveiled a shot across goal. Although his strike was weak, Batalla was unable to get ahold of it and Ruben chimed in to tap the ball into the net, retaking the lead in the 63rd minute. Five minutes later, they had a chance to extend their lead following a mistake by River Plate's Fernández. Lo Celso was given the opportunity to capitalize upon it, but the midfielder squandered it, as he unleashed a shot right into goalkeeper Batalla. At the 71-minute mark, River Plate manager Marcelo Gallardo subbed in forwards Iván Alonso and Rodrigo Mora for D'Alessandro and Gonzalo Martínez. The changes yielded them a difference when, just a minute later, Moreira crossed into the box from a throw-in, finding Alonso, who headed the ball over to Alario for the striker to tie the game. Three minutes later, Mora crossed for Alario, who assisted Alonso in the scoring of their fourth goal. Ruben was later shown a red card after he attacked Lucas Martínez Quarta. In the 89-minute, Alario had a chance to extend their lead, but he was denied by the crossbar. Shortly after, Rosario Central had their last opportunity to even the match, but a shot from Germán Herrera was blocked by the defence. As a result, the game ended 4–3 to River Plate, who won their first Copa Argentina title.

=== Details ===
December 15, 2016
21:10 UTC−3

River Plate	4–3	Rosario Central
Alario 11' (pen.), 40' (pen.), 72'; Alonso 75'	Report	Musto 26'; Ruben 30', 63'

Estadio Mario Alberto Kempes, Córdoba
Attendance: 55,000
Referee: Patricio Loustau

River Plate	Rosario Central

GK	1	(Argentina) Augusto Batalla
RB	4	(Paraguay) Jorge Moreira
CB	2	(Argentina) Jonathan Maidana	(yellow card) 45+2'
CB	28	(Argentina) Lucas Martínez Quarta
LB	30	(Argentina) Luis Olivera	(yellow card) 41'
CM	26	(Argentina) Ignacio Fernández
CM	23	(Argentina) Leonardo Ponzio (c)		(substituted off) 82'
AM	22	(Argentina) Andrés D'Alessandro	(yellow card) 32'	(substituted off) 71'
AM	10	(Argentina) Gonzalo Martínez		(substituted off) 71'
CF	11	(Argentina) Sebastián Driussi
CF	13	(Argentina) Lucas Alario
Substitutes:
GK	25	(Argentina) Enrique Bologna
DF	3	(Ecuador) Arturo Mina
MF	18	(Uruguay) Camilo Mayada
MF	21	(Argentina) Iván Rossi
MF	14	(Argentina) Joaquín Arzura		(substituted on) 82'
FW	7	(Uruguay) Rodrigo Mora		(substituted on) 71'
FW	19	(Uruguay) Iván Alonso		(substituted on) 71'
Manager:
(Argentina) Marcelo Gallardo

GK	1	(Uruguay) Sebastián Sosa
RB	32	(Argentina) Víctor Salazar		(substituted off) 86'
CB	14	(Switzerland) Dylan Gissi	(yellow card) 13'
CB	6	(Argentina) Marco Torsiglieri	(yellow card) 90+1'
LB	27	(Argentina) Jonás Aguirre
RM	8	(Argentina) Walter Montoya	(yellow card) 86'
DM	5	(Argentina) Damián Musto	(yellow card) 10'
LM	11	(Argentina) José Luis Fernández		(substituted off) 76'
AM	10	(Argentina) Giovani Lo Celso		(substituted off) 77'
CF	29	(Colombia) Teófilo Gutiérrez
CF	9	(Argentina) Marco Ruben (c)	(yellow card) 32' (red card) 84'
Substitutes:
GK	21	(Argentina) Diego Rodríguez
DF	3	(Uruguay) Hernán Menosse
DF	4	(Argentina) Paulo Ferrari
MF	15	(Uruguay) Washington Camacho		(substituted on) 76'
MF	16	(Argentina) Mauricio Martínez		(substituted on) 86'
MF	20	(Argentina) Gustavo Colman
FW	17	(Argentina) Germán Herrera		(substituted on) 77'
Manager:
(Argentina) Eduardo Coudet

Assistant referees
Hernán Maidana
Diego Bonfá
Fourth official
Mauro Vigliano

Match rules

- 90 minutes
- No extra time
- Penalty shoot-out if necessary
- Seven named substitutes, of which up to three may be used

=== Statistics ===
Overall
Statistic	River Plate	Rosario Central
Goals scored	4	3
Total shots	11	13
Shots on target	7	10
Ball possession	52%	48%
Corner kicks	0	4
Fouls committed	13	23
Offsides	1	3
Yellow cards	3	5
Red cards	0	1

== Post-match ==
The hat-trick scored by Lucas Alario in the final allowed the striker to top the goalscorer list of the 2015–16 Copa Argentina, as he totalized seven goals over six matches. He addressed this feat in a later interview: "I could have never imagined of scoring three times in a final, but I do always dream of doing my best to help the team. The goal this season was to win a title, and we achieved it. We were efficient with the chances we created."

The winning strike for River Plate was courtesy of Iván Alonso, who was brought to the team by Marcelo Gallardo, after the manager saw in the Uruguayan an experienced striker that could help out as a substitute. Alonso reflected on the final a year later, stating: "It was an unforgettable moment; I get goosebumps whenever I see the images. I think it was the perfect ending to my career." He added further: "[The fourth goal] is in the top three goals of my career."

Rosario Central's Eduardo Coudet resigned as coach of the team following the loss. He announced his departure in the press conference held after the match: "I've decided to step aside. I'm grateful to this club, which gave me the opportunity to coach. We've had two great years working together. I've been given everything, and along with the coaching staff, we've given it our all. I apologize to the fans for not being able to top it off."

River Plate qualified to the 2017 Copa Libertadores as winners of the 2015–16 Copa Argentina. They would also finish the 2016–17 Argentine Primera División in second place, outcome that yielded them a spot in the 2018 Copa Libertadores. Rosario Central finished in 12th position of the league, and thus gained qualification to the 2018 Copa Sudamericana.

== See also ==
- 2016 Argentine Primera División
- 2016 Supercopa Argentina
- 2017 Copa Libertadores
