= 2014 Copa Argentina Final =

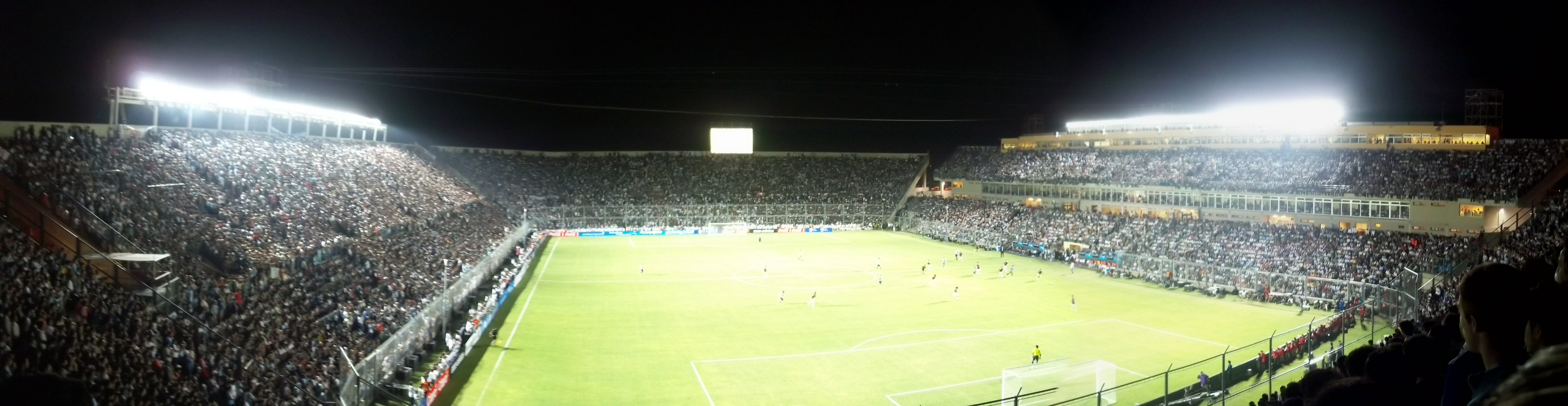
- Estadio del Bicentenario, venue
- Event: 2013–14 Copa Argentina
Rosario Central	Huracán
0	0
- Huracán won 5–4 on penalties
- Date: November 26, 2014
- Venue: Estadio del Bicentenario, San Juan
- Referee: Mauro Vigliano

2014 Copa Argentina Final was the 257th and final match of the 2013–14 Copa Argentina. It was played on November 26, 2014, at the Estadio del Bicentenario between Rosario Central and Huracán. Huracán won the tournament beating Rosario Central on penalties to win their first Copa Argentina title.

By winning the competition, Huracán won the right to play the 2015 Copa Libertadores, and the 2014 Supercopa Argentina.

== Qualified teams ==
Team	Previous finals app.
Rosario Central	None
Huracán	None

=== Road to the final ===
Rosario Central			Round	Huracán		
Opponent	Venue	Score		Opponent	Venue	Score
Bye			Final Round I	Bye		
Bye			Final Round II	Crucero del Norte	Sarandí	2–2 (3–2 p)
Juventud Unida Universitario	Córdoba	3–1	Round of 32	Boca Juniors	San Juan	2–0
Tigre	Córdoba	1–0	Round of 16	Banfield	Buenos Aires	2–2 (3–2 p)
River Plate	San Juan	0–0 (5–4 p)	Quarterfinals	Estudiantes (LP)	Formosa	1–1 (3–2 p)
Argentinos Juniors	San Juan	5–0	Semifinals	Atlético de Rafaela	Formosa	2–0

== Match ==
=== Details ===
2013–14 Copa Argentina Final
November 26, 2014
20:15 (UTC−03:00)

Rosario Central	0–0	Huracán
	Report
Penalties
Barrientos (penalty scored); Delgado (penalty scored); Ferrari (penalty missed); Caranta (penalty missed); Abreu (penalty scored); Correa (penalty scored); Encina (penalty missed)	4–5	(penalty missed) Martínez; (penalty scored) Domínguez; (penalty missed) Ábila; (penalty scored) Erramuspe; (penalty scored) Torassa; (penalty scored) Arano; (penalty scored) Mancinelli

Estadio del Bicentenario, San Juan
Referee: Mauro Vigliano

Rosario Central	Huracán

GK	1	(Argentina) Mauricio Caranta
DF	4	(Argentina) Paulo Ferrari (c)
DF	26	(Colombia) Yeimar Gómez
DF	2	(Argentina) Alejandro Donatti
DF	3	(Argentina) Rafael Delgado
MF	7	(Argentina) Hernán Encina
MF	5	(Argentina) Damián Musto
MF	8	(Argentina) Fernando Barrientos
MF	11	(Argentina) Pablo Becker	(substituted off) 46'
MF	22	(Argentina) Franco Niell	(substituted off) 82'
FW	20	(Colombia) José Adolfo Valencia	(substituted off) 68'
Substitutes:
GK	12	(Argentina) Manuel García
DF	25	(Argentina) Lucas Acevedo
DF	14	(Argentina) Lucas Lazo
MF	23	(Argentina) Nery Domínguez
FW	17	(Argentina) Javier Correa	(substituted on) 82'
FW	10	(Argentina) Antonio Medina	(substituted on) 46'
FW	13	(Uruguay) Sebastián Abreu	(substituted on) 68'
Manager:
(Argentina) Miguel Ángel Russo

GK	1	(Argentina) Marcos Díaz
DF	2	(Argentina) Federico Mancinelli	(yellow card) 69'
DF	4	(Argentina) Rodrigo Erramuspe
DF	6	(Argentina) Eduardo Domínguez (c)
DF	3	(Argentina) Carlos Arano
MF	8	(Argentina) Lucas Villarruel		(substituted off) 73'
MF	5	(Argentina) Federico Vismara
MF	10	(Argentina) Gonzalo Martínez
MF	11	(Argentina) Patricio Toranzo		(substituted off) 85'
FW	7	(Argentina) Cristian Espinoza		(substituted off) 77'
FW	9	(Argentina) Ramón Ábila
Substitutes:
GK	12	(Argentina) Matías Giordano
DF	13	(Argentina) Guillermo Sotelo
MF	16	(Argentina) Ezequiel Gallegos		(substituted on) 73'
MF	15	(Argentina) Iván Moreno y Fabianesi
MF	17	(Argentina) Kaku		(substituted on) 85'
FW	14	(Argentina) Agustín Torassa		(substituted on) 77'
FW	18	(Argentina) Cristian Milla
Manager:
(Argentina) Néstor Apuzzo

Assistant referees:
Cristian Navarro
Ariel Scime
Fourth official:
Fernando Espinoza

Match rules

- 90 minutes
- No extra time
- Penalty shoot-out if scores are level
- Seven named substitutes
- Maximum of three substitutions

=== Statistics ===
Overall
	Rosario Central	Huracán
Goals scored	0	0
Total shots	8	12
Shots on target	2	4
Ball possession	54%	46%
Corner kicks	3	3
Fouls committed	10	11
Offsides	2	1
Yellow cards	0	1
Red cards	0	0
