= 2009–10 Club Atlético River Plate season =

Club Atlético River Plate
2009–10 season
- Chairman: Daniel Alberto Passarella
- Manager: Angel Cappa
- Primera División: Apertura: 14th Clausura: 13th
- Copa Sudamericana: First Stage
- Copa Libertadores: Second Stage
- Edmonton Cup: Winners
- Carlsberg Cup: Winners
- Top goalscorer: League: Apertura: Diego Buonanotte (8); Clausura: Paulo Ferrari & Rogelio Funes Mori (4 each); All: Diego Buonanotte (9)
- Biggest win: River 3–0 Universidad de San Martin; Racing Club 0–3 River
- Biggest defeat: River 1–5 Tigre
Home colours	Away colours	Third colours

The 2009–10 season is C.A. River Plate's 80th season in Primera División Argentina.

== Apertura Squad ==
Note: Flags indicate national team as defined under FIFA eligibility rules; some limited exceptions apply. Players may hold more than one non-FIFA nationality.

No.	Pos.	Nation	Player
1	GK	ARG	Daniel Vega
2	DF	PAR	Javier Cohene
3	DF	ARG	Cristian Villagra
4	DF	ARG	Paulo Ferrari
5	MF	ARG	Oscar Ahumada
6	DF	ARG	Nicolás Sánchez
7	FW	ARG	Mauro Rosales
8	MF	ARG	Rodrigo Archubi
10	FW	ARG	Ariel Ortega (Vice-Captain)
11	MF	ARG	Marcelo Gallardo (Captain)
12	GK	ARG	Leandro Chichizola
13	DF	ARG	Germán Pezzella
14	MF	ARG	Nicolas Domingo
16	DF	ARG	Maximiliano Coronel
17	FW	ARG	Andres Rios
18	FW	ARG	Rogelio Funes Mori

No.	Pos.	Nation	Player
19	MF	ARG	Diego Barrado
20	DF	ARG	Mateo Musacchio
21	MF	ARG	Martin Galmarini
22	FW	ARG	Gustavo Bou
23	FW	ARG	Cristian Fabbiani
24	DF	ARG	Gustavo Cabral
25	MF	ARG	Matias Almeyda (3rd Captain)
27	GK	ARG	Nicolas Navarro
28	MF	ARG	Augusto Fernandez
29	MF	ARG	Mauro Diaz
30	MF	ARG	Diego Buonanotte
34	FW	ARG	Daniel Villalva
37	MF	ARG	Roberto Pereyra
38	MF	ARG	Matias Abelairas
39	MF	ARG	Erik Lamela

== Clausura Squad ==
Note: Flags indicate national team as defined under FIFA eligibility rules; some limited exceptions apply. Players may hold more than one non-FIFA nationality.

No.	Pos.	Nation	Player
1	GK	ARG	Daniel Vega
2	DF	ARG	Alexis Ferrero
3	DF	ARG	Cristian Villagra
4	DF	ARG	Paulo Ferrari
5	MF	ARG	Oscar Ahumada
6	DF	ARG	Nicolás Sánchez
7	FW	ARG	Mauro Rosales
8	MF	PAR	Juan Rodrigo Rojas
9	FW	ARG	Rogelio Funes Mori
10	FW	ARG	Ariel Ortega (Vice-Captain)
11	MF	ARG	Marcelo Gallardo (Captain)
12	GK	ARG	Marcelo Ojeda
13	DF	URU	Juan Manuel Díaz
14	MF	ARG	Ezequiel Cirigliano
15	MF	ARG	Facundo Affranchino

No.	Pos.	Nation	Player
16	DF	ARG	Maximiliano Coronel
18	FW	CHI	Gustavo Canales
19	MF	ARG	Diego Barrado
22	FW	ARG	Gustavo Bou
23	DF	ARG	German Pezzella
24	DF	ARG	Gustavo Cabral
25	MF	ARG	Matias Almeyda (3rd Captain)
27	GK	ARG	Nicolas Navarro
29	MF	ARG	Mauro Diaz
30	MF	ARG	Diego Buonanotte
34	FW	ARG	Daniel Villalva
37	MF	ARG	Roberto Pereyra
38	MF	ARG	Matias Abelairas
39	MF	ARG	Erik Lamela

== Competitions ==
=== Overall ===
Competition	Final position	First match	Last match	Final Place
Torneo Apertura	14th	August 23, 2009	December 13, 2009	Argentina - Coliseo de Victoria
Torneo Clausura	13th	January 31, 2010	May 15, 2010	Argentina - El Monumental
Copa Sudamericana	First Stage	August 19, 2009	September 17, 2009	Argentina - Estadio Ciudad de Lanús - Néstor Díaz Pérez
Copa Libertadores	Second Stage	February 12, 2009	April 30, 2009	Argentina - El Monumental
Carlsberg Cup 2009	Winner	July 22, 2009		Canada - BMO Field
Edmonton Cup	Winner	July 25, 2009		Canada - Commonwealth Stadium
Copa Desafío	Winner	January 20, 2010		Argentina - Estadio José María Minella
Copa Revancha	Winner	January 24, 2010		Argentina - Estadio Malvinas Argentinas

== Apertura ==
Pos	Team	Pld	W	D	L	GF	GA	GD	Pts
12	Arsenal	19	7	6	6	20	24	−4	27
13	Atlético Tucumán	19	6	4	9	24	32	−8	22
14	River Plate	19	5	6	8	23	26	−3	21
15	Chacarita Juniors	19	5	4	10	18	25	−7	19
16	Racing	19	4	5	10	17	26	−9	17

Rules for classification: 1st points; 2nd goal difference; 3rd goals scored; 4th head-to-head points; 5th head-to-head goal difference; 6th head-to-head goals scored. This does not apply to determining the champion. If two or more teams had been tied in point at the end of the tournament, a playoff would have been held at a neutral venue within 72 hours for the championship

=== Matches ===
August 23, 2009 Round 1	Banfield	2–0	River Plate	Buenos Aires, Argentina
17:10	Silva 2'; Fernández 32'	Report		Stadium: Estadio Florencio Sola; Referee: Diego Abal

August 30, 2009 Round 2	River Plate	4–3	Chacarita Juniors	Buenos Aires, Argentina
13:10	Buonanotte 5'; Cabral 32'; Villalba 68'; Ortega 87'	Report	Alustiza 22', 45'; Parra 53'	Stadium: Estadio Monumental Antonio Vespucio Liberti; Referee: Rafael Furchi

September 8, 2009 Round 3	Rosario Central	2–1	River Plate	Rosario, Argentina
19:15	Burdisso 16'; Castillejos 52'	Report	Díaz 72'	Stadium: Estadio Gigante de Arroyito; Referee: Federico Beligoy

September 13, 2009 Round 4	River Plate	0–0	Colón	Buenos Aires, Argentina
15:10		Report		Stadium: Estadio Monumental Antonio Vespucio Liberti; Referee: Gabriel Favale

September 20, 2009 Round 5	Arsenal	1–0	River Plate	Buenos Aires, Argentina
19:10	Álvarez 9'	Report		Stadium: Estadio Julio Humberto Grondona; Referee: Cristian Faraoni

September 27, 2009 Round 6	River Plate	2–2	Gimnasia La Plata	Buenos Aires, Argentina
17:10	Villalba 42'; Buonanotte 52'	Report	Ormeño 73'; Cuevas 87'	Stadium: Estadio Monumental Antonio Vespucio Liberti; Referee: Pablo Lunati

October 4, 2009 Round 7	San Lorenzo	2–1	River Plate	Buenos Aires, Argentina
15:10	Romagnoli 83'; Romeo 86'	Report	Buonanotte 27'	Stadium: Estadio Pedro Bidegain; Referee: Saul Laverni

October 12, 2009 Round 8	River Plate	1–3	Independiente	Buenos Aires, Argentina
15:05	Gallardo 90' (pen.)	Report	Gandín 11'; Piatti 29'; Silvera 33'	Stadium: Estadio Monumental Antonio Vespucio Liberti; Referee: Pablo Lunati

October 18, 2009 Round 9	Huracán	0–0	River Plate	Buenos Aires, Argentina
15:10		Report		Stadium: Estadio Tomás Adolfo Ducó; Referee: Juan Pablo Pompei

October 25, 2009 Round 10	River Plate	1–1	Boca Juniors	Buenos Aires, Argentina
15:15	Gallardo 29'	Report	Palermo 63'	Stadium: Estadio Monumental Antonio Vespucio Liberti; Referee: Saul Laverni

October 29, 2009 Round 11	Argentinos Juniors	1–2	River Plate	Buenos Aires, Argentina
	Ortigoza 90' (pen.)	Report	Buonanotte 30'; Rosales 79'	Stadium: Estadio Diego Armando Maradona; Referee: Federico Beligoy

November 1, 2009 Round 12	River Plate	0–1	Lanús	Buenos Aires, Argentina
14:10		Report	Velázquez 31'	Stadium: Estadio Monumental Antonio Vespucio Liberti; Referee: Luis Alvarez

November 7, 2009 Round 13	Newell's Old Boys	2–1	River Plate	Rosario, Argentina
16:10	Boghossian 4', 79'	Report	Buonanotte 63'	Stadium: Estadio Marcelo Bielsa; Referee: Javier Collado

November 15, 2009 Round 14	River Plate	3–1	Atlético Tucumán	Buenos Aires, Argentina
17:10	Gallardo 70'; Buonanotte 74'; Villalba 76'	Report	Gigliotti 1'	Stadium: Estadio Monumental Antonio Vespucio Liberti; Referee: Mauro Giannini

November 22, 2009 Round 15	Godoy Cruz	1–1	River Plate	Mendoza, Argentina
19:35	Rojas 47'	Report	Rosales 3'	Stadium: Estadio Malvinas Argentinas; Referee: Nestor Pittana

November 28, 2009 Round 16	River Plate	1–1	Estudiantes	Buenos Aires, Argentina
17:10	Ortega 90+2'	Report	Desábato 31'	Stadium: Estadio Monumental Antonio Vespucio Liberti; Referee: Federico Beligoy

December 6, 2009 Round 17	Vélez Sarsfield	3–1	River Plate	Buenos Aires, Argentina
15:00	Moralez 31'; López 83'; Zárate 90'	Report	Díaz 76'	Stadium: Estadio José Amalfitani; Referee: Nestor Pittana

December 10, 2009 Round 18	River Plate	2–0	Racing Club	Buenos Aires, Argentina
19:24	Buonanotte 31' (pen.); Abelairas 40'	Report		Stadium: Estadio Monumental Antonio Vespucio Liberti; Referee: Diego Abal

December 13, 2009 Round 19	Tigre	0–2	River Plate	Buenos Aires, Argentina
17:45		Report	Funes Mori 45'; Buonanotte 58'	Stadium: Estadio José Dellagiovanna; Referee: Nestor Pittana

== Clausura ==
Pos	Team	Pld	W	D	L	GF	GA	GD	Pts
11	Tigre	19	7	3	9	28	26	+2	24
12	Gimnasia y Esgrima (LP)	19	6	6	7	21	29	−8	24
13	River Plate	19	6	4	9	16	21	−5	22
14	Colón	19	4	9	6	20	32	−12	21
15	San Lorenzo	19	6	2	11	16	21	−5	20

Rules for classification: 1st points; 2nd goal difference; 3rd goals scored; 4th head-to-head points; 5th head-to-head goal difference; 6th head-to-head goals scored. This does not apply to determining the champion. If two or more teams are tied in point at the end of the tournament, a playoff will be held at a neutral venue within 72 hours for the championship
