= Juan Matías Fischer =

Argentine footballer

Juan Fischer
Personal information
- Full name: Juan Matías Fischer
- Date of birth: 12 February 1985 (age 41)
- Place of birth: Junín, Argentina
- Height: 1.75 m (5 ft 9 in)
- Position: Forward

Youth career
- B.A.P.
- River Plate Junín
- 1999–2003: Boca Juniors

Senior career*
| Years | Team | Apps | (Gls) |
| 2004–2006 | Boca Juniors | 2 | (0) |
| 2005 | → Bolívar (loan) | 37 | (27) |
| 2006 | → Nueva Chicago (loan) | 5 | (0) |
| 2007 | Chacarita Juniors | 15 | (2) |
| 2007–2008 | Almirante Brown | 12 | (1) |
| 2008–2010 | Sarmiento | 64 | (15) |
| 2010–2011 | Deportivo Español | 21 | (1) |
| 2011 | Estudiantes de Mérida | 9 | (3) |
| 2012 | Unión Temuco | 17 | (3) |
| 2013 | Talleres RdE | 9 | (0) |
| 2013–2015 | Deportivo Camioneros | 52 | (18) |
- * Club domestic league appearances and goals

Juan Matías Fischer (born February 12, 1985, in Junín, Buenos Aires Province, Argentina) is an Argentine former footballer who played as a forward.

== Teams ==
- (Argentina) B.A.P. (youth)
- (Argentina) River Plate Junín (youth)
- (Argentina) Boca Juniors (youth)
- (Argentina) Boca Juniors 2004–2006
- (Bolivia) Bolivar (loan) 2005
- (Argentina) Nueva Chicago (loan) 2006
- (Argentina) Chacarita Juniors 2007
- (Argentina) Almirante Brown 2007–2008
- (Argentina) Sarmiento 2008–2010
- (Argentina) Deportivo Español 2010–2011
- (Venezuela) Estudiantes de Mérida 2011
- (Chile) Unión Temuco 2012
- (Argentina) Talleres RdE 2013
- (Argentina) Deportivo Camioneros 2013–2015

== Personal life ==
Fischer is nicknamed Lobito (Little Wolf) like Rodolfo Fischer, nicknamed Lobo (Wolf).
