= Orlando Gaona =

Paraguayan footballer (born 1990)

Personal information
- Full name: Orlando Gabriel Gaona Lugo
- Date of birth: 25 July 1990 (age 36)
- Place of birth: Villa Hayes, Paraguay
- Height: 1.73 m (5 ft 8 in)
- Position: Winger

Team information
- Current team: Nacional
- Number: 33

Youth career
- Club 29 de Setiembre
- Gimnasia y Esgrima de Clorinda
- Boca Juniors

Senior career*
Years	Team	Apps	(Gls)
2010–2013	Boca Juniors	11	(0)
2013–2014	→ Olimpo (loan)	0	(0)
2014–2017	Olimpo	53	(1)
2018	Olimpia	1	(0)
2018–2019	Guaraní	29	(0)
2020	Sportivo Luqueño	23	(4)
2021–2022	Nacional	69	(5)
2023	Deportivo Municipal	5	(0)
2023–	Nacional	79	(8)

International career
2011	Paraguay	3	(0)
- * Club domestic league appearances and goals as of 13 August 2025

Orlando Gabriel Gaona Lugo (born 25 July 1990) is a Paraguayan footballer who plays for Club Nacional.

== Career ==
Gaona signed with Argentine Primera División side Boca Juniors as a youth, but has only made a few appearances with the first team. Paraguayan side Club Olimpia has discussed a transfer but Boca Juniors is unwilling to release him from his contract.

== Honours ==
Boca Juniors

- Primera División: 2

2011 Apertura
2011–12 Copa Argentina
