= Club Atlético Adelante =

Argentine sports club

Adelante
- Full name: Club Atlético Adelante Reconquista
- Nickname(s): El Rojo
- Founded: 10 January 1919; 106 years ago
- Ground: Estadio 10 de Enero, Reconquista, Santa Fe, Argentina
- Capacity: 10,000
- Chairman: Alberto Bullati
- League: Torneo Argentino B
- Website: http://www.clubadelante.com.ar/
Home colours	Away colours

Club Atlético Adelante Reconquista is an Argentine sports club from Reconquista, Santa Fe. Its football team currently plays in the Torneo Argentino B, the regionalised fourth division of the Argentine football league system.

Adelante was founded in 1919 as a football club, but the institution has expanded into several different sports, including basketball, tennis, rugby union, figure skating, tabletennis, paddle, volleyball, chess and martial arts. The club has many female teams and youth academies.

The club's basketball team plays in the Torneo Nacional de Ascenso (TNA), the second division of the Argentine league system.

== Players ==
Note: Flags indicate national team as defined under FIFA eligibility rules; some limited exceptions apply. Players may hold more than one non-FIFA nationality.

No.	Pos.	Nation	Player
—	POR	ARG	Sebastián Perez
—	DEF	ARG	Juan Villasboas
—	DEL	ARG	Cristian Rivero
—	DEF	ARG	Danilo Zanabria
—	MED	ARG	Pablo Wittwer
—	DEF	ARG	Martín Vázquez

No.	Pos.	Nation	Player
—	MED	ARG	Fernando Paredes
—	MED	ARG	Nery Solari
—	DEL	ARG	Carlos Nadalich (C)
—	MED	ARG	Franco Truya
—	DEL	ARG	Lucas Capelletti
