= Edmonton Cup =

Tournament details
- Host country: Canada
- Dates: 21 July 2010
- Teams: 2 (from 2 confederations)
- Venue: 1 (in 1 host city)

Final positions
- Champions: (England) Portsmouth (1st title)
- Runners-up: (Canada) FC Edmonton

Tournament statistics
- Matches played: 1
- Goals scored: 2 (2 per match)
- Top scorer(s): (Turkey) Nadir Çiftçi (1 goal) (Canada) Chris Lemire

The Edmonton Cup was a one-game association football tournament with only one edition, which took place in Edmonton, Alberta, Canada.

The first game took place on 25 July 2009 between the Argentine club River Plate and the English club Everton at Commonwealth Stadium in Edmonton, Alberta, Canada, to celebrate the 100th anniversary of Alberta Soccer Association. The latest match took place on 21 July 2010 between FC Edmonton and the English club Portsmouth and was played at the Commonwealth Stadium.

== Match ==
25 July 2009
19:30 UTC−7

| River Plate (Argentina) | 1–0 | (England) Everton |
|---|---|---|
| Ortega 27' | (Report) |

Commonwealth Stadium, Edmonton, Alberta, Canada
Attendance: 15,800
21 July 2010
19:30 UTC−7

| Portsmouth (England) | 1–1 (a.e.t.) | (Canada) FC Edmonton |
|---|---|---|
| Nadir Çiftçi 39' | (Report) | Chris Lemire 5' |
Penalties
| | 5–4 |

Commonwealth Stadium, Edmonton, Alberta, Canada
Attendance: 8,792
