= Club Atlético Las Palmas =

Las Palmas
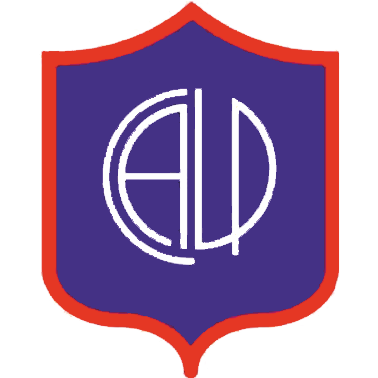
- Full name: Club Atlético Las Palmas
- Nickname(s): Los Azules
- Founded: November 10 of 1933
- Ground: Estadio Las Palmas – Avenida Ramón Garcia Martínez esquina San Luis – Barrio Las Palmas
- Capacity: 10,000
- Chairman: Don Hugo Chiatti
- League: Torneo Argentino B
- 2013–14: 2nd
- Website: http://www.clublaspalmas.org.ar/
Away colours

Club Atlético Las Palmas is a sports club, located in Córdoba, Argentina. Although other sports are practised there (including basketball, tennis, and hockey) the club is mostly known for its football team, which currently plays in the regionalised 4th level of Argentine football league system, the Torneo Argentino B.

== See also ==
- List of football clubs in Argentina
- Argentine football league system
