= Federico Mancinelli =

Argentine footballer (born 1982)

Personal information
- Date of birth: 8 May 1982 (age 44)
- Place of birth: Bahía Blanca, Argentina
- Height: 1.81 m (5 ft 11 1/2 in)
- Position: Centre-back

Team information
- Current team: Guillermo Brown

Senior career*
Years	Team	Apps	(Gls)
1998–2003	Tiro Federal		
2003–2005	Rosario Puerto Belgrano		
2005–2006	Villa Mitre	30	(2)
2006–2008	Olimpo	52	(2)
2008–2010	Mérida	59	(5)
2010–2011	Atlante UTN	13	(0)
2011–2012	Olimpo	17	(0)
2012–2019	Huracán	155	(2)
2019–2020	Patronato	18	(0)
2020–2021	Sarmiento	22	(0)
2022–	Guillermo Brown	21	(0)
- * Club domestic league appearances and goals as of 20:08, 24 July 2022 (UTC)

Federico Mancinelli (born 8 May 1982) is an Argentine professional footballer who plays as a centre-back for Guillermo Brown.

== Career ==
Mancinelli's senior footballing career began in 1998 with Tiro Federal, which preceded a move to Rosario Puerto Belgrano five years later. 2005 saw Mancinelli join Villa Mitre of Torneo Argentino A, he featured thirty times and scored two goals for the club as they won the title and promotion to 2006–07 Primera B Nacional. At the conclusion of 2005–06, Mancinelli was signed by fellow Primera B Nacional team Olimpo. Fifteen appearances later, Mancinelli were promoted to the Argentine Primera División after finishing top of the 2006–07 Primera B Nacional. In 2008, Mancinelli joined Mérida in Mexico's Primera División A.

For Mérida, Mancinelli made his debut on 4 October 2008 in a victory over Atlético Mexiquense. In the following April, he scored his first two goals for the club after netting twice against Querétaro in a 2–1 win. Four further goals followed in a total of sixty-seven matches over two years for Mérida. He left in 2010 but remained in Mexican football after signing for Atlante UTN. He went on to make seventeen appearances. He rejoined Olimpo in 2011 and subsequently made seventeen appearances in 2011–12. Huracán became Mancinelli's seventh senior club in July 2012 as he signed contract terms with the Primera B Nacional side.

In the following six seasons, Mancinelli played one hundred and thirty-two games for Huracán in Primera B Nacional and in the Argentine Primera División; following promotion in 2014. Shortly after, he was part of the Huracán squad which won the 2013–14 Copa Argentina and 2014 Supercopa Argentina. Huracán announced, in June 2019, that Mancinelli's contract wouldn't be renewed at the conclusion of 2018–19, bringing an end to his seven-year spell with the club. Mancinelli subsequently agreed a deal with Patronato. After nineteen matches for them, Mancinelli headed to Sarmiento in September 2020.

In January 2022, Mancinelli joined Primera Nacional club Guillermo Brown.

== Career statistics ==
As of 7 September 2020.

Club statistics
Club	Season	League			Cup		League Cup		Continental		Other		Total	
Club	Season	Division	Apps	Goals	Apps	Goals	Apps	Goals	Apps	Goals	Apps	Goals	Apps	Goals
Huracán	2012–13	Primera B Nacional	35	1	1	0	—		—		0	0	36	1
Huracán	2013–14	Primera B Nacional	27	0	0	0	—		—		1 (Note: Appearance(s) in the Primera B Nacional play-offs)	0	28	0
Huracán	2014	Primera B Nacional	18	0	4	1	—		—		1	1	23	2
Huracán	2015	Primera División	16	0	0	0	—		18 (Note: Appearance(s) in the Copa Libertadores and Copa Sudamericana)	2	1 (Note: Appearance(s) in the Supercopa Argentina play-offs)	0	35	2
Huracán	2016	Primera División	14	0	0	0	—		9 (Note: Appearance(s) in the Copa Libertadores)	0	0	0	23	0
Huracán	2016–17	Primera División	22	1	2	0	—		0	0	0	0	24	1
Huracán	2017–18	Primera División	2	0	0	0	—		0	0	0	0	2	0
Huracán	2018–19	Primera División	21	0	2	0	0	0	4	0	0	0	27	0
Huracán	Total		155	2	9	1	0	0	31	2	3	1	198	6
Patronato	2019–20	Primera División	18	0	1	0	0	0	—		0	0	19	0
Sarmiento	2020–21	Primera B Nacional	0	0	0	0	—		—		0	0	0	0
Career total			173	2	10	1	0	0	31	2	3	1	217	6

== Honours ==
Villa Mitre

- Torneo Argentino A: 2005–06

Olimpo

- Primera B Nacional: 2006–07

Mérida

- Primera División A: 2008–09 Clausura

Huracán

- Copa Argentina: 2013–14
- Supercopa Argentina: 2014
