= José Luis Fernández =

Argentine footballer

Personal information
- Full name: José Luis Fernández
- Date of birth: 26 October 1987 (age 39)
- Place of birth: Ciudadela, Argentina
- Height: 1.68 m (5 ft 6 in)
- Position: Left winger

Team information
- Current team: Atlético Tucumán

Youth career
- Racing Club

Senior career*
Years	Team	Apps	(Gls)
2008–2010	Racing Club	35	(3)
2011–2013	Benfica	2	(0)
2011–2012	→ Estudiantes (loan)	5	(0)
2012	→ Olhanense (loan)	1	(0)
2013	→ Godoy Cruz (loan)	18	(2)
2013−2015	Godoy Cruz	52	(6)
2015−2018	Rosario Central	57	(4)
2019	Defensa y Justicia	1	(0)
2019−2020	Atlético Tucumán	0	(0)
2020−2021	Central Córdoba	0	(0)
2021−	Nueva Chicago	0	(0)

International career
2010	Argentina	1	(0)
- * Club domestic league appearances and goals as of 16:14, 11 March 2019 (UTC)

José Luis Fernández (born 26 October 1987) is an Argentine footballer who plays as a midfielder for Nueva Chicago. He is a left-footed player who usually plays on the left wing.

== Club career ==
In July 2013, Fernández signed a permanent deal with Godoy Cruz, with Godoy buying half of his economic rights from S.L. Benfica.

On 9 January 2015, Rosario Central signed Fernández for 4 years.

== Career statistics ==
As of 11 March 2019

Appearances and goals by club, season and competition
Club	Season	League			Cup		League Cup		Other		Total	
Club	Season	Division	Apps	Goals	Apps	Goals	Apps	Goals	Apps	Goals	Apps	Goals
Racing Club	2008–09	Argentine Primera División	7	1	0	0	—				7	1
Racing Club	2009–10	Argentine Primera División	9	1	0	0	—				9	1
Racing Club	2010–11	Argentine Primera División	19	1	0	0	—				19	1
Racing Club	Total		35	3	0	0	0	0	0	0	35	3
Benfica	2010–11	Primeira Liga	2	0	0	0	1	0	—		3	0
Estudiantes LP (loan)	2011–12	Argentine Primera División	5	0	1	0	—				6	0
Olhanense (loan)	2012–13	Primeira Liga	1	0	1	0	1	0	—		3	0
Godoy Cruz (loan)	2012–13	Argentine Primera División	18	2	1	0	—				19	2
Godoy Cruz	2013–14	Argentine Primera División	37	5	1	1	—				38	6
Godoy Cruz	2014	Argentine Primera División	15	1	0	0	—		2 (Note: Appearance(s) in the Copa Sudamericana)	0	17	1
Godoy Cruz	Total		52	6	1	1	0	0	2	0	55	7
Rosario Central	2015	Argentine Primera División	20	2	5	0	–				25	2
Rosario Central	2016	Argentine Primera División	6	0	1	0	—		5 (Note: Appearance(s) in the Copa Libertadores)	0	12	0
Rosario Central	2016–17	Argentine Primera División	12	1	5	1	—		1 (Note: Appearance(s) in the Torneos de Verano)	0	18	2
Rosario Central	2017–18	Argentine Primera División	15	1	0	0	—		2 (Note: Appearance(s) in the Torneos de Verano & Copa Sudamericana)	0	17	1
Rosario Central	2018–19	Argentine Primera División	4	0	0	0	—				4	0
Rosario Central	Total		57	4	11	1	0	0	8	0	76	5
Defensa y Justicia	2018–19	Argentine Primera División	1	0	0	0	—				1	0
Career totals			171	15	15	2	2	0	10	0	198	17

== International career ==
Fernández was called up for the Argentina national team to play a game against Haiti. All the players in Diego Maradona's squad were from the Argentine Primera División. Fernández made his international debut in the 60th minute, substituting Ariel Ortega.

== Honours ==
Benfica

- Taça da Liga: 2010–11
