= Cristian Álvarez (footballer, born January 1978) =

Argentine footballer

Personal information
- Full name: Cristian Osvaldo Álvarez Reyes
- Date of birth: 9 January 1978 (age 48)
- Place of birth: Buenos Aires, Argentina
- Height: 1.83 m (6 ft 0 in)
- Positions: Right-back; midfielder

Youth career
- Lanús

Senior career*
| Years | Team | Apps | (Gls) |
| 1998–2002 | Lanús | 95 | (7) |
| 2002–2003 | Arsenal Sarandí | 37 | (3) |
| 2003 | Lanús | 12 | (4) |
| 2003–2007 | Racing Santander | 42 | (6) |
| 2005 | → Córdoba (loan) | 23 | (9) |
| 2005–2006 | → Tenerife (loan) | 40 | (11) |
| 2007–2009 | Córdoba | 65 | (7) |
| 2009–2011 | Arsenal Sarandí | 47 | (7) |
| 2011–2014 | San Martín San Juan | 81 | (5) |
| 2014–2016 | Argentinos Juniors | 29 | (2) |
| Total | | 471 | (61) |
- * Club domestic league appearances and goals as of 00:00, 5 October 2015 (UTC)

Cristian Osvaldo Álvarez Reyes (born 9 January 1978) is an Argentine former professional footballer who played mainly as a right-back.

He played six years of his career in Spain, amassing league totals of 170 matches and 33 goals in representation of three teams (42/6 in La Liga).

== Football career ==
Born in Buenos Aires, Álvarez began his career at Club Atlético Lanús in the Argentine Primera División in 1998. He also had a short spell with Arsenal de Sarandí before moving to Spain with Racing de Santander where he played three seasons with average impact, with a six-month loan stint with Segunda División side Córdoba CF in between.

After another loan in the Spanish second level, with CD Tenerife, Álvarez returned to Santander, appearing in 23 matches in 2006–07 as the Cantabria team finished tenth. In the following campaign he signed permanently with Córdoba for two years, with the Andalusians eventually barely maintaining their division two status.

In the 2009 off-season, after helping Córdoba finish mid-table, 31-year-old Álvarez returned to his country and a former club, signing with Arsenal Sarandí. Two years later, he joined San Martín de San Juan.
