= Carlos Arano =

Argentine footballer

Personal information
- Full name: Carlos Andrés Arano
- Date of birth: May 6, 1980 (age 46)
- Place of birth: Avellaneda, Argentina
- Height: 1.70 m (5 ft 7 in)
- Position: Left back

Team information
- Current team: Huracán

Senior career*
Years	Team	Apps	(Gls)
1999–2003	Racing	75	(2)
2003	Siena	2	(0)
2004	Perugia	0	(0)
2004–2005	Quilmes	19	(0)
2005	Estudiantes	11	(1)
2006	Racing	13	(2)
2006–2007	Poli Ejido	20	(1)
2008–2009	Huracán	55	(1)
2009–2010	Aris	35	(0)
2010–2013	River Plate	24	(0)
2013–	Huracán	54	(1)
- Las Pantus
- * Club domestic league appearances and goals as of 18 March 2015 (UTC)

Carlos Andrés Arano (born 6 May 1980 in Avellaneda, Buenos Aires Province), also known as Chiche Arano, is an Argentinian former professional footballer who played as a defender.
