= Hernán Encina =

Argentine footballer (born 1982)

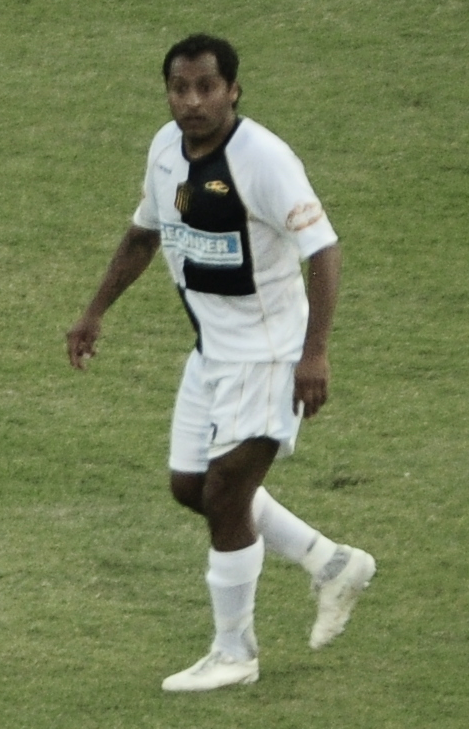
- March 18, 2013, Rosario Central 2-Olimpo 2;

Personal information
- Full name: Hernán Nicolás Encina
- Date of birth: 3 November 1982 (age 44)
- Place of birth: Rosario, Argentina
- Height: 1.62 m (5 ft 4 in)
- Position: Right winger

Team information
- Current team: Guaraní Antonio Franco

Senior career*
Years	Team	Apps	(Gls)
2001–2006	Rosario Central	51	(3)
2007	Tecos	19	(3)
2007	Atlas	12	(2)
2008	Colón de Santa Fe	11	(0)
2008–2009	Godoy Cruz	30	(1)
2009–2010	Barcelona SC	10	(0)
2010–2011	→ Gimnasia	51	(3)
2011–2012	Instituto	36	(4)
2012–2015	Rosario Central	71	(7)
2015–2016	Olimpo	27	(1)
2016	Talleres de Córdoba	7	(1)
2016–2017	Independiente Rivadavia	25	(1)
2017–	Guaraní Antonio Franco	7	(0)
- * Club domestic league appearances and goals as of 17 December 2017

Hernán Nicolás Encina (born 3 November 1982) is an Argentine football midfielder who plays for Guaraní Antonio Franco in the Primera B Nacional.

== Career ==
Born in Rosario, Encina made his league debut in 2001 for Rosario Central, he made over 50 appearances for the club before joining Mexican side Tecos in 2007, later that year he played for Atlas.

In 2008 Encina returned to Argentina where he played for Colón de Santa Fe and then Godoy Cruz.

On June 7, 2009, Encina will be joining Barcelona for the second part of the Ecuadorian Serie A. On 19 January 2010 Club de Gimnasia y Esgrima La Plata has obtained on loan for six months the 27-year-old attacking midfielder.
