= Paulo Ferrari =

Argentine footballer

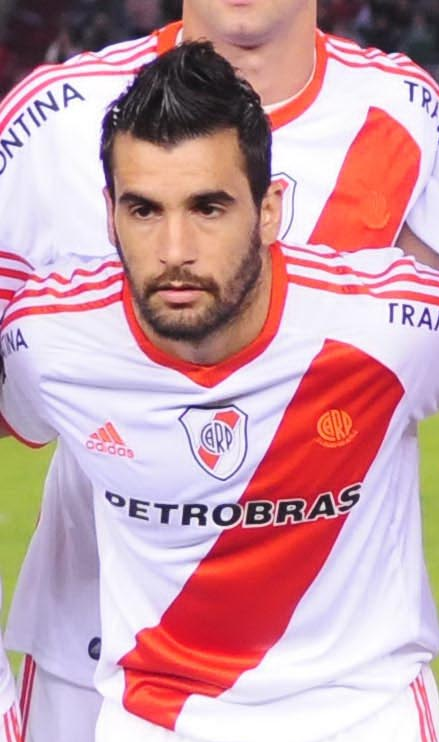

Personal information
- Full name: Paulo Andrés Ferrari
- Date of birth: 4 January 1982 (age 44)
- Place of birth: Rosario, Argentina
- Height: 1.69 m (5 ft 7 in)
- Position: Right-back

Team information
- Current team: San Martín SJ (manager)

Senior career*
Years	Team	Apps	(Gls)
1999–2006	Rosario Central	151	(12)
2006–2011	River Plate	228	(15)
2011–2018	Rosario Central	125	(5)

Managerial career
- 2019: Rosario Central
- 2020–2021: San Martín SJ
- * Club domestic league appearances and goals

Paulo Andrés Ferrari (born 4 January 1982) is an Argentine football manager and former player who played as a right-back. He is the current manager of San Martín de San Juan.

== Career ==
Ferrari grew as a product of Rosario Central, where he had his youth career. He later became a symbol and captain of Central before joining River Plate at the start of the 2006 Apertura tournament. In 2011, following his release from River Plate, Ferrari returned to Rosario Central.

== Honours ==
River Plate

- Argentine Primera División: 2008 Clausura

Rosario Central

- Primera B Nacional: 2012–13
