= 2019–20 Club Atlético Huracán season =

Huracán
2019–20 season
- President: Alejandro Nadur
- Manager: Juan Pablo Vojvoda
- Stadium: Estadio Tomás Adolfo Ducó
- Copa Argentina: Round of 32
- Top goalscorer: League: Fernando Coniglio (2); All: Fernando Coniglio (2)

The 2019–20 season is Huracán's 7th consecutive season in the top division of Argentine football. In addition to the Primera División, the club are competing in the Copa Argentina, Copa de la Superliga and Copa Sudamericana.

The season generally covers the period from 1 July 2019 to 30 June 2020.

== Review ==
=== Pre-season ===
On 8 June 2019, young forward Leandro Paradiso was released by Huracán; who claimed he had underperformed in their academy, this drew criticism from fans and the player himself. Omar Alderete was the club's first senior outgoing of the transfer market, with the centre-back completing a move to Swiss football with Basel on 11 June. Adrián Calello was their first reinforcement of 2019–20, as the defensive midfielder returned to the club after a one-season stint away with Banfield. Leonel Müller agreed his departure from Huracán on 20 June to Defensores de Belgrano, with Manuel Falón also leaving to go to Sacachispas. On 21 June, defensive duo Christian Chimino and Federico Mancinelli made it four departing players after penning terms with domestic rivals Patronato.

Israel Damonte was signed by fellow top-flight team Banfield on 24 June. Huracán played their first pre-season fixtures on 26 June, subsequently experiencing a three-goal victory and a one-goal defeat at the Estadio Tomás Adolfo Ducó to Argentinos Juniors. Forward Tomás Molina was allowed to leave hours later, signing a deal with Brown. Globo penned a contract with Gonzalo Bettini from Rosario Central on 27 June. Numerous loans from the previous campaign officially expired on 30 June. Rodrigo Gómez was loaned in from Liga MX's Toluca on 1 July. Juan Pablo Vojvoda's team made a further transaction on 2 July, as the club secured terms with Gimnasia y Esgrima's Lorenzo Faravelli. Huracán failed to beat Defensa y Justicia in two friendlies on 3 July.

Fernando Pellegrino, who had left on 30 June following the expiration of his temporary contract, rejoined Huracán on a fresh season-long loan deal on 5 July. On the same day, Racing Club duo Mariano Bareiro and Martín Ojeda also came in on loan. A win and a draw arrived in friendlies with Ferro Carril Oeste on 6 July. Bareiro scored on his non-competitive debut on 10 July, gaining his new side a victory in a friendly with Atlanta; in an encounter which followed a goalless draw between the two.

=== July ===
Huracán met Godoy Cruz in the Copa Argentina round of thirty-two on 14 July at the Estadio Presidente Perón, they'd subsequently exit the competition on penalties following a 1–1 draw; as they missed four of their five spot-kicks. Right-back Pablo Álvarez was allowed to train with Arsenal de Sarandí on 19 July, ahead of a potential move. During the succeeding twenty-four hours, the club played Vélez Sarsfield in pre-season friendlies; ending the day with a win apiece. Pablo Álvarez headed off to Arsenal de Sarandí on 22 July. Fernando Cosciuc departed on loan to Brown on 23 July. Huracán held Boca Juniors to a goalless draw at La Bombonera on 29 July, in their first fixture of the 2019–20 campaign.

=== August ===
Lucas Gamba was transferred to Rosario Central on 1 August, as the centre-forward penned for three years. Juan Ignacio Vieyra and Joaquín Arzura (loan) became reinforcements for Huracán on 1 August, as they came from Nacional and River Plate respectively. Huracán met Colón in match two in the Primera División on 2 August, defeating the Santa Fe outfit two-nil. A Lucas Barrios penalty gave Huracán victory in a friendly over Defensores de Belgrano on 10 August. Alex Sosa departed Huracán on 14 August, joining Brown. On 15 August, Patricio Toranzo joined Almagro while Federico Marín (loan) and Juan Ignacio Sills went to Defensores de Belgrano and Instituto. In their second league fixture away from home, Huracán lost 2–1 to Patronato.

Huracán's second scoreless tie in the Primera División came on 26 August, as they shared the points with Argentinos Juniors. 30 August saw Diego Mendoza leave on loan, signing with Ibiza of Spain's 2019–20 Segunda División B.

=== September ===
Huracán lost their second successive away game on 1 September to Newell's Old Boys, who put four past them at the Estadio Marcelo Bielsa.

== Squad ==
Squad No.	Nationality	Name	Position(s)	Date of Birth (age)	Signed from
Goalkeepers
1	Paraguay	Antony Silva	GK	27 February 1984 (age 42)	Cerro Porteño
22	Argentina	Fernando Pellegrino	GK	31 March 1986 (age 40)	Defensa y Justicia (loan)
	Argentina	Rafael Ferrario	GK	30 April 2000 (age 26)	Academy
	Argentina	Joaquín Mendive	GK	8 August 1996 (age 30)	Academy
Defenders
2	Argentina	Gonzalo Bettini	LB	7 September 1992 (age 34)	Rosario Central
4	Argentina	Carlos Araujo	RB	19 November 1981 (age 44)	Lanús
6	Paraguay	Saúl Salcedo	CB	29 August 1997 (age 29)	Olimpia
13	Argentina	Walter Pérez	LB	23 October 1998 (age 28)	Academy
23	Argentina	Lucas Merolla	CB	27 June 1995 (age 31)	Academy
	Argentina	César Ibáñez	DF	19 August 1999 (age 27)	Academy
	Argentina	Nicolás Romat	RB	6 May 1988 (age 38)	Atlético Tucumán
	Argentina	Claudio Vargas	CB	8 August 1996 (age 30)	Academy
Midfielders
5	Argentina	Adrián Calello	DM	14 May 1987 (age 39)	Banfield
7	Argentina	Juan Garro	LW	24 November 1992 (age 33)	Godoy Cruz
10	Argentina	Martín Ojeda	LW	27 November 1998 (age 27)	Racing Club (loan)
15	Argentina	Rodrigo Gómez	RM	2 January 1993 (age 33)	Toluca (loan)
16	Argentina	Lorenzo Faravelli	AM	29 March 1993 (age 33)	Gimnasia y Esgrima
17	Argentina	Mariano Bareiro	DM	8 March 1995 (age 31)	Racing Club (loan)
18	Argentina	Mauro Bogado	RM	31 May 1985 (age 41)	San Martín
27	Argentina	Agustín Casco	RM	28 January 1997 (age 29)	Academy
29	Argentina	Juan Ignacio Vieyra	CM	20 April 1992 (age 34)	Nacional
30	Argentina	Javier Mendoza	LW	2 September 1992 (age 34)	Instituto
	Argentina	Joaquín Arzura	CM	18 May 1993 (age 33)	River Plate (loan)
	Argentina	Pablo Barboza	MF	25 April 1996 (age 30)	Academy
	Argentina	Leandro Cuomo	MF	16 January 1996 (age 30)	Academy
	Colombia	Daniel Hernández	AM	10 December 1990 (age 35)	San Lorenzo
	Argentina	Matías Juárez	CM	3 January 1997 (age 29)	Academy
	Argentina	Leandro Romano	MF	8 June 1997 (age 29)	Academy
Forwards
8	Paraguay	Lucas Barrios	CF	13 November 1984 (age 42)	Colo-Colo
9	Argentina	Andrés Chávez	CF	21 March 1991 (age 35)	Panathinaikos
19	Argentina	Nicolás Cordero	CF	11 April 1999 (age 27)	Academy
20	Armenia	Norberto Briasco-Balekian	CF	29 February 1996 (age 30)	Academy
24	Argentina	Fernando Coniglio	CF	24 November 1991 (age 34)	Olimpo
28	Argentina	Rodrigo Cabral	CF	8 August 2000 (age 26)	Academy
	Argentina	Agustín Curruhinca	FW	6 January 2000 (age 26)	Academy
	Argentina	Germán Lesman	CF	8 September 1990 (age 36)	Instituto
Out on loan					Loaned to
12	Argentina	Fernando Cosciuc	DF	19 February 1998 (age 28)	Brown
14	Argentina	Federico Marín	CM	24 March 1998 (age 28)	Defensores de Belgrano
	Argentina	Diego Mendoza	CF	30 September 1992 (age 34)	Ibiza

== Transfers ==
Domestic transfer windows:
3 July 2019 to 24 September 2019
20 January 2020 to 19 February 2020.

=== Transfers in ===
Date from	Position	Nationality	Name	From	Ref.
3 July 2019 (Note: Deal agreed on 19 June 2019)	DM	Argentina	Adrián Calello	Banfield	
3 July 2019 (Note: Deal agreed on 27 June 2019)	LB	Argentina	Gonzalo Bettini	Rosario Central	
3 July 2019 (Note: Deal agreed on 2 July 2019)	AM	Argentina	Lorenzo Faravelli	Gimnasia y Esgrima	
1 August 2019	CM	Argentina	Juan Ignacio Vieyra	Nacional	

=== Transfers out ===
Date from	Position	Nationality	Name	To	Ref.
8 June 2019	CB	Argentina	Leandro Paradiso	Released	
11 June 2019 (Note: Deal agreed on 4 June 2019)	CB	Argentina	Omar Alderete	Basel	
3 July 2019 (Note: Deal agreed on 20 June 2019)	MF	Argentina	Manuel Falón	Sacachispas	
3 July 2019 (Note: Deal agreed on 20 June 2019)	DF	Argentina	Leonel Müller	Defensores de Belgrano	
3 July 2019 (Note: Deal agreed on 21 June 2019)	RB	Argentina	Christian Chimino	Patronato	
3 July 2019 (Note: Deal agreed on 21 June 2019)	CB	Argentina	Federico Mancinelli	Patronato	
3 July 2019 (Note: Deal agreed on 24 June 2019)	CM	Argentina	Israel Damonte	Banfield	
3 July 2019 (Note: Deal agreed on 26 June 2019)	CF	Argentina	Tomás Molina	Brown	
22 July 2019	RB	Argentina	Pablo Álvarez	Arsenal de Sarandí	
1 August 2019	CF	Argentina	Lucas Gamba	Rosario Central	
12 August 2019	CB	Argentina	Juan Ignacio Sills	Instituto	
14 August 2019	RM	Argentina	Alex Sosa	Brown	
15 August 2019	RM	Argentina	Patricio Toranzo	Almagro	

=== Loans in ===
Start date	Position	Nationality	Name	From	End date	Ref.
3 July 2019 (Note: Deal agreed on 1 July 2019)	RM	Argentina	Rodrigo Gómez	Toluca	30 June 2020	
5 July 2019	DM	Argentina	Mariano Bareiro	Racing Club	30 June 2020	
5 July 2019	GK	Argentina	Fernando Pellegrino	Defensa y Justicia	30 June 2020	
5 July 2019	LW	Argentina	Martín Ojeda	Racing Club	30 June 2020	
1 August 2019	CM	Argentina	Joaquín Arzura	River Plate	30 June 2020	

=== Loans out ===
Start date	Position	Nationality	Name	To	End date	Ref.
23 July 2019	DF	Argentina	Fernando Cosciuc	Brown	30 June 2020	
15 August 2019	CM	Argentina	Federico Marín	Defensores de Belgrano	30 June 2020	
30 August 2019	CF	Argentina	Diego Mendoza	Ibiza	30 June 2020	

== Friendlies ==
=== Pre-season ===
Ferro Carril Oeste announced a friendly with Huracán on 17 June 2019, with the encounter to be played at the Estadio Tomás Adolfo Ducó on 6 July. They themselves revealed a pre-season fixture on 21 July, as Argentinos Juniors were set to visit their stadium for a double-header on 26 June. Atlanta of Primera B Nacional penciled in a friendly with Huracán on 24 June for 10 July. Games with Defensa y Justicia was scheduled for 3 July on 27 June.

Win Draw Loss

26 June 2019 Friendly	Huracán	3–0	Argentinos Juniors	Buenos Aires, Argentina
	M. Bogado; J. Mendoza; L. Merolla	Huracán; TyC Sports		Stadium: Estadio Tomás Adolfo Ducó; Attendance: 0 (Note: Behind closed doors.)

26 June 2019 Friendly	Huracán	0–1	Argentinos Juniors	Buenos Aires, Argentina
		Huracán; IAM Noticias	I. Colman	Stadium: Estadio Tomás Adolfo Ducó; Attendance: 0 (Note: Behind closed doors.)

3 July 2019 Friendly	Defensa y Justicia	1–1	Huracán	Florencio Varela, Argentina
	N. Fernández	Huracán; Grupo La Provincia	A. Chávez	Stadium: Estadio Norberto "Tito" Tomaghello

3 July 2019 Friendly	Defensa y Justicia	1–0	Huracán	Florencio Varela, Argentina
	N. González	Huracán; Grupo La Provincia		Stadium: Estadio Norberto "Tito" Tomaghello

6 July 2019 Friendly	Huracán	1–0	Ferro Carril Oeste	Buenos Aires, Argentina
	A. Chávez	Huracán; Olé; 70 min. match		Stadium: Estadio Tomás Adolfo Ducó

6 July 2019 Friendly	Huracán	1–1	Ferro Carril Oeste	Buenos Aires, Argentina
	J. Mendoza	Huracán; Olé; 70 min. match	N. Maidana (pen.)	Stadium: Estadio Tomás Adolfo Ducó

10 July 2019 Friendly	Huracán	0–0	Atlanta	Buenos Aires, Argentina
10:00 GMT-3		Huracán; TyC Sports; 40 min. match		Stadium: Campo de Deportes Jorge Newbery; Attendance: 0 (Note: Behind closed doors.)

10 July 2019 Friendly	Huracán	1–0	Atlanta	Buenos Aires, Argentina
	M. Bareiro	Huracán; TyC Sports; 50 min. match		Stadium: Campo de Deportes Jorge Newbery; Attendance: 0 (Note: Behind closed doors.)

=== Mid-season ===
A match with Platense was initially scheduled before being cancelled. They'd also meet Vélez Sarsfield on 20 July and Defensores de Belgrano on 10 August.

Win Draw Loss

17 July 2019 Friendly	Huracán	Cancelled	Platense	Buenos Aires, Argentina
				Stadium: Estadio Tomás Adolfo Ducó

20 July 2019 Friendly	Vélez Sarsfield	2–0	Huracán	Ituzaingó, Argentina
	A. Bouzat; T. Guidara	Huracán; ESPN; 70 min. match		Stadium: Villa Olímpica

20 July 2019 Friendly	Vélez Sarsfield	0–1	Huracán	Ituzaingó, Argentina
		Huracán; ESPN; 70 min. match	J. Garro	Stadium: Villa Olímpica

10 August 2019 Friendly	Huracán	1–0	Defensores de Belgrano	Buenos Aires, Argentina
	L. Barrios (pen.)	Huracán; Grupo La Provincia		Stadium: Campo de Deportes Jorge Newbery

== Competitions ==
=== Primera División ===
==== League table ====
Pos	Team	Pld	W	D	L	GF	GA	GD	Pts
19	Gimnasia y Esgrima (LP)	23	6	5	12	22	23	−1	23
20	Patronato	23	5	8	10	22	34	−12	23
21	Huracán	23	5	7	11	17	27	−10	22
22	Aldosivi	23	6	4	13	20	35	−15	22
23	Colón	23	5	3	15	17	39	−22	18

Source: AFA
Rules for classification: 1) points; 2) play-off (only if needed to decide championship); 3) goal difference; 4) goals scored; 5) head-to-head points; 6) head-to-head goal difference; 7) head-to-head goals scored.

==== Relegation table ====
Pos	Team	2017–18 Pts	2018–19 Pts	2019–20 Pts	Total Pts	Total Pld	Avg	Relegation
7	Godoy Cruz	56	32	3	91	57	1.596	
8	Talleres (C)	46	33	10	89	57	1.561	
9	Huracán	48	35	5	88	57	1.544	
10	San Lorenzo	50	23	13	86	57	1.509	
11	Vélez Sarsfield	38	40	7	85	57	1.491	

Source: AFA

==== Results summary ====
Overall								Home						Away					
Pld	W	D	L	GF	GA	GD	Pts	W	D	L	GF	GA	GD	W	D	L	GF	GA	GD
5	1	2	2	4	6	−2	5	1	1	0	2	0	+2	0	1	2	2	6	−4

Last updated: 2 September 2019.
Source: Soccerway

==== Matches ====
The fixtures for the 2019–20 campaign were released on 10 July.

Win Draw Loss

28 July 2019 1	Boca Juniors	0–0	Huracán	Buenos Aires, Argentina
20:00 GMT-3		Huracán; Infobae; Soccerway		Stadium: La Bombonera; Referee: Diego Abal (Argentina)

2 August 2019 2	Huracán	2–0	Colón	Buenos Aires, Argentina
21:00 GMT-3	R. Gómez 61' (pen.); F. Coniglio 90+2'	Huracán; Infobae; Soccerway		Stadium: Estadio Tomás Adolfo Ducó; Referee: Hernán Mastrángelo (Argentina)

18 August 2019 3	Patronato	2–1	Huracán	Paraná, Argentina
11:00 GMT-3	G. Ávalos 2'; H. Silveira 59'	Huracán; Infobae; Soccerway	N. Briasco-Balekian 76'	Stadium: Estadio Presbítero Bartolomé Grella; Referee: Germán Delfino (Argentina)

26 August 2019 4	Huracán	0–0	Argentinos Juniors	Buenos Aires, Argentina
21:10 GMT-3		Huracán; Infobae; Soccerway		Stadium: Estadio Tomás Adolfo Ducó; Referee: Patricio Loustau (Argentina)

1 September 2019 5	Newell's Old Boys	4–1	Huracán	Rosario, Argentina
13:15 GMT-3	M. Formica 6'; C. Lema 33', 90+5' (pen.); Á. Gabrielli 68'	Huracán; Infobae; Soccerway	F. Coniglio 38'	Stadium: Estadio Marcelo Bielsa; Referee: Néstor Pitana (Argentina)

6	Huracán	–	River Plate	Buenos Aires, Argentina
				Stadium: Estadio Tomás Adolfo Ducó

=== Copa Argentina ===
Huracán were drawn with fellow Primera División team Godoy Cruz in the Copa Argentina round of thirty-two, with the fixture set to take place on 14 July 2019 in Córdoba at the Estadio Presidente Perón; a neutral venue, as is customary in the competition.

Win Draw Loss

14 July 2019 R32	Huracán	1–1 (1–2 p)	Godoy Cruz	Córdoba, Argentina
20:40 GMT-3	S. Salcedo 45+2'	Huracán; Infobae; Soccerway	J. Varela 28'	Stadium: Estadio Presidente Perón; Referee: Darío Herrera (Argentina)
	Penalties
	L. Gamba (penalty missed); A. Chávez (penalty missed); R. Gómez (penalty scored); S. Salcedo (penalty missed); L. Faravelli (penalty missed)		S. García (penalty scored); J. Brunetta (penalty missed); T. Cardona (penalty scored); J. Varela (penalty missed)

=== Copa de la Superliga ===
Win Draw Loss

	–
00:00 GMT-3

=== Copa Sudamericana ===
Win Draw Loss

	–
00:00 GMT-3

== Squad statistics ==
=== Appearances and goals ===
No.	Pos.	Nationality	Name	League		Cup		League Cup		Continental		Total		Discipline		Ref
No.	Pos.	Nationality	Name	Apps	Goals	Apps	Goals	Apps	Goals	Apps	Goals	Apps	Goals	Yellow card	Red card	Ref
1	GK	Paraguay	Antony Silva	5	0	1	0	0	0	0	0	6	0	0	0	
2	LB	Argentina	Gonzalo Bettini	5	0	1	0	0	0	0	0	6	0	0	0	
4	RB	Argentina	Carlos Araujo	0(1)	0	0	0	0	0	0	0	0(1)	0	0	0	
5	DM	Argentina	Adrián Calello	5	0	1	0	0	0	0	0	6	0	4	0	
6	CB	Paraguay	Saúl Salcedo	5	0	1	1	0	0	0	0	6	1	2	0	
7	LW	Argentina	Juan Garro	4(1)	0	0	0	0	0	0	0	4(1)	0	0	0	
8	CF	Paraguay	Lucas Barrios	0(1)	0	0	0	0	0	0	0	0(1)	0	0	0	
9	CF	Argentina	Andrés Chávez	5	0	1	0	0	0	0	0	6	0	1	0	
10	LW	Argentina	Martín Ojeda	0(1)	0	0	0	0	0	0	0	0(1)	0	0	0	
12	DF	Argentina	Fernando Cosciuc	0	0	0	0	0	0	0	0	0	0	0	0	
13	LB	Argentina	Walter Pérez	5	0	1	0	0	0	0	0	6	0	1	0	
14	CM	Argentina	Federico Marín	0(1)	0	0	0	0	0	0	0	0(1)	0	0	0	
15	RM	Argentina	Rodrigo Gómez	5	1	1	0	0	0	0	0	6	1	1	0	
16	AM	Argentina	Lorenzo Faravelli	4(1)	0	1	0	0	0	0	0	5(1)	0	1	0	
17	DM	Argentina	Mariano Bareiro	5	0	0	0	0	0	0	0	5	0	0	0	
18	RM	Argentina	Mauro Bogado	2(1)	0	0	0	0	0	0	0	2(1)	0	4	1	
19	CF	Argentina	Nicolás Cordero	0	0	0	0	0	0	0	0	0	0	0	0	
20	CF	Armenia	Norberto Briasco-Balekian	3(2)	1	1	0	0	0	0	0	4(2)	1	0	0	
22	GK	Argentina	Fernando Pellegrino	0	0	0	0	0	0	0	0	0	0	0	0	
23	CB	Argentina	Lucas Merolla	0	0	1	0	0	0	0	0	1	0	0	0	
24	CF	Argentina	Fernando Coniglio	1(3)	2	0	0	0	0	0	0	1(3)	2	0	0	
27	RM	Argentina	Agustín Casco	0	0	0	0	0	0	0	0	0	0	0	0	
28	CF	Argentina	Rodrigo Cabral	0	0	0	0	0	0	0	0	0	0	0	0	
29	CM	Argentina	Juan Ignacio Vieyra	0(2)	0	0	0	0	0	0	0	0(2)	0	1	0	
30	LW	Argentina	Javier Mendoza	1(1)	0	0(1)	0	0	0	0	0	1(2)	0	0	0	
–	CM	Argentina	Joaquín Arzura	0	0	0	0	0	0	0	0	0	0	0	0	
–	MF	Argentina	Pablo Barboza	0	0	0	0	0	0	0	0	0	0	0	0	
–	MF	Argentina	Leandro Cuomo	0	0	0	0	0	0	0	0	0	0	0	0	
–	FW	Argentina	Agustín Curruhinca	0	0	0	0	0	0	0	0	0	0	0	0	
–	GK	Argentina	Rafael Ferrario	0	0	0	0	0	0	0	0	0	0	0	0	
–	AM	Colombia	Daniel Hernández	0	0	0	0	0	0	0	0	0	0	0	0	
–	DF	Argentina	César Ibáñez	0	0	0	0	0	0	0	0	0	0	0	0	
–	CM	Argentina	Matías Juárez	0	0	0	0	0	0	0	0	0	0	0	0	
–	CF	Argentina	Germán Lesman	0	0	0	0	0	0	0	0	0	0	0	0	
–	GK	Argentina	Joaquín Mendive	0	0	0	0	0	0	0	0	0	0	0	0	
–	CF	Argentina	Diego Mendoza	0	0	0	0	0	0	0	0	0	0	0	0	
–	MF	Argentina	Leandro Romano	0	0	0	0	0	0	0	0	0	0	0	0	
–	RB	Argentina	Nicolás Romat	0	0	0	0	0	0	0	0	0	0	0	0	
–	CB	Argentina	Claudio Vargas	0	0	0	0	0	0	0	0	0	0	0	0	
Own goals				—	0	—	0	—	0	—	0	—	0	—	—	—
Players who left during the season
18	RM	Argentina	Patricio Toranzo	0	0	0	0	0	0	0	0	0	0	0	0	
21	CF	Argentina	Lucas Gamba	0	0	1	0	0	0	0	0	1	0	0	0	
32	CB	Argentina	Juan Ignacio Sills	0	0	0	0	0	0	0	0	0	0	0	0	
–	RM	Argentina	Alex Sosa	0	0	1	0	0	0	0	0	1	0	0	0	

Statistics accurate as of 2 September 2019.

=== Goalscorers ===
Rank	Pos	No.	Nat	Name	League	Cup	League Cup	Continental	Total	Ref
1	CF	24	Argentina	Fernando Coniglio	2	0	0	0	2	
2	CB	6	Paraguay	Saúl Salcedo	0	1	0	0	1	
2	RM	15	Argentina	Rodrigo Gómez	1	0	0	0	1	
2	CF	20	Armenia	Norberto Briasco-Balekian	1	0	0	0	1	
Own goals					0	0	0	0	0	
Totals					4	1	0	0	5	—
