= Casco =

Casco may refer to:

== Places in the United States ==
- Casco, Maine, a town
  - Casco (CDP), Maine, a census-designated place within the town
- Casco Bay, a bay on the coast of Maine
- Casco, Missouri, a ghost town
- Casco, Wisconsin, a village
- Casco (town), Wisconsin, a town
- Casco Township, Allegan County, Michigan
- Casco Township, St. Clair County, Michigan
- Casco Peak, Colorado
- Fort Casco, an English fort built in present-day Falmouth, Maine, in 1698

== Ships ==
- USS Casco, several United States Navy ships
- Casco-class monitor, a class of United States Navy monitors built during the American Civil War
- Casco-class cutter, an 18-ship class of United States Coast Guard cutters in service between 1946 and 1988
- USCGC Casco (WAVP-370), later WHEC-370, a United States Coast Guard cutter in commission from 1949 to 1969
- Casco (barge), flat-bottomed square-ended barges from the Philippines, prevalent in the 18th and 19th centuries in Luzon

== Other uses ==
- Casco (surname), a list of people
- Casco (Utrecht), a Dutch non-profit art institution
- Casco (company), a Swedish chemicals manufacturer, now a part of AkzoNobel
- Connecticut Automotive Specialty Company (Casco), which patented its version of an automobile auxiliary power outlet
- CASCO (Central American and Caribbean Sports Organization), former name of Centro Caribe Sports
- ISO/CASCO, Committee on conformity assessment, International Organization for Standardization technical committee
