= Claudio Vargas (footballer, born 1996) =

Argentine professional footballer

Personal information
- Full name: Claudio Jonatan Vargas
- Date of birth: 8 August 1996 (age 30)
- Place of birth: Argentina
- Height: 1.77 m (5 ft 10 in)
- Position: Centre-back

Youth career
- Huracán

Senior career*
Years	Team	Apps	(Gls)
2017–2019	Huracán	0	(0)
2018–2019	→ Sacachispas (loan)	19	(0)
- * Club domestic league appearances and goals

Claudio Jonatan Vargas (born 8 August 1996) is an Argentine former professional footballer who played as a centre-back.

== Career ==
Vargas' career started with Huracán. He was an unused substitute at senior level in May 2017 for a Copa Sudamericana fixture with Deportivo Anzoátegui, though wasn't subbed on by manager Juan Manuel Azconzábal in a 4–0 victory. On 30 June 2018, Vargas agreed a loan move to Primera B Metropolitana's Sacachispas. He made his first senior appearances in the succeeding August, appearing in fixtures with San Miguel and Almirante Brown. He featured a total of fifteen times for them, twelve of which were as a starter.

== Career statistics ==
As of 17 June 2019.

Appearances and goals by club, season and competition
Club	Season	League			Cup		League Cup		Continental		Other		Total	
Club	Season	Division	Apps	Goals	Apps	Goals	Apps	Goals	Apps	Goals	Apps	Goals	Apps	Goals
Huracán	2016–17	Primera División	0	0	0	0	—		0	0	0	0	0	0
Huracán	2017–18	Primera División	0	0	0	0	—		0	0	0	0	0	0
Huracán	2018–19	Primera División	0	0	0	0	0	0	0	0	0	0	0	0
Huracán	2019–20	Primera División	0	0	0	0	0	0	0	0	0	0	0	0
Huracán	Total		0	0	0	0	0	0	0	0	0	0	0	0
Sacachispas (loan)	2018–19	Primera B Metropolitana	15	0	0	0	—		—		0	0	15	0
Career total			15	0	0	0	0	0	0	0	0	0	15	0
