= Walter Pérez =

Walter Pérez may refer to:

- Walter Perez (actor) (born 1982), American film, television actor and musician
- Walter Pérez (athlete) (1924-2009), Uruguay Olympic sprinter
- Walter Pérez (cyclist) (born 1975), Argentine racing cyclist
- Walter Pérez (footballer) (born 1998), Argentine defender for Club Atlético Huracán
- Walter Perez (reporter), Puerto Rican-American weekend morning co-anchor, journalist and reporter for WPVI, Philadelphia, Pennsylvania
