= Leandro Cuomo =

Argentine professional footballer

Personal information
- Full name: Leandro Emanuel Cuomo
- Date of birth: 16 January 1996 (age 30)
- Place of birth: Villa Ballester, Argentina
- Height: 1.77 m (5 ft 9 1/2 in)
- Position: Midfielder

Team information
- Current team: futbol club bunge
- Number: 11

Youth career
- Huracán

Senior career*
Years	Team	Apps	(Gls)
2017–2019	Huracán	0	(0)
2018–2019	→ Sacachispas (loan)	25	(0)
2020–	Rivadavia	5	(0)
- * Club domestic league appearances and goals as of 11:21, 26 September 2020 (UTC)

Leandro Emanuel Cuomo (born 16 January 1996) is an Argentine professional footballer who plays as a midfielder for Rivadavia.

== Career ==
Cuomo's career started with Huracán. Juan Manuel Azconzábal moved him into their first-team in 2017, a year in which Cuomo was selected in a squad for Copa Sudamericana encounters with Venezuela's Deportivo Anzoátegui. He was an unused sub in the first leg on 1 March, which ended in a 3–0 defeat. Cuomo was selected to start the second leg in May, with the midfielder featuring for eighty-eight minutes whilst also scoring his first career goal as Huracán put four unanswered goals past Deportivo Anzoátegui to progress. June 2018 saw Cuomo agree to join Primera B Metropolitana team Sacachispas on loan.

Having appeared twenty-five times for Sacachispas, Cuomo returned to Huracán before eventually departing. A move to Rivadavia of Torneo Regional Federal Amateur soon followed in early 2020.

== Career statistics ==
As of 26 September 2020.

Club statistics
Club	Season	League			Cup		League Cup		Continental		Other		Total	
Club	Season	Division	Apps	Goals	Apps	Goals	Apps	Goals	Apps	Goals	Apps	Goals	Apps	Goals
Huracán	2016–17	Primera División	0	0	0	0	—		1 (Note: Appearance(s) in the Copa Sudamericana)	1	0	0	1	1
Huracán	2017–18	Primera División	0	0	0	0	—		1	0	0	0	1	0
Huracán	2018–19	Primera División	0	0	0	0	0	0	0	0	0	0	0	0
Huracán	Total		0	0	0	0	0	0	2	1	0	0	2	1
Sacachispas (loan)	2018–19	Primera B Metropolitana	25	0	0	0	—		—		0	0	25	0
Rivadavia	2020	Torneo Amateur	5	0	0	0	—		—		0	0	5	0
Career total			30	0	0	0	0	0	2	1	0	0	32	1
