= Rodrigo Cabral =

Argentine professional footballer

Personal information
- Date of birth: 8 August 2000 (age 26)
- Place of birth: Mercedes, Argentina
- Height: 1.70 m (5 ft 7 in)
- Position: Left winger

Team information
- Current team: Audax Italiano (on loan from Huracán)
- Number: 10

Youth career
- Paso de Los Andes
- San Lorenzo Mercedes
- 2016–2019: Huracán

Senior career*
Years	Team	Apps	(Gls)
2019–	Huracán	108	(5)
2023	→ Argentinos Juniors (loan)	23	(1)
2026–	→ Audax Italiano (loan)	1	(0)
- * Club domestic league appearances and goals as of 31 January 2026

Rodrigo Cabral (born 8 August 2000) is an Argentine professional footballer who plays as a left winger for Chilean club Audax Italiano on loan from Huracán.

== Career ==
Cabral joined the youth academy of Huracán in 2016, having previously appeared for local teams Paso de Los Andes and San Lorenzo Mercedes. His progression into the Primera División club's first-team squad arrived in September 2019, with the centre-forward appearing on the substitutes bench for a victory away to Defensa y Justicia. Cabral made his professional debut a week later on 29 September versus Atlético Tucumán, as he replaced Juan Garro in the second half of a goalless draw at the Estadio Tomás Adolfo Ducó. Huracán sent Cabral on loan with an option to purchase to Argentinos Juniors for the 2023 season. After returning to Huracán, Cabral extended his contract during the 2024 season through the end of 2025. In June 2025, Cabral again extended his contract with Huracán through the end of 2027.

In January 2026, Cabral moved abroad and joined Chilean club Audax Italiano on a one-year loan.

== Career statistics ==
As of 29 September 2019.

Appearances and goals by club, season and competition
Club	Season	League			Cup		League Cup		Continental		Other		Total	
Club	Season	Division	Apps	Goals	Apps	Goals	Apps	Goals	Apps	Goals	Apps	Goals	Apps	Goals
Huracán	2019–20	Primera División	1	0	0	0	0	0	0	0	0	0	1	0
Career total			1	0	0	0	0	0	0	0	0	0	1	0
