= Leandro Romano =

Argentine professional footballer

Personal information
- Full name: Leandro Roberto Romano
- Date of birth: 8 April 1997 (age 29)
- Place of birth: Buenos Aires, Argentina
- Height: 1.76 m (5 ft 9 in)
- Position: Midfielder

Youth career
- Nueva Chicago San Justo
- 2008–2018: Huracán

Senior career*
Years	Team	Apps	(Gls)
2018–2020	Huracán	0	(0)
2018–2019	→ Sacachispas (loan)	8	(0)
- * Club domestic league appearances and goals

Leandro Roberto Romano (born 8 June 1997) is an Argentine professional footballer who plays as a midfielder.

== Career ==
Romano started his career in the ranks of Nueva Chicago San Justo, before signing for Huracán in 2008. June 2018 saw the midfielder depart on loan, as he joined Sacachispas of Primera B Metropolitana. After substitute appearances against Almirante Brown and Defensores Unidos, Romano made his first start in senior football in a 2–0 victory over Colegiales on 2 October 2018. He featured seven further times for Sacachispas, prior to returning to Huracán in June 2019. Romano remained at the club for a further twelve months, but would only feature at reserve level before his eventual release in June 2020.

== Career statistics ==
As of 27 September 2020.

Appearances and goals by club, season and competition
Club	Season	League			Cup		League Cup		Continental		Other		Total	
Club	Season	Division	Apps	Goals	Apps	Goals	Apps	Goals	Apps	Goals	Apps	Goals	Apps	Goals
Huracán	2018–19	Primera División	0	0	0	0	0	0	0	0	0	0	0	0
Huracán	2019–20	Primera División	0	0	0	0	0	0	0	0	0	0	0	0
Huracán	Total		0	0	0	0	0	0	0	0	0	0	0	0
Sacachispas (loan)	2018–19	Primera B Metropolitana	8	0	0	0	—		—		0	0	8	0
Career total			8	0	0	0	0	0	0	0	0	0	8	0
