= Matías Forlano =

Argentine professional footballer

Personal information
- Full name: Matías Nicolás Forlano
- Date of birth: 12 November 2001 (age 25)
- Place of birth: Buenos Aires, Argentina
- Height: 1.75 m (5 ft 9 in)
- Position: Midfielder

Team information
- Current team: Sacachispas

Youth career
- Racing Club
- 2015–2020: Huracán

Senior career*
Years	Team	Apps	(Gls)
2020–2022	Huracán	2	(0)
2023–	Sacachispas	8	(0)
- * Club domestic league appearances and goals as of 18 July 2023

Matías Nicolás Forlano (born 12 November 2001) is an Argentine professional footballer who plays as a midfielder for Sacachispas.

== Career ==
Forlano joined Huracán from Racing Club in 2015. Five years later, in 2020, Forlano was promoted into Huracán's first-team squad under manager Sebastián Beccacece. He was selected on the substitute's bench for a Copa de la Liga Profesional match away to Boca Juniors on 27 December, with the midfielder subsequently making his senior debut after replacing Santiago Hezze with fourteen minutes remaining of a 3–0 loss.

== Career statistics ==
As of 28 December 2020.

Appearances and goals by club, season and competition
Club	Season	League			Cup		League Cup		Continental		Other		Total	
Club	Season	Division	Apps	Goals	Apps	Goals	Apps	Goals	Apps	Goals	Apps	Goals	Apps	Goals
Huracán	2020–21 (Note: Soccerway counts Copa de la Liga Profesional appearances as league appearances.)	Primera División	1	0	0	0	0	0	—		0	0	1	0
Career total			1	0	0	0	0	0	—		0	0	1	0
