= Nicolás Cordero =

Argentine footballer

Personal information
- Full name: Nicolás Fernando Cordero
- Date of birth: 11 April 1999 (age 27)
- Place of birth: Buenos Aires, Argentina
- Height: 1.84 m (6 ft 0 in)
- Position: Forward

Team information
- Current team: Aldosivi
- Number: 9

Youth career
- Huracán

Senior career*
Years	Team	Apps	(Gls)
2016–2026	Huracán	84	(13)
2021	→ Unión (loan)	14	(2)
2023–2024	→ Querétaro (loan)	20	(1)
2024–2025	→ Argentinos Juniors (loan)	10	(0)
2025	→ Instituto (loan)	12	(0)
2026–	Aldosivi	25	(2)
- * Club domestic league appearances and goals as of 17:42, 6 November 2026 (UTC)

Nicolás Fernando Cordero (born 11 April 1999) is an Argentine professional footballer who plays as a forward for Aldosivi.

== Club career ==
Cordero's career began with Huracán. He first appeared in the club's first-team squad in July 2016, when manager Eduardo Domínguez selected as a substitute for a Copa Argentina encounter with Central Córdoba. In August 2018, Cordero made his senior debut during a round of thirty-two cup tie with fellow Argentine Primera División team Atlético Tucumán; he was subbed on for Diego Mendoza with nine minutes remaining.

On 2 July 2021, Cordero joined Unión de Santa Fe on a loan deal until the end of 2022 with a purchase option. However, due to lack of playing time, Unión confirmed at the end of January 2022, that the spell had been cut short and Cordero would return to Huracán. During his stay at Unión, he played 14 games, in which 9 were as a starter, converting two goals: one against Godoy Cruz, and the following date, a penalty kick on April 15 against Argentinos Juniors.

== International career ==
Cordero received a training call-up to the Argentina U19 squad in February 2018.

== Career statistics ==
As of 15 October 2018.

Club statistics
Club	Season	League			Cup (Note: Includes the Copa Argentina)		League Cup		Continental (Note: Includes the Copa Libertadores and Copa Sudamericana)		Other		Total	
Club	Season	Division	Apps	Goals	Apps	Goals	Apps	Goals	Apps	Goals	Apps	Goals	Apps	Goals
Huracán	2016–17	Primera División	0	0	0	0	—		0	0	0	0	0	0
Huracán	2017–18	Primera División	0	0	0	0	—		0	0	0	0	0	0
Huracán	2018–19	Primera División	0	0	1	0	—		0	0	0	0	1	0
Career total			0	0	1	0	—		0	0	0	0	1	0
