= Casco (surname) =

Casco is a surname. Notable people with the surname include:

- Agustín Casco (born 1997), Argentine professional footballer
- Gladys Bernarda Casco (born 1954), Honduran politician
- Gonzalo Casco (1533–c.1588), Spanish military leader and conquistador in what is now Paraguay
- Horacio Casco (1886–1931), Argentine fencer and politician who served as mayor of Buenos Aires
- Juan Casco (born 1945), Paraguayan retired footballer
- Milton Casco (born 1988), Argentine professional footballer
- Zelmar Casco (1926–2020), Argentine fencer who competed in the 1964 Olympics

== See also ==
- Cascos, another surname
