= Joaquín Mendive =

Argentine professional footballer

Personal information
- Full name: Joaquín Nicolás Mendive
- Date of birth: 8 August 1996 (age 30)
- Place of birth: Ezeiza, Argentina
- Height: 1.78 m (5 ft 10 in)
- Position: Goalkeeper

Team information
- Current team: Tristán Suárez

Youth career
- Tristán Suárez
- All Boys
- 2016–2017: Huracán

Senior career*
Years	Team	Apps	(Gls)
2017–2021	Huracán	0	(0)
2019–2020	→ Sacachispas (loan)	21	(0)
2021–2022	UAI Urquiza	11	(0)
2022	Ostuni 1945		
2022–2023	Ugento Calcio		
2023–	Tristán Suárez	39	(0)
- * Club domestic league appearances and goals as of 16:53, 22 August 2025 (UTC)

Joaquín Nicolás Mendive (born 8 August 1996) is an Argentine professional footballer who plays as a goalkeeper for Tristán Suárez.

== Career ==
Mendive had spells with Tristán Suárez and All Boys early in his youth career, before heading to Huracán in February 2016. He made first-team teamsheets in mid-2017, going unused on the bench for Copa Sudamericana second stage games with Paraguay's Libertad. Likewise happened six further times in all competitions, prior to the goalkeeper departing on loan in July 2019 to Sacachispas. He made his senior debut on 7 September, featuring in a Primera B Metropolitana loss away to ex-club Tristán Suárez. Mendive featured twenty-one times before the season's curtailment due to the COVID-19 pandemic.

== Career statistics ==
As of 12 November 2020.

Appearances and goals by club, season and competition
Club	Season	League			Cup		League Cup		Continental		Other		Total	
Club	Season	Division	Apps	Goals	Apps	Goals	Apps	Goals	Apps	Goals	Apps	Goals	Apps	Goals
Huracán	2017–18	Primera División	0	0	0	0	—		—		0	0	0	0
Huracán	2018–19	Primera División	0	0	0	0	0	0	0	0	0	0	0	0
Huracán	2019–20	Primera División	0	0	0	0	0	0	0	0	0	0	0	0
Huracán	2020–21 (Note: Soccerway counts Copa de la Liga Profesional appearances as league appearances.)	Primera División	0	0	0	0	0	0	—		0	0	0	0
Huracán	Total		0	0	0	0	0	0	0	0	0	0	0	0
Sacachispas (loan)	2019–20	Primera B Metropolitana	21	0	0	0	—		—		0	0	21	0
Career total			21	0	0	0	0	0	0	0	0	0	21	0
