= Matías Soler =

Argentine footballer

Personal information
- Full name: Matías Daniel Soler
- Date of birth: 18 April 1995 (age 31)
- Place of birth: San Pedro, Argentina
- Height: 1.76 m (5 ft 9 1/2 in)
- Position: Goalkeeper

Youth career
- 2007–2013: Boca Juniors
- 2013–2017: Huracán

Senior career*
Years	Team	Apps	(Gls)
2017	Plaza Colonia	7	(0)
2018–2020	Lanús	0	(0)
2020	Villa Española	0	(0)
- * Club domestic league appearances and goals

Matías Daniel Soler (born 18 April 1995) is an Argentine professional footballer who plays as a goalkeeper.

== Career ==
Soler started in the youth system of Boca Juniors, prior to joining Huracán's ranks in 2013. He departed in August 2017 to join Plaza Colonia of the Uruguayan Primera División. He made his professional debut on 16 September in a defeat to Rampla Juniors, which was one of seven appearances in a season that ended in relegation to the Uruguayan Segunda División for Plaza Colonia. He subsequently left the club at the end of 2017. Soler signed a contract with Lanús in July 2018, initially joining the reserve team. He remained until February 2020, when he left to return to Uruguayan football with Segunda División team Villa Española.

Soler wouldn't feature for El Villa due to the COVID-19 pandemic, subsequently leaving to head back to Argentina in July. He trialled with Los Andes in December 2020, featuring in a friendly against Sacachispas.

== Career statistics ==
As of 29 September 2020.

Club statistics
Club	Season	League			Cup		League Cup		Continental		Other		Total	
Club	Season	Division	Apps	Goals	Apps	Goals	Apps	Goals	Apps	Goals	Apps	Goals	Apps	Goals
Plaza Colonia	2017	Uruguayan Primera División	7	0	—		—		—		0	0	7	0
Lanús	2018–19	Argentine Primera División	0	0	0	0	0	0	0	0	0	0	0	0
Lanús	2019–20	Argentine Primera División	0	0	0	0	0	0	0	0	0	0	0	0
Lanús	Total		7	0	0	0	0	0	0	0	0	0	7	0
Villa Española	2020	Segunda División	0	0	—		—		—		0	0	0	0
Career total			7	0	0	0	—		0	0	0	0	7	0
