= Manuel García (footballer, born 8 July 1988) =

Argentine footballer

Personal information
- Full name: Juan Manuel García
- Date of birth: 8 July 1988 (age 38)
- Place of birth: Rosario, Argentina
- Height: 1.88 m (6 ft 2 in)
- Position: Goalkeeper

Youth career
- Rosario Central

Senior career*
Years	Team	Apps	(Gls)
2011–2017	Rosario Central	42	(0)
2016	→ Gimnasia LP (loan)	0	(0)
2017–2018	Deportes Antofagasta	13	(0)
2017–2018	→ Huracán (loan)	1	(0)
2018	Racing de Córdoba	6	(0)
2019	San Luis	7	(0)
2020–2021	Deportes Recoleta	18	(0)
2021	Deportes Santa Cruz	24	(0)
2022–2023	Universidad de Concepción	63	(0)
2024	Deportes Santa Cruz	16	(0)
2025	San Luis	1	(0)
Total		191	(0)
- * Club domestic league appearances and goals

Juan Manuel García (born 8 July 1988) is an Argentine former professional footballer who played as a goalkeeper.

== Career ==
García's first club were Rosario Central, he was promoted into the first-team during the 2010–11 Primera B Nacional when he was an unused substitute away to Defensa y Justicia on 19 June 2011. In the following season, 2011–12, García made twenty-four appearances including his pro debut on 25 September 2011 versus Boca Unidos. However, in the next five seasons, he featured just eighteen times. In June 2016, García was loaned to Gimnasia y Esgrima of the Argentine Primera División. He remained for half of 2016–17, but didn't make an appearance after being an unused sub fourteen times.

In January 2017, García was signed permanently by Chilean Primera División side Deportes Antofagasta. He made his debut on 19 February in a 5–0 victory over Universidad de Concepción. On 7 July 2017, after thirteen games for Antofagasta, García returned to Argentina to join Huracán on loan. He appeared three times during the 2017–18 campaign for the club. August 2018 saw García join Racing de Córdoba of Torneo Federal A. He made six appearances. In 2019, García returned to Chile as he agreed terms with Primera B's San Luis. His debut arrived on 23 February versus Deportes Temuco.

After terminating his San Luis contract on 29 July 2019, García spent the rest of the year without a club. In March 2020, Chilean Segunda División outfit Deportes Recoleta signed García. His first appearance, which was delayed due to the COVID-19 pandemic, came in a home defeat to San Antonio Unido on 16 September; it also meant he had appeared in the top three divisions of the country's system.

In 2024, García played for Deportes Santa Cruz. The next season, he returned to San Luis de Quillota after his stint in 2019. In August 2025, he was diagnosed with a degenerative neuromuscular disease, keeping his contract with San Luis until his official retirement in 2026.

== Personal life ==
Garcia's twin brother, Santiago, is also a professional footballer.

== Career statistics ==
As of 6 October 2020.

Club statistics
Club	Season	League			Cup		League Cup		Continental		Other		Total	
Club	Season	Division	Apps	Goals	Apps	Goals	Apps	Goals	Apps	Goals	Apps	Goals	Apps	Goals
Rosario Central	2010–11	Primera B Nacional	0	0	0	0	—		—		0	0	0	0
Rosario Central	2011–12	Primera B Nacional	24	0	3	0	—		—		2 (Note: Appearance(s) in Primera B Nacional play-offs)	0	29	0
Rosario Central	2012–13	Primera B Nacional	2	0	0	0	—		—		0	0	2	0
Rosario Central	2013–14	Argentine Primera División	2	0	0	0	—		—		0	0	2	0
Rosario Central	2014	Argentine Primera División	1	0	0	0	—		0	0	0	0	1	0
Rosario Central	2015	Argentine Primera División	1	0	5	0	—		—		0	0	6	0
Rosario Central	2016	Argentine Primera División	12	0	0	0	—		0	0	0	0	12	0
Rosario Central	2016–17	Argentine Primera División	0	0	0	0	—		—		0	0	0	0
Rosario Central	Total		42	0	8	0	—		0	0	2	0	52	0
Gimnasia y Esgrima (loan)	2016–17	Argentine Primera División	0	0	0	0	—		0	0	0	0	0	0
Deportes Antofagasta	2016–17	Chilean Primera División	13	0	0	0	—		—		0	0	13	0
Deportes Antofagasta	2017	Chilean Primera División	0	0	0	0	—		—		0	0	0	0
Deportes Antofagasta	2018	Chilean Primera División	0	0	0	0	—		—		0	0	0	0
Deportes Antofagasta	Total		13	0	0	0	—		—		0	0	13	0
Huracán (loan)	2017–18	Argentine Primera División	1	0	0	0	—		2 (Note: Appearance(s) in the Copa Sudamericana)	0	0	0	3	0
Racing de Córdoba	2018–19	Torneo Federal A	6	0	0	0	—		—		0	0	6	0
San Luis	2019	Primera B	7	0	0	0	—		—		0	0	7	0
Deportes Recoleta	2020	Segunda División	4	0	0	0	—		—		0	0	4	0
Career total			73	0	8	0	—		2	0	2	0	85	0

== Honours ==
Rosario Central

- Primera B Nacional: 2012–13
