= Cascos =

Cascos is a surname. Notable people with the surname include:

- Antonio Cascos (born 1963), Spanish cross-country skier
- Carlos Cascos (born 1952), Mexican-American accountant and 110th Secretary of State of Texas

== See also ==
- Francisco Álvarez-Cascos (born 1947), Spanish politician
- Casco (disambiguation)
