= Fernando Pellegrino =

Argentine footballer

Personal information
- Full name: Fernando Diego Pellegrino
- Date of birth: 31 March 1986 (age 40)
- Place of birth: Buenos Aires, Argentina
- Height: 1.97 m (6 ft 5 1/2 in)
- Position: Goalkeeper

Youth career
- River Plate

Senior career*
Years	Team	Apps	(Gls)
2006–2008	River Plate	0	(0)
2008	→ Salernitana (loan)	0	(0)
2008–2009	Instituto	1	(0)
2009–2011	Ferro Carril Oeste	3	(0)
2010–2011	→ Gimnasia y Esgrima (loan)	0	(0)
2011–2012	Atlanta	27	(0)
2012–2020	Defensa y Justicia	90	(0)
2015	→ Banfield (loan)	6	(0)
2016–2017	→ Arsenal de Sarandí (loan)	30	(0)
2017–2018	→ Sarmiento (loan)	19	(0)
2018–2019	→ Huracán (loan)	1	(0)
2019–2020	→ Huracán (loan)	3	(0)
2020–2021	Mitre	16	(0)
2021–2022	Tudelano	20	(0)
- * Club domestic league appearances and goals

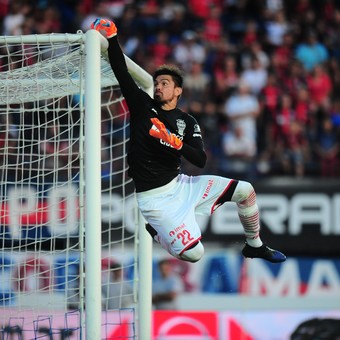
Fernando Diego Pellegrino, 2019.

Fernando Diego Pellegrino (born 31 March 1986) is a former Argentine professional footballer who played as a goalkeeper.

== Career ==
Pellegrino began in the youth ranks of River Plate. He failed to make an appearance for River Plate and left in 2008. His spell with the club did include a loan spell to Italian Serie C1 side Salernitana, but, again, he didn't feature. After returning from Salernitana and leaving River Plate, Pellegrino completed a permanent move to Instituto. However, a year later he departed after making just one league appearance. A move to Primera B Nacional club Ferro Carril Oeste followed and he made his league debut on 5 May 2010 in a 0–1 win versus Quilmes. Two further appearances came in 2009–10 for Ferro Carril Oeste.

Later in 2010, Pellegrino spent a season on loan at Argentine Primera División team Gimnasia y Esgrima but didn't play a match. After an unsuccessful spell with Gimnasia, he went back to Ferro before completing a transfer to Atlanta of Primera B Nacional. Twenty-five league appearances followed for Atlanta. On 6 July 2012, Pellegrino joined Defensa y Justicia. His debut for the team came on 11 August against Nueva Chicago. He went on to play ninety league matches for Defensa y Justicia in three seasons, including nineteen in the Primera División after the club won promotion in 2013–14.

Ahead of the 2015 Argentine Primera División season, Pellegrino joined Banfield on loan. Just seven appearances in all competitions came before he returned to his parent club. On 10 January 2016, Pellegrino agreed to join another Primera División team, Arsenal de Sarandí, on loan until 2017. Thirty league appearances followed. In July 2017, Pellegrino joined Primera B Nacional side Sarmiento on loan. He made his Sarmiento debut in a Round of 32 Copa Argentina tie against Sacachispas on 6 September. On 7 August 2018, Huracán completed the loan signing of Pellegrino. He returned in June 2019.

On 5 July 2019, Pellegrino rejoined Huracán for a second loan stint. He featured five times across the following season, with his 200th career appearance arriving on 15 March 2020 during a Copa de la Superliga defeat to Talleres.

After a spell at Mitre, Pellegrino moved to Spain where he in July 2021 signed a one-year deal with Segunda División B side CD Tudelano. On 31 May 2022, Pellegrino announced his retirement from professional football.

== Career statistics ==
As of 26 August 2020.

Club statistics
Club	Season	League			Cup		League Cup		Continental		Other		Total	
Club	Season	Division	Apps	Goals	Apps	Goals	Apps	Goals	Apps	Goals	Apps	Goals	Apps	Goals
River Plate	2007–08	Primera División	0	0	0	0	—		0	0	0	0	0	0
River Plate	2008–09	Primera División	0	0	0	0	—		0	0	0	0	0	0
River Plate	Total		0	0	0	0	—		0	0	0	0	0	0
Salernitana (loan)	2007–08	Serie C1	0	0	0	0	—		—		0	0	0	0
Instituto	2008–09	Primera B Nacional	1	0	0	0	—		—		0	0	1	0
Ferro Carril Oeste	2009–10	Primera B Nacional	3	0	0	0	—		—		0	0	3	0
Ferro Carril Oeste	2010–11	Primera B Nacional	0	0	0	0	—		—		0	0	0	0
Ferro Carril Oeste	Total		3	0	0	0	—		—		0	0	3	0
Gimnasia y Esgrima (loan)	2010–11	Primera División	0	0	0	0	—		—		0	0	0	0
Atlanta	2011–12	Primera B Nacional	27	0	0	0	—		—		0	0	27	0
Defensa y Justicia	2012–13	Primera B Nacional	29	0	1	0	—		—		0	0	30	0
Defensa y Justicia	2013–14	Primera B Nacional	42	0	0	0	—		—		0	0	42	0
Defensa y Justicia	2014	Primera División	19	0	2	0	—		—		0	0	21	0
Defensa y Justicia	2015	Primera División	0	0	0	0	—		—		0	0	0	0
Defensa y Justicia	2016	Primera División	0	0	0	0	—		—		0	0	0	0
Defensa y Justicia	2016–17	Primera División	0	0	0	0	—		—		0	0	0	0
Defensa y Justicia	2017–18	Primera División	0	0	0	0	—		—		0	0	0	0
Defensa y Justicia	2018–19	Primera División	0	0	0	0	—		0	0	0	0	0	0
Defensa y Justicia	Total		90	0	3	0	—		—		0	0	93	0
Banfield (loan)	2015	Primera División	6	0	1	0	—		—		0	0	7	0
Arsenal de Sarandí (loan)	2016	Primera División	16	0	1	0	—		—		0	0	17	0
Arsenal de Sarandí (loan)	2016–17	Primera División	14	0	2	0	—		2 (Note: Appearance(s) in the Copa Sudamericana)	0	0	0	18	0
Arsenal de Sarandí (loan)	Total		30	0	3	0	—		2	0	0	0	35	0
Sarmiento (loan)	2017–18	Primera B Nacional	19	0	1	0	—		—		5 (Note: Appearance(s) in the Primera B Nacional play-offs)	0	25	0
Huracán (loan)	2018–19	Primera División	1	0	0	0	2	0	1 (Note: Appearance(s) in the Copa Libertadores)	0	0	0	4	0
Huracán (loan)	2019–20	Primera División	3	0	0	0	1	0	1	0	0	0	5	0
Huracán (loan)	Total		4	0	0	0	3	0	2	0	0	0	9	0
Career total			180	0	8	0	3	0	4	0	5	0	200	0
