= Emanuel Morales =

Argentine footballer

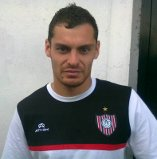
- A portrait of Emanuel David Morales

Personal information
- Full name: Emanuel David Morales
- Date of birth: 8 May 1987 (age 39)
- Place of birth: General Pico, Argentina
- Height: 1.76 m (5 ft 9 1/2 in)
- Position: Defender

Senior career*
Years	Team	Apps	(Gls)
2005–2012	CAI	134	(3)
2011–2012	→ Chacarita Juniors (loan)	34	(3)
2012–2016	Chacarita Juniors	92	(8)
2015–2016	→ Quilmes (loan)	15	(1)
2016–2020	Huracán	2	(0)
2017	→ Los Andes (loan)	0	(0)
- * Club domestic league appearances and goals

Emanuel David Morales (born 8 May 1987) is an Argentine former professional footballer who played as a defender.

== Career ==
Morales started his senior career in 2005 with CAI in Primera B Nacional, he remained with them until 2012 and made one hundred and thirty-four appearances whilst scoring three goals in the process. In his penultimate season, 2010–11, CAI were relegated to Torneo Argentino A. He subsequently spent 2011–12 out on loan with Primera B Nacional's Chacarita Juniors, making thirty-four appearances and scoring three times as Chacarita were relegated to Primera B Metropolitana; parent club CAI were also demoted from Torneo Argentino A to Torneo Argentino B. In July 2012, Chacarita signed Morales permanently.

He went on to score eight goals in ninety-two matches for Chacarita in three seasons in Primera B Metropolitana. The club were promoted back to Primera B Nacional for 2015, a season Morales spent out on loan with Argentine Primera División side Quilmes. He remained with Quilmes for the 2015 and 2016 campaigns, scoring one goal (versus Rosario Central) in sixteen games. On 30 September 2016, fellow Primera División team Huracán signed Morales. His debut arrived on 3 October during a win away against Atlético Tucumán. He featured once more for Huracán during the 2016–17 Primera División.

Morales left the club in August 2017 to join Los Andes on loan. However, he returned months later without featuring. His contract with Huracán initially ended on 30 June 2019, though was extended by a further twelve months due to Morales' health issues.

== Personal life ==
In June 2020, it was revealed that Morales had been diagnosed with amyotrophic lateral sclerosis (ALS). He initially noticed changes in his body as far back as June 2017, though was only formally diagnosed in March 2018.

== Career statistics ==
As of 11 July 2020.

Club statistics
Club	Season	League			Cup		League Cup		Continental		Other		Total	
Club	Season	Division	Apps	Goals	Apps	Goals	Apps	Goals	Apps	Goals	Apps	Goals	Apps	Goals
Huracán	2016–17	Primera División	2	0	0	0	—		0	0	0	0	2	0
Huracán	2017–18	Primera División	0	0	0	0	—		0	0	0	0	0	0
Huracán	2018–19	Primera División	0	0	0	0	0	0	0	0	0	0	0	0
Huracán	2019–20	Primera División	0	0	0	0	0	0	0	0	0	0	0	0
Huracán	Total		2	0	0	0	0	0	0	0	0	0	2	0
Los Andes (loan)	2017–18	Primera B Nacional	0	0	0	0	—		—		0	0	0	0
Career total			2	0	0	0	0	0	0	0	0	0	2	0
