= Juan Vieyra =

Argentine professional footballer

Personal information
- Full name: Juan Ignacio Vieyra
- Date of birth: 20 April 1992 (age 34)
- Place of birth: Arrecifes, Argentina
- Height: 1.75 m (5 ft 9 in)
- Position: Midfielder

Team information
- Current team: Marathón
- Number: 23

Youth career
- Newell's Old Boys

Senior career*
Years	Team	Apps	(Gls)
2012–2015	Newell's Old Boys	12	(0)
2016–2019	Cerro Porteño	4	(0)
2017–2019	→ Nacional (loan)	58	(15)
2019–2020	Huracán	8	(1)
2020	Central Córdoba SdE	11	(1)
2021	Delfín	12	(2)
2021	Cobresal	7	(0)
2022–	Marathón	7	(4)
- * Club domestic league appearances and goals as of 16:48, 10 April 2022 (UTC)

Juan Ignacio Vieyra (born 20 April 1992) is an Argentine professional footballer who plays as a central midfielder for Marathón in Honduras.

== Career ==
Vieyra began his senior career with Newell's Old Boys. He made his first-team bow on 8 December 2012 during an Argentine Primera División win away to Argentinos Juniors, which preceded a further six appearances for the midfielder in 2012–13; including his Copa Libertadores debut against Olimpia in February 2013. In total, Vieyra featured in fifteen games for Newell's in four seasons; though didn't start a league game in that time. In January 2016, Vieyra went to Paraguay with Cerro Porteño. He was selected just four times in 2016, which preceded Vieyra departing on loan to fellow Paraguayan Primera División team Nacional in 2017.

Vieyra scored on his Nacional debut, netting his first senior goal in a home loss to Deportivo Capiatá; that was one of four goals in his first campaign with them. He remained to play in two more seasons with Nacional, scoring thirteen times in the process; which included braces in 2018 over Guaraní and 3 de Febrero. Midway through 2019, on 1 August, Vieyra agreed a move back to his homeland with Huracán. His bow arrived on 18 August versus Patronato as they lost 2–1, though Vieyra did assist his team's goal. Vieyra netted his first Argentine top-flight goal in February 2020 against Godoy Cruz. He departed the club months later.

In July 2020, Vieyra headed to Central Córdoba. Following spells at Delfín in Colombia and at Cobresal in Chile, Vieyra moved to Honduras at the end of January 2022, where he signed with Marathón.

== Career statistics ==
As of 23 September 2020.

Appearances and goals by club, season and competition
Club	Season	League			Cup		League Cup		Continental		Other		Total	
Club	Season	Division	Apps	Goals	Apps	Goals	Apps	Goals	Apps	Goals	Apps	Goals	Apps	Goals
Newell's Old Boys	2012–13	Argentine Primera División	4	0	0	0	—		3 (Note: Appearance(s) in the Copa Libertadores)	0	0	0	7	0
Newell's Old Boys	2013–14	Argentine Primera División	3	0	0	0	—		0	0	0	0	3	0
Newell's Old Boys	2014	Argentine Primera División	4	0	0	0	—		—		0	0	4	0
Newell's Old Boys	2015	Argentine Primera División	1	0	0	0	—		—		0	0	1	0
Newell's Old Boys	Total		12	0	0	0	—		3	0	0	0	15	0
Cerro Porteño	2016	Paraguayan Primera División	4	0	—		—		0	0	0	0	4	0
Cerro Porteño	2017	Paraguayan Primera División	0	0	—		—		0	0	0	0	0	0
Cerro Porteño	2018	Paraguayan Primera División	0	0	0	0	—		0	0	0	0	0	0
Cerro Porteño	2019	Paraguayan Primera División	0	0	0	0	—		0	0	0	0	0	0
Cerro Porteño	Total		4	0	0	0	—		0	0	0	0	4	0
Nacional (loan)	2017	Paraguayan Primera División	13	4	—		—		2 (Note: Appearance(s) in the Copa Sudamericana)	0	0	0	15	4
Nacional (loan)	2018	Paraguayan Primera División	27	7	0	0	—		2	1	0	0	29	8
Nacional (loan)	2019	Paraguayan Primera División	18	4	0	0	—		2	1	0	0	20	5
Nacional (loan)	Total		58	15	0	0	—		6	2	0	0	64	17
Huracán	2019–20	Argentine Primera División	8	1	0	0	0	0	1	0	0	0	9	1
Central Córdoba	2020–21	Argentine Primera División	0	0	0	0	0	0	—		0	0	0	0
Career total			82	16	0	0	0	0	10	2	0	0	92	18

== Honours ==
Newell's Old Boys

- Argentine Primera División: 2012–13 Torneo Final
