= 2017–18 Club Atlético Huracán season =

Club Atlético Huracán
2017–18 season
- Chairman: Alejandro Nadur
- Manager: Juan Manuel Azconzábal (until 4 July 2017); Néstor Apuzzo (int.) (from 5 July 2017 to 11 July 2017); Gustavo Alfaro (from 12 July 2017)
- Stadium: Estadio Tomás Adolfo Ducó
- Primera División: 5th
- 2016–17 Copa Argentina: Round of 16
- 2017–18 Copa Argentina: Round of 64
- 2017 Copa Sudamericana: Second stage
- Top goalscorer: League: Two players (4); All: Ramón Ábila (5)

The 2017–18 season is Club Atlético Huracán's 5th consecutive season in the top-flight of Argentine football. The season covers the period from 1 July 2017 to 30 June 2018.

== Current squad ==
As of 6 September 2017.

Note: Flags indicate national team as defined under FIFA eligibility rules; some limited exceptions apply. Players may hold more than one non-FIFA nationality.

| No. | Pos. | Nation | Player |
|---|---|---|---|
| 1 | GK | ARG | Marcos Díaz |
| 2 | DF | ARG | Federico Mancinelli |
| 3 | DF | ARG | Ezequiel Garré |
| 4 | DF | ARG | Carlos Araujo |
| 7 | MF | ARG | Ignacio Pussetto |
| 8 | MF | ARG | Leandro Díaz |
| 9 | FW | ARG | Tomás Molina |
| 10 | MF | ARG | Daniel Montenegro |
| 15 | MF | ARG | Mariano González |
| 16 | FW | ARG | Diego Mendoza |
| 17 | MF | ARG | Alejandro Romero |
| 18 | MF | ARG | Patricio Toranzo |
| 19 | DF | ARG | Lucas Villalba (on loan from Independiente) |
| 20 | FW | ARG | Norberto Briasco |
| 21 | DF | ARG | Hugo Nervo |
| 24 | FW | ARG | Lucas Chacana |
| 25 | MF | ARG | Lucas Cuevas |

| No. | Pos. | Nation | Player |
|---|---|---|---|
| 26 | MF | ARG | Mauro Bogado |
| 28 | MF | ARG | Pablo Barboza |
| 29 | MF | ARG | Lucio Compagnucci |
| 30 | MF | ECU | Julio Angulo |
| 32 | FW | ARG | Martín Sarrafiore |
| 35 | DF | ARG | Fernando Cosciuc |
| 36 | MF | ARG | Manuel Falón |
| — | MF | ARG | Adrián Calello |
| — | DF | ARG | Carlos Matheu |
| — | DF | ARG | Christian Chimino (on loan from Temperley) |
| — | FW | ARG | Fernando Coniglio |
| — | GK | ARG | Manuel García (on loan from Deportes Antofagasta) |
| — | FW | URU | Mateo Aramburu |
| — | FW | ARG | Nazareno Solís (on loan from Boca Juniors) |
| — | DF | ARG | Pablo Álvarez (on loan from Racing Club) |
| — | FW | ARG | Ramón Ábila (on loan from Boca Juniors) |
| — | DF | PAR | Saúl Salcedo (on loan from Olimpia) |

=== Out on loan ===
Note: Flags indicate national team as defined under FIFA eligibility rules; some limited exceptions apply. Players may hold more than one non-FIFA nationality.

| No. | Pos. | Nation | Player |
|---|---|---|---|
| 11 | FW | SVK | David Depetris (at Olimpo until 30 June 2018) |
| 14 | DF | ARG | Luca Sosa (at Patronato until 30 June 2018) |
| — | FW | ARG | Rodrigo Faust (at UAI Urquiza until 30 June 2018) |

== Transfers ==
=== In ===
| Date | Pos. | Name | From | Fee |
|---|---|---|---|---|
| 27 July 2017 | FW | (Argentina) Fernando Coniglio | (Argentina) Olimpo | Undisclosed |
| 3 August 2017 | DF | (Argentina) Carlos Matheu | (Argentina) Banfield | Undisclosed |
| 21 August 2017 | MF | (Argentina) Adrián Calello | (Argentina) Quilmes | Undisclosed |
| 30 August 2017 | FW | (Uruguay) Mateo Aramburu | (Uruguay) Defensor Sporting | Undisclosed |

=== Out ===
| Date | Pos. | Name | To | Fee |
|---|---|---|---|---|
| 1 July 2017 | GK | (Argentina) Matías Giordano | Released | |
| 7 July 2017 | GK | (Argentina) Gonzalo Marinelli | (Argentina) Colón | Undisclosed |
| 7 July 2017 | MF | (Argentina) Matías Fritzler | (Argentina) Colón | Undisclosed |
| 17 July 2017 | DF | (Argentina) Nicolás Romat | (Argentina) Atlético Tucumán | Undisclosed |
| 19 July 2017 | DF | (Uruguay) Mario Risso | (Mexico) Celaya | Undisclosed |
| 26 July 2017 | MF | (Argentina) Ezequiel Gallegos | (Argentina) Platense | Undisclosed |
| 4 August 2017 | DF | (Argentina) Emanuel Morales | (Argentina) Los Andes | Undisclosed |
| 8 August 2017 | FW | (Argentina) Germán Lesman | (Argentina) Instituto | Undisclosed |
| 9 August 2017 | GK | (Argentina) Matías Soler | (Uruguay) Plaza Colonia | Undisclosed |

=== Loan in ===
| Date from | Date to | Pos. | Name | From |
|---|---|---|---|---|
| 7 July 2017 | 30 June 2018 | GK | (Argentina) Manuel García | (Chile) Deportes Antofagasta |
| 12 July 2017 | 30 June 2018 | DF | (Argentina) Christian Chimino | (Argentina) Temperley |
| 18 July 2017 | 30 June 2018 | DF | (Paraguay) Saúl Salcedo | (Paraguay) Olimpia |
| 27 July 2017 | 30 June 2018 | DF | (Argentina) Pablo Álvarez | (Argentina) Racing Club |
| 9 August 2017 | 31 December 2017 | FW | (Argentina) Ramón Ábila | (Argentina) Boca Juniors |
| 30 August 2017 | 30 June 2018 | FW | (Argentina) Nazareno Solís | (Argentina) Boca Juniors |

=== Loan out ===
| Date from | Date to | Pos. | Name | To |
|---|---|---|---|---|
| 26 July 2017 | 30 June 2018 | DF | (Argentina) Luca Sosa | (Argentina) Patronato |
| 3 August 2017 | 30 June 2018 | FW | (Argentina) Rodrigo Faust | (Argentina) UAI Urquiza |
| 28 August 2017 | 30 June 2018 | DF | (Argentina) Lucas Merolla | (Argentina) Guillermo Brown |
| 30 August 2017 | 30 June 2018 | FW | (Slovakia) David Depetris | (Argentina) Olimpo |

== Friendlies ==
=== Pre-season ===
Win Draw Loss

| 26 July 2017 Friendly | Huracán (Argentina) | 5–0 | (Argentina) Claypole | Buenos Aires, Argentina |
| 09:30 | D. Depetris; H. Nervo | Report | | Stadium: Campo de Deportes Jorge Newbery |

| 2 August 2017 Friendly | Olimpo (Argentina) | 3–0 | (Argentina) Huracán | Rosario, Argentina |
| 15:00 | M. Covea; O. Gaona Lugo; S. Llambay | Report | | Stadium: Club Teléfonos |

| 2 August 2017 Friendly | Olimpo (Argentina) | 2–0 | (Argentina) Huracán | Rosario, Argentina |
| | L. Mancinelli; J. Blanco | Report | | Stadium: Club Teléfonos |

| 15 August 2017 Friendly | Huracán (Argentina) | 2–0 | (Argentina) Colegiales | Buenos Aires, Argentina |
| | A. Romero; M. Bogado | Report | | Stadium: Campo de Deportes Jorge Newbery |

| 15 August 2017 Friendly | Huracán (Argentina) | 1–1 | (Argentina) Colegiales | Buenos Aires, Argentina |
| | J. Angulo | Report | L. Coca | Stadium: Campo de Deportes Jorge Newbery |

| 17 August 2017 Friendly | Huracán (Argentina) | 0–0 | (Argentina) Talleres | Buenos Aires, Argentina |
| | | Report | | Stadium: Estadio Tomás Adolfo Ducó |

| 17 August 2017 Friendly | Huracán (Argentina) | 2–0 | (Argentina) Talleres | Buenos Aires, Argentina |
| | I. Pussetto; A. Romero | Report | | Stadium: Estadio Tomás Adolfo Ducó |

| 18 August 2017 Friendly | Huracán (Argentina) | 2–1 | (Argentina) UAI Urquiza | Buenos Aires, Argentina |
| | D. Mendoza; M. Juárez | Report | I. Liporace | Stadium: Campo de Deportes Jorge Newbery |

| 18 August 2017 Friendly | Huracán (Argentina) | 0–1 | (Argentina) UAI Urquiza | Buenos Aires, Argentina |
| | | Report | C. Matheu (o.g.) | Stadium: Campo de Deportes Jorge Newbery |

=== Mid-season ===
Win Draw Loss

| 12 January 2018 Torneos de Verano | Huracán (Argentina) | 1–0 | (Argentina) Banfield | Mar del Plata, Argentina |
| 21:10 | N. Briasco | Report | | Stadium: Estadio José María Minella |

| 16 January 2018 Torneos de Verano | Huracán (Argentina) | 2–0 | (Argentina) San Lorenzo | Mar del Plata, Argentina |
| 22:10 | H. Nervo; M. Bogado | Report | | Stadium: Estadio José María Minella |

== Primera División ==
=== League table ===
| Pos | Team | Pld | W | D | L | GF | GA | GD | Pts | Qualification |
|---|---|---|---|---|---|---|---|---|---|---|
| 2 | Godoy Cruz | 27 | 17 | 5 | 5 | 45 | 24 | +21 | 56 | Qualification for Copa Libertadores group stage |
| 3 | San Lorenzo | 27 | 14 | 8 | 5 | 31 | 20 | +11 | 50 | Qualification for Copa Libertadores group stage |
| 4 | Huracán | 27 | 13 | 9 | 5 | 35 | 24 | +11 | 48 | Qualification for Copa Libertadores group stage |
| 5 | Talleres (C) | 27 | 13 | 7 | 7 | 33 | 20 | +13 | 46 | Qualification for Copa Libertadores second stage |
| 6 | Independiente | 27 | 13 | 7 | 7 | 29 | 19 | +10 | 46 | Qualification for Copa Sudamericana first stage |

Source: AFA
Rules for classification: 1) points; 2) play-off (only if needed to decide championship); 3) goal difference; 4) goals scored; 5) head-to-head points; 6) head-to-head goal difference; 7) head-to-head goals scored.

=== Results by matchday ===
| Matchday | 1 | 2 | 3 | 4 | 5 | 6 | 7 | 8 | 9 | 10 | 11 | 12 | 13 | 14 | 15 | 16 | 17 | 18 | 19 | 20 | 21 | 22 | 23 | 24 | 25 | 26 | 27 |
|---|---|---|---|---|---|---|---|---|---|---|---|---|---|---|---|---|---|---|---|---|---|---|---|---|---|---|---|
| Ground | A | H | A | H | A | A | H | A | H | A | H | A | H | A | H | A | H | A | H | A | H | A | H | A | H | A | H |
| Result | L | W | W | D | D | W | W | L | W | W | D | L | W | L | L | D | W | D | D | W | D | W | W | W | W | D | D |
| Position | 24 | 16 | 5 | 9 | 10 | 8 | 4 | 5 | 4 | 4 | 4 | 5 | | | | | | | | | | | | | | | 4 |

Updated to match(es) played on 12 December 2017. Source: Soccerway
A = Away; H = Home; W = Win; D = Draw; L = Loss

| 26 August 2017 1 | Independiente (Argentina) | 3–1 | (Argentina) Huracán | Avellaneda, Argentina |
| 20:05 | M. Benítez 21', 78'; L. Fernández 60' | Report | R. Ábila 18' | Stadium: Estadio Libertadores de América; Referee: Patricio Loustau (Argentina) |

| 11 September 2017 2 | Huracán (Argentina) | 1–0 | (Argentina) Newell's Old Boys | Buenos Aires, Argentina |
| 21:05 | I. Pussetto 45+2' | Report | | Stadium: Estadio Tomás Adolfo Ducó; Referee: Mauro Vigliano (Argentina) |

| 18 September 2017 3 | Gimnasia y Esgrima (Argentina) | 1–3 | (Argentina) Huracán | Buenos Aires, Argentina |
| 19:05 | N. Colazo 63' | Report | R. Ábila 30'; I. Pussetto 58', 90+3' | Stadium: Estadio Juan Carmelo Zerillo; Referee: Silvio Trucco (Argentina) |

| 23 September 2017 4 | Huracán (Argentina) | 0–0 | (Argentina) Unión Santa Fe | Buenos Aires, Argentina |
| 14:05 | | Report | | Stadium: Estadio Tomás Adolfo Ducó; Referee: Facundo Tello (Argentina) |

| 29 September 2017 5 | Defensa y Justicia (Argentina) | 0–0 | (Argentina) Huracán | Buenos Aires, Argentina |
| 19:05 | | Report | | Stadium: Estadio Norberto "Tito" Tomaghello; Referee: Hernán Mastrángelo (Argentina) |

| 16 October 2017 6 | Olimpo (Argentina) | 0–2 | (Argentina) Huracán | Bahía Blanca, Argentina |
| 19:05 | | Report | F. Coniglio 33'; M. Bogado 79' | Stadium: Estadio Roberto Natalio Carminatti; Referee: Fernando Espinoza (Argentina) |

| 28 October 2017 7 | Huracán (Argentina) | 4–0 | (Argentina) Lanús | Buenos Aires, Argentina |
| 14:00 | R. Ábila 12', 49'; A. Romero 34'; M. González 81' | Report | | Stadium: Estadio Tomás Adolfo Ducó; Referee: Jorge Baliño (Argentina) |

| 3 November 2017 8 | Godoy Cruz (Argentina) | 2–1 | (Argentina) Huracán | Mendoza, Argentina |
| 21:05 | Á. Gonzalez 43'; S. García 73' | Report | I. Pussetto 49' | Stadium: Estadio Malvinas Argentinas; Referee: Diego Abal (Argentina) |

| 21 November 2017 9 | Huracán (Argentina) | 1–0 | (Argentina) Vélez Sarsfield | Buenos Aires, Argentina |
| 21:30 | M. Bogado 25' (pen.) | Report | | Stadium: Estadio Tomás Adolfo Ducó; Referee: Mariano González (Argentina) |

| 24 November 2017 10 | Chacarita Juniors (Argentina) | 0–2 | (Argentina) Huracán | Villa Maipú, Argentina |
| 19:15 | | Report | N. Briasco 14'; M. Bogado 60' (pen.) | Stadium: Estadio de Chacarita Juniors; Referee: Fernando Rapallini (Argentina) |

| 1 December 2017 11 | Huracán (Argentina) | 1–1 | (Argentina) Patronato | Buenos Aires, Argentina |
| 21:30 | F. Coniglio 78' (pen.) | Report | A. Balboa 45+1' | Stadium: Estadio Tomás Adolfo Ducó; Referee: Nicolás Lamolina (Argentina) |

| 8 December 2017 12 | Belgrano (Argentina) | 1–0 | (Argentina) Huracán | Córdoba, Argentina |
| 21:30 | M. Suárez 83' | Report | | Stadium: El Gigante de Alberdi; Referee: Darío Herrera (Argentina) |

| 28 January 2018 13 | Huracán (Argentina) | 1-0 | (Argentina) River Plate | Buenos Aires, Argentina |
| 21:10 | I. Pussetto 29' (pen.) | Report | | Stadium: Estadio Tomás Adolfo Ducó; Referee: Germán Delfino (Argentina) |

| 4 February 2018 14 | Racing Club (Argentina) | 4–0 | (Argentina) Huracán | Avellaneda, Argentina |
| 21:30 | L. Martínez 11', 45', 77'; L. López 33' (pen.) | Report | | Stadium: Estadio Presidente Juan Domingo Perón; Referee: Jorge Baliño (Argentina) |

| 12 February 2018 15 | Huracán (Argentina) | 2–3 | (Argentina) Rosario Central | Buenos Aires, Argentina |
| 21:15 | I. Damonte 64', 90' | Report | F. Zampedri 9'; G. Herrera 45+1'; J. Pereyra 87' | Stadium: Estadio Tomás Adolfo Ducó; Referee: Patricio Loustau (Argentina) |

| 18 February 2018 16 | Arsenal (Argentina) | 1–1 | (Argentina) Huracán | Avellaneda, Argentina |
| 16:00 | L. Wilchez 36' (pen.) | Report | F. Coniglio 45+3' | Stadium: Estadio Julio Humberto Grondona; Referee: Darío Herrera (Argentina) |

| 23 February 2018 17 | Huracán (Argentina) | 1-0 | (Argentina) Estudiantes | Buenos Aires, Argentina |
| 18:00 | I. Pussetto 51' | Report | | Stadium: Estadio Tomás Adolfo Ducó; Referee: Juan Pablo Pompei (Argentina) |

| 2 March 2018 18 | Colón (Argentina) | 0–0 | (Argentina) Huracán | Santa Fe, Argentina |
| 20:15 | | Report | | Stadium: Estadio Brigadier General Estanislao López; Referee: Facundo Tello (Argentina) |

| 11 March 2018 19 | Huracán (Argentina) | 1–1 | (Argentina) San Lorenzo | Buenos Aires, Argentina |
| 16:00 | A. Chávez 44' | Report | N. Reniero 88' | Stadium: Estadio Tomás Adolfo Ducó; Referee: Fernando Echenique (Argentina) |

| 17 March 2018 20 | Temperley (Argentina) | 1–2 | (Argentina) Huracán | Temperley, Argentina |
| 12:15 | F. Sosa 80' | Report | A. Chávez 17'; I. Pussetto 57' | Stadium: Estadio Alfredo Beranger; Referee: Germán Delfino (Argentina) |

| 11 March 2018 21 | Huracán (Argentina) | 1–1 | (Argentina) Banfield | Buenos Aires, Argentina |
| 16:00 | D. Montenegro 58' | Report | D. Cvitanich 31' (pen.) | Stadium: Estadio Tomás Adolfo Ducó; Referee: Silvio Trucco (Argentina) |

| 8 April 2018 22 | San Martín de San Juan (Argentina) | 0–1 | (Argentina) Huracán | San Juan, Argentina |
| 12:15 | | Report | N. Silva 22' | Stadium: Estadio Ingeniero Hilario Sánchez; Referee: Darío Herrera (Argentina) |

| 13 April 2018 23 | Huracán (Argentina) | 1–0 | (Argentina) Argentinos Juniors | Buenos Aires, Argentina |
| 20:15 | I. Damonte 80' | Report | | Stadium: Estadio Tomás Adolfo Ducó; Referee: Jorge Baliño (Argentina) |

| 22 April 2018 24 | Tigre (Argentina) | 0–2 | (Argentina) Huracán | Victoria, Argentina |
| 10:00 | | Report | N. Silva 22'; C. Araujo 45+3' | Stadium: Estadio José Dellagiovanna; Referee: Facundo Tello (Argentina) |

| 28 April 2018 25 | Huracán (Argentina) | 3–2 | (Argentina) Atlético Tucumán | Buenos Aires, Argentina |
| 19:00 | I. Pussetto 2'; P. Álvarez 56'; N. Silva 78' | Report | I. Blanco 47'; H. Hechalar 87' | Stadium: Estadio Tomás Adolfo Ducó; Referee: Patricio Loustau (Argentina) |

| 5 May 2018 26 | Talleres de Córdoba (Argentina) | 0–0 | (Argentina) Huracán | Córdoba, Argentina |
| 16:45 | | Report | | Stadium: Estadio Mario Alberto Kempes; Referee: Mauro Vigliano (Argentina) |

| 12 May 2018 27 | Huracán (Argentina) | 3–3 | (Argentina) Boca Juniors | Buenos Aires, Argentina |
| 10:00 | I. Pussetto 5'; D. Mendoza 64'; A. Chávez 72' | Report | E. Mas 32'; W. Bou 34'; O. Benítez 43' | Stadium: Estadio Tomás Adolfo Ducó; Referee: Fernando Rapallini (Argentina) |

== Copa Argentina ==
Win Draw Loss

| 1 September 2017 R32 | Huracán (Argentina) | 1–0 | (Argentina) Colón | Buenos Aires, Argentina |
| 21:10 | R. Ábila 76' (pen.) | Report | | Stadium: Estadio Diego Armando Maradona; Referee: Andrés Merlos (Argentina) |

| 6 October 2017 R16 | Huracán (Argentina) | 0–0 (1–3 p) | (Argentina) Vélez Sarsfield | Buenos Aires, Argentina |
| 20:30 | | Report | | Stadium: Estadio Diego Armando Maradona; Referee: Patricio Loustau (Argentina) |
| | Penalties |
| | F. Coniglio (penalty scored); R. Ábila (penalty missed); P. Toranzo (penalty missed); A. Romero (penalty missed) | | G. Díaz (penalty scored); B. Cufré (penalty scored); M. Vargas (penalty scored) |

== Copa Sudamericana ==
Win Draw Loss

=== Second stage ===
| 11 July 2017 First leg | Huracán (Argentina) | 1–5 | (Paraguay) Libertad | Buenos Aires, Argentina |
| 19:15 | M. González 88' | Report | Ó. Cardozo 3', 28'; S. Salcedo 57', 84' (pen.); A. Bareiro 63' | Stadium: Estadio Tomás Adolfo Ducó; Referee: Wagner Magalhães (Brazil) |

| 1 August 2017 Second leg | Libertad (Paraguay) | 2–0 (agg: 7–1) | (Argentina) Huracán | Asunción, Paraguay |
| 19:15 | J. Recalde 48'; S. Salcedo 58' | Report | | Stadium: Estadio Dr. Nicolás Léoz; Referee: Michael Espinoza (Peru) |
