= Lorenzo Faravelli =

Argentine football central midfielder

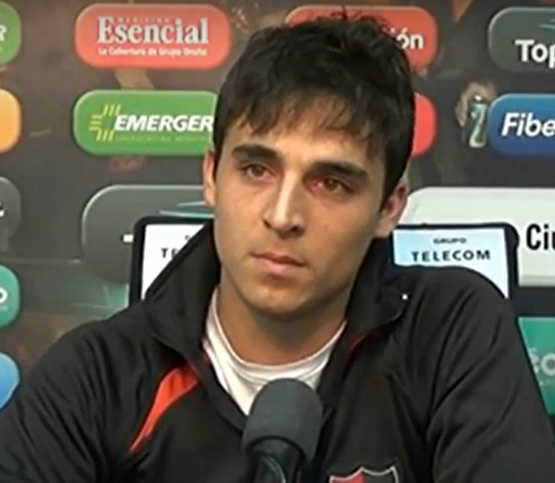
- Faravelli in 2014

Personal information
- Full name: Lorenzo Abel Faravelli
- Date of birth: 29 March 1993 (age 33)
- Place of birth: Rosario, Argentina
- Height: 1.77 m (5 ft 9 1/2 in)
- Position: Midfielder

Team information
- Current team: Necaxa
- Number: 8

Youth career
- Newell's

Senior career*
Years	Team	Apps	(Gls)
2011–2016	Newell's	24	(1)
2013–2014	→ Unión Española (loan)	30	(2)
2013	→ Unión Española B (loan)	4	(2)
2015–2016	→ Gimnasia (loan)	15	(3)
2016–2019	Gimnasia	69	(10)
2019	Huracán	8	(0)
2020–2023	Independiente	106	(18)
2024–2025	Cruz Azul	80	(11)
2026–	Necaxa	16	(0)
- * Club domestic league appearances and goals as of 21:30, 22 May 2026 (UTC)

Lorenzo Abel Faravelli (born 29 March 1993) is an Argentine professional footballer who plays as a central midfielder for Liga MX club Necaxa.

== Club career ==
=== Newell's Old Boys ===
Born in Rosario, Santa Fe, Faravelli was a Newell's Old Boys youth graduate. He made his first team – and Primera División – debut on 28 February 2011, coming on as a late substitute for Lucas Bernardi in a 1–0 away loss against Tigre.

Faravelli was regularly used under manager Javier Torrente, but featured rarely after the manager left.

==== Loan to Unión Española ====
On 7 July 2013, Faravelli moved abroad after joining Chilean Primera División side Unión Española on a one-year loan deal. He scored his first senior goal on 9 November 2013, netting the winner in a 1–0 home success over Unión La Calera.

Faravelli established himself as a starter before returning to Newell's in July 2014, but again featured rarely.

=== Gimnasia La Plata ===
In July 2015, Faravelli joined Gimnasia La Plata on loan for one year. On 11 August 2016, he signed a permanent three-year deal with the club.

=== Huracán ===
On 2 July 2019, Faravelli moved to Huracán. The following January, after failing to establish himself as a starter, he rescinded his contract.

=== Independiente del Valle ===
On 14 January 2020, Faravelli agreed to a three-year contract with Ecuadorian Serie A side Independiente del Valle.

=== Cruz Azul ===
On 30 December 2023, Liga MX side Cruz Azul announced the signing of Faravelli on a two-year contract.

== Career statistics ==
As of match played on 26 April 2026

Appearances and goals by club, season and competition
Club	Season	League			National cup (Note: Includes Copa Argentina)		Continental		Other		Total	
Club	Season	Division	Apps	Goals	Apps	Goals	Apps	Goals	Apps	Goals	Apps	Goals
Newell's	2010–11	Argentine Primera División	10	0	—		—		—		10	0
Newell's	2011–12	Argentine Primera División	1	0	1	0	—		—		2	0
Newell's	2012–13	Argentine Primera División	1	0	0	0	0	0	—		1	0
Newell's	2014	Argentine Primera División	11	1	1	0	—		—		12	1
Newell's	2015	Argentine Primera División	1	0	1	0	—		—		2	0
Newell's	Total		24	1	3	0	0	0	—		27	1
Unión Española (loan)	2013–14	Campeonato Nacional	30	2	—		7 (Note: Appearance(s) in Copa Libertadores)	0	—		37	2
Unión Española B (loan)	2013–14	Primera B de Chile	4	2	—		—		—		4	2
Gimnasia	2015	Argentine Primera División	2	0	—		—		—		2	0
Gimnasia	2016	Argentine Primera División	13	3	1	0	—		—		14	3
Gimnasia	2016–17	Argentine Primera División	23	2	0	0	2 (Note: Appearance(s) in Copa Sudamericana)	0	—		25	2
Gimnasia	2017–18	Argentine Primera División	26	4	0	0	—		—		26	4
Gimnasia	2018–19	Argentine Primera División	20	4	6	2	—		4 (Note: Appearance(s) in Copa de la Superliga)	0	30	6
Gimnasia	Total		84	13	7	2	2	0	4	0	97	15
Huracán	2019–20	Argentine Primera División	8	0	1	0	—		—		9	0
Independiente	2020	Ecuadorian Serie A	28	6	—		8	1	2 (Note: Appearance(s) in Recopa Sudamericana)	0	38	7
Independiente	2021	Ecuadorian Serie A	32	5	—		12 (Note: Ten appearances and four goals in Copa Libertadores, two appearances in Copa Sudamericana)	4	1 (Note: Appearance(s) in Supercopa Ecuador)	0	45	9
Independiente	2022	Ecuadorian Serie A	22	5	8	0	11 (Note: Four appearances in Copa Libertadores, seven appearances and three goals in Copa Sudamericana)	3	—		41	8
Independiente	2023	Ecuadorian Serie A	24	2	—		6	1	3 (Note: One appearance in Supercopa Ecuador, two appearances in Recopa Sudamericana)	1	33	4
Independiente	Total		106	18	8	0	37	9	6	1	157	28
Cruz Azul	2023–24	Liga MX	23	3	—		—		—		23	3
Cruz Azul	2024–25	Liga MX	38	8	—		8 (Note: Appearances in CONCACAF Champions Cup)	1	4 (Note: Appearances in Leagues Cup)	0	50	9
Cruz Azul	2025–26	Liga MX	19	0	—		0	0	4 (Note: Three appearances in Leagues Cup, one appearance in FIFA Intercontinental Cup)	0	23	0
Cruz Azul	Total		80	11	0	0	8	1	8	0	96	12
Necaxa	2025–26	Liga MX	16	0	—		—		—		16	0
Career total			352	47	19	2	54	10	18	1	443	60

== Honours ==
Newell's Old Boys

- Argentine Primera División: 2012–13 Torneo Final

Independiente del Valle

- Ecuadorian Serie A: 2021
- Copa Sudamericana: 2022

Cruz Azul

- CONCACAF Champions Cup: 2025
