= Ezeiza, Buenos Aires =

City in Buenos Aires Province, Argentina

José María Ezeiza
- City
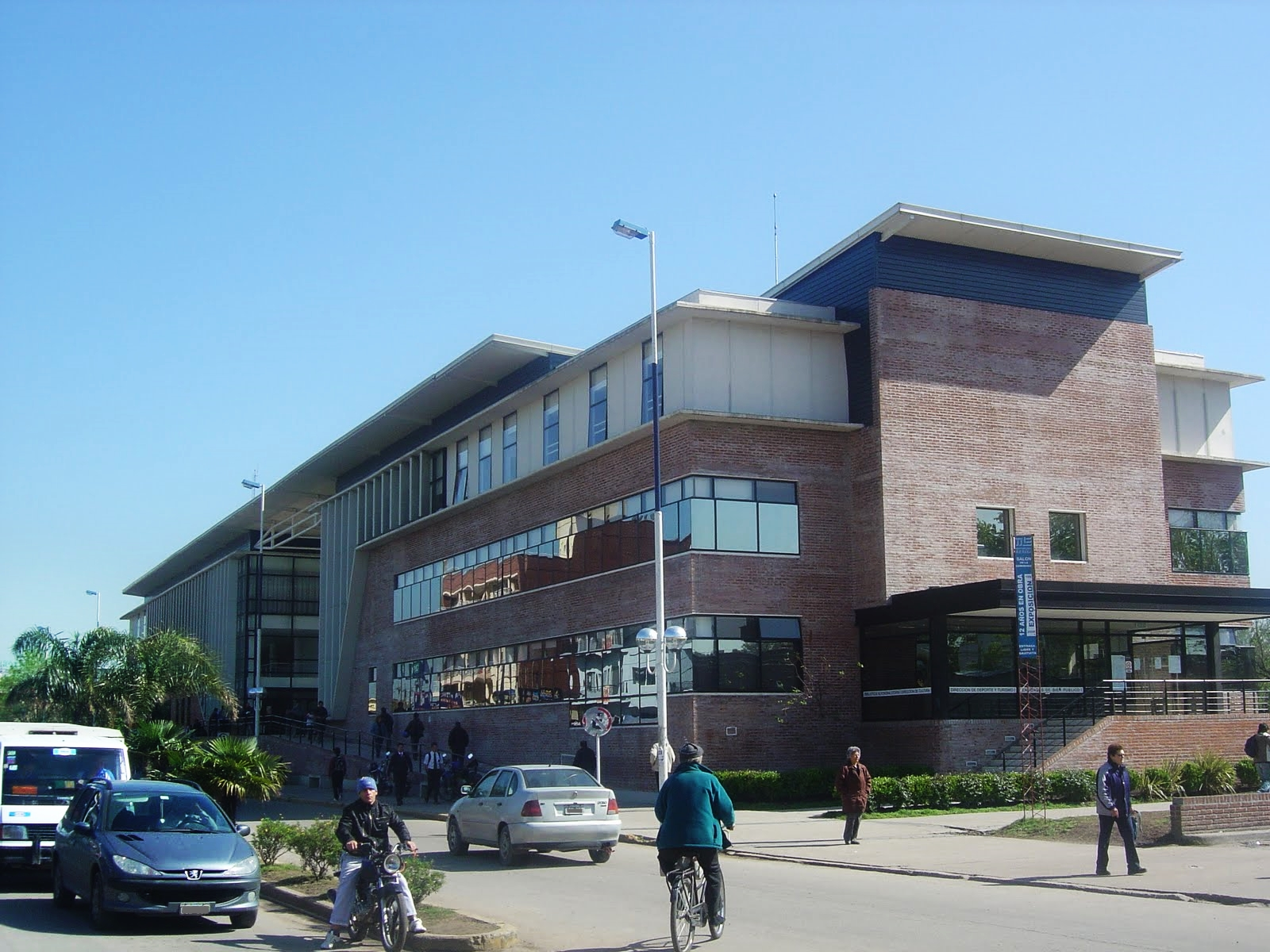
- City Hall

- Location in Greater Buenos Aires
- Coordinates: 34°50′S 58°31′W
- Country: Argentina
- Province: Buenos Aires
- Partido: Ezeiza
- Founded: 17 July 1885
- Elevation: 12 m (39 ft)

Population (2010 census)
  - Total: 160,219
- Demonym: Ezeizenses
- CPA Base: B 1804
- Area code: +54 11
- Website: Official website

Ezeiza (Latin American Spanish: [eˈsejsa]) is the capital city of the Ezeiza Partido within the Greater Buenos Aires area in Argentina. The city had a population of 160,219 in 2010. Ezeiza is one of the fastest-growing cities in Argentina; the city and its surroundings are known for the many gated communities there, as well as for the Ministro Pistarini International Airport and the Ezeiza Federal Prison Complex. Ezeiza and its surroundings are known as affluent areas.

== History ==
Inhabited originally by the Querandí people, the land was then claimed by the Conquistadores in 1588. The first estancia (Los Remedios) and chapel in the area were founded by Juan Guillermo González y Aragón in 1758; one of González's great-grandsons was Manuel Belgrano, one of the most notable leaders of the Argentine War of Independence. Gerónimo Ezeiza bought land nearby in 1767, and by the late 19th century his descendant José María Ezeiza became the largest landowner in the area. Following his death, Ezeiza's son-in-law donated land to the Buenos Aires Western Railway, and the town was founded around the new line on 17 July 1885; it was named in honor of the late José María Ezeiza.

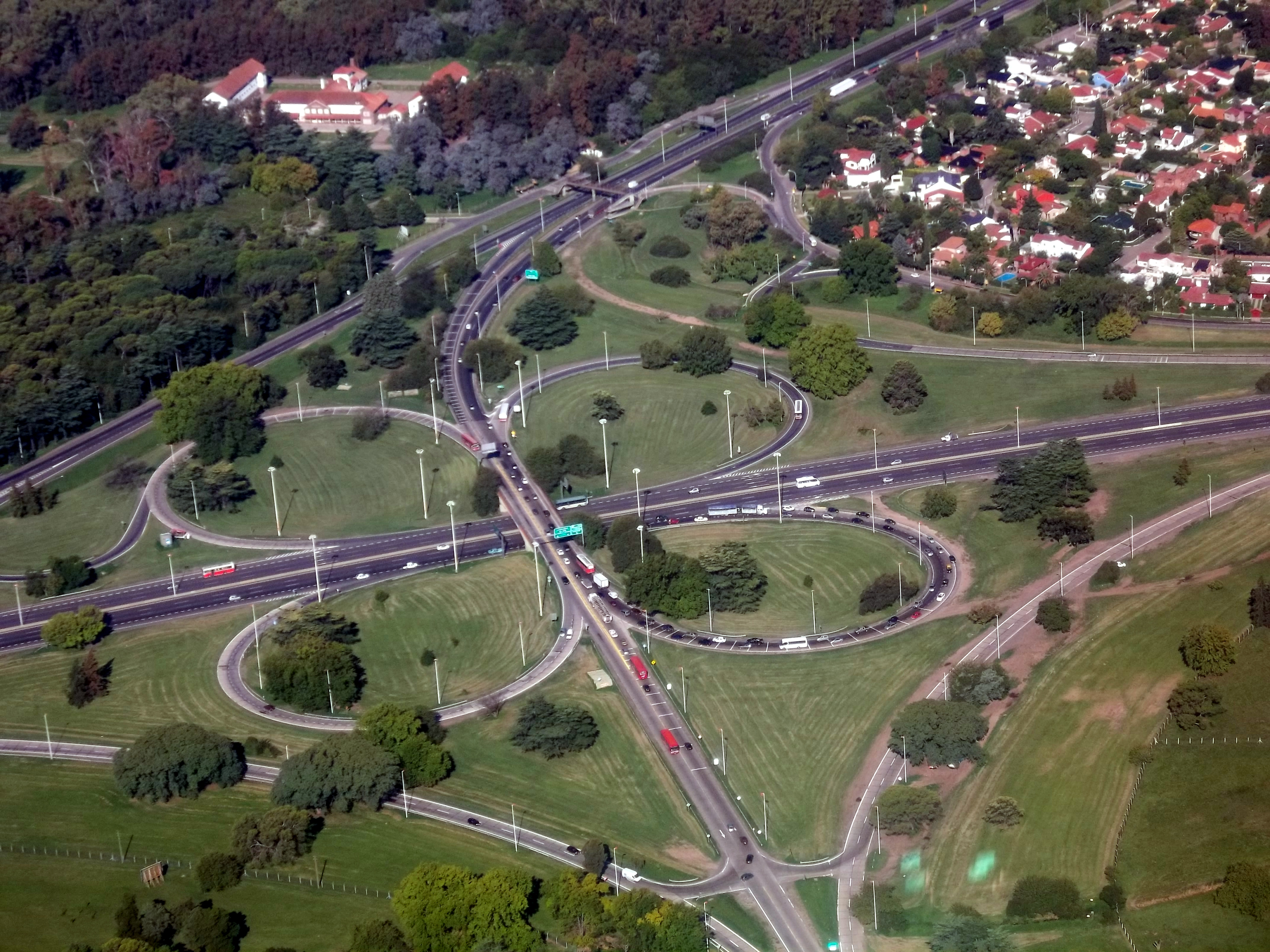
Cloverleaf interchange between the Ricchieri Freeway and the Ezeiza-Cañuelas Freeway, near Pistarini International Airport. The Barrio Uno subdivision is visible on the upper right-hand corner.

Dairy farming dominated the Ezeiza landscape during the early 20th century. The town was chosen as the site of the nation's first international airport, which was inaugurated on the northern end of the city in 1949; a new neighborhood, Barrio Uno, was built just north of the airport that year to house its employees, and the Ricchieri Freeway was opened in 1952 to connect the new airport to the city of Buenos Aires. The National Atomic Energy Commission established the Ezeiza Atomic Center, a leading producer of radioisotopes for medical use, in 1967. The freeway was scene of the Ezeiza Massacre, in which at least 13 died in clashes between left and right-wing Peronists vying for the best vantage points from which to view the motorcade for exiled former President Juan Perón upon his return to Argentina on 20 June 1973.

Ezeiza grew steadily afterward as a bedroom community, and a number of gated communities were developed (particularly in or near Canning, south of the city) from the 1990s onward. The Bosques de Ezeiza ('Ezeiza Woods') are likewise an important tourist attraction for the area.

Other important institutions include the Dr. Alberto Eurnekian Hospital (2008), and the Provincial University of Ezeiza - which opened its doors in 2012 as the first university dedicated to aeronautics in Latin America; a proposal was submitted later that year to the National University Council by the school for its nationalization.

Part of Esteban Echeverría Partido since its establishment in 1913, Ezeiza was made the seat of its namesake county upon its own establishment in 1994. A new, postmodern city hall was inaugurated in 2007.

== Climate ==
Climate data for Ministro Pistarini International Airport, Ezeiza (1991–2020, extremes 1961–present)
Month	Jan	Feb	Mar	Apr	May	Jun	Jul	Aug	Sep	Oct	Nov	Dec	Year
Record high °C (°F)	42.0 (107.6)	38.8 (101.8)	39.1 (102.4)	34.1 (93.4)	30.2 (86.4)	28.2 (82.8)	31.5 (88.7)	34.0 (93.2)	34.3 (93.7)	35.8 (96.4)	38.6 (101.5)	41.1 (106.0)	42.0 (107.6)
Mean daily maximum °C (°F)	30.3 (86.5)	28.8 (83.8)	26.8 (80.2)	22.9 (73.2)	19.0 (66.2)	15.9 (60.6)	15.0 (59.0)	17.5 (63.5)	19.3 (66.7)	22.2 (72.0)	25.8 (78.4)	29.0 (84.2)	22.7 (72.9)
Daily mean °C (°F)	24.1 (75.4)	23.0 (73.4)	21.0 (69.8)	17.1 (62.8)	13.6 (56.5)	10.8 (51.4)	9.8 (49.6)	11.8 (53.2)	13.8 (56.8)	16.8 (62.2)	20.0 (68.0)	22.7 (72.9)	17.0 (62.6)
Mean daily minimum °C (°F)	17.9 (64.2)	17.1 (62.8)	15.4 (59.7)	11.8 (53.2)	8.9 (48.0)	6.1 (43.0)	5.2 (41.4)	6.6 (43.9)	8.3 (46.9)	11.2 (52.2)	13.8 (56.8)	16.2 (61.2)	11.5 (52.7)
Record low °C (°F)	6.3 (43.3)	3.8 (38.8)	1.9 (35.4)	−0.4 (31.3)	−5.0 (23.0)	−7.8 (18.0)	−5.8 (21.6)	−4.8 (23.4)	−4.2 (24.4)	−1.4 (29.5)	0.0 (32.0)	3.0 (37.4)	−7.8 (18.0)
Average precipitation mm (inches)	99.8 (3.93)	108.5 (4.27)	100.1 (3.94)	100.6 (3.96)	70.3 (2.77)	48.4 (1.91)	56.9 (2.24)	59.3 (2.33)	65.4 (2.57)	106.6 (4.20)	99.5 (3.92)	99.5 (3.92)	1,014.9 (39.96)
Average precipitation days (≥ 0.1 mm)	7.6	7.3	7.4	8.1	6.7	6.6	6.4	6.2	7.0	9.2	8.2	7.7	88.5
Average snowy days	0.0	0.0	0.0	0.0	0.1	0.0	0.1	0.0	0.0	0.0	0.0	0.0	0.1
Average relative humidity (%)	65.6	70.6	74.2	77.3	79.7	78.5	77.6	73.8	71.7	71.9	67.0	64.1	72.7
Source: Servicio Meteorológico Nacional

== Notable people ==
- Félix Décima (born 1979), footballer
- Joaquín Mendive (born 1996), footballer for CSyD Tristán Suárez
