= Pablo Barboza =

Argentine footballer

Personal information
- Full name: Pablo Damián Barboza
- Date of birth: 25 April 1996 (age 30)
- Place of birth: Argentina
- Height: 1.75 m (5 ft 9 in)
- Position: Midfielder

Team information
- Current team: Sacachispas (on loan from Huracán)

Youth career
- Huracán

Senior career*
Years	Team	Apps	(Gls)
2017–	Huracán	0	(0)
2018–	→ Sacachispas (loan)	5	(1)
- * Club domestic league appearances and goals as of 18:00, 15 October 2018 (UTC)

Pablo Damián Barboza (born 25 April 1996) is an Argentine professional footballer who plays as a midfielder for Sacachispas, on loan from Huracán.

== Career ==
Barboza began with Huracán. He was selected as a substitute twice in 2017, in an Argentine Primera División match with Unión Santa Fe on 16 June and in a Copa Sudamericana tie with Libertad on 11 July, but went unused on both occasions. In July 2018, Barboza joined Sacachispas of Primera B Metropolitana on loan. He made his professional debut on 17 August against Barracas Central, prior to scoring his first senior goal during a defeat to All Boys two weeks later.

== Career statistics ==
As of 15 October 2018.

Club statistics
Club	Season	League			Cup (Note: Includes the Copa Argentina)		League Cup		Continental (Note: Includes the Copa Libertadores and Copa Sudamericana)		Other		Total	
Club	Season	Division	Apps	Goals	Apps	Goals	Apps	Goals	Apps	Goals	Apps	Goals	Apps	Goals
Huracán	2016–17	Primera División	0	0	0	0	—		0	0	0	0	0	0
Huracán	2017–18	Primera División	0	0	0	0	—		0	0	0	0	0	0
Huracán	2018–19	Primera División	0	0	0	0	—		0	0	0	0	0	0
Huracán	Total		0	0	0	0	—		0	0	0	0	0	0
Sacachispas (loan)	2018–19	Primera B Metropolitana	5	1	0	0	—		—		0	0	5	1
Career total			5	1	0	0	—		0	0	0	0	5	1
