= Félix Décima =

Argentine footballer

Personal information
- Full name: Félix Raúl Décima
- Date of birth: 7 September 1979 (age 47)
- Place of birth: Ezeiza, Argentina
- Height: 1.75 m (5 ft 9 in)
- Position: Midfielder

Senior career*
Years	Team	Apps	(Gls)
1998–2005	Ferro Carril Oeste	163	(7)
2005–2006	Brown de Adrogué	23	(2)
2006–2009	San Martín SJ	61	(0)
2009–2010	San Martín Tucumán	20	(0)
2010	Unión Villa Krause	8	(1)
2011	Deportivo Español	9	(0)
2011–2012	Complejo Deportivo	21	(0)
2012–2014	Unión Aconquija	55	(2)
2014	Atlético Policial	15	(0)
- * Club domestic league appearances and goals

Félix Raúl Décima (born 7 September 1979 in Ezeiza) is a retired Argentine football midfielder.

== See also ==
- Football in Argentina
- List of football clubs in Argentina
