= Federico Marín =

Argentine footballer

Personal information
- Full name: Federico Marín
- Date of birth: 24 March 1998 (age 28)
- Place of birth: Hurlingham, Argentina
- Height: 1.77 m (5 ft 10 in)
- Position: Midfielder

Team information
- Current team: Colegiales

Youth career
- Huracán

Senior career*
Years	Team	Apps	(Gls)
2018–2025	Huracán	9	(0)
2019	→ Defensores (loan)	1	(0)
2022	→ Sacachispas (loan)	15	(1)
2022–2023	→ Atlanta (loan)	30	(0)
2024	→ Guillermo Brown (loan)	32	(1)
2025–	Colegiales	29	(0)
- * Club domestic league appearances and goals as of 17:22, 25 April 2026 (UTC)

Federico Marín (born 24 March 1998) is an Argentine professional footballer who plays as a midfielder for Colegiales.

== Career ==
Marín was moved into the first-team squad of Argentine Primera División side Huracán for the 2018–19 season, with manager Gustavo Alfaro selecting him for his professional debut on 30 September 2018 during a win away to Belgrano; he had previously been an unused substitute on four occasions in league and cup.

In December 2019 it was reported, that Marín and his teammate, Walter Pérez, alongside eight other young people had been accused of raping an 18-year-old girl jointly.

== Career statistics ==
As of 14 October 2018.

Club statistics
Club	Season	League			Cup (Note: Includes the Copa Argentina)		League Cup		Continental (Note: Includes the Copa Libertadores)		Other		Total	
Club	Season	Division	Apps	Goals	Apps	Goals	Apps	Goals	Apps	Goals	Apps	Goals	Apps	Goals
Huracán	2018–19	Primera División	1	0	0	0	—		0	0	0	0	1	0
Career total			1	0	0	0	—		0	0	0	0	1	0
