= Manuel Falón =

Argentine footballer

Personal information
- Full name: Manuel Agustín Falón
- Date of birth: 5 July 1995 (age 31)
- Place of birth: Buenos Aires, Argentina
- Height: 1.70 m (5 ft 7 in)
- Position: Midfielder

Team information
- Current team: Sacachispas

Youth career
- Huracán

Senior career*
Years	Team	Apps	(Gls)
2017–2018	Huracán	1	(0)
2019–	Sacachispas	19	(2)
- * Club domestic league appearances and goals as of 17:11, 6 October 2020 (UTC)

Manuel Agustín Falón (born 5 July 1995) is an Argentine professional footballer who plays as a midfielder for Sacachispas.

== Career ==
Falón's career began in 2017 with Argentine Primera División side Huracán. He made his senior debut during the 2016–17 Argentine Primera División campaign, coming on as a substitute for Mariano González in a defeat to Independiente on 20 May 2017. He terminated his contract in June 2018 due to problems with the club and in his personal life; his deal was due to run until 2020. After a year out of the game travelling, Falón completed a move to Sacachispas of Primera B Metropolitana in July 2019. His first appearance came on 3 August versus UAI Urquiza, he then scored his first senior goal against Almirante Brown on 24 August.

== Career statistics ==
As of 6 October 2020.

Club statistics
Club	Season	League			Cup		League Cup		Continental		Other		Total	
Club	Season	Division	Apps	Goals	Apps	Goals	Apps	Goals	Apps	Goals	Apps	Goals	Apps	Goals
Huracán	2016–17	Primera División	1	0	0	0	—		0	0	0	0	1	0
Huracán	2017–18	Primera División	0	0	0	0	—		0	0	0	0	0	0
Huracán	Total		1	0	0	0	—		0	0	0	0	1	0
Sacachispas	2019–20	Primera B Metropolitana	19	2	0	0	—		—		0	0	19	2
Career total			20	2	0	0	—		0	0	0	0	20	2
