= Lucas Cuevas =

Argentine footballer

Personal information
- Full name: Lucas Ezequiel Cuevas
- Date of birth: 9 November 1996 (age 30)
- Place of birth: Buenos Aires, Argentina
- Height: 1.75 m (5 ft 9 in)
- Position: Midfielder

Team information
- Current team: Thesprotos

Youth career
- Huracán

Senior career*
Years	Team	Apps	(Gls)
2017–2018	Huracán	1	(0)
2018–2020	Villa Dálmine	22	(0)
2021	Deportivo Madryn	11	(0)
2022–2023	All Boys	14	(0)
2023–	Thesprotos	11	(0)
- * Club domestic league appearances and goals as of 16 June 2023

Lucas Ezequiel Cuevas (born 9 November 1996) is an Argentine professional footballer who plays as a midfielder for Super League Greece 2 club Thesprotos.

== Career ==
Cuevas was promoted into Huracán's first-team squad midway through the 2016–17 Argentine Primera División season. He was an unused substitute against Defensa y Justicia and Patronato, prior to making his professional debut after playing the final twelve minutes in an away draw versus Estudiantes on 23 April 2017. July 2018 saw Cuevas join Villa Dálmine of Primera B Nacional.

After a spell at Deportivo Madryn in 2021

== Career statistics ==
As of 9 September 2018.

Club statistics
Club	Season	League			Cup (Note: Includes the Copa Argentina)		League Cup		Continental (Note: Includes the Copa Sudamericana)		Other		Total	
Club	Season	Division	Apps	Goals	Apps	Goals	Apps	Goals	Apps	Goals	Apps	Goals	Apps	Goals
Huracán	2016–17	Primera División	1	0	0	0	—		0	0	0	0	1	0
Huracán	2017–18	Primera División	0	0	0	0	—		0	0	0	0	0	0
Huracán	Total		1	0	0	0	—		0	0	0	0	1	0
Villa Dálmine	2018–19	Primera B Nacional	1	0	0	0	—		0	0	0	0	1	0
Career total			1	0	0	0	—		0	0	0	0	1	0
