= Mateo Aramburu =

Uruguayan footballer (born 1998)

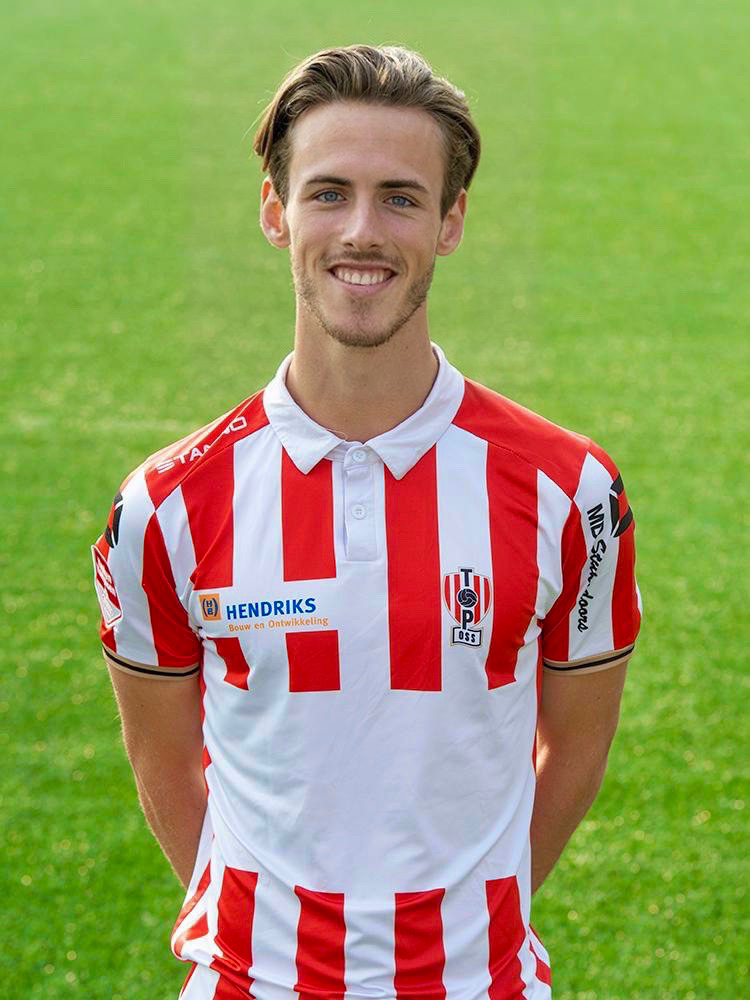
- Aramburu with TOP Oss in 2020

Personal information
- Full name: Mateo Sebastian Aramburu Birch
- Date of birth: 10 March 1998 (age 28)
- Place of birth: Guatemala City, Guatemala
- Height: 1.88 m (6 ft 2 in)
- Position: Forward

Team information
- Current team: Huracán FC (on loan from Montevideo City Torque)
- Number: 10

Youth career
- –2015: Comunicaciones
- 2015–2017: Defensor Sporting

Senior career*
Years	Team	Apps	(Gls)
2017-2018	Huracán	0	(0)
2018–2019	Le Touquet	1	(0)
2018–2019	Barnsley	0	(0)
2020–2021	TOP Oss	5	(0)
2021	Wuppertaler SV	18	(7)
2021–2022	FC Schalke 04 II	31	(6)
2022–2023	Phönix Lübeck	5	(1)
2024	Progreso	13	(0)
2025–	Montevideo City Torque	0	(0)
2025–	→ Huracán FC (loan)	0	(0)
- * Club domestic league appearances and goals as of 12:00, 1 June 2025 (UTC)

Mateo Sebastian Aramburu Birch (born 10 March 1998) is a Uruguayan professional footballer who plays as a forward for Huracán FC, on loan from Montevideo City Torque.

== Club career ==
=== Early career ===
Born in Guatemala City to an English mother and a Uruguayan father, Aramburu started playing for the Comunicaciones youth ranks in Guatemala. He joined Defensor Sporting in Uruguay in 2015, where he signed his first 3 year professional contract. At age 19, he moved to Argentina to represent Huracán. In 2019, he played 1 season in his mother's home country, England, for Barnsley.

=== TOP Oss ===
In early 2020, he went on trial with Dutch club Den Bosch where he would have signed if not for the COVID-19 pandemic affecting all professional football. He then moved to TOP Oss in the summer of 2020, and made his debut for the club as a starter on 5 September in a 3–0 away loss to Roda JC Kerkrade.

=== Wuppertaler SV ===
On 1 February 2021, Aramburu signed with Regionalliga club Wuppertaler SV after a successful trial. He made his debut on 24 February in a 1–0 win over Alemannia Aachen, coming on as a substitute in the 80th minute. On 6 March, he scored his first senior goal in a 2–0 win over Schalke 04 II, a game in which he also provided an assist.

=== Schalke 04 II ===
On 14 June 2021, it was announced that Aramburu had signed with Schalke 04, joining their reserve team.

=== Phönix Lübeck ===
Aramburu joined Regionalliga Nord club Phönix Lübeck on 3 February 2023, after six months as a free agent. Two days later he made his debut for the club, replacing Björn Lambach in the 69th minute of a 2–1 league loss to FC Teutonia Ottensen. He suffered an ankle injury during practice on 16 March, sidelining him for several months. He made his comeback on 10 May, scoring the final goal of a 6–1 victory against BSV Schwarz-Weiß Rehden.
