= Casco, Missouri =

Extinct town in Missouri, United States

Coordinates: 38.4703286°N 91.1690385°W

Casco is an extinct town in Franklin County, in the U.S. state of Missouri.

A post office called Casco was established in 1871, and remained in operation until 1908. The community's name is a transfer from Casco, Maine.
