= Gonzalo Bettini =

Argentine footballer

Personal information
- Date of birth: 26 September 1991 (age 35)
- Place of birth: Buenos Aires, Argentina
- Height: 1.71 m (5 ft 7 in)
- Position: Right-back

Team information
- Current team: Colón
- Number: 14

Youth career
- Banfield

Senior career*
Years	Team	Apps	(Gls)
2011–2018	Banfield	112	(4)
2018–2019	Rosario Central	20	(0)
2019–2020	Huracán	17	(0)
2021	Central Córdoba SdE	30	(0)
2022–2023	Sarmiento	71	(1)
2024	San Martín Tucumán	35	(0)
2025–	Colón	4	(0)
- * Club domestic league appearances and goals as of 17:13, 14 June 2025 (UTC)

Gonzalo Bettini (born 26 September 1992) is an Argentine professional footballer who plays as a right-back for Colón.

== Career ==
=== Huracán ===
On 27 June 2019, Bettini joined Club Atlético Huracán on a one-year contract.

== Honours ==
Rosario Central

- Copa Argentina: 2017–18
