= Agustín Casco =

Argentine footballer

Personal information
- Full name: Agustín Ramon Casco
- Date of birth: 28 January 1997 (age 29)
- Place of birth: Villa Gesell, Argentina
- Height: 1.72 m (5 ft 7 1/2 in)
- Position: Left-back

Team information
- Current team: Box Hill United

Youth career
- San Lorenzo de Villa Gesell
- River Plate
- Huracán

Senior career*
Years	Team	Apps	(Gls)
2018–2021	Huracán	1	(0)
2019	→ Sacachispas (loan)	6	(0)
2020–2021	→ Real Pilar (loan)		
2021–2022	Ferro GP	11	(1)
2023	Colón		
2024–	Box Hill United		
- * Club domestic league appearances and goals as of 31 October 2021

Agustín Ramon Casco (born 28 January 1997) is an Argentine professional footballer who plays as a left-back for Australian club Box Hill United.

== Career ==
Casco's career began with San Lorenzo de Villa Gesell, prior to joining River Plate and subsequently Huracán. The 2018–19 Argentine Primera División campaign saw Casco appear in Huracán's first-team squad, with the defender being an unused substitute for a match with Independiente on 21 October 2018. He made his professional debut three weeks later, featuring for the last ten minutes of a win over Godoy Cruz on 12 November. After a further appearance in the Copa Libertadores versus Deportivo Lara in May 2019, Casco had a six-month loan stint in Primera B Metropolitana with Sacachispas to end the year.

== Career statistics ==
As of 23 June 2020.

Club statistics
Club	Season	League			Cup (Note: Includes the Copa Argentina)		League Cup		Continental		Other		Total	
Club	Season	Division	Apps	Goals	Apps	Goals	Apps	Goals	Apps	Goals	Apps	Goals	Apps	Goals
Huracán	2018–19	Primera División	1	0	0	0	0	0	1 (Note: Appearance(s) in the Copa Libertadores)	0	0	0	2	0
Huracán	2019–20	Primera División	0	0	0	0	0	0	0	0	0	0	0	0
Huracán	Total		1	0	0	0	0	0	1	0	0	0	2	0
Sacachispas (loan)	2019–20	Primera B Metropolitana	6	0	0	0	—		—		0	0	6	0
Career total			7	0	0	0	0	0	1	0	0	0	8	0
