= USS Casco =

USS Casco is a name used more than once by the United States Navy:

- USS Casco (1864), a monitor in commission from 1864 to 1865
- USS Casco (ID-1957), a cargo ship in commission from 1918 to 1919
- USS Casco (AVP-12), a seaplane tender in commission from 1941 to 1947

== See also ==
- USCGC Casco (WAVP-370) (later (WHEC-370)
