= Casco Peak =

Mountain summit in Colorado, United States

- Location within Colorado

Highest point
- Elevation: 13,915 ft (4,241 m)
- Prominence: 648 ft (198 m)
- Isolation: 1.17 mi (1.88 km)
- Coordinates: 39°06′51″N 106°29′38″W

Geography
- Location: Lake County, Colorado, U.S.
- Parent range: Sawatch Range, Elbert Massif
- Topo map(s): USGS 7.5' topographic map Mount Elbert, Colorado

Casco Peak is a high mountain summit in the Sawatch Range of the Rocky Mountains of North America. The 13,915-foot (4,241 m) thirteener is located on the Elbert Massif in San Isabel National Forest, 3.8 miles (6.1 km) east (bearing 84°) of Independence Pass in Lake County, Colorado, United States.

== See also ==
- List of Colorado mountain ranges
- List of Colorado mountain summits
  - List of Colorado fourteeners
  - List of Colorado 4000 meter prominent summits
  - List of the most prominent summits of Colorado
- List of Colorado county high points
