= Matías Juárez =

Argentine footballer

Personal information
- Full name: Matías Daniel Juárez Romero
- Date of birth: 3 January 1997 (age 29)
- Place of birth: Córdoba, Argentina
- Height: 1.75 m (5 ft 9 in)
- Position: Midfielder

Youth career
- Huracán

Senior career*
Years	Team	Apps	(Gls)
2016–2019	Huracán	0	(0)
- * Club domestic league appearances and goals as of 00:56, 30 September 2018 (UTC)

Matías Daniel Juárez Romero (born 3 January 1997) is an Argentine professional footballer who plays as a midfielder.

== Career ==
Juárez got his professional career underway with Huracán. He first appeared on a first-team teamsheet in February 2016, being an unused substitute for a Copa Libertadores match with Atlético Nacional on 24 February; as well as in the Argentine Primera División versus San Lorenzo days later. Five months after, in July, Juárez made his senior debut in the Copa Argentina against Central Córdoba; he was subbed on for the final nine minutes in place of Norberto Briasco-Balekian. Juárez next featured again in the same competition thirteen months following in a tie with Colón.

== Career statistics ==
As of 30 September 2018.

Club statistics
Club	Season	League			Cup (Note: Includes the Copa Argentina)		League Cup		Continental (Note: Includes the Copa Libertadores and Copa Sudamericana)		Other		Total	
Club	Season	Division	Apps	Goals	Apps	Goals	Apps	Goals	Apps	Goals	Apps	Goals	Apps	Goals
Huracán	2016	Primera División	0	0	0	0	—		0	0	0	0	0	0
Huracán	2016–17	Primera División	0	0	1	0	—		0	0	0	0	1	0
Huracán	2017–18	Primera División	0	0	1	0	—		0	0	0	0	1	0
Huracán	2018–19	Primera División	0	0	0	0	—		—		0	0	0	0
Career total			0	0	2	0	—		0	0	0	0	2	0
