= Lucas Merolla =

Argentine footballer

Personal information
- Full name: Lucas Gabriel Merolla
- Date of birth: 27 June 1995 (age 31)
- Place of birth: Buenos Aires, Argentina
- Height: 1.96 m (6 ft 5 in)
- Position: Centre-back

Team information
- Current team: Cerro Porteño

Youth career
- Nueva Chicago
- Huracán

Senior career*
| Years | Team | Apps | (Gls) |
| 2016–2023 | Huracán | 77 | (3) |
| 2016–2019 | → Deportivo Español (loan) | 33 | (3) |
| 2017–2018 | → Guillermo Brown (loan) | 21 | (2) |
| 2023–2026 | Mazatlán | 51 | (1) |
| 2026– | Cerro Porteño | 0 | (0) |
- * Club domestic league appearances and goals as of 21 September 2024

Lucas Gabriel Merolla (born 27 June 1995) is an Argentine footballer who plays as a central defender for División de Honor club Cerro Porteño.

== Club career ==
=== Huracán ===
Merolla was born in Buenos Aires, and joined Huracán's youth setup from Nueva Chicago. Promoted to the main squad for the 2016 season, he was an unused substitute in two first team matches before leaving.

==== Loan to Deportivo Español ====
In 2016, Merolla was loaned to Primera B Metropolitana side Deportivo Español on loan. He made his senior debut on 28 August of that year, starting in a 1–0 home win over Defensores de Belgrano.

Merolla scored his first goal on 2 April 2017, netting his team's second in a 3–1 away success over Atlanta. He finished the season with three goals in 36 appearances as Deportivo Español reached the promotion play-offs but missed out after losing to eventual winners Deportivo Riestra.

==== Loan to Guillermo Brown ====
On 28 August 2017, Merolla joined Primera B Nacional side Guillermo Brown. Again regularly used, he scored twice in 22 appearances overall during the season.

==== Breakthrough ====
Merolla returned to Huracán in July 2018, but was not used by manager Gustavo Alfaro. He only made his first team – and Primera División – debut for the club on 10 March 2019, playing the full 90 minutes in a 3–1 home loss against San Martín de Tucumán; it was his only league appearance of the campaign.

Merolla started to feature more regularly from September 2019, after manager Juan Pablo Vojvoda departed the club and interim Néstor Apuzzo took over; on 1 November, he renewed his contract until June 2023, with a US$ 20 million release clause. He scored his first goal in the top tier (and for the Quemeros) on 24 March 2021, netting the equalizer in a 1–1 draw at Atlético Tucumán.

In February 2023, Merolla was separated from the first team squad after failing to agree to a contract renewal.

== Career statistics ==
As of 28 February 2023.

Club statistics
| Club | Season | League | | | Cup (Note: Includes the Copa Argentina) | | League Cup (Note: Includes the Copa de la Superliga) | | Continental (Note: Includes the Copa Libertadores and Copa Sudamericana) | | Other (Note: Includes the Primera B Metropolitana play-offs) | | Total | |
| Club | Season | Division | Apps | Goals | Apps | Goals | Apps | Goals | Apps | Goals | Apps | Goals | Apps | Goals |
|---|---|---|---|---|---|---|---|---|---|---|---|---|---|---|
| Huracán | 2016 | Primera División | 0 | 0 | 0 | 0 | — | | 0 | 0 | — | | 0 | 0 |
| Huracán | 2016–17 | Primera División | 0 | 0 | — | | — | | — | | — | | 0 | 0 |
| Huracán | 2017–18 | Primera División | 0 | 0 | — | | — | | — | | — | | 0 | 0 |
| Huracán | 2018–19 | Primera División | 1 | 0 | 0 | 0 | 1 | 0 | 1 | 0 | — | | 3 | 0 |
| Huracán | 2019–20 | Primera División | 13 | 0 | 2 | 0 | 1 | 0 | 2 | 0 | — | | 18 | 0 |
| Huracán | 2020–21 | Primera División | 7 (Note: Soccerway counts Copa de la Liga Profesional appearances as league appearances.) | 0 | 1 | 0 | — | | — | | — | | 8 | 0 |
| Huracán | 2021 | Primera División | 28 | 2 | 0 | 0 | — | | — | | — | | 28 | 2 |
| Huracán | 2022 | Primera División | 27 | 1 | 1 | 0 | — | | — | | — | | 28 | 1 |
| Huracán | 2023 | Primera División | 1 | 0 | 0 | 0 | — | | 0 | 0 | — | | 1 | 0 |
| Huracán | Total | | 77 | 3 | 3 | 0 | 2 | 0 | 3 | 0 | — | | 85 | 3 |
| Deportivo Español (loan) | 2016–17 | Primera B Metropolitana | 33 | 3 | 0 | 0 | — | | — | | 3 | 0 | 36 | 3 |
| Guillermo Brown (loan) | 2017–18 | Primera B Nacional | 21 | 2 | 1 | 0 | — | | — | | — | | 22 | 2 |
| Career total | | | 131 | 8 | 4 | 0 | 2 | 0 | 3 | 0 | 3 | 0 | 143 | 8 |
