= Daniel Hernández (footballer, born 1990) =

Colombian footballer

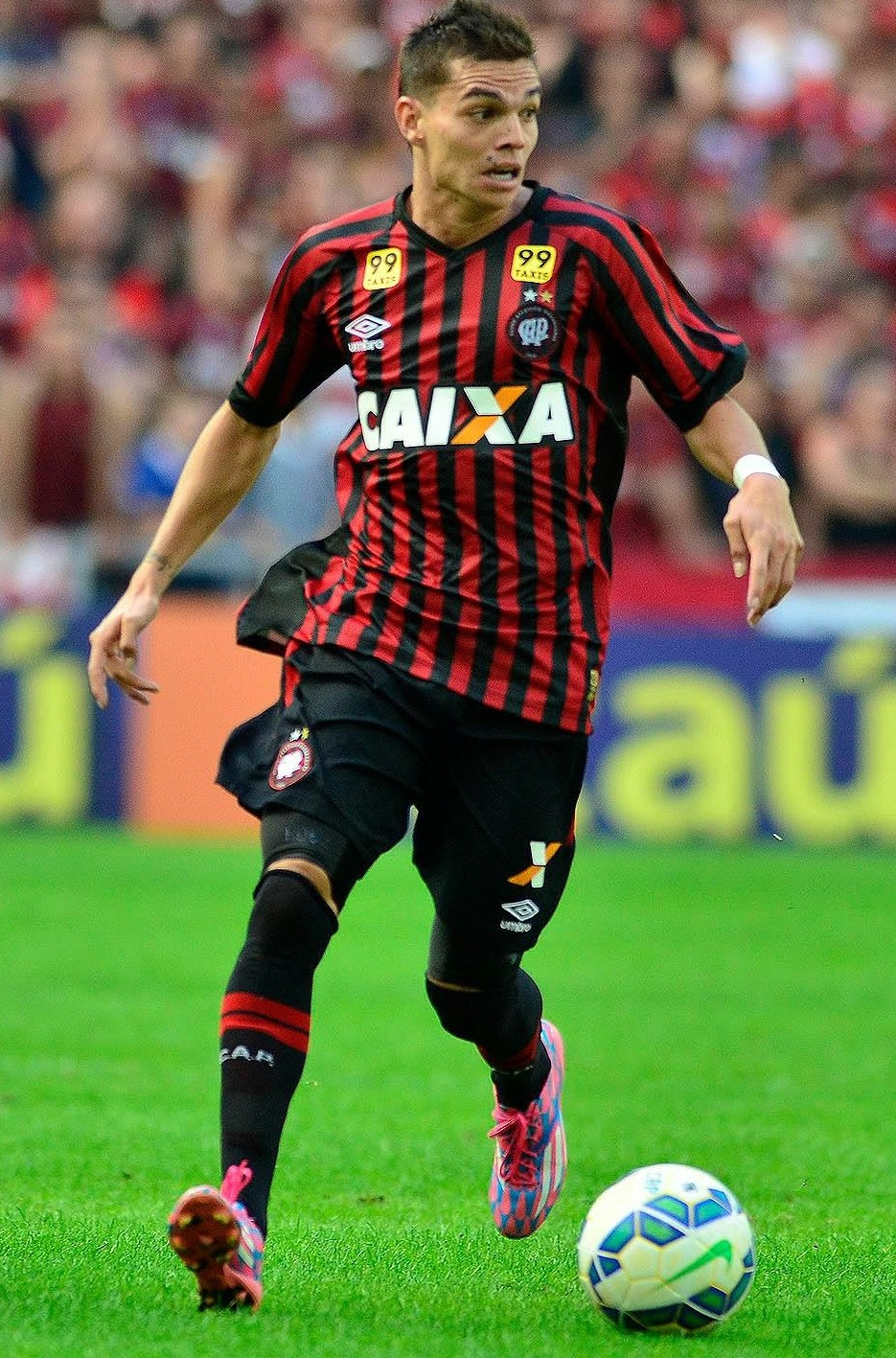

Personal information
- Full name: Daniel Alejandro Hernández González
- Date of birth: 10 December 1990 (age 35)
- Place of birth: Medellín, Colombia
- Height: 1.76 m (5 ft 9 1/2 in)
- Position: Attacking midfielder

Team information
- Current team: Atlético Huila

Youth career
- Deportivo Rionegro

Senior career*
| Years | Team | Apps | (Gls) |
| 2011 | Deportivo Rionegro | 2 | (0) |
| 2012–2013 | Cortuluá | 44 | (2) |
| 2013–2017 | Once Caldas | 55 | (10) |
| 2014–2015 | → Independiente Medellín (loan) | 39 | (4) |
| 2015 | → Atlético Paranaense (loan) | 19 | (0) |
| 2016–2017 | → Baniyas (loan) | 10 | (3) |
| 2017 | → Rionegro Águilas (loan) | 32 | (8) |
| 2018 | Rionegro Águilas | 9 | (0) |
| 2018 | San Lorenzo | 2 | (1) |
| 2019 | Huracán | 3 | (0) |
| 2019–2020 | Deportivo Pasto | 17 | (0) |
| 2020–2021 | Al-Shorta | 1 | (0) |
| 2021–2022 | América de Cali | 28 | (1) |
| 2023– | Atlético Huila | 9 | (0) |
- * Club domestic league appearances and goals as of 17 August 2023

Daniel Alejandro Hernández González (born 10 December 1990) is a Colombian footballer who plays for Atlético Huila as a midfielder.

== Career statistics ==
| Club | Season | League | | | Cup | | | Continental | | | Total | | |
| Club | Season | Apps | Goals | Assist | Apps | Goals | Assist | Apps | Goals | Assist | Apps | Goals | Assist |
|---|---|---|---|---|---|---|---|---|---|---|---|---|---|
| Deportivo Rionegro | 2011 | 2 | 0 | 0 | 1 | 0 | 0 | - | - | - | 3 | 0 | 0 |
| Cortuluá | 2012 | 35 | 2 | 0 | 5 | 0 | 0 | - | - | - | 40 | 2 | 0 |
| Cortuluá | 2013 | 9 | 0 | 0 | 4 | 0 | 0 | - | - | - | 13 | 0 | 0 |
| Cortuluá | Total | 44 | 2 | 0 | 9 | 0 | 0 | - | - | - | 53 | 2 | 0 |
| Once Caldas | 2013 | 14 | 3 | 2 | 0 | 0 | 0 | - | - | - | 14 | 3 | 2 |
| Once Caldas | 2014 | 16 | 1 | 4 | 0 | 0 | 0 | - | - | - | 16 | 1 | 4 |
| Once Caldas | Total | 30 | 4 | 6 | 0 | 0 | 0 | - | - | - | 30 | 4 | 6 |
| Independiente Medellín | 2014 | 24 | 1 | 4 | 8 | 0 | 0 | - | - | - | 32 | 1 | 4 |
| Independiente Medellín | 2015 | 15 | 3 | 0 | 4 | 1 | 0 | - | - | - | 19 | 4 | 0 |
| Independiente Medellín | Total | 39 | 4 | 4 | 12 | 1 | 0 | - | - | - | 51 | 5 | 4 |
| Athletico Paranaense | 2015 | 19 | 0 | 4 | 0 | 0 | 0 | 6 | 1 | 1 | 25 | 1 | 5 |
| Once Caldas | 2016 | 25 | 6 | 4 | 5 | 0 | 0 | - | - | - | 30 | 6 | 4 |
| Baniyas | 2016-17 | 10 | 3 | 2 | 1 | 1 | 0 | - | - | - | 11 | 4 | 2 |
| Rionegro Águilas | 2017 | 32 | 8 | 2 | 6 | 1 | 0 | 2 | 0 | 0 | 40 | 9 | 2 |
| Rionegro Águilas | 2018 | 9 | 0 | 1 | 0 | 0 | 0 | 0 | 0 | 0 | 9 | 0 | 1 |
| Rionegro Águilas | Total | 41 | 8 | 3 | 6 | 1 | 0 | 2 | 0 | 0 | 49 | 9 | 3 |
| San Lorenzo | 2018-19 | 2 | 1 | 1 | 1 | 0 | 0 | 0 | 0 | 0 | 3 | 1 | 1 |
| Huracán | 2018-19 | 3 | 0 | 0 | 0 | 0 | 0 | 0 | 0 | 0 | 3 | 0 | 0 |
| Deportivo Pasto | 2019 | 11 | 0 | 0 | 4 | 0 | 0 | 0 | 0 | 0 | 15 | 0 | 0 |
| Deportivo Pasto | 2020 | 6 | 0 | 0 | 0 | 0 | 0 | 2 | 0 | 0 | 8 | 0 | 0 |
| Deportivo Pasto | Total | 17 | 0 | 0 | 4 | 0 | 0 | 2 | 0 | 0 | 23 | 0 | 0 |
| América de Cali | 2021 | 2 | 0 | 0 | 0 | 0 | 0 | 0 | 0 | 0 | 2 | 0 | 0 |
| América de Cali | 2022 | 22 | 1 | 1 | 2 | 1 | 0 | 1 | 0 | 0 | 25 | 2 | 1 |
| América de Cali | Total | 24 | 1 | 1 | 2 | 1 | 0 | 1 | 0 | 0 | 27 | 2 | 1 |
| Career totals | | 256 | 29 | 25 | 41 | 4 | 0 | 11 | 1 | 1 | 308 | 34 | 26 |
