= Juan Garro =

Argentine footballer

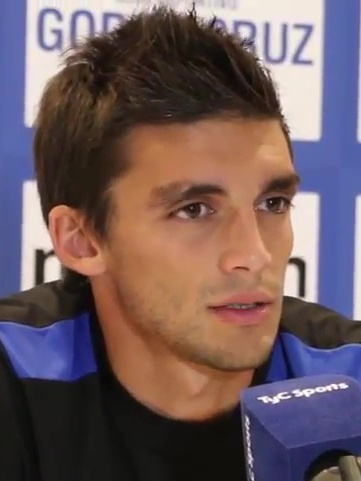
- Garro with Godoy Cruz in 2018

Personal information
- Full name: Juan Fernando Garro
- Date of birth: 24 November 1992 (age 33)
- Place of birth: Mendoza, Argentina
- Height: 1.79 m (5 ft 10 in)
- Position: Right winger

Team information
- Current team: Estudiantes RC
- Number: 27

Youth career
- Godoy Cruz

Senior career*
Years	Team	Apps	(Gls)
2011–2018	Godoy Cruz	86	(17)
2018–2024	Huracán	56	(5)
2021–2022	→ Newell's Old Boys (loan)	51	(6)
2023–2024	→ PAS Giannina (loan)	13	(1)
2024	Palestino	8	(0)
2025	Atlético Grau	24	(2)
2026–	Estudiantes RC	8	(0)
- * Club domestic league appearances and goals as of 17:48, 8 November 2026 (UTC)

Juan Fernando "Juanfi" Garro (born 24 November 1992) is an Argentine professional footballer who plays as a winger for Estudiantes RC.

== Career ==
Garro started his senior career with Godoy Cruz. He made his professional debut in April 2011 during a 3–1 win over Huracán, prior to scoring his first goal for the club on his Copa Argentina debut against Sportivo Italiano on 24 November 2011 while his first league goal came in the Argentine Primera División in April 2012 versus Newell's Old Boys. In total, Garro scored sixteen times in eighty-two games in all competitions throughout his first eight seasons with Godoy Cruz between 2011 and 2017. After nine campaigns, Garro left in July 2018 to play for Huracán.

In the second half of 2024, Garro moved to Chile and joined Palestino.

== Career statistics ==
As of 9 September 2018.

Club statistics
Club	Season	League			Cup (Note: Includes the Copa Argentina)		League Cup		Continental (Note: Includes the Copa Libertadores and Copa Sudamericana)		Other (Note: Includes the Argentine Primera División play-offs)		Total	
Club	Season	Division	Apps	Goals	Apps	Goals	Apps	Goals	Apps	Goals	Apps	Goals	Apps	Goals
Godoy Cruz	2010–11	Primera División	1	0	0	0	—		0	0	0	0	1	0
Godoy Cruz	2011–12	Primera División	9	1	1	1	—		0	0	0	0	10	2
Godoy Cruz	2012–13	Primera División	2	0	1	0	—		—		0	0	3	0
Godoy Cruz	2013–14	Primera División	8	1	1	0	—		—		0	0	9	1
Godoy Cruz	2014	Primera División	6	0	1	0	—		1 (Note: One appearance in 2014 Copa Sudamericana)	0	0	0	8	0
Godoy Cruz	2015	Primera División	22	7	0	0	—		—		0	0	22	7
Godoy Cruz	2016	Primera División	5	0	0	0	—		—		1 (Note: One appearance in 2016 Argentine Primera División play-offs)	0	6	0
Godoy Cruz	2016–17	Primera División	14	3	3	0	—		6 (Note: Six appearances in 2017 Copa Libertadores)	3 (Note: Three goals in 2017 Copa Libertadores)	0	0	23	6
Godoy Cruz	2017–18	Primera División	19	5	3	0	—		2 (Note: Two appearances in 2017 Copa Libertadores)	0	0	0	24	5
Godoy Cruz	Total		86	17	10	1	—		9	3	1	0	106	21
Huracán	2018–19	Primera División	4	0	2	0	—		0	0	0	0	6	0
Career total			90	17	12	1	—		9	3	1	0	112	21
