= Walter Pérez (footballer) =

Argentine footballer (born 1998)

Personal information
- Full name: Walter Gabriel Pérez
- Date of birth: 23 October 1998 (age 28)
- Place of birth: Argentina
- Height: 1.75 m (5 ft 9 in)
- Position: Left-back

Youth career
- Proyecto Barcelona
- 2012–2018: Huracán

Senior career*
Years	Team	Apps	(Gls)
2018–2022	Huracán	65	(2)
- * Club domestic league appearances and goals as of 23 October 2022

Walter Gabriel Pérez (born 23 October 1998) is an Argentine former professional footballer who played as a left-back. Today he is serving a sentence of 11 years in prison for the crime of sexual abuse.

== Career ==
Pérez, after signing from Proyecto Barcelona, began his senior career with Huracán. The 2018–19 Argentine Primera División season saw the defender promoted into Gustavo Alfaro's first-team squad, with his professional bow arriving on 12 August 2018 during a goalless draw at home to River Plate; he was substituted off in place of Mauro Bogado after seventy-eight minutes.

In December 2019, Pérez was one of ten men who were arrested for a gang rape. The incident took place in a rented house in Villa Carlos Paz, which the boys had rented for holidays. A few hours later, all 10, including Peréz' Huracán-teammate Federico Marín, were arrested and jailed for 'doubly aggravated sexual abuse' of an 18-year-old girl. After spending almost 8 months in prison, Peréz was released in September 2020.

== Career statistics ==
As of 1 November 2018.

Club statistics
Club	Season	League			Cup (Note: Includes the Copa Argentina)		League Cup		Continental		Other		Total	
Club	Season	Division	Apps	Goals	Apps	Goals	Apps	Goals	Apps	Goals	Apps	Goals	Apps	Goals
Huracán	2018–19	Primera División	8	0	0	0	—		—		0	0	8	0
Career total			8	0	0	0	—		—		0	0	8	0
