= Diego Mendoza =

Argentine footballer

Personal information
- Date of birth: 30 September 1992 (age 34)
- Place of birth: General Madariaga Partido, Argentina
- Height: 1.85 m (6 ft 1 in)
- Position: Forward

Team information
- Current team: UD Ibiza (on loan from Huracán)
- Number: 18

Senior career*
| Years | Team | Apps | (Gls) |
| 2013–2015 | Estudiantes LP | 19 | (4) |
| 2013–2014 | → Villa San Carlos (loan) | 17 | (3) |
| 2014 | → Nueva Chicago (loan) | 16 | (3) |
| 2016– | Huracán | 44 | (6) |
| 2019 | → Belgrano (loan) | 10 | (0) |
| 2019– | → UD Ibiza (loan) | 14 | (4) |
- * Club domestic league appearances and goals as of 01:29, 7 February 2020 (UTC)

Diego Mendoza (born 30 September 1992) is an Argentine footballer who plays for UD Ibiza on loan from Club Atlético Huracán as a forward.
