= Sacachispas Fútbol Club =

Argentine association football club

Sacachispas
- Full name: Sacachispas Fútbol Club
- Nicknames: Los Villeros; Saca; Lila
- Founded: 17 October 1948; 77 years ago
- Ground: Beto Larossa, Villa Soldati; Buenos Aires
- Capacity: 7,000
- Chairman: Facundo Spinelli
- Manager: Damian Troncoso
- League: Primera B
- 2024: 18th
Home colours	Away colours

Sacachispas Fútbol Club is an Argentine football club from the Villa Soldati district of Buenos Aires. The team currently plays in Primera B Metropolitana, the regionalised third division of the Argentine football league system.

== History ==
In 1948, Roberto González and Aldo Vázquez, neighbors of Nueva Pompeya at the south of Buenos Aires, decided to form a football team to play the Evita championships. Vázquez played at River Plate lower divisions and contacted former player Carlos Peucelle (who was the coordinator by then) with the objective of River Plate allowed some of its players to play for the recently formed team.

The name "Sacachispas" was taken from the fictitious squad that starred in Pelota de Trapo, a movie that had been a huge success in Argentina. Sacachispas reached the Evita championship final at Estadio Monumental, with president Juan Perón and his wife Eva Duarte (who had given her name to the tournament) attending the match. After Perón noted that Sacachispas did not have a field, he made the arrangements to get a land where the club could build a stadium.

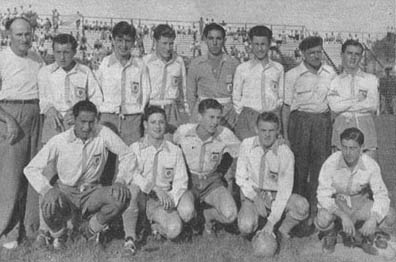
The Sacachispas team that won the Primera D championship in 1954

The first stadium was built in Lacarra and Corrales Avenue. The club set an official date of foundation on October 17, 1948, as a tribute to Perón's intercession. Sacachispas affiliated to the Argentine Football Association in 1954, winning the Primera D tournament in its debut season. Nevertheless, Sacachispas has never reached the Primera División.

In 2012, the club changed its name to "Sacachispas Mercado Central Fútbol Club", after an agreement signed with Club Atlético Mercado Central, the sports club of Mercado Central de Buenos Aires. The agreement stated that the Mercado Central would make a monthly payment of $ 100,000 to Sacachispas. This agreement was an alliance but not a merger of both clubs.

Nevertheless, the agreement between Sacachispas and Mercado Central came to an end in 2014 and Sacachispas returned to its original name and emblem.

== Titles ==
- Primera C: 2016–17
- Primera D: 1954, 1999–2000, 2002–03
