= 2015 Club Atlético River Plate season =

Club Atlético River Plate
2015 season
- President: Rodolfo D'Onofrio
- Manager: Marcelo Gallardo
- Stadium: Estadio Monumental Antonio Vespucio Liberti
- Primera División: 9th
- Copa Libertadores: Winners
- Copa Sudamericana: Semi-finals
- Copa Argentina: Round of 32
- Recopa: Winners
- FIFA Club World Cup: Runners-up
- Suruga Bank: Winners
- Supercopa Argentina: Runners-up
- Biggest win: Atlético Rafaela 1–5 River
- Biggest defeat: River 0–3 Barcelona
Home colours	Away colours	Third colours

The 2015 season is Club Atlético River Plate's 4th consecutive season in the top-flight of Argentine football. The season began on February 13 and ended on December 6.

== Season events ==
On February 11, River Plate defeated San Lorenzo de Almagro and obtained the 2015 Recopa Sudamericana.

On May 19, River Plate introduced the new third kit, featuring shades of red and black.

On July 3, River Plate lost to Rosario Central and was eliminated from the 2014-15 Copa Argentina at the Round of 32 stage.

On August 5, River Plate defeated Tigres UANL and obtained the 2015 Copa Libertadores.

On August 11, River Plate defeated Gamba Osaka at the Osaka Expo '70 Stadium and obtained the 2015 Suruga Bank Championship.

On December 16, River Plate made its debut on the FIFA Club World Cup, defeating Sanfrecce Hiroshima and qualifying to the 2015 FIFA Club World Cup Final.

On December 20, River Plate lost to FC Barcelona and ended the 2015 FIFA Club World Cup as runner-up.

== Squad Winter ==
Note: Flags indicate national team as defined under FIFA eligibility rules; some limited exceptions apply. Players may hold more than one non-FIFA nationality.

No.	Pos.	Nation	Player
1	GK	ARG	Marcelo Barovero (Vice-Captain)
2	DF	ARG	Jonatan Maidana
3	DF	COL	Eder Alvarez Balanta
4	MF	ARG	Guido Rodríguez
5	MF	ARG	Matías Kranevitter
6	DF	ARG	Ramiro Funes Mori
7	FW	URU	Rodrigo Mora
8	MF	URU	Carlos Sanchez
9	FW	ARG	Fernando Cavenaghi (Captain)
10	MF	ARG	Pity Martínez
14	DF	ARG	Augusto Solari
15	MF	ARG	Leonardo Pisculichi
16	MF	ARG	Ariel Rojas
17	MF	ARG	Martin Aguirre
18	MF	URU	Camilo Mayada

No.	Pos.	Nation	Player
19	FW	COL	Teofilo Gutierrez
20	DF	ARG	Germán Pezzella
21	DF	ARG	Leonel Vangioni
23	MF	ARG	Leonardo Ponzio (3rd Captain)
24	DF	ARG	Emanuel Mammana
25	DF	ARG	Gabriel Mercado
27	MF	ARG	Ezequiel Cirigliano
29	FW	ARG	Giovanni Simeone
30	MF	ARG	Tomas Martinez
31	FW	ARG	Lucas Boye
32	FW	ARG	Sebastián Driussi
33	GK	ARG	Julio Chiarini
34	FW	ARG	Juan Cruz Kaprof
35	MF	ARG	Pablo Aimar
42	GK	ARG	Augusto Batalla

== Squad Summer ==
Note: Flags indicate national team as defined under FIFA eligibility rules; some limited exceptions apply. Players may hold more than one non-FIFA nationality.

No.	Pos.	Nation	Player
1	GK	ARG	Marcelo Barovero (Vice-Captain)
2	DF	ARG	Jonatan Maidana
3	DF	COL	Eder Alvarez Balanta
4	MF	ARG	Guido Rodríguez
5	MF	ARG	Matías Kranevitter
6	DF	ARG	Ramiro Funes Mori
7	FW	URU	Rodrigo Mora
8	MF	URU	Carlos Sanchez
9	FW	ARG	Fernando Cavenaghi (Captain)
10	MF	ARG	Pity Martínez
11	FW	ARG	Javier Saviola
13	FW	ARG	Lucas Alario
14	DF	ARG	Augusto Solari

No.	Pos.	Nation	Player
15	MF	ARG	Leonardo Pisculichi
18	MF	URU	Camilo Mayada
19	MF	URU	Tabare Viudez
20	DF	ARG	Milton Casco
21	DF	ARG	Leonel Vangioni
22	MF	ARG	Nicolás Bertolo
23	MF	ARG	Leonardo Ponzio (3rd Captain)
24	DF	ARG	Emanuel Mammana
25	DF	ARG	Gabriel Mercado
27	MF	ARG	Lucho Gonzalez
32	FW	ARG	Sebastián Driussi
33	GK	ARG	Julio Chiarini
42	GK	ARG	Augusto Batalla

== Transfers ==
=== In Winter ===
Number	Pos.	Name	From
10	MF	(Argentina) Pity Martinez	(Argentina) Club Atletico Huracan
18	MF	(Uruguay) Camilo Mayada	(Uruguay) Danubio FC
35	MF	(Argentina) Pablo Aimar	(Malaysia) Johor Darul Takzim

=== Out Winter ===
Number	Pos.	Name	To
11	MF	(Argentina) Osmar Ferreira	(Argentina) Atletico Tucuman
13	DF	(Argentina) Bruno Urribarri	(Argentina) Atletico Rafaela

=== In Summer ===
Number	Pos.	Name	From
11	FW	(Argentina) Javier Saviola	(Italy) Hellas Verona
13	FW	(Argentina) Lucas Alario	(Argentina) Club Atletico Colon
19	MF	(Uruguay) Tabare Viudez	(Turkey) Kasımpaşa SK
22	MF	(Argentina) Nicolas Bertolo	(Argentina) Club Atletico Banfield
27	MF	(Argentina) Lucho Gonzalez	(Qatar) Al-Rayyan

=== Out Summer ===
Number	Pos.	Name	To
16	MF	(Argentina) Ariel Rojas	(Mexico) Cruz Azul
17	MF	(Argentina) Martin Aguirre	Retired
19	FW	(Colombia) Teofilo Gutierrez	(Portugal) Sporting Lisboa
20	DF	(Argentina) German Pezzella	(Spain) Real Betis
35	MF	(Argentina) Pablo Aimar	Retired

=== In Middle Season ===
Number	Pos.	Name	From
20	DF	(Argentina) Milton Casco	(Argentina) Newell's Old Boys

=== Out Middle Season ===
Number	Pos.	Name	To
6	DF	(Argentina) Ramiro Funes Mori	(England) Everton FC
9	FW	(Argentina) Fernando Cavenaghi	(Cyprus) APOEL Nicosia

=== Loan out ===
Number	Pos.	Name	To
27	MF	(Argentina) Ezequiel Cirigliano	(United States) Dallas FC
29	FW	(Argentina) Giovanni Simeone	(Argentina) Club Atletico Banfield
30	MF	(Argentina) Tomas Martinez	(Spain) Tenerife
31	FW	(Argentina) Lucas Boye	(Argentina) Newell's Old Boys
34	FW	(Argentina) Juan Cruz Kaprof	(France) FC Metz

== Primera División ==
=== League table ===
Pos	Team	Pld	W	D	L	GF	GA	GD	Pts	Qualification
7	Estudiantes (LP)	30	14	9	7	34	28	+6	51	2016 Copa Sudamericana second stage
8	Banfield	30	14	8	8	38	32	+6	50	2016 Copa Sudamericana second stage
9	River Plate	30	13	10	7	46	33	+13	49	2016 Copa Libertadores group stage
10	Tigre	30	12	10	8	32	25	+7	46	Advanced to Liguilla Pre-Sudamericana
11	Quilmes	30	13	6	11	38	37	+1	45	Advanced to Liguilla Pre-Sudamericana

Source: AFA
