= 2015 FIFA Club World Cup final =

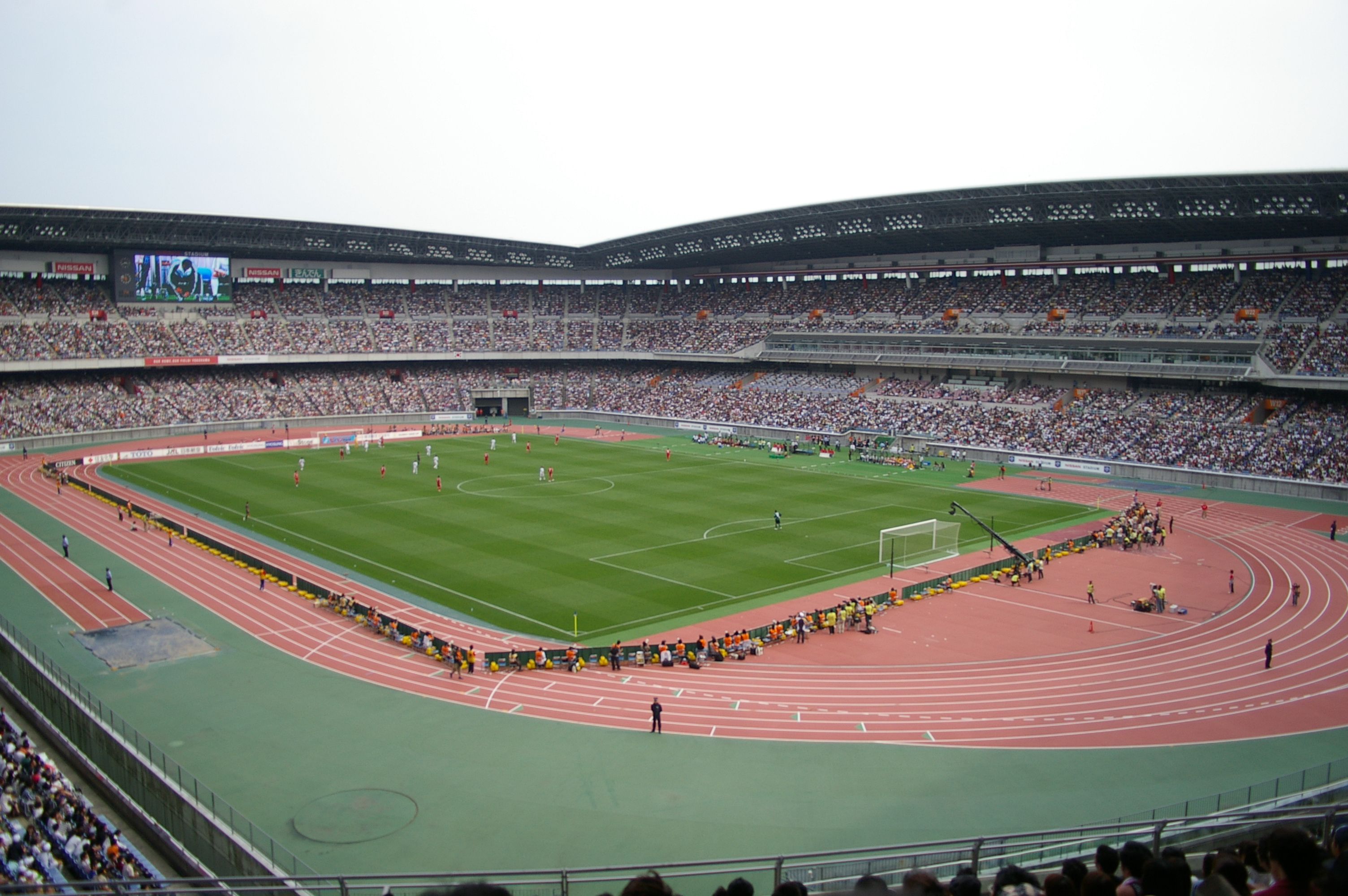
- The International Stadium staged the final
- Event: 2015 FIFA Club World Cup
River Plate	Barcelona
(Argentina)	(Spain)
0	3
- Date: 20 December 2015
- Venue: International Stadium Yokohama, Yokohama
- Man of the Match: Luis Suárez (Barcelona)
- Referee: Alireza Faghani (Iran)
- Attendance: 66,853
- Weather: Clear night 5 °C (41 °F); 76% humidity

The 2015 FIFA Club World Cup final was the final match of the 2015 FIFA Club World Cup, an association football tournament hosted by Japan. It was the 12th final of the FIFA Club World Cup, a FIFA-organised tournament between the winners of the six continental confederations as well as the host nation's league champions.

The final was contested between Argentine club River Plate, representing CONMEBOL as the reigning champions of the Copa Libertadores and Spanish club Barcelona, representing UEFA as the reigning champions of the UEFA Champions League. It was played at the International Stadium in Yokohama on 20 December 2015. Barcelona won the game 3–0 to claim their third FIFA Club World Cup title. The win for Barcelona was also their fifth trophy of 2015.

== Background ==
=== River Plate ===
River Plate qualified for the tournament as winners of the 2015 Copa Libertadores, following a 3–0 aggregate win against UANL in the final. This was River Plate's first time competing in the tournament. They have played two times in the Intercontinental Cup, the predecessor of the FIFA Club World Cup, with one win (1986) and one loss (1996). They reached the final after defeating Japanese club Sanfrecce Hiroshima in the semi-finals.

=== Barcelona ===
Barcelona qualified for the tournament as winners of the 2014–15 UEFA Champions League, following a 3–1 win against Juventus in the final. This was Barcelona's fourth time competing in the tournament, after winning twice in 2009 and 2011, as well as being runners-up in 2006. They have played one time in the Intercontinental Cup, with one loss (1992). They reached the final after defeating Chinese club Guangzhou Evergrande in the semi-finals.

== Route to the final ==
(Argentina) River Plate	Team	(Spain) Barcelona
CONMEBOL	Confederation	UEFA
Winners of the 2015 Copa Libertadores	Qualification	Winners of the 2014–15 UEFA Champions League
Bye	Play-off round	Bye
Bye	Quarter-finals	Bye
1–0 (Japan) Sanfrecce Hiroshima	Semi-finals	3–0 (China) Guangzhou Evergrande

== Match ==
=== Details ===
20 December 2015
19:30 JST

River Plate (Argentina)	0–3	(Spain) Barcelona
	Report	Messi 36'; Suárez 49', 68'

International Stadium Yokohama, Yokohama
Attendance: 66,853
Referee: Alireza Faghani (Iran)

River Plate	Barcelona

GK	1	(Argentina) Marcelo Barovero (c)
RB	25	(Argentina) Gabriel Mercado
CB	2	(Argentina) Jonatan Maidana
CB	3	(Colombia) Éder Álvarez Balanta
LB	21	(Argentina) Leonel Vangioni
RM	8	(Uruguay) Carlos Sánchez
DM	5	(Argentina) Matías Kranevitter	(yellow card) 10'
LM	23	(Argentina) Leonardo Ponzio	(yellow card) 32'	(substituted off) 46'
AM	19	(Uruguay) Tabaré Viudez		(substituted off) 56'
CF	7	(Uruguay) Rodrigo Mora		(substituted off) 46'
CF	13	(Argentina) Lucas Alario
Substitutes:
GK	12	(Argentina) Augusto Batalla
GK	26	(Argentina) Julio Chiarini
DF	6	(Argentina) Leandro Vega
DF	20	(Argentina) Milton Casco
DF	24	(Argentina) Emanuel Mammana
MF	10	(Argentina) Gonzalo Martínez		(substituted on) 46'
MF	16	(Argentina) Nicolás Bertolo
MF	18	(Uruguay) Camilo Mayada
MF	27	(Argentina) Lucho González		(substituted on) 46'
FW	11	(Argentina) Javier Saviola
FW	15	(Argentina) Leonardo Pisculichi
FW	22	(Argentina) Sebastián Driussi		(substituted on) 56'
Manager:
(Argentina) Marcelo Gallardo

GK	13	(Chile) Claudio Bravo
RB	6	(Brazil) Dani Alves
CB	3	(Spain) Gerard Piqué
CB	14	(Argentina) Javier Mascherano		(substituted off) 81'
LB	18	(Spain) Jordi Alba	(yellow card) 16'
RM	4	(Croatia) Ivan Rakitić	(yellow card) 43'	(substituted off) 67'
CM	5	(Spain) Sergio Busquets
LM	8	(Spain) Andrés Iniesta (c)
RF	10	(Argentina) Lionel Messi
CF	9	(Uruguay) Luis Suárez
LF	11	(Brazil) Neymar	(yellow card) 61'	(substituted off) 89'
Substitutes:
GK	1	(Germany) Marc-André ter Stegen
GK	25	(Spain) Jordi Masip
DF	15	(Spain) Marc Bartra
DF	21	(Brazil) Adriano
DF	23	(Belgium) Thomas Vermaelen		(substituted on) 81'
DF	24	(France) Jérémy Mathieu		(substituted on) 89'
MF	20	(Spain) Sergi Roberto	(yellow card) 72'	(substituted on) 67'
MF	26	(Spain) Sergi Samper
MF	28	(Spain) Gerard Gumbau
FW	17	(Spain) Munir
FW	19	(Spain) Sandro Ramírez
Manager:
(Spain) Luis Enrique

Man of the Match
Luis Suárez (Barcelona)

Assistant referees
Reza Sokhandan (Iran)
Mohammadreza Mansouri (Iran)
Fourth official
Sidi Alioum (Cameroon)

Match rules

- 90 minutes
- 30 minutes of extra time if necessary
- Penalty shoot-out if scores still level
- Twelve named substitutes, of which up to three may be used

=== Statistics ===
First half
Statistic	River Plate	Barcelona
Goals scored	0	1
Total shots	3	8
Shots on target	2	4
Saves	0	3
Ball possession	34%	66%
Corner kicks	2	1
Fouls committed	17	6
Offsides	0	1
Yellow cards	2	2
Red cards	0	0

Second half
Statistic	River Plate	Barcelona
Goals scored	0	2
Total shots	6	8
Shots on target	4	4
Saves	1	2
Ball possession	40%	60%
Corner kicks	4	1
Fouls committed	5	7
Offsides	1	1
Yellow cards	0	2
Red cards	0	0

Overall
Statistic	River Plate	Barcelona
Goals scored	0	3
Total shots	9	16
Shots on target	6	8
Saves	1	5
Ball possession	37%	63%
Corner kicks	6	2
Fouls committed	22	13
Offsides	1	2
Yellow cards	2	4
Red cards	0	0

== See also ==
- 2014–15 UEFA Champions League
- 2015 Copa Libertadores
- FC Barcelona in international football
