= 2014 Copa Sudamericana finals =

- Event: 2014 Copa Sudamericana
Atlético Nacional	River Plate
(Colombia)	(Argentina)
1	3
- on aggregate

First leg
Atlético Nacional	River Plate
1	1
- Date: 3 December 2014
- Venue: Estadio Atanasio Girardot, Medellín
- Referee: Ricardo Marques (Brazil)
- Attendance: 44,412

Second leg
River Plate	Atlético Nacional
2	0
- Date: 10 December 2014
- Venue: Estadio Monumental, Buenos Aires
- Referee: Darío Ubriaco (Uruguay)
- Attendance: 62,000

The 2014 Copa Sudamericana finals were the final matches of the 2014 Copa Sudamericana, South America's secondary club football competition. The two-legged event was contested between Atlético Nacional of Colombia and River Plate of Argentina. The first leg was played at the Estadio Atanasio Girardot, Medellín, on 3 December 2014 and the second leg was played on 10 December 2014 at the Estadio Monumental, Buenos Aires. Both teams were appearing in their second final.

As a team of the Argentine Zone, River Plate received a bye in the first round, which meant that Atlético Nacional played two matches more to reach the final. River Plate's first two rounds resulted in comfortable victories, with their later matches being more closely contested. In turn, all of Atlético Nacional's were hard fought contests, winning only a round by more than one goal.

A crowd of 44,412 observed the first leg at the Estadio Atanasio Girardot, in which Atlético Nacional opened the scoring following a Orlando Berrío goal. However, a long-range shot from Leonardo Pisculichi in the second half levelled the match at 1–1, which remained the score. Watched by a crowd of 62,000 at the Estadio Monumental, River Plate took an early lead in the second half when Gabriel Mercado scored. Four minutes later, Germán Pezzella extended their lead. River Plate held on to the 3–1 aggregate, winning the tie and securing their first Copa Sudamericana title.

== Road to the finals ==
=== Atlético Nacional ===
Atlético Nacional's route to the final
Round	Opposition	First leg	Second leg	Aggregate score
First stage	(Venezuela) Deportivo La Guaira	1–1 (a)	1–0 (h)	2–1
Second stage	(Paraguay) Club General Díaz	0–2 (h)	3–1 (a)	3–3 (a)
Round of 16	(Brazil) Vitória	2–2 (h)	1–0 (a)	3–2
Quarter-finals	(Peru) Universidad César Vallejo	1–0 (h)	1–0 (a)	2–0
Semi-finals	(Brazil) São Paulo	1–0 (h)	0–1 (a)	1–1 (4–1 p)

Atlético Nacional qualified for the Copa Sudamericana by winning the 2013 Copa Colombia, beating Millonarios 3–2 in the two-legged final. As a team of the North Zone, they entered the competition in the first stage, and would play against a team from their same zone. Thus, they were drawn against Deportivo La Guaira of Venezuela for their first match-up. The opening leg was held at the Estadio Olímpico de la UCV in Caracas, where the home side took the lead following a goal from Framber Villegas. Atlético Nacional would equalise the match eight minutes from the final whistle, when Edwin Cardona scored after they were awarded a penalty, remaining the score. The return leg at the Estadio Atanasio Girardot was won by the Colombian side, thanks to a goal from Luis Carlos Ruiz, which sent them through. They were now to face a team from the South Zone in the second stage, Paraguayan team Club General Díaz. The opening leg in Medellín went in favour of the visitors 2–0, which meant that Atlético Nacional needed to net at least two goals in the rematch. Cardona opened the scoring early at the Estadio Feliciano Cáceres, but the home side would tie the game on the second half. Shortly after, Wilder Guisao put the visitors in the lead once again, and Santiago Tréllez completed the comeback when he scored just three minutes away from stoppage time. Atlético Nacional advanced into the eighth-finals following a 3–3 aggregate, due to the away goals rule.

Their opposition in the Round of 16 were Vitória of Brasil. The first leg at the Estadio Atanasio Girardot resulted in a 2–2 draw. The return leg at the Estádio Manoel Barradas saw Atlético Nacional progress after Daniel Bocanegra scored the winning goal in the 70th minute. In the quarter-finals, they were paired against Peruvian team Universidad César Vallejo. The opening leg ended 1–0 to the home side courtesy of a goal from Alejandro Bernal. The rematch went in their favour as well, after Cardona found the net twelve minutes away from injury time. For their semi-final match-up, they were to face Brazilian team São Paulo. Atlético Nacional earned another 1–0 victory at their home ground, as Ruíz scored for the third time in the competition. São Paulo would match their opponents' efforts in the second leg, winning by the same margin at the Estádio do Morumbi. Thus, a penalty shoot-out was required to determine a winner. The home side missed two of their three spot kicks, sending Atlético Nacional through as they in turn scored all of their four penalties.

=== River Plate ===
River Plate's route to the final
Round	Opposition	First leg	Second leg	Aggregate score
First stage	Bye	—	—	—
Second stage	(Argentina) Godoy Cruz	1–0 (a)	2–0 (h)	3–0
Round of 16	(Paraguay) Club Libertad	3–1 (a)	2–0 (h)	5–1
Quarter-finals	(Argentina) Estudiantes de La Plata	2–1 (a)	3–2 (h)	5–3
Semi-finals	(Argentina) Boca Juniors	0–0 (a)	1–0 (h)	1–0

River Plate qualified for the Copa Sudamericana as champions of the 2014 Copa Campeonato, which they won against San Lorenzo 1–0. As a team of the Argentine Zone, they would play a fellow Argentine team, receiving a bye in the first round and thus entering the competition in the second stage. The draw determined they would play Godoy Cruz. The first leg was held at the Estadio Malvinas Argentinas, where River Plate won 1–0 after Germán Pezzella scored through a header in stoppage time. The return leg at the Estadio Monumental would also go in their favour, following a brace from Rodrigo Mora in the first half.

Their Round of 16 opponents were to be Club Libertad of Paraguay. At the Estadio Dr. Nicolás Léoz, a goal from Claudio Vargas put the visitors at a disadvantage. This was further emphasized when a penalty was awarded to the home team, which Hernán Rodrigo López missed. Despite this, River Plate made the comeback, as they scored three goals courtesy of Carlos Sánchez, Sebastián Driussi and Giovanni Simeone. They would later qualify after earning a 2–0 victory in the second leg. For the quarter-finals, they were to play another Argentine team in Estudiantes de La Plata. The opening leg was won by River Plate, who after facing another 1–0 deficit, secured a new comeback following a Mora strike and an own goal by Jonathan Schunke. An early goal at the Estadio Monumental by Teófilo Gutiérrez put the home side on the lead, but Estudiantes responded through forwards Diego Vera and Guido Carrillo, tying up the aggregate. Nonetheless, a pair of goals in the span of two minutes for River Plate sealed the 3–2 win as they progressed into the semi-finals. Their last opposition before the finals were to be rivals Boca Juniors. The first leg at the Estadio La Bombonera ended goalless. At the Estadio Monumental, the visitors were given a penalty seconds after the first whistle, following a foul Ariel Rojas committed on Marcelo Meli inside the area. Emmanuel Gigliotti stepped up to take the spot kick, but goalkeeper Marcelo Barovero saved it. Leonardo Pisculichi would score minutes later for the home side, who clinched a 1–0 victory to reach their second Copa Sudamericana final.

== Background ==
Atlético Nacional were appearing in their second Copa Sudamericana final. Their previous appearance in the 2002 edition resulted in a 4–0 loss on aggregate to San Lorenzo of Argentina. They were looking to win their first continental title in 14 years, after they beat fellow Colombian team Millonarios 2–1 in the year 2000 to win the two-legged Copa Merconorte final.

River Plate were also appearing in their second final. They had previously reached the 2003 Copa Sudamericana finals, which they lost to Cienciano of Peru 4–3 on aggregate. They were looking for their first continental title since 1997, when they beat Brazilian team São Paulo over two legs to win the 1997 Supercopa Libertadores finals.

Both teams were their league reigning champions at the time of the matches. River Plate had won the 2014 Torneo Final. Atlético Nacional were the 2014 Torneo Apertura winners, the third consecutive Categoría Primera A title they had won.

== First leg ==
=== Summary ===
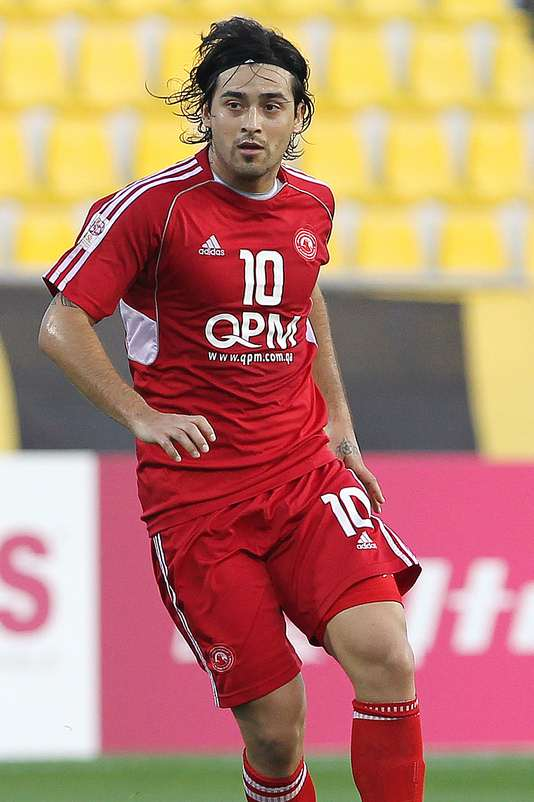
Leonardo Pisculichi scored for River Plate to tie the game.

The first leg was held at the Estadio Atanasio Girardot, the home ground of Atlético Nacional. The home side dominated the early stages of the game, as they pinned River Plate back and managed to create the best chances. Just five minutes in, attacking midfielder Edwin Cardona shot on target from a free kick, forcing Marcelo Barovero into a save. The goalkeeper fumbled to catch the ball, however, having the post prevent the opening goal. Four minutes later, left winger Jonathan Copete crossed for Luis Carlos Ruiz, but the striker was unable to connect. Atlético Nacional continued to have opportunities through Daniel Bocanegra and Copete, but none came to fruition. Meanwhile, River Plate struggled to control possession, and were unable to make the most of their counter-attacking chances. Nonetheless, they would have their first clear scoring prospect at the 31-minute mark, when a far-post shot from left-back Leonel Vangioni went narrowly wide of the goal. Striker Teófilo Gutiérrez attempted to redirect his teammate's shot for the net, but was unsuccessful. Shortly after, Cardona filtered a deep pass looking for Orlando Berrío. The winger ran down the right flank and unleashed a powerful shot to leave Barovero responseless and put his team ahead. Atlético Nacional made their first substitution a minute later, when Alejandro Guerra replaced injured midfielder Alejandro Bernal. The home side had two more opportunities to extend their lead before the interval. In the 38th minute of play, Barovero denied another effort from Berrío after he broke down his flank once again. Three minutes later, Copete received the ball on the left side, but he was unable to control it and the goalkeeper got ahold of it.

Early in the second half, River Plate had two chances at an equaliser. Just a minute from the restart, Gutiérrez sent a cross over to Carlos Sánchez, who slipped into the box and managed a left-footed shot which Franco Armani caught. Minutes later, a Leonardo Pisculichi free kick forced the goalkeeper to dive for a save. The visitors pushed their lines forward, looking to exert pressure and gain possession. In contrast, Atlético Nacional seemed in a tired state, stemming from the intensity they displayed earlier in the match. As the home side lacked ball control, manager Juan Carlos Osorio subbed off Copete for Sebastián Pérez. The change almost yielded them a second goal in the 62nd minute, after Berrío crossed for the midfielder, who rattled the crossbar with a header. Nonetheless, the visitors would tie the game three minutes later, when Pisculichi received a Gutiérrez pass and took a shot from afar that beat Armani, making it 1–1. Following the goal, both teams had chances to unlevel the score through set pieces. At the 69-minute mark, Atlético Nacional nearly retook the lead off a corner. River Plate replied with a Pisculichi free kick, which was sent over to Ramiro Funes Mori, whose effort was also barely off the mark. Content with the result, coach Marcelo Gallardo set in motion a 4–4–2 formation when he switched Pisculichi for Matías Kranevitter. Their aim was to hold on to the draw, while being able to exploit any counter-attacking opportunities that arose. They came close to a victory through a volley from subbed-in forward Fernando Cavenaghi, but his shot went over the woodwork, and the score remained.

=== Details ===
3 December 2014
19:15 UTC−5

Atlético Nacional (Colombia)	1–1	(Argentina) River Plate
Berrío 34'	Report	Pisculichi 65'

Estadio Atanasio Girardot, Medellín
Attendance: 44,412
Referee: Ricardo Marques (Brazil)

Atlético Nacional	River Plate

GK	30	(Argentina) Franco Armani
CB	22	(Colombia) Daniel Bocanegra
CB	12	(Colombia) Alexis Henríquez
CB	3	(Colombia) Óscar Murillo
CM	13	(Colombia) Alexander Mejía (c)
CM	20	(Colombia) Alejandro Bernal	(substituted off) 37'
CM	19	(Colombia) Farid Díaz
AM	10	(Colombia) Edwin Cardona
RW	17	(Colombia) Orlando Berrío	(substituted off) 70'
CF	14	(Colombia) Luis Carlos Ruiz
LW	29	(Colombia) Jonathan Copete	(substituted off) 58'
Substitutes:
GK	25	(Colombia) Luis Enrique Martínez
DF	6	(Colombia) Juan Valencia
MF	26	(Venezuela) Alejandro Guerra	(substituted on) 37'
MF	24	(Colombia) Sebastián Pérez	(substituted on) 58'
MF	7	(Colombia) Sherman Cárdenas
FW	18	(Colombia) Wilder Guisao	(substituted on) 70'
FW	9	(Colombia) Juan Pablo Ángel
Manager:
(Colombia) Juan Carlos Osorio

GK	1	(Argentina) Marcelo Barovero (c)
RB	24	(Argentina) Emanuel Mammana		(substituted off) 60'
CB	20	(Argentina) Germán Pezzella	(yellow card) 77'
CB	6	(Argentina) Ramiro Funes Mori
LB	21	(Argentina) Leonel Vangioni
RM	8	(Uruguay) Carlos Sánchez
DM	23	(Argentina) Leonardo Ponzio
LM	16	(Argentina) Ariel Rojas
AM	15	(Argentina) Leonardo Pisculichi		(substituted off) 75'
CF	7	(Uruguay) Rodrigo Mora		(substituted off) 66'
CF	19	(Colombia) Teófilo Gutiérrez	(yellow card) 86'
Substitutes:
GK	26	(Argentina) Julio Chiarini
DF	2	(Argentina) Jonathan Maidana
MF	5	(Argentina) Matías Kranevitter		(substituted on) 75'
MF	11	(Argentina) Osmar Ferreyra
MF	14	(Argentina) Augusto Solari		(substituted on) 60'
FW	18	(Argentina) Fernando Cavenaghi		(substituted on) 66'
FW	22	(Argentina) Sebastián Driussi
Manager:
(Argentina) Marcelo Gallardo

Assistant referees
Emerson de Carvalho (Brazil)
Marcelo Van Gasse (Brazil)
Fourth official
Wilton Sampaio (Brazil)

Match rules

- 90 minutes
- Seven named substitutes, of which up to three may be used

== Second leg ==
=== Summary ===
At the Estadio Monumental, the first minutes of the game unfolded tensely, with numerous fouls. Atlético Nacional's Juan Carlos Osorio arranged a 3–4–1–2 formation, looking to create pressure. In turn, the home side started to assert their dominance by issuing an early warning, following a free kick from Leonardo Pisculichi that Franco Armani successfully plunged away. Edwin Cardona responded for the visitors with a set piece of his own, sending the ball over the bar in the seventh minute. Shortly after, River Plate replicated the same play from earlier, as another free kick was cleared away by the Armani. The rebound fell to Carlos Sánchez, who forced the goalkeeper into a save with a volley. At the 11-minute mark, Leonel Vangioni crossed for Teófilo Gutiérrez after a one-two passing play with Rodrigo Mora. The Colombian striker connected, but his header went high. Four minutes later, Armani was tested once again when Sánchez found Gutiérrez, who attempted a far post shot to which the keeper responded well. River Plate continued to be in control of the match, having three further chances in the span of four minutes which they were unable to convert. In the 27th minute, a header from Gutiérrez was saved by Armani following a delivery from Mora. At the half-hour mark, Pisculichi filtered a pass for the Colombian striker, who eludded his marker Francisco Nájera and unveiled a weak effort that was also denied. Just a minute later, he entered the penalty area and took another shot which was stopped for a third time by the Argentine goalkeeper.

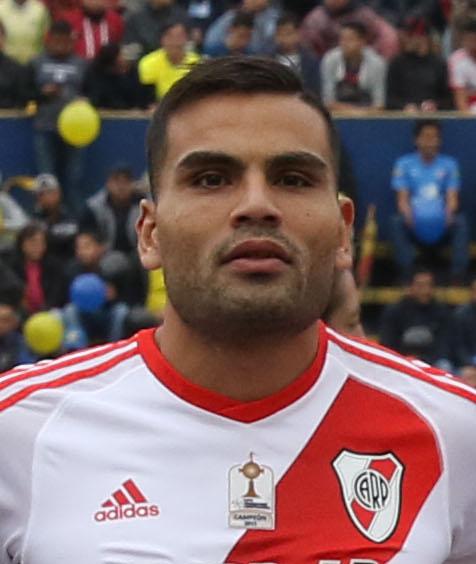
Gabriel Mercado scored the opening goal of the match.

Atlético Nacional's gameplan was to permanently look for Alexander Mejía or Cardona, who were to dictate their plays. Their teammates were mostly unable to find them, however, which prompted their opposition to rapidly retake ball control. They eventually managed to fend off the River Plate high pressure, and created an opportunity in the 32nd minute when Luis Carlos Ruiz shot just wide from outside the box. The forward later followed up on this breakthrough by sending a dangerous cross that Marcelo Barovero barely managed to intercept. The visitors linked up a third consecutive prospect when Orlando Berrío laid off a pass to Cardona, who found himself in front of Barovero and took a shot that the goalkeeper deflected for a corner. Nonetheless, the last chance of the half fell to the home side. After a defensive clearance, Mora got rid of his marker and set Gutiérrez up one-on-one with Armani. However, the Colombian striker lingered to take control of the ball, and ultimately squandered the opportunity.

Atlético Nacional had the first approach in the second half with a free kick that Juan Valencia sent into Barovero. River Plate had a quiet start, but would take the lead 55 minutes in. Pisculichi took a corner kick from the left that progressively curled away from the goalkeeper. The delivery found right-back Gabriel Mercado, who with a bounced header put his team ahead. Five minutes later, they repeated the same play to score their second goal. The cross sent by the attacking midfielder was headed by centre-back Germán Pezzella to make it 2–0. From there on out, the visitors were unable to funnel any further danger. River Plate had another chance to extend their lead in the 77th minute, following a Pisculichi set piece which almost resulted in an own goal. Nonetheless, their advatange would remain as they calmly saw the match off to win their first Copa Sudamericana.

=== Details ===
10 December 2014
21:15 UTC−3

River Plate (Argentina)	2–0	(Colombia) Atlético Nacional
Mercado 54'; Pezzella 58'	Report

Estadio Monumental, Buenos Aires
Attendance: 62,000
Referee: Darío Ubriaco (Uruguay)

River Plate	Atlético Nacional

GK	1	(Argentina) Marcelo Barovero (c)
RB	25	(Argentina) Gabriel Mercado
CB	20	(Argentina) Germán Pezzella
CB	6	(Argentina) Ramiro Funes Mori	(yellow card) 48'
LB	21	(Argentina) Leonel Vangioni
RM	8	(Uruguay) Carlos Sánchez
DM	23	(Argentina) Leonardo Ponzio		(substituted off) 81'
LM	16	(Argentina) Ariel Rojas
AM	15	(Argentina) Leonardo Pisculichi		(substituted off) 89'
CF	7	(Uruguay) Rodrigo Mora
CF	19	(Colombia) Teófilo Gutiérrez		(substituted off) 79'
Substitutes:
GK	26	(Argentina) Julio Chiarini
DF	24	(Argentina) Emanuel Mammana
MF	5	(Argentina) Matías Kranevitter		(substituted on) 81'
MF	11	(Argentina) Osmar Ferreyra
MF	14	(Argentina) Augusto Solari
FW	22	(Argentina) Sebastián Driussi		(substituted on) 89'
FW	18	(Argentina) Fernando Cavenaghi		(substituted on) 79'
Manager:
(Argentina) Marcelo Gallardo

GK	30	(Argentina) Franco Armani
CB	5	(Colombia) Francisco Nájera		(substituted off) 64'
CB	12	(Colombia) Alexis Henríquez
CB	6	(Colombia) Juan Valencia
RM	22	(Colombia) Daniel Bocanegra
CM	20	(Colombia) Alejandro Bernal
CM	13	(Colombia) Alexander Mejía (c)	(yellow card) 83'
LM	19	(Colombia) Farid Díaz		(substituted off) 65'
AM	10	(Colombia) Edwin Cardona
CF	17	(Colombia) Orlando Berrío	(yellow card) 68'	(substituted off) 72'
CF	14	(Colombia) Luis Carlos Ruiz
Substitutes:
GK	25	(Colombia) Luis Enrique Martínez
DF	3	(Colombia) Óscar Murillo		(substituted on) 64'
MF	24	(Colombia) Sebastián Pérez
MF	7	(Colombia) Sherman Cárdenas		(substituted on) 72'
FW	18	(Colombia) Wilder Guisao		(substituted on) 65'
FW	29	(Colombia) Jonathan Copete
FW	9	(Colombia) Juan Pablo Ángel
Manager:
(Colombia) Juan Carlos Osorio

Assistant referees
Miguel A. Nievas (Uruguay)
Mauricio Espinosa (Uruguay)
Fourth official
Christian Ferreyra (Uruguay)

Match rules

- 90 minutes
- 30 minutes of extra time if necessary (away goals rule not applied)
- Penalty shoot-out if scores still level
- Seven named substitutes, of which up to three may be used

== See also ==
- 2014 Copa Libertadores finals
- 2015 Recopa Sudamericana
- 2015 Suruga Bank Championship
- 2014 Club Atlético River Plate season
- Atlético Nacional in international tournaments
