= 2015 Copa Libertadores finals =

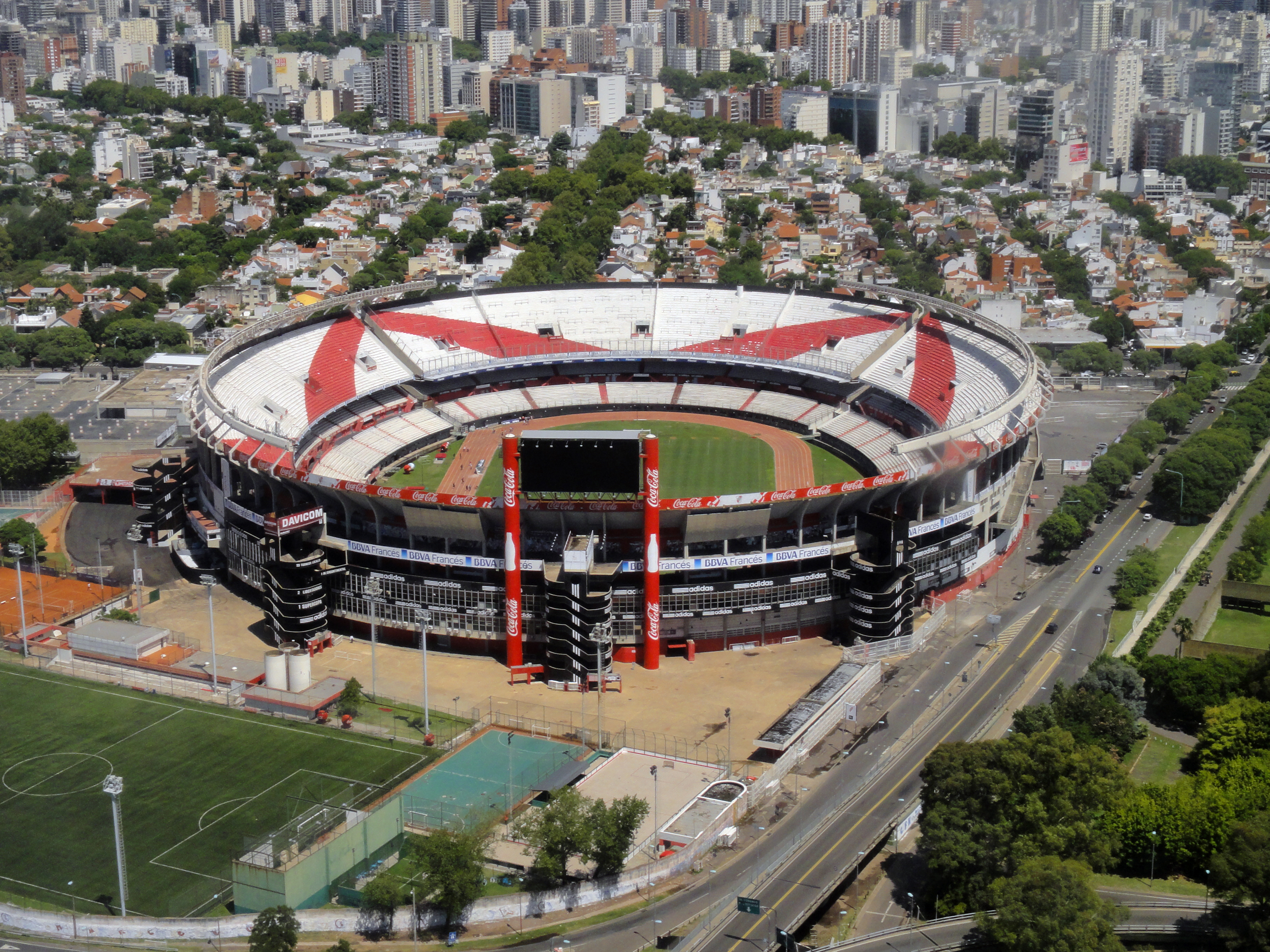
- Estadio Monumental in Buenos Aires hosted the second leg
- Event: 2015 Copa Libertadores
Tigres UANL	River Plate
(Mexico)	(Argentina)
0	3
- on aggregate

First leg
Tigres UANL	River Plate
0	0
- Date: 29 July 2015
- Venue: Estadio Universitario, San Nicolás de los Garza
- Referee: Antonio Arias (Paraguay)
- Attendance: 42,000

Second leg
River Plate	Tigres UANL
3	0
- Date: 5 August 2015
- Venue: Estadio Monumental, Buenos Aires
- Referee: Darío Ubriaco (Uruguay)
- Attendance: 62,000

The 2015 Copa Libertadores finals were the final matches of the 2015 Copa Libertadores, South America's primary club football competition. The two-legged event was contested between Tigres UANL of Mexico and River Plate of Argentina. The first leg was played at the Estadio Universitario, San Nicolás de los Garza, on 29 July 2015 and the second leg was played on 5 August 2015 at the Estadio Monumental, Buenos Aires. River Plate, who had won the competition two times, were appearing in their fifth final. Tigres were appearing in their first Copa Libertadores final.

Each club needed to progress through the group stage and knockout rounds to reach the final, playing 12 matches in total. Both finalists landed in the same group. Tigres topped the group and faced Universitario de Sucre, Emelec and Internacional before reaching the final. River Plate finished second and subsequently beat rivals Boca Juniors, Cruzeiro and Club Guaraní to progress to the final.

A crowd of 42,000 observed the first leg at the Estadio Universitario, which resulted in a goalless draw. Watched by a crowd of 62,000 at the Estadio Monumental, River Plate took the lead late in the first half when Lucas Alario scored. Carlos Sánchez extended their lead through a penalty in the second half, and Ramiro Funes Mori added one further four minutes later from a corner kick. Following a 3–0 scoreline, River Plate secured their third Copa Libertadores.

== Background ==
The match was River Plate's fifth final and their first appearance since the 1996 Copa Libertadores finals, which they had won 2–1 on aggregate against América de Cali of Colombia. They had previously lifted the trophy on two occasions in 1986 and 1996, and had also lost two times in 1966 and 1976. Tigres were appearing in their first Copa Libertadores final, the third Mexican team to reach one.

Both teams played their last matches before the first leg on 25 July. River Plate earned a 3–1 victory against Colón de Santa Fe midway through their domestic campaign in the Argentine Primera División. Tigres in turn had just started their run in the Torneo Apertura, having played only one game which ended in a 1–0 loss against Toluca.

== Route to the finals ==
The competition proper started with the second stage, contested as eight double round-robin groups of four teams, with the top two qualifying for the knockout stages. The knockout stage ties were decided based on home and away matches, and teams were seeded according to their performance in the group stage to determine which team would play the second leg at their home ground.

(Mexico) Tigres UANL				Round	(Argentina) River Plate			
Opponent	Result			Second stage	Opponent	Result		
(Peru) Juan Aurich	3–0 (H)			Matchday 1	(Bolivia) San José	0–2 (A)		
(Argentina) River Plate	1–1 (A)			Matchday 2	(Mexico) Tigres UANL	1–1 (H)		
(Bolivia) San José	1–0 (A)			Matchday 3	(Peru) Juan Aurich	1–1 (A)		
(Bolivia) San José	4–0 (H)			Matchday 4	(Peru) Juan Aurich	1–1 (H)		
(Argentina) River Plate	2–2 (H)			Matchday 5	(Mexico) Tigres UANL	2–2 (A)		
(Peru) Juan Aurich	5–4 (A)			Matchday 6	(Bolivia) San José	3–0 (H)		
Group 6 winner: Pos / Team / Pld / Pts; 1 / (Mexico) Tigres UANL / 6 / 14; 2 / (Argentina) River Plate / 6 / 7; 3 / (Peru) Juan Aurich / 6 / 6; 4 / (Bolivia) San José / 6 / 4; Source: CONMEBOL				Final standings	Group 6 runners-up: Pos / Team / Pld / Pts; 1 / (Mexico) Tigres UANL / 6 / 14; 2 / (Argentina) River Plate / 6 / 7; 3 / (Peru) Juan Aurich / 6 / 6; 4 / (Bolivia) San José / 6 / 4; Source: CONMEBOL			
Seed 2				Final stages	Seed 16			
Opponent	Agg.	1st leg	2nd leg	Final stages	Opponent	Agg.	1st leg	2nd leg
(Bolivia) Universitario de Sucre	3–2	2–1 (A)	1–1 (H)	Round of 16	(Argentina) Boca Juniors	1–0 (w/o)	1–0 (H)	0–0 (A) (Note: The match between Boca Juniors and River Plate on 14 May was abandoned after River Plate's squad was attacked with pepper spray by Boca Juniors fans when they were returning to the field following half-time. CONMEBOL opened disciplinary proceedings against the home team, subsequently disqualifying them from the tournament on 16 May 2015.)
(Ecuador) Emelec	2–1	0–1 (A)	2–0 (H)	Quarter-finals	(Brazil) Cruzeiro	3–1	0–1 (H)	3–0 (A)
(Brazil) Internacional	4–3	1–2 (A)	3–1 (H)	Semi-finals	(Paraguay) Club Guaraní	3–1	2–0 (H)	1–1 (A)

Tigres qualified for the Copa Libertadores by finishing in second place of the 2014 Apertura league table, being the best ranked team not qualified for the 2014–15 CONCACAF Champions League. River Plate entered the competition after winning the 2014 Torneo Final, while also being the reigning Copa Sudamericana champions. Therefore, both teams started their campaign in the second stage, and were drawn together in Group 6 alongside Juan Aurich of Peru and San José of Bolivia.

=== Tigres UANL ===
Tigres opened the group by winning 3–0 against Juan Aurich at their home ground of Estadio Universitario. They then drew their following game against River Plate, but proceeded to win their two fixtures against San José: they earned a 1–0 victory at the Estadio Jesús Bermúdez, and a resounding 4–0 rout at their home stadium. With ten points, Tigres stood in first position of Group 6, and would later qualify for the knockout stage after tying once again to River Plate. Having already won their group, they lined up mostly substitutes for their last matchday, in which they earned a 5–4 victory at the Estadio Elías Aguirre. Totalizing 14 points, they were the second-best placed team on the seedings.

Their opposition in the Round of 16 were Bolivian club Universitario de Sucre. The first leg at the Estadio Olímpico Patria finished 2–1 to Tigres. The return leg ended in a 1–1 draw, which sent them into the quarter-finals, where they faced Emelec of Ecuador. Tigres suffered a 1–0 defeat in their visit to the Estadio George Capwell, but pulled off a comeback after winning 2–0 at the Estadio Universitario. Thus, they were to play Internacional of Brasil in the semi-finals. They lost the opening leg 2–1 at the Estádio Beira-Rio, but managed another comeback at their home ground to progress into the finals.

=== River Plate ===
River Plate started their campaign with a 2–0 loss against San José. They then drew 1–1 in each of their next three fixtures, yielding only three of the 12 points in play. On their fifth matchday, two goals in the span of four minutes courtesy of Teófilo Gutiérrez and Rodrigo Mora allowed them to salvage a draw, after facing a 2–0 deficit that had left them on the brink of elimination. In order to advance into the knockout stage, River Plate needed a victory against San José, and had to count on Tigres not losing to Juan Aurich. Following their 3–0 win at the Estadio Monumental, and a Tigres victory in Peru, they reached the Round of 16. Earning only seven points, they were the lowest-ranked second-place team.

Their first knockout stage opponents were rivals Boca Juniors, the best-placed team on the seedings. The opening leg went in River Plate's favour 1–0. At La Bombonera, the first half ended scoreless, but the remaining 45 minutes were unable to be played, as River Plate's squad was attacked with pepper spray in the tunnel preceding their entrance into the pitch. The match was consequently abandoned and the away side progressed into the quarter-finals, where they faced Brazilian team Cruzeiro. In spite of a loss at their home ground, River Plate managed to qualify for the semi-finals, as they achieved a 3–0 comeback at the Mineirão. Thus, the last team standing on their way to the finals was Club Guaraní of Paraguay. At the Estadio Monumental, the Argentine side won 2–0. They followed up by drawing 1–1 at the Estadio Defensores del Chaco, result that sent them into their fifth Copa Libertadores final.

== First leg ==
=== Summary ===
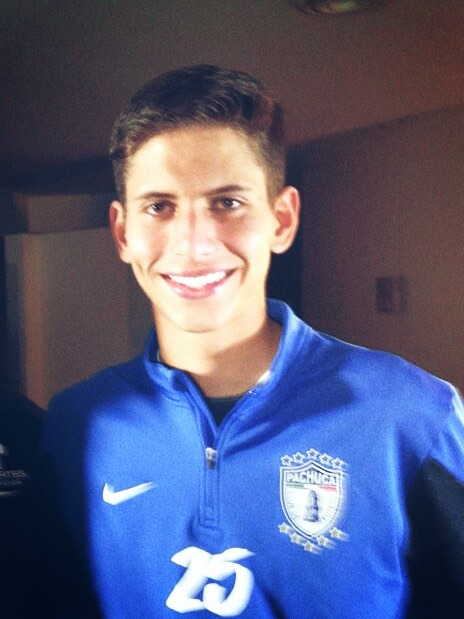
Jürgen Damm's efforts were unable to yield his team an advantage.

The first leg was held at the Estadio Universitario, the home ground of Tigres UANL. (Note: Regardless of their seeding, Tigres UANL were to host the opening leg of the final as stipulated by CONMEBOL regulations.) River Plate came out determined to take control of the first leg. They attempted to get to the opposing area, and had an early scoring prospect thanks to a free kick from Tabaré Viudez that goalkeeper Nahuel Guzmán barely managed to fend off. River Plate had a follow up chance at the 13-minute mark courtesy of another set piece, but right-back Gabriel Mercado was unable to muster a shot after a series of rebounds. Nonetheless, Tigres began to improve as they started to threaten their opposition. The home side looked to attack down the flanks through midfielders Jürgen Damm and Damián Álvarez, and eventually found ways to exploit the right side of the pitch, covered by Leonel Vangioni. In the 17th minute, a cross from Egidio Arévalo Ríos deflected off the River Plate full-back, rattling the crossbar. Tigres immediately replicated this play through Damm, who crossed for Rafael Sóbis. The unmarked striker met his delivery, but headed it into goalkeeper Marcelo Barovero. At the 35-minute mark, the visitors managed to respond. Jonatan Maidana anticipated a play in defence and laid it off to Carlos Sánchez, who then filtered a pass for Lucas Alario to run after. The striker tried to dribble his way past Guzmán, but the goalkeeper held him off and secured the ball. In the 41st minute, Tigres' centre-back Hugo Ayala limped off the field after sustaining an ankle injury. His replacement was fellow defender Jose Rivas. Moments later, a foul committed by Mercado on André-Pierre Gignac ruled the full-back out of the second leg, product of an accumulation of cards.

During half-time, River Plate manager Marcelo Gallardo subbed in Nicolás Bertolo and Gonzalo Martínez for Uruguayan pair Viudez and Rodrigo Mora, who were both suffering from muscle strains. The changes implied a rearrangement of the attacking line, as he set in motion a 4–2–3–1 formation, with Alario as the lone striker. After the restart, the visitors were able to funnel danger through Bertolo, but they eventually succumbed to the Tigres pressure. The home side managed to pin River Plate back through combinations in the midfield, but lacked the final touch near the edge of the box, which mostly relied on Gignac, who was neutralized by the centre-back tandem of Maidana and Ramiro Funes Mori. Gallardo was sent off in the 73rd minute for yelling at the fourth official. During the last 15 minutes, River Plate's Barovero was instrumental in helping his team secure the draw. The goalkeeper first dived low to save Juninho's long-range free kick. He then proceeded to hold Damm off, following a one-on-one situation in which the midfielder tried to dribble past him.

=== Details ===
29 July 2015
20:00 UTC−5

Tigres UANL (Mexico)	0–0	(Argentina) River Plate
	Report

Estadio Universitario, San Nicolás de los Garza
Attendance: 42,000
Referee: Antonio Arias (Paraguay)

Tigres UANL	River Plate

GK	1	(Argentina) Nahuel Guzmán
RB	2	(Mexico) Israel Jiménez
CB	4	(Mexico) Hugo Ayala		(substituted off) 41'
CB	3	(Brazil) Juninho (c)
LB	6	(Mexico) Jorge Torres Nilo
RM	27	(Mexico) Jürgen Damm	(yellow card) 54'
CM	19	(Argentina) Guido Pizarro
CM	5	(Uruguay) Egidio Arévalo Ríos		(substituted off) 70'
LM	11	(Mexico) Damián Álvarez
CF	9	(Brazil) Rafael Sóbis	(yellow card) 32'
CF	10	(France) André-Pierre Gignac
Substitutes:
GK	22	(Mexico) Enrique Palos
DF	14	(Mexico) Iván Estrada
DF	24	(Mexico) José Rivas		(substituted on) 41'
MF	18	(United States) José Francisco Torres
MF	23	(Mexico) Gerardo Lugo
MF	29	(Mexico) Jesús Dueñas		(substituted on) 70'
FW	16	(Mexico) Enrique Esqueda
Manager:
(Brazil) Ricardo Ferretti

GK	1	(Argentina) Marcelo Barovero (c)
RB	25	(Argentina) Gabriel Mercado	(yellow card) 42'
CB	2	(Argentina) Jonathan Maidana
CB	6	(Argentina) Ramiro Funes Mori
LB	21	(Argentina) Leonel Vangioni	(yellow card) 4'
RM	8	(Uruguay) Carlos Sánchez
CM	23	(Argentina) Leonardo Ponzio	(yellow card) 64'	(substituted off) 76'
CM	5	(Argentina) Matías Kranevitter
LM	19	(Uruguay) Tabaré Viúdez		(substituted off) 46'
CF	7	(Uruguay) Rodrigo Mora		(substituted off) 46'
CF	13	(Argentina) Lucas Alario
Substitutes:
GK	26	(Argentina) Julio Chiarini
DF	3	(Colombia) Éder Álvarez Balanta
MF	10	(Argentina) Gonzalo Martínez		(substituted on) 46'
MF	16	(Argentina) Nicolás Bertolo		(substituted on) 46'
MF	27	(Argentina) Lucho González		(substituted on) 76'
FW	9	(Argentina) Fernando Cavenaghi
FW	29	(Argentina) Javier Saviola
Manager:
(Argentina) Marcelo Gallardo				(red card) 73'

Assistant referees
Eduardo Cardozo (Paraguay)
Juan Zorrilla (Paraguay)
Fourth official
Julio Quintana (Paraguay)

Match rules

- 90 minutes
- Seven named substitutes, of which up to three may be used

== Second leg ==
=== Summary ===
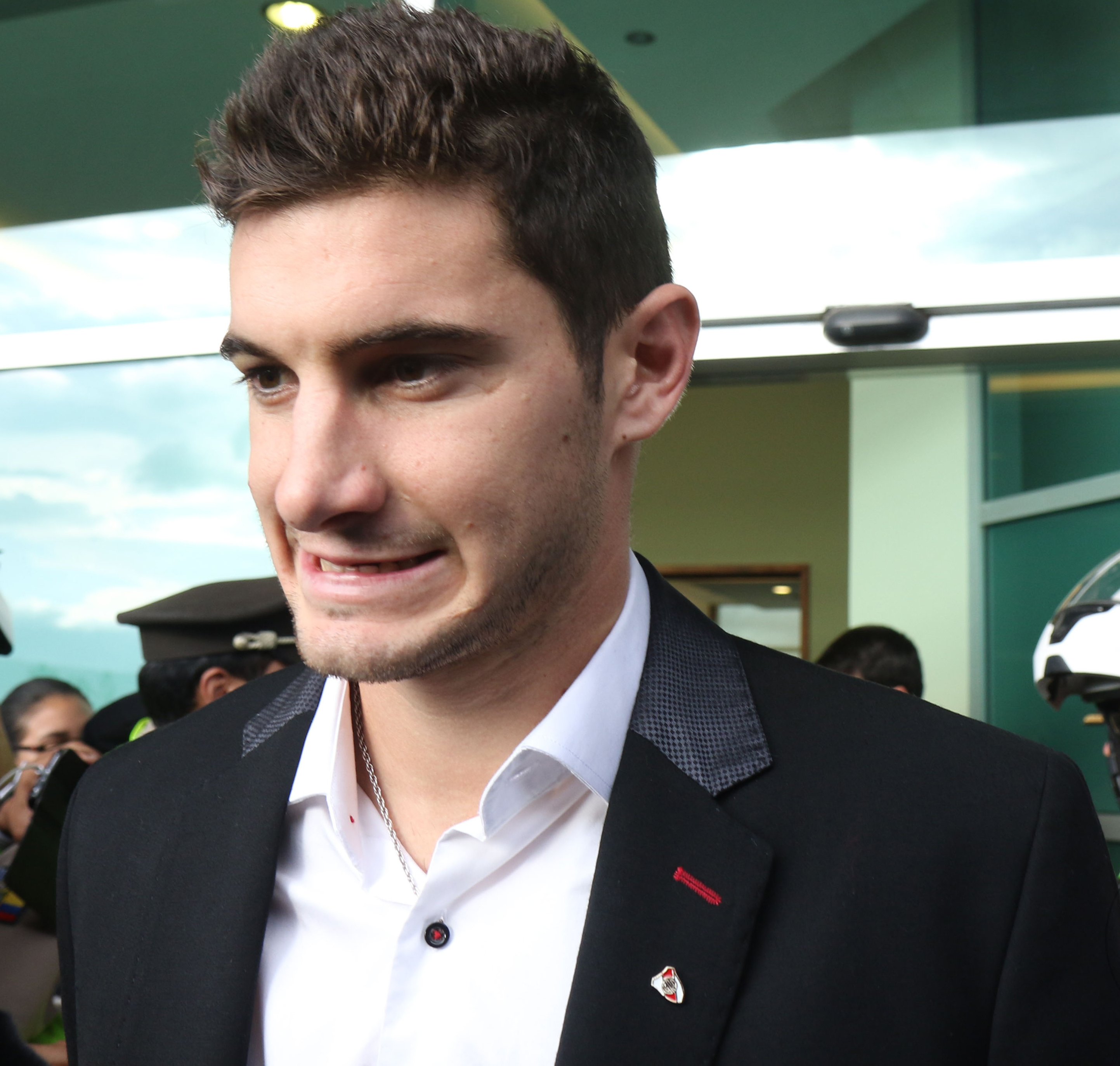
Lucas Alario opened the scoring late in the first half.

At the Estadio Monumental, River Plate came out determined to impose their presence once again. They controlled the midfield and orchestrated plays down the right flank through Carlos Sánchez and Camilo Mayada, who made several overlapping runs. The first half was marred by fouls. Referee Darío Ubriaco handed a yellow card to Lucas Alario early on, stemming from a reckless challenge that could have been judged as a straight red. Four Tigres players were also booked in just 25 minutes of play. The visitors had one of the clearest chances when André-Pierre Gignac set Rafael Sóbis up one-on-one with Marcelo Barovero. His inability to control the ball, however, squandered the opportunity. In the 24th minute, a run by Jürgen Damm was also fruitless after he cut inside and laid the ball off to Gignac, who was unable to shoot on target from inside the box. A possible penalty was missed by Ubriaco following a handball by José Rivas while jousting with Alario. The half seemed to end goalless until Leonel Vangioni, at the 44-minute mark, turned around on his marker and ran towards the Tigres defence before crossing for Alario, who unveiled a low header to the near post of Nahuel Guzmán to open the scoring.

During the second half, the home side ceded possession to the visitors and dropped back on defence. Ramiro Funes Mori was tasked with anticipating the attackers, while Matías Kranevitter was instructed to create a defensive triangle along with the centre-backs, looking for numerical advantage. The strategy was a success, as dominance by Tigres extended no further than into the final third. Nonetheless, Damm managed to elaborate another play down the right, which he followed up by sending a cross over to Javier Aquino, who headed the ball over the bar. Shortly after, Uruguayan midfielder Sánchez was brought down by Aquino inside the area. Match official Ubriaco awarded the penalty, which he took himself, firing into the roof of the net. At the 77-minute mark, River Plate's Matías Biscay switched striker Fernando Cavenaghi for Leonardo Pisculichi. Just over a minute later, the subbed attacking midfielder found Funes Mori after he sent a cross from a corner kick. The centre-back headed the ball past Guzmán to seal the 3–0 scoreline.

=== Details ===
5 August 2015
22:00 UTC−3

River Plate (Argentina)	3–0	(Mexico) Tigres UANL
Alario 45'; Sánchez 75' (pen.); Funes Mori 79'	Report

Estadio Monumental, Buenos Aires
Attendance: 62,000
Referee: Darío Ubriaco (Uruguay)

River Plate	Tigres UANL

GK	1	(Argentina) Marcelo Barovero
RB	18	(Uruguay) Camilo Mayada
CB	2	(Argentina) Jonathan Maidana
CB	6	(Argentina) Ramiro Funes Mori	(yellow card) 47'
LB	21	(Argentina) Leonel Vangioni
RM	8	(Uruguay) Carlos Sánchez	(yellow card) 76'
CM	23	(Argentina) Leonardo Ponzio
CM	5	(Argentina) Matías Kranevitter		(substituted off) 82'
LM	16	(Argentina) Nicolás Bertolo
CF	13	(Argentina) Lucas Alario	(yellow card) 9'	(substituted off) 69'
CF	9	(Argentina) Fernando Cavenaghi (c)	(yellow card) 56'	(substituted off) 77'
Substitutes:
GK	26	(Argentina) Julio Chiarini
DF	3	(Colombia) Éder Álvarez Balanta
MF	10	(Argentina) Gonzalo Martínez
MF	15	(Argentina) Leonardo Pisculichi		(substituted on) 77'
MF	27	(Argentina) Lucho González		(substituted on) 82'
FW	22	(Argentina) Sebastián Driussi		(substituted on) 69'
FW	29	(Argentina) Javier Saviola
Manager:
(Argentina) Matías Biscay (Note: Matías Biscay stepped in as head coach of River Plate, replacing Marcelo Gallardo who had been sent off in the first leg.)

GK	1	(Argentina) Nahuel Guzmán
RB	2	(Mexico) Israel Jiménez	(yellow card) 17'	(substituted off) 77'
CB	24	(Mexico) José Rivas	(yellow card) 25'
CB	3	(Brazil) Juninho (c)	(yellow card) 19'
LB	6	(Mexico) Jorge Torres Nilo	(yellow card) 72'
RM	27	(Mexico) Jürgen Damm
CM	19	(Argentina) Guido Pizarro
CM	5	(Uruguay) Egidio Arévalo Ríos		(substituted off) 64'
LM	20	(Mexico) Javier Aquino
CF	10	(France) André-Pierre Gignac	(yellow card) 22'
CF	9	(Brazil) Rafael Sóbis
Substitutes:
GK	22	(Mexico) Enrique Palos
DF	25	(Mexico) Antonio Briseño
MF	11	(Mexico) Damián Álvarez
MF	15	(Mexico) Manuel Viniegra
MF	18	(United States) José Francisco Torres
MF	29	(Mexico) Jesús Dueñas		(substituted on) 64'
FW	8	(Ecuador) Joffre Guerrón		(substituted on) 77'
Manager:
(Brazil) Ricardo Ferretti

Assistant referees
Mauricio Espinosa (Uruguay)
Nicolas Taran (Uruguay)
Fourth official
Andrés Cunha (Uruguay)

Match rules

- 90 minutes
- 30 minutes of extra time if necessary (away goals rule not applied)
- Penalty shoot-out if scores still level
- Seven named substitutes, of which up to three may be used

== Post-match ==
River Plate forward Lucas Alario arrived to the squad in July 2015 after being transferred from Colón de Santa Fe. At the time of the matches, he had already contributed with one goal and two assists in the semi-final matchup against Club Guaraní. When asked about scoring the opening goal of the final days later, he stated: "I felt an immense sense of joy — it was a wonderful feeling. The best part is that we achieved our goal of winning the Copa Libertadores. I'm living a very unique moment in my life."

Marcelo Gallardo was unable to coach his team in the second leg, a task for which assistant manager Matías Biscay stepped up. Nonetheless, he became the first River Plate manager to have also won the thropy as a footballer. After the match ended, he stepped onto the pitch and expressed: "It was very difficult to imagine all of this a year ago, when we arrived. This is a very emotional moment to experience. We made a huge effort dedicating ourselves to achieving it. We deserved it."

Looking back years later, Tigres' Egidio Arévalo Ríos admitted: "We lacked attitude [...] We entered the field about 10 or 15 minutes before kick-off, and most of our players were mesmerized by the atmosphere." He added: "Very few of us were worried about what was going to happen on the field."

Following the win, River Plate became the holders of the three South American club competitions, as they had won the Copa Sudamericana on 10 December 2014 and the Recopa Sudamericana on 11 February. They also qualified for the 2016 Copa Libertadores, despite finishing ninth in the 2015 Primera División. The win also earned River Plate a qualification to the 2015 FIFA Club World Cup. During their domestic 2015–16 season, Tigres won the Torneo Apertura. They were unable to participate in that season's Copa Libertadores, however, as they had entered the 2015–16 CONCACAF Champions League.

== See also ==
- 2015 Copa Sudamericana finals
- 2016 Recopa Sudamericana
- 2015 Club Atlético River Plate season
- 2015–16 Tigres UANL season
- Tigres UANL in international football
