= 2015 Recopa Sudamericana =

- Event: Recopa Sudamericana
River Plate	San Lorenzo
(Argentina)	(Argentina)
2	0
- on aggregate

First leg
River Plate	San Lorenzo
1	0
- Date: 6 February 2015
- Venue: Estadio Monumental, Buenos Aires
- Referee: Germán Delfino (Argentina)
- Attendance: 64,000

Second leg
San Lorenzo	River Plate
0	1
- Date: 11 February 2015
- Venue: Estadio Nuevo Gasómetro, Buenos Aires
- Referee: Néstor Pitana (Argentina)
- Attendance: 40,000

The 2015 Recopa Sudamericana was a football match played over two legs between San Lorenzo and River Plate of Argentina. The first leg was played at the Estadio Monumental, Buenos Aires on 6 February 2015 and the second leg was played on 11 February 2015 at the Estadio Nuevo Gasómetro. The annual Recopa Sudamericana, it was contested between the winners of the Copa Libertadores and Copa Sudamericana. San Lorenzo were appearing in the competition for the second time after their loss in the 2003 edition, while River Plate reappeared for their third time after back-to-back losses in 1997 and 1998.

The teams qualified for the competition by winning the Copa Libertadores and Copa Sudamericana. River Plate won the 2014 Copa Sudamericana beating Colombian team Atlético Nacional 3–1 in the finals. San Lorenzo qualified by winning the 2014 Copa Libertadores. They beat Paraguayan team Club Nacional 2–1 in the finals.

In front of a crowd of 64,000 at the Estadio Monumental, River Plate won the first leg 1-0 through a late second-half goal from Carlos Sánchez. Sánchez scored again in the second leg at the Estadio Nuevo Gasómetro, attended by 40,000, giving River Plate another 1–0 win and a 2–0 victory on aggregate to claim their first Recopa Sudamericana title.

== Background ==
The Recopa Sudamericana was founded in 1989 to determine the best team in South America. From 1989 to 1998, it was contested between the winners of the Copa Libertadores and the Supercopa Libertadores, until CONMEBOL discontinued the latter. The competition then entered a four-year hiatus, resuming with the introduction of another major secondary tournament, the Copa Sudamericana.

River Plate qualified for the match by winning the 2014 Copa Sudamericana, defeating Colombian team Atlético Nacional 3–1 on aggregate in the finals. It was the club's first title in the competition, having finished as runners-up in 2003. They were appearing in the Recopa Sudamericana for the third time after previous losses in 1997 and 1998.

San Lorenzo qualified for the competition by winning the 2014 Copa Libertadores, defeating Paraguayan team Club Nacional 2–1 on aggregate in the finals for their first title in the tournament. It was the club's second appearance in the Recopa Sudamericana, after a defeat in the 2003 edition.

The first leg of the Recopa Sudamericana was scheduled to be the first official match of the season for both clubs. San Lorenzo's last match beforehand was a 1–0 pre-season friendly win over Godoy Cruz, while River Plate's was a 5–0 defeat to rivals Boca Juniors in the exhibition cup Copa Luis B. Nofal.

== First leg ==
=== Summary ===
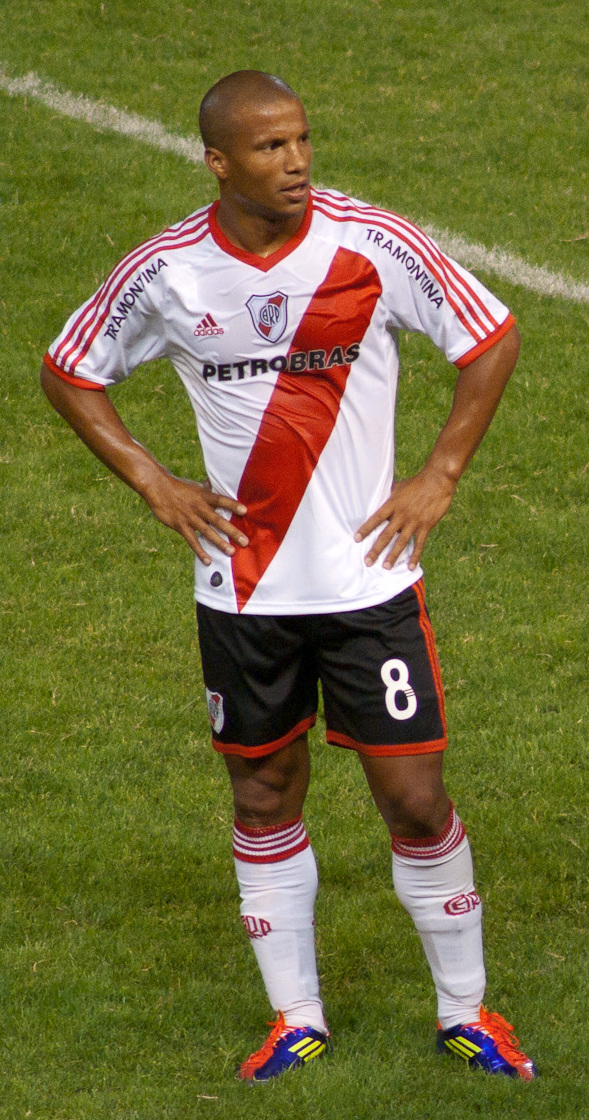
Carlos Sánchez, who scored the only goal of the first leg.

The first leg was held at the Estadio Monumental, the home ground of River Plate. San Lorenzo were close to opening the scoring early through Martín Cauteruccio, but the Uruguayan striker failed to control the ball when he was one-on-one with goalkeeper Marcelo Barovero. From there on out, the home side took control of the game. They started exerting pressure in the opposing field, and orchestrated their first chance at the 11-minute mark, when a cross from Rodrigo Mora found Teófilo Gutiérrez, whose header forced goalkeeper Sebastián Torrico into a save. From the subsequent corner kick, Gutiérrez sent the ball into the crossbar.

Twenty minutes in, Mora sent another delivery to Gutiérrez, whose close-range header was saved by Torrico once again. Further danger was funneled by River Plate through Leonardo Pisculichi. In the 36th minute, the attacking midfielder delivered a corner into the San Lorenzo box, and Gutiérrez struck the crossbar with a bicycle kick. Two minutes later, another cross was sent after a set piece, being met by Jonatan Maidana, whose header struck the left post. The home side had one last chance to open the scoring before half-time, but a Mora shot went wide.

Just a minute after the restart, Barovero seemed to tackle Cauteruccio inside the penalty area. However, referee Germán Delfino indicated to play on. Eight minutes later, Cauteruccio missed another one-on-one chance with the goalkeeper after Pablo Barrientos played the ball through to him. River Plate continued to create opportunities but lacked penetration in attack, and manager Marcelo Gallardo introduced Gonzalo Martínez for Mora to break the deadlock.. The change made a difference when Martínez filtered the ball between the lines to Carlos Sánchez, who unleashed a powerful strike to score the only goal of the first leg. During the final minutes, Leandro Romagnoli lost his composure and fouled Leonel Vangioni with a disqualifying tackle, for which he received a straight red card.

In the post-match interview, Gallardo addressed the criticism River Plate had received after their previous match against Boca Juniors: "Many things were said during the week, some justified, others not. You can't analyze one match and believe that this team is finished." Regarding his team's performance, he stated: "There was a trophy at stake and the players responded. That gives me peace of mind. Our focus was on the start of the official competition, just as we had announced. Today we were back to our old ways."

=== Details ===
6 February 2015
21:00 UTC−3

River Plate (Argentina)	1–0	(Argentina) San Lorenzo
Sánchez 78'	Report

Estadio Monumental, Buenos Aires
Attendance: 64,000
Referee: Germán Delfino (Argentina)

River Plate	San Lorenzo

GK	1	(Argentina) Marcelo Barovero (c)
RB	25	(Argentina) Gabriel Mercado
CB	2	(Argentina) Jonatan Maidana
CB	6	(Argentina) Ramiro Funes Mori
LB	21	(Argentina) Leonel Vangioni	(yellow card) 88'
RM	8	(Uruguay) Carlos Sánchez
DM	5	(Argentina) Matías Kranevitter	(yellow card) 30'
LM	16	(Argentina) Ariel Rojas		(substituted off) 72'
AM	15	(Argentina) Leonardo Pisculichi
CF	7	(Uruguay) Rodrigo Mora		(substituted off) 62'
CF	19	(Colombia) Teófilo Gutiérrez		(substituted off) 72'
Substitutes:
GK	12	(Argentina) Julio Chiarini
DF	3	(Colombia) Éder Álvarez Balanta
DF	20	(Argentina) Germán Pezzella
MF	10	(Argentina) Pity Martínez		(substituted on) 62'
MF	18	(Uruguay) Camilo Mayada		(substituted on) 72'
MF	23	(Argentina) Leonardo Ponzio
FW	9	(Argentina) Fernando Cavenaghi		(substituted on) 72'
Manager:
(Argentina) Marcelo Gallardo

GK	12	(Argentina) Sebastián Torrico
RB	7	(Argentina) Julio Buffarini	(yellow card) 59'
CB	2	(Argentina) Mauro Cetto
CB	6	(Argentina) Matías Caruzzo	(yellow card) 88'
LB	21	(Argentina) Emmanuel Mas
CM	5	(Argentina) Juan Ignacio Mercier (c)
CM	8	(Argentina) Enzo Kalinski
RW	22	(Argentina) Franco Mussis
AM	23	(Argentina) Sebastián Blanco		(substituted off) 76'
LW	11	(Argentina) Pablo Barrientos		(substituted off) 62'
CF	9	(Uruguay) Martín Cauteruccio		(substituted off) 66'
Substitutes:
GK	1	(Argentina) Leo Franco
DF	3	(Colombia) Mario Yepes
MF	10	(Argentina) Leandro Romagnoli	(red card) 88'	(substituted on) 62'
MF	25	(Argentina) Facundo Quignon
FW	15	(Argentina) Héctor Villalba
FW	16	(Argentina) Gonzalo Verón		(substituted on) 76'
FW	18	(Argentina) Mauro Matos		(substituted on) 66'
Manager:
(Argentina) Edgardo Bauza

Assistant referees
Diego Bonfá (Argentina)
Cristian Navarro (Argentina)
Fourth official
Silvio Trucco (Argentina)

Match rules

- 90 minutes
- Seven named substitutes, of which up to three may be used

== Second leg ==
=== Summary ===
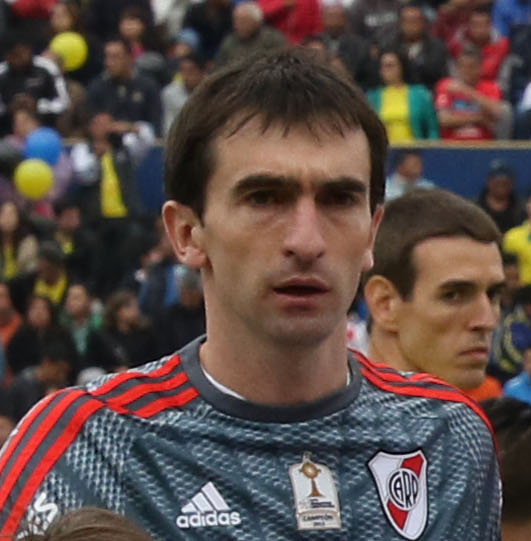
Marcelo Barovero saved three clear chances, earning a clean sheet.

River Plate's 1–0 victory in the first leg meant that San Lorenzo needed to score a goal to force the tie into extra-time. At the Estadio Nuevo Gasómetro, the home team started by applying high pressure, which yielded them two corner kicks in the first five minutes. San Lorenzo were forced into an early change when Franco Mussis was injured and replaced by fellow midfielder Facundo Quignon.

River Plate eventually matched San Lorenzo's level and created the first clear chance of the game in the 18th minute, when Sánchez crossed for Gutiérrez. Gutiérrez then laid the ball to Ariel Rojas, who sent another delivery over to Sánchez, whose shot went just wide of the goal. They had a follow up chance in the 29th minute, when a volley from Pisculichi was also off the mark. San Lorenzo managed to respond by allowing their full-backs to design two of their best chances. In the 35th minute, a volley to the right post from centre-back Matías Caruzzo was deflected by Barovero after Julio Buffarini broke down the right flank. Six minutes later, left-back Emmanuel Mas entered the penalty area and put a low cross for Sebastián Blanco, whose shot on net got blocked by Vangioni.

In the second half, San Lorenzo pressed forward from the start once more, and had two situations in quick succession through Cauteruccio. Their manager Edgardo Bauza brought in forwards Mauro Matos and Gonzalo Verón to help in finding the equaliser. Nonetheless, River Plate would take the lead at the 22-minute mark. Following a team play, striker Rodrigo Mora controlled a cross from the right, preventing a goal kick. He then turned back swiftly as he passed the ball to Sánchez, who put a shot on net that took a deflection but ultimately went in. Three minutes later, San Lorenzo had two chances in close succession, but they were both fended off by Barovero. The goalkeeper first stopped a bounced header from Matos, and he followed up shortly after by saving a Héctor Villalba shot with his chest. River Plate would also miss two chances to extend their lead, as Torrico stepped up to save further efforts from Sánchez and Martínez. During the last ten minutes of the match, River Plate centre-back Ramiro Funes Mori was handed a straight red card, while Buffarini was sent off in stoppage time, product of a second yellow card.

=== Details ===
11 February 2015
21:00 UTC−3

San Lorenzo (Argentina)	0–1	(Argentina) River Plate
	Report	Sánchez 68'

Estadio Nuevo Gasómetro, Buenos Aires
Attendance: 40,000
Referee: Néstor Pitana (Argentina)

San Lorenzo	River Plate

GK	12	(Argentina) Sebastián Torrico
RB	7	(Argentina) Julio Buffarini	(yellow card) 37' (yellow-red card) 90'
CB	2	(Argentina) Mauro Cetto
CB	6	(Argentina) Matías Caruzzo
LB	21	(Argentina) Emmanuel Mas
CM	22	(Argentina) Franco Mussis		(substituted off) 15'
CM	5	(Argentina) Juan Ignacio Mercier (c)
RW	15	(Argentina) Héctor Villalba	(yellow card) 83'
AM	23	(Argentina) Sebastián Blanco	(yellow card) 63'
LW	11	(Argentina) Pablo Barrientos		(substituted off) 56'
CF	9	(Uruguay) Martín Cauteruccio
Substitutes:
GK	1	(Argentina) Leo Franco
DF	3	(Colombia) Mario Yepes
DF	19	(Argentina) Fabricio Fontanini
MF	25	(Argentina) Facundo Quignon		(substituted on) 15'	(substituted off) 66'
MF	24	(Argentina) Juan Cavallaro
FW	16	(Argentina) Gonzalo Verón		(substituted on) 66'
FW	18	(Argentina) Mauro Matos		(substituted on) 56'
Manager:
(Argentina) Edgardo Bauza

GK	1	(Argentina) Marcelo Barovero (c)	(yellow card) 81'
RB	25	(Argentina) Gabriel Mercado	(yellow card) 56'
CB	2	(Argentina) Jonatan Maidana	(yellow card) 81'
CB	6	(Argentina) Ramiro Funes Mori	(red card) 81'
LB	21	(Argentina) Leonel Vangioni	(yellow card) 75'
RM	8	(Uruguay) Carlos Sánchez	(yellow card) 37'
DM	5	(Argentina) Matías Kranevitter
LM	16	(Argentina) Ariel Rojas
AM	15	(Argentina) Leonardo Pisculichi		(substituted off) 61'
CF	7	(Uruguay) Rodrigo Mora		(substituted off) 84'
CF	19	(Colombia) Teófilo Gutiérrez		(substituted off) 74'
Substitutes:
GK	12	(Argentina) Julio Chiarini
DF	3	(Colombia) Éder Álvarez Balanta
DF	20	(Argentina) Germán Pezzella		(substituted on) 84'
MF	10	(Argentina) Pity Martínez		(substituted on) 61'
MF	18	(Uruguay) Camilo Mayada		(substituted on) 74'
MF	23	(Argentina) Leonardo Ponzio
FW	9	(Argentina) Fernando Cavenaghi
Manager:
(Argentina) Marcelo Gallardo

Assistant referees
Hernán Maidana (Argentina)
Juan Pablo Belatti (Argentina)
Fourth official
Fernando Rapallini (Argentina)

Match rules

- 90 minutes
- 30 minutes of extra time if necessary
- Penalty shoot-out if scores still level
- Seven named substitutes, of which up to three may be used

== Post-match ==
River Plate goalkeeper Barovero played a key role in the Recopa Sudamericana win. Discussing his team’s recent results, he said: "It's always good to win a title. What happened with Boca Juniors was sad [...] but the official season only started on Friday and it was important for us to win this match."

San Lorenzo's manager Bauza also commented on the match, demonstrating content despite the loss: "We played better than in the previous game, as we had fewer mistakes with the ball and didn't allow [River Plate] to control the game. We created 12 chances, but failed to capitalize on them." He also made a remark about his team: "Tomorrow they'll get back on their feet, this squad has shown plenty of resilience in difficult times".

San Lorenzo's merits in the 2015 Argentine Primera División yielded them a second place, therefore qualifying for the 2016 Copa Libertadores. River Plate finished the league in ninth place, but would also enter the tournament as reigning champions following their victory in the 2015 finals.

== See also ==
- 2015 Copa Libertadores
- 2015 Copa Sudamericana
- 2015 Club Atlético River Plate season
