= Sebastián Torrico =

Argentine footballer

Personal information
- Full name: Sebastián Alberto Torrico
- Date of birth: 22 February 1980 (age 46)
- Place of birth: Luján de Cuyo, Mendoza, Argentina
- Height: 1.86 m (6 ft 1 in)
- Position: Goalkeeper

Youth career
- Godoy Cruz

Senior career*
Years	Team	Apps	(Gls)
2001–2013	Godoy Cruz	178	(0)
2008–2010	→ Argentinos Juniors (loan)	64	(0)
2012–2013	→ San Lorenzo (loan)	2	(0)
2013–2022	San Lorenzo	171	(0)
Total		415	(0)
- * Club domestic league appearances and goals

Sebastián Alberto Torrico (born 22 February 1980 in Luján de Cuyo, Mendoza) is an Argentine former footballer who played a goalkeeper.

== Honours ==
Godoy Cruz

- Primera B Nacional: Season 2005/06

San Lorenzo

- Argentine Primera División: 2013 Inicial
- Copa Libertadores: 2014
- Supercopa Argentina: 2015
