= Matías Kranevitter =

Argentine footballer (born 1993)

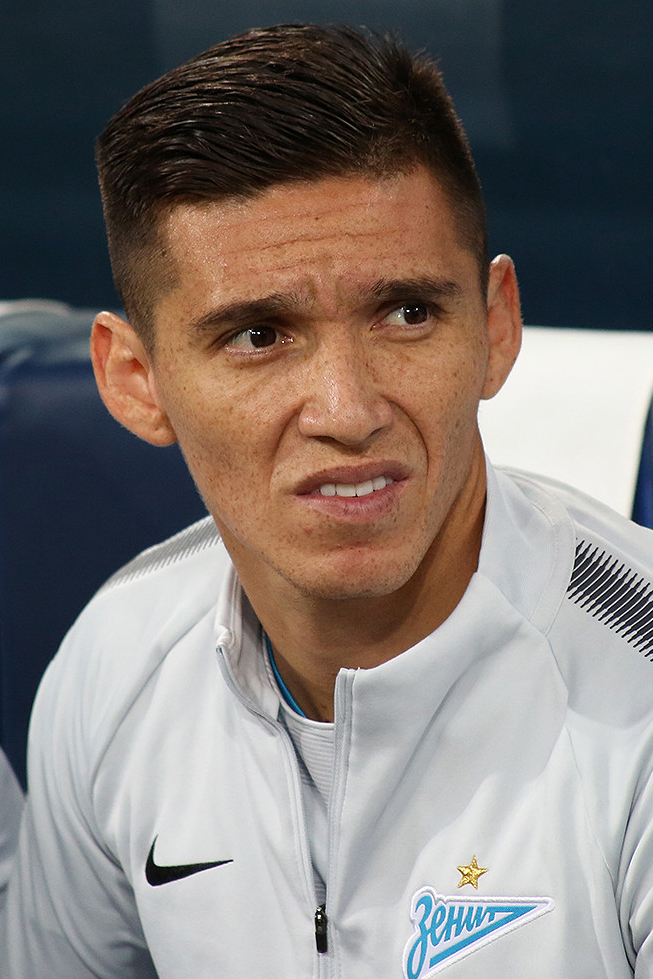
- Kranevitter with Zenit.

Personal information
- Full name: Claudio Matías Kranevitter
- Date of birth: 21 May 1993 (age 33)
- Place of birth: San Miguel de Tucumán, Argentina
- Height: 1.78 m (5 ft 10 in)
- Position: Defensive midfielder

Team information
- Current team: Racing Club
- Number: 5

Youth career
- San Martín-T
- 2007–2012: River Plate

Senior career*
| Years | Team | Apps | (Gls) |
| 2011–2015 | River Plate | 58 | (0) |
| 2015–2017 | Atlético Madrid | 8 | (0) |
| 2016–2017 | → Sevilla (loan) | 21 | (0) |
| 2017–2019 | Zenit | 29 | (0) |
| 2020–2022 | Monterrey | 90 | (1) |
| 2023–2025 | River Plate | 34 | (0) |
| 2025–2026 | Fatih Karagümrük | 23 | (1) |
| 2026– | Racing Club | 10 | (0) |

International career^{‡}
| 2012–2013 | Argentina U20 | 4 | (0) |
| 2015–2017 | Argentina | 9 | (0) |
- * Club domestic league appearances and goals as of 18:02, 8 November 2026 (UTC) ‡ National team caps and goals as of 11 November 2017 (UTC)

Claudio Matías Kranevitter (Spanish pronunciation: [maˈti.as kɾaneˈβiteɾ]; born 21 May 1993) is an Argentine professional footballer who plays as a defensive midfielder for Argentine Primera División club Racing Club.

== Club career ==
=== River Plate ===
Born in San Miguel de Tucumán, Kranevitter started his career at San Martín de Tucumán's youth setup, but left the club at the age of 12 due to his family's poor financial situation. In 2007, aged 14, he joined River Plate after impressing on a trial.

After being initially assigned to the reserves, Kranevitter was also a member of the under-20s during its U-20 Copa Libertadores winning campaign in 2012. On 2 December of that year he made his first team debut, coming on as a second-half substitute in a 1–0 home win against Lanús.

Kranevitter was promoted to the main squad by new manager Ramón Díaz. Initially a backup to Leonardo Ponzio and Cristian Ledesma, he appeared in 30 matches during the 2013–14 season, 16 as a starter, overcoming the latter midway through the campaign.

In September 2014, already a regular starter, Kranevitter suffered a metatarsus injury, being ruled out until the following year. In October, however, he trained with crutches and returned to action in late November, being utilized in both legs of 2014 Copa Sudamericana Finals. The successes continued in 2015, highlighted by winning the Recopa Sudamericana and the Copa Libertadores.

=== Atlético Madrid ===
On 25 August 2015, La Liga side Atlético Madrid reached an agreement with River for the sale of Kranevitter, for a rumoured fee of €8 million. He was officially announced three days later, being immediately loaned back to River until December in order to compete in the Club World Cup.

Assigned to the main squad in January 2016, Kranevitter was handed the no. 8 shirt. He made his debut on 6 January in the first leg of the Copa del Rey Round of 16 against Rayo Vallecano. He made his league debut on 14 February, coming on as a substitute for goalscorer Fernando Torres in a 1–0 away win against Getafe CF.

==== Sevilla (loan) ====
On 7 July 2016, Kranevitter was loaned to fellow top-tier club Sevilla FC, in a season-long deal.

=== Zenit ===
On 8 August 2017, he moved to the Russian Premier League club FC Zenit Saint Petersburg, signing a 4-year contract. He joined his former River Plate teammates Sebastián Driussi and Emanuel Mammana at the club. On 24 January 2020 Zenit confirmed that Kranevitter left the club.

=== Monterrey ===
On 26 January 2020, Kranevitter joined Liga MX club Monterrey. He scored his first professional goal on 19 September 2021 in a game against Tigres, helping Monterrey secure a 2–0 victory over their rivals.

=== Return to River Plate ===
On 12 December 2022, Kranevitter returned to River Plate, signing a 3-year contract.

== International career ==
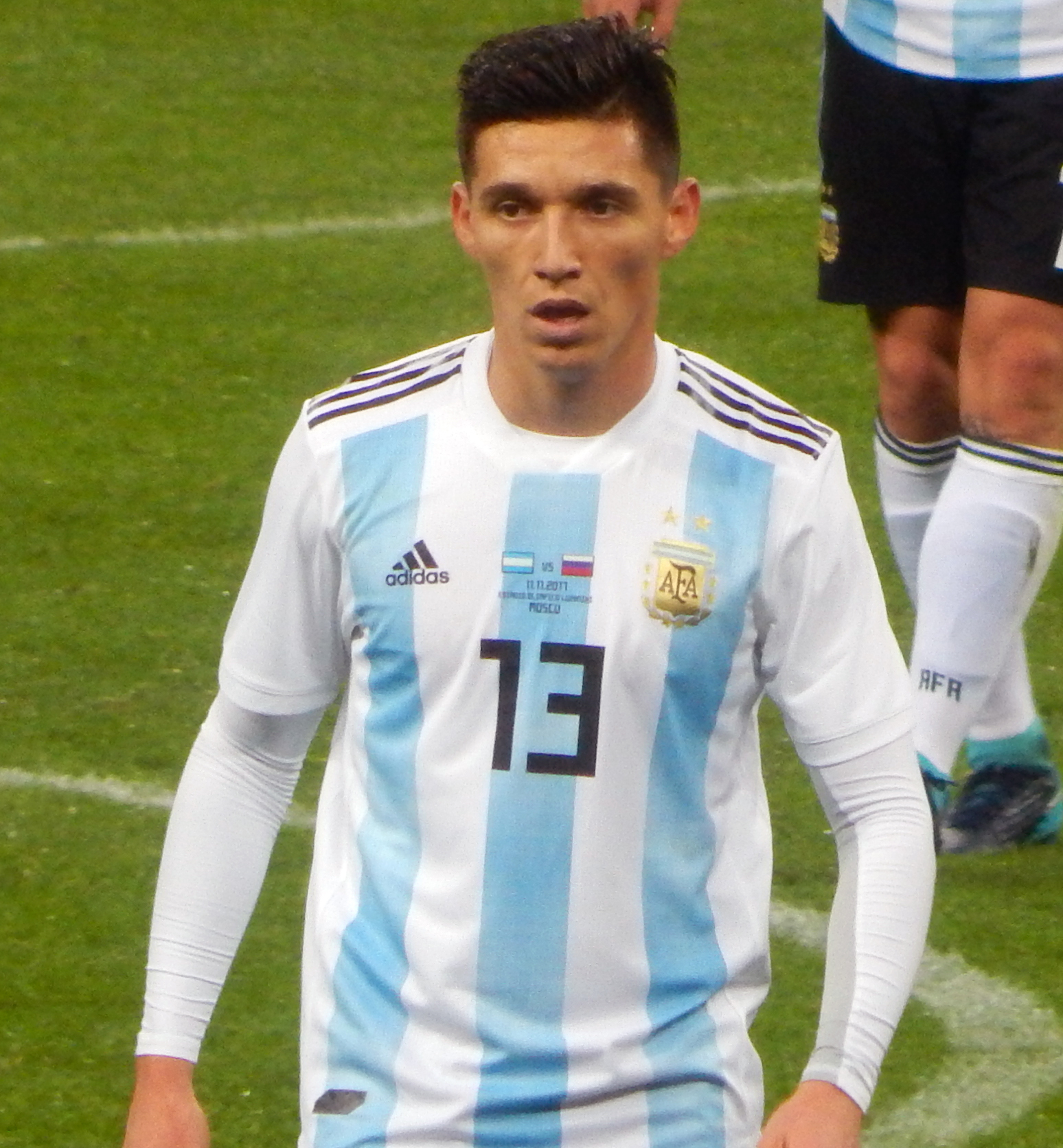
Kranevitter plays for Argentina national team against Russia in 2017

Kranevitter represented Argentina at under-20 level in 2014 South American Youth Football Championship. He appeared in three matches, all as a starter, as his side was knocked out in the group stage.

On 24 August 2015, Kranevitter was called up to the main squad for two friendlies against Bolivia and Mexico as a replacement to injured Lucas Biglia. He made his full international debut on 4 September, starting in a 7–0 routing of the former at the BBVA Compass Stadium in Houston.

Kranevitter was nominated in the 2016 Copa América squad and was part of the Argentine side that ran to the final. He was subbed on in the 57th minute of the final against Chile, which Chile won 4–2 on penalties.

== Style of play ==
Mainly a defensive midfielder, Kranevitter has been deployed in a role focused on breaking up opposition attacks, protecting the defensive line, and helping to control possession and tempo. He has also been noted for his tackling and positioning.

Kranevitter is often compared to Javier Mascherano, due to both being River Plate youth graduates and having the same playing style.

== Personal life ==
Kranevitter also played golf during his youth, and stated that he "would be a golfer if he hadn't chosen football".

== Career statistics ==
=== Club ===
As of match played 21 May 2023

| Club | Season | League | | | Cup | | Continental | | Other | | Total | |
| Club | Season | Division | Apps | Goals | Apps | Goals | Apps | Goals | Apps | Goals | Apps | Goals |
|---|---|---|---|---|---|---|---|---|---|---|---|---|
| River Plate | 2012–13 | Argentine Primera División | 5 | 0 | 0 | 0 | – | | – | | 5 | 0 |
| River Plate | 2013–14 | Argentine Primera División | 29 | 0 | 0 | 0 | 6 | 0 | – | | 35 | 0 |
| River Plate | 2014 | Argentine Primera División | 6 | 0 | 0 | 0 | 4 | 0 | – | | 10 | 0 |
| River Plate | 2015 | Argentine Primera División | 17 | 0 | 0 | 0 | 19 | 0 | 5 (Note: Two appearances in Recopa Sudamericana, two appearances in FIFA Club World Cup, one appearance in Suruga Bank Championship) | 0 | 41 | 0 |
| River Plate | Total | | 57 | 0 | 0 | 0 | 29 | 0 | 5 | 0 | 91 | 0 |
| Atlético Madrid | 2015–16 | La Liga | 8 | 0 | 2 | 0 | 1 | 0 | – | | 11 | 0 |
| Atlético Madrid | Total | | 8 | 0 | 2 | 0 | 1 | 0 | - | | 11 | 0 |
| Sevilla | 2016–17 | La Liga | 21 | 0 | 4 | 0 | 4 | 0 | 3 (Note: Two appearances in Supercopa de España, one appearance in UEFA Super Cup) | 0 | 32 | 0 |
| Sevilla | Total | | 21 | 0 | 4 | 0 | 4 | 0 | 3 | 0 | 32 | 0 |
| Zenit Saint Petersburg | 2017–18 | Russian Premier League | 21 | 0 | 0 | 0 | 12 | 0 | – | | 33 | 0 |
| Zenit Saint Petersburg | 2018–19 | Russian Premier League | 6 | 0 | 2 | 0 | 7 | 0 | – | | 15 | 0 |
| Zenit Saint Petersburg | 2019–20 | Russian Premier League | 2 | 0 | 2 | 0 | 0 | 0 | – | | 4 | 0 |
| Zenit Saint Petersburg | Total | | 29 | 0 | 4 | 0 | 19 | 0 | 0 | 0 | 52 | 0 |
| Monterrey | 2019–20 | Liga MX | 3 | 0 | 4 | 0 | – | | – | | 7 | 0 |
| Monterrey | 2020–21 | Liga MX | 35 | 0 | 0 | 0 | 7 | 0 | 2 (Note: Appearances in FIFA Club World Cup) | 0 | 44 | 0 |
| Monterrey | 2021–22 | Liga MX | 33 | 1 | 0 | 0 | 0 | 0 | 0 | 0 | 33 | 1 |
| Monterrey | 2022–23 | Liga MX | 19 | 0 | 0 | 0 | 0 | 0 | 0 | 0 | 19 | 0 |
| Monterrey | Total | | 90 | 1 | 4 | 0 | 7 | 0 | 2 | 0 | 103 | 1 |
| River Plate | 2023 | Argentine Primera División | 2 | 0 | 0 | 0 | 1 | 0 | 0 | 0 | 3 | 0 |
| Career total | | | 119 | 1 | 14 | 0 | 53 | 0 | 8 | 0 | 292 | 1 |

=== International ===
As of 11 November 2017

Argentina
| Year | Appears | Goals |
| 2015 | 3 | 0 |
| 2016 | 5 | 0 |
| 2017 | 1 | 0 |
| Total | 9 | 0 |

== Honours ==
Youth River Plate

- U-20 Copa Libertadores: 2012

River Plate

- Argentine Primera División: 2014 Final, 2023
- Copa Sudamericana: 2014
- Recopa Sudamericana: 2015
- Copa Libertadores: 2015
- Suruga Bank Championship: 2015
- U-20 Copa Libertadores: 2012
- FIFA Club World Cup runner-up: 2015

Zenit

- Russian Premier League: 2018–19, 2019–20
- Russian Cup: 2019–20

Monterrey

- Copa MX: 2019–20
- CONCACAF Champions League: 2021

Argentina

- Copa América runner-up: 2016

Individual

- Copa Libertadores Team of the Year: 2015
