= Juan David Valencia =

Colombian footballer (born 1986)

Personal information
- Full name: Juan David Valencia Hinestroza
- Date of birth: January 15, 1986 (age 40)
- Place of birth: Medellín, Colombia
- Height: 1.80 m (5 ft 11 in)
- Position: Left back

Youth career
- Independiente Medellín

Senior career*
Years	Team	Apps	(Gls)
2004–2008	Independiente Medellín	20	(0)
2007–2008	→ Caracas (loan)	18	(1)
2008–2009	Atlético Huila	29	(8)
2009–2011	Independiente Medellín	55	(3)
2011–2012	→ Junior (loan)	31	(5)
2012–2015	Atlético Nacional	102	(14)
2016	Santa Fe	9	(0)
2016–2017	Independiente Medellín	25	(4)
2017–2019	Santa Fe	31	(4)

International career
2010	Colombia	3	(0)
- * Club domestic league appearances and goals as of 20:10, 30 September 2019 (UTC)

Juan David Valencia Hinestroza (born January 15, 1986) is a Colombian professional footballer who plays as a left back, although he can also play as a midfielder.

== Club career ==
Valencia started his footballing career in the youth ranks of Independiente Medellín. After making his debut in the Colombian First Division with the Medellín club, Valencia was loaned out to Venezuelan side Caracas F.C.. Valencia quickly established himself as a fixture on the left side of the Caracas midfield. He has also played left back.

He scored his first league goal with Caracas in a 2–1 victory over rival Unión Atlético Maracaibo. He has also started all the club's matches in the 2008 Copa Libertadores, scoring in a 1–1 draw versus Brazilian side Cruzeiro Esporte Clube on March 18, 2008.

In 2012, Atlético Nacional bought the half of his rights after being champion of Liga Postobon with Atlético Junior.

== Career statistics ==
=== Club ===
As of match played 30 September 2019.

Club	Division	Season	League		Cup		Continental		Total
Club	Division	Season	Apps	Goals	Apps	Goals	Apps	Goals	Apps	Goals
Independiente Medellín
Independiente Medellín	Categoría Primera A	2004	3	0	—		—		3	0
Independiente Medellín	Categoría Primera A	2005	9	0	—		0	0	9	0
Independiente Medellín	Categoría Primera A	2006	7	0	—		0	0	7	0
Independiente Medellín	Categoría Primera A	2007	1	0	—		—		1	0
Independiente Medellín	Total		20	0	0	0	0	0	20	0
Caracas
Caracas	Venezuelan Primera División	2008	18	1	—		6	1	24	2
Caracas	Total		18	1	0	0	6	1	24	2
Atlético Huila
Atlético Huila	Categoría Primera A	2008	11	3	1	0	—		12	3
Atlético Huila	Categoría Primera A	2009	17	5	1	0	—		18	5
Atlético Huila	Total		28	8	2	0	0	0	30	8
Independiente Medellín
Independiente Medellín	Categoría Primera A	2009	23	1	—		—		23	1
Independiente Medellín	Categoría Primera A	2010	31	2	0	0	6	0	37	2
Independiente Medellín	Total		54	3	0	0	6	0	60	3
Junior
Junior	Categoría Primera A	2011	31	5	1	0	7	1	39	6
Junior	Total		31	5	1	0	7	1	39	6
Atlético Nacional
Atlético Nacional	Categoría Primera A	2012	26	3	12	3	5	1	43	7
Atlético Nacional	Categoría Primera A	2013	35	3	11	1	7	1	53	5
Atlético Nacional	Categoría Primera A	2014	23	5	8	0	14	0	45	5
Atlético Nacional	Categoría Primera A	2015	18	3	2	0	7	0	27	3
Atlético Nacional	Total		102	14	33	4	33	2	168	20
Santa Fe
Santa Fe	Categoría Primera A	2016	9	0	0	0	1	0	10	0
Santa Fe	Total		9	0	0	0	1	0	10	0
Independiente Medellín
Independiente Medellín	Categoría Primera A	2016	13	1	5	0	6	0	24	1
Independiente Medellín	Categoría Primera A	2017	12	3	3	0	6	0	21	3
Independiente Medellín	Total		25	4	8	0	12	0	45	4
Santa Fe
Santa Fe	Categoría Primera A	2017	22	3	3	0	4	0	29	3
Santa Fe	Categoría Primera A	2018	3	0	0	0	6	0	9	0
Santa Fe	Categoría Primera A	2019	6	1	1	1	—		7	2
Santa Fe	Total		31	4	4	1	10	0	45	5
Career total			318	39	48	5	75	4	441	48

== Honours ==
Flamengo

- Categoría Primera A (2): 2004-I, 2009-II

Caracas FC

- Venezuelan Primera División (1): 2006-07

Atlético Junior

- Categoría Primera A (1): 2011-II

Atlético Nacional

- Categoría Primera A (3): 2013-I, 2013-II, 2014-I
- Copa Colombia (2): 2012, 2013
- Superliga Colombiana (1): 2012
