= Ariel Rojas =

Argentine footballer

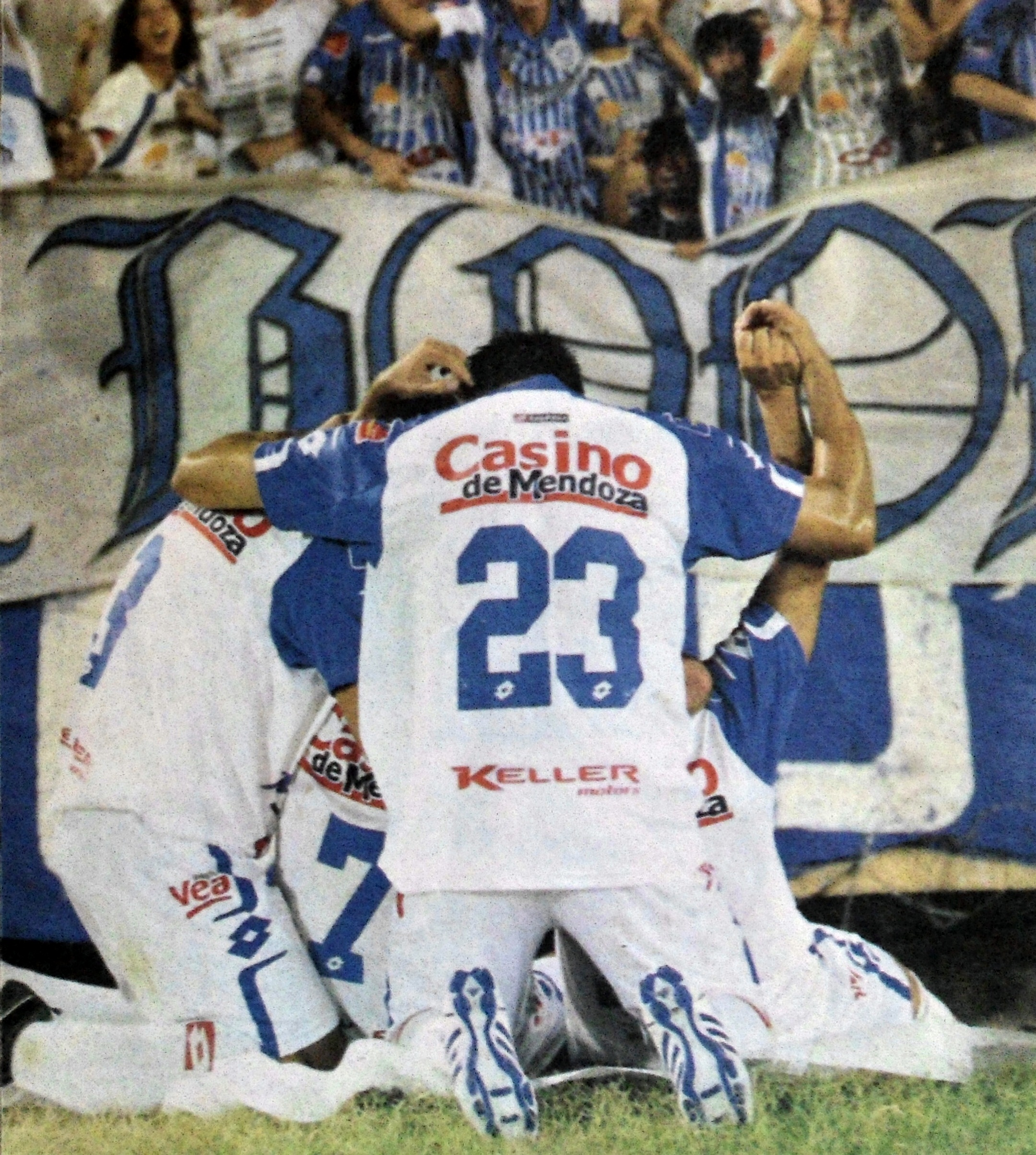

Personal information
- Full name: Ariel Mauricio Rojas
- Date of birth: 16 January 1986 (age 40)
- Place of birth: Garín, Argentina
- Height: 1.82 m (6 ft 0 in)
- Position: Midfielder

Youth career
- Vélez Sársfield

Senior career*
Years	Team	Apps	(Gls)
2007	Vélez Sársfield	3	(0)
2008–2012	Godoy Cruz	170	(11)
2012–2015	River Plate	112	(2)
2015–2017	Cruz Azul	41	(1)
2017–2018	River Plate	24	(1)
2018–2019	San Lorenzo	13	(0)
2019–2020	Atlético Tucumán	20	(0)
2020–2021	Central Córdoba SdE	13	(0)
2021–2024	Belgrano	62	(0)
- * Club domestic league appearances and goals

Ariel Mauricio Rojas (born 16 January 1986) is an Argentine former professional footballer who played as a midfielder. Rojas is one of the few players who are two-times champions of the Copa Libertadores with River Plate and he is currently working as sporting director at Belgrano de Córdoba.

== Club career ==
Rojas began his professional playing career with Vélez Sársfield of the Primera División. He made his league debut as a substitute on 26 August 2007 in a 4–2 home win against Gimnasia y Esgrima de Jujuy. He made only 3 appearances for Vélez, all as a substitute.

In 2008, he joined 2nd division side Godoy Cruz and was part of the team that secured promotion to the Primera División at the end of the 2007-08 season. Rojas scored his first goal in professional football on 13 September 2009 in a 1–1 draw against Huracán.

== Career statistics ==
=== Club ===
Club performance			League			Cup			Super Cup			Continental			Total		
Season	Club	League	Apps	Goals	Assists	Apps	Goals	Assists	Apps	Goals	Assists	Apps	Goals	Assists	Apps	Goals	Assists
2007	Vélez Sarsfield	Primera División	3	0	0	—			—			—			3	0	0
Total			3	0	0	—			—			—			3	0	0

== Honours ==
River Plate

- Argentina Primera Division: 2014 Final
- Copa Sudamericana: 2014
- Recopa Sudamericana: 2015
- Copa Libertadores: 2015, 2018

Belgrano

- Primera Nacional: 2022
