= Emanuel Mammana =

Argentine footballer (born 1996)

Personal information
- Full name: Emanuel Hernán Mammana
- Date of birth: 10 February 1996 (age 30)
- Place of birth: Merlo, Argentina
- Height: 1.83 m (6 ft 0 in)
- Position: Centre-back

Team information
- Current team: Vélez Sarsfield
- Number: 2

Senior career*
Years	Team	Apps	(Gls)
2014–2016	River Plate	24	(1)
2016–2017	Lyon	17	(1)
2017–2022	Zenit Saint Petersburg	25	(0)
2020–2022	→ Sochi (loan)	22	(0)
2022–2024	River Plate	33	(2)
2024–	Vélez Sarsfield	67	(1)

International career
2013	Argentina U17	16	(0)
2015	Argentina U20	10	(0)
2014–2017	Argentina	3	(0)
- * Club domestic league appearances and goals as of 16:45, 16 June 2026 (UTC)

Emanuel Hernán Mammana (Spanish pronunciation: [eˈmanwel maˈmana]; born 10 February 1996) is an Argentine professional footballer who plays as a centre-back for Argentine Primera División club Vélez Sarsfield.

== Club career ==
=== River Plate ===
Mammana made his debut for River Plate on 3 December, in the 2014 Copa Sudamericana Final 1st leg. He scored his first senior goal on 14 March 2016, in a 4–1 loss to Colón.

=== Lyon ===
On 7 July 2016, he signed a five-year contract with French club Lyon. He scored his first goal for the club in a 1–1 draw with Bordeaux.

=== Zenit Saint Petersburg ===
On 31 July 2017, Mammana signed a five-year contract with the Russian club FC Zenit Saint Petersburg. On 11 March 2018 in a game against FC Rostov he suffered an anterior cruciate ligament injury which forced him to miss almost six months of games, that time period included the 2018 FIFA World Cup. Upon his recovery, he could not get back into the lineup in the 2018–19 season. On 6 October 2019, he suffered another ligament injury in a game against FC Ural Yekaterinburg and missed 9 more months of games, before returning in the last game of the 2019–20 season. In June 2021, after returning from Sochi loan, he was sent by Zenit to train with the second team, FC Zenit-2 Saint Petersburg. On 7 January 2022, his contract with Zenit was terminated by mutual consent.

==== Loan to Sochi ====
On 7 August 2020, he joined PFC Sochi on loan for the 2020–21 season. On 19 July 2021, Mammana returned to Sochi on loan for the 2021–22 season.

=== Return to River Plate ===
On 10 January 2022, Mammana rescinded his contract with Zenit, and returned to River Plate.

== International career ==
Mammana played his first international game with the senior national team on 7 June 2014 in a 2–0 win against Slovenia coming on as a substitute for Javier Mascherano in the 77th minute.

== Career statistics ==
=== Club ===
As of match played 22 June 2023

Appearances and goals by club, season and competition
Club	Season	League			National cup		League cup		Continental (Note: Includes Copa Sudamericana, Copa Libertadores, UEFA Champions League, UEFA Europa League, UEFA Europa Conference League)		Other		Total	
Club	Season	Division	Apps	Goals	Apps	Goals	Apps	Goals	Apps	Goals	Apps	Goals	Apps	Goals
River Plate	2013–14	Argentine Primera División	0	0	1	0	–		–		–		1	0
River Plate	2014	Argentine Primera División	2	0	0	0	–		1	0	–		3	0
River Plate	2015	Argentine Primera División	14	0	0	0	–		5	0	–		19	0
River Plate	2016	Argentine Primera División	8	1	0	0	–		4	1	–		12	2
River Plate	Total		24	1	1	0	–		10	1	–		35	2
Lyon	2016–17	Ligue 1	17	1	1	0	1	0	5	0	0	0	24	1
Lyon II	2016–17	National 2	4	0	–		–		–		–		4	0
Zenit St. Petersburg	2017–18	Russian Premier League	16	0	0	0	–		10	0	–		26	0
Zenit St. Petersburg	2018–19	Russian Premier League	6	0	1	0	–		4	0	–		11	0
Zenit St. Petersburg	2019–20	Russian Premier League	3	0	1	0	–		0	0	0	0	4	0
Zenit St. Petersburg	Total		25	0	2	0	–		14	0	–		41	0
Sochi (loan)	2020–21	Russian Premier League	18	0	1	0	–		–		–		19	0
Sochi (loan)	2021–22	Russian Premier League	4	0	0	0	–		1	0	–		5	0
Sochi (loan)	Total		22	0	1	0	–		1	0	–		24	0
River Plate	2022	Argentine Primera División	23	2	2	0	–		4	0	–		29	2
River Plate	2023	Argentine Primera División	5	0	0	0	–		2	0	–		7	0
River Plate	Total		28	2	2	0	–		6	0	–		36	2
Career total			120	4	7	0	1	0	36	1	0	0	164	4

== Honours ==
River Plate

- Primera División: 2014 Final, 2023
- Copa Sudamericana: 2014
- Recopa Sudamericana: 2015
- Copa Libertadores: 2015
- Suruga Bank Championship: 2015
- FIFA Club World Cup runner-up: 2015

Vélez Sarsfield

- Argentine Primera División: 2024
- Supercopa Internacional: 2024

Zenit Saint Petersburg

- Russian Premier League: 2018–19, 2019–20
- Russian Cup: 2019–20

Argentina U20

- South American Youth Football Championship: 2015

Argentina

- Superclásico de las Américas: 2017
