= Leonardo Pisculichi =

Argentine footballer (born 1984)

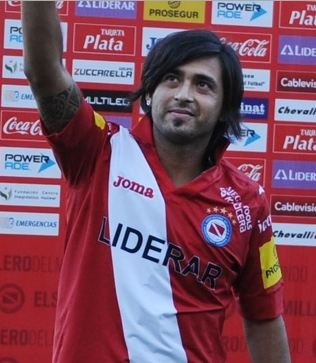
- Pisculichi in his return to Argentinos Juniors

Personal information
- Full name: Leonardo Nicolás Pisculichi
- Date of birth: 18 January 1984 (age 42)
- Place of birth: Rafael Castillo, Argentina
- Height: 1.75 m (5 ft 9 in)
- Position: Attacking midfielder

Senior career*
Years	Team	Apps	(Gls)
2002–2005	Argentinos Juniors	57	(18)
2006	Mallorca	20	(3)
2007–2012	Al-Arabi	112	(63)
2012–2013	Shandong Luneng	9	(1)
2014	Argentinos Juniors	15	(4)
2014–2016	River Plate	69	(10)
2017	Vitória	3	(0)
2017–2019	Argentinos Juniors	35	(5)
2019–2021	Burgos	38	(6)
Total		370	(114)

International career
2003	Argentina U20	2	(1)
- * Club domestic league appearances and goals

Leonardo Nicolás Pisculichi (Spanish pronunciation: [leoˈnaɾðo piskuˈlitʃi]; born 18 January 1984) is an Argentine retired footballer who played as an attacking midfielder. He won the Copa Sudamericana in 2014 and Copa Libertadores in 2015 with River Plate.

== Club career ==
Pisculichi started his career with Argentinos Juniors, making his first division debut on 20 February 2002, against Talleres de Córdoba. He was transferred to Spain's RCD Mallorca on 4 January 2006.

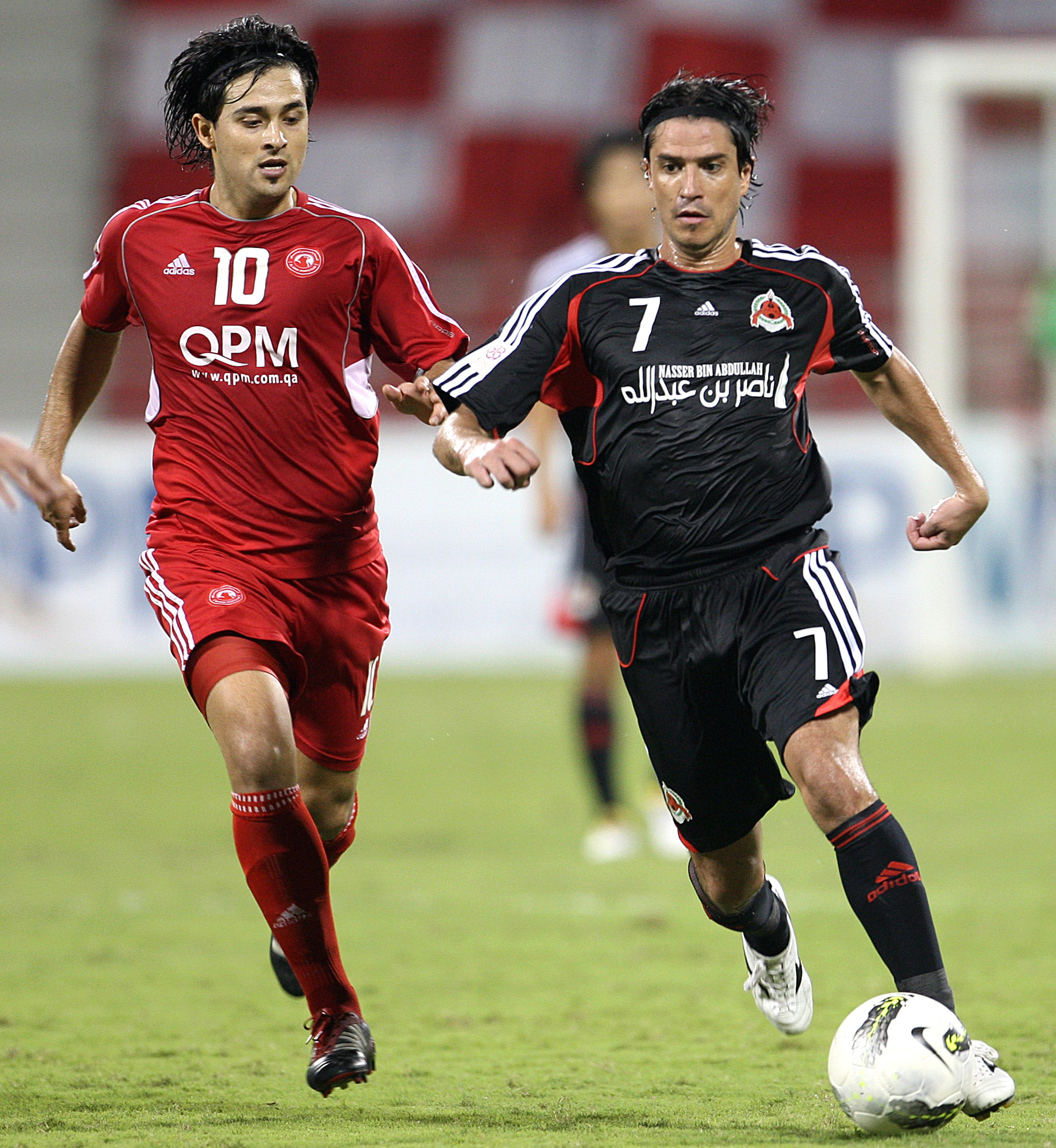
Pisculichi (in left) with Al-Arabi in action against Fábio César Montezine of Al-Rayyan in 2011

On 30 November 2006, he was transferred to Al-Arabi Sports Club in Doha, Qatar, for €3.9 million, with the move being made effective in January of the following year.

In July 2012, Pisculichi transferred to the Chinese Super League side Shandong Luneng Taishan. In 2014, he joined the Argentine powerhouse River Plate. While at River Plate, he won the 2014 Copa Sudamericana against Atletico Nacional. He left River in December 2016 and signed for Brazilian side Esporte Clube Vitória in January 2017.

=== Return to Argentina ===
Having left Vitória in May 2017, Pisculichi returned to the newly promoted Argentinos Juniors in August 2017. He was the first signee of the campaign.

=== Burgos CF ===
In June 2019, Pisculichi joined Spanish Segunda División B club Burgos CF.

== International career ==
Pisculichi played in the 2003 South American Youth Championship in Uruguay, representing the Argentina youth football team. He started the game against Uruguay and scored in the 82nd minute. He also came on as a substitute in a match against Brazil.

He was set to be naturalized to play for the Qatar national team by 2009. However, he had previously represented the Argentina under-20 team, rendering him ineligible to play for the Qatar team without special permission from FIFA.

The same scenario occurred in 2012. The Al-Arabi administration wanted to naturalize him to have an extra foreign player in their squad to participate in the AFC Champions League. He did not gain Qatari citizenship, and the local media criticized the club's management.

== Personal life ==
Pisculichi is of Croatian descent. His family Hispanicized their surname Piškulić (originally from the town of Novi Vinodolski) to its current spelling.

== Career statistics ==
=== Club ===
Appearances and goals by club, season and competition
Club	Season	League			State league (Note: Includes Campeonato Baiano)		National cup (Note: Includes Copa del Rey, Copa Argentina)		Continental		Other		Total	
Club	Season	Division	Apps	Goals	Apps	Goals	Apps	Goals	Apps	Goals	Apps	Goals	Apps	Goals
Argentinos Juniors	2001–02	Argentine Primera División	8	1	—		—		—		—		8	1
Argentinos Juniors	2002–03	Primera B Nacional	1	0	—		—		—		—		1	0
Argentinos Juniors	2003–04	Primera B Nacional	1	0	—		—		—		—		1	0
Argentinos Juniors	2004–05	Primera B Nacional	2	1	—		—		—		—		2	1
Argentinos Juniors	2004–05	Argentine Primera División	34	7	—		—		—		—		34	7
Argentinos Juniors	2005–06	Argentine Primera División	14	10	—		—		—		—		14	10
Argentinos Juniors	Total		60	19	0	0	0	0	0	0	0	0	60	19
Mallorca	2005–06	La Liga	16	3	—		—		—		—		16	3
Mallorca	2006–07	La Liga	4	0	—		1	0	—		—		5	0
Mallorca	Total		20	3	0	0	1	0	0	0	0	0	21	3
Al-Arabi	2006–07	Qatar Stars League	?	7	—			2	—		—		?	9
Al-Arabi	2007–08	Qatar Stars League	?	18	—			2	—			2	?	22
Al-Arabi	2008–09	Qatar Stars League	?	21	—			1	—			2	?	24
Al-Arabi	2009–10	Qatar Stars League	?	3	—		0	0	—			1	?	4
Al-Arabi	2010–11	Qatar Stars League	19	9	—		0	0		3		3	19	15
Al-Arabi	2011–12	Qatar Stars League	21	5	—		0	0	5 (Note: Appearances in AFC Champions League)	2	—		26	2
Al-Arabi	Total		112	63	0	0		5	5	5		8	117	80
Shandong Luneng	2012	Chinese Super League	2	0	—		0	0	—		—		2	0
Shandong Luneng	2013	Chinese Super League	7	1	—		0	0	—		—		7	1
Shandong Luneng	Total		9	1	0	0	0	0	0	0	0	0	9	1
Argentinos Juniors	2013–14	Argentine Primera División	15	4	—		—		—		—		15	4
River Plate	2014	Argentine Primera División	16	5	—		2	0	9 (Note: Appearances in Copa Sudamericana)	2	—		27	7
River Plate	2015	Argentine Primera División	17	0	—		2	0	12 (Note: Eight appearances in Copa Libertadores, four appearances and one goal in Copa Sudamericana)	1	3 (Note: Two appearances in Recopa Sudamericana, one appearance in FIFA Club World Cup)	0	34	1
River Plate	2016	Argentine Primera División	7	1	—		0	0	3 (Note: Appearances in Copa Libertadores)	1	—		10	2
River Plate	Total		40	6	0	0	4	1	24	3	3	0	71	10
Vitória	2017	Serie A	2	0	3 (Note: Appearances in Campeonato Baiano)	0	0	0	—		1	0	6	0
Argentinos Juniors	2017–18	Argentine Primera División	18	5	—		3	0	—		—		21	5
Argentinos Juniors	2018–19	Argentine Primera División	17	0	—		1	0	1	0	—		19	0
Argentinos Juniors	Total		110	28	0	0	4	0	1	0	0	0	115	28
Burgos	2019–20	Segunda División B	22	5	—		2	0	—		—		24	5
Burgos	2020–21	Segunda División B	10	1	—		0	0	—		—		10	1
Burgos	Total		32	6	0	0	2	0	0	0	0	0	34	6
Career total			325	107	3	0	11	6	30	8	4	5	?	124

== Honours ==
River Plate

- Copa Sudamericana: 2014
- Recopa Sudamericana: 2015
- Copa Libertadores: 2015
- Suruga Bank Championship: 2015
- FIFA Club World Cup runner-up: 2015

Vitória

- Campeonato Baiano: 2017

Argentina U20

- South American Youth Championship: 2003
