= Camilo Mayada =

Uruguayan footballer (born 1991)

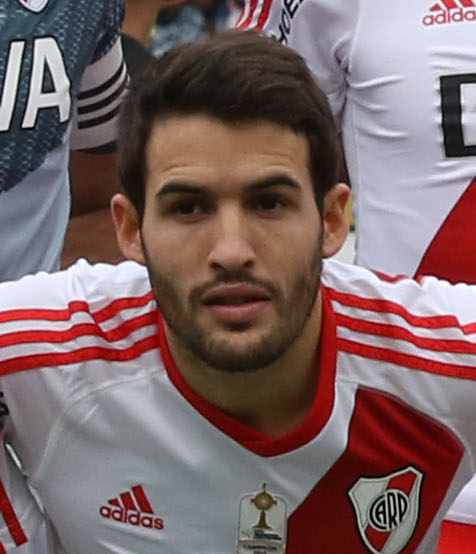
- Mayada with River Plate in 2016

Personal information
- Full name: Camilo Sebastián Mayada Mesa
- Date of birth: 8 January 1991 (age 35)
- Place of birth: Sauce, Uruguay
- Height: 1.74 m (5 ft 9 in)
- Position: Midfielder

Team information
- Current team: Danubio
- Number: 18

Youth career
- Danubio

Senior career*
Years	Team	Apps	(Gls)
2009–2015	Danubio	95	(5)
2015–2019	River Plate	83	(3)
2019–2021	Atlético San Luis	53	(0)
2021–2023	Libertad	32	(0)
2023–2025	Peñarol	28	(1)
2025–	Danubio	8	(2)

International career^{‡}
2009–2011	Uruguay U20	39	(2)
2012	Uruguay U23	1	(0)
2014–2018	Uruguay	8	(0)
- * Club domestic league appearances and goals as of 1 October 2025 ‡ National team caps and goals as of 16 October 2018

Camilo Sebastián Mayada Mesa (born 8 January 1991) is a Uruguayan professional footballer who plays as a full-back and midfielder for Danubio.

== Club career ==
A youth academy graduate of Danubio, Mayada made his professional debut on 4 October 2009 in a 4–2 win against Cerro. He scored his first goal on 16 September 2012 in a 4–2 loss against Montevideo Wanderers.

In July 2021, Mayada was announced as a new Libertad player, agreeing to a 3-year deal.

== International career ==
As a youth international, Mayada has represented Uruguay at 2011 South American U-20 Championship and 2011 FIFA U-20 World Cup.

Mayada made his senior team debut on 5 September 2014 in a friendly match against Japan. He came on as an 83rd-minute substitute for Martín Cáceres as Uruguay defeated Japan 2–0.

== Career statistics ==
=== International ===
As of 16 October 2018

Uruguay
Year	Apps	Goals
2014	4	0
2015	3	0
2016	0	0
2017	0	0
2018	1	0
Total	8	0

== Honours ==
River Plate

- Recopa Sudamericana: 2015, 2016, 2019
- Copa Libertadores: 2015, 2018
