= Rodrigo Mora (footballer, born 1987) =

Uruguayan footballer (born 1987)

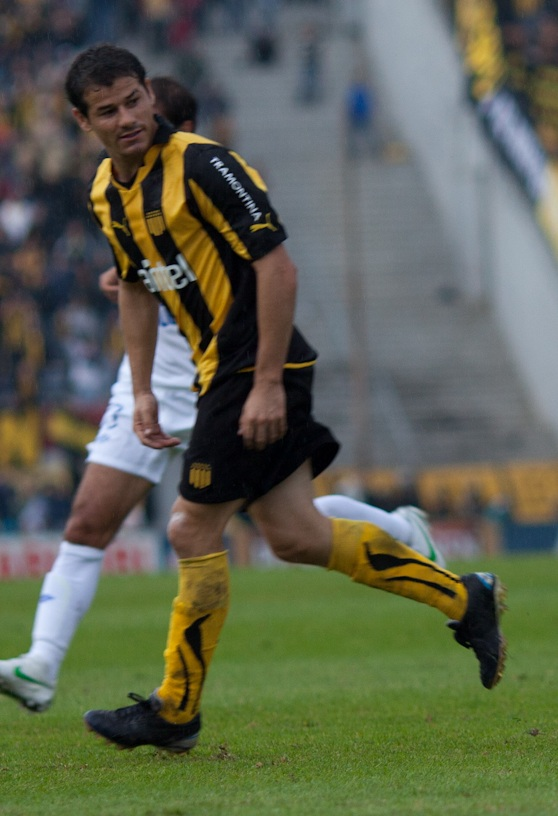
- Mora playing for Peñarol in 2012

Personal information
- Full name: Rodrigo Nicanor Mora Núñez
- Date of birth: 29 October 1987 (age 39)
- Place of birth: Rivera, Uruguay
- Height: 1.70 m (5 ft 7 in)
- Position: Striker

Team information
- Current team: Juventud Unida
- Number: 7

Youth career
- Juventud Las Piedras

Senior career*
Years	Team	Apps	(Gls)
2007–2008	Juventud Las Piedras	27	(5)
2008–2011	Defensor Sporting	39	(14)
2009–2010	→ Cerro (loan)	12	(9)
2011–2013	Benfica	1	(0)
2012	→ Peñarol (loan)	14	(10)
2012–2013	→ River Plate (loan)	30	(7)
2013–2018	River Plate	87	(20)
2014	→ Universidad de Chile (loan)	9	(1)
2023	Alas Argentinas	5	(6)
2024–2025	Juventud Unida	4	(0)
- * Club domestic league appearances and goals as of 8 May 2025

Rodrigo Nicanor Mora Núñez (born 29 October 1987) is a Uruguayan former professional footballer who played as a striker and his last club was the amateur Juventud Unida de Gualeguaychú from Uruguay. He was player and champion of the Copa Libertadores in 2015 and 2018 with River Plate until he retired due to a hip injury.

== Club career ==
Born in Rivera, Mora started his professional career with modest Juventud de Las Piedras. In 2008, aged 20, he signed for top division outfit Defensor Sporting.

After a relatively successful first season, helping La Farola finish third in the Apertura and win the Clausura, he found himself on the bench more often than not in the following, and subsequently left for fellow league outfit Cerro. At his new team he scored nine goals in 2009–10, and a further five in the campaign's Copa Libertadores, four of them in the qualifying rounds against teams in his country.

He was purchased back for the 2010–11 season, and finished the Apertura tournament with 11 goals – second-best in the competition behind Nacional's Santiago García – as his team ranked in top position. In January 2011 he signed for Benfica on a free transfer, effective as of July.

He was officially presented by the Portuguese club on 1 July, alongside Nolito. He played his first official game on 14 October in a Portuguese Cup game against Portimonense, replacing Rodrigo in the 78th minute of a 2–0 away win.

In January 2012, after failing to establish himself at Benfica, he joined Peñarol on a six-month loan. He signed on loan for River Plate in August, with the option of making the move permanent after a year. In July 2013, he signed with River Plate, in exchange for Rogelio Funes Mori. After a brief stint on loan in Club Universidad de Chile, he returned to the team mid-2014 on request of new manager Marcelo Gallardo, and was an integral part of the team that won the 2014 Copa Sudamericana, the 2015 Recopa Sudamericana and the 2015 Copa Libertadores.

As of 2017 Mora has been ridden unable to play any football due to a necrosis.

In 2023 Mora appeared on The Challenge Argentina: El Desafío.

At the end of 2023, Mora returned to the football activity playing for Alas Argentinas from Bariloche in the Torneo Regional Federal Amateur. In October 2024, he signed with Juventud Unida de Gualeguaychú.

== Honours ==
Defensor Sporting

- Uruguayan Primera División: 2009 Clausura, 2010 Apertura

River Plate

- Copa Sudamericana: 2014
- Recopa Sudamericana: 2015, 2016
- Copa Libertadores: 2015, 2018
- Suruga Bank Championship: 2015
- Copa Argentina: 2016
- Supercopa Argentina: 2017
- FIFA Club World Cup runner-up: 2015
