= Julio Chiarini =

Argentine footballer

Personal information
- Full name: Julio César Chiarini
- Date of birth: March 4, 1982 (age 44)
- Place of birth: Oliva, Córdoba, Argentina
- Height: 1.85 m (6 ft 1 in)
- Position: Goalkeeper

Senior career*
Years	Team	Apps	(Gls)
2003–2004	Cambaceres	12	(0)
2004–2006	Huracán (CR)	42	(0)
2006–2007	Guillermo Brown	7	(0)
2007–2008	Luján de Cuyo	14	(0)
2008–2009	Alumni de Villa María	30	(0)
2009–2014	Instituto	119	(0)
2014–2016	River Plate	14	(0)
2016–2017	Sarmiento	23	(0)
2017–2018	Tigre	14	(0)
2018	Instituto	7	(0)
- * Club domestic league appearances and goals

Julio César Chiarini (born 4 March 1982) is an Argentine retired football goalkeeper.

== Honours ==
Guillermo Brown de Puerto Madryn

- Torneo Argentino A: 2007

River Plate

- Copa Sudamericana: 2014
- Recopa Sudamericana: 2015
- Copa Libertadores: 2015
