= Leonel Vangioni =

Argentine footballer

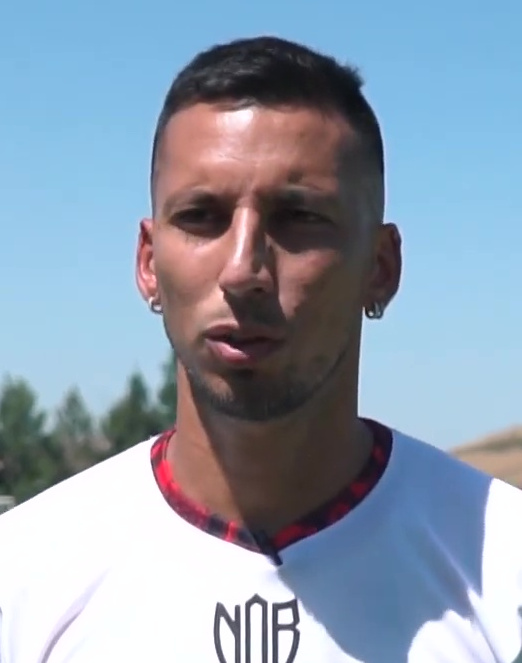
- Leonel Vangioni in 2022

Personal information
- Full name: Leonel Jesús Vangioni Rangel
- Date of birth: 5 May 1987 (age 39)
- Place of birth: Villa Constitución, Argentina
- Height: 1.81 m (5 ft 11 in)
- Position: Left-back

Team information
- Current team: Quilmes
- Number: 3

Youth career
- Newell's Old Boys

Senior career*
Years	Team	Apps	(Gls)
2006–2012	Newell's Old Boys	157	(7)
2013–2016	River Plate	92	(5)
2016–2017	AC Milan	15	(0)
2017–2020	Monterrey	79	(2)
2020–2022	Libertad	19	(0)
2022–2024	Newell's Old Boys	37	(0)
2025–	Quilmes	8	(0)

International career
2009–2014	Argentina	3	(0)
- * Club domestic league appearances and goals as of 16:13, 30 May 2025 (UTC)

Leonel Jesús Vangioni Rangel (born 5 May 1987) is an Argentine footballer who plays as a left-back for Quilmes in the Primera Nacional. He has represented the Argentina national team.

== Club career ==
His grandfather, Davide Roca, originated from Riesi in the Province of Caltanissetta, Sicily. Vangioni made his professional debut for Newell's in November 2006 and soon established himself as an important member of the first team squad. He scored his first goal in a game against San Lorenzo de Almagro on 4 August 2007. He moved to River Plate in January 2013 for a fee around €1.1 million.

On 14 February 2016, it was announced that Vangioni would be joining Italian club AC Milan on the expiration of his River contract in July. On 16 January 2017, Vangioni made his debut with Milan, coming as a substitute for Davide Calabria in a 2–2 draw against Torino.

On 21 July 2017, it was announced that he would sign for Monterrey.

=== Libertad ===
On 19 October 2020, D10 announced that Vangioni had signed with Club Libertad in the Primera División Paraguaya. Libertad officially presented Vangioni through Social Media as he arrive from Liga MX club Monterrey, where he was teammates with Paraguayan Celso Ortiz.

== International career ==
Vangioni was called up to the Argentina national team for the first time to play a friendly match against Ghana on 30 September 2009. In 2012, he took part in both legs of the Superclásico de las Américas.

== Career statistics ==
=== Club ===
As of 28 May 2017

Club	Season	League			Cup		Continental		Other		Total	
Club	Season	Division	Apps	Goals	Apps	Goals	Apps	Goals	Apps	Goals	Apps	Goals
Newell's Old Boys	2006–07	Primera División	14	0	—		—		—		14	0
Newell's Old Boys	2007–08	Primera División	26	1	—		—		—		26	1
Newell's Old Boys	2008–09	Primera División	34	5	—		—		—		34	5
Newell's Old Boys	2009–10	Primera División	31	1	—		2 (Note: Appearances in Copa Libertadores)	0	—		33	1
Newell's Old Boys	2010–11	Primera División	13	0	—		2 (Note: Appearances in Copa Sudamericana)	0	—		15	0
Newell's Old Boys	2011–12	Primera División	27	0	—		—		—		27	0
Newell's Old Boys	2012–13	Primera División	18	0	—		—		—		18	0
Newell's Old Boys	Total		163	7	—		4	0	—		167	7
River Plate	2012–13	Primera División	18	4	—		—		—		18	4
River Plate	2013–14	Primera División	35	0	1	0	6	0	—		42	0
River Plate	2014	Primera División	15	1	—		8	0	1 (Note: Appearance in Supercopa Argentina)	0	24	1
River Plate	2015	Primera División	13	0	2	0	12 (Note: 1 appearance in Copa Sudamericana, 11 appearances in Copa Libertadores)	0	4 (Note: 2 appearances in both Recopa Sudamericana and FIFA Club World Cup)	0	31	0
River Plate	2016	Primera División	9	0	—		4	0	—		13	0
River Plate	Total		90	5	3	0	30	0	5	0	128	5
Milan	2016–17	Serie A	15	0	0	0	—		0	0	15	0
Career total			268	12	3	0	34	0	5	0	310	12

=== International ===
As of 14 October 2014.

Argentina national team
Year	Apps	Goals
2009	1	0
2012	1	0
2014	1	0
Total	3	0

== Honours ==
River Plate

- Argentina Primera Division: 2014 Final
- Copa Campeonato: 2013–14
- Copa Sudamericana: 2014
- Recopa Sudamericana: 2015
- Copa Libertadores: 2015
- Suruga Bank Championship: 2015
- FIFA Club World Cup runner-up: 2015

Milan

- Supercoppa Italiana: 2016

Monterrey

- Liga MX: Apertura 2019
- Copa MX: Apertura 2017
- CONCACAF Champions League: 2019

Individual

- Liga MX Best XI: Apertura 2017
