= Leonardo Ponzio =

Argentine footballer

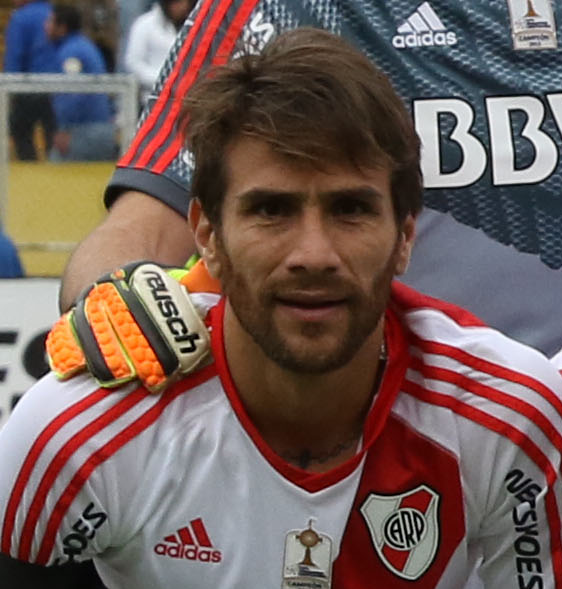
- Ponzio with River Plate in 2016

Personal information
- Full name: Leonardo Daniel Ponzio
- Date of birth: 29 January 1982 (age 44)
- Place of birth: Las Rosas, Argentina
- Height: 1.74 m (5 ft 9 in)
- Position: Defensive midfielder

Team information
- Current team: River Plate (manager)

Youth career
- Williams Kemmis
- Newell's Old Boys

Senior career*
Years	Team	Apps	(Gls)
2000–2003	Newell's Old Boys	90	(9)
2003–2006	Zaragoza	114	(5)
2007–2008	River Plate	55	(1)
2009–2012	Zaragoza	100	(6)
2012–2021	River Plate	173	(8)
Total		532	(29)

International career
2001	Argentina U20	7	(0)
2003–2013	Argentina	8	(0)

Managerial career
- 2026: River Plate (interim)
- 2026–: River Plate
- * Club domestic league appearances and goals

Leonardo Daniel Ponzio (born 29 January 1982) is an Argentine former professional footballer who played mainly as a defensive midfielder. He is currently manager of Argentine Primera División club River Plate.

After starting out at Newell's Old Boys in 2000, he went on to spend his 21-year career with Zaragoza and River Plate, appearing in 246 competitive matches with the former club and winning the 2004 Copa del Rey, adding several more accolades during his two spells with the latter and going on to be one of the most decorated players in their history.

Ponzio won the 2001 FIFA World Youth Championship with Argentina. He played games with the full team later that decade.

== Club career ==
=== Newell's and Zaragoza ===
Born in Las Rosas, Santa Fe, Ponzio started his career in the youth system of Newell's Old Boys in neighbouring Rosario. At only 21, he was signed by Real Zaragoza ahead of the 2003–04 season, for €3 million. After making his La Liga debut on 31 August 2003 in a 0–1 home loss against Deportivo de La Coruña, he went on to become an essential midfield player for the Spanish club, only missing 11 matches in three years.

Ponzio featured 69 minutes of the final of the Copa del Rey on 17 March 2004, helping to defeat Real Madrid 3–2 after extra time.

=== River Plate ===
However, when Zaragoza finished sixth in the 2006–07 campaign and qualified for the UEFA Cup, Ponzio had already left, moving in January 2007 to Club Atlético River Plate. He scored his first goal for his new team in the 2007 edition of the Copa Libertadores, against Chile's Colo-Colo.

=== Zaragoza return ===
In January 2009, Ponzio returned to Zaragoza signing a four-and-a-half-year contract, with the side now in the Segunda División. He contributed regularly as they returned to the top flight immediately.

Ponzio was ever-present in 2009–10, inclusively featuring at right and left-back, while collecting 15 yellow cards. He scored his only goal of the season on 3 April 2010, striking from long range in a 2–0 home win over Málaga CF.

=== Return to River ===
On 4 January 2012, aged 30, Ponzio, whose link in Aragon ran until June, left struggling – in sporting and financial terms – Zaragoza. He then returned to River Plate for personal reasons, agreeing to a three-and-a-half-year deal.

On 18 December 2021, Ponzio became River's player with the most titles in history at 17, surpassing Ángel Labruna. A longtime captain, he was nicknamed Capitán Eterno (Eternal Captain) after his retirement.

== International career ==
Ponzio represented Argentina at under-17 and under-20 levels, and earned his first full cap in a friendly against Honduras on 31 January 2003. In 2001, he played all seven matches (five complete) as the national team won the FIFA U-20 World Cup on home soil.

== Coaching career ==
On 27 August 2026, following Eduardo Coudet's dismissal, Ponzio was named River's caretaker manager. He oversaw a 3–2 victory at Club Atlético Banfield on his debut, and signed a permanent one-year contract on 17 September due to administrative reasons; his status would be further evaluated at the end of this period.

== Career statistics ==
As of match played 16 May 2021

Club	Div.	Season	League			National Cup^{(1)}			Continental^{(2)}			Total
Club	Div.	Season	Apps	Goals	Assists	Apps	Goals	Assists	Apps	Goals	Assists	Apps	Goals	Assists
Newell's Old Boys
Newell's Old Boys	Primera División	1999–00	1	0	0	-	-	-	-	-	-	1	0	0
Newell's Old Boys	Primera División	2000–01	26	0	1	-	-	-	-	-	-	26	0	1
Newell's Old Boys	Primera División	2001–02	33	5	3	-	-	-	-	-	-	33	5	3
Newell's Old Boys	Primera División	2002–03	30	4	2	-	-	-	-	-	-	30	4	2
Newell's total			90	9	6	-	-	-	-	-	-	90	9	6
Zaragoza
Zaragoza	La Liga	2003–04	35	3	1	8	0	0	-	-	-	43	3	1
Zaragoza	La Liga	2004–05	33	1	2	1	0	0	8	0	0	42	1	2
Zaragoza	La Liga	2005–06	35	1	0	9	0	1	-	-	-	44	1	1
Zaragoza	La Liga	2006–07	11	0	0	2	0	0	-	-	-	13	0	0
Zaragoza	Total		114	5	5	20	0	1	8	0	0	142	5	6
River Plate
River Plate	Primera División	2006–07	14	1	0	-	-	-	6	1	0	20	2	0
River Plate	Primera División	2007–08	29	0	4	-	-	-	8	0	0	37	0	4
River Plate	Primera División	2008–09	12	0	0	-	-	-	2	0	0	14	0	0
River Plate	Total		55	1	4	-	-	-	16	1	0	71	2	4
Zaragoza
Zaragoza	Segunda División	2008–09	18	2	1	-	-	-	-	-	-	18	2	1
Zaragoza	La Liga	2009–10	34	1	2	2	0	0	-	-	-	36	1	2
Zaragoza	La Liga	2010–11	32	2	1	1	0	0	-	-	-	33	2	1
Zaragoza	La Liga	2011–12	16	1	1	1	0	0	-	-	-	17	1	1
Zaragoza	Total		100	6	5	4	0	0	0	0	0	104	6	5
Zaragoza total			214	11	8	24	0	1	8	0	0	246	11	9
River Plate
River Plate	Primera Nacional	2011–12	19	1	0	1	0	0	-	-	-	20	1	0
River Plate	Primera División	2012–13	29	4	6	-	-	-	-	-	-	29	4	6
River Plate	Primera División	2013–14	19	1	3	2	0	0	6	0	0	27	1	3
River Plate	Primera División	2014	10	0	1	-	-	-	8	0	0	18	0	1
River Plate	Primera División	2015	17	1	0	1	0	0	15	0	0	33	1	0
River Plate	Primera División	2016	13	0	1	-	-	-	4	0	1	17	0	2
River Plate	Primera División	2016–17	24	0	0	7	0	0	5	0	0	36	0	0
River Plate	Primera División	2017–18	17	1	0	7	0	0	12	0	1	36	1	1
River Plate	Primera División	2018–19	14	0	0	7	0	0	11	0	0	32	0	0
River Plate	Primera División	2019–20	4	0	0	3	0	0	5	0	0	12	0	0
River Plate	Primera División	2020	—			7	0	0	4	0	0	11	0	0
River Plate	Primera División	2021	0	0	0	8	0	0	4	0	0	12	0	0
River Plate	Total		166	7	11	43	0	0	74	0	2	283	8	13
River total			221	9	17	43	0	1	90	1	2	354	10	17
Career total			525	29	31	67	0	1	96	1	2	690	30	34

^{(1)}National Cup refers to Copa Argentina, Copa del Rey, Supercopa Argentina, Copa Superliga and Copa Diego Armando Maradona ^{(2)}Continental refers to UEFA Europa League, Copa Libertadores, Copa Sudamericana, Recopa Sudamericana, FIFA Club World Cup and Suruga Bank Championship

== Managerial statistics ==
As of 5 November 2026

Managerial record by team and tenure
Team	Nat	From	To	Record							
Team	Nat	From	To	G	W	D	L	GF	GA	GD	Win %
River Plate	(Argentina)	27 August 2026	present	10	7	1	2	17	8	+9	70.00
Total				10	7	1	2	17	8	+9	70.00

== Honours ==
Zaragoza

- Copa del Rey: 2003–04

River Plate

- Argentine Primera División: Clausura 2008, Torneo Final 2014, Superfinal 2014, Campeonato 2021
- Copa Argentina: 2015–16, 2016–17, 2018–19
- Supercopa Argentina: 2017, 2019
- Copa Libertadores: 2015, 2018; runner-up: 2019
- Copa Sudamericana: 2014
- Recopa Sudamericana: 2015, 2016, 2019
- Suruga Bank Championship: 2015
- Primera B Nacional: 2011–12
- FIFA Club World Cup runner-up: 2015

Argentina U20

- FIFA U-20 World Cup: 2001
