= 2014 Copa Libertadores finals =

2014 Copa Libertadores de América finals
- Event: 2014 Copa Libertadores
Nacional	San Lorenzo
(Paraguay)	(Argentina)
1	2
- on aggregate

First leg
Nacional	San Lorenzo
1	1
- Date: 6 August 2014
- Venue: Estadio Defensores del Chaco, Asunción
- Referee: Wilmar Roldán (Colombia)

Second leg
San Lorenzo	Nacional
1	0
- Date: 13 August 2014
- Venue: Estadio Pedro Bidegain, Buenos Aires
- Referee: Sandro Ricci (Brazil)

The 2014 Copa Libertadores de América finals was a two-legged final that decided the winner of the 2014 Copa Libertadores de América, the 55th edition of the Copa Libertadores de América, South America's premier international club football tournament organized by CONMEBOL.

The finals was contested in two-legged home-and-away format between Paraguayan team Nacional and Argentine team San Lorenzo. The first leg was hosted by Nacional at Estadio Defensores del Chaco in Asunción on 6 August, while the second leg was hosted by San Lorenzo at Estadio Pedro Bidegain in Buenos Aires on 13 August 2014. The winner earned the right to represent CONMEBOL at the 2014 FIFA Club World Cup, entering at the semifinal stage, and the right to play against the 2014 Copa Sudamericana winners in the 2015 Recopa Sudamericana.

The first leg ended in a 1–1 draw. The second led ended with a 1–0 win for San Lorenzo, and they won the tournament for the first time in their history.

== Qualified teams ==
Team	Previous finals app.
(Paraguay) Nacional	None
(Argentina) San Lorenzo	None

Both teams came into the finals as first-time finalists of the Copa Libertadores. San Lorenzo had previously won two CONMEBOL titles: the 2001 Copa Mercosur and the 2002 Copa Sudamericana.

== Venues ==
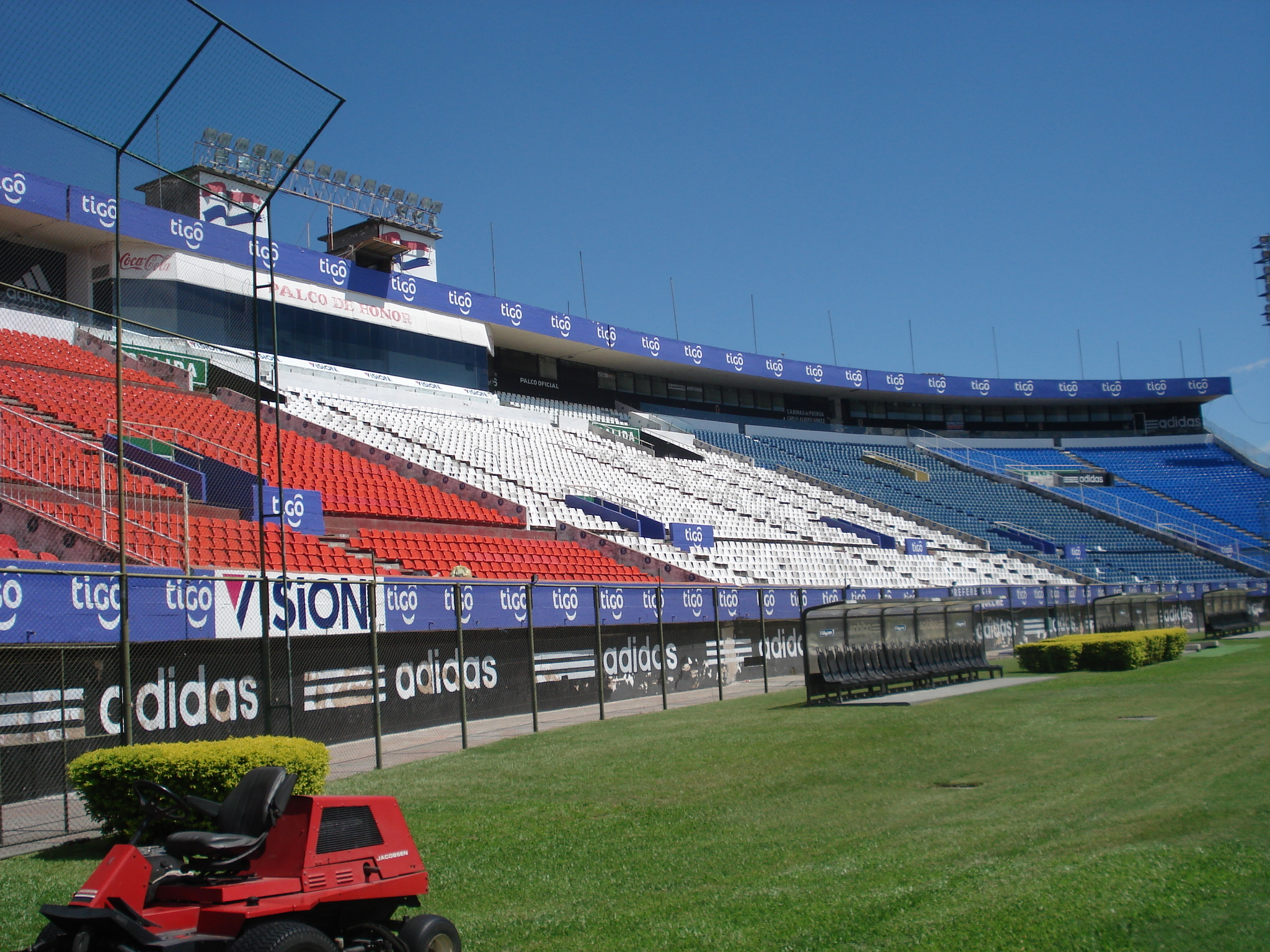
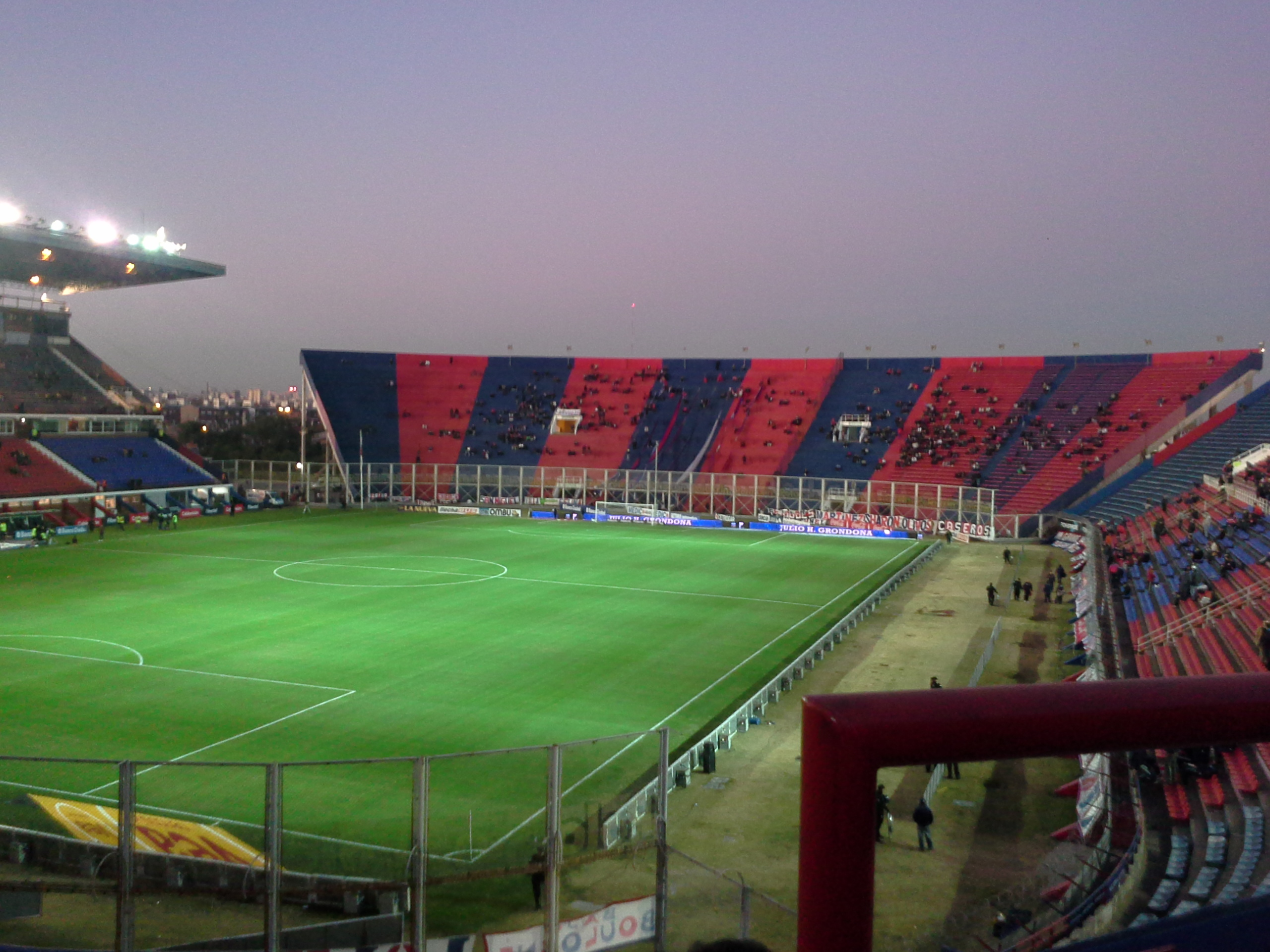
Estadio Defensores del Chaco (left) and Estadio Pedro Bidegain, venues for the series

=== Road to the finals ===
Note: In all scores below, the score of the home team is given first.

(Paraguay) Nacional			Round	(Argentina) San Lorenzo		
Opponent	Venue	Score		Opponent	Venue	Score
Bye			First stage	Bye		
Group 4			Second stage	Group 2		
(Colombia) Santa Fe	Away	3–1	Second stage	(Brazil) Botafogo	Away	2–0
(Venezuela) Zamora	Home	1–0	Second stage	(Ecuador) Independiente del Valle	Home	1–0
(Brazil) Atlético Mineiro	Home	2–2	Second stage	(Chile) Unión Española	Home	1–1
(Brazil) Atlético Mineiro	Away	1–1	Second stage	(Chile) Unión Española	Away	1–0
(Venezuela) Zamora	Away	2–0	Second stage	(Ecuador) Independiente del Valle	Away	1–1
(Colombia) Santa Fe	Home	3–2	Second stage	(Brazil) Botafogo	Home	3–0
Pos / Team / Pld / W / D / L / GF / GA / GD / Pts; 1 / (Brazil) Atlético Mineiro / 6 / 3 / 3 / 0 / 8 / 5 / +3 / 12; 2 / (Paraguay) Nacional / 6 / 2 / 2 / 2 / 8 / 10 / −2 / 8; 3 / (Venezuela) Zamora / 6 / 2 / 1 / 3 / 6 / 6 / 0 / 7; 4 / (Colombia) Santa Fe / 6 / 1 / 2 / 3 / 10 / 11 / −1 / 5; Source:			Second stage	Pos / Team / Pld / W / D / L / GF / GA / GD / Pts; 1 / (Chile) Unión Española / 6 / 2 / 3 / 1 / 10 / 9 / +1 / 9; 2 / (Argentina) San Lorenzo / 6 / 2 / 2 / 2 / 6 / 5 / +1 / 8; 3 / (Ecuador) Independiente del Valle / 6 / 2 / 2 / 2 / 10 / 10 / 0 / 8; 4 / (Brazil) Botafogo / 6 / 2 / 1 / 3 / 5 / 7 / −2 / 7; Source:		
Seed 16			Knockout stages	Seed 15		
(Argentina) Vélez Sarsfield (won 3–2 on aggregate)	Home	1–0	Round of 16	(Brazil) Grêmio (tied 1–1 on aggregate, won on penalties)	Home	1–0
(Argentina) Vélez Sarsfield (won 3–2 on aggregate)	Away	2–2	Round of 16	(Brazil) Grêmio (tied 1–1 on aggregate, won on penalties)	Away	1–0 (2–4 p)
(Argentina) Arsenal (won 1–0 on aggregate)	Home	1–0	Quarterfinals	(Brazil) Cruzeiro (won 2–1 on aggregate)	Home	1–0
(Argentina) Arsenal (won 1–0 on aggregate)	Away	0–0	Quarterfinals	(Brazil) Cruzeiro (won 2–1 on aggregate)	Away	1–1
(Uruguay) Defensor Sporting (won 2–1 on aggregate)	Home	2–0	Semifinals	(Bolivia) Bolívar (won 5–1 on aggregate)	Home	5–0
(Uruguay) Defensor Sporting (won 2–1 on aggregate)	Away	1–0	Semifinals	(Bolivia) Bolívar (won 5–1 on aggregate)	Away	1–0

== Format ==
The finals were played on a home-and-away two-legged basis, with the higher-seeded team hosting the second leg. If tied on aggregate, 30 minutes of extra time were played. If still tied after extra time, a penalty shoot-out was used to determine the winner.

== Match details ==
=== First leg ===
San Lorenzo took the lead in the first leg when Mauro Matos volleyed the ball right footed into the left of the net after a cross from the right. Julio Santa Cruz got the equalizer in the 93rd minute of the match when he turned the ball home high to the net from six yards out with his right foot after a cross from the left was headed onto him.

6 August 2014
20:15 UTC−4
First leg

Nacional (Paraguay)	1–1	(Argentina) San Lorenzo
Santa Cruz 90+2'	Report	Matos 64'

Estadio Defensores del Chaco, Asunción
Attendance: 36,000
Referee: Wilmar Roldán (Colombia)

Nacional	San Lorenzo

GK	1	(Argentina) Ignacio Don
DF	12	(Paraguay) Ramón Coronel	(substituted off) 70'
DF	15	(Paraguay) Raúl Piris (c)
DF	3	(Paraguay) José Cáceres
DF	4	(Paraguay) David Mendoza
MF	8	(Paraguay) Juan Argüello
MF	6	(Paraguay) Silvio Torales
MF	18	(Paraguay) Derlis Orué	(substituted off) 70'
MF	14	(Paraguay) Marcos Melgarejo
FW	7	(Paraguay) Julián Benítez	(substituted off) 62'
FW	16	(Paraguay) Fredy Bareiro
Substitutes:
GK	25	(Paraguay) Oscar Agüero
DF	23	(Paraguay) Fabián Balbuena
DF	5	(Paraguay) Marcos Miers
MF	10	(Paraguay) Hugo Lusardi	(substituted on) 70'
FW	11	(Paraguay) Marco Prieto
FW	19	(Paraguay) Cecilio Domínguez	(substituted on) 62'
FW	29	(Paraguay) Julio Santa Cruz	(substituted on) 70'
Manager:
(Paraguay) Gustavo Morínigo

GK	12	(Argentina) Sebastián Torrico
DF	7	(Argentina) Julio Buffarini
DF	29	(Argentina) Fabricio Fontanini
DF	6	(Argentina) Santiago Gentiletti
DF	21	(Argentina) Emmanuel Más
MF	15	(Argentina) Héctor Villalba	(substituted off) 70'
MF	5	(Argentina) Juan Mercier
MF	20	(Paraguay) Néstor Ortigoza	(substituted off) 85'
MF	28	(Argentina) Ignacio Piatti
MF	10	(Argentina) Leandro Romagnoli (c)	(substituted off) 76'
FW	26	(Argentina) Mauro Matos
Substitutes:
GK	1	(Argentina) Cristian Álvarez
DF	14	(Argentina) Walter Kannemann
DF	4	(Argentina) Gonzalo Prósperi
MF	8	(Argentina) Enzo Kalinski	(substituted on) 85'
MF	11	(Argentina) Pablo Barrientos	(substituted on) 76'
MF	16	(Argentina) Gonzalo Verón	(substituted on) 70'
FW	9	(Uruguay) Martín Cauteruccio
Manager:
(Argentina) Edgardo Bauza

Assistant referees:
Wilmar Navarro (Colombia)
Wilson Berrio (Colombia)
Fourth official:
Wilson Lamouroux (Colombia)

=== Second leg ===
Néstor Ortigoza scored the only goal of the game, a penalty after a shot from Martín Cauteruccio struck the right hand of Ramón Coronel. Ortigoza hit the ball right footed to the left of the goalkeeper who dived the other way.

13 August 2014
21:15 UTC−3
Second leg

San Lorenzo (Argentina)	1–0	(Paraguay) Nacional
Ortigoza 35' (pen.)	Report

Estadio Pedro Bidegain, Buenos Aires
Attendance: 44,000
Referee: Sandro Ricci (Brazil)

San Lorenzo	Nacional

GK	12	(Argentina) Sebastián Torrico
DF	7	(Argentina) Julio Buffarini
DF	2	(Argentina) Mauro Cetto
DF	6	(Argentina) Santiago Gentiletti
DF	21	(Argentina) Emmanuel Más
MF	15	(Argentina) Héctor Villalba		(substituted off) 81'
MF	20	(Paraguay) Néstor Ortigoza
MF	5	(Argentina) Juan Mercier	(yellow card) 30'
MF	10	(Argentina) Leandro Romagnoli (c)		(substituted off) 87'
FW	9	(Uruguay) Martín Cauteruccio		(substituted off) 65'
FW	26	(Argentina) Mauro Matos
Substitutes:
GK	1	(Argentina) Cristian Álvarez
DF	29	(Argentina) Fabricio Fontanini
DF	14	(Argentina) Walter Kannemann		(substituted on) 87'
MF	11	(Argentina) Pablo Barrientos
MF	8	(Argentina) Enzo Kalinski		(substituted on) 81'
MF	16	(Argentina) Gonzalo Verón		(substituted on) 65'
FW	22	(Argentina) Nicolás Blandi
Manager:
(Argentina) Edgardo Bauza

GK	1	(Argentina) Ignacio Don
DF	12	(Paraguay) Ramón Coronel	(yellow card) 35'
DF	15	(Paraguay) Raúl Piris (c)
DF	3	(Paraguay) José Cáceres
DF	4	(Paraguay) David Mendoza	(yellow card) 90+2'
MF	14	(Paraguay) Marcos Melgarejo		(substituted off) 86'
MF	28	(Paraguay) Marcos Riveros
MF	6	(Paraguay) Silvio Torales
MF	18	(Paraguay) Derlis Orué		(substituted off) 56'
FW	7	(Paraguay) Julián Benítez	(yellow card) 69'	(substituted off) 84'
FW	16	(Paraguay) Fredy Bareiro
Substitutes:
GK	25	(Paraguay) Oscar Agüero
DF	23	(Paraguay) Fabián Balbuena
MF	10	(Paraguay) Hugo Lusardi		(substituted on) 86'
MF	8	(Paraguay) Juan Argüello
FW	26	(Paraguay) Brian Montenegro		(substituted on) 56'
FW	19	(Paraguay) Cecilio Domínguez
FW	29	(Paraguay) Julio Santa Cruz		(substituted on) 84'
Manager:
(Paraguay) Gustavo Morínigo

Assistant referees:
Emerson de Carvalho (Brazil)
Marcelo Van Gasse (Brazil)
Fourth official:
Péricles Cortez (Brazil)

== See also ==
- 2015 Recopa Sudamericana
