= 2014 Copa Libertadores knockout stage =

The knockout stages of the 2014 Copa Libertadores de América were played from April 16 to August 13, 2014. A total of 16 teams competed in the knockout stages.

== Qualified teams ==
The winners and runners-up of each of the eight groups in the second stage qualified for the knockout stages.

Group	Winners	Runners-up
1	(Argentina) Vélez Sarsfield	(Bolivia) The Strongest
2	(Chile) Unión Española	(Argentina) San Lorenzo
3	(Paraguay) Cerro Porteño	(Argentina) Lanús
4	(Brazil) Atlético Mineiro	(Paraguay) Nacional
5	(Uruguay) Defensor Sporting	(Brazil) Cruzeiro
6	(Brazil) Grêmio	(Colombia) Atlético Nacional
7	(Bolivia) Bolívar	(Mexico) León
8	(Mexico) Santos Laguna	(Argentina) Arsenal

== Seeding ==
The qualified teams were seeded in the knockout stages according to their results in the second stage, with the group winners seeded 1–8, and the group runners-up seeded 9–16.

Seed	Team	Pld	W	D	L	GF	GA	GD	Pts	Status
1	(Argentina) Vélez Sarsfield	6	5	0	1	9	3	+6	15	Group winners (Seeds 1–8)
2	(Brazil) Grêmio	6	4	2	0	8	1	+7	14	Group winners (Seeds 1–8)
3	(Mexico) Santos Laguna	6	4	1	1	11	5	+6	13	Group winners (Seeds 1–8)
4	(Brazil) Atlético Mineiro	6	3	3	0	8	5	+3	12	Group winners (Seeds 1–8)
5	(Uruguay) Defensor Sporting	6	3	2	1	11	5	+6	11	Group winners (Seeds 1–8)
6	(Bolivia) Bolívar	6	3	2	1	8	6	+2	11	Group winners (Seeds 1–8)
7	(Paraguay) Cerro Porteño	6	3	1	2	10	9	+1	10	Group winners (Seeds 1–8)
8	(Chile) Unión Española	6	2	3	1	10	9	+1	9	Group winners (Seeds 1–8)
9	(Argentina) Arsenal	6	4	0	2	11	4	+7	12	Group runners-up (Seeds 9–16)
10	(Brazil) Cruzeiro	6	3	1	2	13	7	+6	10	Group runners-up (Seeds 9–16)
11	(Mexico) León	6	3	1	2	10	7	+3	10	Group runners-up (Seeds 9–16)
12	(Bolivia) The Strongest	6	3	1	2	8	7	+1	10	Group runners-up (Seeds 9–16)
13	(Colombia) Atlético Nacional	6	3	1	2	7	8	−1	10	Group runners-up (Seeds 9–16)
14	(Argentina) Lanús	6	2	2	2	6	5	+1	8	Group runners-up (Seeds 9–16)
15	(Argentina) San Lorenzo	6	2	2	2	6	5	+1	8	Group runners-up (Seeds 9–16)
16	(Paraguay) Nacional	6	2	2	2	8	10	−2	8	Group runners-up (Seeds 9–16)

Rules for classification: 1. Higher position in group; 2. Points; 3. Goal difference; 4. Goals scored; 5. Away goals scored; 6. Drawing of lots.

== Format ==
In the knockout stages, the 16 teams played a single-elimination tournament, with the following rules:

- Each tie was played on a home-and-away two-legged basis, with the higher-seeded team hosting the second leg. However, CONMEBOL required that the second leg of the finals must be played in South America, i.e., a finalist from Mexico had to host the first leg regardless of seeding.
- In the round of 16, quarterfinals, and semifinals, if tied on aggregate, the away goals rule was used. If still tied, a penalty shoot-out was used to determine the winner (no extra time was played).
- In the finals, if tied on aggregate, the away goals rule was not used, and 30 minutes of extra time were played. If still tied after extra time, a penalty shoot-out was used to determine the winner.
- If there were two semifinalists from the same association, they had to play each other.

== Bracket ==
The bracket of the knockout stages was determined by the seeding as follows:

- Round of 16:
  - Match A: Seed 1 vs. Seed 16
  - Match B: Seed 2 vs. Seed 15
  - Match C: Seed 3 vs. Seed 14
  - Match D: Seed 4 vs. Seed 13
  - Match E: Seed 5 vs. Seed 12
  - Match F: Seed 6 vs. Seed 11
  - Match G: Seed 7 vs. Seed 10
  - Match H: Seed 8 vs. Seed 9
- Quarterfinals:
  - Match S1: Winner A vs. Winner H
  - Match S2: Winner B vs. Winner G
  - Match S3: Winner C vs. Winner F
  - Match S4: Winner D vs. Winner E
- Semifinals: (if there were two semifinalists from the same association, they must play each other)
  - Match F1: Winner S1 vs. Winner S4
  - Match F2: Winner S2 vs. Winner S3
- Finals: Winner F1 vs. Winner F2

Round of 16
16	(Paraguay) Nacional	1	2	3
1	(Argentina) Vélez Sarsfield	0	2	2
9	(Argentina) Arsenal	0	1	1
8	(Chile) Unión Española	0	0	0
13	(Colombia) Atlético Nacional	1	1	2
4	(Brazil) Atlético Mineiro	0	1	1
12	(Bolivia) The Strongest	2	0	2 (2)
5	(Uruguay) Defensor Sporting (p)	0	2	2 (4)
15	(Argentina) San Lorenzo (p)	1	0	1 (4)
2	(Brazil) Grêmio	0	1	1 (2)
10	(Brazil) Cruzeiro	1	2	3
7	(Paraguay) Cerro Porteño	1	0	1
14	(Argentina) Lanús	2	2	4
3	(Mexico) Santos Laguna	1	0	1
11	(Mexico) León	2	1	3
6	(Bolivia) Bolívar (a)	2	1	3

Quarterfinals
16	(Paraguay) Nacional	1	0	1
9	(Argentina) Arsenal	0	0	0
13	(Colombia) Atlético Nacional	0	0	0
5	(Uruguay) Defensor Sporting	2	1	3
15	(Argentina) San Lorenzo	1	1	2
10	(Brazil) Cruzeiro	0	1	1
14	(Argentina) Lanús	1	0	1
6	(Bolivia) Bolívar	1	1	2

Semifinals
16	(Paraguay) Nacional	2	0	2
5	(Uruguay) Defensor Sporting	0	1	1
15	(Argentina) San Lorenzo	5	0	5
6	(Bolivia) Bolívar	0	1	1

Finals
16	(Paraguay) Nacional	1	0	1
15	(Argentina) San Lorenzo	1	1	2

== Round of 16 ==
The first legs were played on April 16–17 and 23–24, and the second legs were played on April 22–23, 29–30, and May 1, 2014.

Team 1	Agg.	Team 2	1st leg	2nd leg
Nacional (Paraguay)	3–2	(Argentina) Vélez Sarsfield	1–0	2–2
San Lorenzo (Argentina)	1–1 (4–2 p)	(Brazil) Grêmio	1–0	0–1
Lanús (Argentina)	4–1	(Mexico) Santos Laguna	2–1	2–0
Atlético Nacional (Colombia)	2–1	(Brazil) Atlético Mineiro	1–0	1–1
The Strongest (Bolivia)	2–2 (2–4 p)	(Uruguay) Defensor Sporting	2–0	0–2
León (Mexico)	3–3 (a)	(Bolivia) Bolívar	2–2	1–1
Cruzeiro (Brazil)	3–1	(Paraguay) Cerro Porteño	1–1	2–0
Arsenal (Argentina)	1–0	(Chile) Unión Española	0–0	1–0

=== Match A ===
April 23, 2014
18:45 UTC−4

Nacional (Paraguay)	1–0	(Argentina) Vélez Sarsfield
J. Benítez 86'	Report

Estadio Defensores del Chaco, Asunción
Referee: Héber Lopes (Brazil)

April 29, 2014
21:45 UTC−3

Vélez Sarsfield (Argentina)	2–2	(Paraguay) Nacional
J. Correa 74', 84'	Report	Torales 78' (pen.); Orué 90+3'

Estadio José Amalfitani, Buenos Aires
Referee: Sandro Ricci (Brazil)

Nacional won 3–2 on aggregate.

=== Match B ===
April 23, 2014
22:00 UTC−3

San Lorenzo (Argentina)	1–0	(Brazil) Grêmio
Á. Correa 51'	Report

Estadio Pedro Bidegain, Buenos Aires
Referee: Enrique Osses (Chile)

April 30, 2014
22:00 UTC−3

Grêmio (Brazil)	1–0	(Argentina) San Lorenzo
Dudu 83'	Report
Penalties
Barcos (penalty missed); C. Riveros (penalty scored); M. Rodríguez (penalty missed); Rodriguinho (penalty scored)	2–4	(penalty scored) Ortigoza; (penalty scored) Matos; (penalty scored) Blandi; (penalty scored) Buffarini

Arena do Grêmio, Porto Alegre
Referee: Roberto Silvera (Uruguay)

Tied 1–1 on aggregate, San Lorenzo won on penalties.

=== Match C ===
April 16, 2014
19:45 UTC−3

Lanús (Argentina)	2–1	(Mexico) Santos Laguna
Monteseirín 65'; M. Martínez 90+4'	Report	Quintero 57'

Estadio Ciudad de Lanús, Lanús
Referee: Patricio Polic (Chile)

April 23, 2014
22:10 UTC−5

Santos Laguna (Mexico)	0–2	(Argentina) Lanús
	Report	Blanco 28'; Goltz 50' (pen.)

Estadio Corona, Torreón
Referee: Darío Ubriaco (Uruguay)

Lanús won 4–1 on aggregate.

=== Match D ===
April 23, 2014
20:00 UTC−5

Atlético Nacional (Colombia)	1–0	(Brazil) Atlético Mineiro
Cárdenas 90+1'	Report

Estadio Atanasio Girardot, Medellín
Referee: Martín Vázquez (Uruguay)

May 1, 2014
19:15 UTC−3

Atlético Mineiro (Brazil)	1–1	(Colombia) Atlético Nacional
Fernandinho 20'	Report	Duque 87'

Estádio Independência, Belo Horizonte
Referee: Patricio Loustau (Argentina)

Atlético Nacional won 2–1 on aggregate.

=== Match E ===
April 17, 2014
20:15 UTC−4

The Strongest (Bolivia)	2–0	(Uruguay) Defensor Sporting
Reinoso 68'; R. Castro 77'	Report

Estadio Hernando Siles, La Paz
Referee: Marcelo Henrique (Brazil)

April 29, 2014
19:15 UTC−3

Defensor Sporting (Uruguay)	2–0	(Bolivia) The Strongest
De Arrascaeta 59'; Olivera 64'	Report
Penalties
M. Alonso (penalty scored); Malvino (penalty scored); Fleurquin (penalty missed); Luna (penalty scored); Olivera (penalty scored)	4–2	(penalty missed) Cristaldo; (penalty missed) Barrera; (penalty scored) Alfaro; (penalty scored) R. Castro

Estadio Luis Franzini, Montevideo
Referee: Antonio Arias (Paraguay)

Tied 2–2 on aggregate, Defensor Sporting won on penalties.

=== Match F ===
April 16, 2014
20:00 UTC−5

León (Mexico)	2–2	(Bolivia) Bolívar
Montes 20'; Boselli 85'	Report	Callejón 44'; Arce 70'

Estadio León, León
Referee: Carlos Amarilla (Paraguay)

April 22, 2014
20:15 UTC−4

Bolívar (Bolivia)	1–1	(Mexico) León
Eguino 35'	Report	Arizala 5'

Estadio Hernando Siles, La Paz
Referee: Adrián Vélez (Colombia)

Tied 3–3 on aggregate, Bolívar won on away goals.

=== Match G ===
April 16, 2014
22:00 UTC−3

Cruzeiro (Brazil)	1–1	(Paraguay) Cerro Porteño
Samudio 90+3'	Report	Á. Romero 31'

Mineirão, Belo Horizonte
Referee: Daniel Fedorczuk (Uruguay)

April 30, 2014
21:00 UTC−4

Cerro Porteño (Paraguay)	0–2	(Brazil) Cruzeiro
	Report	Dedé 79'; Dagoberto 90+3'

Estadio General Pablo Rojas, Asunción
Referee: Darío Ubriaco (Uruguay)

Cruzeiro won 3–1 on aggregate.

=== Match H ===
April 24, 2014
21:15 UTC−3

Arsenal (Argentina)	0–0	(Chile) Unión Española
	Report

Estadio Julio Humberto Grondona, Sarandí
Referee: Víctor Carrillo (Peru)

April 30, 2014
18:30 UTC−4

Unión Española (Chile)	0–1	(Argentina) Arsenal
	Report	Braghieri 66'

Estadio Santa Laura-Universidad SEK, Independencia
Referee: Ricardo Marques (Brazil)

Arsenal won 1–0 on aggregate.

== Quarterfinals ==
The first legs were played on May 7–8, and the second legs were played on May 14–15, 2014.

Team 1	Agg.	Team 2	1st leg	2nd leg
Nacional (Paraguay)	1–0	(Argentina) Arsenal	1–0	0–0
San Lorenzo (Argentina)	2–1	(Brazil) Cruzeiro	1–0	1–1
Lanús (Argentina)	1–2	(Bolivia) Bolívar	1–1	0–1
Atlético Nacional (Colombia)	0–3	(Uruguay) Defensor Sporting	0–2	0–1

=== Match S1 ===
May 7, 2014
18:45 UTC−4

Nacional (Paraguay)	1–0	(Argentina) Arsenal
Orué 35'	Report

Estadio Defensores del Chaco, Asunción
Referee: Wilmar Roldán (Colombia)

May 14, 2014
19:30 UTC−3

Arsenal (Argentina)	0–0	(Paraguay) Nacional
	Report

Estadio Julio Humberto Grondona, Sarandí
Referee: Leandro Vuaden (Brazil)

Nacional won 1–0 on aggregate.

=== Match S2 ===
May 7, 2014
22:00 UTC−3

San Lorenzo (Argentina)	1–0	(Brazil) Cruzeiro
Gentiletti 64'	Report

Estadio Pedro Bidegain, Buenos Aires
Referee: Antonio Arias (Paraguay)

May 14, 2014
22:00 UTC−3

Cruzeiro (Brazil)	1–1	(Argentina) San Lorenzo
Bruno Rodrigo 70'	Report	Piatti 9'

Mineirão, Belo Horizonte
Referee: Martín Vázquez (Uruguay)

San Lorenzo won 2–1 on aggregate.

=== Match S3 ===
May 8, 2014
19:45 UTC−3

Lanús (Argentina)	1–1	(Bolivia) Bolívar
O. Benítez 7'	Report	W. Ferreira 90+1'

Estadio Ciudad de Lanús, Lanús
Referee: Víctor Carrillo (Peru)

May 15, 2014
18:30 UTC−4

Bolívar (Bolivia)	1–0	(Argentina) Lanús
Arce 87'	Report

Estadio Hernando Siles, La Paz
Referee: Roddy Zambrano (Ecuador)

Bolívar won 2–1 on aggregate.

=== Match S4 ===
May 8, 2014
20:00 UTC−5

Atlético Nacional (Colombia)	0–2	(Uruguay) Defensor Sporting
	Report	Pais 77'; Olivera 82'

Estadio Atanasio Girardot, Medellín
Referee: Néstor Pitana (Argentina)

May 15, 2014
22:00 UTC−3

Defensor Sporting (Uruguay)	1–0	(Colombia) Atlético Nacional
Olivera 88'	Report

Estadio Centenario, Montevideo
Referee: Enrique Osses (Chile)

Defensor Sporting won 3–0 on aggregate.

== Semifinals ==
The first legs were played on July 22–23, and the second legs were played on July 29–30, 2014.

Team 1	Agg.	Team 2	1st leg	2nd leg
Nacional (Paraguay)	2–1	(Uruguay) Defensor Sporting	2–0	0–1
San Lorenzo (Argentina)	5–1	(Bolivia) Bolívar	5–0	0–1

=== Match F1 ===
July 22, 2014
20:15 UTC−4

Nacional (Paraguay)	2–0	(Uruguay) Defensor Sporting
Montenegro 35'; Orué 69'	Report

Estadio Defensores del Chaco, Asunción
Referee: Víctor Carrillo (Peru)

July 29, 2014
21:15 UTC−3

Defensor Sporting (Uruguay)	1–0	(Paraguay) Nacional
Luna 55'	Report

Estadio Centenario, Montevideo
Referee: Ricardo Marques (Brazil)

Nacional won 2–1 on aggregate.

=== Match F2 ===
July 23, 2014
19:45 UTC−3

San Lorenzo (Argentina)	5–0	(Bolivia) Bolívar
Matos 5'; Más 27', 87'; Mercier 69'; Buffarini 73'	Report

Estadio Pedro Bidegain, Buenos Aires
Referee: Hernando Buitrago (Colombia)

July 30, 2014
20:15 UTC−4

Bolívar (Bolivia)	1–0	(Argentina) San Lorenzo
Yecerotte 90+1'	Report

Estadio Hernando Siles, La Paz
Referee: Carlos Vera (Ecuador)

San Lorenzo won 5–1 on aggregate.

== Finals ==
The finals were played on a home-and-away two-legged basis, with the higher-seeded team hosting the second leg. If tied on aggregate, the away goals rule was not used, and 30 minutes of extra time were played. If still tied after extra time, a penalty shoot-out was used to determine the winner.

The first leg was played on August 6, and the second leg was played on August 13, 2014.

August 6, 2014
20:15 UTC−4

Nacional (Paraguay)	1–1	(Argentina) San Lorenzo
Santa Cruz 90+2'	Report	Matos 64'

Estadio Defensores del Chaco, Asunción
Referee: Wilmar Roldán (Colombia)

August 13, 2014
21:15 UTC−3

San Lorenzo (Argentina)	1–0	(Paraguay) Nacional
Ortigoza 35' (pen.)	Report

Estadio Pedro Bidegain, Buenos Aires
Referee: Sandro Ricci (Brazil)

San Lorenzo won 2–1 on aggregate.
