= 2014 Copa Libertadores second stage =

The second stage of the 2014 Copa Libertadores de América was played from February 11 to April 10, 2014. A total of 32 teams competed in the second stage.

== Draw ==
The draw of the tournament was held on December 12, 2013, 21:00 UTC−3, at the CONMEBOL Convention Centre in Luque, Paraguay.

For the second stage, the 32 teams were drawn into eight groups of four containing one team from each of the four seeding pots. The seeding of each team was determined by their association and qualifying berth (as per the rotational agreement established by CONMEBOL, the teams which qualified through berths 1 from Colombia, Ecuador, Peru and Venezuela were seeded into Pot 1 for odd-numbered years, while the teams which qualified through berths 1 from Bolivia, Chile, Paraguay and Uruguay were seeded into Pot 1 for even-numbered years). Teams from the same association in Pots 1 and 2 could not be drawn into the same group. However, a first stage winner, whose identity was not known at the time of the draw, could be drawn into the same group with another team from the same association.

== Seeding ==
The following were the seeding of the 32 teams entered into the second stage draw, which included the 26 automatic qualifiers and the 6 first stage winners:

Pot 1	Pot 2	Pot 3	Pot 4
(Argentina) Vélez Sarsfield (Argentina) Newell's Old Boys (Brazil) Atlético Mineiro (Brazil) Cruzeiro (Bolivia) Bolívar (Chile) Unión Española (Paraguay) Cerro Porteño (Uruguay) Peñarol	(Argentina) San Lorenzo (Argentina) Arsenal (Brazil) Flamengo (Brazil) Grêmio (Bolivia) The Strongest (Chile) O'Higgins (Paraguay) Nacional (Uruguay) Defensor Sporting	(Colombia) Atlético Nacional (Colombia) Deportivo Cali (Ecuador) Emelec (Ecuador) Independiente del Valle (Peru) Universitario (Peru) Real Garcilaso (Venezuela) Zamora (Venezuela) Deportivo Anzoátegui	(Mexico) Santos Laguna (Mexico) León; First stage winner G1; First stage winner G2; First stage winner G3; First stage winner G4; First stage winner G5; First stage winner G6

The first stage winners were:

- Winner G1: (Brazil) Atlético Paranaense
- Winner G2: (Brazil) Botafogo
- Winner G3: Universidad de Chile
- Winner G4: (Argentina) Lanús
- Winner G5: (Colombia) Santa Fe
- Winner G6: (Uruguay) Nacional

== Format ==
In the second stage, each group was played on a home-and-away round-robin basis. Each team earned 3 points for a win, 1 point for a draw, and 0 points for a loss. If tied on points, the following criteria were used to determine the ranking: 1. Goal difference; 2. Goals scored; 3. Away goals scored; 4. Drawing of lots. The winners and runners-up of each group advanced to the round of 16.

== Groups ==
The matches were played on February 11–13, 18–20, 25–27, March 11–13, 18–20, 25–27, April 1–3, and 8–10, 2014.

=== Group 1 ===
Pos	Team	Pld	W	D	L	GF	GA	GD	Pts	VEL	STR	CAP	UNI
1	(Argentina) Vélez Sarsfield	6	5	0	1	9	3	+6	15		2–0	2–0	1–0
2	(Bolivia) The Strongest	6	3	1	2	8	7	+1	10	2–0		2–1	1–0
3	(Brazil) Atlético Paranaense	6	3	0	3	7	7	0	9	1–3	1–0		3–0
4	(Peru) Universitario	6	0	1	5	3	10	−7	1	0–1	3–3	0–1	

February 11, 2014
21:30 UTC−5

Universitario (Peru)	0–1	(Argentina) Vélez Sarsfield
	Report	Canteros 80'

Estadio Monumental "U", Lima
Referee: Roddy Zambrano (Ecuador)
February 13, 2014
20:00 UTC−2

Atlético Paranaense (Brazil)	1–0	(Bolivia) The Strongest
Paulinho Dias 23'	Report

Estádio Vila Capanema, Curitiba
Referee: Daniel Fedorczuk (Uruguay)

February 20, 2014
21:15 UTC−4

The Strongest (Bolivia)	1–0	(Peru) Universitario
Wayar 70'	Report

Estadio Hernando Siles, La Paz
Referee: Julio Quintana (Paraguay)
February 25, 2014
19:45 UTC−3

Vélez Sarsfield (Argentina)	2–0	(Brazil) Atlético Paranaense
Tobio 37'; Pratto 78'	Report

Estadio José Amalfitani, Buenos Aires
Referee: Roberto Silvera (Uruguay)

March 11, 2014
20:15 UTC−4

The Strongest (Bolivia)	2–0	(Argentina) Vélez Sarsfield
P. Escobar 55' (pen.), 76'	Report

Estadio Hernando Siles, La Paz
Referee: Julio Bascuñán (Chile)
March 13, 2014
21:30 UTC−5

Universitario (Peru)	0–1	(Brazil) Atlético Paranaense
	Report	Duarte 67' (o.g.)

Estadio Monumental "U", Lima
Referee: Imer Machado (Colombia)

March 18, 2014
22:00 UTC−3

Vélez Sarsfield (Argentina)	2–0	(Bolivia) The Strongest
Pratto 78'; J. Correa 80'	Report

Estadio José Amalfitani, Buenos Aires
Referee: Juan Soto (Venezuela)
March 20, 2014
17:30 UTC−3

Atlético Paranaense (Brazil)	3–0	(Peru) Universitario
Dalton 10' (o.g.); Felipe 61'; Éderson 84'	Report

Estádio Vila Capanema, Curitiba
Referee: Patricio Polic (Chile)

March 26, 2014
22:00 UTC−3

Atlético Paranaense (Brazil)	1–3	(Argentina) Vélez Sarsfield
Draúsio 53'	Report	Allione 6'; Pratto 59'; Canteros 90+2'

Estádio Vila Capanema, Curitiba
Referee: Wilmar Roldán (Colombia)
March 27, 2014
21:00 UTC−5

Universitario (Peru)	3–3	(Bolivia) The Strongest
Ruidíaz 28'; C. Gonzáles 37'; Gómez 56' (pen.)	Report	Chávez 32' (o.g.); Cristaldo 65'; Reinoso 89'

Estadio Monumental "U", Lima
Referee: Hernando Buitrago (Colombia)

April 8, 2014
19:45 UTC−3

Vélez Sarsfield (Argentina)	1–0	(Peru) Universitario
Nanni 51'	Report

Estadio José Amalfitani, Buenos Aires
Referee: Carlos Ulloa (Chile)
April 8, 2014
18:45 UTC−4

The Strongest (Bolivia)	2–1	(Brazil) Atlético Paranaense
Manoel 39' (o.g.); Solíz 54'	Report	Adriano 45+2'

Estadio Hernando Siles, La Paz
Referee: Roddy Zambrano (Ecuador)

=== Group 2 ===
Pos	Team	Pld	W	D	L	GF	GA	GD	Pts	UES	SLO	IDV	BOT
1	(Chile) Unión Española	6	2	3	1	10	9	+1	9		1–0	4–5	1–1
2	(Argentina) San Lorenzo	6	2	2	2	6	5	+1	8	1–1		1–0	3–0
3	(Ecuador) Independiente del Valle	6	2	2	2	10	10	0	8	2–2	1–1		2–1
4	(Brazil) Botafogo	6	2	1	3	5	7	−2	7	0–1	2–0	1–0	

February 11, 2014
20:00 UTC−2

Botafogo (Brazil)	2–0	(Argentina) San Lorenzo
Ferreyra 29'; Wallyson 51'	Report

Estádio do Maracanã, Rio de Janeiro
Attendance: 28,116
Referee: Roberto Silvera (Uruguay)
February 18, 2014
20:30 UTC−5

Independiente del Valle (Ecuador)	2–2	(Chile) Unión Española
Sornoza 30' (pen.); Guerrero 57'	Report	Jaime 53'; Chávez 58'

Estadio Rumiñahui, Sangolquí
Referee: Raúl Orosco (Bolivia)

February 26, 2014
19:45 UTC−3

Unión Española (Chile)	1–1	(Brazil) Botafogo
Chávez 74'	Report	Ferreyra 86'

Estadio Santa Laura-Universidad SEK, Independencia
Referee: Juan Soto (Venezuela)
February 27, 2014
19:30 UTC−3

San Lorenzo (Argentina)	1–0	(Ecuador) Independiente del Valle
Á. Correa 55'	Report

Estadio Pedro Bidegain, Buenos Aires
Referee: Enrique Cáceres (Paraguay)

March 12, 2014
19:45 UTC−3

San Lorenzo (Argentina)	1–1	(Chile) Unión Española
Matos 20'	Report	Canales 83'

Estadio Pedro Bidegain, Buenos Aires
Referee: Darío Ubriaco (Uruguay)
March 12, 2014
17:45 UTC−5

Independiente del Valle (Ecuador)	2–1	(Brazil) Botafogo
Núñez 26'; Sornoza 90'	Report	Bolívar 59'

Estadio Rumiñahui, Sangolquí
Referee: Manuel Garay (Peru)

March 18, 2014
22:00 UTC−3

Botafogo (Brazil)	1–0	(Ecuador) Independiente del Valle
Ferreyra 2'	Report

Estádio do Maracanã, Rio de Janeiro
Referee: Darío Ubriaco (Uruguay)
March 20, 2014
22:00 UTC−3

Unión Española (Chile)	1–0	(Argentina) San Lorenzo
Canales 66'	Report

Estadio Santa Laura-Universidad SEK, Independencia
Referee: Hernando Buitrago (Colombia)

March 27, 2014
18:45 UTC−5

Independiente del Valle (Ecuador)	1–1	(Argentina) San Lorenzo
Sornoza 90+5' (pen.)	Report	Blandi 58'

Estadio Olímpico Atahualpa, Quito
Referee: Carlos Amarilla (Paraguay)
April 2, 2014
19:45 UTC−3

Botafogo (Brazil)	0–1	(Chile) Unión Española
	Report	Canales 71' (pen.)

Estádio do Maracanã, Rio de Janeiro
Referee: Daniel Fedorczuk (Uruguay)

April 9, 2014
22:00 UTC−3

San Lorenzo (Argentina)	3–0	(Brazil) Botafogo
Villalba 28'; Piatti 53', 88'	Report

Estadio Pedro Bidegain, Buenos Aires
Referee: Juan Soto (Venezuela)
April 9, 2014
22:00 UTC−3

Unión Española (Chile)	4–5	(Ecuador) Independiente del Valle
Campos 10', 59'; León 65' (o.g.); Canales 72' (pen.)	Report	Angulo 11', 48', 57', 75'; Sornoza 77' (pen.)

Estadio Santa Laura-Universidad SEK, Independencia
Referee: Julio Quintana (Paraguay)

=== Group 3 ===
Pos	Team	Pld	W	D	L	GF	GA	GD	Pts	CER	LAN	OHI	CAL
1	(Paraguay) Cerro Porteño	6	3	1	2	10	9	+1	10		3–1	2–1	3–2
2	(Argentina) Lanús	6	2	2	2	6	5	+1	8	2–0		0–0	2–0
3	(Chile) O'Higgins	6	1	4	1	5	5	0	7	2–2	0–0		1–0
4	(Colombia) Deportivo Cali	6	2	1	3	6	8	−2	7	1–0	2–1	1–1	

February 12, 2014
21:15 UTC−5

Deportivo Cali (Colombia)	1–0	(Paraguay) Cerro Porteño
Viáfara 72'	Report

Estadio Pascual Guerrero, Cali
Referee: Paulo Oliveira (Brazil)
February 13, 2014
21:15 UTC−3

Lanús (Argentina)	0–0	(Chile) O'Higgins
	Report

Estadio Ciudad de Lanús, Lanús
Referee: Oscar Maldonado (Bolivia)

February 19, 2014
21:45 UTC−3

O'Higgins (Chile)	1–0	(Colombia) Deportivo Cali
Opazo 83'	Report

Estadio Monumental David Arellano, Santiago
Referee: Ricardo Marques (Brazil)
February 26, 2014
19:45 UTC−3

Cerro Porteño (Paraguay)	3–1	(Argentina) Lanús
Güiza 46'; Dos Santos 50', 55' (pen.)	Report	Ortiz 59'

Estadio General Pablo Rojas, Asunción
Referee: Héber Lopes (Brazil)

March 13, 2014
21:15 UTC−3

O'Higgins (Chile)	2–2	(Paraguay) Cerro Porteño
López 35'; Figueroa 46'	Report	Gamarra 54'; Dos Santos 77'

Estadio Monumental David Arellano, Santiago
Referee: Martín Vázquez (Uruguay)
March 13, 2014
21:30 UTC−5

Deportivo Cali (Colombia)	2–1	(Argentina) Lanús
Viáfara 62'; Lizarazo 73' (pen.)	Report	Acosta 19'

Estadio Pascual Guerrero, Cali
Referee: Leandro Vuaden (Brazil)

March 20, 2014
19:45 UTC−3

Lanús (Argentina)	2–0	(Colombia) Deportivo Cali
Pereyra Díaz 2'; Velázquez 4'	Report

Estadio Ciudad de Lanús, Lanús
Referee: Daniel Fedorczuk (Uruguay)
March 20, 2014
19:45 UTC−3

Cerro Porteño (Paraguay)	2–1	(Chile) O'Higgins
Güiza 2'; Dos Santos 7' (pen.)	Report	Calandria 9' (pen.)

Estadio General Pablo Rojas, Asunción
Referee: Víctor Carrillo (Peru)

March 26, 2014
20:00 UTC−5

Deportivo Cali (Colombia)	1–1	(Chile) O'Higgins
Camacho 90+2'	Report	Opazo 56'

Estadio Pascual Guerrero, Cali
Referee: Roberto García (Mexico)
March 27, 2014
18:30 UTC−3

Lanús (Argentina)	2–0	(Paraguay) Cerro Porteño
Araujo 71'; O. Benítez 89'	Report

Estadio Ciudad de Lanús, Lanús
Referee: Roberto Silvera (Uruguay)

April 8, 2014
21:00 UTC−4

Cerro Porteño (Paraguay)	3–2	(Colombia) Deportivo Cali
Corujo 37'; Güiza 44'; Dos Santos 79' (pen.)	Report	Marrugo 11'; Rivas 61'

Estadio General Pablo Rojas, Asunción
Referee: Darío Ubriaco (Uruguay)
April 8, 2014
22:00 UTC−3

O'Higgins (Chile)	0–0	(Argentina) Lanús
	Report

Estadio El Teniente, Rancagua
Referee: Wilton Sampaio (Brazil)

=== Group 4 ===
Pos	Team	Pld	W	D	L	GF	GA	GD	Pts	CAM	NAC	ZAM	SAN
1	(Brazil) Atlético Mineiro	6	3	3	0	8	5	+3	12		1–1	1–0	2–1
2	(Paraguay) Nacional	6	2	2	2	8	10	−2	8	2–2		1–0	3–2
3	(Venezuela) Zamora	6	2	1	3	6	6	0	7	0–1	2–0		2–1
4	(Colombia) Santa Fe	6	1	2	3	10	11	−1	5	1–1	3–1	2–2	

February 11, 2014
19:45 UTC−4:30

Zamora (Venezuela)	0–1	(Brazil) Atlético Mineiro
	Report	Jô 87'

Estadio Agustín Tovar, Barinas
Referee: Mauro Vigliano (Argentina)
February 11, 2014
21:30 UTC−5

Santa Fe (Colombia)	3–1	(Paraguay) Nacional
Méndez 57'; Torres 58'; Copete 80'	Report	N. Martínez 77' (pen.)

Estadio El Campín, Bogotá
Referee: Germán Delfino (Argentina)

February 20, 2014
20:00 UTC−3

Nacional (Paraguay)	1–0	(Venezuela) Zamora
Melgarejo 9'	Report

Estadio Defensores del Chaco, Asunción
Referee: Christian Ferreyra (Uruguay)
February 26, 2014
22:00 UTC−3

Atlético Mineiro (Brazil)	2–1	(Colombia) Santa Fe
Jô 61'; Neto Berola 86'	Report	Pérez 59'

Estádio Independência, Belo Horizonte
Referee: Daniel Fedorczuk (Uruguay)

March 12, 2014
20:30 UTC−4:30

Zamora (Venezuela)	2–1	(Colombia) Santa Fe
Ramírez 58' (pen.); Falcón 83'	Report	Copete 71'

Estadio Agustín Tovar, Barinas
Referee: Roddy Zambrano (Ecuador)
March 12, 2014
22:00 UTC−3

Nacional (Paraguay)	2–2	(Brazil) Atlético Mineiro
Melgarejo 8'; Torales 86' (pen.)	Report	Josué 21'; Jô 26'

Estadio Antonio Oddone Sarubbi, Ciudad del Este
Referee: Patricio Loustau (Argentina)

March 18, 2014
20:00 UTC−5

Santa Fe (Colombia)	2–2	(Venezuela) Zamora
Pérez 25', 87'	Report	Falcón 45+2', 72'

Estadio El Campín, Bogotá
Referee: Oscar Maldonado (Bolivia)
March 19, 2014
19:45 UTC−3

Atlético Mineiro (Brazil)	1–1	(Paraguay) Nacional
Ronaldinho 19' (pen.)	Report	M. Riveros 36'

Estádio Independência, Belo Horizonte
Referee: Omar Ponce (Ecuador)

March 25, 2014
19:15 UTC−4:30

Zamora (Venezuela)	2–0	(Paraguay) Nacional
Falcón 57'; Murillo 64'	Report

Estadio Agustín Tovar, Barinas
Referee: Diego Abal (Argentina)
April 3, 2014
21:00 UTC−5

Santa Fe (Colombia)	1–1	(Brazil) Atlético Mineiro
Cuero 63'	Report	Guilherme 7'

Estadio El Campín, Bogotá
Referee: Saúl Laverni (Argentina)

April 10, 2014
16:30 UTC−4

Nacional (Paraguay)	3–2	(Colombia) Santa Fe
J. Benítez 38'; Bareiro 47'; Torales 83'	Report	Medina 30', 81' (pen.)

Estadio Defensores del Chaco, Asunción
Referee: Martín Vázquez (Uruguay)
April 10, 2014
17:30 UTC−3

Atlético Mineiro (Brazil)	1–0	(Venezuela) Zamora
Jô 9'	Report

Estádio Independência, Belo Horizonte
Referee: Roberto Tobar (Chile)

=== Group 5 ===
Pos	Team	Pld	W	D	L	GF	GA	GD	Pts	DEF	CRU	UCH	GAR
1	(Uruguay) Defensor Sporting	6	3	2	1	11	5	+6	11		2–0	1–1	4–1
2	(Brazil) Cruzeiro	6	3	1	2	13	7	+6	10	2–2		5–1	3–0
3	Universidad de Chile	6	3	1	2	6	9	−3	10	1–0	0–2		1–0
4	(Peru) Real Garcilaso	6	1	0	5	4	13	−9	3	0–2	2–1	1–2	

February 12, 2014
19:00 UTC−5

Real Garcilaso (Peru)	2–1	(Brazil) Cruzeiro
Brítez 52'; R. Rodríguez 62'	Report	Bruno Rodrigo 20'

Estadio Huancayo, Huancayo
Referee: José Argote (Venezuela)
February 13, 2014
19:00 UTC−3

Universidad de Chile	1–0	(Uruguay) Defensor Sporting
Lorenzetti 82'	Report

Estadio Nacional Julio Martínez Prádanos, Santiago
Referee: Enrique Cáceres (Paraguay)

February 19, 2014
20:30 UTC−2

Defensor Sporting (Uruguay)	4–1	(Peru) Real Garcilaso
N. Correa 35'; Gedoz 46'; Olivera 69', 86'	Report	Ramúa 20'

Estadio Luis Franzini, Montevideo
Referee: Roddy Zambrano (Ecuador)
February 25, 2014
17:30 UTC−3

Cruzeiro (Brazil)	5–1	Universidad de Chile
Ricardo Goulart 33', 42', 84'; Dagoberto 38'; Willian 89'	Report	Lorenzetti 65'

Estádio Mineirão, Belo Horizonte
Referee: Saúl Laverni (Argentina)

March 11, 2014
19:00 UTC−3

Defensor Sporting (Uruguay)	2–0	(Brazil) Cruzeiro
Gedoz 63', 77'	Report

Estadio Luis Franzini, Montevideo
Referee: Diego Abal (Argentina)
March 11, 2014
21:30 UTC−5

Real Garcilaso (Peru)	1–2	Universidad de Chile
V. Ferreira 36'	Report	R. Fernández 39'; Gutiérrez 76'

Estadio Huancayo, Huancayo
Referee: Wilmar Roldán (Colombia)

March 18, 2014
19:45 UTC−3

Universidad de Chile	1–0	(Peru) Real Garcilaso
Herrera 61' (pen.)	Report

Estadio Santa Laura-Universidad SEK, Independencia
Referee: Antonio Arias (Paraguay)
March 20, 2014
22:00 UTC−3

Cruzeiro (Brazil)	2–2	(Uruguay) Defensor Sporting
Everton Ribeiro 45+4'; Júlio Baptista 62'	Report	Gedoz 65'; Zeballos 90+3'

Estádio Mineirão, Belo Horizonte
Referee: Mauro Vigliano (Argentina)

April 1, 2014
19:00 UTC−5

Real Garcilaso (Peru)	0–2	(Uruguay) Defensor Sporting
	Report	Amado 50'; De Arrascaeta 53'

Estadio Huancayo, Huancayo
Referee: Julio Quintana (Paraguay)
April 3, 2014
20:45 UTC−3

Universidad de Chile	0–2	(Brazil) Cruzeiro
	Report	Bruno Rodrigo 16'; Samudio 39'

Estadio Nacional Julio Martínez Prádanos, Santiago
Referee: Germán Delfino (Argentina)

April 9, 2014
22:00 UTC−3

Cruzeiro (Brazil)	3–0	(Peru) Real Garcilaso
Ricardo Goulart 23'; Bruno Rodrigo 26'; Júlio Baptista 41'	Report

Estádio Mineirão, Belo Horizonte
Referee: Adrián Vélez (Colombia)
April 9, 2014
22:00 UTC−3

Defensor Sporting (Uruguay)	1–1	Universidad de Chile
M. Alonso 56'	Report	R. Fernández 38'

Estadio Luis Franzini, Montevideo
Referee: Patricio Loustau (Argentina)

=== Group 6 ===
Pos	Team	Pld	W	D	L	GF	GA	GD	Pts	GRE	ATL	NOB	NAC
1	(Brazil) Grêmio	6	4	2	0	8	1	+7	14		3–0	0–0	1–0
2	(Colombia) Atlético Nacional	6	3	1	2	7	8	−1	10	0–2		1–0	2–2
3	(Argentina) Newell's Old Boys	6	2	2	2	10	7	+3	8	1–1	1–3		4–0
4	(Uruguay) Nacional	6	0	1	5	4	13	−9	1	0–1	0–1	2–4	

February 13, 2014
22:15 UTC−2

Nacional (Uruguay)	0–1	(Brazil) Grêmio
	Report	C. Riveros 68'

Estadio Gran Parque Central, Montevideo
Referee: Antonio Arias (Paraguay)
February 13, 2014
21:30 UTC−5

Atlético Nacional (Colombia)	1–0	(Argentina) Newell's Old Boys
Cardona 80'	Report

Estadio Atanasio Girardot, Medellín
Referee: Julio Bascuñán (Chile)

February 25, 2014
22:00 UTC−3

Grêmio (Brazil)	3–0	(Colombia) Atlético Nacional
Luan 28'; Ramiro 64'; Ruiz 88'	Report

Arena do Grêmio, Porto Alegre
Referee: Patricio Polic (Chile)
February 27, 2014
21:45 UTC−3

Newell's Old Boys (Argentina)	4–0	(Uruguay) Nacional
M. Rodríguez 12'; Curbelo 45+1' (o.g.); Bernardi 53'; Orzán 86'	Report

Estadio Marcelo Bielsa, Rosario
Referee: Enrique Osses (Chile)

March 11, 2014
19:15 UTC−5

Atlético Nacional (Colombia)	2–2	(Uruguay) Nacional
Bocanegra 70', 90+1'	Report	De Pena 3'; García 18'

Estadio Atanasio Girardot, Medellín
Referee: Marco Rodríguez (Mexico)
March 13, 2014
21:15 UTC−3

Grêmio (Brazil)	0–0	(Argentina) Newell's Old Boys
	Report

Arena do Grêmio, Porto Alegre
Referee: Carlos Amarilla (Paraguay)

March 18, 2014
19:45 UTC−3

Nacional (Uruguay)	0–1	(Colombia) Atlético Nacional
	Report	Cardona 63'

Estadio Gran Parque Central, Montevideo
Referee: Raúl Orosco (Bolivia)
March 19, 2014
22:00 UTC−3

Newell's Old Boys (Argentina)	1–1	(Brazil) Grêmio
M. Rodríguez 78'	Report	Rhodolfo 90+1'

Estadio Marcelo Bielsa, Rosario
Referee: Carlos Vera (Ecuador)

March 26, 2014
19:45 UTC−3

Nacional (Uruguay)	2–4	(Argentina) Newell's Old Boys
Mascia 11'; Scotti 60' (pen.)	Report	A. Castro 21'; M. Cáceres 53'; Trezeguet 74', 90'

Estadio Centenario, Montevideo
Referee: Patricio Polic (Chile)
April 2, 2014
20:00 UTC−5

Atlético Nacional (Colombia)	0–2	(Brazil) Grêmio
	Report	Dudu 52'; Barcos 69'

Estadio Atanasio Girardot, Medellín
Referee: Enrique Cáceres (Paraguay)

April 10, 2014
22:00 UTC−3

Grêmio (Brazil)	1–0	(Uruguay) Nacional
Barcos 12' (pen.)	Report

Arena do Grêmio, Porto Alegre
Referee: Oscar Maldonado (Bolivia)
April 10, 2014
22:00 UTC−3

Newell's Old Boys (Argentina)	1–3	(Colombia) Atlético Nacional
Casco 16'	Report	Tréllez 7'; Cárdenas 13'; Berrío 54'

Estadio Marcelo Bielsa, Rosario
Referee: Antonio Arias (Paraguay)

=== Group 7 ===
Pos	Team	Pld	W	D	L	GF	GA	GD	Pts	BOL	LEO	FLA	EME
1	(Bolivia) Bolívar	6	3	2	1	8	6	+2	11		1–1	1–0	2–1
2	(Mexico) León	6	3	1	2	10	7	+3	10	0–1		2–1	3–0
3	(Brazil) Flamengo	6	2	1	3	10	10	0	7	2–2	2–3		3–1
4	(Ecuador) Emelec	6	2	0	4	7	12	−5	6	2–1	2–1	1–2	

February 12, 2014
18:00 UTC−6

León (Mexico)	2–1	(Brazil) Flamengo
Boselli 31' (pen.); Arizala 67'	Report	V. Cáceres 42'

Estadio León, León
Referee: Hernando Buitrago (Colombia)
February 13, 2014
21:30 UTC−5

Emelec (Ecuador)	2–1	(Bolivia) Bolívar
Mena 11'; Giménez 73'	Report	Callejón 9'

Estadio George Capwell, Guayaquil
Referee: Patricio Polic (Chile)

February 19, 2014
20:45 UTC−4

Bolívar (Bolivia)	1–1	(Mexico) León
Callejón 66'	Report	Boselli 2'

Estadio Hernando Siles, La Paz
Referee: Manuel Garay (Peru)
February 26, 2014
22:00 UTC−3

Flamengo (Brazil)	3–1	(Ecuador) Emelec
Elano 10'; Hernane 54'; Éverton 81'	Report	Escalada 87'

Estádio do Maracanã, Rio de Janeiro
Referee: Néstor Pitana (Argentina)

March 11, 2014
21:30 UTC−5

Emelec (Ecuador)	2–1	(Mexico) León
Escalada 15', 60'	Report	Peña 21'

Estadio George Capwell, Guayaquil
Referee: José Argote (Venezuela)
March 12, 2014
22:00 UTC−3

Flamengo (Brazil)	2–2	(Bolivia) Bolívar
Éverton 54', 65'	Report	Capdevila 52'; Pedriel 72'

Estádio do Maracanã, Rio de Janeiro
Referee: Enrique Osses (Chile)

March 19, 2014
19:00 UTC−6

León (Mexico)	3–0	(Ecuador) Emelec
Britos 19'; Vázquez 81' (pen.); Peña 85'	Report

Estadio León, León
Referee: Diego Ceballos (Argentina)
March 19, 2014
21:00 UTC−4

Bolívar (Bolivia)	1–0	(Brazil) Flamengo
Arce 4' (pen.)	Report

Estadio Hernando Siles, La Paz
Referee: Mario Díaz de Vivar (Paraguay)

March 26, 2014
21:15 UTC−6

León (Mexico)	0–1	(Bolivia) Bolívar
	Report	W. Ferreira 69'

Estadio León, León
Referee: Marlon Escalante (Venezuela)
April 2, 2014
20:00 UTC−5

Emelec (Ecuador)	1–2	(Brazil) Flamengo
Stracqualursi 65' (pen.)	Report	Alecsandro 8' (pen.); Paulinho 90+2'

Estadio George Capwell, Guayaquil
Referee: Julio Bascuñán (Chile)

April 9, 2014
19:45 UTC−3

Flamengo (Brazil)	2–3	(Mexico) León
André Santos 29'; Alecsandro 34'	Report	Arizala 20'; Boselli 30'; Peña 83'

Estádio do Maracanã, Rio de Janeiro
Referee: Diego Abal (Argentina)
April 9, 2014
18:45 UTC−4

Bolívar (Bolivia)	2–1	(Ecuador) Emelec
W. Ferreira 1'; Callejón 50'	Report	Escalada 87'

Estadio Hernando Siles, La Paz
Referee: Mauro Vigliano (Argentina)

=== Group 8 ===
Pos	Team	Pld	W	D	L	GF	GA	GD	Pts	SLA	ARS	PEN	ANZ
1	(Mexico) Santos Laguna	6	4	1	1	11	5	+6	13		1–0	4–1	3–0
2	(Argentina) Arsenal	6	4	0	2	11	4	+7	12	3–0		1–0	3–0
3	(Uruguay) Peñarol	6	1	2	3	5	10	−5	5	0–2	2–1		1–1
4	(Venezuela) Deportivo Anzoátegui	6	0	3	3	4	12	−8	3	1–1	1–3	1–1	

February 11, 2014
18:15 UTC−6

Santos Laguna (Mexico)	1–0	(Argentina) Arsenal
Peralta 18'	Report

Estadio Corona, Torreón
Referee: Adrián Vélez (Colombia)
February 12, 2014
17:15 UTC−4:30

Deportivo Anzoátegui (Venezuela)	1–1	(Uruguay) Peñarol
Villegas 38'	Report	Zalayeta 78'

Estadio José Antonio Anzoátegui, Puerto la Cruz
Referee: Diego Lara (Ecuador)

February 18, 2014
21:15 UTC−2

Peñarol (Uruguay)	0–2	(Mexico) Santos Laguna
	Report	Lacerda 53'; Abella 90'

Estadio Centenario, Montevideo
Referee: Héber Lopes (Brazil)
February 25, 2014
22:00 UTC−3

Arsenal (Argentina)	3–0	(Venezuela) Deportivo Anzoátegui
Furch 15'; Carrera 42'; Caraglio 50'	Report

Estadio Julio Humberto Grondona, Sarandí
Referee: Víctor Carrillo (Peru)

March 11, 2014
19:45 UTC−4:30

Deportivo Anzoátegui (Venezuela)	1–1	(Mexico) Santos Laguna
Arteaga 71'	Report	Peralta 62'

Estadio José Antonio Anzoátegui, Puerto la Cruz
Referee: Raúl Orosco (Bolivia)
March 13, 2014
19:00 UTC−3

Arsenal (Argentina)	1–0	(Uruguay) Peñarol
Furch 3'	Report

Estadio Julio Humberto Grondona, Sarandí
Referee: Sandro Ricci (Brazil)

March 18, 2014
21:15 UTC−6

Santos Laguna (Mexico)	3–0	(Venezuela) Deportivo Anzoátegui
Rentería 12'; Orozco 55'; Peralta 65'	Report

Estadio Corona, Torreón
Referee: Wilson Lamouroux (Colombia)
March 19, 2014
19:45 UTC−3

Peñarol (Uruguay)	2–1	(Argentina) Arsenal
Aguiar 69'; J. Rodríguez 81'	Report	Marcone 53'

Estadio Centenario, Montevideo
Referee: Wilton Sampaio (Brazil)

March 25, 2014
20:00 UTC−6

Santos Laguna (Mexico)	4–1	(Uruguay) Peñarol
Quintero 8', 78'; Orozco 58'; Rentería 79'	Report	Toledo 1'

Estadio Corona, Torreón
Referee: Leandro Vuaden (Brazil)
March 26, 2014
18:15 UTC−4:30

Deportivo Anzoátegui (Venezuela)	1–3	(Argentina) Arsenal
R. Escobar 55'	Report	Sánchez 35'; Rolle 64'; Zaldivia 90+2'

Estadio José Antonio Anzoátegui, Puerto la Cruz
Referee: Ricardo Marques (Brazil)

April 10, 2014
19:45 UTC−3

Arsenal (Argentina)	3–0	(Mexico) Santos Laguna
Zelaya 20', 73'; Echeverría 54'	Report

Estadio Julio Humberto Grondona, Sarandí
Referee: Marcelo Henrique (Brazil)
April 10, 2014
19:45 UTC−3

Peñarol (Uruguay)	1–1	(Venezuela) Deportivo Anzoátegui
Silva 8'	Report	Aguilar 64'

Estadio Centenario, Montevideo
Referee: Diego Haro (Peru)
