= Lusardi =

Lusardi is a surname. Notable people with the surname include:

- Andrea Lussardi (born 1992), Italian footballer
- Greg Lusardi (born 1953), American football player and coach
- Hugo Lusardi (1982–2022), Paraguayan professional footballer
- Linda Lusardi (born 1958), English actress, television presenter and former nude model

== See also ==
- Lusardi's, restaurant in Manhattan, New York City, USA
