= David Mendoza =

David Mendoza may refer to:

- David Mendoza Arellano (born 1970), Mexican politician
- David Mendoza (footballer) (born 1985), Paraguayan footballer
