= Julio Santa Cruz =

Paraguayan footballer (born 1990)

Personal information
- Full name: Julio Eduardo Santa Cruz Cantero
- Date of birth: 12 May 1990 (age 36)
- Place of birth: Asunción, Paraguay
- Height: 1.83 m (6 ft 0 in)
- Position: Forward

Youth career
- Cerro Porteño

Senior career*
Years	Team	Apps	(Gls)
2008	Cerro Porteño	0	(0)
2008–2011	Blackburn Rovers	0	(0)
2011–2013	Olimpia Asunción	8	(0)
2013	Deportivo Capiatá	14	(5)
2014–2015	Nacional Asunción	56	(7)
2016	Deportivo Capiatá	7	(1)
2017	Sportivo Trinidense	6	(0)
2017–2018	General Díaz	36	(4)
2019	Pelotas	0	(0)
2019	General Díaz	7	(2)
Total		134	(19)
- * Club domestic league appearances and goals

Julio Eduardo Santa Cruz Cantero (locally [ˈxuljo eˈðwaɾðo santa ˈkɾus kanˈteɾo]; born 12 May 1990) is a Paraguayan former professional footballer who played as a forward. He is most notable for scoring during the first leg of the 2014 Copa Libertadores Finals. He is the brother of Roque Santa Cruz.

== Career ==
=== Cerro Porteño ===
In August 2006, Santa Cruz was part of Cerro Porteño's U16 squad in a victory against Olimpia Asunción U16. Santa Cruz was a member of the club's first-team for the 2008 season, also with several other youth team graduates as Rodrigo Burgos, Celso Ortiz, Ivan Piris and Luis Caceres.

=== Blackburn Rovers ===
==== 2008–2011 ====
On 6 August 2008, the BBC reported that Blackburn Rovers had signed Santa Cruz. He joined the club on a three-year deal from Primera División Paraguaya team Cerro Porteño. Santa Cruz had been on trial at Ewood Park since the end of the 2007–08 season and over the summer, and it was likely that he would join the reserve team. On signing with the club, Santa Cruz commented, "I'm happy to be here at Blackburn, it will be an amazing adventure for me".

Manager Paul Ince had completed the deal for Santa Cruz for the 2008–09 season where he would play alongside his brother, and the transfer was subject to international clearance.

Upon his arrival at the club in 2008, Santa Cruz made 11 league appearances for Blackburn's reserve team until his departure in 2011.

Speculation was made by his father and manager, Aproniano, that he could return to Paraguayan football for the 2011 season. Santa Cruz regularly appeared for the reserve squad but had yet to receive a first-team contract. His father explained to ABC Color that the priority was to keep Santa Cruz in Europe but would not rule out the option of Santa Cruz returning to a Paraguayan club that played in the Copa Libertadores or Copa Sudamericana, CONMEBOL's continental competitions, and that the club could be Cerro Porteño.

In December 2010, Olimpia Asunción president Marcelo Recanate indicated that he wanted Julio Santa Cruz, and had spoken with his elder brother, so that he could sign Julio for the 2011 season.

=== Olimpia ===
==== 2012 season ====
Santa Cruz debuted for Olimpia in a 0–0 draw against Tacuary on 16 June 2012. Santa Cruz was substituted onto the field for Maxi Biancucchi in the 87th minute.

=== Nacional Asunción ===
Santa Cruz made his first appearance in all competitions for Nacional during the 2014 Copa Libertadores. Santa Cruz, who had been issued the number #29 for the 2014 season, was substituted onto the field in the 89th minute for Julián Benítez in a 3–1 away group stage defeat against Colombia's Independiente Santa Fe on 11 February 2014.

On 16 February 2014, Santa Cruz made his first and full league debut for Nacional in the 2014 Paraguayan Primera División season, playing a full 90 minutes of a 3–0 home victory against Sportivo Luqueño.

Four days later, Santa Cruz featured as a second-half substitute in Nacional's second Copa Libertadores group stage fixture, a 1–0 home victory against Venezuelan club Zamora on 20 February 2014.

His first goal for Nacional came in the 71st minute of a 2–1 home victory against Sol de America on 31 March 2014. The ball had been crossed toward Santa Cruz inside the 18-yard box area who headed the ball across the face of goal into the net to win the match for Nacional.

Santa Cruz scored his second league goal for Nacional in a 4–0 away victory against Club Guaraní 26 April 2014. Santa Cruz had converted a penalty kick from the spot in the 70th minute.

On 6 August 2014, Santa Cruz was substituted onto the field in the 70th minute for Derlis Orué during the first–leg of the 2014 Copa Libertadores Finals against Argentina's San Lorenzo and scored a last-gasp equalizer in the 93rd minute of the match to make the score line 1–1. A long ball had been played in the air from the mid-field and flicked on with the head of striker Fredy Bareiro, toward the front of the right side of the goal posts, as Santa Cruz managed to convert the goal from a tight angle with a right foot shot towards the top of the net. Santa Cruz later stated that the goal was the most important one of his career and that after the match he received a message of congratulations from older brother Roque. During the second–leg on 13 August, Santa Cruz was substituted onto the field in the 85th minute of the match for Julián Benítez as Nacional were ultimately defeated 1–0.

Santa Cruz would not score again until 24 September, scoring the second goal in a 2–1 home victory against Sportivo Luqueño. He had been substituted onto the field in the 23rd minute of the first half for Armando De Giacomi, and scored in the 45th minute to give Nacional a 2–0 lead at half-time. Two weeks later, Santa Cruz scored his fourth league goal of the 2014 season against former side Deportivo Capiatá on 5 October. Santa Cruz, who was in the starting eleven of the fixture, scored in the 43rd minute to give Nacional a 1–0 lead as they went on to claim a 3–2 away victory.

== Personal life ==
Julio Santa Cruz is the younger brother of Roque Santa Cruz, Diego Santa Cruz, and the late Oscar Santa Cruz. His father, Aproniano, manages both Julio and Roque.

== Career statistics ==
Appearances and goals by club, season and competition
Club	Season	League			National cup		League cup		Continental		Other		Total	
Club	Season	Division	Apps	Goals	Apps	Goals	Apps	Goals	Apps	Goals	Apps	Goals	Apps	Goals
Blackburn Rovers	2008–09	Premier League	0	0	0	0	0	0	–		0	0	0	0
Blackburn Rovers	2009–10	Premier League	0	0	0	0	0	0	–		0	0	0	0
Blackburn Rovers	2010–11	Premier League	0	0	0	0	0	0	–		0	0	0	0
Blackburn Rovers	Total		0	0	0	0	0	0	0	0	0	0	0	0
Olimpia Asunción	2011	Paraguayan Primera División	0	0	–		–		0	0	0	0	0	0
Olimpia Asunción	2012	Paraguayan Primera División	8	0	–		–		1	0	0	0	9	0
Olimpia Asunción	Total		8	0	0	0	0	0	1	0	0	0	9	0
Deportivo Capiatá	2013	Paraguayan Primera División	14	5	–		–		–		0	0	14	5
Nacional Asunción	2014	Paraguayan Primera División	30	4	–		–		11	1	0	0	41	5
Career total			52	9	0	0	0	0	12	1	0	0	64	10

== Honours ==
Olimpia Asunción

- Paraguayan Primera División: 2011 Clasura; runner-up: 2011 Apertura, 2012 Apertura

Nacional Asunción

- Copa Libertadores runner-up: 2014
