= Brian Montenegro =

Paraguayan footballer (born 1993)

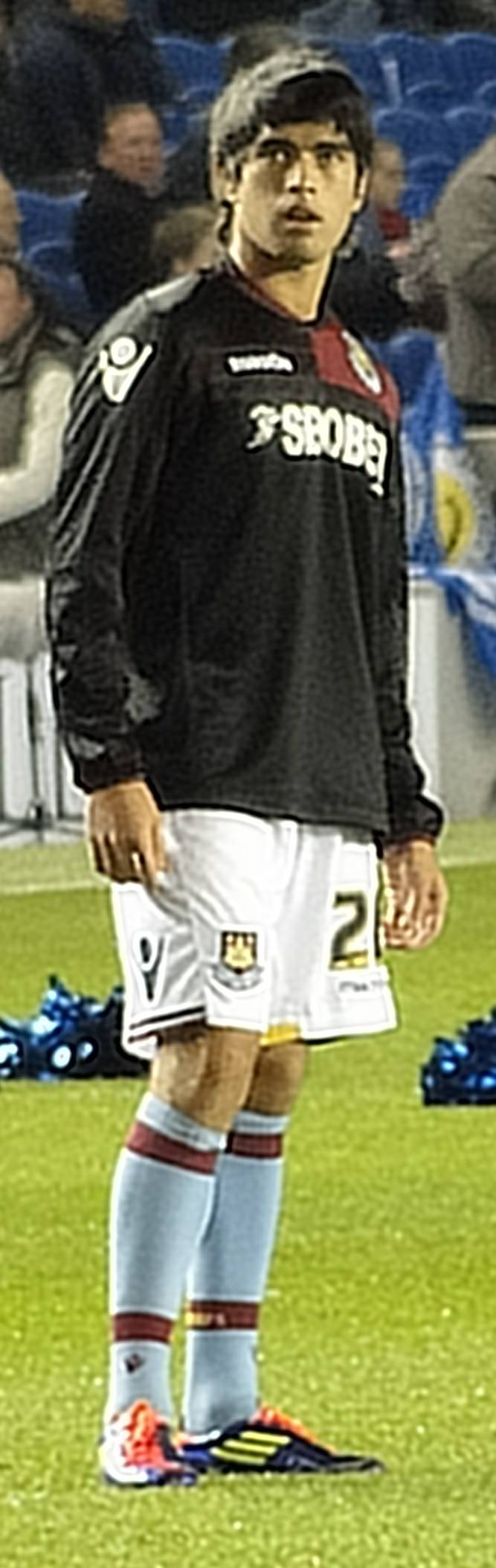
- Montenegro warming up for West Ham United in 2011

Personal information
- Full name: Brian Guillermo Montenegro Martínez
- Date of birth: 10 June 1993 (age 33)
- Place of birth: Asunción, Paraguay
- Height: 1.81 m (5 ft 11 in)
- Positions: Striker; winger

Team information
- Current team: Aucas
- Number: 9

Youth career
- 2004–2010: Tacuary

Senior career*
Years	Team	Apps	(Gls)
2010–2011	Tacuary	51	(7)
2011–2012	Deportivo Maldonado	0	(0)
2011–2012	→ West Ham United (loan)	0	(0)
2012	Tacuary	17	(2)
2013	Rubio Ñú	14	(3)
2013–2014	Libertad	36	(9)
2014–2016	Nacional Asunción	41	(26)
2014–2015	→ Leeds United (loan)	5	(0)
2016–2017	→ Lanús (loan)	12	(0)
2017–2024	Olimpia	141	(44)
2018–2019	→ Talleres (loan)	4	(0)
2021	→ Independiente del Valle (loan)	15	(7)
2021–2022	→ Atlético Goianiense (loan)	8	(1)
2025–	Aucas	20	(7)

International career
2011–2013	Paraguay U20	3	(1)
- * Club domestic league appearances and goals as of 20 August 2025

Brian Guillermo Montenegro Martínez (born 10 June 1993) is a Paraguayan footballer who plays as a winger or striker for Ecuadorian Serie A club S.D. Aucas. He is a former Paraguay U20 international.

== Club career ==
=== Early career ===
Montenegro began his career at Paraguayan club Tacuary where he made 51 appearances and scored seven goals before joining Segunda División Uruguay side Deportivo Maldonado.

=== West Ham United loan ===
He joined West Ham on 29 August 2011 where he signed a season-long loan contract saying, "I am very excited to come here and play in England, I am hoping to get a chance to show the fans what I can do." Montenegro's first and only appearance for the senior squad was as a 78th-minute substitute on 8 January 2012 in a 1–0 FA Cup third round away defeat to Sheffield Wednesday. At the end of the season, a new contract was not agreed and he returned to Paraguay.

=== Tacuary ===
He returned to Tacuary coming on as a second-half substitute in their match against Libertad in August 2012. He scored two goals in 17 games in his second spell at the club.

=== Rubio Ñú and Libertad ===
In 2013, he joined Paraguayan Primera División side Rubio Ñú where he scored three goals in 14 games. His form earned him a move to fellow Paraguayan Primera División side Club Libertad. During the 2013–14 season he scored nine goals in 36 games.

=== Nacional Asunción ===
In July 2014, Montenegro signed with Primera División Paraguaya Club Nacional Asunción to participate in the semi-final stages of the 2014 Copa Libertadores and the Torneo Clasura of the Paraguayan Championship.

Replacing injured forward Fredy Bareiro, Montenegro was in the starting line-up of the first-leg of Nacional's semi-final Copa Libertadores fixture against Defensor Sporting on 22 July. In the 35th minute of the first-half, Montenegro opened the scoring for Nacional, giving them a 1–0 lead, the goal was assisted by Julián Benítez. The fixture concluded 2–0 in favor of Nacional.

Montenegro finished a runner up for Nacional Asunción in the Copa Libertadores final after losing out to Argentina's San Lorenzo 2–1 on aggregate in the two legged final.

==== Loan to Leeds United ====
On 1 September 2014, Montenegro signed on loan for Leeds United, the deal includes an option to buy. Montenegro was given the number 26 shirt for the 2014–15 season.

On 25 October 2014, Montenegro was named in Leeds' matchday squad for the first time when he was named as a substitute against Wolverhampton Wanderers. He made his debut in the same match as a 2nd half substitute in a 2–1 loss. The match was the last game for Head Coach Darko Milanič who was relieved of his duties minutes after the game.

On 4 January 2015, Montenegro made his first Leeds start when he started Leeds' FA Cup 1–0 defeat against Sunderland A.F.C.

After scoring an impressive 15 goals in 17 league games during the 2016 Primera Division Paraguaya season for Nacional Asuncion, Montenegro was loaned to Cerro Porteño for the remainder of their 2016 Copa Libertadores campaign. Several days later however, the transfer was declined due to a documentation requirement.

=== Olimpia ===
==== Loan to Atlético Goianiense ====
On 3 August 2021, Atlético Clube Goianiense announced the signing of Montenegro on a season-long loan from Olimpia.

== International career ==
Montenegro has played for Paraguay's Under-20 side and featured in the 2011 South American Youth Championship in January 2011. He also played at the 2013 FIFA U-20 World Cup in Turkey, where he scored with an "acrobatic overhead kick" against Greece in the group stage.

== Honours ==
Lanús

- Argentine Primera Division: 2016

Atlético Goianiense

- Campeonato Goiano: 2022
