= 2014 Copa Libertadores =

55th season of Copa Libertadores

2014 Copa Libertadores de América
2014 Copa Bridgestone Libertadores de América 2014 Copa Bridgestone Libertadores da América

Tournament details
- Dates: January 28 – August 13, 2014
- Teams: 38 (from 11 associations)

Final positions
- Champions: (Argentina) San Lorenzo (1st title)
- Runners-up: (Paraguay) Nacional

Tournament statistics
- Matches played: 138
- Goals scored: 325 (2.36 per match)
- Attendance: 3,029,439 (21,952 per match)
- Top scorer(s): (Paraguay) Julio dos Santos (Uruguay) Nicolás Olivera (5 goals)

The 2014 Copa Libertadores de América (officially the 2014 Copa Bridgestone Libertadores for sponsorship reasons) was the 55th edition of the Copa Libertadores de América, South America's premier international club football tournament organized by CONMEBOL. Atlético Mineiro were the defending champions, but were eliminated by Atlético Nacional in the round of 16.

In the finals, Argentine team San Lorenzo defeated Paraguayan team Nacional 2–1 on aggregate to win their first title, and earned the right to play in the 2014 FIFA Club World Cup and the 2015 Recopa Sudamericana. The streak of four successive tournaments won by a Brazilian team was broken; in fact, none of the four semifinalists were from Brazil (first time since 1991, and the first finals since 2004 to not feature a Brazilian team) or had reached the final before.

== Qualified teams ==
Association	Team (Berth)	Entry stage	Qualification method
(Argentina) Argentina; 5 berths	Vélez Sarsfield (Argentina 1)	Second stage	2012–13 Primera División super champion
(Argentina) Argentina; 5 berths	Newell's Old Boys (Argentina 2)	Second stage	2013 Torneo Final champion
(Argentina) Argentina; 5 berths	San Lorenzo (Argentina 3)	Second stage	2013 Torneo Inicial champion
(Argentina) Argentina; 5 berths	Arsenal (Argentina 4)	Second stage	2012–13 Copa Argentina champion
(Argentina) Argentina; 5 berths	Lanús (Argentina 5)	First stage	2013 Copa Sudamericana champion
(Bolivia) Bolivia; 3 berths	Bolívar (Bolivia 1)	Second stage	2013 Clausura champion
(Bolivia) Bolivia; 3 berths	The Strongest (Bolivia 2)	Second stage	2013 Apertura champion
(Bolivia) Bolivia; 3 berths	Oriente Petrolero (Bolivia 3)	First stage	2013 Clausura runner-up
(Brazil) Brazil; 5 + 1 berths	Atlético Mineiro (Brazil 1; Title holders)	Second stage	2013 Copa Libertadores champion
(Brazil) Brazil; 5 + 1 berths	Cruzeiro (Brazil 2)	Second stage	2013 Campeonato Brasileiro Série A champion
(Brazil) Brazil; 5 + 1 berths	Flamengo (Brazil 3)	Second stage	2013 Copa do Brasil champion
(Brazil) Brazil; 5 + 1 berths	Grêmio (Brazil 4)	Second stage	2013 Campeonato Brasileiro Série A runner-up
(Brazil) Brazil; 5 + 1 berths	Atlético Paranaense (Brazil 5)	First stage	2013 Campeonato Brasileiro Série A 3rd place
(Brazil) Brazil; 5 + 1 berths	Botafogo (Brazil 6)	First stage	2013 Campeonato Brasileiro Série A 4th place
(Chile) Chile; 3 berths	Unión Española (Chile 1)	Second stage	2013 Transición champion
(Chile) Chile; 3 berths	O'Higgins (Chile 2)	Second stage	2013 Apertura champion
(Chile) Chile; 3 berths	Universidad de Chile (Chile 3)	First stage	2013 Apertura Liguilla winner
(Colombia) Colombia; 3 berths	Atlético Nacional (Colombia 1)	Second stage	2013 Apertura champion and 2013 Finalización champion
(Colombia) Colombia; 3 berths	Deportivo Cali (Colombia 2)	Second stage	2013 Primera A aggregate table best team not yet qualified
(Colombia) Colombia; 3 berths	Santa Fe (Colombia 3)	First stage	2013 Primera A aggregate table 2nd best team not yet qualified
(Ecuador) Ecuador; 3 berths	Emelec (Ecuador 1)	Second stage	2013 Serie A champion
(Ecuador) Ecuador; 3 berths	Independiente del Valle (Ecuador 2)	Second stage	2013 Serie A runner-up
(Ecuador) Ecuador; 3 berths	Deportivo Quito (Ecuador 3)	First stage	2013 Serie A aggregate table best team not yet qualified
Mexico (CONCACAF); 3 invitees	Santos Laguna (Mexico 1)	Second stage	2013 Apertura classification phase best team not qualified for 2013–14 CONCACAF Champions League
Mexico (CONCACAF); 3 invitees	León (Mexico 2)	Second stage	2013 Apertura classification phase 2nd best team not qualified for 2013–14 CONCACAF Champions League
Mexico (CONCACAF); 3 invitees	Morelia (Mexico 3)	First stage	2013 Apertura classification phase 3rd best team not qualified for 2013–14 CONCACAF Champions League
(Paraguay) Paraguay; 3 berths	Cerro Porteño (Paraguay 1)	Second stage	2013 Primera División tournament champion with better record in aggregate table
(Paraguay) Paraguay; 3 berths	Nacional (Paraguay 2)	Second stage	2013 Primera División tournament champion with worse record in aggregate table
(Paraguay) Paraguay; 3 berths	Guaraní (Paraguay 3)	First stage	2013 Primera División aggregate table best team not yet qualified
(Peru) Peru; 3 berths	Universitario (Peru 1)	Second stage	2013 Descentralizado champion
(Peru) Peru; 3 berths	Real Garcilaso (Peru 2)	Second stage	2013 Descentralizado runner-up
(Peru) Peru; 3 berths	Sporting Cristal (Peru 3)	First stage	2013 Descentralizado aggregate table best team not yet qualified
(Uruguay) Uruguay; 3 berths	Peñarol (Uruguay 1)	Second stage	2012–13 Primera División champion
(Uruguay) Uruguay; 3 berths	Defensor Sporting (Uruguay 2)	Second stage	2012–13 Primera División runner-up
(Uruguay) Uruguay; 3 berths	Nacional (Uruguay 3)	First stage	2012–13 Primera División aggregate table best team not yet qualified
(Venezuela) Venezuela; 3 berths	Zamora (Venezuela 1)	Second stage	2012–13 Primera División champion
(Venezuela) Venezuela; 3 berths	Deportivo Anzoátegui (Venezuela 2)	Second stage	2012–13 Primera División runner-up
(Venezuela) Venezuela; 3 berths	Caracas (Venezuela 3)	First stage	2012–13 Primera División aggregate table best team not yet qualified

== Draw ==
Location of teams of the 2014 Copa Libertadores from South America.
Location of teams of the 2014 Copa Libertadores from Mexico.

The draw of the tournament was held on December 12, 2013, in Luque, Paraguay.

For the first stage, the 12 teams were drawn into six ties containing a team from Pot 1 and a team from Pot 2, with the former hosting the second leg. The seeding of each team was determined by which associations reached the furthest stage in the previous Copa Libertadores.

Pot 1	Pot 2
(Argentina) Lanús (Brazil) Atlético Paranaense (Brazil) Botafogo (Colombia) Santa Fe (Paraguay) Guaraní (Uruguay) Nacional	(Bolivia) Oriente Petrolero; Universidad de Chile (Ecuador) Deportivo Quito (Mexico) Morelia (Peru) Sporting Cristal (Venezuela) Caracas

For the second stage, the 32 teams were drawn into eight groups of four containing one team from each of the four seeding pots. The seeding of each team was determined by their association and qualifying berth (as per the rotational agreement established by CONMEBOL, the teams which qualified through berths 1 from Colombia, Ecuador, Peru and Venezuela were seeded into Pot 1 for odd-numbered years, while the teams which qualified through berths 1 from Bolivia, Chile, Paraguay and Uruguay were seeded into Pot 1 for even-numbered years). Teams from the same association in Pots 1 and 2 could not be drawn into the same group. However, a first stage winner, whose identity was not known at the time of the draw, could be drawn into the same group with another team from the same association.

Pot 1	Pot 2	Pot 3	Pot 4
(Argentina) Vélez Sarsfield (Argentina) Newell's Old Boys (Brazil) Atlético Mineiro (Brazil) Cruzeiro (Bolivia) Bolívar (Chile) Unión Española (Paraguay) Cerro Porteño (Uruguay) Peñarol	(Argentina) San Lorenzo (Argentina) Arsenal (Brazil) Flamengo (Brazil) Grêmio (Bolivia) The Strongest (Chile) O'Higgins (Paraguay) Nacional (Uruguay) Defensor Sporting	(Colombia) Atlético Nacional (Colombia) Deportivo Cali (Ecuador) Emelec (Ecuador) Independiente del Valle (Peru) Universitario (Peru) Real Garcilaso (Venezuela) Zamora (Venezuela) Deportivo Anzoátegui	(Mexico) Santos Laguna (Mexico) León; First stage winner G1; First stage winner G2; First stage winner G3; First stage winner G4; First stage winner G5; First stage winner G6

== Schedule ==
The schedule of the competition was as follows (all dates listed are Wednesdays, but matches may be played on Tuesdays and Thursdays as well). There was a two-month break between the quarterfinals and semifinals due to the 2014 FIFA World Cup.

Stage	First leg	Second leg
First stage	January 29	February 5
Second stage	February 12, 19, 26; March 12, 19, 26; April 2, 9	
Round of 16	April 16, 23	April 23, 30
Quarterfinals	May 7	May 14
Semifinals	July 23	July 30
Finals	August 6	August 13

== First stage ==
In the first stage, each tie was played on a home-and-away two-legged basis. If tied on aggregate, the away goals rule was used. If still tied, the penalty shoot-out was used to determine the winner (no extra time was played). The winners of each tie advanced to the second stage to join the 26 automatic qualifiers.

Team 1	Agg.	Team 2	1st leg	2nd leg
Sporting Cristal (Peru)	3–3 (4–5 p)	(Brazil) Atlético Paranaense	2–1	1–2
Deportivo Quito (Ecuador)	1–4	(Brazil) Botafogo	1–0	0–4
Universidad de Chile	4–2	(Paraguay) Guaraní	1–0	3–2
Caracas (Venezuela)	0–3	(Argentina) Lanús	0–2	0–1
Morelia (Mexico)	2–2 (a)	(Colombia) Santa Fe	2–1	0–1
Oriente Petrolero (Bolivia)	1–2	(Uruguay) Nacional	1–0	0–2

== Second stage ==
In the second stage, each group was played on a home-and-away round-robin basis. Each team earned 3 points for a win, 1 point for a draw, and 0 points for a loss. If tied on points, the following criteria were used to determine the ranking: 1. Goal difference; 2. Goals scored; 3. Away goals scored; 4. Drawing of lots. The winners and runners-up of each group advanced to the round of 16.

=== Group 1 ===
Pos	Team	Pld	W	D	L	GF	GA	GD	Pts	VEL	STR	CAP	UNI
1	(Argentina) Vélez Sarsfield	6	5	0	1	9	3	+6	15		2–0	2–0	1–0
2	(Bolivia) The Strongest	6	3	1	2	8	7	+1	10	2–0		2–1	1–0
3	(Brazil) Atlético Paranaense	6	3	0	3	7	7	0	9	1–3	1–0		3–0
4	(Peru) Universitario	6	0	1	5	3	10	−7	1	0–1	3–3	0–1	

Legend: Blue = home team win; Yellow = draw; Red = away team win.

=== Group 2 ===
Pos	Team	Pld	W	D	L	GF	GA	GD	Pts	UES	SLO	IDV	BOT
1	(Chile) Unión Española	6	2	3	1	10	9	+1	9		1–0	4–5	1–1
2	(Argentina) San Lorenzo	6	2	2	2	6	5	+1	8	1–1		1–0	3–0
3	(Ecuador) Independiente del Valle	6	2	2	2	10	10	0	8	2–2	1–1		2–1
4	(Brazil) Botafogo	6	2	1	3	5	7	−2	7	0–1	2–0	1–0	

Legend: Blue = home team win; Yellow = draw; Red = away team win.

=== Group 3 ===
Pos	Team	Pld	W	D	L	GF	GA	GD	Pts	CER	LAN	OHI	CAL
1	(Paraguay) Cerro Porteño	6	3	1	2	10	9	+1	10		3–1	2–1	3–2
2	(Argentina) Lanús	6	2	2	2	6	5	+1	8	2–0		0–0	2–0
3	(Chile) O'Higgins	6	1	4	1	5	5	0	7	2–2	0–0		1–0
4	(Colombia) Deportivo Cali	6	2	1	3	6	8	−2	7	1–0	2–1	1–1	

Legend: Blue = home team win; Yellow = draw; Red = away team win.

=== Group 4 ===
Pos	Team	Pld	W	D	L	GF	GA	GD	Pts	CAM	NAC	ZAM	SAN
1	(Brazil) Atlético Mineiro	6	3	3	0	8	5	+3	12		1–1	1–0	2–1
2	(Paraguay) Nacional	6	2	2	2	8	10	−2	8	2–2		1–0	3–2
3	(Venezuela) Zamora	6	2	1	3	6	6	0	7	0–1	2–0		2–1
4	(Colombia) Santa Fe	6	1	2	3	10	11	−1	5	1–1	3–1	2–2	

Legend: Blue = home team win; Yellow = draw; Red = away team win.

=== Group 5 ===
Pos	Team	Pld	W	D	L	GF	GA	GD	Pts	DEF	CRU	UCH	GAR
1	(Uruguay) Defensor Sporting	6	3	2	1	11	5	+6	11		2–0	1–1	4–1
2	(Brazil) Cruzeiro	6	3	1	2	13	7	+6	10	2–2		5–1	3–0
3	Universidad de Chile	6	3	1	2	6	9	−3	10	1–0	0–2		1–0
4	(Peru) Real Garcilaso	6	1	0	5	4	13	−9	3	0–2	2–1	1–2	

Legend: Blue = home team win; Yellow = draw; Red = away team win.

=== Group 6 ===
Pos	Team	Pld	W	D	L	GF	GA	GD	Pts	GRE	ATL	NOB	NAC
1	(Brazil) Grêmio	6	4	2	0	8	1	+7	14		3–0	0–0	1–0
2	(Colombia) Atlético Nacional	6	3	1	2	7	8	−1	10	0–2		1–0	2–2
3	(Argentina) Newell's Old Boys	6	2	2	2	10	7	+3	8	1–1	1–3		4–0
4	(Uruguay) Nacional	6	0	1	5	4	13	−9	1	0–1	0–1	2–4	

Legend: Blue = home team win; Yellow = draw; Red = away team win.

=== Group 7 ===
Pos	Team	Pld	W	D	L	GF	GA	GD	Pts	BOL	LEO	FLA	EME
1	(Bolivia) Bolívar	6	3	2	1	8	6	+2	11		1–1	1–0	2–1
2	(Mexico) León	6	3	1	2	10	7	+3	10	0–1		2–1	3–0
3	(Brazil) Flamengo	6	2	1	3	10	10	0	7	2–2	2–3		3–1
4	(Ecuador) Emelec	6	2	0	4	7	12	−5	6	2–1	2–1	1–2	

Legend: Blue = home team win; Yellow = draw; Red = away team win.

=== Group 8 ===
Pos	Team	Pld	W	D	L	GF	GA	GD	Pts	SLA	ARS	PEN	ANZ
1	(Mexico) Santos Laguna	6	4	1	1	11	5	+6	13		1–0	4–1	3–0
2	(Argentina) Arsenal	6	4	0	2	11	4	+7	12	3–0		1–0	3–0
3	(Uruguay) Peñarol	6	1	2	3	5	10	−5	5	0–2	2–1		1–1
4	(Venezuela) Deportivo Anzoátegui	6	0	3	3	4	12	−8	3	1–1	1–3	1–1	

Legend: Blue = home team win; Yellow = draw; Red = away team win.

== Knockout stages ==
In the knockout stages, the 16 teams played a single-elimination tournament, with the following rules:

- Each tie was played on a home-and-away two-legged basis, with the higher-seeded team hosting the second leg. However, CONMEBOL required that the second leg of the finals must be played in South America, i.e., a finalist from Mexico had to host the first leg regardless of seeding.
- In the round of 16, quarterfinals, and semifinals, if tied on aggregate, the away goals rule was used. If still tied, a penalty shoot-out was used to determine the winner (no extra time was played).
- In the finals, if tied on aggregate, the away goals rule was not used, and 30 minutes of extra time were played. If still tied after extra time, a penalty shoot-out was used to determine the winner.
- If there were two semifinalists from the same association, they had to play each other.

=== Seeding ===
The qualified teams were seeded in the knockout stages according to their results in the second stage, with the group winners seeded 1–8, and the group runners-up seeded 9–16.

Seed	Team	Pld	W	D	L	GF	GA	GD	Pts	Status
1	(Argentina) Vélez Sarsfield	6	5	0	1	9	3	+6	15	Group winners (Seeds 1–8)
2	(Brazil) Grêmio	6	4	2	0	8	1	+7	14	Group winners (Seeds 1–8)
3	(Mexico) Santos Laguna	6	4	1	1	11	5	+6	13	Group winners (Seeds 1–8)
4	(Brazil) Atlético Mineiro	6	3	3	0	8	5	+3	12	Group winners (Seeds 1–8)
5	(Uruguay) Defensor Sporting	6	3	2	1	11	5	+6	11	Group winners (Seeds 1–8)
6	(Bolivia) Bolívar	6	3	2	1	8	6	+2	11	Group winners (Seeds 1–8)
7	(Paraguay) Cerro Porteño	6	3	1	2	10	9	+1	10	Group winners (Seeds 1–8)
8	(Chile) Unión Española	6	2	3	1	10	9	+1	9	Group winners (Seeds 1–8)
9	(Argentina) Arsenal	6	4	0	2	11	4	+7	12	Group runners-up (Seeds 9–16)
10	(Brazil) Cruzeiro	6	3	1	2	13	7	+6	10	Group runners-up (Seeds 9–16)
11	(Mexico) León	6	3	1	2	10	7	+3	10	Group runners-up (Seeds 9–16)
12	(Bolivia) The Strongest	6	3	1	2	8	7	+1	10	Group runners-up (Seeds 9–16)
13	(Colombia) Atlético Nacional	6	3	1	2	7	8	−1	10	Group runners-up (Seeds 9–16)
14	(Argentina) Lanús	6	2	2	2	6	5	+1	8	Group runners-up (Seeds 9–16)
15	(Argentina) San Lorenzo	6	2	2	2	6	5	+1	8	Group runners-up (Seeds 9–16)
16	(Paraguay) Nacional	6	2	2	2	8	10	−2	8	Group runners-up (Seeds 9–16)

Rules for classification: 1. Higher position in group; 2. Points; 3. Goal difference; 4. Goals scored; 5. Away goals scored; 6. Drawing of lots.

=== Bracket ===
Round of 16
16	(Paraguay) Nacional	1	2	3
1	(Argentina) Vélez Sarsfield	0	2	2
9	(Argentina) Arsenal	0	1	1
8	(Chile) Unión Española	0	0	0
13	(Colombia) Atlético Nacional	1	1	2
4	(Brazil) Atlético Mineiro	0	1	1
12	(Bolivia) The Strongest	2	0	2 (2)
5	(Uruguay) Defensor Sporting (p)	0	2	2 (4)
15	(Argentina) San Lorenzo (p)	1	0	1 (4)
2	(Brazil) Grêmio	0	1	1 (2)
10	(Brazil) Cruzeiro	1	2	3
7	(Paraguay) Cerro Porteño	1	0	1
14	(Argentina) Lanús	2	2	4
3	(Mexico) Santos Laguna	1	0	1
11	(Mexico) León	2	1	3
6	(Bolivia) Bolívar (a)	2	1	3

Quarterfinals
16	(Paraguay) Nacional	1	0	1
9	(Argentina) Arsenal	0	0	0
13	(Colombia) Atlético Nacional	0	0	0
5	(Uruguay) Defensor Sporting	2	1	3
15	(Argentina) San Lorenzo	1	1	2
10	(Brazil) Cruzeiro	0	1	1
14	(Argentina) Lanús	1	0	1
6	(Bolivia) Bolívar	1	1	2

Semifinals
16	(Paraguay) Nacional	2	0	2
5	(Uruguay) Defensor Sporting	0	1	1
15	(Argentina) San Lorenzo	5	0	5
6	(Bolivia) Bolívar	0	1	1

Finals
16	(Paraguay) Nacional	1	0	1
15	(Argentina) San Lorenzo	1	1	2

=== Round of 16 ===
Team 1	Agg.	Team 2	1st leg	2nd leg
Nacional (Paraguay)	3–2	(Argentina) Vélez Sarsfield	1–0	2–2
San Lorenzo (Argentina)	1–1 (4–2 p)	(Brazil) Grêmio	1–0	0–1
Lanús (Argentina)	4–1	(Mexico) Santos Laguna	2–1	2–0
Atlético Nacional (Colombia)	2–1	(Brazil) Atlético Mineiro	1–0	1–1
The Strongest (Bolivia)	2–2 (2–4 p)	(Uruguay) Defensor Sporting	2–0	0–2
León (Mexico)	3–3 (a)	(Bolivia) Bolívar	2–2	1–1
Cruzeiro (Brazil)	3–1	(Paraguay) Cerro Porteño	1–1	2–0
Arsenal (Argentina)	1–0	(Chile) Unión Española	0–0	1–0

=== Quarterfinals ===
Team 1	Agg.	Team 2	1st leg	2nd leg
Nacional (Paraguay)	1–0	(Argentina) Arsenal	1–0	0–0
San Lorenzo (Argentina)	2–1	(Brazil) Cruzeiro	1–0	1–1
Lanús (Argentina)	1–2	(Bolivia) Bolívar	1–1	0–1
Atlético Nacional (Colombia)	0–3	(Uruguay) Defensor Sporting	0–2	0–1

=== Semifinals ===
Team 1	Agg.	Team 2	1st leg	2nd leg
Nacional (Paraguay)	2–1	(Uruguay) Defensor Sporting	2–0	0–1
San Lorenzo (Argentina)	5–1	(Bolivia) Bolívar	5–0	0–1

=== Finals ===
The finals were played on a home-and-away two-legged basis, with the higher-seeded team hosting the second leg. If tied on aggregate, the away goals rule was not used, and 30 minutes of extra time were played. If still tied after extra time, a penalty shoot-out was used to determine the winner.

August 6, 2014
20:15 UTC−4

Nacional (Paraguay)	1–1	(Argentina) San Lorenzo
Santa Cruz 90+2'	Report	Matos 64'

Estadio Defensores del Chaco, Asunción
Referee: Wilmar Roldán (Colombia)

August 13, 2014
21:15 UTC−3

San Lorenzo (Argentina)	1–0	(Paraguay) Nacional
Ortigoza 35' (pen.)	Report

Estadio Pedro Bidegain, Buenos Aires
Referee: Sandro Ricci (Brazil)

San Lorenzo won 2–1 on aggregate.

== Statistics ==
=== Top goalscorers ===
Rank	Player	Team	Goals
1	(Paraguay) Julio dos Santos	(Paraguay) Cerro Porteño	5
1	(Uruguay) Nicolás Olivera	(Uruguay) Defensor Sporting	5
3	(Ecuador) Daniel Angulo	(Ecuador) Independiente del Valle	4
3	(Argentina) Mauro Boselli	(Mexico) León	4
3	(Brazil) Bruno Rodrigo	(Brazil) Cruzeiro	4
3	(Spain) Juanmi Callejón	(Bolivia) Bolívar	4
3	(Chile) Gustavo Canales	(Chile) Unión Española	4
3	(Argentina) Luis Miguel Escalada	(Ecuador) Emelec	4
3	(Venezuela) Juan Manuel Falcón	(Venezuela) Zamora	4
3	(Brazil) Felipe Gedoz	(Uruguay) Defensor Sporting	4
3	(Brazil) Jô	(Brazil) Atlético Mineiro	4
3	(Argentina) Omar Pérez	(Colombia) Santa Fe	4
3	(Brazil) Ricardo Goulart	(Brazil) Cruzeiro	4
3	(Ecuador) Junior Sornoza	(Ecuador) Independiente del Valle	4
3	(Brazil) Wallyson	(Brazil) Botafogo	4

=== Team of the Season ===
Position	Player	Team
Goalkeeper	(Argentina) Ignacio Don	(Paraguay) Nacional
Defenders	(Argentina) Emmanuel Mas	(Argentina) San Lorenzo
Defenders	(Argentina) Santiago Gentiletti	(Argentina) San Lorenzo
Defenders	(Colombia) Stefan Medina	(Colombia) Atlético Nacional
Defenders	(Argentina) Julio Buffarini	(Argentina) San Lorenzo
Midfielders	(Paraguay) Silvio Torales	(Paraguay) Nacional
Midfielders	(Argentina) Juan Ignacio Mercier	(Argentina) San Lorenzo
Midfielders	(Colombia) Sherman Cárdenas	(Colombia) Atlético Nacional
Forwards	(Argentina) Ignacio Piatti	(Argentina) San Lorenzo
Forwards	(Uruguay) Nicolás Olivera	(Uruguay) Defensor Sporting
Forwards	(Uruguay) William Ferreira	(Bolivia) Bolívar

== See also ==
- 2014 FIFA Club World Cup
- 2014 Copa Sudamericana
- 2015 Recopa Sudamericana
