= Diego Santa Cruz =

Paraguayan footballer (born 1982)

Personal information
- Full name: Diego Anibal Santa Cruz Cantero
- Date of birth: 29 October 1982 (age 44)
- Place of birth: Asunción, Paraguay
- Height: 1.82 m (6 ft 0 in)
- Position: Midfielder

Youth career
- 1998–2001: Olimpia Asunción

Senior career*
Years	Team	Apps	(Gls)
2000	Cerro Corá		(3)
2001–2003	Olimpia Asunción		
2003–2004	Cerro Corá		(6)
2004	NK Zadar		
2004	Olimpia Asunción		
2005	Sportivo Luqueño		

International career^{‡}
1999	Paraguay U17	2	(0)
2001	Paraguay U20		
- * Club domestic league appearances and goals as of 7 February 2009 ‡ National team caps and goals as of 1 July 2008

Diego Anibal Santa Cruz Cantero (born 29 October 1982) is a Paraguayan former professional footballer who played as a midfielder.

== Career ==
In 2000, Santa Cruz played for Cerro Corá scoring 3 league goals.

In September 2003, Santa Cruz scored for Cerro Corá in a 1–0 home victory against Universal Encarnación in Paraguay's Division Intermedia.

In the 2004 season, Santa Cruz scored 5 league goals.

He has played for NK Zadar and Sportivo Luqueño.

== International career ==
In 1999, Santa Cruz was member of the Paraguay national under-17 football team and was selected as part of the 23-man squad for the 1999 FIFA U-17 World Championship.

In 2001, Santa Cruz was part of the Paraguay national under-20 football team.

== Personal life ==
Diego is the younger brother of the striker Roque Santa Cruz, and older brother of Julio Santa Cruz.
