= Fabricio Fontanini =

Argentine footballer (born 1990)

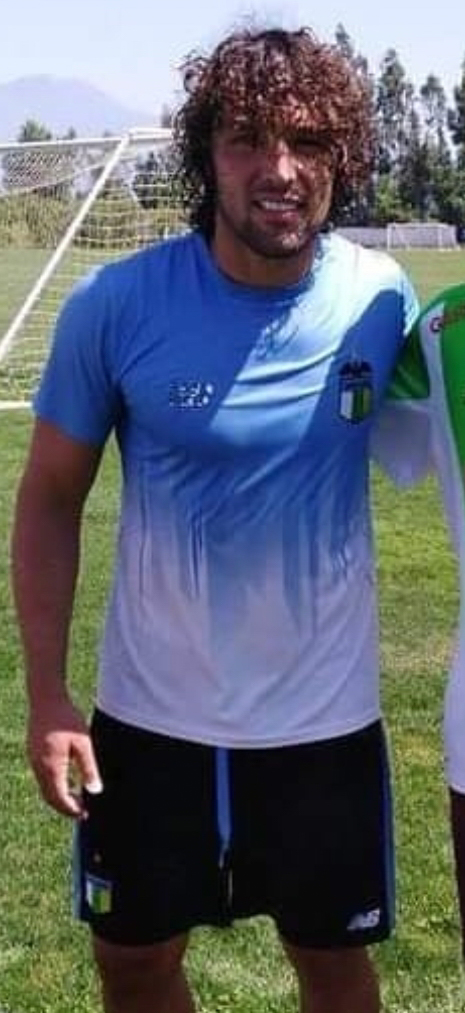
- Fontanini with Atlético Rafaela in 2011

Personal information
- Full name: Fabricio Bautista Fontanini
- Date of birth: 30 March 1990 (age 36)
- Place of birth: Rafaela, Argentina
- Height: 1.80 m (5 ft 11 in)
- Position: Centre-back

Team information
- Current team: Atlético Rafaela

Youth career
- Atlético Rafaela

Senior career*
Years	Team	Apps	(Gls)
2008–2013	Atlético Rafaela	134	(9)
2010–2011	→ Quilmes (loan)	35	(0)
2013–2016	San Lorenzo	26	(0)
2016	Vicenza	1	(0)
2017	O'Higgins	26	(2)
2018	→ Newell's Old Boys (loan)	35	(2)
2019–2020	Newell's Old Boys	8	(2)
2021	Ñublense	2	(0)
2021	Aucas	15	(0)
2022–	Atlético Rafaela	10	(0)
- * Club domestic league appearances and goals as of 17:31, 16 June 2022 (UTC)

Fabricio Bautista Fontanini (born 30 March 1990) is an Argentine professional footballer. He plays as a right-footed centre-back for Atlético de Rafaela.

On 11 July 2013, he swapped his old club Atlético de Rafaela for San Lorenzo.

On 28 July 2016, Fontanini was signed by Italian Serie B club Vicenza Calcio. On 17 November he was released.

== Honours ==
San Lorenzo

- Argentine Primera División: 2013 Inicial
- Copa Libertadores: 2014
