= Greg Lusardi =

American football coach (born c. 1953)

Biographical details
- Born: c. 1953 (age 72–73)
- Education: Slippery Rock State College (1975); Montclair State University (1985)

Playing career
- 1974–1975: Slippery Rock

Coaching career (HC unless noted)
- 1976: Slippery Rock (assistant)
- 1977–1983: Morris Catholic HS (NJ) (assistant)
- 1984–1987: Morris Catholic HS (NJ)
- 1988: Defiance (OC)
- 1989–1993: William Paterson (AHC/DC)
- 1994–2004: Pace
- 2005–2013: Morris Catholic HS (NJ)
- 2014–2016: William Paterson (LB)
- 2017: William Paterson (OL)
- 2018: William Paterson (LB)
- 2019–2021: William Paterson (RB)
- 2022–2024: William Paterson (OL)

Head coaching record
- Overall: 42–68 (college)

Gregory Lusardi (born c. 1953) is an American college football coach. He was the head football coach for Pace University from 2004 to 1994 and Morris Catholic High School from 1984 to 1987 and 2005 to 2013. He also coached for Slippery Rock, Defiance, and William Paterson. He played college football for Slippery Rock.

== Head coaching record ==
=== College ===
Year	Team	Overall	Conference	Standing	Bowl/playoffs
Pace Setters (NCAA Division II independent) (1994–1996)
1994	Pace	2–8			
1995	Pace	6–4			
1996	Pace	6–4			
Pace Setters (Eastern Football Conference) (1997–2000)
1997	Pace	4–5	3–4	5th (Atlantic)	
1998	Pace	5–5	3–5	T–4th (Atlantic)	
1999	Pace	6–4	5–3	2nd (Central)	
2000	Pace	4–6	4–4	2nd (Central)	
Pace Setters (Northeast-10 Conference) (2001–2004)
2001	Pace	4–5	4–5	T–7th	
2002	Pace	3–7	3–7	T–8th	
2003	Pace	2–8	2–7	T–7th	
2004	Pace	0–10	0–9	10th	
Pace:		42–68	24–44		
Total:		42–68			
