= 2014 Copa Libertadores first stage =

The first stage of the 2014 Copa Libertadores de América was played from January 28 to February 6, 2014. A total of 12 teams competed in the first stage. The six winners advanced to the second stage to join the 26 other teams.

== Draw ==
The draw of the tournament was held on December 12, 2013, 21:00 UTC−3, at the CONMEBOL Convention Centre in Luque, Paraguay.

For the first stage, the 12 teams were drawn into six ties containing a team from Pot 1 and a team from Pot 2, with the former hosting the second leg. The seeding of each team was determined by which associations reached the furthest stage in the previous Copa Libertadores.

== Seeding ==
The following were the seeding of the 12 teams entered into the first stage draw:

Pot 1	Pot 2
(Argentina) Lanús (Brazil) Atlético Paranaense (Brazil) Botafogo (Colombia) Santa Fe (Paraguay) Guaraní (Uruguay) Nacional	(Bolivia) Oriente Petrolero; Universidad de Chile (Ecuador) Deportivo Quito (Mexico) Morelia (Peru) Sporting Cristal (Venezuela) Caracas

== Format ==
In the first stage, each tie was played on a home-and-away two-legged basis. If tied on aggregate, the away goals rule was used. If still tied, the penalty shoot-out was used to determine the winner (no extra time was played). The winners of each tie advanced to the second stage to join the 26 automatic qualifiers.

== Matches ==
The first legs were played on January 28–30, and the second legs were played on February 4–6, 2014.

Team 1	Agg.	Team 2	1st leg	2nd leg
Sporting Cristal (Peru)	3–3 (4–5 p)	(Brazil) Atlético Paranaense	2–1	1–2
Deportivo Quito (Ecuador)	1–4	(Brazil) Botafogo	1–0	0–4
Universidad de Chile	4–2	(Paraguay) Guaraní	1–0	3–2
Caracas (Venezuela)	0–3	(Argentina) Lanús	0–2	0–1
Morelia (Mexico)	2–2 (a)	(Colombia) Santa Fe	2–1	0–1
Oriente Petrolero (Bolivia)	1–2	(Uruguay) Nacional	1–0	0–2

=== Match G1 ===
January 29, 2014
19:00 UTC−5

Sporting Cristal (Peru)	2–1	(Brazil) Atlético Paranaense
Ávila 29'; Lobatón 61' (pen.)	Report	Éderson 54' (pen.)

Estadio Nacional, Lima
Attendance: 23,752
Referee: Enrique Osses (Chile)

February 5, 2014
22:00 UTC−2

Atlético Paranaense (Brazil)	2–1	(Peru) Sporting Cristal
Manoel 61'; Éderson 90+7' (pen.)	Report	Ávila 62'
Penalties
Éderson (penalty scored); Deivid (penalty missed); Mérida (penalty scored); Nathan (penalty missed); Natanael (penalty scored); Mosquito (penalty scored); Manoel (penalty scored)	5–4	(penalty scored) Lobatón; (penalty scored) Cazulo; (penalty scored) Advíncula; (penalty missed) Delgado; (penalty missed) Calcaterra; (penalty scored) Núñez; (penalty missed) Aquino

Estádio Vila Capanema, Curitiba
Attendance: 9,156
Referee: Antonio Arias (Paraguay)

Tied 3–3 on aggregate, Atlético Paranaense won on penalties.

=== Match G2 ===
January 29, 2014
19:00 UTC−5

Deportivo Quito (Ecuador)	1–0	(Brazil) Botafogo
Estupiñán 18'	Report

Estadio Olímpico Atahualpa, Quito
Attendance: 4,123
Referee: Wilmar Roldán (Colombia)

February 5, 2014
22:00 UTC−2

Botafogo (Brazil)	4–0	(Ecuador) Deportivo Quito
Wallyson 36', 66', 79'; Henrique 90'	Report

Estádio do Maracanã, Rio de Janeiro
Attendance: 45,154
Referee: Silvio Trucco (Argentina)

Botafogo won 4–1 on aggregate.

=== Match G3 ===
January 30, 2014
20:00 UTC−3

Universidad de Chile	1–0	(Paraguay) Guaraní
Mora 63'	Report

Estadio Nacional Julio Martínez Prádanos, Santiago
Attendance: 34,569
Referee: Martín Vázquez (Uruguay)

February 6, 2014
19:30 UTC−3

Guaraní (Paraguay)	2–3	Universidad de Chile
F. Fernández 39'; J. D. Benítez 64'	Report	R. Fernández 52'; Díaz 74'; Rubio 90+1'

Estadio Defensores del Chaco, Asunción
Attendance: 4,410
Referee: Pablo Díaz (Argentina)

Universidad de Chile won 4–2 on aggregate.

=== Match G4 ===
January 30, 2014
20:45 UTC−4:30

Caracas (Venezuela)	0–2	(Argentina) Lanús
	Report	Goltz 18', 86' (pen.)

Estadio Olímpico de la UCV, Caracas
Attendance: 12,602
Referee: Víctor Carrillo (Peru)

February 6, 2014
22:00 UTC−3

Lanús (Argentina)	1–0	(Venezuela) Caracas
Ayala 70'	Report

Estadio Ciudad de Lanús, Lanús
Attendance: 19,789
Referee: Sandro Ricci (Brazil)

Lanús won 3–0 on aggregate.

=== Match G5 ===
January 28, 2014
19:15 UTC−6

Morelia (Mexico)	2–1	(Colombia) Santa Fe
Mancilla 26'; Zamorano 65'	Report	Pérez 84'

Estadio Morelos, Morelia
Attendance: 24,031
Referee: Juan Soto (Venezuela)

February 4, 2014
20:30 UTC−5

Santa Fe (Colombia)	1–0	(Mexico) Morelia
De la Cuesta 58'	Report

Estadio El Campín, Bogotá
Attendance: 27,566
Referee: Raúl Orosco (Bolivia)

Tied 2–2 on aggregate, Santa Fe won on away goals.

=== Match G6 ===
January 28, 2014
19:00 UTC−4

Oriente Petrolero (Bolivia)	1–0	(Uruguay) Nacional
Mojica 32'	Report

Estadio Ramón Tahuichi Aguilera, Santa Cruz
Attendance: 19,884
Referee: Enrique Cáceres (Paraguay)

February 4, 2014
21:00 UTC−2

Nacional (Uruguay)	2–0	(Bolivia) Oriente Petrolero
I. Alonso 18'; De Pena 73'	Report

Estadio Gran Parque Central, Montevideo
Attendance: 23,991
Referee: Carlos Vera (Ecuador)

Nacional won 2–1 on aggregate.
