= Ramón Coronel =

Paraguayan footballer (born 1991)

Personal information
- Full name: Ramón David Coronel Gómez
- Date of birth: 31 March 1991 (age 35)
- Place of birth: Capiatá, Paraguay
- Height: 1.72 m (5 ft 8 in)
- Position: Right back

Team information
- Current team: 12 de Octubre

Youth career
- 2005–2009: Cerro Porteño

Senior career*
Years	Team	Apps	(Gls)
2010–2011	Deportivo Capiatá	31	(2)
2012–2017	Nacional	142	(3)
2017–2019	Olimpia	6	(0)
2017	→ Trinidense (loan)	15	(0)
2019	→ Luqueño (loan)	27	(1)
2020	Vila Nova	1	(0)
2021–	12 de Octubre	12	(0)

International career
2014	Paraguay	2	(0)
- * Club domestic league appearances and goals as of 19:36, 7 July 2021 (UTC)

Ramón David Coronel Gómez (born 31 March 1991) is a Paraguayan footballer who plays for 12 de Octubre in the Paraguayan Primera División.

== Career ==
Coronel plays for Club Nacional. He made his international debut in a match against Cameroon in May 2014.
