= José Cáceres =

Paraguayan footballer (born 1985)

José Leonardo Cáceres
Personal information
- Full name: José Leonardo Cáceres Ovelar
- Date of birth: 28 April 1985 (age 41)
- Place of birth: Fernando de la Mora, Paraguay
- Height: 1.88 m (6 ft 2 in)
- Positions: Centre back; sweeper

Senior career*
Years	Team	Apps	(Gls)
2005–2006	Independiente FBC	5	(0)
2006–2007	Resistencia	13	(0)
2007	Silvio Pettirossi	44	(2)
2007	Sportivo Trinidense	23	(0)
2008	Deportes Tolima	12	(0)
2009–2011	Sportivo Trinidense	33	(3)
2012–2015	Nacional	91	(0)
2015–2016	→ Colo-Colo (loan)	15	(0)
2016–2017	Cerro Porteño	14	(0)
2018	Deportivo Liberación	11	(0)
- * Club domestic league appearances and goals

José Leonardo Cáceres Ovelar (born 28 April 1985), also known as Leonardo Cáceres, is a Paraguayan former footballer who played as a centre back.

== Club career ==
Cáceres has played club football for Independiente de Campo Grande, Resistencia SC, Pettirossi, Sportivo Trinidense, Nacional, Colo-Colo and Cerro Porteño.

== International career ==
He was called to be international with Paraguay in 2013.
