= Juan Falcón (footballer) =

Venezuelan footballer (born 1989)

Personal information
- Full name: Juan Manuel Falcón Jiménez
- Date of birth: 24 February 1989 (age 37)
- Place of birth: Acarigua, Venezuela
- Height: 1.79 m (5 ft 10 in)
- Position: Striker

Youth career
- Simón Rodríguez de Acarigua
- 2003–2006: Portuguesa

Senior career*
| Years | Team | Apps | (Gls) |
| 2006–2007 | Portuguesa | | |
| 2007–2010 | Llaneros de Guanare | 63 | (14) |
| 2010 | → Mineros (loan) | 8 | (1) |
| 2010–2012 | Trujillanos | 42 | (6) |
| 2012–2014 | Zamora | 62 | (36) |
| 2014–2016 | Metz | 32 | (5) |
| 2015 | Metz II | 4 | (2) |
| 2016 | → Al-Fateh (loan) | 11 | (2) |
| 2016 | Santa Fe | 13 | (2) |
| 2017 | Zamora | 13 | (5) |
| 2018 | ACD Lara | 16 | (5) |

International career
| 2008–2015 | Venezuela | 6 | (0) |
- * Club domestic league appearances and goals

Juan Manuel Falcón Jiménez (born 24 February 1989) is a Venezuelan retired professional footballer who played as a striker.

== Club career ==
=== Portuguesa FC ===
His first steps in professional football were in Portuguesa FC, where he started playing as a midfielder. Later on, he passed over several field positions until reaching the forward spot.

Falcón scored his first professional goal in a Copa Venezuela match against Zamora FC, which eventually would be his last destination in the local league after a small period in Trujillanos FC.

=== Zamora ===
With Zamora, he won the league two times in a row and he became the top goalscorer in the league with 19 goals.

=== FC Metz ===
In mid 2014, he signed a three-year contract with French team FC Metz, in a transfer reported to be around €800,000. He left the club in 2016.

=== Retirement ===
After two years without a club, Falcón confirmed on 17 January 2020, that he had retired at the age of 30 due to a knee injury.

== International career ==
He made his debut on 23 March 2008, coming as a substitute against El Salvador.

== Honours ==
=== Club ===
Trujillanos

- Copa Venezuela: 2010

Zamora

- Venezuelan Primera División: 2012–13, 2013–14

=== Individual ===
- Venezuelan Primera División top goalscorer: 2013–14, 19 Goals
