= Marcos Riveros =

Paraguayan footballer (born 1988)

Riveros
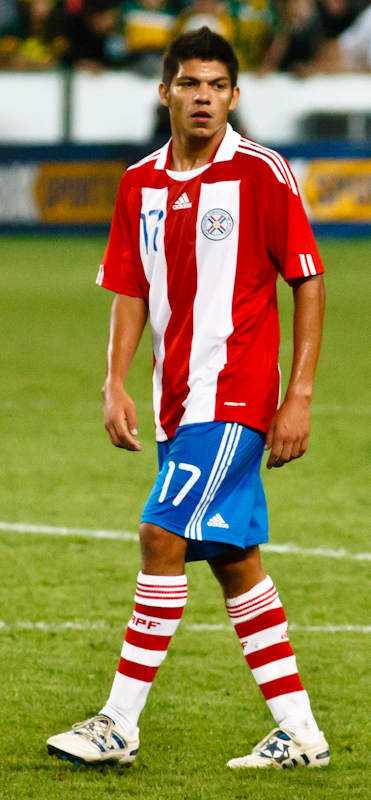

Personal information
- Full name: Marcos Antonio Riveros Krayacich
- Date of birth: 4 September 1988 (age 38)
- Place of birth: Asunción, Paraguay
- Height: 1.79 m (5 ft 10 1/2 in)
- Position: Midfielder

Team information
- Current team: Sportivo Trinidense
- Number: 28

Youth career
- Guaraní

Senior career*
Years	Team	Apps	(Gls)
2007	Guaraní	1	(0)
2007–2020	Nacional Asunción	252	(8)
2011	→ Newell's Old Boys (loan)	3	(0)
2016–2017	→ Cerro Porteño (loan)	63	(3)
2018	→ Sportivo Luqueño (loan)	38	(1)
2020	Sportivo Luqueño	15	(0)
2021–	Sportivo Trinidense		

International career
2010–2017	Paraguay	18	(1)
- * Club domestic league appearances and goals as of 19:53, 23 January 2024 (UTC)

Marcos Antonio Riveros Krayacich (born 4 September 1988) is a Paraguayan footballer who plays for Sportivo Trinidense as a midfielder.

== International goals ==
#	Date	Venue	Opponent	Score	Result	Competition
1	17 November 2010	So Kon Po	Hong Kong	7-0	Win	Friendly match
