= Marcos Melgarejo =

Paraguayan footballer (born 1986)

Personal information
- Full name: Marcos Benjamín Melgarejo Martínez
- Date of birth: 3 October 1986 (age 40)
- Place of birth: Asunción, Paraguay
- Height: 1.79 m (5 ft 10 in)
- Position: Midfielder

Team information
- Current team: Deportivo Capiatá
- Number: 14

Senior career*
Years	Team	Apps	(Gls)
2008–2011	Nacional Asunción	145	(22)
2012	Libertad	7	(0)
2012–2015	Nacional Asunción	110	(24)
2016	Deportes Tolima	10	(0)
2016	Sol de América	11	(0)
2018	Deportivo Capiatá	6	(0)
2018	Sportivo Trinidense	?	(?)
2019–	Independiente Campo Grande	?	(?)

International career
2009–2011	Paraguay	2	(0)
- * Club domestic league appearances and goals as of 4 April 2018

Marcos Benjamín Melgarejo Martínez (born 3 October 1986) is a Paraguayan international footballer who plays for Independiente Campo Grande as a midfielder.

== Career ==
Born in Asunción, Melgarejo has played football for Nacional and Libertad.

He made his international debut for Paraguay in 2009.
