= Hugo Lusardi =

Paraguayan footballer (1982–2022)

Personal information
- Full name: Hugo Américo Lusardi Morínigo
- Date of birth: 17 August 1982
- Place of birth: Coronel Oviedo, Paraguay
- Date of death: 15 August 2022 (aged 39)
- Height: 1.68 m (5 ft 6 in)
- Position: Midfielder

Senior career*
Years	Team	Apps	(Gls)
2004	Sportivo Luqueño		
2004	General Caballero		
2005–2006	3 de Febrero		
2006–2008	Libertad		
2006–2007	→ Tacuary (loan)		
2009–2011	Sportivo Luqueño	18	(5)
2010	→ Olimpia Asunción (loan)	9	(0)
2011	Nacional Asunción	19	(2)
2011–2013	Cobreloa	27	(7)
2012	→ Palestino (loan)	10	(0)
2012	→ Rubio Ñu (loan)	17	(7)
2013	Deportes Tolima	11	(2)
2014–2015	Nacional Asunción	31	(3)
2015	Sol de América	15	(0)
2015–2016	Rubio Ñu	35	(0)
2016–2017	Deportivo Capiatá	26	(3)
2017	Rubio Ñu	16	(1)
2018-2019	Deportivo Capiatá	25	(2)
2021	Tembetary		
- * Club domestic league appearances and goals

Hugo Américo Lusardi Morínigo (17 August 1982 – 15 August 2022) was a Paraguayan professional footballer who played as midfielder.

Lusardi died of cancer on 15 August 2022, at age 39.

== Honours ==
Libertad

- Paraguayan Primera División: 2008 Apertura, 2008 Clausura

Nacional

- Paraguayan Primera División: 2011 Apertura

Cobreloa

- Primera División de Chile: runner-up 2011 Clausura
