= Juan Mercier =

Argentine footballer (born 1980)

Personal information
- Full name: Juan Ignacio Mercier
- Date of birth: February 2, 1980 (age 46)
- Place of birth: Campana, Argentina
- Height: 1.81 m (5 ft 11 in)
- Positions: Attacking midfielder; striker

Youth career
- Flandria

Senior career*
Years	Team	Apps	(Gls)
2000–2002	Flandria	57	(5)
2002–2004	Deportivo Morón	78	(4)
2004–2005	Tristán Suárez	38	(3)
2005–2007	Platense	73	(6)
2007–2011	Argentinos Juniors	120	(5)
2011–2012	Al Nassr	10	(0)
2012	Al Wasl	9	(0)
2012–2018	San Lorenzo	102	(1)
2018–2019	Atlético Tucumán	22	(0)
2019–2020	San Martín Tucumán	20	(0)
2020–2021	Mitre	2	(0)
2021	Sacachispas	11	(0)
2021	FADEP		
2022	Fénix de Pilar	10	(0)

International career
2010	Argentina	3	(0)
- * Club domestic league appearances and goals

Juan Ignacio Mercier (born 2 February 1980) is a retired Argentine footballer, who played as a midfielder.

== Career ==
=== Club career ===
Mercier started his playing career in the lower leagues of Argentine football in 2000. He played for four clubs in the regionalised 3rd division, eventually helping Platense to win promotion to Primera B Nacional in 2006.

Mercier joined Argentinos Juniors in 2007, making top flight his debut on August 7, 2007, against San Martín de San Juan. He was an important member of the Argentinos Juniors team that won the Clausura 2010 championship. He played in 18 of the club's 19 games during their championship winning campaign. Mercier scored the opening goal in Argentinos' 2–1 win against Huracán in the final game of the season that secured the championship. On 18 July 2011 he signed a two-year contract with the Saudi club.

On 2 July 2019 San Martín Tucumán announced, that they had signed Mercier.

=== International career ===
Mercier made his international debut for the Argentina national team on 26 January 2010 in a 3–2 win in a friendly match against Costa Rica. His second appearance was in a 2–1 win against Jamaica on 10 February 2010.

== Honours ==
Platense

- Primera B Metropolitana: 2005–06

Argentinos Juniors

- Argentine Primera División: 2010 Clausura

San Lorenzo

- Argentine Primera División: 2013 Inicial
- Copa Libertadores: 2014
- Supercopa Argentina: 2015
