= David Mendoza (footballer) =

Paraguayan footballer (born 1985)

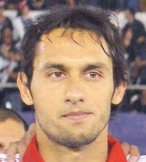
- David Mendoza

Personal information
- Full name: David Bernardo Mendoza Ayala
- Date of birth: 10 May 1985 (age 41)
- Place of birth: San Ignacio, Misiones, Paraguay
- Height: 1.80 m (5 ft 11 in)
- Position: Centre back

Team information
- Current team: Guaireña
- Number: 4

Senior career*
Years	Team	Apps	(Gls)
2007–2011	Cerro Porteño	60	(1)
2011	Rubio Ñu	20	(0)
2012–2017	Nacional	141	(2)
2017	Sportivo Trinidense	37	(2)
2018	Deportivo Lara	19	(3)
2019	General Díaz	31	(1)
2020–	Guaireña	8	(0)
- * Club domestic league appearances and goals as of 19:38, 25 May 2020 (UTC)

David Bernardo Mendoza Ayala (born 10 May 1985), known as David Mendoza, is a Paraguayan football defender who currently plays for Guaireña.
