= Néstor Ortigoza =

Paraguayan footballer (born 1984)

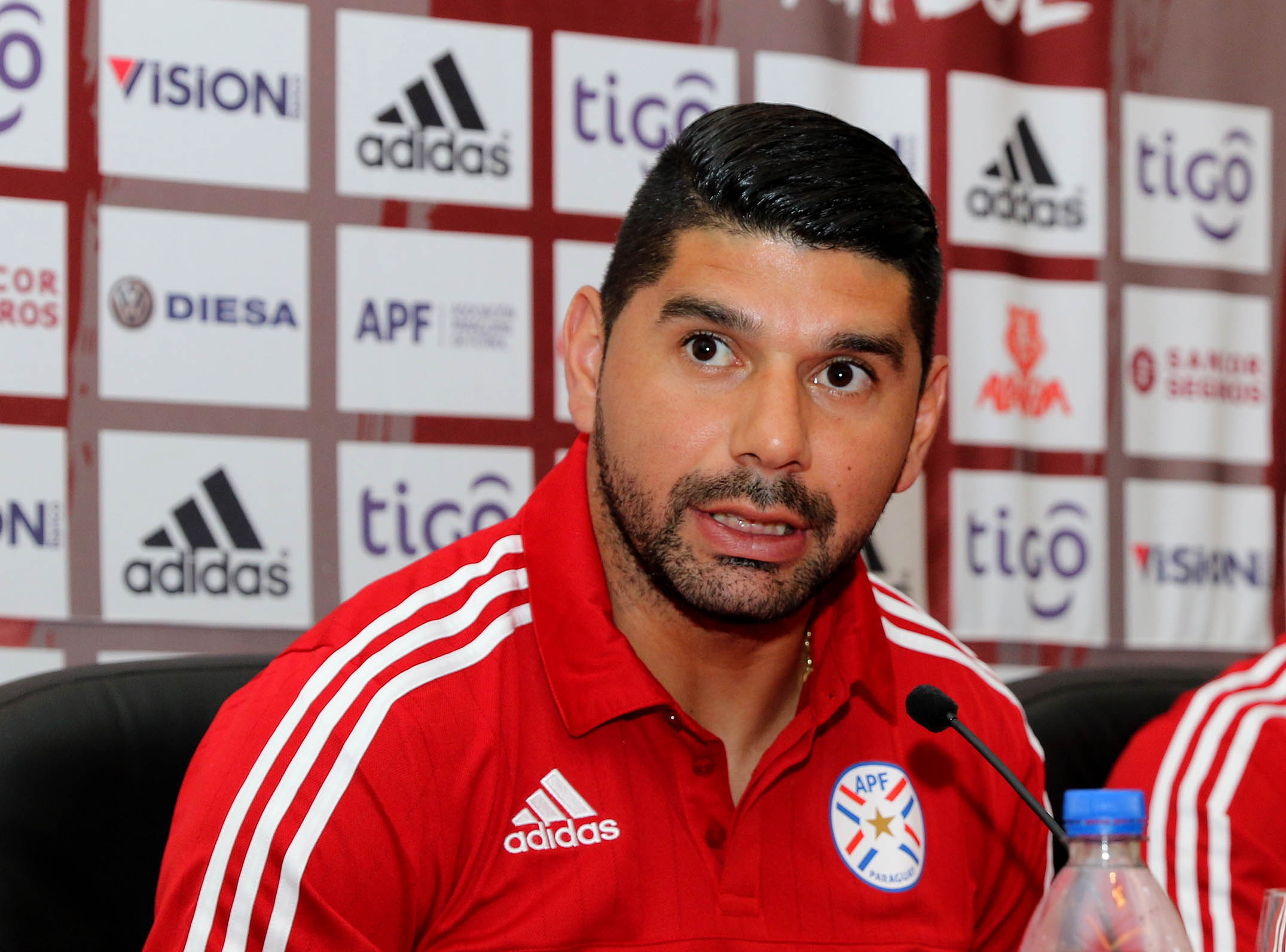
- Ortigoza with Paraguay in 2016

Personal information
- Full name: Néstor Ezequiel Ortigoza Candia
- Date of birth: 7 October 1984 (age 42)
- Place of birth: San Antonio de Padua, Argentina
- Height: 1.78 m (5 ft 10 in)
- Position: Midfielder

Youth career
- Argentinos Juniors

Senior career*
Years	Team	Apps	(Gls)
2004–2010	Argentinos Juniors	127	(17)
2005	→ Nueva Chicago (loan)	13	(0)
2010–2017	San Lorenzo	148	(15)
2012–2013	→ Emirates Club (loan)	30	(2)
2017	Olimpia	13	(1)
2018–2019	Rosario Central	26	(1)
2020–2021	Estudiantes Río Cuarto	19	(1)
2021–2022	San Lorenzo	34	(4)

International career
2009–2017	Paraguay	31	(1)
Medal record
Representing Paraguay
Copa América
Runner-up	2011 Argentina	Team
- * Club domestic league appearances and goals

Néstor Ezequiel Ortigoza Candia (Spanish pronunciation: [ˈnestoɾ oɾtiˈɣosa]; born 7 October 1984) is a former professional footballer who played as a midfielder. Born in Argentina, he played for the Paraguay national team.

== Club career ==
Ortigoza started his career in 2004 at Argentinos Juniors. In 2005, he had a brief loan spell with Nueva Chicago before returning to Argentinos. In 2007, he began to establish himself as an important member of the first team squad and in 2009 he became a near permanent fixture in the first team squad after the appointment of Claudio Borghi as the manager of Argentinos Juniors.

Ortigoza was an important member of the Argentinos Juniors team that won the Clausura 2010 championship. He played in 17 of the club's 19 games and scored 3 goals during their championship winning campaign been their captain and was selected Footballer of the Year in Argentina.

In 2011, San Lorenzo bought Ortigoza from Argentinos Juniors for $2,200,000 on a three-year contract.

In July 2012, Ortigoza signed a one-year loan contract with Emirates Club in the United Arab Emirates.

In December 2017, Ortigoza signed with Rosario Central from Olimpia.

After a half year at Estudiantes de Río Cuarto, it was rumoured that Ortigoza had moved to Bolivian club Club Atlético Ciclón in September 2020. However, Ortigoza still stayed at Estudiantes before returning to San Lorenzo in 2021.

== International career ==
Ortigoza's father is Paraguayan, meaning that the Paraguay national team's coach Gerardo Martino had the interest of Ortigoza playing for Paraguay due to Ortigoza is entitled to request Paraguayan citizenship.

On 8 April 2009, Ortigoza obtained Paraguayan nationality, which enabled him to play for the Paraguay national team. He was subsequently called up for the 2010 FIFA World Cup qualification matches against Venezuela and Colombia, as well as the main tournament. On 14 October 2014, he scored his first goal in a 2–1 away defeat to China PR in a friendly.

== Style of play ==
Néstor Ortigoza is known for stocky, physical build, and his ability to win the ball as a central midfielder. His range of distribution and his slow-paced, intelligent, precise passing game also enable him to influence games from deeper positions in midfield, where he can set the tempo of his team's play and orchestrate attacking moves. He is also a penalty kick specialist.

== Career statistics ==
Scores and results list Paraguay's goal tally first.

No	Date	Venue	Opponent	Score	Result	Competition
1	14 October 2014	Helong Stadium, Changsha, China PR	China	1–2	1–2	Friendly

== Honours ==
Argentinos Juniors

- Argentine Primera División: 2010 Clausura

Emirates Club

- UAE First Division League: 2012–13

San Lorenzo

- Argentine Primera División: 2013 Inicial
- Copa Libertadores: 2014
- Supercopa Argentina: 2015

Rosario Central

- Copa Argentina: 2018
