= Ignacio Don =

Argentine-Paraguayan footballer

Personal information
- Full name: Ignacio Óscar Don Núñez
- Date of birth: 28 February 1982 (age 44)
- Place of birth: Selva, Santiago del Estero, Argentina
- Height: 1.81 m (5 ft 11 in)
- Position: Goalkeeper

Youth career
- Atlético Selva
- Newell's Old Boys
- Rosario Central

Senior career*
Years	Team	Apps	(Gls)
	Belgrano San José	–	(–)
2005–2007	Nacional	45	(0)
2007	Huachipato	17	(0)
2008–2016	Nacional	120	(0)
2010	→ Rubio Ñu (loan)	12	(0)
2016–2018	Cerro Porteño	7	(0)
2018–2019	Guaraní	20	(0)
2020–2021	Guaireña	39	(0)
2022	Libertad	1	(0)
- * Club domestic league appearances and goals

Ignacio Óscar Don Núñez (born 28 February 1982), also known as Nacho Don, is an Argentine-Paraguayan former football goalkeeper.

== Career ==
As a youth player, Don was with Atlético Selva, Newell's Old Boys and Rosario Central before starting his career with Belgrano de San José de La Esquina in the Argentine Liga Chañarense.

In 2005, aged 22, Don moved to Paraguay and joined Nacional. After two season in that club, in 2007, he moved to Chilean Primera División team Huachipato, directed by his countrymen Antonio Zaracho during that season, because he replaced to Arturo Salah in the bench, because he was signed by Chilean powerhouse Universidad de Chile. He had a six-months spell in Chile, playing 17 league games, but Don finished as the second-choice goalkeeper Cristián Torralbo.

After an unnoticed pass at Huachipato, he returned to Nacional for the 2008 season, team in where the following season, Don played the 2009 Copa Libertadores, his first international tournament, because the club's successful season. The following season, he won the Primera División title and again won the same title in the 2011 season.

Don retired at the end of the 2022 season.

== Personal life ==
Don naturalized Paraguayan in 2014.

== Honours ==
Nacional

- Paraguayan Primera División (2): 2009, 2011
