= Derlis Orué =

Paraguayan former footballer

Personal information
- Full name: Derlis Ricardo Orué Acevedo
- Date of birth: 2 January 1989 (age 37)
- Place of birth: San Juan Nepomuceno, Paraguay
- Height: 1.72 m (5 ft 8 in)
- Position: Midfielder

Team information
- Current team: Carapeguá
- Number: 19

Senior career*
Years	Team	Apps	(Gls)
2007–2008	General Díaz	0	(0)
2009	12 de Octubre		
2010–2011	Olimpia Asunción	47	(6)
2011–2016	Nacional Asunción	175	(13)
2017	Libertad	19	(1)
2018	Nacional Asunción	23	(0)
2019	Mineros de Zacatecas	8	(0)
2019–2020	San Lorenzo	21	(0)
2021–2022	Independiente CG		
2023–2024	Sol de América	43	(1)
2025–2026	Ayacucho	34	(1)
2026	Recoleta	1	(0)
2026–	Carapeguá	8	(0)

International career
2010–	Paraguay	3	(0)
- * Club domestic league appearances and goals

Derlis Ricardo Orué Acevedo (born 2 January 1989 in San Juan Nepomuceno, Paraguay) is a Paraguayan professional footballer who plays as a midfielder for Paraguayan División Intermedia club Carapeguá.

== Honours ==
Nacional

- Paraguayan Primera División Torneo Apertura: 2011, 2013

Libertad

- Paraguayan Primera División Torneo Apertura: 2017
