= Mauro Matos =

Argentine footballer

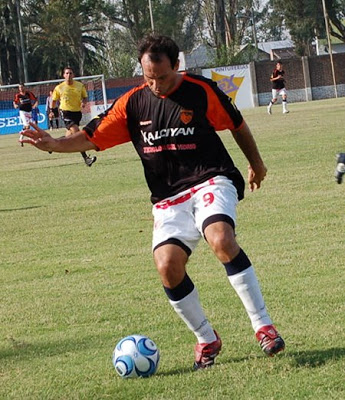
- Mauro Matos

Personal information
- Full name: Mauro Matos
- Date of birth: August 6, 1982 (age 44)
- Place of birth: Castelli, Argentina
- Height: 1.80 m (5 ft 11 in)
- Position: Forward

Youth career
- JJ Urquiza

Senior career*
Years	Team	Apps	(Gls)
2006–2007	JJ Urquiza	37	(17)
2007–2008	Deportivo Armenio	39	(22)
2008–2010	Arsenal de Sarandí	31	(4)
2010–2012	All Boys	110	(39)
2013	San Luis	12	(3)
2013	All Boys	17	(9)
2014–2017	San Lorenzo	63	(16)
2016	→ Newell's Old Boys (loan)	6	(0)
2017	→ Gimnasia La Plata (loan)	8	(1)
2017–2018	Chacarita Juniors	17	(4)
2018–2019	Atlético Tucumán	21	(4)
2019–2020	Barracas Central	15	(3)
- * Club domestic league appearances and goals

Mauro Matos (born 6 August 1982 in Castelli) is a retired Argentine football striker.

== Career ==
Matos emerged from the lower leagues of Argentine football in 2008 when he joined Arsenal de Sarandí of the Argentine Primera from Deportivo Armenio. He made his top flight debut on 16 August 2006 against Tigre and made a total of 30 Primera División appearances for the club. He also played in Club Atletico Chascomus for a short period.

In January 2010 Matos left Arsenal to join All Boys of the 2nd division.

== Honours ==
San Lorenzo

- Copa Libertadores: 2014
- Supercopa Argentina: 2015
