= Silvio Torales =

Paraguayan footballer (born 1991)

Personal information
- Full name: Silvio Gabriel Torales Castillo
- Date of birth: 23 September 1991 (age 35)
- Place of birth: Asunción, Paraguay
- Height: 1.76 m (5 ft 9 1/2 in)
- Position: Central midfielder

Team information
- Current team: River Plate Asunción
- Number: 7

Youth career
- Nacional

Senior career*
Years	Team	Apps	(Gls)
2010–2014	Nacional	179	(26)
2015	Pumas UNAM	15	(1)
2016–2018	Cerro Porteño	42	(1)
2019–	River Plate Asunción	59	(10)

International career
2011–2014	Paraguay	7	(0)
- * Club domestic league appearances and goals as of 10:08, 20 December 2020 (UTC)

Silvio Gabriel Torales Castillo (born 23 September 1991) is a Paraguayan international footballer who plays for River Plate Asunción as a central midfielder.

== Career ==
Torales began his career with Nacional in. He moved to Mexican club Pumas UNAM in January 2015.

After one year he returned to his country to play for Cerro Porteño on loan on 5 January 2016.

He made his international debut for Paraguay in 2011.
