= Julián Benítez =

Paraguayan footballer (born 1987)

Personal information
- Full name: Julián Alfonso Benítez
- Date of birth: 6 June 1987 (age 39)
- Place of birth: Pilar, Paraguay
- Height: 1.74 m (5 ft 9 in)
- Position: Forward

Youth career
- Guaraní

Senior career*
Years	Team	Apps	(Gls)
2004–2011	Guaraní	289	(77)
2011–2012	León	17	(1)
2012	Toros Neza	9	(0)
2012	Guaraní	4	(0)
2013	Nacional	19	(13)
2013	LDU Quito	20	(1)
2014	Nacional	37	(5)
2015	Guaraní	44	(11)
2016–2019	Olimpia	104	(22)
2019	→ CSA (loan)	0	(0)
2019	→ Vila Nova (loan)	6	(0)
2020	Nacional	21	(0)
2021	Resistencia		

International career
2011–2014	Paraguay	4	(0)
- * Club domestic league appearances and goals as of 19:29, 1 March 2022 (UTC)

Julián Alfonso Benítez (born 6 June 1987) is a Paraguayan international footballer who plays as a striker.

== Career ==
Benítez has played in Paraguay, Mexico and Ecuador for Guaraní, León, Toros Neza, Nacional, LDU Quito, and Olimpia.

He made his international debut for Paraguay in 2011.
