= 2014 Copa Sudamericana elimination phase =

The elimination phase of the 2014 Copa Sudamericana was played from August 19 to September 24, 2014. A total of 46 teams competed in the elimination phase.

== Draw ==
The draw of the tournament was held on May 20, 2014, 12:00 UTC−3, at the Sheraton Hotel in Buenos Aires, Argentina.

Excluding the defending champion (entering in the round of 16), the other 46 teams were divided into four zones:

- South Zone: Teams from Bolivia, Chile, Paraguay, and Uruguay (entering in the first stage)
- North Zone: Teams from Colombia, Ecuador, Peru, and Venezuela (entering in the first stage)
- Argentina Zone: Teams from Argentina (entering in the second stage)
- Brazil Zone: Teams from Brazil (entering in the second stage)

The draw mechanism was as follows:

- South Zone and North Zone:
  - For the first stage, the 16 teams from the South Zone were drawn into eight ties, and the 16 teams from the North Zone were drawn into the other eight ties. Teams which qualified for berths 1 were drawn against teams which qualified for berths 4, and teams which qualified for berths 2 were drawn against teams which qualified for berths 3, with the former hosting the second leg in both cases. Teams from the same association could not be drawn into the same tie.
  - For the second stage, the 16 winners of the first stage were drawn into eight ties. The eight winners from the South Zone were drawn against the eight winners from the North Zone, with the former hosting the second leg in four ties, and the latter hosting the second leg in the other four ties.
- Argentina Zone: The six teams were drawn into three ties. Teams which qualified for berths 1–3 were drawn against teams which qualified for berths 4–6, with the former hosting the second leg.
- Brazil Zone: The eight teams were split into four ties. No draw was held, where the matchups were based on the berths which the teams qualified for: 1 vs. 8, 2 vs. 7, 3 vs. 6, 4 vs. 5, with the former hosting the second leg.

== Seeding ==
The following was the seeding of the 46 teams entered into the first stage and second stage draw:

Teams entering in the first stage		Teams entering in the second stage	
South Zone (16 teams)	North Zone (16 teams)	Argentina Zone (6 teams)	Brazil Zone (8 teams)
1. (Bolivia) San José (Chile) Iquique (Paraguay) Cerro Porteño (Uruguay) Danubio; 2. (Bolivia) Jorge Wilstermann (Chile) Cobresal (Paraguay) Libertad (Uruguay) River Plate; 3. (Bolivia) Nacional Potosí (Chile) Universidad Católica (Paraguay) General Díaz (Uruguay) Peñarol; 4. (Bolivia) Universitario (Chile) Huachipato (Paraguay) Capiatá (Uruguay) Rentistas	1. (Colombia) Atlético Nacional (Ecuador) Emelec (Peru) Alianza Lima (Venezuela) Caracas; 2. (Colombia) Deportivo Cali (Ecuador) Independiente del Valle (Peru) Universidad César Vallejo (Venezuela) Deportivo Anzoátegui; 3. (Colombia) Millonarios (Ecuador) Universidad Católica (Peru) UTC (Venezuela) Trujillanos; 4. (Colombia) Águilas Pereira (Ecuador) Barcelona (Peru) Inti Gas (Venezuela) La Guaira	1. (Argentina) River Plate; 2. (Argentina) Boca Juniors; 3. (Argentina) Estudiantes; 4. (Argentina) Gimnasia y Esgrima; 5. (Argentina) Godoy Cruz; 6. (Argentina) Rosario Central	1. (Brazil) Vitória; 2. (Brazil) Goiás; 3. (Brazil) São Paulo; 4. (Brazil) Bahia; 5. (Brazil) Internacional; 6. (Brazil) Criciúma; 7. (Brazil) Fluminense; 8. (Brazil) Sport Recife

== Format ==
In the elimination phase, each tie was played on a home-and-away two-legged basis. If tied on aggregate, the away goals rule was used. If still tied, the penalty shoot-out was used to determine the winner (no extra time was played). The 15 winners of the second stage (three from Argentina Zone, four from Brazil Zone, eight from ties between South Zone and North Zone) advanced to the round of 16 to join the defending champion (Lanús).

== First stage ==
The first legs were played on August 19–21, and the second legs were played on August 26–28, 2014.

Team 1	Agg.	Team 2	1st leg	2nd leg
South Zone
Huachipato (Chile)	6–3	(Bolivia) San José	3–1	3–2
Universitario (Bolivia)	2–1	(Chile) Iquique	2–0	0–1
Capiatá (Paraguay)	5–3	(Uruguay) Danubio	3–1	2–2
Rentistas (Uruguay)	1–2	(Paraguay) Cerro Porteño	0–2	1–0
General Díaz (Paraguay)	4–3	(Chile) Cobresal	2–1	2–2
Nacional Potosí (Bolivia)	1–3	(Paraguay) Libertad	1–0	0–3
Universidad Católica (Chile)	0–4	(Uruguay) River Plate	0–1	0–3
Peñarol (Uruguay)	6–0	(Bolivia) Jorge Wilstermann	2–0	4–0
North Zone
Inti Gas (Peru)	0–2	(Venezuela) Caracas	0–1	0–1
Barcelona (Ecuador)	3–0	(Peru) Alianza Lima	3–0	0–0
La Guaira (Venezuela)	1–2	(Colombia) Atlético Nacional	1–1	0–1
Águilas Pereira (Colombia)	2–3	(Ecuador) Emelec	1–1	1–2
UTC (Peru)	0–3	(Colombia) Deportivo Cali	0–0	0–3
Millonarios (Colombia)	3–4	(Peru) Universidad César Vallejo	1–2	2–2
Trujillanos (Venezuela)	1–2	(Ecuador) Independiente del Valle	0–1	1–1
Universidad Católica (Ecuador)	2–2 (5–4 p)	(Venezuela) Deportivo Anzoátegui	1–1	1–1

=== Match G1 ===
August 19, 2014
21:30 UTC−4

Huachipato (Chile)	3–1	(Bolivia) San José
Vilches 1', 73'; Delgado 47'	Report	Bustamante 51' (pen.)

Estadio CAP, Talcahuano
Referee: Pablo Díaz (Argentina)

August 26, 2014
16:00 UTC−4

San José (Bolivia)	2–3	(Chile) Huachipato
Díaz 47' (pen.), 90+1'	Report	Simón 18'; Espinosa 33' (pen.); Povea 83'

Estadio Jesús Bermúdez, Oruro
Referee: Ulises Mereles (Paraguay)

Huachipato won 6–3 on aggregate.

=== Match G2 ===
August 19, 2014
17:00 UTC−4

Universitario (Bolivia)	2–0	(Chile) Iquique
Bejarano 22'; Palavicini 74'	Report

Estadio Olímpico Patria, Sucre
Referee: Mario Díaz de Vivar (Paraguay)

August 26, 2014
21:00 UTC−4

Iquique (Chile)	1–0	(Bolivia) Universitario
Mazzolatti 68'	Report

Estadio Tierra de Campeones, Iquique
Referee: Fernando Falce (Uruguay)

Universitario won 2–1 on aggregate.

=== Match G3 ===
August 21, 2014
16:15 UTC−4

Capiatá (Paraguay)	3–1	(Uruguay) Danubio
F. Escobar 16' (pen.), 50' (pen.); Irala 68'	Report	Zunino 81'

Estadio Feliciano Cáceres, Luque
Referee: Roberto Tobar (Chile)

August 28, 2014
17:00 UTC−3

Danubio (Uruguay)	2–2	(Paraguay) Capiatá
Farías 14' (pen.); Castro 78'	Report	F. Escobar 46', 62' (pen.)

Estadio Luis Franzini, Montevideo
Referee: Germán Delfino (Argentina)

Deportivo Capiatá won 5–3 on aggregate.

=== Match G4 ===
August 19, 2014
18:00 UTC−3

Rentistas (Uruguay)	0–2	(Paraguay) Cerro Porteño
	Report	Romero 27'; Dos Santos 90+1'

Estadio Luis Franzini, Montevideo
Referee: Diego Ceballos (Argentina)

August 26, 2014
21:00 UTC−4

Cerro Porteño (Paraguay)	0–1	(Uruguay) Rentistas
	Report	Alles 11'

Estadio General Pablo Rojas, Asunción
Referee: Néstor Pitana (Argentina)

Cerro Porteño won 2–1 on aggregate.

=== Match G5 ===
August 20, 2014
19:15 UTC−4

General Díaz (Paraguay)	2–1	(Chile) Cobresal
Toranzo 13'; R. Gamarra 70'	Report	Jerez 27'

Estadio Feliciano Cáceres, Luque
Referee: Andrés Cunha (Uruguay)

August 27, 2014
17:00 UTC−4

Cobresal (Chile)	2–2	(Paraguay) General Díaz
Donoso 24'; Fuentes 86'	Report	R. Gamarra 3'; Genes 33'

Estadio El Cobre, El Salvador
Referee: Gery Vargas (Bolivia)

General Díaz won 4–3 on aggregate.

=== Match G6 ===
August 20, 2014
17:00 UTC−4

Nacional Potosí (Bolivia)	1–0	(Paraguay) Libertad
Da Silva 10'	Report

Estadio Víctor Agustín Ugarte, Potosí
Referee: Roddy Zambrano (Ecuador)

August 27, 2014
19:30 UTC−4

Libertad (Paraguay)	3–0	(Bolivia) Nacional Potosí
H. López 4' (pen.), 40'; Bareiro 89'	Report

Estadio Dr. Nicolás Léoz, Asunción
Referee: Martín Vázquez (Uruguay)

Libertad won 3–1 on aggregate.

=== Match G7 ===
August 21, 2014
20:50 UTC−4

Universidad Católica (Chile)	0–1	(Uruguay) River Plate
	Report	Santos 76'

Estadio San Carlos de Apoquindo, Santiago
Referee: Enrique Cáceres (Paraguay)

August 27, 2014
20:30 UTC−3

River Plate (Uruguay)	3–0	(Chile) Universidad Católica
Santos 69'; García 87'; Techera 90+2'	Report

Estadio Luis Franzini, Montevideo
Referee: Víctor Carrillo (Peru)

River Plate won 4–0 on aggregate.

=== Match G8 ===
August 20, 2014
20:15 UTC−3

Peñarol (Uruguay)	2–0	(Bolivia) Jorge Wilstermann
Jorge Rodríguez 11'; J. J. Rodríguez 85'	Report

Estadio Centenario, Montevideo
Referee: Wilton Sampaio (Brazil)

August 28, 2014
21:00 UTC−4

Jorge Wilstermann (Bolivia)	0–4	(Uruguay) Peñarol
	Report	Diogo 23'; J. J. Rodríguez 69' (pen.); Olivera 78' (pen.); Macaluso 83'

Estadio Félix Capriles, Cochabamba
Referee: Julio Quintana (Paraguay)

Peñarol won 6–0 on aggregate.

=== Match G9 ===
August 21, 2014
13:00 UTC−5

Inti Gas (Peru)	0–1	(Venezuela) Caracas
	Report	Cure 82'

Estadio Ciudad de Cumaná, Ayacucho
Referee: Diego Lara (Ecuador)

August 28, 2014
18:00 UTC−4:30

Caracas (Venezuela)	1–0	(Peru) Inti Gas
Quijada 10'	Report

Estadio Olímpico de la UCV, Caracas
Referee: Luis Sánchez (Colombia)

Caracas won 2–0 on aggregate.

=== Match G10 ===
August 21, 2014
17:30 UTC−5

Barcelona (Ecuador)	3–0	(Peru) Alianza Lima
Penilla 31'; Velasco 66'; Blanco 90+1'	Report

Estadio Monumental Isidro Romero Carbo, Guayaquil
Referee: Adrián Vélez (Colombia)

August 27, 2014
21:00 UTC−5

Alianza Lima (Peru)	0–0	(Ecuador) Barcelona
	Report

Estadio Alejandro Villanueva, Lima
Referee: Imer Machado (Colombia)

Barcelona won 3–0 on aggregate.

=== Match G11 ===
August 20, 2014
21:00 UTC−4:30

La Guaira (Venezuela)	1–1	(Colombia) Atlético Nacional
Villegas 65'	Report	Cardona 82' (pen.)

Estadio Olímpico de la UCV, Caracas
Referee: Diego Haro (Peru)

August 27, 2014
21:00 UTC−5

Atlético Nacional (Colombia)	1–0	(Venezuela) La Guaira
L. Ruiz 53'	Report

Estadio Atanasio Girardot, Medellín
Referee: Omar Ponce (Ecuador)

Atlético Nacional won 2–1 on aggregate.

=== Match G12 ===
August 19, 2014
18:15 UTC−5

Águilas Pereira (Colombia)	1–1	(Ecuador) Emelec
D. Álvarez 90+1'	Report	Mena 40'

Estadio Hernán Ramírez Villegas, Pereira
Referee: Péricles Cortez (Brazil)

August 26, 2014
17:30 UTC−5

Emelec (Ecuador)	2–1	(Colombia) Águilas Pereira
Giménez 3', 90+3'	Report	Fano 59'

Estadio George Capwell, Guayaquil
Referee: Mauro Vigliano (Argentina)

Emelec won 3–2 on aggregate.

=== Match G13 ===
August 20, 2014
16:00 UTC−5

UTC (Peru)	0–0	(Colombia) Deportivo Cali
	Report

Estadio Héroes de San Ramón, Cajamarca
Referee: Julio Bascuñán (Chile)

August 28, 2014
20:00 UTC−5

Deportivo Cali (Colombia)	3–0	(Peru) UTC
Nasuti 4', 68'; Rivas 24'	Report

Estadio Olímpico Pascual Guerrero, Cali
Referee: Jesús Valenzuela (Venezuela)

Deportivo Cali won 3–0 on aggregate.

=== Match G14 ===
August 21, 2014
19:50 UTC−5

Millonarios (Colombia)	1–2	(Peru) Universidad César Vallejo
Uribe 44'	Report	Pando 2', 39'

Estadio El Campín, Bogotá
Referee: José Argote (Venezuela)

August 28, 2014
17:30 UTC−5

Universidad César Vallejo (Peru)	2–2	(Colombia) Millonarios
Quinteros 2', 18'	Report	Uribe 34'; Agudelo 66'

Estadio Mansiche, Trujillo
Referee: Carlos Ulloa (Chile)

Universidad César Vallejo won 4–3 on aggregate.

=== Match G15 ===
August 21, 2014
18:00 UTC−4:30

Trujillanos (Venezuela)	0–1	(Ecuador) Independiente del Valle
	Report	D. Angulo 78'

Estadio José Alberto Pérez, Valera
Referee: Wilson Lamouroux (Colombia)

August 27, 2014
16:00 UTC−5

Independiente del Valle (Ecuador)	1–1	(Venezuela) Trujillanos
Solís 90'	Report	S. Álvarez 90+1'

Estadio Rumiñahui, Sangolquí
Referee: Henry Gambetta (Peru)

Independiente del Valle won 2–1 on aggregate.

=== Match G16 ===
August 19, 2014
18:15 UTC−5

Universidad Católica (Ecuador)	1–1	(Venezuela) Deportivo Anzoátegui
H. Patta 35'	Report	Arteaga 54'

Estadio Olímpico Atahualpa, Quito
Referee: Alejandro Mancilla (Bolivia)

August 26, 2014
18:00 UTC−4:30

Deportivo Anzoátegui (Venezuela)	1–1	(Ecuador) Universidad Católica
R. Escobar 33'	Report	Wila 86' (pen.)
Penalties
E. Hernández (penalty missed); Aguilar (penalty scored); R. Hernández (penalty missed); Ricardo Martins (penalty scored); Arteaga (penalty scored); Fuenmayor (penalty scored); Moreno (penalty missed)	4–5	(penalty missed) F. Martínez; (penalty scored) H. Patta; (penalty scored) Carabalí; (penalty scored) Benítez; (penalty missed) Wila; (penalty scored) Godoy; (penalty scored) Uglessich

Estadio José Antonio Anzoátegui, Puerto la Cruz
Referee: Miguel Santiváñez (Peru)

Tied 2–2 on aggregate, Universidad Católica won on penalties.

== Second stage ==
The first legs were played on August 27–28, September 3–4, 10–11, and 16–18, and the second legs were played on September 3–4, 16–18, and 23–25, 2014.

Team 1	Agg.	Team 2	1st leg	2nd leg
Sport Recife (Brazil)	1–3	(Brazil) Vitória	0–1	1–2
Capiatá (Paraguay)	4–2	(Venezuela) Caracas	1–1	3–1
Godoy Cruz (Argentina)	0–3	(Argentina) River Plate	0–1	0–2
Huachipato (Chile)	2–1	(Ecuador) Universidad Católica	2–0	0–1
Fluminense (Brazil)	2–2 (a)	(Brazil) Goiás	2–1	0–1
Peñarol (Uruguay)	3–2	(Colombia) Deportivo Cali	2–2	1–0
Universitario (Bolivia)	2–5	(Peru) Universidad César Vallejo	2–2	0–3
Internacional (Brazil)	1–3	(Brazil) Bahia	0–2	1–1
Independiente del Valle (Ecuador)	1–3	(Paraguay) Cerro Porteño	1–0	0–3
Gimnasia y Esgrima (Argentina)	0–1	(Argentina) Estudiantes	0–0	0–1
Emelec (Ecuador)	3–2	(Uruguay) River Plate	2–1	1–1
Criciúma (Brazil)	2–3	(Brazil) São Paulo	2–1	0–2
Barcelona (Ecuador)	1–2	(Paraguay) Libertad	1–0	0–2
Rosario Central (Argentina)	1–4	(Argentina) Boca Juniors	1–1	0–3
Atlético Nacional (Colombia)	3–3 (a)	(Paraguay) General Díaz	0–2	3–1

=== Match O1 ===
August 28, 2014
22:00 UTC−3

Sport Recife (Brazil)	0–1	(Brazil) Vitória
	Report	Beltrán 9'

Estádio Ilha do Retiro, Recife
Attendance: 8,320
Referee: Oscar Maldonado (Bolivia)

September 3, 2014
22:00 UTC−3

Vitória (Brazil)	2–1	(Brazil) Sport Recife
Willie 21'; Marcinho 73'	Report	Rithely 50'

Estádio Manoel Barradas, Salvador
Attendance: 2,592
Referee: Leandro Vuaden (Brazil)

Vitória won 3–1 on aggregate.

=== Match O2 ===
September 16, 2014
20:15 UTC−4

Capiatá (Paraguay)	1–1	(Venezuela) Caracas
C. López 41'	Report	Otero 89'

Estadio Deportivo Capiatá, Capiatá
Referee: José Jordán (Bolivia)

September 24, 2014
17:30 UTC−4:30

Caracas (Venezuela)	1–3	(Paraguay) Capiatá
Flores 49'	Report	Ruiz Peralta 27', 47'; Ó. Ruiz 68'

Estadio Olímpico de la UCV, Caracas
Referee: Víctor Carrillo (Peru)

Deportivo Capiatá won 4–2 on aggregate.

=== Match O3 ===
September 3, 2014
21:15 UTC−3

Godoy Cruz (Argentina)	0–1	(Argentina) River Plate
	Report	Pezzella 90+1'

Estadio Malvinas Argentinas, Mendoza
Attendance: 28,451
Referee: Silvio Trucco (Argentina)

September 17, 2014
21:15 UTC−3

River Plate (Argentina)	2–0	(Argentina) Godoy Cruz
Mora 27', 31'	Report

Estadio Antonio Vespucio Liberti, Buenos Aires
Attendance: 36,807
Referee: Saúl Laverni (Argentina)

River Plate won 3–0 on aggregate.

=== Match O4 ===
September 17, 2014
18:00 UTC−3

Huachipato (Chile)	2–0	(Ecuador) Universidad Católica
Vilches 12', 48'	Report

Estadio CAP, Talcahuano
Referee: Andrés Cunha (Uruguay)

September 24, 2014
17:00 UTC−5

Universidad Católica (Ecuador)	1–0	(Chile) Huachipato
F. Martínez 33' (pen.)	Report

Estadio Olímpico Atahualpa, Quito
Referee: José Argote (Venezuela)

Huachipato won 2–1 on aggregate.

=== Match O5 ===
August 28, 2014
18:00 UTC−3

Fluminense (Brazil)	2–1	(Brazil) Goiás
Edson 28', 33'	Report	Erik 90+3'

Estádio do Maracanã, Rio de Janeiro
Attendance: 6,314
Referee: Enrique Cáceres (Paraguay)

September 3, 2014
22:00 UTC−3

Goiás (Brazil)	1–0	(Brazil) Fluminense
Erik 47'	Report

Estádio Serra Dourada, Goiânia
Attendance: 11,024
Referee: Francisco Nascimento (Brazil)

Tied 2–2 on aggregate, Goiás won on away goals.

=== Match O6 ===
September 16, 2014
21:30 UTC−3

Peñarol (Uruguay)	2–2	(Colombia) Deportivo Cali
Núñez 47'; Zalayeta 57'	Report	S. Herrera 53'; Rivas 68'

Estadio Centenario, Montevideo
Referee: Roddy Zambrano (Ecuador)

September 24, 2014
19:15 UTC−5

Deportivo Cali (Colombia)	0–1	(Uruguay) Peñarol
	Report	Zalayeta 10'

Estadio Olímpico Pascual Guerrero, Cali
Referee: Antonio Arias (Paraguay)

Peñarol won 3–2 on aggregate.

=== Match O8 ===
September 17, 2014
18:00 UTC−4

Universitario (Bolivia)	2–2	(Peru) Universidad César Vallejo
Ballivián 71'; Camacho 90+4'	Report	Pando 50'; D. Chávez 56'

Estadio Olímpico Patria, Sucre
Attendance: 16,000
Referee: Péricles Cortez (Brazil)

September 23, 2014
17:00 UTC−5

Universidad César Vallejo (Peru)	3–0	(Bolivia) Universitario
Millán 54'; Pando 61'; D. Chávez 82'	Report

Estadio Mansiche, Trujillo
Referee: Adrián Vélez (Colombia)

Universidad César Vallejo won 5–2 on aggregate.

=== Match O9 ===
August 27, 2014
22:00 UTC−3

Internacional (Brazil)	0–2	(Brazil) Bahia
	Report	Lucas Fonseca 42'; Diego Macedo 46'

Estádio Beira-Rio, Porto Alegre
Attendance: 9,368
Referee: Christian Ferreyra (Uruguay)

September 4, 2014
22:00 UTC−3

Bahia (Brazil)	1–1	(Brazil) Internacional
Henrique 78'	Report	Diego Macedo 45' (o.g.)

Itaipava Arena Fonte Nova, Salvador
Attendance: 3,969
Referee: Marcelo Henrique (Brazil)

Bahia won 3–1 on aggregate.

=== Match O10 ===
September 16, 2014
17:00 UTC−5

Independiente del Valle (Ecuador)	1–0	(Paraguay) Cerro Porteño
Mina 55'	Report

Estadio Rumiñahui, Sangolquí
Referee: Hernando Buitrago (Colombia)

September 23, 2014
20:15 UTC−4

Cerro Porteño (Paraguay)	3–0	(Ecuador) Independiente del Valle
Ortigoza 34'; Mareco 55'; Güiza 65'	Report

Estadio Defensores del Chaco, Asunción
Referee: Daniel Fedorczuk (Uruguay)

Cerro Porteño won 3–1 on aggregate.

=== Match O11 ===
September 3, 2014
14:00 UTC−3

Gimnasia y Esgrima (Argentina)	0–0	(Argentina) Estudiantes
	Report

Estadio Juan Carmelo Zerillo, La Plata
Attendance: 19,786
Referee: Diego Abal (Argentina)

September 16, 2014
19:00 UTC−3

Estudiantes (Argentina)	1–0	(Argentina) Gimnasia y Esgrima
Vera 49'	Report

Estadio Ciudad de La Plata, La Plata
Attendance: 32,666
Referee: Néstor Pitana (Argentina)

Estudiantes won 1–0 on aggregate.

=== Match O12 ===
September 18, 2014
19:15 UTC−5

Emelec (Ecuador)	2–1	(Uruguay) River Plate
Mondaini 26'; Bolaños 47'	Report	Santos 73' (pen.)

Estadio George Capwell, Guayaquil
Referee: Julio Bascuñán (Chile)

September 25, 2014
21:15 UTC−3

River Plate (Uruguay)	1–1	(Ecuador) Emelec
L. Rodríguez 34'	Report	Mena 26'

Estadio Luis Franzini, Montevideo
Referee: Diego Ceballos (Argentina)

Emelec won 3–2 on aggregate.

=== Match O13 ===
August 28, 2014
20:00 UTC−3

Criciúma (Brazil)	2–1	(Brazil) São Paulo
Silvinho 15'; Lucca 42'	Report	Pato 26'

Estádio Heriberto Hülse, Criciúma
Attendance: 7,271
Referee: Julio Bascuñán (Chile)

September 4, 2014
20:00 UTC−3

São Paulo (Brazil)	2–0	(Brazil) Criciúma
Edson Silva 32'; Kaká 40'	Report

Estádio Cícero Pompeu de Toledo, São Paulo
Attendance: 10,140
Referee: Ricardo Marques (Brazil)

São Paulo won 3–2 on aggregate.

=== Match O14 ===
September 11, 2014
19:15 UTC−5

Barcelona (Ecuador)	1–0	(Paraguay) Libertad
Blanco 14'	Report

Estadio Monumental Isidro Romero Carbo, Guayaquil
Referee: Patricio Loustau (Argentina)

September 17, 2014
20:15 UTC−4

Libertad (Paraguay)	2–0	(Ecuador) Barcelona
H. López 7'; J. González 43'	Report

Estadio Dr. Nicolás Léoz, Asunción
Referee: Marcelo Henrique (Brazil)

Libertad won 2–1 on aggregate.

=== Match O15 ===
September 4, 2014
21:15 UTC−3

Rosario Central (Argentina)	1–1	(Argentina) Boca Juniors
Becker 90+5'	Report	Marín 36'

Estadio Gigante de Arroyito, Rosario
Attendance: 25,073
Referee: Mauro Vigliano (Argentina)

September 18, 2014
21:15 UTC−3

Boca Juniors (Argentina)	3–0	(Argentina) Rosario Central
A. Chávez 20', 70'; Fuenzalida 83'	Report

Estadio Alberto J. Armando, Buenos Aires
Attendance: 37,689
Referee: Diego Abal (Argentina)

Boca Juniors won 4–1 on aggregate.

=== Match O16 ===
September 10, 2014
19:15 UTC−5

Atlético Nacional (Colombia)	0–2	(Paraguay) General Díaz
	Report	P. Chávez 16'; Cáceres 25'

Estadio Atanasio Girardot, Medellín
Referee: Juan Soto (Venezuela)

September 25, 2014
20:30 UTC−4

General Díaz (Paraguay)	1–3	(Colombia) Atlético Nacional
R. Gamarra 58'	Report	Cardona 12'; Guisao 61'; Tréllez 87'

Estadio Feliciano Cáceres, Luque
Referee: Julio Bascuñán (Chile)

Tied 3–3 on aggregate, Atlético Nacional won on away goals.
