= 2014 Club Atlético River Plate season =

Club Atlético River Plate
2014 season
- President: Rodolfo D'Onofrio
- Manager: Marcelo Gallardo
- Stadium: Estadio Monumental Antonio Vespucio Liberti
- Primera División: 2nd
- Copa Sudamericana: Winners
- Biggest win: River 4–0 Godoy Cruz
- Biggest defeat: 1-0 vs Estudientes and Racing Club
Home colours	Away colours	Third colours

The 2014 season is Club Atlético River Plate's 3rd consecutive season in the top-flight of Argentine football. The season began on August 8, 2014 and ended on December 14, 2014.

== Season events ==
The season was six months long due to a decision from AFA to change the July–June calendar to January–December.

On May 27, Ramón Díaz resigned after leading the team to win the 2014 Torneo Final and 2014 Superfinal.

On June 7, Marcelo Gallardo signed as new coach of the team.

On December 10, River Plate secured its first international title in 17 years, the 2014 Copa Sudamericana.

== Squad ==
Note: Flags indicate national team as defined under FIFA eligibility rules; some limited exceptions apply. Players may hold more than one non-FIFA nationality.

No.	Pos.	Nation	Player
1	GK	ARG	Marcelo Barovero (Vice-Captain)
2	DF	ARG	Jonatan Maidana
3	DF	COL	Eder Alvarez Balanta
5	MF	ARG	Matías Kranevitter
6	DF	ARG	Ramiro Funes Mori
7	FW	URU	Rodrigo Mora
8	MF	URU	Carlos Sanchez
9	FW	ARG	Fernando Cavenaghi (Captain)
11	MF	ARG	Osmar Ferreira
13	DF	ARG	Bruno Urribarri
14	DF	ARG	Augusto Solari
15	MF	ARG	Leonardo Pisculichi
16	MF	ARG	Ariel Rojas
17	MF	ARG	Martin Aguirre
18	FW	ARG	Giovanni Simeone

No.	Pos.	Nation	Player
19	FW	COL	Teofilo Gutierrez
20	DF	ARG	Germán Pezzella
21	DF	ARG	Leonel Vangioni
23	MF	ARG	Leonardo Ponzio (3rd Captain)
24	DF	ARG	Emanuel Mammana
25	DF	ARG	Gabriel Mercado
28	MF	ARG	Guido Rodríguez
29	MF	ARG	Ezequiel Cirigliano
30	MF	ARG	Tomas Martinez
31	FW	ARG	Lucas Boye
32	FW	ARG	Sebastián Driussi
33	GK	ARG	Julio Chiarini
34	FW	ARG	Juan Cruz Kaprof
42	GK	ARG	Augusto Batalla

== Transfers ==
=== In ===
Number	Pos.	Name	From
7	FW	(Uruguay) Rodrigo Mora	Club Universidad de Chile
8	MF	(Uruguay) Carlos Sanchez	(Mexico) Club de Fútbol Pachuca
15	MF	(Argentina) Leonardo Pisculichi	(Argentina) Argentinos Juniors
29	MF	(Argentina) Ezequiel Cirigliano	(Italy) Hellas Verona
33	GK	(Argentina) Julio Chiarini	(Argentina) Instituto Atlético Central Córdoba

=== Out ===
Number	Pos.	Name	To
7	MF	(Colombia) Carlos Carbonero	(Italy) Udinese Calcio
8	MF	(Argentina) Juan Carlos Menseguez	(Argentina) Atletico Rafaela
10	MF	(Argentina) Manuel Lanzini	(United Arab Emirates) Al Jazira FC
17	MF	(Paraguay) Jonathan Fabbro	(Paraguay) Cerro Porteño
19	GK	(Argentina) Leandro Chichizola	(Italy) Spezia Calcio
28	MF	(Argentina) Cristian Ledesma	(Argentina) Argentinos Juniors
30	FW	(Argentina) Daniel Villalva	(Mexico) Club Tijuana
	FW	(France) David Trezeguet	(India) Pune City

== Primera División ==
=== League table ===
Pos	Team	Pld	W	D	L	GF	GA	GD	Pts	Qualification
1	Racing	19	13	2	4	30	16	+14	41	2015 Copa Libertadores second stage
2	River Plate	19	11	6	2	34	13	+21	39	2015 Copa Libertadores second stage and 2015 Copa Sudamericana Round of 16 (Note: Qualified as 2014 Torneo Final champion and 2014 Copa Sudamericana champion)
3	Lanús	19	10	5	4	28	23	+5	35	2015 Copa Sudamericana second stage
4	Independiente	19	10	3	6	31	29	+2	33	2015 Copa Sudamericana second stage
5	Boca Juniors	19	9	4	6	25	23	+2	31	2015 Copa Libertadores second stage

Source: Programación de Primera División Torneo Final 2013/2014

== Copa Sudamericana ==
Win Draw Loss

3 September 2014 Second Stage	Godoy Cruz (Argentina)	0 - 1	(Argentina) River Plate	Mendoza, Argentina
21.15 (UTC−03:00)	Ramírez (yellow card) 36'; Velázquez (yellow card) 38'; Silva (yellow card) 79'; Rodríguez (yellow card) 80'; Fernández (yellow card) 86'	Summary	Funes Mori (yellow card) 79'; Pezzella 90+2'	Stadium: Malvinas Argentinas; Referee: Silvio Trucco

17 September 2014 Second Stage	River Plate (Argentina)	2 - 0 (agg: 3-0)	(Argentina) Godoy Cruz	Buenos Aires, Argentina
21.15 (UTC−03:00)	Mora 28' 32'; Vangioni (yellow card) 68'; Funes Mori (yellow card) 90'	Summary	Ramírez (yellow card) 73'; Zuqui (yellow card) 75'; Rodríguez (yellow card) 84'	Stadium: El Monumental; Referee: S.Laverni

16 October 2014 Round of 16	Libertad (Paraguay)	1 – 3	(Argentina) River Plate	Asunción, Paraguay
21:30 UTC−3	Vargas 45+1'	Report	Sánchez 60'; Driussi 71'; Simeone 75'	Stadium: Nicolás Léoz; Referee: Víctor Carrillo (Peru)

22 October 2014 Round of 16	River Plate (Argentina)	2 – 0 (agg: 5-1)	(Paraguay) Libertad	Buenos Aires, Argentina
21:30 UTC−3	Mercado 41'; Simeone 90+1'	Report		Stadium: El Monumental; Referee: Hernando Buitrago (Colombia)

29 October 2014 Quarterfinals	Estudiantes (Argentina)	1–2	(Argentina) River Plate	La Plata, Argentina
20:15 UTC−3	Vera 45+1'	Report	Mora 52'; Sánchez 71'	Stadium: Ciudad de La Plata, La Plata; Referee: Diego Abal (Argentina)

6 November 2014 Quarterfinals	River Plate (Argentina)	3 – 2 (agg: 5-3)	(Argentina) Estudiantes	Buenos Aires, Argentina
21:30 UTC−3	Gutiérrez 1'; Mora 60'; Funes Mori 62'	Report	Vera 41'; Carrillo 50' (pen.)	Stadium: El Monumental; Referee: Néstor Pitana (Argentina)

20 November 2014 Semifinals	Boca Juniors (Argentina)	0 – 0	(Argentina) River Plate	Buenos Aires, Argentina
20:45 UTC−3		Report		Stadium: La Bombonera; Attendance: 50.000; Referee: Silvio Trucco (Argentina)

27 November 2014 Semifinals	River Plate (Argentina)	1 – 0 (agg: 1-0)	(Argentina) Boca Juniors	Buenos Aires, Argentina
20:45 UTC−3	Pisculichi 16'	Report		Stadium: El Monumental; Attendance: 65.250; Referee: Germán Delfino (Argentina)

3 December 2014 Final	Atlético Nacional (Colombia)	1 – 1	(Argentina) River Plate	Medellín, Colombia
19:15 UTC−5	Berrío 34'	Report	Pisculichi 65'	Stadium: Atanasio Girardot; Attendance: 44,412; Referee: Ricardo Marques (Brazil)

10 December 2014 Final	River Plate (Argentina)	2 – 0 (agg: 3-1)	(Colombia) Atlético Nacional	Buenos Aires, Argentina
21:15 UTC−3	Mercado 54'; Pezzella 58'	Report		Stadium: El Monumental; Referee: Darío Ubriaco (Uruguay)

== Squad statistics ==
=== Appearances and goals ===
Players included in matchday squads
No	Pos.	Nat.	Name	League		Copa Sudamericana		Total		Discipline	
No	Pos.	Nat.	Name	Apps	Goals	Apps	Goals	Apps	Goals	A yellow rectangle, denoting the yellow penalty card shown to a player being cautioned	A red rectangle, denoting the red penalty card shown to a player being sent off
1	GK	ARG	Marcelo Barovero	0	0	0	0	0	0	0	0
2	DF	ARG	Jonatan Maidana	0	0	0	0	0	0	0	0
7	FW	URU	Rodrigo Mora	0	0	0	0	0	0	0	0
15	MF	ARG	Leonardo Pisculichi	0	0	0	0	0	0	0	0
16	MF	ARG	Ariel Rojas	0	0	0	0	0	0	0	0
