= 2014 Copa Sudamericana final stages =

The final stages of the 2014 Copa Sudamericana were played from October 1 to December 10, 2014. A total of 16 teams competed in the final stages.

== Draw ==
The draw of the tournament was held on May 20, 2014, 12:00 UTC−3, at the Sheraton Hotel in Buenos Aires, Argentina.

To determine the bracket starting from the round of 16, the defending champion and the 15 winners of the second stage were assigned a "seed" by draw. The defending champion and the winners from Argentina Zone and Brazil Zone were assigned odd-numbered "seeds", and the winners from ties between South Zone and North Zone were assigned even-numbered "seeds".

== Seeding ==
The following were the seeding of the 16 teams which qualified for the final stages, which included the defending champion (Lanús) and the 15 winners of the second stage (three from Argentina Zone, four from Brazil Zone, eight from ties between South Zone and North Zone):

Seed	Team
1	(Brazil) Vitória
2	(Paraguay) Capiatá
3	(Argentina) River Plate
4	(Chile) Huachipato
5	(Brazil) Goiás
6	(Uruguay) Peñarol
7	(Argentina) Lanús
8	(Peru) Universidad César Vallejo
9	(Brazil) Bahia
10	(Paraguay) Cerro Porteño
11	(Argentina) Estudiantes
12	(Ecuador) Emelec
13	(Brazil) São Paulo
14	(Paraguay) Libertad
15	(Argentina) Boca Juniors
16	(Colombia) Atlético Nacional

== Format ==
In the final stages, the 16 teams played a single-elimination tournament, with the following rules:

- Each tie was played on a home-and-away two-legged basis, with the higher-seeded team hosting the second leg.
- In the round of 16, quarterfinals, and semifinals, if tied on aggregate, the away goals rule was used. If still tied, a penalty shoot-out was used to determine the winner (no extra time was played).
- In the finals, if tied on aggregate, the away goals rule was not used, and 30 minutes of extra time were played. If still tied after extra time, a penalty shoot-out was used to determine the winner.
- If there were two semifinalists from the same association, they had to play each other.

== Bracket ==
The bracket of the knockout stages was determined by the seeding as follows:

- Round of 16:
  - Match A: Seed 1 vs. Seed 16
  - Match B: Seed 2 vs. Seed 15
  - Match C: Seed 3 vs. Seed 14
  - Match D: Seed 4 vs. Seed 13
  - Match E: Seed 5 vs. Seed 12
  - Match F: Seed 6 vs. Seed 11
  - Match G: Seed 7 vs. Seed 10
  - Match H: Seed 8 vs. Seed 9
- Quarterfinals:
  - Match S1: Winner A vs. Winner H
  - Match S2: Winner B vs. Winner G
  - Match S3: Winner C vs. Winner F
  - Match S4: Winner D vs. Winner E
- Semifinals: (if there were two semifinalists from the same association, they must play each other)
  - Match F1: Winner S1 vs. Winner S4
  - Match F2: Winner S2 vs. Winner S3
- Finals: Winner F1 vs. Winner F2

Round of 16
16	(Colombia) Atlético Nacional	2	1	3
1	(Brazil) Vitória	2	0	2
9	(Brazil) Bahia	2	0	2 (6)
8	(Peru) Univ. César Vallejo (p)	0	2	2 (7)
13	(Brazil) São Paulo	1	3	4
4	(Chile) Huachipato	0	2	2
12	(Ecuador) Emelec (p)	1	0	1 (6)
5	(Brazil) Goiás	0	1	1 (5)
15	(Argentina) Boca Juniors (p)	0	1	1 (4)
2	(Paraguay) Capiatá	1	0	1 (3)
10	(Paraguay) Cerro Porteño	2	1	3
7	(Argentina) Lanús	1	1	2
11	(Argentina) Estudiantes (p)	2	1	3 (3)
6	(Uruguay) Peñarol	1	2	3 (1)
14	(Paraguay) Libertad	1	0	1
3	(Argentina) River Plate	3	2	5

Quarterfinals
16	(Colombia) Atlético Nacional	1	1	2
8	(Peru) Univ. César Vallejo	0	0	0
13	(Brazil) São Paulo	4	2	6
12	(Ecuador) Emelec	2	3	5
15	(Argentina) Boca Juniors	1	4	5
10	(Paraguay) Cerro Porteño	0	1	1
11	(Argentina) Estudiantes	1	2	3
3	(Argentina) River Plate	2	3	5

Semifinals
16	(Colombia) Atlético Nacional (p)	1	0	1 (4)
13	(Brazil) São Paulo	0	1	1 (1)
15	(Argentina) Boca Juniors	0	0	0
3	(Argentina) River Plate	0	1	1

Finals
16	(Colombia) Atlético Nacional	1	0	1
3	(Argentina) River Plate	1	2	3

== Round of 16 ==
The first legs were played on September 30, October 1 and 14–16, and the second legs were played on October 15–16 and 21–23, 2014.

Team 1	Agg.	Team 2	1st leg	2nd leg
Atlético Nacional (Colombia)	3–2	(Brazil) Vitória	2–2	1–0
Boca Juniors (Argentina)	1–1 (4–3 p)	(Paraguay) Capiatá	0–1	1–0
Libertad (Paraguay)	1–5	(Argentina) River Plate	1–3	0–2
São Paulo (Brazil)	4–2	(Chile) Huachipato	1–0	3–2
Emelec (Ecuador)	1–1 (6–5 p)	(Brazil) Goiás	1–0	0–1
Estudiantes (Argentina)	3–3 (3–1 p)	(Uruguay) Peñarol	2–1	1–2
Cerro Porteño (Paraguay)	3–2	(Argentina) Lanús	2–1	1–1
Bahia (Brazil)	2–2 (6–7 p)	(Peru) Universidad César Vallejo	2–0	0–2

=== Match A ===
October 1, 2014
20:00 UTC−5

Atlético Nacional (Colombia)	2–2	(Brazil) Vitória
Bocanegra 3'; L. Ruiz 65' (pen.)	Report	Ednei 45'; William Henrique 48'

Estadio Atanasio Girardot, Medellín
Referee: Carlos Vera (Ecuador)

October 16, 2014
19:15 UTC−3

Vitória (Brazil)	0–1	(Colombia) Atlético Nacional
	Report	Bocanegra 70'

Estádio Manoel Barradas, Salvador
Referee: Diego Abal (Argentina)

Atlético Nacional won 3–2 on aggregate.

=== Match B ===
October 15, 2014
21:15 UTC−3

Boca Juniors (Argentina)	0–1	(Paraguay) Capiatá
	Report	Ó. Ruiz 43'

Estadio Alberto J. Armando, Buenos Aires
Referee: Sandro Ricci (Brazil)

October 23, 2014
21:15 UTC−3

Capiatá (Paraguay)	0–1	(Argentina) Boca Juniors
	Report	Calleri 73'
Penalties
F. Escobar (penalty scored); N. González (penalty scored); Irala (penalty missed); Irrazábal (penalty missed); Á. Martínez (penalty scored); Aquino (penalty missed)	3–4	(penalty scored) Gigliotti; (penalty missed) Pérez; (penalty scored) Gago; (penalty missed) Colazo; (penalty scored) A. Chávez; (penalty scored) Orión

Estadio Feliciano Cáceres, Luque
Referee: Wilmar Roldán (Colombia)

Tied 1–1 on aggregate, Boca Juniors won on penalties.

=== Match C ===
October 16, 2014
21:30 UTC−3

Libertad (Paraguay)	1–3	(Argentina) River Plate
Vargas 45+1'	Report	Sánchez 60'; Driussi 71'; Simeone 75'

Estadio Dr. Nicolás Léoz, Asunción
Referee: Víctor Carrillo (Peru)

October 22, 2014
21:30 UTC−3

River Plate (Argentina)	2–0	(Paraguay) Libertad
Mercado 41'; Simeone 90+1'	Report

Estadio Antonio Vespucio Liberti, Buenos Aires
Referee: Hernando Buitrago (Colombia)

River Plate won 5–1 on aggregate.

=== Match D ===
September 30, 2014
20:30 UTC−3

São Paulo (Brazil)	1–0	(Chile) Huachipato
Michel Bastos 55'	Report

Estádio Cícero Pompeu de Toledo, São Paulo
Referee: Christian Ferreyra (Uruguay)

October 15, 2014
19:30 UTC−3

Huachipato (Chile)	2–3	(Brazil) São Paulo
Vilches 20'; Sagal 87'	Report	Michel Bastos 9'; Ganso 22'; Boschilia 89'

Estadio CAP, Talcahuano
Referee: Antonio Arias (Paraguay)

São Paulo won 4–2 on aggregate.

=== Match E ===
October 1, 2014
20:00 UTC−5

Emelec (Ecuador)	1–0	(Brazil) Goiás
E. Herrera 86'	Report

Estadio George Capwell, Guayaquil
Referee: Oscar Maldonado (Bolivia)

October 15, 2014
22:00 UTC−3

Goiás (Brazil)	1–0	(Ecuador) Emelec
Erik 19'	Report
Penalties
Thiago Mendes (penalty scored); Lima (penalty scored); Bruno Mineiro (penalty missed); Jackson (penalty scored); Erik (penalty scored); Esquerdinha (penalty scored); Pedro Henrique (penalty missed)	5–6	(penalty scored) Bolaños; (penalty missed) Mena; (penalty scored) Mondaini; (penalty scored) Bagüí; (penalty scored) Quiñónez; (penalty scored) Gaibor; (penalty scored) Giménez

Estádio Serra Dourada, Goiânia
Attendance: 25,741
Referee: Wilmar Roldán (Colombia)

Tied 1–1 on aggregate, Emelec won on penalties.

=== Match F ===
October 14, 2014
19:15 UTC−3

Estudiantes (Argentina)	2–1	(Uruguay) Peñarol
Correa 11'; Carrillo 90+4' (pen.)	Report	Estoyanoff 63'

Estadio Ciudad de La Plata, La Plata
Referee: Enrique Osses (Chile)

October 22, 2014
20:00 UTC−2

Peñarol (Uruguay)	2–1	(Argentina) Estudiantes
Viera 22'; J. J. Rodríguez 45+3'	Report	Carrillo 71'
Penalties
Órteman (penalty scored); Núñez (penalty missed); Estoyanoff (penalty missed); Jorge Rodríguez (penalty missed)	1–3	(penalty scored) Cerutti; (penalty scored) Carrillo; (penalty missed) Damonte; (penalty scored) Rosales

Estadio Centenario, Montevideo
Referee: Leandro Vuaden (Brazil)

Tied 3–3 on aggregate, Estudiantes won on penalties.

=== Match G ===
October 14, 2014
21:30 UTC−3

Cerro Porteño (Paraguay)	2–1	(Argentina) Lanús
Romero 61', 63'	Report	Silva 72'

Estadio Defensores del Chaco, Asunción
Referee: Darío Ubriaco (Uruguay)

October 21, 2014
21:15 UTC−3

Lanús (Argentina)	1–1	(Paraguay) Cerro Porteño
Braghieri 38'	Report	Romero 1'

Estadio Ciudad de Lanús, Lanús
Referee: Roddy Zambrano (Ecuador)

Cerro Porteño won 3–2 on aggregate.

=== Match H ===
October 1, 2014
19:30 UTC−3

Bahia (Brazil)	2–0	(Peru) Universidad César Vallejo
Titi 64'; William Barbio 79'	Report

Itaipava Arena Fonte Nova, Salvador
Referee: Carlos Amarilla (Paraguay)

October 15, 2014
20:00 UTC−5

Universidad César Vallejo (Peru)	2–0	(Brazil) Bahia
Quinteros 82'; Chiroque 90'	Report
Penalties
Tejada (penalty scored); D. Chávez (penalty missed); Chiroque (penalty scored); Pando (penalty scored); Millán (penalty scored); Rabanal (penalty missed); Muente (penalty missed); Morales (penalty scored); Cardoza (penalty scored); Libman (penalty scored)	7–6	(penalty scored) Marcos Aurélio; (penalty missed) Lucas Fonseca; (penalty scored) Henrique; (penalty scored) Titi; (penalty scored) Léo Gago; (penalty missed) Uelliton; (penalty missed) Pará; (penalty scored) William Barbio; (penalty scored) Railan; (penalty missed) Marcelo Lomba

Estadio Mansiche, Trujillo
Referee: Carlos Vera (Ecuador)

Tied 2–2 on aggregate, Universidad César Vallejo won on penalties.

== Quarterfinals ==
The first legs were played on October 29–30, and the second legs were played on November 5–6, 2014.

Team 1	Agg.	Team 2	1st leg	2nd leg
Atlético Nacional (Colombia)	2–0	(Peru) Universidad César Vallejo	1–0	1–0
Boca Juniors (Argentina)	5–1	(Paraguay) Cerro Porteño	1–0	4–1
Estudiantes (Argentina)	3–5	(Argentina) River Plate	1–2	2–3
São Paulo (Brazil)	6–5	(Ecuador) Emelec	4–2	2–3

=== Match S1 ===
October 29, 2014
20:30 UTC−5

Atlético Nacional (Colombia)	1–0	(Peru) Universidad César Vallejo
Bernal 56'	Report

Estadio Atanasio Girardot, Medellín
Referee: Héber Lopes (Brazil)

November 5, 2014
21:30 UTC−5

Universidad César Vallejo (Peru)	0–1	(Colombia) Atlético Nacional
	Report	Cardona 80'

Estadio Mansiche, Trujillo
Referee: Mauro Vigliano (Argentina)

Atlético Nacional won 2–0 on aggregate.

=== Match S2 ===
October 30, 2014
21:30 UTC−3

Boca Juniors (Argentina)	1–0	(Paraguay) Cerro Porteño
Gigliotti 82'	Report

Estadio Alberto J. Armando, Buenos Aires
Referee: Víctor Carrillo (Peru)

November 6, 2014
19:00 UTC−3

Cerro Porteño (Paraguay)	1–4	(Argentina) Boca Juniors
Güiza 27'	Report	Calleri 9'; A. Chávez 66', 85'; Gigliotti 73'

Estadio Defensores del Chaco, Asunción
Referee: Martín Vázquez (Uruguay)

Boca Juniors won 5–1 on aggregate.

=== Match S3 ===
October 29, 2014
20:15 UTC−3

Estudiantes (Argentina)	1–2	(Argentina) River Plate
Vera 45+1'	Report	Mora 52'; Sánchez 71'

Estadio Ciudad de La Plata, La Plata
Referee: Diego Abal (Argentina)

November 6, 2014
21:30 UTC−3

River Plate (Argentina)	3–2	(Argentina) Estudiantes
Gutiérrez 1'; Mora 60'; Funes Mori 62'	Report	Vera 41'; Carrillo 50' (pen.)

Estadio Antonio Vespucio Liberti, Buenos Aires
Referee: Néstor Pitana (Argentina)

River Plate won 5–3 on aggregate.

=== Match S4 ===
October 30, 2014
20:15 UTC−2

São Paulo (Brazil)	4–2	(Ecuador) Emelec
Michel Bastos 11'; Hudson 35'; Alan Kardec 44'; Antônio Carlos 69'	Report	Bolaños 47'; Mena 54'

Estádio Cícero Pompeu de Toledo, São Paulo
Referee: Enrique Cáceres (Paraguay)

November 5, 2014
19:00 UTC−5

Emelec (Ecuador)	3–2	(Brazil) São Paulo
Bolaños 1', 48' (pen.), 52' (pen.)	Report	Alan Kardec 28'; Ganso 39'

Estadio George Capwell, Guayaquil
Referee: Enrique Osses (Chile)

São Paulo won 6–5 on aggregate.

== Semifinals ==
The first legs were played on November 19–20, and the second legs were played on November 26–27, 2014.

Team 1	Agg.	Team 2	1st leg	2nd leg
Atlético Nacional (Colombia)	1–1 (4–1 p)	(Brazil) São Paulo	1–0	0–1
Boca Juniors (Argentina)	0–1	(Argentina) River Plate	0–0	0–1

=== Match F1 ===
November 19, 2014
19:00 UTC−5

Atlético Nacional (Colombia)	1–0	(Brazil) São Paulo
L. Ruiz 34'	Report

Estadio Atanasio Girardot, Medellín
Referee: Daniel Fedorczuk (Uruguay)

November 26, 2014
22:00 UTC−2

São Paulo (Brazil)	1–0	(Colombia) Atlético Nacional
Ganso 53'	Report
Penalties
Alan Kardec (penalty missed); Rogério Ceni (penalty scored); Toloi (penalty missed)	1–4	(penalty scored) Bocanegra; (penalty scored) Valencia; (penalty scored) Cardona; (penalty scored) L. Ruiz

Estádio Cícero Pompeu de Toledo, São Paulo
Referee: Roddy Zambrano (Ecuador)

Tied 1–1 on aggregate, Atlético Nacional won on penalties.

=== Match F2 ===
November 20, 2014
20:45 UTC−3

Boca Juniors (Argentina)	0–0	(Argentina) River Plate
	Report

Estadio Alberto J. Armando, Buenos Aires
Attendance: 50.000
Referee: Silvio Trucco (Argentina)

November 27, 2014
20:45 UTC−3

River Plate (Argentina)	1–0	(Argentina) Boca Juniors
Pisculichi 16'	Report

Estadio Antonio Vespucio Liberti, Buenos Aires
Attendance: 65.250
Referee: Germán Delfino (Argentina)

River Plate won 1–0 on aggregate.

== Finals ==
The finals were played on a home-and-away two-legged basis, with the higher-seeded team hosting the second leg. If tied on aggregate, the away goals rule was not used, and 30 minutes of extra time were played. If still tied after extra time, a penalty shoot-out was used to determine the winner.

The first leg was played on December 3, and the second leg was played on December 10, 2014.

December 3, 2014
19:15 UTC−5

Atlético Nacional (Colombia)	1–1	(Argentina) River Plate
Berrío 34'	Report	Pisculichi 65'

Estadio Atanasio Girardot, Medellín
Attendance: 44,412
Referee: Ricardo Marques (Brazil)

December 10, 2014
21:15 UTC−3

River Plate (Argentina)	2–0	(Colombia) Atlético Nacional
Mercado 54'; Pezzella 58'	Report

Estadio Antonio Vespucio Liberti, Buenos Aires
Referee: Darío Ubriaco (Uruguay)

River Plate won 3–1 on aggregate.
