= 2014 Copa Sudamericana =

Copa Total Sudamericana 2014 Copa Total Sul-Americana 2014

Tournament details
- Dates: 19 August – 10 December 2014
- Teams: 47 (from 10 associations)

Final positions
- Champions: (Argentina) River Plate (1st title)
- Runners-up: (Colombia) Atlético Nacional

Tournament statistics
- Matches played: 92
- Goals scored: 209 (2.27 per match)
- Top scorer(s): (Ecuador) Miller Bolaños (Chile) Andrés Vilches (5 goals each)
- Best player: (Argentina) Marcelo Barovero

The 2014 Copa Sudamericana (officially the 2014 Copa Total Sudamericana for sponsorship reasons) was the 13th edition of the Copa Sudamericana, South America's secondary international club football tournament organized by CONMEBOL. Lanús were the defending champions, but were eliminated by Cerro Porteño in the round of 16.

In the finals, Argentine team River Plate defeated Colombian team Atlético Nacional 3–1 on aggregate to win their first title, and earned the right to play in the 2015 Recopa Sudamericana and the 2015 Suruga Bank Championship.

== Qualified teams ==
Association	Team (Berth)	Entry stage	Qualification method
(Argentina) Argentina; 6 + 1 berths	Lanús (Title holders)	Round of 16	2013 Copa Sudamericana champion
(Argentina) Argentina; 6 + 1 berths	River Plate (Argentina 1)	Second stage	2013–14 Primera División super champion
(Argentina) Argentina; 6 + 1 berths	Boca Juniors (Argentina 2)	Second stage	2013–14 Primera División aggregate table best team not qualified for 2014 Copa Libertadores second stage or Argentina 1 or Argentina 3 of 2015 Copa Libertadores
(Argentina) Argentina; 6 + 1 berths	Estudiantes LP (Argentina 3)	Second stage	2013–14 Primera División aggregate table 2nd best team not qualified for 2014 Copa Libertadores second stage or Argentina 1 or Argentina 3 of 2015 Copa Libertadores
(Argentina) Argentina; 6 + 1 berths	Gimnasia y Esgrima (Argentina 4)	Second stage	2013–14 Primera División aggregate table 3rd best team not qualified for 2014 Copa Libertadores second stage or Argentina 1 or Argentina 3 of 2015 Copa Libertadores
(Argentina) Argentina; 6 + 1 berths	Godoy Cruz (Argentina 5)	Second stage	2013–14 Primera División aggregate table 4th best team not qualified for 2014 Copa Libertadores second stage or Argentina 1 or Argentina 3 of 2015 Copa Libertadores
(Argentina) Argentina; 6 + 1 berths	Rosario Central (Argentina 6)	Second stage	2013–14 Primera División aggregate table 5th best team not qualified for 2014 Copa Libertadores second stage or Argentina 1 or Argentina 3 of 2015 Copa Libertadores
(Bolivia) Bolivia; 4 berths	San José (Bolivia 1)	First stage	2013 Clausura 3rd place
(Bolivia) Bolivia; 4 berths	Jorge Wilstermann (Bolivia 2)	First stage	2013 Apertura 4th place
(Bolivia) Bolivia; 4 berths	Nacional Potosí (Bolivia 3)	First stage	2013 Apertura 5th place
(Bolivia) Bolivia; 4 berths	Universitario de Sucre (Bolivia 4)	First stage	2013 Apertura 6th place
(Brazil) Brazil; 8 berths	Vitória (Brazil 1)	Second stage	2013 Série A or 2013 Série B best team eliminated before 2014 Copa do Brasil round of 16
(Brazil) Brazil; 8 berths	Goiás (Brazil 2)	Second stage	2013 Série A or 2013 Série B 2nd best team eliminated before 2014 Copa do Brasil round of 16
(Brazil) Brazil; 8 berths	São Paulo (Brazil 3)	Second stage	2013 Série A or 2013 Série B 3rd best team eliminated before 2014 Copa do Brasil round of 16
(Brazil) Brazil; 8 berths	Bahia (Brazil 4)	Second stage	2013 Série A or 2013 Série B 4th best team eliminated before 2014 Copa do Brasil round of 16
(Brazil) Brazil; 8 berths	Internacional (Brazil 5)	Second stage	2013 Série A or 2013 Série B 5th best team eliminated before 2014 Copa do Brasil round of 16
(Brazil) Brazil; 8 berths	Criciúma (Brazil 6)	Second stage	2013 Série A or 2013 Série B 6th best team eliminated before 2014 Copa do Brasil round of 16
(Brazil) Brazil; 8 berths	Fluminense (Brazil 7)	Second stage	2013 Série A or 2013 Série B 7th best team eliminated before 2014 Copa do Brasil round of 16
(Brazil) Brazil; 8 berths	Sport Recife (Brazil 8)	Second stage	2014 Copa do Nordeste champion
(Chile) Chile; 4 berths	Deportes Iquique (Chile 1)	First stage	2013–14 Copa Chile champion
(Chile) Chile; 4 berths	Cobresal (Chile 2)	First stage	2014 Clausura Liguilla winner
(Chile) Chile; 4 berths	Universidad Católica (Chile 3)	First stage	2013–14 Primera División aggregate table best team not qualified for 2014 Copa Libertadores second stage
(Chile) Chile; 4 berths	Huachipato (Chile 4)	First stage	2013–14 Copa Chile runner-up
(Colombia) Colombia; 4 berths	Atlético Nacional (Colombia 1)	First stage	2013 Copa Colombia champion
(Colombia) Colombia; 4 berths	Deportivo Cali (Colombia 2)	First stage	2014 Superliga Colombiana champion
(Colombia) Colombia; 4 berths	Millonarios (Colombia 3)	First stage	2013 Primera A aggregate table best team not qualified for 2014 Copa Libertadores
(Colombia) Colombia; 4 berths	Águilas Pereira (Colombia 4)	First stage	2013 Primera A aggregate table 2nd best team not qualified for 2014 Copa Libertadores
(Ecuador) Ecuador; 4 berths	Emelec (Ecuador 1)	First stage	2013 Serie A champion
(Ecuador) Ecuador; 4 berths	Independiente del Valle (Ecuador 2)	First stage	2013 Serie A runner-up
(Ecuador) Ecuador; 4 berths	Universidad Católica (Ecuador 3)	First stage	2013 Serie A aggregate table best team not qualified for 2014 Copa Libertadores
(Ecuador) Ecuador; 4 berths	Barcelona (Ecuador 4)	First stage	2013 Serie A aggregate table 2nd best team not qualified for 2014 Copa Libertadores
(Paraguay) Paraguay; 4 berths	Cerro Porteño (Paraguay 1)	First stage	2013 Primera División tournament champion with better record in aggregate table
(Paraguay) Paraguay; 4 berths	Libertad (Paraguay 2)	First stage	2013 Primera División aggregate table best team not qualified for 2014 Copa Libertadores
(Paraguay) Paraguay; 4 berths	General Díaz (Paraguay 3)	First stage	2013 Primera División aggregate table 2nd best team not qualified for 2014 Copa Libertadores
(Paraguay) Paraguay; 4 berths	Deportivo Capiatá (Paraguay 4)	First stage	2013 Primera División aggregate table 3rd best team not qualified for 2014 Copa Libertadores
(Peru) Peru; 4 berths	Alianza Lima (Peru 1)	First stage	2013 Descentralizado aggregate table best team not qualified for 2014 Copa Libertadores
(Peru) Peru; 4 berths	Universidad César Vallejo (Peru 2)	First stage	2013 Descentralizado aggregate table 2nd best team not qualified for 2014 Copa Libertadores
(Peru) Peru; 4 berths	UTC (Peru 3)	First stage	2013 Descentralizado aggregate table 3rd best team not qualified for 2014 Copa Libertadores
(Peru) Peru; 4 berths	Inti Gas (Peru 4)	First stage	2013 Descentralizado aggregate table 4th best team not qualified for 2014 Copa Libertadores
(Uruguay) Uruguay; 4 berths	Danubio (Uruguay 1)	First stage	2013–14 Primera División champion
(Uruguay) Uruguay; 4 berths	River Plate (Uruguay 2)	First stage	2013–14 Primera División aggregate table best team not qualified for 2015 Copa Libertadores
(Uruguay) Uruguay; 4 berths	Peñarol (Uruguay 3)	First stage	2013–14 Primera División aggregate table 2nd best team not qualified for 2015 Copa Libertadores
(Uruguay) Uruguay; 4 berths	Rentistas (Uruguay 4)	First stage	2013–14 Primera División aggregate table 3rd best team not qualified for 2015 Copa Libertadores
(Venezuela) Venezuela; 4 berths	Caracas (Venezuela 1)	First stage	2013 Copa Venezuela champion
(Venezuela) Venezuela; 4 berths	Deportivo Anzoátegui (Venezuela 2)	First stage	2013–14 Primera División aggregate table 2nd best team not qualified for 2015 Copa Libertadores
(Venezuela) Venezuela; 4 berths	Trujillanos (Venezuela 3)	First stage	2013–14 Primera División Serie Sudamericana winner with better record in aggregate table
(Venezuela) Venezuela; 4 berths	Deportivo La Guaira (Venezuela 4)	First stage	2013–14 Primera División Serie Sudamericana winner with worse record in aggregate table

== Draw ==
Location of teams of the 2014 Copa Sudamericana.

The draw of the tournament was held on May 20, 2014 in Buenos Aires, Argentina.

Excluding the defending champion (entering in the round of 16), the other 46 teams were divided into four zones:

- South Zone: Teams from Bolivia, Chile, Paraguay, and Uruguay (entering in the first stage)
- North Zone: Teams from Colombia, Ecuador, Peru, and Venezuela (entering in the first stage)
- Argentina Zone: Teams from Argentina (entering in the second stage)
- Brazil Zone: Teams from Brazil (entering in the second stage)

The draw mechanism was as follows:

- South Zone and North Zone:
  - For the first stage, the 16 teams from the South Zone were drawn into eight ties, and the 16 teams from the North Zone were drawn into the other eight ties. Teams which qualified for berths 1 were drawn against teams which qualified for berths 4, and teams which qualified for berths 2 were drawn against teams which qualified for berths 3, with the former hosting the second leg in both cases. Teams from the same association could not be drawn into the same tie.
  - For the second stage, the 16 winners of the first stage were drawn into eight ties. The eight winners from the South Zone were drawn against the eight winners from the North Zone, with the former hosting the second leg in four ties, and the latter hosting the second leg in the other four ties.
- Argentina Zone: The six teams were drawn into three ties. Teams which qualified for berths 1–3 were drawn against teams which qualified for berths 4–6, with the former hosting the second leg.
- Brazil Zone: The eight teams were split into four ties. No draw was held, where the matchups were based on the berths which the teams qualified for: 1 vs. 8, 2 vs. 7, 3 vs. 6, 4 vs. 5, with the former hosting the second leg.

To determine the bracket starting from the round of 16, the defending champion and the 15 winners of the second stage were assigned a "seed" by draw. The defending champion and the winners from Argentina Zone and Brazil Zone were assigned odd-numbered "seeds", and the winners from ties between South Zone and North Zone were assigned even-numbered "seeds".

== Schedule ==
The schedule of the competition was as follows (all dates listed are Wednesdays, but matches may be played on Tuesdays and Thursdays as well).

Stage	First leg	Second leg
First stage	August 20	August 27
Second stage	August 27; September 3, 10, 17	September 3, 17, 24
Round of 16	October 1, 15	October 15, 22
Quarterfinals	October 29	November 5
Semifinals	November 19	November 26
Finals	December 3	December 10

== Elimination phase ==
In the elimination phase, each tie was played on a home-and-away two-legged basis. If tied on aggregate, the away goals rule was used. If still tied, the penalty shoot-out was used to determine the winner (no extra time was played). The 15 winners of the second stage (three from Argentina Zone, four from Brazil Zone, eight from ties between South Zone and North Zone) advanced to the round of 16 to join the defending champion (Lanús).

=== First stage ===
Team 1	Agg.	Team 2	1st leg	2nd leg
South Zone
Huachipato (Chile)	6–3	(Bolivia) San José	3–1	3–2
Universitario de Sucre (Bolivia)	2–1	(Chile) Deportes Iquique	2–0	0–1
Deportivo Capiatá (Paraguay)	5–3	(Uruguay) Danubio	3–1	2–2
Rentistas (Uruguay)	1–2	(Paraguay) Cerro Porteño	0–2	1–0
General Díaz (Paraguay)	4–3	(Chile) Cobresal	2–1	2–2
Nacional Potosí (Bolivia)	1–3	(Paraguay) Libertad	1–0	0–3
Universidad Católica (Chile)	0–4	(Uruguay) River Plate	0–1	0–3
Peñarol (Uruguay)	6–0	(Bolivia) Jorge Wilstermann	2–0	4–0
North Zone
Inti Gas (Peru)	0–2	(Venezuela) Caracas	0–1	0–1
Barcelona (Ecuador)	3–0	(Peru) Alianza Lima	3–0	0–0
Deportivo La Guaira (Venezuela)	1–2	(Colombia) Atlético Nacional	1–1	0–1
Águilas Pereira (Colombia)	2–3	(Ecuador) Emelec	1–1	1–2
UTC (Peru)	0–3	(Colombia) Deportivo Cali	0–0	0–3
Millonarios (Colombia)	3–4	(Peru) Universidad César Vallejo	1–2	2–2
Trujillanos (Venezuela)	1–2	(Ecuador) Independiente del Valle	0–1	1–1
Universidad Católica (Ecuador)	2–2 (5–4 p)	(Venezuela) Deportivo Anzoátegui	1–1	1–1

=== Second stage ===
Team 1	Agg.	Team 2	1st leg	2nd leg
Sport Recife (Brazil)	1–3	(Brazil) Vitória	0–1	1–2
Deportivo Capiatá (Paraguay)	4–2	(Venezuela) Caracas	1–1	3–1
Godoy Cruz (Argentina)	0–3	(Argentina) River Plate	0–1	0–2
Huachipato (Chile)	2–1	(Ecuador) Universidad Católica	2–0	0–1
Fluminense (Brazil)	2–2 (a)	(Brazil) Goiás	2–1	0–1
Peñarol (Uruguay)	3–2	(Colombia) Deportivo Cali	2–2	1–0
Universitario de Sucre (Bolivia)	2–5	(Peru) Universidad César Vallejo	2–2	0–3
Internacional (Brazil)	1–3	(Brazil) Bahia	0–2	1–1
Independiente del Valle (Ecuador)	1–3	(Paraguay) Cerro Porteño	1–0	0–3
Gimnasia y Esgrima (Argentina)	0–1	(Argentina) Estudiantes LP	0–0	0–1
Emelec (Ecuador)	3–2	(Uruguay) River Plate	2–1	1–1
Criciúma (Brazil)	2–3	(Brazil) São Paulo	2–1	0–2
Barcelona (Ecuador)	1–2	(Paraguay) Libertad	1–0	0–2
Rosario Central (Argentina)	1–4	(Argentina) Boca Juniors	1–1	0–3
Atlético Nacional (Colombia)	(a) 3–3	(Paraguay) General Díaz	0–2	3–1

== Final stages ==
In the final stages, the 16 teams played a single-elimination tournament, with the following rules:

- Each tie was played on a home-and-away two-legged basis, with the higher-seeded team hosting the second leg.
- In the round of 16, quarterfinals, and semifinals, if tied on aggregate, the away goals rule was used. If still tied, a penalty shoot-out was used to determine the winner (no extra time was played).
- In the finals, if tied on aggregate, the away goals rule was not used, and 30 minutes of extra time were played. If still tied after extra time, a penalty shoot-out was used to determine the winner.
- If there were two semifinalists from the same association, they had to play each other.

=== Bracket ===
Round of 16
16	(Colombia) Atlético Nacional	2	1	3
1	(Brazil) Vitória	2	0	2
9	(Brazil) Bahia	2	0	2 (6)
8	(Peru) Univ. César Vallejo (p)	0	2	2 (7)
13	(Brazil) São Paulo	1	3	4
4	(Chile) Huachipato	0	2	2
12	(Ecuador) Emelec (p)	1	0	1 (6)
5	(Brazil) Goiás	0	1	1 (5)
15	(Argentina) Boca Juniors (p)	0	1	1 (4)
2	(Paraguay) Deportivo Capiatá	1	0	1 (3)
10	(Paraguay) Cerro Porteño	2	1	3
7	(Argentina) Lanús	1	1	2
11	(Argentina) Estudiantes LP (p)	2	1	3 (3)
6	(Uruguay) Peñarol	1	2	3 (1)
14	(Paraguay) Libertad	1	0	1
3	(Argentina) River Plate	3	2	5

Quarterfinals
16	(Colombia) Atlético Nacional	1	1	2
8	(Peru) Univ. César Vallejo	0	0	0
13	(Brazil) São Paulo	4	2	6
12	(Ecuador) Emelec	2	3	5
15	(Argentina) Boca Juniors	1	4	5
10	(Paraguay) Cerro Porteño	0	1	1
11	(Argentina) Estudiantes LP	1	2	3
3	(Argentina) River Plate	2	3	5

Semifinals
16	(Colombia) Atlético Nacional (p)	1	0	1 (4)
13	(Brazil) São Paulo	0	1	1 (1)
15	(Argentina) Boca Juniors	0	0	0
3	(Argentina) River Plate	0	1	1

Finals
16	(Colombia) Atlético Nacional	1	0	1
3	(Argentina) River Plate	1	2	3

=== Round of 16 ===
Team 1	Agg.	Team 2	1st leg	2nd leg
Atlético Nacional (Colombia)	3–2	(Brazil) Vitória	2–2	1–0
Boca Juniors (Argentina)	1–1 (4–3 p)	(Paraguay) Deportivo Capiatá	0–1	1–0
Libertad (Paraguay)	1–5	(Argentina) River Plate	1–3	0–2
São Paulo (Brazil)	4–2	(Chile) Huachipato	1–0	3–2
Emelec (Ecuador)	1–1 (6–5 p)	(Brazil) Goiás	1–0	0–1
Estudiantes LP (Argentina)	3–3 (3–1 p)	(Uruguay) Peñarol	2–1	1–2
Cerro Porteño (Paraguay)	3–2	(Argentina) Lanús	2–1	1–1
Bahia (Brazil)	2–2 (6–7 p)	(Peru) Universidad César Vallejo	2–0	0–2

=== Quarterfinals ===
Team 1	Agg.	Team 2	1st leg	2nd leg
Atlético Nacional (Colombia)	2–0	(Peru) Universidad César Vallejo	1–0	1–0
Boca Juniors (Argentina)	5–1	(Paraguay) Cerro Porteño	1–0	4–1
Estudiantes LP (Argentina)	3–5	(Argentina) River Plate	1–2	2–3
São Paulo (Brazil)	6–5	(Ecuador) Emelec	4–2	2–3

=== Semifinals ===
This was the first time the Superclásico derby matches between Boca Juniors and River Plate were played in the Copa Sudamericana.

Team 1	Agg.	Team 2	1st leg	2nd leg
Atlético Nacional (Colombia)	1–1 (4–1 p)	(Brazil) São Paulo	1–0	0–1
Boca Juniors (Argentina)	0–1	(Argentina) River Plate	0–0	0–1

=== Finals ===
The finals were played on a home-and-away two-legged basis, with the higher-seeded team hosting the second leg. If tied on aggregate, the away goals rule was not used, and 30 minutes of extra time were played. If still tied after extra time, a penalty shoot-out was used to determine the winner.

December 3, 2014
19:15 UTC−5

Atlético Nacional (Colombia)	1–1	(Argentina) River Plate
Berrío 34'	Report	Pisculichi 65'

Estadio Atanasio Girardot, Medellín
Attendance: 44.412
Referee: Ricardo Marques (Brazil)

December 10, 2014
21:15 UTC−3

River Plate (Argentina)	2–0	(Colombia) Atlético Nacional
Mercado 54'; Pezzella 58'	Report

Estadio Antonio Vespucio Liberti, Buenos Aires
Attendance: 68.500
Referee: Darío Ubriaco (Uruguay)

River Plate won 3–1 on aggregate.

== Top goalscorers ==
Rank	Player	Team	Goals
1	(Ecuador) Miller Bolaños	(Ecuador) Emelec	5
1	(Chile) Andrés Vilches	(Chile) Huachipato	5
3	(Argentina) Andrés Chávez	(Argentina) Boca Juniors	4
3	(Paraguay) Fabio Escobar	(Paraguay) Deportivo Capiatá	4
3	(Uruguay) Rodrigo Mora	(Argentina) River Plate	4
3	(Peru) Andy Pando	(Peru) Universidad César Vallejo	4
3	(Paraguay) Óscar Romero	(Paraguay) Cerro Porteño	4
8	(Colombia) Edwin Cardona	(Colombia) Atlético Nacional	3
8	(Argentina) Guido Carrillo	(Argentina) Estudiantes LP	3
8	(Brazil) Erik	(Brazil) Goiás	3
8	(Paraguay) Roberto Gamarra	(Paraguay) General Díaz	3
8	(Brazil) Ganso	(Brazil) São Paulo	3
8	(Uruguay) Hernán Rodrigo López	(Paraguay) Libertad	3
8	(Ecuador) Ángel Mena	(Ecuador) Emelec	3
8	(Brazil) Michel Bastos	(Brazil) São Paulo	3
8	(Peru) Ronald Quinteros	(Peru) Universidad César Vallejo	3
8	(Uruguay) Jonathan Rodríguez	(Uruguay) Peñarol	3
8	(Colombia) Luis Carlos Ruiz	(Colombia) Atlético Nacional	3
8	(Uruguay) Michael Santos	(Uruguay) River Plate	3
8	(Uruguay) Diego Vera	(Argentina) Estudiantes LP	3

== See also ==
- 2014 Copa Libertadores
- 2015 Recopa Sudamericana
- 2015 Suruga Bank Championship
