= Leandro Rodríguez =

Uruguayan footballer (born 1992)

Personal information
- Full name: Leandro Joaquín Rodríguez Telechea
- Date of birth: 19 November 1992 (age 33)
- Place of birth: Montevideo, Uruguay
- Height: 1.79 m (5 ft 10 1/2 in)
- Position: Forward

Team information
- Current team: Bella Vista
- Number: 24

Youth career
- –2012: River Plate

Senior career*
Years	Team	Apps	(Gls)
2012–2015	River Plate	71	(19)
2015–2017	Everton	0	(0)
2016	→ Brentford (loan)	2	(0)
2017	→ Waasland-Beveren (loan)	0	(0)
2017–2018	Danubio	21	(3)
2018–2019	Torque	10	(2)
2019	Racing Club	8	(1)
2019–2020	Alebrijes de Oaxaca	17	(2)
2020–2021	Danubio	28	(4)
2022	Rentistas	5	(0)
2023	Portogruaro	9	(0)
2023–	Bella Vista	3	(0)
- * Club domestic league appearances and goals as of 17:58, 14 January 2024 (UTC)

Leandro Joaquín Rodríguez Telechea (born 19 November 1992) is a Uruguayan professional footballer who plays as a forward for Bella Vista.

== Career ==
=== River Plate ===
Born in Montevideo, Rodríguez began his career with River Plate Montevideo. He made his debut on 25 August 2012 in the season's first game, which was a 1–0 win over Juventud de Las Piedras at the Estadio Saroldi. On 30 September he scored his first goal, which was the opener in a 2–0 home victory over Liverpool. He ended his first season with three goals in 24 appearances.

On 17 August 2013, Rodríguez scored as River began the new season with a 4–2 win against reigning champions CA Peñarol at the Estadio Centenario. He scored again on 2 March 2014 in a 3–0 home win over Uruguay's other leading club, Nacional. Three weeks later, as a 43rd-minute substitute for Jonathan Ramírez, Rodríguez scored the only goal in a victory against neighbourhood rivals Wanderers. On 11 May, he was sent off in a 0–2 home defeat to Racing, along with teammate Sebastián Taborda. His seven goals in 23 games in this second season helped the club qualify for the 2014 Copa Sudamericana, where they were drawn against Ecuador's Club Sport Emelec in the first stage. In the second leg on 25 September, he equalised for a 1–1 draw, but River were eliminated 3–2 on aggregate.

The 2014–15 season was Rodríguez's most successful for River Plate. He scored nine goals in 23 games, including his first two-goal haul in a 4–0 home victory over Rampla Juniors on 8 March 2015. Six days later, he hit the winner in a 2–1 victory over Nacional at Estadio Gran Parque Central.

=== Everton ===
On 28 August 2015, Rodríguez signed a four-year contract with Everton of the Premier League for a reported fee of £500,000. Manager Roberto Martínez said that he would likely be put into the first team due to his experience in top-flight football in his homeland. However, Rodríguez made his debut for the under-21 team on 7 September. In his debut, he would head in Ryan Ledson's cross to open a 3–0 home win over Preston North End in the Lancashire Senior Cup. Fifteen days later, he was included in the senior squad for the first time, but remained on the bench as an unused substitute in a 2–1 win away to Reading in the second round of the League Cup. Rodríguez made his Everton first team debut on 9 January 2016 in the third round of the FA Cup when he replaced Aaron Lennon for the final minute of a 2–0 win over Dagenham & Redbridge at Goodison Park.

On 17 March 2016, Rodríguez joined Championship club Brentford on a one-month loan. He made his debut three days later in a 0–1 home loss to Blackburn Rovers when he played 76 minutes before being replaced by Scott Hogan. He suffered a pulled hamstring on his second appearance and returned to Goodison Park when his loan expired. On 31 January, he joined Waasland-Beveren on loan.

=== Return to Latin America ===
In August 2017, Rodríguez left Everton and returned to Uruguay to join Danubio. A year later, he joined fellow Uruguayan Primera División side Torque.

After several months with Racing Club de Montevideo, Rodríguez went abroad again in July 2019, joining Alebrijes de Oaxaca in Mexico's Ascenso MX.

== Personal life ==
Rodríguez also holds an Italian passport. His older brother Diego is a defender who played for Wanderers, Juventud, Málaga and Vancouver Whitecaps.

== Career statistics ==
As of match played 9 April 2016.

Club	Season	League			National Cup		League Cup		Other		Total	
Club	Season	Division	Apps	Goals	Apps	Goals	Apps	Goals	Apps	Goals	Apps	Goals
River Plate Montevideo	2012–13	Uruguayan Primera División	24	3	—		—		—		24	3
River Plate Montevideo	2013–14	Uruguayan Primera División	23	7	—		—		3 (Note: Appearances in Copa Sudamericana.)	0	26	7
River Plate Montevideo	2014–15	Uruguayan Primera División	23	9	—		—		4	1	27	10
River Plate Montevideo	2015–16	Uruguayan Primera División	1	0	—		—		—		1	0
River Plate Montevideo	Total		71	19	—		—		7	1	78	20
Everton	2015–16	Premier League	0	0	1	0	0	0	—		1	0
Brentford (loan)	2015–16	Championship	2	0	—		—		—		2	0
Career total			73	19	1	0	0	0	7	1	81	20
