= 2015–16 Everton F.C. season =

English football club season

Everton
2015–16 season
- Chairman: Bill Kenwright
- Manager: Roberto Martínez (until 12 May 2016); David Unsworth, Joe Royle (from 12 May 2016)
- Stadium: Goodison Park
- Premier League: 11th
- FA Cup: Semi-Final
- League Cup: Semi-Final
- Top goalscorer: League: Romelu Lukaku (18); All: Romelu Lukaku (25)
- Highest home attendance: 39,598 vs Liverpool (4 October 2015)
- Lowest home attendance: 35,736 vs Crystal Palace (7 December 2015)
- Average home league attendance: 38,228
Home colours	Away colours	Third colours

The 2015–16 season was Everton's 62nd consecutive season in the top flight of English football and their 138th year in existence. Everton participated in the Premier League, FA Cup and League Cup. The season covers the period from 1 July 2015 to 30 June 2016. Although the club managed to reach the semi-finals in both the FA Cup and League Cup, their overall performance did not meet expectations. As a result, prior to its last Premier League match of the season, the club sacked third year manager Roberto Martínez.

== Kits ==
Home	Alt. Home	Alt. Home 2	Alt. Home 3

Away	Third

== First team ==
Last updated on 3 February 2016

Squad No.	Name	Nationality	Position(s)	Date of Birth (Age)
Goalkeepers
1	Joel Robles	(Spain)	GK	17 June 1990 (age 36)
24	Tim Howard	(United States)	GK	6 March 1979 (age 47)
Defenders
2	Tony Hibbert	(England)	RB	20 February 1981 (age 45)
3	Leighton Baines	(England)	LB	11 December 1984 (age 41)
5	John Stones	(England)	CB	28 May 1994 (age 32)
6	Phil Jagielka (captain)	(England)	CB	17 August 1982 (age 44)
23	Séamus Coleman	(Republic of Ireland)	RB	11 October 1988 (age 38)
25	Ramiro Funes Mori	(Argentina)	CB/LB	5 March 1991 (age 35)
27	Tyias Browning	(England)	RB	27 May 1994 (age 32)
30	Mason Holgate	(England)	RB/CB	22 October 1996 (age 30)
32	Brendan Galloway	(England)	LB/CB	17 March 1996 (age 30)
38	Matthew Pennington	(England)	CB	6 October 1994 (age 32)
Midfielders
4	Darron Gibson	(Republic of Ireland)	CM	25 October 1987 (age 39)
8	Bryan Oviedo	(Costa Rica)	LM/LB/LW	18 February 1990 (age 36)
12	Aaron Lennon	(England)	RW	16 April 1987 (age 39)
15	Tom Cleverley	(England)	CM	12 August 1989 (age 37)
16	James McCarthy	(Republic of Ireland)	CM/DM	12 November 1990 (age 36)
17	Muhamed Bešić	(Bosnia and Herzegovina)	DM	10 September 1992 (age 34)
18	Gareth Barry	(England)	DM/CM	23 February 1981 (age 45)
20	Ross Barkley	(England)	AM	5 December 1993 (age 32)
21	Leon Osman	(England)	AM	17 May 1981 (age 45)
22	Steven Pienaar	(South Africa)	LW/RW/AM	17 March 1982 (age 44)
Forwards
9	Arouna Koné	(Ivory Coast)	FW	11 November 1983 (age 43)
10	Romelu Lukaku	(Belgium)	FW	13 May 1993 (age 33)
11	Kevin Mirallas	(Belgium)	LW/RW	5 October 1987 (age 39)
14	Oumar Niasse	(Senegal)	FW/LW/RW	18 April 1990 (age 36)
19	Gerard Deulofeu	(Spain)	RW	13 March 1994 (age 32)
28	Leandro Rodríguez	(Uruguay)	FW	19 November 1992 (age 34)

=== Player awards ===
- Player of the Season – Gareth Barry
- Players' Player of the Season – Gareth Barry
- Young Player of the Season – Romelu Lukaku
- Reserve / U21 Player of the Season – Joe Williams
- Goal of the Season – Romelu Lukaku vs. Chelsea

== Transfers ==
=== Transfers in ===
Date from	Position	Nationality	Name	From	Fee	Ref.
1 July 2015	MF	ENG	Tom Cleverley	Manchester United	Free Transfer	
1 July 2015	FW	ESP	Gerard Deulofeu	Barcelona	£4,200,000	
3 July 2015	FW	BEL	David Henen	Olympiacos	£200,000	
12 August 2015	DF	ENG	Mason Holgate	Barnsley	£2,000,000	
28 August 2015	FW	URU	Leandro Rodríguez	River Plate (URU)	£500,000	
1 September 2015	DF	ARG	Ramiro Funes Mori	River Plate	£9,500,000	
1 September 2015	RW	ENG	Aaron Lennon	Tottenham Hotspur	£4,000,000	
2 January 2016	CB	ENG	Matthew Foulds	Bury	Undisclosed	
7 January 2016	FW	SUI	Shani Tarashaj	Grasshoppers	£3,000,000	
1 February 2016	FW	SEN	Oumar Niasse	Lokomotiv Moscow	£13,500,000	

Total spending: ▼£36,700,000

=== Transfers out ===
Date from	Position	Nationality	Name	To	Fee	Ref.
1 July 2015	DF	PAR	Antolín Alcaraz	Las Palmas	Free Transfer	(Note: Following Alcaraz's release he joined Las Palmas.)
1 July 2015	DF	FRA	Sylvain Distin	AFC Bournemouth	Free Transfer	(Note: Following Distin's release he joined Bournemouth.)
1 July 2015	MF	ENG	George Green	Oldham Athletic	Free Transfer	(Note: Following Green's release he joined Oldham Athletic.)
1 July 2015	DF	ENG	Curtis Langton	—	Free Transfer	
1 July 2015	MF	ENG	John Lundstram	Oxford United	Free Transfer	(Note: Following Lundstram's release he joined Oxford United.)
1 July 2015	DF	IRE	Ben McLaughlin	Derry City	Free Transfer	(Note: Following McLaughlin's release he joined Derry City.)
1 July 2015	DF	ENG	Arlen Birch	Burnley	Free Transfer	(Note: Following Birch's release he joined Burnley.)
1 July 2015	FW	ENG	Charley Edge	Colchester United	Free Transfer	(Note: Following Edge's release he joined Colchester United.)
1 July 2015	FW	ENG	George Newell	Bolton Wanderers	Free Transfer	
28 July 2015	FW	ENG	Chris Long	Burnley	£500,000	
19 January 2016	FW	SCO	Steven Naismith	Norwich City	£8,500,000	

Total incoming: ▲£9,000,000

=== Loans out ===
Date from	Position	Nationality	Name	To	Date until	Ref.
21 July 2015	MF	POR	Francisco Júnior	Wigan Athletic	16 January 2016 (Note: Júnior's loan was extended on 21 August 2015, until 16 January 2016.)	
21 July 2015	DF	ENG	Jonjoe Kenny	Wigan Athletic	15 September 2015	
25 July 2015	DF	ENG	Luke Garbutt	Fulham	30 June 2016	
7 August 2015	FW	ENG	Calum Dyson	Stockport County	4 September 2015	
7 August 2015	DF	ENG	Jordan Thorniley	Stockport County	4 September 2015	
14 September 2015	FW	ENG	Conor McAleny	Charlton Athletic	7 November 2015	
28 September 2015	GK	CZE	Jindřich Staněk	Hyde United	26 October 2015	
27 January 2016	DF	ENG	Jonjoe Kenny	Oxford United	End of season	
1 February 2016	RW	IRL	Aiden McGeady	Sheffield Wednesday	30 June 2016	
1 February 2016	FW	ENG	Conor McAleny	Wigan Athletic	30 June 2016	
3 March 2016	DF	ENG	Callum Connolly	Barnsley	3 April 2016	
17 March 2016	FW	URU	Leandro Rodríguez	Brentford	14 April 2016	
24 March 2016	DF	ENG	Matthew Pennington	Walsall	End of season	

== Competitions ==
=== Pre-season and Friendlies ===
On 22 June 2015, Everton announced they would face Leeds United during pre-season. On 29 June 2015, Everton announced their full preseason fixtures list.

11 July 2015 Friendly	Swindon Town	0–4	Everton	Swindon, Wilts.
15:00 BST		Report	Mirallas 49', 53'; Lukaku 89'; McAleny 90'	Stadium: County Ground

15 July 2015 2015 Premier League Asia Trophy	Everton	0–0 (5–4 p)	Stoke City	Kallang, Singapore
18:00 BST		Report		Stadium: National Stadium
	Penalties
	Lukaku (penalty scored); Cleverley (penalty scored); Stones (penalty scored); Deulofeu (penalty scored); Jagielka (penalty scored)		(penalty scored) Adam; (penalty missed) Van Ginkel; (penalty scored) Walters; (penalty scored) Bardsley; (penalty scored) Crouch

18 July 2015 2015 Premier League Asia Trophy	Everton	1–3	Arsenal	Kallang, Singapore
13:30 BST	Barkley 75'		Walcott 22'; Cazorla 58'; Özil 62'	Stadium: National Stadium; Attendance: 53,118

26 July 2015 Friendly	Hearts	1–3	Everton	Edinburgh, Scotland
15:00 BST	Paterson 9'	Report	Lukaku 18' (pen.), 35', 77' (pen.)	Stadium: Tynecastle

28 July 2015 Friendly	Dundee	0–2	Everton	Dundee, Scotland
19:30 BST		Report	McAleny 2'; Barkley 58' (pen.)	Stadium: Dens Park

1 August 2015 Friendly	Leeds	2–0	Everton	Leeds, Yorkshire
15:00 BST	Mowatt 57'; Wood 80'	Report		Stadium: Elland Road

2 August 2015 Duncan Ferguson Testimonial	Everton	1–2	Villarreal	Liverpool, England
15:00 BST	Browning 85'	Report	Gerard 38'; Matías Nahuel 61'	Stadium: Goodison Park; Attendance: 34,718

=== Premier League ===
==== League table ====
Pos	Team	Pld	W	D	L	GF	GA	GD	Pts
9	Stoke City	38	14	9	15	41	55	−14	51
10	Chelsea	38	12	14	12	59	53	+6	50
11	Everton	38	11	14	13	59	55	+4	47
12	Swansea City	38	12	11	15	42	52	−10	47
13	Watford	38	12	9	17	40	50	−10	45

Source: Barclays Premier League
Rules for classification: 1) Points; 2) Goal difference; 3) Goals scored; 4) Play-offs (only if needed to decide champion, teams for relegation or teams for UEFA competitions).

==== Results by matchday ====
Matchday	1	2	3	4	5	6	7	8	9	10	11	12	13	14	15	16	17	18	19	20	21	22	23	24	25	26	27	28	29	30	31	32	33	34	35	36	37	38
Ground	H	A	H	A	H	A	A	H	H	A	H	A	H	A	H	A	H	A	H	H	A	A	H	H	A	H	A	H	H	A	A	A	H	A	H	A	A	H
Result	D	W	L	D	W	D	W	D	L	L	W	D	W	D	D	D	L	W	L	D	D	D	L	W	W	L	W	L	L	L	D	D	D	L	W	L	L	W
Position	5	1	7	9	5	6	5	7	9	10	9	8	7	7	9	9	10	9	11	11	11	11	12	11	8	11	10	11	12	14	12	12	11	11	11	12	13	11

Updated to match(es) played on 15 May 2016. Source: Statto
A = Away; H = Home; W = Win; D = Draw; L = Loss

==== Matches ====
On 17 June 2015, the fixtures for the forthcoming season were announced.

8 August 2015 1	Everton	2–2	Watford	Liverpool, Lancs.
15:00 BST	Barkley 76'; Koné 86'	Report	Layún 14'; Ighalo 83'	Stadium: Goodison Park; Attendance: 39,063; Referee: Mike Jones

15 August 2015 2	Southampton	0–3	Everton	Southampton, Hants.
12:45 BST		Report	Lukaku 22', 45'; Barkley 84'	Stadium: St. Mary's Stadium; Attendance: 30,966; Referee: Michael Oliver

23 August 2015 3	Everton	0–2	Man City	Liverpool, Lancs.
16:00 BST		Report	Kolarov 60'; Nasri 88'	Stadium: Goodison Park; Attendance: 38,523; Referee: Anthony Taylor

29 August 2015 4	Tottenham	0–0	Everton	Tottenham
15:00 BST		Report		Stadium: White Hart Lane; Attendance: 35,865; Referee: Mike Jones

12 September 2015 5	Everton	3–1	Chelsea	Liverpool, Lancs.
12:45 BST	Naismith 17', 22', 82'	Report	Matić 36'	Stadium: Goodison Park; Attendance: 38,311; Referee: Andre Marriner

19 September 2015 6	Swansea	0–0	Everton	Swansea, Wales
15:00 BST		Report	Mirallas (red card) 90'	Stadium: Liberty Stadium; Attendance: 20,805; Referee: Stuart Attwell

28 September 2015 7	West Brom	2–3	Everton	West Bromwich
20:00 BST	Berahino 41'; Dawson 54'	Report	Lukaku 55', 84'; Koné 75'	Stadium: The Hawthorns; Attendance: 24,240; Referee: Robert Madley

4 October 2015 8	Everton	1–1	Liverpool	Walton, Liverpool
13:30 BST	Lukaku 45+1'	Report	Ings 41'	Stadium: Goodison Park; Attendance: 39,598; Referee: Martin Atkinson

17 October 2015 9	Everton	0–3	Man Utd	Liverpool, Lancs.
17:00 BST		Report	Schneiderlin 18'; Herrera 22'; Rooney 62'	Stadium: Goodison Park; Attendance: 39,553; Referee: Jonathan Moss

24 October 2015 10	Arsenal	2–1	Everton	Holloway
BST	Giroud 36'; Koscielny 38'	Report	Barkley 44'; Barry (yellow card) 67' (red card) 90+4'	Stadium: Emirates Stadium; Attendance: 59,985; Referee: Lee Mason

1 November 2015 11	Everton	6–2	Sunderland	Liverpool, Lancs.
13:30 GMT	Deulofeu 19'; Koné 31', 62', 76'; Coates 55' (o.g.); Lukaku 60'	Report	Defoe 45'; Fletcher 50'	Stadium: Goodison Park; Attendance: 36,617; Referee: Andre Marriner

7 November 2015 12	West Ham	1–1	Everton	Upton Park
15:00 GMT	Lanzini 30'	Report	Lukaku 43'	Stadium: Boleyn Ground; Attendance: 34,977; Referee: Paul Tierney

21 November 2015 13	Everton	4–0	Aston Villa	Liverpool, Lancs.
15:00 GMT	Barkley 17', 42'; Lukaku 28', 59'	Report		Stadium: Goodison Park; Attendance: 38,424; Referee: Michael Oliver

28 November 2015 14	Bournemouth	3–3	Everton	Bournemouth
15:00 GMT	Smith 80'; Stanislas 87', 90+8'	Report	Funes Mori 25'; Lukaku 36'; Barkley 90+5'	Stadium: Dean Court; Attendance: 11,228; Referee: Kevin Friend

7 December 2015 15	Everton	1–1	Crystal Palace	Liverpool, Lancs.
19:45 GMT	Lukaku 81'	Report	Dann 76'	Stadium: Goodison Park; Attendance: 35,736; Referee: Craig Pawson

12 December 2015 16	Norwich	1–1	Everton	Norwich, Norf.
12:45 GMT	Hoolahan 47'	Report	Lukaku 15'	Stadium: Carrow Road; Attendance: 27,027; Referee: Martin Atkinson

19 December 2015 17	Everton	2–3	Leicester	Liverpool, Lancs.
15:00 GMT	Lukaku 32'; Kevin Mirallas 89'	Report	Mahrez 27' (pen.), 65' (pen.); Okazaki 69'	Stadium: Goodison Park; Attendance: 39,570; Referee: Jonathan Moss

26 December 2015 18	Newcastle	0–1	Everton	Newcastle, Northd.
17:30 GMT		Report	Cleverley 90+3'	Stadium: St James' Park; Attendance: 51,682; Referee: Lee Mason

28 December 2015 19	Everton	3–4	Stoke City	Liverpool, Lancs.
15:00 GMT	Lukaku 22', 64'; Deulofeu 71'	Report	Shaqiri 16', 45'; Joselu 80'; Arnautović 90+1' (pen.)	Stadium: Goodison Park; Attendance: 39,340; Referee: Mark Clattenburg

3 January 2016 20	Everton	1–1	Tottenham	Liverpool, Lancs.
16:00 GMT	Lennon 22'	Report	Alli 45'	Stadium: Goodison Park; Attendance: 38,482; Referee: Michael Oliver

13 January 2016 21	Man City	0–0	Everton	Manchester, Lancs.
19:45 GMT		Report	Bešić (yellow card) 50'	Stadium: City of Manchester Stadium; Attendance: 53,796; Referee: Roger East

16 January 2016 22	Chelsea	3–3	Everton	Fulham
15:00 GMT	Costa 64'; Fàbregas 66'; Terry 90+8'	Report	Terry 50' (o.g.); Mirallas 56'; Funes Mori 90'	Stadium: Stamford Bridge; Attendance: 41,633; Referee: Mike Jones

24 January 2016 23	Everton	1–2	Swansea	Liverpool, Lancs.
13:30 GMT (UTC+00:00)	Cork 26' (o.g.)	Report	Sigurðsson 17' (pen.), (yellow card) 66'; Ayew 34'; Rangel (yellow card) 43'; Fabiański (yellow card) 52'	Stadium: Goodison Park; Referee: Anthony Taylor

3 February 2016 24	Everton	3–0	Newcastle	Liverpool, Lancs.
19:45 GMT (UTC+00:00)	Lennon 23'; Coleman (yellow card) 74'; Barkley 88' (pen.), 90+4' (pen.)	Report	Shelvey (yellow card) 61'; Lascelles (red card) 90+3'	Stadium: Goodison Park; Attendance: 36,061; Referee: Craig Pawson

6 February 2016 25	Stoke City	0–3	Everton	Stoke, Staffs.
15:00 GMT (UTC+00:00)	Diouf (yellow card) 59'	Report	Lukaku 11' (pen.); Coleman 28'; Lennon 42'	Stadium: Britannia Stadium; Attendance: 27,733; Referee: Andre Marriner

13 February 2016 26	Everton	0–1	West Brom	Liverpool, Lancs.
15:00 GMT (UTC+00:00)		Report	Rondón 14'	Stadium: Goodison Park; Attendance: 38,103; Referee: Michael Oliver

1 March 2016 27	Aston Villa	1–3	Everton	Aston, Birmingham
19:45 GMT (UTC+00:00)	Gestede 79'	Report	Funes Mori 5'; Lennon 30'; Lukaku 60'	Stadium: Villa Park; Attendance: 29,755; Referee: Roger East

5 March 2016 28	Everton	2–3	West Ham	Liverpool, Lancs.
15:00 GMT	Lukaku 13'; Mirallas (yellow card) 16' (yellow-red card) 34'; Lennon 56'; Robles (yellow card) 75'; Barkley (yellow card) 90+3'	Report	Antonio (yellow card) 37', (goal) 78'; Sakho 81', (yellow card) 90+1'; Ogbonna (yellow card) 80'; Payet 90'	Stadium: Goodison Park; Attendance: 39,000; Referee: Anthony Taylor

19 March 2016 29	Everton	0–2	Arsenal	Liverpool, Lancs.
13:45 GMT		Report	Welbeck 7'; Iwobi 42'	Stadium: Goodison Park; Attendance: 39,270; Referee: Mark Clattenburg

3 April 2016 30	Man Utd	1–0	Everton	Manchester, Lancs.
16:00 BST	Martial 54'; Smalling (yellow card) 61'; Lingard (yellow card) 90+2'	Report		Stadium: Old Trafford; Attendance: 75,341; Referee: Andre Marriner

9 April 2016 31	Watford	1–1	Everton	Watford, Herts.
15:00 BST	Capoue (yellow card) 13'; Holebas 45+2'; Ighalo (yellow card) 90+3'	Report	McCarthy (yellow card) 43', (goal) 45+1'	Stadium: Vicarage Road; Attendance: 20,663; Referee: Kevin Friend

13 April 2016 32	Crystal Palace	0–0	Everton	Selhurst
20:00 BST		Report	McCarthy (yellow card) 16' (yellow-red card) 52'; Barry (yellow card) 90+1'	Stadium: Selhurst Park; Attendance: 23,528; Referee: Mike Jones

16 April 2016 33	Everton	1–1	Southampton	Liverpool, Lancs.
15:00 BST	Gibson (yellow card) 42'; Funes Mori 68'	Report	Mané 76'; Rodriguez (yellow card) 84'	Stadium: Goodison Park; Attendance: 36,761; Referee: Craig Pawson

20 April 2016 34	Liverpool	4–0	Everton	Anfield, Liverpool
20:00 BST	Milner (yellow card) 8'; Origi 43'; Sakho 45+2'; Sturridge 61'; Coutinho 76'	Report	Lennon (yellow card) 42'; Funes Mori (red card) 50'	Stadium: Anfield; Attendance: 43,854; Referee: Robert Madley

30 April 2016 35	Everton	2–1	Bournemouth	Liverpool, Lancs.
20:00 BST	Cleverley 7'; Gibson (yellow card) 62'; Baines 64'	Report	Pugh 9'	Stadium: Goodison Park; Attendance: 38,345; Referee: Neil Swarbrick

7 May 2016 36	Leicester	3–1	Everton	Leicester, Leics.
17:30 BST	Vardy 5', 65' (pen.); King 33'	Report	Pennington (yellow card) 44'; Cleverley (yellow card) 49'; Gibson (yellow card) 71'; Mirallas 88'	Stadium: King Power Stadium; Attendance: 32,140; Referee: Andre Marriner

11 May 2016 37	Sunderland	3–0	Everton	Sunderland, Dur.
19:45 BST	Van Aanholt 38'; Koné 42', 55'	Report		Stadium: Stadium of Light; Attendance: 46,454; Referee: Anthony Taylor

15 May 2016 38	Everton	3–0	Norwich	Liverpool, Lancs.
15:00 BST	McCarthy 19'; Baines 44' (pen.); Mirallas 48'	Report		Stadium: Goodison Park; Attendance: 36,691; Referee: Lee Mason

=== FA Cup ===
Everton entered the FA Cup at the third round and were drawn at home to Dagenham & Redbridge. They defeated the Daggers 2–0 and were drawn away against Carlisle United in the fourth round. The tie at Brunton Park was the first held there since the ground had flooded in Storm Desmond and ended in a 3–0 win for Everton. In the fifth round, Everton were drawn away to AFC Bournemouth. They won 2–0 and followed that with another 2–0 win against Chelsea at Goodison Park. They advanced to the semi-final at Wembley Stadium where they lost to Manchester United.

9 January 2016 Third round	Everton	2–0	Dagenham & Redbridge	Liverpool, Lancs.
15:00 GMT	Koné 32'; Oviedo (yellow card) 34'; Mirallas 85' (pen.); Galloway (yellow card) 90+1'	Report	Hemmings (yellow card) 31'	Stadium: Goodison Park; Attendance: 30,918; Referee: Paul Tierney

31 January 2016 Fourth round	Carlisle	0–3	Everton	Carlisle, Cumb.
13:30 GMT	Kennedy (yellow card) 48'	Report	Koné 2'; Lennon 14'; McCarthy (yellow card) 44'; Barkley 65'	Stadium: Brunton Park; Attendance: 17,101; Referee: Lee Mason

20 February 2016 Fifth round	Bournemouth	0–2	Everton	Bournemouth
17:15 GMT	Gosling (yellow card) 45+1'; Iturbe (yellow card) 66'; King (yellow card) 68'	Report	McCarthy (yellow card) 18'; Barkley 55'; Lukaku 76'	Stadium: Dean Court; Attendance: 11,404; Referee: Martin Atkinson

12 March 2016 Quarter-final	Everton	2–0	Chelsea	Liverpool, Lancs.
17:30 GMT	Jagielka (yellow card) 42'; Lukaku 77', 82'; Barry (yellow card) 84' (red card) 87'	Report	Costa (yellow card) 11' (red card) 84'; Fàbregas (yellow card) 62'	Stadium: Goodison Park; Attendance: 37,283; Referee: Michael Oliver

23 April 2016 Semi-final	Everton	1–2	Man Utd	Wembley
17:15 BST	Smalling 75' (o.g.); Barkley (yellow card) 89'	Report	Fellaini 34'; Rooney (yellow card) 58'; Herrera (yellow card) 89'; Martial 90+3', (yellow card) 90+3'	Stadium: Wembley Stadium; Attendance: 86,064; Referee: Anthony Taylor

=== League Cup ===
As a Premier League team not involved in any UEFA competitions, Everton entered the League Cup at the second round stage. They defeated Barnsley away, after extra time, and were drawn away to Reading in the third round. The Toffees hosted fellow Premier League side Norwich City in the fourth round and won 4–3 on penalties. They beat Middlesbrough 2–0 away in the quarter-final, which was their first appearance at this stage since 2007–08. Everton lost to Manchester City 4–3 on aggregate in the two-legged semi-final.

26 August 2015 Second round	Barnsley	3–5 (a.e.t.)	Everton	Barnsley, Yorkshire
19:45 BST	Winnall 22'; Watkins 28'; Crowley 60'	Report	Mirallas 51'; Naismith 59'; Lukaku 78', 115'; Roberts 96' (o.g.)	Stadium: Oakwell; Referee: Simon Hooper

22 September 2015 Third round	Reading	1–2	Everton	Reading, Berks.
20:00 BST	Blackman 36'	Report	Barkley 62'; Deulofeu 73'	Stadium: Madejski Stadium; Referee: Keith Hill

27 October 2015 Fourth round	Everton	1–1 (a.e.t.) (4–3 p)	Norwich	Liverpool, Lancs.
19:45 GMT	Osman 68'	Report	Bassong 51'	Stadium: Goodison Park; Attendance: 31,694; Referee: Anthony Taylor
	Penalties
	(penalty scored) Deulofeu; (penalty scored) Barkley; (penalty scored) Lukaku; (penalty scored) Gibson		Dorrans (penalty scored); Whittaker (penalty scored); Hoolahan (penalty missed); Grabban (penalty scored); Redmond (penalty missed)

1 December 2015 Quarter-finals	Middlesbrough	0–2	Everton	Middlesbrough, Yorkshire
19:45 GMT		Report	Deulofeu 20'; Lukaku 28'	Stadium: Riverside Stadium; Attendance: 31,628

6 January 2016 Semi-finals (1)	Everton	2–1	Man City	Liverpool, Lancs.
20:00 GMT	Funes Mori 45'; Lukaku 78'	Report	Navas 76'	Stadium: Goodison Park; Attendance: 34,027; Referee: Robert Madley

27 January 2016 Semi-finals (2)	Man City	3–1 (4–3 agg.)	Everton	Manchester, Lancs.
19:45 GMT	Fernandinho 24'; De Bruyne 70'; Agüero 76'	Report	Barkley 18'	Stadium: City of Manchester Stadium; Attendance: 50,048; Referee: Martin Atkinson

== Statistics ==
=== Appearances ===
As of match played 15 May 2016.

No.	Pos	Nat	Player	Total		Premier League		FA Cup		League Cup	
No.	Pos	Nat	Player	Apps	Goals	Apps	Goals	Apps	Goals	Apps	Goals
1	GK	(Spain) ESP	Joel Robles	24	0	13	0	5	0	6	0
2	DF	(England) ENG	Tony Hibbert	1	0	0+1	0	0	0	0	0
3	DF	(England) ENG	Leighton Baines	22	2	16+2	2	1	0	2+1	0
4	MF	(Republic of Ireland) IRL	Darron Gibson	10	0	2+5	0	1+1	0	1	0
5	DF	(England) ENG	John Stones	40	0	31+2	0	0+1	0	6	0
6	DF	(England) ENG	Phil Jagielka	28	0	21	0	4	0	3	0
7	MF	(Republic of Ireland) IRL	Aiden McGeady	1	0	0	0	0	0	1	0
8	MF	(Costa Rica) CRC	Bryan Oviedo	19	0	12+2	0	3	0	2	0
9	FW	(Ivory Coast) CIV	Arouna Koné	31	7	16+9	5	2	2	2+2	0
10	FW	(Belgium) BEL	Romelu Lukaku	45	25	36+1	18	2	3	6	4
11	FW	(Belgium) BEL	Kevin Mirallas	29	6	10+13	4	1+1	1	2+2	1
12	MF	(England) ENG	Aaron Lennon	30	6	17+8	5	4	1	1	0
14	FW	(Scotland) SCO	Steven Naismith	13	4	4+6	3	0	0	1+2	1
14	FW	(Senegal) SEN	Oumar Niasse	7	0	2+3	0	0+2	0	0	0
15	MF	(England) ENG	Tom Cleverley	30	2	18+5	2	3	0	4	0
16	MF	(Republic of Ireland) IRL	James McCarthy	36	2	29	2	3	0	2+2	0
17	MF	(Bosnia and Herzegovina) BIH	Muhamed Bešić	16	0	7+5	0	1+1	0	2	0
18	MF	(England) ENG	Gareth Barry	39	0	32+1	0	2	0	3+1	0
19	FW	(Spain) ESP	Gerard Deulofeu	32	4	16+10	2	0	0	4+2	2
20	MF	(England) ENG	Ross Barkley	47	12	36+2	8	3	2	4+2	2
21	MF	(England) ENG	Leon Osman	16	1	2+7	0	0+2	0	4+1	1
22	MF	(South Africa) RSA	Steven Pienaar	6	0	0+4	0	2	0	0	0
23	DF	(Republic of Ireland) IRL	Séamus Coleman	34	1	27+1	1	3	0	2+1	0
24	GK	(United States) USA	Tim Howard	25	0	25	0	0	0	0	0
25	DF	(Argentina) ARG	Ramiro Funes Mori	37	5	24+4	4	4	0	5	1
27	DF	(England) ENG	Tyias Browning	6	0	3+2	0	0	0	1	0
28	FW	(Uruguay) URU	Leandro Rodríguez	1	0	0	0	0+1	0	0	0
29	DF	(England) ENG	Luke Garbutt	0	0	0	0	0	0	0	0
33	MF	(England) ENG	Callum Connolly	1	0	0+1	0	0	0	0	0
32	DF	(England) ENG	Brendan Galloway	19	0	14+1	0	1+1	0	1+1	0
38	DF	(England) ENG	Matthew Pennington	6	0	4	0	0+1	0	1	0
41	MF	(England) ENG	Tom Davies	2	0	1+1	0	0	0	0	0
43	DF	(England) ENG	Jonjoe Kenny	1	0	0+1	0	0	0	0	0
51	MF	(England) ENG	Kieran Dowell	2	0	1+1	0	0	0	0	0
