= Roberto Gamarra =

Roberto Gamarra may refer to:

- Roberto Gamarra (footballer, born 1981), Paraguayan football striker
- Roberto Gamarra (football manager) (born 1958), former Argentine and naturalised Paraguayan football midfielder
