= Sergio Velázquez (footballer, born 1990) =

Argentine footballer

Personal information
- Full name: Sergio Ezequiel Velázquez
- Date of birth: 12 September 1990 (age 36)
- Place of birth: Quilmes, Argentina
- Height: 1.71 m (5 ft 7 1/2 in)
- Position: Right back

Youth career
- Defensa y Justicia

Senior career*
Years	Team	Apps	(Gls)
2010–2014	Defensa y Justicia	62	(1)
2013	→ Universidad de Chile (loan)	8	(1)
2013–2014	→ Huracán (loan)	9	(0)
2014	Godoy Cruz	5	(0)
2014–2016	Gimnasia La Plata	4	(0)
2016–2018	Arsenal de Sarandí	33	(1)
2018–2019	Gimnasia de Mendoza	5	(0)
Total		126	(3)
- * Club domestic league appearances and goals

Sergio Ezequiel Velázquez (born 12 September 1990) is a former Argentine footballer who played as a right-back.

== Career ==
Velázquez's career began in 2010 with Primera B Nacional side Defensa y Justicia, he made his debut for the team on 19 September against Boca Unidos. Fifty appearances followed over the next three seasons for Velázquez. 2013 saw Velázquez leave on loan to join Chilean Primera División club Universidad de Chile, he played eight league matches and won the 2012–13 Copa Chile before returning to Argentina. Shortly after returning, he was loaned out to Huracán of Primera B Nacional. He made nine appearances during the 2013–14 Primera B Nacional season and won the 2013–14 Copa Argentina before going back to Defensa y Justicia and subsequently earning promotion after finishing second in the 2013–14 Primera B Nacional.

Velázquez left Defensa y Justicia permanently in the middle of 2014 as he agreed to join Argentine Primera División side Godoy Cruz, but his spell with Godoy Cruz was short as he departed six months later to join fellow Primera División club Gimnasia y Esgrima after just seven appearances. He was released by Gimnasia y Esgrima in January 2016 after only four appearances. He was without a club for the 2016 Argentine Primera División season before joining Arsenal de Sarandí ahead of the 2016–17 Argentine Primera División season.

== Career statistics ==
=== Club ===
As of 15 November 2016.

Club statistics
Club	Season	League			Cup (Note: Includes the Copa Argentina and Copa Chile.)		League Cup		Continental (Note: Includes the Copa Libertadores and Copa Sudamericana.)		Other		Total	
Club	Season	Division	Apps	Goals	Apps	Goals	Apps	Goals	Apps	Goals	Apps	Goals	Apps	Goals
Defensa y Justicia	2010–11	Primera B Nacional	18	0	0	0	—		—		0	0	18	0
Defensa y Justicia	2011–12	Primera B Nacional	17	0	1	0	—		—		0	0	18	0
Defensa y Justicia	2012–13	Primera B Nacional	16	1	1	0	—		—		0	0	17	1
Defensa y Justicia	2013–14	Primera B Nacional	11	0	0	0	—		—		0	0	11	0
Defensa y Justicia	Total		62	1	2	0	—		—		0	0	64	1
Universidad de Chile (loan)	2013	Chilean Primera División	8	1	2	0	—		4 (Note: Four appearances in 2013 Copa Libertadores.)	0	0	0	14	1
Huracán (loan)	2013–14	Primera B Nacional	9	0	0	0	—		—		0	0	9	0
Total			17	1	2	0	—		4	0	0	0	23	1
Godoy Cruz	2014	Argentine Primera División	5	0	0	0	—		2 (Note: Two appearances in 2014 Copa Sudamericana.)	0	0	0	7	0
Godoy Cruz	Total		5	0	0	0	—		2	0	0	0	7	0
Gimnasia y Esgrima	2015	Argentine Primera División	4	0	0	0	—		—		0	0	4	0
Gimnasia y Esgrima	Total		4	0	0	0	—		—		0	0	4	0
Arsenal de Sarandí	2016–17	Argentine Primera División	4	0	0	0	—		—		0	0	4	0
Arsenal de Sarandí	Total		4	0	0	0	—		—		0	0	4	0
Career total			92	2	4	0	—		6	0	0	0	102	2

== Honours ==
=== Club ===
Universidad de Chile

- Copa Chile (1): 2012–13

Huracán

- Copa Argentina (1): 2013–14
