= Gery Vargas =

Bolivian football referee

- Full name: Gery Anthony Vargas Carreño
- Born: 12 March 1981 (age 45); Oruro, Bolivia

Domestic
Years	League	Role
2008–	Bolivian Primera División	Referee

International
Years	League	Role
2012–	FIFA listed	Referee

Gery Anthony Vargas Carreño (born 12 March 1981) is a Bolivian football referee.

== Refereeing career ==
Vargas began officiating in the Bolivian Primera División in 2008, refereeing his first match on 17 August 2008 between Jorge Wilstermann and Guabirá. In 2012, Vargas became FIFA listed. Vargas made his club international debut in the Copa Sudamericana on 27 August 2014 in a first stage match between Chilean club Cobresal and Paraguayan club General Díaz.

On 11 June 2015, Vargas officiated his first senior international match, a friendly between Brazil and Honduras. He officiated his first competitive international on 17 November 2015, a World Cup qualification match between Venezuela and Ecuador.

Vargas made his refereeing debut in the Copa Libertadores on 18 February 2016, officiating a second stage match between Mexican club Deportivo Toluca and Brazilian club Grêmio. Later that year, Vargas was selected as an official for the Copa América Centenario, where he officiated a Group B match between Ecuador and Haiti on 12 June 2016.

In 2017, Vargas was selected as a referee for the 2017 FIFA U-17 World Cup in India, where he officiated three matches.

On 30 April 2018, Vargas was selected by FIFA as one of the video assistant referees for the 2018 FIFA World Cup in Russia, the first FIFA World Cup to use the technology. Vargas was appointed as the third assistant VAR in his first World Cup match between Argentina and Iceland in Group D.

Vargas was also selected for the 2021 Copa América in Brazil, but did not officiate any match.
