= Diego Macedo =

Brazilian footballer (born 1987)

Personal information
- Full name: Diego Macedo Prado dos Santos
- Date of birth: May 8, 1987 (age 39)
- Place of birth: Americana, Brazil
- Height: 1.73 m (5 ft 8 in)
- Position: Right wing back

Team information
- Current team: Santo André

Senior career*
Years	Team	Apps	(Gls)
2004	Rio Branco-SP		
2004–2005	Braga	4	(0)
2005–2006	Londrina	34	(4)
2007	→ União Barbarense (loan)		
2008	Rio Branco-PR		
2008	Ceilândia		
2008	Brasiliense		
2009	União Barbarense		
2009–2010	Bragantino	33	(4)
2010–2011	Atlético Mineiro	21	(0)
2011	Ceará	3	(0)
2011	Bragantino	12	(1)
2012	Linense	0	(0)
2012	Guaratinguetá	0	(0)
2012–2013	Bragantino	30	(5)
2013–2014	Corinthians	10	(0)
2015	Bahia	14	(0)
2016–2017	Hokkaido Consadole Sapporo	38	(0)
2018	Bragantino	0	(0)
2019–	Santo André	0	(0)
- * Club domestic league appearances and goals as of 3 April 2019

Diego Macedo Prado dos Santos (born 8 May 1987 in Americana, São Paulo) is a Brazilian footballer, who currently plays for Santo André.

== Career ==
Macedo left in summer 2009 his club União Agrícola Barbarense Futebol Clube to sign for Clube Atlético Bragantino. On 19 May 2010 Atletico Mineiro signed the right winger from Bragantino, the young player became a two years contract. However, the club terminated his contract after the 2010 season.

On 25 March 2011, he signed a one-year contract with Ceará.

== Club statistics ==
Updated to 23 February 2017.

Club performance			League		Cup		Total	
Season	Club	League	Apps	Goals	Apps	Goals	Apps	Goals
Japan			League		Emperor's Cup		Total	
2016	Hokkaido Consadole Sapporo	J2 League	23	0	1	0	24	0
Total			23	0	1	0	24	0
