= Henry Patta =

Ecuadorian footballer (born 1987)

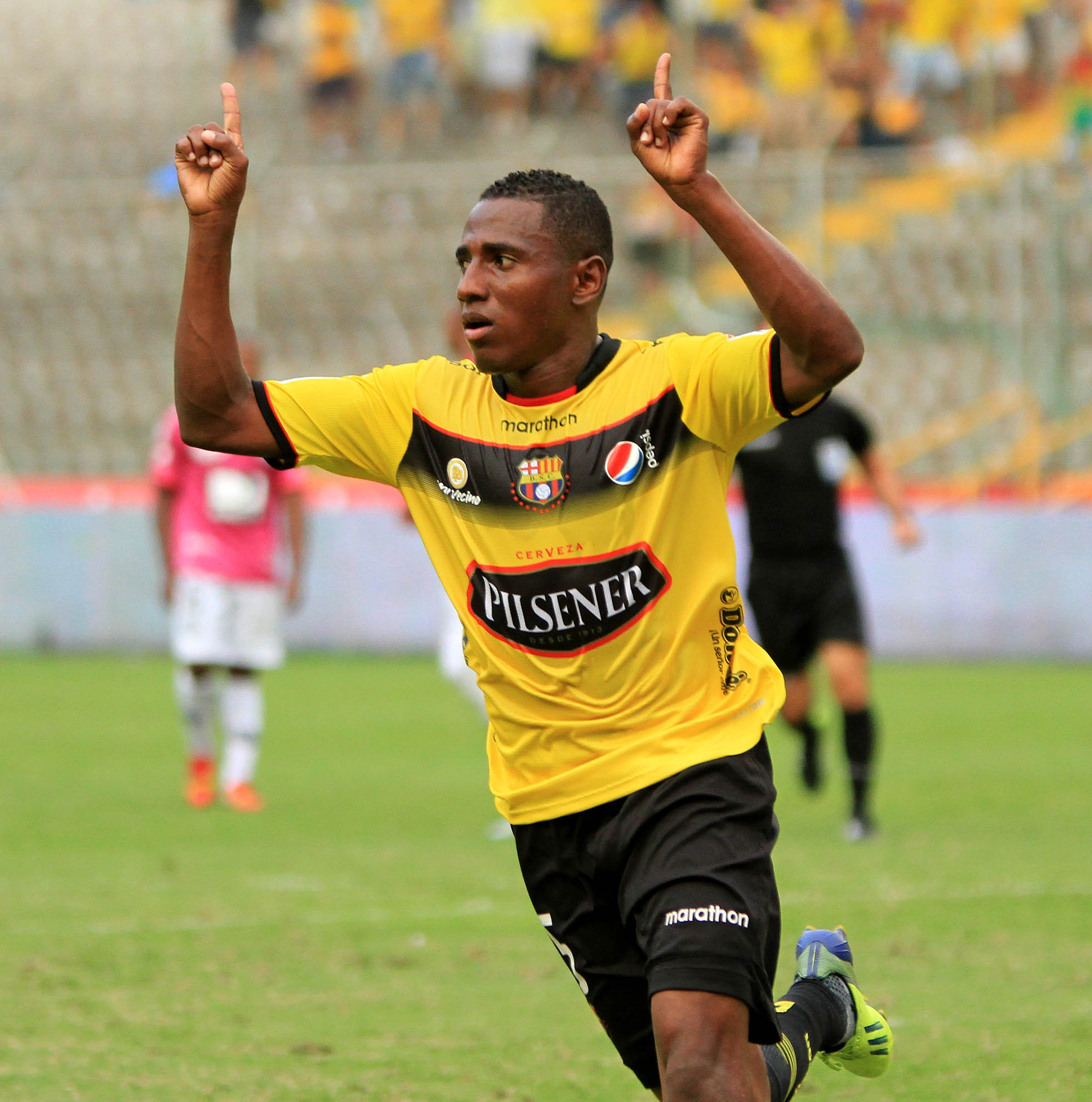
- Patta playing for Barcelona SC in 2015

Personal information
- Full name: Henry Leonel Patta Quintero
- Date of birth: 14 January 1987 (age 39)
- Place of birth: Quito, Ecuador
- Height: 1.65 m (5 ft 5 in)
- Position: Forward

Team information
- Current team: Gualaceo
- Number: 7

Senior career*
Years	Team	Apps	(Gls)
2004–2007	El Nacional		
2007–2008	Aucas	33	(9)
2008–2010	El Nacional	18	(1)
2010	Grecia	11	(0)
2011–2014	Universidad Católica	159	(48)
2015–2017	Barcelona SC	20	(1)
2016	→ Cobreloa (loan)	12	(0)
2016–2017	→ Mushuc Runa (loan)	21	(5)
2017–2019	Delfín	70	(5)
2019	Mushuc Runa	17	(1)
2020–2022	Técnico Universitario	55	(10)
- * Club domestic league appearances and goals as of 27 November 2021

Henry Leonel Patta Quintero (born 14 January 1987) is an Ecuadorian footballer who plays as a forward for Gualaceo.

== Career ==
Patta began his football career playing for the youth side of El Nacional. He played for Sociedad Deportiva Aucas in Ecuador's Serie B during 2007, when he was the club's second leading scorer, notching eight goals. Patta returned to El Nacional and began playing for the senior side in Ecuador's Serie A during 2008 and 2009. He was included in El Nacional's squad list for the 2009 Copa Libertadores.

== Personal life ==
Patta's brother, Elvis Patta, is also a professional footballer.

== Honours ==
Universidad Católica

- Serie B: 2012
