= Arlen Birch =

English footballer (born 1996)

Personal information
- Full name: Arlen Tom Birch
- Date of birth: 21 September 1996 (age 30)
- Place of birth: Wales
- Position: Defender

Youth career
- –2015: Everton
- 2015–2018: Burnley

Senior career*
Years	Team	Apps	(Gls)
2018–2019	AFC Fylde	26	(1)
2019–2020	AFC Telford United	19	(0)
2020–2021	Chorley	18	(0)
2021	AFC Telford United	10	(0)
- * Club domestic league appearances and goals

Arlen Tom Birch (born 21 September 1996) is a former footballer who played as a defender. Born in Wales, he was an England youth international.

== Early life ==
Birch was born in 1996 in Wales. He attended Lakelands Academy in England.

== Youth career ==
As a youth player, Birch joined the youth academy of English Premier League side Everton. He helped the club win the league.

== Senior club career ==
Birch started his career with English side AFC Fylde. He helped the club win the 2019 FA Trophy. In 2019, he signed for English side AFC Telford United. In 2020, he signed for English side Chorley. He was described as a "key player in Chorley's brilliant FA Cup run". In 2021, he signed for English side AFC Telford United.

== International career ==
Birch represented England internationally at youth level. He was first called up to the England national under-16 football team for a match against Spain.

== Style of play ==
Birch mainly operates as a defender. He has operated as a left-back and right-back.

== Personal life ==
Birch is the son of Alison Birch, Girlfriend Kim Schneider.
