= Roberto Gamarra (footballer, born 1981) =

Paraguayan footballer

Personal information
- Full name: Roberto Carlos Gamarra Acosta
- Date of birth: 11 May 1981 (age 45)
- Place of birth: Caazapá, Paraguay
- Height: 1.74 m (5 ft 9 in)
- Position: Forward

Youth career
- 1997–2000: 3 de Febrero

Senior career*
Years	Team	Apps	(Gls)
2000–2005	3 de Febrero	97	(34)
2004	→ Nacional (loan)	8	(1)
2005	Tacuary	11	(1)
2006–2010	Libertad	88	(25)
2009	→ Cúcuta Deportivo (loan)	30	(10)
2010	O'Higgins	11	(1)
2011	Deportes Tolima	11	(3)
2011	Nacional	13	(2)
2012	Sportivo Luqueño	15	(2)
2012	Rubio Ñu	13	(4)
2013–2014	Aurora	33	(9)
2014	General Díaz	19	(6)
2015	Guaraní	13	(5)
2015	Deportivo Santaní	18	(2)
2016–2017	Deportivo Capiatá	49	(20)
2017	3 de Febrero		
2018	Independiente FBC	7	(1)
2018	General Caballero ZC		
- * Club domestic league appearances and goals

Roberto Carlos Gamarra Acosta (born 11 May 1981) is a Paraguayan former professional footballer who played as a forward.

== Career ==
Gamarra began his playing career with 3 de Febrero. He won three league championships with Club Libertad.

=== Teams ===
- (Paraguay) 3 de Febrero 2000–2003
- (Paraguay) Nacional 2004
- (Paraguay) 3 de Febrero 2004–2005
- (Paraguay) Tacuary 2005
- (Paraguay) Libertad 2006–2008
- (Colombia) Cúcuta Deportivo 2009
- (Paraguay) Libertad 2010
- (Chile) O'Higgins 2010
- (Colombia) Deportes Tolima 2011
- (Paraguay) Nacional 2011
- (Paraguay) Sportivo Luqueño 2012
- (Paraguay) Rubio Ñu 2012
- (Bolivia) Aurora 2013–2014
- (Paraguay) General Díaz 2014
- (Paraguay) Guaraní 2015
- (Paraguay) Deportivo Santaní 2015
- (Paraguay) Deportivo Capiatá 2006–2017
- (Paraguay) 3 de Febrero 2017
- (Paraguay) Independiente FBC 2018
- (Paraguay) General Caballero ZC 2018

== Honours ==
Libertad

- Primera División Paraguaya (3): Clausura 2007, Apertura 2008, Clausura 2008
