= Germán Delfino =

Argentine football referee

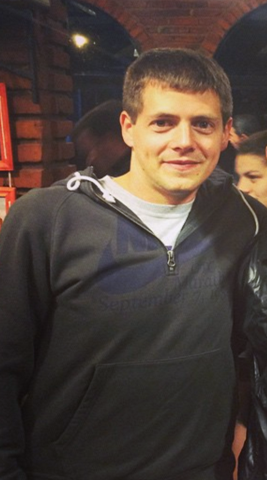
- Born: 4 May 1978 (age 48); Ramos Mejía, Buenos Aires, Argentina

Domestic
Years	League	Role
2010–	Argentine Primera División	Referee

International
Years	League	Role
2012–2019	FIFA listed	Referee
2021–	FIFA listed	Video match official

Germán Delfino (born 4 May 1978) is an Argentine football referee, who officiates primarily in the Argentine Primera División since 2010, as well as for FIFA as a FIFA international referee since 2012 until 2019.

As international referee, he had taken charge of matches in the Copa Libertadores and Copa Sudamericana, international friendly matches and 2018 FIFA World Cup qualifications.

== Refereeing career ==
In 2010 Delfino, was promoted to the Primera División referees crew, being his first game in the top tier of Argentinian football on 9 October 2010 when he took charge of a 1–1 draw between Huracán de Parque Patricios and All Boys. He is part of the Asociación Argentina de Árbitros (in English: Argentine Referees Association), where he lost the 2013 Union Elections.

After a successful 2012, in 2013, Delfino took part in the second leg of the Argentine most important match, the Superclásico. The first game, played on 3 May 2013, ended with a 1–1 draw at La Bombonera. The second one, played on October at the Monumental, ended with a 1–0 to Boca Juniors, who won after a goal scored by Gigliotti in the first half.

First international match

Delfino's first international game was at La Serena, Chile, in January 2013, when Chile hosted Senegal in a friendly match. It ended 2–1 to the Home team. During the match, he showed seven yellow cards, and two red ones (both for the African team).

=== International Superclásico games ===
In 2014, he took charge of one of the 2014 Copa Sudamericana Semi-finals, where Boca Juniors and River Plate disputed the second leg, won by River 1–0 (1–0 on the aggregate). One year later, Delfino officiated the 2015 Copa Libertadores Round of 16, between the two biggest teams of the country.

=== 2015 Recopa Sudamericana Final ===
He took charge of the 2015 Recopa Sudamericana Final first leg, between San Lorenzo and River, with a 1–0 favour to the second team, who won with a Sánchez goal. In the match, he sent off Leandro Romagnoli, from San Lorenzo, at 87'.
