= Claudio Vargas (footballer, born 1985) =

Paraguayan footballer

Personal information
- Full name: Claudio David Vargas Villalba
- Date of birth: 15 October 1985 (age 41)
- Place of birth: Asunción, Paraguay
- Height: 1.86 m (6 ft 1 in)
- Position: Defensive midfielder

Team information
- Current team: Guaraní (reserves manager)

Youth career
- 2000–2002: River Plate Asunción

Senior career*
Years	Team	Apps	(Gls)
2003	Sol de América		
2003–2004	Venezia		
2004	Cerro Porteño		
2005	Atlántida	20	(0)
2006–2009	Udinese	0	(0)
2007	→ Treviso (loan)	5	(0)
2008–2009	→ Sportivo Luqueño (loan)	49	(6)
2009	Olimpia	20	(2)
2010	Atlético Tucumán	23	(1)
2011	Sportivo Luqueño	15	(2)
2011	3 de Febrero	16	(4)
2012	Sportivo Luqueño	37	(7)
2013–2014	Libertad		
2015–2016	Olimpia		
2017	Sol de América		
2018	Sportivo Trinidense		
2018–2021	Independiente FBC		

Managerial career
- 2023–: Guaraní (reserves)
- 2024: Guaraní (interim)
- 2026: Guaraní (interim)
- * Club domestic league appearances and goals

Claudio David Vargas Villalba (born 15 October 1985) is a Paraguayan football manager and former player who played as a defensive midfielder. He is the current manager of Guaraní's reserve team.

== Career ==
He was on loan to Treviso in 2nd half of the 2006–07 season, and Luqueño in 2nd half of 2007–08 season. On 8 January 2010, Atlético Tucumán signed the Paraguayan midfielder from Club Olimpia. In 2011 he played for Luqueño and for 3 de Febrero. In 2012 he played for Luqueño.
