= Club Deportivo Capiatá =

Association football club in Paraguay

Deportivo Capiatá
- Full name: Club Deportivo Capiatá
- Nickname: Escoberos
- Founded: 4 September 2008; 18 years ago
- Ground: Estadio Lic. Erico Galeano Segovia
- Capacity: 10,000
- Chairman: Erico Galeano
- Coach: Julio Irrazábal
- League: División Intermedia
- 2025: División Intermedia, 3rd of 16
Home colours	Away colours	Third colours

Club Deportivo Capiatá is a Paraguayan football club based in the city of Capiatá. The club was founded on September 8, 2008 and plays in the División Intermedia, the second tier league of Paraguayan football. Their home games are played at the Estadio Lic. Erico Galeano Segovia.

== History ==
The club was founded on September 4, 2008; from the Capiateña Football League.

In 2010 play for the first time in Paraguayan División Intermedia.

In 2012 they finished in 2nd place, thus getting promoted to the Primera División for the first time in history.

In 2013 they made history again by qualifying to the 2014 Copa Sudamericana in their first year in the Primera División.

== Honours ==
- Paraguayan Segunda División:

Runner-up (1): 2012

- Interleague National Championship:

Runner-up (1): 2007-2008

== Current squad ==
As of 10 October 2019

Note: Flags indicate national team as defined under FIFA eligibility rules; some limited exceptions apply. Players may hold more than one non-FIFA nationality.

No.	Pos.	Nation	Player
1	GK	PAR	Bernardo Medina
2	DF	ARG	Diego Menghi
3	DF	PAR	Gustavo Noguera
5	DF	PAR	Néstor González
6	DF	PAR	Angel Martínez
7	FW	PAR	Santiago Salcedo
8	MF	PAR	Luis Cáceres
10	DF	ARG	Julio Irrazábal
12	GK	PAR	Victor Samudio
13	MF	PAR	Rolando Villagra
14	MF	PAR	Eduardo Aranda
15	MF	PAR	Cristian Sosa
16	DF	PAR	Sergio Vergara (on loan from Olimpia)
18	FW	PAR	Dionisio Pérez
19	FW	PAR	Edsson Riveros
20	DF	PAR	Cristhian Aguada
21	FW	PAR	Oliver Matessich
22	MF	PAR	Walter Rodríguez
23	MF	PAR	Ariel Coronel
24	DF	PAR	Jorge Paredes
25	DF	PAR	Kevin Agüero

No.	Pos.	Nation	Player
27	FW	PAR	Junior Marabel
28	MF	PAR	Fernando Bracho
29	MF	PAR	Osmar Molinas
31	FW	PAR	Maicol Fernández
34	MF	PAR	Juan Acosta
37	MF	PAR	Iván Saldívar
38	MF	PAR	Ramiro Bernal
40	FW	PAR	Fabio Escobar
—	FW	PAR	Cristian López
—	FW	PAR	Gustavo Caballero
—	MF	PAR	Roger Rojas
—	MF	PAR	Ronald Roa
—	MF	PAR	Kevin Pereira
—	MF	PAR	Saul Martínez
—	MF	PAR	Hugo López
—	MF	PAR	Miguel Barreto
—	DF	PAR	Isidro Saldívar
—	DF	PAR	Ariel Coronel
—	DF	PAR	José Carlos Báez
—	GK	PAR	Alcides Benítez

== Notable players ==
To appear in this section a player must have either:

- Been part of a national team at any time.
- Played in the first division of any other football association (outside of Paraguay).
- Played in a continental and/or intercontinental competition.

2000's

- Ninguno

2010's

- (Argentina) Carlos Zorrilla (2011–2012)
- (Paraguay) Julio Santa Cruz (2013, 2016–)
- (Bolivia) Diego Cabrera (2015–)
- (Argentina) Gabriel Santilli (2015–)
- (Argentina) Agustín Gil Clarotti (2016–)
- (Argentina) Rodrigo Soria (2016–)

Non-CONMEBOL players

- (Cameroon) Christ Mbondi (2016–)
