= Fabio Escobar =

Paraguayan footballer (born 1982)

Personal information
- Full name: Fabio Escobar Benítez
- Date of birth: 15 February 1982 (age 44)
- Place of birth: Asunción, Paraguay
- Height: 1.79 m (5 ft 10 in)
- Position: Forward

Senior career*
Years	Team	Apps	(Gls)
2002	Sportivo San Lorenzo	22	(1)
2003	Puerto Montt	31	(7)
2004	Nacional Asunción	27	(7)
2005	Toluca	12	(0)
2005	Mexiquense	4	(1)
2006	Nacional Asunción	16	(6)
2007	Macara	30	(5)
2008–2009	Nacional Asunción	59	(25)
2009–2010	Atlético Tucumán	25	(7)
2010	Argentinos Juniors	4	(0)
2011–2012	Guaraní	26	(4)
2013	Atlético Huila	6	(0)
2013–2015	Capiatá	67	(17)
2015–2016	Rubio Ñu	49	(28)
2017	Sportivo Trinidense	30	(4)
2018	Deportivo Santaní	19	(8)
2018	Sportivo Luqueño	18	(3)
2019	Deportivo Capiatá	8	(0)

International career
2004–2008	Paraguay	4	(0)
- * Club domestic league appearances and goals

Fabio Escobar Benítez (born 2 February 1982 in Asunción) is a Paraguayan retired football forward.

== Career ==
Escobar began his career in Sportivo San Lorenzo of Paraguay before playing for Puerto Montt of Chile, Club Toluca and Atlético Mexiquense of Mexico, Macara of Ecuador and Nacional Asunción of Paraguay. He was the top scorer in the 2008 Torneo Apertura.

In 2009, he joined Atlético Tucumán of Argentina, following their relegation from the Primera División he joined Argentinos Juniors in 2010.

Escobar competed as part of the Paraguay national football team in the 2004 Copa América.
