= Andrés Vilches =

Chilean footballer (born 1992)

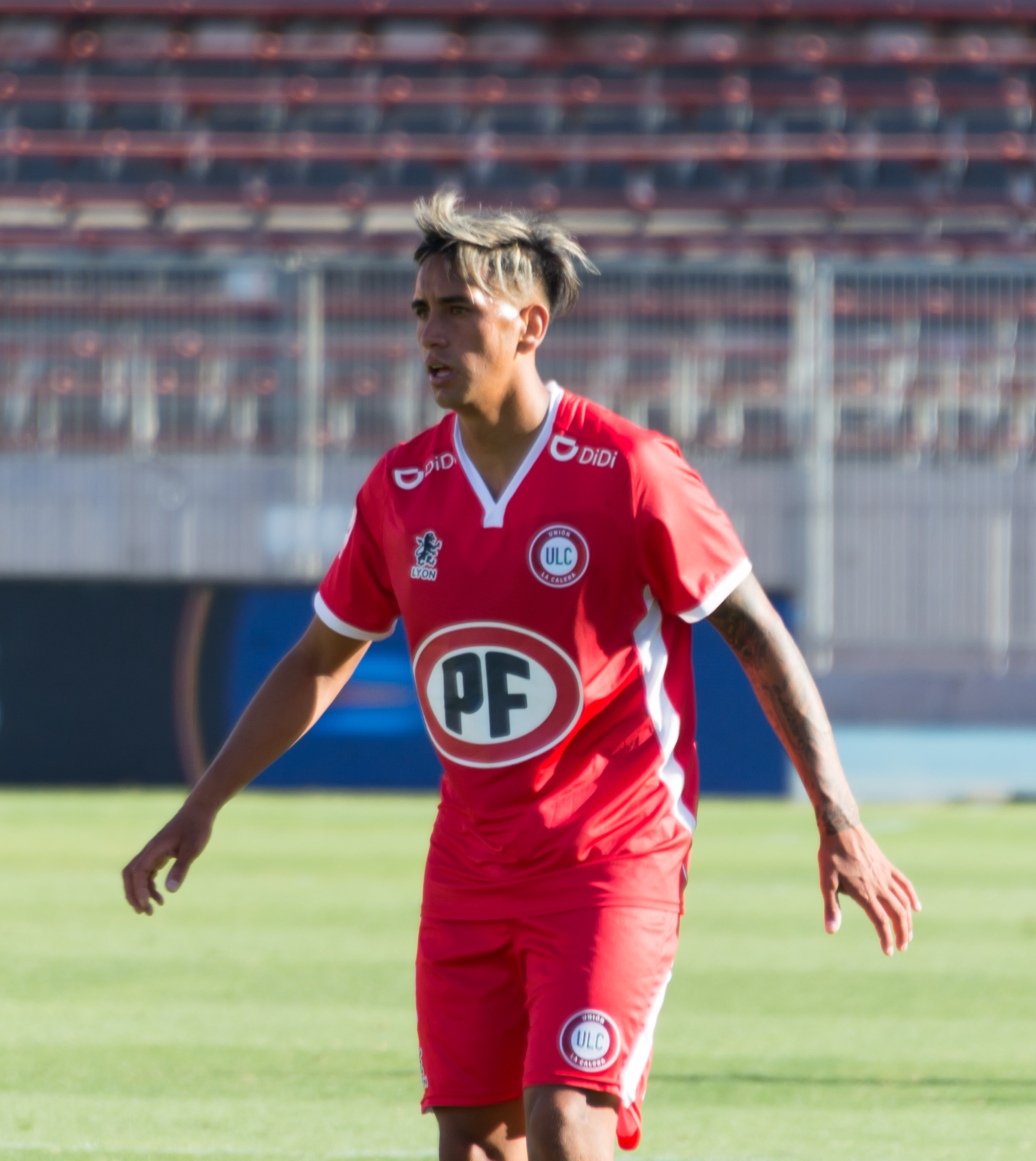
- Vilches with Unión La Calera in 2020

Personal information
- Full name: Andrés Alejandro Vilches Araneda
- Date of birth: 14 January 1992 (age 34)
- Place of birth: Talcahuano, Chile
- Height: 1.81 m (5 ft 11 1/2 in)
- Position: Forward

Team information
- Current team: Unión Española

Youth career
- 2000–2012: Huachipato

Senior career*
Years	Team	Apps	(Gls)
2010–2015	Huachipato	42	(19)
2013	→ Barnechea (loan)	6	(0)
2013–2014	→ Deportes Valdivia (loan)	21	(6)
2015–2019	Colo-Colo	56	(11)
2018	→ Universidad Católica (loan)	18	(2)
2020–2022	Unión La Calera	47	(19)
2022	→ Palestino (loan)	18	(1)
2023	Ñublense	21	(2)
2024	Santiago Wanderers	18	(2)
2024–2025	Cobresal	27	(5)
2026–	Unión Española	0	(0)

International career
2015–2020	Chile	2	(0)
- * Club domestic league appearances and goals as of 9 February 2026

Andrés Alejandro Vilches Araneda (born 14 January 1992) is a Chilean footballer who plays for as a forward for Unión Española.

== Club career ==
From 2015 to 2019, he played for Colo-Colo.

In 2023, he played for Ñublense in the Chilean top division. The next season, he switched to Santiago Wanderers.

In the second half of 2024, Vilches signed with Cobresal.

In February 2026, Vilches joined Unión Española in the Liga de Ascenso.

== International career ==
Vilches got his first call up to the senior Chile squad for a friendly against the United States in January 2015 and made his international debut in the match.

== Personal life ==
His older brother, Eduardo, is also a professional footballer.

Vilches is nicknamed Andy, an affective form of Andrés.

== Honours ==
Huachipato

- Primera División de Chile (1): 2012 Clausura

Colo-Colo

- Primera División (2): 2015–A, 2017–T
- Copa Chile (1): 2016
- Supercopa de Chile (1): 2017

Universidad Católica

- Primera División de Chile (1): 2018
