= Andy Pando =

Peruvian footballer (born 1983)

Personal information
- Full name: Andy Robert Pando García
- Date of birth: 28 July 1983 (age 43)
- Place of birth: Lima, Peru
- Height: 1.76 m (5 ft 9 in)
- Position: Forward

Youth career
- 1999-2001: Deportivo Zúñiga
- Sporting Cristal
- Unión de Campeones

Senior career*
Years	Team	Apps	(Gls)
2003–2006	Universidad San Marcos		(18)
2007	Alianza Atlético	9	(0)
2008–2009	Universidad San Marcos	24	(15)
2010	Colegio Nacional Iquitos	11	(7)
2010–2011	Sporting Cristal	27	(7)
2011	León de Huánuco	7	(0)
2012	Real Garcilaso	43	(27)
2013	Las Palmas	7	(0)
2013–2014	César Vallejo	53	(14)
2015	La Equidad	27	(6)
2016	Alianza Lima	25	(7)
2017–2018	César Vallejo	41	(28)
2019	Unión Huaral	5	(0)
2020	Deportivo Municipal	19	(2)
2021	Los Chankas	21	(12)
- * Club domestic league appearances and goals

Andy Robert Pando García (born 28 July 1983), commonly known as Andy Pando, is a Peruvian former professional footballer who played as a forward. His nicknamed is El Oso (English: The Bear)

== Career ==
Pando began his senior career in 2003 with Peruvian Segunda División side Universidad San Marcos He scored his first professional goal on 6 July 2003 in his club's win over América Cochahuayco in round 10 of that season, with Pando scoring the winning goal. He stayed with Universidad San Marcos until the end of the 2006 season, scoring a total of 18 goals in four seasons there.

Finally in January 2007 Pando would have his first spell in the Peruvian top-flight by joining Alianza Atlético. There he made his Torneo Descentralizado league debut on 14 February 2007 in a 0–0 draw at home against FBC Melgar.

In 2012 he played for Real Garcilaso and finished as the Torneo Descentralizado's top goalscorer with 27 goals. He was separated from the team before the second match in the final against Sporting Cristal. The club Garcilaso resolved his contract claiming he had a "lack of identification with the club".
