= Diego Abal =

Argentine football referee

- Full name: Diego Hernán Abal
- Born: 28 December 1971 (age 54)

Domestic
Years	League	Role

International
Years	League	Role
2008–	FIFA listed	Referee

Diego Hernán Abal (born 28 December 1971) is an Argentine football referee. He refereed at 2014 FIFA World Cup qualifiers.
