= Diego Vera =

Uruguayan footballer (born 1985)

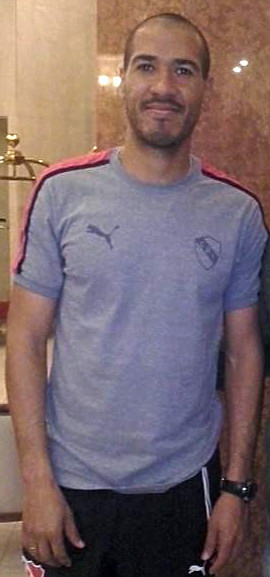
- Vera with Independiente in 2015

Personal information
- Full name: Diego Daniel Vera Méndez
- Date of birth: January 5, 1985 (age 41)
- Place of birth: Montevideo, Uruguay
- Height: 1.81 m (5 ft 11 in)
- Position: Striker

Team information
- Current team: Colón FC
- Number: 24

Youth career
- Bella Vista

Senior career*
Years	Team	Apps	(Gls)
2004–2007	Bella Vista	32	(14)
2007–2008	Nacional	31	(5)
2009	Defensor Sporting	12	(5)
2009–2010	Nacional	11	(2)
2010–2014	Liverpool Montevideo	29	(19)
2011	→ Nanchang Hengyuan (loan)	11	(3)
2011	→ Deportivo Pereira (loan)	15	(1)
2012	→ Querétaro (loan)	15	(2)
2013–2014	→ Atlético Rafaela (loan)	44	(17)
2014–2015	Estudiantes LP	23	(6)
2015–2017	Independiente	40	(13)
2017–2018	Colón	19	(3)
2018–2019	Tigre	14	(2)
2019–2021	Curicó Unido	36	(10)
2021	Defensor Sporting	24	(10)
2022	Racing Montevideo	24	(16)
2023	Danubio	27	(2)
2024–	Colón FC	5	(3)

International career
2006–2007	Uruguay	3	(0)
- * Club domestic league appearances and goals as of 27 April 2024

Diego Daniel Vera Méndez (Spanish pronunciation: [ˈdjeɣo ˈβeɾa]; (Note: In isolation, Vera is pronounced [ˈbeɾa].) born January 5, 1985) is a Uruguayan footballer who plays as a striker for Colón FC in the Uruguayan Segunda División.

== Career ==
Vera was born in Montevideo, and began his career playing with his hometown team Bella Vista. Later he played for several Uruguayan clubs such as Nacional, Defensor Sporting and Liverpool.

In January 2011, he was transferred to Chinese side Nanchang Hengyuan, where he scored 3 goals in 11 Chinese Super League appearances.

On 20 July 2011, he signed a new deal with Colombian side Deportivo Pereira. Unfortunately, his team was relegated to Categoría Primera B causing his return to Liverpool in early 2012.

On 30 June 2012, he signed for Mexican side Queretaro F.C.

On 16 July 2014, he signed for Estudiantes de La Plata.

In 2024, Vera joined Colón FC in the Uruguayan second division.

== Career statistics ==
As of match played on 20 February 2018

Appearances and goals by club, season and competition
Club	Season	League			Cup		Other		Total	
Club	Season	Division	Apps	Goals	Apps	Goals	Apps	Goals	Apps	Goals
Defensor Sporting	2009–10	Uruguayan Primera División	0	0	0	0	8 (Note: Appearances in Copa Libertadores)	1	8	1
Nacional	2009–10	Uruguayan Primera División	11	2	0	0	3	0	14	2
Liverpool	2010–11	Uruguayan Primera División	14	6	0	0	0	0	14	6
Shanghai Shenxin	2011	Chinese Super League	11	3	0	0	0	0	11	3
Deportivo Pereira	2011	Categoría Primera A	15	1	0	0	0	0	15	1
Liverpool	2011–12	Uruguayan Primera División	15	13	0	0	0	0	15	13
Querétaro	2012–13	Liga MX	15	2	2	0	0	0	17	2
Atlético Rafaela	2012–13	Argentine Primera División	13	4	1	1	0	0	14	5
Atlético Rafaela	2013–14	Argentine Primera División	31	13	0	0	0	0	31	13
Atlético Rafaela	Total		44	17	1	1	0	0	45	18
Estudiantes	2014	Argentine Primera División	16	4	2	1	6 (Note: Appearances in Copa Sudamericana)	3	24	8
Estudiantes	2015	Argentine Primera División	7	2	1	0	3	0	11	2
Estudiantes	Total		23	6	3	1	9	3	35	10
Independiente	2015	Argentine Primera División	14	7	2	1	6	0	22	8
Independiente	2016	Argentine Primera División	12	3	2	0	4	0	18	3
Independiente	2016–17	Argentine Primera División	14	3	0	0	3 (Note: Appearances in Torneos de Verano)	0	17	3
Independiente	Total		40	13	4	1	13	0	57	14
Colón	2016–17	Argentine Primera División	14	5	2	0	0	0	16	5
Colón	2017–18	Argentine Primera División	13	3	0	0	1	1	14	4
Colón	Total		27	8	2	0	1	1	30	9
Career totals			215	71	12	3	34	5	261	79

== Honours ==
Nacional

- Liguilla: 2007, 2008
