= Argentina national football team results (2000–2019) =

National football team results (2000–2019)

This page details the match results and statistics of the Argentina national football team from 2000 to 2019.

== Key ==
Key to matches

- (H) = Home ground
- (A) = Away ground
- (N) = Neutral ground
- Ref. = References

Key to record by opponent

- Pld = Matches played
- W = Matches won
- D = Matches drawn
- L = Matches lost
- GF = Goals for
- GA = Goals against
- GD = Goal difference
- WPCT = Win percentage

== Results ==
Argentina's score is shown first in each case.

No.	Date	Venue	Opponents	Score	Competition	Argentina scorers	Attendance	Ref.
735	23 February 2000	Wembley Stadium, London (A)	England	0–0	Friendly		74,008	
736	29 March 2000	Estadio Monumental, Buenos Aires (H)	Chile	4–1	2002 FIFA World Cup qualification	Batistuta, Verón (2), C. López	46,374	
737	26 April 2000	Estadio José Pachencho Romero, Maracaibo (A)	Venezuela	4–0	2002 FIFA World Cup qualification	Ayala, Ortega (2), Crespo	19,355	
738	4 June 2000	Estadio Monumental, Buenos Aires (H)	Bolivia	1–0	2002 FIFA World Cup qualification	G. López	50,669	
739	29 June 2000	Estadio El Campín, Bogotá (A)	Colombia	3–1	2002 FIFA World Cup qualification	Batistuta (2), Crespo	43,246	
740	19 July 2000	Estadio Monumental, Buenos Aires (H)	Ecuador	2–0	2002 FIFA World Cup qualification	Crespo, C. López	44,199	
741	26 July 2000	Estádio do Morumbi, São Paulo (A)	Brazil	1–3	2002 FIFA World Cup qualification	Almeyda	80,000	
742	16 August 2000	Estadio Monumental, Buenos Aires (H)	Paraguay	1–1	2002 FIFA World Cup qualification	Aimar	46,000	
743	3 September 2000	Estadio Nacional, Lima (A)	Peru	2–1	2002 FIFA World Cup qualification	Crespo, Verón	43,951	
744	8 October 2000	Estadio Monumental, Buenos Aires (H)	Uruguay	2–1	2002 FIFA World Cup qualification	Gallardo, Batistuta	48,762	
745	15 November 2000	Estadio Nacional, Santiago (A)	Chile	2–0	2002 FIFA World Cup qualification	Ortega, Husaín	56,529	
746	20 December 2000	Los Angeles Memorial Coliseum, Los Angeles (N)	Mexico	2–0	Copa Reebok	Solari, Galletti	42,000	
747	28 February 2001	Stadio Olimpico, Rome (A)	Italy	2–1	Friendly	K. González, Crespo	20,000	
748	28 March 2001	Estadio Monumental, Buenos Aires (H)	Venezuela	5–0	2002 FIFA World Cup qualification	Crespo, Sorín, Verón, Gallardo, Samuel	32,000	
749	25 April 2001	Estadio Hernando Siles, La Paz (A)	Bolivia	3–3	2002 FIFA World Cup qualification	Crespo (2), Sorín	35,000	
750	3 June 2001	Estadio Monumental, Buenos Aires (H)	Colombia	3–0	2002 FIFA World Cup qualification	K. González, C. López, Crespo	46,500	
751	15 August 2001	Atahualpa Olympic Stadium, Quito (A)	Ecuador	2–0	2002 FIFA World Cup qualification	Verón, Crespo	38,156	
752	5 September 2001	Estadio Monumental, Buenos Aires (H)	Brazil	2–1	2002 FIFA World Cup qualification	Gallardo, Cris (o.g.)	51,000	
753	7 October 2001	Estadio Defensores del Chaco, Asunción (A)	Paraguay	2–2	2002 FIFA World Cup qualification	Pochettino, Batistuta	45,000	
754	8 November 2001	Estadio Monumental, Buenos Aires (H)	Peru	2–0	2002 FIFA World Cup qualification	Samuel, C. López	18,901	
755	14 November 2001	Estadio Centenario, Montevideo (A)	Uruguay	1–1	2002 FIFA World Cup qualification	C. López	48,100	
756	13 February 2002	Millennium Stadium, Cardiff (A)	Wales	1–1	Friendly	Cruz	65,000	
757	27 March 2002	Charmilles Stadium, Geneva (N)	Cameroon	2–2	Friendly	Verón, Aimar	7,660	
758	17 April 2002	Neckarstadion, Stuttgart (A)	Germany	1–0	Friendly	Sorín	54,570	
759	2 June 2002	Kashima Soccer Stadium, Kashima (N)	Nigeria	1–0	2002 FIFA World Cup	Batistuta	34,050	
760	7 June 2002	Sapporo Dome, Sapporo (N)	England	0–1	2002 FIFA World Cup		32,957	
761	12 June 2002	Miyagi Stadium, Rifu (N)	Sweden	1–1	2002 FIFA World Cup	Crespo	45,777	
762	20 November 2002	Saitama Stadium, Midori-ku (A)	Japan	2–0	Friendly	Sorín, Crespo	40,931	
763	31 January 2003	Estadio Olímpico Metropolitano, San Pedro Sula (A)	Honduras	3–1	Friendly	Milito, L. González, M. González	20,000	
764	4 February 2003	Los Angeles Memorial Coliseum, Los Angeles (N)	Mexico	1–0	Friendly	G. Rodríguez	—	
765	8 February 2003	Miami Orange Bowl, Miami (A)	United States	1–0	Friendly	L. González	27,196	
766	12 February 2003	Amsterdam Arena, Amsterdam (A)	Netherlands	0–1	Friendly		40,090	
767	30 April 2003	Tripoli Stadium, Tripoli (A)	Libya	3–1	Friendly	Saviola, Riquelme, Aimar	25,000	
768	8 June 2003	Nagai Stadium, Osaka (A)	Japan	4–1	2003 Kirin Cup	Saviola, Zanetti, Romeo, M. Rodríguez	42,508	
769	11 June 2003	Seoul World Cup Stadium, Seoul (A)	South Korea	1–0	Friendly	Saviola	—	
770	16 July 2003	Estadio Ciudad de La Plata, La Plata (H)	Uruguay	2–2	Friendly	Milito (2)	35,000	
771	20 August 2003	Stadio Artemio Franchi, Florence (N)	Uruguay	3–2	Friendly	Verón, Samuel, D'Alessandro	8,000	
772	6 September 2003	Estadio Monumental, Buenos Aires (H)	Chile	2–2	2006 FIFA World Cup qualification	K. González, Aimar	35,372	
773	9 September 2003	Estadio Olímpico, Caracas (A)	Venezuela	3–0	2006 FIFA World Cup qualification	Aimar, Crespo, Delgado	24,783	
774	15 November 2003	Estadio Monumental, Buenos Aires (H)	Bolivia	3–0	2006 FIFA World Cup qualification	D'Alessandro, Crespo, Aimar	30,042	
775	19 November 2003	Estadio Metropolitano, Barranquilla (A)	Colombia	1–1	2006 FIFA World Cup qualification	Crespo	19,034	
776	30 March 2004	Estadio Monumental, Buenos Aires (H)	Ecuador	1–0	2006 FIFA World Cup qualification	Crespo	55,000	
777	28 April 2004	Stade Mohammed V, Casablanca (A)	Morocco	1–0	Friendly	K. González	60,000	
778	2 June 2004	Estádio Mineirão, Belo Horizonte (A)	Brazil	1–3	2006 FIFA World Cup qualification	Sorín	60,000	
779	6 June 2004	Estadio Monumental, Buenos Aires (H)	Paraguay	0–0	2006 FIFA World Cup qualification		37,000	
780	27 June 2004	Miami Orange Bowl, Miami (N)	Colombia	0–2	Friendly		—	
781	30 June 2004	Giants Stadium, East Rutherford (N)	Peru	2–1	Friendly	K. González, Saviola	—	
782	7 July 2004	Estadio Elías Aguirre, Chiclayo (N)	Ecuador	6–1	2004 Copa América	K. González, Saviola (3), L. González, D'Alessandro	24,000	
783	10 July 2004	Estadio Elías Aguirre, Chiclayo (N)	Mexico	0–1	2004 Copa América		25,000	
784	13 July 2004	Estadio Miguel Grau, Piura (N)	Uruguay	4–2	2004 Copa América	K. González, Figueroa (2), Ayala	24,000	
785	17 July 2004	Estadio Elías Aguirre, Chiclayo (A)	Peru	1–0	2004 Copa América	Tevez	25,000	
786	20 July 2004	Estadio Nacional, Lima (N)	Colombia	3–0	2004 Copa América	Tevez, L. González, Sorín	22,000	
787	25 July 2004	Estadio Nacional, Lima (N)	Brazil	2–2 (2–4 p)	2004 Copa América	K. González, Delgado	43,000	
788	18 August 2004	Shizuoka Stadium, Fukuroi (A)	Japan	2–1	Friendly	Galletti, Santana	45,000	
789	4 September 2004	Estadio Monumental, Lima (A)	Peru	3–1	2006 FIFA World Cup qualification	Rosales, Coloccini, Sorín	28,000	
790	9 October 2004	Estadio Monumental, Buenos Aires (H)	Uruguay	4–2	2006 FIFA World Cup qualification	L. González, Figueroa (2), Zanetti	50,000	
791	13 October 2004	Estadio Nacional, Santiago (A)	Chile	0–0	2006 FIFA World Cup qualification		57,671	
792	17 November 2004	Estadio Monumental, Buenos Aires (H)	Venezuela	3–2	2006 FIFA World Cup qualification	Rey (o.g.), Riquelme, Saviola	30,000	
793	9 February 2005	LTU Arena, Düsseldorf (A)	Germany	2–2	Friendly	Crespo (2)	51,500	
794	9 March 2005	Los Angeles Memorial Coliseum, Los Angeles (N)	Mexico	1–1	Friendly	Zárate	51,345	
795	26 March 2005	Estadio Hernando Siles, La Paz (A)	Bolivia	2–1	2006 FIFA World Cup qualification	Figueroa, Galletti	25,000	
796	30 March 2005	Estadio Monumental, Buenos Aires (H)	Colombia	1–0	2006 FIFA World Cup qualification	Crespo	40,000	
797	4 June 2005	Atahualpa Olympic Stadium, Quito (A)	Ecuador	0–2	2006 FIFA World Cup qualification		37,583	
798	8 June 2005	Estadio Monumental, Buenos Aires (H)	Brazil	3–1	2006 FIFA World Cup qualification	Crespo (2), Riquelme	49,497	
799	15 June 2005	RheinEnergieStadion, Cologne (N)	Tunisia	2–1	2005 FIFA Confederations Cup	Riquelme, Saviola	28,033	
800	18 June 2005	Frankenstadion, Nuremberg (N)	Australia	4–2	2005 FIFA Confederations Cup	Figueroa (3), Riquelme	25,618	
801	21 June 2005	Frankenstadion, Nuremberg (N)	Germany	2–2	2005 FIFA Confederations Cup	Riquelme, Cambiasso	42,088	
802	26 June 2005	Niedersachsenstadion, Hannover (N)	Mexico	1–1 (a.e.t.) (6–5 p)	2005 FIFA Confederations Cup	Figueroa	40,718	
803	29 June 2005	Waldstadion, Frankfurt (N)	Brazil	1–4	2005 FIFA Confederations Cup	Aimar	45,591	
804	17 August 2005	Ferenc Puskás Stadium, Budapest (A)	Hungary	2–1	Friendly	M. Rodríguez, Heinze	27,000	
805	3 September 2005	Estadio Defensores del Chaco, Asunción (A)	Paraguay	0–1	2006 FIFA World Cup qualification		32,000	
806	9 October 2005	Estadio Monumental, Buenos Aires (H)	Peru	2–0	2006 FIFA World Cup qualification	Riquelme, Guadalupe (o.g.)	36,977	
807	12 October 2005	Estadio Centenario, Montevideo (A)	Uruguay	0–1	2006 FIFA World Cup qualification		55,000	
808	12 November 2005	Stade de Genève, Geneva (N)	England	2–3	Friendly	Crespo, Samuel	29,000	
809	16 November 2005	Jassim bin Hamad Stadium, Doha (A)	Qatar	3–0	Friendly	Riquelme, Cruz, Ayala	—	
810	1 March 2006	St. Jakob-Park, Basel (N)	Croatia	2–3	Friendly	Tevez, Messi	13,138	
811	30 May 2006	Stadio Arechi, Salerno (N)	Angola	2–0	Friendly	M. Rodríguez, Sorín	—	
812	10 June 2006	Volksparkstadion, Hamburg (N)	Ivory Coast	2–1	2006 FIFA World Cup	Crespo, Saviola	49,480	
813	16 June 2006	Arena AufSchalke, Gelsenkirchen (N)	Serbia and Montenegro	6–0	2006 FIFA World Cup	M. Rodríguez (2), Cambiasso, Crespo, Tevez, Messi	52,000	
814	21 June 2006	Waldstadion, Frankfurt (N)	Netherlands	0–0	2006 FIFA World Cup		48,000	
815	24 June 2006	Zentralstadion, Leipzig (N)	Mexico	2–1 (a.e.t.)	2006 FIFA World Cup	Crespo, M. Rodríguez	43,000	
816	30 June 2006	Olympiastadion, Berlin (A)	Germany	1–1 (a.e.t.) (2–4 p)	2006 FIFA World Cup	Ayala	72,000	
817	3 September 2006	Emirates Stadium, London (N)	Brazil	0–3	Friendly		59,032	
818	11 October 2006	Estadio Nueva Condomina, Murcia (A)	Spain	1–2	Friendly	Bilos	31,000	
819	7 February 2007	Stade de France, Saint-Denis (A)	France	1–0	Friendly	Saviola	79,862	
820	18 April 2007	Estadio Malvinas Argentinas, Mendoza (H)	Chile	0–0	Friendly		60,000	
821	2 June 2007	St. Jakob-Park, Basel (A)	Switzerland	1–1	Friendly	Tevez	29,000	
822	5 June 2007	Camp Nou, Barcelona (N)	Algeria	4–3	Friendly	Tevez, Messi (2), Cambiasso	—	
823	28 June 2007	Estadio José Pachencho Romero, Maracaibo (N)	United States	4–1	2007 Copa América	Crespo (2), Aimar, Tevez	34,500	
824	2 July 2007	Estadio José Pachencho Romero, Maracaibo (N)	Colombia	4–2	2007 Copa América	Crespo, Riquelme (2), Milito	35,000	
825	5 July 2007	Estadio Metropolitano, Cabudare (N)	Paraguay	1–0	2007 Copa América	Mascherano	37,000	
826	8 July 2007	Estadio Metropolitano, Cabudare (N)	Peru	4–0	2007 Copa América	Riquelme (2), Messi, Mascherano	37,000	
827	11 July 2007	Polideportivo Cachamay, Ciudad Guayana (N)	Mexico	3–0	2007 Copa América	Heinze, Messi, Riquelme	40,000	
828	15 July 2007	Estadio José Pachencho Romero, Maracaibo (N)	Brazil	0–3	2007 Copa América		42,000	
829	22 August 2007	Ullevaal Stadion, Oslo (A)	Norway	1–2	Friendly	M. Rodríguez	23,932	
830	11 September 2007	Melbourne Cricket Ground, Melbourne (A)	Australia	1–0	Friendly	Demichelis	70,171	
831	13 October 2007	Estadio Monumental, Buenos Aires (H)	Chile	2–0	2010 FIFA World Cup qualification	Riquelme (2)	55,000	
832	16 October 2007	Estadio José Pachencho Romero, Maracaibo (A)	Venezuela	2–0	2010 FIFA World Cup qualification	Milito, Messi	10,600	
833	17 November 2007	Estadio Monumental, Buenos Aires (H)	Bolivia	3–0	2010 FIFA World Cup qualification	Agüero, Riquelme (2)	43,308	
834	20 November 2007	Estadio El Campín, Bogotá (A)	Colombia	1–2	2010 FIFA World Cup qualification	Messi	41,700	
835	7 February 2008	Los Angeles Memorial Coliseum, Los Angeles (N)	Guatemala	5–0	Friendly	Higuaín (2), Lavezzi, Maidana, Ruben	—	
836	26 March 2008	Cairo International Stadium, Cairo (A)	Egypt	2–0	Friendly	Agüero, Burdisso	—	
837	4 June 2008	San Diego Stadium, San Diego (N)	Mexico	4–1	Friendly	Burdisso, Messi, M. Rodríguez, Agüero	68,498	
838	8 June 2008	Giants Stadium, East Rutherford (A)	United States	0–0	Friendly		78,682	
839	15 June 2008	Estadio Monumental, Buenos Aires (H)	Ecuador	1–1	2010 FIFA World Cup qualification	Palacio	41,167	
840	18 June 2008	Estádio Mineirão, Belo Horizonte (A)	Brazil	0–0	2010 FIFA World Cup qualification		65,000	
841	20 August 2008	Dinamo Stadium, Minsk (A)	Belarus	0–0	Friendly		24,027	
842	6 September 2008	Estadio Monumental, Buenos Aires (H)	Paraguay	1–1	2010 FIFA World Cup qualification	Agüero	46,250	
843	10 September 2008	Estadio Monumental, Lima (A)	Peru	1–1	2010 FIFA World Cup qualification	Cambiasso	40,000	
844	11 October 2008	Estadio Monumental, Buenos Aires (H)	Uruguay	2–1	2010 FIFA World Cup qualification	Messi, Agüero	42,421	
845	15 October 2008	Estadio Nacional, Santiago (A)	Chile	0–1	2010 FIFA World Cup qualification		65,000	
846	19 November 2008	Hampden Park, Glasgow (A)	Scotland	1–0	Friendly	M. Rodríguez	32,492	
847	11 February 2009	Stade Vélodrome, Marseille (A)	France	2–0	Friendly	Gutiérrez, Messi	60,000	
848	28 March 2009	Estadio Monumental, Buenos Aires (H)	Venezuela	4–0	2010 FIFA World Cup qualification	Messi, Tevez, M. Rodríguez, Agüero	46,085	
849	1 April 2009	Estadio Hernando Siles, La Paz (A)	Bolivia	1–6	2010 FIFA World Cup qualification	L. González	30,487	
850	20 May 2009	Estadio Brigadier General Estanislao López, Santa Fe (H)	Panama	3–1	Friendly	Defederico, Bergessio (2)	25,000	
851	6 June 2009	Estadio Monumental, Buenos Aires (H)	Colombia	1–0	2010 FIFA World Cup qualification	Díaz	55,000	
852	10 June 2009	Atahualpa Olympic Stadium, Quito (A)	Ecuador	0–2	2010 FIFA World Cup qualification		36,359	
853	12 August 2009	Lokomotiv Stadium, Moscow (A)	Russia	3–2	Friendly	Agüero, L. López, Dátolo	28,000	
854	5 September 2009	Estadio Gigante de Arroyito, Rosario (H)	Brazil	1–3	2010 FIFA World Cup qualification	Dátolo	37,000	
855	9 September 2009	Estadio Defensores del Chaco, Asunción (A)	Paraguay	0–1	2010 FIFA World Cup qualification		38,000	
856	30 September 2009	Estadio Mario Alberto Kempes, Córdoba (H)	Ghana	2–0	Friendly	Palermo (2)	35,000	
857	10 October 2009	Estadio Monumental, Buenos Aires (H)	Peru	2–1	2010 FIFA World Cup qualification	Higuaín, Palermo	38,019	
858	14 October 2009	Estadio Centenario, Montevideo (A)	Uruguay	1–0	2010 FIFA World Cup qualification	Bolatti	60,000	
859	14 November 2009	Vicente Calderón Stadium, Madrid (A)	Spain	1–2	Friendly	Messi	54,000	
860	26 January 2010	Estadio Ingeniero Hilario Sánchez, San Juan (H)	Costa Rica	3–2	Friendly	Sosa, Burdisso, Jara	19,000	
861	10 February 2010	Estadio José María Minella, Mar del Plata (H)	Jamaica	2–1	Copa Loteria de la Provincia de Buenos Aires	Palermo, Canuto	—	
862	3 March 2010	Allianz Arena, Munich (A)	Germany	1–0	Friendly	Higuaín	65,152	
863	5 May 2010	El Coloso del Ruca Quimey, Cutral Có (H)	Haiti	4–0	Friendly	Bertoglio (2), Palermo, Blanco	16,500	
864	24 May 2010	Estadio Monumental, Buenos Aires (H)	Canada	5–0	Friendly	M. Rodríguez (2), Di María, Carlos Tevez, Agüero	52,000	
865	12 June 2010	Ellis Park Stadium, Johannesburg (N)	Nigeria	1–0	2010 FIFA World Cup	Heinze	55,686	
866	17 June 2010	Soccer City, Johannesburg (N)	South Korea	4–1	2010 FIFA World Cup	Park Chu-Young (o.g.), Higuaín (3)	82,174	
867	22 June 2010	Peter Mokaba Stadium, Polokwane (N)	Greece	2–0	2010 FIFA World Cup	Demichelis, Palermo	38,891	
868	27 June 2010	Soccer City, Johannesburg (N)	Mexico	3–1	2010 FIFA World Cup	Tevez (2), Higuaín	84,377	
869	3 July 2010	Cape Town Stadium, Cape Town (N)	Germany	0–4	2010 FIFA World Cup		64,100	
870	11 August 2010	Aviva Stadium, Dublin (A)	Republic of Ireland	1–0	Friendly	Di María	49,200	
871	7 September 2010	Estadio Monumental, Buenos Aires (H)	Spain	4–1	Friendly	Messi, Tevez, Higuaín, Agüero	53,000	
872	8 October 2010	NACK5 Stadium Omiya, Saitama (A)	Japan	0–1	Friendly		—	
873	17 November 2010	Khalifa International Stadium, Doha (N)	Brazil	1–0	Friendly	Messi	—	
874	9 February 2011	Stade de Genève, Geneva (N)	Portugal	2–1	Friendly	Di María, Messi	30,000	
875	16 March 2011	Estadio San Juan del Bicentenario, San Juan (H)	Venezuela	4–1	Friendly	Chávez, Mouche (2), Aued	25,000	
876	26 March 2011	New Meadowlands Stadium, East Rutherford (A)	United States	1–1	Friendly	Cambiasso	78,986	
877	29 March 2011	Estadio Nacional de Costa Rica, San José	Costa Rica	0–0	Friendly		35,000	
878	20 April 2011	Estadio José María Minella, Mar del Plata (H)	Ecuador	2–2	Friendly	Yacob, Hauche	—	
879	25 May 2011	Estadio Centenario, Resistencia (H)	Paraguay	4–2	Copa Chaco	Hauche (2), F. Fernández, Pérez	24,000	
880	1 June 2011	Abuja National Stadium, Abuja (A)	Nigeria	1–4 (Note: The match was refereed by Ibrahim Chaibou of Niger. FIFA conducted an investigation into several friendlies officiated by Chaibou in the late 2000s and early 2010s, concluding that he had received bribes to fix many of those matches, which included the Argentina–Nigeria game, another game between South Africa and Guatemala, and Bahrain versus a fake Togo team. As a result, FIFA banned him for life and imposed a heavy fine.)	Friendly	Boselli	—	
881	5 June 2011	Stadion Wojska Polskiego, Warsaw (A)	Poland	1–2	Friendly	Ruben	12,000	
882	20 June 2011	Estadio Monumental, Buenos Aires (H)	Albania	4–0	Friendly	Lavezzi, Messi, Agüero, Tevez	—	
883	1 July 2011	Estadio Ciudad de La Plata, La Plata (H)	Bolivia	1–1	2011 Copa América	Agüero	52,700	
884	6 July 2011	Estadio Brigadier General Estanislao López, Santa Fe (H)	Colombia	0–0	2011 Copa América		47,000	
885	11 July 2011	Estadio Mario Alberto Kempes, Córdoba (H)	Costa Rica	3–0	2011 Copa América	Agüero (2), Di María	57,000	
886	16 July 2011	Estadio Brigadier General Estanislao López, Santa Fe (H)	Uruguay	1–1 (a.e.t.) (4–5 p)	2011 Copa América	Higuaín	47,000	
887	2 September 2011	Salt Lake Stadium, Kolkata (N)	Venezuela	1–0	Friendly	Otamendi	75,000	
888	6 September 2011	Bangabandhu National Stadium, Dhaka (N)	Nigeria	3–1	Friendly	Higuaín, Di María, Echiéjilé (o.g.)	36,000	
889	14 September 2011	Estadio Mario Alberto Kempes, Córdoba (H)	Brazil	0–0	2011 Superclásico de las Américas		—	
890	28 September 2011	Estádio Olímpico do Pará, Belém (A)	Brazil	0–2	2011 Superclásico de las Américas		—	
891	7 October 2011	Estadio Monumental, Buenos Aires (H)	Chile	4–1	2014 FIFA World Cup qualification	Higuaín (3), Messi	26,161	
892	11 October 2011	Estadio José Antonio Anzoátegui, Puerto la Cruz (A)	Venezuela	0–1	2014 FIFA World Cup qualification		35,600	
893	11 November 2011	Estadio Monumental, Buenos Aires (H)	Bolivia	1–1	2014 FIFA World Cup qualification	Lavezzi	27,592	
894	15 November 2011	Estadio Metropolitano, Barranquilla (A)	Colombia	2–1	2014 FIFA World Cup qualification	Messi, Agüero	49,600	
895	29 February 2012	Stade de Suisse, Bern (A)	Switzerland	3–1	Friendly	Messi (3)	30,250	
896	2 June 2012	Estadio Monumental, Buenos Aires (H)	Ecuador	4–0	2014 FIFA World Cup qualification	Agüero, Higuaín, Messi, Di María	50,000	
897	9 June 2012	MetLife Stadium, East Rutherford (N)	Brazil	4–3	Friendly	Messi (3), F. Fernández	81,994	
898	15 August 2012	Waldstadion, Frankfurt (A)	Germany	3–1	Friendly	Khedira (o.g.), Messi, Di María	48,808	
899	7 September 2012	Estadio Mario Alberto Kempes, Córdoba (H)	Paraguay	3–1	2014 FIFA World Cup qualification	Di María, Higuaín, Messi	51,000	
900	11 September 2012	Estadio Nacional, Lima (A)	Peru	1–1	2014 FIFA World Cup qualification	Higuaín	54,721	
901	19 September 2012	Estádio Serra Dourada, Goiânia (A)	Brazil	1–2	2012 Superclásico de las Américas	J. M. Martínez	37,871	
902	12 October 2012	Estadio Malvinas Argentinas, Mendoza (H)	Uruguay	3–0	2014 FIFA World Cup qualification	Messi (2), Agüero	31,997	
903	16 October 2012	Estadio Nacional, Santiago (A)	Chile	2–1	2014 FIFA World Cup qualification	Messi, Higuaín	45,000	
904	14 November 2012	King Fahd International Stadium, Riyadh (A)	Saudi Arabia	0–0	Friendly		—	
905	21 November 2012	La Bombonera, Buenos Aires (H)	Brazil	2–1 (3–4 p)	2012 Superclásico de las Américas	Scocco (2)	32,000	
906	6 February 2013	Friends Arena, Stockholm (A)	Sweden	3–2	Friendly	Lustig (o.g.), Agüero, Higuaín	49,646	
907	22 March 2013	Estadio Monumental, Buenos Aires (H)	Venezuela	3–0	2014 FIFA World Cup qualification	Higuaín (2), Messi	40,000	
908	26 March 2013	Estadio Hernando Siles, La Paz (A)	Bolivia	1–1	2014 FIFA World Cup qualification	Banega	35,000	
909	7 June 2013	Estadio Monumental, Buenos Aires (H)	Colombia	0–0	2014 FIFA World Cup qualification		44,807	
910	11 June 2013	Atahualpa Olympic Stadium, Quito (A)	Ecuador	1–1	2014 FIFA World Cup qualification	Agüero	35,000	
911	14 June 2013	Estadio Doroteo Guamuch Flores, Guatemala City (A)	Guatemala	4–0	Friendly	Messi (3), A. Fernández	23,000	
912	14 August 2013	Stadio Olimpico, Rome (A)	Italy	2–1	Friendly	Higuaín, Banega	41,369	
913	10 September 2013	Estadio Defensores del Chaco, Asunción (A)	Paraguay	5–2	2014 FIFA World Cup qualification	Messi (2), Agüero, Di Maria, M. Rodríguez	27,000	
914	11 October 2013	Estadio Monumental, Buenos Aires (H)	Peru	3–1	2014 FIFA World Cup qualification	Lavezzi (2), Palacio	48,977	
915	15 October 2013	Estadio Centenario, Montevideo (A)	Uruguay	2–3	2014 FIFA World Cup qualification	M. Rodríguez (2)	55,000	
916	15 November 2013	MetLife Stadium, East Rutherford (N)	Ecuador	0–0	Friendly		49,165	
917	18 November 2013	Busch Stadium, St. Louis (N)	Bosnia and Herzegovina	2–0	Friendly	Agüero (2)	30,397	
918	5 March 2014	Arena Națională, Bucharest (A)	Romania	0–0	Friendly		53,000	
919	4 June 2014	Estadio Monumental, Buenos Aires (H)	Trinidad and Tobago	3–0	Friendly	Palacio, Mascherano, M. Rodríguez	40,000	
920	7 June 2014	Estadio Ciudad de La Plata, La Plata (H)	Slovenia	2–0	Friendly	Álvarez, Messi	53,000	
921	15 June 2014	Estádio do Maracanã, Rio de Janeiro (N)	Bosnia and Herzegovina	2–1	2014 FIFA World Cup	Kolašinac (o.g.), Messi	74,738	
922	21 June 2014	Estádio Mineirão, Belo Horizonte (N)	Iran	1–0	2014 FIFA World Cup	Messi	57,698	
923	25 June 2014	Estádio Beira-Rio, Porto Alegre (N)	Nigeria	3–2	2014 FIFA World Cup	Messi (2), Rojo	43,285	
924	1 July 2014	Arena Corinthians, São Paulo (N)	Switzerland	1–0 (a.e.t.)	2014 FIFA World Cup	Di María	63,255	
925	5 July 2014	Estádio Nacional Mané Garrincha, Brasília (N)	Belgium	1–0	2014 FIFA World Cup	Higuaín	68,551	
926	9 July 2014	Arena Corinthians, São Paulo (N)	Netherlands	0–0 (a.e.t.) (4–2 p)	2014 FIFA World Cup		63,267	
927	13 July 2014	Estádio do Maracanã, Rio de Janeiro (N)	Germany	0–1 (a.e.t.)	2014 FIFA World Cup		74,738	
928	3 September 2014	Esprit Arena, Düsseldorf (A)	Germany	4–2	Friendly	Agüero, Lamela, F. Fernández, Di María	51,132	
929	11 October 2014	Beijing National Stadium, Beijing (N)	Brazil	0–2	2014 Superclásico de las Américas		52,313	
930	14 October 2014	Hong Kong Stadium, Hong Kong (A)	Hong Kong	7–0	Friendly	Banega, Higuaín (2), Gaitán (2), Messi (2)	20,230	
931	12 November 2014	Boleyn Ground, London (N)	Croatia	2–1	Friendly	Ansaldi, Messi	19,834	
932	18 November 2014	Old Trafford, Manchester (N)	Portugal	0–1	Friendly		40,000	
933	28 March 2015	FedExField, Landover (N)	El Salvador	2–0	Friendly	Renderos (o.g.), Mancuello	53,968	
934	31 March 2015	MetLife Stadium, East Rutherford (N)	Ecuador	2–1	Friendly	Agüero, Pastore	48,000	
935	6 June 2015	Estadio San Juan del Bicentenario, San Juan (H)	Bolivia	5–0	Friendly	Di María (2), Agüero (3)	18,000	
936	13 June 2015	Estadio La Portada, La Serena (N)	Paraguay	2–2	2015 Copa América	Agüero, Messi	16,281	
937	16 June 2015	Estadio La Portada, La Serena (N)	Uruguay	1–0	2015 Copa América	Agüero	17,014	
938	20 June 2015	Estadio Sausalito, Viña del Mar (N)	Jamaica	1–0	2015 Copa América	Higuaín	21,083	
939	26 June 2015	Estadio Sausalito, Viña del Mar (N)	Colombia	0–0 (5–4 p)	2015 Copa América		21,508	
940	30 June 2015	Estadio Municipal, Concepción (N)	Paraguay	6–1	2015 Copa América	Rojo, Pastore, Di María (2), Agüero, Higuaín	29,205	
941	4 July 2015	Estadio Nacional, Santiago (A)	Chile	0–0 (a.e.t.) (1–4 p)	2015 Copa América		45,693	
942	4 September 2015	BBVA Stadium, Houston (N)	Bolivia	7–0	Friendly	Lavezzi (2), Agüero (2), Messi (2), Á. Correa	—	
943	8 September 2015	AT&T Stadium, Arlington (N)	Mexico	2–2	Friendly	Agüero, Messi	82,559	
944	8 October 2015	Estadio Monumental, Buenos Aires (H)	Ecuador	0–2	2018 FIFA World Cup qualification		40,000	
945	13 October 2015	Estadio Defensores del Chaco, Asunción (A)	Paraguay	0–0	2018 FIFA World Cup qualification		28,889	
946	13 November 2015	Estadio Monumental, Buenos Aires (H)	Brazil	1–1	2018 FIFA World Cup qualification	Lavezzi	53,000	
947	17 November 2015	Estadio Metropolitano, Barranquilla (A)	Colombia	1–0	2018 FIFA World Cup qualification	Biglia	46,000	
948	24 March 2016	Estadio Nacional, Santiago (A)	Chile	2–1	2018 FIFA World Cup qualification	Di María, Mercado	44,536	
949	29 March 2016	Estadio Mario Alberto Kempes, Córdoba (H)	Bolivia	2–0	2018 FIFA World Cup qualification	Mercado, Messi	53,000	
950	27 May 2016	Estadio San Juan del Bicentenario, San Juan (H)	Honduras	1–0	Friendly	Higuaín	—	
951	6 June 2016	Levi's Stadium, Santa Clara (N)	Chile	2–1	Copa América Centenario	Di María, Banega	69,451	
952	10 June 2016	Soldier Field, Chicago (N)	Panama	5–0	Copa América Centenario	Otamendi, Messi (3), Agüero	53,885	
953	14 June 2016	CenturyLink Field, Seattle (N)	Bolivia	3–0	Copa América Centenario	Lamela, Lavezzi, Cuesta	45,753	
954	18 June 2016	Gillette Stadium, Foxborough (N)	Venezuela	4–1	Copa América Centenario	Higuaín (2), Messi, Lamela	59,183	
955	21 June 2016	NRG Stadium, Houston (A)	United States	4–0	Copa América Centenario	Lavezzi, Messi, Higuaín (2)	70,858	
956	26 June 2016	MetLife Stadium, East Rutherford (N)	Chile	0–0 (a.e.t.) (2–4 p)	Copa América Centenario		82,026	
957	1 September 2016	Estadio Malvinas Argentinas, Mendoza (H)	Uruguay	1–0	2018 FIFA World Cup qualification	Messi	44,597	
958	6 September 2016	Estadio Metropolitano de Mérida, Mérida (A)	Venezuela	2–2	2018 FIFA World Cup qualification	Pratto, Otamendi	42,000	
959	6 October 2016	Estadio Nacional, Lima (A)	Peru	2–2	2018 FIFA World Cup qualification	Funes Mori, Higuaín	39,700	
960	11 October 2016	Estadio Mario Alberto Kempes, Córdoba (H)	Paraguay	0–1	2018 FIFA World Cup qualification		51,200	
961	10 November 2016	Estádio Mineirão, Belo Horizonte (A)	Brazil	0–3	2018 FIFA World Cup qualification		53,490	
962	15 November 2016	Estadio San Juan del Bicentenario, San Juan (H)	Colombia	3–0	2018 FIFA World Cup qualification	Messi, Pratto, Di María	24,000	
963	23 March 2017	Estadio Monumental, Buenos Aires (H)	Chile	1–0	2018 FIFA World Cup qualification	Messi	55,000	
964	28 March 2017	Estadio Hernando Siles, La Paz (A)	Bolivia	0–2	2018 FIFA World Cup qualification		29,943	
965	9 June 2017	Melbourne Cricket Ground, Melbourne (N)	Brazil	1–0	2017 Superclásico de las Américas	Mercado	95,969	
966	13 June 2017	National Stadium, Singapore (A)	Singapore	6–0	Friendly	Fazio, J. Correa, Gómez, Paredes, Alario, Di María	28,000	
967	31 August 2017	Estadio Centenario, Montevideo (A)	Uruguay	0–0	2018 FIFA World Cup qualification		55,000	
968	5 September 2017	Estadio Monumental, Buenos Aires (H)	Venezuela	1–1	2018 FIFA World Cup qualification	Feltscher (o.g.)	60,000	
969	5 October 2017	La Bombonera, Buenos Aires (H)	Peru	0–0	2018 FIFA World Cup qualification		47,960	
970	10 October 2017	Atahualpa Olympic Stadium, Quito (A)	Ecuador	3–1	2018 FIFA World Cup qualification	Messi (3)	29,000	
971	11 November 2017	Luzhniki Stadium, Moscow (A)	Russia	1–0	Friendly	Agüero	80,000	
972	14 November 2017	Krasnodar Stadium, Krasnodar (N)	Nigeria	2–4	Friendly	Banega, Agüero	22,739	
973	23 March 2018	City of Manchester Stadium, Manchester (N)	Italy	2–0	Friendly	Banega, Lanzini	—	
974	27 March 2018	Metropolitano Stadium, Madrid (A)	Spain	1–6	Friendly	Otamendi	65,541	
975	29 May 2018	La Bombonera, Buenos Aires (H)	Haiti	4–0	Friendly	Messi (3), Agüero	—	
976	16 June 2018	Otkritie Arena, Moscow (N)	Iceland	1–1	2018 FIFA World Cup	Agüero	44,190	
977	21 June 2018	Nizhny Novgorod Stadium, Nizhny Novgorod (N)	Croatia	0–3	2018 FIFA World Cup		43,319	
978	26 June 2018	Krestovsky Stadium, Saint Petersburg (N)	Nigeria	2–1	2018 FIFA World Cup	Messi, Rojo	64,468	
979	30 June 2018	Kazan Arena, Kazan (N)	France	3–4	2018 FIFA World Cup	Di María, Mercado, Agüero	42,873	
980	7 September 2018	Los Angeles Memorial Coliseum, Los Angeles (N)	Guatemala	3–0	Friendly	G. Martínez, Lo Celso, Simeone	22,000	
981	11 September 2018	MetLife Stadium, East Rutherford (N)	Colombia	0–0	Friendly		35,624	
982	11 October 2018	Prince Faisal bin Fahd Stadium, Riyadh (N)	Iraq	4–0	2018 Superclásico Championship	L. Martínez, Pereyra, Pezzella, Cervi	18,517	
983	16 October 2018	King Abdullah Sports City, Jeddah (N)	Brazil	0–1	2018 Superclásico Championship		65,000	
984	16 November 2018	Estadio Mario Alberto Kempes, Córdoba (H)	Mexico	2–0	Friendly	Funes Mori, Brizuela (o.g.)	—	
985	20 November 2018	Estadio Malvinas Argentinas, Mendoza (H)	Mexico	2–0	Friendly	Icardi, Dybala	35,000	
986	22 March 2019	Metropolitano Stadium, Madrid (N)	Venezuela	1–3	Friendly	L. Martínez	20,000	
987	26 March 2019	Stade Ibn Batouta, Tangier (A)	Morocco	1–0	Friendly	Á. Correa	35,000	
988	7 June 2019	Estadio San Juan del Bicentenario, San Juan (H)	Nicaragua	5–1	Friendly	Messi (2), L. Martínez (2), Pereyra	—	
989	15 June 2019	Arena Fonte Nova, Salvador (N)	Colombia	0–2	2019 Copa América		35,572	
990	19 June 2019	Estádio Mineirão, Belo Horizonte (N)	Paraguay	1–1	2019 Copa América	Messi	35,265	
991	23 June 2019	Arena do Grêmio, Porto Alegre (N)	Qatar	2–0	2019 Copa América	L. Martínez, Agüero	41,390	
992	28 June 2019	Estádio do Maracanã, Rio de Janeiro (N)	Venezuela	2–0	2019 Copa América	L. Martínez, Lo Celso	50,094	
993	2 July 2019	Estádio Mineirão, Belo Horizonte (A)	Brazil	0–2	2019 Copa América		55,947	
994	6 July 2019	Arena Corinthians, São Paulo (N)	Chile	2–1	2019 Copa América	Agüero, Dybala	44,269	
995	5 September 2019	Los Angeles Memorial Coliseum, Los Angeles (N)	Chile	0–0	Friendly		—	
996	10 September 2019	Alamodome, San Antonio (N)	Mexico	4–0	Friendly	L. Martínez (3), Paredes	—	
997	9 October 2019	Westfalenstadion, Dortmund (A)	Germany	2–2	Friendly	Alario, Ocampos	45,197	
998	13 October 2019	Martínez Valero, Elche (N)	Ecuador	6–1	Friendly	Alario, Espinoza (o.g.), Paredes, Pezzella, Domínguez, Ocampos	—	
999	15 November 2019	King Saud University Stadium, Riyadh (N)	Brazil	1–0	2019 Superclásico de las Américas	Messi	22,541	
1,000	18 November 2019	Bloomfield Stadium, Tel Aviv (N)	Uruguay	2–2	Friendly	Agüero, Messi	—	

Notes

1. A: Originally scheduled as a full international, Argentina fielded an under-23 team as a warm-up for the Beijing 2008 Olympics. The match is considered a full international by FIFA.
2. B: 3–3 on aggregate. Brazil won on penalties.
3. C: The Brazil–Argentina match at the 2018 Superclásico Championship doubled as the 2018 Superclásico de las Américas.

== Record by opponent ==
Team	Pld	W	D	L	GF	GA	GD	WPCT
Albania	1	1	0	0	4	0	+4	100.00
Algeria	1	1	0	0	4	3	+1	100.00
Angola	1	1	0	0	2	0	+2	100.00
Australia	2	2	0	0	5	2	+3	100.00
Belarus	1	0	1	0	0	0	0	0.00
Belgium	1	1	0	0	1	0	+1	100.00
Bolivia	14	8	4	2	33	15	+18	57.14
Bosnia and Herzegovina	2	2	0	0	4	1	+3	100.00
Brazil	23	7	4	12	22	40	−18	30.43
Cameroon	1	0	1	0	2	2	0	0.00
Canada	1	1	0	0	5	0	+5	100.00
Chile	16	9	6	1	23	9	+14	56.25
Colombia	17	9	5	3	23	11	+12	52.94
Costa Rica	3	2	1	0	6	2	+4	66.67
Croatia	3	1	0	2	4	7	−3	33.33
Ecuador	15	8	4	3	30	14	+16	53.33
Egypt	1	1	0	0	2	0	+2	100.00
El Salvador	1	1	0	0	2	0	+2	100.00
England	3	0	1	2	2	4	−2	0.00
France	3	2	0	1	6	4	+2	66.67
Germany	10	4	4	2	16	15	+1	40.00
Ghana	1	1	0	0	2	0	+2	100.00
Greece	1	1	0	0	2	0	+2	100.00
Guatemala	3	3	0	0	12	0	+12	100.00
Haiti	2	2	0	0	8	0	+8	100.00
Honduras	2	2	0	0	4	1	+3	100.00
Hong Kong	1	1	0	0	7	0	+7	100.00
Hungary	1	1	0	0	2	1	+1	100.00
Iceland	1	0	1	0	1	1	0	0.00
Iran	1	1	0	0	1	0	+1	100.00
Iraq	1	1	0	0	4	0	+4	100.00
Italy	3	3	0	0	6	2	+4	100.00
Ivory Coast	1	1	0	0	2	1	+1	100.00
Jamaica	2	2	0	0	3	1	+2	100.00
Japan	4	3	0	1	8	3	+5	75.00
Libya	1	1	0	0	3	1	+2	100.00
Mexico	13	9	3	1	27	8	+19	69.23
Morocco	2	2	0	0	2	0	+2	100.00
Netherlands	3	0	2	1	0	1	−1	0.00
Nicaragua	1	1	0	0	5	1	+4	100.00
Nigeria	7	5	0	2	13	12	+1	71.43
Norway	1	0	0	1	1	2	−1	0.00
Panama	2	2	0	0	8	1	+7	100.00
Paraguay	15	5	7	3	26	26	0	33.33
Peru	13	9	4	0	25	9	+16	69.23
Poland	1	0	0	1	1	2	−1	0.00
Portugal	2	1	0	1	2	2	0	50.00
Qatar	2	2	0	0	5	0	+5	100.00
Republic of Ireland	1	1	0	0	1	0	+1	100.00
Romania	1	0	1	0	0	0	0	0.00
Russia	2	2	0	0	4	2	+2	100.00
Saudi Arabia	1	0	1	0	0	0	0	0.00
Scotland	1	1	0	0	1	0	+1	100.00
Serbia and Montenegro	1	1	0	0	6	0	+6	100.00
Singapore	1	1	0	0	6	0	+6	100.00
Slovenia	1	1	0	0	2	0	+2	100.00
South Korea	2	2	0	0	5	1	+4	100.00
Spain	4	1	0	3	7	11	−4	25.00
Sweden	2	1	1	0	4	3	+1	50.00
Switzerland	3	2	1	0	5	2	+3	66.67
Trinidad and Tobago	1	1	0	0	3	0	+3	100.00
Tunisia	1	1	0	0	2	1	+1	100.00
United States	5	3	2	0	10	2	+8	60.00
Uruguay	16	9	5	2	29	18	+11	56.25
Venezuela	15	11	2	2	41	11	+30	73.33
Wales	1	0	1	0	0	0	0	0.00
Total	266	158	62	46	502	255	+247	59.40

Source: Results
