= Brazil national football team results (2010–present) =

This page details the match results and statistics of the Brazil national football team from 2010 to present.

== Key ==
Key to matches

- Att.=Match attendance
- (H)=Home ground
- (A)=Away ground
- (N)=Neutral ground

Key to record by opponent

- Pld=Games played
- W=Games won
- D=Games drawn
- L=Games lost
- GF=Goals for
- GA=Goals against

== Results ==
Brazil's score is shown first in each case.

No.	Date	Venue	Opponents	Score	Competition	Brazil scorers	Att.	Ref.
846	2 March 2010	Emirates Stadium, London (N)	Republic of Ireland	2–0	Friendly	Andrews (o.g.), Robinho	40,082	
847	2 June 2010	National Sports Stadium, Harare (A)	Zimbabwe	3–0	Friendly	Michel Bastos, Robinho, Elano	30,000	
848	7 June 2010	National Stadium, Dar es Salaam (A)	Tanzania	5–1	Friendly	Robinho (2), Ramires (2), Kaká	35,000	
849	15 June 2010	Ellis Park Stadium, Johannesburg (N)	North Korea	2–1	2010 FIFA World Cup	Maicon, Elano	54,331	
850	20 June 2010	Soccer City, Johannesburg (N)	Ivory Coast	3–1	2010 FIFA World Cup	Luís Fabiano (2), Elano	84,455	
851	25 June 2010	Moses Mabhida Stadium, Durban (N)	Portugal	0–0	2010 FIFA World Cup		62,712	
852	28 June 2010	Ellis Park Stadium, Johannesburg (N)	Chile	3–0	2010 FIFA World Cup	Juan, Luís Fabiano, Robinho	54,096	
853	2 July 2010	Nelson Mandela Bay Stadium, Port Elizabeth (N)	Netherlands	1–2	2010 FIFA World Cup	Robinho	40,186	
854	10 August 2010	New Meadowlands Stadium, East Rutherford (A)	United States	2–0	Friendly	Neymar, Pato	77,233	
855	7 October 2010	Zayed Sports City Stadium, Abu Dhabi (N)	Iran	3–0	Friendly	Alves, Pato, Nilmar	—	
856	11 October 2010	Pride Park Stadium, Derby (N)	Ukraine	2–0	Friendly	Alves, Pato	13,088	
857	17 November 2010	Khalifa International Stadium, Doha (N)	Argentina	0–1	Friendly		—	
858	9 February 2011	Stade de France, Saint-Denis (A)	France	0–1	Friendly		79,712	
859	27 March 2011	Emirates Stadium, London (N)	Scotland	2–0	Friendly	Neymar (2)	53,087	
860	4 June 2011	Estádio Serra Dourada, Goiânia (H)	Netherlands	0–0	Friendly		—	
861	7 June 2011	Pacaembu Stadium, São Paulo (H)	Romania	1–0	Friendly	Fred	30,059	
862	3 July 2011	Estadio Ciudad de La Plata, La Plata (N)	Venezuela	0–0	2011 Copa América		35,000	
863	9 July 2011	Estadio Mario Alberto Kempes, Córdoba (N)	Paraguay	2–2	2011 Copa América	Jádson, Fred	57,000	
864	13 July 2011	Estadio Mario Alberto Kempes, Córdoba (N)	Ecuador	4–2	2011 Copa América	Pato (2), Neymar (2)	39,000	
865	17 July 2011	Estadio Ciudad de La Plata, La Plata (N)	Paraguay	0–0 (a.e.t.) (0–2p)	2011 Copa América		36,000	
866	10 August 2011	Mercedes-Benz Arena, Stuttgart (A)	Germany	2–3	Friendly	Robinho, Neymar	54,767	
867	5 September 2011	Craven Cottage, London (N)	Ghana	1–0	Friendly	Leandro Damião	—	
868	14 September 2011	Estadio Mario Alberto Kempes, Córdoba (A)	Argentina	0–0	2011 Superclásico de las Américas		—	
869	28 September 2011	Mangueirão, Belém (H)	Argentina	2–0	2011 Superclásico de las Américas	Lucas Moura, Neymar	—	
870	7 October 2011	Estadio Nacional, San José (A)	Costa Rica	1–0	Friendly	Neymar	28,000	
871	11 October 2011	Estadio Corona, Torreón (A)	Mexico	2–1	Friendly	Ronaldinho, Marcelo	30,000	
872	10 November 2011	Stade d'Angondjé, Libreville (A)	Gabon	2–0	Friendly	Sandro, Hernanes	—	
873	14 November 2011	Al-Rayyan Stadium, Doha (N)	Egypt	2–0	Friendly	Jonas (2)	—	
874	28 February 2012	AFG Arena, St. Gallen (N)	Bosnia and Herzegovina	2–1	Friendly	Marcelo, Papac (o.g.)	—	
875	26 May 2012	Volksparkstadion, Hamburg (N)	Denmark	3–1	Friendly	Hulk (2), Zimling (o.g.)	—	
876	30 May 2012	FedExField, Landover, Maryland (A)	United States	4–1	Friendly	Neymar, Thiago Silva, Marcelo, Pato	67,619	
877	3 June 2012	Cowboys Stadium, Arlington, (N)	Mexico	0–2	Friendly		84,519	
878	9 June 2012	MetLife Stadium, East Rutherford (N)	Argentina	3–4	Friendly	Rômulo, Oscar, Hulk	81,994	
879	15 August 2012	Råsunda Stadium, Solna (A)	Sweden	3–0	Friendly	Leandro Damião, Pato (2)	32,781	
880	7 September 2012	Estádio do Morumbi, São Paulo (H)	South Africa	1–0	Friendly	Hulk	51,500	
881	10 September 2012	Estádio do Arruda, Recife (H)	China	8–0	Friendly	Ramires, Neymar (3), Lucas Moura, Hulk, Liu (o.g.), Oscar	29,658	
882	19 September 2012	Estádio Serra Dourada, Goiânia (H)	Argentina	2–1	2012 Superclásico de las Américas	Paulinho, Neymar	37,871	
883	11 October 2012	Stadion, Malmö (N)	Iraq	6–0	Friendly	Oscar (2), Kaká, Hulk, Neymar, Lucas Moura	14,147	
884	16 October 2012	Stadion Wrocław, Wrocław (N)	Japan	4–0	Friendly	Paulinho, Neymar (2), Kaká	36,000	
885	14 November 2012	MetLife Stadium, East Rutherford (N)	Colombia	1–1	Friendly	Neymar	38,624	
886	21 November 2012	La Bombonera, Buenos Aires (A)	Argentina	1–2 (4–3p)	2012 Superclásico de las Américas	Fred	32,000	
887	6 February 2013	Wembley Stadium, London (A)	England	1–2	Friendly	Fred	87,453	
888	21 March 2013	Stade de Genève, Geneva (N)	Italy	2–2	Friendly	Fred, Oscar	29,700	
889	25 March 2013	Stamford Bridge, London (N)	Russia	1–1	Friendly	Fred	35,206	
890	6 April 2013	Estadio Ramón Tahuichi Aguilera, Santa Cruz de la Sierra (A)	Bolivia	4–0	Friendly	Leandro Damião, Neymar (2), Leandro	35,000	
891	24 April 2013	Mineirão, Belo Horizonte (H)	Chile	2–2	Friendly	Réver, Neymar	53,331	
892	2 June 2013	Maracanã Stadium, Rio de Janeiro (H)	England	2–2	Friendly	Fred, Paulinho	66,015	
893	9 June 2013	Arena do Grêmio, Porto Alegre (H)	France	3–0	Friendly	Oscar, Hernanes, Lucas Moura	51,643	
894	15 June 2013	Estádio Nacional Mané Garrincha, Brasília (N)	Japan	3–0	2013 FIFA Confederations Cup	Neymar, Paulinho, Jô	67,423	
895	19 June 2013	Castelão, Fortaleza (N)	Mexico	2–0	2013 FIFA Confederations Cup	Neymar, Jô	50,791	
896	22 June 2013	Itaipava Arena Fonte Nova, Salvador (N)	Italy	4–2	2013 FIFA Confederations Cup	Dante, Neymar, Fred (2)	48,874	
897	26 June 2013	Mineirão, Belo Horizonte (N)	Uruguay	2–1	2013 FIFA Confederations Cup	Fred, Paulinho	57,483	
898	30 June 2013	Maracanã Stadium, Rio de Janeiro (N)	Spain	3–0	2013 FIFA Confederations Cup	Fred (2), Neymar	73,531	
899	14 August 2013	St. Jakob-Park, Basel (A)	Switzerland	0–1	Friendly		31,100	
900	7 September 2013	Estádio Nacional Mané Garrincha, Brasília (H)	Australia	6–0	Friendly	Jô (2), Neymar, Ramires, Pato, Luiz Gustavo	40,996	
901	10 September 2013	Gillette Stadium, Foxborough (N)	Portugal	3–1	Friendly	Thiago Silva, Neymar, Jô	62,310	
902	12 October 2013	Seoul World Cup Stadium, Seoul (A)	South Korea	2–0	Friendly	Neymar, Oscar	65,308	
903	15 October 2013	Beijing National Stadium, Beijing (N)	Zambia	2–0	Friendly	Oscar, Dedé	—	
904	16 November 2013	Sun Life Stadium, Miami Gardens (N)	Honduras	5–0	Friendly	Bernard, Dante, Maicon, Willian, Hulk	71,124	
905	19 November 2013	Rogers Centre, Toronto (N)	Chile	2–1	Friendly	Hulk, Robinho	30,000	
906	5 March 2014	Soccer City, Johannesburg (A)	South Africa	5–0	Friendly	Oscar, Neymar (3), Fernandinho	67,616	
907	3 June 2014	Estádio Serra Dourada, Goiânia (H)	Panama	4–0	Friendly	Neymar, Hulk, Dani Alves, Willian	31,871	
908	6 June 2014	Estádio do Morumbi, São Paulo (H)	Serbia	1–0	Friendly	Fred	67,042	
909	12 June 2014	Arena Corinthians, São Paulo (N)	Croatia	3–1	2014 FIFA World Cup	Neymar (2), Oscar	62,103	
910	17 June 2014	Castelão, Fortaleza (N)	Mexico	0–0	2014 FIFA World Cup		60,342	
911	23 June 2014	Estádio Nacional Mané Garrincha, Brasília (N)	Cameroon	4–1	2014 FIFA World Cup	Neymar (2), Fred, Fernandinho	69,112	
912	28 June 2014	Mineirão, Belo Horizonte (N)	Chile	1–1 (a.e.t.) (3–2p)	2014 FIFA World Cup	David Luiz	57,714	
913	4 July 2014	Castelão, Fortaleza (N)	Colombia	2–1	2014 FIFA World Cup	Thiago Silva, David Luiz	60,341	
914	8 July 2014	Mineirão, Belo Horizonte (N)	Germany	1–7	2014 FIFA World Cup	Oscar	58,141	
915	12 July 2014	Estádio Nacional Mané Garrincha, Brasília (N)	Netherlands	0–3	2014 FIFA World Cup		68,034	
916	5 September 2014	Sun Life Stadium, Miami Gardens (N)	Colombia	1–0	Friendly	Neymar	73,479	
917	9 September 2014	MetLife Stadium, East Rutherford (N)	Ecuador	1–0	Friendly	Willian	35,975	
918	11 October 2014	Beijing National Stadium, Beijing (N)	Argentina	2–0	2014 Superclásico de las Américas	Tardelli (2)	52,313	
919	14 October 2014	National Stadium, Singapore (N)	Japan	4–0	Friendly	Neymar (4)	51,577	
920	12 November 2014	Şükrü Saracoğlu Stadium, Istanbul (A)	Turkey	4–0	Friendly	Neymar (2), Kaya (o.g.), Willian	—	
921	18 November 2014	Ernst-Happel-Stadion, Vienna (A)	Austria	2–1	Friendly	David Luiz, Firmino	48,500	
922	26 March 2015	Stade de France, Saint-Denis (A)	France	3–1	Friendly	Oscar, Neymar, Luiz Gustavo	80,000	
923	29 March 2015	Emirates Stadium, London (N)	Chile	1–0	Friendly	Firmino	60,007	
924	7 June 2015	Allianz Parque, São Paulo (H)	Mexico	2–0	Friendly	Coutinho, Tardelli	34,659	
925	10 June 2015	Estádio Beira-Rio, Porto Alegre (H)	Honduras	1–0	Friendly	Firmino	—	
926	14 June 2015	Estadio Municipal Germán Becker, Temuco (N)	Peru	2–1	2015 Copa América	Neymar, Douglas Costa	16,342	
927	17 June 2015	Estadio Monumental, Santiago (N)	Colombia	0–1	2015 Copa América		44,008	
928	21 June 2015	Estadio Monumental, Santiago (N)	Venezuela	2–1	2015 Copa América	Thiago Silva, Firmino	33,284	
929	27 June 2015	Estadio Ester Roa, Concepción (N)	Paraguay	1–1 (3–4p)	2015 Copa América	Robinho	29,276	
930	5 September 2015	Red Bull Arena, Harrison (N)	Costa Rica	1–0	Friendly	Hulk	19,600	
931	8 September 2015	Gillette Stadium, Foxborough (A)	United States	4–1	Friendly	Hulk, Neymar (2), Rafinha	29,308	
932	8 October 2015	Estadio Nacional, Santiago (A)	Chile	0–2	2018 FIFA World Cup qualification		42,000	
933	13 October 2015	Castelão, Fortaleza (H)	Venezuela	3–1	2018 FIFA World Cup qualification	Willian (2), Ricardo Oliveira	48,970	
934	13 November 2015	Estadio Monumental, Buenos Aires (A)	Argentina	1–1	2018 FIFA World Cup qualification	Lucas Lima	53,000	
935	17 November 2015	Itaipava Arena Fonte Nova, Salvador (H)	Peru	3–0	2018 FIFA World Cup qualification	Douglas Costa, Renato Augusto, Filipe Luís	45,000	
936	25 March 2016	Arena Pernambuco, São Lourenço da Mata (H)	Uruguay	2–2	2018 FIFA World Cup qualification	Douglas Costa, Renato Augusto	45,010	
937	29 March 2016	Estadio Defensores del Chaco, Asunción (A)	Paraguay	2–2	2018 FIFA World Cup qualification	Ricardo Oliveira, Dani Alves	34,457	
938	29 May 2016	Dick's Sporting Goods Park, Commerce City (N)	Panama	2–0	Friendly	Jonas, Gabriel Barbosa	—	
939	4 June 2016	Rose Bowl, Pasadena (N)	Ecuador	0–0	Copa América Centenario		53,158	
940	8 June 2016	Citrus Bowl, Orlando (N)	Haiti	7–1	Copa América Centenario	Coutinho (3), Renato Augusto (2), Gabriel Barbosa, Lucas Lima	28,241	
941	12 June 2016	Gillette Stadium, Foxborough (N)	Peru	0–1	Copa América Centenario		36,187	
942	1 September 2016	Atahualpa Olympic Stadium, Quito (A)	Ecuador	3–0	2018 FIFA World Cup qualification	Neymar, Jesus (2)	37,887	
943	6 September 2016	Arena da Amazônia, Manaus (H)	Colombia	2–1	2018 FIFA World Cup qualification	Miranda, Neymar	36,609	
944	6 October 2016	Arena das Dunas, Natal (H)	Bolivia	5–0	2018 FIFA World Cup qualification	Neymar, Coutinho, Filipe Luís, Jesus, Firmino	40,013	
945	11 October 2016	Estadio Metropolitano, Mérida (A)	Venezuela	2–0	2018 FIFA World Cup qualification	Jesus, Willian	42,700	
946	10 November 2016	Mineirão, Belo Horizonte (H)	Argentina	3–0	2018 FIFA World Cup qualification	Coutinho, Neymar, Paulinho	53,490	
947	15 November 2016	Estadio Nacional, Lima (A)	Peru	2–0	2018 FIFA World Cup qualification	Jesus, Renato Augusto	38,700	
948	25 January 2017	Estádio Olímpico Nilton Santos, Rio de Janeiro (H)	Colombia	1–0	Fundraiser Friendly	Dudu	—	
949	23 March 2017	Estadio Centenario, Montevideo (A)	Uruguay	4–1	2018 FIFA World Cup qualification	Paulinho (3), Neymar	55,676	
950	28 March 2017	Arena Corinthians, São Paulo (H)	Paraguay	3–0	2018 FIFA World Cup qualification	Coutinho, Neymar, Marcelo	45,000	
951	9 June 2017	Melbourne Cricket Ground, Melbourne (N)	Argentina	0–1	2017 Superclásico de las Américas		95,969	
952	13 June 2017	Melbourne Cricket Ground, Melbourne (A)	Australia	4–0	Friendly	Diego Souza (2), Thiago Silva, Taison	49,874	
953	31 August 2017	Arena do Grêmio, Porto Alegre (H)	Ecuador	2–0	2018 FIFA World Cup qualification	Paulinho, Coutinho	38,000	
954	5 September 2017	Estadio Metropolitano, Barranquilla (A)	Colombia	1–1	2018 FIFA World Cup qualification	Willian	46,500	
955	5 October 2017	Estadio Hernando Siles, La Paz (A)	Bolivia	0–0	2018 FIFA World Cup qualification		34,725	
956	10 October 2017	Allianz Parque, São Paulo (H)	Chile	3–0	2018 FIFA World Cup qualification	Paulinho, Jesus (2)	46,008	
957	10 November 2017	Stade Pierre-Mauroy, Villeneuve-d'Ascq (N)	Japan	3–1	Friendly	Neymar, Marcelo, Jesus	16,922	
958	14 November 2017	Wembley Stadium, London (A)	England	0–0	Friendly		84,595	
959	23 March 2018	Luzhniki Stadium, Moscow (A)	Russia	3–0	Friendly	Miranda, Coutinho, Paulinho	59,263	
960	27 March 2018	Olympiastadion, Berlin (A)	Germany	1–0	Friendly	Jesus	72,717	
961	3 June 2018	Anfield, Liverpool (N)	Croatia	2–0	Friendly	Neymar, Firmino	54,000	
962	10 June 2018	Ernst-Happel-Stadion, Vienna (A)	Austria	3–0	Friendly	Jesus, Neymar, Coutinho	—	
963	17 June 2018	Rostov Arena, Rostov-on-Don (N)	Switzerland	1–1	2018 FIFA World Cup	Coutinho	43,109	
964	22 June 2018	Krestovsky Stadium, Saint Petersburg (N)	Costa Rica	2–0	2018 FIFA World Cup	Coutinho, Neymar	64,468	
965	27 June 2018	Otkritie Arena, Moscow (N)	Serbia	2–0	2018 FIFA World Cup	Paulinho, Thiago Silva	44,190	
966	2 July 2018	Samara Arena, Samara (N)	Mexico	2–0	2018 FIFA World Cup	Neymar, Firmino	41,970	
967	6 July 2018	Kazan Arena, Kazan (N)	Belgium	1–2	2018 FIFA World Cup	Renato Augusto	42,873	
968	7 September 2018	MetLife Stadium, East Rutherford (A)	United States	2–0	Friendly	Firmino, Neymar	32,489	
969	11 September 2018	FedExField, Landover, Maryland (A)	El Salvador	5–0	Friendly	Neymar, Richarlison (2), Coutinho, Marquinhos	28,511	
970	12 October 2018	King Saud University Stadium, Riyadh (A)	Saudi Arabia	2–0	2018 Superclásico Championship	Jesus, Alex Sandro	23,401	
971	16 October 2018	King Abdullah Sports City, Jeddah (N)	Argentina	1–0	2018 Superclásico Championship	Miranda	65,000	
972	16 November 2018	Emirates Stadium, London (N)	Uruguay	1–0	Friendly	Neymar	—	
973	20 November 2018	Stadium MK, Milton Keynes (N)	Cameroon	1–0	Friendly	Richarlison	20,712	
974	23 March 2019	Estádio do Dragão, Porto (N)	Panama	1–1	Friendly	Paquetá	39,410	
975	26 March 2019	Sinobo Stadium, Prague (A)	Czech Republic	3–1	Friendly	Firmino, Jesus (2)	19,116	
976	5 June 2019	Estádio Nacional Mané Garrincha, Brasília (H)	Qatar	2–0	Friendly	Richarlison, Jesus	34,204	
977	9 June 2019	Estádio Beira-Rio, Porto Alegre (H)	Honduras	7–0	Friendly	Jesus (2), Thiago Silva, Coutinho, Neres, Firmino, Richarlison	—	
978	14 June 2019	Estádio do Morumbi, São Paulo (N)	Bolivia	3–0	2019 Copa América	Coutinho (2), Everton	47,260	
979	18 June 2019	Itaipava Arena Fonte Nova, Salvador (N)	Venezuela	0–0	2019 Copa América		42,587	
980	22 June 2019	Arena Corinthians, São Paulo (N)	Peru	5–0	2019 Copa América	Casemiro, Firmino, Everton, Dani Alves, Willian	42,317	
981	27 June 2019	Arena do Grêmio, Porto Alegre (N)	Paraguay	0–0 (4–3p)	2019 Copa América		44,902	
982	2 July 2019	Mineirão, Belo Horizonte (N)	Argentina	2–0	2019 Copa América	Jesus, Firmino	55,947	
983	7 July 2019	Maracanã Stadium, Rio de Janeiro (N)	Peru	3–1	2019 Copa América	Everton, Jesus, Richarlison	69,968	
984	6 September 2019	Hard Rock Stadium, Miami Gardens (N)	Colombia	2–2	Friendly	Casemiro, Neymar	—	
985	10 September 2019	Los Angeles Memorial Coliseum, Los Angeles (N)	Peru	0–1	Friendly		32,287	
986	10 October 2019	National Stadium, Singapore (N)	Senegal	1–1	Friendly	Firmino	—	
987	13 October 2019	National Stadium, Singapore (N)	Nigeria	1–1	Friendly	Casemiro	—	
988	15 November 2019	King Saud University Stadium, Riyadh (N)	Argentina	0–1	2019 Superclásico de las Américas		22,541	
989	19 November 2019	Zayed Sports City Stadium, Abu Dhabi (N)	South Korea	3–0	Friendly	Paquetá, Coutinho, Danilo	10,175	
990	9 October 2020	Arena Corinthians, São Paulo (H)	Bolivia	5–0	2022 FIFA World Cup qualification	Marquinhos, Firmino (2), Carrasco (o.g.), Coutinho	0	
991	13 October 2020	Estadio Nacional, Lima (A)	Peru	4–2	2022 FIFA World Cup qualification	Neymar (3), Richarlison	0	
992	13 November 2020	Estádio do Morumbi, São Paulo (H)	Venezuela	1–0	2022 FIFA World Cup qualification	Firmino	0	
993	17 November 2020	Estadio Centenario, Montevideo (A)	Uruguay	2–0	2022 FIFA World Cup qualification	Arthur, Richarlison	0	
994	4 June 2021	Estádio Beira-Rio, Porto Alegre (H)	Ecuador	2–0	2022 FIFA World Cup qualification	Richarlison, Neymar	0	
995	8 June 2021	Estadio Defensores del Chaco, Asunción (A)	Paraguay	2–0	2022 FIFA World Cup qualification	Neymar, Paquetá	0	
996	13 June 2021	Estádio Nacional Mané Garrincha, Brasília (N)	Venezuela	3–0	2021 Copa América	Marquinhos, Neymar, Gabriel Barbosa	0	
997	17 June 2021	Estádio Olímpico Nilton Santos, Rio de Janeiro (N)	Peru	4–0	2021 Copa América	Alex Sandro, Neymar, Ribeiro, Richarlison	0	
998	23 June 2021	Estádio Olímpico Nilton Santos, Rio de Janeiro (N)	Colombia	2–1	2021 Copa América	Firmino, Casemiro	0	
999	27 June 2021	Estádio Olímpico Pedro Ludovico, Goiânia (N)	Ecuador	1–1	2021 Copa América	Militão	0	
1,000	2 July 2021	Estádio Olímpico Nilton Santos, Rio de Janeiro (N)	Chile	1–0	2021 Copa América	Paquetá	0	
1,001	5 July 2021	Estádio Olímpico Nilton Santos, Rio de Janeiro (N)	Peru	1–0	2021 Copa América	Paquetá	0	
1,002	10 July 2021	Maracanã Stadium, Rio de Janeiro (N)	Argentina	0–1	2021 Copa América		7,800	
1,003	2 September 2021	Estadio Monumental, Santiago (A)	Chile	1–0	2022 FIFA World Cup qualification	Ribeiro	11,000	
—	5 September 2021	Arena Corinthians, São Paulo (H)	Argentina	–	2022 FIFA World Cup qualification		—	
1,004	9 September 2021	Arena Pernambuco, São Lourenço da Mata (H)	Peru	2–0	2022 FIFA World Cup qualification	Ribeiro, Neymar	0	
1,005	7 October 2021	Olympic Stadium, Caracas (A)	Venezuela	3–1	2022 FIFA World Cup qualification	Marquinhos, Gabriel Barbosa, Antony	6,000	
1,006	10 October 2021	Estadio Metropolitano, Barranquilla (A)	Colombia	0–0	2022 FIFA World Cup qualification		35,000	
1,007	14 October 2021	Arena da Amazônia, Manaus (H)	Uruguay	4–1	2022 FIFA World Cup qualification	Neymar, Raphinha (2), Gabriel Barbosa	12,500	
1,008	11 November 2021	Arena Corinthians, São Paulo (H)	Colombia	1–0	2022 FIFA World Cup qualification	Paquetá	20,080	
1,009	16 November 2021	Estadio San Juan del Bicentenario, San Juan (A)	Argentina	0–0	2022 FIFA World Cup qualification		25,000	
1,010	27 January 2022	Estadio Rodrigo Paz Delgado, Quito (A)	Ecuador	1–1	2022 FIFA World Cup qualification	Casemiro	17,992	
1,011	1 February 2022	Mineirão, Belo Horizonte (H)	Paraguay	4–0	2022 FIFA World Cup qualification	Rapinha, Coutinho, Antony, Rodrygo	32,344	
1,012	24 March 2022	Maracanã Stadium, Rio de Janeiro (H)	Chile	4–0	2022 FIFA World Cup qualification	Neymar, Vinícius Júnior, Coutinho, Richarlison	69,368	
1,013	29 March 2022	Estadio Hernando Siles, La Paz (A)	Bolivia	4–0	2022 FIFA World Cup qualification	Paquetá, Richarlison (2), Bruno Guimarães	—	
1,014	2 June 2022	Seoul World Cup Stadium, Seoul (A)	South Korea	5–1	Friendly	Richarlison, Neymar (2), Coutinho, Jesus	—	
1,015	6 June 2022	Japan National Stadium, Tokyo (A)	Japan	1–0	2022 Kirin Challenge Cup	Neymar	63,638	
1,016	23 September 2022	Stade Océane, Le Havre (N)	Ghana	3–0	Friendly	Marquinhos, Richarlison (2)	—	
1,017	27 September 2022	Parc des Princes, Paris (N)	Tunisia	5–1	Friendly	Raphinha (2), Richarlison, Neymar, Pedro	—	
1,018	24 November 2022	Lusail Iconic Stadium, Lusail (N)	Serbia	2–0	2022 FIFA World Cup	Richarlison (2)	88,103	
1,019	28 November 2022	Stadium 974, Doha (N)	Switzerland	1–0	2022 FIFA World Cup	Casemiro	43,649	
1,020	2 December 2022	Lusail Iconic Stadium, Lusail (N)	Cameroon	0–1	2022 FIFA World Cup		85,986	
1,021	5 December 2022	Stadium 974, Doha (N)	South Korea	4–1	2022 FIFA World Cup	Vinícius Júnior, Neymar, Richarlison, Paquetá	43,847	
1,022	9 December 2022	Education City Stadium, Al Rayyan (N)	Croatia	1–1 (a.e.t.) (2–4p)	2022 FIFA World Cup	Neymar	43,893	
1,023	25 March 2023	Ibn Batouta Stadium, Tangier (A)	Morocco	1–2	Friendly	Casemiro	63,500	
1,024	17 June 2023	RCDE Stadium, Barcelona (N)	Guinea	4–1	Friendly	Joelinton, Rodrygo, Militão, Vinícius Júnior	20,000	
1,025	20 June 2023	Estádio José Alvalade, Lisbon (N)	Senegal	2–4	Friendly	Paquetá, Marquinhos	25,000	
1,026	8 September 2023	Mangueirão, Belém (H)	Bolivia	5–1	2026 FIFA World Cup qualification	Rodrygo (2), Raphinha, Neymar (2)	43,188	
1,027	12 September 2023	Estádio Nacional, Lima (A)	Peru	1–0	2026 FIFA World Cup qualification	Marquinhos	56,328	
1,028	12 October 2023	Arena Pantanal, Cuiabá (H)	Venezuela	1–1	2026 FIFA World Cup qualification	Gabriel	39,018	
1,029	17 October 2023	Estadio Centenatio, Montevideo (A)	Uruguay	0–2	2026 FIFA World Cup qualification		52,477	
1,030	16 November 2023	Estadio Metropolitano, Barranquilla (A)	Colombia	1–2	2026 FIFA World Cup qualification	Martinelli	44,604	
1,031	21 November 2023	Maracanã Stadium, Rio de Janeiro (H)	Argentina	0–1	2026 FIFA World Cup qualification		68,138	
1,032	23 March 2024	Wemblew Stadium, London (A)	England	1–0	Friendly	Endrick	83,467	
1,033	26 March 2024	Santiago Bernabéu, Madrid (A)	Spain	3–3	Friendly	Rodrygo, Endrick, Paquetá	—	
1,034	8 June 2024	Kyle Field, College Station (N)	Mexico	3–2	Friendly	Pereira, Martinelli, Endrick	85,249	
1,035	12 June 2024	Camping World Stadium, Orlando (A)	United States	1–1	Friendly	Rodrygo	60,016	
1,036	24 June 2024	SoFi Stadium, Inglewood (N)	Costa Rica	0–0	2024 Copa América		67,158	
1,037	28 June 2024	Allegiant Stadium, Paradise (N)	Paraguay	4–1	2024 Copa América	Vinícius Júnior (2), Sávio, Paquetá	46,939	
1,038	2 July 2024	Levi's Stadium, Santa Clara (N)	Colombia	1–1	2024 Copa América	Raphinha	70,971	
1,039	6 July 2024	Allegiant Stadium, Paradise (N)	Uruguay	0–0 (2–4p)	2024 Copa América		55,770	
1,040	6 September 2024	Estádio Couto Pereira, Curitiba (H)	Ecuador	1–0	2026 FIFA World Cup qualification	Rodrygo	36,914	
1,041	10 September 2024	Estadio Defensores del Chaco, Asunción (A)	Paraguay	0–1	2026 FIFA World Cup qualification		31,962	
1,042	10 October 2024	Estadio Nacional, Santiago (A)	Chile	2–1	2026 FIFA World Cup qualification	Igor Jesus, Luiz Henrique	43,059	
1,043	15 October 2024	Estádio Nacional Mané Garrincha, Brasília (H)	Peru	4–0	2026 FIFA World Cup qualification	Raphinha (2), Pereira, Luiz Henrique	60,139	
1,044	14 November 2024	Estadio Monumental, Maturín (A)	Venezuela	1–1	2026 FIFA World Cup qualification	Raphinha	32,223	
1,045	19 November 2024	Arena Fonte Nova, Salvador (H)	Uruguay	1–1	2026 FIFA World Cup qualification	Gerson	41,511	
1,046	20 March 2025	Estádio Nacional Mané Garrincha, Brasília (H)	Colombia	2–1	2026 FIFA World Cup qualification	Raphinha, Vinícius Júnior	70,027	
1,047	25 March 2025	Estadio Monumental, Buenos Aires (A)	Argentina	1–4	2026 FIFA World Cup qualification	Cunha	—	
1,048	5 June 2025	Estadio Monumental, Guayaquil (A)	Ecuador	0–0	2026 FIFA World Cup qualification		—	
1,049	10 June 2025	Neo Química Arena, São Paulo (H)	Paraguay	1–0	2026 FIFA World Cup qualification	Vinícius Júnior	46,316	
1,050	4 September 2025	Maracanã Stadium, Rio de Janeiro (H)	Chile	3–0	2026 FIFA World Cup qualification	Willian, Paquetá, Guimarães	57,326	
1,051	9 September 2025	El Alto Municipal Stadium, El Alto (A)	Bolivia	0–1	2026 FIFA World Cup qualification		—	
1,052	10 October 2025	Seoul World Cup Stadium, Seoul (A)	South Korea	5–0	Friendly	Estêvão, Rodrygo (2), Vinícius Júnior	63,237	
1,053	14 October 2025	Ajinomoto Stadium, Chōfu (A)	Japan	2–3	Friendly	Paulo Henrique, Martinelli	44,920	
1,054	15 November 2025	Emirates Stadium, London (N)	Senegal	2–0	Friendly	Estêvão, Casemiro	58,657	
1,055	18 November 2025	Stade Pierre-Mauroy, Villeneuve-d'Ascq (N)	Tunisia	1–1	Friendly	Estêvão	47,500	
1,056	26 March 2026	Gillette Stadium, Foxborough (N)	France	1–2	Friendly	Bremer	66,215	
1,057	31 March 2026	Camping World Stadium, Orlando (N)	Croatia	3–1	Friendly	Danilo, Igor Thiago, Martinelli	46,398	
1,058	31 May 2026	Maracanã Stadium, Rio de Janeiro (H)	Panama	6–2	Friendly	Vinícius Júnior, Casemiro, Rayan, Paquetá, Igor Thiago, Danilo	72,140	
1,059	6 June 2026	Huntington Bank Field, Cleveland (N)	Egypt	2–1	Friendly	Guimarães, Endrick	64,311	
1,060	13 June 2026	MetLife Stadium, East Rutherford (N)	Morocco	1–1	2026 FIFA World Cup	Vinícius Júnior	80,663	
1,061	19 June 2026	Lincoln Financial Field, Philadelphia (N)	Haiti	3–0	2026 FIFA World Cup	Cunha (2), Vinícius Júnior	68,324	
1,062	24 June 2026	Hard Rock Stadium, Miami Gardens (N)	Scotland	3–0	2026 FIFA World Cup	Vinícius Júnior (2), Cunha	64,478	
1,063	29 June 2026	NRG Stadium, Houston (N)	Japan	2–1	2026 FIFA World Cup	Casemiro, Martinelli	68,777	
1,064	5 July 2026	MetLife Stadium, East Rutherford (N)	Norway	1–2	2026 FIFA World Cup	Neymar	80,663	
1,065	25 September 2026	North Queensland Stadium, Townsville (A)	Australia	1–1	Friendly	Rayan	25,440	
1,066	29 September 2026	Lang Park, Brisbane (A)	Australia	4–2	Friendly	Vanderson, Raphinha, Guimarães, Vinícius	52,423	
1,067	3 October 2026	Salt Lake Stadium, Kolkata (A)	India	4–0	Friendly	Estêvão, Pedro, Lino (2)	51,402	
1,068	13 November 2026	National Stadium, Kallang (A)	Japan	2–3	Friendly	Vinícius Júnior (2)	38,688	
1,069	17 November 2026	National Stadium, Kallang (A)	Singapore	7–0	Friendly	Júnior (3), Endrick, Willian, Rayan		

Notes

1. A: 3–3 on aggregate. Brazil won on penalties.
2. B: The Brazil–Argentina match at the 2018 Superclásico Championship doubled as the 2018 Superclásico de las Américas.
3. C: Match held behind closed doors due to the COVID-19 pandemic in South America.
4. D: Matches due to be held in March 2021 were postponed due to travel and quarantine restrictions caused by the COVID-19 pandemic. These matches were instead played in September and October 2021.
5. E: Brazil's match with Argentina during qualification for the 2022 FIFA World Cup was suspended after 10 minutes when officials from Brazilian health authority ANVISA intervened after it was alleged that four Argentine players based in the United Kingdom – Emiliano Buendía, Emiliano Martínez, Giovani Lo Celso and Cristian Romero – had broken quarantine rules. Following an investigation, the four players were suspended for Argentina's final two qualification matches in March 2022 and the match was ordered to be replayed at a later date. However, on 16 August 2022, FIFA decided to cancel the match as the game would not affect the standing of either Brazil or Argentina and after Argentina accepted to pay a fine.

== Record by opponent ==
Team	Pld	W	D	L	GF	GA	GD	WPCT
Argentina	17	6	3	8	18	17	+1	35.29
Australia	4	3	1	0	15	3	+12	75.00
Austria	2	2	0	0	5	1	+4	100.00
Belgium	1	0	0	1	1	2	−1	0.00
Bolivia	8	6	1	1	26	2	+24	75.00
Bosnia and Herzegovina	1	1	0	0	2	1	+1	100.00
Cameroon	3	2	0	1	5	2	+3	66.67
Chile	12	9	2	1	23	7	+16	75.00
China	1	1	0	0	8	0	+8	100.00
Colombia	14	7	5	2	17	12	+5	50.00
Costa Rica	4	3	1	0	4	0	+4	75.00
Croatia	4	3	1	0	9	3	+6	75.00
Czech Republic	1	1	0	0	3	1	+2	100.00
Denmark	1	1	0	0	3	1	+2	100.00
Ecuador	10	6	4	0	15	4	+11	60.00
Egypt	2	2	0	0	4	1	+3	100.00
El Salvador	1	1	0	0	5	0	+5	100.00
England	4	1	2	1	4	4	0	25.00
France	4	2	0	2	7	4	+3	50.00
Gabon	1	1	0	0	2	0	+2	100.00
Germany	3	1	0	2	4	10	−6	33.33
Ghana	2	2	0	0	4	0	+4	100.00
Guinea	1	1	0	0	4	1	+3	100.00
Haiti	2	2	0	0	10	1	+9	100.00
Honduras	3	3	0	0	13	0	+13	100.00
India	1	1	0	0	4	0	+4	100.00
Iran	1	1	0	0	3	0	+3	100.00
Iraq	1	1	0	0	6	0	+6	100.00
Italy	2	1	1	0	6	4	+2	50.00
Ivory Coast	1	1	0	0	3	1	+2	100.00
Japan	7	6	0	1	19	5	+14	85.71
Mexico	7	5	1	1	11	5	+6	71.43
Morocco	2	0	1	1	2	3	−1	0.00
Netherlands	3	0	1	2	1	5	−4	0.00
Nigeria	1	0	1	0	1	1	0	0.00
North Korea	1	1	0	0	2	1	+1	100.00
Norway	1	0	0	1	1	2	−1	0.00
Panama	4	3	1	0	13	3	+10	75.00
Paraguay	11	5	5	1	19	7	+12	45.45
Peru	13	11	0	2	31	6	+25	84.62
Portugal	2	1	1	0	3	1	+2	50.00
Qatar	1	1	0	0	2	0	+2	100.00
Republic of Ireland	1	1	0	0	2	0	+2	100.00
Romania	1	1	0	0	1	0	+1	100.00
Russia	2	1	1	0	4	1	+3	50.00
Saudi Arabia	1	1	0	0	2	0	+2	100.00
Scotland	2	2	0	0	5	0	+5	100.00
Senegal	3	1	1	1	5	5	0	33.33
Serbia	3	3	0	0	5	0	+5	100.00
Singapore	1	1	0	0	7	0	+7	100.00
South Africa	2	2	0	0	6	0	+6	100.00
South Korea	5	5	0	0	24	2	+22	100.00
Spain	2	1	1	0	6	3	+3	50.00
Sweden	1	1	0	0	3	0	+3	100.00
Switzerland	3	1	1	1	2	2	0	33.33
Tanzania	1	1	0	0	5	1	+4	100.00
Tunisia	2	1	1	0	6	2	+4	50.00
Turkey	1	1	0	0	4	0	+4	100.00
Ukraine	1	1	0	0	2	0	+2	100.00
United States	5	4	1	0	13	3	+10	80.00
Uruguay	9	5	3	1	16	8	+8	55.56
Venezuela	10	6	4	0	16	5	+11	60.00
Zambia	1	1	0	0	2	0	+2	100.00
Zimbabwe	1	1	0	0	3	0	+3	100.00
Total	223	147	45	31	477	153	+324	65.92

Source: Results
