= Pablo Guiñazú =

Argentine footballer

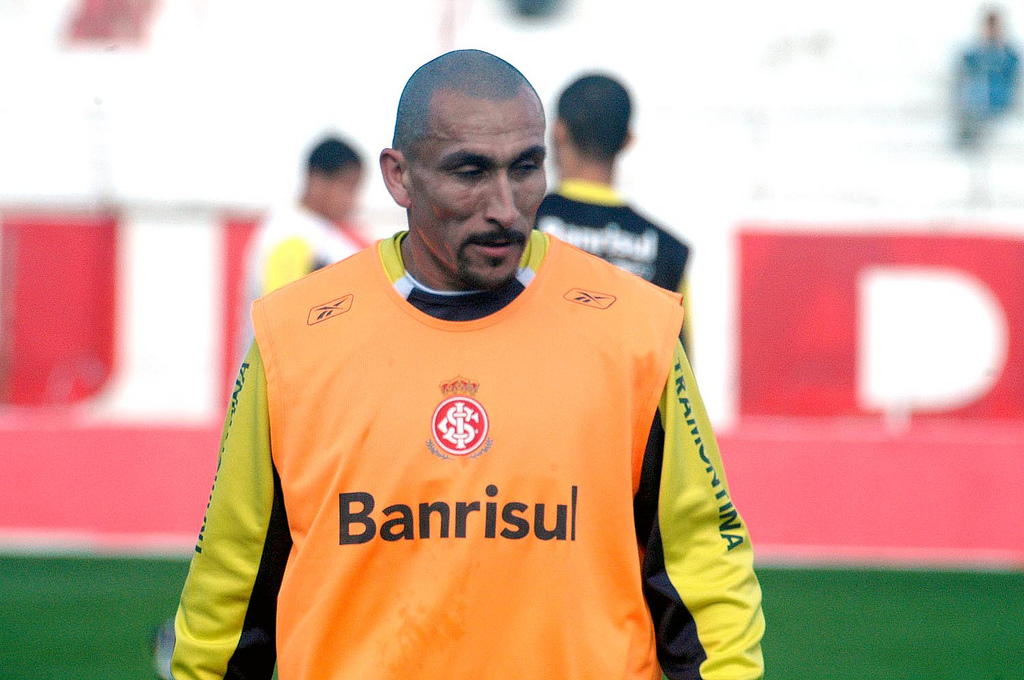
- Guiñazú with Internacional in 2008

Personal information
- Full name: Pablo Horacio Guiñazú
- Date of birth: 26 August 1978 (age 48)
- Place of birth: General Cabrera, Córdoba, Argentina
- Height: 1.72 m (5 ft 8 in)
- Position: Defensive midfielder

Team information
- Current team: Güemes

Youth career
- 1995–1996: Newell's Old Boys

Senior career*
Years	Team	Apps	(Gls)
1996–2000	Newell's Old Boys	119	(5)
2000–2001	Perugia	14	(0)
2001–2003	Independiente	55	(0)
2003	Newell's Old Boys	19	(0)
2004	Saturn Ramenskoe	24	(1)
2004–2007	Libertad	73	(2)
2007–2012	Internacional	282	(4)
2013	Libertad	18	(0)
2013–2015	Vasco da Gama	52	(0)
2016–2019	Talleres	81	(1)
Total		616	(10)

International career
2003–2013	Argentina	16	(0)

Managerial career
- 2020: Talleres (assistant)
- 2021: Atlético Tucumán
- 2022: Sol de América
- 2025: Talleres (interim)
- 2025: Libertad
- 2026–: Güemes
- * Club domestic league appearances and goals

Pablo Horacio Guiñazú (born 26 August 1978) is an Argentine football manager and former player.

A hard-working defensive midfielder, Guiñazú played for a number of clubs in Argentina, Italy, Russia, Paraguay and Brazil, and represented the Argentina national team in 2003, being called up again for the second leg of the 2011 Superclásico de las Américas.

== Career ==
Guiñazu started his professional career with Newell's Old Boys in 1996. He played over 100 games for the club before joining Italian side Perugia. He returned to Argentina in 2001 to play for Independiente, where he was part of the Apertura 2002 championship team.

In 2003, he returned to Newell's Old Boys before joining Russian team Saturn. After one season in Russia he returned to South America to play for Libertad in Paraguay. He was part of the team that won the Paraguayan Primera División in 2006.

In 2007 Guiñazu joined Internacional in Brazil. On 4 January 2013, he terminated his contract with Internacional for private reasons, and returned to Libertad.

He returned to Argentina in 2016 after signing for Talleres de Córdoba. After more than six years without scoring a goal, Guiñazú scored the goal that gave Talleres promotion to Argentine Primera División after a 12-year absence.

On 1 March 2019, Guiñazú announced his retirement after Talleres failed to qualify to Copa Libertadores group stage.

== Personal life ==
His son, Lucas, was born in Paraguay when he played for Libertad and has taken part of both Argentina and Paraguay squads at under-17 level.

== Career statistics ==
=== International ===
National team	Year	Apps	Goals
Argentina	2003	4	0
Argentina	2011	2	0
Argentina	2012	8	0
Argentina	2013	2	0
Argentina	Total	16	0

=== International appearances and goals ===
#	Date	Venue	Opponent	Final score	Goal	Result	Competition
1.	31 January 2003	San Pedro Sula, Honduras	Honduras	3–1	0	Won	Friendly
2.	4 February 2003	Los Angeles, United States	Mexico	1–0	0	Won	Friendly
3.	8 February 2003	Miami, United States	United States	1–0	0	Won	Friendly
4.	16 July 2003	La Plata, Argentina	Uruguay	2–2	0	Drew	Friendly
5.	28 September 2011	Belém, Brazil	Brazil	0–2	0	Lost	Superclásico de las Américas.
6.	15 November 2011	Barranquilla, Colombia	Colombia	2–1	0	Won	2014 World Cup qualification
7.	9 June 2012	East Rutherford, United States	Brazil	4–3	0	Won	Friendly
8.	15 August 2012	Frankfurt, Germany	Germany	3–1	0	Won	Friendly
9.	7 September 2012	Córdoba, Argentina	Paraguay	3–1	0	Won	2014 World Cup qualification
10.	11 September 2012	Lima, Peru	Peru	1–1	0	Drew	2014 World Cup qualification
11.	19 September 2012	Goiânia, Brazil	Brazil	1–2	0	Lost	Superclásico de las Américas
12.	12 October 2012	Mendoza, Argentina	Uruguay	3–0	0	Won	2014 World Cup qualification
13.	16 October 2012	Santiago, Chile	Chile	2–1	0	Won	2014 World Cup qualification
14.	21 November 2012	Buenos Aires, Argentina	Brazil	2–1	0	Won	Superclásico de las Américas
15.	26 March 2013	La Paz, Bolivia	Bolivia	1–1	0	Drew	2014 World Cup qualification
16.	14 June 2013	Guatemala City, Guatemala	Guatemala	4–0	0	Won	Friendly

== Honours ==
=== Club ===
Independiente

- Torneo Apertura: 2002

Libertad

- Paraguayan Primera División: 2006

Internacional

- Campeonato Gaúcho: 2008, 2009, 2011, 2012
- Copa Sudamericana: 2008
- Suruga Bank Championship: 2009
- Copa Libertadores: 2010
- Recopa Sudamericana: 2011

Vasco da Gama

- Campeonato Carioca: 2015

=== Individual ===
- Campeonato Brasileiro Série A Team of the Year: 2009
