= Superclásico de las Américas =

- The trophy awarded to champions
- Organizer(s): CONMEBOL
- Founded: 2011; 14 years ago
- Region: Argentina; Brazil
- Teams: 2
- Related competitions: Roca Cup
- Current champion: Argentina (2nd title) (2019)
- Most championships: Brazil (4 titles)

The Superclassic of the Americas (Portuguese: Superclássico das Américas, Spanish: Superclásico de las Américas), was an annual friendly football match between the national teams of Argentina and Brazil.

Established in 2011 and organized by CONMEBOL, the Superclásico de las Américas is a successor of the Roca Cup, a similar competition held from 1914 to 1976.

== Format ==
The competition was played over two legs in 2011 and 2012: one leg in Argentina, the other in Brazil. The team that hosts the first leg will alternate with each edition; the location of the first leg in the first edition was determined by a draw of lots. The country that accumulates the most points after both legs will win the competition, followed by goal difference and a penalty shoot-out if necessary. The format was changed in 2014 and now the game takes place as a one-off match in a neutral venue.

In the 2011 and 2012 editions the squads of each team were composed of footballers playing in either the Argentine or Brazilian league. However, this rule was changed for the 2014 edition and both teams can now call up players based in other countries, such as those of Europe.

The November 2010 friendly match between the two teams in Qatar was originally planned also as an attempt to restart the Roca Cup, but eventually was not presented as such by the match organizers. Instead it continued the short-lived tradition of the Brazil team to play against a traditional team towards the end of the calendar year on Qatari soil as a means of marketing and preparation for the 2022 FIFA World Cup - Brazil had already played England there in November 2009, and would play against 10-time Africa Cup of Nations and Arab regional powerhouse Egypt in November 2011. The 2022 edition of the match was scheduled to be played in June in Australia, but it was cancelled after AFA opted to participate instead in the CONMEBOL–UEFA Cup of Champions in England.

== List of champions ==
=== Matches ===
Keys

- aet: after extra time
- p: defined on penalty shoot-out
- Aggregate score result

Ed.	Year	Winner	Runner-up	Score	Venue	City
1	2011	Brazil	Argentina	0–0	Mario Kempes	Córdoba, Argentina
1	2011	Brazil	Argentina	2–0	Mangueirão	Belém, Brazil
1	2011	Brazil	Argentina	2–0		
2	2012	Brazil	Argentina	2–1	Serra Dourada	Goiânia, Brazil
2	2012	Brazil	Argentina	1–2	La Bombonera	Buenos Aires, Argentina
2	2012	Brazil	Argentina	3–3 (4–3, p)		
3	2014	Brazil	Argentina	2–0	National Stadium	Beijing, China
4	2017	Argentina	Brazil	1–0	Cricket Ground	Melbourne, Australia
5	2018	Brazil	Argentina	1–0	King Abdullah	Jeddah, Saudi Arabia
6	2019	Argentina	Brazil	1–0	Mrsool Park	Riyadh, Saudi Arabia

=== Titles by country ===
Teams	Titles	Years wins
Brazil	4	2011, 2012, 2014, 2018
Argentina	2	2017, 2019

=== All-time scorers ===
Player	Goals
(Brazil) Neymar	2
(Argentina) Ignacio Scocco	2
(Brazil) Diego Tardelli	2
(Brazil) Fred	1
(Brazil) Lucas Moura	1
(Argentina) Juan Manuel Martínez	1
(Argentina) Gabriel Mercado	1
(Argentina) Lionel Messi	1
(Brazil) Miranda	1
(Brazil) Paulinho	1
