= Estadio Centenario (Resistencia) =

Football stadium in Resistencia, Argentina

Centennial Stadium (Resistencia)
- Estadio Centenario
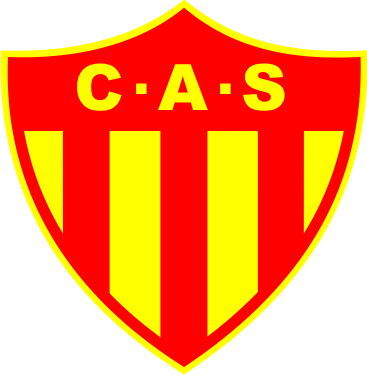

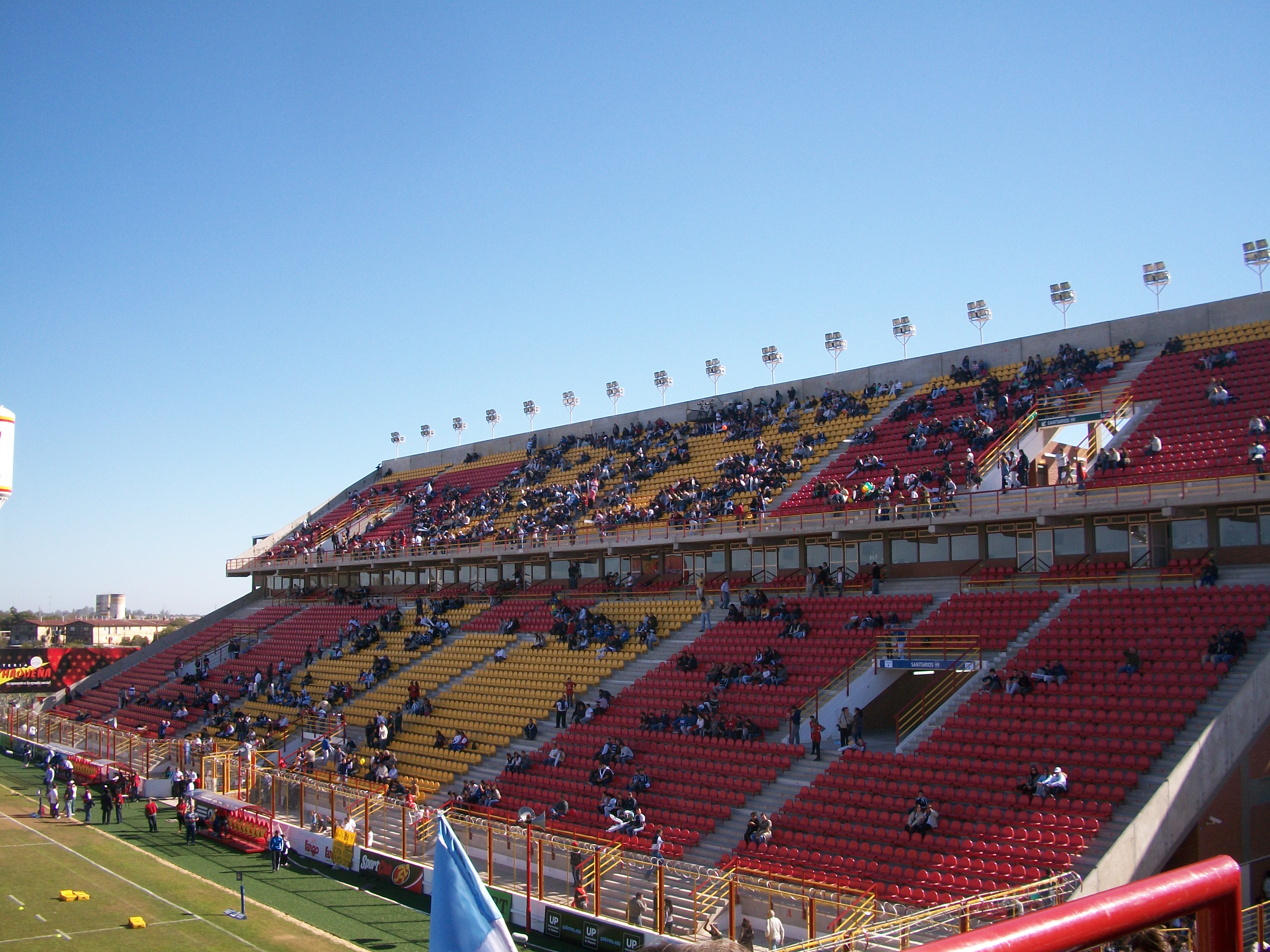
- The stadium in 2011
- Interactive map of Centennial Stadium (Resistencia)
- Former names: Estadio Centenario – Campeones del mundo 1978-1986
- Address: Resistencia, Chaco; Argentina
- Owner: C.A. Sarmiento
- Capacity: 25,000
- Type: Stadium
- Surface: Grass
- Parking: yes

Construction
- Opened: May 24, 2011; 15 years ago

Tenants
- Sarmiento (R) (2011–present); Argentina football team (2011); Argentina rugby team (2011)

Estadio Centenario is a football stadium located in the city of Resistencia of Chaco Province, Argentina. The stadium is owned and operated by C.A. Sarmiento. It has a capacity of 25,000 spectators and was inaugurated in 2011, being one of the newest stadiums in the country. Stadium's facilities include parking lots, restaurants, a synthetic grass field hockey pitch, and a boxing ring.

The first name chosen for the stadium was "Estadio Centenario - Campeones del mundo 1978-1986" as a tribute to the 1978 and 1986 Argentina World Champions teams, but the name "Estadio Centenario" has remained as its predominant name.

== History ==
The first project for a new stadium had been launched in 2007 as part of an integral plan of modernisation of C.A. Sarmiento by Jorge Capitanich, then president of the institution. The project also included the construction of apartment buildings (where the former stadium stood), an indoor arena, and four Olympic-size swimming pools. The new stadium would be built on a land at Avenida Alvear 1750. Works began in 2009 and were intended to be finished for September 2010 (the 100th. anniversary of Club Sarmiento), nevertheless they were delayed.

The stadium was officially inaugurated on 24 May 2011 with a celebration presided by then Governor of Chaco Jorge Capitanich. One day later Estadio Centeraio hosted its first match, a friendly game between Argentina and Paraguay national teams, won by the local side 4–2. The date of inauguration was chosen in commemoration of the 111th. anniversary of the May Revolution.

The stadium was chosen as one of the venues for the 2012 Superclásico de las Américas scheduled for 12 October. Nevertheless a failure in its lighting system forced the organisers to choose another stadium so the match was finally held in La Bombonera on 21 November.

Since its inception, Estadio Centenario has been a frequent venue of Copa Argentina matches.

Apart from football, Estadio Centenario has also hosted rugby union matches. The Argentina national team played there for the first time in June 2011 v British side Barbarians., being defeated 21–18).

== Other facilities ==
Stadium's facilities include parking lots, restaurants, a synthetic grass field hockey pitch, and a boxing ring.

== Concerts ==
Apart from sporting events, Estadio Centenario has hosted several music concerts. Some musicians that have performed there are Ricky Martin (2011), Marco Antonio Solís (2011, 2022), Joan Manuel Serrat & Joaquín Sabina (2012), Violetta (2015) and Skay Beilinson (with his band Los Fakires).
