= Gabriel Mercado =

Argentine association football player

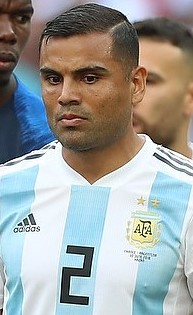
- Mercado with Argentina at the 2018 FIFA World Cup

Personal information
- Full name: Gabriel Iván Mercado
- Date of birth: 18 March 1987 (age 39)
- Place of birth: Puerto Madryn, Argentina
- Height: 1.81 m (5 ft 11 in)
- Position: Defender

Team information
- Current team: Internacional
- Number: 25

Youth career
- Racing Club

Senior career*
Years	Team	Apps	(Gls)
2006–2010	Racing Club	96	(1)
2010–2012	Estudiantes LP	66	(10)
2012–2016	River Plate	144	(11)
2016–2019	Sevilla	78	(5)
2019–2021	Al-Rayyan	40	(4)
2021–	Internacional	126	(4)

International career^{‡}
2007	Argentina U20	11	(0)
2010–2019	Argentina	25	(4)
Medal record
Men's football
Representing Argentina
FIFA U-20 World Cup
Winner	2007	U-20 Team
- * Club domestic league appearances and goals as of 8 April 2026 ‡ National team caps and goals as of 22 March 2019

Gabriel Iván Mercado (born 18 March 1987) is an Argentine professional footballer who plays for Internacional. Mainly a right back, he could also play as a central defender.

He began his career with Racing Club and Estudiantes before joining River Plate in 2012, going on to win six domestic and international tournaments including the 2015 Copa Libertadores. In 2016, he joined Sevilla for €2.5 million.

Mercado made his international debut for Argentina in 2010, and was part of their squad that came runners-up at the Copa América Centenario, and also took part at the 2018 FIFA World Cup.

== Club career ==
=== Early career ===
Born in Puerto Madryn, Chubut, Mercado made his professional debut for Racing Club on 21 February 2007 in a 0–1 home defeat to San Lorenzo. He went on to establish himself as a regular member of the Racing first team.

In July 2010, Mercado joined Estudiantes de La Plata for $800,000 and 50% of his rights. He won the Apertura in his debut season, and stayed at the club until 2012.

In July 2012, he signed for River Plate.

=== Sevilla ===
On 4 August 2016, La Liga side Sevilla FC signed Mercado from River Plate on a three-year deal for a reported fee of €2.5 million, with River retaining 20% of a subsequent transfer fee. He was signed by compatriot manager Jorge Sampaoli to replace former captain Coke.

He scored his first goal for the team on 20 September, deflecting Samir Nasri's free kick for the only score in a home Seville derby win over Real Betis.

=== Al-Rayyan ===
On 11 June 2019, Al-Rayyan SC announced via their social media that they had signed Mercado.

=== Internacional ===
On 5 July 2021, he was announced and signed with Internacional until December 2022 after being without a club at the end of his contract with Al-Rayyan. His chosen jersey number was jersey number 25.

== International career ==
=== Youth career ===
Mercado represented the Argentina Under-20 team at the 2007 South American Youth Championship in Paraguay and at the 2007 FIFA U-20 World Cup in Canada.

=== Senior career ===
Mercado made his full international debut for the Argentina national team after being called up to join Diego Maradona's squad of Argentina-based players who beat Jamaica 2–1 on 10 February 2010.

Mercado was first-choice in his position for Argentina in the 2016 Copa América Centenario squad, playing in the final against Chile for the full 120-minutes, a 4–2 loss on penalties.

In May 2018, Mercado was named in Argentina's preliminary 35-man squad for the 2018 FIFA World Cup in Russia; later that month, he was included in Jorge Sampaoli's final 23-man squad for the tournament. In the round of 16 match against France on 30 June, Mercado scored in a 4–3 defeat, which saw Argentina eliminated from the competition.

== Career statistics ==
=== International ===
As of match played 22 March 2019

Appearances and goals by national team and year
National team	Year	Apps	Goals
Argentina	2010	1	0
Argentina	2011	0	0
Argentina	2012	0	0
Argentina	2013	0	0
Argentina	2014	0	0
Argentina	2015	1	0
Argentina	2016	10	2
Argentina	2017	5	1
Argentina	2018	7	1
Argentina	2019	1	0
Total		25	4

Scores and results list Argentina's goal tally first.

List of international goals scored by Gabriel Mercado
No.	Date	Venue	Opponent	Score	Result	Competition
1	24 March 2016	Estadio Nacional Julio Martínez Prádanos, Santiago, Chile	Chile	2–1	2–1	2018 FIFA World Cup qualification
2	29 March 2016	Estadio Mario Alberto Kempes, Córdoba, Argentina	Bolivia	1–0	2–0	2018 FIFA World Cup qualification
3	9 June 2017	Melbourne Cricket Ground, Melbourne, Australia	Brazil	1–0	1–0	2017 Superclásico de las Américas
4	30 June 2018	Kazan Arena, Kazan, Russia	France	2–1	3–4	2018 FIFA World Cup

== Honours ==
Estudiantes

- Argentine Primera División: 2010 Apertura

River Plate

- Argentine Primera División: Torneo Final 2014
- Copa Campeonato: 2013–14
- Copa Sudamericana: 2014
- Recopa Sudamericana: 2015
- Copa Libertadores: 2015
- Copa Suruga Bank: 2015
- Copa Argentina: 2016

Argentina

- FIFA U-20 World Cup: 2007
- Copa América runner-up: 2016
- Superclásico de las Américas: 2017
