= 2012 Superclásico de las Américas =

- Event: Superclásico de las Américas
Brazil	Argentina
(Brazil)	(Argentina)
3	3
- on aggregate Brazil won 4–3 on penalties

First leg
Brazil	Argentina
2	1
- Date: 19 September 2012
- Venue: Estádio Serra Dourada, Goiânia, Brazil
- Referee: Carlos Amarilla (Paraguay)
- Attendance: 37,871

Second leg
Argentina	Brazil
2	1
- Date: 21 November 2012
- Venue: La Bombonera, Buenos Aires, Argentina
- Referee: Enrique Osses (Chile)
- Attendance: 32,000

The 2012 Superclásico de las Américas – Copa Doctor Nicolás Leoz was the second edition of the Superclásico de las Américas. Brazil won 4–3 on penalties after a 3–3 draw on aggregate and conquered their second title.

The first leg was played at Estádio Serra Dourada, Goiânia, which Brazil won, 2–1. The second leg was originally scheduled to be played on 3 October 2012, at the Estadio Centenario in Resistencia, Chaco, but was postponed due to a power failure in the stadium. Both the CBF and AFA agreed on a new date for the match, and it was chosen to be held on 21 November 2012 at La Bombonera, Buenos Aires. Argentina won the second leg 2–1, leading to a draw on aggregate that was decided in Brazil's favor on penalties.

== Venues ==
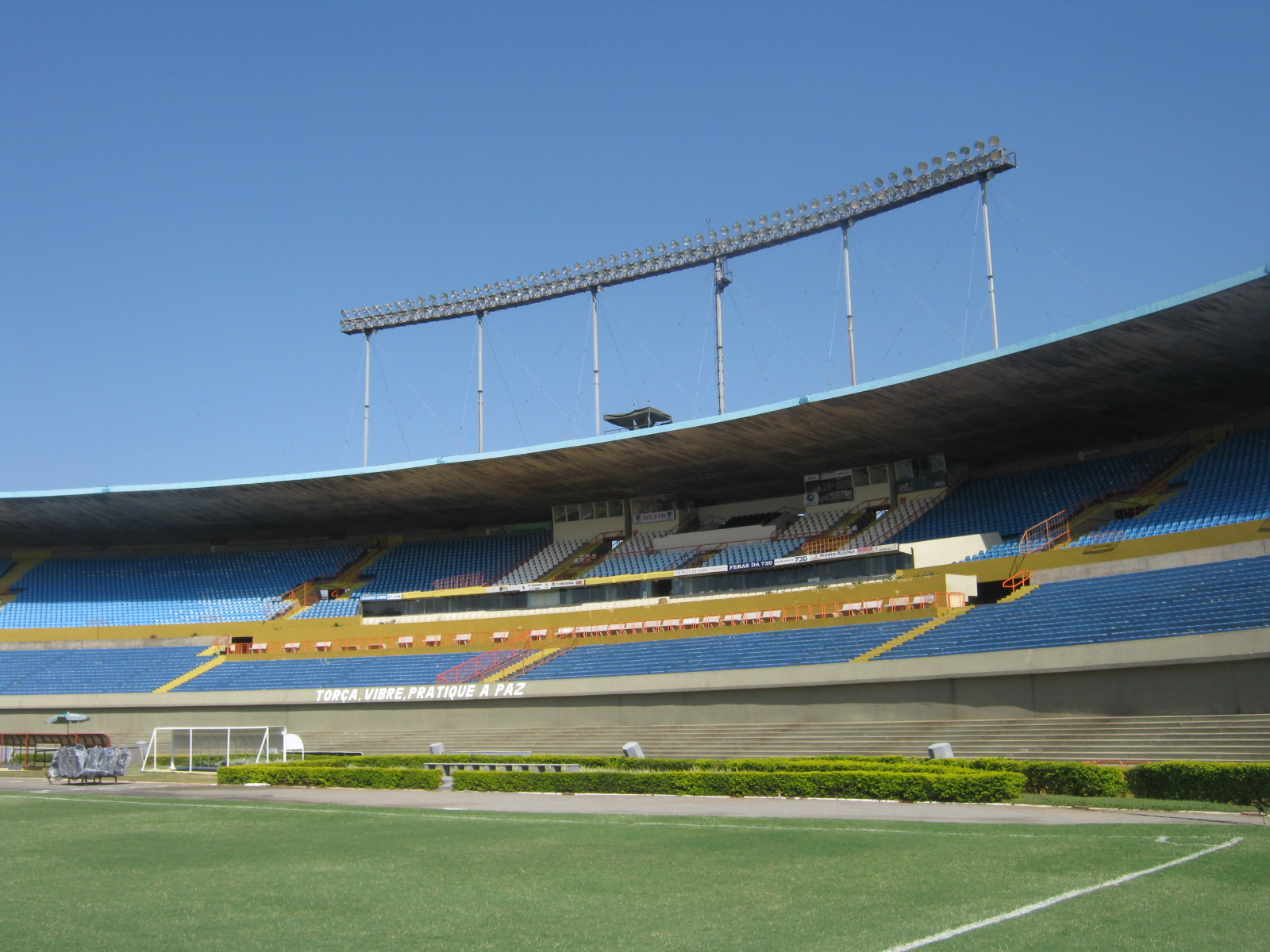
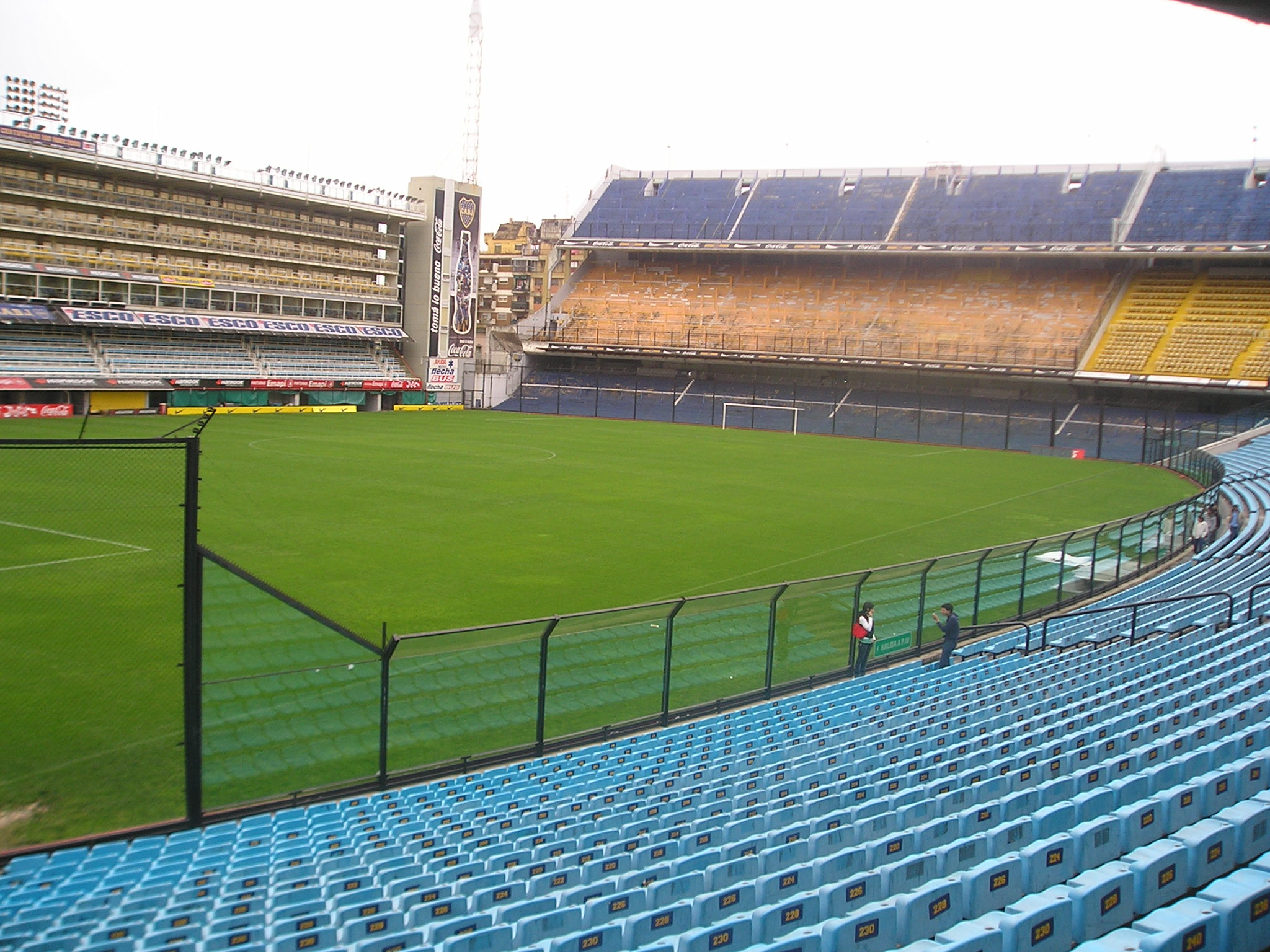
Serra Dourada (Goiânia) and La Bombonera (Buenos Aires) were the stadiums for the matches played in Brazil and Argentina respectively

== Matches ==
=== First leg ===
19 September 2012
22:00 UTC−03:00

Brazil	2–1	Argentina
Paulinho 25'; Neymar 90+3' (pen.)	AFA Report	Martínez 19'

Estádio Serra Dourada, Goiânia
Attendance: 37,871
Referee: Carlos Amarilla (Paraguay)

Brazil	Argentina

GK	1	Jefferson
DF	16	Fábio Santos
DF	2	Lucas Marques
DF	4	Réver
DF	3	Dedé
MF	10	Jádson		(substituted off) 62'
MF	5	Paulinho	(yellow card) 80'
MF	15	Ralf
MF	7	Lucas Moura		(substituted off) 76'
FW	19	Luís Fabiano		(substituted off) 68'
FW	11	Neymar	(yellow card) 88'
Substitutions:
MF	16	Thiago Neves		(substituted on) 62'
FW	9	Leandro Damião		(substituted on) 68'
FW	20	Wellington Nem		(substituted on) 76'
Manager:
(Brazil) Mano Menezes

GK	1	Oscar Ustari
DF	4	Gino Peruzzi
DF	5	Lisandro López		(substituted off) 73'
DF	2	Sebastián Domínguez
DF	6	Leandro Desábato	(yellow card) 90+2'
DF	3	Clemente Rodríguez
MF	11	Maxi Rodríguez
MF	22	Rodrigo Braña
MF	19	Pablo Guiñazú
FW	7	Juan Manuel Martínez		(substituted off) 87'
FW	9	Hernán Barcos		(substituted off) 76'
Substitutions:
DF	13	Santiago Vergini		(substituted on) 73'
FW	17	Rogelio Funes Mori		(substituted on) 76'
MF	15	Leandro Somoza		(substituted on) 87'
Manager:
(Argentina) Alejandro Sabella

Assistant referees:
Rodney Aquino (Paraguay)
Carlos Cáceres (Paraguay)
Fourth official:
Pericles Cortés (Brazil)

=== Second leg ===
21 November 2012
21:00 UTC−03:00

Argentina	2–1	Brazil
Scocco 81' (pen.), 89'	AFA Report	Fred 83'
Penalties
Martínez (penalty missed); Montillo (penalty missed); Domínguez (penalty scored); Scocco (penalty scored); Orión (penalty scored)	3–4	(penalty scored) Thiago Neves; (penalty scored) Jean; (penalty missed) Carlinhos; (penalty scored) Fred; (penalty scored) Neymar

La Bombonera, Buenos Aires
Attendance: 32,000
Referee: Enrique Osses (Chile)

Argentina	Brazil

GK	1	Agustín Orión
DF	4	Gino Peruzzi
DF	6	Sebastián Domínguez
DF	2	Leandro Desábato
DF	3	Lisandro López
DF	14	Leonel Vangioni
MF	19	Pablo Guiñazú	(yellow card) 86'
MF	10	Walter Montillo
MF	5	Francisco Cerro		(substituted off) 88'
FW	7	Juan Manuel Martínez
FW	9	Hernán Barcos		(substituted off) 69'
Substitutions:
FW	21	Ignacio Scocco		(substituted on) 69'
MF	18	Oscar Ahumada		(substituted on) 88'
Manager:
(Argentina) Alejandro Sabella

GK	1	Diego Cavalieri
DF	2	Lucas Marques		(substituted off) 74'
DF	3	Réver	(yellow card) 15'
DF	4	Durval
DF	6	Fábio Santos		(substituted off) 63'
MF	5	Ralf
MF	7	Arouca		(substituted off) 69'
MF	8	Paulinho
MF	10	Thiago Neves
FW	9	Fred	(yellow card) 65'
FW	11	Neymar
Substitutions:
DF	16	Carlinhos		(substituted on) 63'
MF	15	Jean		(substituted on) 69'
MF	28	Bernard		(substituted on) 74'
Manager:
(Brazil) Mano Menezes

Assistant referees:
Francisco Mondria (Chile)
Carlos Astroza (Chile)
Fourth official:
Néstor Pitana (Argentina)
