= 2014 Superclásico de las Américas =

- Event: Superclásico de las Américas
Brazil	Argentina
(Brazil)	(Argentina)
2	0
- Date: 11 October 2014
- Venue: Beijing National Stadium, Beijing
- Referee: Fan Qi (China)
- Attendance: 52,313

The 2014 Superclásico de las Américas – Copa Doctor Nicolás Leoz was the 3rd edition of the Superclásico de las Américas, an annual friendly football match between the national teams of Argentina and Brazil. The match was played at Beijing National Stadium in Beijing, China. This was the first time the competition had taken place on foreign soil. It was also the time players outside the two countries' domestic competitions were allowed to participate as opposed to the original formant of only South America-based players being eligible to compete.

Brazil won 2–0 with both goals scored by Diego Tardelli, while Argentina's Lionel Messi had a penalty saved by Jefferson.

== Details ==
11 October 2014
21:00 (UTC+8)

Brazil	2–0	Argentina
Diego Tardelli 28', 64'	Report

National Stadium, Beijing
Attendance: 52,313
Referee: Fan Qi (China)

Brazil	Argentina

GK	1	Jefferson
RB	2	Danilo	(yellow card) 40'
CB	3	Miranda
CB	4	David Luiz	(yellow card) 19'	(substituted off) 90'
LB	6	Filipe Luís
CM	17	Luiz Gustavo
CM	22	Elias
RW	19	Willian
AM	11	Oscar
LW	10	Neymar (c)		(substituted off) 90'
CF	9	Diego Tardelli		(substituted off) 82'
Substitutes:
MF	20	Kaká		(substituted on) 82'
DF	8	Gil		(substituted on) 90'
FW	7	Robinho		(substituted on) 90'
Manager:
Dunga

GK	1	Sergio Romero
RB	4	Pablo Zabaleta
CB	17	Federico Fernández	(yellow card) 50'
CB	15	Martín Demichelis
LB	16	Marcos Rojo
DM	14	Javier Mascherano	(yellow card) 47'
RM	18	Erik Lamela		(substituted off) 60'
CM	23	Roberto Pereyra		(substituted off) 76'
LM	7	Ángel Di María
SS	10	Lionel Messi (c)
CF	11	Sergio Agüero		(substituted off) 60'
Substitutes:
MF	22	Javier Pastore		(substituted on) 60'
FW	9	Gonzalo Higuaín		(substituted on) 60'
MF	8	Enzo Pérez		(substituted on) 76'
Manager:
Gerardo Martino
