= 2011 Superclásico de las Américas =

- Event: Superclásico de las Américas
Argentina	Brazil
(Argentina)	(Brazil)
0	2
- on aggregate

First leg
Argentina	Brazil
0	0
- Date: 14 September 2011
- Venue: Estadio Mario Alberto Kempes, Córdoba, Argentina
- Referee: Enrique Osses (Chile)
- Attendance: 50,000

Second leg
Brazil	Argentina
2	0
- Date: 28 September 2011
- Venue: Mangueirão, Belém, Brazil
- Referee: Jorge Larrionda (Uruguay)
- Attendance: 45,000

The 2011 Superclásico de las Américas – Copa Doctor Nicolás Leoz was the first edition of the Superclásico de las Américas, an annual friendly football match between the national teams of Argentina and Brazil. After a 0–0 draw in the first leg played in Argentina, Brazil beat Argentina by 2–0 in the second (home) leg and conquered their first title.

== Venues ==
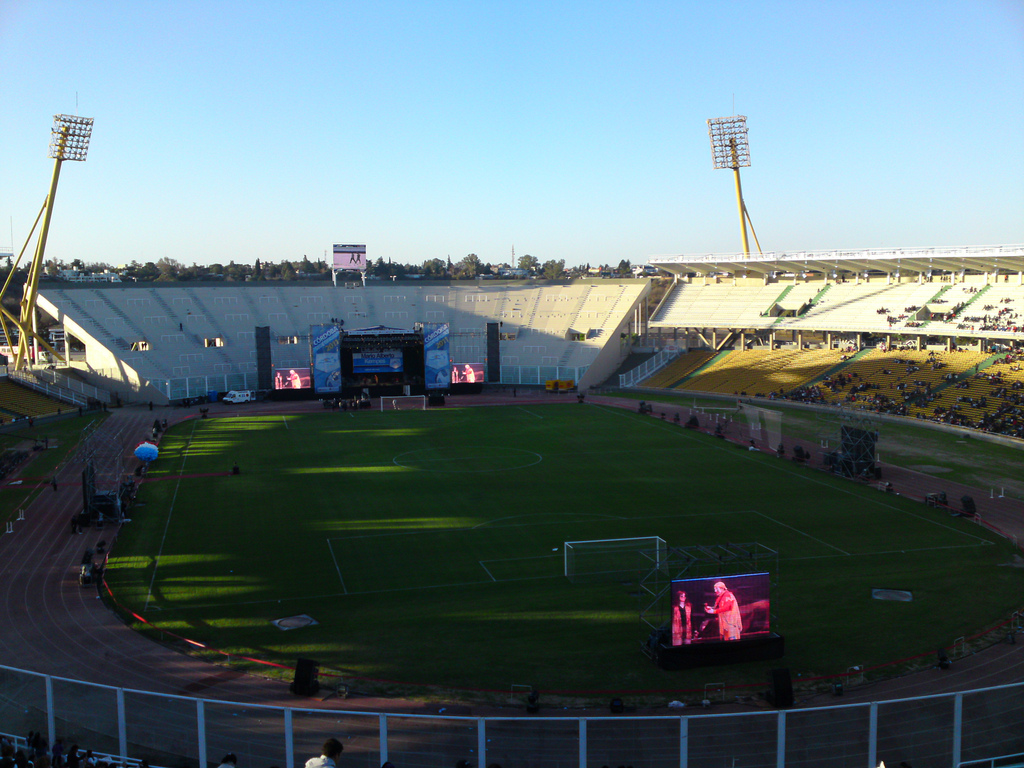
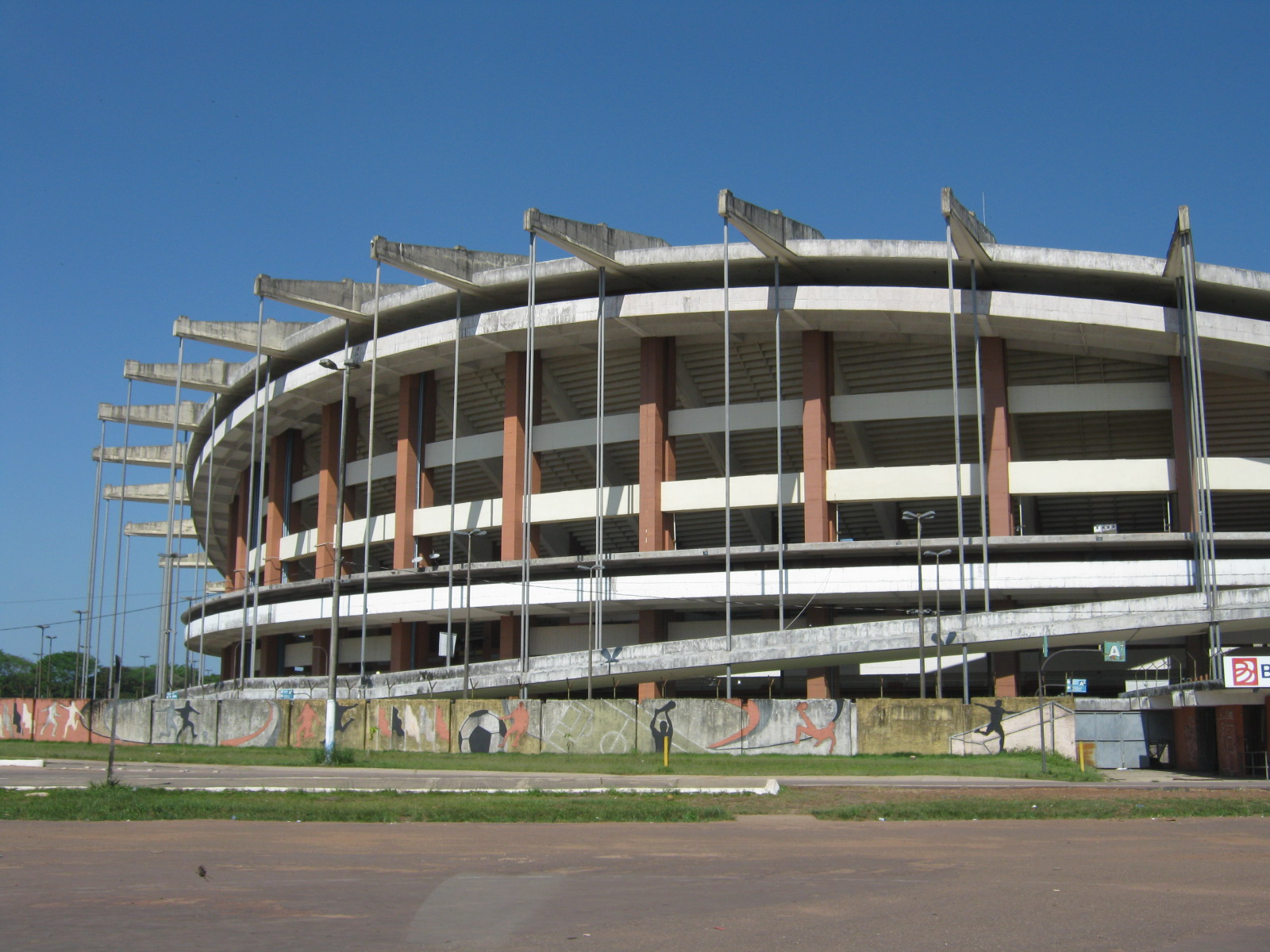
Estadio Mario Alberto Kempes (Córdoba) and the Mangueirão (Belém) were the stadiums for the matches played in Argentina and Brazil respectively

== Matches ==
The order of the legs was determined by a drawing of lots.

=== First leg ===
14 September 2011
21:50 UTC−03:00
First leg

Argentina	0–0	Brazil
	AFA Report

Estadio Mario Alberto Kempes, Córdoba
Referee: Enrique Osses (Chile)

Argentina	Brazil

GK	1	Agustín Orión
CB	2	Leandro Desábato
CB	6	Sebastián Domínguez (c)
CB	5	Cristian Cellay
RWB	4	Iván Pillud
LWB	16	Emiliano Papa
RM	7	Juan Manuel Martínez		(substituted off) 58'
CM	8	Augusto Fernández		(substituted off) 86'
CM	10	Héctor Canteros
LM	11	Víctor Zapata	(yellow card) 66'
CF	9	Mauro Boselli		(substituted off) 24'
Substitutions:
FW	22	Emanuel Gigliotti		(substituted on) 24'
FW	23	Pablo Mouche		(substituted on) 58'
MF	18	Cristian Chávez		(substituted on) 86'
Manager:
Alejandro Sabella

GK	1	Jefferson
RB	2	Danilo
CB	4	Réver
CB	3	Dedé
LB	6	Kléber
CM	5	Ralf
CM	7	Paulinho	(substituted off) 86'
RW	11	Neymar
AM	8	Renato Abreu	(substituted off) 63'
LW	10	Ronaldinho (c)
CF	9	Leandro Damião
Substitutions:
MF	17	Oscar	(substituted on) 63'
MF	22	Casemiro	(substituted on) 86'
Manager:
Mano Menezes

=== Second leg ===
28 September 2011
21:50 UTC−03:00
Second leg

Brazil	2–0	Argentina
Lucas 53'; Neymar 74'	Report

Mangueirão, Belém
Attendance: 45,000
Referee: Jorge Larrionda (Uruguay)

Brazil	Argentina

GK	1	Jefferson
RB	2	Danilo
CB	4	Réver
CB	3	Dedé
LB	6	Bruno Cortez	(substituted off) 87'
RM	7	Lucas Moura	(substituted off) 68'
CM	5	Ralf
CM	8	Rômulo
LM	10	Ronaldinho (c)
CF	9	Borges	(substituted off) 72'
CF	11	Neymar
Substitutions:
FW	18	Diego Souza	(substituted on) 68'
FW	19	Fred	(substituted on) 72'
FW	16	Kléber	(substituted on) 87'
Manager:
Mano Menezes

GK	1	Agustín Orión
CB	2	Leandro Desábato	(yellow card) 70'
CB	6	Sebastián Domínguez (c)
CB	5	Cristian Cellay
DM	11	Pablo Guiñazú
CM	8	Augusto Fernández
CM	10	Héctor Canteros		(substituted off) 59'
RW	4	Iván Pillud		(substituted off) 77'
AM	7	Walter Montillo
LW	16	Emiliano Papa
CF	9	Lucas Viatri
Substitutions:
MF	17	Mario Bolatti		(substituted on) 59'
FW	20	Pablo Mouche		(substituted on) 77'
Manager:
Alejandro Sabella
