= 2019 Superclásico de las Américas =

- Event: Superclásico de las Américas
Brazil	Argentina
(Brazil)	(Argentina)
0	1
- Date: 15 November 2019
- Venue: King Saud University Stadium, Riyadh
- Referee: Matthew Conger (New Zealand)
- Attendance: 22,541

The 2019 Superclásico de las Américas – Copa Doctor Nicolás Leoz was the sixth edition of the Superclásico de las Américas, an annual friendly football match between the national teams of Argentina and Brazil. The match was played at the King Saud University Stadium in Riyadh, Saudi Arabia.

Argentina won the game 1–0 with a goal from Lionel Messi; Messi's penalty was saved by Brazilian goalkeeper Alisson, but he scored on the rebound, giving Argentina its second Superclásico de las Américas title.

== Match ==
=== Details ===
2019 Superclásico de las Américas
15 November 2019
20:00 AST

Brazil	0–1	Argentina
	Report	Messi 13'

King Saud University Stadium, Riyadh
Attendance: 22,541
Referee: Matthew Conger (New Zealand)

Brazil	Argentina

GK	1	Alisson
DF	2	Danilo	(yellow card) 27'
DF	3	Thiago Silva
DF	14	Éder Militão	(yellow card) 64'
DF	6	Alex Sandro		(substituted off) 64'
MF	5	Casemiro	(yellow card) 22'	(substituted off) 86'
MF	8	Arthur		(substituted off) 55'
MF	10	Lucas Paquetá		(substituted off) 46'
FW	19	Willian		(substituted off) 71'
FW	20	Roberto Firmino
FW	9	Gabriel Jesus		(substituted off) 71'
Substitutes:
MF	11	Philippe Coutinho		(substituted on) 46'
MF	17	Fabinho		(substituted on) 55'
DF	16	Renan Lodi		(substituted on) 64'
FW	7	Richarlison		(substituted on) 71'
FW	21	Rodrygo		(substituted on) 71'
FW	18	Wesley		(substituted on) 86'
Manager:
(Brazil) Tite

GK	23	Esteban Andrada
DF	2	Juan Foyth
DF	6	Germán Pezzella
DF	19	Nicolás Otamendi
DF	3	Nicolás Tagliafico	(yellow card) 61'
MF	11	Lucas Ocampos		(substituted off) 74'
MF	5	Leandro Paredes	(yellow card) 73'	(substituted off) 83'
MF	15	Rodrigo De Paul	(yellow card) 43'	(substituted off) 90'
MF	20	Giovani Lo Celso		(substituted off) 59'
FW	10	Lionel Messi
FW	22	Lautaro Martínez		(substituted off) 88'
Substitutes:
MF	8	Marcos Acuña		(substituted on) 59'
FW	24	Nicolás González		(substituted on) 74'
MF	18	Guido Rodríguez		(substituted on) 83'
FW	13	Lucas Alario		(substituted on) 88'
MF	17	Nicolás Domínguez		(substituted on) 90'
Manager:
(Argentina) Lionel Scaloni
