= 2017 Superclásico de las Américas =

- Event: Superclásico de las Américas
Brazil	Argentina
(Brazil)	(Argentina)
0	1
- Date: 9 June 2017
- Venue: Melbourne Cricket Ground, Melbourne
- Referee: Chris Beath (Australia)
- Attendance: 95,579

The 2017 Superclásico de las Américas – Copa Doctor Nicolás Leoz was the fourth edition of the Superclásico de las Américas, an annual friendly football match between the national teams of Argentina and Brazil. The match was played at the Melbourne Cricket Ground in Melbourne, Australia.

Argentina won the match by the solitary goal scored by Gabriel Mercado in the 45th minute of the first half, thus winning Superclásico de las Américas for the first time.

== Venue ==
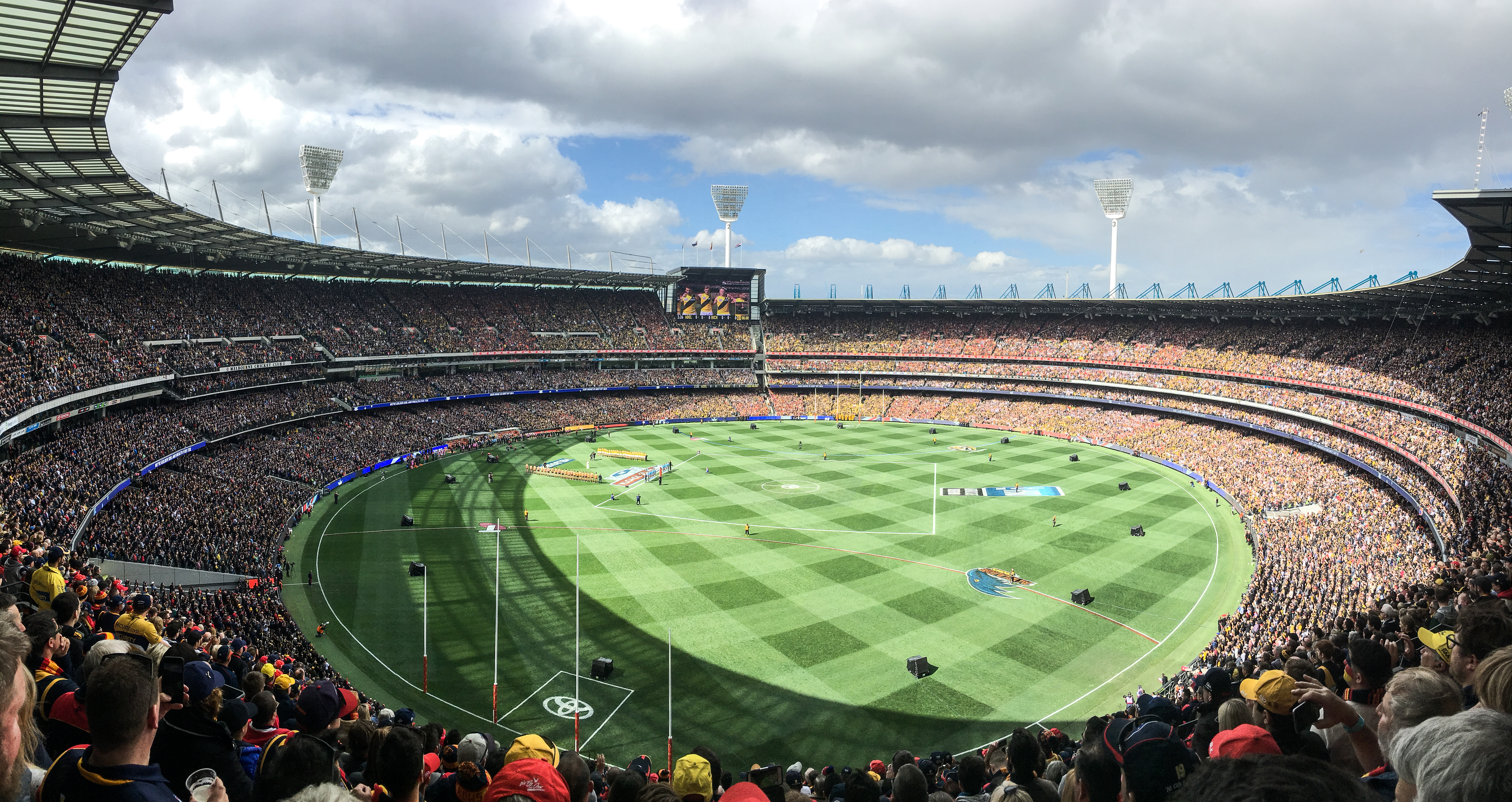
Melbourne Cricket Ground, venue of the match

== Match details ==
2017 Superclásico de las Américas
9 June 2017
20:05

Brazil	0–1	Argentina
	Report	Mercado 45'

Melbourne Cricket Ground, Melbourne
Attendance: 95,569
Referee: Chris Beath (Australia)

Brazil	Argentina

GK	1	Weverton
DF	2	Fagner		(substituted off) 73'
DF	3	Thiago Silva
DF	4	Gil
DF	6	Filipe Luís
MF	15	Paulinho	(yellow card) 78'	(substituted off) 81'
MF	5	Fernandinho
MF	8	Renato Augusto		(substituted off) 66'
FW	11	Philippe Coutinho
FW	9	Gabriel Jesus		(substituted off) 90+2'
FW	19	Willian
Substitutes:
FW	7	Douglas Costa		(substituted on) 66'
DF	18	Rafinha	(yellow card) 80'	(substituted on) 73'
MF	10	Giuliano		(substituted on) 81'
FW	17	Taison		(substituted on) 90+2'
Manager:
(Brazil) Tite

GK	1	Sergio Romero
DF	2	Gabriel Mercado		(substituted off) 75'
DF	17	Nicolás Otamendi
DF	4	Jonatan Maidana	(yellow card) 31'
MF	16	José Luis Gómez		(substituted off) 52'
MF	6	Lucas Biglia
MF	19	Éver Banega		(substituted off) 81'
MF	11	Ángel Di María		(substituted off) 90+4'
FW	10	Lionel Messi
FW	21	Paulo Dybala		(substituted off) 69'
FW	9	Gonzalo Higuaín		(substituted off) 46'
Substitutes:
MF	24	Joaquín Correa		(substituted on) 46'
DF	25	Nicolás Tagliafico		(substituted on) 52'
MF	27	Guido Rodríguez		(substituted on) 69'
DF	15	Emanuel Mammana		(substituted on) 75'
MF	20	Manuel Lanzini		(substituted on) 81'
MF	8	Marcos Acuña		(substituted on) 90+4'
Manager:
(Argentina) Jorge Sampaoli
