= 2018 Superclásico de las Américas =

- Event: Superclásico de las Américas
Argentina	Brazil
(Argentina)	(Brazil)
0	1
- Date: 16 October 2018
- Venue: King Abdullah Sports City, Jeddah
- Referee: Felix Brych (Germany)
- Attendance: 62,315

The 2018 Superclásico de las Américas – Copa Doctor Nicolás Leoz was the fifth edition of the Superclásico de las Américas, an annual friendly football match between the national teams of Argentina and Brazil. The match was played at the King Abdullah Sports City in Jeddah, Saudi Arabia, and was part of the larger friendly tournament 2018 Superclásico Championship.

Brazil won the game 1–0 with an injury time headed goal by Miranda, winning Superclásico de las Américas for the fourth time.

== Match ==
Brazil won the match by the solitary goal scored by Miranda in the third minute of second half's added time.

=== Details ===
2018 Superclásico de las Américas
16 October 2018
21:00 AST

Argentina	0–1	Brazil
	Report	Miranda 90+3'

King Abdullah Sports City, Jeddah
Attendance: 62,315
Referee: Felix Brych (Germany)

Argentina	Brazil

GK	1	Sergio Romero
DF	3	Nicolás Tagliafico		(substituted off) 82'
DF	6	Germán Pezzella
DF	17	Nicolás Otamendi
DF	26	Renzo Saravia	(yellow card) 69'
MF	5	Leandro Paredes	(yellow card) 18'
MF	20	Giovani Lo Celso	(yellow card) 64'	(substituted off) 73'
MF	30	Rodrigo Battaglia	(yellow card) 84'
FW	9	Mauro Icardi		(substituted off) 88'
FW	11	Ángel Correa	(yellow card) 62'	(substituted off) 67'
FW	21	Paulo Dybala		(substituted off) 58'
Substitutes:
FW	27	Lautaro Martínez		(substituted on) 58'
MF	7	Roberto Pereyra		(substituted on) 67'
MF	18	Eduardo Salvio		(substituted on) 73'
DF	8	Marcos Acuña		(substituted on) 82'
FW	19	Giovanni Simeone		(substituted on) 88'
Manager:
(Argentina) Lionel Scaloni

GK	1	Alisson
DF	2	Danilo		(substituted off) 53'
DF	3	Miranda	(yellow card) 71'
DF	13	Marquinhos
MF	16	Filipe Luís
MF	5	Casemiro
MF	11	Philippe Coutinho
MF	15	Arthur
FW	9	Gabriel Jesus		(substituted off) 65'
FW	10	Neymar	(yellow card) 66'
FW	20	Roberto Firmino
Substitutes:
DF	14	Fabinho		(substituted on) 53'
FW	7	Richarlison		(substituted on) 65'
Manager:
(Brazil) Tite
