= 2018 Superclásico Championship =

Tournament details
- Host country: Saudi Arabia
- Dates: 11–16 October
- Teams: 4 (from 2 confederations)
- Venues: 2 (in 2 host cities)

Final positions
- Champions: Brazil (1st title)
- Runners-up: Argentina
- Third place: Saudi Arabia
- Fourth place: Iraq

Tournament statistics
- Matches played: 4
- Goals scored: 9 (2.25 per match)
- Attendance: 118,764 (29,691 per match)
- Top scorer(s): Nine players (1 goal each)

The 2018 SuperClásico Championship was a four-team friendly international football tournament organised by the Saudi Ministry of Sport in Saudi Arabia. The national teams of Saudi Arabia, Iraq, Argentina and Brazil competed in matches played at Prince Faisal bin Fahd Stadium and King Saud University Stadium in Riyadh, and King Abdullah Stadium in Jeddah.

It was initially planned for Egypt to participate as the Arab competitor along with Saudi Arabia, but they later withdrew from the tournament due to scheduling conflicts; Iraq were thus invited in Egypt's place.

== Participants ==
- Argentina
- Brazil
- Iraq
- Saudi Arabia

== Format ==
The four teams each played two matches against one another during the October 2018 FIFA match window. The final match between Brazil and Argentina was also considered a part of the 2018 Superclásico de las Américas.

== Standings ==
| Pos | Team | Pld | W | D | L | GF | GA | GD | Pts |
|---|---|---|---|---|---|---|---|---|---|
| 1 | Brazil | 2 | 2 | 0 | 0 | 3 | 0 | +3 | 6 |
| 2 | Argentina | 2 | 1 | 0 | 1 | 4 | 1 | +3 | 3 |
| 3 | Saudi Arabia | 2 | 0 | 1 | 1 | 1 | 3 | −2 | 1 |
| 4 | Iraq | 2 | 0 | 1 | 1 | 1 | 5 | −4 | 1 |

Source: Goalzz

== Matches ==
11 October 2018
21:00 AST

| Iraq | 0–4 | Argentina |
|---|---|---|
| | Report | Martínez 18'; Pereyra 53'; Pezzella 82'; Cervi 90+1' |

Prince Faisal bin Fahd Stadium, Riyadh
Attendance: 18,517
Referee: Fahad Al-Mirdasi (Saudi Arabia)
12 October 2018
21:00 AST

| Saudi Arabia | 0–2 | Brazil |
|---|---|---|
| | Report | Gabriel Jesus 43'; Alex Sandro 90+6' |

King Saud University Stadium, Riyadh
Attendance: 23,401
Referee: Danny Makkelie (Netherlands)

15 October 2018
21:00 AST

| Saudi Arabia | 1–1 | Iraq |
|---|---|---|
| Al-Bishi 90+4' | Report | Ali 71' |

King Saud University Stadium, Riyadh
Attendance: 14,531
Referee: Peter Green (Australia)
16 October 2018
21:00 AST

| Brazil | 1–0 | Argentina |
|---|---|---|
| Miranda 90+3' | Report |

King Abdullah Sports City, Jeddah
Attendance: 62,315
Referee: Felix Brych (Germany)
