= 2016–17 Club Atlético River Plate season =

Club Atlético River Plate
2016–17 season
- President: Rodolfo D'Onofrio
- Manager: Marcelo Gallardo
- Stadium: Estadio Monumental Antonio Vespucio Liberti
- Primera División: 2nd
- Copa Argentina: Winners
- Copa Libertadores: Semi-finals
- Biggest win: River 4–1 Banfield; River 4–1 Temperley
- Biggest defeat: River 2–4 Boca
Home colours	Away colours	Third colours

The 2016–17 season is Club Atlético River Plate's 6th consecutive season in the top-flight of Argentine football. The season covers the period from 1 July 2016 to 30 June 2017.

== Season events ==
On June 29, Luciano Lollo signed a 4 years contract with River Plate, after the club bought him from Racing Club. The transfer was made for U$S3.5M.

On June 30, Enrique Bologna signed a contract with River Plate after quitting Gimnasia y Esgrima.

On July 8, Iván Rossi became part of the squad. River bought the player from Banfield for U$S3M.

On August 3, Arturo Mina signed a four-year contract with River Plate. The club bought the 70% of the transfer for U$S2.47M.

On September 28, River Plate presented a new kit (the fourth released in 2016), featuring black as main color, with diagonal red and white stripes. The design is a tribute to Ángel Labruna, one of the club's greatest idols.

== Squad Summer ==
Note: Flags indicate national team as defined under FIFA eligibility rules; some limited exceptions apply. Players may hold more than one non-FIFA nationality.

No.	Pos.	Nation	Player
1	GK	ARG	Augusto Batalla
2	DF	ARG	Jonatan Maidana (Vice-Captain)
3	DF	ECU	Arturo Mina
4	DF	PAR	Jorge Moreira
5	MF	ARG	Nicolás Domingo
6	DF	ARG	Luciano Lollo
7	FW	URU	Rodrigo Mora (3rd Captain)
8	MF	ARG	Denis Rodríguez
9	FW	CHI	Marcelo Larrondo
10	MF	ARG	Pity Martínez
11	FW	ARG	Sebastián Driussi
13	FW	ARG	Lucas Alario
14	MF	ARG	Joaquin Arzura
16	MF	ARG	Exequiel Palacios

No.	Pos.	Nation	Player
18	MF	URU	Camilo Mayada
19	FW	URU	Ivan Alonso
20	DF	ARG	Milton Casco
21	MF	ARG	Iván Rossi
22	MF	ARG	Andrés D'Alessandro
23	MF	ARG	Leonardo Ponzio (Captain)
25	GK	ARG	Enrique Bologna
26	MF	ARG	Ignacio Fernandez
28	DF	ARG	Lucas Martínez Quarta
29	DF	ARG	Gonzalo Montiel
30	DF	ARG	Luis Olivera
31	GK	ARG	Maximiliano Velazco
35	MF	ARG	Tomas Andrade

== Squad Winter ==
Note: Flags indicate national team as defined under FIFA eligibility rules; some limited exceptions apply. Players may hold more than one non-FIFA nationality.

No.	Pos.	Nation	Player
1	GK	ARG	Augusto Batalla
2	DF	ARG	Jonatan Maidana (Vice-Captain)
3	DF	ECU	Arturo Mina
4	DF	PAR	Jorge Moreira
5	MF	ARG	Nicolás Domingo
6	DF	ARG	Luciano Lollo
7	FW	URU	Rodrigo Mora (3rd Captain)
8	MF	ARG	Denis Rodríguez
9	FW	CHI	Marcelo Larrondo
10	MF	ARG	Pity Martínez
11	FW	ARG	Sebastián Driussi
13	FW	ARG	Lucas Alario
14	MF	ARG	Joaquin Arzura
16	MF	ARG	Exequiel Palacios

No.	Pos.	Nation	Player
17	MF	ARG	Carlos Auzqui
18	MF	URU	Camilo Mayada
19	FW	URU	Ivan Alonso
20	DF	ARG	Milton Casco
21	MF	ARG	Iván Rossi
23	MF	ARG	Leonardo Ponzio (Captain)
25	GK	ARG	Enrique Bologna
26	MF	ARG	Ignacio Fernandez
28	DF	ARG	Lucas Martínez Quarta
29	DF	ARG	Gonzalo Montiel
30	DF	ARG	Luis Olivera
31	GK	ARG	Maximiliano Velazco
32	MF	ARG	Ariel Rojas
35	MF	ARG	Tomas Andrade

== Transfers ==
=== In Summer ===
Number	Pos.	Name	From
3	DF	(Ecuador) Arturo Mina	(Ecuador) Independiente del Valle
4	DF	(Paraguay) Jorge Moreira	(Paraguay) Club Libertad
6	DF	(Argentina) Luciano Lollo	(Argentina) Racing Club
9	FW	(Chile) Marcelo Larrondo	(Argentina) Rosario Central
21	MF	(Argentina) Iván Rossi	(Argentina) Club Atlético Banfield

=== Out Summer ===
Number	Pos.	Name	To
1	GK	(Argentina) Marcelo Barovero	(Mexico) Club Necaxa
3	DF	(Colombia) Eder Alvarez Balanta	(Switzerland) FC Basel
15	MF	(Argentina) Leonardo Pisculichi	(Brazil) Esporte Clube Vitoria
17	MF	(Uruguay) Tabare Viudez	(Uruguay) Club Nacional de Football
21	DF	(Argentina) Leonel Vangioni	(Italy) AC Milan
24	DF	(Argentina) Emanuel Mammana	(France) Olympique Lyon
25	DF	(Argentina) Gabriel Mercado	(Spain) Sevilla Fútbol Club
27	MF	(Argentina) Lucho González	(Brazil) Atlético Paranaense
33	GK	(Argentina) Julio Chiarini	(Argentina) Club Atlético Sarmiento
	MF	(Argentina) Guido Rodríguez	(Mexico) Club Tijuana
	MF	(Argentina) Ezequiel Cirigliano	(Argentina) Atletico Tucuman
	MF	(Argentina) Tomas Martinez	(Portugal) Sporting Braga
	FW	(Argentina) Lucas Boyé	(Italy) Torino FC
	FW	(Argentina) Giovanni Simeone	(Italy) Genoa

=== In Winter ===
Number	Pos.	Name	From
17	MF	(Argentina) Carlos Auzqui	(Argentina) Estudiantes de la Plata
32	MF	(Argentina) Ariel Rojas	(Mexico) Cruz Azul

=== Out Winter ===
Number	Pos.	Name	To
22	MF	(Argentina) Andrés D'Alessandro	(Brazil) SC Internacional

=== Loan In ===
Number	Pos.	Name	From
8	MF	(Argentina) Denis Rodríguez	(Argentina) Newell's Old Boys

=== Loan Out ===
Number	Pos.	Name	From
8	MF	(Argentina) Nicolás Bertolo	(Argentina) Club Atlético Banfield

== Primera División ==
=== League table ===
Pos	Team	Pld	W	D	L	GF	GA	GD	Pts	Qualification
1	Boca Juniors (C)	30	18	9	3	62	25	+37	63	Qualification for Copa Libertadores group stage
2	River Plate	30	16	8	6	51	28	+23	56	Qualification for Copa Libertadores group stage
3	Estudiantes (LP)	30	16	8	6	46	26	+20	56	Qualification for Copa Libertadores group stage
4	Racing	30	17	4	9	51	40	+11	55	Qualification for Copa Libertadores group stage
5	Banfield	30	17	3	10	42	35	+7	54	Qualification for Copa Libertadores second stage

Source: AFA
(C) Champions

== Copa Argentina ==
Win Draw Loss

== Copa Libertadores ==
Win Draw Loss

=== Group 3 ===
Pos	Team	Pld	W	D	L	GF	GA	GD	Pts	Qualification
1	(Argentina) River Plate	6	4	1	1	14	9	+5	13	Round of 16
2	(Ecuador) Emelec	6	3	1	2	8	5	+3	10	Round of 16
3	(Colombia) Independiente Medellín	6	3	0	3	8	8	0	9	Copa Sudamericana
4	(Peru) Melgar	6	1	0	5	6	14	−8	3	

Source: CONMEBOL

15 March 2017 Round 1	Independiente Medellín (Colombia)	1–3	(Argentina) River Plate	Medellín, Colombia
19:00 UTC−5	Quintero 88' (pen.)	Report	Alario 29' (pen.); Driussi 33'; Martínez Quarta 51'	Stadium: Estadio Atanasio Girardot; Attendance: 40,482; Referee: Wilton Sampaio (Brazil)

13 April 2017 Round 2	River Plate (Argentina)	4–2	(Peru) Melgar	Buenos Aires, Argentina
21:00 UTC−3	I. Fernández 17'; Driussi 21', 66'; Martínez Quarta 26'	Report	Herrera 4', 24'	Stadium: El Monumental; Attendance: 35,000; Referee: Raúl Orosco (Bolivia)

27 April 2017 Round 3	Emelec (Ecuador)	1–2	(Argentina) River Plate	Guayaquil, Ecuador
19:00 UTC−5	Preciado 1'	Report	Moreira 41'; Alario 80'	Stadium: Estadio George Capwell; Attendance: 40,000; Referee: Roberto Tobar (Chile)

10 May 2017 Round 4	River Plate (Argentina)	1–1	(Ecuador) Emelec	Buenos Aires, Argentina
19:15 UTC−3	Mora 67' (pen.)	Report	Preciado 59'	Stadium: El Monumental; Attendance: 25,000; Referee: Anderson Daronco (Brazil)

18 May 2017 Round 5	Melgar (Peru)	2–3	(Argentina) River Plate	Arequipa, Peru
19:00 UTC−5	O. Fernández 23'; Herrera 61'	Report	Alario 11'; Mayada 19'; I. Fernández 69'	Stadium: Estadio de la UNSA, Arequipa; Attendance: 10,000; Referee: Jesús Valenzuela (Venezuela)

25 May 2017 Round 6	River Plate (Argentina)	1–2	(Colombia) Independiente Medellín	Buenos Aires, Argentina
19:30 UTC−3	Mina 82'	Report	Hernández 47'; Mosquera 55'	Stadium: El Monumental; Attendance: 45,000; Referee: Raphael Claus (Brazil)

=== Final stages ===
The 2017 Copa Libertadores final stages were played from 4 July to 29 November 2017. A total of 16 teams competed in the final stages to decide the champions of the 2017 Copa Libertadores.

This matches are listed on the article 2017-18 Club Atlético River Plate season.
