= 2017–18 Club Atlético River Plate season =

Club Atlético River Plate
2017–18 season
- President: Rodolfo D'Onofrio
- Manager: Marcelo Gallardo
- Stadium: Estadio Monumental Antonio Vespucio Liberti
- Primera División: 8th
- Copa Argentina: Winners
- Copa Libertadores: Semi-finals
- Top goalscorer: League: Ignacio Scocco (5 goals); All: Ignacio Scocco (15 goals)
- Biggest win: River 8–0 Wilstermann
- Biggest defeat: Talleres 4–0 River
Home colours	Away colours	Third colours

The 2017–18 season is Club Atlético River Plate's 7th consecutive season in the top-flight of Argentine football. The season covers the period from 1 July 2017 to 30 June 2018.

== Season events ==
On June 26, Germán Lux signed a 3-year contract after leaving Deportivo La Coruña. This was the return of the goalkeeper to the team where he started his career in 2001. He had left in 2007.

On June 30, the new signed players Germán Lux, Javier Pinola, Enzo Perez and Ignacio Scocco were officially presented in a press conference at the club's stadium.

On September 28, River Plate presented the new home kit for the 2017–18 season.

On October 11, River Plate released the new alternative kit, featuring red as main color.

On December 10, River won the 2016–17 Copa Argentina after defeating Atlético Tucumán in the final game played in Mendoza. This was the second title in a row for River Plate at this competition.

On January 9, Lucas Pratto signed a four-and-a-half-year contract with River Plate.

On January 11, Franco Armani signed a three-year contract with River Plate.

On January 24, Juan Quintero arrived at River Plate on a one-year loan from FC Porto.

On January 29, Bruno Zuculini signed a four-and-a-half-year contract with River Plate.

On January 31, Leonardo Ponzio extended his contract with River Plate until June 2019.

On February 14, River Plate released the new third kit, featuring vertical stripes of red black and white.

On March 6, the matches of the final stage of 2017–18 Copa Argentina were drawn. River Plate was paired with Central Norte from Salta.

On March 14, River Plate won the 2017 Supercopa Argentina after defeating Boca Juniors in Mendoza.

On March 16, it was announced a friendly match between River Plate and Universidad de Chile to be played in Santiago, on 24 March.

== Squad Summer ==
Note: Flags indicate national team as defined under FIFA eligibility rules; some limited exceptions apply. Players may hold more than one non-FIFA nationality.

No.	Pos.	Nation	Player
1	GK	ARG	Augusto Batalla
2	DF	ARG	Jonatan Maidana (Vice-Captain)
3	DF	URU	Marcelo Saracchi
4	DF	PAR	Jorge Moreira
5	DF	ARG	Alexander Barboza
6	DF	ARG	Luciano Lollo
7	FW	URU	Rodrigo Mora (3rd Captain)
8	MF	ARG	Denis Rodríguez
9	FW	CHI	Marcelo Larrondo
10	MF	ARG	Pity Martínez
11	MF	URU	Nicolás De La Cruz
14	GK	ARG	Germán Lux
15	MF	ARG	Exequiel Palacios
16	MF	ARG	Ariel Rojas

No.	Pos.	Nation	Player
17	MF	ARG	Carlos Auzqui
18	MF	URU	Camilo Mayada
19	FW	COL	Rafael Santos Borré
20	DF	ARG	Milton Casco
21	MF	ARG	Iván Rossi
22	DF	ARG	Javier Pinola
23	MF	ARG	Leonardo Ponzio (Captain)
24	MF	ARG	Enzo Perez
25	GK	ARG	Enrique Bologna
26	MF	ARG	Ignacio Fernández
28	DF	ARG	Lucas Martínez Quarta
29	DF	ARG	Gonzalo Montiel
32	FW	ARG	Ignacio Scocco
35	MF	ARG	Tomas Andrade

== Squad Winter ==
Note: Flags indicate national team as defined under FIFA eligibility rules; some limited exceptions apply. Players may hold more than one non-FIFA nationality.

No.	Pos.	Nation	Player
1	GK	ARG	Franco Armani
2	DF	ARG	Jonatan Maidana (Vice-Captain)
3	DF	URU	Marcelo Saracchi
4	DF	PAR	Jorge Moreira
5	MF	ARG	Bruno Zuculini
6	DF	ARG	Luciano Lollo
7	FW	URU	Rodrigo Mora (3rd Captain)
8	MF	COL	Juan Fernando Quintero
9	FW	CHI	Marcelo Larrondo
10	MF	ARG	Pity Martínez
11	MF	URU	Nicolás De La Cruz
14	GK	ARG	Germán Lux
15	MF	ARG	Exequiel Palacios
16	MF	ARG	Ariel Rojas

No.	Pos.	Nation	Player
17	MF	ARG	Carlos Auzqui
18	MF	URU	Camilo Mayada
19	FW	COL	Rafael Santos Borré
20	DF	ARG	Milton Casco
21	MF	ARG	Iván Rossi
22	DF	ARG	Javier Pinola
23	MF	ARG	Leonardo Ponzio (Captain)
24	MF	ARG	Enzo Perez
25	GK	ARG	Enrique Bologna
26	MF	ARG	Ignacio Fernández
27	FW	ARG	Lucas Pratto
28	DF	ARG	Lucas Martínez Quarta
29	DF	ARG	Gonzalo Montiel
32	FW	ARG	Ignacio Scocco

== Transfers ==
=== In Summer ===
Number	Pos.	Name	From
3	DF	(Uruguay) Marcelo Saracchi	(Uruguay) Danubio Fútbol Club
5	DF	(Argentina) Alexander Barboza	(Argentina) Defensa y Justicia
11	MF	(Uruguay) Nicolás De La Cruz	(Uruguay) Liverpool FC
14	GK	(Argentina) Germán Lux	(Spain) Deportivo La Coruña
19	FW	(Colombia) Rafael Santos Borré	(Spain) Atlético de Madrid
22	DF	(Argentina) Javier Pinola	(Argentina) Rosario Central
24	MF	(Argentina) Enzo Pérez	(Spain) Valencia CF
32	FW	(Argentina) Ignacio Scocco	(Argentina) Newell's Old Boys

=== Out Summer ===
Number	Pos.	Name	To
3	DF	(Ecuador) Arturo Mina	(Turkey) Yeni Malatyaspor
5	MF	(Argentina) Nicolás Domingo	(Argentina) Club Atlético Independiente
11	FW	(Argentina) Sebastián Driussi	(Russia) Zenit
13	FW	(Argentina) Lucas Alario	(Germany) Bayer Leverkusen
19	FW	(Uruguay) Ivan Alonso	Retired
	MF	(Argentina) Augusto Solari	(Argentina) Racing Club

=== In Winter ===
Number	Pos.	Name	From
1	GK	(Argentina) Franco Armani	(Colombia) Atlético Nacional
5	MF	(Argentina) Bruno Zuculini	(Italy) Hellas Verona
8	MF	(Colombia) Juan Fernando Quintero	(Portugal) FC Porto
27	FW	(Argentina) Lucas Pratto	(Brazil) São Paulo

=== Out Winter ===
Number	Pos.	Name	To
8	MF	(Argentina) Denis Rodríguez	(Argentina) Newell's Old Boys

=== Loan Out ===
Number	Pos.	Name	From
1	GK	(Argentina) Augusto Batalla	(Argentina) Atletico Tucuman
5	DF	(Argentina) Alexander Barboza	(Argentina) Defensa y Justicia
14	MF	(Argentina) Joaquin Arzura	(Spain) Club Atlético Osasuna
30	DF	(Argentina) Luis Olivera	(Argentina) Club Atlético San Martín
31	GK	(Argentina) Maximiliano Velazco	(Argentina) Arsenal Fútbol Club
35	MF	(Argentina) Tomas Andrade	(Brazil) Atlético Mineiro

== Friendlies ==
Win Draw Loss

=== Winter pre-season ===
26 July 2017 Friendly	Orlando City (United States)	1–3	(Argentina) River Plate	Florida, United States
18:45	H. Barry	Report	I. Scocco; A. Barboza; L. Alario	Stadium: Orlando City Stadium

28 July 2017 Friendly	Montverde Academy (United States)	0–3	(Argentina) River Plate	Florida, United States
09:15		Report	I. Scocco; T. Andrade; D. Rodríguez	Stadium: Montverde Academy

28 July 2017 Friendly	Montverde Academy (United States)	4–3	(Argentina) River Plate	Florida, United States
18:45	F. Moumbagna; K. Mulinya (o.g.)	Report	I. Fernández; L. Alario; E. Pérez	Stadium: Montverde Academy

9 August 2017 Friendly	River Plate (Argentina)	2–0	(Argentina) Colegiales	Ezeiza, Argentina
	I. Scocco; E. Palacios	Report		Stadium: River Camp

=== Mid-season ===
2 September 2017 Friendly	Boca Juniors (Argentina)	1–0	(Argentina) River Plate	San Juan, Argentina
16:00	J. Benítez 25'	Report		Stadium: Estadio San Juan del Bicentenario

=== Summer pre-season ===
10 January 2018 Friendly	Miami United (United States)	1 – 5	(Argentina) River Plate	Miami, Florida
18.00 (UTC−05:00)	S.Shamar 2'	Summary	Borré 65' 80' 89'; G.Martínez 76'; E.Pérez 87'	Stadium: Riccardo Silva

14 January 2018 Friendly	Independiente Santa Fe (Colombia)	2 – 1	(Argentina) River Plate	Lauderhill, Florida
13.30 (UTC−05:00)	Tesillo 15'; Pajoy 30'	Summary	Scocco 72'	Stadium: Central Broward

21 January 2018 Friendly	Boca Juniors (Argentina)	0 – 1	(Argentina) River Plate	Mar del Plata, Argentina
22.10 (UTC−03:00)		Summary	Borré 41'	Stadium: José María Minella; Referee: Facundo Tello

=== Mid-season ===
24 March 2018 Friendly	Universidad de Chile	0 – 3	(Argentina) River Plate	Santiago, Chile
20:00 (UTC -03:00)		Report	De La Cruz 51' (pen.); Borré 83', 87'	Stadium: Estadio Nacional; Attendance: 20,893; Referee: Piero Maza Gómez (Chile)

== Primera División ==
=== League table ===
Pos	Team	Pld	W	D	L	GF	GA	GD	Pts	Qualification
6	Independiente	27	13	7	7	29	19	+10	46	Qualification for Copa Sudamericana first stage
7	Racing	27	13	6	8	46	32	+14	45	Qualification for Copa Sudamericana first stage
8	River Plate	27	13	6	8	39	26	+13	45	Qualification for Copa Libertadores group stage (Note: River Plate qualified for the Copa Libertadores group stage by winning the 2018 Copa Libertadores.)
9	Defensa y Justicia	27	13	5	9	41	34	+7	44	Qualification for Copa Sudamericana first stage
10	Unión	27	11	10	6	33	23	+10	43	Qualification for Copa Sudamericana first stage

Source: AFA
Rules for classification: 1) points; 2) play-off (only if needed to decide championship); 3) goal difference; 4) goals scored; 5) head-to-head points; 6) head-to-head goal difference; 7) head-to-head goals scored.

=== Results by matchday ===
Matchday	1	2	3	4	5	6	7	8	9	10	11	12	13	14	15	16	17	18	19	20	21	22	23	24	25	26	27
Ground	A	H	A	H	A	H	A	H	A	H	H	A	A	H	A	H	A	H	A	H	A	A	H	A	H	A	H
Result	W	W	W	D	D	D	L	L	L	W	L	L	L	W	L	D	L	D	W	W	W	W	W				
Position	9	3	2	2	2	2	9	13	16	16	12	17	19	17	19	19	20	21	18	16	14	10	10				

Updated to match(es) played on 12 December 2017. Source: Soccerway
A = Away; H = Home; W = Win; D = Draw; L = Loss

27 August 2017 1	Temperley	0–1	River Plate	Turdera, Buenos Aires
20:05		Report	I. Scocco 32'	Stadium: Estadio Alfredo Beranger; Referee: Fernando Rapallini (Argentina)

10 September 2017 2	River Plate	3–1	Banfield	Buenos Aires
18:05	J. Pinola 18'; G. Martínez 43'; I. Scocco 73' (pen.)	Report	R. Civelli 2'	Stadium: Estadio Monumental Antonio Vespucio Liberti; Referee: Néstor Pitana (Argentina)

17 September 2017 3	San Martín	1–3	River Plate	San Juan, San Juan
20:05	C. Auzqui 39' (o.g.)	Report	R. Borré 4'; C. Auzqui 25'; A. Marcel 90+3'	Stadium: Estadio Ingeniero Hilario Sánchez; Referee: Fernando Echenique (Argentina)

24 September 2017 4	River Plate	1–1	Argentinos Juniors	Buenos Aires
18:05	G. Martínez 18' (pen.)	Report	N. González 37'	Stadium: Estadio Monumental Antonio Vespucio Liberti; Referee: Diego Abal (Argentina)

1 October 2017 5	Tigre	1–1	River Plate	Victoria, Buenos Aires
20:05	L. Janson 35'	Report	I. Scocco 10' (pen.)	Stadium: Estadio José Dellagiovanna; Referee: Ariel Penel (Argentina)

15 October 2017 6	River Plate	2–2	Atlético Tucumán	Buenos Aires
18:05	M. Casco 50'; R. Borré 53'	Report	L. Rodríguez 65'; I. Blanco 74'	Stadium: Estadio Monumental Antonio Vespucio Liberti; Referee: Federico Beligoy (Argentina)

28 October 2017 7	Talleres	4–0	River Plate	Córdoba, Córdoba
20:20	J. Ramírez 44', 69'; M. Torres 78'; L. Olaza 81' (pen.)	Report		Stadium: Estadio Mario Alberto Kempes; Referee: Hernán Mastrángelo (Argentina)

5 November 2017 8	River Plate	1–2	Boca Juniors	Buenos Aires
18:05	L. Ponzio 69'	Report	E. Cardona 42'; N. Nández 73'	Stadium: Estadio Monumental Antonio Vespucio Liberti; Referee: Néstor Pitana (Argentina)

19 November 2017 9	Independiente	1–0	River Plate	Avellaneda, Buenos Aires
21:30	N. Domingo 82'	Report		Stadium: Estadio Libertadores de América; Referee: Silvio Trucco (Argentina)

22 November 2017 10	River Plate	2–0	Unión Santa Fe	Buenos Aires
19:15	R. Borré 67'; G. Martínez 74' (pen.)	Report		Stadium: Estadio Monumental Antonio Vespucio Liberti; Referee: Patricio Loustau (Argentina)

26 November 2017 11	River Plate	1–3	Newell's Old Boys	Buenos Aires
19:15	G. Martínez 67'	Report	L. Leal 73'; B. Sarmiento 80' (pen.); H. Fértoli 85'	Stadium: Estadio Monumental Antonio Vespucio Liberti; Referee: Facundo Tello (Argentina)

3 December 2017 12	Gimnasia y Esgrima	2–1	River Plate	La Plata, Buenos Aires
21:30	N. Colazo 52'; B. Alemán 90+2'	Report	I. Scocco 78'	Stadium: Estadio Juan Carmelo Zerillo; Referee: Fernando Espinoza (Argentina)

28 January 2018 13	Huracán	1–0	River Plate	Buenos Aires
21.10 (UTC−03:00)	Pussetto 29' (pen.)	Report		Stadium: Tomás Adolfo Ducó; Referee: Germán Delfino

3 February 2018 14	River Plate	2–0	Olimpo	Buenos Aires
21.10 (UTC−03:00)	Scocco 56' (f.k.), 82'	Report		Stadium: El Monumental; Referee: Darío Herrera

11 February 2018 15	Lanús	1 – 0	River Plate	Lanús, Buenos Aires
21.30 (UTC−03:00)	Silva 56'	Report		Stadium: Ciudad de Lanús; Referee: Federico Beligoy

18 February 2018 16	River Plate	2 – 2	Godoy Cruz	Buenos Aires
19.15 (UTC−03:00)	Mora 38'; Pratto 51'	Report	Garro 17'; García 25'	Stadium: El Monumental; Referee: Jorge Baliño

24 February 2018 17	Vélez Sarsfield	1 – 0	River Plate	Buenos Aires
19.15 (UTC−03:00)	Robertone 70'	Report		Stadium: José Amalfitani; Attendance: 15,000; Referee: Mauro Vigliano

4 March 2018 18	River Plate	1 – 1	Chacarita Juniors	Buenos Aires
19.15 (UTC−03:00)	Scocco 43' (pen.)	Report	Menéndez 45+1'	Stadium: El Monumental; Referee: Hernán Mastrangelo

10 March 2018 19	Patronato	0 – 1	River Plate	Paraná, Entre Ríos
21.30 (UTC−03:00)		Report	Balboa 90+3' (o.g.)	Stadium: Bartolomé Grella; Referee: Andrés Merlos

18 March 2018 20	River Plate	3 – 1	Belgrano	Buenos Aires
20.00 (UTC−03:00)	G. Martínez 2'; Scocco 78', 87'	Report	García 54'	Stadium: El Monumental; Referee: Diego Abal

1 April 2018 21	Defensa y Justicia	1 – 3	River Plate	Florencio Varela, Buenos Aires
11.00 (UTC−03:00)	Márquez 11'	Report	Martínez 31' (pen.); Pinola 45+1'; Pratto 54'	Stadium: Norberto Tomaghello; Referee: Néstor Pitana

8 April 2018 22	Racing Club	0 – 2	River Plate	Avellaneda, Buenos Aires
		Report	R. Borré 77'; Palacios 90'	Stadium: Juan Domingo Perón; Attendance: 42,000; Referee: Patricio Loustau

15 April 2018 23	River Plate	2 – 0	Rosario Central	Buenos Aires
17.45 (UTC−03:00)	R. Borré 74'; Pratto 77'	Report		Stadium: El Monumental; Attendance: 56,000; Referee: Fernando Rapallini

22 April 2018 24	Arsenal	v	River Plate	Sarandí, Buenos Aires
				Stadium: Julio Humberto Grondona

29 April 2018 25	River Plate	v	Estudiantes	Buenos Aires
				Stadium: El Monumental

7 May 2018 26	Colón	v	River Plate	Santa Fe, Santa Fe
				Stadium: B.G. Estanislao López

12 May 2018 27	River Plate	v	San Lorenzo	Buenos Aires
				Stadium: El Monumental

== 2016–17 Copa Argentina ==
Win Draw Loss

15 August 2017 R64	River Plate (Argentina)	3–0	(Argentina) Atlas	Salta, Argentina
21:10	G. Martínez 12', 90+1' (pen.); I. Fernández 12'	Report		Stadium: Estadio Padre Ernesto Martearena; Referee: Ariel Penel (Argentina)

20 August 2017 R32	River Plate (Argentina)	4–1	(Argentina) Instituto	Mar del Plata, Argentina
21:10	L. Alario 45+2'; E. Pérez 66'; J. Maidana 84'; R. Borré 85'	Report	F. Olego 82'	Stadium: Estadio José María Minella; Referee: Jorge Baliño (Argentina)

7 October 2017 R16	River Plate (Argentina)	3–0	(Argentina) Defensa y Justicia	Formosa, Argentina
19:00	I. Scocco 11' (pen.), 87'; E. Palacios 87'	Report		Stadium: Estadio Antonio Romero; Referee: Silvio Trucco (Argentina)

18 October 2017 QF	River Plate (Argentina)	4–1	(Argentina) Atlanta	San Juan, Argentina
21:10	M. Saracchi 44'; I. Fernández 45'; G. Martínez 76'; C. Auzqui 84'	Report	A. Martínez 82'	Stadium: Estadio San Juan del Bicentenario; Referee: Germán Delfino (Argentina)

12 November 2017 SF	River Plate (Argentina)	3–0	(Argentina) Deportivo Morón	Mendoza, Argentina
20:30	I. Fernández 40'; J. Maidana 43'; R. Borré 90+1'	Report		Stadium: Estadio Malvinas Argentinas; Referee: Mauro Vigliano (Argentina)

9 December 2017 Final	River Plate (Argentina)	2–1	(Argentina) Atlético Tucumán	Mendoza, Argentina
19:15	I. Scocco 10'; I. Fernández 48'	Report	L. Rodríguez 12'	Stadium: Estadio Malvinas Argentinas; Referee: Fernando Rapallini (Argentina)

== 2017 Copa Libertadores ==
Win Draw Loss

=== Round of 16 ===
4 July 2017 First leg	Guaraní (Paraguay)	0–2	(Argentina) River Plate	Asunción, Paraguay
21:45		Report	I. Scocco 36'; M. Larrondo 87'	Stadium: Estadio Defensores del Chaco; Referee: Andrés Cunha (Uruguay)

8 August 2017 Second leg	River Plate (Argentina)	1–1 (agg: 3–1)	(Paraguay) Guaraní	Buenos Aires, Argentina
21:45	J. Pinola 51'	Report	M. Palau 45+1'	Stadium: Estadio Monumental Antonio Vespucio Liberti; Referee: Roddy Zambrano (Ecuador)

=== Quarter-finals ===
14 September 2017 First leg	Jorge Wilstermann (Bolivia)	3–0	(Argentina) River Plate	Cochabamba, Bolivia
21:45	E. Zenteno 5'; G. Álvarez 51'; C. Machado 82'	Report		Stadium: Estadio Félix Capriles; Referee: Sandro Ricci (Brazil)

21 September 2017 Second leg	River Plate (Argentina)	8–0 (agg: 8–3)	(Bolivia) Jorge Wilstermann	Buenos Aires, Argentina
19:15	I. Scocco 9', 14', 19', 46', 58'; E. Pérez 36', 67'; I. Fernández 53'	Report		Stadium: Estadio Monumental Antonio Vespucio Liberti; Referee: Julio Bascuñán (Chile)

=== Semi-finals ===
24 October 2017 First leg	River Plate (Argentina)	1–0	(Argentina) Lanús	Buenos Aires, Argentina
19:15	I. Scocco 82'	Report		Stadium: Estadio Monumental Antonio Vespucio Liberti; Referee: Wilton Sampaio (Brazil)

31 October 2017 Second leg	Lanús (Argentina)	4–2 (agg: 4–3)	(Argentina) River Plate	Lanús, Argentina
21:15	J. Sand 45+1', 46'; L. Acosta 62'; A. Silva 69' (pen.)	Report	I. Scocco 18' (pen.); G. Montiel 23'	Stadium: Estadio Ciudad de Lanús – Néstor Díaz Pérez; Referee: Wilmar Roldán (Colombia)

== 2018 Copa Libertadores ==
Win Draw Loss

=== Group stage ===
Pos	Team	Pld	W	D	L	GF	GA	GD	Pts	Qualification	RIV	FLA	SFE	EME
1	(Argentina) River Plate	6	3	3	0	6	3	+3	12	Round of 16	—	0–0	0–0	2–1
2	(Brazil) Flamengo	6	2	4	0	7	4	+3	10	Round of 16	2–2	—	1–1	2–0
3	(Colombia) Santa Fe	6	1	4	1	5	3	+2	7	Copa Sudamericana	0–1	0–0	—	1–1
4	(Ecuador) Emelec	6	0	1	5	3	11	−8	1		0–1	1–2	0–3	—

Source: CONMEBOL

28 February 2018 Round 1	Flamengo (Brazil)	2 – 2	(Argentina) River Plate	Rio de Janeiro, Brazil
21.45 (UTC−02:00)	Dourado 53' (pen.); Ribeiro 65'	Report	Mora 55'; Mayada 86'	Stadium: Olímpico Nilton Santos; Attendance: 0 Referee: Michael Espinoza (Peru)

5 April 2018 Round 2	River Plate (Argentina)	0 – 0	(Colombia) Santa Fe	Buenos Aires, Argentina
19:15 UTC−3		Report		Stadium: El Monumental; Attendance: 55,000

19 April 2018 Round 3	Emelec (Ecuador)	v	(Argentina) River Plate	Guayaquil, Ecuador
19:30 UTC−5		Report		Stadium: Estadio George Capwell

26 April 2018 Round 4	River Plate (Argentina)	v	(Ecuador) Emelec	Buenos Aires, Argentina
19:15 UTC−3		Report		Stadium: El Monumental

3 May 2018 Round 5	Santa Fe (Colombia)	v	(Argentina) River Plate	Bogotá, Colombia
19:30 UTC−5		Report		Stadium: Estadio El Campín

23 May 2018 Round 6	River Plate (Argentina)	v	(Brazil) Flamengo	Buenos Aires, Argentina
21:45 UTC−3		Report		Stadium: El Monumental

== 2017 Supercopa Argentina ==
14 March 2018 2017 SCA	Boca Juniors (Argentina)	0 – 2	(Argentina) River Plate	Mendoza, Argentina
21:10 UTC−3		Report	Martínez 18' (pen.); Scocco 70'	Stadium: Malvinas Argentinas; Attendance: 40,000; Referee: Patricio Loustau

== 2017–18 Copa Argentina ==
Win Draw Loss

TBD R64	River Plate	v	Central Norte	TBD
				Stadium: TBD
