= Ignacio Fernández (footballer) =

Argentine footballer (born 1990)

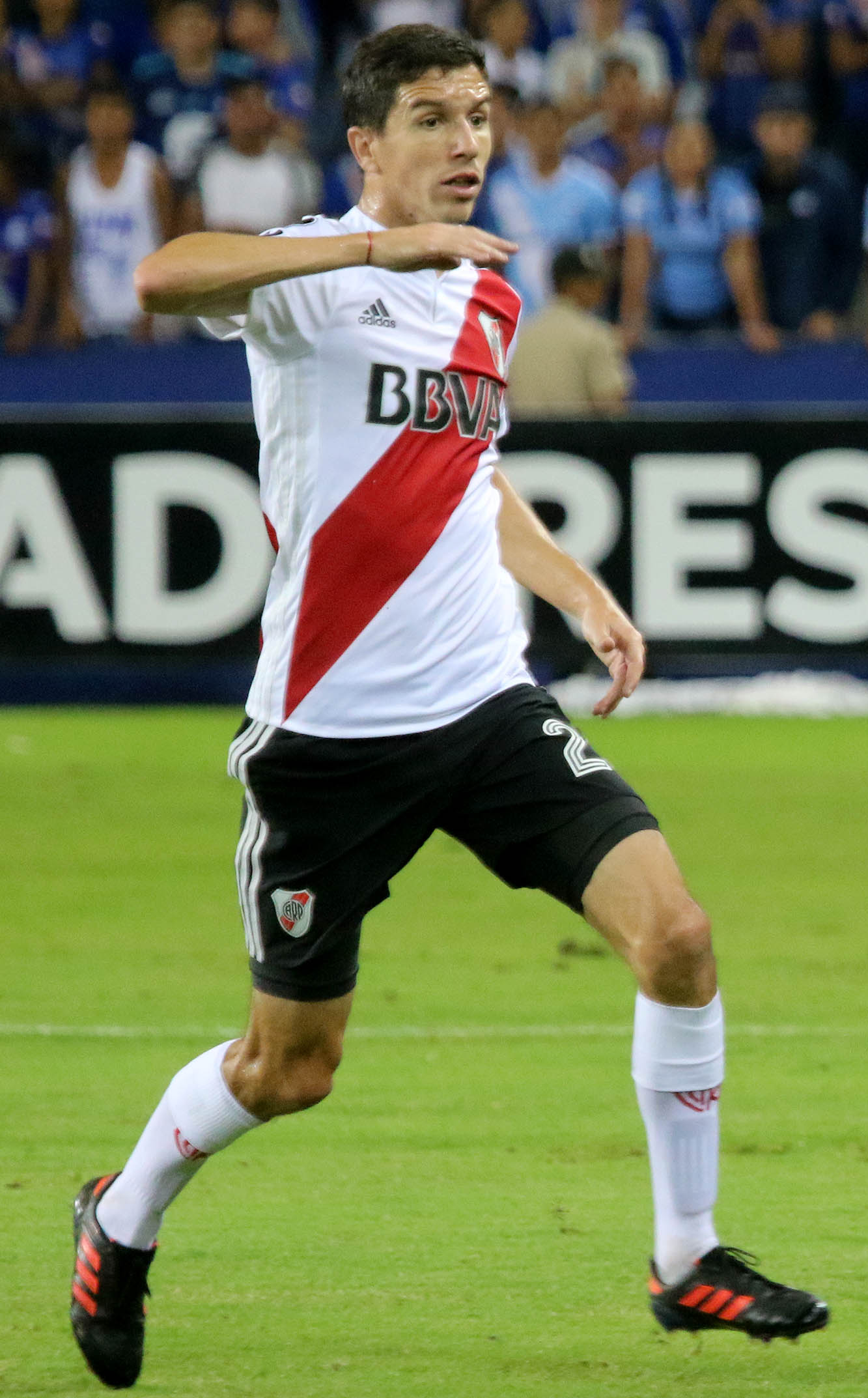
- Fernández playing for River Plate in 2018

Personal information
- Full name: Ignacio Martín Fernández
- Date of birth: 12 January 1990 (age 36)
- Place of birth: Castelli, Buenos Aires, Argentina
- Height: 1.82 m (6 ft 0 in)
- Position: Midfielder

Team information
- Current team: Gimnasia La Plata
- Number: 8

Youth career
- Dudignac
- 2003–2010: Gimnasia La Plata

Senior career*
| Years | Team | Apps | (Gls) |
| 2010–2016 | Gimnasia La Plata | 109 | (16) |
| 2011–2012 | → Temperley (loan) | 29 | (9) |
| 2016–2021 | River Plate | 94 | (8) |
| 2021–2022 | Atlético Mineiro | 77 | (14) |
| 2023–2026 | River Plate | 89 | (10) |
| 2026– | Gimnasia La Plata | 16 | (2) |

International career^{‡}
| 2017 | Argentina | 1 | (0) |
- * Club domestic league appearances and goals as of 17:11, 9 July 2026 (UTC) ‡ National team caps and goals as of 5 January 2018

Ignacio Martín Fernández (Spanish pronunciation: [iɣˈnasjo feɾˈnandes]; born 12 January 1990), better known as Nacho Fernández, is an Argentine professional footballer who plays as a midfielder for Gimnasia La Plata in the Argentine Primera División.

== Club career ==
=== Early career ===
Born in Castelli, Buenos Aires Province, Fernández's first playing years were with Club Atlético y Social Dudignac. At the age of 13, he joined Gimnasia y Esgrima La Plata's youth ranks. He made his professional debut for El Lobo on 2 October 2010, in a 4–2 league defeat to Argentinos Juniors.

In 2011, Fernández was sent on a one-year loan to Temperley in the Primera B Metropolitana. He made 30 appearances, scored 10 goals and made eight assistances for the side during that season.

In 2012, Fernández returned to Gimnasia, then recently relegated to the Primera B Nacional. He promptly earned a spot in the starting lineup and contributed with three goals and eight assists to the club's return to the first division. On 17 August 2013, he scored his first Primera División goal, the last in a 3–1 win over Rosario Central.

Fernández was the top scorer of Gimnasia in the 2015 season, with nine goals.

=== River Plate ===
On 7 January 2016, Fernández joined River Plate on a four-and-a-half-year deal. Los Millonarios paid US$2.1 million for 70% of his economic rights. He made his debut on 24 January, in a preseason Superclásico which River won 1–0. Throughout the 2016 season, he established himself in Marcelo Gallardo's team, forming a midfield line alongside Leonardo Ponzio, Andrés D'Alessandro and Pity Martínez. In August, he started in both legs of the 2016 Recopa Sudamericana, the first competitive honour of his career. In December, he won with River the 2015–16 Copa Argentina.

On 9 December 2017, Fernández scored the winning goal in the 2016–17 Copa Argentina final against Atlético Tucumán, won 2–1 by River.

Fernández appeared in 12 of the 14 matches of River's campaign in the 2018 Copa Libertadores, including both legs of the final against Boca Juniors. In the second leg, he assisted Lucas Pratto's equalizing goal, which forced the contest into extra-time; River scored twice in the added 30 minutes and won the title, which had extra significance in the fact that it was the first time a Superclásico was contested in the final of a continental competition.

In 2019, Fernández was assigned the number 10 shirt. On 30 May, in his first match with the new number, he scored the opening goal in the second leg of the 2019 Recopa Sudamericana against Athletico Paranaense, which River won 3–1 on aggregate. On 13 December, he scored the second goal in the 2018–19 Copa Argentina final, a 3–0 triumph over Central Córdoba.

=== Atlético Mineiro ===
On 20 February 2021, Fernández joined Brazilian club Atlético Mineiro on a three-year deal. The transfer fee was a reported US$6 million, placing it as a joint-record signing for the club, alongside the deals for Yimmi Chará and Matías Zaracho. He made his debut on 19 March, in a 3–0 Campeonato Mineiro win over Coimbra; he opened the score, assisted the second goal for Igor Rabello and was fouled in the box, with Hulk scoring from the resulting penalty kick.

Fernández was one of the team's standout players for much of the season, playing in an attacking midfielder role behind center forward Hulk; his performances in the victorious state championship campaign earned him a nomination to the team of tournament. On 2 July, he scored twice in a 4–1 Série A win over Atlético Goianiense. On 14 October, he took part in all three goals of a 3–1 league win over Santos, scoring a brace and assisting a Nathan Silva header.

In the final stretch of the Série A and the Copa do Brasil, after facing a series of muscle injuries coupled with the consolidation of Diego Costa in the starting lineup, Fernández was restricted mainly to making second half appearances. Despite this, his overall contribution to Atlético's domestic treble winning season, with 10 goals and 11 assists in 52 games, earned him nominations to both the Prêmio Craque do Brasileirão and Bola de Prata awards.

=== Return to River Plate ===
On 22 December 2022, River Plate announced the return of Fernández to the club.

== International career ==
In May 2017, Fernández received his first call up to the Argentina national team. He made his international debut in a friendly win against Singapore on 13 June, coming off the bench in the 75th minute and assisting an Ángel Di María goal to complete the 6–0 score.

== Career statistics ==
As of match played 15 May 2024

Appearances and goals by club, season and competition
| Club | Season | League | | | Cup | | Continental | | Other | | Total | |
| Club | Season | Division | Apps | Goals | Apps | Goals | Apps | Goals | Apps | Goals | Apps | Goals |
|---|---|---|---|---|---|---|---|---|---|---|---|---|
| Gimnasia y Esgrima (LP) | 2010–11 | Argentine Primera División | 1 | 0 | — | | — | | — | | 1 | 0 |
| Gimnasia y Esgrima (LP) | 2012–13 | Primera B Nacional | 32 | 3 | 1 | 1 | — | | — | | 33 | 4 |
| Gimnasia y Esgrima (LP) | 2013–14 | Argentine Primera División | 28 | 2 | 1 | 0 | — | | — | | 29 | 2 |
| Gimnasia y Esgrima (LP) | 2014 | Argentine Primera División | 17 | 2 | 0 | 0 | 2 (Note: Appearances in Copa Sudamericana) | 0 | — | | 19 | 2 |
| Gimnasia y Esgrima (LP) | 2015 | Argentine Primera División | 31 | 9 | 3 | 0 | — | | — | | 34 | 9 |
| Gimnasia y Esgrima (LP) | Total | | 109 | 16 | 5 | 1 | 2 | 0 | 0 | 0 | 116 | 17 |
| Temperley (loan) | 2011–12 | Primera B Metropolitana | 29 | 9 | 1 | 1 | — | | — | | 30 | 10 |
| River Plate | 2016 | Argentine Primera División | 10 | 0 | 0 | 0 | 6 (Note: Appearances in Copa Libertadores) | 2 | 2 (Note: Appearances in Recopa Sudamericana) | 0 | 18 | 2 |
| River Plate | 2016–17 | Argentine Primera División | 26 | 0 | 1 | 1 | 11 | 3 | — | | 38 | 4 |
| River Plate | 2017–18 | Argentine Primera División | 21 | 1 | 3 | 1 | 12 | 0 | 1 (Note: Appearance in Supercopa Argentina) | 0 | 37 | 2 |
| River Plate | 2018–19 | Argentine Primera División | 19 | 2 | 6 | 1 | 13 | 3 | 8 (Note: Two appearances in FIFA Club World Cup, four appearances and one goal in Copa de la Superliga, two appearances and one goal in Recopa Sudamericana) | 2 | 46 | 8 |
| River Plate | 2019–20 | Argentine Primera División | 18 | 5 | — | | 10 | 3 | — | | 28 | 8 |
| River Plate | 2020 | Argentine Primera División | — | | — | | — | | 7 (Note: Appearances in Copa de la Liga Profesional) | 2 | 7 | 2 |
| River Plate | Total | | 94 | 8 | 10 | 3 | 52 | 11 | 18 | 4 | 174 | 26 |
| Atlético Mineiro | 2021 | Série A | 26 | 5 | 9 | 1 | 10 | 1 | 7 (Note: Appearances in Campeonato Mineiro) | 3 | 52 | 10 |
| Atlético Mineiro | 2022 | Série A | 34 | 4 | 2 | 0 | 10 | 2 | 11 (Note: Ten appearances and two goals in Campeonato Mineiro, one appearance and one goal in Supercopa do Brasil) | 3 | 57 | 9 |
| Atlético Mineiro | Total | | 60 | 9 | 11 | 1 | 20 | 3 | 18 | 6 | 109 | 19 |
| River Plate | 2023 | Argentine Primera División | 40 | 5 | 2 | 0 | 8 | 0 | — | | 50 | 5 |
| River Plate | 2024 | Argentine Primera División | 16 | 1 | 1 | 0 | 5 | 0 | 1 (Note: Appearance in Supercopa Argentina) | 0 | 23 | 1 |
| River Plate | Total | | 56 | 6 | 3 | 0 | 13 | 0 | 2 | 1 | 73 | 6 |
| Career totals | | | 348 | 48 | 30 | 6 | 87 | 14 | 38 | 11 | 502 | 78 |

== Honours ==
River Plate

- Copa Libertadores: 2018
- Recopa Sudamericana: 2016, 2019
- Argentine Primera División: 2023
- Copa Argentina: 2015–16, 2016–17, 2018–19
- Supercopa Argentina: 2017

Atlético Mineiro

- Série A: 2021
- Copa do Brasil: 2021
- Campeonato Mineiro: 2021, 2022
- Supercopa do Brasil: 2022

Individual

- Copa Libertadores Team of the Tournament: 2019
- Copa Argentina Team of the Tournament: 2015–16, 2016–17, 2018–19
- Copa Argentina Best Player: 2018–19
- South American Team of the Year: 2019, 2020
- IFFHS Men's CONMEBOL Team: 2021 (substitute)
- Best Central Midfielder in Brazil: 2021
- Campeonato Brasileiro Série A Team of the Tournament: 2021
- Bola de Prata: 2021
- Campeonato Mineiro Team of the Tournament: 2021
