= 2016 Recopa Sudamericana =

- Event: Recopa Sudamericana
| Santa Fe | River Plate |
| (Colombia) | (Argentina) |
| 1 | 2 |
- on aggregate

First leg
| Santa Fe | River Plate |
| 0 | 0 |
- Date: 18 August 2016
- Venue: Estadio El Campín, Bogotá
- Referee: Wilton Sampaio (Brazil)
- Attendance: 18,800

Second leg
| River Plate | Santa Fe |
| 2 | 1 |
- Date: 25 August 2016
- Venue: Estadio Monumental, Buenos Aires
- Referee: Víctor Carrillo (Peru)
- Attendance: 62,000

The 2016 Recopa Sudamericana was a football match played over two legs between River Plate of Argentina and Independiente Santa Fe of Colombia. The first leg was played at the Estadio El Campín, Bogotá on 18 August 2016 and the second leg was played on 25 August 2016 at the Estadio Monumental, Buenos Aires. The annual Recopa Sudamericana, it was contested between the winners of the Copa Libertadores and Copa Sudamericana. River Plate were the reigning champions, while Independiente Santa Fe were appearing in the competition for the first time.

The teams qualified for the competition by winning the Copa Libertadores and Copa Sudamericana. Independiente Santa Fe qualified by winning the 2015 Copa Sudamericana. They beat Argentinian team Huracán 3–1 on penalties after a scoreless two-legged final. River Plate won the 2015 Copa Libertadores beating Mexican team Tigres UANL 3–0 in the finals.

A crowd of 18,800 observed the first leg at the Estadio El Campín, which resulted in a goalless draw. Watched by a crowd of 62,000 at the Estadio Monumental, River Plate took an early lead in the opening half when Sebastián Driussi scored. They extended their lead in the second half courtesy of Lucas Alario. Horacio Salaberry pulled one back for Independiente Santa Fe, but they were unable to equalise before the end of the match. Thus, River Plate won the tie 2–1 on aggregate to secure their second Recopa Sudamericana.

== Background ==
The Recopa Sudamericana was founded in 1989 to determine the best team in South America. From 1989 to 1998, it was contested between the winners of the Copa Libertadores and the Supercopa Libertadores, until CONMEBOL discontinued the latter. The competition then entered a four-year hiatus, resuming with the introduction of another major secondary tournament, the Copa Sudamericana.

Independiente Santa Fe qualified for the match by winning the 2015 Copa Sudamericana. They beat Argentinian team Huracán 3–1 on penalties after a scoreless two-legged final, winning the competition for the first time. It was Independiente Santa Fe's first appearance in the Recopa Sudamericana.

River Plate qualified for the match as winners of the 2015 Copa Libertadores. They beat Mexican team Tigres UANL 3–0 in the finals to win their third Copa Libertadores. River Plate were the current holders of the Recopa Sudamericana, after beating fellow Argentine team San Lorenzo in the previous season's edition. It was their fourth appearance in the tournament.

River Plate's last game before the first leg was a 2–1 win against Sportivo Estudiantes in the 2015-16 Copa Argentina, which qualified them for the eighth-finals. Independiente Santa Fe played Atlético Huila in a 1–0 loss on 15 August corresponding to the 2016 Torneo Finalización. They had lined-up mostly substitutes for the match as they came from winning the Suruga Bank Championship days prior.

== First leg ==
=== Summary ===
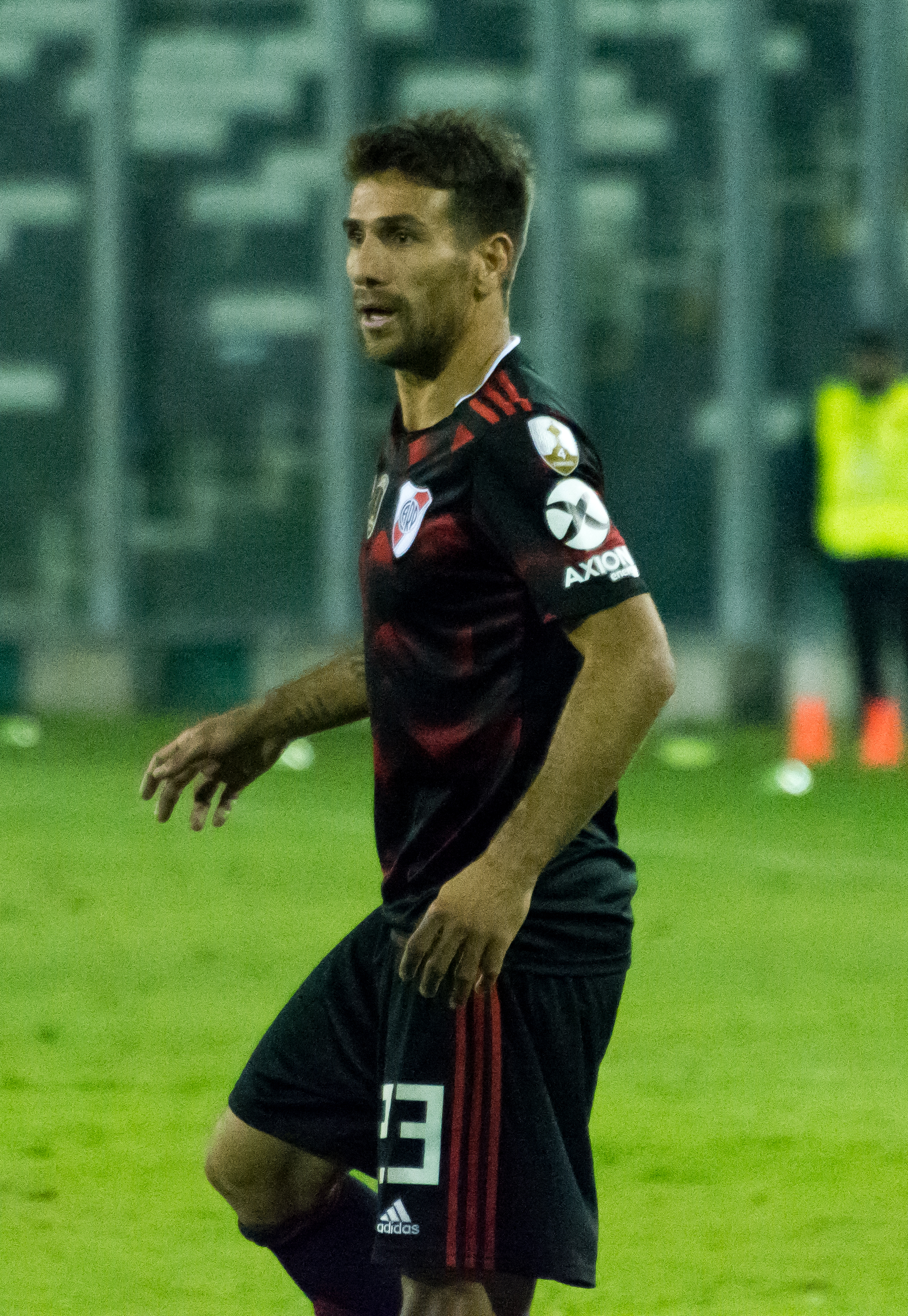
Leonardo Ponzio made a goal line clearance to prevent his team from a loss.

The first leg was held at the Estadio El Campín, the home ground of Independiente Santa Fe. They would have the opening chance of the match in the third minute, when a cutback after a run down the flank was cleared away by River Plate's Arturo Mina. Despite this, the visitors would dominate the game until the midway point of the half, as they showed authority in the midfield by quickly recovering possession and controlling the ball in the opposing half. Product of this dominance, Sebastián Driussi in the 16th minute and Gonzalo Martínez in the 21st unveiled shots on target that caused trouble to goalkeeper Róbinson Zapata, although he managed to stop both. At the 29-minute mark, a shot from Dairon Mosquera was stopped on the goal line by Leonardo Ponzio, stemming from an attempt at catching the ball by River Plate goalkeeper Augusto Batalla. Moments later, Argentine attacking midfielder Jonathan Gómez threatened the visitors once again, as he followed up on an individual play by taking a shot that went wide. Humberto Osorio and Mosquera had two last approaches to Batalla's goal, but the score remained for half-time.

The remaining 45 minutes of the game saw fewer opportunities. Independiente Santa Fe's first chance of the half occurred seven minutes in, when a shot aimed straight on target was blocked by Ecuadorian centre-back Mina. A later effort from Osorio in the 62nd minute also forced Batalla into a save. Lastly, Uruguayan defender Horacio Salaberry took a free kick that narrowly missed the River Plate net. The home side were more persistent than their opposition, but lacked the clarity to find spaces and create scoring prospects. During the closing minutes, the visitors seemed content with the draw, as they held on to ball possession. As a result, the first leg ended goalless.

=== Details ===
18 August 2016
19:45 UTC−5

| Santa Fe (Colombia) | 0–0 | (Argentina) River Plate |
|---|---|---|
| | Report |

Estadio El Campín, Bogotá
Attendance: 18,800
Referee: Wilton Sampaio (Brazil)

| Santa Fe | River Plate |

| GK | 1 | (Colombia) Róbinson Zapata |
| RB | 4 | (Colombia) Carlos Mario Arboleda |
| CB | 2 | (Uruguay) Horacio Salaberry |
| CB | 6 | (Colombia) William Tesillo |
| LB | 25 | (Colombia) Dairon Mosquera | (yellow card) 68' |
| RM | 17 | (Colombia) Juan Daniel Roa |
| DM | 3 | (Colombia) Yeison Gordillo | (yellow card) 45' |
| LM | 23 | (Colombia) Cristian Borja | | (substituted off) 58' |
| AM | 10 | (Argentina) Omar Pérez (c) | | (substituted off) 72' |
| CF | 24 | (Colombia) Humberto Osorio | | (substituted off) 85' |
| CF | 11 | (Argentina) Jonathan Gómez |
Substitutes:
| GK | 22 | (Colombia) Leandro Castellanos |
| DF | 19 | (Colombia) Javier López |
| DF | 5 | (Colombia) Yulián Anchico |
| MF | 14 | (Colombia) Baldomero Perlaza |
| MF | 20 | (Colombia) Kevin Salazar | | (substituted on) 85' |
| FW | 9 | (Venezuela) Juan Manuel Falcón | | (substituted on) 72' |
| FW | 21 | (Colombia) Joao Rodríguez | | (substituted on) 58' |
Manager:
(Argentina) Gustavo Costas

| GK | 1 | (Argentina) Augusto Batalla |
| RB | 4 | (Paraguay) Jorge Moreira |
| CB | 2 | (Argentina) Jonatan Maidana | (yellow card) 83' |
| CB | 3 | (Ecuador) Arturo Mina | (yellow card) 52' |
| LB | 20 | (Argentina) Milton Casco |
| CM | 23 | (Argentina) Leonardo Ponzio (c) |
| CM | 8 | (Argentina) Ignacio Fernández |
| AM | 22 | (Argentina) Andrés D'Alessandro | | (substituted off) 63' |
| AM | 10 | (Argentina) Gonzalo Martínez |
| CF | 11 | (Argentina) Sebastián Driussi | | (substituted off) 63' |
| CF | 13 | (Argentina) Lucas Alario | | (substituted off) 82' |
Substitutes:
| GK | 25 | (Argentina) Enrique Bologna |
| DF | 24 | (Argentina) Gonzalo Montiel |
| MF | 18 | (Uruguay) Camilo Mayada |
| MF | 5 | (Argentina) Nicolás Domingo |
| MF | 17 | (Argentina) Tomás Andrade | | (substituted on) 63' |
| FW | 7 | (Uruguay) Rodrigo Mora | | (substituted on) 63' |
| FW | 19 | (Uruguay) Iván Alonso | | (substituted on) 82' |
Manager:
(Argentina) Marcelo Gallardo

Assistant referees
Kléber Lúcio Gil (Brazil)
Bruno Boschilia (Brazil)
Fourth official
Raphael Claus (Brazil)

== Second leg ==
=== Summary ===
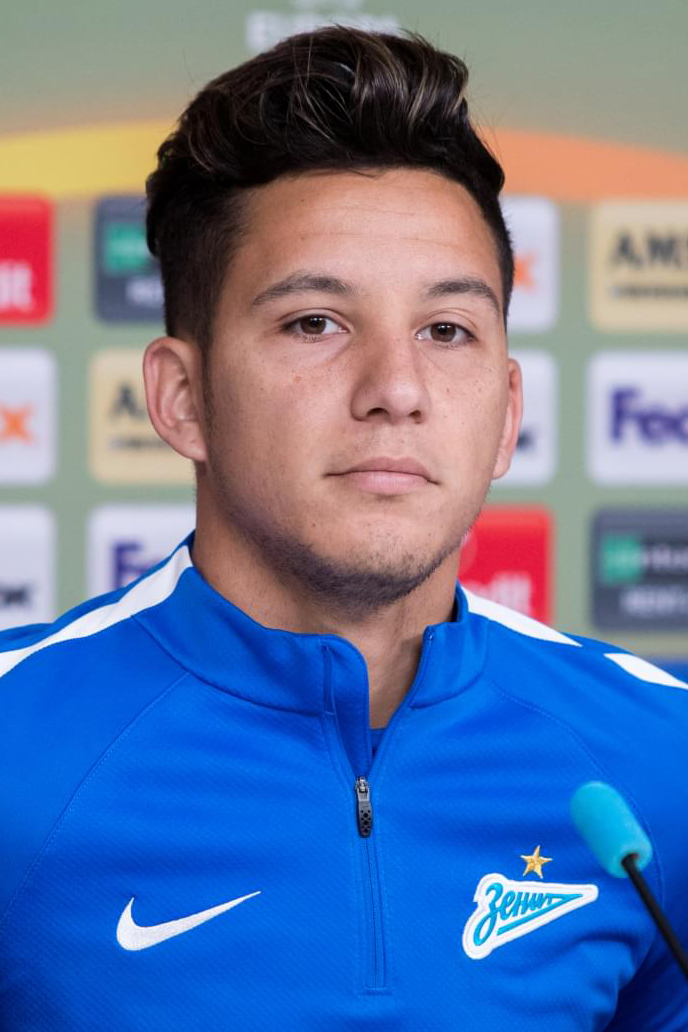
Sebastián Driussi scored the opening goal of the match.

At the Estadio Monumental, the home side pinned Independiente Santa Fe back against their goal from the first whistle. This aggressiveness paid off, as they opened the scoring early in the third minute. Following a free kick taken quickly by Ignacio Fernández, the ball reached Gonzalo Martínez, who from the left side sent a cross into the box for Sebastián Driussi, which the striker tapped in to put his team ahead. River Plate maintained control of the game once in the lead, although their opposition managed to threaten them. Independiente Santa Fe's first attempt at tying the game came courtesy of Humberto Osorio, whose shot went wide of the left post in the 11th minute. Midfielder Yeison Gordillo followed up at the 24-minute mark, as he unveiled a powerful strike that Augusto Batalla fended off. Close to the half-hour mark, Martínez had a shot deflected by Róbinson Zapata for the home team.

Six minutes after the restart, River Plate extended their lead. Andrés D'Alessandro sent a cross into the penalty area, where Jonatan Maidana was waiting. The defender then headed the ball over to Lucas Alario, who struck it into the goal. Even though the home side controlled possession, Independiente Santa Fe started to gradually trouble them with set pieces. In the 65th minute of play, one of them came to fruition. Following a free kick taken towards Osorio, the striker delivered the ball from the far post over to where Horacio Salaberry lurked. The centre-back, unmarked, pulled one back through a header to make it 2–1. Nine minutes later, a mistake in defense from the visitors left Martínez just outside of the 18-yard box. The midfielder proceeded to chip the ball over the goalkeeper, crashing it against the crossbar. Independiente Santa Fe persisted in their attempts to even the score through set plays, and in the 87th minute, Salaberry found himself with a chance to equalise, but his shot went high of the woodwork.

=== Details ===
25 August 2016
21:15 UTC−3

| River Plate (Argentina) | 2–1 | (Colombia) Santa Fe |
|---|---|---|
| Driussi 3'; Alario 51' | Report | Salaberry 65' |

Estadio Monumental, Buenos Aires
Attendance: 62,000
Referee: Víctor Carrillo (Peru)

| River Plate | Santa Fe |

| GK | 1 | (Argentina) Augusto Batalla |
| RB | 4 | (Paraguay) Jorge Moreira |
| CB | 2 | (Argentina) Jonatan Maidana |
| CB | 3 | (Ecuador) Arturo Mina |
| LB | 20 | (Argentina) Milton Casco | (yellow card) 10' |
| CM | 23 | (Argentina) Leonardo Ponzio (c) |
| CM | 8 | (Argentina) Ignacio Fernández |
| AM | 22 | (Argentina) Andrés D'Alessandro | | (substituted off) 70' |
| AM | 10 | (Argentina) Gonzalo Martínez | (yellow card) 75' | (substituted off) 80' |
| CF | 11 | (Argentina) Sebastián Driussi | | (substituted off) 70' |
| CF | 13 | (Argentina) Lucas Alario |
Substitutes:
| GK | 25 | (Argentina) Enrique Bologna |
| DF | 24 | (Argentina) Gonzalo Montiel |
| MF | 5 | (Argentina) Nicolás Domingo |
| MF | 17 | (Argentina) Tomás Andrade | | (substituted on) 70' |
| FW | 7 | (Uruguay) Rodrigo Mora | | (substituted on) 80' |
| FW | 9 | (Chile) Marcelo Larrondo |
| FW | 19 | (Uruguay) Iván Alonso | | (substituted on) 70' |
Manager:
(Argentina) Marcelo Gallardo

| GK | 1 | (Colombia) Róbinson Zapata |
| RB | 4 | (Colombia) Carlos Mario Arboleda |
| CB | 2 | (Uruguay) Horacio Salaberry |
| CB | 6 | (Colombia) William Tesillo |
| LB | 25 | (Colombia) Dairon Mosquera |
| RM | 8 | (Colombia) Leonardo Pico | | (substituted off) 60' |
| CM | 17 | (Colombia) Juan Daniel Roa |
| CM | 3 | (Colombia) Yeison Gordillo | (yellow card) 15' |
| LM | 10 | (Argentina) Omar Pérez (c) | | (substituted off) 46' |
| CF | 11 | (Argentina) Jonathan Gómez |
| CF | 24 | (Colombia) Humberto Osorio |
Substitutes:
| GK | 22 | (Colombia) Leandro Castellanos |
| DF | 19 | (Colombia) Javier López |
| DF | 7 | (Colombia) Leyvin Balanta |
| DF | 5 | (Colombia) Yulián Anchico |
| MF | 14 | (Colombia) Baldomero Perlaza |
| MF | 13 | (Colombia) Kevin Salazar | | (substituted on) 46' |
| FW | 9 | (Venezuela) Juan Manuel Falcón | (yellow card) 68' | (substituted on) 60' |
Manager:
(Argentina) Gustavo Costas

Assistant referees
Jonny Bossio (Peru)
Coty Carrera (Peru)
Fourth official
Miguel Santiváñez (Peru)

== Post-match ==
River Plate's Marcelo Gallardo was moved after the win: "This is incredible, it's exciting. One does not stop to think, it's been two very intense years." He also commented on the match: "We had a very good attitude in the face of adversity, because the Colombian team is tough [...] We played well in the first half, but we couldn't maintain our showing and we held on thanks to other factors".

Independiente Santa Fe's Argentine coach Gustavo Costas showed his disappointment after the loss: "We didn't get going in the first 20 minutes. We gave away 25 minutes like in Bogotá. It was hard for us to settle in." Nonetheless, he praised their display in the second half: "The team pressed forward with intensity. We were close to tying it."

River Plate finished the 2016 Argentine Primera División in ninth place of their group, failing to qualify for the play-offs of the league. Nonetheless, they secured a spot for the 2017 Copa Libertadores as winners of the 2015-16 Copa Argentina. Independiente Santa Fe were crowned champions of the 2016 Torneo Finalización. As a result, they were also qualified to play on the following season of the Copa Libertadores.

== See also ==
- 2017 Copa Libertadores
- 2017 Copa Sudamericana
- 2016-17 Club Atlético River Plate season
