= Gonzalo Montiel =

Argentine footballer (born 1997)

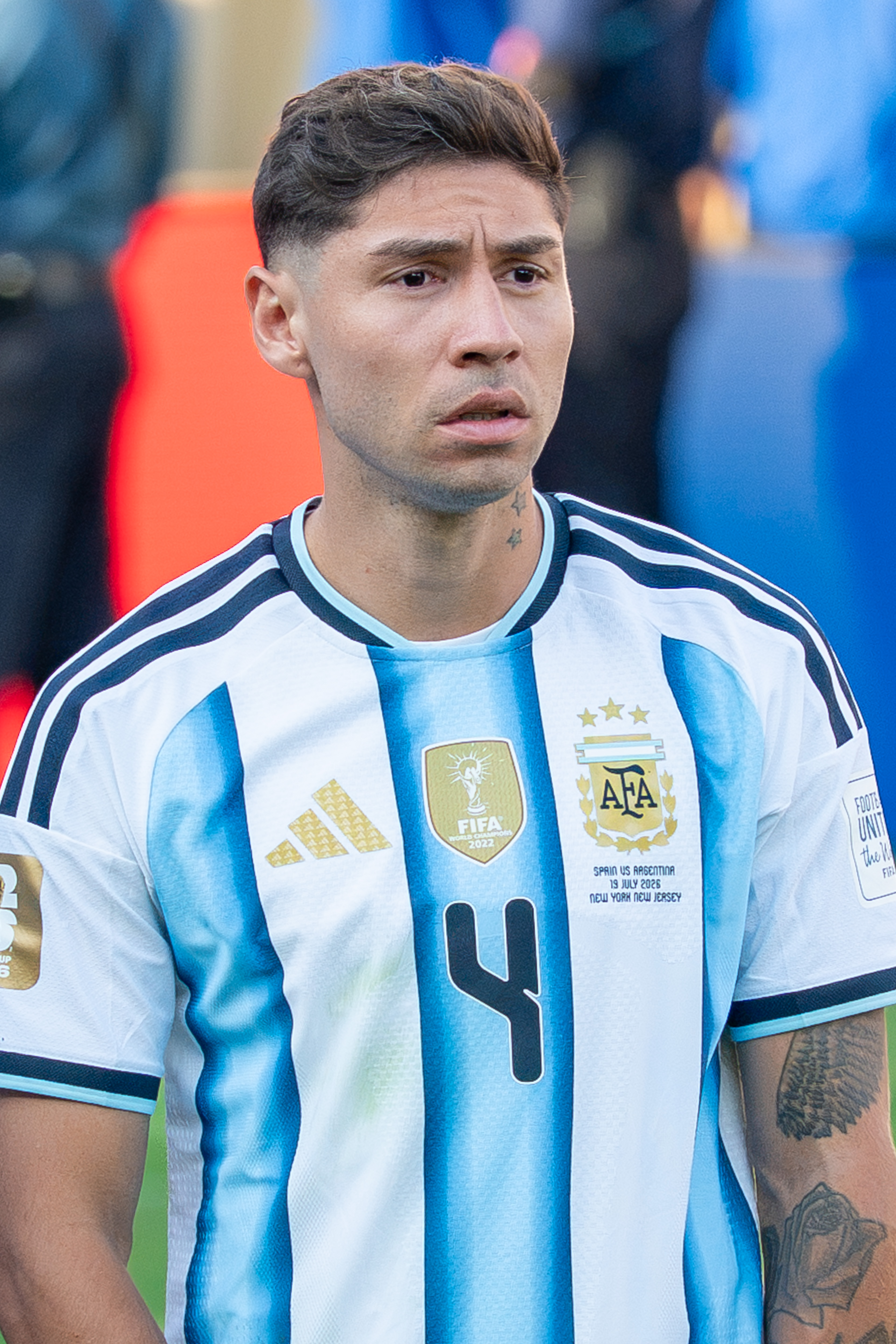
- Montiel with Argentina in 2026

Personal information
- Full name: Gonzalo Ariel Montiel
- Date of birth: 1 January 1997 (age 29)
- Place of birth: González Catán, Buenos Aires, Argentina
- Height: 1.75 m (5 ft 9 in)
- Position: Right-back

Team information
- Current team: River Plate
- Number: 29

Youth career
- River Plate

Senior career*
Years	Team	Apps	(Gls)
2016–2021	River Plate	72	(3)
2021–2025	Sevilla	52	(1)
2023–2024	→ Nottingham Forest (loan)	14	(0)
2025–	River Plate	52	(10)

International career^{‡}
2017	Argentina U20	2	(0)
2019–	Argentina	45	(2)
Medal record
Men's football
Representing Argentina
FIFA World Cup
Winner	2022 Qatar
Runner-up	2026 Canada–Mexico–US
Copa América
Winner	2021 Brazil
Winner	2024 United States
- * Club domestic league appearances and goals as of 21:22, 1 November 2026 (UTC) ‡ National team caps and goals as of 19 July 2026 (UTC)

Gonzalo Ariel Montiel (born 1 January 1997) is an Argentine professional footballer who plays as right-back for the Argentine Primera División club Atlético River Plate and the Argentina national team.

Montiel began his professional career with River Plate in 2016, playing 140 games and winning honours including the Argentine Primera División in 2021 and the Copa Libertadores in 2018. In 2021, he signed for Sevilla for €11 million, and was loaned to English side Nottingham Forest for the 2023–24 season before returning to Seville for another year. Then, four years after his departure from Argentina, Montiel returned in January 2025 to River Plate.

Montiel made his senior international debut for Argentina in 2019. He was a part of the squads that won the Copa América in 2021 and 2024 and the FIFA World Cup in 2022, scoring the winning penalty in the shoot-out of the latter final.

== Club career ==
=== River Plate ===
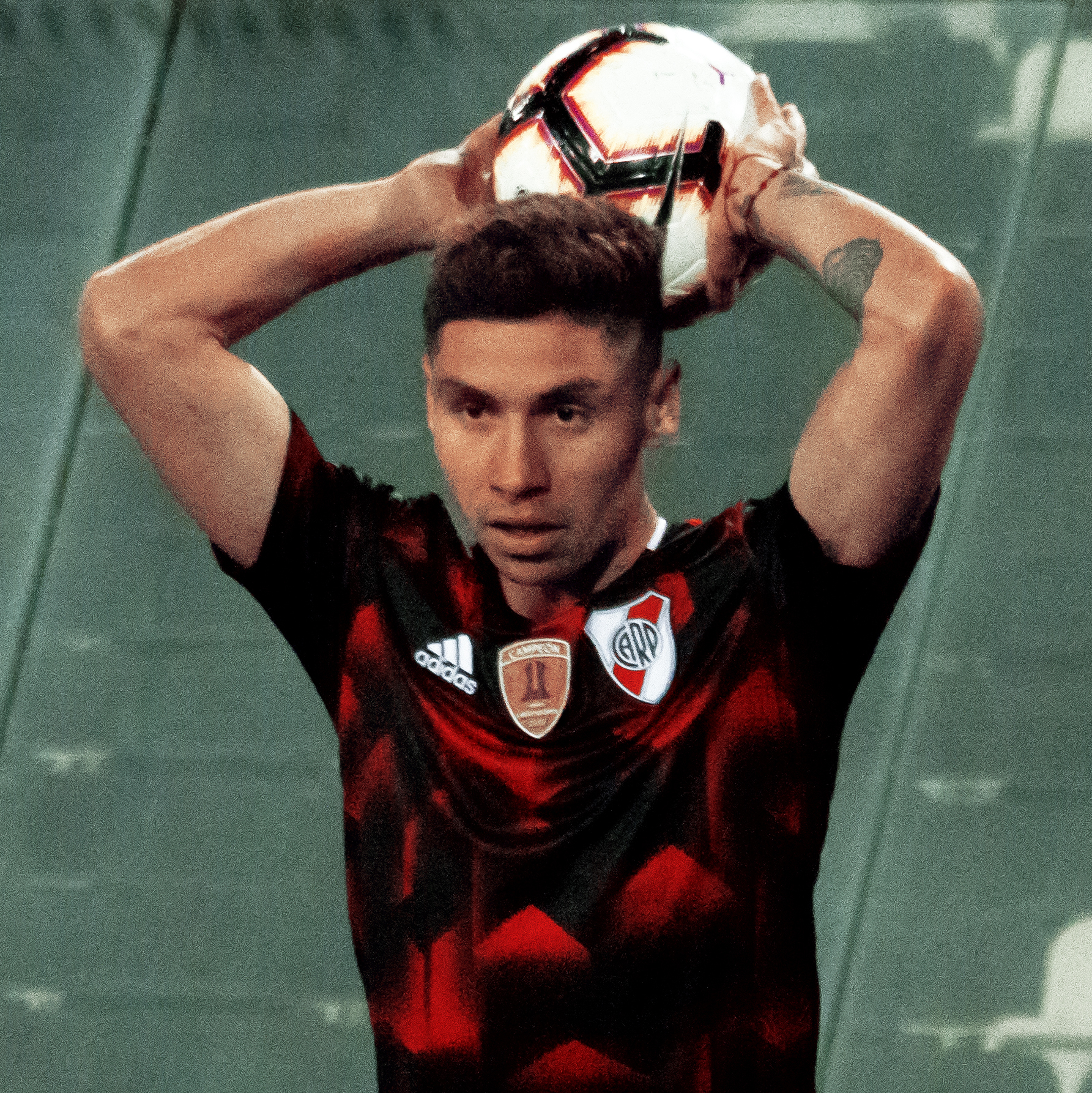
Montiel playing for River Plate in 2019

Born in González Catán, Buenos Aires Province, Montiel was a product of the Club Atlético River Plate academy. In October 2015, manager Marcelo Gallardo called the 18-year-old up for the first time for an Argentine Primera División game at Defensa y Justicia; he was unused in the 1–0 loss on 15 October. He made his debut on 30 April 2016 in his one appearance of that season, as a half-time substitute for Pablo Carreras in a goalless draw at home to Club Atlético Vélez Sarsfield; Gallardo had made 11 changes to his team with an eye to a Copa Libertadores second leg against C.S.D. Independiente del Valle.

Montiel played four league matches the 2016–17 season. On 30 October, he was sent off in a 2–2 draw at Arsenal de Sarandí. He lifted the Copa Argentina trophy after playing all the matches from the last 16 to the final, in which his team beat Atlético Tucumán. He played in the 2017 Copa Libertadores, scoring a goal and assisting three, playing every minute from the quarter-finals to the semi-finals, where River Plate were defeated by Club Atlético Lanús; his first career goal came on 1 November in a 4–2 loss at Lanús.

In the 2017–18 season, Montiel played 35 matches, fifteen of them coming in the league. He made 14 appearances he made as the team lifted the Copa Libertadores at the Santiago Bernabéu Stadium against Superclásico rivals Boca Juniors. Playing five matches in the Copa Argentina, the team were eliminated on penalties in the semi-finals against Club de Gimnasia y Esgrima La Plata. The team secured a double that season as they beat Boca in the Supercopa Argentina.

The following season, Montiel played 12 matches in the league without being substituted. For the second season in a row, Montiel reached the Copa Libertadores final after twelve matches; however, River Plate would be defeated by CR Flamengo. He won the Copa Argentina once more as River beat Central Córdoba - he played every minute in the cup run. After winning last season's Copa Libertadores, River contested the FIFA Club World Cup where they finished third. An injury prevented him from playing in the Super Cup. After recovering, he returned to contest the Recopa as River overcame a 1–0 first-leg defeat to win the trophy with a 3–0 win against Club Athletico Paranaense.

On 20 February 2021, Montiel scored his first league goal for River, a penalty in a 3–0 win against Rosario Central in the first game at the Estadio Monumental after a six-month renovation.

=== Sevilla ===
On 13 August 2021, La Liga club Sevilla FC signed Montiel on a five-year deal for €11 million. Manager Julen Lopetegui signed him to compete with club icon Jesús Navas at right back after the exit of Aleix Vidal. He made his debut on 14 September in a UEFA Champions League group stage 1–1 home draw against FC Red Bull Salzburg, replacing Navas for the last three minutes. Eight days later, he made his league bow by starting against Valencia CF at the Ramón Sánchez Pizjuán Stadium, scoring in the 15th minute of a 3–1 win before making way for Navas before the hour.

Montiel was sent off on 6 November 2022 in a 1–1 Seville derby draw at Real Betis for a 38th-minute foul on Álex Moreno. On 31 May 2023, he scored the winning penalty in the Europa League final against Roma in a 4–1 victory in the penalty shootouts after a 1–1 draw, which secured their seventh title in the competition.

==== Loan to Nottingham Forest ====
On 23 August 2023, Montiel signed for Premier League club Nottingham Forest on a season-long loan with the option to make the move permanent. He became the third Argentine in history to sign with the club.

==== Return to Sevilla ====
After one season in the Premier League, Montiel returned to Sevilla after completing his loan spell for Nottingham Forest after playing 802 minutes for the English team. Forest had shown interest in signing him permanently, as well as fellow English side Everton FC and the Dutch team Feyenoord, but ultimately Montiel returned to Spain.

=== Return to River Plate ===
During the European winter club transfer period, Montiel was sold from Seville in January 2025 to his former club River Plate for a fee of $4.5 million, with a potential extra $500,000 for performance based results. His contract is until December 2028. He returned to his first club where he made 140 appearances with 6 goals from his debut in 2016.

== International career ==
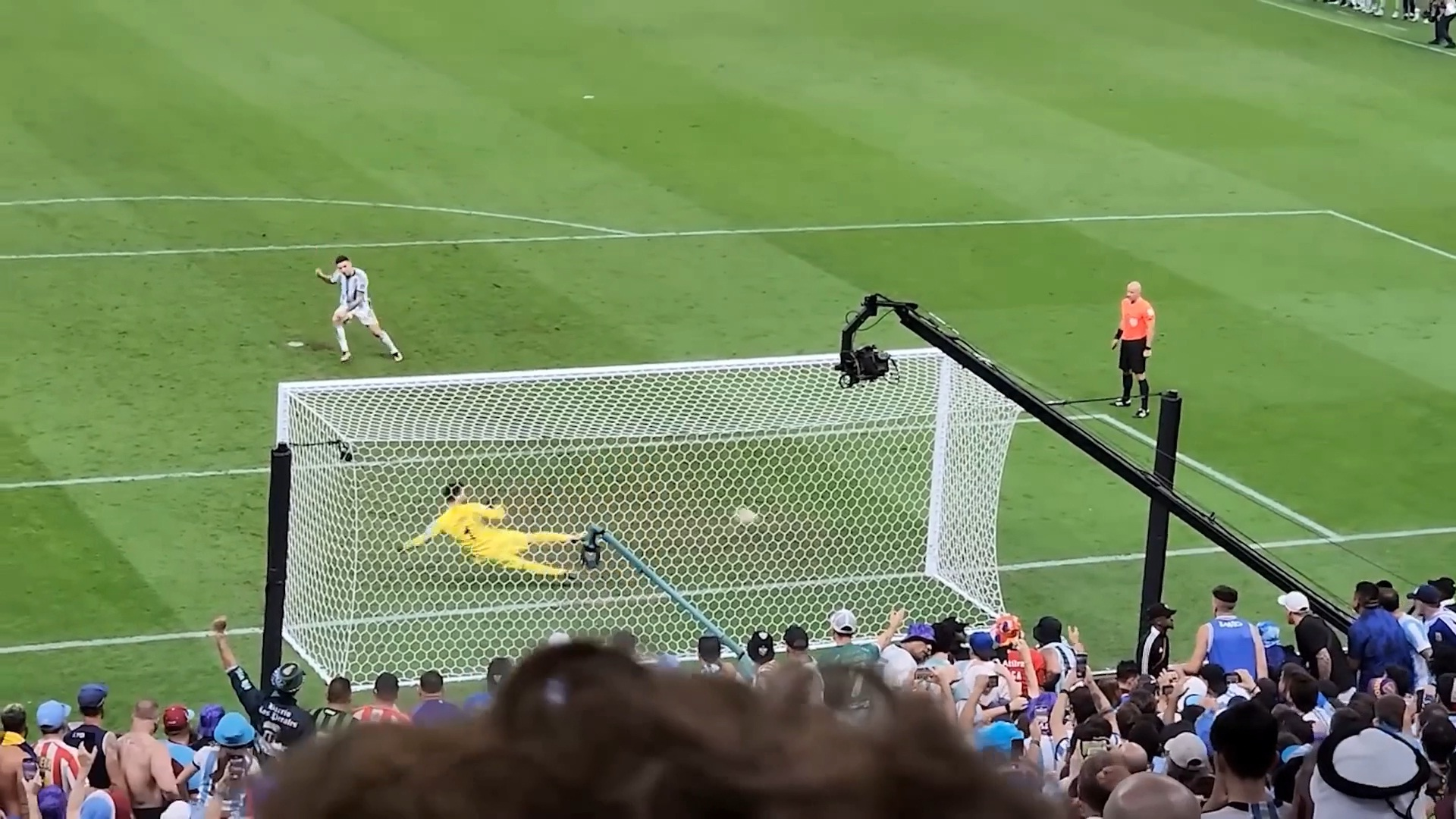
Montiel scoring the winning penalty against France in the 2022 FIFA World Cup Final

In March 2019, Argentina manager Lionel Scaloni called up Montiel as one of ten domestic-based players for friendlies against Venezuela and Morocco. He made his debut on 22 March against Venezuela at the Metropolitano Stadium in Madrid, playing the entirety of a 3–1 loss.

On 11 June 2021, Montiel was one of the 28-man squad announced by Argentina for the 2021 Copa América tournament. He played four of the seven matches played by the team in the tournament including the final victory, which he had to complete with a bleeding ankle as a result of a tackle from Fred in the first half of the game.

In November 2022, Montiel was named in the final squad for the 2022 FIFA World Cup in Qatar. During the tournament, he played against Mexico (as a starter, he was subbed out in the 63rd minute), Australia (subbed in at the 80th minute), the Netherlands (subbed in at the 106th minute, in extra time), and the final against France (when he was subbed in at the 91st minute). In the final, he conceded a penalty late in extra time after a handball. Kylian Mbappé then scored to make it 3-3, taking the final to a penalty shootout. After Kingsley Coman and Aurélien Tchouaméni missed their penalties, Montiel scored the tournament-winning penalty kick for Argentina in a 4–2 victory, ending the 36 year drought.

In June 2024, Montiel was included in Lionel Scaloni's final 26-man Argentina squad for the 2024 Copa América, also won by Argentina.

On 27 May 2026, Montiel was selected in the 26-man squad for the 2026 FIFA World Cup.

== Personal life ==
Montiel is from the Greater Buenos Aires area. His cousin, Santiago Montiel, is also a footballer.

=== Sexual abuse allegations ===
In June 2023, Mundo Deportivo reported that Argentine police had charged Montiel with sexual abuse in relation to an alleged incident on 2 January 2019, despite Montiel denying the allegations. Later in 2024, Montiel was ordered by a judge to undergo two separate psychiatric evaluations in Argentina. Yet, his lawyer asserted there was no evidence or testimony relating Montiel to the case, and expects it to be dismissed. Then, in due process, Montiel was acquitted of the sexual assault charge when the accusation was deemed to be "totally false". The case was dismissed in court during December 2024.

== Career statistics ==
=== Club ===
As of match played 1 November 2026

Appearances and goals by club, season and competition
Club	Season	League			National cup (Note: Includes Copa Argentina, Copa del Rey, FA Cup)		League cup (Note: Includes EFL Cup)		Continental		Other		Total	
Club	Season	Division	Apps	Goals	Apps	Goals	Apps	Goals	Apps	Goals	Apps	Goals	Apps	Goals
River Plate	2016	Argentine Primera División	1	0	1	0	—		0	0	0	0	2	0
River Plate	2016–17	Argentine Primera División	4	0	5	0	—		3 (Note: Appearances in Copa Libertadores)	1	—		12	1
River Plate	2017–18	Argentine Primera División	15	0	6	0	—		6	0	1 (Note: Appearance in Supercopa Argentina)	0	28	0
River Plate	2018–19	Argentine Primera División	12	0	5	0	—		13	0	3 (Note: One appearance in FIFA Club World Cup, one appearance in Copa de la Superliga, one appearance in Recopa Sudamericana)	0	33	0
River Plate	2019–20	Argentine Primera División	19	0	0	0	—		8	0	—		27	0
River Plate	2020–21	Argentine Primera División	9	0	1	0	—		10	1	—		20	1
River Plate	2021	Argentine Primera División	12	3	1	0	—		5	1	—		18	4
River Plate	Total		72	3	19	0	—		45	3	4	0	140	6
Sevilla	2021–22	La Liga	18	1	4	0	—		6 (Note: Four appearances in UEFA Champions League, two appearances in UEFA Europa League)	0	—		28	1
Sevilla	2022–23	La Liga	28	0	4	0	—		11 (Note: Four appearances and one goal in UEFA Champions League, seven appearances in UEFA Europa League)	1	—		43	1
Sevilla	2023–24	La Liga	0	0	—		—		—		1 (Note: Appearance in UEFA Super Cup)	0	1	0
Sevilla	2024–25	La Liga	6	0	3	1	—		—		—		9	1
Sevilla	Total		52	1	11	1	—		17	1	1	0	81	3
Nottingham Forest (loan)	2023–24	Premier League	14	0	4	0	1	0	—		—		19	0
River Plate	2025	Argentine Primera División	22	3	4	2	—		7	0	4 (Note: One appearance in Supercopa Internacional, three appearances in FIFA Club World Cup)	0	37	5
River Plate	2026	Argentine Primera División	30	7	1	0	—		3 (Note: Appearances in Copa Sudamericana)	0	—		34	7
River Plate	Total		52	10	5	2	—		10	0	4	0	71	12
Career total			190	14	39	3	1	0	72	4	9	0	311	21

=== International ===
As of match played 19 July 2026

Appearances and goals by national team and year
National team	Year	Apps	Goals
Argentina	2019	4	0
Argentina	2020	4	0
Argentina	2021	5	0
Argentina	2022	9	0
Argentina	2023	2	1
Argentina	2024	12	0
Argentina	2025	2	1
Argentina	2026	7	0
Total		45	2

As of match played 14 October 2025
Scores and results list Argentina's goal tally first, score column indicates score after each Montiel goal.

List of international goals scored by Gonzalo Montiel
No.	Date	Venue	Cap	Opponent	Score	Result	Competition
1	28 March 2023	Estadio Único Madre de Ciudades, Santiago del Estero, Argentina	23	Curaçao	7–0	7–0	Friendly
2	14 October 2025	Chase Stadium, Fort Lauderdale, United States	38	Puerto Rico	2–0	6–0	Friendly

== Honours ==
River Plate

- Argentine Primera División: 2021
- Copa Argentina: 2015–16, 2016–17, 2018–19
- Supercopa Argentina: 2017, 2019
- Copa Libertadores: 2018
- Recopa Sudamericana: 2016, 2019

Sevilla

- UEFA Europa League: 2022–23
- UEFA–CONMEBOL Club Challenge: 2023

Argentina

- FIFA World Cup: 2022; runner-up: 2026
- Copa América: 2021, 2024
