= Lucas Alario =

Argentine footballer (born 1992)

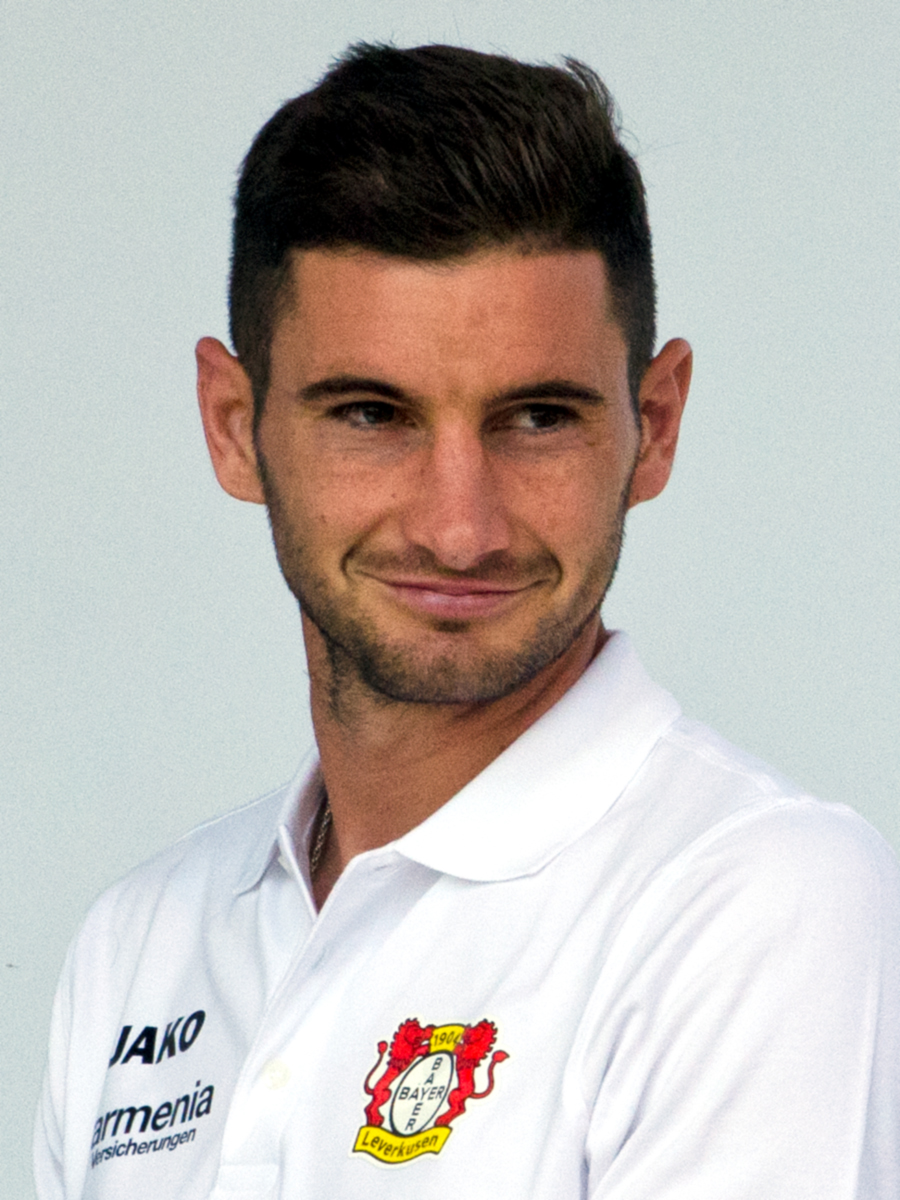
- Alario with Bayer Leverkusen in 2018

Personal information
- Full name: Lucas Nicolás Alario
- Date of birth: 8 October 1992 (age 34)
- Place of birth: Tostado, Argentina
- Height: 1.84 m (6 ft 0 in)
- Position: Forward

Team information
- Current team: Estudiantes de La Plata
- Number: 27

Youth career
- Colón

Senior career*
Years	Team	Apps	(Gls)
2011–2015	Colón	58	(12)
2015–2017	River Plate	47	(22)
2017–2022	Bayer Leverkusen	126	(42)
2022–2024	Eintracht Frankfurt	20	(1)
2024	Internacional	36	(5)
2025–	Estudiantes	34	(2)

International career
2016–2021	Argentina	9	(3)
- * Club domestic league appearances and goals as of 17:36, 21 November 2026 (UTC)

Lucas Nicolás Alario (born 8 October 1992) is an Argentine professional footballer who plays as a forward for Argentine Primera División club Estudiantes.

== Club career ==
=== Colón ===
Born in Tostado, Santa Fe, Alario began his career at Colón in his native province. He made his Argentine Primera División debut on 11 June 2011, as a 59th-minute substitute for Cristian Raúl Ledesma in a 0–1 home defeat to Arsenal. His first goal for the club came on 22 March 2014, a fourth-minute penalty for the only goal of a win against Tigre at the Estadio Brigadier General Estanislao López. On 12 May 2015, he netted twice in a 3–2 away win at Defensa y Justicia for Colón's first away win of the season.

=== River Plate ===
On 26 June 2015, Alario became River Plate's fourth signing of the season, joining the Buenos Aires-based club on a four-year contract for a fee of 2.25 million US Dollars. He made his debut on 11 July, replacing Fernando Cavenaghi for the final 30 minutes of a 1–1 home draw against Temperley. Eleven days later, as a substitute, he equalised for a 1–1 draw away to Paraguay's Club Guaraní in the second leg of the Copa Libertadores semi-finals, converting a pass from Tabaré Viúdez to send River through 3–1 on aggregate to their first such finals since 1996. On 5 August, in the second leg of the final after a goalless first, he finished Leonel Vangioni's cross at the end of the first half to open the scoring as his team won 3–0 against Tigres UANL.

Eighteen days after River won the continental championship, Alario was sent off in a 2–1 domestic loss to Estudiantes de La Plata. His first league goals for the Millonarios came in the form of a hat-trick on 6 September, in a 4–1 win away to Nueva Chicago. On 31 October, as a 55th-minute substitute for Nicolás Bertolo, he scored the only goal in a win at Vélez Sarsfield.

On 16 December, in the semi-finals of the 2015 FIFA Club World Cup in Osaka, Alario headed the only goal to defeat Sanfrecce Hiroshima. Four days later he played the entirety of the final, a 3–0 loss to FC Barcelona.

On 25 August 2016, Alario scored again finishing the game and yet another international title with River Plate in Buenos Aires to take over Recopa Sudamericana 2016. He was rated by many football experts in Argentina as the best striker playing in Argentina.

=== Bayer Leverkusen ===
On 22 September 2017, Alario signed for German Bundesliga side Bayer Leverkusen on a five-year deal. He scored his first goal for the club on his debut in a 3–0 win over Hamburger SV two days later.

On 18 May 2019, during the final matchday of the 2018–19 Bundesliga campaign, Alario scored three goals in a 5–1 win against Hertha BSC, becoming the first Argentine player to score a hat-trick in the Bundesliga.

In April 2021, Alario suffered a muscle and tendon injury that forced him to miss the remainder of the season. On 2 August, he signed a three-year contract extension with Leverkusen, running until 2024.

=== Eintracht Frankfurt ===
On 24 June 2022, Alario signed a two-year contract with fellow Bundesliga side Eintracht Frankfurt.

=== Internacional ===
On 4 January 2024, Alario moved to Brazil, signing a two-year contract with Brasileiro Série A club Internacional.

== International career ==
Alario received his first international call-up for Argentina on 12 August 2016, for matches against Uruguay and Venezuela. Alario had his first appearance on 1 September 2016, coming from the bench replacing Lucas Pratto in the 71st minute during a 2018 FIFA World Cup qualifying match against Uruguay. He scored his first international goal when he scored the fifth goal in a 6–0 friendly away win against Singapore on 13 June 2017.

Alario was included in the Argentina squad for the 2021 Copa América, but withdrew due to a thigh injury and was replaced by Julián Álvarez.

== Career statistics ==
=== Club ===
As of match played 15 April 2023.

Appearances and goals by club, season and competition
Club	Season	League			Cup (Note: Includes Copa Argentina and DFB-Pokal)		Continental		Other		Total	
Club	Season	Division	Apps	Goals	Apps	Goals	Apps	Goals	Apps	Goals	Apps	Goals
Colón	2010–11	Argentine Primera División	1	0	—		—		—		1	0
Colón	2011–12	Argentine Primera División	9	0	—		—		—		9	0
Colón	2012–13	Argentine Primera División	2	0	—		—		—		2	0
Colón	2013–14	Argentine Primera División	21	3	2	0	—		—		23	3
Colón	2014	Primera B Nacional	15	6	—		—		—		15	6
Colón	2015	Argentine Primera División	10	3	—		—		—		10	3
Colón	Total		58	12	2	0	—		—		60	12
River Plate	2015	Argentine Primera División	6	4	—		8 (Note: Four appearances and two goals in Copa Libertadores, four appearances and one goal in Copa Sudamericana)	3	2 (Note: Appearances in FIFA Club World Cup)	1	16	8
River Plate	2016	Argentine Primera División	13	6	6	7	7 (Note: Appearances in Copa Libertadores)	3	2 (Note: Appearances in Recopa Sudamericana)	1	28	17
River Plate	2016–17	Argentine Primera División	27	12	—		8	3	—		35	15
River Plate	2017–18	Argentine Primera División	1	0	2	1	—		—		3	1
River Plate	Total		47	22	8	8	23	9	4	2	82	41
Bayer Leverkusen	2017–18	Bundesliga	23	9	3	1	—		—		26	10
Bayer Leverkusen	2018–19	Bundesliga	27	9	2	1	7 (Note: Appearances in UEFA Europa League)	4	—		36	14
Bayer Leverkusen	2019–20	Bundesliga	24	7	4	3	8 (Note: Five appearances in UEFA Champions League, three appearances and two goals in UEFA Europa League)	2	—		36	12
Bayer Leverkusen	2020–21	Bundesliga	25	11	3	2	5	2	—		33	15
Bayer Leverkusen	2021–22	Bundesliga	27	6	0	0	6	1	—		33	7
Bayer Leverkusen	Total		126	42	12	7	26	9	—		164	58
Eintracht Frankfurt	2022–23	Bundesliga	20	1	3	1	2 (Note: Appearances in UEFA Champions League)	0	1 (Note: Appearance in UEFA Super Cup)	0	26	2
Career total			238	77	25	16	51	18	5	2	319	113

=== International ===
Argentina
Year	Apps	Goals
2016	2	0
2017	1	1
2019	4	2
2020	2	0
Total	9	3

==== International goals ====
Scores and results list Argentina's goal tally first.

No.	Date	Venue	Opponent	Score	Result	Competition
1.	13 June 2017	National Stadium, Kallang, Singapore	Singapore	5–0	6–0	Friendly
2.	9 October 2019	Signal Iduna Park, Dortmund, Germany	Germany	1–2	2–2	Friendly
3.	13 October 2019	Estadio Manuel Martínez Valero, Alicante, Spain	Ecuador	1–0	6–1	Friendly

== Honours ==
River Plate

- Copa Argentina: 2015–16, 2016–17
- Copa Libertadores: 2015
- Recopa Sudamericana: 2016
- Suruga Bank Championship: 2015
- FIFA Club World Cup runner-up: 2015

Estudiantes

- Primera División: 2025 Clausura
- Trofeo de Campeones: 2025
- Supercopa Argentina: 2025

Argentina

- Superclásico de las Américas: 2017, 2019
