= Pity Martínez =

Argentine footballer (born 1993)

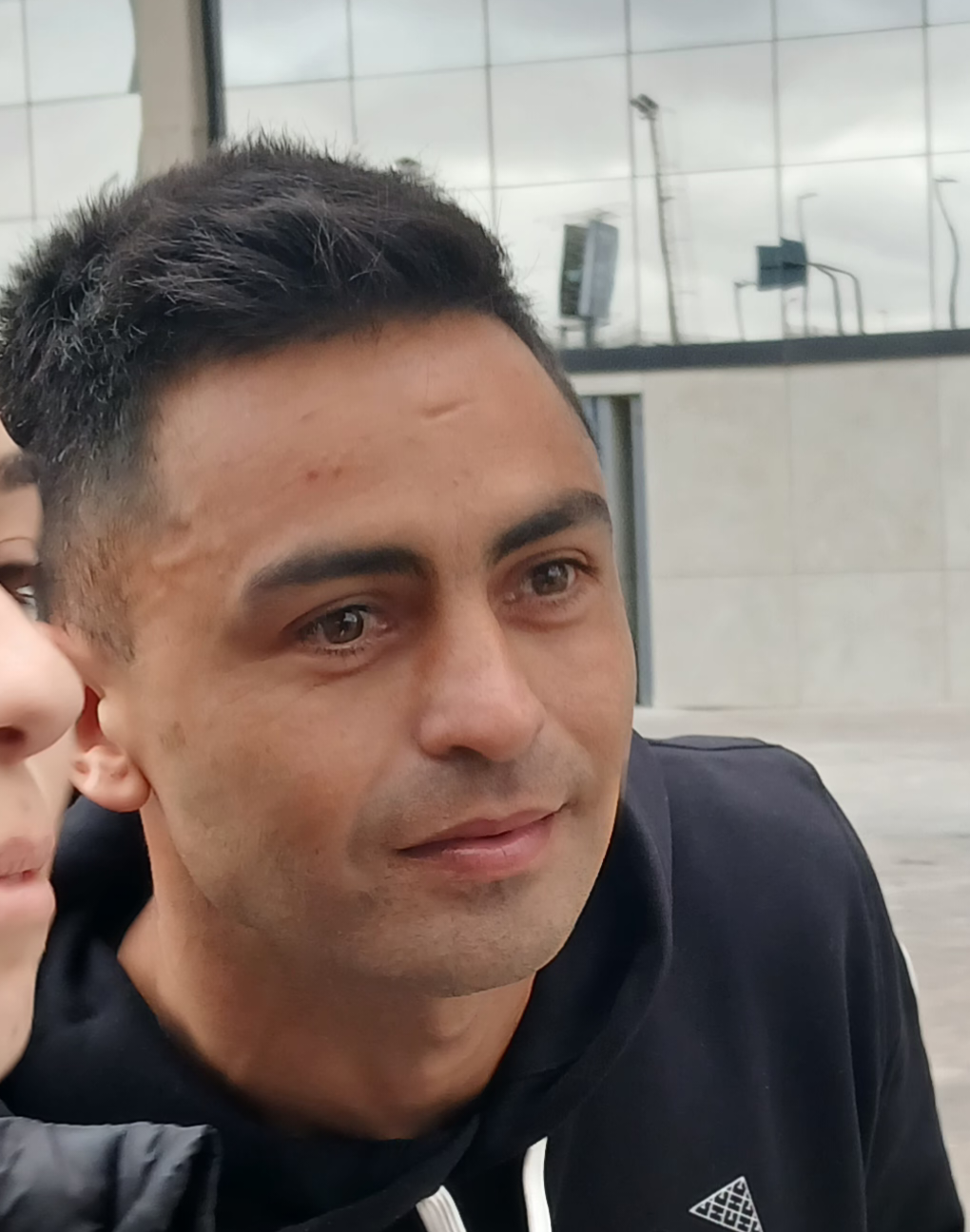
- Martínez in 2025

Personal information
- Full name: Gonzalo Nicolás Martínez
- Date of birth: 13 June 1993 (age 33)
- Place of birth: Guaymallén, Mendoza, Argentina
- Height: 1.70 m (5 ft 7 in)
- Position: Attacking midfielder

Team information
- Current team: Tigre
- Number: 28

Youth career
- –2011: Huracán

Senior career*
Years	Team	Apps	(Gls)
2011–2015	Huracán	93	(8)
2015–2018	River Plate	94	(22)
2019–2020	Atlanta United	39	(7)
2020–2023	Al Nassr	43	(11)
2023–2026	River Plate	26	(2)
2026–	Tigre	19	(3)

International career^{‡}
2018–2019	Argentina	3	(1)
- * Club domestic league appearances and goals as of 17:56, 9 November 2026 (UTC) ‡ National team caps and goals as of 11 September 2018

Gonzalo Nicolás Martínez, commonly known as Pity Martínez (born 13 June 1993), is an Argentine professional footballer who plays as an attacking midfielder for Argentine Primera División club Tigre.

== Club career ==
=== Huracán ===
Martínez, who trained in the Huracán youth system, debuted with Huracán's first team in the 2011–12 season. While at the club, he won his first Copa Argentina in 2014.

=== River Plate ===
Martínez joined River Plate in January 2015. Martínez made his club debut on 16 February 2015 against Club Atlético Sarmiento in a 4–1 away win. On 25 April 2015, his former team Huracán beat River Plate for the Supercopa Argentina title. In the Copa Libertadores, Martínez played in the quarter-final first leg match against Boca Juniors, a match River Plate would go on to win. Martínez won two more Copas Argentinas in a row, in 2016 and 2017. Martínez added two Recopa Sudamericanas, in 2015 and 2016. Martínez also won two Copas Libertadores, in 2015 and 2018, as well as one Suruga Bank Championship in 2015, in which he scored in River's 3–0 win over Gamba Osaka. He was instrumental in obtaining his first Supercopa Argentina title against Boca in 2017.

On 9 December 2018, Martínez scored his side's third goal to seal a 3–1 win, 5–3 aggregate victory, over Boca Juniors in the second leg of the Copa Libertadores held at Real Madrid's Bernabéu Stadium. Following the victory, he announced that he would be joining MLS side Atlanta United after the FIFA Club World Cup, as the club had met his $17 million release clause.

=== Atlanta United ===
On 24 January 2019, Martínez's transfer to Major League Soccer side Atlanta United was confirmed. On 12 May 2019, Martínez scored his first goal for Atlanta United during a 1–0 victory against Orlando City. He scored the game winner in the U.S. Open Cup final victory over Minnesota United on 27 August.

=== Al-Nassr ===
On 7 September 2020, Martínez joined Saudi Professional League side Al-Nassr for a reported transfer fee of $18 million.

=== Return to River Plate ===
On 24 August 2023, River Plate announced that it had re-signed Martinez.

=== Tigre ===
On 22 January 2026, after leaving River Player as a free agent, Martínez was signed by Club Atlético Tigre.

== International career ==
On 8 September 2018, Martínez made his Argentina national team debut in a 3–0 victory over Guatemala. He started the match, scored from the penalty spot after a handball by Elías Vásquez midway through the first half, and was replaced by Franco Vázquez in the 56th minute.

== Personal life ==
His nickname, Pity, refers to the wren ("pititorra"), from his native homeland of Guaymallén, in Mendoza, Argentina. He was given the nickname at the age of five, and does not respond to his given name, Gonzalo.

== Career statistics ==
=== Club ===
As of match played 17 February 2023

Appearances and goals by club, season and competition
Club	Season	League			National cup (Note: Includes Copa Argentina, U.S. Open Cup, King Cup)		Continental		Other		Total	
Club	Season	Division	Apps	Goals	Apps	Goals	Apps	Goals	Apps	Goals	Apps	Goals
Huracán	2011–12	Primera B Nacional	15	0	0	0	—		—		15	0
Huracán	2012–13	Primera B Nacional	28	0	2	0	—		—		30	0
Huracán	2013–14	Primera B Nacional	29	4	0	0	—		—		29	4
Huracán	2014	Primera B Nacional	21	4	1	0	—		—		22	4
Huracán	Total		93	8	7	2	—		—		96	8
River Plate	2015	Argentine Primera División	24	4	2	0	17 (Note: Twelve appearances in Copa Libertadores, five appearances in Copa Sudamericana)	0	5 (Note: Two appearances in Recopa Sudamericana, one appearance in Supercopa Argentina, one appearance and one goal in Suruga Bank Championship, one appearance in FIFA Club World Cup)	1	49	5
River Plate	2016	Argentine Primera División	14	3	0	0	3 (Note: Appearances in Copa Libertadores)	0	—		17	3
River Plate	2016–17	Argentine Primera División	28	7	5	1	5	0	3 (Note: Two appearances in Recopa Sudamericana, one appearance in Supercopa Argentina)	0	41	8
River Plate	2017–18	Argentine Primera División	21	6	4	2	10	1	1 (Note: Appearance in Supercopa Argentina)	1	36	10
River Plate	2018–19	Argentine Primera División	7	2	3	2	6	2	2 (Note: Appearances in FIFA Club World Cup)	2	18	8
River Plate	Total		94	22	14	5	41	3	11	4	160	34
Atlanta United	2019	MLS	32	5	5	2	4 (Note: Appearances in CONCACAF Champions League)	0	3 (Note: Two appearances in MLS Cup Playoffs, one appearance in Campeones Cup)	0	44	7
Atlanta United	2020	MLS	7 (Note: Includes three appearances in MLS is Back Tournament)	2	—		3	2	—		10	4
Atlanta United	Total		39	7	5	2	7	2	3	0	54	11
Al Nassr	2020–21	Saudi Pro League	18	3	3	1	7 (Note: Appearances in AFC Champions League)	1	1 (Note: Appearance in Saudi Super Cup)	0	29	5
Al Nassr	2021–22	Saudi Pro League	18	8	2	0	0	0	–		20	8
Al Nassr	2022–23	Saudi Pro League	7	0	1	0	–		1	0	9	0
Al Nassr	Total		43	11	6	1	7	1	2	0	58	13
Career total			279	48	32	10	55	6	16	4	368	66

=== International ===
Scores and results list Argentina's goal tally first.

No.	Date	Venue	Opponent	Score	Result	Competition
1.	7 September 2018	Los Angeles Memorial Coliseum, Los Angeles, United States	Guatemala	1–0	3–0	Friendly

== Honours ==
Huracán

- Copa Argentina: 2013–14

River Plate

- Copa Argentina: 2015–16, 2016–17
- Supercopa Argentina: 2017, 2023
- Copa Libertadores: 2015, 2018
- Recopa Sudamericana: 2015, 2016
- Suruga Bank Championship: 2015
- Trofeo de Campeones: 2023
- FIFA Club World Cup runner-up: 2015

Atlanta United

- U.S. Open Cup: 2019
- Campeones Cup: 2019

Al-Nassr

- Saudi Super Cup: 2020

Individual

- South American Footballer of the Year: 2018
- Copa Libertadores Best Player: 2018
- Footballer of the Year of Argentina: 2018
- MLS All-Star: 2019
