= Dairon Mosquera =

Colombian footballer (born 1992)

Personal information
- Full name: Dairon Mosquera Chaverra
- Date of birth: 23 July 1992 (age 34)
- Place of birth: Bojayá, Colombia
- Height: 1.82 m (6 ft 0 in)
- Position: Left back

Team information
- Current team: Unión Magdalena
- Number: 30

Senior career*
Years	Team	Apps	(Gls)
2011	Atlético Bucaramanga	3	(0)
2012–2013	Cortuluá	30	(7)
2013	→ Independiente Medellín (loan)	24	(1)
2014–2017	Santa Fe	102	(0)
2018–2019	Pachuca	1	(0)
2018	→ Olimpia (loan)	2	(0)
2019	→ Independiente Medellín (loan)	12	(0)
2020–2024	Santa Fe	124	(2)
2025–	Unión Magdalena	19	(1)
- * Club domestic league appearances and goals as of 12 December 2025

Dairon Mosquera Chaverra (born 23 July 1992) is a Colombian professional footballer who plays as a defender for Categoría Primera A club Unión Magdalena.

== Honours ==
=== Club ===
Santa Fe

- Copa Sudamericana : 2015
- Categoría Primera A : 2014-II
- Superliga Colombiana : 2015
