= Iván Rossi =

Argentine footballer

Personal information
- Full name: Iván Javier Rossi
- Date of birth: 1 November 1993 (age 33)
- Place of birth: Castelar, Buenos Aires, Argentina
- Height: 1.81 m (5 ft 11 in)
- Position: Midfielder

Team information
- Current team: Danubio
- Number: 16

Youth career
- –2014: Banfield

Senior career*
Years	Team	Apps	(Gls)
2014–2016	Banfield	24	(1)
2016–2021	River Plate	13	(0)
2018–2019	→ Huracán (loan)	23	(0)
2019	→ Colo-Colo (loan)	4	(0)
2021	Sambenedettese	14	(0)
2021–2022	Marítimo	27	(0)
2022–2023	Atlético Junior	8	(0)
2023–2024	Platense	26	(0)
2024–2026	CA Juventud	43	(0)
2026–	Danubio	3	(0)
- * Club domestic league appearances and goals as of 13 March 2026

Iván Javier Rossi (born 1 November 1993) is an Argentine professional footballer. He plays as a midfielder for Uruguayan Primera División club Danubio.

== Club career ==
On 1 February 2021, he signed a 1.5-year contract with Italian Serie C club Sambenedettese.

On 14 July 2021, he moved to Portugal and signed a contract with Primeira Liga club Marítimo.

On 31 January 2023, Rossi signed a one-year contract with Platense.

== Honours ==
Banfield

- Primera B Nacional: 2013–14

River Plate

- Copa Argentina: 2015–16, 2016–17
- Recopa Sudamericana: 2016
