= Maximiliano Velazco =

Argentine footballer

Personal information
- Full name: Ramón Maximiliano Velazco
- Date of birth: 8 March 1995 (age 31)
- Place of birth: Villa Constitución, Argentina
- Height: 1.86 m (6 ft 1 in)
- Position: Goalkeeper

Team information
- Current team: San Martín SJ

Youth career
- 2007–2016: River Plate

Senior career*
Years	Team	Apps	(Gls)
2016–2020	River Plate	0	(0)
2017–2018	→ Arsenal de Sarandí (loan)	2	(0)
2018–2019	→ Defensores de Belgrano (loan)	32	(0)
2020	→ Cobreloa (loan)	26	(0)
2021–2025	Cobreloa	30	(0)
2023	→ Deportes Santa Cruz (loan)	28	(0)
2024	→ San Luis (loan)	21	(0)
2025–	San Martín SJ	5	(0)
- * Club domestic league appearances and goals as of 18:37, 19 March 2026 (UTC)

Ramón Maximiliano Velazco (born 8 March 1995), known as Maximiliano Velazco, is an Argentine professional footballer who plays as a goalkeeper for San Martín SJ.

== Career ==
Velazco's first club was Argentine Primera División side River Plate, he played in the youth ranks for nine years. He appeared on the substitutes bench fifteen times in all competitions during the 2016 and 2016–17 seasons, prior to making his professional debut on 25 May 2017 in River Plate's final Group 3 match in the 2017 Copa Libertadores versus Independiente Medellín. In August 2017, Velazco joined Arsenal de Sarandí on loan. After being an unused substitute twenty-two times, his first league appearance arrived on 14 April 2018 versus Belgrano; one of two matches for them.

A loan to Defensores de Belgrano followed. Having featured in twenty-four games for Defensores de Belgrano in 2018–19, his loan with them was extended on 20 June 2019. He returned to River at the end of the year, prior to securing a loan move to Primera B de Chile with Cobreloa in January 2020. His debut arrived on 13 January in the preceding campaign's promotion play-offs, delayed from the end of 2019, as his new side lost to Deportes Temuco at the first hurdle. He appeared twenty-six times in 2020, which preceded Cobreloa signing Velazco permanently; penning a four-year contract.

For the 2024 season, he signed with San Luis de Quillota on loan from Cobreloa.

In 2025, he returned to Argentina, joining Primera División club San Martín SJ on a free transfer.

== Career statistics ==
As of 2 January 2021.

Club statistics
Club	Season	League			Cup		League Cup		Continental		Other		Total	
Club	Season	Division	Apps	Goals	Apps	Goals	Apps	Goals	Apps	Goals	Apps	Goals	Apps	Goals
River Plate	2016	Primera División	0	0	0	0	—		0	0	0	0	0	0
River Plate	2016–17	Primera División	0	0	0	0	—		1 (Note: Appearance(s) in the Copa Libertadores)	0	0	0	1	0
River Plate	2017–18	Primera División	0	0	0	0	—		0	0	0	0	0	0
River Plate	2018–19	Primera División	0	0	0	0	0	0	0	0	0	0	0	0
River Plate	2019–20	Primera División	0	0	0	0	0	0	0	0	0	0	0	0
River Plate	2020–21	Primera División	0	0	0	0	0	0	0	0	0	0	0	0
River Plate	Total		0	0	0	0	0	0	1	0	0	0	1	0
Arsenal de Sarandí (loan)	2017–18	Primera División	2	0	0	0	—		0	0	0	0	2	0
Defensores de Belgrano (loan)	2018–19	Primera B Nacional	24	0	0	0	—		—		0	0	24	0
Defensores de Belgrano (loan)	2019–20	Primera B Nacional	8	0	0	0	—		—		0	0	8	0
Defensores de Belgrano (loan)	Total		32	0	0	0	—		1	0	0	0	32	0
Cobreloa (loan)	2019	Primera B	1	0	0	0	—		—		0	0	1	0
Cobreloa (loan)	2020	Primera B	25	0	0	0	—		—		0	0	25	0
Cobreloa	2021	Primera B	0	0	0	0	—		—		0	0	0	0
Cobreloa	Total		26	0	0	0	—		—		0	0	26	0
Career total			60	0	0	0	0	0	1	0	0	0	61	0

== Honours ==
River Plate

- Dallas Cup: 2014
- Weifang Cup: 2014
