= Enrique Bologna =

Argentine footballer

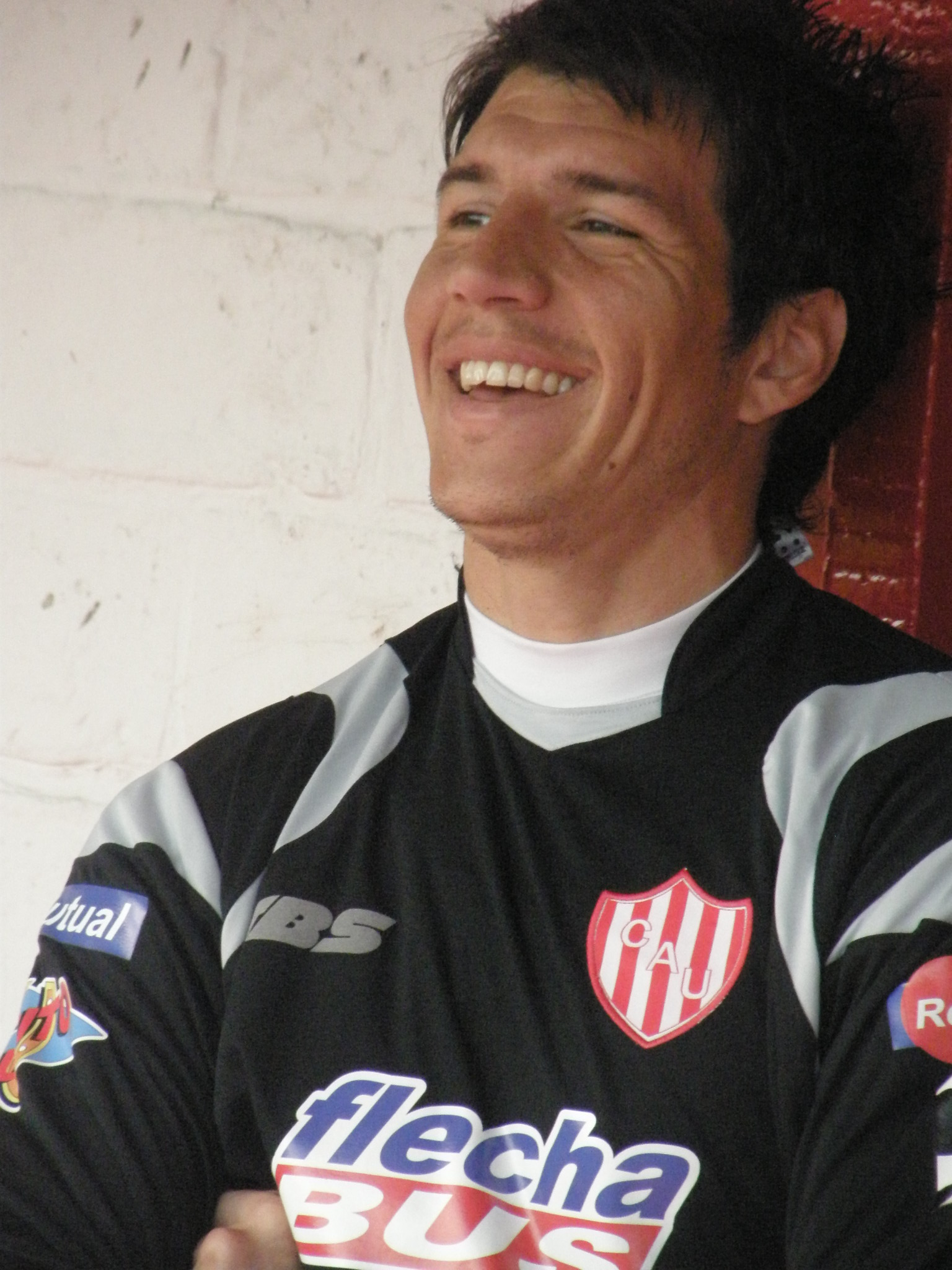
- Bologna with Unión de Santa Fe

Personal information
- Full name: Enrique Alberto Bologna Gómez
- Date of birth: 13 February 1982 (age 44)
- Place of birth: Claypole, Buenos Aires, Argentina
- Height: 1.89 m (6 ft 2 in)
- Position: Goalkeeper

Team information
- Current team: Chacarita Juniors
- Number: 1

Youth career
- Banfield

Senior career*
Years	Team	Apps	(Gls)
2003–2015	Banfield	50	(1)
2008	→ Alianza Lima (loan)	26	(4)
2011–2012	→ Unión (loan)	34	(2)
2012–2013	→ Peñarol (loan)	31	(0)
2016	Gimnasia LP	15	(0)
2016–2022	River Plate	16	(0)
2022–2023	Banfield	19	(0)
2023–2026	Defensa y Justicia	64	(0)
2026–	Chacarita Juniors	3	(0)
- * Club domestic league appearances and goals as of 17:13, 13 March 2026 (UTC)

Enrique Alberto Bologna Gómez (born 13 February 1982 in Claypole, Buenos Aires), known as Enrique Bologna, is an Argentine professional footballer who plays for Chacarita Juniors.

== Career ==
Bologna began playing for Banfield in 2003, he spent 2008 on loan to Peruvian side Alianza Lima. He returned to Banfield in 2008 and was a non playing member of the squad that won the Apertura 2009 championship.

== Career statistics ==
As of match played 28 May 2025

Appearances and goals by club, season and competition
Club	Division	League			Cup		Continental		Total	
Club	Division	Season	Apps	Goals	Apps	Goals	Apps	Goals	Apps	Goals
Banfield	Argentine Primera División	2002-03	0	0	-		-		0	0
Banfield	Argentine Primera División	2003-04	0	0	-		-		0	0
Banfield	Argentine Primera División	2004-05	0	0	-		0	0	0	0
Banfield	Argentine Primera División	2005-06	0	0	-		0	0	0	0
Banfield	Argentine Primera División	2006-07	1	0	-		0	0	1	0
Banfield	Argentine Primera División	2007-08	0	0	-		-		0	0
Banfield	Argentine Primera División	2008-09	4	0	-		-		4	0
Banfield	Argentine Primera División	2009-10	7	0	-		0	0	7	0
Banfield	Argentine Primera División	2010-11	38	1	-		4	0	42	1
Banfield	Primera B Nacional	2013-14	30	0	0	0	-		30	0
Banfield	Argentine Primera División	2014	0	0	-		-		0	0
Banfield	Argentine Primera División	2015	28	0	1	0	-		29	0
Banfield	Argentine Primera División	2022	7	0	13	0	6	0	26	0
Banfield	Total		115	1	14	0	10	0	139	1
Alianza Lima	Peruvian Primera División	2008	26	4	-		-		26	4
Unión	Argentine Primera División	2011-12	34	2	0	0	-		34	2
Peñarol	Uruguayan Primera División	2012-13	26	0	-		6	0	32	0
Gimnasia LP	Argentine Primera División	2016	15	0	-		-		15	0
River Plate	Argentine Primera División	2016-17	1	0	0	0	0	0	1	0
River Plate	Argentine Primera División	2017-18	4	0	1	0	0	0	5	0
River Plate	Argentine Primera División	2018-19	0	0	0	0	0	0	0	0
River Plate	Argentine Primera División	2019-20	2	0	0	0	1	0	3	0
River Plate	Argentine Primera División	2020	-		5	0	0	0	5	0
River Plate	Argentine Primera División	2021	4	0	0	0	0	0	4	0
River Plate	Total		11	0	6	0	1	0	18	0
Defensa y Justicia	Argentine Primera División	2023	6	0	13	0	6	0	25	0
Defensa y Justicia	Argentine Primera División	2024	17	0	1	0	-		18	0
Defensa y Justicia	Argentine Primera División	2025	16	0	2	0	6	0	24	0
Defensa y Justicia	Total		39	0	16	0	12	0	67	0
Career total			267	7	36	0	28	0	331	7

== Honours ==
Banfield

- Argentine Primera División: Apertura 2009
- Primera B Nacional: 2013–14

Peñarol

- Uruguayan Primera División: 2012–13

River Plate

- Recopa Sudamericana: 2016
- Copa Argentina: 2015–16
- Supercopa Argentina: 2017
- Copa Libertadores: 2018
