= Luis Olivera =

Argentine footballer

Personal information
- Full name: Luis Julian Olivera
- Date of birth: 24 October 1998 (age 28)
- Place of birth: Argentina
- Height: 1.66 m (5 ft 5 in)
- Position: Left back

Team information
- Current team: Defensores Unidos

Youth career
- –2015: River Plate

Senior career*
Years	Team	Apps	(Gls)
2015–2019	River Plate	7	(0)
2017	→ San Martín (loan)	13	(0)
2019	→ Club Atlético River Plate (loan)	6	(0)
2019–2020	Atenas	0	(0)
2019–2020	→ Sporting Kansas City II (loan)	1	(0)
2020–2021	Fénix	26	(1)
2022	Colegiales	2	(0)
2022	→ Defensores Unidos (loan)	18	(2)
2023	Alvarado	20	(0)
2024–	Defensores Unidos	40	(2)
2025	→ Gimnasia y Tiro (loan)	9	(0)

International career
2013	Argentina U15	11	(1)
2015	Argentina U17	11	(0)
- * Club domestic league appearances and goals as of 17:02, 30 July 2025 (UTC)

Luis Julian Olivera (24 October 1998) is an Argentine footballer who plays for Defensores Unidos.

== Club career ==
Olivera is a youth exponent from River Plate. He made his league debut on 8 November 2015 against Newell's Old Boys.

On 3 January 2019, Olivera was loaned out to Uruguayan Primera División club Club Atlético River Plate in Montevideo for the 2019 season.

On 10 September 2019, Olivera was loaned to Swope Park Rangers in the USL Championship, after signing with Uruguayan club Atenas de San Carlos that summer. After one appearance, Olivera's loan expired and he returned to Atenas.
