= Augusto Batalla =

Argentine footballer (born 1996)

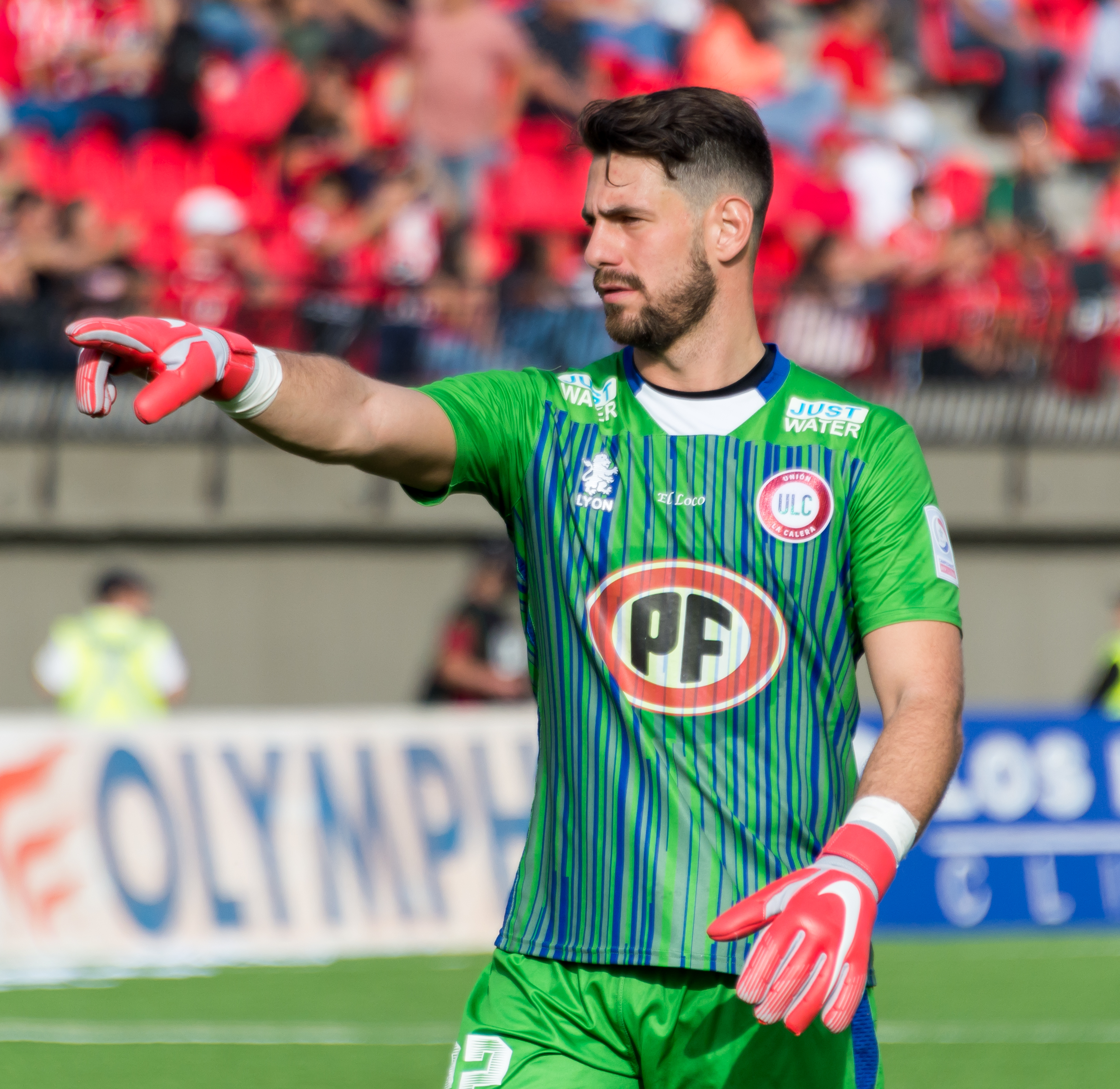
- Batalla with Unión La Calera in 2019

Personal information
- Full name: Augusto Martín Batalla Barga
- Date of birth: 30 April 1996 (age 30)
- Place of birth: Hurlingham, Buenos Aires, Argentina
- Height: 1.85 m (6 ft 1 in)
- Position: Goalkeeper

Team information
- Current team: Rayo Vallecano
- Number: 13

Youth career
- 2001–2016: River Plate

Senior career*
Years	Team	Apps	(Gls)
2016–2025	River Plate	36	(0)
2018	→ Atlético Tucumán (loan)	13	(0)
2018	→ Tigre (loan)	10	(0)
2019	→ Unión La Calera (loan)	22	(0)
2020–2021	→ O'Higgins (loan)	32	(0)
2021–2023	→ San Lorenzo (loan)	54	(0)
2024	→ Granada (loan)	17	(0)
2024–2025	→ Rayo Vallecano (loan)	32	(0)
2025–	Rayo Vallecano	36	(0)

International career
2011	Argentina U15	6	(0)
2013	Argentina U17	15	(0)
2015	Argentina U20	13	(0)
- * Club domestic league appearances and goals as of 20 August 2026

Augusto Martín Batalla Barga (born 30 April 1996) is an Argentine professional footballer who plays as a goalkeeper for La Liga club Rayo Vallecano. He is a former Argentina U20's international.

== Club career ==
Batalla is product of the River Plate academy, which he joined as a five-year old. In 2015, River Plate accepted a loan offer from La Liga side Real Madrid for Batalla with the option of a permanent move. However, Batalla turned down the move to Real Madrid for personal reasons.

He made his first-team debut in 2016 and was promoted by manager Marcelo Gallardo as first-choice goalkeeper after Marcelo Barovero left the club. Batalla remained as the club's first choice goalkeeper, initially impressing, winning the 2015–16 Copa Argentina and the 2016 Recopa Sudamericana titles, before losing his place after errors and the signing of German Lux in June 2017.

After falling further down the pecking order after the signing of Argentina goalkeeper Franco Armani in January 2018. On 5 January 2018, Batalla signed a one-year loan deal with fellow Argentine Primera División side Atlético Tucumán. After impressing and helping the club progress in the Copa Libertadores, On 25 June, Batalla announced on his social media he would be leaving Atlético Tucumán from his loan spell early.

On 3 January 2024, Batalla joined Spanish club Granada in La Liga on loan for the remainder of the season, with the option to make the move permanent. On 23 August, after suffering relegation, he moved to fellow league team Rayo Vallecano also in a temporary deal.

On 20 March 2025, Rayo bought Batalla permanently, with the player agreeing to a contract until 2030. On 7 May 2026, he saved a stoppage-time penalty in the Conference League semi-final second leg against Strasbourg, helping his club secure a place in the final with a 2–0 aggregate victory.

== International career ==
Batalla has represented Argentina at various youth levels, including winning South American Under-17 Football Championship in 2013 for the Argentina U17 's where he won the Best goalkeeper of the South American Under-17 Football Championship's and he also won the South American Youth Football Championship for the Argentina U20 in 2015.

== Career statistics ==
As of match played 20 August 2026

Appearances and goals by club, season and competition
Club	Season	League			Cup		Continental		Other		Total	
Club	Season	Division	Apps	Goals	Apps	Goals	Apps	Goals	Apps	Goals	Apps	Goals
River Plate	2016	Argentine Primera División	4	0	6	0	2 (Note: Appearance(s) in CONMEBOL Recopa)	0	2 (Note: Appearance(s) in Torneos de Verano)	0	14	0
River Plate	2016–17	Argentine Primera División	29	0	0	0	6 (Note: Appearance(s) in Copa Libertadores)	0	2 (Note: One appearance in Torneos de Verano, One appearance in Supercopa Argentina)	0	37	0
River Plate	2017–18	Argentine Primera División	3	0	—		—		—		3	0
River Plate	Total		36	0	6	0	8	0	4	0	54	0
Atlético Tucumán (loan)	2017–18	Argentine Primera División	13	0	0	0	5	0	1	0	19	0
Tigre (loan)	2018–19	Argentine Primera División	10	0	—		—		—		10	0
Unión La Calera (loan)	2019	Chilean Primera División	22	0	5	0	4 (Note: Appearance(s) in Copa Sudamericana)	0	—		31	0
O'Higgins (loan)	2020	Chilean Primera División	33	0	—		—		—		33	0
O'Higgins (loan)	2021	Chilean Primera División	9	0	4	0	—		—		13	0
O'Higgins (loan)	Total		42	0	4	0	—		—		46	0
San Lorenzo (loan)	2021	Argentine Primera División	0	0	—		—		—		0	0
San Lorenzo (loan)	2022	Argentine Primera División	18	0	1	0	—		0	0	19	0
San Lorenzo (loan)	2023	Argentine Primera División	36	0	5	0	10	0	—		51	0
San Lorenzo (loan)	Total		54	0	6	0	10	0	0	0	70	0
Granada (loan)	2023–24	La Liga	17	0	—		—		—		17	0
Rayo Vallecano (loan)	2024–25	La Liga	32	0	0	0	—		—		32	0
Rayo Vallecano	2025–26	La Liga	34	0	0	0	14 (Note: Appearance(s) in UEFA Conference League)	0	—		48	0
Rayo Vallecano	2026–27	La Liga	2	0	0	0	—		—		2	0
Rayo Vallecano	Rayo Vallecano total		36	0	0	0	14	0	—		50	0
Career total			262	0	21	0	40	0	5	0	329	0

== Honours ==
River Plate

- Copa Sudamericana: 2014
- Copa Libertadores: 2015
- Recopa Sudamericana: 2016
- Copa Argentina: 2015–16, 2016–17
- FIFA Club World Cup runner-up: 2015

Rayo Vallecano

- UEFA Conference League runner-up: 2025–26

Argentina U17

- South American Under-17 Football Championship: 2013

Argentina U20

- South American Youth Football Championship: 2015

Individual

- Argentine Primera División Team of the Season: 2023
