= Tomás Andrade =

Argentine footballer

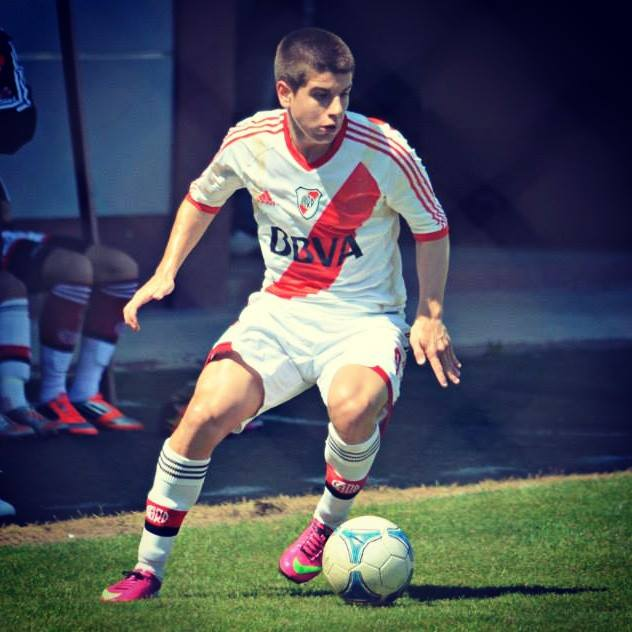
- Andrade playing for River Plate in 2013

Personal information
- Full name: Tomás Gustavo Andrade
- Date of birth: 16 November 1996 (age 29)
- Place of birth: Temperley, Argentina
- Height: 1.75 m (5 ft 9 in)
- Positions: Attacking midfielder; winger

Team information
- Current team: Al-Quwa Al-Jawiya
- Number: 23

Youth career
- 2004–2012: Lanús
- 2012–2016: River Plate
- 2015–2016: → Bournemouth (loan)

Senior career*
Years	Team	Apps	(Gls)
2016–2021	River Plate	21	(0)
2018	→ Atlético Mineiro (loan)	26	(3)
2019	→ Athletico Paranaense (loan)	12	(0)
2020–2021	→ Argentinos Juniors (loan)	4	(0)
2021	Sud América	29	(8)
2022–2023	Audax Italiano	18	(1)
2023	Botafogo-SP	10	(0)
2023–2024	Montevideo Wanderers	9	(1)
2024	Torreense	1	(0)
2024–2025	Sud América		
2025–2026	Club Always Ready		
2026	FC Cajamarca		
2026–	Al-Quwa Al-Jawiya	4	(0)

International career^{‡}
2013	Argentina U17	8	(3)
- * Club domestic league appearances and goals as of 20 June 2024 ‡ National team caps and goals as of 28 December 2022

Tomás Gustavo Andrade (born 16 November 1996) is an Argentine professional footballer who plays as an attacking midfielder or winger for Iraq Stars League club Al-Quwa Al-Jawiya.

== Career ==
=== Early career ===
Born in Temperley, Buenos Aires, Andrade started playing at age six for Club Parque. In 2004, he joined the youth ranks of Lanús. In 2007, he traveled to Spain and had trials at Atlético Madrid and FC Barcelona, but ultimately decided to return to Lanús where he signed his first contract. After leaving Lanús in late 2011, Andrade joined River Plate in 2012 and signed a contract with them in December of that year. In 2013, he was elected the best player of the La Comunidad de Madrid under-17 tournament won by River. Also in 2013, he received call-ups for the Argentina under-17 national team.

In September 2015, Andrade was loaned to newly promoted Premier League club Bournemouth and joined the club's under-21s squad.

=== River Plate ===
Andrade returned to River Plate in early 2016 and made his professional debut in 30 April of that year against Vélez Sarsfield in the Primera División. He appeared in both legs of the 2016 Recopa Sudamericana and was part of the winning campaigns of the 2015–16 and 2016–17 Copa Argentina.

==== Atlético Mineiro (loan) ====
On 24 January 2018, Andrade joined Brazilian club Atlético Mineiro on a year-long loan deal which included an optional buyout clause. He scored his first professional goal on 7 June 2018, in a 3–1 derby win over América.

==== Athletico Paranaense (loan) ====
After his time with Atlético Mineiro, Andrade joined Athletico Paranaense on 25 January 2019 on a one-year loan from River Plate.

=== Torreense ===
On 22 January 2024, Andrade left Montevideo Wanderers and signed a one-and-a-half-year contract with Liga Portugal 2 club Torreense.

== Honours ==
River Plate

- Copa Argentina: 2015–16, 2016–17
- Recopa Sudamericana: 2016

Athletico Paranaense

- J.League Cup / Copa Sudamericana Championship: 2019
