= Arturo Mina =

Ecuadorian footballer (born 1990)

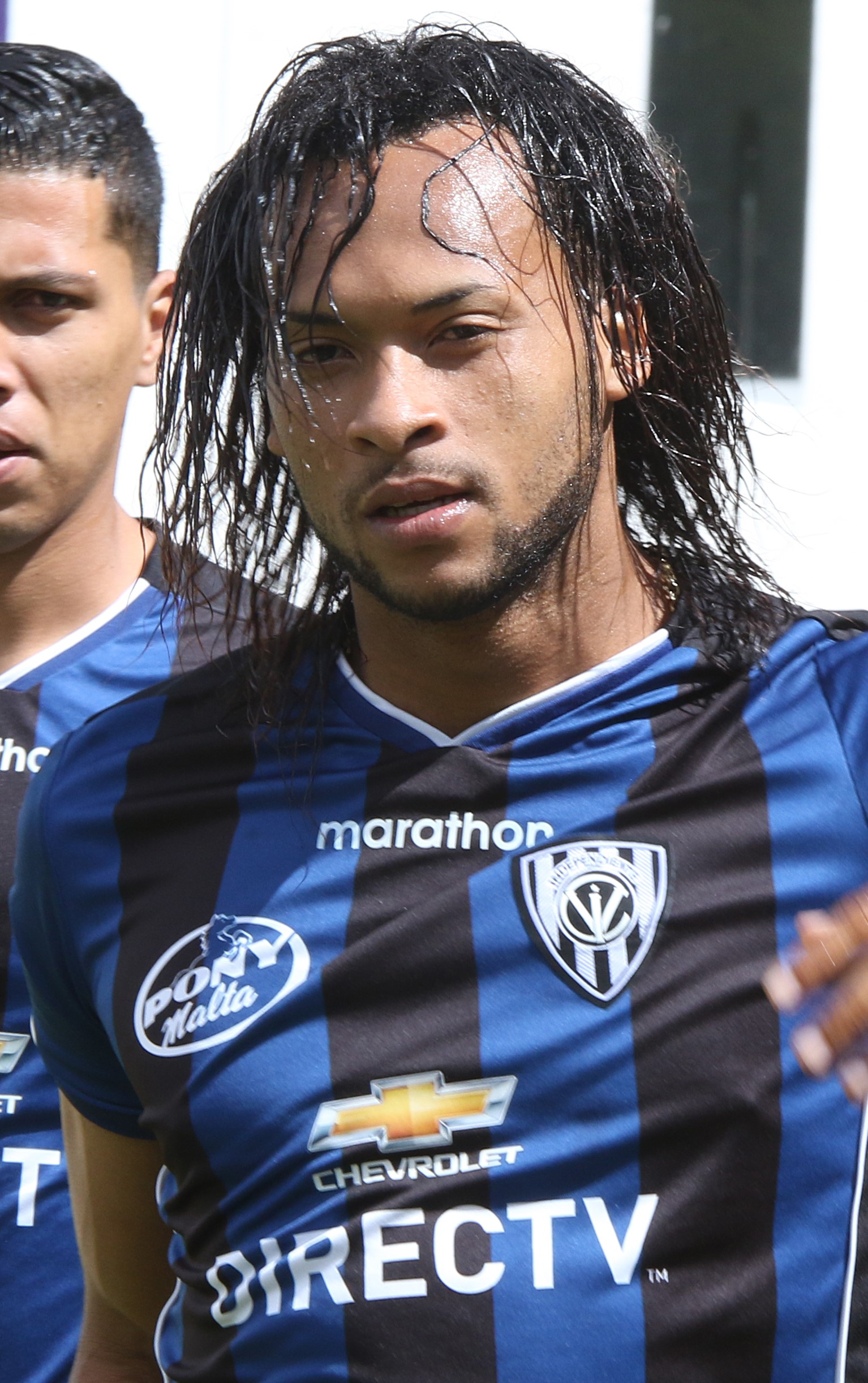
- Mina with Independiente DV in 2016

Personal information
- Full name: Arturo Rafael Mina Meza
- Date of birth: 8 October 1990 (age 36)
- Place of birth: Río Verde Canton, Ecuador
- Height: 1.89 m (6 ft 2 1/2 in)
- Position: Centre back

Youth career
- 2007–2008: Spencer
- 2008: Club Deportivo Puyo
- 2008–2010: SD Municipal

Senior career*
Years	Team	Apps	(Gls)
2010	UTE	35	(2)
2011–2013	Macará	35	(0)
2013–2016	Independiente DV	67	(5)
2016–2017	River Plate	12	(1)
2017–2020	Yeni Malatyaspor	70	(4)
2021	BB Erzurumspor	9	(0)
2022	Mushuc Runa	13	(0)
2023	Palmaflor del Trópico	17	(0)

International career^{‡}
2014–2019	Ecuador	22	(1)
- * Club domestic league appearances and goals as of 21 December 2022 ‡ National team caps and goals as of 24 June 2019

Arturo Rafael Mina Meza (born 8 October 1990) is an Ecuadorian footballer who plays as a defender.

Mina was called up for the 2015 Copa América making the cut for the final 23 this time around. On 15 November 2016, Mina scored his first international goal ever for Ecuador in a 2018 FIFA World Cup Qualification match against Venezuela, the first goal in a 3–0 victory for Ecuador.

== International career ==
=== International goals ===
No.	Date	Location	Opposition	Score	Result	Competition
1.	15 November 2016	Estadio Olímpico Atahualpa, Quito, Ecuador	Venezuela	1–0	3–0	2018 FIFA World Cup qualification

== Honours ==
Independiente del Valle

- Copa Libertadores runner-up: 2016

River Plate

- Recopa Sudamericana: 2016
- Copa Argentina: 2015–16

Individual

- El País (Uruguay) Copa Sudamericana 2016 Best 11: 2016
