= Denis Rodríguez =

Argentine footballer

Personal information
- Full name: Denis Emanuel Rodríguez
- Date of birth: 21 March 1996 (age 30)
- Place of birth: Rosario, Argentina
- Height: 1.72 m (5 ft 8 in)
- Position: Attacking midfielder

Team information
- Current team: Amora
- Number: 6

Youth career
- –2015: Newell's Old Boys

Senior career*
Years	Team	Apps	(Gls)
2015–2021	Newell's Old Boys	43	(2)
2016–2017	→ River Plate (loan)	2	(0)
2018	→ Belgrano (loan)	8	(0)
2022–	Amora	1	(0)
- * Club domestic league appearances and goals as of 18:23, 12 September 2022 (UTC)

Denis Emanuel Rodríguez (born 21 March 1996) is an Argentine footballer who plays as an attacking midfielder for Amora.

== Club career ==
Born in Rosario, Santa Fe, Rodríguez is a youth exponent from hometown club Newell's Old Boys. He made his Argentine Primera División on 12 July 2015 against Racing Club de Avellaneda in a 3–0 home win. On 28 September he scored his first goal in a 2–0 win at Estudiantes de La Plata.

In July 2018, Rodríguez was loaned for a year to Club Atlético Belgrano for a net fee of US$50,000, with the option to purchase 50% of his economic rights for around $2.12 million. Halfway through his loan to the club from Córdoba, having played only eight games, his deal was rescinded by new manager Diego Osella.

During a training session in late August 2020, Rodríguez suffered a ruptured Achilles tendon, an injury that was estimated to keep him out for 6–8 months. While recovering from his injury, in June 2021 Rodríguez was involved in a road accident after colliding with a police motorcycle. The police motorcycle involved was in pursuit of a third party before colliding with Rodríguez's car. As of February 2022, he had still not returned to play for Newell's.

On 22 August 2022, Rodríguez signed for Portuguese Liga 3 side Amora.

== Personal life ==
He is the twin brother of Alexis Rodríguez and cousin of Maxi Rodríguez. All three played together for Newell's.
