= 2018–19 Club Atlético River Plate season =

River Plate
2018–19 season
- President: Rodolfo D'Onfrio
- Coach: Marcelo Gallardo
- Stadium: Estadio Monumental
- Primera División: 4th
- Copa Argentina: Semi-finals
- Copa Libertadores: Winners
- FIFA Club World Cup: Third place
- Supercopa Argentina: Winners
- Biggest win: River 7–0 Central Norte
- Biggest defeat: Atlético Tucumán 3–0 River
Home colours	Away colours

The 2018–19 season was Club Atlético River Plate's 8th consecutive season in the top-flight of Argentine football. The season covers the period from 1 July 2018 to 30 June 2019.

== Squad Summer ==
Note: Flags indicate national team as defined under FIFA eligibility rules; some limited exceptions apply. Players may hold more than one non-FIFA nationality.

No.	Pos.	Nation	Player
1	GK	ARG	Franco Armani
2	DF	ARG	Jonatan Maidana (Vice-captain)
4	DF	PAR	Jorge Moreira
5	MF	ARG	Bruno Zuculini
6	DF	ARG	Luciano Lollo
7	FW	URU	Rodrigo Mora (3rd captain)
8	MF	COL	Juan Fernando Quintero
9	FW	ARG	Julián Álvarez
10	MF	ARG	Pity Martínez
11	MF	URU	Nicolás De La Cruz
13	MF	ARG	Santiago Sosa
14	GK	ARG	Germán Lux
15	MF	ARG	Exequiel Palacios
16	DF	ARG	Kevin Sibille

No.	Pos.	Nation	Player
18	MF	URU	Camilo Mayada
19	FW	COL	Rafael Santos Borré
20	DF	ARG	Milton Casco
21	MF	ARG	Cristian Ferreira
22	DF	ARG	Javier Pinola
23	MF	ARG	Leonardo Ponzio (Captain)
24	MF	ARG	Enzo Pérez
25	GK	ARG	Enrique Bologna
26	MF	ARG	Ignacio Fernández
27	FW	ARG	Lucas Pratto
28	DF	ARG	Lucas Martínez Quarta (4th captain)
29	DF	ARG	Gonzalo Montiel
32	FW	ARG	Ignacio Scocco
36	DF	ARG	Nahuel Gallardo

== Squad Winter ==
Note: Flags indicate national team as defined under FIFA eligibility rules; some limited exceptions apply. Players may hold more than one non-FIFA nationality.

No.	Pos.	Nation	Player
1	GK	ARG	Franco Armani (3rd captain)
2	DF	PAR	Robert Rojas
4	DF	ARG	Fabrizio Angileri
5	MF	ARG	Bruno Zuculini
6	DF	ARG	Luciano Lollo
7	FW	ARG	Matias Suarez
8	MF	COL	Jorge Carrascal
9	FW	ARG	Julián Álvarez
10	MF	COL	Juan Fernando Quintero
11	MF	URU	Nicolás De La Cruz
13	MF	ARG	Santiago Sosa
14	GK	ARG	Germán Lux
15	MF	ARG	Exequiel Palacios
16	DF	ARG	Kevin Sibille

No.	Pos.	Nation	Player
18	MF	URU	Camilo Mayada
19	FW	COL	Rafael Santos Borré
20	DF	ARG	Milton Casco
21	MF	ARG	Cristian Ferreira
22	DF	ARG	Javier Pinola (Vice-captain)
23	MF	ARG	Leonardo Ponzio (Captain)
24	MF	ARG	Enzo Pérez
25	GK	ARG	Enrique Bologna
26	MF	ARG	Ignacio Fernández
27	FW	ARG	Lucas Pratto
28	DF	ARG	Lucas Martínez Quarta (4th captain)
29	DF	ARG	Gonzalo Montiel
32	FW	ARG	Ignacio Scocco
36	DF	ARG	Nahuel Gallardo

== Transfers ==
=== Out Summer ===
Number	Pos.	Name	To
3	DF	(Uruguay) Marcelo Saracchi	(Germany) RB Leipzig
16	MF	(Argentina) Ariel Rojas	(Argentina) San Lorenzo de Almagro
	MF	(Argentina) Nicolas Bertolo	(Argentina) Club Atletico Banfield
	FW	(Argentina) Juan Cruz Kaprof	(Argentina) Atletico Tucuman

=== In Winter ===
Number	Pos.	Name	From
2	DF	(Paraguay) Robert Rojas	(Paraguay) Club Guarani
4	DF	(Argentina) Fabrizio Angileri	(Argentina) Godoy Cruz
7	FW	(Argentina) Matias Suarez	(Argentina) Club Atletico Belgrano
8	MF	(Colombia) Jorge Carrascal	(Ukraine) FC Karpaty Lviv

=== Out Winter ===
Number	Pos.	Name	From
2	DF	(Argentina) Jonatan Maidana	(Mexico) Club Deportivo Toluca
7	FW	(Uruguay) Rodrigo Mora	Retired
10	MF	(Argentina) Pity Martinez	(United States) Atlanta United

=== Loan Out ===
Number	Pos.	Name	To
4	DF	(Paraguay) Jorge Moreira	(United States) Portland Timbers
9	FW	(Chile) Marcelo Larrondo	(Chile) Union La Calera
17	MF	(Argentina) Carlos Auzqui	(Argentina) Club Atletico Huracan
21	MF	(Argentina) Iván Rossi	(Argentina) Club Atletico Banfield

== Friendlies ==
Win Draw Loss

=== Winter pre-season ===
17 July 2018 Friendly	River Plate (Argentina)	0–0	(Colombia) Independiente Medellín	Buenos Aires, Argentina
18:15		Report		Stadium: Estadio Monumental Antonio Vespucio Liberti

=== Mid-season ===
9 September 2018 Friendly	Talleres Córdoba (Argentina)	3–1	(Argentina) River Plate	Córdoba, Argentina
18:15	N. Bustos 37'; J. C. Komar 60'; M. Valiente 90+2'	Report	J. Álvarez 72'	Stadium: Estadio Mario Alberto Kempes

== Competitions ==
=== Overall ===
Competition	First match	Last match	Starting round	Final position	Record							
Competition	First match	Last match	Starting round	Final position	Pld	W	D	L	GF	GA	GD	Win %
Primera División	12 August 2018	7 April 2019	Matchday 1	Matchday 25	25	13	6	6	42	21	+21	52.00
Copa Argentina	22 July 2018	28 November 2018	Round of 64	Semifinals	6	5	0	1	18	4	+14	83.33
Copa Libertadores	22 February 2018	9 December 2018	Group stage	Winners	14	7	6	1	19	8	+11	50.00
FIFA Club World Cup	18 December 2018	22 December 2018	Semi-Finals	Third-place	2	1	0	1	6	2	+4	50.00
Total					47	26	12	9	85	35	+50	55.32

Last updated: 19 December 2018
Source: Competitions

==== Results summary ====
Overall								Home						Away					
Pld	W	D	L	GF	GA	GD	Pts	W	D	L	GF	GA	GD	W	D	L	GF	GA	GD
11	5	4	2	16	7	+9	19	3	2	0	8	3	+5	2	2	2	8	4	+4

=== Results by round ===
Matchday	1	2	3	4	5	6	7	8	9	10	11	12	13	14	15	16	17	18	19	20	21	22	23	24	25	26	27	28	29	30	31	32	33	34	35	36	37	38
Ground	A	H	H	A	H	A	A	A	H	A	H	A	H	H	A	H																						
Result	D	D	D	D	W	W	W	L	W	L	P	P	W		P	P																						
Position	11	18	20	18	19	11	5	7	11	7	10	11	14																									

Updated to match(es) played on 21 December 2018. Source:
A = Away; H = Home; W = Win; D = Draw; L = Loss; P = Postponed

=== Primera División ===
==== League table ====
Pos	Team	Pld	W	D	L	GF	GA	GD	Pts	Qualification
2	Defensa y Justicia	25	15	8	2	33	18	+15	53	Qualification for Copa Libertadores group stage
3	Boca Juniors	25	15	6	4	42	18	+24	51	Qualification for Copa Libertadores group stage
4	River Plate	25	13	6	6	42	21	+21	45	Qualification for Copa Libertadores group stage (Note: River Plate qualified for the Copa Libertadores group stage by winning the 2018–19 Copa Argentina.)
5	Atlético Tucumán	25	12	6	7	36	29	+7	42	Qualification for Copa Libertadores second stage
6	Vélez Sarsfield	25	11	7	7	34	25	+9	40	Qualification for Copa Sudamericana first stage

Source: AFA
Rules for classification: 1) points; 2) play-off (only if needed to decide championship); 3) goal difference; 4) goals scored; 5) head-to-head points; 6) head-to-head goal difference; 7) head-to-head goals scored.
