= 2019–20 Club Atlético River Plate season =

River Plate
2019–20 season
- President: Rodolfo D'Onofrio
- Manager: Marcelo Gallardo
- Stadium: Estadio Monumental Antonio Vespucio Liberti
- Primera División: 2nd
- Copa Argentina: Winners
- Copa de la Superliga: Cancelled
- 2019 Copa Libertadores: Runners-up
- Top goalscorer: Rafael Santos Borré (12)
- Biggest win: River 8–0 Binacional
- Biggest defeat: LDU Quito 3–0 River

The 2019–20 season was River Plate's 9th consecutive season in the top division of Argentine football. In addition to the Primera División, the club competed in the Copa Argentina, Copa de la Superliga and Copa Libertadores.

The season covers the period from 1 July 2019 to 30 June 2020.

== Review ==
=== Pre-season ===
Zacarías Morán agreed a loan move to Chacarita Juniors on 18 June 2019. Maximiliano Velazco's loan with Defensores de Belgrano, which was set to expire on 30 June, was extended on 20 June. Camilo Mayada headed to Mexico with Atlético San Luis on 22 June. River Plate toured the United States for pre-season, with the first match being played on 27 June against Ventura County Fusion at the Wallis Annenberg Stadium in Los Angeles as they ran out 5–0 winners; with Lucas Beltrán netting twice. On that same day, Héctor Martínez departed on loan to Defensa y Justicia. Their second friendly took place on 28 June, as they scored five again after defeating Guadalajara of Liga MX in game one of the Colossus Cup. 29 June saw Alexander Barboza go to Independiente.

Numerous loans from the previous campaign officially expired on and around 30 June. River met Ventura County Fushion of USL League Two for a secondary match-up on 4 July, with Jorge Carrascal scoring four times in a 7–0 victory. Luciano Lollo was loaned to Banfield on 6 July. On matchday two of the Colossus Cup, River beat another Mexican team in América with goals from Julián Álvarez and Cristian Ferreira.

=== July ===
Gimnasia y Esgrima (M) were defeated in the Copa Argentina R32 on 16 July, though it took a 4–5 penalty shoot-out win to do so. Carlos Auzqui went off on loan to Lanús on 17 July. On 23 July, River Plate met Brazilian club Cruzeiro in the first leg of a Copa Libertadores round of sixteen encounter, as the two played out a goalless draw at Estadio Monumental. River travelled to Argentinos Juniors in game one of the 2019–20 Primera División, subsequently coming away with a point. On 30 July, after they again drew 0–0 with Cruzeiro in the Copa Libertadores, River Plate advanced to the next round following a penalty shoot-out victory.

=== August ===
On 1 August, Joaquín Arzura headed out on loan to Huracán. Hours later, River announced their first signing of the new campaign as Paulo Díaz arrived from Al-Ahli of the Saudi Professional League. River built upon their point on the opening day in the Primera División over Argentinos Juniors with a 3–0 win versus Lanús on 4 August on home soil. Alan Marcel Picazzo joined Villa Dálmine on loan on 8 August. River beat All Boys 7–0 and 5–1 in friendlies on 9 August, with Matías Suárez netting a hat-trick in the former while Ignacio Scocco scored a brace in the latter. 10 August saw Santiago Vera leave River Plate, as the midfielder agreed terms on a move to Paraguayan Primera División outfit Olimpia. Colo-Colo revealed the loan signing of Iván Rossi on 13 August.

River, for the first time since 1962, put six goals past reigning champions Racing Club away from home in the league on 17 August. River Plate defeated Cerro Porteño in the first leg of a Copa Libertadores quarter-final on 22 August, winning 2–0 after Ignacio Fernández and Rafael Santos Borré netted spot-kicks. River's first league loss came three days later, as Talleres won at the Estadio Monumental Antonio Vespucio Liberti for the first time in twenty-nine years. On 29 August, River progressed to the Copa Libertadores semi-finals after beating Paraguayan side Cerro Porteño 3–1 on aggregate, having drawn 1–1 in the second leg in Asunción.

=== September ===
River opened September with a Superclásico at home to Boca Juniors, which ended drawn after no goals were scored. On 22 September, they got their second loss of the season, losing 2–1 at home to Vélez Sarsfield. They ended the month with a 2–0 victory against Gimnasia.

=== October ===
On the first day of October, River beat rivals Boca in a tense first leg of the Libertadores semi-finals 2–0 with goals from Borre and Fernandez. Ten days later, they beat Primera Nacional club Almagro in the Copa Argentina quarter-final, then followed this up with a 3–3 draw against Arsenal. On 22 October, River lost the second leg of the Libertadores semi-finals against Boca 1–0, but progressed to the final 2–1 on aggregate. River ended the month with a 2–1 victory against Colon.

=== November ===
On 14 November, River beat Primera Nacional club and fellow Buenos Aires club Estudiantes de Buenos Aires in the Copa Argentina semi-final. A week later they lost the Copa Libertadores final against Flamengo. River were leading 1-0 until the 88th minute of the game through a goal from Santos Borre, but two goals from Gabriel Barbosa in six minutes gave Flamengo their second Copa Libertadores. River ended the month on a positive note, with a 2–3 away victory vs Newell's Old Boys.

=== December ===
December began with a home loss against rivals San Lorenzo. Five days later, River beat Central Córdoba 3–0 in the Copa Argentina Final, in their last game of 2019.

=== January ===
River Plate began the new year with a 2–1 victory against rivals Independiente at Estadio Libertadores de América. They followed this victory with another away victory against Godoy Cruz.

== Squad ==
Squad No.	Nationality	Name	Position(s)	Date of birth (age)	Signed from
Goalkeepers
1	Argentina	Franco Armani	GK	16 October 1986 (age 40)	Atlético Nacional
12	Argentina	Ezequiel Centurión	GK	20 May 1997 (age 29)	Academy
14	Argentina	Germán Lux	GK	7 June 1982 (age 44)	Deportivo La Coruña
25	Argentina	Enrique Bologna	GK	13 February 1982 (age 44)	Gimnasia y Esgrima (LP)
Defenders
2	Paraguay	Robert Rojas	RB	30 April 1996 (age 30)	Guaraní
4	Argentina	Fabrizio Angileri	LB	15 March 1994 (age 32)	Godoy Cruz (loan)
6	Chile	Paulo Díaz	CB	25 August 1994 (age 32)	Al-Ahli
16	Argentina	Kevin Sibille	CB	15 September 1998 (age 28)	Academy
17	Argentina	Elías López	RB	8 July 2000 (age 26)	Academy
20	Argentina	Milton Casco	RB	11 April 1988 (age 38)	Newell's Old Boys
22	Argentina	Javier Pinola	LB	24 February 1983 (age 43)	Rosario Central
28	Argentina	Lucas Martínez Quarta	CB	10 May 1996 (age 30)	Academy
29	Argentina	Gonzalo Montiel	CB	1 January 1997 (age 29)	Academy
36	Argentina	Nahuel Gallardo	LB	9 May 1998 (age 28)	Academy
Midfielders
5	Argentina	Bruno Zuculini	CM	20 April 1993 (age 33)	Verona
8	Colombia	Jorge Carrascal	AM	25 May 1998 (age 28)	Karpaty Lviv (loan)
10	Colombia	Juan Fernando Quintero	AM	18 January 1993 (age 33)	Porto
11	Uruguay	Nicolás De La Cruz	AM	1 June 1997 (age 29)	Liverpool
13	Argentina	Santiago Sosa	CM	3 May 1999 (age 27)	Academy
15	Argentina	Exequiel Palacios	AM	5 October 1998 (age 28)	Academy
21	Argentina	Cristian Ferreira	LM	12 September 1999 (age 27)	Academy
23	Argentina	Leonardo Ponzio	CM	29 January 1982 (age 44)	Zaragoza
24	Argentina	Enzo Pérez	RM	22 February 1986 (age 40)	Valencia
26	Argentina	Ignacio Fernández	AM	12 January 1990 (age 36)	Gimnasia y Esgrima (LP)
37	Argentina	Enzo Fernández	CM	17 January 2001 (age 25)	Academy
39	Argentina	Hernán López	MF	7 September 2000 (age 26)	Academy
Forwards
7	Argentina	Matías Suárez	LW	9 May 1988 (age 38)	Belgrano
9	Argentina	Julián Álvarez	CF	31 January 2000 (age 26)	Academy
18	Argentina	Benjamín Rollheiser	FW	24 March 2000 (age 26)	Academy
19	Colombia	Rafael Santos Borré	CF	15 September 1995 (age 31)	Atlético Madrid
27	Argentina	Lucas Pratto	CF	4 June 1988 (age 38)	São Paulo
32	Argentina	Ignacio Scocco	RW	29 May 1985 (age 41)	Newell's Old Boys
34	Argentina	Lucas Beltrán	CF	29 March 2001 (age 25)	Academy
35	Argentina	Federico Girotti	CF	2 June 1999 (age 27)	Academy
Out on loan					Loaned to
33	Argentina	Héctor Martínez	CB	21 January 1998 (age 28)	Defensa y Justicia
38	Argentina	Alan Marcel Picazzo	FW	21 June 1999 (age 27)	Villa Dálmine
	Argentina	Tomás Andrade	AM	16 November 1996 (age 29)	Argentinos Juniors
	Argentina	Joaquín Arzura	CM	18 May 1993 (age 33)	Huracán
	Argentina	Carlos Auzqui	AM	16 March 1991 (age 35)	Lanús
	Argentina	Augusto Batalla	GK	30 April 1996 (age 30)	Unión La Calera
	Argentina Chile	Marcelo Larrondo	CF	16 August 1988 (age 38)	Unión La Calera
	Argentina	Luciano Lollo	CB	29 March 1987 (age 39)	Banfield
	Argentina	Zacarías Morán	CM	22 February 1996 (age 30)	Chacarita Juniors
	Paraguay	Jorge Moreira	RM	1 February 1990 (age 36)	Portland Timbers
	Argentina	Matías Moya	AM	26 March 1998 (age 28)	Banfield
	Argentina	Luis Olivera	LB	24 October 1998 (age 28)	River Plate
	Argentina	Iván Rossi	CM	1 November 1993 (age 33)	Colo-Colo
	Argentina	Maximiliano Velazco	GK	8 March 1995 (age 31)	Defensores de Belgrano

== Transfers ==
Domestic transfer windows:
3 July 2019 to 24 September 2019
20 January 2020 to 19 February 2020.

=== Transfers in ===
Date from	Position	Nationality	Name	From	Ref.
1 August 2019	CB	Chile	Paulo Díaz	Al-Ahli	

=== Transfers out ===
Date from	Position	Nationality	Name	To	Ref.
22 June 2019	AM	Uruguay	Camilo Mayada	Atlético San Luis	
3 July 2019 (Note: Deal agreed on 29 June 2019)	CB	Argentina	Alexander Barboza	Independiente	
10 August 2019	RM	Argentina	Santiago Vera	Olimpia	

=== Loans out ===
Start date	Position	Nationality	Name	To	End date	Ref.
3 July 2019 (Note: Deal agreed on 18 June 2019)	CM	Argentina	Zacarías Morán	Chacarita Juniors	30 June 2020	
3 July 2019 (Note: Deal agreed on 27 June 2019)	CB	Argentina	Héctor Martínez	Defensa y Justicia	30 June 2020	
6 July 2019	CB	Argentina	Luciano Lollo	Banfield	30 June 2020	
17 July 2019	AM	Argentina	Carlos Auzqui	Lanús	30 June 2020	
1 August 2019	CM	Argentina	Joaquín Arzura	Huracán	30 June 2020	
8 August 2019	FW	Argentina	Alan Marcel Picazzo	Villa Dálmine	30 June 2020	
13 August 2019	CM	Argentina	Iván Rossi	Colo-Colo	30 June 2020	

== Friendlies ==
=== Pre-season ===
In June 2019, River Plate were announced as one of four clubs, alongside Guadalajara, América and Boca Juniors, that would take part in the inaugural Colossus Cup in the United States. They were scheduled to face the Liga MX duo at SDCCU Stadium in San Diego on 28 June and at CenturyLink Field in Seattle on 6 July. A day before facing Guadalajara, the club took on USL League Two side Ventura County Fusion in a friendly match. They met the American outfit again on 4 July.

Win Draw Loss

27 June 2019 Friendly	River Plate	5–0	Ventura County Fusion	Los Angeles, United States
	J. Carrascal; L. Beltrán; C. Ferreira; B. Rollheiser	River Plate; TyC Sports		Stadium: Wallis Annenberg Stadium

28 June 2019 Colossus Cup: 1	Guadalajara	1–5	River Plate	San Diego, United States
20:15 GMT-7	M. Ortiz 63'	River Plate; Vavel	N. De La Cruz 27', 46'; R. Borré 37'; I. Fernández 68'; B. Rollheiser 76'	Stadium: SDCCU Stadium; Referee: Kyle Burkhardt (United States)

4 July 2019 Friendly	River Plate	7–0	Ventura County Fusion	Los Angeles, United States
	J. Carrascal; B. Rollheiser; N. Gallardo; E. Pérez	River Plate; AS		Stadium: Wallis Annenberg Stadium

6 July 2019 Colossus Cup: 2	América	0–2	River Plate	Seattle, United States
17:00 GMT-7		River Plate; El Comercio	J. Álvarez 15'; C. Ferreira 20'	Stadium: CenturyLink Field; Referee: Brad Jensen (United States)

=== Mid-season ===
River Plate and All Boys (Primera B Nacional) scheduled a friendly with each other for 9 August, in Ezeiza at River Camp.

Win Draw Loss

9 August 2019 Friendly	River Plate	7–0	All Boys	Ezeiza, Argentina
09:00 GMT-3	M. Suárez; E. Palacios; I. Fernández; L. Martínez Quarta; J. Carrascal			Stadium: River Camp; Attendance: 0 (Note: Behind closed doors.)

9 August 2019 Friendly	River Plate	5–1	All Boys	Ezeiza, Argentina
	I. Scocco; B. Rollheiser; C. Ferreira; J. Álvarez		F. Cardozo	Stadium: River Camp; Attendance: 0 (Note: Behind closed doors.)

== Competitions ==
=== Primera División ===
==== League table ====
Pos	Team	Pld	W	D	L	GF	GA	GD	Pts	Qualification
1	Boca Juniors (C)	23	14	6	3	35	8	+27	48	Qualification for Copa Libertadores group stage
2	River Plate	23	14	5	4	41	18	+23	47	
3	Vélez Sarsfield	23	11	6	6	27	14	+13	39	
4	Racing	23	9	12	2	28	23	+5	39	
5	Argentinos Juniors	23	10	9	4	22	17	+5	39	

Source: AFA
Rules for classification: 1) points; 2) play-off (only if needed to decide championship); 3) goal difference; 4) goals scored; 5) head-to-head points; 6) head-to-head goal difference; 7) head-to-head goals scored.
(C) Champions

==== Relegation table ====
Pos	Team	2017–18 Pts	2018–19 Pts	2019–20 Pts	Total Pts	Total Pld	Avg	Relegation
3	Arsenal	0	0	9	9	5	1.8	
4	Defensa y Justicia	44	53	4	101	57	1.772	
5	River Plate	45	45	8	98	57	1.719	
6	Independiente	46	38	6	90	56	1.607	
7	Godoy Cruz	56	32	3	91	57	1.596	

Source: AFA

==== Results summary ====
Overall								Home						Away					
Pld	W	D	L	GF	GA	GD	Pts	W	D	L	GF	GA	GD	W	D	L	GF	GA	GD
23	14	5	4	41	18	+23	47	5	2	4	12	7	+5	9	3	0	29	11	+18

Last updated: 7 March 2020.
Source: Soccerway

==== Matches ====
The fixtures for the 2019–20 campaign were released on 10 July.

Win Draw Loss

27 July 2019 1	Argentinos Juniors	1–1	River Plate	Buenos Aires, Argentina
20:00 GMT-3	D. Batallini 19'	River Plate; Infobae; Soccerway	J. Carrascal 85'	Stadium: Estadio Diego Armando Maradona; Referee: Fernando Rapallini (Argentina)

4 August 2019 2	River Plate	3–0	Lanús	Buenos Aires, Argentina
17:45 GMT-3	R. Borré 23' (pen.); M. Suárez 30', 87'	River Plate; Infobae; Soccerway		Stadium: Estadio Monumental; Referee: Germán Delfino (Argentina)

17 August 2019 3	Racing Club	1–6	River Plate	Avellaneda, Argentina
20:00 GMT-3	A. Solari 3'	River Plate; Infobae; Soccerway	R. Borré 35', 36'; M. Suárez 38'; I. Fernández 64' (pen.); N. De La Cruz 68'; I. Scocco 71'	Stadium: Estadio Presidente Juan Domingo Perón; Referee: Patricio Loustau (Argentina)

25 August 2019 4	River Plate	0–1	Talleres	Buenos Aires, Argentina
17:45 GMT-3		River Plate; Infobae; Soccerway	N. Bustos 63'	Stadium: Estadio Monumental; Referee: Néstor Pitana (Argentina)

1 September 2019 5	River Plate	0–0	Boca Juniors	Buenos Aires, Argentina
17:00 GMT-3		River Plate; Infobae; Soccerway		Stadium: Estadio Monumental Antonio Vespucio Liberti; Referee: Fernando Rapallini (Argentina)

14 September 2019 6	Huracán	0–4	River Plate	Buenos Aires, Argentina
				Stadium: Estadio Tomás Adolfo Ducó

22 September 2019 7	River Plate	1–2	Velez Sarsfield	Buenos Aires, Argentina

28 September 2019 8	Gimnasia (LP)	0–2	River Plate	La Plata, Argentina

6 October 2019 9	River Plate	2–0	Patronato	Buenos Aires, Argentina

18 October 2019 10	Arsenal	3–3	River Plate	Sarandi, Argentina

29 October 2019 11	River Plate	2–1	Colon

2 November 2019 12	Aldosivi	1–2	River Plate

10 November 2019 13	River Plate	0–1	Rosario Central

30 November 2019 14	Newell's Old Boys	2–3	River Plate

8 December 2019 15	River Plate	0–1	San Lorenzo

19 January 2020 16	Independinte	1–2	River Plate

25 January 2020 17	Godoy Cruz	0–1	River Plate

2 February 2020 18	River Plate	2–0	Central Cordoba

9 February 2020 19	Unión de Santa Fe	1–2	River Plate

16 February 2020 20	River Plate	1–0	Banfield	Buenos Aires, Argentina

23 February 2020 21	Estudiantes de La Plata	0–2	River Plate	La Plata, Argentina

29 February 2020 22	River Plate	1–1	Defensa y Justicia

7 March 2020 23	Atlético Tucumán	1–1	River Plate

=== Copa Argentina ===
River Plate began their cup run against Primera B Nacional side Gimnasia y Esgrima (M) on 16 July 2019, at the Estadio Único in Villa Mercedes. The game was narrow with River needing penalties to eliminate the ambitious second-tier club. In the round of 16, River disposed of Godoy Cruz courtesy of an own goal. In the quarter-finals, River beat another second-tier club, Club Almagro, on their way to the semi-finals. In the semi-finals they faced tournament surprise Estudiantes, beating them 2–0 and advancing to the final where they beat Central Cordoba 3–0.

Win Draw Loss

16 July 2019 R32	Gimnasia y Esgrima (M)	1–1 (4–5 p)	River Plate	Villa Mercedes, Argentina
21:10 GMT-3	R. Vera 70'	River Plate; Infobae; Soccerway	E. Palacios 66'	Stadium: Estadio Único; Referee: Andrés Merlos (Argentina)
	Penalties
	L. Aguirre (penalty scored); B. Zabaleta (penalty scored); T. Marchiori (penalty scored); B. Andrada (penalty missed); L. Carrizo (penalty scored)		I. Fernández (penalty scored); N. De La Cruz (penalty scored); C. Ferreira (penalty scored); R. Borré (penalty scored); B. Rollheiser (penalty scored)

18 September 2019 R16	Godoy Cruz	0–1	River Plate	Lanús, Argentina
21:10		Report	Varela 21' (o.g.)	Stadium: Ciudad de Lanús – Néstor Díaz Pérez; Referee: Facundo Tello

11 October 2019 QF	River Plate	2–0	Almagro	Mendoza, Argentina
20:30	Borré 6'; Scocco 57'	Report		Stadium: Malvinas Argentinas; Referee: Ariel Penel

14 November 2019 SF	River Plate	2–0	Estudiantes (BA)	Córdoba, Argentina
21:10	Pinola 45+2'; Palacios 90+5'	Report		Stadium: Mario Alberto Kempes; Referee: Mauro Vigliano

13 December 2019 F	Central Córdoba (SdE)	0–3	River Plate	Estadio Malvinas Argentinas, Mendoza, Argentina
21:10		Report	Scocco 30'; Fernández 67'; Álvarez 71'	Referee: Facundo Tello

=== Copa Libertadores ===
River Plate were drawn with Brazil's Cruzeiro in the Copa Libertadores round of 16, beating them on penalties after subsequent 0-0 draws. In the quarter-finals River beat Cerro Porteño 3-1 on aggregate. Local rivals Boca Juniors were disposed of in the semi-finals, in what was a rematch of the 2018 finals. River were paired up with Brazilian champions Flamengo in the final, who made a comeback in four minutes to take the title from River.

Win Draw Loss

23 July 2019 R16 L1	River Plate	0–0	Cruzeiro	Buenos Aires, Argentina
19:15 GMT-3		River Plate; Infobae; Soccerway		Stadium: Estadio Monumental Antonio Vespucio Liberti; Referee: Julio Bascuñán (Chile)

30 July 2019 R16 L2	Cruzeiro	0–0 (0–0 agg.) (2–4 p)	River Plate	Belo Horizonte, Brazil
19:15 GMT-3		River Plate; Infobae; Soccerway		Stadium: Mineirão; Referee: Roberto Tobar (Chile)
	Penalties
	Henrique (penalty missed); Fred (penalty scored); David (penalty missed); Robinho (penalty scored)		N. De La Cruz (penalty scored); G. Montiel (penalty scored); L. Martínez Quarta (penalty scored); R. Borré (penalty scored)

22 August 2019 QF L1	River Plate	2–0	Cerro Porteño	Buenos Aires, Argentina
19:15 GMT-3	I. Fernández 8' (pen.); R. Borré 65' (pen.)	River Plate; Infobae; Soccerway		Stadium: Estadio Monumental Antonio Vespucio Liberti; Referee: Víctor Carrillo (Peru)

29 August 2019 QF L2	Cerro Porteño	1–1 (1–3 agg.)	River Plate	Asunción, Paraguay
18:15 GMT-4	N. Haedo Valdez 8'	River Plate; Infobae; Soccerway	N. De La Cruz 52'	Stadium: Estadio General Pablo Rojas; Referee: Julio Bascuñán (Chile)

1 October 2019 SF L1	River Plate	2–0	Boca Juniors	Buenos Aires, Argentina
21:30 GMT-3				Stadium: Estadio Monumental Antonio Vespucio Liberti

22 October 2019 SF L1	Boca Juniors	1–0 (2–1 agg.)	River Plate	Buenos Aires, Argentina
21:30 GMT-3				Stadium: La Bombonera

23 November 2019 F	Flamengo	2–1	River Plate	Lima, Peru
15:00 UTC−5	Gabriel Barbosa 89', 90+2'		R. Borre 12'	Stadium: Estadio Monumental; Attendance: 78,573

==== 2020 Copa Libertadores ====
On 12 March 2020, CONMEBOL announced that the tournament would be suspended after matchday 2 due to the COVID-19 pandemic, with matches on matchday 3, originally scheduled for 17–19 March 2020, postponed to a later date. On 17 April 2020, CONMEBOL announced that the tournament would be suspended indefinitely, and no date had been set for its resumption. On 10 July 2020, CONMEBOL announced the new schedule for the remainder of the competition, with the updated fixtures announced on 26 August 2020 to begin with matchday 3 on 15 September 2020.

===== Group G =====
Pos	Team	Pld	W	D	L	GF	GA	GD	Pts	Qualification	RIV	LDQ	SPA	BIN
1	(Argentina) River Plate	6	4	1	1	21	6	+15	13	Round of 16	—	3–0	2–1	8–0
2	(Ecuador) LDU Quito	6	4	0	2	12	8	+4	12	Round of 16	3–0	—	4–2	4–0
3	(Brazil) São Paulo	6	2	1	3	14	11	+3	7	Copa Sudamericana	2–2	3–0	—	5–1
4	(Peru) Binacional	6	1	0	5	3	25	−22	3		0–6	0–1	2–1	—

Source: CONMEBOL

Win Draw Loss

4 March 2020 MD1	LDU Quito	3–0	River Plate	Estadio Rodrigo Paz Delgado, Quito
19:30	Guerra 15'; Martínez Borja 36'; Sornoza 76' (pen.)	Report		Referee: Andrés Rojas (Colombia)

11 March 2020 MD2	River Plate	8–0	Binacional	Estadio Monumental, Buenos Aires
19:15	Casco 38'; Borré 55'; Carrascal 58'; Fernández 74', 90+2'; Rojas 79'; Díaz 80'; Suárez 88'	Report		Referee: Jesús Valenzuela (Venezuela)

== Squad statistics ==
=== Appearances and goals ===
No.	Pos.	Nationality	Name	League		Cup		League Cup		Continental		Total		Discipline		Ref
No.	Pos.	Nationality	Name	Apps	Goals	Apps	Goals	Apps	Goals	Apps	Goals	Apps	Goals	Yellow card	Red card	Ref
1	GK	Argentina	Franco Armani	5	0	0	0	0	0	4	0	9	0	0	0	
2	RB	Paraguay	Robert Rojas	3	0	0	0	0	0	3(1)	0	6(1)	0	1	0	
4	LB	Argentina	Fabrizio Angileri	1	0	1	0	0	0	1	0	3	0	1	0	
5	CM	Argentina	Bruno Zuculini	2(1)	0	0	0	0	0	1	0	3(1)	0	3	0	
6	CB	Chile	Paulo Díaz	2	0	0	0	0	0	0	0	2	0	1	0	
7	LW	Argentina	Matías Suárez	3(1)	3	0	0	0	0	3(1)	0	6(2)	3	1	0	
8	AM	Colombia	Jorge Carrascal	2(1)	1	0	0	0	0	1(1)	0	3(2)	1	2	0	
9	CF	Argentina	Julián Álvarez	0(2)	0	1	0	0	0	1	0	2(2)	0	1	0	
10	AM	Colombia	Juan Fernando Quintero	0	0	0	0	0	0	0	0	0	0	0	0	
11	AM	Uruguay	Nicolás De La Cruz	3(1)	1	0(1)	0	0	0	3(1)	1	6(3)	2	3	0	
12	GK	Argentina	Ezequiel Centurión	0	0	0	0	0	0	0	0	0	0	0	0	
13	CM	Argentina	Santiago Sosa	0	0	0	0	0	0	0	0	0	0	0	0	
14	GK	Argentina	Germán Lux	0	0	1	0	0	0	0	0	1	0	0	0	
15	AM	Argentina	Exequiel Palacios	4(1)	0	1	1	0	0	3(1)	0	8(2)	1	1	0	
16	CB	Argentina	Kevin Sibille	0	0	0	0	0	0	0	0	0	0	0	0	
17	RB	Argentina	Elías López	2	0	0	0	0	0	0	0	2	0	1	0	
18	FW	Argentina	Benjamín Rollheiser	1	0	0(1)	0	0	0	0	0	1(1)	0	1	0	
19	CF	Colombia	Rafael Santos Borré	3(2)	3	1	0	0	0	3	1	7(2)	4	1	0	
20	RB	Argentina	Milton Casco	4	0	0	0	0	0	3	0	7	0	4	0	
21	LM	Argentina	Cristian Ferreira	1(3)	0	0(1)	0	0	0	0(2)	0	1(6)	0	0	0	
22	LB	Argentina	Javier Pinola	1	0	1	0	0	0	1	0	3	0	2	1	
23	CM	Argentina	Leonardo Ponzio	0	0	1	0	0	0	1	0	2	0	0	0	
24	RM	Argentina	Enzo Pérez	4	0	1	0	0	0	3	0	8	0	6	0	
25	GK	Argentina	Enrique Bologna	0	0	0	0	0	0	0	0	0	0	0	0	
26	AM	Argentina	Ignacio Fernández	3	1	1	0	0	0	4	1	8	2	2	0	
27	CF	Argentina	Lucas Pratto	3(1)	0	0	0	0	0	1(3)	0	4(4)	0	0	0	
28	CB	Argentina	Lucas Martínez Quarta	4	0	1	0	0	0	4	0	9	0	1	0	
29	CB	Argentina	Gonzalo Montiel	3	0	1	0	0	0	4	0	8	0	2	0	
32	RW	Argentina	Ignacio Scocco	1(2)	1	0	0	0	0	0(2)	0	1(4)	1	0	0	
33	CB	Argentina	Héctor Martínez	0	0	0	0	0	0	0	0	0	0	0	0	
34	CF	Argentina	Lucas Beltrán	0	0	0	0	0	0	0	0	0	0	0	0	
35	CF	Argentina	Federico Girotti	0	0	0	0	0	0	0	0	0	0	0	0	
36	LB	Argentina	Nahuel Gallardo	0	0	0	0	0	0	0	0	0	0	0	0	
37	CM	Argentina	Enzo Fernández	0	0	0	0	0	0	0	0	0	0	0	0	
38	FW	Argentina	Alan Marcel Picazzo	0	0	0	0	0	0	0	0	0	0	0	0	
39	MF	Argentina	Hernán López	0	0	0	0	0	0	0	0	0	0	0	0	
–	AM	Argentina	Tomás Andrade	0	0	0	0	0	0	0	0	0	0	0	0	
–	CM	Argentina	Joaquín Arzura	0	0	0	0	0	0	0	0	0	0	0	0	
–	AM	Argentina	Carlos Auzqui	0	0	0	0	0	0	0	0	0	0	0	0	
–	GK	Argentina	Augusto Batalla	0	0	0	0	0	0	0	0	0	0	0	0	
–	CF	Argentina Chile	Marcelo Larrondo	0	0	0	0	0	0	0	0	0	0	0	0	
–	CB	Argentina	Luciano Lollo	0	0	0	0	0	0	0	0	0	0	0	0	
–	CM	Argentina	Zacarías Morán	0	0	0	0	0	0	0	0	0	0	0	0	
–	RM	Argentina	Jorge Moreira	0	0	0	0	0	0	0	0	0	0	0	0	
–	AM	Argentina	Matías Moya	0	0	0	0	0	0	0	0	0	0	0	0	
–	LB	Argentina	Luis Olivera	0	0	0	0	0	0	0	0	0	0	0	0	
–	CM	Argentina	Iván Rossi	0	0	0	0	0	0	0	0	0	0	0	0	
–	CB	Argentina	Leandro Vega	0	0	0	0	0	0	0	0	0	0	0	0	
–	GK	Argentina	Maximiliano Velazco	0	0	0	0	0	0	0	0	0	0	0	0	
Own goals				—	0	—	0	—	0	—	0	—	0	—	—	—
Players who left during the season
31	RM	Argentina	Santiago Vera	0	0	0	0	0	0	0	0	0	0	0	0	

Statistics accurate as of 2 September 2019.

=== Goalscorers ===
Rank	Pos	No.	Nat	Name	League	Cup	League Cup	Continental	Total	Ref
1	CF	19	Colombia	Rafael Santos Borré	12	2	0	3	17	
2	LW	7	Argentina	Matías Suárez	7	0	0	0	7	
3	AM	26	Argentina	Ignacio Fernández	5	1	0	2	8	
3	AM	11	Uruguay	Nicolás De La Cruz	4	0	0	1	5	
4	AM	15	Argentina	Exequiel Palacios	1	2	0	0	1	
4	AM	8	Colombia	Jorge Carrascal	1	0	0	0	1	
4	RW	32	Argentina	Ignacio Scocco	1	0	0	0	1	
Own goals					0	0	0	0	0	
Totals					10	1	0	3	14	—
