= 2019 Recopa Sudamericana =

- Promotional poster of the first leg
- Event: Recopa Sudamericana
Athletico Paranaense	River Plate
(Brazil)	(Argentina)
1	3
- on aggregate

First leg
Athletico Paranaense	River Plate
1	0
- Date: 22 May 2019
- Venue: Arena da Baixada, Curitiba
- Referee: Wilmar Roldán (Colombia)
- Attendance: 30,400

Second leg
River Plate	Athletico Paranaense
3	0
- Date: 30 May 2019
- Venue: Estadio Monumental, Buenos Aires
- Referee: Roberto Tobar (Chile)
- Attendance: 66,500

The 2019 Recopa Sudamericana was a football match played over two legs between River Plate of Argentina and Athletico Paranaense of Brazil. The first leg was played at the Arena da Baixada, Curitiba on 22 May 2019 and the second leg was played on 30 May 2019 at the Estadio Monumental, Buenos Aires. The annual Recopa Sudamericana was contested between the winners of the Copa Libertadores and Copa Sudamericana. It was River Plate's fifth appearance, having won the competition back-to-back in 2015 and 2016. Athletico Paranaense were appearing for the first time.

The teams qualified for the tournament by winning the Copa Libertadores and Copa Sudamericana. Athletico Paranaense qualified by winning the 2018 Copa Sudamericana. They beat Colombian team Junior 4–3 on penalties after a 2–2 aggregate in the final. River Plate won the 2018 Copa Libertadores beating rivals Boca Juniors 5–3 in the final.

A crowd of 30,400 observed the first leg at the Arena da Baixada, in which Athletico Paranaense took the lead in the series courtesy of the lone goal scored by Marco Ruben. In the second leg at the Estadio Monumental, attended by 66,500, River Plate tied the match after Ignacio Fernández scored the rebound off of a penalty Santos had stopped him. They extended their lead in stoppage time when Lucas Pratto scored, and added one more courtesy of Matías Suárez four minutes later. River Plate secured their third Recopa Sudamericana win after completing the comeback.

== Background ==
The Recopa Sudamericana was founded in 1989 to determine the best team in South America. From 1989 to 1998, it was contested between the winners of the Copa Libertadores and the Supercopa Libertadores, until CONMEBOL discontinued the latter. The competition then entered a four-year hiatus, resuming with the introduction of another major secondary tournament, the Copa Sudamericana.

Athletico Paranaense qualified for the Recopa Sudamericana by winning the 2018 Copa Sudamericana. They beat Colombian team Junior in the final, having won 4–3 on penalties after a tied aggregate at two goals each. Athletico Paranaense won the Copa Sudamericana for the first time, and were set to make their debut in the Recopa Sudamericana.

River Plate qualified for the match as winners of the 2018 Copa Libertadores. They beat their historic rivals Boca Juniors 5–3 in the finals to win their fourth Copa Libertadores title. River Plate were appearing in the competition for the fifth time, with a record consisting of two successive wins in 2015 and 2016 and consecutive losses in 1997 and 1998.

River Plate's last game before the tournament was a 4–1 win over Atlético Tucumán in the second leg of the Copa de la Superliga quarterfinals. This result was insufficient to overturn the three-goal deficit from the first leg, and a 4–4 aggregate draw saw them eliminated on away goals. Athletico Paranaense's meeting with Corinthians on 19 May yielded them a 2–0 loss in the 2019 Campeonato Brasileiro Série A.

== First leg ==
=== Summary ===
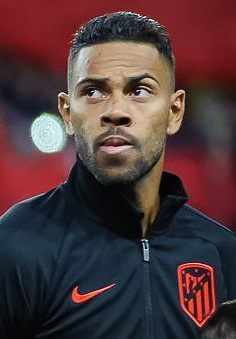
Renan Lodi's performance was crucial, as he contributed to putting his team ahead on the aggregate.

The first leg was held at the Arena da Baixada, the home ground of Athletico Paranaense. The home side attempted to open the scoring right after the first whistle, when Lucho González took a shot from just outside the box that forced goalkeeper Franco Armani into a save. Both teams displayed an aggressive approach early on. Athletico Paranaense exploited the speed of their wingers and full-backs, while River Plate applied suffocating pressure in the opposing half, positioning their lines high up the field. The gameplan for the home side yielded them numerical superiority when attacking, as they occupied spaces better than their opponents. They posed threats through runs down both sides of the pitch, and eventually managed to capitalize on one of them. In the 25th minute, Renan Lodi broke down the flank before passing to Rony. The winger got rid of his markers by turning around, and then laid the ball off for Marco Ruben to tap in, making it 1–0. Five minutes later, Lodi created another chance that was unable to be finished by Ruben and González. During the final minutes, River Plate tried to maintain their composure while in possession. The visitors slowed down the pace of the match, as they looked to cover more ground. They managed to funnel danger through set pieces, but none came into fruition, and the score remained for half-time.

River Plate came close to tying the game in the second minute of the half, after a shot from Exequiel Palacios caught a deflection. Nonetheless, Athletico Paranaense continued to cause problems with quick transitions and counter-attacks. They almost extended their lead if not for Armani, who provided a save after a shot from Lodi. The home side had further chances through a Bruno Guimarães free kick, also fended off by the goalkeeper, and two efforts from Nikão, which went over the crossbar. River Plate manager Marcelo Gallardo rearranged his squad to try to battle back in the midfield, subbing in defensive midfielder Bruno Zuculini for Palacios. This, however, proved unsuccessful. Instead, River Plate responded with a chance of their own, but a cross from the left failed to find a teammate. At the 78-minute mark, Milton Casco punched Rony before a free kick, prompting referee Wilmar Roldán to hand him a straight red card after consulting the video assistant referee (VAR). The result ended unchanged, however, and Athletico Paranaense carried the advantage into the second leg.

Gallardo was critical of his team's performance, stating: "We didn't play well overall. We couldn't find our footing on the pitch, either on the field or in terms of our football." In spite of this analysis, he was clear about their chances coming into the rematch: "We're still in the game because we only lost by a single goal, and we have everything we need to turn things around at home."

=== Details ===
22 May 2019
21:30 UTC−3

Athletico Paranaense (Brazil)	1–0	(Argentina) River Plate
Ruben 25'	Report

Arena da Baixada, Curitiba
Attendance: 30,400
Referee: Wilmar Roldán (Colombia)

Athletico Paranaense	River Plate

GK	1	(Brazil) Santos
RB	2	(Brazil) Jonathan		(substituted off) 65'
CB	13	(Brazil) Paulo André	(yellow card) 71'
CB	4	(Brazil) Léo Pereira	(yellow card) 90+4'
LB	12	(Brazil) Renan Lodi
CM	5	(Brazil) Wellington	(yellow card) 76'	(substituted off) 86'
CM	16	(Brazil) Bruno Guimarães
RW	11	(Brazil) Nikão
AM	3	(Argentina) Lucho González (c)		(substituted off) 75'
LW	7	(Brazil) Rony
CF	9	(Argentina) Marco Ruben
Substitutes:
GK	25	(Brazil) Caio
DF	6	(Brazil) Márcio Azevedo
DF	21	(Brazil) Lucas Halter
DF	23	(Brazil) Mádson		(substituted on) 65'
MF	15	(Brazil) Erick
MF	18	(Brazil) Léo Cittadini		(substituted on) 75'
MF	20	(Brazil) Matheus Rossetto
MF	22	(Brazil) Thonny Anderson		(substituted on) 86'
FW	8	(Brazil) Bruno Nazário
FW	10	(Brazil) Marcelo Cirino
FW	17	(Argentina) Braian Romero
FW	19	(Brazil) Vitinho
Manager:
(Brazil) Tiago Nunes

GK	1	(Argentina) Franco Armani
RB	18	(Uruguay) Camilo Mayada		(substituted off) 61'
CB	22	(Argentina) Javier Pinola (c)
CB	21	(Argentina) Lucas Martínez Quarta	(yellow card) 45+3'
LB	20	(Argentina) Milton Casco	(red card) 81'
CM	11	(Uruguay) Nicolás De La Cruz
CM	24	(Argentina) Enzo Pérez
CM	15	(Argentina) Exequiel Palacios		(substituted off) 71'
AM	10	(Argentina) Ignacio Fernández
CF	7	(Argentina) Matías Suárez	(yellow card) 68'	(substituted off) 75'
CF	9	(Argentina) Lucas Pratto
Substitutes:
GK	14	(Argentina) Germán Lux
GK	25	(Argentina) Enrique Bologna
DF	2	(Paraguay) Robert Rojas
DF	3	(Argentina) Nahuel Gallardo
DF	4	(Argentina) Fabrizio Angileri	(yellow card) 89'	(substituted on) 61'
DF	6	(Argentina) Luciano Lollo
DF	16	(Argentina) Kevin Sibille
MF	5	(Argentina) Bruno Zuculini		(substituted on) 71'
MF	8	(Colombia) Jorge Carrascal
MF	23	(Argentina) Leonardo Ponzio
FW	19	(Colombia) Rafael Santos Borré		(substituted on) 75'
Manager:
(Argentina) Marcelo Gallardo

Assistant referees
Alexander Guzmán (Colombia)
John Alexander León (Colombia)
Fourth official
Carlos Herrera (Colombia)
Video assistant referee
Daniel Fedorczuk (Uruguay)
Assistant video assistant referees
Nicolás Gallo (Colombia)
Nicolás Tarán (Uruguay)

Match rules

- 90 minutes
- Twelve named substitutes, of which up to three may be used

== Second leg ==
=== Summary ===
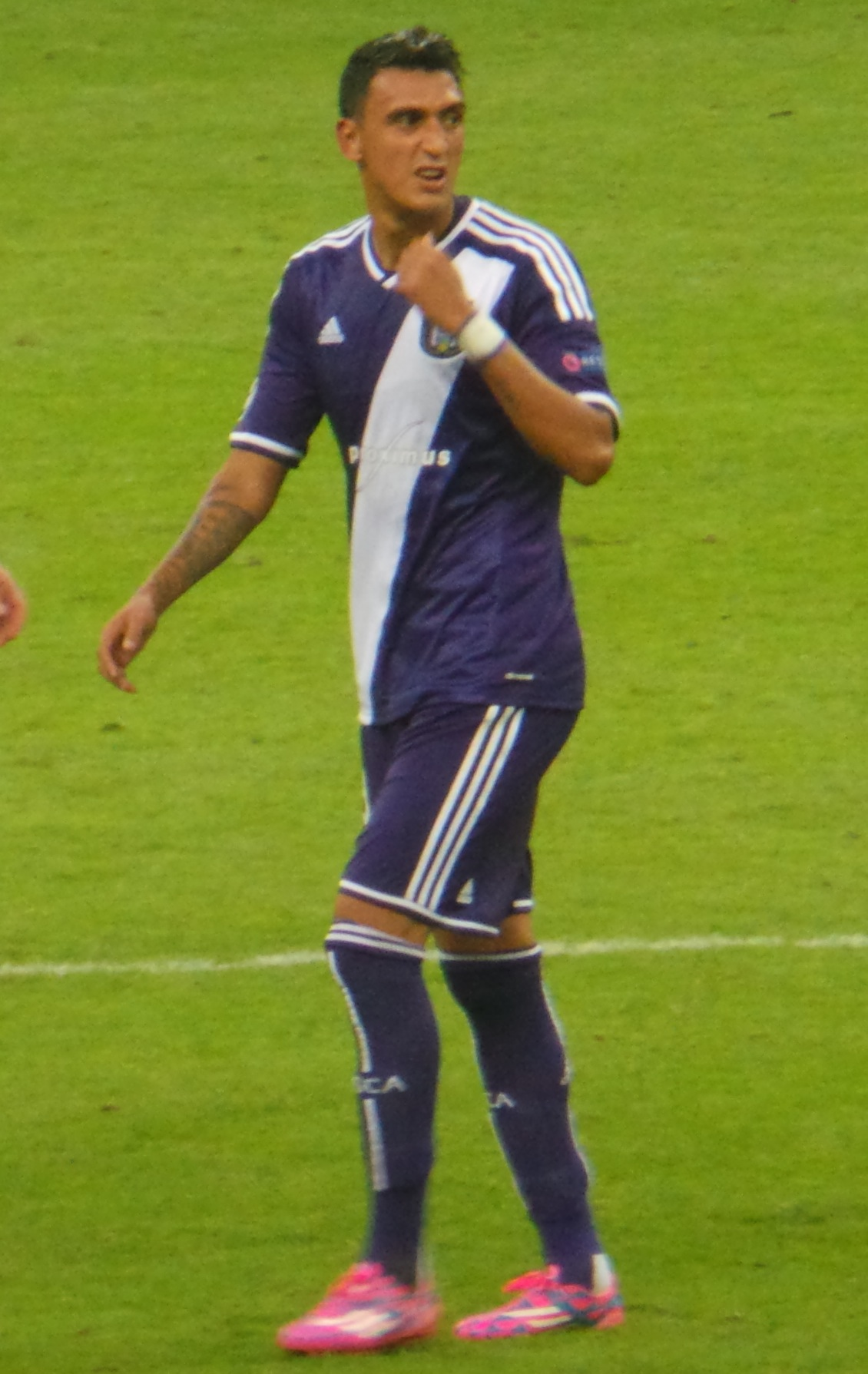
Matías Suárez's assist and goal gave River Plate their third Recopa Sudamericana win.

Athletico Paranaense's 1–0 victory in the first leg meant that River Plate needed a goal to force the tie into extra-time. At the Estadio Monumental, both teams displayed an intense and frenetic approach from the first minute. Athletico Paranaense challenged their opposition for possession in the midfield, while River Plate exerted high pressure in search for the equaliser. In the 13th minute, Ignacio Fernández unleashed a powerful right-footed shot from inside the area that struck goalkeeper Santos' left post. Four minutes later, Lucas Pratto headed the ball after a precise cross from Fabrizio Angileri, but the goalkeeper got ahold of it. The striker tested Santos once more at the 23-minute mark, being barely denied from scoring the opening goal. Despite the River Plate dominance, Athletico Paranaense were able to create trouble with sporadic counterattacks. In the 31st minute, Rony ran through the right side and managed to slip from his markers. He then passed over to González, whose point-blank shot was saved by Franco Armani as the goalkeeper deflected it for a corner. From there on out, River Plate's initiative started to fade as the opening half came to a closing.

During half-time, Gallardo subbed Nicolás de la Cruz in for Exequel Palacios, who suffered a muscle injury. The second half began with Athletico Paranaense defending the favourable result with focus and composure. Around 15 minutes after the restart, Chilean official Roberto Tobar awarded a penalty to River Plate after consultation with the VAR, as he credited a handball by González inside the box following a corner. Fernández stood up to take the spot kick, but Santos defended his shot. However, the ball hit the post right after the save, favouring the midfielder in the rebound who slammed it for the equaliser. Gallardo made another substitution when he replaced Rafael Santos Borré with fellow striker Matías Suárez. In the 75th minute, the subbed forward crossed for Fernández, who could only manage a weak touch in good position. Athletico Paranaense eventually responded through Renan Lodi, who unveiled a long-range shot at the 79-minute mark which forced Armani into a save. They had a follow up chance eight minutes later, when Léo Cittadini, upon entering the field, was unable to shoot on target after hesitating on the finish. The game seemed to be heading for extra-time, but Pratto would put River Plate ahead in the first minute of injury time. He controlled a cross from Suárez, and took a low shot on net that to beat Santos. Following the goal, Athletico Paranaense scrambled in their attempts at tying the match, which resulted in defensive gaps. Suárez took advantage of the spaces to add one further, as he dribbled the keeper just moments away from the final whistle.

=== Details ===
30 May 2019
21:30 UTC−3

River Plate (Argentina)	3–0	(Brazil) Athletico Paranaense
Fernández 65'; Pratto 90+1'; Suárez 90+5'	Report

Estadio Monumental, Buenos Aires
Attendance: 66,500
Referee: Roberto Tobar (Chile)

River Plate	Athletico Paranaense

GK	1	(Argentina) Franco Armani
RB	13	(Argentina) Gonzalo Montiel	(yellow card) 58'
CB	21	(Argentina) Lucas Martínez Quarta	(yellow card) 55'
CB	22	(Argentina) Javier Pinola
LB	4	(Argentina) Fabrizio Angileri		(substituted off) 86'
DM	23	(Argentina) Leonardo Ponzio (c)
CM	24	(Argentina) Enzo Pérez
CM	15	(Argentina) Exequiel Palacios		(substituted off) 46'
AM	10	(Argentina) Ignacio Fernández
CF	19	(Colombia) Rafael Santos Borré		(substituted off) 71'
CF	9	(Argentina) Lucas Pratto
Substitutes:
GK	14	(Argentina) Germán Lux
DF	2	(Paraguay) Robert Rojas
DF	3	(Argentina) Nahuel Gallardo
DF	6	(Argentina) Luciano Lollo
MF	5	(Argentina) Bruno Zuculini
MF	8	(Colombia) Jorge Carrascal
MF	11	(Uruguay) Nicolás De La Cruz		(substituted on) 46'
MF	18	(Uruguay) Camilo Mayada		(substituted on) 86'
FW	7	(Argentina) Matías Suárez		(substituted on) 71'
Manager:
(Argentina) Marcelo Gallardo

GK	1	(Brazil) Santos
RB	2	(Brazil) Jonathan		(substituted off) 90+3'
CB	13	(Brazil) Paulo André
CB	4	(Brazil) Léo Pereira
LB	12	(Brazil) Renan Lodi	(yellow card) 69'
RM	11	(Brazil) Nikão		(substituted off) 78'
CM	5	(Brazil) Wellington	(yellow card) 80'
CM	16	(Brazil) Bruno Guimarães	(yellow card) 66'
LM	7	(Brazil) Rony
AM	3	(Argentina) Lucho González (c)	(yellow card) 45+2'	(substituted off) 87'
CF	9	(Argentina) Marco Ruben
Substitutes:
GK	25	(Brazil) Caio
DF	6	(Brazil) Márcio Azevedo
DF	21	(Brazil) Lucas Halter
DF	23	(Brazil) Mádson
MF	15	(Brazil) Erick
MF	18	(Brazil) Léo Cittadini		(substituted on) 87'
MF	20	(Brazil) Matheus Rossetto
MF	22	(Brazil) Thonny Anderson
FW	8	(Brazil) Bruno Nazário
FW	10	(Brazil) Marcelo Cirino		(substituted on) 78'
FW	17	(Argentina) Braian Romero		(substituted on) 90+3'
FW	19	(Brazil) Vitinho
Manager:
(Brazil) Tiago Nunes

Assistant referees
Christian Scheimann (Chile)
Claudio Ríos (Chile)
Fourth official
Eduardo Gamboa (Chile)
Video assistant referee
Diego Haro (Peru)
Assistant video assistant referees
Víctor Carrillo (Peru)
Jonny Bossio (Peru)

Match rules

- 90 minutes
- 30 minutes of extra time if necessary
- Penalty shoot-out if scores still level
- Twelve named substitutes
- Maximum of three substitutions, with a fourth allowed in extra time

== Post-match ==
River Plate manager Marcelo Gallardo praised his team after the second leg: "These players have a special gift for these kinds of matches, a winning mentality, a connection with their fans, with their people." He also made a remark on how the arrival of Lucas Pratto made an impact on his squad: "Tonight only confirms that we weren't wrong to bring Pratto in [...] Although he was valued based on his price tag, he more than justified what was paid for him."

Athletico Paranaense's Tiago Nunes also complemented his squad following the loss: "I'm happy in the sense that the group fought. Even with a feeling of defeat, we have to be proud of what we built." He reflected on the match and towards River Plate, stating: "We played two great games against a superb team. It serves as a learning experience for a club that is becoming more prominent, like Athletico [Paranaense]."

River Plate qualified for the 2020 Copa Libertadores as champions of their domestic cup, the 2018–19 Copa Argentina. They had also finished in fourth place of the 2018–19 Superliga Argentina. Athletico Paranaense followed a similar suit, as they managed a fifth place in the 2019 Campeonato Brasileiro Série A, but won the 2019 Copa do Brasil, thereby securing a spot for the following season's Copa Libertadores.

== See also ==
- 2019 Copa Libertadores
- 2019 Copa Sudamericana
- 2018-19 Club Atlético River Plate season
