= Milton Casco =

Argentine footballer (born 1988)

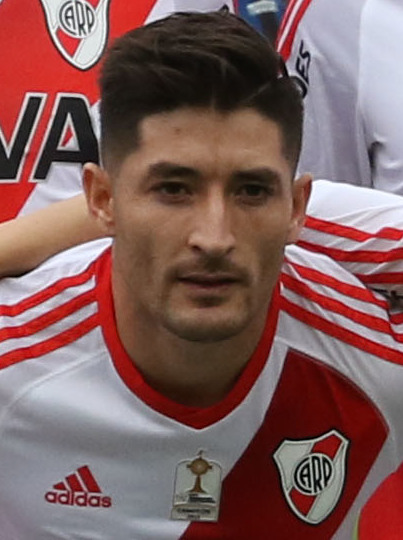
- Casco with River Plate in 2016

Personal information
- Full name: Milton Óscar Casco
- Date of birth: 11 April 1988 (age 38)
- Place of birth: María Grande, Entre Ríos, Argentina
- Height: 1.70 m (5 ft 7 in)
- Position: Left-back

Team information
- Current team: Atlético Nacional
- Number: 20

Youth career
- Atlético María Grande
- Gimnasia LP

Senior career*
Years	Team	Apps	(Gls)
2009–2012	Gimnasia LP	73	(0)
2012–2015	Newell's Old Boys	82	(5)
2015–2025	River Plate	210	(3)
2026–	Atlético Nacional	0	(0)

International career^{‡}
2015–2019	Argentina	3	(0)
Medal record
Men's football
Representing Argentina
Copa América
Third place	2019 Brazil
- * Club domestic league appearances and goals as of 17:29, 9 December 2025 (UTC) ‡ National team caps and goals as of 19 June 2019

Milton Óscar Casco (born 11 April 1988) is an Argentine professional footballer who plays as left-back for Categoría Primera A club Atlético Nacional.

== Club career ==
Born in María Grande, Entre Ríos Province, Casco began his professional career with Gimnasia y Esgrima La Plata of the Argentine Primera División in 2009. In July 2012 he signed for Newell's Old Boys under manager Gerardo Martino, who bought 50% of his economic rights.

In August 2015, Casco was close to a €2.5 million move to French club Olympique de Marseille. The transfer fell through when compatriot Marcelo Bielsa unexpectedly resigned as the Ligue 1 team's manager.

On 9 September 2015, Casco signed a three-year contract with CA River Plate, with the Buenos Aires–based club purchasing 85% of his economic rights for $3 million. He made his debut four days later in the Superclásico against arch-rivals Boca Juniors, a 1–0 home loss. On 18 July 2017 he signed an extension until June 2020. On 12 February 2021 he signed an extension until December 2023. On 13 September 2022, he extended his contract until December 2025.

On 6 January 2026, Casco signed with Atlético Nacional.

== International career ==
On 27 May, uncapped Casco was selected by coach Gerardo Martino for the 2015 Copa América in Chile. He made his debut in a preparation friendly on 7 June at the Estadio San Juan del Bicentenario, filling in for Facundo Roncaglia for the final 29 minutes of a 5–0 win over Bolivia; however, he did not feature in the tournament, in which his country lost to the hosts in the final.

Absent from the national team since the 2015 tournament, Casco was a surprise inclusion for the 2019 Copa América in Brazil, with Lionel Scaloni picking him ahead of Gabriel Mercado. He played one game of a third-place finish, the 1–1 group draw with Paraguay at the Mineirão.

== Club statistics ==
=== Club ===
As of match played 22 June 2023

Appearances and goals by club, season and competition
Club	Season	League			National Cup		Continental (Note: Includes the Copa Libertadores and Copa Sudamericana.)		Other (Note: Includes the FIFA Club World Cup, Recopa Sudamericana, Copa de la Superliga and Supercopa Argentina.)		Total	
Club	Season	Division	Apps	Goals	Apps	Goals	Apps	Goals	Apps	Goals	Apps	Goals
Gimnasia La Plata	2008–09	Argentine Primera División	2	0	0	0	0	0	0	0	2	0
Gimnasia La Plata	2009–10	Argentine Primera División	14	0	0	0	0	0	0	0	14	0
Gimnasia La Plata	2010–11	Argentine Primera División	26	0	0	0	0	0	0	0	26	0
Gimnasia La Plata	2011–12	Primera B	31	0	0	0	—		0	0	31	0
Gimnasia La Plata	Total		73	0	0	0	0	0	0	0	73	0
Newell's	2012–13	Argentine Primera División	21	2	1	0	10	2	0	0	32	3
Newell's	2013–14	Argentine Primera División	33	3	0	0	2	0	0	0	35	3
Newell's	2014	Argentine Primera División	11	0	1	0	6	1	0	0	18	1
Newell's	2015	Argentine Primera División	17	0	1	0	0	0	0	0	18	0
Newell's	Total		82	5	3	0	18	3	0	0	103	7
River Plate	2015	Argentine Primera División	5	0	0	0	6	0	0	0	11	0
River Plate	2016	Argentine Primera División	9	1	0	0	6	0	0	0	15	1
River Plate	2016–17	Argentine Primera División	20	0	4	0	3	0	3	0	30	0
River Plate	2017–18	Argentine Primera División	12	1	3	0	6	0	0	0	21	1
River Plate	2018–19	Argentine Primera División	13	0	5	0	8	0	5	0	31	0
River Plate	2019–20	Argentine Primera División	19	1	4	0	7	1	0	0	30	2
River Plate	2020–21	Argentine Primera División	7	0	0	0	7	0	0	0	7	0
River Plate	2021	Argentine Primera División	26	0	0	0	9	0	0	0	35	0
River Plate	2022	Argentine Primera División	30	0	3	1	8	0	0	0	41	1
River Plate	2023	Argentine Primera División	18	0	0	0	4	0	0	0	22	0
River Plate	Total		159	3	19	1	64	1	8	0	243	5
Career total			314	8	22	1	82	4	8	0	419	12

== Honours ==
Newell's Old Boys

- Argentine Primera División: 2013 Final

River Plate

- Recopa Sudamericana: 2016, 2019
- Copa Argentina: 2015–2016, 2016–2017, 2019
- Supercopa Argentina: 2017, 2019, 2023
- Copa Libertadores: 2018; runner-up: 2019
- Argentine Primera División: 2021, 2023
- Trofeo de Campeones: 2021, 2023
- Supercopa Internacional runner-up: 2023
- FIFA Club World Cup runner-up: 2015

Argentina

- Copa América: runner-up 2015, third place 2019
