= Matías Suárez =

Argentine footballer (born 1988)

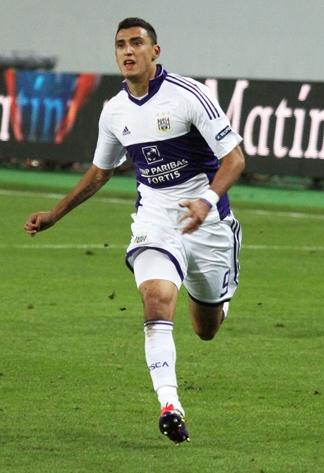
- Suárez playing for Anderlecht in 2011

Personal information
- Full name: Matías Ezequiel Suárez
- Date of birth: 9 May 1988 (age 38)
- Place of birth: La Falda, Córdoba, Argentina
- Height: 1.82 m (6 ft 0 in)
- Position: Forward

Youth career
- Unión San Vicente
- 2002–2005: Belgrano

Senior career*
Years	Team	Apps	(Gls)
2005–2008	Belgrano	55	(13)
2008–2016	Anderlecht	173	(50)
2016–2019	Belgrano	57	(10)
2019–2024	River Plate	79	(33)
2024	Belgrano	23	(2)
2025	Unión Española	8	(1)
2025	Güemes	–	(–)
Total		395	(109)

International career
2019	Argentina	6	(0)
Medal record
Men's football
Representing Argentina
Copa América
Third place	2019 Brazil
- * Club domestic league appearances and goals

Matías Ezequiel Suárez (Spanish pronunciation: [maˈti.as ˈswaɾes]; born 9 May 1988) is an Argentine former professional footballer who played as a forward.

== Club career ==
=== Belgrano ===
Suárez started his professional career at Club Atlético Belgrano in 2006. He was Club Atlético Belgrano's top scorer in the Primera B Nacional of Argentina in 2007–08. Due to his performances he attracted the attention of Arsenal.

=== Anderlecht ===
In 2008 Suárez moved from Belgrano and completed his transfer to Anderlecht. He went on to establish himself as a key member of the Anderlecht side contributing many goals and assists in the process, especially following the departure of the team's star player Romelu Lukaku to Chelsea in the summer of 2011.

The 2011–12 season was his best so far, on a personal level and with the team. While Anderlecht were crowned Belgian champions, Suárez was crowned Player of the Year 2011 and elected Player of the Season 2011–12 by his professional colleagues in Belgium. After a highly successful season, Suarez was officially signed by CSKA Moscow. The fee was undisclosed and later cancelled as Suárez failed the medical tests and returned to Anderlecht afterwards.

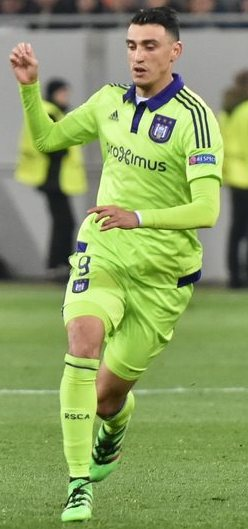
Suárez with Anderlecht in 2016

=== Return to Belgrano ===
After the 2016 terrorist attacks on Brussels, Suárez announced his intention to leave Anderlecht at the end of the season, despite Anderlecht and Belgrano not agreeing on a transfer fee. As a consequence, he terminated his contract unilaterally, allegedly fearing for his family's safety. In December 2017, FIFA delivered a decision in favor of Anderlecht, ruling out any alleged threat on Suárez family and ordered Suárez and his club to pay Anderlecht compensation. The club filed a complaint to FIFA Dispute Resolution Chamber, which ordered the player to pay €540,350 to the club. Both the player and the club filed an appeal to the Court of Arbitration for Sport. The court ordered the player and Belgrano jointly liable to pay Anderlecht €1,212,225.23.

=== River Plate ===
On 26 January 2019, River Plate paid Belgrano $2.8 million for the player's rights. Suárez signed a three-and-a-half-year contract with his new team. He scored his first goal on his debut on 30 January 2019, against Godoy Cruz.

=== Return to Belgrano II ===
In January 2024, he returned to Belgrano for a third spell on a one-year contract.

=== Unión Española ===
In January 2025, Suárez moved to Chile and signed with Unión Española. He ended his contract on 11 July of the same year.

=== Retirement ===
In 2025, Suárez received an offer to play for Racing de Córdoba. However, he announced his official retirement in January 2026.

== International career ==
Suárez made his debut for Argentina national team on 22 March 2019 in a friendly against Venezuela, as a half-time substitute for Pity Martínez.

== Personal life ==
He is the uncle of fellow footballers Federico Álvarez and Gastón Álvarez Suárez. He is married to singer Magalí Olave and has two children.

== Career statistics ==
As of 19 April 2023

Appearances and goals by club, season and competition
Club	Season	League			National cup (Note: Includes Belgian Cup, Copa Argentina)		League cup (Note: Includes Copa de la Superliga)		Continental		Other (Note: Includes Belgian Super Cup, Supercopa Argentina)		Total	
Club	Season	Division	Apps	Goals	Apps	Goals	Apps	Goals	Apps	Goals	Apps	Goals	Apps	Goals
Anderlecht	2008–09	Belgian First Division	11	1	0	0	–		2	0	1	1	15	2
Anderlecht	2009–10	Belgian Pro League	35	11	3	0	–		13 (Note: Appearances in UEFA Champions League and UEFA Europa League)	4	0	0	51	15
Anderlecht	2010–11	Belgian Pro League	34	8	1	0	–		12	2	1	0	47	10
Anderlecht	2011–12	Belgian Pro League	35	12	0	0	–		10 (Note: Appearance(s) in UEFA Europa League)	7	0	0	45	20
Anderlecht	2012–13	Belgian Pro League	11	3	0	0	–		0	0	0	0	11	3
Anderlecht	2013–14	Belgian Pro League	11	6	1	1	–		3 (Note: Appearances in UEFA Champions League)	0	1	0	15	7
Anderlecht	2014–15	Belgian Pro League	13	4	1	0	–		3	0	1	0	16	4
Anderlecht	2015–16	Belgian Pro League	23	5	2	1	–		7	0	0	0	32	6
Anderlecht	Total		173	50	7	2	–		50	13	4	1	232	67
Belgrano	2016–17	Argentine Primera División	20	3	4	0	0	0	4 (Note: Appearances in Copa Sudamericana)	0	0	0	28	3
Belgrano	2017–18	Argentine Primera División	24	5	1	0	0	0	0	0	0	0	25	5
Belgrano	2018–19	Argentine Primera División	13	2	1	0	0	0	0	0	0	0	14	2
Belgrano	Total		57	10	6	0	0	0	4	0	0	0	67	10
River Plate	2018–19	Argentine Primera División	9	3	1	2	2	1	2 (Note: Appearances in Recopa Sudamericana)	1	0	0	14	7
River Plate	2019–20	Argentine Primera División	21	7	1	0	0	0	12 (Note: Appearances in Copa Libertadores)	1	1	1	35	9
River Plate	2020–21	Argentine Primera División	8	2	1	0	0	0	11	2	0	0	20	4
River Plate	2021	Argentine Primera División	17	7	0	0	0	0	6	1	0	0	23	8
River Plate	2022	Argentine Primera División	20	7	2	0	0	0	4	2	0	0	26	9
River Plate	2023	Argentine Primera División	4	7	0	0	0	0	0	0	0	0	4	7
River Plate	Total		79	33	5	2	2	1	35	7	1	1	122	44
Career total			309	97	18	4	2	1	89	20	5	2	421	121

== Honours ==
Anderlecht

- Belgian Pro League: 2009–10, 2011–12, 2012–13, 2013–14
- Belgian Super Cup: 2010, 2012, 2013, 2014

River Plate

- Recopa Sudamericana: 2019
- Argentine Primera División: 2021, 2023
- Copa Argentina: 2019
- Supercopa Argentina: 2019

Individual

- Footballer of the Year in Jupiler League: 2011–12
- Belgian Golden Shoe: 2011
