= Nicolás de la Cruz =

Uruguayan footballer (born 1997)

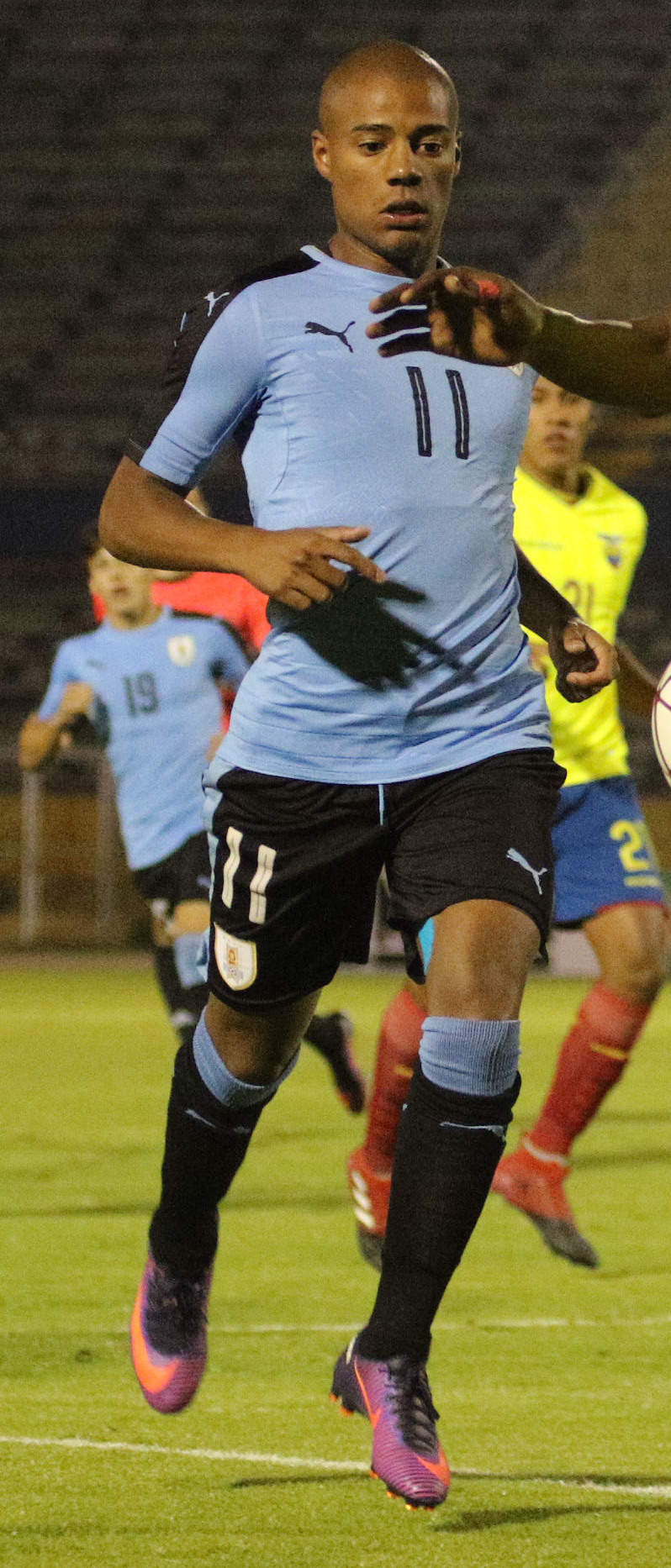
- De la Cruz playing for Uruguay U20 in 2017

Personal information
- Full name: Diego Nicolás de la Cruz Arcosa
- Date of birth: 1 June 1997 (age 29)
- Place of birth: Montevideo, Uruguay
- Height: 1.67 m (5 ft 6 in)
- Position: Central midfielder

Team information
- Current team: Flamengo
- Number: 18

Youth career
- 2009–2015: Liverpool Montevideo

Senior career*
Years	Team	Apps	(Gls)
2015–2017	Liverpool Montevideo	35	(8)
2017–2023	River Plate	137	(23)
2024–	Flamengo	66	(3)

International career^{‡}
2012	Uruguay U17	4	(1)
2015	Uruguay U18	6	(0)
2015–2017	Uruguay U20	26	(5)
2020–	Uruguay	38	(6)
Medal record
Men's football
Representing Uruguay
Copa América
Third place	2024 United States
South American U-20 Championship
Winner	2017 Ecuador
- * Club domestic league appearances and goals as of 18 October 2026 ‡ National team caps and goals as of 18 November 2026

Diego Nicolás de la Cruz Arcosa (born 1 June 1997) is a Uruguayan professional footballer who plays as a central midfielder for Campeonato Brasileiro Serie A club Flamengo and the Uruguay national team.

== Club career ==
=== River Plate ===
On 15 August 2017, de la Cruz joined Argentinian club River Plate, signing a four-year contract.

=== Flamengo ===
On 24 December 2023, it was announced that de la Cruz would join Brazilian club Flamengo at the start of the 2024 season, signing a four-year contract.

== International career ==
De la Cruz began his international career for Uruguay with under-17 team. He was captain of Uruguay under-20 team which won the 2017 South American U-20 Championship and reached the semi-finals of the 2017 FIFA U-20 World Cup.

On 18 September 2020, de la Cruz was included in Uruguay's 26-man preliminary squad for World Cup qualifying matches against Chile and Ecuador. He was later included in the final squad and made his senior debut on 8 October 2020 in Uruguay's 2–1 win against Chile. He started the match and played 55 minutes before getting replaced by Nahitan Nández.

On 31 May 2026, de la Cruz was named in Uruguay's 26-man squad for the 2026 FIFA World Cup.

== Personal life ==
De la Cruz is the half-brother of former Uruguayan international footballer Carlos Sánchez. Their nephew Facundo Trinidad is also a professional footballer. All three of them are youth academy graduates of Liverpool Montevideo.

== Career statistics ==
=== Club ===
As of match played 18 October 2026

Appearances and goals by club, season and competition
Club	Season	League			National cup		Continental		Other		Total	
Club	Season	Division	Apps	Goals	Apps	Goals	Apps	Goals	Apps	Goals	Apps	Goals
Liverpool	2015–16	Uruguayan Primera División	17	1	—		—		—		17	1
Liverpool	2016-17	Uruguayan Primera División	18	7	—		1 (Note: Appearances in Copa Sudamericana)	0	—		19	7
Liverpool	Total		35	8	—		1	0	—		36	8
River Plate	2017–18	Argentine Primera División	14	0	4	0	2 (Note: Appearances in Copa Libertadores)	0	0	0	20	0
River Plate	2018–19	Argentine Primera División	17	1	3	0	2	0	8 (Note: Appearances in FIFA Club World Cup and Recopa Sudamericana)	3	30	4
River Plate	2019–20	Argentine Primera División	17	4	5	0	12	3	1 (Note: Appearances in Supercopa Argentina)	1	35	8
River Plate	2021	Argentine Primera División	22	5	1	0	7	0	0	0	30	5
River Plate	2022	Argentine Primera División	32	4	3	0	7	2	—		42	6
River Plate	2023	Argentine Primera División	28	6	2	0	7	1	1	0	38	7
River Plate	Total		137	23	19	0	49	9	10	4	214	36
Flamengo	2024	Série A	15	2	6	0	9	0	11 (Note: Appearances in Campeonato Carioca)	0	41	2
Flamengo	2025	Série A	19	0	0	0	5	1	10 (Note: Five appearances in Campeonato Carioca, one appearance in Supercopa do Brasil, one appearance in FIFA Club World Cup, three appearances in FIFA Intercontinental Cup)	0	34	1
Flamengo	2026	Série A	14	0	1	0	4	0	4 (Note: One Appearance in Supercopa do Brasil, one appearance in Recopa Sudamericana, two appearances and one goal in Campeonato Carioca)	1	23	1
Flamengo	Total		48	2	7	0	18	1	25	1	98	4
Career total			220	33	26	0	68	10	35	5	348	48

=== International ===
As of match played 17 November 2026

Appearances and goals by national team and year
National team	Year	Apps	Goals
Uruguay	2020	4	0
Uruguay	2021	8	0
Uruguay	2022	7	2
Uruguay	2023	6	3
Uruguay	2024	7	0
Uruguay	2025	1	0
Uruguay	2026	5	1
Total		38	6

Scores and results list Uruguay's goal tally first, score column indicates score after each de la Cruz goal.

List of international goals scored by Nicolás de la Cruz
No.	Date	Venue	Opponent	Score	Result	Competition
1	11 June 2022	Estadio Centenario, Montevideo, Uruguay	Panama	3–0	5–0	Friendly
2	27 September 2022	Tehelné pole, Bratislava, Slovakia	Canada	1–0	2–0	Friendly
3	8 September 2023	Estadio Centenario, Montevideo, Uruguay	Chile	1–0	3–1	2026 FIFA World Cup qualification
4	8 September 2023	Estadio Centenario, Montevideo, Uruguay	Chile	3–1	3–1	2026 FIFA World Cup qualification
5	17 October 2023	Estadio Centenario, Montevideo, Uruguay	Brazil	2–0	2–0	2026 FIFA World Cup qualification
6	17 November 2026	Estadio Domingo Burgueño, Maldonado, Uruguay	Dominican Republic	3–0	5–0	Friendly

== Honours ==
Liverpool Montevideo

- Segunda División: 2014–15

River Plate

- Copa Argentina: 2017, 2019
- Supercopa Argentina: 2017, 2019
- Copa Libertadores: 2018
- Recopa Sudamericana: 2019
- Argentine Primera División: 2021, 2023
- Trofeo de Campeones: 2021, 2023

Flamengo

- FIFA Challenger Cup: 2025
- FIFA Derby of the Americas: 2025
- Copa Libertadores: 2025
- Campeonato Brasileiro Série A: 2025
- Copa do Brasil: 2024
- Supercopa do Brasil: 2025
- Campeonato Carioca: 2024, 2025, 2026
- FIFA Intercontinental Cup runner-up: 2025

Uruguay U20

- South American U-20 Championship: 2017

Uruguay

- Copa América third place: 2024

Individual

- South American Team of the Year: 2023
- Campeonato Carioca Team of the Season: 2024
