= Elías López =

Argentine footballer

Personal information
- Full name: Elías Sebastián López
- Date of birth: 8 July 2000 (age 26)
- Place of birth: Villa Mercedes, Argentina
- Height: 1.78 m (5 ft 10 in)
- Position: Right-back

Team information
- Current team: Aldosivi
- Number: 14

Youth career
- Argentinos Juniors
- Racing Villa Mercedes
- 2010–2019: River Plate

Senior career*
Years	Team	Apps	(Gls)
2019–2024	River Plate	3	(0)
2021–2022	→ Godoy Cruz (loan)	44	(1)
2023	→ Arsenal Sarandí (loan)	3	(0)
2024–2026	Sarmiento	33	(2)
2025	→ Belgrano (loan)	10	(0)
2026	San Martín Tucumán	6	(0)
2026–	Aldosivi	10	(0)

International career
2017	Argentina U17	2	(0)
- * Club domestic league appearances and goals as of 17:45, 6 November 2026 (UTC)

Elías Sebastián López (born 8 July 2000) is an Argentine professional footballer who plays as a right-back for Aldosivi.

== Club career ==
López initially had short stints with the youth ranks of Argentinos Juniors and Racing Villa Mercedes, prior to joining River Plate's academy in 2010. He, nine years later, was promoted into their senior set-up at the beginning of 2019–20, making his professional debut in a 1–1 draw at the Estadio Diego Armando Maradona against Argentinos Juniors; picking up a yellow card as he played the full duration against his ex-club.

On 16 February 2021, López joined fellow league club Godoy Cruz on a one-year loan with an option to purchase 50% of his pass. In January 2022, the deal was extended for one further year.

== International career ==
In 2017, López was called up by the Argentina U17s for the South American Championship in Chile. He appeared twice, in matches against Peru and Brazil. He had previously received a call-up for the U15s but didn't feature due to injury. In March 2019, López trained with the U20s.

== Career statistics ==
As of 28 July 2019.

Appearances and goals by club, season and competition
Club	Season	League			Cup		League Cup		Continental		Other		Total	
Club	Season	Division	Apps	Goals	Apps	Goals	Apps	Goals	Apps	Goals	Apps	Goals	Apps	Goals
River Plate	2019–20	Primera División	1	0	0	0	0	0	0	0	0	0	1	0
Career total			1	0	0	0	0	0	0	0	0	0	1	0
