= Santiago Vera =

Argentine footballer

Personal information
- Full name: Santiago Ezequiel Vera
- Date of birth: 12 December 1998 (age 27)
- Place of birth: San Alberto, Argentina
- Height: 1.70 m (5 ft 7 in)
- Position: Winger

Team information
- Current team: Almirante Brown

Youth career
- Almirante Brown
- 2015–2017: River Plate

Senior career*
Years	Team	Apps	(Gls)
2017–2019	River Plate	2	(0)
2019–2024	Olimpia	31	(1)
2020	→ San Lorenzo (loan)	12	(1)
2021	→ Almirante Brown (loan)	34	(10)
2023	→ Tigre (loan)	0	(0)
2023	→ Almirante Brown (loan)	17	(3)
2024–	Almirante Brown	38	(5)
2025	→ Deportivo Riestra (loan)	4	(0)
- * Club domestic league appearances and goals as of 17:42, 22 April 2026 (UTC)

Santiago Ezequiel Vera (born 12 December 1998) is an Argentine professional footballer who plays as a winger for Almirante Brown.

== Club career ==
Vera's career began in the ranks of Almirante Brown, who sold him to River Plate in 2015. Marcelo Gallardo promoted Vera to the club's senior squad for an Argentine Primera División match with San Martín on 17 September 2017, with the midfielder subsequently making his professional debut after being substituted on for Carlos Auzqui with eighteen minutes remaining. Following a further appearance versus Tigre in 2018–19, Vera terminated his contract in August 2019 in order to join Olimpia of the Paraguayan Primera División. He made five appearances off the bench, tallying ninety-nine minutes, in the 2019 campaign.

In January 2020, Vera was loaned to fellow Paraguayan Primera División team San Lorenzo. His first appearance arrived in February versus Nacional, which preceded the right midfielder scoring his first senior goal on 8 March against newly promoted Guaireña.

== International career ==
In September 2018, Vera was selected to train with the Argentina U17s.

== Career statistics ==
As of 30 January 2021.

Club statistics
Club	Season	League			Cup		League Cup		Continental		Other		Total	
Club	Season	Division	Apps	Goals	Apps	Goals	Apps	Goals	Apps	Goals	Apps	Goals	Apps	Goals
River Plate	2017–18	Argentine Primera División	1	0	0	0	—		0	0	0	0	1	0
River Plate	2018–19	Argentine Primera División	1	0	0	0	0	0	0	0	0	0	1	0
River Plate	2019–20	Argentine Primera División	0	0	0	0	0	0	0	0	0	0	0	0
River Plate	Total		2	0	0	0	0	0	0	0	0	0	2	0
Olimpia	2019	Paraguayan Primera División	5	0	0	0	—		0	0	0	0	5	0
Olimpia	2020	Paraguayan Primera División	0	0	0	0	—		0	0	0	0	0	0
Olimpia	Total		5	0	0	0	—		0	0	0	0	5	0
San Lorenzo (loan)	2020	Paraguayan Primera División	12	1	0	0	—		—		0	0	12	1
Career total			19	1	0	0	0	0	0	0	0	0	19	1

== Honours ==
Olimpia

- Paraguayan Primera División: 2019 Clausura
