= Franco Armani =

Argentine footballer (born 1986)

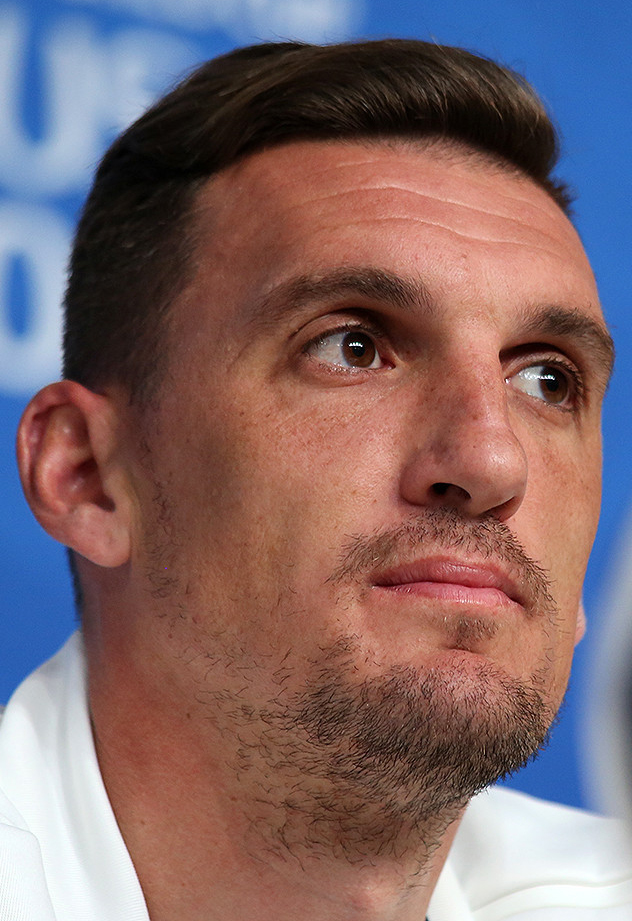
- Armani during a press conference with Argentina at the 2018 FIFA World Cup

Personal information
- Full name: Franco Armani
- Date of birth: 16 October 1986 (age 40)
- Place of birth: Casilda, Santa Fe, Argentina
- Height: 1.89 m (6 ft 2 in)
- Position: Goalkeeper

Team information
- Current team: Atlético Nacional
- Number: 34

Senior career*
Years	Team	Apps	(Gls)
2006–2008	Ferro Carril Oeste	2	(0)
2008–2010	Deportivo Merlo	37	(0)
2010–2018	Atlético Nacional	135	(0)
2018–2026	River Plate	239	(0)
2026–	Atlético Nacional	16	(0)

International career
2018–2024	Argentina	19	(0)
Medal record
Men's football
Representing Argentina
FIFA World Cup
Winner	2022 Qatar
Copa América
Winner	2021 Brazil
Winner	2024 United States
Third place	2019 Brazil
CONMEBOL–UEFA Cup of Champions
Winner	2022 England
- * Club domestic league appearances and goals as of 22:24, 7 November 2026 (UTC)

Franco Armani (Spanish pronunciation: [ˈfɾaŋko aɾˈmani]; born 16 October 1986) is an Argentine professional footballer who plays as a goalkeeper for Liga DIMAYOR club Atlético Nacional.

== Club career ==
=== Early career and Atletico Nacional ===
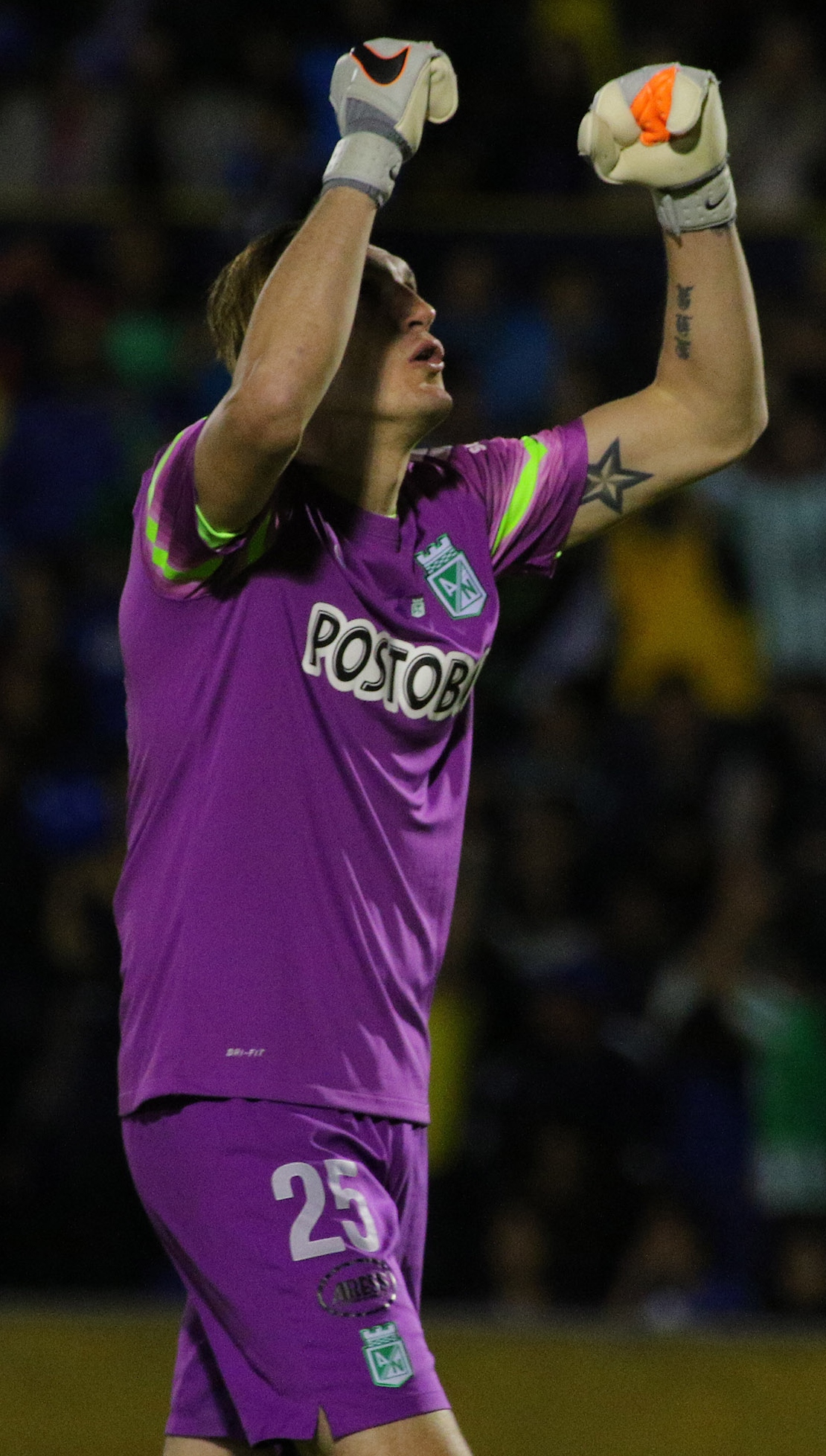
Armani with Atlético Nacional in 2016

Armani left Deportivo Merlo in 2010 for Medellin's Atlético Nacional. He stayed for 8 seasons and became their first choice goalkeeper. He was described as a hero to the Nacional fans, particularly being praised as an effective and reliable shot-stopper. Armani would go on to win thirteen trophies, including the Copa Libertadores – South America's Champions League – against Independiente del Valle in 2016.

=== River Plate ===
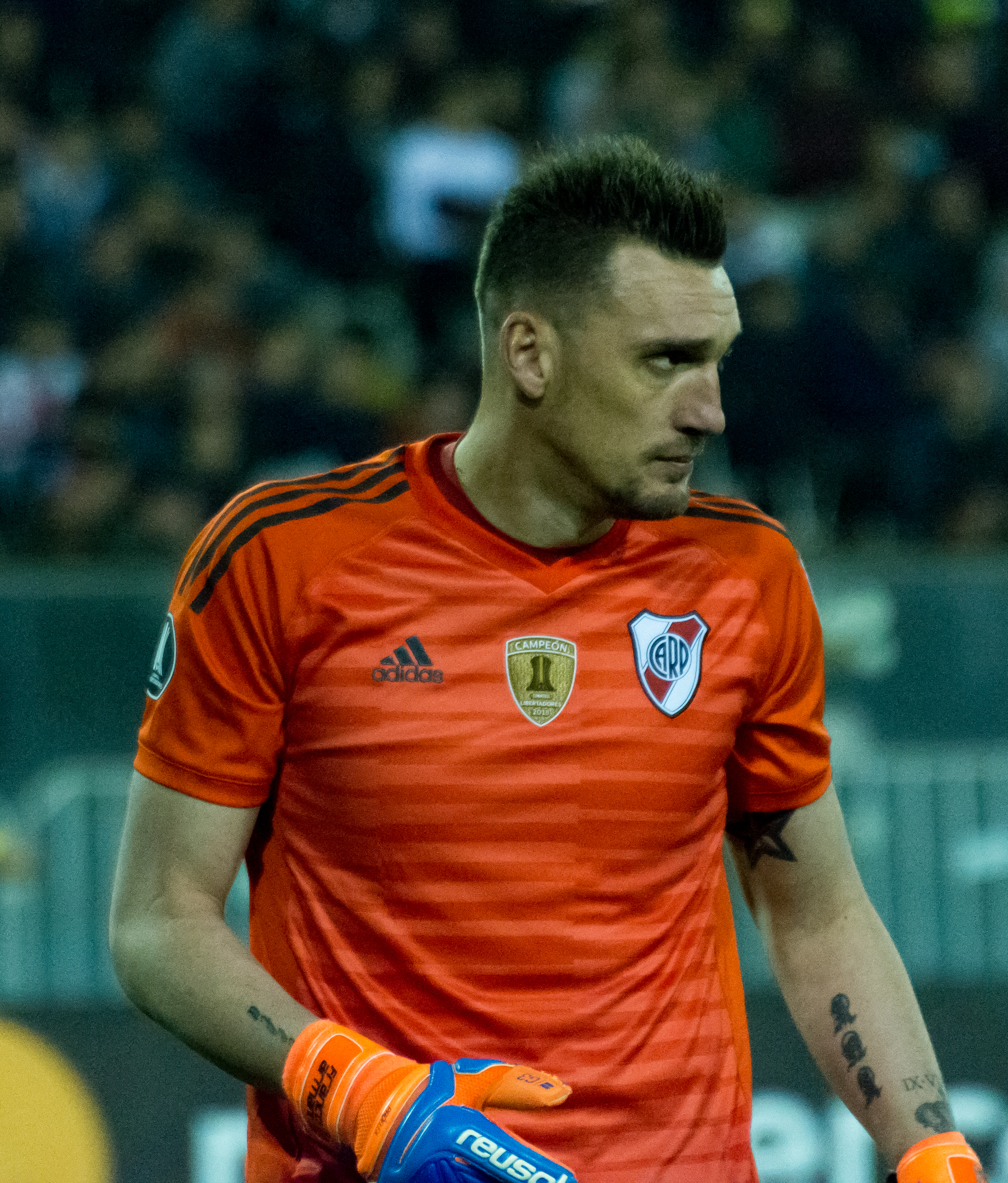
Armani with River Plate in 2019

In January 2018, River Plate paid Armani's buyout clause to Nacional, a reported $3 million. On 11 January 2018, he signed a three-year contract with Los Millonarios, which was renewed for an additional year in May 2018. On 14 March 2018, he was named man of the match in River's 2–0 triumph over arch rivals Boca Juniors for the 2017 Supercopa Argentina.

== International career ==
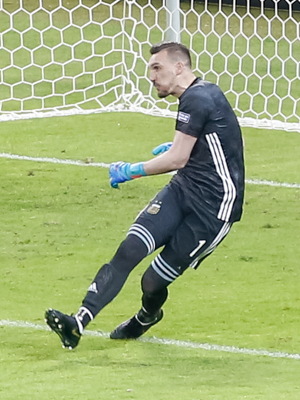
Armani playing for Argentina in 2019

Armani married a Colombian and applied for citizenship. Colombia were reportedly interested in naturalising Armani so that he could play for their national team; however, he wished to return to Argentina to press his case for a World Cup berth with the nation of his birth.

Armani has impressed for River, being described by Olé as "a goalkeeper who wins matches".

In June 2018, Armani was named in Argentina's 23-man squad for the 2018 FIFA World Cup in Russia by manager Jorge Sampaoli. On 26 June, he made his international debut starting in place of Willy Caballero for Argentina's final group match against Nigeria; Argentina advanced to the second round as group runners-up following a 2–1 victory. On 30 June, Armani started in the Round of 16 match against France, which saw Argentina eliminated from the tournament following a 4–3 defeat.

He was named in Argentina's final 23-man squad for the 2019 Copa América by manager Lionel Scaloni. He played every minute of the tournament as Argentina claimed the bronze medal by finishing third after defeating Chile 2–1 in the third place play-off match.

He was named in Argentina's 28-man squad for the 2021 Copa América. He made his only appearance in Argentina's final group match, where they defeated Bolivia 4–1 to progress to the next round. He remained understudy to Emiliano Martínez in the remaining matches as Argentina won the tournament by defeating Brazil 1–0 in the final. On 1 June 2022, Armani remained as an unused substitute as Argentina won 3–0 against reigning European Champions Italy at Wembley Stadium in the 2022 Finalissima.

He was named in Argentina's final 26-man squad for the 2022 FIFA World Cup in Qatar by Scaloni. He did not play a single minute in the tournament, with Martínez as first-choice, as Argentina won the World Cup by defeating France 4–2 in a penalty shoot-out to win the final.

In June 2024, Armani was included in Lionel Scaloni's final 26-man Argentina squad for the 2024 Copa América. Again, he didn't play a single minute, since Emiliano Martínez was Argentina's first-choice keeper. Before the tournament he announced he would retire from the national team after the tournament.

== Career statistics ==
=== Club ===
As of match played 10 November 2026

Appearances and goals by club, season and competition
Club	Season	League			Cup		Continental^{1}		Other^{2}		Total	
Club	Season	Division	Apps	Goals	Apps	Goals	Apps	Goals	Apps	Goals	Apps	Goals
Ferro Carril Oeste	2006–07	Primera B Nacional	1	0	—		—		—		1	0
Ferro Carril Oeste	2007–08	Primera B Nacional	1	0	—		—		—		1	0
Ferro Carril Oeste	Total		2	0	—		—		—		2	0
Deportivo Merlo	2008–09	Primera B Metropolitana	2	0	—		—		—		2	0
Deportivo Merlo	2009–10	Primera B Nacional	35	0	—		—		—		35	0
Deportivo Merlo	Total		37	0	—		—		—		37	0
Atlético Nacional	2010	Categoría Primera A	2	0	0	0	—		—		2	0
Atlético Nacional	2011	Categoría Primera A	8	0	16	0	—		—		24	0
Atlético Nacional	2012	Categoría Primera A	3	0	8	0	0	0	1	0	12	0
Atlético Nacional	2013	Categoría Primera A	14	0	6	0	8	0	—		28	0
Atlético Nacional	2014	Categoría Primera A	21	0	3	0	19	0	1	0	44	0
Atlético Nacional	2015	Categoría Primera A	29	0	2	0	3	0	2	0	36	0
Atlético Nacional	2016	Categoría Primera A	20	0	4	0	24	0	4	0	52	0
Atlético Nacional	2017	Categoría Primera A	38	0	3	0	6	0	2	0	49	0
Atlético Nacional	Total		135	0	42	0	60	0	10	0	247	0
River Plate	2017–18	Argentine Primera División	14	0	4	0	14	0	1	0	32	0
River Plate	2018–19	Argentine Primera División	20	0	5	0	11	0	7	0	43	0
River Plate	2019–20	Argentine Primera División	21	0	3	0	11	0	8	0	43	0
River Plate	2021	Argentine Primera División	34	0	0	0	9	0	1	0	44	0
River Plate	2022	Argentine Primera División	38	0	3	0	7	0	—		48	0
River Plate	2023	Argentine Primera División	41	0	1	0	8	0	2	0	52	0
River Plate	2024	Argentine Primera División	37	0	2	0	12	0	—		51	0
River Plate	2025	Argentine Primera División	33	0	4	0	10	0	4	0	51	0
River Plate	2026	Argentine Primera División	1	0	0	0	1	0	—		2	0
River Plate	Total		239	0	22	0	83	0	23	0	366	0
Atlético Nacional	2026	Categoría Primera A	16	0	4	0	—		—		20	0
Career total			429	0	68	0	143	0	33	0	672	0

^{1} Includes Copa Libertadores and Copa Sudamericana
^{2} Includes Superliga Colombiana, Recopa Sudamericana, FIFA Club World Cup, Supercopa Argentina, Copa de la Superliga and Trofeo de Campeones de la Liga Profesional

=== International ===
Appearances and goals by national team and year
National team	Year	Apps	Goals
Argentina	2018	3	0
Argentina	2019	8	0
Argentina	2020	4	0
Argentina	2021	1	0
Argentina	2022	2	0
Argentina	2023	1	0
Total		19	0

== Honours ==
Atlético Nacional

- Categoría Primera A: 2011-I, 2013-I, 2013-II, 2014-I, 2015-II, 2017-I
- Copa Colombia: 2012, 2013, 2016
- Superliga Colombiana: 2012, 2016
- Copa Sudamericana runner-up: 2014
- Copa Libertadores: 2016
- Recopa Sudamericana: 2017

River Plate

- Argentine Primera División: 2021, 2023
- Supercopa Argentina: 2017, 2019, 2023
- Trofeo de Campeones: 2021, 2023
- Copa Libertadores: 2018; runner-up: 2019
- Recopa Sudamericana: 2019
- Copa Argentina: 2019

Argentina

- FIFA World Cup: 2022
- Copa América: 2021, 2024
- CONMEBOL–UEFA Cup of Champions: 2022
