= Alan Picazzo =

Argentine footballer

Personal information
- Full name: Alan Nicolás Marcel Picazzo
- Date of birth: 21 June 1999 (age 27)
- Place of birth: Concepción del Uruguay, Argentina
- Height: 1.77 m (5 ft 9 1/2 in)
- Position: Right winger

Team information
- Current team: Mons Calpe
- Number: 17

Youth career
- 2003–2015: Atlético Uruguay
- 2015–2017: River Plate

Senior career*
Years	Team	Apps	(Gls)
2017–2021	River Plate	2	(1)
2019–2020	→ Villa Dálmine (loan)	10	(1)
2022	Fuente Cantos		
2022–2023	Alcalá	18	(17)
2023–2024	Dos Hermanas	20	(23)
2024	Chiclana	5	(3)
2024–2025	Coria	26	(8)
2025–2026	Inter Sevilla	27	(11)
2026–	Mons Calpe	9	(3)
- * Club domestic league appearances and goals as of 20 November 2026

Alan Nicolás Marcel Picazzo (born 21 June 1999) is an Argentine professional footballer who plays as a right winger for Mons Calpe in Gibraltar.

== Club career ==
Picazzo's career began with local club Atlético Uruguay in 2003, which preceded his signing with River Plate in 2015. He was moved into the Primera División team's senior squad during 2017–18, making his professional bow during an away win against San Martín (SJ); he netted his first goal in the process, scoring the club's final goal of a 1–3 victory. After one further appearance for River across 2018–19, Marcel Picazzo was loaned out on 8 August 2019 to Primera B Nacional's Villa Dálmine. He debuted against San Martín (T) on 25 August, before netting his first goal on 2 November away to Quilmes.

Picazzo returned to River Plate in early 2020, though would terminate his contract in February 2021 after no further competitive appearances for them.

== International career ==
Picazzo trained with the Argentina U20s in 2018.

== Career statistics ==
As of 17 February 2021.

Club statistics
Club	Season	League			Cup		League Cup		Continental		Other		Total	
Club	Season	Division	Apps	Goals	Apps	Goals	Apps	Goals	Apps	Goals	Apps	Goals	Apps	Goals
River Plate	2017–18	Primera División	1	1	0	0	—		0	0	0	0	1	1
River Plate	2018–19	Primera División	1	0	0	0	0	0	0	0	0	0	1	0
River Plate	2019–20	Primera División	0	0	0	0	0	0	0	0	0	0	0	0
River Plate	2020–21	Primera División	0	0	0	0	0	0	0	0	0	0	0	0
River Plate	Total		2	1	0	0	0	0	0	0	0	0	2	1
Villa Dálmine (loan)	2019–20	Primera B Nacional	10	1	0	0	—		—		0	0	10	1
Career total			12	2	0	0	0	0	0	0	0	0	12	2
