= Exequiel Palacios =

Argentine footballer (born 1998)

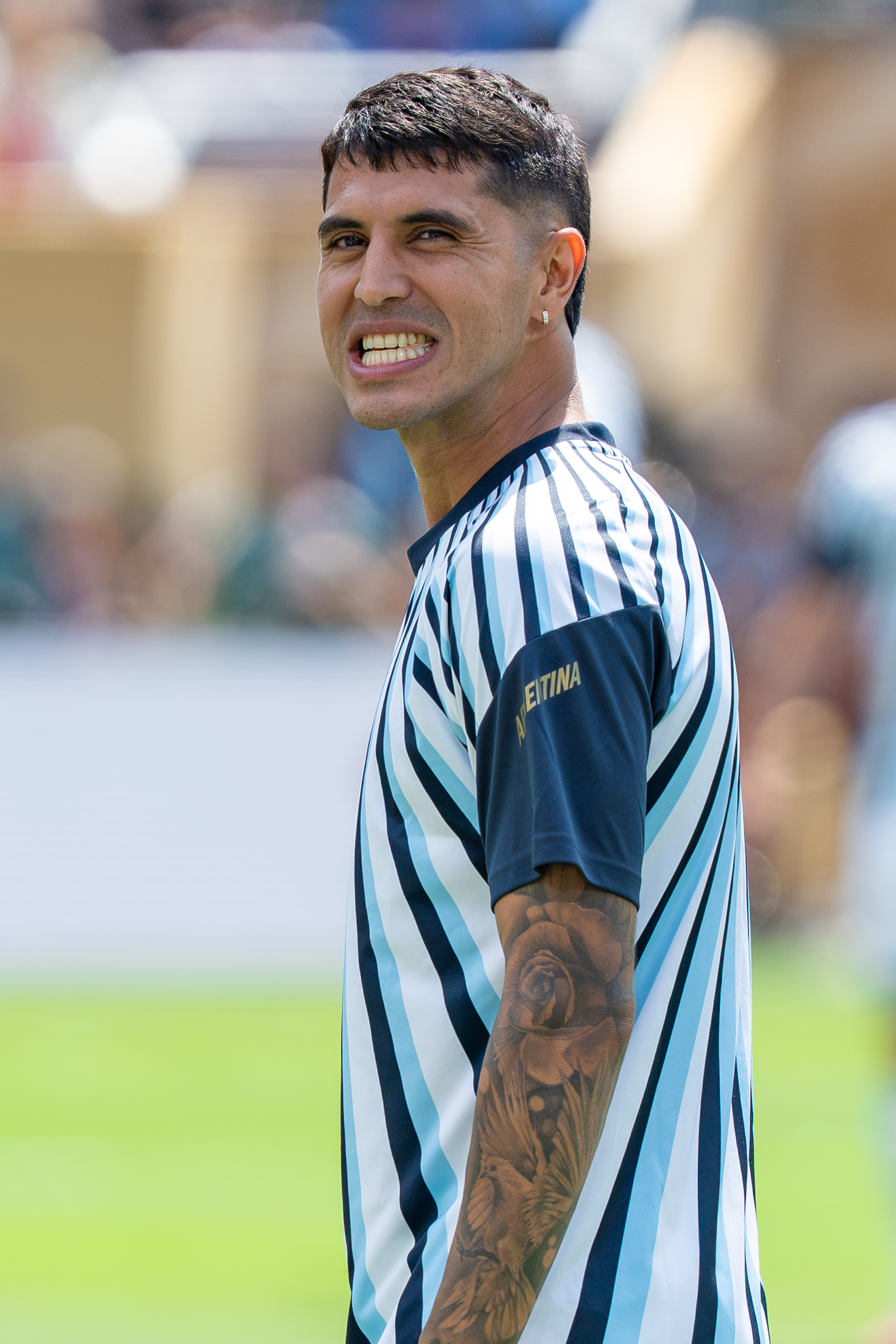
- Palacios with Argentina in 2026

Personal information
- Full name: Exequiel Alejandro Palacios
- Date of birth: 5 October 1998 (age 28)
- Place of birth: Famaillá, Tucumán, Argentina
- Height: 1.77 m (5 ft 10 in)
- Position: Central midfielder

Team information
- Current team: Ipswich Town
- Number: 25

Youth career
- –2015: Real Horslen

Senior career*
Years	Team	Apps	(Gls)
2015–2020	River Plate	48	(4)
2020–2026	Bayer Leverkusen	126	(11)
2026–	Ipswich Town	8	(0)

International career^{‡}
2015	Argentina U17	10	(1)
2017	Argentina U20	3	(0)
2018–	Argentina	43	(0)
Medal record
Men's football
Representing Argentina
FIFA World Cup
Winner	2022 Qatar
Runner-up	2026 Canada–Mexico–US
Copa América
Winner	2021 Brazil
Winner	2024 United States
CONMEBOL–UEFA Cup of Champions
Winner	2022 England
- * Club domestic league appearances and goals as of 17:15, 31 October 2026 (UTC) ‡ National team caps and goals as of 03:38, 4 October 2026 (UTC)

Exequiel Alejandro Palacios (Spanish pronunciation: [ekseˈkjel paˈla.sjos]; born 5 October 1998) is an Argentine professional footballer who plays as a central midfielder for Premier League club Ipswich Town and the Argentina national team.

Beginning his career with River Plate in 2015, Palacios won two domestic titles with the club. In January 2020, he moved to German Bundesliga side Bayer Leverkusen, and was a member of the Leverkusen squad that won the domestic double in the 2023–24 season (won the Bundesliga and DFB-Pokal). In 2026, he signed for English club Ipswich Town for a fee of €22.5 million.

== Club career ==
=== River Plate ===
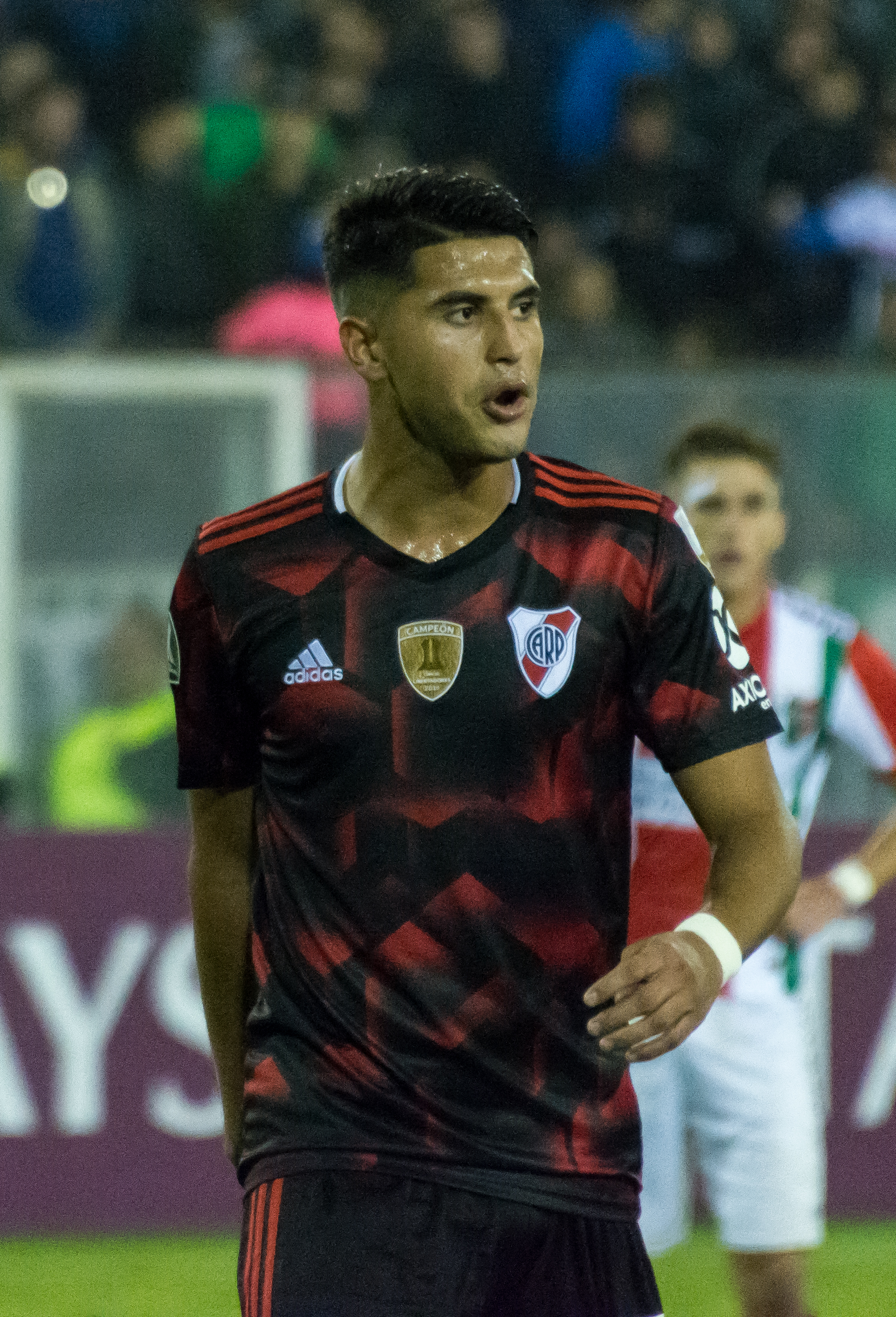
Palacios playing for River Plate in 2019

Palacios is a youth exponent from River Plate. He made his league debut on 8 November 2015 against Newell's Old Boys.

On 9 December 2018, Palacios won 2018 Copa Libertadores with River Plate. He played eleven matches including the finals against rivals Boca Juniors.

Palacios was part of 2018 South American Team of the Year.

Palacios made his final appearance for his boyhood club in the final of the Copa Argentina on 13 December 2019, playing 79 minutes of a 3–0 victory over Central Córdoba.

=== Bayer Leverkusen ===
On 16 December 2019, Bayer Leverkusen announced that Palacios would join the club on 1 January 2020, signing a five-and-a-half-year deal.

On 14 April 2024, Bayer Leverkusen won the 2023–24 Bundesliga championship, with Palacios being a part of the team. On 25 May, Leverkusen defeated 1. FC Kaiserslautern 1–0 in the DFB-Pokal final to complete the first domestic double in the club's history.

=== Ipswich Town ===
On 27 August 2026, Palacios signed for newly-promoted Premier League club Ipswich Town, on a four-year contract worth €22.5m (£19.2m).

== International career ==
Palacios made his international debut for Argentina on 8 September 2018 in a 3–0 international friendly against Guatemala.

On 12 November 2020, Palacios fractured a bone in his spine during a 1–1 draw with Paraguay in a World Cup qualifier and was expected be out for three months. Palacios sustained the injury in an aerial duel with Ángel Romero in the first half of the contest at La Bombonera and was replaced by Giovani Lo Celso, who took the corner from which Nicolas Gonzalez headed home Argentina's equaliser.

On 11 June 2021, Palacios was named by coach Lionel Scaloni in Argentina's 28-man squad for the 2021 Copa América. A month later, on 10 July, he played as a second-half substitute in Argentina's 1–0 victory over Brazil in the Copa América final. During the 2022 FIFA World Cup, Palacios featured in a 2–0 win over Mexico in the group stage phase, a 2–1 victory over Australia in the round of 16, and a 3–0 win over Croatia in their semi-finals. Argentina went on to defeat France on penalties in the final, with Palacios included in the squad as Argentina won their third World Cup title.

Palacios was additionally a member of the Argentina squads for the 2024 Copa América and the 2026 FIFA World Cup, winning the former.

== Career statistics ==
=== Club ===
As of match played 31 October 2026

Appearances and goals by club, season and competition
Club	Season	League			National cup (Note: Includes Copa Argentina, DFB-Pokal)		League cup		Continental		Other		Total	
Club	Season	Division	Apps	Goals	Apps	Goals	Apps	Goals	Apps	Goals	Apps	Goals	Apps	Goals
River Plate	2015	Argentine Primera División	1	0	0	0	—		0	0	0	0	1	0
River Plate	2016	Argentine Primera División	1	0	—		—		0	0	—		1	0
River Plate	2016–17	Argentine Primera División	8	0	1	1	—		0	0	—		9	1
River Plate	2017–18	Argentine Primera División	9	2	3	0	—		1 (Note: Appearance(s) in Copa Libertadores)	0	—		13	2
River Plate	2018–19	Argentine Primera División	14	1	9	2	—		11	1	4 (Note: Two appearances in Recopa Sudamericana, two appearances in FIFA Club World Cup)	0	38	4
River Plate	2019–20	Argentine Primera División	15	1	6	2	—		9	0	—		30	3
River Plate	Total		48	4	19	5	—		21	1	4	0	92	10
Bayer Leverkusen	2019–20	Bundesliga	3	0	2	0	—		2 (Note: Appearances in UEFA Europa League)	0	—		7	0
Bayer Leverkusen	2020–21	Bundesliga	9	0	2	0	—		2	0	—		13	0
Bayer Leverkusen	2021–22	Bundesliga	23	2	2	0	—		7	1	—		32	3
Bayer Leverkusen	2022–23	Bundesliga	25	4	1	0	—		8 (Note: Two appearances in UEFA Champions League, six appearances and one goal in UEFA Europa League)	1	—		34	5
Bayer Leverkusen	2023–24	Bundesliga	24	4	3	2	—		9	0	—		36	6
Bayer Leverkusen	2024–25	Bundesliga	24	1	4	0	—		10 (Note: Appearances in UEFA Champions League)	0	0	0	38	1
Bayer Leverkusen	2025–26	Bundesliga	18	0	2	0	—		5	0	—		25	0
Bayer Leverkusen	2026–27	Bundesliga	—		1	0	—		—		—		1	0
Bayer Leverkusen	Total		126	11	17	2	—		43	2	0	0	186	15
Ipswich Town	2026–27	Premier League	8	0	0	0	0	0	—		—		8	0
Career total			182	15	36	7	0	0	64	3	4	0	286	25

=== International ===
As of match played 3 October 2026

Appearances and goals by national team and year
National team	Year	Apps	Goals
Argentina	2018	2	0
Argentina	2019	2	0
Argentina	2020	2	0
Argentina	2021	11	0
Argentina	2022	6	0
Argentina	2023	5	0
Argentina	2024	4	0
Argentina	2025	5	0
Argentina	2026	6	0
Total		43	0

== Honours ==
River Plate

- Copa Argentina: 2016–17, 2018–19
- Copa Libertadores: 2018
- Recopa Sudamericana: 2019

Bayer Leverkusen

- Bundesliga: 2023–24
- DFB-Pokal: 2023–24; runner-up: 2019–20
- DFL-Supercup: 2024
- UEFA Europa League runner-up: 2023–24

Argentina

- FIFA World Cup: 2022; runner-up: 2026
- Copa América: 2021, 2024
- CONMEBOL–UEFA Cup of Champions: 2022

=== Individual ===
- South American Team of the Year: 2018
