= Cristian Ferreira =

Argentine footballer

Personal information
- Full name: Cristian Ezequiel Ferreira
- Date of birth: 12 September 1999 (age 27)
- Place of birth: Córdoba, Argentina
- Height: 1.72 m (5 ft 8 in)
- Position: Midfielder

Team information
- Current team: Académico de Viseu
- Number: 18

Youth career
- River Plate

Senior career*
Years	Team	Apps	(Gls)
2017–2024	River Plate	30	(4)
2021	→ Colón (loan)	21	(3)
2022–2023	→ Newell's Old Boys (loan)	40	(4)
2024	→ San Lorenzo (loan)	14	(3)
2024–2026	Argentinos Juniors	11	(0)
2026–	Académico de Viseu	2	(0)

International career
2019	Argentina U20	2	(1)
- * Club domestic league appearances and goals as of 6 September 2026

Cristian Ezequiel Ferreira (born 12 September 1999) is an Argentine professional footballer who plays in midfield for Primeira Liga club Académico de Viseu.

== Career ==
Ferreira was born in Córdoba. He made his debut for River Plate in the Argentine Primera División on 29 October 2017 coming on a substitute for Exequiel Palacios against Talleres Córdoba.

On 19 February 2021, Ferreira moved to Argentine Primera División side Colón, on a loan deal until the end of the season. Ferreira returned to River Plate ahead of the 2022 season. Until the summer, he played only two games for River Plate. On 29 June 2022 Newell's Old Boys confirmed, that Ferreira had joined the club on an 18-month loan contract costing $200,000 up front with a purchase option set at $2,000,000.

On 7 July 2026, Ferreira signed a one-season contract with Académico de Viseu in Portugal.

== Career statistics ==
As of match played 1 July 2019

Club statistics
Club	Season	League			Cup		Continental		Total	
Club	Season	Division	Apps	Goals	Apps	Goals	Apps	Goals	Apps	Goals
River Plate	2017–18	Argentine Primera División	2	0	0	0	—		2	0
River Plate	2018–19	Argentine Primera División	14	4	5	1	4	1	23	6
Career totals			16	4	5	1	4	1	25	6
