= Robert Rojas =

Paraguayan footballer (born 1996)

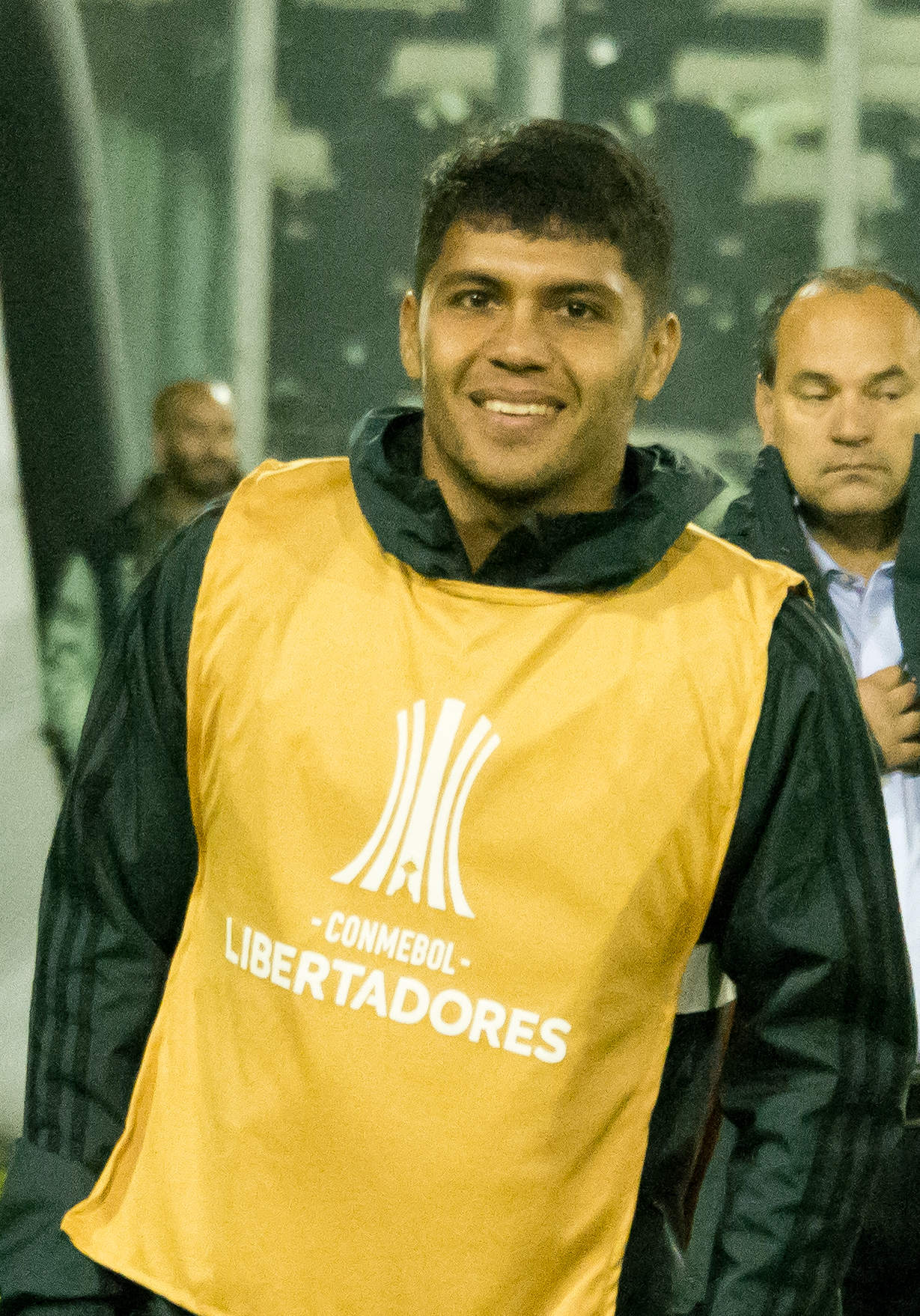
- Rojas with River Plate in 2019

Personal information
- Full name: Robert Samuel Rojas Chávez
- Date of birth: 30 April 1996 (age 30)
- Place of birth: Peguahomi, Concepción, Paraguay
- Height: 1.77 m (5 ft 10 in)
- Positions: Centre-back; right-back

Team information
- Current team: Libertad (on loan from Olimpia)
- Number: 3

Youth career
- 2013–2016: Guaraní

Senior career*
Years	Team	Apps	(Gls)
2017–2019	Guaraní	72	(5)
2019–2024	River Plate	70	(8)
2023	→ Tigre (loan)	12	(1)
2024	→ Vasco da Gama (loan)	13	(0)
2025–	Olimpia	17	(0)
2025–	→ Libertad (loan)	5	(0)

International career^{‡}
2019–	Paraguay	22	(1)
- * Club domestic league appearances and goals as of 12 August 2025 ‡ National team caps and goals as of 7 September 2023

Robert Samuel Rojas Chávez (born 30 April 1996), is a Paraguayan professional footballer who plays as a centre-back or right-back for paraguayan club Libertad, on loan from Olimpia and the Paraguay national team.

== Club career ==
Rojas, who arrived in Guaraní when he was 17 years old acknowledged that he was about to leave football more than once because he missed his family, played as a right back for most of his youth training, but in his second year in the Asunción team he was run for playing as a centre back. Therefore, it is characterized by its great speed.

The one born in the small town of Peguahomi became a key part of the Cacique team, especially since Julio César Cáceres - his great referent in the position- was suspended by doping at the beginning of March and a place was left vacant in the rear.

The defender, is one of the young player with projection in the football of his country.

On 18 January 2019, Rojas joined Argentine Primera División club River Plate, signing a four-year contract.

== International career ==
On 2 March 2019, Rojas received a call-up to the Paraguay national team from Eduardo Berizzo ahead of that month's friendlies with Peru and Mexico. He made his international debut on 5 September 2019, in a 2–0 loss to Japan.

=== International goals ===
Scores and results list Paraguay's goal tally first.

No	Date	Venue	Opponent	Score	Result	Competition
1.	10 September 2019	Amman International Stadium, Amman, Jordan	Jordan	3–2	4–2	Friendly

== Career statistics ==
=== Club ===
As of match played 8 May 2023

Appearances and goals by club, season and competition
Club	Season	League			Cup		Continental		Other		Total	
Club	Season	Division	Apps	Goals	Apps	Goals	Apps	Goals	Apps	Goals	Apps	Goals
Guaraní	2017	Paraguayan Primera División	34	4	0	0	3	0	0	0	37	4
Guaraní	2018	Paraguayan Primera División	38	1	0	0	4	0	0	0	42	1
Guaraní	Total		72	5	0	0	7	0	0	0	79	5
River Plate	2018–19	Argentine Primera División	8	1	1	0	1	0	1 (Note: Appearances in Copa de la Superliga)	0	11	1
River Plate	2019–20	Argentine Primera División	13	1	0	0	4	0	1 (Note: Appearances in Supercopa Argentina)	0	18	1
River Plate	2020–21	Argentine Primera División	7	2	0	0	7	2	1 (Note: Appearances in Trofeo de Campeones de la Liga Profesional)	0	15	4
River Plate	2021	Argentine Primera División	22	2	1	0	4	0	1	0	28	2
River Plate	2022	Argentine Primera División	3	0	0	0	1	0	0	0	4	0
River Plate	2023	Argentine Primera División	7	0	0	0	1	0	0	0	9	0
River Plate	Total		60	6	2	0	18	2	4	0	85	8
Career total			132	11	2	0	25	2	4	0	164	13
