= Bruno Zuculini =

Argentine footballer (born 1993)

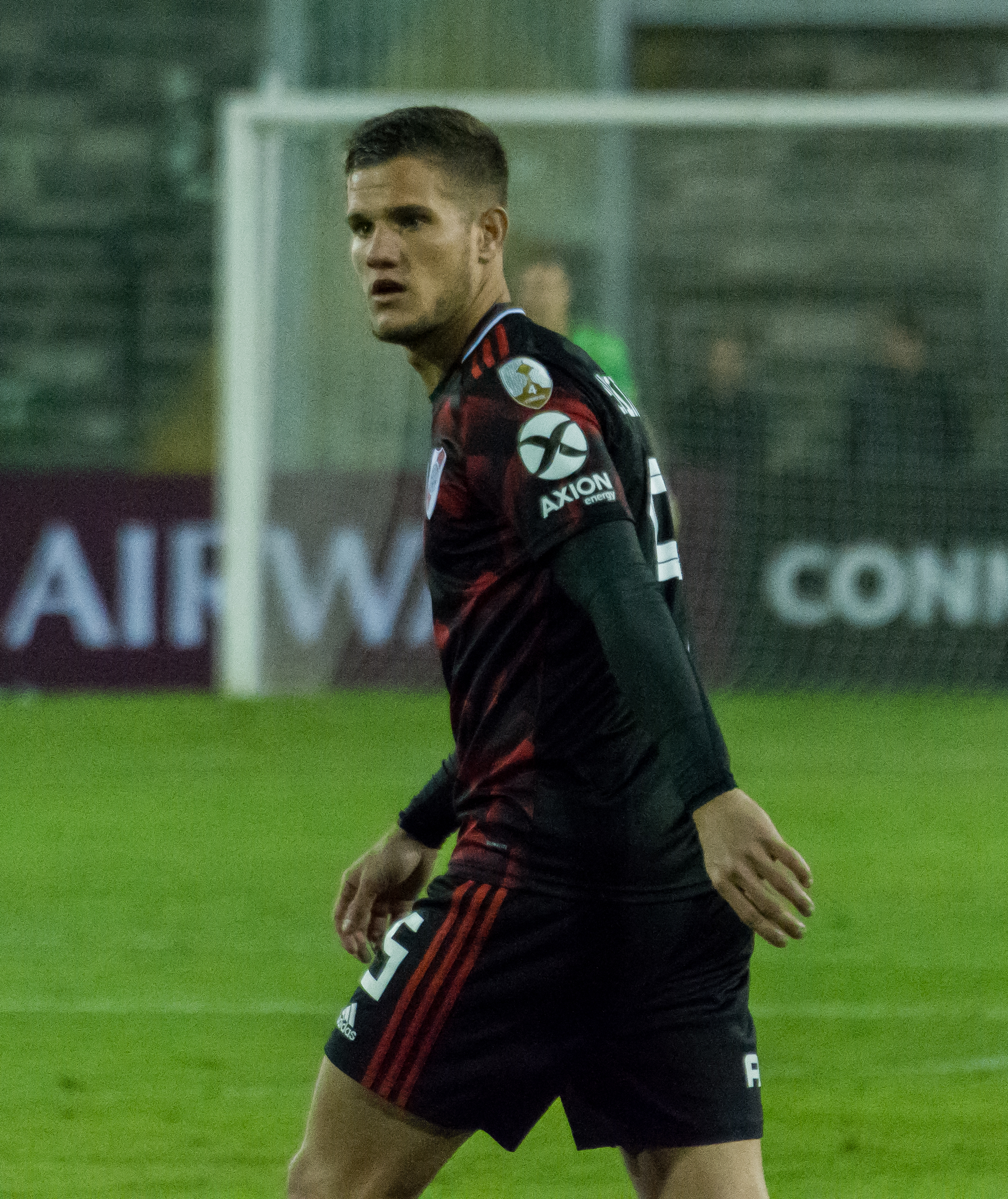
- Zuculini with River Plate in 2019

Personal information
- Full name: Bruno Zuculini
- Date of birth: 2 April 1993 (age 33)
- Place of birth: Belén de Escobar, Argentina
- Height: 1.82 m (6 ft 0 in)
- Position: Central midfielder

Team information
- Current team: Nacional
- Number: 36

Youth career
- Racing Club

Senior career*
Years	Team	Apps	(Gls)
2010–2014	Racing Club	92	(10)
2014–2017	Manchester City	0	(0)
2014–2015	→ Valencia (loan)	1	(0)
2015	→ Córdoba (loan)	8	(0)
2015–2016	→ Middlesbrough (loan)	5	(0)
2016	→ AEK Athens (loan)	4	(0)
2016–2017	→ Rayo Vallecano (loan)	9	(0)
2017	→ Hellas Verona (loan)	16	(1)
2017–2018	Hellas Verona	16	(2)
2018–2024	River Plate	85	(4)
2024–2026	Racing Club	66	(4)
2026–	Nacional	9	(0)

International career^{‡}
2011	Argentina U20	8	(2)
- * Club domestic league appearances and goals as of 17:57, 4 October 2026 (UTC) ‡ National team caps and goals as of 20 May 2014

Bruno Zuculini (born 2 April 1993) is an Argentine professional footballer who plays as a central midfielder for Nacional.

== Club career ==
=== Racing Club ===
Born in Belén de Escobar, Zuculini graduated from Racing Club's youth setup. He made his first-team debut on 13 February 2010, starting in a 1–0 away loss against Gimnasia La Plata for the Argentine Primera División championship, and aged only 16.

Zuculini appeared in a further six matches during the campaign, and also played 12 during the 2011–12. On 17 June 2012, he scored his first professional goal, but in a 4–2 away loss against Atlético de Rafaela.

In the 2012–13 season, after the departures of Giovanni Moreno and Lucas Nahuel Castro, Zuculini was an ever-present figure for the Avellaneda side, appearing in 32 matches and scoring five goals. On 27 September 2013, he renewed his link with the club, running until 2016.

=== Manchester City ===
On 23 July 2014, Zuculini scored the opening goal of Manchester City's pre-season match against Sporting Kansas City. On 8 August, he was officially confirmed as a City player, being assigned the number 36 shirt.

Zuculini made his competitive debut two days later in the 2014 FA Community Shield, replacing Yaya Touré after 60 minutes of an eventual 3–0 defeat to Arsenal at Wembley Stadium. On 10 July 2015, it was confirmed that he would be in the club's squad for their pre-season tour in Australia.

==== Valencia (loan) ====
On 19 August 2014, Zuculini was loaned to La Liga's Valencia CF in a season-long deal. He made his debut in the competition on 29 August 2014, coming on at half time for André Gomes in a 3–0 home win against Málaga CF.

On 30 January 2015, Zuculini's loan was rescinded, after appearing just 45 minutes for the Che.

==== Córdoba (loan) ====
Hours after rescinding with Valencia, Zuculini joined fellow league team Córdoba CF on loan until June. The team were relegated in last place in the league, and Spanish newspaper Marca named him in their worst team of the season.

==== Middlesbrough (loan) ====
Following loan spells in Spain, Zuculini made his first loan move to an English club on 26 October 2015 as he joined Championship club Middlesbrough on a month-long loan.

On 25 November 2015, the loan was extended to 2 January 2016.

==== AEK Athens (loan) ====
Zuculini was on loan at AEK Athens until the end of the 2016 Super League Greece campaign. On 4 February 2016, he made his debut with the club, in an away 1–0 win against Iraklis at Kaftanzoglio Stadium for Greek Football Cup helping his club to advance to semi finals. On 23 February 2016, Argentine midfielder Zuculini suffered a serious fracture in the metatarsal and had to return to England to undergo surgery.

==== Rayo Vallecano (loan) ====
Zuculini signed on loan for Rayo Vallecano until the end of the 2016–17 Segunda División campaign. On 17 January, after only nine league matches, his loan was cut short and he joined his brother at Verona.

=== Hellas Verona ===
After spending the second half of the 2016–17 season on loan at Hellas Verona, Zuculini signed a permanent deal with the club on 11 July 2017.

== Personal life ==
Zuculini's older brother Franco is also a footballer and a midfielder. He too trained at Racing Club, with both playing together in 2011.

== Career statistics ==
As of match played 20 April 2023

Appearances and goals by club, season and competition
Club	Season	League			National Cup		League Cup		Continental		Other		Total	
Club	Season	Division	Apps	Goals	Apps	Goals	Apps	Goals	Apps	Goals	Apps	Goals	Apps	Goals
Racing Club	2009–10	Primera División	7	0	0	0	—		—		—		7	0
Racing Club	2010–11	Primera División	12	0	0	0	—		—		—		12	0
Racing Club	2011–12	Primera División	15	1	4	0	—		—		—		19	1
Racing Club	2012–13	Primera División	32	5	0	0	—		2 (Note: Appearances in Copa Sudamericana)	0	—		34	5
Racing Club	2013–14	Primera División	26	4	0	0	—		2	0	—		27	4
Racing Club	Total		92	10	4	0	—		4	0	—		100	10
Manchester City	2014–15	Premier League	0	0	0	0	0	0	0	0	1 (Note: Appearance in FA Community Shield)	0	1	0
Manchester City	2015–16	Premier League	0	0	0	0	0	0	0	0	—		0	0
Manchester City	Total		0	0	0	0	0	0	0	0	1	0	1	0
Valencia (loan)	2014–15	La Liga	1	0	0	0	—		—		—		1	0
Córdoba (loan)	2014–15	La Liga	8	0	0	0	—		—		—		8	0
Middlesbrough (loan)	2015–16	Championship	5	0	1	0	0	0	—		—		6	0
AEK Athens (loan)	2015–16	Super League Greece	3	0	1	0	0	0	—		—		4	0
Rayo Vallecano (loan)	2016–17	Segunda División	9	0	2	0	—		—		—		11	0
Verona (loan)	2016–17	Serie B	16	1	0	0	—		—		—		16	1
Verona	2017–18	Serie A	16	2	2	1	—		—		—		18	3
River Plate	2017–18	Primera División	8	0	0	0	—		6 (Note: Appearances in Copa Libertadores)	0	1 (Note: Appearance in Supercopa Argentina)	0	15	0
River Plate	2018–19	Primera División	14	0	2	0	2 (Note: Appearances in Copa de la Liga)	0	4	0	3 (Note: Appearances in Recopa Sudamericana, FIFA Club World Cup, and Torneo de Verano)	1	25	1
River Plate	2019–20	Primera División	6	0	1	0	0	0	2	0	1	0	10	0
River Plate	2020–21	Primera División	8	1	2	0	0	0	4	2	0	0	14	3
River Plate	2021	Primera División	23	2	0	0	0	0	3	0	1 (Note: Appearance in Trofeo de Campeones)	0	27	2
River Plate	2022	Primera División	14	0	1	1	0	0	4	0	0	0	19	1
River Plate	2023	Primera División	1	0	0	0	0	0	0	0	0	0	1	0
River Plate	Total		74	3	6	1	2	0	23	2	6	1	111	7
Career total			223	16	16	2	2	0	27	2	7	1	276	21

== Honours ==
AEK Athens

- Greek Cup: 2015–16

River Plate

- Supercopa Argentina: 2017, 2019
- Copa Argentina: 2018–19
- Copa Libertadores: 2018
- Recopa Sudamericana: 2019
- Primera División: 2021, 2023
- Trofeo de Campeones: 2021

Racing Club

- Copa Sudamericana: 2024
- Recopa Sudamericana: 2025
