= Luciano Lollo =

Argentine footballer

Personal information
- Date of birth: 29 March 1987 (age 39)
- Place of birth: Alejo Ledesma, Córdoba, Argentina
- Height: 1.84 m (6 ft 0 in)
- Position: Centre-back

Youth career
- Belgrano

Senior career*
Years	Team	Apps	(Gls)
2007–2014	Belgrano	195	(14)
2014–2016	Racing Club	46	(4)
2016–2020	River Plate	11	(1)
2019–2020	→ Banfield (loan)	17	(1)
2020–2022	Banfield	59	(5)
2022–2025	Estudiantes	67	(3)
2025	Newell's Old Boys	23	(3)
- * Club domestic league appearances and goals as of 18:22, 25 November 2025 (UTC)

Luciano Lollo (born 29 March 1987) is an Argentine professional footballer who plays as a centre-back.

== Honours ==
Racing Club

- Argentine Primera División: 2014

River Plate

- Copa Argentina: 2015–16, 2016–17
- Supercopa Argentina: 2017
- Recopa Sudamericana: 2016, 2019
- Copa Libertadores: 2018

Estudiantes de La Plata

- Copa Argentina: 2023
- Copa de la Liga Profesional: 2024
- Trofeo de Campeones de la Liga Profesional: 2024
