= Nahuel Gallardo =

Argentine footballer (born 1998)

Personal information
- Full name: Nahuel Ezequiel Gallardo
- Date of birth: 9 May 1998 (age 28)
- Place of birth: Buenos Aires, Argentina
- Height: 1.79 m (5 ft 10 in)
- Position: Left-back

Team information
- Current team: Delfín
- Number: 5

Youth career
- River Plate

Senior career*
Years	Team	Apps	(Gls)
2017–2023	River Plate	7	(0)
2020–2021	→ Defensa y Justicia (loan)	11	(0)
2021–2022	→ Colón (loan)	13	(0)
2022–2023	→ Once Caldas (loan)	17	(0)
2023–2024	Sarmiento	10	(0)
2024	Independiente Rivadavia	1	(0)
2025–	Delfín	11	(1)
- * Club domestic league appearances and goals as of 17:54, 27 May 2025 (UTC)

Nahuel Ezequiel Gallardo (born 9 May 1998) is an Argentine professional footballer who plays as a left-back for Ecuadorian Serie A club Delfín.

== Career ==
Gallardo started off in the youth of River Plate. He was promoted into the senior squad in October 2017 for an Argentine Primera División match with Talleres, he played the full ninety minutes of a 4–0 defeat at the Estadio Mario Alberto Kempes; with his father, Marcelo, as manager of River Plate.

On 31 January 2020, Gallardo signed for Defensa y Justicia on loan.

On 13 July 2021, Gallardo joined Colón on loan.

On 11 July 2022, Gallardo joined Colombian side Once Caldas on loan.

== Personal life ==
Gallardo is the son of manager and former footballer Marcelo Gallardo. He is the brother of fellow footballers Santino and Matias Gallardo.

== Career statistics ==
As of 27 May 2025.

Club statistics
Club	Season	League			Cup (Note: Includes the Copa Argentina)		League Cup		Continental (Note: Includes the Copa Libertadores and Copa Sudamericana)		Other		Total	
Club	Season	Division	Apps	Goals	Apps	Goals	Apps	Goals	Apps	Goals	Apps	Goals	Apps	Goals
River Plate	2017–18	Argentine Primera División	1	0	0	0	—		0	0	0	0	1	0
River Plate	2018–19	Argentine Primera División	4	0	0	0	—		0	0	0	0	4	0
River Plate	2019–20	Argentine Primera División	2	0	0	0	—		0	0	0	0	2	0
River Plate	Total		7	0	0	0	—		0	0	0	0	7	0
Defensa y Justicia (loan)	2020	Argentine Primera División	9	0	0	0	1	0	1	0	0	0	11	0
Defensa y Justicia (loan)	2021	Argentine Primera División	2	0	0	0	0	0	5	0	0	0	7	0
Defensa y Justicia (loan)	Total		11	0	0	0	1	0	6	0	0	0	18	0
Colón (loan)	2021	Argentine Primera División	9	0	0	0	0	0	0	0	0	0	9	0
Colón (loan)	2022	Argentine Primera División	4	0	1	0	0	0	2	0	0	0	7	0
Colón (loan)	Total		13	0	1	0	0	0	2	0	0	0	16	0
Once Caldas (loan)	2022	Colombian Primera A	8	0	0	0	0	0	0	0	0	0	8	0
Once Caldas (loan)	2023	Colombian Primera A	9	0	0	0	0	0	0	0	0	0	9	0
Once Caldas (loan)	Total		17	0	0	0	0	0	0	0	0	0	17	0
Sarmiento	2023	Argentine Primera División	0	0	0	0	6	0	—		0	0	6	0
Sarmiento	2024	Argentine Primera División	2	0	1	0	2	0	—		0	0	5	0
Sarmiento	Total		2	0	1	0	8	0	0	0	0	0	11	0
Independiente Rivadavia	2024	Argentine Primera División	1	0	0	0	0	0	—		0	0	1	0
Delfín	2025	Ecuadorian Serie A	11	1	0	0	0	0	—		0	0	11	1
Career total			62	1	2	0	9	0	8	0	0	0	79	1
