= 2025 Club Atlético River Plate season =

Club Atlético River Plate
2025 season
- Manager: Marcelo Gallardo
- Stadium: Estadio Monumental
- Primera División: League: 4th Apertura: Quarter-Finals; Clausura: Round of 16
- Copa Argentina: Semi-Finals
- Copa Libertadores: Quarter-Finals
- FIFA Club World Cup: Group stage
- Supercopa Internacional: Runners-up
- Top goalscorer: League: Miguel Borja (7); All: Sebastián Driussi (10)
- Average home league attendance: 84,782
- Biggest win: River 6–2 Independiente del Valle
- Biggest defeat: Palmeiras 3–1 River (5–2 agg.)

The 2025 season was the 124th year of competition for Club Atlético River Plate, an Argentinian football club based in Buenos Aires. It is their 14th consecutive season in the Argentine Primera División, the top flight of football in the country. The club will also compete in the FIFA Club World Cup, Copa Argentina, and Copa Libertadores.

== Season events ==
On 17 January, Major League Soccer club Austin FC announced that Sebastián Driussi had left the club to re-sign for River Plate, River formalising the move on 20 January.

Also on 20 January, River announced the return of Gonzalo Montiel from Sevilla.

On 12 March, River announced the signing of Kevin Castaño from Krasnodar.

On 10 June, River announced their squad for the FIFA Club World Cup.

On 13 June, Real Madrid announced the signing of Franco Mastantuono from River, with the forward joining the Spanish club on 18th birthday, 14 August 2025.

On 11 July, River announced the signing of Maximiliano Salas from Racing Club.

On 17 July, River announced the signing of Juan Quintero from América de Cali.

On 18 July, River announced that they had extended their contract with Facundo Colidio until December 2027.

On 24 July, River announced the signing of Juan Portillo and Matías Galarza from Talleres.

== Squad ==
As of match played 24 November 2025

No.	Name	Nationality	Position	Date of birth (age)	Signed from	Signed in	Contract ends	Apps.	Goals
Goalkeepers
1	Franco Armani	(Argentina)	GK	16 October 1986 (aged 39)	Atlético Nacional	2018		357	0
25	Conan Ledesma	(Argentina)	GK	13 February 1993 (aged 32)	Cádiz	2024		7	0
41	Santiago Beltrán	(Argentina)	GK	4 October 2004 (aged 21)	Academy	2024		0	0
42	Jeremías Martinet	(Argentina)	GK	30 August 2005 (aged 20)	Academy	2025		0	0
Defenders
4	Gonzalo Montiel	(Argentina)	DF	1 January 1997 (aged 28)	Sevilla	2025		176	11
6	Germán Pezzella	(Argentina)	DF	27 June 1991 (aged 34)	Real Betis	2024		107	6
13	Lautaro Rivero	(Argentina)	DF	1 November 2003 (aged 22)	Internacional	2024		16	0
14	Sebastián Boselli	(Uruguay)	DF	4 December 2003 (aged 21)	Defensor Sporting	2023		19	1
16	Fabricio Bustos	(Argentina)	DF	28 April 1996 (aged 29)	Internacional	2024		43	0
17	Paulo Díaz	(Chile)	DF	25 August 1994 (aged 31)	Al-Ahli	2019		215	12
20	Milton Casco	(Argentina)	DF	11 April 1988 (aged 37)	Newell's Old Boys	2015		316	5
21	Marcos Acuña	(Argentina)	DF	28 October 1991 (aged 34)	Sevilla	2024		55	1
28	Lucas Martínez Quarta	(Argentina)	DF	10 May 1996 (aged 29)	Fiorentina	2025		143	8
36	Ulises Giménez	(Argentina)	DF	1 January 2006 (aged 19)	Defensa y Justicia	2024		1	0
Midfielders
5	Juan Portillo	(Argentina)	MF	18 May 2000 (aged 25)	Talleres	2025		17	0
8	Maximiliano Meza	(Argentina)	MF	15 December 1992 (aged 32)	Monterrey	2024		44	7
10	Juan Quintero	(Colombia)	MF	18 January 1993 (aged 32)	América de Cali	2025		120	19
18	Pity Martínez	(Argentina)	MF	13 June 1993 (aged 32)	Al Nassr	2023		191	36
22	Kevin Castaño	(Colombia)	MF	29 September 2000 (aged 25)	Krasnodar	2025		38	0
23	Matías Galarza	(Paraguay)	MF	11 February 2002 (aged 23)	Talleres	2025		14	0
24	Enzo Pérez	(Argentina)	MF	22 February 1986 (aged 39)	Estudiantes (LP)	2025		276	8
26	Ignacio Fernández	(Argentina)	MF	12 January 1990 (aged 35)	Atlético Mineiro	2023		202	37
31	Santiago Simón	(Argentina)	MF	13 June 2002 (aged 23)	Academy	2020		145	6
33	Agustín De La Cuesta	(Argentina)	MF	4 January 2006 (aged 19)	Academy	2025		1	0
34	Giuliano Galoppo	(Argentina)	MF	18 June 1999 (aged 26)	on loan from São Paulo	2025		34	7
35	Giorgio Costantini	(Brazil)	MF	16 April 2006 (aged 19)	Academy	2025		3	0
37	Thiago Acosta	(Argentina)	MF	25 February 2005 (aged 20)	Academy	2025		4	0
39	Santiago Lencina	(Argentina)	MF	4 September 2005 (aged 20)	Academy	2024		22	3
40	Agustín Obregón	(Argentina)	MF	11 February 2006 (aged 19)	Academy	2025		1	0
47	Juan Meza	(Argentina)	MF	14 March 2008 (aged 17)	Academy	2025		8	0
Forwards
7	Maximiliano Salas	(Argentina)	FW	1 December 1997 (aged 27)	Racing Club	2025		18	4
9	Miguel Borja	(Colombia)	FW	26 January 1993 (aged 32)	Atlético Junior	2022		158	61
11	Facundo Colidio	(Argentina)	FW	4 January 2000 (aged 25)	Inter Milan	2023	2027	112	27
19	Sebastián Driussi	(Argentina)	FW	9 February 1996 (aged 29)	Austin FC	2025		141	38
27	Bautista Dadín	(Argentina)	FW	20 May 2006 (aged 19)	Academy	2025		4	0
30	Cristian Jaime	(Argentina)	FW	14 July 2006 (aged 19)	Academy	2025		3	0
32	Agustín Ruberto	(Argentina)	FW	14 January 2006 (aged 19)	Academy	2024		17	2
38	Ian Subiabre	(Argentina)	FW	7 January 2007 (aged 18)	Academy	2024		22	2
44	Joaquin Freitas	(Argentina)	FW	2 December 2006 (aged 18)	Academy	2025		1	0
Also under contract
	Federico Gattoni	(Argentina)	DF	16 February 1999 (aged 26)	on loan from Sevilla	2024		7	0
Out on loan
19	Gonzalo Tapia	(Chile)	FW	18 February 2002 (aged 23)	Universidad Católica	2025		7	0
37	Lucas Lavagnino	(Argentina)	GK	22 August 2004 (aged 21)	Academy	2023		0	0
Left during the season
5	Matías Kranevitter	(Argentina)	MF	21 May 1993 (aged 32)	Monterrey	2023		145	0
9	Matías Rojas	(Paraguay)	MF	3 November 1995 (aged 30)	Inter Miami	2025		8	1
10	Manuel Lanzini	(Argentina)	MF	15 February 1993 (aged 32)	West Ham United	2023		150	15
14	Leandro González Pírez	(Argentina)	DF	26 February 1992 (aged 33)	Inter Miami	2024		144	7
29	Rodrigo Aliendro	(Argentina)	MF	16 February 1991 (aged 34)	Colón	2022		109	5
30	Franco Mastantuono	(Argentina)	FW	14 August 2007 (aged 18)	Academy	2024		64	10
36	Pablo Solari	(Argentina)	FW	22 March 2001 (aged 24)	Colo-Colo	2022		109	30
	Augusto Batalla	(Argentina)	GK	30 April 1996 (aged 29)	Academy	2016		54	0
	Adam Bareiro	(Paraguay)	FW	26 July 1996 (aged 29)	San Lorenzo	2024		16	0

== Transfers ==
=== In ===
Date	Position	Nationality	Name	From	Fee	Ref.
3 January 2025	MF	(Argentina)	Enzo Pérez	Estudiantes (LP)	Undisclosed	
3 January 2025	FW	(Chile)	Gonzalo Tapia	Universidad Católica	Undisclosed	
3 January 2025	MF	(Paraguay)	Matías Rojas	Inter Miami	Undisclosed	
20 January 2025	DF	(Argentina)	Gonzalo Montiel	Sevilla	Undisclosed	
20 January 2025	FW	(Argentina)	Sebastián Driussi	Austin FC	Undisclosed	
12 March 2025	MF	(Colombia)	Kevin Castaño	Krasnodar	Undisclosed	
11 July 2025	FW	(Argentina)	Maximiliano Salas	Racing	Undisclosed	
17 July 2025	MF	(Colombia)	Juan Quintero	América de Cali	Undisclosed	
24 July 2025	MF	(Argentina)	Juan Portillo	Talleres	Undisclosed	
24 July 2025	MF	(Paraguay)	Matías Galarza	Talleres	Undisclosed	

=== Out ===
Date	Position	Nationality	Name	To	Fee	Ref.
2 January 2025	MF	(Argentina)	José Paradela	Club Necaxa	Undisclosed	
15 January 2025	MF	(Uruguay)	Nicolás Fonseca	Club León	Undisclosed	
11 February 2025	FW	(Argentina)	Pablo Solari	Spartak Moscow	Undisclosed	
1 July 2025	GK	(Argentina)	Augusto Batalla	Rayo Vallecano	Undisclosed	
8 July 2025	FW	(Paraguay)	Adam Bareiro	Fortaleza	Undisclosed	
14 August 2025	FW	(Argentina)	Franco Mastantuono	Real Madrid	Undisclosed	
19 August 2025	MF	(Paraguay)	Matías Rojas	Portland Timbers	Undisclosed	
21 August 2025	MF	(Argentina)	Manuel Lanzini	Vélez Sarsfield	Undisclosed	
4 September 2025	MF	(Argentina)	Matías Kranevitter	Fatih Karagümrük	Undisclosed	

== Exhibition matches ==
17 January 2025	Universidad de Chile	1–2	(Argentina) River Plate	Concepción, Chile
ART (UTC−3)	L.Fernández (yellow card) 15' (red card) 44'; Poblete 18'	Report	Lanzini 9'; Pérez (yellow card) 44'; Casco (yellow card) 60'; I.Fernández (yellow card) 74'; Martínez Quarta (yellow card) 81'; Borja 84'	Stadium: Estadio Ester Roa; Attendance: 25,000; Referee: Manuel Vergara

21 January 2025	River Plate (Argentina)	2–0	Mexico	Buenos Aires
19:00 ART (UTC−3)	Galoppo 7'; Borja 33'; Casco (yellow card) 35'	Report	Álvarez (yellow card) 44'; Lira (yellow card) 82'	Stadium: Estadio Monumental; Attendance: 84,593; Referee: Sebastian Martinez

19 July 2025 Clash of Legends	River Plate (Argentina)	2–0	(Spain) Barcelona	Buenos Aires
ART (UTC−3)	Domínguez; Ortega	Report		Stadium: Estadio Monumental

== Competitions ==
=== Overall record ===
Competition	First match	Last match	Starting round	Final position	Record							
Competition	First match	Last match	Starting round	Final position	Pld	W	D	L	GF	GA	GD	Win %
Primera División	26 January 2025	24 November 2025	Matchday 1	4th	35	15	12	8	47	28	+19	42.86
Copa Argentina	22 March 2025	24 October 2025	Round of 64	Semi-final	5	3	2	0	6	0	+6	60.00
Copa Libertadores	2 April 2025	24 September 2025	Group stage	Quarter-final	10	3	5	2	16	13	+3	30.00
FIFA Club World Cup	17 June 2025	25 June 2025	Group stage	Group stage	3	1	1	1	3	3	+0	33.33
2023 Supercopa Internacional	5 March 2025		Final	Runner-up	1	0	1	0	0	0	+0	0.00
Total					54	22	21	11	72	44	+28	40.74

Last updated: 24 November 2025
Source: Competitions

=== Primera División ===
Pos	Team	Pld	W	D	L	GF	GA	GD	Pts	Qualification or relegation
2	Boca Juniors	32	18	8	6	52	23	+29	62	Qualification for Copa Libertadores group stage
3	Argentinos Juniors	32	16	9	7	42	22	+20	57	Qualification for Copa Libertadores second stage
4	River Plate	32	14	11	7	41	24	+17	53	Qualification for Copa Sudamericana group stage
5	Racing	32	16	5	11	42	29	+13	53	Qualification for Copa Sudamericana group stage
6	Deportivo Riestra	32	13	13	6	32	19	+13	52	Qualification for Copa Sudamericana group stage

Source: AFA
Rules for classification: 1) points; 2) goal difference; 3) goals scored; 4) head-to-head results 5) fair play ranking 6) drawing of lots.

==== Torneo Apertura ====
===== Group stage =====
====== League table ======
Pos	Team	Pld	W	D	L	GF	GA	GD	Pts	Qualification
1	Rosario Central	16	10	5	1	22	8	+14	35	Advance to round of 16
2	River Plate	16	8	7	1	21	9	+12	31	Advance to round of 16
3	Independiente	16	8	5	3	23	12	+11	29	Advance to round of 16
4	San Lorenzo	16	7	6	3	14	10	+4	27	Advance to round of 16
5	Deportivo Riestra	16	5	9	2	13	7	+6	24	Advance to round of 16

Source: AFA

====== Results by round ======
Round	1	2	3	4	5	6	7	8	9	10	11	12	13	14	15	16
Ground	A	H	A	H	A	H	A	H	H	A	H	A	H	A	H	H
Result	D	W	D	W	D	W	W	L	W	D	D	D	D	W	W	W
Position	8	6	6	4	5	4	3	4	3	3	3	4	4	4	3	2

Updated to match(es) played on 4 May 2025. Source:
A = Away; H = Home; W = Win; D = Draw; L = Loss

====== Matches ======
25 January 2025 1	Platense	1–1	River Plate	Vicente López Partido
21:30 ART (UTC−3)	Vázquez 12'; Picco (yellow card) 38'	Report	Rojas 87'; Meza (yellow card) 90'	Stadium: Estadio Ciudad de Vicente López; Referee: Ariel Penel

29 January 2025 2	River Plate	1–0	Instituto	Buenos Aires
21:30 ART (UTC−3)	Pezzella (yellow card) 5'; Martínez Quarta (yellow card) 19'; Pérez (yellow card) 61'; Díaz (yellow card) 70'; Montiel 90'	Report	Franco (yellow card) 45+6'	Stadium: Estadio Monumental; Referee: Yael Falcón Pérez

2 February 2025 3	San Lorenzo	0–0	River Plate	Buenos Aires
17:00 ART (UTC−3)	Cerutti (yellow card) 9'; Romaña (yellow card) 63'; Ladstatter (yellow card) 90+1'	Report	Driussi (yellow card) 29'; Martínez Quarta (yellow card) 61'; Acuña (yellow card) 63'; Borja (yellow card) 84'; Montiel (yellow card) 90+3'	Stadium: Estadio Pedro Bidegain; Referee: Darío Herrera

8 February 2025 4	River Plate	2–0	Independiente	Buenos Aires
20:15 ART (UTC−3)	Colidio 51', 90+2'; Driussi (yellow card) 73'; Martínez Quarta (yellow card) 82'	Report	Vera (yellow card) 37'; Marcone (yellow card) 65'	Stadium: Estadio Monumental; Referee: Leandro Rey Hilfer

12 February 2025 5	Godoy Cruz	0–0	River Plate	Godoy Cruz
22:15 ART (UTC−3)	Poggi (yellow card) 54'; Leyes (yellow card) 68'; Rasmussen (yellow card) 70'; Abrego (yellow card) 84'; Mendoza (yellow card) 90+4'	Report	Bustos (yellow card) 25'; Colidio (yellow card) 90+3'	Stadium: Estadio Feliciano Gambarte; Referee: Pablo Echavarría

16 February 2025 6	River Plate	1–0	Lanús	Buenos Aires
19:15 ART (UTC−3)	Pérez (yellow card) 49'; Borja (yellow card) 58' (goal) 77'; Galoppo (yellow card) 75'; Tapia (yellow card) 90+4'	Report	Cardozo (yellow card) 45+3'; Dejesús (yellow card) 69'	Stadium: Estadio Monumental; Referee: Facundo Tello

22 February 2025 7	San Martín (SJ)	0–2	River Plate	San Juan
21:30 ART (UTC−3)		Report	Borja 56'; Mastantuono 69'; Pérez (yellow card) 75'; Martínez Quarta (yellow card) 84'	Stadium: Estadio Ingeniero Hilario Sánchez; Referee: Carlos Gariano

1 March 2025 8	River Plate	0–2	Estudiantes (LP)	Buenos Aires
19:15 ART (UTC−3)	Meza (yellow card) 27'; Acuña (yellow card) 40'; Pérez (red card) 56'; Subiabre (yellow card) 90+7'	Report	Ascacíbar (yellow card) 1' (goal) 90+4'; Piovi (yellow card) 7'; Castro 9'; Núñez (yellow card) 44'; Arzamendia (yellow card) 61'; Neves (yellow card) 69'; Benedetti (yellow card) 90'; Burgos (yellow card) 90+6'	Stadium: Estadio Monumental; Referee: Yael Falcón Pérez

9 March 2025 9	River Plate	1–0	Atlético Tucumán	Buenos Aires
19:15 ART (UTC−3)	Colidio 79'; Kranevitter (yellow card) 85'; Simón (red card) 90+3'	Report	Sánchez (yellow card) 17'; Infante (yellow card) 61'; Díaz (yellow card) 85'	Stadium: Estadio Monumental; Referee: Leandro Rey Hilfer

15 March 2025 10	Deportivo Riestra	0–0	River Plate	Buenos Aires
16:00 ART (UTC−3)	Miño (yellow card) 18'; Ramírez (yellow card) 21'; Gallo (yellow card) 31'; Goitía (yellow card) 65'; Benegas (yellow card) 69'	Report	Aliendro (yellow card) 41'	Stadium: Estadio Guillermo Laza; Referee: Fernando Echenique

29 March 2025 11	River Plate	2–2	Rosario Central	Buenos Aires
21:00 ART (UTC−3)	Martínez Quarta 18'; Aliendro (yellow card) 44'; Subiabre 61'; Meza (yellow card) 77'	Report	Ferreira 8'; Ibarra (yellow card) 37'; Campaz (yellow card) 45+2'; López 85'	Stadium: Estadio Monumental; Referee: Yael Falcón Pérez

5 April 2025 12	Sarmiento (J)	1–1	River Plate	Junín
21:30 ART (UTC−3)	Villalba (yellow card) 16'; Insaurralde 44'; Orihuela (yellow card) 72'	Report	González (yellow card) 14'; Borja 30'; Castaño (yellow card) 69'; Colidio (yellow card) 79'	Stadium: Estadio Eva Perón; Referee: Darío Herrera

13 April 2025 13	River Plate	1–1	Talleres (C)	Buenos Aires
21:15 ART (UTC−3)	Pezzella (yellow card) 86'; Borja 87'; Mastantuono (yellow card) 90+4'	Report	Bustos (yellow card) 34'; Depietri 50'; Galarza (yellow card) 86'	Stadium: Estadio Monumental; Referee: Nazareno Arasa

18 April 2025 14	Gimnasia y Esgrima (LP)	0–3	River Plate	La Plata
18:00 ART (UTC−3)	Hurtado (yellow card) 27'; Di Biasi (yellow card) 48'; Piedrahita (yellow card) 85'	Report	Castaño (yellow card) 5'; Pezzella (yellow card) 9'; Driussi 35'; Mastantuono 54' (yellow card) 59'; Acuña (yellow card) 56'; Fernández (yellow card) 66'; Aliendro 82'	Stadium: Estadio Juan Carmelo Zerillo; Referee: Leandro Rey Hilfer

27 April 2025 15	River Plate	2–1	Boca Juniors	Buenos Aires
16:30 ART (UTC−3)	Mastantuono 26' (yellow card) 90+2'; Driussi 45'; Borja (yellow card) 45+1'; Acuña (yellow card) 45+1'; Meza (yellow card) 55'; Martínez Quarta (yellow card) 74'; Castaño (yellow card) 90+4'	Report	Belmonte (yellow card) 12'; Costa (yellow card) 19'; Rojo (yellow card) 23'; Merentiel 39'; Advíncula (yellow card) 62'; Battaglia (yellow card) 85'	Stadium: Estadio Monumental; Referee: Nicolás Ramírez

4 May 2025 16	River Plate	4–1	Vélez Sarsfield	Buenos Aires
21:30 ART (UTC−3)	Driussi 14'; Colidio 28'; González (yellow card) 30'; Fernández 33'; Galoppo (yellow card) 59'; Castaño (yellow card) 90+1'; Borja 90+10' (pen.)	Report	Silvero (yellow card) 32'; Carrizo 37'; Vázquez (yellow card) 43'; Baeza (yellow card) 78'; Gómez (yellow card) 90+5' (red card) 90+5'	Stadium: Estadio Monumental; Referee: Andrés Merlos

===== Final stages =====
12 May 2025 Round of 16	River Plate	3–0	Barracas Central	Buenos Aires
21:30 ART (UTC−3)	Díaz 12'; Pérez (yellow card) 33'; Fernández 43'; Mastantuono (yellow card) 69'; Acuña (yellow card) 88'	Report	Mater (yellow card) 35'	Stadium: Estadio Monumental; Referee: Sebastián Zunino

20 May 2025 Quarter-finals	River Plate	1–1 (2–4 p)	Platense	Buenos Aires
20:30 ART (UTC−3)	Acuña (yellow card) 24'; Martínez Quarta (yellow card) 55'; Mastantuono 90+12' (pen.)	Report	Taborda 29'; Silva (yellow card) 31'; Martínez (yellow card) 32'; Cozzani (yellow card) 55'; Schor (yellow card) 82'; Vázquez (yellow card) 90+10'; Salomón (yellow card) 90+11'	Stadium: Estadio Monumental; Referee: Yael Falcón Pérez
	Penalties
	Mastantuono (penalty scored); Borja (penalty scored); Castaño (penalty missed); Driussi (penalty missed)		(penalty scored) Vázquez; (penalty missed) Saborido; (penalty scored) Mainero; (penalty scored) Zapiola; (penalty scored) Schor

==== Torneo Clausura ====
===== Group stage =====
====== League table ======
Pos	Team	Pld	W	D	L	GF	GA	GD	Pts	Qualification
4	Vélez Sarsfield	16	7	5	4	19	12	+7	26	Advance to round of 16
5	San Lorenzo	16	6	6	4	13	11	+2	24	Advance to round of 16
6	River Plate	16	6	4	6	20	15	+5	22	Advance to round of 16
7	Gimnasia y Esgrima (LP)	16	7	1	8	14	16	−2	22	Advance to round of 16
8	Talleres (C)	16	5	6	5	9	12	−3	21	Advance to round of 16

Source: AFA

====== Results by round ======
Round	1	2	3	4	5	6	7	8	9	10	11	12	13	14	15	16
Ground	H	A	H	A	H	A	H	A	A	H	A	H	A	H	A	A
Result	W	W	D	D	W	D	W	W	L	L	L	L	W	L	L	D
Position	1	1	1	1	1	1	1	1	2	3	4	5	5	6	6	6

Updated to match(es) played on 16 November 2025. Source:
A = Away; H = Home; W = Win; D = Draw; L = Loss

====== Matches ======
13 July 2025 1	River Plate	3–1	Platense	Buenos Aires
21:00 ART (UTC−3)	Colidio 7' (yellow card) 52'; Díaz (yellow card) 38'; Salas 39'; Subiabre (yellow card) 56'; Borja 90+1'	Report	Mainero (yellow card) 12'; Martínez 24'; Portillo (yellow card) 58' (red card) 75'; Vázquez (yellow card) 70'	Stadium: Estadio Monumental; Referee: Leandro Rey Hilfer

19 July 2025 2	Instituto	0–4	River Plate	Córdoba
21:00 ART (UTC−3)	Alarcón (yellow card) 51'; Mac Allister (red card) 73'; Franco (yellow card) 88'	Report	Lencina (yellow card) 27' (goal) 45+2', 67'; Colidio 44'; Montiel (yellow card) 45+1'; Acuña (yellow card) 51'; Martínez Quarta (yellow card) 53'; Galoppo 89'	Stadium: Estadio Monumental Presidente Perón; Referee: Luis Lobo Medina

27 July 2025 3	River Plate	0–0	San Lorenzo	Buenos Aires
20:30 ART (UTC−3)	Borja (yellow card) 20'; Galarza (yellow card) 26'; Martínez Quarta (yellow card) 59'; Martínez (yellow card) 84'; Díaz (yellow card) 90+4'	Report	E.Herrera (yellow card) 16'; Gill (yellow card) 90'	Stadium: Estadio Monumental; Referee: Nicolás Ramírez

9 August 2025 4	Independiente	0–0	River Plate	Avellaneda
18:30 ART (UTC−3)	Zabala (yellow card) 23'; Lomónaco (yellow card) 26'; Loyola (yellow card) 61'; Godoy (yellow card) 88'; Fernández (yellow card) 90+9'	Report	Galarza (yellow card) 5'; Rivero (yellow card) 78'	Stadium: Estadio Libertadores de América; Referee: Nazareno Arasa

17 August 2025 5	River Plate	4–2	Godoy Cruz	Buenos Aires
19:30 ART (UTC−3)	Driussi 4', 49'; Galoppo 19', 45+5'; Acuña (yellow card) 43'; Casco (yellow card) 57'; Galarza (yellow card) 65'	Report	Auzmendi 9', 29' (pen.); Morán (yellow card) 13'; P.Fernández (yellow card) 52'; Mendoza (yellow card) 78'	Stadium: Estadio Monumental; Referee: Sebastián Zunino

25 August 2025 6	Lanús	1–1	River Plate	Lanús
21:15 ART (UTC−3)	Medina (yellow card) 66'; Castillo 90+5'	Report	Montiel 77'; Salas (yellow card) 90'	Stadium: Estadio Lanús; Referee: Leandro Rey Hilfer

31 August 2025 7	River Plate	2–0	San Martín (SJ)	Buenos Aires
20:15 ART (UTC−3)	Lencina 17' (yellow card) 45+2'; Salas 21'; Portillo (yellow card) 72'; Castaño (yellow card) 78'; Martínez Quarta (yellow card) 81'	Report	Recalde (yellow card) 50'; Watson (yellow card) 74'	Stadium: Estadio Monumental; Referee: Darío Herrera

13 September 2025 8	Estudiantes (LP)	1–2	River Plate	La Plata
19:00 ART (UTC−3)	Ascacíbar (yellow card) 44'; Medina (yellow card) 67'; Núñez 90+1'; Carrillo (yellow card) 90+2'	Report	Galoppo 6'; Fernández 13'; Martínez Quarta (red card) 37'; Salas (yellow card) 44'; Rivero (yellow card) 58'; Acuña (yellow card) 67'; Armani (yellow card) 90+3'; Castaño (yellow card) 90+4'; Colidio (yellow card) 90+5'	Stadium: Estadio Jorge Luis Hirschi; Referee: Nicolás Ramírez

20 September 2025 9	Atlético Tucumán	2–0	River Plate	San Miguel de Tucumán
21:15 ART (UTC−3)	Ferreira 12'; Mansilla (yellow card) 39'; Díaz 68' (pen.)	Report		Stadium: Estadio Monumental José Fierro; Referee: Facundo Tello

28 September 2025 10	River Plate	1–2	Deportivo Riestra	Buenos Aires
18:00 ART (UTC−3)	Galoppo 25'; Salas (red card) 81'	Report	Barbieri (yellow card) 7'; Alonso 12'; P.Ramírez 51'; Benegas (yellow card) 66'; Sansotre (yellow card) 84'	Stadium: Estadio Monumental; Referee: Pablo Echavarría

5 October 2025 11	Rosario Central	2–1	River Plate	Rosario
21:15 ART (UTC−3)	Coronel (yellow card) 16'; Ibarra 21'; Mallo (yellow card) 50'; Malcorra 59'	Report	Borja 10' (yellow card) 77'; Rivero (yellow card) 13'; Montiel (yellow card) 26'; Portillo (yellow card) 34' (yellow-red card) 39'; Acuña (yellow card) 38'; Armani (yellow card) 39'; Castaño (yellow card) 74'	Stadium: Estadio Gigante de Arroyito; Referee: Yael Falcón Pérez

12 October 2025 12	River Plate	0–1	Sarmiento	Buenos Aires
19:15 ART (UTC−3)	Galoppo (yellow card) 28'; Díaz (yellow card) 75'	Report	I.Morales 30' (yellow card) 67'; Insaurralde (yellow card) 36'; Pratto (yellow card) 45+2'; Contrera (yellow card) 45+4'; Godoy (yellow card) 48'	Stadium: Estadio Monumental; Referee: Sebastián Zunino

18 October 2025 13	Talleres (C)	0–2	River Plate	Córdoba
22:15 ART (UTC−3)	Girotti (yellow card) 42'; Bustos (yellow card) 81'	Report	Rivero (yellow card) 21'; Montiel 37'; Casco (yellow card) 40'; Martínez Quarta (yellow card) 42'; Meza 68'	Stadium: Estadio Mario Alberto Kempes; Referee: Ariel Penel

2 November 2025 14	River Plate	0–1	Gimnasia y Esgrima	Buenos Aires
20:30 ART (UTC−3)	Jaime (yellow card) 24'; Bustos (yellow card) 90+5'; Borja (penalty missed) 90+16'	Report	M.Torres 55' (pen.); Suso (yellow card) 90+10'; Schelotto (yellow card) 90+11'; Giampaoli (yellow card) 90+15'	Stadium: Estadio Monumental; Referee: Nazareno Arasa

9 November 2025 15	Boca Juniors	2–0	River Plate	Buenos Aires
16:30 ART (UTC−3)	Di Lollo (yellow card) 38'; Zeballos 45'; Merentiel 46'; Blanco (yellow card) 78'; Giménez (yellow card) 84'	Report	Martínez Quarta (yellow card) 13'; Acuña (yellow card) 45+3'; Armani (yellow card) 51'; Montiel (yellow card) 63'; Borja (yellow card) 69'; Galarza (yellow card) 71'; Galoppo (yellow card) 73'	Stadium: La Bombonera; Referee: Nicolás Ramírez

16 November 2025 16	Vélez Sarsfield	0–0	River Plate	Buenos Aires
17:00 ART (UTC−3)	Bouzat (yellow card) 71'	Report	Obregón (yellow card) 26'; Casco (yellow card) 76'; Subiabre (yellow card) 90'	Stadium: José Amalfitani Stadium; Referee: Leandro Rey Hilfer

===== Final stages =====
24 November 2025 Round of 16	Racing Club	3–2	River Plate	Avellaneda
19:15 ART (UTC−3)	Solari 4'; Martínez (yellow card) 31'; Martínez Quarta 73' (o.g.); Martirena 90+3' (yellow card) 90+5'	Report	Fernández (yellow card) 40'; Rivero (yellow card) 55'; Subiabre 62'; Quintero 64'	Stadium: El Cilindro; Referee: Facundo Tello

=== Copa Argentina ===
22 March 2025 Round of 64	River Plate	2–0	Ciudad de Bolivar	Santiago del Estero
21:15 ART (UTC−3)	González Pírez 3'; Mastantuono 35'; Borja (penalty missed) 53'; Lencinas (yellow card) 79'	Report	Martínez (yellow card) 21'; Caraballo (yellow card) 29'; Paredes (yellow card) 48'	Stadium: Único Madre de Ciudades; Referee: Sebastián Martínez

2 August 2025 Round of 32	San Martín (T)	0–3	River Plate	Santiago del Estero
21:10 ART (UTC−3)	Gu.Rodríguez (yellow card) 3'; M.García (yellow card) 35'; Murillo (yellow card) 77'	Report	Montiel 33', 83'; Pezzella (yellow card) 49'; Borja (yellow card) 55'; Galarza (yellow card) 57'; Galoppo 71'	Stadium: Estadio Único Madre de Ciudades; Referee: Facundo Tello

28 August 2025 Round of 16	Unión	0–0 (3–4 p)	River Plate	Mendoza
21:15 ART (UTC−3)		Report		Stadium: Estadio Malvinas Argentinas; Referee: Andrés Gariano
	Penalties
	Martínez (penalty scored); Pittón (penalty scored); Gamba (penalty missed); Fascendini (penalty missed); Colazo (penalty scored)		(penalty scored) Quintero; (penalty scored) Borja; (penalty scored) Colidio; (penalty missed) Martínez Quarta; (penalty scored) Montiel

2 October 2025 Quarterfinal	Racing	0–1	River Plate	Rosario
18:00 ART (UTC−3)	Almendra (yellow card) 16'; Martínez (yellow card) 45' (yellow-red card) 90+1'; Solari (yellow card) 57'; Balboa (yellow card) 90+9'; Rojas (yellow card) 90+12'	Report	Salas 5'; Montiel (yellow card) 50'; Portillo (yellow card) 78'; Acuña (yellow card) 90+9'; Castaño (yellow card) 90+12'	Stadium: Gigante de Arroyito; Referee: Hernán Mastrángelo

24 October 2025 Semifinal	Independiente Rivadavia	0–0 (4–3 p)	River Plate	Córdoba
22:10 ART (UTC−3)	Studer (yellow card) 45+1'; Bucca (yellow card) 90+2'; Bottari (yellow card) 90+5'	Report	Jaime (yellow card) 63'	Stadium: Estadio Mario Alberto Kempes; Referee: Carlos Gariano
	Penalties
	Gómez (penalty scored); Costa (penalty missed); Sartori (penalty scored); Studer (penalty scored); Villa (penalty scored)		(penalty missed) Borja; (penalty missed) Galoppo; (penalty scored) Colidio; (penalty scored) Meza; (penalty scored) Montiel

=== Supercopa Internacional ===
5 March 2025	River Plate	0–0 (a.e.t.) (2–3 p)	Talleres (C)	Asunción, Paraguay
20:00 ART (UTC−3)		Report		Stadium: Estadio General Pablo Rojas; Referee: Maximiliano Nicolás Ramírez
	Penalties
	Rojas (penalty missed); Martínez (penalty scored); Borja (penalty scored); Montiel (penalty missed); Colidio (penalty missed); Lanzini (penalty missed)		(penalty missed) Reynoso; (penalty scored) Mosqueira; (penalty missed) Tarragona; (penalty missed) Ortegoza; (penalty scored) Bustos; (penalty scored) Benavídez

=== Copa Libertadores ===
==== Group stage ====
Pos	Team	Pld	W	D	L	GF	GA	GD	Pts	Qualification
1	(Argentina) River Plate	6	3	3	0	13	7	+6	12	Advance to round of 16
2	(Peru) Universitario	6	2	2	2	4	4	0	8	Advance to round of 16
3	(Ecuador) Independiente del Valle	6	2	2	2	8	11	−3	8	Transfer to Copa Sudamericana
4	(Ecuador) Barcelona	6	1	1	4	4	7	−3	4	

Source: CONMEBOL

2 April 2025 1	Universitario (Peru)	0–1	(Argentina) River Plate	Lima, Peru
21:30 ART (UTC−3)	Concha (yellow card) 36'; Corzo (yellow card) 49'; Valera (yellow card) 55'; Murrugarra (yellow card) 62'; Vélez (yellow card) 72'; Flores (yellow card) 83'	Report	Díaz 17'; Pérez (yellow card) 23'; Castaño (yellow card) 63'; Bustos (yellow card) 74'; Armani (yellow card) 90+5'	Stadium: Estadio Monumental; Attendance: 56,858; Referee: Gustavo Tejera (Uruguay)

8 April 2025 2	River Plate (Argentina)	0–0	(Ecuador) Barcelona	Buenos Aires, Argentina
21:30 ART (UTC−3)	Driussi (penalty missed) 6'; Castaño (yellow card) 76'; Martínez Quarta (yellow card) 82'; Borja (yellow card) 90+1'	Report	Vallecilla (yellow card) 47'	Stadium: Estadio Monumental; Attendance: 0 Referee: Raphael Claus (Brazil)
Note: River Plate played their home match against Barcelona behind closed doors as they were punished for the use of pyrotechnics by their fans in their 2024 Copa Libertadores semi-final match against Atlético Mineiro.

23 April 2025 3	Independiente del Valle (Ecuador)	2–2	(Argentina) River Plate	Quito, Ecuador
21:30 ART (UTC−3)	Spinelli 24', 30'; Méndez (yellow card) 73'; Loor (yellow card) 78'	Report	Colidio (yellow card) 42'; Pezzella (yellow card) 60'; Galoppo 68'; Driussi 74'; Armani (yellow card) 88'; Montiel (yellow card) 90+1'; Kranevitter (yellow card) 90+5'	Stadium: Estadio Banco Guayaquil; Attendance: 6,411; Referee: Piero Maza (Chile)
Note: The Independiente del Valle v River Plate match, originally scheduled for 24 April 2025, 19:30 local time, was rescheduled to 23 April 2025 at River Plate's request.

8 May 2025 4	Barcelona (Ecuador)	2–3	(Argentina) River Plate	Guayaquil, Ecuador
21:30 ART (UTC−3)	Rivero 15'; Chalá (yellow card) 28'; Martínez Quarta 49' (o.g.); Trindade (yellow card) 73'	Report	Driussi 7'; Colidio 26'; Mastantuono 48'; Galoppo (yellow card) 82'; Montiel (yellow card) 85'	Stadium: Estadio Monumental Isidro Romero Carbo; Referee: Wilmar Roldán (Colombia)

15 May 2025 5	River Plate (Argentina)	6–2	(Ecuador) Independiente del Valle	Buenos Aires, Argentina
21:30 ART (UTC−3)	Driussi 7'; Zárate 25' (o.g.); Mastantuono 45+5' (pen.); Meza 51'; Borja 88'; Lanzini 90+4'	Report	Hoyos 11'; Spinelli 21'; Mercado (yellow card) 40'; Carabajal (red card) 45+4'; L.Loor (yellow card) 86'	Stadium: Estadio Monumental; Referee: Jesús Valenzuela (Venezuela)

27 May 2025 6	River Plate (Argentina)	1–1	(Peru) Universitario	Buenos Aires, Argentina
21:30 ART (UTC−3)	Colidio 36'	Report	Concha 45+2'	Stadium: Estadio Monumental; Referee: Raphael Claus (Brazil)

==== Knockout stage ====
14 August 2025 Round of 16 1st leg	Libertad (Paraguay)	0–0	(Argentina) River Plate	Asunción, Paraguay
21:30 ART (UTC−3)	H.Fernández (yellow card) 78'; Recalde (yellow card) 85'; Rojas (yellow card) 86'	Report		Stadium: Estadio Tigo La Huerta; Referee: Wilton Sampaio (Brazil)
Note: The Libertad v River Plate match, originally scheduled at Estadio Defensores del Chaco, Asunción was moved to Libertad's regular stadium Estadio La Huerta, Asunción.

21 August 2025 Round of 16 2nd leg	River Plate (Argentina)	1–1 (1–1 agg.) (3–1 p)	(Paraguay) Libertad	Buenos Aires, Argentia
21:30 ART (UTC−3)	Galoppo (yellow card) 20' (yellow-red card) 52'; Driussi 29'; Montiel (yellow card) 68'; Fernández (yellow card) 70'	Report	Franco (yellow card) 18'; Rojas 43'; Rojas (yellow card) 45+4'; Cardozo Lucena (yellow card) 90+1'	Stadium: Estadio Monumental; Referee: Andrés Matonte (Uruguay)
	Penalties
	I. Fernández (penalty scored); Borja (penalty scored); Acuña (penalty missed); Martínez Quarta (penalty scored)		(penalty missed) Recalde; (penalty scored) Viera; (penalty missed) Caballero; (penalty missed) M. Fernández

17 September 2025 Quarter-final 1st leg	River Plate (Argentina)	1–2	(Brazil) Palmeiras	Buenos Aires, Argentia
21:30 ART (UTC−3)	Díaz (yellow card) 18'; Acuña (yellow card) 25'; Rivero (yellow card) 38'; Montiel (yellow card) 48'; Martínez Quarta 89'	Report	Gómez 6'; Evangelista (yellow card) 17'; Moreno (yellow card) 26'; Vitor Roque 41'; Weverton (yellow card) 84'; Torres (yellow card) 88'	Stadium: Estadio Monumental; Referee: Jesús Valenzuela (Venezuela)

24 September 2025 Quarter-final 2nd leg	Palmeiras (Brazil)	3–1 (5–2 agg.)	(Argentina) River Plate	São Paulo, Brazil
21:30 ART (UTC−3)	Weverton (yellow card) 45+3'; Vitor Roque 51' (yellow card) 56'; López 90+1' (pen.), 90+4'	Report	Salas 8' (yellow card) 67'; Portillo (yellow card) 23'; Galoppo (yellow card) 45+3'; Acuña (yellow card) 55' (yellow-red card) 87'; Pérez (yellow card) 75'; Castaño (yellow card) 89'	Stadium: Allianz Parque; Attendance: 40,893; Referee: Andrés Matonte (Uruguay)

=== FIFA Club World Cup ===
==== Group stage ====
Pos	Team	Pld	W	D	L	GF	GA	GD	Pts	Qualification
1	(Italy) Inter Milan	3	2	1	0	5	2	+3	7	Advance to knockout stage
2	(Mexico) Monterrey	3	1	2	0	5	1	+4	5	Advance to knockout stage
3	(Argentina) River Plate	3	1	1	1	3	3	0	4	
4	(Japan) Urawa Red Diamonds	3	0	0	3	2	9	−7	0	

Source: FIFA

17 June 2025 1	River Plate (Argentina)	3–1	(Japan) Urawa Red Diamonds	Seattle, United States
16:00 ART (UTC−3)	Colidio 12'; Pérez (yellow card) 24'; Driussi 48'; Acuña (yellow card) 58'; Pezzella (yellow card) 59'; Meza 73'; Galoppo (yellow card) 90+2'	Report	Gustafson (yellow card) 34'; Matsuo 58' (pen.); Watanabe (yellow card) 87'	Stadium: Lumen Field; Attendance: 11,974; Referee: Felix Zwayer (Germany)

21 June 2025 2	River Plate (Argentina)	0–0	(Mexico) Monterrey	Pasadena, United States
22:00 ART (UTC−3)	Pérez (yellow card) 17'; Castaño (yellow card) 28' (yellow-red card) 90+1'; Galoppo (yellow card) 56'; Meza (yellow card) 63'	Report	Rodríguez (yellow card) 19'; Medina (yellow card) 66'; Aguirre (yellow card) 90'; Alvarado (yellow card) 90'; Ambríz (yellow card) 90+2'	Stadium: Rose Bowl; Attendance: 57,393; Referee: Slavko Vinčić (Slovenia)

25 June 2025 3	Inter Milan (Italy)	2–0	(Argentina) River Plate	Seattle, United States
22:00 ART (UTC−3)	Bastoni (yellow card) 30', (goal) 90+3'; F. Esposito 72'; Augusto (yellow card) 77'; S. Esposito (yellow card) 85'; Dumfries (yellow card) 90+4'	Report	Montiel (yellow card) 22' (yellow-red card) 90+5'; Martínez Quarta (red card) 65'; Lanzini (yellow card) 77'; Diaz (yellow card) 88'	Stadium: Lumen Field; Attendance: 45,135; Referee: Ilgiz Tantashev (Uzbekistan)

== Squad statistics ==
As of match played 24 November 2025

=== Appearances and goals ===
No.	Pos	Nat	Player	Total		Primera División		Copa Argentina		Supercopa Internacional		Copa Libertadores		FIFA Club World Cup	
No.	Pos	Nat	Player	Apps	Goals	Apps	Goals	Apps	Goals	Apps	Goals	Apps	Goals	Apps	Goals
1	GK	(Argentina) ARG	Franco Armani	51	0	33	0	4	0	1	0	10	0	3	0
2	DF	(Argentina) ARG	Federico Gattoni	1	0	0	0	1	0	0	0	0	0	0	0
4	DF	(Argentina) ARG	Gonzalo Montiel	37	5	21+1	3	4	2	1	0	6+1	0	3	0
5	MF	(Argentina) ARG	Juan Portillo	17	0	10+2	0	2+1	0	0	0	2	0	0	0
6	DF	(Argentina) ARG	Germán Pezzella	26	0	13+4	0	1	0	1	0	3+2	0	1+1	0
7	FW	(Argentina) ARG	Maximiliano Salas	18	4	12+1	2	3	1	0	0	2	1	0	0
8	MF	(Argentina) ARG	Maximiliano Meza	25	3	8+8	1	0+1	0	1	0	2+2	1	2+1	1
9	FW	(Colombia) COL	Miguel Borja	49	8	13+18	7	2+3	0	1	0	1+8	1	1+2	0
10	MF	(Colombia) COL	Juan Quintero	22	1	9+5	1	2+2	0	0	0	2+2	0	0	0
11	FW	(Argentina) ARG	Facundo Colidio	45	9	22+5	6	2+2	0	0+1	0	8+2	2	3	1
13	DF	(Argentina) ARG	Lautaro Rivero	15	0	10	0	3	0	0	0	2	0	0	0
14	DF	(Uruguay) URU	Sebastián Boselli	5	0	2+1	0	0	0	0	0	1+1	0	0	0
16	DF	(Argentina) ARG	Fabricio Bustos	23	0	14+4	0	1	0	0	0	4	0	0	0
17	DF	(Chile) CHI	Paulo Díaz	30	2	18+2	1	1	0	0+1	0	6	1	2	0
18	MF	(Argentina) ARG	Pity Martínez	13	0	3+6	0	0+1	0	0+1	0	0	0	0+2	0
19	FW	(Argentina) ARG	Sebastián Driussi	36	10	17+6	5	2	0	1	0	8+1	4	1	1
20	DF	(Argentina) ARG	Milton Casco	21	0	10+6	0	1	0	1	0	2	0	0+1	0
21	DF	(Argentina) ARG	Marcos Acuña	41	1	24+2	1	4	0	0	0	8	0	3	0
22	MF	(Colombia) COL	Kevin Castaño	38	0	19+3	0	4	0	0	0	9+1	0	2	0
23	MF	(Paraguay) PAR	Matías Galarza	14	0	4+6	0	1+1	0	0	0	1+1	0	0	0
24	MF	(Argentina) ARG	Enzo Pérez	38	0	22+2	0	2	0	1	0	7+2	0	2	0
25	GK	(Argentina) ARG	Conan Ledesma	3	0	2	0	1	0	0	0	0	0	0	0
26	MF	(Argentina) ARG	Ignacio Fernández	32	3	8+9	3	3+1	0	0	0	6+2	0	1+2	0
27	FW	(Argentina) ARG	Bautista Dadín	4	0	1+3	0	0	0	0	0	0	0	0	0
28	DF	(Argentina) ARG	Lucas Martínez Quarta	40	2	25	1	3	0	1	0	7+1	1	3	0
30	FW	(Argentina) ARG	Cristian Jaime	3	0	0+2	0	0+1	0	0	0	0	0	0	0
31	MF	(Argentina) ARG	Santiago Simón	16	0	5+6	0	0+1	0	1	0	1+2	0	0	0
33	MF	(Argentina) ARG	Agustín De La Cuesta	1	0	1	0	0	0	0	0	0	0	0	0
34	MF	(Argentina) ARG	Giuliano Galoppo	34	7	17+6	5	2+2	1	0	0	3+2	1	1+1	0
35	MF	(Brazil) BRA	Giorgio Costantini	3	0	0+2	0	0	0	0	0	0	0	0+1	0
36	DF	(Argentina) ARG	Ulises Giménez	1	0	0	0	0+1	0	0	0	0	0	0	0
37	MF	(Argentina) ARG	Thiago Acosta	4	0	2+2	0	0	0	0	0	0	0	0	0
38	FW	(Argentina) ARG	Ian Subiabre	18	2	4+9	2	0+1	0	0	0	0+4	0	0	0
39	MF	(Argentina) ARG	Santiago Lencina	21	3	9+5	3	1+3	0	0	0	1+2	0	0	0
40	MF	(Argentina) ARG	Agustín Obregón	1	0	0+1	0	0	0	0	0	0	0	0	0
44	FW	(Argentina) ARG	Joaquin Freitas	1	0	0+1	0	0	0	0	0	0	0	0	0
47	MF	(Argentina) ARG	Juan Meza	8	0	2+6	0	0	0	0	0	0	0	0	0
Players away on loan:
19	FW	(Chile) CHI	Gonzalo Tapia	7	0	1+5	0	1	0	0	0	0	0	0	0
Players who left River Plate during the season:
5	MF	(Argentina) ARG	Matías Kranevitter	9	0	2+2	0	1	0	0+1	0	0+1	0	1+1	0
7	MF	(Paraguay) PAR	Matías Rojas	8	1	0+5	1	0	0	0+1	0	0+2	0	0	0
10	MF	(Argentina) ARG	Manuel Lanzini	15	1	4+6	0	0	0	0+1	0	0+3	1	0+1	0
14	DF	(Argentina) ARG	Leandro González Pírez	4	1	2	0	1	1	0	0	1	0	0	0
29	MF	(Argentina) ARG	Rodrigo Aliendro	16	1	5+7	1	1	0	0	0	1+1	0	1	0
30	FW	(Argentina) ARG	Franco Mastantuono	23	7	11+1	4	1	1	1	0	6	2	3	0
36	FW	(Argentina) ARG	Pablo Solari	1	0	0+1	0	0	0	0	0	0	0	0	0

=== Goal scorers ===
Place	Position	Nation	Number	Name	Primera División	Copa Argentina	Supercopa Internacional	Copa Libertadores	FIFA Club World Cup	Total
1	FW	(Argentina)	15	Sebastián Driussi	5	0	0	4	1	10
2	FW	(Argentina)	11	Facundo Colidio	6	0	0	2	1	9
3	FW	(Colombia)	9	Miguel Borja	7	0	0	1	0	8
4	MF	(Argentina)	34	Giuliano Galoppo	5	1	0	1	0	7
4	FW	(Argentina)	30	Franco Mastantuono	4	1	0	2	0	7
6	DF	(Argentina)	4	Gonzalo Montiel	3	2	0	0	0	5
7	FW	(Argentina)	7	Maximiliano Salas	2	1	0	1	0	4
8	MF	(Argentina)	39	Santiago Lencina	3	0	0	0	0	3
8	MF	(Argentina)	26	Ignacio Fernández	3	0	0	0	0	3
8	MF	(Argentina)	8	Maximiliano Meza	1	0	0	1	1	3
11	FW	(Argentina)	38	Ian Subiabre	2	0	0	0	0	2
11	DF	(Chile)	17	Paulo Díaz	1	0	0	1	0	2
11	DF	(Argentina)	28	Lucas Martínez Quarta	1	0	0	1	0	2
14	MF	(Paraguay)	7	Matías Rojas	1	0	0	0	0	1
14	MF	(Argentina)	29	Rodrigo Aliendro	1	0	0	0	0	1
14	DF	(Argentina)	21	Marcos Acuña	1	0	0	0	0	1
14	MF	(Colombia)	10	Juan Quintero	1	0	0	0	0	1
14	DF	(Argentina)	14	Leandro González Pírez	0	1	0	0	0	1
14	MF	(Argentina)	10	Manuel Lanzini	0	0	0	1	0	1
14				Own goal	0	0	0	1	0	1
				TOTALS	47	6	0	16	3	72

=== Clean sheets ===
Place	Position	Nation	Number	Name	Primera División	Copa Argentina	Supercopa Internacional	Copa Libertadores	FIFA Club World Cup	Total
1	GK	(Argentina)	1	Franco Armani	16	4	1	3	1	25
2	GK	(Argentina)	25	Conan Ledesma	0	1	0	0	0	1
				TOTALS	16	5	1	3	1	26

=== Disciplinary record ===
Number	Nation	Position	Name	Primera División		Copa Argentina		Supercopa Internacional		Copa Libertadores		FIFA Club World Cup		Total	
Number	Nation	Position	Name	Booked	Sent off (straight red)	Booked	Sent off (straight red)	Booked	Sent off (straight red)	Booked	Sent off (straight red)	Booked	Sent off (straight red)	Booked	Sent off (straight red)
1	(Argentina)	GK	Franco Armani	2	0	0	0	0	0	2	0	0	0	4	0
4	(Argentina)	DF	Gonzalo Montiel	3	0	1	0	0	0	4	0	2	1	10	1
5	(Argentina)	MF	Juan Portillo	1	0	1	0	0	0	1	0	0	0	3	0
6	(Argentina)	DF	Germán Pezzella	3	0	1	0	1	0	1	0	1	0	8	0
7	(Argentina)	FW	Maximiliano Salas	2	1	0	0	0	0	1	0	0	0	3	1
8	(Argentina)	MF	Maximiliano Meza	4	0	0	0	0	0	0	0	1	0	5	0
9	(Colombia)	FW	Miguel Borja	5	0	1	0	1	0	1	0	0	0	8	0
11	(Argentina)	FW	Facundo Colidio	4	0	0	0	0	0	1	0	0	0	5	0
13	(Argentina)	DF	Lautaro Rivero	4	0	0	0	0	0	1	0	0	0	5	0
15	(Argentina)	FW	Sebastián Driussi	2	0	0	0	0	0	0	0	0	0	2	0
16	(Argentina)	DF	Fabricio Bustos	2	0	0	0	0	0	1	0	0	0	3	0
17	(Chile)	DF	Paulo Díaz	4	0	0	0	0	0	1	0	1	0	6	0
18	(Argentina)	MF	Pity Martínez	1	0	0	0	0	0	0	0	0	0	1	0
20	(Argentina)	DF	Milton Casco	3	0	0	0	0	0	0	0	0	0	3	0
21	(Argentina)	DF	Marcos Acuña	9	0	1	0	0	0	3	1	1	0	14	1
22	(Colombia)	MF	Kevin Castaño	6	0	1	0	0	0	3	0	2	1	12	1
23	(Paraguay)	MF	Matías Galarza	4	0	1	0	0	0	0	0	0	0	5	0
24	(Argentina)	MF	Enzo Pérez	4	1	0	0	1	0	2	0	2	0	8	1
26	(Argentina)	MF	Ignacio Fernández	2	0	0	0	0	0	1	0	0	0	3	0
28	(Argentina)	DF	Lucas Martínez Quarta	13	1	0	0	0	0	1	0	0	1	14	2
30	(Argentina)	FW	Cristian Jaime	1	0	1	0	0	0	0	0	0	0	2	0
31	(Argentina)	MF	Santiago Simón	0	1	0	0	1	0	0	0	0	0	1	1
34	(Argentina)	MF	Giuliano Galoppo	4	0	0	0	0	0	4	1	2	0	10	1
38	(Argentina)	FW	Ian Subiabre	3	0	0	0	0	0	0	0	0	0	3	0
39	(Argentina)	MF	Santiago Lencina	2	0	1	0	0	0	0	0	0	0	3	0
40	(Argentina)	MF	Agustín Obregón	1	0	0	0	0	0	0	0	0	0	1	0
Players away on loan:
19	(Chile)	FW	Gonzalo Tapia	1	0	0	0	0	0	0	0	0	0	1	0
Players who left River Plate during the season:
5	(Argentina)	MF	Matías Kranevitter	1	0	0	0	0	0	1	0	0	0	2	0
10	(Argentina)	MF	Manuel Lanzini	0	0	0	0	0	0	0	0	1	0	1	0
14	(Argentina)	DF	Leandro González Pírez	2	0	0	0	0	0	0	0	0	0	1	0
29	(Argentina)	MF	Rodrigo Aliendro	2	0	0	0	0	0	0	0	0	0	2	0
30	(Argentina)	FW	Franco Mastantuono	4	0	0	0	0	0	0	0	0	0	4	0
			TOTALS	100	4	8	0	4	0	29	2	13	3	154	9
