= 2024 Club Atlético River Plate season =

River Plate
2024 season
- Manager: Martín Demichelis (until 29 July); Marcelo Gallardo (from 5 August)
- Stadium: Estadio Monumental
- Primera División: 6th
- Copa Argentina: Round of 32
- Copa de la Liga Profesional: Quarter-finals
- Copa Libertadores: Semi-finals
- Supercopa Argentina: Winners
- Top goalscorer: League: Miguel Borja (9); All: Miguel Borja (28)
- Average home league attendance: 83,820
- Biggest win: River 5–0 Vélez Sarfield
- Biggest defeat: Atlético Mineiro 3–0 River

The 2024 season is the 123rd season of Club Atlético River Plate and their 13th consecutive season in the Primera División. In addition to their domestic league, River Plate competes in the Copa Argentina and Copa Libertadores.

== Squad ==
As of 11 July 2024

Note: Flags indicate national team as defined under FIFA eligibility rules; some limited exceptions apply. Players may hold more than one non-FIFA nationality.

No.	Pos.	Nation	Player
1	GK	ARG	Franco Armani (captain)
2	DF	URU	Sebastián Boselli
3	DF	ARG	Ramiro Funes Mori
4	MF	URU	Nicolás Fonseca
5	MF	ARG	Matías Kranevitter
6	DF	ARG	Federico Gattoni (on loan from Sevilla)
7	FW	PAR	Adam Bareiro
9	FW	COL	Miguel Borja
10	MF	ARG	Manuel Lanzini
11	FW	ARG	Facundo Colidio
13	DF	ARG	Enzo Díaz
14	DF	ARG	Leandro González Pírez
16	DF	ARG	Franco Carboni (on loan from Inter Milan)
17	DF	CHI	Paulo Díaz
18	MF	ARG	Pity Martínez
19	MF	ARG	Claudio Echeverri (on loan from Manchester City)

No.	Pos.	Nation	Player
20	DF	ARG	Milton Casco (third-captain)
22	DF	ARG	Daniel Zabala
23	MF	ARG	Rodrigo Villagra
25	GK	ARG	Conan Ledesma
26	MF	ARG	Ignacio Fernández (vice-captain)
27	DF	URU	Agustín Sant'Anna
28	MF	ARG	Felipe Peña Biafore
29	MF	ARG	Rodrigo Aliendro
30	MF	ARG	Franco Mastantuono
31	MF	ARG	Santiago Simón
32	FW	ARG	Agustín Ruberto
36	FW	ARG	Pablo Solari
37	GK	ARG	Lucas Lavagnino
38	FW	ARG	Ian Subiabre
41	GK	ARG	Santiago Beltrán

=== Players under Contract ===
Note: Flags indicate national team as defined under FIFA eligibility rules; some limited exceptions apply. Players may hold more than one non-FIFA nationality.

No.	Pos.	Nation	Player
—	GK	ARG	Augusto Batalla
—	MF	ARG	Enzo Pérez

=== Out on loan ===
Note: Flags indicate national team as defined under FIFA eligibility rules; some limited exceptions apply. Players may hold more than one non-FIFA nationality.

No.	Pos.	Nation	Player
—	GK	ARG	Ezequiel Centurión (at Independiente Rivadavia until 31 December 2025)
—	DF	PAR	David Martínez (at Inter Miami until 31 July 2025)
—	DF	ARG	Marcelo Herrera (at Columbus Crew until 31 July 2025)
—	DF	ARG	Ulises Giménez (at Defensa y Justicia until 31 December 2024)
—	DF	ARG	Manuel Guillén (at Godoy Cruz until 31 December 2024)
—	DF	ARG	Franco Paredes (at Sarmiento until 31 December 2024)
—	DF	PAR	Robert Rojas (at Vasco da Gama until 31 December 2024)
—	MF	ARG	Agustín Palavecino (at Necaxa until 31 July 2025)

No.	Pos.	Nation	Player
—	MF	ARG	José Paradela (at Necaxa until 31 December 2024)
—	MF	ARG	Franco Alfonso (at Huracán until 31 December 2024)
—	MF	ARG	Esteban Fernández (at Newell's Old Boys until 31 December 2024)
—	MF	ARG	Tomás Castro Ponce (at Atlético Tucumán until 31 December 2024)
—	MF	ARG	Tomás Galván (at Tigre until 31 December 2024)
—	MF	ARG	Cristian Ferreira (at San Lorenzo until 31 December 2024)
—	FW	COL	Flabián Londoño (at Patriotas until 31 December 2025)

== Transfers ==
=== In ===
Pos.	Player	Transferred from	Fee	Date	Source
DF	(Argentina) Federico Gattoni	(Spain) Sevilla	Loan	3 July 2024	
MF	(Argentina) Franco Carboni	(Italy) Inter Milan	Loan	12 July 2024	
DF	(Argentina) Germán Pezzella	(Spain) Real Betis	€4,500,000	5 August 2024	
DF	(Argentina) Fabricio Bustos	(Brazil) Internacional	Undisclosed	9 August 2024	
MF	(Argentina) Maximiliano Meza	(Mexico) Monterrey	€2,300,000	15 August 2024	
DF	(Argentina) Marcos Acuña	(Spain) Sevilla	€1,000,000	20 August 2024	
MF	(Argentina) Enzo Pérez	(Argentina) Estudiantes	Free	3 January 2025	

=== Out ===
Pos.	Player	Transferred to	Fee	Date	Source
MF	(Argentina) Franco Carboni	(Italy) Inter Milan	Loan return	23 August 2024	
DF	(Uruguay) Sebastián Boselli	(Argentina) Estudiantes de La Plata	Loan	29 August 2024	

== Competitions ==
=== Overall record ===
Competition	First match	Last match	Starting round	Final position	Record							
Competition	First match	Last match	Starting round	Final position	Pld	W	D	L	GF	GA	GD	Win %
Primera División	11 May 2024	15 December 2024	Matchday 1	5	27	11	10	6	38	20	+18	40.74
Copa Argentina	7 February 2024	21 May 2024	Round of 64	Round of 32	2	1	1	0	4	1	+3	50.00
Copa de la Liga Profesional	28 January 2024	21 April 2024	Group stage	Quarter-finals	15	7	6	2	28	13	+15	46.67
Supercopa Argentina	14 March 2024		Final	Winners	1	1	0	0	2	1	+1	100.00
Copa Libertadores	2 April 2024	29 October 2024	Group stage	Semi-finals	12	8	3	1	18	8	+10	66.67
Total					57	28	20	9	90	43	+47	49.12

Last updated: 2 November 2024
Source: Competitions

=== Primera División ===
==== League table ====
Pos	Team	Pld	W	D	L	GF	GA	GD	Pts
3	Racing	27	14	4	9	42	30	+12	46
4	Huracán	27	12	10	5	28	18	+10	46
5	River Plate	27	11	10	6	38	21	+17	43
6	Boca Juniors	27	11	9	7	30	23	+7	42
7	Independiente	27	9	13	5	25	17	+8	40

Source: AFA
Rules for classification: 1) points; 2) goal difference; 3) goals scored; 4) head-to-head results; 5) fair play ranking 6) drawing of lots.

==== Results summary ====
Overall								Home						Away					
Pld	W	D	L	GF	GA	GD	Pts	W	D	L	GF	GA	GD	W	D	L	GF	GA	GD
15	6	6	3	20	12	+8	24	5	3	0	17	6	+11	1	3	3	3	6	−3

Last updated: 29 September 2024.

==== Results by round ====
Round	1	2	3	4	5	6	7	8	9	10	11	12	13	14	15	16
Ground	H	H	A	H	A	H	A	H	A	H	A	H	A	H	A	H
Result	W	W	L	W	L	D	L	W	D	D	D	D	D	W	W	L
Position	1	1	7	5	7	7	11	9	11	9						

Updated to match(es) played on 29 September 2024. Source:
A = Away; H = Home; W = Win; D = Draw; L = Loss

==== Matches ====
11 May 2024 1	River Plate	3–0	Central Córdoba	Buenos Aires
19:45 UTC−3				Stadium: Estadio Monumental

18 May 2024 2	River Plate	3–0	Belgrano	Buenos Aires
18:00 UTC−3				Stadium: Estadio Monumental

25 May 2024 3	Argentinos Juniors	1–0	River Plate	Buenos Aires
15:00 UTC−3				Stadium: Estadio Diego Armando Maradona

2 June 2024 4	River Plate	3–1	Tigre	Buenos Aires
20:15 UTC−3				Stadium: Estadio Monumental

13 June 2024 5	Deportivo Riestra	2–0	River Plate	Buenos Aires
15:00 UTC−3				Stadium: Estadio Guillermo Laza

21 July 2024 6	River Plate	2–2	Lanús	Buenos Aires
15:00 UTC−3				Stadium: Estadio Monumental

24 July 2024 7	Godoy Cruz	2–1	River Plate	Mendoza
19:30				Stadium: Estadio Malvinas Argentinas

28 July 2024 8	River Plate	1–0	Sarmiento	Buenos Aires
				Stadium: Estadio Monumental

4 August 2024 9	Unión de Santa Fe	0–0	River Plate	Santa Fe
15:00				Stadium: Estadio 15 de Abril

10 August 2024 10	River Plate	1–1	Huracán	Buenos Aires
				Stadium: Estadio Monumental

17 August 2024 11	Gimnasia	1–1	River Plate	La Plata
17:30 UTC−3	Castillo 83'		Fernández 55'	Stadium: Estadio Juan Carmelo Zerillo

25 August 2024 12	River Plate	0–0	Newell's Old Boys	Buenos Aires
20:30				Stadium: Estadio Monumental

1 September 2024 13	Independiente	0–0	River Plate	Avellaneda
17:00 UTC−3	Santiago López (red card) 12'			Stadium: Estadio Libertadores de América

13 September 2024 14	River Plate	4–1	Atlético Tucumán	Buenos Aires
				Stadium: Estadio Monumental

21 September 2024 15	Boca Juniors	0–1	River Plate	Buenos Aires
16:00 UTC−3	Merentiel (yellow card) 41'; Rojo (yellow card) 51'; Lema (yellow card) 89' (yellow-red card) 90+12'		Gattoni (yellow card) 1'; Lanzini 20'; Simón (yellow card) 44'; Colidio (yellow card) 45+4'; Fonseca (yellow card) 50'; Bustos (yellow card) 79'; González Pírez (yellow card) 81'	Stadium: La Bombonera

28 September 2024 16	River Plate	0–1	Talleres	Buenos Aires
18:15			Girotti 12'	Stadium: Estadio Monumental

6 October 2024 17	Platense	0–0	River Plate	Vicente López Partido
19:00				Stadium: Estadio Ciudad de Vicente López

18 October 2024 18	River Plate	1–1	Vélez Sarsfield	Buenos Aires
21:00				Stadium: Estadio Monumental

25 October 2024 19	Defensa y Justicia	0–0	River Plate	Florencio Varela Partido
21:00				Stadium: Estadio Norberto "Tito" Tomaghello

2 November 2024 20	River Plate	3–1	Banfield	Buenos Aires
17:00				Stadium: Estadio Monumental

=== Copa Libertadores ===
==== Group stage ====
Pos	Team	Pld	W	D	L	GF	GA	GD	Pts	Qualification	RIV	NAC	LIB	TAC
1	(Argentina) River Plate	6	5	1	0	12	3	+9	16	Advance to round of 16	—	2–0	2–0	2–0
2	(Uruguay) Nacional	6	3	1	2	8	7	+1	10	Advance to round of 16	2–2	—	2–0	2–1
3	(Paraguay) Libertad	6	2	1	3	7	8	−1	7	Transfer to Copa Sudamericana	1–2	2–1	—	3–0
4	(Venezuela) Deportivo Táchira	6	0	1	5	2	11	−9	1		0–2	0–1	1–1	—

Source: CONMEBOL

2 April 2024 1	Deportivo Táchira (Venezuela)	0–2	(Argentina) River Plate	San Cristóbal, Venezuela
20:00 UTC−4		Report	Boselli 72'; Fonseca 79'	Stadium: Estadio Polideportivo de Pueblo Nuevo; Attendance: 34,790; Referee: Raphael Claus (Brazil)

11 April 2024 2	River Plate (Argentina)	2–0	(Uruguay) Nacional	Buenos Aires
21:00 UTC−3	Echeverri 15'; Colidio 90+3'	Report		Stadium: Estadio Monumental; Attendance: 64,766; Referee: Cristian Garay (Chile)

24 April 2024 3	Libertad (Paraguay)	1–2	(Argentina) River Plate	Asunción, Paraguay
20:30 UTC−4	Espinoza 40'	Report	Solari 34'; Mastantuono 80'	Stadium: Estadio Defensores del Chaco; Attendance: 18,290; Referee: Raphael Claus (Brazil)
Note: Libertad played their home match against River Plate at Estadio Defensores del Chaco, Asunción instead of their regular stadium Estadio La Huerta, Asunción.

7 May 2024 4	Nacional (Uruguay)	2–2	(Argentina) River Plate	Montevideo, Uruguay
21:00 UTC−3	Carneiro 78' (pen.), 79'	Report	Borja 8'; Colidio 30'	Stadium: Estadio Gran Parque Central; Attendance: 32,959; Referee: Anderson Daronco (Brazil)

14 May 2024 5	River Plate (Argentina)	2–0	(Paraguay) Libertad	Buenos Aires
21:30 UTC−3	Borja 41', 84'	Report		Stadium: Estadio Monumental; Attendance: 61,777; Referee: Piero Maza (Chile)

30 May 2024 6	River Plate (Argentina)	2–0	(Venezuela) Deportivo Táchira	Buenos Aires
21:00 UTC−3	Borja 51', 85'	Report		Stadium: Estadio Monumental; Attendance: 63,335; Referee: Kevin Ortega (Peru)

==== Final stages ====
===== Round of 16 =====
14 August 2024 First leg	Talleres (Argentina)	0–1	(Argentina) River Plate	Córdoba
21:30 UTC−3	Suárez (red card) 60'		Díaz 86'	Stadium: Estadio Mario Alberto Kempes; Attendance: 38,734; Referee: Andrés Rojas

21 August 2024 Second leg	River Plate (Argentina)	2–1 (3–1 agg.)	(Argentina) Talleres	Buenos Aires
21:30 UTC−3	Borja 34'; Simón 50'		Girotti 69'	Stadium: Estadio Monumental; Referee: Gustavo Tejera

===== Quarter-finals =====
17 September 2024 First leg	Colo-Colo (Chile)	1–1	(Argentina) River Plate	Macul, Chile
20:30 UTC−4	Palacios 61'; Falcón (red card) 90'		Pezzella 43'; Díaz (red card) 90'	Stadium: Estadio Monumental David Arellano; Attendance: 40,885; Referee: Raphael Claus (Brazil)

24 September 2024 Second leg	River Plate (Argentina)	1–0 (2–1 agg.)	(Chile) Colo-Colo	Buenos Aires
21:30 UTC−3	Colidio 16'			Stadium: Estadio Monumental; Attendance: 67,195; Referee: Andrés Matonte (Uruguay)

===== Semi-finals =====
22 October 2024 First leg	Atlético Mineiro (Brazil)	3–0	(Argentina) River Plate	Belo Horizonte, Brazil
21:30 UTC−3	Deyverson 22', 70'; Paulinho 74'			Stadium: Arena MRV; Referee: Jesús Valenzuela (Venezuela)

29 October 2024 Second leg	River Plate (Argentina)	0–0 (0–3 agg.)	(Brazil) Atlético Mineiro	Buenos Aires
21:30 UTC−3				Stadium: Estadio Monumental
