= Franco Mastantuono =

Argentine footballer (born 2007)

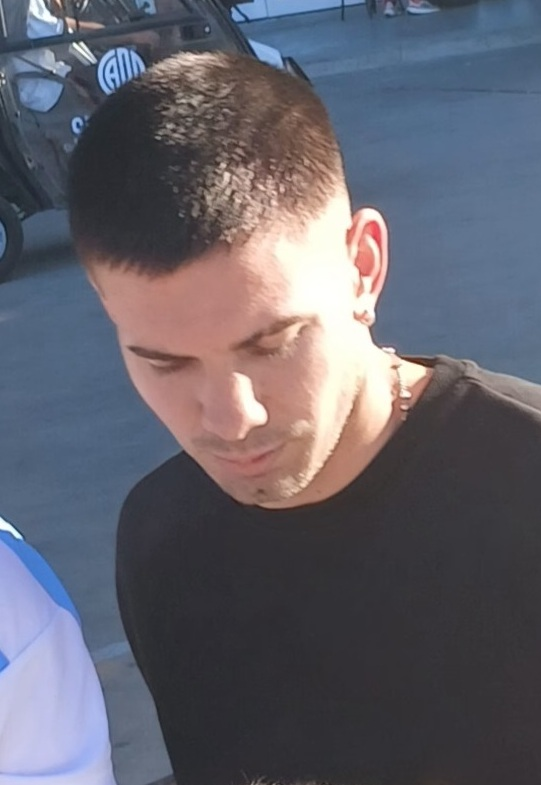
- Mastantuono in 2025

Personal information
- Full name: Franco Mastantuono
- Date of birth: 14 August 2007 (age 19)
- Place of birth: Azul, Argentina
- Height: 1.78 m (5 ft 10 in)
- Positions: Attacking midfielder; winger

Team information
- Current team: Fiorentina (on loan from Real Madrid)
- Number: 30

Youth career
- 2011–2018: River de Azul
- 2018–2019: Club Cemento
- 2019–2024: River Plate

Senior career*
Years	Team	Apps	(Gls)
2024–2025	River Plate	45	(5)
2025–	Real Madrid	23	(1)
2026–	→ Fiorentina (loan)	11	(4)

International career^{‡}
2022–2023	Argentina U17	9	(1)
2024–2025	Argentina U20	12	(2)
2025–	Argentina	8	(3)
Medal record
Men's football
Representing Argentina
South American U-20 Championship
Runner-up	2025 Venezuela
- * Club domestic league appearances and goals as of 18:59, 8 November 2026 (UTC) ‡ National team caps and goals as of 01:30, 18 November 2026 (UTC)

Franco Mastantuono (born 14 August 2007) is an Argentine professional footballer who plays as a winger for Serie A club Fiorentina, on loan from La Liga club Real Madrid, and the Argentina national team.

== Early life ==
Mastantuono was born and raised in Azul in the Buenos Aires Province of Argentina, into a family of Italian Argentine background. He took an interest in tennis as a younger child and was a national-level youth player, being ranked in the top 10 of his category.

== Club career ==
=== Early career ===
Mastantuono began his footballing career at the age of three, playing for River de Azul, where his father was the coach. In 2017, while playing for River de Azul, he was invited to trial with professional side River Plate, but despite being offered a place in the academy, he declined, as his family wanted him to continue pursuing a career in tennis. Instead, he signed for Club Cemento at the age of eleven.

=== River Plate ===
Two years later, in 2019, Mastantuono decided to take up River Plate's offer, and moved to the Buenos Aires-based club, making his first appearance for the youth side in their last game of the 2019 season, as the youth side won their respective league. The following year, he was registered for AFA competitions, but his season was disrupted due to the COVID-19 pandemic in Argentina.

Mastantuono continued his progression through the River Plate academy, and in August 2023, he signed his first contract with the club – a two-year deal with a €30 million release clause. The following month, he was called up to first-team training by manager Martín Demichelis for the first time.

The following year, Mastantuono was included in River Plate's squad for their pre-season preparations, having been called up alongside a number of other youth team players by coach Martín Demichelis. He made his unofficial debut for the club in a friendly match against Mexican opposition Monterrey, before featuring in another friendly against Pachuca. At the end of January 2024, he became River Plate's third youngest ever player in official competitions, behind Omar Rossi and Mateo Musacchio, when he came on as a second-half substitute for Facundo Colidio in River's 1–1 Copa de la Liga Profesional draw with Argentinos Juniors.

Mastantuono scored his first goal for the club in a 3–0 Copa Argentina win against Excursionistas on 8 February 2024; having started the game, he volleyed the ball past Excursionistas goalkeeper Nahuel Cajal in the 68th minute. In doing so, he became River's youngest ever goalscorer, beating the record held by club icon Javier Saviola. Having established himself as a fixture in the first-team setup, calls from fans for Mastantuono to play more were ignored by coach Martín Demichelis, with former River Plate defender Reinaldo Merlo stating that, while he had shown his ability, he was not ready to feature regularly. After Demichelis left Marcelo Gallardo took over giving him more minutes and making him feature regularly. In the Superclásico against Boca Juniors, Mastantuono scored a free kick from 28 meters out into the top left corner, making him the second youngest player to score in a Superclásico and River Plate's youngest to score in one.

=== Real Madrid ===
On 13 June 2025, La Liga club Real Madrid announced that Mastantuono would join the club on his 18th birthday, 14 August, signing a six-year deal with Los Blancos. The deal was worth €45 million, with Madrid triggering his release clause.

On 14 August 2025, Real Madrid officially presented Mastantuono. He was assigned the number 30 shirt, the same number he wore at his previous club. He made his debut for Madrid on 19 August 2025, coming on as a substitute in a 1–0 victory over Osasuna. On 16 September, aged 18 years and 33 days, Mastantuono surpassed his teammate Endrick's record by 40 days to become the youngest player to start for Real Madrid in the UEFA Champions League, featuring in the team's 2–1 victory over Marseille. On 23 September, he scored his debut goal for Los Blancos, finding the back of the net in Madrid's 4–1 league win at Levante. On 20 January 2026, he scored his first Champions League goal in a 6–1 victory over Monaco.

==== Loan to Fiorentina ====
On 7 August 2026, Real Madrid announced that Mastantuono had been sent on a loan to Serie A club Fiorentina until 30 June 2027. On 11 September 2026, Mastantuono scored a hat-trick in Fiorentina's 4–2 victory over Venezia in Serie A, scoring twice in the first half before completing his hat-trick in the 84th minute. The performance made him the youngest player to score a hat-trick for Fiorentina in Serie A, while at 19 years and 28 days he also became the youngest Argentine to score a hat-trick in one of Europe's top five leagues, surpassing the previous record held by Lionel Messi.

== International career ==
Born and raised in Argentina, Mastantuono is of Italian descent and holds dual Argentine-Italian citizenship. He was first called up to the Argentina national under-17 team squad by manager Pablo Aimar while still only fifteen. His impressive performances with the River Plate youth teams caught the attention of Argentina national under-20 team coach Javier Mascherano, who called him up to train with the team in mid-2022.

In late May 2025, Mastantuono got his first call-up to the Argentina senior team by Lionel Scaloni for the 2026 World Cup qualifying games against Chile and Colombia. A few days later, on 5 June, he made his international debut by replacing Thiago Almada in a 1–0 away victory over Chile, becoming his country's youngest official debutant at 17 years and 296 days old, surpassing the previous record held by Adolfo Heisinger.

== Style of play ==
A left-footed midfielder, Mastantuono was described by River Plate youth coach Martín Pellegrino as a being capable of playing as an enganche, a play-making midfielder or a forward, noting his ball-striking ability. River Plate reserve team assistant manager, Pablo Fernández, has also lauded his ball-striking, as well as his ability to score from free-kicks and beat players one-on-one. Mastantuono himself has stated that he looks up to River Plate forwards Ignacio Fernández and Matías Suárez, as well as fellow Argentine Julián Alvarez and the likes of Phil Foden and Neymar, and tries to model his style of play on them.

== Career statistics ==
=== Club ===
As of match played 8 November 2026

Appearances and goals by club, season and competition
Club	Season	League			National cup (Note: Includes Copa Argentina, Copa del Rey, Coppa Italia)		Continental		Other		Total	
Club	Season	Division	Apps	Goals	Apps	Goals	Apps	Goals	Apps	Goals	Apps	Goals
River Plate	2024	Argentine Primera División	33	1	1	1	7 (Note: Appearances in Copa Libertadores)	1	0	0	41	3
River Plate	2025	Argentine Primera División	12	4	1	1	6	2	4 (Note: One appearance in Supercopa Internacional, three appearances in FIFA Club World Cup)	0	23	7
River Plate	Total		45	5	2	2	13	3	4	0	64	10
Real Madrid	2025–26	La Liga	23	1	2	1	8 (Note: Appearances in UEFA Champions League)	1	2 (Note: Appearances in Supercopa de España)	0	35	3
Fiorentina (loan)	2026–27	Serie A	11	4	2	0	—		—		13	4
Career total			79	10	6	3	21	4	6	0	112	17

=== International ===
As of match played 17 November 2026

Appearances and goals by national team and year
National team	Year	Apps	Goals
Argentina	2025	3	0
Argentina	2026	5	3
Total		8	3

Scores and results list Argentina's goal tally first, score column indicates score after each Mastantuono goal.

List of international goals scored by Franco Mastantuono
No.	Date	Venue	Cap	Opponent	Score	Result	Competition
1	3 October 2026	Estadio Monumental, Buenos Aires, Argentina	6	Burkina Faso	6–0	7–0	Friendly
2	17 November 2026	Estadio Mario Alberto Kempes, Córdoba, Argentina	8	Costa Rica	5–0	7–0	Friendly
3	17 November 2026	Estadio Mario Alberto Kempes, Córdoba, Argentina	8	Costa Rica	7–0	7–0	Friendly

== Honours ==
River Plate

- Supercopa Argentina: 2024
