= Enzo Pérez =

Argentine footballer (born 1986)

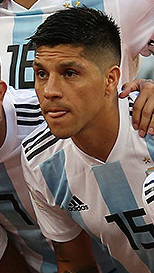
- Pérez with Argentina at the 2018 FIFA World Cup

Personal information
- Full name: Enzo Nicolás Pérez
- Date of birth: 22 February 1986 (age 40)
- Place of birth: Maipú, Argentina
- Height: 1.78 m (5 ft 10 in)
- Position: Midfielder

Team information
- Current team: Deportivo Maipú
- Number: 8

Youth career
- 1996–2003: Deportivo Maipú

Senior career*
| Years | Team | Apps | (Gls) |
| 2003–2007 | Godoy Cruz | 30 | (5) |
| 2007–2011 | Estudiantes | 109 | (14) |
| 2011–2014 | Benfica | 70 | (9) |
| 2012 | → Estudiantes (loan) | 14 | (0) |
| 2015–2017 | Valencia | 61 | (0) |
| 2017–2024 | River Plate | 151 | (2) |
| 2024 | Estudiantes | 36 | (0) |
| 2025 | River Plate | 24 | (0) |
| 2026 | Argentinos Juniors | 8 | (0) |
| 2026– | Deportivo Maipú | 5 | (0) |

International career
| 2009–2018 | Argentina | 26 | (1) |
Medal record
Representing Argentina
FIFA World Cup
| Runner-up | 2014 Brazil |
- * Club domestic league appearances and goals as of 13:23, 31 August 2026 (UTC)

Enzo Nicolás Pérez (Spanish pronunciation: [ˈenso ˈpeɾes]; born 22 February 1986) is an Argentine professional footballer who plays as a midfielder for Primera Nacional club Deportivo Maipú.

He started his career in Argentina with Godoy Cruz and Estudiantes. In 2011, Pérez moved to S.L. Benfica in Portugal, where he won five trophies in four seasons, most notably the domestic treble in the 2013–14 season, and reached two consecutive UEFA Europa League finals. He moved to Spanish club Valencia in 2015, before returning to Argentina in 2017 with River Plate where he played until 2024. This was followed by short spells at Estudiantes, River Plate and Argentinos Juniors. He was part of the Argentina squads for the 2014 and 2018 World Cups. He started the 2014 final which Argentina lost.

== Club career ==
=== Early career ===
Born in Maipú, Mendoza, Pérez began his career in Deportivo Maipú, like his father, and started his professional playing career with Godoy Cruz, where he wrote his name into club history by scoring a fifth-minute goal in the 1–1 draw with Belgrano on 9 September 2006. This was the first goal ever scored by Godoy Cruz in the Argentine first division. In total, he scored 12 goals in his career at Godoy Cruz, most coming from penalties.

=== Estudiantes ===
In 2007, Pérez joined Estudiantes de La Plata, where he finished as runner-up with the team in the 2008 Copa Sudamericana. He was then a first team regular in the team that won the 2009 Copa Libertadores.

=== Benfica ===
On 8 June 2011, Pérez signed a five-year contract with Portuguese club Benfica for a fee rumored to be around €5.5 million for his full rights from Estudiantes. After a serious knee injury sustained in the Champions League qualifiers, Pérez was loaned back to Estudiantes for six months on 9 February 2012.

On 27 July 2012, at the Eusébio Cup, Pérez scored a long-range goal against Real Madrid from a tight angle to complete a 5–2 win.

In the 2012–13 season, Pérez was successfully converted into a central midfielder, partnering with Nemanja Matić, assuming a central role in the team.

In the 2013–14 season, his influence was further increased after the departure of Matić to Chelsea on 15 January 2014, becoming a vital piece in Benfica's domestic treble (Primeira Liga, Taça de Portugal and Taça da Liga) and their second consecutive Europa League Final. Pérez, however, was not present in the eventual loss on penalties (4–2) to Sevilla in the final, having picked up a suspension in the semi-final against Juventus on 1 May 2014. His performances attracted attention from other clubs, while Benfica manager Jorge Jesus named Pérez his side's most difficult player to replace and the "brain" of the team. On 6 July 2014, Pérez won the Player of the Year award.

At the beginning of the 2014–15 season, Pérez won the Supertaça Cândido de Oliveira, thus winning all four Portuguese titles with Benfica in the 2014 calendar year.

=== Valencia ===
On 2 January 2015, Spanish La Liga club Valencia CF signed Pérez for a transfer fee of €25 million, the tenth-highest ever fee for an Argentine player. On 4 January, he debuted for Valencia in a home win over Real Madrid (2–1) in La Liga.

=== River Plate ===
On 29 June 2017, Pérez returned to Argentina and signed for River Plate for a transfer fee of €2.5 million.

Ahead of a Copa Libertadores match on 19 May 2021, River Plate announced that over twenty players, including all four rostered goalkeepers, would miss the match due to a COVID-19 outbreak within the squad. With no substitutes, the injured Pérez volunteered to play in goal for the entirety of the match against Colombian side Independiente Santa Fe in which River Plate won 2–1. Pérez made a number of key saves and was awarded with the man of the match for his performance. On 21 April 2021, Pérez extended his contract until December 2023.

=== Return to Estudiantes ===
In January 2024, a free transfer saw Pérez returning to Estudiantes for a third spell, signing a one-year contract.

=== Return to River Plate ===
In January 2025, a free transfer saw Pérez returning to River Plate for a third spell, signing a one-year contract.

=== Argentinos Juniors ===
In January 2026, Pérez joined Argentinos Juniors as a free agent, signing a one-year contract.

== International career ==
Pérez made his Argentina senior squad debut on 30 September 2009 under then-manager Diego Maradona in a friendly match against Ghana, an eventual 2–0 victory for the Albicelestes.

On 2 June 2014, Pérez was called up for the 2014 FIFA World Cup by manager Alejandro Sabella. After midfielder Ángel Di María sustained an injury in the quarter-finals, Pérez started in his place in both the semi-final and final against Germany, which Argentina lost 1–0 after extra time.

In May 2018, Pérez was named in Argentina's preliminary squad for the 2018 FIFA World Cup, but did not make the final list. However, on 9 June 2018, he was called up as a replacement for the injured Manuel Lanzini.

== Career statistics ==
=== Club ===
As of match played 20 February 2026

Appearances and goals by club, season and competition
| Club | Season | League | | | National Cup | | League Cup | | Continental (Note: Includes the Copa Libertadores, UEFA Champions League and UEFA Europa League.) | | Other (Note: Includes the FIFA Club World Cup, Recopa Sudamericana, Portuguese Supercup and Supercopa Argentina.) | | Total | |
| Club | Season | Division | Apps | Goals | Apps | Goals | Apps | Goals | Apps | Goals | Apps | Goals | Apps | Goals |
|---|---|---|---|---|---|---|---|---|---|---|---|---|---|---|
| Godoy Cruz | 2006-2007 | Argentine Primera División | 30 | 5 | 0 | 0 | 0 | 0 | 0 | 0 | 2 | 0 | 32 | 5 |
| Godoy Cruz | Total | | 30 | 5 | 0 | 0 | 0 | 0 | 0 | 0 | 2 | 0 | 32 | 5 |
| Estudiantes | 2007-2008 | Argentine Primera División | 20 | 1 | 0 | 0 | — | | 1 | 0 | 0 | 0 | 21 | 1 |
| Estudiantes | 2008–09 | Argentine Primera División | 26 | 4 | 0 | 0 | — | | 8 | 1 | 0 | 0 | 34 | 5 |
| Estudiantes | 2009–10 | Argentine Primera División | 30 | 4 | 0 | 0 | — | | 15 | 2 | 0 | 0 | 45 | 6 |
| Estudiantes | 2010–11 | Argentine Primera División | 33 | 5 | 0 | 0 | — | | 11 | 1 | 4 | 0 | 48 | 6 |
| Estudiantes | Total | | 109 | 14 | 0 | 0 | 0 | 0 | 35 | 4 | 4 | 0 | 148 | 18 |
| Estudiantes (loan) | 2011–12 | Argentine Primera División | 14 | 0 | 0 | 0 | 0 | 0 | 7 | 0 | 0 | 0 | 21 | 0 |
| Estudiantes (loan) | Total | | 14 | 0 | 0 | 0 | 0 | 0 | 7 | 0 | 0 | 0 | 21 | 0 |
| Benfica | 2011–12 | Primeira Liga | 3 | 0 | 0 | 0 | 0 | 0 | 1 | 0 | — | | 4 | 0 |
| Benfica | 2012–13 | Primeira Liga | 28 | 4 | 3 | 0 | 3 | 0 | 13 | 0 | — | | 47 | 4 |
| Benfica | 2013–14 | Primeira Liga | 28 | 4 | 4 | 1 | 3 | 0 | 12 | 0 | — | | 47 | 5 |
| Benfica | 2014–15 | Primeira Liga | 11 | 1 | 2 | 0 | 0 | 0 | 5 | 0 | 1 | 0 | 19 | 1 |
| Benfica | Total | | 70 | 9 | 9 | 1 | 6 | 0 | 31 | 0 | 1 | 0 | 117 | 10 |
| Valencia | 2014–15 | La Liga | 14 | 0 | 1 | 0 | 0 | 0 | — | | — | | 15 | 0 |
| Valencia | 2015–16 | La Liga | 20 | 0 | 3 | 0 | 0 | 0 | 7 | 0 | — | | 30 | 0 |
| Valencia | 2016–17 | La Liga | 27 | 0 | 2 | 0 | 0 | 0 | — | | — | | 29 | 0 |
| Valencia | Total | | 61 | 0 | 6 | 0 | 0 | 0 | 7 | 0 | 0 | 0 | 74 | 0 |
| River Plate | 2017 | Argentine Primera División | 0 | 0 | 4 | 1 | — | | 5 | 2 | 1 | 0 | 10 | 3 |
| River Plate | 2018 | Argentine Primera División | 18 | 0 | 2 | 0 | 0 | 0 | 12 | 0 | 0 | 0 | 32 | 0 |
| River Plate | 2019 | Argentine Primera División | 16 | 0 | 6 | 0 | 4 | 1 | 12 | 0 | 4 | 0 | 42 | 1 |
| River Plate | 2020 | Argentine Primera División | 24 | 0 | 3 | 0 | 0 | 0 | 9 | 0 | 1 | 0 | 37 | 0 |
| River Plate | 2021 | Argentine Primera División | 30 | 2 | 0 | 0 | 0 | 0 | 6 | 0 | 1 | 0 | 37 | 2 |
| River Plate | 2022 | Argentine Primera División | 31 | 0 | 2 | 0 | 0 | 0 | 7 | 0 | 1 | 0 | 41 | 0 |
| River Plate | 2023 | Argentine Primera División | 32 | 0 | 1 | 0 | 0 | 0 | 7 | 0 | 3 | 0 | 43 | 0 |
| River Plate | Total | | 151 | 2 | 18 | 1 | 4 | 1 | 58 | 2 | 11 | 0 | 242 | 6 |
| Estudiantes | 2023 | Argentine Primera División | 0 | 0 | 0 | 0 | 0 | 0 | 0 | 0 | 1 | 0 | 1 | 0 |
| Estudiantes | 2024 | Argentine Primera División | 36 | 0 | 1 | 0 | 0 | 0 | 6 | 0 | 1 | 0 | 44 | 0 |
| Estudiantes | Total | | 36 | 0 | 1 | 0 | 0 | 0 | 6 | 0 | 2 | 0 | 45 | 0 |
| River Plate | 2024 | Argentine Primera División | 0 | 0 | 0 | 0 | 0 | 0 | 0 | 0 | 1 | 0 | 1 | 0 |
| River Plate | 2025 | Argentine Primera División | 22 | 0 | 2 | 0 | 0 | 0 | 9 | 0 | 4 | 0 | 37 | 0 |
| River Plate | Total | | 22 | 0 | 2 | 0 | 0 | 0 | 9 | 0 | 5 | 0 | 38 | 0 |
| Argentinos Juniors | 2026 | Argentine Primera División | 4 | 0 | 1 | 0 | 0 | 0 | 1 | 0 | 0 | 0 | 6 | 0 |
| Argentinos Juniors | Total | | 4 | 0 | 1 | 0 | 0 | 0 | 1 | 0 | 0 | 0 | 6 | 0 |
| Career total | | | 497 | 30 | 37 | 2 | 10 | 1 | 154 | 6 | 25 | 0 | 723 | 39 |

=== International ===
As of match played 30 June 2018

Appearances and goals by national team and year
| National team | Year | Apps | Goals |
|---|---|---|---|
| Argentina | 2009 | 2 | 0 |
| Argentina | 2010 | 1 | 0 |
| Argentina | 2011 | 2 | 1 |
| Argentina | 2012 | 1 | 0 |
| Argentina | 2013 | 0 | 0 |
| Argentina | 2014 | 9 | 0 |
| Argentina | 2015 | 1 | 0 |
| Argentina | 2016 | 2 | 0 |
| Argentina | 2017 | 5 | 0 |
| Argentina | 2018 | 3 | 0 |
| Total | | 26 | 1 |

Scores and results list Argentina's goal tally first, score column indicates score after Pérez goal.

International goal scored by Enzo Pérez
| No. | Date | Venue | Opponent | Score | Result | Competition |
|---|---|---|---|---|---|---|
| 1 | 25 May 2011 | Estadio Centenario, Resistencia, Argentina | Paraguay | 4–2 | 4–2 | Friendly |

== Honours ==
Godoy Cruz

- Primera B Nacional: 2005–06

Estudiantes

- Copa Libertadores: 2009
- Argentine Primera División: 2010 Apertura
- Copa de la Liga Profesional: 2024
- Trofeo de Campeones de la Liga Profesional: 2024
- FIFA Club World Cup runner-up: 2009
- Recopa Sudamericana runner-up: 2010

Benfica

- Primeira Liga: 2013–14, 2014–15
- Taça de Portugal: 2013–14
- Taça da Liga: 2013–14
- Supertaça Cândido de Oliveira: 2014
- UEFA Europa League runner-up: 2012–13, 2013–14

River Plate

- Copa Argentina: 2017, 2019
- Supercopa Argentina: 2017, 2019
- Copa Libertadores: 2018
- Recopa Sudamericana: 2019
- Argentine Primera División: 2021, 2023
- Trofeo de Campeones de la Liga Profesional: 2021, 2023

Argentina

- FIFA World Cup runner-up: 2014
- Superclásico de las Américas runner-up: 2014

Individual

- Copa Libertadores Team of the Tournament: 2019, 2020
- South American Team of the Year: 2019, 2020
- O Jogo Team of the Year: 2013
- LPFP Primeira Liga Player of the Year: 2013–14
