= Paulo Díaz =

Chilean footballer (born 1994)

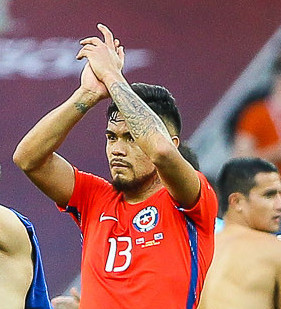
- Díaz with Chile at the 2017 Confederations Cup

Personal information
- Full name: Paulo César Díaz Huincales
- Date of birth: 25 August 1994 (age 32)
- Place of birth: Santa Cruz, Chile
- Height: 1.78 m (5 ft 10 in)
- Positions: Centre-back; full-back

Team information
- Current team: Atlanta United
- Number: 27

Youth career
- 2003–2006: Cobreloa
- 2008–2009: Audax Italiano
- 2010–2013: Palestino

Senior career*
Years	Team	Apps	(Gls)
2013–2015	Palestino	47	(6)
2015	Colo-Colo	1	(0)
2016–2018	San Lorenzo	47	(5)
2018–2019	Al-Ahli	24	(0)
2019–2026	River Plate	154	(8)
2026–	Atlanta United	12	(0)

International career^{‡}
2015–	Chile	58	(1)
Medal record
Representing Chile
Runner-up	FIFA Confederations Cup	2017
- * Club domestic league appearances and goals as of 13:23, 15 November 2026 (UTC) ‡ National team caps and goals as of 23:06, 6 October 2026 (UTC)

Paulo César Díaz Huincales (Latin American Spanish: [ˈpawlo ˈði.as] born 25 August 1994), known as Paulo Díaz, is a Chilean professional footballer who plays as a centre-back for Major League Soccer club Atlanta United and the Chile national team.

== Club career ==
Díaz spent seven seasons with Argentine giant River Plate from 2019 to 2026. On 14 July 2026, he signed with Major League Soccer club Atlanta United until June 2028.

== International career ==
He got his first call up to the senior Chile squad for a friendly against the United States in January 2015 and made his international debut in the match.

== Personal life ==
He is the son of former defender Ítalo Díaz, who played for the Chile national team in 2001. His younger brother, Nicolás, is a Chilean international footballer too.

Díaz Huincales is of Mapuche descent.

Díaz naturalized Argentine by residence in 2024.

== Career statistics ==
=== Club ===
As of match played 9 November 2025

Appearances and goals by club, season and competition
Club	Season	League			National cup (Note: Includes Copa Chile, Copa Argentina and King's Cup)		Continental		Other		Total	
Club	Season	Division	Apps	Goals	Apps	Goals	Apps	Goals	Apps	Goals	Apps	Goals
Palestino	2013	Chilean Primera División	3	0	3	0	–		–		6	0
Palestino	2013–14	Chilean Primera División	16	0	0	0	–		–		16	0
Palestino	2014–15	Chilean Primera División	28	6	10	1	7 (Note: Appearances in Copa Libertadores)	0	–		45	7
Palestino	Total		47	6	13	1	7	0	–		67	7
Colo-Colo	2015–16	Chilean Primera División	2	0	4	0	–		–		6	0
San Lorenzo	2016	Argentine Primera División	7	0	4	1	5	0	–		16	1
San Lorenzo	2016–17	Argentine Primera División	19	3	1	0	8	1	–		28	4
San Lorenzo	2017–18	Argentine Primera División	21	2	1	1	3 (Note: Appearances in Copa Sudamericana)	0	–		25	3
San Lorenzo	Total		47	5	6	2	16	1	–		69	8
Al-Ahli	2018–19	Saudi Pro League	24	0	1	0	6 (Note: Appearances in AFC Champions League)	0	4 (Note: Appearances in Arab Club Champions Cup)	2	35	2
River Plate	2019–20	Argentine Primera División	10	0	1	0	2	0	1 (Note: Appearance in Supercopa Argentina)	0	14	0
River Plate	2020–21	Argentine Primera División	5	0	3	0	9	2	1	0	18	2
River Plate	2021	Argentine Primera División	28	1	0	0	7	1	1 (Note: Appearance in Trofeo de Campeones de la Liga Profesional)	0	36	2
River Plate	2022	Argentine Primera División	24	1	2	0	7	0	–		33	1
River Plate	2023	Argentine Primera División	27	2	2	0	7	0	1 (Note: Appearance in Supercopa Internacional)	0	37	2
River Plate	2024	Argentine Primera División	34	3	1	0	11	0	1	0	47	3
River Plate	2025	Argentine Primera División	20	1	1	0	6	1	2 (Note: Appearances in FIFA Club World Cup)	0	29	2
River Plate	Total		148	8	10	0	49	4	7	0	214	12
Career total			268	19	34	3	78	5	11	2	391	29

=== International ===
As of match played 6 October 2026

Appearances and goals by national team and year
National team	Year	Apps	Goals
Chile	2015	1	0
Chile	2017	8	0
Chile	2018	7	0
Chile	2019	7	0
Chile	2020	4	0
Chile	2021	4	0
Chile	2022	8	0
Chile	2023	5	1
Chile	2024	8	0
Chile	2025	4	0
Chile	2026	2	0
Total		58	1

No.	Date	Venue	Opponent	Score	Result	Competition
1.	27 March 2023	Estadio Monumental David Arellano, Santiago, Chile	Paraguay	2–2	3–2	Friendly

== Honours ==
Colo-Colo

- Chilean Primera División: 2015 Apertura

River Plate

- Argentine Primera División: 2021, 2023
- Copa Argentina: 2018–19
- Supercopa Argentina: 2019, 2023
- Trofeo de Campeones de la Liga Profesional: 2021, 2023
