= Pablo Solari =

Argentine footballer (born 2001)

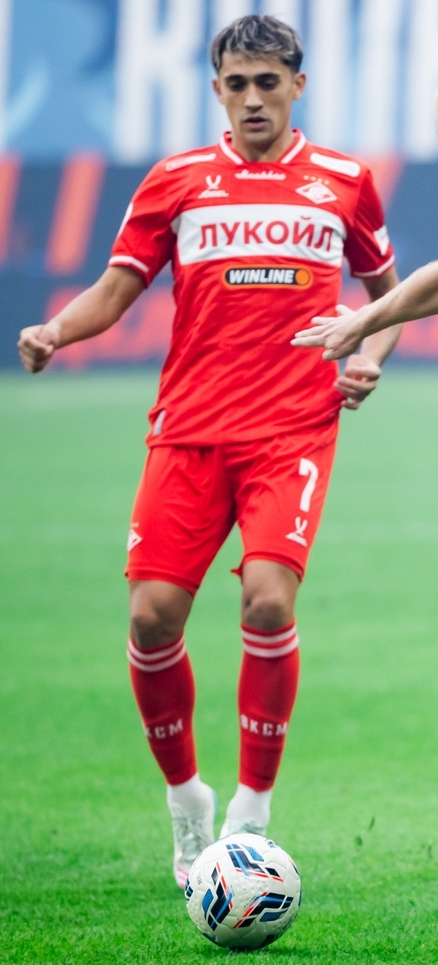
- Solari with Spartak Moscow in 2026

Personal information
- Full name: Pablo César Solari Ferreyra
- Date of birth: 22 March 2001 (age 25)
- Place of birth: Arizona, Argentina
- Height: 1.78 m (5 ft 10 in)
- Position: Forward

Team information
- Current team: Spartak Moscow
- Number: 7

Youth career
- Club Rumbo a Vélez
- Talleres

Senior career*
Years	Team	Apps	(Gls)
2020–2021	Talleres	0	(0)
2020–2021	→ Colo-Colo (loan)	37	(5)
2022	Colo-Colo	17	(5)
2022–2025	River Plate	85	(23)
2025–	Spartak Moscow	54	(13)

International career^{‡}
- Argentina U16
2019	Argentina U18	4	(1)
- * Club domestic league appearances and goals as of 22 November 2026 ‡ National team caps and goals as of 4 April 2022

Pablo César Solari Ferreyra (born 22 March 2001) is an Argentine professional footballer who plays as a forward for Russian Premier League club Spartak Moscow.

== Club career ==
Solari joined Talleres from Club Rumbo a Vélez at the age of thirteen. He signed his first professional contract in February 2020, having trained with Talleres' first-team in the preceding month; notably appearing in a Torneos de Verano friendly with San Lorenzo on 11 January. Towards the end of 2020, Solari was an unused substitute for Copa de la Liga Profesional matches with Newell's Old Boys, on 30 October, and Lanús, on 9 November. On 20 November, Solari headed to Chilean Primera División side Colo-Colo on loan until 31 January 2021. He made his debut on 5 December off the bench in a draw away to Huachipato.

On 2 February 2021, after five appearances, Solari's loan with Colo-Colo was extended until 31 December. On 17 February, Solari scored the only goal of the game as Colo-Colo defeated Universidad de Concepción in a play-off to avoid relegation.

On 11 February 2025, Solari signed a four-and-a-half-year contract with Spartak Moscow of the Russian Premier League.

== International career ==
Solari represented Argentina at U16 and U18 level. He was a part of the U16 side that won the 2019 Montaigu Tournament. Later that year, for the U18s, Solari made four appearances and scored one goal (versus Mauritania) at the 2019 COTIF Tournament in Spain; under manager Esteban Solari (no relation).

== Style of play ==
Solari is primarily a winger, though he holds experience as a centre-back, an attacking midfielder and as a centre-forward from his youth career.

== Personal life ==
Solari is the son of former footballer Victor Solari, who played in the local Liga Roca with Sportivo Realicó in the 1990s. He also has three footballing brothers: Santiago, Mateo and Juan.

== Career statistics ==
As of 22 November 2026.

Appearances and goals by club, season and competition
Club	Season	League			Cup		Continental		Other		Total	
Club	Season	Division	Apps	Goals	Apps	Goals	Apps	Goals	Apps	Goals	Apps	Goals
Talleres	2020–21 (Note: Soccerway counts Copa de la Liga Profesional appearances as league appearances.)	Argentine Primera División	0	0	0	0	0	0	0	0	0	0
Colo-Colo (loan)	2020	Chilean Primera División	9	1	0	0	0	0	1 (Note: Appearance in the relegation play-offs)	1	10	2
Colo-Colo (loan)	2021	Chilean Primera División	28	4	6	4	0	0	1 (Note: Appearance in Supercopa de Chile)	0	35	8
Colo-Colo (loan)	Total		37	5	6	4	0	0	2	1	45	10
Colo-Colo	2022	Chilean Primera División	17	5	1	0	8 (Note: Six appearances, one goal in Copa Libertadores, two appearances, one goal in Copa Sudamericana)	2	3 (Note: One appearance in Supercopa de Chile, two appearances in Torneos de Verano)	0	29	7
River Plate	2022	Argentine Primera División	17	5	2	3	—		—		19	8
River Plate	2023	Argentine Primera División	35	9	2	0	8 (Note: Appearances in Copa Libertadores)	3	1 (Note: Appearance in Trofeo de Campeones)	0	46	12
River Plate	2024	Argentine Primera División	32	9	1	0	9	1	1 (Note: Appearance in the 2023 Supercopa Argentina, played in 2024)	0	43	10
River Plate	2025	Argentine Primera División	1	0	0	0	—		—		1	0
River Plate	Total		85	23	5	3	17	4	2	0	109	30
Spartak Moscow	2024–25	Russian Premier League	11	2	4	0	—		—		15	2
Spartak Moscow	2025–26	Russian Premier League	28	8	11	3	—		—		39	11
Spartak Moscow	2026–27	Russian Premier League	15	3	3	3	—		1 (Note: Appearance in Russian Super Cup)	0	19	6
Spartak Moscow	Total		54	13	18	6	0	0	1	0	73	19
Career total			193	46	30	13	25	6	8	1	256	66

== Honours ==
Argentina U16

- Montaigu Tournament: 2019

Colo-Colo

- Liga de Primera: 2022
- Copa Chile: 2021
- Supercopa de Chile: 2022

River Plate

- Argentine Primera División: 2023
- Trofeo de Campeones: 2023
- Supercopa Argentina: 2023

Spartak Moscow

- Russian Cup: 2025–26
