= Kevin Castaño =

Colombian footballer

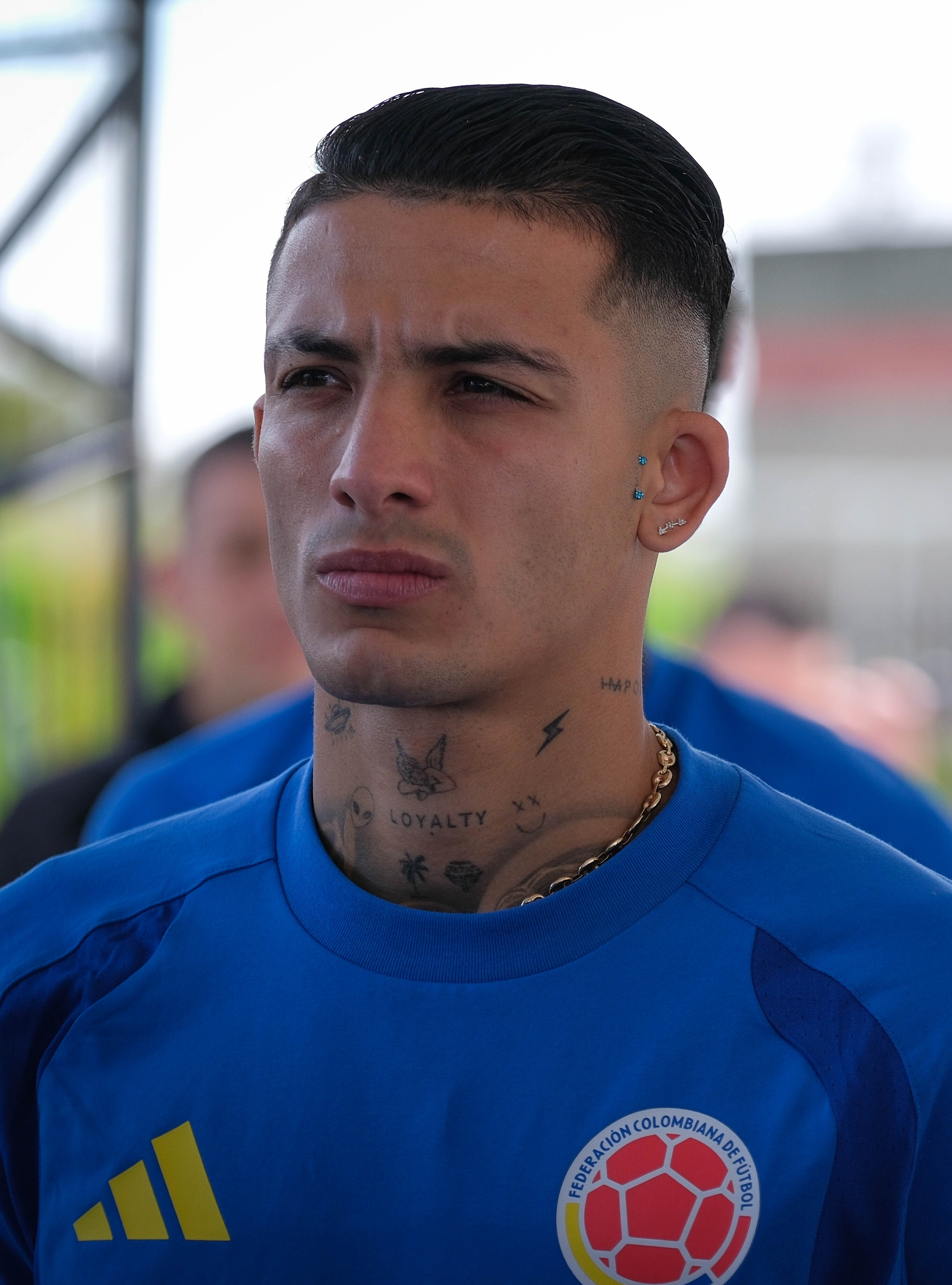
- Castaño in 2026

Personal information
- Full name: Kevin Duván Castaño Gil
- Date of birth: 29 September 2000 (age 26)
- Place of birth: Itagüí, Colombia
- Height: 1.77 m (5 ft 10 in)
- Position: Defensive midfielder

Team information
- Current team: Atlético Mineiro (on loan from River Plate)
- Number: 15

Youth career
- –2020: Águilas Doradas

Senior career*
Years	Team	Apps	(Gls)
2020–2023	Águilas Doradas	75	(2)
2023–2024	Cruz Azul	13	(0)
2024–2025	Krasnodar	25	(1)
2025–	River Plate	27	(0)
2026–	→ Atlético Mineiro (loan)	5	(0)

International career^{‡}
2023–	Colombia	30	(0)
Medal record
Men's football
Representing Colombia
Copa América
Runner-up	2024 United States
- * Club domestic league appearances and goals as of 23:13, 19 September 2026 (UTC) ‡ National team caps and goals as of 6 October 2026

Kevin Duván Castaño Gil (born 29 September 2000) is a Colombian professional footballer who plays as a defensive midfielder for Campeonato Brasileiro Série A club Atlético Mineiro, on loan from Argentine Primera División club River Plate, and the Colombia national team.

A product of Águilas Doradas, Castaño established himself in Colombia before moving abroad in 2023 to join Cruz Azul in Mexico. He later transferred to FC Krasnodar, where he won the Russian Premier League in his first season, the club's first league title in history. In 2025, he signed with River Plate in Argentina.

At international level, Castaño made his senior debut for Colombia in 2023 and was part of the squad that finished runners-up at the 2024 Copa América and part of the squad that made it to the round of 16 at the 2026 World Cup.

== Club career ==
=== Águilas Doradas ===
Born in Itagüí, Castaño came through the academy system at Águilas Doradas having joined when he was 12 years old. By the age of fifteen he was promoted to their under-20 team, and at eighteen years-old made the step up to the senior team, and his debut professional debut followed two years later.

=== Cruz Azul ===
On 26 June 2023, Castaño joined Cruz Azul.

=== Krasnodar ===
On 5 January 2024, Castaño agreed on a transfer to the Russian club Krasnodar. Signing a contract until the summer of 2028 on 21 January 2024.

=== River Plate ===
On 12 March 2025, Castaño signed with River Plate in Argentina.

=== Atlético Mineiro ===
On 14 August 2026, Castaño joined Brazilian Série A club Atlético Mineiro on loan until June 2027.

== International career ==
Castano made his debut for the Colombia senior side in a friendly match against the United States on 28 January 2023. He was called up again to the Colombia squad for friendly matches against South Korea and Japan in March 2023.

He was again called up by Néstor Lorenzo for the 2024 Copa América, where Colombia finished as runners-up.

On 25 May 2026, he was named in head coach Néstor Lorenzo's final 26-man squad for the 2026 FIFA World Cup. He made his FIFA World Cup debut on 17 June in a 3–1 victory over Uzbekistan, coming on as a substitute for Jhon Arias in the closing minutes of the match.

== Personal life ==
His father Richard, with whom he would have training sessions as a youngster, was a big influence on his football career.

== Career statistics ==
=== Club ===
As of match played 19 September 2026

Appearances and goals by club, season and competition
Club	Season	League			Cup		Continental		Other		Total	
Club	Season	Division	Apps	Goals	Apps	Goals	Apps	Goals	Apps	Goals	Apps	Goals
Águilas Doradas	2020	Liga DIMAYOR	0	0	1	0	—		—		1	0
Águilas Doradas	2021	Liga DIMAYOR	23	0	2	0	—		—		25	0
Águilas Doradas	2022	Liga DIMAYOR	35	0	2	0	—		—		37	0
Águilas Doradas	2023	Liga DIMAYOR	17	2	0	0	1 (Note: Appearance(s) in Copa Sudamericana)	0	—		18	2
Águilas Doradas	Total		75	2	5	0	1	0	—		81	2
Cruz Azul	2023–24	Liga MX	13	0	0	0	—		2 (Note: Appearance(s) in Leagues Cup)	0	15	0
Krasnodar	2023–24	Russian Premier League	9	0	1	0	—		—		10	0
Krasnodar	2024–25	Russian Premier League	16	1	6	0	—		—		22	1
Krasnodar	Total		25	1	7	0	—		—		32	1
River Plate	2025	AFA Liga Profesional de Fútbol	22	0	4	0	10 (Note: Appearance(s) in Copa Libertadores)	0	2 (Note: Appearance(s) in FIFA Club World Cup)	0	38	0
River Plate	2026	AFA Liga Profesional de Fútbol	5	0	0	0	2	0	0	0	7	0
River Plate	Total		27	0	4	0	12	0	2	0	45	0
Atlético Mineiro (loan)	2026	Série A	5	0	2	0	2	0	—		9	0
Career total			145	3	18	0	15	0	4	0	185	3

=== International ===
As of match played 6 October 2026

Appearances and goals by national team and year
National team	Year	Apps	Goals
Colombia	2023	7	0
Colombia	2024	9	0
Colombia	2025	7	0
Colombia	2026	7	0
Total		30	0

== Honours ==
Krasnodar

- Russian Premier League: 2024–25

Colombia

- Copa América runner-up: 2024
