= Marcos Acuña =

Argentine footballer (born 1991)

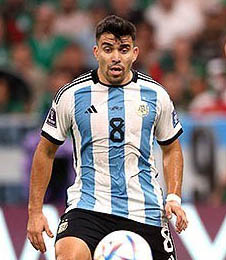
- Acuña playing for Argentina at the 2022 FIFA World Cup

Personal information
- Full name: Marcos Javier Acuña
- Date of birth: 28 October 1991 (age 35)
- Place of birth: Zapala, Neuquén, Argentina
- Height: 1.72 m (5 ft 8 in)
- Position: Left back

Team information
- Current team: River Plate
- Number: 21

Youth career
- Don Bosco de Zapala
- 2008–2010: Ferro Carril Oeste

Senior career*
Years	Team	Apps	(Gls)
2010–2014	Ferro Carril Oeste	113	(5)
2014–2017	Racing Club	78	(16)
2017–2020	Sporting CP	85	(7)
2020–2024	Sevilla	112	(6)
2024–	River Plate	59	(3)

International career^{‡}
2016–	Argentina	62	(0)
Medal record
Men's football
Representing Argentina
FIFA World Cup
Winner	2022 Qatar
Copa América
Winner	2021 Brazil
Winner	2024 United States
Third place	2019 Brazil
CONMEBOL–UEFA Cup of Champions
Winner	2022 England
- * Club domestic league appearances and goals as of 00:00, 11 October 2026 (UTC) ‡ National team caps and goals as of 03:33, 28 March 2026 (UTC)

Marcos Javier Acuña, nicknamed Huevo (lit. 'Egg'), (born 28 October 1991) is an Argentine professional footballer who plays as a left back for Argentine Primera División club River Plate and the Argentina national team.

He started his career at Ferro Carril Oeste in Argentina before moving to Racing Club. He moved to Europe in 2017 to play with Portuguese team Sporting CP before joining Spanish team Sevilla in 2020. He was named in the team of the year for the 2021–22 La Liga season. With Sevilla, he won the 2022–23 Europa League and was named in the competition's team of the season. He returned to Argentina in 2024, joining River Plate. He was part of the Argentina squads at the 2018 and 2022 World Cups, winning the 2022 edition. He was also part of the squads at the 2019, 2021, and 2024 Copa Américas, winning the latter two.

== Club career ==
=== Early career ===
Acuña began his athletic training at Club Don Bosco in his hometown. At that time he played as a left wing-back. His good performance got him noticed by scouts who invited him to perform tests at various clubs in Buenos Aires. Thus, at age 13 he tried out for but did not stay at Boca Juniors and San Lorenzo de Almagro. Four years later he tried out for Quilmes, River Plate and Tigre before ultimately being taken by Ferro Carril Oeste. After a few seasons in Ferro's reserve team, he was promoted to the first team. He made his debut in 2009 in a match in the Primera B Nacional playing as a winger under coach José María Bianco. Already in the 2013–14 season he stood out for his ability to assist his peers, providing 12 assists, which caught the attention of major clubs. At Ferro, Acuña played a total of 117 matches, with 5 goals and 23 assists.

=== Racing Club ===
On 18 July 2014, Acuña moved to Racing Club for a net fee of 4,900,000 pesos for 50% of his rights, with the option to buy another 25% at $750,000. On 27 July 2014, he played his first game with the Academia in a match for the knockout phase of the 2013–14 Copa Argentina against San Martín de San Juan, in which he also scored the winning goal on a header to give Racing a 1–0 victory. Later that year he was part of Racing's championship team that won the 2014 Argentine Primera División, cutting a streak of 13 years without titles for the Avellaneda side, in which Acuña played 15 games and scored two goals.

=== Sporting CP ===
On 12 June 2017, Racing president Víctor Blanco confirmed that Acuña would be leaving the club for Sporting CP. He made his debut for the Portuguese team in a 2–0 away victory over Desportivo Aves. On 15 May 2018, Acuña and several of his teammates, including coaches, were injured following an attack by around 50 supporters of Sporting at the club's training ground after the team finished third in the league and missed out on the UEFA Champions League qualification. Despite the attack, he and the rest of the team agreed to play in the Portuguese Cup final scheduled for the following weekend, eventually losing to C.D. Aves.

=== Sevilla ===
On 14 September 2020, Acuña joined Spanish club Sevilla on a four-year deal. On 7 November 2021, Acuña scored his first league goal of the 2021–22 season in the el gran derbi where Sevilla won 2–0 against Real Betis. On 13 February 2021, he extended his contract with Sevilla until 2025.

During Sevilla's match at Getafe on 30 March 2024, Acuña was the victim of racist chanting from behind the coaches' benches. As a result of this chanting, Getafe were ordered to close sections of their stadium for 3 matches.

=== River Plate ===
On August 18, Sevilla and River Plate began to negotiate Acuña's transfer. The operation was closed for just over three million euros to acquire 100% of the player's economical rights, with contract running until December 2027. On August 20, Acuña was officially presented as a River reinforcement.

== International career ==
On 15 November 2016, Acuña made his international debut with the Argentina national team in a 2018 World Cup qualifier match against Colombia. He was part of Argentina's squad that won the 2021 Copa América.

Acuña represented Argentina in the 2018 World Cup in Russia and the 2022 World Cup in Qatar. He won the latter edition of the tournament, playing all games except for the semifinal against Croatia in which he was suspended.

In June 2024, Acuña was included in Lionel Scaloni's final 26-man Argentina squad for the 2024 Copa América.

== Career statistics ==
=== Club ===
As of match played 24 November 2025

Appearances and goals by club, season and competition
Club	Season	League			National cup (Note: Includes Copa Argentina, Taça de Portugal, Copa del Rey)		League cup (Note: Includes Taça da Liga)		Continental		Other		Total	
Club	Season	Division	Apps	Goals	Apps	Goals	Apps	Goals	Apps	Goals	Apps	Goals	Apps	Goals
Ferro Carril Oeste	2010–11	Primera B	7	0	0	0	–		–		–		7	0
Ferro Carril Oeste	2011–12	Primera B	31	2	1	0	–		–		–		32	2
Ferro Carril Oeste	2012–13	Primera B	36	1	1	0	–		–		–		37	1
Ferro Carril Oeste	2013–14	Primera B	39	2	2	0	–		–		–		41	2
Ferro Carril Oeste	Total		113	5	4	0	–		–		–		117	5
Racing Club	2014	Argentine Primera División	16	2	2	1	–		–		–		18	3
Racing Club	2015	Argentine Primera División	27	4	3	0	–		9 (Note: Appearances in Copa Libertadores)	0	–		39	4
Racing Club	2016	Argentine Primera División	10	1	0	0	–		10	1	–		20	2
Racing Club	2016–17	Argentine Primera División	25	9	4	1	–		3 (Note: Appearances in Copa Sudamericana)	1	–		32	11
Racing Club	Total		78	16	9	2	–		22	2	–		109	20
Sporting CP	2017–18	Primeira Liga	31	4	5	0	5	1	13 (Note: Seven appearances and one goal in UEFA Champions League, six appearances in UEFA Europa League)	1	–		54	6
Sporting CP	2018–19	Primeira Liga	30	1	5	0	4	0	6 (Note: Appearances in UEFA Europa League)	0	–		45	1
Sporting CP	2019–20	Primeira Liga	24	2	0	0	4	0	6	0	1 (Note: Appearance in Supertaça Cândido de Oliveira)	0	35	2
Sporting CP	Total		85	7	10	0	13	1	25	1	1	0	134	9
Sevilla	2020–21	La Liga	30	1	3	0	–		4 (Note: Appearances in UEFA Champions League)	0	0	0	37	1
Sevilla	2021–22	La Liga	31	1	2	0	–		8 (Note: Five appearances in UEFA Champions League, three appearances in UEFA Europa League)	0	–		41	1
Sevilla	2022–23	La Liga	30	3	3	0	–		12 (Note: Four appearances in UEFA Champions League, eight appearances in UEFA Europa League)	0	–		45	3
Sevilla	2023–24	La Liga	21	1	1	0	–		3	0	1 (Note: Appearance in UEFA Super Cup)	0	26	1
Sevilla	Total		112	6	9	0	–		27	0	1	0	149	6
River Plate	2024	Argentine Primera División	11	0	0	0	–		3	0	–		14	0
River Plate	2025	Argentine Primera División	26	1	4	0	–		8	0	3 (Note: Appearances in FIFA Club World Cup)	0	41	1
River Plate	Total		37	1	4	0	–		11	0	3	0	55	1
Career total			425	35	36	2	13	1	85	3	5	0	564	41

=== International ===
As of match played 27 March 2026

Appearances and goals by national team and year
National team	Year	Apps	Goals
Argentina	2016	1	0
Argentina	2017	7	0
Argentina	2018	8	0
Argentina	2019	11	0
Argentina	2020	1	0
Argentina	2021	11	0
Argentina	2022	10	0
Argentina	2023	7	0
Argentina	2024	5	0
Argentina	2025	0	0
Argentina	2026	1	0
Total		62	0

== Honours ==
Racing Club

- Argentine Primera División: 2014

Sporting CP

- Taça de Portugal: 2018–19
- Taça da Liga: 2017–18, 2018–19

Sevilla

- UEFA Europa League: 2022–23

Argentina

- FIFA World Cup: 2022
- Copa América: 2021, 2024
- CONMEBOL–UEFA Cup of Champions: 2022

Individual

- Argentine Primera División top assist provider: 2016–17
- La Liga Team of the Season: 2021–22
- UEFA Europa League Team of the Season: 2022–23
