= Juan Portillo =

Argentine footballer (born 2000)

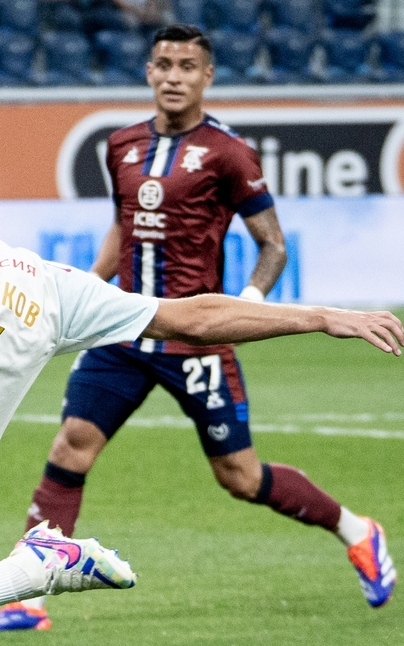

Personal information
- Full name: Juan Carlos Portillo
- Date of birth: 18 May 2000 (age 26)
- Place of birth: Puerto Rico, Argentina
- Positions: Centre-back; defensive midfielder

Team information
- Current team: River Plate
- Number: 5

Youth career
- 2015–2018: Crucero del Norte

Senior career*
Years	Team	Apps	(Gls)
2018–2020	Crucero del Norte	14	(0)
2019	→ Deportivo Itapuense (loan)		
2020–2023	Unión Santa Fe	69	(0)
2023–2025	Talleres	77	(1)
2025–	River Plate	13	(0)
- * Club domestic league appearances and goals as of 17:45, 10 July 2026 (UTC)

Juan Carlos Portillo (born 18 May 2000) is an Argentine professional footballer who plays as a centre-back or defensive midfielder Argentine Primera División club River Plate.

== Career ==
Portillo joined Crucero del Norte in 2015. He made his first-team breakthrough during the 2018–19 Torneo Federal A, making his debut off the bench on 2 December 2018 in a victory away to Altos Hornos Zapla. Portillo scored his first goal in his next appearance, netting in a Copa Argentina qualifying round first leg draw with San Martín de Formosa on 16 January 2019. Eight further appearances came up until March. Midway through the year, Portillo was loaned with three teammates to Paraguay with Primera División B Nacional side Deportivo Itapuense; an affiliate of Crucero's.

After appearing seven times back with Crucero in 2019–20, Portillo left permanently to join Primera División outfit Unión Santa Fe in July 2020. He scored in an October friendly match versus Newell's Old Boys. His first competitive appearance arrived on 28 November against Racing Club in the Copa de la Liga Profesional; replacing Kevin Zenón with seventeen minutes remaining.

In January 2023, Portillo moved to Talleres de Córdoba on a contract until the end of 2026. After a good first season, in which Portillo made 34 appearances, he signed a new contract in November 2023 until the end of 2027.

In July 2025, Portillo joined River Plate, signing a contract until the end of 2028.

== Career statistics ==
As of 29 November 2020.

Appearances and goals by club, season and competition
Club	Season	League			Cup		League Cup		Continental		Other		Total	
Club	Season	Division	Apps	Goals	Apps	Goals	Apps	Goals	Apps	Goals	Apps	Goals	Apps	Goals
Crucero del Norte	2018–19	Torneo Federal A	7	0	3	1	—		—		0	0	10	1
Crucero del Norte	2019–20	Torneo Federal A	7	0	0	0	—		—		0	0	7	0
Crucero del Norte	Total		14	0	3	1	—		—		0	0	17	1
Unión Santa Fe	2020–21 (Note: Soccerway counts Copa de la Liga Profesional appearances as league appearances.)	Primera División	1	0	0	0	0	0	0	0	0	0	1	0
Career total			15	0	3	1	0	0	0	0	0	0	18	1
