= Lucas Lavagnino =

Argentine footballer (born 2004)

Personal information
- Full name: Lucas Ignacio Lavagnino
- Date of birth: 22 August 2004 (age 22)
- Place of birth: Buenos Aires, Argentina
- Height: 1.89 m (6 ft 2 in)
- Position: Goalkeeper

Team information
- Current team: Valladolid

Youth career
- Leloir
- Argentinos Juniors
- 2014–2025: River Plate

Senior career*
Years	Team	Apps	(Gls)
2025–2026	River Plate	0	(0)
2025–2026	→ Independiente (loan)	0	(0)
2026–	Valladolid	0	(0)

International career
2023	Argentina U20	1	(0)
- * Club domestic league appearances and goals as of 00:02, 6 August 2026 (UTC)

Lucas Ignacio Lavagnino (born 22 August 2004) is an Argentine professional footballer as a goalkeeper for Segunda División club Valladolid.

== Early life ==
Born in Palermo, Buenos Aires, Lavagnino began his career with Club Leloir as a forward, but later moved to the goalkeeper position before joining the youth categories of Argentinos Juniors. In 2014, he joined River Plate after a trial period, and started to feature with the club's reserve team in 2022.

== Club career ==
=== River Plate ===
In March 2023, Lavagnino signed a professional contract with River until December 2025. In July, he was called up to the first team by manager Martín Demichelis for a match against Rosario Central, but remained an unused substitute in the 3–3 draw. In August, he further extended his link until 2026.

Lavagnino shared the starting spot with Santiago Beltrán in the reserves during the 2024 season, with both acting as backups to Franco Armani and Ezequiel Centurión in the main squad. He was also a member of the club's squad for the 2025 FIFA Club World Cup.

==== Loan to Independiente ====
On 24 July 2025, Lavagnino was announced at Independiente on an 18-month loan deal, with a buyout clause. In his new club, however, he acted as third-choice behind Rodrigo Rey and Joaquín Blázquez, only playing for the reserves, and terminated his loan in July 2026. Shortly after leaving Independiente, he also rescinded his contract with River on 27 July.

=== Valladolid ===
On 7 August 2026, Segunda División side Valladolid announced the signing of Lagagnino on a two-year deal.

== International career ==
In April 2023, Lavagnino was called up to the Argentina national under-20 team for a period of trainings aiming the 2023 FIFA U-20 World Cup. He was included in Javier Mascherano's final squad for the tournament in May, and despite playing in a friendly against Japan before the start of the competition, he acted as a backup to Federico Gomes Gerth as Argentina were eliminated in the round of 16.
