= Lautaro Rivero =

Argentine footballer (born 2003)

Personal information
- Full name: Lautaro Ruben Rivero Cruz
- Date of birth: 1 November 2003 (age 23)
- Place of birth: Buenos Aires, Argentina
- Position: Centre-back

Team information
- Current team: River Plate
- Number: 13

Youth career
- 2018–2024: River Plate

Senior career*
Years	Team	Apps	(Gls)
2024–	River Plate	33	(2)
2024–2025	→ Central Córdoba (loan)	22	(2)

International career^{‡}
2025	Argentina	1	(0)
- * Club domestic league appearances and goals as of 17:21, 27 May 2026 (UTC) ‡ National team caps and goals as of 15 October 2025

Lautaro Ruben Rivero Cruz (born 1 November 2003) is an Argentine professional footballer who plays as a centre-back for Argentine Primera División club River Plate.

== Club career ==
A left-footed central defender, he is a product of the youth academy at River Plate, where he captained the River Plate reserve side. He played on loan at Argentine Primera División side Central Córdoba de Santiago del Estero in 2024, initially agreeing to a move for 18 months. His performances for the club included six in the Copa Libertadores, and thirty appearances in all competitions. His loan was ended early by River Plate, prior to their engagement in the 2025 FIFA Club World Cup in June 2025, after only a year.

Returning to River Plate, he signed a new three-year contract in July 2025. He became a first team player after making his debut for the club in a 0–0 draw against Independiente on 9 August, and started five of River's next ten league games.

== International career ==
He was called up to the senior Argentina team for their friendly matches against Venezuela and Puerto Rico in October 2025, making his senior international debut as a substitute on 14 October 2025 in Argentina's 6–0 win over Puerto Rico.

== Honours ==
Central Córdoba

- Copa Argentina: 2024
