= Santiago Lencina =

Argentine footballer (born 2005)

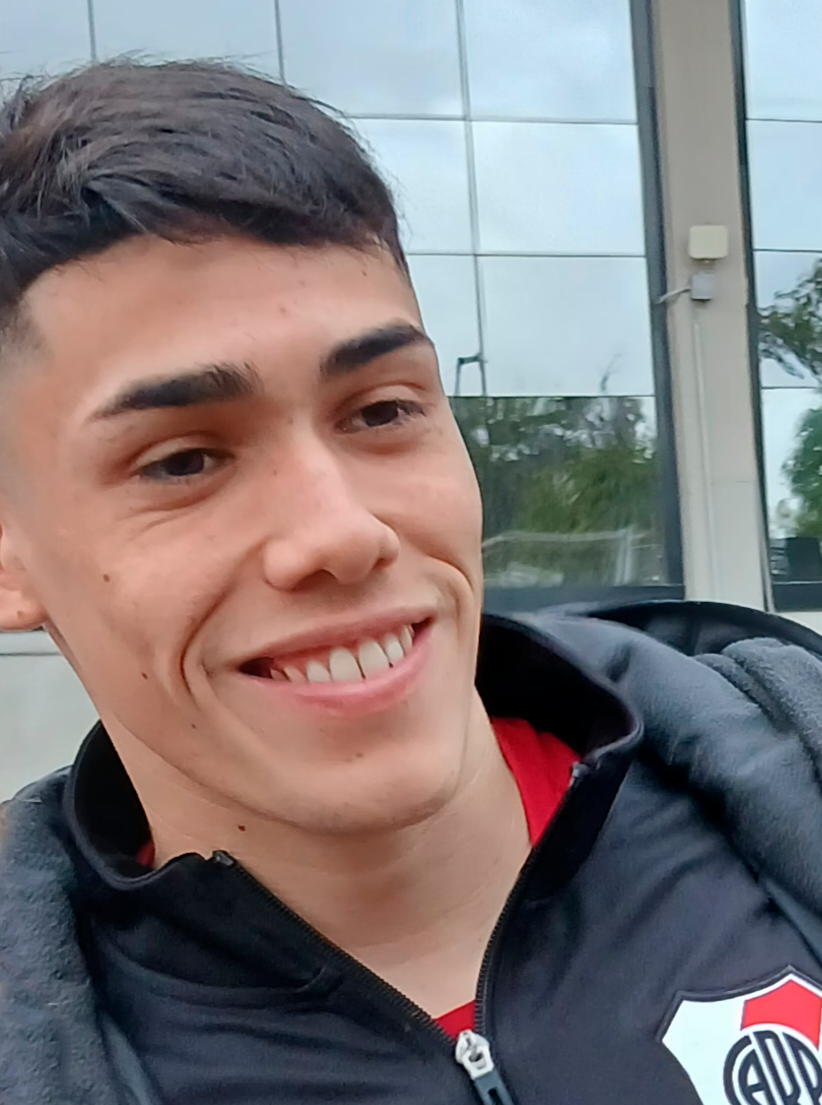
- Lencina in 2025

Personal information
- Full name: Santiago Javier Lencina
- Date of birth: 4 September 2005 (age 21)
- Place of birth: Corzuela, Argentina
- Height: 1.72 m (5 ft 7 1/2 in)
- Position: Attacking midfielder

Team information
- Current team: Burgos (on loan from River Plate)
- Number: 24

Youth career
- Obreros Unidos
- 2018–2025: River Plate

Senior career*
Years	Team	Apps	(Gls)
2024–	River Plate	20	(3)
2026–	→ Burgos (loan)	7	(0)

International career
2025	Argentina U20	3	(0)
- * Club domestic league appearances and goals as of 22:00, 22 November 2026 (UTC)

Santiago Javier Lencina (born 4 September 2005) is an Argentine professional association football player who plays as an attacking midfielder for Segunda División club Burgos, on loan from Argentine Primera División club River Plate.

== Club career ==
=== Early career ===
Lencina was born in Corzuela, and started playing football at a local club called Club Atlético Deportivo Obreros Unidos before arriving at River Plate's academy in 2018, after a trial period led by ex-player Alejandro Montenegro. He ascended towards the reserves of River Plate, where he made 49 appearances with 9 goals scored.

=== River Plate ===
Lencina made his professional debut on 4 August 2024 in a 1–1 draw against Unión de Santa Fe, under the leadership of Marcelo Escudero, the temporary manager after manager Martín Demichelis got sacked. He wouldn't get many chances on the team until the return of Marcelo Gallardo, where he got called up for the 2025 FIFA Club World Cup, although he didn't play a single match. In the league, he played in the first match of the Torneo Clausura, in a 3–1 win against reigning champions Platense. After this, Lencina got in the starting XI again versus Instituto, where he scored two goals, scoring for the first time a professional goal. He has a contract with the club until December 2028 and a release clause of 100 million euros.

==== Loan to Burgos ====
On 6 August 2026, Segunda División side Burgos announced the signing of Lencina on a one-year loan deal, with a buyout clause.

== International career ==
While still on the River Plate reserves, Javier Mascherano, coach of the Argentinian U20, was impressed by his performance and had called him up to play for the U20, in three friendlies against Paraguay.

== Style of play ==
Lencina is described as a left-footed attacking midfielder.

== Career statistics ==
=== Club ===
As of match played 12 October 2025

Appearances and goals by club, season and competition
Club	Season	League			National cup (Note: Includes Copa Argentina, Supercopa Argentina, Supercopa Internacional)		League cup (Note: Includes Copa de la Liga Profesional, Trofeo de Campeones de la Liga Profesional)		Continental		Other		Total	
Club	Season	Division	Apps	Goals	Apps	Goals	Apps	Goals	Apps	Goals	Apps	Goals	Apps	Goals
River Plate	2023-24	Primera División	1	0	0	0	0	0	0	0	0	0	1	0
River Plate	2024-25	Primera División	3	3	1	0	0	0	1	0	0	0	4	2
River Plate	Total		0	0	0	0	0	0	0	0	0	0	5	3
Career total			4	2	1	0	0	0	1	0	0	0	8	2
