= Santiago Simón =

Argentine footballer (born 2002)

Personal information
- Date of birth: 13 June 2002 (age 24)
- Place of birth: José C. Paz, Argentina
- Height: 1.81 m (5 ft 11 in)
- Position: Winger

Team information
- Current team: Toluca
- Number: 19

Youth career
- 2006–2013: Cooperativa Tortuguitas
- 2013–2020: River Plate

Senior career*
Years	Team	Apps	(Gls)
2020–2025	River Plate	101	(2)
2025–	Toluca	11	(0)

International career^{‡}
2018–2019	Argentina U17	6	(0)
2026–	Argentina	1	(0)
- * Club domestic league appearances and goals as of 14 January 2026 ‡ National team caps and goals as of 30 September 2026

Santiago Simón (born 13 June 2002) is an Argentine professional footballer who plays as a winger for Liga MX club Toluca and the Argentina national team.

== Club career ==
Simón started playing football at the age of four at Cooperativa Tortuguitas. He joined River Plate's academy in 2013, following a week-long trial. He spent seven years in their system, notably moving into the reserve squad in February 2020; debuting versus Banfield on 14 February. Nine months later, on 20 November, Simón was promoted into Marcelo Gallardo's senior squad for a Copa de la Liga Profesional match with the aforementioned Banfield. His debut subsequently arrived, with the winger replacing Cristian Ferreira for the final seventeen minutes of a 2–0 away win.

On 16 August 2025, Simon joined Mexican club Toluca.

== International career ==
Simón represented Argentina at U17 level. After featuring in an October 2018 friendly against their United States counterparts, Simón was selected by Pablo Aimar for the 2019 South American U-17 Championship, which they won, and the subsequent 2019 FIFA U-17 World Cup; appearing a total of five times across both competitions.

On 30 September 2026, Simón made his debut with the Argentina national team in a 4–0 friendly win against Bolivia.

== Career statistics ==
=== Club ===
As of 5 January 2021

Appearances and goals by club, season and competition
Club	Season	League			National cup		League cup		Continental		Other		Total	
Club	Season	Division	Apps	Goals	Apps	Goals	Apps	Goals	Apps	Goals	Apps	Goals	Apps	Goals
River Plate	2020–21 (Note: Soccerway counts Copa de la Liga Profesional appearances as league appearances.)	Argentine Primera División	2	0	0	0	0	0	0	0	0	0	2	0
Career total			2	0	0	0	0	0	0	0	0	0	2	0

== Honours ==
River Plate

- Argentine Primera División: 2021, 2023
- Trofeo de Campeones de la Liga Profesional: 2021, 2023
- Supercopa Argentina: 2023

Toluca

- Liga MX: Apertura 2025
- Campeones Cup: 2025
- CONCACAF Champions Cup: 2026
- Leagues Cup: 2026

Argentina U17

- South American U-17 Championship: 2019
