= Ulises Giménez =

Argentine footballer (born 2006)

Personal information
- Full name: Ulises Adrián Giménez
- Date of birth: 1 January 2006 (age 20)
- Place of birth: José C. Paz, Buenos Aires, Argentina
- Height: 1.85 m (6 ft 1 in)
- Positions: Central defender; right-back

Team information
- Current team: Sarmiento (on loan from River Plate)

Youth career
- San Luis
- 2012: Los Latinos
- 2012–2026: River Plate

Senior career*
Years	Team	Apps	(Gls)
2025–	River Plate	1	(0)
2024	→ Defensa y Justicia (loan)	0	(0)
2026–	→ Sarmiento (loan)	11	(0)

International career^{‡}
2022–2023	Argentina U17	22	(0)
- * Club domestic league appearances and goals as of 18:10, 10 November 2026 (UTC) ‡ National team caps and goals as of 1 December 2023

Ulises Adrián Giménez (born 1 January 2006) is an Argentine footballer who plays as a defender for Argentine Primera Division club Sarmiento, on loan from River Plate.

== Early life ==
Giménez was born in José C. Paz in the Buenos Aires Province of Argentina. Hailing from a footballing family, his grandfather Hugo played for Deportivo Español during their time in the Primera División, while his father Adrián played for Ferro and his uncle represented Fénix.

== Club career ==
Giménez began his career with local side San Luis, before joining another youth side named Los Latinos in 2012. Later in the same year, he was invited to trial with professional side River Plate. He began the trial on a Tuesday, and by the Thursday of the same week, the club offered him a place in their academy. His progression through the academy was stifled due to the COVID-19 pandemic in Argentina, as all footballing activity was postponed shortly after he made the jump from children's football to youth.

The 2022 campaign was a very good one for Giménez; having started the year in River Plate's youth team, he was promoted to the next youth team, playing with players older than himself. Having continued to impress, he was promoted again to the club's reserve team, making his debut in August. In December of the same year, he trained with the first team under coach Martín Demichelis for the first time.

The following month, he was included in Demichelis' squad for River Plate's pre-season tour in Orlando, Florida in the United States. However, due to issues with his visa, he was unable to travel with the rest of the squad. Despite this setback, he signed his first professional contract early in 2023, tying him to River Plate until December 2025.

== International career ==
Having represented the Argentina under-17 team since 2022, Giménez was called up to the squad for the 2023 South American U-17 Championship, serving as captain as Argentina finished the competition in third place.
