= Santiago Beltrán =

Argentine footballer (born 2004)

- Beltrán in 2025.

Personal information
- Date of birth: 4 October 2004 (age 22)
- Place of birth: Buenos Aires, Argentina
- Height: 1.90 m (6 ft 3 in)
- Position: Goalkeeper

Team information
- Current team: River Plate
- Number: 41

Youth career
- 2022–2025: River Plate

Senior career*
Years	Team	Apps	(Gls)
2026–	River Plate	36	(0)

International career^{‡}
2026–	Argentina	1	(0)
- * Club domestic league appearances and goals as of 5 November 2026 ‡ National team caps and goals as of 6 June 2026

Santiago Beltrán (born 4 October 2004) is an Argentine professional association football player who plays as a goalkeeper for Argentine Primera División club River Plate and the Argentina national team.

== Club career ==
=== Early career ===
Beltrán arrived at River Plate at 17 years old with no prior experience at for any club affiliated with the AFA. He played firstly in his college as forward and then amateur football for Club de Campo Pueyrredón in Pilar Partido as goalkeeper.

=== River Plate ===
At the beginning of 2023 he signed his first professional contract with River Plate for three years and later extended it until December 2027, with a release clause of 25 million dollars.

He began training with the senior team during the 2024 season. That same year, he was named on the substitutes’ bench in a match against Deportivo Riestra. However, in September of that year, he suffered a knee injury that kept him out of competitive activity for approximately eight months. Beltrán also played a few minutes in a friendly match against Millonarios under the technical direction of Martín Demichelis.

In 2025, he was again called up to the first team for three matches. These included two for the Copa Libertadores: one against Libertad in the Round of 16 and another against Palmeiras in the quarterfinals. Later, he was called up to the Argentina national team to serve as a sparring partner in training sessions.

He began 2026 as the third-choice goalkeeper for the professional squad and featured in the 2026 Río de la Plata Series friendlies due to injuries to Franco Armani and Ezequiel Centurión. He made his official debut as the starting goalkeeper on January 24 against Barracas Central.

== International career ==
Beltrán was called up by Lionel Scaloni in October 2025 to be a sparring for the Argentina national team during the friendlies against Venezuela and Puerto Rico. Then, Beltrán was formally included in the preliminary squad list for the 2026 FIFA World Cup and called up for the friendlies against Honduras and Iceland.

Beltrán made his debut for Argentina on 6 June 2026 during the 2–0 victory against Honduras, replacing Juan Musso at the 81st minute.

== Career statistics ==
=== Club ===
As of match played 5 November 2026

Appearances and goals by club, season and competition
Club	Season	League			Cup (Note: Includes Copa Argentina)		Continental		Total	
Club	Season	Division	Apps	Goals	Apps	Goals	Apps	Goals	Apps	Goals
River Plate	2026	Primera División	36	0	2	0	7 (Note: Appearances in Copa Sudamericana)	0	45	0
Career total			36	0	2	0	7	0	45	0

=== International ===
As of match played 6 June 2026

Appearances and goals by national team and year
National team	Year	Apps	Goals
Argentina	2026	1	0
Total		1	0
