= Facundo Colidio =

Argentine footballer (born 2000)

Personal information
- Date of birth: 4 January 2000 (age 26)
- Place of birth: Rafaela, Argentina
- Height: 1.82 m (6 ft 0 in)
- Position: Forward

Team information
- Current team: Vasco da Gama
- Number: 9

Youth career
- 2013–2014: Atlético de Rafaela
- 2014–2017: Boca Juniors
- 2017–2019: Inter Milan

Senior career*
Years	Team	Apps	(Gls)
2018–2023	Inter Milan	0	(0)
2019–2021	→ Sint-Truiden (loan)	43	(3)
2022–2023	→ Tigre (loan)	63	(9)
2023–2026	River Plate	51	(24)
2026–	Vasco da Gama	2	(1)

International career
2017	Argentina U17	4	(2)
2018–2019	Argentina U20	8	(2)
- * Club domestic league appearances and goals as of 17:50, 10 July 2026 (UTC)

Facundo Colidio (born 4 January 2000) is an Argentine professional footballer who plays as a forward for Campeonato Brasileiro Série A club Vasco da Gama.

== Club career ==
He made his professional debut on 5 October 2019, replacing Alexandre De Bruyn for the last 13 minutes of a 4–0 loss at K.V. Kortrijk in Belgian First Division A match.

On 4 January 2022, he was loaned to Tigre until 31 December 2022.

In September 2026, Colidio joined the Brazilian side Vasco da Gama until December 2029. However, Colidio cannot be registered to play in the 2026 Copa Sudamericana for the new club, as he had already been registered in the knockout stages for River Plate. On 16 August, he made his debut as a starter against Santos. On 23 August, he scored his first goal in a 4–1 defeat to Palmeiras. On 19 September, Colidio opened the scoring in the 5–0 win over Coritiba.

== Personal life ==
Colidio also possesses an Italian passport.

== Honours ==
River Plate

- Trofeo de Campeones: 2023
- Supercopa Argentina: 2023
