= Rodríguez (surname) =

Origin
- Language: Spanish
- Meaning: Son of Rodrigo
- Region of origin: Spain

Other names
- Variant forms: Rodigrue, Rodriques, Roderickson

Rodríguez (pronounced [roˈðɾiɣeθ], [roˈðɾiɣes]) is a Spanish-language patronymic surname of Visigothic origin (meaning literally Son of Rodrigo; Germanic: Roderickson) and a common surname in Spain and Latin America. Its Portuguese equivalent is Rodrigues.

The "ez" signifies "son of". The name Rodrigo is the Spanish form of the German name Roderich, meaning "rich in fame", from the Gothic elements "hrod" (fame or glory) and "ric" (rich). It was the name of Roderic, the last Visigothic King before the Muslim conquest, and the subject of many legends. The surname Rodríguez could have originated in the 9th century when patronymic names originated.

In Belgium the House of Rodriguez d'Evora y Vega was for generations Great Breadmaster of Flanders, see: Marquess of Rode.

== Geographical distribution ==
As of 2014, 25.9% of all known bearers of the surname Rodríguez were residents of Mexico (frequency 1:52), 10.3% of Spain (1:49), 9.8% of Colombia (1:53), 9.2% of the United States (1:426), 8.4% of Venezuela (1:39), 5.9% of Cuba (1:21), 5.9% of Argentina (1:79), 3.2% of Peru (1:108), 2.7% of the Dominican Republic (1:41), 2.2% of Honduras (1:43), 1.6% of Ecuador (1:107), 1.6% of Panama (1:27), 1.6% of the Philippines (1:708), 1.3% of Bolivia (1:87), 1.3% of Chile (1:146), 1.3% of Guatemala (1:135), 1.2% of El Salvador (1:58), 1.2% of Costa Rica (1:44), 1.2% of Uruguay (1:32), 1.1% of Puerto Rico (1:35), and 1.1% of Nicaragua (1:60).

In Spain, the frequency of the surname was higher than national average (1:49) in the following regions:

- 1. Canary Islands (1:21)
- 2. Galicia (1:24)
- 3. Asturias (1:26)
- 4. Castile and León (1:39)
- 5. Andalusia (1:40)
- 6. Extremadura (1:41)

In Cuba, the frequency of the surname was higher than national average (1:21) in the following provinces:

- 1. Ciego de Ávila (1:15)
- 2. Sancti Spíritus (1:18)
- 3. Cienfuegos (1:18)
- 4. Holguín (1:18)
- 5. Artemisa (1:18)
- 6. Granma (1:18)
- 7. Santiago de Cuba (1:20)
- 8. Villa Clara (1:20)
- 9. Matanzas (1:20)
- 10. Las Tunas (1:21)

In Mexico, the frequency of the surname was higher than national average (1:52) in the following states:

- 1. Nuevo León (1:29)
- 2. Coahuila (1:30)
- 3. Zacatecas (1:32)
- 4. San Luis Potosí (1:34)
- 5. Aguascalientes (1:35)
- 6. Guanajuato (1:36)
- 7. Tamaulipas (1:37)
- 8. Durango (1:38)
- 9. Nayarit (1:41)
- 10. Jalisco (1:43)
- 11. Colima (1:44)
- 12. Chihuahua (1:44)
- 13. Tlaxcala (1:49)
- 14. Baja California (1:50)

== People ==
Notable people with the surname include:

=== General ===
- Georgina Rodríguez (born 1994), Argentine-Spanish social media personality, model and entrepreneur
- Gustavo Rodríguez Vega (born 1955), Mexican archbishop
- Helen Rodríguez Trías (1929–2001), American pediatrician, educator and women's rights activist
- Jana Rodriguez Hertz (born 1970), Argentine and Uruguayan mathematician
- Jessamyn Rodriguez (born 1976), Canadian-American social entrepreneur
- Jesusa Rodríguez (born 1955), Mexican theater director, actress, performance artist, social activist and elected Senator of the Morena party
- José Luis Rodríguez, El Puma, Venezuelan singer and actor
- Juan Campos Rodríguez (1907–1995), Spanish Redemptorist missionary
- Junius P. Rodriguez (born 1957), United States academic and historian
- Katya Rodríguez-Vázquez, Mexican computer scientist
- Lily O. Rodríguez, Peruvian ecologist
- Luis Rodríguez Zúñiga (1942–1991), Spanish sociologist
- María Fernanda Rodríguez, Venezuelan professor and activist
- Monique Rodriguez, American entrepreneur and CEO
- Narciso Rodriguez (born 1961), American fashion designer
- Robyn Rodriguez, Filipino American academic
- Rubí Rodríguez, Chilean mathematician
- Simón Rodríguez (1769–1854), Venezuelan philosopher and educator
- Sonia Rodriguez (born 1972), Canadian ballet dancer
- Tina Rodriguez (died 1986), American murder victim
- Vance Rodriguez (1976–2018), Hiker who was found dead in Florida in 2018
- Ventura Rodríguez (1717–1785), Spanish architect
- Verneda Rodriguez (1918–1982), American aviator

=== Artists ===
- Diego Rodríguez de Silva y Velásquez (1599–1660), Velásquez, Spanish painter
- Freddy Rodríguez (artist) (1945–2022), American artist
- Nereyda Rodríguez (1931– 2011), Dominican folklorist and dancer
- Zhandra Rodríguez (born 1947), Venezuelan ballet dancer

=== Writers, journalists ===
- Abraham Rodriguez (born 1961), Puerto Rican novelist
- Emir Rodríguez Monegal (1921–1985), Uruguayan literary critic, editor, writer
- Fátima Rodríguez (born 1961), Spanish writer, translator, professor
- José Luis Rodríguez Pittí (born 1971), Panamanian writer and artist
- Luis J. Rodriguez (born 1954), American writer
- Mario Rodríguez Cobos (1938–2010), Argentine philosopher, author and nonviolence advocate
- Ozzie Rodriguez (1944–2025), American playwright, actor, director, visual artist, and archivist
- Silvia Rodríguez Villamil (1939–2003), Uruguayan historian, feminist, writer, activist

=== Explorers ===
- Juan Rodríguez Cabrillo (1497–1543), Spanish navigator

=== Science ===
- Josep Maria Trigo Rodríguez (born 1970), Spanish astronomer and astrophysicist

=== Film and television ===
- Adam Rodriguez (born 1975), American actor, screenwriter and director
- Adrián Rodríguez (born 1988), Spanish actor and singer
- Anabel Rodríguez Ríos (born 1977), Venezuelan film director and screenwriter
- Elizabeth Rodriguez (born 1980), American actress
- Endre Rodríguez (1899–1975), Hungarian film director
- Freddy Rodriguez (actor) (born 1975), Puerto Rican-American actor
- Gina Rodriguez (born 1984), American actress
- James Roday Rodriguez (born 1976) American actor
- Jai Rodriguez (born 1979), American actor
- Jeanette Rodriguez (born 1990), Venezuelan actress
- Lee Rodriguez (born 1999), American actress
- Lina Rodriguez, Colombian-Canadian filmmaker and screenwriter
- Marcos A. Rodriguez (born 1958), Cuban-American entrepreneur and movie producer
- Mariel Rodriguez (born 1984), Filipina actress and T.V. host
- Mel Rodriguez (born 1973), American actor
- Michelle Rodriguez (born 1978), American actress
- Raini Rodriguez (born 1993), US television actress, older sister of Rico Rodriguez
- Rico Rodriguez (actor) (born 1998), US television actor, younger brother of Raini Rodriguez
- Robert Rodriguez (born 1968) American film director
- Vincent Rodriguez III (born 1982), American actor

=== Music ===
- Adrian Rodriguez (DJ), German trance producer and DJ, also known by his mononym Rodriguez
- Adrián Rodríguez (born 1988), Spanish actor and singer
- Albita Rodríguez (born 1962), United States singer
- Carrie Rodriguez (born 1978), United States singer-songwriter
- Chris Rodriguez (born 1960), American Contemporary Christian musician and singer-songwriter
- Daniel Rodríguez (born 1964), United States tenor
- David Rodriguez (singer-songwriter) (1952–2015), United States singer-songwriter
- Felipe Rodríguez (composer) (1760–1815), Spanish classical era composer
- Felipe Rodríguez (singer) (1926–1999), Puerto Rican singer
- Gerardo Matos Rodríguez (1897–1948), Uruguayan composer
- Johnny Rodriguez (1951–2025), United States country singer
- José Luis Rodríguez Vélez (1915–1984), Panamanian composer, director, clarinetist, educator
- José Luis Rodríguez (singer) (born 1943, "El Puma"), Venezuelan singer and actor
- Leo Rodriguez (singer) (born 1989), Brazilian Sertanejo music singer, songwriter
- Luis Alfonso Rodríguez López-Cepero (born 1978), Puerto Rican singer, songwriter and actor better known by his stage name Luis Fonsi
- Marcos Rodriguez, part of the Spanish DJ production / singing duo Magan & Rodriguez. He is also known by his mononym Rodriguez
- Martínez Rodríguez, Cuban vocalist and featured artist
- Maxime Rodriguez (born 1975), French composer
- Mia Rodriguez (born 2002), Australian singer-songwriter
- Omar Rodríguez-López (born 1975), United States composer
- Ramón "Raymond" Luis Ayala Rodríguez, known as Daddy Yankee (born 1977), Puerto Rican rapper
- Rico Rodriguez (1934–2015), trombonist
- Silvio Rodríguez (born 1946), Cuban singer-songwriter
- Sixto Rodriguez (1942–2023), United States singer, known in his recordings as Rodriguez

=== Politics ===
- Abelardo L. Rodríguez (1889–1967), President of Mexico
- Adelina Santos Rodriguez (1920–2021), Filipino politician
- Alejandro Encinas Rodríguez (born 1954), Mexican politician
- Alfonso Daniel Rodríguez Castelao (1886–1950), Spanish writer and politician
- Antonio Rodríguez San Juan (born 1957), Venezuela politician
- Carmen Rodríguez (politician) (born 1949), Bolivian politician
- Carolyn Jane Rodriguez (1944–2002), American politician
- Cayetano José Rodríguez (c. 1761–1823), Argentine politician
- Celeste Rodriguez (born 1990), American politician
- Charlie Rodríguez (born 1954), Puerto Rican politician
- Claudia Rodríguez de Guevara, (born 1980/1981) Acting President of El Salvador
- Delcy Rodríguez (born 1969), Venezuelan lawyer, diplomat, and politician, acting president of Venezuela since 2026
- Eduardo Rodríguez (born 1971), former president of Bolivia
- Eugene Rodriguez (1929–1999), New York politician
- Eulogio Rodriguez (1883–1964), Filipino politician
- Frank J. Rodriguez Sr. (1920–2007), American politician
- Héctor Rodríguez (born 1982), Venezuelan politician
- Horacio Rodríguez Larreta (born 1965), Argentine politician
- Isaías Rodríguez (1942–2025), Venezuelan politician, diplomat and lawyer
- Isidro Rodriguez (politician) (1915–1992), Filipino politician and softball official
- Jessie Rodriguez (born 1977), American politician
- Jesús Kumate Rodríguez (1924–2018), Mexican physician and politician
- Jorge Rodríguez (born 1965), Venezuelan politician
- José Luis Rodríguez Zapatero (born 1960), Spanish politician
- Liza Fernández Rodríguez (born 1973), Puerto Rican attorney and politician
- Manuel Rodríguez Erdoíza (1785–1818), Chilean lawyer and guerrilla leader, considered one of the founders of independent Chile
- Mariano Ospina Rodríguez (1805–1885), Colombian politician
- Miguel Ángel Rodríguez (born 1940), Costa Rican politician
- Nicolás Rodríguez Carrasco (c. 1890–1940), Mexican general
- Nicolás Rodríguez Peña (1775–1853), Argentine politician
- Nosliw Rodríguez (born 1988), Venezuelan politician
- Oscar Samson Rodriguez (born 1945), Filipino lawyer and politician
- Rufus Rodriguez (born 1953), Filipino politician
- William E. Rodriguez (1879–1970), Socialist Chicago City Council member and lawyer
- Ydanis Rodríguez (born 1965), Democratic New York City Council member
- Yolexis Rodríguez Armada (born 1971), Cuban politician

=== Sports ===
- Ademar Rodríguez (born 1990), Mexican footballer
- Alberto Rodríguez Larreta (1934–1977), Argentine racing driver
- Alex Rodriguez (born 1975), American baseball player
- Amy Rodriguez (born 1987), American soccer player
- Ángel Rodríguez (born 1992), Puerto Rican basketball player
- Arturo Rodríguez (boxer) (1907–1982), Argentine boxer and rugby union player
- Arturo Rodríguez (footballer, born 1989), Spanish footballer
- Arturo Rodríguez (footballer, born 1990), Mexican footballer
- Arturo Rodríguez (footballer, born 1998), Mexican footballer
- Arturo Rodríguez (footballer, born 2006), Spanish footballer
- Bradgley Rodríguez (born 2003), Venezuelan baseball player
- Carlos Rodríguez (born 1997), Mexican Football Player
- Carlos Rodriguez (born 2001), Spanish cyclist
- Carlos Rodríguez (born 2001), Nicaraguan baseball player
- Chi-Chi Rodríguez (1935–2024), Puerto Rican professional golfer
- Chris Rodriguez Jr. (born 2000), American football player
- Cinta Rodríguez (born 1999), Spanish footballer
- Clemente Rodríguez (born 1981), Argentine football player
- Cosiri Rodríguez (born 1977), Dominican volleyball player
- Cristian Rodríguez (boxer) (born 1973), Argentine boxer
- Dalidaivis Rodriguez Clark (born 1983), Cuban judoka
- Damian Rodriguez, Uruguayan football player
- Dereck Rodríguez (born 1992), American baseball player
- Desi Rodriguez (born 1996), American basketball player
- Douglas Rodríguez (boxer) (1950–2012), Cuban boxer
- Eddy Rodríguez (catcher) (born 1985), Cuban-American baseball player and coach
- Edemir Rodríguez (born 1986), Bolivian football player
- Eduardo Rodríguez (left-handed pitcher) (born 1993), Venezuelan baseball player
- Ellie Rodríguez (born 1946), Puerto Rican baseball player
- Elmer Rodríguez (born 2003), Puerto Rican baseball player
- Elvin Rodríguez (born 1998), Dominican baseball player
- Emanuel Rodriguez (born 1986), Mexican-American professional wrestler
- Emiliano Rodríguez (born 1937), Spanish basketball player
- Endy Rodríguez (born 2000), Dominican baseball player
- Ernesto Rodríguez (born 1969), Spanish volleyball player
- Eugene A. Rodriguez (1916–1996), Cuban-born American jockey
- Evan Rodriguez (born 1988), American football player
- Francisco Rodríguez (born 1982), Venezuelan baseball pitcher
- Freddy Rodríguez (baseball) (1924–2009), former pitcher in Major League Baseball
- Grayson Rodriguez (born 1999), American baseball player
- Gregorio Rodríguez (footballer) (born 2000), Argentine footballer
- Guido Rodríguez (born 1994), Argentine football player
- Hernán Rodríguez (1933–2026), Chilean footballer
- Ignacio Rodríguez (footballer, born 2002), Argentine footballer
- Isidro Rodríguez (footballer), Spanish footballer
- Iván Rodríguez (born 1971), also known as "Pudge" Rodríguez, Puerto Rican baseball player
- Jacob Rodriguez (born 2002), American football player
- James Rodríguez (born 1991), Colombian football player
- Jay Rodriguez (born 1989), English footballer
- Jefry Rodríguez (born 1993), Dominican baseball player
- Jemimah Rodrigues (born 2000), Indian women Cricketer
- Jennifer Rodriguez (born 1976), American speed skater
- Jesse Rodríguez (born 2000), American professional boxer
- Joaquim Rodríguez (born 1979), Spanish cyclist
- Joaquín Rodríguez Ortega (1903–1984), known as "Cagancho", Spanish bullfighter
- Joely Rodríguez (born 1991), Dominican baseball pitcher for the New York Mets
- Johnathan Rodríguez (born 1999), Puerto Rican baseball player
- Julio Rodríguez (born 2000), Dominican professional baseball outfielder
- Kevin Kuranyi Rodríguez (born 1982), German footballer
- Laurent Rodriguez (born 1960), French rugby union player and coach
- Levi Drake Rodriguez (born 2000), American football player
- Luis Rodríguez (volleyball) (born 1969), Puerto Rican volleyball player
- Malcolm Rodriguez (born 1999), American football player
- Manuel Rodríguez (pitcher) (born 1996), Mexican baseball player
- María Luisa Cuevas Rodríguez (born 1965), Spanish chess master
- Marvin Rodríguez (1934–2017), Costa Rican football player
- Maxi Rodríguez (born 1981), Argentine football player
- Melania Rodríguez (born 2001), Spanish trampolinist
- Michael Rodríguez (footballer) (born 1981), footballer from Costa Rica
- Michael Rodríguez (cyclist) (born 1989), Cyclist from Colombia
- Nicholas Rodriguez (born 2005), American football player
- Nicolás Alejandro Rodríguez (born 1991), Uruguayan football player
- Nivaldo Rodríguez (born 1997), Venezuelan baseball player
- Pablo Sebastián Rodríguez (born 1978), Argentine basketball player
- Paul Rodriguez Jr. (born 1984), Mexican-American Skateboarder
- Pat Rodriguez (1900–1964), Australian rules football player and administrator
- Pedro Rodríguez (cyclist, born 1950), Cuban cyclist
- Pedro Rodríguez (cyclist, born 1966), Ecuadorian road cyclist
- Randy Rodríguez (born 1999), Dominican baseball player
- Raudi Rodriguez (born 2003), Dominican baseball player
- Ricardo Rodríguez (racing driver) (1942–1962), Mexican Formula 1 race car driver
- Rich Rodriguez (born 1963), American football coach
- Richard Rodríguez (cyclist) (born 1978), Chilean road cyclist
- Rowby-John Rodriguez (born 1994), Austrian darts player
- Ruben Rodríguez (1946–1995), Filipino chess master
- Rusty-Jake Rodriguez (born 2000), Austrian darts player
- Sean Rodriguez (born 1985), American baseball player
- Sebastián Rodríguez (footballer) (born 1992), Uruguayan footballer
- Sebastián Rodríguez (swimmer) (born 1957), Spanish Paralympic swimmer
- Silento Rodriguez (1933–2024), Mexican-American professional wrestler
- Steve Rodriguez (born 1970), American college baseball coach
- Vic Rodriguez (baseball) (born 1961), American baseball coach
- Vicente Rodríguez (boxer) (born 1954), Spanish boxer
- Wandy Rodríguez (born 1979), Dominican baseball player
- Yair Rodríguez (born 1992), Mexican mixed martial artist
- Yerry Rodríguez (born 1997), Dominican baseball player
- Yorgelis Rodríguez (born 1995), Cuban track and field athlete
- Yulianne Rodríguez (born 1982), Cuban basketball player
- A family of Mexican professional wrestlers:
  - Aaron Rodríguez (born 1942), better known as Mil Máscaras; also notable as an actor
  - José Luis Rodríguez (born 1951), better known as Dos Caras; brother of Mil Máscaras
  - Aaron Rodríguez (born 1976), better known as Sicodelico, Jr.; nephew of Dos Caras and Mil Máscaras
  - José Alberto Rodríguez (born 1977), best known as Alberto Del Rio; son of Dos Caras and nephew of Mil Máscaras
  - Guillermo Rodríguez (born 1988), best known as El Hijo de Dos Caras; younger brother of Alberto Del Rio

=== Fiction ===
- Bender (Futurama), whose full name is Bender Bending Rodríguez
- Marco Rodriguez, (played by Alejandro Edda) is a character from the television drama series Fear the Walking Dead
- Rico Rodriguez (Just Cause), player character and the dictator removal specialist in the video game series Just Cause
- Roscoe Rodriguez, the main protagonist of the British comic book series MPH

=== Other ===
- Aurora Rodríguez Carballeira (1879–1955), Spanish woman who murdered her teenage daughter, conceived as a eugenics experiment
- Edie Rodriguez (born 1961), American businesswoman and travel industry executive
- Juliana Panizo Rodríguez (1947–2024), Spanish academic
- Ricky Rodriguez (1975–2005), American member of a religious cult called The Family
- Santos Rodriguez (died 1973), American murder victim
- Yohana Rodríguez (1980/1981–2026), Colombian war casualty during the 2026 United States intervention in Venezuela

== See also ==
- Rodrigues (surname), Portuguese equivalent of Rodríguez
- Disambiguation Sub-Pages:

- Alberto Rodríguez (disambiguation)
- Alfonso Rodriguez (disambiguation)
- Alejandro Rodríguez (disambiguation)
- Ángel Rodríguez (disambiguation)
- Antonio Rodríguez (disambiguation)
- Arturo Rodríguez (disambiguation)
- Cesar Rodriguez (disambiguation)
- David Rodriguez (disambiguation)
- Daniel Rodriguez (disambiguation)
- Fernando Rodríguez (disambiguation)
- Francisco Rodriguez (disambiguation)
- Guillermo Rodríguez (disambiguation)
- Héctor Rodríguez (disambiguation)
- Ignacio Rodríguez (disambiguation)
- Isidro Rodriguez (disambiguation)
- Jorge Rodríguez (disambiguation)
- José Luis Rodríguez (disambiguation)
- Juan Rodríguez (disambiguation)
- Luis Rodriguez (disambiguation)
- Marco Rodriguez (disambiguation)
- Mauricio Rodríguez (disambiguation)
- Natalia Rodríguez (disambiguation)
- Osvaldo Rodríguez (disambiguation)
- Pablo Rodríguez (disambiguation)
- Peter Rodríguez (disambiguation)
