= Freddy Rodriguez =

Freddy or Freddie Rodriguez may refer to:

- Freddy Rodriguez (actor) (born 1975), American actor
- Freddy Rodríguez (artist) (1945–2022), Dominican Republic artist in the United States
- Freddy Rodríguez (baseball) (1924–2009), former Major League Baseball pitcher
- Freddy Rodriguez (saxophonist), American jazz saxophonist and composer
- Fred Rodriguez (born 1973), nicknamed "Freddie", American road racing cyclist
- Freddie Rodriguez, American politician who assumed office in 2013

== See also ==
- Fernando Rodríguez (disambiguation)
