= Ansa =

Ansa or ANSA may refer to:

== Organizations ==
- Agenzia Nazionale Stampa Associata, Italian news agency
  - Ansa Mediterranean or ANSAmed, section of the above
- Applied Neuroscience Society of Australasia
- Artists for a New South Africa (1989–c.2014)
- Association of Norwegian Students Abroad

== Science and technology ==
=== Anatomy ===
- Ansa cervicalis, a loop of nerves that are part of the cervical plexus
- Ansa lenticularis, a part of the brain, making up the superior layer of the substantia innominata of Meynert
- Loop of Henle (ansa nephroni), a portion of a nephron in the kidney
- Ansa of the tympanal organ

=== Astronomy ===
- Ansae, compact nebulosities such as can be found in protoplanetary nebulae or at the ends of spiral galaxy bars
- One of the apparent ends of the rings of Saturn

=== Computing ===
- Advanced Networked Systems Architecture, a 1990s, pre-CORBA, distributed systems architecture
- ANSA Pre-processor, commercial pre-processing software (Automatic Net-generation for Structural Analysis)

=== Other uses in science and technology ===
- Ansa (moth), a genus of moth
- In archaeology, the engraved and ornamented handle of a vase
- Bridge (chemical) between two functional groups/ligands
  - Ansa-metallocene

== People ==
- Ansa, Queen of the Lombards (fl. 753–774), wife of Desiderius, king of the Lombards
- Ansa Ikonen (1913–1989), Finnish actress
- Tina McElroy Ansa (born 1949), African American novelist, filmmaker, teacher, and journalist

== Other uses ==
- Ansa (Hinduism) or Aṃśa, a solar deity and one of the Adityas
- ANSA, equivalent of NASA in the 1968 film Planet of the Apes
- Armed non-state actors, a term used in political science
- National Security Advisor (United States), Assistant to the President for National Security Affairs

== See also ==
- Ansah, a given name and surname
- Anza (disambiguation)
