= David Rodriguez =

David Rodriguez may refer to:

== Sportspeople ==
- David "Silento" Rodríguez (wrestler) (1933–2024), Mexican-American professional wrestler
- David Rodríguez (water polo) (born 1955), Cuban Olympic water polo player
- David Rodriguez (boxer) (born 1977), American heavyweight boxer
- David Rodríguez (footballer, born 1986), Spanish football forward
- David Rodríguez (soccer, born 2002), Mexican-born American soccer attacking midfielder
- David Rodríguez (footballer, born 2000), Spanish football right-back

== Others ==
- David Rodriguez (singer-songwriter) (1952–2015), American folk musician and poet
- David M. Rodriguez (born 1954), American Army General
- David Rodríguez Rivera, Salvadoran priest

== See also ==
- Rodríguez (surname)
