= Ángel Rodríguez =

Ángel Rodríguez may refer to:

- Ángel Manuel Rodríguez, Seventh-day Adventist theologian
- Ángel Rodríguez Lozano (born 1952), Spanish radio journalist and popularizer of science
- Ángel Rodríguez (footballer, born 1879) (1879–1959), founder and first president of the Real Club Deportivo Español
- Ángel Rodríguez (footballer, born 1972), Spanish footballer and manager
- Ángel Rodríguez (footballer, born 1985), Mexican football midfielder
- Ángel Rodríguez (footballer, born 1987), Spanish footballer
- Gary Rodríguez (Angel Rodríguez Miranda, born 1977), Puerto Rican politician
- Ángel Rodríguez (motorcyclist) (born 1985), Spanish motorcycle racer
- Ángel Rodríguez (boxer) (1891–1974), Argentinian boxer
- Ángel M. Rodríguez Otero (born 1967), Puerto Rican politician
- Ángel David Rodríguez (born 1980), Spanish sprinter
- Ángel Luis Rodríguez (born 1976), Panamanian footballer
- Angel Rodriguez (film), a 2005 film
- Ángel Rodríguez (basketball) (born 1992), Puerto Rican college basketball player
- Ángel Rodríguez (footballer, born 1992), Uruguayan footballer
- Angel Rodriguez-Diaz (1955–2023), Puerto Rican painter

== See also ==
- Miguel Ángel Rodríguez (disambiguation)
