= Anza =

Anza, Anzah, or de Anza might refer to:

== Communities ==
=== United States ===
- Anza, California, a town in Riverside County, California
- Anza, Imperial County, California, a town in Imperial County, California, along California State Route 111
- Camp Anza, a defunct Army installation in Riverside, California

=== Other communities ===
- Anzá, a town in Antioquia department, Colombia
- Anza, a neighborhood of Agadir, Morocco
- Anzah, a Palestinian village in the West Bank

== Landforms and parks ==
- Anza (river), a river in Piedmont, Italy
- Anza trough, in Kenya
- Anza Valley, in Riverside County, California
- Anza-Borrego Desert State Park, in Southern California
- Lake Anza, a recreational swimming reservoir in the Berkeley Hills, California

== People ==
- Anza (singer) (born 1976), Japanese singer and actress
- Juan Bautista de Anza (1736–1788), colonial Spanish explorer and governor of New Mexico
- Juan Bautista de Anza I (1693–1740), Spanish explorer and father of Juan Bautista de Anza
- Murad Abu Anza (born 1986), Arab-Israeli footballer
- Mauricio Rodriguez Anza (born 1957), Mexican architect and designer
- Santo Anzà (born 1980), Italian cyclist

== Schools ==
- Anza Trail School, an elementary school in the Sahuarita Unified School District of Arizona
- Anza Elementary School, an elementary school in the Torrance Unified School District of Torrance, California
- De Anza College, a community college in Cupertino, California
- De Anza High School, in Richmond, California

== Other uses ==
- Anza (missile), a Pakistani-built surface-to-air missile
- Anza (tribe), an Arab tribe
- 2061 Anza, an asteroid
- De Anza Motor Lodge, on Route 66 in Albuquerque, New Mexico
- De Anza League, a sports league in San Bernardino County, California
- De Anza Theatre, a building in Riverside, California
- Joseph Anza, a character in the animated series Fillmore!
- OCA-Anza, an observatory in Orange County, California (see List of observatory codes)
- Agura or Anza, a Japanese term for sitting cross-legged
- Juan de Anza House, in San Juan Bautista, California

== See also ==
- Ansa (disambiguation)
- Ansah (disambiguation)
