= 2005–06 UAE Football League =

UAE Football League
- Season: 2005–06
- Champions: Al Ahli
- AFC Champions League: Al Wahda; Al Ain
- Matches: 132
- Goals: 467 (3.54 per match)

Statistics of UAE Football League for the 2005–06 season.

== Overview ==
It was contested by 12 teams, and Shabab Al Ahli Club won the league after defeating Al Wahda in a one-legged championship playoff game. The two teams finished the regular season tied with 47 points.

== Foreign players ==
Club	Player 1	Player 2	Player 3	Player 4	Former players
Al-Ahli	(Argentina) Fernando Rodríguez	(Bulgaria) Martin Kamburov	(Iran) Farhad Majidi	(Uruguay) Juan Martín Parodi	
Al-Ain	(Brazil) Fabrício Lopes	(Brazil) Kelly	(Ivory Coast) Ibrahim Diaky	(Serbia and Montenegro) Nenad Jestrović	(The Gambia) Ousman Jallow (Morocco) Said Kharazi (Nigeria) Onyekachi Nwoha (Panama) Alberto Blanco (Panama) Luis Tejada
Al-Jazira	(Brazil) Diogo	(Ivory Coast) Antonin Koutouan	(Nigeria) Bartholomew Ogbeche	(Qatar) Mohammed Salem Al-Enazi	(Colombia) Elson Becerra (Ivory Coast) Ibrahim Diaky
Al-Nasr	(Brazil) Valdir Bigode	(Iraq) Hussein Alaa Hussein	(Morocco) Faysal El Idrissi		(Argentina) Andrés Guglielminpietro
Al-Shaab	(Argentina) Adrián Fernández	(Iran) Ali Samereh			
Al-Shabab	(Iran) Iman Mobali	(Iran) Mehrdad Oladi	(Liberia) Arcadia Toe	(Slovakia) Miroslav Sovič	(Brazil) Geraldo (Morocco) Said Idraoui (Senegal) Mohammed Manga
Al-Wahda	(Angola) Maurito	(Bosnia and Herzegovina) Branimir Bajić	(Bosnia and Herzegovina) Slaviša Mitrović		(Brazil) Fábio Júnior (Iran) Javad Nekounam
Al-Wasl	(Bahrain) Hussain Salman	(Brazil) Alexandre Oliveira	(France) Malik Benachour		(Iran) Farhad Majidi
Baniyas	(Benin) Oumar Tchomogo	(Burkina Faso) Abdoulaye Traoré	(Togo) Kouadji Dogbé	(Togo) Mickaël Dogbé	
Emirates	(Algeria) Karim Kerkar	(Togo) Adékambi Olufadé			
Dibba Al-Hisn	(Cameroon) Richard Bohomo	(South Sudan) Richard Justin Lado			
Sharjah	(Brazil) Anderson Barbosa	(Iran) Javad Nekounam	(Morocco) Zakaria Aboub		

== League standings ==
Pos	Team	Pld	W	D	L	GF	GA	GD	Pts	Qualification or relegation
1	Al Wahda	22	15	2	5	64	30	+34	47	Qualification for Championship Playoff
2	Al Ahli	22	14	5	3	44	24	+20	47	Qualification for Championship Playoff
3	Al Jazira	22	14	3	5	43	35	+8	45	
4	Al Ain	22	13	2	7	42	23	+19	41	Qualification for 2007 AFC Champions League (Note: Al Ain qualified to the 2007 AFC Champions League as winners of the 2005–06 UAE President's Cup.)
5	Al Nasr	22	11	2	9	50	35	+15	35	
6	Al Shabab	22	10	4	8	40	39	+1	34	
7	Sharjah	22	8	6	8	52	41	+11	30	
8	Al Wasl	22	9	2	11	33	32	+1	29	
9	Al Shaab	22	6	7	9	30	39	−9	25	
10	Emirates	22	4	6	12	21	48	−27	18	
11	Baniyas	22	3	4	15	24	56	−32	13	Relegation to 2006–07 UAE First Division League
12	Dibba Al Hisn	22	1	5	16	24	65	−41	8	Relegation to 2006–07 UAE First Division League

Source: rsssf.com

=== Championship playoff ===
26 May 2006

Al Wahda	1–4	Al Ahli

Al Ain

NB: Al Ahli played under protest following accusations of bribery against Al Wahda in their final match at Sharjah (where they were down 3-1 at half-time before winning 3-6; they allegedly bought 5 Sharjah players for 120,000 Euro).
