= Pablo Rodríguez =

Pablo Rodríguez may refer to:

== Footballers ==
- Pablo Rodríguez (footballer, born 1955), born Pablo Rodríguez Flores, Spanish midfielder
- Pablo Rodríguez (footballer, born 1973), born Pablo de Jesús Rodríguez Álvarez, Mexican defender/midfielder
- Pablo Rodríguez (footballer, born 1975), born Pablo Jesús Rodríguez Méndez, Spanish midfielder
- Pablo Rodríguez (footballer, born 1977), born Pablo Martín Rodríguez, Argentine midfielder
- Pablo Rodríguez (footballer, born 1979), born Pablo Sebastián Rodríguez Carbajal, Uruguayan defender
- Pablo Rodríguez (footballer, born 1985), born Pablo Rodríguez Aracil, Spanish forward
- Pablo Rodríguez (footballer, born 1986), born Pablo Rodríguez Guzmán, Costa Rican defender in the 2003 FIFA U-17 World Championship
- Pablo Rodríguez (footballer, born 2001), born Pablo Rodríguez Delgado, Spanish forward

== Others ==
- Pablo Rodriguez (computer scientist) (born 1972), Spanish computer scientist and researcher
- Pablo Rodriguez (Canadian politician) (born 1967), Member of Parliament
- Pablo Rodríguez Regordosa (born 1970), Mexican politician
- Pablo Sebastián Rodríguez (born 1978), Argentine former basketball player
- Pablo Rodríguez Grez (1937–2025), Chilean lawyer and politician, founder of the Fatherland and Liberty Nationalist Front
- Pablo Rodríguez (cyclist) (born 1993), Spanish cross-country mountain biker
