= Daniel Rodrigues =

Daniel Rodrigues may refer to:

- Dan Rodrigues (born 1975), CEO and co-founder of Kareo, a developer of medical practice management software
- Daniel da Costa Rodrigues (born 2002), Portuguese professional golfer
- Daniel Marins Rodrigues (born 1988), Brazilian footballer for Figueirense
- Daniel Rodrigues (born 1986), Brazilian wheelchair tennis player
- Danny Pinheiro Rodrigues (born 1985), French artistic gymnast
- Dani Rodrigues (born 1980), Portuguese footballer for Doxa Katokopias F.C.

== See also ==
- Daniel Rodriguez (disambiguation)
