= Marcelo Gallardo =

Argentine football manager (born 1976)

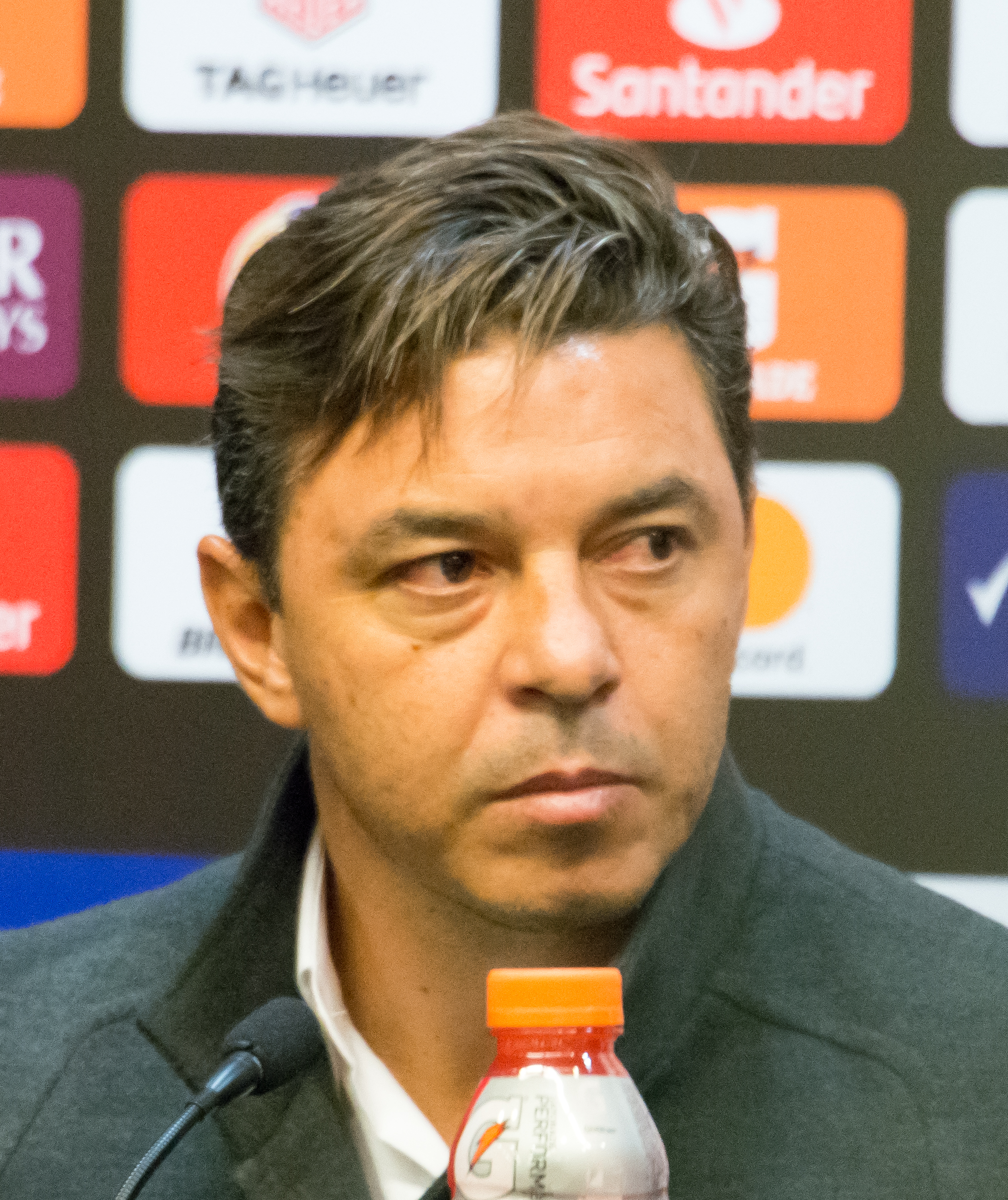
- Gallardo in 2019

Personal information
- Full name: Marcelo Daniel Gallardo
- Date of birth: 18 January 1976 (age 50)
- Place of birth: Merlo, Buenos Aires, Argentina
- Height: 1.69 m (5 ft 7 in)
- Position: Attacking midfielder

Team information
- Current team: Ecuador (manager)

Senior career*
Years	Team	Apps	(Gls)
1993–1999	River Plate	109	(17)
1999–2003	Monaco	103	(18)
2003–2006	River Plate	77	(25)
2007–2008	Paris Saint-Germain	22	(2)
2008–2009	D.C. United	15	(4)
2009–2010	River Plate	28	(7)
2010–2011	Nacional Montevideo	13	(3)
Total		367	(76)

International career
1994–2003	Argentina	44	(13)

Managerial career
- 2011–2012: Nacional Montevideo
- 2014–2022: River Plate
- 2023–2024: Al-Ittihad
- 2024–2026: River Plate
- 2026–: Ecuador
Medal record
Men's Football
Representing Argentina
Pan American Games
Gold medal – first place	1995 Mar del Plata	Team
FIFA Confederations Cup
Silver medal – second place	1995 Saudi Arabia	Team
Olympic Games
Silver medal – second place	1996 Atlanta	Team
- * Club domestic league appearances and goals

Marcelo Daniel Gallardo (Spanish pronunciation: [maɾˈselo ɣaˈʝaɾðo]; (Note: In isolation, Gallardo is pronounced Spanish pronunciation: [ɡaˈʝaɾðo].) born 18 January 1976) is an Argentine football manager and former professional player who is the current head coach of the Ecuador national team. During his playing career, Gallardo was an attacking midfielder and playmaker. He was regarded for his vision, technique, class, dribbling and especially his defence-splitting passing.

Gallardo began his career in the club's youth divisions, and made his debut in the Argentine Primera División at age 17 in 1993. After a six-year period in which he won five local league championships, the 1996 Copa Libertadores and the 1997 Supercopa Libertadores, he transferred to France's Ligue 1 Monaco and was named French League Footballer of the Year in 2000. Gallardo represented Argentina in two FIFA World Cups, although his performance was affected by injuries in both.

After topping the 2010–11 Uruguayan Primera División season with Nacional de Montevideo, Gallardo retired as a player to coach the team. He helped Nacional de Montevideo defend their championship the following season before transferring to River Plate. River Plate won local championships under Gallardo and returned to the international scene, where they had not won a tournament from 1997 to 2014. With the most international tournament championships in team history, he is considered River Plate's most successful coach to date.

== Club career ==
=== Early years and first seasons with River Plate ===
Born in Parque San Martín in the Merlo Partido in the Greater Buenos Aires area to construction worker Máximo Gallardo and nursing home employee Ana María (née Maidana), Gallardo began playing football at about age 10 in the local Once Colegiales and Nahuel clubs. After receiving offers from several First Division teams to join their junior squads, he landed a trial at River Plate and joined as a midfielder in 1988. Gallardo made his professional debut at age 17 for the club during the 1992–93 Argentinian Torneo de Clausura in a 2–0 win against Newell's Old Boys.

The team then won the 1993–94 Torneo de Apertura. Gallardo won a series of national tournaments with the team during the next few seasons (including the 1994, 1996 and 1997 Torneo de Apertura and the 1997 Torneo de Clausura), and became a starting midfielder by 1996. He received his first international trophy (the Copa Libertadores) that year, as River Plate defeated América de Cali 2–1 in the final series. Starting both matches on the bench, Gallardo took the field in the second half. River Plate lost the Intercontinental Cup 0–1 to Juventus at Tokyo's National Stadium several months later.

Gallardo was scouted by European teams during the late 1990s and signed with France's Ligue 1 Monaco, bringing his initial spell with River Plate to an end with the 1998–99 season. He had played 109 league games with the club and scored 17 goals.

=== Monaco ===
Gallardo signed a five-year contract with Monaco in 1999 for US$9.36 million (equivalent to US$18,089,892 in 2025). He made his European debut on the opening day of the 1999–2000 season in a 2–2 tie against Saint-Étienne, and scored his first goal for the team on 12 September in a 1–2 away loss to Rennes. Despite an ankle injury before the season, Gallardo quickly adapted to French football and partnered with Ludovic Giuly in midfield and attackers Marco Simone and David Trezeguet. AS Monaco won the Première Division, and Gallardo was selected French League Footballer of the Year with eight goals in 28 matches.

Coach Didier Deschamps benched him midway through the 2000–01 season, and their relationship remained tense until Gallardo left the club at the end of the 2003–04 season with Christian Panucci and Marco Simone. He scored 23 goals in 126 matches in four years with Monaco, winning the Coupe de la Ligue during his final season.

=== Return to River Plate ===
Gallardo returned to River Plate in 2004 and was named squad captain. The team won the Torneo de Clausura, his last championship win as a River Plate player, soon after his return. Gallardo played a key scoring role in the 1–1 home tie against Atlético de Rafaela, which clinched the championship over long-standing rivals Boca Juniors.

That year, the team lost to Boca Juniors in the semifinals of the 2004 Copa Libertadores. The series was tied 2–2; Boca Juniors won in the penalty shootout, eliminating River Plate from the tournament. After a physical encounter with Raúl Alfredo Cascini in the first-leg match, both players were given the red card and were unable to participate in the second-leg match. More players were involved in the fight, in which Gallardo scratched Roberto Abbondanzieri's face; it was one of his professional career's darkest moments.

=== Paris Saint-Germain ===
Amid institutional and performance problems in River Plate and a bad streak since his return to the club (including ten red cards in 256 matches), Gallardo began considering offers to return to the French league. Parisian club Paris Saint-Germain and Marseille were interested in him, and he chose the former.

PSG had a poor season, nearly relegated to the second division and eliminated from the UEFA Cup. After one season with the club, scoring two goals in 13 matches, Gallardo terminated his two-year contract to move to Major League Soccer in the United States.

=== D.C. United ===
On 29 January 2008, Gallardo was presented as the newest member of D.C. United. With a salary of $1.87 million (equivalent to $2,796,329 in 2025), Gallardo was the highest-paid player in D.C. United history and its first Designated Player. He had the third-largest salary in MLS that year, behind English midfielder David Beckham of the LA Galaxy ($6.5 million) and Mexican forward Cuauhtémoc Blanco of the Chicago Fire ($2.67 million). Gallardo scored his first league goal for United on 5 April 2008 against Toronto FC. He underwent surgery for a sports hernia on 17 and 19 July, which sidelined him for most of the 2008 season. Scoring four goals in 15 matches, Gallardo's contract was considered one of the worst in MLS history. In February 2009, he left D.C. United and returned to River Plate for the third time.

=== Nacional de Montevideo ===
This is the moment when I have to think there is also a life after football.

— Gallardo on his retirement decision, 2011

In 2010, after a final short spell in River Plate as a player, Gallardo signed with Nacional de Montevideo in the Uruguayan league. Although he appeared in only 13 matches due to injuries, he was respected for his personality and dedication to the game. On 12 June 2011, Gallardo took the field in the second half for a 1–0 victory against Defensor Sporting for the 2011–12 Uruguayan championship in his final match. He retired as a player and was hired a few days later to manage Nacional, his first managerial position.

== International career ==
Gallardo was considered for the Argentina national under-20 football team, but could not participate in the 1995 FIFA World Youth Championship in Qatar because Argentina national team coach Daniel Passarella wanted to include him on his squad (where he started at age 18 in 1994). He debuted in a 3–0 friendly-match victory against Chile in Santiago that year, substituting for Marcelo Espina.

The midfielder won his first international championship the following year, a gold medal at the 1995 Pan American Games. Considered a key player with Guillermo Barros Schelotto, he scored one of the victory goals in the final penalty shootout against Mexico. Argentina then finished second in the 1995 FIFA Confederations Cup and the 1996 Summer Olympics. Despite losing the Olympics' final to Nigeria, Gallardo said in 2018 that he valued that silver medal. He was on the Argentina squad for the 1995 and 1997 Copa América, reaching the quarter-finals both times (considered a failure by the local press).

Although Gallardo had a series of injuries (including a hamstring strain due to a lack of rest between matches) before the 1998 FIFA World Cup in France, he played in the group stage against Jamaica and Croatia and in the eighth-finals victory against England; the team lost in the quarter-finals to Holland. After a near-perfect performance in the CONMEBOL FIFA World Cup qualification, Argentina entered the World Cup in Japan and South Korea as one of the favourites; however, they were eliminated in the group stage for the first time in history. Although Gallardo was part of the squad, he spent the tournament on the bench. Looking back at his injury-plagued World Cup participation, he called not being able to compete at the same level as the other players "the worst thing that can happen to a footballer". During his international career, Gallardo made 44 appearances and scored 13 goals.

== Managing career ==
=== Nacional ===
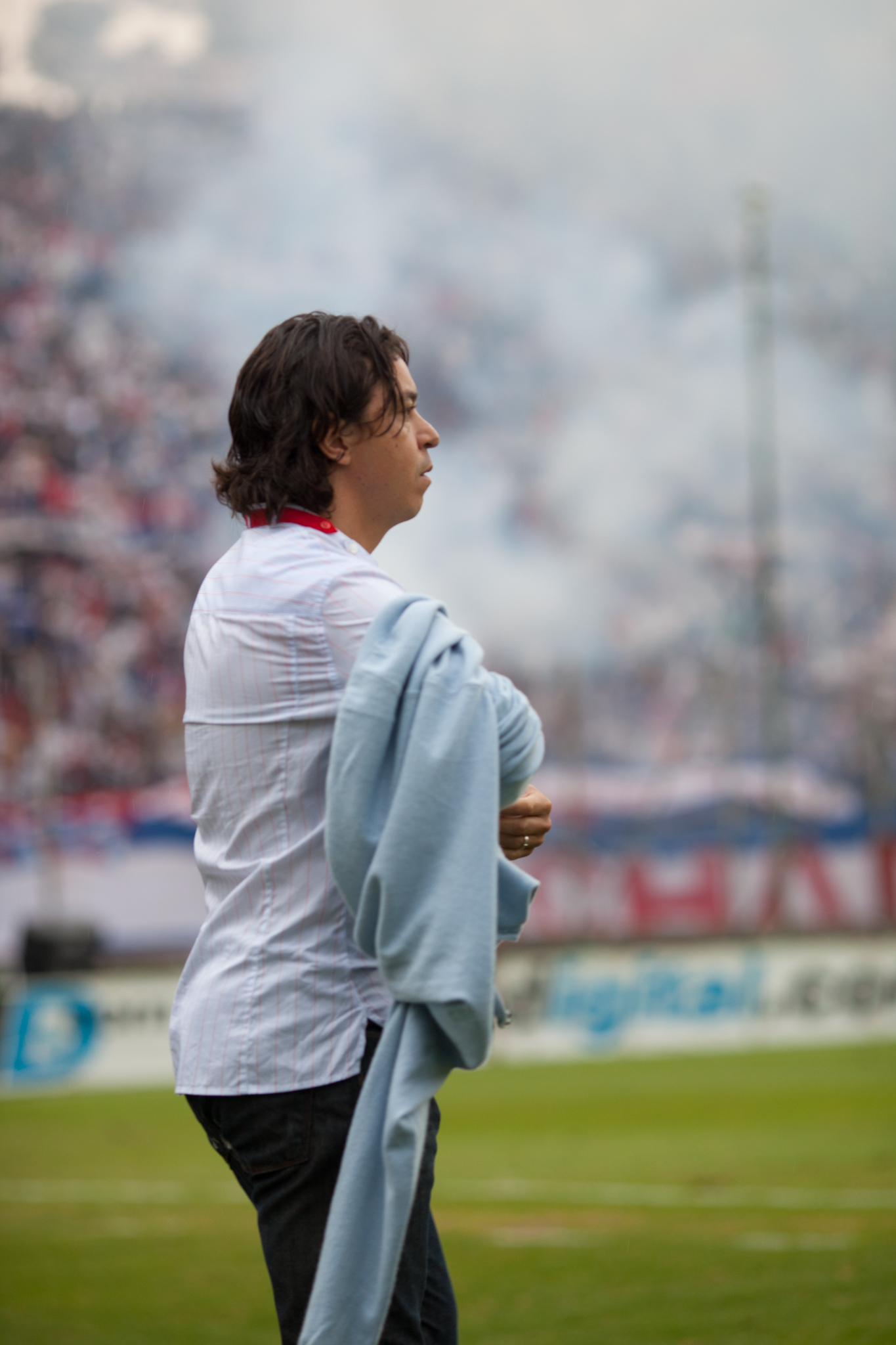
Gallardo coaching Nacional

In 2010, before retiring as a player, Gallardo obtained his coaching certificate from José Farías de Vicente López Technical School 62 in Vicente López, Buenos Aires. Days after announcing his retirement from the Nacional de Montevideo squad which won the 2010–11 Uruguayan Primera División season championship, he accepted the team's offer to coach. Nacional defended their championship the next season, becoming the 2011–2012 champions for Gallardo. His assistants included Matías Biscay, Pablo Rodríguez and Marcelo Tulbovitz. Gallardo later described managing Nacional as an "accelerated course", coaching players with whom he had played.

=== River Plate ===
==== 2014–2015 ====
On 6 June 2014, Gallardo was presented by technical secretary and former teammate Enzo Francescoli as the new manager of River Plate after the controversial resignation of Ramón Díaz on 27 May. He brought some of his assistants from Nacional de Montevideo, such as Matías Biscay and Marcelo Tulbovitz. Díaz' key players Carlos Carbonero, Manuel Lanzini and Cristian Ledesma left the club, and players he had relegated (such as Carlos Sánchez and Rodrigo Mora) returned. River Plate bought only two players: attacking midfielder Leonardo Pisculichi, who had been relegated to second division with Argentinos Juniors, and goalkeeper Julio Chiarini from Instituto de Córdoba.

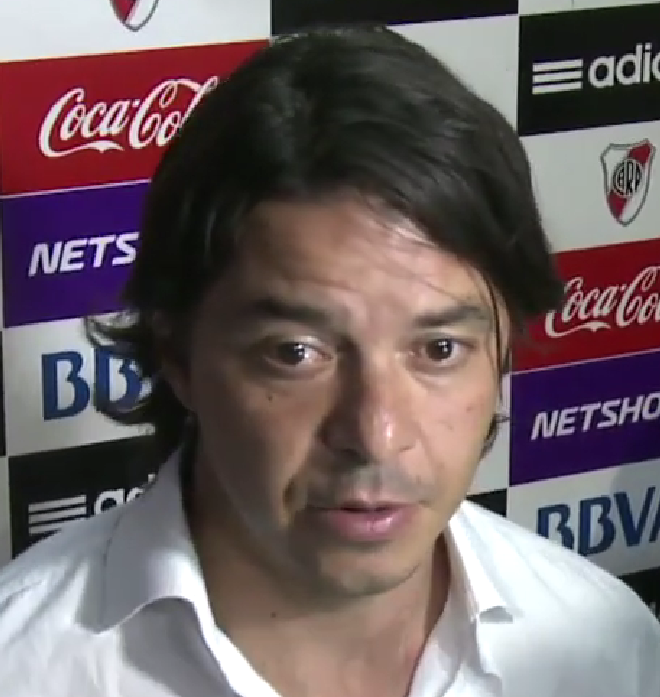
Gallardo in 2014

Gallardo's coaching style was praised by the Argentine press, with the team tying its all-time unbeaten record on 9 November with 32 undefeated games before losing to Estudiantes de La Plata three days later. Of the 32 games, eight were played for Ramón Díaz. River Plate led the Torneo de Transición until it reached the Copa Sudamericana semi-finals, where River would face the rival Boca Juniors. Planning to rest his key players for the semi-finals, Gallardo played a substitute team against second-place Racing Club and lost on an own goal by Ramiro Funes Mori. Racing went on to win its first championship since 2001 by two points over River Plate.

River eliminated Boca Juniors with a lone goal from Leonardo Pisculichi in the second leg, played at the Monumental Stadium. In the 2014 Copa Sudamericana Finals, Pisculichi scored again to draw 1–1 against Atlético Nacional in the away leg at the Estadio Atanasio Girardot. Defenders Gabriel Mercado and Germán Pezzella scored in the second leg at the Monumental, giving the unbeaten River Plate a 2–0 win and its first international title since 1997. Gallardo was the first River Plate player to win an international title as a player and a coach. He dedicated the victory to his mother, who had died shortly before the second game against Boca Juniors.

In early 2015, Gallardo's River Plate competed in the 2015 Recopa Sudamericana as the 2014 Copa Sudamericana winners against 2014 Copa Libertadores champions San Lorenzo. River won 1–0 at home in the first leg and 1–0 in the second, both goals scored by Carlos Sánchez.

After a poor group stage which nearly eliminated them from the tournament, River Plate advanced to the 2015 Copa Libertadores Round of 16 as the worst team in the group stage to face Boca Juniors (the best team). River won the first leg at home 1–0, with a penalty kick by Carlos Sánchez. In the second leg, played at La Bombonera stadium, the teams had drawn 0–0 at the half. Returning to the pitch for the second half, River Plate's players were attacked by Boca Juniors fans. After a one-hour delay, the match was suspended by a CONMEBOL official. Days later, the organization disqualified Boca Juniors and River advanced to the tournament's quarter-finals. The team later reached the Libertadores final and played against Mexico's Tigres. In the first leg, at the Estadio Universitario, the game was scoreless. In the second leg, played at the Monumental, River won 3–0 with goals by Lucas Alario, Carlos Sánchez, and Ramiro Funes Mori for their first Libertadores championship in nine years. The next day, Gallardo's team travelled to Osaka for the 2015 Suruga Bank Championship against 2014 J.League Cup winners Gamba Osaka. The match was a 3–0 victory for River Plate, the team's fourth international title under Gallardo.

Despite poor results in the 2015 Argentine Primera División, River later advanced to the semi-finals of the 2015 Copa Sudamericana to play against fellow Argentine side Huracán. The two-legged series resulted in a 1–0 loss for River in the first leg at home, followed by a 2–2 draw in the second leg. This was Gallardo's first defeat in an international knockout stage as a coach.

River played in the year-end 2015 FIFA Club World Cup, struggling to beat 2015 J1 League winners Sanfrecce Hiroshima 1–0 in the semi-finals with a goal from Lucas Alario and three saves in the first half by goalkeeper Marcelo Barovero. They played poorly in the final, losing 3–0 to European champions Barcelona with goals by Lionel Messi and Luis Suárez. Gallardo was named the fifth-best football coach worldwide in 2015 by the IFFHS.

==== 2016–2022 ====
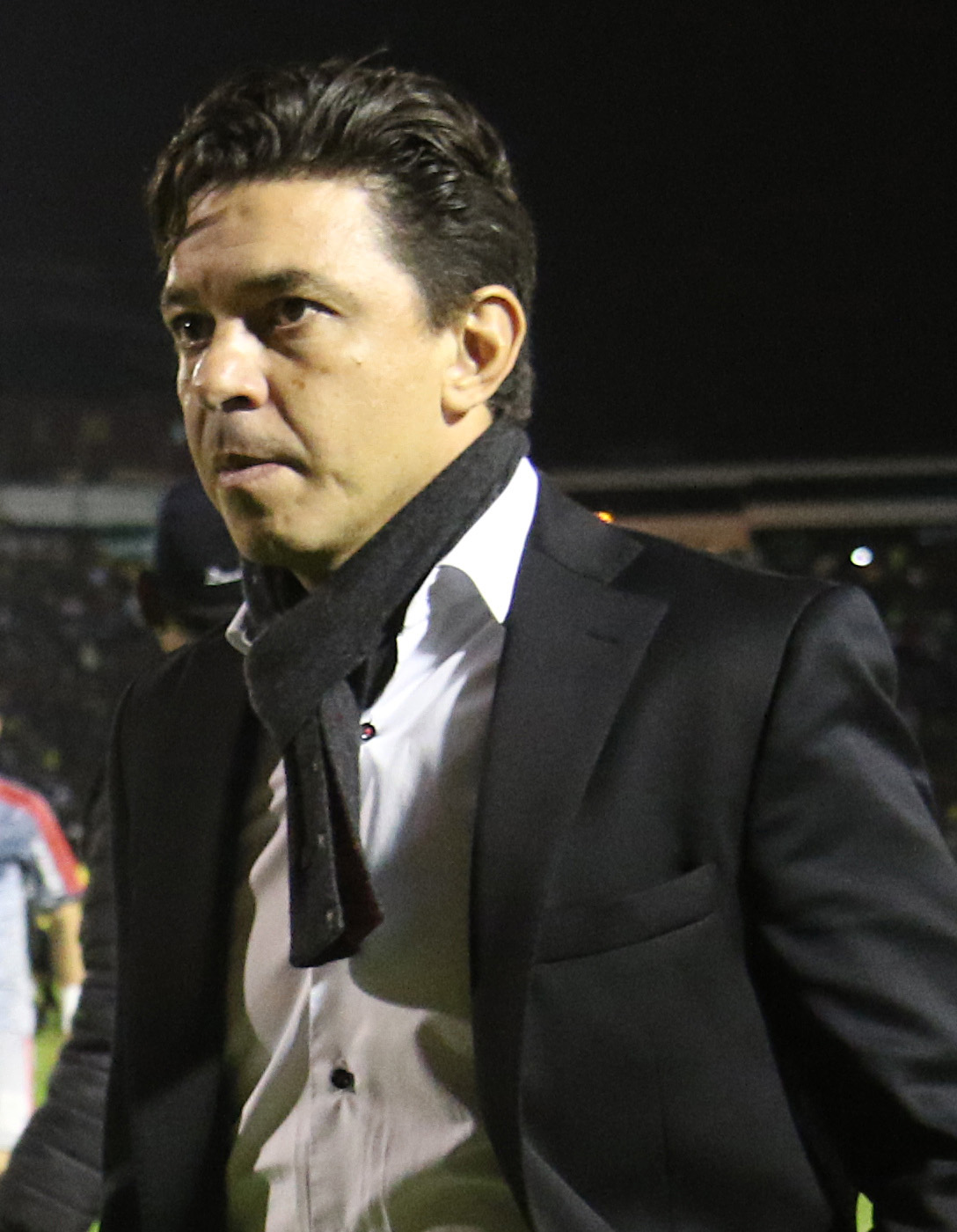
Gallardo in 2016

River Plate were eliminated by runners-up Independiente del Valle in the 2016 Copa Libertadores round of 16. River Plate won the 2016 Recopa Sudamericana against 2015 Copa Sudamericana champions Independiente Santa Fe, defeating them 2–1 at home in the second leg after a scoreless first leg for another international title.

In December of that year, Gallardo led River to the 2015–16 Copa Argentina: his first domestic cup as manager. River Plate then earned the right to play in the 2017 Copa Libertadores and the 2016 Supercopa Argentina against 2016 Primera División champion Lanús, where it was defeated 3–0.

River Plate advanced to the semi-finals of the 2017 Copa Libertadores against Club Atlético Lanús. After winning the first leg 1–0 at Monumental Stadium, they lost the second leg at Estadio Ciudad de Lanús 4–2. River Plate lost the semi-finals 4–3 on aggregate. They defeated Atlético Tucumán days later at the 2016–17 Copa Argentina final in Mendoza for their second consecutive Copa Argentina. This gave River Plate the right to play the 2017 Supercopa Argentina against 2016–17 Argentine Primera División champions Boca Juniors, defeating Boca 2–0 on 14 March 2018.

Except for their victory in the Supercopa Argentina, River Plate began 2018 with a losing streak in the Primera División. They played well in the 2018 Copa Libertadores, however, reaching the finals against Boca Juniors. It was the first time two Argentine teams faced each other in a Libertadores final; the last final had a two-legged home-and-away format, although the second match was played at the Santiago Bernabéu because River Plate fans attacked Boca Juniors players at Monumental Stadium. River Plate and Boca Juniors drew the first match 2–2 at La Bombonera, with goals by Lucas Pratto and Carlos Izquierdoz (own goal). The second match, at the Bernabéu, ended in a 1–1 draw; Pratto again scored for River and sent the match into extra time. River won 3–1, with goals by Juan Fernando Quintero and Pity Martínez. Despite missing the finals with a suspension for violating a previous penalty in the semi-finals against Grêmio, Gallardo's coaching played a key role in the victory (considered one of the most important in Argentine football history). His coaching was praised by the press, and he was called one of the best River Plate managers of all time.

After winning the 2019 Recopa Sudamericana, Gallardo became the most successful River Plate coach in history with ten titles. He is the most successful coach at the international level in club history to date, with seven international titles: two Copa Libertadores (2015 and 2018), the 2014 Copa Sudamericana, three Recopa Sudamericanas (2015, 2016 and 2019) and the 2015 Suruga Bank Championship. He is considered the greatest coach in River Plate history.

In 2019, Gallardo led River Plate to yet another Libertadores final, after defeating arch-rivals Boca Juniors in the semifinal round. In the final, against Flamengo of Brazil, River opened the scoring with a goal by Rafael Santos Borré, and led during most of the match, but were eventually defeated 2–1 after two late goals by Flamengo striker Gabriel Barbosa. Nevertheless, Gallardo was named the best 2019 football coach in the Americas by the Uruguayan newspaper El País, and the second-best in the world by the football website Club World Ranking.

Into the early 2020s, Brazilian teams showed a stronger performance than their counterparts in the CONMEBOL international tournaments, due to a higher competitiveness in their local league and a more favorable domestic economic situation. Although Gallardo displayed his ability to form competitive squads over the years in spite of factors such as key players leaving the roster, Argentina's growing economical disparity with Brazil's took its toll in River Plate's performance against its teams. After a tough fall in the 2021 Copa Libertadores quarter-finals against Atlético Mineiro, he acknowledged their rivals beat them, playing "much better", and opted to focus on that year's edition of the Argentine league. The squad eventually went on to win the championship and Gallardo equaled Ángel Labruna's record of 22 titles as both a player and a coach for the team. Coming close to the expiration of his contract at the end of the season in the midst of speculations about his continuity, he decided to sign for yet at least one more year., stating that he will not continue on the team and that he will take a short break in his coaching career.

=== Al-Ittihad ===
On 18 November 2023, Gallardo became the manager of Al-Ittihad on a one-and-a-half-year contract after having taken a short break from coaching.

Following a crushing 5–0 home defeat to Al-Ettifaq, which confirmed their elimination from the 2024–25 AFC Champions League Elite and compounded a series of poor results, Gallardo was dismissed on 13 May 2024. Despite his sacking, he remained in charge for the final three matches of the season before officially departing on 2 July.

=== Return to River Plate ===
On 5 August 2024, River Plate announced Gallardo as their new head coach, replacing outgoing Martín Demichelis.

In his first season he finished fifth in the Argentine league, won the Superclásico 1–0, and reached the semifinals of the CONMEBOL Libertadores, losing 3–0 on aggregate against Atlético Mineiro.

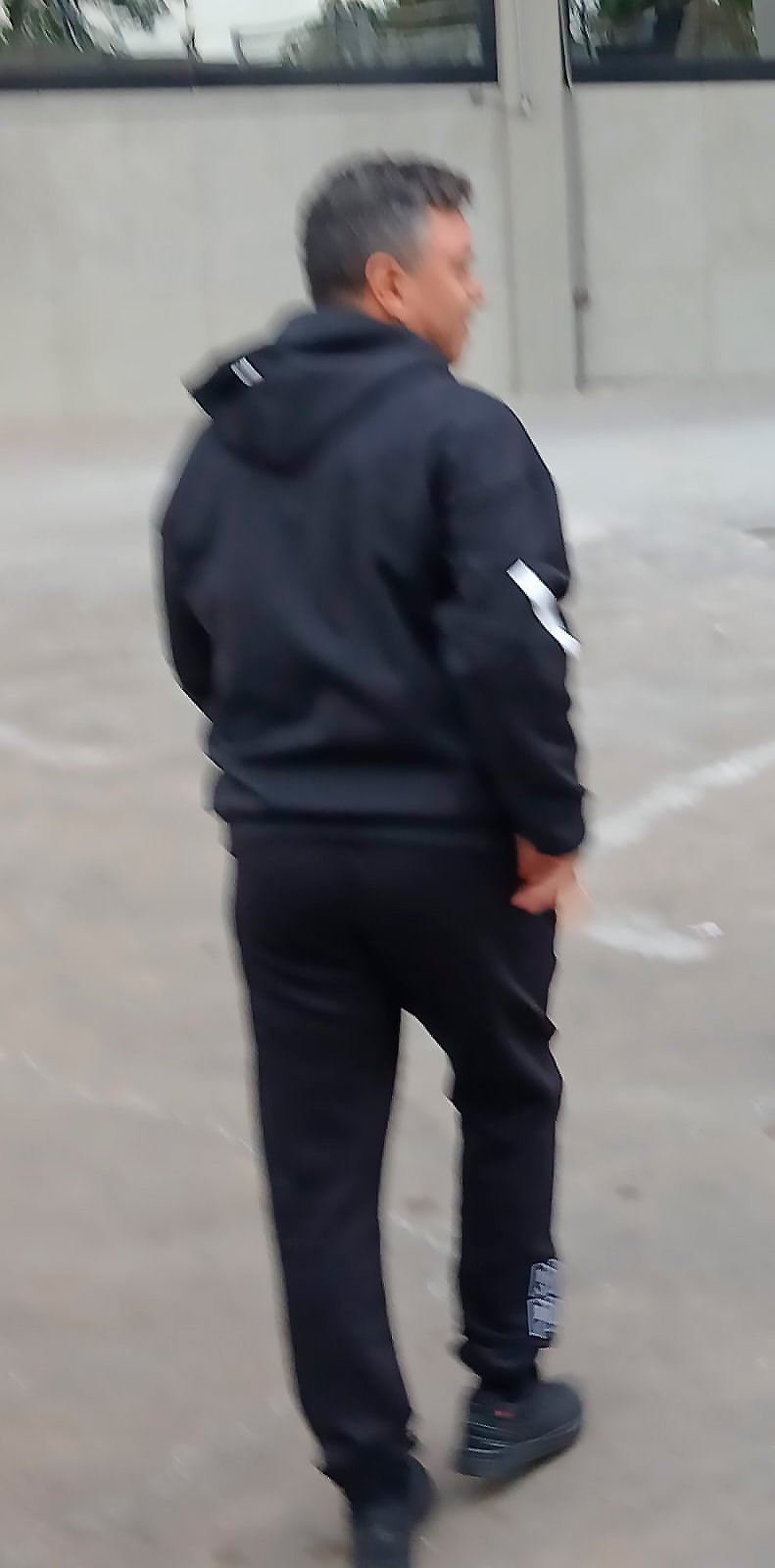
Gallardo in 2025

In his second year back at the club, River Plate got eliminated by Platense, 4–2 on penalties, in the quarter-finals of the Torneo Apertura and was eliminated from the Club World Cup in the group stage in the last match against Inter Milan. In the second half of the year, River Plate failed to qualify for the Libertadores, instead qualifying for the Sudamericana for the first time since 2014. This was after being eliminated from the Libertadores by Palmeiras in the quarter-finals. Gallardo suffered two more suffered more eliminations during this year: from the Copa Argentina in the semifinals and from the Torneo Clausura in the round of 16. To qualify for the Libertadores, rivals Boca Juniors had to win the Torneo Clausura but failed to do so after being eliminated in the semifinals by Racing Club.

After a series of negative streaks in his third year, which included a hammering 1–4 loss at home versus CA Tigre, Gallardo stepped down from his role, bringing his second spell in charge of the club to an end on 23 February 2026.

=== Ecuador ===
On 4 August 2026, Gallardo emerged as the leading candidate to become head coach of the Ecuador national football team following the departure of Sebastián Beccacece. Negotiations were led by Ecuadorian Football Federation (FEF) president Francisco Egas, with Gallardo and Egas holding at least two meetings in Spain during the final stages of the talks. One of the meetings, held in Madrid on 1 September, lasted more than two hours and focused primarily on sporting matters and the long-term structure of Ecuador's national teams.

During the negotiations, Gallardo reportedly proposed a broader sporting project extending beyond the senior national team, involving Ecuador's youth sides at under-20, under-17 and under-15 level, as well as coordination with the women's national team.

On 4 September 2026, multiple reports stated that Gallardo and the FEF had reached a full sporting and financial agreement for him to take charge of Ecuador on a four-year contract, with the 2028 Copa América and the qualification cycle for the 2030 FIFA World Cup identified among the principal objectives. His appointment would represent his first experience managing a national team.

Gallardo succeeded a Beccacece tenure that had become increasingly controversial among sections of the Ecuadorian press and supporters. Beccacece was criticized for several squad selections, the use of players outside their natural positions, the inclusion of players with limited competitive rhythm and the promotion of inexperienced youth players into the senior team. His tactical decisions were again heavily questioned following Ecuador's elimination from the 2026 FIFA World Cup.

A separate controversy had arisen in 2025 after media reports published alleged leaked recordings concerning the selection of 17-year-old Darwin Guagua, who made his senior international debut before appearing in Ecuadorian first-division football. The recordings alleged that his exposure with the national team could help facilitate a transfer to an English club. The FEF rejected the suggestion, stating that national-team selections were based exclusively on technical, sporting and strategic criteria.

Gallardo took over a squad featuring a significant generation of Ecuadorian players established at European clubs, including Moisés Caicedo at Chelsea, Piero Hincapié at Arsenal, Willian Pacho at Paris Saint-Germain and Pervis Estupiñán at AC Milan. Ecuador's squad had been described as one of the most internationally established generations in the country's history.

Gallardo was expected to make his debut during Ecuador's September–October tour of Asia, beginning against South Korea on 24 September, followed by a match against Japan on 1 October.

== Playing style ==
Throughout his career, Gallardo played a central or attacking midfield role as a playmaker. A skillful, intelligent player, he was valued for his vision, technique, class, dribbling, and ability to defeat opponents in one-on-one situations and was best known for defence-splitting passes. Gallardo was noted for his accuracy with direct free kicks and his ball delivery from corners and set pieces. His playing style was compared to Diego Maradona in his youth.

== Personal life ==
Gallardo has four sons from his marriage to his high-school sweetheart, Geraldine La Rosa; one is Delfín footballer Nahuel Gallardo. Another son is Instituto player Matías Gallardo. He had little interest in football during his early years, and preferred flying kites. Gallardo said that he was a San Lorenzo fan before turning to River Plate, influenced by his mother's family.

During his playing and early coaching years, Gallardo was nicknamed el Muñeco ("the doll"). His teammates started calling him that during the early 1990s, when he was one of the squad's youngest members. Gallardo's successful tenure coaching River Plate earned him the nickname Napoleon from fans and the press.

== Career statistics ==
=== Club ===
Appearances and goals by club, season and competition
Club	Season	League			National cup (Note: Includes Coupe de France, U.S. Open Cup)		League cup (Note: Includes Coupe de la Ligue)		Continental		Other		Total	
Club	Season	Division	Apps	Goals	Apps	Goals	Apps	Goals	Apps	Goals	Apps	Goals	Apps	Goals
River Plate	1992–93	Argentine Primera División	4	0	—		—		1	0	—		5	0
River Plate	1993–94	Argentine Primera División	4	0	4	0	—		0	0	—		8	0
River Plate	1994–95	Argentine Primera División	23	3	—		—		6 (Note: Appearances in Copa Libertadores)	2	—		29	5
River Plate	1995–96	Argentine Primera División	21	5	—		—		16	1	—		37	6
River Plate	1996–97	Argentine Primera División	24	4	—		—		3	1	—		27	5
River Plate	1997–98	Argentine Primera División	19	5	—		—		12	3	—		31	8
River Plate	1998–99	Argentine Primera División	14	1	—		—		11	2	—		25	3
River Plate	Total		109	17	4	0	—		49	9	—		162	27
Monaco	1999–2000	Ligue 1	28	8	1	0	0	0	7 (Note: Appearances in UEFA Cup)	0	—		36	8
Monaco	2000–01	Ligue 1	26	6	3	2	1	0	3 (Note: Appearances in UEFA Champions League)	0	1 (Note: Appearance in Trophée des Champions)	0	34	8
Monaco	2001–02	Ligue 1	22	3	5	2	0	0	—		—		27	5
Monaco	2002–03	Ligue 1	27	1	3	1	0	0	—		—		30	2
Monaco	Total		103	18	12	5	1	0	10	0	1	0	127	23
River Plate	2003–04	Argentine Primera División	15	4	—		—		11	3	—		26	7
River Plate	2004–05	Argentine Primera División	25	6	—		—		10	3	—		35	9
River Plate	2005–06	Argentine Primera División	23	11	—		—		11	3	—		34	14
River Plate	2006–07	Argentine Primera División	14	4	—		—		1	1	—		15	5
River Plate	Total		77	25	—		—		33	10	—		110	35
Paris Saint-Germain	2006–07	Ligue 1	13	2	3	0	—		3	0	—		19	2
Paris Saint-Germain	2007–08	Ligue 1	9	0	—		—		3	0	—		12	0
Paris Saint-Germain	Total		22	2	3	0	—		6	0	—		31	2
D.C. United	2008	MLS	15	4	1	0	—		—		—		16	4
River Plate	2008–09	Argentine Primera División	10	3	—		—		4	1	—		14	4
River Plate	2009–10	Argentine Primera División	18	4	—		—		1	0	—		19	4
River Plate	Total		28	7	—		—		5	1	—		33	8
Nacional	2010–11	Uruguayan Primera División	13	3	—		—		2	0	—		15	3
Career total			367	76	20	5	1	0	105	20	1	0	494	102

=== International ===
Appearances and goals by national team and year
National team	Year	Apps	Goals
Argentina	1994	2	0
Argentina	1995	11	5
Argentina	1996	0	0
Argentina	1997	8	5
Argentina	1998	9	0
Argentina	1999	4	0
Argentina	2000	2	1
Argentina	2001	5	2
Argentina	2002	1	0
Argentina	2003	2	0
Total		44	13

Scores and results list Argentina's goal tally first, score column indicates score after each Gallardo goal.

List of international goals scored by Marcelo Gallardo
No.	Date	Venue	Opponent	Score	Result	Competition
1	14 February 1995	Estadio Malvinas Argentinas, Mendoza, Argentina	Bulgaria	1–0	4–1	Friendly
2	14 February 1995	Estadio Malvinas Argentinas, Mendoza, Argentina	Bulgaria	2–0	4–1	Friendly
3	13 May 1995	Ellis Park Stadium, Johannesburg, South Africa	South Africa	1–1	1–1	Friendly
4	21 June 1995	Estadio Malvinas Argentinas, Mendoza, Argentina	Slovakia	1–0	6–0	Friendly
5	21 June 1995	Estadio Malvinas Argentinas, Mendoza, Argentina	Slovakia	4–0	6–0	Friendly
6	14 June 1997	Estadio Félix Capriles, Cochabamba, Bolivia	Chile	2–0	2–0	1997 Copa América
7	17 June 1997	Estadio Félix Capriles, Cochabamba, Bolivia	Paraguay	1–1	1–1	1997 Copa América
8	21 June 1997	Estadio Olímpico Patria, Sucre, Bolivia	Peru	1–2	1–2	1997 Copa América
9	6 July 1997	Estadio Defensores del Chaco, Asunción, Paraguay	Paraguay	1–0	2–1	1998 FIFA World Cup qualification
10	10 September 1997	Estadio Nacional, Santiago, Chile	Chile	1–0	2–1	1998 FIFA World Cup qualification
11	8 October 2000	Estadio Monumental, Buenos Aires, Argentina	Uruguay	1–0	2–1	2002 FIFA World Cup qualification
12	28 March 2001	Estadio Monumental, Buenos Aires, Argentina	Venezuela	4–0	5–0	2002 FIFA World Cup qualification
13	5 September 2001	Estadio Monumental, Buenos Aires, Argentina	Brazil	1–1	2–1	2002 FIFA World Cup qualification

== Managerial statistics ==
As of 17 November 2026

Managerial record by team and tenure
Team	Nat	From	To	Record							
Team	Nat	From	To	M	W	D	L	GF	GA	GD	Win %
Nacional	(Uruguay)	29 June 2011	19 June 2012	39	23	7	9	74	41	+33	58.97
River Plate	(Argentina)	30 May 2014	13 November 2022	424	228	111	85	755	366	+389	53.77
Al-Ittihad	(Saudi Arabia)	18 November 2023	2 July 2024	33	15	4	14	56	59	−3	45.45
River Plate	(Argentina)	5 August 2024	26 February 2026	86	36	32	18	110	69	+41	41.86
Ecuador	(Ecuador)	13 September 2026	present	5	2	2	1	5	4	+1	40.00
Total				587	304	156	127	1,000	539	+461	51.79

== Honours ==
As of 18 December 2021

=== Player ===
River Plate

- Argentine Primera División: 1993 Apertura, 1994 Apertura, 1996 Apertura, 1997 Apertura, 1997 Clausura, 2004 Clausura
- Copa Libertadores: 1996
- Supercopa Libertadores: 1997

Monaco

- French Division 1: 1999–2000
- Coupe de la Ligue: 2002–03
- Trophée des Champions: 2000

Paris Saint-Germain

- Coupe de la Ligue: 2007–08

D.C. United

- U.S. Open Cup: 2008

Nacional

- Uruguayan Primera División: 2010–11

Argentina

- Olympic Silver Medal: 1996
- Pan American Games: 1995 Mar del Plata
- FIFA Confederations Cup runner-up:1995

Individual

- French Division 1 Player of the year: 2000
- South American Team of the Year: 1997, 1998

=== Manager ===
Nacional

- Uruguayan Primera División: 2011–12

River Plate

- Argentine Primera División: 2021
- Copa Argentina: 2015–16, 2016–17, 2018–19
- Supercopa Argentina: 2017, 2019
- Trofeo de Campeones de la Liga Profesional: 2021
- Copa Libertadores: 2015, 2018; runner-up: 2019
- Copa Sudamericana: 2014
- Recopa Sudamericana: 2015, 2016, 2019
- Suruga Bank Championship: 2015
- Supercopa Euroamericana: 2015
- FIFA Club World Cup runner-up: 2015

Individual

- South American Coach of the Year: 2018, 2019, 2020
