= Luis Rodriguez =

Luis Rodriguez may refer to:

== Arts and entertainment ==
- Luis Rodríguez (producer) (born 1948), Spanish record producer based in Germany
- Luis J. Rodriguez (born 1954), American poet and novelist
- Luis Rodríguez (born 1978), Puerto Rican singer and songwriter known professionally as Luis Fonsi
- Luis Rodriguez, a human character on Sesame Street, played by Emilio Delgado
- Luis Rodríguez Figueroa (1875–1936), Spanish poet, historian and politician, executed by Francoist Spain

== Politics and government ==
- Luis Rodríguez Herrera (1843–1929), Chilean politician, minister of foreign affairs in 1901
- Luis Rodríguez de Miguel (1910–1982), Spanish politician and jurist
- Luis Rodríguez Quezada (1905–1975), Chilean journalist and politician
- Luis Rodríguez-Varela (1768–1826), Philippine protonationalist
- Luis Rodríguez Velasco (1838–1919), Chilean writer and politician, minister of justice in 1890
- Luis Rodríguez de Viguri (1881–1945), Spanish politician
- Luis Orlando Rodríguez (politician) (1912–1989), Cuban journalist, politician and interior minister and the first commentator of Radio Rebelde

== Science and academia ==
- Luis Rodríguez Zúñiga (1942–1991), Spanish sociologist
- Luis Felipe Rodríguez (born 1948), Mexican astronomer, member of the Colegio Nacional

== Sports ==
=== Association football (soccer) ===
- Luisín Rodríguez (1910–1990) Spanish footballer, player and manager of CD Logroñés
- Luis Rodríguez (Chilean footballer) (born 1961)
- Luis Rodriguez de la Rosa (born 1979), referee in the 2009–10 CONCACAF Champions League group stage
- Luis Rodríguez (Guatemalan footballer) (born 1982), Guatemalan football player
- Luis Antonio Rodríguez (born 1985), Argentine football player
- Luis Sánchez Rodríguez (born 1988), Mexican footballer
- Luis Rodríguez (footballer, born 1991) (born 1991), Mexican football player
- Luis Eduardo Rodríguez (born 1991), Mexican football player
- Luis Rodríguez (born 1992), member of the Costa Rican team in the 2009 FIFA under-17 world cup
- Luis Rodríguez (Bolivian footballer) (born 1994), Bolivian football left-back
- Luis Rodríguez (footballer, born October 1994), Mexican football midfielder for Chiapas
- Luis Rodríguez (Colombian footballer) (born 1995)

=== Other sports ===
- Luis Rodriguez Olmo (1919–2017), Puerto Rican baseball player
- Luis Manuel Rodríguez (1937–1996), Cuban boxer
- Luis Rodríguez (Venezuelan boxer) (born 1947), Venezuelan boxer
- Luis Rodríguez (sprinter) (born 1966), Spanish athlete
- Luis Rodríguez (volleyball) (born 1969), Puerto Rican volleyball player
- Luis Rodríguez (baseball) (born 1980), Venezuelan baseball player
- Burrulote Rodríguez (1902–1964), born Luis Ernesto Rodríguez, Dominican baseball player and manager

== See also ==
- Luis Miguel Rodríguez (disambiguation)
- José Luis Rodríguez (disambiguation)
