= Alejandro Rodríguez =

Alejandro Rodríguez may refer to:

- Alejandro Rodríguez (cyclist), Colombian road cyclist, competed in the 1998 Vuelta a Colombia
- Alejandro Rodríguez (footballer, born 1964), Spanish footballer
- Alejandro Rodríguez (footballer, born 1986), Uruguayan footballer
- Alejandro Rodríguez (footballer, born 1991), Spanish footballer
- Alejandro Rodriguez Jr. (born 1993), American soccer player
- Alejandro Rodríguez Luis (born 1957), Mexican politician
- Alejandro Rodríguez (politician) (born 1965), Argentine politician
- Alejandro Rodriguez (psychiatrist) (1918–2012), Venezuelan psychiatrist
- Alejandro Rodríguez (runner) (born 1989), Spanish runner and competitor at the 2014 IAAF World Relays – Men's 4 × 800 metres relay
- Alejandro Rodríguez (table tennis) (born 1978), Chilean table tennis player
- Alejandro Rodríguez de Valcárcel (1917–1976), Spanish politician and functionary
- Alejandro Rodríguez Velazco, (1852–1915), Cuban soldier and politician, mayor of Havana in 1900–1901

== See also ==
- Alejandro Casona (1903–1965), Spanish poet and playwright, born Alejandro Rodríguez Álvarez
