= Felipe Rodríguez =

Felipe Rodríguez may refer to:

- Felipe Rodríguez (composer) (1759/60–1814/15), Spanish classical era composer
- Felipe Rodríguez (singer) (1926–1999), Puerto Rico singer of boleros
- Felipe Rodriguez (soccer, born 1975), retired American soccer midfielder
- Felipe Rodríguez (footballer, born 1990), Uruguayan football midfielder
