= Marcos Rodriguez =

Marcos Rodriguez may refer to:

- Marcos A. Rodriguez (born 1958), Cuban-American entrepreneur and producer
- Marcos Rodriguez, a member of the Spanish DJ and singing duo Magan & Rodriguez
- Marcos Rodriguez Ema, Puerto Rican Chief of Staff
- Marcos Rodríguez Pantoja (1946–2026), Spanish feral child

== See also ==
- Rodriguez (disambiguation)
- Marco Rodríguez (disambiguation)
- Marcos (given name)
