= National Electoral Court of Bolivia =

1956–2010 electoral court in Bolivia

The National Electoral Court (Spanish: Corte Nacional Electoral) was the government-appointed court which oversaw elections and electoral results at all levels of Bolivian government from 1956 to 2010, and supervised nine Departmental Electoral Courts in each department. It was founded in February 1956 to organize the national elections of that year, and acted as the supervising body of all elections until it was replaced in August 2010 by the Plurinational Electoral Organ, a fourth branch of government headed by the Supreme Electoral Tribunal.

== List of chairpersons of the CNE ==
- Salvador Romero (?-2008)
- José Luis Exeni (2008–2010)

== See also ==
- Elections in Bolivia
