= José Luis Rodríguez =

José Luis Rodríguez may refer to:

== First surname ==
- José Luis Rodríguez Aguilar (born 1994), Chilean cyclist
- José Luis Rodríguez Bebanz (born 1997), Uruguayan footballer
- José Luis Rodríguez Francis (born 1998), Panamanian footballer
- José Luis Rodríguez García (born 1946), Cuban politician
- José Luis Rodríguez Jiménez (born 1961), Spanish historian
- José Luis Rodríguez Pittí (born 1971), Panamanian writer, documentary photographer, and computer systems engineer
- José Luis Rodríguez Vélez (1915–1984), Panamanian musician
- José Luis Rodríguez Zapatero (born 1960), former Prime Minister of Spain (2004–2011)
- José Luis Rodríguez (footballer, born 1963), El Puma, former Argentine football striker
- José Luis Rodríguez (singer) (born 1943), El Puma, Venezuelan singer and actor

== Second surname ==
- José Luis Deus Rodríguez (born 1977), Spanish former footballer
- José Luis Exeni Rodríguez (born 1968), Bolivian former chief judge
- José Luis Lopátegui Rodríguez (1940–2002), Spanish musician, classical guitarist, and professor
- José Luis Loreto (José Luis Rodríguez Loreto, born 1971), former Spanish football striker
- José Luis Purcell Rodríguez (1914–1996), Puerto Rican Superior Court judge
- José Luis Sandoval Rodríguez (born 1968), Mexican professional baseball coach and former player

== See also ==
- Jose Rodríguez (disambiguation)
- Luis Rodriguez (disambiguation)
