= Héctor Rodríguez =

Héctor Rodríguez may refer to:

- Héctor Rodríguez de la Sotta (1887–1967), Chilean conservative politician
- Héctor Rodríguez (baseball) (1920–2003), Major League Baseball third baseman
- Héctor Rodríguez (equestrian) (born 1936), Colombian Olympic equestrian
- Héctor Rodríguez (judoka) (born 1951), Cuban judoka
- Héctor Rodríguez (basketball) (born 1952), Mexican Olympic basketball player
- Héctor Rodríguez (footballer) (born 1968), Uruguayan footballer
- Héctor Rodríguez Castro, (born 1982) Venezuelan politician
- Héctor Francisco Rodríguez (born 1982), Honduran football referee
- Héctor Rodríguez (outfielder) (born 2004)
- Héctor Moreira Rodríguez, Mexican academic and politician

== See also ==
- Rodríguez (surname)
