= Mauricio Rodríguez =

Mauricio Rodríguez may refer to:

- Mauricio Alonso Rodríguez (born 1945), Salvadoran football player and manager
- Mauricio Rodriguez Anza, Mexican architect and designer
- Mauricio Rodriguez, vocalist and frontman of Mauricio & Palodeagua
- Mauricio Rodríguez (composer), Mexican-American musician.
- Mauricio Rodríguez (athlete), Venezuelan discus thrower
- Mauricio Rodríguez Múnera (born 1958), Colombian journalist and ambassador.
- Mauricio Rodríguez (politician), Venezuelan Minister of Communications and Information
