= Ansah =

Ansah might refer to:

== Surname ==
- Andy Ansah (born 1969), English footballer
- Akwasi Owusu-Ansah (born 1988), American football player
- Aziz Ansah (born 1980), Ghanaian footballer
- Edmund Owusu-Ansah (born 1983), Ghanaian footballer
- Ezekiel Ansah (born 1989), American football player
- Ilyas Ansah (born 2004), German footballer
- James Owusu-Ansah (born 1981), Ghanaian footballer
- Joey Ansah (born 1982), English actor and martial artist
- Kwaw Ansah (born 1982), Ghanaian film director
- Maxwell Ansah better known as Lethal Bizzle (born 1984), English musician
- Michael Paul Ansah (born 1928), Ghanaian politician; member of parliament during the first republic and minister of state during the third republic
- Owen Ansah (born 2000), German sprinter
- Owusu-Ansah Kontoh (born 1992), Ghanaian footballer
- Princeton Owusu-Ansah (born 1976), Ghanaian footballer
- Sandra Owusu-Ansah (born 2000), Ghanaian professional footballer
- Timothy Ansah (1919–2008), Ghanaian politician; member of parliament during the first republic
- William Ansah Sessarakoo (1736–1749), Ghanaian businessman
- Zak Ansah (born 1994), English football player

== Given name ==
- Ansah Owusu (born 1979), English footballer

== See also ==
- Ansa (disambiguation)
- Anza (disambiguation)
