= Jorge García Carneiro =

Venezuelan politician (1952–2021)

3rd Governor of Vargas
- In office 28 November 2008 – 22 May 2021
- Preceded by: Antonio Rodríguez San Juan
- Succeeded by: José Manuel Suárez

Minister of Defense
- In office 8 January 2004 – 25 December 2006
- President: Hugo Chavez
- Preceded by: José Luís Prieto
- Succeeded by: Raúl Baduel

Personal details
- Born: 8 February 1952 Caracas, Venezuela
- Died: 22 May 2021 (aged 69)
- Party: Fifth Republic Movement (MVR); United Socialist Party of Venezuela (PSUV)
- Spouse: María del Valle de García
- Profession: Politician

Jorge Luis García Carneiro (8 February 1952 – 22 May 2021) was a Venezuelan politician. He was elected the governor of Vargas in 2008, having previously been head of the Venezuelan Army, Minister of Defense, and Minister for Social Development and Popular Participation. He was a member of the United Socialist Party of Venezuela (PSUV) of Venezuela's late president, Hugo Chávez.

== Biography ==
García Carneiro graduated from the Military Academy of Venezuela in 1975. During the 2002 Venezuelan coup d'état attempt, as the general in charge of the largest military unit in Caracas, he was taken prisoner at Fort Tiuna.

García Carneiro was the head of the Venezuelan Army from January 2003 to January 2004, when he became Minister of Defense. He held this position until December 2006.

On 22 May 2021, Delcy Rodríguez announced his death.

== Sanctions ==
On 25 February 2019, the Office of Foreign Assets Control (OFAC) of the United States Department of the Treasury placed sanctions in effect against García Carneiro and governors of 3 other Venezuelan states for alleged involvement in corruption and in blocking the delivery of humanitarian aid.

García Carneiro was sanctioned by the Canadian government on 15 April 2019 under the Special Economic Measures Act. The government statement said "the sanctions hit high ranking officials of the Maduro regime, regional governors, and people directly implicated in activities undermining democratic institutions". Foreign Minister Chrystia Freeland stated, "The Maduro dictatorship must be held accountable for this crisis and depriving Venezuelans of their most basic rights and needs. Canada is committed to supporting the peaceful restoration of constitutional democracy in Venezuela."
