= Fernando Rodríguez =

Fernando Rodríguez may refer to:

- Fernando Rodríguez de Castro (1125–1185), Castilian nobleman
- Fernando Rodríguez de Castro (died 1304), Galician nobleman
- Fernando E. Rodríguez Vargas (1888–1932), dentist, scientist and army major
- Fernando Rodriguez (baseball) (born 1984), American baseball pitcher
- Freddy Rodríguez (baseball) (1924–2009), former pitcher in Major League Baseball
- Fernando Rodríguez (Argentine footballer) (born 1976), Argentine football forward
- Fernando Rodríguez (Spanish footballer) (born 1987), Spanish footballer
- Fernando Rodríguez (swimmer) (born 1963), Peruvian swimmer
- Fernando Rodríguez (bobsleigh) (born 1931), Argentine Olympic bobsledder
- Fernando Rodriguez Jr. (born 1969), United States District Judge
