= Daniel Rodríguez =

Daniel Rodríguez may refer to:

== Academics ==
- Daniel B. Rodriguez, dean and professor at the Northwestern University Pritzker School of Law

== Artists and musicians ==
- Daniel Rodríguez (tenor) (born 1964), Puerto Rican-American operatic tenor
- Daniel Rodríguez (singer), singer with MDO
- Danny Rodriguez (1967–1990), Christian rap artist

== Sportspeople ==
=== Association footballers ===
- Coquito (footballer) (born 1965), born Daniel Gregorio Rodríguez Lima, Uruguayan football forward
- Txiki (footballer, born 1977), Daniel Rodríguez Pérez, Spanish football winger
- Toti (footballer, born 1987), Daniel García Rodríguez, Spanish football attacking midfielder
- Dani Rodríguez (born 1988), Spanish football central midfielder

=== Other sports ===
- Daniel Rodríguez (baseball) (born 1984), baseball player
- Daniel Rodríguez Martín (born 1984), Spanish wheelchair basketball player
- Daniel Rodriguez (fighter) (born 1986), American mixed martial artist
- Dani Rodriguez (fighter) (born 1998), Swiss mixed martial artist

== See also ==
- Daniel Rodrigues (disambiguation)
