= Daniel B. Rodriguez =

Dean and Harold Washington Professor Northwestern University Pritzker School of Law
- In office January 1, 2012 – September 1, 2018
- Preceded by: David E. Van Zandt
- Succeeded by: Kimberly Yuracko

Personal details
- Education: California State University, Long Beach (B.A.); Harvard University (J.D.)
- Occupation: Professor; Lawyer; Administrator
- Website: Daniel B. Rodriguez

Daniel B. Rodriguez is the former Dean of Northwestern University Pritzker School of Law and holds the Harold Washington Professorship. He was the 2014 President of the Association of American Law Schools (AALS), and served on the American Bar Association's Commission on the Future of Legal Services. He currently acts as an advisor to the ABA's Center for Legal Innovation.

Rodriguez’s principal academic work is in the areas of administrative law, local government law, and constitutional law. He also has a special interest in the law-business-technology interface and its impact on the future of legal education.

== Education ==
Rodriguez received his Juris Doctor (J.D.) degree from Harvard Law School in 1987, where he graduated cum laude. His undergraduate degree is from the California State University, Long Beach. He is a recipient of that school’s distinguished alumnus award.

After graduating from law school, Rodriguez clerked for Judge Alex Kozinski of the United States Court of Appeals for the Ninth Circuit.

== Academic career ==
Rodriguez assumed his role as Dean and Harold Washington Professor at Northwestern Law on January 1, 2012, and stepped down in 2018. Prior to his appointment at Northwestern, Rodriguez served as Minerva House Drysdale Regents Chair in Law at the University of Texas (Austin) from 2007 to 2011. While at Texas, he was also a professor of government (by courtesy) and a Research Fellow at Rice University’s Baker Institute for Public Policy.

Before joining the Texas faculty, Rodriguez served as Dean and Warren Distinguished Professor of Law at the University of San Diego School of Law. He began his academic career at the University of California, Berkeley’s Boalt Hall School of Law. In addition, he has been a visiting professor of law at Columbia University, University of Southern California, University of Illinois, and University of Virginia and also at the Free University of Amsterdam, The Netherlands.

Rodriguez is a leader in the application of political economy to the study of public law and has authored or co-authored a series of influential articles and book chapters in this vein. He has consulted with federal, state, and local agencies and with individuals and institutions in litigation and statutory drafting contexts.

Additionally, he has served in various professional leadership roles - including president of the Association of American Law Schools and a member of the Section on Administrative Law and Regulatory Practice of the American Bar Association. He was elected to the American Law Institute in 1997 and was elected to the ALI Council in 2012. He is also a fellow of the American Bar Foundation.

Dean Rodriguez hosts a monthly podcast, Planet Lex, featuring conversations about the law, law and society, law and technology, and the future of legal education and practice.

== Selected works ==
- State Constitutional Law and its Processes (Aspen Press, forthcoming, 2012)
- Losing Ground: A Nation on Edge, (co-edited with John Nolon, Pace University School of Law) (Environmental Law Institute Press, 2007)
- "Change that Matters: An Essay on State Constitutional Development", Penn St. Law Review (symposium issue) (forthcoming, 2011)
