= Isidro Rodriguez =

Isidro Rodriguez may refer to:

- Isidro Rodríguez (footballer) (1890s–unknown), Spanish footballer
- Isidro Rodriguez (politician) (1915–1992), Filipino politician and softball official
