= List of governors of Vargas =

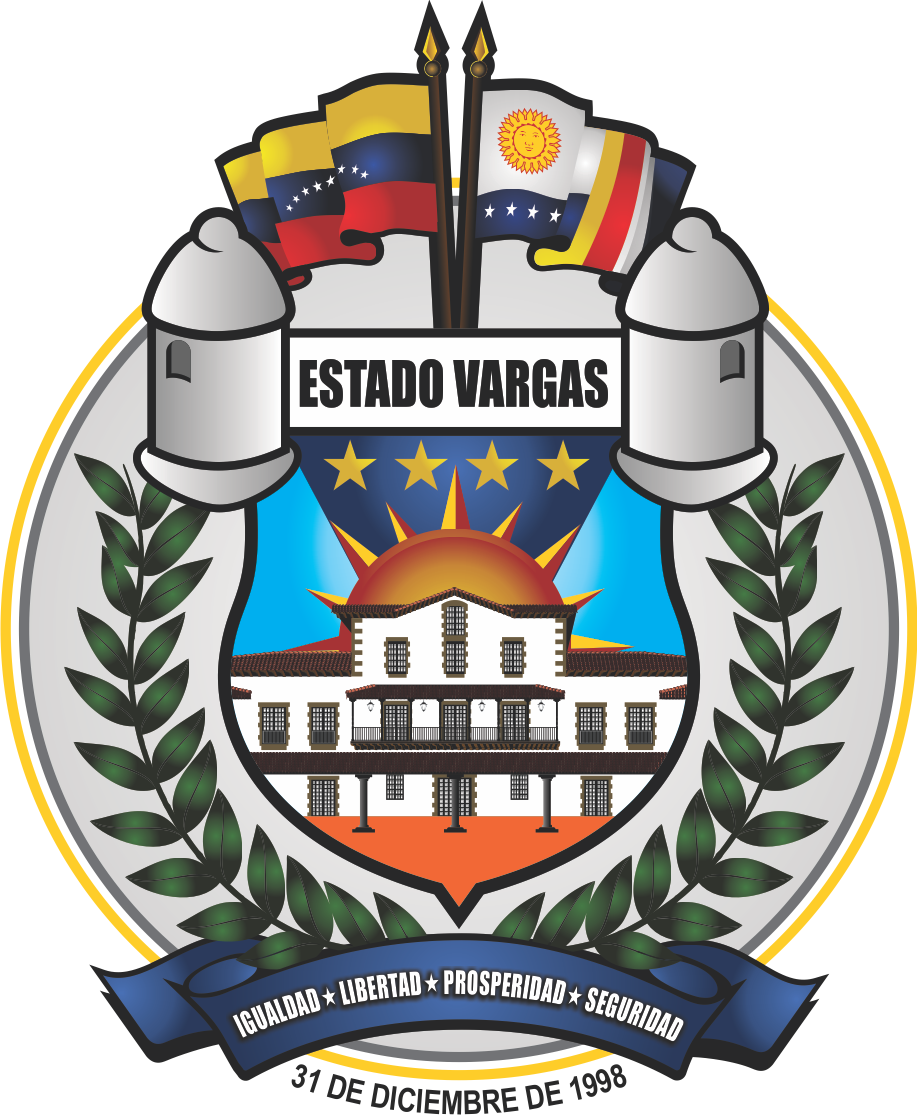
- State coat of Arms

- Flag of the State
- Incumbent; José Alejandro Terán
- Style: Governor
- Status: Head of State
- Term length: Four years

This is a list of governors of Vargas in Venezuela. The state was created in 1998, the territory having previously been part of the Federal District.

== List of governors ==
Vargas' bid for statehood was approved in 1998.

Took office	Left office	Governor	Vote
1998	2000	Alfredo Laya, PPT	39.27
2000	2004	Antonio Rodríguez San Juan, MVR	59.76
2004	2008	Antonio Rodríguez San Juan, MVR	55.22
2008	2012	Jorge García Carneiro, PSUV	61.56
2012	2017	Jorge García Carneiro, PSUV	73.44
2017	2021	Jorge García Carneiro, PSUV	52,98
2021	2021	José Manuel Suárez, PSUV	N/A
2021	2025	José Alejandro Terán, PSUV	50,12
2025	2029	José Alejandro Terán, GPPSB	90,65
