= Alberto Rodríguez =

Alberto Rodríguez may refer to:

- Alberto Rodríguez Acosta (1869–1897), Cuban general
- Alberto Rodríguez Larreta (1934–1977), Argentine racing driver
- Alberto Rodríguez (cyclist) (born 1947), Uruguayan Olympic cyclist
- Alberto Rodríguez Saá (born 1949), Argentine politician
- Alberto Rodriguez (FALN) (born 1953), Puerto Rican nationalist
- Alberto Rodríguez (wrestler) (born 1964), Cuban Olympic wrestler
- Alberto Rodríguez Librero (born 1971), Spanish film director
- Alberto Rodríguez Barrera (born 1974), Mexican football player
- Alberto Del Rio (Alberto Rodríguez, born 1977), Mexican professional wrestler
- Alberto Rodríguez Almeida (born 1978), Spanish politician
- Alberto Rodríguez Oliver (born 1982), Spanish professional road racing cyclist
- Alberto Rodríguez (footballer, born 1984), Peruvian football player
- Alberto Rodríguez (footballer, born 1992), Spanish football centre-back
- Alberto Rodríguez (footballer, born 1997), Spanish football centre-back
- Alberto Rodríguez (baseball) (born 2000)
