= Antonio Rodríguez =

Antonio or Tony Rodríguez may refer to:

== Sportspeople ==
- Antonio Rodríguez (baseball) (1915–?), Cuban professional baseball player
- Antonio Rodríguez (volleyball) (born 1951), Cuban former volleyball player
- Antonio Rodríguez Cabo (born 1969), retired Spanish footballer
- Antonio Rodríguez Dovale (born 1990), Spanish footballer for Celta de Vigo
- Antonio Rodríguez Martínez (born 1979), Spanish footballer for Granada CF
- Tony Rodríguez (baseball) (Luis Antonio Rodríguez, born 1970), Puerto Rican Major League Baseball infielder
- Antonio Rodríguez Saravia (born 1971), Spanish footballer
- Antonio Rodríguez (athlete), Costa Rican distance runner, competed in athletics at the 1930 Central American and Caribbean Games
- António Rodrigues (1905–1994), Portuguese sprinter
- José Antonio Rodríguez (Mexican footballer) (born 1992), Mexican footballer for Club Tijuana

== Composers ==
- Antonio Rodríguez Ferrer (1864–1935), Cuban composer and band conductor
- Antonio Rodríguez de Hita (1722–1787), Spanish composer

== Others ==
- Antonio Rodriguez (entrepreneur), Venezuelan serial entrepreneur and venture capitalist
- Antonio Rodriguez (serial killer), U.S. serial killer, known as the "Kensington Strangler"
- Antonio Rodríguez Balinas (1928–2011), brigadier general of United States Army
- Antonio Rodríguez Luna (1910–1985), Spanish painter
- Antonio Rodríguez Medero (1712–1760), Spanish colonial agent, one of the founders of San Antonio, Texas
- Antonio Rodríguez Rodríguez (1944–2026), Spanish politician
- Antonio Rodríguez Salvador (born 1960), poet, fiction writer, dramatist and essayist
- Antonio Rodríguez San Juan (born 1957), governor of Vargas State, Venezuela, since 2001
- Tony Rodriguez (criminal) (Anthony or Antonio Rodriguez), crime family mob associate
- Antonio Orlando Rodríguez (born 1956), Cuban writer, journalist and critic
- Tony R. Rodriguez, American novelist

== Fictional characters ==
- Tony Rodriguez (NYPD Blue), a character on the television drama NYPD Blue
