= Josep Maria Trigo Rodríguez =

Spanish astronomy researcher

Josep Maria Trigo Rodríguez (born 3 July 1970) is a Spanish astronomer, astrophysicist and science writer. His work focuses on the early development of the Solar System. He is the cofounder of the Spanish Meteor Network.

== Biography ==
Trigo Rodríguez was born in Valencia, Spain. He grew up reading Isaac Asimov, Josep Comas Solà, Camille Flammarion, and Carl Sagan. He studied at Universidad de Valencia where he earned his Ph.D. in 2002.

Trigo Rodríguez researched primitive Solar System materials (meteorites) at the Institute of Geophysics and Planetary Physics of the University of California, Los Angeles (UCLA) from 2003 to 2005.

In 2011 he is a tenured scientist of the Spanish National Research Council (CSIC) at the Institute of Space Sciences in Barcelona, Spain, where he continues to study meteorites and comets and their paths in the solar system. In 2012 the Minor Planet Center named Main Belt asteroid 8325 Trigo-Rodríguez after him. He is also the head of the Spanish Meteor Network, which watches the skies in order to recover and study meteorites.

In 2016 Trigo Rodriguez conducted research on cosmic debris of Martian origin. His study was funded by the Spanish Ministry of Sciences.
