= Pablo Rodríguez (footballer, born 1973) =

Mexican footballer

Personal information
- Full name: Pablo de Jesus Rodríguez Alvarez
- Date of birth: 29 June 1973 (age 53)
- Place of birth: Puebla, Mexico
- Height: 1.78 m (5 ft 10 in)
- Positions: Defender; midfielder

Senior career*
Years	Team	Apps	(Gls)
1992–1993	Pachuca	1	(0)
1993–1996	Puebla	23	(0)
1996–1997	Correcaminos	35	(6)
2000	Atlas	1	(0)
- * Club domestic league appearances and goals

Pablo de Jesus Rodríguez Alvarez, known as Pablo Rodríguez (born 29 June 1973 in Puebla) is a retired Mexican professional footballer. He played on the professional level in Liga MX for C.F. Pachuca, Puebla F.C. and F.C. Atlas.
