= Alejandro Rodriguez Jr. =

American soccer player

Alejandro Rodriguez Jr
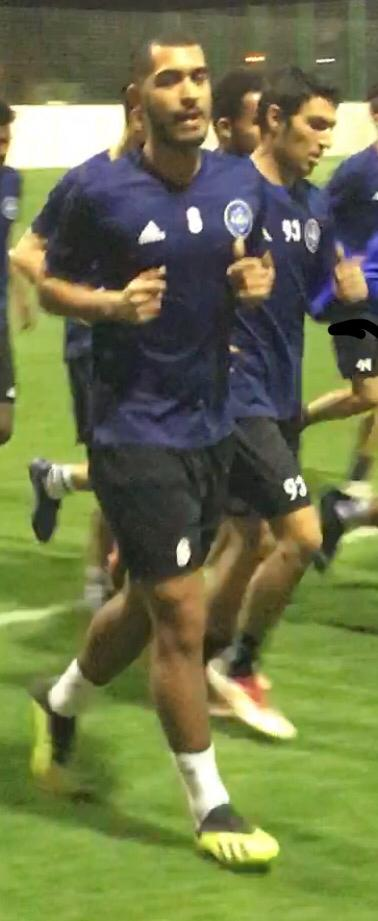
- Training with Al-Sailiya SC in 2019

Personal information
- Date of birth: March 21, 1993 (age 33)
- Place of birth: Miami, Florida, U.S.
- Height: 5 ft 10 in (1.78 m)
- Positions: Attacking midfielder; winger

Team information
- Current team: Wa All Stars FC
- Number: 7

Youth career
- 2007–2011: Felix Varela High School
- 2011–2012: Florida Atlantic University

Senior career*
Years	Team	Apps	(Gls)
2013–2015	Vaqueros F.C.	39	(13)
2015	Chicago Fire U-23	4	(7)
2016–2017	Miami United FC	21	(7)
2018–	Wa All Stars FC	13	(6)
- * Club domestic league appearances and goals

Alejandro Rodriguez Jr (born March 21, 1993) is an American professional soccer player who plays for Wa All Stars FC in the Ghana Premier League. He plays as an attacking midfielder, and is also a winger. He is known for his combination of vision, passing, dribbling and technical ability.

== Early career ==
Rodriguez began his youth career under the guidance of Luis Carlos Perea, who represented Colombia at the 1990 FIFA World Cup and 1994 FIFA World Cup. Rodriguez played soccer at Felix Varela High School, representing the Vipers from 2007 to 2011. He won a National Championship with now head coach of FC Dallas Luchi Gonzalez. Rodriguez helped the Vipers to three State Final four appearances including a national championship in 2008, a state semifinal appearance in 2009, and state finalist in 2011.

Rodriguez joined the Florida Atlantic University men's soccer team for one season highlighted by scoring a last-minute game-winner vs Howard University in the 2011–2012 season.

== Senior career ==
After his freshman season at Florida Atlantic University, Rodriguez was invited to trials with three Spanish clubs: Real Valladolid, CD Cristo Atletico, and FC Santboia. Rodriguez received two offers from the three clubs but decided to not pursue football in Spain for personal family reasons.

In 2017 Rodriguez joined NPSL club Miami United FC under former Juventus F.C and Japan national football team assistant coach.

In 2018, Rodriguez signed a contract with the Ghanaian Premier League club and helped his side Wa All Stars FC win its first trophy of the year the Star Times Gala.
