= Luis Miguel Rodríguez =

Luis Miguel Rodríguez may refer to:

- Luis Miguel Rodríguez (baseball), Cuban baseball player
- Luis Miguel Rodríguez (footballer), Argentine footballer known as la pulga (the flea)
