= David Rodríguez Rivera =

Salvadoran priest and politician

José David Rodríguez Rivera, commonly known as "Padre David," is a Salvadoran priest who in the early 1970s embraced liberation theology and began to train lay Christian leaders and create Christian base communities for the purpose of helping the poor of the country to demand their economic and political rights. These actions raised the ire of the country's oligarchy which controlled the Salvadoran government and thus Rodríguez, along with other liberationist priests and nuns, became a target of the state. After the government's national guard killed six peasants in the small town of La Cayetana, a community that Padre David had organized, Rodríguez decided to join one of the so-called politico-military organizations, the Popular Liberation Forces, or FPL. As the conflict between the state and the opposition groups in the country escalated, the country plunged into civil war in 1980. The five existing politico-military organizations at the time then formed the Farabundo Martí National Liberation Front, or FMLN. Padre Rodríguez, as an FPL member, also became active in the FMLN, performing a number of roles during the twelve-year civil war. Though not a combatant, his involvement in the FPL and FMLN included organizing Christians who supported the revolutionary movement, working with the so-called Local Popular Powers (the governing organizations in the guerrilla-controlled zones), and helping to finance the civial war and displaced communities in the country. During the civil war, Padre Rodríguez also functioned as a priest for those who lived in the zones controlled by the guerrillas.

After the end of the civil war, in 1992, Padre Rodríguez, desired to return to the church but the bishop of San Vicente, the diocese where he had served as a priest, demanded that he apologize for the actions he had taken as a revolutionary priest. Rodríguez could not accept this condition so he returned to the FMLN which was now becoming a legal political party. Owing to his popularity in San Vicente and in most parts of the country, Rodríguez has been elected four times to the country's Legislative Assembly as an FMLN deputy (representative) from the Department of La Paz (a department within the diocese of San Vicente). His current term in the Assembly has ended in 2015.
