= Alberto Rodriguez (FALN) =

Puerto Rican activist (born 1953)

Alberto Rodriguez (born 1953) was a Puerto Rican member of the FALN who received a sentence of 35 years for seditious conspiracy and other charges. He was sentenced in 1985, and incarcerated first at United States Penitentiary in Lewisburg, PA, and later at the federal penitentiary at USP Beaumont, TX. However, he was released early from prison, after President Bill Clinton extended a clemency offer in August 1999. Alberto and 10 other Puerto Rican prisoners were released on September 10, 1999.

== Early years and personal life ==
Alberto was born in 1953 in Bronx, New York and was raised in Chicago. While he was in high school he became part of a new generation of Puerto Ricans in the United States who demanded that their history and culture be recognized and joined the Puerto Rican Independence Movement. In the early 1970s Puerto Rican students were using the tactics of sit-ins and civil disobedience, to force the Chicago Board of Education to be more responsive to the needs of Latino students. Alberto entered the University of Illinois, Chicago in 1972, and immediately became involved in student struggles for a Latin American studies program and for recruitment of Latino students.

Upon graduation in 1976 he began to work for community programs, such as the Borinqueña Learning Center, which provided opportunities for working adults to pursue educational goals. He also worked in various community organizations including the Workers Rights Center, El Comite Pro-Orientacion Comunal, El Desfile del Pueblo, Latino Cultural Center and the Puerto Rican Cultural Center. At the time of his arrest he was married and the father of two children.

== Seditious conspiracy ==
When arrested in 1983 Alberto was working as an academic counselor at Northeastern Illinois University and was completing his thesis requirements for a graduate degree from Governors State University. He was convicted of seditious conspiracy and sentenced to 35 years. Rodriguez and three others were arrested in various locations around Chicago on June 29, 1983. Alberto Rodriguez, Edwin Cortes and Jose Luis Rodriguez were given a $10 million bond while Alejandrina Torres was given a $5 million bond. His first ten months in prison were in solitary confinement, where, he says, "I had to search within myself to find the spiritual strength to persevere." A federal judge found the conditions of confinement too harsh and ordered the federal prison to place both Alberto Rodriguez and Edwin Cortes in general population though in special restrictive conditions.

A series of arrests against purported FALN members began in 1977 and culminated around 1985. Rodriguez was never charged with any bombings. During the trial proceedings from 1983 through 1985, he declared his status as prisoner of war, and refused to participate in the proceedings. Alberto Rodriguez was given a 35-year federal sentence for seditious conspiracy and other charges.

Among the other convicted Puerto Rican nationalists there were sentences of as long as 90 years in Federal prisons for offenses including seditious conspiracy, possession of unregistered firearms, interstate transportation of a stolen vehicle, interference with interstate commerce by violence and interstate transportation of firearms with intent to commit a crime. None of those granted clemency were convicted in any of the actual bombings, including Rodriguez. Rather, they had been convicted on a variety of conspiracy charges ranging from conspiracy to make bombs, conspiracy to armed robbery and various firearms violations. They were all convicted for seditious conspiracy, conspiracy to oppose the authority of the Government of the United States in Puerto Rico by force.

== Political prisoner ==
At the time of their arrest Rodriguez and the others declared themselves to be combatants in an anti-colonial war against the United States to liberate Puerto Rico from U.S. domination and invoked prisoner of war status. They argued that the U.S. courts did not have jurisdiction to try them as criminals and petitioned for their cases to be handed over to an international court that would determine their status. The U.S. Government, however, did not recognize their request.

The sentences received by Rodriguez and the other Nationalists were judged to be "out of proportion to the nationalists' offenses." Statistics showed their sentences were almost 20 times greater than sentences for similar offenses by the American population at large.

For many years, numerous national and international organizations criticized Rodriguez' incarceration categorizing it as political imprisonment. Alberto Rodriguez was finally released from prison on September 10, 1999, after President Bill Clinton extended him clemency. Clinton cited Rev. Desmond Tutu and former President Jimmy Carter as having been influential on his decision to grant Rodriguez the clemency offer. Cases involving the release of other Puerto Rican Nationalist prisoners have also been categorized as cases of political prisoners, with some being more vocal than others.

In criticizing President Clinton's decision to release the Puerto Rican prisoners, the conservative U.S. Senate Republican Policy Committee also categorized Rodriguez as a "Puerto Rican Nationalist", echoing a recent Newsweek article. In 2006, the United Nations called for the release of the remaining Puerto Rican political prisoners in United States prisons.

Alberto now works for the People's Law Office in Chicago. He remarried in 2003.

== See also ==
- Oscar López Rivera
- Carlos Alberto Torres
- Juan Enrique Segarra-Palmer
- Edwin Cortes
- Pedro Albizu Campos
- Oscar Collazo
- Lolita Lebrón
- Puerto Rican independence movement
- Rafael Cancel Miranda
