= José Luis Exeni =

Bolivian writer and journalist

José Luis Exeni Rodríguez (born 1968, in La Paz, Bolivia) is the former chief judge of the National Electoral Court of Bolivia.

Exeni is a member of the Church of Jesus Christ of Latter-day Saints.
