= Kimberly Yuracko =

- Born: 1969 (age 56–57)

Academic background
- Education: Stanford University (BA, JD, PhD)

Academic work
- Discipline: Law; Political science
- Sub-discipline: Gender
- Institutions: Northwestern University

Kimberly A. Yuracko (born 1969) is an American law professor and academic administrator. She is the Judd and Mary Morris Leighton Professor of Law at Northwestern University Pritzker School of Law and Associate Provost for Academic Projects. She previously served as Dean of the Pritzker School of Law. She is an expert on gender and Title IX.

== Career ==
Yuracko graduated from Stanford Law School with a Juris Doctor in 1998, and also obtained a Doctor of Philosophy in political science from Stanford University. She clerked for Judge Gary L. Taylor at the U.S. District Court for the Central District of California, and later for Judge Stanley Marcus at the U.S. Court of Appeals for the Eleventh Circuit.

In 2002, Yuracko joined Northwestern Pritzker School of Law and has since held a joint appointment in political science with Northwestern University's Weinberg College of Arts and Sciences. She was associate dean for academic affairs from 2009 to 2010 and served as interim dean in 2011. In 2018, she was appointed dean of Pritzker Law School. She was appointed Associate Provost for Academic Projects starting August 1, 2020.

== Personal life ==
Yuracko has two children with her former husband Michael Barsa, who is a law professor and novelist.

== Works ==
- Perfectionism and Contemporary Feminist Values. Indiana University Press. 2003. ISBN 978-0-253-10972-9. OCLC 611966065.
- Gender Nonconformity and the Law. Yale University Press. 2016. ISBN 978-0-300-21785-8. OCLC 976514177.
- Mark A Rothstein; Lance Liebman; Kimberly A Yuracko, Employment law : cases and materials, St. Paul, MN : Foundation Press, Thomson Reuters, 2015. Eighth edition. ISBN 9781609304492, OCLC 904652224
