= Tebra =

American technology company

- Industry: Healthcare software
- Founded: November 2021
- Founder: Dan Rodrigues
- Headquarters: Newport Beach, California, United States
- Key people: Dan Rodrigues (CEO and Co-founder); Mike Doktorczyk (CFO); Kyle Ryan (Chief Product and Technology Officer); Kevin Marasco (Chief Growth Officer); Amanda Piwonka (Chief People Officer); Colin Morris (General Counsel); Andrea Weisz (Chief Customer Officer)
- Products: Electronic health records, practice management, medical billing, patient engagement
- Website: tebra.com

Tebra is an American company that develops healthcare software for independent medical practices. The company was formed in November 2021 through the merger of Kareo, an electronic healthcare records and medical billing software provider, and PatientPop, a practice growth and patient engagement platform. Tebra's integrated platform combines electronic health records, practice management, billing, marketing, and patient engagement tools. As of 2025, the platform serves over 140,000 healthcare providers covering more than 120 million patients in the United States. In 2022, the company achieved unicorn status with a valuation exceeding $1 billion following a Series B funding round.

== History ==
=== Kareo ===
In 2004, Dan Rodrigues founded Kareo and opened its first office in Irvine, California. Kareo developed a cloud-based technology platform including clinical and financial solutions for independent healthcare providers. Kareo offered electronic health records, practice management, and billing tools for independent providers. In 2018, Kareo expanded its offices to include San Diego. In 2019, Kareo processed $25 billion in insurance claims.

=== PatientPop ===
In 2014, Luke Kervin and Travis Schneider co-founded PatientPop. PatientPop focused on digital practice marketing and patient acquisition services for healthcare providers.

=== Merger ===
In November 2021, Kareo and PatientPop merged and formed Tebra, combining Kareo's clinical and financial software with PatientPop's practice growth platform. Dan Rodrigues serves as CEO, with Travis Schneider and Luke Kervin in leadership roles. On November 6, 2021, Tebra completed a Series A funding round, with Golub Capital serving as the lead investor, and raised $65 million. The startup's other investors include Commonfund, HLM Venture Partners, OpenView, StepStone Group, Stripes Group, Montreux Equity Partners, Toba Capital, Transformation Capital, and Vivo Capital.

On July 6, 2022, Tebra completed a Series B funding round led by Golub Capital, which raised $72 million. The company reached a valuation of more than $1 billion. In 2022, Tebra was named a top workplace by The Orange County Register.

In February 2023, Tebra announced the opening of another office in Costa Rica. Tebra was named on the 2023 list of top healthcare technology companies by the Healthcare Technology Report. In August 2023, Tebra launched The Intake, a resource hub providing educational content for independent medical practices.

In December 2025, Tebra raised $250 million in combined equity and debt financing to expand AI-driven automation across its electronic health record and practice-operations suite. The equity portion was led by Hildred, with a debt facility provided by J.P. Morgan. According to the company, the funding was intended to accelerate development of AI capabilities, including clinical documentation and billing automation.

== Products ==
Tebra provides an integrated software platform for independent medical practices, combining clinical, financial, and practice-management tools.

Tebra's EHR system includes customizable clinical documentation templates, e-prescribing, and lab integrations. AI Note Assist uses artificial intelligence to generate clinical notes from patient encounters. In the second half of 2025, the feature was used to generate more than 500,000 clinical notes.

The platform provides online reputation management, including automated review requests and monitoring. In October 2025, Tebra introduced AI Review Replies and AI Review Insights, automated tools for managing patient reviews. According to Tebra, the tools generated increases in online impressions and website clicks for early users. Additional marketing features include website design, search engine optimization, and social media management tools to help practices reach patients.

== Customers ==
Tebra markets its platform primarily to independent medical practices across specialties, serving a range of specialties including primary care, mental health, and family medicine in the United States. As of 2025, the platform serves over 140,000 healthcare providers covering more than 120 million patients.

Tebra describes itself as an "all-in-one provider platform" designed specifically for private practices rather than larger enterprises. Following the 2021 merger of Kareo and PatientPop, Tebra has addressed the operational needs of independent practices by offering solutions for clinical workflows, billing, and patient engagement.

The platform's target market focuses on small to medium-sized independent practices, typically with up to 10 providers. In coverage of the company's December 2025 financing round, CEO Dan Rodrigues stated that the platform was being used by practices serving approximately 90 million patients, with similar provider counts (100,000–150,000) appearing across industry publications. The company states that the $250 million equity and debt financing round, led by Hildred with a debt facility from J.P. Morgan, would be used to expand AI automation features.

== Publications ==
In August 2023, Tebra launched The Intake, a publication focused on the business of running independent healthcare practices.

Tebra has conducted surveys on healthcare industry trends, with selected findings covered by third-party publications.
