= Alejandro Rodríguez Luis =

Mexican politician

- Born: 23 January 1957 (age 69); Jalisco, Mexico
- Occupation: Politician
- Political party: PVEM

Alejandro Rodríguez Luis (born 23 January 1957) is a Mexican politician from the Ecologist Green Party of Mexico. From 2008 to 2009 he served as Deputy of the LX Legislature of the Mexican Congress representing Durango.
