= Miguel Ángel Rodríguez (disambiguation) =

Miguel Ángel Rodríguez (born 1940) is a Costa Rican economist, lawyer, businessman and politician.

Miguel Ángel Rodríguez may also refer to:

- Miguel Ángel Rodríguez (singer), Spanish actor and singer known as El Sevilla
- Miguel Ángel Rodríguez (racewalker) (born 1967), Mexican race walker
- Miguel Ángel Rodríguez (squash player) (born 1985), Colombian squash player
- Miguel Ángel Rodríguez (Mexican actor), Mexican actor, director and producer
