= Ángel Rodríguez (footballer, born 1972) =

Spanish footballer and manager

Personal information
- Full name: Ángel Ildefonso Rodríguez Nebreda
- Date of birth: 2 January 1972 (age 54)
- Place of birth: León, Spain
- Height: 1.86 m (6 ft 1 in)
- Position: Midfielder

Senior career*
Years	Team	Apps	(Gls)
1992–1993	Alcoyano	20	(2)
1993–1994	Mensajero	33	(0)
1994–1995	Córdoba	13	(0)
1995–1998	Las Palmas	48	(10)
1998–1999	Numancia	56	(7)
1999–2000	Sevilla	25	(0)
2000–2001	Osasuna	12	(0)
2001–2004	Poli Ejido	89	(4)
2004–2005	Recreativo	25	(1)
2005–2006	Alcoyano	11	(0)
2006–2007	Roquetas	42	(3)
2007–2009	Villa Santa Brígida	64	(6)
Total		445	(43)

Managerial career
- 2010: Villarreal B (assistant)
- 2010–2013: Celta (assistant)
- 2013–2014: Zaragoza (assistant)
- 2014–2015: Las Palmas (assistant)
- 2016–2017: Valladolid (assistant)
- 2020–2021: Langreo
- 2021–2022: Pontevedra
- 2022: Hércules
- 2023–2024: Estepona
- 2025: Melilla
- 2025–2026: Numancia
- * Club domestic league appearances and goals

Ángel Ildefonso Rodríguez Nebreda (born 2 January 1972) is a Spanish retired footballer who played as a midfielder, and is a current manager.

== Playing career ==
Born in León, Castile and León, Rodríguez played Segunda División B well into his 20s, representing CD Alcoyano, CD Mensajero and Córdoba CF. In 1995, he moved to UD Las Palmas, helping in their promotion to Segunda División in his first season.

Rodríguez moved to fellow second division side CD Numancia in January 1998, being a regular starter during the 1998–99 campaign as the club achieved a first-ever promotion to La Liga. He moved to Sevilla FC in the top tier in the 1999 summer, and made his debut in the category on 29 August, coming on as a second-half substitute for Francisco in a 1–2 away loss against RC Celta de Vigo.

Rodríguez left Sevilla after the club's relegation, and subsequently signed for CA Osasuna still in the first division. He featured sparingly during his one-season spell, and then agreed to a deal with second division side Polideportivo Ejido in 2001.

On 26 July 2004, after three years as a starter at Poli, Rodríguez joined Recreativo de Huelva also in the division two. He left in the following year to return to Alcoyano, but moved to Tercera División side CD Roquetas in January 2006.

Rodríguez returned to the third division in 2007, with UD Villa de Santa Brígida. In 2009, after the club's relegation, he retired at the age of 36.

== Managerial career ==
Managed by Paco Herrera at Numancia, Rodríguez became his assistant at Villarreal CF B. He continued to work as Herrera's second at Celta, Real Zaragoza, Las Palmas and Real Valladolid.

On 17 June 2020, Rodríguez was named manager of UP Langreo in the third division. He left the club on 10 June of the following year, after refusing a contract renewal, and took over Pontevedra CF in the new Segunda División RFEF on 11 July 2021.

On 21 June 2022, after achieving promotion to Primera Federación with Pontevedra, Rodríguez was appointed in charge of Hércules CF back in the fourth tier. On 5 December, however, he was sacked.

== Managerial statistics ==
As of match played 19 April 2026

Managerial record by team and tenure
Team	Nat	From	To	Record								Ref
Team	Nat	From	To	G	W	D	L	GF	GA	GD	Win %	Ref
Langreo	(Spain)	17 June 2020	10 June 2021	26	8	9	9	28	32	−4	30.77	
Pontevedra	(Spain)	11 July 2021	21 June 2022	35	18	12	5	66	35	+31	51.43	
Hércules	(Spain)	21 June 2022	5 December 2022	14	3	5	6	14	22	−8	21.43	
Estepona	(Spain)	27 September 2023	8 April 2024	26	11	8	7	30	21	+9	42.31	
Melilla	(Spain)	17 March 2025	16 June 2025	7	3	3	1	13	12	+1	42.86	
Numancia	(Spain)	14 October 2025	Present	28	12	8	8	40	26	+14	42.86	
Career total				136	55	45	36	191	148	+43	40.44	—
