= Applied Neuroscience Society of Australasia =

Australian non-profit professional organization

- President: Tim Hill
- Secretary: Michelle Aniftos
- Treasurer: Terry Eichmann
- Public Officer: Jon Hegg
- Website: www.appliedneuroscience.org.au

The Applied Neuroscience Society of Australasia (ANSA) is a non-profit professional organization for applied neuroscience in Australia, with members in Australia, New Zealand and Asia.

It is established in 2007, following an amalgamation of AAAPB (Australian Association of Applied Psychophysiology and Biofeedback) and Australian Chapter of the ISNR (International Society for Neuronal Regulation).

Members include clinicians and researchers. They comprise psychologists, psychiatrists, pediatricians, behavioral optometrists, speech therapists, trainers and other professionals who have a university degree, appropriate clinical training as well as registration with their professional board.

The aim of the society is to promote expertise and high standards in the optimization of brain functioning through the application of knowledge in brain science, nutrition, psychology and medicine.

Many members are practitioners or researchers of biofeedback and neurofeedback. Their interests include the non-medication treatment of developmental disorders (e.g. ADHD, dyslexia, learning disorders, behavioural problems), psychiatric disorders, as well as performance improvement for the normal individuals.

The Society maintains a close relationship with related international societies, including the Association for Applied Psychophysiology and Biofeedback, International Society for Neurofeedback and Research, and the Biofeedback Foundation of Europe.

It holds an annual Conference, Annual Workshops with invited international speakers, as well as skill training workshops during the year.

== Bibliography ==
- D., Corydon. Lens: The Low Energy Neurofeedback System (Paperback). Hammond.
- John N., Demos. Getting Started with Neurofeedback. Hardcover.
- Stephen, Larsen. The Healing Power of Neurofeedback: The Revolutionary LENS Technique for Restoring Optimal Brain Function. Paperback.
- Mark, Steinberg. ADD: The 20-Hour Solution. Paperback.
- Jim, Robbins. A Symphony in the Brain: The Evolution of the New Brain Wave Biofeedback. Paperback.
- Robert, W. Hill. Getting Rid of Ritalin: How Neurofeedback Can Successfully Treat Attention Deficit Disorder Without Drugs. Paperback.
- Robert W. Hill, Eduardo Castro. Getting Rid of Ritalin: How Neurofeedback Can Successfully Treat Attention Deficit Disorder Without Drugs. Paperback.
- James R. Evans, Andrew Abarbanel. Introduction to Quantitative EEG and Neurofeedback. Hardcover.
- Todd, C. Handy. Event-Related Potentials: A Methods Handbook. Bradford Books.
- Luck, Steven J. An Introduction to the Event-Related Potential Technique (Cognitive Neuroscience). Paperback.
- James, R. Evans. Handbook of Neurofeedback: Dynamics and Clinical Applications. Hardcover.
- Gyorgy, Buzsaki. Rhythms of the Brain. Hardcover.
- James, R. Evans. Introduction to Quantitative EEG and Neurofeedback. Hardcover.
