= Fernando Rodríguez (Argentine footballer) =

Argentine footballer (born 1976)

Personal information
- Full name: Fernando Domingo Rodríguez
- Date of birth: 2 June 1976 (age 50)
- Place of birth: Morón, Buenos Aires, Argentina
- Height: 1.85 m (6 ft 1 in)
- Position: Striker

Senior career*
Years	Team	Apps	(Gls)
1993–1995	Midland		
1995–1997	Platense	14	(1)
1998–1999	Deportivo Morón	29	(8)
1999–2001	Platense	37	(11)
2002	Deportes Concepción	29	(7)
2002	El Porvenir	17	(6)
2003	Cobresal	37	(18)
2004–2005	Olmedo	59	(29)
2006	Al Ahli		
2007	Universidad Católica	35	(13)
2008	Juan Aurich	9	(1)
2008–2009	Sportivo Italiano	20	(5)
2009	Gimnasia y Tiro	12	(1)
2010–2012	Argentino de Merlo	17	(2)
- * Club domestic league appearances and goals

Fernando Domingo Rodríguez (born June 2, 1976) is a former Argentine footballer who played as a striker.

== Teams ==
- (Argentina) Ferrocarril Midland 1993–1997
- (Argentina) Deportivo Morón 1998–1999
- (Argentina) Platense 1999–2001
- (Chile) Deportes Concepción 2002
- (Argentina) El Porvenir 2002
- (Chile) Cobresal 2003
- (Ecuador) Olmedo 2004–2005
- (United Arab Emirates) Al-Ahli 2006
- (Ecuador) Universidad Católica 2007
- (Peru) Juan Aurich 2008
- (Argentina) Sportivo Italiano 2008–2009
- (Argentina) Gimnasia y Tiro de Salta 2009
- (Argentina) Argentino de Merlo 2010–2014
