= Marco Rodríguez =

Marco Rodriguez may refer to:

- Marco Rodríguez (actor) (born 1953), Hispanic-American actor
- Marco Antonio Rodríguez (born 1973), Mexican football referee
- Marco Antonio Rodríguez (racewalker) (born 1994), Bolivian racewalker
- Marco Rodrigues, a video game character from the Fatal Fury series
- Marco Rodríguez (footballer), El Salvadorian football player for A.D. Chalatenango
