= Mauricio Rodriguez Anza =

Mexican architect

Mauricio Rodriguez Anza is an architect and designer born in Mexico City in 1957. His work has focused primarily in the experimental field and has developed a diversity of studies and investigations on architecture and design.

From 1985 to 1997, Rodriguez Anza designed and produced more than 200 pieces of furniture (single pieces or limited-editions series) and an extensive collection of objects, stage design and architectural installations; designed houses, galleries and was introduced to museum design which later became a priority in his work. His interest and intense activity in object and furniture design throughout this period was responsible for the introduction of design into museums and galleries in Mexico for the first time, building a new cultural bridge for the arts. During this period his work became the archetype of Mexican design.

Since 1998, Mauricio Rodriguez Anza lives in the United States and has focused on the development on new ideas on architecture based on progression, versatility and the implementation of new graphic languages; a series of studies and formal exercises originally initiated with “Summons.” Conceived and developed in 1998 by Mauricio Rodriguez Anza, “Summons” is a formal manifesto for the design and performance of horizontal architectural bodies.

His unique approach of the “Transitional Museum” made public in 2009, suggest the creation of new alternative routes in museum design and temporary exhibition spaces.

The work of Mauricio Rodriguez Anza has been widely published and has been the center of individual and group exhibitions in Mexico, United States, Canada, Spain, Italy, Belgium, Switzerland, Hong Kong, and Japan.

Mauricio Rodriguez Anza is the founder of the Anza Falco Museum of Design in Houston, Texas.

== Individual exhibitions ==
- HYPE. Referential Design (2002-2010). 3 Allen Center. Houston. 2010.
- THE TRANSITIONAL MUSEUM. 125 Gallery, Houston Arts Alliance. Houston. 2009.
- TYPOLOGIES. 3 Allen Center. Houston. 2009.
- THRESHOLDS BY MAURICIO RODRIGUEZ ANZA. The Mexican Cultural Institute of New York. New York, 2001.
- SUMMONS. Museo Ex-Teresa. Mexico City. 1998.
- RECONFIGURACIÓN. Museo Carrillo Gil. Mexico City. 1997.
- WORKS BY MAURICIO RODRIGUEZ ANZA. F.A.B. Gallery, University of Alberta, Edmonton. Canada. 1994.
- CUATRO OBJETOS. Museo Carrillo Gil. Mexico City. 1992.
- VÍA ALTERNA. Museo del Chopo. Mexico City. 1992.
- NUEVO DISEÑO, TRABAJO RECIENTE. Galería Mexicana de Diseño. Mexico City. 1991.
- ESPACIO DIMENSIONAL. Artes de México. Mexico City. 1989.
- PROPUESTA PARA UN DISEÑO. Galería Hardy's. Mexico City. 1988.
