= Pablo Rodríguez (footballer, born 1979) =

Uruguayan footballer

Personal information
- Full name: Pablo Sebastián Rodríguez Carbajal
- Date of birth: 23 August 1979 (age 47)
- Place of birth: Montevideo, Uruguay
- Height: 1.87 m (6 ft 2 in)
- Position: Defender

Senior career*
Years	Team	Apps	(Gls)
1999–2001	Nacional		
2002–2009	Tacuarembó	11	(1)
2010	San Martín de San Juan		
2011	Miramar Misiones	2	(0)
2011–2012	Deportivo Mictlán	12	(0)
2012–2015	USAC	42	(1)
- * Club domestic league appearances and goals

Pablo Sebastián Rodríguez Carbajal, known as Pablo Rodríguez (born 23 August 1979) is an Uruguayan former professional footballer who played as a defender in Uruguay for Nacional, Tacuarembó F.C., Boston River, Miramar Misiones, in Argentina for San Martín de San Juan and in Guatemala for Deportivo Mictlán and Universidad SC.
