= Felipe Rodríguez (composer) =

Spanish organist and composer

Felipe Rodríguez (1759/60 – 1814/15) was a Spanish classical era composer.

Rodríguez was born in Madrid, possibly on 1 May 1760. At age ten, he went to the Escolania de Montserrat near Barcelona, which has existed as a musical institution since the 14th century. He became a priest in 1783 and shortly afterwards returned to Madrid, where he became an organist. His extant compositions mainly include organ and keyboard sonatas.
