= Isidro Rodríguez (footballer) =

Spanish footballer

Personal information
- Full name: Isidro Rodríguez Gómez
- Date of birth: 1890s
- Place of birth: Pontevedra, Galicia, Spain
- Date of death: Unknown
- Position: Goalkeeper

Senior career*
Years	Team	Apps	(Gls)
1919–1923	Real Vigo Sporting		
1923–1925	Celta de Vigo		
1925–1931	Deportivo de La Coruña	47	(0)
1931–1932	Atlético Madrid	8	(0)
1934–1935	Deportivo de La Coruña	8	(0)

International career
1922–1923	Galicia		
Medal record
Galicia
Prince of Asturias Cup
Silver medal – second place	1922-23 Prince of Asturias Cup	Team
- * Club domestic league appearances and goals

Isidro Rodríguez Gómez, sometimes known as just Isidro, was a Spanish footballer who played as a goalkeeper.

Isidro was one of the first Celta de Vigo goalkeepers and he was part of the first-ever team fielded by Celta de Vigo in 1923.

== Club career ==
Born in Pontevedra, Galicia, he began playing football at his hometown club Real Vigo Sporting in 1919, helping Sporting to win two Galician Championships in 1919-20 and 1922-23. He remained there until Sporting was merged with Fortuna de Vigo in 1923, to form Celta de Vigo. The Celta presentation match was held on 14 September 1923 between an A and a B team formed with the players from the club, taking advantage of the large team available that this new club had. Isidro was part of the first-ever team fielded by Celta de Vigo by being the goalkeeper of the A-team. Isidro was the starting goalkeeper at Celta's first official game on 23 September 1923 against Boavista, in which he was part of an 8-2 victory. In Celta's first year, the team became the Galician champion after winning the 1923-24 championship with Isidro and Lilo as goalkeepers. On 24 March 1924, Isidro was Celta's goalkeeper in the team's debut at the Copa del Rey against Athletic Bilbao.

At the beginning of the following season (1924/25) he requested to leave the club and moved his address to A Coruña, although he could not sign for another team during that season as Celta did not authorize him. At the beginning of the following season (1925/26) he tried to sign for Deportivo La Coruña, but Celta opposed that and Galician Football Federation denied the signing. However, Royal Spanish Football Federation agreed in December 1925 that Isidro's record was transferred to Deportivo.

== International career ==
Being a player of Real Vigo Sporting, he was summoned to play for the Galicia national team, and he was one of the eleven footballers that played in the team's first-ever game on 19 November 1922, a 4-1 win over a Castile/Madrid XI in the quarter-finals of the 1922–23 Prince of Asturias Cup, an inter-regional competition organized by the RFEF. Isidro helped the team reach the final, which they lost 1–3 to Asturias, courtesy of a second-half brace from José Luis Zabala.

== Honours ==
=== Club ===
Real Vigo Sporting

Galician Championship:

- Winners (2) 1919–20, 1922–23

Celta de Vigo

Galician Championship:

- Winners (1) 1923–24

Deportivo de La Coruña

Galician Championship:

- Winners (2) 1926–27, 1927–28

=== International ===
Asturias

Prince of Asturias Cup:

- Runner-up (1): 1922–23
