= Antonio Rodríguez San Juan =

Venezuelan politician

Antonio Rodriguez San Juan

2nd Governor of Vargas
- In office 2000–2008
- Preceded by: Alfredo Laya
- Succeeded by: Jorge García Carneiro

Personal details
- Born: April 12, 1957 (age 68) Maracaibo, Zulia State
- Political party: United Socialist Party of Venezuela (PSUV)
- Spouse: Yolanda Galvan de Rodriguez
- Profession: politician

Vargas State Governor Election, 2004 Results
Source: CNE data

Candidates	Votes	%
Antonio Rodriguez	38920	55%
Roberto Smith	13598	19%

Antonio Rodriguez San Juan (born April 12, 1957) is a Venezuela Politician. He was the governor of Vargas State from 2000 to 2008. He is a member of the United Socialist Party of Venezuela (PSUV) of Venezuela's president, Hugo Chávez.
