= Luis Rodríguez Zúñiga =

Spanish sociologist (1942–1991)

Luis Rodríguez Zúñiga (Barcelona, 1942 — May 1991, Madrid) was a Spanish sociologist, who from 1988 until his death was president of the Centro de Investigaciones Sociológicas.

== Career ==
Obtaining his bachelor's degree at ICADE, Rodríguez graduated from the 1970 class of the Complutense University of Madrid with his Doctor of Law, his thesis being on the French academic Raymond Aron. From 1969 to 1971, he studied sociology at the University of Pau and the Adour Region, collaborating with Spanish exiles like Manuel Tuñón de Lara. As such, Rodríguez was anti-Francoist, advocating for democracy during the early 1970s. Consequently, in addition to his studies on Alexis de Tocqueville, he was described by Carlos Moya as a "Tocquevillian socialist sociologist".

From 1972, he taught social philosophy at the Faculty of Law at the Complutense University of Madrid. In 1982, he became an associate professor in the Faculty of Political Science and Sociology, obtaining the chair of sociological theory the following year. During this time he was also director of the Centro Español de Estudios de América Latina (CEDEAL).

From 1988, he was president of the Centro de Investigaciones Sociológicas, directing the journal Reis. On 4 May 1991, he died in Madrid from lung cancer.

== Works ==
Sources:

- Raymond Aron y la sociedad industrial, Madrid, CIS, 1973.
- Elites y democracia, Valencia, Ed. Fernando Torres, 1976.
- Para una lectura crítica de Durkheim, Madrid, Akal, 1978.
- With C. Iglesias y J. Aramberri, Los orígenes de la teoría sociológica, Madrid, Akal, 1980.
- "Marx y la teoría sociológica clásica". Cuadernos Hispanoamericanos (401): 119–136. November 1983.
- Tocqueville. Recuerdos de la Revolución de 1848, Madrid, Editora Nacional, 1984.
- With Fermín Bouza Álvarez (comps.), Sociología contemporánea. Ocho temas a debate, Madrid, CIS, 1984.

== Sources ==
=== Bibliography ===
- Moya, Carlos (1991). "Luis Rodriguez-Zuñiga: In Memoriam". Reis (54): 13–17. ISSN 0210-5233. JSTOR 40183516.
