= Freddy Rodríguez (baseball) =

Cuban baseball player (1924–2009)

- Pitcher
- Born: April 29, 1924; Havana, Cuba
- Died: June 11, 2009 (aged 85); Miami, Florida, U.S.
- Batted: Right Threw: Right

MLB debut
- April 18, 1958, for the Chicago Cubs

Last MLB appearance
- May 27, 1959, for the Philadelphia Phillies

MLB statistics
- Win–loss record: 0–0
- Earned run average: 8.68
- Strikeouts: 6
- Stats at Baseball Reference

Teams
- Chicago Cubs (1958); Philadelphia Phillies (1959)

Fernando Pedro "Freddy" Rodríguez Borrego (April 29, 1924 – June 11, 2009) was a Cuban-born professional baseball pitcher who briefly played for the Chicago Cubs (1958) and Philadelphia Phillies (1959) of Major League Baseball. A native of Havana, he was listed as 6 feet (1.83 m) tall and 180 pounds (82 kg); he batted and threw right-handed.

Rodríguez' professional career extended for 18 seasons, 1945 through 1962, but he would appear in only eight major league games during those brief, late-1950s trials, when he was already in his mid-30s. Apart from the wartime 1945 campaign, his first 11 seasons in Organized Baseball all were spent in the lowest levels of the minor leagues of the day: Classes B, C and D. Finally, in 1956, he rose to the Double-A and Triple-A levels.

In 1958, he was acquired by the Cubs and appeared in seven early-season games as a relief pitcher. He was credited with a save in his April 18 debut, hurling 11/3 innings of one-hit, scoreless ball against the St. Louis Cardinals at Wrigley Field. He earned a second save nine days later when he preserved a 5–4 Cubs' triumph against the San Francisco Giants at Seals Stadium. At that point, Rodríguez' earned run average was a respectable 3.18, but he was hit hard in his next three outings, and by the time he was demoted to the minors after May 18, his ERA was a poor 7.36 in 71/3 innings pitched. Obtained by the Phillies during the 1958–1959 offseason, he received only a one-game audition in June, when he allowed three earned runs in two innings pitched in middle relief against the Cincinnati Reds at Crosley Field on May 27. He then returned to the minor leagues for the next 31/2 seasons.

In his eight MLB games, Rodríguez allowed 12 hits (including three home runs) and five bases on balls in his career 91/3 innings pitched, with six strikeouts. Along with his two career saves, he compiled an ERA of 8.68. Fernando "Freddy" Rodríguez died in Miami, Florida, on June 11, 2009.
