= 1997–98 Torneo Argentino A =

III Torneo Argentino A
- Season: 1997–98
- Champions: Gimnasia y Esgrima (CdU) (1st divisional title); Juventud Antoniana (2nd divisional title)
- Promoted: Gimnasia y Esgrima (CdU); Juventud Antoniana
- Relegated: Concepción FC; Deportivo Patagones

The 1997–98 Argentine Torneo Argentino A was the third season of third division professional football in Argentina. A total of 16 teams competed; the champions were promoted to Primera B Nacional.

== Club information ==
=== Zone A ===
Club	City	Stadium
Ben Hur	Rafaela	Parque Barrio Ilolay
Cultural Argentino	General Pico	El Volcán
Deportivo Patagones	Carmen de Patagones	Tricolor
Ferrocarril	Concordia	Profesor Mariano Amable
General Belgrano	Santa Rosa	Nuevo Rancho Grande
Gimnasia y Esgrima	Concepción del Uruguay	Manuel y Ramón Núñez
Patronato	Paraná	Presbítero Bartolomé Grella
Villa Mitre	Bahía Blanca	El Fortín

=== Zone B ===
Club	City	Stadium
Concepción	Concepción	Stewart Shipton
Estudiantes	Río Cuarto	Ciudad de Río Cuarto
General Paz Juniors	Córdoba	General Paz Juniors
Huracán	San Rafael	Pretel Hermanos
Independiente Rivadavia	Mendoza	Bautista Gargantini
Juventud Alianza	Santa Lucía	Bosque del Bajo Grande
Juventud Antoniana	Salta	Fray Honorato Pistoia
San Martín	Monte Comán	Ovidio Bernues

=== Teams from Argentino B that played the Final Stage ===
Club	City	Stadium
Central Córdoba	Santiago del Estero	Alfredo Terrara
Deportivo Barraca	Paso de los Libres	Agustín Faraldo
Liniers	Bahía Blanca	Alejandro Pérez
Ñuñorco	Monteros	Ñuñorco

== First stage ==
=== Zone A ===
Pos	Team	Pld	W	D	L	GF	GA	GD	Pts	Qualification
1	Villa Mitre	16	10	2	4	37	20	+17	32	Final Stage
2	Patronato	16	9	4	3	22	12	+10	31	Final Stage
3	Gimnasia y Esgrima (CdU)	16	9	4	3	28	15	+13	31	Final Stage
4	Ben Hur	16	6	7	3	26	17	+9	25	
5	General Belgrano	16	4	6	6	23	28	−5	18	
6	Ferrocarril (C)	16	2	10	4	15	20	−5	16	
7	Cultural Argentino	16	2	6	8	13	22	−9	12	
8	Deportivo Patagones	16	0	3	13	9	43	−34	3	Relegation Playoffs

=== Zone B ===
Pos	Team	Pld	W	D	L	GF	GA	GD	Pts	Qualification
1	Juventud Antoniana	16	10	3	3	29	12	+17	33	Final Stage
2	Huracán (SR)	16	8	4	4	25	18	+7	28	Final Stage
3	Juventud Alianza	16	7	5	4	24	20	+4	26	Final Stage
4	Independiente Rivadavia	16	7	4	5	21	14	+7	25	
5	San Martín (MC)	16	6	4	6	29	29	0	22	
6	Estudiantes (RC)	16	5	3	8	18	21	−3	18	
7	General Paz Juniors	16	4	2	10	15	30	−15	14	
8	Concepción (FC)	16	3	5	8	16	31	−15	14	Relegation Playoffs

== Final stage ==
=== Zone A ===
Pos	Team	Pld	W	D	L	GF	GA	GD	Pts	Promotion or qualification
1	Gimnasia y Esgrima (CdU)	8	4	3	1	10	5	+5	15	Primera B Nacional
2	Villa Mitre	8	4	2	2	13	11	+2	14	Promotion/relegation playoff
3	Patronato	8	2	6	0	8	3	+5	12	
4	Liniers (BB)	8	1	3	4	6	8	−2	6	Relegation Playoffs
5	Deportivo Barraca (PdlL)	8	1	2	5	6	16	−10	5	

=== Zone B ===
Pos	Team	Pld	W	D	L	GF	GA	GD	Pts	Promotion or qualification
1	Juventud Antoniana	8	5	2	1	15	5	+10	17	Primera B Nacional
2	Huracán (SR)	8	4	1	3	12	12	0	13	Promotion/relegation playoff
3	Juventud Alianza	8	3	2	3	12	12	0	11	
4	Central Córdoba (SdE)	8	3	1	4	12	12	0	10	
5	Ñuñorco	8	2	0	6	9	18	−9	6	Relegation Playoffs

== Relegation Playoffs ==
=== Semifinals ===
Team 1	Score	Team 2
Concepción (FC)	2–2 (3–2 p)	Liniers (BB)

- Liniers (BB) remains in Torneo Argentino B.

Team 1	Score	Team 2
Deportivo Patagones	–	Ñuñorco

- Deportivo Patagones abandoned the competition and was relegated to 1998–99 Torneo Argentino B. The match was awarded 1-0 to Ñuñorco.

=== Final ===
Team 1	Score	Team 2
Concepción (FC)	1–2	Ñuñorco

- Ñuñorco was promoted to 1998–99 Torneo Argentino A by winning the playoff and Concepción FC was relegated to 1998–99 Torneo Argentino B.

== See also ==
- 1997–98 in Argentine football
