= 2000–01 Torneo Argentino A =

VI Torneo Argentino A
- Season: 2000–01
- Champions: Huracán (TA) (1st divisional title)
- Promoted: Huracán (TA)
- Relegated: Deportivo Barraca (PdlL); General Belgrano; Liniers (BB)

The 2000–01 Argentine Torneo Argentino A was the sixth season of third division professional football in Argentina. A total of 18 teams competed; the champion was promoted to Primera B Nacional.

== Club information ==
=== Zone A ===
Club	City	Stadium
Aldosivi	Mar del Plata	José María Minella
CAI	Comodoro Rivadavia	Estadio Municipal
Cultural Argentino	General Pico	El Volcán
General Belgrano	Santa Rosa	Nuevo Rancho Grande
Huracán	San Rafael	Pretel Hermanos
Huracán	Tres Arroyos	Roberto Lorenzo Bottino
Juventud Alianza	Santa Lucía	Bosque del Bajo Grande
Liniers	Bahía Blanca	Alejandro Pérez
Luján de Cuyo	Luján de Cuyo	Jardín del Bajo

=== Zone B ===
Club	City	Stadium
13 de Junio	Pirané	Pirané
Ben Hur	Rafaela	Parque Barrio Ilolay
Deportivo Barraca	Paso de los Libres	Agustín Faraldo
Douglas Haig	Pergamino	Miguel Morales
Gimnasia y Tiro	Salta	Gigante del Norte
Huracán Corrientes	Corrientes	José Antonio Romero Feris
Ñuñorco	Monteros	Ñuñorco
Patronato	Paraná	Presbítero Bartolomé Grella
Tiro Federal	Rosario	Fortín de Ludueña

== First stage ==
=== Zone A ===
Pos	Team	Pld	W	D	L	GF	GA	GD	Pts	Qualification or relegation
1	Huracán (TA)	16	9	7	0	27	15	+12	34	Final Stage
2	Juventud Alianza	16	8	5	3	28	21	+7	29	Final Stage
3	Cultural Argentino	16	7	5	4	22	16	+6	26	Final Stage
4	Luján de Cuyo	16	6	5	5	20	17	+3	23	
5	CAI	16	6	4	6	22	21	+1	22	
6	Huracán (SR)	16	4	5	7	16	19	−3	17	
7	Aldosivi	16	4	4	8	19	24	−5	16	
8	General Belgrano	16	4	3	9	19	25	−6	15	Relegation Playoff
9	Liniers (BB)	16	3	4	9	18	30	−12	13	Torneo Argentino B

=== Zone B ===
Pos	Team	Pld	W	D	L	GF	GA	GD	Pts	Qualification or relegation
1	Ben Hur	16	7	6	3	29	21	+8	27	Final Stage
2	Gimnasia y Tiro	16	7	5	4	25	24	+1	26	Final Stage
3	Patronato	16	6	7	3	22	16	+6	25	Final Stage
4	Ñuñorco	16	6	5	5	28	25	+3	23	
5	Douglas Haig	16	7	2	7	22	25	−3	23	
6	Tiro Federal	16	5	6	5	23	16	+7	21	
7	13 de Junio (P)	16	3	8	5	26	29	−3	17	
8	Huracán Corrientes	16	3	7	6	16	23	−7	16	Relegation Playoff
9	Deportivo Barraca (PdlL)	16	4	2	10	25	37	−12	14	Torneo Argentino B

== Final stage ==
Pos	Team	Pld	W	D	L	GF	GA	GD	Pts	Promotion
1	Huracán (TA)	10	6	2	2	17	11	+6	20	Primera B Nacional
2	Gimnasia y Tiro	10	6	0	4	24	22	+2	18	
3	Juventud Alianza	10	5	2	3	16	9	+7	17	
4	Ben Hur	10	4	3	3	15	11	+4	15	
5	Patronato	10	4	2	4	16	18	−2	14	
6	Cultural Argentino	10	0	1	9	7	24	−17	1	

== Relegation playoff ==
Team 1	Agg.	Team 2	1st leg	2nd leg
Relegation/promotion playoff 1
Talleres (P)	3–3 (4–5 p)	Huracán Corrientes	1–3	2–0
Relegation/promotion playoff 2
Estudiantes (RC)	3–2	General Belgrano	0–1	3–1

- Huracán Corrientes remained in the Torneo Argentino A by winning the playoff.
- Estudiantes (RC) was promoted to 2001–02 Torneo Argentino A by winning the playoff and General Belgrano was relegated to 2001–02 Torneo Argentino B.

== See also ==
- 2000–01 in Argentine football
