= 1996–97 Torneo Argentino A =

II Torneo Argentino A
- Season: 1996–97
- Champions: Almirante Brown (A) (1st divisional title); San Martín (M) (1st divisional title)
- Promoted: Almirante Brown (A); San Martín (M)
- Relegated: Alvarado; CAI; Central Norte; Desamparados; Germinal; Grupo Universitario; San Martín (F); Unión Santiago

The 1996–97 Argentine Torneo Argentino A was the second season of third division professional football in Argentina. A total of 22 teams competed; the champion was promoted to Primera B Nacional.

== Club information ==
=== Zone A ===
| Club | City | Stadium |
|---|---|---|
| Almirante Brown | Arrecifes | Estadio Municipal |
| Alvarado | Mar del Plata^{1} | (None) ^{1} |
| Ferrocarril | Concordia | Professor Mariano Amable |
| Grupo Universitario | Tandil | Municipal General San Martín |
| Patronato | Paraná | Presbítero Bartolomé Grella |
| San Martín | Formosa | 17 de Octubre |

Play their home games at Estadio José María Minella.

=== Zone B ===
| Club | City | Stadium |
|---|---|---|
| Desamparados | San Juan | El Serpentario |
| Huracán | San Rafael | Pretel Hermanos |
| Independiente Rivadavia | Mendoza | Bautista Gargantini |
| Juventud Alianza | Santa Lucía | Bosque del Bajo Grande |
| San Martín | Mendoza | San Martín |

=== Zone C ===
| Club | City | Stadium |
|---|---|---|
| CAI | Comodoro Rivadavia | Estadio Municipal |
| Cultural Argentino | General Pico | El Volcán |
| Deportivo Patagones | Carmen de Patagones | Tricolor |
| General Belgrano | Santa Rosa | Nuevo Rancho Grande |
| Germinal | Rawson | El Fortín |
| Villa Mitre | Bahía Blanca | El Fortín |

=== Zone D ===
| Club | City | Stadium |
|---|---|---|
| Central Norte | Salta | Dr. Luis Güemes |
| Concepción | Concepción | Stewart Shipton |
| Estudiantes | Río Cuarto | Ciudad de Río Cuarto |
| General Paz Juniors | Córdoba | General Paz Juniors |
| Unión Santiago | Santiago del Estero | Roberto Molinari |

=== Teams from Argentino B that played the Final Stage ===
| Club | City | Stadium |
|---|---|---|
| Ben Hur | Rafaela | Parque Barrio Ilolay |
| Ex Alumnos Escuela N°185 | Oberá | Juan Areco |
| San Martín | Monte Comán | Ovidio Bernues |
| Unión | Villa Krause | 12 de Octubre |

== First stage ==
=== Zone A ===
| Pos | Team | Pld | W | D | L | GF | GA | GD | Pts | Qualification |
|---|---|---|---|---|---|---|---|---|---|---|
| 1 | Almirante Brown (A) | 10 | 8 | 2 | 0 | 23 | 3 | +20 | 26 | Second Stage |
| 2 | Patronato | 10 | 4 | 3 | 3 | 10 | 9 | +1 | 15 | Second Stage |
| 3 | Ferrocarril (C) | 10 | 4 | 2 | 4 | 18 | 18 | 0 | 14 | Second Stage |
| 4 | Grupo Universitario | 10 | 4 | 1 | 5 | 16 | 11 | +5 | 13 | Second Stage |
| 5 | San Martín (F) | 10 | 3 | 2 | 5 | 15 | 29 | −14 | 11 | Relegation Playoffs |
| 6 | Alvarado | 10 | 1 | 2 | 7 | 6 | 18 | −12 | 5 | Relegation Playoffs |

=== Zone B ===
| Pos | Team | Pld | W | D | L | GF | GA | GD | Pts | Qualification |
|---|---|---|---|---|---|---|---|---|---|---|
| 1 | Huracán (SR) | 8 | 5 | 1 | 2 | 13 | 10 | +3 | 16 | Second Stage |
| 2 | Juventud Alianza | 8 | 3 | 4 | 1 | 6 | 3 | +3 | 13 | Second Stage |
| 3 | San Martín (M) | 8 | 3 | 3 | 2 | 8 | 9 | −1 | 12 | Second Stage |
| 4 | Independiente Rivadavia | 8 | 3 | 2 | 3 | 10 | 6 | +4 | 11 | Second Stage |
| 5 | Desamparados | 8 | 0 | 2 | 6 | 8 | 17 | −9 | 2 | Relegation Playoffs |

=== Zone C ===
| Pos | Team | Pld | W | D | L | GF | GA | GD | Pts | Qualification |
|---|---|---|---|---|---|---|---|---|---|---|
| 1 | Deportivo Patagones | 10 | 6 | 1 | 3 | 17 | 18 | −1 | 19 | Second Stage |
| 2 | General Belgrano | 10 | 6 | 0 | 4 | 18 | 13 | +5 | 18 | Second Stage |
| 3 | Cultural Argentino | 10 | 6 | 0 | 4 | 9 | 8 | +1 | 18 | Second Stage |
| 4 | Villa Mitre | 10 | 5 | 2 | 3 | 23 | 14 | +9 | 17 | Second Stage |
| 5 | Germinal | 10 | 3 | 2 | 5 | 8 | 12 | −4 | 11 | Relegation Playoffs |
| 6 | CAI | 10 | 1 | 1 | 8 | 8 | 18 | −10 | 4 | Relegation Playoffs |

=== Zone D ===
| Pos | Team | Pld | W | D | L | GF | GA | GD | Pts | Qualification |
|---|---|---|---|---|---|---|---|---|---|---|
| 1 | Estudiantes (RC) | 8 | 3 | 3 | 2 | 14 | 7 | +7 | 12 | Second Stage |
| 2 | Concepción FC | 8 | 3 | 3 | 2 | 16 | 12 | +4 | 12 | Second Stage |
| 3 | Central Norte | 8 | 3 | 2 | 3 | 12 | 18 | −6 | 11 | Second Stage |
| 4 | General Paz Juniors | 8 | 3 | 1 | 4 | 15 | 16 | −1 | 10 | Second Stage |
| 5 | Unión Santiago | 8 | 3 | 1 | 4 | 12 | 16 | −4 | 10 | Relegation Playoffs |

== Second stage ==
=== Championship Stage ===
==== Zone A ====
| Pos | Team | Pld | W | D | L | GF | GA | GD | Pts | Qualification or relegation |
|---|---|---|---|---|---|---|---|---|---|---|
| 1 | Villa Mitre | 14 | 9 | 4 | 1 | 27 | 17 | +10 | 31 | Third Stage |
| 2 | Almirante Brown (A) | 14 | 8 | 3 | 3 | 22 | 8 | +14 | 27 | Third Stage |
| 3 | Cultural Argentino | 14 | 6 | 3 | 5 | 23 | 19 | +4 | 21 | |
| 4 | Ferrocarril (C) | 14 | 5 | 5 | 4 | 28 | 24 | +4 | 20 | |
| 5 | Patronato | 14 | 4 | 5 | 5 | 15 | 16 | −1 | 17 | |
| 6 | Deportivo Patagones | 14 | 4 | 4 | 6 | 17 | 24 | −7 | 16 | |
| 7 | General Belgrano | 14 | 4 | 2 | 8 | 15 | 27 | −12 | 14 | |
| 8 | Grupo Universitario | 14 | 1 | 4 | 9 | 14 | 26 | −12 | 7 | Torneo Argentino B |

==== Zone B ====
| Pos | Team | Pld | W | D | L | GF | GA | GD | Pts | Qualification or relegation |
|---|---|---|---|---|---|---|---|---|---|---|
| 1 | Huracán (SR) | 14 | 9 | 0 | 5 | 17 | 15 | +2 | 27 | Third Stage |
| 2 | San Martín (M) | 14 | 7 | 5 | 2 | 16 | 8 | +8 | 26 | Third Stage |
| 3 | Independiente Rivadavia | 14 | 7 | 2 | 5 | 20 | 16 | +4 | 23 | Third Stage |
| 4 | Concepción FC | 14 | 5 | 2 | 7 | 22 | 20 | +2 | 17 | |
| 5 | Estudiantes (RC) | 14 | 4 | 5 | 5 | 23 | 24 | −1 | 17 | |
| 6 | General Paz Juniors | 14 | 4 | 4 | 6 | 19 | 24 | −5 | 16 | |
| 7 | Juventud Alianza | 14 | 4 | 3 | 7 | 21 | 23 | −2 | 15 | |
| 8 | Central Norte | 14 | 2 | 7 | 5 | 10 | 18 | −8 | 13 | Torneo Argentino B |

=== Relegation Playoffs ===
==== First stage ====
| Team 1 | Agg. | Team 2 | 1st leg | 2nd leg |
Relegation/promotion playoff 1
| Germinal | 2–1 | CAI | 1–1 | 1–0 |
Relegation/promotion playoff 2
| Alvarado | 3–2 | Desamparados | 2–1 | 1–1 |
Relegation/promotion playoff 3
| Unión Santiago | – | San Martín (F) | – | – |

- CAI is relegated to 1997–98 Torneo Argentino B and Germinal advances to Second Stage by winning the playoff.
- Desamparados is relegated to 1997–98 Torneo Argentino B and Alvarado advances to Second Stage by winning the playoff.
- San Martín (F) withdrew and is relegated to 1997–98 Torneo Argentino B and Unión Santiago advances to Second Stage by winning the playoff.

==== Second stage ====
| Pos | Team | Pld | W | D | L | GF | GA | GD | Pts | Qualification or relegation |
|---|---|---|---|---|---|---|---|---|---|---|
| 1 | Germinal | 4 | 2 | 1 | 1 | 4 | 6 | −2 | 7 | Third Stage |
| 2 | Unión Santiago | 4 | 1 | 1 | 2 | 6 | 1 | +5 | 1 (Note: 3 points deducted) | Torneo Argentino B |
| 3 | Alvarado | 4 | 0 | 2 | 2 | 4 | 7 | −3 | 2 | Torneo Argentino B |

== Third stage ==
=== Championship Stage ===
==== Zone A ====
| Pos | Team | Pld | W | D | L | GF | GA | GD | Pts | Promotion or relegation |
|---|---|---|---|---|---|---|---|---|---|---|
| 1 | Almirante Brown (A) | 8 | 7 | 1 | 0 | 21 | 4 | +17 | 22 | Primera B Nacional |
| 2 | Villa Mitre | 8 | 6 | 0 | 2 | 16 | 8 | +8 | 18 | |
| 3 | Ben Hur | 8 | 4 | 0 | 4 | 12 | 8 | +4 | 12 | |
| 4 | Germinal | 8 | 1 | 1 | 6 | 8 | 17 | −9 | 4 | Torneo Argentino B |
| 5 | Ex Alumnos Escuela N°185 | 8 | 1 | 0 | 7 | 6 | 26 | −20 | 3 | |

==== Zone B ====
| Pos | Team | Pld | W | D | L | GF | GA | GD | Pts | Promotion |
|---|---|---|---|---|---|---|---|---|---|---|
| 1 | San Martín (M) | 8 | 5 | 2 | 1 | 13 | 7 | +6 | 17 | Primera B Nacional |
| 2 | Independiente Rivadavia | 8 | 5 | 1 | 2 | 16 | 7 | +9 | 16 | |
| 3 | Unión (VK) | 8 | 2 | 3 | 3 | 6 | 11 | −5 | 9 | |
| 4 | Huracán (SR) | 8 | 2 | 1 | 5 | 7 | 9 | −2 | 7 | |
| 5 | San Martín (MC) | 8 | 2 | 1 | 5 | 6 | 14 | −8 | 7 | |

== See also ==
- 1996–97 in Argentine football
