= 2002–03 Torneo Argentino A =

VIII Torneo Argentino A
- Season: 2002–03
- Champions: Tiro Federal (1st divisional title)
- Promoted: Tiro Federal
- Relegated: 9 de Julio (R); Estudiantes (RC); Juventud Alianza; Independiente (VO)

The 2002–03 Argentine Torneo Argentino A was the eighth season of third division professional football in Argentina. A total of 20 teams competed; the champion was promoted to Primera B Nacional.

== Club information ==
=== Zone A ===
Club	City	Stadium
Aldosivi	Mar del Plata	José María Minella
Cipolletti	Cipolletti	La Visera de Cemento
Douglas Haig	Pergamino	Miguel Morales
Estudiantes	Río Cuarto	Ciudad de Río Cuarto
Villa Mitre	Bahía Blanca	El Fortín

=== Zone B ===
Club	City	Stadium
Independiente	Villa Obrera	La Boutique
Independiente Rivadavia	Mendoza	Bautista Gargantini
Juventud Alianza	Santa Lucía	Bosque del Bajo Grande
Juventud Unida Universitario	San Luis	Mario Diez
Luján de Cuyo	Luján de Cuyo	Jardín del Bajo

=== Zone C ===
Club	City	Stadium
9 de Julio	Rafaela	El Coloso
Ben Hur	Rafaela	Parque Barrio Ilolay
General Paz Juniors	Córdoba	General Paz Juniors
Racing	Córdoba	Miguel Sancho
Tiro Federal	Rosario	Fortín de Ludueña

=== Zone D ===
Club	City	Stadium
13 de Junio	Pirané	Pirané
Atlético Tucumán	Tucumán	Monumental José Fierro
Gimnasia y Tiro	Salta	Gigante del Norte
Ñuñorco	Monteros	Ñuñorco
Talleres	Perico	Plinio Zabala

== Apertura 2002 ==
=== First stage ===
In every round the bye team played against the bye team of the other zone: Team from Zone A vs Team from Zone B and Team from Zone C vs Team from Zone D.

==== Zone A ====
Pos	Team	Pld	W	D	L	GF	GA	GD	Pts	Qualification
1	Cipolletti	10	5	3	2	17	11	+6	18	Final Stage
2	Douglas Haig	10	5	3	2	12	9	+3	18	Final Stage
3	Aldosivi	10	3	4	3	15	15	0	13	
4	Villa Mitre	10	3	4	3	15	17	−2	13	
5	Estudiantes (RC)	10	1	4	5	10	14	−4	7	

==== Zone B ====
Pos	Team	Pld	W	D	L	GF	GA	GD	Pts	Qualification
1	Juventud Unida Universitario	10	8	0	2	16	11	+5	24	Final Stage
2	Independiente Rivadavia	10	4	2	4	16	13	+3	14	Final Stage
3	Luján de Cuyo	10	4	2	4	16	11	+5	14	
4	Independiente (VO)	10	2	3	5	12	16	−4	9	
5	Juventud Alianza	10	2	1	7	12	24	−12	7	

==== Zone C ====
Pos	Team	Pld	W	D	L	GF	GA	GD	Pts	Qualification
1	Tiro Federal	10	3	6	1	16	10	+6	15	Final Stage
2	Racing (C)	10	3	5	2	8	7	+1	14	Final Stage
3	Ben Hur	10	3	5	2	17	11	+6	14	
4	General Paz Juniors	10	2	5	3	9	13	−4	11	
5	9 de Julio (R)	10	2	4	4	10	15	−5	10	

==== Zone D ====
Pos	Team	Pld	W	D	L	GF	GA	GD	Pts	Qualification
1	Ñuñorco	10	6	3	1	17	10	+7	21	Final Stage
2	Atlético Tucumán	10	4	3	3	20	10	+10	15	Final Stage
3	13 de Junio (P)	10	4	2	4	11	19	−8	14	
4	Gimnasia y Tiro	10	2	3	5	11	14	−3	9	
5	Talleres (P)	10	1	4	5	7	17	−10	7	

=== Final stage ===
Quarterfinals
C1	Tiro Federal	1	2	3
D2	Atlético Tucumán	1	1	2
D1	Ñuñorco	1	0	1
C2	Racing (C)	1	1	2
B1	Juv. Unida Universitario	0	2	2
A2	Douglas Haig	3	0	3
A1	Cipolletti	0	1	1
B2	Independiente Rivadavia	4	4	8

Semifinals
C1	Tiro Federal	0	1	1
C2	Racing (C)	0	3	3
A2	Douglas Haig	3	2	5
B2	Independiente Rivadavia	2	1	3

Final
A2	Douglas Haig	0	1	1 (2)
C2	Racing (C) (p)	1	0	1 (3)

- Note: The team in the first line plays at home the second leg.

== Clausura 2003 ==
=== First stage ===
In every round the bye team played against the bye team of the other zone: Team from Zone A vs Team from Zone B and Team from Zone C vs Team from Zone D.

==== Zone A ====
Pos	Team	Pld	W	D	L	GF	GA	GD	Pts	Qualification
1	Aldosivi	10	6	3	1	21	10	+11	21	Final Stage
2	Cipolletti	10	5	2	3	27	19	+8	17	Final Stage
3	Douglas Haig	10	4	3	3	16	17	−1	15	
4	Villa Mitre	10	3	2	5	12	19	−7	11	
5	Estudiantes (RC)	10	3	1	6	10	19	−9	10	

==== Zone B ====
Pos	Team	Pld	W	D	L	GF	GA	GD	Pts	Qualification
1	Luján de Cuyo	10	6	2	2	17	7	+10	20	Final Stage
2	Juventud Alianza (Note: Juventud Alianza was ineligible for the Final Stage, as it was involved in relegation.)	10	4	2	4	19	13	+6	14	
3	Independiente Rivadavia	10	3	4	3	19	23	−4	13	Final Stage
4	Independiente (VO)	10	2	5	3	9	14	−5	11	
5	Juventud Unida Universitario	10	0	4	6	9	17	−8	4	

==== Zone C ====
Pos	Team	Pld	W	D	L	GF	GA	GD	Pts	Qualification
1	Tiro Federal	10	6	2	2	25	13	+12	20	Final Stage
2	Racing (C)	10	5	2	3	14	11	+3	17	Final Stage
3	Ben Hur	10	4	1	5	18	16	+2	13	
4	General Paz Juniors	10	4	1	5	14	17	−3	13	
5	9 de Julio (R)	10	3	1	6	12	23	−11	10	

==== Zone D ====
Pos	Team	Pld	W	D	L	GF	GA	GD	Pts	Qualification
1	Atlético Tucumán	10	5	1	4	18	11	+7	16	Final Stage
2	Talleres (P)	10	4	4	2	10	8	+2	16	Final Stage
3	Gimnasia y Tiro	10	4	3	3	13	16	−3	15	
4	Ñuñorco	10	3	3	4	14	16	−2	12	
5	13 de Junio (P)	10	3	1	6	9	15	−6	10	

=== Final stage ===
Quarterfinals
C1	Tiro Federal	0	4	4
D2	Talleres (P)	0	0	0
D1	Atlético Tucumán	1	2	3 (3)
C2	Racing (C) (p)	2	1	3 (5)
B1	Luján de Cuyo	1	2	3
A2	Cipolletti	1	0	1
A1	Aldosivi	2	2	4
B2	Independiente Rivadavia	2	1	3

Semifinals
C1	Tiro Federal	1	3	4
C2	Racing (C)	1	2	3
A1	Aldosivi	1	2	3 (3)
B1	Luján de Cuyo (p)	2	1	3 (4)

Final
C1	Tiro Federal	1	1	2
B1	Luján de Cuyo	0	1	1

- Note: The team in the first line plays at home the second leg.

== Overall standings ==
Pos	Team	Pld	W	D	L	GF	GA	GD	Pts	Qualification or relegation
1	Tiro Federal	20	9	8	3	41	23	+18	35	
2	Cipolletti	20	10	5	5	44	30	+14	35	
3	Luján de Cuyo	20	10	4	6	33	18	+15	34	
4	Aldosivi	20	9	7	4	36	25	+11	34	
5	Ñuñorco	20	9	6	5	31	26	+5	33	
6	Douglas Haig	20	9	6	5	28	26	+2	33	
7	Atlético Tucumán	20	9	4	7	38	21	+17	31	
8	Racing (C)	20	8	7	5	22	18	+4	31	
9	Juventud Unida Universitario	20	8	4	8	25	28	−3	28	
10	Ben Hur	20	7	6	7	35	27	+8	27	
11	Independiente Rivadavia	20	7	6	7	35	36	−1	27	
12	Gimnasia y Tiro	20	6	6	8	24	30	−6	24	
13	General Paz Juniors	20	6	6	8	23	30	−7	24	
14	Villa Mitre	20	6	6	8	27	36	−9	24	
15	13 de Junio (P)	20	7	3	10	20	34	−14	24	
16	Talleres (P)	20	5	8	7	17	25	−8	23	
17	Juventud Alianza	20	6	3	11	31	37	−6	21	Relegation Playoff
18	Independiente (VO)	20	4	8	8	21	30	−9	20	Relegation Playoff
19	9 de Julio (R)	20	5	4	11	22	39	−17	19	Torneo Argentino B
20	Estudiantes (RC)	20	4	5	11	20	33	−13	17	Torneo Argentino B

== Championship final ==
Team 1	Agg.	Team 2	1st leg	2nd leg
Tiro Federal	2–1	Racing (C)	1–1	1–0

== Promotion/relegation playoff B Nacional-Torneo Argentino A ==
Team 1	Agg.	Team 2	1st leg	2nd leg
CAI	4–3	Racing (C)	1–1	3–2

- CAI remained in the Primera B Nacional by winning the playoff.

== Relegation playoff ==
Team 1	Agg.	Team 2	1st leg	2nd leg
Relegation/promotion playoff 1
Unión (S)	6–2	Juventud Alianza	5–0	1–2
Relegation/promotion playoff 2
Gimnasia y Esgrima (M)	4–3	Independiente (VO)	3–1	1–2

- Unión (S) was promoted to 2003–04 Torneo Argentino A by winning the playoff and Juventud Alianza was relegated to 2003–04 Torneo Argentino B.
- Gimnasia y Esgrima (M) was promoted to 2003–04 Torneo Argentino A by winning the playoff and Independiente (VO) was relegated to 2003–04 Torneo Argentino B.

== See also ==
- 2002–03 in Argentine football
