= 1995–96 Torneo Argentino A =

I Torneo Argentino A
- Season: 1995–96
- Champions: Juventud Antoniana (1st divisional title)
- Promoted: Juventud Antoniana; Cipolletti; Aldosivi; Chaco For Ever; Gimnasia y Esgrima (CdU); Olimpo
- Relegated: Andino; Estación Quequén

The 1995–96 Argentine Torneo Argentino A was the first season of third division professional football in Argentina. A total of 32 teams competed; the champion was promoted to Primera B Nacional.

== Club information ==
=== Zone A ===
Club	City	Stadium
Andino	La Rioja	Carlos Mercado Luna
Central Norte	Salta	Dr. Luis Güemes
Concepción	Concepción	Stewart Shipton
Desamparados	San Juan	El Serpentario
Juventud Alianza	Santa Lucía	Bosque del Bajo Grande
Juventud Antoniana	Salta	Fray Honorato Pistoia
Unión Santiago	Santiago del Estero	Roberto Molinari
Villa Cubas	Catamarca	Malvinas Argentinas

=== Zone B ===
Club	City	Stadium
Aldosivi	Mar del Plata	José María Minella
Alvarado	Mar del Plata^{1}	(None) ^{1}
Cultural Argentino	General Pico	El Volcán
Estación Quequén	Quequén	Panamericano
Grupo Universitario	Tandil	Municipal General San Martín
Huracán	San Rafael	Pretel Hermanos
Independiente Rivadavia	Mendoza	Bautista Gargantini
San Martín	Mendoza	San Martín

Play their home games at Estadio José María Minella.

=== Zone C ===
Club	City	Stadium
CAI	Comodoro Rivadavia	Estadio Municipal
Cipolletti	Cipolletti	La Visera de Cemento
Deportivo Patagones	Carmen de Patagones	Tricolor
Deportivo Roca	General Roca	Luis Maiolino
General Belgrano	Santa Rosa	Nuevo Rancho Grande
Germinal	Rawson	El Fortín
Olimpo	Bahía Blanca	Roberto Natalio Carminatti
Villa Mitre	Bahía Blanca	El Fortín

=== Zone D ===
Club	City	Stadium
Chaco For Ever	Resistencia	Juan Alberto García
Estudiantes	Río Cuarto	Ciudad de Río Cuarto
Ferrocarril	Concordia	Professor Mariano Amable
General Paz Juniors	Córdoba	General Paz Juniors
Gimnasia y Esgrima	Concepción del Uruguay	Manuel y Ramón Núñez
Guaraní Antonio Franco	Posadas	Clemente F. de Oliveira
Patronato	Paraná	Presbítero Bartolomé Grella
San Martín	Formosa	17 de Octubre

=== Teams from Argentino B that played the Third Stage ===
Club	City	Stadium
Almirante Brown	Arrecifes	Estadio Municipal
Mataderos	Necochea	Panamericano

== First stage ==
=== Zone A ===
Pos	Team	Pld	W	D	L	GF	GA	GD	Pts	Qualification
1	Concepción FC	14	7	4	3	17	8	+9	25	Championship Zone
2	Juventud Antoniana	14	7	3	4	11	9	+2	24	Championship Zone
3	Desamparados	14	4	7	3	16	15	+1	19	Championship Zone
4	Juventud Alianza	14	4	5	5	9	8	+1	17	Championship Zone
5	Andino	14	4	5	5	10	19	−9	17	Relegation Zone
6	Unión Santiago	14	3	7	4	21	18	+3	16	Relegation Zone
7	Central Norte	14	3	6	5	11	13	−2	15	Relegation Zone
8	Villa Cubas	14	3	5	6	13	19	−6	14	Relegation Zone

=== Zone B ===
Pos	Team	Pld	W	D	L	GF	GA	GD	Pts	Qualification
1	San Martín (M)	14	8	3	3	21	21	0	27	Championship Zone
2	Independiente Rivadavia	14	7	4	3	29	14	+15	25	Championship Zone
3	Huracán (SR)	14	7	3	4	20	18	+2	24	Championship Zone
4	Alvarado	14	7	2	5	21	15	+6	23	Championship Zone
5	Aldosivi	14	6	4	4	23	13	+10	22	Relegation Zone
6	Cultural Argentino	14	4	4	6	13	19	−6	16	Relegation Zone
7	Estación Quequén	14	4	3	7	14	15	−1	15	Relegation Zone
8	Grupo Universitario	14	0	3	11	8	34	−26	3	Relegation Zone

=== Zone C ===
Pos	Team	Pld	W	D	L	GF	GA	GD	Pts	Qualification
1	Villa Mitre	14	8	2	4	22	13	+9	26	Championship Zone
2	Cipolletti	14	8	1	5	17	16	+1	25	Championship Zone
3	Germinal	14	6	5	3	18	7	+11	23	Championship Zone
4	Olimpo	14	6	5	3	28	14	+14	23	Championship Zone
5	Deportivo Patagones	14	6	2	6	22	19	+3	20	Relegation Zone
6	Deportivo Roca	14	5	4	5	14	12	+2	19	Relegation Zone
7	General Belgrano	14	2	7	5	8	13	−5	13	Relegation Zone
8	CAI	14	1	2	11	8	43	−35	5	Relegation Zone

=== Zone D ===
Pos	Team	Pld	W	D	L	GF	GA	GD	Pts	Qualification
1	Estudiantes (RC)	14	8	3	3	23	14	+9	27	Championship Zone
2	Gimnasia y Esgrima (CdU)	14	7	3	4	17	15	+2	24	Championship Zone
3	General Paz Juniors	14	5	4	5	19	20	−1	19	Championship Zone
4	Chaco For Ever	14	4	7	3	17	12	+5	19	Championship Zone
5	Ferrocarril (C)	14	5	3	6	20	22	−2	18	Relegation Zone
6	Guaraní Antonio Franco	14	4	4	6	13	15	−2	16	Relegation Zone
7	San Martín (F)	14	3	5	6	13	18	−5	14	Relegation Zone
8	Patronato	14	3	5	6	11	15	−4	14	Relegation Zone

== Second stage ==
=== Championship Stage ===
==== Zone A ====
Pos	Team	Pld	W	D	L	GF	GA	GD	Pts	Qualification
1	Cipolletti	14	7	2	5	30	20	+10	23	Championship Stage
2	Independiente Rivadavia	14	6	3	5	21	21	0	21	Championship Stage
3	Germinal	14	6	2	6	22	16	+6	20	Championship Stage
4	Huracán (SR)	14	5	5	4	18	15	+3	20	Championship Stage
5	Villa Mitre	14	6	2	6	19	26	−7	20	Championship Stage
6	Olimpo	14	5	4	5	24	19	+5	19	
7	Alvarado	14	4	5	5	20	29	−9	17	
8	San Martín (M)	14	4	3	7	19	27	−8	15	

==== Zone B ====
Pos	Team	Pld	W	D	L	GF	GA	GD	Pts	Qualification
1	Juventud Antoniana	14	8	1	5	35	17	+18	25	Championship Stage
2	Concepción FC	14	7	2	5	30	19	+11	23	Championship Stage
3	Chaco For Ever	14	6	5	3	23	22	+1	23	Championship Stage
4	Gimnasia y Esgrima (CdU)	14	6	4	4	25	19	+6	22	Championship Stage
5	Desamparados	14	6	3	5	23	27	−4	21	Championship Stage
6	Estudiantes (RC)	14	6	1	7	19	19	0	19	
7	General Paz Juniors	14	4	2	8	16	27	−11	14	
8	Juventud Alianza	14	2	4	8	8	29	−21	10	

=== Relegation Stage ===
==== Zone A ====
Pos	Team	Pld	W	D	L	GF	GA	GD	Pts	Qualification
1	Aldosivi	12	10	0	2	22	9	+13	30	
2	CAI	12	6	2	4	16	16	0	20	
3	Deportivo Patagones	12	4	5	3	15	13	+2	17	
4	General Belgrano	12	4	5	3	10	10	0	17	
5	Cultural Argentino	12	3	4	5	12	13	−1	13	
6	Grupo Universitario	12	3	2	7	15	17	−2	11	
7	Deportivo Roca	12	2	2	8	12	24	−12	8	Relegation Stage
8	Estación Quequén (Note: Estación Quequén abandoned the tournament for financial problems.)	0	0	0	0	0	0	0	0	Relegation Stage

==== Zone B ====
Pos	Team	Pld	W	D	L	GF	GA	GD	Pts	Qualification
1	Ferrocarril (C)	14	9	1	4	27	17	+10	28	
2	San Martín (F)	14	7	2	5	32	21	+11	23	
3	Unión Santiago	14	7	1	6	31	23	+8	22	
4	Patronato	14	7	1	6	21	18	+3	22	
5	Central Norte	14	7	1	6	24	25	−1	22	
6	Guaraní Antonio Franco	14	6	3	5	30	22	+8	21	
7	Villa Cubas	14	5	3	6	24	25	−1	18	Relegation Stage
8	Andino	14	1	2	11	11	49	−38	5	Relegation Stage

== Third stage ==
=== Championship Stage ===
==== Zone A ====
Pos	Team	Pld	W	D	L	GF	GA	GD	Pts	Qualification
1	Cipolletti	10	7	1	2	18	7	+11	22	Championship Final
2	Germinal	10	6	1	3	23	7	+16	19	
3	Villa Mitre	10	5	1	4	12	15	−3	16	
4	Independiente Rivadavia	10	4	2	4	12	14	−2	14	
5	Huracán (SR)	10	3	2	5	11	15	−4	11	
6	Mataderos	10	0	3	7	8	26	−18	3	

==== Zone B ====
Pos	Team	Pld	W	D	L	GF	GA	GD	Pts	Qualification
1	Juventud Antoniana	10	6	3	1	16	9	+7	21	Championship Final
2	Gimnasia y Esgrima (CdU)	10	5	3	2	20	17	+3	18	
3	Almirante Brown (A)	10	3	5	2	18	8	+10	14	
4	Desamparados	10	4	2	4	17	21	−4	14	
5	Concepción FC	10	3	1	6	15	24	−9	10	
6	Chaco For Ever	10	1	2	7	14	21	−7	5	

=== Relegation Stage ===
Pos	Team	Pld	W	D	L	GF	GA	GD	Pts	Relegation
1	Deportivo Roca	4	2	1	1	6	2	+4	7	
2	Villa Cubas	4	1	2	1	8	5	+3	5	
3	Andino	4	1	1	2	4	11	−7	4	Torneo Argentino B
4	Estación Quequén (Note: Estación Quequén abandoned the tournament for financial problems.)	0	0	0	0	0	0	0	0	Torneo Argentino B

== Championship final ==
Team 1	Agg.	Team 2	1st leg	2nd leg
Promotion playoff 1
Cipolletti	0–1	Juventud Antoniana	0–0	0–1

== Extra Promotion playoffs ==
Team 1	Agg.	Team 2	1st leg	2nd leg
Alvarado	0–4	Aldosivi	0–2	0–2
Promotion playoff 2
Gimnasia y Esgrima (CdU)	4–2	Patronato	2–1	2–1
Promotion playoff 3
Villa Mitre	2–2	Olimpo	0–1	2–1
Extra Match
Olimpo	2–0	Villa Mitre		

- Aldosivi was promoted to 1996–97 Primera B Nacional by winning the playoff.
- Gimnasia y Esgrima (CdU) was promoted to 1996–97 Primera B Nacional by winning the playoff.
- Olimpo was promoted to 1996–97 Primera B Nacional by winning the playoff.

== See also ==
- 1995–96 in Argentine football
