= 1998–99 Torneo Argentino A =

IV Torneo Argentino A
- Season: 1998–99
- Champions: Independiente Rivadavia (1st divisional title); Racing (C) (1st divisional title)
- Promoted: Independiente Rivadavia; Racing (C); Villa Mitre
- Relegated: Central Córdoba (SdE); San Martín (MC)

The 1998–99 Argentine Torneo Argentino A was the fourth season of third division professional football in Argentina. A total of 14 teams competed; the champions were promoted to Primera B Nacional.

== Club information ==
=== Zone A ===
Club	City	Stadium
Ben Hur	Rafaela	Parque Barrio Ilolay
Central Córdoba	Santiago del Estero	Alfredo Terrara
Deportivo Barraca	Paso de los Libres	Agustín Faraldo
Estudiantes	Río Cuarto	Ciudad de Río Cuarto
General Paz Juniors	Córdoba	General Paz Juniors
Ñuñorco	Monteros	Ñuñorco
Patronato	Paraná	Presbítero Bartolomé Grella

=== Zone B ===
Club	City	Stadium
Cultural Argentino	General Pico	El Volcán
General Belgrano	Santa Rosa	Nuevo Rancho Grande
Huracán	San Rafael	Pretel Hermanos
Independiente Rivadavia	Mendoza	Bautista Gargantini
Juventud Alianza	Santa Lucía	Bosque del Bajo Grande
San Martín	Monte Comán	Ovidio Bernues
Villa Mitre	Bahía Blanca	El Fortín

=== Teams from Argentino B that played the Final Stage ===
Club	City	Stadium
13 de Junio	Pirané	Pirané
CAI	Comodoro Rivadavia	Estadio Municipal
Huracán	Tres Arroyos	Roberto Lorenzo Bottino
Racing	Córdoba	Miguel Sancho
Tiro Federal	Rosario	Fortín de Ludueña

== First stage ==
=== Zone A ===
Pos	Team	Pld	W	D	L	GF	GA	GD	Pts	Qualification
1	General Paz Juniors	14	5	8	1	24	14	+10	23	Final Stage
2	Estudiantes (RC)	14	6	4	4	15	14	+1	22	Final Stage
3	Deportivo Barraca (PdlL)	14	5	5	4	24	19	+5	20	Final Stage
4	Patronato	14	4	8	2	12	8	+4	20	Final Stage
5	Ben Hur	14	3	7	4	19	18	+1	16	
6	Ñuñorco	14	4	4	6	16	26	−10	16	
7	Central Córdoba (SdE)	14	3	4	7	17	26	−9	13	Relegation Playoffs

=== Zone B ===
Pos	Team	Pld	W	D	L	GF	GA	GD	Pts	Qualification
1	Independiente Rivadavia	14	8	4	2	28	17	+11	28	Final Stage
2	Villa Mitre	14	7	1	6	25	19	+6	22	Final Stage
3	Huracán (SR)	14	5	5	4	15	17	−2	20	Final Stage
4	Juventud Alianza	14	5	4	5	23	17	+6	19	
5	Cultural Argentino	14	4	4	6	18	25	−7	16	
6	General Belgrano	14	3	4	7	16	25	−9	13	
7	San Martín (MC)	14	2	6	6	12	19	−7	12	Relegation Playoffs

== Final stage ==
=== Zone A ===
Pos	Team	Pld	W	D	L	GF	GA	GD	Pts	Promotion or qualification
1	Independiente Rivadavia	10	7	1	2	21	9	+12	22	Primera B Nacional
2	Villa Mitre	10	5	2	3	24	20	+4	17	Promotion/relegation playoff
3	Patronato	10	5	1	4	13	13	0	16	
4	Huracán (SR)	10	3	3	4	16	16	0	12	
5	Huracán (TA)	10	3	3	4	21	22	−1	12	
6	CAI	10	1	2	7	13	28	−15	5	

=== Zone B ===
Pos	Team	Pld	W	D	L	GF	GA	GD	Pts	Promotion or qualification
1	Racing (C)	10	7	2	1	10	2	+8	23	Primera B Nacional
2	General Paz Juniors	10	6	2	2	14	7	+7	20	Promotion/relegation playoff
3	Tiro Federal	10	5	4	1	14	6	+8	19	
4	Estudiantes (RC)	10	1	4	5	9	12	−3	7	
5	Deportivo Barraca (PdlL)	10	2	1	7	10	21	−11	7	
6	13 de Junio (P)	10	1	3	6	9	18	−9	6	Relegation Playoffs

== Relegation Playoffs ==
=== Semifinals ===
Team 1	Score	Team 2
San Martín (MC)	1–3	13 de Junio (P)

- San Martín (MC) was relegated to 1999–00 Torneo Argentino B.

Team 1	Score	Team 2
Central Córdoba (SdE)	–	Argentinos del Norte

- Argentinos del Norte abandoned the Competition.

=== Final ===
Team 1	Score	Team 2
13 de Junio (P)	3–2	Central Córdoba (SdE)

- 13 de Junio (P) was promoted to 1999–00 Torneo Argentino A by winning the playoff and Central Córdoba (SdE) was relegated to 1999–00 Torneo Argentino B.

== See also ==
- 1998–99 in Argentine football
