= 1999–2000 Torneo Argentino A =

V Torneo Argentino A
- Season: 1999–00
- Champions: General Paz Juniors (1st divisional title)
- Promoted: General Paz Juniors
- Relegated: Estudiantes (RC)
- Biggest home win: Huracán (TA) 6–0 Huracán
- Biggest away win: Patronato 0–3 Dep. Barraca
- Highest scoring: CAI 4–4 Juventud Alianza; Tiro Federal 6–2 Dep. Barraca

The 1999–00 Argentine Torneo Argentino A was the fifth season of third division professional football in Argentina. A total of 16 teams competed; the champion was promoted to Primera B Nacional.

== Club information ==
=== Zone A ===
Club	City	Stadium
CAI	Comodoro Rivadavia	Estadio Municipal
Cultural Argentino	General Pico	El Volcán
Estudiantes	Río Cuarto	Ciudad de Río Cuarto
General Belgrano	Santa Rosa	Nuevo Rancho Grande
General Paz Juniors	Córdoba	General Paz Juniors
Huracán (SR)	San Rafael	Pretel Hermanos
Huracán (TA)	Tres Arroyos	Roberto Lorenzo Bottino
Juventud Alianza	Santa Lucía	Bosque del Bajo Grande

=== Zone B ===
Club	City	Stadium
13 de Junio	Pirané	Pirané
Ben Hur	Rafaela	Parque Barrio Ilolay
Deportivo Barraca	Paso de los Libres	Agustín Faraldo
Douglas Haig	Pergamino	Miguel Morales
Huracán Corrientes	Corrientes	José Antonio Romero Feris
Ñuñorco	Monteros	Ñuñorco
Patronato	Paraná	Presbítero Bartolomé Grella
Tiro Federal	Rosario	Fortín de Ludueña

== First stage ==
=== Zone A ===
Pos	Team	Pld	W	D	L	GF	GA	GD	Pts	Qualification
1	General Paz Juniors	14	7	4	3	17	11	+6	25	Final Stage
2	Huracán (TA)	14	7	1	6	31	21	+10	22	Final Stage
3	General Belgrano	14	5	5	4	14	16	−2	20	Final Stage
4	Huracán (SR)	14	5	4	5	14	20	−6	19	
5	Juventud Alianza	14	5	3	6	18	21	−3	18	
6	Cultural Argentino	14	4	5	5	15	19	−4	17	
7	CAI	14	3	7	4	25	20	+5	16	
8	Estudiantes (RC)	14	2	6	6	12	19	−7	12	Relegation Playoff

==== Results ====
Home \ Away	CAI	CUA	ERC	GBE	GPJ	HSR	HTA	JUA
CAI	—	3–0	2–0	6–1	1–1	1–1	2–2	4–4
Cultural Argentino	2–2	—	1–0	0–0	0–0	2–0	2–0	2–0
Estudiantes (RC)	1–1	2–2	—	1–1	0–0	0–0	2–0	2–1
General Belgrano	2–2	1–1	1–0	—	2–0	2–0	1–0	1–0
General Paz Juniors	2–1	2–1	2–0	1–0	—	2–0	4–1	2–1
Huracán (SR)	1–0	1–0	3–2	1–1	0–0 (Note: The match was suspended at 68' for aggression at General Paz's goalkeeper, therefore Huracán (SR) lost the point.)	—	4–2	2–0
Huracán (TA)	1–0	5–1	4–1	3–1	2–1	6–0	—	4–0
Juventud Alianza	2–0	3–1	1–1	1–0	2–0	1–1	2–1	—

Source: es.wikipedia.org (in Spanish)
Legend: Blue = home team win; Yellow = draw; Red = away team win.

=== Zone B ===
Pos	Team	Pld	W	D	L	GF	GA	GD	Pts	Qualification
1	Ben Hur	14	7	4	3	18	10	+8	25	Final Stage
2	13 de Junio (P)	14	7	4	3	15	14	+1	25	Final Stage
3	Douglas Haig	14	7	2	5	20	14	+6	23	Final Stage
4	Tiro Federal	14	7	2	5	27	16	+11	23	
5	Patronato	14	5	4	5	19	19	0	19	
6	Ñuñorco	14	4	6	4	16	15	+1	18	
7	Deportivo Barraca (PdlL)	14	3	3	8	14	23	−9	12	
8	Huracán Corrientes	14	2	3	9	10	28	−18	9	Relegation Playoff

==== Results ====
Home \ Away	13J	BEN	BAR	DOU	HUC	ÑUÑ	PAT	TIR
13 de Junio	—	1–1	1–0	1–0	3–1	1–0	2–1	1–0
Ben Hur	2–0	—	1–2	3–1	1–0	1–1	0–1	0–0
Deportivo Barraca	0–1	0–2	—	1–1	1–1	0–1	3–2	1–1
Douglas Haig	4–0	0–1	2–0	—	3–0	1–0	0–2	3–0
Huracán Corrientes	0–0	1–3	1–0	0–1 (Note: Originally 3-0 for Huracán, but Douglas Haig won the match because of the home team fielding an ineligible player.)	—	1–0	3–3	1–3
Ñuñorco	1–1	1–1	3–1	3–3	2–1	—	1–1	1–0
Patronato	1–1	0–2	0–3	3–0	2–0	0–0	—	2–0
Tiro Federal	3–1	2–0	6–2	0–1	5–0	3–2	4–1	—

Source: es.wikipedia.org (in Spanish)
Legend: Blue = home team win; Yellow = draw; Red = away team win.

== Final stage ==
Pos	Team	Pld	W	D	L	GF	GA	GD	Pts	Promotion
1	General Paz Juniors	10	5	3	2	16	8	+8	18	Primera B Nacional
2	Huracán (TA)	10	6	0	4	21	17	+4	18	
3	Ben Hur	10	6	0	4	11	14	−3	18	
4	13 de Junio (P)	10	4	3	3	12	10	+2	15	
5	Douglas Haig	10	3	2	5	16	17	−1	11	
6	General Belgrano	10	1	2	7	8	18	−10	5	

=== Results ===
Home \ Away	13J	BEN	DOU	GBE	GPJ	HTA
13 de Junio	—	2–0	3–0	1–0	0–0	3–1
Ben Hur	1–0	—	1–0	2–0	2–1	2–1
Douglas Haig	1–1	3–0	—	3–2	2–2	3–1
General Belgrano	1–1	1–3	2–1	—	1–1	1–3
General Paz Juniors	3–0	3–0	1–0	1–0	—	4–0
Huracán (TA)	3–1	3–0	4–3	2–0	3–0	—

Source: es.wikipedia.org (in Spanish)
Legend: Blue = home team win; Yellow = draw; Red = away team win.

=== Tiebreaker head-to-head ===
Pos	Team	Pld	W	D	L	GF	GA	GD	Pts	Promotion
1	General Paz Juniors	4	2	0	2	8	5	+3	6	Primera B Nacional
2	Huracán (TA)	4	2	0	2	7	6	+1	6	
3	Ben Hur	4	2	0	2	4	8	−4	6	

== Relegation playoff ==
Team 1	Score	Team 2
Huracán Corrientes	3–2	Estudiantes (RC)

- Huracán Corrientes remained in the Torneo Argentino A by winning the playoff and Estudiantes (RC) was relegated to 2000–01 Torneo Argentino B.

== See also ==
- 1999–2000 in Argentine football
