= 2001–02 Torneo Argentino A =

VII Torneo Argentino A
- Season: 2001–02
- Champions: CAI (1st divisional title)
- Promoted: CAI
- Relegated: Cultural Argentino; Huracán Corrientes; Huracán (SR); Patronato

The 2001–02 Argentine Torneo Argentino A was the seventh season of third division professional football in Argentina. A total of 19 teams competed; the champion was promoted to Primera B Nacional.

== Club information ==
=== Zone A ===
Club	City	Stadium
Aldosivi	Mar del Plata	José María Minella
CAI	Comodoro Rivadavia	Estadio Municipal
Cipolletti	Cipolletti	La Visera de Cemento
Cultural Argentino	General Pico	El Volcán
Estudiantes	Río Cuarto	Ciudad de Río Cuarto
General Paz Juniors	Córdoba	General Paz Juniors
Huracán	San Rafael	Pretel Hermanos
Juventud Alianza	Santa Lucía	Bosque del Bajo Grande
Juventud Unida Universitario	San Luis	Mario Diez
Luján de Cuyo	Luján de Cuyo	Jardín del Bajo

=== Zone B ===
Club	City	Stadium
13 de Junio	Pirané	Pirané
9 de Julio	Rafaela	El Coloso
Ben Hur	Rafaela	Parque Barrio Ilolay
Douglas Haig	Pergamino	Miguel Morales
Gimnasia y Tiro	Salta	Gigante del Norte
Huracán Corrientes	Corrientes	José Antonio Romero Feris
Ñuñorco	Monteros	Ñuñorco
Patronato	Paraná	Presbítero Bartolomé Grella
San Martín (T)	San Miguel de Tucumán	La Ciudadela
Tiro Federal	Rosario	Fortín de Ludueña

== First stage ==
=== Zone A ===
Pos	Team	Pld	W	D	L	GF	GA	GD	Pts	Qualification or relegation
1	CAI	16	6	7	3	32	28	+4	25	Final Stage
2	Estudiantes (RC)	16	6	6	4	27	18	+9	24	Final Stage
3	Juventud Unida Universitario	16	6	6	4	25	18	+7	24	Final Stage
4	Luján de Cuyo	16	6	6	4	21	18	+3	24	
5	Juventud Alianza	16	7	2	7	28	31	−3	23	
6	General Paz Juniors	16	6	4	6	30	26	+4	22	
7	Aldosivi	16	5	7	4	16	12	+4	22	Relegation Playoff
8	Cipolletti	16	4	4	8	20	27	−7	16	Relegation Playoff
9	Huracán (SR)	16	3	4	9	9	28	−19	13	Torneo Argentino B
10	Cultural Argentino (Note: Cultural Argentino withdrew before the tournament.)	0	0	0	0	0	0	0	0	Torneo Argentino B

=== Zone B ===
Pos	Team	Pld	W	D	L	GF	GA	GD	Pts	Qualification or relegation
1	Ñuñorco	18	10	5	3	40	22	+18	35	Final Stage
2	13 de Junio (P)	18	8	8	2	28	19	+9	32	Final Stage
3	Ben Hur	18	9	3	6	32	22	+10	30	Final Stage
4	Tiro Federal	18	8	6	4	34	26	+8	30	
5	Douglas Haig	18	8	4	6	31	18	+13	28	
6	9 de Julio	18	9	1	8	27	34	−7	28	
7	Gimnasia y Tiro	18	7	5	6	21	21	0	26	Relegation Playoff
8	San Martín (T)	18	6	5	7	22	23	−1	23	Relegation Playoff
9	Patronato	18	2	3	13	25	44	−19	9	Torneo Argentino B
10	Huracán Corrientes	18	1	4	13	18	49	−31	7	Torneo Argentino B

== Final stage ==
Pos	Team	Pld	W	D	L	GF	GA	GD	Pts	Promotion
1	CAI	10	6	2	2	17	11	+6	20	Primera B Nacional
2	Ñuñorco	10	4	2	4	17	17	0	14	
3	Ben Hur	10	2	6	2	16	14	+2	12	
4	Estudiantes (RC)	10	3	3	4	15	17	−2	12	
5	Juventud Unida Universitario	10	3	2	5	17	20	−3	11	
6	13 de Junio (P)	10	2	5	3	16	19	−3	11	

== Relegation playoff ==
=== Relegation playoff Qualifying ===
Team 1	Score	Team 2
Aldosivi	2–0	Gimnasia y Tiro

- Aldosivi remained in Torneo Argentino A and Gimnasia y Tiro played the Relegation Playoff.

Team 1	Score	Team 2
Cipolletti	3–2	San Martín (T)

- San Martín (T) was relegated to Torneo Argentino B and Cipoletti played the Relegation Playoff.

=== Relegation playoff ===
Team 1	Agg.	Team 2	1st leg	2nd leg
Relegation/promotion playoff 1
Bella Vista (BB)	3–3 (4–5 p)	Cipolletti	2–1	1–2
Relegation/promotion playoff 2
San Cristóbal	3–4	Gimnasia y Tiro	2–1	1–3

- Cipolletti remained in the Torneo Argentino A by winning the playoff.
- Gimnasia y Tiro remained in the Torneo Argentino A by winning the playoff.

== See also ==
- 2001–02 in Argentine football
