= 2003–04 Torneo Argentino A =

IX Torneo Argentino A
- Season: 2003–04
- Champions: Racing (C) (2nd divisional title)
- Promoted: Racing (C)
- Relegated: Almirante Brown (A); Gimnasia y Esgrima (M); 13 de Junio (P)

The 2003–04 Argentine Torneo Argentino A was the ninth season of third division professional football in Argentina. A total of 20 teams competed; the champion was promoted to Primera B Nacional.

== Club information ==
=== Zone A ===
Club	City	Stadium
Aldosivi	Mar del Plata	José María Minella
Almirante Brown	Arrecifes	Estadio Municipal
Douglas Haig	Pergamino	Miguel Morales
Guillermo Brown	Puerto Madryn	Raul Conti
Villa Mitre	Bahía Blanca	El Fortín

=== Zone B ===
Club	City	Stadium
Cipolletti	Cipolletti	La Visera de Cemento
Gimnasia y Esgrima	Mendoza	Víctor Antonio Legrotaglie
Independiente Rivadavia	Mendoza	Bautista Gargantini
Juventud Unida Universitario	San Luis	Mario Diez
Luján de Cuyo	Luján de Cuyo	Jardín del Bajo

=== Zone C ===
Club	City	Stadium
13 de Junio	Pirané	Pirané
Ben Hur	Rafaela	Parque Barrio Ilolay
General Paz Juniors	Córdoba	General Paz Juniors
Racing	Córdoba	Miguel Sancho
Unión	Sunchales	La Fortaleza

=== Zone D ===
Club	City	Stadium
Atlético Tucumán	Tucumán	Monumental José Fierro
Gimnasia y Tiro	Salta	Gigante del Norte
La Florida	La Florida	Capitán Jaime Solá
Ñuñorco	Monteros	Ñuñorco
Talleres	Perico	Plinio Zabala

== Apertura 2003 ==
=== First stage ===
In every round the bye team played against the bye team of the other zone: Team from Zone A vs Team from Zone B and Team from Zone C vs Team from Zone D.

==== Zone A ====
Pos	Team	Pld	W	D	L	GF	GA	GD	Pts	Qualification
1	Villa Mitre	10	6	1	3	19	14	+5	19	Final Stage
2	Aldosivi	10	5	3	2	19	10	+9	18	Final Stage
3	Douglas Haig	10	5	2	3	11	8	+3	17	
4	Guillermo Brown	10	2	4	4	11	14	−3	10	
5	Almirante Brown (A)	10	0	0	10	2	27	−25	0	

==== Zone B ====
Pos	Team	Pld	W	D	L	GF	GA	GD	Pts	Qualification
1	Luján de Cuyo	10	6	3	1	24	11	+13	21	Final Stage
2	Cipolletti	10	5	3	2	16	15	+1	18	Final Stage
3	Independiente Rivadavia	10	4	3	3	18	14	+4	15	
4	Juventud Unida Universitario	10	2	4	4	14	16	−2	10	
5	Gimnasia y Esgrima (Mza)	10	2	3	5	12	17	−5	9	

==== Zone C ====
Pos	Team	Pld	W	D	L	GF	GA	GD	Pts	Qualification
1	Racing (C)	10	6	2	2	18	9	+9	20	Final Stage
2	General Paz Juniors	10	4	1	5	16	17	−1	13	Final Stage
3	13 de Junio (P)	10	3	3	4	11	19	−8	12	
4	Unión (S)	10	3	2	5	12	19	−7	11	
5	Ben Hur	10	2	3	5	10	13	−3	9	

==== Zone D ====
Pos	Team	Pld	W	D	L	GF	GA	GD	Pts	Qualification
1	Atlético Tucumán	10	5	3	2	16	10	+6	18	Final Stage
2	Talleres (P)	10	5	3	2	14	11	+3	18	Final Stage
3	Ñuñorco	10	3	4	3	17	15	+2	13	
4	La Florida	10	3	4	3	13	11	+2	13	
5	Gimnasia y Tiro	10	1	5	4	16	19	−3	8	

=== Final stage ===
Quarterfinals
C1	Racing (C)	1	2	3
D2	Talleres (P)	0	2	2
D1	Atlético Tucumán	2	1	3 (5)
C2	General Paz Juniors (p)	3	0	3 (6)
B1	Luján de Cuyo	1	1	2
A2	Aldosivi	2	1	3
A1	Villa Mitre	1	3	4 (3)
B2	Cipolletti (p)	2	2	4 (5)

Semifinals
C1	Racing (C)	0	2	2
C2	General Paz Juniors	0	0	0
A2	Aldosivi	0	2	2
B2	Cipolletti	1	2	3

Final
C1	Racing (C)	1	3	4
B2	Cipolletti	3	0	3

- Note: The team in the first line plays at home the second leg.

== Clausura 2004 ==
=== First stage ===
In every round the bye team played against the bye team of the other zone: Team from Zone A vs Team from Zone B and Team from Zone C vs Team from Zone D.

==== Zone A ====
Pos	Team	Pld	W	D	L	GF	GA	GD	Pts	Qualification
1	Aldosivi	10	7	2	1	16	5	+11	23	Final Stage
2	Douglas Haig	10	6	4	0	14	3	+11	22	Final Stage
3	Guillermo Brown	10	4	3	3	10	7	+3	15	
4	Villa Mitre	10	3	0	7	8	14	−6	9	
5	Almirante Brown (A)	10	0	0	10	5	24	−19	0	

==== Zone B ====
Pos	Team	Pld	W	D	L	GF	GA	GD	Pts	Qualification
1	Luján de Cuyo	10	5	3	2	7	5	+2	18	Final Stage
2	Cipolletti	10	5	2	3	15	11	+4	17	Final Stage
3	Juventud Unida Universitario	10	4	4	2	12	8	+4	16	
4	Independiente Rivadavia	10	4	1	5	14	14	0	13	
5	Gimnasia y Esgrima (Mza)	10	2	3	5	6	16	−10	6 (Note: 3 points deducted.)	

==== Zone C ====
Pos	Team	Pld	W	D	L	GF	GA	GD	Pts	Qualification
1	General Paz Juniors	10	6	1	3	17	11	+6	19	Final Stage
2	Ben Hur	10	5	3	2	14	8	+6	18	Final Stage
3	Unión (S)	10	4	2	4	14	14	0	14	
4	Racing (C)	10	3	4	3	13	11	+2	13	
5	13 de Junio (P)	10	2	2	6	7	18	−11	8	

==== Zone D ====
Pos	Team	Pld	W	D	L	GF	GA	GD	Pts	Qualification
1	La Florida	10	6	2	2	13	9	+4	20	Final Stage
2	Atlético Tucumán	10	4	3	3	15	10	+5	15	Final Stage
3	Gimnasia y Tiro	10	2	5	3	9	11	−2	11	
4	Ñuñorco	10	1	5	4	8	13	−5	8	
5	Talleres (P)	10	1	5	4	7	12	−5	8	

=== Final stage ===
Quarterfinals
A1	Aldosivi (p)	1	3	4 (7)
B2	Cipolletti	3	1	4 (6)
B1	Luján de Cuyo	0	1	1
A2	Douglas Haig	3	3	6
D1	La Florida	1	2	3
C2	Ben Hur	2	0	2
C1	General Paz Juniors	0	0	0
D2	Atlético Tucumán	1	2	3

Semifinals
A1	Aldosivi	0	1	1
A2	Douglas Haig	2	0	2
D1	La Florida	2	1	3
D2	Atlético Tucumán	3	1	4

Final
A2	Douglas Haig	1	1	2
D2	Atlético Tucumán	2	1	3

- Note: The team in the first line plays at home the second leg.

== Overall standings ==
Pos	Team	Pld	W	D	L	GF	GA	GD	Pts	Qualification or relegation
1	Aldosivi	20	12	5	3	35	15	+20	41	
2	Luján de Cuyo	20	11	6	3	31	16	+15	39	
3	Douglas Haig	20	11	6	3	25	11	+14	39	
4	Cipolletti	20	10	5	5	31	26	+5	35	
5	Atlético Tucumán	20	9	6	5	31	20	+11	33	
6	Racing (C)	20	9	6	5	31	20	+11	33	
7	La Florida	20	9	6	5	26	20	+6	33	
8	General Paz Juniors	20	10	2	8	33	28	+5	32	
9	Independiente Rivadavia	20	8	4	8	32	28	+4	28	
10	Villa Mitre	20	9	1	10	27	28	−1	28	
11	Ben Hur	20	7	6	7	24	21	+3	27	
12	Juventud Unida Universitario	20	6	8	6	26	24	+2	26	
13	Talleres (P)	20	6	8	6	21	23	−2	26	
14	Guillermo Brown	20	6	7	7	21	21	0	25	
15	Unión (S)	20	7	4	9	26	33	−7	25	
16	Ñuñorco	20	4	9	7	25	28	−3	21	
17	13 de Junio (P)	20	5	5	10	18	37	−19	20	Relegation Playoff
18	Gimnasia y Tiro	20	3	10	7	25	30	−5	19	Relegation Playoff
19	Gimnasia y Esgrima (Mza)	20	3	6	11	18	33	−15	12 (Note: 3 points deducted.)	Torneo Argentino B
20	Almirante Brown (A)	20	0	0	20	7	51	−44	0	Torneo Argentino B

== Championship final ==
Team 1	Agg.	Team 2	1st leg	2nd leg
Racing (C)	4–3	Atlético Tucumán	1–1	3–2

== Promotion/relegation playoff B Nacional-Torneo Argentino A ==
Team 1	Agg.	Team 2	1st leg	2nd leg
CAI	1–1	Atlético Tucumán	1–0	0–1

- CAI remained in the Torneo Argentino A after a 1-1 aggregate tie by virtue of a "sports advantage". In case of a tie in goals, the team from the Torneo Argentino A gets to stay in it.

== Relegation playoff ==
Team 1	Agg.	Team 2	1st leg	2nd leg
Relegation/promotion playoff 1
Rosario Puerto Belgrano	3–1	13 de Junio (P)	3–0	0–1
Relegation/promotion playoff 2
Alumni (VM)	2–3	Gimnasia y Tiro	1–1	1–2

- Rosario Puerto Belgrano was promoted to 2004–05 Torneo Argentino A by winning the playoff and Racing (O) was relegated to 2004–05 Torneo Argentino B.
- Gimnasia y Tiro remained in the Torneo Argentino A by winning the playoff.

== See also ==
- 2003–04 in Argentine football
