= 2004–05 Torneo Argentino A =

X Torneo Argentino A
- Season: 2004–05
- Champions: Ben Hur (1st divisional title)
- Promoted: Ben Hur; Aldosivi
- Relegated: Rosario Puerto Belgrano; Gimnasia y Tiro

The 2004–05 Argentine Torneo Argentino A was the tenth season of third division professional football in Argentina. A total of 20 teams competed; the champion was promoted to Primera B Nacional.

== Club information ==
=== Zone A ===
Club	City	Stadium
Atlético Tucumán	Tucumán	Monumental José Fierro
Gimnasia y Tiro	Salta	Gigante del Norte
La Florida	La Florida	Capitán Jaime Solá
Ñuñorco	Monteros	Ñuñorco
Talleres	Perico	Plinio Zabala

=== Zone B ===
Club	City	Stadium
Desamparados	San Juan	El Serpentario
General Paz Juniors	Córdoba	General Paz Juniors
Independiente Rivadavia	Mendoza	Bautista Gargantini
Juventud Unida Universitario	San Luis	Mario Diez
Luján de Cuyo	Luján de Cuyo	Jardín del Bajo

=== Zone C ===
Club	City	Stadium
Atlético Candelaria	Candelaria	Anastacio Cabrera
Ben Hur	Rafaela	Parque Barrio Ilolay
Douglas Haig	Pergamino	Miguel Morales
Gimnasia y Esgrima	Concepción del Uruguay	Manuel y Ramón Núñez
Unión	Sunchales	La Fortaleza

=== Zone D ===
Club	City	Stadium
Aldosivi	Mar del Plata	José María Minella
Cipolletti	Cipolletti	La Visera de Cemento
Guillermo Brown	Puerto Madryn	Raul Conti
Rosario Puerto Belgrano	Punta Alta	El Coloso de Cemento
Villa Mitre	Bahía Blanca	El Fortín

== Apertura 2004 ==
=== First stage ===
In every round the bye team played against the bye team of the other zone: Team from Zone A vs Team from Zone B and Team from Zone C vs Team from Zone D.

==== Zone A ====
Pos	Team	Pld	W	D	L	GF	GA	GD	Pts	Qualification
1	Atlético Tucumán	10	6	2	2	20	10	+10	20	Final Stage
2	Talleres (P)	10	4	2	4	15	10	+5	14	Final Stage
3	Ñuñorco	10	4	1	5	8	10	−2	13	Revalida Stage
4	Gimnasia y Tiro	10	4	1	5	11	14	−3	13	Revalida Stage
5	La Florida	10	3	0	7	6	16	−10	9	

==== Zone B ====
Pos	Team	Pld	W	D	L	GF	GA	GD	Pts	Qualification
1	Luján de Cuyo	10	6	3	1	15	9	+6	21	Final Stage
2	Desamparados	10	4	3	3	15	14	+1	15	Final Stage
3	General Paz Juniors	10	3	3	4	14	13	+1	12	Revalida Stage
4	Juventud Unida Universitario	10	2	3	5	9	14	−5	9	Revalida Stage
5	Independiente Rivadavia	10	4	1	5	11	11	0	4 (Note: 9 points deducted)	

==== Zone C ====
Pos	Team	Pld	W	D	L	GF	GA	GD	Pts	Qualification
1	Ben Hur	10	6	2	2	15	9	+6	20	Final Stage
2	Douglas Haig	10	5	3	2	19	14	+5	18	Final Stage
3	Atlético Candelaria	10	4	2	4	14	12	+2	14	Revalida Stage
4	Gimnasia y Esgrima (CdU)	10	2	4	4	10	14	−4	10	Revalida Stage
5	Unión (S)	10	1	5	4	13	20	−7	8	

==== Zone D ====
Pos	Team	Pld	W	D	L	GF	GA	GD	Pts	Qualification
1	Cipolletti	10	5	3	2	13	10	+3	18	Final Stage
2	Aldosivi	10	3	5	2	17	14	+3	14	Final Stage
3	Guillermo Brown	10	3	4	3	10	10	0	13	Revalida Stage
4	Villa Mitre	10	2	5	3	16	15	+1	11	Revalida Stage
5	Rosario Puerto Belgrano	10	2	2	6	9	20	−11	8	

=== Second stage ===
==== Final stage ====
Quarterfinals
B1	Luján de Cuyo	1	3	4
D2	Aldosivi	0	1	1
D1	Cipolletti	0	0	0
B2	Desamparados	2	1	3
C1	Ben Hur	1	3	4
A2	Talleres (P)	0	1	1
A1	Atlético Tucumán	1	4	5
C2	Douglas Haig	3	0	3

Semifinals
B1	Luján de Cuyo	0	1	1(4)
B2	Desamparados (p)	1	0	1(5)
C1	Ben Hur	2	2	4
A1	Atlético Tucumán	1	2	3

Final
C1	Ben Hur	1	3	4
B2	Desamparados	0	0	0

- Note: The team in the first line plays at home the second leg.

==== Revalida Stage ====
First Round
First Leg
Home	Result	Away
Gimnasia y Esgrima (CdU)	2 - 2	Gimnasia y Tiro
Ñuñorco	1 - 1	Atlético Candelaria
Juventud Unida Universitario	2 - 0	Guillermo Brown
Villa Mitre	1 - 4	General Paz Juniors
Second Leg
Gimnasia y Tiro	3 - 0	Gimnasia y Esgrima (CdU)
Atlético Candelaria	3 - 1	Ñuñorco
Guillermo Brown	5 - 1	Juventud Unida Universitario
General Paz Juniors	6 - 1	Villa Mitre

Second Round
First Leg
Home	Result	Away
Guillermo Brown	4 - 0	Cipolletti
Atlético Candelaria	0 - 0	Talleres (P)
General Paz Juniors	1 - 0	Aldosivi
Gimnasia y Tiro	0 - 0	Douglas Haig
Second Leg
Cipolletti	1 - 1	Guillermo Brown
Talleres (P)	(3) 0 - 0 (5)	Atlético Candelaria (p)
Aldosivi	1 - 1	General Paz Juniors
Douglas Haig	(1) 1 - 1 (2)	Gimnasia y Tiro (p)

Third Round
First Leg
Home	Result	Away
Guillermo Brown	2 - 1	Atlético Candelaria
General Paz Juniors	2 - 1	Luján de Cuyo
Gimnasia y Tiro	4 - 0	Atlético Tucumán
Second Leg
Atlético Candelaria	4 - 2	Guillermo Brown
Luján de Cuyo	3 - 0	General Paz Juniors
Atlético Tucumán (p)	(4) 6 - 2 (2)	Gimnasia y Tiro

Semifinals
First Leg
Home	Result	Away
Atlético Tucumán	0 - 0	Luján de Cuyo
Atlético Candelaria	2 - 2	Desamparados
Second Leg
Luján de Cuyo	1 - 0	Atlético Tucumán
Desamparados	1 - 2	Atlético Candelaria

Final
First Leg
Home	Result	Away
Atlético Candelaria	1 - 0	Luján de Cuyo
Second Leg
Luján de Cuyo	2 - 0	Atlético Candelaria

== Clausura 2005 ==
=== First stage ===
In every round the bye team played against the bye team of the other zone: Team from Zone A vs Team from Zone B and Team from Zone C vs Team from Zone D.

==== Zone A ====
Pos	Team	Pld	W	D	L	GF	GA	GD	Pts	Qualification
1	Atlético Tucumán	10	6	2	2	17	12	+5	20	Final Stage
2	La Florida	10	4	4	2	13	8	+5	16	Final Stage
3	Ñuñorco	10	3	3	4	16	21	−5	12	Revalida Stage
4	Gimnasia y Tiro (Note: Didn't qualify for the Revalida Stage as it was involved in Relegation Playoff Qualifying)	10	1	5	4	12	16	−4	8	
5	Talleres (P)	10	2	2	6	9	19	−10	8	Revalida Stage

==== Zone B ====
Pos	Team	Pld	W	D	L	GF	GA	GD	Pts	Qualification
1	Luján de Cuyo	10	5	3	2	16	9	+7	18	Final Stage
2	Juventud Unida Universitario	10	4	4	2	13	10	+3	16	Final Stage
3	Desamparados	10	4	3	3	18	11	+7	15	Revalida Stage
4	Independiente Rivadavia (Note: Didn't qualify for the Revalida Stage as it was involved in Relegation Playoff Qualifying.)	10	3	3	4	13	14	−1	12	
5	General Paz Juniors	10	3	1	6	8	17	−9	10	Revalida Stage

==== Zone C ====
Pos	Team	Pld	W	D	L	GF	GA	GD	Pts	Qualification
1	Unión (S)	10	6	2	2	20	12	+8	20	Final Stage
2	Douglas Haig	10	5	3	2	21	12	+9	18	Final Stage
3	Ben Hur	10	4	4	2	17	10	+7	16	Revalida Stage
4	Atlético Candelaria	10	3	1	6	13	19	−6	10	Revalida Stage
5	Gimnasia y Esgrima (CdU)	10	2	2	6	10	21	−11	8	

==== Zone D ====
Pos	Team	Pld	W	D	L	GF	GA	GD	Pts	Qualification
1	Aldosivi	10	5	3	2	15	6	+9	18	Final Stage
2	Guillermo Brown	10	6	0	4	16	17	−1	18	Final Stage
3	Cipolletti	10	3	3	4	17	15	+2	12	Revalida Stage
4	Villa Mitre	10	3	2	5	16	20	−4	11	Revalida Stage
5	Rosario Puerto Belgrano	10	2	1	7	10	23	−13	7	

=== Second stage ===
==== Final stage ====
Quarterfinals
B1	Luján de Cuyo	0	3	3
D2	Guillermo Brown	1	1	2
D1	Aldosivi	0	5	5
B2	Juventud Unida Universitario	1	2	3
C1	Unión (S) (p)	1	2	3(3)
A2	La Florida	3	0	3(2)
A1	Atlético Tucumán	1	3	4
C2	Douglas Haig	1	0	1

Semifinals
B1	Luján de Cuyo	1	1	2
D1	Aldosivi	2	3	5
C1	Unión (S)	3	1	4
A1	Atlético Tucumán	2	0	2

Final
C1	Unión (S)	0	2	2
D1	Aldosivi	3	2	5

- Note: The team in the first line plays at home the second leg.

==== Revalida Stage ====
First Round
First Leg
Home	Result	Away
Villa Mitre	2 - 0	Desamparados
General Paz Juniors	4 - 3	Cipolletti
Atlético Candelaria	1 - 1	Ñuñorco
Talleres (P)	2 - 1	Ben Hur
Second Leg
Desamparados	3 - 0	Villa Mitre
Cipolletti	(2) 3 - 2 (4)	General Paz Juniors (p)
Ñuñorco	3 - 1	Atlético Candelaria
Ben Hur	5 - 0	Talleres (P)

Second Round
First Leg
Home	Result	Away
Ben Hur	2 - 0	La Florida
Ñuñorco	1 - 1	Douglas Haig
Desamparados	3 - 0	Guillermo Brown
General Paz Juniors	0 - 1	Juventud Unida Universitario
Second Leg
La Florida	(2) 3 - 1 (4)	Ben Hur (p)
Douglas Haig	4 - 0	Ñuñorco
Guillermo Brown	(2) 5 - 2 (3)	Desamparados (p)
Juventud Unida Universitario	1 - 1	General Paz Juniors

Third Round
First Leg
Home	Result	Away
Ben Hur	1 - 2	Atlético Tucumán
Desamparados	0 - 0	Luján de Cuyo
Juventud Unida Universitario	4 - 3	Douglas Haig
Second Leg
Atlético Tucumán	5 - 2	Ben Hur
Luján de Cuyo	1 - 0	Desamparados
Douglas Haig (p)	(4) 1 - 0 (3)	Juventud Unida Universitario

Semifinals
First Leg
Home	Result	Away
Douglas Haig	3 - 0	Unión (S)
Luján de Cuyo	0 - 0	Atlético Tucumán
Second Leg
Unión (S)	2 - 1	Douglas Haig
Atlético Tucumán	(2) 2 - 2 (4)	Luján de Cuyo (p)

Final
First Leg
Home	Result	Away
Douglas Haig	0 - 0	Luján de Cuyo
Second Leg
Luján de Cuyo (p)	(4) 2 - 2 (2)	Douglas Haig

== Overall standings ==
=== Zone A ===
Pos	Team	Pld	W	D	L	GF	GA	GD	Pts	Qualification
1	Atlético Tucumán	20	12	4	4	37	22	+15	40	
2	La Florida	20	7	4	9	19	24	−5	25	
3	Ñuñorco	20	7	4	9	24	31	−7	25	
4	Talleres (P)	20	6	4	10	24	29	−5	22	
5	Gimnasia y Tiro	20	5	6	9	23	30	−7	21	Relegation Playoff Qualifying

=== Zone B ===
Pos	Team	Pld	W	D	L	GF	GA	GD	Pts	Qualification
1	Luján de Cuyo	20	11	6	3	31	18	+13	39	
2	Desamparados	20	8	6	6	33	25	+8	30	
3	Juventud Unida Universitario	20	6	7	7	22	24	−2	25	
4	General Paz Juniors	20	6	4	10	22	30	−8	22	
5	Independiente Rivadavia (Note: 9 points deducted in Torneo Apertura 2004.)	20	7	4	9	24	25	−1	25	Relegation Playoff Qualifying

=== Zone C ===
Pos	Team	Pld	W	D	L	GF	GA	GD	Pts	Qualification
1	Douglas Haig	20	10	6	4	40	26	+14	36	
2	Ben Hur	20	10	6	4	32	19	+13	36	
3	Unión (S)	20	7	7	6	33	32	+1	28	
4	Atlético Candelaria	20	7	3	10	27	31	−4	24	
5	Gimnasia y Esgrima (CdU)	20	4	6	10	20	35	−15	18	Relegation Playoff Qualifying

=== Zone D ===
Pos	Team	Pld	W	D	L	GF	GA	GD	Pts	Qualification
1	Aldosivi	20	8	8	4	32	20	+12	32	
2	Guillermo Brown	20	9	4	7	26	27	−1	31	
3	Cipolletti	20	8	6	6	30	25	+5	30	
4	Villa Mitre	20	5	7	8	32	35	−3	22	
5	Rosario Puerto Belgrano	20	4	3	13	19	43	−24	15	Relegation Playoff Qualifying

== Championship final ==
Team 1	Agg.	Team 2	1st leg	2nd leg
Ben Hur	5–2	Aldosivi	1–1	4–1

- Aldosivi played the Promotion Playoff Qualifying against the Revalida Final winner.

== Revalida Final ==
Team 1	Agg.	Team 2	1st leg	2nd leg
Luján de Cuyo	5–3	Douglas Haig	2–1	3–2

- Lujan de Cuyo played the Promotion Playoff Qualifying against the Championship Final loser.

== Promotion playoff qualifying ==
Team 1	Agg.	Team 2	1st leg	2nd leg
Aldosivi	2–2 (4–1 p)	Luján de Cuyo	1–1	1–1

- Aldosivi played the Promotion/relegation playoff B Nacional-Torneo Argentino A.

== Promotion/relegation playoff B Nacional-Torneo Argentino A ==
Team 1	Agg.	Team 2	1st leg	2nd leg
Racing (C)	2–4	Aldosivi	0–1	2–3

- Aldosivi was promoted to 2005–06 Primera B Nacional by winning the playoff and |Racing (C) was relegated to 2005–06 Torneo Argentino A.

== Relegation playoff Qualifying ==
Team 1	Agg.	Team 2	1st leg	2nd leg
Independiente Rivadavia	2–0	Rosario Puerto Belgrano	0–0	2–0

- Rosario Puerto Belgrano was relegated to Torneo Argentino B and Independiente Rivadavia played the Relegation Playoff.

Team 1	Agg.	Team 2	1st leg	2nd leg
Gimnasia y Tiro	0–8	Gimnasia y Esgrima (CdU)	0–8	0–0

- Gimnasia y Tiro was relegated to Torneo Argentino B and Gimnasia y Esgrima (CdU) played the Relegation Playoff.

== Relegation playoff ==
Team 1	Agg.	Team 2	1st leg	2nd leg
Relegation/promotion playoff 1
Real Arroyo Seco	0–1	Gimnasia y Esgrima (CdU)	0–1^{1}	0–0
Relegation/promotion playoff 2
Juventud (P)	0–4	Independiente Rivadavia	0–1	0–3

1: First leg awarded 0-1; originally 3-0 but Real Arroyo Seco used ineligible players.

- Gimnasia y Esgrima (CdU) remained in the Torneo Argentino A by winning the playoff.
- Independiente Rivadavia remained in the Torneo Argentino A by winning the playoff.

== See also ==
- 2004–05 in Argentine football
