= Torneo Argentino A =

- Organising body: AFA
- Founded: 1995
- Folded: 2014; 12 years ago
- Country: Argentina
- Number of clubs: 24 (2014)
- Level on pyramid: 3
- Promotion to: Primera B Nacional
- Relegation to: Torneo Argentino B
- Domestic cup: Copa Argentina
- Last champions: Santamarina (2013–14)
- Most championships: Juventud Antoniana; Racing (C); Independiente Rivadavia (2 titles each)
- Broadcaster(s): TeleRed Sports, CVC Sports & One Sports (1995–1999); Cablehogar (1996–2000); Supercanal (1996–2001); Rawson TV Cable (1996–2002); Unicable (1996–2003); TVD Sports (1999–2004); PSN, ESPN, FOX Sports, NBC Sports, PBS Sports, Setanta Sports, CMD & TVC Sports (2000–2004); Eleven Sports (2004–2008); Lobo TV (2006–2009)
- Website: Official webpage
- Current: 2013–14 season

The Torneo Argentino A (in English "Argentine A Tournament") was one of the two leagues that formed the regionalised third level of the Argentine football league system. Clubs in the Torneo Argentino have indirect membership in AFA, while clubs in the Primera B Metropolitana (the other third division) have direct membership in AFA. All teams with indirect membership are from outside the city of Buenos Aires and its metropolitan area (Greater Buenos Aires), while most of the direct members are from the aforementioned area.

== Final format (2013–2014) ==
=== First stage ===
The teams were divided into two zones, North and South, all of which went to the Second Stage: the first four of each zone and the fifth best team of both zones qualified to the "Nonagonal Final", and the other teams qualified to Revalida Stage. All teams play each other in a round-robin tournament.

=== Second stage ===
==== Nonagonal final ====
Consisted of nine teams that qualified from the First Stage. The tournament winner was promoted to the 2014 Primera B Nacional. The 2nd and 3rd teams advanced directly to the Fourth Stage, while the 4th to the 9th advanced to the Third Stage.

==== "Revalida Stage" ====
The fifteen clubs that did not qualify for the Nonagonal Final were grouped into three zones of five teams each. To integrate the zones a table was drawn with the fifteen clubs and its overall standings with points obtained in the First Stage. Teams in position 1,6,7,12,15 went to Zone A; teams in position 2,5,8,11,14 went to Zone B and teams in position 3,4,9,10,13 went to Zone C. The 1st and the 2nd of each zone qualified to the Third Stage.

=== Third to sixth stage ===
Was played by the teams ranked 2nd to 9th in the Nonagonal Final and the teams that qualified from Revalida Stage. To order the matches a table was drawn which contained the teams from the Nonagonal Final and the teams from the Revalida numbering them from 2º to 15º (teams from Nonagonal Final were 2º to 9º and teams from Revalida were 10º to º15).

==== Third stage ====
This Stage was played by the teams ranked 4º to 9º from the Nonagonal Final and the teams from the Revalida. The winning teams qualify for Fourth Stage. In case of a tie of points and goal difference, the teams from position 4º to 9º qualified to the next stage.

==== Fourth stage ====
This Stage was played by the teams ranked 2º and 3º from the Nonagonal Final and the teams that qualified from the Third Stage. In case of a tie points and goal difference, the teams from position 2º, 3º, W1 and W2 qualified to the next stage.

==== Fifth stage ====
This Stage was played by the teams that qualified from the Fourth Stage. The matches will be W1 vs W4 and W2 vs W3. In case of a tie points and goal difference, W1 and W2 qualified for the next stage.

==== Sixth stage ====
This Stage was played by the teams that qualified from the Fifth Stage, W1 vs W2. The winning team will be promoted to 2014 Primera B Nacional. In case of a tie points and goal difference, W1 was promoted.

=== Relegation ===
After the Revalida Stage a table was drawn up with the addition of points of the First Stage and Revalida Stage. The teams that were located in the last position of each of the tables was relegated to 2014 Torneo Federal A.

== List of champions ==
Ed.	Season	Champion/s	Also Promoted
1	1995–96	Juventud Antoniana (1)	Aldosivi; Chaco For Ever; Cipolletti; Gimnasia y Esgrima (CdU); Olimpo
2	1996–97	Almirante Brown (A) (1); San Martín (M) (1)	—
3	1997–98	Gimnasia y Esgrima (CdU) (1); Juventud Antoniana (1)	—
4	1998–99	Independiente Rivadavia (1); Racing (C) (1)	Villa Mitre
5	1999–00	General Paz Juniors (1)	—
6	2000–01	Huracán (TA) (1)	—
7	2001–02	C.A.I. (1)	—
8	2002–03	Tiro Federal (1)	—
9	2003–04	Racing (C) (2)	—
10	2004–05	Ben Hur (1)	Aldosivi
11	2005–06	Villa Mitre (1)	San Martín (T)
12	2006–07	Independiente Rivadavia (2)	—
13	2007–08	Atlético Tucumán (1)	—
14	2008–09	Boca Unidos (1)	—
15	2009–10	Patronato (1)	—
16	2010–11	Guillermo Brown (1)	Desamparados
17	2011–12	Douglas Haig (1)	Crucero del Norte
18	2012–13	Talleres (C) (1)	Sportivo Belgrano
19	2013–14	Santamarina (1)	Guaraní Antonio Franco

== Titles by club ==
Team	Titles	Years won
Juventud Antoniana	2	1995–96, 1997–98
Racing (C)	2	1998–99, 2003–04
Independiente Rivadavia	2	1998–99, 2006–07
Almirante Brown (A)	1	1996–97
San Martín (M)	1	1996–97
Gimnasia y Esgrima (CdU)	1	1997–98
General Paz Juniors	1	1999–00
Huracán (TA)	1	2000–01
CAI	1	2001–02
Tiro Federal	1	2002–03
Ben Hur	1	2004–05
Villa Mitre	1	2005–06
Atlético Tucumán	1	2007–08
Boca Unidos	1	2008–09
Patronato	1	2009–10
Guillermo Brown	1	2010–11
Douglas Haig	1	2011–12
Talleres (C)	1	2012–13
Santamarina	1	2013–14

== Seasons in Torneo Argentino A ==
Club/s	Seasons
Cipolletti, Juventud Unida Univ.	13
Gimnasia y Esgrima (CdU), Villa Mitre	12
Ben Hur, Racing (C)	11
Desamparados, Douglas Haig, General Paz Juniors, Guillermo Brown (M), Juventud Antoniana	10
Estudiantes (RC), Independiente Rivadavia, Ñuñorco, Patronato, Unión (S)	9
9 de Julio (R), CAI, Central Córdoba (SdE), Gimnasia y Tiro, Huracán (TA), Juventud Alianza, Luján de Cuyo, Rivadavia (L), Santamarina, Tiro Federal (R)	8
Alumni (VM), Central Norte, Huracán (SR), Libertad (S), Talleres (P)	7
Aldosivi, Atlético Tucumán, Cultural Argentino, Deportivo Maipú, General Belgrano	6
13 de Junio (Pirané), Alvarado, Juventud (P), La Florida, San Martín (T), Unión (MdP)	5
Dep. Barraca (Paso de los Libres), Gimnasia y Esgrima (M), Racing (O), Sportivo Belgrano, Talleres (C)	4
Almirante Brown (A), Chaco For Ever, Concepción Fútbol Club, Crucero del Norte, Defensores de Belgrano (VR), Deportivo Patagones, Ferrocarril (Concordia), Guaraní Antonio Franco, Huracán Corrientes, La Plata, Real Arroyo Seco, San Martín (M), San Martín (Monte Comán), Sportivo Patria	3
Atlético Candelaria, Boca Unidos, Germinal (Rawson), Grupo Universitario, Liniers (BB), San Jorge (T), San Martín (Formosa), Unión (SdE)	2
Andino (LR), Deportivo Roca, Estación Quequén, Estudiantes (SL), Ex Alumnos Escuela N° 185, Huracán (CR), Independiente de Villa Obrera, Juventud Unida (G), Mataderos (Necochea), Olimpo, Rosario Puerto Belgrano, Unión (Villa Krause), Villa Cubas (Catamarca)	1

- Note: 19 seasons in total, from season 1995–96 to 2013–14 inclusive.

== Top scorers ==
=== Top scorers by tournament ===
Season	Player	Team	Goals
2005-06	(Argentina) Adrián Aranda	Douglas Haig	21
2006-07	(Argentina) Gustavo Rivadeneira	Santamarina	14
2007-08	(Argentina) Claudio Sarría	Atlético Tucumán	21
2008-09	(Argentina) Cristian Núñez	Boca Unidos	21
2009-10	(Argentina) Diego Jara	Patronato	26
2010-11	(Argentina) Gonzalo Klusener	Unión (MdP)	21
2011-12	(Argentina) Juan M. Aróstegui	Sportivo Belgrano	24
2012-13	(Argentina) Gonzalo Klusener	Talleres (C)	25
2013-14	(Argentina) Fernando Zampedri	Guillermo Brown (PM)	22

Preceded by Torneo del Interior	Torneo Argentino A 1995-2014	Succeeded by Torneo Federal A
