= Independiente de Villa Obrera =

Argentine football club

Independiente de Villa Obrera is a football team from San Juan, Argentina.

Independiente used to play in the Torneo Argentino A (the third division of the Argentine football league system) although the team was relegated in 2002–03 after losing a play-off with Gimnasia y Esgrima de Mendoza.

Independiente de Oberá currently plays in the Liga Sanjuanina de fútbol.
