= Almirante Brown de Arrecifes =

Almirante Brown
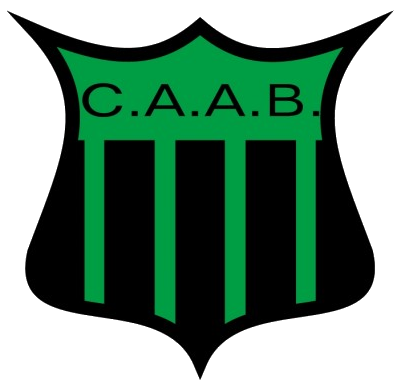
- Full name: Club Atlético Almirante Brown
- Nicknames: Toro, Verdinegro
- Founded: 14 October 1917; 108 years ago
- Ground: Estadio Municipal, Arrecifes, Buenos Aires Province
- Capacity: 5.000
- Chairman: Pablo de Zabaleta
- League: Liga de Fútbol de Arrecifes
| Home colours | Away colours |

Club Atlético Almirante Brown (mostly known as Brown de Arrecifes) is an Argentine sports club from the city of Arrecifes, in the Buenos Aires Province. Although other sports are practised there, Brown is mostly known for its football team, which currently plays in the Liga de Fútbol de Arrecifes.

== History ==
Almirante Brown, founded on 14 October 1917, by José Ryan and Stegmann. The colours of the club are related to the origins of its founders: black (taken from the German flag) and green (the Irish traditional colour).

Brown won the 1995–96 Torneo Argentino B getting promoted to the upper division. A year after, on 28 June 1997, the team reached the Primera B Nacional (the second division of the Argentine football league system) after defeating Sportivo Ben Hur 1–0 in Rafaela, Santa Fe Province. The team was coached by Rodolfo Motta.

During its debut season in the Primera B Nacional, Brown finished 6th in the first stage but then was relegated to the last position in the B group. In their second season in the Primera B Nacional (1998/99) they were coached by Gerardo Martino, who was debuting as a head coach. They played in the reduced tournament for promotion to the Argentine Primera División, but was eliminated in the round of sixteen by All Boys.

Brown made its best performance in the 2000–01 season, being near to promote to Primera División although the team was defeated by San Martín de Mendoza before reaching the semi-finals. Brown played in the second division until 2003, when the team was relegated to the Torneo Argentino A.

They then went two years without winning a single game. Not in Argentino A, nor in Argentino B. Their performance was so poor that they got relegated to Torneo Argentino C in the 2004/05 season. After this, Almirante Brown was not invited AFA to play the in next tournament. Since then, Almirante has been playing in the Arrecifes Football League, where they became champions again and won their eighteenth star in 2008.

In 2009, Brown returned to play in AFA tournaments, but this time in the 2009 Torneo del Interior, finishing third place in their zone. In 2014, they competed again in the Torneo del Interior; this time with a much better performance, losing in the semifinals on penalties against Compañía General de Salto.

After several years of falling short in the final stages of the local league, Brown was once again crowned champion in the 2014 Apertura Tournament, securing their 19th local title. They also won the 2014 Clausura Tournament under the coaching of Pedro "Palito" Galván.

== Uniform ==
| Period | Kit manufacturer | Shirt sponsor |
|---|---|---|
| 1980–1983 | (Argentina) Texport | None |
| 1984–1991 | (Argentina) Nanque | None |
| 1991–1995 | (Germany) Reusch | (Argentina) Viola Camiones |
| 1995–1997 | (Argentina) ED | (Argentina) La Primera Alborada |
| 1997–1998 | (Argentina) Taiyo | (Argentina) La Primera Alborada |
| 1998–1999 | (Germany) Reusch | (Argentina) La Primera Alborada |
| 1999–2002 | (Argentina) Envión | None |
| 2002–2004 | (Argentina) Don Balón | (Argentina) Edición On Line |
| 2004–2005 | (Argentina) Don Balón | (Argentina) Don Balón |
| 2005–2010 | (Argentina) ED | (Argentina) SFI Comunicaciones |
| 2010–2012 | (Argentina) Don Balón | (Argentina) SSP |
| 2012–2013 | (Argentina) ED | (Argentina) SFI Comunicaciones |
| 2013–2017 | (France) Sport 2000 | (Argentina) SFI Comunicaciones |
| 2018–2019 | (Argentina) Coach | (Argentina) Bouvier distribución |
| 2020– | (Argentina) Coach | (Argentina) Deli Distribuidora |

== Titles ==
=== National Tournaments ===
- Torneo Argentino A (1): 1996/97
- Torneo Argentino B (1): 1995/96

=== Regional Tournaments ===
- Liga de Fútbol de Arrecifes (20): 1942, 1944, 1951, 1953, 1972, 1973, 1977, 1978, 1982, 1984, 1992, 1993, 1994, 1995, 1996, 1997, 1998, 2007, Apertura 2014, Clausura 2014

== Club Data ==
- Seasons in the Second Division: 6
  - Primera B Nacional: 6 (1997-98, 1998-99, 1999-00, 2000-01, 2001-02, 2002-03)
- Seasons in the Third Division: 5
  - Torneo del Interior: 2 (1993-94, 1994-95)
  - Torneo Argentino A: 3 (1995-96, 1996-97, 2003-04)
- Seasons in the Fourth Division: 2
  - Torneo Argentino B: 2 (1995-96, 2004-05)
- Seasons in the Fifth Division: 3
  - Torneo del Interior: 2 (2009, 2014)
  - Torneo Federal C: 1 (2015)
- Best performance in Nacional B: 6º place in 1997/98 and 2000/2001
- Worst performance in Nacional B : 20º (last) Apertura 2002, relegated
- Best performance in Argentino A: Champion (1996/97)
- Worst performance in Argentino A: Relegated (2003/04)
- Best performance in Argentino B: Champion (1995/1996)
- Worst performance in Argentino B: Relegated (2004/05)
