= 2002–03 in Argentine football =

Football in Argentina
- Season: 2002–03

== Torneo Apertura ("Opening" Tournament) ==
Position	Team	Points	Played	Won	Drawn	Lost	For	Against	Difference
1	Independiente	43	19	13	4	2	48	19	29
2	Boca Juniors	40	19	12	4	3	32	15	17
3	River Plate	36	19	11	3	5	35	23	12
4	Chacarita	30	19	9	3	7	19	21	-2
5	Vélez Sársfield	28	19	8	4	7	23	19	4
6	Racing Club	28	19	8	4	7	28	28	0
7	Colón de Santa Fe	28	19	7	7	5	26	26	0
8	Arsenal de Sarandí	27	19	7	6	6	29	25	4
9	San Lorenzo	27	19	7	6	6	28	25	3
10	Newell's Old Boys	27	19	7	6	6	23	22	1
11	Lanús	26	19	6	8	5	21	24	-3
12	Banfield	25	19	6	7	6	21	17	4
13	Rosario Central	25	19	7	4	8	36	34	2
14	Unión de Santa Fe	23	19	6	5	8	26	28	-2
15	Talleres de Córdoba	23	19	5	8	6	23	27	-4
16	Gimnasia de La Plata	20	19	4	8	7	18	24	-6
17	Olimpo de Bahía Blanca	20	19	5	5	9	20	30	-10
18	Nueva Chicago	15	19	3	6	10	20	29	-9
19	Estudiantes La Plata	15	19	4	3	12	21	36	-15
20	Huracán	11	19	2	5	12	17	42	-25

=== Top scorers ===
Position	Player	Team	Goals
1	Andrés Silvera	Independiente	16
2	César Carignano	Colón de Santa Fe	11
3	Luciano Figueroa	Rosario Central	10
4	Marcelo Delgado	Boca Juniors	9

=== Relegation ===
There is no relegation after the Apertura. For the relegation results of this tournament see below

== Torneo Clausura ("Closing" Tournament) ==
Position	Team	Points	Played	Won	Drawn	Lost	For	Against	Difference
1	River Plate	43	19	13	4	2	43	18	25
2	Boca Juniors	39	19	12	3	4	36	23	13
3	Vélez Sársfield	38	19	12	2	5	27	12	15
4	Rosario Central	37	19	10	7	2	40	18	22
5	Colón de Santa Fe	29	19	7	8	4	19	14	5
6	San Lorenzo	29	19	8	5	6	27	28	-1
7	Estudiantes La Plata	28	19	7	7	5	24	18	6
8	Olimpo de Bahía Blanca	28	18	8	4	6	21	17	4
9	Nueva Chicago	26	19	7	5	7	29	33	-4
10	Gimnasia de La Plata	26	19	7	5	7	21	26	-5
11	Racing Club	25	19	6	7	6	26	24	2
12	Lanús	25	19	7	4	8	27	29	-2
13	Banfield	23	19	6	5	8	18	20	-2
14	Arsenal de Sarandí	22	19	4	10	5	12	13	-1
15	Newell's Old Boys	22	19	5	7	7	21	26	-5
16	Talleres de Córdoba	21	19	5	6	8	23	26	-3
17	Independiente	18	19	4	6	9	13	25	-12
18	Unión de Santa Fe	17	19	4	5	10	18	29	-11
19	Chacarita	11	19	2	5	12	11	24	-13
20	Huracán	6	18	1	3	14	12	45	-33

=== Top scorers ===
Position	Player	Team	Goals
1	Luciano Figueroa	Rosario Central	17
2	Roberto Nanni	Vélez Sársfield	15
3	Fernando Cavenaghi	River Plate	12
4	Cristian Castillo	Olimpo de Bahía Blanca	11

=== Relegation ===
Team	Average	Points	Played	2000-01	2001-02	2002-03
River Plate	2.114	241	114	78	84	79
Boca Juniors	1.912	218	114	71	68	79
San Lorenzo	1.702	194	114	81	57	56
Vélez Sársfield	1.491	170	114	56	48	66
Gimnasia de La Plata	1.447	165	114	55	64	46
Racing Club	1.439	164	114	40	71	53
Colón de Santa Fe	1.421	162	114	49	56	57
Estudiantes La Plata	1.342	153	114	56	54	43
Newell's Old Boys	1.298	148	114	48	51	49
Olimpo de Bahía Blanca	1.289	49	38	N/A	N/A	49
Arsenal de Sarandí	1.289	49	38	N/A	N/A	49
Lanús	1.272	145	114	43	51	51
Independiente	1.263	144	114	42	41	61
Banfield	1.263	96	76	N/A	48	48
Chacarita	1.263	144	114	56	47	41
Rosario Central	1.254	143	114	41	40	62
Talleres de Córdoba	1.184	135	114	61	30	44
Nueva Chicago	1.171	89	76	N/A	48	41
Unión de Santa Fe	1.096	125	114	46	39	40
Huracán	1.026	117	114	55	44	18

==== "Promoción" Playoff ====
Date	Home	Away	Result
July 9, 2003	San Martín de Mendoza	Talleres de Córdoba	0-1
July 13, 2004	Talleres de Córdoba	San Martín de Mendoza	1-0

Talleres de Córdoba wins 2-0 and stays in Argentine First Division. San Martín de Mendoza remains in Argentine Nacional B.

Date	Home	Away	Result
July 9, 2004	Argentinos Juniors	Nueva Chicago	0-1
July 13, 2004	Nueva Chicago	Argentinos Juniors	2-0

Nueva Chicago wins 3-0 and stays in Argentine First Division. Argentinos Juniors remains in Argentine Nacional B.

== Argentine clubs in international competitions ==
Team	Recopa	Copa Sudamericana 2002	2003 Copa Libertadores
Boca Juniors	N/A	Round 1	Champions
San Lorenzo	Runner up	Champions	did not qualify
River Plate	N/A	Round 1	QF
Racing Club	N/A	QF	Round 2
Gimnasia de La Plata	N/A	QF	Group stage

== Lower Leagues ==
Level	Tournament	Champion
2nd	Primera B Nacional Apertura; Primera B Nacional Clausura	Atlético Rafaela; Atlético Rafaela
3rd	Primera B Metropolitana	Ferro Carril Oeste
3rd (Interior)	Torneo Argentino A	Tiro Federal
4th	Primera C Metropolitana	Colegiales
5th	Primera D Metropolitana	Sacachispas

== National team ==
This section covers Argentina's matches from August 1, 2002, to July 31, 2003.

Win Draw Loss

=== Friendly matches ===
November 20, 2002	Japan	0 – 2	Argentina	Saitama, Japan
		(Report)	Sorín 47'; Crespo 49'	Stadium: Saitama Stadium; Attendance: 40,931

January 31, 2003	Honduras	1 – 3	Argentina	San Pedro Sula, Honduras
	Martínez 7'	(Report)	D. Milito 15'; Lucho 53'; M. González 56'	Stadium: Estadio Olímpico Metropolitano; Attendance: 20,000

February 4, 2003	Mexico	0 – 1	Argentina	Los Angeles, United States
		(Report)	G. Rodríguez 14'	Stadium: Memorial Coliseum

February 8, 2003	United States	0 – 1	Argentina	Miami, United States
		(Report)	Lucho 9'	Stadium: Orange Bowl; Attendance: 27,196

February 12, 2003	Netherlands	1 – 0	Argentina	Amsterdam, Netherlands
18:30 UTC+01	van Bronckhorst 87'	(Report)		Stadium: Amsterdam Arena; Attendance: 40,090; Referee: Kim Nielsen (Denmark)

April 30, 2003	Libya	1 – 3	Argentina	Tripoli, Libya
20:45 UTC+02	Taib 60'	(Report)	Saviola 23'; Riquelme 63'; Aimar 87'	Stadium: June 11 Stadium; Attendance: 25,000

June 8, 2003	Japan	1 – 4	Argentina	Osaka, Japan
18:20 UTC+09	Akita 55'	(Report)	Saviola 30'; Zanetti 45'; Romeo 78'; M. Rodríguez 82'	Stadium: Nagai Stadium; Attendance: 42,508

June 11, 2003	South Korea	0 – 1	Argentina	Seoul, Korea Republic
UTC+09		(Report)	Saviola 44'	Stadium: Seoul World Cup Stadium

July 16, 2003	Argentina	2 – 2	Uruguay	La Plata, Argentina
	D. Milito 4', 9'	(Report)	Chevantón 7'; G. Milito 37' (o.g.)	Stadium: Estadio Ciudad de La Plata; Attendance: 40,000
