= Estadio San Martín =

Football stadium in San Martín de Mendoza, Argentina

- Interactive map of Estadio San Martín
- Full name: Estadio Libertador General San Martín
- Location: San Martín, Mendoza, Argentina
- Capacity: 12,000
- Surface: grass
- Field size: 70 x 100 m

Construction
- Opened: April 1, 1956

Estadio Libertador General San Martín is the football (soccer) venue of the Atlético Club San Martín of the Mendoza Province in Argentina.

Inaugurated on April 1, 1956, it accommodates 12,000 spectators. Its field measures 70m x 100m.

The stadium holds a parking lot, a laundry, a kitchen, restaurant, conference room and sanitary services.
