= Monte Comán =

Coordinates: 34°36′S 67°54′W

Monte Coman is a town and district in San Rafael Department, Mendoza Province, Argentina, located to the east of San Rafael city. The town has a football team called San Martín.
