= Concepción Fútbol Club =

Argentine football club

Concepción
- Full name: Concepción Fútbol Club
- Nickname(s): Cuervo del Sur
- Founded: 20 January 1927; 98 years ago
- Ground: Stewart Shipton, Concepción, Tucumán, Argentina
- Capacity: 12,550
- League: Torneo Argentino B
- 2010–11: 2nd of Zona 7
- Website: concepcion-fc.com.ar (archived)
| Home colours | Away colours |

Concepción Fútbol Club is an Argentine football, club based in the city of Concepción, Tucumán. The team currently plays in the Torneo Argentino B, the regionalised 4th division of the Argentine football league system.

== Titles ==
- Liga Tucumana del Sur (19)
- Liga Tucumana de Fútbol (4): 1988, 1992, 1994 y 1995
