= Liniers de Bahía Blanca =

Argentine football club

Club Atlético Liniers
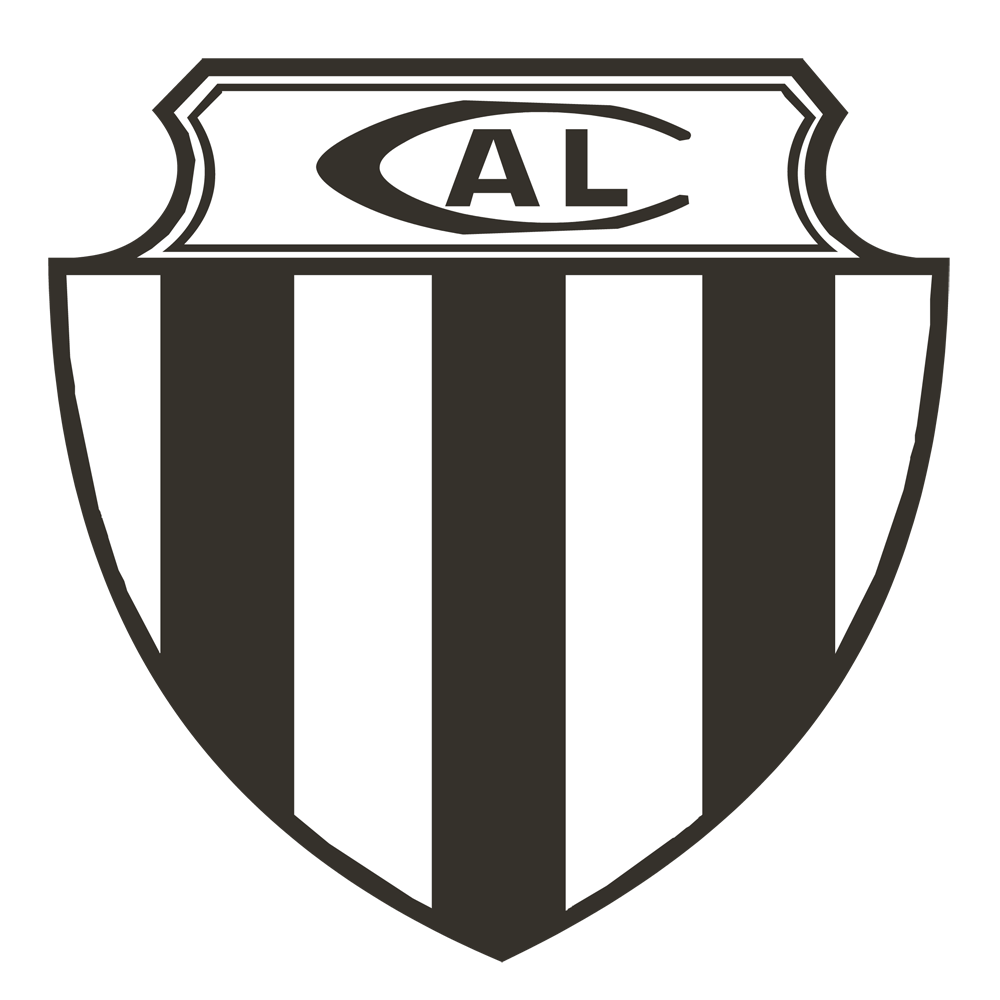
- Full name: Club Atlético Liniers de Bahía Blanca
- Nickname: El Chivo
- Founded: October 8, 1908
- Ground: Alejandro Pérez
- Capacity: 250
- League: Torneo Argentino B
- 2007–08: 3rd Zone E (Eliminated in 2nd round)
Home colours	Away colours

Club Atlético Liniers, also known as Liniers de Bahía Blanca, is an Argentine football club, located in Bahía Blanca, in the Province of Buenos Aires. The team currently plays in Zone E of the regionalised 4th level of Argentine football Torneo Argentino B.

== See also ==
- List of football clubs in Argentina
- Argentine football league system
