= Huracán de Tres Arroyos =

Argentine football club

- Full name: Club Atlético Huracán de Tres Arroyos
- Nicknames: El Globito (The Little Balloon); Los Peludos (The Hairys)
- Founded: 3 January 1923; 103 years ago
- Ground: Estadio Roberto Lorenzo Bottino
- Capacity: 10,000
- Chairman: Mariano Pérez
- Manager: Leonardo Gómez
- League: Torneo Federal C
- 2015: 1° (in group 10) (eliminated)
Home colours	Away colours

Club Atlético Huracán, commonly known as Huracán de Tres Arroyos, is an Argentine football club based in the city of Tres Arroyos, in Buenos Aires Province.

The club is the biggest of Tres Arroyos City, and one of the largest in Southern Buenos Aires Province

The club were founded 3 January 1923 and plays in the Torneo Federal C which is the fifth division of the Argentine league.

They played in the first division during the 2004–2005 season. For 2007/2008, the club had to play in the Argentino A because they got relegated during the previous season.

== Current squad ==
Note: Flags indicate national team as defined under FIFA eligibility rules; some limited exceptions apply. Players may hold more than one non-FIFA nationality.

No.	Pos.	Nation	Player

== Titles ==
- Torneo Argentino A: 1

2000-01

== See also ==
- List of football clubs in Argentina
- Argentine football league system
