= Luján de Cuyo =

- City
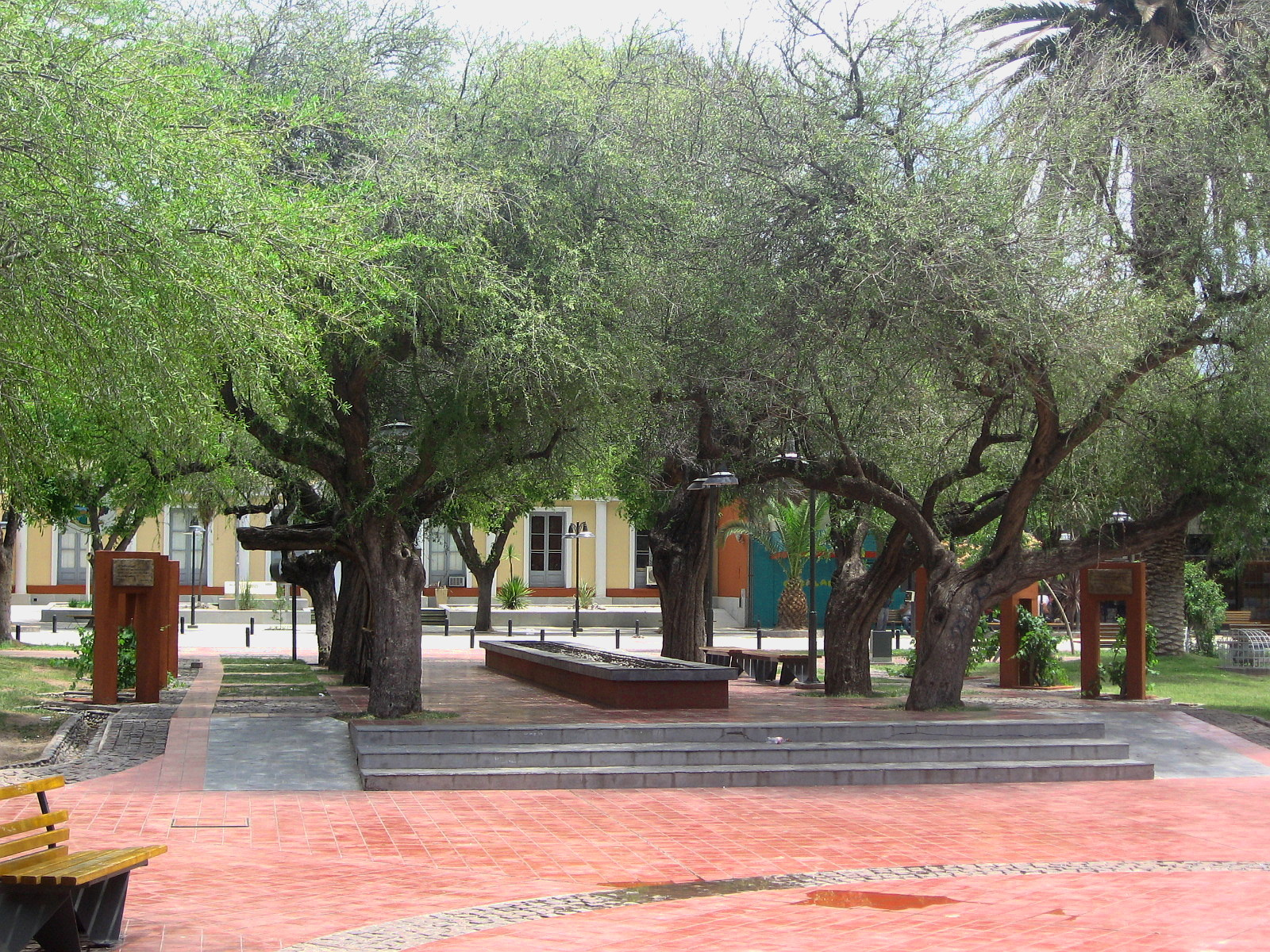

- Location of Luján de Cuyo in Argentina
- Coordinates: 32.998°S 68.873°W
- Country: Argentina
- Province: Mendoza
- Department: Luján de Cuyo

Population (2001 census)
  - Total: 73,058
- Time zone: UTC−3 (ART)
- CPA base: M5517
- Dialing code: +54 02614
- Climate: BWk
- Website: Luján de Cuyo (in Spanish)

Luján de Cuyo is the affluent district capital of the Luján de Cuyo Department located in the west of the Mendoza Province of Argentina. It forms part of the Greater Mendoza metropolitan area.

== Wine ==
It was the first delineated appellation for the purposes of wine production, recognised by the International Organisation of Vine and Wine in 1993.

Situated in the upper Mendoza valley, where the river is half-way through its journey from the Andes mountains to the eastern plains, many Lujan de Cuyo vineyards sit at altitudes of around 1000 m (3280 ft). Malbec in particular is successful in Lujan de Cuyo, but the appellation also produces good Cabernet Sauvignon, Chardonnay and Torrontes. The majority of the vineyards are on alluvial soils; sandy or stony surfaces on clay substrata.

== Sport ==
Asociación Atlético Luján de Cuyo are a football club that currently play in the regionalised Argentine 3rd division

== Notable people ==
- Leonardo Favio, singer, actor, film director and screenwriter.
- Victoria Torni, de facto First Lady of Argentina between 1944 and 1946. She died in Luján de Cuyo.

== See also ==
- Mendoza wine
