= Talleres de Perico =

Argentine sports club

- Full name: Club Atlético Talleres
- Nickname: Expreso
- Founded: 4 April 1944; 82 years ago
- Ground: Estadio Dr Plinio Zabala, Perico, Jujuy Province, Argentina
- Capacity: 6,000
- League: Torneo Argentino A
- 2010–11: 4th of Zona 8 (eliminated on first stage)
- Website: http://atleticotalleres.com.ar/
Home colours	Away colours

Club Atlético Talleres (sometimes specified Talleres de Perico) is a sports club from Perico, in Jujuy Province, Argentina. Mostly known for its football team, Talleres plays in Torneo Argentino B, which is the regionalised fourth tier of the Argentine Football Association league system.

== History ==
Talleres originated from an earlier club named Club Atlético Estación Perico, founded in 1932. The first news about a sporting institution dedicated to soccer practice in Perico Station came on August 26, 1932, when the provincial legislature passed a law requiring by a donation of $200 national currency for Club Atlético Perico Station. The law was countersigned by the president of the HCD, and R. Pérez Bidondo Alisedo (secretary). In1942, there was a club in the village called Perico Racing Club, run by Mr. Leandro Vaca, a barber, and in collaboration with Don Filomeno Cáceres, an employee of the plant belonging to the Flia Lamas. After a year, the two friends parted ways, and Don Filomeno Cáceres founded a summer club called Club Workshops, which is the name chosen for having made for the first time in a garage owned by Don Napoleon of Moral (Cañemo store). Located on Calle San Martin, The Tucumana business started working on the possibility of making this summer club an institution with applicable statutes.

== Stadium ==
- The stadium of Club Atlético Talleres is called Doctor Plinio Zabala is located in Ciudad Perico, has a capacity of 5000 people.
- This is also a basketball stadium inaugurated on April 14, 2011 with a capacity of over 2000 people. The stadium was built by the government of Jujuy for 77th Argentine Championship of Basketball which will host as a subsidiary a total of 15 matches of the group stage.
- In 2012 he first played under floodlights at the stadium, the reflectors were assigned by the Board of the Club Gimnasia de Jujuy.
- The stadium got a full house in 2007 against Anthony Youth jumps where 6,000 people attended.
- While workshops took more public was not in the stadium, it was at the stage of the capital of Jujuy "23 August" against Atletico Tucuman where 18,000 people being 7,000 supporters express and 11,000 deans in a clash for the final round of the tournament attended Argentino "a" edition 2007/2008 workshops in which I remain removed versus tucumano team.
