= Concepción, Tucumán =

Concepción
- City
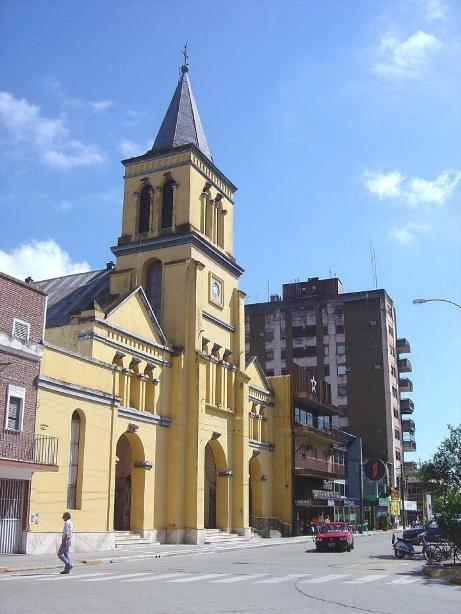
- Concepción (Tucumán): The City's Cathedral across from Mitre Square

- Location of Concepción in Argentina
- Coordinates: 27°20′S 65°35′W
- Country: Argentina
- Province: Tucumán
- Department: Chicligasta

Government
  - Intendant: Alejandro Molinuevo (UCR)

Population (2010 census)
  - Total: 49,782
- Demonym: concepcionense
- Time zone: UTC−3 (ART)
- CPA base: T4146
- Dialing code: +54 3865

Concepción is a city and the department seat of Chicligasta in Tucumán Province, Argentina. It is located 76 km south of the provincial capital and largest city San Miguel de Tucumán and has a population of 49,782 (2010 census [INDEC]). Due to its population and bustling commercial activity, the city is considered to be the second most important urban area in the province (the first one being the Greater San Miguel de Tucumán region), and the main one in southern Tucumán.

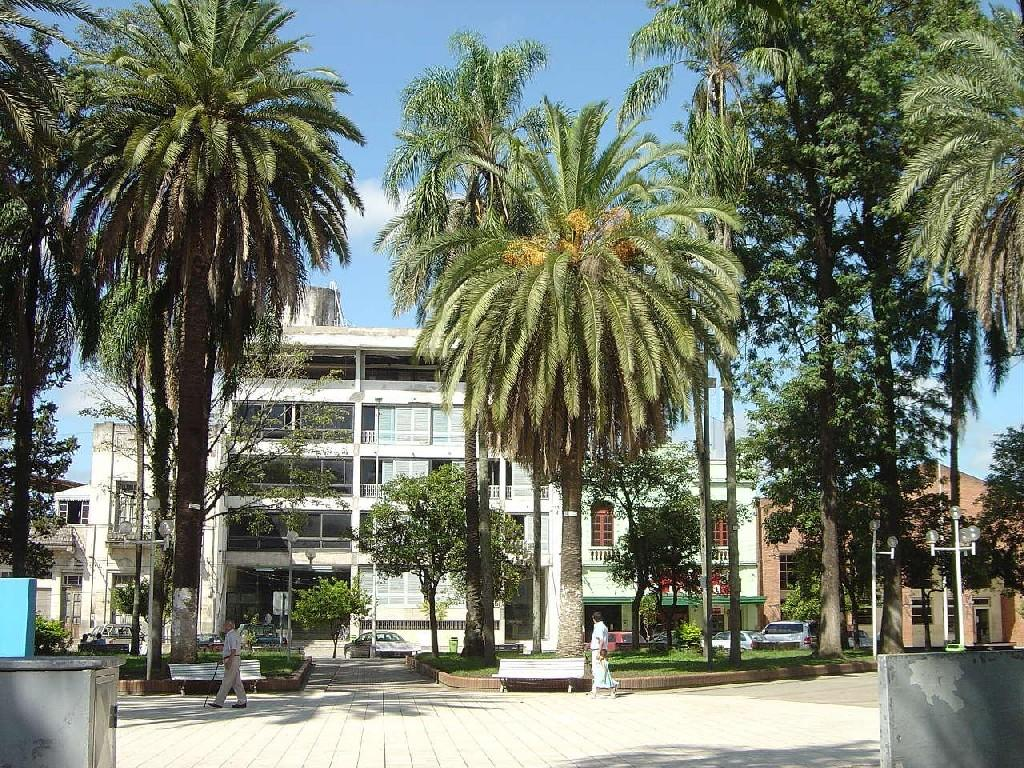
Bartolomé Mitre Square.

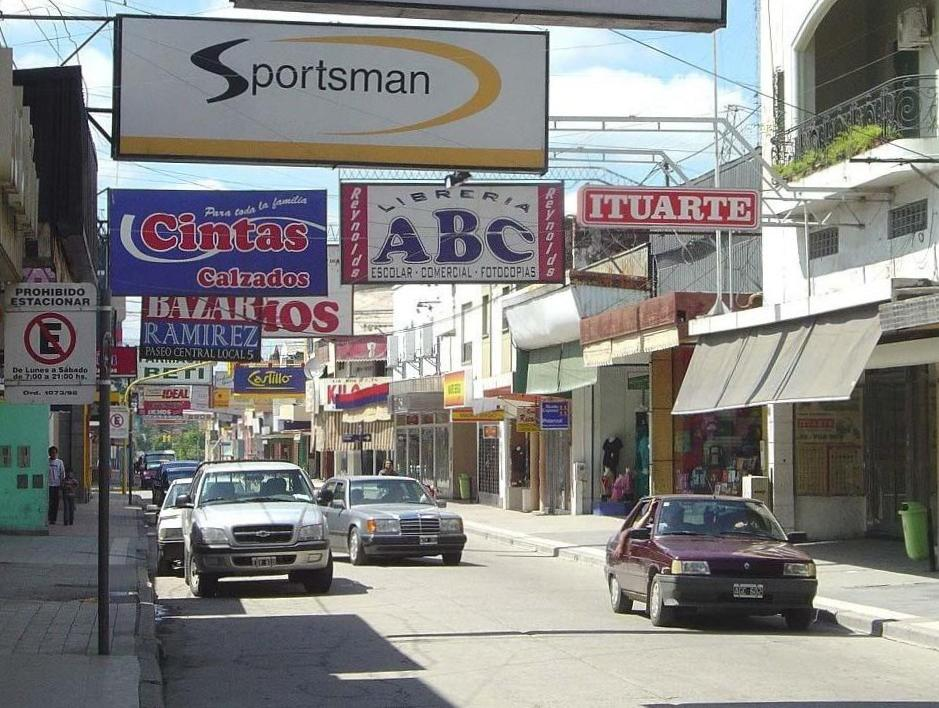
Commercial district.

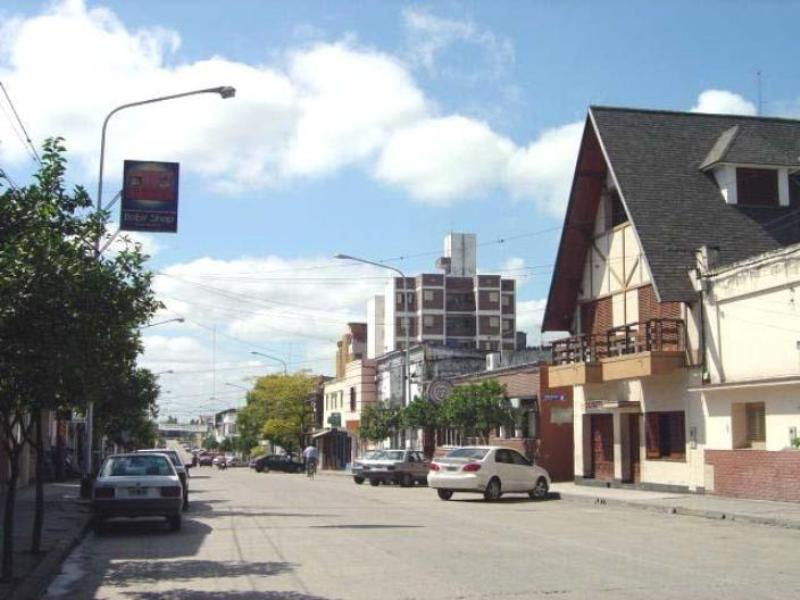
24 de Septiembre Street.

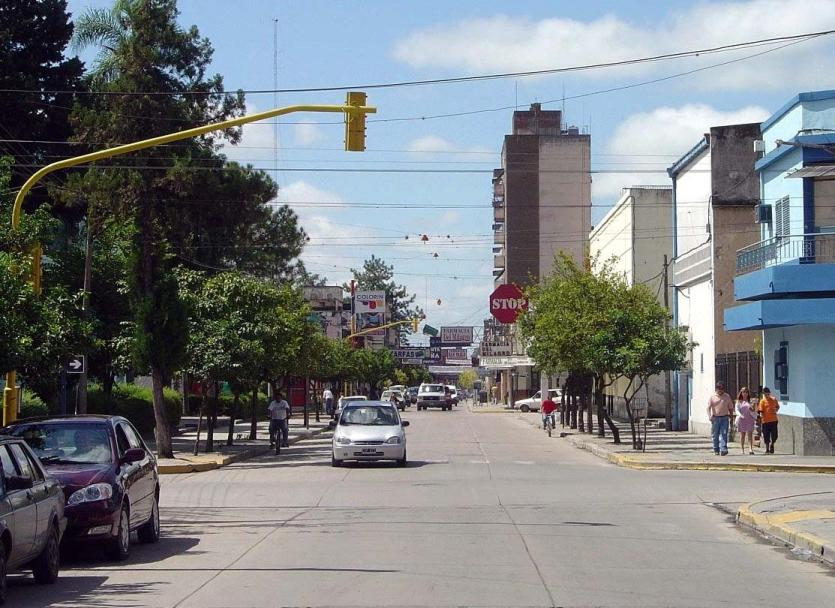
San Martín Avenue.

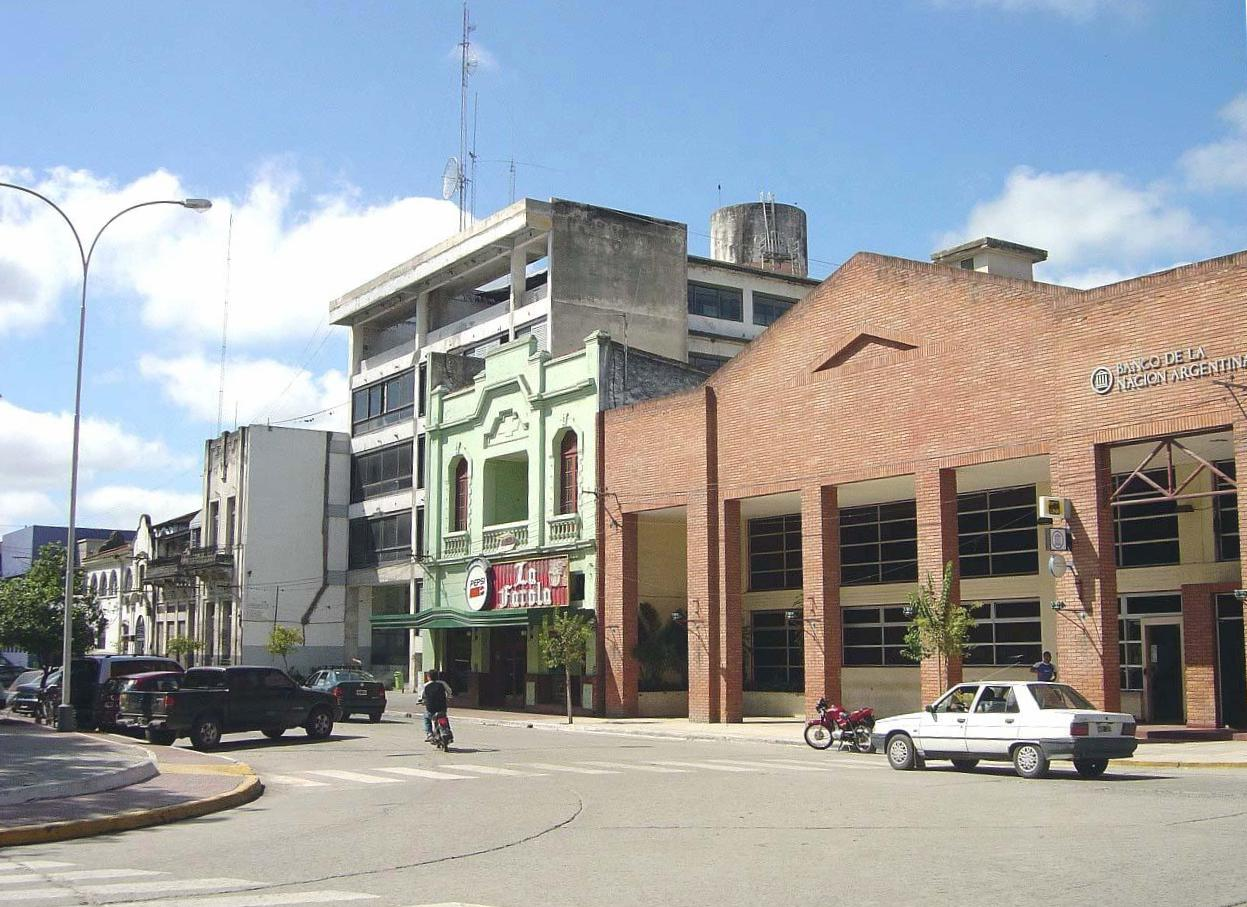
Courthouse (left) and local branch of the Banco Nación.
