= Asociación Atlética Luján de Cuyo =

Argentine football club

Luján de Cuyo
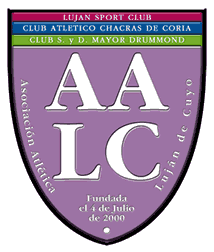
- Full name: Asociación Atlética Luján de Cuyo
- Nicknames: Los Violetas, Los del Bajo
- Founded: 4 July 2000
- Dissolved: 1 December 2010; 15 years ago
- Ground: Estadio Jardín Del Bajo, Mendoza; Mendoza Province, Argentina
- Capacity: 1,000
- Manager: Jorge Julio
- League: Torneo Argentino A
- 2007–08: 7th Group A (Lost playoff, relegated to Argentino B)
Home colours	Away colours

Asociación Atlética Luján de Cuyo (or simply Luján de Cuyo) was an association football club based in Luján de Cuyo, a city of Mendoza Province, Argentina, established in 2000 and dissolved in 2010. The team took part in the Argentino A and Argentino B tournaments organized by the Argentine Football Association.

The team played its home games at the Estadio Jardín del Bajo with a capacity of 8,000 spectators.

== History ==
The club was founded on July 1, 2000, becoming one of the youngest teams in the Argentine football league system. Luján de Cuyo was formed by a merger of 3 smaller clubs; Chacras de Coria, Luján Sport Club and Mayor Drummond.

The team had begun life playing in a violet strip adopted from the fusion with Chacras de Coria, giving it the nickname Los Violetas.

Luján de Cuyo has had a quick rise to fame in the early half of the 2000s, after obtaining an invite to the Torneo del Interior, and placing well enough then, to qualify to the Torneo Argentino B. However, after obtaining yet another promotion to the Torneo Argentino A in 2006, by 2007 the team were in dire financial circumstances. By 2009, the entire roster had either quit or refused to play for the club until their wages were paid resulting in at least 4 forfeit matches over 3 seasons.

In 2007, one of the representatives of Chacras de Coria, Mr. Savina, showed his intention of splitting away from the society. Some versions stated that Chacras de Coria was about to merge to club Huracán Las Heras although it was not finally carried out. At the end of 2007 the club entered into a severe economic crisis after Eduardo Bauzá (the creator and manager of the organization) left the club. As a result, the coach and players of the football team quit due to the lack of funds to pay their salaries.

By the end of 2010 the club had been relegated two consecutive times and only played in the Liga Mendocina de Fútbol, the regional league of the Mendoza Province. The society dissolved definitely that same year, being Luján Sport Club and Chacras de Coria the only clubs surviving. Club Mayor Drummond, the third part of the society, was definitely dissolved.
