= General Belgrano de Santa Rosa =

Argentine football club

Club General Belgrano
- Full name: Club General Belgrano de Santa Rosa
- Nickname: Tricolores
- Founded: 1919
- Ground: Estadio Villa Alonso; Av. Belgrano Norte 730; Villa Alonso; Santa Rosa, La Pampa; Argentina
- Capacity: 15,000
- League: Liga Cultural de Fútbol de La Pampa
Home colours

Club General Belgrano de Santa Rosa is a football team from Santa Rosa, La Pampa, Argentina.

== Background ==
Club Defensores de Belgrano was founded on 28 April 1919 in Santa Rosa, the capital of the La Pampa Province. The club name was later shortened to Club General Belgrano and the nickname of Tricolores was adopted reflecting the three colours of black, red and white on the club shirt.

The team's original league was the Liga Cultural de Fútbol de La Pampa. From 1995/96 to 2000/01 the club spent 6 seasons in the Torneo Argentino A.

The club is located in Av. Belgrano Norte 730 in the neighborhood Villa Alonso. There is a sports/leisure hall, a buffet, a swimming pool, a stadium (known as Nuevo Rancho Grande) with a capacity of around 12,000 people, training facilities and a BMX track.

The club has won 9 local championships of the Liga Cultural making it the third most successful club in the province behind local neighbours Club Atlético All Boys (33 championships) and Atlético Santa Rosa (10 championships).

== Honours ==
- Liga Cultural de Fútbol de La Pampa Champions: 1930, 1932, 1952, 1978, 1997, 1998, 2002, 2008 and 2009 (9 occasions).
