= Huracán de San Rafael =

Argentine football club

Club Atlético Huracán (usually simply Huracán) is a football team from San Rafael, Mendoza, Argentina. It used to play in the Torneo Argentino A (3rd level interior) although it was relegated in 2001–02. In 2008–09 it played in the Torneo Argentino C (5th level interior).

== See also ==
- Argentine football league system
