= Estadio Presbítero Bartolomé Grella =

Football stadium in Paraná, Argentina

Presbyter Bartolomé Grella Stadium
- Estadio Presbítero Bartolomé Grella
- Interactive map of Presbyter Bartolomé Grella Stadium
- Former names: Estadio Villa Sarmiento
- Address: Padre Bartolomé Grella 874; Paraná; Argentina
- Owner: C.A. Patronato
- Capacity: 22,000
- Type: Stadium
- Surface: Grass
- Field size: 105 x 68 m

Construction
- Opened: 30 May 1956; 70 years ago
- Renovated: 2010, 2023
- Expanded: 1978, 1999

Tenant
- C.A. Patronato (1956–present)

Estadio Presbítero Bartolomé Grella is a football stadium located in the city of Paraná in Entre Ríos Province, Argentina. Originally named "Estadio Villa Sarmiento", it is owned and operated by Club Atlético Patronato, having been opened in 1956. The stadium has capacity for 22,000 spectators.

The stadium was named after Presbyter Bartolomé Grella (Turin, Italy, 1879 – Paraná, 1960), founder of C.A. Patronato. Grella had arrived in Paraná in 1914 to teach at the local seminary. That same year he bought a vacant land where his students could play football. Like French patronages –Christian centres with cultural and sports activities– he named the entity "Patronato de la Juventud Católica" (Patronage of the Catholic Youth). In 1931 he bought a land where the "Santa Teresita" chapel and two football pitches would be built. Apart from religion, his main interest was to promote sports in children.

== History ==
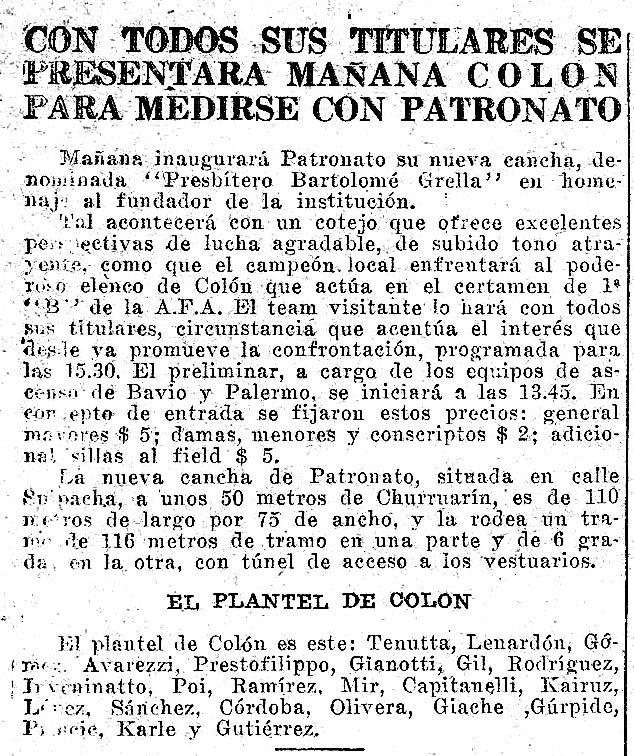
Chronicle of the first match held in the stadium, Patronato v Colón (Santa Fe), 1956

The venue was inaugurated on 30 May 1956 in a friendly match between Patronato and Santa Fe's club Colón (won by the visitor team 3–1). The old concrete grandstand was inaugurated in a match vs Boca Juniors in 1968. It had capacity for 2,500 people.

When Patronato participated in the 1978 Torneo Nacional, the stadium expanded its capacity with the construction of a stand on Presbítero Grella (then 'Suipacha', capacity of 3,000), another stand for 1,500 people, and the stalls (1,500).

Due to the stadium hold the Latin America Missionary Congress (COMLA) in 1999, attended by over 20,000 missionary people the old stand on San Nicolás street was demolished, being replaced with another one with capacity for 15,000 people. That increased the stadium capacity to 22,000 people. Works were costed by the religious entity.

When Patronato promoted to Primera B Nacional in 2010, the club decided to refurbish the stadium to fit the AFA requirements. Works included sowing on the field, grandstand painting, construction of new press booths and an anti-doping control room, plus the remodelattion of locker rooms, among other improvements.

The stadium had to be refurbished once more in 2023, prior to Patronato's debut in the 2023 Copa Libertadores in order to fit Conmebol requirements for its competitions. Remodellations included the installation of new lighting devices, grass sowing, and an irrigation system.
