= Juventud Alianza =

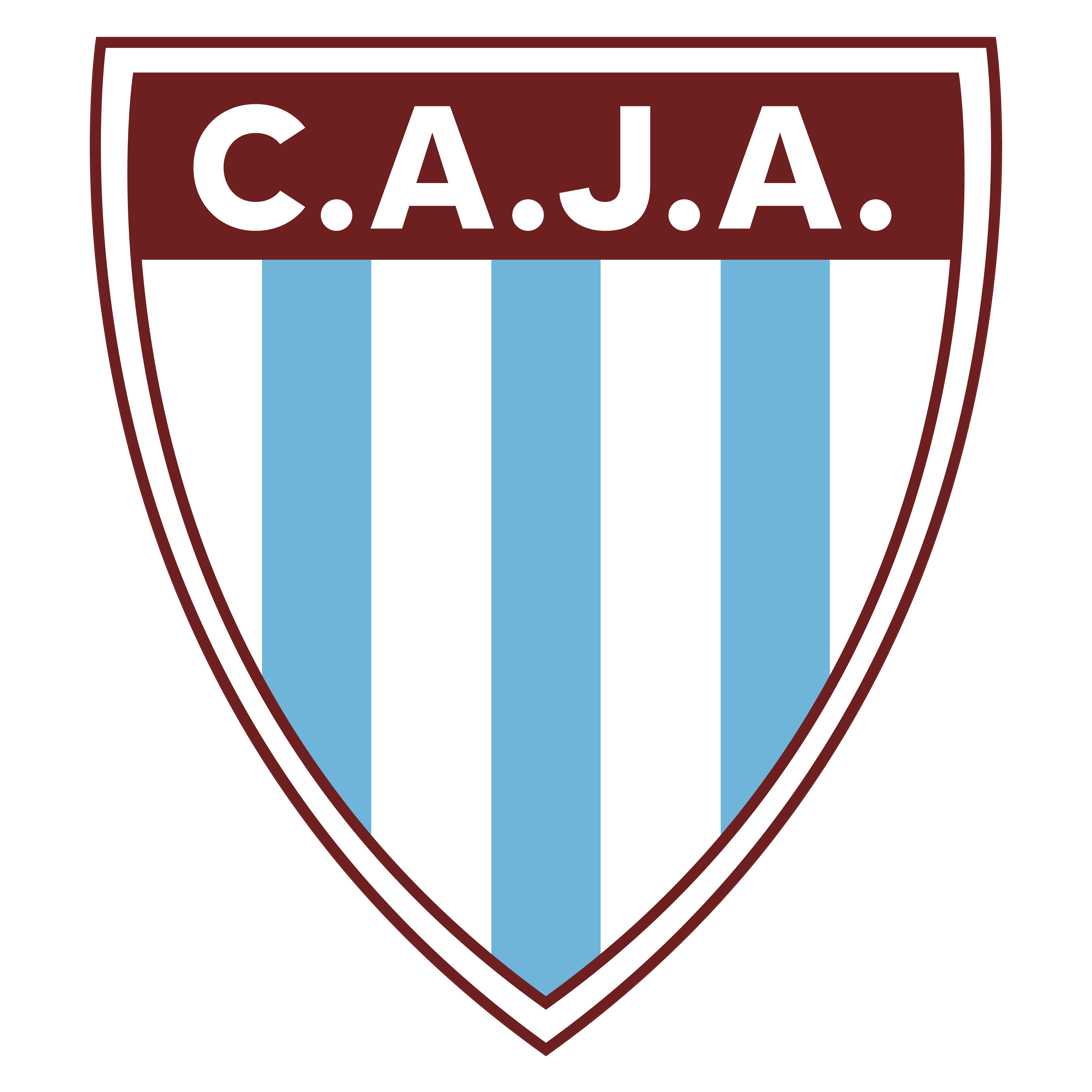
- Full name: Club Atlético de la Juventud Alianza
- Nicknames: El Lechuzo; Decano de Cuyo; Los Inadaptados
- Founded: November 1, 1973
- Ground: Estadio Bosque del Bajo Grande, Santa Lucía, San Juan, Argentina
- Capacity: 15,000
- Chairman: Gustavo Soria
- Manager: Maximiliano Pascual
- League: Torneo Argentino B
- 2010–11: 18th
- Website: http://www.gloriosolechuzo.com.ar/
Home colours	Away colours

Club Atlético de la Juventud Alianza (usually called Juventud Alianza) is a sports club based in the city of Santa Lucía, San Juan, Argentina. Although other sports are practised at the club, Juventud Alianza is mostly known for its football team, which currently plays in the Torneo Regional Federal Amateur, the regionalised 4th division of the Argentine football league system. Juventud Alianza was originally formed in 1905 under the name Atletico Juventud. The club changed to its current name in the 1970s.

== Honours ==
=== Regional ===
- Liga Sanjuanina de Fútbol
  - Winners (24): (Atlético de la Juventud) 1922, 1923, 1925, 1929, 1934, 1935, 1936, 1945, 1946, 1950, 1952, 1953, 1961
  - (Atlético de la Juventud Alianza) 1974, 1981, 1982, 1984, 1985, 1986, 1987, 1988, 2010, 2016 (A), 2021

== See also ==
- List of football clubs in Argentina
- Argentine football league system
