= General Paz Juniors =

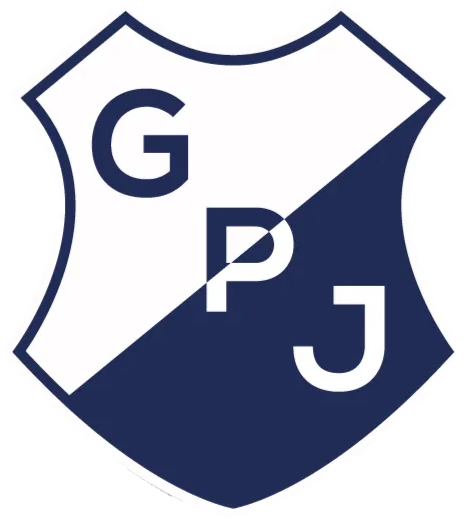
- Full name: Club Atlético General Paz Juniors
- Nickname: Albo
- Founded: 27 April 1914; 111 years ago
- Ground: Estadio Carlos Lacasia, Córdoba, Argentina
- Capacity: 11,000
- League: Torneo Argentino B
- 28th
- Website: https://www.generalpazjuniors.com.ar/
Home colours	Away colours

Club Atlético General Paz Juniors is a sports club located in Córdoba, Argentina. The club is mostly known for its football team, which played in the regionalised Torneo Argentino A, having also achieving a title in 1999–2000. Other sports practised at the club are basketball, field hockey, handball, swimming, tennis, volleyball, artistic roller skating, and martial arts.

== History ==
The club was established by a group of young men from the town of "General Paz" that came from Córdoba Athletic Club (another club of Córdoba that had left the practise of football due to the lack of gentleman's manner of their rivals). On 27 April 1914 they founded "General Paz Junior's" with the main purpose of reestablishing the practise of football. Guillermo Astrada was appointed as president of the institution. The club registered to the Córdoba Football Federation, debuting only two weeks later vs. C.A. Argentino Peñarol. People that attended the match, held in the old C.A. Belgrano stadium, saw General Paz to win 3–2.

On October 25, Junior's inaugurated their field in Bajo de los Perros (a former Córdoba Athletic facility) although the club moved to other field soon later. Junior's remained there until 1942 when they moved to their current headquarters.

In 1943, General Paz Juniors reached the final of the Copa General Pedro Ramírez (also called "Campeonato de la República"), the first Argentine competition contested by clubs from Primera División and regional leagues. During that tournament, Juniors eliminated Sarmiento de Córdoba, Nacional (VSP), Newell's Old Boys, and San Martín (T), but lost to San Lorenzo 8–3 in the final held in Buenos Aires.

== Titles ==
=== National ===
- Torneo Argentino A (1): 1999–2000

=== Regional ===
- Liga Cordobesa de Fútbol:
  - First Division (9): 1943, 1964, 1989, 1991, 1995, 1997, 2003, 2021, 2022
  - Second Division (4): 1926, 1952, 1976, 2014
