= 2006–07 Primera B Nacional =

21st season of the second-tier football league in Argentina

Primera B Nacional
- Season: 2006–07
- Champions: Olimpo (2nd divisional title)
- Promoted: Olimpo; San Martín (SJ); Huracán; Tigre
- Relegated: Huracán (TA); Villa Mitre
- Matches played: 380
- Goals scored: 892 (2.35 per match)
- Top goalscorer: AP: Ismael Blanco 18 goals CL: Ismael Blanco 11 goals

The 2006–07 Argentine Primera B Nacional was the 21st season of second division professional of football in Argentina. A total of 20 teams competed; the champion and runner-up were promoted to Argentine Primera División.

== Club information ==
Club	City	Stadium
Aldosivi	Mar del Plata	José María Minella
Almagro	José Ingenieros	Tres de Febrero
Atlético de Rafaela	Rafaela	Nuevo Monumental
Ben Hur	Rafaela	Parque Barrio Ilolay
CAI	Comodoro Rivadavia	Municipal de Comodoro Rivadavia
Chacarita Juniors	Villa Maipú	Chacarita Juniors
Defensa y Justicia	Florencio Varela	Norberto "Tito" Tomaghello
Ferro Carril Oeste	Caballito	Arq. Ricardo Etcheverry
Huracán	Parque Patricios	Tomás Adolfo Ducó
Huracán	Tres Arroyos	Roberto Lorenzo Bottino
Instituto	Córdoba	Presidente Perón
Olimpo	Bahía Blanca	Roberto Natalio Carminatti
Platense	Florida	Ciudad de Vicente López
San Martín	San Juan	Ing. Hilario Sánchez
San Martín	San Miguel de Tucumán	La Ciudadela
Talleres	Córdoba	Estadio La Boutique
Tigre	Victoria	José Dellagiovanna
Tiro Federal	Rosario	Fortín de Ludueña
Unión	Santa Fe	15 de Abril
Villa Mitre	Bahía Blanca	El Fortín

== Torneo Apertura standings ==
Pos	Team	Pld	W	D	L	GF	GA	GD	Pts	Qualification
1	Olimpo	19	12	4	3	36	17	+19	40	Promotion Playoff
2	Platense	19	11	5	3	31	14	+17	38	
3	Tigre	19	10	5	4	23	17	+6	35	
4	San Martín (SJ)	19	9	7	3	25	18	+7	34	
5	Chacarita Juniors	19	8	9	2	22	14	+8	33	
6	Huracán	19	9	6	4	29	26	+3	33	
7	Atlético de Rafaela	19	9	5	5	24	14	+10	32	
8	Unión	19	8	4	7	28	17	+11	28	
9	San Martín (T)	19	6	7	6	21	20	+1	25	
10	Aldosivi	19	6	6	7	25	32	−7	24	
11	CAI	19	6	5	8	26	27	−1	23	
12	Ferro Carril Oeste	19	6	5	8	19	23	−4	23	
13	Instituto	19	5	5	9	22	29	−7	20	
14	Talleres (C)	19	4	7	8	19	23	−4	19	
15	Tiro Federal	19	4	7	8	23	28	−5	19	
16	Defensa y Justicia	19	4	7	8	11	19	−8	19	
17	Almagro	19	4	7	8	18	31	−13	19	
18	Villa Mitre	19	3	8	8	22	27	−5	17	
19	Huracán (TA)	19	3	7	9	17	33	−16	16	
20	Ben Hur	19	3	4	12	22	34	−12	13	

== Torneo Clausura standings ==
Pos	Team	Pld	W	D	L	GF	GA	GD	Pts	Qualification
1	Olimpo	19	11	5	3	29	14	+15	38	Promotion Playoff (Champion) (Note: As Olimpo won both, Apertura and Clausura titles, it was crowned champion.)
2	Defensa y Justicia	19	11	5	3	28	16	+12	38	
3	Huracán	19	10	6	3	33	20	+13	36	
4	Atlético de Rafaela	19	10	6	3	27	17	+10	36	
5	San Martín (SJ)	19	9	8	2	26	12	+14	35	
6	Tigre	19	8	8	3	25	15	+10	32	
7	Almagro	19	8	6	5	26	24	+2	30	
8	Unión	19	7	8	4	17	16	+1	29	
9	Chacarita Juniors	19	8	4	7	21	16	+5	28	
10	Platense	19	7	2	10	19	25	−6	23	
11	Instituto	19	7	2	10	16	23	−7	23	
12	Ben Hur	19	7	2	10	19	28	−9	23	
13	CAI	19	5	7	7	17	16	+1	22	
14	Huracán (TA)	19	6	4	9	19	23	−4	22	
15	Aldosivi	19	6	3	10	19	25	−6	21	
16	Tiro Federal	19	4	8	7	12	15	−3	20	
17	San Martín (T)	19	4	7	8	17	29	−12	19	
18	Ferro Carril Oeste	19	3	7	9	8	18	−10	16	
19	Villa Mitre	19	4	4	11	18	30	−12	16	
20	Talleres (C)	19	1	6	12	15	29	−14	9	

== Overall standings ==
Pos	Team	Pld	W	D	L	GF	GA	GD	Pts	Promotion or qualification
1	Olimpo	38	23	9	6	65	31	+34	78	Primera División
2	San Martín (SJ)	38	18	15	5	51	30	+21	69	Promotion Playoff
3	Huracán	38	19	12	7	62	46	+16	69	Promotion Playoff
4	Atlético de Rafaela	38	19	11	8	51	31	+20	68	Torneo Reducido
5	Tigre	38	18	13	7	48	32	+16	67	Torneo Reducido
6	Chacarita Juniors	38	16	13	9	43	30	+13	61	Torneo Reducido
7	Platense	38	18	7	13	50	39	+11	61	Torneo Reducido
8	Unión	38	15	12	11	45	33	+12	57	
9	Defensa y Justicia	38	15	12	11	39	35	+4	57	
10	Almagro	38	12	13	13	44	55	−11	49	
11	CAI	38	11	12	15	43	43	0	45	
12	Aldosivi	38	12	9	17	44	57	−13	45	
13	San Martín (T)	38	10	14	14	38	49	−11	44	
14	Instituto	38	12	7	19	38	52	−14	43	
15	Tiro Federal	38	8	15	15	35	43	−8	39	
16	Ferro Carril Oeste	38	9	12	17	27	41	−14	39	
17	Huracán (TA)	38	9	11	18	36	56	−20	38	
18	Ben Hur	38	10	6	22	41	62	−21	36	
19	Villa Mitre	38	7	12	19	40	57	−17	33	
20	Talleres (C)	38	5	13	20	34	52	−18	26 (Note: 2 points deducted)	

== 2nd. Promotion playoff ==
This leg was played between the Apertura and the Clausura winner, but as Olimpo won both tournaments, was declared champion and was automatically promoted to 2007–08 Primera División, so the match was played between the best teams placed in the overall standings under Olimpo, San Martín (SJ) and Huracán. The winning team was promoted to 2007–08 Primera División and the losing team played the Promotion Playoff Primera División-Primera B Nacional.

=== Match details ===
2nd. Promotion playoff
10 June 2007

Huracán	1–0	San Martín (SJ)
Milano 47'	Report

Estadio Tomás Ducó, Buenos Aires
Referee: Federico Beligoy

16 June 2007
Second leg

San Martín (SJ)	3–1	Huracán
Tonelotto 28', 90+8'; Brusco 90'	Report	Larrivey 45'

Estadio Hilario Sánchez, San Juan
Referee: Daniel Giménez

Team details

San Martín (SJ)
Huracán

GK
DF
DF
DF
DF
MF
MF
MF
FW
FW
FW
Substitutes:
Manager:
(Argentina) Fernando Quiroz

César Monasterio
Sergio Plaza	(substituted off) a'
José Brusco	Booked
Ariel Agüero	Booked
Alejandro Gómez
Mario Pacheco
Félix Décima	(substituted off) b'
Facundo Torres	(substituted off) c'
Gabriel Roth
Lisandro Sacripanti
Luis Tonelotto
Matías García	(substituted in) a'	Booked
Marcelo Laciar	(substituted in) b'
Daniel E. Díaz	(substituted in) a'

GK	Leonardo Díaz	Booked
DF	Claudio Úbeda	Booked
DF	Christian Díaz
DF	Paolo Goltz	Booked
DF	Cristian Cellay
MF	Gerardo Solana	Booked
MF	Hugo Barrientos
MF	Federico Poggi		(substituted off) c'
MF	Walter Coyette		(substituted off) b'
FW	Mauro Milano
FW	Joaquín Larrivey	Booked	(substituted off) a'
Substitutes:
	Cristian Sánchez Prette		(substituted in) b'
	Hernán Vigna		(substituted in) c'
	Héctor Núñez		(substituted in) a'
Manager:
(Argentina) Antonio Mohamed

Note: San Martín de San Juan won 3–2 on aggregate, promoting to Primera División.

== Torneo Reducido ==
It was played by the teams placed 4th, 5th 6th and 7th in the Overall Standings: Atlético de Rafaela (4th), Tigre (5th), Chacarita Juniors (6th) and Platense (7th). The winning team played the Promotion Playoff Primera División-Primera B Nacional.

=== Semifinals ===
Team 1	Agg.	Team 2	1st leg	2nd leg
Semifinals
Tigre^{1}	3–3	Chacarita Juniors	2–3	1–0
Semifinals
Atlético de Rafaela	2–3	Platense	0–1	2–2

1: Qualified because of sport advantage.

=== Final ===
Team 1	Agg.	Team 2	1st leg	2nd leg
Semifinals
Tigre	2–0	Platense	0–0	2–0

== Promotion playoff Primera División-Primera B Nacional ==
The Promotion playoff loser (Huracán) and the Torneo Reducido winner (Tigre) played against the 18th and the 17th placed of the Relegation Table of 2006–07 Primera División.

Team 1	Agg.	Team 2	1st leg	2nd leg
Relegation/promotion playoff 1
Huracán	5–2	Godoy Cruz	2–0	3–2
Relegation/promotion playoff 2
Tigre	3–1	Nueva Chicago	1–0	2–1

- Huracán was promoted to 2007–08 Primera División by winning the playoff and Godoy Cruz was relegated to 2007–08 Primera B Nacional.
- Tigre was promoted to 2007–08 Primera División by winning the playoff and Nueva Chicago was relegated to 2007–08 Primera B Nacional.

== Relegation ==
Pos	Team	2004–05 Pts	2005–06 Pts	2006–07 Pts	Total Pts	Total Pld	Avg	Situation	Affiliation
1	Olimpo	—	—	78	78	38	2.053		Indirect
2	Huracán	61	56	69	186	114	1.632		Direct
3	Platense	—	—	61	61	38	1.605		Direct
4	Tigre	—	55	67	122	76	1.605		Direct
5	Atlético de Rafaela	58	53	68	179	114	1.57		Indirect
6	San Martín (SJ)	52	55	69	176	114	1.544		Indirect
7	Chacarita Juniors	45	60	61	166	114	1.456		Direct
8	Unión	51	46	57	154	114	1.351		Direct
9	Tiro Federal	63	—	39	102	76	1.342		Indirect
10	Almagro	—	52	49	101	76	1.329		Direct
11	CAI	61	44	57	148	114	1.316		Indirect
12	Defensa y Justicia	40	51	45	148	114	1.298		Direct
13	Aldosivi	—	48	45	93	76	1.224		Indirect
14	Ferro Carril Oeste	52	43	39	134	114	1.175	Relegation Playoff Matches	Direct
15	San Martín (T)	—	—	44	44	38	1.158		Indirect
16	Talleres (C)	49	55	26	130	114	1.14		Indirect
17	Instituto^{1}	—	—	43	43	38	1.132		Indirect
18	Ben Hur^{1}	—	50	36	86	114	1.132	Relegation Playoff Matches	Indirect
19	Huracán (TA)	—	39	38	77	76	1.013	Torneo Argentino A	Indirect
20	Villa Mitre	—	—	33	33	38	0.868	Torneo Argentino A	Indirect

1: Had to play a tiebreaker to see which team played Promotion/relegation Legs.

Note: Clubs with indirect affiliation with AFA are relegated to the Torneo Argentino A, while clubs directly affiliated face relegation to Primera B Metropolitana. Clubs with direct affiliation are all from Greater Buenos Aires, with the exception of Newell's, Rosario Central, Central Córdoba and Argentino de Rosario, all from Rosario, and Unión and Colón from Santa Fe.

=== Tiebreaker ===
Team 1	Score	Team 2
Ben Hur	0–0 (3–4 p)	Instituto

== Relegation playoff matches ==
Team 1	Agg.	Team 2	1st leg	2nd leg
Relegation/promotion playoff 1 (Direct affiliation vs. Primera B Metropolitana)
Estudiantes (BA)	1–1	Ferro Carril Oeste	0–0	1–1
Relegation/promotion playoff 2 (Indirect affiliation vs. Torneo Argentino A)
Guillermo Brown	0–4	Ben Hur	0–1	0–3

- Ferro Carril Oeste remains in Primera B Nacional after a 1-1 aggregate tie by virtue of a "sports advantage". In case of a tie in goals, the team from the Primera B Nacional gets to stay in it.
- Ben Hur remained in the Primera B Nacional by winning the playoff.

== See also ==
- 2006–07 in Argentine football
