= 2003–04 Primera B Nacional =

18th season of the second-tier football league in Argentina

Primera B Nacional
- Season: 2003–04
- Champions: Instituto (2nd divisional title)
- Promoted: Instituto; Almagro; Argentinos Juniors; Huracán (TA)
- Relegated: Gimnasia y Esgrima (CdU); Los Andes
- Top goalscorer: AP: Julio Bevacqua 13 goals CL: Luis Tonelotto 12 goals

The 2003–04 Argentine Primera B Nacional was the 18th season of second division professional football in Argentina. A total of 20 teams competed; the champion and runner-up were promoted to Argentine Primera División.

== Club information ==
Club	City	Stadium
Almagro	José Ingenieros	Tres de Febrero
Argentinos Juniors	Buenos Aires	Diego Armando Maradona
Belgrano	Córdoba	El Gigante de Alberdi
CAI	Comodoro Rivadavia	Municipal de Comodoro Rivadavia
Defensa y Justicia	Florencio Varela	Norberto "Tito" Tomaghello
Defensores de Belgrano	Núñez	Juan Pasquale
El Porvenir	Gerli	Gildo Francisco Ghersinich
Ferro Carril Oeste	Caballito	Arq. Ricardo Etcheverry
Gimnasia y Esgrima	Concepción del Uruguay	Manuel y Ramón Núñez
Gimnasia y Esgrima	San Salvador de Jujuy	23 de Agosto
Godoy Cruz	Mendoza	Malvinas Argentinas
Huracán	Parque Patricios	Tomás Adolfo Ducó
Huracán	Tres Arroyos	Roberto Lorenzo Bottino
Instituto	Córdoba	Presidente Perón
Juventud Antoniana	Salta	Fray Honorato Pistoia
Los Andes	Lomas de Zamora	Eduardo Gallardón
San Martín	Mendoza	San Martín
San Martín	San Juan	Ing. Hilario Sánchez
Tiro Federal	Rosario	Fortín de Ludueña
Unión	Santa Fe	15 de Abril

== Torneo Apertura standings ==
Pos	Team	Pld	W	D	L	GF	GA	GD	Pts	Qualification
1	Instituto	19	10	6	3	34	22	+12	36	Promotion Playoff
2	Belgrano	19	8	5	6	24	19	+5	29	
3	San Martín (M)	19	7	8	4	20	16	+4	29	
4	Huracán (TA)	19	7	7	5	29	24	+5	28	
5	CAI	19	7	6	6	32	30	+2	27	
6	Gimnasia y Esgrima (J)	19	7	6	6	24	24	0	27	
7	Defensa y Justicia	19	8	3	8	22	22	0	27	
8	Defensores de Belgrano	19	6	8	5	27	19	+8	26	
9	Huracán	19	6	8	5	18	20	−2	26	
10	Juventud Antoniana	19	7	4	8	25	27	−2	25	
11	Godoy Cruz	19	6	7	6	17	21	−4	25	
12	Ferro Carril Oeste	19	6	6	7	23	18	+5	24	
13	Argentinos Juniors	19	4	11	4	28	23	+5	23	
14	Tiro Federal	19	4	11	4	26	28	−2	23	
15	Los Andes	19	4	9	6	16	17	−1	21	
16	Almagro	19	5	6	8	22	24	−2	21	
17	Unión	19	4	9	6	19	22	−3	21	
18	El Porvenir	19	5	6	8	19	26	−7	21	
19	Gimnasia y Esgrima (CdU)	19	3	10	6	14	27	−13	19	
20	San Martín (SJ)	19	4	6	9	18	27	−9	18	

== Torneo Clausura standings ==
Pos	Team	Pld	W	D	L	GF	GA	GD	Pts	Qualification
1	Almagro	19	11	4	4	36	19	+17	37	Promotion Playoff
2	Argentinos Juniors	19	11	3	5	28	18	+10	36	
3	Huracán (TA)	19	8	10	1	26	15	+11	34	
4	Godoy Cruz	19	9	6	4	26	21	+5	33	
5	El Porvenir	19	9	4	6	26	16	+10	31	
6	Ferro Carril Oeste	19	9	3	7	20	19	+1	30	
7	San Martín (SJ)	19	8	5	6	22	23	−1	29	
8	Belgrano	19	7	7	5	22	15	+7	28	
9	Huracán	19	7	7	5	31	28	+3	28	
10	Tiro Federal	19	8	3	8	27	26	+1	27	
11	Unión	19	7	5	7	28	29	−1	26	
12	Los Andes	19	6	7	6	23	29	−6	25	
13	Instituto	19	7	3	9	22	24	−2	24	
14	Gimnasia y Esgrima (J)	19	6	4	9	26	32	−6	22	
15	Defensa y Justicia	19	5	6	8	27	34	−7	21	
16	CAI	19	6	2	11	22	24	−2	20	
17	Defensores de Belgrano	19	5	5	9	21	26	−5	20	
18	Gimnasia y Esgrima (CdU)	19	5	4	10	25	32	−7	19	
19	Juventud Antoniana	19	3	8	8	17	32	−15	17	
20	San Martín (M)	19	3	4	12	16	30	−14	13	

== Overall standings ==
Pos	Team	Pld	W	D	L	GF	GA	GD	Pts	Qualification
1	Huracán (TA)	38	15	17	6	55	39	+16	62	Second Promotion Playoff
2	Instituto	38	17	9	12	56	46	+10	60	Promotion Playoff
3	Argentinos Juniors	38	15	14	9	56	41	+15	59	Torneo Reducido
4	Almagro	38	16	10	12	58	43	+15	58	Promotion Playoff
5	Godoy Cruz	38	15	13	10	43	42	+1	58	Torneo Reducido
6	Belgrano	38	15	12	11	46	34	+12	57	
7	Ferro Carril Oeste	38	15	9	14	46	37	+9	54	
8	Huracán	38	13	15	10	49	48	+1	54	
9	El Porvenir	38	14	10	14	45	42	+3	52	
10	Tiro Federal	38	12	14	12	53	54	−1	50	
11	San Martín (SJ)	38	13	11	14	40	50	−10	50	
12	Gimnasia y Esgrima (J)	38	13	10	15	50	56	−6	49	
13	Defensa y Justicia	38	13	9	16	49	56	−7	48	
14	CAI	38	13	8	17	54	54	0	47	
15	Unión	38	11	14	13	47	51	−4	47	
16	Defensores de Belgrano	38	11	13	14	48	45	+3	46	
17	Los Andes	38	10	16	12	39	46	−7	46	
18	San Martín (M)	38	10	12	16	36	46	−10	42	
19	Juventud Antoniana	38	10	12	16	42	59	−17	42	
20	Gimnasia y Esgrima (CdU)	38	8	14	16	39	59	−20	38	

== Promotion playoff ==
This leg was played between the Apertura Winner: Instituto, and the Clausura Winner: Almagro. The winning team was declared champion and was automatically promoted to 2004–05 Primera División and the losing team played the Second Promotion Playoff.

=== Match details ===
Championship playoff
12 June 2004
First leg

Almagro	1–0	Instituto (C)
Tonelotto	Report

Estadio 3 de Febrero, José Ingenieros
Referee: ?

19 June 2004
Second leg

Instituto (C)	2–0 (a.e.t.)	Almagro
Raimonda 16'; Riggio 91'	Report 1 Report 2

Estadio Olímpico, Córdoba
Referee: Daniel Raffa

Team details

Instituto
Almagro

GK	1	(Argentina) Mauricio Caranta
DF	4	(Argentina) Enrique Ortiz
DF	2	(Argentina) Ramón Galarza
DF	6	(Argentina) Hernán Biasotto
DF	3	(Argentina) Gastón Martínez
MF	8	(Argentina) Renato Riggio
MF	5	(Argentina) Cristian Favre
MF	7	(Argentina) Adrián Peralta	(red card) 57'
MF	10	(Argentina) Santiago Raymonda
FW	9	(Argentina) Hernán Boyero
FW	11	(Argentina) Martín Montagna
Manager:
(Argentina) Héctor Rivoira

GK	1	(Argentina) Martín Bernacchia
DF	4	(Argentina) Mauricio Di Benedetto
DF	2	(Argentina) Alejandro Baigorria
DF	6	(Argentina) Alejandro Meloño
DF	3	(Argentina) Rodrigo Bilbao
MF	7	(Argentina) Claudio Filosa
MF	5	(Argentina) Omar Gallardo
MF	8	(Argentina) Sebastián Carrera
MF	10	(Argentina) Hernán Lamberti
FW	9	(Argentina) Luis Tonelotto
FW	11	(Argentina) Maximiliano Castaño
Manager:
(Argentina) Enrique Hrabina & Juan A. Sánchez

== Second Promotion Playoff ==
This leg was played by Almagro, the losing team of the Promotion Playoff, and Huracán (TA), who was the best team in the overall standings. was promoted to 2004–05 Primera División and the losing team played the Promotion Playoff Primera División-Primera B Nacional.

=== Match details ===
Second Promotion Playoff
23 Jun 2004
First leg

Almagro	2–0	Huracán (TA)
Tonelotto; Sparapani	Report

Estadio Almagro, José Ingenieros

26 Jun 2004
Second leg

Huracán (TA)	2–0 (a.e.t.)	Almagro
González; García	Report 1 Report 2
Penalties
Galván (penalty missed); Izquierdo (penalty scored); Guevara (penalty scored); García (penalty scored); Miralles (penalty missed)	3–4	Figueroa (penalty scored); Meloño (penalty scored); Sparapani (penalty scored); Baigorria (penalty scored); Tonelotto (penalty missed)

Estadio Roberto Bottino, Tres Arroyos
Attendance: 7,000

Team details

Huracán (TA)
Almagro

Note: The series ended 2–2 on aggregate, and Almagro promoted to Primera after winning 4–3 on penalties.

== Torneo Reducido ==
It was played by the teams placed 3rd and 5th, in the Overall Standings: Argentinos Juniors (3rd) and Godoy Cruz (5th). The winning team played the Promotion Playoff Primera División-Primera B Nacional.

Team 1	Agg.	Team 2	1st leg	2nd leg
Final
Argentinos Juniors	2–1	Godoy Cruz	0–1	2–0

== Promotion playoff Primera División-Primera B Nacional ==
The Second Promotion playoff loser (Huracán (TA)) and the Torneo Reducido Winner (Argentinos Juniors) played against the 18th and the 17th placed of the Relegation Table of 2003–04 Primera División.

Team 1	Agg.	Team 2	1st leg	2nd leg
Relegation/promotion playoff 1
Huracán (Tres Arroyos)	5–3	Atlético de Rafaela	2–1	3–2
Relegation/promotion playoff 2
Argentinos Juniors	4–2	Talleres (C)	2–1	2–1

- Huracán (TA) was promoted to 2004–05 Primera División by winning the playoff and Atlético de Rafaela was relegated to the 2004–05 Primera B Nacional.
- Argentinos Juniors was promoted to 2004–05 Primera División by winning the playoff and Talleres (C) was relegated to the 2004–05 Primera B Nacional.

== Relegation ==
Note: Clubs with indirect affiliation with AFA are relegated to the Torneo Argentino A, while clubs directly affiliated face relegation to Primera B Metropolitana. Clubs with direct affiliation are all from Greater Buenos Aires, with the exception of Newell's, Rosario Central, Central Córdoba and Argentino de Rosario, all from Rosario, and Unión and Colón from Santa Fe.

=== Metropolitana Zone ===
Pos	Team	2001–02 Pts	2002–03 Pts	2003–04 Pts	Total Pts	Total Pld	Avg	Situation	Affiliation
1	Argentinos Juniors	—	74	59	135	76	1.75		Direct
2	Ferro Carril Oeste	—	—	54	54	38	1.421		Direct
3	Huracán	—	—	54	54	38	1.421		Direct
4	Almagro	43	59	58	160	38	1.404		Direct
5	Defensa y Justicia	57	55	48	160	114	1.404		Direct
6	El Porvenir	59	42	52	153	114	1.342		Direct
7	Defensores de Belgrano	56	49	46	151	114	1.325		Direct
8	Unión	—	—	47	47	38	1.237	Relegation Playoff Matches	Direct
9	Los Andes	49	45	46	140	114	1.228	Primera B Metropolitana	Direct

=== Interior Zone ===
Pos	Team	2001–02 Pts	2002–03 Pts	2003–04 Pts	Total Pts	Total Pld	Avg	Situation	Affiliation
1	Huracán (TA)	63	55	62	180	114	1.579		Indirect
2	Instituto	59	60	60	179	114	1.57		Indirect
3	Godoy Cruz	47	58	58	163	114	1.43		Indirect
4	Belgrano	—	52	57	109	78	1.397		Indirect
5	Gimnasia y Esgrima (J)	58	48	49	155	114	1.36		Indirect
6	San Martín (M)	50	62	42	154	114	1.351		Indirect
7	Tiro Federal	—	—	50	50	38	1.316		Indirect
8	Juventud Antoniana	51	53	42	146	76	1.281		Indirect
9	San Martín (SJ)	57	36	50	143	114	1.254		Indirect
10	CAI	—	45	47	92	76	1.211	Relegation Playoff Matches	Indirect
11	Gimnasia y Esgrima (CdU)	64	33	38	135	114	1.184	Torneo Argentino A	Indirect

== Relegation playoff matches ==
Team 1	Agg.	Team 2	1st leg	2nd leg
Relegation/promotion playoff 1 (Direct affiliation vs. Primera B Metropolitana)
Tristán Suárez	0–3	Unión	0–0	0–3
Relegation/promotion playoff 2 (Indirect affiliation vs. Torneo Argentino A)
Atlético Tucumán	1–1	CAI	0–1	1–0

- Unión remains in the Primera B Nacional by winning the playoff.
- CAI remains in Primera B Nacional after a 1-1 aggregate tie by virtue of a "sports advantage". In case of a tie in goals, the team from the Primera B Nacional gets to stay in it.

== See also ==
- 2003–04 in Argentine football
