= Carlos Yaqué =

Argentine footballer

Personal information
- Full name: Carlos Alberto Yaqué
- Date of birth: 12 September 1971 (age 55)
- Place of birth: Buenos Aires, Argentina
- Height: 1.77 m (5 ft 10 in)
- Position: Forward

Senior career*
Years	Team	Apps	(Gls)
1989–1992	Almagro		
1992	Real Cartagena	1	(0)
1992–1993	Nueva Chicago	14	(2)
1994–1997	Almagro		
1997–1998	Ferro Carril Oeste	28	(9)
1998	Reggina	2	(0)
1999–2000	Estudiantes	28	(5)
2000	Universitario	20	(8)
2000–2002	Argentinos Juniors	44	(12)
2002	L.D.U. Quito	18	(8)
2003	Ceuta	12	(5)
2003–2004	Huracán	30	(9)
2004–2005	Defensores de Belgrano	27	(6)
2005–2006	Almagro		
2007	Villa Mitre	15	(2)
2007–2009	Los Andes	66	(21)
2009–2010	Almagro		
2010–2011	Sarmiento	25	(4)
2011	Comunicaciones	15	(1)
Total		345	(92)
- * Club domestic league appearances and goals

Carlos Alberto Yaqué (born 12 September 1971) is an Argentine former professional footballer who played as a forward.

== Career ==
Almagro were the club who gave Yaqué his start in senior football, with the forward appearing for the team in Primera B Metropolitana between 1989 and 1992. Yaqué moved abroad for the first time in 1992, signing for Colombia's Real Cartagena of Categoría Primera A. He departed midway through the year after just one appearance, as the club went on to suffer relegation. Yaqué had returned to Argentina with Nueva Chicago. After spending 1992–93 with them, Yaqué returned to third tier Almagro in 1994. They won promotion to Primera B Nacional in his second campaign back. He remained there for one further season.

In 1997, Yaqué completed a move to Argentine Primera División side Ferro Carril Oeste. Nine goals in twenty-eight fixtures followed. 1998 saw Yaqué leave his homeland once more, agreeing terms with Reggina of the Italian Serie B. He left halfway into the 1998–99 season, signing for Estudiantes in early 1999. Yaqué stuck with Estudiantes until the middle of 2000, which was followed by him signing a contract with Universitario. He scored eight goals for the Peruvians, which preceded Argentinos Juniors becoming Yaqué's eighth club. His return to Argentina lasted until 2002, when Ecuador's L.D.U. Quito signed Yaqué.

Yaqué, having featured eighteen times and netted eight goals in the Ecuadorian Serie A, had a stint in European football for the second time in 2003, after spending time with Ceuta in Segunda División B - scoring five times in twelve matches. A move to Huracán sealed a return to Argentina, where he would stay for the rest of his career. Thirty appearances with Huracán came, before Yaqué experienced 2004–05 with Defensores de Belgrano in tier two; though it would end with relegation. He rejoined Almagro for a third time in 2005, prior to having spells with Villa Mitre and Los Andes; who he'd score twenty-one goals for.

After being sent off in his final appearance for Los Andes, Yaqué joined Almagro for a fourth time in 2009. He took his overall league tally for Almagro to two hundred and thirty-two games and one hundred and fifty-five goals - including ten goals in 2009–10, where he netted against former teams Los Andes and Nueva Chicago. Yaqué also scored home and away that season in fixtures with Comunicaciones, a club he would later join in 2011. However, prior to that, Yaqué played for Sarmiento - he found the net four times for the Junín outfit. The final goal of his career came on 22 August 2011 during a defeat to Brown.

== Personal life ==
Yaqué's sons, Nahuel and Nicolás, are professional footballers; they both played for Almagro at differing levels within the club. Since retirement, Yaqué has worked as an agent; including for Lautaro Martínez.

== Career statistics ==
Appearances and goals by club, season and competition
Club	Season	League			Cup		League Cup		Continental		Other		Total	
Club	Season	Division	Apps	Goals	Apps	Goals	Apps	Goals	Apps	Goals	Apps	Goals	Apps	Goals
Real Cartagena	1992	Categoría Primera A	1	0	0	0	—		—		0	0	1	0
Nueva Chicago	1992–93	Primera B Nacional	14	2	0	0	—		—		0	0	14	2
Ferro Carril Oeste	1997–98	Argentine Primera División	28	9	0	0	—		—		0	0	28	9
Reggina	1998–99	Serie B	2	0	0	0	—		—		0	0	2	0
Universitario	2000	Peruvian Primera División	16	8	0	0	—		4 (Note: Appearance(s) in the Copa Libertadores)	0	0	0	20	8
L.D.U. Quito	2002	Serie A	18	8	0	0	—		—		0	0	18	8
Ceuta	2002–03	Segunda División B	12	5	0	0	0	0	—		0	0	12	5
Huracán	2003–04	Primera B Nacional	30	9	0	0	—		—		0	0	30	9
Defensores de Belgrano	2004–05	Primera B Nacional	27	6	0	0	—		—		0	0	27	6
Villa Mitre	2006–07	Primera B Nacional	15	2	0	0	—		—		0	0	15	2
Los Andes	2007–08	Primera B Metropolitana	37	14	0	0	—		—		0	0	37	14
Los Andes	2008–09	Primera B Nacional	29	7	0	0	—		—		2 (Note: Appearance(s) in the Primera B Nacional play-offs)	0	31	7
Los Andes	Total		66	21	0	0	—		—		2	0	68	21
Sarmiento	2010–11	Primera B Metropolitana	25	4	0	0	—		—		0	0	25	4
Comunicaciones	2011–12	Primera B Metropolitana	15	1	0	0	—		—		0	0	15	1
Career total			269	75	0	0	0	0	4	0	2	0	275	75
