= Matías Sánchez =

Matías Sánchez may refer to:

- Matías Sánchez (footballer, born 1979), Argentine footballer
- Matías Sánchez (footballer, born 1983), Argentine footballer
- Matías Sánchez (footballer, born 1987), Argentine footballer
- Matías Sánchez (footballer, born 1990), Chilean footballer
- Matías Sánchez (footballer, born 1996), Argentine footballer
- Matías Sánchez (volleyball), Argentine volleyball player
