= 2001–02 Primera B Nacional =

16th season of the second-tier football league in Argentina

Primera B Nacional
- Season: 2001–02
- Champions: Olimpo (1st divisional title)
- Promoted: Olimpo; Arsenal
- Relegated: Central Córdoba (R); Atlético Tucumán; Tigre; Independiente Rivadavia; Racing (C); Platense; Villa Mitre
- Top goalscorer: Diego Ceballos 26 goals

The 2001–02 Argentine Primera B Nacional was the 16th season of second division professional of football in Argentina. A total of 25 teams competed; the champion and runner-up were promoted to Argentine Primera División.

== Club information ==
Club	City	Stadium
Almagro	José Ingenieros	Tres de Febrero
Almirante Brown	Arrecifes	Estadio Municipal
Arsenal	Sarandí	Julio H. Grondona
Atlético de Rafaela	Rafaela	Nuevo Monumental
Atlético Tucumán	San Miguel de Tucumán	Monumental Presidente Jose Fierro
Central Córdoba	Rosario	Gabino Sosa
Defensa y Justicia	Florencio Varela	Norberto "Tito" Tomaghello
Defensores de Belgrano	Núñez	Juan Pasquale
El Porvenir	Gerli	Gildo Francisco Ghersinich
Gimnasia y Esgrima	Concepción del Uruguay	Manuel y Ramón Núñez
Gimnasia y Esgrima	San Salvador de Jujuy	23 de Agosto
Godoy Cruz	Mendoza	Malvinas Argentinas
Huracán	Tres Arroyos	Roberto Lorenzo Bottino
Independiente Rivadavia	Mendoza	Bautista Gargantini
Instituto	Córdoba	Presidente Perón
Juventud Antoniana	Salta	Fray Honorato Pistoia
Los Andes	Lomas de Zamora	Eduardo Gallardón
Olimpo	Bahía Blanca	Roberto Natalio Carminatti
Platense	Florida	Ciudad de Vicente López
Quilmes	Quilmes	Centenario
Racing	Córdoba	Miguel Sancho
San Martín	Mendoza	San Martín
San Martín	San Juan	Ing. Hilario Sánchez
Tigre	Victoria	José Dellagiovanna
Villa Mitre	Bahía Blanca	El Fortín

== Torneo Apertura Standings ==
Pos	Team	Pld	W	D	L	GF	GA	GD	Pts	Promotion
1	Olimpo	24	13	7	4	36	20	+16	46	Primera División
2	Quilmes	24	13	6	5	36	24	+12	45	
3	San Martín (M)	24	12	8	4	37	24	+13	44	
4	Huracán (TA)	24	13	2	9	33	32	+1	41	
5	Gimnasia y Esgrima (J)	24	11	6	7	35	29	+6	39	
6	Gimnasia y Esgrima (CdU)	24	11	6	7	35	29	+6	39	
7	Juventud Antoniana	24	11	5	8	32	27	+5	38	
8	Instituto	24	11	5	8	38	34	+4	38	
9	El Porvenir	24	9	11	4	24	20	+4	38	
10	Defensores de Belgrano	24	10	7	7	37	25	+12	37	
11	San Martín (SJ)	24	9	8	7	32	28	+4	35	
12	Atlético de Rafaela	24	10	5	9	33	30	+3	35	
13	Arsenal	24	8	9	7	17	22	−5	33	
14	Los Andes	24	10	3	11	25	28	−3	33	
15	Defensa y Justicia	24	9	6	9	16	27	−11	33	
16	Almagro	24	8	8	8	16	17	−1	32	
17	Independiente Rivadavia	24	7	10	7	31	24	+7	31	
18	Atlético Tucumán	24	7	8	9	35	40	−5	29	
19	Central Córdoba (R)	24	7	6	11	36	41	−5	27	
20	Almirante Brown (A)	24	6	7	11	22	38	−16	25	
21	Platense	24	6	6	12	24	35	−11	24	
22	Villa Mitre	24	6	5	13	22	36	−14	23	
23	Godoy Cruz	24	5	6	13	33	47	−14	21	
24	Racing (C)	24	4	7	13	25	46	−21	19	
25	Tigre	24	3	5	16	27	47	−20	14	

== Torneo Clausura Standings ==
It was divided in 3 Zones with 8 teams in each zone. Olimpo did not compete as it was promoted to Primera División.

=== Zone A ===
Pos	Team	Pld	W	D	L	GF	GA	GD	Pts	Qualification
1	Arsenal	14	10	1	3	27	8	+19	31	Second Promotion Playoff
2	Central Córdoba (R)	14	9	3	2	30	21	+9	30	
3	Instituto	14	6	3	5	20	23	−3	21	
4	Quilmes	14	6	2	6	17	15	+2	20 (Note: 3 points deducted in the overall standings)	
5	Almirante Brown (A)	14	5	4	5	18	19	−1	19	
6	Los Andes	14	4	4	6	20	23	−3	16	
7	Juventud Antoniana	14	4	1	9	12	23	−11	13	
8	Tigre	14	2	2	10	12	24	−12	8	

=== Zone B ===
Pos	Team	Pld	W	D	L	GF	GA	GD	Pts	Qualification
1	Gimnasia y Esgrima (CdU)	14	7	4	3	25	16	+9	25	Second Promotion Playoff
2	Platense	14	7	4	3	24	16	+8	25	
3	Defensa y Justicia	14	7	3	4	24	19	+5	24	
4	Atlético de Rafaela	14	7	3	4	28	23	+5	24	
5	Racing (C)	14	7	3	4	29	25	+4	24	
6	El Porvenir	14	6	3	5	25	23	+2	21	
7	San Martín (M)	14	0	6	8	14	30	−16	6	
8	Atlético Tucumán	14	0	4	10	8	25	−17	4	

=== Zone C ===
Pos	Team	Pld	W	D	L	GF	GA	GD	Pts	Qualification
1	Godoy Cruz	14	7	5	2	22	15	+7	26	Second Promotion Playoff
2	San Martín (SJ)	14	6	4	4	22	17	+5	22	
3	Huracán (TA)	14	6	4	4	24	20	+4	22	
4	Villa Mitre	14	6	3	5	17	18	−1	21	
5	Defensores de Belgrano	14	5	4	5	20	18	+2	19	
6	Gimnasia y Esgrima (J)	14	5	4	5	16	17	−1	19	
7	Independiente Rivadavia	14	3	4	7	10	20	−10	13	
8	Almagro	14	3	2	9	17	23	−6	11	

== Overall standings ==
Pos	Team	Pld	W	D	L	GF	GA	GD	Pts	Qualification
1	Arsenal	38	18	10	10	57	30	+27	64 (Note: Already qualified to the Second Promotion Playoff by winning their zones)	
2	Gimnasia y Esgrima (CdU)	38	18	10	10	60	45	+15	64	
3	Huracán (TA)	38	19	6	13	57	52	+5	63	Second Promotion Playoff
4	Quilmes	38	19	8	11	53	39	+14	62 (Note: 3 points deducted)	Second Promotion Playoff
5	Atlético de Rafaela	38	17	8	13	61	53	+8	59	Second Promotion Playoff
6	El Porvenir	38	15	14	9	49	43	+6	59	Second Promotion Playoff
7	Instituto	38	17	8	13	58	57	+1	59	Second Promotion Playoff
8	Gimnasia y Esgrima (J)	38	16	10	12	51	40	+11	58	
9	San Martín (SJ)	38	15	12	11	54	45	+9	57	
10	Central Córdoba (R)	38	16	9	13	66	61	+5	57	
11	Defensa y Justicia	38	16	9	13	56	55	+1	57	
12	Defensores de Belgrano	38	15	11	12	57	43	+14	56	
13	Juventud Antoniana	38	15	6	17	44	50	−6	51	
14	San Martín (M)	38	12	14	12	51	54	−3	50	
15	Los Andes	38	14	7	17	56	58	−2	49	
16	Platense	38	13	10	15	48	51	−3	49	
17	Godoy Cruz	38	12	11	15	51	62	−11	47	
18	Independiente Rivadavia	38	10	14	14	41	44	−3	44	
19	Villa Mitre	38	12	8	18	39	54	−15	44	
20	Almirante Brown (A)	38	11	11	16	40	57	−17	44	
21	Almagro	38	11	10	17	52	56	−4	43	
22	Racing (C)	38	11	10	17	54	71	−17	43	
23	Atlético Tucumán	38	7	12	19	43	65	−22	33	
24	Tigre	38	5	7	26	39	72	−33	22	

== Second Promotion Playoff ==
The Second Promotion Playoff or Torneo Reducido was played by the teams who won their respective zones in the Torneo Clausura: Arsenal (winner of Zone A), Gimnasia y Esgrima (CdU) (winner of Zone B) and Godoy Cruz (winner of Zone C) and the five best teams placed in the overall standings: Huracán (TA) (3rd), Quilmes (4th), Atlético de Rafaela (5th), El Porvenir (6th) and Instituto (7th). The winner was promoted to Primera División.

=== Bracket ===
Quarterfinals
1	Arsenal	1	4	5
17	Godoy Cruz	2	1	3
3	Huracán (TA)	0	0	0
6	El Porvenir	0	1	1
2	Gimnasia y Esgrima (CdU)	0	5	5
7	Instituto	0	2	2
4	Quilmes	0	2	2
5	Atlético de Rafaela	2	1	3

Semifinals
1	Arsenal	1	2	3
6	El Porvenir	0	0	0
2	Gimnasia y Esgrima (CdU)	2	4	6
5	Atlético de Rafaela	0	2	2

Final
1	Arsenal	2	1	3
2	Gimnasia y Esgrima (CdU)	1	1	2

- Note: The team in the first line plays at home the second leg.

=== Match details ===
2001–02 Second Promotion Playoff
11 May 2002
First leg

Gimnasia y Esgrima (CdU)	1–2	Arsenal
?		Espínola; Gareca

Estadio de Gimnasia y Esgrima, Concepción del Uruguay

18 May 2002
Second leg

Arsenal	1–1	Gimnasia y Esgrima (CdU)
Morales 51'	Report 1 Report 2	Leguizamón 38'

Estadio de Arsenal, Sarandí
Referee: Héctor Baldassi

Team details

Arsenal
Gimnasia y Esgrima (CdU)

GK	1	Alejandro Limia
DF	4	Darío Espíndola
DF	2	Carlos Ruiz
DF	6	Víctor Molina
DF	3	Oscar Espíndola
MF	7	Patricio González
MF	5	Gastón Esmerado
MF	10	Rubén Palavecino
MF	8	Gustavo Grondona
FW	9	Facundo Gareca
FW	11	Javier Morales
Manager:
(Argentina) Jorge Burruchaga

GK	Catriel Orcellet
DF	Juan Monge
DF	Luciano González
DF	Mauricio Almada
MF	Hernán Orcellet
MF	Ricardo Vendakis
MF	Oscar Sena
MF	Pablo Cantero
FW	Leonardo Colombo
FW	Luciano Leguizamón
FW	Diego Ceballos
Manager:
(Argentina) Jorge Vendakis

Note: Arsenal won 3–2 on aggregate, promoting to Primera División.

== Promotion Playoff Primera División-Primera B Nacional ==
The best two teams in the overall standings that weren't promoted (Huracán (TA) and Gimnasia y Esgrima (CdU)) played against the 18th and the 17th placed of the Relegation Table of 2001–02 Primera División.

Team 1	Agg.	Team 2	1st leg	2nd leg
Relegation/promotion playoff 1
Huracán (TA)	2–3	Lanús	1–2	1–1
Relegation/promotion playoff 2
Gimnasia y Esgrima (CdU)	3–4	Unión de Santa Fe	3-1	0-3

- Lanus remains in Primera División after winning the playoff.
- Unión remains in Primera División after winning the playoff.

== Relegation ==
7 teams were relegated: 2 teams with the worst co-efficient from Interior Zone, 2 teams with the worst co-efficient from Metropolitana Zone and 3 more teams regardless their affiliation.

Pos	Team	1999–00 Pts	2000–01 Pts	2001–02 Pts	Total Pts	Total Pld	Avg	Situation	Affiliation
1	Instituto	—	71	59	130	70	1.857		Indirect
2	Quilmes	63	50	62	175	96	1.823		Direct
3	Arsenal	55	44	64	163	96	1.698		Direct
4	Gimnasia y Esgrima (CdU)	47	55	64	166	100	1.66		Indirect
5	Huracán (TA)	—	—	63	63	38	1.658		Indirect
6	San Martín (SJ)	49	50	57	156	100	1.56		Indirect
7	Los Andes	63	—	49	112	72	1.556		Direct
8	Atlético de Rafaela	51	45	59	155	100	1.55		Indirect
9	Gimnasia y Esgrima (J)	—	50	58	108	70	1.543		Indirect
10	San Martín (M)	50	51	50	151	100	1.51		Indirect
11	Defensores de Belgrano	—	—	56	56	38	1.474		Direct
12	Defensa y Justicia	52	29	57	138	96	1.438		Direct
13	Almagro	62	—	40	102	72	1.417		Direct
14	Juventud Antoniana	46	43	51	140	100	1.4		Indirect
15	Almirante Brown (A)	40	50	44	134	100	1.34		Indirect
16	Godoy Cruz	43	44	47	134	100	1.34		Indirect
17	El Porvenir	50	19	59	128	96	1.333		Direct
18	Racing (C)	38	52	43	133	100	1.33	Torneo Argentino A	Indirect
19	Platense	45	33	49	127	96	1.323	Primera B Metropolitana	Direct
20	Central Córdoba (R)	38	31	57	126	96	1.313	Primera B Metropolitana	Direct
21	Villa Mitre	41	43	44	128	100	1.28	Torneo Argentino A	Indirect
22	Independiente Rivadavia	45	35	44	124	100	1.24	Torneo Argentino A	Indirect
23	Atlético Tucumán	29	43	33	105	100	1.05	Torneo Argentino A	Indirect
24	Tigre	45	26	22	93	96	0.969	Primera B Metropolitana	Direct

Note: Clubs with indirect affiliation with AFA are relegated to the Torneo Argentino A, while clubs directly affiliated face relegation to Primera B Metropolitana. Clubs with direct affiliation are all from Greater Buenos Aires, with the exception of Newell's, Rosario Central, Central Córdoba and Argentino de Rosario, all from Rosario, and Unión and Colón from Santa Fe.

== See also ==
- 2001–02 in Argentine football
