= Nicolás Yaqué =

Argentine footballer

Personal information
- Full name: Nicolás Emiliano Yaqué
- Date of birth: 5 May 1993 (age 33)
- Place of birth: Argentina
- Position: Forward

Senior career*
Years	Team	Apps	(Gls)
2014–2017	Almagro	38	(1)
2017	San Pedro	0	(0)
2017–2018	Gavà	8	(0)
2018	Tortosa	3	(0)
- * Club domestic league appearances and goals

Nicolás Emiliano Yaqué (born 5 May 1993) is an Argentine professional footballer who plays as a forward. He is currently a free agent.

== Club career ==
Yaqué began his senior career with Almagro. He made his debut in a Primera B Metropolitana loss to Villa Dálmine on 22 April 2014, on the way to a total of thirty-seven appearances in three campaigns. In 2015, Yaqué scored his first professional goal in a fixture with Comunicaciones on 7 November - in a season which culminated with promotion to Primera B Nacional, where he'd play twice before leaving the club. On 31 January 2017, Yaqué switched Argentina for Spain by joining San Pedro. A move to fellow Tercera División team Gavà followed, along with eight appearances. Tortosa of Primera Catalana, tier four, signed Yaqué in early 2018.

== International career ==
In October 2015, Yaqué received a call-up to train with the Argentina U23s.

== Personal life ==
Carlos Yaqué, a former professional footballer, is the father of Yaqué. Nahuel Yaqué is his brother, with the two footballers playing together for San Pedro, Gavà and Tortosa.

== Career statistics ==
As of 2 April 2019.

Appearances and goals by club, season and competition
Club	Season	League			Cup		League Cup		Continental		Other		Total	
Club	Season	Division	Apps	Goals	Apps	Goals	Apps	Goals	Apps	Goals	Apps	Goals	Apps	Goals
Almagro	2013–14	Primera B Metropolitana	2	0	0	0	—		—		0	0	2	0
Almagro	2014	Primera B Metropolitana	8	0	0	0	—		—		0	0	8	0
Almagro	2015	Primera B Metropolitana	26	1	0	0	—		—		1 (Note: Appearance(s) in the Primera B Metropolitana play-offs)	0	27	1
Almagro	2016	Primera B Nacional	2	0	1	0	—		—		0	0	3	0
Almagro	2016–17	Primera B Nacional	0	0	0	0	—		—		0	0	0	0
Almagro	Total		38	1	1	0	—		—		1	0	40	1
San Pedro	2016–17	Tercera División	0	0	0	0	0	0	—		0	0	0	0
Gavà	2017–18	Tercera División	8	0	0	0	0	0	—		0	0	8	0
Tortosa	2017–18	Primera Catalana	3	0	0	0	—		—		0	0	3	0
Career total			50	1	1	0	0	0	—		1	0	52	1
