= 2005–06 Argentine Primera División =

115th season of top-tier football league in Argentina

Primera División
- Season: 2005–06
- Dates: 5 August 2005 – 14 May 2006
- Champions: Apertura: Boca Juniors (27th title); Clausura: Boca Juniors (28th title)
- 2007 Copa Libertadores: Boca Juniors; Gimnasia y Esgrima (LP); River Plate; Banfield; Vélez Sarsfield
- 2006 Copa Sudamericana: Gimnasia y Esgrima (LP); Banfield; Vélez Sarsfield; Lanús; San Lorenzo

The 2005–06 Argentine Primera División was the 115th season of top-flight football in Argentina. The season ran from 5 August 2005 to 14 May 2006.

Tiro Federal (2004–05 Primera B Nacional champion) and Gimnasia y Esgrima de Jujuy (after beating Huracán in a second promotion playoff) were promoted from Primera B Nacional.

Boca Juniors won both, Apertura and Clausura championships totalising 28 league titles to date, while Instituto (C), Tiro Federal and Olimpo were relegated.

== Torneo Apertura ==
Apertura
- Season: 2005
- Dates: 5 August – 14 December
- Champions: Boca Juniors (27th. title)
- Promoted: Tiro Federal; Gimnasia y Esgrima (J)
- Top goalscorer: (Argentina) Javier Cámpora (13)
- Biggest home win: Newell's 5–0 Instituto (16 Nov); Banfield 5–0 S. Lorenzo (25 Nov)
- Biggest away win: GELP 0–6 Vélez (20 Aug)
- Highest scoring: S. Lorenzo 5–3 T. Federal (13 Nov)

=== Final standings ===
Pos	Team	Pld	W	D	L	GF	GA	GD	Pts
1	Boca Juniors	19	12	4	3	36	17	+19	40
2	Gimnasia y Esgrima (LP)	19	11	4	4	28	19	+9	37
3	Vélez Sarsfield	19	10	3	6	26	16	+10	33
4	Independiente	19	8	8	3	34	22	+12	32
5	Banfield	19	5	13	1	25	15	+10	28
6	River Plate	19	8	4	7	31	22	+9	28
7	Estudiantes (LP)	19	8	4	7	23	22	+1	28
8	Argentinos Juniors	19	8	4	7	19	20	−1	28
9	San Lorenzo	19	8	4	7	33	39	−6	28
10	Colón	19	7	5	7	28	27	+1	26
11	Racing	19	7	4	8	28	27	+1	25
12	Olimpo	19	5	8	6	19	23	−4	23
13	Lanús	19	5	8	6	21	31	−10	23
14	Arsenal	19	5	7	7	23	24	−1	22
15	Rosario Central	19	5	7	7	20	29	−9	22
16	Newell's Old Boys	19	5	5	9	25	27	−2	20
17	Quilmes	19	4	7	8	20	27	−7	19
18	Gimnasia y Esgrima (J)	19	3	9	7	23	30	−7	18
19	Tiro Federal	19	4	3	12	22	31	−9	15
20	Instituto	19	2	9	8	11	27	−16	15

Source: AFA
Rules for classification: 1st points; 2nd goal difference; 3rd goals scored; 4th head-to-head points; 5th head-to-head goal difference; 6th head-to-head goals scored. This does not apply to determining the champion. If two or more teams are tied in point at the end of the tournament, a playoff will be held at a neutral venue within 72 hours for the championship

=== Top scorers ===
Rank.	Player	Team	Goals
1	(Argentina) Javier Cámpora	Tiro Federal	13
2	(Argentina) Leonardo Pisculichi	Argentinos Juniors	10
2	(Argentina) Rodrigo Palacio	Boca Juniors	10
2	(Uruguay) Gonzalo Vargas	Gimnasia y Esgrima LP	10
2	(Argentina) José Luis Calderón	Estudiantes LP	10
3	(Argentina) Nicolás Frutos	Independiente	9
3	(Argentina) Sergio Agüero	Independiente	9
3	(Spain) Iván Moreno y Fabianesi	Colón	9

== Torneo Clausura ==
Clausura
- Season: 2006
- Dates: 27 January – 14 May
- Champions: Boca Juniors (28th. title)
- Relegated: Instituto (Cba); Tiro Federal; Olimpo
- Top goalscorer: (Uruguay) Gonzalo Vargas (12)
- Biggest home win: Argentinos 4–0 T. Federal (15 Apr); GELP 4–0 Quilmes (16 Apr); Boca Jrs. 4–0 Estudiantes LP (30 Apr)
- Biggest away win: T. Federal 0–5 River (29 Jan); Instituto 0–5 Independiente (1 Feb)
- Highest scoring: Arsenal 2–5 GELP (19 Mar)

=== Final standings ===
Pos	Team	Pld	W	D	L	GF	GA	GD	Pts	Qualification
1	Boca Juniors	19	13	4	2	37	14	+23	43	2007 Copa Libertadores Second Stage
2	Lanús	19	10	5	4	26	15	+11	35	
3	River Plate	19	9	7	3	39	24	+15	34	
4	Gimnasia y Esgrima (J)	19	10	3	6	26	16	+10	33	
5	Gimnasia y Esgrima (LP)	19	9	5	5	31	22	+9	32	
6	Newell's Old Boys	19	8	7	4	27	18	+9	31	
7	Banfield	19	10	1	8	28	22	+6	31	
8	San Lorenzo	19	7	7	5	15	14	+1	28	
9	Olimpo	19	7	5	7	22	22	0	26	
10	Vélez Sarsfield	19	5	10	4	21	18	+3	25	
11	Estudiantes (LP)	19	6	6	7	25	31	−6	24	
12	Independiente	19	6	5	8	18	18	0	23	
13	Rosario Central	19	5	8	6	15	17	−2	23	
14	Argentinos Juniors	19	5	7	7	26	28	−2	22	
15	Arsenal	19	5	7	7	17	20	−3	22	
16	Colón	19	5	5	9	19	26	−7	20	
17	Quilmes	19	5	5	9	11	28	−17	20	
18	Racing	19	5	4	10	14	24	−10	19	
19	Instituto	19	3	4	12	16	37	−21	13	
20	Tiro Federal	19	3	3	13	15	39	−24	12	

Source: AFA
Rules for classification: 1st points; 2nd goal difference; 3rd goals scored; 4th head-to-head points; 5th head-to-head goal difference; 6th head-to-head goals scored. This does not apply to determining the champion. If two or more teams are tied in point at the end of the tournament, a playoff will be held at a neutral venue within 72 hours for the championship

=== Top scorers ===
Rank.	Player	Team	Goals
1	(Uruguay) Gonzalo Vargas	Gimnasia y Esgrima LP	12
2	(Argentina) Ernesto Farías	River Plate	11
2	(Argentina) Martín Palermo	Boca Juniors	11
3	(Argentina) Ignacio Scocco	Newell's Old Boys	9
4	(Argentina) Sergio Agüero	Independiente	7
4	(Argentina) Silvio Carrario	Quilmes	7
4	(Argentina) Ezequiel Maggiolo	Olimpo	7
4	(Argentina) Rodrigo Palacio	Boca Juniors	7

== Relegation ==
=== Relegation table ===
Pos	Team	2003–04 Pts	2004–05 Pts	2005–06 Pts	Total Pts	Total Pld	Avg	Relegation
1	Boca Juniors	75	48	83	206	114	1.807	
2	River Plate	66	60	62	188	114	1.649	
3	Vélez Sarsfield	53	73	58	184	114	1.614	
4	Banfield	64	59	59	182	114	1.596	
5	San Lorenzo	62	52	56	170	114	1.491	
6	Newell's Old Boys	51	60	51	162	114	1.421	
7	Gimnasia y Esgrima (LP)	38	54	69	161	114	1.412	
8	Estudiantes (LP)	44	61	52	157	114	1.377	
9	Lanús	42	54	58	154	114	1.351	
10	Arsenal	55	54	43	153	114	1.342	
11	Gimnasia y Esgrima (J)	—	—	51	51	38	1.342	
12	Racing	50	58	44	152	114	1.333	
13	Rosario Central	44	61	45	150	114	1.316	
14	Independiente	44	49	55	148	114	1.298	
15	Colón	49	53	46	148	114	1.298	
16	Quilmes	60	44	39	143	114	1.254	
17	Argentinos Juniors	—	43	50	93	76	1.224	Relegation Playoff Matches
18	Olimpo	39	43	49	131	114	1.149	Relegation Playoff Matches
19	Instituto	—	42	28	70	76	0.921	Relegated to the Primera B Nacional
20	Tiro Federal	—	—	27	27	38	0.711	Relegated to the Primera B Nacional

=== Promotion playoff ===
* Winner of the series; teams currently playing in Primera División are listed first

Series	Team 1 (1st div)	Team 2 (2nd div)	1st. leg	Venue 1	City 1	2nd. leg	Venue 2	City 2	Agg.
1	Olimpo	Belgrano (C)	1–2	Chateau Carreras	Córdoba	1–2	Roberto Carminatti	Bahía Blanca	4–2
2	Argentinos Juniors	Huracán	1–1	Tomás A. Ducó	Buenos Aires	2–2	Diego A. Maradona	Buenos Aires	4–4 (Note: Remained in Primera División due to a sporting advantage rule.)

Belgrano de Córdoba promoted to Primera (relegating Olimpo), while Argentinos Juniors remained in the top division by sporting advantage (the series had ended 4–4 on aggregate)

== See also ==
- 2005–06 in Argentine football
