= Nahuel Yaqué =

Argentine footballer

Personal information
- Full name: Nahuel Sebastián Yaqué
- Date of birth: 18 March 1995 (age 31)
- Place of birth: Ciudadela, Argentina
- Position: Midfielder

Youth career
- Almagro

Senior career*
Years	Team	Apps	(Gls)
2017	San Pedro	5	(0)
2017–2018	Gavà	14	(0)
2018	Tortosa	2	(0)
2018–2019	Villa Dálmine	1	(0)
- * Club domestic league appearances and goals as of 19:11, 1 April 2019 (UTC)

Nahuel Sebastián Yaqué (born 18 March 1995) is an Argentine professional footballer who plays as a midfielder, most recently for Villa Dálmine.

== Career ==
Yaqué was produced in Argentina by Almagro's youth system. In 2017, Yaqué moved to Spain after agreeing terms with Tercera División side San Pedro. Five appearances followed, which preceded the midfielder signing for Gavà - a fellow fourth tier team. He featured fourteen times for the Catalonia outfit until his departure on 17 January 2018. Yaqué then had a stint with Primera Catalana's Tortosa, where he made two appearances; against Sant Ildefons and Valls respectively. Later that year, on 29 June, Yaqué returned to his homeland with Villa Dálmine. He made his bow in a Primera B Nacional win over Olimpo on 8 December. He left the club at the end of the 2018–19 season.

== Personal life ==
Yaqué is the son of former footballer Carlos Yaqué, who made one hundred appearances in the Argentine Primera División for three clubs as well as playing for teams in Colombia, Ecuador, Italy, Peru and Spain. His brother, Nicolás, is also a footballer - they played together for San Pedro, Gavà and Tortosa in Spanish football.

== Career statistics ==
As of 1 April 2019.

Appearances and goals by club, season and competition
Club	Season	League			Cup		League Cup		Continental		Other		Total	
Club	Season	Division	Apps	Goals	Apps	Goals	Apps	Goals	Apps	Goals	Apps	Goals	Apps	Goals
San Pedro	2016–17	Tercera División	5	0	0	0	0	0	—		0	0	5	0
Gavà	2017–18	Tercera División	14	0	0	0	0	0	—		0	0	14	0
Tortosa	2017–18	Primera Catalana	2	0	0	0	—		—		0	0	2	0
Villa Dálmine	2018–19	Primera B Nacional	1	0	0	0	—		—		0	0	1	0
Career total			22	0	0	0	0	0	—		0	0	22	0
