= Nicolás Ibáñez =

Nicolás Ibáñez may refer to:

- Nicolás Ibáñez (footballer, born 1992), Argentine forward for Deportivo Español
- Nicolás Ibáñez (footballer, born 1994), Argentine forward for Cruz Azul
