= Moreyra =

Moreyra is a surname. Notable people with the surname include:

- Carlos Moreyra y Paz Soldán (1898–1981), Peruvian engineer and politician
- Eugênia Álvaro Moreyra (1898–1948), Brazilian journalist, actress, and theater director
- Fernando Moreyra (born 1990), Argentine footballer
- Julio Moreyra (born 1981), Argentine footballer
- Stefano Moreyra (born 2001), Argentine footballer
