= Depetris =

Depetris is a surname. Notable people with the surname include:

- David Depetris (born 1988), Argentine-born Slovak footballer
- Leandro Depetris (born 1988), Argentine footballer
- Marie-Chantal Depetris-Demaille (1941–2025), French fencer
- Rodrigo Depetris (born 1990), Argentine footballer
