= Facundo Gareca =

Argentine footballer

Personal information
- Full name: Facundo Guillermo Gareca
- Date of birth: 5 October 1973 (age 53)
- Place of birth: Concepción, Tucumán, Argentina
- Position: Forward

Team information
- Current team: Universidad de Concepción (assistant)

Senior career*
Years	Team	Apps	(Gls)
1992–1994	Atlético Tucumán	48	(21)
1994–1995	Ferro Carril Oeste	8	(0)
1995–1996	Hapoel Beit She'an	9	(1)
1996–1998	Arsenal de Sarandí	25	(9)
1998	Alianza Lima	19	(8)
1999	Bella Vista	9	(2)
1999–2000	Arsenal de Sarandí	22	(6)
2000–2001	Huracán	10	(0)
2001–2002	Arsenal de Sarandí	27	(24)
2002	Comunicaciones	15	(8)
2002–2003	Arsenal de Sarandí	29	(13)
2003	UA Maracaibo	7	(2)
2004–2005	Tiro Federal	27	(10)
2005–2006	Chacarita Juniors	39	(7)
2006–2007	Atlético Tucumán	18	(5)
2007–2009	Deportivo Español	50	(14)
2009–2011	Excursionistas	39	(5)
2012	Camioneros	–	(–)

Managerial career
- 2012: Flandria (assistant)
- 2012: Flandria (caretaker)
- 2012: Atlanta (assistant)
- 2013: Platense (assistant)
- 2014–2015: Villa Dálmine (assistant)
- 2016: Arsenal de Sarandí (assistant)
- 2017: Nueva Chicago (assistant)
- 2017: Los Andes (assistant)
- 2018–2021: Arsenal de Sarandí (assistant)
- 2021–2022: Central Córdoba SdE (assistant)
- 2022: Colón (assistant)
- 2023: Villa Dálmine
- 2026–: Universidad de Concepción (assistant)
- 2026: Universidad de Concepción (caretaker)
- * Club domestic league appearances and goals

Facundo Guillermo Gareca (born 5 October 1973) is an Argentine football manager and former player who played as a forward.

== Career ==
Born in Concepción, Tucumán, Argentina, Gareca started his career with Atlético Tucumán. In his homeland, he played for clubs such as Ferro Carril Oeste, Arsenal de Sarandí, Huracán, among others.

Abroad, Gareca played in Israel for Hapoel Beit She'an, Peru for Alianza Lima, Uruguay for Bella Vista, Guatemala for Comunicaciones and Venezuela for UA Maracaibo.

With Tiro Federal, Gareca won the 2004–05 Primera B Nacional.

Gareca retired in 2012, aged 38. His last club was Camioneros.

== Coaching career ==
Gareca has mainly developed his career as an assistant coach. He assumed as caretaker coach for Flandria in May 2012. As a head coach, he led Villa Dálmine in 2023.

In 2026, Gareca joined the technical staff of Juan Cruz Real for Chilean club Universidad de Concepción and assumed as caretaker manager in March after Real moved to the United States.

== Honours ==
=== Player ===
Tiro Federal

- Primera B Nacional: 2004–05
