= Matías Sánchez (footballer, born 1983) =

Argentine footballer (born 1983)

Personal information
- Full name: Matías Ezequiel Sánchez
- Date of birth: 5 March 1983 (age 43)
- Place of birth: Rafaela, Argentina
- Position: Midfielder

Senior career*
Years	Team	Apps	(Gls)
2001–2002	Atlético de Rafaela	0	(0)
2002–2003	9 de Julio	1	(0)
2006–2007	San Telmo	8	(0)
2009	Deportivo Moquehuá	6	(0)
2015	Atlético Concepción	11	(0)
- * Club domestic league appearances and goals

Matías Ezequiel Sánchez (born 5 March 1983) is an Argentine footballer who plays as a midfielder. He is currently a free agent.

== Career ==
Sánchez started his career with Primera B Nacional outfit Atlético de Rafaela, but departed in 2002 to join 9 de Julio of Torneo Argentino A. He made one appearance before leaving in 2003. Three years later, Sánchez played for San Telmo in Primera B Metropolitana, he made eight professional appearances as San Telmo finished 12th. Further moves to Deportivo Moquehuá and Atlético Concepción then followed.

== Career statistics ==
As of 20 January 2018.

Club statistics
Club	Season	League			Cup (Note: Includes the Copa Argentina)		League Cup		Continental		Other		Total	
Club	Season	Division	Apps	Goals	Apps	Goals	Apps	Goals	Apps	Goals	Apps	Goals	Apps	Goals
Atlético de Rafaela	2001–02	Primera B Nacional	0	0	0	0	—		—		0	0	0	0
9 de Julio	2002–03	Torneo Argentino A	1	0	0	0	—		—		0	0	1	0
San Telmo	2006–07	Primera B Metropolitana	8	0	0	0	—		—		0	0	8	0
Deportivo Moquehuá	2009	Torneo Argentino C	6	0	0	0	—		—		0	0	6	0
Atlético Concepción	2015	Torneo Federal B	11	0	0	0	—		—		0	0	11	0
Career total			26	0	0	0	—		—		0	0	26	0
