= Estadio Julio Humberto Grondona =

Football stadium in Sarandí, Argentina

Coordinates: 34°40′42″S 58°20′25″W

Julio Grondona Stadium
- Estadio Julio Grondona
- El Viaducto
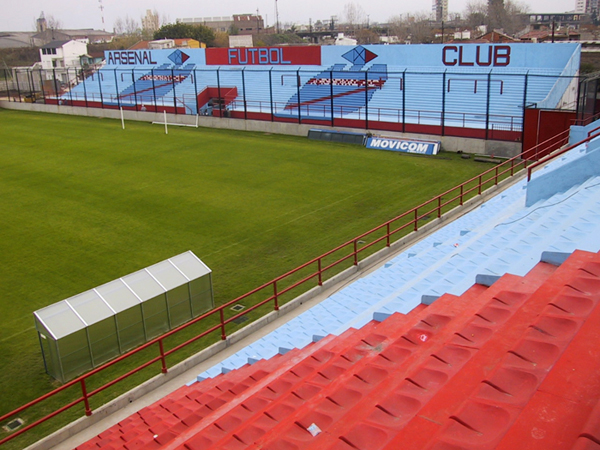
- The stadium in 1999
- Interactive map of Julio Grondona Stadium
- Full name: Estadio Julio Humberto Grondona
- Address: Sarandí; Argentina
- Owner: Arsenal F.C.
- Capacity: 18,500
- Surface: Grass
- Field size: 103 x 70 m

Construction
- Opened: October 12, 1964
- Renovated: 2004

Tenant
- Arsenal F.C.

Website
- arsenalfc.com.ar/estadio

Estadio Julio Humberto Grondona, nicknamed El Viaducto, is a football stadium located in the city of Sarandí in Avellaneda Partido, Argentina. It is owned and operated by Arsenal Fútbol Club. and has a capacity of 18,500 spectators.

The stadium is named after Julio Grondona, co-founder, first president (1957−1976), and player of Arsenal F.C. and then president of the Argentine Football Association from 1979 to his death in 2014.

== Overview ==
The stadium was built during the presidency of Mario Actis on a land that belonged to the General Direction of Ports of Buenos Aires. The first grandstand was acquired to Club Atlético Banfield while the stalls (with capacity for 1,400 people) was built with money given by club members, the same for the press booths.

Arsenal invested m$n14 million to build the stadium, originally for 5,000 spectators. The first match held in the stadium was on 22 August 1964, when Arsenal played vs Almirante Brown, winning 2–0 (Grudzien and Grondona (Note: Source does not indicate if the player was Julio or Héctor Grondona (his brother), who also played for Arsenal, apart from being one of their founding members.) scored). But it was not until 12 October 1964 when the stadium was officially inaugurated in a friendly match, Arsenal vs Banfield.

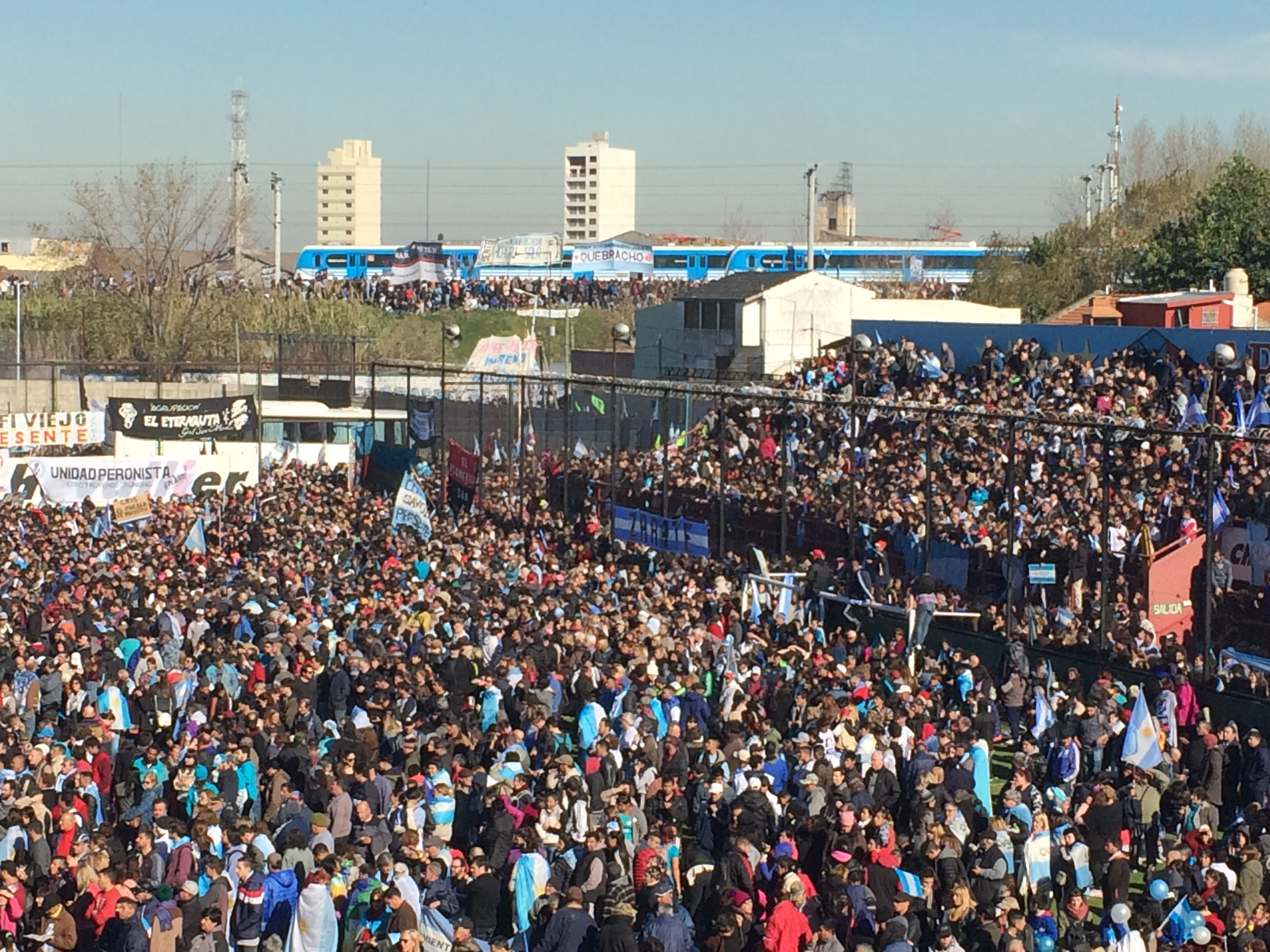
The crowd at the stadium during a political event in June 2017

In 2001, the club built a new grandstand made of concrete. During the time works were carried out, the team played their home venues at C.A. Lanús Stadium, returning to Sarandí in December. After Arsenal promoted to Primera División in 2002, the club decided to completely refurbish the stadium, replacing the remaining wooden grandstands for concrete ones. As a result, the team had to move to other venues while works were in progress, first to Lanús Stadium and then to Racing Stadium.

Works finished in 2004, and the stadium was officially re-inaugurated in the 2004 Copa Sudamericana match when Arsenal vs Banfield, which was also Arsenal's debut in an international football competition. The match ended 1–1.

In 2017, former President of Argentina Cristina Fernández de Kirchner was the only speaker in the launching of her political party, Unidad Ciudadana, held in Estadio Julio Grondona.
