= Victoriano Frágola =

Argentine professional footballer

Personal information
- Full name: Victoriano José Frágola
- Date of birth: 21 July 1994 (age 32)
- Place of birth: Pergamino, Argentina
- Height: 1.87 m (6 ft 2 in)
- Position: Centre-back

Team information
- Current team: B71

Youth career
- Douglas Haig
- Gimnasia y Esgrima (P)
- CA Jorge Griffa
- Atlético de Rafaela

Senior career*
Years	Team	Apps	(Gls)
2015–2016	Tiro Federal	1	(1)
2016	Canadian	0	(0)
2016	San José	13	(2)
2017	Atlántico		
2017–2018	Douglas Haig	15	(0)
2018	Naples United		
2019	CA Bermejo		
2019	Naples United		
2021–	B71		
- * Club domestic league appearances and goals as of 19:53, 3 February 2021 (UTC)

Victoriano José Frágola (born 21 July 1994) is an Argentine professional footballer who plays as a centre-back for B71. Besides Argentina, he has played in Bolivia, Dominican Republic, the United States, and the Faroe Islands.

== Career ==
Frágola had youth spells with Douglas Haig, Gimnasia y Esgrima de Pergamino, Club Atlético Jorge Griffa and Atlético de Rafaela. He began his senior career with Torneo Federal A team Tiro Federal. He made his debut on 22 March 2015 during a loss to Sportivo Las Parejas, though Frágola had made it 1–1 after netting his first career goal. August 2016 saw Frágola move to Uruguay with Segunda División outfit Canadian. However, in September, the defender penned terms with San José of the Bolivian Primera División. He scored on debut against Sport Boys on 16 October, before netting versus Nacional Potosí on 30 November.

Early 2017 saw Frágola head to the Dominican Republic with Atlántico. In August of that year, Frágola returned to his homeland with Torneo Federal A's Douglas Haig. He made sixteen total appearances, ten as a starter, across 2017–18, though was sent off in his final match for them on 12 March 2018 away to Gimnasia y Esgrima (CdU). After departing Douglas Haig months later, Frágola moved to National Premier Soccer League club Naples United in the United States. In early 2019, Frágola had a short stint back in Bolivian football with Tarija regional team Club Atlético Bermejo before returning to the US with Naples United in mid-2019.

In June 2019, it was revealed that Frágola had reported former team San José to FIFA due to unpaid wages; totalling $3,000, which the governing body forced the Bolivians to pay in the succeeding July. On 2 February 2021, Frágola completed a move to the Faroe Islands with 1. deild side B71; becoming the club's first Argentine player.

== Career statistics ==
As of 3 February 2021.

Appearances and goals by club, season and competition
Club	Season	League			Cup		League Cup		Continental		Other		Total	
Club	Season	Division	Apps	Goals	Apps	Goals	Apps	Goals	Apps	Goals	Apps	Goals	Apps	Goals
Tiro Federal	2015	Torneo Federal A	1	1	0	0	—		—		0	0	1	1
Canadian	2016	Segunda División	0	0	—		—		—		0	0	0	0
San José	2016–17	Primera División	13	2	—		—		—		0	0	13	2
Douglas Haig	2017–18	Torneo Federal A	15	0	1	0	—		—		0	0	16	0
Career total			29	3	1	0	—		—		0	0	30	3
