= Hernán Lamberti =

Argentine footballer

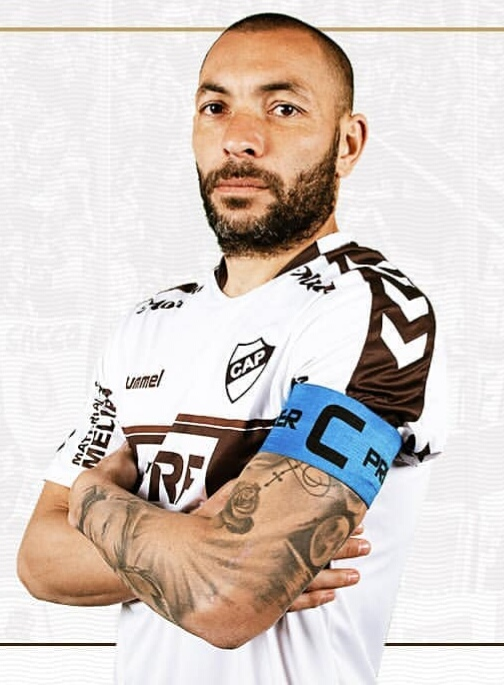
- Lamberti with Platense

Personal information
- Full name: Hernán Agustín Lamberti
- Date of birth: 3 May 1984 (age 42)
- Place of birth: Castelar, Argentina
- Height: 1.72 m (5 ft 8 in)
- Position: Midfielder

Team information
- Current team: Platense (youth coordinator)

Youth career
- Almagro

Senior career*
Years	Team	Apps	(Gls)
2003–2005	Almagro	46	(0)
2005	Guaraní	16	(1)
2006	All Boys	14	(0)
2006	Juventud Antoniana		
2007	Olmedo	36	(1)
2008	Juventud Antoniana		
2009	Flamengo-SP		
2009–2012	Sportivo Desamparados	109	(13)
2012–2016	Aldosivi	128	(4)
2016–2017	Central Córdoba SdE	43	(4)
2017–2022	Platense	130	(4)
2022	Quilmes	13	(0)
2023	Almirante Brown	13	(0)
2023–2024	Colegiales	37	(0)

Managerial career
- 2025: Platense (caretaker)
- * Club domestic league appearances and goals

Hernán Agustín Lamberti (born 3 May 1984) is an Argentine football coach and former player who played as a midfielder. He is the current youth coordinator of Platense.

== Career ==
Lamberti's senior career got underway in 2003 with Almagro in Primera B Nacional, with the midfielder featuring twenty-five times throughout the 2003–04 campaign which Almagro ended with promotion to the Primera División. After twenty-one matches as the club were relegated, Lamberti left in 2005 to join Guaraní of the Paraguayan Primera División. One goal in sixteen fixtures followed. Lamberti returned to Argentina with All Boys in 2006, before going to Juventud Antoniana soon after. Ecuadorian Serie A side Olmedo signed Lamberti in 2007. They placed third in his sole season, making thirty-six appearances and netting once.

2008 saw Lamberti rejoin Juventud Antoniana, which preceded a stint in Brazilian football with Flamengo. Sportivo Desamparados became Lamberti's seventh unique career club in 2009. He remained with the Argentine third tier club for two seasons. After they won promotion from the 2010–11 Torneo Argentino A, he scored seven goals in thirty-seven encounters in Primera B Nacional. Lamberti moved across the division to Aldosivi on 2 July 2012. He made his bow in August against Huracán, with his opening goal coming in 2013 versus Almirante Brown. Lamberti had five campaigns with Aldosivi, two in tier one.

Following a 2016–17 spell in Primera B Nacional with Central Córdoba, as they suffered relegation, Lamberti agreed terms with Primera B Metropolitana's Platense in August 2017. Thirty-three matches for the Florida Este team occurred in his debut season, which culminated with promotion to the second tier after defeating Estudiantes in a championship play-off.

== Career statistics ==
As of 12 March 2019.

Appearances and goals by club, season and competition
Club	Season	League			Cup		Continental		Other		Total	
Club	Season	Division	Apps	Goals	Apps	Goals	Apps	Goals	Apps	Goals	Apps	Goals
Almagro	2003–04	Primera B Nacional	25	0	0	0	—		0	0	25	0
Almagro	2004–05	Argentine Primera División	21	0	0	0	—		0	0	21	0
Almagro	Total		46	0	0	0	—		0	0	46	0
Guaraní	2005	Paraguayan Primera División	16	1	—		2 (Note: Appearance(s) in the Copa Sudamericana)	0	0	0	18	1
All Boys	2005–06	Primera B Metropolitana	14	0	0	0	—		0	0	14	0
Olmedo	2007	Serie A	36	1	—		—		0	0	36	1
Flamengo	2009	Paulista Série A2	—		0	0	—		0	0	0	0
Sportivo Desamparados	2011–12	Primera B Nacional	37	7	1	0	—		0	0	38	7
Aldosivi	2012–13	Primera B Nacional	35	1	1	0	—		0	0	36	1
Aldosivi	2013–14	Primera B Nacional	39	2	0	0	—		0	0	39	2
Aldosivi	2014	Primera B Nacional	14	1	0	0	—		2 (Note: Appearance(s) in the Primera B Nacional play-offs)	0	16	1
Aldosivi	2015	Argentine Primera División	27	0	0	0	—		3 (Note: Appearance(s) in the Argentine Primera División play-offs)	0	30	0
Aldosivi	2016	Argentine Primera División	13	0	1	0	—		0	0	14	0
Aldosivi	Total		128	4	2	0	—		5	0	135	4
Central Córdoba	2016–17	Primera B Nacional	43	4	0	0	—		0	0	43	4
Platense	2017–18	Primera B Metropolitana	32	0	1	0	—		1 (Note: Appearance(s) in the Primera B Metropolitana play-offs)	0	34	0
Platense	2018–19	Primera B Nacional	18	0	2	0	—		0	0	20	0
Platense	Total		50	0	3	0	—		1	0	54	0
Career total			370	17	6	0	2	0	6	0	384	17

== Honours ==
Platense

- Primera B Metropolitana: 2017–18
