= Nicolás Ibáñez (footballer, born 1992) =

Argentinian association football player

Personal information
- Full name: Nicolás Ibáñez
- Date of birth: 16 January 1992 (age 34)
- Place of birth: Quilmes, Argentina
- Height: 1.84 m (6 ft 1/2 in)
- Position: Forward

Youth career
- Lanús

Senior career*
| Years | Team | Apps | (Gls) |
| 2012–2014 | Lanús | 0 | (0) |
| 2012–2013 | → Gimnasia y Esgrima (loan) | 33 | (2) |
| 2013–2014 | → Flandria (loan) | 29 | (0) |
| 2014 | Tiro Federal | 13 | (1) |
| 2015–2016 | San Lorenzo | 24 | (5) |
| 2016–2018 | Deportivo Español | 39 | (2) |
- * Club domestic league appearances and goals as of 21:13, 6 September 2018 (UTC)

Nicolás Ibáñez (born 16 January 1992) is an Argentine professional footballer who plays as a forward. He is currently a free agent.

== Career ==
Ibáñez started his senior footballing career with Lanús of the Argentine Primera División, he didn't appear competitively for the first-team but was loaned out on two occasions. On 2 August 2012, Ibáñez joined Primera B Nacional side Gimnasia y Esgrima. He made his professional debut on 20 August during a goalless draw with Nueva Chicago. In the following October, Ibáñez scored the first two goals of his career in matches against Banfield and Crucero del Norte. In July 2013, Ibáñez was loaned to Primera B Metropolitana's Flandria. Twenty-nine appearances followed as Flandria were relegated to Primera C.

On 18 August 2014, Ibáñez was signed permanently by Tiro Federal of Torneo Federal A. His first appearance arrived on 24 August versus Talleres, which was followed by thirteen further appearances and one goal during 2014. 2015 saw Ibáñez sign for fellow Torneo Federal A team San Lorenzo. He went on to score six goals, including a brace against Américo Tesorieri on 4 October, in thirty appearances. In June 2016, Ibáñez joined Primera B Metropolitana club Deportivo Español.

== Career statistics ==
As of 6 September 2018.

Club statistics
| Club | Season | League | | | Cup (Note: Includes the Copa Argentina) | | League Cup | | Continental (Note: Includes the Copa Libertadores and Copa Sudamericana) | | Other | | Total | |
| Club | Season | Division | Apps | Goals | Apps | Goals | Apps | Goals | Apps | Goals | Apps | Goals | Apps | Goals |
|---|---|---|---|---|---|---|---|---|---|---|---|---|---|---|
| Lanús | 2012–13 | Primera División | 0 | 0 | 0 | 0 | — | | 0 | 0 | 0 | 0 | 0 | 0 |
| Lanús | 2013–14 | Primera División | 0 | 0 | 0 | 0 | — | | 0 | 0 | 0 | 0 | 0 | 0 |
| Lanús | Total | | 0 | 0 | 0 | 0 | — | | 0 | 0 | 0 | 0 | 0 | 0 |
| Gimnasia y Esgrima (loan) | 2012–13 | Primera B Nacional | 33 | 2 | 1 | 0 | — | | — | | 0 | 0 | 34 | 2 |
| Flandria (loan) | 2013–14 | Primera B Metropolitana | 29 | 0 | 0 | 0 | — | | — | | 0 | 0 | 29 | 0 |
| Tiro Federal | 2014 | Torneo Federal A | 13 | 1 | 2 | 0 | — | | — | | 1 (Note: One appearance in 2014 Torneo Federal A play-offs) | 0 | 16 | 1 |
| San Lorenzo | 2015 | Torneo Federal A | 24 | 5 | 0 | 0 | — | | — | | 6 (Note: Six appearances in 2015 Torneo Federal A play-offs) | 1 (Note: One goal in 2015 Torneo Federal A play-offs) | 30 | 6 |
| San Lorenzo | 2016 | Torneo Federal A | 0 | 0 | 0 | 0 | — | | — | | 0 | 0 | 0 | 0 |
| San Lorenzo | Total | | 24 | 5 | 0 | 0 | — | | — | | 6 | 1 | 30 | 6 |
| Deportivo Español | 2016–17 | Primera B Metropolitana | 21 | 0 | 0 | 0 | — | | — | | 0 | 0 | 21 | 0 |
| Deportivo Español | 2017–18 | Primera B Metropolitana | 18 | 2 | 0 | 0 | — | | — | | 0 | 0 | 18 | 2 |
| Deportivo Español | Total | | 39 | 2 | 0 | 0 | — | | — | | 0 | 0 | 39 | 2 |
| Career total | | | 138 | 10 | 3 | 0 | — | | 0 | 0 | 7 | 1 | 148 | 11 |
