= Fernando Moreyra =

Argentine footballer (born 1990)

Personal information
- Full name: Fernando Ezequiel Moreyra Aldana
- Date of birth: 9 August 1990 (age 36)
- Place of birth: Rosario, Argentina
- Height: 1.84 m (6 ft 0 in)
- Position: Defender

Team information
- Current team: Patronato

Youth career
- Central Córdoba Rosario
- Jorge Griffa
- Newell's Old Boys

Senior career*
Years	Team	Apps	(Gls)
2010–2011	Newell's Old Boys	0	(0)
2011–2013	Gimnasia de Jujuy	0	(0)
2013–2019	San Jorge	59	(3)
2015	→ Czech football (loan)	–	(–)
2015	→ Tiro Federal (loan)	11	(0)
2018	→ Kristianstad FC (loan)	10	(0)
2019–2020	Sportivo Belgrano	22	(1)
2020–2022	Deportivo Maipú	41	(0)
2022–2023	Villa Dálmine	30	(2)
2023–2024	Agropecuario	36	(1)
2024	Deportes Limache	3	(0)
2024–2025	Deportivo Morón	16	(0)
2025–	Patronato	25	(0)
- * Club domestic league appearances and goals as of 17:32, 23 March 2026 (UTC)

Fernando Ezequiel Moreyra Aldana (born 9 August 1990) is an Argentine footballer who plays as a defender for Patronato.

== Club career ==
Born in Rosario, Argentina, Moreyra was with Central Córdoba, Asociación Atlética Jorge Griffa and Newell's Old Boys in his hometown as a youth player. He was a member of the first team of Newell's Old Boys before switching to Gimnasia y Esgrima de Jujuy. In 2013, he joined San Jorge. He was loaned out to a Czech club, Tiro Federal in 2015 and Kristianstad FC in the Swedish Division 1 Södra in 2018. There, he played 10 games.

In 2019, Moreyra joined Sportivo Belgrano. The next year, he switched to Deportivo Maipú, with whom he got promotion to the 2021 Primera Nacional.

In 2022 and 2023, Moreyra played for Villa Dálmine and Agropecuario in the Primera Nacional, respectively.

In 2024, he moved abroad again and signed with Deportes Limache in the Primera B de Chile.
