= Lisandro Sacripanti =

Argentine footballer

Personal information
- Full name: Oscar Lisandro Sacripanti
- Date of birth: 7 January 1982 (age 44)
- Place of birth: Rosario, Santa Fe, Argentina
- Height: 1.72 m (5 ft 8 in)
- Position: Forward

Senior career*
Years	Team	Apps	(Gls)
2001–2003	Newell's Old Boys	42	(10)
2003	Cobreloa	10	(3)
2004	Argentinos Juniors	4	(0)
2005	Hapoel Nazareth Illit	9	(0)
2005–2006	Blooming	41	(15)
2006	Morelia B	13	(2)
2007	San Martín (SJ)	21	(4)
2007	Independiente Rivadavia	11	(1)
2008	Espoli	11	(3)
2008–2009	NK Celje	30	(7)
2010–2011	Talleres de Córdoba	51	(12)
2012	Blooming	25	(5)
2014	Unión de Villa Krause	15	(7)
2015	Deportivo Maipú	13	(1)
- * Club domestic league appearances and goals

Oscar Lisandro Sacripanti (born 7 January 1982) is a retired Argentine football forward.

In his extensive career Sacripanti played for first division clubs such as Newell's Old Boys and Argentinos Juniors in his native Argentina, as well as other lower division clubs including San Martín de San Juan, Independiente Rivadavia, Talleres de Córdoba, Unión de Villa Krause and Deportivo Maipú. He also played abroad for Bolivian club Blooming in two periods, Cobreloa in Chile, Hapoel Nazareth Illit from Israel, Monarcas Morelia in Mexico, Espoli of Ecuador and recently with NK CM Celje in Slovenia.

== Honours ==
=== Club ===
Cobreloa

- Primera División de Chile (3): 2003 Apertura, 2003 Clausura

Blooming

- Primera Division de Bolivia (1): 2005 Apertura
