= Patricio González =

Argentine footballer

Personal information
- Full name: Patricio Hernán González
- Date of birth: December 20, 1979 (age 46)
- Place of birth: Buenos Aires, Argentina
- Height: 1.74 m (5 ft 8 1/2 in)
- Position: Defensive midfielder

Senior career*
| Years | Team | Apps | (Gls) |
| 1998–1999 | Lanús | 2 | (0) |
| 1999–2006 | Arsenal de Sarandí | - | |
| 2006–2007 | Germinal | 7 | (1) |
| 2007–2008 | Barcelona SC | 8 | (0) |
| 2008–2009 | Defensa y Justicia | 0 | (0) |
| 2009 | All Boys | 11 | (0) |
| 2009–2011 | Ferro Carril Oeste | 39 | (5) |
| 2009–2013 | Temperley | | |
- * Club domestic league appearances and goals

Patricio González (born December 20, 1979, in Buenos Aires) is an Argentine football midfielder.

== Career ==
González started his career at Lanús in the Primera Division Argentina in 1998 but he was soon sold to second division side Arsenal de Sarandí. In 2002 Arsenal were promoted to the primera and in 2004 they played their first ever competitive international fixture against Club Bolívar of Bolivia.

During the summer of 2006 González and four other Argentine players were spotted by Germinal, González signed a 4-year contract with the club that should have kept him in Belgium until 2010, but he failed to impress, making only 7 appearances for the club before being loaned to Barcelona de Guayaquil.

In 2008, he joined up with All Boys of the Argentine 2nd division. One year later, he joined Ferro Carril Oeste in the same division.
