= Leandro Depetris =

Argentine footballer (born 1988)

Personal information
- Full name: Leandro Depetris
- Date of birth: January 24, 1988 (age 38)
- Place of birth: Rafaela, Argentina
- Height: 1.67 m (5 ft 6 in)
- Position: Striker

Team information
- Current team: Tiro Federal
- 2000: Newell's Old Boys
- 2000–2005: AC Milan
- 2003–2004: → River Plate (loan)

Senior career*
Years	Team	Apps	(Gls)
2005–2008	Brescia	24	(1)
2008–2009	Independiente	1	(0)
2009–2010	Gallipoli	7	(0)
2010	Chioggia	4	(0)
2010–2011	Sanremese		
2011–2012	Sportivo Belgrano		
2012–2014	Delta Porto Tolle	8	(0)
2014	Triestina		
2014–2015	CA Alvarado	16	(0)
2015–	Tiro Federal	14	(0)
- * Club domestic league appearances and goals

Leandro Depetris (born 24 January 1988 in Rafaela) is an Argentine professional footballer, who currently plays for Tiro Federal.

== Career ==
"Depetris at 11 was more famous than [Lionel] Messi. – I remember Depetris played in a tournament in Córdoba against Newell's in the final. He played against Messi. Depetris' team won. After the game, all the microphones, all the journalists surrounded Depetris. Nobody went near Messi."

— In an interview with Richard Fitzpatrick of Bleacher Report, Lionel Messi's teammate from La Maquina del '87 (Newell's Old Boys youth team) Franco Falleroni pointed out that there was more noise being made in Rosario about Depetris, who was a year younger than Messi.

Depetris started his career at Club Atlético Brown San Vicente and played later for Newell's Old Boys de Rosario. In summer 2000 in the age of eleven signed for Italian Serie A side AC Milan and was 2003 loaned to River Plate. He was signed by Brescia in summer 2005, but due to FIFA rule, his transfer would be made official after his 18th birthday. He scored in his debut and only appearances in 2005-06 Serie B season. De Petris played the 2010/2011 season for A.C. Chioggia Sottomarina and US Sanremese Calcio 1904.
