= 2004–05 Primera B Nacional =

19th season of the second-tier football league in Argentina

Primera B Nacional
- Season: 2004–05
- Champions: Tiro Federal (1st divisional title)
- Promoted: Tiro Federal; Gimnasia y Esgrima (J)
- Relegated: Sarmiento (J); Racing (C); Defensores de Belgrano
- Top goalscorer: AP: Rubén Ramírez 15 goals CL: Héctor Silva 11 goals

The 2004–05 Argentine Primera B Nacional was the 19th season of second division professional of football in Argentina. A total of 20 teams competed; the champion and runner-up were promoted to Argentine Primera División.

== Club information ==
Club	City	Stadium
Atlético de Rafaela	Rafaela	Nuevo Monumental
Belgrano	Córdoba	El Gigante de Alberdi
CAI	Comodoro Rivadavia	Municipal de Comodoro Rivadavia
Chacarita Juniors	Villa Maipú	Chacarita Juniors
Defensa y Justicia	Florencio Varela	Norberto "Tito" Tomaghello
Defensores de Belgrano	Núñez	Juan Pasquale
El Porvenir	Gerli	Gildo Francisco Ghersinich
Ferro Carril Oeste	Caballito	Arq. Ricardo Etcheverry
Gimnasia y Esgrima	San Salvador de Jujuy	23 de Agosto
Godoy Cruz	Mendoza	Malvinas Argentinas
Huracán	Parque Patricios	Tomás Adolfo Ducó
Juventud Antoniana	Salta	Fray Honorato Pistoia
Nueva Chicago	Mataderos	Nueva Chicago
Racing	Córdoba	Miguel Sancho
San Martín	Mendoza	San Martín
San Martín	San Juan	Ing. Hilario Sánchez
Sarmiento	Junín	Eva Perón
Talleres	Córdoba	Estadio La Boutique
Tiro Federal	Rosario	Fortín de Ludueña
Unión	Santa Fe	15 de Abril

== Torneo Apertura standings ==
Pos	Team	Pld	W	D	L	GF	GA	GD	Pts	Qualification
1	Gimnasia y Esgrima de Jujuy (J)	19	10	6	3	30	15	+15	36	Promotion Playoff
2	CAI	19	10	4	5	27	21	+6	34	
3	Nueva Chicago	19	9	5	5	24	16	+8	32	
4	Tiro Federal	19	9	5	5	28	24	+4	32	
5	Atlético de Rafaela	19	9	2	8	32	30	+2	29	
6	San Martín (M)	19	8	5	6	22	22	0	29	
7	Ferro Carril Oeste	19	7	7	5	23	22	+1	28	
8	San Martín (SJ)	19	7	6	6	22	18	+4	27	
9	Racing (C)	19	7	6	6	31	28	+3	27	
10	El Porvenir	19	7	6	6	21	22	−1	27	
11	Huracán	19	8	3	8	18	20	−2	27	
12	Unión	19	7	5	7	30	27	+3	26	
13	Belgrano	19	6	7	6	19	21	−2	25	
14	Godoy Cruz	19	6	4	9	27	27	0	22	
15	Defensa y Justicia	19	6	4	9	20	25	−5	22	
16	Talleres (C)	19	5	6	8	18	18	0	21	
17	Defensores de Belgrano	19	6	3	10	23	27	−4	21	
18	Juventud Antoniana	19	4	7	8	23	31	−8	19	
19	Chacarita Juniors	19	4	6	9	23	29	−6	18	
20	Sarmiento (J)	19	4	5	10	20	37	−17	17	

== Torneo Clausura standings ==
Pos	Team	Pld	W	D	L	GF	GA	GD	Pts	Qualification
1	Tiro Federal	19	10	5	4	30	17	+13	35	Promotion Playoff
2	Huracán	19	8	10	1	26	18	+8	34	
3	Atlético de Rafaela	19	7	8	4	26	23	+3	29	
4	Talleres (C)	19	6	10	3	27	18	+9	28	
5	Belgrano	19	8	4	7	22	23	−1	28	
6	Chacarita Juniors	19	7	6	6	30	28	+2	27	
7	CAI	19	8	3	8	25	23	+2	27	
8	Gimnasia y Esgrima de Jujuy (J)	19	6	9	4	14	17	−3	27	
9	San Martín (M)	19	6	8	5	29	24	+5	26	
10	Juventud Antoniana	19	6	8	5	23	20	+3	26	
11	San Martín (SJ)	19	6	7	6	18	16	+2	25	
12	Godoy Cruz	19	6	7	6	23	27	−4	25	
13	Unión	19	5	10	4	23	28	−5	25	
14	Ferro Carril Oeste	19	5	9	5	24	20	+4	24	
15	Nueva Chicago	19	5	8	6	21	20	+1	23	
16	Racing (C)	19	4	7	8	22	27	−5	19	
17	El Porvenir	19	4	7	8	14	22	−8	19	
18	Defensores de Belgrano	19	5	4	10	18	27	−9	19	
19	Defensa y Justicia	19	3	9	7	15	20	−5	18	
20	Sarmiento (J)	19	3	5	11	25	37	−12	14	

== Overall standings ==
Pos	Team	Pld	W	D	L	GF	GA	GD	Pts	Qualification
1	Tiro Federal	38	19	10	9	58	41	+17	67	Promotion Playoff
2	Gymmasia y Esgrima de Jujuy (J)	38	16	15	7	44	32	+12	63	Promotion Playoff
3	Huracán	38	18	7	13	52	44	+8	61	Second Promotion Playoff
4	CAI	38	16	13	9	44	38	+6	61	Torneo Reducido
5	Atlético de Rafaela	38	16	10	12	58	53	+5	58	Torneo Reducido
6	Nueva Chicago	38	14	13	11	36	28	+8	55	Torneo Reducido
7	San Martín (M)	38	14	13	11	51	46	+5	55	Torneo Reducido
8	Belgrano	38	14	11	13	41	44	−3	53	
9	San Martín (SJ)	38	13	13	12	40	34	+6	52	
10	Ferro Carril Oeste	38	12	16	10	47	42	+5	52	
11	Unión	38	12	15	11	53	55	−2	51	
12	Talleres (C)	38	11	16	11	45	37	+8	49	
13	Godoy Cruz	38	12	11	15	50	54	−4	47	
14	Racing (C)	38	11	13	14	53	55	−2	46	
15	El Porvenir	38	11	13	14	35	44	−9	46	
16	Chacarita Juniors	38	11	12	15	53	57	−4	45	
17	Juventud Antoniana	38	10	15	13	46	51	−5	45	
18	Defensa y Justicia	38	9	13	16	35	45	−10	40	
19	Defensores de Belgrano	38	11	7	20	41	54	−13	40	
20	Sarmiento (J)	38	7	10	21	45	74	−29	31	

== Promotion playoff ==
This leg was played between the Apertura Winner: Gimnasia y Esgrima de Jujuy (J), and the Clausura Winner: Tiro Federal. The winning team was declared champion and was automatically promoted to 2005–06 Primera División and the losing team played the Second Promotion Playoff.

=== Match details ===
Championship playoff
22 June 2005
First leg

Tiro Federal	1–0	Gimnasia y Esgrima (J)
Yacuzzi 43'	Report 1 Report 2

Estadio Newell's Old Boys, Rosario
Attendance: 12,000
Referee: Pablo Giménez

25 June 2005
Second leg

Gimnasia y Esgrima (J)	1–1	Tiro Federal
Villalba 8'	Report	Gordillo 40'

Estadio 23 de Agosto, Jujuy
Referee: Alejandro Toia

Team details

Gimnasia y Esgrima (J)
Tiro Federal

GK	1	(Argentina) Leonardo Aguirre
DF		(Argentina) Alejandro González	(substituted off) c'
DF		(Argentina) Gabriel Ramón
DF		(Argentina) Fabián Berza
DF		(Argentina) Facundo Torres
MF	8	(Argentina) Marcelo Quinteros
MF		(Argentina) Daniel Ramasco
MF	4	(Argentina) Franco Sosa
MF		(Argentina) Julián Kmet	(substituted off) a'
FW		(Argentina) Gustavo Balvorín	(substituted off) b'
FW		(Argentina) Gabriel Roth
Substitutions:
FW	16	(Paraguay) Aquilino Villalba	(substituted in) a'
		(Argentina) Nelson Agoglia	(substituted in) b'
		(Argentina) Daniel Juárez	(substituted in) c'
Manager:
(Argentina) Roberto Mario Gómez

GK	1	(Argentina) Pablo Del Vecchio
DF	4	(Argentina) Germán Noce
DF		(Argentina) Víctor Molina
DF		(Argentina) Miguel Abrigo
DF	3	(Argentina) Javier Yacuzzi
MF		(Argentina) Diego Romano	(substituted off) b'
MF		(Argentina) Damián Terés	(substituted off) a'
MF		(Argentina) Silvio Iuvalé
MF	10	(Argentina) Raúl Gordillo
FW	11	(Argentina) Javier García	(substituted off) c'
FW	9	(Argentina) Matías Saad	(red card) 86'
Substitutions:
		(Argentina) Pablo Vacaria	(substituted in) a'
		(Argentina) Diego Bono	(substituted in) b'
		(Argentina) Martín Valli	(substituted in) c'
Manager:
(Argentina) José María Bianco

== Second Promotion Playoff ==
This leg was played by Gimnasia y Esgrima (J), the losing team of the Promotion Playoff, and Huracán, who was the best team in the overall standings under the champions. The winning team was promoted to 2005–06 Primera División and the losing team played the Promotion Playoff Primera División-Primera B Nacional.

=== Match details ===
29 June 2005
First leg

Huracán	0–1	Gimnasia y Esgrima (J)
		F. Sosa

Estadio Tomás Ducó, Buenos Aires

2 July 2005
Second leg

Gimnasia y Esgrima (J)	0–0	Huracán
	Report

Estadio 23 de Agosto, Jujuy
Attendance: 20,000
Referee: Jorge Ferro

Team details

Gimnasia y Esgrima (J)
Huracán

GK	Coronel
DF	A. González	(substituted off) 72'
DF	Ramón
DF	Versa
DF	Torres
MF	Quinteros
MF	Ramasco
MF	Maidana
MF	Kmet
FW	Roth	(substituted off) 66'
FW	Villalba	(substituted off) 75'
Substitutes:
	Abaurre	(substituted in) 66'
	Córdoba	(substituted in) 72'
	Juárez	(substituted in) 75'
Manager:
(Argentina) Roberto Mario Gómez

GK	Mariano Andújar
DF	Darío Marra
DF	Matías Villavicencio
DF	Leandro Grimi
MF	Nahuel Fioretto
MF	Mariano Juan
MF	Ignacio Anívole	(substituted off) 71'
MF	Cristian Sánchez Prette
MF	Alejandro Alonso
FW	Daniel Osvaldo	(substituted off) 66'
FW	Joaquín Larrivey
Substitutes:
MF	Roberto Pompei	(substituted in) 63'
FW	Sebastián Cobelli	(substituted in) 66'
FW	Nicolás Hernández	(substituted in) 71'
Manager:
(Argentina) Antonio Mohamed

== Torneo Reducido ==
It was played by the teams placed 4th, 5th, 6th and 7th in the Overall Standings: CAI (4th), Atlético de Rafaela (5th), Nueva Chicago (6th) and San Martín (M) (7th). The winning team played the Promotion Playoff Primera División-Primera B Nacional.

=== Semifinals ===
Team 1	Agg.	Team 2	1st leg	2nd leg
Semifinals
CAI	3–4	San Martín (M)	1–3	2–1
Semifinals
Atlético de Rafaela	2–1	Nueva Chicago	0–0	2–1

=== Final ===
Team 1	Agg.	Team 2	1st leg	2nd leg
Final
Atlético de Rafaela	4–1	San Martín (M)	0–0	4–1

== Promotion playoff Primera División-Primera B Nacional ==
The Second Promotion playoff loser (Huracán) and the Torneo Reducido Winner (Atlético de Rafaela) played against the 18th and the 17th placed of the Relegation Table of 2004–05 Primera División.

Team 1	Agg.	Team 2	1st leg	2nd leg
Relegation/promotion playoff 1
Atlético de Rafaela	2–4	Argentinos Juniors	2–1	0–3
Relegation/promotion playoff 2
Huracán	1–3	Instituto	1–2	0–1

- Argentinos Juniors remains in Primera División after winning the playoff.
- Instituto remains in Primera División after winning the playoff.

== Relegation ==
Pos	Team	2002–03 Pts	2003–04 Pts	2004–05 Pts	Total Pts	Total Pld	Avg	Situation	Affiliation
1	Atlético de Rafaela	77	—	58	135	76	1.776		Indirect
2	Huracán	—	54	61	115	76	1.513		Direct
3	Tiro Federal	—	50	67	113	76	1.487		Indirect
4	Nueva Chicago	—	—	55	55	38	1.447		Direct
5	Gimnasia y Esgrima (J)	48	49	63	164	114	1.439		Indirect
6	Godoy Cruz	58	58	47	163	114	1.43		Indirect
7	Belgrano	52	57	53	162	114	1.421		Indirect
8	Ferro Carril Oeste	—	54	52	106	76	1.395		Direct
9	San Martín (M)	62	42	55	159	114	1.395		Indirect
10	CAI	45	47	61	153	114	1.342		Indirect
11	Unión	—	47	51	98	76	1.289		Direct
12	Talleres (C)	—	—	49	49	38	1.289		Indirect
13	Defensa y Justicia	55	48	40	143	114	1.254		Direct
14	Juventud Antoniana	53	42	45	140	114	1.228		Indirect
15	El Porvenir	42	52	46	140	114	1.228		Direct
16	San Martín (SJ)^{1}	36	50	52	138	114	1.211		Indirect
17	Racing (C) ^{1}	—	—	46	46	38	1.211	Relegation Playoff Matches	Indirect
18	Chacarita Juniors ^{2}	—	—	45	45	38	1.184	Additional Playoff	Direct
19	Defensores de Belgrano ^{2}	49	46	40	135	114	1.184	Additional Playoff	Direct
20	Sarmiento	—	—	31	31	38	0.816	Primera B Metropolitana	Direct

1: Had to play a tiebreaker to see which team played Promotion/relegation Legs.
2: Had to play a tiebreaker to see which team was relegated and which team played Promotion/relegation Legs.

Note: Clubs with indirect affiliation with AFA are relegated to the Torneo Argentino A, while clubs directly affiliated face relegation to Primera B Metropolitana. Clubs with direct affiliation are all from Greater Buenos Aires, with the exception of Newell's, Rosario Central, Central Córdoba and Argentino de Rosario, all from Rosario, and Unión and Colón from Santa Fe.

=== Tiebreaker 1 ===
Since San Martín (SJ) and Racing (C) finished with the same relegation co-efficient at the dividing line, a one-match playoff was held to determine who had to play in the relegation/promotion playoffs. San Martín (SJ) won the playoff so Racing (C) had to play the Relegation Playoff Matches.

Team 1	Score	Team 2
Racing (C)	0–1	San Martín (SJ)

=== Tiebreaker 2 ===
Since Chacarita Juniors and Defensores de Belgrano finished with the same relegation co-efficient at the dividing line, a one-match playoff was held to determine who had to play in the relegation/promotion playoffs and who had to be directly relegated to the Primera B Metropolitana. Chacarita won the match on penalties and continued to the Relegation Playoff Matches; Defensores de Belgrano was relegated to the Primera B Metropolitana.

Team 1	Score	Team 2
Defensores de Belgrano	0–0 (4–5 p)	Chacarita Juniors

== Relegation playoff matches ==
Team 1	Agg.	Team 2	1st leg	2nd leg
Relegation/promotion playoff 1 (Direct affiliation vs. Primera B Metropolitana)
Platense	2–2	Chacarita Juniors	1–1	1–1
Relegation/promotion playoff 2 (Indirect affiliation vs. Torneo Argentino A)
Aldosivi	4–2	Racing (C)	1–0	3–2

- Chacarita Juniors remains in Primera B Nacional after a 2-2 aggregate tie by virtue of a "sports advantage". In case of a tie in goals, the team from the Primera B Nacional gets to stay in it.
- Aldosivi was promoted to 2005–06 Primera B Nacional by winning the playoff and Racing (C) was relegated to 2005–06 Torneo Argentino A.

== See also ==
- 2004–05 in Argentine football
