= Catriel Orcellet =

Argentine footballer

Personal information
- Full name: Catriel Iván Víctor Orcellet
- Date of birth: 10 May 1978 (age 48)
- Place of birth: Villa Elisa, Entre Ríos, Argentina
- Height: 1.88 m (6 ft 2 in)
- Position: Goalkeeper

Youth career
- 1996–98: Boca Juniors

Senior career*
Years	Team	Apps	(Gls)
1998–2002	Gimnasia y Esgrima		
2002–2003	Nueva Chicago		
2003–2004	Real Valladolid	1	(0)
2004–2005	Talleres de Córdoba		
2005–2006	Lanús		
2006–2012	Arsenal	5	(0)
2012–?	Gimnasia y Esgrima	68	(0)
- * Club domestic league appearances and goals

Catriel Iván Víctor Orcellet (born 10 May 1978) is an Argentine former professional footballer who last played as goalkeeper.

== Honours ==
- Copa Sudamericana: 2007
