= Enrique Hrabina =

Argentinean footballer

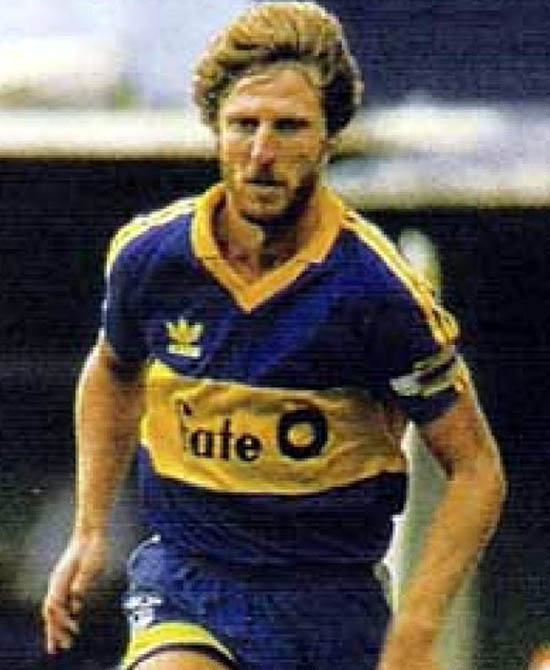

Personal information
- Full name: Enrique Oscar Hrabina
- Date of birth: 9 November 1961 (age 64)
- Place of birth: Argentina
- Position: Defender

Senior career*
Years	Team	Apps	(Gls)
-1983	Club Atlético Atlanta	66	(6)
1983-1984	San Lorenzo de Almagro	48	(0)
1985-1992	Boca Juniors	164	(4)
- * Club domestic league appearances and goals

Enrique Hrabina (born 9 November 1961, in Argentina) is an Argentinean retired footballer.
