= Matías Sánchez (footballer, born 1979) =

Argentine footballer

Personal information
- Full name: Matías Sánchez
- Date of birth: 18 November 1979 (age 46)
- Place of birth: La Plata, Argentina
- Position: Forward

Senior career*
Years	Team	Apps	(Gls)
1996–2002	Cambaceres		
2002–2003	Temperley	30	(5)
2003–2004	Cambaceres		
2004	La Plata	2	(0)
2005–2006	Argentino	20	(8)
2006–2007	Villa San Carlos	31	(7)
2008	Dock Sud	13	(5)
2008	Cañuelas	9	(1)
2010	Sportivo Italiano	1	(0)
2012	Tristán Suárez	7	(1)
2013	General Lamadrid	3	(0)
Total		116	(27)
- * Club domestic league appearances and goals

Matías Sánchez (born 18 November 1979) is an Argentine former professional footballer who played as a forward.

== Career ==
Sánchez spent the first years of his senior career with Cambaceres in Primera C Metropolitana, playing twenty-seven times and scoring once between 1996 and 1999. The club won promotion in 1998–99 to Primera B Metropolitana. He had two spells with Cambaceres in the division, either side of a short spell with fellow Primera B Metropolitana side Temperley with whom he scored five goals in thirty professional matches for. In 2004, Sánchez left Cambaceres after over one hundred appearances to join La Plata of Torneo Argentino B. After La Plata, Sánchez had spells with Argentino, Villa San Carlos, Dock Sud and Cañuelas.

After two years without a team, Sánchez signed for Sportivo Italiano of Primera B Nacional in 2010. He played just once for the club, versus CAI on 6 February, before departing. He ended his career with appearances for Tristán Suárez and General Lamadrid.

== Honours ==
Cambaceres

- Primera C Metropolitana: 1998–99
