= Ariel Agüero =

Argentine footballer (born 1980)

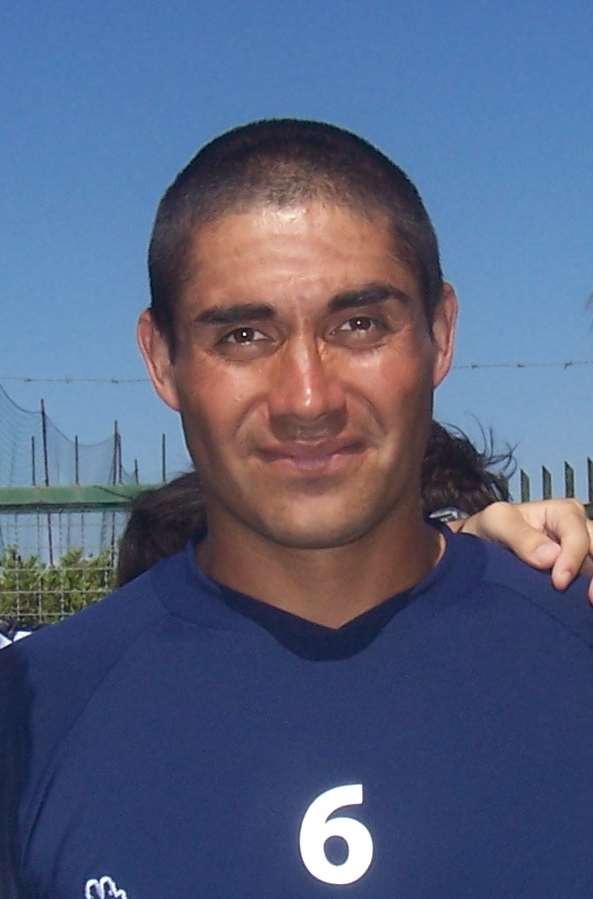

Personal information
- Full name: Antonio Ariel Agüero
- Date of birth: August 18, 1980 (age 46)
- Place of birth: Albardón, San Juan, Argentina
- Height: 1.88 m (6 ft 2 in)
- Position: Centre back

Senior career*
Years	Team	Apps	(Gls)
2002–2003	Independiente Villa Obrera	12	(1)
2003–2004	San Martín SJ	13	(0)
2004–2005	Juventud Alianza	22	(1)
2005–2008	San Martín SJ	99	(2)
2008–2011	Gimnasia LP	104	(5)
2011–2012	Quilmes	27	(0)
2012–2017	Independiente Rivadavia	140	(4)
2017–2018	Sportivo Desamparados	19	(1)
- * Club domestic league appearances and goals

Antonio Ariel Agüero (born 18 August 1980) is a football centre back.
