= UD San Pedro =

Spanish football club from Andalusia

San Pedro
- Full name: Unión Deportiva San Pedro
- Founded: 1974
- Ground: Municipal; San Pedro Alcántara, Marbella, Spain
- Capacity: 2,500
- Chairman: Oscar Escobar Arenas
- Manager: Adrián Cervera García
- League: Tercera Federación – Group 9
- 2025–26: Tercera Federación – Group 9, 8th of 18
- Website: http://www.udsanpedro.com/
Home colours	Away colours

Unión Deportiva San Pedro is a Spanish football team based in San Pedro Alcántara, Marbella, in the autonomous community of Andalusia. Founded in 1974, it plays in Tercera Federación – Group 9, holding home matches at Estadio Municipal de San Pedro Alcántara, with a 5,000-seat capacity.

== Season to season ==
Season	Tier	Division	Place	Copa del Rey
1974–1976	—	Regional	—	
1976–77	5	1ª Reg.	4th	
1977–78	5	Reg. Pref.	2nd	
1978–79	5	Reg. Pref.	1st	
1979–80	4	3ª	5th	First round
1980–81	4	3ª	7th	Second round
1981–82	4	3ª	11th	
1982–83	4	3ª	15th	
1983–84	4	3ª	3rd	
1984–85	4	3ª	16th	First round
1985–86	5	Reg. Pref.	1st	
1986–87	4	3ª	8th	
1987–88	4	3ª	11th	
1988–89	4	3ª	16th	
1989–90	4	3ª	19th	
1990–91	5	Reg. Pref.	2nd	
1991–92	4	3ª	12th	
1992–93	4	3ª	17th	
1993–94	4	3ª	11th	
1994–95	4	3ª	2nd	

Season	Tier	Division	Place	Copa del Rey
1995–96	3	2ª B	15th	First round
1996–97	3	2ª B	13th	
1997–98	3	2ª B	18th	
1998–99	4	3ª	7th	
1999–2000	4	3ª	11th	
2000–01	4	3ª	14th	
2001–02	4	3ª	18th	
2002–03	5	Reg. Pref.	2nd	
2003–04	4	3ª	18th	
2004–05	5	1ª And.	9th	
2005–06	5	1ª And.	15th	
2006–07	6	Reg. Pref.	10th	
2007–08	6	Reg. Pref.	4th	
2008–09	6	Reg. Pref.	2nd	
2009–10	5	1ª And.	4th	
2010–11	5	1ª And.	1st	
2011–12	4	3ª	8th	
2012–13	4	3ª	13th	
2013–14	4	3ª	14th	
2014–15	4	3ª	3rd	

Season	Tier	Division	Place	Copa del Rey
2015–16	4	3ª	11th	
2016–17	4	3ª	11th	
2017–18	4	3ª	17th	
2018–19	4	3ª	20th	
2019–20	5	Div. Hon.	8th	
2020–21	5	Div. Hon.	2nd	
2021–22	5	3ª RFEF	15th	
2022–23	6	Div. Hon.	7th	
2023–24	6	Div. Hon.	4th	
2024–25	6	Div. Hon.	3rd	First round
2025–26	5	3ª Fed.	8th	
2026–27	5	3ª Fed.		

- 3 seasons in Segunda División B
- 23 seasons in Tercera División
- 3 seasons in Tercera Federación/Tercera División RFEF
