= Estadio Ingeniero Hilario Sánchez =

Football stadium in San Juan, Argentina

Coordinates: 31°31′11″S 68°31′49″W

Hilario Sánchez Stadium
- Estadio Hilario Sánchez
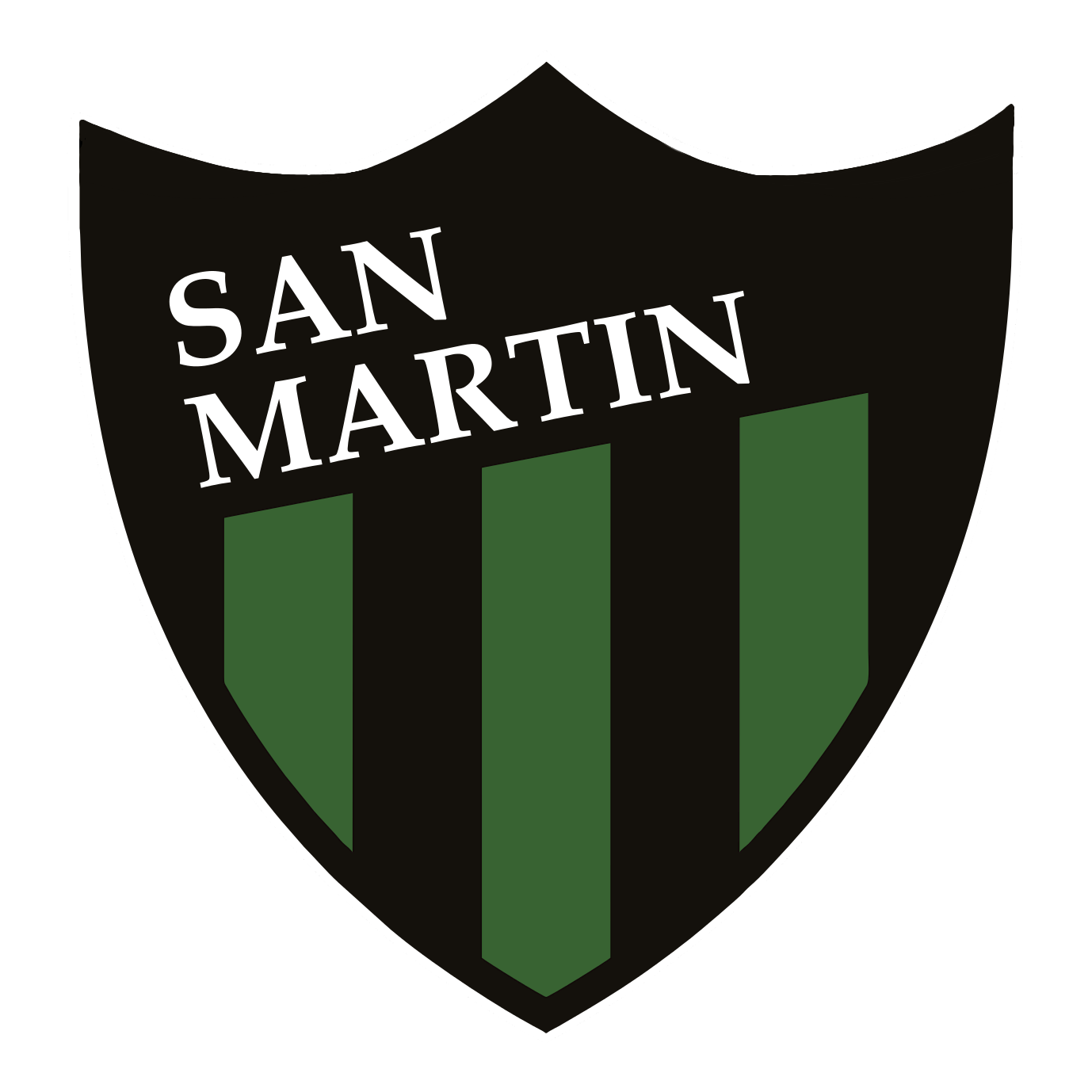

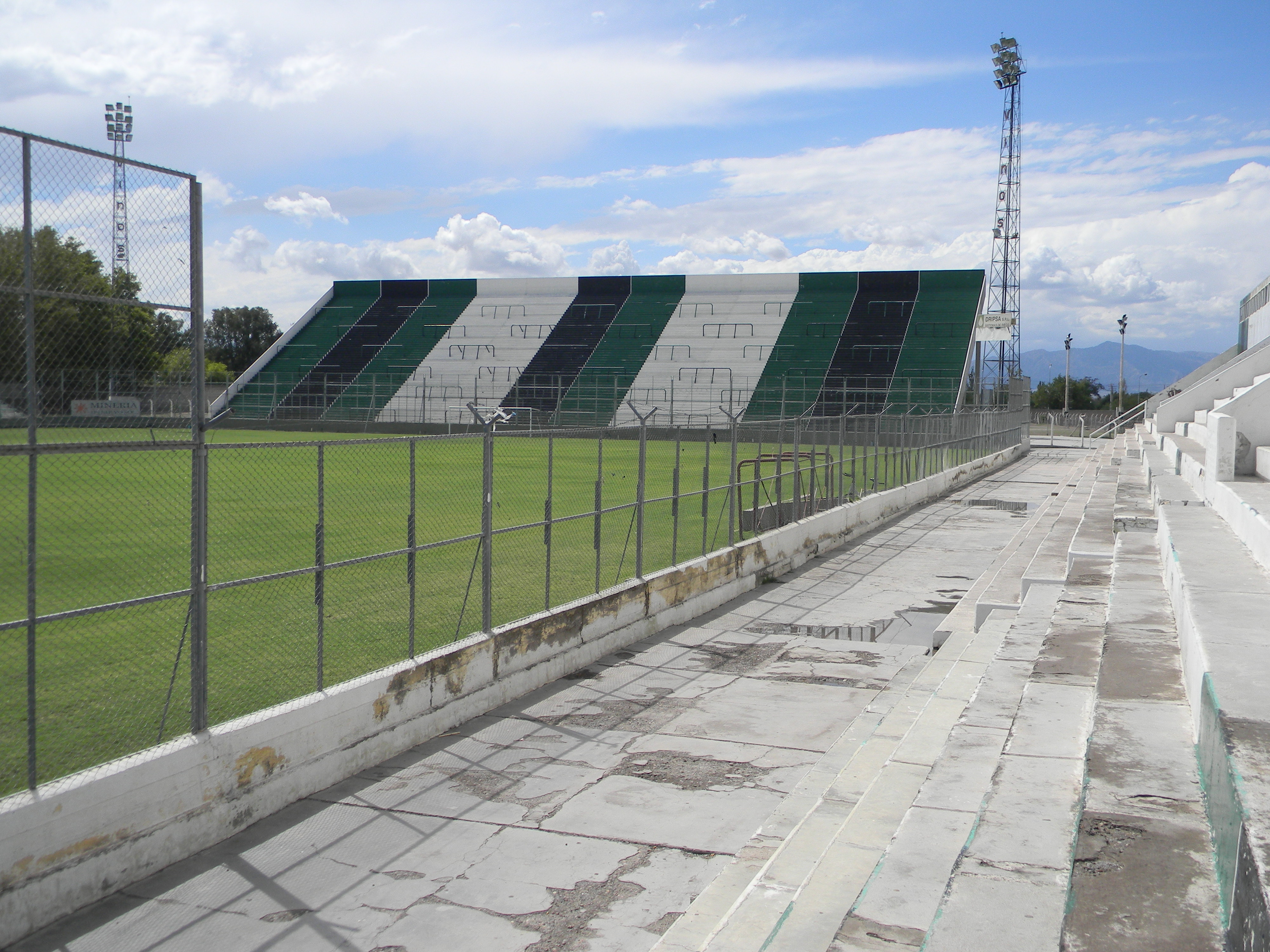
- Interactive map of Hilario Sánchez Stadium
- Full name: Estadio Ingeniero Hilario Sánchez
- Former names: Estadio 27 de Septiembre (1995–2006)
- Address: Mendoza 1100; San Juan; Argentina
- Owner: C.A. San Martín
- Capacity: 26,500
- Surface: Grass
- Field size: 105 x 75 m

Construction
- Opened: 9 September 1951; 75 years ago
- Renovated: 2007

Tenant
- San Martín

Estadio Ingeniero Hilario Sánchez is a football stadium in the city of San Juan in Argentina. It is owned and operated by C.A. San Martín. With a capacity of 26,500 spectators, it is the second biggest stadium in San Juan Province after Estadio del Bicentenario.

The stadium was named after engineer Hilario Sánchez Rodríguez (1925–1987), former goalkeeper and then president of San Martín (1971–1983), regarded as one of the most prominent executives of the club.

== Overview ==
The stadium was inaugurated on Monday, 9 July 1951 in a friendly match between San Martín and Independiente Rivadavia. San Martín won 3–1. During the presidency of Hilario Sánchez, the club added a lighting system to the stadium, and built new concrete grandstands which replaced the old wooden stands.

Six months after the passing of Sánchez (29 May 1987), the Executive Committee (leaded by Miguel Sánchez, Hilario's brother) decided to name the stadium after him. Nevertheless, it would be changed to "Estadio 27 de Septiembre" (to commemorate the date of foundation of San Martín) in 1995. Nevertheless, the stadium returned to the "Hilario Sánchez" name in 2006.

The venue was renovated in 2007 because San Martín had promoted to Primera División after defeating Huracán in the 2007 promotion playoff. and the stadium needed a bigger capacity to host matches in the top-division league. Therefore a new grandstand for 14,000 people was built and the stadium increased its capacity. Works included construction of new press booths.

== Notable matches ==
One of the San Martín's most outstandings achievements playing in Hilario Sánchez stadium occurred on 13 April 2013, when the squad beat Boca Juniors 6–1, with goals scored by Humberto Osorio (3), Jorge Luna, Lucas Landa, and Sebastián Penco.

The stadium hosted a Argentina national team match, when the squad then coached by Diego Maradona played a friendly game vs Costa Rica, on 26 January 2010. Argentina won 3–2, with an attendance of 16,000. It was the second time Argentina played a match in San Juan.
