= Fortín de Ludueña =

Football stadium in Rosario, Argentina

Ludueña Stadium
- Estadio Ludueña
- Fortín
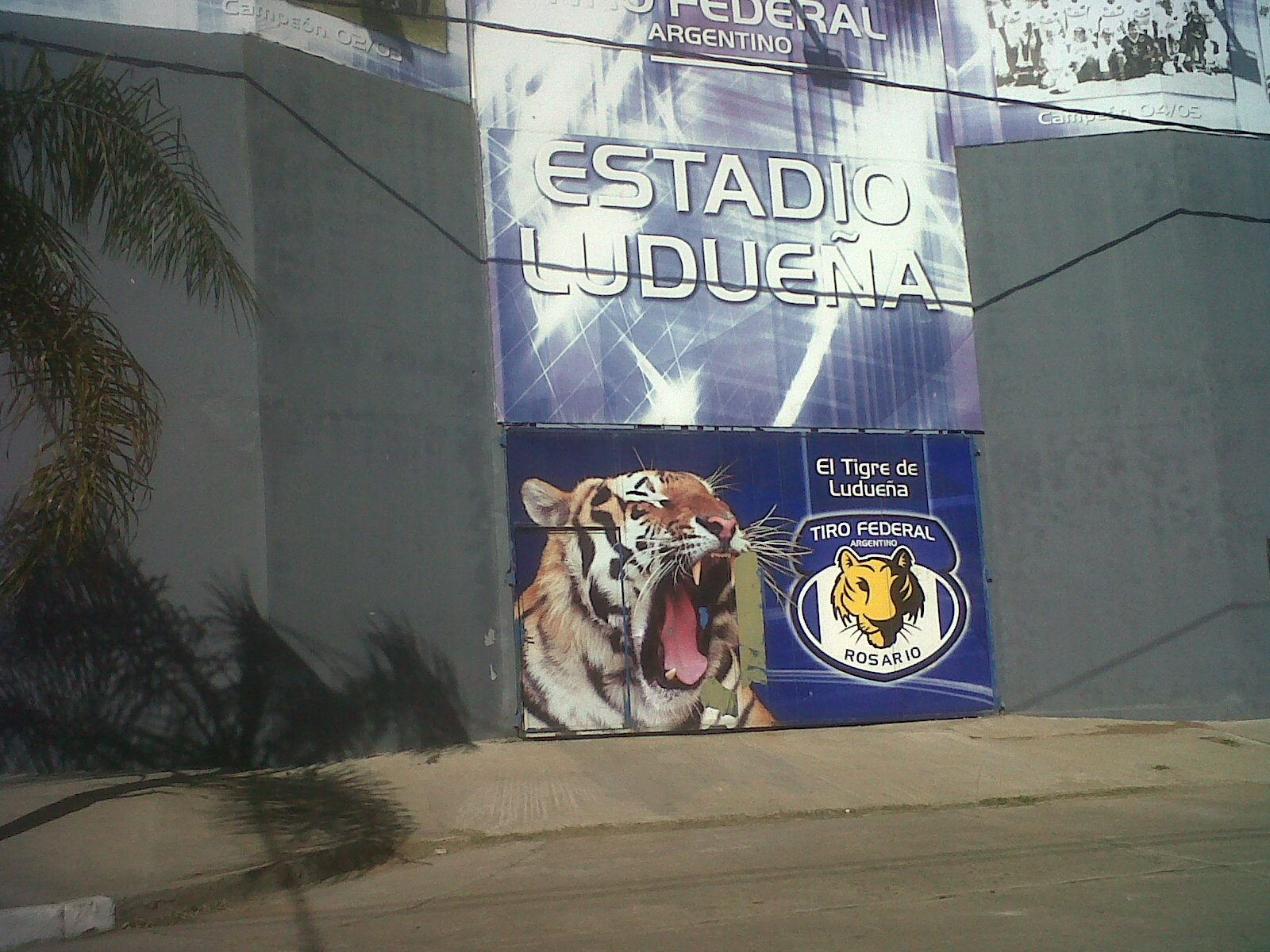
- Plotted entrance to the stadium, 2013
- Interactive map of Ludueña Stadium
- Address: Casilda y Matienzo; Rosario, Santa Fe; Argentina
- Owner: C.A. Tiro Federal Argentino
- Capacity: 10,000
- Type: Stadium
- Surface: Grass
- Field size: 105 x 68 m

Construction
- Opened: 1956; 70 years ago
- Renovated: 2001
- Expanded: 2001

Tenant
- Tiro Federal (1956–present)

Estadio Ludueña (mostly known for its nickname Fortín de Ludueña) is a football stadium located in the city of Rosario of Santa Fe Province, Argentina. The stadium is owned and operated by C.A. Tiro Federal Argentino. It has a capacity of 10,000 spectators and was inaugurated in 1956.

== History ==
The first Tiro Federal venue was located on Humberto Primo and Goosweiler streets. The team played there since their foundation in 1905 until 1926, when the club acquired a land on Vèlez Sarsfield and Iguazú streets in the Barrio Industrial, where a new stadium was built. It was close to Club Argentino's venue. While works were in progress, Tiro Federal used other venues such as Gimnasia y Esgrima stadium in Parque Independencia. The Barrio Industrial venue was inaugurated in 1929.

In 1935 Tiro Federal moved to another land on Boulevard 27 de Febrero and Moreno streets, popularly known as "cancha del tanque" due to its proximity with a water tank that was part of a Obras Sanitarias de la Nación plant. On March 4, 1954, the Executive Committee agreed with club members to buy a land in Barrio Ludueña, where a new stadium would be built. The land was located on Casilda and Matienzo streets.

After Tiro Federal promoted to the regionalised Torneo Argentino B in 1998, the team had to play their home matches in other stadiums due to the low capacity and deterioration of their own venue. Stadiums used were Estadio Gabino Sosa (Central Córdoba) and Estadio José María Olaeta (Argentino de Rosario), and Estadio Gigante de Arroyito, which were their home venues during the 1998–99 season.

The stadium was finally refurbished during 2001. Works included the replacements of the old wooden stand (the only by then) for concrete blocks mounted on iron structures. Besides, three new stands were built on the other sides of the stadium. Press booths, toilettes, locker rooms, were also renovated and modernised, while a fence was placed surrounding the pitch. On 9 December 2001 the stadium was reinaugurated in a Torneo Argentino A match vs San Martín de Tucumán (ended 2–2).

As big doors were placed outside the Ludueña Stadium, it was soon nicknamed Fortín due to its similarity with a fortification.
