= Tiro Federal =

Association football club in Argentina

- Full name: Club Atlético Tiro Federal Argentino
- Nickname(s): Tigres; Tirolenses
- Founded: 29 March 1905; 120 years ago
- Ground: Fortín de Ludueña, Rosario, Santa Fe
- Capacity: 18,000
- Chairman: Carlos Dávola
- Manager: Osvaldo Bernasconi
- League: Torneo Federal B (none)
- 2015: 20° (Relegated)
Home colours	Away colours

Club Atlético Tiro Federal Argentino (mostly known just as Tiro Federal or Tiro Federal de Rosario) is an Argentine football club from the city of Rosario, in Santa Fe Province. The team currently plays in Torneo Argentino A, the third division of the Argentine football league system.

== History ==
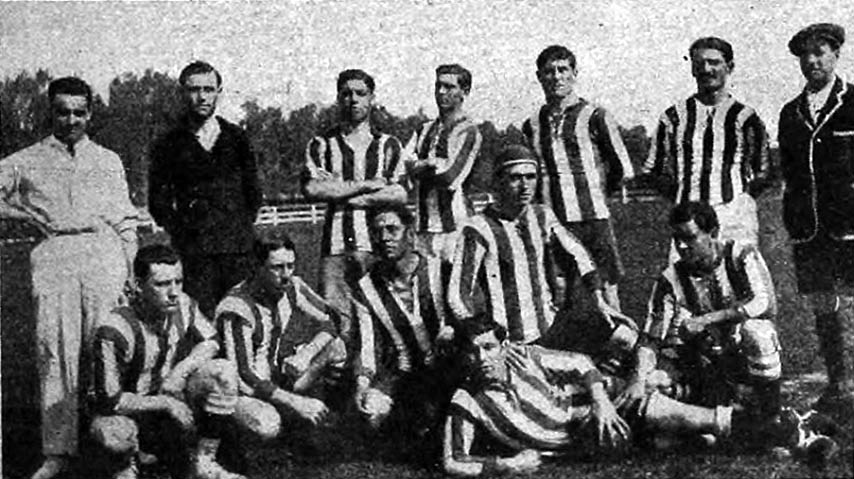
The team of 1915 reached the Copa de Honor final v. Racing Club

Founded on March 29, 1905, Tiro Federal was member of Liga Rosarina de Football (LRF), winning the league's "Copa Nicasio Vila" in 1920, 1925 and 1926. As an LRF member, Tiro Federal took part in tournaments organised by the Argentine Football Association such as Copa de Honor Municipalidad de Buenos Aires, playing the final in 1915 although they lost to Racing Club.

In 1944 (13 years after the professionalization of the game in Argentina) Tiro Federal affiliated with the AFA, where the team competed in the second division. It was relegated to the third division after a restructure of the national leagues in 1949. In 1962 Tiro Federal withdrew its team 12 rounds before the end of competition and was expelled from the AFA. Tiro then returned to play in the Rosario league, but financial problems made the club leave the league.

Businessman Carlos Dávola took over the management of the club at the end the 1990s and launched a comeback plan. In 1997 Tiro won the local second division, then the first division in 1999, 2000 and 2001. At the same time it participated in Torneo Argentino B (the regionalized fourth division) in the 1998–99 season, finishing in second place and winning promotion to Torneo Argentino A.

After winning the 2003 Clausura tournament of Torneo Argentino A, Tiro Federal was promoted to Primera B Nacional, the second division of Argentina. In 2004–05 Tiro Federal won the championship, advancing for the first time to the highest level, Primera División.

In the first tournament in the First Division in 2005, Tiro Federal finished 19th out of 20 teams. However, one of its players, Javier Cámpora, was the top scorer of the tournament. On April 8, 2006, Tiro Federal was relegated to Primera B Nacional, the second division of Argentine football.

At the end of 2010–11 season, after spending four years in the second division, Tiro Federal was relegated to Torneo Argentino A, the regionalized third division in Argentina.

== Stadium ==
Tiro Federal's stadium is located in the Ludueña neighborhood of Rosario. Known as El Fortín de Ludueña (Ludueña's Fortress), the stadium doesn't meet requirements for first division matches. The team currently plays at the Club Real Arroyo Seco's stadium in the nearby city of Arroyo Seco, and for especially important matches, at Newell's Old Boys' stadium.

== Current squad ==
As of July 30, 2015.

Note: Flags indicate national team as defined under FIFA eligibility rules; some limited exceptions apply. Players may hold more than one non-FIFA nationality.

No.	Pos.	Nation	Player
—	GK	ARG	Alejandro Dianda
—	GK	ARG	Ludovico Paulucci
—	DF	ARG	Bruno Caballero
—	DF	ARG	Alberto Cabrera
—	DF	ARG	Brian Carabajal
—	DF	ARG	Diego Chitzoff
—	DF	ARG	Diego Diaz
—	DF	ARG	Carlos Fondacaro
—	DF	ARG	Matias Gogna
—	DF	ARG	Fernando Moreyra
—	DF	ARG	Franco Tordini
—	MF	ARG	Elias Cantero
—	MF	ARG	Alejandro Cascio
—	MF	ARG	Sergio Espindola
—	MF	ARG	Matias Ferrari

No.	Pos.	Nation	Player
—	MF	ARG	Victoriano Fragola
—	MF	ARG	Gabriel Killer
—	MF	ARG	German Medina
—	MF	ARG	Diego Migueles
—	MF	ARG	Bruno Milanesio
—	MF	ARG	Oscar Ramirez
—	MF	ARG	Jorge Rojas
—	MF	ARG	German Tarnavassa
—	FW	ARG	Guido Carloni
—	FW	ARG	Leandro Depetris
—	FW	ARG	Eduardo Labria
—	FW	ARG	Lulas Lopez
—	FW	ARG	Daniel Salvatierra
—	FW	ARG	Cristian Tarragona

== Honours ==
=== National ===
==== League ====
- Primera B Nacional (1): 2004–05
- Torneo Argentino A (1): 2002–03
- Primera C (1): 1951

==== National cups ====
- Copa Ibarguren (1): 1920

=== Regional ===
- Asociación Rosarina de Fútbol
  - Primera División (4): 1998, 1999, 2000, 2001
  - Segunda División (1): 1997
  - Torneo Preparación (1): 2004
- Copa Nicasio Vila (3): 1920, 1925, 1926
- Copa Damas de Caridad (1): 1911
- Copa Estímulo (1): 1927
- Tercera División Copa El Comercio (5): 1908, 1918, 1919, 1929, 1930
