= 2016–17 Copa Argentina =

Tournament details
- Country: Argentina
- Teams: 99

Final positions
- Champions: River Plate (2nd title)
- Runners-up: Atlético Tucumán
- 2018 Copa Libertadores: Atlético Tucumán

Tournament statistics
- Matches played: 133
- Goals scored: 344 (2.59 per match)
- Top goal scorer: Maximiliano Tunessi (7 goals)

Awards
- Best player: Ignacio Scocco

The 2016–17 Copa Argentina (officially the Copa Total Argentina 2016-17 for sponsorship reasons) was the eighth edition of the Copa Argentina, and the sixth since the relaunch of the tournament in 2011. The competition began on February 2 and ended on December 9, 2017.

River Plate, the defending champions, defeated Atlético Tucumán 2–1 in the final to win their 2nd title. As champions, River Plate qualified for the 2017 Supercopa Argentina.

Atlético Tucumán, as runners-up, qualified for the 2018 Copa Libertadores because River Plate had already qualified as Primera División runners-up.

== Teams ==
The 99 teams that took part in this competition included: All teams from the Primera División (30); twelve teams of the Primera B Nacional; five from the Primera B, four from the Primera C; two from the Primera D; fourteen teams from Federal A and thirty-two from Federal B.

=== First Level ===
==== Primera División ====
All thirty teams qualified.

- Aldosivi
- Arsenal
- Atlético de Rafaela
- Atlético Tucumán
- Banfield
- Belgrano
- Boca Juniors
- Colón
- Defensa y Justicia
- Estudiantes (LP)
- Gimnasia y Esgrima (LP)
- Godoy Cruz
- Huracán
- Independiente
- Lanús
- Newell's Old Boys
- Olimpo
- Patronato
- Quilmes
- Racing
- River Plate^{TH}
- Rosario Central
- San Lorenzo
- San Martín (SJ)
- Sarmiento (J)
- Talleres (C)
- Temperley
- Tigre
- Unión
- Vélez Sarsfield

=== Second Level ===
The first twelve teams from the first stage of 2016-17 tournament qualified.

==== Primera B Nacional ====
- All Boys
- Almagro
- Argentinos Juniors
- Brown
- Central Córdoba (SdE)
- Chacarita Juniors
- Ferro Carril Oeste
- Guillermo Brown
- Independiente Rivadavia
- Instituto
- Nueva Chicago
- Santamarina

=== Third Level ===
==== Primera B Metropolitana ====
The first five teams from the first stage of 2016-17 Primera B tournament qualified.

- Atlanta
- Defensores de Belgrano
- Deportivo Morón
- Deportivo Riestra
- Estudiantes (BA)

==== Torneo Federal A ====
The first two teams of each zone of the 2016–17 tournament qualified.

- Altos Hornos Zapla
- Alvarado
- Chaco For Ever
- Cipolletti
- Defensores de Belgrano (VR)
- Deportivo Madryn
- Gimnasia y Esgrima (M)
- Gimnasia y Tiro
- Mitre (SdE)
- Sarmiento (R)
- Sportivo Las Parejas
- Unión Aconquija
- Unión (S)
- Unión (VK)

=== Fourth Level ===
==== Primera C Metropolitana ====
The first four teams from the first stage of 2016-17 Primera C tournament qualified.

- Cañuelas
- Defensores Unidos
- Sacachispas
- Sportivo Barracas

==== Torneo Federal B ====
The first two teams of each zone of the 2016-17 Federal B tournament qualified.

- Almirante Brown (L)
- Argentinos (VdM)
- Atlético Laguna Blanca
- Belgrano (P)
- Belgrano (SN)
- Bella Vista (BB)
- Ben Hur
- Central Norte
- Colón Juniors
- Comercio Central Unidos
- Deportivo Achirense
- Deportivo Camioneros
- Estudiantes (RC)
- Ferroviario (C)
- Germinal
- Güemes (SdE)
- Huracán (CR)
- Huracán Las Heras
- Independiente (Ch)
- Jorge Newbery (CR)
- Kimberley
- Mitre (S)
- Pacífico
- San Martín (F)
- Sansinena
- Sol de Mayo
- Sportivo Barracas (C)
- Sportivo Peñarol (Ch)
- Talleres (P)
- Textil Mandiyú
- Tiro Federal (M)
- Tiro Federal (R)

=== Fifth Level ===
==== Primera D Metropolitana ====
The first two teams from the first stage of 2016-17 Primera D tournament qualified.

- Atlas
- Leandro N. Alem

== Regional Round ==
This round is organized by the Consejo Federal.

=== Group A: Federal A ===
In this round, 14 teams from the Torneo Federal A participated. The round was played between March 14 and 30, on a home-and-away two-legged tie. The 7 winning teams advanced to the Final Round.

Team 1	Agg.	Team 2	1st leg	2nd leg
Cipolletti	3–3 (4–2 p)	Deportivo Madryn	2–1	1–2
Defensores de Belgrano (VR)	4–2	Alvarado	3–1	1–1
Altos Hornos Zapla	1–6	Gimnasia y Tiro	0–3	1–3
Sportivo Las Parejas	8–1	Unión (S)	5–1	3–0
Chaco For Ever	3–2	Sarmiento (R)	2–0	1–2
Unión Aconquija	2–4	Mitre (SdE)	1–1	1–3
Unión (VK)	2–3	Gimnasia y Esgrima (M)	1–0	1–3

==== First leg ====
March 14, 2017	Cipolletti	2–1	Deportivo Madryn	Cipolletti, Pcia. de Río Negro
21:30	Lamolla 19' (pen.); Opazo 65'	Report	Piñero da Silva 68'	Stadium: La Visera de Cemento; Referee: Sergio Testa

March 14, 2017	Defensores de Belgrano (VR)	3–1	Alvarado	Villa Ramallo, Pcia. de Buenos Aires
21:00	Nouet 9' (pen.); Torrent 55', 75'	Report	Compagnucci 73'	Stadium: Salomón Boeseldín; Referee: Nahuel Viñas

March 14, 2017	Altos Hornos Zapla	0–3	Gimnasia y Tiro	Palpalá, Pcia. de Jujuy
22:00		Report	Amieva 44', 52'; Aguirre 45+13'	Stadium: Emilio Fabrizzi; Referee: Francisco Acosta

March 14, 2017	Sportivo Las Parejas	5–1	Unión (S)	Las Parejas, Pcia. de Santa Fe
21:00	Jourdan 24', 34'; Comachi 55'; Rodríguez 58'; Fernández 88'	Report	Salvatierra 69'	Stadium: Fortaleza del Lobo; Referee: Sebastián Ranciglio

March 14, 2017	Chaco For Ever	2–0	Sarmiento (R)	Resistencia, Pcia. de Chaco
22:00	Cabrera 17'; Magno 75'	Report		Stadium: Juan Alberto García; Referee: Guillermo González

March 26, 2017	Unión Aconquija	1–1	Mitre (SdE)	Aconquija, Pcia. de Catamarca
16:00	Fabello 63'	Report	Quinteros 30'	Stadium: Municipal de Aconquija; Referee: Luis Medina Lobo

March 14, 2017	Unión (VK)	1–0	Gimnasia y Esgrima (M)	San Juan, Pcia. de San Juan
17:00	González 46'	Report		Stadium: San Juan del Bicentenario; Referee: Fabricio Llobet

==== Second leg ====
March 22, 2017	Deportivo Madryn	2–1 (3–3 agg.) (2–4 p)	Cipolletti	Puerto Madryn, Pcia. de Chubut
16:00	Ávila 60' (o.g.); Firpo 64'	Report	Opazo 19'	Stadium: Coliseo del Golfo; Referee: Bruno Bocca
	Penalties
	Michelena (penalty scored); Ibarlucea (penalty missed); Carou (penalty scored); Asprilla (penalty missed)		(penalty scored) Lamolla; (penalty scored) Vilce; (penalty scored) Valente; (penalty scored) Mellado

March 22, 2017	Alvarado	1–1 (2–4 agg.)	Defensores de Belgrano (VR)	Mar del Plata, Pcia. de Buenos Aires
20:30	Albarracín 54' (pen.)	Report	Castro 40' (pen.)	Stadium: José María Minella; Referee: Adrián Franklin

March 22, 2017	Gimnasia y Tiro	3–1 (6–1 agg.)	Altos Hornos Zapla	Salta, Pcia. de Salta
22:00	Bellone 32'; Carrasco 58'; Sanfilippo 89'	Report	Abello 76'	Stadium: El Gigante del Norte; Referee: Sebastián Ranciglio

March 22, 2017	Unión (S)	0–3 (1–8 agg.)	Sportivo Las Parejas	Sunchales, Pcia. de Santa Fe
21:00		Report	Gallardo 35'; Bocchietti 86', 88'	Stadium: La Fortaleza; Referee: Jorge Nelson

March 22, 2017	Sarmiento (R)	2–1 (2–3 agg.)	Chaco For Ever	Resistencia, Pcia. de Chaco
21:30	Gauto 45+1', 68'	Report	Rolheiser 69'	Stadium: Centenario; Referee: Nazareno Arasa

April 19, 2017	Mitre (SdE)	3–1 (4–2 agg.)	Unión Aconquija	Santiago del Estero, Pcia. de Santiago del Estero
16:00	Durán 3'; Villafañe 13'; Camisay 85'	Report	Cortez 27'	Stadium: Doctores José y Antonio Castiglione; Referee: Carlos Córdoba

April 5, 2017	Gimnasia y Esgrima (M)	3–1 (3–2 agg.)	Unión (VK)	Mendoza, Pcia. de Mendoza
21:00	Navarro 3'; Corvalán 47'; Albornoz 66'	Report	García 90'	Stadium: Víctor Antonio Legrotaglie; Referee: Luis Medina Lobo

=== Group B: Federal B ===
==== Round I ====
In this first round, 32 teams from the Torneo Federal B participated. The round was played between February 2 and February 23, on a home-and-away two-legged tie. The 16 winning teams advanced to the Round II.

Team 1	Agg.	Team 2	1st leg	2nd leg
Jorge Newbery (CR)	1–1 (a)	Huracán (CR)	0–0	1–1
Germinal	2–3	Sol de Mayo	2–1	0–2
Bella Vista (BB)	11–1	Sansinena	6–0	5–1
Kimberley	4–3	Argentinos (VdM)	2–2	2–1
Güemes (SdE)	2–2 (a)	Comercio Central Unidos	1–0	1–2
Tiro Federal (M)	1–5	Estudiantes (RC)	1–0	0–5
Pacífico	4–1	Huracán Las Heras	0–0	4–1
Sportivo Peñarol (Ch)	6–2	Colón Juniors	2–1	4–1
Independiente (Ch)	1–2	Deportivo Camioneros	0–1	1–1
Sportivo Barracas (C)	4–0	Belgrano (SN)	3–0	1–0
Belgrano (P)	2–0	Deportivo Achirense	1–0	1–0
Ben Hur	3–0	Tiro Federal (R)	1–0	2–0
Mitre (S)	1–2	Central Norte	1–2	0–0
Almirante Brown (L)	2–4	Talleres (P)	1–2	1–2
Atlético Laguna Blanca	2–5	San Martín (F)	1–2	1–3
Ferroviario (C)	4–3	Textil Mandiyú	3–1	1–2

===== First leg =====
February 4, 2017	Jorge Newbery (CR)	0–0	Huracán (CR)	Comodoro Rivadavia, Pcia. de Chubut
18:00		Report		Stadium: Municipal de Comodoro Rivadavia; Referee: Alejandro Sepúlveda

February 4, 2017	Germinal	2–1	Sol de Mayo	Rawson, Pcia. de Chubut
17:00	Biss 9'; Sosa 90+1' (pen.)	Report	Valdebenito 83' (pen.)	Stadium: El Fortín; Referee: Luciano Julio

February 4, 2017	Bella Vista (BB)	6–0	Sansinena	Bahía Blanca, Pcia. de Buenos Aires
17:00	Bellegia 51', 81'; González 57' (pen.); Ovando 60'; Ianni 62'; Martínez 79'	Report		Stadium: Ignacio Nicolás; Referee: Fernando Marcos

February 8, 2017	Argentinos (VdM)	2–2	Kimberley	Veinticinco de Mayo, Pcia. de Buenos Aires
20:30	Rivarola 9'; Lopardo 53'	Report	Barreiro 51', 54'	Stadium: Club Atlético Argentinos; Referee: Claudio Elichiri

February 4, 2017	Güemes (SdE)	1–0	Comercio Central Unidos	Santiago del Estero, Pcia. de Santiago del Estero
22:00	Olivera 8'	Report		Stadium: Arturo Miranda; Referee: Emilio Maguna

February 3, 2017	Tiro Federal (M)	1–0	Estudiantes (RC)	Morteros, Pcia. de Córdoba
21:00	Raballo 13'	Report		Stadium: Bautista Monetti; Referee: Carlos Gariano

February 2, 2017	Pacífico	0–0	Huracán Las Heras	General Alvear, Pcia. de Mendoza
19:00		Report		Stadium: El Gigante de Cemento; Referee: Hernán Mostaccio

February 3, 2017	Sportivo Peñarol (Ch)	2–1	Colón Juniors	Chimbas, Pcia. de San Juan
22:00	Chávez 10'; Brizuela 84' (pen.)	Report	Jofré 74'	Stadium: Ramón Pablo Rojas; Referee: Sebastián Fernández

February 4, 2017	Independiente (Ch)	0–1	Deportivo Camioneros	Chivilcoy, Pcia. de Buenos Aires
17:00		Report	González 13'	Stadium: Raúl Orlando Lungarzo; Referee: Bruno Amiconi

February 4, 2017	Sportivo Barracas (C)	3–0	Belgrano (SN)	Colón, Pcia. de Buenos Aires
18:00	Villán 45+1' (pen.); Bellegia 69', 90+4'	Report		Stadium: Roberto Tito Perez; Referee: Alejo Cid

February 4, 2017	Belgrano (P)	1–0	Deportivo Achirense	Paraná, Pcia. de Entre Ríos
17:00	Vergara 15' (pen.)	Report		Stadium: Nuevo Mondonguero; Referee: Walter Báez

February 4, 2017	Ben Hur	1–0	Tiro Federal (R)	Rafaela, Pcia. de Santa Fe
20:00	Izaguirre 88'	Report		Stadium: Parque Barrio Ilolay; Referee: Leandro Bottoni

February 4, 2017	Mitre (S)	1–2	Central Norte	Salta, Pcia. de Salta
21:00	Chiaraviglio 80'	Report	Puntano 58'; Armella 79'	Stadium: Miguel Pascual Soler; Referee: Gustavo Gómez

February 4, 2017	Almirante Brown (L)	1–2	Talleres (P)	Lules, Pcia. de Tucumán
17:00	Rodríguez 65'	Report	López 28'; Palenque 51'	Stadium: Almirante Brown; Referee: Guillermo Infante

February 4, 2017	Atlético Laguna Blanca	1–2	San Martín (F)	Laguna Blanca, Pcia. de Formosa
17:45	Duarte 49'	Report	Velázquez 40'; Sosa 47'	Stadium: Laguna Blanca; Referee: Milton Van Lierde

February 4, 2017	Ferroviario (C)	3–1	Textil Mandiyú	Corrientes, Pcia. de Corrientes
17:30	Brunetti 41'; Barreto 52' (pen.); Ibáñez 54'	Report	Monzón 35'	Stadium: José Antonio Romero Feris; Referee: Victor Vallejos

===== Second leg =====
February 23, 2017	Huracán (CR)	1–1 (1–1 agg.)	Jorge Newbery (CR)	Comodoro Rivadavia, Pcia. de Chubut
17:00	Bustos 16' (pen.)	Report	Castro 2'	Stadium: César Muñoz; Referee: Raúl Pagani

February 11, 2017	Sol de Mayo	2–0 (3–2 agg.)	Germinal	Viedma, Pcia. de Río Negro
17:00	Tunessi 2'; García 15'	Report		Stadium: Sol de Mayo; Referee: Pablo Leguizamón

February 11, 2017	Sansinena	1–5 (1–11 agg.)	Bella Vista (BB)	General Daniel Cerri, Pcia. de Buenos Aires
17:00	Stortini 43'	Report	Ihitz 23'; Bartoletti 39'; González 41'; Bellegia 55'; Siamparelli 65'	Stadium: Luis Molina; Referee: Rafael Di Lorenzo

February 12, 2017	Kimberley	2–1 (4–3 agg.)	Argentinos (VdM)	Mar del Plata, Pcia. de Buenos Aires
17:00	Rondanina 5', 72'	Report	Liendo 32'	Stadium: José Antonio Valle; Referee: Victor Hugo González

February 7, 2017	Comercio Central Unidos	2–1 (2–2 agg.)	Güemes (SdE)	Santiago del Estero, Pcia. de Santiago del Estero
22:00	Torres 51'; Godoy 81'	Report	Olivera 17'	Stadium: Raúl Adolfo Seijas; Referee: Rodrigo Rivero

February 7, 2017	Estudiantes (RC)	5–0 (5–1 agg.)	Tiro Federal (M)	Río Cuarto, Pcia. de Córdoba
21:30	Mattea 4'; Comba 15'; Sepúlveda 57', 80'; Abataneo 69'	Report		Stadium: Ciudad de Río Cuarto; Referee: César Ceballo

February 8, 2017	Huracán Las Heras	1–4 (1–4 agg.)	Pacífico	Las Heras, Pcia. de Mendoza
18:00	Guerra 57'	Report	Bodnarsky 5'; Gordillo 15', 85'; Méndez 65'	Stadium: General San Martín; Referee: Diego Brizuela

February 7, 2017	Colón Juniors	1–4 (2–6 agg.)	Sportivo Peñarol (Ch)	San Juan, Pcia. de San Juan
22:00	Flores 4'	Report	Chávez 12'; Cano 19', 90+2', 90+6'	Stadium: Dr. Jorge R. Barassi; Referee: Gabriel Gónzalez

February 7, 2017	Deportivo Camioneros	1–1 (2–1 agg.)	Independiente (Ch)	Esteban Echeverría, Pcia. de Buenos Aires
17:00	Campo 78'	Report	Tumbesi 26'	Stadium: Hugo Moyano; Referee: Darío López

February 7, 2017	Belgrano (SN)	0–1 (0–4 agg.)	Sportivo Barracas (C)	San Nicolás de los Arroyos, Pcia. de Buenos Aires
18:00		Report	García 44'	Stadium: Fortunato Bonelli; Referee: Maximiliano Macheroni

February 8, 2017	Deportivo Achirense	0–1 (0–2 agg.)	Belgrano (P)	Colón, Pcia. de Entre Ríos
20:30		Report	Salguero 23'	Stadium: Guillermo Bonnín; Referee: Hernan Collaso

February 7, 2017	Tiro Federal (R)	0–2 (0–3 agg.)	Ben Hur	Rafaela, Pcia. de Santa Fe
17:00		Report	González 12', 30'	Stadium: Fortín de Ludueña; Referee: Enzo Silvestre

February 7, 2017	Central Norte	0–0 (2–1 agg.)	Mitre (S)	Salta, Pcia. de Salta
17:00		Report		Stadium: Padre Ernesto Martearena; Referee: Javier Bustelo

February 7, 2017	Talleres (P)	2–1 (4–2 agg.)	Almirante Brown (L)	Perico, Pcia. de Jujuy
21:30	Sosa 37'; Argañaráz 68'	Report	Rodríguez 14'	Stadium: Doctor Plinio Zabala; Referee: Raúl Nolasco

February 7, 2017	San Martín (F)	3–1 (5–2 agg.)	Atlético Laguna Blanca	Formosa, Pcia. de Formosa
17:15	Velázquez 42'; Bejarano 57'; Sosa 65'	Report	Filippini 8'	Stadium: Estadio 17 de Octubre; Referee: Adrian Meza

February 7, 2017	Textil Mandiyú	2–1 (3–4 agg.)	Ferroviario (C)	Corrientes, Pcia. de Corrientes
17:00	Monzón 30'; Molina 83'	Report	Acevedo 28'	Stadium: José Antonio Romero Feris; Referee: Sergio Pérez

==== Round II ====
In this round, 16 qualified teams from the Round I participated. The round was played between February 11 and March 5, on a home-and-away two-legged tie. The 8 winning teams advanced to the Round III.

Team 1	Agg.	Team 2	1st leg	2nd leg
Sol de Mayo	4–0	Jorge Newbery (CR)	3–0	1–0
Kimberley	1–2	Bella Vista (BB)	0–2	1–0
Estudiantes (RC)	4–0	Güemes (SdE)	2–0	2–0
Pacífico	2–1	Sportivo Peñarol (Ch)	1–0	1–1
Deportivo Camioneros	4–0	Sportivo Barracas (C)	4–0	0–0
Ben Hur	4–1	Belgrano (P)	2–1	2–0
Talleres (P)	1–2	Central Norte	0–2	1–0
Ferroviario (C)	4–3	San Martín (F)	3–0	1–3

===== First leg =====
February 28, 2017	Sol de Mayo	3–0	Jorge Newbery (CR)	Viedma, Pcia. de Río Negro
17:00	Tunessi 4', 79'; García 69' (pen.)	Report		Stadium: Sol de Mayo; Referee: Gustavo Altuna

February 25, 2017	Kimberley	0–2	Bella Vista (BB)	Mar del Plata, Pcia. de Buenos Aires
17:00		Report	Priore 30'; Ovando 32'	Stadium: José Antonio Valle; Referee: Diego Gil

February 11, 2017	Estudiantes (RC)	2–0	Güemes (SdE)	Río Cuarto, Pcia. de Córdoba
20:30	Beraldi 31'; García 75'	Report		Stadium: Ciudad de Río Cuarto; Referee: Maximiliano Macheroni

February 11, 2017	Pacífico	1–0	Sportivo Peñarol (Ch)	General Alvear, Pcia. de Mendoza
19:00	Hongn 52'	Report		Stadium: El Gigante de Cemento; Referee: Héctor Sosa

February 11, 2017	Deportivo Camioneros	4–0	Sportivo Barracas (C)	Esteban Echeverría, Pcia. de Buenos Aires
17:00	González 12'; Cabrera 17'; Vitale 74'; Navarro 79'	Report		Stadium: Hugo Moyano; Referee: Gonzalo Ferrari

February 12, 2017	Ben Hur	2–1	Belgrano (P)	Rafaela, Pcia. de Santa Fe
19:30	Izaguirre 2', 64' (pen.)	Report	Chiavarini 15'	Stadium: Parque Barrio Ilolay; Referee: Darío López

February 11, 2017	Talleres (P)	0–2	Central Norte	Perico, Pcia. de Jujuy
17:00		Report	Puntano 1'; Armella 89'	Stadium: Doctor Plinio Zabala; Referee: Rodrigo Rivero

February 11, 2017	Ferroviario (C)	3–0	San Martín (F)	Corrientes, Pcia. de Corrientes
17:00	Badaró 30'; Fernández 37'; Diellos 69' (o.g.)	Report		Stadium: Juan Carlos Vallejos; Referee: Fernando Brillada

===== Second leg =====
March 5, 2017	Jorge Newbery (CR)	0–1 (0–4 agg.)	Sol de Mayo	Comodoro Rivadavia, Pcia. de Chubut
17:00		Report	Tunessi 48'	Stadium: Municipal de Comodoro Rivadavia; Referee: Javier Obreque

March 4, 2017	Bella Vista (BB)	0–1 (2–1 agg.)	Kimberley	Bahía Blanca, Pcia. de Buenos Aires
17:00		Report	Baigorria 48'	Stadium: Ignacio Nicolás; Referee: Marcos Gómez

February 14, 2017	Güemes (SdE)	0–2 (0–4 agg.)	Estudiantes (RC)	Santiago del Estero, Pcia. de Santiago del Estero
22:00		Report	Comba 9'; Sepúlveda 29'	Stadium: Arturo Miranda; Referee: Enzo Silvestre

February 14, 2017	Sportivo Peñarol (Ch)	1–1 (1–2 agg.)	Pacífico	San Juan, Pcia. de San Juan
17:00	Cano 9'	Report	Bodnarsky 40'	Stadium: Estadio del Bicentenario; Referee: Matías Ramos

February 14, 2017	Sportivo Barracas (C)	0–0 (0–4 agg.)	Deportivo Camioneros	Colón, Pcia. de Buenos Aires
18:00		Report		Stadium: Roberto Tito Perez; Referee: Marcos Ciardelli

February 15, 2017	Belgrano (P)	0–2 (1–4 agg.)	Ben Hur	Paraná, Pcia. de Entre Ríos
17:00		Report	Weissen 42' (pen.); Rodas 78'	Stadium: Nuevo Mondonguero; Referee: Alejo Cid

February 14, 2017	Central Norte	0–1 (2–1 agg.)	Talleres (P)	Salta, Pcia. de Salta
17:00		Report	Mendez 52'	Stadium: Padre Ernesto Martearena; Referee: Claudio Orellana

February 14, 2017	San Martín (F)	3–1 (3–4 agg.)	Ferroviario (C)	Formosa, Pcia. de Formosa
17:00	Benitez 3'; R. Franco 11'; Sosa 46'	Report	P. Franco 24'	Stadium: Estadio Antonio Romero; Referee: Sebastián Ibáñez

==== Round III ====
In this round, 8 qualified teams from the Round I participated. The round was played between February 18 and March 18, on a home-and-away two-legged tie. The 4 winning teams advanced to the Final Round.

Team 1	Agg.	Team 2	1st leg	2nd leg
Bella Vista (BB)	2–5	Sol de Mayo	1–2	1–3
Pacífico	3–3 (a)	Estudiantes (RC)	1–1	2–2
Deportivo Camioneros	4–3	Ben Hur	3–2	1–1
Ferroviario (C)	3–6	Central Norte	2–0	1–6

===== First leg =====
March 11, 2017	Bella Vista (BB)	1–2	Sol de Mayo	Bahía Blanca, Pcia. de Buenos Aires
17:00	Fernández 88'	Report	Valdebenito 35' (pen.); Tunessi 87' (pen.)	Stadium: Ignacio Nicolás; Referee: Marcelo Sanz

February 27, 2017	Pacífico	1–1	Estudiantes (RC)	General Alvear, Pcia. de Mendoza
19:00	González 83'	Report	Sepulveda 77'	Stadium: El Gigante de Cemento; Referee: Iván Ramonda

February 18, 2017	Deportivo Camioneros	3–2	Ben Hur	Esteban Echeverría, Pcia. de Buenos Aires
17:00	González 62', 73'; Campo 86'	Report	Mathier 12'; Palma 83'	Stadium: Hugo Moyano; Referee: José Díaz

February 18, 2017	Ferroviario (C)	2–0	Central Norte	Corrientes, Pcia. de Corrientes
17:00	Badaró 5'; Brunetti 85' (pen.)	Report		Stadium: Juan Carlos Vallejos; Referee: Gastón Ramírez

===== Second leg =====
March 18, 2017	Sol de Mayo	3–1 (5–2 agg.)	Bella Vista (BB)	Viedma, Pcia. de Río Negro
17:00	Tunessi 32', 73'; Malacarne 45+1'	Report	Romero 2'	Stadium: Sol de Mayo; Referee: Iván Ramonda

March 5, 2017	Estudiantes (RC)	2–2 (3–3 agg.)	Pacífico	Río Cuarto, Pcia. de Córdoba
20:30	Foglia 29', 90+4' (pen.)	Report	Gordillo 46'; Hongn 67'	Stadium: Ciudad de Río Cuarto; Referee: César Vianco

February 21, 2017	Ben Hur	1–1 (3–4 agg.)	Deportivo Camioneros	Rafaela, Pcia. de Santa Fe
21:00	Weissen 44'	Report	González 36'	Stadium: Parque Barrio Ilolay; Referee: César Ceballos

February 24, 2017	Central Norte	6–1 (6–3 agg.)	Ferroviario (C)	Salta, Pcia. de Salta
22:00	Encina 53'; Puntano 59'; Ayejes 64'; Armella 66'; Guzmán 77'; Vargas 90+4'	Report	Brunetti 26'	Stadium: Padre Ernesto Martearena; Referee: Nelson Bejas

== Final Round ==
=== Bracket ===
==== Upper bracket ====
Round of 64
River Plate	3
Atlas	0
Argentinos Juniors	0
Instituto	1
Temperley	2
Sportivo Las Parejas	0
Defensa y Justicia	3
Sol de Mayo	0
Gimnasia y Esgrima (LP)	0
Defensores de Belgrano (VR)	1
Belgrano (p)	1 (3)
Estudiantes (BA)	1 (2)
San Martín (SJ)	0
Atlanta	3
Estudiantes (LP)	2
Pacífico	3
Racing	2
Mitre (SdE)	1
Olimpo	1
Ferro Carril Oeste	0
Talleres (C)	1
Defensores de Belgrano	0
Quilmes	0 (1)
Gimnasia y Esgrima (M) (p)	0 (4)
Lanús	5
Sportivo Barracas	1
Unión (p)	0 (4)
Nueva Chicago	0 (2)
Patronato	0
Deportivo Morón	2
San Lorenzo (p)	1 (4)
Cipolletti	1 (2)

Round of 32
River Plate	4
Instituto	1
Temperley	0
Defensa y Justicia	2
Defensores de Belgrano (VR)	1 (5)
Belgrano (p)	1 (6)
Atlanta	3
Pacífico	1
Racing	2
Olimpo	4
Talleres (C)	1 (2)
Gimnasia y Esgrima (M) (p)	1 (4)
Lanús	1
Unión	2
Deportivo Morón	1
San Lorenzo	0

Round of 16
River Plate	3
Defensa y Justicia	0
Belgrano	1
Atlanta	2
Olimpo	3
Gimnasia y Esgrima (M)	2
Unión	0 (4)
Deportivo Morón (p)	0 (5)

Quarterfinals
River Plate	4
Atlanta	1
Olimpo	0
Deportivo Morón	1

Semifinals
River Plate	3
Deportivo Morón	0

==== Lower bracket ====
Round of 64
Independiente (p)	0 (5)
Deportivo Camioneros	0 (4)
Atlético Tucumán (p)	1 (4)
All Boys	1 (1)
Sarmiento (J)	1
Brown	0
Arsenal	1 (5)
Sacachispas (p)	1 (6)
Huracán (p)	2 (3)
Defensores Unidos	2 (1)
Colón	1
Independiente Rivadavia	0
Aldosivi	2
Central Córdoba (SdE)	1
Vélez Sarsfield	1
Leandro N. Alem	0
Newell's Old Boys	4
Central Norte	1
Godoy Cruz	3
Santamarina	0
Atlético de Rafaela	1
Almagro	0
Banfield	1
Chaco For Ever	0
Rosario Central	1
Cañuelas	0
Tigre	2 (1)
Deportivo Riestra (p)	2 (3)
Guillermo Brown	1
Chacarita Juniors	0
Boca Juniors	5
Gimnasia y Tiro	0

Round of 32
Independiente	1
Atlético Tucumán	2
Sarmiento (J)	3
Sacachispas	1
Huracán	1
Colón	0
Aldosivi	0
Vélez Sarsfield	1
Newell's Old Boys	1
Godoy Cruz	2
Atlético de Rafaela	2
Banfield	4
Rosario Central	2
Deportivo Riestra	1
Guillermo Brown	0
Boca Juniors	1

Round of 16
Atlético Tucumán	4
Sarmiento (J)	0
Huracán	0 (1)
Vélez Sarsfield	0 (3)
Godoy Cruz	2
Banfield	1
Rosario Central	1
Boca Juniors	0

Quarterfinals
Atlético Tucumán	1
Vélez Sarsfield	0
Godoy Cruz	2
Rosario Central	3

Semifinals
Atlético Tucumán (p)	0 (3)
Rosario Central	0 (1)

=== Round of 64 ===
This round had 11 qualified teams from the Regional Round (7 teams from Torneo Federal A and 4 teams from Torneo Federal B), 11 qualified teams from the Metropolitan Zone (5 teams from Primera B Metro; 4 teams from Primera C and 2 teams from Primera D), 12 teams from Primera B Nacional and 30 teams from Primera División. The round was played between April 25 and August 18, in a single knock-out match format. The 32 winning teams advanced to the Round of 32. The draw took place on April 5, 2017.

August 15, 2017	River Plate	3–0	Atlas	Salta, Pcia. de Salta
21:10	Martínez 12', 90+1' (pen.); Fernández 42'	Report		Stadium: Padre Ernesto Martearena; Referee: Ariel Penel

August 14, 2017	Boca Juniors	5–0	Gimnasia y Tiro	Formosa, Pcia. de Formosa
21:10	P. Pérez 32'; Cardona 38'; Fabra 50'; Benedetto 78', 87'	Report		Stadium: Antonio Romero; Referee: Pablo Echavarría

May 17, 2017	Independiente	0–0 (5–4 p)	Deportivo Camioneros	Quilmes, Pcia. de Buenos Aires
21:10		Report		Stadium: Centenario Dr. José Luis Meiszner; Referee: Ariel Penel
	Penalties
	Fernández (penalty scored); Rodríguez (penalty scored); Benítez (penalty scored); Meza (penalty missed); Barco (penalty scored); Toledo (penalty scored)		(penalty scored) González; (penalty scored) Campo; (penalty missed) Navarro; (penalty scored) Argañaraz; (penalty scored) Álvarez; (penalty missed) Gianaschi

August 15, 2017	San Lorenzo	1–1 (4–2 p)	Cipolletti	Lanús, Pcia. de Buenos Aires
18:00	Reniero 71'	Report	Piñero da Silva 20'	Stadium: Ciudad de Lanús; Referee: Andrés Merlos
	Penalties
	Blandi (penalty missed); Caruzzo (penalty scored); Rodríguez (penalty scored); Romagnoli (penalty scored); Cerutti (penalty scored)		(penalty scored) Vilce; (penalty scored) Valente; (penalty missed) Jara; (penalty missed) Ávila

August 18, 2017	Racing	2–1	Mitre (SdE)	Banfield, Pcia. de Buenos Aires
21:10	López 77'; Grimi 84'	Report	Fergonzi 22'	Stadium: Florencio Sola; Referee: Nicolás Lamolina

May 25, 2017	Vélez Sarsfield	1–0	Leandro N. Alem	Formosa, Pcia. de Formosa
21:10	Delgadillo 6'	Report		Stadium: Antonio Romero; Referee: Juan Pablo Pompei

June 11, 2017	Newell's Old Boys	4–1	Central Norte	Santa Fe, Pcia. de Santa Fe
21:50	Scocco 15', 56' (pen.); Dominguez 53'; Elías 69'	Report	Vargas 44'	Stadium: 15 de Abril; Referee: Pablo Echavarría

June 11, 2017	Estudiantes (LP)	2–3	Pacífico	Banfield, Pcia. de Buenos Aires
17:45	Otero 28'; Rodríguez 79'	Report	Amaya 12'; Hongn 19'; Montiveros 46'	Stadium: Florencio Sola; Referee: Luis Álvarez

June 9, 2017	Gimnasia y Esgrima (LP)	0–1	Defensores de Belgrano (VR)	Banfield, Pcia. de Buenos Aires
21:10		Report	Saucedo 79'	Stadium: Florencio Sola; Referee: Héctor Paletta

May 3, 2017	Banfield	1–0	Chaco For Ever	Quilmes, Pcia. de Buenos Aires
18:00	Cecchini 75'	Report		Stadium: Centenario Dr. José Luis Meiszner; Referee: Diego Ceballos

May 3, 2017	Huracán	2–2 (3–1 p)	Defensores Unidos	Formosa, Pcia. de Formosa
21:10	Mendoza 26', 66'	Report	Ortigoza 22'; Velázquez 64'	Stadium: Antonio Romero; Referee: Luis Álvarez
	Penalties
	Montenegro (penalty scored); Kaku (penalty scored); Mendoza (penalty scored)		(penalty missed) Sica; (penalty scored) Peláez; (penalty missed) Laumann; (penalty missed) Martínez

May 10, 2017	Quilmes	0–0 (1–4 p)	Gimnasia y Esgrima (M)	Turdera, Pcia. de Buenos Aires
18:00		Report		Stadium: Alfredo Beranger; Referee: Pablo Echavarría
	Penalties
	Colotto (penalty missed); González (penalty scored); Celeste (penalty missed)		(penalty scored) Curbelo; (penalty scored) Cucchi; (penalty scored) Riera; (penalty scored) Palacios Alvarenga

June 8, 2017	Lanús	5–1	Sportivo Barracas	Formosa, Pcia. de Formosa
17:00	Sand 7', 15', 60'; Rojas 57'; Sánchez 72'	Report	De Porras 48'	Stadium: Antonio Romero; Referee: Pablo Argañaraz

May 23, 2017	Arsenal	1–1 (5–6 p)	Sacachispas	Caseros, Pcia. de Buenos Aires
15:40	Fragapane 51' (pen.)	Report	Serrano 77' (pen.)	Stadium: Ciudad de Caseros; Referee: Bruno Bocca
	Penalties
	Bazán (penalty missed); Fragapane (penalty scored); Boghossian (penalty scored); Rolón (penalty scored); Imbert (penalty scored); Pérez (penalty scored); Calzada (penalty missed)		(penalty scored) Arrieta; (penalty scored) Ayala; (penalty missed) Serrano; (penalty scored) Lutzky; (penalty scored) Domínguez; (penalty scored) Ez. Dos Santos; (penalty scored) L. Fernández

April 25, 2017	Rosario Central	1–0	Cañuelas	Santa Fe, Pcia. de Santa Fe
19:00	Martínez 11'	Report		Stadium: 15 de Abril; Referee: Ramiro López

May 24, 2017	Defensa y Justicia	3–0	Sol de Mayo	Banfield, Pcia. de Buenos Aires
18:00	Stefanelli 51'; Barboza 54'; Ríos 87'	Report		Stadium: Florencio Sola; Referee: Pablo Dóvalo

June 30, 2017	Temperley	2–0	Sportivo Las Parejas	Caseros, Pcia. de Buenos Aires
18:00	Mancinelli 37'; Ozuna 51'	Report		Stadium: Ciudad de Caseros; Referee: José Sandoval

May 9, 2017	Tigre	2–2 (1–3 p)	Deportivo Riestra	Sarandí, Pcia. de Buenos Aires
18:00	Morales 17' (pen.); Luna 66'	Report	N. Benítez 38' (pen.); Ortiz 47'	Stadium: Julio Humberto Grondona; Referee: Héctor Paletta
	Penalties
	Luna (penalty missed); Morales (penalty scored); Godoy (penalty missed); Iñíguez (penalty missed)		(penalty scored) N. Benítez; (penalty missed) Flores; (penalty scored) Bochi; (penalty scored) Collavini

June 7, 2017	Sarmiento (J)	1–0	Brown	Caseros, Pcia. de Buenos Aires
18:00	Franco 51' (o.g.)	Report		Stadium: Ciudad de Caseros; Referee: Alejandro Castro

June 29, 2017	Unión	0–0 (4–2 p)	Nueva Chicago	Banfield, Pcia. de Buenos Aires
18:00		Report		Stadium: Florencio Sola; Referee: Hernán Mastrángelo
	Penalties
	Erramuspe (penalty scored); Méndez (penalty scored); Soldano (penalty missed); Britos (penalty scored); Gamba (penalty scored)		(penalty scored) Vivas; (penalty missed) Vera; (penalty missed) González; (penalty scored) Melo

May 23, 2017	Talleres (C)	1–0	Defensores de Belgrano	Rafaela, Pcia. de Santa Fe
18:00	Klusener 43' (pen.)	Report		Stadium: Nuevo Monumental; Referee: Pablo Díaz

June 7, 2017	Colón	1–0	Independiente Rivadavia	Quilmes, Pcia. de Buenos Aires
21:10	Bastía 41'	Report		Stadium: Centenario Dr. José Luis Meiszner; Referee: Fernando Echenique

June 7, 2017	Atlético de Rafaela	1–0	Almagro	Sarandí, Pcia. de Buenos Aires
15:40	Campi 58'	Report		Stadium: Julio Humberto Grondona; Referee: Pablo Echavarría

May 24, 2017	Belgrano	1–1 (3–2 p)	Estudiantes (BA)	Santa Fe, Pcia. de Santa Fe
15:40	Márquez 46'	Report	Passerini 51'	Stadium: 15 de Abril; Referee: Gastón Suárez
	Penalties
	Barbieri (penalty scored); Espíndola (penalty missed); Lema (penalty scored); Márquez (penalty scored)		(penalty missed) Pansardi; (penalty missed) Passerini; (penalty scored) Rodríguez; (penalty scored) Iribarren; (penalty missed) Pucheta

June 12, 2017	San Martín (SJ)	0–3	Atlanta	Sarandí, Pcia. de Buenos Aires
18:00		Report	Nakache 10', 25'; Dorregaray 71'	Stadium: Julio Humberto Grondona; Referee: Fernando Echenique

June 13, 2017	Godoy Cruz	3–0	Santamarina	Sarandí, Pcia. de Buenos Aires
21:10	Ortiz 22'; J. Correa 51'; Pizarro 85'	Report		Stadium: Julio Humberto Grondona; Referee: Gerardo Méndez Cedro

June 12, 2017	Aldosivi	2–1	Central Córdoba (SdE)	Caseros, Pcia. de Buenos Aires
14:45	Díaz 36' (pen.); Benedetti 90+1'	Report	González 63' (pen.)	Stadium: Ciudad de Caseros; Referee: Mauro Giannini

June 8, 2017	Olimpo	1–0	Ferro Carril Oeste	Quilmes, Pcia. de Buenos Aires
14:45	Coniglio 47'	Report		Stadium: Centenario Dr. José Luis Meiszner; Referee: Ariel Penel

June 1, 2017	Patronato	0–2	Deportivo Morón	Banfield, Pcia. de Buenos Aires
15:40		Report	Toledo 25'; Perales 70'	Stadium: Florencio Sola; Referee: Juan Pablo Pompei

June 8, 2017	Atlético Tucumán	1–1 (4–1 p)	All Boys	Salta, Pcia. de Salta
20:05	Rodríguez 80' (pen.)	Report	Salas 13'	Stadium: Padre Ernesto Martearena; Referee: Juan Pablo Pompei
	Penalties
	Menéndez (penalty scored); Barbona (penalty scored); González (penalty scored); Lucchetti (penalty scored)		(penalty missed) Vázquez; (penalty missed) Ceballos; (penalty scored) García

July 5, 2017	Guillermo Brown	1–0	Chacarita Juniors	Cutral Có, Pcia. de Neuquén
21:10	Giordana 77'	Report		Stadium: Coloso del Ruca Quimey; Referee: Héctor Paletta

July 19, 2017	Argentinos Juniors	0–1	Instituto	Cutral Có, Pcia. de Neuquén
19:00		Report	Rosales 26' (pen.)	Stadium: Coloso del Ruca Quimey; Referee: Pedro Argañaraz

=== Round of 32 ===
This round had the 32 qualified teams from the Round of 64. The round was played between August 16 and September 21, in a single knock-out match format. The 16 winning teams advanced to the Round of 16.

August 20, 2017	River Plate	4–1	Instituto	Mar del Plata, Pcia. de Buenos Aires
21:10	Alario 45+1'; Pérez 65'; Maidana 83'; Borré 84'	Report	Olego 81'	Stadium: José María Minella; Referee: Jorge Baliño

August 21, 2017	Temperley	0–2	Defensa y Justicia	Avellaneda, Pcia. de Buenos Aires
18:00		Report	Rius 33'; Sosa 79'	Stadium: Presidente Juan Domingo Perón; Referee: Juan Pablo Pompei

September 2, 2017	Defensores de Belgrano (VR)	1–1 (5–6 p)	Belgrano	Cutral Có, Pcia. de Neuquén
15:00	Prudencio 85' (pen.)	Report	Ramis 1'	Stadium: Coloso del Ruca Quimey; Referee: Nicolás Lamolina
	Penalties
	Leguizamón (penalty scored); Bonetto (penalty scored); Prudencio (penalty scored); Moreno (penalty scored); Coronel (penalty missed); Zules (penalty scored); Ruben (penalty missed)		(penalty missed) Ortiz; (penalty scored) Ramis; (penalty scored) Lema; (penalty scored) Godoy; (penalty scored) Quiroga; (penalty scored) Lértora; (penalty scored) Benítez

September 21, 2017	Atlanta	3–1	Pacífico	Caseros, Pcia. de Buenos Aires
14:30	Miranda 8' (pen.); Martínez 31'; Peinado 46' (o.g.)	Report	Olguín 24'	Stadium: Ciudad de Caseros; Referee: Mariano González

September 1, 2017	Racing	2–4	Olimpo	Banfield, Pcia. de Buenos Aires
15:00	Zaracho 38'; González 44'	Report	Tellechea 54' (pen.); Costa 68'; Troyansky 70'; Vila 90+3'	Stadium: Florencio Sola; Referee: Ariel Penel

September 1, 2017	Talleres (C)	1–1 (2–4 p)	Gimnasia y Esgrima (M)	Santa Fe, Pcia. de Santa Fe
18:00	Reynoso 90+4'	Report	Cortizo 88'	Stadium: Brigadier General Estanislao López; Referee: Mariano González
	Penalties
	Giménez (penalty missed); Reynoso (penalty scored); Menéndez (penalty scored); Palacios (penalty missed)		(penalty scored) Cortizo; (penalty scored) Becerra; (penalty scored) Aguirre; (penalty missed) Domínguez; (penalty scored) Fernández

August 16, 2017	Lanús	1–2	Unión	Sarandí, Pcia. de Buenos Aires
21:10	Silva 33'	Report	De Iriondo 39'; Gamba 63'	Stadium: Julio Humberto Grondona; Referee: Federico Beligoy

August 20, 2017	Deportivo Morón	1–0	San Lorenzo	Lanús, Pcia. de Buenos Aires
15:30	Guzmán 85'	Report		Stadium: Ciudad de Lanús; Referee: Pablo Echavarría

September 19, 2017	Independiente	1–2	Atlético Tucumán	Mendoza, Pcia. de Mendoza
21:10	Meza 13'	Report	Freitas 56'; Aliendro 75'	Stadium: Malvinas Argentinas; Referee: Fernando Echenique

September 6, 2017	Sarmiento (J)	3–1	Sacachispas	Sarandí, Pcia. de Buenos Aires
21:10	Etevenaux 31', 62'; Cacheiro 90+3'	Report	D'Oracio 84'	Stadium: Julio Humberto Grondona; Referee: Pablo Dóvalo

September 1, 2017	Huracán	1–0	Colón	La Paternal, Buenos Aires
21:10	Ábila 75' (pen.)	Report		Stadium: Diego Armando Maradona; Referee: Andrés Merlos

September 4, 2017	Aldosivi	0–1	Vélez Sarsfield	Sarandí, Pcia. de Buenos Aires
18:00		Report	Andrada 83'	Stadium: Julio Humberto Grondona; Referee: Pablo Echavarría

September 4, 2017	Newell's Old Boys	1–2	Godoy Cruz	Santa Fe, Pcia. de Santa Fe
21:10	Galeano 23' (o.g.)	Report	Rodríguez 29'; García 90'	Stadium: 15 de Abril; Referee: Luis Álvarez

September 1, 2017	Atlético de Rafaela	2–4	Banfield	Formosa, Pcia. de Formosa
21:10	Velázquez 47'; Klusener 48'	Report	Mouche 2', 30'; Bertolo 18'; Bettini 45'	Stadium: Antonio Romero; Referee: Federico Beligoy

September 3, 2017	Rosario Central	2–1	Deportivo Riestra	La Paternal, Buenos Aires
15:15	Zampedri 55'; Leguizamón 72'	Report	Gómez 65' (o.g.)	Stadium: Diego Armando Maradona; Referee: Hernán Mastrángelo

September 13, 2017	Guillermo Brown	0–1	Boca Juniors	Mendoza, Pcia. de Mendoza
20:10		Report	Benedetto 59' (pen.)	Stadium: Malvinas Argentinas; Referee: Facundo Tello

=== Round of 16 ===
This round had the 16 qualified teams from the Round of 32. The round was played between September 27 and October 9, in a single knock-out match format. The 8 winning teams advanced to the Quarterfinals.

October 7, 2017	River Plate	3–0	Defensa y Justicia	Formosa, Pcia. de Formosa
19:00	Scocco 10' (pen.), 12'; Palacios 86'	Report		Stadium: Antonio Romero; Referee: Silvio Trucco

October 9, 2017	Belgrano	1–2	Atlanta	Santa Fe, Pcia. de Santa Fe
18:00	Lértora 90+3'	Report	Pedrozo 54'; Martínez 62'	Stadium: 15 de Abril; Referee: Diego Abal

October 4, 2017	Olimpo	3–2	Gimnasia y Esgrima (M)	Sarandí, Pcia. de Buenos Aires
15:40	Mondino 25' (o.g.); Tellechea 37', 52'	Report	Ramírez 41'; Cortizo 53'	Stadium: Julio Humberto Grondona; Referee: Nicolás Lamolina

October 4, 2017	Unión	0–0 (4–5 p)	Deportivo Morón	Córdoba, Pcia. de Córdoba
18:00		Report		Stadium: Presidente Perón; Referee: Andrés Merlos
	Penalties
	Fragapane (penalty missed); Gamba (penalty scored); G. Méndez (penalty scored); Rivas (penalty scored); Bottinelli (penalty scored); D. Martínez (penalty missed)		(penalty missed) Giménez; (penalty scored) G. Martínez; (penalty scored) Akerman; (penalty scored) E. Méndez; (penalty scored) N. Martínez; (penalty scored) Racca

October 4, 2017	Atlético Tucumán	4–0	Sarmiento (J)	Salta, Pcia. de Salta
21:10	Hechalar 34'; Blanco 36'; Barbona 49'; Melo 87'	Report		Stadium: Padre Ernesto Martearena; Referee: Jorge Baliño

October 6, 2017	Huracán	0–0 (1–3 p)	Vélez Sarsfield	La Paternal, Buenos Aires
20:30		Report		Stadium: Diego Armando Maradona; Referee: Patricio Loustau
	Penalties
	Coniglio (penalty scored); Ábila (penalty missed); Toranzo (penalty missed); Kaku (penalty missed)		(penalty scored) Díaz; (penalty scored) Cufré; (penalty scored) Vargas

September 28, 2017	Godoy Cruz	2–1	Banfield	Córdoba, Pcia. de Córdoba
17:00	Ramis 20'; Giménez 63'	Report	Cvitanich 44'	Stadium: Presidente Perón; Referee: Federico Beligoy

September 27, 2017	Rosario Central	1–0	Boca Juniors	Mendoza, Pcia. de Mendoza
21:10	Martínez 25'	Report		Stadium: Malvinas Argentinas; Referee: Fernando Rapallini

=== Quarterfinals ===
This round had the 8 qualified teams from the Round of 16. The round was played between October 18 and October 24, in a single knock-out match format. The 4 winning teams advanced to the Semifinals.

October 18, 2017	River Plate	4–1	Atlanta	San Juan, Pcia. de San Juan
21:10	Saracchi 43'; Fernández 44'; Martínez 75'; Auzqui 83'	Report	A. Martínez 81'	Stadium: San Juan del Bicentenario; Referee: Germán Delfino

October 23, 2017	Olimpo	0–1	Deportivo Morón	Lanús, Pcia. de Buenos Aires
21:10		Report	Rossi 53'	Stadium: Ciudad de Lanús; Referee: Darío Herrera

October 24, 2017	Atlético Tucumán	1–0	Vélez Sarsfield	Santa Fe, Pcia. de Santa Fe
21:10	Álvarez 65'	Report		Stadium: 15 de Abril; Referee: Facundo Tello

October 23, 2017	Godoy Cruz	2–3	Rosario Central	Córdoba, Pcia. de Córdoba
18:00	García 6'; Angileri 42'	Report	Camacho 60'; Carrizo 75'; Zampedri 87'	Stadium: Presidente Perón; Referee: Ariel Penel

=== Semifinals ===
This round had the 4 qualified teams from the Quarterfinals. The round was played on November 10 and 12, in a single knock-out match format. The 2 winning teams advanced to the Final.

November 12, 2017	River Plate	3–0	Deportivo Morón	Mendoza, Pcia. de Mendoza
20:30	Fernández 39'; Maidana 42'; Borré 90'	Report		Stadium: Malvinas Argentinas; Referee: Mauro Vigliano

November 10, 2017	Atlético Tucumán	0–0 (3–1 p)	Rosario Central	Formosa, Pcia. de Formosa
20:00		Report		Stadium: Antonio Romero; Referee: Federico Beligoy
	Penalties
	Barbona (penalty scored); Grahl (penalty scored); Álvarez (penalty scored)		(penalty scored) Carrizo; (penalty missed) Ruben; (penalty missed) D. Rodríguez; (penalty missed) Martínez

== Final ==
December 9, 2017
19:15

River Plate	2–1	Atlético Tucumán
Scocco 9'; Fernández 48'	Report	Rodríguez 11'

Malvinas Argentinas, Mendoza
Referee: Fernando Rapallini

== Top goalscorers ==
Rank	Player	Club	Goals
1	(Argentina) Maximiliano Tunessi	Sol de Mayo	7
2	(Argentina) Jorge González	Deportivo Camioneros	5
2	(Argentina) Ignacio Scocco	Newell's Old Boys/River Plate	5
4	(Argentina) David Cano	Sportivo Peñarol (Ch)	4
4	(Argentina) Ignacio Fernández	River Plate	4
4	(Argentina) Bruno Sepúlveda	Estudiantes (RC)	4

== Team of the tournament ==
Team
Goalkeeper	Defenders	Midfielders	Forwards
Cristian Lucchetti (Atlético Tucumán)	Emiliano Mayola (Deportivo Morón); Jonatan Maidana (River Plate); Mauricio Martínez (Rosario Central)	Gonzalo Martínez (River Plate); Emiliano Tellechea (Olimpo); Ignacio Fernández (River Plate); David Barbona (Atlético Tucumán)	Ignacio Scocco (River Plate); Maximiliano Tunessi (Sol de Mayo); Adrián Martínez (Atlanta)
Substitutes
Julio Salvá (Deportivo Morón)	Tomás Armella (Central Norte)	Pablo Cortizo (Gimnasia y Esgrima (M)); Ivo Hongn (Pacífico); Gastón Giménez (Godoy Cruz)	Jorge González (Deportivo Camioneros); Luis Miguel Rodríguez (Atlético Tucumán)
Coach
Marcelo Gallardo (River Plate)

== See also ==
- 2017–18 Argentine Primera División
