= 2007–08 Primera B Nacional =

22nd season of the second-tier football league in Argentina

Primera B Nacional
- Season: 2007–08
- Champions: San Martín (T) (1st divisional title)
- Promoted: San Martín (T); Godoy Cruz
- Relegated: Almirante Brown; Ben Hur
- Matches played: 380
- Goals scored: 891 (2.34 per match)
- Top goalscorer: Cristian Milla; Leandro Zarate 20 goals

The 2007–08 Argentine Primera B Nacional was the 22nd season of second division professional football in Argentina. A total of 20 teams competed; the champion and runner-up were promoted to Argentine Primera División.

== Club information ==
Club	City	Stadium
Aldosivi	Mar del Plata	José María Minella
Almagro	José Ingenieros	Tres de Febrero
Almirante Brown	Isidro Casanova	Fragata Presidente Sarmiento
Atlético de Rafaela	Rafaela	Nuevo Monumental
Belgrano	Córdoba	El Gigante de Alberdi
Ben Hur	Rafaela	Parque Barrio Ilolay
CAI	Comodoro Rivadavia	Municipal de Comodoro Rivadavia
Chacarita Juniors	Villa Maipú	Chacarita Juniors
Defensa y Justicia	Florencio Varela	Norberto "Tito" Tomaghello
Ferro Carril Oeste	Caballito	Arq. Ricardo Etcheverry
Godoy Cruz	Mendoza	Malvinas Argentinas
Independiente Rivadavia	Mendoza	Bautista Gargantini
Instituto	Córdoba	Presidente Perón
Nueva Chicago	Mataderos	Nueva Chicago
Platense	Florida	Ciudad de Vicente López
Quilmes	Quilmes	Centenario
San Martín	San Miguel de Tucumán	La Ciudadela
Talleres	Córdoba	Estadio La Boutique
Tiro Federal	Rosario	Fortín de Ludueña
Unión	Santa Fe	15 de Abril

== Standings ==
Pos	Team	Pld	W	D	L	GF	GA	GD	Pts	Promotion or qualification
1	San Martín (T) (C, P)	38	18	12	8	48	28	+20	66	2008–09 Primera División
2	Godoy Cruz (P)	38	19	8	11	54	42	+12	65	2008–09 Primera División
3	Unión	38	15	11	12	52	42	+10	56	Promotion Playoff Matches
4	Belgrano	38	15	11	12	53	47	+6	56	Promotion Playoff Matches
5	Chacarita Juniors	38	15	11	12	46	45	+1	56	
6	Quilmes	38	14	13	11	43	35	+8	55	
7	Tiro Federal	38	14	12	12	44	36	+8	54	
8	Atlético de Rafaela	38	14	11	13	47	42	+5	53	
9	CAI	38	14	9	15	49	52	−3	51	
10	Ferro Carril Oeste	38	13	12	13	40	44	−4	51	
11	Aldosivi	38	13	9	16	50	45	+5	48	
12	Independiente Rivadavia	38	13	8	17	49	51	−2	47	
13	Talleres (C)	38	13	7	18	46	63	−17	46	
14	Almagro	38	12	10	16	41	50	−9	43 (Note: 3 points deducted for violence acts)	
15	Instituto	38	9	16	13	32	46	−14	43	
16	Defensa y Justicia	38	11	10	17	32	49	−17	43	
17	Platense	38	9	15	14	46	54	−8	42	
18	Almirante Brown	38	15	14	9	41	25	+16	41 (Note: 18 points deducted for violence acts)	
19	Ben Hur	38	9	11	18	31	46	−15	38	
20	Nueva Chicago	38	12	16	10	47	44	+3	34 (Note: 18 points deducted for violence acts)	

Updated to match(es) played on June 22, 2008. Source: AFA
Rules for classification: 1st points; 2nd goal difference; 3rd goals scored; 4th head-to-head points; 5th head-to-head goal difference; 6th head-to-head goals scored. This does not apply to determining the champion. If two or more teams had been tied in point at the end of the tournament, a playoff would have been held at a neutral venue within 72 hours for the championship
(C) Champions; (P) Promoted

== Promotion/relegation playoff Legs Primera División-Primera B Nacional ==
The 3rd and 4th placed of the table played with the 18th and the 17th placed of the Relegation Table of 2007–08 Primera División.

Team 1	Agg.	Team 2	1st leg	2nd leg
Relegation/promotion playoff 1
Belgrano	1–2	Racing	1–1	0–1
Relegation/promotion playoff 2
Unión	1–2	Gimnasia y Esgrima (J)	1–1	0–1

- Racing remains in Primera División by winning the playoff.
- Gimnasia y Esgrima (J) remains in Primera División by winning the playoff.

== Relegation ==
Pos	Team	2005–06 Pts	2006–07 Pts	2007–08 Pts	Total Pts	Total Pld	Avg	Situation	Affiliation
1	Godoy Cruz	63	—	65	128	76	1.684		Indirect
2	Belgrano	62	—	56	118	76	1.553		Indirect
3	Chacarita Juniors	60	61	56	177	114	1.553		Direct
4	Atlético de Rafaela	53	68	53	174	114	1.526		Indirect
5	Quilmes	—	—	55	55	38	1.447		Direct
6	San Martín (T)	—	44	66	110	76	1.447		Indirect
7	Unión	46	57	56	159	114	1.395		Direct
8	Platense	—	61	42	103	76	1.355		Direct
9	Defensa y Justicia	51	57	43	151	114	1.325		Direct
10	Almagro	52	49	43	144	114	1.263		Direct
11	Aldosivi	48	45	48	141	114	1.237		Indirect
12	Independiente Rivadavia	—	—	47	47	38	1.237		Indirect
13	CAI	44	45	51	140	114	1.228		Indirect
14	Tiro Federal	—	39	54	93	76	1.224		Indirect
15	Ferro Carril Oeste	43	39	51	133	114	1.167		Direct
16	Nueva Chicago	54	—	34	88	76	1.158	Relegation Playoff Matches	Direct
17	Instituto	—	43	43	86	76	1.132		Indirect
18	Talleres (C)	55	26	46	127	114	1.114	Relegation Playoff Matches	Indirect
19	Ben Hur	50	36	38	124	114	1.088	Torneo Argentino A	Direct
20	Almirante Brown	—	—	41	41	38	1.079	Primera B Metropolitana	Indirect

Note: Clubs with indirect affiliation with AFA are relegated to the Torneo Argentino A, while clubs directly affiliated face relegation to Primera B Metropolitana. Clubs with direct affiliation are all from Greater Buenos Aires, with the exception of Newell's, Rosario Central, Central Córdoba and Argentino de Rosario, all from Rosario, and Unión and Colón from Santa Fe.

== Relegation Playoff Legs ==
Team 1	Agg.	Team 2	1st leg	2nd leg
Relegation/promotion playoff 1 (Direct affiliation vs. Primera B Metropolitana)
Los Andes	3–0	Nueva Chicago	1–0	2–0
Relegation/promotion playoff 2 (Indirect affiliation vs. Torneo Argentino A)
Racing (C)	2–3	Talleres (C)	1–2	1–1

- Los Andes was promoted to 2008–09 Primera B Nacional by winning the playoff and Nueva Chicago was relegated to the 2008–09 Primera B Metropolitana.
- Talleres (C) remained in the Primera B Nacional by winning the playoff.

== Season statistics ==
=== Top scorers ===
Rank	Player	Club	Goals
1	(Argentina) Cristian Milla	Chacarita Juniors	19
1	(Argentina) Leandro Zarate	Unión	19
3	(Argentina) Leandro Armani	Tiro Federal	16
4	(Argentina) Luis Salmerón	Ferro Carril Oeste	15
5	(Argentina) Iván Borghello	Talleres (C)	13
5	(Argentina) Héctor Cuevas	Talleres (C)	13
5	(Argentina) Daniel Vega	Platense	13

== See also ==
- 2007–08 in Argentine football
