= 2005–06 Primera B Nacional =

20th season of the second-tier football league in Argentina

Primera B Nacional
- Season: 2005–06
- Champions: Godoy Cruz (1st divisional title)
- Promoted: Godoy Cruz; Nueva Chicago; Belgrano
- Relegated: El Porvenir; Juventud Antoniana; San Martín (M)
- Top goalscorer: AP: Daniel Bazán Vera 15 goals CL: Rubén Ferrer 10 goals

The 2005–06 Argentine Primera B Nacional was the 20th season of second division professional of football in Argentina. A total of 20 teams competed; the champion and runner-up were promoted to Argentine Primera División.

== Club information ==
Club	City	Stadium
Aldosivi	Mar del Plata	José María Minella
Almagro	José Ingenieros	Tres de Febrero
Atlético de Rafaela	Rafaela	Nuevo Monumental
Belgrano	Córdoba	El Gigante de Alberdi
Ben Hur	Rafaela	Parque Barrio Ilolay
CAI	Comodoro Rivadavia	Municipal de Comodoro Rivadavia
Chacarita Juniors	Villa Maipú	Chacarita Juniors
Defensa y Justicia	Florencio Varela	Norberto "Tito" Tomaghello
El Porvenir	Gerli	Gildo Francisco Ghersinich
Ferro Carril Oeste	Caballito	Arq. Ricardo Etcheverry
Godoy Cruz	Mendoza	Malvinas Argentinas
Huracán	Parque Patricios	Tomás Adolfo Ducó
Huracán	Tres Arroyos	Roberto Lorenzo Bottino
Juventud Antoniana	Salta	Fray Honorato Pistoia
Nueva Chicago	Mataderos	Nueva Chicago
San Martín	Mendoza	San Martín
San Martín	San Juan	Ing. Hilario Sánchez
Talleres	Córdoba	Estadio La Boutique
Tigre	Victoria	José Dellagiovanna
Unión	Santa Fe	15 de Abril

== Torneo Apertura Standings ==
Pos	Team	Pld	W	D	L	GF	GA	GD	Pts	Qualification
1	Godoy Cruz	19	12	4	3	29	14	+15	40	Promotion Playoff
2	Almagro	19	10	5	4	28	17	+11	35	
3	Chacarita Juniors	19	9	7	3	23	9	+14	34	
4	Huracán	19	10	4	5	26	16	+10	34	
5	Defensa y Justicia	19	7	9	3	19	13	+6	30	
6	Ferro Carril Oeste	19	8	5	6	15	15	0	29	
7	Belgrano	19	7	6	6	19	20	−1	27	
8	Tigre	19	4	12	3	16	13	+3	24	
9	Ben Hur	19	6	6	7	20	19	+1	24	
10	Unión	19	5	9	5	29	29	0	24	
11	Huracán (TA)	19	5	8	6	20	24	−4	23	
12	San Martín (SJ)	19	4	10	5	15	15	0	22	
13	Talleres (C)	19	4	10	5	18	19	−1	22	
14	Atlético de Rafaela	19	5	7	7	19	25	−6	22	
15	CAI	19	4	9	6	20	22	−2	21	
16	Juventud Antoniana	19	5	6	8	13	16	−3	21	
17	Nueva Chicago	19	2	13	4	23	25	−2	19	
18	Aldosivi	19	5	4	10	19	29	−10	19	
19	El Porvenir	19	4	4	11	18	30	−12	16	
20	San Martín (M)	19	3	4	12	13	32	−19	13	

Playoffs

Qrf-Final
Godoy Cruz	1	2	4
San Martín de Mendoza	1	1	3
Club El Potvenir	0	1	1
Chacarita Juniors	0	1	3
Aldosivi	2	3	4
Club Almagro	0	2	3
Nuevo Chicago	1	2	3
Ciub Atlético Huracán	0	2	4

Semifinales
Godoy Cruz	1-1	Nuevos Chaicago
Chacarita Junios	0-0	Ciub Almagro
Nuevo Cahicago	1-2	Godoy Cruz
Ciub Almagro.	2-3	Chacarita Juntos

Final
Godoy Cruz	1-0	Chacarita Juntos
Chacarita Juntos	1-0 (6-7)	Godoy Cruz

== Torneo Clausura Standings ==
Pos	Team	Pld	W	D	L	GF	GA	GD	Pts	Qualification
1	Nueva Chicago	19	10	5	4	30	20	+10	35	Promotion Playoff
2	Belgrano	19	11	2	6	29	19	+10	35	
3	San Martín (SJ)	19	9	6	4	23	15	+8	33	
4	Talleres (C)	19	9	6	4	27	20	+7	33	
5	Atlético de Rafaela	19	8	7	4	27	21	+6	31	
6	Tigre	19	8	7	4	13	13	0	31	
7	San Martín (M)	19	9	3	7	27	25	+2	30	
8	Aldosivi	19	9	2	8	20	21	−1	29	
9	Chacarita Juniors	19	6	8	5	24	18	+6	26	
10	Juventud Antoniana	19	8	2	9	23	20	+3	26	
11	Ben Hur	19	6	8	5	17	16	+1	26	
12	El Porvenir	19	7	3	9	14	23	−9	24	
13	Godoy Cruz	19	5	8	6	20	21	−1	23	
14	CAI	19	6	5	8	19	25	−6	23	
15	Huracán	19	6	4	9	27	29	−2	22	
16	Unión	19	4	10	5	16	19	−3	22	
17	Defensa y Justicia	19	6	3	10	28	25	+3	21	
18	Almagro	19	3	8	8	14	24	−10	17	
19	Huracán (TA)	19	4	4	11	15	26	−11	16	
20	Ferro Carril Oeste	19	3	5	11	15	28	−13	14	

== Overall standings ==
Pos	Team	Pld	W	D	L	GF	GA	GD	Pts	Qualification
1	Godoy Cruz	38	17	12	9	65	31	+34	63	Promotion Playoff
2	Belgrano	38	18	8	12	51	30	+21	62	Second Promotion Playoff
3	Chacarita Juniors	38	15	15	8	62	46	+16	60	Torneo Reducido
4	Huracán	38	16	8	14	51	31	+20	56	Torneo Reducido
5	San Martín (SJ)	38	13	16	9	38	30	+8	55	Torneo Reducido
6	Talleres (C)	38	13	16	9	45	39	+6	55	Torneo Reducido
7	Tigre	38	12	19	7	29	26	+3	55	
8	Nueva Chicago	38	12	18	8	53	45	+8	54	Promotion Playoff
9	Atlético de Rafaela	38	13	14	11	46	46	0	53	
10	Almagro	38	13	13	12	42	41	+1	52	
11	Defensa y Justicia	38	13	12	13	47	38	+9	51	
12	Ben Hur	38	12	14	12	37	35	+2	50	
13	Aldosivi	38	14	6	18	39	50	−11	48	
14	Juventud Antoniana	38	13	8	17	36	36	0	47	
15	Unión	38	9	19	10	45	48	−3	46	
16	CAI	38	10	14	14	39	47	−8	44	
17	Ferro Carril Oeste	38	11	10	17	30	43	−13	43	
18	San Martín (M)	38	12	7	19	40	57	−17	43	
19	El Porvenir	38	11	7	20	32	53	−21	40	
20	Huracán (TA)	38	9	12	17	35	50	−15	39	

== Promotion Playoff ==
This leg was played between the Apertura Winner: Godoy Cruz; and the Clausura Winner: Nueva Chicago. The winning team was declared champion and was automatically promoted to 2006–07 Primera División and the losing team played the Second Promotion Playoff.

=== Match details ===
Championship playoff
? May 2006
First leg

Nueva Chicago	1–1	Godoy Cruz
	Report 1 Report 2

Estadio Nueva Chicago, Buenos Aires

20 May 2006
Second leg

Godoy Cruz	3–1 (a.e.t.)	Nueva Chicago
Villar 14'; Giménez 104', 118'	Report 1 Report 2	Carranza 66'

Estadio Malvinas Argentinas, Mendoza
Attendance: 42,000
Referee: Gabriel Favale

Team details

Godoy Cruz
Nueva Chicago

GK	1	(Argentina) Sebastián Torrico
DF		(Argentina) Gonzalo Prósperi
DF		(Colombia) Josimar Mosquera
DF		(Argentina) Gustavo Bordicio
DF		(Argentina) Silvio Duarte
MF		(Argentina) Matías Arce
MF		(Argentina) Gastón Martina
MF		(Argentina) Mariano Torresi
MF	11	(Argentina) Diego Villar	(substituted off) 60'
FW		(Argentina) Enzo Pérez	(substituted off) 80'
FW		(Argentina) Daniel Giménez
Substitutions:
FW		(Argentina) Mauro Poy	(substituted in) 60'
DF		(Argentina) Marcos Barrera	(substituted in) 80'
Manager:
(Argentina) Juan Manuel Llop

GK	1	(Argentina) Mario Vega
DF		(Argentina) Cristian Wernly
DF		(Argentina) Cristian G. García
DF		(Argentina) Leandro Testa	(substituted off) 21'
DF		(Argentina) Omar Zarif	(substituted off) 105'
MF		(Argentina) Cristian Pellerano
MF		(Argentina) Mariano Donda
MF		(Argentina) Hernán Mattiuzzo
MF	10	(Argentina) César Carranza
FW	7	(Argentina) Federico Higuaín
FW		(Argentina) Lucas Simón
Substitutions:
DF		(Argentina) Marcelo Barreña	(substituted in) 21' (red card) 114'
		(Argentina) Pérez	(substituted in) 105'
Manager:
(Argentina) Rodolfo Motta

== Second Promotion Playoff ==
This leg was played by Nueva Chicago, the losing team of the Promotion Playoff, and Belgrano, who was the best team in the overall standings under the champions. The winning team was promoted to 2006–07 Primera División and the losing team played the Promotion Playoff Primera División-Primera B Nacional.

=== Match details ===
2nd. Promotion playoff
23 May 2006
First leg

Nueva Chicago	3–1	Belgrano (C)
Higuaín 57' (pen.); Carranza 64'; Simón 87'	Report	Gigli 9'

Ferro Carril Oeste, Buenos Aires
Referee: Juan Pablo Pompei

27 May 2006
Second Leg

Belgrano (C)	3–3 (a.e.t.)	Nueva Chicago
Campodónico 68', 103' (pen.); Bustos 80'	Report	Wernly 105'; Simón 113'; Pellerano 115'

Chateau Carreras, Córdoba
Referee: Rafael Furchi

Team details

Belgrano (C)
Nueva Chicago

GK	(Argentina) Germán Montoya
DF	(Argentina) Germán Noce	Sent off (straight red)
DF	(Argentina) Franco Peppino
DF	(Argentina) Gastón Turús	Sent off (straight red)
DF	(Argentina) César Manzanelli
MF	(Argentina) Walter Bustos
MF	(Argentina) Raúl Gordillo
MF	(Argentina) Andrés Aimar
MF	(Argentina) Paolo Frangipane
FW	(Argentina) Matías Gigli
FW	(Argentina) Mariano Campodónico
Manager:
(Argentina) Carlos Ramacciotti

GK		(Argentina) Daniel Vega	Sent off (straight red)
DF		(Argentina) Cristian Wernly
DF		(Argentina) Leonardo Sigali
DF		(Argentina) Nicolás Sánchez
DF		(Argentina) Marcelo Barreña
MF		(Argentina) Omar Zarif
MF		(Argentina) Cristian Pellerano
MF		(Argentina) Hernán Mattiuzzo
FW		(Argentina) Mariano Donda
FW		(Argentina) Federico Higuaín
FW	10	(Argentina) César Carranza
Manager:
(Argentina) Rodolfo Motta

Nueva Chicago won 6–4 on aggregate, becoming the 2nd. team promoted to Primera División

== Torneo Reducido ==
It was played by the teams placed 3rd, 4th 5th and 6th in the Overall Standings: Chacarita Juniors (3rd), Huracán (4th), San Martín (SJ) (5th) and Talleres (C) (6th). The winning team played the Promotion Playoff Primera División-Primera B Nacional.

=== Semifinals ===
Team 1	Agg.	Team 2	1st leg	2nd leg
Semifinals
Huracán	5–3	San Martín (SJ)	2–3	3–0
Semifinals
Chacarita Juniors	2–0	Talleres (C)	0–0	2–0

=== Final ===
Team 1	Agg.	Team 2	1st leg	2nd leg
Semifinals
Chacarita Juniors	2–3	Huracán	0–3	2–0

== Promotion Playoff Primera División-Primera B Nacional ==
The Second Promotion playoff loser (Belgrano) and the Torneo Reducido Winner (Huracán) played against the 18th and the 17th placed of the Relegation Table of 2005–06 Primera División.

Team 1	Agg.	Team 2	1st leg	2nd leg
Relegation/promotion playoff 1
Huracán	3–3	Argentinos Juniors	1–1	2–2
Relegation/promotion playoff 2
Belgrano	4–2	Olimpo	2–1	2–1

- Argentinos Juniors remains in Primera División after a 3-3 aggregate tie by virtue of a "sports advantage". In case of a tie in goals, the team from the Primera División gets to stay in it.
- Belgrano was promoted to 2006–07 Primera División by winning the playoff and Olimpo de Bahía Blanca was relegated to the 2006–07 Primera B Nacional.

== Relegation ==
Pos	Team	2003–04 Pts	2004–05 Pts	2005–06 Pts	Total Pts	Total Pld	Avg	Situation	Affiliation
1	Belgrano	57	53	62	172	114	1.509		Indirect
2	Huracán	54	61	56	171	114	1.5		Direct
3	Godoy Cruz	58	47	63	168	114	1.474		Indirect
4	Atlético de Rafaela	—	58	53	111	76	1.461		Indirect
5	Tigre	—	—	55	55	38	1.447		Direct
6	Almagro	58	—	52	110	76	1.447		Direct
7	Nueva Chicago	—	55	54	109	76	1.434		Direct
8	Chacarita Juniors	—	45	60	105	76	1.382		Direct
9	San Martín (SJ)	50	52	55	157	114	1.377		Indirect
10	Talleres (C)	—	49	55	104	76	1.368		Indirect
11	CAI	47	61	44	152	114	1.333		Indirect
12	Huracán (TA)	62	—	39	101	76	1.329		Indirect
13	Ben Hur	—	—	50	50	38	1.316		Indirect
14	Ferro Carril Oeste	54	52	43	149	114	1.307		Direct
15	Aldosivi	—	—	48	48	38	1.263		Indirect
16	Unión	47	51	46	144	114	1.263		Direct
17	San Martín (M)	42	55	43	140	114	1.228	Relegation Playoff Matches	Indirect
18	Defensa y Justicia	48	40	51	139	114	1.219	Relegation Playoff Matches	Direct
19	El Porvenir	52	46	40	138	114	1.211	Primera B Metropolitana	Direct
20	Juventud Antoniana	42	45	47	134	114	1.175	Torneo Argentino A	Indirect

Note: Clubs with indirect affiliation with AFA are relegated to the Torneo Argentino A, while clubs directly affiliated face relegation to Primera B Metropolitana. Clubs with direct affiliation are all from Greater Buenos Aires, with the exception of Newell's, Rosario Central, Central Córdoba and Argentino de Rosario, all from Rosario, and Unión and Colón from Santa Fe.

== Relegation Playoff Matches ==
Team 1	Agg.	Team 2	1st leg	2nd leg
Relegation/promotion playoff 1 (Direct affiliation vs. Primera B Metropolitana)
Deportivo Morón	4–4	Defensa y Justicia	1–1	3–3
Relegation/promotion playoff 2 (Indirect affiliation vs. Torneo Argentino A)
San Martín (T)	1–0	San Martín (M)	1–0	0–0

- Defensa y Justicia remains in Primera B Nacional after a 4-4 aggregate tie by virtue of a "sports advantage". In case of a tie in goals, the team from the Primera B Nacional gets to stay in it.
- San Martín (T) was promoted to 2006–07 Primera B Nacional by winning the playoff and San Martín (M) was relegated to 2006–07 Torneo Argentino A.

== See also ==
- 2005–06 in Argentine football
