= Lucio Barroca =

Argentine footballer

Personal information
- Full name: Lucio Fernando Barroca
- Date of birth: 30 May 1993 (age 33)
- Place of birth: Tres Arroyos, Argentina
- Height: 1.74 m (5 ft 9 in)
- Position: Attacking midfielder

Youth career
- Huracán TA

Senior career*
Years	Team	Apps	(Gls)
2009–2013	Huracán TA	22	(0)
2015	Bella Vista	16	(1)
2016	Newbery	14	(2)
2017	Huracán CR	14	(2)
2018	Los Andes	4	(0)
2019	Pérez Zeledón	4	(0)
2019	Real Estelí	18	(3)
- * Club domestic league appearances and goals as of 20 December 2020

Lucio Fernando Barroca (born 30 May 1993) is an Argentine professional footballer who plays as an attacking midfielder.

== Career statistics ==
As of 25 November 2020

Club statistics
Club	Season	League			National Cup		Continental (Note: Includes appearances in CONCACAF League.)		Other (Note: Includes appearances in the Liga FPD playoffs.)		Total	
Club	Season	Division	Apps	Goals	Apps	Goals	Apps	Goals	Apps	Goals	Apps	Goals
Huracán TA	2011–12	Torneo Argentino A	2	0	0	0	—		0	0	2	0
Huracán TA	2012–13	Torneo Argentino B	20	0	0	0	—		0	0	20	0
Huracán TA	Total		22	0	0	0	0	0	0	0	22	0
Bella Vista	2015	Torneo Federal B	16	1	0	0	—		0	0	16	1
Newbery	2016–17	Torneo Federal B	14	2	0	0	—		0	0	14	2
Huracán CR	2017–18	Torneo Federal B	14	2	0	0	—		0	0	14	2
Los Andes	2018–19	Primera B Nacional	4	0	0	0	—		0	0	4	0
Pérez Zeledón	2018–19	Liga FPD	4	0	0	0	—		1	0	5	0
Real Estelí	2019–20	Nicaraguan Primera Liga	18	3	0	0	2	1	0	0	20	4
Career total			92	8	0	0	2	1	1	0	95	9
