= Agustin Gómez =

Agustín Gómez may refer to:

- Agustín Gómez García (1870–1926), Chilean teacher and politician
- Agustín Gómez (footballer, born 1922), Spanish football left-back
- Agustín Gómez Arcos (1933–1998), Spanish writer
- Agustín Gómez (footballer, born 1983), Argentine football goalkeeper
- Agustin Gómez (footballer, born 1996), Argentine football defender
