= Santiago Paz =

Argentine footballer

Personal information
- Full name: Santiago Nicolas Paz
- Date of birth: 6 October 1996 (age 30)
- Place of birth: Rafaela, Argentina
- Position: Midfielder

Youth career
- Atlético de Rafaela

Senior career*
Years	Team	Apps	(Gls)
2016–2020	Atlético de Rafaela	5	(1)
2017	→ Huracán Las Breñas (loan)		
2019	→ Ben Hur (loan)	12	(1)
2019–2020	→ San Miguel (loan)		
2021	Atlético Pantoja		
- * Club domestic league appearances and goals as of 19:31, 24 November 2019 (UTC)

Santiago Nicolas Paz (born 6 October 1996) is an Argentine footballer who plays as a midfielder.
