= Pezzella =

Pezzella is a surname. Notable people with the surname include:

- Bruno Pezzella (born 1988), Argentine footballer
- Germán Pezzella (born 1991), Argentine footballer
- Giuseppe Pezzella (born 1997), Italian footballer
- Salvatore Pezzella (born 2000), Italian footballer
