= Pablo Barrientos =

Argentine footballer

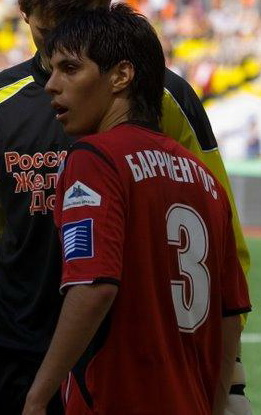
- Barrientos with Moscow in 2007

Personal information
- Full name: Pablo Cesar Barrientos
- Date of birth: 17 January 1985 (age 41)
- Place of birth: Comodoro Rivadavia, Argentina
- Height: 1.76 m (5 ft 9 in)
- Position: Attacking midfielder

Youth career
- Newbery
- 2001–2002: Huracán
- 2003: San Lorenzo

Senior career*
Years	Team	Apps	(Gls)
2003–2006	San Lorenzo	72	(7)
2006–2009	Moscow	42	(6)
2008–2009	→ San Lorenzo (loan)	21	(8)
2009–2014	Catania	86	(14)
2011	→ Estudiantes (loan)	13	(0)
2014–2016	San Lorenzo	47	(3)
2016–2019	Toluca	88	(15)
2019–2020	Nacional	10	(0)
2020–2021	Newbery	3	(0)

International career
2004–2005	Argentina U20	15	(6)
- * Club domestic league appearances and goals

Pablo Cesar Barrientos (born 17 January 1985) is an Argentine former professional footballer who played as an attacking midfielder.

== Club career ==
=== San Lorenzo ===
Barrientos was born in Comodoro Rivadavia, Argentina. He began his professional career in 2003 with San Lorenzo, as he officially was promoted from youth team football to the club's first team. He established himself at the Argentine club, and his performance saw him begin to earn call-ups to the Argentine U20 and U21 football teams. At the age of 21, he had made 72 league appearances with 7 league goals, also earning 15 caps and scoring 6 goals for his country. His form lead to many transfer rumours, and the player was linked to a host of European clubs. However, in July 2006, Barrientos transferred to FC Moscow, of Russia.

=== FC Moscow ===
Following his move to Russia, Barrientos did not hold down a guaranteed starting spot and after two seasons in the Russian Premier League, he had made 33 league appearances and scored 6 goals. For the 2008–09 season, Barrientos was sent back on loan to San Lorenzo. He scored 9 goals in 21 league starts. Following his return to Moscow, he was again linked to several different clubs. In May 2009, it was confirmed that Barrientos signed for Sicilian club Calcio Catania in the Serie A.

=== Calcio Catania ===
On 30 May 2009, Calcio Catania officially signed Barrientos from FC Moscow on a four-year contract until June 2013. He was plagued by injury and failed to make his debut for the Sicilian club until May 2010. After making two substitute appearances for Catania in the whole of the 2009–10 season, Barrientos did not play any matches in the first half of the 2010–11 Serie A season. Therefore, he was loaned to Estudiantes back in Argentina for six months. After the loan spell during which he scored five goals in seven league matches, Barrientos returned to Catania in July 2011 and became a key component to the team under new head coach, Vincenzo Montella. During the 2012-13 Serie A campaign, Barrientos was a key part of Rolando Maran's first team, scoring 5 goals in 27 league appearances. He formed part of an all-Argentine attack force with Gonzalo Bergessio, Alejandro Gómez, and Lucas Castro for the Sicilian club that has seen i rossazzurri push for the European places.

Barrientos was part of a record-breaking Catania outfit that had picked up 56 points from 38 Serie A matches. This performance saw the club also break its record number of home victories in a single season, its record number of victories overall in a single top flight campaign, as well as its record points total in Serie A for the fifth consecutive season.

=== San Lorenzo ===
In July 2014 it was reported that Barrientos would return to San Lorenzo, the team in which he made his debut as a professional player. It was his third time playing for El Ciclón.

Marcó 9 goles en 21 partidos. Con Edgardo "Patón" Bauza como técnico, logró coronarse campeón de la Copa Libertadores ante el nacional de Paraguay, con un gol de Néstor Ortigoza de penal. Además marcó un gol clave para la clasificación al mundial de clubes, venciendo al Auckland City por 2–1. Luego, en diciembre de ese año, el ciclón enfrentó al Real Madrid, cayendo por 2-0 con goles de Sergio Ramos y Gareth Bale.

En 2015, Barrientos fue una pieza clave para el equipo Azulgrana. Marcando goles clave, como uno a Estudiantes de mitad de cancha en el torneo local.

Además, contribuyó con un gol de tiro libre a la histórica victoria ante Boca Juniors, goleando 4-0 al equipo Xeneize. Consagrándose campeón de la Supercopa Argentina.

=== Toluca ===
On 29 July 2016, Barrientos signed for Deportivo Toluca.

=== Later career and retirement ===
In February 2020, after a spell with Nacional, Barrientos announced his retirement from professional football.

In October 2020, however, he returned to his former youth club Jorge Newbery de Comodoro Rivadavia back in his hometown Comodoro Rivadavia. After a third degree sprain in January 2021, Barrientos announced that he would retire completely from playing football. A week later, the vice president of the club and brother of Pablo Barrientos, Leo Barrientos, confirmed that Pablo would be a part of the club's management.

== International career ==
After receiving 15 U-20 caps for his country in which he scored 6 goals, Barrientos received a call-up to the Argentina squad against Chile on 15 November 2008 by Alfio Basile.

== Personal life ==
Pablo's brother, Hugo is a fellow footballer playing in Argentina.

== Career statistics ==
As of match played on 8 April 2018

Appearances and goals by club, season and competition
Club	Season	League			National cup		League cup		Other		Total	
Club	Season	Division	Apps	Goals	Apps	Goals	Apps	Goals	Apps	Goals	Apps	Goals
Moscow	2006	Russian Premier League	8	2	0	0	—		—		8	2
Moscow	2007	Russian Premier League	30	4	0	0	—		—		30	4
Moscow	2008	Russian Premier League	4	0	0	0	—		—		4	0
Moscow	Total		42	6	0	0	0	0	0	0	42	6
San Lorenzo (loan)	2008–09	Argentine Primera División	21	8	0	0	—		2	1	23	9
Catania	2009–10	Serie A	2	0	0	0	—		—		2	0
Catania	2010–11	Serie A	0	0	2	0	—		—		2	0
Catania	2011–12	Serie A	25	4	1	0	—		—		26	4
Catania	2012–13	Serie A	31	5	4	0	—		—		35	5
Catania	2013–14	Serie A	28	5	0	0	—		—		28	5
Catania	Total		86	14	7	0	0	0	0	0	93	14
Estudiantes (loan)	2010–11	Argentine Primera División	13	0	0	0	—		6	2	19	2
San Lorenzo	2014	Argentine Primera División	12	1	0	0	—		5	1	17	2
San Lorenzo	2015	Argentine Primera División	22	1	2	0	—		5	0	29	1
San Lorenzo	2016	Argentine Primera División	13	1	0	0	—		6	2	19	3
San Lorenzo	Total		47	3	2	0	0	0	16	3	65	6
Toluca	2016–17	Liga MX	35	8	6	0	—		—		41	8
Toluca	2017–18	Liga MX	26	2	7	1	—		—		33	3
Toluca	Total		61	10	13	1	0	0	0	0	74	11
Career total			270	41	22	1	0	0	24	6	316	48

== Honours ==
San Lorenzo

- Copa Libertadores: 2014
- Supercopa Argentina: 2015

Nacional

- Torneo Clausura: 2019
- Uruguayan Primera División: 2019
