= Matías Rojo =

Argentine footballer

Personal information
- Full name: Matías Raúl Rojo
- Date of birth: 19 April 1993 (age 33)
- Place of birth: Sunchales, Argentina
- Height: 1.82 m (5 ft 11 1/2 in)
- Position: Midfielder

Team information
- Current team: San Martín de Mendoza

Youth career
- Unión Sunchales

Senior career*
| Years | Team | Apps | (Gls) |
| 2012–2017 | Unión Sunchales | 131 | (13) |
| 2017–2020 | Guillermo Brown | 20 | (6) |
| 2021 | Unión Sunchales | 8 | (0) |
| 2021 | Gualaceo | 0 | (0) |
| 2022–2023 | Ciudad de Bolívar | 2 | (0) |
| 2023 | Ben Hur | | |
| 2024 | Unión Sunchales | 22 | (1) |
| 2025– | San Martín de Mendoza | 15 | (0) |
- * Club domestic league appearances and goals as of 22:11, 07 January 2026 (UTC)

Matías Raúl Rojo (born 19 April 1993) is an Argentine professional footballer who plays as a midfielder for San Martín de Mendoza in the Torneo Federal A of Argentina.

== Career ==
Rojo started his career with Torneo Argentino A's Unión Sunchales, appearing in four fixtures throughout 2011–12 as they were relegated to Torneo Argentino B. He remained in the fourth tier for two years, netting eight goals across sixty-two matches which culminated with promotion in 2014. Having spent three further seasons in Torneo Federal A, netting two goals in each campaign, Rojo joined Primera B Nacional's Guillermo Brown on 13 August 2017. He made his professional bow during an away defeat to Instituto on 17 September. Six goals followed in 2017–18, including a brace over Ferro Carril Oeste in November, as they finished sixteenth. After passing through Ciudad de Bolívar, Ben Hur, and Unión Sunchales, In 2025 he became a player for San Martín de Mendoza.

== Career statistics ==
As of 25 January 2019.

Club statistics
| Club | Season | League | | | Cup | | Continental | | Other | | Total | |
| Club | Season | Division | Apps | Goals | Apps | Goals | Apps | Goals | Apps | Goals | Apps | Goals |
|---|---|---|---|---|---|---|---|---|---|---|---|---|
| Unión Sunchales | 2011–12 | Torneo Argentino A | 4 | 0 | 0 | 0 | — | | 0 | 0 | 4 | 0 |
| Unión Sunchales | 2015 | Torneo Federal A | 29 | 1 | 0 | 0 | — | | 5 (Note: Appearance(s) in the Torneo Federal A) | 1 | 34 | 2 |
| Unión Sunchales | 2016 | Torneo Federal A | 11 | 2 | 2 | 0 | — | | 0 | 0 | 13 | 2 |
| Unión Sunchales | 2016–17 | Torneo Federal A | 25 | 2 | 3 | 0 | — | | 2 | 0 | 30 | 2 |
| Unión Sunchales | Total | | 69 | 5 | 5 | 0 | — | | 7 | 1 | 81 | 6 |
| Guillermo Brown | 2017–18 | Primera B Nacional | 19 | 6 | 0 | 0 | — | | 0 | 0 | 19 | 6 |
| Guillermo Brown | 2018–19 | Primera B Nacional | 0 | 0 | 0 | 0 | — | | 0 | 0 | 0 | 0 |
| Guillermo Brown | Total | | 19 | 6 | 0 | 0 | — | | 0 | 0 | 19 | 6 |
| Career total | | | 88 | 11 | 5 | 0 | — | | 7 | 1 | 100 | 12 |
