= Ian Subiabre =

Argentine footballer (born 2007)

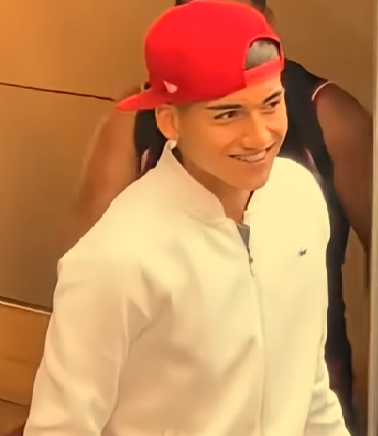
- Subiabre in 2025.

Personal information
- Full name: Ian Martín Subiabre
- Date of birth: 1 January 2007 (age 19)
- Place of birth: Comodoro Rivadavia, Chubut, Argentina
- Height: 1.71 m (5 ft 7 in)
- Positions: Winger; forward

Team information
- Current team: Tigre (on loan from River Plate)
- Number: 25

Youth career
- 2011–2013: El Globito
- 2014–2015: CAI
- 2015: River Plate
- 2015–2021: CAI
- 2022–2025: River Plate

Senior career*
Years	Team	Apps	(Gls)
2024–	River Plate	33	(3)
2026–	→ Tigre (loan)	7	(0)

International career^{‡}
2022	Chile U17	1	(0)
2022–2023	Argentina U17	20	(3)
2025–	Argentina U20	15	(5)
Medal record
Men's football
Representing Argentina
FIFA U-20 World Cup
Runner-up	2025 Chile
South American U-20 Championship
Runner-up	2025 Venezuela
- * Club domestic league appearances and goals as of 17:55, 9 November 2026 (UTC) ‡ National team caps and goals as of 1 December 2023

Ian Martín Subiabre (born 1 January 2007) is an Argentine professional footballer who plays as a winger and forward for Argentine Primera Division club Tigre, on loan from River Plate. Subiabre also plays for the Argentina national U20 team.

== Early and personal life ==
Subiabre was born in Comodoro Rivadavia in the Chubut Province of Argentina to former footballer Martín Subiabre, who played for CAI and Huracán de Comodoro Rivadavia. His paternal grandparents are Chilean, and because of this his father earned the nickname Chile while playing.

== Club career ==
Inheriting his passion for football from his father, Subiabre's first club was El Lobo in his native Comodoro Rivadavia, whom he joined at the age of four. He joined the academy of his father's former club, CAI, at the age of seven, but the following year he was given the opportunity to play briefly for River Plate, the club he had supported as a child.

He would remain officially with CAI, due to the long travelling distance from Comodoro Rivadavia to Buenos Aires, though he would return to River Plate semi-regularly to feature for their youth teams. In August 2021, he trialled with River Plate, who offered him a contract beginning in January of the following year. He signed his first professional contract with the club in April 2023, penning a three-year deal.

In November 2023, River Plate manager Martín Demichelis stated that Subiabre, alongside teammates Agustín Ruberto and Ulises Giménez, would feature in the senior squad's pre-season preparations.

== International career ==
In early 2022, Subiabre received a call-up from the Chilean under-17 side, and went on to play in one friendly matches against Colombia. However, in September of the same year, he accepted a call-up from Argentina under-17 coach Pablo Aimar, and would go on to make his debut for the side at the 2022 Copa Ciudad de Ezeiza, coming on as a second-half substitute in a 4–0 win against Peru. He went on to feature in two more friendly games, against Bolivia and Venezuela, scoring his first goal against the former in a 5–1 win.

Having featured for Argentina at the 2023 South American U-17 Championship, Subiabre was again called up to the team for the 2023 FIFA U-17 World Cup. In Argentina's final group game, against Poland, Subiabre scored the third goal of the game as Argentina went on to win 4–0.

== Style of play ==
Subiabre describes himself as a "powerful striker and scorer", though he is often utilised as a winger, and names fellow Argentine Julián Álvarez as an inspiration on his style of play.
