= Torresi =

Torresi is a surname. Notable people with the surname include:

- Alessio Gelsini Torresi (born 1951), Italian cinematographer
- Mariano Torresi (born 1981), Argentine footballer

== See also ==
- Torres (surname)
