= Agustín Gómez (footballer, born 1983) =

Argentine footballer

Personal information
- Full name: Agustín Javier Gómez
- Date of birth: 5 February 1983 (age 43)
- Place of birth: Luján, Argentina
- Height: 1.84 m (6 ft 1/2 in)
- Position: Goalkeeper

Senior career*
Years	Team	Apps	(Gls)
2003–2004	Nueva Chicago		
2004–2005	Villa Dálmine		
2005–2007	Nueva Chicago		
2007–2008	Quilmes	0	(0)
2008–2009	Atlanta	6	(0)
2009–2011	Nueva Chicago	81	(0)
2012–2014	Villa Dálmine		
2014	Deportivo Morón	1	(0)
2015–2016	Almagro	55	(0)
2016–2017	Atlanta	26	(0)
2017–2019	Barracas Central	19	(0)
2018–2019	→ Deportivo Riestra (loan)	3	(0)
2019–2020	Deportivo Camioneros	21	(0)
- * Club domestic league appearances and goals

Agustín Javier Gómez (born 5 February 1983) is a retired Argentine professional footballer who played as a goalkeeper.

== Career ==
Gómez started his senior career with Nueva Chicago in 2003, which would turn out to be the first of his three separate spells with the club. He departed the then-Argentine Primera División team in 2004 to join Villa Dálmine of Primera C Metropolitana, prior to returning a year after. Gómez's secondary spell lasted two years, by which point he had appeared twice in the top-flight for Nueva Chicago. 2007 saw Gómez join Quilmes, but he failed to feature during the 2007–08 Primera B Nacional and subsequently left to sign for Atlanta in 2008. Six appearances followed for the club in Primera B Metropolitana.

On 30 June 2009, Nueva Chicago signed Gómez for a second time; with them now playing in the same division as Atlanta. He would go on to be selected in eighty-one matches across the 2009–10 and 2010–11 campaigns. Midway through the 2011–12 season, Gómez completed a return to Primera C Metropolitana's Villa Dálmine. In his first season, the club were promoted to Primera B Metropolitana as champions. He departed the team two and a half years and sixty-eight games later. Subsequent spells with Deportivo Morón and Almagro preceded a reunion with Atlanta.

In August 2017, Gómez joined Barracas Central. He belatedly made his club debut on 25 January 2018, playing the full duration of a 2–0 victory over Talleres in Primera B Metropolitana. They finished the campaign sixth, reaching the play-offs where they were knocked out by Defensores de Belgrano. Deportivo Riestra agreed to sign Gómez on loan in June 2018.

== Career statistics ==
As of 1 October 2018.

Club statistics
Club	Season	League			Cup (Note: Includes the Copa Argentina)		League Cup		Continental		Other		Total	
Club	Season	Division	Apps	Goals	Apps	Goals	Apps	Goals	Apps	Goals	Apps	Goals	Apps	Goals
Nueva Chicago	2005–06	Primera B Nacional	1	0	0	0	—		—		0	0	1	0
Quilmes	2007–08	Primera B Nacional	0	0	0	0	—		—		0	0	0	0
Atlanta	2008–09	Primera B Metropolitana	6	0	0	0	—		—		0	0	6	0
Villa Dálmine	2012–13	Primera B Metropolitana	33	0	0	0	—		—		0	0	33	0
Villa Dálmine	2013–14	Primera B Metropolitana	35	0	0	0	—		—		0	0	35	0
Villa Dálmine	Total		68	0	0	0	—		—		0	0	68	0
Deportivo Morón	2014	Primera B Metropolitana	1	0	0	0	—		—		0	0	1	0
Almagro	2015	Primera B Metropolitana	36	0	1	0	—		—		4 (Note: Four appearances in the 2015 Primera B Metropolitana play-offs)	0	41	0
Almagro	2016	Primera B Nacional	19	0	1	0	—		—		0	0	20	0
Almagro	Total		55	0	2	0	—		—		4	0	61	0
Atlanta	2016–17	Primera B Metropolitana	26	0	1	0	—		—		1 (Note: One appearance in the 2016–17 Primera B Metropolitana play-offs)	0	28	0
Barracas Central	2017–18	Primera B Metropolitana	19	0	0	0	—		—		1 (Note: One appearance in the 2017–18 Primera B Metropolitana play-offs)	0	20	0
Barracas Central	2018–19	Primera B Metropolitana	0	0	0	0	—		—		0	0	0	0
Barracas Central	Total		19	0	0	0	—		—		1	0	20	0
Deportivo Riestra (loan)	2018–19	Primera B Metropolitana	0	0	0	0	—		—		0	0	0	0
Career total			182	0	3	0	—		—		6	0	191	0

== Honours ==
Villa Dálmine

- Primera C Metropolitana: 2011–12
