= Martín Subiabre =

Argentine footballer (born 1984)

Personal information
- Full name: Martín Rodrigo Subiabre
- Date of birth: 12 October 1984 (age 42)
- Place of birth: Comodoro Rivadavia, Chubut, Argentina
- Height: 1.79 m (5 ft 10 in)
- Position: Midfielder

Youth career
- La Súper Económica
- Juventud Unida
- CAI

Senior career*
Years	Team	Apps	(Gls)
2002–2004	CAI	32	(1)
2005	Huracán de Comodoro Rivadavia	7	(0)
2005–2007	Brown de Puerto Madryn	29	(1)
2007	Racing de Trelew	18	(0)
2008–2010	Huracán de Comodoro Rivadavia		
2010–2011	Deportivo Madryn	9	(0)
2012–2013	Huracán de Comodoro Rivadavia		
- Florentino Ameghino
- Laprida del Oeste
2017	Olimpia Juniors	5	(0)
Total		181	(6)

Managerial career
- 2023–: Laprida
- * Club domestic league appearances and goals

Martín Rodrigo Subiabre (born 12 October 1984) is an Argentine former footballer who played as a midfielder in the lower divisions of Argentine football.

== Early life ==
Subiabre was born in Comodoro Rivadavia in the Chubut Province to Lorenzo Subiabre, a Chilean boxer who also featured in the local veteran football leagues, and is the eldest of four siblings.

== Career ==
Subiabre began his career with local indoor football team La Súper Económica, before joining the academy of Juventud Unida. He went on to join professional side CAI, and after playing in friendly games in Buenos Aires, he was scouted by first-division side River Plate.

Despite this interest, he remained with CAI, scoring on his debut for the side in September 2002 against Huracán de Tres Arroyos. After two years with the club, in which he helped the club earn promotion from the Torneo Argentino A to the Primera Nacional B, he joined Huracán de Comodoro Rivadavia, but featured sparingly before moving on to Brown de Puerto Madryn.

A brief spell with Racing de Trelew followed, before he returned to Huracán de Tres Arroyos, going on to captain the club. In 2020, ahead of a game between Huracán and Deportivo Madryn, a video of Subiabre giving an impassioned speech in the tunnel before a match between the same two sides in 2010 went viral.

Subiabre went on to represent Deportivo Madryn before a final spell with Huracán, before dropping down to the lower leagues of Argentina, where he played for Florentino Ameghino, Laprida del Oeste and Olimpia Juniors, the latter of whom he represented in the Torneo Argentino B.

Following his retirement, Subiabre went into coaching, and in September 2023 he took up a role as joint-head coach at Laprida, alongside Oscar Colman.

== Personal life ==
Subiabre's son, Ian, is also a professional footballer, and currently plays for River Plate.
