= Andrés Jemio =

Argentine footballer

Personal information
- Full name: Andrés Martín Jemio Portugal
- Date of birth: 6 July 1976 (age 50)
- Place of birth: San Miguel de Tucumán, Argentina
- Height: 1.83 m (6 ft 0 in)
- Position: Goalkeeper

Senior career*
Years	Team	Apps	(Gls)
1999–2002	Atlético Tucumán		
2002–2004	Independiente Rivadavia		
2004–2007	Atlético Tucumán		
2007–2008	The Strongest		
2008	Ben Hur		
2009–2010	Blooming		
2011–2015	The Strongest		
- * Club domestic league appearances and goals

Andrés Jemio (born 6 July 1976) is a retired Argentine football goalkeeper.
