= Juan Darío Batalla =

Argentine footballer (born 1979)

Personal information
- Date of birth: September 18, 1979 (age 47)
- Place of birth: San Isidro, Buenos Aires, Argentina
- Height: 1.76 m (5 ft 9 in)
- Position: Midfielder

Senior career*
Years	Team	Apps	(Gls)
1998–2000	Vélez Sarsfield	9	(0)
1999–2000	Sarmiento	4	(0)
2000–2001	Atlético Rafaela	7	(0)
2001–2002	Excursionistas		
2002	San Marcos		
2003	Merlo		
2004–2005	Defensores de Belgrano	14	(0)
2004	→ Talleres (RE)	4	(0)
2005–2006	Huracán de Tres Arroyos	8	(0)
2006–2007	Compostela		
2007–2008	PSS Sleman		
2008–2009	Huracán	8	(0)
2009–2011	San Telmo	2	(0)
2011	Real Mataram		
2013	Rosamonte	1	(0)
- * Club domestic league appearances and goals

Juan Darío Batalla (born September 18, 1979) is an Argentine footballer who played domestically for Vélez Sársfield (1996–1998), Sarmiento de Junín (1999–2000), Atlético Rafaela (2000–2001), Excursionistas (2001–2002), Deportivo Merlo (2003), Talleres (RE) (2004), Defensores de Belgrano (2004–2005), Huracán de Tres Arroyos (2005–2006), Huracán de Comodoro Rivadavia (2008–2009) and San Telmo (2009–2011), for Chilean club San Marcos de Arica (2002), for Spanish club Compostela (2006–2007), and in Indonesia for PSS Sleman (2007–2008) and Real Mataram of the Liga Premier (2011–2012).
