= Bruno Pezzella =

Argentine footballer

Personal information
- Full name: Bruno Pezzella
- Date of birth: 11 January 1990 (age 36)
- Place of birth: Bahía Blanca, Argentina
- Height: 1.73 m (5 ft 8 in)
- Position: Midfielder

Youth career
- Kilómetro 5
- Juventud Unida
- Olimpo
- Bella Vista

Senior career*
Years	Team	Apps	(Gls)
2006–2008	Bella Vista	–	(–)
2008–2010	Aldosivi		
2010	Luján de Cuyo	10	(0)
2010	Defensores de Belgrano		
2011	Central Español		
2011–2012	Belgrano	0	(0)
2012	San Luis	12	(1)
2013	Unión La Calera	0	(0)
2013–2014	Almagro		
2014	Barracas Central	1	(0)
2015	Santamarina	4	(0)
2016	Deportivo Roca	12	(0)
2016–2017	Akragas	30	(1)
2017	Messina	11	(1)
2018	Gżira United	0	(0)
2018	Ercolanese	0	(0)
2018	Nuova Napoli Nord	9	(0)
2018–2019	Sansinena	13	(0)
- * Club domestic league appearances and goals

Bruno Pezzella (born 22 December 1988 in Bahía Blanca, Argentina) is an Argentine former footballer who played as a midfielder.

== Career ==
Born in Bahía Blanca, Pezzella began playing football in the youth system of local side Club Olimpo alongside his brother, Germán. He played for several clubs in Argentina, including a brief spell in the Primera B Nacional with Club y Biblioteca Ramón Santamarina. Compatriot Sergio Bernardo Almirón brought him to Sicilian club S.S. Akragas Città dei Templi in 2016.

=== Teams ===
- (Argentina) Bella Vista 2006–2008
- (Argentina) Aldosivi 2008–2010
- (Argentina) Luján de Cuyo 2010
- (Argentina) Defensores de Belgrano 2010
- (Uruguay) Central Español 2011
- (Argentina) Belgrano 2011–2012
- (Chile) San Luis de Quillota 2012
- (Chile) Unión La Calera 2013
- (Argentina) Almagro 2013–2014
- (Argentina) Barracas Central 2014
- (Argentina) Santamarina 2015
- (Argentina) Deportivo Roca 2016
- (Italy) Akragas 2016–2017
- (Italy) Messina 2017
- (Malta) Gżira United 2018
- (Italy) Ercolanese 2018
- (Italy) Nuova Napoli Nord 2018
- (Argentina) Sansinena 2018–2019
