= Leandro Zárate =

Argentine footballer

Personal information
- Full name: Leandro Sebastián Zárate
- Date of birth: 31 March 1984 (age 42)
- Place of birth: Córdoba, Argentina
- Height: 1.87 m (6 ft 2 in)
- Position: Centre forward

Team information
- Current team: Gimnasia y Tiro

Senior career*
Years	Team	Apps	(Gls)
2003	Talleres de Córdoba		
2004	Racing de Córdoba		
2004–2005	CS Ben Hur		
2005–2006	Argentinos Juniors	4	(0)
2006	Defensa y Justicia		
2007	Atlético Tucumán		
2007–2008	Unión Santa Fe	37	(16)
2008	Botafogo	7	(2)
2009–2010	Instituto ACC	31	(6)
2010–2011	Unión Santa Fe	16	(3)
2011–2012	Racing de Córdoba		
2012–	Gimnasia y Tiro	83	(34)
- * Club domestic league appearances and goals as of 27 May 2015

Leandro Sebastián Zárate (born 31 March 1984 in Córdoba) is an Argentine professional footballer who plays as a forward for Gimnasia y Tiro.

== Career ==
Zárate has played in Argentina for Talleres de Córdoba, Racing de Córdoba, CS Ben Hur, Argentinos Juniors, Defensa y Justicia, Atlético Tucumán and Unión de Santa Fe, and in Brazil for Botafogo
