= Hernán Mattiuzzo =

Argentine footballer

Personal information
- Full name: Hernán Alejandro Mattiuzzo
- Date of birth: 28 April 1984 (age 42)
- Place of birth: Buenos Aires, Argentina
- Height: 1.85 m (6 ft 1 in)
- Position: Midfielder

Team information
- Current team: Platense

Senior career*
Years	Team	Apps	(Gls)
2002–2005	San Lorenzo	8	(0)
2005–2009	Nueva Chicago	81	(2)
2009–2010	Almagro	28	(0)
2010–2011	Huracán CR	17	(2)
2012	San Martín de Tucumán	15	(1)
2012–	Platense	52	(0)
- * Club domestic league appearances and goals as of 11:55, 28 may 2014 (UTC)

Hernán Alejandro Mattiuzzo (born 28 April 1984 in Buenos Aires) is an Argentine football midfielder who plays for Nueva Chicago in the Primera B Metropolitana.

== Club career ==
Mattiuzzo previously played for San Lorenzo and Nueva Chicago in the Primera Division Argentina. In January 2007, Mattiuzzo suffered a serious knee injury which prevented him from playing for six months.

== International career ==
Mattiuzzo played for the Argentina national football team at the 2001 FIFA U-17 World Championship in Trinidad and Tobago.
