= Ivo Hongn =

Argentine footballer

Personal information
- Full name: Ivo Hongn
- Date of birth: 28 May 1991 (age 35)
- Place of birth: Córdoba, Argentina
- Height: 1.59 m (5 ft 2 1/2 in)
- Position: Forward

Senior career*
Years	Team	Apps	(Gls)
2010–2013	Talleres	9	(0)
2013–2015	Sarmiento		
2015	Sportivo Atenas	13	(3)
2016	Sarmiento		
2017	Pacífico		
2017–2018	Tigre	3	(0)
2018–2020	Huracán Las Heras	39	(7)
- * Club domestic league appearances and goals as of 19:14, 3 November 2020 (UTC)

Ivo Hongn (born 28 May 1991) is an Argentine professional footballer who plays as a forward.

== Career ==
Talleres were Hongn's first club, he began appearing for the club in 2010. He subsequently made nine appearances across three years with Talleres, four coming in his final season of 2012–13; which ended with promotion from Torneo Argentino A. Hongn departed Talleres in 2013 for a three-year spell with Sarmiento, either side of a stint with fellow Torneo Federal B team Sportivo Atenas in 2015. He left Sarmiento in 2016, following thirty-seven games and five goals across two spells. He then signed for Pacífico, though joined Argentine Primera División side Tigre in July 2017. He made his pro debut on 15 September vs. Patronato.

Huracán Las Heras of Torneo Federal A became Hongn's sixth career club in July 2018.

== Career statistics ==
As of 9 September 2018.

Club statistics
Club	Season	League			Cup (Note: Includes the Copa Argentina)		League Cup		Continental		Other		Total	
Club	Season	Division	Apps	Goals	Apps	Goals	Apps	Goals	Apps	Goals	Apps	Goals	Apps	Goals
Talleres	2012–13	Torneo Argentino A	4	0	2	0	—		—		0	0	6	0
Sportivo Atenas	2015	Torneo Federal B	13	3	0	0	—		—		0	0	13	3
Tigre	2017–18	Primera División	3	0	0	0	—		—		0	0	3	0
Huracán Las Heras	2018–19	Torneo Federal A	0	0	0	0	—		—		0	0	0	0
Career total			20	3	2	0	—		—		0	0	22	3

== Honours ==
Talleres

- Torneo Argentino A: 2012–13
