= Rodolfo Motta =

Argentine footballer (1944–2014)

Rodolfo Motta (11 July 1944 – 4 August 2014) was an Argentine football player and coach. He played for clubs like Sportivo Italiano, Deportivo Español.

== Early life ==
Motta was born in the Mataderos neighborhood of Buenos Aires. He began playing football with local side Club Atlético Nueva Chicago, where he would play in the Argentine Primera División during the 1960s.

== Career ==
Motta played football in the Primera B Nacional with Sportivo Italiano, Deportivo Español, Deportivo Morón, Excursionistas, Quilmes Atlético Club and Estudiantes de Buenos Aires.

After he retired from playing, Motta became a football manager. His first appointment was with Estudiantes de Buenos Aires in 1982. Next, he managed his first club, Nueva Chicago. He later managed clubs in Peru (Sporting Cristal) and Ecuador (C.S. Emelec). During his managerial career he coached few other clubs, including Temperley, Platense, Racing de Córdoba, Ferro Carril Oeste etc.

== Death ==
Motta died on 4 August 2014 in Buenos Aires, at the age of 70.
