= Cristian Milla =

Argentine footballer

Personal information
- Full name: Cristian Humberto Milla
- Date of birth: 9 June 1984 (age 42)
- Place of birth: Buenos Aires, Argentina
- Height: 1.77 m (5 ft 10 in)
- Position: Striker

Youth career
- 2001–2002: Chacarita Juniors

Senior career*
Years	Team	Apps	(Gls)
2002–2008	Chacarita Juniors	75	(26)
2007	→ Almagro (loan)	26	(4)
2008–2010	Universidad de Chile	21	(5)
2009	→ Chacarita Juniors (loan)	12	(1)
2010	→ Almagro (loan)	1	(1)
2010–2011	Defensa y Justicia	9	(1)
2011	Rangers	36	(27)
2011–2012	Cobreloa	12	(3)
2012–2013	Defensa y Justicia	35	(16)
2013–2014	Arsenal de Sarandí	5	(0)
2014	Huachipato	3	(0)
2014–2015	Huracán	12	(2)
2015–2016	Chacarita Juniors	19	(3)
2016–2017	Flandria	6	(0)
2017–2018	Fénix	23	(6)
2018–2019	Berazategui	28	(4)
2020–2021	San Martín Burzaco	5	(0)
2021	Sportivo Italiano	19	(4)
Total		347	(103)
- * Club domestic league appearances and goals

Cristian Humberto Milla (Spanish pronunciation: [ˈkɾistjan umˈbeɾto ˈmiʎa], born 9 June 1984) is an Argentine former footballer who played as a striker.

== Club career ==
Milla began his career in the youth system of Chacarita Juniors. After a loan spell with Almagro he joined Universidad de Chile in July 2008.

In 2009 Chacarita Juniors were promoted to the Primera División and Milla was loaned back to the club by Universidad de Chile. In 2010, he returned to Universidad de Chile, and later in August he was released from the Chilean team after reaching an agreement with the club.

He announced his retirement in February 2022 after playing for Sportivo Italiano in the Argentine Primera C.

== Honours ==
- Primera División de Chile (1): 2009 Apertura
