= Juan Gabriel Rivas =

Argentine footballer

Personal information
- Full name: Juan Gabriel Rivas
- Date of birth: 14 August 1992 (age 34)
- Place of birth: Santa Fe, Argentina
- Height: 1.85 m (6 ft 1 in)
- Position: Midfielder

Senior career*
Years	Team	Apps	(Gls)
2010–2016	Unión de Santa Fe	53	(2)
2012–2013	→ Deportivo Merlo (loan)	22	(0)
2016–2017	Unión Española	15	(0)
2018	Aucas	10	(0)
2018	América de Quito	22	(0)
2019	Central Norte	12	(0)
- * Club domestic league appearances and goals as of 29 March 2020

Juan Gabriel Rivas (born 14 August 1992) is an Argentine professional footballer who plays as a midfielder.

Rivas played for teams like Chile's Unión Española and Ecuadorian side América de Quito.
