= Jorge González (Argentine footballer) =

Argentine footballer

Personal information
- Full name: Jorge Alfredo González
- Date of birth: August 24, 1988 (age 38)
- Place of birth: Buenos Aires, Argentina
- Position: Striker

Team information
- Current team: Barracas Central

Youth career
- Atlanta

Senior career*
| Years | Team | Apps | (Gls) |
| 2008–2009 | Atlanta | | |
| 2009–2010 | Cienciano | 4 | (0) |
| 2010 | River Plate | 4 | (1) |
| 2010 | Barracas Central | 6 | (0) |
- * Club domestic league appearances and goals

Jorge Alfredo González (born September 30, 1977, in Argentina) is an Argentine footballer who currently pays for Barracas Central in the Argentine Primera B Metropolitana.

== Club career ==
In August, 2010 he was transferred from Puerto Rican side River Plate to Barracas Central.
