= Estadio Municipal de Comodoro Rivadavia =

Football stadium in Comodoro Rivadavia, Argentina

Comodoro Rivadavia Municipal Stadium
- Estadio Municipal de Comodoro Rivadavia
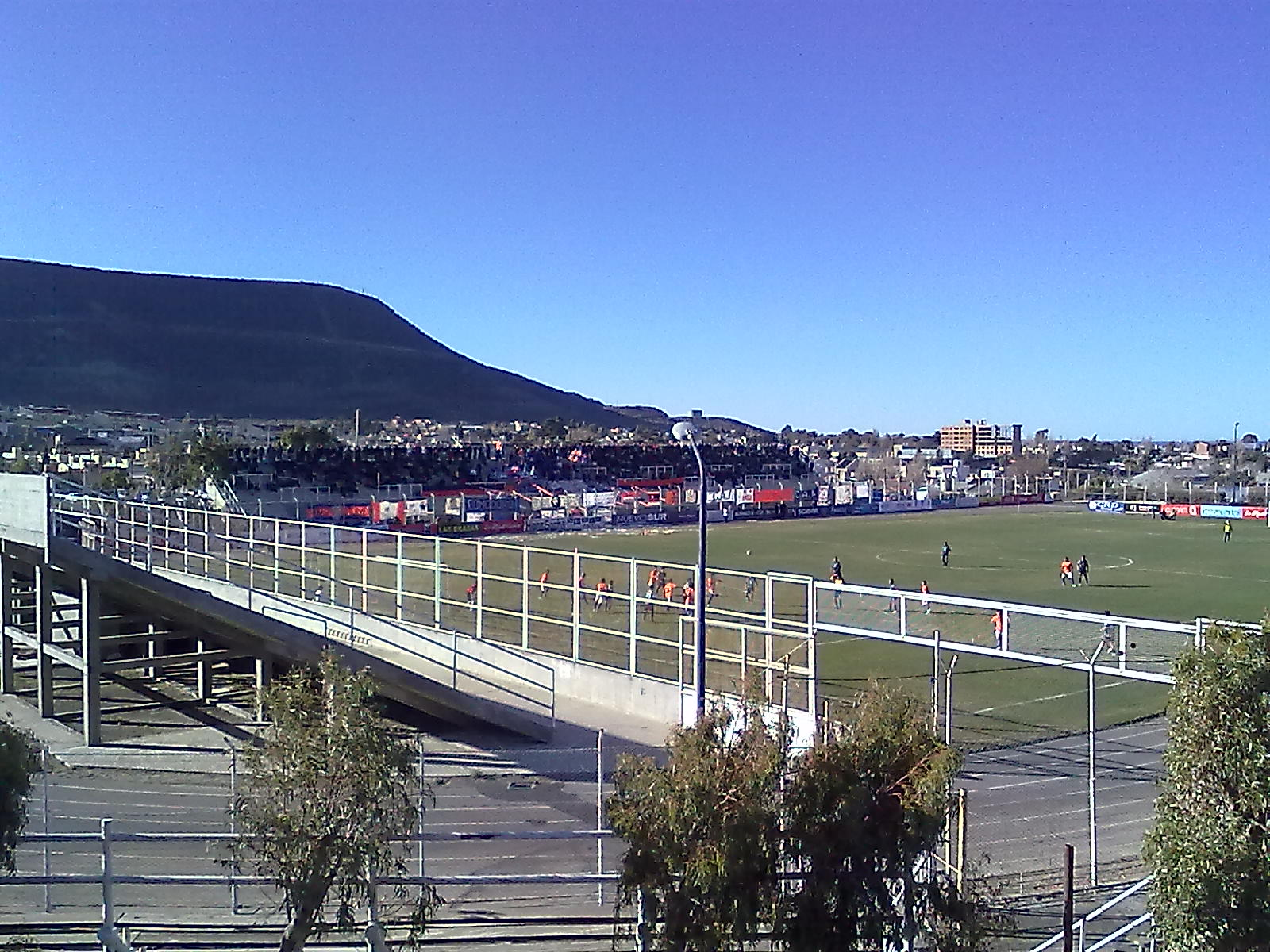
- The stadium in 2010
- Interactive map of Comodoro Rivadavia; Municipal Stadium
- Former names: Estadio YPF
- Address: Fray Luis Beltrán 5350 – Comodoro Rivadavia; Argentina
- Owner: Municipality of Comodoro Rivadavia
- Capacity: 8,300
- Type: Stadium
- Surface: Grass

Construction
- Opened: 1942

Tenants
- Comisión de Actividades Infantiles; Huracán (CR); Jorge Newbery (CR)

Estadio Municipal de Comodoro Rivadavia (also named Estadio Km. 3) is a football stadium located in the city of Comodoro Rivadavia in the Chubut Province of Argentina. It is owned by the local Municipality (and opereated through its "Ente Autárquico Comodoro Deportes") and was opened in 1975. The stadium has a capacity of 8,300 spectators, and was refurbished to build press booths.

The stadium was built by local oil company YPF and opened in 1942, and has served as home venue for some local football clubs such as Comisión de Actividades Infantiles, Huracán (CR), and Jorge Newbery.

== Overview ==
The stadium was built by local oil company YPF as a venue for its sporting events, named "YPF Olympic Games", which had been first held in early 1930s. Clubs in Comodoro Rivadavia totalised more than 1,300 members, with 43% being employees and workers of YPF. The YPF Games were contested by employees of the company along with their families. Sports included athletics, basketball, football, swimming, tennis, and chess. "Estadio YPF" as it was originally named, was opened in 1942.

The stadium also has a running track, regarded as "the birth of Patagonian athletics" and one of the best tracks in the country during its best years. The stadium hosted the National Athletics Championship in 1964 and 1979. The track was rebuilt in 2007, and refurbished in 2013.

Other events hosted at Estadio Municipal include concerts, and other local events organised by the Municipality.

In July 2023, the Municipality inaugurated Hotel Deportivo de Km. 3, a hotel exclusively for athletes, with capacity for 200 guests. The complex is located behind the stadium.
