= Julio Serrano =

Retired Argentine footballer

Personal information
- Full name: Julio Cesar Serrano
- Date of birth: 1 March 1981 (age 45)
- Place of birth: La Matanza, Argentina
- Height: 1.81 m (5 ft 11 in)
- Position: Midfielder

Senior career*
Years	Team	Apps	(Gls)
1996–1998	Sacachispas		
1999–2005	Nueva Chicago		
2005–2006	Almagro		
2006–2007	Instituto		
2007	Nueva Chicago	18	(2)
2008–2010	Slovan Bratislava	44	(1)
2010–2012	Nueva Chicago		
2013–2014	Estudiantes	55	(10)
2015	Atlanta	28	(4)
2015	UAI Urquiza	9	(1)
2016–2017	Sacachispas	30	(2)
2018–2019	General Lamadrid		
- * Club domestic league appearances and goals as of 21 May 2015

Julio Cesar Serrano (born 1 March 1981) is an Argentine football midfielder who last played for Club Atlético General Lamadrid in Argentina. He was traded to Slovan Bratislava from the Argentine club Nueva Chicago in January 2008.
