= Mariano Torresi =

Argentine footballer

Personal information
- Full name: Luis Mariano Torresi
- Date of birth: 26 January 1981 (age 45)
- Place of birth: Mendoza, Argentina
- Height: 1.75 m (5 ft 9 in)
- Position: Midfielder

Team information
- Current team: Atlético Uruguay

Youth career
- Godoy Cruz

Senior career*
Years	Team	Apps	(Gls)
1998–2008	Godoy Cruz	204	(28)
2003–2004	→ Newell's Old Boys (loan)	0	
2007–2008	→ Apollon Limassol (loan)	23	(3)
2009–2010	San Martín de San Juan	37	(11)
2010–2011	Instituto	23	(1)
2011–2012	Estudiantes		
2012–2014	Barracas Central	26	(4)
2013–2014	→ Deportivo Merlo (loan)	39	(7)
2014–2015	Libertad	13	(1)
2015	Club Cipolletti	31	(10)
2016–2017	Gimnasia CdU	24	(3)
2018–	Atlético Uruguay	?	(?)
- * Club domestic league appearances and goals as of 17 May 2018

Luis Mariano Torresi (born 26 January 1981) is an Argentine footballer who plays as a midfielder. He currently plays for Atlético Uruguay.
