= Jorge Newbery de Comodoro Rivadavia =

Newbery
- Full name: Club Atlético Jorge Newbery
- Nickname(s): El Lobo
- Founded: 19 April 1924
- Ground: Estadio Jorge Newbery, Comodoro Rivadavia, Chubut Province, Argentina
- Capacity: 5,000
- Chairman: Pablo Barrientos
- Manager: Hugo Barrientos
- League: Torneo Regional Federal Amateur
- 2011–12: 6th (Zone 1)
- Website: http://www.newberycomodoro.com.ar/
Home colours	Away colours

Club Atlético Jorge Newbery, familiarly known as Newbery is an Argentine Football club, located in the city of Comodoro Rivadavia, Chubut.

== History ==
The Club Atlético Jorge Newbery was officially established on 19 April 1924 as "Nacional Foot-Ball Club". The club formed from the merge of two clubs from the city: Sportivo Rivadavia and Correos y Telégrafos. On 23 May 1934 the club was forced to change its name because of a decree promulgated by de facto President of Argentina Agustín Pedro Justo. That decree established the prohibition of using the word "National" in any entity or particular association.

On 30 June 1934 an assembly was held to rename the institution. One of the proposals was "Argentinos del Sud" although the club finally chose the name "Jorge Newbery" as a tribute to the most important sportsman to date.

The first match as Jorge Newbery was played on 8 July 1934, beating Gimnasia y Esgrima 3–1. That same year the club began to build its sports field, which lasted until 2008 when Jorge Newbery opened its new facilities.
