= Hugo Barrientos =

Argentine footballer and coach

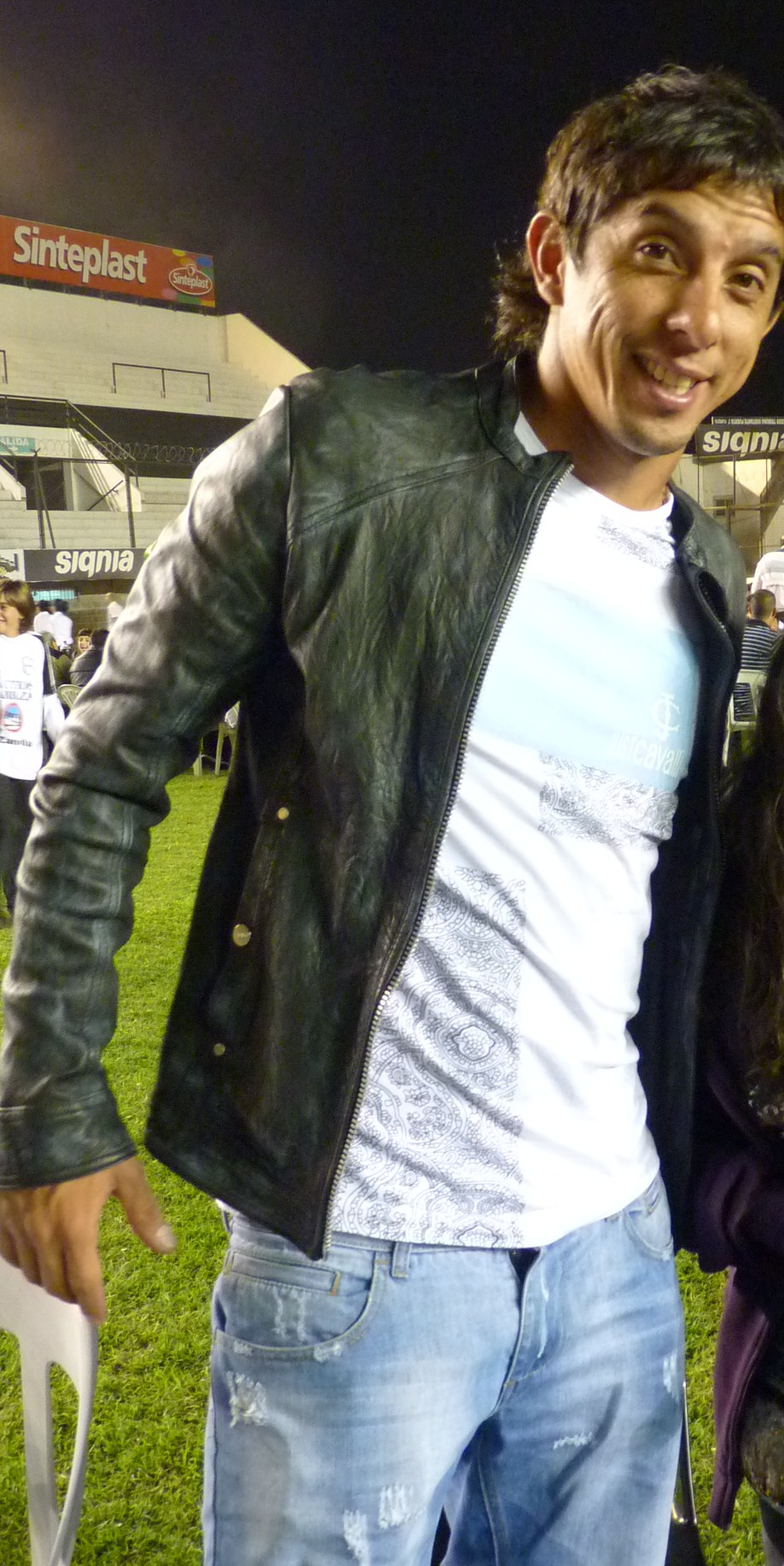

Personal information
- Full name: Hugo Alberto Barrientos
- Date of birth: January 3, 1977 (age 49)
- Place of birth: Comodoro Rivadavia, Argentina
- Height: 1.74 m (5 ft 9 in)
- Position: Defensive midfielder

Senior career*
Years	Team	Apps	(Gls)
1994–1998	C.A.I	12	(2)
2000–2004	Atlético de Rafaela	85	(11)
2004–2005	Olimpo	5	(0)
2005–2006	Instituto de Córdoba	34	(1)
2006–2009	Huracán	73	(4)
2009–2010	Newell's Old Boys	20	(0)
2010–2012	All Boys	55	(2)
2012–2013	Huracán	29	(0)
2013–2014	Platense	14	(0)
2014	C.A.I	11	(1)

Managerial career
- 2014–2015: Club Jorge Newbery
- 2017–2018: Club Jorge Newbery
- 2018: Guillermo Brown
- * Club domestic league appearances and goals

Hugo Alberto Barrientos (born 3 January 1977 in Comodoro Rivadavia) is a retired Argentine football midfielder and current football coach.

== Career ==
Barrientos started his playing career in 1994 with C.A.I in the lower leagues of Argentine football.

In 2000 Barrientos joined Atlético de Rafaela of the 2nd division and in 2002-2003 the club won the division and obtained promotion to the Argentine Primera.

Atlético was relegated after one season, but Barrientos stayed in the Argentine Primera Division, playing for Olimpo de Bahía Blanca and then Instituto de Córdoba.

In 2006 Barrientos signed for Huracán and was part of the squad that won promotion to the Primera at the end of the 2006–2007 season. Barrientos has served as the on-pitch captain of Huracán on several occasions.

In 2009 Barrientos was released by Huracán, he then moved to Rosario to join Newell's Old Boys.

== Titles ==
Season	Team	Title
2002–2003	Atlético de Rafaela	Primera B Nacional
