= Bella Vista de Bahía Blanca =

Argentine football club

Club Bella Vista
- Full name: Club Bella Vista de Bahía Blanca
- Nickname(s): Los Gallegos, Albiverdes
- Founded: 18 April 1921; 104 years ago
- Ground: Estadio Ignacio Nicolás, Bahía Blanca, Buenos Aires Province
- Capacity: 4,000
- Chairman: Jorge López
- Manager: Horacio Schumacher
- League: Torneo Regional Federal Amateur
- 2020: Región Bonaerense Pampeana Sur
| Home colours | Away colours |

Club Bella Vista is an Argentine football club located in the city of Bahía Blanca, in Buenos Aires Province. The team currently plays in Torneo Regional Federal Amateur, the regionalised 4th level of the Argentine football league system.

The most notable player in the club history is Alfio Basile, who went on to become manager of the Argentina national football team, leading them to two Copa América titles.
