= Estadio Parque Barrio Ilolay =

Football stadium in Rafaela, Argentina

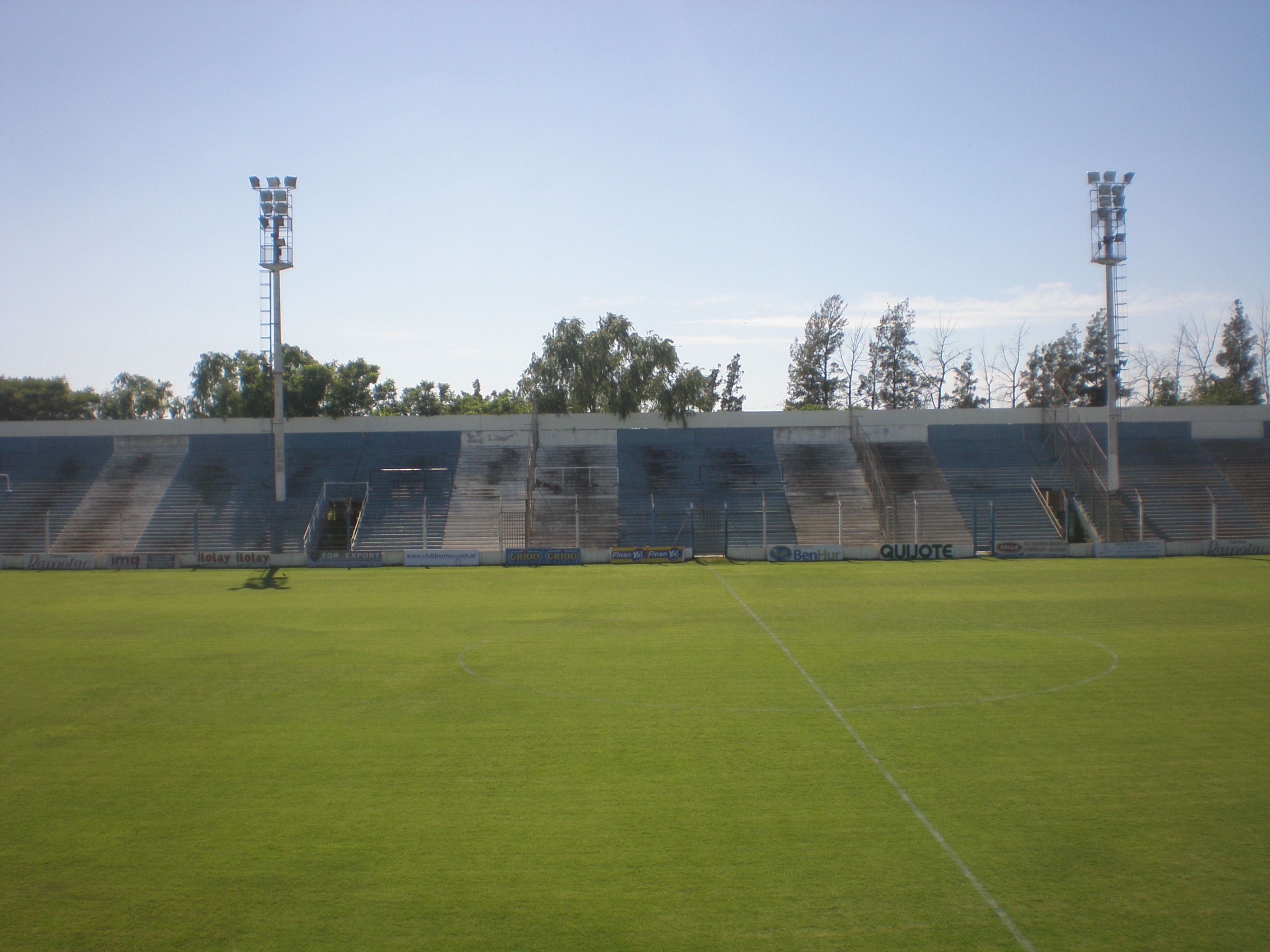
Estadio-parque-bh.JPG

Estadio Parque Barrio Ilolay is a multi-use stadium in Rafaela, Argentina. It is currently used primarily for football matches by Club Sportivo Ben Hur. The stadium has a capacity of 12,000 people.
