= Huracán de Comodoro Rivadavia =

Argentine football club

Huracán
- Full name: Club Atlético Huracán
- Nickname: Globito Petrolero (Oiler Little Ballon)
- Founded: December 22, 1927
- Ground: Estadio César Muñoz, Comodoro Rivadavia, Chubut Province, Argentina
- Capacity: 10,000
- Chairman: ARG Gustavo Canciller
- Coach: Argentina Jorge Montesino
- 2010–11: 14th
- Website: https://web.archive.org/web/20090707094253/http://www.huracandecomodoro.com.ar/
Away colours

Club Atlético Huracán, mostly known as Huracán de Comodoro Rivadavia is an Argentine football club, located in the city of Comodoro Rivadavia, Chubut.

== Torneo Nacional ==
The club played at the highest level of Argentine football on three occasions, when qualified to play in the National tournaments disputed on 1971, 1974 and 1976.

In 1971, Huracán finished at the bottom position of the table, after a poor campaign that set a record of:

- Played: 14
- Won: 1 – Tied: 1 – Lost: 12
- Goals scored: 11
- Goals received: 55
- Total points: 3

In the Nacional 1974, Huracán finished 6th in a group of nine teams. The most notable result of the season was a 4–0 win over their more illustrious namesakes Club Atlético Huracán from Buenos Aires.

The 1976 Nacional was Huracán's most successful campaign. The team finished 5th of 9, having achieved some notable results such as a 1–0 victory over Newell's Old Boys and a 4–0 win against Platense.

== Team 2022 ==
Actually 11/december/2022 Note: Flags indicate national team as defined under FIFA eligibility rules; some limited exceptions apply. Players may hold more than one non-FIFA nationality.

No.	Pos.	Nation	Player
18	FW	ARG	Justo Sosa

== See also ==
- List of football clubs in Argentina
- Argentine football league system
