= Club Sportivo Ben Hur =

Ben Hur
- Full name: Club Sportivo Ben Hur
- Nicknames: Azul; Lobo del Sur; La BH
- Founded: 17 June 1940; 85 years ago
- Ground: Estadio Parque Barrio Ilolay
- Capacity: 12,000
- League: Torneo Argentino B
- 2011–12: 4th of Zona D (eliminated on second stage)
Home colours	Away colours

Club Sportivo Ben Hur is an Argentine sports club from Rafaela, Santa Fe Province. The club was founded in 1940 and is mostly known for its basketball and football teams.

Other sports practised in the club are aerobics, bowls, chess, field hockey, and swimming.

== Basketball ==
Basketball is the sport that gave the most important successes to the club, winning the 2004–05 national championship, and the Liga Sudamericana 2006 among other titles. The club's indoor arena is the Coliseo del Sur.

=== Titles ===
- Liga Nacional de Básquet: 1

2004–05

- Liga Sudamericana: 1

2006

- Torneo Nacional de Ascenso: 1

2001–02

- Liga Federativa C: 1

1994–95

== Football ==
The club inaugurated its first football field on 7 April 1946. In its early years, Ben Hur started playing in the local league of Rafaela, but it was not until 1997 when Ben Hur left the regional tournaments to join the Argentine Football Association. The club subsequently won the Torneo Argentino A (the regionalized third division of the Argentine football league system) in 2004 promoting to Primera B Nacional. Then Ben Hur would be relegated to upper divisions and currently plays in the Torneo Regional Federal Amateur.

Ber Hur football stadium is the Estadio Parque Barrio Ilolay.

=== Titles ===
- Torneo Argentino A: 1

2004–05

- Torneo Argentino C: 1

1996–97
