= Pringles (disambiguation) =

Pringles or Coronel Pringles may refer to:

- Pringles, a brand of potato snack
- Pringles Park, a minor league baseball stadium located in Jackson, Tennessee, United States.
- Coronel Pringles, a town in the south of the Buenos Aires Province in Argentina
- Coronel Pringles Partido is a political division in Buenos Aires Province, Argentina
- Coronel Pringles Department is a political division in San Luis Province, Argentina
- Juan Pascual Pringles, a distinguished military leader in the Spanish American wars of independence
- Yevgeny Prigozhin, a Russian oligarch and former leader of the Wagner Group
