= Indio Rico =

Coordinates: 38°20′S 60°53′W

- Interactive map of Indio Rico
- Province: Buenos Aires
- Founded: 1929
- Founded by: Maria Bernasconi

Population (2001)
  - Total: 1,165
- Demonym: indiorricense
- Website: www.coronelpringles.gov.ar

Indio Rico is a small town in southern Buenos Aires Province, Argentina, located in the district of Coronel Pringles.

== Location ==
It is 73 km (45 mi) southeast of the capital city Coronel Pringles, and 63 km (39 mi) from the city of Tres Arroyos. It is reached by Provincial Route 85 from which it is 11 km (6.8 mi) along a fully surfaced road.

== Toponymy ==
The name comes from the creek that passes within 7 km (4.3 mi) of the town, its Indian name would be "Quetru Queyu" or "Guetzu-güeyu", words meaning "place of the caldenes". While researchers believe the term "rich Indian", is related to ulmen in the Mapuche language: powerful cacique, or rich chief.

== History ==
The site now occupied by the city had a history of native Indian attacks, a notable one occurring on June 14, 1870. The attack started when numerous natives attacked a military garrison in the area, leading to the deaths of many. The development of a general industrial factory by John P. Alchurrut at the end of the 19th century was one of the first attempts at populating the site. On December 7, 1929, the LDS Railways opened Indio Rico station for cargo, passengers and livestock. On 19 February the following year the provincial Parliament approved the creation of a center of population, based on land donated by Maria Bernasconi, and with the auction of 300 parcels of land and 58 detached houses families could settle and protect themselves. Later this was complemented by a second auction of 418 plots and 108 houses.

Rail service to the town ended in 1993. In 2017, the Argentinean government declared Indio Rico a tourist town.

== Economy ==
Its main activity is agriculture and livestock. Near the town is the "Indio Rico" pressure plant on two major gas pipelines belonging to TGS and the "Indio Rico" Pumping Station on a major oil pipeline of REPSOL-YPF.

== Population ==
INDEC had 1165 inhabitants at 2001, which represents an increase of 15.6% compared to the 1008 from the previous census in 1991.

== Education ==
The town has preschool, primary and secondary school levels.

== Sports and social ==
The Indio Rico Athletic and Social Club and the Once Corazones (Eleven Hearts) Club serve a social activity centers.

They stand out for their provision of traditional events, such as "Bucking and Riders" organized by Eleven Hearts or "Traditional Carnival," with parades of floats, barbecues and art shows held yearly in Rincon Criollo.

Eleven Hearts Club has football as its principal sport, participating in the Tresarroyo Regional League in the first Division 1994 to date, Bochas, a form of bowls, is also practiced in their own alleys.

The Indio Rico Athletic and Social Club, has a unique sport, the Paddle.

== Religion ==
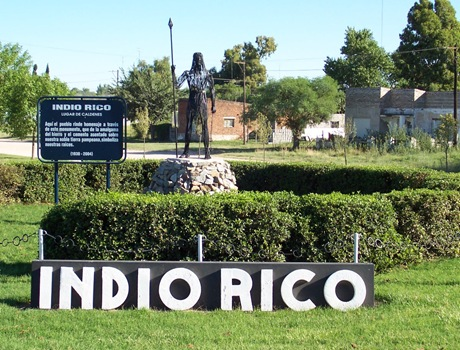
The Indian.

The parish of Our Lady of Carmen opened in 1940. The church contains a 24 m (79 ft)-tall tower where visitors can view the town.

At the entrance of the town is a shrine dedicated to the Virgen del Carmen and a monument to Indian sculpture in wrought iron of 2.1 m (6 ft 11 in).

== Media ==
- Radio Fm Aboriginal 105.3 MHz
- Digital Aboriginal
- Agricultural Regional Magazine Campo Total (Total Field)
- Cablevision
- Daily newspapers available:

- La Voz del Pueblo de Tresarroyos (The Voice of Tres Arroyos)
- El Diario de Pringles (The Pringles Daily)
- La Nueva Provincia of Bahia Blanca (The New Province de Bahia Blanca)
