= Orense, Buenos Aires =

Orense
- Town
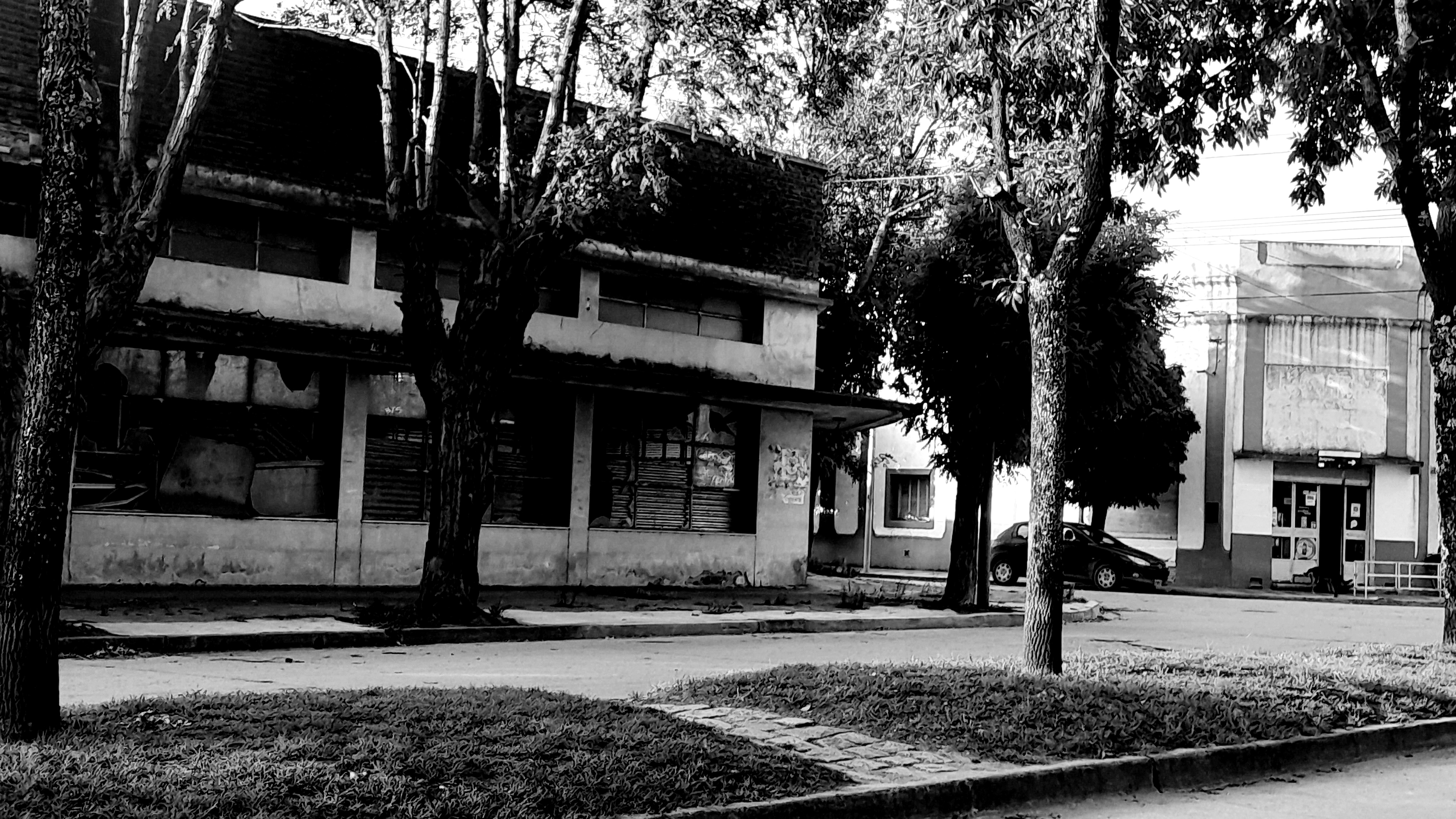
- Intersection in the town, 2024

- Location within Buenos Aires Province
- Coordinates: 38°40′S 59°47′W
- Country: Argentina
- Province: Buenos Aires
- Partidos: Tres Arroyos
- Established: December 9, 1913
- Elevation: 31 m (102 ft)

Population (2001 Census)
  - Total: 2,176
- Time zone: UTC−3 (ART)
- CPA Base: B 8013
- Climate: Dfc

Orense is a town located in the Tres Arroyos Partido in the province of Buenos Aires, Argentina. The main town is located near the Atlantic Ocean, with a smaller coastal community located on the shore. Formerly a major agricultural center, the town's coast has become a center for tourism.

== Geography ==
Orense is located 560 km (350 mi) from the city of Buenos Aires. It occupies a roughly 23 km (14 mi)-long coastline.

== History ==
Orense was founded in December 9, 1913 upon the construction of a railway station. The town was founded on 572 ha (1,410 acres) of land purchased from a farmer in the region. In 1929, a spa town was founded just south of Orense on the coast, which has a permanent population of around 70, a number which swells considerably to around 4,000 during the months of January and February. Alongside the villages of Claromecó and Reta, Orense is part of a roughly 100 km (62 mi) stretch of coastline which makes up the southern portion of the Tres Arroyos Partido.

The first homes were built on the coast in the 1930s, while a fishing club was opened in 1955, four years after the layout of the town was approved. In total, 228 lots were auctioned off for use in 1951. The Grotto of the Virgin of Lourdes, a religious center, was built in 1976. The area is also known for having several notable lagoons and streams, and other natural and constructed features along the coast.

The original town of Orense became a center for agriculture and agricultural tool production, which led to a company based in the town, La Palma, receiving a national award in 1967. In 1918, around 850,000 tons of cereal left the town's rail station. Rail service ended in 1961.

== Population ==
Orense's population peaked at around 4,500 residents, a number which has since fallen considerably. According to INDEC, which collects population data for the country, the town had a population of 2,176 people as of the 2001 census.
