= Jake Jabs College of Business and Entrepreneurship =

Business school of Montana State University

Coordinates: 45.66894°N 111.04873°W

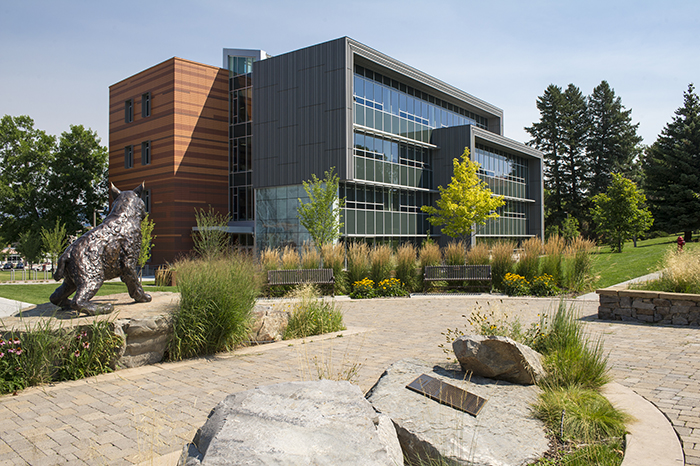
- Jabs Hall
- Former name: School of Business
- Type: Public Business School
- Established: 1893
- Affiliations: Montana State University
- Dean: Brian Gillespie (since 2024)
- Academic staff: 72
- Undergraduates: 1569
- Postgraduates: 41
- Location: Bozeman, Montana, United States
- Website: www.montana.edu/business

The Jake Jabs College of Business & Entrepreneurship (JJCBE), previously known as the MSU College of Business is the business school of Montana State University, a public land-grant university located in Bozeman, Montana. The college offers a Bachelor of Science in Business degree at the undergraduate level and a Master of Professional Accountancy (MPAc) degree as well as a Master of Science in Innovation and Management (MSIM) at the graduate level. The college is named for MSU alumnus Jake Jabs, president and CEO of American Furniture Warehouse who donated $25 million in 2011 to the university to modernize the college.

== About ==
The Jake Jabs College of Business and Entrepreneurship offers a Bachelor of Science undergraduate degree in business with four option areas: accounting, finance, management, and marketing. The college offers five minors: accounting, business administration, entrepreneurship and small business management, finance, and international business, as well as an 18-credit business certificate and 15-credit entrepreneurship certificate. The college offers a one-year Master of Professional Accountancy program (MPAc) and a one-year Master of Science in Innovation and Management (MSIM). The college is accredited through the Association to Advance Collegiate Schools of Business (AACSB). As a part of Montana State University, the college operates on a semester system. The college is directly managed by a Dean (currently Brian Gillespie), who is advised by a National Board of Advisors composed of alumni and other business professionals.

== History ==
When the Agricultural College of the State of Montana (now Montana State University) was established in 1893, the first college catalog announced a division of business that would include "book-keeping, commercial arithmetic, commercial correspondence, penmanship, commercial law, and business ethics, etc." The first class offered at the new college was a business course offered by Homer G. Phelps, who had been conducting business institutes in Bozeman and Livingston, Montana. Initially the business curriculum was supported by the college to ensure that women would enroll. Economics and agricultural economics would eventually provide a more theoretical approach to some of the business subjects, but in the beginning, typewriting, shorthand, business machine operation, and office management constituted the basic courses. The secretarial and business options maintained a strong attraction for years, but in time, Leona Barnes, Bernice Lamb, John Blankenhorn, Alfred Day, and Harvey Larson presided over the transition to a truly professional business curriculum. It wasn't until 1958–1959, when the department of commerce emerged to join with the new College of Professional Schools. While general business remained the most popular option, accounting attracted an increasing number of students. In 1975, the core areas of the school were realigned and emphasis was placed on accounting, finance, management, marketing, and international trade.

In 1981, the School of Business received accreditation. When data became available in the early 1980s, it was discovered that Harold Holen's accounting program had achieved top rankings nationwide in the percentage of students taking and passing the CPA exam.

In October 2011, the university announced what was then the largest private gift in the history of the Montana higher education system─$25 million from MSU alumnus Jake Jabs, president and CEO of American Furniture Warehouse. Eighteen and a half million dollars of the gift went toward the construction of a new building, Jabs Hall. The remainder of the gift funded new scholarships and academic programs. The School of Business was renamed the Jake Jabs College of Business & Entrepreneurship in 2013.

== Student profile ==
=== Students ===
In 2018, the incoming freshmen class had an average high school GPA of 3.27 and an average ACT score of 23. In 2018, out of 275 graduating students, 175 were male and 100 were female. A total of 95 students graduated with the management option, 53 in accounting, 61 in marketing, and 66 with the finance option. The Master of Professional Accountancy (MPAc) program had 10 females and 11 males. In 2018, a total of 124 students graduated with a business minor: 11 in accounting, 31 in business administration, 62 in entrepreneurship & small business management, 14 in finance and 6 in international business.

During fall semester 2018, there were a total of 66 student athletes enrolled in the college. Sports represented: Alpine skiing, basketball, football, golf, rodeo, Nordic skiing, tennis, track & field, volleyball, and the spirit squad. There are ten student clubs or organizations affiliated and supported by the college: American Marketing Association at Montana State, Beta Alpha Psi/Accounting Club, Collegiate DECA, Enactus, Finance Club, International Business Club, Management and HR Club, Montana Investment Group, Women in Business, and MSU LaunchCats.

The spring 2019 cohort of business students scored in the 94th percentile on the Major Field Test – Business, administered to business seniors in more than 495 institutions across the country. Based on the Career Destinations self-survey through the Montana State University's Career, Internship & Student Employment Services, 94% of undergraduates reported full or part-time employment or continuing education in AY2018. The MPAc graduating class reported 100% had full or part-time employment or continuing education immediately following graduation.

== Notable alumni ==
- Dane Fletcher (2009) former NFL linebacker
- Travis Lulay (2006) CFL quarterback
