= Copetonas =

- Town
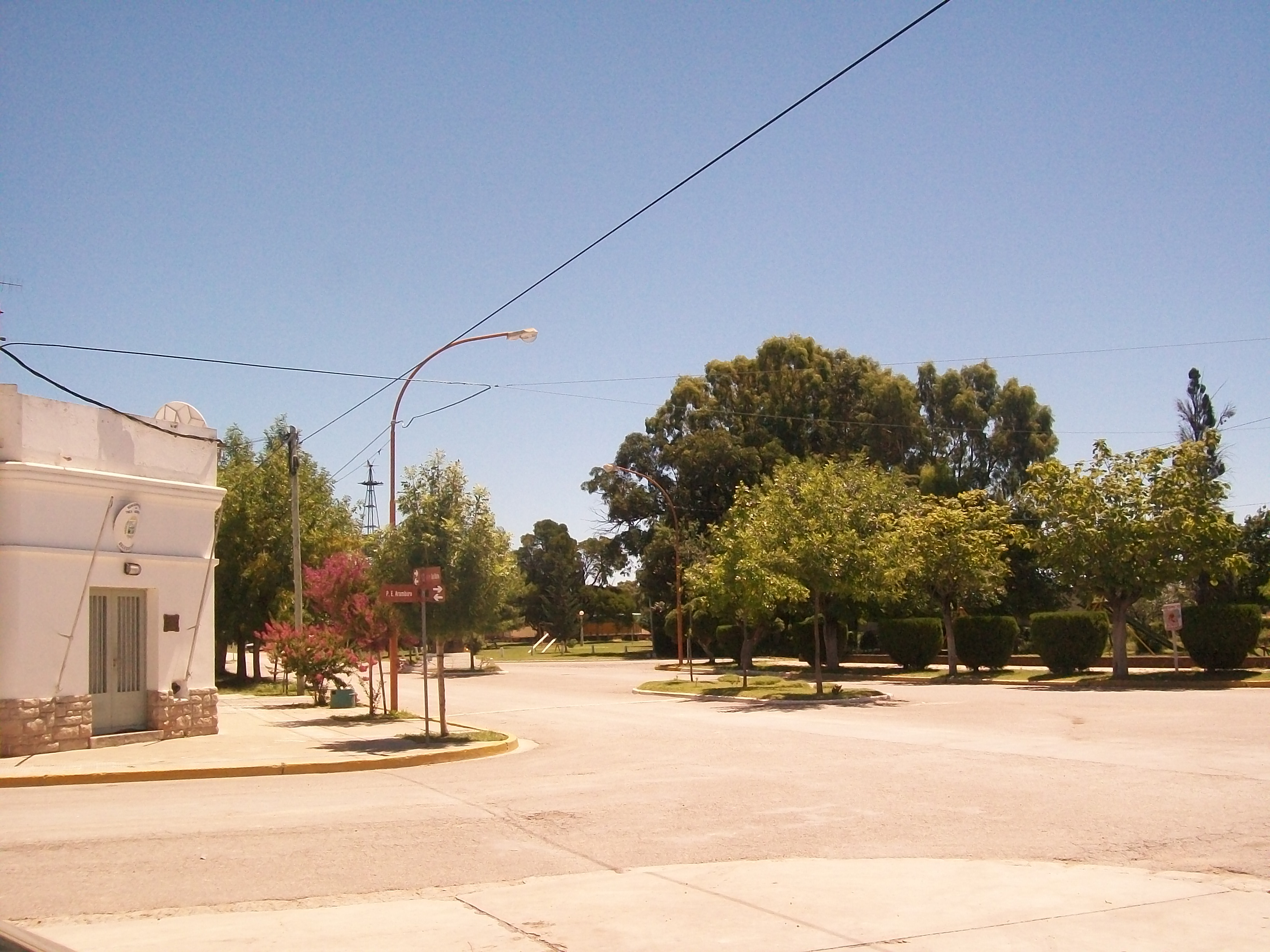

- Location within Buenos Aires Province
- Coordinates: 38°43′024″S 60°27′10″W
- Country: Argentina
- Province: Buenos Aires
- Partidos: Tres Arroyos
- Established: October 11, 1912
- Elevation: 45 m (148 ft)

Population (2001 Census)
  - Total: 1,196
- Time zone: UTC−3 (ART)
- CPA Base: B 7511
- Climate: Dfc

Copetonas is a town located in the western end of the Tres Arroyos Partido in the province of Buenos Aires, Argentina. While the town initially developed as a major cereal production center, it has since declined in importance.

== Geography ==
Copetonas is located 52 km (32 mi) from the regional seat of Tres Arroyos and 560 km (350 mi) from the city of Buenos Aires. The town is adjacent to the Quequén Salado River.

== History ==
The region that would become Copetonas was initially near the site of a fort constructed in 1870, with the area around Copetonas being the site of some of the last major raids carried out by Indians in the region. Rather unusually, the area around the town was already settled by the time of its establishment.

Copetonas was founded on October 11, 1912 upon the completion of a railway station in the region from land sold by a group of settlers. The town was established in a region referred to as the "Place of the Copetonas", a species of tinamu native to the region, making Copetonas the only town in the province to have been named for a bird. Alternatively. the town may have also been named as a Spanish pronunciation of the city of Cape Town, in South Africa. Copetonas was initially settled by Danish immigrants.

Copetonas was a major producer of cereal, by some accounts the largest in the southeast of the province. At its peak, the town was home to a newspaper, various commercial shops including a cinema, and a hydroelectric plant, most of which closed or left in later years as the town's population declined. In 2014, Copetonas was inaugurated as a "Tourist Village" by the Argentine Secretary of Tourism.

== Economy ==
The town's economy is primarily based on agriculture and livestock, although in recent years Copetonas has been promoted as a tourist center.

== Population ==
The town's population peaked during the 1940s and 50s with a population of around 5,000 residents, a number which has declined sharply since. According to INDEC, which collects population data for the country, the town had a population of 1,196 people as of the 2001 census, 1,017 inhabitants in the 2010 census, and 1,128 inhabitants in the 2022 census.
