= Coronel Suárez =

- City
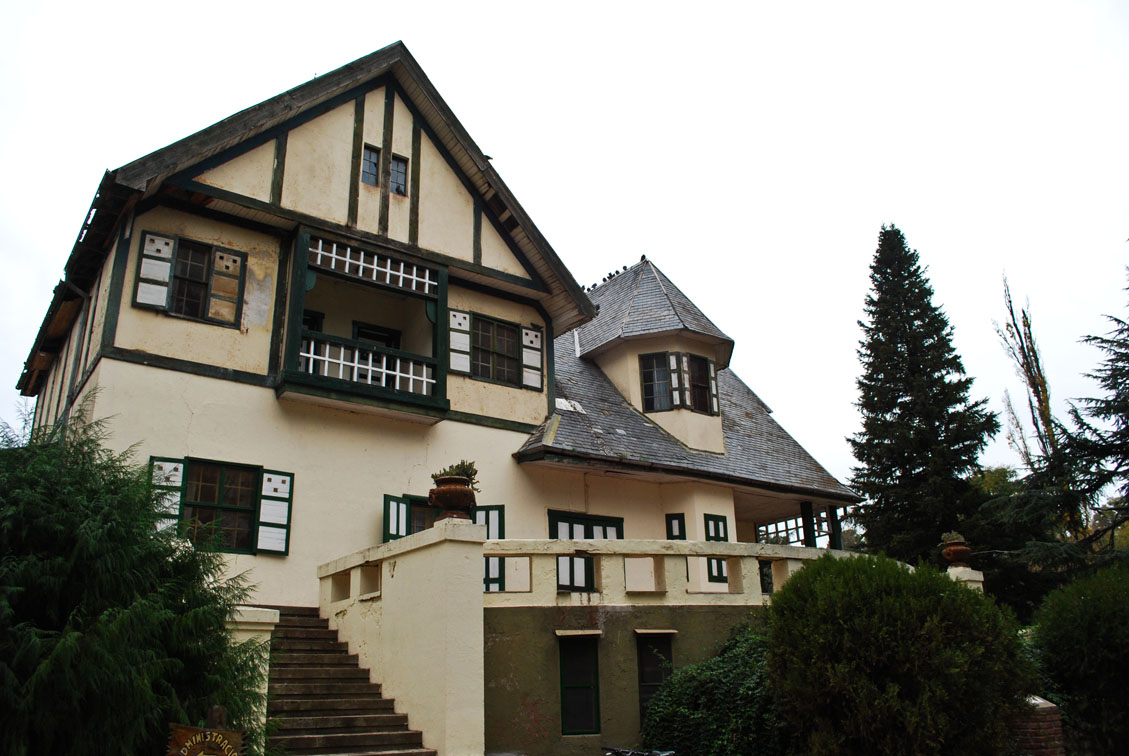
- German architecture in Coronel Suárez

- Location in Argentina
- Coordinates: 37°28′S 61°56′W
- Country: Argentina
- Province: Buenos Aires
- Partido: Coronel Suárez
- Founded: May 28, 1883
- Elevation: 228 m (748 ft)

Population (2010 census [INDEC])
  - Total: 23,621
- CPA Base: B 7540
- Area code: +54 2926

Coronel Suárez is a city in Buenos Aires Province, Argentina. It is the administrative centre for Coronel Suárez Partido.

Coronel Suárez has a population of 23,621 inhabitants (2010) and its main economic activities are related to agriculture and cattle raising. It is famous for its Polo Club, founded in 1929, whose team has achieved outstanding success over the years in the annual Argentine Open Polo Championship, the world's most important polo tournament, including winning the Championship for ten successive years between 1961 and 1970.

== History ==
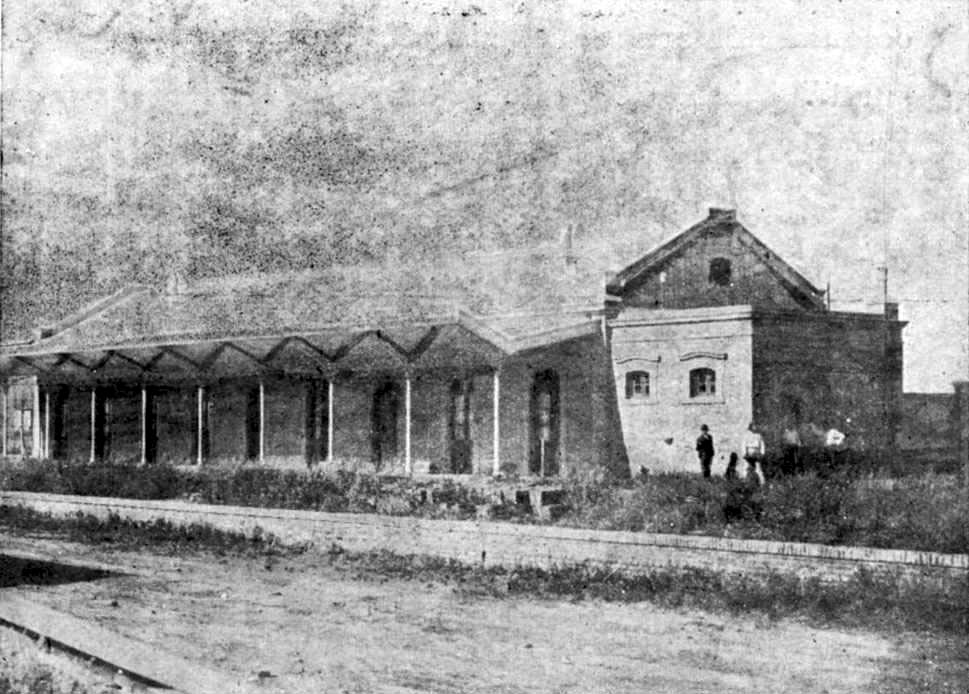
Coronel Suárez Station (FCRPB) in 1940.

The partido was created in 1882 by the government of Buenos Aires Province in Argentina who divided the territory of Tres Arroyos into the partidos of Tres Arroyos, Coronel Pringles and Coronel Suárez. The latter partido, and its main town, were named after Manuel Isidoro Suárez (1799–1846), a colonel in the Argentine Army who fought in the wars of independence against the Spanish and led the Peruvian and Colombian infantry to victory in the Battle of Junín in the Junín Region of Peru on August 6, 1824. Colonel Suárez was the great grandfather of the writer Jorge Luis Borges.

The city was founded on 28 May 1883 by Eduardo Casey on the frontier of Indian territory and a fort was built beside the river Sauce Corto. From the early days it was settled by Volga German immigrants.

On 16 May 1884 a railway station was opened on the Olavarría to Bahía Blanca line, operated by the British-owned Buenos Aires Great Southern Railway. In 1907 a second station was opened on the French-owned Ferrocarril Rosario y Puerto Belgrano line.

== Culture ==
Today, both in the city of Coronel Suárez and in the German colonies in its surroundings (today with little population since the largest cities - both Coronel Suárez and others in the area - have acted as poles of attraction) you can find the different aspects of German culture, including the people who have preserved the German dialect from generation to generation. In the Santa María neighborhood, for example, every year the strudel festival is held, where a large strudel is made to share with the audience present, this is usually filled with apple. In Colonia San José, meanwhile, the Füllsel festival, a type of bread pudding, takes place, in addition to the Schlachtfest or meat festival. Likewise, every year each of the colonies celebrates its Kerb festival, that is, the festival of its Patron Saint. The German word Kerb derives from the German Kirchweih. Kirche means church, and Weih means blessing. There are parades, dinner, shows, exhibitions of crafts, traditional products and sports competitions. The Kerb festivities have been declared of municipal and provincial interest.

== Climate ==
Climate data for Coronel Suárez (1981–2010, extremes 1961–present)
Month	Jan	Feb	Mar	Apr	May	Jun	Jul	Aug	Sep	Oct	Nov	Dec	Year
Record high °C (°F)	39.3 (102.7)	39.1 (102.4)	35.8 (96.4)	33.9 (93.0)	28.2 (82.8)	26.3 (79.3)	25.1 (77.2)	31.6 (88.9)	29.3 (84.7)	33.4 (92.1)	35.6 (96.1)	39.0 (102.2)	39.3 (102.7)
Mean daily maximum °C (°F)	28.7 (83.7)	27.4 (81.3)	24.8 (76.6)	20.4 (68.7)	16.1 (61.0)	12.7 (54.9)	12.3 (54.1)	14.9 (58.8)	17.1 (62.8)	20.3 (68.5)	23.9 (75.0)	27.4 (81.3)	20.5 (68.9)
Daily mean °C (°F)	21.0 (69.8)	19.8 (67.6)	17.5 (63.5)	13.3 (55.9)	9.5 (49.1)	6.6 (43.9)	5.9 (42.6)	7.9 (46.2)	10.3 (50.5)	13.5 (56.3)	16.6 (61.9)	20.0 (68.0)	13.5 (56.3)
Mean daily minimum °C (°F)	13.8 (56.8)	12.7 (54.9)	11.1 (52.0)	7.0 (44.6)	3.8 (38.8)	1.3 (34.3)	0.4 (32.7)	1.4 (34.5)	3.4 (38.1)	6.6 (43.9)	9.3 (48.7)	12.0 (53.6)	6.9 (44.4)
Record low °C (°F)	1.0 (33.8)	1.3 (34.3)	−1.1 (30.0)	−8.1 (17.4)	−9.5 (14.9)	−10.5 (13.1)	−13.5 (7.7)	−9.8 (14.4)	−9.6 (14.7)	−5.0 (23.0)	−3.0 (26.6)	1.5 (34.7)	−13.5 (7.7)
Average precipitation mm (inches)	112.3 (4.42)	80.4 (3.17)	95.9 (3.78)	70.9 (2.79)	47.4 (1.87)	22.1 (0.87)	28.5 (1.12)	32.4 (1.28)	58.1 (2.29)	99.7 (3.93)	74.3 (2.93)	84.1 (3.31)	806.1 (31.74)
Average precipitation days (≥ 0.1 mm)	9.2	6.6	8.9	7.2	6.1	5.0	5.3	5.0	6.8	9.7	8.8	8.9	87.5
Average snowy days	0.0	0.0	0.0	0.0	0.0	0.0	0.3	0.1	0.0	0.0	0.0	0.0	0.4
Average relative humidity (%)	64.7	69.4	74.4	76.7	79.7	81.1	79.1	72.8	71.3	71.7	66.9	62.1	72.5
Mean monthly sunshine hours	274.7	264.7	241.7	197.9	155.7	129.8	143.0	174.8	200.4	231.7	259.4	252.6	2,563.7
Source 1: Servicio Meteorológico Nacional (snow 1991–2000)
Source 2: World Meteorological Organization (sunshine hours 1981–2010)

== Airfield ==
- Brig D Hector Eduardo Ruiz (SAZC)
- Elevation: 234 m (768 ft)
- Paved runway, coordinates: 37°26′46″S 61°53′21″W
- Runways: One paved runway, 1,318 m (4,324 ft) × 27 m (89 ft)
