= Huanguelén =

- Town
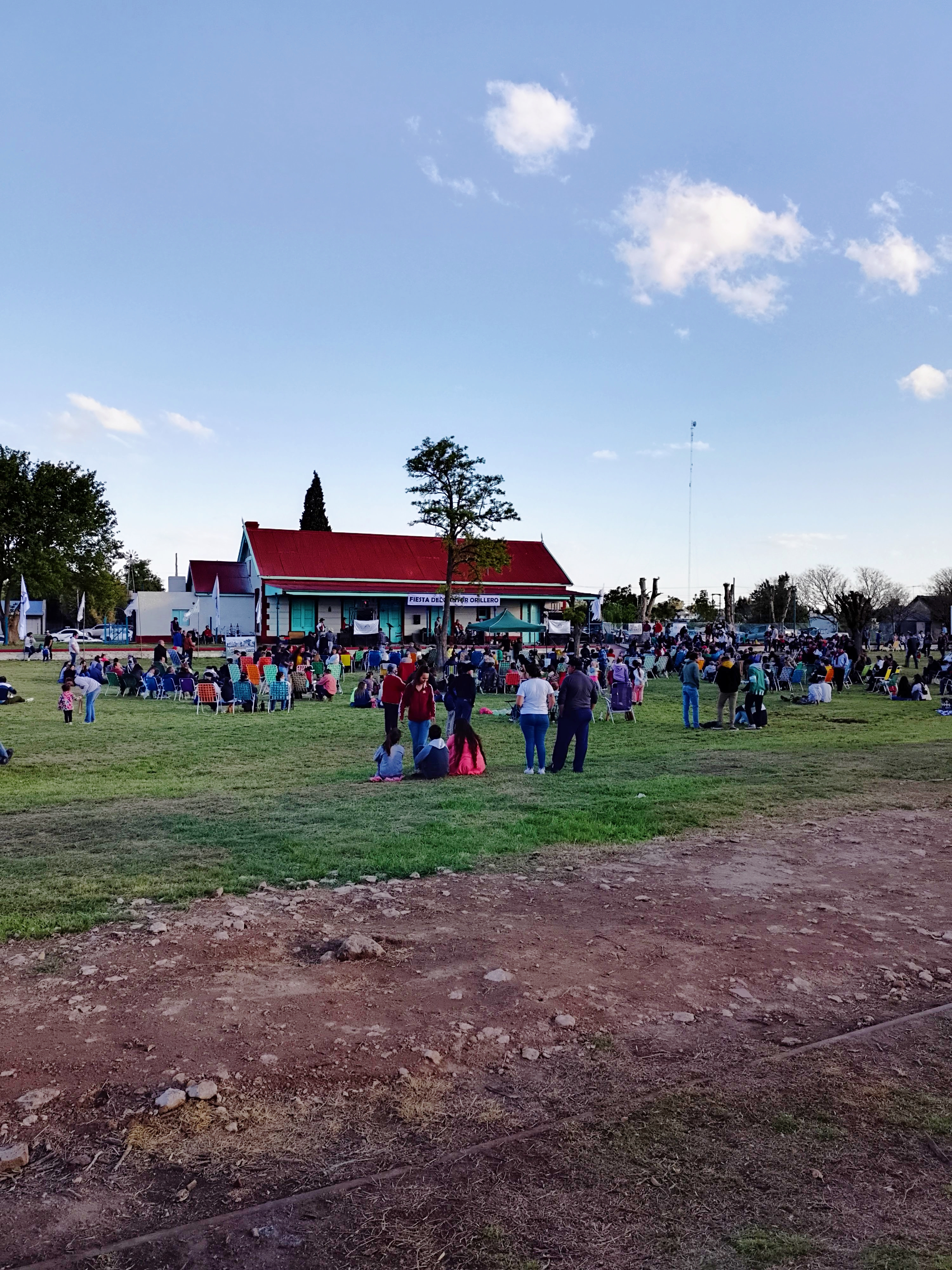
- Festival in the town

- Location within Buenos Aires Province
- Coordinates: 37°03′43″S 61°56′05″W
- Country: Argentina
- Province: Buenos Aires
- Partidos: Coronel Suárez
- Established: 1912
- Elevation: 164 m (538 ft)

Population (2001 Census)
  - Total: 4,896
- Time zone: UTC−3 (ART)
- CPA Base: B 7545
- Climate: Dfc

Huanguelén is a town located in the Coronel Suárez Partido in the province of Buenos Aires, Argentina. Part of the town extends into the Guaminí Partido.

== History ==
In September 1912, the lands now making up the town were auctioned for the creation of a community in the region.

In recent years, due to disagreements over the management of the community, calls have been made to split the town from the General Suárez Partido and instead make Huanguelén an autonomous municipality. Such a proposal would also involve annexing land from nearby partidos. The plan has been supported by multiple town officials, who have stated that separating the town would dramatically reduce the travel time to perform government actions, as Coronel Suárez, the capital of the partido, is nearly 85 km (53 mi) away from the town. The first known proposal to split the town came in 1952. In 2004, a vote was held on the status of the town, resulting in around 2,300 residents voting to secede. A public march was held in 2018 to support the town's secession.

== Population ==
According to INDEC, which collects population data for the country, the town had a population of 4,896 people as of the 2001 census.
