= Stalins Brigade =

- Cover of Stalins Brigade, March 26, 1937 edition
- Publisher: Kukkus local committee of AUCP(b)/Kukkus Executive Committee
- Founded: 1936
- Ceased publication: 1941
- Political alignment: Communist
- Language: German language
- Headquarters: Kukkus

Stalins Brigade ('Stalin's Brigade') was a Volga German communist newspaper, published from Kukkus between 1936 and 1941. Stalins Brigade was the joint organ of the Kukkus local committee of the All-Union Communist Party (bolshevik) and the Kukkus Executive Committee.
