= Manuel Isidoro Suárez =

Argentine colonel (1799–1846)

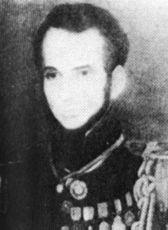
Colonel Manuel Isidoro Suárez

Manuel Isidoro Suárez (1799–1846) was an Argentine colonel who commanded Peruvian and Colombian cavalry troops in their wars of independence. He was noted for his pivotal role in securing a revolutionary victory at the Battle of Junín. He was the great-grandfather of Argentine writer Jorge Luis Borges (1899–1986), who commemorated him in three poems:

- "Sepulchral Inscription" from Fervor of Buenos Aires (1923)
- "A Page to Commemorate Colonel Suárez, Victor at Junín" from The Other, The Same (1964)
- "Colonel Suárez" from The Iron Coin (1976)

== Role in the Battle of Junín ==
On August 6, 1824, the revolutionary and royalist armies confronted one another on the plain of Junín. The revolutionaries occupied the low ground, while the royalist cavalry held better territory. The armies clashed at around four in the afternoon. In the initial melee of "swords and sabers", revolutionary general William Miller's hussars were forced back. This initial setback led Simón Bolívar to withdraw from the field to his infantry rearguard. Reunited, they hurried back and waited once more for the royalist cavalry under Canterac.

Colonel Suárez commanded the Peruvian Hussars, part of Miller's cavalry. Suárez and his men concealed themselves in a twist in the road, where they lay in wait for the enemy. They did not leave with the rest of Miller's cavalry, observing that Canterac's entire cavalry was riding in pursuit. Suárez allowed them to pass and then ordered the attack. The royalists found their unguarded flank under attack. The royalists attempted to regroup and return the attack, but began to break rank and were pursued and defeated by the Peruvian Hussars, and the Colombian Grenadiers, the Mounted Grenadiers, and Colombian Hussars.

The partido of Coronel Suárez, in the south of Buenos Aires Province, and its main city, Coronel Suárez, were both named after him.
