= Volga Germans =

18th-century German immigrants to the Volga region of Russia

Wolgadeutsche
- Flag of Volga Germans

Total population
- 594,138
- Russia: Altai Krai 79,502; Omsk Oblast 76,334; Novosibirsk Oblast 47,275; Kemerovo Oblast 35,965; Chelyabinsk Oblast 28,457; Tyumen Oblast 27,196; Sverdlovsk Oblast 22,540; Krasnodar Krai 18,469; Orenburg Oblast 18,055; Volgograd Oblast 17,051; Tomsk Oblast 13,444; Saratov Oblast 12,093; Perm Krai 10,152; Kaliningrad Oblast: 394,138
- Kazakhstan: 226,092

Languages
- In Europe: German · Russian · Kazakh; In America: Spanish · English · Portuguese

Religion
- Lutheran · Roman Catholicism · Mennonite · Baptist · Free Church · Eastern Orthodoxy

Related ethnic groups
- Black Sea Germans · Don Cossacks · Volhynian Germans · · Baltic Germans

The Volga Germans (Note: (German: Wolgadeutsche, pronounced [ˈvɔlɡaˌdɔʏtʃə]; Russian: поволжские немцы, romanized: povolzhskiye nemtsy)) are ethnic Germans who settled and historically lived along the Volga River in the region of southeastern European Russia around Saratov and close to Ukraine nearer to the south.

Recruited as immigrants to Russia in the 18th century, they were allowed to maintain their German culture, language, traditions and churches (Lutheran, Reformed, Catholics, Moravians and Mennonites). In the 19th and early 20th centuries, many Volga Germans emigrated to the United States, Canada, Brazil and Argentina.

After the October Revolution, the Volga German ASSR was established as an autonomous republic of the Russian SFSR. During World War II, the republic was abolished by the Soviet government and the Volga Germans were forcibly expelled to a number of areas in the hinterlands of the Soviet Union. There is scholarly debate about whether or not the events constitute a genocide.

Following the dissolution of the Soviet Union in 1991, many Volga Germans immigrated to Germany.

== History ==
=== Invitation to settle in Russia ===
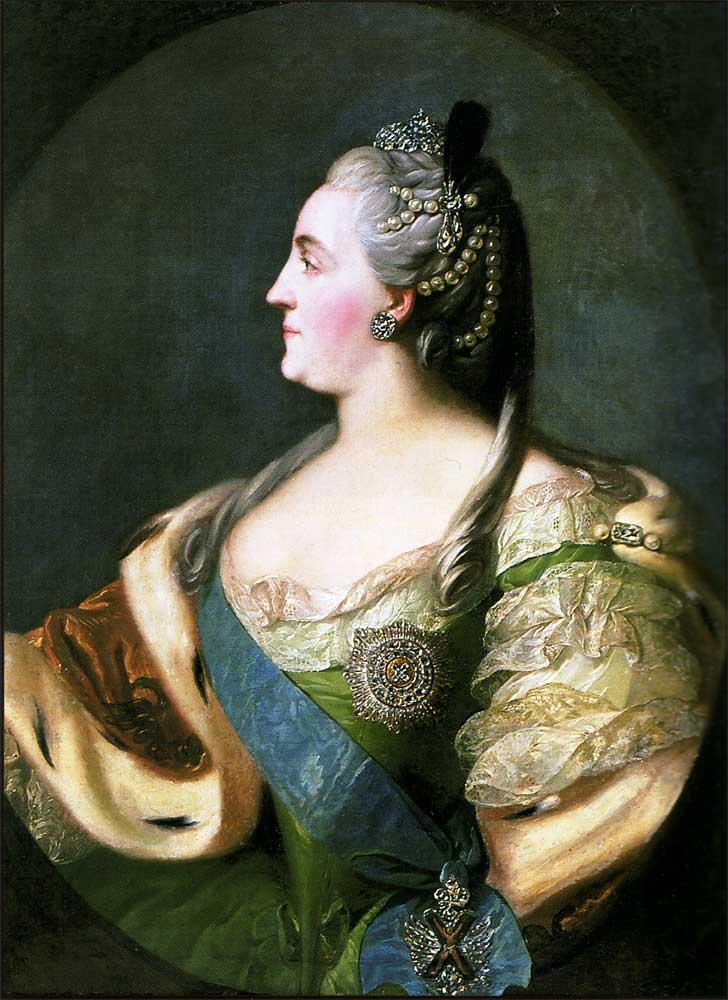
Catherine the Great.

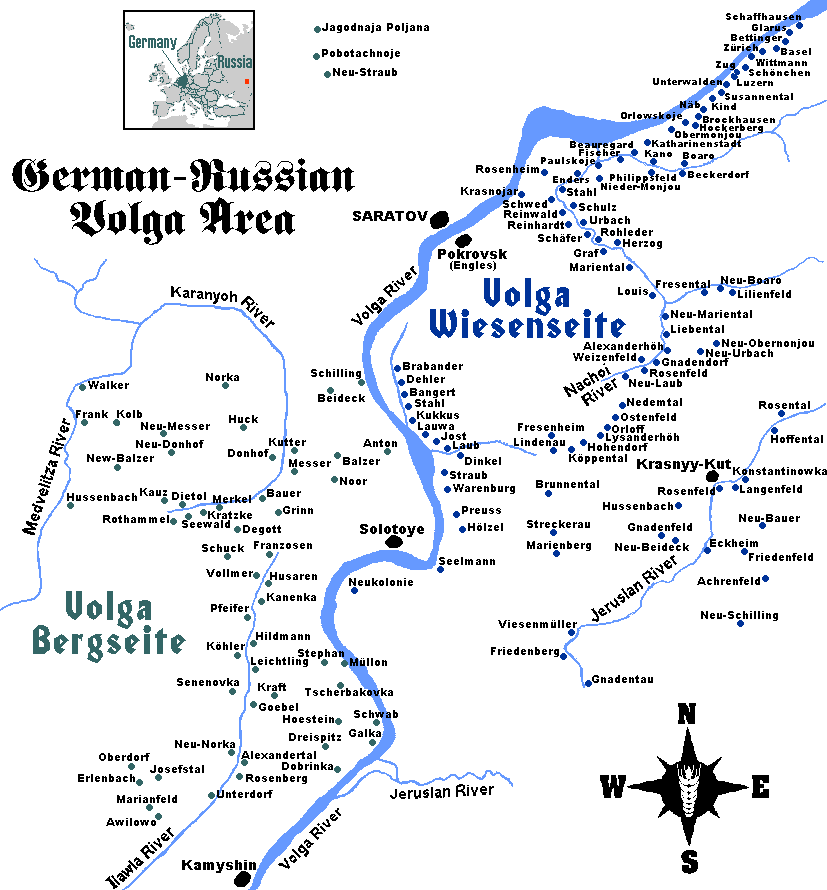
Volga German cities and settlements.

In 1762, Catherine II, born a German princess and a native of Stettin, Pomerania, deposed her husband Peter III, born a German prince in Kiel, and took the Russian imperial throne. Following the lead of Maria Theresa, Empress of Austria and Hungary, inviting Germans to settle on the Danube in the Balkans, Catherine the Great published manifestos in 1762 and 1763 inviting non-Muslim, non-Jewish Europeans to immigrate, become Russian subjects, and farm Russian lands while maintaining their language and culture. Although the first received little response, the second improved the benefits offered and was more successful in attracting colonists. People in other countries such as France and Ireland were more inclined to migrate to the colonies in the Americas. Other countries, such as Austria, forbade emigration.

In the late 18th century, nomadic Kazakhs took advantage of the disorder caused by Pugachev's Rebellion to raid Volga German settlements.

Those who went to Russia had special rights under the terms of the manifesto. Some, such as being exempt from military service, were revoked in the latter part of the 19th century when the government needed more conscripts for the Russian army. The Plautdietsch-speaking Mennonite communities were opposed to military service because of their pacifist beliefs, so many Mennonites immigrated to the Americas instead.

=== 19th century ===
At the end of the 19th century, the Russian empire began to apply an aggressive policy of Russification. Although they had been promised a degree of relative autonomy (including being exempt from conscription) when they settled in the Russian empire, the Russian monarchy gradually eroded their specific rights as time went on. The Germans began to suffer a considerable loss of autonomy. Conscription was eventually reinstated. That was not wanted and was especially harmful to the Mennonites, who practice pacifism. Throughout the 19th century, pressure increased from the Russian government to culturally assimilate. Many Germans from Russia found it necessary to emigrate to avoid conscription and preserve their culture. This caused some Germans to organize themselves and send emissaries to some countries in the Americas in order to assess potential settlement destinations. The chosen destinations were Canada, United States, Brazil and Argentina. Most Volga Germans who settled in Latin America were Catholic. Many Catholic Volga Germans chose South America as their new homeland because the nations shared their religion.

==== North America ====
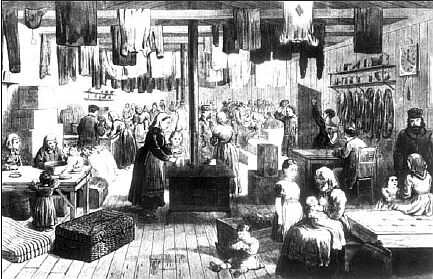
Temporary quarters for Volga Germans in central Kansas, 1875.

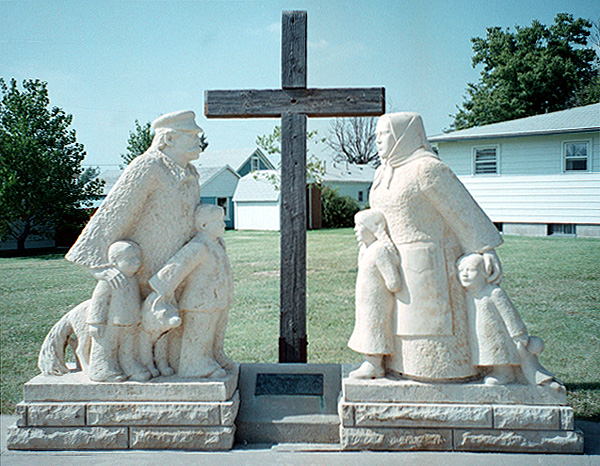
Volga German pioneer family commemorative statue in Victoria, Kansas, US by Pete Felten, 1976

Germans from Russia were the most traditional of German-speaking arrivals to North America. In the United States, many settled primarily in the Dakotas, Kansas, and Nebraska by 1900. The south-central part of North Dakota was known as "the German-Russian triangle" (that includes descendants of Black Sea Germans). A smaller number moved farther west, finding employment as ranchers and cowboys. They also settled in Ohio, Iowa, Michigan, Minnesota, Oregon (especially in Portland), Washington, Wisconsin, and Fresno County in California's Central Valley. They often succeeded in dryland farming, which they had practiced in Russia. Many of the immigrants who arrived between 1870 and 1912 spent a period doing farm labor, especially in northeastern Colorado and in Montana along the lower Yellowstone River in sugar beet fields. Colonies kept in touch with each other through newspapers, especially Der Staats Anzeiger, based in North Dakota. By author Richard Sallet's count, there were 118,493 descendants of Volga Germans of the first and second generation living in the United States according to the 1920 United States census. In Colorado, white farm owners viewed the Volga German immigrants as racially inferior due to their social status as farm laborers.

In Canada, the largest groups settled mainly in the area of the Great Plains: Alberta, Manitoba, and Saskatchewan. In Saskatchewan, many settled in the predominantly German settlement of St. Joseph's Colony, including the town of Luseland.

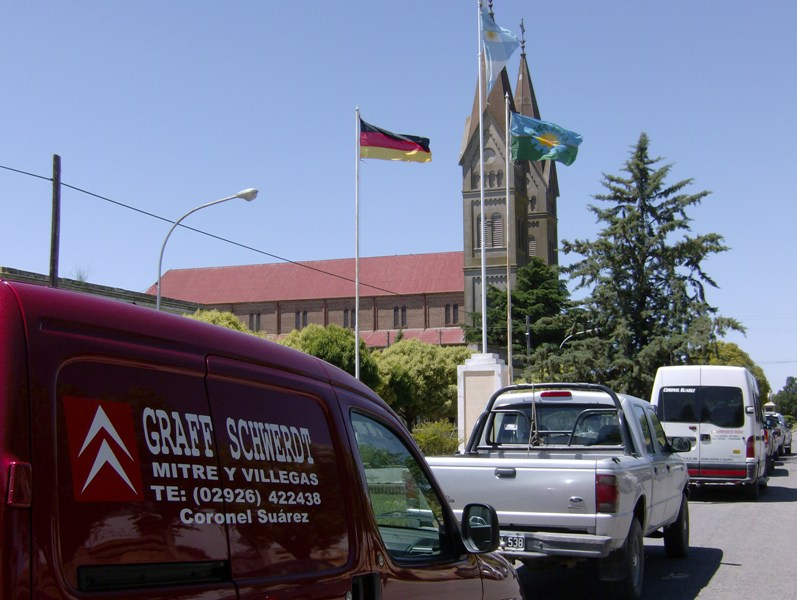
Flags of Argentina, Buenos Aires Province and Germany in front of St. Joseph Catholic Church in San José, Coronel Suárez Partido, Argentina (Volga German colony).

==== South America ====
Germans from Russia also settled in Argentina (see German Argentines) and Brazil (see German Brazilians). Additionally, many of the Volga Germans who had previously settled in Brazil later also went to settle in Argentina due to the difficulties of planting wheat in Brazil, among other reasons.

In Argentina, Volga Germans have founded many colonies or villages. For example, around the city of Coronel Suárez in the South of Buenos Aires Province, around the city of Crespo in Entre Ríos Province, along the East of La Pampa Province, etc. Every year, the community of Volga German descendants holds different celebrations in the country in which they keep their traditions alive. For example, the Kerb (festival to honour the patron saint of a colony), the Kreppelfest, the Strudelfest, the Füllselfest, the Schlachtfest (also promoted by its Spanish name Fiesta de la Carneada), the Fiesta del Pirok (Bierock festival), etc.

Today, 8% of the Argentine population or 3.5 million Argentines claim German ancestry. Of those, more than 2.5 million claim Volga German descent, making them the majority of those having German ancestry in the country, and accounting for 5.7% of the total Argentine population. Descendants of Volga Germans outnumber descendants of Germans from Germany itself, who number one million in Argentina (2.3% of the population).

=== 20th century ===
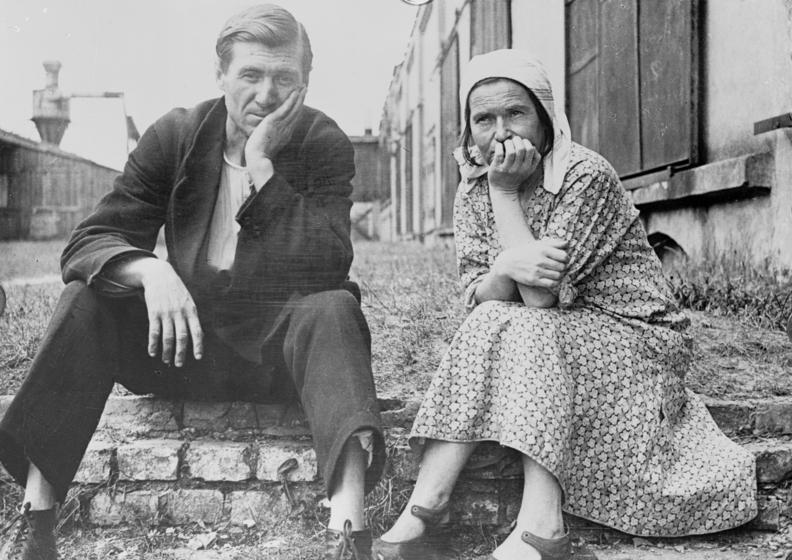
Ethnic Germans from the Volga region at a refugee camp in Schneidemühl, Germany, early 1920s.

Following the Russian Revolution, the Volga German Autonomous Soviet Socialist Republic (German: Autonome Sozialistische Sowjet-Republik der Wolga-Deutschen; Russian: АССР Немцев Поволжья) was established in 1924, and it lasted until 1941. Its capital was Engels, known as Pokrovsk (Kosakenstadt in German) before 1931.

==== Soviet deportation ====
The deportation of the Volga Germans was the Soviet government's forcible transfer of the whole of the Volga German population from the Volga German Autonomous Soviet Socialist Republic, Saratov Oblast and Stalingrad Oblast to Siberia and Kazakhstan, with about half being resettled in each region. The Soviets, bearing in mind the collaboration of the Sudeten Germans of Czechoslovakia with Nazi Germany, decided as a precautionary measure to transfer the Volga German population.

These deportations, which also included the deportation of the rest of the ethnic Germans from Russia, had been implemented for several years before World War II and they became particularly exhaustive on 3 September 1941, during the war.

Of all of the ethnic German communities which lived in the Soviet Union, the Volga Germans represented the largest group of ethnic Germans which was expelled from its historical homeland. All of their possessions were confiscated and they were mainly deported because of their ethnicity. Shortly after the German invasion, on 22 June 1941, Stalin sent Beria and Molotov to the Volga German Autonomous Soviet Socialist Republic to determine a course of action for its German inhabitants. On return, they recommended the deportation of the entire German population. Consequently, the Central Committee of the Communist Party issued a resolution on 12 August, calling for the expulsion of the entire ethnic German population. With this authority, Beria on 27 August issued an order entitled "On Measures for Conducting the Operation of Resettling the Germans from the Volga German Republic, Saratov, and Stalingrad Oblasts", assigning the deputy head of the NKVD, Ivan Serov, to command this operation. He also allocated NKVD and Red Army troops to carry out the transfer.

On 26 August 1941, the Council of People's Commissars of the USSR and the Central Committee of the CPSU published decrees concerning the impending deportations. Following that, on 28 August, the Presidium of the Supreme Soviet of the USSR approved and published a decree, according to which the Germans were to be sent to various oblasts (provinces) in Siberia, Kazakhstan and others, beginning on 3 September, and ending on 20 September. On 7 September, the Volga German Autonomous Soviet Socialist Republic was officially abolished, clearly showing that the Soviets considered the expulsion of the Germans final. 28 August later became the unofficial Day of Mourning and Memory of Russian Germans.

The Soviet regime stated that the evacuation was a preventive measure, so that the German population would not be misled into collaborating with the German Army rather than a punitive measure, and they did not reveal the sentence to the forced labor camps. Stalin allegedly gave the following "secret" order to the NKVD, produced in German-controlled Latvia on 20 September 1941:

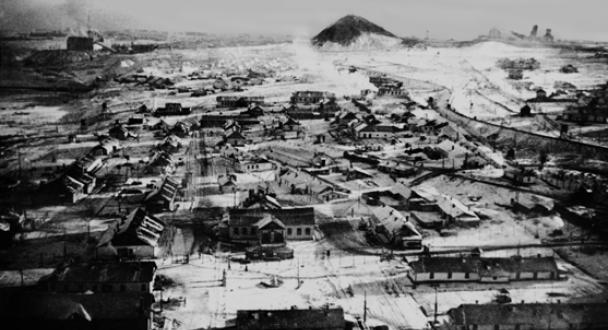
Aerial view of the Vorkutlag, one of the GULAG forced labor camps where many Germans from Russia perished.

"After the house search, tell everyone who is scheduled to be deported that, according to the government's decision, they are being sent to other regions of the USSR. Transport the entire family in one car until the train station, but at the station, heads of families must be loaded into a separate train car prepared especially for them. Their families are deported for special settlements in the far away regions of the Union. [Family members] must not know about the forthcoming separation from the head of the family."

The document above may be a fabrication, as Latvia was under German occupation at that time. Nevertheless, the instructions were followed by the NKVD troops who directed the deportation. The reason for separating the men could have been that they were all destined to be sent to forced labor camps, known as Trudarmee (labor army, officially referred to as labor columns). The deported Germans coined this phrase, whereas Soviet documents only referred to "labor obligations" or "labor regulations." Able-bodied men between the ages of 15 and 55 and, later, able-bodied women between the ages of 16 and 45 were forced to do labor in the forests and mines of Siberia and Central Asia under conditions similar to those prevalent in the Gulag forced labor camps, while other Germans were directly deported to Gulag forced labor camps. After the Nazi invasion began, the NKVD (via Prikaz No. 35105) banned ethnic Germans from serving in the Soviet military. They sent tens of thousands of these soldiers to the Trudarmee.

The expulsion of the Volga Germans was finished on schedule at the end of September 1941. According to the Soviet Union, the total number sent to forced internal exile was about 950,000. However, the actual estimated number of victims is much higher. It took 151 train convoys to accomplish the first transfers of the Volga German population. This operation also involved 1,550 NKVD and 3,250 police agents, assisted by 12,150 soldiers of the Red Army.

=== Genocide debate ===
In 1942, nearly all the able-bodied German population was conscripted to the NKVD labor columns or had been sent to the Gulag forced labor camps. According to Stanford historian Robert Conquest, during the first stage, about one-third did not survive the camps. 200,000 Balts, 200,000 Bessarabians and c. 1.5 million Volga Germans, Crimean Tartars, etc. were deported from ethnic enclaves in the Soviet Union after 1940, deaths involved are not known precisely, but are estimated to number around 500,000. The conditions imposed on ethnic Germans by the regime continued to be inhumane. The deportation and subsequent deaths to ethnic minorities during Stalin's rule is referred to as an ethnic cleansing. Some historians refer to these acts as a genocide, though there is debate whether or not the destruction of non-Russians was intentional. Historian J. Otto Pohl argues that the deportation provisions are used by other scholars to deny classification of the events as a genocide, despite the same provisions in other accepted genocides, such as that of the Armenians. Other historians have categorized it as a sub-category of genocide, ethnocide. Ethnically German minorities received little empathy for mass expulsions due to their German ethnicity and assumed relation to the Nazi regime.

=== Recent years ===
The Volga Germans never returned to the Volga region in their old numbers. They were not allowed to settle in the area for decades. After World War II, many survivors remained in the Ural Mountains, Siberia, Kazakhstan (1.4% of today's Kazakh population are recognized as Germans—around 200,000), Kyrgyzstan, and Uzbekistan (about 16,000 or 0.064%). Decades after the war, some talked about resettling where the German Autonomous Republic used to be. But all their properties had been occupied by Russian communists. They met opposition from the new population there and did not persevere. A proposal in June 1979 called for a new German Autonomous Republic within Kazakhstan, with a capital in Ermentau. The proposal was aimed at addressing the living conditions of the displaced Volga Germans. At the time, around 936,000 ethnic Germans were living in Kazakhstan, as the republic's third-largest ethnic group. On 16 June 1979, demonstrators in Tselinograd (Astana) protested this proposal. Fearing a negative reaction among the majority Kazakhs and calls for autonomy among local Uyghurs, the ruling Communist Party scrapped the proposal for ethnic German autonomy within Kazakhstan.

Since the late 1980s and the fall of the Soviet Union, some ethnic Germans have returned in small numbers to Engels, but many more immigrated permanently to Germany. They took advantage of the German law of return, a policy that grants citizenship to all those who can prove to be a refugee or expellee of German ethnic origin or as the spouse or descendant of such a person.

== Notable people of Volga German descent ==
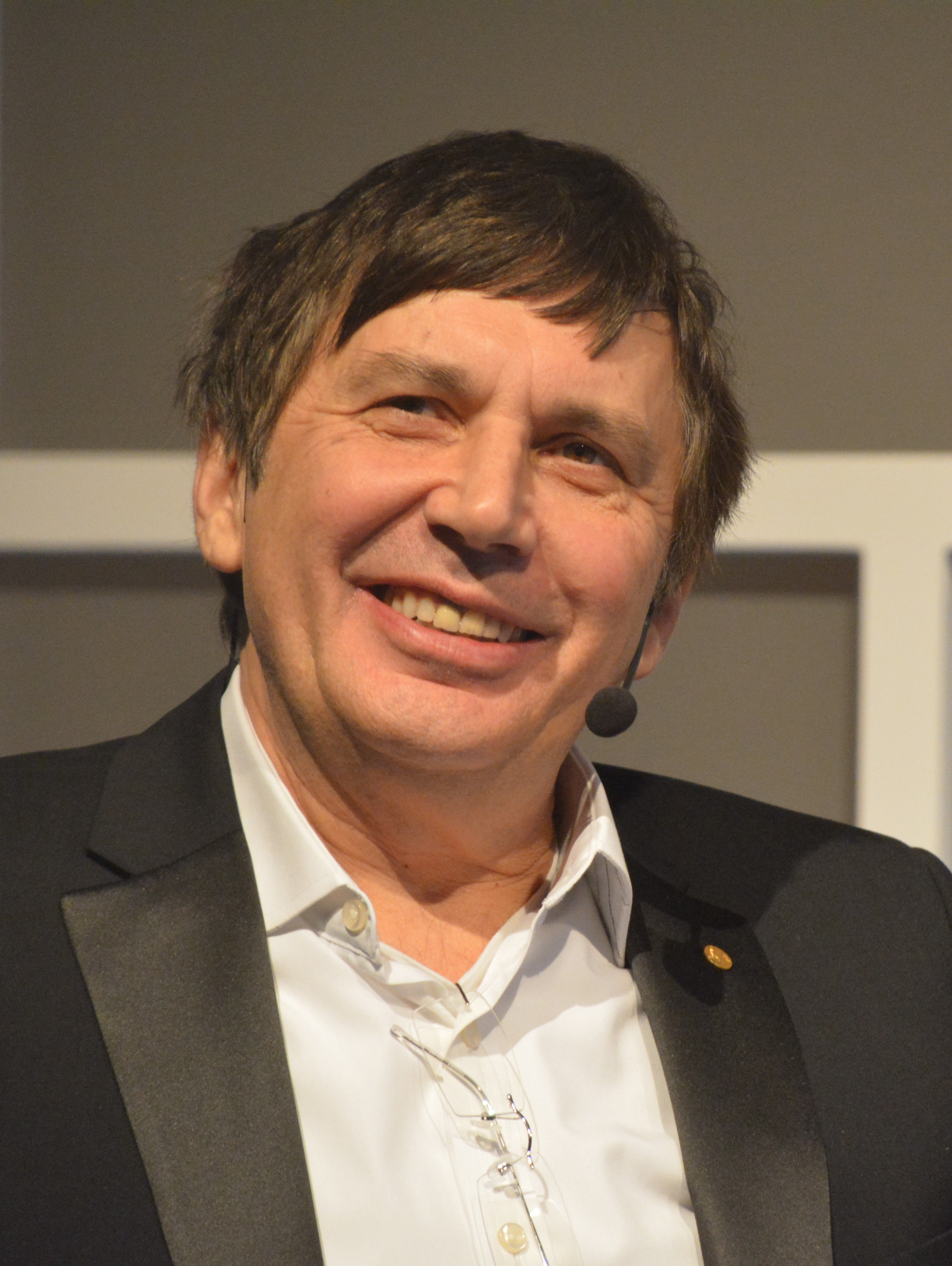
Andre Geim, 2010 Nobel laureate in Physics.

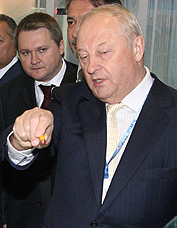
Eduard Rossel was the governor (1995–2009) of Sverdlovsk Oblast, Russia.

- Pamela Anderson (born 1967), Canadian-American actress and model
- Philip Anschutz (born 1939), American billionaire businessman
- Harold W. Bauer (1908–1942), American USMC fighter pilot
- Edgar Bernhardt (born 1986), Kyrgyz footballer
- Khristiyan Brauzman (born 2003), Kyrgyz footballer
- Tom Daschle (born 1947), American politician
- Sergio Denis (1949–2020), Argentine singer-songwriter
- Jean Bethke Elshtain (1941–2013), American political philosopher and academic
- Joe Exotic (born 1963), American former Zoo owner
- Helene Fischer (born 1984), German singer, dancer and entertainer
- Tim Gaines (born 1962), American musician
- Sir Andre Geim (born 1958), Russian-born Dutch-British physicist and 2010 Nobel laureate
- Jim Geringer (born 1944), American politician, 30th Governor of Wyoming
- Sonja Graf (1908–1965), German-American chess player and two-time U.S. women's champion
- Gabriel Heinze (born 1978), Argentine football player
- Óscar Ibáñez (born 1967), Argentine-born Peruvian football player
- Jake Jabs (born 1930), American founder and CEO of American Furniture Warehouse
- Viktor Kress (born 1948), Russian politician, governor of Tomsk Oblast, Russia
- Randy Meisner (born 1946), American musician, original bassist with the Eagles
- Roman Neustädter (born 1988), Russian-German football player
- Peter Neustädter (born 1966), Kyrgyz-born German football player and coach
- Boris Rauschenbach, (1915–2001), scientist, physicist in Russia
- Eduard Rossel (born 1937), Russian politician
- Cher Scarlett (born 1984 or 1985), American software engineer and labor activist
- Alfred Schnittke (1934–1998), Russian composer
- Kendall Schmidt (born 1990), American singer of Big Time Rush
- Heinrich Schmidtgal (born 1985), Kazakh footballer
- Diana Shnaider (born 2004), Russian tennis player
- Alvina Shpady (1935–2019), Uzbek artist and art restorer
- Rebecca Staab (born 1961), Miss Nebraska 1980 and American Actress
- Afu Thomas (born 1988), German Internet celebrity active in China
- Mitch Unrein (born 1987), American football player
- Sergio Unrein (born 1991), Argentine football player
- Lawrence Welk (born 1903) American band leader and TV host.
- Joseph Werth (born 1952), Bishop of Transfiguration at Novosibirsk
- Brendan Witt (born 1975), NHL Hockey Player

== Language ==
The greatest number of Volga Germans emigrated from Hesse and the Palatinate, and spoke Hessian and Palatine Rhine Franconian dialects to which the colonists from other regions, and even from other countries like Sweden, assimilated. Some Volga German dialects are very similar to Pennsylvania Dutch, another Palatine Rhine Franconian language; in either dialect, one could say:

- (spelled according to standard German pronunciation rules:) Mehr wolla mohl gaern in die sche gehl Kaerrich geha.
- (in German:) Wir wollen einmal gern in die schöne gelbe Kirche gehen.
- (in English:) We would like to go into the beautiful yellow church.

Some other common words:

Volga German	Standard German	English
Baam (some dialects), Boum (other dialects)	Baum	tree
Daitsch (Deitsch)	Deutsch	German
Flaasch (some dialects), Fleesch (other dialects)	Fleisch	flesh, meat
g'sotza	gesessen	(that has been) sat down
ich sin, ich bin	ich bin	I am
Kopp	Kopf	head
net	nicht	not
seim	seinem	his (dative)
un	und	and
Gu Morzha	Guten Morgen	Good Morning
Vo geest Du	Wohin gehst Du	Where are you going
Eisch gee hamn	Ich gehe heim	I'm going home
Eisch gee nit	Ich gehe nicht	I'm not going
Fro-uh Nigh Yor	Frohes Neues Jahr	Happy New Year!
Geest Du hamn Du bayza Boop	Gehst Du heim Du böser Bub	Go home you bad boy
Grautgoge, Gahdovil und Vorscht	Krautkuche, Kartoffeln und Wurst	Krautkuche, potatoes, and sausage

The above list only attempts to reproduce the pronunciation and does not represent how the Volga Germans wrote. The dialects of the Germans of Russia mainly presented differences in pronunciation, as occurs in the diversity of the English language. However, Volga Germans wrote and kept their records in Standard German.

Volga Germans only borrowed a few but anecdotal Russian words, like Erbus (from Russian арбуз "watermelon"), which they carried with them on their subsequent moves to North America and Argentina.

The Standard German-related variety influenced by dialects and spoken by Volgan Germans who moved to Argentina is called Paraná-Wolga-Deutsch. It is also spoken in the Brazilian state of Paraná in addition to the Argentine province of Entre Ríos.

== See also ==
- German diaspora
- Kazakhstan Germans
- History of Germans in Russia, Ukraine, and the Soviet Union
- Volga German Autonomous Soviet Socialist Republic
- Volhynia
- Russian Mennonites
- Baltic Germans
