= Juan Pascual Pringles =

Military leader in the Spanish American Wars of Independence

Col. Juan Pascual Pringles
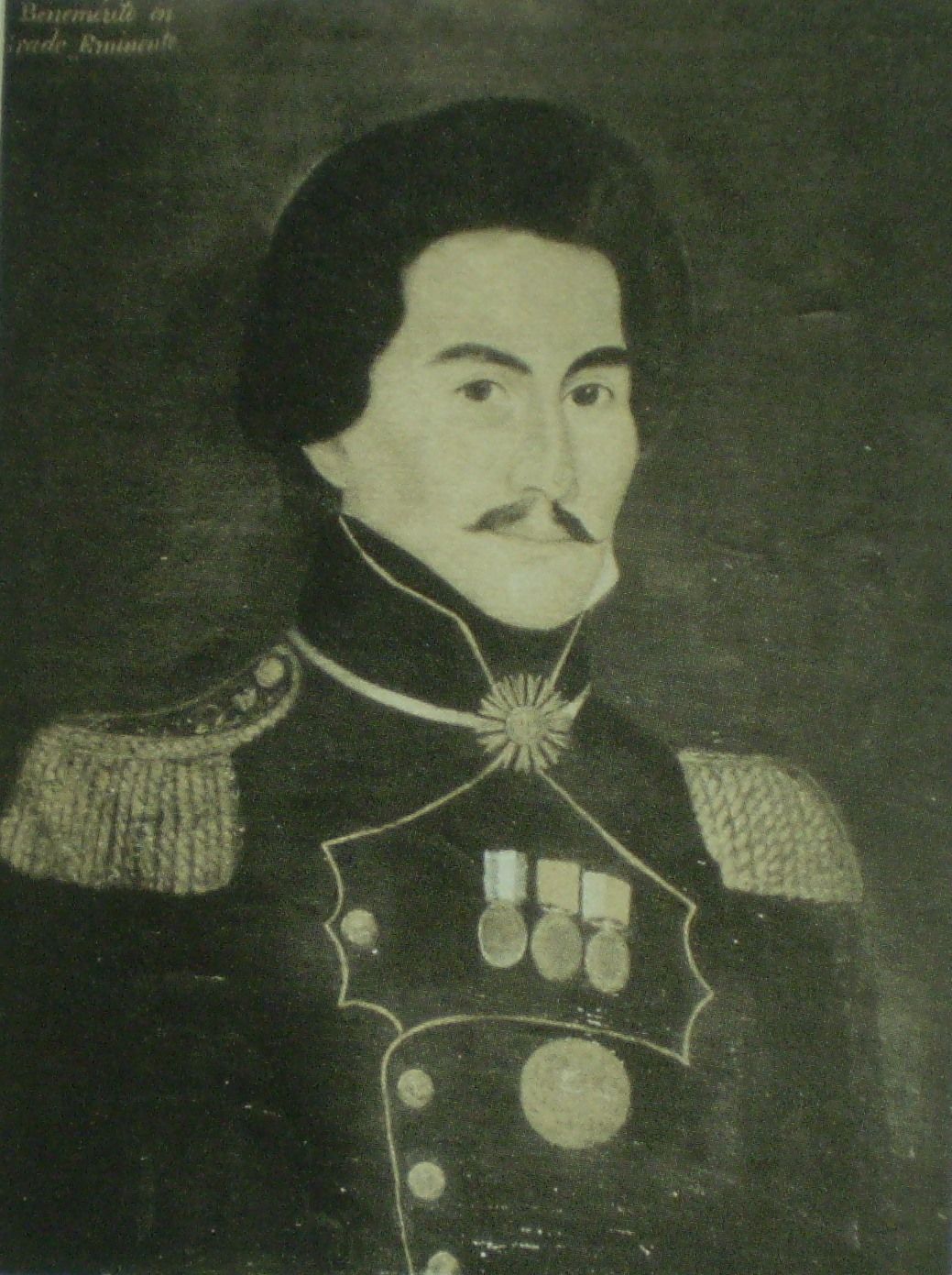
- Born: 1795-05-17; San Luis, Argentina
- Died: 1831-03-10
- Known for: Spanish American wars of independence

Juan Pascual Pringles (May 17, 1795 – March 10, 1831) was a distinguished military leader in the Spanish American wars of independence, with the rank of colonel, and later a leader of the Argentine Unitarian Party.

Pringles was born in San Luis, Argentina on May 17, 1795. From 1811 until 1814 he worked in Mendoza before joining a militia in 1815. In 1820 he joined the Regiment of Mounted Grenadiers and departed for Peru as part of an expeditionary force of liberators and on arrival fought in many major battles, including the Battle of Junín and the Battle of Ayacucho. In 1829 he returned to Buenos Aires, and was soon drawn into the civil wars between the Unitarian Party and the Federalists.

He died in battle at Chañaral de las Ánimas against Facundo Quiroga's forces on March 10, 1831. Rather than surrender his sword to Quiroga's subordinate and not to the general in person, he broke it in half before being shot and killed. Quiroga later reprimanded the soldier who took Pringles' life without consulting him.

== Pringles in modern Argentina ==
Today, the main square of the provincial capital of San Luis bears the name Plaza Pringles in his honor, and also features an equestrian statue of him. A small square in the centre of Rosario is also called Plaza Pringles.

The partido and city of Coronel Pringles in Buenos Aires Province are named after Pringles, as are several streets in Buenos Aires, San Luis, Quilmes, and other cities.
