= Reta, Buenos Aires =

Reta
- Town
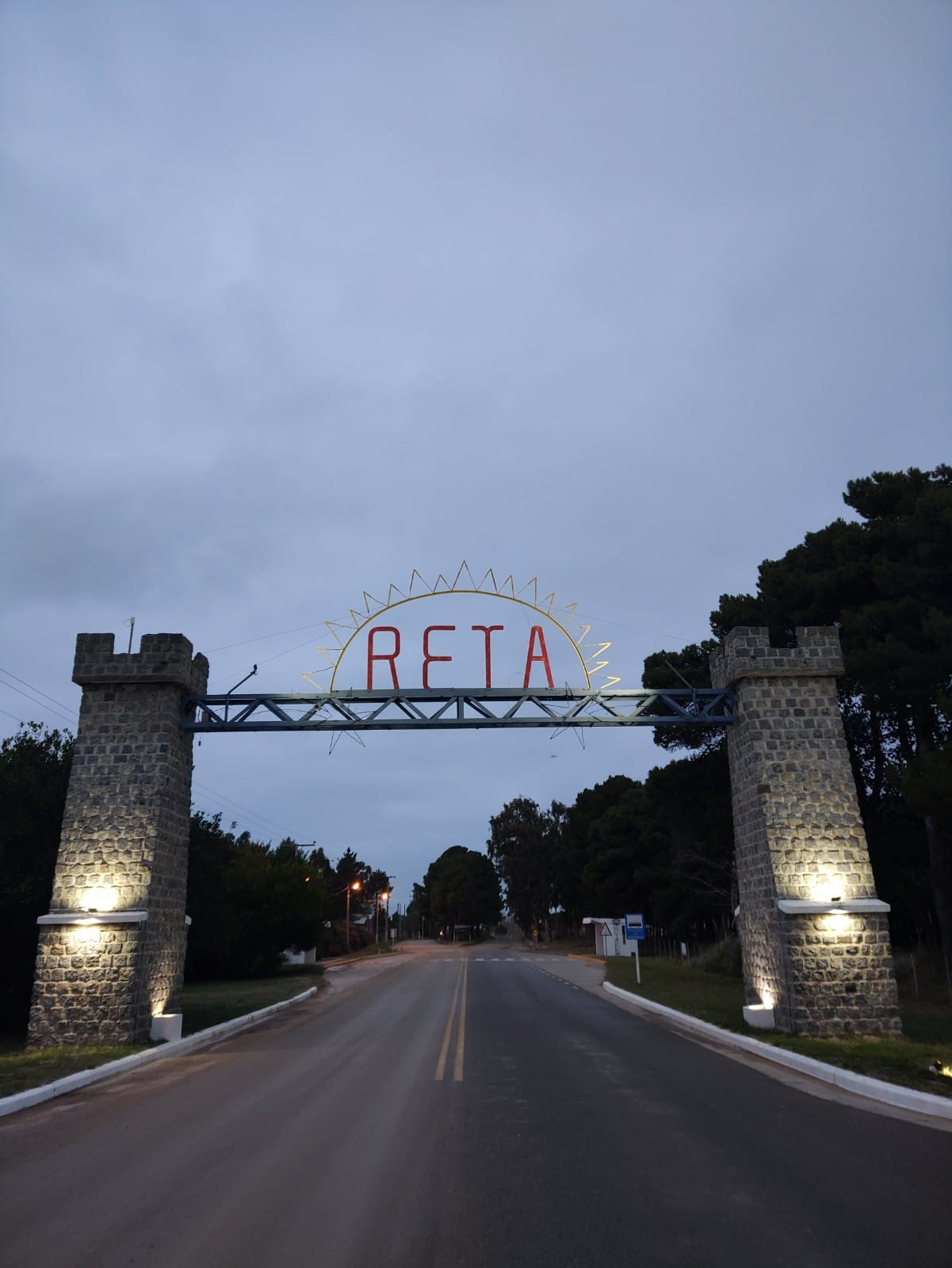
- Entrance to the town, 2023

- Location within Buenos Aires Province
- Coordinates: 38°53′S 60°20′W
- Country: Argentina
- Province: Buenos Aires
- Partidos: Tres Arroyos
- Established: November 28, 1929
- Elevation: 16 m (52 ft)

Population (2001 Census)
  - Total: 289
- Time zone: UTC−3 (ART)
- CPA Base: B 7511
- Climate: Dfc

Reta is a town located in the Tres Arroyos Partido in the province of Buenos Aires, Argentina.

== Geography ==
Reta is located 84 km (52 mi) from the city of Tres Arroyos, and roughly 580 km (360 mi) from the city of Buenos Aires.

== History ==
Reta was founded on November 28, 1929, by Martín Reta, who in 1927 began laying out what would become the town to promote seaside tourism to the area. The town's population began to grow rapidly in the 1940s, with wealthier Argentines buying land in the area.

== Population ==
According to INDEC, which collects population data for the country, the town had a population of 289 people as of the 2001 census.
