= Coronel Pringles =

- City
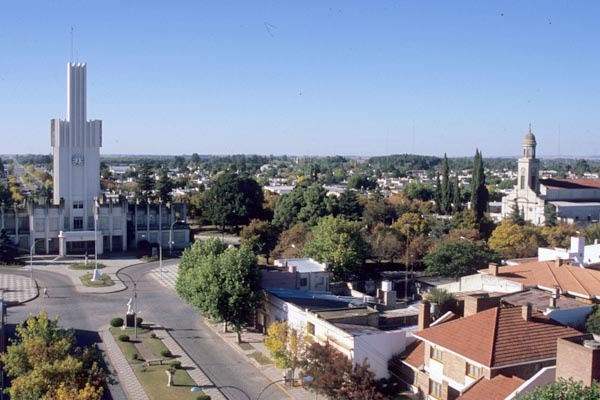

- Location in Argentina
- Coordinates: 37°58′S 61°01′W
- Country: Argentina
- Province: Buenos Aires
- Partido: Coronel Pringles
- Founded: September 24, 1882
- Elevation: 297 m (974 ft)

Population (2010 census)
  - Total: 20,263
- CPA Base: B 7530
- Area code: +54 2922

Coronel Pringles (Spanish: [koɾoˈnel ˈpɾiŋgles]) is a city in the south of the Buenos Aires Province in Argentina, situated near the mountains of Pillahuincó. It is the government seat of the Coronel Pringles Partido.

In 1882, the provincial government of Buenos Aires created the partido ("civil parish") of Coronel Pringles by dividing the territory of Tres Arroyos into the partidos of Coronel Suárez, Tres Arroyos and Coronel Pringles. The latter, and its main town, were named after Coronel Juan Pascual Pringles, a member of a grenadiers regiment of General San Martín's army that fought in the wars of independence against the Spanish.

Located a distance of 120 km (75 mi) from Bahía Blanca and 518 km (322 mi) from Buenos Aires, Pringles has a population of around 23,794 inhabitants (2001). Its main economic activities are agriculture, and sheep and cattle raising.

== History ==
The area now part of Coronel Pringles sat on lands belonging to the Tehuelche people prior to colonization by the Spanish. In 1858, the land now making up the partido began to be leased to settlers. By the late 1870s, most resistance from the natives of the region had been quashed, and as a result, twelve villages, including Coronel Pringles, were to be constructed in the region. The town was founded by Don Juan Pablo Cabrera, a settler who owned land in the region. Coronel Pringles was settled by large numbers of Italian, French and Spanish immigrants. In 1934, Coronel Pringles was incorporated as a city.

== Climate ==
Climate data for Coronel Pringles (1991–2020, extremes 1994–present)
Month	Jan	Feb	Mar	Apr	May	Jun	Jul	Aug	Sep	Oct	Nov	Dec	Year
Record high °C (°F)	40.1 (104.2)	38.0 (100.4)	36.1 (97.0)	32.4 (90.3)	28.8 (83.8)	22.6 (72.7)	23.6 (74.5)	30.6 (87.1)	30.6 (87.1)	35.1 (95.2)	36.2 (97.2)	37.7 (99.9)	40.1 (104.2)
Mean daily maximum °C (°F)	29.3 (84.7)	27.5 (81.5)	24.9 (76.8)	20.4 (68.7)	16.4 (61.5)	13.3 (55.9)	12.5 (54.5)	14.9 (58.8)	17.2 (63.0)	20.0 (68.0)	24.3 (75.7)	28.1 (82.6)	20.7 (69.3)
Daily mean °C (°F)	21.5 (70.7)	19.9 (67.8)	17.5 (63.5)	13.2 (55.8)	9.9 (49.8)	7.1 (44.8)	6.2 (43.2)	7.8 (46.0)	10.1 (50.2)	13.4 (56.1)	17.0 (62.6)	20.2 (68.4)	13.7 (56.7)
Mean daily minimum °C (°F)	13.7 (56.7)	13.0 (55.4)	11.0 (51.8)	7.3 (45.1)	4.8 (40.6)	1.9 (35.4)	1.1 (34.0)	2.2 (36.0)	3.5 (38.3)	6.8 (44.2)	9.4 (48.9)	12.0 (53.6)	7.2 (45.0)
Record low °C (°F)	0.2 (32.4)	2.4 (36.3)	0.2 (32.4)	−5.0 (23.0)	−7.7 (18.1)	−11.8 (10.8)	−12.0 (10.4)	−9.5 (14.9)	−8.0 (17.6)	−6.1 (21.0)	−1.8 (28.8)	0.7 (33.3)	−12.0 (10.4)
Average precipitation mm (inches)	73.9 (2.91)	91.5 (3.60)	81.9 (3.22)	62.9 (2.48)	37.9 (1.49)	22.5 (0.89)	37.0 (1.46)	38.3 (1.51)	50.6 (1.99)	93.2 (3.67)	82.4 (3.24)	81.2 (3.20)	753.3 (29.66)
Average precipitation days (≥ 0.1 mm)	7.4	7.6	7.4	6.5	6.0	5.0	5.5	5.5	6.6	8.6	8.1	7.8	81.9
Average snowy days	0.0	0.0	0.0	0.0	0.0	0.1	0.1	0.0	0.0	0.0	0.0	0.0	0.2
Average relative humidity (%)	61.5	68.7	74.4	76.1	79.5	77.5	76.4	72.9	71.4	71.5	65.6	61.2	71.4
Source: Servicio Meteorológico Nacional

== Notable people ==
- Juan Carlos Thorry (1908–2000) film actor, tango musician.
- César Aira, writer, born 1949
- Arturo Carrera, poet, born 1948
- Celeste Carballo, singer and composer of rock music, born 1956
- Esteban Fernandino II (1944–2007), racing driver.
- Nicolás Covatti, speedway rider, born 1988.
- Sebastián Saavedra, professional golf player, born 1986.
