= Tres Arroyos Airport =

Airport in Argentina

- IATA: OYO; ICAO: SAZH

Summary
- Airport type: Public
- Serves: Tres Arroyos, Argentina
- Elevation AMSL: 400 ft (120 m)
- Coordinates: 38°23′15″S 60°19′50″W

Map
- Location of the airport in Argentina

Runways
| Direction | Length | | Surface |
| Direction | m | ft | Surface |
|---|---|---|---|
| 04/22 | 720 | 2,362 | Grass |
| 14/32 | 1,060 | 3,478 | Grass |
| 18/36 | 1,280 | 4,199 | Concrete |
- Sources: WAD SkyVector Google Maps

Tres Arroyos Airport (IATA: OYO, ICAO: SAZH) is an airport serving Tres Arroyos, a city in the Buenos Aires Province of Argentina. The airport is just west of the city.

== Airlines and destinations ==
| Airlines | Destinations |
|---|---|
| Humming Airways | Buenos Aires–Aeroparque |

== See also ==
- Transport in Argentina
- List of airports in Argentina
