= Jake Jabs =

American businessman (born 1930)

- Born: Jacob Jabs; November 12, 1930 (age 95); Lodge Grass, Montana, U.S.
- Education: Montana State College, BS (1952); Montana State University, Hon. DBA (2012)
- Occupation: Businessman
- Known for: Founder and CEO of American Furniture Warehouse
- Political party: Republican Party

Jake Jabs (born 1930) is an American businessman, philanthropist, and United States Air Force veteran. He is the founder and CEO of American Furniture Warehouse (AFW), a chain of furniture stores in Colorado, Texas, and Arizona.

Jabs makes political donations to the Republican Party and conservative organizations. In 1985, he announced an intent to run for the United States Senate in the state of Colorado, but was deemed ineligible because he was not registered as a Republican. He was criticized for advocating to other people to vote, when he had not done so in the prior decade.

The Jake Jabs College of Business and Entrepreneurship and Jake Jabs Center for Entrepreneurship are named after him due to his substantial donations to Montana State University and the University of Colorado Denver.

== Early life and education ==
Jabs was born in the rural outskirts of Lodge Grass, Montana, as one of 9 children to a Volga German mother and Vistula German father, (Note: Several sources claim that Jabs is Polish, Russian, and Jewish. Jabs has stated that he is not Jewish, and that his parents were Ethnic Germans whose ancestors migrated to the Russia–Poland border and the Volga River Valley during Catherine the Great's reign.) both of whom fled Soviet Russia. Jabs' father was drafted into the Russian Army during the Polish–Soviet War, after the Russians invaded his family's farm on the Russia–Poland border. He then immigrated to Brazil for two years where he worked as a carpenter before joining his family in Detroit, where he was introduced to Jabs' mother through family. He then relocated to Montana, where she was living. Jabs and his siblings grew up working on a family farm, where they sharecropped the sugar beets they grew. They were impoverished and their home lacked any indoor plumbing or electricity. Jabs' father played the violin, and despite that they were poor, he prioritized obtaining musical instruments for Jabs and his siblings. Jabs played the banjo and the guitar. Jabs said that because his father only had a second-grade education, he instilled in them the importance of education. Jabs attended Hardin High School, from which he graduated in 1948.

Jabs then attended Montana State College, where he joined the Reserve Officers' Training Corps (ROTC) and intended to become a high school teacher. He played in the college's marching band and was on the school's rodeo team. He graduated with a Bachelor of Science in Vocational Agriculture in 1952.

In 2012, Montana State University awarded Jabs an honorary doctorate degree.

== Career ==
After graduating college, Jabs briefly taught guitar lessons at a music store in Bozeman. However, due to his ROTC commitment, Jabs served in the United States Air Force for two years during the Korean War. He was stationed primarily at bases across various parts of Europe and later at an American Post Office in Morocco as a security courier. When he completed his duty, he relocated to Nashville, Tennessee, to attempt a career in music. He briefly played lead guitar for Marty Robbins, before deciding to go into business because he wasn't a good enough singer.

Jabs then returned to Bozeman, where he became a co-partner in a music store called Montana Music, where he continued teaching music lessons to customers. After he bought out his partner and became the sole owner, he started selling televisions and stereos in the store alongside the musical instruments. After realizing from selling electronics that furniture was in high demand, he purchased a carload of discount furniture and sold it to his customers. His business was successful and he opened more music stores, until he opened a music store in Billings, where he said he suffered a "rude awakening." He had been successful by discounting his prices to beat all of the other stores. He then lost interest in the music industry and sold all of his stores.

=== Furniture stores ===
After retiring from music store ownership, Jabs purchased a failing high-end furniture store in Denver, Colorado, Mediterranean furniture store, and a failing furniture factory in Bridger, Montana, Lazy Bones. He renamed his new furniture stores Mediterranean Galleries and the factory the Yellowstone Manufacturing Company. He opened new furniture stores in other areas of Colorado and a location in Billings. Due to dwindling sales and a loss of interest in the Mediterranean furniture fad, Jabs closed and liquidated the stores in 1974. The furniture factory was later renamed again to Loren Mitchell in 1992. Jabs sold it in 2004.

The same year that Jabs liquidated his furniture stores, another Colorado furniture store that had been in business since 1898, the American Furniture Company, closed and liquidated their inventory suddenly after its parent company had failed to pay its leases and an involuntary bankruptcy petition had been opened against them. The assets at the Denver store and warehouse were worth more than US$1,500,000. In 1975, Jabs founded a new company, the American Furniture Warehouse Company (AFW), and used all of the money he had to make a deal for the remaining assets, which included forklifts, for US$80,000. Jabs said, "...I figured I made a million bucks that day." He re-opened the store at 58th Avenue and Bannock the following June, making him the owner of the largest furniture store in the state.

By 1979, AFW was one of Colorado's largest retail businesses; by 1984, it was among the largest furniture stores in the country.

== Politics and philanthropy ==
=== 1986 Republican US Senate campaign in Colorado ===
Early in 1985, Jabs was identified as a potential Republican Party nominee for United States Senate in Colorado when Gary Hart considered whether or not to run for re-election following his withdrawal from the 1984 United States presidential election. Jabs said that his goal was to reduce regulations and paperwork for small business owners. On May 26, 1985, he announced his intent to campaign in the Republican primary election for the 1986 Senate race.

Jabs was deemed ineligible to run as a Republican candidate. In 1968, when Jabs and his family relocated from Montana to Colorado, Jabs said he was registered as a Republican voter. When his family moved houses in 1977, he said his wife re-registered them both to vote. Law prohibits spouses from selecting party affiliations on their spouses behalf. According to Jabs, he was then automatically registered as unaffiliated with any party, which he had been unaware of. However, Jabs had not voted in any primary or general election during the prior decade. Jabs registered as a Republican, and re-affirmed his intent to run in mid-July. The following week, the Arapahoe County Clerk, Marjorie Page, provided records that showed he had never been registered as a Republican in that county since at least 1975. Page said that if he had voted in a primary election, he would have automatically been registered as a member of the Republican party. He was notified after failing to vote in 1978 and 1982 Gubernatorial elections that he had been dropped from the voter rolls. In both cases, he re-registered as an unaffiliated voter. On July 1, 1985, a new state ballot access law had taken effect which required candidates to be registered with a party for at least one year prior to candidacy, which meant the deadline for Jabs to register had passed on June 27.

Jabs sued the Secretary of State of Colorado, Natalie Meyer, calling the law unconstitutionally retroactive. The suit was quickly dismissed a district judge as premature, arguing that the matter would not be ripe for the courts to hear until June 1986, calling the controversy "imagined" and "speculative." Jabs disputed this, arguing he would first have to invest his time and hundreds of thousands of dollars in campaign advertising first. He appealed the case to the Colorado Supreme Court, which they declined to hear.

While Jabs presented his ineligibility to run as a "fluke," his lack of voting over the previous decade was scrutinized by the press. The Westminster Sentinel wrote that Jabs had handed out pamphlets that stated "register to vote — never miss an election," and failed to take his own advice, making his excuse weak. The Daily Sentinel argued that if Jabs couldn't manage to register to vote, then he wasn't a suitable Senate candidate.

=== Donations ===
Jabs donates to the Republican Party and supports anti-union measures. In 2008, he paid for advertisements pushing Coloradans to vote for a right-to-work law. He also pledged US$300,000 to the American Tradition Partnership.

In 2011, Jabs donated $25 million to Montana State University for the Jake Jabs College of Business and Entrepreneurship and Jabs Hall. It was the largest single donation in the University's history. He also funds the University of Colorado Denver's Jake Jabs Center for Entrepreneurship.

== Awards and honors ==
- Colorado Business Hall of Fame
- American Heritage Award, Anti-Defamation League, 2012

== Popular culture ==
Jabs was referenced in Guitar Queer-O, an episode of the cartoon South Park.
