= Jake Jabs Center for Entrepreneurship =

The Jake Jabs Center for Entrepreneurship is an entrepreneurial concept development center and a graduate and undergraduate-level entrepreneurial training center at the University of Colorado Denver Business School.

== History ==
Denver philanthropist Richard Bard provided start-up funding for the Center, which was named Bard Center for Entrepreneurship in 1996. In 2013 the Center was renamed the Jake Jabs Center For Entrepreneurship after Jake Jabs, a Denver-based furniture baron, donated $10 million to the center, largely due to his friendship with the Center's director, Professor Madhavan Parthasarathy. As of March 2014, this was the largest single donation in the history of CU Denver's downtown campus, and the largest single donation ever made by an individual entrepreneur to a Business School department or Center. In 2018, Jabs donated a further $2 million, increasing the value of his gift to $12 million.

== Programs ==
The Center offers graduate and undergraduate AACSB accredited courses, with entrepreneurship being one of CU Denver's most popular MBA specializations. Furthermore, specializations in entrepreneurship are offered as part of the MS in Management, MS in Marketing, MS International Business, and MS in Information Systems programs. The Center offers several graduate and undergraduate programs, including 1) graduate MBA specialization in entrepreneurship, 2) graduate certificate in entrepreneurship, 3) graduate certificate in bio-entrepreneurship, 4) graduate international entrepreneurship certificate/badge, 5) undergraduate major in entrepreneurship for business students, 6) undergraduate minor in entrepreneurship, offered to non-business students, and finally 7) undergraduate certificate in entrepreneurship.

The Jake Jabs Center provides an accelerator program for start-up businesses. The Center also offers mentorship programs, the Best of Colorado speaker events, and its signature event THE CLIMB Business Plan Competition. THE CLIMB is open to any Colorado collegiate team and more than $25,000 worth of monetary and in-kind prizes are awarded each year.

== CLIMB competitions ==
=== 2018 CLIMB Competition results ===
| Business Name | Result |
|---|---|
| Vita Inclinata Technologies | 1st Place |
| Project [un]Contained | 2nd Place & Social Impact Award |
| Park-It | People's Choice Award |
| Trailhead Woodwork | Dean's Innovation Award |
| GeriAssist | Finalist |
| Barrel Maven | Finalist |

=== Fall 2017 Competition results ===
| Business Name | Result |
|---|---|
| Diagnosis AI | Collegiate 1st Place |
| Boogaloo Beds | Community 1st Place |
| Local Beer Connection | Collegiate 2nd Place |
| Spinhead Media | Community 2nd Place |
| Nutrition Leaders | Collegiate People's Choice Award |
| Silver Spoons Kitchen | Community People's Choice Award |
| UtiliChair | Collegiate Finalist |
| Pantree | Collegiate Finalist |
| Milk Stash | Community Finalist |

=== Spring 2017 Competition results ===
| Business Name | Result |
|---|---|
| Botanex | Collegiate 1st Place |
| PuppTech | Collegiae 2nd Place |
| Heart Beets | Graduate People's Choice Award |
| SUBLMNL | Undergraduate People's Choice Award |
| SpinPulse | Graduate Finalist |
| STACKED Homes | Graduate Finalist |
| SHRPA | Graduate Finalist |
| FiXDLY | Graduate Finalist |
| Science Playhouse | Graduate Finalist |
| WAKup | Undergraduate Finalist |

=== 2016 Competition results ===
| Business Name | Result |
|---|---|
| BARVENTURE | Collegiate 1st Place |
| LITHIC Nutrition (now known as Lithic Foods) | Community 1st Place |
| Pocket Passer | Collegiate 2nd Place |
| Barmade | Community 2nd Place |
| Veloce Corporation | Collegiate 3rd Place |

=== 2015 Competition results ===
| Business Name | Result |
|---|---|
| Living Ink Technologies | 1st Place |
| Pronto Express Carwash | 2nd Place |
| Crea+e Coffee | 3rd Place |
| Nile Travel | Finalist |
| PetraFluids Energy | Finalist |
| Gist Spirits | Finalist |

=== 2014 Competition results ===
| Business Name | Result |
|---|---|
| Superior Ecotech | 1st Place |
| SuperCryt Technologies | 2nd Place |
| GeoCity | 3rd Place |
| Red's Shed | Finalist |
| Knob Where You Need It | Finalist |
| YouGlycemia | Finalist |

=== 2013 Competition results ===
| Business Name | Result |
|---|---|
| Allergy Solutions | 1st Place |
| Nanoly | 2nd Place & Best Bioscience |
| Fenix Paddles | 3rd Place |
| BlBabylon Produce | Finalist |
| BH Apparel | Finalist |
| SnowGate | Finalist |

=== 2012 Competition results ===
| Business Name | Result |
|---|---|
| AppIt Ventures | Co-1st Place |
| MicroBeautifuli.com, LLC | Co-1st Place |
| Empire Bagels, LLC (now Rosenberg's Bagels and Delicatessen) | 3rd Place |
| Blue Sun Restaurant | Finalist |
| Clean Sling, LLC | Finalist |
| Two Sisters, Inc. | Finalist |
| DiningEvo | Finalist |

=== 2011 Competition results ===
| Business Name | Result |
|---|---|
| Viktorian Guitars | 1st Place |
| Microsopy Learning Systems | 2nd Place |
| RoomCycles | 3rd Place |
| Clubhouse Executive Coaches | Finalist |
| The Ski Lift | Finalist |
| Vanguard Medical Systems | Finalist |

=== 2010 Competition results ===
| Business Name | Result |
|---|---|
| caraSolva | 1st Place |
| Diego Zhang's Burger Cafe | 3rd Place |
| Shelter-Me Photography | Finalist, Best Nonprofit Award and Best Non-profit |
| ePRepSolutions, LL | Finalist |
| Physical Activity Innovation | Finalist |

=== 2009 Competition results ===
| Business Name | Result |
|---|---|
| Olomomo Nut Company | 1st Place |
| The Organic Dish | 2nd Place |
| VibraLung, Inc. | 3rd Place and Best Bioscience Award |
| Global CafeNation | Finalist, Best Nonprofit Award and Best International |
| Western States Biopharmaceuticals, Inc. | Finalist |
| Also Energy | Finalist |

=== 2008 Competition results ===
| Business Name | Result |
|---|---|
| Developing Minds Software | 1st Place |
| Gobai Culturally Inspired Cuisine | 2nd Place |
| Snoasis Medical Inc. | 3rd Place |
| Healthy Travels | Finalist and Best International Award |
| Robotics Assisted Gait Training | Finalist and Best Nonprofit Award |
| Tissue Genetics | Finalist and Best Bioscience Award |
