= Claromecó =

- Town
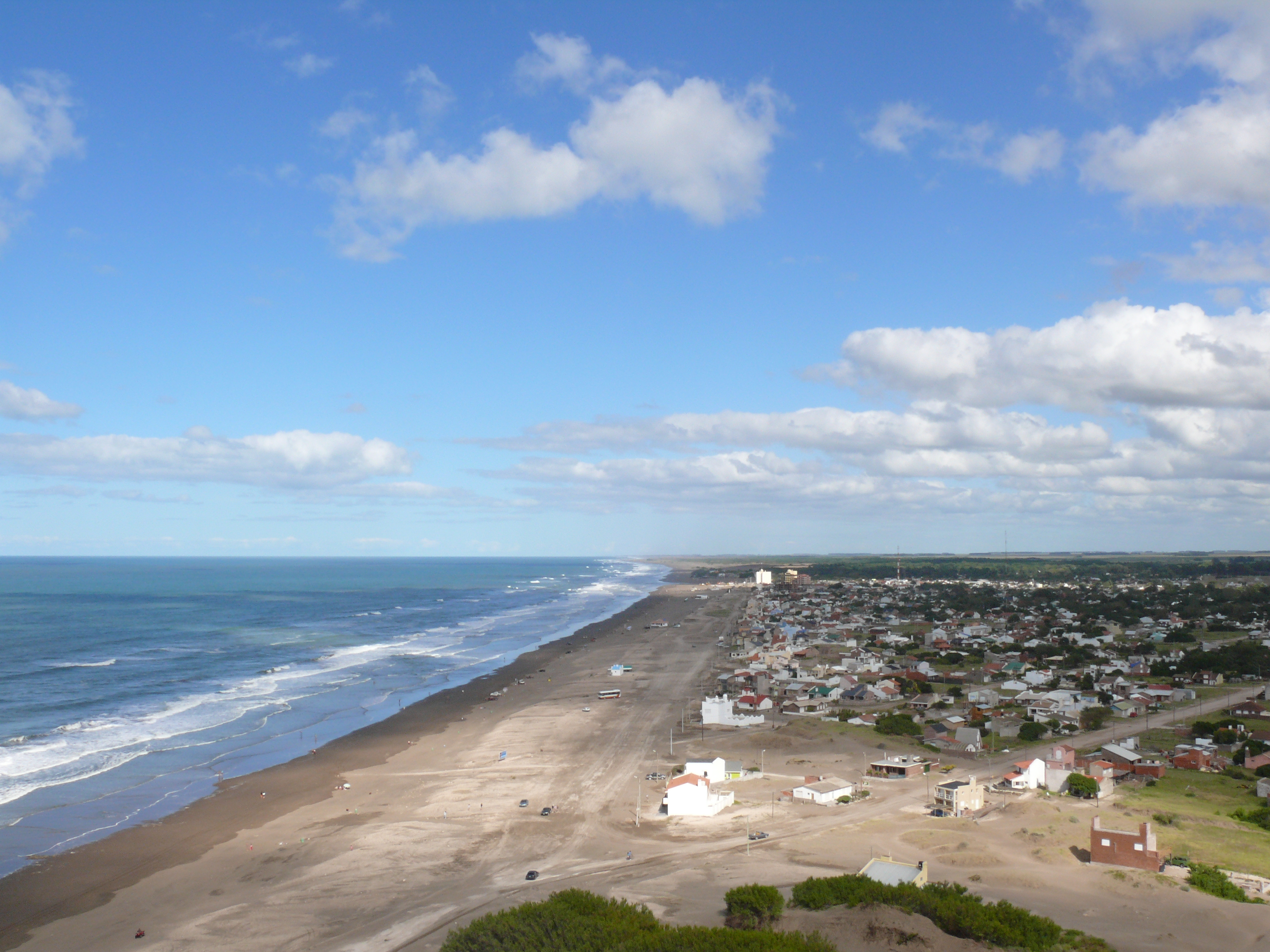
- Aerial view of Claromecó

- Flag

- Location within Buenos Aires Province
- Coordinates: 38°51′S 60°05′W
- Country: Argentina
- Province: Buenos Aires
- Partidos: Bahía Blanca
- Established: November 9, 1920
- Elevation: 12 m (39 ft)

Population (2001 Census)
  - Total: 1,947
- Time zone: UTC−3 (ART)
- CPA Base: B 7505
- Area code: +291 457-XXXX
- Climate: Dfc

Claromecó is a resort town of the Atlantic Coast located in the Tres Arroyos Partido in the province of Buenos Aires in Argentina. It is a popular destination for seaside tourism, including activities such as surfing and fishing. The town's name roughly translates to "three streams with junks" in the Mapuche language.

== Geography ==
Claromecó is located 71 km (44 mi) from Tres Arroyos. Claromecó is located within the Claromecó Basin, a geological basin which possibly contains sizable deposits of coal and other sources of energy.

== History ==
The area around Claromecó was first visited by Europeans in 1746 by José Cardiel, a Jesuit priest. The earliest landowners in the town were recorded in 1836, settling in areas that had previously been designated for cattle farming six years earlier in 1830. The first hotel in what would become the town opened in 1901, followed by the construction of houses around a decade later.

The land that is now Claromecó formerly belonged to a wealthy family, the Bellocqs, who would often receive requests from nearby locals for permission to visit the beach on their land. in 1919, the Bellocqs petitioned the Argentine government to allow the creation of an official town on their land. The town was founded on November 9, 1920. A 54 m (177 ft) tall lighthouse was constructed in the town in 1922. Following this, the early design of the town was headed by architect Jorge Bunge, which started in 1925 and was largely completed by 1928. Bunge and the Bellocqs also unsuccessfully attempted to create a rail link between the town and Tres Arroyos. Claromecó was primarily settled by immigrants of Danish origin.

In 1999, a 70 m (230 ft) windmill was completed in the town.

== Population ==
According to INDEC, which collects population data for the country, the town had a population of 1,947 people as of the 2001 census.

== Parks ==
A large 11.63 km^{2} (4.49 sq mi) protected park, the Claromecó Municipal Nature Reserve, is located east of Claromecó, home primarily to coastal wetlands and sand dunes, as well as various species of grasses, birds and lizards.

A 2000-hectare tree nursery is also present near Claromecó. Much of it was temporarily destroyed in a fire in 2000.
