= Coronel Suárez Partido =

Coronel Suarez Partido de Coronel Suarez
- Department
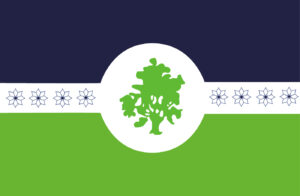
- Flag

- location of Coronel Suarez Partido in Buenos Aires Province
- Coordinates: 31°28′S 61°56′W
- Country: Argentina
- Established: May 28, 1883
- Founder: Eduardo Casey
- Seat: Coronel Suárez

Government
  - Intendant: Ricardo Moccero (Union for the Homeland)

Area
  - Total: 6,000 km^{2} (2,300 sq mi)

Population
  - Total: 36,828
  - Density: 6.1/km^{2} (16/sq mi)
- Demonym: suarense
- Postal Code: B7540
- IFAM: BUE032
- Area Code: 02926
- Website: coronelsuarez.gob.ar

The partido of Coronel Suárez (German: Partido Oberst Suárez) is a subdivision of the Province of Buenos Aires in Argentina. In the south-central part of the province, it was created in 1882 by the provincial government when they divided the territory of Tres Arroyos into the partidos of Coronel Suárez, Tres Arroyos and Coronel Pringles.

It has a population of about 37,000 inhabitants in an area of 6,000 km^{2} (2,317 sq mi), and its capital city is Coronel Suárez, which is 550 km (342 mi) from Buenos Aires.

Its population is mainly of Volga German descent.

== Settlements ==
- Coronel Suárez, 22,311
- Huanguelén, pop.4,955, 56 km (35 mi) from Suárez
- Santa Trinidad, pop.1,859
- San José, pop.2,127
- Santa María, pop.1,770
- Villa Arcadia, pop.305
- Pasman, 208, 37 km (23 mi) from Suárez
- Curamalal, 104, 22 km (14 mi) from Suárez
- D'Orbigny, 49, 40 km (25 mi) from Suárez
- Cascada, 16, 52 km (32 mi) from Suárez
- Quiñihual, 57 km (35 mi) from Suárez
- Bathurts, 20 km (12 mi) from Suárez
- Ombú, 49 km (30 mi) from Suárez
- Primavera, 18 km (11 mi) from Suárez
- Otoño, 71 km (44 mi) from Suárez
- Piñeyro, 18 km (11 mi) from Suárez
- Zoilo, 94 km (58 mi) from Suárez

== Airfield ==
- Brig D Hector Eduardo Ruiz (SAZC)
- Elevation: 234 m (768 ft)
- Coordinates: 37°26'46"S 61°53'21"W
- Runways: One paved runway, 1,318 m (4,324 ft) × 27 m (89 ft)
