= American Furniture Warehouse =

American furniture retailer

- Company type: Privately held
- Industry: Furniture retailer
- Founded: 1898; 128 years ago (as American Furniture Company); 1975; 51 years ago (as American Furniture Warehouse)
- Headquarters: Meridian, Colorado, United States
- Number of locations: 18 (10 in Colorado, 5 in Arizona & 3 in Texas)
- Key people: Jake Jabs (CEO); Jackie Brookshire (president)
- Products: Furniture, Bedding
- Revenue: $858.39 million (2025)
- Owner: Jake Jabs
- Number of employees: 4,312 (2025)
- Website: afw.com

American Furniture Warehouse (AFW) is an American furniture retailer in Colorado, Arizona, and Texas. It is headquartered in Meridian, Colorado, founded by Jake Jabs in 1975 beginning its operations with one store in Denver, which had previously been the location of the American Furniture Company (AFC) founded in 1898. In 1974, AFC was liquidated, and Jabs subsequently purchased the Denver warehouse's assets. When AFW re-opened the store on Bannock Street, it was the largest furniture store in Colorado.

AFC was the largest company of its kind in the US in 1943. In 1967, after Kohn's death, it was sold to American Investment Company (AIC), where it operated as a subsidiary of the St. Louis-based American National Stores, Inc. In 1974, AIC closed and liquidated all five AFC stores. Jabs acquired the company's Denver assets and reopened its Bannock Street location in 1975 as American Furniture Warehouse. By 1979, it had grown into one of the largest retailers in Colorado and, by 1984, one of the largest in the US. AFW has expanded to other locations, with stores in Arizona and Texas.

AFW and Jabs became known in Colorado for the company's advertising. Television commercials for AFW featured Jabs, sometimes accompanied by exotic animals such as tigers, bears, and monkeys. Some animals used in AFW commercials were seized and transferred from their trainer as part of a federal investigation into illegal trafficking of endangered animals. As of 2010, Jabs announced that AFW commercials featuring exotic animals were likely to cease airing due to an increase in restrictions.

== Structure and leadership ==
The current AFW corporate headquarters is located at 8820 American Way in Meridian, Colorado, an unincorporated community in Douglas County near E-470. At the end of 2025, it employed 4,312 people, with 23% of them working at the headquarters location. In the 2025 fiscal year, AFW had $858.39 million in total sales.

Jackie Brookshire, one of Jabs' daughters, succeeded her father as company president in 2020, with Jabs remaining AFW's CEO. As of November 2025, the 95-year-old Jabs was still AFW's CEO, with Brookshire still the company president. As of May 2025, after 50 years since being reconstituted under Jabs, AFW operated 18 locations in Colorado, Arizona, and Texas. Besides its physical stores, AFW has also sold furniture and hosted wedding registries online.

== History ==
=== American Furniture Company ===
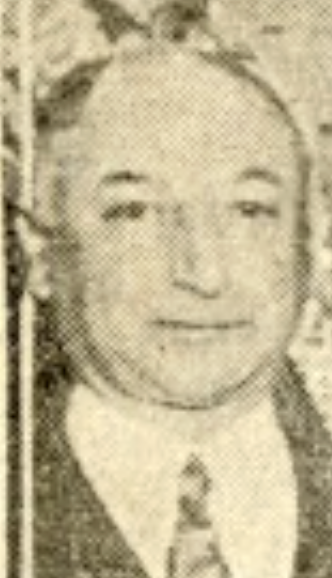
Samuel E. Kohn, the founder of the American Furniture Company, 1928

In 1898, the American Furniture Company (AFC) was founded in Denver, Colorado, United States. It was legally incorporated in the city in March 1900 by Samuel E. Kohn, S. M. Witz, and George A. Smith, with a valuation of $20,000 ($618,000 in 2024). Kohn, the son of the Jewish Denverite Isaac Kohn, worked in the business until his 1943 death. He owned the business until he sold it in 1923 to the Chicago-based Hartman Company. Kohn bought the company back in 1930 and remained its president until his death. In 1928, as president of the AFC, Kohn was among the Denver business leaders to establish a Better Business Bureau in the city. By the time of Kohn's death, his company was the largest of its kind in the US.

Kohn's son, Robert S. Kohn, succeeded his father and ran the company until 1966. Over the course of its operation, the company developed a reputation as a progressive business and employer. In 1950, it transitioned its employees to a five-day workweek, becoming one of the few American companies west of the Mississippi River to operate with that shortened schedule. Employees worked from 9 AM to 5:30 PM, bringing their weekly work hours down from 45 hours for male employees and 43 hours for female employees.

The company eventually expanded south and opened a location in Colorado Springs. There, another company of the same name was headquartered and operated. The Colorado Supreme Court ruled in 1953 that both companies could continue their operations in the city despite the Colorado Springs firm's claims of harm to their business stemming from the shared name, with the court noting that the Colorado Springs company had instead benefited from the advertising by the Denver company.

In 1967, the company was sold to the American Investment Company (AIC), and continued operations as a subsidiary of American National Stores (ANS), the company which held the leases for AIC's retail stores. By 1972, AFC was the oldest complete furniture store chain in Colorado. That year, under the Colorado general manager William V. Drake, American Furniture continued its expansion in the Denver market by leasing a 16,800-square-foot (1,560 m^{2}) building on Colfax Avenue in Aurora.

The American Furniture Company was acquired by six of its employees in January 1974. In October 1974, an involuntary bankruptcy petition was filed against ANS in Missouri after they failed to pay rent to a lessor in that state on the first of the month. The following day, the Public Acceptance Corporation, another subsidiary of the AIC, repossessed all of AFC's assets and Drake announced that all five of its Colorado locations were closing. It liquidated all of its assets a few days later. The bankruptcy petition against ANS was withdrawn after it settled with its creditors in January 1975.

=== Founding and growth ===
In 1975, Jake Jabs founded the American Furniture Warehouse Company (AFW) and bought AFC's assets in Denver for US$80,000 in cash, which was worth more than US$1,500,000. Jabs said of the purchase, "...I figured I made a million bucks that day." When AFW re-opened the store at 5445 North Bannock Street in June 1975, AFW had the largest furniture store in the state. With Jabs as its president, AFW hoped to capitalize on the recent departure of furniture chains from other states. Coming out of the 1973–1975 recession, Jabs – who already had experience in the furniture industry – tailored the business to a consumer base that had less money to spend and was more willing to buy generic products.

In 1979, AFW had sales worth over $15 million ($52.1 million in 2024), making one of the largest retail businesses in Colorado. The first satellite location of AFW opened the following year, the North Bannock location remaining the company's flagship location. By the time the 26,000-square-foot (2,400 m^{2}) Fort Collins store Briarwood Furniture was purchased in 1982 as AFW's eighth location, AFW had expanded into Idaho. By 1984, AFW was among the largest furniture stores in the US.

AFW briefly expanded into Montana, but in 1985, a Yellowstone County, Montana, judge ruled that an AFW store in Montana could not operate using any combination of "American" or "furniture" in its name due to the prior presence of American Furniture Inc. in the state. Jabs attempted to appeal the decision, but the Montana Supreme Court denied his appeal. The subsequent 1986 closure of the Billings, Montana, location (which had been renamed to as the Jake Jabs Furniture Warehouse) cost the company $200,000 ($484,000 in 2024). In the year prior to the Billings location closing, AFW had closed a location in southern Denver and another in Idaho. It was also preparing to close the two remaining stores in Idaho, with Jabs citing increased cost.

By 1993, AFW was doing $60 million ($117 million in 2024) in sales a year, during which time wealth moved away from the city towards Denver's suburbs. AFW then broke ground on a new 347,000-square-foot (32,200 m^{2}) flagship store in Thornton that September to replace their original Bannock Street location. In 1999, it closed its two Montana stores, withdrawing from the state.

=== 21st century ===
According to the furniture industry weekly magazine Furniture Today, AFW had the 24th highest sales among American furniture companies in 2000. That year, the company recorded $275 million ($475 million in 2024) in furniture sales and $275.7 million ($476 million in 2024) in total revenue.

In 2018, AFW acquired two properties in the Houston suburbs to construct its first stores in Texas. Among these was a 52-acre property upon which the company planned to construct a 855,000-square-foot (79,400 m^{2}) store. The first of the Texan AFWs had opened by 2020. AFW also expanded into Arizona, with three stores open by the 2020s.

== Advertising ==
Throughout the 1980s, AFW's advertisements drove business to the retailers in Denver's Furniture Row area on Bannock Street off north Broadway in the 1980s and 1990s. Of the more than 20 furnishing businesses on Furniture Row, AFW was the biggest advertiser for 17 years. When AFW planned to relocate away from Denver due to consumers shifting their sales to the suburbs, another retailer said that AFW drove business to the area, and would have to consider increasing advertising or also moving to the suburbs.

In 1978, AFW celebrated its 80th anniversary by announcing concerts by Johnny Rodriguez, Freddy Fender, Hank Thompson, and Tammy Wynette. Billy Carter, a businessman and the brother of US president Jimmy Carter, also made an appearance for the AFW anniversary, part of his efforts to financially benefit from his brother's presidency. When asked how much he was being paid to appear on behalf of AFW, Carter said it was "None of your damned business". AFW sponsored additional events with celebrities, such as with the musicians Jody Miller and Don Williams in 1979.

=== Television commercials ===
Jabs engaged in a significant advertising drive for AFW, spending $700,000 in 1979 ($2.43 million in 2024) on television commercials. In 1980, he estimated that AFW was running 240 television commercials a week in Colorado.

AFW's television advertisements were known for featuring exotic animals, including a lion cub, a bear, and particularly tigers, with Jabs, becoming part of the public's perception regarding the company and Jabs. According to Jab's personal secretary Barbara Brown in 1981, the animals' presence in AFW's commercials had drawn criticism from some viewers but had become popular with others. An editor at the newspaper The Rocky Mountain News expressed her affinity for the commercials, saying "At least Jabs' advertising is not phony, done by phony people".

In 1982, federal charges were filed against Sidney J. Yost, the animal trainer who trained the animals that had been featured in AFW's advertisements. The six charges alleged that Yost had illegally purchased and trafficked endangered animals. The animals in Yost's possession – which included Siberian tigers, lions, bears, wolves, and other animals – were transferred to the care of the Colorado Human Society. Some of those animals had previously appeared in AFW's commercials. Following the 2003 tiger attack on Siegfried & Roy's Roy Horn, there were new limitations on the use of exotic animals in the US. Jabs said in 2010 that these limitations had restricted AFW to using previous stock footage of tigers for new advertisements and that the exotic animals could be removed from AFW's commercials in the future.

A 1983 commercial for AFW featured the character E.T. from the 1982 movie E.T. the Extra-Terrestrial. The movie's director, Steven Spielberg, was on a skiing trip in Aspen, Colorado, when he saw the commercial. Neither Spielberg nor the owner of the character's rights, Universal Pictures, had given permission for E.T. to appear in the commercial. Jabs said he hoped that the matter was resolved when he wrote a letter to Universal explaining that he thought had permission, though a Universal spokesperson said that the company was investigating AFW for trademark infringement.
