= Tres Arroyos Partido =

Tres Arroyos Partido de Tres Arroyos
- Department

- location of in Buenos Aires Province
- Coordinates: 38°22′S 60°16′W
- Country: Argentina
- Established: 1884
- Founder: Dardo Rocha
- Seat: Tres Arroyos

Government
  - Intendant: Pablo Garate (UP)

Area
  - Total: 5,681 km^{2} (2,193 sq mi)

Population
  - Total: 57,244
  - Density: 10.08/km^{2} (26.10/sq mi)
- Demonym: arroyense
- Postal Code: B7500
- IFAM: BUE127
- Area Code: 02983
- Patron saint: ?
- Website: www.tresarroyos-net.com.ar

The partido of Tres Arroyos is a subdivision of the Province of Buenos Aires in Argentina. On the Atlantic coast of the province, it was created in 1882 by the provincial government when they divided the territory of Tres Arroyos into the partidos of Coronel Suárez, Tres Arroyos and Coronel Pringles.

It has a population of about 62,000 inhabitants in an area of 5,681 km^{2} (2,193 sq mi), and its capital city is Tres Arroyos, which is around 580 km (360 mi) from Buenos Aires.

== Settlements ==
- Barrow
- Claromecó
- Dunamar
- Copetonas
- Lin Calel
- Micaela Cascallares
- Orense
- Reta
- San Francisco De Bellocq
- San Mayol
- Tres Arroyos
- Villa Rodríguez

== Sport ==
Tres Arroyos is home of Huracán de Tres Arroyos Huracán de Tres Arroyos, a local institution with a professional football team that play in the third category of the Argentine football (Argentino A).

In 2004-2005 Huracán TA played in the First Division of Argentine football, in an historic event for a small country city club.
