= Coronel Pringles Partido =

Coronel Pringles Partido de Coronel Pringles
- Department
- location of Coronel Pringles Partido in Buenos Aires Province
- Coordinates: 38°00′S 61°01′W
- Country: Argentina
- Established: July 5, 1882
- Founder: Provincial law 1497
- Seat: Coronel Pringles

Government
  - Intendant: Lisandro Matzkin

Area
  - Total: 5,257 km^{2} (2,030 sq mi)

Population (Census INDEC 2001)
  - Total: 23,794
  - Density: 4.526/km^{2} (11.72/sq mi)
- Demonym: pringlense
- Postal Code: B7530
- IFAM: BUE031
- Area Code: +54 2922
- Website: www.coronelpringles.gov.ar

Coronel Pringles is a partido of the Province of Buenos Aires in Argentina. In the southern part of the province, it was founded on 10 July 1882 by the provincial government when they divided the territory of Tres Arroyos into the partidos of Coronel Suárez, Tres Arroyos, and Coronel Pringles.

The partido has a population of 23,794 (Census INDEC 2001) in an area of 5,257 km^{2} (2,030 sq mi), and its capital city is Coronel Pringles, which is 597 km (371 mi) from Buenos Aires.

== Settlements ==
- Coronel Pringles
- Coronel Falcón
- El Divisorio
- El pensamiento
- Indio Rico
- Krabbe
- Lartigau
- Las Mostazas
- Pillahuinco
- Reserva
- Stegmann
