= Tres Arroyos =

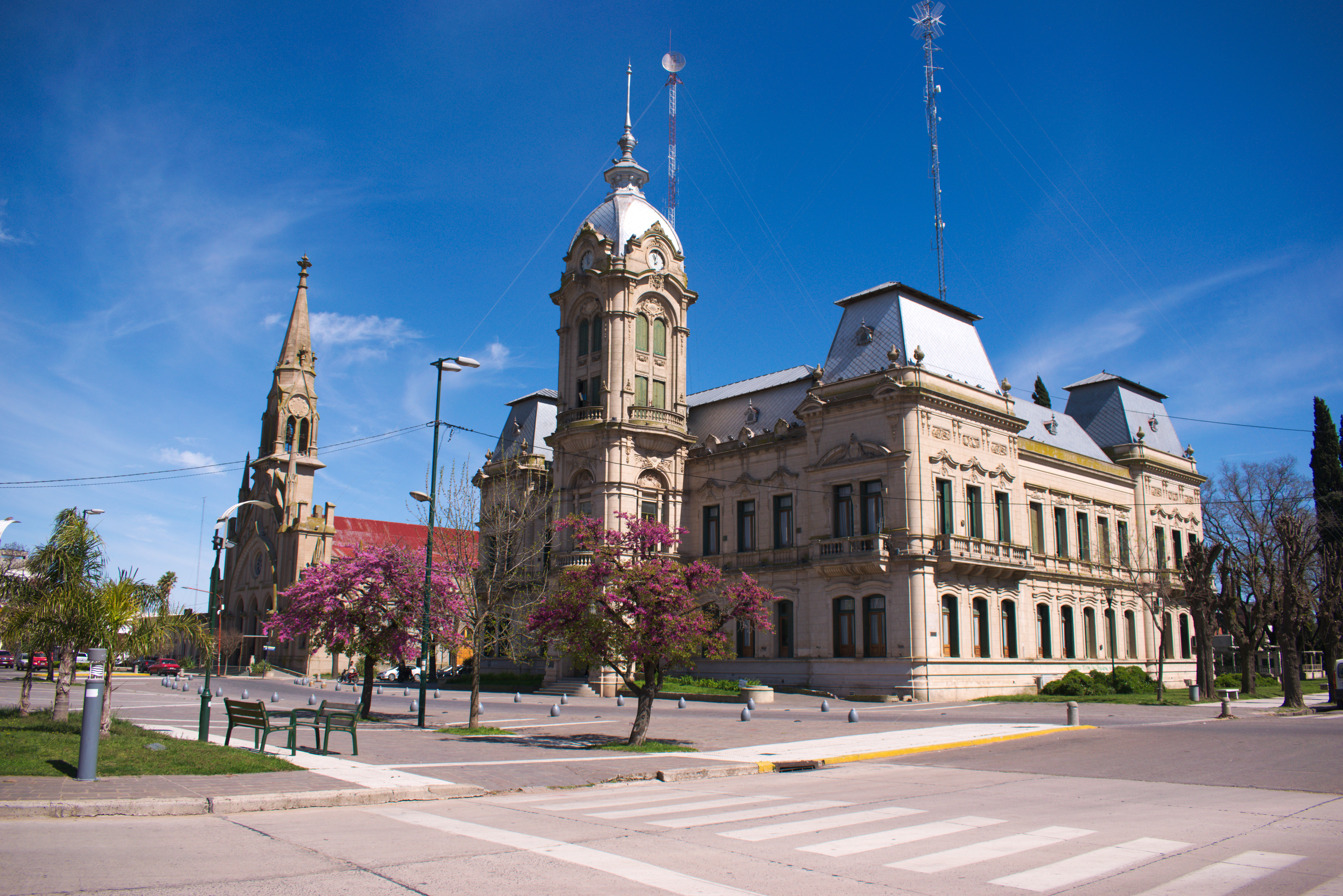
- The city center of Tres Arroyos

- Location in Argentina
- Coordinates: 38°22′S 60°16′W
- Country: Argentina
- Province: Buenos Aires
- Partido: Tres Arroyos
- Founded: April 24, 1884
- Elevation: 98 m (322 ft)

Population (2022 census)
  - Total: 62,835
- CPA Base: B 7500
- Area code: +54 2983
- Website: Official Website

Tres Arroyos is a city in Buenos Aires Province, Argentina. It is the administrative seat of Tres Arroyos Partido.

The city has a sizable population of Danish and Dutch descent.

Tres Arroyos is served by Tres Arroyos Airport.

== Climate ==
Tres Arroyos has an oceanic climate (Köppen climate classification Cfb) bordering on humid subtropical. Summers are warm while winters are mild with snowfall happening occasionally. Rainfall is fairly distributed (836mm per year), with winter being a slightly drier. Sunshine is moderate, with summer being sunnier, and averages to 2374 hours a year.

Climate data for Tres Arroyos (1991–2020, extremes 1961–present)
Month	Jan	Feb	Mar	Apr	May	Jun	Jul	Aug	Sep	Oct	Nov	Dec	Year
Record high °C (°F)	41.8 (107.2)	39.4 (102.9)	37.1 (98.8)	34.7 (94.5)	29.0 (84.2)	24.6 (76.3)	23.7 (74.7)	29.1 (84.4)	30.0 (86.0)	35.3 (95.5)	37.0 (98.6)	40.7 (105.3)	41.8 (107.2)
Mean daily maximum °C (°F)	29.4 (84.9)	27.9 (82.2)	25.4 (77.7)	20.9 (69.6)	16.8 (62.2)	13.5 (56.3)	12.7 (54.9)	15.2 (59.4)	17.3 (63.1)	20.3 (68.5)	24.1 (75.4)	28.0 (82.4)	21.0 (69.8)
Daily mean °C (°F)	21.8 (71.2)	20.5 (68.9)	18.4 (65.1)	14.2 (57.6)	10.9 (51.6)	8.1 (46.6)	7.1 (44.8)	8.9 (48.0)	10.8 (51.4)	13.8 (56.8)	17.1 (62.8)	20.3 (68.5)	14.3 (57.7)
Mean daily minimum °C (°F)	15.2 (59.4)	14.6 (58.3)	13.1 (55.6)	9.4 (48.9)	6.8 (44.2)	4.0 (39.2)	3.1 (37.6)	4.3 (39.7)	5.6 (42.1)	8.3 (46.9)	10.9 (51.6)	13.6 (56.5)	9.1 (48.4)
Record low °C (°F)	3.2 (37.8)	3.3 (37.9)	0.7 (33.3)	−1.6 (29.1)	−5.0 (23.0)	−7.6 (18.3)	−10.0 (14.0)	−7.0 (19.4)	−5.4 (22.3)	−3.3 (26.1)	−0.7 (30.7)	1.9 (35.4)	−10.0 (14.0)
Average precipitation mm (inches)	79.8 (3.14)	106.5 (4.19)	79.8 (3.14)	73.2 (2.88)	52.1 (2.05)	44.0 (1.73)	42.7 (1.68)	46.3 (1.82)	56.3 (2.22)	82.1 (3.23)	90.7 (3.57)	78.5 (3.09)	832.0 (32.76)
Average precipitation days (≥ 0.1 mm)	9.2	8.9	9.3	9.4	9.1	7.8	8.9	8.1	9.0	10.3	9.3	9.0	108.4
Average snowy days	0.0	0.0	0.0	0.0	0.1	0.1	0.3	0.2	0.1	0.0	0.0	0.0	0.8
Average relative humidity (%)	59.6	66.6	71.2	73.3	77.7	76.5	76.0	71.1	70.7	69.8	63.9	58.1	69.5
Mean monthly sunshine hours	284.1	240.7	215.1	176.6	136.6	118.4	123.6	144.4	168.2	206.4	250.7	275.2	2,373.6
Source 1: Servicio Meteorológico Nacional
Source 2: World Meteorological Organization (sunshine hours 1981–2010)

== Archaeological site ==
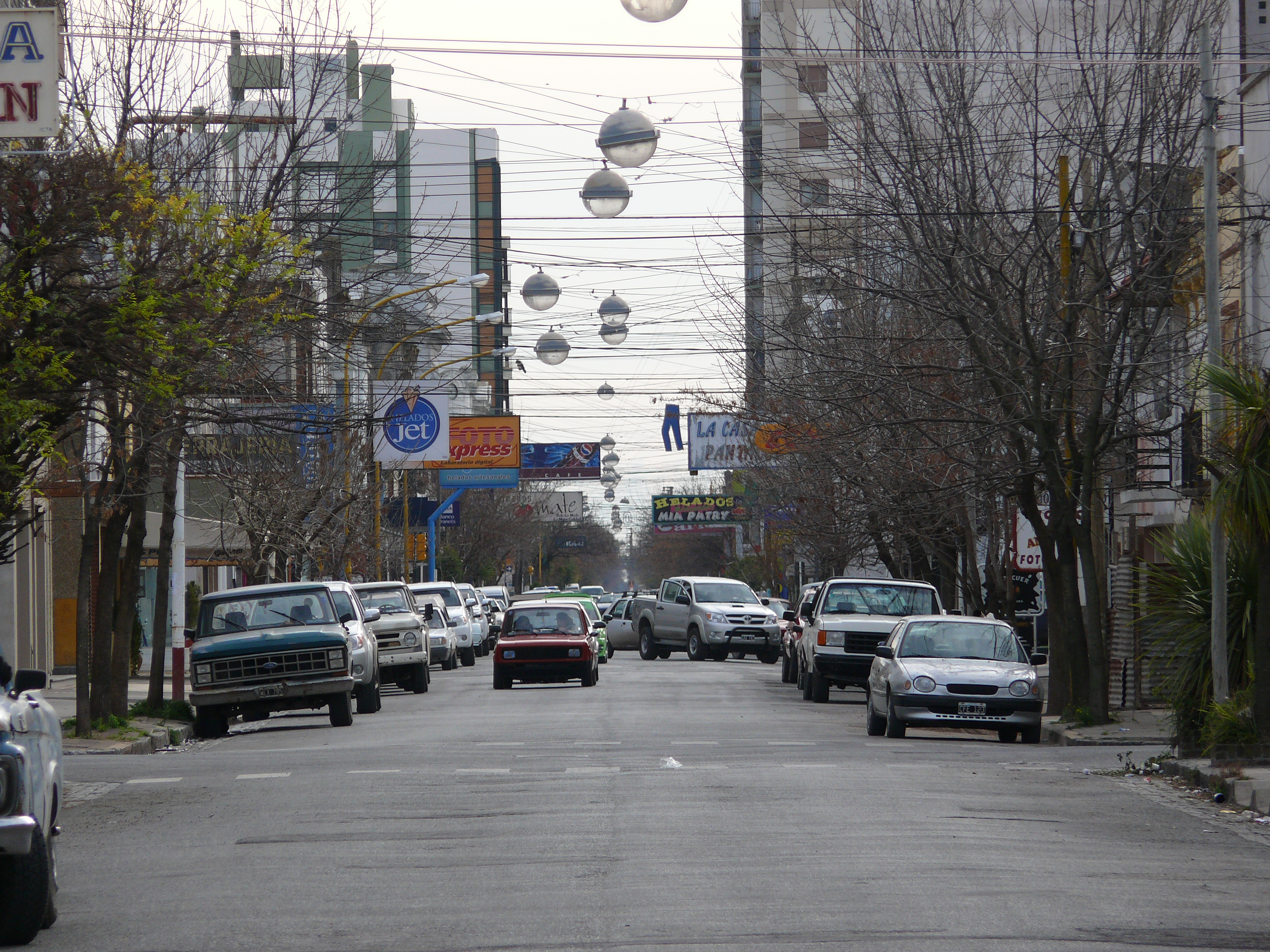
Colón Avenue

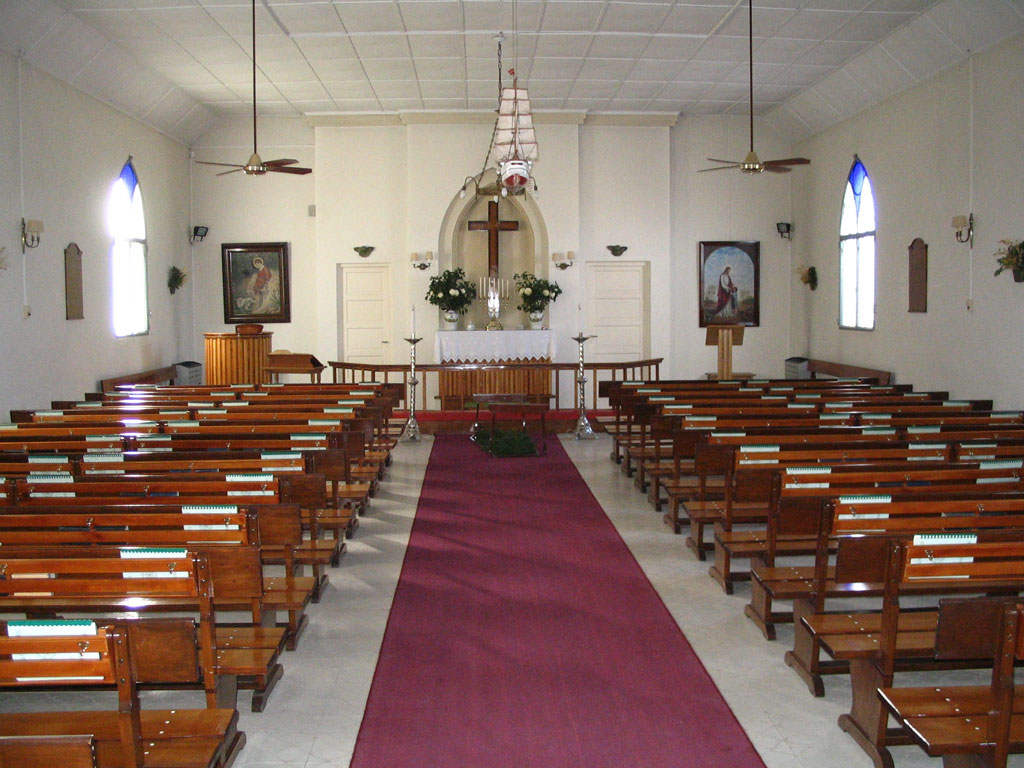
Danish Church

Roughly 5 km from the city of Tres Arroyos lies the "Arroyo Seco" archaeological site, which is considered to be one of the oldest yet found in Argentina. Over 40 skeletons, presumably in burial positions, were found at the site, dated to estimated age of 9000 years B.P. The site includes tools, hunting implements and fossils of extinct mammals. Much of the extensive materials are on display at the José A. Mulazzi Municipal Museum, which includes reconstructions of how the people of the time lived..

== Sport ==
The city is home to Huracán de Tres Arroyos, a football team playing in the regional leagues, but who played in the Argentine Primera as recently as 2004-05.
