= 2016 Copa Libertadores finals =

- Event: 2016 Copa Libertadores de América
Independiente del Valle	Atlético Nacional
(Ecuador)	(Colombia)
1	2
- on aggregate

First leg
Independiente del Valle	Atlético Nacional
1	1
- Date: 20 July 2016
- Venue: Estadio Olímpico Atahualpa, Quito
- Referee: Enrique Cáceres (Paraguay)
- Attendance: 38,500

Second leg
Atlético Nacional	Independiente del Valle
1	0
- Date: 27 July 2016
- Venue: Estadio Atanasio Girardot, Medellín
- Referee: Néstor Pitana (Argentina)
- Attendance: 46,000

The 2016 Copa Libertadores finals was the two-legged final that decided the winner of the 2016 Copa Libertadores de América, the 57th edition of the Copa Libertadores de América, South America's premier international club football tournament organized by CONMEBOL.

The finals were contested in two-legged home-and-away format between Ecuadorian team Independiente del Valle and Colombian team Atlético Nacional. As of 2025, this was the last Copa Libertadores finals not to feature a team from either Argentina or Brazil. The first leg was hosted by Independiente del Valle at Estadio Olímpico Atahualpa in Quito on 20 July 2016, while the second leg was hosted by Atlético Nacional at Estadio Atanasio Girardot in Medellín on 27 July 2016. The winner earned the right to represent CONMEBOL at the 2016 FIFA Club World Cup, entering at the semifinal stage, and also to play against the 2016 Copa Sudamericana winners in the 2017 Recopa Sudamericana. They also automatically qualified for the 2017 Copa Libertadores group stage.

Atlético Nacional defeated Independiente del Valle 2–1 on aggregate to win their second Copa Libertadores title.

== Teams ==
Team	Previous finals appearances (bold indicates winners)
(Ecuador) Independiente del Valle	None
(Colombia) Atlético Nacional	2 (**1989**, 1995)

These finals were the first ones without either an Argentine or a Brazilian team since the 1991 edition between Paraguayan team Olimpia and Chilean team Colo-Colo.

== Venues ==
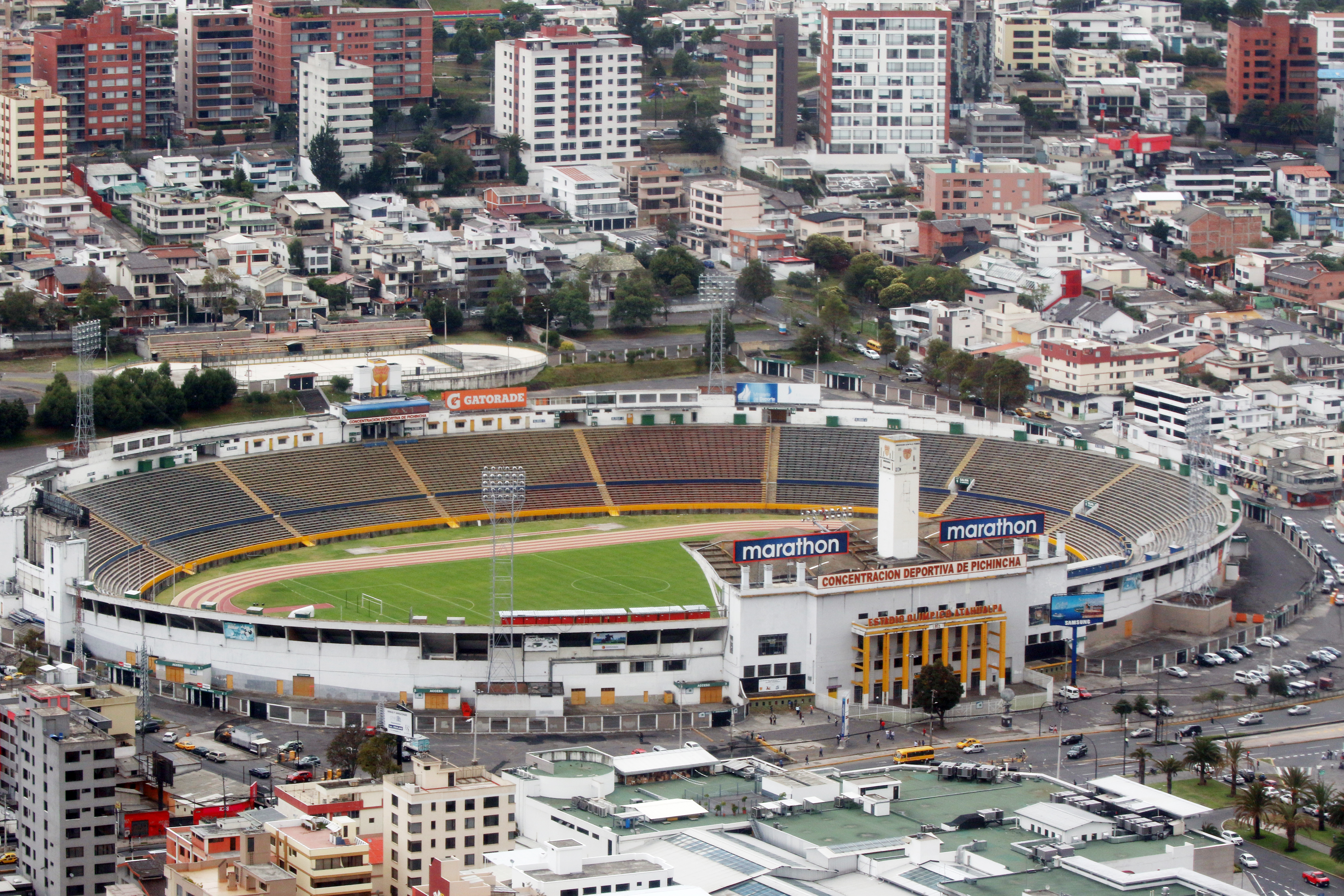
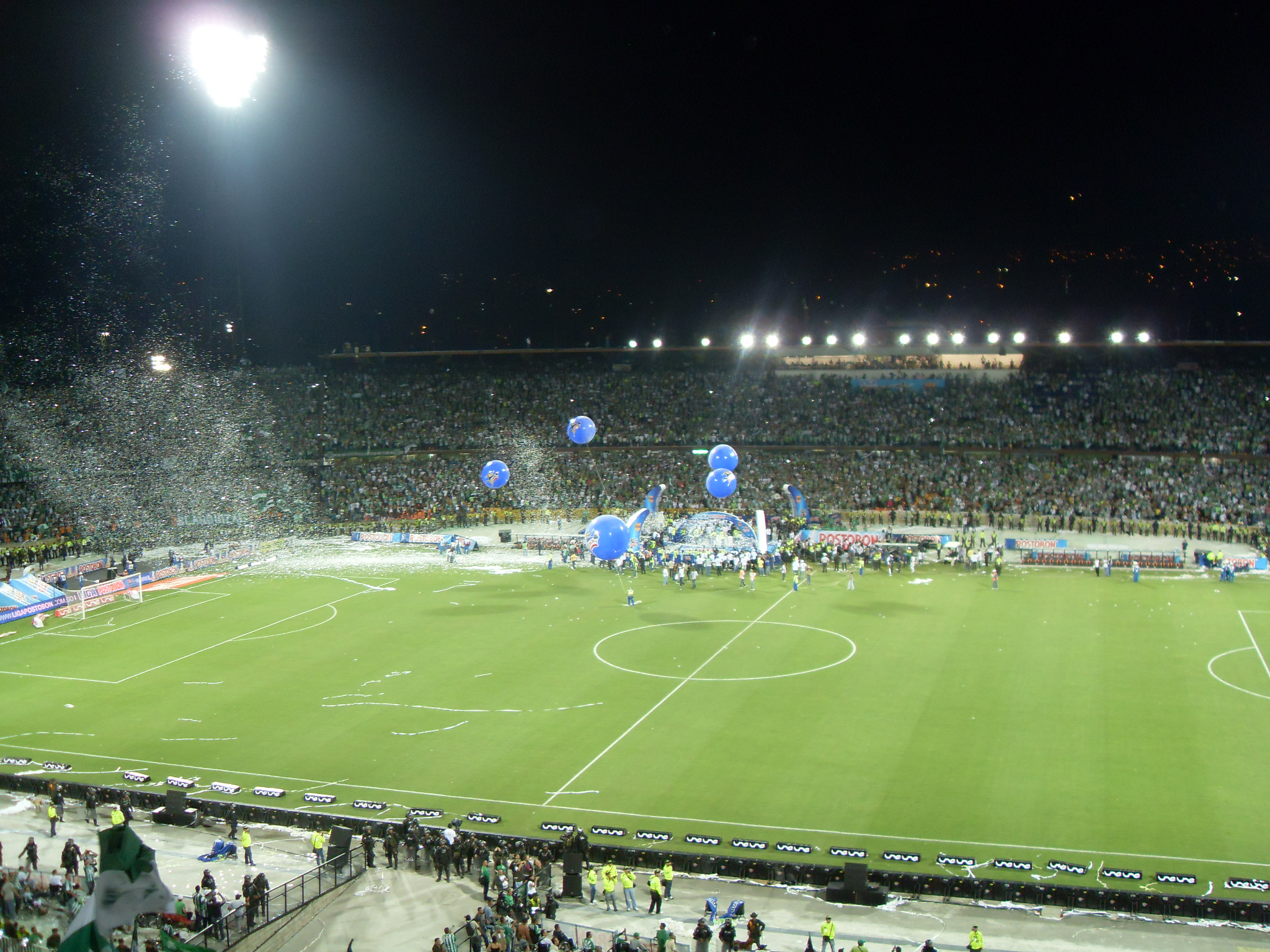
Estadio Olímpico Atahualpa (left) and Estadio Atanasio Girardot, venues for the series

== Road to the finals ==
Note: In all scores below, the score of the home team is given first.

(Ecuador) Independiente del Valle			Round	(Colombia) Atlético Nacional		
Opponent	Venue	Score		Opponent	Venue	Score
(Paraguay) Guaraní (tied 2–2 on aggregate, won on away goals)	Home	1–0	First stage	Bye		
(Paraguay) Guaraní (tied 2–2 on aggregate, won on away goals)	Away	2–1	First stage	Bye		
**Group 5**			Second stage	**Group 4**		
(Chile) Colo-Colo	Home	1–1	Second stage	(Argentina) Huracán	Away	0–2
(Brazil) Atlético Mineiro	Away	1–0	Second stage	(Peru) Sporting Cristal	Home	3–0
(Peru) Melgar	Away	0–1	Second stage	(Uruguay) Peñarol	Home	2–0
(Peru) Melgar	Home	2–0	Second stage	(Uruguay) Peñarol	Away	0–4
(Brazil) Atlético Mineiro	Home	3–2	Second stage	(Peru) Sporting Cristal	Away	0–1
(Chile) Colo-Colo	Away	0–0	Second stage	(Argentina) Huracán	Home	0–0
Pos / Team / Pld / Pts; 1 / (Brazil) Atlético Mineiro (A) / 6 / **13**; **2** / (Ecuador) Independiente del Valle (A) / **6** / **11**; 3 / (Chile) Colo-Colo / 6 / **9**; 4 / (Peru) Melgar / 6 / **0**; Source: CONMEBOL (A) Advanced to the round of 16			Second stage	Pos / Team / Pld / Pts; **1** / (Colombia) Atlético Nacional (A) / **6** / **16**; 2 / (Argentina) Huracán (A) / 6 / **8**; 3 / (Uruguay) Peñarol / 6 / **5**; 4 / (Peru) Sporting Cristal / 6 / **4**; Source: CONMEBOL (A) Advanced to the round of 16		
**Seed 10**			final stages	**Seed 1**		
(Argentina) River Plate (won 2–1 on aggregate)	Home	2–0	Round of 16	(Argentina) Huracán (won 4–2 on aggregate)	Away	0–0
(Argentina) River Plate (won 2–1 on aggregate)	Away	1–0	Round of 16	(Argentina) Huracán (won 4–2 on aggregate)	Home	4–2
(Mexico) UNAM (tied 3–3 on aggregate, won 5–3 on penalties)	Home	2–1	Quarterfinals	(Argentina) Rosario Central (won 3–2 on aggregate)	Away	1–0
(Mexico) UNAM (tied 3–3 on aggregate, won 5–3 on penalties)	Away	2–1	Quarterfinals	(Argentina) Rosario Central (won 3–2 on aggregate)	Home	3–1
(Argentina) Boca Juniors (won 5–3 on aggregate)	Home	2–1	Semifinals	(Brazil) São Paulo (won 4–1 on aggregate)	Away	0–2
(Argentina) Boca Juniors (won 5–3 on aggregate)	Away	2–3	Semifinals	(Brazil) São Paulo (won 4–1 on aggregate)	Home	2–1

== Format ==
The finals were played on a home-and-away two-legged basis, with the higher-seeded team hosting the second leg. If tied on aggregate, the away goals rule would not be used, and 30 minutes of extra time would be played. If still tied after extra time, the penalty shoot-out would be used to determine the winner.

== Matches ==
=== First leg ===
In the 35th minute, Orlando Berrío opened the scoring for Atlético Nacional with a low right foot shot from outside the penalty box to the right corner of the net. Arturo Mina got the equalizer for Independiente del Valle in the 86th minute when his header from a free-kick into the penalty box was saved but not cleared he hit the rebound low to the net.

20 July 2016
19:45 UTC−5

Independiente del Valle (Ecuador)	1–1	(Colombia) Atlético Nacional
Mina 86'	Report	Berrío 35'

Estadio Olímpico Atahualpa, Quito
Attendance: 38,500
Referee: Enrique Cáceres (Paraguay)

**Independiente del Valle**	**Atlético Nacional**

GK	1	(Ecuador) Daniel Azcona (c)
RB	20	(Uruguay) Christian Núñez	(yellow card) 43'
CB	3	(Ecuador) Arturo Mina
CB	4	(Ecuador) Luís Caicedo	(yellow card) 78'
LB	23	(Uruguay) Emiliano Tellechea
CM	15	(Uruguay) Mario Rizotto	(yellow card) 57'
CM	18	(Ecuador) Jefferson Orejuela
RW	17	(Ecuador) Julio Angulo		(substituted off) 69'
AM	10	(Ecuador) Junior Sornoza
LW	11	(Ecuador) Bryan Cabezas		(substituted off) 69'
CF	19	(Ecuador) José Enrique Angulo		(substituted off) 86'
Substitutes:
GK	22	(Ecuador) Javier Nazareno
DF	2	(Ecuador) Luis Fernando León
DF	6	(Ecuador) Luis Ayala
MF	16	(Ecuador) Jonathan Gonzáles		(substituted on) 69'
MF	27	(Ecuador) Dixon Arroyo
FW	7	(Ecuador) Jonny Uchuari		(substituted on) 69'
FW	25	(Ecuador) Miller Castillo		(substituted on) 86'
Manager:
(Uruguay) Pablo Repetto

GK	25	(Argentina) Franco Armani
RB	2	(Colombia) Daniel Bocanegra
CB	26	(Colombia) Davinson Sánchez	(yellow card) 79'
CB	12	(Colombia) Alexis Henríquez (c)
LB	19	(Colombia) Farid Díaz
CM	8	(Colombia) Diego Arias
CM	24	(Colombia) Sebastián Pérez	(yellow card) 19'	(substituted off) 75'
RW	28	(Colombia) Orlando Berrío
AM	10	(Colombia) Macnelly Torres		(substituted off) 79'
LW	29	(Colombia) Marlos Moreno		(substituted off) 88'
CF	23	(Colombia) Miguel Borja
Substitutes:
GK	26	(Colombia) Cristian Bonilla
DF	3	(Colombia) Felipe Aguilar
DF	6	(Colombia) Edwin Velasco
MF	11	(Colombia) Andrés Ibargüen		(substituted on) 88'
MF	14	(Colombia) Elkin Blanco		(substituted on) 79'
MF	18	(Venezuela) Alejandro Guerra	(yellow card) 90+3'	(substituted on) 75'
FW	4	(Argentina) Ezequiel Rescaldani
Manager:
(Colombia) Reinaldo Rueda

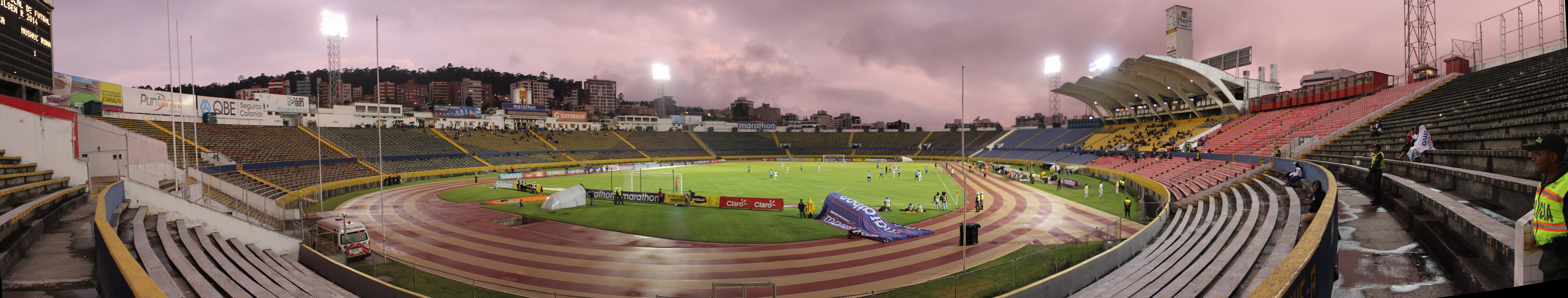
Estadio Olímpico Atahualpa in Quito, Ecuador, hosted the first leg.

Assistant referees:
Eduardo Cardozo (Paraguay)
Milcíades Saldívar (Paraguay)
Additional assistant referee:
Ulises Mereles (Paraguay)
José Méndez (Paraguay)
Fourth official:
Roberto Cañete (Paraguay)

=== Second leg ===
Miguel Borja got the only goal of the game in the 8th minute with a low right foot shot from twelve yards out after Macnelly Torres's chip into the box came back to him off the post.

27 July 2016
19:45 UTC−5

Atlético Nacional (Colombia)	1–0	(Ecuador) Independiente del Valle
Borja 8'	Report

Estadio Atanasio Girardot, Medellín
Attendance: 46,000
Referee: Néstor Pitana (Argentina)

**Atlético Nacional**	**Independiente del Valle**

GK	25	(Argentina) Franco Armani
RB	2	(Colombia) Daniel Bocanegra
CB	26	(Colombia) Davinson Sánchez
CB	12	(Colombia) Alexis Henríquez (c)
LB	19	(Colombia) Farid Díaz
CM	13	(Colombia) Alexander Mejía
CM	18	(Venezuela) Alejandro Guerra	(yellow card) 39'	(substituted off) 88'
RW	28	(Colombia) Orlando Berrío
AM	10	(Colombia) Macnelly Torres
LW	29	(Colombia) Marlos Moreno		(substituted off) 76'
CF	23	(Colombia) Miguel Borja	(yellow card) 73'	(substituted off) 80'
Substitutes:
GK	30	(Colombia) Luis Enrique Martínez
DF	5	(Colombia) Francisco Nájera
DF	6	(Colombia) Edwin Velasco
MF	8	(Colombia) Diego Arias		(substituted on) 88'
MF	11	(Colombia) Andrés Ibargüen		(substituted on) 76'
MF	22	(Colombia) Gilberto García
FW	4	(Argentina) Ezequiel Rescaldani	(yellow card) 90+2'	(substituted on) 80'
Manager:
(Colombia) Reinaldo Rueda

GK	1	(Ecuador) Daniel Azcona (c)
RB	20	(Uruguay) Christian Núñez
CB	3	(Ecuador) Arturo Mina
CB	4	(Ecuador) Luís Caicedo
LB	23	(Uruguay) Emiliano Tellechea		(substituted off) 87'
CM	18	(Ecuador) Jefferson Orejuela
CM	15	(Uruguay) Mario Rizotto	(yellow card) 28'
RW	17	(Ecuador) Julio Angulo		(substituted off) 71'
AM	10	(Ecuador) Junior Sornoza	(yellow card) 43'	(substituted off) 46'
LW	11	(Ecuador) Bryan Cabezas
CF	19	(Ecuador) José Enrique Angulo
Substitutes:
GK	22	(Ecuador) Javier Nazareno
DF	2	(Ecuador) Luis Fernando León
DF	6	(Ecuador) Luis Ayala
MF	16	(Ecuador) Jonathan Gonzáles		(substituted on) 71'
MF	27	(Ecuador) Dixon Arroyo
FW	7	(Ecuador) Jonny Uchuari		(substituted on) 46'
FW	25	(Ecuador) Miller Castillo		(substituted on) 87'
Manager:
(Uruguay) Pablo Repetto

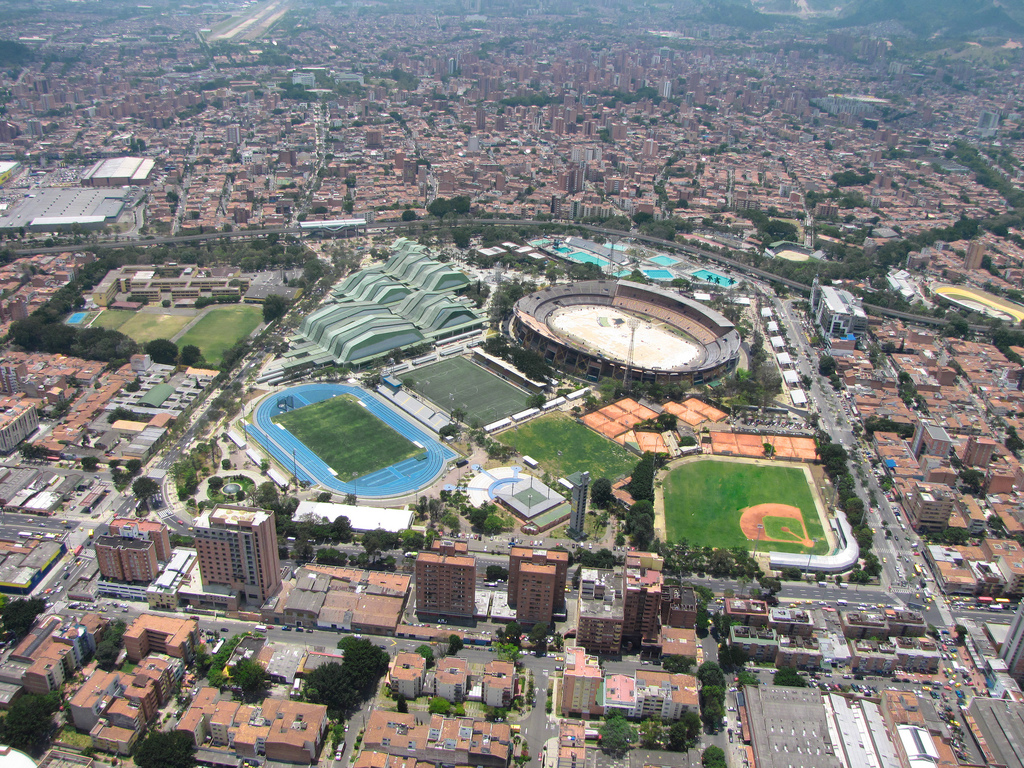
Estadio Atanasio Girardot in Medellín, Colombia, hosted the second leg.

Assistant referees:
Ezequiel Brailovsky (Argentina)
Ariel Scime (Argentina)
Additional assistant referee:
Darío Herrera (Argentina)
Germán Delfino (Argentina)
Fourth official:
Iván Núñez (Argentina)
