= 2016 Copa Libertadores final stages =

The 2016 Copa Libertadores final stages were played from 26 April to 27 July 2016. A total of 16 teams competed in the final stages to decide the champions of the 2016 Copa Libertadores. Atlético Nacional won the title by defeating Independiente del Valle in the finals.

== Qualified teams ==
The winners and runners-up of each of the eight groups in the second stage qualified for the final stages.

Group	Winners	Runners-up
1	(Argentina) River Plate	(Brazil) São Paulo
2	(Argentina) Rosario Central	(Uruguay) Nacional
3	(Argentina) Boca Juniors	(Argentina) Racing
4	(Colombia) Atlético Nacional	(Argentina) Huracán
5	(Brazil) Atlético Mineiro	(Ecuador) Independiente del Valle
6	(Mexico) Toluca	(Brazil) Grêmio
7	(Mexico) Pumas UNAM	(Venezuela) Deportivo Táchira
8	(Brazil) Corinthians	(Paraguay) Cerro Porteño

== Seeding ==
The qualified teams were seeded in the final stages according to their results in the second stage, with the group winners seeded 1–8, and the group runners-up seeded 9–16.

Seed	Grp	Team	Pld	W	D	L	GF	GA	GD	Pts	Round of 16
1	4	(Colombia) Atlético Nacional	6	5	1	0	12	0	+12	16	Match A
2	7	(Mexico) Pumas UNAM	6	5	0	1	17	8	+9	15	Match B
3	8	(Brazil) Corinthians	6	4	1	1	13	4	+9	13	Match C
4	5	(Brazil) Atlético Mineiro	6	4	1	1	12	4	+8	13	Match D
5	6	(Mexico) Toluca	6	4	1	1	9	5	+4	13	Match E
6	3	(Argentina) Boca Juniors	6	3	3	0	11	4	+7	12	Match F
7	1	(Argentina) River Plate	6	3	2	1	17	7	+10	11	Match G
8	2	(Argentina) Rosario Central	6	3	2	1	13	8	+5	11	Match H
9	6	(Brazil) Grêmio	6	3	2	1	10	6	+4	11	Match H
10	5	(Ecuador) Independiente del Valle	6	3	2	1	7	4	+3	11	Match G
11	8	(Paraguay) Cerro Porteño	6	3	1	2	6	7	−1	10	Match F
12	1	(Brazil) São Paulo	6	2	3	1	11	5	+6	9	Match E
13	3	(Argentina) Racing	6	2	3	1	11	7	+4	9	Match D
14	2	(Uruguay) Nacional	6	2	3	1	6	6	0	9	Match C
15	7	(Venezuela) Deportivo Táchira	6	3	0	3	6	11	−5	9	Match B
16	4	(Argentina) Huracán	6	2	2	2	7	7	0	8	Match A

Source: CONMEBOL
Rules for classification: 1) Higher position in group; 2) Points; 3) Goal difference; 4) Goals scored; 5) Away goals scored; 6) Drawing of lots (Regulations Article 3.3h).

== Format ==
In the final stages, the 16 teams played a single-elimination tournament, with the following rules:

- Each tie was played on a home-and-away two-legged basis, with the higher-seeded team hosting the second leg (Regulations Article 3.4). However, CONMEBOL required that the second leg of the finals had to be played in South America, i.e., if there was a finalist from Mexico, they would have to host the first leg regardless of seeding (Regulations Article 3.7b).
- In the round of 16, quarterfinals, and semifinals, if tied on aggregate, the away goals rule would be used. If still tied, extra time would not be played, and the penalty shoot-out would be used to determine the winner (Regulations Article 5.2).
- In the finals, if tied on aggregate, the away goals rule would not be used, and 30 minutes of extra time would be played. If still tied after extra time, the penalty shoot-out would be used to determine the winner (Regulations Article 5.3).
- If there were two semifinalists from the same association, they would have to play each other (Regulations Article 3.6).

== Bracket ==
The bracket of the final stages was determined by the seeding as follows:

- Round of 16:
  - Match A: Seed 1 vs. Seed 16
  - Match B: Seed 2 vs. Seed 15
  - Match C: Seed 3 vs. Seed 14
  - Match D: Seed 4 vs. Seed 13
  - Match E: Seed 5 vs. Seed 12
  - Match F: Seed 6 vs. Seed 11
  - Match G: Seed 7 vs. Seed 10
  - Match H: Seed 8 vs. Seed 9
- Quarterfinals:
  - Match S1: Winner A vs. Winner H
  - Match S2: Winner B vs. Winner G
  - Match S3: Winner C vs. Winner F
  - Match S4: Winner D vs. Winner E
- Semifinals: (if there were two semifinalists from the same association, they would have to play each other)
  - Match F1: Winner S1 vs. Winner S4
  - Match F2: Winner S2 vs. Winner S3
- Finals: Winner F1 vs. Winner F2

Round of 16
10	(Ecuador) Independiente del Valle	2	0	2
7	(Argentina) River Plate	0	1	1
15	(Venezuela) Deportivo Táchira	1	0	1
2	(Mexico) Pumas UNAM	0	2	2
14	(Uruguay) Nacional (a)	0	2	2
3	(Brazil) Corinthians	0	2	2
11	(Paraguay) Cerro Porteño	1	1	2
6	(Argentina) Boca Juniors	2	3	5
12	(Brazil) São Paulo	4	1	5
5	(Mexico) Toluca	0	3	3
13	(Argentina) Racing	0	1	1
4	(Brazil) Atlético Mineiro	0	2	2
9	(Brazil) Grêmio	0	0	0
8	(Argentina) Rosario Central	1	3	4
16	(Argentina) Huracán	0	2	2
1	(Colombia) Atlético Nacional	0	4	4

Quarterfinals
10	(Ecuador) Independiente del Valle (p)	2	1	3 (5)
2	(Mexico) Pumas UNAM	1	2	3 (3)
14	(Uruguay) Nacional	1	1	2 (3)
6	(Argentina) Boca Juniors (p)	1	1	2 (4)
12	(Brazil) São Paulo (a)	1	1	2
4	(Brazil) Atlético Mineiro	0	2	2
8	(Argentina) Rosario Central	1	1	2
1	(Colombia) Atlético Nacional	0	3	3

Semifinals
10	(Ecuador) Independiente del Valle	2	3	5
6	(Argentina) Boca Juniors	1	2	3
12	(Brazil) São Paulo	0	1	1
1	(Colombia) Atlético Nacional	2	2	4

Finals
10	(Ecuador) Independiente del Valle	1	0	1
1	(Colombia) Atlético Nacional	1	1	2

== Round of 16 ==
The first legs were played on 26–28 April, and the second legs were played on 3–5 May 2016.

Team 1	Agg.	Team 2	1st leg	2nd leg
Huracán (Argentina)	2–4	(Colombia) Atlético Nacional	0–0	2–4
Deportivo Táchira (Venezuela)	1–2	(Mexico) Pumas UNAM	1–0	0–2
Nacional (Uruguay)	2–2 (a)	(Brazil) Corinthians	0–0	2–2
Racing (Argentina)	1–2	(Brazil) Atlético Mineiro	0–0	1–2
São Paulo (Brazil)	5–3	(Mexico) Toluca	4–0	1–3
Cerro Porteño (Paraguay)	2–5	(Argentina) Boca Juniors	1–2	1–3
Independiente del Valle (Ecuador)	2–1	(Argentina) River Plate	2–0	0–1
Grêmio (Brazil)	0–4	(Argentina) Rosario Central	0–1	0–3

=== Match A ===
26 April 2016
19:30 UTC−3

Huracán (Argentina)	0–0	(Colombia) Atlético Nacional
	Report

Estadio Tomás Adolfo Ducó, Buenos Aires
Attendance: 20,000
Referee: Patricio Polic (Chile)

3 May 2016
19:45 UTC−5

Atlético Nacional (Colombia)	4–2	(Argentina) Huracán
Ibarbo 23' (pen.); Guerra 57', 67'; Copete 90+2'	Report	Espinoza 25'; Ábila 76'

Estadio Atanasio Girardot, Medellín
Attendance: 40,000
Referee: José Argote (Venezuela)

Atlético Nacional won 4–2 on aggregate and advanced to the quarterfinals (Match S1).

=== Match B ===
26 April 2016
20:15 UTC−4:30

Deportivo Táchira (Venezuela)	1–0	(Mexico) Pumas UNAM
Mosquera 50'	Report

Estadio Polideportivo de Pueblo Nuevo, San Cristóbal
Attendance: 25,000
Referee: Oscar Maldonado (Bolivia)

3 May 2016
21:45 UTC−5

Pumas UNAM (Mexico)	2–0	(Venezuela) Deportivo Táchira
Ed. Herrera 12'; I. Sosa 80'	Report

Estadio Olímpico Universitario, Mexico City
Attendance: 25,000
Referee: Patricio Polic (Chile)

Pumas UNAM won 2–1 on aggregate and advanced to the quarterfinals (Match S2).

=== Match C ===
27 April 2016
21:45 UTC−3

Nacional (Uruguay)	0–0	(Brazil) Corinthians
	Report

Gran Parque Central, Montevideo
Attendance: 26,000
Referee: Patricio Loustau (Argentina)

4 May 2016
21:45 UTC−3

Corinthians (Brazil)	2–2	(Uruguay) Nacional
Lucca 14'; Marquinhos Gabriel 90+3' (pen.)	Report	N. López 4'; S. Romero 56'

Arena Corinthians, São Paulo
Attendance: 43,098
Referee: Néstor Pitana (Argentina)

Tied 2–2 on aggregate, Nacional won on away goals and advanced to the quarterfinals (Match S3).

=== Match D ===
27 April 2016
19:30 UTC−3

Racing (Argentina)	0–0	(Brazil) Atlético Mineiro
	Report

Estadio Presidente Juan Domingo Perón, Avellaneda
Attendance: 28,000
Referee: Julio Quintana (Paraguay)

4 May 2016
21:45 UTC−3

Atlético Mineiro (Brazil)	2–1	(Argentina) Racing
Carlos 15'; Pratto 71'	Report	López 21' (pen.)

Estádio Independência, Belo Horizonte
Attendance: 20,170
Referee: Daniel Fedorczuk (Uruguay)

Atlético Mineiro won 2–1 on aggregate and advanced to the quarterfinals (Match S4).

=== Match E ===
28 April 2016
21:45 UTC−3

São Paulo (Brazil)	4–0	(Mexico) Toluca
Michel Bastos 26'; Centurión 44', 60'; Thiago Mendes 52'	Report

Estádio do Morumbi, São Paulo
Attendance: 53,241
Referee: Jonhatan Fuentes (Uruguay)

4 May 2016
17:15 UTC−5

Toluca (Mexico)	3–1	(Brazil) São Paulo
Uribe 17', 86'; Triverio 60'	Report	Michel Bastos 50'

Estadio Nemesio Díez, Toluca
Attendance: 10,000
Referee: Wilson Lamouroux (Colombia)

São Paulo won 5–3 on aggregate and advanced to the quarterfinals (Match S4).

=== Match F ===
28 April 2016
20:45 UTC−4

Cerro Porteño (Paraguay)	1–2	(Argentina) Boca Juniors
Domínguez 83' (pen.)	Report	Tévez 28'; Lodeiro 59'

Estadio Defensores del Chaco, Asunción
Attendance: 25,000
Referee: Francisco Chacón (Mexico)

5 May 2016
21:45 UTC−3

Boca Juniors (Argentina)	3–1	(Paraguay) Cerro Porteño
Tévez 3' (pen.); Pavón 72'; Pérez 88'	Report	R. Rojas 12'

Estadio Alberto J. Armando, Buenos Aires
Attendance: 50,000
Referee: Wilton Sampaio (Brazil)

Boca Juniors won 5–2 on aggregate and advanced to the quarterfinals (Match S3).

=== Match G ===
28 April 2016
17:30 UTC−5

Independiente del Valle (Ecuador)	2–0	(Argentina) River Plate
Jo. Angulo 63'; Sornoza 90+1' (pen.)	Report

Estadio Olímpico Atahualpa, Quito
Attendance: 35,000
Referee: Héber Lopes (Brazil)

4 May 2016
19:15 UTC−3

River Plate (Argentina)	1–0	(Ecuador) Independiente del Valle
Caicedo 78' (o.g.)	Report

Estadio Antonio Vespucio Liberti, Buenos Aires
Attendance: 55,000
Referee: Wilmar Roldán (Colombia)

Independiente del Valle won 2–1 on aggregate and advanced to the quarterfinals (Match S2).

=== Match H ===
27 April 2016
21:45 UTC−3

Grêmio (Brazil)	0–1	(Argentina) Rosario Central
	Report	Ruben 13'

Arena do Grêmio, Porto Alegre
Attendance: 34,621
Referee: Víctor Carrillo (Peru)

5 May 2016
19:15 UTC−3

Rosario Central (Argentina)	3–0	(Brazil) Grêmio
Ruben 4', 23' (pen.); Donatti 56'	Report

Estadio Gigante de Arroyito, Rosario
Attendance: 35,000
Referee: Enrique Cáceres (Paraguay)

Rosario Central won 4–0 on aggregate and advanced to the quarterfinals (Match S1).

== Quarterfinals ==
The first legs were played on 11–12 and 17 May, and the second legs were played on 18–19 and 24 May 2016.

Team 1	Agg.	Team 2	1st leg	2nd leg
Rosario Central (Argentina)	2–3	(Colombia) Atlético Nacional	1–0	1–3
Independiente del Valle (Ecuador)	3–3 (5–3 p)	(Mexico) Pumas UNAM	2–1	1–2
Nacional (Uruguay)	2–2 (3–4 p)	(Argentina) Boca Juniors	1–1	1–1
São Paulo (Brazil)	2–2 (a)	(Brazil) Atlético Mineiro	1–0	1–2

=== Match S1 ===
12 May 2016
21:45 UTC−3

Rosario Central (Argentina)	1–0	(Colombia) Atlético Nacional
Montoya 5'	Report

Estadio Gigante de Arroyito, Rosario
Attendance: 39,000
Referee: Sandro Ricci (Brazil)

19 May 2016
20:45 UTC−5

Atlético Nacional (Colombia)	3–1	(Argentina) Rosario Central
Torres 45+1'; Guerra 50'; Berrío 90+4'	Report	Ruben 8' (pen.)

Estadio Atanasio Girardot, Medellín
Attendance: 44,591
Referee: Daniel Fedorczuk (Uruguay)

Atlético Nacional won 3–2 on aggregate and advanced to the semifinals (Match F1).

=== Match S2 ===
17 May 2016
19:45 UTC−5

Independiente del Valle (Ecuador)	2–1	(Mexico) Pumas UNAM
Jo. Angulo 41', 54'	Report	F. Martínez 72'

Estadio Olímpico Atahualpa, Quito
Attendance: 35,000
Referee: Mauro Vigliano (Argentina)

24 May 2016
19:45 UTC−5

Pumas UNAM (Mexico)	2–1	(Ecuador) Independiente del Valle
I. Sosa 15', 17'	Report	Sornoza 65'
Penalties
Ed. Herrera (penalty scored); Ludueña (penalty scored); I. Sosa (penalty missed); H. Ruíz (penalty scored)	3–5	(penalty scored) Cortez; (penalty scored) Tellechea; (penalty scored) Jo. Angulo; (penalty scored) Caicedo; (penalty scored) Mina

Estadio Olímpico Universitario, Mexico City
Attendance: 45,000
Referee: Víctor Carrillo (Peru)

Tied 3–3 on aggregate, Independiente del Valle won on penalties and advanced to the semifinals (Match F2).

=== Match S3 ===
12 May 2016
19:30 UTC−3

Nacional (Uruguay)	1–1	(Argentina) Boca Juniors
Fernández 75'	Report	Fabra 69'

Gran Parque Central, Montevideo
Attendance: 30,000
Referee: Enrique Cáceres (Paraguay)

19 May 2016
20:15 UTC−3

Boca Juniors (Argentina)	1–1	(Uruguay) Nacional
Pavón 72'	Report	Díaz 20' (o.g.)
Penalties
Tévez (penalty scored); Díaz (penalty scored); Pérez (penalty missed); Insaurralde (penalty missed); Fabra (penalty scored); Carrizo (penalty scored)	4–3	(penalty scored) Polenta; (penalty scored) Victorino; (penalty scored) Fernández; (penalty missed) Porras; (penalty missed) S. Romero; (penalty missed) Carballo

Estadio Alberto J. Armando, Buenos Aires
Attendance: 43,000
Referee: Héber Lopes (Brazil)

Tied 2–2 on aggregate, Boca Juniors won on penalties and advanced to the semifinals (Match F2).

=== Match S4 ===
11 May 2016
21:45 UTC−3

São Paulo (Brazil)	1–0	(Brazil) Atlético Mineiro
Michel Bastos 78'	Report

Estádio do Morumbi, São Paulo
Attendance: 61,297
Referee: Wilmar Roldán (Colombia)

18 May 2016
21:45 UTC−3

Atlético Mineiro (Brazil)	2–1	(Brazil) São Paulo
Cazares 6'; Carlos 11'	Report	Maicon 14'

Estádio Independência, Belo Horizonte
Attendance: 21,337
Referee: Andrés Cunha (Uruguay)

Tied 2–2 on aggregate, São Paulo won on away goals and advanced to the semifinals (Match F1).

== Semifinals ==
The first legs were played on 6–7 July, and the second legs were played on 13–14 July 2016.

Team 1	Agg.	Team 2	1st leg	2nd leg
São Paulo (Brazil)	1–4	(Colombia) Atlético Nacional	0–2	1–2
Independiente del Valle (Ecuador)	5–3	(Argentina) Boca Juniors	2–1	3–2

=== Match F1 ===
6 July 2016
21:45 UTC−3

São Paulo (Brazil)	0–2	(Colombia) Atlético Nacional
	Report	Borja 81', 88'

Estádio do Morumbi, São Paulo
Attendance: 67,052
Referee: Mauro Vigliano (Argentina)

13 July 2016
19:45 UTC−5

Atlético Nacional (Colombia)	2–1	(Brazil) São Paulo
Borja 15', 77' (pen.)	Report	Calleri 8'

Estadio Atanasio Girardot, Medellín
Attendance: 44,739
Referee: Patricio Polic (Chile)

Atlético Nacional won 4–1 on aggregate and advanced to the finals.

=== Match F2 ===
7 July 2016
19:45 UTC−5

Independiente del Valle (Ecuador)	2–1	(Argentina) Boca Juniors
B. Cabezas 61'; Jo. Angulo 75'	Report	Pérez 12'

Estadio Olímpico Atahualpa, Quito
Attendance: 35,258
Referee: Wilmar Roldán (Colombia)

14 July 2016
21:45 UTC−3

Boca Juniors (Argentina)	2–3	(Ecuador) Independiente del Valle
Pavón 3', 90'	Report	Caicedo 24'; B. Cabezas 48'; Ju. Angulo 50'

Estadio Alberto J. Armando, Buenos Aires
Referee: Daniel Fedorczuk (Uruguay)

Independiente del Valle won 5–3 on aggregate and advanced to the finals.

== Finals ==
The finals were played on a home-and-away two-legged basis, with the higher-seeded team hosting the second leg. If tied on aggregate, the away goals rule would not be used, and 30 minutes of extra time would be played. If still tied after extra time, the penalty shoot-out would be used to determine the winner.

The first leg was played on 20 July, and the second leg was played on 27 July 2016.

Team 1	Agg.	Team 2	1st leg	2nd leg
Independiente del Valle (Ecuador)	1–2	(Colombia) Atlético Nacional	1–1	0–1

20 July 2016
19:45 UTC−5

Independiente del Valle (Ecuador)	1–1	(Colombia) Atlético Nacional
Mina 86'	Report	Berrío 35'

Estadio Olímpico Atahualpa, Quito
Attendance: 38,500
Referee: Enrique Cáceres (Paraguay)

27 July 2016
19:45 UTC−5

Atlético Nacional (Colombia)	1–0	(Ecuador) Independiente del Valle
Borja 8'	Report

Estadio Atanasio Girardot, Medellín
Attendance: 46,000
Referee: Néstor Pitana (Argentina)

Atlético Nacional won 2–1 on aggregate.
