= 2016 Copa Libertadores first stage =

The 2016 Copa Libertadores first stage was played from 2 to 11 February 2016. A total of 12 teams competed in the first stage to decide six of the 32 places in the second stage of the 2016 Copa Libertadores.

== Draw ==
The draw of the tournament was held on 22 December 2015, 20:30 PYST (UTC−3), at the CONMEBOL Convention Centre in Luque, Paraguay.

Starting from this season, teams were seeded by the newly established CONMEBOL ranking of the Copa Libertadores (except for teams from Mexico which were not ranked and thus seeded last in all draws), taking into account of the following three factors:

1. Performance in the last 10 years, taking into account Copa Libertadores results in the period 2006–2015
2. Historical coefficient, taking into account Copa Libertadores results in the period 1960–2005
3. Local tournament champion, with bonus points awarded to domestic league champions of the last 10 years

For the first stage, the 12 teams were drawn into six ties containing a team from Pot A and a team from Pot B, with the former hosting the second leg. The teams were seeded based on their CONMEBOL ranking (shown in parentheses). Teams from the same association could not be drawn into the same tie.

Pots for the first stage draw
Pot A	Pot B
(Brazil) São Paulo (11); Universidad de Chile (17); (Colombia) Santa Fe (22); (Paraguay) Guaraní (29); (Argentina) Racing (39); (Venezuela) Caracas (43)	(Bolivia) Oriente Petrolero (64); (Argentina) Huracán (72); (Ecuador) Independiente del Valle (78); (Peru) Universidad César Vallejo (152); (Uruguay) River Plate (no rank); (Mexico) Puebla (no rank)

== Format ==
In the first stage, each tie was played on a home-and-away two-legged basis. If tied on aggregate, the away goals rule would be used. If still tied, extra time would not be played, and the penalty shoot-out would be used to determine the winner (Regulations Article 5.2). The six winners of the first stage advanced to the second stage to join the 26 direct entrants.

== Matches ==
The first legs were played on 2–4 February, and the second legs were played on 9–11 February 2016.

Team 1	Agg.	Team 2	1st leg	2nd leg
Oriente Petrolero (Bolivia)	1–6	(Colombia) Santa Fe	1–3	0–3
Huracán (Argentina)	2–2 (a)	(Venezuela) Caracas	1–0	1–2
Puebla (Mexico)	2–3	(Argentina) Racing	2–2	0–1
River Plate (Uruguay)	2–0	Universidad de Chile	2–0	0–0
Independiente del Valle (Ecuador)	2–2 (a)	(Paraguay) Guaraní	1–0	1–2
Universidad César Vallejo (Peru)	1–2	(Brazil) São Paulo	1–1	0–1

=== Match G1 ===
4 February 2016
20:45 UTC−4

Oriente Petrolero (Bolivia)	1–3	(Colombia) Santa Fe
Castillo 77'	Report	Ibargüen 22', 40'; Mina 54'

Estadio Ramón Tahuichi Aguilera, Santa Cruz
Referee: Péricles Cortez (Brazil)

11 February 2016
20:00 UTC−5

Santa Fe (Colombia)	3–0	(Bolivia) Oriente Petrolero
Mina 32', 38'; Otero 73'	Report

Estadio El Campín, Bogotá
Referee: Víctor Carrillo (Peru)

Santa Fe won 6–1 on aggregate and advanced to the second stage (Group 8).

=== Match G2 ===
2 February 2016
19:30 UTC−3

Huracán (Argentina)	1–0	(Venezuela) Caracas
González 74'	Report

Estadio Tomás Adolfo Ducó, Buenos Aires
Referee: Patricio Polic (Chile)

9 February 2016
20:15 UTC−4:30

Caracas (Venezuela)	2–1	(Argentina) Huracán
Quijada 45'; Arango 82'	Report	Mendoza 90+1'

Estadio Olímpico de la UCV, Caracas
Referee: Enrique Cáceres (Paraguay)

Tied 2–2 on aggregate, Huracán won on away goals and advanced to the second stage (Group 4).

=== Match G3 ===
3 February 2016
20:15 UTC−6

Puebla (Mexico)	2–2	(Argentina) Racing
Alustiza 2', 53' (pen.)	Report	Bou 13'; Noir 73'

Estadio Cuauhtémoc, Puebla
Referee: Daniel Fedorczuk (Uruguay)

10 February 2016
21:45 UTC−3

Racing (Argentina)	1–0	(Mexico) Puebla
Bou 74'	Report

Estadio Presidente Juan Domingo Perón, Avellaneda
Referee: Ricardo Marques (Brazil)

Racing won 3–2 on aggregate and advanced to the second stage (Group 3).

=== Match G4 ===
2 February 2016
21:45 UTC−3

River Plate (Uruguay)	2–0	Universidad de Chile
Santos 61' (pen.); Herrera 71' (o.g.)	Report

Estadio Domingo Burgueño, Maldonado
Referee: Patricio Loustau (Argentina)

9 February 2016
19:30 UTC−3

Universidad de Chile	0–0	(Uruguay) River Plate
	Report

Estadio Nacional, Santiago
Referee: Carlos Vera (Ecuador)

River Plate won 2–0 on aggregate and advanced to the second stage (Group 2).

=== Match G5 ===
4 February 2016
17:30 UTC−5

Independiente del Valle (Ecuador)	1–0	(Paraguay) Guaraní
Caicedo 28'	Report

Estadio Rumiñahui, Sangolquí
Referee: Juan Soto (Venezuela)

11 February 2016
19:30 UTC−3

Guaraní (Paraguay)	2–1	(Ecuador) Independiente del Valle
Palau 61'; López 80'	Report	Jo. Angulo 76'

Estadio Defensores del Chaco, Asunción
Referee: Mauro Vigliano (Argentina)

Tied 2–2 on aggregate, Independiente del Valle won on away goals and advanced to the second stage (Group 5).

=== Match G6 ===
3 February 2016
18:45 UTC−5

Universidad César Vallejo (Peru)	1–1	(Brazil) São Paulo
Hohberg 19'	Report	Calleri 65'

Estadio Mansiche, Trujillo
Referee: Roddy Zambrano (Ecuador)

10 February 2016
21:45 UTC−2

São Paulo (Brazil)	1–0	(Peru) Universidad César Vallejo
Rogério 87'	Report

Estádio do Pacaembu, São Paulo
Referee: Christian Ferreyra (Uruguay)

São Paulo won 2–1 on aggregate and advanced to the second stage (Group 1).
