= 2016 Copa Libertadores second stage =

The 2016 Copa Libertadores second stage was played from 16 February to 21 April 2016. A total of 32 teams competed in the second stage to decide the 16 places in the final stages of the 2016 Copa Libertadores.

== Draw ==
The draw of the tournament was held on 22 December 2015, 20:30 PYST (UTC−3), at the CONMEBOL Convention Centre in Luque, Paraguay.

Starting from this season, teams were seeded by the newly established CONMEBOL ranking of the Copa Libertadores (except for teams from Mexico which were not ranked and thus seeded last in all draws), taking into account of the following three factors:

1. Performance in the last 10 years, taking into account Copa Libertadores results in the period 2006–2015
2. Historical coefficient, taking into account Copa Libertadores results in the period 1960–2005
3. Local tournament champion, with bonus points awarded to domestic league champions of the last 10 years

For the second stage, the 32 teams were drawn into eight groups of four containing a team from each of the four pots. The defending champions (River Plate) were automatically placed first in Pot 1 and allocated to Group 1 for the draw. The remaining teams were seeded based on their CONMEBOL ranking (shown in parentheses). Teams from the same association in Pots 1, 2 and 3 could not be drawn into the same group. Teams from Mexico were allocated to Pot 4, together with the winners of the first stage, whose identity was not known at the time of the draw, and they could be drawn into the same group with another team from the same association.

Pot 1	Pot 2	Pot 3	Pot 4
(Argentina) River Plate (2); (Argentina) Boca Juniors (1); (Uruguay) Peñarol (3); (Uruguay) Nacional (5); (Paraguay) Olimpia (7); (Brazil) Corinthians (9); (Brazil) Atlético Mineiro (13); (Argentina) San Lorenzo (14)	(Brazil) Grêmio (16); (Ecuador) Emelec (18); (Paraguay) Cerro Porteño (19); (Colombia) Atlético Nacional (20); (Bolivia) Bolívar (21); (Chile) Colo-Colo (24); (Brazil) Palmeiras (31); (Bolivia) The Strongest (33)	(Ecuador) LDU Quito (34); (Peru) Sporting Cristal (38); (Colombia) Deportivo Cali (44); (Venezuela) Deportivo Táchira (49); (Argentina) Rosario Central (71); (Peru) Melgar (108); (Chile) Cobresal (123); (Venezuela) Trujillanos (175)	(Mexico) Pumas UNAM (no rank); (Mexico) Toluca (no rank); Winner G1; Winner G2; Winner G3; Winner G4; Winner G5; Winner G6

The six winners of the first stage which joined the 26 direct entrants were as follows:

- Winner G1: (Colombia) Santa Fe
- Winner G2: (Argentina) Huracán
- Winner G3: (Argentina) Racing
- Winner G4: (Uruguay) River Plate
- Winner G5: (Ecuador) Independiente del Valle
- Winner G6: (Brazil) São Paulo

== Format ==
In the second stage, each group was played on a home-and-away round-robin basis. The teams were ranked according to points (3 points for a win, 1 point for a draw, and 0 points for a loss). If tied on points, the following criteria would be used to determine the ranking: 1. Goal difference; 2. Goals scored; 3. Away goals scored; 4. Drawing of lots (Regulations Article 5.1). The winners and runners-up of each group advanced to the round of 16.

== Groups ==
The fixture list was determined by the draw as follows:

- Round 1: Team 3 vs. Team 1, Team 4 vs. Team 2
- Round 2: Team 1 vs. Team 4, Team 2 vs. Team 3
- Round 3: Team 2 vs. Team 1, Team 3 vs. Team 4
- Round 4: Team 1 vs. Team 2, Team 4 vs. Team 3
- Round 5: Team 4 vs. Team 1, Team 3 vs. Team 2
- Round 6: Team 1 vs. Team 3, Team 2 vs. Team 4

The matches were played on 16–18, 23–25 February, 1–3, 8–10, 15–17 March, 5–7, 12–14 and 19–21 April 2016.

=== Group 1 ===
Pos	Team	Pld	W	D	L	GF	GA	GD	Pts	Qualification	RIV	SAO	STR	TRU
1	(Argentina) River Plate	6	3	2	1	17	7	+10	11	Final stages	—	1–1	6–0	4–3
2	(Brazil) São Paulo	6	2	3	1	11	5	+6	9	Final stages	2–1	—	0–1	6–0
3	(Bolivia) The Strongest	6	2	2	2	6	11	−5	8		1–1	1–1	—	2–1
4	(Venezuela) Trujillanos	6	1	1	4	7	18	−11	4		0–4	1–1	2–1	—

Source: CONMEBOL
Rules for classification: 1) points; 2) goal difference; 3) goals scored; 4) away goals scored; 5) drawing of lots.
17 February 2016
19:30 UTC−2

São Paulo (Brazil)	0–1	(Bolivia) The Strongest
	Report	M. Alonso 62'

Estádio do Pacaembu, São Paulo
Attendance: 27,168
Referee: Mario Díaz de Vivar (Paraguay)
25 February 2016
20:15 UTC−4:30

Trujillanos (Venezuela)	0–4	(Argentina) River Plate
	Report	Pisculichi 54'; Lucho 62'; I. Alonso 78', 90'

Estadio José Alberto Pérez, Valera
Attendance: 20,000
Referee: Roddy Zambrano (Ecuador)

2 March 2016
16:15 UTC−4

The Strongest (Bolivia)	2–1	(Venezuela) Trujillanos
Escobar 18'; E. Cristaldo 32'	Report	J. Cabezas 37'

Estadio Hernando Siles, La Paz
Attendance: 25,000
Referee: Gustavo Murillo (Colombia)
10 March 2016
19:30 UTC−3

River Plate (Argentina)	1–1	(Brazil) São Paulo
Thiago Mendes 31' (o.g.)	Report	Ganso 16'

Estadio Antonio Vespucio Liberti, Buenos Aires
Attendance: 45,000
Referee: Julio Bascuñán (Chile)

16 March 2016
18:30 UTC−4

The Strongest (Bolivia)	1–1	(Argentina) River Plate
Chumacero 89'	Report	Mora 17'

Estadio Hernando Siles, La Paz
Attendance: 35,000
Referee: Julio Quintana (Paraguay)
16 March 2016
18:00 UTC−4:30

Trujillanos (Venezuela)	1–1	(Brazil) São Paulo
Rojas 35'	Report	Ganso 37'

Estadio José Alberto Pérez, Valera
Attendance: 18,000
Referee: Wilson Lamouroux (Colombia)

5 April 2016
21:45 UTC−3

São Paulo (Brazil)	6–0	(Venezuela) Trujillanos
Calleri 12', 49' (pen.), 79', 86'; Kelvin 18'; João Schmidt 24'	Report

Estádio do Morumbi, São Paulo
Attendance: 18,561
Referee: Ulises Mereles (Paraguay)
6 April 2016
19:30 UTC−3

River Plate (Argentina)	6–0	(Bolivia) The Strongest
D'Alessandro 13'; I. Fernández 25', 82'; Mayada 29'; Mammana 41'; Alario 45'	Report

Estadio Antonio Vespucio Liberti, Buenos Aires
Attendance: 34,000
Referee: Wilson Lamouroux (Colombia)

12 April 2016
18:00 UTC−4:30

Trujillanos (Venezuela)	2–1	(Bolivia) The Strongest
C. Sosa 31'; Cova 90+3' (pen.)	Report	M. Alonso 66'

Estadio José Alberto Pérez, Valera
Attendance: 6,000
Referee: Patricio Polic (Chile)
13 April 2016
21:45 UTC−3

São Paulo (Brazil)	2–1	(Argentina) River Plate
Calleri 28', 59'	Report	I. Alonso 82'

Estádio do Morumbi, São Paulo
Attendance: 51,342
Referee: Andrés Cunha (Uruguay)

21 April 2016
21:45 UTC−3

River Plate (Argentina)	4–3	(Venezuela) Trujillanos
D'Alessandro 8', 18' (pen.); Mayada 48'; Alario 70'	Report	Cova 30'; F. González 73'; J. Cabezas 77' (pen.)

Estadio Antonio Vespucio Liberti, Buenos Aires
Attendance: 40,000
Referee: Víctor Carrillo (Peru)
21 April 2016
20:45 UTC−4

The Strongest (Bolivia)	1–1	(Brazil) São Paulo
E. Cristaldo 28'	Report	Calleri 43'

Estadio Hernando Siles, La Paz
Attendance: 20,000
Referee: Roberto Tobar (Chile)

=== Group 2 ===
Pos	Team	Pld	W	D	L	GF	GA	GD	Pts	Qualification	RCE	NAC	PAL	RPM
1	(Argentina) Rosario Central	6	3	2	1	13	8	+5	11	Final stages	—	1–1	3–3	4–1
2	(Uruguay) Nacional	6	2	3	1	6	6	0	9	Final stages	0–2	—	1–0	0–0
3	(Brazil) Palmeiras	6	2	2	2	12	8	+4	8		2–0	1–2	—	4–0
4	(Uruguay) River Plate	6	0	3	3	6	15	−9	3		1–3	2–2	2–2	—

Source: CONMEBOL
Rules for classification: 1) points; 2) goal difference; 3) goals scored; 4) away goals scored; 5) drawing of lots.
16 February 2016
20:45 UTC−3

River Plate (Uruguay)	2–2	(Brazil) Palmeiras
Santos 50' (pen.); Montelongo 63'	Report	Jean 33'; Gabriel Jesus 57'

Estadio Domingo Burgueño, Maldonado
Attendance: 3,000
Referee: Julio Bascuñán (Chile)
25 February 2016
19:30 UTC−3

Rosario Central (Argentina)	1–1	(Uruguay) Nacional
Larrondo 90' (pen.)	Report	N. López 55'

Estadio Gigante de Arroyito, Rosario
Attendance: 40,000
Referee: Wilmar Roldán (Colombia)

2 March 2016
19:30 UTC−3

Nacional (Uruguay)	0–0	(Uruguay) River Plate
	Report

Gran Parque Central, Montevideo
Attendance: 20,000
Referee: Víctor Hugo Carrillo (Peru)
3 March 2016
21:45 UTC−3

Palmeiras (Brazil)	2–0	(Argentina) Rosario Central
J. Cristaldo 24'; Allione 90+3'	Report

Allianz Parque, São Paulo
Attendance: 36,100
Referee: Enrique Cáceres (Paraguay)

9 March 2016
19:30 UTC−3

Rosario Central (Argentina)	4–1	(Uruguay) River Plate
Ruben 18', 60', 70'; G. Herrera 56'	Report	Santos 63'

Estadio Gigante de Arroyito, Rosario
Attendance: 45,000
Referee: Ulises Mereles (Paraguay)
9 March 2016
21:45 UTC−3

Palmeiras (Brazil)	1–2	(Uruguay) Nacional
Gabriel Jesus 45+3'	Report	N. López 38'; Barcia 40'

Allianz Parque, São Paulo
Attendance: 37,073
Referee: Enrique Osses (Chile)

17 March 2016
19:30 UTC−3

River Plate (Uruguay)	1–3	(Argentina) Rosario Central
Santos 11'	Report	Donatti 13'; Aguirre 50'; Cervi 90+1'

Estadio Centenario, Montevideo
Attendance: 3,500
Referee: José Argote (Venezuela)
17 March 2016
21:45 UTC−3

Nacional (Uruguay)	1–0	(Brazil) Palmeiras
N. López 50'	Report

Gran Parque Central, Montevideo
Attendance: 25,000
Referee: Carlos Vera (Ecuador)

6 April 2016
21:45 UTC−3

Rosario Central (Argentina)	3–3	(Brazil) Palmeiras
Donatti 32'; Cervi 50'; Ruben 66' (pen.)	Report	Gabriel Jesus 5', 44'; Barrios 76'

Estadio Gigante de Arroyito, Rosario
Attendance: 29,000
Referee: Roddy Zambrano (Ecuador)
7 April 2016
19:30 UTC−3

River Plate (Uruguay)	2–2	(Uruguay) Nacional
Taján 5'; Santos 80'	Report	Victorino 7'; Ramírez 71'

Estadio Centenario, Montevideo
Attendance: 10,000
Referee: Enrique Cáceres (Paraguay)

14 April 2016
21:45 UTC−3

Nacional (Uruguay)	0–2	(Argentina) Rosario Central
	Report	Donatti 43'; G. Herrera 69'

Gran Parque Central, Montevideo
Attendance: 20,000
Referee: Roberto García (Mexico)
14 April 2016
21:45 UTC−3

Palmeiras (Brazil)	4–0	(Uruguay) River Plate
Egídio 18'; Allione 45+3', 72'; Alecsandro 80' (pen.)	Report

Allianz Parque, São Paulo
Attendance: 30,416
Referee: Oscar Maldonado (Bolivia)

=== Group 3 ===
Pos	Team	Pld	W	D	L	GF	GA	GD	Pts	Qualification	BOC	RAC	BOL	CAL
1	(Argentina) Boca Juniors	6	3	3	0	11	4	+7	12	Final stages	—	0–0	3–1	6–2
2	(Argentina) Racing	6	2	3	1	11	7	+4	9	Final stages	0–1	—	4−1	4–2
3	(Bolivia) Bolívar	6	1	3	2	10	10	0	6		1–1	1–1	—	5–0
4	(Colombia) Deportivo Cali	6	0	3	3	7	18	−11	3		0−0	2–2	1–1	—

Source: CONMEBOL
Rules for classification: 1) points; 2) goal difference; 3) goals scored; 4) away goals scored; 5) drawing of lots.
24 February 2016
19:30 UTC−3

Racing (Argentina)	4–1	(Bolivia) Bolívar
López 10'; R. Martínez 27'; De Paul 32'; Acuña 82'	Report	Arce 88'

Estadio Presidente Juan Domingo Perón, Avellaneda
Attendance: 20,000
Referee: Ulises Mereles (Paraguay)
24 February 2016
19:45 UTC−5

Deportivo Cali (Colombia)	0–0	(Argentina) Boca Juniors
	Report

Estadio Deportivo Cali, Palmira
Attendance: 35,000
Referee: Péricles Cortez (Brazil)

3 March 2016
19:30 UTC−3

Boca Juniors (Argentina)	0–0	(Argentina) Racing
	Report

Estadio Alberto J. Armando, Buenos Aires
Attendance: 0
Referee: Sandro Ricci (Brazil)
3 March 2016
20:45 UTC−4

Bolívar (Bolivia)	5–0	(Colombia) Deportivo Cali
Arce 3', 18', 77'; Capdevila 39'; R. Cardozo 72'	Report

Estadio Hernando Siles, La Paz
Attendance: 20,000
Referee: Carlos Orbe (Ecuador)

10 March 2016
20:45 UTC−4

Bolívar (Bolivia)	1–1	(Argentina) Boca Juniors
Saavedra 27'	Report	Carrizo 90+4'

Estadio Hernando Siles, La Paz
Attendance: 36,000
Referee: Andrés Cunha (Uruguay)
17 March 2016
19:45 UTC−5

Deportivo Cali (Colombia)	2–2	(Argentina) Racing
Roa 9'; Sambueza 33'	Report	Grimi 60'; López 71'

Estadio Deportivo Cali, Palmira
Attendance: 20,000
Referee: Diego Haro (Peru)

7 April 2016
19:30 UTC−3

Boca Juniors (Argentina)	3–1	(Bolivia) Bolívar
Gago 32'; Tévez 42'; Carrizo 48'	Report	Callejón 71' (pen.)

Estadio Alberto J. Armando, Buenos Aires
Attendance: 39,000
Referee: Víctor Carrillo (Peru)
7 April 2016
21:45 UTC−3

Racing (Argentina)	4–2	(Colombia) Deportivo Cali
Grimi 6'; López 26'; O. Romero 37'; R. Martínez 80'	Report	Roa 48'; A. Pérez 90'

Estadio Presidente Juan Domingo Perón, Avellaneda
Attendance: 31,000
Referee: Héber Lopes (Brazil)

13 April 2016
19:30 UTC−3

Racing (Argentina)	0–1	(Argentina) Boca Juniors
	Report	Lodeiro 83'

Estadio Presidente Juan Domingo Perón, Avellaneda
Attendance: 34,000
Referee: Carlos Vera (Ecuador)
14 April 2016
19:45 UTC−5

Deportivo Cali (Colombia)	1–1	(Bolivia) Bolívar
Lozano 3'	Report	Cellerino 66'

Estadio Deportivo Cali, Palmira
Attendance: 2,000
Referee: Julio Quintana (Paraguay)

20 April 2016
19:30 UTC−3

Boca Juniors (Argentina)	6–2	(Colombia) Deportivo Cali
Fabra 16'; Tévez 38', 71'; Chávez 47'; Jara 78'; Palacios 86'	Report	Casierra 35', 37'

Estadio Alberto J. Armando, Buenos Aires
Attendance: 45,000
Referee: Christian Ferreyra (Uruguay)
20 April 2016
18:30 UTC−4

Bolívar (Bolivia)	1–1	(Argentina) Racing
Cellerino 68'	Report	R. Martínez 73'

Estadio Hernando Siles, La Paz
Attendance: 17,000
Referee: Fernando Guerrero (Mexico)

=== Group 4 ===
Pos	Team	Pld	W	D	L	GF	GA	GD	Pts	Qualification	ATL	HUR	PEN	CRI
1	(Colombia) Atlético Nacional	6	5	1	0	12	0	+12	16	Final stages	—	0–0	2–0	3–0
2	(Argentina) Huracán	6	2	2	2	7	7	0	8	Final stages	0–2	—	0–0	4–2
3	(Uruguay) Peñarol	6	1	2	3	5	11	−6	5		0–4	0–1	—	4–3
4	(Peru) Sporting Cristal	6	1	1	4	9	15	−6	4		0–1	3–2	1–1	—

Source: CONMEBOL
Rules for classification: 1) points; 2) goal difference; 3) goals scored; 4) away goals scored; 5) drawing of lots.
18 February 2016
19:45 UTC−5

Sporting Cristal (Peru)	1–1	(Uruguay) Peñarol
Rodríguez 74'	Report	Aguiar 39'

Estadio Nacional, Lima
Attendance: 27,500
Referee: Wilton Sampaio (Brazil)
23 February 2016
21:45 UTC−3

Huracán (Argentina)	0–2	(Colombia) Atlético Nacional
	Report	Moreno 44'; Berrío 81'

Estadio Tomás Adolfo Ducó, Buenos Aires
Attendance: 12,000
Referee: Roberto Tobar (Chile)

1 March 2016
19:45 UTC−5

Atlético Nacional (Colombia)	3–0	(Peru) Sporting Cristal
Sánchez 11'; Copete 32'; Moreno 73'	Report

Estadio Atanasio Girardot, Medellín
Attendance: 44,109
Referee: Oscar Maldonado (Bolivia)
1 March 2016
21:45 UTC−3

Peñarol (Uruguay)	0–1	(Argentina) Huracán
	Report	Kaku 7'

Estadio Centenario, Montevideo
Attendance: 40,000
Referee: César Arturo Ramos (Mexico)

8 March 2016
19:45 UTC−5

Atlético Nacional (Colombia)	2–0	(Uruguay) Peñarol
Bocanegra 54'; Moreno 60'	Report

Estadio Atanasio Girardot, Medellín
Attendance: 43,698
Referee: Héber Lopes (Brazil)
8 March 2016
19:45 UTC−5

Sporting Cristal (Peru)	3–2	(Argentina) Huracán
Costa 25'; S. Silva 35', 55' (pen.)	Report	Ábila 56', 78'

Estadio Nacional, Lima
Attendance: 12,000
Referee: Mario Díaz de Vivar (Paraguay)

15 March 2016
21:45 UTC−3

Peñarol (Uruguay)	0–4	(Colombia) Atlético Nacional
	Report	Copete 8'; Bocanegra 45'; Berrío 81'; L. Ruiz 84'

Estadio Centenario, Montevideo
Attendance: 20,000
Referee: Julio Bascuñán (Chile)
5 April 2016
19:30 UTC−3

Huracán (Argentina)	4–2	(Peru) Sporting Cristal
Ábila 23', 30'; Kaku 67'; Miralles 83'	Report	S. Silva 17'; Calcaterra 42'

Estadio Tomás Adolfo Ducó, Buenos Aires
Attendance: 27,000
Referee: Raphael Claus (Brazil)

12 April 2016
19:30 UTC−3

Huracán (Argentina)	0–0	(Uruguay) Peñarol
	Report

Estadio Tomás Adolfo Ducó, Buenos Aires
Attendance: 25,000
Referee: Omar Ponce (Ecuador)
12 April 2016
19:45 UTC−5

Sporting Cristal (Peru)	0–1	(Colombia) Atlético Nacional
	Report	Ibarbo 11' (pen.)

Estadio Nacional, Lima
Attendance: 7,000
Referee: Juan Soto (Venezuela)

19 April 2016
19:30 UTC−3

Peñarol (Uruguay)	4–3	(Peru) Sporting Cristal
Aguiar 29'; Novick 72', 80'; Albarracín 85'	Report	Rodríguez 18', 23'; I. Ávila 36'

Estadio Campeón del Siglo, Montevideo
Attendance: 5,000
Referee: Luiz Flávio de Oliveira (Brazil)
19 April 2016
17:30 UTC−5

Atlético Nacional (Colombia)	0–0	(Argentina) Huracán
	Report

Estadio Atanasio Girardot, Medellín
Attendance: 35,018
Referee: Enrique Osses (Chile)

=== Group 5 ===
Pos	Team	Pld	W	D	L	GF	GA	GD	Pts	Qualification	CAM	IDV	CCL	MEL
1	(Brazil) Atlético Mineiro	6	4	1	1	12	4	+8	13	Final stages	—	1−0	3−0	4–0
2	(Ecuador) Independiente del Valle	6	3	2	1	7	4	+3	11	Final stages	3–2	—	1–1	2−0
3	(Chile) Colo-Colo	6	2	3	1	4	5	−1	9		0–0	0–0	—	1−0
4	(Peru) Melgar	6	0	0	6	2	12	−10	0		1–2	0–1	1–2	—

Source: CONMEBOL
Rules for classification: 1) points; 2) goal difference; 3) goals scored; 4) away goals scored; 5) drawing of lots.
17 February 2016
18:45 UTC−5

Melgar (Peru)	1–2	(Brazil) Atlético Mineiro
O. Fernández 14'	Report	Rafael Carioca 20'; Patric 38'

Estadio Monumental de la UNSA, Arequipa
Attendance: 30,000
Referee: Wilson Lamouroux (Colombia)
18 February 2016
19:45 UTC−5

Independiente del Valle (Ecuador)	1–1	(Chile) Colo-Colo
Orejuela 66'	Report	Paredes 62'

Estadio Rumiñahui, Sangolquí
Attendance: 7,000
Referee: José Argote (Venezuela)

24 February 2016
19:30 UTC−3

Colo-Colo (Chile)	1–0	(Peru) Melgar
Paredes 64'	Report

Estadio Monumental David Arellano, Santiago
Attendance: 30,000
Referee: Julio Quintana (Paraguay)
24 February 2016
21:45 UTC−3

Atlético Mineiro (Brazil)	1–0	(Ecuador) Independiente del Valle
Pratto 3'	Report

Estádio Independência, Belo Horizonte
Attendance: 20,851
Referee: Fernando Rapallini (Argentina)

1 March 2016
15:15 UTC−5

Melgar (Peru)	0–1	(Ecuador) Independiente del Valle
	Report	Sornoza 36'

Estadio Monumental de la UNSA, Arequipa
Attendance: 15,000
Referee: Óscar Rojas (Uruguay)
10 March 2016
21:45 UTC−3

Colo-Colo (Chile)	0–0	(Brazil) Atlético Mineiro
	Report

Estadio Monumental David Arellano, Santiago
Attendance: 30,000
Referee: Gery Vargas (Bolivia)

15 March 2016
17:30 UTC−5

Independiente del Valle (Ecuador)	2–0	(Peru) Melgar
Sornoza 2'; Jo. Angulo 46'	Report

Estadio Rumiñahui, Sangolquí
Attendance: 4,000
Referee: Raúl Orosco (Bolivia)
16 March 2016
21:45 UTC−3

Atlético Mineiro (Brazil)	3–0	(Chile) Colo-Colo
Cazares 1'; Patric 45'; Hyuri 72'	Report

Estádio Independência, Belo Horizonte
Attendance: 21,201
Referee: Juan Soto (Venezuela)

6 April 2016
19:45 UTC−5

Independiente del Valle (Ecuador)	3–2	(Brazil) Atlético Mineiro
B. Cabezas 5'; Sornoza 20', 39' (pen.)	Report	Júnior Urso 9'; Pratto 48' (pen.)

Estadio Rumiñahui, Sangolquí
Attendance: 5,000
Referee: Darío Herrera (Argentina)
7 April 2016
19:45 UTC−5

Melgar (Peru)	1–2	(Chile) Colo-Colo
Cuesta 48'	Report	Paredes 68', 72'

Estadio Monumental de la UNSA, Arequipa
Attendance: 8,000
Referee: Luis Sánchez (Colombia)

14 April 2016
19:30 UTC−3

Atlético Mineiro (Brazil)	4–0	(Peru) Melgar
Tiago 1'; Robinho 7'; Pratto 16' (pen.); Carlos 68'	Report

Estádio Mineirão, Belo Horizonte
Attendance: 36,031
Referee: Jesús Valenzuela (Venezuela)
14 April 2016
19:30 UTC−3

Colo-Colo (Chile)	0–0	(Ecuador) Independiente del Valle
	Report

Estadio Monumental David Arellano, Santiago
Attendance: 36,000
Referee: Patricio Loustau (Argentina)

=== Group 6 ===
Pos	Team	Pld	W	D	L	GF	GA	GD	Pts	Qualification	TOL	GRE	SLA	LDU
1	(Mexico) Toluca	6	4	1	1	9	5	+4	13	Final stages	—	2–0	2–1	2–1
2	(Brazil) Grêmio	6	3	2	1	10	6	+4	11	Final stages	1–0	—	1–1	4–0
3	(Argentina) San Lorenzo	6	0	4	2	5	8	−3	4		1–1	1–1	—	1–1
4	(Ecuador) LDU Quito	6	1	1	4	7	12	−5	4		1–2	2–3	2–0	—

Source: CONMEBOL
Rules for classification: 1) points; 2) goal difference; 3) goals scored; 4) away goals scored; 5) drawing of lots.
17 February 2016
20:00 UTC−6

Toluca (Mexico)	2–0	(Brazil) Grêmio
Triverio 46', 76' (pen.)	Report

Estadio Nemesio Díez, Toluca
Attendance: 12,000
Referee: Gery Vargas (Bolivia)
23 February 2016
17:30 UTC−5

LDU Quito (Ecuador)	2–0	(Argentina) San Lorenzo
Morales 49', 90+1'	Report

Estadio de Liga Deportiva Universitaria, Quito
Attendance: 25,000
Referee: Jonhatan Fuentes (Uruguay)

2 March 2016
19:30 UTC−3

San Lorenzo (Argentina)	1–1	(Mexico) Toluca
Ortigoza 11' (pen.)	Report	Esquivel 12'

Estadio Pedro Bidegain, Buenos Aires
Attendance: 22,000
Referee: Enrique Osses (Chile)
2 March 2016
21:45 UTC−3

Grêmio (Brazil)	4–0	(Ecuador) LDU Quito
Maicon 11'; Bolaños 36'; Henrique Almeida 82'; Everton 88'	Report

Arena do Grêmio, Porto Alegre
Attendance: 37,702
Referee: Jesús Valenzuela (Venezuela)

9 March 2016
21:45 UTC−3

Grêmio (Brazil)	1–1	(Argentina) San Lorenzo
Fred 25'	Report	Cauteruccio 32'

Arena do Grêmio, Porto Alegre
Attendance: 39,176
Referee: Daniel Fedorczuk (Uruguay)
10 March 2016
19:45 UTC−5

LDU Quito (Ecuador)	1–2	(Mexico) Toluca
Hidalgo 47'	Report	Tenorio 41' (o.g.); Uribe 84'

Estadio de Liga Deportiva Universitaria, Quito
Attendance: 30,000
Referee: Wilson Lamouroux (Colombia)

15 March 2016
21:45 UTC−3

San Lorenzo (Argentina)	1–1	(Brazil) Grêmio
Ortigoza 3' (pen.)	Report	Lincoln 89'

Estadio Pedro Bidegain, Buenos Aires
Attendance: 27,000
Referee: Andrés Cunha (Uruguay)
5 April 2016
19:45 UTC−5

Toluca (Mexico)	2–1	(Ecuador) LDU Quito
Vega 18'; Triverio 62'	Report	Puch 17'

Estadio Nemesio Díez, Toluca
Attendance: 10,000
Referee: José Argote (Venezuela)

12 April 2016
19:45 UTC−5

Toluca (Mexico)	2–1	(Argentina) San Lorenzo
Uribe 81', 87'	Report	Blandi 43'

Estadio Nemesio Díez, Toluca
Attendance: 15,000
Referee: Wilmar Roldán (Colombia)
13 April 2016
19:45 UTC−5

LDU Quito (Ecuador)	2–3	(Brazil) Grêmio
Quinteros 46'; Cevallos 76'	Report	Douglas 12'; Bobô 25'; Walace 51'

Estadio de Liga Deportiva Universitaria, Quito
Attendance: 8,000
Referee: Roberto Tobar (Chile)

19 April 2016
21:45 UTC−3

San Lorenzo (Argentina)	1–1	(Ecuador) LDU Quito
E. Ávila 80'	Report	Cevallos 46'

Estadio Pedro Bidegain, Buenos Aires
Attendance: 17,000
Referee: Ulises Mereles (Paraguay)
19 April 2016
21:45 UTC−3

Grêmio (Brazil)	1–0	(Mexico) Toluca
Ramiro 15'	Report

Arena do Grêmio, Porto Alegre
Attendance: 34,628
Referee: Gustavo Murillo (Colombia)

=== Group 7 ===
Pos	Team	Pld	W	D	L	GF	GA	GD	Pts	Qualification	PUM	TAC	OLI	EME
1	(Mexico) Pumas UNAM	6	5	0	1	17	8	+9	15	Final stages	—	4–1	4–1	4–2
2	(Venezuela) Deportivo Táchira	6	3	0	3	6	11	−5	9	Final stages	2–0	—	2–1	1–0
3	(Paraguay) Olimpia	6	2	1	3	12	12	0	7		0–2	4–0	—	4–2
4	(Ecuador) Emelec	6	1	1	4	10	14	−4	4		2–3	2–0	2–2	—

Source: CONMEBOL
Rules for classification: 1) points; 2) goal difference; 3) goals scored; 4) away goals scored; 5) drawing of lots.
16 February 2016
21:30 UTC−4:30

Deportivo Táchira (Venezuela)	2–1	(Paraguay) Olimpia
Mosquera 41'; Pérez Greco 61'	Report	Núñez 78'

Estadio Polideportivo de Pueblo Nuevo, San Cristóbal
Attendance: 18,000
Referee: Héber Lopes (Brazil)
18 February 2016
21:00 UTC−6

Pumas UNAM (Mexico)	4–2	(Ecuador) Emelec
I. Sosa 1'; Verón 22'; Alcoba 69'; Mina 72' (o.g.)	Report	Mena 17', 66'

Estadio Olímpico Universitario, Mexico City
Attendance: 20,000
Referee: Diego Haro (Peru)

25 February 2016
19:45 UTC−5

Emelec (Ecuador)	2–0	(Venezuela) Deportivo Táchira
Em. Herrera 80' (pen.); Stracqualursi 83'	Report

Estadio Reales Tamarindos, Portoviejo
Attendance: 7,000
Referee: Raúl Orosco (Bolivia)
1 March 2016
19:30 UTC−3

Olimpia (Paraguay)	0–2	(Mexico) Pumas UNAM
	Report	Quiñones 51'; I. Sosa 71'

Estadio Defensores del Chaco, Asunción
Attendance: 12,000
Referee: Germán Delfino (Argentina)

8 March 2016
17:30 UTC−5

Emelec (Ecuador)	2–2	(Paraguay) Olimpia
Giménez 3', 89'	Report	Paniagua 11'; B. Riveros 20'

Estadio Jocay, Manta
Attendance: 10,000
Referee: Wilton Sampaio (Brazil)
9 March 2016
20:15 UTC−4:30

Deportivo Táchira (Venezuela)	2–0	(Mexico) Pumas UNAM
S. Herrera 7'; Cermeño 43'	Report

Estadio Polideportivo de Pueblo Nuevo, San Cristóbal
Attendance: 18,000
Referee: Jorge Baliño (Argentina)

17 March 2016
19:30 UTC−3

Olimpia (Paraguay)	4–2	(Ecuador) Emelec
C. Riveros 30'; A. Silva 54' (pen.); Bareiro 72'; Caballero 90+1'	Report	Guanca 19'; P. Quiñónez 70'

Estadio Defensores del Chaco, Asunción
Attendance: 15,000
Referee: Darío Herrera (Argentina)
17 March 2016
21:00 UTC−6

Pumas UNAM (Mexico)	4–1	(Venezuela) Deportivo Táchira
Alcoba 30'; H. Ruíz 52'; I. Sosa 60', 85'	Report	Pérez Greco 81'

Estadio Olímpico Universitario, Mexico City
Attendance: 10,000
Referee: Ricardo Marques (Brazil)

5 April 2016
18:00 UTC−4:30

Deportivo Táchira (Venezuela)	1–0	(Ecuador) Emelec
Ángel 22'	Report

Estadio Polideportivo de Pueblo Nuevo, San Cristóbal
Attendance: 7,000
Referee: Christian Ferreyra (Uruguay)
6 April 2016
22:00 UTC−5

Pumas UNAM (Mexico)	4–1	(Paraguay) Olimpia
Alcoba 46'; Britos 49'; Ed. Herrera 54'; I. Sosa 68'	Report	C. Riveros 20'

Estadio Olímpico Universitario, Mexico City
Attendance: 13,000
Referee: Julio Bascuñán (Chile)

13 April 2016
18:30 UTC−4

Olimpia (Paraguay)	4–0	(Venezuela) Deportivo Táchira
Vargas 17'; Torres 39'; Bareiro 60'; Mencia 62'	Report

Estadio Manuel Ferreira, Asunción
Attendance: 8,000
Referee: Leandro Vuaden (Brazil)
13 April 2016
17:30 UTC−5

Emelec (Ecuador)	2–3	(Mexico) Pumas UNAM
Matamoros 45'; Guanca 71' (pen.)	Report	F. Martínez 12', 60'; Quiñones 34'

Estadio Jocay, Manta
Attendance: 2,000
Referee: Fernando Rapallini (Argentina)

=== Group 8 ===
Pos	Team	Pld	W	D	L	GF	GA	GD	Pts	Qualification	COR	CER	ISF	COB
1	(Brazil) Corinthians	6	4	1	1	13	4	+9	13	Final stages	—	2–0	1–0	6–0
2	(Paraguay) Cerro Porteño	6	3	1	2	6	7	−1	10	Final stages	3–2	—	1–0	2–1
3	(Colombia) Santa Fe	6	2	2	2	6	4	+2	8		1–1	0–0	—	3–0
4	(Chile) Cobresal	6	1	0	5	4	14	−10	3		0–1	2–0	1–2	—

Source: CONMEBOL
Rules for classification: 1) points; 2) goal difference; 3) goals scored; 4) away goals scored; 5) drawing of lots.
16 February 2016
21:00 UTC−5

Santa Fe (Colombia)	0–0	(Paraguay) Cerro Porteño
	Report

Estadio El Campín, Bogotá
Attendance: 15,000
Referee: Roberto García Orozco (Mexico)
17 February 2016
20:45 UTC−3

Cobresal (Chile)	0–1	(Brazil) Corinthians
	Report	Escalona 90' (o.g.)

Estadio El Cobre, El Salvador
Attendance: 4,000
Referee: Andrés Cunha (Uruguay)

25 February 2016
19:30 UTC−3

Cerro Porteño (Paraguay)	2–1	(Chile) Cobresal
Santana 49'; Leal 51'	Report	Maldonado 61'

Estadio Defensores del Chaco, Asunción
Attendance: 20,000
Referee: Néstor Pitana (Argentina)
2 March 2016
21:45 UTC−3

Corinthians (Brazil)	1–0	(Colombia) Santa Fe
Guilherme 64'	Report

Arena Corinthians, São Paulo
Attendance: 38,818
Referee: Mauro Vigliano (Argentina)

9 March 2016
17:15 UTC−3

Cobresal (Chile)	1–2	(Colombia) Santa Fe
Poblete 89'	Report	Jerez 16' (o.g.); Salazar 33'

Estadio El Cobre, El Salvador
Attendance: 1,699
Referee: Roddy Zambrano (Ecuador)
9 March 2016
19:30 UTC−3

Cerro Porteño (Paraguay)	3–2	(Brazil) Corinthians
Beltrán 48', 81'; Díaz 75'	Report	André 12'; Giovanni Augusto 87' (pen.)

Estadio Defensores del Chaco, Asunción
Attendance: 20,000
Referee: Diego Haro (Peru)

15 March 2016
17:30 UTC−5

Santa Fe (Colombia)	3–0	(Chile) Cobresal
Gómez 7', 39'; Tesillo 73'	Report

Estadio El Campín, Bogotá
Attendance: 12,187
Referee: Oscar Maldonado (Bolivia)
16 March 2016
21:45 UTC−3

Corinthians (Brazil)	2–0	(Paraguay) Cerro Porteño
Lucca 24'; Mareco 62' (o.g.)	Report

Arena Corinthians, São Paulo
Attendance: 42,403
Referee: Patricio Loustau (Argentina)

6 April 2016
19:45 UTC−5

Santa Fe (Colombia)	1–1	(Brazil) Corinthians
Otero 45+2'	Report	Elias 57'

Estadio El Campín, Bogotá
Attendance: 22,000
Referee: Néstor Pitana (Argentina)
13 April 2016
17:15 UTC−3

Cobresal (Chile)	2–0	(Paraguay) Cerro Porteño
Maldonado 85'; Jerez 90+4'	Report

Estadio El Cobre, El Salvador
Attendance: 500
Referee: Raúl Orosco (Bolivia)

20 April 2016
21:45 UTC−3

Corinthians (Brazil)	6–0	(Chile) Cobresal
Marlone 8', 38'; A. Romero 12', 76'; Guilherme Arana 44'; Elias 74'	Report

Arena Corinthians, São Paulo
Attendance: 41,740
Referee: Carlos Orbe (Ecuador)
20 April 2016
20:45 UTC−4

Cerro Porteño (Paraguay)	1–0	(Colombia) Santa Fe
J. Alonso 33'	Report

Estadio Defensores del Chaco, Asunción
Attendance: 10,000
Referee: Héber Lopes (Brazil)
