= Reinaldo Rueda =

Colombian football manager

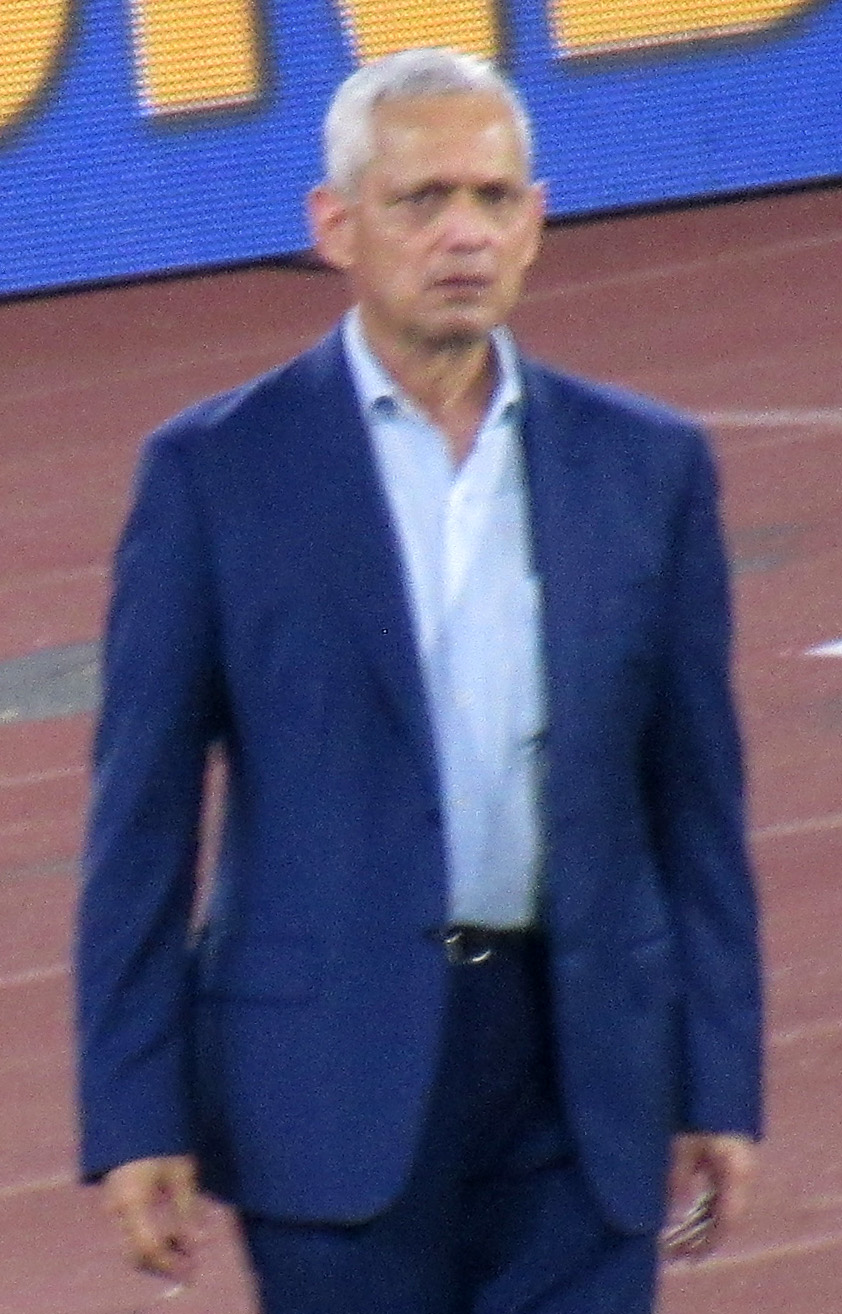
- Rueda in 2022

Personal information
- Full name: Reinaldo Rueda Rivera
- Date of birth: 16 April 1957 (age 69)
- Place of birth: Cali, Colombia
- Height: 1.73 m (5 ft 8 in)

Managerial career
- Years: Team
- 1994–1997: Cortuluá
- 1997–1998: Deportivo Cali
- 2002: Independiente Medellín
- 2002–2004: Colombia U-20
- 2004–2006: Colombia
- 2007–2010: Honduras
- 2010–2014: Ecuador
- 2015–2017: Atlético Nacional
- 2017: Flamengo
- 2018–2021: Chile
- 2021–2022: Colombia
- 2023–2025: Honduras
Medal record
Men's football
Representing Colombia (as manager)
Copa América
Bronze medal – third place	2021

Reinaldo Rueda Rivera (born 16 April 1957) is a Colombian football coach. He last managed the Honduras national team.

When he was the coach of the Colombia U-20 team, they finished 3rd at the 2003 FIFA World Youth Championship. He also led the Colombia U-17 team to 4th at the 2003 FIFA U-17 World Championship.

After an unfavorable start to the 2006 World Cup qualification phase (only 1 point after 5 games) the Colombian Football Federation made Rueda the coach of the senior team. Under him, the team improved, coming from near last to finish 6th, though failing to qualify. Then, he moved to Honduras and guided their national team to a place at the 2010 FIFA World Cup. Later on, he coached the Ecuador national team, taking them to the 2014 FIFA World Cup. Afterwards, he managed Atlético Nacional, winning the 2016 Copa Libertadores, and Flamengo, before resuming international roles with the Chile national team as well as Colombia and Honduras.

== Early life ==
Born in Cali, Rueda holds a physical education degree. He completed his master's degree at the Deutsche Sporthochschule Köln, Germany, where he also gained proficiency in the German language. He is also a university professor and has taught several courses at the Colombian National Coaches School. He has continued his studies in Europe, attending FIFA and UEFA coaching courses.

== Managerial career ==
=== Early career ===
As a footballer, Rueda played for emerging clubs in amateur and college competitions. However, he decided that coaching would be a better way and later became the coach of Independiente Medellín, Deportivo Cali, and Cortuluá.

=== Colombia national team ===
As a coach Rueda was in charge of the Colombia U-17, U-20, U-21, U-23 and senior teams. Rueda made the final qualifying rounds with the Colombia U-21 in the Toulon Tournament in France in 2000 and 2001. In the first tournament, During Rueda's tenure, Colombia defeated the Republic of Ireland (1–0), Ghana (4–1) and Côte d'Ivoire (3–1). In the final against Portugal on 3 June, Colombia won the championship on penalties (3–1).

At the 2003 South American U-20 tournament in Uruguay, Rueda assured his team a ticket to the FIFA U-20 World Cup after a 10-year hiatus. His successes made him the coach of the senior side in 2004 for the task to qualify for the 2006 FIFA World Cup. However, it proved to be a failure and Rueda was sacked after two years in charge.

=== Honduras national team ===
Rueda took the helm of the Honduras national football team in January 2007, and led the team to qualification for the 2010 FIFA World Cup, ending 28 years of qualification failures. However, he came under intense scrutiny following criticism of his tactics as the team exited the World Cup at the first stage. On 28 July 2010, Rueda stepped down as Honduras coach after three years at the helm.

=== Ecuador national team ===
In August 2010, Rueda took charge as manager of the Ecuador national team. At the 2011 Copa América, the team finished last in a group with Brazil, Venezuela and Paraguay. On 11 October 2013 Ecuador secured a crucial 1–0 win over direct rivals Uruguay in the 17th round of the 2014 FIFA World Cup qualifying. Four days later, even with an Ecuador loss to Chile and a Uruguay win over Argentina in the final round with both teams tying for points and wins, Rueda's side clinched direct qualification with a fourth-place finish due to a better goal difference. At the World Cup, Ecuador exited in the group stage placed third following a 2–1 loss to Switzerland, a 2–1 win over Honduras and a 0–0 draw to France.

=== Atlético Nacional ===
On 6 June 2015, Rueda was appointed at Atlético Nacional. In December, the team won the 2015 Torneo Finalización, Rueda's inaugural title in charge of a senior side. Atlético Nacional started off the 2016 season with a 5–0 aggregate win over Deportivo Cali in the Superliga. In the Copa Libertadores, the team had the best campaign in the group stage, with five wins and one draw; in the knockout rounds, they beat Huracán, Rosario Central and São Paulo, before facing Independiente del Valle in the finals and winning the title with an aggregate 2–1 win. They additionally reached the Copa Sudamericana finals that year, finishing as runners-up as the club's board decided to concede the title to Chapecoense. In 2017, Atlético faced Chapecoense in the Recopa Sudamericana and won 6–2 aggregate. Rueda left the club in June, after adding another league title to his tally with the 2017 Apertura.

=== Flamengo ===
On 14 August 2017, Rueda joined Brazilian club Flamengo. Under his management, the team reached the finals of the 2017 Copa do Brasil and the 2017 Copa Sudamericana, finishing as runners-up in both competitions. He left at the end of the season, after securing qualification for the 2018 Copa Libertadores group stage with a sixth-place finish in the Série A.

=== Chile national team ===
On 8 January 2018, Rueda returned to international management and took charge of the Chile national team. His first match was on 24 March, a 2–1 friendly win over Sweden. At the 2019 Copa América, Chile finished second place in Group C behind Uruguay; in the quarter-finals, they knocked Colombia out in the penalty shootouts after a goalless draw in regulation time. The team finished the tournament in fourth place following a 3–0 loss to Peru in the semi-finals and a 2–1 loss to Argentina in the third place play-off. His stint with Chile ended short when Chile only gained four points after the four first matches in the 2022 FIFA World Cup qualification.

=== Return to the Colombia national team ===
On 14 January 2021, the Colombian Football Federation announced Rueda's return to the national team. He made his returning debut in the match against Peru for the second time in the 2022 FIFA World Cup qualification, having faced the same opponent in the same qualification as coach of Chile, and made Colombia reach 3rd place in the 2021 Copa América. Again with the qualifications, Colombia managed to defeat Peru 3–0, tied Argentina and Bolivia with a result of 2–2 and 1–1 respectively, to return to the last same scoreline with Paraguay, and a 3–1 win against Chile. However, after the game with Chile, Rueda's team fell into a goal drought, drawing 0–0 with Uruguay, Brazil and Ecuador consecutively, and losing 1–0 again to Brazil. Colombia again drew goalless with Paraguay, and lost the following matches with Peru and Argentina continuing their drought. Colombia finally scored their victories, winning 3–0 against Bolivia and a final victory of 1–0 against Venezuela, however, due to previous results, Colombia finished in sixth place, being eliminated from the World Cup. Rueda left the Colombian team shortly after.

=== Return to the Honduras national team ===
In July 2023, Rueda was re-appointed as head coach of the Honduras national team. Under his leadership, Honduras reached the semi-final stage of the 2025 CONCACAF Gold Cup, its first return to that phase of the tournament in over a decade. In the subsequent 2026 FIFA World Cup qualifying campaign, Honduras finished second in their group behind Haiti and missed the inter-confederation play-offs on goal difference, failing to reach the World Cup. Rueda was dismissed from his position shortly thereafter.

== Personal life ==
In 2011, Rueda was naturalized as a Honduran citizen.

== Managerial statistics ==
As of match played 14 November 2025

Managerial record by team and tenure
Team	From	To	Record				
Team	From	To	P	W	D	L	Win %
Colombia U-20	1 July 1992	31 July 1993	9	3	3	3	33.33
Cortuluá	12 May 1994	20 April 1997	124	32	43	49	25.81
Deportivo Cali	5 June 1997	20 September 1998	63	28	15	20	44.44
Colombia U-20	1 January 1999	12 May 2002	12	6	4	2	50.00
Colombia	7 May 2002	12 May 2002	3	1	1	1	33.33
Independiente Medellín	24 May 2002	19 September 2002	10	3	3	4	30.00
Colombia U-20	20 September 2002	5 January 2004	19	10	4	5	52.63
Colombia	30 January 2004	30 April 2006	43	18	13	12	41.86
Honduras	25 January 2007	29 July 2010	53	31	5	17	58.49
Ecuador	10 August 2010	13 July 2014	50	19	17	14	38.00
Atlético Nacional	2 June 2015	21 June 2017	147	85	39	23	57.82
Flamengo	14 August 2017	8 January 2018	31	13	10	8	41.94
Chile	8 January 2018	13 January 2021	27	9	8	10	33.33
Colombia	14 January 2021	18 April 2022	22	7	10	5	31.82
Honduras	16 July 2023	19 November 2025	34	16	7	11	47.06
Total			647	281	182	184	43.43

== Honours ==
=== Manager ===
Atlético Nacional

- Categoría Primera A (2): 2015 Finalización, 2017 Apertura
- Superliga Colombiana (1): 2016
- Copa Colombia (1): 2016
- Copa Libertadores (1): 2016
- Recopa Sudamericana (1): 2017

Colombia U-21

- Toulon Tournament (1): 2000

== See also ==
- National team managers with 100 or more matches
