= Librado Azcona =

Paraguayan footballer (born 1984)

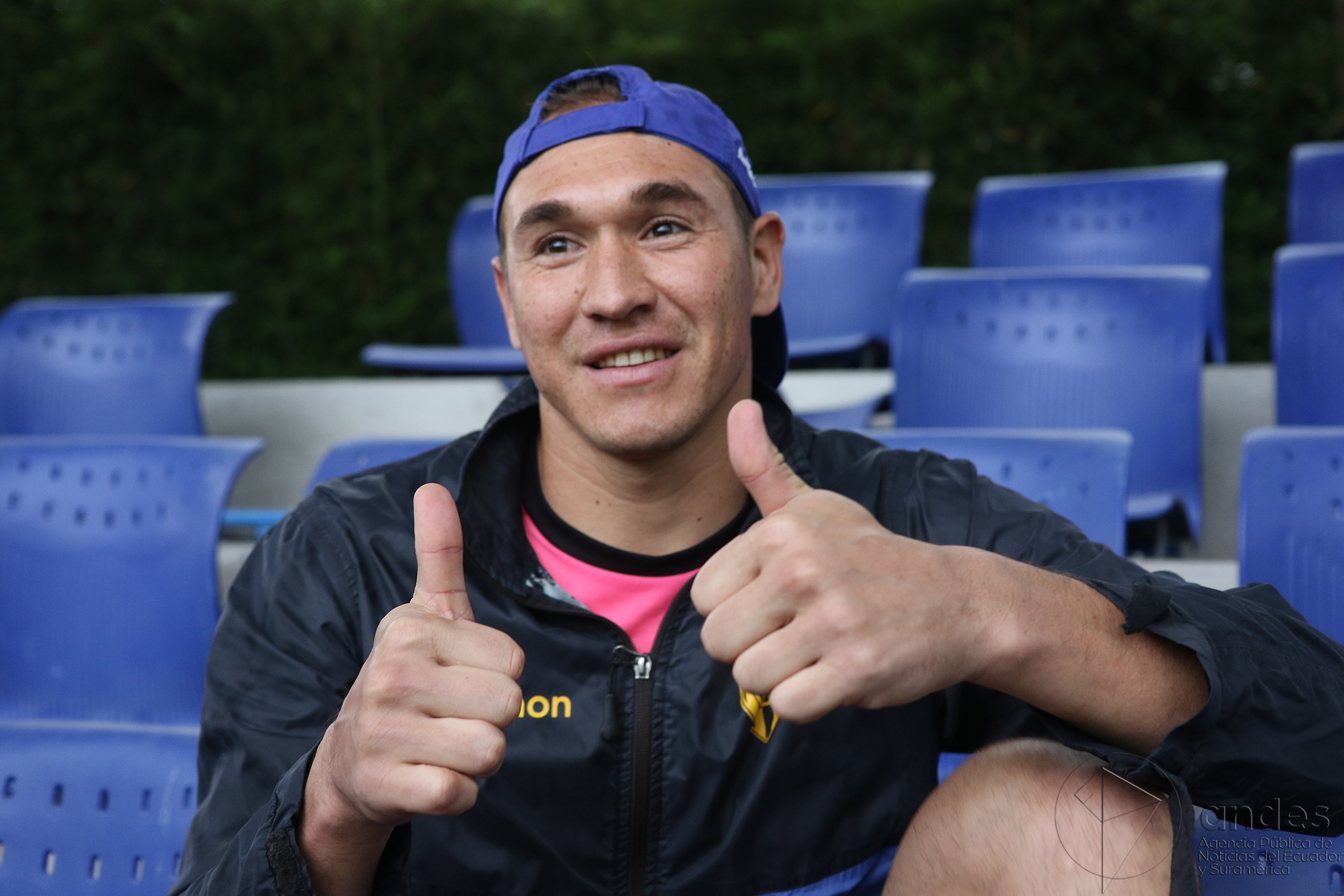

Personal information
- Full name: Daniel Librado Azcona Salinas
- Date of birth: January 18, 1984 (age 42)
- Place of birth: Caacupé, Paraguay
- Height: 1.84 m (6 ft 0 in)
- Position: Goalkeeper

Senior career*
Years	Team	Apps	(Gls)
2005–2008	12 de Octubre	5	(0)
2009	LDU Loja	35	(1)
2010–2016	Independiente DV	277	(0)
2017–2020	Olimpia	46	(0)
2021	River Plate	19	(0)
- * Club domestic league appearances and goals as of 23:47, 28 February 2022 (UTC)

Daniel Librado Azcona Salinas (born January 18, 1984) is a Paraguayan footballer who plays as a goalkeeper.

== International career ==
Paraguayan-born Azcona has played football in Ecuador spanning back to 2009 with LDU Loja. He became an Ecuadorian citizen and was eligible for the Ecuador national football team. He made the cut for the final 23 squad for 2015 Copa América.

== Honours ==
Independiente

- Copa Libertadores Runner Up: 2016

Olimpia Asunción

- Paraguayan Primera División (5): 2018 Apertura, 2018 Clausura, 2019 Apertura, 2019 Clausura, 2020 Clausura
