= Emiliano Tellechea =

Uruguayan footballer (born 1987)

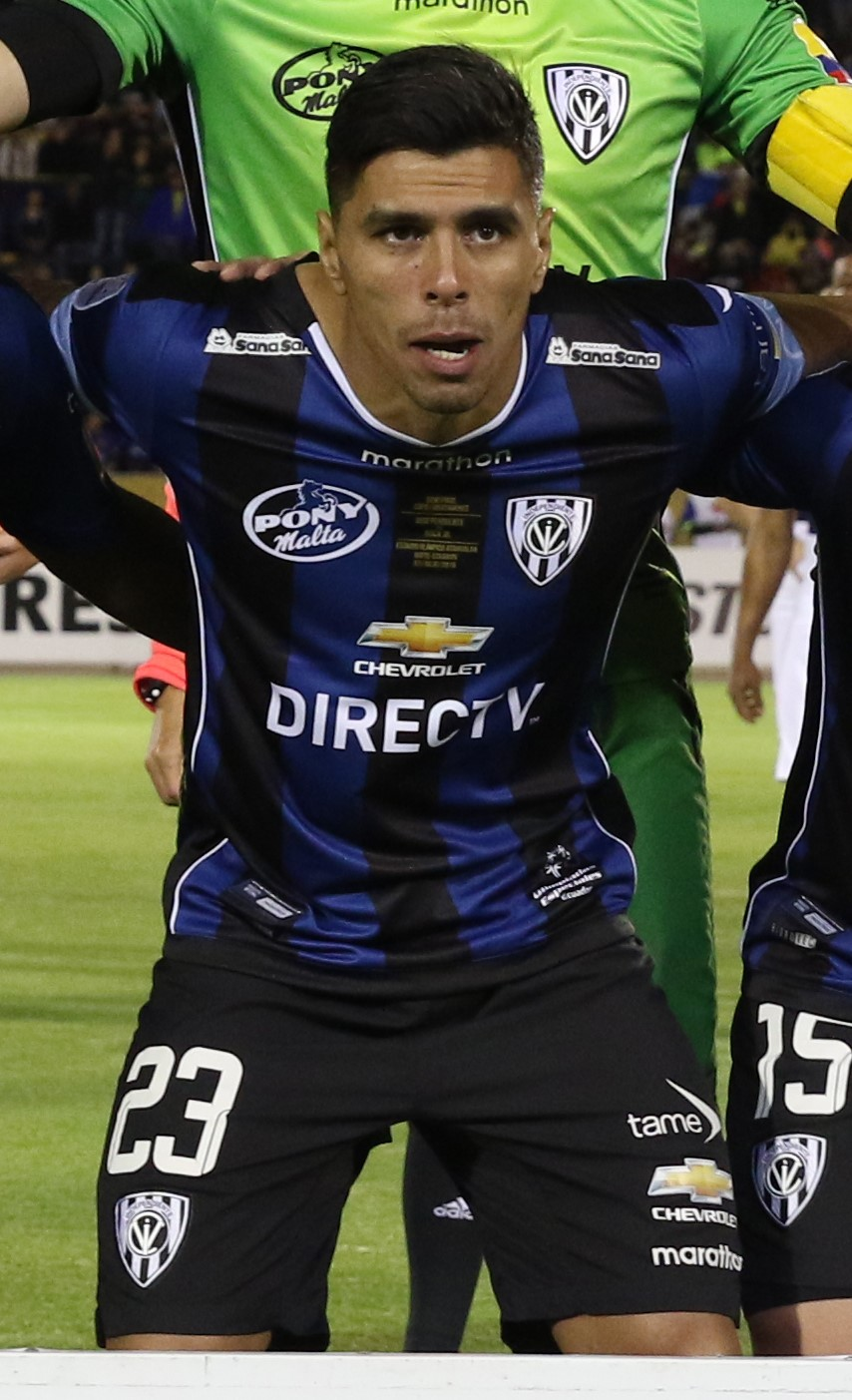

Personal information
- Full name: Emiliano Mathias Tellechea
- Date of birth: 5 July 1987 (age 39)
- Place of birth: Montevideo, Uruguay
- Height: 1.70 m (5 ft 7 in)
- Position: Right winger

Team information
- Current team: Argentino de Monte Maiz

Youth career
- Montevideo Wanderers

Senior career*
Years	Team	Apps	(Gls)
2007–2011	Montevideo Wanderers	104	(15)
2011–2014	San Lorenzo	15	(1)
2013	→ Defensa y Justicia (loan)	19	(1)
2013–2014	→ Instituto (loan)	38	(4)
2014–2016	Defensa y Justicia	28	(4)
2016	Independiente del Valle	16	(2)
2016–2018	Olimpo	46	(5)
2018–2020	Agropecuario	14	(1)
2020–2021	Nueva Chicago	10	(0)
2021–2022	Montevideo Wanderers	40	(0)
2023–	Argentino de Monte Maiz		
- * Club domestic league appearances and goals as of 18:08, 7 August 2022 (UTC)

Emiliano Mathias Tellechea (born 5 July 1987) is a Uruguayan footballer playing for Argentine club Argentino de Monte Maiz.

== Honours ==
Independiente del Valle

- Copa Libertadores runner up: 2016
