= Mario Rizotto =

Uruguayan footballer (born 1984)

Mario Enrique Rizotto Vázquez (born August 30, 1984 in Canelones) is an Uruguayan footballer currently playing for C.D. Técnico Universitario of the Serie A in Ecuador.

== Teams ==
- (Uruguay) Fénix 2006-2008
- (Uruguay) River Plate (Montevideo) 2008-2012
- (Ecuador) Independiente del Valle 2013–2017
- (Ecuador) S.D. Aucas 2018
- (Ecuador) C.S.D. Macará 2019–2020
- (Ecuador) Técnico Universitario 2021–present

== Honours ==
- Copa Libertadores Runner Up (1): 2016
