= 2016 Copa Libertadores =

57th season of Copa Libertadores

2016 Copa Bridgestone Libertadores de América

Tournament details
- Dates: 2 February – 27 July 2016
- Teams: 38 (from 11 associations)

Final positions
- Champions: (Colombia) Atlético Nacional (2nd title)
- Runners-up: (Ecuador) Independiente del Valle

Tournament statistics
- Matches played: 138
- Goals scored: 378 (2.74 per match)
- Top scorer: (Argentina) Jonathan Calleri (9 goals)
- Best player: (Venezuela) Alejandro Guerra

The 2016 Copa Libertadores de América (officially the 2016 Copa Bridgestone Libertadores for sponsorship reasons) was the 57th edition of the Copa Libertadores de América, South America's premier club football tournament organized by CONMEBOL.

In the finals, Colombian club Atlético Nacional defeated Ecuadorian club Independiente del Valle by an aggregate score of 2–1 to win their second tournament title in team history and qualify for the 2016 FIFA Club World Cup in Japan, their first appearance in the FIFA Club World Cup. They also earned the right to play against the winners of the 2016 Copa Sudamericana in the 2017 Recopa Sudamericana. They also automatically qualified for the 2017 Copa Libertadores group stage.

River Plate were the defending champions, but were eliminated by Independiente del Valle in the round of 16.

== Teams ==
The following 38 teams from 11 associations (the 10 CONMEBOL members plus Mexico which were invited to compete) qualified for the tournament:

- Title holders
- Argentina and Brazil: 5 berths each
- All other associations: 3 berths each

The entry stage was determined as follows:

- Second stage: 26 teams (top four teams from Argentina and Brazil, and top two teams from all other associations)
- First stage: 12 teams (team with the lowest berth from each association, plus team with the second lowest berth from association of title holders)

Association	Team (Berth)	Entry stage	Qualification method
(Argentina) Argentina; 5 + 1 berths	River Plate (Argentina 1; Title holders)	Second stage	2015 Copa Libertadores champion
(Argentina) Argentina; 5 + 1 berths	Boca Juniors (Argentina 2)	Second stage	2015 Primera División champion
(Argentina) Argentina; 5 + 1 berths	San Lorenzo (Argentina 3)	Second stage	2015 Primera División runner-up
(Argentina) Argentina; 5 + 1 berths	Rosario Central (Argentina 4)	Second stage	2014–15 Copa Argentina runner-up
(Argentina) Argentina; 5 + 1 berths	Racing (Argentina 5)	First stage	2015 Primera División Liguilla Pre-Libertadores winner
(Argentina) Argentina; 5 + 1 berths	Huracán (Argentina 6)	First stage	2015 Copa Sudamericana best Argentine team not yet qualified
(Bolivia) Bolivia; 3 berths	Bolívar (Bolivia 1)	Second stage	2014 Apertura champion and 2015 Clausura champion
(Bolivia) Bolivia; 3 berths	The Strongest (Bolivia 2)	Second stage	2014–15 Primera División aggregate table best team not yet qualified
(Bolivia) Bolivia; 3 berths	Oriente Petrolero (Bolivia 3)	First stage	2014–15 Primera División aggregate table 2nd best team not yet qualified
(Brazil) Brazil; 5 berths	Corinthians (Brazil 1)	Second stage	2015 Campeonato Brasileiro Série A champion
(Brazil) Brazil; 5 berths	Palmeiras (Brazil 2)	Second stage	2015 Copa do Brasil champion
(Brazil) Brazil; 5 berths	Atlético Mineiro (Brazil 3)	Second stage	2015 Campeonato Brasileiro Série A runner-up
(Brazil) Brazil; 5 berths	Grêmio (Brazil 4)	Second stage	2015 Campeonato Brasileiro Série A 3rd place
(Brazil) Brazil; 5 berths	São Paulo (Brazil 5)	First stage	2015 Campeonato Brasileiro Série A 4th place
(Chile) Chile; 3 berths	Cobresal (Chile 1)	Second stage	2015 Clausura champion
(Chile) Chile; 3 berths	Colo-Colo (Chile 2)	Second stage	2015 Apertura champion
(Chile) Chile; 3 berths	Universidad de Chile (Chile 3)	First stage	2015 Copa Chile champion
(Colombia) Colombia; 3 berths	Deportivo Cali (Colombia 1)	Second stage	2015 Apertura champion
(Colombia) Colombia; 3 berths	Atlético Nacional (Colombia 2)	Second stage	2015 Finalización champion
(Colombia) Colombia; 3 berths	Santa Fe (Colombia 3)	First stage	2015 Copa Sudamericana champion
(Ecuador) Ecuador; 3 berths	Emelec (Ecuador 1)	Second stage	2015 Serie A champion
(Ecuador) Ecuador; 3 berths	LDU Quito (Ecuador 2)	Second stage	2015 Serie A runner-up
(Ecuador) Ecuador; 3 berths	Independiente del Valle (Ecuador 3)	First stage	2015 Serie A aggregate table best team not yet qualified
(Mexico) Mexico; 3 invitees	Pumas UNAM (Mexico 1)	Second stage	2015 Apertura classification table best team not qualified for 2015–16 CONCACAF Champions League
(Mexico) Mexico; 3 invitees	Toluca (Mexico 2)	Second stage	2015 Apertura classification table 2nd best team not qualified for 2015–16 CONCACAF Champions League
(Mexico) Mexico; 3 invitees	Puebla (Mexico 3)	First stage	2015 Supercopa MX champion
(Paraguay) Paraguay; 3 berths	Cerro Porteño (Paraguay 1)	Second stage	2015 tournament (2015 Apertura or 2015 Clausura) champion with better record in aggregate table
(Paraguay) Paraguay; 3 berths	Olimpia (Paraguay 2)	Second stage	2015 tournament (2015 Apertura or 2015 Clausura) champion with worse record in aggregate table
(Paraguay) Paraguay; 3 berths	Guaraní (Paraguay 3)	First stage	2015 Primera División aggregate table best team not yet qualified
(Peru) Peru; 3 berths	Melgar (Peru 1)	Second stage	2015 Descentralizado champion
(Peru) Peru; 3 berths	Sporting Cristal (Peru 2)	Second stage	2015 Descentralizado runner-up
(Peru) Peru; 3 berths	Universidad César Vallejo (Peru 3)	First stage	2015 Descentralizado 3rd place
(Uruguay) Uruguay; 3 berths	Nacional (Uruguay 1)	Second stage	2014–15 Primera División champion
(Uruguay) Uruguay; 3 berths	Peñarol (Uruguay 2)	Second stage	2014–15 Primera División runner-up
(Uruguay) Uruguay; 3 berths	River Plate (Uruguay 3)	First stage	2014–15 Primera División aggregate table best team not yet qualified
(Venezuela) Venezuela; 3 berths	Deportivo Táchira (Venezuela 1)	Second stage	2014–15 Primera División champion
(Venezuela) Venezuela; 3 berths	Trujillanos (Venezuela 2)	Second stage	2014–15 Primera División runner-up
(Venezuela) Venezuela; 3 berths	Caracas (Venezuela 3)	First stage	2014–15 Primera División aggregate table best team not yet qualified

== Draw ==
Location of teams of the 2016 Copa Libertadores from South America.
Location of teams of the 2016 Copa Libertadores from Mexico.

The draw of the tournament was held on 22 December 2015, 20:30 PYST (UTC−3), at the CONMEBOL Convention Centre in Luque, Paraguay.

Starting from this season, teams were seeded by the newly established CONMEBOL ranking of the Copa Libertadores (except for teams from Mexico which were not ranked and thus seeded last in all draws), taking into account of the following three factors:

1. Performance in the last 10 years, taking into account Copa Libertadores results in the period 2006–2015
2. Historical coefficient, taking into account Copa Libertadores results in the period 1960–2005
3. Local tournament champion, with bonus points awarded to domestic league champions of the last 10 years

For the first stage, the 12 teams were drawn into six ties containing a team from Pot A and a team from Pot B, with the former hosting the second leg. The teams were seeded based on their CONMEBOL ranking (shown in parentheses). Teams from the same association could not be drawn into the same tie.

Pots for the first stage draw
Pot A	Pot B
(Brazil) São Paulo (11); Universidad de Chile (17); (Colombia) Santa Fe (22); (Paraguay) Guaraní (29); (Argentina) Racing (39); (Venezuela) Caracas (43)	(Bolivia) Oriente Petrolero (64); (Argentina) Huracán (72); (Ecuador) Independiente del Valle (78); (Peru) Universidad César Vallejo (152); (Uruguay) River Plate (no rank); (Mexico) Puebla (no rank)

For the second stage, the 32 teams were drawn into eight groups of four containing a team from each of the four pots. The defending champions (River Plate) were automatically placed first in Pot 1 and allocated to Group 1 for the draw. The remaining teams were seeded based on their CONMEBOL ranking (shown in parentheses). Teams from the same association in Pots 1, 2 and 3 could not be drawn into the same group. Teams from Mexico were allocated to Pot 4, together with the winners of the first stage, whose identity was not known at the time of the draw, and they could be drawn into the same group with another team from the same association.

Pot 1	Pot 2	Pot 3	Pot 4
(Argentina) River Plate (2); (Argentina) Boca Juniors (1); (Uruguay) Peñarol (3); (Uruguay) Nacional (5); (Paraguay) Olimpia (7); (Brazil) Corinthians (9); (Brazil) Atlético Mineiro (13); (Argentina) San Lorenzo (14)	(Brazil) Grêmio (16); (Ecuador) Emelec (18); (Paraguay) Cerro Porteño (19); (Colombia) Atlético Nacional (20); (Bolivia) Bolívar (21); (Chile) Colo-Colo (24); (Brazil) Palmeiras (31); (Bolivia) The Strongest (33)	(Ecuador) LDU Quito (34); (Peru) Sporting Cristal (38); (Colombia) Deportivo Cali (44); (Venezuela) Deportivo Táchira (49); (Argentina) Rosario Central (71); (Peru) Melgar (108); (Chile) Cobresal (123); (Venezuela) Trujillanos (175)	(Mexico) Pumas UNAM (no rank); (Mexico) Toluca (no rank); Winner G1; Winner G2; Winner G3; Winner G4; Winner G5; Winner G6

== Schedule ==
The schedule of the competition was as follows (all dates listed were Wednesdays, but matches could be played on Tuesdays and Thursdays as well). There was a one-month break between the quarterfinals and semifinals due to the Copa América Centenario held in June.

Stage	First leg	Second leg
First stage	3 February	10 February
Second stage	17, 24 February; 2, 9, 16 March; 6, 13, 20 April	
Round of 16	27 April	4 May
Quarterfinals	11, 18 May	18, 25 May
Semifinals	6 July	13 July
Finals	20 July	27 July

Notes

1. ^{†} For matches involving teams from Mexico.

== First stage ==
In the first stage, each tie was played on a home-and-away two-legged basis. If tied on aggregate, the away goals rule would be used. If still tied, extra time would not be played, and the penalty shoot-out would be used to determine the winner (Regulations Article 5.2). The six winners of the first stage advanced to the second stage to join the 26 direct entrants.

Team 1	Agg.	Team 2	1st leg	2nd leg
Oriente Petrolero (Bolivia)	1–6	(Colombia) Santa Fe	1–3	0–3
Huracán (Argentina)	2–2 (a)	(Venezuela) Caracas	1–0	1–2
Puebla (Mexico)	2–3	(Argentina) Racing	2–2	0–1
River Plate (Uruguay)	2–0	Universidad de Chile	2–0	0–0
Independiente del Valle (Ecuador)	2–2 (a)	(Paraguay) Guaraní	1–0	1–2
Universidad César Vallejo (Peru)	1–2	(Brazil) São Paulo	1–1	0–1

== Second stage ==
In the second stage, each group was played on a home-and-away round-robin basis. The teams were ranked according to points (3 points for a win, 1 point for a draw, and 0 points for a loss). If tied on points, the following criteria would be used to determine the ranking: 1. Goal difference; 2. Goals scored; 3. Away goals scored; 4. Drawing of lots (Regulations Article 5.1). The winners and runners-up of each group advanced to the round of 16.

=== Group 1 ===
Pos	Team	Pld	W	D	L	GF	GA	GD	Pts	Qualification	RIV	SAO	STR	TRU
1	(Argentina) River Plate (A)	6	3	2	1	17	7	+10	11	Final stages	—	1–1	6–0	4–3
2	(Brazil) São Paulo (A)	6	2	3	1	11	5	+6	9	Final stages	2–1	—	0–1	6–0
3	(Bolivia) The Strongest	6	2	2	2	6	11	−5	8		1–1	1–1	—	2–1
4	(Venezuela) Trujillanos	6	1	1	4	7	18	−11	4		0–4	1–1	2–1	—

Source: CONMEBOL
(A) Advanced to the round of 16

=== Group 2 ===
Pos	Team	Pld	W	D	L	GF	GA	GD	Pts	Qualification	RCE	NAC	PAL	RPM
1	(Argentina) Rosario Central (A)	6	3	2	1	13	8	+5	11	Final stages	—	1–1	3–3	4–1
2	(Uruguay) Nacional (A)	6	2	3	1	6	6	0	9	Final stages	0–2	—	1–0	0–0
3	(Brazil) Palmeiras	6	2	2	2	12	8	+4	8		2–0	1–2	—	4–0
4	(Uruguay) River Plate	6	0	3	3	6	15	−9	3		1–3	2–2	2–2	—

Source: CONMEBOL
(A) Advanced to the round of 16

=== Group 3 ===
Pos	Team	Pld	W	D	L	GF	GA	GD	Pts	Qualification	BOC	RAC	BOL	CAL
1	(Argentina) Boca Juniors (A)	6	3	3	0	11	4	+7	12	Final stages	—	0–0	3–1	6–2
2	(Argentina) Racing (A)	6	2	3	1	11	7	+4	9	Final stages	0–1	—	4−1	4–2
3	(Bolivia) Bolívar	6	1	3	2	10	10	0	6		1–1	1–1	—	5–0
4	(Colombia) Deportivo Cali	6	0	3	3	7	18	−11	3		0−0	2–2	1–1	—

Source: CONMEBOL
(A) Advanced to the round of 16

=== Group 4 ===
Pos	Team	Pld	W	D	L	GF	GA	GD	Pts	Qualification	ATL	HUR	PEN	CRI
1	(Colombia) Atlético Nacional (A)	6	5	1	0	12	0	+12	16	Final stages	—	0–0	2–0	3–0
2	(Argentina) Huracán (A)	6	2	2	2	7	7	0	8	Final stages	0–2	—	0–0	4–2
3	(Uruguay) Peñarol	6	1	2	3	5	11	−6	5		0–4	0–1	—	4–3
4	(Peru) Sporting Cristal	6	1	1	4	9	15	−6	4		0–1	3–2	1–1	—

Source: CONMEBOL
(A) Advanced to the round of 16

=== Group 5 ===
Pos	Team	Pld	W	D	L	GF	GA	GD	Pts	Qualification	CAM	IDV	CCL	MEL
1	(Brazil) Atlético Mineiro (A)	6	4	1	1	12	4	+8	13	Final stages	—	1−0	3−0	4–0
2	(Ecuador) Independiente del Valle (A)	6	3	2	1	7	4	+3	11	Final stages	3–2	—	1–1	2−0
3	(Chile) Colo-Colo	6	2	3	1	4	5	−1	9		0–0	0–0	—	1−0
4	(Peru) Melgar	6	0	0	6	2	12	−10	0		1–2	0–1	1–2	—

Source: CONMEBOL
(A) Advanced to the round of 16

=== Group 6 ===
Pos	Team	Pld	W	D	L	GF	GA	GD	Pts	Qualification	TOL	GRE	SLA	LDU
1	(Mexico) Toluca (A)	6	4	1	1	9	5	+4	13	Final stages	—	2–0	2–1	2–1
2	(Brazil) Grêmio (A)	6	3	2	1	10	6	+4	11	Final stages	1–0	—	1–1	4–0
3	(Argentina) San Lorenzo	6	0	4	2	5	8	−3	4		1–1	1–1	—	1–1
4	(Ecuador) LDU Quito	6	1	1	4	7	12	−5	4		1–2	2–3	2–0	—

Source: CONMEBOL
(A) Advanced to the round of 16

=== Group 7 ===
Pos	Team	Pld	W	D	L	GF	GA	GD	Pts	Qualification	PUM	TAC	OLI	EME
1	(Mexico) Pumas UNAM (A)	6	5	0	1	17	8	+9	15	Final stages	—	4–1	4–1	4–2
2	(Venezuela) Deportivo Táchira (A)	6	3	0	3	6	11	−5	9	Final stages	2–0	—	2–1	1–0
3	(Paraguay) Olimpia	6	2	1	3	12	12	0	7		0–2	4–0	—	4–2
4	(Ecuador) Emelec	6	1	1	4	10	14	−4	4		2–3	2–0	2–2	—

Source: CONMEBOL
(A) Advanced to the round of 16

=== Group 8 ===
Pos	Team	Pld	W	D	L	GF	GA	GD	Pts	Qualification	COR	CER	ISF	COB
1	(Brazil) Corinthians (A)	6	4	1	1	13	4	+9	13	Final stages	—	2–0	1–0	6–0
2	(Paraguay) Cerro Porteño (A)	6	3	1	2	6	7	−1	10	Final stages	3–2	—	1–0	2–1
3	(Colombia) Santa Fe	6	2	2	2	6	4	+2	8		1–1	0–0	—	3–0
4	(Chile) Cobresal	6	1	0	5	4	14	−10	3		0–1	2–0	1–2	—

Source: CONMEBOL
(A) Advanced to the round of 16

== Final stages ==
In the final stages, the 16 teams played a single-elimination tournament, with the following rules:

- Each tie was played on a home-and-away two-legged basis, with the higher-seeded team hosting the second leg (Regulations Article 3.4). However, CONMEBOL required that the second leg of the finals had to be played in South America, i.e., if there was a finalist from Mexico, they would have to host the first leg regardless of seeding (Regulations Article 3.7b).
- In the round of 16, quarterfinals, and semifinals, if tied on aggregate, the away goals rule would be used. If still tied, extra time would not be played, and the penalty shoot-out would be used to determine the winner (Regulations Article 5.2).
- In the finals, if tied on aggregate, the away goals rule would not be used, and 30 minutes of extra time would be played. If still tied after extra time, the penalty shoot-out would be used to determine the winner (Regulations Article 5.3).
- If there were two semifinalists from the same association, they would have to play each other (Regulations Article 3.6).

=== Seeding ===
The qualified teams were seeded in the final stages according to their results in the second stage, with the group winners seeded 1–8, and the group runners-up seeded 9–16.

Seed	Grp	Team	Pld	W	D	L	GF	GA	GD	Pts
1	4	(Colombia) Atlético Nacional	6	5	1	0	12	0	+12	16
2	7	(Mexico) Pumas UNAM	6	5	0	1	17	8	+9	15
3	8	(Brazil) Corinthians	6	4	1	1	13	4	+9	13
4	5	(Brazil) Atlético Mineiro	6	4	1	1	12	4	+8	13
5	6	(Mexico) Toluca	6	4	1	1	9	5	+4	13
6	3	(Argentina) Boca Juniors	6	3	3	0	11	4	+7	12
7	1	(Argentina) River Plate	6	3	2	1	17	7	+10	11
8	2	(Argentina) Rosario Central	6	3	2	1	13	8	+5	11
9	6	(Brazil) Grêmio	6	3	2	1	10	6	+4	11
10	5	(Ecuador) Independiente del Valle	6	3	2	1	7	4	+3	11
11	8	(Paraguay) Cerro Porteño	6	3	1	2	6	7	−1	10
12	1	(Brazil) São Paulo	6	2	3	1	11	5	+6	9
13	3	(Argentina) Racing	6	2	3	1	11	7	+4	9
14	2	(Uruguay) Nacional	6	2	3	1	6	6	0	9
15	7	(Venezuela) Deportivo Táchira	6	3	0	3	6	11	−5	9
16	4	(Argentina) Huracán	6	2	2	2	7	7	0	8

Source: CONMEBOL
Rules for classification: 1) Higher position in group; 2) Points; 3) Goal difference; 4) Goals scored; 5) Away goals scored; 6) Drawing of lots (Regulations Article 3.3h).

=== Bracket ===
Round of 16
10	(Ecuador) Independiente del Valle	2	0	2
7	(Argentina) River Plate	0	1	1
15	(Venezuela) Deportivo Táchira	1	0	1
2	(Mexico) Pumas UNAM	0	2	2
14	(Uruguay) Nacional (a)	0	2	2
3	(Brazil) Corinthians	0	2	2
11	(Paraguay) Cerro Porteño	1	1	2
6	(Argentina) Boca Juniors	2	3	5
12	(Brazil) São Paulo	4	1	5
5	(Mexico) Toluca	0	3	3
13	(Argentina) Racing	0	1	1
4	(Brazil) Atlético Mineiro	0	2	2
9	(Brazil) Grêmio	0	0	0
8	(Argentina) Rosario Central	1	3	4
16	(Argentina) Huracán	0	2	2
1	(Colombia) Atlético Nacional	0	4	4

Quarterfinals
10	(Ecuador) Independiente del Valle (p)	2	1	3 (5)
2	(Mexico) Pumas UNAM	1	2	3 (3)
14	(Uruguay) Nacional	1	1	2 (3)
6	(Argentina) Boca Juniors (p)	1	1	2 (4)
12	(Brazil) São Paulo (a)	1	1	2
4	(Brazil) Atlético Mineiro	0	2	2
8	(Argentina) Rosario Central	1	1	2
1	(Colombia) Atlético Nacional	0	3	3

Semifinals
10	(Ecuador) Independiente del Valle	2	3	5
6	(Argentina) Boca Juniors	1	2	3
12	(Brazil) São Paulo	0	1	1
1	(Colombia) Atlético Nacional	2	2	4

Finals
10	(Ecuador) Independiente del Valle	1	0	1
1	(Colombia) Atlético Nacional	1	1	2

=== Round of 16 ===
Team 1	Agg.	Team 2	1st leg	2nd leg
Huracán (Argentina)	2–4	(Colombia) Atlético Nacional	0–0	2–4
Deportivo Táchira (Venezuela)	1–2	(Mexico) Pumas UNAM	1–0	0–2
Nacional (Uruguay)	2–2 (a)	(Brazil) Corinthians	0–0	2–2
Racing (Argentina)	1–2	(Brazil) Atlético Mineiro	0–0	1–2
São Paulo (Brazil)	5–3	(Mexico) Toluca	4–0	1–3
Cerro Porteño (Paraguay)	2–5	(Argentina) Boca Juniors	1–2	1–3
Independiente del Valle (Ecuador)	2–1	(Argentina) River Plate	2–0	0–1
Grêmio (Brazil)	0–4	(Argentina) Rosario Central	0–1	0–3

=== Quarterfinals ===
Team 1	Agg.	Team 2	1st leg	2nd leg
Rosario Central (Argentina)	2–3	(Colombia) Atlético Nacional	1–0	1–3
Independiente del Valle (Ecuador)	3–3 (5–3 p)	(Mexico) Pumas UNAM	2–1	1–2
Nacional (Uruguay)	2–2 (3–4 p)	(Argentina) Boca Juniors	1–1	1–1
São Paulo (Brazil)	2–2 (a)	(Brazil) Atlético Mineiro	1–0	1–2

=== Semifinals ===
Team 1	Agg.	Team 2	1st leg	2nd leg
São Paulo (Brazil)	1–4	(Colombia) Atlético Nacional	0–2	1–2
Independiente del Valle (Ecuador)	5–3	(Argentina) Boca Juniors	2–1	3–2

=== Finals ===
The finals were played on a home-and-away two-legged basis, with the higher-seeded team hosting the second leg. If tied on aggregate, the away goals rule would not be used, and 30 minutes of extra time would be played. If still tied after extra time, the penalty shoot-out would be used to determine the winner.

20 July 2016
19:45 UTC−5

Independiente del Valle (Ecuador)	1–1	(Colombia) Atlético Nacional
Mina 86'	Report	Berrío 35'

Estadio Olímpico Atahualpa, Quito
Attendance: 38,500
Referee: Enrique Cáceres (Paraguay)

27 July 2016
19:45 UTC−5

Atlético Nacional (Colombia)	1–0	(Ecuador) Independiente del Valle
Borja 8'	Report

Estadio Atanasio Girardot, Medellín
Attendance: 46,000
Referee: Néstor Pitana (Argentina)

Atlético Nacional won 2–1 on aggregate.

== Statistics ==
=== Top goalscorers ===
Rank	Player	Team	Goals
1	(Argentina) Jonathan Calleri	(Brazil) São Paulo	9
2	(Argentina) Marco Ruben	(Argentina) Rosario Central	8
2	(Argentina) Ismael Sosa	(Mexico) Pumas UNAM	8
4	(Ecuador) José Enrique Angulo	(Ecuador) Independiente del Valle	6
4	(Ecuador) Junior Sornoza	(Ecuador) Independiente del Valle	6
6	(Argentina) Ramón Ábila	(Argentina) Huracán	5
6	(Colombia) Miguel Borja	(Colombia) Atlético Nacional	5
6	(Uruguay) Michael Santos	(Uruguay) River Plate	5
6	(Argentina) Carlos Tévez	(Argentina) Boca Juniors	5
6	(Colombia) Fernando Uribe	(Mexico) Toluca	5

Source: CONMEBOL.com

=== Top assists ===
Rank	Player	Team	Assists
1	(Brazil) Ganso	(Brazil) São Paulo	4
1	(Colombia) Marlos Moreno	(Colombia) Atlético Nacional	4
1	(Venezuela) Jorge Alberto Rojas	(Venezuela) Deportivo Táchira	4
1	(Venezuela) Luis Manuel Seijas	(Colombia) Santa Fe	4
1	(Uruguay) Alejandro Silva	(Paraguay) Olimpia	4
6	(Colombia) Orlando Berrío	(Colombia) Atlético Nacional	3
6	(Uruguay) Matías Britos	(Mexico) Pumas UNAM	3
6	(Mexico) Javier Cortés	(Mexico) Pumas UNAM	3
6	(Argentina) Cristian Espinoza	(Argentina) Huracán	3
6	(São Tomé and Príncipe) Luís Leal	(Paraguay) Cerro Porteño	3
6	(Brazil) Luan	(Brazil) Grêmio	3
6	(Ecuador) Ángel Mena	(Ecuador) Emelec	3
6	(Argentina) Gabriel Mercado	(Argentina) River Plate	3
6	(Brazil) Michel Bastos	(Brazil) São Paulo	3
6	(Colombia) Luis Quiñones	(Mexico) Pumas UNAM	3
6	(Uruguay) Mario Rizotto	(Ecuador) Independiente del Valle	3
6	(Paraguay) Óscar Romero	(Argentina) Racing	3
6	(Colombia) Macnelly Torres	(Colombia) Atlético Nacional	3

Source: CONMEBOL.com

== Prize money dispute ==
In January 2016, several clubs threatened to withdraw from the competition due a disagreement regarding prize money. CONMEBOL had offered a 40% increase on what was given in the 2015 edition but clubs wanted a 150% increase. On 2 February, CONMEBOL announced that the prize money paid to each club was doubled from the previous amount.

== See also ==
- 2016 FIFA Club World Cup
- 2016 Copa Sudamericana
- 2017 Recopa Sudamericana
