= José Enrique Angulo =

Ecuadorian footballer (born 1995)

José Angulo
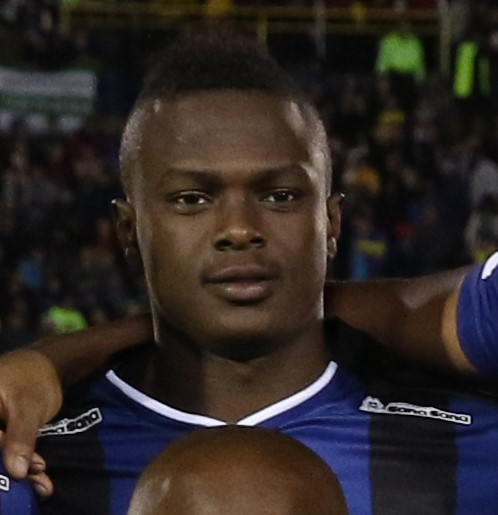

Personal information
- Full name: José Enrique Angulo Caicedo
- Date of birth: 3 February 1995 (age 31)
- Place of birth: San Lorenzo, Ecuador
- Height: 1.81 m (5 ft 11 in)
- Position: Forward

Team information
- Current team: Manta
- Number: 17

Youth career
- 2011: Norte América
- 2011–2015: Independiente DV

Senior career*
Years	Team	Apps	(Gls)
2015–2016	Independiente DV	29	(15)
2016	Granada	0	(0)
2017–2018	Independiente DV	10	(0)
2020–2023	Tijuana	0	(0)
2020	→ Barcelona S.C. (loan)	5	(1)
2021	→ Manta (loan)	14	(8)
2021	→ Independiente DV (loan)	8	(1)
2022	→ Querétaro (loan)	25	(4)
2023	L.D.U. Quito	22	(5)
2024	Delfín	23	(5)
2025	Unión Santa Fe	2	(0)
2025–2026	Emelec	16	(1)
2026–	Manta	3	(0)
- * Club domestic league appearances and goals as of 13 March 2026

José Enrique Angulo Caicedo (born 3 February 1995) is an Ecuadorian footballer who plays as a forward for Ecuadorian Serie A club Manta.

== Club career ==
=== Independiente del Valle ===
Angulo was born in San Lorenzo, Esmeraldas, and joined Independiente del Valle's youth setup in 2011, after starting it out at C.S. Norte América. On 4 September 2015, he made his professional debut, coming on as a late substitute for Bryan Cabezas in a 2–3 away loss against L.D.U. Loja.

Angulo scored his first goals as a professional on 2 October 2015, netting a brace in a 3–1 win at CD River Ecuador. On 6 November, he scored a hat-trick in a 4–1 home routing of Mushuc Runa S.C.; he finished the campaign with an impressive rate of 11 goals in only 14 appearances.

=== Granada ===
On 10 August 2016, Angulo signed a five-year contract with La Liga side Granada CF. On 25 August 2016, just 15 days after signing for the club, he was suspended after testing positive for cocaine.

== Honours ==
Barcelona

- Serie A: 2020

Independiente del Valle

- Serie A: 2021

LDU Quito

- Serie A: 2023
- Copa Sudamericana: 2023
