= Bryan Cabezas =

Ecuadorian footballer (born 1997)

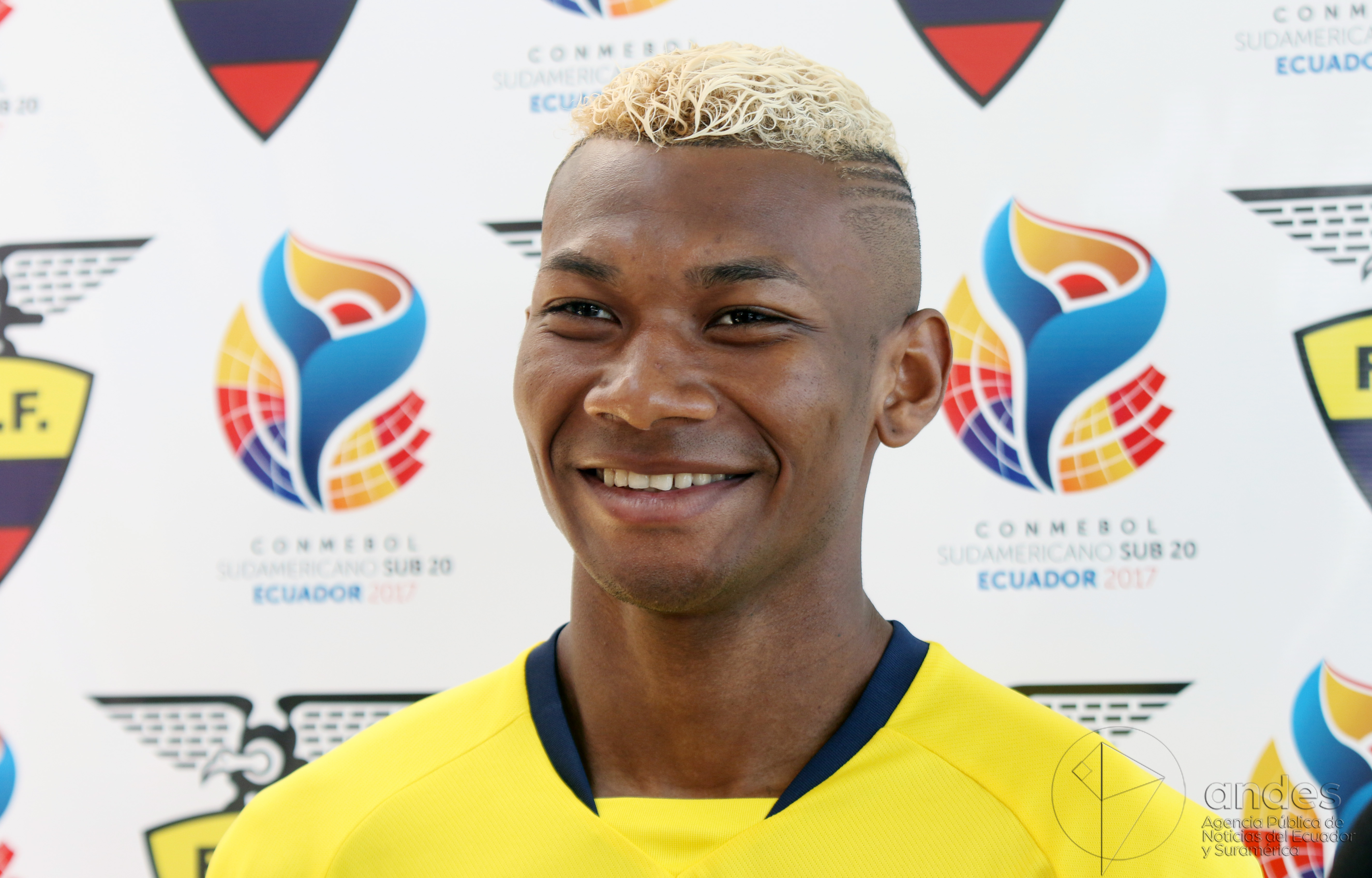

Personal information
- Full name: Bryan Alfredo Cabezas Segura
- Date of birth: 20 March 1997 (age 29)
- Place of birth: Quevedo, Ecuador
- Height: 1.82 m (6 ft 0 in)
- Position: Winger

Team information
- Current team: Universitario de Vinto
- Number: 7

Youth career
- 2009: Segundo Hoyos Jacome
- 2010: CS Norte America
- 2011–2014: Independiente del Valle

Senior career*
Years	Team	Apps	(Gls)
2012–2016	Independiente del Valle	84	(7)
2016–2022	Atalanta	1	(0)
2017–2018	→ Panathinaikos (loan)	9	(0)
2018	→ Avellino (loan)	7	(0)
2018	→ Fluminense (loan)	5	(0)
2019–2021	→ Emelec (loan)	51	(3)
2021–2022	→ Kocaelispor (loan)	4	(0)
2024–2025	Sarmiento	3	(0)
2025	Amazonas	0	(0)
2025–	Universitario de Vinto	10	(0)

International career^{‡}
2016–2017	Ecuador U20	12	(7)
2017	Ecuador	1	(0)
- * Club domestic league appearances and goals as of 30 December 2025 ‡ National team caps and goals as of 00:01, 7 May 2019 (UTC)

Bryan Alfredo Cabezas Segura (born 20 March 1997) is an Ecuadorian footballer who plays for Universitario de Vinto.

== Club career ==
Born in Quevedo, Ecuador, Cabezas began his professional career with Independiente del Valle. He became known internationally for his great performances against River Plate and Boca Juniors.

In August 2016, Italian club Atalanta announced the signing of Cabezas on a five-year contract.

=== Panathinaikos (loan) ===
On 16 July 2017, Cabezas signed a three-year contract with the Greek team Panathinaikos.

On 3 August 2017, Cabezas scored the second goal in the away victory 1–2 against Gabala FK for Europa League 3rd Qualifying Round. Two weeks later, he scored in the home defeat 2–3 against Athletic Bilbao for Europa League play-offs.

On 16 January 2018, only six months after his contract, Cabezas' loan to Panathinaikos was ended early. In his time there, the 20-year-old winger made 14 official performances in all competitions scoring twice in the 2017–18 UEFA Europa League.

=== Fluminense (loan) ===
On 25 July 2018, Cabezas signed to Brazilian club Fluminense a loan with an option to buy.

=== Emelec (loan) ===
On 13 January 2019, Cabezas joined on loan to Ecuadorian club Club Sport Emelec until 30 June 2020.

=== Sarmiento ===
On 12 July 2024, Cabezas returned to professional football join Argentine club Sarmiento on until the end of 2025.

== International career ==
Cabezas was named in Ecuador's senior squad for a 2018 FIFA World Cup qualifier against Brazil in September 2016. He made his debut for Ecuador on 22 February 2017 in a match against Honduras.

== Career statistics ==
As of match played 7 April 2019

Appearances and goals by club, season and competition
Club	Season	League			National Cup		Continental		Total	
Club	Season	Division	Apps	Goals	Apps	Goals	Apps	Goals	Apps	Goals
Independiente del Valle	2013	Primera A	1	0	—		—		1	0
Independiente del Valle	2014	Primera A	6	0	—		0	0	6	0
Independiente del Valle	2015	Primera A	43	3	—		2 (Note: Appearances in the Copa Libertadores)	0	45	3
Independiente del Valle	2016	Primera A	18	1	—		15	3	33	4
Independiente del Valle	Total		68	4	—		17	3	85	7
Atalanta	2016–17	Serie A	1	0	0	0	—		1	0
Atalanta	Total		1	0	0	0	0	0	1	0
Panathinaikos (loan)	2017	Super League Greece	9	0	1	0	4 (Note: Appearances in the Europa League)	2	14	2
Avellino (loan)	2017–18	Serie B	7	0	0	0	—		7	0
Fluminense (loan)	2018	Série A	5	0	0	0	—		5	0
Emelec (loan)	2019	Serie A	5	0	0	0	2	0	7	0
Career total			95	5	1	0	23	5	119	10
