= Enrique Cáceres =

Paraguayan football referee

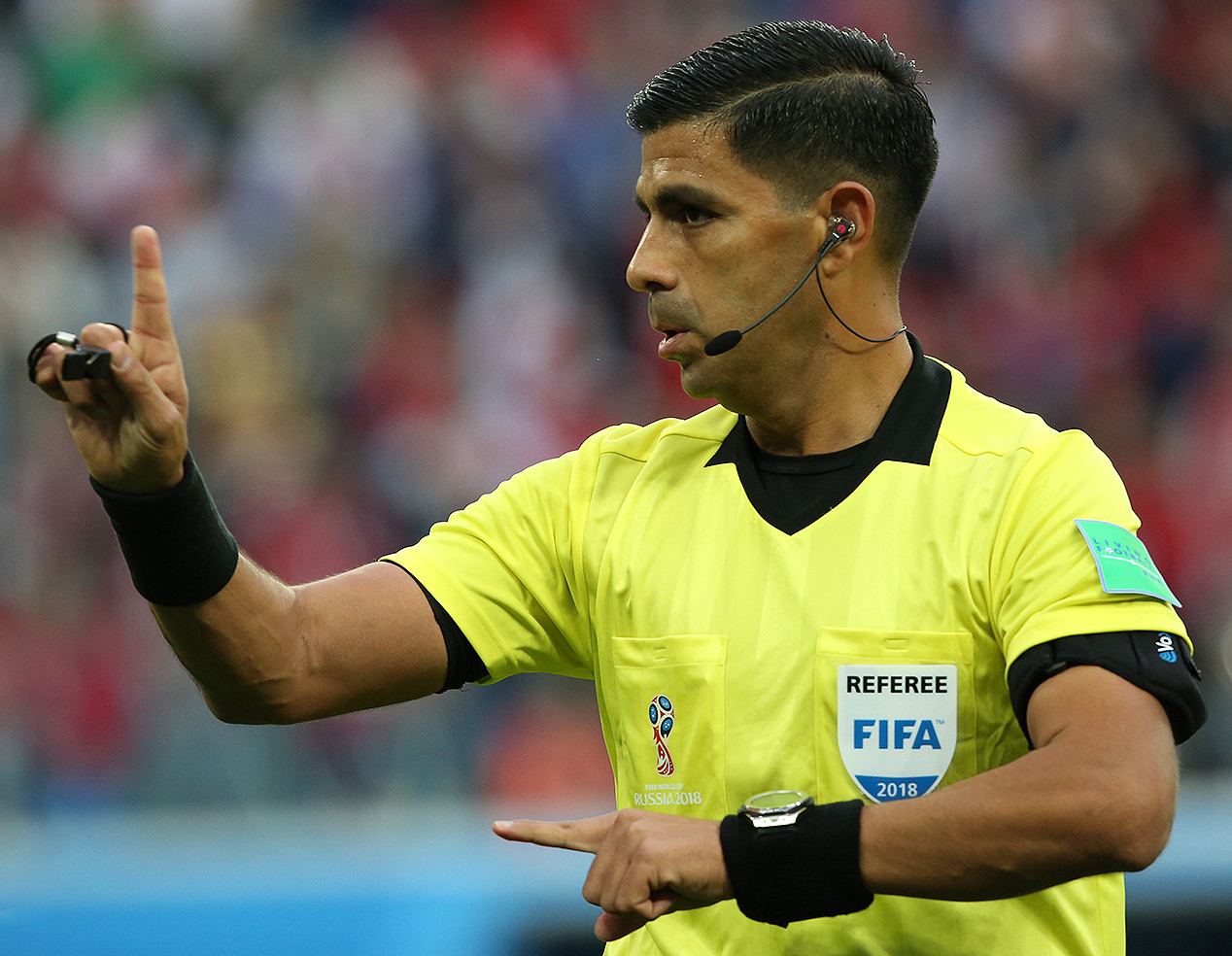
- Cáceres at Saint Petersburg in 2018
- Full name: Enrique Patricio Cáceres Villafañe
- Born: 20 March 1974 (age 52); Paraguay

Domestic
Years	League	Role
2009–present	Paraguayan Primera División	Referee

International
Years	League	Role
2010–2018	FIFA listed	Referee

Enrique Patricio Cáceres Villafañe (Spanish pronunciation: [enˈrike paˈtɾisjo ˈkaseɾes βiʎaˈfaɲe]). Born 20 March 1974) is an international football referee from Paraguay. He has been a FIFA listed referee since 2010 and has taken charge of a number of major matches in Copa Libertadores and Copa América. He refereed his first international match, a friendly between Cuba and Bolivia, in 2012 where he awarded four yellow cards and one red Cáceres has also refereed matches in FIFA Club World Cup and FIFA U-20 World Cup at the international level. During international matches, he is assisted by countrymen Eduardo Cardozo and Juan Zorrilla. Cáceres regularly referees matches in the Paraguayan Primera División. He has refereed over 200 matches.

First appointed to the FIFA Referees Commission in 2021, Cáceres remains a representative as of August 2024. He was appointed President of the CONMEBOL Referees Commission in 2022. Previously, he had been serving as the VAR Technical Manager for CONMEBOL.

== FIFA World Cup ==
2018 FIFA World Cup – Russia
Date	Match	Venue	Round
19 June 2018	Russia – Egypt	Saint Petersburg	Group stage
25 June 2018	Iran – Portugal	Saransk	Group stage
