= 2016–17 Club Atlético Boca Juniors season =

Boca Juniors
2016–17 season
- President: (Argentina) Daniel Angelici
- Manager: (Argentina) Guillermo Barros Schelotto
- Stadium: Estadio Alberto J. Armando (La Bombonera)
- Primera División: Winners
- Copa Argentina: Quarterfinals
- Copa Libertadores: Semifinals
- Top goalscorer: League: Darío Benedetto (21); All: Darío Benedetto (23)
- Average home league attendance: 45,000
Home colours	Away colours	Third colours

The 2016–17 Club Atlético Boca Juniors season is the 88th consecutive Primera División season for the senior squad. During the season, Boca Juniors will take part in the Primera División, Copa Argentina and in the Semifinals of the Copa Libertadores.

== Season overview ==
=== June ===
In the first days of June, 3 players arrived to the club: Fernando Zuqui, from Godoy Cruz, in the transfer it was included money for Guillermo Pol Fernández; Darío Benedetto, from Club América; and Walter Bou, who was loaned from Gimnasia y Esgrima (LP). Also, Lisandro Magallán and Gonzalo Castellani returned from their loans in Defensa y Justicia and Lanús. Additionally, Alexis Rolín left the club. After 7 years and more than 150 games in the club, Cristian Erbes left Boca to play in Mexican team Veracruz. The season started with a 4–0 win over Güemes in the Round of 64 of the Copa Argentina.

=== July ===
Santiago Vergini signed with Boca despite that the medical check wasn't good. Nicolas Benegas is loaned to Quilmes. Boca lost their first match of Copa Libertadores, in the Semifinals, 2–1 against Independiente del Valle; and in the second leg, Boca lost again, in an incredible match 3-2 and it was eliminated in the Semifinals. Fernando Tobio returned to Palmeiras. Andrés Chávez is loaned to São Paulo. Daniel Díaz is transferred to Getafe CF. Nicolás Lodeiro is transferred to Seattle Sounders FC. César Meli signed for Sporting CP on a one-year loan. Talleres (C) made use of the option to purchase Juan Cruz Komar permanently.

=== August ===
Sebastián Palacios is transferred to Talleres (C). Also, 4 more players arrived to the club: Sebastián Pérez, from Atlético Nacional; Axel Werner, who was loaned from Atlético Madrid; Ricardo Centurión, who was loaned from São Paulo and Fernando Tobio, who was loaned again from Palmeiras. After 5 years and more than 200 games, Agustín Orión left the club to play in Racing Club. On August 23 Boca won 2–1 over Santamarina in the Round of 32 of the Copa Argentina. Wílmar Barrios and Nazareno Solís are transferred from Deportes Tolima and Talleres (C). The new players were publicly introduced in the last days of August. At the start of the Primera División tournament Boca played against Lanús losing 1–0. Franco Cristaldo is loaned to Rayo Vallecano.

=== September ===
Leandro Marín is loaned to Arsenal. Nicolás Colazo is loaned to Australian team Melbourne City. The first match of September was a 3–0 victory over Belgrano. After that a 1–1 draw against Godoy Cruz and a 4–1 win vs Quilmes with a hat-trick of Darío Benedetto. Boca advanced to the Quarterfinals of Copa Argentina after the victory over Lanús in the penalty shoot-out.

=== October ===
The month started with a 1–1 draw against Tigre and a 2–0 victory over Sarmiento. Gonzalo Castellani is loaned to Defensa y Justicia. Boca played in Tucumán against Atlético Tucumán achieving a 2–2 draw. After that a 4–0 win over Temperley.

=== November ===
Boca lost against Rosario Central in the Quarterfinals of Copa Argentina; Boca will not play any CONMEBOL tournaments in 2017. Boca won the first match away, 3–0 in La Plata against Gimnasia y Esgrima (LP). On November 11 in Spain, Boca won the Antonio Puerta Trophy 4–3 against Sevilla. D.C. United acquires Luciano Acosta on a permanent transfer after the expiration of his one-year loan. Boca couldn't won against Rosario Central in the local tournament, it was a 1–1 draw. Boca won the derby against San Lorenzo, after several months Fernando Gago returned to the first team.

=== December ===
In the first match of December, Boca got a great win 4–2 over Racing Club; and 4–2 against River Plate in the Superclásico. In the last match of 2016 Boca won 4–1 against Colón. After a lot of rumors finally was confirmed that the last idol of the club, Carlos Tevez is transferred to Shanghai Shenhua of China.

=== January ===
Adrián Cubas signed for Pescara on a six-month loan. After a 2–0 victory over Estudiantes (LP) in Mar del Plata, and a 2–2 draw against San Lorenzo Boca was crowned championship of the Copa de Oro. On the last friendly Superclasico, River Plate defeated Boca 2–0, the match was played in Mar del Plata. César Meli is transferred to Racing Club.

=== February ===
On February 2 Boca lost 5–3 in penalties after a 1–1 draw in a friendly against Chivas de Guadalajara in Jalisco. Oscar Benítez is loaned to Boca from Benfica on an 18-month loan and the goalkeeper Agustín Rossi is transferred from Estudiantes (LP). On February 11 Boca lost 3–1 against Aldosivi. Federico Carrizo is transferred to Rosario Central. The last friendly of the summer was a 2–1 victory over Colón.

=== March ===
In the long-awaited return of the tournament Boca beat Banfield 2–0. And then suffered the first defeat in La Bombonera against Talleres (C). After that loss Boca won a difficult game 2–1 in San Juan against San Martín.

=== April ===
In the first game of April Boca win 1–0 against Defensa y Justicia. And then, a 3–1 win over Vélez Sarsfield, keeping Boca in the first place of the table. But a 1–1 draw against Patronato and a 0–0 draw against Atlético de Rafaela made Boca lose 4 important points. In the last match of April Boca won 3–0 over Arsenal.

=== May ===
Boca started May with a 0–0 draw against Estudiantes (LP). In the second Superclasico Boca played very badly and lost 3–1; but then Boca won 1–0 over Newell's Old Boys and drew 1–1 against Huracán.

=== June ===
Boca, showing great football won 3-0 the derbi over Independiente, and after that a 4–0 win over Aldosivi. On June 20, San Lorenzo won 1–0 over Banfield, the only team with chances to reach Boca at the top, so that Boca became the champion of 2016–17 Primera División. In the last away match Boca drew 2–2 against Olimpo. In the last match of the tournament Boca won 2–1 over Unión. With 21 goals Darío Benedetto finished as the tournament goalscorer.

== Squad ==
Last updated on June 25, 2017

Squad No.	Name	Nationality	Position	Date of birth (age)	Apps	Goals	Signed from	Note
Goalkeepers
1	Guillermo Sara	(Argentina)	GK	September 30, 1987 (age 39)	34	-32	(Spain) Real Betis	
12	Agustín Rossi	(Argentina)	GK	August 21, 1995 (age 31)	16	-12	(Argentina) Defensa y Justicia	
23	Ramiro Martínez	(Argentina)	GK	April 18, 1991 (age 35)	0	0	(Argentina) Academy	
28	Axel Werner	(Argentina)	GK	February 28, 1996 (age 30)	2	-3	(Spain) Atlético Madrid	
Defenders
2	Fernando Tobio	(Argentina)	DF	October 18, 1989 (age 36)	50	0	(Brazil) Palmeiras	
3	Jonathan Silva	(Argentina)	DF	June 29, 1994 (age 32)	36	2	(Portugal) Sporting CP	
4	Gino Peruzzi	(Argentina)	DF	June 9, 1992 (age 34)	68	4	(Italy) Catania	
6	Lisandro Magallán	(Argentina)	DF	September 27, 1993 (age 33)	24	1	(Argentina) Defensa y Justicia	
18	Frank Fabra	(Colombia)	DF	February 22, 1991 (age 35)	34	3	(Colombia) Independiente Medellín	
25	Juan Manuel Insaurralde	(Argentina)	DF	October 3, 1984 (age 42)	125	8	(Mexico) Chiapas	Injured
27	Santiago Vergini	(Argentina)	DF	August 3, 1988 (age 38)	31	0	(England) Sunderland	
35	Nahuel Molina Lucero	(Argentina)	DF	April 6, 1998 (age 28)	9	0	(Argentina) Academy	
Midfielders
5	Fernando Gago (C)	(Argentina)	MF	April 10, 1986 (age 40)	176	8	(Spain) Valencia	
8	Pablo Pérez (VC 2º)	(Argentina)	MF	August 10, 1985 (age 41)	79	6	(Spain) Málaga	
10	Ricardo Centurión	(Argentina)	MF	January 19, 1993 (age 33)	24	8	(Brazil) São Paulo	
14	Sebastián Pérez Cardona	(Colombia)	MF	March 29, 1993 (age 33)	12	0	(Colombia) Atlético Nacional	Injured
15	Fernando Zuqui	(Argentina)	MF	November 25, 1991 (age 34)	17	0	(Argentina) Godoy Cruz	
16	Wílmar Barrios	(Colombia)	MF	October 16, 1993 (age 32)	21	0	(Colombia) Deportes Tolima	
20	Gonzalo Maroni	(Argentina)	MF	March 18, 1999 (age 27)	3	1	(Argentina) Academy	
29	Leonardo Jara	(Argentina)	MF	May 20, 1991 (age 35)	36	1	(Argentina) Estudiantes (LP)	
30	Rodrigo Bentancur	(Uruguay)	MF	June 5, 1997 (age 29)	65	1	(Argentina) Academy	
40	Julián Chicco	(Argentina)	MF	January 13, 1998 (age 28)	3	0	(Argentina) Academy	
Forwards
7	Cristian Pavón	(Argentina)	FW	January 21, 1996 (age 30)	54	18	(Argentina) Colón	
9	Darío Benedetto	(Argentina)	FW	May 17, 1990 (age 36)	30	23	(Mexico) América	
17	Nazareno Solís	(Argentina)	FW	April 22, 1994 (age 32)	4	0	(Argentina) Talleres (C)	
19	Walter Bou	(Argentina)	FW	August 25, 1993 (age 33)	27	6	(Argentina) Gimnasia y Esgrima (LP)	
22	Oscar Benítez	(Argentina)	FW	January 14, 1993 (age 33)	9	2	(Portugal) Benfica	
26	Marcelo Torres	(Argentina)	FW	January 18, 1998 (age 28)	0	0	(Argentina) Academy	

== Transfers ==
=== Winter ===
Players transferred in
Date	Pos.	Name	Club	Fee
3 June 2016	MF	(Argentina) Fernando Zuqui	(Argentina) Godoy Cruz	Undisclosed
7 June 2016	FW	(Argentina) Darío Benedetto	(Mexico) América	Undisclosed
4 July 2016	FW	(Argentina) Santiago Vergini	(England) Sunderland	Undisclosed
15 August 2016	MF	(Colombia) Sebastián Pérez Cardona	(Colombia) Atlético Nacional	Undisclosed
26 August 2016	MF	(Colombia) Wílmar Barrios	(Colombia) Deportes Tolima	Undisclosed
26 August 2016	FW	(Argentina) Nazareno Solís	(Argentina) Talleres (C)	Free
Players transferred out
Date	Pos.	Name	Club	Fee
3 June 2016	MF	(Argentina) Guillermo Fernández	(Argentina) Godoy Cruz	Undisclosed
28 June 2016	MF	(Argentina) Cristian Erbes	(Mexico) Veracruz	Free
23 July 2016	DF	(Argentina) Daniel Díaz	(Spain) Getafe CF	Free
27 July 2016	MF	(Uruguay) Nicolás Lodeiro	(United States) Seattle Sounders FC	Undisclosed
30 July 2016	DF	(Argentina) Juan Cruz Komar	(Argentina) Talleres (C)	Undisclosed
2 August 2016	FW	(Argentina) Sebastián Palacios	(Argentina) Talleres (C)	Undisclosed
19 August 2016	GK	(Argentina) Agustín Orión	(Argentina) Racing Club	Free
15 November 2016	MF	(Argentina) Luciano Acosta	(United States) D.C. United	Undisclosed
Players loaned in
Start date	Pos.	Name	Club	End date
3 June 2016	FW	(Argentina) Walter Bou	(Argentina) Gimnasia y Esgrima (LP)	June 2017
? August 2016	MF	(Argentina) Ricardo Centurión	(Brazil) São Paulo	June 2017
? August 2016	DF	(Argentina) Fernando Tobio	(Brazil) Palmeiras	June 2017
20 August 2016	GK	(Argentina) Axel Werner	(Spain) Atlético Madrid	June 2017
Players loaned out
Start date	Pos.	Name	Club	End date
6 July 2016	FW	(Argentina) Nicolas Benegas	(Argentina) Quilmes	June 2017
19 July 2016	FW	(Argentina) Andrés Chávez	(Brazil) São Paulo	June 2017
30 July 2016	MF	(Argentina) César Meli	(Portugal) Sporting CP	June 2017
31 August 2016	MF	(Argentina) Franco Cristaldo	(Spain) Rayo Vallecano	June 2017
5 September 2016	MF	(Argentina) Nicolás Colazo	(Australia) Melbourne City FC	June 2017
7 September 2016	DF	(Argentina) Leandro Marín	(Argentina) Arsenal	June 2017
17 October 2016	DF	(Argentina) Gonzalo Castellani	(Argentina) Defensa y Justicia	?
Loan Return
Date	Pos.	Name	Return to	Return from
June 2016	DF	(Argentina) Lisandro Magallán	(Argentina) Boca Juniors	(Argentina) Defensa y Justicia
June 2016	MF	(Argentina) Gonzalo Castellani	(Argentina) Boca Juniors	(Argentina) Lanús
June 2016	DF	(Argentina) Leandro Marín	(Argentina) Boca Juniors	(Argentina) Tigre
June 2016	MF	(Argentina) Franco Cristaldo	(Argentina) Boca Juniors	(Spain) Elche
June 2016	MF	(Uruguay) Alexis Rolín	(Italy) Catania	(Argentina) Boca Juniors
July 2016	MF	(Argentina) Fernando Tobio	(Brazil) Palmeiras	(Argentina) Boca Juniors

=== Summer ===
Players transferred in
Date	Pos.	Name	Club	Fee
2 February 2017	GK	(Argentina) Agustín Rossi	(Argentina) Defensa y Justicia	$1.400.000
Players transferred out
Date	Pos.	Name	Club	Fee
29 December 2016	FW	(Argentina) Carlos Tevez	(China) Shanghai Shenhua	$12.000.000
31 January 2017	MF	(Argentina) César Meli	(Argentina) Racing Club	Undisclosed
23 February 2017	MF	(Argentina) Federico Carrizo	(Argentina) Rosario Central	$700.000
Players loaned in
Start date	Pos.	Name	Club	End date
2 February 2017	FW	(Argentina) Oscar Benítez	(Portugal) Benfica	June 2018
Players loaned out
Start date	Pos.	Name	Club	End date
10 January 2017	MF	(Argentina) Adrián Cubas	(Italy) Pescara	June 2017
Loan Return
Date	Pos.	Name	Return to	Return from

== Pre-season and friendlies ==
=== Winter ===
Win Draw Loss Postponed

June 23, 2016 Pre-season	Boca Juniors (Argentina)	2–0	(Paraguay) Olimpia	Salta, Argentina
21:00	Díaz 19'; Zuqui (yellow card) 31'; Cubas (yellow card) 32'; Chávez 87'		Riveros (yellow card) 17'; Mencia (yellow card) 42'	Stadium: Estadio Padre Ernesto Martearena; Referee: Silvio Trucco (Argentina)

July 23, 2016 Pre-season	Boca Juniors (Argentina)	1–1	(Uruguay) Danubio	Buenos Aires, Argentina
	Pavón		Graví	Stadium: La Bombonera

July 23, 2016 Pre-season	Boca Juniors (Argentina)	3–0	(Uruguay) Danubio	Buenos Aires, Argentina
	Carrizo; Palacios			Stadium: La Bombonera

July 29, 2016 Pre-season	Boca Juniors	4–1	Defensa y Justicia	Buenos Aires, Argentina
	Pavón; Benedetto; Tevez		Elizari	Stadium: La Bombonera

July 29, 2016 Pre-season	Boca Juniors	0–2	Defensa y Justicia	Buenos Aires, Argentina
			Stefanelli; Bouzat	Stadium: La Bombonera

August 14, 2016 Pre-season	Boca Juniors	2–0	San Lorenzo	La Plata, Argentina
19:00	Carrizo 23'; Pérez 34'			Stadium: Ciudad de La Plata

September 3, 2016 Mid-season	Boca Juniors (Argentina)	2–0	(Paraguay) Libertad	Resistencia, Argentina
20:00	Tevez 36'; Bou 52'			Stadium: Estadio Centenario

October 9, 2016 Mid-season	Boca Juniors (Argentina)	2–2	(Paraguay) Olimpia	Jujuy, Argentina
20:00	Benedetto 7'; Bou 90+1' (pen.)		Benítez 4'; Mendieta 38'	Stadium: Estadio 23 de Agosto
Note: The match was suspended after Olimpia abandoned the match in the last minute before the penalty shoot-out.

November 11, 2016 Antonio Puerta Trophy	Sevilla (Spain)	3–4	(Argentina) Boca Juniors	Seville, Spain
16:45	Nzonzi 30'; Kolodziejczak 84'; Vietto 88'		Benedetto 24'; Pavón 38'; Tevez 59', 90+4'	Stadium: Ramón Sánchez Pizjuán; Referee: David Fernández Borbalán

=== Summer ===
January 21, 2017 Copa de Oro	Boca Juniors	2–0	Estudiantes (LP)	Mar del Plata, Argentina
22:10	Diarte 13' (o.g.); Bou 26'; Pérez (yellow card) 50'	Report	Umeres (yellow card) 60' (yellow-red card) 67'; Ahumada Acuña (yellow card) 83'	Stadium: Estadio José María Minella; Referee: Federico Beligoy

January 24, 2017 Copa de Oro	Boca Juniors	2–2	San Lorenzo	Mar del Plata, Argentina
22:10	Gago 9' (pen.); Benedetto (yellow card) 34'; Bou 65'; Carrizo (yellow card) 72'; Vergini (red card) 90'	Report	Ortigoza (yellow card) 1'; Mussis (yellow card) 18'; Montoya (yellow card) 27'; Blandi 65'; Merlini 65'; Marcos Senesi (yellow card) 74'	Stadium: Estadio José María Minella; Referee: Mauro Vigliano

January 28, 2017 Copa Luis B. Nofal	River Plate	2–0	Boca Juniors	Mar del Plata, Argentina
22:10	Mayada (yellow card) 18'; Maidana (yellow card) 20'; Montiel (yellow card) 31'; Mina (yellow card) 54' (goal) 69'; Driussi 62' (red card) 80'; Palacios (yellow card) 76'	Report	Pérez (yellow card) 5'; Benedetto (yellow card) 58' (yellow-red card) 82'; Gago (yellow card) 70'; Insaurralde (red card) 80'	Stadium: Estadio José María Minella; Referee: Néstor Pitana

February 2, 2016 Duelo de Gigantes	Guadalajara (Mexico)	1–1 (5–3 p)	(Argentina) Boca Juniors	Jalisco, Mexico
23:30	Hernández (yellow card) 55'; Pulido 74'	Report	Peruzzi (yellow card) 58'; Bou 67'; Pérez (yellow card) 69'; Barrios (yellow card) 87'	Stadium: Ramón Sánchez Pizjuán; Referee: Luis Enrique Santander
	Penalties
	Alanís (penalty scored); Zaldívar (penalty scored); Pineda (penalty scored); Pizarro (penalty scored); Fierro (penalty scored)		(penalty scored) Pavón; (penalty missed) Vergini; (penalty scored) Pérez; (penalty scored) Gago

February 11, 2017 Friendly	Aldosivi	3–1	Boca Juniors	Mar del Plata, Argentina
20:00	Llama 7'; Alegre (yellow card) 15'; Penco (yellow card) 30'; Galván 49'; Sosa (yellow card) 57'; Castro 59'		Pérez (yellow card) 48'; Benítez 74'; Gago (yellow card) 89'	Stadium: Estadio José María Minella; Referee: Fernando Rapallini

February 25, 2017 Friendly	Colón	1–2	Boca Juniors	Santa Fe, Argentina
21:30	Blanco (penalty missed) 26'; Leguizamón 26'		Tobio 45+1'; Bou 78'	Stadium: Estadio B.G. Estanislao López; Referee: Germán Delfino

== Competitions ==
=== Overall ===
Competition	Started round	Final position/round	First match	Last match
Primera División	–	Winners	28 August 2016	25 June 2017
Copa Argentina	Round of 64	Quarterfinals	29 June 2016	2 November 2016
Copa Libertadores	Semifinals^{1}	Semifinals	7 July 2016	14 July 2016

1: There is a one-month break between the quarterfinals and semifinals due to the Copa América Centenario held in June, so the Second Stage, Round of 16 and Quarterfinals belong to the previous season.

=== Overview ===
Competition	Record							
Competition	Pld	W	D	L	GF	GA	GD	Win %
Primera División	30	18	9	3	62	25	+37	60.00
Copa Argentina	4	2	1	1	9	5	+4	50.00
Copa Libertadores	2	0	0	2	3	5	−2	0.00
Total	36	20	10	6	74	35	+39	55.56

Last updated: June 25, 2017
Source: Competitions

=== Primera División ===
==== League table ====
Pos	Team	Pld	W	D	L	GF	GA	GD	Pts	Qualification
1	Boca Juniors (C)	30	18	9	3	62	25	+37	63	Qualification for Copa Libertadores group stage
2	River Plate	30	16	8	6	51	28	+23	56	Qualification for Copa Libertadores group stage
3	Estudiantes (LP)	30	16	8	6	46	26	+20	56	Qualification for Copa Libertadores group stage
4	Racing	30	17	4	9	51	40	+11	55	Qualification for Copa Libertadores group stage
5	Banfield	30	17	3	10	42	35	+7	54	Qualification for Copa Libertadores second stage

Source: AFA
(C) Champions

==== Relegation table ====
Pos	Team	2014 Pts	2015 Pts	2016 Pts	2016–17 Pts	Total Pts	Total Pld	Avg	Relegation
1	Boca Juniors	31	64	20	63	178	95	1.874	
2	Racing	41	57	24	55	177	95	1.863	
3	San Lorenzo	26	61	34	52	173	94	1.84	

==== Results summary ====
Overall								Home						Away					
Pld	W	D	L	GF	GA	GD	Pts	W	D	L	GF	GA	GD	W	D	L	GF	GA	GD
30	18	9	3	62	25	+37	63	11	2	2	35	12	+23	7	7	1	27	13	+14

Source: AFA

==== Results by round ====
Round	1	2	3	4	5	6	7	8	9	10	11	12	13	14	15	16	17	18	19	20	21	22	23	24	25	26	27	28	29	30
Ground	A	H	A	H	A	H	A	H	A	H	A	H	A	H	A	H	A	H	A	H	A	H	A	H	H	A	H	A	A	H
Result	L	W	D	W	D	W	D	W	W	D	W	W	W	W	W	L	W	W	W	D	D	W	D	L	W	D	W	W	D	W
Position	22	12	12	8	8	4	7	3	2	4	3	2	1	1	1	1	1	1	1	1	1	1	1	1	1	1	1	1	1	1

Source: AFA
A = Away; H = Home; W = Win; D = Draw; L = Loss

==== Matches ====
Win Draw Loss Postponed

August 28, 2016 1	Lanús	1–0	Boca Juniors	Lanús
20:00 UTC−3	Montenegro (penalty missed) 39'; Martínez (yellow card) 65'; Acosta 67'	Report	Bentancur (yellow card) 38'	Stadium: Ciudad de Lanús; Referee: Diego Abal

September 11, 2016 2	Boca Juniors	3–0	Belgrano	Buenos Aires
18:00 UTC−3	Tevez 32' (yellow card) 35' (red card) 35'; Pavón 45+1'; Fabra 83'	Report	Saravia (yellow card) 33'; Lema (yellow card) 45'; Álvarez (yellow card) 54' (yellow-red card) 74'; Álvarez Suárez (yellow card) 86'; Bolatti (yellow card) 88'	Stadium: La Bombonera; Referee: Germán Delfino

September 18, 2016 3	Godoy Cruz	1–1	Boca Juniors	Mendoza
16:00 UTC−3	Fernández (yellow card) 8'; Silva (yellow card) 75'; Correa 82'	Report	Fabra (yellow card) 18'; Peruzzi 71'	Stadium: Malvinas Argentinas; Referee: Patricio Loustau

September 25, 2016 4	Boca Juniors	4–1	Quilmes	Buenos Aires
18:00 UTC−3	Benedetto 6', 17', 24'; Centurión 23'; Tobio (yellow card) 63'	Report	Da Campo 12'; Sarulyte (yellow card) 39'; González (yellow card) 45+1'	Stadium: La Bombonera; Referee: Néstor Pitana

October 2, 2016 5	Tigre	1–1	Boca Juniors	Victoria
20:00 UTC−3	Morales 2' (yellow card) 65'; Urribarri (yellow card) 42'; Luna (yellow card) 90+1'	Report	Pérez (yellow card) 11'; Insaurralde 80'	Stadium: José Dellagiovanna; Referee: Federico Beligoy

October 16, 2016 6	Boca Juniors	2–0	Sarmiento	Buenos Aires
16:00 UTC−3	Pérez (yellow card) 12'; Centurión 32'; Insaurralde (yellow card) 35'; W. Bou 90+3'	Report	Niz (yellow card) 11'	Stadium: La Bombonera; Referee: Fernando Echenique

October 23, 2016 7	Atlético Tucumán	2–2	Boca Juniors	San Miguel de Tucumán
20:00 UTC−3	Zampedri 43'; Cáceres (yellow card) 56' (yellow-red card) 87'; Menéndez 70' (yellow card) 71'	Report	Pavón 3', 46'; Tobio (yellow card) 38'	Stadium: Monumental José Fierro; Referee: Diego Abal

October 29, 2016 8	Boca Juniors	4–0	Temperley	Buenos Aires
16:00 UTC−3	Peruzzi (yellow card) 4' (goal) 8'; Pavón 10'; Aguirre 23' (o.g.); W. Bou 65'	Report	Bogino (yellow card) 25'; Aguirre (yellow card) 53'; Zárate (yellow card) 74'; Arregui (yellow card) 81'	Stadium: La Bombonera; Referee: Saúl Laverni

November 6, 2016 9	Gimnasia y Esgrima (LP)	0–3	Boca Juniors	La Plata
20:00 UTC−3	Licht (yellow card) 7'; Romero (yellow card) 7'; Carrera (red card) 31'; Coronel (yellow card) 36'; Bottinelli (yellow card) 88'	Report	Benedetto 31', 35'; Pavón 42'; Zuqui (yellow card) 47'	Stadium: Juan Carmelo Zerillo; Referee: Jorge Baliño

November 20, 2016 10	Boca Juniors	1–1	Rosario Central	Buenos Aires
18:30 UTC−3	Benedetto 10'; Centurión (red card) 21'; Vergini (yellow card) 45+2'; Pérez Cardona (yellow card) 89'	Report	Fernández (yellow card) 13'; Gutiérrez 16' (red card) 21'; Martínez (yellow card) 28'; Torsiglieri (yellow card) 67'; Ferrari (yellow card) 72'; Villagra (yellow card) 82'; Camacho (yellow card) 90+1'	Stadium: La Bombonera; Referee: Darío Herrera

November 27, 2016 11	San Lorenzo	1–2	Boca Juniors	Buenos Aires
18:30 UTC−3	Belluschi 45+2'	Report	Insaurralde (yellow card) 14'; Benedetto 20'; W. Bou 25'; Fabra (yellow card) 39'; Vergini (yellow card) 56'; Sara (yellow card) 77'	Stadium: Pedro Bidegain; Referee: Fernando Espinoza

December 4, 2016 12	Boca Juniors	4–2	Racing Club	Buenos Aires
18:00 UTC−3	Insúa 23' (o.g.); W. Bou 40', 47'; Gago (yellow card) 78'; Tevez 79'	Report	López 49', 73'; Cerro (yellow card) 60'; G. Bou (yellow card) 76'	Stadium: La Bombonera; Referee: Patricio Loustau

December 11, 2016 13	River Plate	2–4	Boca Juniors	Buenos Aires
17:00 UTC−3	Driussi 33' (yellow card) 34'; Alario 39' (yellow card) 88'; Maidana (yellow card) 53'; Mora (yellow card) 71'	Report	W. Bou 13'; Pérez (yellow card) 18'; Gago (yellow card) 60'; Tevez 61', 80'; Centurión 90+3' (yellow card) 90+4'	Stadium: Monumental Antonio Vespucio Liberti; Referee: Diego Abal

December 18, 2016 14	Boca Juniors	4–1	Colón	Buenos Aires
18:30 UTC−3	Vergini (yellow card) 6'; Centurión 9', 61'; Tevez 29'; Pavón (yellow card) 33' (goal) 77'	Report	Olivera (yellow card) 13'; Leguizamón 22'; Ceballos (yellow card) 37'; Ortiz (yellow card) 85'	Stadium: La Bombonera; Referee: Saúl Laverni

March 11, 2017 15	Banfield	0–2	Boca Juniors	Banfield
18:30 UTC−3	Remedi (yellow card) 78'	Report	Gago (yellow card) 2'; Benedetto 15', 63'; Insaurralde (yellow card) 35'; Pérez Cardona (red card) 90+2'	Stadium: Florencio Solá; Referee: Darío Herrera

March 19, 2017 16	Boca Juniors	1–2	Talleres (C)	Buenos Aires
19:30 UTC−3	Benítez 24'; Pérez (yellow card) 38'	Report	Reynoso (yellow card) 38' (goal) 81'; Ramis 45'; Palacios (yellow card) 67'	Stadium: La Bombonera; Referee: Ariel Penel

March 26, 2017 17	San Martín (SJ)	1–2	Boca Juniors	San Juan
16:30 UTC−3	Matricardi (yellow card) 9'; Dening (yellow card) 25' (goal) 87'; Ardente (yellow card) 27'; Villarruel (yellow card) 28'; Casierra (yellow card) 53'	Report	Pavón 26'; Centurión 55'; Bentancur (yellow card) 58'; Peruzzi (yellow card) 59'	Stadium: Ingeniero Hilario Sánchez; Referee: Fernando Espinoza

April 1, 2017 18	Boca Juniors	1–0	Defensa y Justicia	Buenos Aires
20:00 UTC−3	Pérez Cardona (yellow card) 32'; Peruzzi (yellow card) 37'; Benedetto (yellow card) 46' (goal) 72'	Report	Silva (yellow card) 80'; Miranda (yellow card) 86'; Bareiro (yellow card) 89'	Stadium: La Bombonera; Referee: Juan Pablo Pompei

April 9, 2017 19	Vélez Sarsfield	1–3	Boca Juniors	Buenos Aires
20:15 UTC−3	Desábato (yellow card) 11'; Nasuti (yellow card) 28'; Canteros (red card) 42'; Cubero (yellow card) 63'; Romero 82'	Report	Benedetto 24' (yellow card) 35'; Peruzzi 53'; Fabra (yellow card) 60'; Pavón 84'	Stadium: José Amalfitani; Referee: Patricio Loustau

April 16, 2017 20	Boca Juniors	1–1	Patronato	Buenos Aires
18:15 UTC−3	Benedetto 45'; Pavón (yellow card) 47'	Report	Geminiani (yellow card) 22'; Guzmán (yellow card) 35'; Comas (yellow card) 57'; Arce 90'	Stadium: La Bombonera; Referee: Germán Delfino

April 23, 2017 21	Atlético de Rafaela	0–0	Boca Juniors	Rafaela
16:15 UTC−3	Itabel (yellow card) 45'	Report	Pérez (yellow card) 45+1'	Stadium: Nuevo Monumental; Referee: Facundo Tello

April 30, 2017 22	Boca Juniors	3–0	Arsenal	Buenos Aires
19:10 UTC−3	Benedetto 4', 25'; Peruzzi (yellow card) 48'; Maroni 60'; Barrios (yellow card) 80'	Report	Pérez (yellow card) 11'; Wilchez (yellow card) 56'; Velázquez (yellow card) 90+1'	Stadium: La Bombonera; Referee: Darío Herrera

May 6, 2017 23	Estudiantes (LP)	0–0	Boca Juniors	La Plata
20:10 UTC−3	Schunke (yellow card) 3'; Sánchez (yellow card) 23'; Solari (yellow card) 43'; Ascacibar (yellow card) 46'; Umeres (yellow card) 73'	Report	Bentancur (yellow card) 17'; Pérez (yellow card) 43'; Peruzzi (yellow card) 68'	Stadium: Ciudad de La Plata; Referee: Silvio Trucco

May 14, 2017 24	Boca Juniors	1–3	River Plate	Buenos Aires
17:00 UTC−3	Insaurralde (yellow card) 22'; Fabra (yellow card) 29'; Vergini (yellow card) 43'; Gago 45+2'; Benedetto (yellow card) 65'	Report	Maidana (yellow card) 11'; Martínez 14'; Alario 23' (yellow card) 36'; Martínez Quarta (yellow card) 33'; Moreira (yellow card) 59'; Ponzio (yellow card) 86'; Driussi 90'	Stadium: La Bombonera; Referee: Patricio Loustau

May 21, 2017 25	Boca Juniors	1–0	Newell's Old Boys	Buenos Aires
18:00 UTC−3	Benedetto 27'; Pérez (yellow card) 42'	Report	Escobar (yellow card) 44'; Sills (yellow card) 45+1'; Mansilla (red card) 80'; Formica (yellow card) 89'	Stadium: La Bombonera

May 27, 2017 26	Huracán	1–1	Boca Juniors	Buenos Aires
19:30 UTC−3	González (yellow card) 41'; Briasco (yellow card) 50'; Nicolás Romat (yellow card) 78'; Compagnucci (yellow card) 88'; Romero Gamarra 90+5' (pen.)	Report	Peruzzi (yellow card) 24'; Benedetto (yellow card) 35' (goal) 74'; Barrios (yellow card) 47'; Jara (yellow card) 78'; Rossi (yellow card) 90+3'	Stadium: Tomás Adolfo Ducó; Referee: Darío Herrera

June 4, 2017 27	Boca Juniors	3–0	Independiente	Buenos Aires
19:00 UTC−3	Magallán (yellow card) 23'; Benedetto 28' (pen.), 74'; Gago (yellow card) 39'; Benítez 44'; Barrios (yellow card) 59'; Pérez (yellow card) 66'; Jara (yellow card) 73'	Report	Barco (yellow card) 4'; Gigliotti (yellow card) 17'; Franco (yellow card) 27'; Erviti (yellow card) 51'	Stadium: La Bombonera; Referee: Fernando Rapallini

June 18, 2017 28	Aldosivi	0–4	Boca Juniors	Mar del Plata
17:45 UTC−3	Brum (yellow card) 18'; Lugüercio (yellow card) 36'; Galván (yellow card) 55'; Miracco (yellow card) 55'; Canever (red card) 81'	Report	Pavón 38'; Centurión 40'; Gago 76' (pen.); Pérez (yellow card) 78'; Silva 83'	Stadium: José María Minella; Referee: Patricio Loustau

June 21, 2017 29	Olimpo	2–2	Boca Juniors	Bahía Blanca
19:45 UTC−3	Magallán 61' (o.g.); Blanco (yellow card) 62'; Cabral 74'	Report	Centurión 41'; Benedetto 42'; Silva (yellow card) 43'; Benítez (yellow card) 74'	Stadium: Roberto Carminatti; Referee: Federico Beligoy

June 25, 2017 30	Boca Juniors	2–1	Unión	Buenos Aires
16:15 UTC−3	Benedetto 11', 48'; Barrios (yellow card) 75'	Report	Blasi (yellow card) 56' (goal) 58'; M. Pittón (yellow card) 65'; Méndez (yellow card) 36'; Erramuspe (yellow card) 90+2'	Stadium: La Bombonera; Referee: Mauro Vigliano

=== Copa Argentina ===
==== Round of 64 ====
June 29, 2016	Boca Juniors	4–0	Güemes	San Juan
21:10 UTC−3	Pavón 0', 13'; Insaurralde 23'; Pérez 88'	Report		Stadium: Estadio San Juan del Bicentenario; Referee: Federico Beligoy

==== Round of 32 ====
August 22, 2016	Santamarina	1–2	Boca Juniors	Formosa
21:10 UTC−3	Pierce (yellow card) 4'; Aguirre Schmidt (yellow card) 29'; Michel 71'; Piñero (yellow card) 81'	Report	Benedetto 17'; Pavón 77'	Stadium: Estadio Antonio Romero; Referee: Silvio Trucco

==== Round of 16 ====
September 28, 2016	Lanús	2–2 (2–4 p)	Boca Juniors	Mar del Plata
21:10 UTC−3	Martínez 4' (yellow card) 65'; Herrera (yellow card) 13'; Braghieri 59'; Silva (yellow card) 13'	Report	Peruzzi (yellow card) 1'; Vergini (yellow card) 48'; Tevez 50', 64'; Pérez (yellow card) 55'	Stadium: José María Minella; Referee: Darío Herrera
	Penalties
	Martínez (penalty scored); Pasquini (penalty missed); Braghieri (penalty missed); Marcone (penalty scored)		(penalty scored) Tevez; (penalty scored) Pavón; (penalty scored) Benedetto; (penalty scored) Vergini

==== Quarterfinals ====
November 2, 2016	Rosario Central	2–1	Boca Juniors	Córdoba
21:10 UTC−3	Villagra (yellow card) 25'; Torsiglieri (yellow card) 31'; Fernández 37'; Herrera 41'; Salazar (yellow card) 71'; Menosse (yellow card) 82'; Colman (yellow card) 82'	Report	Pérez (yellow card) 12'; Pavón (yellow card) 39'; Silva (yellow card) 71'; Benedetto 90+5'	Stadium: Estadio Mario Alberto Kempes; Referee: Patricio Loustau

=== Copa Libertadores ===
==== Final Stages ====
===== Semifinals =====
July 7, 2016 First leg	Independiente del Valle (Ecuador)	2–1	(Argentina) Boca Juniors	Quito, Ecuador
19:45 UTC−5	Ju. Angulo (yellow card) 24'; Cabezas 61'; Jo. Angulo 75'; León (yellow card) 78'	Report	Pérez 12' (yellow card) 69'; Cubas (yellow card) 32'; Chávez (yellow card) 78'	Stadium: Estadio Olímpico Atahualpa; Referee: Wilmar Roldán (Colombia)

July 14, 2016 Second leg	Boca Juniors (Argentina)	2–3 (3-5 agg.)	(Ecuador) Independiente del Valle	Buenos Aires, Argentina
21:45 UTC−3	Pavón 3', 90'; Zuqui (yellow card) 14'; Fabra (yellow card) 41'; Díaz (yellow card) 54'; Lodeiro (penalty missed) 70'	Report	Caicedo (yellow card) 15' (goal) 24'; Cabezas 48'; Ju. Angulo 50'; Rizotto (yellow card) 63'; Mina (yellow card) 69'	Stadium: La Bombonera; Referee: Daniel Fedorczuk (Uruguay)

== Team statistics ==
	Total	Home	Away	Neutral
Games played	36	16	16	4
Games won	19	10	7	2
Games drawn	10	2	7	1
Games lost	6	3	2	1
Biggest win	4-0 vs Güemes; 4-0 vs Temperley; 4-0 vs Aldosivi	4-0 vs Temperley	4-0 vs Aldosivi	4-0 vs Güemes
Biggest loss	2-1 vs Ind. del Valle; 3-2 vs Ind. del Valle	3-2 vs Ind. del Valle	2-1 vs Ind. del Valle	2-1 vs Rosario Central
Biggest win (Primera División)	4-0 vs Temperley; 4-0 vs Aldosivi	4-0 vs Temperley	4-0 vs Aldosivi	None
Biggest win (Copa Argentina)	4-0 vs Güemes	None		4-0 vs Güemes
Biggest win (Copa Libertadores)	None			
Biggest loss (Primera División)	1-0 vs Lanús; 2-1 vs Talleres (C)	2-1 vs Talleres (C)	1-0 vs Lanús	None
Biggest loss (Copa Argentina)	2-1 vs Rosario Central	None		2-1 vs Rosario Central
Biggest loss (Copa Libertadores)	2-1 vs Ind. del Valle; 3-2 vs Ind. del Valle	3-2 vs Ind. del Valle	2-1 vs Ind. del Valle	None
Clean sheets	13	7	5	1
Goals scored	74	37	28	9
Goals conceded	35	15	15	5
Goal difference	+39	+22	+13	+4
Yellow cards	70	31	33	6
Red cards	3	2	1	0
Top scorer	Benedetto (23)	Benedetto (13)	Benedetto (8)	Pavón (3)
Worst discipline	Tevez; Centurión; Pérez Cardona (1 RC)	Tevez; Centurión; Pérez Cardona (1 RC)		
Penalties for	3	2	1	
Penalties against	1		1	

=== Season Appearances and goals ===
Last updated on June 25, 2017

No.	Pos	Nat	Player	Total		Primera División		Copa Argentina		Copa Libertadores	
No.	Pos	Nat	Player	Apps	Goals	Apps	Goals	Apps	Goals	Apps	Goals
Goalkeepers
1	GK	(Argentina) ARG	Guillermo Sara	15	-15	12	-10	3	-5	0	0
12	GK	(Argentina) ARG	Agustín Rossi	16	-12	16	-12	0	0	0	0
23	GK	(Argentina) ARG	Ramiro Martínez	0	0	0	0	0	0	0	0
28	GK	(Argentina) ARG	Axel Werner	2	-3	2	-3	0	0	0	0
Defenders
2	DF	(Argentina) ARG	Fernando Tobio	16	0	13	0	2+1	0	0	0
3	DF	(Argentina) ARG	Jonathan Silva	15	1	12+1	1	2	0	0	0
4	DF	(Argentina) ARG	Gino Peruzzi	30	3	25+1	3	4	0	0	0
6	DF	(Argentina) ARG	Lisandro Magallán	7	0	5+1	0	0+1	0	0	0
18	DF	(Colombia) COL	Frank Fabra	24	1	18+2	1	2	0	2	0
25	DF	(Argentina) ARG	Juan Manuel Insaurralde	24	2	18+1	1	2+1	1	2	0
27	DF	(Argentina) ARG	Santiago Vergini	31	0	24+4	0	3	0	0	0
35	DF	(Argentina) ARG	Nahuel Molina Lucero	0	0	0	0	0	0	0	0
Midfielders
5	MF	(Argentina) ARG	Fernando Gago	16	2	16	2	0	0	0	0
8	MF	(Argentina) ARG	Pablo Pérez	34	2	28	0	3+1	1	2	1
10	MF	(Argentina) ARG	Ricardo Centurión	24	8	17+5	8	2	0	0	0
14	MF	(Colombia) COL	Sebastián Pérez Cardona	12	0	4+8	0	0	0	0	0
15	MF	(Argentina) ARG	Fernando Zuqui	17	0	4+9	0	2	0	2	0
16	MF	(Colombia) COL	Wílmar Barrios	21	0	11+9	0	1	0	0	0
20	MF	(Argentina) ARG	Gonzalo Maroni	2	1	1+1	1	0	0	0	0
29	MF	(Argentina) ARG	Leonardo Jara	21	0	7+9	0	1+2	0	2	0
30	MF	(Uruguay) URU	Rodrigo Bentancur	26	0	20+2	0	2+1	0	0+1	0
40	MF	(Argentina) ARG	Julián Chicco	0	0	0	0	0	0	0	0
Forwards
7	FW	(Argentina) ARG	Cristian Pavón	35	14	30	9	4	3	1	2
9	FW	(Argentina) ARG	Darío Benedetto	30	23	24+1	21	2+1	2	1+1	0
17	FW	(Argentina) ARG	Nazareno Solís	4	0	1+3	0	0	0	0	0
19	FW	(Argentina) ARG	Walter Bou	27	6	5+20	6	0+1	0	0+1	0
22	FW	(Argentina) ARG	Oscar Benítez	9	2	2+7	2	0	0	0	0
26	FW	(Argentina) ARG	Marcelo Torres	0	0	0	0	0	0	0	0
Players away from the club on loan:
20	MF	(Argentina) ARG	Adrián Cubas	7	0	2+1	0	1+1	0	2	0
22	MF	(Argentina) ARG	Gonzalo Castellani	1	0	1	0	0	0	0	0
25	FW	(Argentina) ARG	Andrés Chávez	1	0	0	0	0	0	0+1	0
Players transferred out during the season:
1	GK	(Argentina) ARG	Agustín Orion	3	-5	0	0	1	0	2	-5
2	DF	(Argentina) ARG	Daniel Díaz	3	0	0	0	1	0	2	0
21	DF	(Argentina) ARG	Leandro Marín	0	0	0	0	0	0	0	0
11	MF	(Argentina) ARG	Federico Carrizo	4	0	1+1	0	1+1	0	0	0
14	MF	(Uruguay) URU	Nicolás Lodeiro	3	0	0	0	1	0	2	0
17	MF	(Argentina) ARG	César Meli	0	0	0	0	0	0	0	0
18	MF	(Argentina) ARG	Nicolás Colazo	0	0	0	0	0	0	0	0
10	FW	(Argentina) ARG	Carlos Tevez	17	7	11	5	4	2	2	0
34	FW	(Argentina) ARG	Sebastián Palacios	0	0	0	0	0	0	0	0

=== Top scorers ===
Last updated on June 25, 2017

Rank	Pos.	No.	Name	Primera División	Copa Argentina	Copa Libertadores	Total
1	FW	9	(Argentina) Darío Benedetto	21	2		23
2	FW	7	(Argentina) Cristian Pavón	9	3	2	14
3	MF	10	(Argentina) Ricardo Centurión	8			8
4	FW	10	(Argentina) Carlos Tevez	5	2		7
5	FW	19	(Argentina) Walter Bou	6			6
6	DF	4	(Argentina) Gino Peruzzi	3			3
7	DF	25	(Argentina) Juan Manuel Insaurralde	1	1		2
8	MF	8	(Argentina) Pablo Pérez		1	1	2
9	FW	22	(Argentina) Oscar Benítez	2			2
10	MF	5	(Argentina) Fernando Gago	2			2
11	DF	18	(Colombia) Frank Fabra	1			1
12	MF	20	(Argentina) Gonzalo Maroni	1			1
13	DF	3	(Argentina) Jonathan Silva	1			1
Own goals				2			2
Total				62	9	3	74

=== Clean sheets ===
Last updated on June 25, 2017

Rank	Pos.	No.	Name	Primera División	Copa Argentina	Copa Libertadores	Total
1	GK	12	(Argentina) Agustín Rossi	7			7
2	GK	1	(Argentina) Guillermo Sara	4			4
3	GK	1	(Argentina) Agustín Orion		1		1
Total				10	1		11

=== Disciplinary record ===
Last updated on June 25, 2017

No.	Pos	Nat	Name	Primera División			Copa Argentina			Copa Libertadores			Total		
No.	Pos	Nat	Name	Booked	(yellow card) (yellow-red card)	Sent off (straight red)	Booked	(yellow card) (yellow-red card)	Sent off (straight red)	Booked	(yellow card) (yellow-red card)	Sent off (straight red)	Booked	(yellow card) (yellow-red card)	Sent off (straight red)
Goalkeepers
1	GK	(Argentina)	Guillermo Sara	1									1		
12	GK	(Argentina)	Agustín Rossi	1									1		
23	GK	(Argentina)	Ramiro Martínez												
28	GK	(Argentina)	Axel Werner												
Defenders
2	DF	(Argentina)	Fernando Tobio	2									2		
3	DF	(Argentina)	Jonathan Silva	1			1						2		
4	DF	(Argentina)	Gino Peruzzi	6			1						7		
6	DF	(Argentina)	Lisandro Magallán	1									1		
18	DF	(Colombia)	Frank Fabra	4						1			5		
25	DF	(Argentina)	Juan Manuel Insaurralde	4									4		
27	DF	(Argentina)	Santiago Vergini	4			1						4		
35	DF	(Argentina)	Nahuel Molina Lucero												
Midfielders
5	MF	(Argentina)	Fernando Gago	4									4		
8	MF	(Argentina)	Pablo Pérez	9			2			1			12		
10	MF	(Argentina)	Ricardo Centurión	1		1							1		1
14	MF	(Colombia)	Sebastián Pérez Cardona	2		1							2		1
15	MF	(Argentina)	Fernando Zuqui	1						1			2		
16	MF	(Colombia)	Wílmar Barrios	4									4		
20	MF	(Argentina)	Gonzalo Maroni												
29	MF	(Argentina)	Leonardo Jara	2									2		
30	MF	(Uruguay)	Rodrigo Bentancur	3									3		
40	MF	(Argentina)	Julián Chicco												
Forwards
7	FW	(Argentina)	Cristian Pavón	2			1						3		
9	FW	(Argentina)	Darío Benedetto	4									4		
17	FW	(Argentina)	Nazareno Solís												
19	FW	(Argentina)	Walter Bou												
22	FW	(Argentina)	Oscar Benítez	1									1		
26	FW	(Argentina)	Marcelo Torres												
Players transferred out during the season
1	GK	(Argentina)	Agustín Orion												
2	DF	(Argentina)	Daniel Díaz							1			1		
21	DF	(Argentina)	Leandro Marín												
11	MF	(Argentina)	Federico Carrizo												
14	MF	(Uruguay)	Nicolás Lodeiro												
17	MF	(Argentina)	César Meli												
18	MF	(Argentina)	Nicolás Colazo												
20	MF	(Argentina)	Adrián Cubas							1			1		
22	MF	(Argentina)	Gonzalo Castellani												
10	FW	(Argentina)	Carlos Tevez	1		1							1		1
25	FW	(Argentina)	Andrés Chávez							1			1		
34	FW	(Argentina)	Sebastián Palacios												
Total				58		3	6			6			70		3
