= 2016 Club Atlético Boca Juniors season =

Boca Juniors
2016 season
- President: (Argentina) Daniel Angelici
- Manager: (Argentina) Rodolfo Arruabarrena (until February 29) (Argentina) Guillermo Barros Schelotto (from March 2)
- Stadium: Estadio Alberto J. Armando (La Bombonera)
- Primera División: 10th
- Supercopa Argentina: Runners-up
- Copa Libertadores: Semi-finals
- Top goalscorer: League: Carlos Tevez (4); All: Carlos Tevez (9)
- Average home league attendance: 32,197 (highest average attendance in the league in 2016)
| Home colours | Away colours | Third colours |

The 2016 Club Atlético Boca Juniors season was the 87th consecutive Primera División season for the senior squad. During the first part of the 2016, Boca Juniors took part in the Primera División, Supercopa Argentina and the Copa Libertadores.

== Season overview ==
=== November ===
Boca played two friendly games, the first one against Puebla F.C. in Mexico losing 1–0 on November 19 and the second one in Resistencia against a team of Liga Chaqueña de fútbol winning 3–2 on November 28.

=== December ===
In the first days of December the new uniform was presented: it featured a lighter blue tone. Also, Daniel Angelici won the president elections and will be the chairman until 2019. On December 22 Boca were drawn into Group 3 of the 2016 Copa Libertadores with Bolivian champions Bolívar, Colombian champions Deportivo Cali and a team from the First Stage. On December 29 Jonathan Silva was loaned from Sporting CP of Portugal. In the last days of December Luciano Fabián Monzón and José Pedro Fuenzalida left the club.

=== January ===
In the first days of 2016 Leonardo Jara arrived from Estudiantes (LP). Also, Federico Carrizo and Luciano Acosta returned from their loans in Cruz Azul and Estudiantes (LP). Additionally, Nahuel Zárate and Claudio Pérez also returned from their loans in Godoy Cruz and Belgrano, but they will not be taken into consideration by Arruabarrena. Pérez rescinded his contract with Boca. Youth exponents Tomás Pochettino and Franco Cristaldo signed for Defensa y Justicia on an 18-month loan and for Elche CF on a 6-month loan respectively. Daniel Osvaldo was officially presented again in Boca after playing in FC Porto, he signed an 18-month contract with the club. Juan Cruz Komar signed for Talleres (C) on a six-month loan. On January 12 Jonathan Calleri was sold to Deportivo Maldonado and loaned to São Paulo. On January 16, Boca won 3–0 over Emelec in San Juan, but then lost four friendlies including both against River Plate, leaving a bad picture of summer. This led to two new players arrive at the club: Frank Fabra and Juan Manuel Insaurralde.

=== February ===
In earlier February, Leandro Marín signed for Tigre on a six-month loan and Lisandro Magallán signed for Defensa y Justicia also on a six-month loan. At the start of the tournament Boca played against Temperley in a 0–0 draw and four days later, lost against San Lorenzo 0–4 in the 2015 Supercopa Argentina. Nahuel Zárate was loaned 18 months to Unión and Luciano Acosta to D.C. United until the end of 2016; also, Federico Bravo was loaned to MLS team New York City FC until the end of 2016. On the second round of Primera División Boca lost against Atlético Tucumán 0–1, playing very bad. After six matches without scoring, Boca managed to win against San Martín (SJ) 1–0 on the third round of Primera División, and against Newell's Old Boys 4–1 in Round 4. On February 24 Boca played the first match of the group stage of Copa Libertadores against Deportivo Cali drawing 0-0. On the round 5 of Primera División Boca lost 0–1 against Racing.

=== March ===
Rodolfo Arruabarrena was sacked and is no longer the head coach of Boca; where he won 2 titles and managed 75 games, winning 47, drawing 13 and losing 15. On March 1, Guillermo Barros Schelotto was announced as the new manager, being his third time as manager in a professional football team. He returns to the club after his step as player between 1997 and 2007 where he won 16 titles. In the first match of the new manager, Boca played against Racing in a 0–0 draw on the second round of Copa Libertadores Group Stage. On the Round 6, Boca played against River Plate, the Superclásico, the most important match of Argentina; it was a 0–0 draw. Boca achieved another draw in the group stage of Copa Libertadores, 1–1 in La Paz against Bolívar. On March 14 Boca managed to win 2–1 against Unión. On March 20 Boca lost the match 0–2 against Lanús playing very bad.

=== April ===
The first match of April was a 3–0 victory over Atlético de Rafaela. On April 4 the third uniform was presented: it is black with a golden strip. Boca won the first match in Copa Libertadores: 3–1 against Bolívar on the fourth match of the group. On April 10 Boca lost the match 0–2 against Tigre. On April 13 Boca qualified to the final stages of the Copa Libertadores after winning 1–0 in Avellaneda against Racing. In the 11 round Boca won 4–1 against Aldosivi. Boca finished the Group Stage of Copa Libertadores winning 6–2 against Deportivo Cali. The second Superclasico against River Plate was another 0–0 draw. In the first game of the Round of 16 of Copa Libertadores, Boca achieved a great victory 2–1 in Asunción against Cerro Porteño. In the round 13 of the local Tournament Boca lost 1–0 against Argentinos Juniors, playing with an alternative team.

=== May ===
In the second leg of the Round of 16 of Copa Libertadores, Boca won 3–1 against Cerro Porteño and advanced to the Quarterfinals. In the round 14 of the local tournament Boca played against Huracán in a 0–0 draw. In the first leg of the Copa Libertadores Quarterfinals played on May 12, Boca tied 1–1 in Montevideo against Nacional. On May 15, Boca played against Estudiantes (LP) and lost 3–1. On May 19 Boca advanced to the Semifinals of the Copa Libertadores after beating Nacional in the Penalty shoot-out. Boca played the last match of the local tournament and the season: it was a 0–0 draw against Defensa y Justicia.

== Squad ==
Last updated on May 22, 2016

| Squad No. | Name | Nationality | Position | Date of Birth (Age) | Apps | Goals | Signed from | Note |
Goalkeepers
| 1 | Agustín Orion (VC 4º) | (Argentina) | GK | June 26, 1981 (age 45) | 200 | -163 | (Argentina) Estudiantes (LP) | |
| 23 | Ramiro Martínez | (Argentina) | GK | April 18, 1991 (age 35) | 0 | 0 | (Argentina) Academy | |
| 31 | Guillermo Sara | (Argentina) | GK | September 30, 1987 (age 39) | 19 | -17 | (Spain) Real Betis | |
Defenders
| 2 | Daniel Díaz (C) | (Argentina) | DF | July 13, 1979 (age 47) | 198 | 13 | (Spain) Atlético Madrid | |
| 3 | Jonathan Silva | (Argentina) | DF | June 29, 1994 (age 32) | 21 | 1 | (Portugal) Sporting CP | |
| 4 | Gino Peruzzi | (Argentina) | DF | June 9, 1992 (age 34) | 38 | 1 | (Italy) Catania | |
| 6 | Fernando Tobio | (Argentina) | DF | October 18, 1989 (age 36) | 34 | 0 | (Brazil) Palmeiras | |
| 13 | Alexis Rolín | (Uruguay) | DF | February 7, 1989 (age 37) | 15 | 0 | (Italy) Catania | |
| 24 | Frank Fabra | (Colombia) | DF | February 22, 1991 (age 35) | 10 | 2 | (Colombia) Independiente Medellín | |
| 26 | Pedro Silva Torrejón | (Argentina) | DF | January 25, 1997 (age 29) | 2 | 0 | (Argentina) Academy | |
| 33 | Juan Manuel Insaurralde | (Argentina) | DF | October 3, 1984 (age 42) | 101 | 6 | (Mexico) Chiapas | |
| 35 | Nahuel Molina Lucero | (Argentina) | DF | April 6, 1998 (age 28) | 9 | 0 | (Argentina) Academy | |
Midfielders
| 5 | Fernando Gago (VC 3º) | (Argentina) | MF | April 10, 1986 (age 40) | 160 | 6 | (Spain) Valencia | Injured |
| 8 | Pablo Pérez | (Argentina) | MF | August 10, 1985 (age 41) | 45 | 4 | (Spain) Málaga | |
| 11 | Federico Carrizo | (Argentina) | MF | May 17, 1991 (age 35) | 57 | 6 | (Mexico) Cruz Azul | |
| 14 | Nicolás Lodeiro | (Uruguay) | MF | March 21, 1989 (age 37) | 48 | 11 | (Brazil) Corinthians | Injured |
| 15 | Gonzalo Maroni | (Argentina) | MF | March 18, 1999 (age 27) | 1 | 0 | (Argentina) Academy | |
| 17 | César Meli | (Argentina) | MF | June 20, 1992 (age 34) | 75 | 5 | (Argentina) Colón | |
| 18 | Nicolás Colazo | (Argentina) | MF | July 8, 1990 (age 36) | 125 | 9 | (Argentina) All Boys | |
| 20 | Adrián Cubas | (Argentina) | MF | May 22, 1996 (age 30) | 37 | 1 | (Argentina) Academy | Injured |
| 21 | Cristian Erbes (VC 5º) | (Argentina) | MF | January 6, 1990 (age 36) | 155 | 5 | (Argentina) Academy | |
| 28 | Alexis Messidoro | (Argentina) | MF | May 13, 1997 (age 29) | 5 | 1 | (Argentina) Academy | |
| 29 | Leonardo Jara | (Argentina) | MF | May 20, 1991 (age 35) | 15 | 1 | (Argentina) Estudiantes (LP) | |
| 30 | Rodrigo Bentancur | (Uruguay) | MF | June 5, 1997 (age 29) | 39 | 1 | (Argentina) Academy | |
| 40 | Julián Chicco | (Argentina) | MF | January 13, 1998 (age 28) | 3 | 0 | (Argentina) Academy | |
Forwards
| 7 | Cristian Pavón | (Argentina) | FW | January 21, 1996 (age 30) | 19 | 4 | (Argentina) Colón | |
| 9 | Daniel Osvaldo | (Italy) | FW | January 12, 1986 (age 40) | 21 | 7 | (Portugal) Porto | |
| 10 | Carlos Tevez (VC 2º) | (Argentina) | FW | February 5, 1984 (age 42) | 149 | 56 | (Italy) Juventus | |
| 16 | Nicolás Benegas | (Argentina) | FW | March 1, 1996 (age 30) | 4 | 0 | (Argentina) Academy | |
| 25 | Andrés Chávez | (Argentina) | FW | March 21, 1991 (age 35) | 67 | 18 | (Argentina) Banfield | |
| 34 | Sebastián Palacios | (Argentina) | FW | January 20, 1992 (age 34) | 49 | 8 | (Argentina) Arsenal | |

== Transfers ==
Players transferred in
| Date | Pos. | Name | Club | Fee |
|---|---|---|---|---|
| 2 January 2016 | MF | (Argentina) Leonardo Jara | (Argentina) Estudiantes (LP) | Undisclosed |
| 8 January 2016 | FW | (Italy) Daniel Osvaldo | (Portugal) FC Porto | Free |
| 23 January 2016 | DF | (Colombia) Frank Fabra | (Colombia) Independiente Medellín | Undisclosed |
| 30 January 2016 | DF | (Argentina) Juan Manuel Insaurralde | (Mexico) Chiapas F.C. | $1.000.000 |
Players transferred out
| Date | Pos. | Name | Club | Fee |
| 12 January 2016 | FW | (Argentina) Jonathan Calleri | (Uruguay) Deportivo Maldonado | $12.000.000 |
Players loaned in
| Start date | Pos. | Name | Club | End date |
| 29 December 2015 | DF | (Argentina) Jonathan Silva | (Portugal) Sporting CP | July 2016 |
Players loaned out
| Start date | Pos. | Name | Club | End date |
| 5 January 2016 | MF | (Argentina) Tomás Pochettino | (Argentina) Defensa y Justicia | July 2017 |
| 5 January 2016 | MF | (Argentina) Franco Cristaldo | (Spain) Elche CF | July 2016 |
| 9 January 2016 | DF | (Argentina) Juan Cruz Komar | (Argentina) Talleres (C) | July 2016 |
| 3 February 2016 | DF | (Argentina) Leandro Marín | (Argentina) Tigre | July 2016 |
| 3 February 2016 | DF | (Argentina) Lisandro Magallán | (Argentina) Defensa y Justicia | July 2016 |
| 10 February 2016 | DF | (Argentina) Nahuel Zárate | (Argentina) Unión | July 2017 |
| 15 February 2016 | MF | (Argentina) Federico Bravo | (United States) New York City FC | December 2016 |
| 20 February 2016 | MF | (Argentina) Luciano Acosta | (United States) D.C. United | December 2016 |
Loan Return
| Date | Pos. | Name | Return to | Return from |
| 1 January 2016 | MF | (Argentina) Federico Carrizo | (Argentina) Boca Juniors | (Mexico) Cruz Azul |
| 1 January 2016 | MF | (Argentina) Luciano Acosta | (Argentina) Boca Juniors | (Argentina) Estudiantes (LP) |
| 1 January 2016 | DF | (Argentina) Nahuel Zárate | (Argentina) Boca Juniors | (Argentina) Godoy Cruz |
| 1 January 2016 | DF | (Argentina) Claudio Pérez | (Argentina) Boca Juniors | (Argentina) Belgrano |
| 31 December 2015 | MF | (Argentina) Luciano Fabián Monzón | (Italy) Catania | (Argentina) Boca Juniors |
Players released
| Date | Pos. | Name | Subsequent club | Join date |
| 31 December 2015 | MF | (Chile) José Pedro Fuenzalida | (Chile) Universidad Católica | 11 January 2016 |
| 1 January 2016 | DF | (Argentina) Claudio Pérez | (Argentina) Banfield | 26 January 2016 |

== Pre-season and friendlies ==
Win Draw Loss Postponed

| November 18, 2015 Pre-season | Puebla F.C. (Mexico) | 1–0 | (Argentina) Boca Juniors | Puebla City, Mexico |
| 23:00 | Alustiza | | | Stadium: Estadio Cuauhtémoc; Referee: Roberto García Orozco (Mexico) |

| November 27, 2015 Pre-season | Liga Chaqueña | 2–3 | Boca Juniors | Resistencia |
| 18:00 | Liva; Plutt | | Chávez; Meli | Stadium: Estadio Centenario |

| January 16, 2016 Atlantic-Pacific Champions Cup | Boca Juniors (Argentina) | 3–0 | (Ecuador) Emelec | San Juan, Argentina |
| 20:00 | Messidoro 58'; Pavón 60'; Carrizo 90' | | Mena (yellow card) 17' | Stadium: Estadio del Bicentenario; Referee: Diego Abal (Argentina) |

| January 20, 2016 Copa de Oro | Boca Juniors | 2–4 | Racing Club | Mar del Plata |
| 22:10 | Pavón (yellow card) 40'; Chávez (penalty missed) 66' 66', 69' (yellow card) 71'; Magallán (yellow card) 72' (yellow-red card) 77'; Rolín (red card) 84' | Report | Milito 5'; Acuña 12' (yellow card) 64'; Vismara (yellow card) 19'; Sánchez (yellow card) 32'; Lollo (yellow card) 44'; Campi (yellow card) 45+2'; Ibáñez (yellow card) 54'; Bou 73' (pen.), 77' (pen.) | Stadium: Estadio José María Minella; Referee: Germán Delfino |

| January 23, 2016 Copa Luis B. Nofal | River Plate | 1–0 | Boca Juniors | Mar del Plata |
| 22:10 | Pisculichi 18' (pen.) (red card) 84'; Vangioni (yellow card) 19'; Alario (yellow card) 34'; Casco (yellow card) 45'; Domingo (yellow card) 68'; Maidana (red card) 80' | Report | Silva (red card) 10'; Tevez (yellow card) 17'; Osvaldo (yellow card) 21'; Cubas (yellow card) 41'; Peruzzi (red card) 65'; Díaz (red card) 78'; Jara (yellow card) 86'; Tobio (yellow card) 90+4' | Stadium: Estadio José María Minella; Referee: Patricio Loustau |

| January 27, 2016 Copa de Oro | Boca Juniors | 0–2 | Estudiantes (LP) | Mar del Plata |
| 22:10 | Pérez (yellow card) 16'; Chávez (yellow card) 53' | Report | Fernández 35'; Umeres 47'; Ascacibar (yellow card) 62'; Auzqui (yellow card) 78'; Marchioni (yellow card) 88' | Stadium: Estadio José María Minella; Referee: Pedro Argañaraz |

| January 30, 2016 Copa Luis B. Nofal | Boca Juniors | 0–1 (0–2 agg.) | River Plate | Mendoza |
| 22:10 | Tevez (yellow card) 57'; Lodeiro (yellow card) 64' | Report | Álvarez Balanta (yellow card) 23'; Mercado (yellow card) 52'; Mora 80' (pen.) (yellow card) 81'; Vangioni (yellow card) 90' | Stadium: Estadio Malvinas Argentinas; Referee: Néstor Pitana |

== Competitions ==
=== Overall ===
| Competition | Started round | Final position/round | First match | Last match |
|---|---|---|---|---|
| Primera División | – | 10th | 6 February 2016 | 22 May 2016 |
| Supercopa Argentina | Final | Runners-up | 10 February 2016 | |
| Copa Libertadores | Second stage | -^{1} | 24 February 2016 | 19 May 2016 |

1: There is a one-month break between the quarterfinals and semifinals due to the Copa América Centenario held in June, so the Semifinals belong to the next season.

=== Overview ===
| Competition | Record | | | | | | | |
| Competition | Pld | W | D | L | GF | GA | GD | Win % |
|---|---|---|---|---|---|---|---|---|
| Primera División | 16 | 5 | 5 | 6 | 15 | 13 | +2 | 31.25 |
| Supercopa Argentina | 1 | 0 | 0 | 1 | 0 | 4 | −4 | 0.00 |
| Copa Libertadores | 10 | 5 | 5 | 0 | 18 | 8 | +10 | 50.00 |
| Total | 27 | 10 | 10 | 7 | 33 | 25 | +8 | 37.04 |

Last updated: May 22, 2016
Source: Competitions

=== Primera División ===
==== League table ====
Zone 2
| Pos | Team | Pld | W | D | L | GF | GA | GD | Pts |
|---|---|---|---|---|---|---|---|---|---|
| 8 | Unión | 16 | 5 | 7 | 4 | 24 | 22 | +2 | 22 |
| 9 | Tigre | 16 | 5 | 5 | 6 | 21 | 17 | +4 | 20 |
| 10 | Boca Juniors | 16 | 5 | 5 | 6 | 15 | 13 | +2 | 20 |
| 11 | Aldosivi | 16 | 4 | 5 | 7 | 19 | 28 | −9 | 17 |
| 12 | Newell's Old Boys | 16 | 3 | 7 | 6 | 16 | 21 | −5 | 16 |

Source: AFA

==== Relegation table ====
| Pos | Team | 2013–14 Pts | 2014 Pts | 2015 Pts | 2016 Pts | Total Pts | Total Pld | Avg |
|---|---|---|---|---|---|---|---|---|
| 3 | Independiente | — | 33 | 54 | 27 | 114 | 65 | 1.754 |
| 4 | Boca Juniors | 61 | 31 | 64 | 20 | 176 | 103 | 1.709 |
| 5 | Lanús | 59 | 35 | 42 | 38 | 174 | 103 | 1.689 |

==== Results summary ====
| Overall | | | | | | | | Home | | | | | | Away | | | | | |
| Pld | W | D | L | GF | GA | GD | Pts | W | D | L | GF | GA | GD | W | D | L | GF | GA | GD |
|---|---|---|---|---|---|---|---|---|---|---|---|---|---|---|---|---|---|---|---|
| 15 | 5 | 4 | 6 | 15 | 13 | +2 | 19 | 4 | 2 | 1 | 13 | 4 | +9 | 1 | 2 | 5 | 2 | 9 | −7 |

Source: AFA

==== Results by round ====
| Round | 1 | 2 | 3 | 4 | 5 | 6 | 7 | 8 | 9 | 10 | 11 | 12 | 13 | 14 | 15 | 16 |
|---|---|---|---|---|---|---|---|---|---|---|---|---|---|---|---|---|
| Ground | A | H | A | H | A | A | H | A | H | A | H | H | A | H | A | H |
| Result | D | L | W | W | L | D | W | L | W | L | W | D | L | D | L | D |
| Position | 10 | 12 | 8 | 4 | 7 | 6 | 6 | 8 | 7 | 8 | 5 | 5 | 7 | 9 | 9 | 10 |

Source: AFA
A = Away; H = Home; W = Win; D = Draw; L = Loss

==== Matches ====
Win Draw Loss Postponed

| February 6, 2016 1 | Temperley | 0–0 | Boca Juniors | Banfield |
| 21:00 UTC−3 | Cólzera (yellow card) 11'; Figueroa (yellow card) 14'; Arregui (yellow card) 84'; Brandán (yellow card) 90+2' | Report | Peruzzi (yellow card) 26'; Gago (yellow card) 72' | Stadium: Florencio Solá; Referee: Fernando Echenique |

| February 14, 2016 2 | Boca Juniors | 0–1 | Atlético Tucumán | Buenos Aires |
| 19:15 UTC−3 | Insaurralde (yellow card) 53'; Díaz (yellow card) 89' | Report | González 23'; Villalba (yellow card) 46'; Ayala (yellow card) 77'; Zampedri (red card) 80' | Stadium: La Bombonera; Referee: Federico Beligoy |

| February 17, 2016 3 | San Martín (SJ) | 0–1 | Boca Juniors | San Juan |
| 21:15 UTC−3 | Capelli (yellow card) 62' (yellow-red card) 88'; Pelaitay (yellow card) 69'; Lugo (yellow card) 85' | Report | Tevez 36'; Insaurralde (yellow card) 38'; Díaz (yellow card) 49'; Bentancur (yellow card) 71' | Stadium: San Juan del Bicentenario; Referee: Silvio Trucco |

| February 20, 2016 4 | Boca Juniors | 4–1 | Newell's Old Boys | Buenos Aires |
| 21:15 UTC−3 | Bentancur 0'; Tevez 5'; Silva 36'; Palacios 72' | Report | Mateo (yellow card) 24'; Rodríguez 56'; Mugni (yellow card) 70' | Stadium: La Bombonera; Referee: Fernando Espinoza |

| February 28, 2016 5 | Racing | 1–0 | Boca Juniors | Avellaneda |
| 19:15 UTC−3 | Martínez 9'; Sánchez (yellow card) 30'; Milito (yellow card) 37'; Grimi (yellow card) 63' | Report | Silva (yellow card) 14'; Pérez (yellow card) 57'; Palacios (yellow card) 64'; Gago (yellow card) 67' | Stadium: Presidente Juan Domingo Perón; Referee: Jorge Baliño |

| March 6, 2016 6 | River Plate | 0–0 | Boca Juniors | Buenos Aires |
| 17:00 UTC−3 | Mammana (yellow card) 48'; Vangioni (yellow card) 57'; Mercado (yellow card) 66'; Martínez (yellow card) 90' | Report | Insaurralde (yellow card) 7'; Pérez (yellow card) 24'; Díaz (yellow card) 81'; Gago (yellow card) 83' | Stadium: Monumental Antonio Vespucio Liberti; Referee: Patricio Loustau |

| March 14, 2016 7 | Boca Juniors | 2–1 | Unión | Buenos Aires |
| 21:00 UTC−3 | Lodeiro 69'; Tevez 90' (yellow card) 90+3' | Report | García Guerreño (yellow card) 44'; Gamba 58'; Malcorra (yellow card) 81' | Stadium: La Bombonera; Referee: Darío Herrera |

| March 20, 2016 8 | Lanús | 2–0 | Boca Juniors | Lanús |
| 20:00 UTC−3 | Acosta 1'; Sand 3'; Velázquez (yellow card) 14'; Braghieri (yellow card) 59' | Report | Lodeiro (yellow card) 63'; Pérez (yellow card) 66'; Tobio (yellow card) 74' | Stadium: Ciudad de Lanús; Referee: Fernando Rapallini |

| April 2, 2016 9 | Boca Juniors | 3–0 | Atlético de Rafaela | Buenos Aires |
| 17:45 UTC−3 | Tevez 24'; Carrizo 42'; Cubas (yellow card) 43'; Orión (yellow card) 66'; Lodeiro 81' | Report | Abero (yellow card) 4'; Godoy (yellow card) 32'; Colombo (yellow card) 34' (yellow-red card) 70'; Díaz (penalty missed) 67' | Stadium: La Bombonera; Referee: Facundo Tello |

| April 10, 2016 10 | Tigre | 2–0 | Boca Juniors | Victoria |
| 20:00 UTC−3 | Janson (yellow card) 30' (goal) 64'; Papa (yellow card) 61'; Silva 68' (o.g.) | Report | Pérez (yellow card) 23'; Tobio (yellow card) 54' | Stadium: José Dellagiovanna; Referee: Silvio Trucco |

| April 16, 2016 11 | Boca Juniors | 4–1 | Aldosivi | Buenos Aires |
| 17:45 UTC−3 | Chávez (yellow card) 20' (goal) 45', 71'; Lodeiro 45'; Messidoro 53'; Erbes (yellow card) 60' | Report | Bandiera 21'; Lamberti (yellow card) 85' | Stadium: La Bombonera; Referee: Federico Beligoy |

| April 24, 2016 12 | Boca Juniors | 0–0 | River Plate | Buenos Aires |
| 16:15 UTC−3 | Pérez (red card) 11'; Silva (yellow card) 38'; Insaurralde (yellow card) 79'; Chávez (yellow card) 90+1' | Report | Casco (yellow card) 1'; Álvarez Balanta (yellow card) 11'; Alario (yellow card) 33' | Stadium: La Bombonera; Referee: Darío Herrera |

| April 30, 2016 13 | Argentinos Juniors | 1–0 | Boca Juniors | Buenos Aires |
| 20:10 UTC−3 | Laso (yellow card) 52'; Bueno 61'; Freire (red card) 78' | Report | Palacios (yellow card) 25'; Messidoro (yellow card) 87' | Stadium: Diego Armando Maradona; Referee: Fernando Rapallini |

| May 8, 2016 14 | Boca Juniors | 0–0 | Huracán | Buenos Aires |
| 18:30 UTC−3 | | Report | San Román (yellow card) 68' | Stadium: La Bombonera; Referee: Mariano Gonzalez |

| May 15, 2016 15 | Estudiantes (LP) | 3–1 | Boca Juniors | La Plata |
| 20:00 UTC−3 | Fernández 26', 33'; Schunke (yellow card) 30'; Rodríguez (yellow card) 76'; Viatri 89' | Report | Chávez 13'; Bentancur (yellow card) 31'; Tobio (yellow card) 33'; Rolín (yellow card) 73'; Chicco (yellow card) 75' | Stadium: Ciudad de La Plata; Referee: Diego Abal |

| May 22, 2016 16 | Boca Juniors | 0–0 | Defensa y Justicia | Buenos Aires |
| 18:30 UTC−3 | Tobio (yellow card) 41'; Jara (yellow card) 45'; Carrizo (penalty missed) 61' (yellow card) 65'; Pérez (yellow card) 82' | Report | Delgado (yellow card) 36'; Barboza (yellow card) 60' | Stadium: La Bombonera; Referee: Fernando Echenique |

=== Supercopa Argentina ===
| February 10, 2016 | Boca Juniors | 0–4 | San Lorenzo | Estadio Mario Alberto Kempes, Córdoba |
| 21:10 UTC−3 | Pérez (yellow card) 25'; Cubas (yellow card) 69'; Silva (yellow card) 82' | Report | Belluschi 44'; Buffarini (yellow card) 51'; Barrientos 74', 83'; Ortigoza (yellow card) 79'; Blandi 89' | Referee: Darío Herrera |

=== Copa Libertadores ===
==== Group stage ====
| Pos | Team | Pld | W | D | L | GF | GA | GD | Pts | Qualification |
|---|---|---|---|---|---|---|---|---|---|---|
| 1 | (Argentina) Boca Juniors (A) | 6 | 3 | 3 | 0 | 11 | 4 | +7 | 12 | Final stages |
| 2 | (Argentina) Racing (A) | 6 | 2 | 3 | 1 | 11 | 7 | +4 | 9 | Final stages |
| 3 | (Bolivia) Bolívar | 6 | 1 | 3 | 2 | 10 | 10 | 0 | 6 | |
| 4 | (Colombia) Deportivo Cali | 6 | 0 | 3 | 3 | 7 | 18 | −11 | 3 | |

Source: CONMEBOL
Rules for classification: 1) points; 2) goal difference; 3) goals scored; 4) away goals scored; 5) drawing of lots.
(A) Advanced to the round of 16

| February 24, 2016 1 | Deportivo Cali (Colombia) | 0–0 | (Argentina) Boca Juniors | Palmira, Colombia |
| 19:45 UTC−5 | Godoy (yellow card) 12'; Lozano (yellow card) 15'; Rentería (yellow card) 52'; Preciado (yellow card) 55'; A. Pérez (yellow card) 90+1' | Report | P. Pérez (yellow card) 19'; Tevez (yellow card) 26'; Palacios (yellow card) 58'; Silva (yellow card) 84' | Stadium: Estadio Deportivo Cali; Referee: Péricles Cortez (Brazil) |

| March 3, 2016 2 | Boca Juniors (Argentina) | 0–0 | (Argentina) Racing | Buenos Aires, Argentina |
| 19:30 UTC−3 | Insaurralde (yellow card) 14'; Silva (yellow card) 21'; Pérez (yellow card) 37'; Meli (yellow card) 41'; D. Díaz (yellow card) 90+2' | Report | Vittor (yellow card) 30'; G. Díaz (yellow card) 79' | Stadium: La Bombonera; Referee: Sandro Ricci (Brazil) |

| March 10, 2016 3 | Bolívar (Bolivia) | 1–1 | (Argentina) Boca Juniors | La Paz, Bolivia |
| 20:45 UTC−4 | Saavedra 27'; Cardozo (yellow card) 42'; Flores (yellow card) 70' | Report | Carrizo 90+4' | Stadium: Estadio Hernando Siles; Referee: Andrés Cunha (Uruguay) |

| April 7, 2016 4 | Boca Juniors (Argentina) | 3–1 | (Bolivia) Bolívar | Buenos Aires, Argentina |
| 19:30 UTC−3 | Fabra (yellow card) 15'; Gago 32'; Tevez 42'; Carrizo 48'; Insaurralde (yellow card) 70' | Report | Flores (yellow card) 2'; Callejón (yellow card) 42' (goal) 71' (pen.); Eguino (yellow card) 57' | Stadium: La Bombonera; Referee: Víctor Carrillo (Peru) |

| April 13, 2016 5 | Racing (Argentina) | 0–1 | (Argentina) Boca Juniors | Avellaneda, Argentina |
| 21:45 UTC−3 | Videla (yellow card) 0' | Report | Insaurralde (yellow card) 32'; Peruzzi (yellow card) 69'; Gago (yellow card) 82'; Lodeiro 83' (yellow card) 84'; Orion (yellow card) 90+1' | Stadium: Estadio Presidente Juan Domingo Perón, Referee: Carlos Vera (Ecuador) |

| April 20, 2016 6 | Boca Juniors (Argentina) | 6–2 | (Colombia) Deportivo Cali | Buenos Aires, Argentina |
| 19:30 UTC−3 | Fabra 16'; Tevez 38', 71'; Cubas (yellow card) 38'; Chávez 47'; Jara 78'; Palacios 86' | Report | Mera (yellow card) 30' (yellow-red card) 69'; Casierra 35', 37' | Stadium: La Bombonera; Referee: Christian Ferreyra (Uruguay) |

==== Final stages ====
===== Round of 16 =====
| April 28, 2016 First leg | Cerro Porteño (Paraguay) | 1–2 | (Argentina) Boca Juniors | Asunción, Paraguay |
| 20:45 UTC−4 | Leal (penalty missed) 55'; J. Rojas (yellow card) 79'; Domínguez 83' (pen.); Alonso (yellow card) 84'; R. Rojas (yellow card) 90+1' | Report | Tevez 28'; Lodeiro 59'; Meli (yellow card) 70' | Stadium: Estadio Defensores del Chaco; Referee: Francisco Chacón (Mexico) |

| May 5, 2016 Second leg | Boca Juniors (Argentina) | 3–1 (5–2 agg.) | (Paraguay) Cerro Porteño | Buenos Aires, Argentina |
| 21:45 UTC−3 | Tevez 3' (pen.); Insaurralde (yellow card) 39'; Pavón (yellow card) 61' (goal) 72'; Pérez 88' | Report | R. Rojas 12' (yellow card) 81'; Valdez (yellow card) 26' (yellow-red card) 85' | Stadium: La Bombonera; Referee: Wilton Sampaio (Brazil) |

===== Quarterfinals =====
| May 12, 2016 First leg | Nacional (Uruguay) | 1–1 | (Argentina) Boca Juniors | Montevideo, Uruguay |
| 19:30 UTC−3 | Tabó (yellow card) 51'; Fernández 75' | Report | Fabra (yellow card) 21' (goal) 69'; Tevez (yellow card) 90+3' | Stadium: Gran Parque Central; Referee: Enrique Cáceres (Paraguay) |

| May 19, 2016 Second leg | Boca Juniors (Argentina) | 1–1 (2–2 agg.) (4–3 p) | (Uruguay) Nacional | Buenos Aires, Argentina |
| 20:15 UTC−3 | Insaurralde (yellow card) 17'; Tevez (yellow card) 25'; Pérez (yellow card) 28'; Pavón (yellow card) 66' (yellow-red card) 72' (goal) 72' | Report | Romero (yellow card) 6'; Díaz 20' (o.g.); Porras (yellow card) 29' | Stadium: La Bombonera; Referee: Héber Lopes (Brazil) |
| | Penalties |
| | Tevez (penalty scored); Díaz (penalty scored); Pérez (penalty missed); Insaurralde (penalty missed); Fabra (penalty scored); Carrizo (penalty scored) | | (penalty scored) Polenta; (penalty scored) Victorino; (penalty scored) Fernández; (penalty missed) Porras; (penalty missed) Romero; (penalty missed) Carballo |

== Team statistics ==
| | Total | Home | Away | Neutral |
|---|---|---|---|---|
| Games played | 27 | 13 | 13 | 1 |
| Games won | 10 | 7 | 3 | 0 |
| Games drawn | 10 | 5 | 5 | 0 |
| Games lost | 7 | 1 | 5 | 1 |
| Biggest win | 6-2 vs Deportivo Cali | 6-2 vs Deportivo Cali | 1-0 vs San Martín (SJ); 1-0 vs Racing | None |
| Biggest loss | 0-4 vs San Lorenzo | 0-1 vs Atlético Tucumán | 0-2 vs Lanús; 0-2 vs Tigre; 1-3 vs Estudiantes (LP) | 0-4 vs San Lorenzo |
| Biggest win (Primera División) | 4-1 vs Newell's Old Boys; 3-0 vs Atlético de Rafaela; 4-1 vs Aldosivi | 4-1 vs Newell's Old Boys; 3-0 vs Atlético de Rafaela | 1-0 vs San Martín (SJ) | None |
| Biggest win (Supercopa Argentina) | None | | | |
| Biggest win (Copa Libertadores) | 6-2 vs Deportivo Cali | 6-2 vs Deportivo Cali | 1-0 vs Racing; 2-1 vs Cerro Porteño | None |
| Biggest loss (Primera División) | 0-2 vs Lanús; 0-2 vs Tigre; 1-3 vs Estudiantes (LP) | 0-1 vs Atlético Tucumán | 0-2 vs Lanús; 0-2 vs Tigre; 1-3 vs Estudiantes (LP) | None |
| Biggest loss (Supercopa Argentina) | 0-4 vs San Lorenzo | None | | 0-4 vs San Lorenzo |
| Biggest loss (Copa Libertadores) | None | | | |
| Clean sheets | 11 | 6 | 5 | 0 |
| Goals scored | 33 | 26 | 7 | 0 |
| Goals conceded | 25 | 9 | 12 | 4 |
| Goal difference | 8 | 17 | -5 | -4 |
| Yellow cards | 67 | 28 | 36 | 3 |
| Red cards | 2 | 2 | 0 | 0 |
| Top scorer | Tevez (9) | Tevez (7) | Tevez; Lodeiro (2) | None |
| Worst discipline | Pérez; Pavón (1 RC) | Pérez; Pavón (1 RC) | None | None |
| Penalties for | 2 | 2 | 0 | 0 |
| Penalties against | 4 | 2 | 2 | 0 |

=== Season Appearances and goals ===
Last updated on May 22, 2016

| No. | Pos | Nat | Player | Total | | Primera División | | Supercopa Argentina | | Copa Libertadores | |
| No. | Pos | Nat | Player | Apps | Goals | Apps | Goals | Apps | Goals | Apps | Goals |
Goalkeepers
| 1 | GK | (Argentina) ARG | Agustín Orion | 22 | -19 | 12 | -9 | 1 | -4 | 9 | -6 |
| 23 | GK | (Argentina) ARG | Ramiro Martínez | 0 | 0 | 0 | 0 | 0 | 0 | 0 | 0 |
| 31 | GK | (Argentina) ARG | Guillermo Sara | 6 | -6 | 4+1 | -4 | 0 | 0 | 1 | -2 |
Defenders
| 2 | DF | (Argentina) ARG | Daniel Díaz | 18 | 0 | 7+1 | 0 | 1 | 0 | 9 | 0 |
| 3 | DF | (Argentina) ARG | Jonathan Silva | 21 | 1 | 15 | 1 | 1 | 0 | 2+3 | 0 |
| 4 | DF | (Argentina) ARG | Gino Peruzzi | 10 | 0 | 3 | 0 | 1 | 0 | 6 | 0 |
| 6 | DF | (Argentina) ARG | Fernando Tobio | 17 | 0 | 12 | 0 | 1 | 0 | 1+3 | 0 |
| 13 | DF | (Uruguay) URU | Alexis Rolín | 4 | 0 | 3 | 0 | 0 | 0 | 1 | 0 |
| 24 | DF | (Colombia) COL | Frank Fabra | 10 | 2 | 2 | 0 | 0 | 0 | 8 | 2 |
| 26 | DF | (Argentina) ARG | Pedro Silva Torrejón | 2 | 0 | 0+2 | 0 | 0 | 0 | 0 | 0 |
| 33 | DF | (Argentina) ARG | Juan Manuel Insaurralde | 22 | 0 | 12 | 0 | 1 | 0 | 9 | 0 |
| 35 | DF | (Argentina) ARG | Nahuel Molina Lucero | 9 | 0 | 8 | 0 | 0 | 0 | 1 | 0 |
Midfielders
| 5 | MF | (Argentina) ARG | Fernando Gago | 18 | 1 | 9+2 | 0 | 0+1 | 0 | 6 | 1 |
| 8 | MF | (Argentina) ARG | Pablo Pérez | 19 | 1 | 8+2 | 0 | 1 | 0 | 7+1 | 1 |
| 11 | MF | (Argentina) ARG | Federico Carrizo | 14 | 3 | 5+3 | 1 | 0 | 0 | 4+2 | 2 |
| 14 | MF | (Uruguay) URU | Nicolás Lodeiro | 17 | 5 | 6+3 | 3 | 0+1 | 0 | 6+1 | 2 |
| 15 | MF | (Argentina) ARG | Gonzalo Maroni | 1 | 0 | 0+1 | 0 | 0 | 0 | 0 | 0 |
| 17 | MF | (Argentina) ARG | César Meli | 21 | 0 | 4+6 | 0 | 1 | 0 | 6+4 | 0 |
| 18 | MF | (Argentina) ARG | Nicolás Colazo | 4 | 0 | 3+1 | 0 | 0 | 0 | 0 | 0 |
| 20 | MF | (Argentina) ARG | Adrián Cubas | 11 | 0 | 5+1 | 0 | 1 | 0 | 4 | 0 |
| 21 | MF | (Argentina) ARG | Cristian Erbes | 4 | 0 | 2 | 0 | 0 | 0 | 2 | 0 |
| 28 | MF | (Argentina) ARG | Alexis Messidoro | 5 | 1 | 4+1 | 1 | 0 | 0 | 0 | 0 |
| 29 | MF | (Argentina) ARG | Leonardo Jara | 15 | 1 | 8+1 | 0 | 0 | 0 | 5+1 | 1 |
| 30 | MF | (Uruguay) URU | Rodrigo Bentancur | 15 | 1 | 9+2 | 1 | 0 | 0 | 1+3 | 0 |
| 40 | MF | (Argentina) ARG | Julián Chicco | 3 | 0 | 3 | 0 | 0 | 0 | 0 | 0 |
Forwards
| 7 | FW | (Argentina) ARG | Cristian Pavón | 10 | 2 | 2+1 | 0 | 0 | 0 | 7 | 2 |
| 9 | FW | (Italy) ITA | Daniel Osvaldo | 5 | 0 | 3 | 0 | 0+1 | 0 | 0+1 | 0 |
| 10 | FW | (Argentina) ARG | Carlos Tevez | 22 | 9 | 10+1 | 4 | 1 | 0 | 10 | 5 |
| 16 | FW | (Argentina) ARG | Nicolás Benegas | 4 | 0 | 2+2 | 0 | 0 | 0 | 0 | 0 |
| 25 | FW | (Argentina) ARG | Andrés Chávez | 21 | 4 | 4+8 | 3 | 1 | 0 | 4+4 | 1 |
| 34 | FW | (Argentina) ARG | Sebastián Palacios | 19 | 2 | 12+1 | 1 | 0 | 0 | 1+5 | 1 |

=== Top scorers ===
Last updated on May 22, 2016

| Rank | Pos. | No. | Name | Primera División | Supercopa Argentina | Copa Libertadores | Total |
|---|---|---|---|---|---|---|---|
| 1 | FW | 10 | (Argentina) Carlos Tevez | 4 | — | 5 | 9 |
| 2 | MF | 14 | (Uruguay) Nicolás Lodeiro | 3 | — | 2 | 5 |
| 3 | FW | 25 | (Argentina) Andrés Chávez | 3 | — | 1 | 4 |
| 4 | MF | 11 | (Argentina) Federico Carrizo | 1 | — | 2 | 3 |
| 5 | FW | 7 | (Argentina) Cristian Pavón | | — | 2 | 2 |
| 6 | DF | 24 | (Colombia) Frank Fabra | | — | 2 | 2 |
| 7 | FW | 34 | (Argentina) Sebastián Palacios | 1 | — | 1 | 2 |
| 8 | MF | 30 | (Uruguay) Rodrigo Bentancur | 1 | — | | 1 |
| 9 | DF | 3 | (Argentina) Jonathan Silva | 1 | — | | 1 |
| 10 | MF | 5 | (Argentina) Fernando Gago | | — | 1 | 1 |
| 11 | MF | 28 | (Argentina) Alexis Messidoro | 1 | — | | 1 |
| 12 | MF | 29 | (Argentina) Leonardo Jara | | — | 1 | 1 |
| 13 | MF | 8 | (Argentina) Pablo Pérez | | — | 1 | 1 |
| Own goals | | | | | — | | |
| Total | | | | 15 | — | 18 | 33 |

=== Top assists ===
Last updated on May 22, 2016

| Rank | Pos. | No. | Name | Primera División | Supercopa Argentina | Copa Libertadores | Total |
|---|---|---|---|---|---|---|---|
| 1 | FW | 10 | (Argentina) Carlos Tevez | 2 | — | 1 | 3 |
| 2 | MF | 29 | (Argentina) Leonardo Jara | 1 | — | 1 | 2 |
| 3 | MF | 8 | (Argentina) Pablo Pérez | 1 | — | 1 | 2 |
| 4 | MF | 17 | (Argentina) César Meli | 1 | — | 1 | 2 |
| 5 | MF | 11 | (Argentina) Federico Carrizo | 1 | — | | 1 |
| 6 | DF | 35 | (Argentina) Nahuel Molina Lucero | 1 | — | | 1 |
| 7 | FW | 7 | (Argentina) Cristian Pavón | | — | 1 | 1 |
| 8 | FW | 25 | (Argentina) Andrés Chávez | | — | 1 | 1 |
| 9 | DF | 24 | (Colombia) Frank Fabra | | — | 1 | 1 |
| 10 | FW | 34 | (Argentina) Sebastián Palacios | 1 | — | | 1 |
| Total | | | | 8 | — | 7 | 15 |

=== Penalties ===
| Date | Penalty Taker | Scored | Opponent | Competition |
|---|---|---|---|---|
| May 5, 2016 | Carlos Tevez | Yes | Cerro Porteño | Copa Libertadores |
| May 22, 2016 | Federico Carrizo | No | Defensa y Justicia | Primera División |

=== Clean sheets ===
Last updated on May 22, 2016

| Rank | Pos. | No. | Name | Primera División | Supercopa Argentina | Copa Libertadores | Total |
|---|---|---|---|---|---|---|---|
| 1 | GK | 1 | (Argentina) Agustín Orion | 5 | — | 3 | 8 |
| 2 | GK | 31 | (Argentina) Guillermo Sara | 3 | — | | 3 |
| Total | | | | 8 | — | 3 | 11 |

=== Disciplinary record ===
Last updated on May 22, 2016

| No. | Pos | Nat | Name | Primera División | | | Supercopa Argentina | | | Copa Libertadores | | | Total | | |
| No. | Pos | Nat | Name | Booked | (yellow card) (yellow-red card) | Sent off (straight red) | Booked | (yellow card) (yellow-red card) | Sent off (straight red) | Booked | (yellow card) (yellow-red card) | Sent off (straight red) | Booked | (yellow card) (yellow-red card) | Sent off (straight red) |
Goalkeepers
| 1 | GK | (Argentina) | Agustín Orion | 1 | | | | | | 1 | | | 2 | | |
| 23 | GK | (Argentina) | Ramiro Martínez | | | | | | | | | | | | |
| 31 | GK | (Argentina) | Guillermo Sara | | | | | | | | | | | | |
Defenders
| 2 | DF | (Argentina) | Daniel Díaz | 3 | | | | | | 1 | | | 4 | | |
| 3 | DF | (Argentina) | Jonathan Silva | 2 | | | 1 | | | 2 | | | 5 | | |
| 4 | DF | (Argentina) | Gino Peruzzi | 1 | | | | | | 1 | | | 2 | | |
| 6 | DF | (Argentina) | Fernando Tobio | 4 | | | | | | | | | 4 | | |
| 13 | DF | (Uruguay) | Alexis Rolín | 1 | | | | | | | | | 1 | | |
| 24 | DF | (Colombia) | Frank Fabra | | | | | | | 2 | | | 2 | | |
| 26 | DF | (Argentina) | Pedro Silva Torrejón | | | | | | | | | | | | |
| 33 | DF | (Argentina) | Juan Manuel Insaurralde | 4 | | | | | | 5 | | | 9 | | |
| 35 | DF | (Argentina) | Nahuel Molina Lucero | | | | | | | | | | | | |
Midfielders
| 5 | MF | (Argentina) | Fernando Gago | 3 | | | | | | 1 | | | 4 | | |
| 8 | MF | (Argentina) | Pablo Pérez | 5 | | 1 | 1 | | | 3 | | | 9 | | 1 |
| 11 | MF | (Argentina) | Federico Carrizo | 1 | | | | | | | | | 1 | | |
| 14 | MF | (Uruguay) | Nicolás Lodeiro | 1 | | | | | | 1 | | | 2 | | |
| 15 | MF | (Argentina) | Gonzalo Maroni | | | | | | | | | | | | |
| 17 | MF | (Argentina) | César Meli | | | | | | | 2 | | | 2 | | |
| 18 | MF | (Argentina) | Nicolás Colazo | | | | | | | | | | | | |
| 20 | MF | (Argentina) | Adrián Cubas | 1 | | | 1 | | | 1 | | | 3 | | |
| 21 | MF | (Argentina) | Cristian Erbes | 1 | | | | | | | | | 1 | | |
| 28 | MF | (Argentina) | Alexis Messidoro | 1 | | | | | | | | | 1 | | |
| 29 | MF | (Argentina) | Leonardo Jara | 1 | | | | | | | | | 1 | | |
| 30 | MF | (Uruguay) | Rodrigo Bentancur | 2 | | | | | | | | | 2 | | |
| 40 | MF | (Argentina) | Julián Chicco | 1 | | | | | | | | | 1 | | |
Forwards
| 7 | FW | (Argentina) | Cristian Pavón | | | | | | | 3 | 1 | | 3 | 1 | |
| 9 | FW | (Italy) | Daniel Osvaldo | | | | | | | | | | | | |
| 10 | FW | (Argentina) | Carlos Tevez | 1 | | | | | | 3 | | | 4 | | |
| 16 | FW | (Argentina) | Nicolás Benegas | | | | | | | | | | | | |
| 25 | FW | (Argentina) | Andrés Chávez | 2 | | | | | | | | | 2 | | |
| 34 | FW | (Argentina) | Sebastián Palacios | 2 | | | | | | 1 | | | 3 | | |
| Total | | | | 38 | | 1 | 3 | | | 26 | | | 67 | 1 | 1 |
