= Óscar Benítez =

Óscar Benítez may refer to:

- Óscar Benítez (footballer, born 1948), Salvadoran footballer and football manager
- Óscar Benítez (footballer, born 1993), Argentine football winger for Atlético Tucumán
