= Nicolás Benegas =

Argentine footballer

Personal information
- Full name: Gabriel Nicolás Benegas
- Date of birth: 1 March 1996 (age 30)
- Place of birth: Eldorado, Argentina
- Height: 1.86 m (6 ft 1 in)
- Position: Centre-forward

Team information
- Current team: Deportivo Riestra
- Number: 8

Youth career
- Vicov
- 2015–2016: Boca Juniors

Senior career*
Years	Team	Apps	(Gls)
2016–2018	Boca Juniors	4	(0)
2016–2017	→ Quilmes (loan)	18	(1)
2017–2018	→ San Martín T. (loan)	12	(0)
2018–2019	Brown de Adrogué	24	(5)
2019–2021	Defensores de Belgrano	29	(7)
2021–2022	Seoul E-Land	23	(6)
2022	Sol de América	13	(1)
2022–2026	Defensores de Belgrano	47	(23)
2024–2025	→ Deportivo Riestra (loan)	64	(7)
2026–	Deportivo Riestra	22	(1)
- * Club domestic league appearances and goals as of 17:37, 13 November 2026 (UTC)

Gabriel Nicolás Benegas (born 1 March 1996) is an Argentine professional footballer who currently plays for Deportivo Riestra.

== Career ==
Benegas played for Vicov and Boca Juniors in his youth career. He first played for Boca's senior squad during the 2016 Argentine Primera División season, making his debut in a defeat to Argentinos Juniors. He subsequently participated in Boca's final three fixtures of the season.

In July 2016, Benegas joined fellow Primera División outfit Quilmes on loan. His Quilmes debut came on 10 September against Huracán. In his third appearance, Benegas scored his first career goal versus Olimpo.

In August 2017, Benegas was loaned out to Primera B Nacional team San Martín. Almost a year later, Brown signed Benegas.

After five goals in twenty-seven matches for Brown, Benegas moved across the second tier to Defensores de Belgrano. He scored five times in the curtailed 2019–20, including twice against former club Quilmes.

On 18 February 2021, Benegas headed to South Korea to join K League 2 side Seoul E-Land FC; penning terms until 2023. There was also an offer from an unnamed Spanish club, though he chose the Korean team out of sincerity. He debuted on 28 February in a win against Busan IPark, coming off the bench to replace Lee Geon-hui. He then netted twice on his second appearance against Gimcheon Sangmu on 6 March. After a spell at Paraguayan club Sol de América in early 2022, Benegas returned to his former club, Defensores de Belgrano, on 3 June 2022.

== Career statistics ==
As of 28 December 2021.

Club statistics
Club	Season	League			Cup		League Cup		Continental		Other		Total	
Club	Season	Division	Apps	Goals	Apps	Goals	Apps	Goals	Apps	Goals	Apps	Goals	Apps	Goals
Boca Juniors	2016	Primera División	4	0	0	0	—		0	0	0	0	4	0
Boca Juniors	2016–17	Primera División	0	0	0	0	—		0	0	0	0	0	0
Boca Juniors	2017–18	Primera División	0	0	0	0	—		0	0	0	0	0	0
Boca Juniors	Total		4	0	0	0	—		0	0	0	0	4	0
Quilmes (loan)	2016–17	Primera División	18	1	2	0	—		—		0	0	20	1
San Martín (loan)	2017–18	Primera B Nacional	12	0	0	0	—		—		0	0	12	0
Brown	2018–19	Primera B Nacional	24	5	3	0	—		—		0	0	27	5
Defensores de Belgrano	2019–20	Primera B Nacional	20	5	0	0	—		—		0	0	20	5
Defensores de Belgrano	2020	Primera B Nacional	9	2	0	0	—		—		0	0	9	2
Defensores de Belgrano	Total		29	7	5	0	—		—		0	0	29	7
Seoul E-Land FC	2021	K League 2	23	6	1	0	—		—		0	0	17	2
Seoul E-Land FC	Total		23	6	1	0	—		—		0	0	24	6
Club Sol de América	2022	Paraguayan Primera División	0	0	0	0	—		—		0	0	0	0
Career total			110	19	6	0	—		0	0	0	0	109	15
