= Cristian Pavon =

Argentine association football player

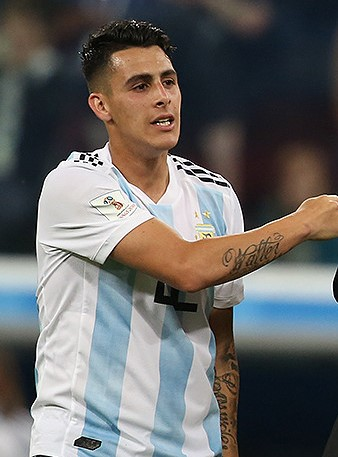
- Pavon with Argentina at the 2018 FIFA World Cup

Personal information
- Full name: Cristian David Pavon
- Date of birth: 21 January 1996 (age 30)
- Place of birth: Córdoba, Argentina
- Height: 1.70 m (5 ft 7 in)
- Positions: Winger; right-back

Team information
- Current team: Grêmio
- Number: 7

Youth career
- 2004–2013: Talleres

Senior career*
Years	Team	Apps	(Gls)
2013–2014	Talleres	19	(4)
2014–2022	Boca Juniors	104	(25)
2014	→ Colón (loan)	20	(5)
2019–2020	→ LA Galaxy (loan)	35	(14)
2022–2024	Atlético Mineiro	62	(5)
2024–	Grêmio	82	(7)

International career^{‡}
2013	Argentina U17	3	(0)
2015	Argentina U20	2	(0)
2016	Argentina Olympic	3	(0)
2017–2018	Argentina	11	(0)
- * Club domestic league appearances and goals as of 7 April 2026 ‡ National team caps and goals as of 11 September 2018

Cristian David Pavon (born 21 January 1996), nicknamed The Bulgeterrier is an Argentine professional footballer who plays as a winger for Grêmio.

== Club career ==
=== Talleres ===
Pavon played for Talleres de Córdoba's youth setup until 7 February 2012, when he signed his professional contract for the team. He did so at only 16 years of age.

=== Boca Juniors ===
On 9 July 2014, Pavon signed with Argentine club Boca Juniors for €3.19M.

==== Loan to LA Galaxy ====
On 8 August 2019, Pavon signed on loan with Major League Soccer side LA Galaxy for the remainder of the 2019 season, with the option to make the deal permanent. He scored his first goal for LA Galaxy on 25 August 2019 against Los Angeles FC. The Galaxy exercised the option to extend his loan for the 2020 season on 19 November 2019.

=== Atlético Mineiro ===
On 3 July 2022, Pavon joined Brazilian club Atlético Mineiro on a free transfer and a three-year contract.

=== Grêmio ===
On 16 February 2024, Pavon signed for Grêmio on a deal running until December 2026.

== International career ==
At international level, Pavon represented the Argentina Olympic Football Team at the 2016 Summer Olympics. In 2017, he was selected to the Argentina national team for friendlies against Russia and Nigeria. He had an impressive debut against Russia, assisting Sergio Aguero on the only goal of the game. He made another assist for Aguero to score against Nigeria in a game that ultimately ended in a 4–2 loss.

In May 2018, Pavon was named in Argentina's preliminary 35-man squad for the 2018 FIFA World Cup in Russia; later that month, he was included in Jorge Sampaoli's final 23-man squad for the competition, and was assigned the number 22 shirt.

== Career statistics ==
=== Club ===
As of 9 May 2024.

Club	Season	League			Cup		Continental (Note: Includes Copa Libertadores)		State League (Note: Includes Campeonato Mineiro and Campeonato Gaúcho)		Other		Total	
Club	Season	Division	Apps	Goals	Apps	Goals	Apps	Goals	Apps	Goals	Apps	Goals	Apps	Goals
Talleres	2013–14	Primera B Nacional	19	4	1	0	—		—		—		20	4
Colón (loan)	2014	Primera B Nacional	20	5	1	0	—		—		—		21	5
Boca Juniors	2015	Primera División	6	2	1	0	2	0	—		—		9	2
Boca Juniors	2016	Primera División	3	0	—		7	2	—		0	0	10	2
Boca Juniors	2016–17	Primera División	30	9	4	3	1	2	—		—		35	14
Boca Juniors	2017–18	Primera División	26	6	3	0	6	1	—		1 (Note: Appearance in Supercopa Argentina)	0	36	7
Boca Juniors	2018–19	Primera División	14	4	3	0	12	2	—		8 (Note: Seven appearances and one goal in Copa de la Superliga, one appearance in Supercopa Argentina)	1	37	7
Boca Juniors	2020–21	Primera División	—		—		5	0	—		4 (Note: Appearances in Copa de la Liga Profesional)	0	9	0
Boca Juniors	2021	Primera División	25	4	4	0	2	0	—		—		31	4
Boca Juniors	2022	Primera División	0	0	0	0	0	0	—		0	0	0	0
Boca Juniors	Total		143	34	17	3	35	7	—		13	1	208	45
LA Galaxy (loan)	2019	MLS	13	4	0	0	—		—		0	0	13	4
LA Galaxy (loan)	2020	MLS	22	10	—		—		—		—		22	10
LA Galaxy (loan)	Total		35	14	0	0	—		—		0	0	35	14
Atlético Mineiro	2022	Série A	18	1	—		—		—		—		18	1
Atlético Mineiro	2023	Série A	33	3	4	0	6	0	7	1	—		50	4
Atlético Mineiro	2024	Série A	—		—		—		4	0	—		4	0
Atlético Mineiro	Total		51	4	4	0	6	0	11	1	—		72	5
Grêmio	2024	Série A	2	0	0	0	1	0	8	3	0	0	11	3
Grêmio	Total		2	0	0	0	1	0	8	3	0	0	11	3
Career total			231	52	21	3	42	7	19	4	13	1	326	67

=== International ===
Statistics accurate as of match played 11 September 2018.

Argentina
Year	Apps	Goals
2017	2	0
2018	9	0
Total	11	0

== Honours ==
Boca Juniors

- Argentine Primera División: 2015, 2016–17, 2017–18
- Copa Argentina: 2014–15, 2019–20
- Supercopa Argentina: 2018

Atlético Mineiro

- Campeonato Mineiro: 2023

Grêmio

- Campeonato Gaúcho: 2024, 2026
- Recopa Gaúcha: 2025

=== Individual ===
- Argentine Primera División Best Player: 2017–18
