= Rodrigo Bentancur =

Uruguayan footballer (born 1997)

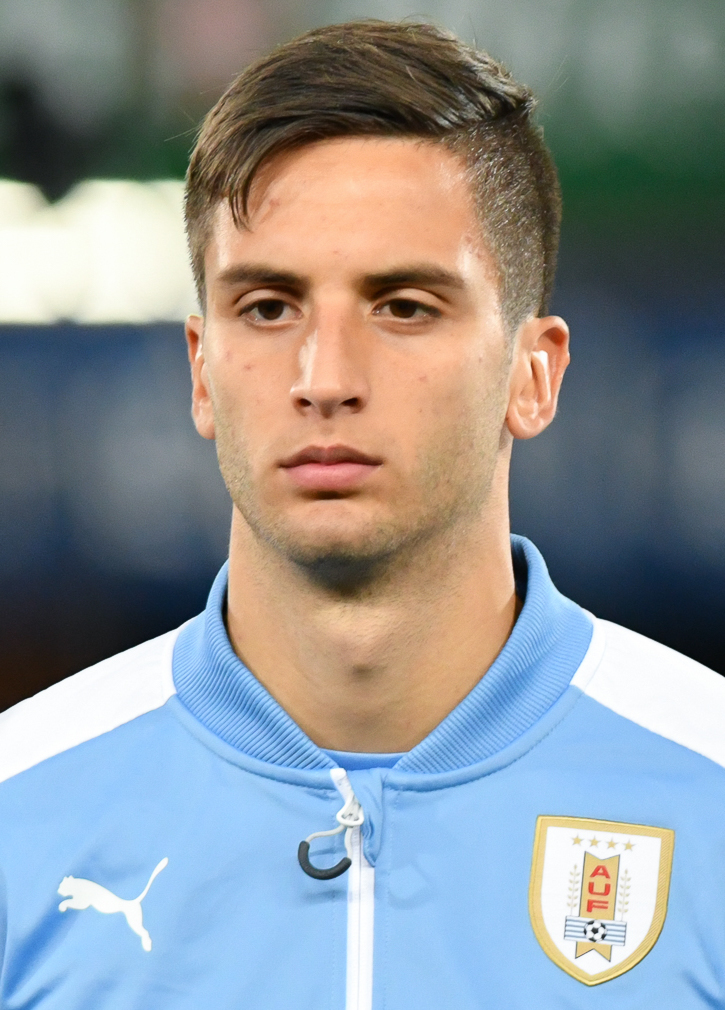
- Bentancur lining up for Uruguay in 2017

Personal information
- Full name: Rodrigo Bentancur Colman
- Date of birth: 25 June 1997 (age 29)
- Place of birth: Nueva Helvecia, Uruguay
- Height: 1.87 m (6 ft 2 in)
- Position: Central midfielder

Team information
- Current team: Tottenham Hotspur
- Number: 30

Youth career
- 2009–2015: Boca Juniors

Senior career*
| Years | Team | Apps | (Gls) |
| 2015–2017 | Boca Juniors | 51 | (1) |
| 2017–2022 | Juventus | 133 | (2) |
| 2022– | Tottenham Hotspur | 115 | (9) |

International career^{‡}
| 2016–2017 | Uruguay U20 | 14 | (1) |
| 2017– | Uruguay | 82 | (3) |
Medal record
Men's football
Representing Uruguay
Copa América
| Third place | 2024 United States |
South American U-20 Championship
| Winner | 2017 Ecuador |
- * Club domestic league appearances and goals as of 23:23, 19 September 2026 (UTC) ‡ National team caps and goals as of 01:50, 18 November 2026 (UTC)

Rodrigo Bentancur Colman (born 25 June 1997) is a Uruguayan professional footballer who plays as a central midfielder for Premier League club Tottenham Hotspur and the Uruguay national team.

Bentancur started his career in the youth system of Argentine side Boca Juniors in 2009. He was promoted to the senior squad in 2015, winning two Primera División titles and a Copa Argentina with the team. He was then signed by Italian club Juventus in 2017, where he won three consecutive Serie A titles, among other trophies. In January 2022, Bentancur joined English side Tottenham Hotspur, winning the UEFA Europa League three and a half seasons later.

At international level, Bentancur was a member of the Uruguay U20 squad that won the 2017 South American U-20 Championship. He made his senior debut for Uruguay in 2017, representing the side at the FIFA World Cup in 2018, 2022 and 2026, and the Copa América in 2019, 2021 and 2024.

== Early life ==
Bentancur was born on 25 June 1997 in Nueva Helvecia, Colonia to Roberto Bentancur and Mary Colmán. He has a younger brother, Damián, and was nicknamed Lolo growing up as Damián couldn't pronounce Rodrigo as a child. Bentancur is of Irish, Spanish, and Swiss descent.

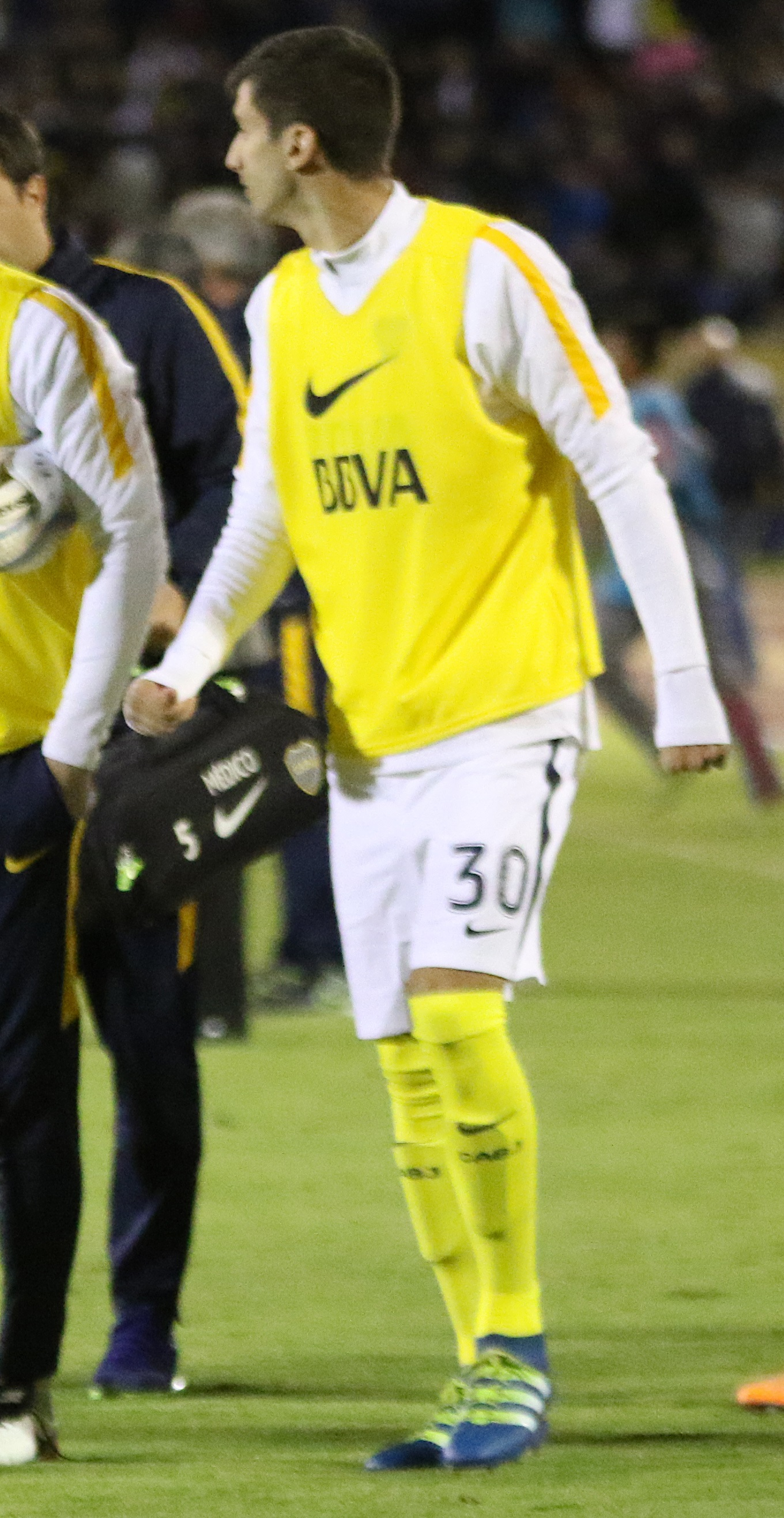
Bentancur training with Boca Juniors in 2016

When Bentancur was four years of age, his mother died of an undisclosed illness. Thereafter, he wore the number 30 shirt in her honour; an homage of her birthday. Roberto eventually remarried to Cecilia Agredi, an Argentine of Italian descent. Together, the two bore female twins, Cande and Mica, Rodrigo and Damián's half-sisters.

Passionate about football since childhood, Bentancur eventually enrolled in Boca Juniors youth academy in 2009 after Horacio Anselmi, a longtime representative for the club, scouted him.

== Club career ==
=== Boca Juniors ===
On 12 April 2015, he made his first team debut for the Boca Juniors in a league game against Nueva Chicago. He replaced Pablo Pérez after 77 minutes in a 0–0 home draw. His stint at Boca is mainly remembered for his significant mistake against San Lorenzo, when he passed the ball to a rival forward (Mauro Matos) who then easily scored a last-minute victory goal that put his team at the top of the league, above Boca (in spite of this, they ended up winning the 2015 Argentine Primera División). He would make a similar mistake some years later, this time playing for Juventus, with a back-pass blunder inside his own penalty area which put his team one nil down in the first seconds of the game, in the 2020–21 UEFA Champions League Round of 16 (they ended up being eliminated due to the away goals rule).

On 13 July 2015, Bentancur, Guido Vadalá, Franco Cristaldo and Adrián Cubas became part of Carlos Tevez's deal, which saw Juventus have the first option to sign the youngsters until 20 April 2017, with Vadalá also joining Juventus on loan for the 2015–2017 seasons. Bentancur was tagged for €9.4 million. Juventus's CEO Giuseppe Marotta later confirmed that Juventus would be exercising their option to sign Bentancur in 2017. He arrived in Turin on 3 April 2017 and completed his medical on the same day. On 21 April 2017 Juventus completed their acquisition of Bentancur, signing him on a five-year deal effective from 1 July 2017 until 30 June 2022 for a €9.5 million transfer fee, plus additional performance based bonuses. Boca Juniors are also entitled to 50% of any future transfer fee that Juventus receive for Bentancur. Bentancur subsequently returned to Argentina to play out the remainder of the 2016–17 season with Boca Juniors.

=== Juventus ===
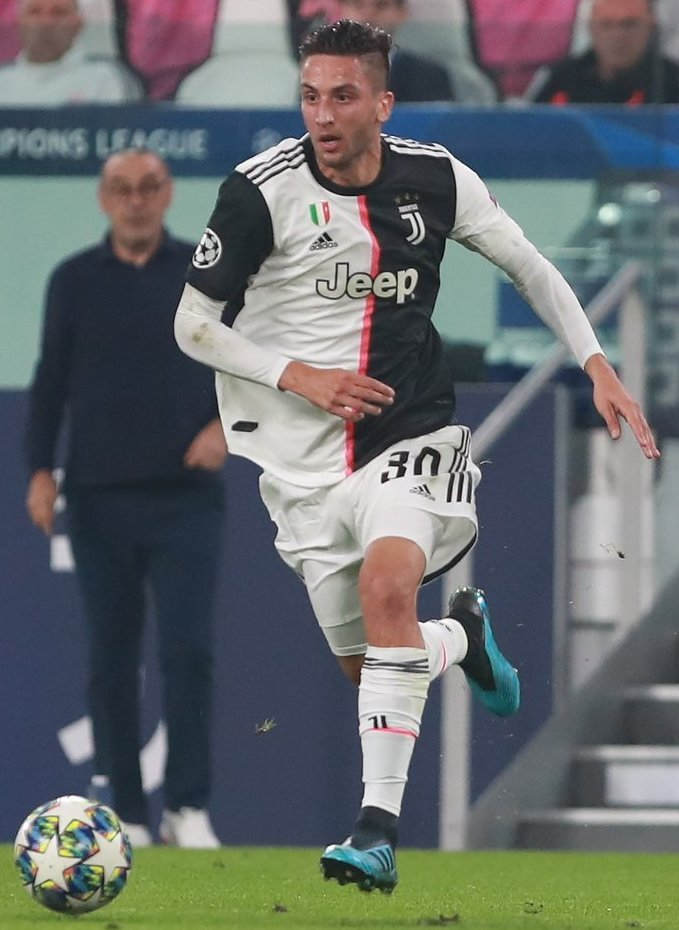
Bentancur playing for Juventus in 2019

Bentancur formally became a player of Juventus on 1 July 2017, after the club activated the option to sign him in April 2017, in a deal which would keep him at the club until 2022. The first option to sign Bentancur was bought as part of Carlos Tevez's deal in July 2015. He made his club debut on 26 August 2017, coming on as a substitute in a 4–2 away win over Genoa in Serie A. On 6 October 2018, Bentancur scored his first goal for the club in a 2–0 away win over Udinese in Serie A. During his time with the club, Italian newspapers nicknamed him as Principe.

=== Tottenham Hotspur ===
On 31 January 2022, Bentancur joined Premier League club Tottenham Hotspur for an undisclosed fee. Bentancur made his debut for Spurs on 5 February in the FA Cup match against Brighton & Hove Albion, coming on as a substitute in the match that finished in a 3–1 win. He made his Premier League debut nine days later, coming on as a substitute for Pierre-Emile Højbjerg in a 2–3 loss against Southampton.

On 18 September 2022, Bentancur scored his first goal for the club in a Premier League game against Leicester City, the third goal in a 6–2 victory at the Tottenham Hotspur Stadium. Later on in the season, Bentancur scored his first UEFA Champions League goal in a group stage match – an equaliser against Sporting CP. The match ended 1–1. He continued his goal-scoring form in Spurs' league fixture three days later, coming off the bench to score an injury-time winner against AFC Bournemouth, completing a 3–2 comeback after they had gone 2–0 down. Two weeks later he registered his first brace in the Premier League, with two late goals against Leeds United to secure a 4–3 victory for Spurs.

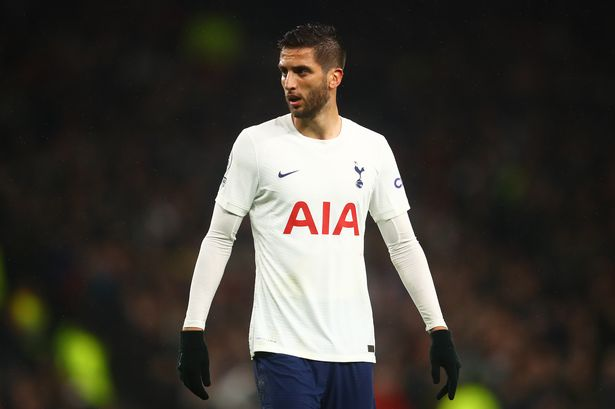
Bentancur playing for Tottenham Hotspur in 2022

On 11 February 2023, Bentancur suffered an anterior cruciate ligament injury during a match against Leicester City, which would rule him out of the team for the rest of the season.

Bentancur eventually made his return on 27 October 2023, coming off the bench late in a 1–2 away win against Crystal Palace in game week 10. However, just a month after his return, on 26 November during a 1–2 defeat against Aston Villa, Bentancur tore his ankle ligaments. Despite being ruled out for 8 to 10 weeks, Bentancur returned against Bournemouth on 31 December 2023, a little over four weeks later. Bentancur captained the side for the first time in a 1–0 FA Cup win over Burnley on 5 January 2024 and he scored his first goal since his return from injury on 15 January 2024, Tottenham's second equaliser in a 2–2 draw away to Manchester United. In November 2024, he received a seven-game suspension and imposed with a fine of £100,000 by the English FA for allegedly making a racist comment toward his teammate Son Heung-min.

On 21 May 2025, he was a member of the Tottenham Hotspur squad that won the UEFA Europa League for the third time in the club's history, defeating Manchester United in the 2025 final.

On 3 October 2025, Bentancur signed a new long-term contract with Tottenham Hotspur.

On 10 October 2026, Bentancur was sent off for violent conduct during a Premier League fixture against Manchester United at Old Trafford during which he headbutted Luke Shaw. Despite his dismissal, Tottenham went on draw 1-1 thanks to a late equaliser from his teammate Dominic Solanke.

== International career ==
Bentancur was a member of Uruguay national under-20 team, winning the 2017 South American U-20 Championship and finishing fourth at the 2017 FIFA U-20 World Cup.

In September 2017, Bentancur received his first senior call-up to the Uruguay national team by manager Óscar Tabárez for the team's upcoming 2018 World Cup qualifiers against Venezuela and Bolivia in October. He made his international debut on 5 October, coming on as a substitute in Uruguay's 0–0 away draw against Venezuela. He was named in the squad for the China Cup in March 2018.

In May 2018, Bentancur was named in Uruguay's provisional 26-man squad for the 2018 FIFA World Cup in Russia. He was later included in the team's final 23-man squad for the tournament. He appeared in Uruguay's opening match of the tournament on 15 June, a 1–0 victory over Egypt at the Yekaterinburg Arena. In the Round of 16 match against Portugal on 30 June, he set-up Edinson Cavani's second goal in an eventual 2–1 victory. Uruguay were eliminated from the tournament following a 2–0 defeat to eventual champions France in the quarter-finals on 6 July.

Bentancur was a member of Uruguay's squads for both the 2019 and 2021 Copas Américas. The team reached the quarter-finals on both occasions, being eliminated by Peru and Colombia respectively, both in penalty shootouts.

On 2 February 2022, Bentancur scored his first goal for Uruguay in a 4–1 win over Venezuela in a 2022 FIFA World Cup qualifier.

In November of the same year, he was named in the final squad for the 2022 FIFA World Cup held in Qatar. He started all three Group H matches for La Celeste but was substituted with an injury in the final fixture against Ghana. Uruguay won the match 2–0 but were eliminated as South Korea beat Portugal to go through to the round of 16 at Uruguay's expense.

In June 2024, Bentancur was named to Uruguay's squad for the 2024 Copa América. In the team's second group match against Bolivia, he came on as a late substitute for Federico Valverde and scored Uruguay's final goal in a 5–0 win. Uruguay reached the semi-finals of the tournament, losing 1–0 to a ten-man Colombia, with Bentancur starting the match, but being substituted part-way through the first half by Guillermo Varela due to injury. In the third-place play-off match, he scored the opening goal in a 2–2 draw against Canada; Uruguay won 4–3 on penalties to capture the bronze medal, with Bentancur netting his team's second spot kick.

On 31 May 2026, Bentancur was named in Uruguay's 26-man squad for the 2026 FIFA World Cup. Uruguay were eliminated in the first round of the tournament following a 1–0 defeat to Spain in their final group match, finishing with only two points following draws against Saudi Arabia and Cape Verde.

== Style of play ==
A dynamic, hard-working, and tactically versatile midfielder, who is comfortable using either foot, Bentancur has been described as a tall and "physically strong" player, who is capable of playing in any midfield position, including as a defensive midfielder, as a central midfielder, as a winger on either flank, in a box-to-box role, or even as a mezzala, or as an attacking midfielder behind the forward, due to his ability to make attacking runs from behind.

He also possesses good close control, technique, and quick footwork, which enable him to get past opponents when in possession, while his vision, intelligence, personality, and incisive passing also allow him to set the tempo of his team's play in a more creative role as a regista deep in midfield, and create goalscoring opportunities for his teammates after winning back the ball. His height and strong frame also enable him to act as a "target man" in an advanced midfield role; he has even played as a second striker on occasion.

== Personal life ==
Bentancur is currently in a long-term relationship with Melany La Banca, an Argentine-Uruguayan from Quilmes, since 2015. They have a daughter.

== Career statistics ==
=== Club ===
As of match played 19 September 2026

Appearances and goals by club, season and competition
| Club | Season | League | | | National cup (Note: Includes Copa Argentina, Coppa Italia, FA Cup) | | League cup (Note: Includes EFL Cup) | | Continental | | Other | | Total | |
| Club | Season | Division | Apps | Goals | Apps | Goals | Apps | Goals | Apps | Goals | Apps | Goals | Apps | Goals |
|---|---|---|---|---|---|---|---|---|---|---|---|---|---|---|
| Boca Juniors | 2015 | Argentine Primera División | 18 | 0 | 6 | 0 | — | | 1 (Note: Appearance(s) in Copa Libertadores) | 0 | — | | 25 | 0 |
| Boca Juniors | 2016 | Argentine Primera División | 11 | 1 | 3 | 0 | — | | 5 | 0 | — | | 19 | 1 |
| Boca Juniors | 2016–17 | Argentine Primera División | 22 | 0 | 0 | 0 | — | | 0 | 0 | — | | 22 | 0 |
| Boca Juniors | Total | | 51 | 1 | 9 | 0 | — | | 6 | 0 | – | | 66 | 1 |
| Juventus | 2017–18 | Serie A | 20 | 0 | 2 | 0 | — | | 5 (Note: Appearances in UEFA Champions League) | 0 | 0 | 0 | 27 | 0 |
| Juventus | 2018–19 | Serie A | 31 | 2 | 1 | 0 | — | | 7 | 0 | 1 (Note: Appearance in Supercoppa Italiana) | 0 | 40 | 2 |
| Juventus | 2019–20 | Serie A | 30 | 0 | 5 | 1 | — | | 7 | 0 | 1 | 0 | 43 | 1 |
| Juventus | 2020–21 | Serie A | 33 | 0 | 4 | 0 | — | | 7 | 0 | 1 | 0 | 45 | 0 |
| Juventus | 2021–22 | Serie A | 19 | 0 | 1 | 0 | — | | 5 | 0 | 1 | 0 | 26 | 0 |
| Juventus | Total | | 133 | 2 | 13 | 1 | — | | 31 | 0 | 4 | 0 | 181 | 3 |
| Tottenham Hotspur | 2021–22 | Premier League | 17 | 0 | 1 | 0 | — | | — | | — | | 18 | 0 |
| Tottenham Hotspur | 2022–23 | Premier League | 18 | 5 | 1 | 0 | 1 | 0 | 6 | 1 | — | | 26 | 6 |
| Tottenham Hotspur | 2023–24 | Premier League | 23 | 1 | 2 | 0 | 0 | 0 | — | | — | | 25 | 1 |
| Tottenham Hotspur | 2024–25 | Premier League | 26 | 2 | 1 | 0 | 4 | 0 | 13 (Note: Appearances in UEFA Europa League) | 0 | — | | 44 | 2 |
| Tottenham Hotspur | 2025–26 | Premier League | 26 | 1 | 0 | 0 | 2 | 0 | 5 | 0 | 1 (Note: Appearance in UEFA Super Cup) | 0 | 34 | 1 |
| Tottenham Hotspur | 2026–27 | Premier League | 5 | 0 | 0 | 0 | 2 | 0 | — | | — | | 7 | 0 |
| Tottenham Hotspur | Total | | 115 | 9 | 5 | 0 | 9 | 0 | 24 | 1 | 1 | 0 | 154 | 10 |
| Career total | | | 299 | 12 | 27 | 1 | 9 | 0 | 61 | 1 | 5 | 0 | 401 | 14 |

=== International ===
As of match played 17 November 2026

Appearances and goals by national team and year
| National team | Year | Apps | Goals |
|---|---|---|---|
| Uruguay | 2017 | 4 | 0 |
| Uruguay | 2018 | 13 | 0 |
| Uruguay | 2019 | 12 | 0 |
| Uruguay | 2020 | 4 | 0 |
| Uruguay | 2021 | 12 | 0 |
| Uruguay | 2022 | 9 | 1 |
| Uruguay | 2023 | 2 | 0 |
| Uruguay | 2024 | 11 | 2 |
| Uruguay | 2025 | 7 | 0 |
| Uruguay | 2026 | 8 | 0 |
| Total | | 82 | 3 |

Scores and results list Uruguay's goal tally first, score column indicates score after each Bentancur goal.

List of international goals scored by Rodrigo Bentancur
| No. | Date | Venue | Opponent | Score | Result | Competition |
|---|---|---|---|---|---|---|
| 1 | 1 February 2022 | Estadio Centenario, Montevideo, Uruguay | Venezuela | 1–0 | 4–1 | 2022 FIFA World Cup qualification |
| 2 | 27 June 2024 | MetLife Stadium, East Rutherford, United States | Bolivia | 5–0 | 5–0 | 2024 Copa América |
| 3 | 13 July 2024 | Bank of America Stadium, Charlotte, United States | Canada | 1–0 | 2–2 (4–3 p) | 2024 Copa América |

== Honours ==
Boca Juniors

- Argentine Primera División: 2015, 2016–17
- Copa Argentina: 2014–15

Juventus

- Serie A: 2017–18, 2018–19, 2019–20
- Coppa Italia: 2017–18, 2020–21
- Supercoppa Italiana: 2018, 2020

Tottenham Hotspur

- UEFA Europa League: 2024–25

Uruguay U20

- South American Youth Football Championship: 2017

Uruguay

- Copa América third place: 2024
