= Pedro Silva Torrejón =

Argentinian footballer

Personal information
- Full name: Pedro Silva Torrejón
- Date of birth: 25 January 1997 (age 29)
- Place of birth: Laboulaye, Argentina
- Height: 1.70 m (5 ft 7 in)
- Position: Left-back

Team information
- Current team: Gimnasia LP
- Number: 24

Youth career
- 2006–2016: Boca Juniors

Senior career*
Years	Team	Apps	(Gls)
2016–2018	Boca Juniors	2	(0)
2017	→ Middlesbrough U-23 (loan)	3	(0)
2017–2018	→ Olimpo (loan)	7	(1)
2019–2023	Boston River	97	(0)
2023–2025	Panetolikos	48	(4)
2025–	Gimnasia LP	50	(0)
- * Club domestic league appearances and goals as of 17:24, 9 July 2026 (UTC)

Pedro Silva Torrejón (born 25 January 1997) is an Argentine professional footballer who plays as a left-back for Gimnasia LP.

== Career ==
=== Early career ===
Torrejón began his club career at the age of 10 following a successful trial at Boca Juniors. Originally a midfielder, he has since become accustomed to a more defensive role at the instruction of Juan Simón.

=== Boca Juniors ===
On 2 January 2016, Torrejón signed his first professional contract with Boca Juniors, making his debut in a 1–0 defeat to Argentinos Juniors on 30 January 2016.

=== Middlesbrough ===
On 2 February 2017, it was announced that Torrejón would join Middlesbrough on loan for the remainder of the 2016–17 season with an option to buy, serving as reinforcement for the club's U23 side.

=== Boston River ===
On 24 January 2019, Torrejón signed with Uruguayan Primera División club Boston River.

=== Panetolikos ===
On 18 July 2023, Torrejón signed with Greece Super League club Panetolikos, he debuted for Panetolikos on 21 October 2023.

Pedro Silva Torrejón Scored his first goal for Panetolikos in a 3–2 win against Athens Kallithea on 5 December 2023.

On 4 January 2024, Pedro Silva scored his first career hattrick and his first league goal for Panetolikos in a 3:2 home win against Panserraikos.

=== Gimnasia LP ===
On 4 January 2025, Torrejón returned to Argentina to join Gimnasia LP.
