= Victor Salazar =

American businessperson (1911–1985)

Victor Salazar (February 12, 1911 – October 12, 1985) was a New Mexico businessman, Democratic state party official, and state officeholder. Salazar was dubbed the "Second floor Governor" due to his influence in the administration of Governor Tom Mabry, and was later considered a nationwide leader of parole reform in the 1970s.

As a native of New Mexico, Salazar's career began as a precinct chairman and alternate delegate to the 1944 Democratic national convention. In 1946 he was considered the brain trust behind the election of Democrat Tom Mabry as Governor, and afterwards was appointed the Commissioner of the State Bureau of Revenue. According to Politics in New Mexico by Jack E. Holmes, "Salazar was a smart and vigorous administrator and politician, and Governor Mabry tended to turn over much of the dealings with the legislature to Salazar." During this time, New Mexico political columnist Will Harrison dubbed him the "Second floor Governor" because of his power and influence at the Capitol.

Outside the political arena, Salazar was a successful businessman, starting out in petroleum and uranium exploration, then eventually moving onto the insurance and real estate fields. His Albuquerque-based insurance company at one time was considered one of the top agencies in the state. Salazar served as Treasurer for the New Mexico Democratic Party, followed by an unsuccessful run for Lieutenant Governor in 1950. He was rumored to be a running mate with Governor John Burroughs in 1960, but in the end was not. A Democrat campaign cash-raiser, he was also a political advisor to U.S. Senators Dennis Chavez and Clinton Anderson.

One of the biggest moments in Salazar's career came in 1962, when President John F. Kennedy appointed him as special envoy to represent the United States at the inauguration of Colombian President Guillermo Leon Valencia. Salazar, along with Secretary of the Interior Stuart Udall, US Ambassador to Colombia Fulton Freeman, and Librarian of Congress Archibald MacLeish, traveled to Colombia on Air Force One for the weeklong assignment.

On July 9, 1971, New Mexico governor Tom King appointed Salazar as chairman of the newly created State Parole Board, where he led the nation in parole reform. His policy was to inform why prisoners were denied parole, as well as coaching them on how to improve their chances for parole. In his later years, Salazar remained active in politics and business, including serving as president of the Albuquerque Petroleum Association, and director of the Petroleum Association of New Mexico.

Salazar died on October 12, 1985, survived by his wife and four children.
