= Silvio Trucco =

Argentine football referee

- Full name: Silvio Aníbal Trucco
- Born: 18 April 1978 (age 48); Rafaela

Domestic
Years	League	Role

International
Years	League	Role
2013–2022	FIFA listed	Referee

Silvio Aníbal Trucco (born 18 April 1978) is an Argentine football referee.

== Early life ==
Trucco's referee career started in 1999.

== Career ==
Trucco has worked as a video assistant referee.

== Personal life ==
Trucco is the son of Argentine referee Luis Trucco.
