= Elías Umeres =

Argentine footballer

Personal information
- Full name: Ezequiel Elías Umeres
- Date of birth: 10 December 1995 (age 30)
- Place of birth: Cafferata, Argentina
- Height: 1.67 m (5 ft 6 in)
- Position: Midfielder

Team information
- Current team: Cacahuatique
- Number: 6

Youth career
- Estudiantes

Senior career*
Years	Team	Apps	(Gls)
2015–2017	Estudiantes	9	(1)
2018–2019	Plaza Colonia	55	(4)
2020	Guillermo Brown	2	(0)
2020–2021	Plaza Colonia	24	(0)
2022	Rampla Juniors	4	(0)
2022	Acassuso	0	(0)
2024–	Cacahuatique	66	(1)
- * Club domestic league appearances and goals as of 19 November 2026

Ezequiel Elías Umeres (born 10 December 1995) is an Argentine professional footballer who plays as a midfielder for Cacahuatique.

== Career ==
Umeres' career started in 2015 with Estudiantes in the Argentine Primera División. He made his professional debut on 17 April during a 1–1 draw with Rosario Central at the Estadio Julio Humberto Grondona. That was his only appearance in 2015, Umeres went on to make eight more appearances throughout 2016 and 2016–17 for Estudiantes. He failed to feature during 2017–18 and subsequently departed the club in January 2018 to join Uruguayan Segunda División side Plaza Colonia. He scored his first senior goal on 18 August versus Villa Teresa, in a season which ended with promotion to the 2019 Uruguayan Primera División.

After goals against Defensor Sporting and Rampla Juniors in the top-flight for Plaza Colonia as they secured Copa Sudamericana qualification, Umeres returned to Argentina with Guillermo Brown in January 2020. He made two appearances before the league's curtailment due to the COVID-19 pandemic. In October 2020, Umeres rejoined Plaza Colonia.

== Career statistics ==
As of 12 December 2020.

Club statistics
Club	Season	League			Cup		League Cup		Continental		Other		Total	
Club	Season	Division	Apps	Goals	Apps	Goals	Apps	Goals	Apps	Goals	Apps	Goals	Apps	Goals
Estudiantes	2015	Argentine Primera División	1	0	0	0	—		0	0	0	0	1	0
Estudiantes	2016	Argentine Primera División	6	0	0	0	—		0	0	0	0	6	0
Estudiantes	2016–17	Argentine Primera División	2	0	0	0	—		1 (Note: Appearance(s) in the Copa Libertadores)	0	0	0	3	0
Estudiantes	2017–18	Argentine Primera División	0	0	0	0	—		0	0	0	0	0	0
Estudiantes	Total		9	0	0	0	—		1	0	0	0	10	0
Plaza Colonia	2018	Segunda División	24	2	—		—		—		0	0	24	2
Plaza Colonia	2019	Uruguayan Primera División	31	2	—		—		—		0	0	31	2
Plaza Colonia	Total		55	4	—		—		—		0	0	55	4
Guillermo Brown	2019–20	Primera B Nacional	2	0	0	0	—		—		0	0	2	0
Plaza Colonia	2020	Primera División	0	0	—		—		0	0	0	0	0	0
Career total			66	4	0	0	—		1	0	0	0	67	4
