= Óscar Benítez (footballer, born 1993) =

Argentinian footballer

Personal information
- Full name: Óscar Benítez
- Date of birth: 14 January 1993 (age 33)
- Place of birth: Adrogué, Argentina
- Height: 1.83 m (6 ft 0 in)
- Position: Winger

Youth career
- 2010–2012: Lanús

Senior career*
Years	Team	Apps	(Gls)
2012–2016	Lanús	92	(5)
2016–2020	Benfica	0	(0)
2016–2017	→ Braga (loan)	2	(0)
2017–2018	→ Boca Juniors (loan)	23	(3)
2018	→ Argentinos Juniors (loan)	8	(0)
2018–2020	→ Atlético San Luis (loan)	17	(1)
2020	Delfín	18	(1)
2021	Atlético Tucumán	22	(3)
- * Club domestic league appearances and goals as of 21:24, 13 March 2022 (UTC)

Óscar "Junior" Benítez (born 14 January 1993) is an Argentine professional footballer who plays as a winger.

== Club career ==
Born in Adrogué, Buenos Aires, Benítez came through the youth system at Club Atlético Lanús, making his senior debut in 2012 aged 19.

On 6 July 2016, Benítez signed a five-year contract with Portuguese champions Benfica. After joining Braga shortly after on a season-long loan deal, he returned to Benfica in January 2017. Two years later, Benítez joined Atlético San Luis on loan until June 2019.

== Personal life ==
On April 8, 2024, he was sentenced to 5 years in prison after his ex-girlfriend committed suicide.

== Honours ==
Lanús

- Primera División: 2016
- Copa Sudamericana: 2013
- Recopa Sudamericana runner-up: 2014

Benfica

- Supertaça Cândido de Oliveira: 2016

Boca Juniors

- Primera División: 2016–17
