= Federico Carrizo =

Argentine footballer

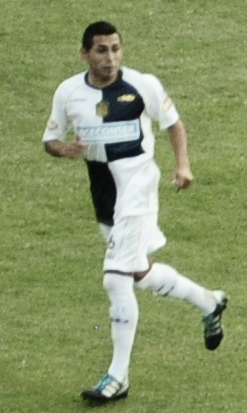
- Carrizo with Rosario Central in 2013

Personal information
- Full name: Federico Gastón Carrizo
- Date of birth: 17 May 1991 (age 35)
- Place of birth: Villa Giardino, Córdoba, Argentina
- Height: 1.70 m (5 ft 7 in)
- Position: Winger

Team information
- Current team: Cerro Porteño
- Number: 8

Youth career
- Rosario Central

Senior career*
Years	Team	Apps	(Gls)
2010–2014	Rosario Central	123	(13)
2014–2017	Boca Juniors	41	(3)
2015	→ Cruz Azul (loan)	4	(0)
2017–2019	Rosario Central	52	(4)
2019–	Cerro Porteño	209	(24)
2022	→ Peñarol (loan)	9	(0)
- * Club domestic league appearances and goals as of 12 August 2025

Federico Gastón Carrizo (born 17 May 1991, in Villa Giardino), commonly known as Pachi Carrizo, is an Argentine professional footballer who plays as a midfielder for Paraguayan Primera División club Cerro Porteño.

== Club career ==
In 2014, Carrizo signed with Argentinian club Boca Juniors. On 10 March 2016, Carrizo scored a goal against Bolivar for the 2016 Copa Libertadores, the match ended 1-1.

On 9 February 2022, it was announced that Carrizo did not want to sign his new Cerro Porteño contract that obliged him to be vaccinated against COVID-19, something that went against the footballer's religion.

== Honours ==
Rosario Central

- Copa Argentina: 2017–18

Boca Juniors

- Copa Argentina: 2015
- Primera División de Argentina: 2015
- Primera División de Argentina: 2016-17
