= Julián Chicco =

Argentine footballer

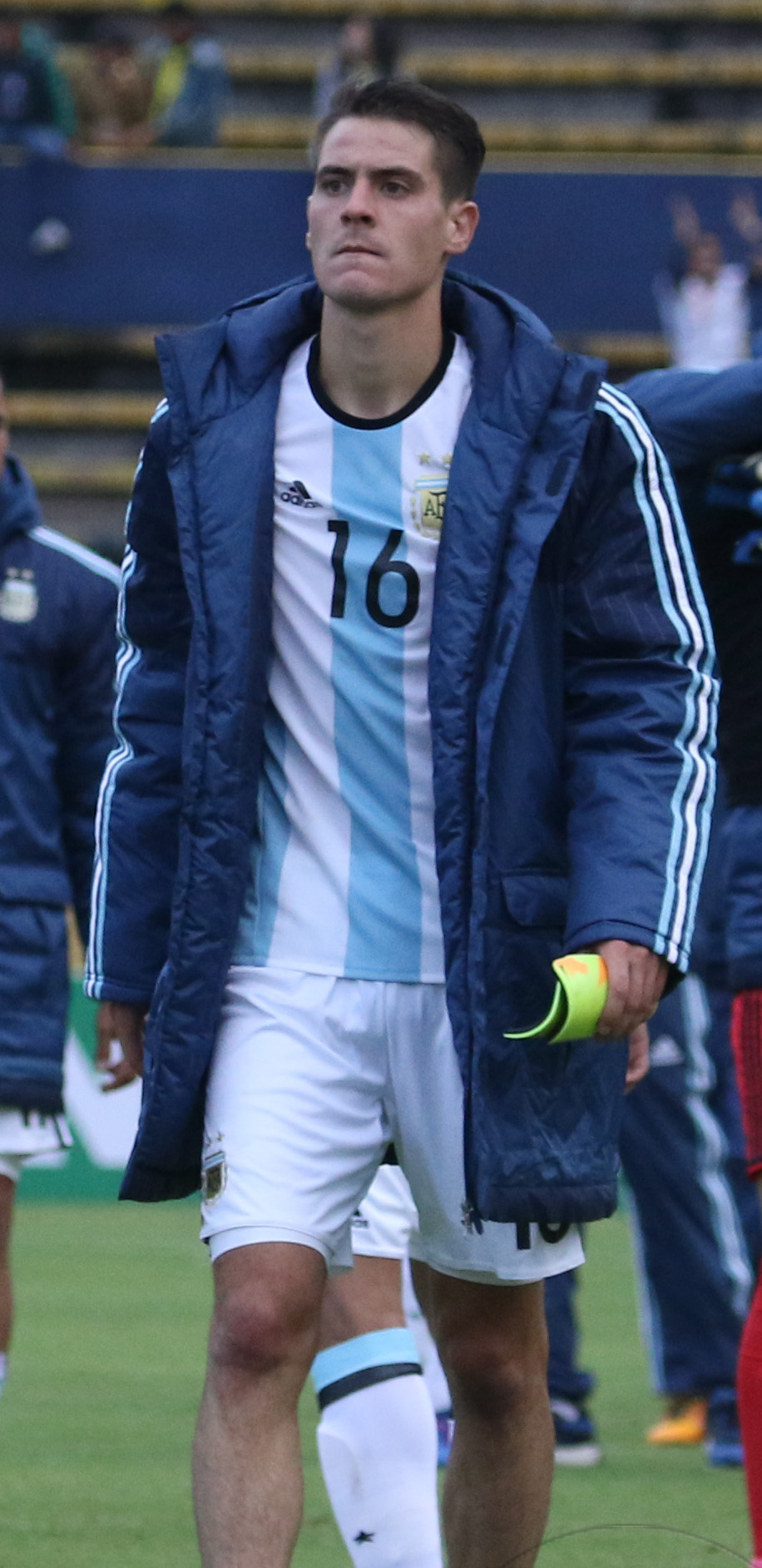
- Chicco with the Argentina U20 in 2017

Personal information
- Full name: Julián Antonio Chicco
- Date of birth: 13 January 1998 (age 28)
- Place of birth: Brinkmann, Argentina
- Height: 1.81 m (5 ft 11 in)
- Position: Midfielder

Team information
- Current team: Asteras Tripolis
- Number: 14

Youth career
- –2014: Boca Juniors
- 2014–2016: Boca Juniors

Senior career*
Years	Team	Apps	(Gls)
2016–2021	Boca Juniors	10	(0)
2019–2020	→ Patronato (loan)	15	(1)
2021–2022	Sarmiento	26	(0)
2022–2023	Colón	31	(0)
2023–2025	Leganés	46	(2)
2025–	Asteras Tripolis	11	(1)

International career
- Argentina U20
- * Club domestic league appearances and goals as of 21 February 2026

Julián Antonio Chicco (born 13 January 1998) is an Argentine professional footballer who plays as a midfielder for Super League Greece club Asteras Tripolis.

== Career ==
Chicco is a youth exponent from Boca Juniors. On 1 May 2016, he made his first team debut in a league game against Argentinos Juniors.

On 11 July 2023, after representing Patronato (on loan), Sarmiento and Colón in his home country, Chicco moved abroad and signed a two-year deal with Spanish Segunda División side CD Leganés.

== Honours ==
Leganés

- Segunda División: 2023–24
