= Ramiro Martínez (footballer) =

Argentine footballer

Personal information
- Full name: Ramiro Fernando Martínez
- Date of birth: 18 April 1991 (age 35)
- Place of birth: Mar del Plata, Argentina
- Height: 1.78 m (5 ft 10 in)
- Position: Goalkeeper

Team information
- Current team: Atlético Rafaela

Youth career
- Boca Juniors

Senior career*
Years	Team	Apps	(Gls)
2013–2017	Boca Juniors	0	(0)
2013–2015	→ Estudiantes (loan)	44	(0)
2017–2018	Godoy Cruz	0	(0)
2019–2026	Almirante Brown	205	(0)
2026–	Atlético Rafaela	0	(0)
- * Club domestic league appearances and goals as of 18:04, 27 March 2026 (UTC)

Ramiro Fernando Martínez (born 18 April 1991) is an Argentine professional footballer who plays as a goalkeeper for Atlético Rafaela.

== Career ==
Martínez began with Boca Juniors of the Argentine Primera División. In July 2013, Martínez joined Primera B Metropolitana side Estudiantes on loan until December 2015. He made his Estudiantes debut on 7 February 2015 in a Copa Argentina win against Almagro. A week later he made his pro league debut versus Villa San Carlos in a 0–0 draw. He went on to make forty-four Primera B Metropolitana appearances before returning to Boca Juniors. Two years later, Martínez left Boca permanently without featuring for the first-team and subsequently made the move to Godoy Cruz. He joined on a free transfer and signed a two-year contract.

He was released by Godoy Cruz at the conclusion of the 2017–18 Argentine Primera División campaign. In January 2019, Almirante Brown of Primera B Metropolitana signed Martínez.

== Personal life ==
Andrés Montenegro, a former professional footballer, is Martínez's cousin.

== Career statistics ==
As of 19 April 2019.

Club statistics
Club	Season	League			Cup		League Cup		Continental		Other		Total	
Club	Season	Division	Apps	Goals	Apps	Goals	Apps	Goals	Apps	Goals	Apps	Goals	Apps	Goals
Boca Juniors	2013–14	Primera División	0	0	0	0	—		0	0	0	0	0	0
Boca Juniors	2014	Primera División	0	0	0	0	—		0	0	0	0	0	0
Boca Juniors	2015	Primera División	0	0	0	0	—		0	0	0	0	0	0
Boca Juniors	2016	Primera División	0	0	0	0	—		0	0	0	0	0	0
Boca Juniors	2016–17	Primera División	0	0	0	0	—		0	0	0	0	0	0
Boca Juniors	Total		0	0	0	0	—		0	0	0	0	0	0
Estudiantes (loan)	2013–14	Primera B Metropolitana	0	0	0	0	—		—		0	0	0	0
Estudiantes (loan)	2014	Primera B Metropolitana	0	0	0	0	—		—		0	0	0	0
Estudiantes (loan)	2015	Primera B Metropolitana	44	0	2	0	—		—		0	0	46	0
Estudiantes (loan)	Total		44	0	2	0	—		—		0	0	46	0
Godoy Cruz	2017–18	Primera División	0	0	0	0	—		—		0	0	0	0
Almirante Brown	2018–19	Primera B Metropolitana	14	0	0	0	—		—		0	0	14	0
Career total			58	0	2	0	—		0	0	0	0	60	0
