= 2014 Club Atlético Boca Juniors season =

Boca Juniors
2014 season
- President: Daniel Angelici
- Manager: (Argentina) Carlos Bianchi (until August 28) (Argentina) Rodolfo Arruabarrena (from August 29)
- Stadium: Estadio Alberto J. Armando (La Bombonera)
- Torneo Transición: 5th
- Copa Argentina: Round of 16
- Copa Sudamericana: Semifinals
- Top goalscorer: League: Jonathan Calleri (6); All: Jonathan Calleri (8)
Home colours	Away colours

The 2014 Club Atlético Boca Juniors season was the 85th consecutive Primera División season played by the senior squad. That Boca Juniors took part in Argentine Primera División, Copa Argentina and Copa Sudamericana.

== Season overview ==
=== June ===
- 6 June: ▲ Boca announced that Jonathan Calleri signs for Boca from All Boys for $300.0000.
- 19 June: ▼ Lucas Viatri signs for Shanghai Greenland from Boca for €2.200.000.
- 20 June: ▲ Boca announced that Emanuel Trípodi renewed a one-year loan.
- 24 June: ▼ Juan Sánchez Miño signs for Torino from Boca for €3.200.000.

=== July ===
- 1 July: ▲ Lisandro Magallán, Guillermo Burdisso, Sebastián Palacios and Sergio Araujo returned from Rosario Central, Galatasaray, Unión and Tigre after a loan spell.

▼ Diego Perotti and Claudio Riaño expired their loans and signed with Genoa and Independiente respectively.

- 2 July: ▲ César Meli signs for Boca from Colón on a 6-month loan, with an option to make the move permanent for $500.0000.

▼ Alan Aguirre and Sebastián Vidal signed for Douglas Haig and Temperley, on a 6-month and 18-month loan respectively.

- 3 July: ▲ Gonzalo Castellani signs for Boca from Godoy Cruz for $1.600.000.

▼ Alan Pérez signed for Deportes Magallanes on a one-year loan.

- 4 July: ▼ Guillermo Fernández and Franco Fragapane signed for Atlético de Rafaela and Elche Ilicitano on an 18-month and one-year loan respectively.
- 8 July: ▲▼ Cristian Pavón signs for Boca from Talleres (C) for $1.600.000 and signs a one-year loan for Colón.
- 10 July: ▲ Federico Carrizo signs for Boca from Rosario Central for $2.700.000.
- 16 July: Boca played the first friendly match against Boca Unidos, the match ended in a 2-0 defeat for the team of Carlos Bianchi.
- 17 July: ▼ Juan Roman Riquelme signs for Argentinos Juniors from Boca after expiring the contract on 30 June.

▼ David Achucarro and Orlando Gaona Lugo signed for Olimpo on an 18-month loan .

- 19 July: ▼ Sergio Araujo signs for Las Palmas on a one-year loan.
- 20 July: Boca played the second friendly match against Nacional in Montevideo. The match ended 0–1 with the only goal coming from Jonathan Calleri in the 92nd minute that gave Boca the "Atilio Garcia Cup".
- 22 July: ▲ Andrés Chávez signs for Boca from Banfield for $2.500.000.
- 24 July: ▼ Diego Rivero signs for Argentinos Juniors from Boca after expiring the contract on 30 June.
- 26 July: ▼ Sebastián Palacios signs for Arsenal on a 6-month loan.

Boca played against Huracán on the Round of 32 of 2013–14 Copa Argentina and it was defeated 0-2. Emanuel Insúa was injured in the first half.

- 28 July: The new uniforms were presented.
- 30 July: ▲ José Pedro Fuenzalida signs for Boca from Colo-Colo for $400.000.

Due to the death of Julio Humberto Grondona the Round 1 of Torneo Transición was postponed 1 week.

- 31 July: ▼ Mauro Dalla Costa signs for San Martín (SJ) on a 6-month loan.

=== August ===
- 7 August: ▲ Mariano Echeverria signs for Boca from Arsenal on a one-year loan.
- 8 August: ▲▼ Alex Jara signs for Boca and signs a one-year loan for Sportivo Italiano.
- 10 August: On the Round 1 of Torneo Transición Boca started the tournament with a defeat against Newell's Old Boys. The only goal was scored by Mauricio Tévez.
- 15 August: Guillermo Burdisso suffered the rupturing of the meniscus. Burdisso would be out for several weeks.
- 18 August: On the Round 2 of Torneo Transición Boca defeated Belgrano, Emanuel Gigliotti scored the goal in the last seconds of the game with a great assist of Federico Carrizo. Fernando Gago was injured in the first half and was replaced by Gonzalo Castellani.
- 19 August: Fernando Gago and Juan Manuel Martínez suffered the distension of a muscle. They are not going to play against Atletico de Rafaela.
- 22 August: Another injured; Juan Forlín suffered the strain of the left Biceps femoris muscle. He also will not play against Atletico de Rafaela.
- 24 August: On the Round 3 of Torneo Transición Boca suffered another defeat in La Bombonera, against Atletico de Rafaela, who had never won in the stadium of Boca. The result was 0-3, and a great concern for Carlos Bianchi.
- 27 August: On the Round 4 of Torneo Transición, Boca worsened their crisis; it was defeated 3-1 by Estudiantes (LP), showing a very poor level.
- 27 August: ▼ Due to poor results, Carlos Bianchi was sacked after a year and a half in the club, in this time, he earned 26 wins, 22 ties and 26 defeats.
- 27 August: ▲ Rodolfo Arruabarrena was announced as the new manager.
- 31 August: On the Round 5 of Torneo Transición, after two consecutive defeats, Boca returned to the victory; defeated Vélez Sarsfield 3-1 on the first match of the new manager Rodolfo Arruabarrena.

=== September ===
- 4 September: On the first leg of the second stage of 2014 Copa Sudamericana, Boca played against Rosario Central, Boca was winning 1-0 but in the last seconds, Central was able to score and the match finished 1-1. Boca continued showing a great improvement.
- 5 September: Pablo Ledesma entered in the last minutes of the match against Rosario Central, but was injured, he suffered a luxation in his shoulder, he will be out 2 months.
- 7 September: On the Round 6 of Torneo Transición, Boca played with Olimpo in the stadium Roberto Carminatti, Olimpo played with 10 players almost the entire match, after searching the 1-0, Emanuel Gigliotti scored and Boca won their second straight game.
- 14 September: On the Round 7 of Torneo Transición, Boca played in La Bombonera against Racing. Jonathan Calleri scored the first goal but due to adverse weather conditions, it was rescheduled to September 25.
- 18 September: On the second leg of the second stage of 2014 Copa Sudamericana, Boca got a 3-0 victory over Rosario Central with Andrés Chávez scoring twice and José Pedro Fuenzalida scoring the third goal. Boca showed a very good football, and advanced to the next stage.
- 21 September: On the Round 8 of Torneo Transición, Boca played vs Banfield. Again, Andrés Chávez scored the first goal, but in the last moments of the game, Banfield scored and the match finished 1-1. Daniel Díaz was replaced in the half-time with a sprained left knee, he will be injured one month and he could not play the Superclásico.
- 22 September: After the problem of Daniel Díaz, is added a ney injury: Juan Forlín, again suffered another strain, on the right Gastrocnemius muscle, he will also could not play the Superclásico.
- 25 September: On the Round 7 of Torneo Transición, in the rescheduled match from September 14, Boca had problems in defense and Racing won 2-1 with Gustavo Bou scoring twice.
- 28 September: On the Round 9 of Torneo Transición, Boca played vs Quilmes and won 1-0, the only goal was scored by Federico Carrizo. Thus, Boca arrives to the Superclásico with confidence.

=== October ===
- 5 October: On the Round 10 of Torneo Transición, Boca played against River Plate, the Superclásico, the most important match of Argentina. It was a 1-1 draw, with Lisandro Magallán scoring for Boca and Germán Pezzella scoring for River.
- 12 October: On the Round 11 of Torneo Transición, Boca played against Rosario Central. It was a victory 2-1, despite not having a very good performance.
- 15 October: On the first leg of the Round of 16 of 2014 Copa Sudamericana Boca suffered against Deportivo Capiatá, a small team from Paraguay, it was 0-1.
- 19 October: On the Round 12 of Torneo Transición, Boca played against Godoy Cruz. It was a victory 3-2, showing defensive mistakes, with Fernando Gago playing a great match.
- 23 October: On the second leg of the Round of 16 of 2014 Copa Sudamericana, Boca won 1-0 in Luque against Deportivo Capiatá and forced the penalty shoot-out and won 4-3. Now Boca will play against another Paraguayan team: Cerro Porteño.
- 26 October: On the Round 13 of Torneo Transición, Boca played against Defensa y Justicia. It was a victory 2-0 with Juan Manuel Martínez scoring the two goals. Lisandro Magallán was injured in his left knee.
- 27 October: Finally, Lisandro Magallán suffered the anterior cruciate ligament of his left knee, and he will be out of activity for six months.
- 30 October: On the first leg of the Quarterfinals of 2014 Copa Sudamericana, Boca won 1-0 against Cerro Porteño in a tight match, with Emanuel Gigliotti scoring the only goal.

=== November ===
- 2 November: On the Round 14 of Torneo Transición, Boca played against San Lorenzo, again, under the rain, it was a 0-2 defeat. Boca couldn't play a good match.
- 6 November: On the second leg of the Quarterfinals of 2014 Copa Sudamericana, Boca won 4-1 against Cerro Porteño in a Paraguay, it was the best match of the team since the arrive of Rodolfo Arruabarrena. Now in Semifinals, Boca will play against River Plate another edition of the Superclásico, the last one in continental tournaments was 10 years ago in the Semifinals of the 2004 Copa Libertadores, with Boca winning the playoff by penalty shoot-out.
- 9 November: On the Round 15 of Torneo Transición, Boca played against Tigre, Boca playing with an alternative team won 2-0 with Emanuel Gigliotti scoring twice.
- 16 November: On the Round 16 of Torneo Transición, Boca played against Arsenal, again, with an alternative team and the game ended 1-1.
- 20 November: On the first leg of the Semifinals of 2014 Copa Sudamericana, Boca faced River Plate, it was 0-0 in a hard match and disputed match. River finished the game with 7 yellow cards. Juan Manuel Martínez played only 30 minutes because of a foul committed by Leonel Vangioni and it was replaced by José Pedro Fuenzalida.
- 21 November: Juan Manuel Martínez injury was confirmed: a sprain on his right ankle, He will not play in the rest of the season.
- 23 November: On the Round 17 of Torneo Transición, Boca played in La Bombonera against Independiente. It was a victory 3-1 with two goals of Jonathan Calleri and one of Emanuel Gigliotti. Federico Carrizo played a great match with two assists.
- 27 November: On the second leg of the Semifinals of 2014 Copa Sudamericana, Boca lost to River Plate 1-0 and was eliminated from the tournament.
- 30 November: On the Round 18 of Torneo Transición, Boca played against Lanús. It was a 2-2 draw, Boca played with an alternative team.

=== December ===
- 8 December: On the Round 19 of Torneo Transición, Boca played against Gimnasia y Esgrima (LP), in the last match of the season, it was a 0-2 defeat.

== Current squad ==
Last updated on 8 December 2014

Squad No.	Name	Nationality	Position	Date of Birth (Age)	Apps	Goals	Signed from	Note
Goalkeepers
1	Agustín Orion (VC 4º)	(Argentina)	GK	June 26, 1981 (age 45)	143	0	(Argentina) Estudiantes (LP)	
12	Emanuel Trípodi	(Argentina)	GK	January 8, 1981 (age 45)	7	0	(Argentina) Quilmes	
23	Sebastián D'Angelo	(Argentina)	GK	January 14, 1989 (age 37)	5	0	(Argentina) The Academy	
31	Manuel Vicentini	(Argentina)	GK	April 19, 1990 (age 36)	0	0	(Argentina) The Academy	
Defenders
2	Daniel Díaz (C)	(Argentina)	DF	July 13, 1979 (age 47)	138	11	(Spain) Atlético Madrid	
3	Emanuel Insúa	(Argentina)	DF	April 10, 1991 (age 35)	43	2	(Argentina) Godoy Cruz	
4	Hernán Grana	(Argentina)	DF	April 12, 1985 (age 41)	21	0	(Argentina) All Boys	
6	Juan Forlín	(Argentina)	DF	January 10, 1988 (age 38)	66	4	(Qatar) Al Rayyan	
13	Nahuel Zárate	(Argentina)	DF	January 27, 1993 (age 33)	33	0	(Argentina) The Academy	
14	Claudio Pérez	(Argentina)	DF	December 26, 1985 (age 40)	38	2	(Argentina) Belgrano	
15	Leandro Marín	(Argentina)	DF	January 22, 1992 (age 34)	48	2	(Argentina) The Academy	
22	Lisandro Magallán	(Argentina)	DF	September 27, 1993 (age 33)	22	1	(Argentina) Rosario Central	Injured
24	Guillermo Burdisso	(Argentina)	DF	September 26, 1988 (age 38)	42	3	(Turkey) Galatasaray	
28	Mariano Echeverria	(Argentina)	DF	May 27, 1981 (age 45)	16	2	(Argentina) Arsenal	
33	Juan Cruz Komar	(Argentina)	DF	August 13, 1996 (age 30)	1	0	(Argentina) The Academy	
Midfielders
5	Fernando Gago (VC 2º)	(Argentina)	MF	April 10, 1986 (age 40)	118	2	(Spain) Valencia	
8	Pablo Ledesma	(Argentina)	MF	February 4, 1984 (age 42)	236	17	(Italy) Catania	
10	Luciano Acosta	(Argentina)	MF	May 31, 1994 (age 32)	28	2	(Argentina) The Academy	
11	Federico Carrizo	(Argentina)	MF	May 17, 1991 (age 35)	25	1	(Argentina) Rosario Central	
16	Gonzalo Castellani	(Argentina)	MF	August 10, 1987 (age 39)	18	0	(Argentina) Godoy Cruz	
17	César Meli	(Argentina)	MF	June 20, 1992 (age 34)	18	1	(Argentina) Colón	
18	Nicolás Colazo	(Argentina)	MF	July 8, 1990 (age 36)	88	6	(Argentina) All Boys	
19	Federico Bravo	(Argentina)	MF	October 5, 1993 (age 33)	35	0	(Argentina) The Academy	
20	Adrián Cubas	(Argentina)	MF	May 22, 1996 (age 30)	12	0	(Argentina) The Academy	
21	Cristian Erbes (VC 3º)	(Argentina)	MF	January 6, 1990 (age 36)	126	4	(Argentina) The Academy	
26	José Pedro Fuenzalida	(Chile)	MF	February 22, 1985 (age 41)	18	1	(Chile) Colo-Colo	
29	Leonardo Suárez	(Argentina)	MF	March 30, 1996 (age 30)	2	0	(Argentina) The Academy	
30	Iván Colman	(Argentina)	MF	May 6, 1995 (age 31)	0	0	(Argentina) The Academy	
32	Franco Cristaldo	(Argentina)	MF	August 15, 1996 (age 30)	3	0	(Argentina) The Academy	
35	Matías Zaragoza	(Argentina)	MF	September 20, 1995 (age 31)	0	0	(Argentina) The Academy	
Forwards
7	Juan Manuel Martínez	(Argentina)	FW	October 25, 1985 (age 40)	66	8	(Brazil) Corinthians	Injured
9	Emanuel Gigliotti	(Argentina)	FW	May 20, 1987 (age 39)	59	23	(Italy) Novara	
25	Andrés Chávez	(Argentina)	FW	March 21, 1991 (age 35)	19	6	(Argentina) Banfield	
27	Jonathan Calleri	(Argentina)	FW	September 23, 1993 (age 33)	24	8	(Argentina) All Boys	
34	Joel Acosta	(Argentina)	FW	January 16, 1991 (age 35)	8	0	(Argentina) The Academy	

=== Transfers ===
In: Note: Flags indicate national team as defined under FIFA eligibility rules; some limited exceptions apply. Players may hold more than one non-FIFA nationality.

No.	Pos.	Nation	Player
—	DF	ARG	Mariano Echeverria (from Arsenal)
—	MF	ARG	Federico Carrizo (from Rosario Central)
—	MF	ARG	César Meli (from Colón)
—	MF	ARG	Gonzalo Castellani (from Godoy Cruz)
—	MF	CHI	José Pedro Fuenzalida (from (Chile) Colo-Colo)
—	FW	ARG	Andrés Chávez (from Banfield)
—	FW	ARG	Jonathan Calleri (from All Boys)

Out: Note: Flags indicate national team as defined under FIFA eligibility rules; some limited exceptions apply. Players may hold more than one non-FIFA nationality.

No.	Pos.	Nation	Player
—	MF	ARG	Juan Roman Riquelme (to Argentinos Juniors)
—	MF	ARG	Diego Rivero (to Argentinos Juniors)
—	MF	ARG	Juan Sánchez Miño (to (Italy) Torino)
—	MF	ARG	Diego Perotti (to (Italy) Genoa)
—	FW	ARG	Lucas Viatri (to (China) Shanghai Greenland)
—	FW	ARG	Claudio Riaño (to Independiente)
—	FW	ARG	Orlando Gaona Lugo (to Olimpo)

=== Out on loan ===
Note: Flags indicate national team as defined under FIFA eligibility rules; some limited exceptions apply. Players may hold more than one non-FIFA nationality.

No.	Pos.	Nation	Player
—	DF	ARG	David Achucarro (at Olimpo)
—	DF	ARG	Alan Aguirre (at Douglas Haig)
—	DF	ARG	Fernando Evangelista (at Atlético Tucumán)
—	DF	ARG	Alan Pérez (at (Chile) Deportes Magallanes)
—	MF	ARG	Cristian Álvarez (at (Chile) Deportes Antofagasta)
—	MF	ARG	Gonzalo Escalante (at (Italy) Calcio Catania)
—	MF	ARG	Guillermo Fernández (at Atlético de Rafaela)
—	MF	ARG	Esteban Orfano (at Patronato)
—	MF	ARG	Leandro Paredes (at (Italy) Roma)

No.	Pos.	Nation	Player
—	MF	ARG	Gastón Rossi (at Almirante Brown)
—	MF	ARG	Sebastián Vidal (at Temperley)
—	MF	ARG	Alex Jara (at Sportivo Italiano)
—	FW	ARG	Sergio Araujo (at (Spain) Las Palmas)
—	FW	ARG	Franco Fragapane (at (Spain) Elche Ilicitano)
—	FW	ARG	Juan Manuel Imbert (at Atlético Tucumán)
—	FW	ARG	Sebastián Palacios (at Arsenal)
—	FW	ARG	Mauro Dalla Costa (at San Martín (SJ))
—	FW	ARG	Cristian Pavón (at Colón)

Position	Staff
Manager	(Argentina) Rodolfo Arruabarrena
Assistant coach	Diego Markic; Mauro Navas
Fitness coach	Gustavo Roberti; Pablo Santella
Goalkeeping coach	Fernando Gayoso
Doctor	Pablo Ortega Gallo
Kinesiologist	Rubén Araguas

== Friendlies ==
Win Draw Loss Postponed

July 16, 2014 Pre-season	Boca Unidos	2–0	Boca Juniors	Corrientes, Argentina
	Vizcarra 5'; Dening 62'			Stadium: Estadio Jose Antonio Romero Feris; Referee: Fernando Rapallini

July 20, 2014 Pre-season – Atilio García Cup	Nacional (Uruguay)	0–1	(Argentina) Boca Juniors	Montevideo, Uruguay
16:00 UTC−3			Calleri 92'	Stadium: Estadio Centenario; Referee: Daniel Fedorczuk

August 2, 2014 Pre-season-First Team	Boca Juniors	1–0	Quilmes	Buenos Aires, Argentina
10:00 UTC−3	Martínez	Report		Stadium: La Bombonera; Attendance: No attendance

August 2, 2014 Pre-season-Reserve Team	Boca Juniors	0–2	Quilmes	Buenos Aires, Argentina
10:00 UTC−3		Report	Ciampichetti; Zacaría	Stadium: Complejo Pedro Pompilio; Attendance: No attendance

== Competitions ==
=== Overall ===
Competition	Started round	Final position/round	First match	Last match
Torneo Transición	–	5th	10 August 2014	7 December 2014
Copa Argentina	Round of 16		26 July 2014	
Copa Sudamericana	Second stage	Semifinals	4 September 2014	27 November 2014

=== Overview ===
Updated as of 8 December 2014.

Competition	Record							
Competition	G	W	D	L	GF	GA	GD	Win %
Torneo Transición	19	9	4	6	25	23	+2	47.37
Copa Argentina	1	0	0	1	0	2	−2	0.00
Copa Sudamericana	8	4	2	2	10	4	+6	50.00
Total	28	13	6	9	35	29	+6	46.43

=== Primera División ===
==== League table ====
Pos	Team	Pld	W	D	L	GF	GA	GD	Pts	Qualification
3	Lanús	19	10	5	4	28	23	+5	35	2015 Copa Sudamericana second stage
4	Independiente	19	10	3	6	31	29	+2	33	2015 Copa Sudamericana second stage
5	Boca Juniors	19	9	4	6	25	23	+2	31	2015 Copa Libertadores second stage
6	Estudiantes (LP)	19	9	4	6	23	23	0	31	2015 Copa Libertadores first stage (Note: Qualified as 2014 Copa Sudamericana best Argentine team not yet qualified.)
7	Tigre	19	8	2	9	30	26	+4	26	2015 Copa Sudamericana second stage

Source: Programación de Primera División Torneo Final 2013/2014

==== Results summary ====
Overall								Home						Away					
Pld	W	D	L	GF	GA	GD	Pts	W	D	L	GF	GA	GD	W	D	L	GF	GA	GD
19	9	4	6	25	23	+2	31	6	0	4	14	11	+3	3	4	2	11	12	−1

Last updated: October 12, 2014.
Source: AFA

==== Results by round ====
Round	1	2	3	4	5	6	7	8	9	10	11	12	13	14	15	16	17	18	19
Ground	H	A	H	A	H	A	H	A	H	A	H	A	H	A	H	A	H	A	H
Result	L	W	L	L	W	W	L	D	W	D	W	W	W	L	W	D	W	D	L
Position	14	12	16	18	14	10	11	11	11	9	8	5	5	5	5	5	5	5	5

Source: AFA
A = Away; H = Home; W = Win; D = Draw; L = Loss

==== Matches ====
Win Draw Loss Postponed

August 10, 2014 1	Boca Juniors	0-1	Newell's Old Boys	Buenos Aires
18:30 UTC−3		Report	Tévez (yellow card) 27' (goal) 45+3'; Díaz (yellow card) 72'; Scocco (yellow card) 80'; Mateo (yellow card) 80'	Stadium: La Bombonera; Referee: Federico Beligoy

August 17, 2014 2	Belgrano	0-1	Boca Juniors	Córdoba
21:30 UTC−3	Olave (yellow card) 56'; Farré (yellow card) 67'; Velázquez (yellow card) 71'; Barrios (yellow card) 73'	Report	Bravo (yellow card) 17'; Zárate (yellow card) 38'; Gigliotti (yellow card) 59' (goal) 90+3'	Stadium: Mario Alberto Kempes; Referee: Diego Ceballos

August 24, 2014 3	Boca Juniors	0-3	Atlético de Rafaela	Buenos Aires
18:15 UTC−3	Carrizo (yellow card) 46'; Chávez (yellow card) 67'	Report	Niz (yellow card) 13'; Gómez 36'; Depetris (yellow card) 13'; Gónzalez 54'; Serrano (yellow card) 65'; Fernández 73'	Stadium: La Bombonera; Referee: Carlos Maglio

August 27, 2014 4	Estudiantes (LP)	3-1	Boca Juniors	La Plata
21:30 UTC−3	Correa 4'; Vera 21' 39'; Gil Romero (yellow card) 45+1'	Report	Chávez (yellow card) 45+1'; Zárate (yellow card) 89'; Calleri 89'	Stadium: Ciudad de La Plata; Referee: Silvio Trucco

August 31, 2014 5	Boca Juniors	3-1	Vélez Sarsfield	Buenos Aires
18:15 UTC−3	Calleri (yellow card) 52'; Díaz 55' (yellow card) 68'; Meli 61'; Castellani (red card) 83'; Chávez 88'	Report	Domínguez (yellow card) 20'; Correa 44'; Cubero (yellow card) 60'	Stadium: La Bombonera; Referee: Patricio Losteau

September 7, 2014 6	Olimpo	0-1	Boca Juniors	Bahía Blanca
21:30 UTC−3	Borja (red card) 13'; Vega (yellow card) 36'; Villanueva (yellow card) 67'; Sills (yellow card) 83' (yellow-red card) 87'; Furios (yellow card) 88'	Report	Echeverria (yellow card) 70'; Gigliotti 77'	Stadium: Roberto Carminatti; Referee: Diego Ceballos

September 21, 2014 8	Banfield	1-1	Boca Juniors	Banfield
18:15 UTC−3	Noguera (yellow card) 54'; Terzaghi 89'; Bianchi Arce (yellow card) 90+1'	Report	Insúa (yellow card) 34'; Erbes (yellow card) 44'; Chávez 65'; Marín (yellow card) 69'	Stadium: Florencio Solá; Referee: Saul Laverni

September 25, 2014 7	Boca Juniors	1-2	Racing	Buenos Aires
18:00 UTC−3	Calleri 25'; Erbes (yellow card) 34'; Colazo (yellow card) 82'; Meli (yellow card) 90+1'	Report	Díaz (yellow card) 21'; Bou 62', 71'	Stadium: La Bombonera; Referee: Federico Beligoy
Note: Match suspended in the 56th minute due to adverse weather conditions, it was rescheduled from September 14.

September 28, 2014 9	Boca Juniors	1-0	Quilmes	Buenos Aires
18:15 UTC−3	Carrizo 51'; Erbes (yellow card) 67'; Meli (yellow card) 70'	Report	González (yellow card) 14'; Romero (yellow card) 34'; Carli (yellow card) 48'; Martínez (yellow card) 85'; Carrasco (yellow card) 88'	Stadium: La Bombonera; Referee: Fernando Rapallini

October 5, 2014 10	River Plate	1-1	Boca Juniors	Buenos Aires
17:15 UTC−3	Vangioni (yellow card) 25'; Mora (penalty missed) 43' (yellow card) 81'; Mercado (yellow card) 55'; Pezzella 77'; Funes Mori (red card) 83'	Report	Magallán 22'; Marín (yellow card) 27'; Gago (red card) 40'; Chávez (yellow card) 42'	Stadium: Monumental Antonio Vespucio Liberti; Referee: Mauro Vigliano

October 12, 2014 11	Boca Juniors	2-1	Rosario Central	Buenos Aires
18:15 UTC−3	Echeverria (yellow card) 3' (goal) 75'; Meli (yellow card) 55'; Erbes (yellow card) 69'; Marín 77'	Report	Montoya (yellow card) 20'; Valencia 44'; Domínguez (yellow card) 55'; Acevedo (red card) 61'; Gómez (yellow card) 77'; Gómez Andrade (yellow card) 86'	Stadium: La Bombonera; Referee: Darío Herrera

October 19, 2014 12	Godoy Cruz	2-3	Boca Juniors	Mendoza
21:30 UTC−3	García Guerreño (yellow card) 23' (goal) 43'; Ayoví 49'	Report	Insúa (yellow card) 2'; Gago 9'; Martínez 73'; Calleri 81' (yellow card) 81'; Forlín (yellow card) 84'	Stadium: Malvinas Argentinas; Referee: Saul Laverni

October 26, 2014 13	Boca Juniors	2-0	Defensa y Justicia	Buenos Aires
18:15 UTC−3	Martínez 8', 39'; Cubas (yellow card) 12'; Pérez (yellow card) 60'	Report	Matheu (yellow card) 34'; Casteglione (yellow card) 50'; Vella (yellow card) 83'; Leyes (yellow card) 89'	Stadium: La Bombonera; Referee: Néstor Pitana

November 2, 2014 14	San Lorenzo	2-0	Boca Juniors	Buenos Aires
16:00 UTC−3	Cauteruccio 51'; Verón 56'; Ortigoza (yellow card) 89'	Report	Erbes (yellow card) 11'; Ledesma (yellow card) 29'; Gigliotti (yellow card) 42'	Stadium: Pedro Bidegain; Referee: Andrés Merlos

November 9, 2014 15	Boca Juniors	2-0	Tigre	Buenos Aires
18:15 UTC−3	Pérez (yellow card) 52'; Fuenzalida (yellow card) 56'; Gigliotti (penalty missed) 70' 70', 82'; Meli (yellow card) 75'; Chávez (yellow card) 90+1'	Report	Acevedo (yellow card) 38'; Luna (yellow card) 52'; Cáceres (yellow card) 56'; Arzura (yellow card) 61'	Stadium: La Bombonera; Referee: Germán Delfino

November 16, 2014 16	Arsenal	1-1	Boca Juniors	Sarandí
21:30 UTC−3	Alemán 50' (yellow card) 59'	Report	Grana (yellow card) 22'; Insúa (yellow card) 36'; Echeverria (yellow card) 49' (goal) 53'	Stadium: Julio H. Grondona; Referee: Fernando Rapallini

November 23, 2014 17	Boca Juniors	3-1	Independiente	Buenos Aires
19:10 UTC−3	Calleri 5', 71'; Cubas (yellow card) 42'; Grana (yellow card) 51'; Gigliotti 88'; Insúa (yellow card) 90+2'	Report	Bellocq (yellow card) 9' (yellow-red card) 56'; Zárate (yellow card) 11'; Pisano 54'	Stadium: La Bombonera; Referee: Darío Herrera

November 30, 2014 18	Lanús	2-2	Boca Juniors	Lanús
21:30 UTC−3	Acosta 0', 43'; Ortiz (yellow card) 45+1'; Araujo (yellow card) 90+4'	Report	Castellani (yellow card) 25'; Pérez (yellow card) 43'; Calleri (yellow card) 47' (goal) 87'; Carrizo (yellow card) 54'; Insúa 75' (red card) 85'; Marín (yellow card) 83'	Stadium: Ciudad de Lanús; Referee: Jorge Baliño

December 7, 2014 19	Boca Juniors	0-2	Gimnasia y Esgrima (LP)	Buenos Aires
20:40 UTC−3	Calleri (yellow card) 47'	Report	Rojas 10'; Vegetti 46'; Licht (yellow card) 79'	Stadium: La Bombonera; Referee: Diego Abal

=== Copa Argentina ===
==== Round of 32 ====
July 26, 2014	Boca Juniors	0–2	Huracán	San Juan
20:15 UTC−3	Díaz (yellow card) 32'; Grana (yellow card) 36' (red card) 90+1'; Gago (yellow card) 65'; Erbes (yellow card) 73'	Report	Villarruel (yellow card) 14'; Vismara (yellow card) 14'; Ábila 59'; Mancinelli 66'; Arano (yellow card) 90+3'	Stadium: Estadio del Bicentenario; Referee: Darío Herrera

=== Copa Sudamericana ===
==== Second stage ====
September 4, 2014 First leg	Rosario Central (Argentina)	1–1	(Argentina) Boca Juniors	Rosario, Argentina
21:15 UTC−3	Delgado (yellow card) 82'; Donatti (red card) 90+1'; Becker 90+6'	Report	Echeverría (yellow card) 13'; Marín 36'; Erbes (yellow card) 42'; Acosta (yellow card) 51'; Orion (yellow card) 86'	Stadium: Estadio Gigante de Arroyito; Referee: (Argentina) Mauro Vigliano

September 18, 2014 Second leg	Boca Juniors (Argentina)	3–0 (4–1 agg.)	(Argentina) Rosario Central	Buenos Aires, Argentina
21:15 UTC−3	Chávez 20', 70'; Fuenzalida 83'	Report	Caranta (yellow card) 18'; Acevedo (yellow card) 25' (yellow-red card) 35'; Barrientos (yellow card) 88'	Stadium: La Bombonera; Referee: (Argentina) Diego Abal

==== Final Stages ====
===== Round of 16 =====
October 15, 2014 First leg	Boca Juniors (Argentina)	0–1	(Paraguay) Deportivo Capiatá	Buenos Aires, Argentina
21:15 UTC−3	Meli (yellow card) 39'	Report	Ortíz (yellow card) 38'; Ruiz 43'; López (yellow card) 51'; Aquino (yellow card) 60'; Ruíz Peralta (yellow card) 72'	Stadium: La Bombonera; Referee: (Brazil) Sandro Ricci

October 23, 2014 Second leg	Deportivo Capiatá (Paraguay)	0–1 (1–1 agg.) (3–4 p)	(Argentina) Boca Juniors	Luque, Paraguay
21:15 UTC−3	Ruíz Peralta (yellow card) 33'; Velázquez (yellow card) 44' (yellow-red card) 64'; Irala (yellow card) 44'; Pereira (yellow card) 58'; Aquino (yellow card) 76'; Escobar (yellow card) 88'	Report	Forlín (yellow card) 44'; Meli (yellow card) 61'; Fuenzalida (yellow card) 69'; Calleri 73'; Magallán (yellow card) 86'	Stadium: Estadio Feliciano Cáceres; Referee: (Colombia) Wilmar Roldán
	Penalties
	Escobar (penalty scored); González (penalty scored); Irala (penalty missed); Irrazábal (penalty missed); Martínez (penalty scored); Aquino (penalty missed)		(penalty scored) Gigliotti; (penalty missed) Pérez; (penalty scored) Gago; (penalty missed) Colazo; (penalty scored) Chávez; (penalty scored) Orion

===== Quarterfinals =====
October 30, 2014 First leg	Boca Juniors (Argentina)	1–0	(Paraguay) Cerro Porteño	Buenos Aires, Argentina
21:30 UTC−3	Marín (yellow card) 48'; Calleri (yellow card) 54'; Martínez (yellow card) 57'; Gigliotti 82'	Report	Benítez (yellow card) 25'; Oviedo (yellow card) 45'; Mareco (yellow card) 88'	Stadium: La Bombonera; Referee: (Peru) Victor Hugo Carrillo

November 6, 2014 Second leg	Cerro Porteño (Paraguay)	1–4 (1-5 agg.)	(Argentina) Boca Juniors	Asunción, Paraguay
19:00 UTC−3	Güiza 27'; Oviedo (yellow card) 52'; Mareco (yellow card) 56'	Report	Calleri 9'; Orion (yellow card) 30'; Fuenzalida (yellow card) 46'; Pérez (yellow card) 64'; Chávez 66', 85'; Gigliotti 73'; Meli (yellow card) 85'	Stadium: Estadio Defensores del Chaco; Referee: (Uruguay) Martín Vázquez

===== Semifinals =====
November 20, 2014 First leg	Boca Juniors (Argentina)	0–0	(Argentina) River Plate	Buenos Aires, Argentina
20:45 UTC−3	Díaz (yellow card) 20'; Gago (yellow card) 59'	Report	Vangioni (yellow card) 5'; Ponzio (yellow card) 41'; Funes Mori (yellow card) 47'; Sánchez (yellow card) 57'; Gutiérrez (yellow card) 58'; Maidana (yellow card) 71'; Mercado (yellow card) 90+1'	Stadium: La Bombonera; Referee: (Argentina) Silvio Trucco

November 27, 2014 Second leg	River Plate (Argentina)	1-0 (1-0 agg.)	(Argentina) Boca Juniors	Buenos Aires, Argentina
20:45 UTC−3	Mercado (yellow card) 1'; Ponzio (yellow card) 1'; Pisculichi 16'; Vangioni (yellow card) 29'; Rojas (yellow card) 57'	Report	Gigliotti (penalty missed) 3'; Forlín (yellow card) 34'; Fuenzalida (yellow card) 44'; Díaz (yellow card) 58' (red card) 90+4'; Carrizo (yellow card) 61'; Chávez (yellow card) 90+3'	Stadium: Monumental Antonio Vespucio Liberti; Referee: (Argentina) Germán Delfino

== Team statistics ==
	Total	Home	Away	Neutral
Games played	28	14	13	1
Games won	13	7	5	0
Games drawn	5	1	5	0
Games lost	9	5	3	1
Biggest win	3-0 vs Rosario Central; 4-1 vs Cerro Porteño	3-0 vs Rosario Central	1-0 vs Belgrano; 1-0 vs Olimpo	None
Biggest loss	0-3 vs Atlético de Rafaela	0-3 vs Atlético de Rafaela	1-3 vs Estudiantes (LP)	0-2 vs Huracán
Biggest win (Torneo Transicion)	3-1 vs Vélez Sarsfield; 2-0 vs Defensa y Justicia; 2-0 vs Tigre; 3-1 vs Independiente	3-1 vs Vélez Sarsfield; 2-0 vs Defensa y Justicia; 2-0 vs Tigre	1-0 vs Belgrano; 1-0 vs Olimpo	None
Biggest win (Copa Argentina)	None			
Biggest win (Copa Sudamericana)	3-0 vs Rosario Central; 4-1 vs Cerro Porteño	3-0 vs Rosario Central	4-1 vs Cerro Porteño	None
Biggest loss (Torneo Transicion)	0-3 vs Atlético de Rafaela	0-3 vs Atlético de Rafaela	1-3 vs Estudiantes (LP)	None
Biggest loss (Copa Argentina)	0-2 vs Huracán	None		0-2 vs Huracán
Biggest loss (Copa Sudamericana)	0-1 vs Deportivo Capiatá; 0-1 vs River Plate	0-1 vs Deportivo Capiatá	0-1 vs River Plate	None
Clean sheets	9	6	3	0
Goals scored	35	18	17	0
Goals conceded	29	12	15	2
Goal difference	+6	+6	+2	-2
Yellow cards	74	28	42	4
Red cards	5	1	3	1
Most appearances	Agustín Orion (28)			
Top scorer	Calleri (8)	Gigliotti (4)	Calleri (4)	None
Worst discipline	Grana; Castellani; Gago; Díaz; Insúa (1RC)	Castellani (1RC)	Gago; Díaz; Insúa (1RC)	Grana (1RC)
Penalties for	2	1	1	
Penalties against	1		1	

=== Season Appearances and goals ===
Last updated on 8 December 2014.

No.	Pos	Nat	Player	Total		Torneo Transición		Copa Argentina		Copa Sudamericana	
No.	Pos	Nat	Player	Apps	Goals	Apps	Goals	Apps	Goals	Apps	Goals
Goalkeepers
1	GK	(Argentina) ARG	Agustín Orion	27	-28	18	-22	1	-2	8	-4
12	GK	(Argentina) ARG	Emanuel Trípodi	2	-1	1	-1	0+1	0	0	0
23	GK	(Argentina) ARG	Sebastián D'Angelo	0	0	0	0	0	0	0	0
31	GK	(Argentina) ARG	Manuel Vicentini	0	0	0	0	0	0	0	0
Defenders
2	DF	(Argentina) ARG	Daniel Díaz	14	1	9	1	1	0	4	0
3	DF	(Argentina) ARG	Emanuel Insúa	16	1	9+3	1	1	0	0+3	0
4	DF	(Argentina) ARG	Hernán Grana	6	0	5	0	1	0	0	0
6	DF	(Argentina) ARG	Juan Forlín	11	0	4+1	0	1	0	5	0
13	DF	(Argentina) ARG	Nahuel Zárate	4	0	4	0	0	0	0	0
14	DF	(Argentina) ARG	Claudio Pérez	8	0	3+2	0	0	0	3	0
15	DF	(Argentina) ARG	Leandro Marín	21	2	13	1	0+1	0	7	1
22	DF	(Argentina) ARG	Lisandro Magallán	11	1	8+1	1	0	0	2	0
24	DF	(Argentina) ARG	Guillermo Burdisso	1	0	0+1	0	0	0	0	0
28	DF	(Argentina) ARG	Mariano Echeverria	16	2	13	2	0	0	3	0
33	DF	(Argentina) ARG	Juan Cruz Komar	1	0	1	0	0	0	0	0
Midfielders
5	MF	(Argentina) ARG	Fernando Gago	17	1	10	1	1	0	6	0
8	MF	(Argentina) ARG	Pablo Ledesma	3	0	1+1	0	0	0	0+1	0
10	MF	(Argentina) ARG	Luciano Acosta	15	0	5+7	0	0	0	1+2	0
11	MF	(Argentina) ARG	Federico Carrizo	25	1	19	1	1	0	3+2	0
16	MF	(Argentina) ARG	Gonzalo Castellani	18	0	8+6	0	1	0	2+1	0
17	MF	(Argentina) ARG	César Meli	18	1	8+2	1	0	0	8	0
18	MF	(Argentina) ARG	Nicolás Colazo	17	0	8+1	0	0	0	8	0
19	MF	(Argentina) ARG	Federico Bravo	8	0	5+3	0	0	0	0	0
20	MF	(Argentina) ARG	Adrián Cubas	9	0	7	0	0	0	1+1	0
21	MF	(Argentina) ARG	Cristian Erbes	18	0	11	0	1	0	6	0
26	MF	(Chile) CHI	José Pedro Fuenzalida	18	1	7+5	0	0	0	3+3	1
29	MF	(Argentina) ARG	Leonardo Suárez	2	0	0+2	0	0	0	0	0
32	MF	(Argentina) ARG	Iván Colman	0	0	0	0	0	0	0	0
32	MF	(Argentina) ARG	Franco Cristaldo	3	0	1+2	0	0	0	0	0
35	MF	(Argentina) ARG	Matías Zaragoza	0	0	0	0	0	0	0	0
Forwards
7	FW	(Argentina) ARG	Juan Manuel Martínez	15	3	5+4	3	0+1	0	2+3	0
9	FW	(Argentina) ARG	Emanuel Gigliotti	23	7	13+3	5	1	0	1+5	2
25	FW	(Argentina) ARG	Andrés Chávez	19	6	6+5	2	0	0	7+1	4
27	FW	(Argentina) ARG	Jonathan Calleri	24	8	10+5	6	1	0	8	2
34	FW	(Argentina) ARG	Joel Acosta	1	0	0+1	0	0	0	0	0

=== Top scorers ===
Last updated on 8 December 2014.

Rank	Pos.	No.	Name	Torneo Transición	Copa Argentina	Copa Sudamericana	Total
1	FW	27	(Argentina) Jonathan Calleri	6	0	2	8
2	FW	9	(Argentina) Emanuel Gigliotti	5	0	2	7
3	FW	25	(Argentina) Andrés Chávez	2	0	4	6
4	FW	7	(Argentina) Juan Manuel Martínez	3	0	0	3
5	DF	15	(Argentina) Leandro Marín	1	0	1	2
5	DF	28	(Argentina) Mariano Echeverria	2	0	0	2
7	DF	2	(Argentina) Daniel Díaz	1	0	0	1
7	MF	17	(Argentina) César Meli	1	0	0	1
7	MF	26	(Chile) José Pedro Fuenzalida	0	0	1	1
7	MF	11	(Argentina) Federico Carrizo	1	0	0	1
7	DF	22	(Argentina) Lisandro Magallán	1	0	0	1
7	MF	5	(Argentina) Fernando Gago	1	0	0	1
7	DF	3	(Argentina) Emanuel Insúa	1	0	0	1
	-	-	Own goals				
Total				25	0	10	35

=== Top assists ===
Last updated on 8 December 2014.

Rank	Pos.	No.	Name	Torneo Transición	Copa Argentina	Copa Sudamericana	Total
1	MF	11	(Argentina) Federico Carrizo	6	0	0	6
2	FW	25	(Argentina) Andrés Chávez	2	0	3	5
3	MF	5	(Argentina) Fernando Gago	1	0	3	4
4	FW	27	(Argentina) Jonathan Calleri	1	0	1	2
4	MF	10	(Argentina) Luciano Acosta	2	0	0	2
6	MF	18	(Argentina) Nicolás Colazo	1	0	0	1
6	FW	9	(Argentina) Emanuel Gigliotti	1	0	0	1
6	MF	26	(Chile) José Pedro Fuenzalida	0	0	1	1
Total				14	0	8	22

=== Penalties ===
Date	Penalty Taker	Scored	Opponent	Competition
9 November 2014	Emanuel Gigliotti	No	Tigre	Torneo Transición
28 November 2014	Emanuel Gigliotti	No	River Plate	Copa Sudamericana

=== Clean sheets ===
Last updated on 8 December 2014.

Rank	Pos.	No.	Name	Torneo Transición	Copa Argentina	Copa Sudamericana	Total
1	GK	1	(Argentina) Agustín Orion	5	0	4	9
Total				4	0	3	7

=== Disciplinary record ===
Last updated on 8 December 2014.

No.	Pos	Nat	Name	Torneo Transición			Copa Argentina			Copa Sudamericana			Total		
No.	Pos	Nat	Name	Booked	(yellow card) (yellow-red card)	Sent off (straight red)	Booked	(yellow card) (yellow-red card)	Sent off (straight red)	Booked	(yellow card) (yellow-red card)	Sent off (straight red)	Booked	(yellow card) (yellow-red card)	Sent off (straight red)
Goalkeepers
1	GK	(Argentina)	Agustín Orion							2			2		
12	GK	(Argentina)	Emanuel Trípodi												
23	GK	(Argentina)	Sebastián D'Angelo												
31	GK	(Argentina)	Manuel Vicentini												
Defenders
2	DF	(Argentina)	Daniel Díaz	1			1			2		1	3		1
3	DF	(Argentina)	Emanuel Insúa	4		1							4		1
4	DF	(Argentina)	Hernán Grana	2			1		1				3		1
6	DF	(Argentina)	Juan Forlín	1						2			3		
13	DF	(Argentina)	Nahuel Zárate	2									2		
14	DF	(Argentina)	Claudio Pérez	3						1			4		
15	DF	(Argentina)	Leandro Marín	3						1			4		
22	DF	(Argentina)	Lisandro Magallán							1			1		
24	DF	(Argentina)	Guillermo Burdisso												
28	DF	(Argentina)	Mariano Echeverria	3						1			4		
33	DF	(Argentina)	Juan Cruz Komar												
Midfielders
5	MF	(Argentina)	Fernando Gago			1	1			1			2		1
8	MF	(Argentina)	Pablo Ledesma	1									1		
10	MF	(Argentina)	Luciano Acosta							1			1		
11	MF	(Argentina)	Federico Carrizo	2						1			3		
16	MF	(Argentina)	Gonzalo Castellani	1		1							1		1
17	MF	(Argentina)	César Meli	4						3			7		
18	MF	(Argentina)	Nicolás Colazo	1									1		
19	MF	(Argentina)	Federico Bravo	1									1		
20	MF	(Argentina)	Adrián Cubas	2									2		
21	MF	(Argentina)	Cristian Erbes	5			1			1			7		
26	MF	(Chile)	José Pedro Fuenzalida	1						3			4		
29	MF	(Argentina)	Leonardo Suárez												
30	MF	(Argentina)	Iván Colman												
32	MF	(Argentina)	Franco Cristaldo												
35	MF	(Argentina)	Matías Zaragoza												
Forwards
7	FW	(Argentina)	Juan Manuel Martínez							1			1		
9	FW	(Argentina)	Emanuel Gigliotti	2									2		
25	FW	(Argentina)	Andrés Chávez	4						1			5		
27	FW	(Argentina)	Jonathan Calleri	4						1			5		
34	FW	(Argentina)	Joel Acosta												
Total				47		2	4		1	23			74		5
