= Lisandro Magallán =

Argentine footballer (born 1993)

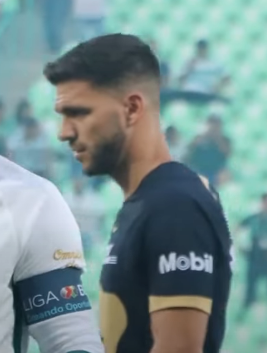
- Magallán with UNAM in 2023

Personal information
- Date of birth: 27 September 1993 (age 33)
- Place of birth: La Plata, Argentina
- Height: 1.85 m (6 ft 1 in)
- Position: Centre-back

Team information
- Current team: Vélez Sarsfield
- Number: 16

Senior career*
Years	Team	Apps	(Gls)
2010–2012	Gimnasia La Plata	26	(0)
2012–2019	Boca Juniors	57	(2)
2013–2014	→ Rosario Central (loan)	11	(0)
2016	→ Defensa y Justicia (loan)	16	(1)
2019–2023	Ajax	4	(0)
2019–2020	→ Alavés (loan)	17	(1)
2020–2021	→ Crotone (loan)	28	(1)
2021–2022	→ Anderlecht (loan)	24	(0)
2023	Elche	14	(0)
2023–2025	UNAM	60	(1)
2025–	Vélez Sarsfield	27	(1)

International career
- Argentina U20
2016	Argentina U23	1	(0)
- * Club domestic league appearances and goals as of 17:01, 16 June 2026 (UTC)

Lisandro Magallán (born 27 September 1993) is an Argentine professional footballer who plays as a centre-back for Vélez Sarsfield.

He also played for the Argentina football team at the 2016 Summer Olympics.

== Club career ==
=== La Plata and Boca Juniors ===
Born in La Plata, Magallán made his senior debut for Gimnasia La Plata on 10 August 2010. In April 2012, he was reported to have been scouted by English club Manchester City. On 26 July 2012 Boca Juniors paid $1.4 million for 80% of the rights to Magallán's services. In October 2014, Magallán scored his first goal for Boca Juniors against River Plate in the Superclásico.

=== Ajax ===
He signed for Dutch club Ajax on 2 January 2019. He moved on loan to Spanish club Deportivo Alavés on 2 September 2019. Magallán scored his first goal for Alavés in a 2–0 win over Celta Vigo on 20 October 2019.

In September 2020 he moved on loan to Italian club Crotone. In August 2021 he moved on loan to Belgian club Anderlecht.

=== Elche ===
Magallán signed for Elche in January 2023.

== International career ==
He has played for Argentina at under-20 and under-23 level.

== Career statistics ==
=== Club ===
As of match played 19 May 2023

Club	Season	League			National Cup (Note: Includes Copa Argentina, KNVB Beker, Copa del Rey, Belgian Cup)		Continental (Note: Includes Copa Libertadores, Copa Sudamericana)		Other (Note: Includes Supercopa Argentina, Johan Cruyff Shield)		Total	
Club	Season	Division	Apps	Goals	Apps	Goals	Apps	Goals	Apps	Goals	Apps	Goals
Gimnasia La Plata	2010–11	Argentine Primera División	5	0	0	0	0	0	0	0	5	0
Gimnasia La Plata	2011–12	Argentine Primera División	21	0	2	0	0	0	0	0	23	0
Gimnasia La Plata	Total		26	0	2	0	0	0	0	0	28	0
Boca Juniors	2012–13	Argentine Primera División	8	0	0	0	3	0	0	0	11	0
Boca Juniors	2014	Argentine Primera División	9	1	0	0	2	0	0	0	11	1
Boca Juniors	2015	Argentine Primera División	1	0	0	0	0	0	0	0	1	0
Boca Juniors	2016–17	Argentine Primera División	6	0	0	0	0	0	0	0	6	0
Boca Juniors	2017–18	Argentine Primera División	25	0	3	0	5	0	1	0	34	0
Boca Juniors	2018–19	Argentine Primera División	8	1	3	1	8	0	0	0	19	2
Boca Juniors	Total		57	2	6	1	18	0	1	0	82	3
Rosario Central (loan)	2013–14	Argentine Primera División	11	0	0	0	0	0	0	0	11	0
Defensa y Justicia (loan)	2016	Argentine Primera División	16	1	1	0	0	0	0	0	17	1
Ajax	2018–19	Eredivisie	2	0	1	0	0	0	0	0	3	0
Ajax	2019–20	Eredivisie	0	0	0	0	0	0	1	0	1	0
Ajax	2020–21	Eredivisie	0	0	0	0	0	0	1	0	1	0
Ajax	2022–23	Eredivisie	2	0	0	0	0	0	0	0	2	0
Ajax	Total		4	0	1	0	0	0	2	0	7	0
Alavés (loan)	2019–20	La Liga	17	1	1	0	0	0	0	0	18	1
Crotone (loan)	2020–21	Serie A	28	1	0	0	0	0	0	0	28	1
Anderlecht (loan)	2021–22	Belgian First Division A	24	0	6	1	0	0	0	0	30	1
Elche	2022–23	La Liga	11	0	0	0	0	0	0	0	11	0
Career total			184	5	17	2	18	0	3	0	222	7

== Honours ==
Vélez Sarsfield

- Supercopa Internacional: 2024
