= Alan Pérez =

Alan Pérez may refer to:

- Alan Pérez (cyclist) (born 1982), Spanish road bicycle racer
- Alan Pérez (footballer) (born 1991), Argentine centre-back
