= Alan Pérez (footballer) =

Argentine footballer (born 1991)

Personal information
- Full name: Alan Damián Pérez
- Date of birth: 20 April 1991 (age 35)
- Place of birth: Lomas de Zamora, Argentina
- Height: 1.83 m (6 ft 0 in)
- Position: Centre-back

Team information
- Current team: Defensores de Belgrano

Youth career
- Boca Juniors

Senior career*
Years	Team	Apps	(Gls)
2012–2015	Boca Juniors	0	(0)
2012–2014	→ Boca Unidos (loan)	54	(1)
2014–2015	→ Magallanes (loan)	28	(0)
2016–2018	Boca Unidos	34	(0)
2018–2022	Atlanta	104	(1)
2023	Temperley	37	(1)
2024	Cusco	33	(0)
2025	Sport Huancayo	17	(0)
2026–	Defensores de Belgrano	9	(0)
- * Club domestic league appearances and goals as of 17:47, 25 April 2026 (UTC)

Alan Damián Pérez (born 20 April 1991) is an Argentine professional footballer who plays as a centre-back for Defensores de Belgrano.

== Career ==
Pérez came through the Boca Juniors academy, appearing twice at the 2012 U-20 Copa Libertadores. On 18 July 2012, Pérez was loaned to Boca Unidos in Primera B Nacional. He made fifty-seven appearances in two seasons with them, including for his senior debut on 10 August versus Gimnasia y Esgrima and for his first goal against Aldosivi on 19 March 2014. Three months later, Pérez joined Primera B de Chile side Magallanes on loan. He featured thirty-one times in 2014–15. In 2016, Pérez returned to Boca Unidos on permanent terms. Thirty-four matches followed, as he also received his fifth red card in six years.

On 10 July 2018, after suffering relegation from Primera B Nacional with Boca Unidos, Pérez signed for Primera B Metropolitana's Atlanta. His first appearance came in a two-goal win away from home on 21 September versus UAI Urquiza.

== Career statistics ==
As of 27 April 2019.

Appearances and goals by club, season and competition
Club	Season	League			Cup		League Cup		Continental		Other		Total	
Club	Season	Division	Apps	Goals	Apps	Goals	Apps	Goals	Apps	Goals	Apps	Goals	Apps	Goals
Boca Juniors	2012–13	Primera División	0	0	0	0	—		0	0	0	0	0	0
Boca Juniors	2013–14	Primera División	0	0	0	0	—		0	0	0	0	0	0
Boca Juniors	2014	Primera División	0	0	0	0	—		0	0	0	0	0	0
Boca Juniors	2015	Primera División	0	0	0	0	—		0	0	0	0	0	0
Boca Juniors	Total		0	0	0	0	—		0	0	0	0	0	0
Boca Unidos (loan)	2012–13	Primera B Nacional	20	0	3	0	—		—		0	0	23	0
Boca Unidos (loan)	2013–14	Primera B Nacional	34	1	0	0	—		—		0	0	34	1
Boca Unidos (loan)	Total		54	1	3	0	—		—		0	0	57	1
Magallanes (loan)	2014–15	Primera B	28	0	3	0	—		—		0	0	31	0
Boca Unidos	2016	Primera B Nacional	9	0	0	0	—		—		0	0	9	0
Boca Unidos	2016–17	Primera B Nacional	13	0	0	0	—		—		0	0	13	0
Boca Unidos	2017–18	Primera B Nacional	12	0	0	0	—		—		0	0	12	0
Boca Unidos	Total		34	0	0	0	—		—		0	0	34	0
Atlanta	2018–19	Primera B Metropolitana	22	0	0	0	—		—		0	0	22	0
Career total			138	1	6	0	—		0	0	0	0	144	1
