= Emanuel Insúa =

Argentine footballer (born 1991)

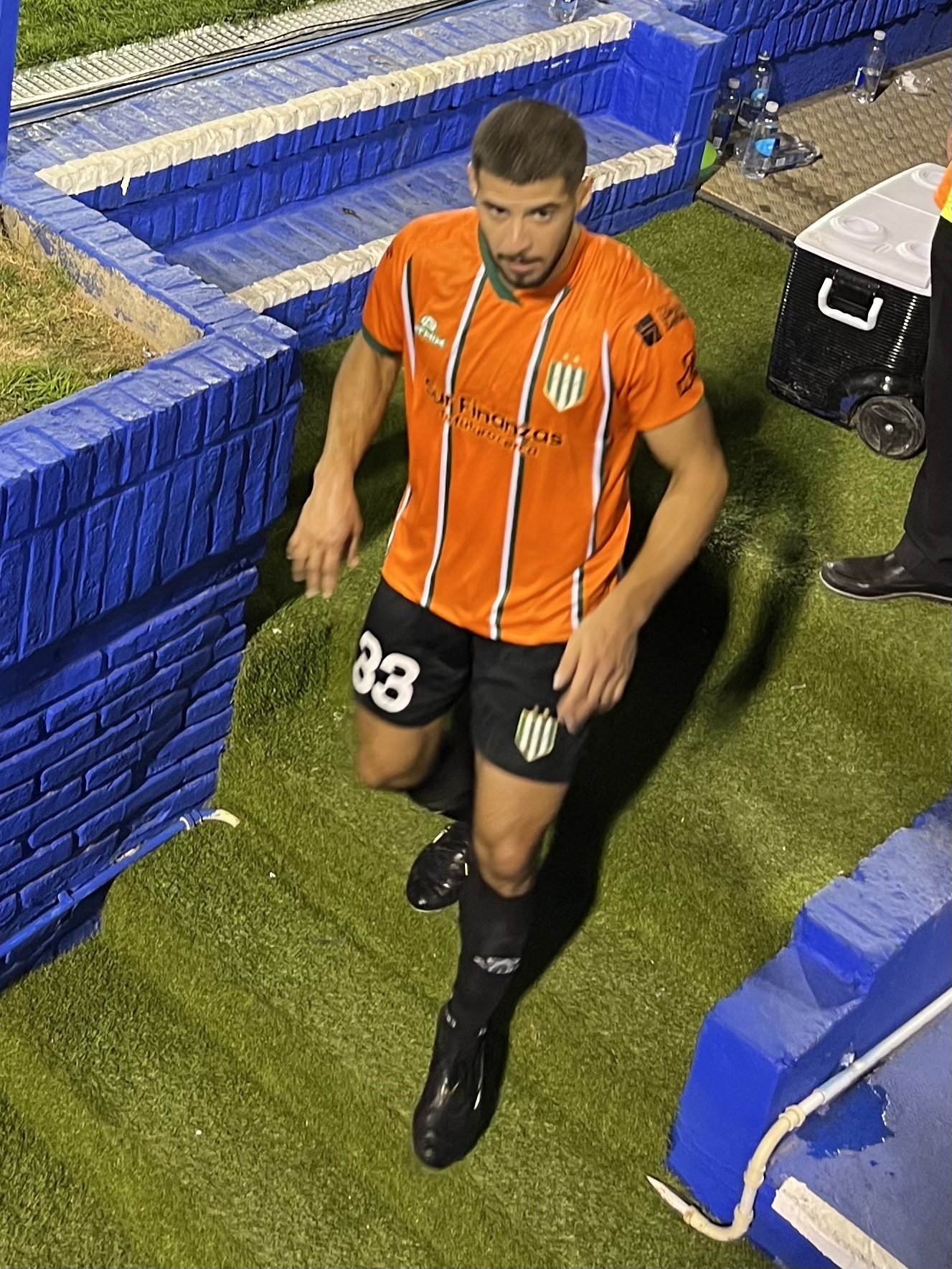
- Insúa in 2023

Personal information
- Full name: Emanuel Mariano Insúa Zapata
- Date of birth: 10 April 1991 (age 35)
- Place of birth: Buenos Aires, Argentina
- Height: 1.82 m (6 ft 0 in)
- Position: Left-back

Team information
- Current team: Colegiales

Youth career
- 2004–2012: Boca Juniors

Senior career*
Years	Team	Apps	(Gls)
2012–2015	Boca Juniors	38	(2)
2012–2013	→ Godoy Cruz (loan)	33	(1)
2015	Granada	12	(0)
2015–2017	Udinese	0	(0)
2016	→ Newells Old Boys (loan)	15	(2)
2016–2017	→ Racing Club (loan)	20	(0)
2017–2020	Panathinaikos	60	(4)
2020–2022	AEK Athens	13	(0)
2021	→ Aldosivi (loan)	27	(0)
2022	Vélez Sarsfield	18	(0)
2023–2025	Banfield	63	(2)
2025	Racing Ferrol	11	(0)
2025–2026	Athens Kallithea	11	(1)
2026–	Colegiales	7	(0)
- * Club domestic league appearances and goals as of 17:17, 25 April 2026 (UTC)

Emanuel Mariano Insúa Zapata (born 10 April 1991) is an Argentine professional footballer who plays as a left-back for Colegiales.

== Career ==
Born in Buenos Aires, Insúa was a Boca Juniors youth graduate. He made his professional debut on 25 April 2012, coming on as a late substitute in a 1–1 away draw against Olimpo, for the season's Copa Argentina.

Insúa made his league debut on 20 May, starting in a 2–0 away win against Racing Club. In July 2012 he was loaned to fellow league team Godoy Cruz, appearing in 33 matches; he also scored his first professional goal for the club, netting the last in a 2–0 home win against Atlético Rafaela on 19 August.

Insúa returned to Boca in June 2013, and was assigned to the main squad. He appeared more regularly with the club in the following campaigns. He scored his first goal for the Azul y Oro on 18 August, against the same opponent.

On 20 January 2015, Insúa signed a four-and-a-half-year contract with La Liga side Granada CF, for a transfer fee estimated in the region of €2.5 million. He made his debut in the competition five days later, starting and playing the full 90 minutes in a 2–2 away draw against Deportivo de La Coruña.

On 22 August 2015, Insúa was loaned to Genoa for one year, with a buyout clause, but eventually joined Udinese Calcio, for the kick off of the 2015–16 season. He managed to play only once with the club for Coppa Italia.

On 23 August 2017, Insúa left Udinese Calcio after one season and a half, mostly spent playing as loanee first for Newell's Old Boys, then for Racing Avellaneda, and officially signed over to Super League club Panathinaikos, on a three-year deal for an undisclosed fee. The Argentine left back is another who has failed to have an impact in the club. He has struggled to dislodge Niklas Hult from the starting side. He has found playing minutes hard to come by and his red card at PAOK will not win over any fans. If, as rumoured, Hult departs, the club will find itself in a sticky situation at left back. On 24 February 2018, Insúa changed direction skillfully with a cheeky backheel before sending a superb curling shot with the outside of his left foot past a hopeless Nikos Melissas, sealing the score in a 2–0 home win game. It was his first goal with the club. On 24 November 2018, Insúa scored after playing a neat one-two with Federico Macheda, in a hammering 5–1 home win game against struggling Apollon Smyrnis. On 6 April 2019, Insúa produced a magical goal as Panathinaikos moved to within five points of fifth-placed Aris after claiming a solid 2–0 home win over the Thessaloniki club at the Olympic Stadium. The Argentine met Omri Altman’s low cross perfectly and lofted the ball up and over Aris goalkeeper Julián Cuesta and into the net in stylish fashion.

On 13 August 2020, Insúa signed a three-year contract with AEK Athens. Overall, Insúa made 60 appearances in the Super League for Panathinaikos, contributing with four goals and three assists while impressing with his energetic, passionate approach on the left flank. Insúa has been signed as a direct replacement for fellow attacking full-back Niklas Hult. On 16 February 2021, he returned to Argentina and joined Primera División side Aldosivi on loan until June, where his brother Emiliano had also recently moved to. On 25 January 2022, after he solved his contract with AEK Athens, he signed a year contract with Argentine Primera División club Vélez Sarsfield for an undisclosed fee.

On 3 February 2025, Insúa signed with Racing de Ferrol in the Spanish second tier.

On 29 August 2025, he joined Super League Greece 2 club Athens Kallithea.

== Personal life ==
Insúa is the younger brother of fellow professional footballer Emiliano Insúa.

== Career statistics ==
=== Club ===
As of 7 April 2026

Appearances and goals by club, season and competition
Club	Season	League			National cup (Note: Includes Copa Argentina, Coppa Italia, Greek Cup)		Continental		Other		Total	
Club	Season	Division	Apps	Goals	Apps	Goals	Apps	Goals	Apps	Goals	Apps	Goals
Boca Juniors	2011–12	Primera División	1	0	1	0	—		—		2	0
Boca Juniors	2014	Primera División	25	1	1	0	3 (Note: Appearances in Copa Sudamericana)	0	—		29	1
Boca Juniors	2015	Primera División	12	1	—		—		—		12	1
Boca Juniors	Total		38	2	2	0	3	0	0	0	43	2
Godoy Cruz (loan)	2012–13	Primera División	33	1	1	0	—		—		34	1
Granada	2014–15	La Liga	12	0	—		—		—		12	0
Udinese	2015–16	Serie A	0	0	1	0	—		—		1	0
Newell's Old Boys (loan)	2016	Primera División	15	2	1	0	—		—		16	2
Racing Club (loan)	2016	Primera División	0	0	1	1	—		1 (Note: Appearance(s) in Copa Bicentenario)	0	2	1
Racing Club (loan)	2016–17	Primera División	20	0	0	0	1	0	—		21	0
Racing Club (loan)	Total		20	0	1	1	1	0	1	0	23	1
Panathinaikos	2017–18	Super League Greece	15	1	5	0	—		—		20	1
Panathinaikos	2018–19	Super League Greece	25	2	2	0	—		—		27	2
Panathinaikos	2019–20	Super League Greece	18	1	3	0	—		2 (Note: Appearance(s) in Super League Greece playoffs)	0	23	1
Panathinaikos	Total		58	4	10	0	0	0	2	0	70	4
AEK Athens	2020–21	Super League Greece	13	0	0	0	6 (Note: Appearance(s) in UEFA Europa League)	0	—		19	0
Racing Club (loan)	2021	Primera División	19	0	—		—		9 (Note: Appearance(s) in Copa de la Liga)	1	28	1
Vélez Sarsfield	2022	Primera División	8	0	0	0	—		10	0	18	0
Banfield	2023	Primera División	21	2	2	0	—		15	0	38	2
Banfield	2024	Primera División	13	0	2	0	—		14	0	29	0
Banfield	Total		34	2	4	0	0	0	29	0	47	2
Racing Ferrol	2024–25	Segunda Division	11	0	0	0	—		—		11	0
Athens Kallithea	2025–26	Super League 2	11	1	2	0	—		—		13	1
Colegiales	2026	Primera Nacional	5	0	0	0	—		—		5	0
Career total			277	12	22	1	10	0	51	1	360	14
