= Walter Serrano =

Argentinian footballer

Personal information
- Full name: Walter Omar Serrano
- Date of birth: 2 July 1986 (age 40)
- Place of birth: Villa Constitución, Argentina
- Height: 1.77 m (5 ft 9 1/2 in)
- Position: Midfielder

Team information
- Current team: Gudja United
- Number: 24

Youth career
- –2008: Atlético de Rafaela

Senior career*
Years	Team	Apps	(Gls)
2008–2017	Atlético de Rafaela	212	(9)
2013–2014	→ Argentinos Juniors (loan)	32	(0)
2017–2018	Godoy Cruz	4	(0)
2018–2020	Defensores Belgrano	41	(1)
2020	Cantolao	19	(0)
2021	Lija Athletic	10	(0)
2021-2023	Marsaxlokk	29	(5)
2023-	Gudja United	10	(0)
- * Club domestic league appearances and goals as of 13 May 2024

Walter Omar Serrano (born 2 July 1986) is an Argentine professional footballer who plays as a central midfielder for Maltese Premier League club Gudja United.

== Career ==
=== Club ===
Serrano began his career in 2008 with Atlético de Rafaela in Primera B Nacional, making his debut on 30 August against Quilmes. In his third appearance for Rafaela, versus Aldosivi, Serrano scored his first career goal. 147 more appearances came Serrano's way between 2008–09 and 2013–14, including 33 appearances during Rafaela's promotion-winning season of 2010–11. In 2013–14, Serrano joined Argentine Primera División side Argentinos Juniors on loan and subsequently went on to participate in 32 matches for the team. He returned to Rafaela in 2014 and then played in 28 games in the next four seasons for them before departing in 2017; throughout his time with Rafaela, he scored nine times. On 9 January 2017, Serrano completed a move to Primera División club Godoy Cruz.

== Career statistics ==
=== Club ===
As of 14 January 2017.

Club statistics
Club	Season	League			Cup (Note: Includes the Copa Argentina.)		League Cup		Continental (Note: Includes the Copa Libertadores and Copa Sudamericana)		Other		Total	
Club	Season	Division	Apps	Goals	Apps	Goals	Apps	Goals	Apps	Goals	Apps	Goals	Apps	Goals
Atlético de Rafaela	2008–09	Primera B Nacional	21	1	0	0	—		—		0	0	31	1
Atlético de Rafaela	2009–10	Primera B Nacional	31	2	0	0	—		—		0	0	31	2
Atlético de Rafaela	2010–11	Primera B Nacional	33	2	0	0	—		—		0	0	33	2
Atlético de Rafaela	2011–12	Primera División	36	1	0	0	—		—		0	0	36	1
Atlético de Rafaela	2012–13	Primera División	29	0	0	0	—		—		0	0	29	0
Atlético de Rafaela	2013–14	Primera División	0	0	0	0	—		—		0	0	0	0
Atlético de Rafaela	2014	Primera División	14	1	3	0	—		—		0	0	17	1
Atlético de Rafaela	2015	Primera División	25	2	2	0	—		—		0	0	27	2
Atlético de Rafaela	2016	Primera División	10	0	1	0	—		—		0	0	11	0
Atlético de Rafaela	2016–17	Primera División	13	0	1	0	—		—		0	0	14	0
Atlético de Rafaela	Total		212	9	7	0	—		—		0	0	219	9
Argentinos Juniors (loan)	2013–14	Primera División	32	0	0	0	—		—		0	0	32	0
Godoy Cruz	2016–17	Primera División	0	0	0	0	—		0	0	0	0	0	0
Godoy Cruz	Total		0	0	0	0	—		0	0	0	0	0	0
Career total			244	9	7	0	—		0	0	0	0	251	9

== Honours ==
=== Club ===
Atlético de Rafaela

- Primera B Nacional (1): 2010–11
