= Joel Acosta =

Argentine footballer (born 1991)

Personal information
- Full name: Joel Gustavo Acosta
- Date of birth: 16 January 1991 (age 35)
- Place of birth: Villa Gobernador Gálvez, Argentina
- Height: 1.77 m (5 ft 9 1/2 in)
- Position: Winger

Youth career
- Boca Juniors

Senior career*
Years	Team	Apps	(Gls)
2010–2016	Boca Juniors	8	(0)
2011–2012	→ Siena (loan)	0	(0)
2012–2013	→ Almirante Brown (loan)	23	(3)
2015	→ Olimpo (loan)	25	(1)
2016	Pescara	9	(0)
2016–2017	Aldosivi	18	(1)
2017–2018	O'Higgins	26	(7)
2018–2019	Apollon Smyrnis	20	(0)
2020	Liverpool Montevideo	1	(0)
- * Club domestic league appearances and goals as of 22:16, 16 September 2020 (UTC)

Joel Gustavo Acosta (born 16 January 1991) is an Argentine footballer who plays as a midfielder.

== Career ==
=== Club ===
Acosta made his professional debut for Boca Juniors on 24 October 2010 in a league game against Independiente Avellaneda. He came on as a substitute for Lucas Viatri in the 88th minute. The game ended 0-0. A little less than a year later, Acosta joined Italian Serie A club Siena on loan. His spell with Siena was unsuccessful as he failed to make an appearance and only made the club's bench on two occasions; both in the Coppa Italia. Shortly after returning to Boca, he was loaned out again as he agreed to join Primera B Nacional side Almirante Brown. He made his debut on 12 August 2012 versus Independiente Rivadavia. He made 25 appearances in all competitions for Almirante Brown before going back to his parent club. In the year and a half later, he played seven times for Boca in the Argentine Primera División. 2015 saw him join Olimpo on loan, he featured 25 times for Olimpo before departing.

In January 2016, Acosta left Boca Juniors and signed for Italian Serie B team Pescara. His first appearance in Italian football came on 12 February in a 1–1 draw against Vicenza. He participated in nine league matches for Pescara as the club won promotion to Serie A. Despite this, Acosta left Pescara soon after 2015–16 to return to Argentina to join Primera División club Aldosivi. He scored his first goal for Aldosivi in October 2016 versus San Martín.

== Career statistics ==
=== Club ===
As of 10 November 2016.

Club statistics
Club	Season	League			Cup (Note: Includes the Copa Argentina and Coppa Italia.)		League Cup		Continental (Note: Includes the Copa Libertadores and Copa Sudamericana.)		Other		Total	
Club	Season	Division	Apps	Goals	Apps	Goals	Apps	Goals	Apps	Goals	Apps	Goals	Apps	Goals
Boca Juniors	2010–11	Primera División	1	0	0	0	—		—		0	0	1	0
Boca Juniors	2011–12	Primera División	0	0	0	0	—		0	0	0	0	0	0
Boca Juniors	2012–13	Primera División	0	0	0	0	—		0	0	0	0	0	0
Boca Juniors	2013–14	Primera División	6	0	0	0	—		0	0	0	0	6	0
Boca Juniors	2014	Primera División	1	0	0	0	—		0	0	0	0	1	0
Boca Juniors	2015	Primera División	0	0	0	0	—		0	0	0	0	0	0
Boca Juniors	Total		8	0	0	0	—		0	0	0	0	8	0
Siena (loan)	2011–12	Serie A	0	0	0	0	—		—		0	0	0	0
Almirante Brown (loan)	2012–13	Primera B Nacional	23	3	2	0	—		—		0	0	25	3
Olimpo (loan)	2015	Primera División	25	1	0	0	—		—		0	0	25	1
Total			48	4	2	0	—		—		0	0	50	4
Pescara	2015–16	Serie B	9	0	0	0	—		—		0	0	9	0
Pescara	Total		9	0	0	0	—		—		0	0	9	0
Aldosivi	2016–17	Primera División	8	1	0	0	—		—		0	0	8	1
Aldosivi	Total		8	1	0	0	—		—		0	0	8	1
Career total			73	5	2	0	—		0	0	0	0	75	5
