= Fidencio Oviedo =

Paraguayan footballer (born 1987)

Personal information
- Full name: Fidencio Oviedo Domínguez
- Date of birth: 30 May 1987 (age 39)
- Place of birth: Ciudad del Este, Paraguay
- Height: 1.80 m (5 ft 11 in)
- Position: Defensive midfielder

Team information
- Current team: Fernando de la Mora

Youth career
- 3 de Febrero
- 1997–2004: Libertad

Senior career*
Years	Team	Apps	(Gls)
2005–2007	Libertad		
2006	→ 3 de Febrero (loan)	13	(1)
2006–2007	→ Tacuary (loan)		
2008	Sol de America		
2009–2010	Santiago Morning	61	(1)
2010–2011	Independiente CG	38	(2)
2012–2016	Cerro Porteño	152	(2)
2016–2017	Colón	15	(0)
2017	Guaraní	32	(0)
2018	Independiente	20	(0)
2019	Deportivo Santaní	35	(0)
2020	Bolívar	11	(0)
2021	3 de Febrero	--	(--)
2021–2022	Independiente Hernandarias	--	(--)
2022–	Fernando de la Mora	--	(--)

International career^{‡}
2011–	Paraguay	15	(0)
- * Club domestic league appearances and goals as of 17:15, 10 May 2020 (UTC) ‡ National team caps and goals as of 30 October 2017

Fidencio Oviedo Domínguez (born 30 May 1987), known as Fidencio Oviedo, is a Paraguayan footballer who plays for Fernando de la Mora in the División Intermedia. In 2012, Oviedo was named Paraguayan Footballer of the Year.

== Club career ==
=== Early career ===
Oviedo's mother took him to 3 de Febrero when he was 12 years old and he was trained at the club.

=== Libertad ===
==== 2005 season ====
In 2005, Oviedo played for Libertad's first-team where he colleagued with Francisco Arce, Carlos Bonet, Argentine midfielder Pablo Guiñazú, Uruguayan striker Hernan Rodrigo Lopez and young teammates Victor Caceres, Nestor Camacho and Edgar Benítez. He played in 1 game for Libertad in the 2005 Copa Libertadores.

==== 3 de Febrero (loan) ====
Oviedo shared the 2006 3 de Febrero squad with players as Wilson Mendez, the Uruguayan Raul Salazar and the Argentine Fernando Brandán.

==== Tacuary Asunción (loan) ====
At Tacuary Asunción in 2006, Oviedo shared the team with Japanese defender Riki Kitawaki, Argentine striker Fabián Caballero. He remained there until the 2007 season. Oviedo played in 2 games in the 2007 Copa Libertadores for Tacuary Asunción.

==== 2007 season ====
In 2007, Oviedo returned to Libertad's first-team to play along with Colombian Vladimir Marin, Argentine Javier Villarreal, Brazilian midfielder José Pedro Santos and experienced Paraguayan player Pedro Sarabia.

=== Sol de América ===
In 2008, Oviedo joined Club Sol de América with Libertad teammate Édgar Benítez, colleaguing in a team with Jose Ortigoza, Miguel Samudio, Argentine defender Emanuel Loeschbor, and Uruguayans Luis Cupla and Leonardo Bordad.

=== Santiago Morning ===
For the 2009 season at Chilean club Santiago Morning, Oviedo was joined in the defence with Argentine Alejandro Kruchowski and Chilean Pedro Rivera, and other teammates as Uruguayan Ivan Guillauma, Chilean forward Esteban Paredes, Argentine Diego Rivarola, Colombian Fabian Cuellar and compatriot Sergio Ortega. He scored 1 goal in 30 league games in the 2009 season for Santiago Morning. For the 2010 season, Oviedo continued at Santiago Morning. He accumulated 20 league appearances for the 2010 season.

=== Cerro Porteño ===
Before signing with Cerro Porteño, Olimpia Asunción president Marcelo Recanate confirmed that there was already a pre-agreement for Oviedo with Independiente CG's president. After interest from Olimpia Asunción, Libertad and Guaraní, Oviedo reached an agreement with Cerro Porteño.

==== 2012 season ====
Cerro Porteño paid USD $700, 000.00 for Oviedo's transfer from Independiente CG.

After being awarded Paraguayan Football of the Year in 2012, Oviedo then said that 2012 was an unforgettable year for him.

==== 2013 season ====
At the end of 2013, Oviedo had everything agreed by word to join Baniyas in Saudi Arabia. The deal was organised for six months and for a salary of US$100, 000.00 whilst Cerro Porteño would receive US$900, 000.00 in a deal which had the option to buy.

==== 2014 season ====
In December 2014, it was announced that Oviedo could continue his career in Mexico.

==== 2015 season ====
By January 2015, Mexican club Pachuca was firmly interested in Oviedo. Diego Alonso, Pachuca's coach, solicited Oviedo's contract. During January 2015, Oviedo departed Cerro Porteño's pre-season training camp in Argentina to return to Paraguay to close his signing with Pachuca. The transfer did not ultimately go through, which was already documented and agreed to be a one-year loan.

In March 2015, due to a previous act of indiscipline, he was not taken into account by Argentine coach Leonardo Astrada, and the club evaluated a transfer for him. In the same month, Oviedo returned to the squad when Astrada departed the club. First-team teammate Jonathan Fabbro admitted that he asked for Oviedo's return to the team. In July 2015, Oviedo returned to training from an injury.

In September 2015, he signed a contract extension with Cerro Porteño until the end of 2016.

In December 2015, HOY announced that Oviedo would not continue at Cerro Porteño for the following season and would be transferred or loaned.

==== 2016 season ====
Even though he held a contract until December 2016, it was revealed in May of the same year that Oviedo would depart Cerro Porteño at the end of the 2016 Torneo Apertura.

In July 2016, Oviedo and teammate Jonathan Santana both had their contracts terminated by Cerro Porteño due to acts of indiscipline.

Between 2013 and 2017, Oviedo played in 17 Copa Libertadores games for Cerro Porteño. Between 2012 and 2014, Oviedo scored 1 goal in 18 games for Cerro Porteño in the Copa Sudamericana.

=== Colón de Santa Fé ===
In August 2016, Colón de Santa Fé president José Vignatti travelled to Paraguay to concrete the incorporation of Oviedo. Oviedo joined on a free-transfer from Cerro Porteño.

At Colón de Santa Fé, Oviedo amassed 11 league appearances during the 2015–16 season.

=== Guaraní ===
In May 2018, Oviedo was separated from Guaraní's first-squad by coach Fernando Burgo, after being annoyed for being substituted off of the field in a game against General Díaz.

Oviedo played in a total of 5 Copa Libertadores games for Guaraní in the 2017 and 2018 tournaments.

=== Deportivo Santaní ===
In December 2018, it was reported that Deportivo Santani were after Oviedo for the following season. In the same month, Oviedo joined Deportivo Santani. Oviedo played in 4 games for Deportivo Santaní in the 2019 Copa Sudamericana. In November 2019, Oviedo showed that he was hurt by Deportivo Santani's descension to Paraguay's second-tier for the following year.

=== Bolívar ===
In December 2019, Oviedo joined Bolivian club Bolívar for the 2020 season. He signed until December 2020. Prior to joining Bolívar, Oviedo received other offers, but he opted for Bolívar because the club showed lots of interest in him for a long time. Bolívar was charged by coach Lorenzo Cabañas. During the COVID-19 pandemic in April 2020, Oviedo trained at his home as a Bolivar player, whilst in quarantine. Oviedo totalled 4 games for Bolivar in the 2020 Copa Libertadores. In November 2020, Oviedo scored for Bolívar in a victory against Oriente Petrolero. In January 2021, Tigo Sports announced that Oviedo would not continue at Bolivar.

=== 3 de Febrero ===
In March 2021, Versus announced that Oviedo was the new signing at 3 de Febrero for the 2021 Paraguayan División Intermedia season.

=== Independiente ===
In November 2021, Oviedo was presented at Independiente Hernandarias from the Liga Hernandariense and began training with his new teammates. Oviedo was also joined in the team by Arnaldo Pereira and Fabio Caballero.

=== Fernando de la Mora ===
In January 2022 of Paraguay's summer transfer window, Oviedo joined Fernando de la Mora.

== International career ==
On 2 September 2011, Oviedo debuted for Paraguay in a 2–0 away friendly match against Panama, being substituted onto the field in the 77th minute for Cristian Riveros. On 11 October 2013, he played in his first FIFA World Cup qualification game in a 1–1 away draw against Venezuela, being substituted onto the field in the 66th minute for Oscar Cardozo. On 31 March 2015, Oviedo played in his last game for Paraguay in 1–0 defeat against Mexico, playing the entire 90 minutes of the game and receiving a yellow card in the 55th minute.

== Personal life ==
Oviedo is from Ciudad del Este.

In 2021, Oviedo told Paraguayan newspaper Crónica that he idolised Italian footballer Gennaro Gattuso, and that locally, another idol was Paraguayan player Cristian Riveros.

== Honours ==
Club Libertad

- Primera División Paraguaya: Clausura 2007

Cerro Porteño

- Primera División Paraguaya: 2012
