= Sebastián Vidal =

Argentine footballer

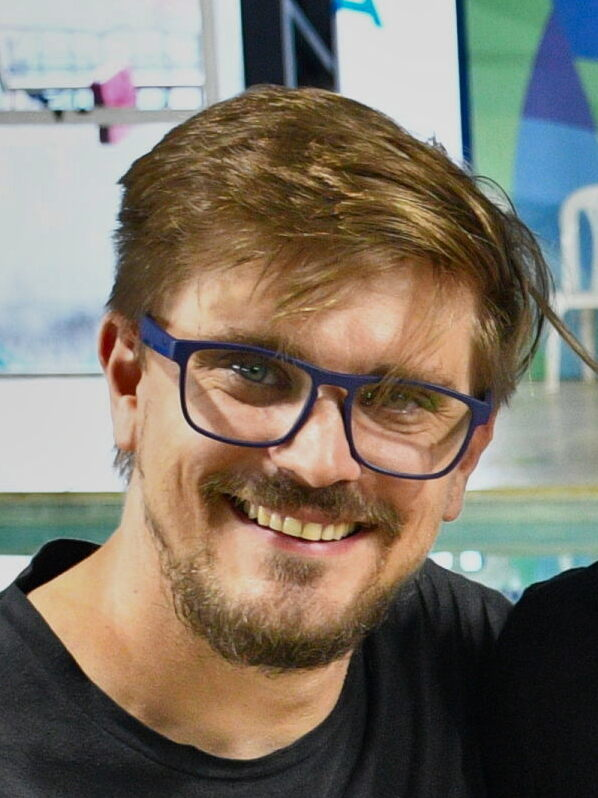

Personal information
- Date of birth: 18 April 1989 (age 36)
- Place of birth: Argentina
- Position: Midfielder

Senior career*
Years	Team	Apps	(Gls)
–2014	Boca Juniors	0	(0)
2009–2010	→ Comisión de Actividades Infantiles (loan)	16	(0)
2010–2012	→ Unión de Santa Fe (loan)	50	(0)
2012–2013	→ Club Atlético Patronato (loan)	27	(0)
2014	Club Atlético Temperley	3	(0)
2016	Estudiantes de Buenos Aires	8	(0)
2017–2018	Sportivo Dock Sud	30	(0)
2018–2019	CA Excursionistas	56	(0)
- * Club domestic league appearances and goals

Sebastián Vidal (born 18 April 1989, in Argentina) is an Argentine retired footballer.

== Career ==
After failing to make an appearance for Boca Juniors, Vidal played for Club Atlético Temperley, Estudiantes de Buenos Aires, as well as CA Excursionistas in the Argentine lower leagues.

At the age of 31, he retired to become sports secretary of Avellaneda.
