= Matías Zaragoza =

Argentine footballer

Personal information
- Full name: Matías Gastón Zaragoza
- Date of birth: 20 September 1995 (age 31)
- Place of birth: Libertad, Argentina
- Height: 1.70 m (5 ft 7 in)
- Position: Midfielder

Youth career
- 2011–2014: Boca Juniors

Senior career*
Years	Team	Apps	(Gls)
2014–2016	Boca Juniors	0	(0)
2016	→ Belshina Bobruisk (loan)	5	(1)
2017–2018	Boston River	13	(2)
2018–2019	Ferrocarril Midland		
- * Club domestic league appearances and goals as of 7 June 2018

Matías Zaragoza (born 20 September 1995) is an Argentinian former professional footballer.

In 2016, he was loaned to Belshina Bobruisk.
