= Emanuel Trípodi =

Argentine footballer

Personal information
- Full name: Emanuel Trípodi
- Date of birth: January 8, 1981 (age 45)
- Place of birth: Comodoro Rivadavia, Argentina
- Height: 1.85 m (6 ft 1 in)
- Position: Goalkeeper

Youth career
- Boca Juniors

Senior career*
Years	Team	Apps	(Gls)
2002–2005	Unión	3	(0)
2005–2009	CAI	150	(1)
2009–2013	Quilmes	135	(0)
2013–2015	Boca Juniors	7	(0)
2015–2016	CA Sarmiento	16	(0)
2016–2017	Argentinos Juniors	4	(0)
2017	Chacarita Juniors	25	(0)
2017–2018	Quilmes	22	(0)
2018–2019	Agropecuario	10	(0)
2019–2021	Chacarita Juniors	61	(0)
- * Club domestic league appearances and goals as of 19:11, 10 July 2022 (UTC)

Emanuel Trípodi (born January 8, 1981), is an Argentine football goalkeeper.

== Club career ==
Trípodi made his professional debut for Unión, then he was transferred to CAI where he lived an unusual fact: he scored a goal. after this, in 2009 he joined Quilmes, he managed to get promoted two times with Quilmes. in 2013 he joined Boca Juniors.
