= Leandro Marín =

Argentine footballer

Personal information
- Full name: Lucas Leandro Marín
- Date of birth: 22 January 1992 (age 34)
- Place of birth: Neuquén, Argentina
- Height: 1.78 m (5 ft 10 in)
- Position: Right-back

Team information
- Current team: Inter de Madrid
- Number: 2

Youth career
- 2008–2010: Boca Juniors

Senior career*
Years	Team	Apps	(Gls)
2010–2017	Boca Juniors	39	(1)
2016	→ Tigre (loan)	11	(0)
2016–2017	→ Arsenal Sarandí (loan)	28	(1)
2017–2018	Lausanne-Sport	24	(2)
2019–2021	Patronato	33	(1)
2022–	Inter de Madrid	6	(0)
- * Club domestic league appearances and goals as of 19:20, 15 April 2022 (UTC)

Lucas Leandro Marín (born 22 January 1992) is an Argentine footballer who plays for Spanish club Inter de Madrid as a right-back.

== Club career ==
Leandro scored his first goal against Rosario Central in the 2014 Copa Sudamericana on 4 September 2014, the match ended 1-1.

== Career statistics ==
As of match played on 19 April 2018

Appearances and goals by club, season and competition
Club	Season	League			Cup		League Cup		Other		Total	
Club	Season	Division	Apps	Goals	Apps	Goals	Apps	Goals	Apps	Goals	Apps	Goals
Boca Juniors	2009–10	Argentine Primera División	1	0	0	0	—				1	0
Boca Juniors	2010–11	Argentine Primera División	2	0	0	0	—				2	0
Boca Juniors	2012–13	Argentine Primera División	7	0	1	0	—		5 (Note: Appearance(s) in the Copa Libertadores)	0	13	0
Boca Juniors	2013–14	Argentine Primera División	11	0	1	0	—				12	0
Boca Juniors	2014	Argentine Primera División	13	1	0	0	—		7 (Note: Appearance(s) in the Copa Sudamericana)	1	20	2
Boca Juniors	2015	Argentine Primera División	5	0	1	0	—		7 (Note: Six Appearances in the Copa Libertadores and One Appearance in the Copa Libertadores play-off)	1	13	1
Boca Juniors	2016	Argentine Primera División	0	0	0	0	—		2 (Note: Appearance(s) in the Torneos de Verano)	0	2	0
Boca Juniors	Total		39	1	3	0	0	0	21	2	63	3
Tigre (loan)	2016	Argentine Primera División	11	0	0	0	—				11	0
Arsenal (loan)	2016–17	Argentine Primera División	28	1	1	0	—		2	0	31	1
Lausanne-Sport	2017–18	Swiss Super League	22	2	1	0	—				23	2
Career totals			100	4	5	0	0	0	23	2	128	6
