= Manuel Vicentini =

Argentine footballer

Personal information
- Full name: Manuel Matías Vicentini
- Date of birth: August 29, 1990 (age 36)
- Place of birth: Sanford, Argentina
- Height: 1.80 m (5 ft 11 in)
- Position: Goalkeeper

Team information
- Current team: Belgrano
- Number: 23

Youth career
- Boca Juniors

Senior career*
Years	Team	Apps	(Gls)
2012–2015	Boca Juniors	0	(0)
2015–2023	Sarmiento	102	(0)
2022	→ Belgrano (loan)	2	(0)
2023–	Belgrano	7	(0)
2024	→ Colón (loan)	35	(0)
- * Club domestic league appearances and goals as of 18:25, 3 December 2025 (UTC)

Manuel Matías Vicentini (born August 29, 1990), is an Argentine professional footballer who plays as a goalkeeper who plays for Belgrano.

== Honours ==
Sarmiento

- Primera Nacional: 2020

Belgrano

- Primera Nacional: 2022
