= Gonzalo Castellani =

Argentine footballer

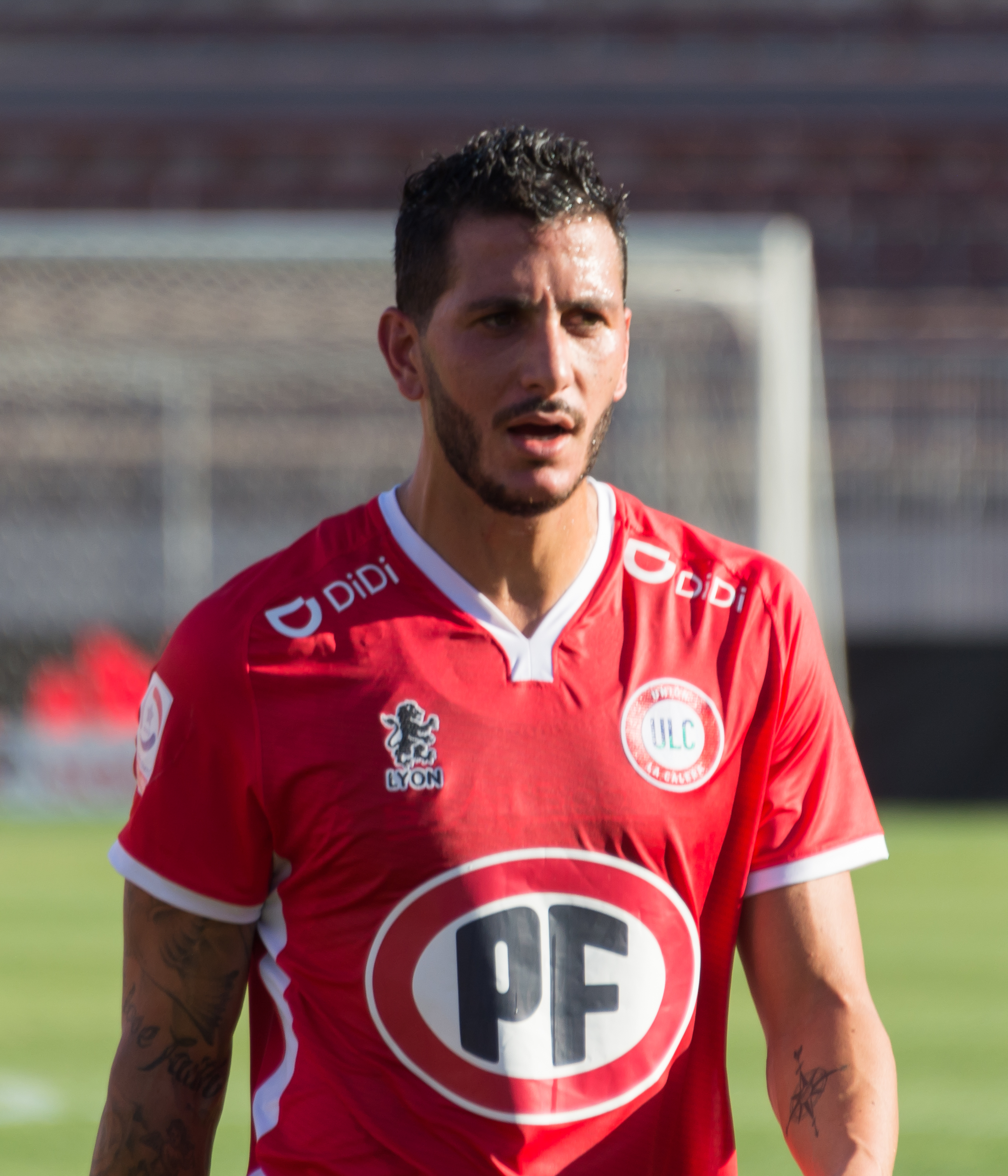
- Castellani with Unión La Calera in 2020

Personal information
- Full name: Gonzalo Pablo Castellani
- Date of birth: 10 August 1987 (age 39)
- Place of birth: Buenos Aires, Argentina
- Height: 1.79 m (5 ft 10 in)
- Position: Midfielder

Team information
- Current team: Ferro Carril Oeste

Youth career
- Ferro Carril Oeste

Senior career*
Years	Team	Apps	(Gls)
2006–2010	Ferro Carril Oeste	102	(12)
2010–2011	Villarreal B	29	(0)
2011–2012	Villarreal	10	(0)
2012–2014	Godoy Cruz	65	(7)
2014–2017	Boca Juniors	17	(0)
2015–2016	→ Lanús (loan)	11	(0)
2016–2017	→ Defensa y Justicia (loan)	33	(2)
2018	Atlético Nacional	36	(1)
2019	San Lorenzo	8	(0)
2019	Atlético Tucumán	15	(0)
2020–2022	Unión La Calera	49	(6)
2023	Defensa y Justicia	21	(0)
2024	Colo-Colo	15	(0)
2025	Ferro Carril Oeste	14	(0)
2025	Unión Española	13	(1)
2026–	Ferro Carril Oeste	5	(0)
- * Club domestic league appearances and goals as of 17:31, 11 April 2026 (UTC)

Gonzalo Pablo Castellani (born 10 August 1987 in Buenos Aires) is an Argentine footballer who plays as a midfielder for Ferro Carril Oeste.

== Club career ==
Castellani started his professional career with local Ferro Carril Oeste, competing in Primera B Nacional with the Buenos Aires outfit. On 2 January 2010 he moved to Spain and signed for Villarreal CF, being assigned to its B team in Segunda División; he failed to make any appearances for the club during the season, due to the team's excessive number of foreign players.

Castellani made his official debut for Villarreal B on 16 January 2011, starting in a 0–2 away loss against Recreativo de Huelva. On 18 December he first appeared in La Liga with the main squad, replacing Cani in the 64th minute of a 1–2 defeat at CA Osasuna.

On 6 July 2012, after both squads' relegation, Castellani joined Godoy Cruz in his native country. Two years later he moved to Boca Juniors, also in the top division.

In March 2024, Castellani returned to Chile after his stint with Unión La Calera in 2022 and joined Colo-Colo.

In the first half of 2025, Castellani played for Ferro Carril Oeste. On 25 July 2025, he joined Chilean club Unión Española. In January 2026, he rejoined Ferro Carril Oeste.

== Honours ==
Boca Juniors

- Argentine Primera División: 2015, 2017

Lanús

- Argentine Primera División: 2016

Atlético Nacional

- Copa Colombia: 2018
