= 2014–15 Campeonato Nacional Primera B =

Primera B de Chile
- Season: 2014–15
- Champions: San Luis de Quillota
- Promoted: San Luis de Quillota
- Relegated: Lota Schwager

The 2014–15 Primera B de Chile was the 65th completed season of the Primera B de Chile.

San Luis de Quillota was the tournament's champion.

== League table ==
Pos	Team	Pld	W	D	L	GF	GA	GD	Pts	Perf.
1	San Luis	38	24	9	5	61	32	+29	81	70.3%
2	Unión San Felipe	38	22	6	10	80	45	+35	72	63.2%
3	Everton	38	18	8	12	50	46	+4	62	54.3%
4	Deportes Concepción	38	17	7	14	50	56	−6	58	50.9%
5	Deportes Copiapó	38	14	14	10	45	46	−1	56	49.1%
6	Deportes Temuco	38	15	9	14	49	52	−3	54	47.4%
7	Iberia	38	15	8	15	47	46	+1	53	45.0%
8	Santiago Morning	38	14	7	17	46	44	+2	49	44.1%
9	Curicó Unido	38	12	11	15	49	48	+1	46 (Note: 1 point deducted due to contempt of its coach Germán Corengia)	40.4%
10	Rangers	38	10	13	15	38	48	−10	43	37.7%
11	Deportes La Serena	38	11	10	17	41	52	−11	43	37.7%
12	Magallanes	38	10	11	17	36	48	−12	41	36.9%
13	Coquimbo Unido	38	9	13	16	52	60	−8	40	36.0%
14	Lota Schwager	38	7	10	21	38	59	−21	31	27.2%
