= Sebastián D'Angelo =

Argentine footballer

Sebastián D´Angelo
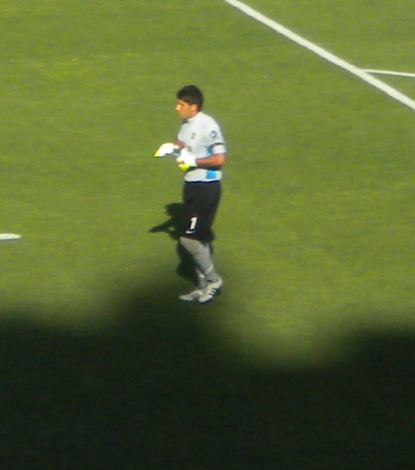

Personal information
- Full name: Sebastián Ezequiel D´Angelo
- Date of birth: January 14, 1989 (age 37)
- Place of birth: San Carlos de Bariloche, Argentina
- Height: 1.83 m (6 ft 0 in)
- Position: Goalkeeper

Team information
- Current team: América de Quito

Senior career*
Years	Team	Apps	(Gls)
2011–2015	Boca Juniors	4	(0)
2015	→ Tigre (loan)	10	(0)
2015–2017	Newell's Old Boys	4	(0)
2018	Sportivo Luqueño	4	(0)
2018	Atenas	6	(0)
2019	Central Norte	2	(0)
2020–	América de Quito	0	(0)
- * Club domestic league appearances and goals as of 03:11, 25 January 2020 (UTC)

Sebastián Ezequiel D´Angelo (born 1989) is an Argentine football goalkeeper who currently plays for América de Quito.

== Career ==
=== América de Quito ===
On 21 January 2020 it was confirmed, that D'Angelo had joined Ecuadorian club América de Quito.
