= Mauricio Tévez =

Argentine footballer

Personal information
- Full name: Mauricio Alejandro Tévez
- Date of birth: 31 July 1996 (age 30)
- Place of birth: Rosario, Argentina
- Height: 1.70 m (5 ft 7 in)
- Position: Forward

Team information
- Current team: Estudiantes RC
- Number: 20

Youth career
- Newell's Old Boys

Senior career*
Years	Team	Apps	(Gls)
2014–2019	Newell's Old Boys	52	(3)
2018	→ Instituto (loan)	13	(1)
2018–2019	→ Defensa y Justicia (loan)	5	(0)
2020	AD Oliveirense	6	(0)
2020–2021	Sportivo Luqueño	4	(0)
2021–2022	Guaireña	0	(0)
2022–2023	Chacarita Juniors	13	(0)
2023–2024	Douglas Haig	27	(2)
2024–	Estudiantes RC	26	(0)
- * Club domestic league appearances and goals as of 17:20, 11 May 2026 (UTC)

Mauricio Alejandro Tévez (born 31 July 1996) is an Argentine footballer who plays as a forward for Estudiantes RC.

== Club career ==
Tévez is a youth exponent from Newell's Old Boys. He made his league debut at 10 August 2014 against Boca Juniors in a 0–1 away win. Tévez scored the only goal of the game.
