= Mariano Echeverría =

Argentine footballer and coach

Personal information
- Full name: Mariano Raúl Echeverría
- Date of birth: 27 May 1981 (age 45)
- Place of birth: Mar del Plata, Argentina
- Height: 1.90 m (6 ft 3 in)
- Position: Centre back

Team information
- Current team: Johor Darul Ta'zim II (Head coach)

Senior career*
Years	Team	Apps	(Gls)
2002–2005	Provincial Valencia		(?)
2003	→ San Lorenzo MdP (loan)		(?)
2005–2006	Villa Atuel	24	(4)
2006–2007	Luján de Cuyo	26	(1)
2007–2008	Municipal Valencia	27	(0)
2008–2009	Deportivo Maipú	61	(6)
2009–2010	Chacarita Juniors	71	(7)
2010–2012	Tigre	92	(8)
2013–2014	Arsenal	32	(8)
2014	Boca Juniors	13	(2)
2015–2017	Tigre	21	(0)
2017	Ferro Carril Oeste	10	(0)

International career
2010	Argentina	1	(0)

Managerial career
- 2018–2019: Tigre
- 2021: Huracán (assistant)
- 2022–: Johor Darul Ta'zim II
- * Club domestic league appearances and goals

Mariano Raúl Echeverría (born 27 May 1981) is a retired Argentine footballer. He is currently the head coach of Malaysia A1 Semi-Pro League club Johor Darul Ta'zim II.

== Career ==
=== Club career ===
Echeverría began his playing career in the lower leagues of Argentine football. After many years playing for teams such as Luján de Cuyo and Deportivo Maipú in the regionalised lower divisions he joined 2nd division side Chacarita Juniors. In his first season with the club they won promotion to the Primera División.

=== International career ===
Echeverría made his debut for the Argentina national team after being called up to join Diego Maradona's squad of Argentina-based players who beat Jamaica 2–1 on 10 February 2010.

== Coaching career ==
=== Tigre ===
On 5 October 2018, Echeverría was appointed as the new head coach of Tigre, which was his first real coaching job. Three days after a 4–4 result on 8 February 2019 against Club Atlético Banfield, Echeverría resigned from his position. Echeverría had been furious about the result and the performance of his team.

=== Huracán ===
On 26 March 2021, Echeverría joined Primera División club Huracán as the assistant to Frank Kudelka.

=== Johor Darul Ta'zim II ===
Echeverría was appointed as a new head coach for Johor Darul Ta'zim II of Malaysia on 4 February 2022.

== Honours ==
=== Johor Darul Ta'zim II ===
- Malaysia Premier League: 2022
