= Arnaldo Pereira =

Paraguayan footballer

Personal information
- Full name: Arnaldo Javier Pereira Vera
- Date of birth: 11 January 1986 (age 40)
- Place of birth: Caaguazú, Paraguay
- Height: 1.81 m (5 ft 11 in)
- Position: Defender

Youth career
- Sagrado Corazón de Jesús
- 2003–2005: Libertad

Senior career*
Years	Team	Apps	(Gls)
2005–2007	Libertad		
2006–2007	→ 3 de Febrero (loan)	34	(0)
2008–2009	3 de Febrero	32	(2)
2008	→ Cerro Porteño PF (loan)		
2010	Sol de América	4	(0)
2010	Sport Colombia	9	(0)
2011	Lota Schwager	6	(0)
2011–2012	3 de Febrero	16	(0)
2013	Deportivo Capiatá	21	(2)
2013–2014	Alianza Petrolera	24	(0)
2014	Deportivo Capiatá	7	(0)
2015	Sol de América	17	(0)
2015	Rubio Ñu	19	(1)
2016	Deportivo Capiatá	6	(0)
2016	Guabirá	20	(0)
2017	Sportivo Luqueño	8	(0)
2017	Guaraní Antonio Franco	8	(0)
2018	Sportivo San Lorenzo	9	(0)
2019–2020	Rubio Ñu		
2021	Atyrá		
2022–2023	Patriotas		
2023	3 de Febrero FBC		
2023	Deportivo Capiatá		

Managerial career
- 2016: Guabirá (caretaker)
- * Club domestic league appearances and goals

Arnaldo Javier Pereira Vera (born 11 January 1985) is a Paraguayan former professional footballer.

== Club career ==
- (Paraguay) Libertad 2005–2006
- (Paraguay) 3 de Febrero 2006–2007
- (Paraguay) Libertad 2007
- (Paraguay) 3 de Febrero 2008
- (Paraguay) Cerro Porteño PF 2008
- (Paraguay) 3 de Febrero 2009
- (Paraguay) Sol de América 2010
- (Paraguay) Sport Colombia 2010
- (Chile) Lota Schwager 2011
- (Paraguay) 3 de Febrero 2011–2012
- (Paraguay) Deportivo Capiatá 2013
- (Colombia) Alianza Petrolera 2013–2014
- (Paraguay) Deportivo Capiatá 2014
- (Paraguay) Sol de América 2015
- (Paraguay) Rubio Ñu 2015
- (Paraguay) Deportivo Capiatá 2016
- (Bolivia) Guabirá 2016
- (Paraguay) Sportivo Luqueño 2017
- (Argentina) Guaraní Antonio Franco 2017
- (Paraguay) Sportivo San Lorenzo 2018
- (Paraguay) Rubio Ñu 2019–2020
- (Paraguay) Atyrá 2021
- (Paraguay) Patriotas 2022–2023
- (Paraguay) 3 de Febrero FBC 2023
- (Paraguay) Deportivo Capiatá 2023

== Coaching career ==
At the same time Pereira played for Bolivian club Guabirá, he coached the team for three matches after the coach Hugo Sosa returned to the youth system.
