= 2013–14 Argentine Primera División season =

123rd season of top-tier football league in Argentina

Primera División
- Season: 2013–14
- Champions: Torneo Inicial: San Lorenzo (15th title); Torneo Final: River Plate (36th title)
- Relegated: Argentinos Juniors; All Boys; Colón
- 2014 Copa Libertadores: San Lorenzo; Lanús (via 2013 Copa Sudamericana); Arsenal (via 2012–13 Copa Argentina)
- 2014 Copa Sudamericana: Boca Juniors; Estudiantes (LP); Gimnasia y Esgrima (LP); Godoy Cruz; Rosario Central; River Plate; Lanús (via 2013 Copa Sudamericana)
- 2015 Copa Libertadores: River Plate; Boca Juniors
- Matches: 383
- Goals: 812 (2.12 per match)
- Top goalscorer: Torneo Inicial: César Pereyra (10 goals); Torneo Final: Mauro Zárate (13 goals)
- Biggest home win: River Plate 5–0 Quilmes (May 18, 2014)
- Biggest away win: Arsenal 1–4 Belgrano (Nov. 30, 2013); San Lorenzo 1–4 Lanús (Apr. 12, 2014); Racing 0–3 San Lorenzo (Aug. 9, 2013); San Lorenzo 0–3 Argentinos Juniors (Aug. 17, 2013); Colón 0–3 Lanús (Oct. 19, 2013); Lanús 0–3 Atlético de Rafaela (Feb. 16, 2014)
- Highest scoring: San Lorenzo 4–2 Belgrano (Nov. 16, 2013); Vélez Sarsfield 5–1 Gimnasia y Esgrima (LP) (Mar. 29, 2014); Racing 3–3 Estudiantes (LP) (Apr. 1, 2014); Boca Juniors 4–2 Arsenal (Apr. 27, 2014); Newell's Old Boys 4–2 All Boys (May 10, 2014) (6 goals)
- Longest winning run: Gimnasia y Esgrima (LP) -6 matches- (Apr. 3 - Apr. 26, 2014)
- Longest unbeaten run: Arsenal (Aug. 2 - Oct. 12, 2013); Vélez Sarsfield (Oct. 18, 2013 - Feb. 18, 2014); Estudiantes (LP) (Mar. 2 - Apr. 19, 2014) (11 matches)
- Longest losing run: Racing (Sep. 15 - Oct. 18, 2013); Colón (Nov. 10, 2013 - Feb. 8, 2014); Argentinos Juniors (Apr. 15 - May 17, 2014) (6 matches)

The 2013–14 Primera División season was the 123rd season of top-flight professional football in Argentina. It started on August 2, 2013 and ended on May 24, 2014. Twenty teams competed in the league, seventeen returning from the 2012–13 season and three promoted from the Primera B Nacional Championship (Championship winners Rosario Central, runners-up Gimnasia y Esgrima (LP) and 3rd place Olimpo). For first time Independiente did not compete in the Primera División championship.

In the first half of the season San Lorenzo became champion of the 2013 Torneo Inicial "Nietos Recuperados", winning the “Miguel Benancio Sánchez” League Cup. The winner of the 2014 Torneo Final "Nietos Recuperados", River Plate, won the "Presidente Raúl Alfonsín" League Cup. In the Superfinal, River Plate won the Campeonato Cup after a 1–0 victory over San Lorenzo in La Punta, San Luis.

Argentinos Juniors and All Boys were relegated to the Primera B Nacional Championship. The third relegated team was Colón, who lost a playoff match against Atlético de Rafaela.

== Format ==
There was two champions in the season. The champions (Torneo Inicial and Torneo Final winners) met in a season ending championship final to determine the super champion. The format for each tournament remained the same as in previous seasons.

As in the previous season the last three teams on the relegation (average) table were directly relegated.

== Teams ==
The relegated teams of 2012–13 season were San Martín (SJ), Independiente and Unión. They played in the 2013–14 Primera B Nacional Championship. At the same time the 2012–13 Primera B Nacional Championship winners Rosario Central, runners-up Gimnasia y Esgrima (LP) and 3rd place Olimpo were promoted at the end of the season.

=== Stadia and locations ===
Locations of the 2013−14 Primera División teams outside Greater Buenos Aires.
Locations of the 2013−14 Primera División teams within Greater Buenos Aires.

Club	City	Stadium	Capacity
All Boys	Buenos Aires	Islas Malvinas	21,000
Argentinos Juniors	Buenos Aires	Diego Armando Maradona	24,800
Arsenal	Sarandí	Julio H. Grondona	16,300
Atlético de Rafaela	Rafaela	Nuevo Monumental	16,000
Belgrano	Córdoba	Julio César Villagra	28,000
Boca Juniors	Buenos Aires	Alberto J. Armando	49,000
Colón	Santa Fe	Brigadier General Estanislao López	33,500
Estudiantes (LP)	La Plata	Ciudad de La Plata	53,000
Gimnasia y Esgrima (LP)	La Plata	Juan Carmelo Zerillo	24,544
Godoy Cruz	Godoy Cruz	Malvinas Argentinas	40,268
Lanús	Lanús	Ciudad de Lanús - Néstor Díaz Pérez	46,619
Newell's Old Boys	Rosario	Marcelo Bielsa	38,095
Olimpo	Bahía Blanca	Roberto Natalio Carminatti	20,000
Quilmes	Quilmes	Centenario	30,200
Racing	Avellaneda	Presidente Juan Domingo Perón	55,389
River Plate	Buenos Aires	Monumental Antonio Vespucio Liberti	64,624
Rosario Central	Rosario	Dr. Lisandro de la Torre	41,654
San Lorenzo	Buenos Aires	Pedro Bidegain	39,494
Tigre	Victoria	José Dellagiovanna	26,282
Vélez Sarsfield	Buenos Aires	José Amalfitani	45,540

=== Personnel and kits ===
Club	Manager	Kit manufacturer	Main sponsor
All Boys	(Argentina) Ricardo Rodríguez	Balonpie	Lácteos Barraza
Argentinos Juniors	(Argentina) Claudio Borghi	Joma	Liderar Seguros
Arsenal	(Argentina) Martín Palermo	Lotto	La Nueva Seguros
Atlético de Rafaela	(Argentina) Jorge Burruchaga	Reusch	SanCor
Belgrano	(Argentina) Ricardo Zielinski	Lotto	Tersuave
Boca Juniors	(Argentina) Carlos Bianchi	Nike	BBVA Banco Francés
Colón	(Argentina) Diego Osella	Umbro	Flecha Bus
Estudiantes (LP)	(Argentina) Mauricio Pellegrino	Adidas	DirecTV
Gimnasia y Esgrima (LP)	(Argentina) Pedro Troglio	Penalty	Liderar Seguros
Godoy Cruz	(Argentina) Jorge Almirón	Lotto	Mendoza Espíritu Grande
Lanús	(Argentina) Guillermo Barros Schelotto	KDY	Cerámicas Lourdes
Newell's Old Boys	(Argentina) Ricardo Lunari	Topper	Motomel
Olimpo	(Argentina) Walter Perazzo	Kappa	Bingo Bahía
Quilmes	(Argentina) Ricardo Caruso Lombardi	Lotto	Quilmes
Racing	(Argentina) Fabio Radaelli	Olympikus	Banco Hipotecario
River Plate	(Argentina) Ramón Díaz	Adidas	BBVA Banco Francés
Rosario Central	(Argentina) Miguel Ángel Russo	Olympikus	Ingeconser
San Lorenzo	(Argentina) Edgardo Bauza	Lotto	Banco Ciudad
Tigre	(Argentina) Fabián Alegre	Kappa	Banco Macro
Vélez Sarsfield	(Argentina) José Oscar Flores	Topper	Samsung

=== Managerial changes ===
Team	Outgoing manager	Manner of departure	Date of vacancy	Replaced by	Date of appointment	Position in table
Pre-season changes
Quilmes	(Argentina) Omar De Felippe	Resigned	June 22, 2013	(Argentina) Nelson Vivas	June 24, 2013	N/A
All Boys	(Argentina) José Romero	Contract terminated	June 23, 2013	(Argentina) Julio César Falcioni	June 24, 2013	N/A
Colón	(Argentina) Pablo Morant	Replaced	June 29, 2013	(Argentina) Rubén Forestello	June 29, 2013	N/A
Tigre	(Argentina) Néstor Gorosito	Resigned	July 6, 2013	(Argentina) Diego Cagna	July 8, 2013	N/A
Newell's Old Boys	(Argentina) Gerardo Martino	Contract terminated	July 10, 2013	(Argentina) Alfredo Berti	July 10, 2013	N/A
Torneo Inicial changes
Racing	(Argentina) Luis Zubeldía	Resigned	August 24, 2013	(Argentina) Carlos Ischia ^{1}	August 30, 2013	20th
Tigre	(Argentina) Diego Cagna	Sacked	September 10, 2013	(Argentina) Fabián Alegre ^{2}	September 10, 2013	19th
Racing	(Argentina) Carlos Ischia	Resigned	October 7, 2013	(Argentina) Reinaldo Merlo ^{3}	October 10, 2013	20th
Colón	(Argentina) Rubén Forestello	Resigned	October 7, 2013	(Argentina) Mario Sciacqua ^{4}	October 8, 2013	17th
Quilmes	(Argentina) Nelson Vivas	Resigned	October 21, 2013	(Argentina) Blas Giunta	October 22, 2013	16th
All Boys	(Argentina) Julio César Falcioni	Resigned	November 16, 2013	(Argentina) Ricardo Rodríguez	November 19, 2013	17th
Inter-tournament changes
Godoy Cruz	(Argentina) Martín Palermo	Contract terminated	December 6, 2013	(Argentina) Jorge Almirón	December 9, 2013	N/A
Argentinos Juniors	(Argentina) Ricardo Caruso Lombardi	Mutual agreement	December 10, 2013	(Argentina) Claudio Borghi	December 29, 2013	N/A
San Lorenzo	(Spain) Juan Antonio Pizzi	Resigned	December 20, 2013	(Argentina) Edgardo Bauza	December 26, 2013	N/A
Vélez Sarsfield	(Argentina) Ricardo Gareca	Contract terminated	December 23, 2013	(Argentina) José Oscar Flores	December 26, 2013	N/A
Colón	(Argentina) Mario Sciacqua	Replaced	January 1, 2014	(Argentina) Diego Osella	January 1, 2014	N/A
Torneo Final changes
Quilmes	(Argentina) Blas Giunta	Sacked	February 16, 2014	(Argentina) Ricardo Caruso Lombardi	February 18, 2014	20th
Newell's Old Boys	(Argentina) Alfredo Berti	Resigned	April 11, 2014	(Argentina) Ricardo Lunari ^{5}	April 11, 2014	14th
Arsenal	(Argentina) Gustavo Alfaro	Sacked	April 14, 2014	(Argentina) Martín Palermo ^{6}	April 15, 2014	20th
Racing	(Argentina) Reinaldo Merlo	Resigned	May 6, 2014	(Argentina) Fabio Radaelli ^{7}	May 7, 2014	17th

Interim Managers
Torneo Inicial

1. (Argentina) Fabio Radaelli was interim manager in the 5th round.
2. Interim manager, but later promoted to full-time manager.
3. (Argentina) Ignacio Carlos González was interim manager in the 11th round.
4. Interim manager.

Torneo Final

5. Interim manager.
6. (Argentina) Roberto González was interim manager in the 14th round.
7. Interim manager.

== Torneo Inicial ==
The Torneo Inicial was the first tournament of the season. It began on August 2 and ended on December 15, 2013. Originally the tournament should finish on December 8, but AFA decided to postpone two matches of the last round (Vélez Sarsfield-San Lorenzo and Newell's Old Boys-Lanús) one week as Lanús had to play the 2013 Copa Sudamericana final against Ponte Preta of Brazil. San Lorenzo won the title with a 0–0 draw at Vélez Sarsfield as outgoing champions Newell's Old Boys were held 2–2 in Rosario. San Lorenzo topped the Torneo Inicial with 33 points from 19 matches, two more than Vélez Sarsfield, Newell's Old Boys and Lanús. It was San Lorenzo's 12th league title in the professional era and first since the 2007 Clausura championship.
Also in this tournament Colón were deducted six points after their denial to pay the fee that was agreed upon with Mexican side Atlante over Juan Carlos Falcón back in 2007. Atlante decided to take this issue to FIFA and they won the case. Colón lost the appeal and were forced to pay US$600.000.
Additionally, on November 18 (16th round) the Colón players refused to participate in the match against Atlético de Rafaela, due to a failure to pay the squad's wages. Finally, on December 10, AFA gave the victory to Atlético de Rafaela (0−1), but they did not deduct any points from Colón.

=== Standings ===
Pos	Team	Pld	W	D	L	GF	GA	GD	Pts	Qualification
1	San Lorenzo (C)	19	9	6	4	29	17	+12	33	2014 Copa Libertadores Second Stage
2	Lanús	19	8	7	4	32	18	+14	31	
3	Vélez Sarsfield	19	8	7	4	24	16	+8	31	
4	Newell's Old Boys	19	8	7	4	27	21	+6	31	
5	Arsenal	19	7	9	3	22	19	+3	30	
6	Belgrano	19	8	5	6	28	20	+8	29	
7	Boca Juniors	19	8	5	6	25	24	+1	29	
8	Atlético de Rafaela	19	8	5	6	25	25	0	29	
9	Estudiantes (LP)	19	6	9	4	16	14	+2	27	
10	Rosario Central	19	7	5	7	22	24	−2	26	
11	Gimnasia y Esgrima (LP)	19	6	8	5	21	24	−3	26	
12	Tigre	19	7	4	8	20	21	−1	25	
13	Argentinos Juniors	19	7	4	8	17	19	−2	25	
14	Godoy Cruz	19	6	6	7	17	17	0	24	
15	Olimpo	19	6	5	8	19	25	−6	23	
16	All Boys	19	5	7	7	19	19	0	22	
17	River Plate	19	5	6	8	12	14	−2	21	
18	Quilmes	19	5	6	8	14	23	−9	21	
19	Racing	19	4	4	11	12	24	−12	16	
20	Colón	19	3	3	13	8	25	−17	6 (Note: Colón deducted 6 points)	

Source: AFA
(C) Champions
Notes:

Primera División
2013 Torneo Inicial champion

15th title

=== Results ===
Home \ Away	ALL	ARJ	ARS	ATR	BEL	BOC	COL	EST	GLP	GCR	LAN	NOB	OLI	QUI	RAC	RIV	RCE	SLO	TIG	VEL
All Boys				1–1			0–0		2–1		2–3	3–1		4–0	1–0		1–1		0–0	1–1
Argentinos Juniors	1–0				1–3	0–0	2–0	1–0					4–0	1–1			1–2		1–0	
Arsenal	1–1	0–0			1–4	3–2		1–1	1–1	1–0			3–1			1–1		2–1		
Atlético de Rafaela		1–0	1–1					1–0	2–1	3–1	2–1	0–2	2–0			0–0		2–2		
Belgrano	1–0			3–2		1–2	2–0		1–2					0–1	3–0		0–1		2–0	3–0
Boca Juniors	0–2			2–1			2–0		1–1			2–3		2–0	2–0		1–1		2–1	2–1
Colón			0–1	0–1							0–3	2–2		1–0	1–1		2–1	0–2		0–2
Estudiantes (LP)	1–0				1–1	2–0	1–0		1–1					1–0	1–0		1–1		0–2	0–0
Gimnasia y Esgrima (LP)		0–0					1–0			0–0			2–2	3–2	1–3	1–0	3–1			2–1
Godoy Cruz	2–0	3–1			1–1	2–2	1–0	2–1					0–1			0–0			2–0	
Lanús		4–0	2–0		3–0	2–2		1–1	0–0	0–1			3–0			0–1		3–2		
Newell's Old Boys		2–0	1–1		0–0			1–1	3–0	1–1	2–2		2–1			1–0		1–1		
Olimpo	1–1				1–1	3–0	1–0	1–1						0–1	0–1		1–0		0–0	
Quilmes			0–1	1–1						1–0	0–0	0–2			1–1	1–1		3–2		1–1
Racing		0–1	0–2	0–1						2–0	1–1	0–1				1–0		0–3		0–1
River Plate	1–0	1–0			0–0	0–1	1–2	1–2					1–3				1–0		3–0	
Rosario Central			1–1	3–2						1–0	2–1	2–1		2–0	1–1			0–2		2–3
San Lorenzo	3–0	0–3			4–2	1–0		0–0	3–0	0–0			2–1			1–0			0–0	
Tigre			2–1	3–1			1–0		1–1		2–3	2–1		0–1	3–1		2–0			1–2
Vélez Sarsfield		2–0	0–0	4–1						2–1	0–0	3–0	1–2			0–0		0–0		

Source: Programación de Primera División Torneo Inicial 2013/2014
Legend: Blue = home team win; Yellow = draw; Red = away team win.

=== Top goalscorers ===
Rank	Name	Nationality	Club	Goals
1	César Pereyra	Argentine	Belgrano	10
2	Mauro Matos	Argentine	All Boys	9
3	Emanuel Gigliotti	Argentine	Boca Juniors	8
3	Ignacio Piatti	Argentine	San Lorenzo	8
3	Diego Vera	Uruguayan	Atlético de Rafaela	8
6	Lucas Pratto	Argentine	Vélez Sarsfield	7
6	Santiago Silva	Uruguayan	Lanús	7
8	Hernán Boyero	Argentine	Argentinos Juniors	6
8	Julio Furch	Argentine	Arsenal	6
8	Facundo Pereyra	Argentine	Gimnasia y Esgrima (LP)	6
8	Maxi Rodríguez	Argentine	Newell's Old Boys	6

=== Attendances ===
The Boca Juniors drew the highest average home attendance in the 2013-14 Torneo Inicial edition of the Argentine top-flight football league, followed by Rosario Central.

#	Football club	Home games	Average attendance
1	Boca Juniors	10	40,600
2	Rosario Central	9	38,889
3	Newell's Old Boys	10	37,800
4	River Plate	9	35,556
5	San Lorenzo de Almagro	10	28,500
6	Club Atlético Belgrano	10	21,200
7	Racing Club	9	19,778
8	Estudiantes de La Plata	10	16,900
9	GELP	9	14,889
10	Vélez Sarsfield	9	14,833
11	Club Atlético Colón	8	14,125
12	CA Lanús	10	11,450
13	Godoy Cruz	9	10,444
14	Quilmes AC	9	9,944
15	Club Olimpo	9	8,889
16	CA All Boys	10	7,750
17	Atlético Rafaela	10	7,400
18	Argentinos Juniors	9	6,667
19	CA Tigre	10	6,400
20	Arsenal de Sarandí	10	2,160

== Torneo Final ==
The Torneo Final was the second and final tournament of the season. It began on February 7 and ended on May 19, 2014. Colón was leader of the Torneo Final until the 11th round, then Estudiantes (LP), Gimnasia y Esgrima (LP) and River Plate started to fight for the lead of the tournament until the last round. In the last round River Plate trashed Quilmes 5-0 as Estudiantes (LP) and Gimnasia y Esgrima (LP) were beaten 2–1 by Tigre and 0–1 by Boca Juniors respectively. Finally River Plate won the Torneo Final with a five-point margin over Boca Juniors, Estudiantes (LP) and Godoy Cruz in joint second place. One of the fundamental moments in the title of River Plate was the victory 1–2 to Boca Juniors in the 10th round with a head goal of Ramiro Funes Mori in the last minutes of the match. This was their first away victory over Boca Juniors in 10 years.
With Argentinos Juniors and All Boys relegated previously, the third relegation place had a dramatic final in the last round after Colón and Atlético de Rafaela scored injury-time winners to win their games, at home to Olimpo and away to Arsenal respectively, forcing a play-off match between them.
At the end of the season Juan Sebastián Verón and Gabriel Heinze, captains of Estudiantes (LP) and Newell's Old Boys, finished their professional careers.

=== Standings ===
Pos	Team	Pld	W	D	L	GF	GA	GD	Pts	Qualification
1	River Plate (C)	19	11	4	4	28	15	+13	37	2015 Copa Libertadores Second Stage
2	Boca Juniors	19	9	5	5	25	15	+10	32	
3	Estudiantes (LP)	19	8	8	3	20	11	+9	32	
4	Godoy Cruz	19	9	5	5	23	18	+5	32	
5	Gimnasia y Esgrima (LP)	19	9	4	6	24	19	+5	31	
6	Vélez Sarsfield	19	9	3	7	34	26	+8	30	
7	Colón	19	8	6	5	14	13	+1	30	
8	Rosario Central	19	7	7	5	21	21	0	28	
9	Lanús	19	8	4	7	21	23	−2	28	
10	Olimpo	19	7	6	6	19	16	+3	27	
11	San Lorenzo	19	7	6	6	19	20	−1	27	
12	Newell's Old Boys	19	6	7	6	22	18	+4	25	
13	Tigre	19	5	9	5	14	14	0	24	
14	Quilmes	19	7	3	9	16	22	−6	24	
15	Belgrano	19	3	11	5	17	21	−4	20	
16	Atlético de Rafaela	19	4	8	7	22	28	−6	20	
17	Arsenal	19	5	3	11	19	28	−9	18	
18	Racing	19	4	5	10	19	24	−5	17	
19	Argentinos Juniors	19	3	6	10	9	21	−12	15	
20	All Boys	19	3	6	10	14	27	−13	15	

(C) Champions

Primera División
2014 Torneo Final champion

36th title

=== Results ===
Home \ Away	ALL	ARJ	ARS	ATR	BEL	BOC	COL	EST	GLP	GCR	LAN	NOB	OLI	QUI	RAC	RIV	RCE	SLO	TIG	VEL
All Boys		0–0	1–1		0–0	1–3		0–1		0–0			1–0			3–2		1–2		
Argentinos Juniors			2–0	0–0					0–2	2–1	0–2	0–0			0–1	0–2		0–2		2–1
Arsenal				1–2			1–0				3–1	3–2		0–2	3–1		1–1		0–1	1–3
Atlético de Rafaela	1–1				1–2	1–0	1–1							2–2	2–2		2–3		1–1	3–1
Belgrano		0–0	0–0					1–1		1–2	2–2	1–1	1–1			2–1		0–0		
Boca Juniors		1–1	4–2		2–3			1–0		3–0	3–1		2–0			1–2		0–0		
Colón	1–0	1–0			0–0	0–0		0–2	0–0	1–1			2–1			3–1			1–0	
Estudiantes (LP)		1–0	1–0	0–0						0–1	2–1	0–0	0–0			0–0		3–0		
Gimnasia y Esgrima (LP)	2–1		2–0	1–1	2–2	0–1		0–1			0–0	3–0						2–1	3–1	
Godoy Cruz			2–1	3–0					0–2		1–0	0–1		2–0	2–1		3–0	1–1		1–1
Lanús	1–0			0–3			1–0					1–1		1–0	1–0		2–1		0–0	3–2
Newell's Old Boys	4–2			4–1		0–0	0–1							1–1	2–0		0–1		2–1	4–1
Olimpo		3–0	0–2	2–1					0–2	3–1	2–0	1–0				1–1		2–0		1–2
Quilmes	1–2	1–0			1–0	0–0	0–2	1–3	2–0				0–1				0–1		1–0	
Racing	1–1				2–0	1–2	3–0	3–3	0–1				1–1	0–1			0–0		0–1	
River Plate			1–0	2–0					1–0	1–2	2–0	1–0		5–0	3–2			1–0		1–0
Rosario Central	2–0	3–2			0–0	2–1	0–1	0–0	3–1				0–0			1–1			1–1	
San Lorenzo			2–0	2–0			0–0				1–4	0–0		1–0	1–0		2–1			2–3
Tigre	2–0	0–0			2–1	0–1		2–1		0–0			0–0			0–0		2–2		
Vélez Sarsfield	3–0				3–1	1–0	2–0	1–1	5–1					1–3	0–1		4–1		0–0	

Source: Programación de Primera División Torneo Final 2013/2014
Legend: Blue = home team win; Yellow = draw; Red = away team win.

=== Top goalscorers ===
Rank	Name	Nationality	Club	Goals
1	Mauro Zárate	Argentine	Vélez Sarsfield	13
2	Guido Carrillo	Argentine	Estudiantes (LP)	9
3	Fernando Cavenaghi	Argentine	River Plate	8
3	Emanuel Gigliotti	Argentine	Boca Juniors	8
5	José Adolfo Valencia	Colombian	Olimpo	7
6	Lucas Albertengo	Argentine	Atlético de Rafaela	6
6	Carlos Carbonero	Colombian	River Plate	6
6	Mariano Echeverría	Argentine	Arsenal	6
6	Teófilo Gutiérrez	Colombian	River Plate	6
10	Gabriel Graciani	Argentine	Colón	5
10	Lucas Pratto	Argentine	Vélez Sarsfield	5
10	Juan Román Riquelme	Argentine	Boca Juniors	5
10	Diego Vera	Uruguayan	Atlético de Rafaela	5

=== Attendances ===
River Plate drew the highest average home attendance in the 2013-14 Torneo Final edition of the Argentine top-flight football league, followed by Rosario Central.

#	Football club	Home games	Average attendance
1	River Plate	10	48,500
2	Rosario Central	10	37,900
3	Newell's Old Boys	9	36,444
4	Boca Juniors	9	34,889
5	Club Atlético Belgrano	9	32,444
6	Racing Club	10	24,700
7	Estudiantes de La Plata	9	24,111
8	Club Atlético Colón	10	24,000
9	San Lorenzo de Almagro	9	21,000
10	GELP	10	15,300
11	Vélez Sarsfield	10	11,950
12	Godoy Cruz	10	11,250
13	CA Tigre	9	10,333
14	Club Olimpo	10	8,700
15	CA All Boys	9	8,056
16	Argentinos Juniors	10	8,000
17	Quilmes AC	10	7,700
18	CA Lanús	9	7,667
19	Atlético Rafaela	9	7,056
20	Arsenal de Sarandí	9	2,211

== Superfinal ==
The 2013-14 Superfinal was played between San Lorenzo, winners of the 2013 Torneo Inicial, and River Plate, winners of the 2014 Torneo Final. River Plate did not count on defender Éder Álvarez Balanta nor striker Teófilo Gutiérrez, as both players were called up by José Néstor Pekerman for the Colombia national team to train for the 2014 World Cup. San Lorenzo did not count on defender Carlos Valdés, who also was training with the Colombia national team, and Ignacio Piatti, who was recovering from an injury. River Plate defeated San Lorenzo 1–0 and as Super Champions they qualified to 2014 Copa Sudamericana and 2014 Supercopa Argentina. The only goal came from Germán Pezzella in the 73rd minute, a header after a free-kick from the left.

=== Details ===
2013–14 Primera División Superfinal
24 May 2014
21:15 UTC−3

San Lorenzo	0–1	River Plate
	Report	Pezzella 73'

Provincial Juan Gilberto Funes, La Punta, San Luis
Referee: Néstor Pitana

San Lorenzo
River Plate

GK	12	(Argentina) Sebastián Torrico
DF	7	(Argentina) Julio Buffarini	(yellow card) 81'
DF	29	(Argentina) Fabricio Fontanini	(yellow card) 72'
DF	6	(Argentina) Santiago Gentiletti	(yellow card) 24'
DF	21	(Argentina) Emmanuel Más		(substituted off) 76'
MF	15	(Argentina) Héctor Villalba
MF	5	(Argentina) Juan Mercier		(substituted off) 80'
MF	20	(Paraguay) Néstor Ortigoza
MF	10	(Argentina) Leandro Romagnoli (c)		(substituted off) 64'
FW	11	(Argentina) Ángel Correa
FW	26	(Argentina) Mauro Matos
Substitutes:
GK	1	(Argentina) Cristian Álvarez
DF	14	(Argentina) Walter Kannemann
DF	4	(Argentina) Gonzalo Prósperi
MF	8	(Argentina) Enzo Kalinski
MF	19	(Argentina) Leandro Navarro		(substituted on) 80'
MF	24	(Argentina) Juan Cavallaro		(substituted on) 64'
FW	9	(Uruguay) Martín Cauteruccio		(substituted on) 76'
Manager:
(Argentina) Edgardo Bauza

GK	1	(Argentina) Marcelo Barovero
DF	25	(Argentina) Gabriel Mercado	(yellow card) 80'
DF	2	(Argentina) Jonathan Maidana		(substituted off) 22'
DF	6	(Argentina) Ramiro Funes Mori	(yellow card) 18'
DF	21	(Argentina) Leonel Vangioni
MF	7	(Colombia) Carlos Carbonero
MF	28	(Argentina) Cristian Ledesma
MF	16	(Argentina) Ariel Rojas
MF	10	(Argentina) Manuel Lanzini
FW	30	(Argentina) Daniel Villalva	(yellow card) 54'	(substituted off) 85'
FW	9	(Argentina) Fernando Cavenaghi (c)		(substituted off) 46'
Substitutes:
GK	19	(Argentina) Leandro Chichizola
DF	20	(Argentina) Germán Pezzella	(yellow card) 77'	(substituted on) 22'
MF	5	(Argentina) Matías Kranevitter		(substituted on) 85'
MF	11	(Argentina) Osmar Ferreyra
MF	18	(Argentina) Augusto Solari
FW	8	(Argentina) Juan Carlos Menseguez
FW	35	(Argentina) Giovanni Simeone		(substituted on) 46'
Manager:
(Argentina) Ramón Díaz

Assistant referees:
Hernán Maidana
Juan Belatti
Fourth official:
Mauro Vigliano

Match rules

- 90 minutes.
- 30 minutes of extra time if necessary.
- Penalty shoot-out if scores still level.
- Seven named substitutes.
- Maximum of three substitutions.

- Buffarini (San Lorenzo) and Barovero (River Plate) finished the match as captains.

== Relegation ==
The relegation (or average) table is the table that averages the points over the last 3 seasons (each season consisting of two tournaments, "Inicial" and "Final"). Teams that have recently been promoted will only have one or two seasons counted under this table (and therefore fewer games played), thus each point they score increases their average more than the teams that have 3 seasons played.

Pos	Team	2011–12 Pts	2012–13 Pts	2013–14 Pts	Total Pts	Total Pld	Avg	Relegation
1	Boca Juniors	76	51	61	188	114	1.649	
2	Vélez Sarsfield	64	61	61	186	114	1.632	
3	River Plate	—	64	58	122	76	1.605	
4	Lanús	55	67	59	181	114	1.588	
5	Newell's Old Boys	48	74	56	178	114	1.561	
6	Gimnasia y Esgrima (LP)	—	—	57	57	38	1.5	
7	Arsenal	62	60	48	170	114	1.491	
8	Belgrano	55	59	49	163	114	1.43	
9	Rosario Central	—	—	54	54	38	1.421	
10	San Lorenzo	44	58	60	162	114	1.421	
11	Estudiantes (LP)	50	48	59	157	114	1.377	
12	Olimpo	—	—	50	50	38	1.316	
13	Tigre	63	34	49	146	114	1.281	
14	Racing	50	62	33	145	114	1.272	
15	Godoy Cruz	38	49	56	143	114	1.254	
16	Quilmes	—	50	45	95	76	1.25	
17	Atlético de Rafaela (O)	50	43	49	142	114	1.246	
18	Colón (R)	60	46	36^{†}	142	114	1.246	Primera B Nacional
19	All Boys (R)	54	41	37	132	114	1.158	Primera B Nacional
20	Argentinos Juniors (R)	49	37	40	126	114	1.105	Primera B Nacional

^{†}Colón deducted 6 points.

=== Relegation playoff ===
After three seasons, Colón and Atlético de Rafaela finished with the same average (142 points in 114 matches, average 1.246). The tournament rules established that if two teams, at the end of the season, had the same average it was required a playoff game. Atlético de Rafaela won the match 0–1 and remained in the Primera División. In the other hand, after 19 seasons playing in the Primera División, Colón was relegated to the Primera B Nacional championship.

24 May 2014
14:00 (UTC−3)

Colón	0–1	Atlético de Rafaela
	Report	Depetris 56'

Estadio Gigante de Arroyito, Rosario
Referee: Diego Abal

== International qualification ==
Qualification for the 2014 Copa Sudamericana tournament was awarded to the winners of the 2013–14 Argentine Primera División and the 5 best teams of this aggregate table (if not qualified for 2014 Copa Libertadores second stage, or won the 2014 Torneo Final or were the aggregate table best team not yet qualified for the 2015 Copa Libertadores, or relegated).

Qualification for the 2015 Copa Libertadores tournament was awarded to the 2014 Torneo Final champion and the aggregate table best team not yet qualified. This aggregate table could also be used for award places for the 2015 Copa Libertadores if the 2014 Torneo de Transición champion is qualified and could be used as tiebreak for the 2013–14 Copa Argentina and the 2014 Copa Sudamericana best Argentine team berths.

At the end of the season Vélez Sarsfield and Boca Juniors tied the aggregate table best team with 61 points. Therefore, a playoff match between them was played on January 28, 2015. Boca Juniors won 1–0 and qualified to the 2015 Copa Libertadores Second Stage.

Pos	Team	Pld	W	D	L	GF	GA	GD	Pts	Qualification
1	Vélez Sarsfield	38	17	10	11	58	42	+16	61	
2	Boca Juniors	38	17	10	11	50	39	+11	61	2014 Copa Sudamericana Second Stage and 2015 Copa Libertadores Second Stage
3	San Lorenzo	38	16	12	10	48	37	+11	60	
4	Lanús	38	16	11	11	53	41	+12	59	2014 Copa Sudamericana Round of 16 (Note: Lanús was qualified for the 2014 Copa Sudamericana as the 2013 Copa Sudamericana champion.)
5	Estudiantes (LP)	38	14	17	7	36	25	+11	59	2014 Copa Sudamericana Second Stage
6	River Plate	38	16	10	12	40	29	+11	58	2014 Copa Sudamericana Second Stage and 2015 Copa Libertadores Second Stage (Note: River Plate was qualified for the 2014 Copa Sudamericana as 2013-14 Super Champions and the 2015 Copa Libertadores as the 2014 Torneo Final champion.)
7	Gimnasia y Esgrima (LP)	38	15	12	11	45	43	+2	57	2014 Copa Sudamericana Second Stage
8	Newell's Old Boys	38	14	14	10	49	39	+10	56	
9	Godoy Cruz	38	15	11	12	40	35	+5	56	2014 Copa Sudamericana Second Stage
10	Rosario Central	38	14	12	12	43	45	−2	54	2014 Copa Sudamericana Second Stage
11	Olimpo	38	13	11	14	38	41	−3	50	
12	Belgrano	38	11	16	11	45	41	+4	49	
13	Tigre	38	12	13	13	34	35	−1	49	
14	Atlético de Rafaela	38	12	13	13	47	53	−6	49	
15	Arsenal	38	12	12	14	41	47	−6	48	
16	Quilmes	38	12	9	17	30	45	−15	45	
17	Argentinos Juniors	38	10	10	18	26	40	−14	40	
18	All Boys	38	8	13	17	33	46	−13	37	
19	Colón	38	11	9	18	22	38	−16	36 (Note: Colón deducted 6 points.)	
20	Racing	38	8	9	21	31	48	−17	33	

=== Copa Libertadores playoff ===
2015 Copa Libertadores qualification
January 28, 2015
22:15 (UTC−3)

Boca Juniors	1–0	Vélez Sarsfield
Colazo 34'	Report (1); Report (2)

Estadio José María Minella, Mar del Plata
Referee: Germán Delfino

Boca Juniors
Vélez Sarsfield

GK	1	(Argentina) Agustín Orión	Yellow card
DF	15	(Argentina) Leandro Marín
DF	24	(Argentina) Guillermo Burdisso
DF	2	(Argentina) Daniel Díaz
DF	18	(Argentina) Nicolás Colazo
MF	17	(Argentina) César Meli
MF	21	(Argentina) Cristian Erbes
MF	5	(Argentina) Fernando Gago	Yellow card
MF	7	(Argentina) Juan Manuel Martínez	(substituted off) 66'
FW	27	(Argentina) Jonathan Calleri
FW	11	(Argentina) Federico Carrizo	(substituted off) 81'
Substitutions:
FW	25	(Argentina) Andrés Chávez	(substituted on) 66' (red card) 80'
MF	8	(Argentina) Pablo Pérez	(substituted on) 81'
GK		(Argentina) Guillermo Sara
DF		(Argentina) Luciano Monzón
DF		(Argentina) Claudio Pérez
MF		(Argentina) Andrés Cubas
FW		(Argentina) Emmanuel Gigliotti
Manager:
(Argentina) Rodolfo Arruabarrena

GK	13	(Uruguay) Sebastián Sosa
DF	5	(Argentina) Fabián Cubero
DF		(Argentina) Hernán Pellerano
DF	6	(Argentina) Sebastián Domínguez
DF	21	(Argentina) Lautaro Grillo	(yellow card) (red card)
MF	7	(Argentina) Yamil Asad	(substituted off) 78'
MF		(Argentina) Lucas Romero	(substituted off) 64'
MF	18	(Argentina) Leandro Somoza	Red card
MF		(Argentina) Alejandro Cabral	(substituted off) 64'
FW	8	(Argentina) Mariano Pavone
FW		(Argentina) Milton Caraglio
Substitutions:
DF		(Argentina) Leandro Desábato	(substituted on) 64'
FW		(Argentina) Leonardo Villalba	(substituted on) 64'
FW		(Argentina) Ramiro Cáseres	(substituted on) 78'
GK		(Argentina) Alan Aguerre
DF		(Argentina) Emiliano Amor
DF		(Argentina) Matías Pérez Acuña
FW		(Argentina) Roberto Nanni
Manager:
(Argentina) Miguel Ángel Russo

Boca Juniors qualified for 2015 Copa Libertadores second stage as Argentina 4.
