= Claudio Pérez =

Argentine footballer

Claudio Daniel Pérez
Personal information
- Full name: Claudio Daniel Pérez
- Date of birth: December 26, 1985 (age 40)
- Place of birth: José C. Paz, Argentina
- Height: 1.84 m (6 ft 0 in)
- Position: Centre back

Youth career
- Flandria

Senior career*
Years	Team	Apps	(Gls)
2004–2007	Flandria	47	(3)
2007–2008	Atlanta	14	(1)
2008–2009	Tiro Federal	29	(1)
2009	Deportes La Serena	15	(0)
2010	Tigre	28	(3)
2011–2012	Belgrano	70	(9)
2013–2015	Boca Juniors	31	(1)
2015	→ Belgrano (loan)	26	(3)
2016	Banfield	16	(0)
2017	Puebla	7	(0)
2017–2018	Flandria	10	(0)
2018	IFK Värnamo	12	(0)
2019	San Carlos	17	(0)
2021	Cibao		
2022	Juventud Antoniana	4	(0)
2022–2023	Camioneros Córdoba	5	(0)
2023	Atlas	3	(0)
- * Club domestic league appearances and goals

Claudio Daniel Pérez (born 26 December 1985), nicknamed "Chiqui", is an Argentine former football defender.

== Career ==
He started his career in Flandria as a central midfielder for then joining other teams from Buenos Aires.

In 2009, he played for Chilean club Deportes La Serena in the Primera División de Chile.

In 2011, he was signed by Belgrano in which he was part of a historical Ascent to Primera División after beating River Plate in two promotional games end in mid-2011.

In January 2013, he was acquired by Boca Juniors.

On 24 July 2018, Pérez joined IFK Värnamo in Superettan, Sweden's second tier. He left Sweden again at the end of the year, and signed with AD San Carlos in January 2019.
