= 2015 Club Atlético Boca Juniors season =

Boca Juniors
2015 season
- President: Daniel Angelici
- Manager: (Argentina) Rodolfo Arruabarrena
- Stadium: Estadio Alberto J. Armando (La Bombonera)
- Primera División: 1st
- Copa Argentina: Winners
- Copa Libertadores: Round of 16
- Top goalscorer: League: Jonathan Calleri (10); All: Jonathan Calleri (15)
Home colours	Away colours	Third colours

The 2015 Club Atlético Boca Juniors season was the 86th consecutive Primera División season. During the season Boca Juniors took part in the Primera División, Copa Argentina and Copa Libertadores.

== Season overview ==
=== December ===
- December 5: ▼ Mariano Echeverría finished his contract with Boca.
- December 10: ▼ Leonardo Suárez signed for Villarreal from Boca for €2 million.
- December 29: ▼ Roma exercised an option to purchase Leandro Paredes outright for €4.5 million.

▲ Pablo Pérez signed for Boca from Málaga on an 18-month loan for €200,000.

- December 31: ▼ Hernán Grana finished the loan with Boca and returned to All Boys.

▼ Pablo Ledesma finished his contract with Boca.

=== January ===
- January 3: ▲ Guillermo Sara signed for Boca as a free agent, for €500,000. The last team of the goalkeeper was Real Betis.
- January 4: ▼ Nahuel Zárate signed for Godoy Cruz on a one-year loan.

▲ Cristian Pavón returned from Colón after a loan spell.

- January 5:▼ Juan Forlín returned to Al Rayyan after a loan spell.

A new third uniform was presented.

- January 10:▼ Joel Acosta signed for Olimpo on a one-year loan.
- January 11: ▼ Emanuel Insúa signed for Udinese from Boca for €2,532,800.
- January 14: On the first friendly of the season, Boca played against Ferrocarril Sud, winning 3–0.
- January 16: ▲ Alexis Rolín signed for Boca from Málaga on an 18-month loan .
- January 17: ▼ Manuel Vicentini signed for Sarmiento on a one-year loan.

On the first match of Copa Ciudad de Mar del Plata, Boca played against Racing Club, it was a 1–4 defeat, with great problems in defense and two players sent off (Erbes and Marín).

- January 18: ▲ Marco Torsiglieri signed for Boca from Metalist Kharkiv on a one-year loan.
- January 20:On the second match of Copa Ciudad de Mar del Plata, Boca played against Vélez Sarsfield, it was a 2–2 draw.
- January 21: ▼ Sebastián D'Angelo signed for Tigre from Boca.

Boca draw another friendly, this time 0–0 against Emelec from Ecuador.

- January 22: ▲▼ Gino Peruzzi signed for Boca from Catania for €3.5 million and the complete purchase of Gonzalo Escalante.

▲ Fabián Monzón signed for Boca from Catania on a one-year loan.

- January 24: ▼ Luciano Acosta signed for Estudiantes de La Plata on a one-year loan.

On the first friendly Superclasico, on the Copa Julio Humberto Grondona Boca defeated River Plate 1–0 with Franco Cristaldo scoring the goal, the match ended with 3 players sent off: Cubas from Boca and Vangioni and Maidana from River.

- January 25:Cristian Pavón suffered the fracture of the Fifth metatarsal bone after a tackle from Leonel Vangioni. Pavón will be out two months.
- January 26:▲ After the injury of Pavón it was decided that Sebastián Palacios would return to Boca after being loaned to Arsenal de Sarandí.
- January 28:Boca played against Vélez Sarsfield the most important match of the pre-season: the playoff to qualify to the 2015 Copa Libertadores. It was a 1–0 win, with Nicolás Colazo scoring a great goal. Boca will play in the Group 5 against Zamora, Montevideo Wanderers and a qualified team from First Stage (winner G5).
- January 31:On the second friendly Superclasico, on the Copa Luis B. Nofal, Boca defeated River with an historic result: it was a 5–0 win, with Franco Cristaldo, Sebastián Palacios, Andrés Chávez, Jonathan Calleri and Rodrigo Betancur scoring. River had a bad night and Mayada, Gutiérrez and Sánchez were sent off.

=== February ===
- February 4: ▼ Claudio Pérez signed for Belgrano on a one-year loan.
- February 5: ▲ Nicolás Lodeiro signed for Boca from Corinthians for €2,479,480.

Boca played two friendlies against Barracas Central, winning both: 2–1 and 1–0.

- February 10:The draw of Copa Argentina took place and Boca willa have to play against Huracán Las Heras from the Torneo Federal B.

Alexis Rolín suffered the Strain of his right Quadriceps. He will be out one month.

- February 11: ▲ Daniel Osvaldo signed for Boca from Southampton F.C. on a 6-month loan.
- February 15: On the Round 1 of Primera División, Boca played against Olimpo. On the first match of the tournament Boca won 3–1 with Fernando Gago and Sebastián Palacios scoring the goals.
- February 18: In their first Copa Libertadores match, Boca won 2–0 in Chile against Palestino.
- February 22: On the Round 2 of Primera División, Boca played against Temperley. It was a 2–0 victory in a match where Agustín Orión was sent off in the end of the first half.
- February 26: In their second Copa Libertadores group stage match, Boca won 2–1 against Montevideo Wanderers.
- February 27: ▼ Emanuel Gigliotti signed for Chongqing Lifan on a 6-month loan for €669,051.

=== March ===
- March 1: On the Round 3 of Primera División, Boca played against Atlético de Rafaela, winning 1–0 with Jonathan Calleri scoring the only goal.
- March 8: On the Round 4 of Primera División, Boca played against Colón, and the game ended 1–1.
- March 11: In their third Copa Libertadores group stage match, Boca won 5–0 against Zamora in a great match of the team.
- March 14: On the Round 5 of Primera División, Boca played against Defensa y Justicia, winning 2–1. Fernando Gago and Sebastián Palacios suffered the strain on his right and left leg, respectively.
- March 17: In their fourth Copa Libertadores group stage match, Boca won 5–1 against Zamora in Venezuela.
- March 22: On the Round 6 of Primera División, Boca played against San Martín (SJ), and the game ended 1–1.
- March 29: On the Round 7 of Primera División, Boca played against Estudiantes (LP), playing a great match and winning 3–0.

=== April ===
- April 5: On the Round 8 of Primera División, Boca played against Huracán, winning 2–0 with César Meli scoring twice.
- April 9: In their fifth Copa Libertadores group stage match, Boca won 3–0 against Montevideo Wanderers in Uruguay. Cristian Erbes suffered the sprain of his left knee.
- April 12: On the Round 9 of Primera División, Boca played against Nueva Chicago, the match ended 0–0.
- April 16: In their last Copa Libertadores group stage match, Boca won 2–0 against Palestino. For the first time Boca won the 6 matches of the group and obtained the record of being the best team in a group stage of the history of Copa Libertadores.
- April 19: On the Round 10 of Primera División, Boca played against Lanús, winning 3–1.

=== May ===
- 3 May: On the Round 11 of Primera División, Boca played against River Plate, the Superclásico winning 2–0.
- 7 May: In the first leg of Round of 16 of Copa Libertadores Boca was defeated by River Plate 1–0, the first defeat on the year.
- 11 May: On the Round 12 of Primera División, Boca played against Independiente, the match ended in a 1–1 draw.
- 14 May: On the second leg of Round of 16 of Copa Libertadores the game was suspended after River Plate players were attacked with tear gas by Boca Juniors fans when the squad returned to the field following halftime, with the match still 0–0 (River Plate leading 1–0 on aggregate).
- 24 May: On the Round 13 of Primera División, Boca played against Aldosivi, suffering a 0–3 defeat.
- 27 May: In the Round of 64 game of the Copa Argentina, Boca played against Huracán Las Heras, winning 2–0.
- 31 May: On the Round 14 of Primera División, Boca played against Vélez Sarsfield, suffering a 2–0 defeat.

=== June ===
- June 7: On the Round 15 of Primera División, Boca played against Newell's Old Boys, winning 4–0. The tournament will continue in July, after a winter break.
- June 19: ▼ Emanuel Trípodi finished his contract with Boca.
- June 25: ▼ Guillermo Burdisso finished his contract with Boca and signed with Club León of Mexico.
- June 27: On the first winter friendly in United States Boca played against Jacksonville Armada FC winning 4–2. Arruabarrena confirmed that Torsiglieri will not continue in Boca.
- June 30: ▼ Marco Torsiglieri finished the loan with Boca and returned to Metalist.

▼ Daniel Osvaldo finished the loan with Boca and returned to Southampton F.C.

=== July ===
- July 1: On the second winter friendly in United States Boca played against Fort Lauderdale Strikers winning 3–0.
- July 4: On the third and last winter friendly, Boca played against Deportivo Saprissa of Costa Rica, winning 1–0.
- July 10: ▲ Fernando Tobio signed for Boca from Palmeiras on a one-year loan.
- July 12: On the Round 16 of Primera División, after a winter break, Boca played against Sarmiento, winning 1–0.
- July 13:▲▼ Carlos Tevez signed for Boca from Juventus FC for €0 and a two-year loan of Guido Vadalá.
- July 15:▼ Gonzalo Castellani signed for Lanús on a loan until the end of the season.
- July 17:▼ Juan Manuel Martínez cancelled his contract with Boca, after playing two years in the club.
- July 18: On the Round 17 of Primera División, Boca played against Quilmes, winning 2–1 with a great goal of Jonathan Calleri who performed a rabona.
- July 25:▼ Chongqing Lifan used the purchase option on Emanuel Gigliotti, who was on a 6-month loan, after playing two years in the club.
- July 26: On the Round 18 of Primera División, Boca played against Belgrano, winning 1–0.
- July 29: In the Round of 32 game of the Copa Argentina, Boca played against Banfield, winning 3–0.

=== August ===
- August 2: On the Round 19 of Primera División, Boca played against Unión, losing 3–4 in an incredible match.
- August 5:▼ Federico Carrizo signed for Cruz Azul on a loan until the end of the season.
- August 16: On the Round 20 of Primera División, Boca played against Arsenal, winning 2–1 in Sarandí.
- August 19: In the Round of 16 game of the Copa Argentina, Boca played against Guaraní Antonio Franco, winning 4–0.
- August 23: On the Round 21 of Primera División, Boca played against Godoy Cruz, winning 2–0.
- August 29: On the Round 22 of Primera División, Boca played against Gimnasia y Esgrima (LP), winning 2–1 in La Plata.

=== September ===
- September 1:▲ Boca made use of the option to purchase Pablo Pérez permanently for €1,000,000 until 2019.
- September 6: On the Round 23 of Primera División, Boca played against San Lorenzo, losing 1–0.
- September 13: On the Round 24 of Primera División, Boca played against River Plate, the Superclásico winning 1–0.
- September 19: On the Round 25 of Primera División, Boca played against Argentinos Juniors, winning 3–1 in La Paternal.
- September 23: In the Quarterfinals game of the Copa Argentina, Boca played against Defensa y Justicia, winning 2–1.
- September 27: On the Round 26 of Primera División, Boca played against Banfield, winning 3–0.

=== October ===
- October 4: On the Round 27 of Primera División, Boca played against Crucero del Norte, winning 1–0.
- October 10:On the last friendly Superclasico, River Plate defeated Boca 1–0 with Lucho González scoring the goal, the match was played in Córdoba.
- October 19: On the Round 28 of Primera División, Boca played against Racing, losing 3–1.
- October 23: In the Semifinals game of the Copa Argentina, Boca played against Lanús, winning 2–0 and advancing to the final.

=== November ===
- November 1: On the Round 29 of Primera División, Boca clinched their 31st Argentine Primera División title after winning 1–0 against Tigre.
- November 4: In the Final of the Copa Argentina, Boca played against Rosario Central, winning 2–0, Boca clinched their 3rd Copa Argentina title.
- November 8: On the Round 30 of Primera División, the last round of the tournament, Boca played against Rosario Central in Rosario losing 3–1.

== Squad ==
Last updated on November 8, 2015

Squad No.	Name	Nationality	Position	Date of Birth (Age)	Apps	Goals	Signed from	Note
Goalkeepers
1	Agustín Orión (VC 4º)	(Argentina)	GK	26 June 1981 (age 45)	178	−141	(Argentina) Estudiantes (LP)	
31	Guillermo Sara	(Argentina)	GK	30 September 1987 (age 39)	13	−12	(Spain) Real Betis	
–	Bruno Galván	(Argentina)	GK	8 May 1994 (age 32)	0	0	(Argentina) The academy	
Defenders
2	Daniel Díaz (C)	(Argentina)	DF	13 July 1979 (age 47)	176	13	(Spain) Atlético Madrid	
3	Luciano Fabián Monzón	(Argentina)	DF	13 April 1987 (age 39)	89	4	(Italy) Catania	
4	Gino Peruzzi	(Argentina)	DF	9 June 1992 (age 34)	28	1	(Italy) Catania	
6	Fernando Tobio	(Argentina)	DF	18 October 1989 (age 36)	17	0	(Brazil) Palmeiras	
13	Alexis Rolín	(Uruguay)	DF	7 February 1989 (age 37)	11	0	(Italy) Catania	
15	Leandro Marín	(Argentina)	DF	22 January 1992 (age 34)	61	3	(Argentina) The academy	
22	Lisandro Magallán	(Argentina)	DF	27 September 1993 (age 33)	23	1	(Argentina) Rosario Central	
33	Juan Cruz Komar	(Argentina)	DF	13 August 1996 (age 30)	5	1	(Argentina) The academy	
Midfielders
5	Fernando Gago (VC 3º)	(Argentina)	MF	10 April 1986 (age 40)	142	5	(Spain) Valencia	Injured
8	Pablo Pérez	(Argentina)	MF	10 August 1985 (age 41)	26	3	(Spain) Málaga	
14	Nicolás Lodeiro	(Uruguay)	MF	21 March 1989 (age 37)	31	6	(Brazil) Corinthians	
17	César Meli	(Argentina)	MF	20 June 1992 (age 34)	50	5	(Argentina) Colón	
18	Nicolás Colazo	(Argentina)	MF	8 July 1990 (age 36)	121	9	(Argentina) All Boys	
19	Federico Bravo	(Argentina)	MF	5 October 1993 (age 33)	37	0	(Argentina) The academy	
20	Adrián Cubas	(Argentina)	MF	22 May 1996 (age 30)	26	1	(Argentina) The academy	
21	Cristian Erbes (VC 5º)	(Argentina)	MF	6 January 1990 (age 36)	151	5	(Argentina) The academy	
26	José Pedro Fuenzalida	(Chile)	MF	22 February 1985 (age 41)	36	1	(Chile) Colo-Colo	
28	Tomás Pochettino	(Argentina)	MF	1 February 1996 (age 30)	1	0	(Argentina) The academy	
30	Rodrigo Bentancur	(Uruguay)	MF	5 June 1997 (age 29)	24	0	(Argentina) The academy	
32	Franco Cristaldo	(Argentina)	MF	15 August 1996 (age 30)	14	1	(Argentina) The academy	
Forwards
7	Cristian Pavón	(Argentina)	FW	21 January 1996 (age 30)	9	2	(Argentina) Colón	
10	Carlos Tevez (VC 2º)	(Argentina)	FW	5 February 1984 (age 42)	127	47	(Italy) Juventus	
25	Andrés Chávez	(Argentina)	FW	21 March 1991 (age 35)	42	14	(Argentina) Banfield	
27	Jonathan Calleri	(Argentina)	FW	23 September 1993 (age 33)	61	24	(Argentina) All Boys	
34	Sebastián Palacios	(Argentina)	FW	20 January 1992 (age 34)	30	6	(Argentina) Arsenal	

== Transfers ==
Players transferred in
Date	Pos.	Name	Club	Fee
January 3, 2015	GK	(Argentina) Guillermo Sara	Free Agent	€500,000
January 22, 2015	DF	(Argentina) Gino Peruzzi	(Italy) Catania	€3,500,000
February 5, 2015	MF	(Uruguay) Nicolás Lodeiro	(Brazil) Corinthians	€2,479,480
July 13, 2015	FW	(Argentina) Carlos Tevez	(Italy) Juventus	€0
September 1, 2015	MF	(Argentina) Pablo Pérez	(Spain) Málaga CF	€1,000,000
Players transferred out
Date	Pos.	Name	Club	Fee
December 10, 2014	MF	(Argentina) Leonardo Suárez	(Spain) Villarreal CF	€2,000,000
December 29, 2014	MF	(Argentina) Leandro Paredes	(Italy) AS Roma	€4,500,000
January 11, 2015	DF	(Argentina) Emanuel Insúa	(Italy) Udinese	€2,532,800
January 22, 2015	MF	(Argentina) Gonzalo Escalante	(Italy) Catania	Undisclosed
June 26, 2015	FW	(Argentina) Sergio Araujo	(Spain) UD Las Palmas	€2,500,000
July 25, 2015	FW	(Argentina) Emanuel Gigliotti	(China) Chongqing Lifan	€2,729,750
Players loaned in
Start date	Pos.	Name	Club	End date
December 29, 2014	MF	(Argentina) Pablo Pérez	(Spain) Málaga CF	July 2016
January 16, 2015	DF	(Uruguay) Alexis Rolín	(Italy) Catania	July 2016
January 18, 2015	DF	(Argentina) Marco Torsiglieri	(Ukraine) Metalist	June 2015
January 22, 2015	DF	(Argentina) Luciano Fabián Monzón	(Italy) Catania	End of Season
February 11, 2015	FW	(Italy) Daniel Osvaldo	(England) Southampton	June 2015
July 10, 2015	DF	(Argentina) Fernando Tobio	(Brazil) Palmeiras	July 2016
Players loaned out
Start date	Pos.	Name	Club	End date
January 4, 2015	DF	(Argentina) Nahuel Zárate	(Argentina) Godoy Cruz	End of season
January 10, 2015	FW	(Argentina) Joel Acosta	(Argentina) Olimpo	End of season
January 17, 2015	GK	(Argentina) Manuel Vicentini	(Argentina) Sarmiento	End of season
January 24, 2015	MF	(Argentina) Luciano Acosta	(Argentina) Estudiantes	End of season
February 4, 2015	DF	(Argentina) Claudio Pérez	(Argentina) Belgrano	End of season
February 27, 2015	FW	(Argentina) Emanuel Gigliotti	(China) Chongqing Lifan	July 2015
June 27, 2015	FW	(Argentina) Guido Vadalá	(Italy) Juventus	July 2017
July 15, 2015	MF	(Argentina) Gonzalo Castellani	(Argentina) Lanús	End of season
August 5, 2015	MF	(Argentina) Federico Carrizo	(Mexico) Cruz Azul	End of season
Players released
Date	Pos.	Name	Subsequent club	Join date
December 5, 2014	DF	(Argentina) Mariano Echeverría	(Argentina) Tigre	January 5, 2015
December 31, 2014	DF	(Argentina) Pablo Ledesma	(Argentina) Cólon	January 24, 2015
January 21, 2015	GK	(Argentina) Sebastián D'Angelo	(Argentina) Tigre	January 21, 2015
June 19, 2015	GK	(Argentina) Emanuel Trípodi	Free Agent	–
June 25, 2015	DF	(Argentina) Guillermo Burdisso	(Mexico) León	June 25, 2015
July 17, 2015	FW	(Argentina) Juan Manuel Martínez	(United States) Real Salt Lake	August 13, 2015
Loan Return
Date	Pos.	Name	Return to	Return from
December 4, 2014	FW	(Argentina) Cristian Pavón	(Argentina) Boca Juniors	(Argentina) Cólon
January 26, 2015	FW	(Argentina) Sebastián Palacios	(Argentina) Boca Juniors	(Argentina) Arsenal
December 31, 2014	DF	(Argentina) Hernán Grana	(Argentina) All Boys	(Argentina) Boca Juniors
January 5, 2015	DF	(Argentina) Juan Forlín	(Qatar) Al Rayyan	(Argentina) Boca Juniors
June 30, 2015	DF	(Argentina) Marco Torsiglieri	(Ukraine) Metalist	(Argentina) Boca Juniors
June 30, 2015	FW	(Italy) Daniel Osvaldo	(England) Southampton	(Argentina) Boca Juniors

Position	Staff
Manager	(Argentina) Rodolfo Arruabarrena
Assistant coach	Diego Markic; Mauro Navas
Fitness coach	Gustavo Roberti; Pablo Santella
Goalkeeping coach	Fernando Gayoso
Doctor	Pablo Ortega Gallo
Kinesiologist	Rubén Araguas

== Pre-season and friendlies ==
=== Summer ===
Win Draw Loss Postponed

January 14, 2015 Pre-season	Ferrocarril Sud	0–3	Boca Juniors	Tandil
18:00		Report	Gigliotti 42'; Carrizo 68'; Vadalá 87'	Stadium: Estadio Dámaso Latasa; Attendance: 5.000; Referee: Lucas Novelli Sanz

January 17, 2015 Copa Ciudad de Mar del Plata	Boca Juniors	1–4	Racing Club	Mar del Plata
22:10	Calleri 1'; Erbes (red card) 24'; Gago (yellow card) 27'; Marín (red card) 28'	Report	Bou 17', 44', 71', (yellow card) 41'; Milito 22'; Saja (yellow card) 31'	Stadium: Estadio José María Minella; Referee: Patricio Loustau

January 20, 2015 Copa Ciudad de Mar del Plata	Boca Juniors	2–2	Vélez Sarsfield	Mar del Plata
22:10	P. Pérez 25'; Carrizo (yellow card) 49'; Gigliotti 67'	Report	Caraglio 26', 61'; Jerez (yellow card) 38'; Pérez Acuña (yellow card) 49'	Stadium: Estadio José María Minella

January 21, 2015 Pre-season	Boca Juniors (Argentina)	0–0	(Ecuador) Emelec	Buenos Aires, Argentina
17:00 UTC−3		Report		Stadium: Complejo Pedro Pompilio; Attendance: No attendance

January 24, 2015 Copa Julio H.Grondona	Boca Juniors	1–0	River Plate	Mar del Plata
22:10	Gigliotti (yellow card) 9'; Cristaldo 17', (yellow card) 18'; Cubas (yellow card) 22' (yellow-red card) 59'; P. Pérez (yellow card) 39'; Burdisso (yellow card) 65'	Report	Vangioni (yellow card) 32' (yellow-red card) 72'; Maidana (yellow card) 44' (yellow-red card) 90+3'; Gutiérrez (yellow card) 57'; Pisculichi (yellow card) 63'	Stadium: Estadio José María Minella; Referee: Néstor Pitana

January 31, 2015 Copa Luis B. Nofal	Boca Juniors	5–0	River Plate	Mendoza
22:10	Cristaldo 15'; Palacios (yellow card) 17', (goal) 21'; Chávez 30'; Gigliotti (yellow card) 63'; Díaz (yellow card) 80'; Calleri 81'; Bentancur 85' (yellow card) 89'	Report	Vangioni (yellow card) 10'; Mayada (yellow card) 14' (yellow-red card) 38'; Mercado (yellow card) 39'; Gutiérrez (yellow card) 14' (red card) 73'; Funes Mori (yellow card) 50'; Sánchez (red card) 56'	Stadium: Estadio Malvinas Argentinas; Referee: Diego Abal

February 5, 2015 Pre-season	Boca Juniors	2–1	Barracas Central	Buenos Aires
	P. Pérez 48'; Chávez 61'	Report	Casini	Stadium: La Bombonera

February 5, 2015 Pre-season	Boca Juniors	1–0	Barracas Central	Buenos Aires
	Palacios	Report		Stadium: La Bombonera

=== Winter ===
Win Draw Loss Postponed

June 27, 2015 International Community Cup	Jacksonville Armada FC (United States)	2–4	(Argentina) Boca Juniors	Florida, United States
21:00	Trejo 23' (pen.); Nicklaw (yellow card) 53'; Ortiz (yellow card) 69'; Williams (yellow card) 70'; Safi 86'	JAX Report; CABJ Report	Calleri 8'; Magallán (yellow card) 30'; Erbes (yellow card) 35'; Meli 62'; Cristaldo 74'; Chávez 82'	Stadium: EverBank Field; Attendance: 11,315; Referee: Mark Kadlecik (United States)

July 1, 2015 Challenge Cup	Fort Lauderdale Strikers (United States)	0–3	(Argentina) Boca Juniors	Florida, United States
21:00	Sanfilippo (yellow card) 30'; Ramírez (yellow card) 45+2'; Stefano (yellow card) 60'	FTL Report; CABJ Report	Calleri 3'; Rolín (yellow card) 6', (goal) 55'; Pérez (yellow card) 62'; Pavón 77'	Stadium: Lockhart Stadium; Attendance: 6,827; Referee: Jaime Herrera (United States)

July 4, 2015 "Giants of America" Cup	Deportivo Saprissa (Costa Rica)	0–1	(Argentina) Boca Juniors	San José, Costa Rica
22:00	Imperiale (yellow card) 23'; Soto (yellow card) 51'; Calderón (yellow card) 65'; Smith (yellow card) 67'	Report	Calleri (yellow card) 22', (goal) 28'; Bentancur (yellow card) 40'; Pérez (yellow card) 50'	Stadium: Estadio Nacional; Referee: Jeffrey Solís (Costa Rica)

October 10, 2015 BBVA Cup	River Plate	1–0	Boca Juniors	Córdoba
21:10	González 6'	Report	Magallán (yellow card) 25'; Sara (yellow card) 25'; Monzón (red card) 27'; Palacios (yellow card) 85'	Stadium: Estadio Mario Alberto Kempes; Referee: Federico Beligoy
Note: The match was suspended and rescheduled from June 9.

== Competitions ==
=== Overall ===
Competition	Started round	Final position/round	First match	Last match
Primera División	–	Winners	February 15, 2015	November 8, 2015
Copa Argentina	Round of 64	Winners	May 27, 2015	November 4, 2015
Copa Libertadores	Second stage	Round of 16	February 18, 2015	May 14, 2015

=== Overview ===
Competition	Record							
Competition	Pld	W	D	L	GF	GA	GD	Win %
Primera División	30	20	4	6	49	26	+23	66.67
Copa Argentina	6	6	0	0	15	1	+14	100.00
Copa Libertadores Playoff	1	1	0	0	1	0	+1	100.00
Copa Libertadores	8	6	1	1	19	3	+16	75.00
Total	45	33	5	7	84	30	+54	73.33

Last updated: September 20, 2015
Source: Competitions

=== Primera División ===
==== League table ====
Pos	Team	Pld	W	D	L	GF	GA	GD	Pts	Qualification
1	Boca Juniors (C)	30	20	4	6	49	26	+23	64	2016 Copa Libertadores group stage
2	San Lorenzo	30	18	7	5	44	20	+24	61	2016 Copa Libertadores group stage
3	Rosario Central	30	16	11	3	47	26	+21	59	2016 Copa Libertadores group stage
4	Racing	30	16	9	5	40	23	+17	57	2016 Copa Libertadores group stage
5	Independiente	30	14	12	4	44	22	+22	54	2016 Copa Sudamericana second stage

Source: AFA
(C) Champions

==== Relegation table ====
Pos	Team	2012–13 Pts	2013–14 Pts	2014 Pts	2015 Pts	Total Pts	Total Pld	Avg	Relegation
2	River Plate	64	58	39	49	210	125	1.68	
3	Boca Juniors	51	61	31	64	207	125	1.656	
4	San Lorenzo	58	60	26	61	205	125	1.64	

==== Results summary ====
Overall								Home						Away					
Pld	W	D	L	GF	GA	GD	Pts	W	D	L	GF	GA	GD	W	D	L	GF	GA	GD
30	20	4	6	49	26	+23	64	11	1	3	27	11	+16	9	3	3	22	15	+7

Source: AFA

==== Results by round ====
Round	1	2	3	4	5	6	7	8	9	10	11	12	13	14	15	16	17	18	19	20	21	22	23	24	25	26	27	28	29	30
Ground	H	A	H	A	H	A	H	A	H	A	H	A	H	A	H	A	H	A	H	A	H	A	H	A	A	H	H	A	H	A
Result	W	W	W	D	W	D	W	W	D	W	W	D	L	L	W	W	W	W	L	W	W	W	L	W	W	W	W	L	W	L
Position	3	1	1	2	2	3	2	1	2	1	1	1	2	3	2	1	1	1	2	2	2	1	2	1	1	1	1	1	1	1

Source: AFA
A = Away; H = Home; W = Win; D = Draw; L = Loss

==== Matches ====
Win Draw Loss Postponed

February 15, 2015 1	Boca Juniors	3–1	Olimpo	Buenos Aires
18:15 UTC−3	Gago 29' (pen.); Palacios 73', 86'	Report	Quiroga (yellow card) 21'; Furios (yellow card) 27'; Blanco 44' (yellow card) 65'; Klusener (yellow card) 83'	Stadium: La Bombonera; Referee: Fernando Echenique

February 22, 2015 2	Temperley	0–2	Boca Juniors	Turdera
21:30 UTC−3	Ledesma (yellow card) 24'; Crivelli (yellow card) 26'; Bojanich (yellow card) 29'; Sambueza (yellow card) 59'	Report	Lodeiro (yellow card) 12'; Martínez 27' (pen.); Pérez (yellow card) 29'; Orión (red card) 45+3'; Calleri (yellow card) 76' (goal) 90+1'; Monzón (yellow card) 77'	Stadium: Alfredo Beranger; Referee: Fernando Rapallini

March 1, 2015 3	Boca Juniors	1–0	Atlético de Rafaela	Buenos Aires
18:15 UTC−3	Calleri 19'; Meli (yellow card) 61'; Gago (yellow card) 90+2'	Report	Fernández (yellow card) 15'; Niz (yellow card) 25'; Serrano (red card) 68'	Stadium: La Bombonera; Referee: Darío Herrera

March 8, 2015 4	Colón	1–1	Boca Juniors	Santa Fe
21:30 UTC−3	Alario (yellow card) 30'; Ramírez (yellow card) 38'; Guanca 67'; Eguren (yellow card) 69'	Report	Martínez (yellow card) 24' (goal) 36'; Lodeiro (yellow card) 61'; Meli (yellow card) 75'	Stadium: Brigadier General Estanislao López; Referee: Germán Delfino

March 14, 2015 5	Boca Juniors	2–1	Defensa y Justicia	Buenos Aires
18:15 UTC−3	Díaz 31'; Osvaldo 43'; Erbes (yellow card) 57'; Orión (yellow card) 90+2'	Report	Juárez (yellow card) 18'; Leyes (yellow card) 35'; Martínez (yellow card) 39'; Busse (yellow card) 55'; Sánchez Sotelo 59'	Stadium: La Bombonera; Referee: Jorge Baliño

March 22, 2015 6	San Martín (SJ)	1–1	Boca Juniors	San Juan
21:30 UTC−3	Bogado (yellow card) 17'; Gelabert (yellow card) 41' (yellow-red card) 82'; Figueroa 65'; Pinedo (yellow card) 90+2'; Covea (yellow card) 90+9'	Report	Osvaldo 9' (pen.); Orión (yellow card) 23' (red card) 77'; Colazo (yellow card) 55'; Torsiglieri (yellow card) 67'; Erbes (yellow card) 90+9'	Stadium: Ingeniero Hilario Sánchez; Referee: Patricio Loustau

March 29, 2015 7	Boca Juniors	3–0	Estudiantes (LP)	Buenos Aires
18:15 UTC−3	Osvaldo (yellow card) 27' (goal) 40'; Erbes 38'; Cristaldo 78'	Report	Auzqui (yellow card) 13' (red card) 68'; Desábato (yellow card) 27'; Aguirregaray (yellow card) 57' (yellow-red card) 63'; Cerutti (yellow card) 65'	Stadium: La Bombonera; Referee: Diego Abal

April 5, 2015 8	Huracán	0–2	Boca Juniors	Buenos Aires
18:15 UTC−3	Sotelo (yellow card) 32'; Romero Gamarra (yellow card) 80'	Report	Meli (yellow card) 6' (goal) 24', 87'; Sara (yellow card) 35'; Pérez (yellow card) 76'	Stadium: Tomás Adolfo Ducó; Referee: Fernando Rapallini

April 12, 2015 9	Boca Juniors	0–0	Nueva Chicago	Buenos Aires
18:15 UTC−3	Díaz (yellow card) 46'; Meli (yellow card) 74'; Osvaldo (yellow card) 88'	Report	Ruiz (yellow card) 20'; Arias (yellow card) 34'; Vera (yellow card) 90'	Stadium: La Bombonera; Referee: Diego Abal

April 19, 2015 10	Lanús	1–3	Boca Juniors	Lanús
21:30 UTC−3	Ayala 1'; Fritzler (yellow card) 10'	Report	Pérez (yellow card) 10'; Carrizo 17'; Pavón 64'; Peruzzi (yellow card) 87'; Lodeiro 90+3' (pen.)	Stadium: Ciudad de Lanús; Referee: Fernando Echenique

May 3, 2015 11	Boca Juniors	2–0	River Plate	Buenos Aires
18:15 UTC−3	Díaz (yellow card) 34'; Chávez (yellow card) 37'; Pavón 84'; Pérez 87'	Report	Kranevitter (yellow card) 56'; Mora (yellow card) 65'	Stadium: La Bombonera; Referee: Patricio Loustau

May 10, 2015 12	Independiente	1–1	Boca Juniors	Avellaneda
21:30 UTC−3	Albertengo 8'; Mancuello (yellow card) 47' (yellow-red card) 89'; Victorino (yellow card) 59'	Report	Burdisso 37'; Castellani (yellow card) 65'; Sara (yellow card) 82'	Stadium: Libertadores de América; Referee: Silvio Trucco

May 24, 2015 13	Boca Juniors	0–3	Aldosivi	Buenos Aires
18:15 UTC−3	Pérez (yellow card) 5' (yellow-red card) 59'; Osvaldo (yellow card) 12' (penalty missed) 30'; Torsiglieri (yellow card) 40'; Monzón (yellow card) 52'	Report	Lequi 7'; Campodónico (yellow card) 27'; Martínez (yellow card) 27' (goal) 56'; Lamberti (yellow card) 42'; Vildozo (yellow card) 85' (goal) 88'	Stadium: La Bombonera; Referee: Pablo Díaz

May 31, 2015 14	Vélez Sarsfield	2–0	Boca Juniors	Buenos Aires
21:30 UTC−3	Desábato (yellow card) 11'; Amor (yellow card) 35'; Romero (yellow card) 41'; Cubero 71'; Pérez Acuña (yellow card) 78'; Pavone 85'	Report	Monzón (yellow card) 31'; Chávez (yellow card) 62'; Gago (red card) 83'; Díaz (yellow card) 84'; Erbes (yellow card) 87'	Stadium: José Amalfitani; Referee: Patricio Loustau

June 7, 2015 15	Boca Juniors	4–0	Newell's Old Boys	Buenos Aires
18:15 UTC−3	Díaz 4'; Bentancur (yellow card) 38'; Palacios 49'; Calleri 63'; Chávez 84' (pen.)	Report	Mateo (yellow card) 30'; Paz (yellow card) 83'	Stadium: La Bombonera; Referee: Diego Ceballos

July 12, 2015 16	Sarmiento	0–1	Boca Juniors	Junín
21:30 UTC−3	Miloc (yellow card) 42'; Peppino (yellow card) 52'; Dutari (yellow card) 76'	Report	Palacios 28'; Pérez (yellow card) 59'; Erbes (yellow card) 71'; Colazo (yellow card) 90+3'	Stadium: Eva Perón; Referee: Federico Beligoy

July 18, 2015 17	Boca Juniors	2–1	Quilmes	Buenos Aires
16:10 UTC−3	Palacios 26'; Monzón (yellow card) 51'; Calleri 52'; Rolín (yellow card) 59'	Report	Canelo (yellow card) 33' (goal) 58'; Bieler (yellow card) 55'; Scifo (yellow card) 60'; Calello (yellow card) 73'; Pérez Guedes (yellow card) 80'; Alegre (yellow card) 83'	Stadium: La Bombonera; Referee: Patricio Loustau

July 26, 2015 18	Belgrano	0–1	Boca Juniors	Córdoba
21:30 UTC−3	Farré (yellow card) 31'; Luján (yellow card) 73'; C. Pérez (yellow card) 90+1'	Report	P. Pérez (yellow card) 34' (yellow-red card) 58'; Gago 36'; Peruzzi (yellow card) 45' (red card) 66'; Calleri (yellow card) 52'; Orión (yellow card) 83'	Stadium: Mario Alberto Kempes; Referee: Diego Abal

August 2, 2015 19	Boca Juniors	3–4	Unión	Buenos Aires
18:15 UTC−3	Calleri 7', 87'; Orión (red card) 26'; Tevez (yellow card) 32' (goal) 46'; Díaz (yellow card) 64'; Bentancur (yellow card) 78'; Gago (yellow card) 90+2'	Report	Martínez (yellow card) 13' (goal) 36'; Malcorra 31' (pen.); Sánchez (yellow card) 45'; Fernández (yellow card) 45+4'; Brítez 64'; Soldano (yellow card) 74'; Villar (yellow card) 79'; Cardozo (yellow card) 83'; Gamba 90+1'	Stadium: La Bombonera; Referee: Jorge Baliño

August 16, 2015 20	Arsenal	1–2	Boca Juniors	Sarandí
21:30 UTC−3	Curado (yellow card) 25'; Fredes (yellow card) 35'; Zaldivia (yellow card) 69'; Silva (yellow card) 74'; Lértora (yellow card) 88'; Luna 90+4'	Report	Pérez 28' (yellow card) 76'; Rolín (yellow card) 53'; Palacios (yellow card) 59'; Calleri 67'	Stadium: Julio H. Grondona; Referee: Mauro Vigliano

August 23, 2015 21	Boca Juniors	2–0	Godoy Cruz	Buenos Aires
TBD UTC−3	Meli 38'; Tevez 65' (pen.); Gago (yellow card) 81'	Report	Zárate (yellow card) 21'; Fernández (yellow card) 28'; Giménez (yellow card) 37'; Jerez Silva (yellow card) 50'; Galeano (yellow card) 54'	Stadium: La Bombonera; Referee: Saúl Laverni

August 29, 2015 22	Gimnasia y Esgrima (LP)	1–2	Boca Juniors	La Plata
18:15 UTC−3	Benítez (red card) 21'; Oreja (yellow card) 41'; Mazzola 47'; Coronel (red card) 66'; Barsottini (yellow card) 69'; Navarro (yellow card) 77'	Report	Cubas (yellow card) 14'; Calleri (red card) 49'; Tobio (yellow card) 51'; Lodeiro 56'; Tevez (yellow card) 88'; Chávez 90'	Stadium: Juan Carmelo Zerillo; Referee: Diego Ceballos

September 6, 2015 23	Boca Juniors	0–1	San Lorenzo	Buenos Aires
18:15 UTC−3	Pérez (yellow card) 86'; Chávez (yellow card) 88'	Report	Yepes (yellow card) 38'; Buffarini (yellow card) 43'; Matos 90'	Stadium: La Bombonera; Referee: Fernando Echenique

September 13, 2015 24	River Plate	0–1	Boca Juniors	Buenos Aires
18:15 UTC−3	Ponzio (yellow card) 25'; González (yellow card) 39'; Sánchez (yellow card) 87'	Report	Lodeiro 18'; Erbes (yellow card) 21'; Meli (yellow card) 25'; Tobio (yellow card) 62'; Tevez (yellow card) 88'	Stadium: Monumental Antonio Vespucio Liberti; Referee: Darío Herrera

September 19, 2015 25	Argentinos Juniors	1–3	Boca Juniors	Buenos Aires
16:30 UTC−3	Matricardi (yellow card) 29'; Lenis (yellow card) 45' (yellow-red card) 45'; Ham 54'; Ledesma (yellow card) 72'; Laso (yellow card) 90+1'	Report	Cubas (yellow card) 28'; Tevez (yellow card) 39' (goal) 45', 53'; Bentancur (yellow card) 52'; Calleri 90+2'	Stadium: Diego Armando Maradona; Referee: Luis Álvarez

September 27, 2015 26	Boca Juniors	3–0	Banfield	Buenos Aires
18:15 UTC−3	Peruzzi 3'; Lodeiro (yellow card) 36'; Tobio (yellow card) 44'; Calleri 60'; Tevez 79'	Report	Yeri (yellow card) 19' (yellow-red card) 56'	Stadium: La Bombonera; Referee: Silvio Trucco

October 4, 2015 27	Boca Juniors	1–0	Crucero del Norte	Buenos Aires
18:30 UTC−3	Tevez (penalty missed) 8'; Tomasini 12' (o.g.)	Report	Ramírez (yellow card) 7'; Oliva (yellow card) 13'; Barraza (yellow card) 62'	Stadium: La Bombonera; Referee: Mauro Vigliano

October 18, 2015 28	Racing	3–1	Boca Juniors	Avellaneda
21:30 UTC−3	Acuña 5'; Bou 34' (pen.); Lollo (yellow card) 43'; Mansilla (yellow card) 82'; Saja 88' (pen.)	Report	Erbes (yellow card) 22' (yellow-red card) 77'; Calleri 23'; Pérez (yellow card) 26'; Díaz (red card) 30'; Orión (yellow card) 31'; Rolín (yellow card) 40'; Colazo (yellow card) 75'	Stadium: Presidente Juan Domingo Perón; Referee: Patricio Loustau

November 1, 2015 29	Boca Juniors	1–0	Tigre	Buenos Aires
18:00 UTC−3	Monzón 41'; Pérez (yellow card) 73'	Report	Sánchez (yellow card) 46'; Blengio (yellow card) 68'; Itabel (yellow card) 70'; Wilchez (yellow card) 77'; Galmarini (yellow card) 82'; Arzura (yellow card) 90+1'	Stadium: La Bombonera; Referee: Federico Beligoy

November 8, 2015 30	Rosario Central	3–1	Boca Juniors	Rosario
18:15 UTC−3	Delgado 63'; González (yellow card) 29'; Fernández 80'; Larrondo 90+3'	Report	Chávez 9'; Fuenzalida (yellow card) 29'; Cubas (yellow card) 59'; Rolín (yellow card) 62'	Stadium: Dr. Lisandro de la Torre; Referee: Mauro Vigliano

=== Copa Argentina ===
==== Round of 64 ====
May 27, 2015	Boca Juniors	2–0	Huracán Las Heras	San Juan
20:00 UTC−3	Osvaldo 84' (yellow card) 85'; Chávez 87' (yellow card) 89'	Report	Arce (yellow card) 57'; Palacio (yellow card) 73'	Stadium: Estadio San Juan del Bicentenario; Referee: Sergio Pezzotta

==== Round of 32 ====
July 29, 2015	Banfield	0–3	Boca Juniors	Formosa
19:30 UTC−3	Abelairas (yellow card) 50'; Vittor (yellow card) 55'; Bianchi Arce (red card) 66'; Domingo (yellow card) 83'	Report	Pérez 4'; Calleri 45'; Díaz (yellow card) 50'; Tevez 57'	Stadium: Estadio Antonio Romero; Referee: Darío Herrera

==== Round of 16 ====
August 19, 2015	Guaraní Antonio Franco	0–4	Boca Juniors	San Juan
21:00	Medina (yellow card) 50'; Formica (yellow card) 52'; Zárate (yellow card) 75'; Sagarzazu (yellow card) 80'; Albarracín (yellow card) 80'	Report	Gago 39'; Calleri 43'; Tevez 50' (pen.); Chávez 81' (pen.)	Stadium: Estadio San Juan del Bicentenario; Referee: Federico Beligoy

==== Quarterfinals ====
September 23, 2015	Defensa y Justicia	1–2	Boca Juniors	Córdoba
21:30	Medina (yellow card) 30'; Bertocchi 68'; Martínez (yellow card) 82'	Report	Tevez (penalty missed) 33' 52'; Tobio (yellow card) 56'; Cubas 72'; Díaz (yellow card) 81'	Stadium: Estadio Mario Alberto Kempes; Referee: Fernando Rapallini

==== Semifinals ====
October 23, 2015	Lanús	0–2	Boca Juniors	San Juan
19:00	Braghieri (yellow card) 13'; Velázquez (yellow card) 16'; Martínez (yellow card) 21'; Fritzler (yellow card) 54' (red card) 90+2'; Gómez (red card) 79'; Aguirre (yellow card) 90+3'	Report	Lodeiro 13' (pen.); Pérez (yellow card) 26'; Tevez 31'	Stadium: Estadio San Juan del Bicentenario; Referee: Saúl Laverni

==== Final ====
November 4, 2015	Rosario Central	0–2	Boca Juniors	Córdoba
21:10	Larrondo (yellow card) 24'; Musto (yellow card) 29'; Salazar (yellow card) 34'; Pinola (yellow card) 74' (yellow-red card) 90+3'	Report	Pérez (yellow card) 8'; Meli (yellow card) 19'; Lodeiro 55' (pen.); Chávez 89'	Stadium: Estadio Mario Alberto Kempes; Referee: Diego Ceballos

=== Copa Libertadores ===
==== Play Off ====
January 28, 2015 Copa Libertadores playoff	Boca Juniors	1–0	Vélez Sarsfield	Mar del Plata
	Gago (yellow card) 19'; Colazo 34'; Chávez (red card) 80'; Orión (yellow card) 90'	Report	Pellerano (yellow card) 38'; Somoza (yellow card) 46' (yellow-red card) 90'; Cubero (yellow card) 61'; Grillo (yellow card) 66' (yellow-red card) 85'	Stadium: Estadio José María Minella; Referee: Germán Delfino

==== Group stage ====
Pos	Team	Pld	W	D	L	GF	GA	GD	Pts	Qualification
1	(Argentina) Boca Juniors	6	6	0	0	19	2	+17	18	Advance to final stages
2	(Uruguay) Montevideo Wanderers	6	3	1	2	9	8	+1	10	Advance to final stages
3	(Chile) Palestino	6	2	1	3	6	6	0	7	
4	(Venezuela) Zamora	6	0	0	6	3	21	−18	0	

Source: CONMEBOL

February 18, 2015 1	Palestino (Chile)	0–2	(Argentina) Boca Juniors	Santiago, Chile
19:45 UTC−3	Riquelme (yellow card) 18'; Farías (yellow card) 20'; Contreras (yellow card) 29'; Valencia (yellow card) 74'	Report	Torsiglieri (yellow card) 18'; Burdisso (yellow card) 34'; Chávez 37'; Palacios 68'	Stadium: Estadio Santa Laura; Referee: Wilmar Roldán (Colombia)

February 26, 2015 2	Boca Juniors (Argentina)	2–1	(Uruguay) Montevideo Wanderers	Buenos Aires, Argentina
20:15 UTC−3	Komar 32'; Osvaldo 42'; Erbes (yellow card) 45'; Pérez (yellow card) 68'	Report	Olivera (yellow card) 31'; Riolfo 33'; Martínez (yellow card) 71'	Stadium: La Bombonera; Referee: Ricardo Marques (Brazil)

March 11, 2015 3	Boca Juniors (Argentina)	5–0	(Venezuela) Zamora	Buenos Aires, Argentina
20:00 UTC−3	Meli 7'; Lodeiro 14'; Carrizo 36'; Torsiglieri (yellow card) 40'; Osvaldo 68', 81' (pen.)	Report	Flores (yellow card) 19'; Vargas (yellow card) 59'	Stadium: La Bombonera; Referee: Hernando Buitrago (Colombia)

March 17, 2015 4	Zamora (Venezuela)	1–5	(Argentina) Boca Juniors	Barinas, Venezuela
22:15 UTC−3	Murillo 17'; Vargas (yellow card) 54' (yellow-red card) 56'	Report	Martínez 51', 90+6'; Colazo 57', 70'; Castellani (yellow card) 58'; Chávez 77'	Stadium: Estadio Agustín Tovar; Referee: Luiz Flávio de Oliveira (Brazil)

April 9, 2015 5	Montevideo Wanderers (Uruguay)	0–3	(Argentina) Boca Juniors	Montevideo, Uruguay
21:45 UTC−3	Rodríguez (yellow card) 37'; Bueno (yellow card) 60'; Reymundez (yellow card) 68'; Lima (yellow card) 73'; Silva (red card) 90+2'	Report	Calleri 8', 48'; Monzón (yellow card) 52' (goal) 73'; Bravo (yellow card) 55'; Orión (yellow card) 62'; Díaz (yellow card) 89'	Stadium: Estadio Gran Parque Central; Referee: Sandro Ricci (Brazil)

April 16, 2015 6	Boca Juniors (Argentina)	2–0	(Chile) Palestino	Buenos Aires, Argentina
19:45 UTC−3	Martínez (yellow card) 35'; Castellani (yellow card) 70'; Marín 81'; Gago (yellow card) 85'; Burdisso (yellow card) 87'; Calleri 90+2'	Report	Riquelme (yellow card) 24'	Stadium: La Bombonera; Referee: Wilton Sampaio (Brazil)
Note: The match was delayed eight minutes in the second time due to a low tension in the lights.

==== Final Stages ====
===== Round of 16 =====
May 7, 2015 First leg	River Plate (Argentina)	1–0	(Argentina) Boca Juniors	Buenos Aires, Argentina
21:00 UTC−3	Vangioni (yellow card) 12'; Funes Mori (yellow card) 53'; Ponzio (yellow card) 65'; Sánchez 81' (pen.) (yellow card) 82'; Gutiérrez (red card) 88'; Barovero (yellow card) 90+3'	Report	Cubas (yellow card) 5'; Burdisso (yellow card) 86'	Stadium: Monumental Antonio Vespucio Liberti; Referee: Germán Delfino (Argentina)

May 14, 2015 Second leg	Boca Juniors (Argentina)	0–0	(Argentina) River Plate	Buenos Aires, Argentina
21:00 UTC−3	Osvaldo (yellow card) 0'; Gago (yellow card) 22'; Pérez (yellow card) 44'; Pavón (yellow card) 45+1'	Report	Mammana (yellow card) 44'	Stadium: La Bombonera; Referee: Darío Herrera (Argentina)
Note: The second leg was suspended after River Plate players were attacked with tear gas by Boca Juniors fans when the squad returned to the field following halftime, with the match still 0–0 (River Plate leading 1–0 on aggregate). CONMEBOL opened disciplinary proceedings against Boca Juniors, and decided to disqualify them from the tournament on May 16, 2015.

== Team statistics ==
	Total	Home	Away	Neutral
Games played	44	19	19	6
Games won	33	14	12	6
Games drawn	5	2	3	None
Games lost	7	3	4	None
Biggest win	5–0 vs Zamora	5–0 vs Zamora	5–1 vs Zamora	4–0 vs Guaraní Antonio Franco
Biggest loss	0–3 vs Aldosivi	0–3 vs Aldosivi	0–2 vs Vélez Sarsfield	None
Biggest win (Primera División)	4–0 vs Newell's Old Boys	4–0 vs Newell's Old Boys	2–0 vs Temperley; Huracán	None
Biggest win (Copa Argentina)	4–0 vs Guaraní Antonio Franco	None		4–0 vs Guaraní Antonio Franco
Biggest win (Copa Libertadores)	5–0 vs Zamora	5–0 vs Zamora	5–1 vs Zamora	None
Biggest loss (Primera División)	0–3 vs Aldosivi	0–3 vs Aldosivi	0–2 vs Vélez Sarsfield	None
Biggest loss (Copa Argentina)	None			
Biggest loss (Copa Libertadores)	0–1 vs River Plate	None	0–1 vs River Plate	None
Clean sheets	26	12	8	6
Goals scored	84	36	32	16
Goals conceded	30	12	15	1
Goal difference	+54	+24	+17	+15
Yellow cards	103	39	54	10
Red cards	11	2	8	1
Top scorer	Calleri (15)	Calleri; Osvaldo (7)	Calleri (6)	Tevez (4)
Worst discipline	Orión (3 RC)	Pérez; Orión (1 RC)	Orión (2 RC)	Chávez (1 RC)
Penalties for	14	6	3	5
Penalties against	3	1	2	None

=== Season Appearances and goals ===
Last updated on November 8, 2015

No.	Pos	Nat	Player	Total		Primera División		Copa Argentina		Copa Libertadores	
No.	Pos	Nat	Player	Apps	Goals	Apps	Goals	Apps	Goals	Apps	Goals
Goalkeepers
1	GK	(Argentina) ARG	Agustín Orión	35	-19	22	-16	6	-1	7	-2
31	GK	(Argentina) ARG	Guillermo Sara	13	-12	9+3	-11	0	0	1	-1
12	GK	(Argentina) ARG	Bruno Galván	0	0	0	0	0	0	0	0
Defenders
2	DF	(Argentina) ARG	Daniel Díaz	38	2	28	2	6	0	4	0
3	DF	(Argentina) ARG	Luciano Fabián Monzón	24	2	16+1	1	4	0	3	1
4	DF	(Argentina) ARG	Gino Peruzzi	28	1	21+1	1	5	0	1	0
6	DF	(Argentina) ARG	Fernando Tobio	17	0	9+3	0	5	0	0	0
13	DF	(Uruguay) URU	Alexis Rolín	11	0	9+1	0	0+1	0	0	0
15	DF	(Argentina) ARG	Leandro Marín	13	1	4+2	0	1	0	6	1
22	DF	(Argentina) ARG	Lisandro Magallán	1	0	1	0	0	0	0	0
33	DF	(Argentina) ARG	Juan Cruz Komar	4	1	0	0	0	0	3+1	1
Midfielders
5	MF	(Argentina) ARG	Fernando Gago	25	3	14+2	2	3	1	5+1	0
8	MF	(Argentina) ARG	Pablo Pérez	26	3	16+2	2	4	1	2+2	0
14	MF	(Uruguay) URU	Nicolás Lodeiro	31	6	17+4	3	3+2	2	4+1	1
17	MF	(Argentina) ARG	César Meli	32	4	18+5	3	3+1	0	5	1
18	MF	(Argentina) ARG	Nicolás Colazo	33	3	19+4	1	3+1	0	5+1	2
19	MF	(Argentina) ARG	Federico Bravo	2	0	1	0	0	0	0+1	0
20	MF	(Argentina) ARG	Adrián Cubas	14	1	9	0	3	1	2	0
21	MF	(Argentina) ARG	Cristian Erbes	25	1	16+2	1	2	0	5	0
26	MF	(Chile) CHI	José Pedro Fuenzalida	18	0	6+7	0	0+2	0	1+2	0
28	MF	(Argentina) ARG	Tomas Pochettino	1	0	0+1	0	0	0	0	0
30	MF	(Uruguay) URU	Rodrigo Bentancur	25	0	9+9	0	2+4	0	0+1	0
32	MF	(Argentina) ARG	Franco Cristaldo	11	1	2+5	1	0	0	3+1	0
Forwards
7	FW	(Argentina) ARG	Cristian Pavón	9	2	1+5	2	0+1	0	2	0
10	FW	(Argentina) ARG	Carlos Tevez	17	9	12	5	5	4	0	0
25	FW	(Argentina) ARG	Andrés Chávez	23	8	6+9	3	1+2	3	5	2
27	FW	(Argentina) ARG	Jonathan Calleri	37	15	20+7	10	5+1	2	4	3
34	FW	(Argentina) ARG	Sebastián Palacios	22	6	13+5	5	1+1	0	2	1
Players transferred out during the season
12	GK	(Argentina) ARG	Emanuel Trípodi	0	0	0	0	0	0	0	0
6	DF	(Argentina) ARG	Marco Torsiglieri	17	0	11+1	0	1	0	4	0
24	DF	(Argentina) ARG	Guillermo Burdisso	11	1	4+1	1	0	0	5+1	0
11	MF	(Argentina) ARG	Federico Carrizo	18	2	11+1	1	1	0	3+2	1
16	MF	(Argentina) ARG	Gonzalo Castellani	4	0	1+1	0	0	0	0+2	0
7	FW	(Argentina) ARG	Juan Manuel Martínez	12	4	7+1	2	0	0	3+1	2
9	FW	(Argentina) ARG	Emanuel Gigliotti	1	0	0	0	0	0	1	0
23	FW	(Italy) ITA	Daniel Osvaldo	16	7	9+2	3	1	1	3+1	3
29	FW	(Argentina) ARG	Guido Vadalá	2	0	0	0	0	0	0+2	0

=== Top scorers ===
Last updated on November 8, 2015

Rank	Pos.	No.	Name	Primera División	Copa Argentina	Copa Libertadores	Total
1	FW	27	(Argentina) Jonathan Calleri	10	2	3	15
2	FW	10	(Argentina) Carlos Tevez	5	4		9
3	FW	25	(Argentina) Andrés Chávez	3	3	2	8
4	FW	23	(Italy) Daniel Osvaldo	3	1	3	7
5	FW	34	(Argentina) Sebastián Palacios	5		1	6
6	MF	14	(Uruguay) Nicolás Lodeiro	3	2	1	6
7	FW	–	(Argentina) Juan Manuel Martínez	2		2	4
8	MF	17	(Argentina) César Meli	3		1	4
9	MF	8	(Argentina) Pablo Pérez	2	1		3
10	MF	18	(Argentina) Nicolás Colazo	1		2	3
11	MF	5	(Argentina) Fernando Gago	2	1		3
12	MF	11	(Argentina) Federico Carrizo	1		1	2
13	FW	7	(Argentina) Cristian Pavón	2			2
14	DF	2	(Argentina) Daniel Díaz	2			2
15	DF	3	(Argentina) Luciano Fabián Monzón	1		1	2
16	DF	33	(Argentina) Juan Cruz Komar			1	1
17	MF	21	(Argentina) Cristian Erbes	1			1
18	MF	32	(Argentina) Franco Cristaldo	1			1
19	DF	15	(Argentina) Leandro Marín			1	1
20	DF	24	(Argentina) Guillermo Burdisso	1			1
21	MF	20	(Argentina) Adrián Cubas		1		1
22	DF	4	(Argentina) Gino Peruzzi	1			1
	–	–	Own goals	1			1
Total				50	15	19	84

=== Top assists ===
Last updated on November 8, 2015

Rank	Pos.	No.	Name	Primera División	Copa Argentina	Copa Libertadores	Total
1	MF	14	(Uruguay) Nicolás Lodeiro	4		2	6
2	MF	8	(Argentina) Pablo Pérez	3	2		5
3	FW	10	(Argentina) Carlos Tevez	2	1		3
4	MF	16	(Argentina) Gonzalo Castellani	1		2	3
5	MF	17	(Argentina) César Meli		1	2	3
6	FW	27	(Argentina) Jonathan Calleri	1		1	2
7	MF	11	(Argentina) Federico Carrizo	2			2
8	FW	–	(Argentina) Juan Manuel Martínez			2	2
9	MF	18	(Argentina) Nicolás Colazo	1		1	2
10	FW	34	(Argentina) Sebastián Palacios	1			2
11	FW	23	(Italy) Daniel Osvaldo	1			1
12	DF	15	(Argentina) Leandro Marín			1	1
13	MF	26	(Chile) José Pedro Fuenzalida			1	1
14	FW	25	(Argentina) Andrés Chávez			1	1
15	FW	29	(Argentina) Guido Vadalá			1	1
16	MF	5	(Argentina) Fernando Gago	1			1
17	MF	21	(Argentina) Cristian Erbes	1			1
Total				17	4	14	35

=== Penalties ===
Date	Penalty Taker	Scored	Opponent	Competition
February 15, 2015	Fernando Gago	Yes	Olimpo	Primera División
February 22, 2015	Juan Manuel Martínez	Yes	Temperley	Primera División
March 11, 2015	Daniel Osvaldo	Yes	Zamora	Copa Libertadores
March 22, 2015	Daniel Osvaldo	Yes	San Martín (SJ)	Primera División
April 19, 2015	Nicolás Lodeiro	Yes	Lanús	Primera División
May 24, 2015	Daniel Osvaldo	No	Aldosivi	Primera División
June 7, 2015	Andrés Chávez	Yes	Newell's Old Boys	Primera División
August 19, 2015	Carlos Tevez	Yes	Guaraní Antonio Franco	Copa Argentina
August 19, 2015	Andrés Chávez	Yes	Guaraní Antonio Franco	Copa Argentina
August 23, 2015	Carlos Tevez	Yes	Godoy Cruz	Primera División
September 23, 2015	Carlos Tevez	No	Defensa y Justicia	Copa Argentina
October 4, 2015	Carlos Tevez	No	Crucero del Norte	Primera División
October 23, 2015	Nicolás Lodeiro	Yes	Lanús	Copa Argentina
November 4, 2015	Nicolás Lodeiro	Yes	Rosario Central	Copa Argentina

=== Clean sheets ===
Last updated on November 8, 2015

Rank	Pos.	No.	Name	Primera División	Copa Argentina	Copa Libertadores	Total
1	GK	1	(Argentina) Agustín Orión	11	5	4	20
2	GK	31	(Argentina) Guillermo Sara	6			6
Total				17	5	4	26

=== Disciplinary record ===
Last updated on November 8, 2015

No.	Pos	Nat	Name	Primera División			Copa Argentina			Copa Libertadores			Total		
No.	Pos	Nat	Name	Booked	(yellow card) (yellow-red card)	Sent off (straight red)	Booked	(yellow card) (yellow-red card)	Sent off (straight red)	Booked	(yellow card) (yellow-red card)	Sent off (straight red)	Booked	(yellow card) (yellow-red card)	Sent off (straight red)
Goalkeepers
1	GK	(Argentina)	Agustín Orión	5		3				1			6		3
31	GK	(Argentina)	Guillermo Sara	2									2		
–	GK	(Argentina)	Bruno Galván												
Defenders
2	DF	(Argentina)	Daniel Díaz	4		1	2			1			7		1
3	DF	(Argentina)	Luciano F. Monzón	4						1			5		
4	DF	(Argentina)	Gino Peruzzi	2		1							2		1
6	DF	(Argentina)	Fernando Tobio	3			1						4		
13	DF	(Uruguay)	Alexis Rolín	4									4		
15	DF	(Argentina)	Leandro Marín												
22	DF	(Argentina)	Lisandro Magallán												
33	DF	(Argentina)	Juan Cruz Komar												
Midfielders
5	MF	(Argentina)	Fernando Gago	5		1				2			7		1
8	MF	(Argentina)	Pablo Pérez	8	2		2			2			12	2	
14	MF	(Uruguay)	Nicolás Lodeiro	3									3		
17	MF	(Argentina)	César Meli	5			1						6		
18	MF	(Argentina)	Nicolás Colazo	3									3		
19	MF	(Argentina)	Federico Bravo							1			1		
20	MF	(Argentina)	Adrián Cubas	3						1			4		
21	MF	(Argentina)	Cristian Erbes	5	1					1			6	1	
26	MF	(Chile)	José Pedro Fuenzalida	1									1		
28	MF	(Argentina)	Tomas Pochettino												
30	MF	(Uruguay)	Rodrigo Bentancur	3									3		
32	MF	(Argentina)	Franco Cristaldo												
Forwards
7	FW	(Argentina)	Cristian Pavón							1			1		
10	FW	(Argentina)	Carlos Tevez	4									4		
25	FW	(Argentina)	Andrés Chávez	3		1	1						4		1
27	FW	(Argentina)	Jonathan Calleri	2		1							2		1
34	FW	(Argentina)	Sebastián Palacios	1									1		
Players transferred out during the season
12	GK	(Argentina)	Emanuel Trípodi												
6	DF	(Argentina)	Marco Torsiglieri	2						2			4		
24	DF	(Argentina)	Guillermo Burdisso							3			3		
11	MF	(Argentina)	Federico Carrizo												
16	MF	(Argentina)	Gonzalo Castellani	1						2			3		
7	FW	(Argentina)	Juan Manuel Martínez	1						1			2		
9	FW	(Argentina)	Emanuel Gigliotti												
23	FW	(Italy)	Daniel Osvaldo	3			1			1			5		
29	FW	(Argentina)	Guido Vadalá												
Total				75	3	8	8			20			103	3	8
