= 2015 Copa Argentina Final =

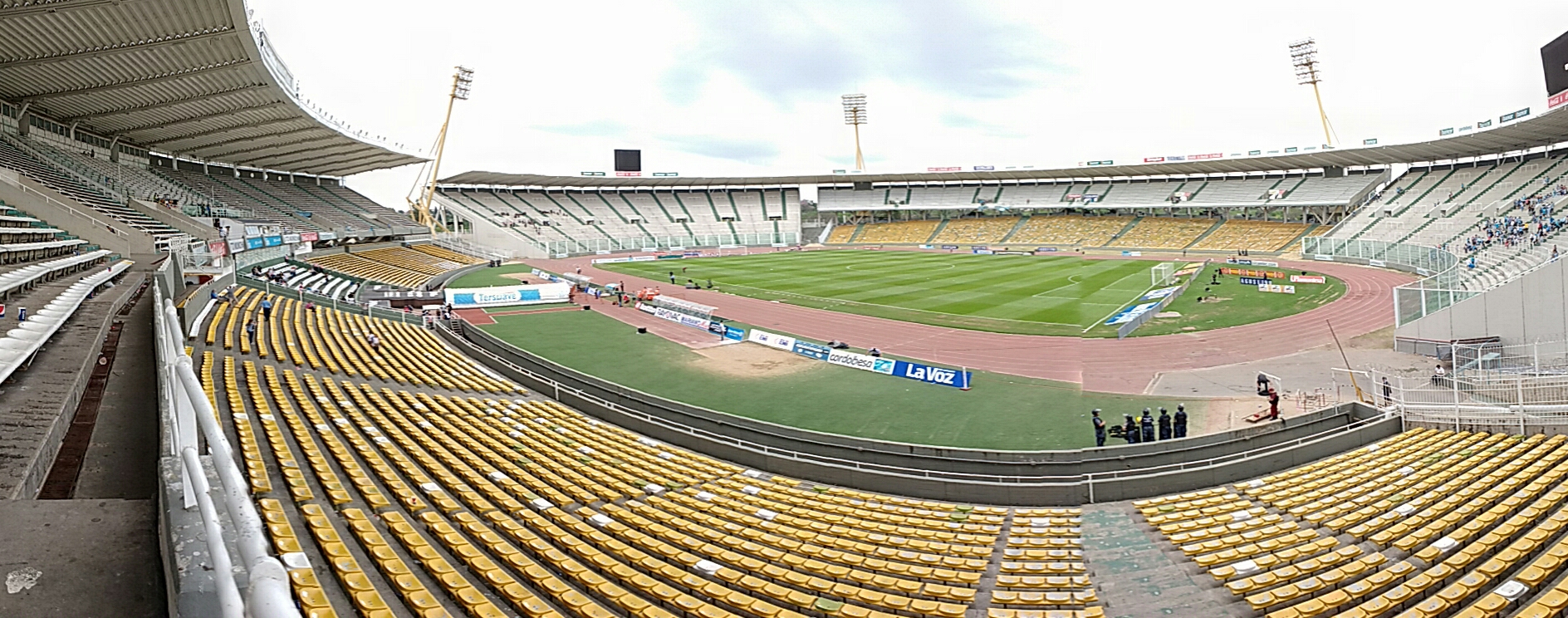
- Estadio Mario Alberto Kempes, venue
- Event: 2014–15 Copa Argentina
Rosario Central	Boca Juniors
0	2
- Date: November 4, 2015
- Venue: Estadio Mario Alberto Kempes, Córdoba
- Referee: Diego Ceballos

The 2015 Copa Argentina Final was the 218th and final match of the 2014–15 Copa Argentina. It was played on November 4, 2015, at the Estadio Mario Alberto Kempes de Córdoba between Rosario Central and Boca Juniors. Boca Juniors won the match 2–0. As champion, Boca Juniors qualified for the 2015 Supercopa Argentina. As runners-up, Rosario Central qualified for the 2016 Copa Libertadores.

The match was highly controversial due to referee Sergio Ceballos' performance, who –according to the media reports– committed severe mistakes that harmed Rosario Central. His rulings received negative criticism from both the media and fans, and caused the match to become the most controversial final in the history of the competition. Furthermore, Rosarian media referred to the match as "a robbery". while other media directly referred to a help from the referee to favor Boca Juniors.

== Qualified teams ==
Team	Previous finals app.
Rosario Central	1 (2014)
Boca Juniors	2 (**1969**, **2012**)

Bold indicates winning years

=== Road to the final ===
Rosario Central			Round	Boca Juniors		
Opponent	Venue	Score		Opponent	Venue	Score
			Final Round			
Deportivo Riestra	Junín	3–1	Round of 64	Huracán Las Heras	San Juan	2–0
River Plate	San Juan	2–0	Round of 32	Banfield	Formosa	3–0
Ferro Carril Oeste	Buenos Aires	0–0 (5–3 p)	Round of 16	Guaraní Antonio Franco	San Juan	4–0
Estudiantes (LP)	San Juan	2–1	Quarterfinals	Defensa y Justicia	Córdoba	2–1
Racing	Salta	1–0	Semifinals	Lanús	San Juan	2–0

== Match ==
=== First half ===
Boca Juniors, managed by Rodolfo Arruabarrena, dominated the opening minutes, winning the midfield battle due to a good performance of Cristian Erbes. Afterward, the game settled into a lull, as it became a midfield battle on a pitch that was beginning to show imperfections due to the rain that had fallen on Córdoba in the preceding days. In this game of imprecision, the Rosario team had their chances from set pieces, first, a long pass from the left by Franco Cervi was headed in by Marco Ruben (the goal was disallowed by assistant referee Marcelo Aumente because Marcelo Larrondo was offside), sparking controversy and the subsequent expulsion of manager Eduardo Coudet.

A few minutes later, another pass from Walter Montoya, this time from the right, found defender Javier Pinola unmarked, but he headed it over the bar. Boca Juniors pressed hard in the closing stages of the first 45 minutes, with the power and fighting spirit of Carlos Tevez, but they were consistently thwarted by Rosario Central's solid defense.

=== Second half ===
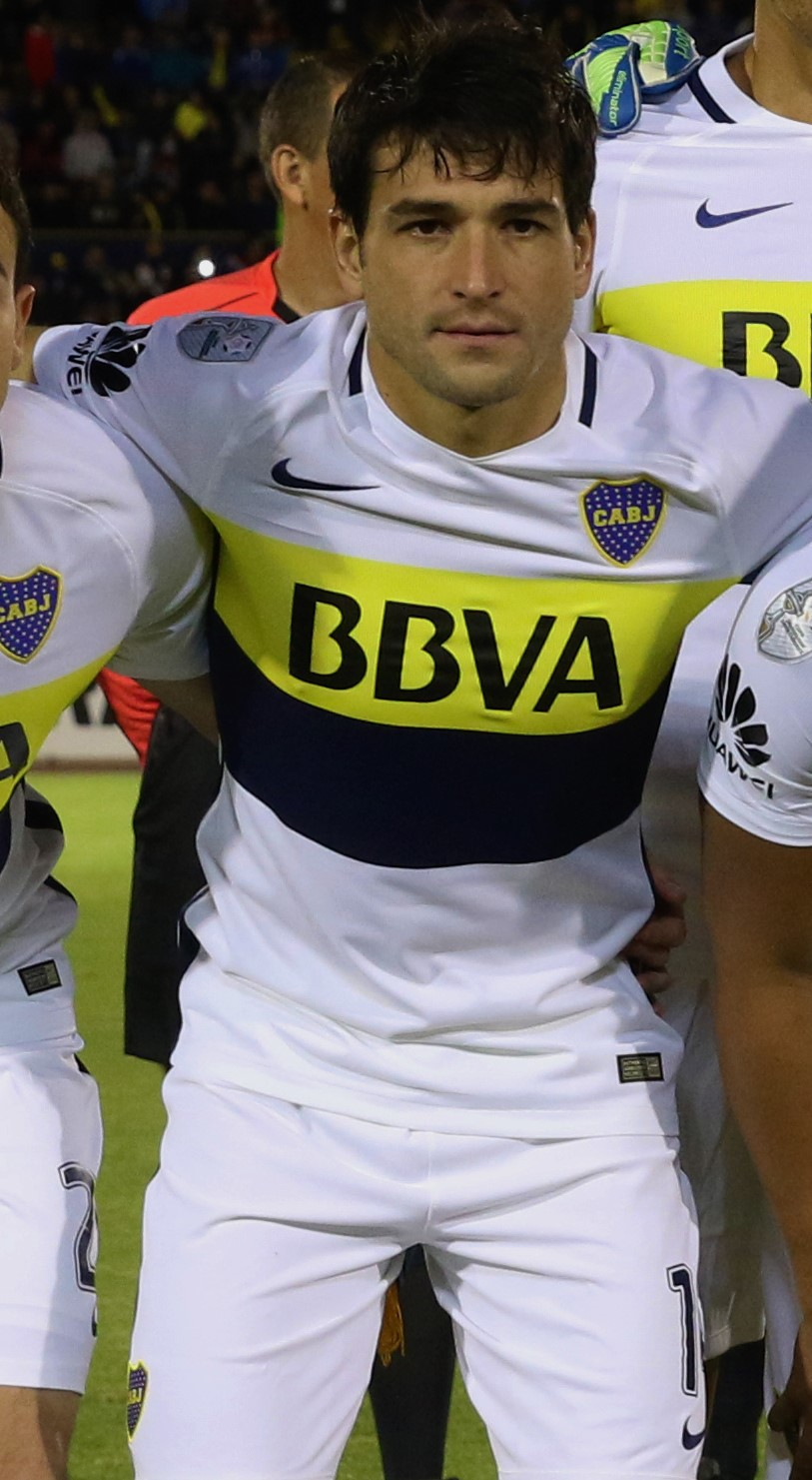
Nicolás Lodeiro scored the first goal for Boca Juniors

In the second half, Boca Juniors started stronger and Ceballos awarded them a penalty kick after eight minutes for a foul on Gino Peruzzi that –according to the media– occurred almost a meter outside the penalty area. Rosario Central's justified protests were in vain, as the referee didn't reverse his decision so Uruguayan midfielder Nicolás Lodeiro took the penalty, placing the ball perfectly inside the right post, while goalkeeper Manuel García dived the other side.

Boca could have sealed the victory on a couple of occasions through Rodrigo Bentancur, but the Uruguayan failed to capitalize. On the other hand, Rosario Central refused to give up. Despite the controversial rulings by Ceballos, they never stopped attacking and circulating the ball, although the minutes ticked by and luck seemed to be against them.

Then, in additional time, another controversial incident occurred: Andrés Chávez, in an offside position, received a pass from Marcelo Meli on the right and tapped it into the net. The entire Rosario Central team believed the goal would be disallowed for offside. However, the referee pointed to the center circle to allow the goal, making it 2–0.

Seconds before the end of the game, defender Javier Pinola was sent off after a hard foul on Chávez.

=== Details ===
2014–15 Copa Argentina Final
November 4, 2015
21:10

Rosario Central	0–2	Boca Juniors
	Report	Lodeiro 55' (pen.); Chávez 90'

Estadio Mario A. Kempes, Córdoba
Referee: Diego Ceballos

**Rosario Central**	**Boca Juniors**

GK	12	(Argentina) Manuel García
DF	29	(Argentina) Víctor Salazar	(yellow card) 35'	(substituted off) 71'
DF	2	(Argentina) Alejandro Donatti
DF	25	(Argentina) Javier Pinola	(yellow card) 74' (yellow-red card) 90+3'
DF	33	(Argentina) Cristian Villagra		(substituted off) 46'
MF	16	(Argentina) Walter Montoya		(substituted off) 83'
MF	5	(Argentina) Damián Musto	(yellow card) 30'
MF	11	(Argentina) José Luis Fernández
MF	10	(Argentina) Franco Cervi
FW	7	(Argentina) Marcelo Larrondo	(yellow card) 25'
FW	9	(Argentina) Marco Ruben (c)
Substitutes:
GK	1	(Argentina) Mauricio Caranta
DF	4	(Argentina) Paulo Ferrari		(substituted on) 46'
DF	6	(Colombia) Yeimar Gómez
MF	27	(Argentina) Jonás Aguirre
MF	23	(Argentina) Nery Domínguez		(substituted on) 71'
FW	19	(Argentina) César Delgado
FW	22	(Argentina) Franco Niell		(substituted on) 83'
Manager:
(Argentina) Eduardo Coudet			(red card) 38'

GK	1	(Argentina) Agustín Orión
DF	4	(Argentina) Gino Peruzzi
DF	6	(Argentina) Fernando Tobio
DF	2	(Argentina) Daniel Díaz
DF	3	(Argentina) Fabián Monzón
MF	21	(Argentina) Cristian Erbes
MF	17	(Argentina) Marcelo Meli	(yellow card) 20'
MF	8	(Argentina) Pablo Pérez	(yellow card) 9'	(substituted off) 61'
MF	14	(Uruguay) Nicolás Lodeiro		(substituted off) 89'
FW	10	(Argentina) Carlos Tevez (c)
FW	27	(Argentina) Jonathan Calleri		(substituted off) 83'
Substitutes:
GK	31	(Argentina) Guillermo Sara
DF	13	(Uruguay) Alexis Rolín		(substituted on) 89'
MF	18	(Argentina) Nicolás Colazo
MF	20	(Argentina) Adrián Cubas
MF	30	(Uruguay) Rodrigo Bentancur		(substituted on) 61'
FW	25	(Argentina) Andrés Chávez		(substituted on) 83'
FW	9	(Italy) Dani Osvaldo
Manager:
(Argentina) Rodolfo Arruabarrena

Assistant referees:
Javier Uziga
Marcelo Aumente
Fourth official:
Pedro Argañaraz

**Match rules**

- 90 minutes
- No extra time
- Penalty shoot-out if scores are level
- Seven named substitutes
- Maximum of three substitutions

=== Statistics ===
Overall
	Rosario Central	Boca Juniors
Goals scored	0	2
Total shots	6	8
Shots on target	1	4
Ball possession	54%	46%
Corner kicks	3	3
Fouls committed	17	18
Offsides	1	1
Yellow cards	5	2
Red cards	1	0

== Aftermath ==
The unfortunate night for Ceballos and his assistants generated, among other reactions from the football world, the publication of a statement by the Argentine Football Association. The day after the final, and signed by the then-president of the governing body of Argentine football, Luis Segura, the suspension of Diego Ceballos and Marcelo Aumente from their duties "indefinitely" was announced. However, some time later, both returned to their positions, although it was more difficult for Ceballos to return as the main referee in the first division. Therefore, he officiated more matches in the lower leagues.

Ceballos also lost his status as an international referee and became a referee in the lower divisions. During almost 10 years, he has officiated more than 200 matches in the Primera Nacional (second division), while only refereed ten Copa Argentina matches, all in the initial stages of that competition, and another ten Primera División matches, in addition to being a VAR official in 44 games and the fourth official in 51.
