= 2015 Supercopa Argentina =

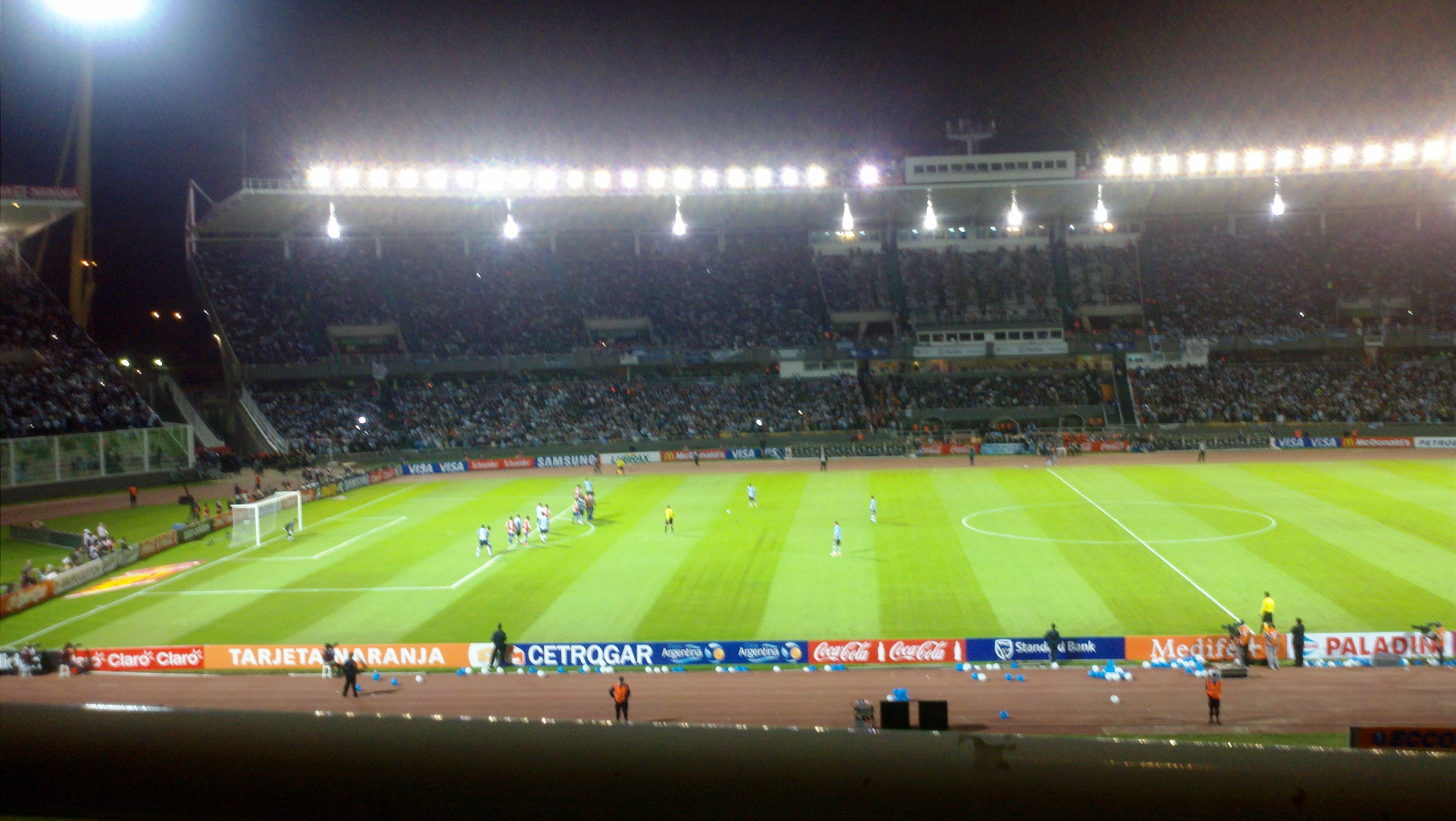
Boca Juniors	San Lorenzo
0	4
- Date: February 10, 2016
- Venue: Estadio Mario Alberto Kempes, Córdoba
- Man of the Match: Fernando Belluschi
- Referee: Darío Herrera

The 2015 Supercopa Argentina Final was the 4th edition of the Supercopa, an annual football match contested by the winners of the Argentine Primera División and Copa Argentina competitions. Because Boca Juniors had won both competitions, San Lorenzo, the runners-up to the Argentine Primera División, were selected as the other finalist of Supercopa Argentina. San Lorenzo beat Boca Juniors 4–0 in Córdoba and won the trophy. As champions, San Lorenzo qualified to the 2016 Copa Sudamericana.

== Qualified teams ==
Team	Qualification	Previous app.
Boca Juniors	2015 Primera División and 2014–15 Copa Argentina champion	2012
San Lorenzo	2015 Primera División runners-up	None

Bold indicates winning years

== Match ==
=== Details ===
February 10, 2016
21:10 UTC–3

Boca Juniors	0–4	San Lorenzo
	Report	Belluschi 44'; Barrientos 74', 83'; Blandi 89'

Estadio Mario Alberto Kempes, Córdoba
Referee: Darío Herrera

**Boca Juniors**	**San Lorenzo**

GK	1	(Argentina) Agustín Orión
DF	2	(Argentina) Daniel Díaz (c)
DF	6	(Argentina) Fernando Tobio
DF	33	(Argentina) Juan Manuel Insaurralde
MF	4	(Argentina) Gino Peruzzi		(substituted off) 46'
MF	17	(Argentina) Marcelo Meli
MF	20	(Argentina) Adrián Cubas	(yellow card) 69'
MF	8	(Argentina) Pablo Pérez	(yellow card) 25'	(substituted off) 46'
MF	3	(Argentina) Jonathan Silva	(yellow card) 82'
FW	10	(Argentina) Carlos Tevez
FW	25	(Argentina) Andrés Chávez		(substituted off) 60'
Substitutes:
GK	31	(Argentina) Guillermo Sara
DF	13	(Uruguay) Alexis Rolín
DF	24	(Colombia) Frank Fabra
MF	5	(Argentina) Fernando Gago		(substituted on) 46'
MF	14	(Uruguay) Nicolás Lodeiro		(substituted on) 60'
FW	34	(Argentina) Sebastián Palacios
FW	9	(Italy) Daniel Osvaldo		(substituted on) 46'
Manager:
(Argentina) Rodolfo Arruabarrena

GK	12	(Argentina) Sebastián Torrico
DF	7	(Argentina) Julio Buffarini	(yellow card) 79'
DF	6	(Argentina) Matías Caruzzo
DF	2	(Argentina) Marcos Angeleri
DF	21	(Argentina) Emmanuel Más
MF	28	(Argentina) Franco Mussis
MF	19	(Argentina) Fernando Belluschi
MF	20	(Paraguay) Néstor Ortigoza (c)	(yellow card) 51'
MF	23	(Argentina) Sebastián Blanco		(substituted off) 67'
FW	17	(Argentina) Ezequiel Cerutti		(substituted off) 72'
FW	9	(Uruguay) Martín Cauteruccio		(substituted off) 62'
Substitutes:
GK	29	(Argentina) Nicolás Navarro
DF	4	(Argentina) Gonzalo Prósperi
MF	8	(Argentina) Enzo Kalinski
MF	11	(Argentina) Pablo Barrientos		(substituted on) 67'
MF	10	(Argentina) Leandro Romagnoli		(substituted on) 72'
MF	15	(Argentina) Héctor Villalba
FW	18	(Argentina) Nicolás Blandi		(substituted on) 62'
Manager:
(Argentina) Pablo Guede

Assistant referees:
Hernán Maidana
Gustavo Rossi
Fourth official:
Fernando Espinoza

**Match rules**

- 90 minutes.
- Penalty shoot-out if scores still level.
- Seven named substitutes.
- Maximum of three substitutions.

=== Statistics ===
Overall
	Boca Juniors	San Lorenzo
Goals scored	0	4
Total shots	8	16
Shots on target	2	10
Ball possession	56	44
Corner kicks	5	3
Fouls committed	14	11
Offsides	2	1
Yellow cards	3	2
Red cards	0	0

2015 Supercopa Argentina winners
**San Lorenzo**
**1st Title**
