= Sebastián Palacios =

Argentine footballer

Personal information
- Full name: Sebastián Alberto Palacios
- Date of birth: 20 January 1992 (age 34)
- Place of birth: San Miguel de Tucumán, Argentina
- Height: 1.69 m (5 ft 6 1/2 in)
- Position: Right winger

Team information
- Current team: Aris
- Number: 34

Youth career
- Boca Juniors

Senior career*
Years	Team	Apps	(Gls)
2013–2016	Boca Juniors	37	(6)
2013–2014	→ Unión (loan)	39	(9)
2014	→ Sarandí (loan)	18	(2)
2016–2017	Talleres	38	(12)
2017–2019	Pachuca	28	(7)
2017	→ Talleres (loan)	5	(3)
2019–2021	Independiente	38	(6)
2020	→ Newell's Old Boys (loan)	17	(7)
2021–2024	Panathinaikos	93	(23)
2024–2025	Talleres	24	(2)
2025–2026	Levadiakos	31	(7)
2026–	Aris	4	(0)
- * Club domestic league appearances and goals as of 13 September 2026

Sebastián Alberto Palacios (born 20 January 1992) is an Argentine professional footballer who plays as a right winger for Greek Super League club Aris.

== Career ==
Boca Juniors

Sebastian Palacios from the age of 11 he joined the academy of Boca Juniors, one of the top clubs in Argentina. At the age of 21 he made his debut in the first team and within a period of two months he played in six official games. In the summer of 2013, he was loaned to Unión de Santa Fe, a Primera Nacional club, where he was a key player, having 39 appearances and 9 goals. A season later, Boca loaned him to Arsenal Sarandi to test his progress in a Primera División club. After 18 appearances and 2 goals in 6 months he returned to Boca Juniors in January 2015.

At the end of the 2015 season with 30 appearances, 6 goals and 3 assists along with the Primera División title of champion was one of the protagonists of the campaign. In the first half of 2016 he was again a key player with 19 appearances and 2 goals.

Talleres

In the summer of 2016, Talleres de Córdoba bought him from Boca, and with 29 appearances and 9 goals, Palacios emerged as the protagonist of his new club.

Pachuca

After two years, in January 2018 Talleres accepted an offer for almost €5 million from the Mexican club Pachuca.

In Mexico, Palacios had 16 appearances and 7 goals in just 4 months. The first half of the 2018–19 Liga MX season was not so productive, and Pachuca accepted the offer of his previous club Talleres on a season loan. Palacios managed to score 7 times in 16 games and consequently got a second transfer, as Pachuca accepted a €2.3 million offer from Independiente.

Independiente

He initially played for the club (2 goals in 14 appearances), but after six months he loaned out to Newell's Old Boys for the rest of the season. He played there for almost a season and returned in the winter of 2021 to Independiente.

Panathinaikos

On 31 August 2021, Palacios signed a three-year contract with Greek side Panathinaikos for an undisclosed fee. On October 16, 2021, Palacios scored his first goal for the club in a 4–1 win against Ionikos. He finished his first season as Panathinaikos's top scorer with 13 goals at all competitions,11 at Super League, and 2 at the Greek Cup. These goals helped Panathinaikos to win this Cup for the first time in 8 years.

Talleres

On 16 July 2024, Palacios returned to Argentina to sign a two-year contract with Talleres de Córdoba.

== Career statistics ==
=== Club ===
As of match played 7 April 2026

Club	Season	League			National cup (Note: Includes Copa Argentina, Copa MX, Greek Football Cup)		Continental		Other		Total	
Club	Season	Division	Apps	Goals	Apps	Goals	Apps	Goals	Apps	Goals	Apps	Goals
Boca Juniors	2012–13	Primera División	6	0	1	0	—		—		7	0
Boca Juniors	2015	Primera División	18	5	3	0	2 (Note: Appearances in Copa Libertadores)	1	—		23	6
Boca Juniors	2016	Primera División	13	1	0	0	6	1	3	0	22	2
Boca Juniors	Total		37	6	4	0	8	2	3	0	52	8
Unión (loan)	2013–14	Primera Nacional	39	9	0	0	—		—		39	9
Sarandi (loan)	2014	Primera División	18	2	0	0	—		—		18	2
Talleres	2016–17	Primera División	29	9	1	0	—		1	0	31	9
Talleres	2017–18	Primera División	9	3	1	0	—		—		10	3
Talleres	Total		38	12	2	0	—		1	0	41	12
Pachuca	2017–18	Liga MX	16	7	4	0	—		—		20	7
Pachuca	2018–19	Liga MX	12	0	4	1	—		—		16	1
Pachuca	Total		28	7	8	1	—		—		36	8
Talleres (loan)	2018–19	Primera División	5	3	5	4	4	0	1	0	15	7
Newell's Old Boys (loan)	2019–20	Primera División	6	2	1	1	—		—		7	3
Newell's Old Boys (loan)	2019–20	Primera División	11	5	1	0	—		—		12	5
Newell's Old Boys (loan)	Total		17	7	2	1	—		—		19	8
Independiente	2019–20	Primera División	14	2	2	0	2 (Note: Appearances in Copa Sudamericana)	0	—		18	2
Independiente	2020–21	Primera División	24	4	2	0	7	0	—		35	4
Independiente	Total		38	6	4	0	9	0	—		51	6
Panathinaikos	2021–22	Super League Greece	35	11	8	2	—		—		43	13
Panathinaikos	2022–23	Super League Greece	33	6	4	0	1 (Note: Appearance in UEFA Europa Conference League)	0	—		38	6
Panathinaikos	2023–24	Super League Greece	25	6	3	0	11 (Note: Appearances in UEFA Champions League)	1	—		39	7
Panathinaikos	Total		93	23	15	2	12	1	—		120	26
Talleres	2024	Primera División	13	2	1	0	1	0	—		15	2
Talleres	2025	Primera División	11	0	0	0	3	0	—		14	0
Talleres	Total		24	2	1	0	4	0	—		29	2
Levadiakos	2025–26	Super League Greece	25	6	6	1	—		—		31	7
Career total			362	83	47	9	37	3	5	0	451	95

== Honours ==
=== Clubs ===
Boca Juniors

- Primera División: 2015
- Copa Argentina: 2014–15

Panathinaikos

- Greek Cup: 2021–22, 2023–24

=== Individual ===
- Panathinaikos Player of the Season r: 2021–22
- Super League Greece Best Foreign Player: 2021–22
- Super League Greece Player of the Month: February 2022, March 2022
- Super League Greece–Fantasy League Award Winger of the Season: 2021–22
- Super League Greece Team of the Season: 2021–22
