= Kevin Itabel =

Argentine footballer

Personal information
- Date of birth: August 20, 1993 (age 33)
- Place of birth: Buenos Aires, Argentina
- Height: 1.79 m (5 ft 10 in)
- Position: Midfielder

Team information
- Current team: Gallipoli

Youth career
- Tigre

Senior career*
Years	Team	Apps	(Gls)
2011–2018	Tigre	47	(6)
2016–2017	→ Atletico de Rafaela (loan)	12	(2)
2017	→ Ferro (loan)	3	(0)
2018	Panetolikos	4	(0)
2018–2019	Sportivo Italiano	0	(0)
2019–2020	Deportivo Camioneros	8	(1)
2021	Trinitapoli		
2021–	Gallipoli		
- * Club domestic league appearances and goals as of 17:58, 4 September 2022 (UTC)

Kevin Itabel (born 20 August 1993) is an Argentine footballer who plays as a midfielder for Italian side Gallipoli.
