= Lucas Novelli Sanz =

Argentine football referee

- Born: May 15, 1986 (age 40); Tandil, Buenos Aires Province, Argentina

Domestic
Years	League	Role

International
Years	League	Role
2021–	FIFA / IFAB (VAR certified)	Video Assistant Referee (VAR)

Lucas Ariel Novelli Sanz (born 15 May 1986) is an Argentine football referee and Video Assistant Referee (VAR). He officiates matches organized by the Argentin Football Association (AFA) and has served as a VAR official in international competitions following certification by FIFA and the International Football Association Board (IFAB).

== Early life ==
Novelli Sanz is from Tandil, in Buenos Aires Province. In interviews, he has stated that his interest in refereeing was influenced by his family environment and early exposure to local football. Before becoming a full-time referee, he worked outside professional football while progressing through the officiating ranks.

== Refereeing career ==
Novelli Sanz began refereeing in regional competitions before advancing through the AFA system and later officiating matches in Argentina's professional divisions, including the Primera División.

He has spoken publicly about the implementation of VAR in Argentine football, describing it as a technological support tool that assists referees while maintaining the authority of on-field officials.

== VAR certification and international role ==
In 2021, Novelli Sanz was among the first group of Argentine referees to receive official VAR certification from FIFA and IFAB, as announced by the AFA.

In 2024, he was designated as an international VAR referee, enabling him to serve as a video official in CONMEBOL competitions.

== Notable assignments ==
Novelli Sanz has been appointed as a VAR or assistant VAR in high-profile domestic matches. He served as assistant VAR for the 2022 Trofeo de Campeones final between Boca Juniors and Racing Club.

== Personal life ==
According to interviews, Novelli Sanz is married and has children. He has discussed balancing family life with the professional demands of refereeing, particularly after transitioning to full-time officiating.
