= Fabián Monzón =

Argentine footballer

Personal information
- Full name: Luciano Fabián Monzón
- Date of birth: 13 April 1987 (age 39)
- Place of birth: Granadero Baigorria, Argentina
- Height: 1.79 m (5 ft 10 in)
- Position: Left-back

Youth career
- Boca Juniors

Senior career*
Years	Team	Apps	(Gls)
2008–2011	Boca Juniors	59	(2)
2008–2009	→ Betis (loan)	13	(2)
2011–2012	Nice	35	(8)
2012–2013	Lyon	5	(0)
2013	→ Fluminense (loan)	2	(0)
2013–2015	Catania	38	(2)
2015	→ Boca Juniors (loan)	17	(1)
2016–2018	Universidad de Chile	37	(2)
2019–2021	Atlético Tucumán	24	(2)
2022	Mitre		
2023	Bonsucesso		

International career
2008	Argentina U23	5	(0)
2008–2011	Argentina	7	(0)
Medal record
Representing Argentina
Men's Football
Olympic Games
Gold medal – first place	2008 Beijing	Team competition
- * Club domestic league appearances and goals as of 20:38, 13 March 2022 (UTC)

Luciano Fabián Monzón (born 13 April 1987) is an Argentine professional footballer who plays as a left-back.

== Club career ==
=== Boca Juniors ===
Born in Granadero Baigorria, Monzón began his professional career with Boca Juniors in 2007 after being promoted out of the club's youth academy. He made his Boca Juniors debut during the 2008 Clausura tournament in Boca Juniors, and was a surprise choice for the Argentina squad for the 2008 Olympic Games later that year. This doubt was put to rest as Monzón started every match as the team went on to win gold.

Unsurprisingly, after Monzón's performance at the Olympics he moved to Europe to play for Real Betis in La Liga for a reported €9 million after being linked with a move to German side, Hamburg since the Olympics had begun. It was later revealed that Monzón had moved on a loan deal with the option to purchase the player outright in the summer of 2009. Monzón scored his first goal with Betis on his debut against FC Barcelona at the Camp Nou on 24 September 2008, however, Real Betis eventually lost the game 3–2.

Monzón returned to Boca after his loan deal with Betis ran out in July 2009. Upon his return he revealed his remarkably low monthly wage at Boca.

"The contract can't be changed, because before going to Betis I signed a contract for five years, and I have to respect it. I earn 2,000 pesos [€376], and from what has been spoken, they don't want to increase it, not even a little bit. But I will still stay at Boca."

— Luciano Fabián Monzón.

In his first season back with Boca, Monzón earned a regular playing time for his native club, playing in 23 league matches, with 2 goals. In August 2010, after his first season back in Argentina, he had two failed transfer attempts. First, he failed to move to Ukrainian side Dnipro due to a congenital heart condition and a few days later a second transfer was cancelled, this time to Serie A team Udinese, admittedly by differences in payment method. Despite the failed transfer attempts, Monzón continued to feature for the club, making 20 league appearances during the 2010-11 campaign, which ultimately would be his last at the club, before finally completing a permanent transfer to Europe with French side, OGC Nice.

=== OGC Nice ===
On 11 July 2011 Monzón signed a 4-year contract with OGC Nice in the French Ligue 1. Monzón made his debut for Nice on 6 August 2011, in a 1–3 home loss against Lyon. During his one and only season in Nice, he was a regular feature in the club's starting lineup, managing 34 league appearances, marked with 8 goals, a great performance for a left defender. Monzón was set to begin the 2012–13 season with Nice, before completing a late transfer to Lyon on 26 August 12. His final match for Nice came on the opening matchday of the 2012–13 season: a 0–1 home defeat to Ajaccio on 11 August 2012.

=== Olympique Lyonnais ===
On 26 August 2012, Monzón officially was unveiled as a new signining for 7-time French champions Olympique Lyonnais on a 4-year contract. Monzón was purchased by the club to replace Aly Cissokho who signed for Valencia earlier in the summer.
The transfer fee was worth €3 million with bonus variables of up to €1 million. With Lyon, the player began the season as a first team regular before losing his place in the team sheet after just 5 league appearances. Goal.com named Monzón as the worst transfer signing of the 2012–13 season.

On 9 January 2013, Monzón signed a 6-month loan deal with Brazilian national champions Fluminense in order to replace Thiago Carleto who returned to São Paulo. He returned to Lyon on 16 July 2013 before being sold to Serie A side Catania.

=== Calcio Catania ===
On 16 July 2013, Monzón officially signed for Calcio Catania in the Italian Serie A on a four-year contract for €3.3 million, while a further €300,000 could be paid on performance-related bonuses.

=== Return to Boca Juniors ===
In 2015, Monzón returned to his first club, Boca Juniors.

=== Universidad de Chile ===
On 20 January 2016, Monzón signed for Club Universidad de Chile on a free transfer.

== International career ==
Monzón was a member of the Argentine squad for the 2008 Beijing Olympics, which also were figures like Lionel Messi, Sergio Agüero, Ángel Di María and Juan Román Riquelme. Argentina went on to win his second consecutive gold medal in those Olympics.

He has been sporadically nominated for the Argentina national football team, accumulating seven appearances since 2009.

== Honours ==
Boca Juniors

- Primera División: 2015
- Copa Argentina: 2015

Argentina U-23

- Summer Olympics Gold Medal: 2008
