= Cristian Erbes =

Argentine footballer

Personal information
- Full name: Cristian Damián Erbes
- Date of birth: 6 January 1990 (age 36)
- Place of birth: Buenos Aires, Argentina
- Height: 1.70 m (5 ft 7 in)
- Position: Midfielder

Team information
- Current team: Club Atlético San Miguel
- Number: 15

Youth career
- 1996–2009: Boca Juniors

Senior career*
Years	Team	Apps	(Gls)
2009–2016	Boca Juniors	153	(5)
2016–2017	Veracruz	0	(0)
2017	Chacarita Juniors	8	(0)
2018	Karpaty Lviv	23	(1)
2019	Nacional	10	(0)
2019–2021	Atlético Tucumán	48	(0)
2022–2023	Deportes La Serena	23	(0)
2023	Ferro Carril Oeste	32	(2)
2024	Emelec	20	(0)
2025–	Club Atlético San Miguel	7	(0)
- * Club domestic league appearances and goals as of 22:07, 18 April 2025 (UTC)

Cristian Damián Erbes (born 6 January 1990 in Buenos Aires) is an Argentine professional footballer who plays as a midfielder for Club Atlético San Miguel.

He made his debut during the 2009–10 season playing for Boca Juniors.

== Honours ==
Boca Juniors

- Argentine Primera División: 2011 Apertura, 2015
- Copa Argentina: 2011–12, 2014–15
