= Andrés Chávez =

Argentine footballer

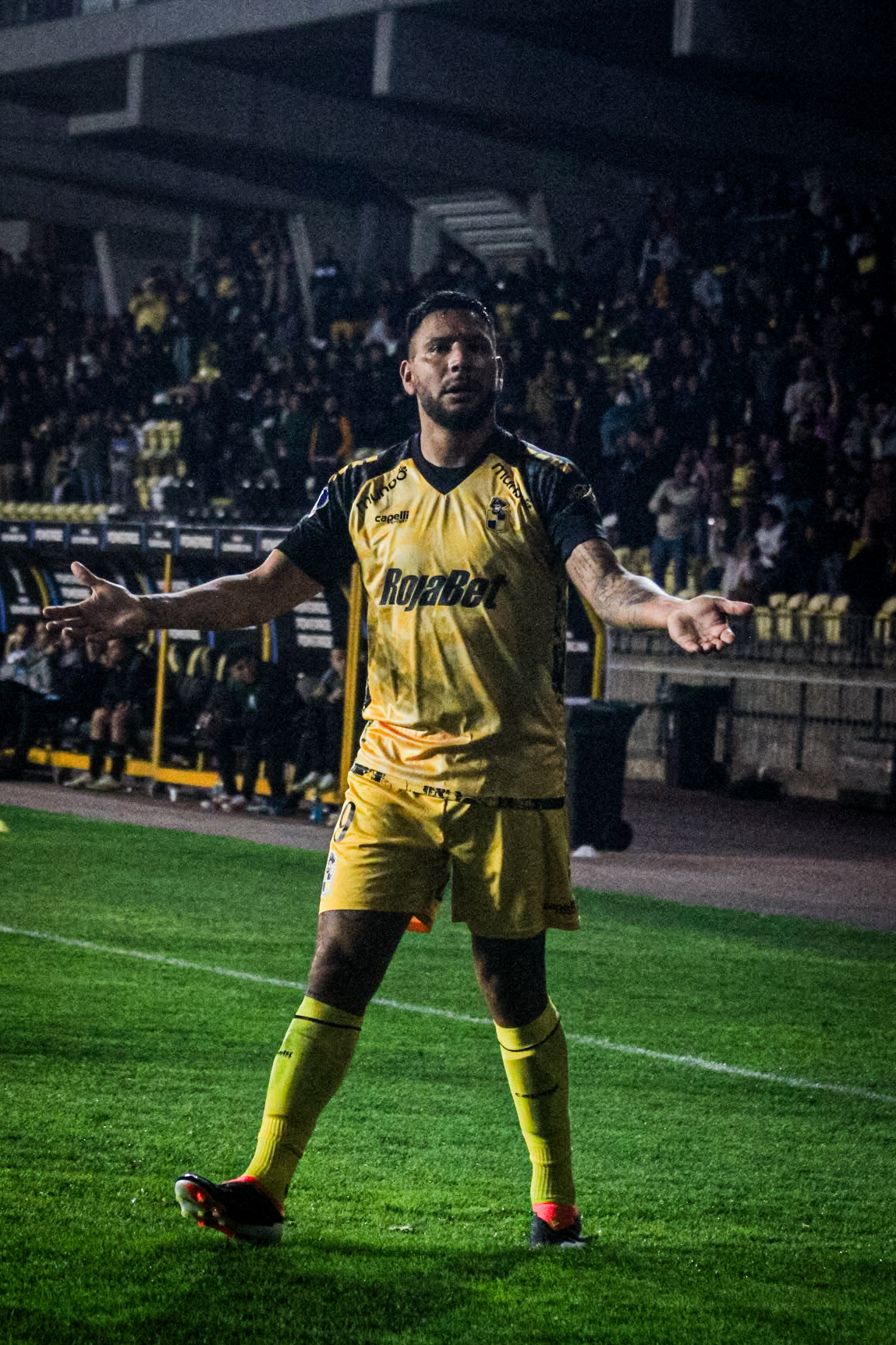

Personal information
- Full name: Andrés Eliseo Chávez
- Date of birth: 21 March 1991 (age 35)
- Place of birth: Salto, Argentina
- Height: 1.84 m (6 ft 0 in)
- Position: Forward

Team information
- Current team: Aldosivi
- Number: 18

Youth career
- 2001–2010: Banfield

Senior career*
Years	Team	Apps	(Gls)
2010–2014	Banfield	73	(31)
2014–2017	Boca Juniors	64	(18)
2016–2017	→ São Paulo (loan)	29	(11)
2017–2018	Panathinaikos	6	(1)
2018–2021	Huracán	59	(15)
2021	AEL Limassol	10	(0)
2022	Wilstermann	15	(8)
2022–2023	Banfield	30	(3)
2023	Nasaf	10	(1)
2024	Coquimbo Unido	20	(4)
2025	Lamia	7	(0)
2025–2026	The Strongest	11	(3)
2026	Almagro	6	(1)
2026–	Aldosivi	12	(0)
- * Club domestic league appearances and goals as of 17:46, 6 November 2026 (UTC)

Andrés Eliseo Chávez (born 21 March 1991) is an Argentine professional footballer who plays as a forward, who plays for Aldosivi.

He is nicknamed Comandante, after Venezuelan former President Hugo Chávez.

== Club career ==
=== Boca Juniors ===
Chávez scored his second and third goal in Boca Juniors against Rosario Central for the Copa Sudamericana on 18 September, the match ended 3–0. On 4 November 2015, Chávez scored the second goal in the 2015 Copa Argentina Final helping Boca defeat Rosario Central 2–0, and secure their domestic double.

=== São Paulo ===
Chávez made his first goal for São Paulo FC in his second match for new club, against Atlético Mineiro, on 4 August 2016. He scored twice in the São Paulo victory for 2–1 against Santa Cruz, 7 August .

=== Panathinaikos ===
On 14 August 2017, Super League Greece club Panathinaikos completed the deal for the Boca Juniors striker. The Greens have agreed with Boca Juniors for the transfer of Chavez, with a fee of €1.3 million for the 50% of his rights, the player agreed to a three years' contract. The deal could rise up to €2.6 million if the Greek club decides to purchase the remaining 50% of his rights within the next 3 years. The most expensive of all 2016–17 season signings, the Argentine striker arrived with the most fanfare but ultimately failed enormously to the point where his transfer is the biggest miss. Bought to replace the ever-reliable Marcus Berg, the former Boca Juniors winger made an instant impact by scoring in his debut. On 20 August 2017 he made his debut for the club, which was combined with his first goal in 1–1 away draw against Platanias. This however, proved to be a false dawn as injury and poor attitude got in the way. He also scored in a Greek Cup match against AEL.

It was questioned in the beginning whether he even wanted to transfer to Greece, and on 23 September 2017, Chavez suffered a hamstring injury which will keep him on the sidelines for several weeks. Chavez picked up a hamstring injury in the 2–0 defeat from Panetolikos F.C. This is another serious blow at Panathinaikos as the Greens are running a dreadful form in the Super League Greece with only three points out of five games. Due to his unprofessional attitude Chavez was released by the greens on 14 December 2017. The reason behind this was that Chavez flew to Argentina and never returned. With the concern raised in Panathinaikos about the debt to Boca Juniors and the refusal of the player to continue in the Greek Super League the information from Argentina that Estudiantes are interested in the player to cover part of Panathinaikos's debt even with me the form of loan for the rest of the season, will be an important help for the struggling financially Greens.

=== Huracán ===
On 16 January 2018, Chavez signed a contract with Huracán returning to his country. After his passage through Panathinaikos, the forward returns to Argentina "I am very happy to return to my country," he said in a dialogue with Tyc Sports. The transfer, as reported, was in the range of €1.3 million, with Panathinaikos covered the debt that had since last summer with Boca Juniors and Banfield. Thus they weakened the annual budget of the club, together with the player's contract (€750,000 per year), which was the biggest one in the roster of the Greens.

=== Coquimbo Unido ===
In 2024, he moved to Chile and signed with Coquimbo Unido from Nasaf.

== Style of play ==
Chávez has a strong shot and a great presence in penalty area. His playing style has drawn comparisons to that of Jonathan Calleri, a former colleague of Chávez at Boca Juniors.

== Honours ==
Boca Juniors

- Argentine Primera División: 2015
- Copa Argentina: 2014–15
