= Agustín Orión =

Argentine footballer

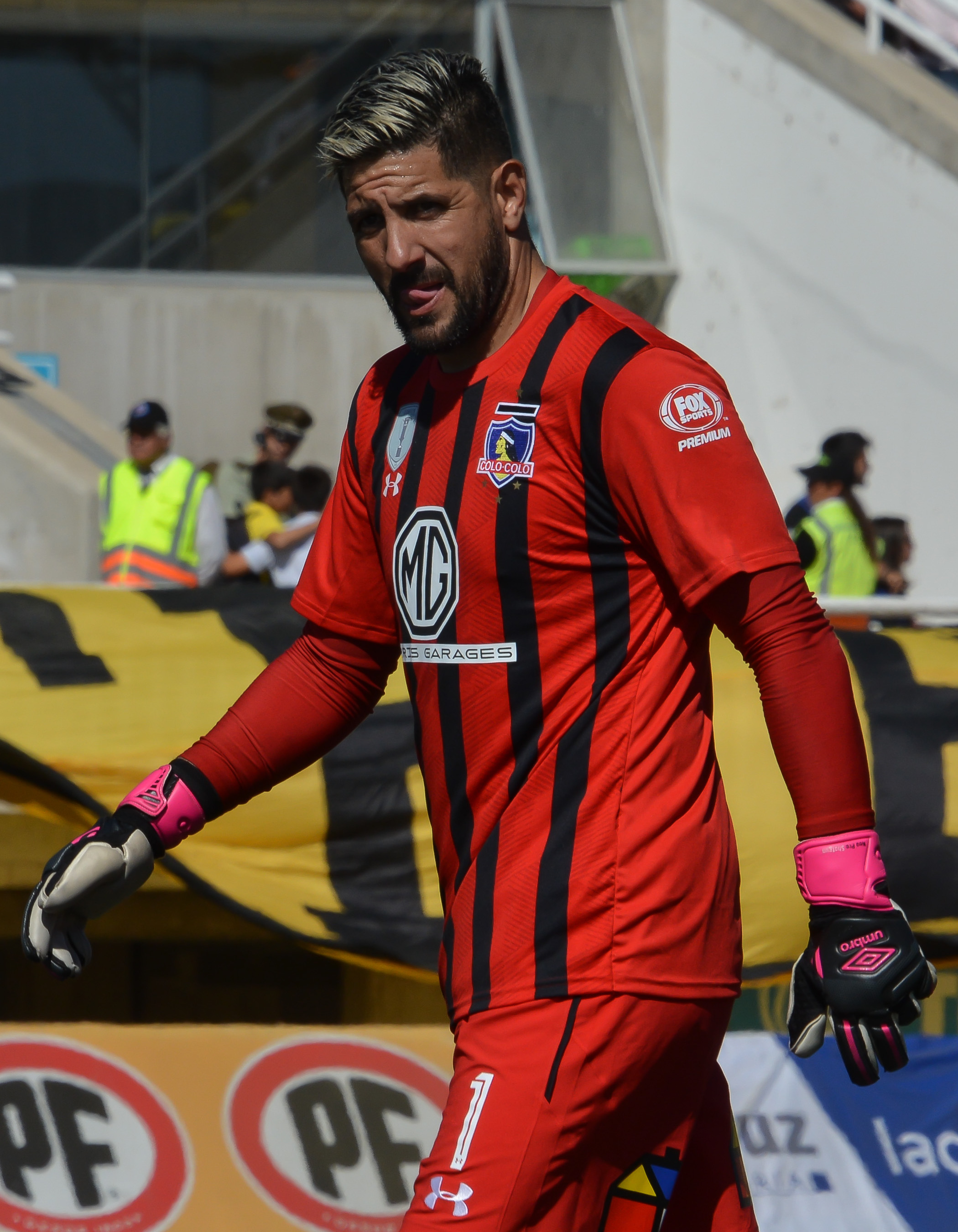
- Orión with Colo-Colo in 2018

Personal information
- Full name: Agustín Ignacio Orión
- Date of birth: 26 June 1981 (age 45)
- Place of birth: Ramos Mejía, Argentina
- Height: 1.87 m (6 ft 2 in)
- Position: Goalkeeper

Youth career
- 2002: San Lorenzo

Senior career*
Years	Team	Apps	(Gls)
2002–2009	San Lorenzo	126	(0)
2009–2011	Estudiantes LP	73	(0)
2011–2016	Boca Juniors	203	(0)
2016–2017	Racing Club	26	(0)
2017–2019	Colo-Colo	43	(0)
Total		471	(0)

International career
2011–2014	Argentina	3	(0)
Medal record
Argentina
FIFA World Cup
Runner-up	2014 Brazil	Team
- * Club domestic league appearances and goals as of 29 December 2018

Agustín Ignacio Orión (Spanish pronunciation: [aɣusˈtin oˈɾjon]; born 26 June 1981) is an Argentine former professional footballer who played as a goalkeeper. He was capped three times for Argentina.

== Club career ==
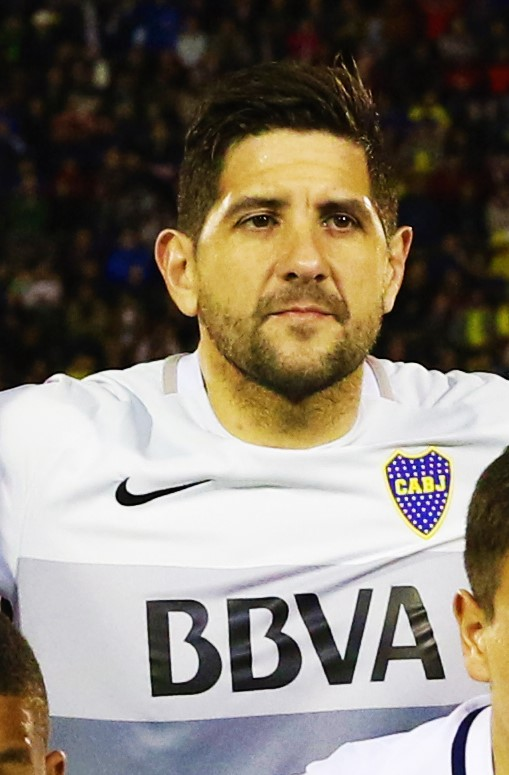
Orion with Boca Juniors in Copa Libertadores 2016

Orion was San Lorenzo's first choice goalkeeper in 2007, when he helped the club to win the Clausura tournament.

On 9 December 2009, the goalkeeper left San Lorenzo for 500 thousand euros and joined Estudiantes de La Plata.

In July 2011 Orion signed with Boca Juniors, where he won the 2011 Apertura. In 2013, Agustín received offers from important European clubs, but he decided to stay in Boca Juniors, because he is an important piece in the team and he loves the club.

In August 2016 Orion signed with Racing Club.

== International career ==
Orion was called up to the Argentina national football team as third goalkeeper behind Roberto Abbondanzieri and Juan Pablo Carrizo for the 2007 Copa América held in Venezuela.

He made his debut for the Albiceleste against Brazil in the Superclásico de las Américas in September 2011.

In June 2014, Orion was named in Argentina's squad for the 2014 FIFA World Cup.

=== International appearances ===
#	Date	Venue	Opponent	Final score	Result	Competition
1.	14 September 2011	Córdoba, Argentina	Brazil	0–0	Draw	2011 Roca Cup
2.	28 September 2011	Belém, Brazil	Brazil	2–0	Lost	2011 Roca Cup
3.	21 November 2012	Buenos Aires, Argentina	Brazil	2–1	Won	2012 Superclásico de las Américas

== Honours ==
=== Club ===
San Lorenzo

- Primera División: 2007 Clausura

Estudiantes de La Plata

- Primera División: 2010 Apertura

Boca Juniors

- Primera División: 2011 Apertura, 2015 Argentine Primera División
- Copa Argentina: 2011–12, 2015

Colo-Colo

- Primera División: Transición 2017
- Supercopa de Chile: 2017 Supercopa de Chile, 2018 Supercopa de Chile

=== International ===
Argentina

- FIFA World Cup runner-up: 2014
- Copa America runner-up: 2007

=== Individual ===
- Ubaldo Fillol Award: 2011 Apertura (with Boca Juniors)
