= Pablo Pérez (footballer, born 1985) =

Argentine footballer

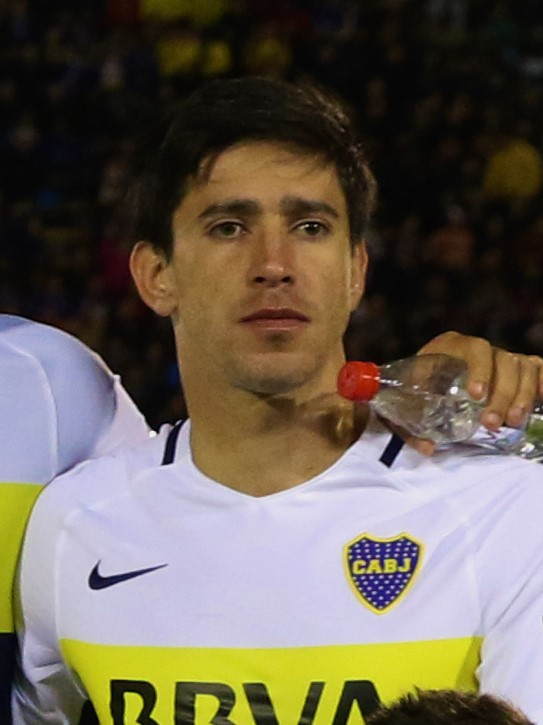
- Pérez with Boca Juniors in 2016

Personal information
- Full name: Pablo Javier Pérez
- Date of birth: 10 August 1985 (age 41)
- Place of birth: Rosario, Argentina
- Height: 1.77 m (5 ft 10 in)
- Position: Midfielder

Youth career
- Newell's Old Boys

Senior career*
Years	Team	Apps	(Gls)
2006–2014	Newell's Old Boys	124	(19)
2009–2010	→ Emelec (loan)	14	(1)
2010–2011	→ Unión Santa Fe (loan)	31	(3)
2014–2015	Málaga	11	(1)
2015	→ Boca Juniors (loan)	14	(2)
2015–2018	Boca Juniors	66	(5)
2019–2020	→ Independiente (loan)	23	(2)
2020–2024	Newell's Old Boys	79	(5)
2024	Sarmiento	3	(0)
Total		365	(38)

International career
2018	Argentina	1	(0)
- * Club domestic league appearances and goals

Pablo Javier Pérez (born 10 August 1985) is an Argentine former professional footballer who played as a midfielder.

== Club career ==
=== Newell's Old Boys and loans ===
Born in Rosario, Pérez graduated from Newell's Old Boys' youth setup, and made his professional debut on 2 December 2006, in a 2–2 draw with Godoy Cruz. On 26 May of the following year, he scored his first goals as a professional, netting a hat-trick in a 4–4 draw with Estudiantes.

On 31 July 2009 Pérez moved abroad for the first time in his career, joining Ecuadorian Serie A side Emelec on loan until the end of the season. During his spell, he scored a goal from the midfield on 17 September, the last of a 4–0 home success against ESPOLI.

On 12 July 2010 Pérez moved to Unión de Santa Fe also in a temporary deal. After appearing in 31 matches and scoring three goals during his only season, he returned to Newell's in June 2011.

Pérez scored eight goals in his return campaign, and appeared regularly in the following two seasons, also being a part of the squad which won the 2013 Torneo Final. He also appeared in 2013 Copa Libertadores, but missed his side's last game due to suspension.

=== Málaga ===
On 8 January 2014, Pérez joined La Liga side Málaga CF on a three-and-a-half-year deal. He made his debut in the competition on the 17th, replacing Samu in a 0–0 home draw against Valencia CF.

Pérez scored his first goal for the Andalusians on 25 March 2014, but in a 1–2 home loss against RCD Espanyol.

=== Boca Juniors and Independiente loan ===
On 9 December 2014, Pérez was loaned to Boca Juniors back in his homeland for 18 months, with a buyout clause. The following 1 September, he was bought outright and signed a deal until 2019.

During the 2018 Copa Libertadores, Pérez acted as team captain as his side reached the finals, losing it to rivals River Plate.

In January 2019, he joined Independiente on loan. After an unsuccessful season and disagreements with the club, in February 2020, he left the club.

=== Newell's Old Boys and Sarmiento ===
On 6 February 2020, Pérez returned again to his first club Newell's Old Boys. After four seasons at the club, he was released on 16 January 2024 and joining Sarmiento until December 2024.

On 15 February 2024, Pérez returned to Newell's Old Boy to play a friendly match against Inter Miami CF, a clause included in his contract when he joined the club. He played the match at the DRV PNK Stadium in Fort Lauderdale, in a 1–1 tie, against the MLS club.

On 23 February 2024, he announced his retirement from professional football.

== International career ==
Pérez was called up by Argentina manager Jorge Sampaoli on 12 March 2018, for two friendlies against Italy and Spain. He made full international debut on 27 March, coming on as a second-half substitute for Éver Banega in a 6–1 loss against the latter at the Wanda Metropolitano in Madrid.

In May 2018, Pérez was named in Argentina's preliminary 35-man squad for the 2018 FIFA World Cup in Russia but did not make the final cut.

== Career statistics ==
=== Club ===
As of 5 August 2024

Club	Season	League			Cup		Continental		Other		Total	
Club	Season	Division	Apps	Goals	Apps	Goals	Apps	Goals	Apps	Goals	Apps	Goals
Newell's Old Boys	2006–07	Primera División	12	3	—		—		—		12	3
Newell's Old Boys	2007–08	Primera División	25	0	—		—		—		25	0
Newell's Old Boys	2008–09	Primera División	8	0	—		—		—		8	0
Newell's Old Boys	2011–12	Primera División	33	8	—		—		—		33	8
Newell's Old Boys	2012–13	Primera División	30	4	0	0	11 (Note: Appearance(s) in Copa Libertadores)	1	—		41	5
Newell's Old Boys	2013–14	Primera División	16	4	—		—		—		16	4
Newell's Old Boys	Subtotal		124	19	0	0	11	1	—		135	20
Emelec (loan)	2009	Serie A	12	1	—		3 (Note: Appearance(s) in Copa Sudamericana)	0	—		15	1
Emelec (loan)	2010	Serie A	2	0	—		4	1	—		6	1
Emelec (loan)	Subtotal		14	1	—		7	1	—		21	2
Unión Santa Fe (loan)	2010–11	Primera B Nacional	31	3	—		—		—		31	3
Málaga	2013–14	La Liga	11	1	—		—		—		11	1
Málaga	2014–15	La Liga	0	0	0	0	—		—		0	0
Málaga	Subtotal		11	1	0	0	—		—		11	1
Boca Juniors	2015	Primera División	17	2	4	1	4	0	1 (Note: Appearance(s) in Liguilla Pre Libertadores)	0	26	3
Boca Juniors	2016	Primera División	10	0	1	1	8	1	1 (Note: Appearance(s) in Supercopa Argentina)	0	20	2
Boca Juniors	2016–17	Primera División	28	0	3	0	2	1	—		33	1
Boca Juniors	2017–18	Primera División	19	5	3	1	5	0	1	0	28	6
Boca Juniors	2018–19	Primera División	6	0	3	2	8	1	—		17	3
Boca Juniors	Subtotal		80	7	14	5	27	3	3	0	124	15
Independiente (loan)	2018–19	Primera División	9	2	3	0	—		—		12	2
Independiente (loan)	2019–20	Primera División	14	0	0	0	7	0	2 (Note: Appearances in Copa de la Liga)	2	23	2
Independiente (loan)	Subtotal		23	2	3	0	7	0	2	2	35	4
Newell's Old Boys	2019–20	Primera División	3	1	—		—		—		3	1
Newell's Old Boys	2020–21	Primera División	10	0	2	0	—		—		12	0
Newell's Old Boys	2021	Primera División	22	1	—		4	0	—		26	1
Newell's Old Boys	2022	Primera División	25	3	0	0	—		—		25	3
Newell's Old Boys	2023	Primera División	19	0	1	0	3	0	—		23	0
Newell's Old Boys	Subtotal		79	5	3	0	7	0	—		89	5
Sarmiento	2024	Primera División	3	0	—		—		—		3	0
Total			365	38	20	5	59	5	5	2	449	50

=== International ===
As of 7 January 2019

Argentina
Year	Apps	Goals
2018	1	0
Total	1	0

== Honours ==
Newell's Old Boys

- Primera División: 2013 Final

Boca Juniors

- Primera División: 2015, 2016–17
- Copa Argentina: 2014–15
