= Marcelo Meli =

Argentine footballer

Personal information
- Full name: César Marcelo Meli
- Date of birth: 20 June 1992 (age 34)
- Place of birth: Salto, Argentina
- Height: 1.74 m (5 ft 8 1/2 in)
- Position: Midfielder

Team information
- Current team: Deportivo Madryn

Youth career
- Club Sports Salto

Senior career*
Years	Team	Apps	(Gls)
2012–2014	Colón	33	(1)
2014–2017	Boca Juniors	42	(4)
2016	→ Sporting CP (loan)	0	(0)
2017–2021	Racing	24	(0)
2018	→ Vitória (loan)	9	(0)
2019	→ Belgrano (loan)	10	(1)
2019–2020	→ Central Córdoba (loan)	17	(1)
2020–2021	→ Hapoel Be'er Sheva (loan)	31	(1)
2022	Aldosivi	29	(2)
2023–2024	Liverpool	38	(2)
2024–2025	Emelec	44	(1)
2025–2026	Santa Fe	11	(0)
2026–	Deportivo Madryn	1	(0)
- * Club domestic league appearances and goals as of 20 March 2026

César Marcelo Meli (born 20 June 1992) is an Argentine professional footballer who plays as a midfielder for Primera Nacional club Deportivo Madryn.

== Club career ==
In 2011, Meli started playing in Colón until 2014, when he was transferred to Boca Juniors for $750,000 Argentine pesos.

In July 2016, Meli was sent on loan to Primeira Liga club Sporting CP.

On 6 January 2024, Meli signed a three-year contract with Ecuadorian Serie A club Emelec.

== Career statistics ==
=== Club ===
As of 9 June 2024

Club	Season	League			National Cup		Continental		Other		Total	
Club	Season	Division	Apps	Goals	Apps	Goals	Apps	Goals	Apps	Goals	Apps	Goals
Colón	2012-13	Primera División	5	0	0	0	—		—		5	0
Colón	2013-14	Primera División	28	1	—		—		—		28	1
Colón	Total		33	1	0	0	—		—		33	1
Boca Juniors	2014	Primera División	10	1	—		8 (Note: Appearance(s) in Copa Sudamericana)	0	—		18	1
Boca Juniors	2015	Primera División	22	3	4	0	4 (Note: Appearance(s) in Copa Libertadores)	1	1 (Note: Appearance(s) in Copa Liberatdoes Play-offs)	0	31	4
Boca Juniors	2016	Primera División	10	0	—		10	0	3 (Note: One appearance in Supercopa Argentina, Two appearance in Torneos de Verano)	0	23	0
Boca Juniors	Total		42	4	4	0	22	1	4	0	72	5
Sporting CP (loan)	2016-17	Primeira Liga	0	0	1	0	0	0	1 (Note: Appearance(s) in Taça da Liga)	0	2	0
Racing	2016-17	Primera División	10	0	0	0	4	0	—		14	0
Racing	2017-18	Primera División	14	0	1	0	4	0	1 (Note: appearance(s) in Torneos de Verano)	0	20	0
Racing	2019-20	Primera División	—		0	0	—		—		0	0
Racing	2021	Primera División	0	0	—		—		—		0	0
Racing	Total	Primera División	24	0	1	0	8	0	1	0	34	0
Vitória (loan)	2018	Série A	9	0	—		—		0	0	9	0
Belgrano (loan)	2018-19	Primera División	10	1	1	1	—		2 (Note: Appearance(s) in Copa de la Superliga)	0	13	2
Central Córdoba (loan)	2019-20	Primera División	17	1	4	0	—		1	0	22	1
Hapoel Be'er Sheva (loan)	2020-21	Israeli Premier League	31	1	1	0	5 (Note: Appearance(s) in UEFA Europa League)	0	—		37	1
Aldosivi	2022	Primera División	29	2	1	0	—		—		30	2
Liverpool	2023	Uruguayan Primera División	38	2	—		5	0	—		43	2
Emelec	2024	Ecuadorian Serie A	14	1	—		—		—		14	1
Career Total			247	13	13	1	40	1	9	0	309	15

== Honours ==
Boca Juniors

- Primera División (1): 2015
- Copa Argentina (1): 2014–15
