= Guillermo Sara =

Argentine footballer

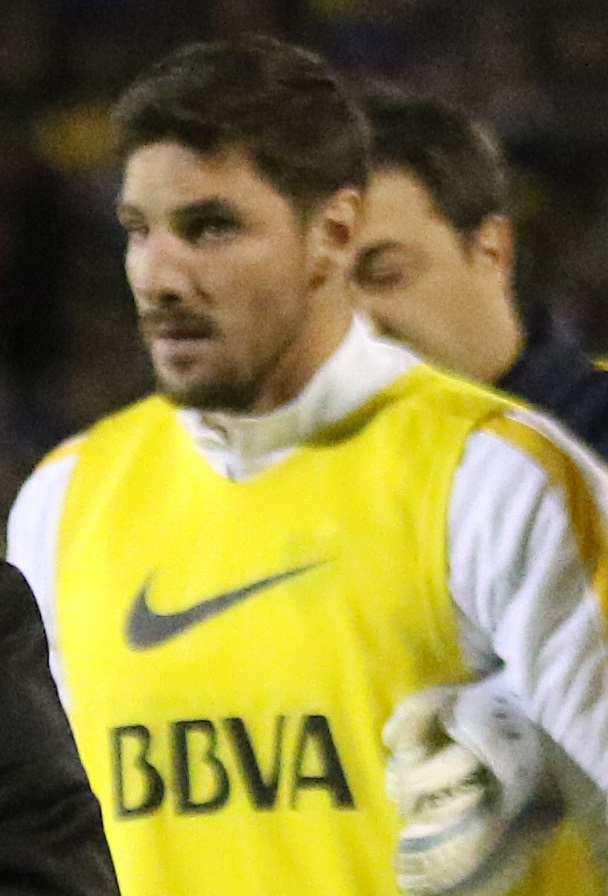
- Guillermo Sara in 2016

Personal information
- Full name: Guillermo Sara
- Date of birth: 30 September 1987 (age 39)
- Place of birth: Santa Fe, Argentina
- Height: 1.82 m (6 ft 0 in)
- Position: Goalkeeper

Youth career
- 1991–2008: Atlético Rafaela

Senior career*
Years	Team	Apps	(Gls)
2008–2013	Atlético Rafaela	141	(0)
2013–2014	Real Betis	15	(0)
2015–2018	Boca Juniors	30	(0)
2018–2020	Lanús	5	(0)
2020–2021	Atlético Rafaela	24	(0)

International career
2006	Argentina U20	8	(0)
- * Club domestic league appearances and goals

Guillermo Sara (born 30 September 1987) is a retired Argentine footballer, who played as a goalkeeper.

== Club career ==
Born in Santa Fe, Sara joined Atlético Rafaela's youth setup in 1991, aged four. In 2006, he was promoted to the first-team, but only made his senior debuts on 1 November 2008, starting in a 2–1 away win over Tiro Federal.

On 4 August 2012 Sara became the first Argentine goalkeeper to defend two penalties in one game, both from José Sand in a 1–1 draw against Racing Club.

On 10 July 2013 Sara joined La Liga side Real Betis in a season-long loan deal, with a €1 million buyout clause. He made his division debut on 25 August, starting in a 1–2 home loss to Celta de Vigo.

In 2015, Sara signed with Argentinian club Boca Juniors. On 28 September 2016, Sara saved two penalties against Lanús in the Round of 16 of the Copa Argentina.

On 1 January 2022, Sara announced his retirement from football, after being without contract since 3 August 2021, when he terminated his contract with Atlético de Rafaela.

== Honours ==
Atlético Rafaela

- Primera B Nacional (1): 2010–11

Boca Juniors

- Primera División (2): 2015, 2016–17
- Copa Argentina (1): 2014–15
