= Alexis Rolín =

Uruguayan footballer (born 1989)

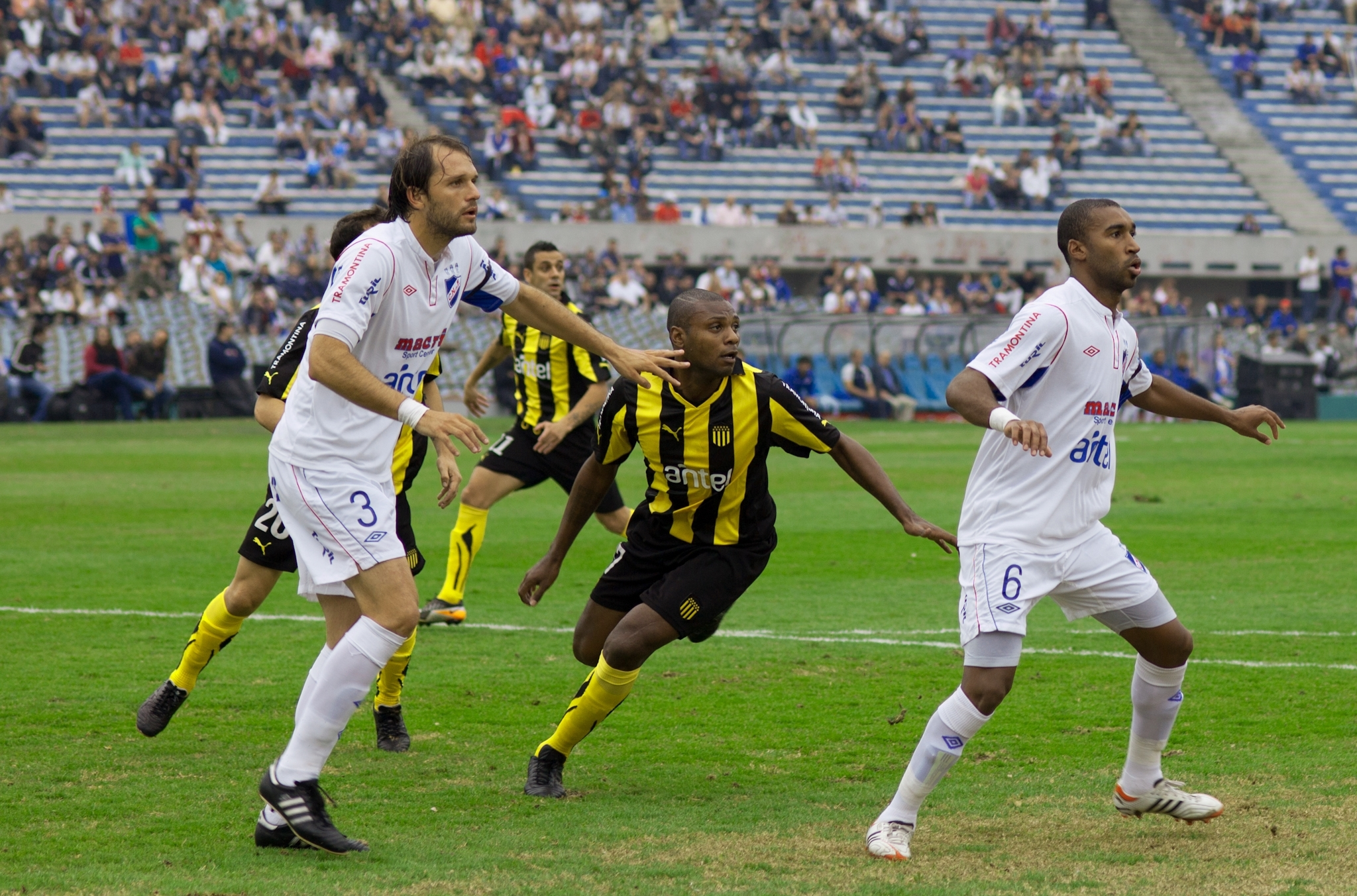

Personal information
- Full name: Germán Alexis Rolín Fernández
- Date of birth: 7 February 1989 (age 37)
- Place of birth: Montevideo, Uruguay
- Height: 1.86 m (6 ft 1 in)
- Position: Centre back

Team information
- Current team: Terremoto

Senior career*
Years	Team	Apps	(Gls)
2011–2012	Nacional	32	(3)
2012–2016	Catania	40	(0)
2015–2016	→ Boca Juniors (loan)	13	(0)
2016–2018	Nacional	21	(2)
2016–2017	→ Olimpia (loan)	13	(0)
2019	Universidad de Concepción	12	(0)
2020–2022	Rentistas	48	(3)
2021	→ Independiente Medellín (loan)	8	(0)
2023	Potencia	14	(0)
2024–	Terremoto		

International career
2012	Uruguay Olympic	3	(0)
- * Club domestic league appearances and goals as of 29 November 2023

Germán Alexis Rolín Fernández (born 7 February 1989) is a Uruguayan footballer who plays as a central defender for Terremoto.

== Club career ==
=== Club Nacional de Football ===
Rolín began his football career with Uruguayan club Nacional. He made his first team debut on 8 May 2011 in a 1–0 win over CA Peñarol. During the 2011–12 season, he was outstanding as defender and many clubs showed interest in him. After two consecutive times finishing as the Champions with Nacional, Rolín joined Italian Serie A club Catania.

=== Calcio Catania ===
On 22 August 2012, Rolín was officially transferred to Calcio Catania. In his debut Serie A campaign, he has served mostly as a back-up to the likes of Nicola Legrottaglie, Nicolas Spolli, and Giuseppe Bellusci, under head coach, Rolando Maran.

Rolín is currently part of a record-breaking Catania outfit that had picked up 56 points from 38 Serie A matches. This performance also saw the club break its record number of home victories in a single season, its record number of victories overall in a single top flight campaign, as well as its record points total in Serie A for the fifth consecutive season.

=== Boca Juniors ===
In January 2015, Rolín officially signed on loan with Argentine club Boca Juniors.

=== Club Olimpia ===
On 26 May 2016, it was announced that Rolín had signed for Olimpia.

== International career ==
He was called up by Óscar Tabárez for the Uruguay Olympic football team that played at the 2012 Summer Olympics being held in London, Great Britain.

== Honours ==
Nacional

- Uruguayan Primera División (2): 2010–11, 2011–12

Boca Juniors

- Argentine Primera División (1): 2015
- Copa Argentina (1): 2014–15
