= Gino Peruzzi =

Argentine footballer (born 1992)

Personal information
- Full name: Gino Peruzzi Lucchetti
- Date of birth: 9 June 1992 (age 34)
- Place of birth: Corral de Bustos, Argentina
- Height: 1.76 m (5 ft 9 in)
- Position: Right-back

Team information
- Current team: San Miguel
- Number: 4

Youth career
- 1998–2006: Atlético Corralense
- 2006–2010: Vélez Sársfield

Senior career*
Years	Team	Apps	(Gls)
2010–2013	Vélez Sársfield	34	(1)
2013–2015	Catania	33	(1)
2015–2018	Boca Juniors	60	(4)
2018	→ Nacional (loan)	11	(0)
2019–2022	San Lorenzo	49	(2)
2022–2024	Alianza Lima	41	(2)
2024	Telavi	16	(1)
2024	Atlético Tucumán	7	(1)
2025–2026	San Miguel	7	(0)
2026–	Atlético Corralense		

International career
2012–2015	Argentina	5	(0)
- * Club domestic league appearances and goals as of 17:00, 17 August 2025 (UTC)

Gino Peruzzi Lucchetti (locally [peˈɾusi]; born 9 June 1992) is an Argentine professional footballer who plays as a right-back for Club Social Atlético Corralense.

== Club career ==
=== Vélez Sársfield ===
Peruzzi started his professional career playing for Vélez Sársfield, making his debut on 27 November 2011, starting in a 1–1 draw with Colón, in the 2011 Apertura. Although he played his first game as a right winger, Peruzzi has since primarily been deployed as a right full back.

Peruzzi gained recognition after his performances against Santos in the home and away legs of the quarter-finals of the 2012 Copa Libertadores, in which Peruzzi marked and annulled Neymar, despite the fact that his team was eliminated in the penalty shootout.

Although he was mainly a substitute for club captain Fabián Cubero, Peruzzi played 13 games (scoring once) in Vélez' 2012 Inicial winning championship, playing either as right back or right winger. He also helped Vélez win the 2012–13 Superfinal, entering the field during the first half after Cubero was sent off.

=== Calcio Catania ===
On 13 August 2013, Calcio Catania officially announced the signing of Peruzzi ahead of the 2013–14 Serie A season. The transfer was reported to be worth 3.4 million euros, plus 700k euros in added taxes. Vélez will also reportedly receive 15% of any future resale of the player.

Peruzzi made his debut for the club on 1 December 2013, in a home defeat against A.C. Milan. In his first season with Catania, the club was relegated to Serie B.

=== Boca Juniors ===
In 2015, Peruzzi signed with Boca Juniors.

=== Nacional ===
On 2 February 2018, Peruzzi joined Uruguayan club Nacional on loan for the remainder of the 2017–18 season.

In February 2024, after two years playing in Peru, Peruzzi joined Georgian Erovnuli Liga side Telavi.

== Club statistics ==
As of 12 July 2016

Club	Season	League		Cup		International		Total	
Club	Season	Apps	Goals	Apps	Goals	Apps	Goals	Apps	Goals
Vélez Sarsfield	2011–12	10	0	2	0	0	0	12	0
Vélez Sarsfield	2012–13	24	1	1	0	4	0	29	1
Total for Vélez Sarsfield		34	1	3	0	4	0	41	1
Catania	2013–14	22	1	1	0	0	0	23	1
Catania	2014–15	11	0	1	0	0	0	12	0
Total for Catania		33	1	2	0	0	0	35	1
Boca Juniors	2015	22	1	6	0	1	0	29	1
Boca Juniors	2016	3	0	1	0	6	0	10	0
Total for Boca Juniors		25	1	7	0	7	0	39	1
Career Total		317	27	20	0	83	5	420	32

== Honours ==
Vélez Sársfield

- Argentine Primera División: 2012 Inicial, 2012–13 Superfinal

Boca Juniors

- Argentine Primera División: 2015, 2016–17
- Copa Argentina: 2015
