= 2020–21 Club Atlético Boca Juniors season =

Boca Juniors
2020 season
- President: Jorge Amor Ameal
- Manager: Miguel Ángel Russo
- Stadium: Estadio Alberto J. Armando
- 2020 Copa de la Liga Profesional: Winners
- 2021 Copa de la Liga Profesional: Semifinal
- 2019–20 Copa Argentina: Winners
- 2020 Copa Libertadores: Semifinal
- 2021 Copa Libertadores: Group stage
Home colours	Away colours

The 2020–21 Club Atlético Boca Juniors season was the 92nd consecutive Primera División season for the senior squad. It was an unusual season, due to the suspension of all competitions in March 2020. The season did not have a Primera Division tournament; instead, the 2020 Copa de la Liga Profesional was played from October 2020 to January 2021, a cup that was conceived as a contingency competition after the schedule for a regular league season had been repeatedly delayed because of the COVID-19 pandemic. The second competition was another national cup, the 2021 Copa de la Liga Profesional, from February to May 2021. Boca Juniors also took part in the Copa Argentina, winning the competition, as well as competing in the group stage and final stages of the 2020 Copa Libertadores, and the group stage of the 2021 Copa Libertadores.

== Season overview ==
=== July ===
Agustín Rossi, Nahuel Molina, Julián Chicco, Franco Cristaldo, Sebastián Pérez, Gonzalo Maroni, Walter Bou, Mateo Retegui and Nazareno Solís returned from their respective loans. Boca and Marcos Díaz agreed to mutually terminate the goalkeeper's contract, Díaz subsequently joined Talleres (C). Boca and Nahuel Molina agreed to mutually terminate the defender's contract, Molina subsequently joined Udinese. Junior Alonso ended his loan with Boca and returned to his club.

=== August ===
Jan Hurtado is loaned to Brazilian Red Bull Bragantino. Goalkeeper Javier García arrives as a free agent. Boca extended one year the loan of Franco Soldano, loaned from Olympiacos. On August 21, Boca confirms that Edwin Cardona is loaned from Tijuana; also, the club announces that has reached an agreement for the transfer of Emanuel Reynoso to Minnesota United FC.

=== September ===
Franco Cristaldo is loaned to Huracán until December 2021. Nazareno Solís is loaned to OFI until December 2021. Marcelo Weigandt is loaned to Gimnasia y Esgrima (LP) until December 2021. On September 17 Boca won 2-0 Libertad, in the return of Copa Libertadores. Sebastián Pérez is loaned to Boavista until December 2021. On September 24 Boca defeated Independiente Medellín 1–0 in Copa Libertadores. On September 29 Boca drew 0–0 against Libertad in Copa Libertadores.

=== October ===
Iván Marcone is loaned to Elche until December 2021. On October 21 midfielder Diego González arrives to Boca as a free agent. The last team of González was Racing Club. On October 22 Boca beat Caracas 3-0 and ended the group stage of Copa Libertadores in first place. Mateo Retegui is loaned to Talleres (C) until December 2021. On October 31 Boca defeated Lanús 2–1 in the first match of 2020 Copa de la Liga Profesional.

=== November ===
On November 8 Boca defeated Newell's 2–0. Guillermo Fernández was on loan from Cruz Azul, although the club had agreed with the Mexican team a purchase option that expires on December 31, the player communicated that he did not want to continue in Boca. On November 15 Boca lost 1–0 against Talleres (C). On November 20, Boca suffered another defeat, 2–1 against Lanús. On November 29 Boca defeated Newell's 2–0.

=== December ===
In the first leg of Round of 16 of Copa Libertadores Boca defeated Internacional 1–0. Walter Bou is loaned to Defensa y Justicia until December 2021. On December 6, Boca drew 0–0 against Talleres (C) and qualified to Fase Campeón. On December 9, Boca lost 1–0 against Internacional but won 5–4 on penalties, in the quarterfinals the club will play against Racing. On December 12 Boca drew against Arsenal 1-1. On December 16, Boca lost to Racing 1–0 in Copa Libertadores. On December 19, Boca defeated Independiente 2–1. On December 23, Boca defeated Racing 2-0 and advanced to the semifinals of Copa Libertadores, facing Santos of Brazil. On December 27, Boca defeated Huracán 3–0. The first Superclásico of the year against River ended in a 2–2 draw.

=== January ===
Cristian Pavón returned from his loan on LA Galaxy. On January 6, Boca drew 0–0 against Santos in Copa Libertadores semifinals. On January 9, Boca drew 2–2 against Argentinos Juniors and advanced to the final of 2020 Copa de la Liga Profesional. On January 13, Boca lost 3–0 against Santos and was eliminated in the semifinals of 2020 Copa Libertadores. On January 17, Boca won the 2020 Copa de la Liga Profesional after beating Banfield on penalties.

=== February ===
After being loaned on Celta de Vigo, Lucas Olaza is again loaned, until the end of the season, to Real Valladolid. Marcos Rojo arrives from Manchester United as a free player. Gastón Ávila is loaned to Rosario Central. On February 14 Boca drew 2–2 against Gimnasia y Esgrima (LP) in the first match of 2021 Copa de la Liga Profesional. On February 21 Boca defeated Newell's 1–0. On February 28 Boca drew 1–1 against Sarmiento (J).

=== March ===
On March 3 Boca defeated Claypole 2-1 and advanced to the Round of 32 of Copa Argentina. On March 7 Boca defeated Vélez Sarsfield 7–1. On March 14 in the Superclásico against River, Boca drew 1-1. On March 21 Boca lost 2–1 against Talleres (C). On March 24 Boca defeated Defensores de Belgrano 3-0 and advanced to the Round of 16 of Copa Argentina. On March 20 Boca drew 1–1 against Independiente.

=== April ===
On April 3 Boca defeated Defensa y Justicia 2–1. Ramón Ábila is loaned to Minnesota United FC. On April 11 Boca lost 1–0 against Unión. On April 17 Boca defeated Atlético Tucumán 3–1. In the beginning of 2021 Copa Libertadores, Boca defeated The Strongest 1–0. On April 24 defeated Atlético Tucumán 1–0. On April 27 Boca defeated Brazilian Santos 2–0.

=== May ===
On May 2 Boca defeated Lanús 1-0 and qualified to the final stages of 2021 Copa de la Liga Profesional. On May 4 Boca lost 1–0 against Ecuadorian Barcelona in Copa Libertadores. On May 8 an alternative Boca lost 1–0 against Patronato. On May 11 Boca lost 1–0 against Brazilian Santos in Copa Libertadores. The Superclásico against River on may 16 ended 1-1 and Boca won 4–2 on penalties. On May 20 Boca drew 0–0 against Ecuadorian Barcelona in Copa Libertadores. The semifinals of Copa de la Liga Profesional 2021 are momentarily suspended because of COVID-19. On May 26 Boca defeated 3–0 against Bolivian The Strongest and qualified to the final stages of 2021 Copa Libertadores. On May 31 Boca was defeated 4–2 on penalties after a 1–1 draw against Racing, ending the participation in 2021 Copa de la Liga Profesional.

== Squad ==
Last updated on May 31, 2021.

Squad no.	Name	Nationality	Position	Date of birth (age)	Apps	Goals	Last team	Note
Goalkeepers
1	Esteban Andrada	(Argentina)	GK	January 26, 1991 (age 35)	93	-54	(Argentina) Lanús	
13	Javier García	(Argentina)	GK	January 29, 1987 (age 39)	47	-57	(Argentina) Racing	
17	Agustín Rossi	(Argentina)	GK	August 21, 1995 (age 31)	78	-60	(Argentina) Lanús	
Defenders
2	Lisandro López	(Argentina)	DF	September 1, 1989 (age 37)	67	8	(Portugal) Benfica	
3	Emmanuel Mas	(Argentina)	DF	January 15, 1989 (age 37)	79	5	(Turkey) Trabzonspor	
4	Julio Buffarini	(Argentina)	DF	August 18, 1988 (age 38)	107	2	(Brazil) São Paulo	
5	Carlos Zambrano	(Peru)	DF	July 10, 1989 (age 37)	26	1	(Ukraine) Dynamo Kyiv	
6	Marcos Rojo	(Argentina)	DF	March 20, 1990 (age 36)	9	0	(England) Manchester United	
18	Frank Fabra	(Colombia)	DF	February 22, 1991 (age 35)	119	9	(Colombia) Independiente Medellín	
24	Carlos Izquierdoz (VC 2º)	(Argentina)	DF	November 3, 1988 (age 37)	101	6	(Mexico) Santos Laguna	
29	Leonardo Jara	(Argentina)	DF	May 20, 1991 (age 35)	108	2	(United States) D.C. United	
35	Renzo Giampaoli	(Argentina)	DF	January 7, 2000 (age 26)	1	0	(Argentina) Youth team	
37	Agustín Sández	(Argentina)	DF	January 16, 2001 (age 25)	3	0	(Argentina) Youth team	
39	Nicolás Valentini	(Argentina)	DF	April 6, 2001 (age 25)	1	0	(Argentina) Youth team	
Midfielders
8	Edwin Cardona	(Colombia)	MF	December 8, 1992 (age 33)	76	17	(Mexico) Tijuana	
11	Eduardo Salvio	(Argentina)	MF	July 13, 1990 (age 36)	44	14	(Portugal) Benfica	Injured
14	Nicolás Capaldo	(Argentina)	MF	September 14, 1998 (age 28)	65	0	(Argentina) Youth team	
20	Gonzalo Maroni	(Argentina)	MF	March 18, 1999 (age 27)	33	5	(Italy) Sampdoria	
21	Jorman Campuzano	(Colombia)	MF	April 30, 1996 (age 30)	62	2	(Colombia) Atlético Nacional	
23	Diego González	(Argentina)	MF	February 9, 1988 (age 38)	11	1	(Argentina) Racing Club	
26	Ezequiel Fernández	(Argentina)	MF	July 25, 2002 (age 24)	1	0	(Argentina) Youth team	
32	Agustín Almendra	(Argentina)	MF	February 11, 2000 (age 26)	49	3	(Argentina) Youth team	
33	Alan Varela	(Argentina)	MF	July 4, 2001 (age 25)	23	0	(Argentina) Youth team	
36	Cristian Medina	(Argentina)	MF	June 1, 2002 (age 24)	20	1	(Argentina) Youth team	
Forwards
10	Carlos Tevez (C)	(Argentina)	FW	February 5, 1984 (age 42)	279	94	(China) Shanghai Shenhua	
19	Mauro Zárate	(Argentina)	FW	March 18, 1987 (age 39)	85	21	(England) Watford	
22	Sebastián Villa	(Colombia)	FW	May 19, 1996 (age 30)	96	15	(Colombia) Deportes Tolima	
27	Franco Soldano	(Argentina)	FW	September 14, 1994 (age 32)	51	5	(Greece) Olympiacos	
30	Exequiel Zeballos	(Argentina)	FW	April 24, 2002 (age 24)	9	0	(Argentina) Youth team	
31	Cristian Pavón	(Argentina)	FW	January 21, 1996 (age 30)	137	32	(United States) LA Galaxy	
34	Agustín Obando	(Argentina)	FW	March 11, 2000 (age 26)	40	1	(Argentina) Youth team	
38	Luis Vazquez	(Argentina)	FW	January 14, 2001 (age 25)	5	0	(Argentina) Youth team	

== Transfers ==
=== Winter ===
==== In ====
Players transferred
Pos.	Name	Club	Fee
GK	(Argentina) Javier García	(Argentina) Racing Club	Free
MF	(Argentina) Diego González	(Argentina) Racing Club	Free

Players loaned
Pos.	Name	Club	End date
MF	(Colombia) Edwin Cardona	(Mexico) Tijuana	December 2021
FW	(Argentina) Franco Soldano	(Greece) Olympiacos	June 2021

Loan Return
Pos.	Name	Return from
GK	(Argentina) Agustín Rossi	(Argentina) Lanús
DF	(Argentina) Nahuel Molina	(Argentina) Rosario Central
MF	(Argentina) Julián Chicco	(Argentina) Patronato
MF	(Argentina) Franco Cristaldo	(Argentina) Central Córdoba (SdE)
MF	(Argentina) Gonzalo Maroni	(Italy) Sampdoria
MF	(Colombia) Sebastián Pérez	(Ecuador) Barcelona SC
FW	(Argentina) Walter Bou	(Argentina) Unión
FW	(Argentina) Mateo Retegui	(Argentina) Estudiantes
FW	(Argentina) Nazareno Solís	(Argentina) Aldosivi

==== Out ====
Players transferred
Pos.	Name	Club	Fee
GK	(Argentina) Marcos Díaz	(Argentina) Talleres (C)	Free
DF	(Argentina) Nahuel Molina	(Italy) Udinese	Free
MF	(Argentina) Emanuel Reynoso	(United States) Minnesota United FC	$5M

Players loaned
Pos.	Name	Club	End date
DF	(Argentina) Marcelo Weigandt	(Argentina) Gimnasia y Esgrima (LP)	December 2021
MF	(Argentina) Franco Cristaldo	(Argentina) Huracán	December 2021
MF	(Argentina) Iván Marcone	(Spain) Elche	December 2021
MF	(Colombia) Sebastián Pérez	(Portugal) Boavista	December 2021
FW	(Argentina) Walter Bou	(Argentina) Defensa y Justicia	December 2021
FW	(Venezuela) Jan Hurtado	(Brazil) Red Bull Bragantino	June 2021
FW	(Argentina) Mateo Retegui	(Argentina) Talleres (C)	December 2021
FW	(Argentina) Nazareno Solís	(Greece) OFI	December 2021

Loan return
Pos.	Name	Return to
DF	(Paraguay) Junior Alonso	(France) Lille

=== Summer ===
==== In ====
Players transferred
Pos.	Name	Club	Fee
DF	(Argentina) Marcos Rojo	(England) Manchester United	Free

Players loaned
Pos.	Name	Club	End date

Loan return
Pos.	Name	Return from
DF	(Uruguay) Lucas Olaza	(Spain) Celta de Vigo
FW	(Argentina) Cristian Pavón	(United States) LA Galaxy

==== Out ====
Players transferred
Pos.	Name	Club	Fee

Players loaned
Pos.	Name	Club	End date
DF	(Argentina) Gastón Ávila	(Argentina) Rosario Central	December 2021
DF	(Uruguay) Lucas Olaza	(Spain) Real Valladolid	June 2021
FW	(Argentina) Ramón Ábila	(United States) Minnesota United FC	December 2021

Loan return
Pos.	Name	Return to
MF	(Argentina) Guillermo Fernández	(Mexico) Cruz Azul

== Competitions ==
=== Overall ===
Competition	First match	Last match	Starting round	Final position	Record							
Competition	First match	Last match	Starting round	Final position	Pld	W	D	L	GF	GA	GD	Win %
2020 Copa de la Liga Profesional	30 October 2020	17 January 2021	Group stage	Winners	12	5	5	2	18	11	+7	41.67
2021 Copa de la Liga Profesional	14 February 2021	31 May 2021	Group stage	Semi-finals	15	6	6	3	23	13	+10	40.00
2019–20 Copa Argentina	3 March 2021	24 March 2021	Round of 64	Round of 16^{1}	2	2	0	0	5	1	+4	100.00
2020 Copa Libertadores	17 September 2020	13 January 2021	Group stage^{2}	Semifinals	10	5	2	3	9	5	+4	50.00
2021 Copa Libertadores	21 April 2021	26 May 2021	Group stage	Round of 16^{3}	6	3	1	2	6	2	+4	50.00
Total					45	21	14	10	61	32	+29	46.67

Last updated: May 31, 2021.
Source: Competitions

1: The Round of 16 will be played in the next season. 2: Two games of the group stage were played in the previous season, that was suspended due to the COVID-19 pandemic, and resumed on 15 September 2020, with the final rescheduled to be played in late January 2021. 3: The final stages will be played in the next season.

=== Copa de la Liga Profesional 2020 ===
==== Group stage ====
===== Zone 4 =====
Pos	Team	Pld	W	D	L	GF	GA	GD	Pts	Qualification	BOC	TAL	NOB	LAN
1	Boca Juniors	6	3	1	2	7	4	+3	10	Advance to Fase Campeón		0–1	2–0	1–2
2	Talleres (C)	6	2	3	1	6	4	+2	9	Advance to Fase Campeón	0–0		3–1	1–1
3	Newell's Old Boys	6	2	1	3	9	11	−2	7	Advance to Fase Complementación	0–2	1–1		3–1
4	Lanús	6	2	1	3	8	11	−3	7	Advance to Fase Complementación	1–2	1–0	2–4	

Source: AFA
Legend: Blue = home team win; Yellow = draw; Red = away team win.

====== Matches ======
Win Draw Loss Postponed

31 October 2020 1	Lanús	1–2	Boca Juniors	Lanús
21:15 UTC−3	Thaller (yellow card) 17'; Sand 23'; Burdisso (yellow card) 31'	Report	Tevez 18'; Zambrano (yellow card) 45+2'; Ábila 55'; Capaldo (yellow card) 70'; Campuzano (yellow card) 72'	Stadium: Ciudad de Lanús; Referee: Fernando Rapallini

8 November 2020 2	Newell's Old Boys	0–2	Boca Juniors	Rosario
21:15 UTC−3	Pérez (yellow card) 54'; Rodríguez (yellow card) 55'; Gentiletti (yellow card) 80'; Guanini (yellow card) 90+4'	Report	Tevez 40'; López 75'; Buffarini (yellow card) 90+2'	Stadium: Marcelo Bielsa; Referee: Mauro Vigliano

15 November 2020 3	Boca Juniors	0–1	Talleres (C)	Buenos Aires
21:15 UTC−3	Tevez (yellow card) 0'; Jara (yellow card) 57'; Obando (red card) 90+2'; Ábila (yellow card) 90+2'; Izquierdoz (red card) 90+3'	Report	Parede (yellow card) 79'; Soñora 86' (yellow card) 86'; Komar (yellow card) 89'	Stadium: La Bombonera; Referee: Germán Delfino

20 November 2020 4	Boca Juniors	1–2	Lanús	Buenos Aires
19:20 UTC−3	López (yellow card) 51'; Zárate (yellow card) 51'; Villa (yellow card) 54'; Jara (yellow card) 69'; Capaldo (yellow card) 70'; Buffarini (yellow card) 81'; Ábila 85'; Cardona (yellow card) 88'	Report	Orsini 27', 44'; Morales (yellow card) 43'; Belmonte (yellow card) 54'	Stadium: La Bombonera; Referee: Facundo Tello

29 November 2020 5	Boca Juniors	2–0	Newell's Old Boys	Buenos Aires
19:20 UTC−3	Cardona 11', 19'; Villa (yellow card) 35'; Ábila (penalty missed) 52'; Izquierdoz (yellow card) 57'	Report	Gabrielli (yellow card) 21' (yellow-red card) 38'; Fernández (yellow card) 28'; Moreno (yellow card) 71'	Stadium: La Bombonera

6 December 2020 6	Talleres (C)	0–0	Boca Juniors	Córdoba
19:20 UTC−3	Díaz (yellow card) 23'; Komar (yellow card) 62'; Navarro (yellow card) 75'; Valoyes (yellow card) 90+2'	Report	Fabra (yellow card) 16'; Zambrano (yellow card) 22'; Cardona (yellow card) 42'	Stadium: Mario Alberto Kempes; Referee: Fernando Rapallini

==== Fase Campeon ====
===== Zone A =====
Pos	Team	Pld	W	D	L	GF	GA	GD	Pts	Qualification	BOC	RIV	ARG	ARS	IND	HUR
1	Boca Juniors	5	2	3	0	10	6	+4	9	Advance to Fase Campeón Final		2–2		1–1		3–0
2	River Plate	5	2	2	1	8	7	+1	8				1–1	2–1	0–2	
3	Argentinos Juniors	5	2	2	1	5	5	0	8		2–2				0–2	
4	Arsenal	5	2	1	2	7	7	0	7				0–1			1–0
5	Independiente	5	2	0	3	10	9	+1	6		1–2			3–4		
6	Huracán	5	1	0	4	4	10	−6	3			1–3	0–1		3–2	

Source: AFA
Legend: Blue = home team win; Yellow = draw; Red = away team win.

====== Matches ======
Win Draw Loss Postponed

12 December 2020 1	Boca Juniors	1–1	Arsenal	Buenos Aires
19:20 UTC−3	González 29'	Report	Candia (yellow card) 81'; Carabajal (yellow card) 84'; Pons 89'	Stadium: La Bombonera; Referee: Darío Herrera

20 December 2020 2	Independiente	1–2	Boca Juniors	Buenos Aires
19:20 UTC−3	González (yellow card) 6'; Romero 20'; Roa (penalty missed) 43'	Report	Cardona (yellow card) 66' (goal) 90'; Villa (yellow card) 68'; Soldano 82'	Stadium: Libertadores de América; Referee: Mauro Vigliano

27 December 2020 3	Boca Juniors	3–0	Huracán	Buenos Aires
19:20 UTC−3	Ábila 25', 44'; Obando 89'	Report	Arregui (yellow card) 37'	Stadium: La Bombonera; Referee: Ariel Penel

2 January 2021 4	Boca Juniors	2–2	River Plate	Buenos Aires
21:30 UTC−3	Ábila 9'; Buffarini (yellow card) 13'; Campuzano (yellow card) 28' (yellow-red card) 58'; Villa 85' (yellow card) 90+3'; Tevez (yellow card) 90+2'	Report	Carrascal (yellow card) 45+1'; Pérez (yellow card) 61' (yellow-red card) 79'; Girotti 73'; Montiel (yellow card) 74'; Santos Borré 76'	Stadium: La Bombonera; Referee: Fernando Rapallini

9 January 2021 5	Argentinos Juniors	2–2	Boca Juniors	Buenos Aires
21:30 UTC−3	Romero (yellow card) 4'; Sosa 9'; Hauche (yellow card) 29'; Torrén (yellow card) 41'; Vera 87'; Pucheta (yellow card) 90+7'; Ibarra (red card) 90+10'	Report	Zárate 24' (yellow card) 57'; Ábila (penalty missed) 42' 60'; Cardona (yellow card) 81'	Stadium: Diego Armando Maradona; Referee: Fernando Espinoza
Note: The game was interrupted for four minutes due to a blackout.

==== Final ====
17 January 2021	Boca Juniors	1–1 (5–3 p)	Banfield	San Juan
22:10 UTC−3	Buffarini (yellow card) 39'; Cardona 63'; Mas (yellow card) 71' (yellow-red card) 86'; Villa (yellow card) 87'; Salvio (yellow card) 90+5'	Report	Bravo (yellow card) 57'; Lollo 90+5'	Stadium: Estadio San Juan del Bicentenario; Referee: Facundo Tello
	Penalties
	Tevez (penalty scored); Villa (penalty scored); Salvio (penalty scored); Izquierdoz (penalty scored); Buffarini (penalty scored)		(penalty scored) Lollo; (penalty scored) Fontana; (penalty missed) Rodríguez; (penalty scored) Álvarez

=== Copa de la Liga Profesional 2021 ===
==== Group stage ====
===== Zone 2 =====
Pos	Team	Pld	W	D	L	GF	GA	GD	Pts	Qualification
1	Vélez Sarsfield	13	10	1	2	23	13	+10	31	Advance to Quarter-finals
2	Boca Juniors	13	6	4	3	22	12	+10	22	Advance to Quarter-finals
3	Independiente	13	6	2	5	16	10	+6	20	Advance to Quarter-finals
4	Talleres (C)	13	5	5	3	19	16	+3	20	Advance to Quarter-finals
5	Lanús	13	6	1	6	18	18	0	19	
6	Unión	13	4	7	2	12	14	−2	19	
7	Atlético Tucumán	13	5	3	5	24	20	+4	18	
8	Gimnasia y Esgrima (LP)	13	3	6	4	15	20	−5	15	
9	Huracán	13	2	7	4	14	17	−3	13	
10	Patronato	13	4	0	9	12	17	−5	12	
11	Defensa y Justicia	13	3	3	7	15	21	−6	12	
12	Sarmiento (J)	13	2	6	5	10	19	−9	12	
13	Newell's Old Boys	13	2	5	6	14	21	−7	11	

Source: AFA

====== Matches ======
Win Draw Loss Postponed

14 February 2021 1	Boca Juniors	2–2	Gimnasia y Esgrima (LP)	Buenos Aires
19:20 UTC−3	Izquierdoz 41'; Varela (yellow card) 65'; Cardona 84'; Medina (yellow card) 90+1'	Report	Guiffrey 45'; Alemán 63'	Stadium: La Bombonera; Referee: Pablo Echavarría

21 February 2021 2	Newell's Old Boys	0–1	Boca Juniors	Rosario
21:30 UTC−3	Scocco (yellow card) 30'; Rivero (yellow card) 58'; Llano (yellow card) 63'; Capasso (yellow card) 69'	Report	Cardona (yellow card) 30'; Zambrano (yellow card) 39'; Izquierdoz 70'	Stadium: Marcelo Bielsa; Referee: Darío Herrera

28 February 2021 3	Boca Juniors	1–1	Sarmiento (J)	Buenos Aires
21:30 UTC−3	López 68'; Campuzano (yellow card) 70'; Cardona (yellow card) 78'; Medina (yellow card) 81'	Report	Montero (yellow card) 42'; Montoya (yellow card) 63'; Alanís 64'	Stadium: La Bombonera; Referee: Francisco Lamolina

7 March 2021 4	Vélez Sarsfield	1–7	Boca Juniors	Buenos Aires
21:30 UTC−3	Amor (yellow card) 18'; Lucero 25'; Galdames (yellow card) 56'	Report	Capaldo (yellow card) 9'; Cardona 20'; Zambrano (yellow card) 24'; Villa 30', 52'; Maroni 55', 73'; Tevez 61'; Campuzano (yellow card) 69' (goal) 88'	Stadium: José Amalfitani Stadium; Referee: Diego Abal

14 March 2021 5	Boca Juniors	1–1	River Plate	Buenos Aires
18:00 UTC−3	Zambrano (yellow card) 15' (yellow-red card) 68'; Villa 40' (pen.) (yellow card) 72'; Medina (yellow card) 64'; Varela (yellow card) 86'	Report	Palavecino 66'; Casco (yellow card) 71' (yellow-red card) 78'	Stadium: La Bombonera; Referee: Facundo Tello

21 March 2021 6	Boca Juniors	1–2	Talleres (C)	Buenos Aires
21:00 UTC−3	Izquierdoz (yellow card) 21'; Santos 81' (o.g.); Capaldo (yellow card) 82'; López (yellow card) 90+4'	Report	Auzqui 12'; Schott (yellow card) 27'; Martino (yellow card) 84'; Valoyes 90+3'; Soñora (yellow card) 90+4'	Stadium: La Bombonera; Referee: Fernando Rapallini

28 March 2021 7	Independiente	1–1	Boca Juniors	Buenos Aires
21:00 UTC−3	Togni 24' (yellow card) 53'; Messiniti (yellow card) 63'; Blanco (yellow card) 90+1'	Report	Medina (yellow card) 46'; Zambrano 54'; Campuzano (yellow card) 56'; Rojo (yellow card) 59'; Almendra (yellow card) 76'; Izquierdoz (yellow card) 77'; Tevez (yellow card) 89'; Villa (penalty missed) 90+3'	Stadium: Libertadores de América; Referee: Patricio Loustau

3 April 2021 8	Boca Juniors	2–1	Defensa y Justicia	Buenos Aires
18:30 UTC−3	Tevez 18'; Campuzano (yellow card) 21'; Zárate 64' (yellow card) 76'	Report	Bou 7' (yellow card) 82'; Loaiza (yellow card) 73'; Frías (yellow card) 90+3'	Stadium: La Bombonera; Referee: Fernando Echenique

11 April 2021 9	Unión	1–0	Boca Juniors	Santa Fe
18:30 UTC−3	Peñailillo (yellow card) 38' (goal) 49'; García (yellow card) 38'; Cañete (yellow card) 85'	Report	Villa (yellow card) 14'; Campuzano (yellow card) 67'	Stadium: 15 de Abril; Referee: Fernando Espinoza

17 April 2021 10	Boca Juniors	3–1	Atlético Tucumán	Buenos Aires
18:00 UTC−3	Medina 4'; Villa 10'; Soldano 90+4'	Report	Heredia 21'; Mussis (yellow card) 38'; Erbes (yellow card) 53' (yellow-red card) 59'; Osores (yellow card) 81'; Bustos (yellow card) 90'; Ortiz (yellow card) 90+3'	Stadium: La Bombonera; Referee: Jorge Baliño

24 April 2021 11	Huracán	0–2	Boca Juniors	Buenos Aires
18:00 UTC−3	Bonifacio (yellow card) 88'	Report	Buffarini (yellow card) 13'; López (yellow card) 22'; Varela (yellow card) 34'; Soldano 48'; Maroni 90+3'	Stadium: Tomás Adolfo Ducó; Referee: Silvio Trucco

2 May 2021 12	Boca Juniors	1–0	Lanús	Buenos Aires
10:00 UTC−3	Almendra (yellow card) 45'; Medina (yellow card) 51'; Capaldo (yellow card) 67'; Izquierdoz 74'; Soldano (yellow card) 85'; Maroni (yellow card) 88'	Report	Belmonte (yellow card) 72'; López (yellow card) 90+3'	Stadium: La Bombonera; Referee: Facundo Tello

8 May 2021 13	Patronato	1–0	Boca Juniors	Paraná
18:00 UTC−3	Torres 74'; Urribarri (yellow card) 76'	Report	Sández (yellow card) 77'; Valentini (yellow card) 84'	Stadium: Presbítero Bartolomé Grella; Referee: Hernán Mastrángelo

==== Quarterfinals ====
16 May 2021	Boca Juniors	1–1 (4–2 p)	River Plate	Buenos Aires
17:30 UTC−3	Tevez 10'; Fabra (yellow card) 37'; Buffarini (yellow card) 42'; Villa (yellow card) 71'; Cardona (yellow card) 87'	Report	Pérez (yellow card) 12'; Maidana (yellow card) 57'; Álvarez 67'; Martínez (yellow card) 90+2'	Stadium: La Bombonera; Referee: Facundo Tello
	Penalties
	Tevez (penalty scored); Villa (penalty scored); Cardona (penalty missed); Izquierdoz (penalty scored); Buffarini (penalty scored)		(penalty scored) Montiel; (penalty missed) Angileri; (penalty scored) Álvarez; (penalty missed) Ponzio

==== Semifinals ====
31 May 2021	Racing	0–0 (4–2 p)	Boca Juniors	San Juan
15:00 UTC−3	Moreno (yellow card) 2'; Díaz (yellow card) 67'; Piatti (yellow card) 70'; Orbán (yellow card) 85'; Chancalay (yellow card) 90'	Report	Izquierdoz (yellow card) 42'; Fabra (yellow card) 48'; Zambrano (yellow card) 51'; Maroni (yellow card) 76'	Stadium: Estadio San Juan del Bicentenario; Referee: Darío Herrera
	Penalties
	Rojas (penalty scored); Melgarejo (penalty scored); Chancalay (penalty scored); Domínguez (penalty missed); Copetti (penalty scored)		(penalty missed) Tevez; (penalty scored) Villa; (penalty missed) González; (penalty scored) Pavón
Note: The match originally scheduled for 23 May 2021 was rescheduled.

=== Copa Argentina ===
==== Round of 64 ====
3 March 2021	Boca Juniors	2–1	Claypole	Lanús
21:30 UTC−3	Varela (yellow card) 18'; Villa 35'; Maroni 76'	Report	Landaburu 29'; Pasquale (yellow card) 45+2'; Ordoñez (yellow card) 64'; Mune (yellow card) 90'	Stadium: Ciudad de Lanús; Referee: Leandro Rey Hilfer

==== Round of 32 ====
24 March 2021	Boca Juniors	3–0	Defensores de Belgrano	La Plata
20:10 UTC−3	Zárate 10' (pen.), 76' (pen.); Rojo (yellow card) 11'; Varela (yellow card) 52'; Mas 62'; Zambrano (yellow card) 65'; Buffarini (yellow card) 74'	Report	Nadal (yellow card) 13'; Álvarez (yellow card) 80'	Stadium: Ciudad de La Plata; Referee: Mauro Vigliano

==== Round of 16 ====
August 4, 2021	Boca Juniors	0–0 (4–1 p)	River Plate	La Plata, Pcia. de Buenos Aires
19:00 UTC−3		Report		Stadium: Ciudad de La Plata; Referee: Patricio Loustau
	Penalties
	Rojo (penalty scored); Ramírez (penalty scored); Pavón (penalty scored); Izquierdoz (penalty scored)		(penalty missed) Álvarez; (penalty missed) Romero; (penalty scored) Martínez

==== Quarterfinals ====
September 22, 2021	Boca Juniors	0–0 (4–2 p)	Patronato	Santiago del Estero, Pcia. de Santiago del Estero
21:30 UTC−3		Report		Stadium: Único Madre de Ciudades; Referee: Pablo Echavarría
	Penalties
	Rojo (penalty scored); Izquierdoz (penalty scored); Molinas (penalty scored); Pavón (penalty scored)		(penalty missed) Sosa Sánchez; (penalty missed) Marín; (penalty scored) Palavecino; (penalty scored) Ibáñez

==== Semifinals ====
November 3, 2021	Boca Juniors	1–0	Argentinos Juniors	Mendoza, Pcia. de Mendoza
21:10 UTC−3	Vázquez 56'	Report		Stadium: Malvinas Argentinas; Referee: Fernando Echenique

==== Final ====
December 8, 2021	Talleres	0–0 (4–5 p)	Boca Juniors	Único Madre de Ciudades, Santiago del Estero
21:10 UTC−3		Report		Referee: Darío Herrera
	Penalties
	Retegui (penalty scored); Fértoli (penalty missed); Méndez (penalty scored); E. Díaz (penalty scored); Santos (penalty scored)		(penalty scored) Rojo; (penalty scored) Izquierdoz; (penalty scored) Pavón; (penalty scored) Sández; (penalty scored) Salvio

=== 2020 Copa Libertadores ===
==== Group stage ====
Pos	Team	Pld	W	D	L	GF	GA	GD	Pts	Qualification	BOC	LIB	CAR	DIM
1	(Argentina) Boca Juniors	6	4	2	0	10	1	+9	14	Round of 16	—	0–0	3–0	3–0
2	(Paraguay) Libertad	6	2	1	3	8	11	−3	7	Round of 16	0–2	—	3–2	2–4
3	(Venezuela) Caracas	6	2	1	3	8	12	−4	7	Copa Sudamericana	1–1	2–1	—	0–2
4	(Colombia) Independiente Medellín	6	2	0	4	9	11	−2	6		0–1	1–2	2–3	—

Source: CONMEBOL

September 17, 2020 3	Libertad (Paraguay)	0–2	(Argentina) Boca Juniors	Asunción, Paraguay
20:00 UTC−4	Mejía (yellow card) 47'; Bareiro (yellow card) 61' (yellow-red card) 86'; Ferreira (yellow card) 75'	Report	Salvio 6', 84'; Campuzano (yellow card) 34'; Mas (yellow card) 76'	Stadium: Estadio General Pablo Rojas; Referee: Rodolpho Toski (Brazil)
Note: On 12 March 2020, CONMEBOL announced that the tournament would be temporarily suspended after group stage matchday 2 due to the COVID-19 pandemic, with matches on matchday 3, originally scheduled for 17–19 March 2020, postponed to a later date.

September 24, 2020 4	Independiente Medellín (Colombia)	0–1	(Argentina) Boca Juniors	Medellín, Colombia
19:00 UTC−5	Rodríguez (yellow card) 26'; Cadavid (yellow card) 37'	Report	Campuzano (yellow card) 32'; Zambrano (yellow card) 38'; Salvio 88'	Stadium: Estadio Atanasio Girardot; Referee: Augusto Aragón (Ecuador)
Note: On 12 March 2020, CONMEBOL announced that the tournament would be temporarily suspended after group stage matchday 2 due to the COVID-19 pandemic, with matches on matchday 3, originally scheduled for 17–19 March 2020, postponed to a later date.

September 29, 2020 5	Boca Juniors (Argentina)	0–0	(Paraguay) Libertad	Buenos Aires, Argentina
21:30 UTC−3	Soldano (yellow card) 14'; Fabra (yellow card) 38'	Report	Bareiro (yellow card) 33'	Stadium: La Bombonera; Referee: Roberto Tobar (Chile)
Note: On 12 March 2020, CONMEBOL announced that the tournament would be temporarily suspended after group stage matchday 2 due to the COVID-19 pandemic, with matches on matchday 3, originally scheduled for 17–19 March 2020, postponed to a later date.

October 22, 2020 6	Boca Juniors (Argentina)	3–0	(Venezuela) Caracas	Buenos Aires, Argentina
21:30 UTC−3	López 27'; Tevez 33', 44'	Report	Hernández (penalty missed) 13'; Villanueva (yellow card) 15'; Blanco (yellow card) 49'	Stadium: La Bombonera; Referee: Christian Ferreyra (Uruguay)
Note: On 12 March 2020, CONMEBOL announced that the tournament would be temporarily suspended after group stage matchday 2 due to the COVID-19 pandemic, with matches on matchday 3, originally scheduled for 17–19 March 2020, postponed to a later date.

==== Final Stages ====
===== Round of 16 =====
December 2, 2020 First leg	Internacional (Brazil)	0–1	(Argentina) Boca Juniors	Porto Alegre, Brazil
21:30 UTC−3	Thiago Galhardo (yellow card) 21'; Patrick (yellow card) 62'; Rodrigo Lindoso (yellow card) 77'	Report	Fabra (yellow card) 42'; Tevez 63' (yellow card) 64'; Salvio (yellow card) 71'; Campuzano (yellow card) 84'; Capaldo (yellow card) 90+4'	Stadium: Estádio Beira-Rio; Referee: Esteban Ostojich (Uruguay)
Note: The two legs of the round of 16 match D, originally scheduled for 25 November and 2 December 2020, 21:30 local time, were rescheduled to 2 and 9 December 2020, 21:30 local time due to the death of Diego Maradona on 25 November 2020 and his link to the club Boca Juniors.

December 9, 2020 Second leg	Boca Juniors (Argentina)	0–1 (1–1 agg.) (5–4 p)	(Brazil) Internacional	Buenos Aires, Argentina
21:30 UTC−3	Obando (red card) 90+4'	Report	Moisés (yellow card) 2'; D'Alessandro (yellow card) 7'; Fabra 48' (o.g.)	Stadium: La Bombonera; Referee: Roberto Tobar (Chile)
	Penalties
	Tevez (penalty scored); Cardona (penalty missed); Salvio (penalty scored); Fabra (penalty scored); Izquierdoz (penalty scored); Jara (penalty scored)		(penalty scored) Rodinei; (penalty scored) Edenílson; (penalty missed) Lindoso; (penalty scored) Yuri Alberto; (penalty scored) Fernández; (penalty missed) Peglow

===== Quarterfinals =====
December 16, 2020 First leg	Racing (Argentina)	1–0	(Argentina) Boca Juniors	Avellaneda, Argentina
21:30 UTC−3	Melgarejo (yellow card) 13' (goal) 60'; Domínguez (yellow card) 89'; Alcaraz (yellow card) 90+2'	Report	Villa (yellow card) 23'; López (yellow card) 80'; Jara (yellow card) 81'	Stadium: Estadio Presidente Juan Domingo Perón; Referee: Esteban Ostojich (Uruguay)

December 23, 2020 Second leg	Boca Juniors (Argentina)	2–0 (2–1 agg.)	(Argentina) Racing	Buenos Aires, Argentina
21:30 UTC−3	Salvio 23'; Villa 61' (pen.); Soldano (yellow card) 90+4'	Report	Alcaraz (yellow card) 90'	Stadium: La Bombonera; Referee: Wilmar Roldán (Colombia)

===== Semifinals =====
January 6, 2021 First leg	Boca Juniors (Argentina)	0–0	(Brazil) Santos	Buenos Aires, Argentina
19:15 UTC−3	Villa (yellow card) 85'	Report		Stadium: La Bombonera; Referee: Roberto Tobar (Chile)

January 13, 2021 Second leg	Santos (Brazil)	3–0 (3–0 agg.)	(Argentina) Boca Juniors	Santos, Brazil
19:15 UTC−3	Diego Pituca 16' (yellow card) 45+4'; Soteldo 49'; Lucas Braga 51'	Report	Salvio (yellow card) 27'; Fabra (red card) 56'; Izquierdoz (yellow card) 66'	Stadium: Estádio Urbano Caldeira; Referee: Wilmar Roldán (Colombia)

=== 2021 Copa Libertadores ===
==== Group stage ====
Pos	Team	Pld	W	D	L	GF	GA	GD	Pts	Qualification	BSC	BOC	SAN	STR
1	(Ecuador) Barcelona	6	4	1	1	10	3	+7	13	Round of 16	—	1–0	3–1	4–0
2	(Argentina) Boca Juniors	6	3	1	2	6	2	+4	10	Round of 16	0–0	—	2–0	3–0
3	(Brazil) Santos	6	2	0	4	8	9	−1	6	Copa Sudamericana	0–2	1–0	—	5–0
4	(Bolivia) The Strongest	6	2	0	4	4	14	−10	6		2–0	0–1	2–1	—

Source: CONMEBOL

April 21, 2021 1	The Strongest (Bolivia)	0–1	(Argentina) Boca Juniors	La Paz, Bolivia
18:00 UTC−4	Wayar (yellow card) 33'; Vaca (yellow card) 60'; Castillo (yellow card) 75'	Report	Villa 7'; Vazquez (yellow card) 90'	Stadium: Estadio Hernando Siles; Referee: Jhon Ospina (Colombia)

April 27, 2021 2	Boca Juniors (Argentina)	2–0	(Brazil) Santos	Buenos Aires, Argentina
21:30 UTC−3	Tevez 47'; Sández (yellow card) 56'; Pavón (yellow card) 60'; Villa 69'; Medina (yellow card) 73'	Report	Vinicius (yellow card) 35'; Pará (yellow card) 40'; Marcos Leonardo (yellow card) 58'; Alison (yellow card) 74'	Stadium: La Bombonera; Referee: Jesús Valenzuela (Venezuela)

May 4, 2021 3	Barcelona (Ecuador)	1–0	(Argentina) Boca Juniors	Guayaquil, Ecuador
19:30 UTC−5	Castillo (yellow card) 33'; Garcés 62'	Report	Varela (yellow card) 30'; López (yellow card) 50'; Tevez (yellow card) 90+4'	Stadium: Estadio Monumental Isidro Romero Carbo; Referee: Andrés Rojas (Colombia)

May 11, 2021 4	Santos (Brazil)	1–0	(Argentina) Boca Juniors	Santos, Brazil
19:15 UTC−3	Ângelo (yellow card) 29'; Jean Mota (yellow card) 34'; Felipe Jonatan 41'; Lucas Braga (yellow card) 67'; Kaio Jorge (yellow card) 72'	Report	Villa (yellow card) 32'; Buffarini (yellow card) 61'	Stadium: Estádio Urbano Caldeira; Referee: Christian Ferreyra (Uruguay)

May 20, 2021 5	Boca Juniors (Argentina)	0–0	(Ecuador) Barcelona	Buenos Aires, Argentina
21:00 UTC−3	Capaldo (yellow card) 37'; Almendra (yellow card) 89'	Report	Pineida (yellow card) 37'; Piñatares (yellow card) 38'	Stadium: La Bombonera; Referee: Wilmar Roldán (Colombia)

May 26, 2021 6	Boca Juniors (Argentina)	3–0	(Bolivia) The Strongest	Buenos Aires, Argentina
21:00 UTC−3	Almendra 3' (yellow card) 20'; Cardona (yellow card) 38'; Villa 44'; Valverde 56' (o.g.)	Report	Mateos (yellow card) 48'	Stadium: La Bombonera; Referee: Roberto Tobar (Chile)

== Team statistics ==
	Total	Home	Away	Neutral
Games played	45	22	19	4
Games won	21	9	10	2
Games drawn	14	9	3	2
Games lost	10	4	6	0
Biggest win	7–1 vs Vélez Sarsfield	3–0 vs Caracas	7–1 vs Vélez Sarsfield	3–0 vs Defensores de Belgrano
Biggest loss	0–3 vs Santos	0–1 vs Talleres (C)	0–3 vs Santos	None
Biggest win (Copa de la Liga Profesional)	7–1 vs Vélez Sarsfield	3–0 vs Huracán	7–1 vs Vélez Sarsfield	None
Biggest win (Copa Argentina)	2–1 vs Claypole	None		3–0 vs Defensores de Belgrano
Biggest win (Copa Libertadores)	3–0 vs Independiente Medellín	3–0 vs Caracas	3–0 vs Independiente Medellín	None
Biggest loss (Copa de la Liga Profesional)	0–1 vs Talleres (C)	0–1 vs Talleres (C)	0–1 vs Unión	None
Biggest loss (Copa Argentina)	None			
Biggest loss (Copa Libertadores)	0–3 vs Santos	0–1 vs Internacional	0–3 vs Santos	None
Clean sheets	20	10	8	2
Goals scored	61	31	24	6
Goals conceded	32	16	14	2
Goal difference	+29	+15	+10	+4
Yellow cards	114	51	50	13
Red cards	6	4	1	1
Top scorer	Villa (10)	Villa (6)	Tevez (4)	Zárate (2)
Penalties for	7	3	2	2
Penalties against	2	1	1	0

=== Season Appearances and goals ===
As of May 31, 2021

No.	Pos	Nat	Player	Total		Copa Prof. 2020		Copa Prof. 2021		Copa Argentina		Copa Libertadores	
No.	Pos	Nat	Player	Apps	Goals	Apps	Goals	Apps	Goals	Apps	Goals	Apps	Goals
Goalkeepers
1	GK	(Argentina) ARG	Esteban Andrada	27	-20	6	-5	9	-10	0	0	12	-5
13	GK	(Argentina) ARG	Javier García	2	-2	0	0	1	-1	1	-1	0	0
17	GK	(Argentina) ARG	Agustín Rossi	16	-8	6	-6	5	-1	1	0	4	-1
Defenders
2	DF	(Argentina) ARG	Lisandro López	27	3	3	1	7+2	1	1	0	14	1
3	DF	(Argentina) ARG	Emmanuel Mas	22	1	8+2	0	0+3	0	2	1	5+2	0
4	DF	(Argentina) ARG	Julio Buffarini	33	0	9+3	0	4+4	0	1	0	7+5	0
5	DF	(Peru) PER	Carlos Zambrano	24	1	10	0	9	1	2	0	3	0
6	DF	(Argentina) ARG	Marcos Rojo	9	0	0	0	5+2	0	1	0	0+1	0
18	DF	(Colombia) COL	Frank Fabra	32	0	4	0	15	0	0+1	0	10+2	0
24	DF	(Argentina) ARG	Carlos Izquierdoz	38	3	7+1	0	13	3	0+1	0	16	0
29	DF	(Argentina) ARG	Leonardo Jara	26	0	5+3	0	1+4	0	0	0	8+5	0
35	DF	(Argentina) ARG	Renzo Giampaoli	1	0	0	0	1	0	0	0	0	0
37	DF	(Argentina) ARG	Agustín Sández	3	0	0	0	0+1	0	0	0	1+1	0
39	DF	(Argentina) ARG	Nicolás Valentini	1	0	0	0	0+1	0	0	0	0	0
Midfielder
8	MF	(Colombia) COL	Edwin Cardona	30	6	8+3	4	6+1	2	1	0	5+6	0
11	MF	(Argentina) ARG	Eduardo Salvio	19	4	3+3	0	2+1	0	0	0	10	4
14	MF	(Argentina) ARG	Nicolás Capaldo	38	0	8+3	0	11+1	0	1	0	8+6	0
20	MF	(Argentina) ARG	Gonzalo Maroni	24	4	3+2	0	5+4	3	1+1	1	2+6	0
21	MF	(Colombia) COL	Jorman Campuzano	29	1	7	0	10+1	1	0+1	0	9+1	0
23	MF	(Argentina) ARG	Diego González	11	1	3+3	1	0+2	0	0	0	3	0
26	MF	(Argentina) ARG	Ezequiel Fernández	1	0	0	0	1	0	0	0	0	0
32	MF	(Argentina) ARG	Agustín Almendra	15	1	0	0	6+3	0	1	0	5	1
33	MF	(Argentina) ARG	Alan Varela	23	0	3+1	0	6+5	0	2	0	5+1	0
36	MF	(Argentina) ARG	Cristian Medina	20	1	0	0	11+2	1	1+1	0	4+1	0
Forwards
10	FW	(Argentina) ARG	Carlos Tevez	33	9	3+3	2	12	3	0	0	13+2	4
19	FW	(Argentina) ARG	Mauro Zárate	20	4	8+1	1	4+4	1	1	2	0+2	0
22	FW	(Colombia) COL	Sebastián Villa	36	10	7+3	1	14	4	1	1	11	4
27	FW	(Argentina) ARG	Franco Soldano	35	3	3+5	1	2+9	2	1+1	0	10+4	0
30	FW	(Argentina) ARG	Exequiel Zeballos	9	0	3+1	0	1+1	0	2	0	0+1	0
31	FW	(Argentina) ARG	Cristian Pavón	9	0	0	0	1+3	0	0	0	4+1	0
34	FW	(Argentina) ARG	Agustín Obando	21	1	2+6	1	2+3	0	1	0	3+4	0
38	FW	(Argentina) ARG	Luis Vázquez	5	0	0+1	0	0+1	0	1	0	0+2	0
Players who have made an appearance or had a squad number this season, but have left the club
20	DF	(Argentina) ARG	Gastón Ávila	4	0	4	0	0	0	0	0	0	0
42	DF	(Argentina) ARG	Marcelo Weigandt	0	0	0	0	0	0	0	0	0	0
7	MF	(Argentina) ARG	Guillermo Fernández	5	0	0+1	0	0	0	0	0	4	0
23	MF	(Argentina) ARG	Iván Marcone	1	0	0	0	0	0	0	0	0+1	0
30	MF	(Argentina) ARG	Emanuel Reynoso	0	0	0	0	0	0	0	0	0	0
6	FW	(Argentina) ARG	Walter Bou	3	0	0	0	0	0	0	0	0+3	0
9	MF	(Argentina) ARG	Ramón Ábila	12	6	8+1	6	0	0	0	0	0+3	0
17	FW	(Venezuela) VEN	Jan Carlos Hurtado	0	0	0	0	0	0	0	0	0	0
38	FW	(Argentina) ARG	Mateo Retegui	0	0	0	0	0	0	0	0	0	0

=== Top scorers ===
As of May 31, 2021

Rank	Pos.	No.	Name	Copa Prof. 2020	Copa Prof. 2021	Copa Argentina	Copa Libertadores	Total
1	FW	22	(Colombia) Sebastián Villa	1	4	1	4	10
2	FW	10	(Argentina) Carlos Tevez	2	3		4	9
3	FW	9	(Argentina) Ramón Ábila	6				6
4	MF	8	(Colombia) Edwin Cardona	4	2			6
5	MF	11	(Argentina) Eduardo Salvio				4	4
6	FW	19	(Argentina) Mauro Zárate	1	1	2		4
7	MF	32	(Argentina) Gonzalo Maroni		3	1		4
8	DF	20	(Argentina) Lisandro López	1	1		1	3
9	FW	27	(Argentina) Franco Soldano	1	2			3
10	DF	24	(Argentina) Carlos Izquierdoz		3			3
11	MF	23	(Argentina) Diego González	1				1
12	FW	34	(Argentina) Agustín Obando	1				1
13	MF	21	(Colombia) Jorman Campuzano		1			1
14	DF	3	(Argentina) Emmanuel Mas			1		1
15	DF	5	(Peru) Carlos Zambrano		1			1
16	MF	36	(Argentina) Cristian Medina		1			1
17	MF	32	(Argentina) Agustín Almendra				1	1
Own goals					1		1	2
Total				18	23	5	15	61

=== Top assists ===
As of May 31, 2021

Rank	Pos.	No.	Name	Copa Prof. 2020	Copa Prof. 2021	Copa Argentina	Copa Libertadores	Total
1	MF	8	(Colombia) Edwin Cardona	4	5	1	2	12
2	DF	18	(Colombia) Frank Fabra		4		2	6
3	FW	10	(Argentina) Carlos Tevez	1	2		1	4
4	FW	22	(Colombia) Sebastián Villa	2			1	3
5	MF	11	(Argentina) Eduardo Salvio	1				1
6	FW	19	(Argentina) Mauro Zárate		1			1
7	FW	9	(Argentina) Ramón Ábila	1				1
8	MF	33	(Argentina) Alan Varela	1				1
9	DF	3	(Argentina) Emmanuel Mas	1				1
10	MF	23	(Argentina) Diego González	1				1
11	FW	34	(Argentina) Agustín Obando			1		1
12	MF	14	(Argentina) Nicolás Capaldo		1			1
13	MF	32	(Argentina) Agustín Almendra				1	1
14	DF	20	(Argentina) Lisandro López				1	1
15	FW	31	(Argentina) Cristian Pavón		1			1
16	MF	36	(Argentina) Cristian Medina		1			1
Total				12	14	2	9	37

=== Penalties ===
Date	Penalty Taker	Scored	Opponent	Competition
29 November 2020	Ramón Ábila	No	Lanús	2020 Copa de la Liga Profesional
23 December 2020	Sebastián Villa	Yes	Racing	2020 Copa Libertadores
9 January 2021	Ramón Ábila	No	Argentinos Juniors	2020 Copa de la Liga Profesional
14 March 2021	Sebastián Villa	Yes	River Plate	2021 Copa de la Liga Profesional
24 March 2021	Mauro Zárate	Yes	Defensores de Belgrano	2019–20 Copa Argentina
24 March 2021	Mauro Zárate	Yes	Defensores de Belgrano	2019–20 Copa Argentina
28 March 2021	Sebastián Villa	No	Independiente	2021 Copa de la Liga Profesional

=== Clean sheets ===
As of May 31, 2021

Rank	Pos.	No.	Name	Copa Prof. 2020	Copa Prof. 2021	Copa Argentina	Copa Libertadores	Total
1	GK	1	(Argentina) Esteban Andrada	3	1		9	13
2	GK	17	(Argentina) Agustín Rossi	1	3	1	2	7
Total				4	4	1	11	20

=== Disciplinary record ===
As of May 31, 2021

No.	Pos	Nat	Name	Copa Prof. 2020			Copa Prof. 2021			Copa Argentina			Copa Libertadores			Total		
No.	Pos	Nat	Name	Booked	(yellow card) (yellow-red card)	Sent off (straight red)	Booked	(yellow card) (yellow-red card)	Sent off (straight red)	Booked	(yellow card) (yellow-red card)	Sent off (straight red)	Booked	(yellow card) (yellow-red card)	Sent off (straight red)	Booked	(yellow card) (yellow-red card)	Sent off (straight red)
Goalkeepers
1	GK	(Argentina)	Esteban Andrada															
13	GK	(Argentina)	Javier García															
17	GK	(Argentina)	Agustín Rossi															
Defenders
2	DF	(Argentina)	Lisandro López	1			2						2			5		
3	DF	(Argentina)	Emmanuel Mas	1	1								1			2	1	
4	DF	(Argentina)	Julio Buffarini	4			1			1			1			7		
5	DF	(Peru)	Carlos Zambrano	2			3	1		1			1			7	1	
6	DF	(Argentina)	Marcos Rojo				1			1						2		
18	DF	(Colombia)	Frank Fabra	1			2						2		1	5		1
24	DF	(Argentina)	Carlos Izquierdoz	1		1	3						1			5		1
29	DF	(Argentina)	Leonardo Jara	2									1			3		
35	DF	(Argentina)	Renzo Giampaoli															
37	DF	(Argentina)	Agustín Sández				1						1			2		
39	DF	(Argentina)	Nicolás Valentini				1									1		
Midfielders
8	MF	(Colombia)	Edwin Cardona	4			3						1			8		
11	MF	(Argentina)	Eduardo Salvio	1									2			3		
14	MF	(Argentina)	Nicolás Capaldo	2			3						2			7		
20	MF	(Argentina)	Gonzalo Maroni				2									'2		
21	MF	(Colombia)	Jorman Campuzano	3	1		5						3			11	1	
23	MF	(Argentina)	Diego González															
26	MF	(Argentina)	Ezequiel Fernández															
32	MF	(Argentina)	Agustín Almendra				2						2			4		
33	MF	(Argentina)	Alan Varela				4			2			1			7		
36	MF	(Argentina)	Cristian Medina				5						1			6		
Forwards
10	FW	(Argentina)	Carlos Tevez	2			1						2			5		
19	FW	(Argentina)	Mauro Zárate	2			1									3		
22	FW	(Colombia)	Sebastián Villa	5			3						3			11		
27	FW	(Argentina)	Franco Soldano				1						2			3		
30	FW	(Argentina)	Exequiel Zeballos															
31	FW	(Argentina)	Cristian Pavón										1			1		
34	FW	(Argentina)	Agustín Obando			1									1			2
38	FW	(Argentina)	Luis Vázquez										1			1		
Players who have made an appearance or had a squad number this season, but have left the club
20	DF	(Argentina)	Gastón Ávila															
42	DF	(Argentina)	Marcelo Weigandt															
7	MF	(Argentina)	Guillermo Fernández															
23	MF	(Argentina)	Iván Marcone															
30	MF	(Argentina)	Emanuel Reynoso															
6	FW	(Argentina)	Walter Bou															
9	FW	(Argentina)	Ramón Ábila	1												1		
17	FW	(Venezuela)	Jan Carlos Hurtado															
38	FW	(Argentina)	Mateo Retegui															
Total				32	2	2	44	1		5			29		2	110	3	4
