= 2019–20 Club Atlético Boca Juniors season =

Boca Juniors
2019–20 season
- President: Daniel Angelici (until 13 December); Jorge Amor Ameal (from 13 December)
- Manager: Gustavo Alfaro (until 30 December); Miguel Ángel Russo (from 30 December)
- Stadium: Estadio Alberto J. Armando
- Primera División: Winners
- Copa de la Superliga: TBD
- 2018–19 Copa Argentina: Round of 32
- 2019 Copa Libertadores: Semi-finals
- 2020 Copa Libertadores: Group stage
Home colours	Away colours

The 2019–20 Club Atlético Boca Juniors season was the 91st consecutive Primera División season for the senior squad. During the season, Boca Juniors took part in the Primera División, Copa de la Superliga, Copa Argentina, Final stages of the 2019 Copa Libertadores and in the Group stage of the 2020 Copa Libertadores.

== Season overview ==
=== June ===
On 19 June Boca announced that Alexis Mac Allister is the first signing of the season, being loaned from Brighton & Hove Albion. Julián Chicco is loaned to Patronato. Gonzalo Maroni and Agustín Rossi returned from their loans in Talleres (C) and Deportes Antofagasta, and are loaned again, to Sampdoria and to Lanús. Talleres (C) made use of the option to purchase Tomás Pochettino permanently. Nicolás Benegas returned from his loan and is transferred to Defensores de Belgrano.

=== July ===
Nicolás Colazo, Franco Cristaldo, Marcelo Torres and Nazareno Solís returned from their loans. Nazareno Solís is loaned to Aldosivi and Franco Cristaldo to Central Córdoba (SdE). On 12 July, Boca and Gimnasia y Esgrima (LP) reached an agreement for the transfer of forward Jan Carlos Hurtado. On 18 July, Boca and Benfica reached an agreement for the transfer of midfielder Eduardo Salvio. The first official match of the season was a 1–0 win against Athletico Paranaense in the Round of 16 of 2019 Copa Libertadores. Italian midfielder Daniele de Rossi is new player of the club, after arriving as a free agent. He played 18 years in Roma and won the world cup with Italy. Boca draw 0–0 against Huracán in the first match of the league tournament. In the second leg of the Round of 16 of Copa Libertadores, Boca beat Athletico Paranaense 2-0 and advanced to the Quarterfinals, facing Ecuadorian team LDU Quito. Nicolás Colazo is loaned to Rosario Central.

=== August ===
On 4 August, Boca defeated Patronato 2–0. On 5 August, Boca and Marseille reached an agreement for the transfer of forward Darío Benedetto, "Pipa" leaves the club after three years, in which he scored 45 goals in 76 matches. On 8 August, forward Cristian Pavón is loaned to LA Galaxy. On 9 August, Boca and Cagliari reached an agreement for the transfer of midfielder Nahitan Nández. On 13 August, forward Franco Soldano is loaned from Olympiacos. Boca is eliminated from 2018–19 Copa Argentina after losing in penaltis against Almagro. On 18 August Boca won Aldosivi 2–0. On 21 August Boca won LDU Quito 3–0 in the first leg of the quarterfinals. On 25 August Boca defeated Banfield 1–0. In the second leg of the Quarterfinals of Copa Libertadores, Boca draw LDU Quito 0-0 and advanced to the Semifinals, facing River Plate, in another edition of Superclásico.

=== September ===
The Primera División Superclásico against River Plate ended in a 0–0 draw. On 15 September Boca won Estudiantes (LP) 1–0. On 21 September Boca won San Lorenzo 2–0. On 18 September Boca draw 1–1 against Newells.

=== October ===
The first leg of the Libertadores semifinals Superclásico ended in a 2–0 defeat against River Plate. On 6 October Boca won Defensa y Justicia 1–0. On 18 October Boca lost the first match of the Superliga, 1–0 against Racing. Boca won 1–0 against River the second leg of the Libertadores semifinals Superclásico but lost 2–1 in the aggregate and is eliminated. On 31 October Boca lost 2–1 against Lanús.

=== November ===
On 3 November Boca won Arsenal 5–1. On 10 November Boca draw 0–0 against Vélez Sarsfield. On 24 November Boca won Unión 2–0. On 30 November Boca draw 1–1 against Argentinos Juniors.

=== November ===
On 8 December Boca lost against Rosario Central 1–0, it was the last match of 2019.

=== December ===
Miguel Ángel Russo is the new head coach of the club, after Gustavo Alfaro ended his contract.

=== January ===
Leonardo Jara and Nahuel Molina returned from their loans. Kevin Mac Allister returned to his club after a loan spell in Boca. On 6 January, Daniele De Rossi announced his retirement from football. On 10 January the new uniforms are presented, with Adidas replacing Nike. On 17 January, midfielder Guillermo Fernández is loaned from Cruz Azul. Boca and Paolo Goltz agreed to mutually terminate the defender's contract, Goltz subsequently joined Gimnasia y Esgrima (LP). On 26 January the first match of the year was a 0–0 draw against Independiente. Brighton & Hove Albion recalls Alexis Mac Allister, interrupting his loan spell with Boca. On 31 January, Boca and Dynamo Kyiv reached an agreement for the transfer of defender Carlos Zambrano.

=== February ===
On 2 February Boca won Talleres (C) 2–1. On 8 February Boca won Atlético Tucumán 2–0. On 16 February Boca won Central Córdoba (SdE) 4–0. On 23 February Boca won Godoy Cruz 3–0. On 28 February Boca won Colón 4–0.

=== March ===
In the beginning of 2020 Copa Libertadores Boca draw Caracas 1-1. In the last match of Superliga Boca won Gimnasia y Esgrima (LP) 1-0 and won the title, the 34 title of Primera Division. On 10 March, in the second game of Copa Libertadores group stage Boca won 3-0 Independiente Medellín. The first match of Copa de la Superliga was a 4–1 victory over Godoy Cruz. On 17 March 2020, AFA announced the suspension of the tournament.

=== April ===
On 28 April 2020 AFA announced the abandonment of the Copa de la Superliga and the culmination of the 2019–20 season in all of its competitions due to the COVID-19 pandemic. CONMEBOL also announced the indefinite suspension of 2020 Copa Libertadores.

== Squad ==
Squad no.	Name	Nationality	Position	Date of birth (age)	Apps	Goals	Signed from	Note
Goalkeepers
1	Esteban Andrada	(Argentina)	GK	26 January 1991 (age 35)	69	-35	(Argentina) Lanús	
12	Marcos Díaz	(Argentina)	GK	5 February 1986 (age 40)	6	-3	(Argentina) Huracán	
28	Manuel Roffo	(Argentina)	GK	4 April 2000 (age 26)	0	0	(Argentina) Academy	
Defenders
3	Emmanuel Mas	(Argentina)	DF	15 January 1989 (age 37)	61	4	(Turkey) Trabzonspor	
4	Julio Buffarini	(Argentina)	DF	18 August 1988 (age 38)	75	2	(Brazil) São Paulo	
5	Carlos Zambrano	(Peru)	DF	10 July 1989 (age 37)	4	0	(Ukraine) Dynamo Kyiv	
15	Leonardo Jara	(Argentina)	DF	20 May 1991 (age 35)	84	2	(United States) D.C. United	
18	Frank Fabra	(Colombia)	DF	22 February 1991 (age 35)	89	9	(Colombia) Independiente Medellín	
20	Lisandro López	(Argentina)	DF	1 September 1989 (age 37)	41	5	(Portugal) Benfica	Injured
24	Carlos Izquierdoz (VC 2º)	(Argentina)	DF	3 November 1988 (age 37)	66	3	(Mexico) Santos Laguna	
32	Gastón Ávila	(Argentina)	DF	30 September 2001 (age 25)	1	0	(Argentina) Academy	
Midfielders
7	Guillermo Fernández	(Argentina)	MF	11 October 1991 (age 35)	45	3	(Mexico) Cruz Azul	
8	Edwin Cardona	(Colombia)	MF	8 December 1992 (age 33)	49	11	(Mexico) Tijuana	
11	Eduardo Salvio	(Argentina)	MF	13 July 1990 (age 36)	28	13	(Portugal) Benfica	
14	Nicolás Capaldo	(Argentina)	MF	14 September 1998 (age 28)	29	0	(Argentina) Academy	
21	Jorman Campuzano	(Colombia)	MF	30 April 1996 (age 30)	36	1	(Colombia) Atlético Nacional	
23	Iván Marcone (VC 4º)	(Argentina)	MF	3 June 1990 (age 36)	46	0	(Mexico) Cruz Azul	
39	Agustín Almendra	(Argentina)	MF	11 February 2000 (age 26)	34	2	(Argentina) Academy	
	Gonzalo Maroni	(Argentina)	MF	18 March 1999 (age 27)	11	1	(Italy) Sampdoria	
Forwards
9	Ramón Ábila (VC 3º)	(Argentina)	FW	14 October 1989 (age 37)	71	30	(Brazil) Cruzeiro	
10	Carlos Tevez (C)	(Argentina)	FW	5 February 1984 (age 42)	249	85	(China) Shanghai Shenhua	
19	Mauro Zárate	(Argentina)	FW	18 March 1987 (age 39)	66	17	(England) Watford	
22	Sebastián Villa	(Colombia)	FW	19 May 1996 (age 30)	60	5	(Colombia) Deportes Tolima	
27	Franco Soldano	(Argentina)	FW	14 September 1994 (age 32)	19	2	(Greece) Olympiacos	
34	Agustín Obando	(Argentina)	FW	11 March 2000 (age 26)	21	0	(Argentina) Academy	
	Walter Bou	(Argentina)	FW	25 August 1993 (age 33)	51	10	(Argentina) Unión	

== Transfers ==
=== Winter ===
==== In ====
Players transferred
Pos.	Name	Club	Fee
MF	(Italy) Daniele De Rossi	(Italy) Roma	Free
MF	(Argentina) Eduardo Salvio	(Portugal) Benfica	€7M
FW	(Venezuela) Jan Carlos Hurtado	(Argentina) Gimnasia y Esgrima (LP)	$5M

Players loaned
Pos.	Name	Club	End date
MF	(Argentina) Alexis Mac Allister	(England) Brighton & Hove Albion	June 2020
FW	(Argentina) Franco Soldano	(Greece) Olympiacos	December 2020

Loan Return
Pos.	Name	Return from
GK	(Argentina) Agustín Rossi	(Chile) Antofagasta
DF	(Argentina) Gonzalo Goñi	(Argentina) Agropecuario
DF	(Argentina) Agustín Heredia	(Argentina) Godoy Cruz
MF	(Argentina) Nicolás Colazo	(Argentina) Tigre
MF	(Argentina) Franco Cristaldo	(Argentina) San Martín (SJ)
MF	(Argentina) Gonzalo Maroni	(Argentina) Talleres (C)
MF	(Argentina) Alexis Messidoro	(Uruguay) Cerro Largo
MF	(Argentina) Tomás Pochettino	(Argentina) Talleres (C)
FW	(Argentina) Nicolás Benegas	(Argentina) Brown
FW	(Argentina) Walter Bou	(Chile) Unión La Calera
FW	(Argentina) Tomás Fernández	(Argentina) Agropecuario
FW	(Argentina) Nazareno Solís	(Argentina) San Martín (SJ)
FW	(Argentina) Marcelo Torres	(Argentina) Banfield
FW	(Argentina) Guido Vadalá	(Chile) Universidad de Concepción

==== Out ====
Players transferred
Pos.	Name	Club	Fee
MF	(United States) George Acosta	(United States) Austin Bold	Free
MF	(Argentina) Nicolás Colazo	(Argentina) Rosario Central	Free
MF	(Argentina) Alexis Messidoro	(Venezuela) Estudiantes (M)	Free
MF	(Uruguay) Nahitan Nández	(Italy) Cagliari	€18M
MF	(Argentina) Tomás Pochettino	(Argentina) Talleres (C)	$900m
FW	(Argentina) Darío Benedetto	(France) Marseille	€14M
FW	(Argentina) Nicolás Benegas	(Argentina) Defensores de Belgrano	Free

Players loaned
Pos.	Name	Club	End date
GK	(Argentina) Agustín Rossi	(Argentina) Lanús	June 2020
DF	(Argentina) Gonzalo Goñi	(Argentina) Estudiantes (BA)	June 2020
DF	(Argentina) Agustín Heredia	(Uruguay) Cerro Largo	June 2020
DF	(Argentina) Isaac Monti	(Argentina) All Boys	June 2020
DF	(Argentina) Oscar Salomón	(Argentina) Central Córdoba (SdE)	June 2020
MF	(Argentina) Julián Chicco	(Argentina) Patronato	June 2020
MF	(Argentina) Franco Cristaldo	(Argentina) Central Córdoba (SdE)	June 2020
MF	(Argentina) Gonzalo Maroni	(Italy) Sampdoria	June 2020
FW	(Argentina) Walter Bou	(Argentina) Unión (SF)	June 2020
FW	(Argentina) Tomás Fernández	(Uruguay) Cerro Largo	June 2020
FW	(Argentina) Cristian Pavón	(United States) LA Galaxy	December 2020
FW	(Argentina) Nazareno Solís	(Argentina) Aldosivi	June 2020
FW	(Argentina) Marcelo Torres	(Cyprus) Pafos	June 2020
FW	(Argentina) Guido Vadalá	(Colombia) Tolima	June 2020

Loan return
Pos.	Name	Return to

=== Summer ===
==== In ====
Players transferred
Pos.	Name	Club	Fee
DF	(Peru) Carlos Zambrano	(Ukraine) Dynamo Kyiv	Undisclosed

Players loaned
Pos.	Name	Club	End date
MF	(Argentina) Guillermo Fernández	(Mexico) Cruz Azul	December 2020

Loan return
Pos.	Name	Return from
GK	(Argentina) Federico Abadía	(Argentina) Talleres (C)
DF	(Argentina) Lucas Arzamendia	(Uruguay) Cerro Largo
DF	(Argentina) Leonardo Jara	(United States) D.C. United
DF	(Argentina) Nahuel Molina	(Argentina) Rosario Central
MF	(Colombia) Sebastián Pérez	(Ecuador) Barcelona
FW	(Argentina) Mauro Luna Diale	(Uruguay) Cerro Largo
FW	(Argentina) Guido Vadalá	(Colombia) Tolima

==== Out ====
Players transferred
Pos.	Name	Club	Fee
DF	(Argentina) Paolo Goltz	(Argentina) Gimnasia y Esgrima (LP)	Free
MF	(Italy) Daniele De Rossi	Retired	Free

Players loaned
Pos.	Name	Club	End date
FW	(Argentina) Ezequiel Cañete	(Argentina) Unión (SF)	June 2021
FW	(Argentina) Mauro Luna Diale	(Argentina) Unión (SF)	June 2021

Loan return
Pos.	Name	Return to
DF	(Argentina) Kevin Mac Allister	(Argentina) Argentinos Juniors
MF	(Argentina) Alexis Mac Allister	(England) Brighton & Hove Albion

== Pre-season and friendlies ==
Win Draw Loss Postponed

=== Winter ===
3 July 2019 Pre-season	América (Mexico)	1–2	(Argentina) Boca Juniors	Harrison, United States
20:00	Aguilar 12'		Zárate 65', 73'	Stadium: Red Bull Arena; Referee: Sorin Soticar

6 July 2019 Pre-season	Guadalajara (Mexico)	0–2	(Argentina) Boca Juniors	Seattle, United States
20:30			Mac Allister 31'; Benedetto 41'	Stadium: CenturyLink Field; Referee: Chipalo Street

10 July 2019 Pre-season	Tijuana (Mexico)	1–0	(Argentina) Boca Juniors	Tijuana, Mexico
23:00	Bolaños 87'			Stadium: Estadio Caliente

== Competitions ==
=== Overall ===
Competition	First match	Last match	Starting round	Final position	Record							
Competition	First match	Last match	Starting round	Final position	Pld	W	D	L	GF	GA	GD	Win %
Primera División	28 July 2019	8 March 2020	Matchday 1	Winners	23	14	6	3	35	8	+27	60.87
Copa de la Superliga	14 March 2020		Matchday 1	Cancelled	1	1	0	0	4	1	+3	100.00
2018–19 Copa Argentina	13 August 2019		Round of 32^{1}	Round of 32	1	0	1	0	1	1	+0	0.00
2019 Copa Libertadores	24 July 2019	22 October 2019	Round of 16^{2}	Semifinals	6	4	1	1	7	2	+5	66.67
2020 Copa Libertadores	3 March 2020	7 May 2020	Group stage	TBD^{3}	5	3	2	0	7	1	+6	60.00
Total					36	22	10	4	54	13	+41	61.11

Last updated: 15 March 2020.
Source: Competitions

1: The Round of 64 was played in the previous season. 2: The group stage was played in the previous season. 3: The final stages will be played in the next season.

=== Primera División ===
==== League table ====
Pos	Team	Pld	W	D	L	GF	GA	GD	Pts	Qualification
1	Boca Juniors (C)	23	14	6	3	35	8	+27	48	Qualification for Copa Libertadores group stage
2	River Plate	23	14	5	4	41	18	+23	47	
3	Vélez Sarsfield	23	11	6	6	27	14	+13	39	
4	Racing	23	9	12	2	28	23	+5	39	
5	Argentinos Juniors	23	10	9	4	22	17	+5	39	

Source: AFA
Rules for classification: 1) points; 2) play-off (only if needed to decide championship); 3) goal difference; 4) goals scored; 5) head-to-head points; 6) head-to-head goal difference; 7) head-to-head goals scored.
(C) Champions

==== Relegation table ====
Pos	Team	2016–17 Pts	2017–18 Pts	2018–19 Pts	Total Pts	Total Pld	Avg	Relegation
1	Boca Juniors	58	51	48	157	75	2.093	
2	Racing	45	57	39	141	75	1.88	
3	River Plate	45	45	47	137	75	1.827	

==== Results summary ====
Overall								Home						Away					
Pld	W	D	L	GF	GA	GD	Pts	W	D	L	GF	GA	GD	W	D	L	GF	GA	GD
23	14	6	3	35	8	+27	48	7	4	1	18	4	+14	7	2	2	17	4	+13

Source: AFA

==== Results by round ====
Round	1	2	3	4	5	6	7	8	9	10	11	12	13	14	15	16	17	18	19	20	21	22	23
Ground	H	A	H	A	A	H	A	H	A	H	A	H	A	H	H	A	H	A	H	A	H	A	H
Result	D	W	W	W	D	W	W	D	W	L	L	W	D	W	D	L	D	W	W	W	W	W	W
Position	13	5	3	1	2	1	1	1	1	1	4	4	1	1	1	3	2	2	2	2	2	2	1

Source: AFA
A = Away; H = Home; W = Win; D = Draw; L = Loss

==== Matches ====
Win Draw Loss Postponed

28 July 2019 1	Boca Juniors	0–0	Huracán	Buenos Aires
20:00 UTC−3	Campuzano (yellow card) 28'; Villa (yellow card) 57'	Report	Salcedo (yellow card) 40'; Gómez (yellow card) 84'; Calello (yellow card) 90+1'	Stadium: La Bombonera; Referee: Diego Abal

4 August 2019 2	Patronato	0–2	Boca Juniors	Paraná
20:00 UTC−3	Rosales (yellow card) 9'; Tarragona (yellow card) 51'; Andrade (yellow card) 66'; Chimino (yellow card) 73'	Report	Salvio 5'; Tevez 15'; Goltz (yellow card) 33'; Marcone (yellow card) 89'	Stadium: Presbítero Bartolomé Grella; Referee: Fernando Rapallini

18 August 2019 3	Boca Juniors	2–0	Aldosivi	Buenos Aires
20:00 UTC−3	Izquierdoz (yellow card) 26'; Tevez 34'; Marcone (yellow card) 48'; Salvio 77'	Report	Galeano (yellow card) 69'	Stadium: La Bombonera; Referee: Mauro Vigliano

25 August 2019 4	Banfield	0–1	Boca Juniors	Banfield
20:00 UTC−3	Urzi (yellow card) 67'	Report	Soldano 0'; Hurtado (yellow card) 11'; Buffarini (yellow card) 26'; Alonso (yellow card) 67'; Almendra (red card) 77'	Stadium: Florencio Solá; Referee: Fernando Echenique

1 September 2019 5	River Plate	0–0	Boca Juniors	Buenos Aires
17:00 UTC−3	Pérez (yellow card) 32'; Casco (yellow card) 83'; Fernández (yellow card) 86'	Report	Izquierdoz (yellow card) 17'; López (yellow card) 23'; Marcone (yellow card) 36'; Hurtado (yellow card) 40'; Capaldo (yellow card) 54'; Andrada (yellow card) 63'; Fabra (yellow card) 90'	Stadium: Monumental Antonio Vespucio Liberti; Referee: Fernando Rapallini

15 September 2019 6	Boca Juniors	1–0	Estudiantes (LP)	Buenos Aires
20:00 UTC−3	Reynoso 3'; Marcone (yellow card) 13'; Weigandt (yellow card) 19'; Capaldo (yellow card) 30'; Fabra (yellow card) 68'	Report	Gómez (yellow card) 17'; Kalinski (yellow card) 45'	Stadium: La Bombonera; Referee: Facundo Tello

21 September 2019 7	San Lorenzo	0–2	Boca Juniors	Buenos Aires
17:45 UTC−3	Menossi (yellow card) 20'; Bareiro (yellow card) 62'; O. Romero (yellow card) 74'	Report	López (yellow card) 16' (goal) 43'; Reynoso (yellow card) 74'; Hurtado 90+2'	Stadium: Pedro Bidegain; Referee: Mauro Vigliano

28 September 2019 8	Boca Juniors	1–1	Newell's Old Boys	Buenos Aires
20:00 UTC−3	Almendra (yellow card) 12'; Izquierdoz 30'	Report	Gentiletti (yellow card) 37'; Villarruel (yellow card) 46'; Rodríguez (yellow card) 48'; Lema (yellow card) 76'; Insaurralde 79'	Stadium: La Bombonera; Referee: Darío Herrera

6 October 2019 9	Defensa y Justicia	0–1	Boca Juniors	Florencio Varela
20:00 UTC−3	Merlini (yellow card) 81'	Report	Almendra 18'; Hurtado (yellow card) 41'; A. Mac Allister (yellow card) 53'; Marcone (yellow card) 83'; Buffarini (yellow card) 87' (yellow-red card) 90+2'	Stadium: Norberto Tomaghello; Referee: Pablo Echavarría

18 October 2019 10	Boca Juniors	0–1	Racing Club	Buenos Aires
21:10 UTC−3	Soldano (yellow card) 38'; Reynoso (yellow card) 43'; Andrada (yellow card) 44'; Alonso (yellow card) 81'	Report	Zaracho 27'; Rojas (yellow card) 46'	Stadium: La Bombonera; Referee: Fernando Echenique

31 October 2019 11	Lanús	2–1	Boca Juniors	Lanús
21:20 UTC−3	Sand 8' (yellow card) 88'; Auzqui (yellow card) 38' (goal) 48'; Valenti (yellow card) 43'; Di Plácido (yellow card) 67'; Quignon (yellow card) 69'; Belmonte (yellow card) 76'; Abecasis (yellow card) 80'	Report	Zárate (yellow card) 27' (goal) 34'; Almendra (yellow card) 29'; Buffarini (yellow card) 35'; Izquierdoz (yellow card) 55' (yellow-red card) 79'; Tevez (yellow card) 76'; Mas (yellow card) 90+2'	Stadium: Ciudad de Lanús; Referee: Fernando Rapallini

3 November 2019 12	Boca Juniors	5–1	Arsenal	Buenos Aires
11:00 UTC−3	Tevez 15'; Ábila 43' (yellow card) 61'; Fabra 49', 90'; Reynoso (yellow card) 78'; Zárate 88'	Report	Piovi (yellow card) 30'; Pereyra (yellow card) 61'; Álvarez Suárez 88'	Stadium: La Bombonera; Referee: Pablo Echavarría

10 November 2019 13	Vélez Sarsfield	0–0	Boca Juniors	Buenos Aires
20:00 UTC−3	Fernández (yellow card) 10'; Domínguez (yellow card) 32'; Gianetti (yellow card) 41'; Cufré (yellow card) 88'	Report	López (yellow card) 10'; Fabra (yellow card) 46' (yellow-red card) 60'; Marcone (yellow card) 61'; Reynoso (yellow card) 86'; Hurtado (yellow card) 89'	Stadium: José Amalfitani Stadium; Referee: Patricio Loustau

22 November 2019 14	Boca Juniors	2–0	Unión	Buenos Aires
17:10 UTC−3	Ábila 2' (yellow card) 53'; A. Mac Allister 55'; Marcone (yellow card) 81'	Report	Corvalán (yellow card) 74'	Stadium: La Bombonera; Referee: Facundo Tello

30 November 2019 15	Boca Juniors	1–1	Argentinos Juniors	Buenos Aires
19:40 UTC−3	Ábila 28'; Izquierdoz (yellow card) 64'; Villa (red card) 90+4'	Report	F. Mac Allister (yellow card) 30'; Vera (yellow card) 37'; Silva 53'; Sandoval (yellow card) 82'	Stadium: La Bombonera; Referee: Andrés Merlo

8 December 2019 16	Rosario Central	1–0	Boca Juniors	Rosario
19:40 UTC−3	Ribas 16'; Rinaudo (yellow card) 54'; Rius (yellow card) 90+1'	Report	Ábila (yellow card) 26'; Capaldo (yellow card) 40' (yellow-red card) 90+4'; De Rossi (yellow card) 44'; Marcone (yellow card) 59'	Stadium: Gigante de Arroyito; Referee: Diego Abal

26 January 2020 17	Boca Juniors	0–0	Independiente	Buenos Aires
21:45 UTC−3	Izquierdoz (yellow card) 17' (yellow-red card) 21'; Fabra (yellow card) 77'	Report	Franco (yellow card) 12'; Romero (yellow card) 26'; Pérez (red card) 75'; Benítez (yellow card) 84'; Martínez (yellow card) 22'	Stadium: La Bombonera; Referee: Fernando Echenique

2 February 2020 18	Talleres (C)	1–2	Boca Juniors	Córdoba
21:45 UTC−3	Tenaglia (yellow card) 26'; Menéndez (yellow card) 39'; Valoyes 80'; Moreno (yellow card) 90+2'; Gandolfi (yellow card) 90+2'	Report	Villa 13'; Campuzano (yellow card) 50'; Tevez 63'	Stadium: Mario Alberto Kempes; Referee: Fernando Rapallini

8 February 2020 19	Boca Juniors	2–0	Atlético Tucumán	Buenos Aires
21:45 UTC−3	Soldano 22'; Campuzano (yellow card) 29'; Fabra (yellow card) 87'; Ábila 90+5' (pen.)	Report	Bravo (yellow card) 13'; Ortiz (yellow card) 52'	Stadium: La Bombonera; Referee: Mauro Vigliano

16 February 2020 20	Central Córdoba (SdE)	0–4	Boca Juniors	Santiago del Estero
21:50 UTC−3	Vega (yellow card) 45'; Vera Oviedo (yellow card) 45+1'; Meli (yellow card) 59'	Report	Tevez 3', 52', (penalty missed) 36'; Salvio 25'; Izquierdoz (yellow card) 51'; Villa 58'; Soldano (penalty missed) 82'	Stadium: Alfredo Terrera; Referee: Facundo Tello

23 February 2020 21	Boca Juniors	3–0	Godoy Cruz	Buenos Aires
19:40 UTC−3	Tevez 18'; Fernández (yellow card) 32'; Salvio 82', 86'	Report	Carrasco (yellow card) 35'; Cartagena (yellow card) 46'; Herrera (red card) 70'; Alanís (yellow card) 90+1'	Stadium: La Bombonera; Referee: Nicolás Lamolina

28 February 2020 22	Colón	0–4	Boca Juniors	Santa Fe
21:10 UTC−3	Delgado (yellow card) 31'; Olivera (yellow card) 79'	Report	Izquierdoz (yellow card) 14'; Fernández (yellow card) 24' (goal) 55'; Campuzano (yellow card) 65'; Salvio 72'; Tevez 74'; Ábila 84'	Stadium: Brigadier General Estanislao López; Referee: Diego Abal

8 March 2020 23	Boca Juniors	1–0	Gimnasia y Esgrima (LP)	Buenos Aires
UTC−3	Fabra (yellow card) 17'; Tevez 71' (yellow card) 72'; Salvio (yellow card) 80'; Capaldo (yellow card) 89'	Report	Goltz (yellow card) 66'; Licht (yellow card) 70'; Ayala (yellow card) 89'	Stadium: La Bombonera; Referee: Facundo Tello

=== Copa de la Superliga ===
==== Zone A ====
Pos	Team	Pld	W	D	L	GF	GA	GD	Pts	Qualification
1	Boca Juniors	1	1	0	0	4	1	+3	3	Advance to semi-finals
2	San Lorenzo	1	1	0	0	3	1	+2	3	Advance to semi-finals
3	Independiente	1	1	0	0	1	0	+1	3	
4	Banfield	1	0	1	0	0	0	0	1	
5	Gimnasia y Esgrima (LP)	1	0	1	0	0	0	0	1	

Updated to match(es) played on 14 March 2020. Source: AFA
Rules for classification: 1) points; 2) goal difference; 3) goals scored; 4) head-to-head points; 5) head-to-head goal difference; 6) head-to-head goals scored.

==== Results summary ====
Overall								Home						Away					
Pld	W	D	L	GF	GA	GD	Pts	W	D	L	GF	GA	GD	W	D	L	GF	GA	GD
1	1	0	0	4	1	+3	3	0	0	0	0	0	0	1	0	0	4	1	+3

Source: AFA

==== Results by round ====
Round	1	2	3	4	5	6	7	8	9	10	11
Ground	A	H	A	H	H	A	A	H	A	H	A
Result	W	C	C	C	C	C	C	C	C	C	C
Position	1	–	–	–	–	–	–	–	–	–	–

Source: AFA
A = Away; H = Home; W = Win; D = Draw; L = Loss; C = Cancelled

==== Matches ====
14 March 2020 1	Godoy Cruz	1–4	Boca Juniors	Mendoza
20:00 UTC−3	Badaloni 28'; Ortiz (yellow card) 49'; Almeida (yellow card) 80'; Pizarro (yellow card) 90'	Report	Buffarini 6'; Salvio 30'; Mas (yellow card) 41'; Izquierdoz 66'; Campuzano 88'	Stadium: Malvinas Argentinas; Referee: Darío Herrera

=== Copa Argentina ===
==== Round of 32 ====
13 August 2019	Boca Juniors	1–1 (1–3 p)	Almagro	La Plata
21:10 UTC−3	De Rossi 27' (yellow card) 35'; Fabra (yellow card) 49'; Alonso (yellow card) 90+2'	Report	Bossio (yellow card) 31'; Arrechea (yellow card) 45+1'; Martínez 81'	Stadium: Ciudad de La Plata; Referee: Silvio Trucco
	Penalties
	Tevez (penalty scored); A. Mac Allister (penalty missed); Hurtado (penalty missed); Salvio (penalty missed)		(penalty scored) Denis; (penalty scored) Wilchez; (penalty scored) Coscia

=== 2019 Copa Libertadores ===
==== Final Stages ====
===== Round of 16 =====
24 July 2019 First leg	Athletico Paranaense (Brazil)	0–1	(Argentina) Boca Juniors	Curitiba, Brazil
21:30 UTC−3	Bruno Guimarães (yellow card) 1'; González (yellow card) 86'; Andrade (yellow card) 86'; Ruben (penalty missed) 90+4'	Report	Goltz (yellow card) 24'; Capaldo (yellow card) 52'; Ábila (yellow card) 54'; Marcone (yellow card) 62'; A. Mac Allister 82'; Andrada (yellow card) 90+3'	Stadium: Arena da Baixada; Referee: Daniel Fedorczuk (Uruguay)

31 July 2019 Second leg	Boca Juniors (Argentina)	2–0 (3–0 agg.)	(Brazil) Athletico Paranaense	Buenos Aires, Argentina
21:30 UTC−3	Nández (yellow card) 5'; Weigandt (yellow card) 7'; Izquierdoz (yellow card) 18'; Ábila 56' (yellow card) 86'; Salvio 90+4'	Report	Wellington (yellow card) 37'; Pedro Henrique (yellow card) 41'; Bruno Guimarães (yellow card) 68'; Marcelo Cirino (yellow card) 72'	Stadium: La Bombonera; Referee: Julio Bascuñán (Chile)

===== Quarterfinals =====
21 August 2019 First leg	LDU Quito (Ecuador)	0–3	(Argentina) Boca Juniors	Quito, Ecuador
17:15 UTC−5	Aguirre (yellow card) 11'; Orejuela (red card) 45+2'; Minda (red card) 47'; Caicedo (yellow card) 72'; Alcívar (yellow card) 84'	Report	Ábila 10'; Reynoso 46'; A. Mac Allister (yellow card) 68'; Caicedo 80' (o.g.)	Stadium: Estadio Rodrigo Paz Delgado; Referee: Wilmar Roldán (Colombia)
Note: Minda was sent off from the bench of substitutes.

28 August 2019 Second leg	Boca Juniors (Argentina)	0–0 (3–0 agg.)	(Ecuador) LDU Quito	Buenos Aires, Argentina
19:15 UTC−3	Capaldo (yellow card) 41'; Weigandt (yellow card) 49'	Report	Rodríguez (yellow card) 13'; Aguirre (yellow card) 14'; Guerra (yellow card) 17'; Valencia (yellow card) 51'; Alcívar (yellow card) 62'	Stadium: La Bombonera; Referee: Wilton Sampaio (Brazil)

===== Semifinals =====
1 October 2019 First leg	River Plate (Argentina)	2–0	(Argentina) Boca Juniors	Buenos Aires, Argentina
21:30 UTC−3	Santos Borré 6' (pen.); Fernández (yellow card) 45+1' (goal) 69'; Pérez (yellow card) 56'; Pinola (yellow card) 85'	Report	Mas (yellow card) 10'; Izquierdoz (yellow card) 35'; López (yellow card) 43'; Capaldo (red card) 90+6'	Stadium: Estadio Monumental Antonio Vespucio Liberti; Referee: Raphael Claus (Brazil)

22 October 2019 Second leg	Boca Juniors (Argentina)	1–0 (1–2 agg.)	(Argentina) River Plate	Buenos Aires, Argentina
21:30 UTC−3	A. Mac Allister (yellow card) 45+1'; Marcone (yellow card) 53'; Tevez (yellow card) 71'; Hurtado 79'	Report	Fernández (yellow card) 54'; Pérez (yellow card) 78'; Díaz (yellow card) 87'; Scocco (yellow card) 88'; Martínez Quarta (yellow card) 90+1'	Stadium: La Bombonera; Referee: Wilton Sampaio (Brazil)

=== 2020 Copa Libertadores ===
==== Group stage ====
Pos	Team	Pld	W	D	L	GF	GA	GD	Pts	Qualification	BOC	LIB	CAR	DIM
1	(Argentina) Boca Juniors	6	4	2	0	10	1	+9	14	Round of 16	—	0–0	3–0	3–0
2	(Paraguay) Libertad	6	2	1	3	8	11	−3	7	Round of 16	0–2	—	3–2	2–4
3	(Venezuela) Caracas	6	2	1	3	8	12	−4	7	Copa Sudamericana	1–1	2–1	—	0–2
4	(Colombia) Independiente Medellín	6	2	0	4	9	11	−2	6		0–1	1–2	2–3	—

Source: CONMEBOL

3 March 2020 1	Caracas (Venezuela)	1–1	(Argentina) Boca Juniors	Caracas, Venezuela
20:30 UTC−4	Celis (yellow card) 29'; Hernández 55'; Bonsu Osei (yellow card) 84'	Report	Ábila 25'; Marcone (yellow card) 53'; Mas (yellow card) 62'; Buffarini (yellow card) 88'	Stadium: Estadio Olímpico de la UCV; Referee: Esteban Ostojich (Uruguay)

10 March 2020 2	Boca Juniors (Argentina)	3–0	(Colombia) Independiente Medellín	Buenos Aires, Argentina
21:30 UTC−3	Salvio 35', 57'; Tevez (yellow card) 40'; Reynoso 72' (yellow card) 80'	Report	Caicedo (yellow card) 27'; Cadavid (yellow card) 41'; Flores (yellow card) 71'	Stadium: La Bombonera; Referee: Guillermo Guerrero (Ecuador)

17 September 2020 3	Libertad (Paraguay)	0–2	(Argentina) Boca Juniors	Asunción, Paraguay
20:00 UTC−4	Mejía (yellow card) 47'; Bareiro (yellow card) 61' (yellow-red card) 86'; Ferreira (yellow card) 75'	Report	Salvio 6', 84'; Campuzano (yellow card) 34'; Mas (yellow card) 76'	Stadium: Estadio General Pablo Rojas; Referee: Rodolpho Toski (Brazil)
Note: On 12 March 2020, CONMEBOL announced that the tournament would be temporarily suspended after group stage matchday 2 due to the COVID-19 pandemic, with matches on matchday 3, originally scheduled for 17–19 March 2020, postponed to a later date.

24 September 2020 4	Independiente Medellín (Colombia)	0–1	(Argentina) Boca Juniors	Medellín, Colombia
19:00 UTC−5	Rodríguez (yellow card) 26'; Cadavid (yellow card) 37'	Report	Campuzano (yellow card) 32'; Zambrano (yellow card) 38'; Salvio 88'	Stadium: Estadio Atanasio Girardot; Referee: Augusto Aragón (Ecuador)
Note: On 12 March 2020, CONMEBOL announced that the tournament would be temporarily suspended after group stage matchday 2 due to the COVID-19 pandemic, with matches on matchday 3, originally scheduled for 17–19 March 2020, postponed to a later date.

29 September 2020 5	Boca Juniors (Argentina)	0–0	(Paraguay) Libertad	Buenos Aires, Argentina
21:30 UTC−3	Soldano (yellow card) 14'; Fabra (yellow card) 38'	Report	Bareiro (yellow card) 33'	Stadium: La Bombonera; Referee: Roberto Tobar (Chile)
Note: On 12 March 2020, CONMEBOL announced that the tournament would be temporarily suspended after group stage matchday 2 due to the COVID-19 pandemic, with matches on matchday 3, originally scheduled for 17–19 March 2020, postponed to a later date.

22 October 2020 6	Boca Juniors (Argentina)	3–0	(Venezuela) Caracas	Buenos Aires, Argentina
21:30 UTC−3	López 27'; Tevez 33', 44'	Report	Hernández (penalty missed) 13'; Villanueva (yellow card) 15'; Blanco (yellow card) 49'	Stadium: La Bombonera; Referee: Christian Ferreyra (Uruguay)
Note: On 12 March 2020, CONMEBOL announced that the tournament would be temporarily suspended after group stage matchday 2 due to the COVID-19 pandemic, with matches on matchday 3, originally scheduled for 17–19 March 2020, postponed to a later date.

== Team statistics ==
	Total	Home	Away	Neutral
Games played	36	16	18	1
Games won	22	10	12	
Games drawn	10	6	3	1
Games lost	4	1	3	
Biggest win	5-1 vs Arsenal	5-1 vs Arsenal	4-0 vs Central Córdoba (SdE)	
Biggest loss	2-0 vs River Plate	1-0 vs Racing Club	2-0 vs River Plate	None
Biggest win (Primera División)	5-1 vs Arsenal	5-1 vs Arsenal	4-0 vs Central Córdoba (SdE)	
Biggest win (Copa de la Superliga)	4-1 vs Godoy Cruz		4-1 vs Godoy Cruz	
Biggest win (Copa Argentina)	None			
Biggest win (Copa Libertadores)	3-0 vs LDU Quito	3-0 vs Independiente Medellín	3-0 vs LDU Quito	
Biggest loss (Primera División)	1-0 vs Racing Club	1-0 vs Racing Club	2-1 vs Lanús	
Biggest loss (Copa de la Superliga)				
Biggest loss (Copa Argentina)	None			
Biggest loss (Copa Libertadores)	2-0 vs River Plate		2-0 vs River Plate	None
Clean sheets	25	13	12	
Goals scored	54	24	29	1
Goals conceded	13	4	8	1
Goal difference	+41	+20	+21	0
Yellow cards	98	44	51	3
Red cards	7	2	5	
Worst discipline	Izquierdoz; Capaldo (2 RC)	Villa; Izquierdoz (1 RC)	Capaldo (2 RC)	
Penalties for	3	1	2	
Penalties against	1		1	

=== Season Appearances and goals ===
As of 29 September 2020

No.	Pos	Nat	Player	Total		Primera División		Copa de la Superliga		Copa Argentina		Copa Libertadores	
No.	Pos	Nat	Player	Apps	Goals	Apps	Goals	Apps	Goals	Apps	Goals	Apps	Goals
Goalkeepers
1	GK	(Argentina) ARG	Esteban Andrada	32	-10	20	-7	1	0	0	0	11	-3
12	GK	(Argentina) ARG	Marcos Díaz	4	-2	3	-1	0	0	1	-1	0	0
28	GK	(Argentina) ARG	Manuel Roffo	0	0	0	0	0	0	0	0	0	0
Defenders
3	DF	(Argentina) ARG	Emmanuel Mas	16	0	5	0	1	0	0	0	9+1	0
4	DF	(Argentina) ARG	Julio Buffarini	25	1	20	0	1	1	0	0	2+2	0
5	DF	(Peru) PER	Carlos Zambrano	4	0	1	0	0	0	0	0	3	0
15	DF	(Argentina) ARG	Leonardo Jara	4	0	0	0	0	0	0	0	4	0
18	DF	(Colombia) COL	Frank Fabra	22	2	18	2	0	0	1	0	2+1	0
20	DF	(Argentina) ARG	Lisandro López	21	1	14+1	1	0	0	1	0	5	0
24	DF	(Argentina) ARG	Carlos Izquierdoz	28	2	17	1	1	1	0	0	10	0
32	DF	(Argentina) ARG	Gastón Ávila	1	0	0+1	0	0	0	0	0	0	0
Midfielders
7	MF	(Argentina) ARG	Guillermo Fernández	13	1	7	1	1	0	0	0	4+1	0
8	MF	(Colombia) COL	Edwin Cardona	3	0	0	0	0	0	0	0	0+3	0
11	MF	(Argentina) ARG	Eduardo Salvio	28	13	12+5	6	1	1	1	0	7+2	6
14	MF	(Argentina) ARG	Nicolás Capaldo	24	0	9+3	0	0+1	0	1	0	6+4	0
21	MF	(Colombia) COL	Jorman Campuzano	20	1	11+2	0	0+1	1	0+1	0	4+1	0
23	MF	(Argentina) ARG	Iván Marcone	22	0	11+2	0	1	0	0	0	7+1	0
32	MF	(Argentina) ARG	Gonzalo Maroni	2	0	0	0	0	0	0	0	2	0
39	MF	(Argentina) ARG	Agustín Almendra	7	1	6	1	0	0	0	0	1	0
Forwards
9	MF	(Argentina) ARG	Ramón Ábila	22	8	5+7	5	1	0	1	0	7+1	3
10	FW	(Argentina) ARG	Carlos Tevez	26	9	11+6	9	0	0	0+1	0	6+2	0
19	FW	(Argentina) ARG	Mauro Zárate	19	2	5+7	2	0	0	1	0	3+3	0
22	FW	(Colombia) COL	Sebastián Villa	22	2	13+4	2	0+1	0	0	0	2+2	0
27	FW	(Argentina) ARG	Franco Soldano	19	2	12+1	2	0	0	0	0	5+1	0
34	FW	(Argentina) ARG	Agustín Obando	15	0	7+4	0	1	0	0	0	2+1	0
	FW	(Argentina) ARG	Walter Bou	3	0	0	0	0	0	0	0	0+3	0
Players who have made an appearance or had a squad number this season, but have left the club
2	DF	(Argentina) ARG	Paolo Goltz	5	0	4	0	0	0	0	0	1	0
6	DF	(Paraguay) PAR	Júnior Alonso	20	0	11+3	0	1	0	1	0	3+1	0
13	DF	(Argentina) ARG	Kevin Mac Allister	0	0	0	0	0	0	0	0	0	0
42	DF	(Argentina) ARG	Marcelo Weigandt	9	0	3	0	0	0	1	0	5	0
8	MF	(Argentina) ARG	Alexis Mac Allister	20	2	9+4	1	0	0	1	0	6	1
15	MF	(Uruguay) URU	Nahitan Nández	2	0	0	0	0	0	0	0	2	0
16	MF	(Italy) ITA	Daniele De Rossi	7	1	4+1	0	0	0	1	1	0+1	0
30	MF	(Argentina) ARG	Emanuel Reynoso	25	3	9+9	1	1	0	0	0	2+4	2
40	MF	(Argentina) ARG	Julián Chicco	0	0	0	0	0	0	0	0	0	0
7	FW	(Argentina) ARG	Cristian Pavón	0	0	0	0	0	0	0	0	0	0
9	FW	(Argentina) ARG	Darío Benedetto	0	0	0	0	0	0	0	0	0	0
17	FW	(Venezuela) VEN	Jan Carlos Hurtado	18	2	6+8	1	0	0	0+1	0	0+3	1

=== Top scorers ===
As of 29 September 2020

Rank	Pos.	No.	Name	Primera División	Copa de la Superliga	Copa Argentina	Copa Libertadores	Total
1	MF	11	(Argentina) Eduardo Salvio	6	1		6	13
2	FW	10	(Argentina) Carlos Tevez	9				9
3	FW	9	(Argentina) Ramón Ábila	5			3	8
4	MF	30	(Argentina) Emanuel Reynoso	1			1	2
5	FW	19	(Argentina) Mauro Zárate	2				2
6	FW	17	(Venezuela) Jan Carlos Hurtado	1			1	2
7	DF	18	(Colombia) Frank Fabra	2				2
8	FW	27	(Argentina) Franco Soldano	2				2
9	FW	22	(Colombia) Sebastián Villa	2				2
10	DF	24	(Argentina) Carlos Izquierdoz	1	1			2
11	MF	8	(Argentina) Alexis Mac Allister	1			1	2
12	MF	7	(Argentina) Guillermo Fernández	1				1
13	MF	16	(Italy) Daniele De Rossi			1		1
14	DF	20	(Argentina) Lisandro López	1				1
15	DF	4	(Argentina) Julio Buffarini		1			1
16	MF	21	(Colombia) Jorman Campuzano		1			1
17	MF	39	(Argentina) Agustín Almendra	1				1
Own goals							1	1
Total				35	4	1	13	53

=== Top assists ===
As of 29 September 2020

Rank	Pos.	No.	Name	Primera División	Copa de la Superliga	Copa Argentina	Copa Libertadores	Total
1	DF	18	(Colombia) Frank Fabra	4			1	5
2	MF	8	(Argentina) Alexis Mac Allister	2		1	2	5
3	FW	22	(Colombia) Sebastián Villa	3			1	4
4	MF	11	(Argentina) Eduardo Salvio	3				3
5	FW	10	(Argentina) Carlos Tevez	2			1	3
6	FW	19	(Argentina) Mauro Zárate	2			1	3
7	MF	30	(Argentina) Emanuel Reynoso	3				3
8	FW	27	(Argentina) Franco Soldano	1				1
9	FW	17	(Venezuela) Jan Carlos Hurtado	1				1
10	DF	20	(Argentina) Lisandro López	1				1
11	DF	6	(Paraguay) Júnior Alonso	1				1
12	MF	14	(Argentina) Nicolás Capaldo	1				1
13	MF	7	(Argentina) Guillermo Fernández	1				1
14	FW	9	(Argentina) Ramón Ábila	1				1
15	DF	4	(Argentina) Julio Buffarini		1			1
16	DF	3	(Argentina) Emmanuel Mas		1			1
17	MF	8	(Colombia) Edwin Cardona				1	1
18	MF	15	(Uruguay) Nahitan Nández				1	1
Total				26	2	1	8	37

=== Penalties ===
Date	Penalty Taker	Scored	Opponent	Competition
8 February 2020	Ramón Ábila	Yes	Atlético Tucumán	Primera División
16 February 2020	Carlos Tevez	No	Central Córdoba (SdE)	Primera División
16 February 2020	Franco Soldano	No	Central Córdoba (SdE)	Primera División

=== Clean sheets ===
As of 29 September 2020

Rank	Pos.	No.	Name	Primera División	Copa de la Superliga	Copa Argentina	Copa Libertadores	Total
1	GK	1	(Argentina) Esteban Andrada	15			8	23
2	GK	12	(Argentina) Marcos Díaz	2				2
Total				16			9	25

=== Disciplinary record ===
As of 29 September 2020

No.	Pos	Nat	Name	Primera División			Copa de la Superliga			Copa Argentina			Copa Libertadores			Total		
No.	Pos	Nat	Name	Yellow card	(yellow card) (yellow-red card)	Red card	Yellow card	(yellow card) (yellow-red card)	Red card	Yellow card	(yellow card) (yellow-red card)	Red card	Yellow card	(yellow card) (yellow-red card)	Red card	Yellow card	(yellow card) (yellow-red card)	Red card
Goalkeepers
1	GK	(Argentina)	Esteban Andrada	2									1			3		
12	GK	(Argentina)	Marcos Díaz															
28	GK	(Argentina)	Manuel Roffo															
Defenders
3	DF	(Argentina)	Emmanuel Mas	1			1						3			5		
4	DF	(Argentina)	Julio Buffarini	3	1								1			4	1	
5	DF	(Peru)	Carlos Zambrano										1			1		
15	DF	(Argentina)	Leonardo Jara															
18	DF	(Colombia)	Frank Fabra	7	1					1			1			9	1	
20	DF	(Argentina)	Lisandro López	3									1			4		
24	DF	(Argentina)	Carlos Izquierdoz	9	2								2			11	2	
32	DF	(Argentina)	Gastón Ávila															
Midfielders
7	MF	(Argentina)	Guillermo Fernández	2												2		
8	MF	(Colombia)	Edwin Cardona															
11	MF	(Argentina)	Eduardo Salvio	1												1		
14	MF	(Argentina)	Nicolás Capaldo	5	1								2		1	7	1	1
21	MF	(Colombia)	Jorman Campuzano	4									2			6		
23	MF	(Argentina)	Iván Marcone	8									3			11		
39	MF	(Argentina)	Agustín Almendra	2		1										2		1
	MF	(Argentina)	Gonzalo Maroni															
Forwards
9	FW	(Argentina)	Ramón Ábila	3									2			5		
10	FW	(Argentina)	Carlos Tevez	2									2			4		
19	FW	(Argentina)	Mauro Zárate	1												1		
22	FW	(Colombia)	Sebastián Villa	1		1										1		1
27	FW	(Argentina)	Franco Soldano	1									1			2		
34	FW	(Argentina)	Agustín Obando															
	FW	(Argentina)	Walter Bou															
Players who have made an appearance or had a squad number this season, but have left the club
2	DF	(Argentina)	Paolo Goltz	1									1			2		
6	DF	(Paraguay)	Júnior Alonso	2						1						3		
13	DF	(Argentina)	Kevin Mac Allister															
42	DF	(Argentina)	Marcelo Weigandt	1									2			3		
8	MF	(Argentina)	Alexis Mac Allister	1									2			3		
15	MF	(Uruguay)	Nahitan Nández										1			1		
16	MF	(Italy)	Daniele De Rossi	1						1						2		
30	MF	(Argentina)	Emanuel Reynoso	4									1			5		
40	MF	(Argentina)	Julián Chicco															
7	FW	(Argentina)	Cristian Pavón															
9	FW	(Argentina)	Darío Benedetto															
17	FW	(Venezuela)	Jan Carlos Hurtado	4												4		
Total				65	5	2	1			3			29		1	99	5	3
