= Manuel Llano =

Manuel Llano may refer to:

- Manuel Llano (footballer) (born 1999), Argentine central midfielder
- Manuel Llano (tennis) (died 1931), Mexican tennis player
