= Agustín Almendra =

Argentine footballer (born 2000)

Personal information
- Full name: Agustín Ezequiel Almendra
- Date of birth: 11 February 2000 (age 26)
- Place of birth: San Francisco Solano, Argentina
- Height: 1.82 m (6 ft 0 in)
- Position: Midfielder

Team information
- Current team: Cerro Porteño

Youth career
- Boca Juniors

Senior career*
Years	Team	Apps	(Gls)
2018–2023	Boca Juniors	69	(6)
2023–2026	Racing	102	(6)
2026	Necaxa	7	(0)
2026–	Cerro Porteño	0	(0)

International career^{‡}
2017	Argentina U17	4	(0)
2018–2019	Argentina U20	7	(0)
- * Club domestic league appearances and goals as of 17:43, 17 March 2026 (UTC) ‡ National team caps and goals as of 23 March 2019

Agustín Ezequiel Almendra (born 11 February 2000) is an Argentine professional footballer who plays as a midfielder for APF División de Honor club Cerro Porteño.

== Club career ==
He started his career with Boca Juniors, but reached an agreement to join Racing Club de Avellaneda once his contract expired on 30 June 2023.

== Career statistics ==
As of match played 22 February 2022

Appearances and goals by club, season and competition
Club	Season	League			National Cup		League Cup		Continental		Other		Total	
Club	Season	Division	Apps	Goals	Apps	Goals	Apps	Goals	Apps	Goals	Apps	Goals	Apps	Goals
Boca Juniors	2017–18	Primera División	3	0	1	0	—		1 (Note: Appearances in Copa Libertadores)	0	—		5	0
Boca Juniors	2018–19	Primera División	15	1	1	0	—		5	0	2 (Note: Appearances in Copa de la Superliga)	0	23	0
Boca Juniors	2019–20	Primera División	6	1	4	0	—		—		—		10	1
Boca Juniors	2020–21	Primera División	15	3	4	0	9	0	5	1	—		33	4
Boca Juniors	2022	Primera División	0	0	0	0	2	0	0	0	—		2	0
Boca Juniors	Total		39	5	10	0	11	0	11	1	2	0	73	5
Career total			39	5	10	0	11	0	11	1	2	0	73	5

== Honours ==
Boca Juniors

- Primera División: 2017–18, 2019–20
- Copa Argentina: 2019–20
- Copa de la Liga Profesional: 2020, 2022
- Supercopa Argentina: 2018

Racing Club

- Copa Sudamericana: 2024
- Recopa Sudamericana: 2025
