= Gastón Ávila =

Argentine footballer (born 2001)

Personal information
- Full name: Gastón Luciano Ávila
- Date of birth: 30 September 2001 (age 25)
- Place of birth: Rosario, Argentina
- Height: 1.82 m (6 ft 0 in)
- Positions: Left-back; centre-back

Team information
- Current team: Rosario Central (on loan from Ajax)
- Number: 13

Youth career
- Rosario Central
- 2019–2020: Boca Juniors

Senior career*
| Years | Team | Apps | (Gls) |
| 2020–2022 | Boca Juniors | 9 | (0) |
| 2021 | → Rosario Central (loan) | 27 | (3) |
| 2022–2023 | Young Reds Antwerp | 5 | (1) |
| 2022–2023 | Antwerp | 24 | (0) |
| 2023– | Ajax | 5 | (0) |
| 2023 | Jong Ajax | 1 | (0) |
| 2025 | → Fortaleza (loan) | 29 | (0) |
| 2026– | → Rosario Central (loan) | 13 | (2) |

International career^{‡}
| 2018–2023 | Argentina U20 | 5 | (0) |
| 2023 | Argentina U23 | 2 | (0) |
- * Club domestic league appearances and goals as of 17:07, 10 July 2026 (UTC) ‡ National team caps and goals as of 21 November 2023

Gastón Luciano Ávila (born 30 September 2001) is an Argentine professional footballer who plays as a left-back or centre-back for Argentine Primera División club Rosario Central, on loan from Eredivisie club Ajax.

== Career ==
=== Boca Juniors ===
Born in Rosario, Ávila began his career with Rosario Central. On 2 January 2019, he was signed by Boca Juniors for a reported fee of $2 million for 60% of his economic rights, a move that generated some controversy as he had not yet debuted for the Rosario Central first team. Shortly after his arrival, in March 2019, he suffered a serious knee injury (ruptured ligaments) during a reserve match against Banfield, which sidelined him for the remainder of the year.

Ávila eventually made his professional debut for Boca Juniors on 2 February 2020 in a 2–1 Argentine Primera División win over Talleres.

==== Loan to Rosario Central ====
On 10 February 2021, seeking regular playing time, Ávila returned to Rosario Central on a loan deal until the end of the season. During his loan spell, he established himself as a key starter, scoring 3 goals in 27 league appearances and displaying strong aerial ability and passing range.

=== Antwerp ===
On 23 July 2022, Ávila signed for Belgian Pro League club Antwerp for a fee reported to be around €4.4 million. During the 2022–23 season, he was part of the historic squad that won the "Double", securing both the league title and the Belgian Cup. He primarily featured as a left-back under manager Mark van Bommel.

=== Ajax ===
On 22 August 2023, Eredivisie club Ajax announced the signing of Ávila on a five-year contract, valid until 30 June 2028. The transfer involved a fee of €12.5 million, potentially rising to €14.5 million with add-ons.

Ávila endured a difficult start to his time in Amsterdam. After making only a handful of appearances, his season was cut short in January 2024 when he suffered a rupture of the anterior cruciate ligament (ACL) in his left knee during training. The injury required surgery and ruled him out of action for approximately 12 months, sidelining him for the remainder of the 2023–24 season and the first half of the 2024–25 season.

==== Loan to Fortaleza ====
Having recovered from his long-term knee injury, Ávila was loaned to Brazilian club Fortaleza on 18 January 2025 to regain match fitness. The deal ran until the end of the 2025 calendar year and included an option to buy. He became a regular starter for the Brazilian side, making 29 appearances across all competitions as he rebuilt his form following his year-long absence.

==== Second loan to Rosario Central ====
On 9 January 2026, Ávila returned to Rosario Central on a year-long loan.

== Style of play ==
Ávila is a left-footed defender capable of playing as a centre-back or a left-back. He is known for his aggression in duels, aerial strength despite a modest height for a central defender, and his ability to play progressive passes from the back.

== Personal life ==
Ávila is the younger brother of the footballer Chimy Ávila, who plays as a forward.

== Career statistics ==
=== Club ===
As of match played 16 May 2026

Appearances and goals by club, season and competition
| Club | Season | League | | | State League | | National cup (Note: Includes Copa Argentina, Belgian Cup, KNVB Cup, Copa do Brasil) | | Continental | | Other | | Total | |
| Club | Season | Division | Apps | Goals | Apps | Goals | Apps | Goals | Apps | Goals | Apps | Goals | Apps | Goals |
|---|---|---|---|---|---|---|---|---|---|---|---|---|---|---|
| Boca Juniors | 2019–20 | AFA Liga Profesional de Fútbol | 1 | 0 | — | | 0 | 0 | — | | 4 (Note: Appearances in Copa de la Liga Profesional) | 0 | 5 | 0 |
| Boca Juniors | 2020–21 | AFA Liga Profesional de Fútbol | 4 | 0 | — | | 0 | 0 | — | | — | | 4 | 0 |
| Boca Juniors | 2022 | AFA Liga Profesional de Fútbol | 4 | 0 | — | | 1 | 0 | 2 (Note: Appearances in the Copa Libertadores) | 0 | 2 (Note: Appearances in Torneos de Verano) | 0 | 9 | 0 |
| Boca Juniors | Total | | 9 | 0 | — | | 1 | 0 | 2 | 0 | 6 | 0 | 18 | 0 |
| Rosario Central (loan) | 2021 | AFA Liga Profesional de Fútbol | 27 | 3 | — | | 0 | 0 | 8 (Note: Appearances in Copa Sudamericana) | 0 | — | | 35 | 3 |
| Royal Antwerp II | 2022–23 | Belgian National Division 1 | 5 | 1 | — | | — | | — | | — | | 5 | 1 |
| Antwerp | 2022–23 | Belgian Pro League | 22 | 0 | — | | 4 | 0 | 0 | 0 | — | | 26 | 0 |
| Antwerp | 2023–24 | Belgian Pro League | 2 | 0 | — | | 0 | 0 | 0 | 0 | 1 (Note: Appearance in Belgian Super Cup) | 0 | 3 | 0 |
| Antwerp | Total | | 24 | 0 | — | | 4 | 0 | 0 | 0 | 1 | 0 | 29 | 0 |
| Ajax | 2023–24 | Eredivisie | 5 | 0 | — | | 1 | 0 | 2 (Note: Appearance in UEFA Europa League) | 0 | — | | 8 | 0 |
| Jong Ajax | 2023–24 | Eerste Divisie | 1 | 0 | — | | — | | — | | — | | 1 | 0 |
| Fortaleza (loan) | 2025 | Série A | 27 | 0 | 2 | 0 | 0 | 0 | 1 (Note: Appearances in Copa Libertadores) | 0 | 4 (Note: Appearances in Copa do Nordeste) | 0 | 34 | 0 |
| Rosario Central (loan) | 2026 | AFA Liga Profesional de Fútbol | 13 | 2 | — | | 2 | 0 | 5 | 0 | — | | 20 | 2 |
| Career total | | | 111 | 6 | 2 | 0 | 8 | 0 | 18 | 0 | 11 | 0 | 150 | 6 |

== Honours ==
Boca Juniors

- Primera División: 2019–20
- Copa de la Liga Profesional: 2020, 2022
- Supercopa Argentina: 2018

Antwerp

- Belgian Pro League: 2022–23
- Belgian Cup: 2022–23
- Belgian Super Cup: 2023

Rosario Central

- Supercopa Internacional: 2026
