= Lucas Arzamendia =

Argentine professional footballer

Personal information
- Full name: Lucas Nahuel Arzamendia
- Date of birth: 23 February 1999 (age 27)
- Place of birth: Buenos Aires, Argentina
- Height: 1.79 m (5 ft 10 in)
- Position: Defender

Team information
- Current team: Atenas

Senior career*
Years	Team	Apps	(Gls)
2019–2021	Boca Juniors II		
2019	→ Cerro Largo (loan)	5	(0)
2021–2023	Central Córdoba II		
2023–2025	Argentino de Quilmes	11	(0)
2025–2026	Rampla Juniors	17	(0)
2026–	Atenas	0	(0)
- * Club domestic league appearances and goals as of 23:55, 13 March 2026 (UTC)

Lucas Nahuel Arzamendia (born 23 February 1999) is an Argentine professional footballer who plays as a defender for Uruguayan Segunda División club Atenas.

== Career ==
Arzamendia began his career with Boca Juniors. In 2019, Arzamendia joined Cerro Largo of the Uruguayan Primera División on loan. He made his debut in senior football in February against Danubio, coming off the substitutes bench after sixty-two minutes in place of Facundo Rodríguez in a 2–0 win. A total of five appearances arrived for him in Uruguay, though he started just once; against Rampla Juniors on 10 August.

== Career statistics ==
As of 30 September 2020.

Appearances and goals by club, season and competition
Club	Season	League			Cup		League Cup		Continental		Other		Total	
Club	Season	Division	Apps	Goals	Apps	Goals	Apps	Goals	Apps	Goals	Apps	Goals	Apps	Goals
Boca Juniors	2018–19	Argentine Primera División	0	0	0	0	0	0	0	0	0	0	0	0
Boca Juniors	2019–20	Argentine Primera División	0	0	0	0	0	0	0	0	0	0	0	0
Boca Juniors	Total		0	0	0	0	0	0	0	0	0	0	0	0
Cerro Largo (loan)	2019	Uruguayan Primera División	5	0	—		—		—		0	0	5	0
Career total			5	0	0	0	0	0	0	0	0	0	5	0
