= Manuel Roffo =

Argentine footballer

Personal information
- Full name: Manuel Roffo
- Date of birth: 4 April 2000 (age 26)
- Place of birth: Venado Tuerto, Santa Fe, Argentina
- Height: 1.77 m (5 ft 10 in)
- Position: Goalkeeper

Team information
- Current team: Cerro Porteño
- Number: 1

Youth career
- 2012–2018: Boca Juniors

Senior career*
Years	Team	Apps	(Gls)
2018–2021	Boca Juniors	0	(0)
2021–2023	Tigre	28	(0)
2023–2026	Instituto	115	(0)
2026–	Cerro Porteño	11	(0)

International career
2015	Argentina U15	6	(0)
2017	Argentina U17	4	(0)
2018–2019	Argentina U20	14	(0)
- * Club domestic league appearances and goals as of 17:30, 4 October 2026 (UTC)

Manuel Roffo (born 4 April 2000) is an Argentine professional footballer who plays as a goalkeeper for Cerro Porteño.

== Club career ==
Born in Venado Tuerto, Argentina, Roffo came through the youth setup at Boca Juniors, which he joined in 2012. His performances with the Boca and Argentina youth teams garnered the interest of several European clubs, including Barcelona. He captained several of the clubs youth sides and trained with the first team under Guillermo Barros Schelotto.

He ultimately made no professional appearances for Boca and, on 26 March 2021, he joined Primera Nacional club Tigre on a free transfer. He featured occasionally as Tigre were promoted to the Primera División, being included on the bench on their 1–0 win over Barracas Central to seal promotion on 22 November.

In January 2023, he joined Instituto, signing a contract until the end of 2024. He made his debut in a 2–0 defeat on 20 May 2023, coming on as a substitute for Sebastián Corda after Jorge Carranza was sent off. He made his first start in the next game on 29 May, keeping a clean sheet in a 0–0 draw against Estudiantes. He has since served as the regular first team goalkeeper and, in 2024, was rewarded with a new contract until December 2026.

== International career ==
In 2017, Roffo represented Argentina at the 2017 South American under-17 Championship. He played 4 matches and served as captain against Peru and Brazil.

Later that year, he participated in the 2017 FIFA under-20 World Cup. During this tournament, he served as a backup goalkeeper and did not play any matches as Argentina were eliminated in the group stage. Subsequently, he participated at the 2019 South American under-20 Championship, starting every match as Argentina came runners-up. He was once again the starting goalkeeper for the under-20 team at the 2019 FIFA under-20 World Cup. He played 4 matches as Argentina were knocked out on penalties to Mali.

== Career statistics ==
As of 20 January 2026

Appearances and goals by club, season and competition
Club	Season	League			Cup (Note: Includes Copa Argentina)		Continental		Other		Total	
Club	Season	Division	Goals	Apps	Apps	Goals	Apps	Goals	Apps	Goals	Apps	Goals
Boca Juniors	2018–19	AFA Liga Profesional de Fútbol	0	0	—		—		—		0	0
Boca Juniors	2019–20	AFA Liga Profesional de Fútbol	0	0	—		—		—		0	0
Boca Juniors	Total		0	0	0	0	0	0	0	0	0	0
Tigre	2021	Primera Nacional	27	0	1	0	—		—		14	0
Tigre	2022	AFA Liga Profesional de Fútbol	20	0	1	0	—		—		16	0
Tigre	Total		28	0	2	0	0	0	0	0	30	0
Instituto	2023	AFA Liga Profesional de Fútbol	49	0	1	0	—		—		26	0
Instituto	2024	AFA Liga Profesional de Fútbol	41	0	1	0	—		—		42	0
Instituto	2025	AFA Liga Profesional de Fútbol	52	0	2	0	—		—		35	0
Instituto	Total		142	0	4	0	0	0	0	0	103	0
Career total			218	0	6	0	0	0	0	0	133	0
