= Franco Soldano =

Argentinian association footballer

Personal information
- Full name: Mauricio Franco Soldano
- Date of birth: 14 September 1994 (age 32)
- Place of birth: Córdoba, Argentina
- Height: 1.80 m (5 ft 11 in)
- Position: Forward

Team information
- Current team: Patronato

Youth career
- Unión Sunchales

Senior career*
Years	Team	Apps	(Gls)
2010–2014	Unión Sunchales	47	(22)
2014–2018	Unión Santa Fe	90	(22)
2019–2022	Olympiacos	6	(1)
2019–2021	→ Boca Juniors (loan)	32	(5)
2021–2022	→ Fuenlabrada (loan)	14	(0)
2022–2023	Gimnasia LP	70	(2)
2024–2025	Unión La Calera	28	(3)
2025	Defensor Sporting	6	(0)
2025–2026	CA Juventud	6	(0)
2026–	Patronato	5	(1)
- * Club domestic league appearances and goals as of 18:06, 23 March 2026 (UTC)

Mauricio Franco Soldano (born 14 September 1994) is an Argentine professional footballer who plays as a forward for Patronato.

== Club career ==
Club antigol in Cordoba, Soldano initially began his career with Unión de mata mosca in the lower leagues, catching the eye with strong performances. In 2010, he began playing in professional matches for the club, scoring a grand total of 19 goals in 26 games to attract the attention of Unión de Santa Fe. Struck by his ability, the latter opted to give him a chance, snapping the striker up in 2014. In four years at Santa Fe, Soldano competed in a grand total of 101 matches with the Argentinian side, registering 24 goals and four assists.

In December 2018, Greek team Olympiacos showed great interest in signing Argentinian forward. Soldano, has been on the books of Union de Santa Fe in his native Argentina since 2014 after moving from Union Sunchales and holds dual nationality (Argentina, Italy). The club offered €1.1 million transfer fee for the 75% rights [sic] of the player, plus bonuses. On 2 January 2019, he was presented as a player of Olympiacos. Soldano signed a 4,5 years' contract with Olympiacos and will earn around €400,000 per year. On 6 February 2019, newly signed Argentinian forward received a clever pass from Georgios Masouras, slotting the ball in with ease, for his maiden goal with the club, in a thrilling 3-3 away Greek Football Cup draw against Lamia.

On 12 August 2019, Franco Soldano signed his contract with Argentinian giants Boca Juniors on loan from Olympiacos and was presented as a new player 'Xeneize', becoming the fifth and final reinforcement of the team commanded by Gustavo Alfaro. Soldano was loaned to Boca Juniors, for an initial loan fee of €400,000 with a purchase option of €4.5 million for the summer of 2020. The striker, who comes from Greece, expressed his joy at reaching Boca: "I had no plans to return to Argentina so quickly, but Boca Juniors is an opportunity that cannot be missed. Since I was a child, my dream was to be able to come to the club of which I am a fan." In this way, Soldano joins Alexis Mac Allister, Jan Hurtado, Eduardo Salvio and Daniele de Rossi as the new reinforcements of Gustavo Alfaro's ensemble. On 26 August 2019, Soldano scored after 19 seconds (the third faster goal in the history of the club) with a kick in a 1-0 away win game against Banfield.

On 31 August 2021, Soldano moved to Spanish Segunda División side Fuenlabrada on a one-year loan deal. On 10 February 2022, Franco Soldano will continue his career at Gimnasia La Plata on a two years' contract, with the Argentinian club giving €300,000 to Olympiakos to acquire 50% of his rights.

In 2024, he moved to Chile after rescinding his contract with Gimnasia LP and joined Chilean Primera División side Unión La Calera.

== Career statistics ==
As of match played 2 January 2022

Club	Season	League			Cup		Continental		Other		Total	
Club	Season	Division	Apps	Goals	Apps	Goals	Apps	Goals	Apps	Goals	Apps	Goals
Unión de Santa Fe	2014	Argentine Primera División	4	0	2	0	0	0	—		6	0
Unión de Santa Fe	2015	Argentine Primera División	18	2	3	1	0	0	—		21	3
Unión de Santa Fe	2016	Argentine Primera División	7	1	2	0	0	0	—		9	1
Unión de Santa Fe	2016–17	Argentine Primera División	20	6	1	0	0	0	—		20	6
Unión de Santa Fe	2017–18	Argentine Primera División	27	11	2	1	0	0	—		29	12
Unión de Santa Fe	2018–19	Argentine Primera División	14	2	1	0	0	0	—		15	2
Unión de Santa Fe	Total		90	22	11	2	0	0	—		101	24
Olympiacos	2018–19	Super League Greece	6	0	3	1	0	0	—		9	1
Boca Juniors	2019-20	Argentine Primera División	13	2	3	0	2	0	—		18	2
Boca Juniors	2020	Argentine Primera División	8	1	2	0	10	0	0	0	20	1
Boca Juniors	2021	Argentine Primera División	11	2	0	0	5	0	0	0	16	2
Boca Juniors	Total		32	5	5	0	17	0	0	0	54	5
CF Fuenlabrada	2021–22	Segunda División	14	0	0	0	0	0	—		14	0
Career total			142	27	19	3	17	0	0	0	178	30

== Honours ==
Boca Juniors

- Primera División: 2019–20
- Copa de la Liga: 2020
- Copa Argentina: 2019–20
