= Agustín Obando =

Argentine footballer

Personal information
- Full name: Javier Agustín Obando
- Date of birth: 11 March 2000 (age 26)
- Place of birth: Monte Caseros, Argentina
- Height: 1.72 m (5 ft 8 in)
- Position: Left winger

Team information
- Current team: Atlético Rafaela (on loan from Boca Juniors)

Youth career
- Club Samuel W. Robinson
- 2010–2019: Boca Juniors

Senior career*
Years	Team	Apps	(Gls)
2019–	Boca Juniors	28	(2)
2022–2023	→ Tigre (loan)	36	(1)
2024	→ Platense (loan)	3	(0)
2024–2025	→ Banfield (loan)	10	(0)
2026–	→ Atlético Rafaela (loan)	3	(0)

International career
- Argentina U15
2017	Argentina U17	4	(1)
- * Club domestic league appearances and goals as of 17:11, 4 December 2025 (UTC)

Javier Agustín Obando (born 11 March 2000) is an Argentine professional footballer who plays as a left winger for Atlético Rafaela, on loan from Boca Juniors.

== Club career ==
Obando started his career in the ranks of Boca Juniors, having joined their academy from Club Samuel W. Robinson in 2010. His breakthrough into senior football arrived during the 2018–19 campaign under Gustavo Alfaro, with the manager selecting Obando for his professional debut on 6 April 2019 for a Primera División fixture away at the Estadio José María Minella versus Aldosivi; he featured for seventy-six minutes.

In January 2022, Obando joined Tigre on a two-year loan deal.

== International career ==
In 2017, Obando represented Argentina at the South American U-17 Championship in Chile. He won four caps at the tournament, as well as netting a goal in a 3–0 first stage victory over Peru. He also played for the U15s and had training experience with the U20s; while with the latter, he trained against the senior squad at the 2018 FIFA World Cup in Russia.

== Career statistics ==
As of 7 April 2019.

Appearances and goals by club, season and competition
Club	Season	League			Cup		Continental		Other		Total	
Club	Season	Division	Apps	Goals	Apps	Goals	Apps	Goals	Apps	Goals	Apps	Goals
Boca Juniors	2018–19	Primera División	1	0	0	0	0	0	0	0	1	0
Career total			1	0	0	0	0	0	0	0	1	0

== Honours ==
Boca Juniors

- Primera División: 2019–20
