= Nazareno Solís =

Argentine footballer

Personal information
- Full name: Nazareno Damián Solís
- Date of birth: 22 April 1994 (age 32)
- Place of birth: Campana, Argentina
- Height: 1.66 m (5 ft 5 1/2 in)
- Position: Left winger

Team information
- Current team: Deportivo Madryn

Youth career
- 2004–2013: Villa Dálmine

Senior career*
Years	Team	Apps	(Gls)
2013–2015	Villa Dálmine	50	(10)
2014	→ Universidad de Chile (loan)	0	(0)
2016	Talleres	21	(7)
2016–2026	Boca Juniors	4	(0)
2017–2018	→ Huracán (loan)	10	(0)
2018–2019	→ San Martín SJ (loan)	15	(1)
2019–2020	→ Aldosivi (loan)	17	(2)
2020–2021	→ OFI (loan)	10	(1)
2022	→ Alvarado (loan)	28	(3)
2023	→ Patronato (loan)	28	(3)
2024	→ Gimnasia Mendoza (loan)	40	(4)
2025	→ Deportivo Madryn (loan)	38	(5)
2026–	Deportivo Madryn	10	(0)
- * Club domestic league appearances and goals as of 17:02, 27 April 2026 (UTC)

Nazareno Damián Solís (born 22 April 1994) is an Argentine professional footballer who plays as a left winger for Deportivo Madryn.
