= Gonzalo Maroni =

Argentine footballer

Personal information
- Full name: Gonzalo Maroni
- Date of birth: 18 March 1999 (age 27)
- Place of birth: Córdoba, Argentina
- Height: 1.78 m (5 ft 10 in)
- Position: Attacking midfielder

Team information
- Current team: Barracas Central (on loan from Boca Juniors)
- Number: 33

Youth career
- –2016: Boca Juniors

Senior career*
Years	Team	Apps	(Gls)
2015	Instituto	5	(0)
2016–	Boca Juniors	23	(4)
2018–2019	→ Talleres (loan)	17	(2)
2019–2020	→ Sampdoria (loan)	5	(0)
2021–2022	→ Atlas (loan)	10	(0)
2022–2023	→ San Lorenzo (loan)	34	(2)
2024	→ Tigre (loan)	37	(3)
2025	→ Newell's Old Boys (loan)	27	(2)
2026–	→ Barracas Central (loan)	10	(1)

International career
2018–2019	Argentina U20	15	(3)
- * Club domestic league appearances and goals as of 17:11, 3 June 2026 (UTC)

Gonzalo Maroni (born 18 March 1999) is an Argentine professional footballer who plays as an attacking midfielder for Barracas Central, on loan from Boca Juniors.

== Club career ==
Maroni is a youth exponent from Boca Juniors. On 16 May 2016, he made his first team debut in a league game against Estudiantes.

On 25 June 2019, Maroni joined Serie A side Sampdoria on loan until 30 June 2020 with an option to buy.

== Honours ==
Boca Juniors

- Argentine Primera División: 2017–18
- Copa Argentina: 2019–20
- Copa de la Liga Profesional: 2020

Atlas

- Liga MX: Apertura 2021, Clausura 2022
- Campeón de Campeones: 2022
