= Ezequiel Cañete =

Argentine footballer

Personal information
- Full name: Martín Ezequiel Cañete
- Date of birth: 17 June 1999 (age 27)
- Place of birth: Puerto Rico, Argentina
- Height: 1.75 m (5 ft 9 in)
- Position: Midfielder

Team information
- Current team: Huachipato
- Number: 10

Youth career
- Boca Juniors

Senior career*
Years	Team	Apps	(Gls)
2020–2021	Boca Juniors	0	(0)
2020–2021	→ Unión Santa Fe (loan)	22	(4)
2021–2025	Unión Santa Fe	50	(1)
2023–2024	→ Banfield (loan)	34	(1)
2026–	Huachipato	1	(0)

International career
2018	Argentina U20	4	(2)
- * Club domestic league appearances and goals as of 1 February 2026

Martín Ezequiel Cañete (born 17 June 1999) is an Argentine professional footballer who plays as a midfielder for Chilean club Huachipato.

== Professional career ==
Cañete joined Unión in January 2020, on loan from Boca Juniors. Cañete made his professional debut with Unión Santa Fe in a 0-0 Argentine Primera División tie with Central Córdoba on 24 February 2020.

In January 2026, Cañete moved abroad and signed with Chilean club Huachipato.

== International career ==
Cañete represented the Argentina U20s at the 2018 South American Games.

== Personal life ==
Cañete is the cousin of the footballer Marcelo Cañete.
