= Alexis Blanco =

Argentine footballer (born 1988)

Personal information
- Full name: Alexis Hernán Blanco
- Date of birth: 6 June 1988 (age 38)
- Place of birth: Santa Rosa, Argentina
- Height: 1.87 m (6 ft 2 in)
- Position: Forward

Team information
- Current team: Club Agropecuario Argentino

Senior career*
Years	Team	Apps	(Gls)
2008–2009	Independiente	1	(0)
2009	Sportivo Italiano	18	(7)
2010	Atlético Rafaela	2	(1)
2010	Deportes La Serena	8	(1)
2011	San Martín de Tucumán	11	(1)
2011–2012	Platense	36	(7)
2012–2013	Acassuso	26	(4)
2013–2014	Santiago Morning	8	(2)
2014–2015	Ferro Carril Oeste	43	(19)
2016	Alvarado	17	(8)
2016–2017	Juventud Unida	33	(15)
2017–2018	Gimnasia de Jujuy	15	(6)
2018	Venados	5	(1)
2019	Blooming	28	(17)
2020–2021	Caracas	24	(9)
2021	UTC	23	(11)
2022	Sport Boys	21	(7)
2023–	Club Agropecuario Argentino	14	(3)
- * Club domestic league appearances and goals as of 0:19, 20 January 2025 (UTC)

Alexis Hernán Blanco (born 6 June 1988) is an Argentine association football player. He plays as forward for Primera Nacional team Club Agropecuario Argentino.
