= Manuel Llano (footballer) =

Argentine footballer

Personal information
- Full name: Manuel Tadeo Llano Massa
- Date of birth: 26 August 1999 (age 27)
- Place of birth: Rosario, Argentina
- Height: 1.84 m (6 ft 0 in)
- Position: Right-back

Team information
- Current team: Salernitana

Youth career
- Provincial
- Sarmiento Messi
- Provincial
- 2016–2020: Newell's Old Boys

Senior career*
| Years | Team | Apps | (Gls) |
| 2020–2024 | Newell's Old Boys | 11 | (0) |
| 2021–2022 | → Godoy Cruz (loan) | 14 | (0) |
| 2022 | → Miedź Legnica II (loan) | 9 | (0) |
| 2023 | → San Martín (San Juan) (loan) | 33 | (0) |
| 2024–2025 | Avellino | 8 | (0) |
| 2025–2026 | Casertana | 43 | (5) |
| 2026– | Salernitana | 0 | (0) |
- * Club domestic league appearances and goals as of 26 April 2026

Manuel Tadeo Llano Massa (born 26 August 1999) is an Argentine professional footballer who plays as a right-back for Italian Serie C Group C club Salernitana.

== Career ==
Llano began his career at the age of four with Provincial, remaining until the age of twelve when he departed for Club Sarmiento Fundación Leo Messi. In 2014, Llano returned to Provincial. In 2016, Llano headed to Newell's Old Boys; who his father worked for. His first appearance for their academy came during a victory away to Club Pablo VI, which preceded his promotion into the reserves in November 2017. His first-team breakthrough occurred in 2020 under Frank Darío Kudelka, who initially selected him as an unused substitute for a Primera División draw away to Racing Club on 28 February. He penned pro terms in April.

Llano made his senior debut on 28 December in the Copa de la Liga Profesional against Central Córdoba, as he replaced Ángelo Gabrielli at the interval of an eventual 3–1 victory.

On 14 September 2022, he moved on a one-year loan spell to Ekstraklasa club Miedź Legnica, with an option to buy. Ineligible to play for the first team until the window registration period, he officially joined their fourth division reserve side.

On 12 January 2024, Llano signed a one-a-half-year contract with Avellino in the Italian third-tier Serie C.

On 22 January 2025, he moved to fellow Serie C Group C side Casertana.

== Personal life ==
Llano's father, Hernán, is a football recruiter, working for the likes of Newell's Old Boys and Talleres. He also played football locally, notably appearing for Provincial.

== Career statistics ==
As of 28 December 2020.

Appearances and goals by club, season and competition
| Club | Season | League | | | National cup | | League cup | | Continental | | Other | | Total | |
| Club | Season | Division | Apps | Goals | Apps | Goals | Apps | Goals | Apps | Goals | Apps | Goals | Apps | Goals |
|---|---|---|---|---|---|---|---|---|---|---|---|---|---|---|
| Newell's Old Boys | 2019–20 | Primera División | 0 | 0 | 0 | 0 | 0 | 0 | — | | 0 | 0 | 0 | 0 |
| Newell's Old Boys | 2020–21 (Note: Soccerway counts Copa de la Liga Profesional appearances as league appearances.) | Primera División | 1 | 0 | 0 | 0 | 0 | 0 | — | | 0 | 0 | 1 | 0 |
| Career total | | | 1 | 0 | 0 | 0 | 0 | 0 | — | | 0 | 0 | 1 | 0 |
