= Leonardo Jara =

Argentine footballer (born 1991)

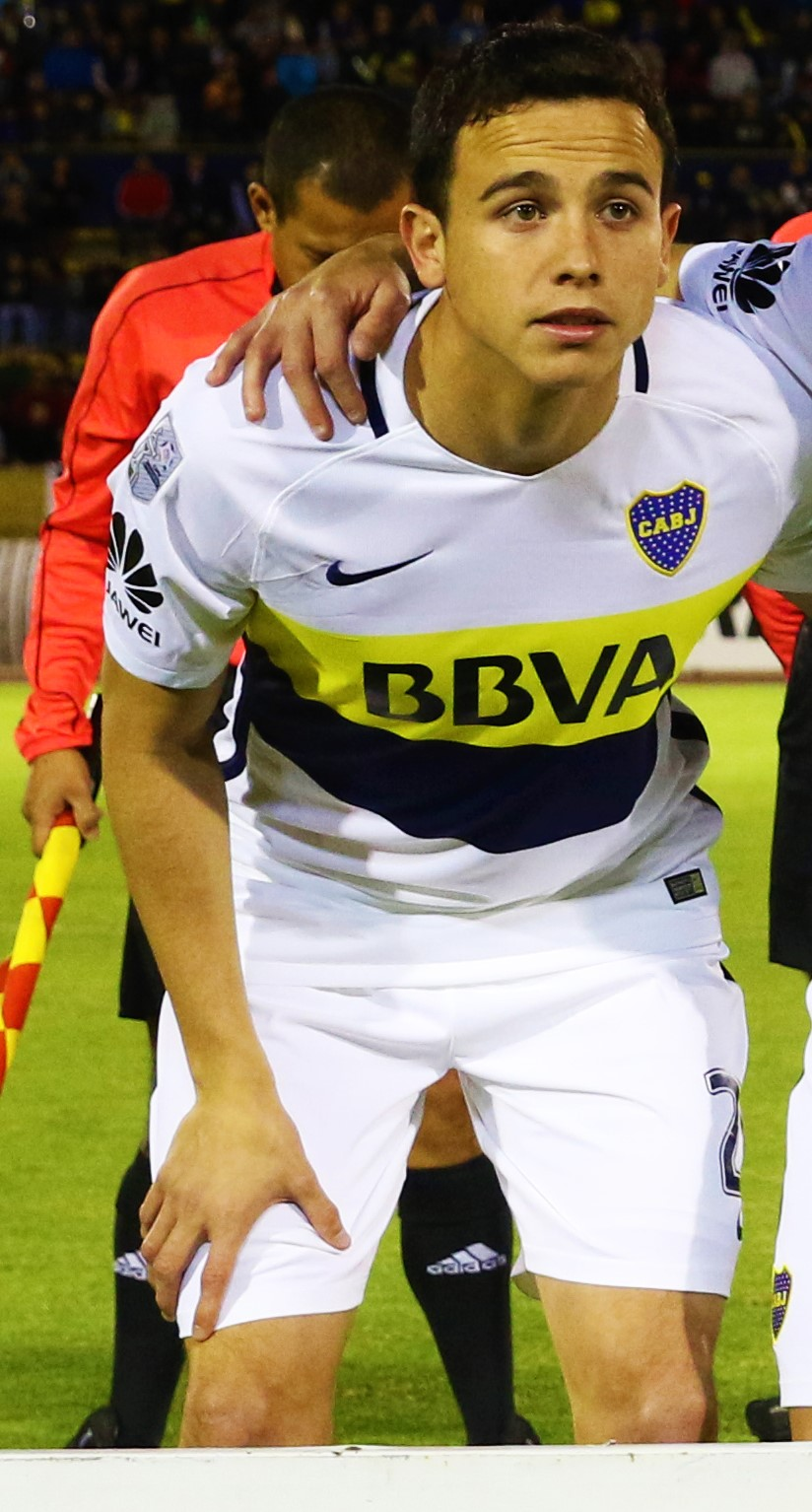

Personal information
- Full name: Leonardo Jara
- Date of birth: 20 May 1991 (age 35)
- Place of birth: Corrientes, Argentina
- Height: 1.78 m (5 ft 10 in)
- Position: Right-back

Team information
- Current team: Almirante Brown

Youth career
- Estudiantes

Senior career*
Years	Team	Apps	(Gls)
2009–2015	Estudiantes	120	(4)
2016–2021	Boca Juniors	65	(1)
2019	→ D.C. United (loan)	30	(1)
2021–2024	Vélez Sarsfield	55	(2)
2024–2025	Lanús	4	(0)
2025–2026	Godoy Cruz	11	(0)
2026–	Almirante Brown	0	(0)
- * Club domestic league appearances and goals as of 13:42, 8 March 2026 (UTC)

Leonardo Jara (born 20 May 1991) is an Argentine footballer who plays as a right-back for Primera Nacional club Almirante Brown.

== Career ==
Before Leonardo joined Boca Juniors, he played for Estudiantes.

=== D.C. United ===
On 30 January 2019 Leonardo was loaned to D.C. United from Boca Juniors. He officially debuted for DC on 3 March 2019, in a game against Atlanta United FC. Leonardo typically played as right-back for United. Leonardo scored his first goal for D.C. against the New England Revolution on 12 July 2019, from a volley from Paul Arriola. D.C. United did not sign Leonardo after his loan expired following the 2019 season.
