= Walter Rodríguez =

Paraguayan football player (born 1995)

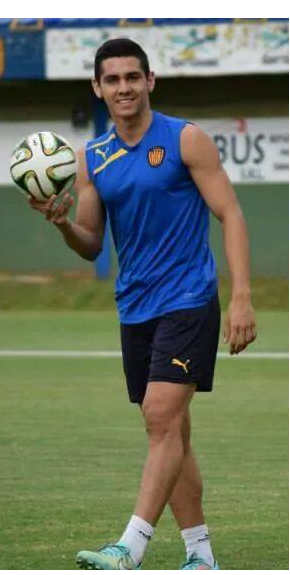

Personal information
- Full name: Walter David Rodríguez Burgos
- Date of birth: 7 October 1995 (age 31)
- Place of birth: Luque, Paraguay
- Height: 1.83 m (6 ft 0 in)
- Position: Midfielder

Team information
- Current team: Sportivo Luqueño
- Number: 8

Youth career
- 2010–2013: Sportivo Luqueño

Senior career*
Years	Team	Apps	(Gls)
2013–2015	Sportivo Luqueño	39	(9)
2015–2016	Parma	11	(0)
2017	Nacional	15	(0)
2018–2019	Deportivo Capiatá	55	(4)
2020	12 de Octubre	7	(0)
2020–2023	Independiente Medellín	3	(0)
2021	→ 12 de Octubre (loan)	10	(0)
2022	→ General Caballero (loan)	21	(0)
2022	→ 12 de Octubre (loan)	14	(0)
2023	Resistencia	18	(1)
2023	General Caballero	21	(1)
2024	Tigre	5	(0)
2024	Deportivo Riestra	3	(0)
2025–	Sportivo Luqueño	18	(1)
- * Club domestic league appearances and goals as of 13 August 2025

Walter David Rodríguez Burgos (born 7 October 1995) is a Paraguayan professional footballer who plays as a central midfielder for Sportivo Luqueño in the Paraguayan Primera División.

== Club career ==
He began playing football at school Soccer Sportivo Luqueño in Luque, then joined the training divisions of Sportivo Luqueño, since then, has been climbing categories, being captain of all the youth teams. The Olimpia was interested in him, but the player decided to remain in the Sportivo Luqueño was called to train with the first team in late 2013 and was part of the main campus to the opening of 2015. Due to its remarkable game aroused the attention of several European teams, which set their sights on the young paraguayan steering wheel only 19 years old and went to try his luck in Italy Reggina, this transfer was thwarted by a penalty he received the Italian club by problems with the documents. But in 2015 a business group acquired its card and carried it back to the Italian football.

=== Parma Calcio ===
In Italy, he first tried to join Virtus Entella, but the team was already complete. In September 2015, the player signed a contract with Parma Calcio.

=== Club Nacional ===
Rodríguez signed with Club Nacional in the Paraguayan Primera División at the start of January 2017.
