= Jan Carlos Hurtado =

Venezuelan footballer (born 2000)

Personal information
- Full name: Jan Carlos Hurtado Anchico
- Date of birth: 5 March 2000 (age 26)
- Place of birth: El Cantón, Venezuela
- Height: 1.81 m (5 ft 11 in)
- Position: Forward

Team information
- Current team: Volos
- Number: 9

Youth career
- –2016: Deportivo Táchira

Senior career*
Years	Team	Apps	(Gls)
2016–2017	Deportivo Táchira	20	(6)
2018–2019	Gimnasia y Esgrima	17	(2)
2019–2025	Boca Juniors	14	(1)
2020–2022	→ Red Bull Bragantino (loan)	65	(5)
2023–2024	→ L.D.U. Quito (loan)	15	(3)
2024	→ Atlético Goianiense (loan)	18	(2)
2025	Gimnasia LP	15	(0)
2026–	Volos	19	(4)

International career^{‡}
2017	Venezuela U17	9	(3)
2017–2020	Venezuela U20	16	(3)
2019–	Venezuela	13	(0)
- * Club domestic league appearances and goals as of 21:45, 7 November 2026 (UTC) ‡ National team caps and goals as of 23:26, 6 June 2025 (UTC)

Jan Carlos Hurtado Anchico (born 5 March 2000) is a Venezuelan professional footballer who plays as a forward for Greek Super League club Volos.

== Club career ==
=== Boca Juniors ===
On 12 July 2019 Argentine Primera División club Boca Juniors signed Hurtado from Gimnasia y Esgrima on a US$5m transfer fee.

==== Red Bull Bragantino (loan) ====
On 10 August 2020, Hurtado joined Campeonato Brasileiro Série A side Red Bull Bragantino on a one-year loan deal. On 11 July 2021 Hurtado extended his loan contract with Red Bull Bragantino until 31 July 2022.

== International career ==
Hurtado was called up to the Venezuela under-20 side for the 2017 FIFA U-20 World Cup. He scored the sixth goal in his side's 7–0 victory over Vanuatu. He made his Venezuela national team debut on 22 March 2019 against Argentina coming in the 89th minute as a substitute for Jhon Murillo.

== Career statistics ==
=== Club ===
As of 14 May 2024

Club	Season	League			National Cup		League Cup		Continental		State League		Other		Total	
Club	Season	Division	Apps	Goals	Apps	Goals	Apps	Goals	Apps	Goals	Apps	Goals	Apps	Goals	Apps	Goals
Deportivo Táchira	2016	Primera División	17	5	4 (Note: Appearances in the Copa Venezuela.)	2	—		—		—		—		21	7
Deportivo Táchira	2017	Primera División	3	1	0	0	—		2 (Note: Appearances in the Copa Libertadores.)	0	—		—		5	1
Deportivo Táchira	Total		20	6	4	2	—		2	0	—		—		26	8
Gimnasia y Esgrima	2018–19	Superliga	17	2	4 (Note: Appearances in the Copa Argentina.)	2	6 (Note: Appearances in the Copa de la Superliga.)	1	—		—		—		27	5
Boca Juniors	2019–20	Superliga	14	1	1	0	0	0	3	1	—		—		18	2
Red Bull Bragantino (loan)	2020	Série A	23	2	2	1	—		—		—		—		25	3
Red Bull Bragantino (loan)	2021	Série A	13	1	2	2	—		6 (Note: Appearances in the Copa Sudamericana.)	0	11 (Note: Appearances in the Campeonato Paulista.)	2	—		32	5
Red Bull Bragantino (loan)	2022	Série A	10	0	1	0	—		3	0	5	0	—		19	0
Red Bull Bragantino (loan)	Total		46	3	5	3	—		9	0	16	2	—		76	8
L.D.U. Quito (loan)	2023	LigaPro	10	3	—		—		0	0	—		—		10	3
L.D.U. Quito (loan)	2024	LigaPro	3	0	—		—		2	0	—		2 (Note: Appearances in the Recopa Sudamericana.)	0	7	0
L.D.U. Quito (loan)	Total		13	3	—		—		2	0	—		2	0	17	3
Career total			110	15	14	7	6	1	16	1	16	2	2	0	164	26

=== International ===
As of match played 6 June 2025.

National team	Year	Apps	Goals
Venezuela	2019	3	0
Venezuela	2021	7	0
Venezuela	2025	3	0
Total		13	0

== Honours ==
=== Club ===
Boca Juniors

- Primera División: 2019–20

Liga de Quito

- Ecuadorian Serie A: 2023
- Copa Sudamericana: 2023

=== International ===
Venezuela

- FIFA U-20 World Cup: Runner-up 2017
