= 2020 Copa de la Liga Profesional final =

Copa Diego Armando Maradona final
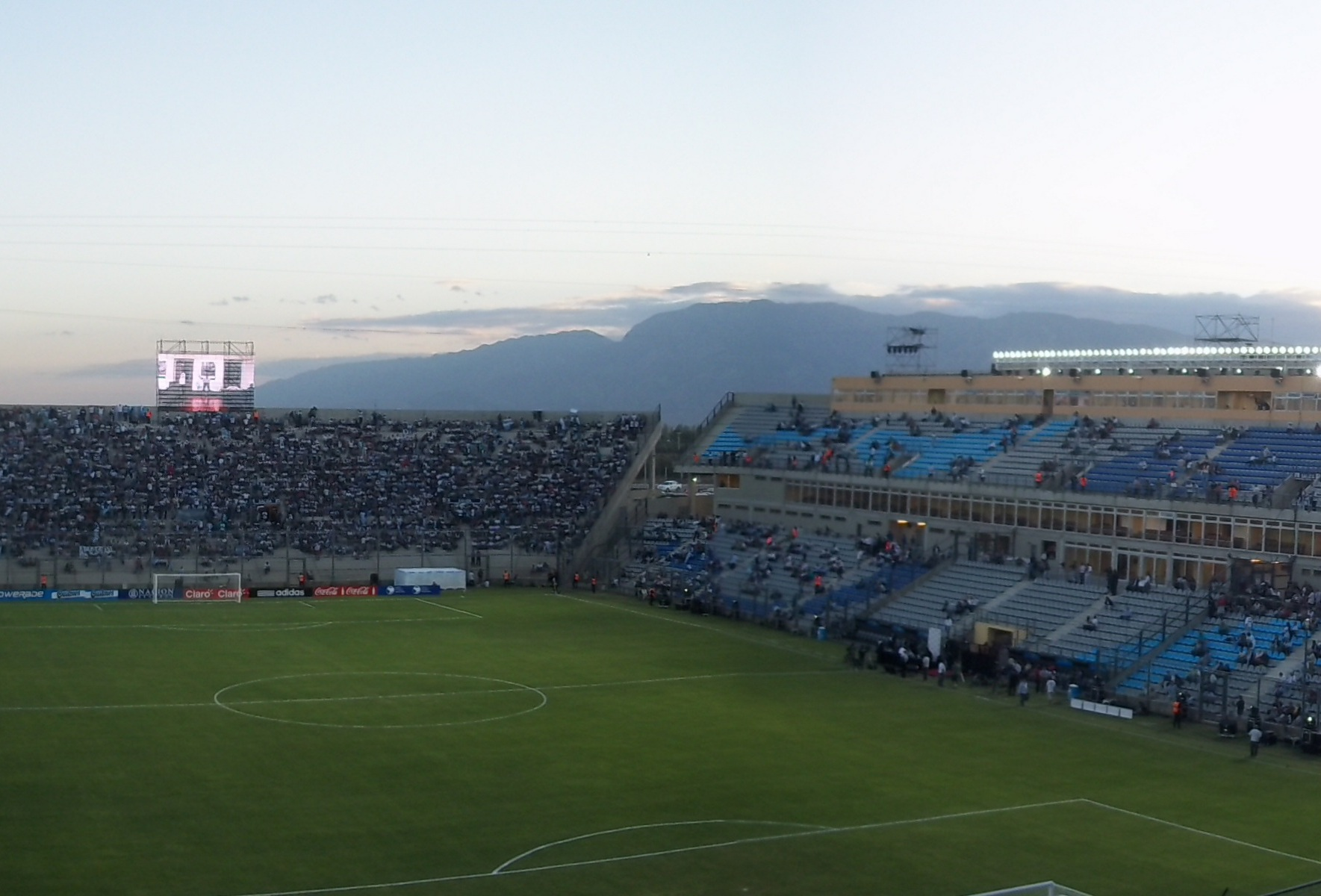
- Estadio San Juan del Bicentenario, venue
- Event: 2020 Copa de la Liga Profesional
Boca Juniors	Banfield
1	1
- Boca Juniors won 5–3 on penalties
- Date: 17 January 2021
- Venue: San Juan del Bicentenario, San Juan
- Man of the Match: Edwin Cardona (Boca Juniors)
- Referee: Facundo Tello
- Attendance: 0

The Copa Diego Armando Maradona final was the final match to decide the champions of the 2020 Copa de la Liga Profesional (renamed "Copa Diego Armando Maradona"), the 1st edition of this national cup. It was played on 17 January 2021 at the Estadio San Juan del Bicentenario in San Juan between Boca Juniors and Banfield.

Boca Juniors won the match via a penalty shoot-out after the game had finished 1–1 and were crowned as champions of the cup. As Boca Juniors had already qualified for the 2021 Copa Libertadores, San Lorenzo (best team of the 2019–20 Superliga Argentina and 2020 Copa de la Superliga aggregate table not yet qualified) gained the 2021 Copa Libertadores berth (Regulations Article 4.2).

The runners-up Banfield won a qualifying play-off against Vélez Sarsfield, winners of the Fase Complementación, to decide which one would participate in the 2022 Copa Sudamericana (Regulations Article 4.7).

== Qualified teams ==
Team	Previous finals appearances (bold indicates winners)
Boca Juniors	None
Banfield	None

=== Road to the final ===
Note: In all results below, the score of the finalist is given first (H: home; A: away).

Boca Juniors		Round	Banfield	
Opponent	Result	Group stage	Opponent	Result
Lanús	2–1 (A)	Matchday 1	River Plate	3–1 (A)
Newell's Old Boys	2–0 (A)	Matchday 2	Godoy Cruz	1–0 (H)
Talleres (C)	0–1 (H)	Matchday 3	Rosario Central	4–2 (A)
Lanús	1–2 (H)	Matchday 4	River Plate	0–2 (H)
Newell's Old Boys	2–0 (H)	Matchday 5	Godoy Cruz	0–0 (A)
Talleres (C)	0–0 (A)	Matchday 6	Rosario Central	1–1 (H)
**Zone 4 winners**: Pos / Team / Pld / Pts; **1** / Boca Juniors / **6** / **10**; 2 / Talleres (C) / 6 / **9**; 3 / Newell's Old Boys / 6 / **7**; 4 / Lanús / 6 / **7**; Source: AFA		Final standings	**Zone 3 runners-up**: Pos / Team / Pld / Pts; 1 / River Plate / 6 / **15**; **2** / Banfield / **6** / **11**; 3 / Rosario Central / 6 / **7**; 4 / Godoy Cruz / 6 / **1**; Source: AFA	
Opponent	Result	Fase Campeón	Opponent	Result
Arsenal	1–1 (H)	Matchday 1	Atlético Tucumán	2–0 (A)
Independiente	2–1 (A)	Matchday 2	Gimnasia y Esgrima (LP)	2–1 (H)
Huracán	3–0 (H)	Matchday 3	Colón	2–1 (A)
River Plate	2–2 (H)	Matchday 4	Talleres (C)	2–3 (A)
Argentinos Juniors	2–2 (A)	Matchday 5	San Lorenzo	4–1 (H)
**Group A winners**: Pos / Team / Pld / Pts; **1** / Boca Juniors / **5** / 9; 2 / River Plate / 5 / 8; 3 / Argentinos Juniors / 5 / 8; 4 / Arsenal / 5 / 7; 5 / Independiente / 5 / 6; 6 / Huracán / 5 / 3; Source: AFA		Final standings	**Group B winners**: Pos / Team / Pld / Pts; **1** / Banfield / **5** / 12; 2 / Talleres (C) / 5 / 11; 3 / Gimnasia y Esgrima (LP) / 5 / 7; 4 / Colón / 5 / 4; 5 / San Lorenzo / 5 / 4; 6 / Atlético Tucumán / 5 / 4; Source: AFA	

== Match ==
=== First half ===
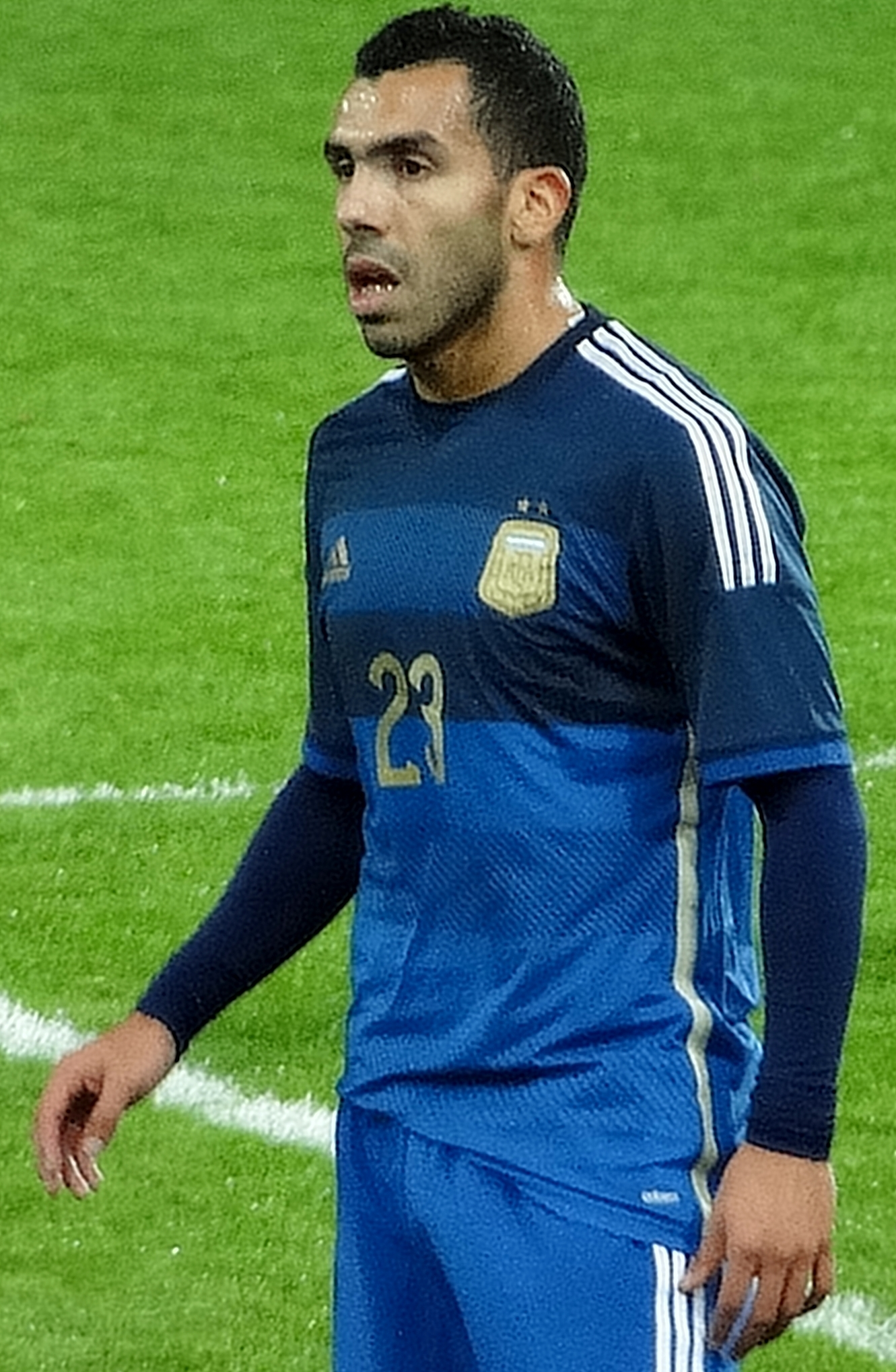
Carlos Tévez, one of the players that scored all the penalties to allow Boca Juniors to win the title

In the first half, both teams were overly cautious and failed to break the score, despite a few near misses. Banfield's strategy was clear from the start: they ceded possession to Boca Juniors and focused on capitalizing on their opponents' mistakes to launch counter-attacks, knowing the opposing attackers' limited tracking back. On the other side, Boca Juniors lacked clarity in attack, except when Edwin Cardona or Sebastián Villa got hold of the ball. A shot from Cardona, another from Villa; two attempts by Martín Payero, some runs by Mauricio Cuero, were the first approaches in the initial minutes, stages that were of study, with maximum concentration from both teams.

From the 30-minute mark onward, both teams began to create chances with a bit more consistency. Villa, with a low shot in the 33rd minute, almost opened the scoring. But immediately afterward came Rodríguez's long-range effort that swerved in the air and forced an unorthodox save from Boca Juniors' goalkeeper Esteban Andrada. Both Boca and Banfield managed to neutralize each other.

=== Second half ===
The lack of depth in the attack continued in the second half. Nevertheless, the first goal of the match came after a moment of brilliance from Cardona, who cut inside from the left, leaving Alexis Maldonado behind, and unleashed a powerful right-footed shot that was unstoppable for goalkeeper Mauricio Arboleda in the 18th minute. However, the Colombian felt a muscle strain as he shot and had to be substituted at his best moment by Eduardo Salvio. From then on, the team from the south tried their best, relying on set pieces and long-range shots.

The sending off of Boca Juniors' Emmanuel Mas for a second yellow card gave Banfield a boost. With renewed energy from the bench, they changed the dynamic of the match against a Boca Juniors side that finished with Nicolás Capaldo as right-back and Julio Buffarini on the left. To make matters worse, Diego González was injured in addittional time, further diminishing Banfield's chances of survival.

And when no one expected it, in the fifth minute of additional time, Luciano Lollo equalized with a double header in the penalty area, surprising Boca Juniors, forcing the match to penalties. In the shootout, the team coached by Miguel Angel Russo won the series 5–3, securing their 70th official title.

=== Details ===
17 January 2021
22:10

Boca Juniors	1–1	Banfield
Cardona 63'	Report	Lollo 90+5'
Penalties
Tevez (penalty scored); Villa (penalty scored); Salvio (penalty scored); Izquierdoz (penalty scored); Buffarini (penalty scored)	5–3	(penalty scored) Lollo; (penalty scored) Fontana; (penalty missed) Rodríguez; (penalty scored) Álvarez

Estadio San Juan del Bicentenario, San Juan
Attendance: 0
Referee: Facundo Tello

Boca Juniors	Banfield

GK	1	(Argentina) Esteban Andrada
RB	4	(Argentina) Julio Buffarini	(yellow card) 39'
CB	5	(Peru) Carlos Zambrano
CB	24	(Argentina) Carlos Izquierdoz (c)
LB	3	(Argentina) Emmanuel Mas	(yellow card) 71' (yellow-red card) 86'
CM	14	(Argentina) Nicolás Capaldo
CM	21	(Colombia) Jorman Campuzano		(substituted off) 60'
RW	22	(Colombia) Sebastián Villa	(yellow card) 87'
AM	19	(Argentina) Mauro Zárate		(substituted off) 84'
LW	8	(Colombia) Edwin Cardona		(substituted off) 66'
CF	9	(Argentina) Ramón Ábila		(substituted off) 83'
Substitutes:
GK	17	(Argentina) Agustín Rossi
DF	2	(Argentina) Lisandro López
DF	18	(Colombia) Frank Fabra
DF	20	(Argentina) Gastón Ávila
DF	29	(Argentina) Leonardo Jara
MF	11	(Argentina) Eduardo Salvio	(yellow card) 90+5'	(substituted on) 66'
MF	23	(Argentina) Diego González		(substituted on) 60'
MF	33	(Argentina) Alan Varela		(substituted on) 84'
FW	10	(Argentina) Carlos Tevez		(substituted on) 83'
FW	27	(Argentina) Franco Soldano
FW	30	(Argentina) Exequiel Zeballos
FW	34	(Argentina) Agustín Obando
Manager:
(Argentina) Miguel Ángel Russo

GK	1	(Colombia) Mauricio Arboleda
RB	32	(Argentina) Emanuel Coronel
CB	2	(Argentina) Alexis Maldonado
CB	6	(Argentina) Luciano Lollo
LB	3	(Argentina) Claudio Bravo	(yellow card) 57'	(substituted off) 90+3'
CM	30	(Argentina) Jorge Rodríguez (c)
CM	18	(Argentina) Giuliano Galoppo		(substituted off) 78'
AM	21	(Argentina) Martín Payero
RW	17	(Colombia) Mauricio Cuero		(substituted off) 78'
CF	9	(Argentina) Agustín Fontana
LW	7	(Argentina) Fabián Bordagaray		(substituted off) 64'
Substitutes:
GK	27	(Argentina) Facundo Altamirano
DF	4	(Argentina) Rodrigo Arciero
DF	19	(Argentina) Alexis Sosa
DF	24	(Argentina) Luciano Gómez
MF	5	(Argentina) Nicolás Linares
MF	10	(Argentina) Jesús Dátolo
MF	22	(Argentina) Juan Pablo Álvarez		(substituted on) 64'
MF	23	(Argentina) Jonás Gutiérrez
MF	25	(Argentina) Alejandro Cabrera
FW	11	(Argentina) Agustín Urzi		(substituted on) 78'
FW	29	(Argentina) Luciano Pons		(substituted on) 78'
FW	31	(Argentina) Mauricio Asenjo		(substituted on) 90+3'
Manager:
(Argentina) Javier Sanguinetti

Man of the Match:
Edwin Cardona (Boca Juniors)

Assistant referees:
Juan Pablo Belatti
Hernán Maidana
Fourth official:
Nicolás Lamolina
Reserve assistant referee:
Cristian Navarro

Match rules

- 90 minutes
- Penalty shoot-out if scores still level
- Twelve named substitutes
- Maximum of five substitutions

=== Statistics ===
Overall
Statistic	Boca Juniors	Banfield
Goals scored	1	1
Total shots	11	12
Shots on target	7	5
Ball possession	50%	50%
Corner kicks	2	4
Fouls committed	21	16
Offsides	1	0
Yellow cards	5	1
Red cards	1	0
