= 2019–20 Club Atlético Banfield season =

Banfield
2019–20 season
- President: Lucía Barbuto
- Manager: Hernán Crespo (until 2 September 2019); Julio César Falcioni (from 5 September 2019)
- Stadium: Estadio Florencio Sola
- Top goalscorer: League: Nicolás Bertolo (1); Sergio Vittor; Agustín Fontana; All: Nicolás Bertolo (1); Sergio Vittor; Agustín Fontana

The 2019–20 season is Banfield's 7th consecutive season in the top division of Argentine football. In addition to the Primera División, the club are competing in the Copa Argentina and Copa de la Superliga.

The season generally covers the period from 1 July 2019 to 30 June 2020.

== Review ==
=== Pre-season ===
The first player to announce his departure from Banfield was left-back Adrián Sporle, who agreed a move to Dundee United of the Scottish Championship on 13 June 2019. Adrián Calello followed Sporle out the door, as the defensive midfielder rejoined Huracán on 19 June. Esteban Conde's arrival from Nacional was set on 20 June, following the goalkeeper's exit from the Uruguayan outfit being confirmed a day before. Banfield met Victoriano Arenas in back-to-back friendlies on 22 June, with the first encounter ending in a four-goal victory before the second ended goalless. Jonás Gutiérrez made his unofficial bow against Victoriano Arenas, having been signed days prior. He was followed to the club by Hernán Toledo (Deportivo Maldonado) and Israel Damonte (Huracán).

Their second pre-season encounter took place on 26 June against Argentino, as they again scored four unanswered goals with Hernán Toledo netting on his first appearance; Banfield, like with Victoriano Arenas, faced Argentino twice, with the other fixture ending in a 1–1 draw. Chacarita Juniors of the second tier were beaten 2–1 on 29 June in the first of two friendlies, as Agustín Fontana netted twice to take his pre-season goal tally to five; game two ended in defeat. A number of players loaned in/out in the previous campaign returned on and around 30 June. Nicolás Silva departed on 1 July as he joined Argentinos Juniors. Banfield made it four wins from pre-season on 3 July, defeating Arsenal de Sarandí 3–0; a secondary meet ended goalless at the Estadio Florencio Sola.

Luciano Lollo was snapped up on loan from River Plate on 6 July. A 0–0 draw and a 2–3 loss occurred on 9 July in a friendly with Patronato. Banfield and Vélez Sarsfield swapped victories in friendlies on 13 July. Sebastián Dubarbier put pen to paper with Banfield on 13 July, having previously played in the Spanish Segunda División for Deportivo La Coruña. Sergio Vittor, a centre-back from Racing Club, was loaned in by Hernán Crespo on 17 July. Emanuel Coronel (Brown) and Michael López (Fénix) were loaned out on 19 July, as Denis Brizuela headed to Villa Dálmine. Another loan deal was confirmed on that date, with Facundo Altamirano going to Buenos Aires' Estudiantes. Banfield fought Atlético Tucumán twice on 20 July, winning 1–0 and drawing 2–2.

Julián Carranza was sold to Major League Soccer's Inter Miami on 26 July, though was immediately loaned back until the end of the year.

=== July ===
Banfield fell to defeat in the Primera División on their 2019–20 bow, losing one-nil away to Arsenal de Sarandí on 29 July.

=== August ===
Banfield and Talleres announced, on 1 August, a loan swap was agreed involving Martín Payero and Junior Arias, with the two switching clubs until 30 June 2020. A penalty from Nicolás Bertolo sealed three points in the league against Estudiantes on 4 August. Banfield beat Sacachispas in a friendly on 7 August, as a goal from Matías Moya was followed by a brace from Agustín Fontana. A friendly with Ferro Carril Oeste was cancelled on 9 August due to poor weather. Mauricio Asenjo completed a loan to Nueva Chicago on 14 August. Banfield made it back-to-back away defeats in the Primera División on 16 August, as they lost to Argentinos Juniors at the Estadio Diego Armando Maradona. Banfield lost to Boca Juniors on 25 August, having conceded after just twenty seconds.

On 31 August, Banfield and Defensa y Justicia played out a goalless draw in the league in Buenos Aires.

=== September ===
Hernán Crespo parted ways with Banfield on 2 September, following just one win in five matches to start 2019–20. Julio César Falcioni was revealed as Crespo's replacement on 5 September.

== Squad ==
Squad No.	Nationality	Name	Position(s)	Date of Birth (age)	Signed from
Goalkeepers
1	Colombia	Iván Arboleda	GK	21 April 1996 (age 30)	Deportivo Pasto
12	Argentina	Nicolás Sumavil	GK	20 November 1999 (age 26)	Academy
26	Argentina	Facundo Cambeses	GK	9 April 1997 (age 29)	Academy
33	Uruguay	Esteban Conde	GK	4 March 1983 (age 43)	Nacional
Defenders
2	Argentina	Renato Civelli	CB	14 October 1983 (age 43)	Lille
4	Argentina	Rodrigo Arciero	RB	12 March 1993 (age 33)	Patronato
6	Argentina	Luciano Lollo	CB	29 March 1987 (age 39)	River Plate (loan)
14	Argentina	Sergio Vittor	CB	9 June 1989 (age 37)	Racing Club (loan)
16	Argentina	Sebastián Dubarbier	LB	19 February 1986 (age 40)	Deportivo La Coruña
25	Argentina	Alexis Maldonado	CB	2 September 1997 (age 29)	Academy
30	Argentina	Jorge Rodríguez	CB	15 September 1995 (age 31)	Academy
32	Argentina	Franco Quinteros	DF	13 October 1998 (age 28)	Academy
37	Argentina	Federico Torres	DF	16 April 1999 (age 27)	Academy
	Argentina	Alexis Sosa	CB	22 July 1999 (age 27)	Academy
	Argentina	Rodrigo Tapia	CB	28 September 1994 (age 32)	San Lorenzo (loan)
Midfielders
3	Argentina	Claudio Bravo	LM	13 March 1997 (age 29)	Academy
5	Argentina	Israel Damonte	CM	6 January 1982 (age 44)	Huracán
8	Argentina	Nicolás Bertolo	LM	2 January 1986 (age 40)	River Plate
10	Argentina	Jesús Dátolo	LM	19 May 1984 (age 42)	Vitória
15	Argentina	Nicolás Linares	RM	6 March 1996 (age 30)	Academy
17	Argentina	Jonás Gutiérrez	LM	5 July 1983 (age 43)	Defensa y Justicia
18	Argentina	Giuliano Galoppo	AM	18 June 1999 (age 27)	Academy
24	Argentina	Luciano Gómez	AM	22 March 1996 (age 30)	Academy
27	Argentina	Matías Moya	AM	26 March 1998 (age 28)	River Plate (loan)
28	Nigeria	Feyiseitan Asagidigbi	MF	16 May 1999 (age 27)	Academy
31	Argentina	Lautaro Ríos	MF	9 October 2000 (age 26)	Academy
34	Argentina	Tomás Assennato	MF	23 July 1998 (age 28)	Academy
Forwards
7	Argentina	Claudio Villagra	LW	2 January 1997 (age 29)	Academy
9	Argentina	Agustín Fontana	CF	11 June 1996 (age 30)	Academy
11	Argentina	Hernán Toledo	LW	17 January 1996 (age 30)	Deportivo Maldonado (loan)
13	Uruguay	Junior Arias	CF	6 February 1993 (age 33)	Talleres (loan)
21	Argentina	Julián Carranza	CF	22 May 2000 (age 26)	Inter Miami (loan)
22	Argentina	Juan Álvarez	RW	10 February 1996 (age 30)	Academy
23	Colombia	Reinaldo Lenis	RW	20 July 1992 (age 34)	Sport Recife
35	Argentina	Agustín Urzi	RW	4 May 2000 (age 26)	Academy
36	Argentina	Juan Manuel Cruz	FW	19 July 1999 (age 27)	Academy
	Argentina	Sebastián Benega	RW	20 May 1999 (age 27)	Academy
	Argentina	Ignacio González	FW	25 August 2000 (age 26)	Academy
Out on loan					Loaned to
19	Argentina	Mauricio Asenjo	CF	23 July 1994 (age 32)	Nueva Chicago
29	Argentina	Martín Payero	CM	11 September 1998 (age 28)	Talleres
	Argentina	Facundo Altamirano	GK	21 March 1996 (age 30)	Estudiantes (BA)
	Argentina	Emanuel Coronel	LB	1 February 1997 (age 29)	Brown
	Argentina	Michael López	CF	19 August 1997 (age 29)	Fénix

== Transfers ==
Domestic transfer windows:
3 July 2019 to 24 September 2019
20 January 2020 to 19 February 2020.

=== Transfers in ===
Date from	Position	Nationality	Name	From	Ref.
3 July 2019 (Note: Deal agreed on 20 June 2019)	GK	Uruguay	Esteban Conde	Nacional	
3 July 2019 (Note: Deal agreed on 19 June 2019)	LM	Argentina	Jonás Gutiérrez	Defensa y Justicia	
3 July 2019 (Note: Deal agreed on 24 June 2019)	CM	Argentina	Israel Damonte	Huracán	
13 July 2019	LB	Argentina	Sebastián Dubarbier	Deportivo La Coruña	

=== Transfers out ===
Date from	Position	Nationality	Name	To	Ref.
13 June 2019	LB	Argentina	Adrián Sporle	Dundee United	
3 July 2019 (Note: Deal agreed on 19 June 2019)	DM	Argentina	Adrián Calello	Huracán	
3 July 2019 (Note: Deal agreed on 1 July 2019)	RW	Argentina	Nicolás Silva	Argentinos Juniors	
19 July 2019	MF	Argentina	Denis Brizuela	Villa Dálmine	
26 July 2019	CF	Argentina	Julián Carranza	Inter Miami	

=== Loans in ===
Start date	Position	Nationality	Name	From	End date	Ref.
3 July 2019 (Note: Deal agreed on 19 June 2019)	LW	Argentina	Hernán Toledo	Deportivo Maldonado	30 June 2020	
6 July 2019	CB	Argentina	Luciano Lollo	River Plate	30 June 2020	
17 July 2019	CB	Argentina	Sergio Vittor	Racing Club	30 June 2020	
26 July 2019	CF	Argentina	Julián Carranza	Inter Miami	31 December 2019	
1 August 2019	CF	Uruguay	Junior Arias	Talleres	30 June 2020	

=== Loans out ===
Start date	Position	Nationality	Name	To	End date	Ref.
19 July 2019	LB	Argentina	Emanuel Coronel	Brown	30 June 2020	
19 July 2019	CF	Argentina	Michael López	Fénix	30 June 2020	
19 July 2019	GK	Argentina	Facundo Altamirano	Estudiantes (BA)	30 June 2020	
1 August 2019	CM	Argentina	Martín Payero	Talleres	30 June 2020	
14 August 2019	CF	Argentina	Mauricio Asenjo	Nueva Chicago	30 June 2020	

== Friendlies ==
=== Pre-season ===
In early June 2019, exhibition matches were announced with Arsenal de Sarandí (3 July) and Patronato (9 July). On 19 June, Banfield added further friendlies with Victoriano Arenas (22 June), Chacarita Juniors (29 June), Vélez Sarsfield, Atlético Tucumán and an unknown opponent; though the latter never took place. The venue for the Chacarita friendly was confirmed on 23 July. Games with Argentino were scheduled on 20 June. Details for the Vélez Sarsfield encounter were released on 8 July.

Win Draw Loss

22 June 2019 Friendly	Banfield	4–0	Victoriano Arenas	Luis Guillón, Argentina
	M. Asenjo; A. Fontana; M. Moya	Banfield; InfoRegión		Stadium: Campo de Deportes Alfredo Palacios

22 June 2019 Friendly	Banfield	0–0	Victoriano Arenas	Luis Guillón, Argentina
		Banfield; InfoRegión		Stadium: Campo de Deportes Alfredo Palacios

26 June 2019 Friendly	Banfield	1–1	Argentino	Luis Guillón, Argentina
	N. Bertolo	Banfield; TyC Sports	Goal	Stadium: Campo de Deportes Alfredo Palacios

26 June 2019 Friendly	Banfield	4–0	Argentino	Luis Guillón, Argentina
	A. Fontana; A. Urzi; H. Toledo	Banfield; TyC Sports		Stadium: Campo de Deportes Alfredo Palacios

29 June 2019 Friendly	Banfield	2–1	Chacarita Juniors	Luis Guillón, Argentina
09:39 GMT-3	A. Fontana	Banfield; TyC Sports; 80 min. match	J. Mascia	Stadium: Campo de Deportes Alfredo Palacios

29 June 2019 Friendly	Banfield	1–2	Chacarita Juniors	Luis Guillón, Argentina
	F. Tallarico (o.g.)	Banfield; TyC Sports; 80 min. match	L. Lezcano; M. Paredes	Stadium: Campo de Deportes Alfredo Palacios

3 July 2019 Friendly	Banfield	3–0	Arsenal de Sarandí	Banfield, Argentina
	N. Bertolo; C. Bravo; M. Payero	Banfield; Olé		Stadium: Estadio Florencio Sola

3 July 2019 Friendly	Banfield	0–0	Arsenal de Sarandí	Banfield, Argentina
		Banfield; Olé		Stadium: Estadio Florencio Sola

9 July 2019 Friendly	Banfield	0–0	Patronato	Banfield, Argentina
		Banfield; TyC Sports		Stadium: Estadio Florencio Sola

9 July 2019 Friendly	Banfield	2–3	Patronato	Banfield, Argentina
	C. Villagra; J. Dátolo	Banfield; TyC Sports	C. Tarragona; P. Cortizo; A. Pastorelli	Stadium: Estadio Florencio Sola

13 July 2019 Friendly	Vélez Sarsfield	1–0	Banfield	Ituzaingó, Argentina
10:00 GMT-3	Á. Barreal	Banfield; Fox Sports		Stadium: Villa Olímpica

13 July 2019 Friendly	Vélez Sarsfield	0–1	Banfield	Ituzaingó, Argentina
		Banfield; Fox Sports	E. Coronel	Stadium: Villa Olímpica

20 July 2019 Friendly	Banfield	1–0	Atlético Tucumán	Banfield, Argentina
	A. Fontana	Banfield; Olé; 80 min. match		Stadium: Estadio Florencio Sola

20 July 2019 Friendly	Banfield	2–2	Atlético Tucumán	Banfield, Argentina
	M. Ortiz; R. Lenis	Banfield; Olé; 80 min. match	J. Carranza; T. Cuello	Stadium: Estadio Florencio Sola

Friendly	Banfield	Cancelled	TBA	Argentina

=== Mid-season ===
Ferro Carril Oeste were pencilled in for a mid-season friendly match on 6 August 2019 for 10 August, though was later moved to a day prior. Before facing Ferro, Banfield would meet Sacachispas.

Win Draw Loss

7 August 2019 Friendly	Banfield	3–1	Sacachispas	Luis Guillón, Argentina
	M. Moya; A. Fontana	Banfield; 80 min. match	Goal	Stadium: Campo de Deportes Alfredo Palacios

9 August 2019 Friendly	Banfield	Cancelled	Ferro Carril Oeste	Luis Guillón, Argentina
		Ferro Carril Oeste		Stadium: Campo de Deportes Alfredo Palacios

== Competitions ==
=== Primera División ===
==== League table ====
Pos	Team	Pld	W	D	L	GF	GA	GD	Pts
15	Atlético Tucumán	23	7	8	8	22	25	−3	29
16	Unión	23	7	6	10	21	30	−9	27
17	Banfield	23	6	8	9	19	23	−4	26
18	Central Córdoba (SdE)	23	6	8	9	21	29	−8	26
19	Gimnasia y Esgrima (LP)	23	6	5	12	22	23	−1	23

Source: AFA
Rules for classification: 1) points; 2) play-off (only if needed to decide championship); 3) goal difference; 4) goals scored; 5) head-to-head points; 6) head-to-head goal difference; 7) head-to-head goals scored.

==== Relegation table ====
Pos	Team	2017–18 Pts	2018–19 Pts	2019–20 Pts	Total Pts	Total Pld	Avg	Relegation
18	Patronato	33	26	10	69	57	1.211	
19	Newell's Old Boys	29	29	9	67	56	1.196	
20	Banfield	35	29	4	68	57	1.193	
21	Colón	41	23	4	68	57	1.193	
22	Rosario Central	32	26	9	67	57	1.175	Relegation to Primera B Nacional

Source: AFA

==== Results summary ====
Overall								Home						Away					
Pld	W	D	L	GF	GA	GD	Pts	W	D	L	GF	GA	GD	W	D	L	GF	GA	GD
5	1	1	3	3	5	−2	4	1	0	1	1	1	0	0	1	2	2	4	−2

Last updated: 31 August 2019.
Source: Soccerway

==== Matches ====
The fixtures for the 2019–20 campaign were released on 10 July.

Win Draw Loss

29 July 2019 1	Arsenal de Sarandí	1–0	Banfield	Sarandí, Argentina
19:00 GMT-3	E. Rescaldani 44' (pen.)	Banfield; Infobae; Soccerway		Stadium: Estadio Julio Humberto Grondona; Referee: Hernán Mastrángelo (Argentina)

4 August 2019 2	Banfield	1–0	Estudiantes	Banfield, Argentina
15:30 GMT-3	N. Bertolo 45' (pen.)	Banfield; Infobae; Soccerway		Stadium: Estadio Florencio Sola; Referee: Nazareno Arasa (Argentina)

17 August 2019 3	Argentinos Juniors	3–2	Banfield	Buenos Aires, Argentina
19:00 GMT-3	D. Batallini 22'; L. Lollo 41' (o.g.); G. Hauche 70'	Banfield; Infobae; Soccerway	S. Vittor 45+1'; A. Fontana 90'	Stadium: Estadio Diego Armando Maradona; Referee: Andrés Merlos (Argentina)

25 August 2019 4	Banfield	0–1	Boca Juniors	Banfield, Argentina
20:00 GMT-3		Banfield; Infobae; Soccerway	F. Soldano 1'	Stadium: Estadio Florencio Sola; Referee: Fernando Echenique (Argentina)

30 August 2019 5	Defensa y Justicia	0–0	Banfield	Buenos Aires, Argentina
21:10 GMT-3		Banfield; Infobae; Soccerway		Stadium: Estadio Norberto "Tito" Tomaghello; Referee: Darío Herrera (Argentina)

6	Banfield	–	Talleres	Banfield, Argentina
				Stadium: Estadio Florencio Sola

=== Copa Argentina ===
Win Draw Loss

Banfield were drawn to meet divisional rivals Talleres in the round of thirty-two in the Copa Argentina, with the encounter getting a date of 10 September; though it was originally tentatively scheduled for August.

10 September 2019 R32	Talleres	–	Banfield	Argentina

=== Copa de la Superliga ===
Win Draw Loss

	–
00:00 GMT-3

== Squad statistics ==
=== Appearances and goals ===
No.	Pos.	Nationality	Name	League		Cup		League Cup		Continental		Total		Discipline		Ref
No.	Pos.	Nationality	Name	Apps	Goals	Apps	Goals	Apps	Goals	Apps	Goals	Apps	Goals	Yellow card	Red card	Ref
1	GK	Colombia	Iván Arboleda	0	0	0	0	0	0	—		0	0	0	0	
2	CB	Argentina	Renato Civelli	5	0	0	0	0	0	—		5	0	1	0	
3	LM	Argentina	Claudio Bravo	4	0	0	0	0	0	—		4	0	2	0	
4	RB	Argentina	Rodrigo Arciero	2	0	0	0	0	0	—		2	0	1	0	
5	CM	Argentina	Israel Damonte	0(1)	0	0	0	0	0	—		0(1)	0	0	0	
6	CB	Argentina	Luciano Lollo	3	0	0	0	0	0	—		3	0	1	0	
7	LW	Argentina	Claudio Villagra	0(2)	0	0	0	0	0	—		0(2)	0	0	0	
8	LM	Argentina	Nicolás Bertolo	5	1	0	0	0	0	—		5	1	0	0	
9	CF	Argentina	Agustín Fontana	1(3)	1	0	0	0	0	—		1(3)	1	0	0	
10	LM	Argentina	Jesús Dátolo	2	0	0	0	0	0	—		2	0	0	0	
12	GK	Argentina	Nicolás Sumavil	0	0	0	0	0	0	—		0	0	0	0	
13	CF	Uruguay	Junior Arias	4	0	0	0	0	0	—		4	0	1	0	
14	CB	Argentina	Sergio Vittor	5	1	0	0	0	0	—		5	1	2	0	
15	RM	Argentina	Nicolás Linares	0	0	0	0	0	0	—		0	0	0	0	
16	LB	Argentina	Sebastián Dubarbier	1(1)	0	0	0	0	0	—		1(1)	0	1	0	
17	LMM	Argentina	Jonás Gutiérrez	0(4)	0	0	0	0	0	—		0(4)	0	0	0	
18	AM	Argentina	Giuliano Galoppo	0	0	0	0	0	0	—		0	0	0	0	
19	CF	Argentina	Mauricio Asenjo	0	0	0	0	0	0	—		0	0	0	0	
21	CF	Argentina	Julián Carranza	0(1)	0	0	0	0	0	—		0(1)	0	0	0	
22	RW	Argentina	Juan Álvarez	4	0	0	0	0	0	—		4	0	1	0	
23	RW	Colombia	Reinaldo Lenis	0	0	0	0	0	0	—		0	0	0	0	
24	AM	Argentina	Luciano Gómez	5	0	0	0	0	0	—		5	0	2	0	
25	CB	Argentina	Alexis Maldonado	0	0	0	0	0	0	—		0	0	0	0	
26	GK	Argentina	Facundo Cambeses	0	0	0	0	0	0	—		0	0	0	0	
27	AM	Argentina	Matías Moya	1(2)	0	0	0	0	0	—		1(2)	0	0	0	
28	MF	Nigeria	Feyiseitan Asagidigbi	0	0	0	0	0	0	—		0	0	0	0	
29	CM	Argentina	Martín Payero	0(1)	0	0	0	0	0	—		0(1)	0	0	0	
30	CB	Argentina	Jorge Rodríguez	5	0	0	0	0	0	—		5	0	0	0	
31	MF	Argentina	Lautaro Ríos	0	0	0	0	0	0	—		0	0	0	0	
32	DF	Argentina	Franco Quinteros	0	0	0	0	0	0	—		0	0	0	0	
33	GK	Uruguay	Esteban Conde	5	0	0	0	0	0	—		5	0	0	0	
34	MF	Argentina	Tomás Assennato	0	0	0	0	0	0	—		0	0	0	0	
35	RW	Argentina	Agustín Urzi	3	0	0	0	0	0	—		3	0	2	0	
36	FW	Argentina	Juan Manuel Cruz	0	0	0	0	0	0	—		0	0	0	0	
37	DF	Argentina	Federico Torres	0	0	0	0	0	0	—		0	0	0	0	
–	GK	Argentina	Facundo Altamirano	0	0	0	0	0	0	—		0	0	0	0	
–	RW	Argentina	Sebastián Benega	0	0	0	0	0	0	—		0	0	0	0	
–	LB	Argentina	Emanuel Coronel	0	0	0	0	0	0	—		0	0	0	0	
–	FW	Argentina	Ignacio González	0	0	0	0	0	0	—		0	0	0	0	
–	CF	Argentina	Michael López	0	0	0	0	0	0	—		0	0	0	0	
–	CB	Argentina	Alexis Sosa	0	0	0	0	0	0	—		0	0	0	0	
–	CB	Argentina	Rodrigo Tapia	0	0	0	0	0	0	—		0	0	0	0	
–	LW	Argentina	Hernán Toledo	0	0	0	0	0	0	—		0	0	0	0	
Own goals				—	0	—	0	—	0	—		—	0	—	—	—

Statistics accurate as of 31 August 2019.

=== Goalscorers ===
Rank	Pos	No.	Nat	Name	League	Cup	League Cup	Continental	Total	Ref
1	LM	8	Argentina	Nicolás Bertolo	1	0	0	–	1	
1	CB	14	Argentina	Sergio Vittor	1	0	0	–	1	
1	CF	9	Argentina	Agustín Fontana	1	0	0	–	1	
Own goals					0	0	0	–	0	
Totals					3	0	0	–	3	—
