= Dani Osvaldo =

Footballer (born 1986)

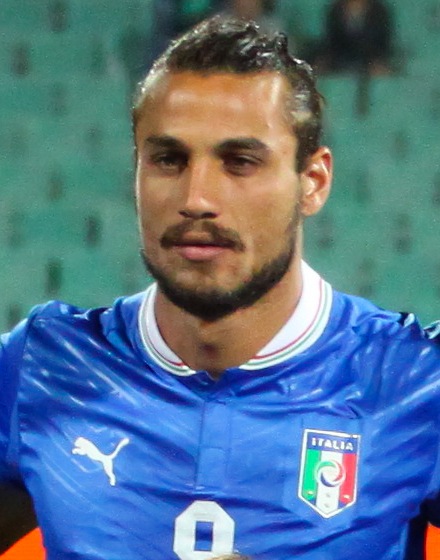
- Osvaldo with Italy in 2012

Personal information
- Full name: Pablo Daniel Osvaldo
- Date of birth: 12 January 1986 (age 40)
- Place of birth: Lanús, Argentina
- Height: 1.83 m (6 ft 0 in)
- Position: Striker

Youth career
- 1995–1999: Lanús
- 1999–2000: Banfield
- 2000–2005: Huracán

Senior career*
Years	Team	Apps	(Gls)
2005	Huracán	33	(11)
2006	Atalanta	3	(1)
2006–2007	Lecce	31	(8)
2007–2009	Fiorentina	21	(5)
2009–2010	Bologna	25	(3)
2010	→ Espanyol (loan)	20	(7)
2010–2011	Espanyol	24	(13)
2011–2013	Roma	55	(27)
2013–2015	Southampton	13	(3)
2014	→ Juventus (loan)	11	(1)
2014–2015	→ Internazionale (loan)	12	(5)
2015	→ Boca Juniors (loan)	11	(3)
2015–2016	Porto	7	(1)
2016	Boca Juniors	3	(0)
2020	Banfield	2	(0)
Total		271	(88)

International career
2007–2008	Italy U21	12	(2)
2011–2014	Italy	14	(4)
- * Club domestic league appearances and goals

Pablo Daniel "Dani" Osvaldo (Italian pronunciation: [ˈdaːni oˈzvaldo]; born 12 January 1986) is a former professional footballer who played as a striker. Born and raised in Argentina, Osvaldo represented the Italy national team internationally.

Osvaldo began his career at Huracán in 2005 and the following year moved to Italy in a co-ownership deal between Serie B clubs Atalanta and Lecce, later playing in the top flight for Fiorentina and Bologna. After a loan to Espanyol, he joined the Spanish club on a permanent basis before earning a return to Italy to Roma for an initial fee of €15 million in 2011. He spent two seasons at the club and was then signed by Southampton, where he spent most of his time out on loan, at Juventus, Internazionale and Boca Juniors, before joining Porto. He returned to Boca in January 2016, but was later sacked by the club in May.

Osvaldo qualified to represent Italy through his ancestry, having played initially for the nation's under-21 team before making his senior debut in 2011.

At times, Osvaldo has been disciplined for having participated in various ferocious incidents with opponents, teammates and managers.

== Club career ==
=== Early career ===
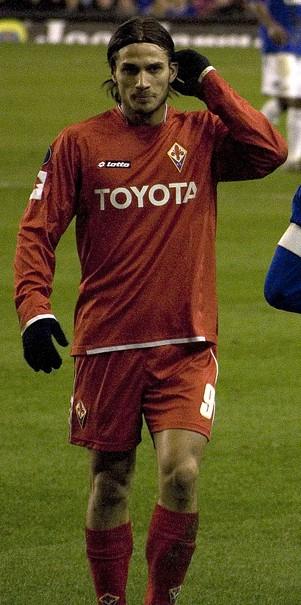
Osvaldo playing for Fiorentina in 2008

Osvaldo made his debut with Huracán in 2005. After less than a year, he was signed by Italian side Atalanta, playing three matches in the 2005–06 Serie B season. In 2006, Atalanta agreed to a co-ownership deal which sent the player to Lecce, another Serie B team, where Osvaldo had the opportunity to play regularly, scoring eight goals in 31 appearances with the Giallorossi.

Atalanta subsequently regained the full player's property and sold him to Fiorentina for €4.6 million.

On 2 March 2008, Osvaldo headed in a cross from teammate Papa Waigo to give Fiorentina a 3–2 win in stoppage time over fierce rivals Juventus. He was then sent off for his goal celebration with a second yellow card, after having been booked earlier in the match, when he removed his team jersey and pretended to machine gun his own fans in a similar fashion to Fiorentina legend Gabriel Batistuta's goal celebration. His most important goal was a spectacular overhead kick against Torino on 18 May 2008.

Osvaldo left Fiorentina on 20 January 2009 and joined Bologna on loan for €2 million. At the end of season, Bologna bought him for an additional €5 million, signing a four-year contract with the club. On 23 August 2009, Osvaldo scored the season-opening goal for Bologna against his former club Fiorentina and earned his team a point in the draw.

=== Espanyol ===
On 10 January 2010, Spanish club Espanyol announced that they had signed the Italo-Argentine forward on loan until June 2010, pending a medical examination. He made his La Liga debut when he came on as a 54th-minute substitute for Iván Alonso in the 0–2 away defeat to Osasuna.

On 3 June 2010, Osvaldo's loan was extended for another season, for €500,000, weeks after the player declared his interest of staying in Spain. On 31 August, Osvaldo's loan deal with Espanyol was turned into a five-year deal for a fee worth €4.6 million.

=== Roma ===
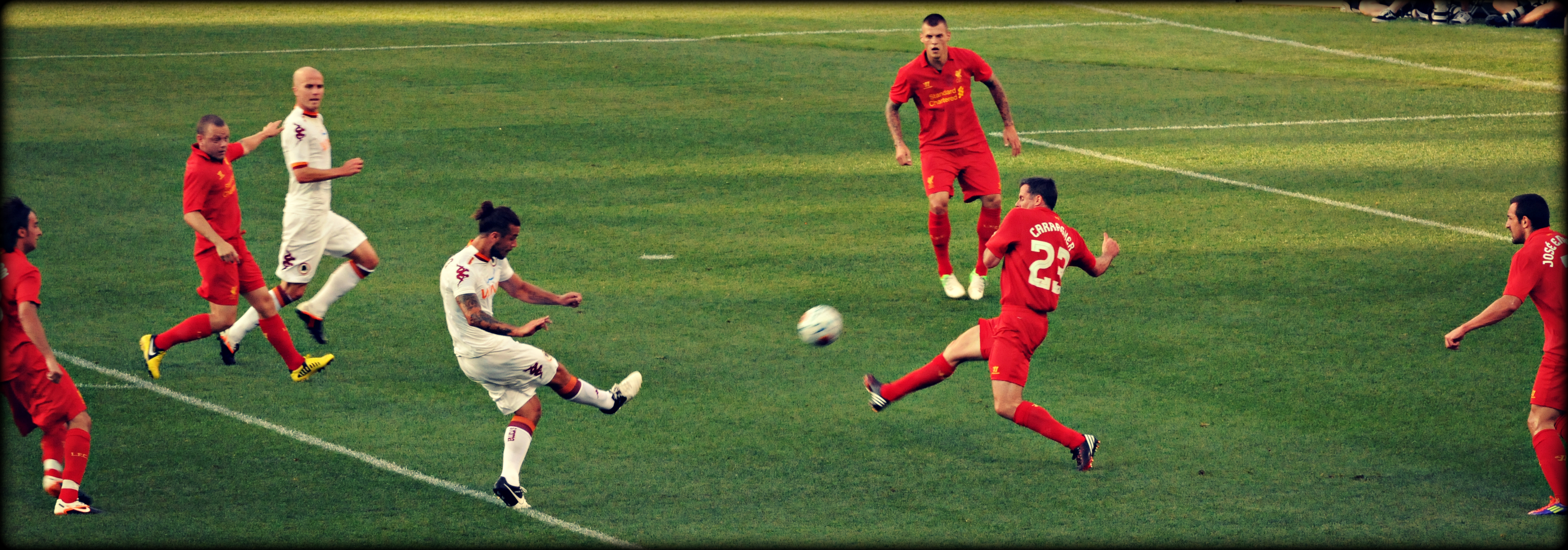
Osvaldo shoots in a pre-season friendly against Liverpool in 2012

On 25 August 2011, Osvaldo was sold to Roma for a fee of €15 million plus bonuses, whereby the bonus for goals (€500,000) and appearances (€250,000 each for 25th and 50th appearances; up to 100th) had been fully and partially activated; Roma also has the obligation to pay an additional €1 million if the team had qualifies for one of the Champions League seasons from 2012–13 to 2016–17, regardless of whether or not Osvaldo was a player of Roma at that time. On 22 September 2011, Osvaldo scored his first goal for the Lupi against Siena in a home game that ended 1–1. On 16 October, Osvaldo opened the scoring against Rome rivals Lazio in the Derby della Capitale. He scored his fifth goal against Novara on 5 November.

On 25 November, Osvaldo was apparently angry with teammate Erik Lamela after not receiving a pass during the 0–2 defeat at Udinese and was fined and suspended by his club for "punching Lamela in the face." On 19 March 2012, after three months, he scored again in a 1–0 victory over Genoa. He scored in the 2–1 loss against Milan and a week later in a 5–2 victory over Novara. He also scored the opening goal in a 3–1 victory over Udinese.

Osvaldo opened the 2012–13 season with a goal against Catania in a 2–2 draw. On 2 September 2012, he scored his second goal of the season against Internazionale in a match that saw Roma win 3–1 against the Nerazzurri at the San Siro. He scored his third league goal, a penalty, against Juventus in a 4–1 defeat at the Juventus Stadium. He scored a brace in a 4–2 win over Genoa and scored his sixth goal of the season in a 4–1 win against Palermo on 4 November. He also scored a goal against former club Fiorentina for a 4–2 win for Roma.

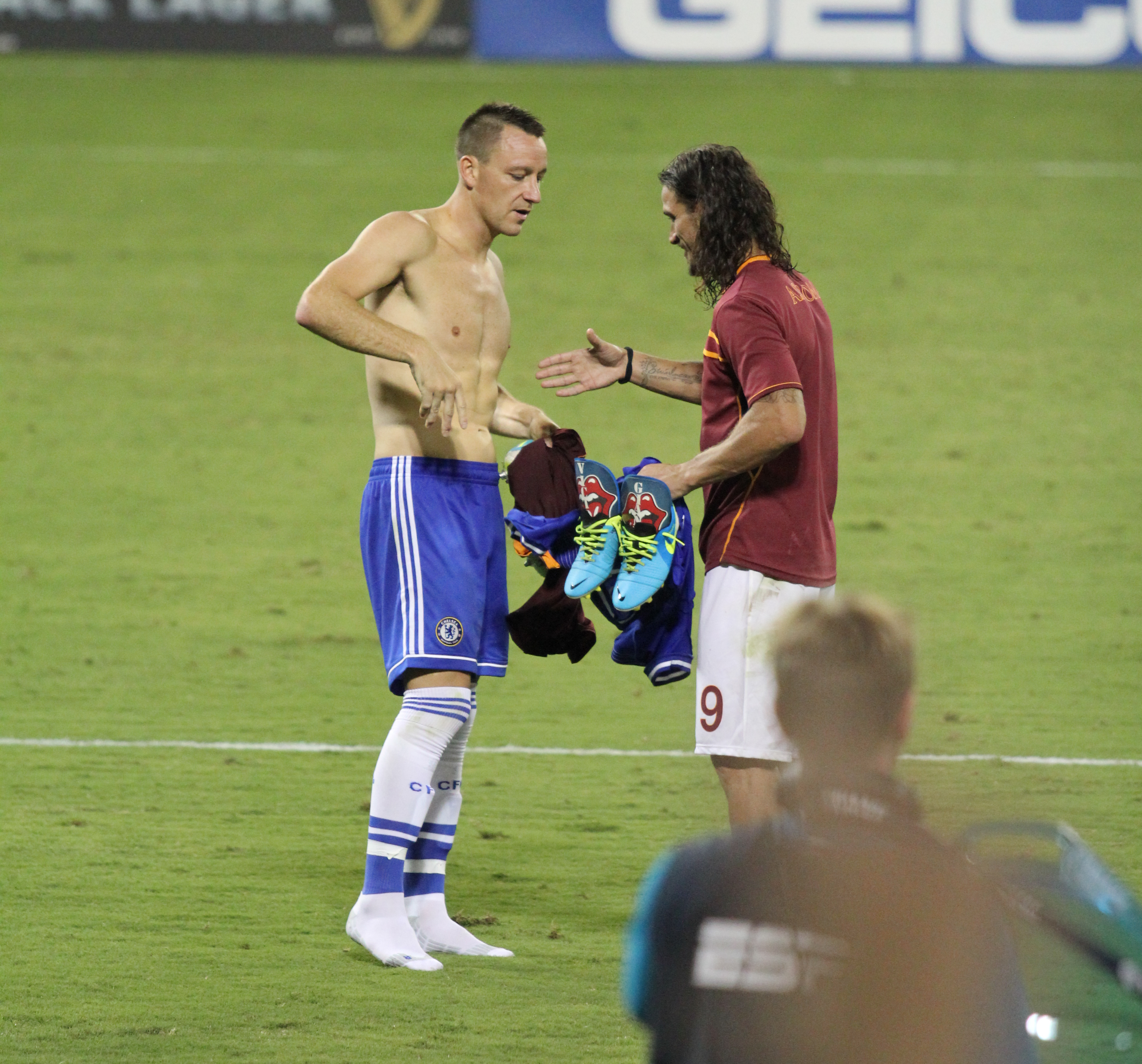
Osvaldo shakes hands with John Terry after a pre-season friendly against Chelsea in 2013

On 28 April 2013, Osvaldo scored his first hat-trick in Serie A against Siena in a convincing 4–0 home victory. Osvaldo finished the domestic season with a team-leading 16 goals, one over teammate Erik Lamela's 15, as Roma finished in sixth place.

In the club's 2013 Coppa Italia final loss to Lazio (1–0), Osvaldo allegedly shouted at and insulted caretaking manager Aurelio Andreazzoli after the match for only being given 15 minutes of playing time off the substitutes' bench. Osvaldo also refused to attend the Coppa Italia awards ceremony in protest to the manager's decision.

=== Southampton ===
Osvaldo signed for Southampton on 18 August 2013 on a four-year deal for a €15.1 (£12.8) million fee plus bonuses up to €2 million. Upon joining Southampton, Osvaldo was reunited with manager Mauricio Pochettino, who had managed him at Espanyol. He made his debut on 24 August in a 1–1 draw with Sunderland, coming on as a substitute at the start of the second half. His first goal came in a 2–0 win over Crystal Palace in September, his second in early December in a 3–2 home loss to Aston Villa, and the next three days later in a 1–1 draw with Manchester City, when The Guardian's reporter described how he "bewildered Vincent Kompany before scoring with an exquisite lob from the corner of the box".

On 3 January 2014, Osvaldo was fined £40,000 and banned for three matches after taking part in a touch-line fracas in the match against Newcastle United on 14 December, for which an FA independent regulatory commission found him "guilty of violent conduct." Three weeks later, Southampton announced they had suspended Osvaldo for two weeks following an undisclosed training ground incident, later revealed to have been a fight with teammate José Fonte, ostensibly "instigated by [Osvaldo]."

Following his departure, Osvaldo admitted that he had struggled to adapt to playing in England, describing English football as a "very physical type of game, with really tough tackling."

On 1 July 2015, Southampton announced that they had terminated Osvaldo's contract.

==== Juventus (loan) ====
On 31 January 2014, Osvaldo returned to Italy by signing on a free loan to Juventus for the remainder of the 2013–14 season, with the club having until 31 May 2014 to buy the rights to the player at the price of €19 million. Manager Antonio Conte revealed that Osvaldo willingly accepted a pay-cut to join the club.

Osvaldo made his Juventus debut on 9 February against Hellas Verona, coming on as a substitute for Fernando Llorente in the 65th minute of a 2–2 draw. In the Round of 32 of the Europa League, Osvaldo scored in both legs as Juventus beat Trabzonspor 4–0 on aggregate. In the final away game against Roma on 11 May, Osvaldo scored the only goal of the game in the fourth minute of added time, seconds away from the end of the match. This was the only goal of 11 league matches in his loan spell.

==== Internazionale (loan) ====
On 4 August 2014, Osvaldo returned again to Italy by signing on a free loan to Internazionale for the 2014–15 season, with Saphir Taïder moving in the opposite direction to Southampton. He scored his first goal on the 28th, the third of a 6–0 win over Stjarnan of Iceland which qualified Inter to the group stages of the Europa League. Three days later he featured in Serie A for the club for the first time, replacing fellow debutant Yann M'Vila after 56 minutes of a goalless draw at Torino. In his second league match on 14 September, he scored twice as Inter defeated Sassuolo 7–0 at the San Siro. He scored the winner in a 2–1 victory over Dnipro Dnipropetrovsk on 27 November, a result which confirmed that Inter would top their Europa League group with a game remaining. He was suspended by Inter on 21 January 2015 for not turning up to training for two days and not providing a reason for his absence, while previously being ostracised from the squad after falling out with strike partner Mauro Icardi.

==== Boca Juniors (loan) ====
On 13 February 2015, Osvaldo returned to Argentina by signing on loan to Boca Juniors until the end of June. He said that playing for the club "was always a lifelong dream". Osvaldo scored in his debut for the side against Montevideo Wanderers in a Copa Libertadores match on 26 February. He scored his second and third goal against Zamora on 11 March, again in the Copa Libertadores.

=== Porto ===
On 5 August 2015, Osvaldo joined Portuguese side Porto on a free transfer, following his release by Southampton. He scored his first goal for the Primeira Liga team on 4 October, as a substitute for Vincent Aboubakar in a 4–0 home win over Belenenses.

=== Boca Juniors ===
Osvaldo returned to Boca Juniors in January 2016, but in May he had his contract terminated after arguing with coach Guillermo Barros Schelotto after being caught smoking in the dressing room.

=== Retirement ===
On 31 August 2016, after Osvaldo had been a free agent for around three months, Italy's Rai Sport claimed that Serie A club Chievo tried to sign the former Southampton striker, but Osvaldo told the club that he had retired from football to focus on his music career.

=== Return to Argentine football ===
On 6 January 2020, Osvaldo came out of retirement after four years to play for Primera División club, Banfield for the first time since 1999, in his youth career. He signed a one-year contract with the club. He departed in July 2020.

== International career ==
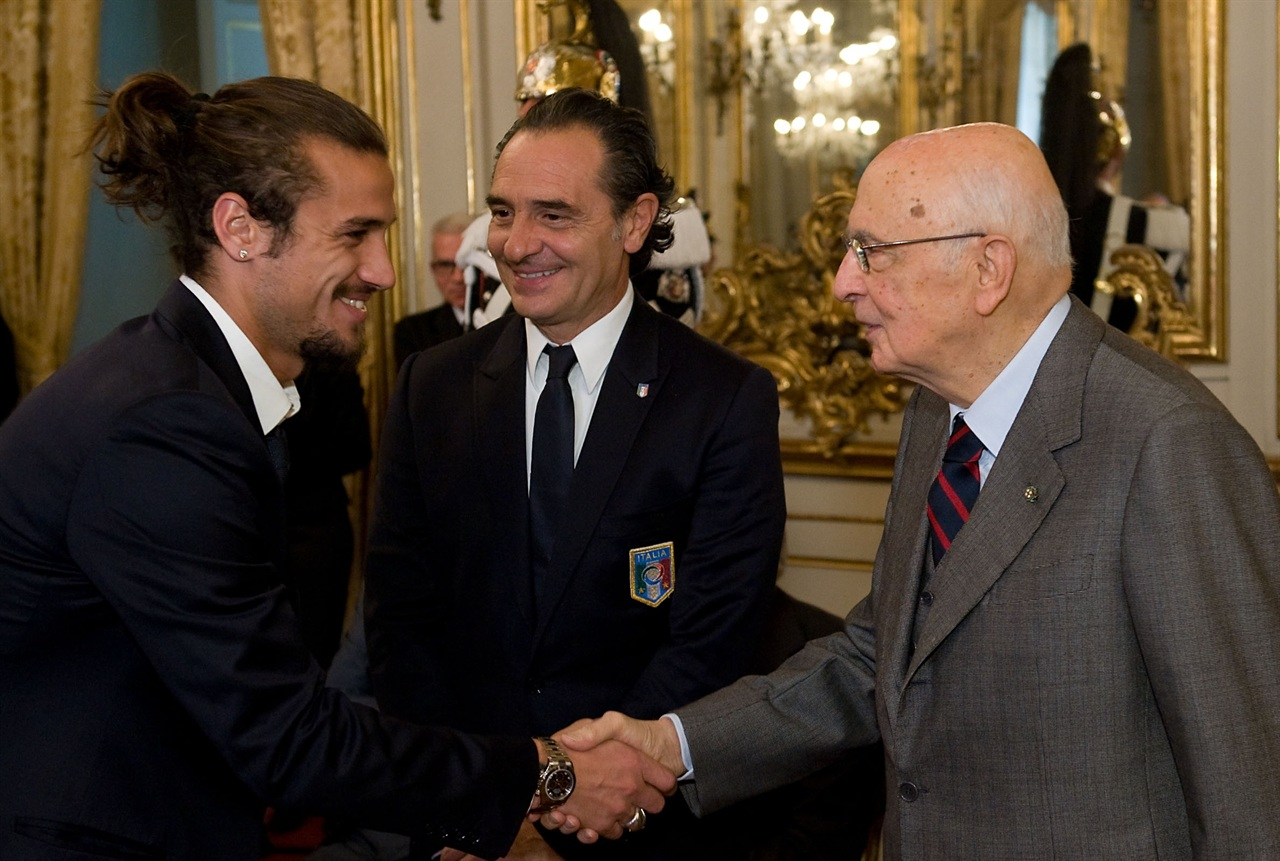
Osvaldo and Italy national team manager Cesare Prandelli meeting the nation's president, Giorgio Napolitano, in April 2012

Osvaldo qualified for Italian citizenship through a great-grandfather who was born in Filottrano, Marche and emigrated to Argentina in the 19th century. Osvaldo had previously played for the Italy U21 national team in the team's victorious 2008 Toulon Tournament campaign, putting on a Man of the Match performance and scoring the only goal in a 1–0 victory over Chile in the final.

On 5 October 2011, due to the injuries that caused the withdrawal of regular strikers Mario Balotelli and Giampaolo Pazzini, Osvaldo received his first call-up to play for the Italy senior national team for UEFA Euro 2012 qualifying matches against Serbia and Northern Ireland. Speaking of criticism by Lega Nord politicians for his decision to play for Italy, Osvaldo said: "The criticism from politicians is ridiculous. I have an Italian wife, Italian children and an Italian family and I also play in Serie A. Moreover, I have already sung the national anthem for the Under-21 team. I would have no problem facing Argentina in the future because it would mean I would be a part of the Italian national team." On 11 October 2011, he made his debut in the 3–0 victory over Northern Ireland.

National team manager Cesare Prandelli dropped him from the squad after reports surfaced of Osvaldo shouting at his Roma coach, Aurelio Andreazzoli, during Roma's 1–0 defeat to Lazio in the 2013 Coppa Italia final. Osvaldo skipped the awards ceremony and then attacked Andreazzoli on Twitter.

He was recalled by Prandelli for the 2014 World Cup qualifiers against Bulgaria and Malta. He netted his first two international goals for the Azzurri away against Bulgaria within the space of four minutes to put Italy in front after being a goal down early on. He added two more goals in the qualification campaign, almost exactly a year apart, away against Armenia, and Denmark. In the home qualifier against Denmark, on 16 October 2012 at the San Siro, Osvaldo was given a straight red card early in the second half for an elbow on Nicolai Stokholm.

Osvaldo was not selected by Prandelli for the squad that contested the 2013 FIFA Confederations Cup in Brazil, nor for the following year's World Cup.

== Style of play ==
Described as a "modern", quick, tenacious, and physically strong striker, with good technique and dribbling skills, Osvaldo was capable of playing anywhere along the front line, due to his intelligent movement, positional sense, and his ability to make attacking runs. He was primarily known for his heading accuracy, his acrobatic ability in the air, and for his powerful and accurate striking ability both inside or outside the area, with both feet. In addition to his goalscoring ability, he was also capable of using his strength and control to link up with and play off of other forwards, and hold up the ball with his back to goal, to lay it off for teammates and provide them with assists. His former coach Zdeněk Zeman has described him as "a force of nature". Osvaldo also drew criticism throughout his career, however, for his inconsistency, aggressive character and lack of discipline, which led him to be involved in several confrontations with managers, opponents, teammates, and officials.

== Personal life ==
Osvaldo met the Argentine actress Jimena Barón by phone, under the suggestion of actress Eugenia Tobal. He was playing in Italy at the time, and returned to Argentina to meet her under the pretense of a legal problem. She left the cast of Sos mi hombre and moved to Italy with him, and he left his wife Elena Braccini and his two daughters. He had a son with Jimena, and both of them returned to Argentina when he signed for Boca Juniors. He broke up with Barón in 2015, under controversial circumstances.

Osvaldo has expressed his interest in music, with "Wild Horses" by the Rolling Stones being his favourite song. Osvaldo also has interest in playing the guitar. Osvaldo's favourite rock bands are Rolling Stones, The Beatles, The Doors, AC/DC and Guns N' Roses.

=== Health ===
In March 2024, Osvaldo revealed that he had been undergoing treatment for his struggles with depression, which had led to his addictions to alcohol and drugs.

On 24 September 2026, Osvaldo was hospitalised with a pleural effusion and underwent an operation, with his family stating on 26 September he had a "favourable development" following the operation.

== Career statistics ==
=== Club ===
Appearances and goals by club, season and competition
Club	Season	League			Cup		Continental		Total	
Club	Season	Division	Apps	Goals	Apps	Goals	Apps	Goals	Apps	Goals
Huracán	2004–05	Primera B Nacional	33	11	0	0	–		33	11
Atalanta	2005–06	Serie B	3	1	0	0	–		3	1
Lecce	2006–07	Serie B	31	8	1	0	–		32	8
Fiorentina	2007–08	Serie A	13	5	4	0	8	1	25	6
Fiorentina	2008–09	Serie A	8	0	0	0	5	0	13	0
Fiorentina	Total		21	5	4	0	13	1	38	6
Bologna	2008–09	Serie A	12	0	0	0	–		12	0
Bologna	2009–10	Serie A	13	3	1	0	–		14	3
Bologna	Total		25	3	1	0	–		26	3
Espanyol	2009–10	La Liga	20	7	0	0	–		20	7
Espanyol	2010–11	La Liga	24	13	2	1	–		26	14
Espanyol	Total		44	20	2	1	–		46	21
Roma	2011–12	Serie A	26	11	0	0	–		26	11
Roma	2012–13	Serie A	29	16	2	1	–		31	17
Roma	Total		55	27	2	1	–		57	28
Southampton	2013–14	Premier League	13	3	0	0	0	0	13	3
Juventus (loan)	2013–14	Serie A	11	1	0	0	7	2	18	3
Inter Milan (loan)	2014–15	Serie A	12	5	0	0	7	2	19	7
Boca Juniors (loan)	2015	Argentine Primera División	11	3	1	1	4	3	16	7
Porto	2015–16	Primeira Liga	7	1	2	0	3	0	12	1
Boca Juniors	2016	Argentine Primera División	3	0	2	0	1	0	6	0
Banfield	2020	Argentine Primera División	2	0	0	0	0	0	2	0
Career total			271	88	15	3	35	8	321	99

=== International ===
Appearances and goals by national team and year
National team	Year	Apps	Goals
Italy	2011	2	0
Italy	2012	4	3
Italy	2013	7	1
Italy	2014	1	0
Total		14	4

Scores and results list Italy's goal tally first, score column indicates score after each Osvaldo goal.

List of international goals scored by Dani Osvaldo
No.	Date	Venue	Opponent	Score	Result	Competition
1	7 September 2012	Vasil Levski National Stadium, Sofia, Bulgaria	Bulgaria	1–1	2–2	2014 FIFA World Cup qualification
2	7 September 2012	Vasil Levski National Stadium, Sofia, Bulgaria	Bulgaria	2–1	2–2	2014 FIFA World Cup qualification
3	12 October 2012	Hrazdan Stadium, Yerevan, Armenia	Armenia	3–1	3–1	2014 FIFA World Cup qualification
4	11 October 2013	Parken Stadium, Copenhagen, Denmark	Denmark	1–0	2–2	2014 FIFA World Cup qualification

== Honours ==
Atalanta

- Serie B: 2005–06

Roma

- Coppa Italia runner-up: 2012–13

Juventus

- Serie A: 2013–14

Boca Juniors

- Argentine Primera División: 2015
- Copa Argentina: 2014–15
- Supercopa Argentina runner-up: 2015

Italy U21

- Toulon Tournament: 2008

== See also ==
- List of athletes who came out of retirement
