= Julián Carranza =

Argentine footballer (born 2000)

Personal information
- Full name: Julián Simón Carranza
- Date of birth: 22 May 2000 (age 26)
- Place of birth: Oncativo, Argentina
- Height: 1.82 m (6 ft 0 in)
- Position: Forward

Team information
- Current team: Necaxa
- Number: 9

Youth career
- Banfield

Senior career*
Years	Team	Apps	(Gls)
2017–2019	Banfield	48	(11)
2019–2022	Inter Miami	41	(3)
2019	→ Banfield (loan)	11	(2)
2022	→ Philadelphia Union (loan)	16	(7)
2022–2024	Philadelphia Union	60	(28)
2024–2026	Feyenoord	30	(5)
2025–2026	→ Leicester City (loan)	9	(0)
2026–	Necaxa	16	(10)

International career
2017	Argentina U17	4	(3)
- * Club domestic league appearances and goals as of 03:22, 11 October 2026 (UTC)

Julián Simón Carranza (born 22 May 2000) is an Argentine professional footballer who plays as a forward for Liga MX club Necaxa.

== Club career ==
=== Banfield ===
Carranza's career began in 2017 with Argentine Primera División side Banfield. His first appearance for Banfield came against Defensa y Justicia in the league on 24 November, coming on as a 55th-minute substitute for Michael López. In his third appearance, Carranza scored two goals in a home defeat versus Argentinos Juniors on 9 December. He ended 2017–18 with five goals in fourteen league fixtures, subsequently netting a further five times in all competitions in 2018–19.

=== Inter Miami ===
On 26 July 2019, Major League Soccer's Inter Miami signed Carranza. However, he was loaned back to Banfield until January 2020; when Inter Miami would officially join MLS. He returned from his homeland in early 2020, but didn't play until midway through the year due to the COVID-19 pandemic; he first played on 8 July, in an MLS is Back Tournament loss to Orlando City. On 22 August he scored twice against the same opponents during the MLS regular season .

==== Loan back to Banfield ====
Carranza spent five months back with Banfield to end 2019 after his transfer to Inter Miami, due to the newly formed American club not joining Major League Soccer until the succeeding January. He made twelve appearances in his second spell, whilst netting goals against Godoy Cruz and Lanús. His last appearance came in a win away to Independiente on 6 December 2019.

=== Philadelphia Union ===
In December 2021, it was announced that Carranza would spend the 2022 season on loan with the Philadelphia Union, in exchange for a second-round selection in the 2022 SuperDraft.

On 2 April 2022, Carranza scored his first goal for the Philadelphia Union in a 2–0 home victory over Charlotte FC. On 12 July, he netted his first career hat-trick in a 7–0 home victory over D.C. United, becoming the fifth player in the Union's history to achieve the feat. He was voted MLS Player of the Week. On 13 July, Philadelphia opted to make Carranza's move to the club permanent, sending Miami $500,000 of General Allocation Money. On 21 August, he bagged a second-half hat-trick in a 6–0 away win over D.C. United, becoming the first Union player to score multiple hat-tricks, and joining Cobi Jones as the only players to have scored two hat-tricks against the same side in a single MLS season. Carranza also became the first Philadelphia player to score three goals and register an assist in the same match, and by being voted MLS Player of the Week again, he became only the second Union player after Sébastien Le Toux (2010) to win the award twice in the same season.

=== Feyenoord ===
On 30 June 2024, Dutch club Feyenoord announced that they had signed Carranza on a four-year contract. On 19 October, he netted his first goal for the club in a 5–1 away win over Go Ahead Eagles. On 18 February 2025, he scored his first UEFA Champions League goal in a 1–1 away draw against AC Milan in the second leg of the knockout play-offs, securing his team's 2–1 aggregate triumph to advance to the Round of 16. Hence, he became the third Argentinian player to score for Feyenoord in the European competition, following Julio Ricardo Cruz and Mariano Bombarda.

==== Leicester City (loan) ====
On 1 September 2025, Carranza joined EFL Championship club Leicester City on a season-long loan. However, his loan was cut short after making nine appearances, and he returned to his parent club on 2 January 2026.

== International career ==
Carranza featured in two matches for the Argentina U17 team at the 2017 South American Championship in Chile. He also featured in friendlies for the U17s, versus Godoy Cruz and Racing Club respectively; scoring twice against Godoy and once against Racing. Carranza has also trained with the U20 team. September 2019 saw Carranza make Fernando Batista's U23 squad.

== Career statistics ==
As of match played on 26 September 2025

Appearances and goals by club, season and competition
Club	Season	League			National cup (Note: Includes Copa Argentina, U.S. Open Cup, KNVB Cup)		League cup (Note: Includes Copa de la Liga Profesional)		Continental		Other		Total	
Club	Season	Division	Apps	Goals	Apps	Goals	Apps	Goals	Apps	Goals	Apps	Goals	Apps	Goals
Banfield	2017–18	Argentine Primera División	14	5	0	0	—		3 (Note: Appearances in Copa Libertadores)	0	0	0	17	5
Banfield	2018–19	Argentine Primera División	15	3	1	1	2	1	1 (Note: Appearance in Copa Sudamericana)	0	0	0	19	5
Banfield	Total		29	8	1	1	2	1	4	0	0	0	36	10
Inter Miami	2020	Major League Soccer	16	2	0	0	—		—		1 (Note: Appearance in MLS Cup Playoffs)	0	17	2
Inter Miami	2021	Major League Soccer	25	1	0	0	—		—		0	0	25	1
Inter Miami	Total		41	3	0	0	—		—		1	0	42	3
Banfield (loan)	2019–20	Argentine Primera División	11	2	1	0	0	0	—		—		12	2
Philadelphia Union (loan)	2022	Major League Soccer	16	7	1	0	—		—		—		17	7
Philadelphia Union	2022	Major League Soccer	18	8	—		—		—		—		18	8
Philadelphia Union	2023	Major League Soccer	30	14	1	0	—		6 (Note: Appearances in CONCACAF Champions League)	2	8 (Note: Five appearances and two goals in Leagues Cup, three appearances in MLS Cup Playoffs)	2	45	18
Philadelphia Union	2024	Major League Soccer	12	6	0	0	—		3	4	—		15	10
Philadelphia Union	Total		60	28	1	0	0	0	9	6	8	2	78	36
Feyenoord	2024–25	Eredivisie	21	4	2	0	—		7 (Note: Appearances in UEFA Champions League)	1	0	0	30	5
Leicester City (loan)	2025–26	EFL Championship	9	0	0	0	—		—		—		9	0
Career total			180	52	6	1	2	1	20	7	9	2	217	63

== Honours ==
Philadelphia Union

- MLS Cup runner-up: 2022
