= Enzo Trinidad =

Argentine footballer

Personal information
- Full name: Enzo Gabriel Trinidad
- Date of birth: 19 September 1996 (age 30)
- Place of birth: Máximo Paz, Argentina
- Height: 1.79 m (5 ft 10 1/2 in)
- Position: Midfielder

Team information
- Current team: Colegiales

Youth career
- Banfield

Senior career*
Years	Team	Apps	(Gls)
2014–2018	Banfield	21	(2)
2016–2017	→ Brown (loan)	13	(0)
2018–2019	Tristán Suárez	40	(6)
2019–2020	Atlanta	14	(0)
2021–2023	Flandria	47	(3)
2023–2024	Nacional	14	(2)
2024–2025	Nueva Chicago	11	(0)
2025–2026	Defensores Unidos	29	(0)
2026–	Colegiales	7	(0)
- * Club domestic league appearances and goals as of 17:24, 25 April 2026 (UTC)

Enzo Gabriel Trinidad (born 19 September 1996) is an Argentine professional footballer who plays as a midfielder for Primera Nacional side Colegiales.

== Career ==
Trinidad's senior career started with Banfield in 2014, and he made his professional debut on 31 March in a Primera B Nacional match with Patronato. That was his only appearance in the 2013–14 season, which Banfield ended as champions. He scored on his top-flight debut on 16 August in a defeat to Defensa y Justicia, prior to scoring again four games later versus Belgrano. Throughout the three seasons after his debut, Trinidad made twenty appearances for Banfield. In July 2016, Trinidad joined Brown of Primera B Nacional on loan. He returned to Banfield a year later after thirteen matches.

In 2018, Trinidad signed for Tristán Suárez in Primera B Metropolitana. In July 2019, he moved to Atlanta, where he played until the end of 2020. In February 2021, Trinidad joined CSD Flandria.

== Career statistics ==
As of 8 May 2018.

Club statistics
Club	Season	League			Cup (Note: Includes the Copa Argentina)		League Cup		Continental (Note: Includes the Copa Libertadores and Copa Sudamericana)		Other		Total	
Club	Season	Division	Apps	Goals	Apps	Goals	Apps	Goals	Apps	Goals	Apps	Goals	Apps	Goals
Banfield	2013–14	Primera B Nacional	1	0	1	0	—		—		0	0	2	0
Banfield	2014	Primera División	10	2	0	0	—		—		0	0	10	2
Banfield	2015	Primera División	5	0	1	0	—		—		0	0	6	0
Banfield	2016	Primera División	5	0	0	0	—		—		0	0	5	0
Banfield	2016–17	Primera División	0	0	0	0	—		0	0	0	0	0	0
Banfield	2017–18	Primera División	0	0	0	0	—		0	0	0	0	0	0
Banfield	Total		21	2	2	0	—		0	0	0	0	23	2
Brown (loan)	2016–17	Primera B Nacional	13	0	1	0	—		—		0	0	14	0
Tristán Suárez	2017–18	Primera B Metropolitana	13	2	0	0	—		—		1 (Note: One appearance in 2017–18 Primera B Metropolitana play-offs)	0	14	2
Career total			47	4	3	0	—		0	0	1	0	51	4

== Honours ==
Banfield

- Primera B Nacional: 2013–14
