= Alejandro Cabrera (footballer) =

Argentine professional footballer

Personal information
- Full name: Alejandro Cabrera
- Date of birth: 30 September 1992 (age 34)
- Place of birth: Los Cóndores, Argentina
- Height: 1.85 m (6 ft 1 in)
- Position: Midfielder

Team information
- Current team: Estudiantes RC (on loan from Banfield)
- Number: 5

Youth career
- Atlético Almafuerte
- Argentino Colonial
- 2004–2007: Talleres
- 2007: Deportivo Atalaya

Senior career*
Years	Team	Apps	(Gls)
2007–2011	Argentino Colonial		
2011–2016	Club Roncedo		
2016–2022	Estudiantes RC	88	(2)
2020–2021	→ Banfield (loan)	21	(1)
2022–	Banfield	50	(3)
2025–	→ Estudiantes RC (loan)	57	(2)
- * Club domestic league appearances and goals as of 17:41, 8 November 2026 (UTC)

Alejandro Cabrera (born 30 September 1992) is an Argentine professional footballer who plays as a midfielder for Estudiantes RC, on loan from Banfield.

== Career ==
Cabrera started out, aged four, with Atlético Almafuerte. A move to Argentino Colonial followed, before he spent three years with Talleres. After leaving them, he had a stint with Deportivo Atalaya. He started his senior career in Liga Riotercerense with Argentino Colonial, who he joined in 2007; having almost quit football. Four years later, Cabrera signed for Club Roncedo of Liga Rió primero. July 2016 saw Cabrera join Torneo Federal B side Estudiantes RC. They won promotion in his first season, as he appeared nineteen times. Fifty-three appearances followed in Torneo Federal A, which culminated with promotion in 2018–19.

Cabrera scored goals for Estudiantes against Independiente Rivadavia and Ferro Carril Oeste in the second tier in 2019–20. In August 2020, Cabrera moved up to the Primera División with Banfield; penning a loan contract until December 2021 with a purchase option. He made his top-flight debut at the Estadio Monumental Antonio Vespucio Liberti against River Plate on 3 November; replacing Giuliano Galoppo for the final sixteen minutes of a 3–1 victory.

On 26 December 2021 Banfield confirmed, that the club had triggered the purchase option and signed Cabrera on a permanently deal until the end of 2024.

== Career statistics ==
As of 1 November 2021.

Appearances and goals by club, season and competition
Club	Season	League			Cup		League Cup		Continental		Other		Total	
Club	Season	Division	Apps	Goals	Apps	Goals	Apps	Goals	Apps	Goals	Apps	Goals	Apps	Goals
Estudiantes	2016–17	Torneo Federal B	19	0	0	0	—		—		0	0	19	0
Estudiantes	2017–18	Torneo Federal A	29	0	2	0	—		—		0	0	31	0
Estudiantes	2018–19	Torneo Federal A	24	0	3	1	—		—		0	0	27	1
Estudiantes	2019–20	Primera B Nacional	16	2	0	0	—		—		0	0	16	2
Estudiantes	2020–21	Primera B Nacional	0	0	0	0	—		—		0	0	0	0
Estudiantes	Total		88	2	5	1	—		—		0	0	93	3
Banfield (loan)	2020–21 (Note: Soccerway counts Copa de la Liga Profesional appearances as league appearances.)	Primera División	14	0	2	0	7	1	—		0	0	23	1
Career total			102	2	7	1	7	1	—		0	0	116	4
