= 2020 Copa de la Liga Profesional =

Copa Diego Armando Maradona

Tournament details
- Country: Argentina
- Dates: 30 October 2020 – 31 March 2021
- Teams: 24

Final positions
- Champions: Boca Juniors (1st title)
- 2021 Copa Libertadores: San Lorenzo (via 2019–20 Superliga)
- 2022 Copa Sudamericana: Banfield

Tournament statistics
- Matches played: 135
- Goals scored: 356 (2.64 per match)
- Top goal scorer(s): Ramón Ábila; Miguel Merentiel; Luis Miguel Rodríguez (6 goals each)

The 2020 Copa de la Liga Profesional (officially Copa Diego Armando Maradona) was the first edition of the Copa de la Liga Profesional, an Argentine domestic cup contested by the 24 teams that took part in the Primera División during the 2019–20 season. The tournament was named after Diego Maradona. The competition started on 30 October 2020 and ended on 31 March 2021.

The competition was planned and organised by the "Liga Profesional de Fútbol", a body linked to the Argentine Football Association (AFA) that replaced the defunct Superliga Argentina. This cup was conceived as a contingency competition after the schedule for a regular league season had been repeatedly delayed because of the COVID-19 pandemic.

Boca Juniors and Banfield advanced to the Fase Campeón Final. Boca Juniors won the Final via a penalty shoot-out after the game had finished 1–1 and were crowned as champions of the cup. As Boca Juniors had already qualified for the 2021 Copa Libertadores, San Lorenzo (best team of the 2019–20 Superliga Argentina and 2020 Copa de la Superliga aggregate table not yet qualified) gained the 2021 Copa Libertadores berth.

== Format ==
Original logo of the cup, changed after the passing of Diego Maradona

For the group stage, the 24 teams were drawn into six groups of four teams each, playing on a double round-robin basis. In each zone, the top two teams advanced to the "Fase Campeón" while the bottom two teams advanced to the "Fase Complementación".

In the Fase Campeón, the 12 qualified teams were split into two groups of six teams each, where they played a single round-robin tournament. The winners of each group played the final match at a neutral venue. The winners of the Fase Campeón final were crowned champions of the cup and qualified for the 2021 Copa Libertadores.

On the other hand, teams in Fase Complementación played under the same format as in the Fase Campeón. The winners of the Fase Complementación final played a match against the Fase Campeón runners-up with the winners qualifying for the 2022 Copa Sudamericana.

== Draws ==
The draw for the group stage was held on 16 October 2020, 14:00, at Complejo Habitacional de Ezeiza in Ezeiza. The 24 teams were drawn into six groups of four containing one team from each of the four pots.

Group stage draw
Pot 1	Pot 2	Pot 3	Pot 4
Boca Juniors; Independiente; Racing; River Plate; San Lorenzo; Vélez Sarsfield	Argentinos Juniors; Arsenal; Banfield; Defensa y Justicia; Huracán; Lanús	Aldosivi; Atlético Tucumán; Central Córdoba (SdE); Godoy Cruz; Patronato; Talleres (C)	Colón; Estudiantes (LP); Gimnasia y Esgrima (LP); Newell's Old Boys; Rosario Central; Unión

The draws for the Fase Campeón and the Fase Complementación were held on 7 December 2020, 21:30, at Complejo Habitacional de Ezeiza in Ezeiza. For the Fase Campeón, the winners and runners-up of each zone were allocated to Pot 3 and Pot 4, respectively. Likewise, for the Fase Complementación, the third-placed teams and fourth-placed teams of each zone were allocated to Pot 1 and Pot 2, respectively.

For each stage, the 12 qualified teams were drawn into two groups of six containing three teams from each of the two pots. Teams from the same zone could not be drawn into the same group.

Fase Campeón draw
Pot 3	Pot 4
Atlético Tucumán (Zone 1); Colón (Zone 2); River Plate (Zone 3); Boca Juniors (Zone 4); San Lorenzo (Zone 5); Huracán (Zone 6)	Arsenal (Zone 1); Independiente (Zone 2); Banfield (Zone 3); Talleres (C) (Zone 4); Argentinos Juniors (Zone 5); Gimnasia y Esgrima (LP) (Zone 6)

Fase Complementación draw
Pot 1	Pot 2
Unión (Zone 1); Central Córdoba (SdE) (Zone 2); Rosario Central (Zone 3); Newell's Old Boys (Zone 4); Aldosivi (Zone 5); Vélez Sarsfield (Zone 6)	Racing (Zone 1); Defensa y Justicia (Zone 2); Godoy Cruz (Zone 3); Lanús (Zone 4); Estudiantes (LP) (Zone 5); Patronato (Zone 6)

== Group stage ==
In the group stage ("Fase Clasificación"), each group was played on a home-and-away round-robin basis. Teams were ranked according to the following criteria: 1. Points (3 points for a win, 1 point for a draw, and 0 points for a loss); 2. Goal difference; 3. Goals scored; 4. Head-to-head points; 5. Head-to-head goal difference; 6. Head-to-head goals scored (Regulations Article 2.1).

The winners and runners-up of each group advanced to the "Fase Campeón" while the bottom two teams advanced to the "Fase Complementación".

=== Zone 1 ===
Pos	Team	Pld	W	D	L	GF	GA	GD	Pts	Qualification	ATU	ARS	UNI	RAC
1	Atlético Tucumán	6	6	0	0	19	8	+11	18	Advance to Fase Campeón		3–2	3–1	2–0
2	Arsenal	6	2	1	3	8	8	0	7	Advance to Fase Campeón	1–2		2–3	1–0
3	Unión	6	2	1	3	9	11	−2	7	Advance to Fase Complementación	3–5	0–0		2–0
4	Racing	6	1	0	5	2	11	−9	3	Advance to Fase Complementación	1–4	0–2	1–0	

Source: AFA

=== Zone 2 ===
Pos	Team	Pld	W	D	L	GF	GA	GD	Pts	Qualification	COL	IND	CCO	DYJ
1	Colón	6	4	1	1	11	3	+8	13	Advance to Fase Campeón		1–2	2–0	2–0
2	Independiente	6	3	3	0	5	2	+3	12	Advance to Fase Campeón	1–1		0–0	1–0
3	Central Córdoba (SdE)	6	1	2	3	5	9	−4	5	Advance to Fase Complementación	0–2	0–1		2–2
4	Defensa y Justicia	6	0	2	4	4	11	−7	2	Advance to Fase Complementación	0–3	0–0	2–3	

Source: AFA

=== Zone 3 ===
Pos	Team	Pld	W	D	L	GF	GA	GD	Pts	Qualification	RIV	BAN	ROS	GOD
1	River Plate	6	5	0	1	11	5	+6	15	Advance to Fase Campeón		1–3	2–1	3–1
2	Banfield	6	3	2	1	9	6	+3	11	Advance to Fase Campeón	0–2		1–1	1–0
3	Rosario Central	6	2	1	3	7	10	−3	7	Advance to Fase Complementación	0–2	2–4		2–1
4	Godoy Cruz	6	0	1	5	2	8	−6	1	Advance to Fase Complementación	0–1	0–0	0–1	

Source: AFA

=== Zone 4 ===
Pos	Team	Pld	W	D	L	GF	GA	GD	Pts	Qualification	BOC	TAL	NOB	LAN
1	Boca Juniors	6	3	1	2	7	4	+3	10	Advance to Fase Campeón		0–1	2–0	1–2
2	Talleres (C)	6	2	3	1	6	4	+2	9	Advance to Fase Campeón	0–0		3–1	1–1
3	Newell's Old Boys	6	2	1	3	9	11	−2	7	Advance to Fase Complementación	0–2	1–1		3–1
4	Lanús	6	2	1	3	8	11	−3	7	Advance to Fase Complementación	1–2	1–0	2–4	

Source: AFA

=== Zone 5 ===
Pos	Team	Pld	W	D	L	GF	GA	GD	Pts	Qualification	SLO	ARG	ALD	EST
1	San Lorenzo	6	3	3	0	8	1	+7	12	Advance to Fase Campeón		2–0	0–0	2–0
2	Argentinos Juniors	6	3	1	2	6	4	+2	10	Advance to Fase Campeón	0–0		0–1	1–0
3	Aldosivi	6	2	2	2	4	8	−4	8	Advance to Fase Complementación	1–4	1–4		0–0
4	Estudiantes (LP)	6	0	2	4	0	5	−5	2	Advance to Fase Complementación	0–0	0–1	0–1	

Source: AFA

=== Zone 6 ===
Pos	Team	Pld	W	D	L	GF	GA	GD	Pts	Qualification	HUR	GLP	VEL	PAT
1	Huracán	6	3	2	1	8	6	+2	11	Advance to Fase Campeón		3–2	1–2	1–0
2	Gimnasia y Esgrima (LP)	6	2	3	1	8	5	+3	9	Advance to Fase Campeón	0–0		2–2	3–0
3	Vélez Sarsfield	6	2	3	1	6	5	+1	9	Advance to Fase Complementación	1–1	0–1		1–0
4	Patronato	6	0	2	4	1	7	−6	2	Advance to Fase Complementación	1–2	0–0	0–0	

Source: AFA

== Fase Campeón ==
In the Fase Campeón, each group comprised three winners and three runners-up from the group stage. The groups were played on a single round-robin basis, with the group stage winners playing three home matches. Teams were ranked according to the following criteria: 1. Points (3 points for a win, 1 point for a draw, and 0 points for a loss); 2. Goal difference; 3. Goals scored; 4. Head-to-head points; 5. Head-to-head goal difference; 6. Head-to-head goals scored (Regulations Article 2.2).

The Fase Campeón final match was played between the winners of each group at a neutral venue. If tied, a penalty shoot-out would be used to determine the champions (Regulations Article 2.2). The champions qualified for the 2021 Copa Libertadores.

=== Group A ===
Pos	Team	Pld	W	D	L	GF	GA	GD	Pts	Qualification	BOC	RIV	ARG	ARS	IND	HUR
1	Boca Juniors	5	2	3	0	10	6	+4	9	Advance to Fase Campeón Final		2–2		1–1		3–0
2	River Plate	5	2	2	1	8	7	+1	8				1–1	2–1	0–2	
3	Argentinos Juniors	5	2	2	1	5	5	0	8		2–2				0–2	
4	Arsenal	5	2	1	2	7	7	0	7				0–1			1–0
5	Independiente	5	2	0	3	10	9	+1	6		1–2			3–4		
6	Huracán	5	1	0	4	4	10	−6	3			1–3	0–1		3–2	

Source: AFA

=== Group B ===
Pos	Team	Pld	W	D	L	GF	GA	GD	Pts	Qualification	BAN	TAL	GLP	COL	SLO	ATU
1	Banfield	5	4	0	1	12	6	+6	12	Advance to Fase Campeón Final			2–1		4–1	
2	Talleres (C)	5	3	2	0	10	6	+4	11		3–2					1–1
3	Gimnasia y Esgrima (LP)	5	2	1	2	7	6	+1	7			2–2				0–1
4	Colón	5	1	1	3	6	8	−2	4		1–2	1–2	0–2			
5	San Lorenzo	5	1	1	3	7	11	−4	4			0–2	1–2	2–2		
6	Atlético Tucumán	5	1	1	3	3	8	−5	4		0–2			0–2	1–3	

Source: AFA

=== Final ===
17 January 2021
22:10

Boca Juniors	1–1	Banfield
Cardona 63'	Report	Lollo 90+5'
Penalties
Tevez (penalty scored); Villa (penalty scored); Salvio (penalty scored); Izquierdoz (penalty scored); Buffarini (penalty scored)	5–3	(penalty scored) Lollo; (penalty scored) Fontana; (penalty missed) Rodríguez; (penalty scored) Álvarez

Estadio San Juan del Bicentenario, San Juan
Attendance: 0
Referee: Facundo Tello

== Fase Complementación ==
In the Fase Complementación, each group comprised three third-placed teams and three fourth-placed teams from the group stage. The groups were played on a single round-robin basis, with the third-placed teams playing three home matches. Teams were ranked according to the following criteria: 1. Points (3 points for a win, 1 point for a draw, and 0 points for a loss); 2. Goal difference; 3. Goals scored; 4. Head-to-head points; 5. Head-to-head goal difference; 6. Head-to-head goals scored (Regulations Article 2.3).

The Fase Complementación final match was played between the winners of each group at a neutral venue. If tied, a penalty shoot-out would be used to determine the winners (Regulations Articles 2.3).

=== Group A ===
Pos	Team	Pld	W	D	L	GF	GA	GD	Pts	Qualification	ROS	LAN	DYJ	UNI	ALD	PAT
1	Rosario Central	5	3	1	1	10	4	+6	10	Advance to Fase Complementación Final			3–0	2–2		4–0
2	Lanús	5	2	2	1	6	5	+1	8		2–0		1–1			
3	Defensa y Justicia	5	2	2	1	10	10	0	8						4–4	2–1
4	Unión	5	2	1	2	9	8	+1	7			2–0	1–3			1–2
5	Aldosivi	5	1	1	3	7	10	−3	4		0–1	1–2		1–3		
6	Patronato	5	1	1	3	4	9	−5	4			1–1			0–1	

Source: AFA

=== Group B ===
Pos	Team	Pld	W	D	L	GF	GA	GD	Pts	Qualification	VEL	NOB	RAC	CCO	EST	GOD
1	Vélez Sarsfield	5	4	0	1	10	6	+4	12	Advance to Fase Complementación Final			2–1		2–3	3–2
2	Newell's Old Boys	5	3	0	2	8	5	+3	9		0–1			3–1	1–0	
3	Racing	5	2	2	1	13	7	+6	8			3–1				6–1
4	Central Córdoba (SdE)	5	1	2	2	6	9	−3	5		0–2		2–2			1–1
5	Estudiantes (LP)	5	1	1	3	5	7	−2	4				1–1	1–2		
6	Godoy Cruz	5	1	1	3	5	13	−8	4			0–3			1–0	

Source: AFA

=== Final ===
16 January 2021
22:10

Vélez Sarsfield	3–1	Rosario Central
Centurión 8' (pen.); Almada 79' (pen.); Monzón 90+1'	Report	Marinelli 25'

Estadio San Juan del Bicentenario, San Juan
Attendance: 0
Referee: Patricio Loustau

== 2022 Copa Sudamericana qualifying play-off ==
The Fase Complementación winners, Vélez Sarsfield, played a match against the Fase Campeón runners-up, Banfield, at a neutral venue, with the winners qualifying for the 2022 Copa Sudamericana. If tied, a penalty shoot-out would be used to determine the winners (Regulations Article 4.7).

31 March 2021
20:15

Vélez Sarsfield	2–3	Banfield
Janson 26'; Orellano 51'	Report	Pons 13', 21'; Cabrera 72'

Estadio San Juan del Bicentenario, San Juan
Attendance: 0
Referee: Fernando Rapallini

== Statistics ==
=== Top goalscorers ===
Rank	Player	Club	Goals
1	(Argentina) Ramón Ábila	Boca Juniors	6
1	(Argentina) Luis Miguel Rodríguez	Colón	6
1	(Uruguay) Miguel Merentiel	Defensa y Justicia	6
4	(Argentina) Agustín Fontana	Banfield	5
4	(Argentina) Giuliano Galoppo	Banfield	5
4	(Argentina) Alan Velasco	Independiente	5
4	(Argentina) Sebastián Palacios	Newell's Old Boys	5
4	(Argentina) Alan Marinelli	Rosario Central	5
4	(Argentina) Emiliano Vecchio	Rosario Central	5
10	(Uruguay) Jhonatan Candia	Arsenal	4
10	(Colombia) Edwin Cardona	Boca Juniors	4
10	(Argentina) Andrés Chávez	Huracán	4
10	(Paraguay) Lorenzo Melgarejo	Racing	4
10	(Paraguay) Ángel Romero	San Lorenzo	4
10	(Colombia) Diego Valoyes	Talleres (C)	4
10	(Argentina) Juan Manuel García	Unión	4
10	(Argentina) Cristian Tarragona	Vélez Sarsfield	4

Source: AFA
