= Denis Brizuela =

Argentine footballer (born 1997)

Personal information
- Full name: Denis Agustín Brizuela
- Date of birth: 12 May 1997 (age 29)
- Place of birth: González Catán, Argentina
- Height: 1.69 m (5 ft 6 1/2 in)
- Position: Attacking midfielder

Team information
- Current team: Deportivo Merlo

Senior career*
Years	Team	Apps	(Gls)
2015–2017	Deportivo Merlo	22	(0)
2017–2019	Banfield	0	(0)
2019–2020	Villa Dálmine	8	(0)
2021	Jezero	15	(1)
2022–	Deportivo Merlo	23	(0)
- * Club domestic league appearances and goals as of 17:28, 4 September 2022 (UTC)

Denis Agustín Brizuela (born 12 May 1997) is an Argentine professional footballer who plays as an attacking midfielder for Deportivo Merlo.

== Career ==
Brizuela's first career club was Deportivo Merlo, who he began featuring for at senior level during the 2015 Primera B Metropolitana campaign; he was selected in two fixtures, notably for his debut on 23 September versus Estudiantes. The club were relegated in 2015, with Brizuela subsequently playing twenty times across the following two campaigns in Primera C Metropolitana. In July 2017, Brizuela left Deportivo Merlo and joined Primera División side Banfield. Two years later, having only featured for their reserves, Brizuela departed and then signed with Villa Dálmine in Primera B Nacional. He appeared in eight matches across 2019–20.

Brizuela left Villa Dálmine in late 2020. On 1 February 2021, Brizuela completed a move abroad to Montenegro with First League outfit Jezero. He debuted in a home defeat to Zeta on 19 February, as he came off the bench to replace Vojin Pavlović with ten minutes left. Brizuela left Montenegro at the end of the 2021–22 season. In January 2022, he returned to his homeland and signed with his former club Deportivo Merlo.

== Career statistics ==
As of 6 March 2021.

Club statistics
Club	Season	League			Cup		League Cup		Continental		Other		Total	
Club	Season	Division	Apps	Goals	Apps	Goals	Apps	Goals	Apps	Goals	Apps	Goals	Apps	Goals
Deportivo Merlo	2015	Primera B Metropolitana	2	0	0	0	—		—		0	0	2	0
Banfield	2017–18	Primera División	0	0	0	0	—		0	0	0	0	0	0
Banfield	2018–19	Primera División	0	0	0	0	0	0	—		0	0	0	0
Banfield	Total		0	0	0	0	0	0	0	0	0	0	0	0
Villa Dálmine	2019–20	Primera B Nacional	8	0	0	0	—		—		0	0	8	0
Villa Dálmine	2020	Primera B Nacional	0	0	0	0	—		—		0	0	0	0
Villa Dálmine	Total		8	0	0	0	0	0	0	0	0	0	8	0
Jezero	2020–21	First League	15	1	0	0	—		0	0	0	0	15	1
Career total			25	1	0	0	0	0	0	0	0	0	25	1
