= Matías Moya =

Argentine-Chilean footballer

Personal information
- Full name: Matías Hernán Moya
- Date of birth: 26 March 1998 (age 28)
- Place of birth: Neuquén, Argentina
- Height: 1.67 m (5 ft 5 1/2 in)
- Position: Forward

Team information
- Current team: 2 de Mayo

Youth career
- 2010–2016: River Plate

Senior career*
Years	Team	Apps	(Gls)
2016–2021	River Plate	4	(1)
2019–2020	→ Banfield (loan)	9	(0)
2021	→ Ñublense (loan)	22	(6)
2022	Ñublense	4	(0)
2023–2025	Colo-Colo	15	(1)
2025	→ Deportes Iquique (loan)	16	(0)
2026–	2 de Mayo	0	(0)
- * Club domestic league appearances and goals as of 10 December 2025

Matías Hernán Moya (born 26 March 1998) is an Argentine-Chilean professional footballer who plays as a forward for Paraguayan club 2 de Mayo.

== Club career ==
Moya joined River Plate in 2010, he was promoted into the club's first-team squad in 2016. His professional debut arrived on 4 December against Independiente, playing sixty-five minutes of a 1–0 defeat. He scored his first career goal on 2 December 2018 against Gimnasia y Esgrima. January 2019 saw Moya leave on loan to Banfield. He remained for two seasons, making ten appearances in all competitions - though he started just twice. Upon returning to River in 2020, Moya was offered a contract extension through to 2022.

On 2021 season, Moya was loaned to Chilean Primera División side Ñublense. He continued at Ñublense for the 2022 season.

As a player of Colo-Colo, Moya was loaned out to Deportes Iquique for the 2025 season.

A free agent during the first half of 2026, Moya moved to Paraguay and signed with 2 de Mayo in July 2026.

== International career ==
Moya is eligible to play for Argentina or Chile internationally, the latter due to him having Chilean heritage through his grandparents. He rejected the chance to play for Chile at U20 level in February 2017.

== Personal life ==
In September 2022, Moya acquired the Chilean nationality by descent.

== Career statistics ==
As of 21 October 2020.

Club statistics
Club	Season	League			Cup		League Cup		Continental		Other		Total	
Club	Season	Division	Apps	Goals	Apps	Goals	Apps	Goals	Apps	Goals	Apps	Goals	Apps	Goals
River Plate	2016–17	Primera División	1	0	0	0	—		0	0	0	0	1	0
River Plate	2017–18	Primera División	2	0	0	0	—		0	0	0	0	2	0
River Plate	2018–19	Primera División	1	1	0	0	0	0	0	0	0	0	1	1
River Plate	2019–20	Primera División	0	0	0	0	0	0	0	0	0	0	0	0
River Plate	Total		4	1	0	0	0	0	0	0	0	0	4	1
Banfield (loan)	2018–19	Primera División	4	0	1	0	0	0	—		0	0	5	0
Banfield (loan)	2019–20	Primera División	5	0	0	0	0	0	—		0	0	5	0
Banfield (loan)	Total		9	0	0	0	0	0	0	0	0	0	10	0
Career total			13	1	1	0	0	0	0	0	0	0	14	1
