= Sebastián Benega =

Argentine footballer

Personal information
- Full name: Sebastián Martín Benega
- Date of birth: 20 May 1999 (age 27)
- Place of birth: Lomas de Zamora, Argentina
- Height: 1.76 m (5 ft 9 1/2 in)
- Positions: Midfielder; left-back

Team information
- Current team: Güemes (on loan from Banfield)

Youth career
- Banfield

Senior career*
Years	Team	Apps	(Gls)
2018–	Banfield	1	(0)
2021	→ Guillermo Brown (loan)	25	(1)
2022–	→ Güemes (loan)	3	(0)
- * Club domestic league appearances and goals as of 21:49, 20 March 2022 (UTC)

Sebastián Martín Benega (born 20 May 1999) is an Argentine professional footballer who plays as a midfielder or left-back for Güemes on loan from Banfield.

== Career ==
Benega began his career with Banfield. Julio César Falcioni moved him into their senior squad for the 2018–19 season, selecting him for the first time on 18 July 2018 during a Copa Argentina defeat to Primera C Metropolitana's General Lamadrid. Less than a month later, on 12 August, Benega made his professional league debut against Rosario Central in the Argentine Primera División.

== Career statistics ==
As of 10 October 2018.

Club statistics
Club	Season	League			Cup (Note: Includes the Copa Argentina)		League Cup		Continental		Other		Total	
Club	Season	Division	Apps	Goals	Apps	Goals	Apps	Goals	Apps	Goals	Apps	Goals	Apps	Goals
Banfield	2018–19	Primera División	1	0	1	0	—		—		0	0	2	0
Career total			1	0	1	0	—		—		0	0	2	0
