= Nicolás Linares =

Argentine footballer

Personal information
- Full name: Nicolás Linares
- Date of birth: 6 March 1996 (age 30)
- Place of birth: Monte Grande, Argentina
- Height: 1.75 m (5 ft 9 in)
- Position: Midfielder

Team information
- Current team: Aldosivi
- Number: 5

Youth career
- Estrella del Sur
- Banfield

Senior career*
| Years | Team | Apps | (Gls) |
| 2017–2024 | Banfield | 40 | (0) |
| 2022 | → Central Córdoba SdE (loan) | 26 | (1) |
| 2023 | → Instituto (loan) | 34 | (1) |
| 2024–2025 | Palestino | 27 | (1) |
| 2025–2026 | Amazonas | 7 | (0) |
| 2026 | Gimnasia Mendoza | 8 | (0) |
| 2026– | Aldosivi | 4 | (0) |
- * Club domestic league appearances and goals as of 17:41, 6 November 2026 (UTC)

Nicolás Hugo Linares (born 6 March 1996) is an Argentine professional footballer who plays as a midfielder for Aldosivi.

== Career ==
Linares began his career with Estrella del Sur, prior to joining Banfield's system. He was promoted into their senior squad for the 2017–18 Argentine Primera División campaign, making his professional debut at the Estadio Florencio Sola against Belgrano on 25 August 2017. Linares was selected nineteen more times during 2017–18, which included a Copa Libertadores bow in an encounter with Independiente del Valle in January 2018.

On 8 February 2022, Linares joined Central Córdoba SdE on loan until the end of 2022.

On 14 February 2024, he joined Chilean Primera División side Palestino from Banfield.

== Career statistics ==
As of 1 October 2018.

Club statistics
| Club | Season | League | | | Cup (Note: Includes the Copa Argentina) | | League Cup | | Continental (Note: Includes the Copa Libertadores and Copa Sudamericana) | | Other | | Total | |
| Club | Season | Division | Apps | Goals | Apps | Goals | Apps | Goals | Apps | Goals | Apps | Goals | Apps | Goals |
|---|---|---|---|---|---|---|---|---|---|---|---|---|---|---|
| Banfield | 2017–18 | Primera División | 18 | 0 | 1 | 0 | — | | 1 (Note: One appearance in the 2018 Copa Libertadores) | 0 | 0 | 0 | 20 | 0 |
| Banfield | 2018–19 | Primera División | 6 | 0 | 1 | 0 | — | | 3 (Note: Three appearances in the 2018 Copa Sudamericana) | 0 | 0 | 0 | 10 | 0 |
| Career total | | | 24 | 0 | 2 | 0 | — | | 4 | 0 | 0 | 0 | 30 | 0 |
