= Emanuel Coronel =

Argentine footballer

Personal information
- Full name: Emanuel Coronel
- Date of birth: 1 February 1997 (age 29)
- Place of birth: Concepción, Argentina
- Height: 1.73 m (5 ft 8 in)
- Position: Right-back

Team information
- Current team: Rosario Central
- Number: 32

Youth career
- Banfield

Senior career*
Years	Team	Apps	(Gls)
2018–2024	Banfield	119	(1)
2019	→ Brown de Adrogué (loan)	6	(0)
2024–	Rosario Central	72	(0)
- * Club domestic league appearances and goals as of 17:14, 10 July 2026 (UTC)

Emanuel Coronel (born 1 February 1997) is an Argentine professional footballer who plays as a right-back for Rosario Central.

== Career ==
Coronel was promoted into Banfield's first-team during 2017–18. He made his professional debut for the Argentine Primera División club on 3 February 2018, featuring for the full duration of a goalless draw at home to Atlético Tucumán. Coronel made one further appearance in his opening campaign versus Talleres, whilst also being an unused substitute on four occasions.

== Career statistics ==
As of 1 October 2018.

Club statistics
Club	Season	League			Cup (Note: Includes the Copa Argentina)		League Cup		Continental (Note: Includes the Copa Libertadores and Copa Sudamericana)		Other		Total	
Club	Season	Division	Apps	Goals	Apps	Goals	Apps	Goals	Apps	Goals	Apps	Goals	Apps	Goals
Banfield	2017–18	Primera División	2	0	0	0	—		0	0	0	0	2	0
Banfield	2018–19	Primera División	0	0	0	0	—		0	0	0	0	0	0
Career total			2	0	0	0	—		0	0	0	0	2	0

== Honours ==
Rosario Central

- Primera División: 2025 Liga
- Supercopa Internacional: 2026
