= Alexis Maldonado =

Argentine footballer

Personal information
- Full name: Luis Alexis Maldonado
- Date of birth: 2 September 1997 (age 29)
- Place of birth: La Rioja, Argentina
- Height: 1.88 m (6 ft 2 in)
- Position: Centre-back

Team information
- Current team: Belgrano
- Number: 2

Youth career
- Banfield

Senior career*
Years	Team	Apps	(Gls)
2016–2025	Banfield	107	(2)
2025–	Belgrano	24	(0)
- * Club domestic league appearances and goals as of 17:40, 9 July 2026 (UTC)

Luis Alexis Maldonado (born 2 September 1997) is an Argentine professional footballer who plays as a centre-back for Belgrano.

== Career ==
Maldonado's career got underway with Banfield. His first involvement with the club's senior team came in April 2016 against Patronato, when he was an unused substitute in a 0–2 victory. Maldonado made his professional debut on 14 October 2017 during an Argentine Primera División fixture with Estudiantes. A further six appearances followed for Maldonado during 2017–18.

== Career statistics ==
As of 1 October 2018.

Club statistics
Club	Season	League			Cup (Note: Includes the Copa Argentina)		League Cup		Continental (Note: Includes the Copa Libertadores and Copa Sudamericana)		Other		Total	
Club	Season	Division	Apps	Goals	Apps	Goals	Apps	Goals	Apps	Goals	Apps	Goals	Apps	Goals
Banfield	2016	Primera División	0	0	0	0	—		—		0	0	0	0
Banfield	2016–17	Primera División	0	0	0	0	—		0	0	0	0	0	0
Banfield	2017–18	Primera División	7	0	0	0	—		0	0	0	0	7	0
Banfield	2018–19	Primera División	1	0	0	0	—		2 (Note: Two appearances in the 2018 Copa Sudamericana)	0	0	0	3	0
Career total			8	0	0	0	—		2	0	0	0	10	0

== Honours ==
Belgrano

- Primera División: 2026 Apertura
