= Agustín Fontana =

Argentine footballer

Personal information
- Full name: Cristian Agustín Fontana
- Date of birth: 11 June 1996 (age 30)
- Place of birth: Lomas de Zamora, Argentina
- Height: 1.76 m (5 ft 9 1/2 in)
- Position: Centre-forward

Team information
- Current team: Unión San Felipe

Youth career
- Banfield

Senior career*
Years	Team	Apps	(Gls)
2014–2021	Banfield	40	(9)
2021–2023	River Plate	12	(0)
2022	→ Defensa y Justicia (loan)	24	(1)
2023–2024	Sarmiento Junín	22	(2)
2024	Águilas Doradas	6	(0)
2025	Estudiantes RC	20	(3)
2026–	Unión San Felipe	0	(0)
- * Club domestic league appearances and goals as of 9 March 2026

Cristian Agustín Fontana (born 11 June 1996) is an Argentine professional footballer who plays as a centre-forward for Chilean club Unión San Felipe.

== Career ==
=== Banfield ===
Fontana started his career in the youth system of Banfield. He made his debut for the Primera División team on 25 October 2014 in a defeat away to Vélez Sarsfield, after replacing Santiago Salcedo with twenty-two minutes remaining. He made two further appearances off the bench in the subsequent 2015 and 2016 campaigns before earning his first start on 10 September 2016 versus Colón. Fontana netted a brace during a 4–4 away draw against Tigre on 8 February 2019 and scored again just over a week later at home against River Plate. He scored once in 2019–20 season prior to netting five times at the 2020 Copa de la Liga Profesional.

On 8 February 2021, Fontana was sent to train with the reserves until his contract expiry date of 30 June 2021 due to contractual disagreements with Banfield. The club claimed that he and his agent, Rubén Contini, had gone back on their agreement to sign a contract extension for many months. Fontana responded by stating that he had never officially agreed to extend his contract and that it was Banfield who ended negotiations.

=== River Plate ===
On 18 February 2021, having been out in the cold with Banfield, Fontana completed a transfer to River Plate for a fee of $1,500,000.

To gain some experience, after only playing 440 minutes in 15 games for River plate, Fontana was loaned out to Defensa y Justicia in January 2022 for the rest of the year.

=== Unión San Felipe ===
In March 2026, Fontana moved to Chile and joined Unión San Felipe in the Primera B.

== Career statistics ==
As of 18 February 2021.

Club statistics
Club	Season	League			Cup		League Cup		Continental		Other		Total	
Club	Season	Division	Apps	Goals	Apps	Goals	Apps	Goals	Apps	Goals	Apps	Goals	Apps	Goals
Banfield	2014	Primera División	1	0	0	0	—		—		0	0	1	0
Banfield	2015	Primera División	1	0	0	0	—		—		0	0	1	0
Banfield	2016	Primera División	1	0	0	0	—		—		0	0	1	0
Banfield	2016–17	Primera División	5	0	1	0	—		0	0	0	0	6	0
Banfield	2017–18	Primera División	3	0	0	0	—		0	0	0	0	3	0
Banfield	2018–19	Primera División	6	3	0	0	0	0	1 (Note: Appearance(s) in the Copa Sudamericana)	0	0	0	7	3
Banfield	2019–20	Primera División	11	1	0	0	0	0	—		0	0	11	1
Banfield	2020–21	Primera División	12	5	0	0	0	0	—		0	0	12	5
Banfield	Total		40	9	1	0	0	0	1	0	0	0	42	9
River Plate	2021	Primera División	0	0	0	0	—		0	0	0	0	0	0
Career total			40	9	1	0	0	0	1	0	0	0	42	9
