= Giuliano Galoppo =

Argentine footballer

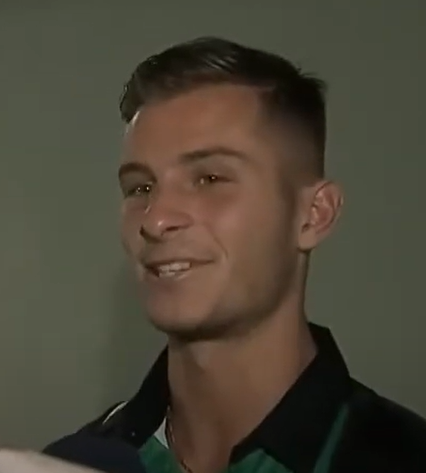
- Galoppo in 2022

Personal information
- Date of birth: 18 June 1999 (age 27)
- Place of birth: Buenos Aires, Argentina
- Height: 1.70 m (5 ft 7 in)
- Position: Midfielder

Team information
- Current team: Atlanta United (on loan from River Plate)
- Number: 11

Youth career
- Atlético Rafaela
- 2014–2015: Boca Juniors
- 2016–2018: Banfield

Senior career*
| Years | Team | Apps | (Gls) |
| 2018–2022 | Banfield | 73 | (20) |
| 2022–2025 | São Paulo | 45 | (10) |
| 2025 | → River Plate (loan) | 23 | (5) |
| 2026– | River Plate | 10 | (1) |
| 2026– | → Atlanta United (loan) | 9 | (2) |
- * Club domestic league appearances and goals as of 13:20, 15 November 2026 (UTC)

Giuliano Galoppo (born 18 June 1999) is an Argentine professional footballer who plays as a midfielder for Major League Soccer club Atlanta United, on loan from Argentine Primera División club River Plate.

== Club career ==
=== Banfield ===
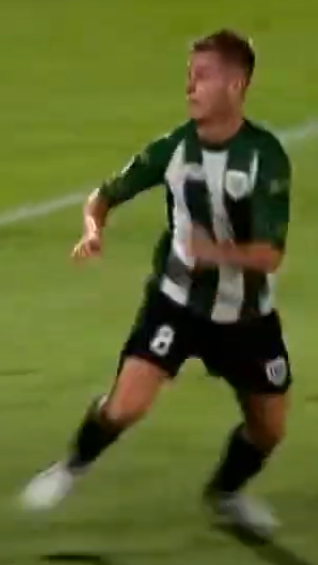
Galoppo playing for Banfield in 2022

Galoppo joined Boca Juniors' youth ranks in 2014, after playing for Atlético de Rafaela. He had previously trained with clubs in Italy due to his father playing in the country. In 2016, Galoppo joined Banfield.

Galoppo was promoted to the club's first-team during the 2017–18 Primera División season, subsequently being an unused substitute on six occasions across Primera División, Copa Argentina and Copa Sudamericana matches before making his bow. In November 2018, he made his professional debut during a Primera División draw away to Racing Club; Julio César Falcioni substituted him on after seventy-eight minutes for Luciano Gómez.

Galoppo's first start came in the succeeding March against Defensa y Justicia, which preceded him featuring four times off the bench in 2019–20. He scored his first league goal against River Plate on 4 November 2020, scoring in the 37th minute.

Galoppo then scored five goals in twelve appearances, one in each of the club's five away games, in the 2020 Copa de la Liga Profesional as they reached the final; where they'd lose out to his ex-club Boca Juniors. During the subsequent 2021 edition, the midfielder scored on matchday one at home to Racing Club before netting a brace on matchday two away against Arsenal de Sarandí.

=== São Paulo ===
On 26 July 2022, Galoppo joined Campeonato Brasileiro Série A club São Paulo, signing a contract until June 2027. He made his league debut against Athletico Paranaense on 31 July, and scored his first league goal against Goiás on 13 November.

Galoppo started the 2023 season by scoring in a regular basis, before suffering a knee injury in March of that year; despite his injury, he finished the 2023 Campeonato Paulista as a top scorer alongside Róger Guedes. He spent eight months sidelined, missing the remainder of the year.

Galoppo also struggled with injuries during the 2024 campaign, also having limited playing time under head coach Luis Zubeldía.

==== Loan to River Plate ====
On 3 January 2025, Galoppo joined River Plate on loan until the end of the year.

==== Loan to Atlanta United ====
On 2 September 2026, Galoppo joined Atlanta United on loan until the end of the 2027 sprint season. Atlanta holds an option for a permanent transfer.

== International career ==
In February 2018, Galoppo was selected to train with the Argentina U19s.

== Personal life ==
Galoppo is the son of former professional footballer Marcelino Galoppo.

== Career statistics ==
As of 18 December 2024.

Appearances and goals by club, season and competition
| Club | Season | League | | | National cup (Note: Includes Copa Argentina, Copa do Brasil) | | League cup (Note: Includes Copa de la Superliga) | | Continental | | State league | | Other | | Total | |
| Club | Season | Division | Apps | Goals | Apps | Goals | Apps | Goals | Apps | Goals | Apps | Goals | Apps | Goals | Apps | Goals |
|---|---|---|---|---|---|---|---|---|---|---|---|---|---|---|---|---|
| Banfield | 2017–18 | Primera División | 0 | 0 | 0 | 0 | — | | — | | — | | — | | 0 | 0 |
| Banfield | 2018–19 | Primera División | 2 | 0 | 0 | 0 | 2 | 0 | 0 | 0 | — | | — | | 4 | 0 |
| Banfield | 2019–20 | Primera División | 4 | 0 | 3 | 1 | 0 | 0 | — | | — | | — | | 7 | 1 |
| Banfield | 2020–21 | Primera División | 13 | 5 | 0 | 0 | 0 | 0 | — | | — | | — | | 13 | 5 |
| Banfield | 2021 | Primera División | 34 | 7 | 0 | 0 | — | | — | | — | | — | | 32 | 7 |
| Banfield | 2022 | Primera División | 20 | 8 | 1 | 0 | — | | 6 (Note: Appearances in Copa Sudamericana) | 0 | — | | — | | 27 | 8 |
| Banfield | Total | | 73 | 20 | 4 | 1 | 2 | 0 | 6 | 0 | — | | — | | 85 | 21 |
| São Paulo | 2022 | Série A | 14 | 1 | 3 | 0 | — | | 4 | 0 | — | | — | | 21 | 1 |
| São Paulo | 2023 | Série A | 0 | 0 | 0 | 0 | — | | 0 | 0 | 11 (Note: Appearances in Campeonato Paulista) | 8 | — | | 11 | 8 |
| São Paulo | 2024 | Série A | 13 | 0 | 2 | 0 | — | | 5 (Note: Appearances in Copa Libertadores) | 0 | 7 | 1 | 1 (Note: Appearance in Supercopa do Brasil) | 0 | 28 | 1 |
| São Paulo | Total | | 27 | 1 | 5 | 0 | — | | 9 | 0 | 18 | 9 | 1 | 0 | 60 | 10 |
| Career total | | | 100 | 21 | 9 | 1 | 2 | 0 | 15 | 0 | 18 | 9 | 1 | 0 | 145 | 31 |

== Honours ==
São Paulo

- Copa do Brasil: 2023
- Supercopa do Brasil: 2024

Individual

- Campeonato Paulista top scorer: 2023
