= Rodrigo Arciero =

Argentine footballer

Personal information
- Full name: Rodrigo Sebastián Arciero
- Date of birth: 12 March 1993 (age 33)
- Place of birth: Ushuaia, Argentina
- Height: 1.81 m (5 ft 11 1/2 in)
- Position: Right-back

Team information
- Current team: Deportivo Morón

Youth career
- Boca Juniors
- CAI

Senior career*
Years	Team	Apps	(Gls)
2014–2015	CAI	0	(0)
2014–2015	→ All Boys (loan)	53	(1)
2016	Talleres	1	(0)
2016–2017	Independiente Rivadavia	37	(0)
2017–2018	Patronato	13	(0)
2018–2021	Banfield	24	(0)
2021	SJK	22	(0)
2022–2023	Inter Turku	42	(0)
2024–	Deportivo Morón	11	(1)
- * Club domestic league appearances and goals as of 19 May 2024

Rodrigo Sebastián Arciero (born 12 March 1993) is an Argentine professional footballer who plays as a defender for Primera Nacional club Deportivo Morón.

== Career ==
Arciero began with youth spells in Boca Juniors and CAI. In 2014, Arciero joined Argentine Primera División side All Boys on loan. His professional debut arrived on 17 April versus Arsenal de Sarandí, which preceded him scoring his opening goal during a 4–2 defeat to Newell's Old Boys on 10 May. 2013–14 ended with relegation to Primera B Nacional. Arciero remained for two seasons in tier two, making forty-seven appearances in the process. In January 2016, Arciero was signed by newly promoted Primera B Nacional team Talleres. However, after just two appearances in all competitions he departed in July 2016.

On 21 July 2016, fellow Primera B Nacional club Independiente Rivadavia signed Arciero. Thirty-seven appearances followed throughout the 2016–17 campaign. In July 2017, Arciero joined Patronato of the Argentine Primera División. His debut for the club came on 9 September versus Argentinos Juniors. A move to Banfield was completed on 20 July 2018. After twenty-seven appearances across three seasons, including two in the Copa Sudamericana versus Defensa y Justicia, Arciero left for Finland in January 2021 after completing a transfer to Veikkausliiga side SJK for an undisclosed fee.

On 23 January 2022, he signed a contract with Inter Turku for the 2022 and 2023 seasons, with an option for 2024.

On 24 November 2023, it was announced that Arciero returns to Argentina, and had signed with Primera Nacional club Deportivo Morón.

== Career statistics ==
As of 20 March 2021

Appearances and goals by club, season and competition
Club	Season	League			National cup		League cup		Continental		Other		Total	
Club	Season	Division	Apps	Goals	Apps	Goals	Apps	Goals	Apps	Goals	Apps	Goals	Apps	Goals
CAI	2013–14	Torneo Argentino A	0	0	0	0	—		—		0	0	0	0
CAI	2014	Torneo Federal A	0	0	0	0	—		—		0	0	0	0
CAI	2015	Torneo Federal A	0	0	0	0	—		—		0	0	0	0
CAI	Total		0	0	0	0	—		—		0	0	0	0
All Boys (loan)	2013–14	Primera División	6	1	0	0	—		—		0	0	6	1
All Boys (loan)	2014	Primera B Nacional	18	0	0	0	—		—		0	0	18	0
All Boys (loan)	2015	Primera Nacional	29	0	1	0	—		—		0	0	30	0
All Boys (loan)	Total		53	1	1	0	—		—		0	0	54	1
Talleres	2016	Primera B Nacional	1	0	1	0	—		—		0	0	2	0
Independiente Rivadavia	2016–17	Primera B Nacional	37	0	0	0	—		—		0	0	37	0
Patronato	2017–18	Primera División	13	0	0	0	—		—		0	0	13	0
Banfield	2018–19	Primera División	14	0	0	0	0	0	2 (Note: Appearance(s) in the Copa Sudamericana)	0	0	0	16	0
Banfield	2019–20	Primera División	8	0	1	0	0	0	0	0	0	0	9	0
Banfield	2020–21	Primera División	2	0	0	0	0	0	0	0	0	0	2	0
Banfield	Total		24	0	1	0	0	0	2	0	0	0	27	0
SJK	2021	Veikkausliiga	22	0	4	0	0	0	—		0	0	26	0
Inter Turku	2022	Veikkausliiga	19	0	5	0	6 (Note: Includes Finnish League Cup)	0	2 (Note: Includes UEFA Europa Conference League)	0	–		32	0
Inter Turku	2023	Veikkausliiga	23	0	2	0	3	0	–		–		28	0
Inter Turku	Total		42	0	7	0	9	0	2	0	0	0	60	0
Deportivo Morón	2024	Primera Nacional	11	1	0	0	–		–		–		11	1
Career total			203	2	14	0	9	0	4	0	0	0	230	2

== Honours ==
Talleres

- Primera B Nacional: 2016
