= Jesús Dátolo =

Argentine footballer (born 1984)

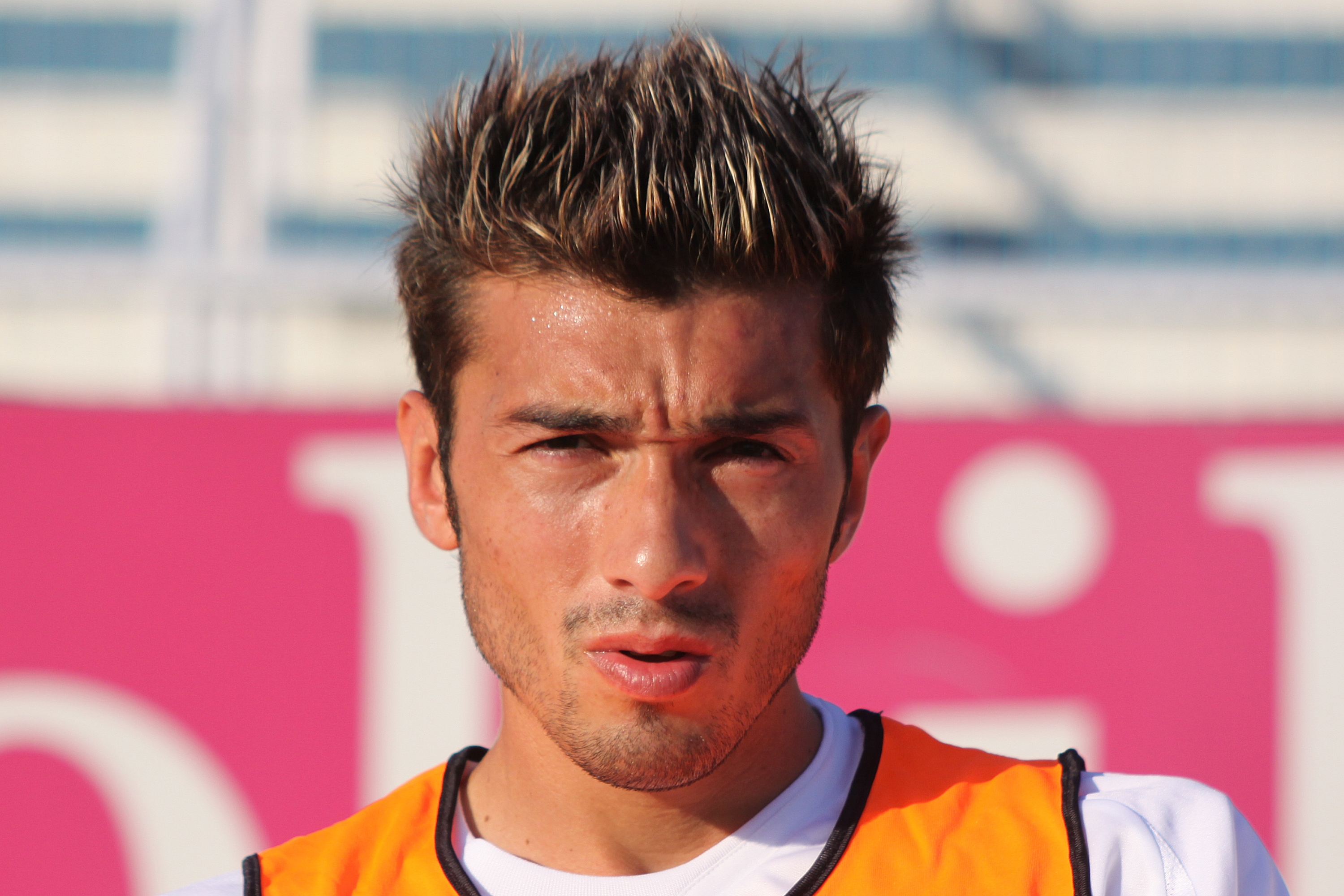

Personal information
- Full name: Jesús Alberto Dátolo
- Date of birth: 19 May 1984 (age 42)
- Place of birth: Carlos Spegazzini, Argentina
- Height: 1.75 m (5 ft 9 in)
- Positions: Attacking midfielder; winger

Youth career
- 2000–2002: Cañuelas
- 2002–2004: Banfield

Senior career*
Years	Team	Apps	(Gls)
2004–2006	Banfield	41	(6)
2006–2009	Boca Juniors	67	(5)
2009–2011	Napoli	22	(1)
2010	→ Olympiacos (loan)	17	(0)
2010–2011	→ Espanyol (loan)	14	(2)
2011–2012	Espanyol	15	(0)
2012–2013	Internacional	14	(1)
2013–2016	Atlético Mineiro	70	(13)
2017	Vitória	7	(2)
2017–2023	Banfield	78	(14)
2023	Tristán Suárez	19	(2)

International career
2009	Argentina	3	(2)
- * Club domestic league appearances and goals as of 20:26, 20 March 2022 (UTC)

Jesús Alberto Dátolo (born 19 May 1984) is an Argentine professional footballer who last played as a midfielder for Tristán Suárez.

== Club career ==
Dátolo started his career in 2000 at Cañuelas in Primera C Metropolitana, Argentina's fourth division. In 2002, he signed for Primera División club, Banfield and broke into the first team squad in 2005. He played with his future Boca Juniors colleagues Rodrigo Palacio and Gabriel Paletta. Dátolo moved to Boca Juniors during the mid-year transfer period of 2006. Boca bought 50% of his pass, and 100% of the sports rights.

He was a regular in the Boca starting line-up since the 2007 Apertura, where his performances gradually improved. He was a part of the Boca Juniors team that won the 2007 Copa Libertadores. In the 2008 Copa Libertadores, Datolo scored in Boca's 3–0 win against Venezuela's Maracaibo, as Boca progressed to the knock-out stages after being required to win by at least three goals. Datolo would again score in Boca's 2–1 first-leg win against Brazil's Cruzeiro at the Round of 16 stage. Boca reached the semi-final stage of the Copa Libertadores where which they were eliminated by Brazil's Fluminense. Boca Juniors went on to win the 2008 Torneo Apertura.

After the Torneo de Verano of January 2009 Dátolo would go on to sign for Italian Serie A club, Napoli. On 16 January 2010, it was announced that Napoli's 25-year-old midfielder would play on loan for Olympiacos until the end of the season. Datolo had asked Napoli for a transfer to gain regular game time, in order to secure a place in Argentina's team for the 2010 FIFA World Cup. Greek club Olympiacos had beaten off a deal with Datolo ahead of Paris Saint-Germain, who were chasing his signature as well.

Dátolo played for Internacional, after arriving from Espanyol. On 9 August 2013, he signed with Atlético Mineiro. After the end of his contract, Dátolo signed with Vitória in January 2017. He scored his first two goals on 15 February, including one direct from a corner.

== Career statistics ==
As of 18 October 2017

Club	Season	League		Cup		Continental		State League		Total	
Club	Season	Apps	Goals	Apps	Goals	Apps	Goals	Apps	Goals	Apps	Goals
Banfield	2004	12	0	0	0	0	0	-	-	12	0
Banfield	2005	27	5	0	0	0	0	-	-	27	5
Banfield	Total	39	5	0	0	0	0	0	0	39	5
Boca Juniors	2006	25	1	0	0	0	0	-	-	25	1
Boca Juniors	2007	24	4	0	0	2	1	-	-	26	5
Boca Juniors	2008	18	0	0	0	0	0	-	-	18	0
Boca Juniors	Total	67	5	0	0	2	1	0	0	69	6
Napoli	2008–09	9	0	0	0	0	0	-	-	9	0
Napoli	2009–10	13	1	0	0	0	0	-	-	13	1
Napoli	Total	22	1	0	0	0	0	0	0	22	1
Olympiacos (loan)	2010	8	0	0	0	2	0	-	-	10	0
Olympiacos (loan)	Total	8	0	0	0	2	0	0	0	10	0
Espanyol (loan)	2010–11	15	2	2	0	0	0	0	0	17	2
Espanyol (loan)	2011–12	5	0	2	0	0	0	-	-	7	0
Espanyol (loan)	Total	20	2	4	0	0	0	0	0	24	2
Internacional	2012	10	1	0	0	8	1	10	8	28	10
Internacional	2013	4	0	2	0	-	-	8	0	14	0
Internacional	Total	14	1	2	0	8	1	18	8	42	10
Atlético Mineiro	2013	11	1	0	0	0	0	0	0	11	1
Atlético Mineiro	2014	27	5	8	2	6	0	8	0	49	7
Atlético Mineiro	2015	26	7	2	0	7	0	7	2	42	9
Atlético Mineiro	2016	6	0	0	0	3	0	8	1	17	1
Atlético Mineiro	Total	70	13	10	2	16	0	23	3	119	18
Vitória	2017	0	0	1	0	-	-	3	2	4	2
Vitória	Total	0	0	1	0	0	0	3	2	4	2
Banfield	2017–18	5	0	2	0	-	-	0	0	7	0
Banfield	Total	5	0	2	0	-	-	0	0	7	0
Career Total		245	27	19	2	28	2	44	13	336	44

== International career ==
Dátolo made his international debut for Argentina in a friendly match against Russia in Moscow on 12 August 2009; he scored his first goal after just 20 seconds on the pitch. His first competitive goal came in a 3–1 loss against Brazil with a 30-yard shot.

=== International goals ===
#	Date	Venue	Opponent	Score	Result	Competition
1.	12 August 2009	Lokomotiv Stadium, Moscow, Russia	Russia	3–1	3–2	Friendly
2.	5 September 2009	Estadio Gigante de Arroyito, Rosario, Argentina	Brazil	1–2	1–3	2010 FIFA World Cup qualification

== Honours ==
Boca Juniors

- Recopa Sudamericana: 2006, 2008
- Copa Libertadores: 2007
- Argentine Primera División: Apertura 2008

Internacional

- Campeonato Gaúcho: 2012, 2013

Atlético Mineiro

- Recopa Sudamericana: 2014
- Copa do Brasil: 2014
- Campeonato Mineiro: 2015
