= Mauricio Asenjo =

Argentine footballer

Personal information
- Full name: Mauricio Gabriel Asenjo
- Date of birth: 23 July 1994 (age 32)
- Place of birth: Mendoza, Argentina
- Height: 1.83 m (6 ft 0 in)
- Position: Forward

Team information
- Current team: Los Andes

Youth career
- –2014: Banfield

Senior career*
Years	Team	Apps	(Gls)
2014–2020	Banfield	40	(3)
2016	→ Brown de Adrogué (loan)	21	(7)
2018	→ Gimnasia Jujuy (loan)	12	(3)
2018–2019	→ Indep. Rivadavia (loan)	21	(5)
2019–2020	→ Nueva Chicago (loan)	19	(5)
2021	Deportes La Serena		
2021	Independiente Rivadavia	17	(3)
2022	Seoul E-Land	19	(2)
2023–2024	Agropecuario	25	(3)
2024–2025	Independiente Rivadavia	20	(1)
2025–	Los Andes	40	(10)
- * Club domestic league appearances and goals as of 17:23, 29 April 2026 (UTC)

Mauricio Asenjo (born 23 July 1994) is an Argentine footballer who plays as a forward for Los Andes in the Primera Nacional.

== Career ==
=== Seoul E-Land FC ===
Asenjo joined Seoul E-Land FC on February 6, 2022.

He scored his first goal in the club at an away match against Gimpo FC held in March 12.

He left the club at the end of the season.
