= Juan Álvarez (footballer, born February 1996) =

Argentine footballer

Personal information
- Full name: Juan Pablo Álvarez
- Date of birth: 10 February 1996 (age 30)
- Place of birth: Tandil, Argentina
- Height: 1.75 m (5 ft 9 in)
- Position: Winger

Team information
- Current team: San Lorenzo
- Number: 22

Youth career
- 2011–2017: Banfield

Senior career*
| Years | Team | Apps | (Gls) |
| 2017–2025 | Banfield | 150 | (11) |
| 2022–2023 | → Colón (loan) | 40 | (1) |
| 2025–2026 | Cerro | 4 | (1) |
| 2026 | Gimnasia Mendoza | 1 | (0) |
| 2026– | San Lorenzo | 6 | (0) |
- * Club domestic league appearances and goals as of 18:02, 21 November 2026 (UTC)

Juan Pablo Álvarez (born 10 February 1996) is an Argentine professional footballer who plays as a winger for San Lorenzo.

== Career ==
Álvarez began his career with Banfield, with whom he had two separate youth spells. He appeared for the first-team for the first time on the substitutes bench in May 2017 for an Argentine Primera División match against Atlético Tucumán, before making his first-team debut on 1 September in a Copa Argentina Round of 32 win versus Atlético de Rafaela. His league debut came just over a week later against River Plate, he played the final seventeen minutes in a 3–1 defeat. On 3 October, Álvarez scored the first goal of his senior career in a league loss to Arsenal de Sarandí.

== Career statistics ==
As of 15 May 2018.

Club statistics
| Club | Season | League | | | Cup (Note: Includes the Copa Argentina) | | League Cup | | Continental (Note: Includes the Copa Libertadores) | | Other | | Total | |
| Club | Season | Division | Apps | Goals | Apps | Goals | Apps | Goals | Apps | Goals | Apps | Goals | Apps | Goals |
|---|---|---|---|---|---|---|---|---|---|---|---|---|---|---|
| Banfield | 2016–17 | Primera División | 0 | 0 | 0 | 0 | — | | — | | 0 | 0 | 0 | 0 |
| Banfield | 2017–18 | Primera División | 24 | 1 | 2 | 0 | — | | 3 (Note: Three appearances in 2018 Copa Libertadores) | 0 | 0 | 0 | 29 | 1 |
| Career total | | | 24 | 1 | 2 | 0 | — | | 3 | 0 | 0 | 0 | 29 | 1 |
