= 2017–18 Club Atlético Banfield season =

Banfield
2017–18 season
- Chairman: Eduardo Spinosa
- Manager: Julio César Falcioni
- Stadium: Estadio Florencio Sola
- Primera División: 16th
- 2016–17 Copa Argentina: Round of 16
- 2017–18 Copa Argentina: Round of 64
- Copa Libertadores: Second stage
- Top goalscorer: League: Two players (5); All: Two players (5)

The 2017–18 season was Banfield's 5th consecutive season in the top-flight of Argentine football. The season covered the period from 1 July 2017 to 30 June 2018.

== Current squad ==
As of 24 August 2017.

Note: Flags indicate national team as defined under FIFA eligibility rules; some limited exceptions apply. Players may hold more than one non-FIFA nationality.

No.	Pos.	Nation	Player
4	DF	ARG	Gonzalo Bettini
6	DF	ARG	Alexis Sosa
8	MF	ARG	Nicolás Bertolo (on loan from River Plate)
11	MF	ARG	Luciano Civelli
12	GK	COL	Iván Arboleda
16	FW	ARG	Claudio Villagra
17	FW	ARG	Agustín Fontana
18	MF	ARG	Mauricio Sperduti
19	FW	ARG	Mauricio Asenjo
20	FW	ARG	Darío Cvitanich
22	FW	ARG	Juan Álvarez

No.	Pos.	Nation	Player
23	DF	ARG	Renato Civelli
24	MF	ARG	Luciano Gómez
27	GK	ARG	Facundo Altamirano
28	MF	ARG	Franco Colela
29	MF	ARG	Eric Remedi
30	DF	ARG	Jorge Rodríguez
33	DF	ARG	Adrián Sporle
—	MF	ARG	Jesús Dátolo
—	FW	ARG	Juan García
—	FW	ARG	Pablo Mouche (on loan from Palmeiras)

=== Out on loan ===
Note: Flags indicate national team as defined under FIFA eligibility rules; some limited exceptions apply. Players may hold more than one non-FIFA nationality.

No.	Pos.	Nation	Player
10	FW	ARG	Brian Sarmiento (at Newell's Old Boys until 30 June 2018)
—	MF	ARG	Enzo Trinidad (at Defensores de Belgrano until 30 June 2018)

== Transfers ==
=== In ===
Date	Pos.	Name	From	Fee
1 July 2017	MF	(Argentina) Jesús Dátolo	(Brazil) Vitória	Undisclosed

=== Out ===
Date	Pos.	Name	To	Fee
1 July 2017	MF	(Argentina) Juan Manuel Cobo	Released (Note: Following his release, Cobo signed for Independiente Rivadavia.)	
21 July 2017	MF	(Chile) Thomas Rodríguez	(Italy) Genoa	Undisclosed
27 July 2017	MF	(Argentina) Emanuel Cecchini	(Spain) Málaga	Undisclosed
1 August 2017	DF	(Argentina) Alexis Soto	(Argentina) Racing Club	Undisclosed
3 August 2017	DF	(Argentina) Carlos Matheu	(Argentina) Huracán	Undisclosed
4 August 2017	GK	(Argentina) Hilario Navarro	(Argentina) Boca Unidos	Undisclosed
13 August 2017	MF	(Argentina) Lihué Prichoda	(Argentina) Gimnasia y Esgrima	Undisclosed
14 August 2017	MF	(Argentina) Jonathan Requena	(Argentina) Defensa y Justicia	Undisclosed
14 August 2017	MF	(Argentina) Miguel Escobar	(Malta) Senglea Athletic	Undisclosed

=== Loan in ===
Date from	Date to	Pos.	Name	From
18 July 2017	30 June 2018	FW	(Argentina) Pablo Mouche	(Brazil) Palmeiras
1 August 2017	30 June 2018	MF	(Argentina) Nicolás Bertolo	(Argentina) River Plate

=== Loan out ===
Date from	Date to	Pos.	Name	To
20 July 2017	30 June 2018	FW	(Argentina) Brian Sarmiento	(Argentina) Newell's Old Boys
31 July 2017	30 June 2018	MF	(Argentina) Enzo Trinidad	(Argentina) Defensores de Belgrano

== Friendlies ==
=== Pre-season ===
Win Draw Loss

29 July 2017 Friendly	Vélez Sarsfield (Argentina)	0–1	(Argentina) Banfield	Buenos Aires, Argentina
10:00		Report	R. Civelli 19'	Stadium: Villa Olímpica de Ituzaingó

29 July 2017 Friendly	Vélez Sarsfield (Argentina)	1–1	(Argentina) Banfield	Buenos Aires, Argentina
	J. Correa	Report	C. Villagra	Stadium: Villa Olímpica de Ituzaingó

3 August 2017 Friendly	Nacional (Uruguay)	3–2	(Argentina) Banfield	Paysandú, Uruguay
20:00	H. Silveira 76', 87'; S. Fernández (pen.)	Report	J. Rodríguez 48'; D. Cvitanich 69'	Stadium: Estadio Parque Artigas

8 August 2017 Copa Provincia de Salta	Boca Juniors (Argentina)	1–1 (4–2 p)	(Argentina) Banfield	Salta, Argentina
20:00	E. Cardona 50'	Report	M. Sperduti 4'	Stadium: Estadio Padre Ernesto Martearena; Referee: Pablo Dóvalo (Argentina)
	Penalties
	Penalty scored		Penalty scored Penalty missed

19 August 2017 Friendly	Banfield (Argentina)	1–0	(Argentina) Platense	Buenos Aires, Argentina
	J. Dátolo 28'	Report		Stadium: Campo de Deportes Luis Guillón

== Primera División ==
=== League table ===
Pos	Team	Pld	W	D	L	GF	GA	GD	Pts
15	Atlético Tucumán	27	8	12	7	29	26	+3	36
16	Estudiantes (LP)	27	10	6	11	25	26	−1	36
17	Banfield	27	9	8	10	27	24	+3	35
18	San Martín (SJ)	27	9	6	12	30	36	−6	33
19	Patronato	27	8	9	10	26	32	−6	33

Source: AFA
Rules for classification: 1) points; 2) play-off (only if needed to decide championship); 3) goal difference; 4) goals scored; 5) head-to-head points; 6) head-to-head goal difference; 7) head-to-head goals scored.

=== Results by matchday ===
Matchday	1	2	3	4	5	6	7	8	9	10	11	12	13	14	15	16	17	18	19	20	21	22	23	24	25	26	27
Ground	H	A	H	A	H	A	H	A	H	H	A	H	A														
Result	W	L	W	W	L	D	D	W	D	L	L	L															
Position	7	14	8	3	5	9	11	7	7	10	14	16															

Updated to match(es) played on 12 December 2017. Source: Soccerway
A = Away; H = Home; W = Win; D = Draw; L = Loss

25 August 2017 1	Banfield (Argentina)	2–1	(Argentina) Belgrano	Banfield, Argentina
21:05	G. Bettini 13'; D. Cvitanich 15' (pen.)	Report	C. Lema 88'	Stadium: Estadio Florencio Sola; Referee: Germán Delfino (Argentina)

10 September 2017 2	River Plate (Argentina)	3–1	(Argentina) Banfield	Buenos Aires, Argentina
18:05	J. Pinola 18'; G. Martínez 43'; I. Scocco 73' (pen.)	Report	R. Civelli 2'	Stadium: Estadio Monumental Antonio Vespucio Liberti; Referee: Néstor Pitana (Argentina)

17 September 2017 3	Banfield (Argentina)	1–0	(Argentina) Racing Club	Banfield, Argentina
16:05	D. Cvitanich 18'	Report		Stadium: Estadio Florencio Sola; Referee: Ariel Penel (Argentina)

24 September 2017 4	Rosario Central (Argentina)	0–4	(Argentina) Banfield	Rosario, Argentina
16:05		Report	D. Cvitanich 21', 31' (pen.); P. Mouche 58'; M. Sperduti 79'	Stadium: Estadio Gigante de Arroyito; Referee: Mauro Vigliano (Argentina)

2 October 2017 5	Banfield (Argentina)	1–2	(Argentina) Arsenal de Sarandí	Banfield, Argentina
19:05	J. Álvarez 12'	Report	F. Milo 65'; G. Ferreyra 87'	Stadium: Estadio Florencio Sola; Referee: Jorge Baliño (Argentina)

14 October 2017 6	Estudiantes (Argentina)	1–1	(Argentina) Banfield	La Plata, Argentina
16:15	P. Lugüercio 81'	Report	P. Mouche 38'	Stadium: Estadio Ciudad de La Plata; Referee: Andrés Merlos (Argentina)

27 October 2017 7	Banfield (Argentina)	1–1	(Argentina) Colón	Banfield, Argentina
19:05	M. Sperduti 63' (pen.)	Report	D. Vera 34'	Stadium: Estadio Florencio Sola; Referee: Darío Herrera (Argentina)

4 November 2017 8	San Lorenzo (Argentina)	0–1	(Argentina) Banfield	Buenos Aires, Argentina
16:15		Report	P. Mouche 17'	Stadium: Estadio Pedro Bidegain; Referee: Germán Delfino (Argentina)

18 November 2017 9	Banfield (Argentina)	0–0	(Argentina) Temperley	Banfield, Argentina
17:00		Report		Stadium: Estadio Florencio Sola; Referee: Hernán Mastrángelo (Argentina)

24 November 2017 10	Banfield (Argentina)	0–1	(Argentina) Defensa y Justicia	Banfield, Argentina
17:00		Report	J. Kaprof 11'	Stadium: Estadio Florencio Sola; Referee: Fernando Espinoza (Argentina)

4 December 2017 11	San Martín (Argentina)	2–1	(Argentina) Banfield	San Juan, Argentina
21:30	M. Rodríguez 3'; G. Carabajal 18'	Report	G. Bettini 50'	Stadium: Estadio Ingeniero Hilario Sánchez; Referee: Silvio Trucco (Argentina)

9 December 2017 12	Banfield (Argentina)	2–3	(Argentina) Argentinos Juniors	Banfield, Argentina
17:00	J. Carranza 27', 59'	Report	B. Romero 6', 69'; J. Cabrera 32'	Stadium: Estadio Florencio Sola; Referee: Andrés Merlos (Argentina)

January 2018 13	Tigre (Argentina)	–	(Argentina) Banfield	Buenos Aires, Argentina
		Report		Stadium: Estadio José Dellagiovanna

== Copa Argentina ==
Win Draw Loss

1 September 2017 R32	Atlético de Rafaela (Argentina)	2–4	(Argentina) Banfield	Formosa, Argentina
21:10	J. Velázquez 47'; G. Klusener 47'	Report	P. Mouche 3', 29'; N. Bertolo 19'; G. Bettini 43'	Stadium: Estadio Antonio Romero; Referee: Federico Beligoy (Argentina)

28 September 2017 R16	Godoy Cruz (Argentina)	2–1	(Argentina) Banfield	Avellaneda, Argentina
17:00	V. Ramis 21'; G. Giménez 64'	Report	D. Cvitanich 45'	Stadium: Estadio Presidente Juan Domingo Perón; Referee: Federico Beligoy (Argentina)

== Copa Libertadores ==
Win Draw Loss

–
