= 2018–19 Club Atlético Boca Juniors season =

Boca Juniors
2018–19 season
- President: (Argentina) Daniel Angelici
- Manager: (Argentina) Guillermo Barros Schelotto (until December 14) (Argentina) Gustavo Alfaro (from January 2)
- Stadium: Estadio Alberto J. Armando
- Primera División: 3rd
- Copa de la Superliga: Runners-up
- 2017–18 Copa Argentina: Round of 16
- 2018–19 Copa Argentina: Round of 32
- Supercopa Argentina: Winners
- 2018 Copa Libertadores: Runners-up
- 2019 Copa Libertadores: Group Stage
- Top goalscorer: League: Mauro Zárate; Ramón Ábila (6); All: Mauro Zárate (15)
Home colours	Away colours	Third colours

The 2018–19 Club Atlético Boca Juniors season was the 90th consecutive Primera División season for the senior squad. During the season, Boca Juniors took part in the Primera División, Copa de la Superliga, 2017–18 Copa Argentina, 2018–19 Copa Argentina, Supercopa Argentina, Final Stages of the 2018 Copa Libertadores and in the Group Stage of the 2019 Copa Libertadores.

== Season overview ==
=== June ===
Frank Fabra is ruled out of the 2018 FIFA World Cup after sustaining an anterior cruciate ligament tear in his left knee, also, he will miss the entire 2018 Copa Libertadores. On June 27 Boca announced that Sebastián Villa is the first signing of the season, after reaching an agreement with Colombian champions Deportes Tolima.

=== July ===
Gino Peruzzi, Nicolás Colazo, Tomás Pochettino, Marcelo Torres, Franco Cristaldo, Nicolás Benegas and Nazareno Solís returned from their loans. Oscar Benítez returned to their club after a loan spell in Boca. Franco Cristaldo and Nazareno Solís are loaned to San Martín (SJ) and Nicolás Benegas is loaned to Brown. On July 6, two players arrive to the club: Carlos Izquierdoz is purchased from Santos Laguna and Mauro Zárate is purchased from Watford. Marcelo Torres is loaned to Banfield. On July 16 Walter Bou is loaned to Vitória and Nicolás Colazo is loaned to Aris. Left back Lucas Olaza is loaned from Talleres (C), in the operation Tomás Pochettino and Gonzalo Maroni are loaned to Talleres (C).

=== August ===
The first official match of the season is a 6–0 win against Alvarado in the Round of 64 of Copa Argentina, in the next round Boca will face San Martín (T). On August 2, Boca and Lanús reached an agreement for the transfer of goalkeeper Esteban Andrada while Guillermo Sara is transferred to Lanús. In the first game of the Round of 16 of Copa Libertadores, Boca achieved a great victory 2–0 against Libertad. Guido Vadalá is loaned to Universidad de Concepción. The first match of the Argentinian tournament was a 1–0 victory over Talleres (C). Boca played awful and lost 2–0 against Estudiantes (LP), Boca's 46 rounds as leader came to the end. The level did not improved and Boca drew 0–0 against Huracán. Boca and Santiago Vergini agreed to mutually terminate the defender's contract, Vergini subsequently joined Bursaspor. In the second leg of the Round of 16 of Copa Libertadores, Boca won 4–2 against Libertad and advanced to the Quarterfinals, facing Brazilian team Cruzeiro.

=== September ===
Boca improved the level and managed to win 3–0 over Vélez Sarsfield. Sebastián Pérez Cardona is loaned to Pachuca. Boca advanced to the Round of 16 after a 2–0 win over San Martín (T). On September 15, Boca won 1-0 a really though match against Argentinos Juniors. In the first leg of the Quarterfinals of Copa Libertadores, Boca won 2–0 against Cruzeiro. Boca played a bad game and lost 2-0 the Superclásico against River Plate. Boca was eliminated of the 2017–18 Copa Argentina after an awful defeat against Gimnasia y Esgrima (LP). On the last match of September, Boca won 3–1 over Colón.

=== October ===
In the second leg of the Quarterfinals of Copa Libertadores, Boca drew 1–1 against Cruzeiro and advanced to the Semifinals, facing Brazilian team Palmeiras. On October, 7 Boca drew 2–2 against Racing. Goalkeeper Carlos Lampe signs with Boca on a three-month loan from Huachipato. On October 20, Boca drew 0–0 against Rosario Central. In the first leg of the Semifinals of Copa Libertadores, Boca played a great match and won 2–0 over Palmeiras. On October 27, the reserve team played and lost 2–1 against Gimnasia y Esgrima (LP). Boca qualified to the Finals of the 2018 Copa Libertadores after defeating Palmeiras, and will face old time rival River Plate in an unprecedented edition of the Superclásico. Boca also becomes the team with most finals disputed in the history of Copa Libertadores.

=== November ===
In the first match of the month, Boca won 4–1 against Tigre. The first leg of the 2018 Copa Libertadores Finals ended in a 2–2 draw, a very disputed match. On the round 13 of Superliga, Boca defeated Patronato 1–0.

=== December ===
In the first match of the month, Boca won 1–0 against Independiente. Boca lost the 2018 Copa Libertadores after losing 3–1 in the finals against old rival River Plate. Guillermo Barros Schelotto is no longer the coach of Boca, after two years that included two Argentine League trophies. Edwin Cardona finished his loan with the club and returned to Monterrey.

=== January ===
Gustavo Alfaro is appointed as the new manager of the club. Cristian Espinoza and Carlos Lampe finished their loans with the club and returned to Villarreal and Huachipato. Nahuel Molina returned from their loan on Defensa y Justicia. On January 2, Boca and Ajax reached an agreement for the transfer of defender Lisandro Magallán. Central defender Júnior Alonso is loaned from Lille. Sebastián Pérez Cardona is loaned to Barcelona. Goalkeeper Marcos Díaz signed with the club. Boca and Borussia Dortmund reached an agreement for the transfer of defender Leonardo Balerdi. Gonzalo Lamardo is loaned to San Martín (T). Jorman Campuzano is purchased from Atlético Nacional and Iván Marcone is purchased from Cruz Azul. On January 18, Boca and San Lorenzo reached an agreement for the transfer of defender Gino Peruzzi. Pablo Pérez is loaned to Independiente, and Leonardo Jara is loaned to D.C. United. Nahuel Molina is loaned to Rosario Central. The first match of the year was a 1–1 against Newell's Old Boys. Right back Kevin Mac Allister is loaned from Argentinos Juniors. Nicolás Colazo is loaned to Tigre and Mateo Retegui is loaned to Estudiantes (LP). Central defender Lisandro López is loaned from Benfica. Boca purchases a percentage of Lucas Olaza from Talleres (C) and is loaned to Celta de Vigo. Walter Bou is loaned to Unión La Calera. Boca won 4–0 against San Martín (SJ) in one of the matches postponed.

=== February ===
Boca and Zenit Saint Petersburg reached an agreement for the transfer of defensive midfielder Wílmar Barrios. Boca won Godoy Cruz 2–0. Agustín Heredia is loaned to Godoy Cruz. On February 10, Boca travelled to Córdoba and drew 1–1 against Belgrano. On February 17 Boca defeated Lanús 2–1. Boca lost 2–1 against Atlético Tucumán in one of the matches postponed. Agustín Rossi is loaned to Deportes Antofagasta. On February 24 Boca won 1–0 against Defensa y Justicia.

=== March ===
On March 1 Boca won 3–1 against Unión. In the beginning of 2019 Copa Libertadores Boca draw Jorge Wilstermann 0-0. On March 9 Boca won 3–0 against San Lorenzo. On March 12 Boca won 3–0 over Deportes Tolima. On March 14, Boca and Fernando Gago agreed to a contract termination; he played 199 games and won 9 titles. On March 9 Boca won 4–1 against San Martín (T) and qualified for 2020 Copa Libertadores. On March 29 Boca won 2–0 against Banfield.

=== April ===
On April 2 Boca lost 3–0 against Athletico Paranaense. In the final round of Superliga, Boca drew 1–1 against Aldosivi and ended the League in the third position. On April 10 Boca won 4–0 against Jorge Wilstermann. On April 19 Boca won the first match of 2018–19 Copa Argentina 2–0 against Estudiantes (RC). On April 24 Boca draw 2–2 against Deportes Tolima in Copa Libertadores. On April 28 Boca won 2–1 against Godoy Cruz in Copa de la Superliga.

=== May ===
On May 2 Boca won the Supercopa Argentina against Rosario Central defeating them 6–5 in penalties after a 0–0 draw. On May 5 Boca advanced to the quarterfinals of Copa de la Superliga by winning 3–1 against Godoy Cruz. On May 9 Boca Won 2–1 against Athletico Paranaense and clinched the first place in the Group G of Copa Libertadores. On May 12, Boca draw Vélez Sarsfield 0–0 in the first leg of Copa de la Superliga quarterfinals. On May 16, Boca won 5–4 in penalties after another 0–0 draw against Vélez Sarsfield and advanced to the semifinals. On May 19, Boca draw Argentinos Juniors 0–0 in the first leg of Copa de la Superliga semifinals. On May 26, Boca won 1–0 against Argentinos Juniors and advanced to the Copa de la Superliga final.

=== June ===
On June 2 Boca played the last match of the season, a 2–0 defeat against Tigre in the final of the Copa de la Superliga.

== Squad ==
Last updated on June 3, 2019.

Squad no.	Name	Nationality	Position	Date of birth (age)	Apps	Goals	Signed from	Note
Goalkeepers
12	Marcos Díaz	(Argentina)	GK	February 5, 1986 (age 40)	2	-1	(Argentina) Huracán	
28	Manuel Roffo	(Argentina)	GK	April 4, 2000 (age 26)	0	0	(Argentina) Academy	
31	Esteban Andrada	(Argentina)	GK	January 26, 1991 (age 35)	37	-24	(Argentina) Lanús	
Defenders
2	Paolo Goltz	(Argentina)	DF	May 12, 1985 (age 41)	39	1	(Mexico) América	Injured
3	Emmanuel Mas	(Argentina)	DF	January 15, 1989 (age 37)	45	4	(Turkey) Trabzonspor	
4	Julio Buffarini	(Argentina)	DF	August 18, 1988 (age 38)	50	1	(Brazil) São Paulo	
6	Júnior Alonso	(Paraguay)	DF	February 9, 1993 (age 33)	13	0	(France) Lille	
13	Kevin Mac Allister	(Argentina)	DF	November 7, 1997 (age 28)	2	0	(Argentina) Argentinos Juniors	
18	Frank Fabra	(Colombia)	DF	February 22, 1991 (age 35)	67	7	(Colombia) Independiente Medellín	
20	Lisandro López	(Argentina)	DF	September 1, 1989 (age 37)	21	4	(Portugal) Benfica	
24	Carlos Izquierdoz (VC 3º)	(Argentina)	DF	November 3, 1988 (age 37)	38	1	(Mexico) Santos Laguna	
42	Marcelo Weigandt	(Argentina)	DF	January 11, 2000 (age 26)	3	0	(Argentina) Academy	
Midfielders
15	Nahitan Nández	(Uruguay)	MF	December 28, 1995 (age 30)	65	6	(Uruguay) Peñarol	
23	Iván Marcone	(Argentina)	MF	June 3, 1990 (age 36)	23	0	(Mexico) Cruz Azul	
27	Jorman Campuzano	(Colombia)	MF	April 30, 1996 (age 30)	16	0	(Colombia) Atlético Nacional	
30	Emanuel Reynoso	(Argentina)	MF	November 16, 1995 (age 30)	41	2	(Argentina) Talleres (C)	Injured
37	Nicolás Capaldo	(Argentina)	MF	September 14, 1998 (age 28)	4	0	(Argentina) Academy	
39	Agustín Almendra	(Argentina)	MF	February 11, 2000 (age 26)	27	1	(Argentina) Academy	
40	Julián Chicco	(Argentina)	MF	January 13, 1998 (age 28)	10	0	(Argentina) Academy	
Forwards
7	Cristian Pavón	(Argentina)	FW	January 21, 1996 (age 30)	127	32	(Argentina) Talleres (C)	
9	Darío Benedetto (VC 2º)	(Argentina)	FW	May 17, 1990 (age 36)	76	45	(Mexico) América	
10	Carlos Tevez (C)	(Argentina)	FW	February 5, 1984 (age 42)	223	76	(China) Shanghai Shenhua	
17	Ramón Ábila	(Argentina)	FW	October 14, 1989 (age 36)	49	22	(Brazil) Cruzeiro	
19	Mauro Zárate	(Argentina)	FW	March 18, 1987 (age 39)	47	15	(England) Watford	
22	Sebastián Villa	(Colombia)	FW	May 19, 1996 (age 30)	38	3	(Colombia) Deportes Tolima	
27	Brandon Cortés	(Argentina)	FW	June 26, 2001 (age 25)	2	0	(Argentina) Academy	
34	Agustín Obando	(Argentina)	FW	March 11, 2000 (age 26)	6	0	(Argentina) Academy	

== Transfers ==
=== In ===
==== Winter ====
Players transferred
Date	Pos.	Name	Club	Fee
June 2018	DF	(Colombia) Sebastián Villa	(Colombia) Deportes Tolima	$2.100.000
July 2018	DF	(Argentina) Carlos Izquierdoz	(Mexico) Santos Laguna	Undisclosed
July 2018	FW	(Argentina) Mauro Zárate	(England) Watford	Undisclosed
August 2018	GK	(Argentina) Esteban Andrada	(Argentina) Lanús	Undisclosed

Players loaned
Start date	Pos.	Name	Club	End date
July 2018	DF	(Uruguay) Lucas Olaza	(Argentina) Talleres (C)	June 2019
October 2018	GK	(Bolivia) Carlos Lampe	(Chile) Huachipato	December 2018

Loan Return
Date	Pos.	Name	Return from
June 2018	DF	(Argentina) Gino Peruzzi	(Uruguay) Nacional
June 2018	DF	(Argentina) Nicolás Colazo	(Argentina) Gimnasia y Esgrima (LP)
June 2018	MF	(Argentina) Tomás Pochettino	(Argentina) Defensa y Justicia
June 2018	MF	(Argentina) Franco Cristaldo	(Argentina) Defensa y Justicia
June 2018	FW	(Argentina) Marcelo Torres	(Argentina) Talleres (C)
June 2018	FW	(Argentina) Nicolás Benegas	(Argentina) San Martín (T)
June 2018	FW	(Argentina) Nazareno Solís	(Argentina) Huracán

==== Summer ====
Players transferred
Date	Pos.	Name	Club	Fee
January 2019	GK	(Argentina) Marcos Díaz	(Argentina) Huracán	Free
January 2019	DF	(Uruguay) Lucas Olaza	(Argentina) Talleres (C)	Undisclosed
January 2019	MF	(Colombia) Jorman Campuzano	(Colombia) Atlético Nacional	Undisclosed
January 2019	MF	(Argentina) Iván Marcone	(Mexico) Cruz Azul	Undisclosed

Players loaned
Start date	Pos.	Name	Club	End date
January 2019	DF	(Paraguay) Júnior Alonso	(France) Lille	June 2020
January 2019	DF	(Argentina) Lisandro López	(Portugal) Benfica	December 2019
January 2019	DF	(Argentina) Kevin Mac Allister	(Argentina) Argentinos Juniors	December 2019

Loan return
Date	Pos.	Name	Return from
December 2018	DF	(Argentina) Nahuel Molina	(Argentina) Defensa y Justicia
December 2018	MF	(Argentina) Nicolás Colazo	(Greece) Aris
December 2018	MF	(Colombia) Sebastián Pérez Cardona	(Mexico) Pachuca
December 2018	FW	(Argentina) Walter Bou	(Brazil) Vitória

=== Out ===
==== Winter ====
Players transferred
Date	Pos.	Name	Club	Fee
August 2018	GK	(Argentina) Guillermo Sara	(Argentina) Lanús	Undisclosed
August 2018	DF	(Argentina) Santiago Vergini	(Turkey) Bursaspor	Undisclosed

Players loaned
Start date	Pos.	Name	Club	End date
July 2018	DF	(Argentina) Nicolás Colazo	(Greece) Aris	June 2019
July 2018	MF	(Argentina) Franco Cristaldo	(Argentina) San Martín (SJ)	June 2019
July 2018	MF	(Argentina) Gonzalo Maroni	(Argentina) Talleres (C)	June 2019
August 2018	MF	(Colombia) Sebastián Pérez Cardona	(Mexico) Pachuca	June 2019
July 2018	MF	(Argentina) Tomás Pochettino	(Argentina) Talleres (C)	June 2019
July 2018	FW	(Argentina) Nicolás Benegas	(Argentina) Brown	June 2019
July 2018	FW	(Argentina) Walter Bou	(Brazil) Vitória	June 2019
July 2018	FW	(Argentina) Nazareno Solís	(Argentina) San Martín (SJ)	June 2019
July 2018	FW	(Argentina) Marcelo Torres	(Argentina) Banfield	June 2019
August 2018	FW	(Argentina) Guido Vadalá	(Chile) Universidad de Concepción	June 2019

Loan return
Date	Pos.	Name	Return to
June 2018	FW	(Argentina) Oscar Benítez	(Portugal) Benfica

==== Summer ====
Players transferred
Date	Pos.	Name	Club	Fee
January 2019	DF	(Argentina) Leonardo Balerdi	(Germany) Borussia Dortmund	Undisclosed
January 2019	DF	(Argentina) Lisandro Magallán	(Netherlands) Ajax	Undisclosed
January 2019	DF	(Argentina) Gino Peruzzi	(Argentina) San Lorenzo	$800.000
February 2019	MF	(Colombia) Wílmar Barrios	(Russia) Zenit Saint Petersburg	Undisclosed
March 2019	MF	(Argentina) Fernando Gago	None	None

Players loaned
Start date	Pos.	Name	Club	End date
February 2019	GK	(Argentina) Agustín Rossi	(Chile) Deportes Antofagasta	December 2019
February 2019	DF	(Argentina) Agustín Heredia	(Argentina) Godoy Cruz	June 2020
January 2019	DF	(Argentina) Nahuel Molina	(Argentina) Rosario Central	December 2019
January 2019	DF	(Uruguay) Lucas Olaza	(Spain) Celta de Vigo	June 2020
January 2019	MF	(Argentina) Nicolás Colazo	(Argentina) Tigre	December 2019
January 2019	MF	(Argentina) Leonardo Jara	(United States) D.C. United	June 2020
January 2019	MF	(Argentina) Gonzalo Lamardo	(Argentina) San Martín (T)	December 2019
January 2019	MF	(Argentina) Pablo Pérez	(Argentina) Independiente	June 2021
January 2019	MF	(Colombia) Sebastián Pérez Cardona	(Ecuador) Barcelona	December 2019
January 2019	FW	(Argentina) Walter Bou	(Chile) Unión La Calera	June 2020
January 2019	FW	(Italy) Mateo Retegui	(Argentina) Estudiantes (LP)	June 2020

Loan return
Date	Pos.	Name	Return to
December 2018	GK	(Bolivia) Carlos Lampe	(Chile) Huachipato
December 2018	MF	(Colombia) Edwin Cardona	(Mexico) Monterrey
December 2018	FW	(Argentina) Cristian Espinoza	(Spain) Villarreal

== Pre-season and friendlies ==
Win Draw Loss Postponed

=== Winter ===
July 20, 2018 Pre-season	Boca Juniors (Argentina)	4–2	(Colombia) Independiente Medellín	Boca Ratón, United States
20:10	Zárate; Villa; Almendra; Tevez	Report	Cano; Pertúz	Stadium: FAU Stadium

July 24, 2018 Pre-season	Colorado Rapids (United States)	2–2 (5–4 p)	(Argentina) Boca Juniors	Commerce City, United States
22:00	Boli 30'; Martínez 59'	Report	Barrios 11'; Villa 14'	Stadium: Dick's Sporting Goods Park
	Penalties
	McBean (penalty scored); Serna (penalty scored); Martínez (penalty scored); Wynne (penalty scored); MacMath (penalty scored)		(penalty scored) Cardona; (penalty scored) Goltz; (penalty missed) Reynoso; (penalty scored) Zárate; (penalty scored) Tevez

==== Joan Gamper Trophy ====
15 August 2018 Pre-season	Barcelona (Spain)	3–0	(Argentina) Boca Juniors	Barcelona, Spain
13:15	Malcom 18'; Vidal (yellow card) 33'; Messi 39'; Rafinha 67'; Busquets (yellow card) 80'	Report; Report		Stadium: Camp Nou; Referee: Alberto Undiano Mallenco

=== Summer ===
January 16, 2019 Pre-season	Boca Juniors	0–2	Unión	Mar del Plata
22:00				Stadium: José María Minella

January 20, 2019 Pre-season	Boca Juniors	2–1	Aldosivi	Mar del Plata
22:00				Stadium: José María Minella

== Competitions ==
=== Overall ===
Competition	First match	Last match	Starting round	Final position	Record							
Competition	First match	Last match	Starting round	Final position	Pld	W	D	L	GF	GA	GD	Win %
Primera División	12 August 2018	7 April 2019	Matchday 1	3rd	25	15	6	4	42	18	+24	60.00
Copa de la Superliga	28 April 2019	TBD	Round of 16	Runners-up	7	3	3	1	6	4	+2	42.86
2017–18 Copa Argentina	1 August 2018	27 September 2018	Round of 64	Round of 16	3	2	0	1	8	1	+7	66.67
2018–19 Copa Argentina	19 April 2019		Round of 64	Round of 32^{1}	1	1	0	0	2	0	+2	100.00
Supercopa Argentina	2 May 2019		Final	Winners	1	0	1	0	0	0	+0	0.00
2018 Copa Libertadores	8 August 2018	9 December 2018	Round of 16^{2}	Runners-up	8	4	3	1	16	10	+6	50.00
2019 Copa Libertadores	5 March 2019	9 May 2019	Group stage	Round of 16^{3}	6	3	2	1	11	6	+5	50.00
Total					51	28	15	8	85	39	+46	54.90

Last updated: June 3, 2019.
Source: Competitions

1: The Round of 32 will be played in the next season. 2: The group stage was played the previous season. 3: The final stages are played in the next season.

=== Primera División ===
==== League table ====
Pos	Team	Pld	W	D	L	GF	GA	GD	Pts	Qualification
1	Racing (C)	25	17	6	2	43	16	+27	57	Qualification for Copa Libertadores group stage
2	Defensa y Justicia	25	15	8	2	33	18	+15	53	Qualification for Copa Libertadores group stage
3	Boca Juniors	25	15	6	4	42	18	+24	51	Qualification for Copa Libertadores group stage
4	River Plate	25	13	6	6	42	21	+21	45	Qualification for Copa Libertadores group stage (Note: River Plate qualified for the Copa Libertadores group stage by winning the 2018–19 Copa Argentina.)
5	Atlético Tucumán	25	12	6	7	36	29	+7	42	Qualification for Copa Libertadores second stage

Source: AFA
Rules for classification: 1) points; 2) play-off (only if needed to decide championship); 3) goal difference; 4) goals scored; 5) head-to-head points; 6) head-to-head goal difference; 7) head-to-head goals scored.
(C) Champions

==== Relegation table ====
Pos	Team	2016–17 Pts	2017–18 Pts	2018–19 Pts	Total Pts	Total Pld	Avg	Relegation
1	Boca Juniors	63	58	51	172	82	2.098	
2	Racing	55	45	57	157	82	1.915	
3	Defensa y Justicia	49	44	53	146	82	1.78	

==== Results summary ====
Overall								Home						Away					
Pld	W	D	L	GF	GA	GD	Pts	W	D	L	GF	GA	GD	W	D	L	GF	GA	GD
25	15	6	4	42	18	+24	51	9	1	2	22	7	+15	6	5	2	20	11	+9

Source: AFA

==== Results by round ====
Round	1	2	3	4	5	6	7	8	9	10	11	12	13	14	15	16	17	18	19	20	21	22	23	24	25
Ground	H	A	A	H	A	H	H	A	H	A	H	A	H	A	H	A	H	A	H	A	A	H	A	H	A
Result	W	L	D	W	W	L	W	D	D	L	W	W	W	W	L	D	W	D	W	W	W	W	W	W	D
Position	2	11	12	4	3	6	5	6	5	9	8	6	6	5	6	5	3	3	3	3	3	3	3	3	3

Source: AFA
A = Away; H = Home; W = Win; D = Draw; L = Loss

==== Matches ====
Win Draw Loss Postponed

12 August 2018 1	Boca Juniors	1–0	Talleres (C)	Buenos Aires
11:00 UTC−3	Pavón 8'; Pérez (yellow card) 17'; Barrios (yellow card) 86'	Report	Medina (yellow card) 43'	Stadium: La Bombonera; Referee: Facundo Tello

20 August 2018 2	Estudiantes (LP)	2–0	Boca Juniors	Quilmes
15:30 UTC−3	Apaolaza (yellow card) 32'; Noguera 57'; Lugüercio (yellow card) 64'; Pellegrini 74' (yellow card) 90+4'	Report	Nández (yellow card) 24'; Goltz (yellow card) 32'; Barrios (yellow card) 49'; Pérez (yellow card) 77'; Zárate (yellow card) 82'	Stadium: Estadio Centenario; Referee: Diego Abal

26 August 2018 3	Huracán	0–0	Boca Juniors	Buenos Aires
20:00 UTC−3	Roa (yellow card) 21'; Chimino (yellow card) 64'; Chávez (yellow card) 89'	Report	Balerdi (yellow card) 14'	Stadium: Tomás Adolfo Ducó; Referee: Germán Delfino

2 September 2018 4	Boca Juniors	3–0	Vélez Sarsfield	Buenos Aires
20:00 UTC−3	Pavón 28'; Cardona 39' (pen.); Nández (yellow card) 86'; Villa 90+1'	Report	Giménez (yellow card) 38'	Stadium: La Bombonera; Referee: Fernando Echenique

15 September 2018 5	Argentinos Juniors	0–1	Boca Juniors	Buenos Aires
20:00 UTC−3		Report	Izquierdoz 23'; Pérez (yellow card) 58'	Stadium: Diego Armando Maradona; Referee: Andrés Merlos

23 September 2018 6	Boca Juniors	0–2	River Plate	Buenos Aires
17:45 UTC−3	Barrios (yellow card) 19'; Cardona (yellow card) 43'; Almendra (yellow card) 64'; Nández (yellow card) 73'; Izquierdoz (yellow card) 76'	Report	Martínez 14'; Ponzio (yellow card) 40'; Maidana (yellow card) 60'; Scocco 68'	Stadium: La Bombonera; Referee: Mauro Vigliano

30 September 2018 7	Boca Juniors	3–1	Colón	Buenos Aires
20:00 UTC−3	Magallán 15' (yellow card) 24'; Peruzzi (yellow card) 18'; Zárate 32' (pen.); Chicco (yellow card) 71'; Tevez 79'; Pérez (yellow card) 87'	Report	Zuculini (yellow card) 52'; Bueno 86'	Stadium: La Bombonera; Referee: Germán Delfino

7 October 2018 8	Racing	2–2	Boca Juniors	Avellaneda
19:00 UTC−3	López 6', 65'; Zaracho (yellow card) 37' (yellow-red card) 83'; Sigali (yellow card) 42'; Mena (yellow card) 42'; Fernández (yellow card) 72'	Report	Almendra (yellow card) 12'; Magallán (yellow card) 72'; Nández (yellow card) 74'; Goltz (yellow card) 79'; Gago (yellow card) 79'; Ábila 81'; Villa 86'	Stadium: Presidente Juan Domingo Perón; Referee: Darío Herrera

20 October 2018 9	Boca Juniors	0–0	Rosario Central	Buenos Aires
17:45 UTC−3	Villa (yellow card) 26'; Mas (yellow card) 36'; Goltz (yellow card) 51'; Pérez (yellow card) 78'	Report	Ortigoza (yellow card) 24'; Gil (yellow card) 26'; Caruzzo (yellow card) 35'; Lovera (yellow card) 41'; Pereyra (yellow card) 78' (yellow-red card) 89'	Stadium: La Bombonera; Referee: Facundo Tello

27 October 2018 10	Gimnasia y Esgrima (LP)	2–1	Boca Juniors	La Plata
17:15 UTC−3	Faravelli 10'; Rinaudo (yellow card) 19'; Comba 48'; Bonifacio (yellow card) 86'	Report	Reynoso (yellow card) 18'; Mas (yellow card) 38'; Cardona (yellow card) 41'; Espinoza 44'; Goltz (yellow card) 45'; Gago (yellow card) 90+3'	Stadium: Juan Carmelo Zerillo; Referee: Jorge Baliño

3 November 2018 11	Boca Juniors	4–1	Tigre	Buenos Aires
20:00 UTC−3	Benedetto (yellow card) 41'; Tevez 25', 72'; Balerdi (yellow card) 52'; Gago (yellow card) 62'; Cardona 68'; Buffarini 87'	Report	González 10'; Ortiz (yellow card) 20'; Caire (yellow card) 28'	Stadium: La Bombonera; Referee: Germán Delfino

17 November 2018 13	Boca Juniors	1–0	Patronato	Buenos Aires
UTC−3	Buffarini (yellow card) 27'; Cardona (yellow card) 75'; Espinoza 81'; Retegui (yellow card) 90+2'	Report	Briñone (yellow card) 15'	Stadium: La Bombonera; Referee: Diego Abal

2 December 2018 14	Independiente	0–1	Boca Juniors	Buenos Aires
19:20 UTC−3	Meza (yellow card) 19'; Gigliotti (yellow card) 28'; Domingo (yellow card) 39'; G. Silva (yellow card) 39'	Report	Magallán (yellow card) 14' (yellow-red card) 60'; Chicco (yellow card) 41'; Buffarini (yellow card) 52'; Cardona 57'; Benedetto (yellow card) 62'	Stadium: Libertadores de América; Referee: Darío Herrera

27 January 2019 16	Newell's Old Boys	1–1	Boca Juniors	Rosario
21:30 UTC−3	Rodríguez 24' (yellow card) 26'; Rivero (yellow card) 68'	Report	Mas (yellow card) 63'; Benedetto 77'	Stadium: Marcelo Bielsa; Referee: Andrés Merlos

31 January 2019 12	San Martín (SJ)	0–4	Boca Juniors	San Juan
21:00 UTC−3	Dening (yellow card) 50'; Mosca (yellow card) 72'; Brandán (yellow card) 85'	Report	Campuzano (yellow card) 21'; Pavón 37'; Zárate 43'; Ábila 51'; Mas 77'; Mac Alister (yellow card) 88'; Marcone (yellow card) 90+1'	Stadium: Ingeniero Hilario Sánchez; Referee: Diego Abal
Note: Match postponed due to the participation of Boca in the finals of 2018 Copa Libertadores.

3 February 2019 17	Boca Juniors	2–0	Godoy Cruz	Buenos Aires
17:10 UTC−3	Benedetto 13' (pen.); Buffarini (yellow card) 54'; Zárate 90+2'	Report		Stadium: La Bombonera; Referee: Silvio Trucco

10 February 2019 18	Belgrano	1–1	Boca Juniors	Córdoba
21:30 UTC−3	Quiroga (yellow card) 29'; Patiño (yellow card) 62' (yellow-red card) 90+3'; Lértora 81'	Report	López 15'; Buffarini (yellow card) 37'; Alonso (yellow card) 57'; Izquierdoz (yellow card) 83'; Marcone (yellow card) 83'	Stadium: Julio César Villagra; Referee: Ariel Penel

17 February 2019 19	Boca Juniors	2–1	Lanús	Buenos Aires
19:20 UTC−3	Campuzano (yellow card) 42'; Mas 54'; Zárate 59'	Report	Belmonte (yellow card) 31'; Sand 58' (yellow card) 80'; Quignon (yellow card) 85'; Pasquini (yellow card) 90+3'	Stadium: La Bombonera; Referee: Patricio Loustau

20 February 2019 15	Boca Juniors	1–2	Atlético Tucumán	Buenos Aires
21:00 UTC−3	Tevez (yellow card) 9'; Nández (yellow card) 35'; Ábila 60'; Benedetto (yellow card) 75'	Report	Núñez 8' (yellow card) 50'; Abero (yellow card) 13'; Díaz (yellow card) 62'; Barbona 69' (yellow card) 89'; Aliendro (yellow card) 75'; San Román (yellow card) 75'; Leyes (yellow card) 81'	Stadium: La Bombonera; Referee: Germán Delfino
Note: Match postponed due to the participation of Boca in the finals of 2018 Copa Libertadores.

24 February 2019 20	Defensa y Justicia	0–1	Boca Juniors	Florencio Varela
21:30 UTC−3	Márquez (yellow card) 88'	Report	Zárate (yellow card) 16'; Tevez 49' (yellow card) 50'; Capaldo (yellow card) 83'; Benedetto (yellow card) 83'	Stadium: Norberto Tomaghello; Referee: Fernando Echenique

1 March 2019 21	Unión	1–3	Boca Juniors	Santa Fe
21:10 UTC−3	Martínez (yellow card) 12' (red card) 45+3'; Fragapane 18' (pen.); Acevedo (yellow card) 43'; Gómez Andrade (yellow card) 77'	Report	Nández (yellow card) 51'; Ábila 63'; Tevez 73'; López (yellow card) 80'; Mas (yellow card) 84'; Almendra 90+4'	Stadium: 15 de Abril; Referee: Andrés Merlos

9 March 2019 22	Boca Juniors	3–0	San Lorenzo	Buenos Aires
21:30 UTC−3	Zárate 4' (yellow card) 25'; Villa (yellow card) 53' (goal) 83'; Nández 64'; Ábila (yellow card) 70'; Buffarini (yellow card) 87'; Marcone (yellow card) 89'	Report	Pérez (yellow card) 2'; Poblete (yellow card) 15'; Salazar (yellow card) 47'; Peruzzi (yellow card) 59'; Monetti (red card) 70'; Castellani (yellow card) 87'; Blandi (yellow card) 90'; Rojas (yellow card) 90+1'	Stadium: La Bombonera; Referee: Facundo Tello

17 March 2019 23	San Martín (T)	1–4	Boca Juniors	San Miguel de Tucumán
20:00 UTC−3	Pons 26'; Acevedo (yellow card) 71'; Costa (yellow card) 90+2'	Report	Ábila 35' (yellow card) 71'; Marcone (yellow card) 56'; Reynoso 57'; López 68'; Nández 89'	Stadium: La Ciudadela; Referee: Mauro Vigliano

29 March 2019 24	Boca Juniors	2–0	Banfield	Buenos Aires
21:10 UTC−3	Ábila 17'; Marcone (yellow card) 56'; Pavón 56'	Report		Stadium: La Bombonera; Referee: Pablo Echavarría

6 April 2019 25	Aldosivi	1–1	Boca Juniors	Mar del Plata
20:00 UTC−3	Chávez 39'; Pisano (yellow card) 43'	Report	Zárate 12'; Obando (yellow card) 13'; Nández (yellow card) 58'	Stadium: José María Minella; Referee: Diego Abal

=== Copa de la Superliga ===
==== Round of 16 ====
28 April 2019 First Leg	Godoy Cruz	1–2	Boca Juniors	Mendoza
20:00 UTC−3	Merentiel 61'; Cardona (yellow card) 72'; Gutiérrez (yellow card) 86'; Bernardello (yellow card) 89'	Report	Alonso (yellow card) 17'; Pavón 31'; Reynoso (yellow card) 72'; Nández (yellow card) 85'; Mas 87'; Ábila (yellow card) 88'; Weigandt (yellow card) 90'	Stadium: Malvinas Argentinas; Referee: Silvio Trucco

5 May 2019 Second Leg	Boca Juniors	3–1 (5–2 agg.)	Godoy Cruz	Buenos Aires
20:00 UTC−3	Ábila 5', 54'; Almendra (yellow card) 26'; Izquierdoz (yellow card) 40'; Weigandt (yellow card) 46'; Zárate 87'	Report	Viera (yellow card) 11'; Cardona (yellow card) 26'; Merentiel (yellow card) 31'; Manzur (yellow card) 26'; Prieto 79'; Ramis (yellow card) 83'	Stadium: La Bombonera; Referee: Facundo Tello

==== Quarterfinals ====
12 May 2019 First Leg	Vélez Sarsfield	0–0	Boca Juniors	Buenos Aires
20:00 UTC−3	Vargas (yellow card) 26'; Almada (yellow card) 48'	Report	Pavón (yellow card) 29'; Ábila (yellow card) 33'; Zárate (yellow card) 49'; Marcone (yellow card) 86'	Stadium: José Amalfitani; Referee: Diego Abal

15 May 2019 Second Leg	Boca Juniors	0–0 (0–0 agg.) (5–4 p)	Vélez Sarsfield	Buenos Aires
21:10 UTC−3	Alonso (yellow card) 22'; Izquierdoz (red card) 80'	Report	Giménez (yellow card) 24'; Domínguez (yellow card) 35'; Laso (yellow card) 43'; Abram (yellow card) 83'	Stadium: La Bombonera
	Penalties
	Benedetto (penalty scored); Pavón (penalty scored); Zárate (penalty scored); Fabra (penalty scored); Buffarini (penalty scored)		(penalty scored) Giménez; (penalty missed) Cufré; (penalty scored) Salinas; (penalty scored) Almada; (penalty scored) L. Fernández

==== Semifinals ====
19 May 2019 First Leg	Argentinos Juniors	0–0	Boca Juniors	Buenos Aires
18:45 UTC−3	Sandoval (yellow card) 72'	Report	Nández (yellow card) 74'	Stadium: Diego Armando Maradona; Referee: Mauro Vigliano

26 May 2019 Second Leg	Boca Juniors	1–0 (1–0 agg.)	Argentinos Juniors	Buenos Aires
18:45 UTC−3	López 54' (yellow card) 66'; Marcone (red card) 76'; Nández (yellow card) 78'	Report	Romero (yellow card) 38' (yellow-red card) 52'; Spinelli (yellow card) 46'; Bobadilla (yellow card) 82'; Torrén (yellow card) 88'; Gómez (yellow card) 90+4'	Stadium: La Bombonera; Referee: Facundo Tello

==== Final ====
2 June 2019	Tigre	2–0	Boca Juniors	Córdoba
18:45 UTC−3	González 23'; Janson 31' (pen.); Prediger (yellow card) 35'; Menossi (yellow card) 48'; Alcoba (yellow card) 49'	Report	Tevez (yellow card) 11'; Izquierdoz (yellow card) 31'; Capaldo (yellow card) 53'; Campuzano (yellow card) 81'	Stadium: Mario Alberto Kempes; Referee: Néstor Pitana

=== 2017–18 Copa Argentina ===
==== Round of 64 ====
1 August 2018	Boca Juniors	6–0	Alvarado	Lanús
19:10 UTC−3	Magallán 4'; Ábila 24'; Pérez 28', 34'; Goltz 55'; Tevez 86' (pen.)	Report	Mantía (yellow card) 36'	Stadium: Ciudad de Lanús; Referee: Darío Herrera

==== Round of 32 ====
7 September 2018	Boca Juniors	2–0	San Martín (T)	Formosa
18:00 UTC−3	Pérez (yellow card) 41'; Cardona 75'; Ábila 90' (pen.)	Report	Rodríguez (yellow card) 52'; Arregui (red card) 87'; García (yellow card) 88'	Stadium: Estadio Antonio Romero; Referee: Silvio Trucco

==== Round of 16 ====
27 September 2018	Boca Juniors	0–1	Gimnasia y Esgrima (LP)	Córdoba
21:10 UTC−3	Izquierdoz (yellow card) 30'; Zárate (yellow card) 69'	Report	Rinaudo (yellow card) 56'; Licht (yellow card) 86'; Hurtado 89'	Stadium: Mario Alberto Kempes; Referee: Pablo Echavarría

=== 2018–19 Copa Argentina ===
==== Round of 64 ====
19 April 2019	Boca Juniors	2–0	Estudiantes (RC)	Mar del Plata
UTC−3	Ábila 18' (yellow card) 47'; Almendra (yellow card) 27'; López (yellow card) 34'; Zárate 44'; Marcone (yellow card) 50'; Alonso (yellow card) 71'	Report	Ferreira (yellow card) 39' (yellow-red card) 48'; Vester (yellow card) 72' (yellow-red card) 80'	Stadium: José María Minella; Referee: Pablo Dóvalo

=== Supercopa Argentina ===
2 May 2019	Boca Juniors	0–0 (6–5 p)	Rosario Central	Mendoza
21:10 UTC−3	Buffarini (yellow card) 18'; Reynoso (yellow card) 41'; Izquierdoz (yellow card) 45'; Villa (yellow card) 90'	Report	Almada (yellow card) 66'; Barbieri (yellow card) 69'; Pereyra (yellow card) 81'; Parot (yellow card) 88'	Stadium: Estadio Malvinas Argentinas; Referee: Fernando Rapallini
	Penalties
	Benedetto (penalty scored); Tevez (penalty scored); Pavón (penalty scored); Villa (penalty scored); Buffarini (penalty scored); Izquierdoz (penalty scored)		(penalty scored) Ortigoza; (penalty scored) Gil; (penalty scored) Parot; (penalty scored) Zampedri; (penalty scored) Caruzzo; (penalty missed) Rinaudo

=== 2018 Copa Libertadores ===
==== Final Stages ====
===== Round of 16 =====
8 August 2018 First leg	Boca Juniors (Argentina)	2–0	(Paraguay) Libertad	Buenos Aires, Argentina
19:30 UTC−3	Ábila 24'; Pavón (yellow card) 30'; Zárate 55'; Mas (yellow card) 88'	Report		Stadium: La Bombonera; Referee: Wilton Sampaio (Brazil)

30 August 2018 Second leg	Libertad (Paraguay)	2–4 (2–6 agg.)	(Argentina) Boca Juniors	Asunción, Paraguay
18:30 UTC−4	Cardozo 11', 38' (pen.); Arévalo Ríos (yellow card) 41'; Leiva (yellow card) 65'	Report	Pavón 18'; Zárate 21'; Jara (yellow card) 37'; Andrada (yellow card) 60'; Tevez 74'; Cardona 79' (pen.)	Stadium: Estadio Defensores del Chaco; Referee: Wilmar Roldán (Colombia)

===== Quarterfinals =====
19 September 2018 First leg	Boca Juniors (Argentina)	2–0	(Brazil) Cruzeiro	Buenos Aires, Argentina
21:45 UTC−3	Zárate 35'; Olaza (yellow card) 41'; Pérez 81'; Nández (yellow card) 89'	Report	Dedé (red card) 74'; Edílson (yellow card) 90+1'	Stadium: La Bombonera; Referee: Éber Aquino (Paraguay)

4 October 2018 Second leg	Cruzeiro (Brazil)	1–1 (1–3 agg.)	(Argentina) Boca Juniors	Belo Horizonte, Brazil
21:45 UTC−3	Egídio (yellow card) 35'; Dedé (yellow card) 50' (yellow-red card) 80'; Sassá 57'; Rafael (yellow card) 77'	Report	Pérez (yellow card) 21'; Pavón (yellow card) 77' (goal) 90+3'; Nández (yellow card) 90+5'	Stadium: Estádio Mineirão; Referee: Andrés Cunha (Uruguay)

===== Semifinals =====
24 October 2018 First leg	Boca Juniors (Argentina)	2–0	(Brazil) Palmeiras	Buenos Aires, Argentina
21:45 UTC−3	Zárate (yellow card) 22'; Olaza (yellow card) 28'; Villa (yellow card) 62'; Benedetto 83', 87'	Report	Bruno Henrique (yellow card) 21'; Gómez (yellow card) 29'	Stadium: La Bombonera; Referee: Roberto Tobar (Chile)

31 October 2018 Second leg	Palmeiras (Brazil)	2–2 (2–4 agg.)	(Argentina) Boca Juniors	São Paulo, Brazil
21:45 UTC−3	Felipe Melo (yellow card) 26'; Luan (yellow card) 41' (goal) 52'; Gómez 60' (pen.) (yellow card) 75'; Deyverson (yellow card) 90+3'	Report	Ábila 17' (yellow card) 56'; Pérez (yellow card) 67'; Benedetto 69'	Stadium: Allianz Parque; Referee: Wilmar Roldán (Colombia)

===== Finals =====
11 November 2018 First leg	Boca Juniors (Argentina)	2–2	(Argentina) River Plate	Buenos Aires, Argentina
21:45 UTC−3	Ábila 33' (yellow card) 47'; Villa (yellow card) 42'; Benedetto 45'; Tevez (yellow card) 90+4'	Report	Pratto 35'; Izquierdoz 61' (o.g.); Casco (yellow card) 66'; Santos Borré (yellow card) 75'	Stadium: La Bombonera; Referee: Roberto Tobar (Chile)
Note: The match was scheduled on November 10, was postponed to the following day due to a waterlogged pitch.

9 December 2018 (Note: The River Plate v Boca Juniors match, originally scheduled on 24 November 2018, 17:00 UTC−3, was postponed to 9 December 2018 due to an attack on the Boca Juniors team bus when several players were injured.) Second leg	River Plate (Argentina)	3–1 (a.e.t.) (3–5 agg.)	(Argentina) Boca Juniors	Madrid, Spain (Note: The River Plate v Boca Juniors match, originally scheduled to be hosted by River Plate at the Estadio Monumental Antonio Vespucio Liberti, Buenos Aires, will take place in Spain at the Santiago Bernabéu, Madrid due to safety concerns.)
21:45 UTC−3	Ponzio (yellow card) 27'; Pratto 67'; Fernández (yellow card) 80'; Maidana (yellow card) 82'; Quintero 108'; Casco (yellow card) 120'; Martínez 120+1'	Report	Pérez (yellow card) 42'; Benedetto 43'; Barrios (yellow card) 86' (yellow-red card) 91'; Tevez (yellow card) 120'	Stadium: Santiago Bernabéu; Referee: Andrés Cunha (Uruguay)

=== 2019 Copa Libertadores ===
==== Group stage ====
Pos	Team	Pld	W	D	L	GF	GA	GD	Pts	Qualification	BOC	CAP	TOL	WIL
1	(Argentina) Boca Juniors	6	3	2	1	11	6	+5	11	Round of 16	—	2–1	3–0	4–0
2	(Brazil) Athletico Paranaense	6	3	0	3	11	6	+5	9	Round of 16	3–0	—	1–0	4–0
3	(Colombia) Deportes Tolima	6	2	2	2	7	8	−1	8	Copa Sudamericana	2–2	1–0	—	2–2
4	(Bolivia) Jorge Wilstermann	6	1	2	3	5	14	−9	5		0–0	3–2	0–2	—

Source: CONMEBOL

March 5, 2019 1	Jorge Wilstermann (Bolivia)	0–0	(Argentina) Boca Juniors	Cochabamba, Bolivia
20:30 UTC−4	Ortiz (yellow card) 51'	Report		Stadium: Estadio Félix Capriles; Referee: Julio Bascuñán (Chile)

March 12, 2019 2	Boca Juniors (Argentina)	3–0	(Colombia) Deportes Tolima	Buenos Aires, Argentina
19:15 UTC−3	Izquierdoz (yellow card) 28'; Marcone (yellow card) 44'; Pérez 47' (o.g.); Benedetto 55' (yellow card) 79'; Zárate 59'; Reynoso (yellow card) 80'	Report	Arboleda (yellow card) 46'; Quiñones (yellow card) 62'; Pérez (yellow card) 72'; Banguero (yellow card) 77'; Vásquez (yellow card) 77'; Robles (red card) 90'; Vargas (yellow card) 90+2'	Stadium: La Bombonera; Referee: Esteban Ostojich (Uruguay)

April 2, 2019 3	Athletico Paranaense (Brazil)	3–0	(Argentina) Boca Juniors	Curitiba, Brazil
21:30 UTC−3	Ruben 35', 68', 80' (yellow card) 44'	Report	Tevez (yellow card) 40'; Marcone (yellow card) 54'; Nández (yellow card) 85'	Stadium: Arena da Baixada; Referee: Roberto Tobar (Chile)

April 10, 2019 4	Boca Juniors (Argentina)	4–0	(Bolivia) Jorge Wilstermann	Buenos Aires, Argentina
21:30 UTC−3	Benedetto (penalty missed) 31' 62' (pen.); Reynoso 35'; Villa (yellow card) 59'; Zárate 84', 94'; Izquierdoz (yellow card) 86'	Report	Serginho (yellow card) 30'; Núñez (yellow card) 33'; Ortiz (yellow card) 48'; Alex Silva (yellow card) 49'; Chávez (yellow card) 79'	Stadium: La Bombonera; Referee: Diego Haro (Peru)

April 24, 2019 5	Deportes Tolima (Colombia)	2–2	(Argentina) Boca Juniors	Ibagué, Colombia
19:30 UTC−5	Castro 12'; Pérez 20'; Mosquera (yellow card) 42'; Arboleda (yellow card) 66'; Quiñones (yellow card) 81'; Gordillo (yellow card) 85'	Report	Zárate 34' (yellow card) 55'; Benedetto 43' (pen.) (yellow card) 53'	Stadium: Estadio Manuel Murillo Toro; Referee: Víctor Carrillo (Peru)

May 9, 2019 6	Boca Juniors (Argentina)	2–1	(Brazil) Athletico Paranaense	Buenos Aires, Argentina
21:30 UTC−3	Mas (yellow card) 33'; Izquierdoz (yellow card) 35'; López 71'; Nández (yellow card) 78'; Tevez 90+4'	Report	Nikão (yellow card) 33'; Léo Cittadini (yellow card) 63'; Ruben 65'; Santos (yellow card) 75'; Robles (red card) 79'	Stadium: La Bombonera; Referee: Carlos Orbe (Ecuador)

== Team statistics ==
	Total	Home	Away	Neutral
Games played	51	22	22	7
Games won	28	17	8	3
Games drawn	15	3	11	1
Games lost	8	2	3	3
Biggest win	6-0 vs Alvarado	4-0 vs Jorge Wilstermann	4-0 vs San Martín (SJ)	6-0 vs Alvarado
Biggest loss	0-3 vs Athletico Paranaense	1-2 vs Atlético Tucumán	0-3 vs Athletico Paranaense	0-1 vs Gimnasia y Esgrima (LP)
Biggest win (Primera División)	4-0 vs San Martín (SJ)	3-0 vs Vélez Sarsfield	4-0 vs San Martín (SJ)	None
Biggest win (Copa de la Superliga)	3-1 vs Godoy Cruz	3-1 vs Godoy Cruz	2-1 vs Godoy Cruz	None
Biggest win (Copa Argentina)	6-0 vs Alvarado	None		6-0 vs Alvarado
Biggest win (Supercopa Argentina)	None			
Biggest win (Copa Libertadores)	4-0 vs Jorge Wilstermann	4-0 vs Jorge Wilstermann	4-2 vs Libertad	None
Biggest loss (Primera División)	2-0 vs Estudiantes (LP)		2-0 vs Estudiantes (LP)	None
Biggest loss (Copa de la Superliga)	2-0 vs Tigre	None		2-0 vs Tigre
Biggest loss (Copa Argentina)	0-1 vs Gimnasia y Esgrima (LP)	None		0-1 vs Gimnasia y Esgrima (LP)
Biggest loss (Supercopa Argentina)	None			
Biggest loss (Copa Libertadores)	0-3 vs Athletico Paranaense		0-3 vs Athletico Paranaense	
Clean sheets	26	14	8	4
Goals scored	85	43	31	11
Goals conceded	39	11	22	6
Goal difference	+46	+32	+9	+5
Yellow cards	138	60	62	16
Red cards	4	2	1	1
Top scorer	Zárate (15)	Zárate (10)	Ábila (5)	Ábila (3)
Worst discipline	Magallán; Izquierdoz; Barrios; Marcone (1 RC)	Izquierdoz; Marcone (1 RC)	Magallán (1 RC)	Barrios (1 RC)
Penalties for	10	6	2	2
Penalties against	2		2	

=== Season Appearances and goals ===
As of June 3, 2019

No.	Pos	Nat	Player	Total		Primera División		Copa de la Superliga		Copa Argentina		Supercopa Argentina		Copa Libertadores	
No.	Pos	Nat	Player	Apps	Goals	Apps	Goals	Apps	Goals	Apps	Goals	Apps	Goals	Apps	Goals
Goalkeepers
12	GK	(Argentina) ARG	Marcos Díaz	2	-1	1	-1	0	0	1	0	0	0	0	0
28	GK	(Argentina) ARG	Manuel Roffo	0	0	0	0	0	0	0	0	0	0	0	0
31	GK	(Argentina) ARG	Esteban Andrada	37	-24	18	-9	7	-4	1	0	1	0	10	-11
Defenders
2	DF	(Argentina) ARG	Paolo Goltz	14	1	9+1	0	0	0	2	1	0	0	2	0
3	DF	(Argentina) ARG	Emmanuel Mas	36	3	17+2	2	6	1	2	0	1	0	8	0
4	DF	(Argentina) ARG	Julio Buffarini	34	1	17	1	5	0	1	0	1	0	8+2	0
6	DF	(Paraguay) PAR	Júnior Alonso	13	0	7	0	4+1	0	1	0	0	0	0	0
13	DF	(Argentina) ARG	Kevin Mac Allister	2	0	1+1	0	0	0	0	0	0	0	0	0
18	DF	(Colombia) COL	Frank Fabra	4	0	1	0	1+1	0	1	0	0	0	0	0
20	DF	(Argentina) ARG	Lisandro López	21	4	8	2	5	1	1	0	1	0	6	1
24	DF	(Argentina) ARG	Carlos Izquierdoz	38	1	17+1	1	6	0	1	0	1	0	12	0
42	DF	(Argentina) ARG	Marcelo Weigandt	3	0	0	0	2	0	1	0	0	0	0	0
Midfielders
15	MF	(Uruguay) URU	Nahitan Nández	35	2	10+2	2	4+2	0	0+2	0	1	0	12+2	0
23	MF	(Argentina) ARG	Iván Marcone	23	0	11	0	4	0	1	0	1	0	6	0
27	MF	(Colombia) COL	Jorman Campuzano	16	0	8+2	0	3+2	0	0	0	0	0	0+1	0
30	MF	(Argentina) ARG	Emanuel Reynoso	25	2	7+9	1	1+1	0	0+1	0	1	0	4+1	1
37	MF	(Argentina) ARG	Nicolás Capaldo	4	0	0+1	0	3	0	0	0	0	0	0	0
39	MF	(Argentina) ARG	Agustín Almendra	24	1	12+3	1	2	0	2	0	0	0	2+3	0
40	MF	(Argentina) ARG	Julián Chicco	5	0	3+2	0	0	0	0	0	0	0	0	0
Forwards
7	FW	(Argentina) ARG	Cristian Pavón	37	7	12+2	4	5+2	1	3	0	0+1	0	8+4	2
9	FW	(Argentina) ARG	Darío Benedetto	34	10	10+5	2	3+1	0	2	0	1	0	9+3	8
10	FW	(Argentina) ARG	Carlos Tevez	41	8	13+8	5	5+1	0	0+3	1	0+1	0	4+6	2
17	MF	(Argentina) ARG	Ramón Ábila	33	14	8+8	6	3+1	2	2+1	3	0	0	4+6	3
19	FW	(Argentina) ARG	Mauro Zárate	46	15	16+6	6	4+3	1	4	1	1	0	8+4	7
22	FW	(Colombia) COL	Sebastián Villa	38	3	10+7	3	2+4	0	0+3	0	1	0	9+2	0
27	MF	(Argentina) ARG	Brandon Cortés	2	0	0+1	0	0	0	0+1	0	0	0	0	0
34	MF	(Argentina) ARG	Agustín Obando	6	0	1	0	2+1	0	1	0	0	0	0+1	0
Players who have made an appearance or had a squad number this season, but have left the club
1	GK	(Argentina) ARG	Agustín Rossi	12	-14	6	-8	0	0	2	-1	0	0	4	-5
28	GK	(Bolivia) BOL	Carlos Lampe	0	0	0	0	0	0	0	0	0	0	0	0
6	DF	(Argentina) ARG	Lisandro Magallán	19	2	7+1	1	0	0	3	1	0	0	8	0
14	DF	(Argentina) ARG	Gino Peruzzi	3	0	3	0	0	0	0	0	0	0	0	0
20	DF	(Uruguay) URU	Lucas Olaza	11	0	4	0	0	0	1	0	0	0	6	0
21	DF	(Argentina) ARG	Agustín Heredia	0	0	0	0	0	0	0	0	0	0	0	0
26	DF	(Argentina) ARG	Leonardo Balerdi	5	0	5	0	0	0	0	0	0	0	0	0
5	MF	(Argentina) ARG	Fernando Gago	13	0	8	0	0	0	1	0	0	0	1+3	0
8	MF	(Argentina) ARG	Pablo Pérez	17	3	3+3	0	0	0	3	2	0	0	8	1
10	MF	(Colombia) COL	Edwin Cardona	17	5	7+4	3	0	0	3	1	0	0	1+2	1
16	MF	(Colombia) COL	Wílmar Barrios	16	0	6	0	0	0	2	0	0	0	8	0
29	MF	(Argentina) ARG	Leonardo Jara	13	0	4	0	0	0	2	0	0	0	6+1	0
33	MF	(Argentina) ARG	Gonzalo Lamardo	0	0	0	0	0	0	0	0	0	0	0	0
11	FW	(Argentina) ARG	Cristian Espinoza	5	2	3+1	2	0	0	0+1	0	0	0	0	0
38	FW	(Argentina) ARG	Mateo Retegui	1	0	0+1	0	0	0	0	0	0	0	0	0

=== Top scorers ===
As of June 3, 2019

Rank	Pos.	No.	Name	Primera División	Copa de la Superliga	Copa Argentina	Supercopa Argentina	Copa Libertadores	Total
1	FW	19	(Argentina) Mauro Zárate	6	1	1	—	7	15
2	FW	17	(Argentina) Ramón Ábila	6	2	3	—	3	14
3	FW	9	(Argentina) Darío Benedetto	2			—	8	10
4	FW	32	(Argentina) Carlos Tevez	5		1	—	2	8
5	FW	7	(Argentina) Cristian Pavón	4	1		—	2	7
6	MF	10	(Colombia) Edwin Cardona	3		1	—	1	5
7	DF	20	(Argentina) Lisandro López	2	1		—	1	4
8	FW	22	(Colombia) Sebastián Villa	3			—		3
9	MF	8	(Argentina) Pablo Pérez			2	—	1	3
10	DF	3	(Argentina) Emmanuel Mas	2	1		—		3
11	DF	6	(Argentina) Lisandro Magallán	1		1	—		2
12	MF	15	(Uruguay) Nahitan Nández	2			—		2
13	FW	11	(Argentina) Cristian Espinoza	2			—		2
14	MF	30	(Argentina) Emanuel Reynoso	1			—	1	2
15	DF	2	(Argentina) Paolo Goltz			1	—		1
16	DF	24	(Argentina) Carlos Izquierdoz	1			—		1
17	DF	4	(Argentina) Julio Buffarini	1			—		1
18	MF	39	(Argentina) Agustín Almendra	1			—		1
Own goals							—	1	1
Total				42	6	10	—	27	85

=== Top assists ===
As of June 3, 2019

Rank	Pos.	No.	Name	Primera División	Copa de la Superliga	Copa Argentina	Supercopa Argentina	Copa Libertadores	Total
1	FW	19	(Argentina) Mauro Zárate	7	1		—	1	9
6	FW	7	(Argentina) Cristian Pavón	3	1	1	—	1	6
3	FW	17	(Argentina) Ramón Ábila	4			—	1	5
4	FW	22	(Colombia) Sebastián Villa	2			—	3	5
5	FW	9	(Argentina) Darío Benedetto	1			—	3	4
6	FW	32	(Argentina) Carlos Tevez	1		1	—	1	3
7	DF	3	(Argentina) Emmanuel Mas	1		1	—	1	3
8	MF	15	(Uruguay) Nahitan Nández	1			—	2	3
9	MF	30	(Argentina) Emanuel Reynoso	2			—		2
10	DF	4	(Argentina) Julio Buffarini	1			—	1	2
11	FW	34	(Argentina) Agustín Obando		1	1	—		2
12	MF	8	(Argentina) Pablo Pérez				—	2	2
13	DF	2	(Argentina) Paolo Goltz	1		1	—		2
14	MF	39	(Argentina) Agustín Almendra		1		—		1
15	MF	10	(Colombia) Edwin Cardona	1			—		1
16	FW	11	(Argentina) Cristian Espinoza	1			—		1
17	DF	6	(Paraguay) Júnior Alonso	1			—		1
Total				27	4	4	—	16	51

=== Penalties ===
Date	Penalty Taker	Scored	Opponent	Competition
August 1, 2018	Carlos Tevez	Yes	Alvarado	Copa Argentina
August 12, 2018	Carlos Tevez	No	Talleres (C)	Primera División
August 30, 2018	Edwin Cardona	Yes	Libertad	Copa Libertadores
September 2, 2018	Edwin Cardona	Yes	Vélez Sarsfield	Primera División
September 7, 2018	Ramón Ábila	Yes	San Martín (T)	Copa Argentina
September 30, 2018	Mauro Zárate	Yes	Colón	Primera División
February 3, 2019	Darío Benedetto	Yes	Godoy Cruz	Primera División
April 10, 2019	Darío Benedetto	No	Jorge Wilstermann	Copa Libertadores
April 10, 2019	Darío Benedetto	Yes	Jorge Wilstermann	Copa Libertadores
April 24, 2019	Darío Benedetto	Yes	Deportes Tolima	Copa Libertadores

=== Clean sheets ===
As of June 3, 2019

Rank	Pos.	No.	Name	Primera División	Copa de la Superliga	Copa Argentina	Supercopa Argentina	Copa Libertadores	Total
1	GK	31	(Argentina) Esteban Andrada	11	4	1	1	5	22
2	GK	1	(Argentina) Agustín Rossi	1		1		1	3
3	GK	12	(Argentina) Marcos Díaz			1			1
Total				12	4	3	1	6	26

=== Disciplinary record ===
As of June 3, 2019

No.	Pos	Nat	Name	Primera División			Copa de la Superliga			Copa Argentina			Supercopa Argentina			Copa Libertadores			Total		
No.	Pos	Nat	Name	Booked	(yellow card) (yellow-red card)	Sent off (straight red)	Booked	(yellow card) (yellow-red card)	Sent off (straight red)	Booked	(yellow card) (yellow-red card)	Sent off (straight red)	Booked	(yellow card) (yellow-red card)	Sent off (straight red)	Booked	(yellow card) (yellow-red card)	Sent off (straight red)	Booked	(yellow card) (yellow-red card)	Sent off (straight red)
Goalkeepers
12	GK	(Argentina)	Marcos Díaz																		
28	GK	(Argentina)	Manuel Roffo																		
31	GK	(Argentina)	Esteban Andrada													1			1		
Defenders
2	DF	(Argentina)	Paolo Goltz	4															4		
3	DF	(Argentina)	Emmanuel Mas	4												3			7		
4	DF	(Argentina)	Julio Buffarini	5									1						6		
6	DF	(Paraguay)	Júnior Alonso	1			2			1									4		
13	DF	(Argentina)	Kevin Mac Allister	1															1		
18	DF	(Colombia)	Frank Fabra																		
20	DF	(Argentina)	Lisandro López	1			1			1									3		
24	DF	(Argentina)	Carlos Izquierdoz	2			2		1	1			1			3			9		1
42	DF	(Argentina)	Marcelo Weigandt				2												2		
Midfielders
15	MF	(Uruguay)	Nahitan Nández	7			3									4			14		
23	MF	(Argentina)	Iván Marcone	5			1		1	1						2			9		1
27	MF	(Colombia)	Jorman Campuzano	2			1												3		
30	MF	(Argentina)	Emanuel Reynoso	1			1						1			1			4		
37	MF	(Argentina)	Nicolás Capaldo	1			1												2		
39	MF	(Argentina)	Agustín Almendra	2			1			1									4		
40	MF	(Argentina)	Julián Chicco	2															2		
Forwards
7	FW	(Argentina)	Cristian Pavón				1									2			3		
9	FW	(Argentina)	Darío Benedetto	3												2			5		
10	FW	(Argentina)	Carlos Tevez	2			1									3			6		
17	FW	(Argentina)	Ramón Ábila	2			2			1						2			7		
19	FW	(Argentina)	Mauro Zárate	3			1			1						2			7		
22	FW	(Colombia)	Sebastián Villa	2									1			3			6		
27	FW	(Argentina)	Brandon Cortés																		
34	FW	(Argentina)	Agustín Obando	1															1		
Players who have made an appearance or had a squad number this season, but have left the club
1	GK	(Argentina)	Agustín Rossi																		
28	GK	(Bolivia)	Carlos Lampe																		
6	DF	(Argentina)	Lisandro Magallán	2	1														2	1	
14	DF	(Argentina)	Gino Peruzzi	1															1		
20	DF	(Uruguay)	Lucas Olaza													2			2		
21	DF	(Argentina)	Agustín Heredia																		
26	DF	(Argentina)	Leonardo Balerdi	2															2		
5	MF	(Argentina)	Fernando Gago	3															3		
8	MF	(Argentina)	Pablo Pérez	5						1						3			9		
10	MF	(Colombia)	Edwin Cardona	3															3		
16	MF	(Colombia)	Wílmar Barrios	3													1		3	1	
29	MF	(Argentina)	Leonardo Jara													2			2		
33	MF	(Argentina)	Gonzalo Lamardo																		
11	FW	(Argentina)	Cristian Espinoza																		
38	FW	(Argentina)	Mateo Retegui	1															1		
Total				71	1		20		2	8			4			35	1		138	2	2
