= 2019 Copa de la Superliga Final =

Argentina football tournament final

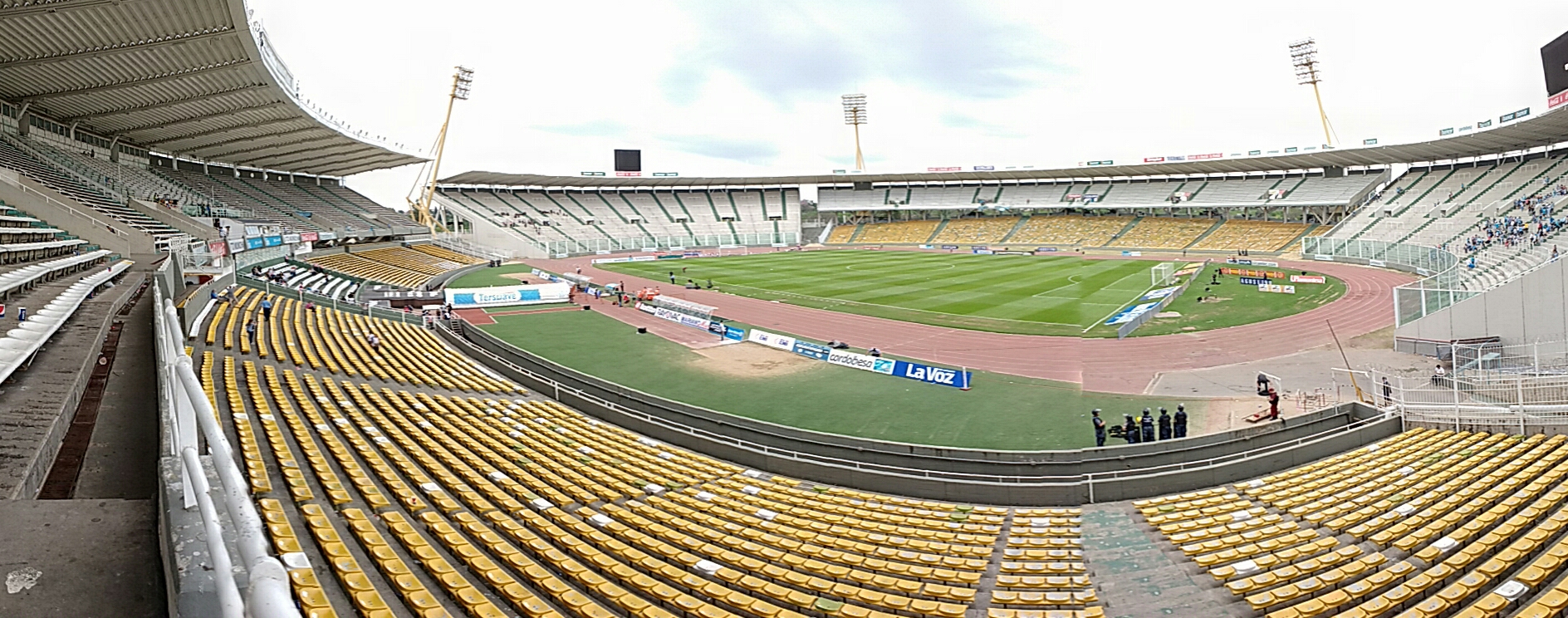
- Estadio Mario Kempes, venue
- Event: 2019 Copa de la Superliga
Tigre	Boca Juniors
2	0
- Date: 2 June 2019
- Venue: Estadio Mario Alberto Kempes, Córdoba
- Man of the Match: Gonzalo Marinelli (Tigre)
- Referee: Néstor Pitana

The 2019 Copa de la Superliga Final was the 49th and final match of the 2019 Copa de la Superliga. It was played on 2 June 2019 at the Estadio Mario Alberto Kempes in Córdoba between Tigre and Boca Juniors.

Tigre defeated Boca Juniors 2–0 to win their first Primera División title. As champions, Tigre qualified for the group stage of the 2020 Copa Libertadores. They also qualified for the 2019 Trofeo de Campeones de la Superliga Argentina.

The match had the peculiarity of having been won by a team (Tigre) that had been releagated to the second division two months prior to the match. It was also the first championship won by Tigre in the upper division of Argentine football.

As Boca Juniors and the semifinalist Atlético Tucumán had already qualified for the 2020 Copa Libertadores, the other semifinalist Argentinos Juniors won the 2020 Copa Sudamericana berth. Atlético Tucumán qualification allowed the qualification of Lanús for 2020 Copa Sudamericana.

== Qualified teams ==
Team	Previous app.
Tigre	None
Boca Juniors	None

=== Road to the final ===
Note: In all results below, the score of the finalist is given first (H: home; A: away).

Tigre				Round	Boca Juniors			
Opponent	Agg.	1st leg	2nd leg		Opponent	Agg.	1st leg	2nd leg
Colón	3–2	0–0 (A)	3–2 (H)	First round	Bye			
Unión	4–3	1–2 (H)	3–1 (A)	Round of 16	Godoy Cruz	5–2	2–1 (A)	3–1 (H)
Racing	3–2	2–0 (H)	1–2 (A)	Quarterfinals	Vélez Sarsfield	0–0 (5–4 p)	0–0 (A)	0–0 (H)
Atlético Tucumán	6–0	5–0 (H)	1–0 (A)	Semifinals	Argentinos Juniors	1–0	0–0 (A)	1–0 (H)

== Match ==
Iván Marcone and Nahitan Nández (Boca Juniors) both missed out on the final due to suspension.

=== Summary ===
The first half began with a physical and tight contest, a consequence of the intensity both teams brought to the game. Tigre opted for a high press, which forced Boca Juniors to bypass the midfield and link up their build-up play (generally from Carlos Izquierdoz) with one of their forwards dropping deep to hold up the ball with their back to goal.

However, in a couple of attacking moves, Tigre's pressing showed cracks in their defensive block. And, from quick transitions, Boca Juniors threatened twice. First, in the 15th minute, after a pass from Mauro Zárate, Darío Benedetto's shot hit the goalpost. Then, in the 17th minute, another shot by Sebastián Villa's was saved by goalkeeper Gonzalo Marinelli, sending the ball to a corner kick.

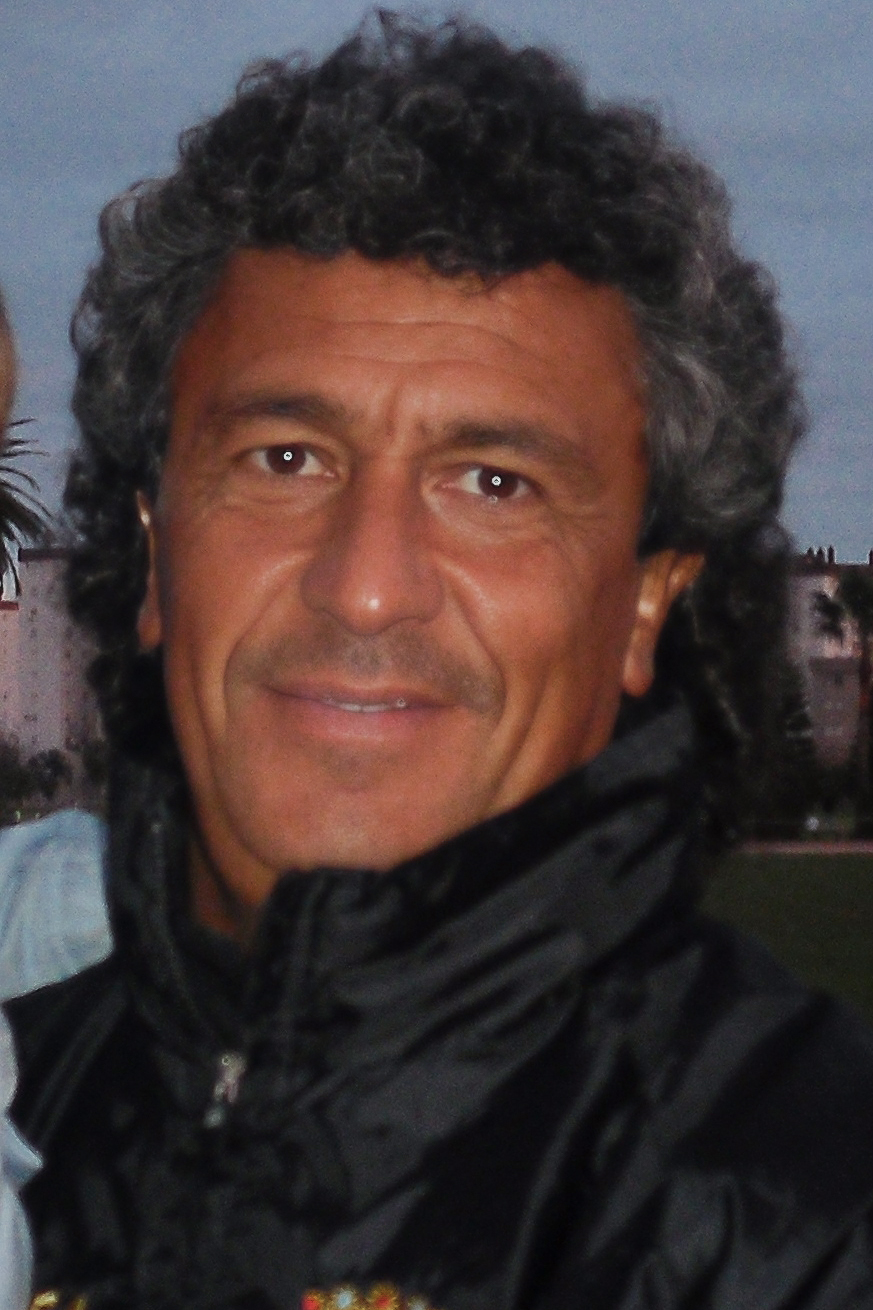
Néstor Gorosito, manager of Tigre, won his first title with the club

The team managed by Néstor Gorosito controlled possession without creating any real danger, while Boca Juniors chose to close their lines and wait to impose their attacking prowess. In the 23rd minute, Federico González dribbled and surprised everyone with a shot to the near post that slipped through Esteban Andrada's hands so Tigre took the 1–0 lead. Almost immediately came the second blow from the Matador team when Lucas Janson ran along (no offside position was signalled) and Carlos Izquierdoz grabbed him by the neck. Referee Néstor Pitana didn't hesitate and awarded a penalty kick. Janson himself, with a low shot set the 2–0 for Tigre. Boca Juniors had a chance to pull one back with a free kick by Mauro Zárate but he failed.

In the second half, Boca Juniors struggled to build attacks, mainly due to the lack of a playmaker capable of linking up play or threading passes between the lines. Carlos Tevez retrated into the field in search of more associated play with his teammates; however, he created more danger through individual moves. Tigre, on the other hand, focused on moving the ball around to wear down their opponents.

Boca Juniors manager Gustavo Alfaro opted to impose his will through sheer power and attacking prowess. Therefore, he sent two strikers to the field and modified the formation, using three at the back and wing-backs. With this plan, he managed to pin push Tigre aside. Boca Juniors had three clear chances, first, in the 18th minute, Darío Benedetto caught a long pass from the right and attempted a diving header that went just inches wide of Marinelli's left post. A minute later, he fired a shot from outside the penalty area, which the goalkeeper could save. And in the 31st minute, he rattled the crossbar with another header.

Despite Boca Juniors' attempts, Tigre resisted until the end of the match, claiming their first title in the upper division of Argentine football. According to the media, Tigre was a well-deserved winner.

=== Details ===
2 June 2019
18:45

Tigre	2–0	Boca Juniors
González 23'; Janson 31' (pen.)	Report

Estadio Mario Alberto Kempes, Córdoba
Referee: Néstor Pitana

Tigre	Boca Juniors

GK	23	(Argentina) Gonzalo Marinelli
DF	17	(Argentina) Matías Pérez Acuña
DF	19	(Uruguay) Gerardo Alcoba (c)	(yellow card) 49'
DF	3	(Argentina) Néstor Moiraghi
DF	16	(Argentina) Nicolás Colazo
MF	21	(Argentina) Sebastián Prediger	(yellow card) 35'
MF	5	(Argentina) Lucas Menossi	(yellow card) 48'
MF	10	(Argentina) Diego Alberto Morales		(substituted off) 59'
MF	14	(Argentina) Walter Montillo		(substituted off) 75'
MF	11	(Argentina) Lucas Janson		(substituted off) 61'
FW	9	(Argentina) Federico González
Substitutes:
GK	12	(Uruguay) Gastón Guruceaga
DF	2	(Argentina) Ezequiel Rodríguez
DF	6	(Argentina) Ignacio Canuto		(substituted on) 75'
MF	8	(Argentina) Martín Galmarini
MF	15	(Argentina) Juan Cavallaro		(substituted on) 61'
MF	22	(Argentina) Jorge Ortiz		(substituted on) 59'
FW	7	(Argentina) Carlos Luna
Manager:
(Argentina) Néstor Gorosito

GK	31	(Argentina) Esteban Andrada
DF	4	(Argentina) Julio Buffarini		(substituted off) 60'
DF	20	(Argentina) Lisandro López
DF	24	(Argentina) Carlos Izquierdoz	(yellow card) 31'
DF	3	(Argentina) Emmanuel Mas
MF	27	(Colombia) Jorman Campuzano	(yellow card) 81'
MF	37	(Argentina) Nicolás Capaldo	(yellow card) 53'	(substituted off) 71'
MF	22	(Colombia) Sebastián Villa		(substituted off) 60'
MF	10	(Argentina) Carlos Tevez (c)	(yellow card) 11'
MF	19	(Argentina) Mauro Zárate
FW	9	(Argentina) Darío Benedetto
Substitutes:
GK	12	(Argentina) Marcos Díaz
DF	6	(Paraguay) Júnior Alonso		(substituted on) 60'
DF	18	(Colombia) Frank Fabra
MF	40	(Argentina) Julián Chicco
FW	7	(Argentina) Cristian Pavón		(substituted on) 71'
FW	11	(Argentina) Agustín Obando
FW	17	(Argentina) Ramón Ábila		(substituted on) 60'
Manager:
(Argentina) Gustavo Alfaro

Man of the Match:
(Argentina) Gonzalo Marinelli (Tigre)

Assistant referees:
Hernán Maidana
Juan Pablo Belatti
Fourth official:
Ariel Penel

Match rules

- 90 minutes.
- 30 minutes of extra time if necessary.
- Penalty shoot-out if scores still level.
- Seven named substitutes.
- Maximum of three substitutions, with a fourth allowed in extra time.

=== Statistics ===
Overall
	Tigre	Boca Juniors
Goals scored	2	0
Total shots	5	13
Shots on target	4	5
Ball possession	37%	63%
Corner kicks	3	13
Fouls committed	18	13
Offsides	2	2
Yellow cards	3	4
Red cards	0	0

2019 Copa de la Superliga winners
Tigre
1st Title
