= Brandon Cortés =

Argentine-Chilean footballer (born 2001)

Personal information
- Full name: Brandon William Cortés Bustos
- Date of birth: 26 June 2001 (age 25)
- Place of birth: Barracas, Argentina
- Height: 1.78 m (5 ft 10 in)
- Position: Attacking midfielder

Team information
- Current team: Patronato (on loan from Boca Juniors)

Youth career
- Juventud Unida de Barracas
- Vélez Sarsfield
- 2012–2019: Boca Juniors

Senior career*
Years	Team	Apps	(Gls)
2019–	Boca Juniors	4	(0)
2020–2021	→ Universidad de Chile (loan)	16	(0)
2024	→ Central Córdoba SdE (loan)	0	(0)
2024–2025	→ Nueva Chicago (loan)	23	(1)
2026–	→ Patronato (loan)	4	(0)

International career^{‡}
2019	Argentina U18	1	(1)
- * Club domestic league appearances and goals as of 18:01, 23 March 2026 (UTC) ‡ National team caps and goals as of 18:26, 28 December 2020 (UTC)

Brandon William Cortés Bustos (born 26 June 2001) is an Argentine-Chilean professional footballer who plays as an attacking midfielder for Patronato, on loan from Boca Juniors.

== Club career ==
Cortés is a product of the Boca Juniors youth set-up; signing in 2012 after spells with Juventud Unida de Barracas and Vélez Sarsfield. He was moved into the first-team by manager Gustavo Alfaro in 2018–19, with his first experience of senior football arriving on 2 April 2019 as he was an unused substitute in the Copa Libertadores against Athletico Paranaense. Cortés, who is of Chilean descent, subsequently made his professional bow days later, aged seventeen, in an away draw versus Aldosivi in the Primera División; he was substituted on in place of Sebastián Villa after eighty-three minutes.

After one further match for Boca, versus Río Cuarto's Estudiantes in the Copa Argentina, Cortés departed on loan in November 2020 to Universidad de Chile; penning terms until December 2021. He immediately made appearances later that month against Santiago Wanderers, Unión La Calera and Everton in the Primera División.

In the first half of 2024, Cortés was loaned out to Central Córdoba de Santiago del Estero. In the second half of the same year, he was loaned out to Nueva Chicago on a deal until December 2025 with an option to buy. In 2026, he switched to Patronato.

== International career ==
Cortés, who is eligible to play for Chile or Argentina, trained with the Chile U17s ahead of the 2017 FIFA World Cup, though didn't make the final cut due to paperwork issues. In July 2019, Cortés was called up by the Argentina U18s for that year's L'Alcúdia International Tournament in Spain. Argentina beat Mauritania in match one, with Cortés netting a goal in a 4–1 win.

In January 2023, Cortés was called up to a training microcycle of Chile U23 under Eduardo Berizzo.

== Personal life ==
Cortés was born in Argentina to Chilean parents. He holds dual Argentine-Chilean nationality.

== Career statistics ==
As of 28 December 2020.

Appearances and goals by club, season and competition
Club	Season	League			Cup		League Cup		Continental		Other		Total	
Club	Season	Division	Apps	Goals	Apps	Goals	Apps	Goals	Apps	Goals	Apps	Goals	Apps	Goals
Boca Juniors	2018–19	Argentine Primera División	1	0	1	0	0	0	0	0	0	0	2	0
Boca Juniors	2019–20	Argentine Primera División	0	0	0	0	0	0	0	0	0	0	0	0
Boca Juniors	2020–21	Argentine Primera División	0	0	0	0	0	0	0	0	0	0	0	0
Boca Juniors	Total		1	0	1	0	0	0	0	0	0	0	2	0
Universidad de Chile (loan)	2020	Chilean Primera División	4	0	0	0	—		0	0	0	0	4	0
Career total			5	0	1	0	0	0	0	0	0	0	6	0
