= Nicolás Capaldo =

Argentine footballer (born 1998)

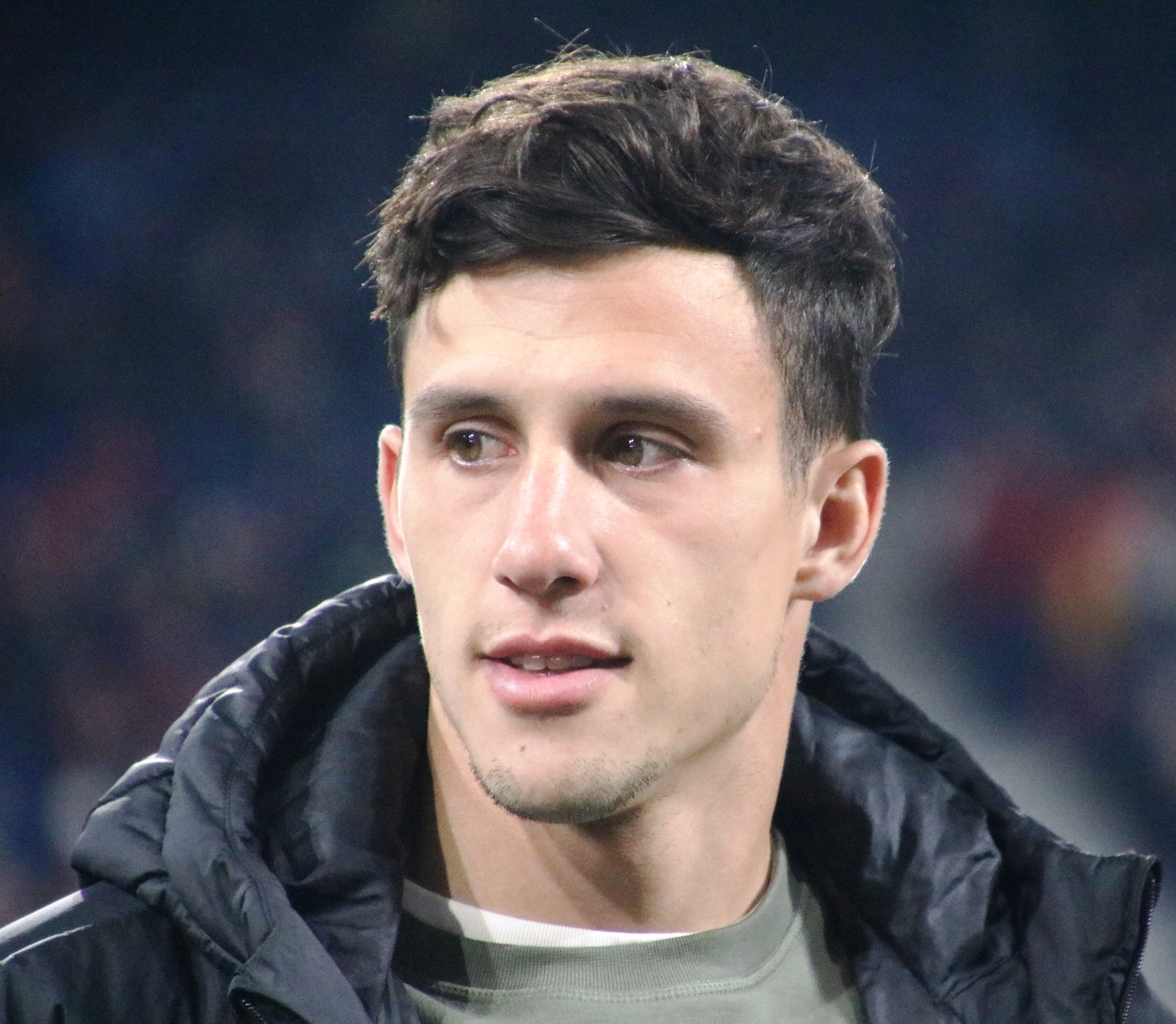
- Capaldo with Red Bull Salzburg in 2025

Personal information
- Full name: Nicolás Capaldo Toboas
- Date of birth: 14 September 1998 (age 28)
- Place of birth: Santa Rosa, La Pampa, Argentina
- Height: 1.77 m (5 ft 10 in)
- Position: Centre back

Team information
- Current team: Hamburger SV
- Number: 24

Youth career
- 2004–2014: Deportivo Mac Allister
- 2015–2019: Boca Juniors

Senior career*
Years	Team	Apps	(Gls)
2019–2021	Boca Juniors	37	(0)
2021–2025	Red Bull Salzburg	83	(12)
2025–	Hamburger SV	32	(2)

International career^{‡}
2018–2020	Argentina U23	8	(2)
2026–	Argentina	1	(0)
- * Club domestic league appearances and goals as of 17 October 2026 ‡ National team caps and goals as of 6 June 2026

Nicolás Capaldo Taboas (born 14 September 1998) is an Argentine professional footballer who plays as a centre back for Bundesliga club Hamburger SV and the Argentina national team.

== Club career ==
Capaldo is a product of the Boca Juniors academy, he had been signed from Deportivo Mac Allister in 2015. Gustavo Alfaro called the midfielder up in 2019, initially for the mid-season break where he featured in a Torneo de Verano friendly with Unión Santa Fe on 16 January. After not being used while on the substitutes bench for away fixtures with San Martín and Belgrano, Capaldo made his debut in professional football during a Primera División match against Defensa y Justicia on 24 February at the Estadio Norberto "Tito" Tomaghello.

On 10 July 2025, after four seasons with Austrian Bundesliga club Red Bull Salzburg, Capaldo moved to Germany, joining Bundesliga club Hamburger SV permanently, for a €4.5 million estimated fee.

== International career ==
In September 2019, Capaldo was called up by the Argentina U23s ahead of an exhibition fixture with Bolivia. He played his first match a few days later against Colombia, and scored his first goal for the team against Brazil in a 1–0 win for the Gran Canaria invitational tournament final.

== Personal life ==
Born and raised in Argentina, Capaldo is of Italian descent.

== Career statistics ==
=== Club ===
As of match played 17 October 2026

Appearances and goals by club, season and competition
Club	Season	League			National cup		League cup		Continental		Other		Total	
Club	Season	Division	Apps	Goals	Apps	Goals	Apps	Goals	Apps	Goals	Apps	Goals	Apps	Goals
Boca Juniors	2018–19	Argentine Primera División	1	0	1	0	3	0	5 (Note: Appearances in Copa Libertadores)	0	—		10	0
Boca Juniors	2019–20	Argentine Primera División	13	0	7	0	6	0	12	0	—		38	0
Boca Juniors	2020–21	Argentine Primera División	0	0	0	0	12	0	5	0	—		17	0
Boca Juniors	Total		14	0	8	0	21	0	22	0	—		65	0
Red Bull Salzburg	2021–22	Austrian Bundesliga	27	3	6	2	—		8 (Note: Appearances in UEFA Champions League)	0	—		41	5
Red Bull Salzburg	2022–23	Austrian Bundesliga	23	5	2	0	—		5 (Note: Three appearances in UEFA Champions League, two appearances and one goal in UEFA Europa League)	1	—		30	6
Red Bull Salzburg	2023–24	Austrian Bundesliga	10	0	2	0	—		4	0	—		16	0
Red Bull Salzburg	2024–25	Austrian Bundesliga	23	4	4	0	—		12	0	0	0	39	4
Red Bull Salzburg	Total		83	12	14	2	—		29	1	0	0	126	15
Hamburger SV	2025–26	Bundesliga	26	1	1	0	—		—		—		27	1
Hamburger SV	2026–27	Bundesliga	6	1	1	0	—		—		—		7	1
Hamburger SV	Total		32	2	2	0	—		—		—		34	2
Career total			129	14	24	2	21	0	51	0	0	0	225	17

=== International ===
As of match played 6 June 2026

Appearances and goals by national team and year
National team	Year	Apps	Goals
Argentina	2026	1	0
Total		1	0

== Honours ==
Boca Juniors

- Argentine Primera División: 2019–20
- Copa Argentina: 2019–20
- Copa de la Liga Profesional: 2020
- Supercopa Argentina: 2018

Red Bull Salzburg

- Austrian Bundesliga: 2021–22, 2022–23
- Austrian Cup: 2021–22

Argentina U23

- Pre-Olympic Tournament: 2020
