= Jorman Campuzano =

Colombian footballer (born 1996)

Personal information
- Full name: Jorman David Campuzano Puentes
- Date of birth: 30 April 1996 (age 30)
- Place of birth: Tamalameque, Colombia
- Height: 1.75 m (5 ft 9 in)
- Position: Central midfielder

Team information
- Current team: Atletico Nacional
- Number: 21

Senior career*
| Years | Team | Apps | (Gls) |
| 2015–2018 | Deportivo Pereira | 80 | (1) |
| 2018 | → Atlético Nacional (loan) | 47 | (0) |
| 2019–2025 | Boca Juniors | 91 | (1) |
| 2022–2023 | → Giresunspor (loan) | 27 | (2) |
| 2024–2025 | → Atletico Nacional (loan) | 41 | (0) |
| 2025– | Atletico Nacional | 23 | (3) |

International career^{‡}
| 2018– | Colombia | 4 | (0) |
- * Club domestic league appearances and goals as of 11 December 2025 ‡ National team caps and goals as of 16 December 2023

Jorman David Campuzano Puentes (born 30 April 1996) is a Colombian professional footballer who plays as a central midfielder for Atletico Nacional and the Colombia national team.

== Early life ==
At the age of 15, Campuzano with a strong personality and against what his family wanted left his native town Tamalameque. He came to the city of Bogotá seeking for opportunities. He could get a job as a domicile in a chicken shop from the town of Bosa where he played his first amateur football tournaments earning fifty thousand pesos (15 dollars) for game played.

== Professional career ==
=== Youth player ===
He took his first steps to reach professional football at the Churta Millos Soccer School Club. Then a teacher from La Equidad offered him to play in the "Basic Forces" of that club. Later he would travel to Buenos Aires, Argentina to train at Banfield where they prepared him mentally and physically. From there he returned to Colombia to prepare with Deportivo Pereira where with just one training he was promoted to the professional team by coach Hernán Lisi.

=== Deportivo Pereira ===
He debuted as a professional on April 15, 2015, on matchday 4 of the Copa Colombia. Despite being his first match in a professional club, he played 65 minutes against Atlético Huila in the Guillermo Plazas Alcid Stadium where they lost 3–1.

In the following season he scored his first goal on August 2, 2016, against Atlético Fútbol Club in a 7–2 victory in the Categoría Primera B.

=== Atlético Nacional ===
After showing a good level at Deportivo Pereira, he was contacted by coach Miguel Ángel Russo to play for Millonarios. However, Atlético Nacional appeared to improve the offer, so Campuzano opted to sign with them.

In January 2018, he was confirmed as a new player for Atlético Nacional of the Categoría Primera A. Campuzano made his debut for Atlético Nacional on 31 January 2018 against Millonarios in the first leg of the Superliga Colombiana.

== International career ==
Campuzano received his maiden call-up for the Colombia national football team on 29 August 2018. He made his debut against Venezuela on September 8, 2018.

== Career statistics ==
=== Club ===
As of match played 27 November 2023

Appearances and goals by club, season and competition
| Club | Season | League | | | National Cup | | Continental | | Other | | Total | |
| Club | Season | Division | Apps | Goals | Apps | Goals | Apps | Goals | Apps | Goals | Apps | Goals |
|---|---|---|---|---|---|---|---|---|---|---|---|---|
| Deportivo Pereira | 2015 | Categoría Primera B | 8 | 0 | 3 | 0 | — | | — | | 11 | 0 |
| Deportivo Pereira | 2016 | Categoría Primera B | 31 | 1 | 4 | 0 | — | | — | | 35 | 1 |
| Deportivo Pereira | 2017 | Categoría Primera B | 34 | 0 | — | | — | | — | | 34 | 0 |
| Deportivo Pereira | Total | | 73 | 1 | 7 | 0 | — | | — | | 80 | 1 |
| Atlético Nacional (loan) | 2018 | Categoría Primera A | 32 | 0 | 6 | 0 | 7 (Note: Appearances in Copa Libertadores) | 0 | 2 (Note: Appearances in Superliga Colombiana) | 0 | 47 | 0 |
| Boca Juniors | 2018–19 | Argentine Primera División | 10 | 0 | 0 | 0 | 0 | 0 | 0 | 0 | 10 | 0 |
| Boca Juniors | 2019–20 | Argentine Primera División | 13 | 0 | 1 | 0 | 2 | 0 | 0 | 0 | 16 | 0 |
| Boca Juniors | 2020–21 | Argentine Primera División | 7 | 1 | 12 | 0 | 9 | 0 | — | | 28 | 0 |
| Boca Juniors | 2021 | Argentine Primera División | 25 | 1 | 0 | 0 | 3 | 0 | 0 | 0 | 28 | 1 |
| Boca Juniors | 2022 | Argentine Primera División | 13 | 1 | 0 | 0 | 3 | 0 | — | | 16 | 1 |
| Boca Juniors | 2023 | Argentine Primera División | 13 | 0 | 1 | 0 | 3 | 0 | — | | 17 | 0 |
| Boca Juniors | Total | | 91 | 3 | 14 | 0 | 20 | 0 | 2 | 0 | 127 | 2 |
| Giresunspor (loan) | 2022–23 | Süper Lig | 27 | 2 | 0 | 0 | — | | — | | 27 | 2 |
| Career total | | | 213 | 5 | 27 | 0 | 20 | 0 | 2 | 0 | 262 | 5 |

=== International ===
As of match played 16 December 2023

Appearances and goals by national team and year
| National team | Year | Apps | Goals |
|---|---|---|---|
| Colombia | 2018 | 1 | 0 |
| Colombia | 2019 | 1 | 0 |
| Colombia | 2020 | 0 | 0 |
| Colombia | 2021 | 0 | 0 |
| Colombia | 2022 | 0 | 0 |
| Colombia | 2023 | 2 | 0 |
| Total | | 4 | 0 |

== Honours ==
Atlético Nacional

- Copa Colombia: 2018, 2024
- Categoría Primera A : 2024 Finalización
- Súper Liga Colombia 2025

Boca Juniors

- Primera División: 2019–20
- Copa Argentina: 2019–20
- Copa de la Liga Profesional: 2020, 2022
- Supercopa Argentina: 2018
