= Emmanuel Mas =

Argentine footballer

Personal information
- Full name: Emmanuel David Mas Sgros
- Date of birth: 15 January 1989 (age 37)
- Place of birth: San Juan, Argentina
- Height: 1.83 m (6 ft 0 in)
- Position: Left-back

Team information
- Current team: Juventud
- Number: 23

Youth career
- San Martín SJ

Senior career*
Years	Team	Apps	(Gls)
2008–2013	San Martín SJ	103	(4)
2013–2016	San Lorenzo	93	(6)
2017–2018	Trabzonspor	32	(1)
2018–2021	Boca Juniors	43	(3)
2021	Orlando City	16	(0)
2022–2023	Estudiantes	53	(1)
2023–2024	Colón	11	(0)
2024	Independiente Rivadavia	10	(0)
2024–	Juventud	42	(1)

International career
2015–2017	Argentina	8	(0)
- * Club domestic league appearances and goals as of 1 October 2025

Emmanuel David Mas Sgros (born 15 January 1989) is an Argentine footballer who plays as a left-back for Juventud of the Liga AUF Uruguaya. He has been capped internationally eight times for Argentina.

Mas began his career at San Martín de San Juan before moving to San Lorenzo where he won the Argentine Primera División 2013 Inicial and 2014 Copa Libertadores. In 2017, he joined Turkish club Trabzonspor, before returning to Argentina with Boca Juniors where he won another two Primera División titles. In 2021 he played for Orlando City in Major League Soccer.

== Club career ==
=== San Martín de San Juan ===
Born in San Juan, Argentina, Mas came through the San Martín de San Juan youth academy. He made his senior debut as a 19 year old on 21 June 2008, starting in the final game of the 2007–08 season as an already-relegated San Martín lost 1–0 to Newell's Old Boys.

While in the Primera Nacional, Mas found his game time limited to nine appearances in 2008–09 and then four the following season as San Martín failed to challenge for promotion during the first two seasons. He established himself as a starter in the 2010–11 season, playing 20 games during the regular season and scored his first goal for the club on 6 March 2011, a 90+2 minute equaliser against CAI Rivadavia. Mas played in both promotion playoff legs against Gimnasia de La Plata as San Martín won promotion 2–1 on aggregate.

He played every minute during the 2011 Apertura and scored his first top-flight goal on 26 August 2011 in a 2–2 draw with Estudiantes de La Plata. At the end of the season he played in both legs of the relegation playoff as San Martín saved themselves from relegation, drawing 0–0 with Rosario Central. The following season he played in 37 of the 38 league games, his most in San Martín, with his performances leading to transfer interest.

=== San Lorenzo ===
In July 2013, Mas signed for San Lorenzo. His scored his first goal on 17 November 2013 in a 4–2 win over Belgrano as San Lorenzo clinched the 2013 Inicial title. Mas was an undisputed starter during San Lorenzo's run to the 2014 Copa Libertadores finals, starting all 14 games as the team beat Paraguay's Nacional over two-legs in the final to win the first Copa Libertadores title in club history. The victory qualified San Lorenzo for the 2014 FIFA Club World Cup, held in Morocco in December 2014. They beat 2013–14 OFC Champions League winners Auckland City FC in extra-time in the semi-final before losing to Spanish giants Real Madrid in the final. Mas played every minute in both games. Between 19 May 2014 and 9 May 2015, Mas played every minute of every game without being substituted, a run of 52 matches. While with San Lorenzo, Mas' performances earned him his first call-up to the Argentina national team in August 2015.

=== Trabzonspor ===
On 4 January 2017, Turkish Süper Lig club Trabzonspor announced the signing of Mas for €1.5 million on a three-and-a-half-year contract until June 2020.

=== Boca Juniors ===
On 4 January 2018, Mas returned to the Argentine Primera División following a €2.3 million transfer to Boca Juniors. His Trabzonspor manager Rıza Çalımbay was quoted as saying he "did not want to sell Mas" but the player was homesick and wanted to return home to improve his chances of making Argentina's 2018 World Cup squad that summer. In three and a half years, Mas played 82 games for Boca Juniors, winning the league title in 2017–18 and 2019–20, as well as the 2020 Copa de la Liga Profesional. He left Boca upon the expiry of his contract on 30 June 2021.

=== Orlando City ===
Having originally been in negotiations and close to a deal with Independiente, Mas eventually moved to the United States on 14 July 2021 to sign a sixth-month contract with MLS side Orlando City until the end of the 2021 season with an additional club option year. Mas had his contract option declined at the end of the 2021 season having made 18 appearances in all competitions.

=== Estudiantes ===
On 6 January 2022, Mas returned to the Argentine Primera División and signed with Estudiantes LP.

== International career ==
Mas earned his first call-up to the Argentina national team in August 2015 by Tata Martino as an injury replacement for Pablo Zabaleta. He made his international debut on 4 September 2015, starting in a 7–0 friendly win over Bolivia at BBVA Stadium, Houston. He also appeared as a substitute in the following game, a 2–2 draw with Mexico. A month later, Mas was recalled to the squad during the next window and started both matches as Argentina began 2018 FIFA World Cup qualification with a 2–0 defeat to Ecuador and a goalless draw with Paraguay. He was an unused substitute during the next set of qualifiers in November 2015 before being left out of the squad in March 2016. He was not named to the squad for the 2016 Copa América but was recalled in September, starting in a World Cup qualifying win over Uruguay. He played in a further three matches, all as the starting left back, before being left out for the final four games as Argentina narrowly rescued qualifying in the last automatic spot. Despite Martino defending Mas' repeated selection as a chance to look at players in contention to be taken to the World Cup, he was eventually left out of the squad and has not received a call-up since.

== Career statistics ==
=== Club ===
As of 23 November 2021

Club	Season	League			National Cup (Note: Copa Argentina and Türkiye Kupası)		League Cup (Note: Copa de la Superliga and MLS Cup Playoffs)		Continental		Other		Total	
Club	Season	Division	Apps	Goals	Apps	Goals	Apps	Goals	Apps	Goals	Apps	Goals	Apps	Goals
San Martín (SJ)	2007–08	Primera División	1	0	—		—		—		—		1	0
San Martín (SJ)	2008–09	Nacional B	9	0	—		—		—		—		9	0
San Martín (SJ)	2009–10	Nacional B	4	0	—		—		—		—		4	0
San Martín (SJ)	2010–11	Nacional B	20	1	—		—		—		2 (Note: Primera División-Primera B Nacional promotion/relegation playoff)	0	22	1
San Martín (SJ)	2011–12	Primera División	32	1	—		—		—		2	0	34	1
San Martín (SJ)	2012–13	Primera División	37	2	1	0	—		—		—		38	2
San Martín (SJ)	Total		103	4	1	0	0	0	0	0	4	0	108	4
San Lorenzo	2013–14	Primera División	20	2	3	0	—		1 (Note: Copa Sudamericana)	0	—		24	2
San Lorenzo	2014	Primera División	19	2	2	0	—		14 (Note: Copa Libertadores)	2	2 (Note: 2014 FIFA Club World Cup)	0	37	4
San Lorenzo	2015	Primera División	29	1	3	0	—		6	0	2 (Note: 2015 Recopa Sudamericana)	0	40	1
San Lorenzo	2016	Primera División	13	0	3	0	—		5	0	1 (Note: Supercopa Argentina)	0	22	0
San Lorenzo	2016–17	Primera División	12	1	3	0	—		8	1	—		23	2
San Lorenzo	Total		93	6	14	0	0	0	34	3	5	0	146	9
Trabzonspor	2016–17	Süper Lig	18	1	1	0	—		—		—		19	1
Trabzonspor	2017–18	Süper Lig	14	0	4	0	—		—		—		18	0
Trabzonspor	Total		32	1	5	0	0	0	0	0	0	0	37	1
Boca Juniors	2017–18	Primera División	6	1	0	0	—		2	0	0	0	8	1
Boca Juniors	2018–19	Primera División	19	2	2	0	6	1	8	0	1	0	36	3
Boca Juniors	2019–20	Primera División	5	0	0	0	1	0	10	0	—		16	0
Boca Juniors	2020–21	Primera División	13 (Note: Copa de la Liga Profesional)	0	2	1	—		7	0	—		22	1
Boca Juniors	Total		43	3	4	1	7	1	27	0	1	0	82	5
Orlando City	2021	Major League Soccer	16	0	—		1	0	1 (Note: Leagues Cup)	0	—		18	0
Career total			287	14	24	1	8	1	62	3	10	0	391	19

=== International ===
As of 23 March 2017

Argentina
Year	Apps	Goals
2015	4	0
2016	3	0
2017	1	0
Total	8	0

== Honours ==
San Lorenzo

- Argentine Primera División: 2013 Inicial
- Supercopa Argentina: 2015
- Copa Libertadores: 2014
- FIFA Club World Cup runner-up: 2014

Boca Juniors

- Argentine Primera División: 2017–18, 2019–20
- Copa Argentina: 2019–20
- Copa de la Liga Profesional: 2020
- Supercopa Argentina: 2018
