= 2018 Supercopa Argentina =

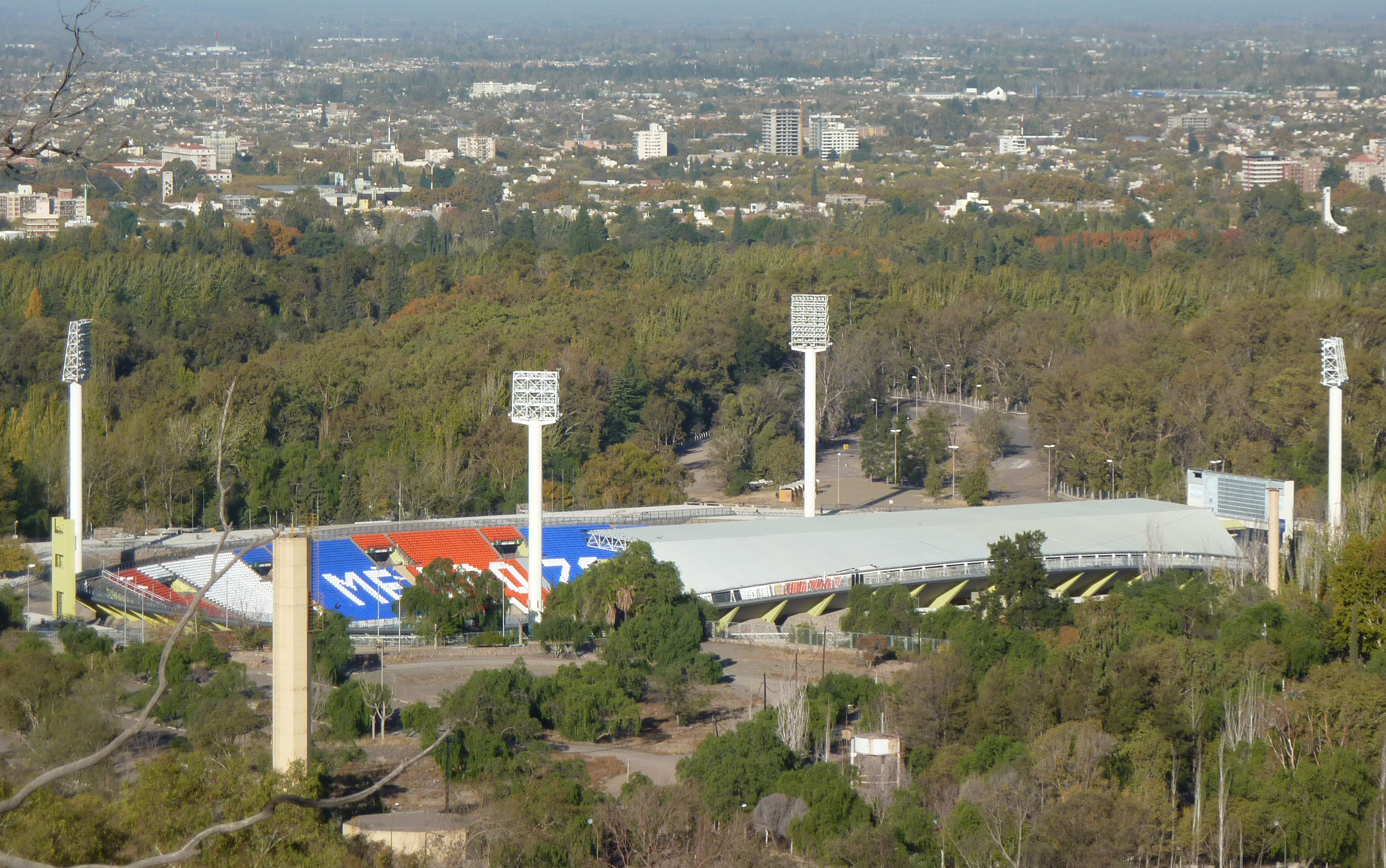
- Estadio Malvinas Argentinas, venue
Boca Juniors	Rosario Central
0	0
- Boca Juniors won 6–5 on penalties
- Date: 2 May 2019
- Venue: Estadio Malvinas Argentinas, Mendoza
- Man of the Match: Sebastián Villa
- Referee: Fernando Rapallini

The 2018 Supercopa Argentina Final was the 7th edition of the Supercopa Argentina, an annual football match contested by the winners of the Argentine Primera División and Copa Argentina competitions. Initially the match was scheduled for 4 April 2019 at the Estadio Malvinas Argentinas in Mendoza but it was rescheduled for 2 May 2019.

Boca Juniors and Rosario Central qualified after winning the 2017–18 Argentine Primera División tournament and the 2017–18 Copa Argentina, respectively.

Boca Juniors won the match via a penalty shoot-out after the game had finished 0–0. It was their first Supercopa Argentina title.

== Qualified teams ==
Team	Qualification	Previous app.
Boca Juniors	2017–18 Primera División champions	3 (2012, 2015, 2017)
Rosario Central	2017–18 Copa Argentina champions	None

- Bold: indicates winning years

== Match ==
=== Summary ===
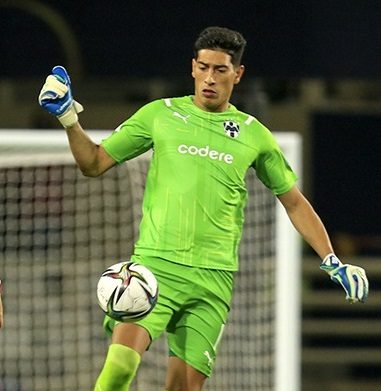
Goalkeeper Esteban Andrada stopped the last shot that allowed Boca Juniors to win 6–5 on penalties

The initial scheme of both teams foreshadowed a dominance in possession of the ball by Boca Juniors against a Rosario Central team stationed in its field and focused on taking advantage of the spaces through counterattacks. Although they lacked fluidity at the start of the match and there were repeated disagreements between their offensive players, Boca Juniors focused their plays on the right sector, with the speed of Sebastián Villa as the protagonist. The striker's poor finishing precision prevented the team led by Gustavo Alfaro from having concrete options in the initial stage.

The first goal attempt came through a play by defender Julio Buffarini, who was fouled while running to the rival area. The free kick awarded was taken by Mauro Zárate so that Emmanuel Mas won in the opposing area, but the destination of his header was deflected.

Boca Juniors insisted to attack: an advance from central back Carlos Izquierdoz, some doubt from goalkeeper Jeremías Ledesma and a move from Darío Benedetto once again put Boca on the verge of scoring, but with no success. Before reaching the 30th minute, Rosario Central managed to prove Esteban Andrada's skills with a violent mid-distance shot from Rodrigo Villagra, but it was saved by Boca Juniors goalkeeper.

Nevertheless, fatigue began to take its toll on Rosario Central's defensive structure during the second half and Boca found spaces that resulted in opportunities to break Jeremías Ledesma's resistance. A one-two pass between Nahitan Nández and Mauro Zárate ended with a deflected left foot shot from the Uruguayan, who would later crash a shot into the goalpost. Forward Cristian Pavón came from the bench and surprised with a shot that bounced off the crossbar and seemed to hit inside the goal, but was not validated by referee Fernando Rapallini. The Rosarian team searched with set-piece attempts and could have taken advantage of Esteban Andrada's mistakes at the start, but none of both teams could break the tie.

As no extra time was conducted, the 0–0 forced to conduct a penalty shoot-out, where Boca Juniors converted all of their penalties while on the other side, the last penalty by Fabián Rinaudo was saved by Andrada, allowing Boca Juniors to win their first Supercopa Argentina title.

=== Details ===
2 May 2019
21:10 UTC−3

Boca Juniors	0–0	Rosario Central
	Report
Penalties
Benedetto (penalty scored); Tevez (penalty scored); Pavón (penalty scored); Villa (penalty scored); Buffarini (penalty scored); Izquierdoz (penalty scored)	6–5	(penalty scored) Ortigoza; (penalty scored) Gil; (penalty scored) Parot; (penalty scored) Zampedri; (penalty scored) Caruzzo; (penalty missed) Rinaudo

Estadio Malvinas Argentinas, Mendoza
Referee: Fernando Rapallini

**Boca Juniors**	**Rosario Central**

GK	31	(Argentina) Esteban Andrada
DF	4	(Argentina) Julio Buffarini	(yellow card) 18'
DF	20	(Argentina) Lisandro López
DF	24	(Argentina) Carlos Izquierdoz	(yellow card) 45'
DF	3	(Argentina) Emmanuel Mas
MF	22	(Colombia) Sebastián Villa	(yellow card) 90'
MF	15	(Uruguay) Nahitan Nández
MF	23	(Argentina) Iván Marcone
MF	30	(Argentina) Emanuel Reynoso	(yellow card) 41'	(substituted off) 61'
FW	19	(Argentina) Mauro Zárate		(substituted off) 78'
FW	9	(Argentina) Darío Benedetto (c)
Substitutes:
GK	12	(Argentina) Marcos Díaz
DF	6	(Paraguay) Júnior Alonso
MF	27	(Colombia) Jorman Campuzano
MF	39	(Argentina) Agustín Almendra
FW	7	(Argentina) Cristian Pavón		(substituted on) 78'
FW	10	(Argentina) Carlos Tevez		(substituted on) 61'
FW	17	(Argentina) Ramón Ábila
Manager:
(Argentina) Gustavo Alfaro

GK	1	(Argentina) Jeremías Ledesma
DF	12	(Argentina) Nahuel Molina
DF	32	(Argentina) Facundo Almada	(yellow card) 66'
DF	2	(Argentina) Matías Caruzzo (c)
DF	19	(Argentina) Miguel Barbieri	(yellow card) 69'
DF	24	(Chile) Alfonso Parot	(yellow card) 88'
MF	13	(Argentina) Rodrigo Villagra		(substituted off) 80'
MF	21	(Argentina) Fabián Rinaudo
MF	5	(Argentina) Leonardo Gil
FW	34	(Argentina) Maximiliano Lovera		(substituted off) 84'
FW	9	(Argentina) Claudio Riaño		(substituted off) 64'
Substitutes:
GK	31	(Argentina) Josué Ayala
DF	4	(Argentina) Gonzalo Bettini
DF	6	(Argentina) Marcelo Ortiz
MF	7	(Argentina) Joaquín Pereyra	(yellow card) 81'	(substituted on) 80'
MF	10	(Paraguay) Néstor Ortigoza		(substituted on) 84'
FW	17	(Argentina) Germán Herrera
FW	20	(Argentina) Fernando Zampedri		(substituted on) 64'
Manager:
(Argentina) Diego Cocca

Assistant referees:
Gabriel Chade
Pablo González
Fourth official:
Jorge Baliño

**Match rules**

- 90 minutes.
- Penalty shoot-out if scores still level.
- Seven named substitutes.
- Maximum of three substitutions.

=== Statistics ===
Overall
	Boca Juniors	Rosario Central
Goals scored	0	0
Total shots	19	6
Shots on target	7	4
Ball possession	60%	40%
Corner kicks	10	3
Fouls committed	12	23
Offsides	1	2
Yellow cards	4	4
Red cards	0	0

2018 Supercopa Argentina winners
**Boca Juniors**
**1st Title**
