= Carlos Izquierdoz =

Argentine footballer

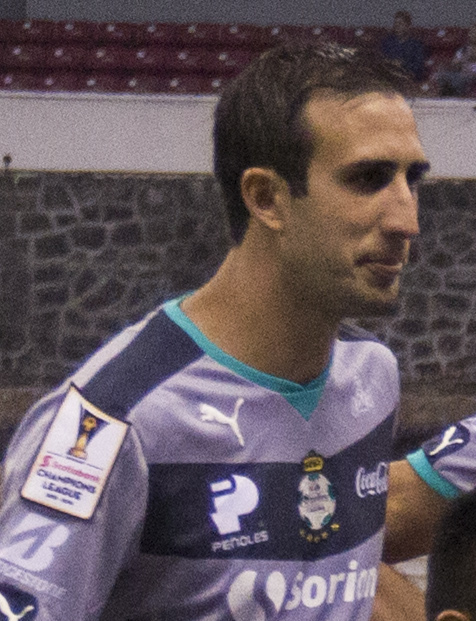
- Izquierdoz with Santos Laguna in 2016

Personal information
- Full name: Carlos Roberto Izquierdoz
- Date of birth: 3 November 1988 (age 37)
- Place of birth: San Carlos de Bariloche, Argentina
- Height: 1.85 m (6 ft 1 in)
- Position: Centre-back

Team information
- Current team: Lanús
- Number: 24

Youth career
- 2004–2009: Lanús

Senior career*
| Years | Team | Apps | (Gls) |
| 2009–2014 | Lanús | 100 | (7) |
| 2009–2010 | → Atlanta (loan) | 35 | (5) |
| 2014–2018 | Santos Laguna | 141 | (15) |
| 2018–2022 | Boca Juniors | 85 | (6) |
| 2022–2024 | Sporting Gijón | 57 | (2) |
| 2024– | Lanús | 63 | (2) |
- * Club domestic league appearances and goals as of 17:20, 6 June 2026 (UTC)

Carlos Roberto Izquierdoz (born 3 November 1988) is an Argentine professional footballer who plays as a centre-back for and captains Argentine Primera División club Lanús.

== Career ==
=== Lanus ===
Izquierdoz came through the Lanús youth levels.

==== Atlanta (loan) ====
On 8 July 2009, Izquierdoz joined Atlanta on loan from Lanús.

==== Return to Lanús ====
After his return from loan, Izquierdoz became a regular at Lanús, helping the club win the 2013 Copa Sudamericana.

=== Santos Laguna ===
On 29 May 2014, Izquierdoz signed with Liga MX club Santos Laguna.

=== Boca Juniors ===
On 5 July 2018, Izquierdoz joined Primera División club Boca Juniors.

=== Sporting Gijón ===
On 28 July 2022, Izquierdoz joined Segunda División club Sporting Gijón, on a two-year contract.

== Honours ==
Lanús

- Copa Sudamericana: 2013, 2025
- Recopa Sudamericana: 2026

Santos Laguna

- Liga MX: Clausura 2015, Clausura 2018
- Copa MX: Apertura 2014
- Campeón de Campeones: 2015

Boca Juniors

- Primera División: 2019–20, 2022
- Copa Argentina: 2019–20
- Copa de la Liga Profesional: 2020, 2022
- Supercopa Argentina: 2018
