= Federico González =

Argentine footballer

Personal information
- Full name: Federico Rafael González
- Date of birth: 6 January 1987 (age 39)
- Place of birth: Colón, Argentina
- Height: 1.82 m (6 ft 0 in)
- Position: Forward

Team information
- Current team: Olimpo

Youth career
- Independiente

Senior career*
Years	Team	Apps	(Gls)
2008–2009	Ferro Carril Oeste	16	(3)
2009–2010	Independiente	8	(0)
2010–2015	Atlético Rafaela	160	(32)
2015–2019	Tigre	68	(21)
2017	→ Puebla (loan)	7	(1)
2019–2021	Estudiantes	31	(1)
2021–2022	Audax Italiano	11	(1)
2022–2023	Quilmes	31	(6)
2023–2024	Carlos A. Mannucci	27	(2)
2024–2026	San Martín SJ	46	(6)
2026–	Olimpo	2	(0)
- * Club domestic league appearances and goals as of 16:59, 14 April 2026 (UTC)

Federico Rafael González (born January 6, 1987) is an Argentine professional footballer who plays for Olimpo.
