= Julio Buffarini =

Argentine footballer (born 1988)

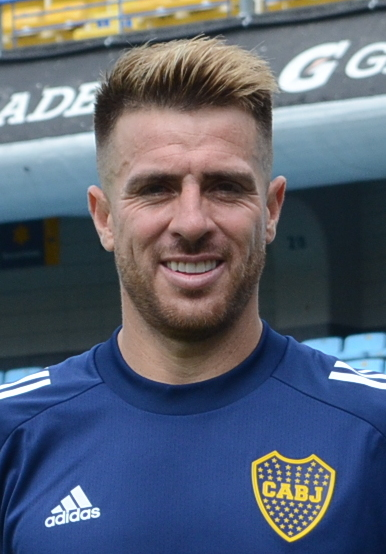
- Buffarini with Boca Juniors in 2020

Personal information
- Full name: Julio Alberto Buffarini
- Date of birth: 18 August 1988 (age 38)
- Place of birth: Córdoba, Argentina
- Height: 1.68 m (5 ft 6 in)
- Position: Right-back

Team information
- Current team: Rampla Juniors

Youth career
- 2001–2005: Talleres

Senior career*
| Years | Team | Apps | (Gls) |
| 2006–2010 | Talleres | 73 | (8) |
| 2010–2011 | Atlético Tucumán | 27 | (4) |
| 2011–2012 | Ferro Carril Oeste | 31 | (6) |
| 2012–2016 | San Lorenzo | 137 | (11) |
| 2016–2017 | São Paulo | 24 | (0) |
| 2018–2021 | Boca Juniors | 68 | (1) |
| 2021–2022 | Huesca | 17 | (0) |
| 2022 | → Cartagena (loan) | 7 | (0) |
| 2022–2023 | Talleres | 16 | (1) |
| 2023–2024 | Independiente | 7 | (0) |
| 2025– | Rampla Juniors | 7 | (0) |
- * Club domestic league appearances and goals as of 17:52, 25 May 2025 (UTC)

Julio Alberto Buffarini (Spanish pronunciation: [ˈxuljo βufaˈɾini]; born 18 August 1988) is an Argentine professional footballer who plays as a right-back for Rampla Juniors.

== Club career ==
He spent his entire club career in South America until 5 August 2021, when he signed for Spanish Segunda División side SD Huesca. The following 27 January, he moved on loan to fellow league team FC Cartagena for the remainder of the season.

== International career ==
In October 2016, Buffarini was called up to the national team by coach Edgardo Bauza, for a pair of World Cup Qualification Games against Brazil and Colombia. Buffarini failed to make an appearance during the matches.

== Honours ==
San Lorenzo

- Primera División: 2013 Inicial
- Copa Libertadores: 2014
- Supercopa Argentina: 2015

Boca Juniors

- Primera División: 2017–18, 2019–20
- Copa Argentina: 2019–20
- Copa de la Liga Profesional: 2020
- Supercopa Argentina: 2018
