= Matías Caruzzo =

Argentine footballer

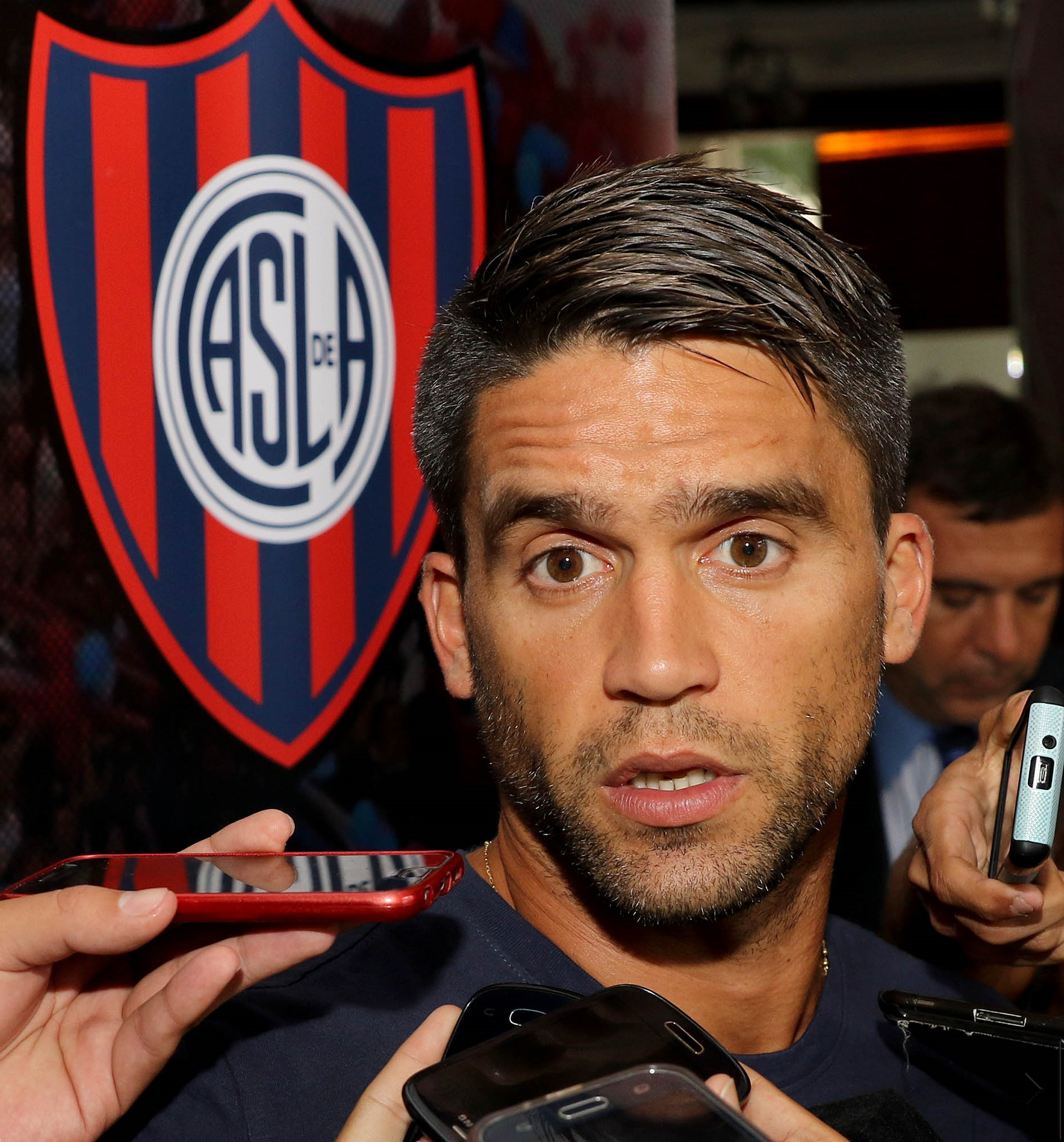
- Caruzzo with San Lorenzo in 2016

Personal information
- Full name: Matías Nicolás Caruzzo
- Date of birth: August 15, 1984 (age 42)
- Place of birth: Buenos Aires, Argentina
- Height: 1.85 m (6 ft 1 in)
- Position: Centre back

Youth career
- 2003–2005: Argentinos Juniors

Senior career*
Years	Team	Apps	(Gls)
2006–2010	Argentinos Juniors	120	(4)
2010–2014	Boca Juniors	73	(2)
2014	Universidad de Chile	9	(1)
2014–2015	Argentinos Juniors	20	(0)
2015–2018	San Lorenzo	79	(6)
2018–2019	Rosario Central	29	(2)
2020–2021	Argentinos Juniors	5	(0)
Total		335	(15)

International career
2008–2017	Argentina	6	(0)
- * Club domestic league appearances and goals

Matías Nicolás Caruzzo (born August 15, 1984, in Buenos Aires) is an Argentine former football defender. He last played for Argentinos Juniors.

== Playing career ==
=== Club ===
Caruzzo came through Argentinos Juniors' youth development system to make his professional debut on March 25, 2006, in a 3–1 away defeat to Gimnasia y Esgrima de Jujuy. He went on to establish himself as an important member of the first-team squad.

Caruzzo was an important member of the Argentinos Juniors team that won the 2010 Clausura championship. He played in all 19 games and scored a vital goal in their 4–3 win against Independiente in the penultimate game of their championship-winning campaign.

Caruzzo followed Claudio Borghi, the 2010 Clausura champion coach of Argentinos Juniors, to Boca Juniors for the dispute of the 2010–11 Argentine Primera División season. Boca paid Argentinos a 2,500,000 US dollar fee, plus a percentage of the future sale. In January 2014, Caruzzo signed a contract with Universidad de Chile for 3 years.

=== International ===
On May 20, 2009, Caruzzo made his international debut in a friendly match against Panama. The Argentine team, made up of players based in the Argentine Primera División, won the game 3–1.

== Honours ==
Argentinos Juniors

- Primera División: 2010 Clausura

Boca Juniors

- Primera División: 2011 Apertura
- Copa Argentina: 2011–12

San Lorenzo

- Supercopa Argentina: 2015

Rosario Central

- Copa Argentina: 2017–18
