= Marcos Díaz (footballer) =

Argentine footballer

Personal information
- Full name: Marcos Guillermo Díaz
- Date of birth: 5 February 1986 (age 40)
- Place of birth: Santa Fe, Argentina
- Height: 1.86 m (6 ft 1 in)
- Position: Goalkeeper

Team information
- Current team: Llacuabamba

Youth career
- 1995–2009: Colón

Senior career*
Years	Team	Apps	(Gls)
2009–2014	Colón	12	(0)
2012–2013	→ Gimnasia Jujuy (loan)	8	(0)
2013–2014	→ Huracán (loan)	19	(0)
2014–2018	Huracán	124	(0)
2019–2020	Boca Juniors	4	(0)
2020–2021	Talleres	12	(0)
2021–2022	Huracán	38	(0)
2023–2024	Santa Clara	1	(0)
2025–2026	Colón	16	(0)
2026–	Llacuabamba	0	(0)
- * Club domestic league appearances and goals as of 20:23, 8 March 2026 (UTC)

Marcos Guillermo Díaz (born 5 February 1986) is an Argentine professional footballer who plays as a goalkeeper for Peruvian Segunda División club Llacuabamba.

== Career ==
Díaz joined Colón at the age of nine, being promoted to the first-team in 2009. He made his professional debut during 2009–10 in a 4–1 victory over Arsenal de Sarandí on 8 October 2009. Eleven further appearances followed throughout his first three seasons with Colón. In July 2012, Díaz departed on loan to sign for Primera B Nacional side Gimnasia y Esgrima. He made eight appearances as the club ended the season in tenth. Ahead of 2013–14, Díaz joined fellow Primera B Nacional team Huracán on loan. He went on to feature twenty times and was subsequently signed permanently in June 2014.

Between 2013 and 2014, Díaz won the Copa Argentina and Supercopa Argentina with Huracán. In his first full season, 2014, Huracán won promotion to the Primera División. In 2015, Díaz played forty-three matches, with sixteen coming in continental competition including ten in the 2015 Copa Sudamericana where Huracán reached the final but lost on penalties to Santa Fe. Díaz left on 31 December 2018, following the expiration of his contract; despite appearing sixteen times during 2018–19. Boca Juniors announced the signing of Díaz on 11 January 2019. On late 2020, Díaz joined Talleres.

In January 2023, Díaz signed a contract with Santa Clara in Portugal until June 2024.

== Career statistics ==
As of 3 May 2019.

Club statistics
Club	Season	League			Cup		Continental		Other		Total	
Club	Season	Division	Apps	Goals	Apps	Goals	Apps	Goals	Apps	Goals	Apps	Goals
Colón	2009–10	Primera División	2	0	0	0	0	0	0	0	2	0
Colón	2010–11	Primera División	2	0	0	0	—		0	0	2	0
Colón	2011–12	Primera División	8	0	2	0	—		0	0	10	0
Colón	2012–13	Primera División	0	0	0	0	0	0	0	0	0	0
Colón	2013–14	Primera División	0	0	0	0	—		0	0	0	0
Colón	Total		12	0	2	0	0	0	0	0	14	0
Gimnasia y Esgrima (loan)	2012–13	Primera B Nacional	8	0	0	0	—		0	0	8	0
Huracán (loan)	2013–14	Primera B Nacional	19	0	0	0	—		1 (Note: Appearance(s) in the Primera B Nacional play-offs)	0	20	0
Huracán	2014	Primera B Nacional	16	0	5	0	—		1	0	22	0
Huracán	2015	Primera División	25	0	1	0	16 (Note: Appearance(s) in the Copa Libertadores and Copa Sudamericana)	0	1 (Note: Appearance(s) in the Supercopa Argentina)	0	43	0
Huracán	2016	Primera División	16	0	0	0	9 (Note: Appearance(s) in the Copa Libertadores)	0	0	0	25	0
Huracán	2016–17	Primera División	28	0	3	0	0	0	0	0	31	0
Huracán	2017–18	Primera División	26	0	2	0	0	0	0	0	28	0
Huracán	2018–19	Primera División	14	0	2	0	—		0	0	16	0
Huracán	Total		124	0	13	0	25	0	3	0	165	0
Boca Juniors	2018–19	Primera División	1	0	1	0	0	0	0	0	2	0
Career total			165	0	14	0	25	0	3	0	207	0

== Honours ==
Huracán

- Copa Argentina: 2013–14
- Supercopa Argentina: 2014

Boca Juniors

- Primera División: 2019–20
- Supercopa Argentina: 2018
