= Sebastián Villa (footballer) =

Colombian footballer (born 1996)

Personal information
- Full name: Sebastián Villa Cano
- Date of birth: 19 May 1996 (age 30)
- Place of birth: Bello, Colombia
- Height: 1.79 m (5 ft 10 in)
- Position: Winger

Team information
- Current team: Boca Juniors
- Number: 22

Senior career*
Years	Team	Apps	(Gls)
2016–2018	Deportes Tolima	63	(5)
2018–2023	Boca Juniors	113	(21)
2023–2024	Beroe Stara Zagora	11	(5)
2024–2026	Independiente Rivadavia	68	(9)
2026–	Boca Juniors	8	(0)

International career^{‡}
2018–2019	Colombia	4	(0)
- * Club domestic league appearances and goals as of 10:53, 18 September 2026 (UTC) ‡ National team caps and goals as of 22 March 2019 (UTC)

Sebastián Villa Cano (born 19 May 1996) is a Colombian professional footballer who plays as a winger for Boca Juniors.

== Club career ==
Villa had previously played for Deportes Tolima, with whom he won the 2018 Categoría Primera A (Torneo Apertura), before joining Boca Juniors in the summer of the same year.

Villa made his debut in the Argentine Primera División on 12 August 2018 against Talleres de Córdoba. He scored his first goal for Boca in only his fourth appearance, a 3–0 home victory against Club Atlético Vélez Sarsfield on 3 September 2018. On 7 March 2021, Villa scored a brace in a 7–1 victory over Vélez Sarsfield.

Shortly after Boca's elimination from the Copa Libertadores round of 16 in July 2021, Villa stopped attending training and travelled to Colombia. Boca received offers from Benfica and Club Brugge in the summer, all of which were rejected. Eventually Villa was convinced by Juan Román Riquelme to stay at the club, and he returned to Buenos Aires in late August. Villa resumed training the following week and publicly apologized. He also received a sanction of fifteen days away from the field without pay, due to end at the beginning of October. However, Villa did not play again until 29 October, but played with the reserve team, where he scored a goal.

On 16 February 2022, he scored a brace in a 2–1 victory away to Aldosivi.

In June 2023, following his conviction, Villa travelled to Colombia. Boca Juniors required him to continue attending training despite the club's decision to exclude him from first-team matches.

In November 2023, Villa was announced as a new signing for Bulgarian top division side Beroe Stara Zagora.

In 2024, Villa joined Independiente Rivadavia. On 21 November 2024, he scored and assisted as Rivadavia beat River 2–1 at home.

On 11 July 2026, Villa returned to Boca Juniors for a sum of $6,500,000.

== International career ==
Villa was called up to the Colombia national football team on 29 August 2018. He made his debut against Venezuela on 8 September 2018.

== Legal issues ==
In April 2020, Villa's then-partner Daniela Cortés filed a complaint accusing him of physical and psychological abuse and published photographs showing injuries she said resulted from the incident. In June 2023, Villa was convicted of coercive threats and minor injuries aggravated by the relationship in the context of gender-based violence. Villa received a suspended sentence of two years and one month. Boca Juniors subsequently announced that he would not be selected for first-team competitions pending a final judicial decision.

== Honours ==
Deportes Tolima

- Copa Colombia: 2014
- Primera A: 2018 Apertura

Boca Juniors

- Copa Sudamericana: 2026
- Primera División: 2019–20, 2022, 2026 Liga
- Copa Argentina: 2019–20
- Copa de la Liga Profesional: 2020, 2022
- Supercopa Argentina: 2018, 2022

Independiente Rivadavia

- Copa Argentina: 2025
