= Gustavo Alfaro =

Argentine football manager

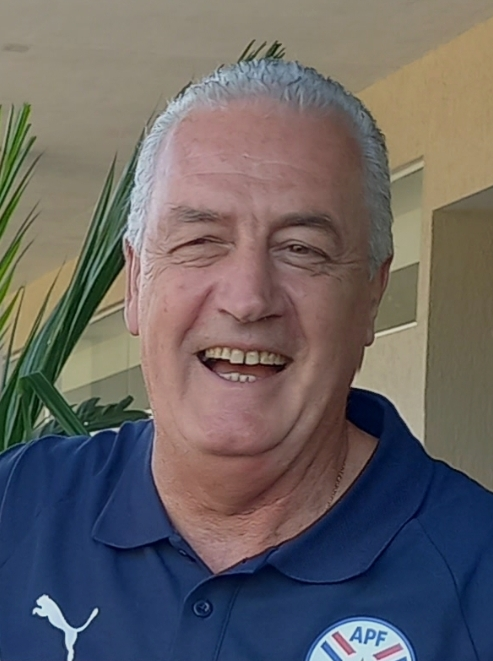
- Alfaro as the manager of Paraguay in 2026

Personal information
- Full name: Gustavo Julio Alfaro
- Date of birth: 14 August 1962 (age 64)
- Place of birth: Rafaela, Argentina
- Position: Midfielder

Team information
- Current team: Paraguay (head coach)

Senior career*
Years	Team	Apps	(Gls)
1988–1992	Atlético de Rafaela	126	(16)

Managerial career
- 1992–1995: Rafaela
- 1995–1996: Patronato
- 1996–1997: Quilmes
- 1998–2000: Rafaela
- 2000–2001: Belgrano
- 2001–2002: Olimpo
- 2003–2004: Quilmes
- 2005–2006: San Lorenzo
- 2006–2008: Sarandí
- 2008–2009: Rosario Central
- 2009–2010: Al-Ahli
- 2010–2014: Sarandí
- 2014–2015: Tigre
- 2016–2017: Gimnasia
- 2017–2018: Huracán
- 2018–2020: Boca Juniors
- 2020–2023: Ecuador
- 2023–2024: Costa Rica
- 2024–: Paraguay
- * Club domestic league appearances and goals

Gustavo Julio Alfaro (born 14 August 1962) is an Argentine football manager and former player who manages the Paraguay national football team.

Although Alfaro had a short career as a footballer, he was captain of the Atlético de Rafaela when they were promoted to the Argentine Primera División in 1989. Alfaro retired as a player from football in 1992 to concentrate on his coaching career. His first league title came with Arsenal de Sarandí in the 2012 Clausura.

At international level, he coached Ecuador at the 2022 FIFA World Cup before a stint in charge of Costa Rica. He was appointed as Paraguay coach in 2024 and led them to qualification for the 2026 FIFA World Cup.

== Managerial career ==
Alfaro started his career as a manager for Atlético de Rafaela and Patronato de Paraná in the early 1990s. He then had his first spell as manager of Quilmes and a second spell at Atlético de Rafaela.

In 2001, Alfaro became the manager of Olimpo and led them to the Primera B Nacional Apertura 2001 championship and promotion to the Primera.

In 2003, Alfaro led Quilmes to promotion. He stayed to manage the team for the following season (2003–04), achieving a 4th and a 6th-place finish which earned them qualification for the 2005 Copa Libertadores and 2004 Copa Sudamericana tournaments.

In his only shot at an important club, Alfaro had a disastrous spell in San Lorenzo before joining Arsenal de Sarandí in late 2006.

Alfaro helped Arsenal to two 5th-place finishes, allowing the club to qualify for the Copa Libertadores for the first time in their history. They also earned qualification for the 2007 Copa Sudamericana, where they beat Argentine champions San Lorenzo in the qualifying round to earn a place in the round of 16. In that stage, they faced the Brazilian team Goiás. Arsenal won 3–2 in Brazil and recorded a 1–1 draw in the second leg to win the tie 4–3 on aggregate, their official first victory over foreign opposition. Arsenal eventually reached the final of the competition, leaving a wake of sacked managers in their path, including Daniel Passarella, who resigned from River Plate after their defeat by Arsenal in the semi-finals.

In the final of the competition, Arsenal drew 4–4 with Mexican América, winning the title on the Away goals rule. This was the first major championship in the history of Arsenal de Sarandí and Alfaro's first major title.

At the end of the 2007–08 season, he was replaced by Daniel Garnero as manager of Arsenal. In October 2008, he was named the manager of Rosario Central. In 2009, he went to Saudi Arabia to work in Al-Ahli (Jeddah); he came with high expectations from the fans. He stayed as the coach for four months; on 20 November, he resigned for personal reasons.

On 17 May 2010, Arsenal de Sarandí confirmed that the new manager for next season would be Alfaro, who arrived along with assistant coaches Sergio Chiarelli, Carlos González, and Claudio Cristofanelli. On 24 June 2012, Alfaro would achieve his first ever league title when Arsenal won its first league title in the club's history.

The Final Tournament of 2014 looked promising for Alfaro. He had an excellent team that would play at the Copa Libertadores. By April, the team had awful results, and he announced he would leave the club by the end of June. However, he was discharged by the club and replaced by Martín Palermo.

On 2 January 2019, Boca Juniors named Gustavo Alfaro their new head coach, having his official debut on 27 January 2019, drawing 1–1 against Newell's Old Boys for the 2018–19 Super League. In the national competition, he would finish third. On 2 May, he could lift the 2018 Argentine Super Cup after playing against Rosario Central, winning a penalty shootout by 6–5 after drawing 0–0 in the ninety minutes. On 2 June, he would lose 0–2 against Club Tigre in the final of the 2019 Super League Cup in Córdoba. Beyond the title obtained, the specialised press criticised Alfaro for lacking a clear game identity in his team.

=== 2026 World Cup ===
On 29 June 2026, Alfaro led the Paraguayan national team to the round of 16 after beating Germany in the round of 32 on a penalty shootout after extra time ended 1-1 between the two teams.

== Managerial statistics ==
As of match played 17 November 2026

Managerial record by team and tenure
Team	Nat.	From	To	Record								Ref.
Team	Nat.	From	To	G	W	D	L	GF	GA	GD	Win %	Ref.
Atlético Rafaela	(Argentina)	1 July 1992	30 June 1996	126	46	47	33	164	127	+37	36.51	
Quilmes	(Argentina)	1 July 1996	30 June 1997	42	18	11	13	60	47	+13	42.86	
Atlético Rafaela	(Argentina)	1 July 1998	30 June 2000	72	31	16	25	100	85	+15	43.06	
Belgrano	(Argentina)	1 January 2001	30 June 2001	14	2	5	7	8	20	−12	14.29	
Olimpo	(Argentina)	1 July 2001	30 June 2002	24	13	7	4	36	20	+16	54.17	
Quilmes	(Argentina)	1 January 2003	23 May 2005	111	44	36	31	132	106	+26	39.64	
San Lorenzo	(Argentina)	1 July 2005	6 February 2006	22	8	5	9	35	43	−8	36.36	
Arsenal de Sarandí	(Argentina)	5 June 2006	30 June 2008	94	39	25	30	122	120	+2	41.49	
Rosario Central	(Argentina)	10 October 2008	2 March 2009	14	2	2	10	12	19	−7	14.29	
Al-Ahli	(Saudi Arabia)	22 April 2009	20 November 2009	12	4	4	4	15	15	+0	33.33	
Arsenal de Sarandí	(Argentina)	1 July 2010	15 April 2014	182	76	47	59	224	198	+26	41.76	
Tigre	(Argentina)	5 September 2014	27 November 2015	49	20	11	18	62	58	+4	40.82	
Gimnasia LP	(Argentina)	21 March 2016	30 June 2017	39	15	13	11	38	32	+6	38.46	
Huracán	(Argentina)	14 July 2017	31 December 2018	46	22	15	9	56	40	+16	47.83	
Boca Juniors	(Argentina)	1 January 2019	31 December 2019	50	27	16	7	73	28	+45	54.00	
Ecuador	(Ecuador)	26 August 2020	12 January 2023	35	12	14	9	44	35	+9	34.29	
Costa Rica	(Costa Rica)	2 November 2023	9 August 2024	11	5	2	4	16	14	+2	45.45	
Paraguay	(Paraguay)	13 August 2024	Present	28	14	8	6	36	24	+12	50.00	
Career Total				971	398	284	289	1,233	1,031	+202	40.99	

== Honours ==
=== Manager ===
Olimpo

- Primera B Nacional: 2001–02

Arsenal

- Primera División: 2012 Clausura
- Supercopa Argentina: 2012
- Copa Argentina: 2012–13
- Copa Sudamericana: 2007

Boca Juniors

- Supercopa Argentina: 2018
