= El Jagüel =

- City
- Location in Greater Buenos Aires
- Coordinates: 34°48′54″S 58°28′45″W
- Country: Argentina
- Province: Buenos Aires
- Partido: Esteban Echeverría
- Founded: 23 September 1951
- Elevation: 17 m (56 ft)

Population (2001 census [INDEC])
  - Total: 48,781
- CPA Base: B 1842
- Area code: +54 11

El Jagüel is a city in Esteban Echeverría Partido, Buenos Aires Province, Argentina. It was founded on 23 September 1951.

== Geography ==
=== Location ===
El Jagüel is located on both sides of Provincial Route 205. It borders the Ezeiza Partido, and the towns of Monte Grande and Canning.

It is crossed by the Arroyo Ortega. The area is made up mostly of workers and small and medium-sized entrepreneurs. The commercial developments are located in the central streets, next to Route 205 and on the main street of the city (called "Evita"), which extends from the eponymous railway station to Avenida Pedro Dreyer, which in turn joins the Provincial Routes 4, 52 and 58.

=== Barrios ===
- Aguaribay
- Altos de Monte Grande
- Antártica Argentina
- Barrio Grande
- Don Mariano
- El Ensueño
- El Jagüel
- El Lucero
- Barrio Nuevo
- La Campana
- La Morita
- La Sofía
- Martínez Moreno
- Montana
- San Ignacio
- Santa María
- Siglo XX

== History ==
El Jagüel was formed from the division and urbanization of land carried out by a real estate company in the 1950s. At that time, the place was an open field, with little presence of houses. In 1954, several inhabitants settled who acquired plots in the area, and built their homes with minimal comfort. There were no schools, there was no lighting, and they depended on the Monte Grande and Ezeiza train stations, the closest ones. The neighborhood was electrified in 1957, and a short time later the railway station corresponding to the Constitución-Ezeiza branch of the Roca Line was created, facilitating population growth and economic progress.
