= Gran Hermano (Argentine TV series) season 12 =

Gran Hermano
- Season 12
- Gran Hermano season 12 logo
- Presented by: Santiago del Moro
- No. of days: 205
- No. of housemates: 35
- Winner: Santiago Algorta
- Runner-up: Ulises Apóstolo
- No. of episodes: 64

Release
- Original network: Telefe
- Original release: 2 December 2024 – 24 June 2025

Season chronology
- ← Previous; Season 11 Next → Season 13

The twelfth season of the Argentine version of the television reality show Gran Hermano was announced on 3 July 2024 by Telefe, with Santiago del Moro continuing as the show's host.

The show follows a group of contestants (known as HouseGuests), who live in a house together while being constantly filmed and having no communication with the outside world as they compete to win a grand prize. Each week, the HouseGuests compete in a Head of Household (HoH) competition which gives them immunity from nominations and the power to save one of the nominees up for eviction. On eviction night, the audience votes to evict one of the nominees.

The season premiered on 2 December 2024, and concluded on 24 June 2025. It is the third continuous season to air on Telefe after making its return to the network in 2022. On 22 June 2025, Gran Hermano was renewed by Telefe for a thirteenth season.

Santiago Algorta was crowned the winner of the season, with Ulises Apóstolo finishing as runner-up and Luz Tito in third place.

== Format ==
The show follows a group of contestants, known as HouseGuests, who live inside a custom-built house outfitted with cameras and microphones recording their every move 24 hours a day. The HouseGuests are sequestered with no contact with the outside world. During their stay, the HouseGuests share their thoughts on their day-to-day lives inside the house in a private room known as the Diary Room. Each week, the HouseGuests compete in competitions to win power and safety inside the house. At the start of each week, the HouseGuests compete in a Head of Household (abbreviated as "HOH") competition. The winner of the HoH competition is immune from eviction and selects another HouseGuest to be saved for eviction. On eviction night, the audience vote to evict one of the nominees, and the nominee with the most votes is evicted from the house.

=== Format changes and additions ===
==== Head of Household Super Powers ====
Beginning this season, the HouseGuest that wins the HoH competition, gets series of Super Powers to use during the week.

Week	Head(s) of Household	Power	Chosen
1	Santiago A.	You must ban four HouseGuests from nominating.	Delfina, Jenifer, Petrona, Sandra
2	Sofía	You must nominate two HouseGuests.	Martina, Renato
2	Sofía	You must ban two HouseGuests from nominating.	Giuliano, Ulises
3	Ulises	Your votes will count as doubled.	none
3	Ulises	You must give immunity to one HouseGuest.	Brian
3	Ulises	You must nominate two HouseGuests.	Andrea, Santiago A.
5	Giuliano	You must nominate two HouseGuests.	Lourdes, Sandra
5	Giuliano	You must give immunity to one HouseGuest.	Chiara
5	Giuliano	You must evict one HouseGuest that is either nominated or not. (Note: The HouseGuest that is evicted must decide to either remain evicted or go into hiding and return to the house at the next eviction gala.)	Brian
6	Juan Pablo	You must nominate two HouseGuests.	Sandra, Brian
6	Juan Pablo	Choose one HouseGuest to have their votes count as doubled.	Chiara
6	Juan Pablo	Choose one HouseGuest to have only one vote during nominations.	Lourdes
7	Giuliano	You must nominate two HouseGuests.	Santiago A., Brian
7	Giuliano	Choose three HouseGuests to have the power to nominate three HouseGuests for eviction.	Juan Pablo, Sofía, Ulises
8	Santiago A.	You must nominate two HouseGuests	Giuliano, Juan Pablo
8	Santiago A.	You must ban one HouseGuest to compete in next weeks Head of Household competition.	Juan Pablo
10	Claudio	You must nominate one HouseGuest.	Santiago A.
10	Claudio	Your vote will count as doubled.	none
11	Lourdes	You must nominate two HouseGuests. (Note: The HoH must choose one original HouseGuest & one new HouseGuest to nominate.)	Luz, Selva
12	Sandra	Out of the 10 HouseGuests who were not safe, you must choose three HouseGuests to compete in a trivia challenge for safety.	Luciana, Katia, Juan Pablo
13	Chiara	You must nominate two HouseGuests.	~~Juan Pablo~~, ~~Katia~~
13	Chiara	Your vote will count as doubled.	none
15	Claudio	You must nominate two HouseGuests.	Marcelo, Ulises
16	Juliana	You must nominate one HouseGuest.	Chiara
17	Ulises	You must nominate one HouseGuest.	Lourdes
17	Ulises	You must give a HouseGuest two extra points to use during Nominations.	Chiara
19	Santiago A.	You must nominate one HouseGuest.	Ulises
20	~~Gabriela~~; Catalina	You must nominate one HouseGuest.	~~Luz~~; Luz
24	Santiago A.	You must give a HouseGuest two extra points to use during Nominations.	Luz
25	Ulises	You must choose one HouseGuest to have dinner with you. (Note: The HoH and the individual who is chosen will watch all the nominations.)	Eugenia
27	Juan Pablo	You must give a HouseGuest two extra points to use during Nominations.	Eugenia

==== The voided votes ====
From week 2 onwards, the last evicted HouseGuest has the power to void any of the remaining HouseGuests' votes before they nominate in the Nominations Gala.

==== The Kiosk ====
This season, Gran Hermano installed a kiosk where HouseGuests use for special prizes every week.

==== Red Phone ====
Starting in Week 6, Gran Hermano enabled the red phone. Whoever answered the phone would receive positive or negative information. The HouseGuests must answer the phone without being able to repeat it during the day and if the phone is not answered before five rings the whole house would be punished.

Week	Call	Message	Answered by	Chosen
6	1	You can have a banquet with eight of your fellow HouseGuests or nominate two HouseGuests. (Note: Santiago A. chose to nominate two HouseGuests.)	Santiago A.	Sofía, Chiara
7	2	You must pick seven HouseGuests. (Note: The seven HouseGuests along with the person who answered the red phone will nominate face to face.)	Chiara	Sandra, Luz, Petrona, Claudio, Santiago A., Carlos, Luciana
13	3	You must take three keys from the car challenge from four HouseGuests and give them to four other HouseGuests.	Santiago A.	Takes from: Chiara, Juan Pablo, Katia, Ulises; Gives to: Luciana, Luz, Martina, Sandra
14	4	You must nominate two HouseGuests for eviction and give another HouseGuest the same power. (Note: The HouseGuests that are nominated are eligible to be saved by the Head of Household.)	Juan Pablo	Nominates: Santiago A., Luciana; Nominator: Lourdes; Nominates: Santiago L., Lorenzo
16	5	You must nominate one HouseGuest. (Note: Both the nominator and nominee will both have dinner alone.)	Luciana	Eugenia
18	6	You are the Head of Household.	Gabriela	none
21	7	You must choose two people (HouseGuest or visitor) to spend a night alone.	Juan Pablo	Gabriella, Guillermo

==== Repechage ====
In Week 6, after Andrea walked from the game for health reasons, it was announced that a repechage would take place among the first seven evictees during Week 7. As Keila was ejected from the game, she was ineligible to take part in the repechage. In Week 9, it was announced that the second repechage would take place during Week 10. The second repechage had two stages with the three HouseGuests with the most votes from the public were eligible for re-entry. The HouseGuest with the most votes automatically returned to the house, while the HouseGuests who finished second and third faced a house vote for a final spot. As Keila was ejected and Andrea left for health reasons, they were both ineligible to take part in the second repechage, and Petrona (who was evicted in Week 9) declined to take part in the second repechage.

==== The Golden Ticket ====
As a result of Luca's ejection on Day 85, it was announced on that same day that the Golden Ticket returned. It would give one person (from the previously evicted HouseGuests or contestants from previous seasons) a chance enter the house to replace Luca. On Day 87, it was announced that a second Golden Ticket would be given to another former HouseGuest out of the 32 former HouseGuests that chose to participate.

On Day 115, Juliana walked from the game and therefore another Golden Ticket was given to a former HouseGuest chosen by Gran Hermano. One day later, it was announced that Catalina Gorostidi (former season 11 HouseGuest) would return to the house.

== HouseGuests ==
A total of 24 HouseGuests moved into the house on Day 1 (2 December 2024), making it the season with the highest number of newcomers that join the house in the first episode. Former evicted HouseGuest Brian Alberto returned to the house on Day 35 (5 January 2025), and on Day 36 (6 January 2025) it was announced that new HouseGuest Katia Fenocchio would enter the house as a replacement. Other evicted HouseGuests Jenifer Lauría and Luca Figurelli returned to the house on Day 43 (13 January 2025) and Day 64 (3 February 2025), respectively.

Due to a repechage during Week 10, Renato Rossini, Giuliano Vaschetto and Delfina De Lellis re-entered the house on Days 65 (4 February), 67 (6 February) and 71 (10 February 2025), respectively, while another eight new HouseGuests (Eugenia Ruiz, Gabriela Gianatassio, Lorenzo De Zuani, Lucía Patrone, Marcelo Carro, Saif Al Sayedd, Santiago Larrivey and Selva Pérez) entered the house on Day 71 (10 February 2025). On Day 99 (10 March 2025), Claudio Di Lorenzo (previously walked from the house due to medical reasons) and Juliana Scaglione (former season 11 contestant) received the most votes and re-entered the house via Golden Ticket.

Name	Age	Occupation	Residence	Day entered	Day exited	Status
Santiago Algorta	28	Influencer	Montevideo, Uruguay	1	205	Winner
Ulises Apóstolo	26	Political sciences licentiate	Córdoba, Córdoba	1	205	Runner-up
Luz Tito	22	Booking office employee	San Salvador de Jujuy, Jujuy	1	205	Third place
Eugenia Ruiz	44	Doctor	Santiago del Estero, Santiago del Estero	71	204	Fourth place
Selva Pérez	51	Housewife	Montevideo, Uruguay	71	199	Evicted
Juan Pablo De Vigili	38	Architect	Corrientes, Corrientes	1	197	Evicted
Katia Fenocchio	32	Delivery worker	La Matanza, Buenos Aires	36	190	Evicted
Sandra Priore	50	Fisherwoman	La Plata, Buenos Aires	1	183	Evicted
Lourdes Ciccarone	22	Model	Mar del Plata, Buenos Aires	1	176	Evicted
Lucía Patrone	18	Model	Villa Devoto, Buenos Aires	71	169	Evicted
Gabriela Gianatassio	28	Medical student	Torres, Brazil	71	161	Evicted
Chiara Mancuso	30	Model	Canning, Buenos Aires	1	155	Evicted
Catalina Gorostidi	32	Pediatrician	Santa Fe, Santa Fe	116	140	Evicted
Martina Pereyra	24	Accountant	La Plata, Buenos Aires	1	133	Evicted
Claudio Di Lorenzo	41	Reiki practitioner	Flores, Buenos Aires	1	70	Walked
Claudio Di Lorenzo	41	Reiki practitioner	Flores, Buenos Aires	99	126	Evicted
Santiago Larrivey	33	Accountant	La Plata, Buenos Aires	71	120	Evicted
Juliana Scaglione	34	Sportswoman	Belgrano, Buenos Aires	99	115	Walked
Luciana Martínez	32	Dance teacher	Pico Truncado, Santa Cruz	1	113	Evicted
Lorenzo De Zuani	23	Industrial design student	Salta, Salta	71	105	Evicted
Marcelo Carro	34	Logistics manager	Lanús, Buenos Aires	71	105	Evicted
Renato Rossini	27	Marketing student	Lima, Perú	1	14	Evicted
Renato Rossini	27	Marketing student	Lima, Perú	65	92	Evicted
Luca Figurelli	18	Football player	Berazategui, Buenos Aires	1	35	Evicted
Luca Figurelli	18	Football player	Berazategui, Buenos Aires	64	85	Ejected
Delfina De Lellis	18	Model	Sáenz Peña, Buenos Aires	1	8	Evicted
Delfina De Lellis	18	Model	Sáenz Peña, Buenos Aires	71	84	Evicted
Saif Al Sayedd	20	Dentistry student	Cairo, Egypt	71	84	Evicted
Brian Alberto	28	Hawker	San Miguel, Buenos Aires	1	32	Evicted
Brian Alberto	28	Hawker	San Miguel, Buenos Aires	35	77	Evicted
Giuliano Vaschetto	33	Salesman	Venado Tuerto, Santa Fe	1	56	Evicted
Giuliano Vaschetto	33	Salesman	Venado Tuerto, Santa Fe	67	70	Evicted
Jenifer Lauría	32	Trade union employee	Canning, Buenos Aires	1	21	Evicted
Jenifer Lauría	32	Trade union employee	Canning, Buenos Aires	43	67	Ejected
Sofía Buscio	32	Ridehailing service driver	Villa Urquiza, Buenos Aires	1	63	Evicted
Petrona Jerez	53	Nurse	San Miguel de Tucumán, Tucumán	1	59	Evicted
Carlos Tocco	63	Football coach	Ituzaingó, Buenos Aires	1	49	Evicted
Sebastián Bello	23	Engineering student	San Rafael, Mendoza	1	42	Evicted
Andrea Lázaro	42	Gymnastics teacher	San Cristóbal, Buenos Aires	1	38	Walked
Keila Sosa	28	Unemployed	Tigre, Buenos Aires	1	32	Ejected
Ezequiel Ois	24	Tennis instructor	Ramos Mejía, Buenos Aires	1	28	Evicted
Candela Campos	24	Teacher	Villa Luzuriaga, Buenos Aires	1	28	Evicted

=== Relatives ===
On Day 141 (22 April 2025), relatives from each one of the twelve remaining HouseGuests that were in competition at the time entered the house.

Name	Age	Occupation	Relationship	Day entered	Day exited	Status
Pablo Atkinson	37	Actor	Selva's friend	141	154	Winner
María Ruiz	40	Plastic surgeon	Eugenia's sister	141	151	Evicted
Alberto Murcia	25	Digital marketing	Luz's boyfriend	141	150	Evicted
Augusto Camao	30	Online community manager	Santiago A.'s friend	141	149	Evicted
Giovanni Mancuso	18	Football player	Chiara's brother	141	148	Evicted
Ariel Albornóz	27	Unemployed	Ulises's friend	141	147	Evicted
Cecilia De Vigili	41	Entrepreneur	Juan Pablo's sister	141	147	Evicted
Lucas Paletta	48	Fisherman	Sandra's husband	141	147	Evicted
Gisela Melisa	40	Unemployed	Katia's cousin	141	146	Walked
Guillermo Gianatassio	33	Unemployed	Gabriela's brother	141	144	Evicted
Cecilia Bragado	54	Housewife	Lourdes's mother	141	143	Evicted
Melina Blan	47	Housewife	Lucía's mother	141	143	Evicted

== Episodes ==
No. overall	No. in season	Title	Day(s)	Original release date	HH rating (Note: Audience averages are measured only in the Greater Buenos Aires area, according to data from Kantar Ibope Media.)
Week 1
379	1	"Premiere"	Day 1	2 December 2024	17.5
Twenty-four HouseGuests were presented to the public and entered the house on Day 1.
380	2	"1st Nomination Gala"	Days 1–3	4 December 2024	13.7
After winning the HoH competition on Day 2, Santiago A. banned Delfina, Jenifer, Petrona and Sandra from nominating this week. On Day 3, Carlos, Delfina, Luciana and Ulises were nominated.
381	3	"1st Eviction Gala"	Days 4–8	9 December 2024	14.7
On Day 4, Santiago A. decided to save Luciana from eviction, and nominated Claudio instead. On Day 8, Carlos and Claudio were saved by the public, and Delfina became the first evicted after facing Ulises.
Week 2
382	4	"2nd Nomination Gala"	Days 9–10	11 December 2024	12.8 (part 1) 10.3 (part 2)
On Day 10, Sofía won the HoH competition and decided to ban Giuliano and Ulises from nominating, and nominated Martina and Renato for eviction. In the Nomination Gala on Day 11, Luciana, Luz, Santiago A. and Ulises were also nominated.
383	5	"2nd Eviction Gala"	Days 11–14	15 December 2024	12.7 (part 1) 11.4 (part 2)
Sofía decides to save Luz and put Keila up for eviction on Day 11. During the Eviction Gala on Day 14, Keila, Luciana, Martina and Ulises were saved by the audience with the fewest votes. Renato was faced against Santiago A. and was finally evicted with a percentage record of 92.3% of negative votes.
Week 3
384	6	"3rd Nomination Gala"	Days 15–17	18 December 2024	11.9 (part 1) 9.9 (part 2)
On Day 15, Ulises won the HoH competition and was awarded to double his nomination votes, the right to give one HouseGuest immunity from the next eviction, and the right to nominate two HouseGuests' without the possibility of being saved. Renato chose to void Andrea's votes, Brian was nominated as punishment for opening a kiosk box without permission and Ulises chose to give immunity to Giuliano and nominate Andrea and Santiago A. up for eviction. On Day 17, Chiara, Jenifer, Luciana, Luz and Sandra were also nominated by the HouseGuests.
385	7	"3rd Eviction Gala"	Days 18–21	22 December 2024	12.1 (part 1) 10.3 (part 2)
On Day 18, Ulises decided to save Sandra and nominate Martina, but it was later nulled as he previously discussed his votes with other HouseGuests. On Day 21, Andrea, Brian, Luciana, Sandra, Santiago A. and Chiara were saved by the public, and Jenifer was finally evicted after being faced against Luz.
Week 4
386	8	"4th Eviction Gala (Part 1)"	Days 22–25	26 December 2024	11.8 (part 1) 10.9 (part 2)
As Luca won the HoH competition on Day 22, he won immunity for the week's eviction. On Day 23, while competing for the weekly budget, all of the HouseGuests chose to abandon it, and were punished by Gran Hermano who decided to modify the eviction gala and eliminate two HouseGuests this week in a positive voting nomination in which all would be up for eviction. Andrea, Brian, Chiara, Lourdes, Luciana, Luz, Petrona, Sandra, Santiago A. and Ulises were the first HouseGuests to be saved with the most positive votes on Day 25.
387	9	"4th Eviction Gala (Part 2)"	Days 26–28	29 December 2024	12.3 (part 1) 11.2 (part 2)
The remaining HouseGuests that were not previously saved continued to be up for eviction, with Candela and Ezequiel being evicted on Day 28 after receiving the fewest votes to be saved.
Week 5
388	10	"4th Nomination Gala"	Days 29–31	1 January 2025	10.3 (part 1) 8.9 (part 2)
After winning the HoH competition on Day 29, Giuliano gave immunity to Chiara and nominated Lourdes and Sandra without the possibility of being saved, and Jenifer voided Sandra's votes. On Day 31, Andrea, Brian, Juan Pablo and Luca were nominated.
389	11	"5th Eviction Gala"	Days 32–35	5 January 2025	14.5 (part 1) 11.4 (part 2)
On Day 32, Gran Hermano decided to eject Keila from the house due to several complains about the production, the house and the format. On the same date, during the debate, Giuliano had to evict one HouseGuest, whom had to choose to either remain evicted or head into hiding and return to the house at the next eviction gala; Giuliano chose Brian to evict. Brian decided to enter hiding and return at the eviction gala on Day 35. Giuliano also saved Juan Pablo from eviction and nominated Petrona. Three days later, Luca was finally evicted by the public vote.
Week 6
390	12	"5th Nomination Gala"	Days 36–38	8 January 2025	12.4 (part 1) 11.0 (part 2)
On Day 36, Juan Pablo won the HoH competition and was awarded to nominate two HouseGuests without the possibility of being saved, chosoe a HouseGuest to double their votes and choose another HouseGuest to only cast one vote during the nominations. Juan Pablo nominated Sandra and Brian, doubled Chiara's votes and allowed Lourdes to only cast one vote. On Day 38, Andrea decided walk from the game due to health reasons. Carlos, Claudio, Lourdes, Martina, Sandra, Santiago A. and Sofía's votes towards Chiara, Giuliano, Luciana, Petrona and Ulises were voided due to previously discussing nominations. Santiago A. answered the Red Phone and chose Sofía and Chiara to face eviction. Giuliano, Lourdes, Luciana, Martina and Sebastián were also nominated.
391	13	"6th Eviction Gala"	Days 39–42	12 January 2025	11.4 (part 1) 10.8 (part 2)
On Day 39, Juan Pablo's choice of saving Sofía and nominate Santiago A. was nulled as a punishment for discussing his choices on the previous days. During the eviction gala on Day 42, Sebastián was finally evicted with the fewest votes as the public were voting to save rather than evict during this week.
Week 7
392	13	"6th Nomination Gala"	Days 43–45	15 January 2025	11.8 (part 1) 10.1 (part 2)
After winning the HoH competition on Day 43, Giuliano won the right to nominate two HouseGuests without the possibility of being saved, choosing Brian and Santiago A. He also chose three HouseGuests to have the power to nominate three HouseGuests instead of two, choosing Juan Pablo, Sofía, and Ulises. Chiara answered the Red Phone and picked seven HouseGuests unaware that they would nominate face to face this week with her, choosing Carlos, Claudio, Luciana, Luz, Petrona and Sandra. Andrea left the house due to medical reasons and a repechage took place among the previous evictees, with Jenifer receiving the most votes to return. On Day 45, Brian, Carlos, Chiara, Jenifer, Juan Pablo, Lourdes, Martina and Santiago A. were nominated.
393	14	"7th Eviction Gala"	Days 46–49	19 January 2025	11.6 (part 1) 10.8 (part 2)
On Day 49, Brian, Carlos, Chiara, Jenifer, Lourdes, Martina and Santiago A. were saved by the public, and Carlos became evicted after facing Juan Pablo.
Week 8
394	15	"7th Nomination Gala"	Days 50–52	22 January 2025	10.5 (part 1) 8.9 (part 2)
On Day 50, Santiago A. won the HoH competition and decided to ban Juan Pablo for the next week's HoH competition, and nominated Giuliano and Juan Pablo without the possibility of being saved. Luciana and Luz were both nominated as a punishment for moving and making noise during The Freeze and Jenifer due to sharing information from the outside world. The HouseGuests that nominated in the diary room during the previous week, had to nominate face to face this week. In the Nomination Gala on Day 52, Brian, Claudio, Jenifer, Katia and Ulises were also nominated.
395	16	"8th Eviction Gala"	Days 53–56	26 January 2025	10.8 (part 1) 10.8 (part 2)
Santiago A. decided to save Katia and put Chiara up for eviction on Day 53. During the Eviction Gala on Day 56, Brian, Ulises, Luciana, Chiara, Jenifer, Claudio and Juan Pablo were saved by the audience with the fewest votes. Giuliano was faced against Luz and was finally evicted.
Week 9
396	17	"9th Eviction Gala"	Days 57–59	29 January 2025	11.7 (part 1) 9.6 (part 2)
On Day 57, Claudio won the HoH competition and was awarded to be immune as all HouseGuests would face the public vote with a double eviction. On Day 59, Petrona was evicted as she received the fewest votes.
397	18	"10th Eviction Gala"	Days 60–63	2 February 2025	11.9 (part 1) 10.0 (part 2)
Due to speaking and moving during The Freeze, Brian was punished by being permanently nominated until the end of his stay in the house. On Day 63, Sofía was evicted as she received the fewest votes.
Week 10
398	19	"8th Nomination Gala"	Days 64–66	5 February 2025	13.9 (part 1) 11.4 (part 2)
On Day 64, the public had to vote for three ex-HouseGuests to be eligible for re-entry into the house, with Luca receiving the most votes from the public and therefore re-entering the house. Giuliano and Renato received the second and third most votes from the public and were put to face a house vote. On Day 65, HouseGuests voted for Renato to re-enter the house. On Day 66, Giuliano voided Chiara's votes and Petrona voided Santiago A. votes. As HoH, Claudio had votes count as doubled and nominated Santiago A. without the possibility of being saved. Brian, Juan Pablo, Katia, Sandra and Ulises were also nominated.
399	20	"11th Eviction Gala"	Days 67–70	9 February 2025	13.8 (part 1) 12.4 (part 2)
On Day 67, Jenifer was ejected by Gran Hermano as she continued to share information from the outside world, with Giuliano replacing her as a new HouseGuest, who was also nominated as punishment also for sharing information from the outside world. Claudio leaves the house on Day 70 due to health issues and is replaced by Delfina. Giuliano is finally re-evicted after facing Brian, leaving Santiago A., Katia, Sandra, Ulises and Juan Pablo safe.
Week 11
400	21	"HouseGuests Entry Gala"	Day 71	10 February 2025	14.9 (part 1) 11.0 (part 2)
Eight new HouseGuests were presented to the public and entered the house on Day 71.
401	22	"9th Nomination Gala"	Days 72–73	12 February 2025	14.4 (part 1) 11.7 (part 2)
Lourdes won the HoH competition and nominated Luz and Selva without the possibility of being saved. Luca and Renato were also nominated without the possibility of being saved as punishment for sharing information from the outside world. On Day 73, Delfina, Eugenia, Luz, Marcelo and Saif were also nominated.
402	23	"12th Eviction Gala"	Days 74–77	16 February 2025	14.9 (part 1) 13.8 (part 2)
On Day 74, Lourdes saved Saif and nominated Ulises instead. Two days later, Marcelo, Eugenia, Selva, Ulises, Renato, Delfina and Luca were saved, and Brian was evicted after facing Luz.
Week 12
403	24	"13th Eviction Gala (Part 1)"	Days 78–80	19 February 2025	13.2 (part 1) 10.4 (part 2)
It was announced that this week there would be no nominations and instead all HouseGuests (except Sandra who won the HoH competition) would face the public vote on a double eviction. On Day 80, the 10 HouseGuests with the most votes were safe while the others continued to face the nomination.
404	25	"13th Eviction Gala (Part 2)"	Days 81–84	23 February 2025	13.4 (part 1) 11.7 (part 2)
As Katia won a trivia challenge, she became safe from eviction. On Day 84, Luciana, Juan Pablo, Santiago L., Lorenzo, Gabriela and Lucía were saved from eviction. Saif and Delfina were finally evicted after facing Marcelo.
Week 13
405	26	"10th Nomination Gala"	Days 85–87	26 February 2025	14.9 (part 1) 10.4 (part 2)
On Day 85, Chiara won the HoH competition and was awarded to double her votes during the nomination, choosing Juan Pablo and Katia without the possibility of being saved. Luca was ejected by Gran Hermano as he continued to share information from the outside. Renato and Sandra were nominated for receiving information from the outside world, and for the same reason Chiara lost her right to save a HouseGuest from nomination and got her votes voided. On Day 87, Eugenia, Gabriela, Juan Pablo and Katia were nominated.
406	27	"14th Eviction Gala"	Days 88–92	3 March 2025	14.0 (part 1) 12.5 (part 2)
On Day 92, Sandra, Eugenia, Juan Pablo and Gabriela were saved from eviction while Renato was evicted after facing Katia.
Week 14
407	28	"HouseGuests Re-Entry Gala (Part 1)"	Days 93–98	9 March 2025	14.0 (part 1) 10.6 (part 2)
Due to Luca's ejection on Day 85, two former HouseGuests (from the previously evicted ones or contestants from previous seasons) would receive a Golden Ticket to enter the house to replace him. 22 out of the 32 former contestants were eliminated from the competition for receiving the least percentage of votes.
408	29	"HouseGuests Re-Entry Gala (Part 2)"	Day 99	10 March 2025	16.7 (part 1) 12.6 (part 2)
On Day 99, Claudio (previously walked from the house) and Juliana (former season 11 contestant) received the most votes and re-entered the house.
Week 15
407	28	"11th Nomination Gala"	Days 100–101	12 March 2025	13.2 (part 1) 10.0 (part 2)
408	29	"15th Eviction Gala"	Days 102–105	16 March 2025	15.1 (part 1) 12.2 (part 2)
Week 16
409	30	"12th Nomination Gala"	Days 106–108	19 March 2025	13.6 (part 1) 10.2 (part 2)
410	31	"16th Eviction Gala"	Days 109–113	24 March 2025	15.8 (part 1) 13.5 (part 2)
Week 17
411	32	"13th Nomination Gala"	Days 114–115	26 March 2025	16.4 (part 1) 13.8 (part 2)
412	33	"17th Eviction Gala (Part 1)"	Days 116–119	30 March 2025	14.2 (part 1) 11.8 (part 2)
413	34	"17th Eviction Gala (Part 2)"	Day 120	31 March 2025	16.0 (part 1) 14.6 (part 2)
Week 18
414	35	"18th Eviction Gala"	Days 121–126	6 April 2025	12.7
Week 19
415	36	"14th Nomination Gala"	Days 127–129	9 April 2025	15.0 (part 1) 12.7 (part 2)
416	37	"19th Eviction Gala"	Days 130–133	13 April 2025	14.3 (part 1) 12.5 (part 2)
Week 20
417	38	"15th Nomination Gala"	Days 134–136	16 April 2025	15.1 (part 1) 12.3 (part 2)
418	39	"20th Eviction Gala"	Days 137–140	20 April 2025	15.3 (part 1) 13.1 (part 2)
Week 21
419	40	"Visitors Entry Gala"	Day 141	21 April 2025	17.5 (part 1) 14.1 (part 2)
Relatives from each one of the 12 remaining HouseGuests that were in competition at the time entered the house to compete with their relatives.
420	41	"Visitors' 1st Evicion Gala"	Days 141–143	23 April 2025	14.9 (part 1) 11.6 (part 2)
As there were no nominations this week, all visitors except Alberto (who won the HoH competition) faced the public vote. Melina (Lucía's mother) and Cecilia B. (Lourdes's mother) were evicted with the fewest votes.
421	42	"Visitors' 2nd Eviction Gala"	Days 144–147	27 April 2025	15.0 (part 1) 12.5 (part 2)
After discussing about the outside world, Alberto was dethroned as HoH and therefore was eligible to be evicted along with the other visitors, with Santiago A. becoming the new HoH. On Day 146, Gisela (Katia's cousin) decided to leave the house. On Day 147, Ariel (Ulises's friend), Cecilia V. (Juan Pablo's sister) and Lucas (Sandra's husband) were finally evicted after receiving the fewest votes to be saved.
Week 22
422	43	"16th Nomination Gala"	Days 148–150	30 April 2025	14.2 (part 1) 12.1 (part 2)
423	44	"21st Eviction Gala (Part 1)"	Days 151–154	4 May 2025	15.0 (part 1) 12.6 (part 2)
424	45	"21st Eviction Gala (Part 2)"	Day 155	5 May 2025	16.8 (part 1) 12.7 (part 2)
Week 23
425	46	"22nd Eviction Gala"	Days 156–161	11 May 2025	14.7 (part 1) 12.3 (part 2)
Week 24
426	47	"17th Nomination Gala"	Days 162–163	13 May 2025	14.8 (part 1) 12.0 (part 2)
427	48	"23rd Eviction Gala (Part 1)"	Days 164–168	18 May 2025	14.0 (part 1) 12.6 (part 2)
428	49	"23rd Eviction Gala (Part 2)"	Day 169	19 May 2025	13.0 (part 1) 11.9 (part 2)
Week 25
429	50	"18th Nomination Gala"	Days 170–171	21 May 2025	14.5 (part 1) 11.6 (part 2)
430	51	"24th Eviction Gala (Part 1)"	Days 172–175	25 May 2025	14.0 (part 1) 11.7 (part 2)
431	52	"24th Eviction Gala (Part 2)"	Day 176	26 May 2025	16.7 (part 1) 13.6 (part 2)
Week 26
432	53	"Special Gala"	Days 177–178	28 May 2025	14.1 (part 1) 10.2 (part 2)
Former evicted HouseGuests Andrea, Chiara, Giuliano, Jenifer, Luciana, Martina, Petrona and Santiago L. entered the house to partner and vote with the current HouseGuests during the following week.
433	54	"19th Nomination Gala"	Day 179	29 May 2025	13.2 (part 1) 10.2 (part 2)
434	55	"25th Eviction Gala (Part 1)"	Days 180–182	1 June 2025	13.2 (part 1) 11.2 (part 2)
435	56	"25th Eviction Gala (Part 2)"	Day 183	2 June 2025	15.5 (part 1) 11.1 (part 2)
Week 27
436	57	"20th Nomination Gala"	Days 184–185	4 June 2025	13.9 (part 1) 10.2 (part 2)
437	58	"26th Eviction Gala (Part 1)"	Days 186–189	8 June 2025	12.6 (part 1) 11.0 (part 2)
438	59	"26th Eviction Gala (Part 2)"	Day 190	9 June 2025	14.6 (part 1) 12.1 (part 2)
Week 28
439	60	"21st Nomination Gala"	Days 191–192	11 June 2025	13.9 (part 1) 11.6 (part 2)
440	61	"27th Eviction Gala"	Days 193–197	16 June 2025	17.0 (part 1) 13.5 (part 2)
Week 29
441	62	"28th Eviction Gala"	Days 198–199	18 June 2025	14.8 (part 1) 10.9 (part 2)
Week 30
442	63	"29th Eviction Gala"	Days 200–204	23 June 2025	17.8 (part 1) 13.9 (part 2)
On Day 204, Eugenia was evicted from the house, with Luz, Santiago A. and Ulises becoming finalists.
443	64	"Final Gala"	Day 205 Various (Note: In the final episode, the HouseGuests that made it to the finale looked back over their time in the house. Flashbacks include clips from previous days in the house.)	24 June 2025	19.8 (part 1) 15.3 (part 2)
After 205 days, Santiago A. was crowned the winner of the season, with Ulises as the runner-up and Luz in third place.

== Voting history ==
HouseGuests nominate for two and one points, shown in descending order in the nomination box. The four or more HouseGuests with the most nomination points face the public vote.

HouseGuests can also use the Diary Room's Special Nomination, which gives three and two points instead.

From week 2 onwards, the last evicted HouseGuest has the power to void any one's nominations before they nominate in the Nominations Gala.

Starting in Week 23, the Power Nomination (fulminante in Spanish) was enabled by Gran Hermano, which consists of the automatic nomination of a HouseGuest, without the ability to be saved by the Head of Household. It could only be used once by each HouseGuest throughout those weeks. HouseGuests that use the Power Nomination are marked in bold.

Color key:

Winner
Runner-up
Other finalists
Head of Household
Nominated for eviction
Immune from eviction
Not eligible to vote
Special Nomination
Evicted
Ejected by Gran Hermano
Walked

Voting history (season 12)
	Week 1	Week 2	Week 3	Week 4	Week 5	Week 6	Week 7		Week 8	Week 9	Week 10			Week 11	Week 12	Week 13	Week 14	Week 15	Week 16	Week 17	Week 18	Week 19	Week 20	Week 21			Week 22				Week 23	Week 24	Week 25	Week 26	Week 27		Week 28	Week 29		Week 30	Nomination points received
	Week 1	Week 2	Week 3	Week 4	Week 5	Week 6	Day 43	Day 45	Week 8	Week 9	Day 64	Day 65	Day 66	Week 11	Week 12	Week 13	Week 14	Week 15	Week 16	Week 17	Week 18	Week 19	Week 20	Day 142	Day 143	Day 144	Day 148	Day 149	Day 150		Week 23	Week 24	Week 25	Week 26	Day 183	Day 185	Week 28	Day 197	Day 199	Finale	Nomination points received
Head(s) of Household	Santiago A.	Sofía	Ulises	Luca	Giuliano	Juan Pablo	none	Giuliano	Santiago A.	Claudio	none		Claudio	Lourdes	Sandra	Chiara	Ulises	Claudio	Juliana	Ulises	Gabriela	Santiago A.	~~Gabriela~~; ~~Catalina~~; Santiago A.	Alberto		Santiago A.	none			Selva	Juan Pablo	Santiago A.	Ulises	Santiago A.	none	Juan Pablo	Ulises	none			Nomination points received
Votes Voided	none	Andrea	Andrea	none	Brian; Keila; Sandra	Giuliano	none	Lourdes	Martina	none			Chiara; Sandra; Santiago A.	Luz	none	Luciana; Santiago A. Ulises	none	Sandra	Lourdes, Luciana	Chiara	none	Santiago A. Chiara	Catalina	none					none	Eugenia	none	Santiago A. Luz	Ulises	Luz	none	Eugenia	Eugenia	none			Nomination points received
Santiago A.	Ulises, Jenifer	Jenifer, Ulises	Jenifer, Chiara	No nominations	Carlos, Juan Pablo	~~Chiara~~, ~~Giuliano~~	No nominations	Claudio, Juan Pablo	Brian, Sofía	No nominations	No nominations	Giuliano	~~Jenifer~~, ~~Juan Pablo~~	Santiago A., Marcelo	No nominations	~~Katia~~, ~~Juan Pablo~~	No nominations	Juan Pablo, Gabriela	Santiago L., Gabriela	Selva, Eugenia	No nominations	~~Catalina~~, ~~Eugenia~~	Lourdes, Juan Pablo	No nominations	No nominations	Head of Household	No; Nominations	Pablo	No; Nominations	Lourdes, Gabriela	No; Nominations	~~Ulises~~, ~~Selva~~	Lourdes, Katia	Ulises, Selva	No nominations	Eugenia, Katia	Selva, Ulises	No nominations	No nominations	**Winner** (Day 205)	23
Ulises	Petrona, Delfina	Banned	Luz (4), Luciana (2)	No nominations	Luca, Martina	Luciana, Santiago A.	No nominations	Martina, Lourdes, Luciana	Katia, Petrona	No nominations	No nominations	Giuliano	Katia, Juan Pablo	Saif, Marcelo	No nominations	~~Lourdes~~, ~~Martina~~	Head of Household	Luz, Juan Pablo	Selva, Santiago L.	Santiago A., Selva	No nominations	Luz, Katia	Chiara, Lourdes	No nominations	No nominations	No nominations	No; Nominations	Alberto	No; Nominations	Luz, Katia	No; Nominations	Luz, Juan Pablo	~~Santiago A.~~, ~~Sandra~~	Juan Pablo, Sandra	No nominations	Juan Pablo, Katia	Juan Pablo (4), Selva (2)	No nominations	No nominations	**Runner-up** (Day 205)	57
Luz	Jenifer, Chiara	Ulises, Petrona	Jenifer, Sandra	No nominations	Brian, Carlos	Sofía, Carlos	No nominations	Juan Pablo, Carlos	Claudio, Sofía	No nominations	No nominations	Renato	Juan Pablo, ~~Jenifer~~	~~Katia~~, ~~Delfina~~	No nominations	Gabriela, Katia	No nominations	Katia, Gabriela	Lourdes, Santiago L.	Selva, Juan Pablo	No nominations	Selva, Gabriela	Eugenia, Katia	No nominations	No nominations	No nominations	No; Nominations	Pablo	No; Nominations	Gabriela, Juan Pablo	No; Nominations	~~Lourdes (3)~~, ~~Selva (2)~~	Selva, Lourdes	~~Sandra~~, ~~Ulises~~	No nominations	Juan Pablo, Ulises	Selva, Santiago A.	No nominations	No nominations	**Third place** (Day 205)	69
Eugenia	Not in House													Luciana, Santiago A.	No nominations	Katia, Lourdes	No nominations	Lucía, Katia	Gabriela, Luciana	Gabriela, Lucía	No nominations	Sandra, Gabriela	Lourdes, Chiara	No nominations	No nominations	No nominations	No; Nominations	Augusto	No; Nominations	~~Sandra~~, ~~Lourdes~~	No; Nominations	Luz, Katia	Katia, Santiago A.	**Katia**	No nominations	~~Luz (3)~~, ~~Katia (2)~~	~~Ulises~~, ~~Juan Pablo~~	No nominations	No nominations	**Fourth place** (Day 204)	47
Selva	Not in House													Saif, Eugenia	No nominations	Katia, Martina	No nominations	Lucía, Martinia	Juan Pablo, Lourdes	Santiago A., Juan Pablo	No nominations	Gabriela, Juan Pablo	Chiara, Lourdes	No nominations	No nominations	No nominations	No; Nominations	Augusto	No; Nominations	Sandra, Lourdes	No; Nominations	Lucía, Luz	Katia, Sandra	Sandra (4), Luz (2)	No nominations	Katia, Luz	Luz, Juan Pablo	No nominations	Evicted (Day 199)		45
Juan Pablo	Luciana, Lourdes	Santiago A., Andrea	Luz, Sandra	No nominations	Luca, Andrea	Lourdes, Sebastián	No nominations	Martina, Luz, Lourdes	Luz, Martina	No nominations	No nominations	Renato	Ulises, Lourdes	Chiara, Marcelo	No nominations	Lucía, Marcelo	No nominations	Juliana, Selva	Luciana, Sandra	Selva, Santiago A.	No nominations	Gabriela, Selva	Chiara, Sandra	No nominations	No nominations	No nominations	No; Nominations	Augusto	No; Nominations	Katia, Lourdes	Head of Household	Luz, Ulises	Luz, Santiago A.	Sandra, Luz	No nominations	Ulises (4), Katia (2)	Ulises, Santiago A.	Evicted (Day 197)			82
Katia	Not in House					Sebastián, Martina	No nominations	Carlos, Chiara	Claudio, Chiara	No nominations	No nominations	Renato	~~Chiara~~, Sandra	Eugenia, Chiara	No nominations	Eugenia, Lucía	No nominations	Gabriela, Eugenia	Luz, Gabriela	Martina, Santiago A.	No nominations	Gabriela, Juan Pablo	Lourdes, Chiara	No nominations	No nominations	No nominations	No; Nominations	María	No; Nominations	Juan Pablo, Lucía	No; Nominations	Juan Pablo, Luz	**Juan Pablo**	Juan Pablo, Selva	No nominations	Eugenia	Evicted (Day 190)				74
Sandra	Banned	Santiago A., Luciana	Luz, Carlos	No nominations	~~Brian~~, ~~Luca~~	~~Giuliano~~, Claudio	No nominations	Juan Pablo, Katia	Sofía, Katia	No nominations	No nominations	Renato	~~Katia~~, ~~Jenifer~~	Eugenia, Marcelo	Head of Household	Eugenia, Marcelo	No nominations	~~Gabriela~~, ~~Eugenia~~	Santiago L., Gabriela	Eugenia, Katia	No nominations	Eugenia, Luz	Lourdes, Eugenia	No nominations	No nominations	No nominations	No; Nominations	María	No; Nominations	Gabriela, Juan Pablo	No; Nominations	Juan Pablo, Lucía	Eugenia, ~~Juan Pablo~~	~~**Selva**~~	Evicted (Day 183)						59
Lourdes	Ulises, Juan Pablo	~~Candela~~, Luz	Chiara, Candela	No nominations	Juan Pablo, Claudio	~~Giuliano~~	No nominations	~~Juan Pablo~~, ~~Ulises~~	Ulises, Claudio	No nominations	No nominations	Giuliano	Chiara, Ulises	Eugenia, Marcelo	No nominations	Gabriela, Marcelo	No nominations	Gabriela, Lucía	~~Gabriela~~, ~~Selva~~	Gabriela, Lucía	No nominations	Gabriela, Lucía	~~Luz~~, Sandra	No nominations	No nominations	No nominations	No; Nominations	María	No; Nominations	Juan Pablo, Lucía	No; Nominations	Lucía, Juan Pablo	Eugenia, Santiago A.	Evicted (Day 176)							53
Lucía	Not in House													Eugenia, Delfina	No nominations	Katia, Santiago A.	No nominations	Gabriela, Katia	Santiago L., Selva	Selva, Eugenia	No nominations	Selva, Catalina	Lourdes, Juan Pablo	No nominations	No nominations	No nominations	No; Nominations	Pablo	No; Nominations	Lourdes, Gabriela	No; Nominations	Juan Pablo, Selva	Evicted (Day 169)								29
Gabriela	Not in House													Delfina, Martina	No nominations	Martina, Lourdes	No nominations	Lucía, Katia	Luz, Ulises	Katia, Eugenia	Head of Household	Martina, Luz	Chiara, Selva	No nominations	No nominations	No nominations	No; Nominations	Augusto	No; Nominations	Luz, Juan Pablo	No; Nominations	Evicted (Day 161)									44
Chiara	Luz, Candela	~~Andrea~~, ~~Candela~~	Carlos, Luciana	No nominations	Andrea, Keila	Martina (4), Luciana (2)	No nominations	Jenifer, Martina	Brian, Lourdes	No nominations	No nominations	Renato	~~Sandra~~; ~~Luciana~~	Katia, Juan Pablo	No nominations	Juan Pablo (4), Katia (2)	No nominations	Juan Pablo, Katia	Santiago L., Katia	~~Lucía (3)~~, ~~Juan Pablo (2)~~	No nominations	~~Martina~~, ~~Lucía~~	Katia, Lourdes	No nominations	No nominations	No nominations	No; Nominations	Augusto	No; Nominations	Luz, Juan Pablo	Evicted (Day 155)			Sandra, Juan Pablo	Evicted (Day 155)	Juan Pablo, Katia	Evicted (Day 155)				45
Catalina	Not in House																				No nominations	Martina, Luz	~~Sandra~~, ~~Selva~~	Evicted (Day 140)																	3
Martina	Ulises, Carlos	Ulises, ~~Andrea~~	Sandra, Chiara	No nominations	Juan Pablo, Andrea	~~Chiara~~, Sofía	No nominations	Carlos, Juan Pablo	~~Ulises~~, ~~Sofía~~	No nominations	No nominations	Renato	Sandra, Katia	Marcelo, Katia	No nominations	Santiago L., Gabriela	No nominations	Eugenia, Selva	Gabriela, Katia	Katia, Selva	No nominations	Catalina, Selva	Evicted (Day 133)											Sandra, Selva	Evicted (Day 133)	Eugenia, Ulises	Evicted (Day 133)				35
Claudio	Sandra, Martina	~~Santiago A.~~, ~~Lourdes~~	Luciana, Lourdes	No nominations	Brian, Ulises	Santiago A., ~~Ulises~~	No nominations	Jenifer, Luciana	Katia, Ulises	Head of Household	No nominations	Renato	Ulises (4), Jenifer (2)	Walked (Day 70)				Eugenia, Gabriela	Santiago L., Selva	Selva, Katia	No nominations	Evicted (Day 126)																			16
Santiago L.	Not in House													Chiara, Katia	No nominations	Katia, Lourdes	No nominations	Sandra, Lucía	Luz, Lucía	Lucía, Claudio	Evicted (Day 120)													Sandra, Juan Pablo	Evicted (Day 120)						17
Juliana	Not in House																	Eugenia, Gabriela	Sandra, Luciana	No Vote	Walked (Day 115)																				2
Luciana	Carlos, Martina	Lourdes, Chiara	Chiara, Jenifer	No nominations	Luca, Claudio	Lourdes, Claudio	No nominations	Claudio, Juan Pablo	Brian, Chiara	No nominations	No nominations	Giuliano	~~Jenifer~~, Luca	Delfina, Lorenzo	No nominations	~~Lucía~~, ~~Katia~~	No nominations	Juan Pablo, Eugenia	~~Santiago L.~~, ~~Gabriela~~	Evicted (Day 113)														Selva, Ulises	Evicted (Day 113)	Ulises, Eugenia	Evicted (Day 113)				41
Lorenzo	Not in House													Delfina, Ulises	No nominations	Katia, Lourdes	No nominations	Sandra, Lourdes	Evicted (Day 105)																						2
Marcelo	Not in House													Delfina, Sandra	No nominations	Luciana, Juan Pablo	No nominations	Katia, Sandra	Evicted (Day 105)																						14
Renato	Luciana, Lourdes	~~Candela~~, ~~Santiago A.~~	Evicted (Day 14)									Secret; Room	Lourdes, Sandra	Saif, Marcelo	No nominations	Luciana, Gabriela	Re-Evicted (Day 92)																								1
Luca	Keila, Carlos	Ulises, Luciana	Jenifer, Chiara	Head of Household	Petrona, Juan Pablo	Evicted (Day 35)						Not eligible	Juan Pablo, Jenifer	Marcelo, Gabriela	No nominations	Ejected (Day 85)																									9
Delfina	Banned	Evicted (Day 8)												Eugenia, Lorenzo	No nominations	Re-Evicted (Day 84)																									20
Saif	Not in House													Ulises, Delfina	No nominations	Evicted (Day 84)																									8
Brian	Luz, Delfina	Ulises, Luz	Sandra, Jenifer	No nominations	~~Juan Pablo~~, ~~Luz~~	Giuliano; Sebastián	No nominations	Chiara, Ulises	Chiara, Ulises	No nominations	No nominations	Giuliano	Sandra, Katia	Saif, Eugenia	Evicted (Day 77)																										16
Giuliano	Carlos, Petrona	Banned	Luciana, Sandra	No nominations	Luca, Petrona	~~Petrona~~, ~~Luciana~~	No nominations	Petrona, Martina	~~Santiago A.~~, Sandra	Evicted (Day 56)		Secret; Room	Evicted (Day 56)	Re-Evicted (Day 70)																				Sandra, Selva	Re-Evicted (Day 70)	Katia, Luz	Re-Evicted (Day 70)				8
Jenifer	Banned	~~Candela~~, ~~Santiago A.~~	Luz, Sandra	Evicted (Day 21)				Chiara, Katia	Katia, Claudio	No nominations	No nominations	Giuliano	Sandra, ~~Chiara~~	Ejected (Day 67)																				Juan Pablo, Luz	Ejected (Day 67)	Juan Pablo, Luz	Ejected (Day 67)				25
Sofía	Delfina, Renato	Luciana, Giuliano	Chiara, Carlos	No nominations	Brian, Ulises	Lourdes, ~~Chiara~~	No nominations	Martina, Lourdes, Luciana	Brian, Sandra	No nominations	Evicted (Day 63)																														9
Petrona	Banned	Keila, Carlos	Luz, Sandra	No nominations	Sofía, Brian	Chiara, Giuliano	No nominations	Juan Pablo, Carlos	Ulises, Katia	No nominations	Evicted (Day 59)																							Selva, Sandra	Evicted (Day 59)						10
Carlos	Delfina, Luciana	Santiago A., Sebastián	Luz, Luciana	No nominations	Keila, Luz	~~Giuliano~~, Lourdes	No nominations	Jenifer, Katia	Evicted (Day 49)																																24
Sebastián	Luciana, Carlos	Giuliano, Luciana	Chiara, Jenifer	No nominations	Andrea, Brian	Katia, Martina	Evicted (Day 42)																																		6
Andrea	Martina, Delfina	~~Giuliano~~, ~~Chiara~~	~~Sandra~~; ~~Chiara~~	No nominations	Ulises, Juan Pablo	~~Giuliano~~, ~~Chiara~~	Walked (Day 38)																											Selva, Ulises	Walked (Day 38)						8
Keila	Carlos, Giuliano	Santiago A., Luz	Sandra, Luz	No nominations	~~Juan Pablo~~, ~~Sofía~~	Ejected (Day 32)																																			8
Ezequiel	Delfina, Lourdes	Luciana, Luz	Luciana, Luz	No nominations	Evicted (Day 28)																																				0
Candela	Chiara, Delfina	Ulises, Jenifer	Chiara, Jenifer	No nominations	Evicted (Day 28)																																				2
Temporary HouseGuests
Pablo	Not in House																							No nominations	No nominations	No nominations	No; Nominations	Augusto	No; Nominations	Katia, Lucía	Visitor Winner (Day 154)										5
María	Not in House																							No nominations	No nominations	No nominations	No; Nominations	Augusto	No; Nominations	Sandra, Lourdes	Evicted (Day 151)										3
Alberto	Not in House																							Head of Household		No; Nominations	Giovanni to evict	Pablo	No; Nominations	Evicted (Day 150)											1
Augusto	Not in House																							No nominations	No nominations	No nominations	No; Nominations	Pablo	Evicted (Day 149)												7
Giovanni	Not in House																							No nominations	No nominations	No nominations	No; Nominations	Evicted (Day 148)													N/A
Ariel	Not in House																							No nominations	No nominations	No nominations	Evicted (Day 147)														N/A
Cecilia V.	Not in House																							No nominations	No nominations	No nominations	Evicted (Day 147)														N/A
Lucas	Not in House																							No nominations	No nominations	No nominations	Evicted (Day 147)														N/A
Gisela	Not in House																							No nominations	No nominations	No nominations	Walked (Day 146)														N/A
Guillermo	Not in House																							No nominations	No nominations	Evicted (Day 144)															N/A
Cecilia B.	Not in House																							No nominations	Evicted (Day 143)																N/A
Melina	Not in House																							No nominations	Evicted (Day 143)																N/A
Notes	1	2, 3, 4	5, 6, 7	8, 9, 10	11, 12, 13, 14, 15	8, 16, 17, 18, 19, 20	21	8, 22, 23, 24	25, 26, 27, 28, 29, 30	8, 25, 31, 32	33	34	32, 35, 36, 37, 38, 39, 40, 41, 42, 43	32, 44, 45, 46, 47, 48	8, 49, 50, 51, 52	53, 54, 55, 56, 57, 58, 59	60	8, 57, 61, 62, 63, 64, 65	66, 67, 68, 69	70, 71, 72, 73, 74, 75	8, 76	77, 78, 79, 80, 81	82, 83, 84, 85, 86, 87, 88	8, 89		8, 90, 91	92	93	94	46, 95, 96, 97	8, 98	99, 100, 101	8, 102, 103, 104	104, 105, 106, 107	111, 112	107, 108, 109, 110, 112, 113	none	114			
Ejected	none				**Keila**	none							**Jenifer**	none		**Luca**	none																								
Walked	none					**Andrea**	none						**Claudio**	none						**Juliana**	none																				
Nominated	Carlos, Delfina, Luciana, Ulises	Luciana, Luz, Martina, Renato, Santiago A., Ulises	Andrea, Brian, Chiara, Jenifer, Luciana, Luz, Sandra, Santiago	none	Andrea, Brian; Juan Pablo, Luca, Lourdes, Sandra	Brian, Chiara, Giuliano, Lourdes, Luciana, Martina, Sandra, Sebastián, Sofía	none	Brian, Carlos, Chiara, Jenifer, Juan Pablo, Lourdes, Martina, Santiago A.	Brian, Claudio, Giuliano, Jenifer, Juan Pablo, Katia, Luciana, Luz, Ulises	none		Giuliano, Renato	Brian, Juan Pablo, Giuliano; Katia, Sandra, Santiago A., Ulises	Brian, Delfina, Eugenia, Luca, Luz, Marcelo, Renato, Saif, Selva	none			Chiara, Eugenia, Gabriela, Katia, Lorenzo, Lucía, Luciana, Marcelo, Santiago A., Santiago L., Ulises	Chiara, Claudio, Eugenia, Gabriela, Luz, Luciana, Santiago L., Selva	Chiara, Eugenia, ~~Juliana~~, Katia, Lourdes, Lucía, Luz, Sandra, Santiago A., Santiago L., Selva	none	Catalina, Eugenia, Gabriela, Luz, Martina, Selva, Ulises	none				~~Alberto~~, Augusto, Giovanni, María, Pablo	Alberto, Augusto, María, Pablo	Augusto, María, Pablo	María, Pablo	none										
Nominated	Carlos, Delfina, Luciana, Ulises	Luciana, Luz, Martina, Renato, Santiago A., Ulises	Andrea, Brian, Chiara, Jenifer, Luciana, Luz, Sandra, Santiago	none	Andrea, Brian; Juan Pablo, Luca, Lourdes, Sandra	Brian, Chiara, Giuliano, Lourdes, Luciana, Martina, Sandra, Sebastián, Sofía	none	Brian, Carlos, Chiara, Jenifer, Juan Pablo, Lourdes, Martina, Santiago A.	Brian, Claudio, Giuliano, Jenifer, Juan Pablo, Katia, Luciana, Luz, Ulises	none		Giuliano, Renato	Brian, Juan Pablo, Giuliano; Katia, Sandra, Santiago A., Ulises	Brian, Delfina, Eugenia, Luca, Luz, Marcelo, Renato, Saif, Selva	none			Chiara, Eugenia, Gabriela, Katia, Lorenzo, Lucía, Luciana, Marcelo, Santiago A., Santiago L., Ulises	Chiara, Claudio, Eugenia, Gabriela, Luz, Luciana, Santiago L., Selva	Chiara, Eugenia, ~~Juliana~~, Katia, Lourdes, Lucía, Luz, Sandra, Santiago A., Santiago L., Selva	none	Catalina, Eugenia, Gabriela, Luz, Martina, Selva, Ulises	none				~~Alberto~~, Augusto, Giovanni, María, Pablo	Alberto, Augusto, María, Pablo	Augusto, María, Pablo	Chiara, Gabriela, Juan Pablo, Lourdes, Luz	none										
Saved (by HoH)	Luciana	Luz	~~Sandra~~	none	Juan Pablo	~~Sofía~~	none	~~Jenifer~~	Katia	none			~~Juan Pablo~~	Saif	none			Lucía	Santiago L.	~~Santiago A.~~	none	Luz	none							Juan Pablo	none										
Nominated (by HoH)	Claudio	Keila	~~Martina~~	none	Petrona	~~Santiago A.~~	none	~~Katia~~	Chiara	none			~~Lourdes~~	Ulises	none			Selva	Santiago A.	~~Gabriela~~	none	~~Catalina~~; Chiara	none							Sandra	none										
Against public vote	Carlos, Claudio, Delfina, Ulises	Keila, Luciana, Martina, Renato, Santiago A., Ulises	Andrea, Brian, Chiara, Jenifer, Luciana, Luz, Sandra, Santiago A.	All; HouseGuests except of Luca	Andrea, ~~Brian~~, Luca, Lourdes, Petrona, Sandra	Brian, Chiara, Giuliano, Lourdes, Luciana, Martina, Sandra, Sebastián, Sofía	Candela, Delfina, Ezequiel, Jenifer, Luca, Renato, Sebastián	Brian, Carlos, Chiara, Jenifer, Juan Pablo, Lourdes, Martina, Santiago A.	Brian, Chiara, Claudio, Giuliano, Jenifer, Juan Pablo, Luciana, Luz, Ulises	All; HouseGuests except of Claudio	Candela, Carlos, Delfina, Ezequiel, Giuliano, Luca, Renato, Sebastián, Sofía	none	Brian, Juan Pablo, Giuliano; Katia, Sandra, Santiago A., Ulises	Brian, Delfina, Eugenia, Luca, Luz, Marcelo, Renato, Selva, Ulises	All; HouseGuests except of Sandra	Eugenia, Gabriela, Juan Pablo, Katia, Renato, Sandra	none	Chiara, Eugenia, Gabriela, Katia, Lorenzo, Luciana, Marcelo, Santiago A., Santiago L., Selva, Ulises	Chiara, Claudio, Eugenia, Gabriela, Luz, Luciana, Santiago A., Selva	Chiara, Eugenia, Katia, Lourdes, Lucía, Luz, Sandra, Santiago A., Santiago L., Selva	All; HouseGuests except of Gabriela	Catalina, Chiara, Eugenia, Gabriela, Martina, Selva, Ulises	Catalina, Chiara, Eugenia, Gabriela, Katia, Lourdes, Luz, Sandra, Ulises	All; Visitors except of Alberto		All; Visitors	none			Chiara, Gabriela, Lourdes, Luz, Sandra	All; HouseGuests except of Juan Pablo	Juan Pablo, Katia, Lucía, Luz, Selva, Ulises	Eugenia, Juan Pablo, Katia, Lourdes, Luz, Santiago A., Selva	Eugenia, Juan Pablo, Katia, Sandra, Selva, Ulises	Chiara, Giuliano, Jenifer, Luciana, Martina, ~~Petrona~~	Eugenia, Juan Pablo, Katia, Ulises	Juan Pablo, Luz, Selva, Santiago A., Ulises	Eugenia, Luz, Santiago A., Selva, Ulises	Eugenia, Luz, Santiago A., Ulises	Luz, Santiago A., Ulises	
Evicted	**Delfina**; 58.90% to evict (out of 2)	**Renato**; 92.30% to evict (out of 2)	**Jenifer**; 65.70% to evict (out of 2)	**Candela**; 12.80% to save (out of 3)	**Brian**; Giuliano's choice to evict (out of 16)	**Sebastián**; 40.60% to save (out of 2)	**Jenifer**; 57.40% to re-enter	**Carlos**; 31.40% to save (out of 2)	**Giuliano**; 68.60% to evict (out of 2)	**Petrona**; 0.26% to save (out of 14)	**Luca**; 63.10% to re-enter	**Renato**; 7 of 13 votes to return	**Giuliano**; 60.40% to evict (out of 2)	**Brian**; 52.40% to evict (out of 2)	**Saif**; 25.90% to save (out of 3)	**Renato**; 57.50% to evict (out of 2)	**Juliana**; 59.80% to enter (out of 3)	**Marcelo**; 22.20% to save (out of 3)	**Luciana**; 51.20% to evict (out of 2)	**Santiago L.** 50.40% to evict (out of 2)	**Claudio**; 4.20% to save (out of 7)	**Martina**; 52.70% to evict (out of 2)	**Catalina**; 51.80% to evict (out of 2)	**Melina**; Fewest votes to save	**Guillermo**; Fewest votes to save	**Lucas**; Fewest votes to save	**Giovanni**; Alberto's choice to evict	**Augusto**; 7 of 16 votes to evict	**Alberto**; HouseGuests' choice to evict	**Pablo**; Won; Competition	**Gabriela**; 2.30% to save	**Lucía**; 53.40% to evict (out of 2)	**Lourdes**; 9.20% to save (out of 5)	**Sandra**; 52.40% to evict (out of 2)	**Chiara**; 33.80% to win	**Katia**; 52.40% to evict (out of 2)	**Juan Pablo**; 61.30% to evict (out of 2)	**Selva**; 2.90% to win	**Eugenia**; 15.70% to win	**Luz**; 25.50% to win (out of 3)	
Evicted	**Delfina**; 58.90% to evict (out of 2)	**Renato**; 92.30% to evict (out of 2)	**Jenifer**; 65.70% to evict (out of 2)	**Candela**; 12.80% to save (out of 3)	**Brian**; Giuliano's choice to evict (out of 16)	**Sebastián**; 40.60% to save (out of 2)	**Jenifer**; 57.40% to re-enter	**Carlos**; 31.40% to save (out of 2)	**Giuliano**; 68.60% to evict (out of 2)	**Petrona**; 0.26% to save (out of 14)	**Luca**; 63.10% to re-enter	**Renato**; 7 of 13 votes to return	**Giuliano**; 60.40% to evict (out of 2)	**Brian**; 52.40% to evict (out of 2)	**Saif**; 25.90% to save (out of 3)	**Renato**; 57.50% to evict (out of 2)	**Juliana**; 59.80% to enter (out of 3)	**Marcelo**; 22.20% to save (out of 3)	**Luciana**; 51.20% to evict (out of 2)	**Santiago L.** 50.40% to evict (out of 2)	**Claudio**; 4.20% to save (out of 7)	**Martina**; 52.70% to evict (out of 2)	**Catalina**; 51.80% to evict (out of 2)	**Melina**; Fewest votes to save	**Guillermo**; Fewest votes to save	**Cecilia V.** Fewest votes to save	**Giovanni**; Alberto's choice to evict	**Augusto**; 7 of 16 votes to evict	**Alberto**; HouseGuests' choice to evict	**Chiara**; 57.30% to evict (out of 2)	**Gabriela**; 2.30% to save	**Lucía**; 53.40% to evict (out of 2)	**Lourdes**; 9.20% to save (out of 5)	**Sandra**; 52.40% to evict (out of 2)	**Chiara**; 33.80% to win	**Katia**; 52.40% to evict (out of 2)	**Juan Pablo**; 61.30% to evict (out of 2)	**Selva**; 2.90% to win	**Eugenia**; 15.70% to win	**Ulises**; 37.20% to win (out of 2)	
Evicted	**Delfina**; 58.90% to evict (out of 2)	**Renato**; 92.30% to evict (out of 2)	**Jenifer**; 65.70% to evict (out of 2)	**Ezequiel**; 23.40% to save (out of 3)	**Luca**; 53.80% to evict (out of 2)	**Sebastián**; 40.60% to save (out of 2)	**Jenifer**; 57.40% to re-enter	**Carlos**; 31.40% to save (out of 2)	**Giuliano**; 68.60% to evict (out of 2)	**Sofía**; 0.30% to save (out of 13)	**Luca**; 63.10% to re-enter	**Renato**; 7 of 13 votes to return	**Giuliano**; 60.40% to evict (out of 2)	**Brian**; 52.40% to evict (out of 2)	**Delfina**; 28.30% to save (out of 3)	**Renato**; 57.50% to evict (out of 2)	**Claudio**; 23.70% to enter (out of 3)	**Lorenzo**; 31.30% to save (out of 3)	**Luciana**; 51.20% to evict (out of 2)	**Santiago L.** 50.40% to evict (out of 2)	**Claudio**; 4.20% to save (out of 7)	**Martina**; 52.70% to evict (out of 2)	**Catalina**; 51.80% to evict (out of 2)	**Cecilia B.** Fewest votes to save	**Guillermo**; Fewest votes to save	**Ariel**; Fewest votes to save	**Giovanni**; Alberto's choice to evict	**Augusto**; 7 of 16 votes to evict	**Alberto**; HouseGuests' choice to evict	**Chiara**; 57.30% to evict (out of 2)	**Gabriela**; 2.30% to save	**Lucía**; 53.40% to evict (out of 2)	**Lourdes**; 9.20% to save (out of 5)	**Sandra**; 52.40% to evict (out of 2)	**Chiara**; 33.80% to win	**Katia**; 52.40% to evict (out of 2)	**Juan Pablo**; 61.30% to evict (out of 2)	**Selva**; 2.90% to win	**Eugenia**; 15.70% to win	**Ulises**; 37.20% to win (out of 2)	
Saved	**Ulises**; 41.10% (out of 2); **Claudio**; 21.90% (out of 3); **Carlos**; 11.70% (out of 4)	**Santiago A.** 7.70% (out of 2); **Ulises**; 8.30% (out of 3); **Martina**; 3.60% (out of 4); **Luciana**; 3.48% (out of 5); **Keila**; 2.20% (out of 6)	**Luz**; 34.30% (out of 2); **Chiara**; 17.90% (out of 3); **Santiago A.** 12.20% (out of 4); **Sandra**; 9.78% (out of 5); **Luciana**; 7.92% (out of 6); **Brian**; 6.40% (out of 7); **Andrea**; 1.26% (out of 8)	**Sebastián**; 63.80% (out of 3); **Juan Pablo**; 38.10% (out of 4); **Sofía**; 33.70% (out of 5); **Giuliano**; 30.20% (out of 6); **Keila**; 31.10% (out of 7); **Carlos**; 20% (out of 8); **Claudio**; 17.60% (out of 9); **Martina**; 22.30% (out of 10); **Andrea**; **Brian**; **Chiara**; **Lourdes**; **Luciana**; **Luz**; **Petrona**; **Sandra**; **Santiago A.** **Ulises**; Most votes (out of 20)	**Sandra**; 46.20% (out of 2); **Andrea**; 19.60% (out of 3); **Lourdes**; 12.20% (out of 4); **Petrona**; 5.30% (out of 5)	**Sofía**; 59.40% (out of 2); **Martina**; 47.30% (out of 3); **Brian**; 33.80% (out of 4); **Giuliano**; 29.50% (out of 5); **Chiara**; 28.40% (out of 6); **Luciana**; 25% (out of 7); **Sandra**; 20.10% (out of 8); **Lourdes**; 18.50% (out of 9)	**Candela**; **Delfina**; **Ezequiel**; **Luca**; **Renato**; **Sebastián**; Fewest votes	**Juan Pablo**; 68.60% (out of 2); **Jenifer**; 47.50% (out of 3); **Martina**; 33.10% (out of 4); **Brian**; 35.50% (out of 5); **Chiara**; 34.20% (out of 6); **Lourdes**; 27.10% (out of 7); **Santiago A.** 32.40% (out of 8)	**Luz**; 31.40% (out of 2); **Juan Pablo**; 15.90% (out of 3); **Claudio**; 10.60% (out of 4); **Jenifer**; 6.70% (out of 5); **Chiara**; 2.90% (out of 6); **Luciana**; 2.55% (out of 7); **Ulises**; 2.10% (out of 8); **Brian**; 0.60% (out of 9)	??? 0.90% ??? 2% ??? 2.20% ??? 3.60% ??? 4% ??? 4.10% ??? 4.40% ??? 4.80% ??? 17.60% ??? 17.80% ??? 17.90% ??? 20.40%	**Giuliano**; 13.30% **Renato**; 11.10% **Delfina**; 3.70% **Sebastián**; 3% **Ezequiel**; 1.60% **Carlos**; 1.50% **Candela**; 1.40% **Sofía**; 1.30%	**Giuliano**; 6 of 13 votes to return	**Brian**; 39.60% (out of 2); **Juan Pablo**; 24.80% (out of 3); **Ulises**; 17.20% (out of 4); **Sandra**; 9.30% (out of 5); **Katia**; 6.90% (out of 6); **Santiago A.** 2.60% (out of 7)	**Luz**; 47.60% (out of 2); **Luca**; 2.93% (out of 3); **Delfina**; 2.24% (out of 4); **Renato**; 1.75% (out of 5); **Ulises**; 1.68% (out of 6); **Selva**; 1.46% (out of 7); **Eugenia**; 1.30% (out of 8); **Marcelo**; 0.80% (out of 9)	**Marcelo**; 45.80% (out of 3); **Lucía**; 32.10% (out of 4); **Gabriela**; 35.70% (out of 5); **Lorenzo**; 35.70% (out of 6); **Santiago L.** 38.60% (out of 7); **Juan Pablo**; 38.10% (out of 8); **Luciana**; 33.80% (out of 9); **Katia**; Won; Competition (out of 3); **Chiara**; **Eugenia**; **Lourdes**; **Luca**; **Luz**; **Martina**; **Renato**; **Santiago A.** **Selva**; **Ulises**; Most votes (out of 20)	**Katia**; 42.50% (out of 2); **Gabriela**; 31.70% (out of 3); **Juan Pablo**; 12.20% (out of 4); **Eugenia**; 8.50% (out of 5); **Sandra**; 6.03% (out of 6)		**Gabriela**; 46.50% (out of 3); **Katia**; 38.70% (out of 4); **Santiago L.** 37.70% (out of 5); **Luciana**; 29.90% (out of 6); **Eugenia**; 28.60% (out of 7); **Selva**; 32% (out of 8); **Chiara**; 36.70% (out of 9); **Ulises**; 35.20% (out of 10); **Santiago A.** 29.80% (out of 11)	**Chiara**; 48.80% (out of 2); **Gabriela**; 11.20% (out of 3); **Luz**; 3.60% (out of 4); **Eugenia**; 2.30% (out of 5); **Claudio**; 1.95% (out of 6); **Santiago A.** 1.10% (out of 7); **Selva**; 0.30% (out of 8)	**Luz**; 49.60% (out of 2); **Chiara**; 19.50% (out of 3); **Katia**; 6.50% (out of 4); **Sandra**; 4.80% (out of 5); **Lourdes**; 2.40% (out of 6); **Eugenia**; 1.70% (out of 7); **Selva**; 1.54% (out of 8); **Santiago A.** 1.43% (out of 9); **Lucía**; 1.10% (out of 10)	**Sandra**; 7.10% (out of 7); **Katia**; 14.60% (out of 7); **Lourdes**; 16.60% (out of 7); **Lucía**; 17.10% (out of 7); **Martina**; 18.70% (out of 7); **Juan Pablo**; 21.70% (out of 7); **Catalina**; **Chiara**; **Eugenia**; **Luz**; **Santiago A.** **Selva**; **Ulises**; Most votes (out of 14)	**Catalina**; 47.30% (out of 2); **Chiara**; 28.90% (out of 3); **Ulises**; 12.70% (out of 4); **Gabriela**; 6.20% (out of 5); **Selva**; 1.10% (out of 6); **Eugenia**; 0.50% (out of 7)	**Luz**; 48.20% (out of 2); **Gabriela**; 13.80% (out of 3); **Ulises**; 6.90% (out of 4); **Lourdes**; 5.30% (out of 5); **Chiara**; 2.90% (out of 6); **Sandra**; 1.40% (out of 7); **Katia**; 0.80% (out of 8); **Eugenia**; 0.40% (out of 9)	**Ariel**; **Augusto**; **Gisela**; **Cecilia V.** **Giovanni**; **Guillermo**; **Lucas**; **María**; **Pablo**; Most votes	**Ariel**; **Augusto**; **Gisela**; **Cecilia V.** **Giovanni**; **Lucas**; **María**; **Pablo**; Most votes	**Alberto**; **Augusto**; **Giovanni**; **María**; **Pablo**; Most votes	**Augusto**; **María**; **Pablo**; Alberto's choice to save	**Pablo**; 5 of 16 votes to evict **María**; 3 of 16 votes to evict **Alberto**; 1 of 16 vote to evict	**María**; **Pablo**; HouseGuests' choice to save	**María**; Loss; Competition	**Lucía**; 3.50% **Eugenia**; **Katia**; **Lourdes**; **Luz**; **Sandra**; **Santiago A.** **Selva**; **Ulisses**; Most votes	**Juan Pablo**; 46.60% (out of 2); **Ulises**; 21.80% (out of 3); **Luz**; 16.60% (out of 4); **Selva**; 8.90% (out of 5); **Katia**; 7.30% (out of 6)	**Katia**; 11.50% (out of 5); **Eugenia**; **Luz**; **Selva**; Most votes (out of 5); **Juan Pablo**; **Santiago A.** Most votes (out of 7)	**Selva**; 47.60% (out of 2); **Katia**; 25.80% (out of 3); **Eugenia**; 16.30% (out of 4); **Ulises**; 12.30% (out of 5); **Juan Pablo**; 5.50% (out of 6)	**Martina**; 25.30% **Luciana**; 16.60% **Jenifer**; 12.90% **Giuliano**; 11.40%	**Eugenia**; 47.60% (out of 2); **Ulises**; 18.80% (out of 3); **Juan Pablo**; 13.50% (out of 4)	**Selva**; 38.70% (out of 2); **Santiago A.** 5.80% (out of 3); **Luz**; 4.10% (out of 4); **Ulises**; 1.20% (out of 5)	**Eugenia**; **Luz**; **Santiago A.** **Ulises**; Most votes	**Luz**; **Santiago A.** **Ulises**; Most votes	**Santiago A.** 62.80% to win	
Saved	**Ulises**; 41.10% (out of 2); **Claudio**; 21.90% (out of 3); **Carlos**; 11.70% (out of 4)	**Santiago A.** 7.70% (out of 2); **Ulises**; 8.30% (out of 3); **Martina**; 3.60% (out of 4); **Luciana**; 3.48% (out of 5); **Keila**; 2.20% (out of 6)	**Luz**; 34.30% (out of 2); **Chiara**; 17.90% (out of 3); **Santiago A.** 12.20% (out of 4); **Sandra**; 9.78% (out of 5); **Luciana**; 7.92% (out of 6); **Brian**; 6.40% (out of 7); **Andrea**; 1.26% (out of 8)	**Sebastián**; 63.80% (out of 3); **Juan Pablo**; 38.10% (out of 4); **Sofía**; 33.70% (out of 5); **Giuliano**; 30.20% (out of 6); **Keila**; 31.10% (out of 7); **Carlos**; 20% (out of 8); **Claudio**; 17.60% (out of 9); **Martina**; 22.30% (out of 10); **Andrea**; **Brian**; **Chiara**; **Lourdes**; **Luciana**; **Luz**; **Petrona**; **Sandra**; **Santiago A.** **Ulises**; Most votes (out of 20)	**Sandra**; 46.20% (out of 2); **Andrea**; 19.60% (out of 3); **Lourdes**; 12.20% (out of 4); **Petrona**; 5.30% (out of 5)	**Sofía**; 59.40% (out of 2); **Martina**; 47.30% (out of 3); **Brian**; 33.80% (out of 4); **Giuliano**; 29.50% (out of 5); **Chiara**; 28.40% (out of 6); **Luciana**; 25% (out of 7); **Sandra**; 20.10% (out of 8); **Lourdes**; 18.50% (out of 9)	**Candela**; **Delfina**; **Ezequiel**; **Luca**; **Renato**; **Sebastián**; Fewest votes	**Juan Pablo**; 68.60% (out of 2); **Jenifer**; 47.50% (out of 3); **Martina**; 33.10% (out of 4); **Brian**; 35.50% (out of 5); **Chiara**; 34.20% (out of 6); **Lourdes**; 27.10% (out of 7); **Santiago A.** 32.40% (out of 8)	**Luz**; 31.40% (out of 2); **Juan Pablo**; 15.90% (out of 3); **Claudio**; 10.60% (out of 4); **Jenifer**; 6.70% (out of 5); **Chiara**; 2.90% (out of 6); **Luciana**; 2.55% (out of 7); **Ulises**; 2.10% (out of 8); **Brian**; 0.60% (out of 9)	??? 0.90% ??? 2% ??? 2.20% ??? 3.60% ??? 4% ??? 4.10% ??? 4.40% ??? 4.80% ??? 17.60% ??? 17.80% ??? 17.90% ??? 20.40%	**Giuliano**; 13.30% **Renato**; 11.10% **Delfina**; 3.70% **Sebastián**; 3% **Ezequiel**; 1.60% **Carlos**; 1.50% **Candela**; 1.40% **Sofía**; 1.30%	**Giuliano**; 6 of 13 votes to return	**Brian**; 39.60% (out of 2); **Juan Pablo**; 24.80% (out of 3); **Ulises**; 17.20% (out of 4); **Sandra**; 9.30% (out of 5); **Katia**; 6.90% (out of 6); **Santiago A.** 2.60% (out of 7)	**Luz**; 47.60% (out of 2); **Luca**; 2.93% (out of 3); **Delfina**; 2.24% (out of 4); **Renato**; 1.75% (out of 5); **Ulises**; 1.68% (out of 6); **Selva**; 1.46% (out of 7); **Eugenia**; 1.30% (out of 8); **Marcelo**; 0.80% (out of 9)	**Marcelo**; 45.80% (out of 3); **Lucía**; 32.10% (out of 4); **Gabriela**; 35.70% (out of 5); **Lorenzo**; 35.70% (out of 6); **Santiago L.** 38.60% (out of 7); **Juan Pablo**; 38.10% (out of 8); **Luciana**; 33.80% (out of 9); **Katia**; Won; Competition (out of 3); **Chiara**; **Eugenia**; **Lourdes**; **Luca**; **Luz**; **Martina**; **Renato**; **Santiago A.** **Selva**; **Ulises**; Most votes (out of 20)	**Katia**; 42.50% (out of 2); **Gabriela**; 31.70% (out of 3); **Juan Pablo**; 12.20% (out of 4); **Eugenia**; 8.50% (out of 5); **Sandra**; 6.03% (out of 6)		**Gabriela**; 46.50% (out of 3); **Katia**; 38.70% (out of 4); **Santiago L.** 37.70% (out of 5); **Luciana**; 29.90% (out of 6); **Eugenia**; 28.60% (out of 7); **Selva**; 32% (out of 8); **Chiara**; 36.70% (out of 9); **Ulises**; 35.20% (out of 10); **Santiago A.** 29.80% (out of 11)	**Chiara**; 48.80% (out of 2); **Gabriela**; 11.20% (out of 3); **Luz**; 3.60% (out of 4); **Eugenia**; 2.30% (out of 5); **Claudio**; 1.95% (out of 6); **Santiago A.** 1.10% (out of 7); **Selva**; 0.30% (out of 8)	**Luz**; 49.60% (out of 2); **Chiara**; 19.50% (out of 3); **Katia**; 6.50% (out of 4); **Sandra**; 4.80% (out of 5); **Lourdes**; 2.40% (out of 6); **Eugenia**; 1.70% (out of 7); **Selva**; 1.54% (out of 8); **Santiago A.** 1.43% (out of 9); **Lucía**; 1.10% (out of 10)	**Sandra**; 7.10% (out of 7); **Katia**; 14.60% (out of 7); **Lourdes**; 16.60% (out of 7); **Lucía**; 17.10% (out of 7); **Martina**; 18.70% (out of 7); **Juan Pablo**; 21.70% (out of 7); **Catalina**; **Chiara**; **Eugenia**; **Luz**; **Santiago A.** **Selva**; **Ulises**; Most votes (out of 14)	**Catalina**; 47.30% (out of 2); **Chiara**; 28.90% (out of 3); **Ulises**; 12.70% (out of 4); **Gabriela**; 6.20% (out of 5); **Selva**; 1.10% (out of 6); **Eugenia**; 0.50% (out of 7)	**Luz**; 48.20% (out of 2); **Gabriela**; 13.80% (out of 3); **Ulises**; 6.90% (out of 4); **Lourdes**; 5.30% (out of 5); **Chiara**; 2.90% (out of 6); **Sandra**; 1.40% (out of 7); **Katia**; 0.80% (out of 8); **Eugenia**; 0.40% (out of 9)	**Ariel**; **Augusto**; **Gisela**; **Cecilia V.** **Giovanni**; **Guillermo**; **Lucas**; **María**; **Pablo**; Most votes	**Ariel**; **Augusto**; **Gisela**; **Cecilia V.** **Giovanni**; **Lucas**; **María**; **Pablo**; Most votes	**Alberto**; **Augusto**; **Giovanni**; **María**; **Pablo**; Most votes	**Augusto**; **María**; **Pablo**; Alberto's choice to save	**Pablo**; 5 of 16 votes to evict **María**; 3 of 16 votes to evict **Alberto**; 1 of 16 vote to evict	**María**; **Pablo**; HouseGuests' choice to save	**Luz**; 42.70% (out of 2); **Gabriela**; 10.80% (out of 3); **Lourdes**; 8.90% (out of 4); **Sandra**; 8.10% (out of 5)	**Lucía**; 3.50% **Eugenia**; **Katia**; **Lourdes**; **Luz**; **Sandra**; **Santiago A.** **Selva**; **Ulisses**; Most votes	**Juan Pablo**; 46.60% (out of 2); **Ulises**; 21.80% (out of 3); **Luz**; 16.60% (out of 4); **Selva**; 8.90% (out of 5); **Katia**; 7.30% (out of 6)	**Katia**; 11.50% (out of 5); **Eugenia**; **Luz**; **Selva**; Most votes (out of 5); **Juan Pablo**; **Santiago A.** Most votes (out of 7)	**Selva**; 47.60% (out of 2); **Katia**; 25.80% (out of 3); **Eugenia**; 16.30% (out of 4); **Ulises**; 12.30% (out of 5); **Juan Pablo**; 5.50% (out of 6)	**Martina**; 25.30% **Luciana**; 16.60% **Jenifer**; 12.90% **Giuliano**; 11.40%	**Eugenia**; 47.60% (out of 2); **Ulises**; 18.80% (out of 3); **Juan Pablo**; 13.50% (out of 4)	**Selva**; 38.70% (out of 2); **Santiago A.** 5.80% (out of 3); **Luz**; 4.10% (out of 4); **Ulises**; 1.20% (out of 5)	**Eugenia**; **Luz**; **Santiago A.** **Ulises**; Most votes	**Luz**; **Santiago A.** **Ulises**; Most votes	**Santiago A.** 62.80% to win	

=== Notes ===
- **^1**: After becoming the Head of Household, Santiago A. was able to ban four HouseGuests' ability to nominate, making Delfina, Jenifer, Petrona and Sandra not able to nominate this week.
- **^2**: After becoming the Head of Household, Sofía was able to ban two HouseGuests' ability to nominate and nominate two HouseGuests' for eviction without the possibility of being saved. She chose to ban Giuliano and Ulises from nominating this week and nominated Martina and Renato for eviction.
- **^3**: As punishment for announcing his intention to use the Special Nomination Power, Claudio's votes were voided.
- **^4**: As punishment for discussing nominations, the votes of Chiara, Jenifer, Lourdes, Martina and Renato towards Andrea, Candela and Santiago A. were voided.
- **^5**: As punishment for opening a kiosk box without permission, Brian was automatically nominated without the possibility of being saved by the Head of Household.
- **^6**: After becoming the Head of Household, Ulises votes counted as doubled. He also won the right to give one HouseGuest immunity from the next eviction. He chose Giuliano. And finally he won the right to nominate two HouseGuests' without the possibility of being saved. He chose Andrea and Santiago A..
- **^7**: As punishment for discussing salvation and discussing who he would pick as the replacement nominee, Ulises's choice of saving Sandra was nulled. In addition, his choice of nominating Martina for eviction was also nulled.
- **^8**: This week, the public were voting to save rather than evict.
- **^9**: This week there was no nominations. Instead all HouseGuest except Luca (who won the HoH competition) face the public vote. The HouseGuest with the fewest votes to save would be evicted.
- **^10**: As punishment for abandoning the weekly shopping task as a group, this week's eviction is now changed to a double eviction.
- **^11**: After becoming the Head of Household, Giuliano won the right give one HouseGuest immunity from the next eviction. He chose Chiara. He also won the right to nominate two HouseGuests' without the possibility of being saved. He chose Lourdes and Sandra.
- **^12**: As there was no nominations in Week 4, Jenifer voided Sandra's votes for Week 5.
- **^13**: This week, Head of Household Giuliano had to evict one HouseGuest. This HouseGuest could already be nominated or not nominated. Unbeknownst to him and the other HouseGuests, the evictee had to choose to either remain evicted or head into hiding and return to the House at the next eviction gala. He chose Brian.
- **^14**: After complaining about the production, the house and the format on multiple occasions, Keila was ejected by Gran Hermano.
- **^15**: Brian had to choose to remain evicted or head into hiding and return at the eviction gala. Brian chose to enter hiding and return at the eviction gala.
- **^16**: This week, Head of Household Juan Pablo won the right to nominate two HouseGuests without the possibility of being saved. He chose Sandra and Brian. He also chose Chiara to have their votes double during nominations. Finally, he chose Lourdes to only cast one vote during the nominations.
- **^17**: During Nominations, Andrea decided walk from the game due to health reasons. Before she left, she was eligible to vote before her exit from the house.
- **^18**: As punishment for discussing nominations, Andrea, Carlos, Claudio, Lourdes, Martina, Sandra, Santiago A. and Sofía's votes towards Chiara, Giuliano, Luciana, Petrona and Ulises were voided.
- **^19**: Santiago A. answered the red phone, and had to choose to have a banquet for eight or nominate two HouseGuests. Santiago A. chose to nominate two HouseGuests and chose Sofía and Chiara to face eviction.
- **^20**: As punishment for discussing salvation and discussing who he would pick as the replacement nominee, Juan Pablo's choice of saving Sofía was nulled. In addition, his choice of nominating Santiago A. for eviction was also nulled.
- **^21**: Due to Andrea's medical withdraw, a repechage took place among the previous evictees. As Keila was ejected from the game, she was ineligible to take part in the repechage. Jenifer received the most votes and therefore returned to the house.
- **^22**: This week, Head of Household Giuliano won the right to nominate two HouseGuests without the possibility of being saved. He chose Santiago and Brian. He also chose three HouseGuests to have the power to nominate three HouseGuests instead of two. He chose Juan Pablo, Sofía, and Ulises.
- **^23**: Chiara answered the Red Phone, and had to choose seven HouseGuests. Unaware, that the seven HouseGuests and herself will nominate face to face this week. She chose Sandra, Luz, Petrona, Claudio, Santiago A., Carlos, and Luciana.
- **^24**: As punishment for discussing salvation and discussing who he would pick as the replacement nominee, Giuliano's choice of saving Jenifer was nulled. In addition, his choice of nominating Katia for eviction was also nulled.
- **^25**: This week, Head of Household Santiago A. won the right ban one HouseGuest from competing in next weeks HoH competition. He chose Juan Pablo. He also won the right to nominate two HouseGuests without the possibility of being saved. He chose Giuliano and Juan Pablo.
- **^26**: As punishment for moving during The Freeze, Luciana was automatically nominated for eviction without the possibility of being saved by the Head of Household.
- **^27**: This week HouseGuests that nominated in the diary room last week, were required to nominate face to face this week. Those HouseGuests are Brian, Giuliano, Jenifer, Juan Pablo, Katia, Lourdes, Martina, Sofía and Ulises.
- **^28**: As punishment for sharing information from the outside world, Jenifer was automatically nominated for eviction without the possibility of being saved by the Head of Household.
- **^29**: As Santiago A. was Head of Household, Giuliano special nomination vote towards him was nulled.
- **^30**: As punishment for moving during The Freeze, Luz was automatically nominated for eviction.
- **^31**: Following Giuliano's eviction, it was announced there will be no nominations. Instead all HouseGuest except Claudio (who won the HoH competition) face the public vote. The HouseGuest with the fewest votes to save would be evicted on Wednesday, while the HouseGuest with the second fewest votes to save will be evicted on Sunday.
- **^32**: As punishment for speaking and moving during The Freeze, Brian was permanently nominated until the end of his stay in the house, furthermore he was banned from competing in the HoH competition during Week 9.
- **^33**: Following Sofía's eviction, the public had to vote for three ex-HouseGuests to be eligible for re-entry into the house. As Keila was ejected and Andrea walked due to medical reasons, both of them were not included in the vote. Petrona who was evicted in Week 9, declined to take part in the vote as well. Luca received the most votes from the public and therefore re-enter the house. Giuliano and Renato received the second and third most votes from the public and therefore would face a house vote.
- **^34**: The HouseGuests voted for the evictee that they wanted re-enter the house. As Luca re-entered the house, he was ineligible to vote.
- **^35**: This week, Head of Household Claudio had votes count as doubled. He also won the right to nominate one HouseGuest without the possibility of being saved. He chose Santiago A..
- **^36**: As there was no nominations in Week 9, Giuliano voided Chiara's votes for Week 10.
- **^37**: As there was no nominations in Week 9, Petrona voided Santiago A.'s votes for Week 10.
- **^38**: As punishment for discussing nominations, Jenifer, Katia, Luciana and Luz votes towards Chiara and Jenifer were voided.
- **^39**: As Jenifer continued to share information from the outside world, and therefore breaking the rules regarding the isolation of the game, she was ejected by Gran Hermano on Day 67.
- **^40**: As punishment for discussing salvation and discussing who he would pick as the replacement nominee, Claudio's choice of saving Juan Pablo was nulled. In addition, his choice of nominating Lourdes for eviction was also nulled.
- **^41**: Following Jenifer's ejection, Giuliano replaced her as a new HouseGuest.
- **^42**: As punishment for sharing information from the outside world, Giuliano was automatically nominated for eviction.
- **^43**: Due to health reasons, Claudio left the house.
- **^44**: Following Claudio's medical removal, Delfina (who was in fourth place in the repechage) replaced him as a new HouseGuest.
- **^45**: As punishment for sharing information from the outside world, both Renato and Luca were automatically nominated for eviction without the possibility of being saved by the Head of Household.
- **^46**: The rules regarding the discussion of nominations were suspended until further notice.
- **^47**: This week the new HouseGuests including Delfina (who re-entered as Claudio's replacement) would nominate in the Diary Room, while the original HouseGuests would nominate face to face.
- **^48**: This week, Head of Household Lourdes had to nominate two HouseGuests (one of the originals and one of the newcomers) for eviction without the possibility of being saved. She chose Luz and Selva.
- **^49**: Following Brian's eviction, it was announced there would be no nominations. All HouseGuests except Sandra (who won the HoH competition) would face the public vote. The two HouseGuests with the fewest votes to save would be evicted.
- **^50**: As punishment for receiving information from the outside world, Lourdes and Luca were banned from this weeks HoH competition.
- **^51**: During the gala, the vote was frozen. The 10 HouseGuests with the most votes were safe. The other 10 HouseGuests remained nominated for eviction.
- **^52**: This week, Head of Household Sandra was given the chance to choose three of the bottom 10 HouseGuests to compete in a trivia challenge to earn safety from eviction. She chose Luciana, Katia, and Juan Pablo to compete. Katia won the trivia challenge and therefore was safe from eviction.
- **^53**: As there was no nominations in Week 12, Brian voided Luciana's votes for Week 13.
- **^54**: As Luca continued to share information from the outside world, and therefore breaking the rules regarding the isolation of the game, he was ejected by Gran Hermano on Day 85.
- **^55**: This week, Head of Household Chiara had votes count as doubled. She also won the right to nominate two HouseGuests without the possibility of being saved. She chose Juan Pablo and Katia.
- **^56**: As punishment for receiving information from the outside world, Sandra was automatically nominated.
- **^57**: As punishment for receiving information from the outside world, Head of Household Chiara lost her right to save and replace a HouseGuest. Furthermore her power nominations of Juan Pablo and Katia were voided. Finally she was automatically nominated for the next eviction.
- **^58**: As punishment for giving more information from the outside world, Renato was automatically nominated.
- **^59**: This week the original HouseGuests nominated in the Diary Room, while the new HouseGuests (including Renato) nominated face to face.
- **^60**: This week there was no nominations nor an eviction. Instead, the public voted to give two people (previously evicted HouseGuests or from previous seasons) a chance to enter the house via two Golden Tickets.
- **^61**: As there was no nominations in Week 14, Renato's voided Sandra's votes for Week 15.
- **^62**: Juan Pablo answered the Red Phone and had to nominate two HouseGuests for eviction, choosing Santiago A. and Luciana. He also had to choose one HouseGuest who also had to nominate two HouseGuests for eviction. He chose Lourdes who then nominated Santiago L. and Lorenzo for eviction.
- **^63**: This week, Head of Household Claudio had to nominate two HouseGuests for eviction without the possibility of being saved. He chose Marcelo and Ulises.
- **^64**: This week all HouseGuests except Claudio and Juliana nominated face to face.
- **^65**: As there was no eviction last week, this week had a double eviction. The two HouseGuests with the fewest votes to save were evicted.
- **^66**: As punishment for sharing information from the outside world, Claudio was automatically nominated for eviction without the possibility of being saved by the Head of Household. In addition he was also banned from competing in the next HoH competition.
- **^67**: Luciana answered the red phone and had to nominate one HouseGuest for eviction without the possibility of being saved. She chose Eugenia.
- **^68**: This week, Head of Household Juliana had to nominate one HouseGuests for eviction without the possibility of being saved. She chose Chiara.
- **^69**: This week seven HouseGuests were chosen at random to nominate face to face. Those HouseGuests were Claudio, Katia, Lourdes, Luciana, Selva, Santiago A., and Santiago L.
- **^70**: As punishment for hearing information from the outside world and talking about it in the house, Chiara, Juliana, Luz, Sandra, and Santiago L. were automatically nominated for eviction without the possibility of being saved by the Head of Household.
- **^71**: This week, Head of Household Ulises had nominate one HouseGuests for eviction without the possibility of being saved. He chose Lourdes. He also won the power to give a HouseGuest two extra points to use during Nominations. He chose Chiara.
- **^72**: Before nominations, Juliana decided to walk from the game and therefore did not nominate.
- **^73**: This week five HouseGuests were chosen at random to nominate face to face. Those HouseGuests were Chiara, Eugenia, Lucía, Luz, and Santiago L.
- **^74**: As punishment for discussing salvation and discussing who he would pick as the replacement nominee, Ulises's choice of saving Santiago A. was nulled. In addition, his choice of nominating Gabriela for eviction was also nulled.
- **^75**: On Day 116, Catalina entered the house as Juliana's replacement.
- **^76**: This week there was no nominations. Instead the HouseGuest who answered the red phone was automatically the New Head of Household and therefore is the only one safe from eviction. All other HouseGuests were automatically up for eviction. As Gabriela answered the red phone she was save from eviction.
- **^77**: As there was no nominations in Week 18, Santiago L. voided Santiago A.'s votes for Week 19.
- **^78**: This week, Head of Household Santiago A. had to nominate one HouseGuest for eviction without the possibility of being saved. He chose Ulises.
- **^79**: As punishment for moving during The Freeze, Eugenia was automatically nominated for eviction without the possibility of being saved by the Head of Household.
- **^80**: As punishment for sharing information from the outside world, Catalina was automatically nominated for eviction.
- **^81**: Santiago A. originally had Catalina as his replacement. However as she was automatically nominated, Santiago A. had to choose a new replacement nominee. He chose Chiara.
- **^82**: This week, Head of Household Gabriela had to nominate one HouseGuest for eviction without the possibility of being saved. She chose Luz.
- **^83**: As punishment for admitting that Ulises helped her during the trivia portion of this weeks Head of Household competition, Gabriela was dethroned as Head of Household with immediate effect. Furthermore, both Gabriela and Ulises were automatically nominated for eviction without the possibility of being saved. Finally, as Gabriela was dethroned, Luz was no longer nominated for eviction.
- **^84**: Following Gabriela's disqualification as Head of Household, the final portion of the Head of Household competition was replayed. It was won by Catalina.
- **^85**: This week, Head of Household Catalina had to nominate one HouseGuest for eviction without the possibility of being saved. She chose Luz.
- **^86**: As punishment for compromising the taste of food that was made by another HouseGuest, Catalina was dethroned as Head of Household and was automatically nominated for eviction without the possibility of being saved. Furthermore, the save and replace power was disabled for the week.
- **^87**: As he was the previous Head of Household, Santiago A. became the new HoH. However his power was limited and was still eligible to be nominated this week.
- **^88**: As Luz was already nominated for eviction, Lourdes's vote towards Luz was nulled.
- **^89**: This week there was no nominations. Instead all visitors except Alberto (who won the HoH competition) would face the public vote.
- **^90**: As punishment for discussing the outside world, Alberto was dethroned as Head of Household and therefore was eligible to be evicted along with the other visitors. As he was previous Head of Household, Santiago A. became the new Head of Household.
- **^91**: On Day 146, Katia's cousin Gisela decided to leave the house.
- **^92**: During The Freeze, boxes were scattered throughout the house. Alberto chose the box containing the power to evict one visitor. He chose to evict Giovanni.
- **^93**: The HouseGuests had to vote to evict one visitor from house. The visitors were also eligible to vote with the HouseGuests.
- **^94**: The HouseGuests had to vote for one visitor to be evicted. They chose Alberto.
- **^95**: As punishment for discussing the screams from outside the house, Chiara was automatically nominated for eviction without the possibility of being saved by the Head of Household.
- **^96**: As there was no nominations in Week 21, Catalina voided Eugenia votes for Week 22.
- **^97**: The final two visitors competed in a trivia challenge to win Head of Household for the HouseGuest they represent. As Pablo won the final challenge, Selva became the new Head of Household.
- **^98**: This week there was no nominations. All HouseGuests except Juan Pablo (who won the HoH competition) would face the public vote.
- **^99**: As there was no nominations in Week 23, Chiara voided Santiago A. votes for Week 24.
- **^100**: From Week 24 and onward, the save and replace power was no longer in play.
- **^101**: This week, Head of Household Santiago A. won the power to give a HouseGuest two extra points to use during Nominations. He chose Luz.
- **^102**: This week, at least five HouseGuests will faced the public vote instead of four.
- **^103**: As the power nomination was used on Juan Pablo, Sandra's vote towards him was voided.
- **^104**: During The Freeze, boxes were scattered throughout the house. Each box contained a prize or punishment. If the HouseGuest (Lourdes, Eugenia or Selva) who received a punishment or a prize for next week's nominations is evicted this week it will be voided and will not be given to another HouseGuest.
  - You are immune from being power nominated: Sandra
  - You are banned from competing in the next HoH competition: Katia
  - You will only have one vote to nominate next week: Lourdes
  - You are nominated next week: Eugenia
  - Your votes will count as doubled next week: Selva
  - You have won a bag of sweets: Luz
  - You have won an advantage at the next HoH competition: Ulises
  - You won a basket of fruits and vegetables: Santiago A.
  - You must choose one HouseGuest to have only one vote next week: Juan Pablo (He chose Sandra)
- **^105**: This week, former HouseGuests Andrea, Chiara, Giuliano, Jenifer, Luciana, Martina, Petrona, and Santiago L. returned to the house during nominations to team up with one of the eight finalists. The eight remaining HouseGuests must choose which former HouseGuest they want to partner up with. The pairings were:
  - Eugenia and Santiago L.
  - Juan Pablo and Giuliano
  - Katia and Petrona
  - Luz and Luciana
  - Sandra and Andrea
  - Santiago A. and Martina
  - Selva and Chiara
  - Ulises and Jenifer
- **^106**: As punishment for announcing her intention to use the Power Nomination, Sandra power nomination of Selva was nulled. Furthermore the power nomination was re-enabled for all HouseGuests except for Sandra. Finally, Sandra was banned from nominating again this week since she use her Power Nomination.
- **^107**: This week, former HouseGuests nominated along with the current HouseGuests.
- **^108**: From Week 27 and onward, the Head of Household was no longer immune from eviction. Instead the HoH votes will count as double during nominations.
- **^109**: As punishment for sharing information from the outside world with Eugenia, Santiago L. was removed from the house. Furthermore, Eugenia was banned from competing in the next Head of Household competition and will only be allowed one vote during nominations.
- **^110**: Both the Special Nomination and Power Nomination were disabled for the rest of the season.
- **^111**: Following Sandra's eviction, the voting was open for the public to vote for their favorite former HouseGuest. The former HouseGuest with the most votes wins a special prize and win immunity for their partner. As Chiara received the most votes, Selva earned immunity from eviction.
- **^112**: As punishment for sneaking in cigarettes and sharing information from the outside with Eugenia during a fight, Petrona was removed from the house and was no longer eligible for special prize. Furthermore, Katia was ineligible to become Head of Household for the week and will only have one vote for the week.
- **^113**: This week, Head of Household Juan Pablo won the power to give a HouseGuest two extra points to use during Nominations. He chose Eugenia. By choosing Eugenia, her punishment was nulled and therefore regain the power to nominate two HouseGuests instead of one.
- **^114**: For the final week, the public were voting for the winner of Gran Hermano.

== Production ==
=== Development ===
Gran Hermano is co-produced by production companies Kuarzo Entertainment Argentina and Banijay. The season was first confirmed on 3 July 2024. Host Santiago del Moro was also confirmed to return for the season. Casting for the season started on the same day of the announcement with open-call auditions held for people from up 18 years old. Applicants had to upload a presentation video and show their social networks.

=== Production design ===
The house is located in Martínez, Buenos Aires. As with previous seasons, the house is outfitted with 65 cameras and 87 microphones. With over 2,500 square metres, it would become the biggest house ever of Gran Hermano Argentina, including 1,200 m^{2} indoors, 400 m^{2} outdoors, a supermarket, and the "arena" in which the HouseGuests are expected to compete for games and challenges.

=== Prizes ===
The winner of the series, determined by the audience, will receive AR$ 70 million pesos (invested by Mercado Pago). The runner-up will receive AR$ 20 million pesos, the second runner-up will receive AR$ 10 million pesos, and the third runner-up receive a vacation trip for two to Bariloche. All four finalists will receive a motorcycle from Motomel while the HouseGuests who finish in the final three will each win a house from Roca Viviendas, and a year's worth of beer from Amstel.

== Release ==
=== Broadcast ===
The premiere of the twelfth season of Gran Hermano was broadcast on Telefe on 2 December 2024. The telecast received a 17.5 household rating. The most watched episode was the first part of season finale that aired on 24 June 2025 with a 19.8/72 HH rating/share. Throughout its broadcast, in same-day viewership, the season averaged a 12.7 HH rating.

The season airs from Sundays through Thursdays on Telefe, with nomination galas on Wednesdays, eviction galas on Sundays, debates on Mondays, Tuesdays and Thursdays, and a special edition called Night with the Exes (La Noche de los Ex in Spanish) hosted by Roberto Funes Ugarte, with former HouseGuests from previous seasons on Fridays. The debates are joined by panelists Laura Ubfal, Gastón Trezeguet, Sol Pérez, Eliana Guercio and Ceferino Reato, Costa, Pilar Smith and newcomer Marina Calabró.

Internationally, the season airs in simulcast in Uruguay on Canal 10.

=== Streaming services ===
DirecTV's video streaming service DGO was chosen to offer a 24-hour live feed of the house. Telefe airs in simulcast the season via YouTube and Twitch, hosted by Lucila Villar, Juan Ignacio Castañares and Diego Poggi.
