= Alika (singer) =

Uruguayan–Argentine musician

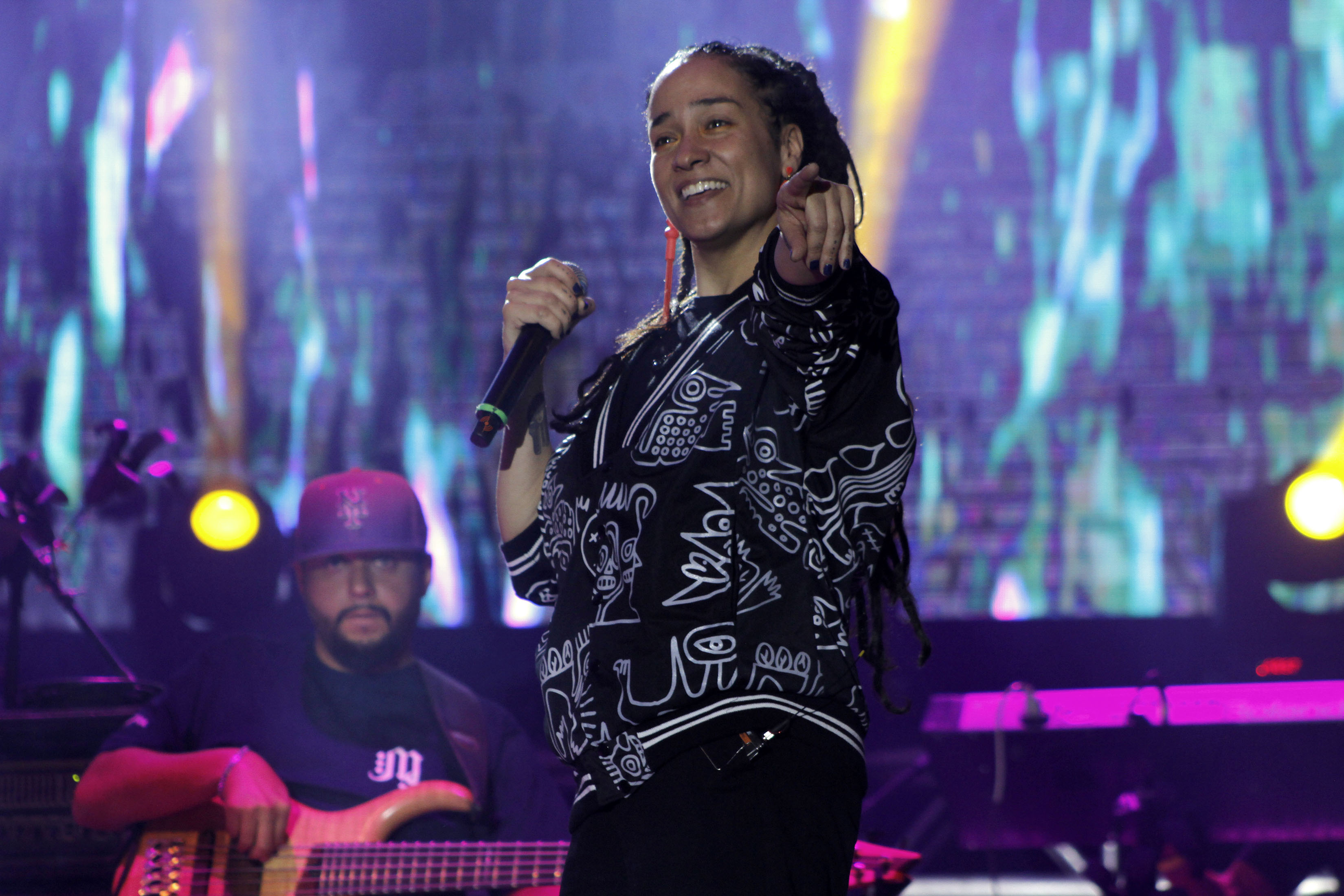
- Alika performing in Mexico City in 2019

Background information
- Born: 28 June 1977 (age 48); Montevideo, Uruguay
- Genres: Rap; reggae; dancehall
- Occupations: Singer; songwriter
- Years active: 1996–present
- Label: Irie Sudamérica
- Member of: Alika & Nueva Alianza

Alicia Dal Monte Campuzano (born 28 June 1977), better known by her stage name as Alika, is a Uruguayan–Argentine rapper, singer, songwriter, and reggae musician. She is better known for heading the reggae act Alika & Nueva Alianza.

== Background ==
Alicia Dal Monte Campuzano was born on 28 June 1977 in Montevideo, Uruguay, the daughter of a Paraguayan mother and a Uruguayan father. When she was six years old, her family moved to Argentina and settled in the town of El Jagüel, Buenos Aires Province. Later in life, she would take up residence in San Martín, Buenos Aires.

== Musical career ==
In 1994, she formed the duo Actitud María Marta alongside Malena D'Alessio. The duo became one of the earliest female rap bands in Argentina and Latin America in general. In 1995, the duo was recognized as the "Revelation Band" by Clarín's Sí magazine. Actitud María Marta released a single album, Acorralar a la Bestia, in 1996 under Polygram records. Alika would leave the duo following their album's release and subsequently grew closer to reggae and Rastafari culture.

In 1999, she started her solo project, inspired by Rastafari philosophy. Her lyrics reflected themes of respect, dignity, oppression under the Western capitalist system, realizations of self-worth, and life in the Third World in general and working-class neighborhoods in particular. Alongside MC Boomer, among other producers, she produced her first solo album No Dejes que te paren (released in 2001 under Indie) in Chile. 2001 was also the year she began performing live. In 2003, she released Sin Intermediarios, and, in 2006, she released Razón Meditación Acción.

In 2013, her collaboration with Argentine cumbia band La Liga, "Yo Tengo el Don", was featured in the video game Grand Theft Auto V, as part of the fictional East Los FM radio station in the game.

== Discography ==
With Actitud María Marta

- Acorralar a la bestia (1996)

As a solo artist

- No dejes que te paren (2001)
- Sin Intermediarios (2003)
- Razón Meditación Acción (2006)
- Educate Yourself (2008)
- Mad Professor Meets Alika (2009)
- Alika Live Niceto Club (2011)
- Unidad y Respeto Mixtape (2011)
- Dub Yourself (Remixes) (2012)
- Mi Palabra Mi Alma (2014)
