= Ticket office =

A Ticket office can refer to:

- An office where passengers can buy airline, bus or train tickets
- A box office where tickets are sold for admission to events
- An airline city ticket office
