= Esteban Echeverría Partido =

Esteban Echeverría Partido de Esteban Echeverría
- Department
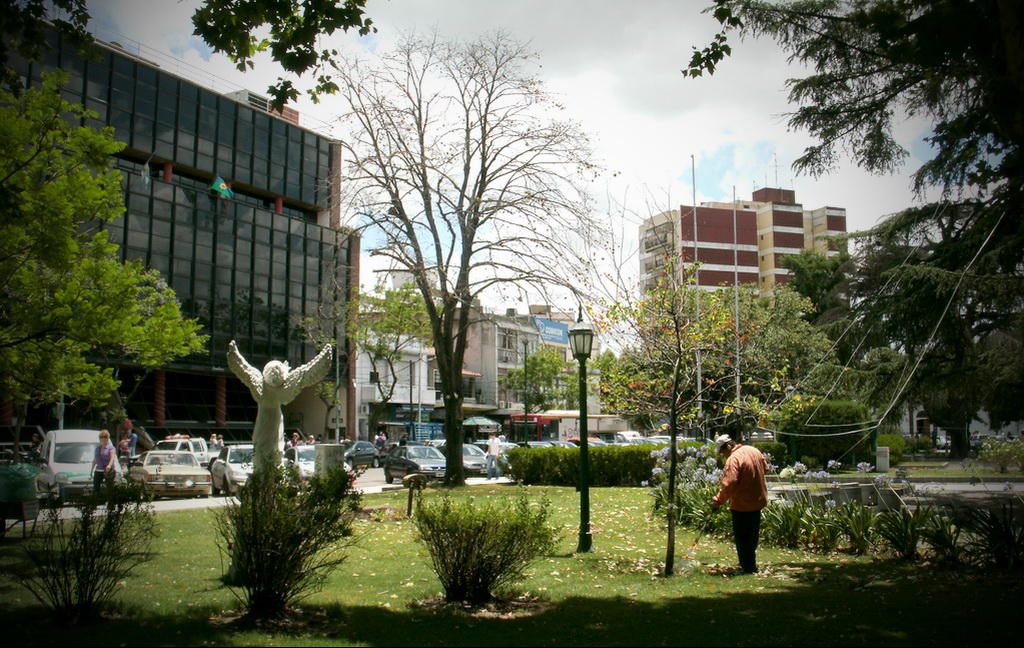

- location of Esteban Echeverría Partido in Gran Buenos Aires
- Coordinates: 34°48′S 58°28′W
- Country: Argentina
- Established: April 9, 1913
- Founder: provincial law 3467
- Seat: Monte Grande

Government
  - Intendant: Fernando Gray (Union for the Homeland)

Area
  - Total: 120 km^{2} (46 sq mi)

Population
  - Total: 300,959
  - Density: 2,500/km^{2} (6,500/sq mi)
- Demonym: echeverriense
- Postal Code: B1842
- IFAM: BUE037
- Area Code: 011
- Website: www.estebanecheverria.gob.ar

Esteban Echeverría Partido is a partido in the Gran Buenos Aires urban area, in Buenos Aires Province in Argentina.

The provincial subdivision has a population of 300,959 inhabitants in an area of 120 km^{2} (46 sq mi), and its capital city is Monte Grande, which is 29 km (18 mi) from Buenos Aires.

The partido is named after the poet and novelist Esteban Echeverría.

== Districts ==
- Monte Grande
- 9 de Abril
- Canning
- El Jagüel
- Luis Guillón

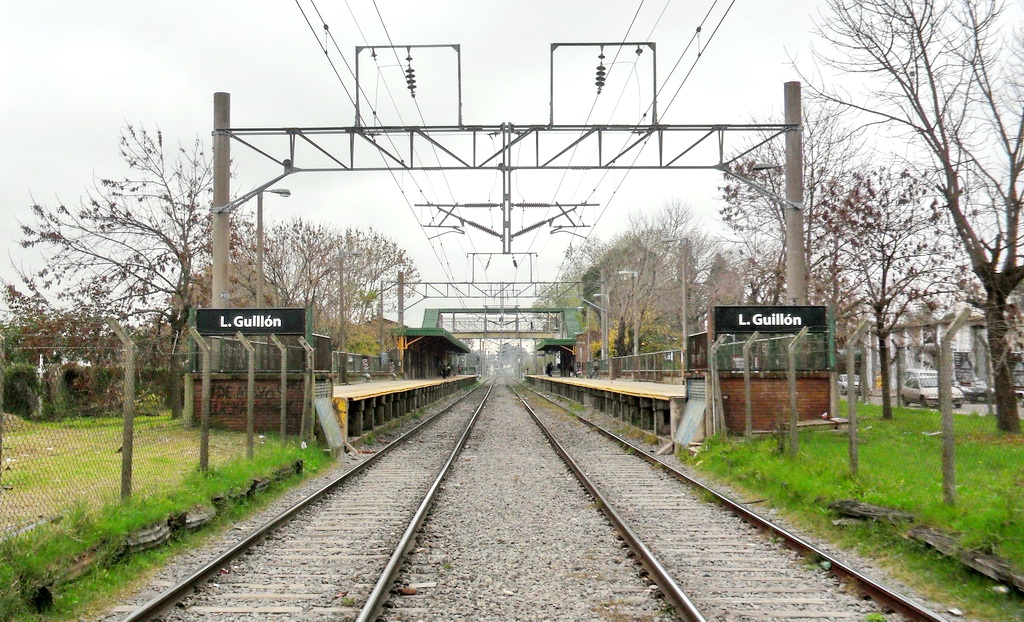
Station of trains Luis Guillón.Photo:Ramon Belozo.

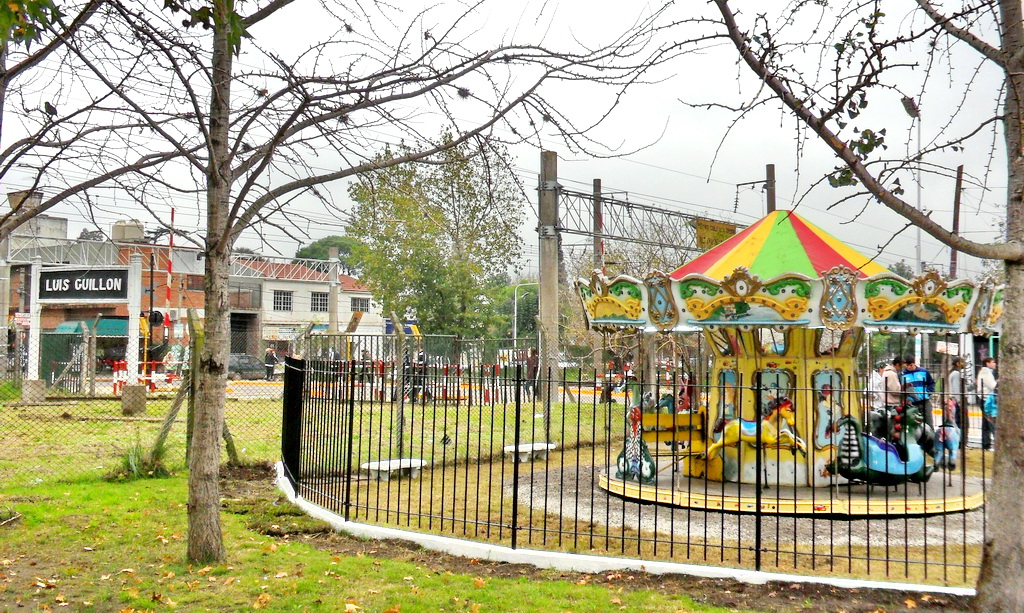
Carrucel in Luis Guillón.Photo:Ramon Belozo.
