= Tristán Suárez =

Town in Buenos Aires Province, Argentina

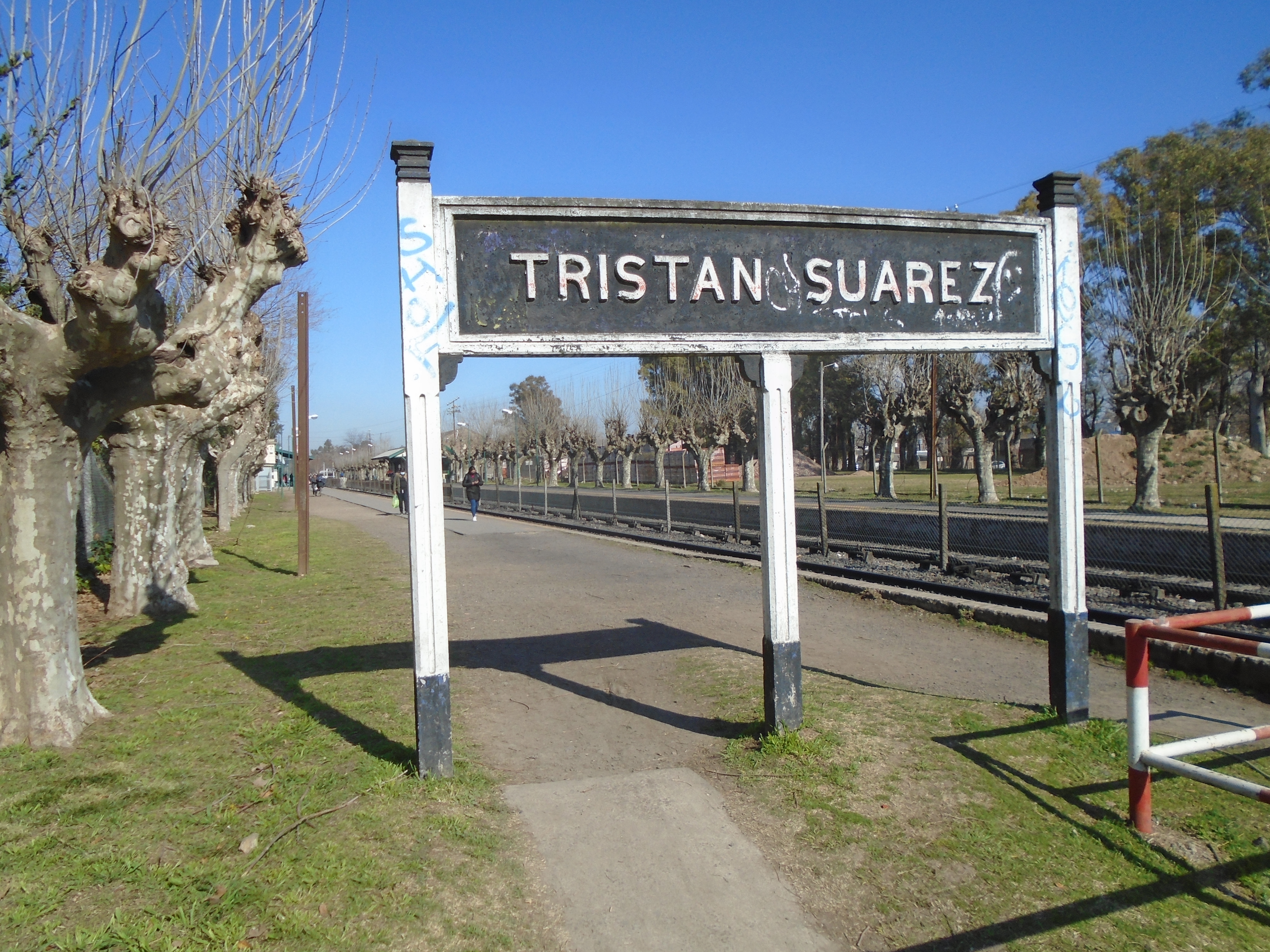

- Location in Greater Buenos Aires
- Coordinates: 34°52′S 58°34′W
- Country: Argentina
- Province: Buenos Aires
- Partido: Ezeiza
- Founded: July 16, 1885
- Elevation: 12 m (39 ft)

Population (2001 census [INDEC])
  - Total: 27,746
- CPA Base: B 1806
- Area code: +54 11

Tristán Suárez is a town in the Ezeiza Partido. Buenos Aires Province, Argentina. It forms part of the Greater Buenos Aires urban conurbation.

== Name ==
The town used to be called Llavallol but it was renamed in homage to railway pioneer Tristán Suárez.

== Sport ==
The town is home to football club C.S.D. Tristán Suárez, who play in the lower leagues of Argentine football.
