= La Unión, Buenos Aires =

City in Buenos Aires Province, Argentina

La Unión
- City
- Location in Greater Buenos Aires
- Coordinates: 34°53′S 58°34′W
- Country: Argentina
- Province: Buenos Aires
- Partido: Ezeiza
- Founded: June 24, 1912
- Elevation: 22 m (72 ft)

Population (2001 census [INDEC])
  - Total: 24,293
- CPA Base: B 1806
- Area code: +54 11

La Unión is a city in Greater Buenos Aires, Argentina, in the Ezeiza Partido.

== Parishes of the Catholic Church in La Unión ==
Catholic Church
Diocese	Lomas de Zamora
Parish	Nuestra Señora de Lourdes
