= Monte Grande Radio Station =

The Monte Grande Radio Station was a VLF transmission site for oversea wireless telegraphy in Monte Grande, near Buenos Aires, Argentina. The station was inaugurated on January 25, 1924, at the presence of then Argentine President Marcelo Torcuato de Alvear.

The station used a T-shaped antenna mounted on ten masts, two of them with a height of 219 metres and the other eight with a height of 210 metres. At the time of its inauguration, the radio transmitter was based on two Joly-Arco radio frequency alternators (400 kW and 500 kW, respectively) built by Telefunken/AEG.

The station operated on 23.6 kHz with 72.1 kW.
