= Carlos Spegazzini, Buenos Aires =

City in Buenos Aires Province, Argentina

Carlos Spegazzini
- City
- Flag Seal
- Location within Argentina
- Coordinates: 34°53′00″S 58°34′0″W
- Country: Argentina
- Province: Buenos Aires Province
- Partido: Ezeiza
- Founded: 1950

Government
  - Intendant: Alejandro Santiago Granados, PJ

Area
  - Total: 526,753 km^{2} (203,380 sq mi)
- Elevation: 12 m (39 ft)

Population (2001)
  - Total: 18,820
- Time zone: UTC−3 (ART)

Carlos Spegazzini is a city in Greater Buenos Aires, Argentina, in the Ezeiza Partido, and located in the center-southern part of it. It is named in honor of botanist Carlos Luigi Spegazzini.
