= Monte Grande =

City in Buenos Aires Province, Argentina

- City
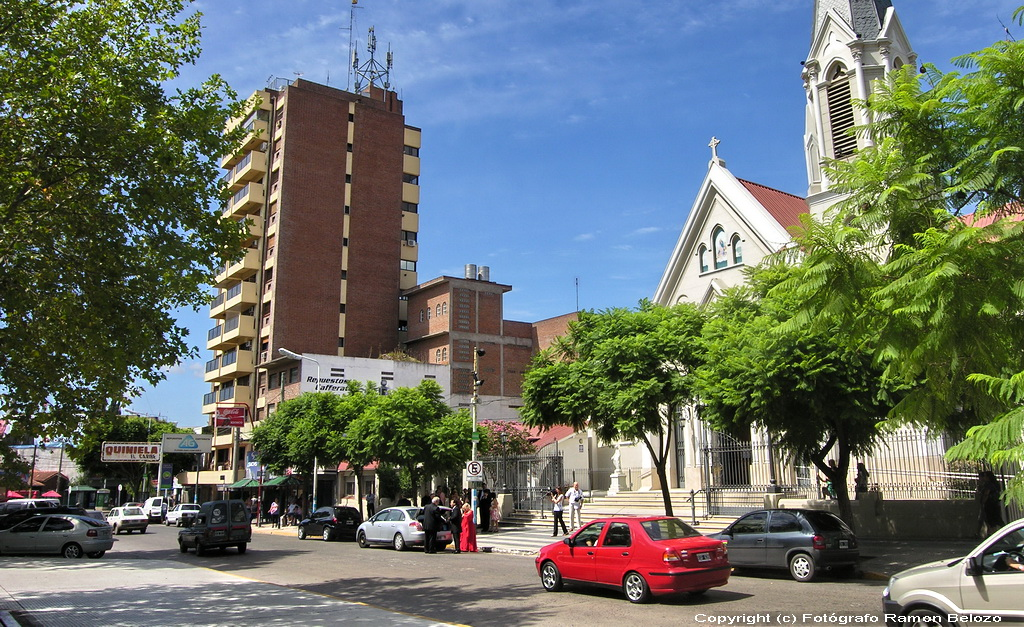

- Location within Greater Buenos Aires
- Coordinates: 34°49′37.9″S 58°27′43.3″W
- Country: Argentina
- Province: Buenos Aires
- Partido: Esteban Echeverría
- Founded: April 3, 1889
- Elevation: 17 m (56 ft)

Population (2001 census [INDEC])
  - Total: 109,644
  - Density: 4,858/km^{2} (12,580/sq mi)
- CPA Base: B 1842
- Area code: +54 11

Monte Grande is a city which forms part of the urban agglomeration of Greater Buenos Aires. It is the administrative seat of Esteban Echeverría Partido in Buenos Aires Province, Argentina.

== Demographics ==
It has an area of 22.57 km^{2} (8.71 sq mi) and a population of 109,644 inhabitants (2001 census [INDEC]).

== History ==
It was founded in 1824 as an agricultural colony. The government of Martín Rodríguez worked with William Parish Robertson to settle 500 Scottish immigrants in the town in the 1820s.

Named for the Pago de Monte Grande founded by a Spanish Empire Conquistador, the town initially grew around tala and ombú forests, to which vineyards and peach trees were later added. The Sociedad Coni, Sansinena y Cía., prominent Avellaneda-area saladero operators, purchased the land from the Fair family in 1889; Governor Máximo Paz signed a bill establishing Monte Grande on April 3 of that year. Among Monte Grande's first significant businesses were kiln opened by Coni & Sansinena, and the Bon Marché market.

Esteban Echeverría Partido was established in 1913, with Monte Grande as its county seat. A number of meat packing plants operated here during much of the 20th century, though these eventually closed. A Coca-Cola bottling plant and the Sofía Santamarina Hospital thus became two of the largest employers in the city, which became a bedroom community with a services-oriented economy.

In Monte Grande, there was an oversea telegraphy radio station.

== Gallery ==
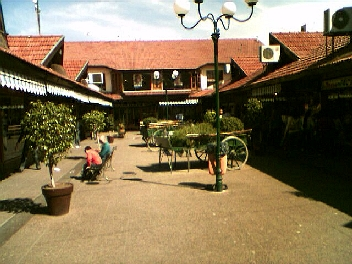
"Paseo Alem"

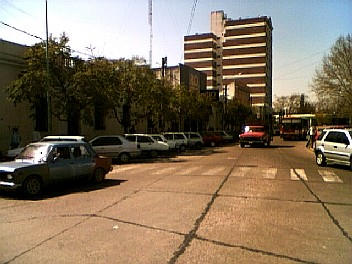
Civic Center

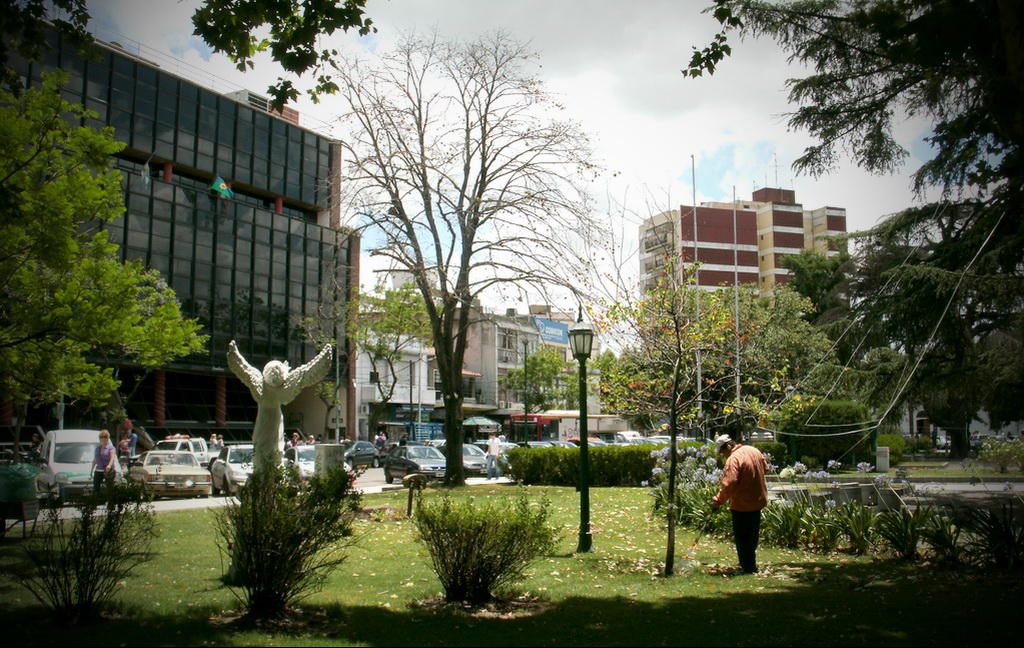
Mitre Square

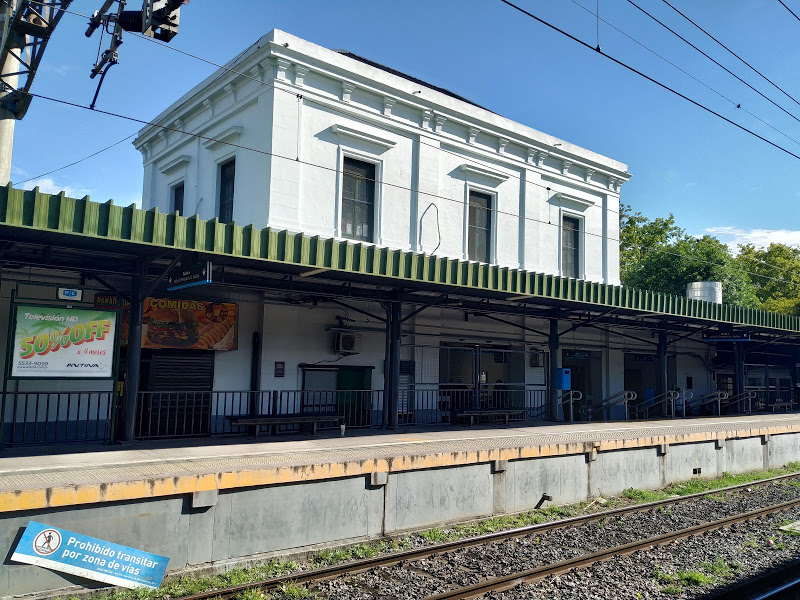
Train station
