= Ezeiza Partido =

Ezeiza Partido de José María Ezeiza
- Department
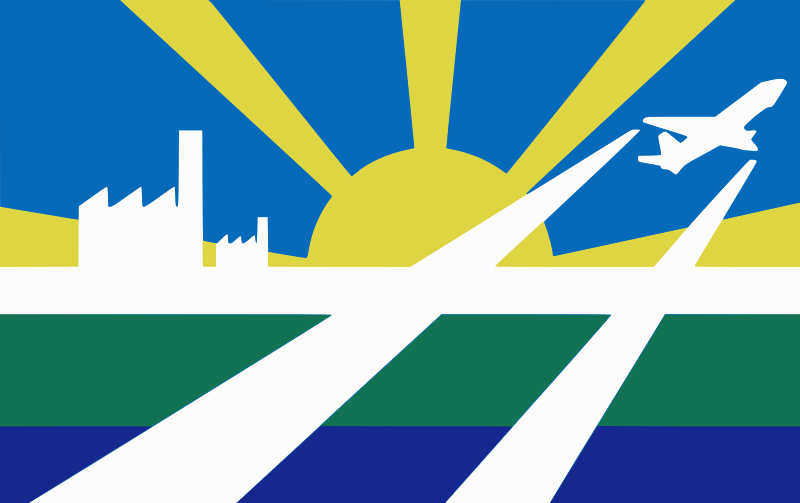
- Flag Logo

- location of Ezeiza Partido in Gran Buenos Aires
- Coordinates: 34°50′S 58°33′W
- Country: Argentina
- Established: October 20, 1995
- Founder: provincial law 11550
- Seat: Ezeiza

Government
  - Intendant: Gastón Granados (PJ)

Area
  - Total: 237 km^{2} (92 sq mi)

Population
  - Total: 160,219
  - Density: 676/km^{2} (1,750/sq mi)
- Demonym: ezeicense
- Postal Code: B1804
- IFAM: BUE039
- Area Code: 011
- Website: http://www.ezeiza.gov.ar/

Ezeiza Partido is a partido (second-level administrative subdivision) located in the southern part of Gran Buenos Aires in Buenos Aires Province, Argentina.

The provincial subdivision has a population of 160,219 inhabitants in an area of 237 km^{2} (92 sq mi), and its capital city is Ezeiza, which is located around 35 km (21.7 mi) from Buenos Aires. Ezeiza and its surroundings is an affluent area where many well-to-do people live. There are many gated communities in Ezeiza.

== Sports ==
This provincial subdivision is home to Club Social y Deportivo Tristán Suárez, a football club that play in the regionalised 3rd tier of Argentine football, Primera B Metropolitana.

== Districts ==
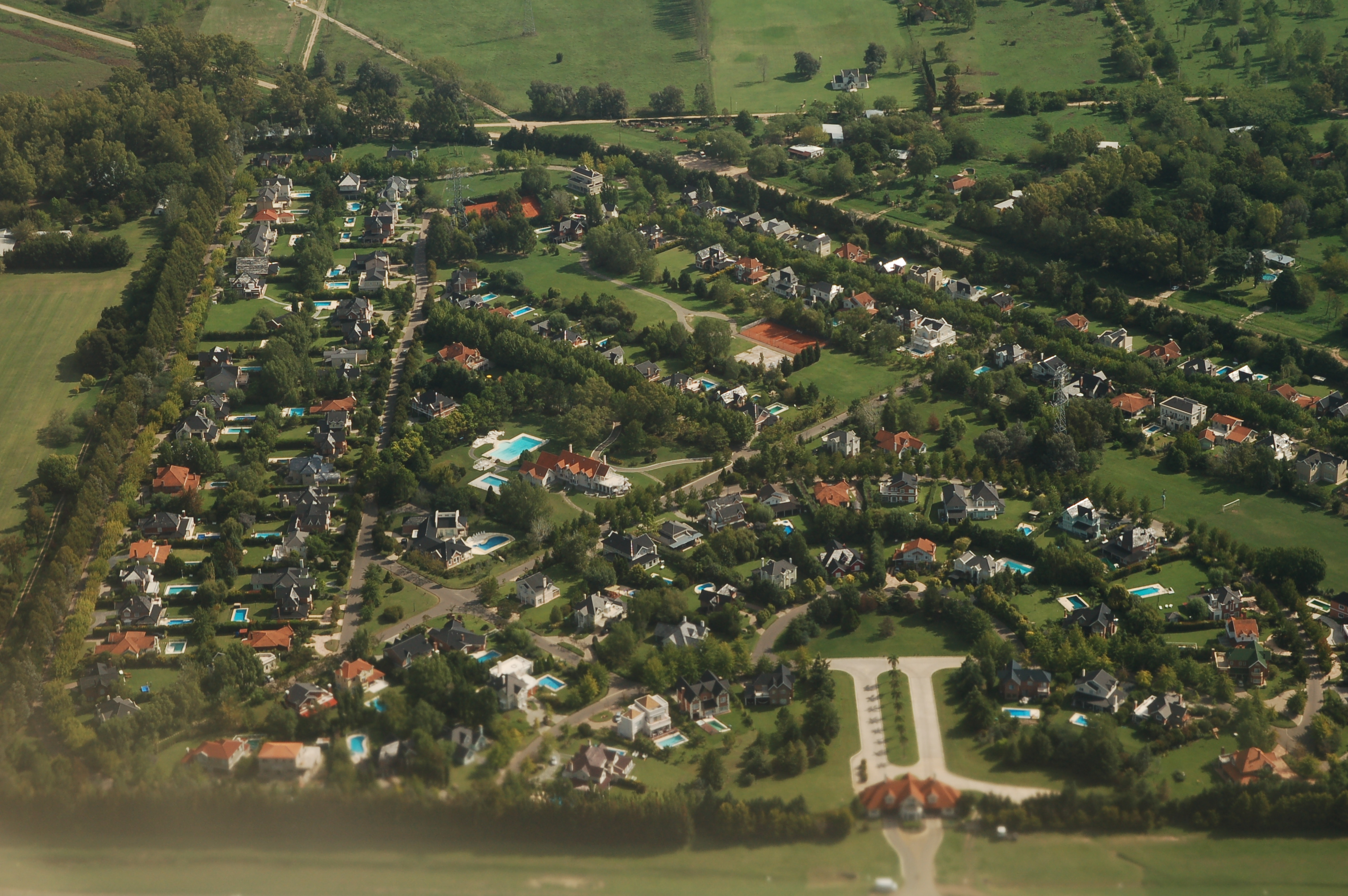
Gated community in Canning, south of Ezeiza.

- Ezeiza
- Tristán Suárez
- La Unión
- Carlos Spegazzini
- Canning
