= City ticket office =

Storefront airline ticket office

A city ticket office (CTO), booking office, or city ticket counter is a retail office for an airline, essentially a travel agency specializing in that particular carrier's flights. Until the 1990s, many major airlines had storefronts in luxury shopping districts. Today, few remain.

== Overview ==
When airlines used paper tickets, certain kinds of travel changes required in-person visits to these ticket offices to physically modify or exchange the ticket, but with the introduction of electronic tickets in 1994, their importance diminished and many were closed as passengers bought tickets over the internet instead.

City ticket offices were formerly very common worldwide. Although they are still common in many parts of the world, they have become rare in the United States. For example, American Airlines once had 110, but by 2017, only three remained. A few US airlines still maintain multiple ticket offices: as of 2021, Cape Air has 8.

As of 2007, the primary users of city ticket offices in the US were business travelers buying premium fares and recent immigrants, who often pay in cash.

City ticket offices were often found on major luxury shopping streets such as Regent Street, Fifth Avenue, the Champs-Élysées, Union Square (San Francisco), Via Veneto, and Wilshire Boulevard, along with cruise line sales offices and tourist offices; some were found inside luxury hotels. In New York City, airline ticket offices were concentrated on Fifth Avenue starting in the 1960s. In particular, British Airways and Japan Airlines were on Fifth Avenue, and Air France, Air India, and KLM were all in 666 Fifth Avenue. As of 1977, many of the Fifth Avenue offices, notably Delta and Air Canada, moved to Madison Avenue. In 1992, Air France moved to 125 West 55th Street.

The décor often included travel posters and model airplanes, as well as racks of brochures and schedules. Air India even included original artwork from India; the renowned artist Shanti Dave painted murals at booking offices in the 1950's and 1960's, including in New York, Los Angeles, Rome, Sydney, and Perth. Flag carriers' offices often promoted travel to their home country in general; some even sold souvenirs. Air France saw its ticket office design as a way of promoting French culture, and invested in designs by Charlotte Perriand and Pierre Gautier-Delaye for 70 ticket offices.
