= Canning, Argentina =

Town in Buenos Aires Province, Argentina

Coordinates: 34°53′S 58°31′W

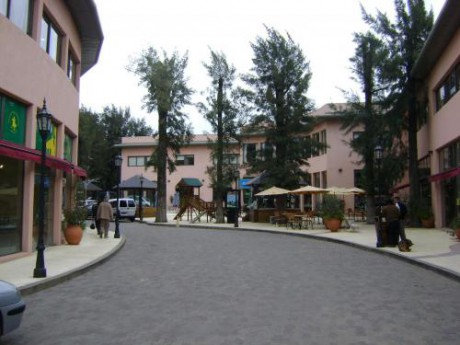
Mall at Canning, Buenos Aires

Canning is a town in Buenos Aires province, Argentina, divided between the partidos of Esteban Echeverría and Ezeiza, located between the two on Route 52. It is located southwest of the Buenos Aires metropolitan area and is fighting for independence from Ezeiza and E.Echeverría.Canning has had exponential growth due to residential developments and country clubs.

== Population ==
According to the latest census, it had 8,960 inhabitants (INDEC, 2001) of which 6,442 were in Esteban Echeverría and 2,518 in Ezeiza. Much of the population lives in gated communities.

== Neighborhoods ==
- Providence Resort & Country Club (Ezeiza)
- Don Marcelo (Esteban Echeverría)
- Flowers (Esteban Echeverría)
- Tranquility (Esteban Echeverría)
- Deer I (Esteban Echeverría)
- Deer II (Esteban Echeverría)
- Brickland (Esteban Echeverría)
- Mi Refugio (Esteban Echeverría)
- The Centaur (Esteban Echeverría)
- The Rodal (Esteban Echeverría)
- The Mist (Esteban Echeverría)
- Los Rosales (Esteban Echeverría)
- Echeverria Lake (Esteban Echeverría)
- Campos de Echeverria (Esteban Echeverria)
- Solar del Bosque (Ezeiza)
- St. Thomas (Esteban Echeverria)
- The country club Avacas (Esteban Echeverría)
- Blue field
- Dawns Canning (Esteban Echeverría)
- Sunrise Residence (Ezeiza)
- Sunrise Office (Ezeiza)
- Don Joaquín (Ezeiza)
