= 2013 Copa Sudamericana finals =

- Event: 2013 Copa Sudamericana
Ponte Preta	Lanús
(Brazil)	(Argentina)
1	3
- on aggregate

First leg
Ponte Preta	Lanús
1	1
- Date: 4 December 2013
- Venue: Estádio do Pacaembu, São Paulo
- Referee: Roberto Silvera (Uruguay)
- Attendance: 28,959

Second leg
Lanús	Ponte Preta
2	0
- Date: 11 December 2013
- Venue: Estadio Ciudad de Lanús, Lanús
- Referee: Enrique Osses (Chile)
- Attendance: 40,000

The 2013 Copa Sudamericana finals were the final two-legged tie that decided the winner of the 2013 Copa Sudamericana, the 12th edition of the Copa Sudamericana, South America's secondary international club football tournament organized through CONMEBOL.

The finals were contested in two-legged home-and-away format between Brazilian team Ponte Preta and Argentine team Lanús. The first leg was hosted by Ponte Preta at Estádio do Pacaembu in São Paulo on 4 December 2013, while the second leg was hosted by Lanús at Estadio Ciudad de Lanús in Lanús on 11 December. The winner qualified for the 2014 Copa Libertadores, and earned the right to play against the 2013 Copa Libertadores winners in the 2014 Recopa Sudamericana, and against the 2013 J. League Cup winners in the 2014 Suruga Bank Championship.

After the first leg ended in a 1–1 draw, Lanús won the second leg 2–0, to claim their first Copa Sudamericana title.

== Qualified teams ==
Team	Previous finals appearances (bold indicates winners)
(Brazil) Ponte Preta	None
(Argentina) Lanús	None

=== Road to the finals ===
Note: In all scores below, the score of the home team is given first.

(Brazil) Ponte Preta			Round	(Argentina) Lanús		
Opponent	Venue	Score	Elimination phase	Opponent	Venue	Score
Bye			First stage	Bye		
(Brazil) Criciúma (won 2–1 on aggregate)	Away	1–2	Second stage	(Argentina) Racing (won 4–1 on aggregate)	Away	1–2
(Brazil) Criciúma (won 2–1 on aggregate)	Home	0–0	Second stage	(Argentina) Racing (won 4–1 on aggregate)	Home	2–0
**Seed 14**			final stages	**Seed 10**		
(Colombia) Deportivo Pasto (won 2–1 on aggregate)	Home	2–0	Round of 16	Universidad de Chile (won 4–1 on aggregate)	Home	4–0
(Colombia) Deportivo Pasto (won 2–1 on aggregate)	Away	1–0	Round of 16	Universidad de Chile (won 4–1 on aggregate)	Away	1–0
(Argentina) Vélez Sarsfield (won 2–0 on aggregate)	Home	0–0	Quarterfinals	(Argentina) River Plate (won 3–1 on aggregate)	Home	0–0
(Argentina) Vélez Sarsfield (won 2–0 on aggregate)	Away	0–2	Quarterfinals	(Argentina) River Plate (won 3–1 on aggregate)	Away	1–3
(Brazil) São Paulo (won 4–2 on aggregate)	Away	1–3	Semifinals	(Paraguay) Libertad (won 4–2 on aggregate)	Away	1–2
(Brazil) São Paulo (won 4–2 on aggregate)	Home	1–1	Semifinals	(Paraguay) Libertad (won 4–2 on aggregate)	Home	2–1

== Format ==
The finals were played on a home-and-away two-legged basis, with the higher-seeded team hosting the second leg. If tied on aggregate, the away goals rule was not used, and 30 minutes of extra time were played. If still tied after extra time, a penalty shoot-out was used to determine the winner.

== Match details ==
=== First leg ===
2013 Copa Sudamericana finals
4 December 2013
21:50 UTC−2
First leg

Ponte Preta (Brazil)	1–1	(Argentina) Lanús
Fellipe Bastos 79'	Report	Goltz 58'

Estádio do Pacaembu, São Paulo
Attendance: 28,959
Referee: Roberto Silvera (Uruguay)

Ponte Preta	Lanús

GK	1	(Brazil) Roberto (c)
DF	2	(Brazil) Artur	(yellow card) 68'
DF	3	(Brazil) César
DF	4	(Brazil) Diego Sacoman	(yellow card) 18'
DF	6	(Brazil) Uendel	(yellow card) 90'
MF	5	(Brazil) Baraka
MF	8	(Brazil) Fernando Bob	(yellow card) 61'	(substituted off) 64'
MF	15	(Brazil) Fellipe Bastos
MF	10	(Brazil) Elias		(substituted off) 87'
FW	7	(Brazil) Rildo		(substituted off) 74'
FW	29	(Brazil) Leonardo
Substitutes:
GK	24	(Brazil) Édson Bastos
DF	13	(Brazil) Régis
DF	16	(Brazil) Ferron
MF	20	(Brazil) Magal		(substituted on) 87'
MF	11	(Brazil) Chiquinho		(substituted on) 74'
FW	27	(Brazil) Adaílton		(substituted on) 64'
FW	9	(Brazil) William
Manager:
(Brazil) Jorginho

GK	1	(Argentina) Agustín Marchesín
DF	4	(Argentina) Carlos Araujo
DF	2	(Argentina) Paolo Goltz (c)
DF	24	(Argentina) Carlos Izquierdoz	(yellow card) 77'
DF	6	(Argentina) Maximiliano Velázquez	(yellow card) 85'
MF	5	(Argentina) Diego González	(yellow card) 31'	(substituted off) 80'
MF	15	(Argentina) Leandro Somoza
MF	22	(Argentina) Jorge Ortiz
FW	26	(Argentina) Lucas Melano		(substituted off) 69'
FW	9	(Uruguay) Santiago Silva
FW	14	(Argentina) Jorge Pereyra Díaz	(yellow card) 55'	(substituted off) 88'
Substitutes:
GK	12	(Argentina) Esteban Andrada
DF	20	(Argentina) Facundo Monteseirín
MF	21	(Argentina) Nicolás Pasquini
MF	23	(Argentina) Oscar Benítez		(substituted on) 88'
MF	16	(Paraguay) Víctor Ayala		(substituted on) 69'
MF	8	(Argentina) Fernando Barrientos		(substituted on) 80'
FW	18	(Argentina) Ismael Blanco
Manager:
(Argentina) Guillermo Barros Schelotto

Assistant referees:
Mauricio Espinosa (Uruguay)
Marcelo Costa (Uruguay)
Fourth official:
Daniel Fedorczuk (Uruguay)

=== Second leg ===
11 December 2013
20:50 UTC−3
Second leg

Lanús (Argentina)	2–0	(Brazil) Ponte Preta
Ayala 25'; I. Blanco 45+3'	Report

Estadio Ciudad de Lanús, Lanús
Attendance: 40,000
Referee: Enrique Osses (Chile)

Lanús	Ponte Preta

GK	1	(Argentina) Agustín Marchesín
DF	4	(Argentina) Carlos Araujo
DF	2	(Argentina) Paolo Goltz (c)
DF	24	(Argentina) Carlos Izquierdoz
DF	6	(Argentina) Maximiliano Velázquez
MF	5	(Argentina) Diego González
MF	15	(Argentina) Leandro Somoza	(yellow card) 36'
MF	16	(Paraguay) Víctor Ayala	(yellow card) 26'
FW	18	(Argentina) Ismael Blanco	(yellow card) 75'	(substituted off) 78'
FW	9	(Uruguay) Santiago Silva
FW	23	(Argentina) Oscar Benítez		(substituted off) 90+2'
Substitutes:
GK	12	(Argentina) Esteban Andrada
DF	20	(Argentina) Facundo Monteseirín
DF	27	(Argentina) Matías Martínez
MF	21	(Argentina) Nicolás Pasquini		(substituted on) 90+2'
MF	22	(Argentina) Jorge Ortiz		(substituted on) 78'
MF	8	(Argentina) Fernando Barrientos
FW	26	(Argentina) Lucas Melano
Manager:
(Argentina) Guillermo Barros Schelotto

GK	1	(Brazil) Roberto (c)
DF	2	(Brazil) Artur		(substituted off) 57'
DF	3	(Brazil) César
DF	4	(Brazil) Diego Sacoman
DF	8	(Brazil) Fernando Bob
MF	5	(Brazil) Baraka
MF	20	(Brazil) Magal		(substituted off) 46'
MF	15	(Brazil) Fellipe Bastos	(yellow card) 86'
MF	10	(Brazil) Elias
FW	7	(Brazil) Rildo		(substituted off) 66'
FW	29	(Brazil) Leonardo
Substitutes:
GK	24	(Brazil) Édson Bastos
DF	13	(Brazil) Régis
DF	16	(Brazil) Ferron
MF	21	(Brazil) Ferrugem		(substituted on) 57'
MF	11	(Brazil) Chiquinho
FW	27	(Brazil) Adaílton		(substituted on) 46'
FW	9	(Brazil) William		(substituted on) 66'
Manager:
(Brazil) Jorginho

Assistant referees:
Carlos Astroza (Chile)
Sergio Roman (Chile)
Fourth official:
Julio Bascuñán (Chile)

== See also ==
- 2014 Recopa Sudamericana
- 2014 Suruga Bank Championship
