= 2013 Copa Sudamericana final stages =

The final stages of the 2013 Copa Sudamericana were played from September 18 to December 11, 2013. A total of 16 teams competed in the final stages.

== Draw ==
The draw of the tournament was held on July 3, 2013, 12:00 UTC−3, at the Sheraton Hotel in Buenos Aires, Argentina.

To determine the bracket starting from the round of 16, the defending champion and the 15 winners of the second stage were assigned a "seed" by draw. The defending champion and the winners from Argentina Zone and Brazil Zone were assigned even-numbered "seeds", and the winners from ties between South Zone and North Zone were assigned odd-numbered "seeds".

== Seeding ==
The following were the seeding of the 16 teams which qualified for the final stages, which included the defending champion (São Paulo) and the 15 winners of the second stage (three from Argentina Zone, four from Brazil Zone, eight from ties between South Zone and North Zone):

Seed	Team
1	(Chile) Universidad Católica
2	(Argentina) River Plate
3	(Colombia) Deportivo Pasto
4	(Brazil) Sport Recife
5	(Colombia) Itagüí
6	(Argentina) Vélez Sarsfield
7	Universidad de Chile
8	(Brazil) Bahia
9	(Colombia) Atlético Nacional
10	(Argentina) Lanús
11	(Colombia) La Equidad
12	(Brazil) Coritiba
13	(Paraguay) Libertad
14	(Brazil) Ponte Preta
15	(Ecuador) LDU Loja
16	(Brazil) São Paulo

== Format ==
In the final stages, the 16 teams played a single-elimination tournament, with the following rules:

- Each tie was played on a home-and-away two-legged basis, with the higher-seeded team hosting the second leg.
- In the round of 16, quarterfinals, and semifinals, if tied on aggregate, the away goals rule was used. If still tied, a penalty shoot-out was used to determine the winner (no extra time was played).
- In the finals, if tied on aggregate, the away goals rule was not used, and 30 minutes of extra time were played. If still tied after extra time, a penalty shoot-out was used to determine the winner.
- If there were two semifinalists from the same association, they had to play each other.

== Bracket ==
The bracket of the knockout stages was determined by the seeding as follows:

- Round of 16:
  - Match A: Seed 1 vs. Seed 16
  - Match B: Seed 2 vs. Seed 15
  - Match C: Seed 3 vs. Seed 14
  - Match D: Seed 4 vs. Seed 13
  - Match E: Seed 5 vs. Seed 12
  - Match F: Seed 6 vs. Seed 11
  - Match G: Seed 7 vs. Seed 10
  - Match H: Seed 8 vs. Seed 9
- Quarterfinals:
  - Match S1: Winner A vs. Winner H
  - Match S2: Winner B vs. Winner G
  - Match S3: Winner C vs. Winner F
  - Match S4: Winner D vs. Winner E
- Semifinals: (if there were two semifinalists from the same association, they must play each other)
  - Match F1: Winner S1 vs. Winner S4
  - Match F2: Winner S2 vs. Winner S3
- Finals: Winner F1 vs. Winner F2

Round of 16
16	(Brazil) São Paulo	1	4	5
1	(Chile) Universidad Católica	1	3	4
9	(Colombia) Atlético Nacional (p)	1	0	1 (4)
8	(Brazil) Bahia	0	1	1 (3)
14	(Brazil) Ponte Preta	2	0	2
3	(Colombia) Deportivo Pasto	0	1	1
11	(Colombia) La Equidad	1	1	2
6	(Argentina) Vélez Sarsfield	2	2	4
13	(Paraguay) Libertad	2	2	4
4	(Brazil) Sport Recife	0	1	1
12	(Brazil) Coritiba	0	1	1
5	(Colombia) Itagüí	1	2	3
10	(Argentina) Lanús	4	0	4
7	Universidad de Chile	0	1	1
15	(Ecuador) LDU Loja	2	0	2
2	(Argentina) River Plate	1	2	3

Quarterfinals
16	(Brazil) São Paulo	3	0	3
9	(Colombia) Atlético Nacional	2	0	2
14	(Brazil) Ponte Preta	0	2	2
6	(Argentina) Vélez Sarsfield	0	0	0
13	(Paraguay) Libertad	2	0	2
5	(Colombia) Itagüí	0	1	1
10	(Argentina) Lanús	0	3	3
2	(Argentina) River Plate	0	1	1

Semifinals
16	(Brazil) São Paulo	1	1	2
14	(Brazil) Ponte Preta	3	1	4
13	(Paraguay) Libertad	1	1	2
10	(Argentina) Lanús	2	2	4

Finals
14	(Brazil) Ponte Preta	1	0	1
10	(Argentina) Lanús	1	2	3

Note: The bracket was changed according to the rules of the tournament so that the two semifinalists from Brazil would play each other.

== Round of 16 ==
The first legs were played on September 18–19 and 24–26, and the second legs were played on September 25–26, October 2 and 22–24, 2013.

Team 1	Agg.	Team 2	1st leg	2nd leg
São Paulo (Brazil)	5–4	(Chile) Universidad Católica	1–1	4–3
LDU Loja (Ecuador)	2–3	(Argentina) River Plate	2–1	0–2
Ponte Preta (Brazil)	2–1	(Colombia) Deportivo Pasto	2–0	0–1
Libertad (Paraguay)	4–1	(Brazil) Sport Recife	2–0	2–1
Coritiba (Brazil)	1–3	(Colombia) Itagüí	0–1	1–2
La Equidad (Colombia)	2–4	(Argentina) Vélez Sarsfield	1–2	1–2
Lanús (Argentina)	4–1	Universidad de Chile	4–0	0–1
Atlético Nacional (Colombia)	1–1 (4–3 p)	(Brazil) Bahia	1–0	0–1

=== Match A ===
September 26, 2013
22:00 UTC−3

São Paulo (Brazil)	1–1	(Chile) Universidad Católica
Luís Fabiano 18'	Report	Castillo 41'

Estádio do Morumbi, São Paulo
Attendance: 12,342
Referee: Darío Ubriaco (Uruguay)

October 23, 2013
20:50 UTC−3

Universidad Católica (Chile)	3–4	(Brazil) São Paulo
Sosa 17'; Cordero 23'; Mirošević 71' (pen.)	Report	Aloísio 19', 24'; Ademilson 65'; Welliton 86'

Estadio San Carlos de Apoquindo, Santiago
Attendance: 11,155
Referee: Antonio Arias (Paraguay)

São Paulo won 5–4 on aggregate.

=== Match B ===
September 19, 2013
19:15 UTC−5

LDU Loja (Ecuador)	2–1	(Argentina) River Plate
Larrea 33'; Uchuari 65' (pen.)	Report	Ferreyra 59'

Estadio Federativo Reina del Cisne, Loja
Attendance: 8,189
Referee: Hernando Buitrago (Colombia)

September 26, 2013
19:30 UTC−3

River Plate (Argentina)	2–0	(Ecuador) LDU Loja
Gutiérrez 37'; Lanzini 71'	Report

Estadio Monumental Antonio Vespucio Liberti, Buenos Aires
Attendance: 34,201
Referee: Julio Quintana (Paraguay)

River Plate won 3–2 on aggregate.

=== Match C ===
September 25, 2013
19:30 UTC−3

Ponte Preta (Brazil)	2–0	(Colombia) Deportivo Pasto
Uendel 31'; Fellipe Bastos 90+8'	Report

Estádio Moisés Lucarelli, Campinas
Attendance: 14,409
Referee: Julio Bascuñán (Chile)

October 22, 2013
19:15 UTC−5

Deportivo Pasto (Colombia)	1–0	(Brazil) Ponte Preta
Mina 53'	Report

Estadio Departamental Libertad, Pasto
Attendance: 10,871
Referee: Marlon Escalante (Venezuela)

Ponte Preta won 2–1 on aggregate.

=== Match D ===
September 25, 2013
20:50 UTC−4

Libertad (Paraguay)	2–0	(Brazil) Sport Recife
Gómez 10'; P. Benítez 39'	Report

Estadio Feliciano Cáceres, Luque
Attendance: 5,128
Referee: Saúl Laverni (Argentina)

October 23, 2013
21:10 UTC−3

Sport Recife (Brazil)	1–2	(Paraguay) Libertad
Ailson 47'	Report	J. González 42', 51'

Itaipava Arena Pernambuco, São Lourenço da Mata
Attendance: 17,575
Referee: Darío Ubriaco (Uruguay)

Libertad won 4–1 on aggregate.

=== Match E ===
September 24, 2013
21:00 UTC−3

Coritiba (Brazil)	0–1	(Colombia) Itagüí
	Report	Mena 46'

Estádio Couto Pereira, Curitiba
Attendance: 9,192
Referee: Oscar Maldonado (Bolivia)

October 24, 2013
20:00 UTC−5

Itagüí (Colombia)	2–1	(Brazil) Coritiba
Quiñones 64', 90+1'	Report	Chico 45+4'

Estadio Polideportivo Sur, Envigado
Attendance: 4,981
Referee: Carlos Vera (Ecuador)

Itagüí won 3–1 on aggregate.

=== Match F ===
September 18, 2013
20:30 UTC−5

La Equidad (Colombia)	1–2	(Argentina) Vélez Sarsfield
Rivas 76'	Report	Zárate 53'; Cabral 81'

Estadio Metropolitano de Techo, Bogotá
Attendance: 1,935
Referee: Roberto Silvera (Uruguay)

October 2, 2013
21:15 UTC−3

Vélez Sarsfield (Argentina)	2–1	(Colombia) La Equidad
Pratto 71'; Zárate 86'	Report	Moreno 45+1'

Estadio José Amalfitani, Buenos Aires
Attendance: 22,846
Referee: Patricio Polic (Chile)

Vélez Sarsfield won 4–2 on aggregate.

=== Match G ===
September 18, 2013
20:15 UTC−3

Lanús (Argentina)	4–0	Universidad de Chile
Silva 24'; Melano 31', 32'; Acosta 68'	Report

Estadio Ciudad de Lanús, Lanús
Attendance: 23,702
Referee: Carlos Amarilla (Paraguay)

September 25, 2013
19:30 UTC−3

Universidad de Chile	1–0	(Argentina) Lanús
Aránguiz 69'	Report

Estadio Nacional Julio Martínez Prádanos, Santiago
Attendance: 16,228
Referee: Héber Lopes (Brazil)

Lanús won 4–1 on aggregate.

=== Match H ===
September 26, 2013
20:00 UTC−5

Atlético Nacional (Colombia)	1–0	(Brazil) Bahia
Diones 12' (o.g.)	Report

Estadio Atanasio Girardot, Medellín
Attendance: 14,987
Referee: Roddy Zambrano (Ecuador)

October 24, 2013
19:30 UTC−3

Bahia (Brazil)	1–0	(Colombia) Atlético Nacional
Hélder 6'	Report
Penalties
Marquinhos (penalty scored); Souza (penalty missed); Talisca (penalty scored); Fabrício Lusa (penalty missed); Fahel (penalty scored)	3–4	(penalty scored) Medina; (penalty missed) Cárdenas; (penalty scored) J. Valencia; (penalty scored) Uribe; (penalty scored) Bernal

Arena Fonte Nova, Salvador
Attendance: 9,408
Referee: Diego Abal (Argentina)

Tied 1–1 on aggregate, Atlético Nacional won on penalties.

== Quarterfinals ==
The first legs were played on October 29–31, and the second legs were played on November 6–7, 2013.

Team 1	Agg.	Team 2	1st leg	2nd leg
São Paulo (Brazil)	3–2	(Colombia) Atlético Nacional	3–2	0–0
Lanús (Argentina)	3–1	(Argentina) River Plate	0–0	3–1
Ponte Preta (Brazil)	2–0	(Argentina) Vélez Sarsfield	0–0	2–0
Libertad (Paraguay)	2–1	(Colombia) Itagüí	2–0	0–1

=== Match S1 ===
October 30, 2013
21:50 UTC−2

São Paulo (Brazil)	3−2	(Colombia) Atlético Nacional
Jádson 14'; Antônio Carlos 72', 90+1'	Report	Uribe 40'; Duque 79'

Estádio do Morumbi, São Paulo
Attendance: 22,441
Referee: Víctor Hugo Carrillo (Peru)

November 6, 2013
18:50 UTC−5

Atlético Nacional (Colombia)	0–0	(Brazil) São Paulo
	Report

Estadio Atanasio Girardot, Medellín
Attendance: 43,168
Referee: Enrique Osses (Chile)

São Paulo won 3–2 on aggregate.

=== Match S2 ===
October 29, 2013
20:15 UTC−3

Lanús (Argentina)	0–0	(Argentina) River Plate
	Report

Estadio Ciudad de Lanús, Lanús
Attendance: 32,951
Referee: Silvio Trucco (Argentina)

November 6, 2013
20:50 UTC−3

River Plate (Argentina)	1–3	(Argentina) Lanús
Gutiérrez 83'	Report	D. H. González 7'; Silva 32'; Ayala 72'

Estadio Monumental Antonio Vespucio Liberti, Buenos Aires
Attendance: 38,928
Referee: Diego Abal (Argentina)

Lanús won 3–1 on aggregate.

=== Match S3 ===
October 31, 2013
20:15 UTC−2

Ponte Preta (Brazil)	0–0	(Argentina) Vélez Sarsfield
	Report

Estádio Moisés Lucarelli, Campinas
Attendance: 12,506
Referee: Darío Ubriaco (Uruguay)

November 7, 2013
19:45 UTC−3

Vélez Sarsfield (Argentina)	0–2	(Brazil) Ponte Preta
	Report	Elias 49'; Fernando Bob 90+4'

Estadio José Amalfitani, Buenos Aires
Attendance: 27,486
Referee: Wilmar Roldán (Colombia)

Ponte Preta won 2–0 on aggregate.

=== Match S4 ===
October 31, 2013
21:30 UTC−3

Libertad (Paraguay)	2–0	(Colombia) Itagüí
Molinas 39'; Recalde 44'	Report

Estadio Dr. Nicolás Léoz, Asunción
Attendance: 7,637
Referee: Sandro Ricci (Brazil)

November 7, 2013
20:15 UTC−5

Itagüí (Colombia)	1–0	(Paraguay) Libertad
Bolívar 19'	Report

Estadio Polideportivo Sur, Envigado
Attendance: 4,829
Referee: Roberto Silvera (Uruguay)

Libertad won 2–1 on aggregate.

== Semifinals ==
The first legs were played on November 20–21, and the second legs were played on November 27–28, 2013.

A minute of silence was held in honor to the passing of two-time World Cup-winning Brazilian player Nílton Santos at both second leg games of the semifinals.

Team 1	Agg.	Team 2	1st leg	2nd leg
São Paulo (Brazil)	2–4	(Brazil) Ponte Preta	1–3	1–1
Libertad (Paraguay)	2–4	(Argentina) Lanús	1–2	1–2

=== Match F1 ===
November 20, 2013
21:50 UTC−2

São Paulo (Brazil)	1–3	(Brazil) Ponte Preta
Ganso 21'	Report	Antônio Carlos 45' (o.g.); Leonardo 54'; Uendel 71'

Estádio do Morumbi, São Paulo
Attendance: 53,302
Referee: Diego Abal (Argentina)

November 27, 2013
21:50 UTC−2

Ponte Preta (Brazil)	1–1	(Brazil) São Paulo
Leonardo 43'	Report	Luís Fabiano 84'

Estádio Romildo Vitor Gomes Ferreira, Mogi Mirim
Attendance: 12,161
Referee: Carlos Vera (Ecuador)

Ponte Preta won 4–2 on aggregate.

=== Match F2 ===
November 21, 2013
21:15 UTC−3

Libertad (Paraguay)	1–2	(Argentina) Lanús
Gómez 81'	Report	Silva 55'; Goltz 63' (pen.)

Estadio Dr. Nicolás Léoz, Asunción
Attendance: 15,564
Referee: Darío Ubriaco (Uruguay)

November 28, 2013
21:15 UTC−3

Lanús (Argentina)	2–1	(Paraguay) Libertad
D. H. González 13'; Goltz 58' (pen.)	Report	J. González 54'

Estadio Ciudad de Lanús, Lanús
Attendance: 33,500
Referee: Víctor Hugo Carrillo (Peru)

Lanús won 4–2 on aggregate.

== Finals ==
The finals were played on a home-and-away two-legged basis, with the higher-seeded team hosting the second leg. If tied on aggregate, the away goals rule was not used, and 30 minutes of extra time were played. If still tied after extra time, a penalty shoot-out was used to determine the winner.

The first leg was played on December 4, and the second leg was played on December 11, 2013.

December 4, 2013
21:50 UTC−2

Ponte Preta (Brazil)	1–1	(Argentina) Lanús
Fellipe Bastos 79'	Report	Goltz 58'

Estádio do Pacaembu, São Paulo
Attendance: 28,959
Referee: Roberto Silvera (Uruguay)

December 11, 2013
20:50 UTC−3

Lanús (Argentina)	2–0	(Brazil) Ponte Preta
Ayala 25'; I. Blanco 45+3'	Report

Estadio Ciudad de Lanús, Lanús
Attendance: 40,000
Referee: Enrique Osses (Chile)

Lanús won 3–1 on aggregate.
