= 2014 Recopa Sudamericana =

Recopa Santander Sudamericana 2014 Recopa Santander Sul-Americana 2014
- Event: Recopa Sudamericana
Lanús	Atlético Mineiro
(Argentina)	(Brazil)
3	5
- on aggregate

First leg
Lanús	Atlético Mineiro
0	1
- Date: July 16, 2014
- Venue: Estadio Ciudad de Lanús, Lanús
- Referee: Antonio Arias (Paraguay)

Second leg
Atlético Mineiro	Lanús
4	3
- After extra time
- Date: July 23, 2014
- Venue: Estádio Mineirão, Belo Horizonte
- Referee: Roberto Silvera (Uruguay)

The 2014 Recopa Sudamericana (officially the 2014 Recopa Santander Sudamericana for sponsorship reasons) was the 22nd edition of the Recopa Sudamericana, the football competition organized by CONMEBOL between the winners of the previous season's two major South American club tournaments, the Copa Libertadores and the Copa Sudamericana.

The competition was contested in two-legged home-and-away format between Brazilian team Atlético Mineiro, the 2013 Copa Libertadores champion, and Argentine team Lanús, the 2013 Copa Sudamericana champion. The first leg was hosted by Lanús at Estadio Ciudad de Lanús in Lanús on July 16, 2014, while the second leg was hosted by Atlético Mineiro at Estádio Mineirão in Belo Horizonte on July 23, 2014.

In the first leg, the visitors Atlético Mineiro won by a score of 1–0. In the second leg, the score was 3–2 in favour of Lanús after 90 minutes, meaning the title would be decided by extra time. Atlético Mineiro were crowned Recopa Sudamericana champion for the first time after two own goals in extra time gave them a 4–3 win (5–3 on aggregate).

== Qualified teams ==
Team	Qualification	Previous app.
(Brazil) Atlético Mineiro	2013 Copa Libertadores champion	None
(Argentina) Lanús	2013 Copa Sudamericana champion	None

Bold indicates winning years

== Format ==
The Recopa Sudamericana was played on a home-and-away two-legged basis, with the Copa Libertadores champion hosting the second leg. If tied on aggregate, the away goals rule was not used, and 30 minutes of extra time were played. If still tied after extra time, a penalty shoot-out was used to determine the winner.

== Match details ==
=== First leg ===
2014 Recopa Sudamericana
July 16, 2014
22:00 UTC−3
First leg

Lanús (Argentina)	0–1	(Brazil) Atlético Mineiro
	Report	Diego Tardelli 65'

Estadio Ciudad de Lanús, Lanús
Attendance: 12,000
Referee: Antonio Arias (Paraguay)

**Lanús**	**Atlético Mineiro**

GK	1	(Argentina) Agustín Marchesín
DF	4	(Argentina) Carlos Araujo
DF	14	(Paraguay) Gustavo Gómez	(yellow card) 71'
DF	2	(Argentina) Diego Braghieri
DF	6	(Argentina) Maximiliano Velázquez (c)	(yellow card) 85'
MF	5	(Argentina) Diego González
MF	15	(Argentina) Leandro Somoza
MF	16	(Paraguay) Víctor Ayala		(substituted off) 64'
FW	18	(Argentina) Lucas Melano		(substituted off) 56'
FW	9	(Uruguay) Santiago Silva
FW	23	(Argentina) Oscar Benítez	(yellow card) 63'	(substituted off) 76'
Substitutes:
GK	12	(Argentina) Matías Ibáñez
DF	24	(Argentina) Matías Martínez
DF	3	(Uruguay) Alejandro Silva		(substituted on) 76'
MF	21	(Argentina) Nicolás Pasquini
MF	22	(Argentina) Jorge Ortiz		(substituted on) 64'
MF	11	(Argentina) Jorge Valdez Chamorro
FW	7	(Argentina) Lautaro Acosta		(substituted on) 56'
Manager:
(Argentina) Guillermo Barros Schelotto

GK	1	(Brazil) Victor
DF	2	(Brazil) Marcos Rocha
DF	3	(Brazil) Leonardo Silva (c)
DF	14	(Brazil) Jemerson	(yellow card) 89'
DF	19	(Brazil) Emerson Conceição	(yellow card) 21'
MF	5	(Brazil) Pierre	(yellow card) 59'
MF	8	(Brazil) Leandro Donizete
MF	10	(Brazil) Ronaldinho		(substituted off) 46'
MF	11	(Brazil) Maicosuel
FW	9	(Brazil) Diego Tardelli
FW	21	(Brazil) André		(substituted off) 46'
Substitutes:
GK	12	(Brazil) Giovanni
DF	20	(Brazil) Alex Silva
FW	17	(Brazil) Guilherme	(yellow card) 62'	(substituted on) 46'
MF	25	(Brazil) Josué
FW	7	(Brazil) Jô		(substituted on) 46'
MF	23	(Argentina) Jesús Dátolo
FW	18	(Brazil) Luan
Manager:
(Brazil) Levir Culpi

Assistant referees:
Carlos Cáceres (Paraguay)
Dario Gaona (Paraguay)
Fourth official:
Julio Quintana (Paraguay)

=== Second leg ===
July 23, 2014
22:00 UTC−3
Second leg

Atlético Mineiro (Brazil)	4–3 (a.e.t.)	(Argentina) Lanús
Diego Tardelli 6' (pen.); Maicosuel 37'; Gómez 102' (o.g.); Ayala 111' (o.g.)	Report	Ayala 8'; S. Silva 25'; Acosta 90+3'

Estádio Mineirão, Belo Horizonte
Attendance: 54,786
Referee: Roberto Silvera (Uruguay)

**Atlético Mineiro**	**Lanús**

GK	1	(Brazil) Victor
DF	2	(Brazil) Marcos Rocha
DF	4	(Brazil) Réver	(yellow card) 96'
DF	3	(Brazil) Leonardo Silva (c)
DF	19	(Brazil) Emerson Conceição
MF	5	(Brazil) Pierre	(yellow card) 18'
MF	8	(Brazil) Leandro Donizete	(yellow card) 118'
MF	11	(Brazil) Maicosuel		(substituted off) 76'
MF	10	(Brazil) Ronaldinho		(substituted off) 64'
FW	9	(Brazil) Diego Tardelli	(yellow card) 7'	(substituted off) 88'
FW	7	(Brazil) Jô
Substitutes:
GK	12	(Brazil) Giovanni
DF	14	(Brazil) Jemerson
DF	20	(Brazil) Alex Silva
FW	17	(Brazil) Guilherme		(substituted on) 76'
MF	25	(Brazil) Josué
FW	18	(Brazil) Luan		(substituted on) 64'
MF	23	(Argentina) Jesús Dátolo		(substituted on) 88'
Manager:
(Brazil) Levir Culpi

GK	1	(Argentina) Agustín Marchesín
DF	4	(Argentina) Carlos Araujo		(substituted off) 74'
DF	14	(Paraguay) Gustavo Gómez	(yellow card) 104'	(substituted off) 106'
DF	2	(Argentina) Diego Braghieri	(yellow card) 94'
DF	6	(Argentina) Maximiliano Velázquez (c)
MF	5	(Argentina) Diego González	(yellow card) 65'
MF	15	(Argentina) Leandro Somoza	(yellow card) 44'
MF	22	(Argentina) Jorge Ortiz		(substituted off) 105'
MF	16	(Paraguay) Víctor Ayala	(yellow card) 42'
FW	9	(Uruguay) Santiago Silva
FW	7	(Argentina) Lautaro Acosta	(yellow card) 64' (yellow-red card) 117'
Substitutes:
GK	12	(Argentina) Matías Ibáñez
DF	24	(Argentina) Matías Martínez
DF	3	(Uruguay) Alejandro Silva
MF	21	(Argentina) Nicolás Pasquini		(substituted on) 105'
MF	11	(Argentina) Jorge Valdez Chamorro
FW	18	(Argentina) Lucas Melano		(substituted on) 74'
FW	23	(Argentina) Oscar Benítez		(substituted on) 106'
Manager:
(Argentina) Guillermo Barros Schelotto

Assistant referees:
Miguel A. Nievas (Uruguay)
Nicolas Taran (Uruguay)
Fourth official:
Christian Ferreyra (Uruguay)
