= 2013 Copa Sudamericana elimination phase =

The elimination phase of the 2013 Copa Sudamericana was played from July 30 to September 5, 2013. A total of 46 teams competed in the elimination phase.

== Draw ==
The draw of the tournament was held on July 3, 2013, 12:00 UTC−3, at the Sheraton Hotel in Buenos Aires, Argentina.

Excluding the defending champion (entering in the round of 16), the other 46 teams were divided into four zones:

- South Zone: Teams from Bolivia, Chile, Paraguay, and Uruguay (entering in the first stage)
- North Zone: Teams from Colombia, Ecuador, Peru, and Venezuela (entering in the first stage)
- Argentina Zone: Teams from Argentina (entering in the second stage)
- Brazil Zone: Teams from Brazil (entering in the second stage)

The draw mechanism was as follows:

- South Zone and North Zone:
  - For the first stage, the 16 teams from the South Zone were drawn into eight ties, and the 16 teams from the North Zone were drawn into the other eight ties. Teams which qualified for berths 1 were drawn against teams which qualified for berths 4, and teams which qualified for berths 2 were drawn against teams which qualified for berths 3, with the former hosting the second leg in both cases. Teams from the same association could not be drawn into the same tie.
  - For the second stage, the 16 winners of the first stage were drawn into eight ties. The eight winners from the South Zone were drawn against the eight winners from the North Zone, with the former hosting the second leg in four ties, and the latter hosting the second leg in the other four ties.
- Argentina Zone: The six teams were drawn into three ties. Teams which qualified for berths 1–3 were drawn against teams which qualified for berths 4–6, with the former hosting the second leg.
- Brazil Zone: The eight teams were split into four ties. No draw was held, where the matchups were based on the berths which the teams qualified for: 1 vs. 8, 2 vs. 7, 3 vs. 6, 4 vs. 5, with the former hosting the second leg.

== Seeding ==
The following was the seeding of the 46 teams entered into the first stage and second stage draw:

Teams entering in the first stage		Teams entering in the second stage	
South Zone (16 teams)	North Zone (16 teams)	Argentina Zone (6 teams)	Brazil Zone (8 teams)
1. (Bolivia) Oriente Petrolero Universidad de Chile (Paraguay) Libertad (Uruguay) Peñarol; 2. (Bolivia) The Strongest (Chile) Colo-Colo (Paraguay) Cerro Porteño (Uruguay) River Plate; 3. (Bolivia) Blooming (Chile) Universidad Católica (Paraguay) Nacional (Uruguay) El Tanque Sisley; 4. (Bolivia) Real Potosí (Chile) Cobreloa (Paraguay) Guaraní (Uruguay) Montevideo Wanderers	1. (Colombia) Atlético Nacional (Ecuador) Barcelona (Peru) Juan Aurich (Venezuela) Deportivo Anzoátegui; 2. (Colombia) La Equidad (Ecuador) Emelec (Peru) Melgar (Venezuela) Deportivo Lara; 3. (Colombia) Deportivo Pasto (Ecuador) LDU Loja (Peru) Sport Huancayo (Venezuela) Trujillanos; 4. (Colombia) Itagüí (Ecuador) Independiente del Valle (Peru) Inti Gas (Venezuela) Mineros	1. (Argentina) Vélez Sarsfield; 2. (Argentina) Lanús; 3. (Argentina) River Plate; 4. (Argentina) Racing; 5. (Argentina) Belgrano; 6. (Argentina) San Lorenzo	1. (Brazil) Náutico; 2. (Brazil) Coritiba; 3. (Brazil) Ponte Preta; 4. (Brazil) Bahia; 5. (Brazil) Portuguesa; 6. (Brazil) Criciúma; 7. (Brazil) Vitória; 8. (Brazil) Sport Recife

== Format ==
In the elimination phase, each tie was played on a home-and-away two-legged basis. If tied on aggregate, the away goals rule was used. If still tied, the penalty shoot-out was used to determine the winner (no extra time is played). The 15 winners of the second stage (three from Argentina Zone, four from Brazil Zone, eight from ties between South Zone and North Zone) advanced to the round of 16 to join the defending champion (São Paulo).

== First stage ==
The first legs were played on July 30–August 1, and the second legs were played on August 6–8, 2013.

A minute of silence was held in honor to the passing of Ecuadorian player Christian Benítez at all first leg games of the first stage.

Team 1	Agg.	Team 2	1st leg	2nd leg
South Zone
Montevideo Wanderers (Uruguay)	1–2	(Paraguay) Libertad	1–2	0–0
Cobreloa (Chile)	2–0	(Uruguay) Peñarol	0–0	2–0
Real Potosí (Bolivia)	3–6	Universidad de Chile	3–1	0–5
Guaraní (Paraguay)	4–1	(Bolivia) Oriente Petrolero	0–0	4–1
El Tanque Sisley (Uruguay)	0–3	(Chile) Colo-Colo	0–1	0–2
Blooming (Bolivia)	0–5	(Uruguay) River Plate	0–1	0–4
Universidad Católica (Chile)	2–1	(Paraguay) Cerro Porteño	1–1	1–0
Nacional (Paraguay)	1–1 (a)	(Bolivia) The Strongest	0–0	1–1
North Zone
Inti Gas (Peru)	0–5	(Colombia) Atlético Nacional	0–1	0–4
Mineros (Venezuela)	4–2	(Ecuador) Barcelona	2–2	2–0
Independiente del Valle (Ecuador)	2–0	(Venezuela) Deportivo Anzoátegui	0–0	2–0
Itagüí (Colombia)	6–2	(Peru) Juan Aurich	3–0	3–2
Sport Huancayo (Peru)	1–7	(Ecuador) Emelec	1–3	0–4
Deportivo Pasto (Colombia)	3–2	(Peru) Melgar	3–0	0–2
Trujillanos (Venezuela)	0–1	(Colombia) La Equidad	0–1	0–0
LDU Loja (Ecuador)	3–1	(Venezuela) Deportivo Lara	2–0	1–1

=== Match G1 ===
August 1, 2013
18:15 UTC−3

Montevideo Wanderers (Uruguay)	1–2	(Paraguay) Libertad
F. Rodríguez 8'	Report	Montenegro 50'; M. Díaz 71' (o.g.)

Estadio Gran Parque Central, Montevideo
Attendance: 1,571
Referee: Patricio Loustau (Argentina)

August 8, 2013
21:45 UTC−4

Libertad (Paraguay)	0–0	(Uruguay) Montevideo Wanderers
	Report

Estadio Dr. Nicolás Léoz, Asunción
Attendance: 5,541
Referee: Sandro Ricci (Brazil)

Libertad won 2–1 on aggregate.

=== Match G2 ===
August 1, 2013
19:30 UTC−4

Cobreloa (Chile)	0–0	(Uruguay) Peñarol
	Report

Estadio Regional de Antofagasta, Antofagasta
Attendance: 6,421
Referee: Julio Quintana (Paraguay)

August 8, 2013
20:15 UTC−3

Peñarol (Uruguay)	0–2	(Chile) Cobreloa
	Report	Droguett 12'; Lezcano 21'

Estadio Centenario, Montevideo
Attendance: 30,452
Referee: Mauro Vigliano (Argentina)

Cobreloa won 2–0 on aggregate.

=== Match G3 ===
July 30, 2013
19:30 UTC−4

Real Potosí (Bolivia)	3–1	Universidad de Chile
Zerda 26'; Andrada 59'; Bubas 64'	Report	R. Rojas 10'

Estadio Víctor Agustín Ugarte, Potosí
Attendance: 9,099
Referee: Henry Gambetta (Peru)

August 6, 2013
19:15 UTC−4

Universidad de Chile	5–0	(Bolivia) Real Potosí
I. Díaz 32', 89' (pen.); Aránguiz 42' (pen.), 59'; Lorenzetti 90+1'	Report

Estadio Nacional Julio Martínez Prádanos, Santiago
Attendance: 25,664
Referee: Enrique Cáceres (Paraguay)

Universidad de Chile won 6–3 on aggregate.

=== Match G4 ===
August 1, 2013
21:50 UTC−4

Guaraní (Paraguay)	0–0	(Bolivia) Oriente Petrolero
	Report

Estadio Rogelio Livieres, Asunción
Attendance: 7,798
Referee: Mauro Vigliano (Argentina)

August 8, 2013
19:15 UTC−4

Oriente Petrolero (Bolivia)	1–4	(Paraguay) Guaraní
De Muner 54'	Report	Santander 35', 40'; D. A. González 76'; J. Benítez 90+4'

Estadio Ramón Tahuichi Aguilera, Santa Cruz
Attendance: 15,086
Referee: Roddy Zambrano (Ecuador)

Guaraní won 4–1 on aggregate.

=== Match G5 ===
July 31, 2013
20:30 UTC−3

El Tanque Sisley (Uruguay)	0–1	(Chile) Colo-Colo
	Report	Toledo 27'

Estadio Luis Franzini, Montevideo
Attendance: 3,002
Referee: Péricles Cortez (Brazil)

August 7, 2013
21:45 UTC−4

Colo-Colo (Chile)	2–0	(Uruguay) El Tanque Sisley
F. Benítez 13'; Toledo 16'	Report

Estadio Monumental David Arellano, Santiago
Attendance: 12,559
Referee: Raúl Orosco (Bolivia)

Colo Colo won 3–0 on aggregate.

=== Match G6 ===
July 31, 2013
19:30 UTC−4

Blooming (Bolivia)	0–1	(Uruguay) River Plate
	Report	Santos 58'

Estadio Ramón Tahuichi Aguilera, Santa Cruz
Attendance: 8,129
Referee: Ulises Mereles (Paraguay)

August 6, 2013
17:45 UTC−3

River Plate (Uruguay)	4–0	(Bolivia) Blooming
Taborda 39', 62'; Santos 52'; Techera 85'	Report

Estadio Luis Franzini, Montevideo
Attendance: 1,269
Referee: Pablo Díaz (Argentina)

River Plate won 5–0 on aggregate.

=== Match G7 ===
July 31, 2013
21:50 UTC−4

Universidad Católica (Chile)	1–1	(Paraguay) Cerro Porteño
Alvárez 71'	Report	Corujo 32'

Estadio San Carlos de Apoquindo, Santiago
Attendance: 8,251
Referee: Daniel Fedorczuk (Uruguay)

August 7, 2013
19:15 UTC−4

Cerro Porteño (Paraguay)	0–1	(Chile) Universidad Católica
	Report	Sosa 58'

Estadio General Pablo Rojas, Asunción
Attendance: 24,725
Referee: Saúl Laverni (Argentina)

Universidad Católica won 2–1 on aggregate.

=== Match G8 ===
July 30, 2013
19:30 UTC−4

Nacional (Paraguay)	0–0	(Bolivia) The Strongest
	Report

Estadio Defensores del Chaco, Asunción
Attendance: 3,314
Referee: Julio Bascuñán (Chile)

August 7, 2013
16:45 UTC−4

The Strongest (Bolivia)	1–1	(Paraguay) Nacional
Reynoso 50'	Report	Torales 10'

Estadio Hernando Siles, La Paz
Attendance: 15,121
Referee: Fernando Falce (Uruguay)

Tied 1–1 on aggregate, Nacional won on away goals.

=== Match G9 ===
July 30, 2013
13:30 UTC−5

Inti Gas (Peru)	0–1	(Colombia) Atlético Nacional
	Report	Cárdenas 56'

Estadio Ciudad de Cumaná, Ayacucho
Attendance: 9,305
Referee: Diego Lara (Ecuador)

August 6, 2013
20:45 UTC−5

Atlético Nacional (Colombia)	4–0	(Peru) Inti Gas
Valoy 19', 63'; Ángel 34'; Calle 83'	Report

Estadio Atanasio Girardot, Medellín
Attendance: 11,108
Referee: Juan Soto (Venezuela)

Atlético Nacional won 5–0 on aggregate.

=== Match G10 ===
August 1, 2013
19:00 UTC−4:30

Mineros (Venezuela)	2–2	(Ecuador) Barcelona
Chourio 22'; Jiménez 64' (pen.)	Report	M. Arroyo 43' (pen.); L. Caicedo 80'

Polideportivo Cachamay, Puerto Ordaz
Attendance: 15,304
Referee: Hernando Buitrago (Colombia)

August 8, 2013
20:45 UTC−5

Barcelona (Ecuador)	0–2	(Venezuela) Mineros
	Report	R. Blanco 21', 32'

Estadio Monumental Isidro Romero Carbo, Guayaquil
Attendance: 7,201
Referee: Julio Bascuñán (Chile)

Mineros won 4–2 on aggregate.

=== Match G11 ===
August 1, 2013
14:00 UTC−5

Independiente del Valle (Ecuador)	0–0	(Venezuela) Deportivo Anzoátegui
	Report

Estadio Rumiñahui, Sangolquí
Attendance: 3,189
Referee: Alejandro Mancilla (Bolivia)

August 8, 2013
18:45 UTC−4:30

Deportivo Anzoátegui (Venezuela)	0–2	(Ecuador) Independiente del Valle
	Report	Guerrero 20' (pen.), 66'

Estadio José Antonio Anzoátegui, Puerto la Cruz
Attendance: 3,026
Referee: Adrián Vélez (Colombia)

Independiente del Valle won 2–0 on aggregate.

=== Match G12 ===
July 30, 2013
15:45 UTC−5

Itagüí (Colombia)	3–0	(Peru) Juan Aurich
Cabrera 30'; Aguirre 39' (pen.), 45+3'	Report

Estadio Metropolitano Ciudad de Itagüí, Itagüí
Attendance: 1,512
Referee: Marlon Escalante (Venezuela)

August 7, 2013
15:45 UTC−5

Juan Aurich (Peru)	2–3	(Colombia) Itagüí
Ovelar 23'; Viza 79'	Report	García 3'; Restrepo 18'; Cortés 87'

Estadio Francisco Mendoza Pizarro, Olmos
Attendance: 5,758
Referee: Patricio Polic (Chile)

Itagüí won 6–2 on aggregate.

=== Match G13 ===
July 31, 2013
14:00 UTC−5

Sport Huancayo (Peru)	1–3	(Ecuador) Emelec
Farfán 48'	Report	Giménez 59'; Bolaños 61'; M. Caicedo 84'

Estadio Huancayo, Huancayo
Attendance: 10,208
Referee: Adrián Vélez (Colombia)

August 7, 2013
18:15 UTC−5

Emelec (Ecuador)	4–0	(Peru) Sport Huancayo
E. Valencia 43', 51', 71'; Mena 62'	Report

Estadio George Capwell, Guayaquil
Attendance: 8,085
Referee: Oscar Maldonado (Bolivia)

Emelec won 7–1 on aggregate.

=== Match G14 ===
July 31, 2013
20:50 UTC−5

Deportivo Pasto (Colombia)	3–0	(Peru) Melgar
Palacios 9', 26'; Murillo 23'	Report

Estadio Departamental Libertad, Pasto
Attendance: 8,111
Referee: Juan Soto (Venezuela)

August 6, 2013
15:15 UTC−5

Melgar (Peru)	2–0	(Colombia) Deportivo Pasto
Zúñiga 34', 44'	Report

Estadio Mariano Melgar, Arequipa
Attendance: 13,405
Referee: Omar Ponce (Ecuador)

Deportivo Pasto won 3–2 on aggregate.

=== Match G15 ===
July 30, 2013
21:20 UTC−4:30

Trujillanos (Venezuela)	0–1	(Colombia) La Equidad
	Report	Motta 46'

Estadio José Alberto Pérez, Valera
Attendance: 10,763
Referee: Roddy Zambrano (Ecuador)

August 7, 2013
20:45 UTC−5

La Equidad (Colombia)	0–0	(Venezuela) Trujillanos
	Report

Estadio Metropolitano de Techo, Bogotá
Attendance: 1,218
Referee: Víctor Carrillo (Peru)

La Equidad won 1–0 on aggregate.

=== Match G16 ===
July 30, 2013
13:30 UTC−5

LDU Loja (Ecuador)	2–0	(Venezuela) Deportivo Lara
Fábio Renato 30'; D. Arroyo 62'	Report

Estadio Federativo Reina del Cisne, Loja
Attendance: 5,129
Referee: Oscar Maldonado (Bolivia)

August 6, 2013
18:45 UTC−4:30

Deportivo Lara (Venezuela)	1–1	(Ecuador) LDU Loja
Torrealba 22'	Report	Barboza 90'

Estadio Metropolitano de Fútbol de Lara, Barquisimeto
Attendance: 6,402
Referee: Wilson Lamouroux (Colombia)

LDU Loja won 3–1 on aggregate.

== Second stage ==
The first legs were played on August 13–14 and 20–22, and the second legs were played on August 27–29 and September 5, 2013.

A minute of silence was held in honor to the passing of two-time World Cup-winning Brazilian player Gilmar at all second leg games of the second stage.

Team 1	Agg.	Team 2	1st leg	2nd leg
Universidad Católica (Chile)	7–2	(Ecuador) Emelec	4–0	3–2
San Lorenzo (Argentina)	0–1	(Argentina) River Plate	0–1	0–0
Deportivo Pasto (Colombia)	3–0	(Chile) Colo-Colo	1–0	2–0
Sport Recife (Brazil)	2–2 (3–1 p)	(Brazil) Náutico	2–0	0–2
Itagüí (Colombia)	1–0	(Uruguay) River Plate	1–0	0–0
Belgrano (Argentina)	1–2	(Argentina) Vélez Sarsfield	1–0	0–2
Universidad de Chile	4–2	(Ecuador) Independiente del Valle	1–1	3–1
Portuguesa (Brazil)	1–2	(Brazil) Bahia	1–2	0–0
Guaraní (Paraguay)	0–2	(Colombia) Atlético Nacional	0–2	0–0
Racing (Argentina)	1–4	(Argentina) Lanús	1–2	0–2
La Equidad (Colombia)	1–1 (a)	(Chile) Cobreloa	0–0	1–1
Vitória (Brazil)	1–1 (3–4 p)	(Brazil) Coritiba	1–0	0–1
Libertad (Paraguay)	4–1	(Venezuela) Mineros	2–0	2–1
Criciúma (Brazil)	1–2	(Brazil) Ponte Preta	1–2	0–0
LDU Loja (Ecuador)	1–0	(Paraguay) Nacional	0–0	1–0

=== Match O1 ===
August 20, 2013
19:15 UTC−4

Universidad Católica (Chile)	4–0	(Ecuador) Emelec
Meneses 28'; Alvárez 45+1'; Castillo 65'; Jadue 90+1'	Report

Estadio San Carlos de Apoquindo, Santiago
Attendance: 8,241
Referee: Patricio Loustau (Argentina)

August 27, 2013
17:30 UTC−5

Emelec (Ecuador)	2–3	(Chile) Universidad Católica
E. Valencia 65', 72'	Report	Castillo 42'; Cordero 62'; Jadue 74'

Estadio George Capwell, Guayaquil
Attendance: 15,624
Referee: Imer Machado (Colombia)

Universidad Católica won 7–2 on aggregate.

=== Match O2 ===
August 22, 2013
19:40 UTC−3

San Lorenzo (Argentina)	0−1	(Argentina) River Plate
	Report	Maidana 18'

Estadio Pedro Bidegain, Buenos Aires
Attendance: 28,127
Referee: Mauro Vigliano (Argentina)

September 5, 2013
21:15 UTC−3

River Plate (Argentina)	0−0	(Argentina) San Lorenzo
	Report

Estadio Monumental Antonio Vespucio Liberti, Buenos Aires
Attendance: 31,718
Referee: Néstor Pitana (Argentina)

River Plate won 1–0 on aggregate.

=== Match O3 ===
August 22, 2013
20:10 UTC−5

Deportivo Pasto (Colombia)	1–0	(Chile) Colo-Colo
Mina 18'	Report

Estadio Departamental Libertad, Pasto
Attendance: 5,278
Referee: Oscar Maldonado (Bolivia)

August 28, 2013
21:00 UTC−4

Colo-Colo (Chile)	0–2	(Colombia) Deportivo Pasto
	Report	Lalinde 17', 34'

Estadio Monumental David Arellano, Santiago
Attendance: 14,922
Referee: Silvio Trucco (Argentina)

Deportivo Pasto won 3–0 on aggregate.

=== Match O4 ===
August 20, 2013
19:30 UTC−3

Sport Recife (Brazil)	2–0	(Brazil) Náutico
Felipe Azevedo 5'; Patric 43'	Report

Estádio Ilha do Retiro, Recife
Attendance: 16,125
Referee: Sandro Ricci (Brazil)

August 28, 2013
21:50 UTC−3

Náutico (Brazil)	2–0	(Brazil) Sport Recife
Elicarlos 45+3'; Olivera 64'	Report
Penalties
Olivera (penalty missed); Tiago Real (penalty missed); Jonatas Belusso (penalty scored); Rogério (penalty missed)	1–3	(penalty scored) Felipe Azevedo; (penalty scored) Marcelo Cordeiro; (penalty scored) Patric

Arena Pernambuco, São Lourenço da Mata
Attendance: 8,320
Referee: Héber Lopes (Brazil)

Tied 2–2 on aggregate, Sport Recife won on penalties.

=== Match O5 ===
August 21, 2013
16:00 UTC−5

Itagüí (Colombia)	1–0	(Uruguay) River Plate
Cortés 63'	Report

Estadio Metropolitano Ciudad de Itagüí, Itagüí
Attendance: 2,156
Referee: Omar Ponce (Ecuador)

August 28, 2013
19:30 UTC−3

River Plate (Uruguay)	0–0	(Colombia) Itagüí
	Report

Estadio Luis Franzini, Montevideo
Attendance: 4,007
Referee: Ulises Mereles (Paraguay)

Itagüí won 1–0 on aggregate.

=== Match O6 ===
August 13, 2013
21:30 UTC−3

Belgrano (Argentina)	1–0	(Argentina) Vélez Sarsfield
Sabia 17' (o.g.)	Report

Estadio Julio César Villagra, Córdoba
Attendance: 17,556
Referee: Diego Ceballos (Argentina)

August 29, 2013
21:50 UTC−3

Vélez Sarsfield (Argentina)	2–0	(Argentina) Belgrano
Rescaldani 29'; Pratto 72' (pen.)	Report

Estadio José Amalfitani, Buenos Aires
Attendance: 21,338
Referee: Saúl Laverni (Argentina)

Vélez Sarsfield won 2–1 on aggregate.

=== Match O7 ===
August 21, 2013
21:30 UTC−4

Universidad de Chile	1–1	(Ecuador) Independiente del Valle
I. Díaz 43'	Report	H. León 62'

Estadio Nacional Julio Martínez Prádanos, Santiago
Attendance: 27,859
Referee: Julio Quintana (Paraguay)

August 29, 2013
15:00 UTC−5

Independiente del Valle (Ecuador)	1–3	Universidad de Chile
A. Solís 30'	Report	I. Díaz 27'; Aránguiz 70'; Civelli 86'

Estadio Rumiñahui, Sangolquí
Attendance: 5,781
Referee: Henry Gambetta (Peru)

Universidad de Chile won 4–2 on aggregate.

=== Match O8 ===
August 22, 2013
21:50 UTC−3

Portuguesa (Brazil)	1–2	(Brazil) Bahia
Carlos Alberto 61'	Report	Wallyson 41'; Obina 90+1'

Estádio do Canindé, São Paulo
Attendance: 1,178
Referee: Wilton Sampaio (Brazil)

August 28, 2013
21:50 UTC−3

Bahia (Brazil)	0–0	(Brazil) Portuguesa
	Report

Arena Fonte Nova, Salvador
Attendance: 5,941
Referee: Péricles Cortez (Brazil)

Bahia won 2–1 on aggregate.

=== Match O9 ===
August 20, 2013
19:15 UTC−4

Guaraní (Paraguay)	0–2	(Colombia) Atlético Nacional
	Report	Uribe 2'; J. Valencia 83'

Estadio Defensores del Chaco, Asunción
Attendance: 5,264
Referee: Julio Bascuñán (Chile)

August 27, 2013
20:00 UTC−5

Atlético Nacional (Colombia)	0–0	(Paraguay) Guaraní
	Report

Estadio Atanasio Girardot, Medellín
Attendance: 14,766
Referee: Marlon Escalante (Venezuela)

Atlético Nacional won 2–0 on aggregate.

=== Match O10 ===
August 14, 2013
21:15 UTC−3

Racing (Argentina)	1–2	(Argentina) Lanús
Viola 64'	Report	Melano 39'; Romero 45+1'

Estadio Presidente Juan Domingo Perón, Avellaneda
Attendance: 23,248
Referee: Germán Delfino (Argentina)

August 28, 2013
19:30 UTC−3

Lanús (Argentina)	2–0	(Argentina) Racing
Izquierdoz 34', 71'	Report

Estadio Ciudad de Lanús, Lanús
Attendance: 18,522
Referee: Patricio Loustau (Argentina)

Lanús won 4–1 on aggregate.

=== Match O11 ===
August 20, 2013
20:30 UTC−5

La Equidad (Colombia)	0–0	(Chile) Cobreloa
	Report

Estadio Metropolitano de Techo, Bogotá
Attendance: 1,261
Referee: José Argote (Venezuela)

August 29, 2013
18:30 UTC−4

Cobreloa (Chile)	1–1	(Colombia) La Equidad
Chávez 31' (pen.)	Report	Moreno 27'

Estadio Regional de Antofagasta, Antofagasta
Attendance: 6,119
Referee: Raúl Orosco (Bolivia)

Tied 1–1 on aggregate, La Equidad won on away goals.

=== Match O12 ===
August 21, 2013
21:50 UTC−3

Vitória (Brazil)	1–0	(Brazil) Coritiba
Fabrício 89'	Report

Estádio Manoel Barradas, Salvador
Attendance: 6,690
Referee: Ricardo Marques (Brazil)

August 27, 2013
21:50 UTC−3

Coritiba (Brazil)	1–0	(Brazil) Vitória
Júlio César 48'	Report
Penalties
Vítor Júnior (penalty scored); Bill (penalty scored); Arthur (penalty missed); Victor Ferraz (penalty missed); Júlio César (penalty scored); Gil (penalty scored)	4–3	(penalty scored) Fabrício; (penalty scored) Luís Alberto; (penalty missed) Biancucchi; (penalty missed) Pedro Oldoni; (penalty scored) Marquinhos; (penalty missed) Elizeu

Estádio Couto Pereira, Curitiba
Attendance: 8,891
Referee: Paulo Oliveira (Brazil)

Tied 1–1 on aggregate, Coritiba won on penalties.

=== Match O13 ===
August 21, 2013
19:15 UTC−4

Libertad (Paraguay)	2–0	(Venezuela) Mineros
Samudio 37'; Montenegro 45+1'	Report

Estadio Dr. Nicolás Léoz, Asunción
Attendance: 4,259
Referee: Daniel Fedorczuk (Uruguay)

August 28, 2013
20:30 UTC−4:30

Mineros (Venezuela)	1–2	(Paraguay) Libertad
R. Blanco 45'	Report	Montenegro 9'; Aquino 45+1'

Polideportivo Cachamay, Puerto Ordaz
Attendance: 14,702
Referee: Diego Lara (Ecuador)

Libertad won 4–1 on aggregate.

=== Match O14 ===
August 21, 2013
21:50 UTC−3

Criciúma (Brazil)	1–2	(Brazil) Ponte Preta
João Vitor 89'	Report	César 6'; Chiquinho 67'

Estádio Heriberto Hülse, Criciúma
Attendance: 6,806
Referee: Leandro Vuaden (Brazil)

August 27, 2013
19:30 UTC−3

Ponte Preta (Brazil)	0–0	(Brazil) Criciúma
	Report

Estádio Moisés Lucarelli, Campinas
Attendance: 3,422
Referee: Marcelo Henrique (Brazil)

Ponte Preta won 2–1 on aggregate.

=== Match O15 ===
August 22, 2013
17:40 UTC−5

LDU Loja (Ecuador)	0−0	(Paraguay) Nacional
	Report

Estadio Federativo Reina del Cisne, Loja
Attendance: 7,081
Referee: Adrián Vélez (Colombia)

August 29, 2013
18:30 UTC−4

Nacional (Paraguay)	0−1	(Ecuador) LDU Loja
	Report	Wila 28'

Estadio Defensores del Chaco, Asunción
Attendance: 3,126
Referee: Darío Ubriaco (Uruguay)

LDU Loja won 1–0 on aggregate.
