= 2013 Copa Sudamericana =

Copa Total Sudamericana 2013 Copa Total Sul-Americana 2013

Tournament details
- Dates: 30 July – 11 December 2013
- Teams: 47 (from 10 associations)

Final positions
- Champions: (Argentina) Lanús (1st title)
- Runners-up: (Brazil) Ponte Preta

Tournament statistics
- Matches played: 92
- Goals scored: 190 (2.07 per match)
- Attendance: 1,218,248 (13,242 per match)
- Top scorer(s): (Ecuador) Enner Valencia (5 goals)

The 2013 Copa Sudamericana (officially the 2013 Copa Total Sudamericana for sponsorship reasons) was the 12th edition of the Copa Sudamericana, South America's secondary international club football tournament organized by CONMEBOL. The winner qualified for the 2014 Copa Libertadores, the 2014 Recopa Sudamericana, and the 2014 Suruga Bank Championship. São Paulo were the defending champions, but lost to Ponte Preta in the semifinals.

Lanús became the fifth Argentine club to win the Copa Sudamericana, beating Brazilian club Ponte Preta in the finals to win their first title.

== Qualified teams ==
The following teams qualified for the tournament.

Association	Team (Berth)	Entry stage	Qualification method
(Argentina) Argentina; 6 berths	Vélez Sarsfield (Argentina 1)	Second stage	2012–13 Primera División super champion
(Argentina) Argentina; 6 berths	Lanús (Argentina 2)	Second stage	2012–13 Primera División aggregate table best team not qualified for superfinal or 2013 Copa Libertadores second stage
(Argentina) Argentina; 6 berths	River Plate (Argentina 3)	Second stage	2012–13 Primera División aggregate table 2nd best team not qualified for superfinal or 2013 Copa Libertadores second stage
(Argentina) Argentina; 6 berths	Racing (Argentina 4)	Second stage	2012–13 Primera División aggregate table 3rd best team not qualified for superfinal or 2013 Copa Libertadores second stage
(Argentina) Argentina; 6 berths	Belgrano (Argentina 5)	Second stage	2012–13 Primera División aggregate table 4th best team not qualified for superfinal or 2013 Copa Libertadores second stage
(Argentina) Argentina; 6 berths	San Lorenzo (Argentina 6)	Second stage	2012–13 Primera División aggregate table 5th best team not qualified for superfinal or 2013 Copa Libertadores second stage
(Bolivia) Bolivia; 4 berths	Oriente Petrolero (Bolivia 1)	First stage	Playoff loser between 2012 Clausura 3rd place and 2012 Apertura 3rd place
(Bolivia) Bolivia; 4 berths	The Strongest (Bolivia 2)	First stage	2012 Clausura champion and 2012 Apertura champion
(Bolivia) Bolivia; 4 berths	Blooming (Bolivia 3)	First stage	2012 Apertura 4th place
(Bolivia) Bolivia; 4 berths	Real Potosí (Bolivia 4)	First stage	2012 Apertura 5th place
(Brazil) Brazil; 8 + 1 berths	São Paulo (Title holders)	Round of 16	2012 Copa Sudamericana champion
(Brazil) Brazil; 8 + 1 berths	Náutico (Brazil 1)	Second stage	2012 Série A or 2012 Série B best team eliminated before 2013 Copa do Brasil round of 16
(Brazil) Brazil; 8 + 1 berths	Coritiba (Brazil 2)	Second stage	2012 Série A or 2012 Série B 2nd best team eliminated before 2013 Copa do Brasil round of 16
(Brazil) Brazil; 8 + 1 berths	Ponte Preta (Brazil 3)	Second stage	2012 Série A or 2012 Série B 3rd best team eliminated before 2013 Copa do Brasil round of 16
(Brazil) Brazil; 8 + 1 berths	Bahia (Brazil 4)	Second stage	2012 Série A or 2012 Série B 4th best team eliminated before 2013 Copa do Brasil round of 16
(Brazil) Brazil; 8 + 1 berths	Portuguesa (Brazil 5)	Second stage	2012 Série A or 2012 Série B 5th best team eliminated before 2013 Copa do Brasil round of 16
(Brazil) Brazil; 8 + 1 berths	Criciúma (Brazil 6)	Second stage	2012 Série A or 2012 Série B 6th best team eliminated before 2013 Copa do Brasil round of 16
(Brazil) Brazil; 8 + 1 berths	Vitória (Brazil 7)	Second stage	2012 Série A or 2012 Série B 7th best team eliminated before 2013 Copa do Brasil round of 16
(Brazil) Brazil; 8 + 1 berths	Sport Recife (Brazil 8)	Second stage	2012 Série A or 2012 Série B 8th best team eliminated before 2013 Copa do Brasil round of 16
(Chile) Chile; 4 berths	Universidad de Chile (Chile 1)	First stage	2012–13 Copa Chile champion
(Chile) Chile; 4 berths	Colo-Colo (Chile 2)	First stage	2012 Clausura classification phase 1st place
(Chile) Chile; 4 berths	Universidad Católica (Chile 3)	First stage	2013 Transición runner-up
(Chile) Chile; 4 berths	Cobreloa (Chile 4)	First stage	2013 Transición 3rd place
(Colombia) Colombia; 4 berths	Atlético Nacional (Colombia 1)	First stage	2012 Copa Colombia champion
(Colombia) Colombia; 4 berths	La Equidad (Colombia 2)	First stage	2012 Primera A aggregate table best team not qualified for 2013 Copa Libertadores
(Colombia) Colombia; 4 berths	Deportivo Pasto (Colombia 3)	First stage	2012 Primera A aggregate table 2nd best team not qualified for 2013 Copa Libertadores
(Colombia) Colombia; 4 berths	Itagüí (Colombia 4)	First stage	2012 Primera A aggregate table 3rd best team not qualified for 2013 Copa Libertadores
(Ecuador) Ecuador; 4 berths	Barcelona (Ecuador 1)	First stage	2012 Serie A champion
(Ecuador) Ecuador; 4 berths	Emelec (Ecuador 2)	First stage	2012 Serie A second-place playoffs winner
(Ecuador) Ecuador; 4 berths	LDU Loja (Ecuador 3)	First stage	2012 Serie A fourth-place playoffs winner
(Ecuador) Ecuador; 4 berths	Independiente del Valle (Ecuador 4)	First stage	2012 Serie A fourth-place playoffs loser
(Paraguay) Paraguay; 4 berths	Libertad (Paraguay 1)	First stage	2012 Primera División tournament champion with better record in aggregate table
(Paraguay) Paraguay; 4 berths	Cerro Porteño (Paraguay 2)	First stage	2012 Primera División tournament champion with worse record in aggregate table
(Paraguay) Paraguay; 4 berths	Nacional (Paraguay 3)	First stage	2012 Primera División aggregate table best team not qualified for 2013 Copa Libertadores
(Paraguay) Paraguay; 4 berths	Guaraní (Paraguay 4)	First stage	2012 Primera División aggregate table 2nd best team not qualified for 2013 Copa Libertadores
(Peru) Peru; 4 berths	Juan Aurich (Peru 1)	First stage	2012 Descentralizado aggregate table best team not qualified for 2013 Copa Libertadores
(Peru) Peru; 4 berths	Melgar (Peru 2)	First stage	2012 Descentralizado aggregate table 2nd best team not qualified for 2013 Copa Libertadores
(Peru) Peru; 4 berths	Sport Huancayo (Peru 3)	First stage	2012 Descentralizado aggregate table 3rd best team not qualified for 2013 Copa Libertadores
(Peru) Peru; 4 berths	Inti Gas (Peru 4)	First stage	2012 Descentralizado aggregate table 4th best team not qualified for 2013 Copa Libertadores
(Uruguay) Uruguay; 4 berths	Peñarol (Uruguay 1)	First stage	2012–13 Primera División champion
(Uruguay) Uruguay; 4 berths	River Plate (Uruguay 2)	First stage	2012–13 Primera División aggregate table best team not qualified for 2014 Copa Libertadores
(Uruguay) Uruguay; 4 berths	El Tanque Sisley (Uruguay 3)	First stage	2012–13 Primera División aggregate table 2nd best team not qualified for 2014 Copa Libertadores
(Uruguay) Uruguay; 4 berths	Montevideo Wanderers (Uruguay 4)	First stage	2012–13 Primera División aggregate table 3rd best team not qualified for 2014 Copa Libertadores
(Venezuela) Venezuela; 4 berths	Deportivo Anzoátegui (Venezuela 1)	First stage	2012 Copa Venezuela champion
(Venezuela) Venezuela; 4 berths	Deportivo Lara (Venezuela 2)	First stage	2012–13 Primera División aggregate table best team not qualified for 2014 Copa Libertadores
(Venezuela) Venezuela; 4 berths	Trujillanos (Venezuela 3)	First stage	2012–13 Primera División Serie Sudamericana winner with better record in aggregate table
(Venezuela) Venezuela; 4 berths	Mineros de Guayana (Venezuela 4)	First stage	2012–13 Primera División Serie Sudamericana winner with worse record in aggregate table

== Draw ==
The draw of the tournament was held on July 3, 2013 in Buenos Aires, Argentina.

Excluding the defending champion (entering in the round of 16), the other 46 teams were divided into four zones:

- South Zone: Teams from Bolivia, Chile, Paraguay, and Uruguay (entering in the first stage)
- North Zone: Teams from Colombia, Ecuador, Peru, and Venezuela (entering in the first stage)
- Argentina Zone: Teams from Argentina (entering in the second stage)
- Brazil Zone: Teams from Brazil (entering in the second stage)

The draw mechanism was as follows:

- South Zone and North Zone:
  - For the first stage, the 16 teams from the South Zone were drawn into eight ties, and the 16 teams from the North Zone were drawn into the other eight ties. Teams which qualified for berths 1 were drawn against teams which qualified for berths 4, and teams which qualified for berths 2 were drawn against teams which qualified for berths 3, with the former hosting the second leg in both cases. Teams from the same association could not be drawn into the same tie.
  - For the second stage, the 16 winners of the first stage were drawn into eight ties. The eight winners from the South Zone were drawn against the eight winners from the North Zone, with the former hosting the second leg in four ties, and the latter hosting the second leg in the other four ties.
- Argentina Zone: The six teams were drawn into three ties. Teams which qualified for berths 1–3 were drawn against teams which qualified for berths 4–6, with the former hosting the second leg.
- Brazil Zone: The eight teams were split into four ties. No draw was held, where the matchups were based on the berths which the teams qualified for: 1 vs. 8, 2 vs. 7, 3 vs. 6, 4 vs. 5, with the former hosting the second leg.

To determine the bracket starting from the round of 16, the defending champion and the 15 winners of the second stage were assigned a "seed" by draw. The defending champion and the winners from Argentina Zone and Brazil Zone were assigned even-numbered "seeds", and the winners from ties between South Zone and North Zone were assigned odd-numbered "seeds".

== Schedule ==
The schedule of the competition was as follows (all dates listed were Wednesdays, but matches may be played on Tuesdays and Thursdays as well).

Stage	First leg	Second leg
First stage	July 31	August 7
Second stage	August 14, 21	August 28; September 4
Round of 16	September 18, 25	September 25; October 2, 23
Quarterfinals	October 30	November 6
Semifinals	November 20	November 27
Finals	December 4	December 11

== Elimination phase ==
In the elimination phase, each tie was played on a home-and-away two-legged basis. If tied on aggregate, the away goals rule was used. If still tied, the penalty shoot-out was used to determine the winner (no extra time was played). The 15 winners of the second stage (three from Argentina Zone, four from Brazil Zone, eight from ties between South Zone and North Zone) advanced to the round of 16 to join the defending champion (São Paulo).

=== First stage ===
Team 1	Agg.	Team 2	1st leg	2nd leg
South Zone
Montevideo Wanderers (Uruguay)	1–2	(Paraguay) Libertad	1–2	0–0
Cobreloa (Chile)	2–0	(Uruguay) Peñarol	0–0	2–0
Real Potosí (Bolivia)	3–6	Universidad de Chile	3–1	0–5
Guaraní (Paraguay)	4–1	(Bolivia) Oriente Petrolero	0–0	4–1
El Tanque Sisley (Uruguay)	0–3	(Chile) Colo-Colo	0–1	0–2
Blooming (Bolivia)	0–5	(Uruguay) River Plate	0–1	0–4
Universidad Católica (Chile)	2–1	(Paraguay) Cerro Porteño	1–1	1–0
Nacional (Paraguay)	1–1 (a)	(Bolivia) The Strongest	0–0	1–1
North Zone
Inti Gas (Peru)	0–5	(Colombia) Atlético Nacional	0–1	0–4
Mineros de Guayana (Venezuela)	4–2	(Ecuador) Barcelona	2–2	2–0
Independiente del Valle (Ecuador)	2–0	(Venezuela) Deportivo Anzoátegui	0–0	2–0
Itagüí (Colombia)	6–2	(Peru) Juan Aurich	3–0	3–2
Sport Huancayo (Peru)	1–7	(Ecuador) Emelec	1–3	0–4
Deportivo Pasto (Colombia)	3–2	(Peru) Melgar	3–0	0–2
Trujillanos (Venezuela)	0–1	(Colombia) La Equidad	0–1	0–0
LDU Loja (Ecuador)	3–1	(Venezuela) Deportivo Lara	2–0	1–1

=== Second stage ===
Team 1	Agg.	Team 2	1st leg	2nd leg
Universidad Católica (Chile)	7–2	(Ecuador) Emelec	4–0	3–2
San Lorenzo (Argentina)	0–1	(Argentina) River Plate	0–1	0–0
Deportivo Pasto (Colombia)	3–0	(Chile) Colo-Colo	1–0	2–0
Sport Recife (Brazil)	2–2 (3–1 p)	(Brazil) Náutico	2–0	0–2
Itagüí (Colombia)	1–0	(Uruguay) River Plate	1–0	0–0
Belgrano (Argentina)	1–2	(Argentina) Vélez Sarsfield	1–0	0–2
Universidad de Chile	4–2	(Ecuador) Independiente del Valle	1–1	3–1
Portuguesa (Brazil)	1–2	(Brazil) Bahia	1–2	0–0
Guaraní (Paraguay)	0–2	(Colombia) Atlético Nacional	0–2	0–0
Racing (Argentina)	1–4	(Argentina) Lanús	1–2	0–2
La Equidad (Colombia)	1–1 (a)	(Chile) Cobreloa	0–0	1–1
Vitória (Brazil)	1–1 (3–4 p)	(Brazil) Coritiba	1–0	0–1
Libertad (Paraguay)	4–1	(Venezuela) Mineros de Guayana	2–0	2–1
Criciúma (Brazil)	1–2	(Brazil) Ponte Preta	1–2	0–0
LDU Loja (Ecuador)	1–0	(Paraguay) Nacional	0–0	1–0

== Final stages ==
In the final stages, the 16 teams played a single-elimination tournament, with the following rules:

- Each tie was played on a home-and-away two-legged basis, with the higher-seeded team hosting the second leg.
- In the round of 16, quarterfinals, and semifinals, if tied on aggregate, the away goals rule was used. If still tied, a penalty shoot-out was used to determine the winner (no extra time was played).
- In the finals, if tied on aggregate, the away goals rule was not used, and 30 minutes of extra time were played. If still tied after extra time, a penalty shoot-out was used to determine the winner.
- If there were two semifinalists from the same association, they had to play each other.

=== Bracket ===
Round of 16
16	(Brazil) São Paulo	1	4	5
1	(Chile) Universidad Católica	1	3	4
9	(Colombia) Atlético Nacional (p)	1	0	1 (4)
8	(Brazil) Bahia	0	1	1 (3)
14	(Brazil) Ponte Preta	2	0	2
3	(Colombia) Deportivo Pasto	0	1	1
11	(Colombia) La Equidad	1	1	2
6	(Argentina) Vélez Sarsfield	2	2	4
13	(Paraguay) Libertad	2	2	4
4	(Brazil) Sport Recife	0	1	1
12	(Brazil) Coritiba	0	1	1
5	(Colombia) Itagüí	1	2	3
10	(Argentina) Lanús	4	0	4
7	Universidad de Chile	0	1	1
15	(Ecuador) LDU Loja	2	0	2
2	(Argentina) River Plate	1	2	3

Quarterfinals
16	(Brazil) São Paulo	3	0	3
9	(Colombia) Atlético Nacional	2	0	2
14	(Brazil) Ponte Preta	0	2	2
6	(Argentina) Vélez Sarsfield	0	0	0
13	(Paraguay) Libertad	2	0	2
5	(Colombia) Itagüí	0	1	1
10	(Argentina) Lanús	0	3	3
2	(Argentina) River Plate	0	1	1

Semifinals
16	(Brazil) São Paulo	1	1	2
14	(Brazil) Ponte Preta	3	1	4
13	(Paraguay) Libertad	1	1	2
10	(Argentina) Lanús	2	2	4

Finals
14	(Brazil) Ponte Preta	1	0	1
10	(Argentina) Lanús	1	2	3

Note: The bracket was changed according to the rules of the tournament so that the two semifinalists from Brazil would play each other.

=== Round of 16 ===
Team 1	Agg.	Team 2	1st leg	2nd leg
São Paulo (Brazil)	5–4	(Chile) Universidad Católica	1–1	4–3
LDU Loja (Ecuador)	2–3	(Argentina) River Plate	2–1	0–2
Ponte Preta (Brazil)	2–1	(Colombia) Deportivo Pasto	2–0	0–1
Libertad (Paraguay)	4–1	(Brazil) Sport Recife	2–0	2–1
Coritiba (Brazil)	1–3	(Colombia) Itagüí	0–1	1–2
La Equidad (Colombia)	2–4	(Argentina) Vélez Sarsfield	1–2	1–2
Lanús (Argentina)	4–1	Universidad de Chile	4–0	0–1
Atlético Nacional (Colombia)	1–1 (4–3 p)	(Brazil) Bahia	1–0	0–1

=== Quarterfinals ===
Team 1	Agg.	Team 2	1st leg	2nd leg
São Paulo (Brazil)	3–2	(Colombia) Atlético Nacional	3–2	0–0
Lanús (Argentina)	3–1	(Argentina) River Plate	0–0	3–1
Ponte Preta (Brazil)	2–0	(Argentina) Vélez Sarsfield	0–0	2–0
Libertad (Paraguay)	2–1	(Colombia) Itagüí	2–0	0–1

=== Semifinals ===
Team 1	Agg.	Team 2	1st leg	2nd leg
São Paulo (Brazil)	2–4	(Brazil) Ponte Preta	1–3	1–1
Libertad (Paraguay)	2–4	(Argentina) Lanús	1–2	1–2

=== Finals ===
The finals were played on a home-and-away two-legged basis, with the higher-seeded team hosting the second leg. If tied on aggregate, the away goals rule was not used, and 30 minutes of extra time were played. If still tied after extra time, a penalty shoot-out was used to determine the winner.

December 4, 2013
21:50 UTC−2

Ponte Preta (Brazil)	1–1	(Argentina) Lanús
Fellipe Bastos 79'	Report	Goltz 58'

Estádio do Pacaembu, São Paulo
Attendance: 28,959
Referee: Roberto Silvera (Uruguay)

December 11, 2013
20:50 UTC−3

Lanús (Argentina)	2–0	(Brazil) Ponte Preta
Ayala 25'; I. Blanco 45+3'	Report

Estadio Ciudad de Lanús, Lanús
Attendance: 40,000
Referee: Enrique Osses (Chile)

Lanús won 3–1 on aggregate.

== Top goalscorers ==
Rank	Player	Team	Goals
1	(Ecuador) Enner Valencia	(Ecuador) Emelec	5
2	(Chile) Charles Aránguiz	Universidad de Chile	4
2	(Chile) Isaac Díaz	Universidad de Chile	4
4	(Venezuela) Richard José Blanco	(Venezuela) Mineros	3
4	(Chile) Nicolás Castillo	(Chile) Universidad Católica	3
4	(Argentina) Paolo Goltz	(Argentina) Lanús	3
4	(Paraguay) Jorge Daniel González	(Paraguay) Libertad	3
4	(Argentina) Lucas Melano	(Argentina) Lanús	3
4	(Paraguay) Brian Montenegro	(Paraguay) Libertad	3
4	(Uruguay) Santiago Silva	(Argentina) Lanús	3

== See also ==
- 2013 Copa Libertadores
- 2014 Recopa Sudamericana
- 2014 Suruga Bank Championship
