= 2012–13 Venezuelan Primera División season =

Copa Movilnet
- Season: 2012–13
- Champions: Zamora (1st title)
- Relegated: Monagas; Portuguesa
- 2014 Copa Libertadores: Zamora; Deportivo Anzoátegui; Caracas
- 2013 Copa Sudamericana: Deportivo Anzoátegui (cup winner); Deportivo Lara; Trujillanos; Mineros

The 2012–13 Primera División season was the 31st professional season of Venezuela's top-flight football league.

== Teams ==
Eighteen teams participated this season, sixteen of whom remain from the previous season. Carabobo and Tucanes were relegated after accumulating the fewest points in the 2011–12 season aggregate table. They will be replaced by Atlético Venezuela and Portuguesa, the 2011–12 Segunda División winner and runner-up, respectively.

Locations of the 2011–12 Primera División teams

Team	City	Stadium
Aragua	Maracay	Olímpico Hermanos Ghersi Páez
Atlético Venezuela	Caracas	Brígido Iriarte
Caracas	Caracas	Olímpico de la UCV
Deportivo Anzoátegui	Puerto La Cruz	José Antonio Anzoátegui
Deportivo Lara	Barquisimeto	Metropolitano de Barquisimeto
Deportivo Petare	Caracas	Olímpico de la UCV
Deportivo Táchira	San Cristóbal	Polideportivo de Pueblo Nuevo
El Vigía	El Vigía	Ramón "Gato" Hernández
Estudiantes	Mérida	Metropolitano de Mérida
Mineros	Ciudad Guayana	Polideportivo Cachamay
Llaneros	Guanare	Rafael Calles Pinto
Monagas	Maturín	Monumental de Maturín
Portuguesa	Acarigua	General José Antonio Paez
Real Esppor	Caracas	Brígido Iriarte
Trujillanos	Valera	Luis Loreto Lira
Yaracuyanos	San Felipe	Florentino Oropeza
Zamora	Barinas	Agustín Tovar
Zulia	Maracaibo	José "Pachencho" Romero

== Torneo Apertura ==
The Torneo Apertura was the first tournament of the season. It began in August 2012 and ended in December 2012.

=== Standings ===
Pos	Team	Pld	W	D	L	GF	GA	GD	Pts	Qualification
1	Deportivo Anzoátegui	17	12	3	2	31	18	+13	39	Serie Final and the 2014 Copa Libertadores Second Stage
2	Caracas	17	12	2	3	25	10	+15	38	
3	Deportivo Lara	17	9	4	4	24	17	+7	31	
4	Zamora	17	9	4	4	26	15	+11	31	
5	Mineros	17	9	2	6	22	23	−1	29	
6	Trujillanos	17	8	3	6	28	21	+7	27	
7	Llaneros	17	7	4	6	29	26	+3	25	
8	Deportivo Petare	17	7	3	7	24	23	+1	24	
9	Aragua	17	6	5	6	24	24	0	23	
10	Atlético Venezuela	17	5	6	6	21	19	+2	21	
11	Deportivo Táchira	17	6	3	8	25	26	−1	21	
12	Zulia	17	6	3	8	20	24	−4	21	
13	Portuguesa	17	6	3	8	17	21	−4	21	
14	El Vigía	17	5	3	9	18	25	−7	18	
15	Yaracuyanos	17	5	3	9	11	18	−7	18	
16	Real Esppor	17	5	2	10	19	28	−9	17	
17	Monagas	17	4	3	10	18	31	−13	15	
18	Estudiantes	17	0	8	9	11	24	−13	8	

=== Results ===
Home \ Away	ARA	ATV	AVE	CRC	DAN	DLA	DPE	DTA	EME	LLA	MGU	MON	POR	RES	TRU	YAR	ZAM	ZUL
Aragua				0–2			2–1		3–3	1–1			2–0	3–1		3–1	0–3	1–0
El Vigía	1–2				1–3	0–1	1–0	3–4			3–1				1–1	1–0		2–0
Atlético Venezuela	1–1	0–0			0–0	1–2	1–1				1–0	4–1			0–4			
Caracas		1–0	0–0						1–0	4–1	0–1	2–1	1–0	3–0			1–0	
Deportivo Anzoátegui	2–1			1–0			2–0	3–2	2–1				5–1	1–0		2–0		3–1
Deportivo Lara	0–0			1–2	1–2		3–2	0–0							1–0	1–0		3–2
Deportivo Petare	3–2			4–1				1–1	1–0				0–0	3–1		0–1		1–2
Deportivo Táchira			0–3	1–3					1–0	1–2		3–0	2–1	3–0			2–0	
Estudiantes		0–0	1–4			0–1				2–2	2–2	0–0			0–2		0–0	
Llaneros		2–1	1–3		2–0	3–3	1–3				4–0	2–3			3–0			
Mineros	1–1				0–2	2–1	1–3	2–1							2–0	1–0		3–1
Monagas	2–1	3–0			2–2	2–2	1–2				0–2				2–1	0–2		
Portuguesa		4–1	0–0			1–0			0–0	3–1	0–2	2–0			1–2		1–3	
Real Esppor		1–2	2–1			0–1			1–1	0–0	1–2	2–1	1–2				1–2	
Trujillanos	2–1			0–0	5–0		3–0	3–1						0–3		2–0		1–1
Yaracuyanos			2–1	0–2				0–0	1–0	1–0			0–1	2–3			0–0	1–1
Zamora		2–1	3–1		1–1	0–3	2–0			0–2	3–0	2–0			5–2			
Zulia			1–0	0–2				3–2	3–1	1–2		2–0	1–0	1–2			0–0	

Updated to match(es) played on 21 October 2012. Source: Soccerway
Legend: Blue = home team win; Yellow = draw; Red = away team win.

== Torneo Clausura ==
The Torneo Clausura was the second tournament of the season.

=== Standings ===
Pos	Team	Pld	W	D	L	GF	GA	GD	Pts	Qualification
1	Zamora	17	10	5	2	31	11	+20	35	Serie Final and the 2014 Copa Libertadores Second Stage
2	Deportivo Anzoátegui	17	10	4	3	21	14	+7	34	
3	Deportivo Lara	17	9	6	2	29	23	+6	33	
4	Trujillanos	17	8	6	3	19	10	+9	30	
5	Caracas	17	7	9	1	23	15	+8	30	
6	Mineros	17	7	6	4	26	17	+9	27	
7	Atlético Venezuela	17	7	5	5	19	19	0	26	
8	Estudiantes	17	6	5	6	21	20	+1	23	
9	Llaneros	17	5	8	4	13	14	−1	23	
10	Deportivo Táchira	17	5	7	5	20	16	+4	22	
11	Real Esppor	17	6	4	7	17	19	−2	22	
12	El Vigía	17	5	5	7	13	25	−12	20	
13	Yaracuyanos	17	5	3	9	20	21	−1	18	
14	Aragua	17	4	5	8	14	19	−5	17	
15	Zulia	17	2	9	6	17	18	−1	15	
16	Monagas	17	3	3	11	14	24	−10	12	
17	Deportivo Petare	17	2	6	9	7	24	−17	12	
18	Portuguesa	17	2	4	11	16	31	−15	10	

=== Results ===
Home \ Away	ARA	ATV	AVE	CRC	DAN	DLA	DPE	DTA	EME	LLA	MGU	MON	POR	RES	TRU	YAR	ZAM	ZUL
Aragua		0–0	1–1		0–1	2–3	2–0				3–1	1–2			1–2			
El Vigía			0–1	1–1					1–1	2–0		2–0	3–0	1–0			0–5	
Atlético Venezuela				0–0				2–0	1–0	1–1			3–3			2–1	0–2	2–0
Caracas	1–1					3–0	3–0	0–0							0–0	1–0		2–1
Deportivo Anzoátegui		1–1	1–0			1–1				2–0	3–2	2–1			1–0		1–0	
Deportivo Lara		2–1	3–0						2–2	0–0	1–0	3–2	4–2	3–2			0–3	
Deportivo Petare		0–1			0–2					0–0	0–2	0–0			1–1		1–1	
Deportivo Táchira	3–0	4–0			0–0		1–3				0–1				1–1	1–0		1–1
Estudiantes				4–1	1–1		5–1	1–0					1–1	0–0		1–0		1–0
Llaneros	0–0			0–0				1–1	3–1				1–0	2–0		1–0	0–1	
Mineros		4–0	2–0	1–1					3–1	2–2		0–0		1–1			1–0	
Monagas			0–2					1–2	1–0	0–1			0–1	0–1			2–3	2–1
Portuguesa	0–1			3–4	0–1		0–0	0–2						3–2		0–2		0–0
Real Esppor	1–0			1–1			1–0	1–0							1–3	0–2		0–0
Trujillanos		2–0	1–2			1–1			2–1	3–0	1–0	1–0	1–0					
Yaracuyanos	0–1				3–1	0–1	0–1				2–2	2–2			1–0			
Zamora	1–1			1–1					3–0				2–1	1–0		4–0		3–2
Zulia	2–0	0–0			1–2	1–1	4–0				0–0				0–0	3–3		

Updated to match(es) played on August, 2012. Source: Soccerway
Legend: Blue = home team win; Yellow = draw; Red = away team win.

== Aggregate table ==
Pos	Team	Pld	W	D	L	GF	GA	GD	Pts	Qualification or relegation
1	Deportivo Anzoátegui	34	22	7	5	52	32	+20	73	2014 Copa Libertadores Second Stage and 2013 Copa Sudamericana First Stage (Note: Deportivo Anzoátegui qualified for the 2013 Copa Sudamericana as the 2012 Copa Venezuela champion.)
2	Caracas	34	19	11	4	48	25	+23	68	2014 Copa Libertadores First Stage
3	Zamora	34	19	9	6	57	26	+31	66	2014 Copa Libertadores Second Stage
4	Deportivo Lara	34	18	10	6	53	40	+13	64	2013 Copa Sudamericana First Stage
5	Trujillanos	34	16	9	9	47	31	+16	57	Qualified to the Serie Sudamericana
6	Mineros	34	16	8	10	48	40	+8	56	Qualified to the Serie Sudamericana
7	Llaneros	34	12	12	10	42	40	+2	48	Qualified to the Serie Sudamericana
8	Atlético Venezuela	34	12	11	11	40	38	+2	47	Qualified to the Serie Sudamericana
9	Deportivo Táchira	34	11	10	13	45	42	+3	43	Qualified to the Serie Sudamericana
10	Aragua	34	10	10	14	38	43	−5	40	Qualified to the Serie Sudamericana
11	Real Esppor	34	11	6	17	36	47	−11	39	Qualified to the Serie Sudamericana
12	El Vigía	34	10	8	16	31	50	−19	38	Qualified to the Serie Sudamericana
13	Zulia	34	8	12	14	37	42	−5	36	
14	Yaracuyanos	34	10	6	18	31	39	−8	36	
15	Deportivo Petare	34	9	9	16	31	47	−16	36	
16	Estudiantes	34	6	13	15	32	44	−12	31	
17	Portuguesa	34	8	7	19	33	52	−19	31	Relegated to the Segunda División
18	Monagas	34	7	6	21	32	55	−23	27	Relegated to the Segunda División

Rules for classification: 1) points; 2) goal difference; 3) number of goals scored.

== Serie Final ==
Deportivo Anzoátegui and Zamora qualified to the Serie Final, which was contested on a home and away basis.

Pos	Team	Pld	W	D	L	GF	GA	GD	Pts
1	Zamora	2	1	1	0	4	3	+1	4
2	Deportivo Anzoátegui	2	0	1	1	3	4	−1	1

Rules for classification: 1st points; 2nd goals scored; 3rd away goals; 4th penalty shoot-out.

Primera División
2012–13 champion

1st title

== Serie Sudamericana ==
Other than the teams which already qualify for the Copa Libertadores (Apertura and Clausura champions and the best-placed team in the aggregate table) and the Copa Sudamericana (Copa Venezuela champion and the second best-placed team in the aggregate table), the eight best-placed teams in the aggregate table will contest in the Serie Sudamericana for the remaining two berths to the Copa Sudamericana, which qualify the two winners to the First Stage.

In the first round, the matchups are:

- Match A (1 vs. 8)
- Match B (2 vs. 7)
- Match C (3 vs. 6)
- Match D (4 vs. 5)

In the second round, the matchups are:

- Winner A vs. Winner C
- Winner B vs. Winner D

For the two second round winners, the team with the better record in the aggregate table will receive the Venezuela 3 berth, while the other team will receive the Venezuela 4 berth.

=== First round ===
==== Match A ====
Pos	Team	Pld	W	D	L	GF	GA	GD	Pts	Qualification
1	Trujillanos	2	0	2	0	2	2	0	2	Second round
2	El Vigía	2	0	2	0	2	2	0	2	

Rules for classification: 1st points; 2nd goals scored; 3rd away goals; 4th penalty shoot-out.

==== Match B ====
Pos	Team	Pld	W	D	L	GF	GA	GD	Pts	Qualification
1	Mineros	2	2	0	0	4	1	+3	6	Second round
2	Real Esppor	2	0	0	2	1	4	−3	0	

Rules for classification: 1st points; 2nd goals scored; 3rd away goals; 4th penalty shoot-out.

==== Match C ====
Pos	Team	Pld	W	D	L	GF	GA	GD	Pts	Qualification
1	Deportivo Táchira	2	1	1	0	3	2	+1	4	Second round
2	Atlético Venezuela	2	0	1	1	2	3	−1	1	

Rules for classification: 1st points; 2nd goals scored; 3rd away goals; 4th penalty shoot-out.

==== Match D ====
Pos	Team	Pld	W	D	L	GF	GA	GD	Pts	Qualification
1	Aragua	2	1	1	0	5	2	+3	4	Second round
2	Llaneros	2	0	1	1	2	5	−3	1	

Rules for classification: 1st points; 2nd goals scored; 3rd away goals; 4th penalty shoot-out.

=== Second round ===
==== Winner A vs. Winner C ====
Pos	Team	Pld	W	D	L	GF	GA	GD	Pts	Qualification
1	Trujillanos	2	0	2	0	1	1	0	2	2013 Copa Sudamericana First Stage
2	Deportivo Táchira	2	0	2	0	1	1	0	2	

Rules for classification: 1st points; 2nd goals scored; 3rd away goals; 4th penalty shoot-out.

==== Winner B vs. Winner D ====
Pos	Team	Pld	W	D	L	GF	GA	GD	Pts	Qualification
1	Mineros	2	1	1	0	3	2	+1	4	2013 Copa Sudamericana First Stage
2	Aragua	2	0	1	1	2	3	−1	1	

Rules for classification: 1st points; 2nd goals scored; 3rd away goals; 4th penalty shoot-out.
