= Emerson (footballer, born February 1986) =

Brazilian footballer

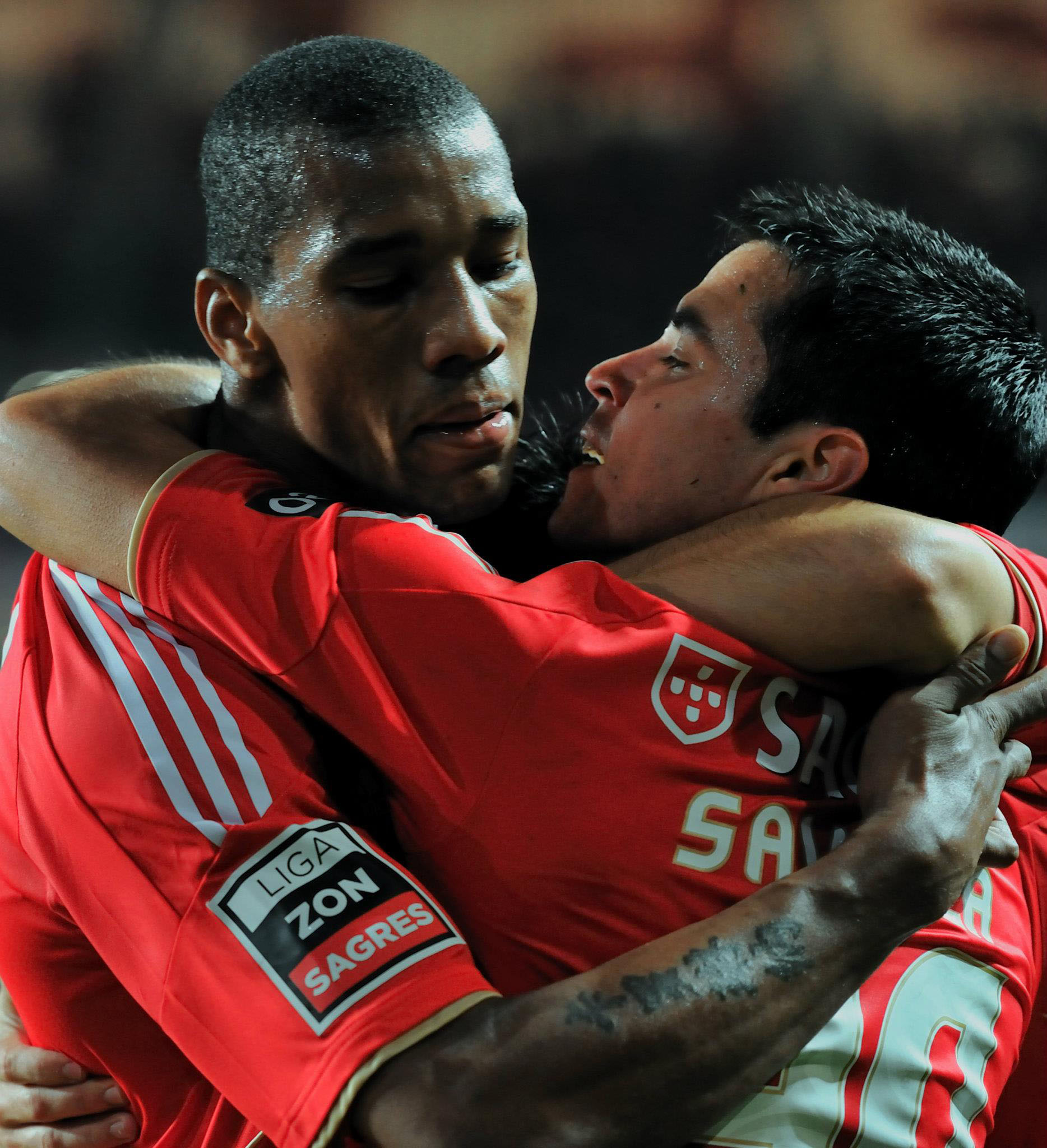
- Emerson (left) with Benfica in 2011

Personal information
- Full name: Emerson da Conceição
- Date of birth: 23 February 1986 (age 40)
- Place of birth: São Paulo, Brazil
- Height: 1.85 m (6 ft 1 in)
- Position: Left back

Youth career
- Corinthians-PR

Senior career*
Years	Team	Apps	(Gls)
2006	Corinthians-PR	10	(0)
2007–2011	Lille	84	(0)
2011–2012	Benfica	24	(0)
2012–2013	Trabzonspor	17	(2)
2013–2014	Rennes	11	(0)
2013–2014	Rennes B	3	(0)
2014–2015	Atlético Mineiro	17	(0)
2016–2017	Coritiba	1	(0)
2018	Rio Branco	3	(0)
2018–2019	Cianorte	0	(0)
- * Club domestic league appearances and goals

Emerson da Conceição (born 23 February 1986), known as Emerson, is a Brazilian former professional footballer who played as a left back.

== Club career ==
=== Lille ===
In January 2007, aged only 20, São Paulo-born Emerson left his country and moved to Lille OSC in France. He appeared in only two Ligue 1 games in his first season, his debut coming on 8 April in a 1–4 away loss against Olympique de Marseille.

Emerson became first-choice from the 2008–09 campaign onwards, and contributed with 20 league matches in 2010–11 as Les Dogues won their first national championship in 57 years. He also helped the team win the Coupe de France, but remained on the bench during the final against Paris Saint-Germain FC.

=== Benfica ===
In late July 2011, Emerson signed for Portuguese club S.L. Benfica, for an undisclosed fee. In his first and only season, he beat competition from World and European champion Joan Capdevila.

=== Trabzonspor ===
On 3 September 2012, Emerson joined Trabzonspor in Turkey for €1.6 million. One year later he signed for Stade Rennais F.C. in the French top flight, returning to his homeland in 2014 with Clube Atlético Mineiro.

== Club statistics ==
As of 9 January 2012

Club	Season	Domestic League		Domestic Cup		League Cup & Supercup		European Competition		Total	
Club	Season	App	Goals	App	Goals	App	Goals	App	Goals	App	Goals
Lille	2006–07	2	0	0	0	0	0	0	0	2	0
Lille	2007–08	8	0	0	0	0	0	0	0	8	0
Lille	2008–09	31	0	0	0	0	0	0	0	31	0
Lille	2009–10	22	0	0	0	0	0	9	0	31	0
Lille	2010–11	26	0	1	0	0	0	8	0	29	0
Lille	Total	87	0	1	0	0	0	17	0	108	0
Benfica	2011–12	21	0	1	0	1	0	9	0	24	0
Career totals		96	0	2	0	1	0	26	0	135*	0

== Honours ==
Lille

- Ligue 1: 2010–11
- Coupe de France: 2010–11

Benfica

- Taça da Liga: 2011–12

Atlético Mineiro

- Recopa Sudamericana: 2014
- Copa do Brasil: 2014
- Campeonato Mineiro: 2015
