= Paolo Goltz =

Argentine footballer

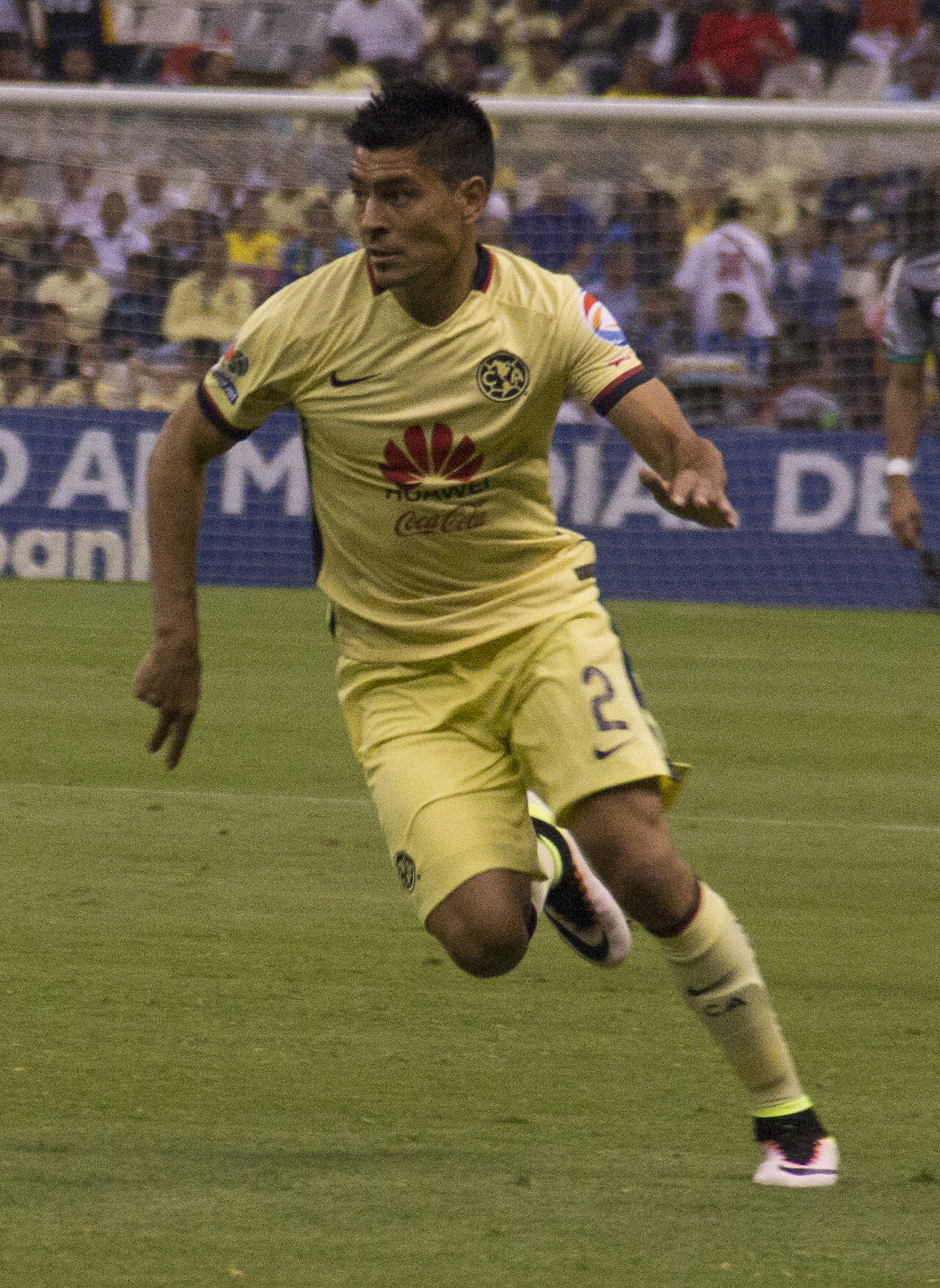
- Goltz in 2016

Personal information
- Full name: Paolo Duval Goltz
- Date of birth: 12 May 1985 (age 41)
- Place of birth: Hasenkamp, Argentina
- Height: 1.83 m (6 ft 0 in)
- Position: Centre-back

Senior career*
Years	Team	Apps	(Gls)
2002–2010	Huracán	105	(9)
2010–2014	Lanús	126	(7)
2014–2017	América	103	(4)
2017–2019	Boca Juniors	33	(0)
2020–2021	Gimnasia LP	16	(1)
2021–2025	Colón	137	(3)

International career^{‡}
2010	Argentina	1	(0)
- * Club domestic league appearances and goals as of 06:36, 7 December 2023 (UTC) ‡ National team caps and goals as of 5 May 2010

Paolo Duval Goltz (born 12 May 1985) is an Argentine professional footballer who plays as a centre-back for Argentine Primera División club Colón.

== Career ==
=== Huracan ===
He came to the club from Atlético Hasenkamp in 2001 and made the lower divisions in the entity of Parque de los Patricios. He made his debut in First on November 24, 2002, in the match between Huracán and Gimnasia and Esgrima La Plata that ended 0-0.1 Carlos Babington was the team's coach. But it continued with the arrival of Omar Labruna to the club in 2004. He won ownership when he returned to the First Division of the Globe in 2007 under the technical direction of Antonio Mohamed. They ratified it in the central defense Osvaldo Ardiles and later Claudio Ubeda. He was appointed captain of the team as of Apertura 2008, and was captain and benchmark of the team formed by Ángel Cappa called "Los Ángeles de Cappa" in Clausura 2009. From his debut to the end of Apertura 2009, he has recorded 166 games played with 30 goals.

=== Lanus ===
After eight years playing for Huracán, Goltz joined Lanús in July 2010 in a US$2 million deal. Goltz captained Lanús to their first Copa Sudamericana championship in 2013, scoring in the first leg of the final against Ponte Preta of Brazil.

In December 2013, he was awarded the 2013 South American Cup with Lanús, acting as captain and as one of its main figures; so much so that he was chosen as a defender of the Ideal Team of America that same year.

=== Club America ===
On 29 May 2014, Goltz signed with Mexican club América. On May 29, 2014, the transfer of Goltz to Club América was confirmed, where he signed for three seasons for a figure of around 1.2 million dollars.

On December 14, 2014, América was established as champion of the Apertura Tournament. 2014 of Liga MX. He was praised by many Club America for being a brave and tough defender for the team.

On 17 March 2015, while playing for Club América, Goltz was involved in a controversial incident during the first leg of the CONCACAF Champions League semifinals against Costa Rican side CS Herediano. In the first half of the match, following a foul by teammate Michael Arroyo on Herediano forward Cristhian Lagos, Goltz kicked a fallen Lagos directly in the head. While he escaped a red card during the match, the CONCACAF Disciplinary Committee reviewed the video evidence retroactively and handed Goltz a six-match suspension along with an undisclosed financial fine for violent conduct.

In his first season with the club, Goltz won the Apertura championship and the 2014–15 CONCACAF Champions League.

On 25 December 2016, during the second leg of the Apertura 2016 final against Tigres UANL, Goltz was involved in a highly controversial sending-off. In the 102nd minute of extra time, a massive on-field brawl erupted between both teams near the technical benches. Although television replays later showed that Goltz was primarily attempting to separate players and calm the altercation, referee Jorge Isaac Rojas showed him a direct red card for violent conduct. Visibly distraught and in tears, Goltz had to be restrained as he protested the decision before leaving the pitch. Club América ultimately finished the match with nine men and lost the championship 3–0 in a penalty shootout. Following the match, Club América filed an official appeal with the Mexican Football Federation's Disciplinary Committee. On 26 December 2016, the committee rescinded the red card, ruling that the ejection was completely erroneous and clearing him of any suspension for the start of the next tournament.

=== Boca Juniors ===
On July 6, 2017, Paolo Goltz signed his three-year contract with Boca Juniors of Argentina, thus being the first reinforcement of said club for the La Boca team. He quickly became the two starters of Boca Juniors and formalized an even defense with Magallán. In 2018, due to his poor performance and the hiring of Izquierdoz in the winter market, he began to lose ground in the first team, until, with the arrival of Lisandro López on loan in 2019, Goltz lost the title. On July 24, 2019, Paolo Goltz would return as a starter after a long inactivity, he would be firm and sure in Boca's 0–1 victory over Athletico Paranaense for the round of 16 of the Copa Libertadores 2019.

=== Gimnasia y Esgrima La Plata ===
In January 2020, Goltz left Boca Juniors after being personally recruited via phone calls by manager Diego Maradona to join Gimnasia y Esgrima La Plata. He signed an initial contract with the club and made his debut on 24 January 2020, instantly assuming a leadership role and being given the captain's armband for a 0–0 draw against Vélez Sarsfield. In June 2020, he agreed to a contract extension keeping him at the club through December 2022. He made a total of 16 appearances and scored one goal for Gimnasia, which came in a 1–1 draw against Patronato in February 2020. Following Maradona's passing and subsequent structural shifts at the club, Goltz negotiated his departure and transferred to Colón de Santa Fe in February 2021.

=== Colón de Santa Fe ===
Goltz transferred to Colón de Santa Fe in February 2021, where he quickly became a key figure in the defense. He played a central role in helping the club win its first-ever top-flight title, securing the 2021 Copa de la Liga Profesional with a 3–0 victory over Racing Club in the final. On 18 March 2023, during a Liga Profesional match against Independiente, Goltz was involved in a widely publicized, unusual incident that resulted in a penalty. In the 76th minute, Colón goalkeeper Ignacio Chicco placed the ball down and took a short goal kick to pass it to Goltz inside the penalty area. Unaware that the ball was already in play, Goltz picked up the ball with his hands to reposition it before passing. Following a VAR review, the referee awarded a penalty to Independiente for handball, which Matías Giménez converted to put Independiente ahead 2–1. The match ultimately finished in a 2–2 draw. Following Colón's relegation at the end of the 2023 season, Goltz chose to extend his contract to help the team fight for promotion in the Primera Nacional. After Colón was eliminated from the 2024 promotional play-offs, Goltz officially announced his retirement from professional football in December 2024 at the age of 39, concluding a 22-year playing career.

== Honours ==
Lanús

- Copa Sudamericana: 2013

América

- Liga MX: Apertura 2014
- CONCACAF Champions League: 2014–15, 2015–16

Boca Juniors

- Argentine Primera División: 2017–18
- Supercopa Argentina: 2018
