= Magal (footballer, born 1980) =

Brazilian footballer

Personal information
- Full name: Sidnei da Silva
- Date of birth: September 16, 1980 (age 46)
- Place of birth: Taquaritinga, Brazil
- Height: 1.70 m (5 ft 7 in)
- Position: Right back

Team information
- Current team: XV de Novembro

Youth career
- 2000–2002: Taquaritinga-SP

Senior career*
Years	Team	Apps	(Gls)
2003–2004	União São João		
2004	→ Sertãozinho (Loan)		
2004	Ponte Preta		
2005	Portuguesa Santista		
2005	Juventude		
2006	São Bento		
2006	América-RN		
2007–2010	Americana		
2007	→ Internacional (Loan)	18	(0)
2008	→ Figueirense (Loan)	23	(1)
2009	→ Vitória (Loan)	23	(0)
2010	→ Sertãozinho (Loan)	0	(0)
2011	Mirassol	0	(0)
2011	Fortaleza	2	(0)
2012	Red Bull Brasil	0	(0)
2012	Marília	6	(0)
2013	Mogi Mirim	0	(0)
2013	Ponte Preta	20	(0)
2014–2016	Mogi Mirim	51	(0)
2016–	XV de Novembro	0	(0)
- * Club domestic league appearances and goals as of 25 January 2016

Sidnei da Silva (born September 16, 1980, in Taquaritinga), or simply Magal, is a Brazilian right back. He currently plays for XV de Novembro.

== Contract ==
- Inter (Loan) 15 May 2007 to 31 December 2008
- Guaratinguetá 14 December 2006 to 31 December 2009
