= Rafael Farfán =

Peruvian footballer (born 1975)

Personal information
- Full name: Rafael Nicanor Farfán Quispe
- Date of birth: 28 December 1975 (age 50)
- Place of birth: Lima, Peru
- Height: 1.73 m (5 ft 8 in)
- Position: Defender

Youth career
- Defensor Lima

Senior career*
Years	Team	Apps	(Gls)
2002	Estudiantes de Med.		
2003	Villa del Mar		
2004	Estudiantes de Med.	42	(4)
2005	Univ. César Vallejo	41	(3)
2006	Sport Ancash	39	(1)
2007	Deportivo Municipal	20	(1)
2008	Bolognesi	42	(1)
2009	Alianza Atlético	42	(1)
2010-2013	Sport Huancayo	119	(11)
2014	UTC	38	(3)

International career
2012	Peru	2	(0)
- * Club domestic league appearances and goals

Rafael Nicanor Farfán Quispe (born 28 December 1975) is a Peruvian former professional footballer who played as a defender. He is the brother of Roberto Farfán and uncle of Jefferson Farfán.

== Club career ==
Farfán developed as a player in the Defensor Lima youth academy.

In 2002, he joined Estudiantes de Medicina. There he made his Torneo Descentralizado debut on 14 July 2002 playing as a forward in Estudiantes' 2–0 win over Alianza Atlético.

He joined Sport Huancayo in January 2010.

== International career ==
Farfán has made two appearances for the Peru national team. He received his first cap on 16 August 2012 at the age of 36. His debut was a friendly match away to Costa Rica and finished in a 1–0 win for Peru.
