= 2012 Copa Venezuela =

Tournament details
- Country: Venezuela
- Dates: 29 August – 28 November 2012
- Teams: 30

Final positions
- Champions: Deportivo Anzoátegui (2nd title)
- Runners-up: Estudiantes de Mérida

The 2012 Copa Venezuela was the 43rd staging of the Copa Venezuela. The winner qualified for the 2013 Copa Sudamericana.

== First round ==
- 1st legs played on 29 and 30 August 2012.
- 2nd legs played on 5, 11 and 12 September 2012.
- Byes:
  - Mineros de Guayana (2011 Copa Venezuela champion)
  - CD Lara (2011–12 Venezuelan Primera División champion)

Team 1	Agg.	Team 2	1st leg	2nd leg
Arroceros de Calabozo	1–9	Atlético Venezuela	1–3	0–6
Estrella Roja	3–3 (a)	Deportivo Anzoátegui	3–1	0–2
Deportivo Metropolitano	1–2	Real Esppor Club	0–1	1–1
Angostura FC	2–1	Monagas SC	2–0	0–1
UCV FC	1–5	Aragua FC	1–0	0–5
Tucanes de Amazonas	1–1 (3–4 p)	Deportivo Petare	1–0	0–1
Atlético Miranda	6–7	Caracas FC	4–2	2–5
Llaneros de Guanare	0–3	Zamora FC	0–2	0–1
Deportivo San Antonio	1–3	Deportivo Táchira	0–0	1–3
Lotería del Táchira	1–5	Atlético El Vigía	0–0	1–5
Guaraní SC	1–1 (4–2 p)	Portuguesa FC	1–0	0–1
Trujillanos FC	3–2	Zulia FC	2–2	1–0
Carabobo FC	2–3	Yaracuyanos FC	2–2	0–1
Ureña SC	0–0 (2–4 p)	Estudiantes de Mérida	0–0	0–0

== Second round ==
- 1st legs played on 26 September 2012.
- 2nd legs played on 3, 10 and 11 October 2012.

Team 1	Agg.	Team 2	1st leg	2nd leg
Mineros de Guayana	0–0 (3–4 p)	Caracas FC	0–0	0–0
Deportivo Petare	1–4	Atlético Venezuela	1–2	0–2
Aragua FC	4–4 (5–6 p)	Deportivo Anzoátegui	2–2	2–2
Angostura FC	1–9	Real Esppor Club	1–3	0–6
CD Lara	3–7	Estudiantes de Mérida	1–2	2–5
Yaracuyanos FC	2–4	Zamora FC	1–1	1–3
Trujillanos FC	1–1 (a)	Deportivo Táchira	0–0	1–1
Guaraní SC	2–2 (a)	Atlético El Vigía	0–1	2–1

== Quarterfinals ==
- 1st legs played on 17 October 2012.
- 2nd legs played on 24 and 25 October 2012.

Team 1	Agg.	Team 2	1st leg	2nd leg
Caracas FC	1–1 (2–3 p)	Real Esppor Club	0–1	1–0
Deportivo Anzoátegui	3–2	Atlético Venezuela	3–1	0–1
Guaraní SC	2–5	Estudiantes de Mérida	0–1	2–4
Trujillanos FC	2–4	Zamora FC	1–2	1–2

== Semifinals ==
- 1st legs played on 31 October 2012.
- 2nd legs played on 7 and 14 November 2012.

Team 1	Agg.	Team 2	1st leg	2nd leg
Real Esppor Club	1–3	Deportivo Anzoátegui	0–0	1–3
Zamora FC	2–4	Estudiantes de Mérida	2–3	0–1

== Final ==
- 1st leg played on 21 November 2012.
- 2nd leg played on 28 November 2012.

Team 1	Agg.	Team 2	1st leg	2nd leg
Deportivo Anzoátegui	2–1	Estudiantes de Mérida	1–1	1–0
