= Diego González (footballer, born 1988) =

Argentine footballer

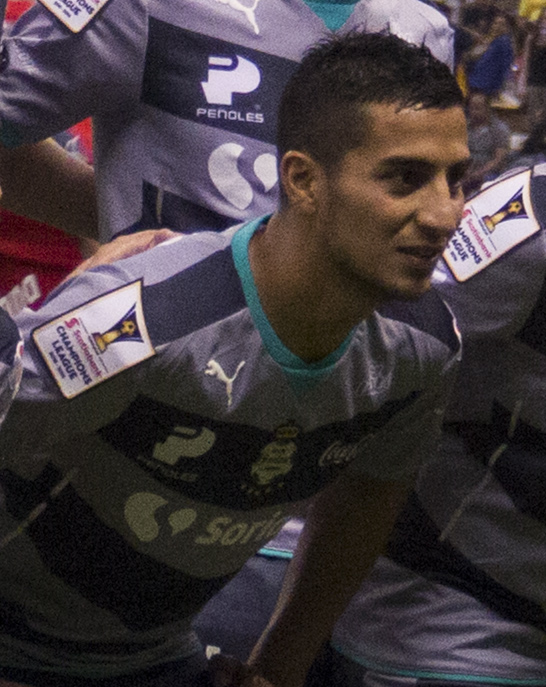
- González with Santos Laguna in 2016

Personal information
- Full name: Diego Hernán González
- Date of birth: 9 February 1988 (age 38)
- Place of birth: Buenos Aires, Argentina
- Height: 1.80 m (5 ft 11 in)
- Position: Defensive midfielder

Team information
- Current team: San Martín SJ
- Number: 49

Youth career
- Racing Club

Senior career*
Years	Team	Apps	(Gls)
2007–2014	Lanús	205	(14)
2010–2011	→ Rosario Central (loan)	12	(1)
2015–2016	Santos Laguna	67	(12)
2016–2020	Racing Club	65	(10)
2018–2019	→ Tijuana (loan)	34	(1)
2020–2024	Boca Juniors	44	(3)
2024–2025	Unión Española	31	(7)
2025–	San Martín SJ	18	(3)
- * Club domestic league appearances and goals as of 17:03, 23 November 2025 (UTC)

Diego Hernán González (born 9 February 1988), also known as "Pulpo" González, is an Argentine professional footballer who plays as a defensive midfielder, currently for San Martín SJ.

== Career ==
González made his first team debut for Lanús during the Apertura 2007 tournament, which the club went on to win.

In 2010, he joined Rosario Central, recently relegated to the second division. He returned to Lanús for the second half of the season.

On 4 December 2014, it was announced that he would sign a contract with Club Santos Laguna who plays in la Liga MX and would make his debut in the Torneo Clausura Mexico in 2015.

On 25 January 2024, he signed with Chilean Primera División side Unión Española.

On 13 March 2025, he returned to Argentina to join San Martín SJ, signing a contract until the end of 2025.

== Honours ==
=== National trophies ===
Honour	Team	Country	Year
Primera División	Lanús	Argentina	A-2007
Liga MX	Santos Laguna	Mexico	C-2015
Campeón de Campeones	Santos Laguna	Mexico	2014/15
Trofeo de Campeones	Racing Club	Argentina	2019
Copa de la Liga	Boca Juniors	Argentina	2020
Copa Argentina	Boca Juniors	Argentina	2019-20
Copa de la Liga	Boca Juniors	Argentina	2022
Primera División	Boca Juniors	Argentina	2022
Supercopa Argentina	Boca Juniors	Argentina	2022

=== International trophies ===
Honour	Team	Country	Year
Copa Sudamericana	Lanús	South America	2013
