= Mauricio Mina =

Equatoguinean footballer (born 1982)

Personal information
- Full name: Mauricio Mina Quintero
- Date of birth: 24 August 1982 (age 44)
- Place of birth: Caloto, Colombia
- Height: 1.82 m (6 ft 0 in)
- Position: Striker

Youth career
- Deportes Tolima

Senior career*
Years	Team	Apps	(Gls)
2006	Depor		
2006	Envigado	5	(0)
2007–2010	Depor		
2011–2014	Deportivo Pasto	130	(32)
2015	Águilas Doradas	14	(2)
2015	Boyacá Chicó	9	(1)
2016	Orsomarso	12	(2)

International career^{‡}
2014	Equatorial Guinea	1	(1)
- * Club domestic league appearances and goals as of 22 October 2016 ‡ National team caps and goals as of 22 October 2016

Mauricio Mina Quintero (born 24 August 1982) is a former professional footballer who last played as a striker for Orsomarso of the Categoría Primera B in Colombia. Born in Colombia, he played for the Equatorial Guinea national team.

== National team ==
Mina was going to represent Equatorial Guinea for the first time in May–June 2014. Like other Colombian players participating in this national team, Mina is of Black African descent, but has no tangible links with the country. He was renamed as Mauricio Ondo Mosquera.

He has scored twice in an unofficial friendly against Equatoguinean club Deportivo Ebenezer on 14 May 2014. His international debut was against Mauritania on 1 June 2014, scoring the first of three goals, for the 2015 Africa Cup of Nations qualifiers.

== Titles ==
- Deportivo Pasto 2011 (Categoría Primera B Championship)
