= Víctor Ayala =

Paraguayan footballer (born 1988)

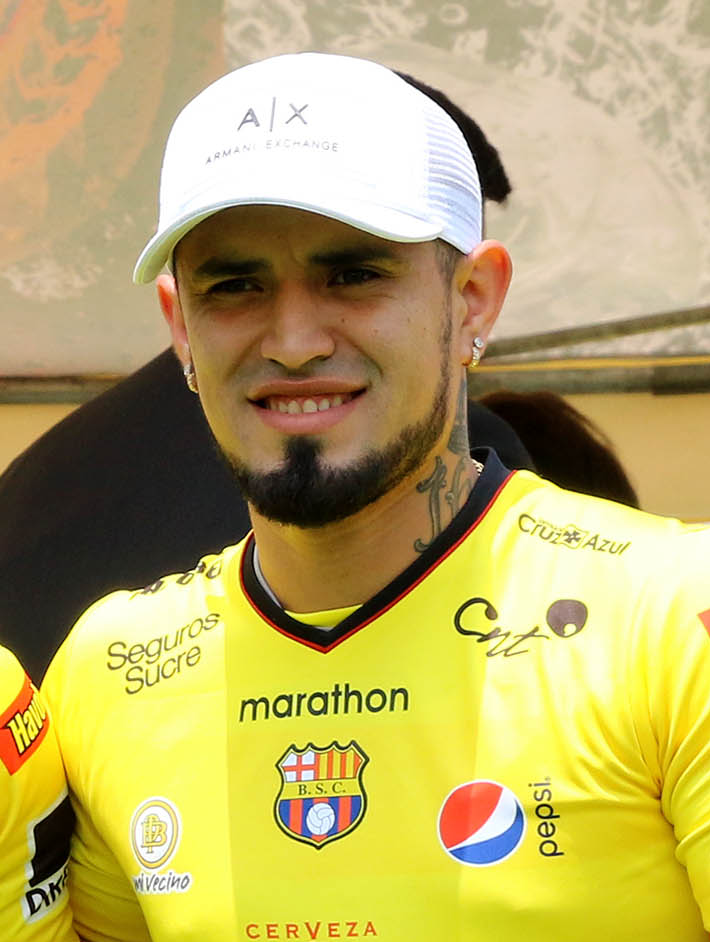
- Victor Ayala in 2018.

Personal information
- Full name: Víctor Hugo Ayala Núñez
- Date of birth: 1 January 1988 (age 38)
- Place of birth: Eusebio Ayala, Paraguay
- Height: 1.77 m (5 ft 10 in)
- Position: Midfielder

Team information
- Current team: Martín Ledesma

Youth career
- 1998–2005: Sport Colombia

Senior career*
Years	Team	Apps	(Gls)
2005–2006	Sport Colombia	11	(3)
2006–2007	Rubio Ñú	20	(7)
2007–2012	Libertad	151	(35)
2012–2016	Lanús	126	(18)
2016–2017	Al-Nassr	20	(6)
2018	Barcelona SC	7	(0)
2019–2021	Gimnasia LP	55	(4)
2021	Sol de América	18	(1)
2022	Sportivo Ameliano	17	(0)
2022	Guaireña	20	(2)
2023	Tacuary	19	(1)
2023	Recoleta	0	(0)
2024	San Lorenzo	0	(0)
2024	Itapuense	0	(0)
2025	Encarnación F.C.	19	(0)
2026–	Martín Ledesma	0	(0)

International career
2011–2017	Paraguay	18	(1)
- * Club domestic league appearances and goals as of 19:32, 10 April 2023 (UTC)

Víctor Hugo Ayala Núñez (born 1 January 1988) is a Paraguayan footballer who plays as a midfielder for Martín Ledesma. He is renowned for his long shot capabilities.

== International goals ==
As of match played 7 June 2016. Paraguay score listed first, score column indicates score after each Ayala goal.

International goals by date, venue, cap, opponent, score, result and competition
No.	Date	Venue	Cap	Opponent	Score	Result	Competition
1	7 June 2016	Rose Bowl, Pasadena, United States	18	Colombia	1–2	1–2	2016 Copa América

== Honours ==
=== Club Libertad ===
- Division Profesional: 2010 (Clausura)

=== Lanús ===
- Copa Sudamericana: 2013
- Primera División: 2016
