= Roberto Silvera =

Uruguayan football referee

Roberto Carlos Silvera Calcerrada
- Full name: Roberto Carlos Silvera Calcerrada
- Born: 30 January 1971 (age 55); Uruguay

Domestic
Years	League	Role

International
Years	League	Role
2003–2014	FIFA listed	Referee

Roberto Carlos Silvera Calcerrada (born 30 January 1971) is a Uruguayan football referee.

He has been an International FIFA referee since 2003 and officiated several important fixtures since then which include the semifinals of Copa Libertadores in 2007 between Boca Juniors and Cúcuta Deportivo (second leg) and again in 2008 between Boca Juniors and Fluminense (first leg).

Silvera also officiated the first leg of Copa Sudamericana final on two occasions (2006, Pachuca against Colo-Colo and 2009, LDU Quito against Fluminense).

He was selected for the 2007 FIFA U-20 World Cup in Canada but failed to pass a late fitness test and did not feature in the event. In 2011, he earned his first Copa América appointment after compatriot and controversial referee Jorge Larrionda was omitted from the selection.

During the 2011 Copa Libertadores group stage match between Santos and Colo-Colo he brandished a record 14 cards, five of them being red (three for Santos players and two for Colo-Colo).
