= Lucas Melano =

Argentine footballer (born 1993)

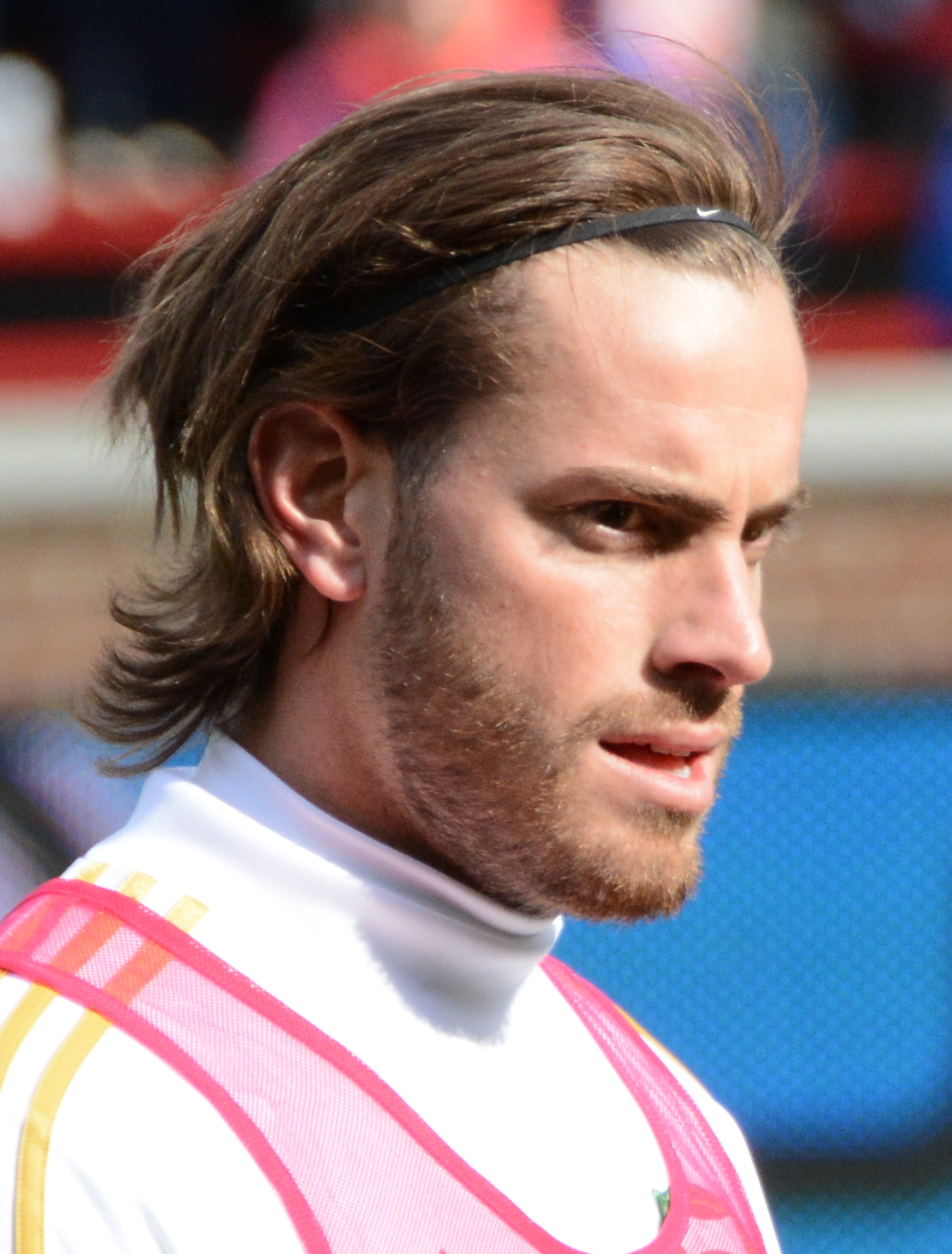
- Melano with Portland Timbers in 2019

Personal information
- Full name: Lucas Santiago Melano
- Date of birth: 1 March 1993 (age 33)
- Place of birth: Hernando, Argentina
- Height: 1.86 m (6 ft 1 in)
- Position: Forward

Youth career
- Belgrano

Senior career*
Years	Team	Apps	(Gls)
2011–2013	Belgrano	44	(7)
2013–2015	Lanús	42	(8)
2015–2019	Portland Timbers	69	(5)
2018	Portland Timbers 2	2	(0)
2017	→ Belgrano (loan)	15	(0)
2017–2018	→ Estudiantes (LP) (loan)	20	(3)
2019–2020	Atlético Tucumán	30	(3)
2021	San Lorenzo	7	(0)
2021	Central Córdoba	13	(3)
2022	Universidad Católica	5	(0)
2022–2023	Newell's Old Boys	0	(0)
2023	Sarmiento	25	(4)
2023–2024	Neftçi	12	(0)
2025	Miami FC	26	(2)

International career
2013	Argentina U20	3	(1)
- * Club domestic league appearances and goals as of 25 October 2025

Lucas Santiago Melano (born 1 March 1993) is an Argentine professional footballer who plays as a forward.

== Club career ==
=== Belgrano ===
Lucas made his debut for Belgrano on 17 March 2012, where he played 13 minutes as a substitute in a match against Independiente.

=== Lanús ===
On 23 July 2013, Melano transferred to Lanús from Belgrano. He made his debut on 4 August 2013. He was involved in Lanús' triumph in the 2013 Copa Sudamericana, scoring three goals in nine appearances during the competition. He also made two appearances in the 2014 Copa Libertadores tournament and had 19 appearances from 12 starts for Lanús during the 2013/14 regular-season.

=== Portland Timbers ===
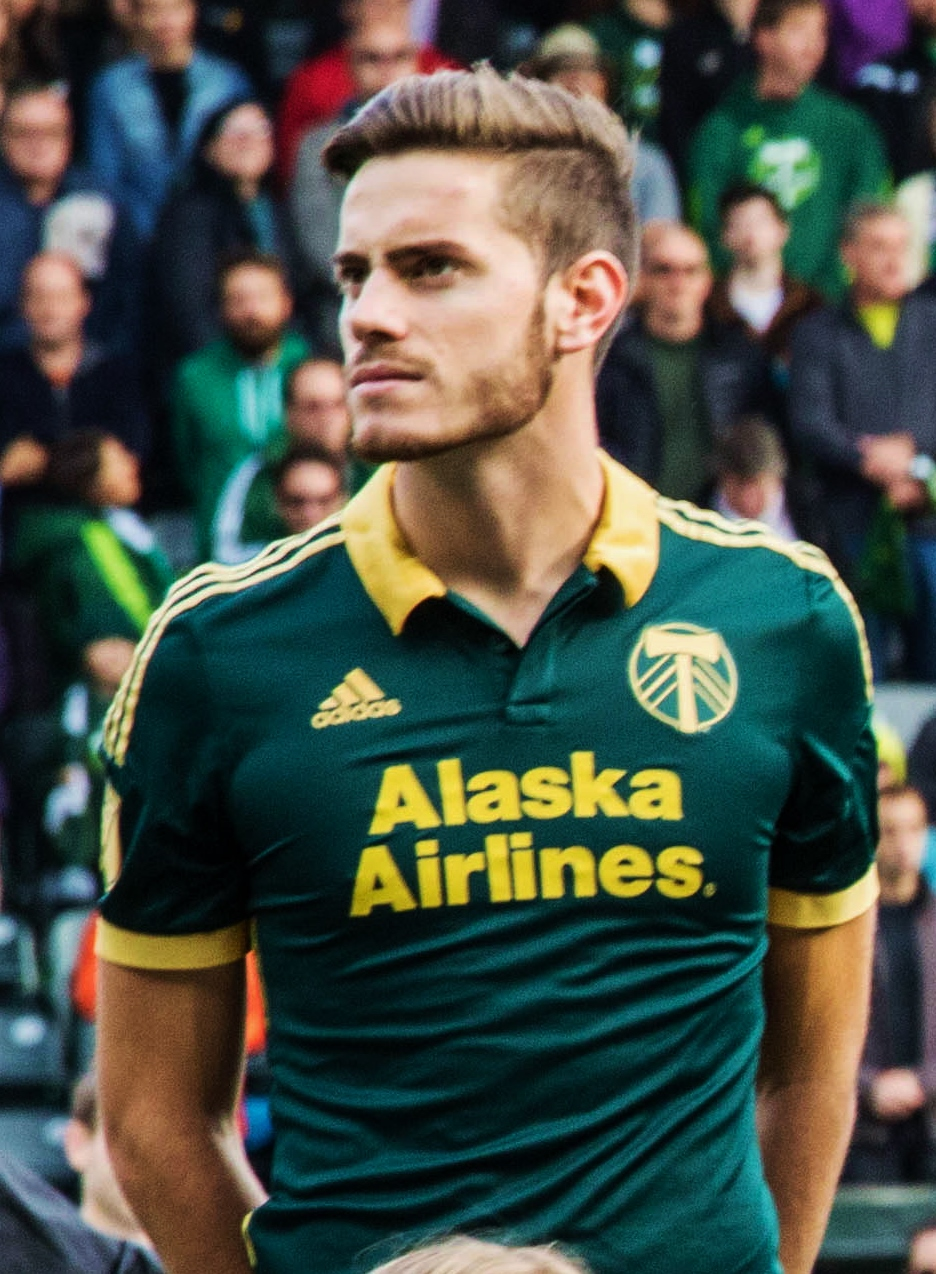
Melano playing for Portland Timbers in 2015

On 17 July 2015, the Portland Timbers signed Melano from Lanús. He made his Timbers debut, entering as a second-half substitute against FC Dallas on 25 July. In that game he drew a penalty kick late in the match.

On 6 December 2015, Melano and the Portland Timbers won MLS Cup defeating Columbus Crew 2–1 in Columbus, OH.

On 16 July 2019, Melano and Portland mutually agreed to terminate his contract.

=== Belgrano and Estudiantes (loan) ===
On 10 January 2017, Melano was loaned to his former club Belgrano until 31 December 2017.

For the 2017–18 season, he was loaned to Estudiantes, scoring in his first official league appearance on Aug 28, 2017. He returned to Portland Timbers on August 9, 2018.

=== Atlético Tucumán ===
On 27 July 2019, Melano signed for Atlético Tucumán.

=== San Lorenzo ===
On 11 February 2021, Melano joined San Lorenzo.

=== Universidad Católica ===
In 2022, he joined Chilean side Universidad Católica, but in July of the same year, the club and Melano ended the contract by common agreement.

=== Newell's Old Boys ===
On 31 August 2022 it was confirmed, that Melano had joined Newell's Old Boys on a one-year deal.

=== Neftçi ===
In 2023, Melano signed a 2-year contract with Neftçi. He participated in a total of 12 official matches for the club. On August 29, 2024, Neftçi mutually terminated its contract with Melano, and he obtained free agent status.

=== Miami FC ===
On 5 February 2025, Miami FC announced the signing of Melano.

== Career statistics ==
=== Club ===
As of 24 April 2022

Club	Season	League			National Cup		Continental		Other		Total	
Club	Season	Division	Apps	Goals	Apps	Goals	Apps	Goals	Apps	Goals	Apps	Goals
Belgrano	2011-12	Argentine Primera División	7	2	1	0	—		—		8	2
Belgrano	2012-13	Argentine Primera División	37	5	1	0	—		—		38	5
Belgrano	Total		44	7	2	0	0	0	0	0	46	7
Lanús	2013-14	Argentine Primera División	19	3	—		11 (Note: 2 appearances in Copa Libertadores, 9 in Copa Sudamericana)	3	—		30	6
Lanús	2014-15	Argentine Primera División	9	0	1	0	5 (Note: 2 appearances in Copa Sudamericana, 2 in Recopa Sudamericana, 1 in J.League Cup)	0	—		15	0
Lanús	2015-16	Argentine Primera División	14	5	—		—		—		14	5
Lanús	Total		42	8	1	0	16	3	0	0	59	11
Portland Timbers	2015	Major League Soccer	19	2	—		—		—		19	2
Portland Timbers	2016	Major League Soccer	31	3	1	0	3 (Note: Appearance(s) in the CONCACAF Champions League)	0	—		35	3
Portland Timbers	2018	Major League Soccer	11	1	—		—		—		11	1
Portland Timbers	2019	Major League Soccer	8	0	—		—		—		8	0
Portland Timbers	Total		69	6	1	0	3	0	0	0	73	6
Portland Timbers 2	2018	MLS Next Pro	2	0	—		—		—		2	0
Belgrano (loan)	2016-17	Argentine Primera División	15	0	1	0	—		—		16	0
Estudiantes (loan)	2017-18	Argentine Primera División	20	3	—		8 (Note: 6 appearances in Copa Libertadores, 2 in Copa Sudamericana)	2	—		28	5
Atlético Tucumán	2019-20	Argentine Primera División	19	0	2	0	4 (Note: Appearance(s) in the Copa Libertadores)	0	—		25	0
Atlético Tucumán	2020	Argentine Primera División	11	3	—		2 (Note: Appearance(s) in the Copa Sudamericana)	0	—		13	3
Atlético Tucumán	Total		30	3	2	0	6	0	0	0	38	3
San Lorenzo	2020	Argentine Primera División	7	0	2	0	6 (Note: 3 appearances in Copa Libertadores, 3 in Copa Sudamericana)	0	—		15	0
Central Córdoba	2021	Argentine Primera División	13	3	—		—		—		13	3
Universidad Católica	2022	Chilean Primera División	3	0	0	0	1	0	—		4	0
Total en su carrera			245	30	9	0	40	5	0	0	294	35

== Honours ==
=== Club ===
C.A. Lanús

- Copa Sudamericana: 2013

Portland Timbers

- MLS Cup: 2015
- Western Conference (Playoffs): 2015
