= Estadio Ciudad de Lanús – Néstor Díaz Pérez =

Football stadium in Lanús, Argentina

Coordinates: 34°43′04″S 58°23′02″W

City of Lanús Stadium
- Estadio Ciudad de Lanús
- La Fortaleza
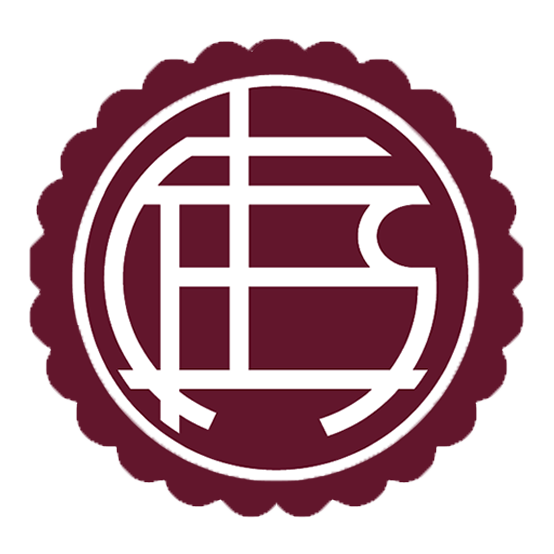

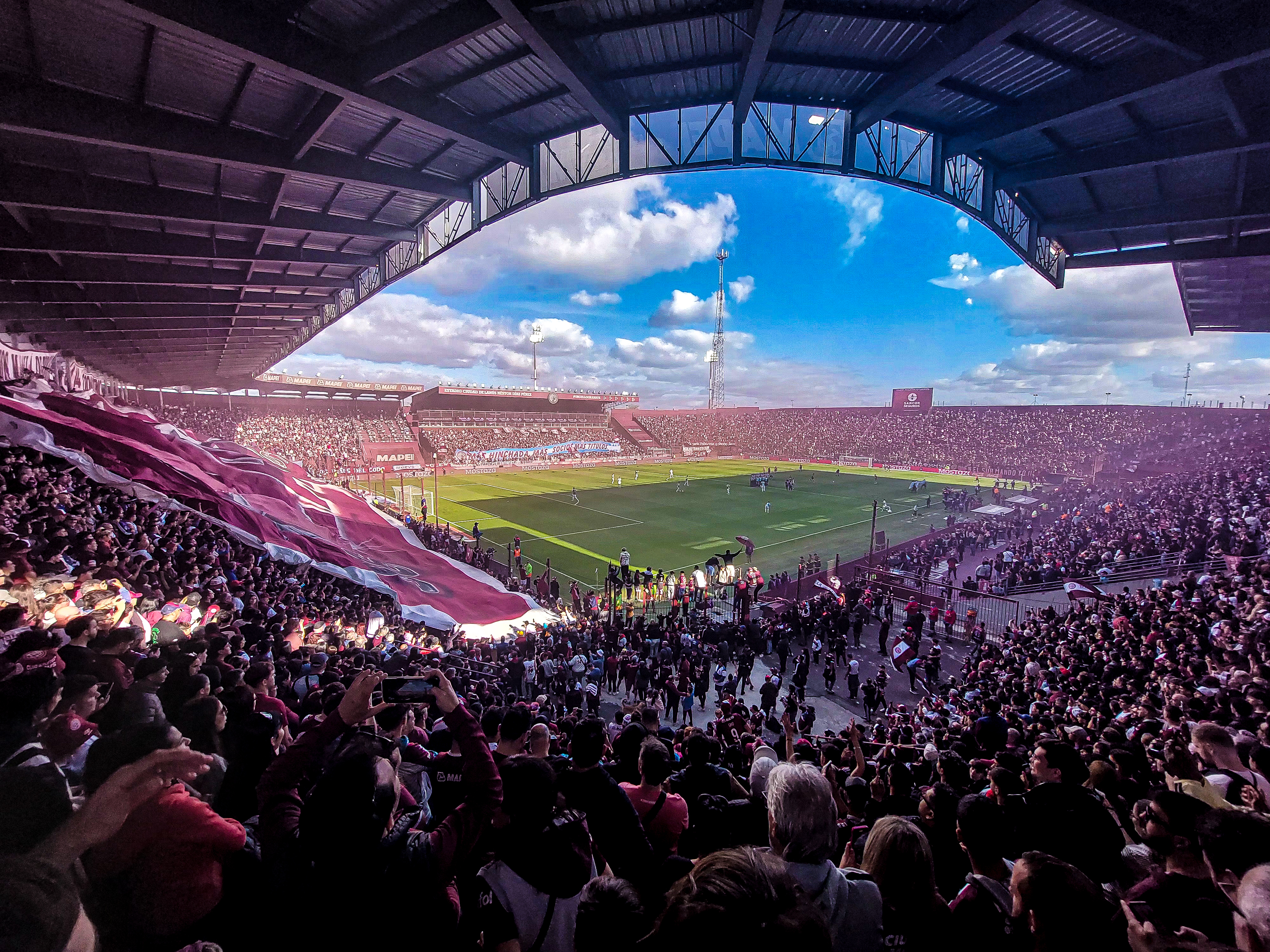
- The stadium during a Clásico del Sur in 2025
- Interactive map of City of Lanús Stadium
- Full name: Estadio Ciudad de Lanús Néstor Díaz Pérez
- Former names: Estadio Ciudad de Lanús (1929–2005)
- Address: Ramón Cabrero 2007; Lanús; Argentina
- Owner: C.A. Lanús
- Capacity: 45,319
- Surface: Grass
- Field size: 105 x 70 m

Construction
- Opened: February 24, 1929; 97 years ago
- Expanded: 1930, 2003

Tenant
- C.A. Lanús (1929–present)

Website
- clublanus.com/estadio

The City of Lanús – Néstor Díaz Pérez Stadium (Spanish: Estadio Ciudad de Lanús - Néstor Díaz Pérez, Spanish pronunciation: [estˈaðjo θjuðˈad dˈe lanˈus nˈestoɾ dˈiaθ pˈeɾeθ]) is an association football stadium in Lanús, Argentina. Located in Lanús Este district, it is the home of Lanús.

Built in 1929, the stadium holds 45,319 people. It is named after Néstor Díaz Pérez, former president of the club under whose mandate the stadium was built. Popularly, it is known as La Fortaleza (The Fortress).

== History ==
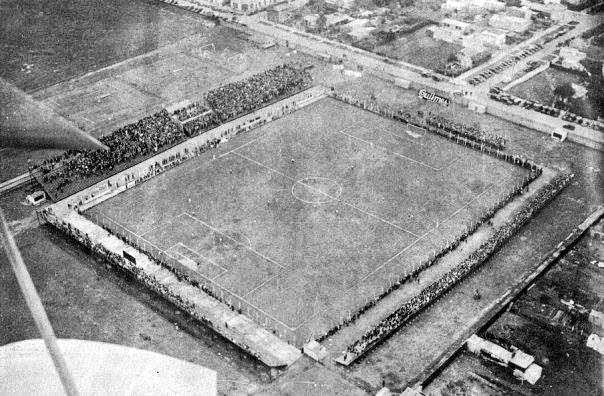
Aerial view of the stadium in 1938

Club Lanús' first stadium was located on Wield and Deheza streets, north side from the Buenos Aires Great Southern Railway tracks. The team was promoted to Primera División in 1919, debuting in 1920 v Sportivo Almagro in the old venue. In 1929, the club built a new stadium on Inocencio Arias (nowadays, Héctor Guidi) and General Acha streets, 650 mts from the former venue.

The stadium was inaugurated on February 24, 1929. One year after, the club expanded the capacity of the venue, building new grandstands, to 30,000 spectators.

In early 1960s the club built the first concrete grandstand at the stadium, with a sector for the press, while the rest of the venue still was made of wood. In 1993, Lanús started works to refurbish the stadium with the purpose of replacing all the wood grandstands by concrete structures and other improvements, nevertheless works were delayed and they were not completed until 2003.

Lanús stadium hosted its first international club matches in the 2008 Copa Libertadores, where Lanús debuted, defeating the Uruguayan side Danubio 3–1. Lanús' international games at its own stadium also included matches of Copa Sudamericana.

In September 2010, the club started construction on a roof for the local stand, which has since been completed. Several other works were completed in 2014, these additions consisting in a new changing rooms, a press conference room, an official club shop, a highly competitive gym, a café for club members and a secondary school behind the stadium.
