= 2019–20 Club Atlético Lanús season =

Lanús
2019–20 season
- President: Nicolás Russo
- Manager: Luis Zubeldía
- Stadium: Estadio Ciudad de Lanús – Néstor Díaz Pérez
- Top goalscorer: League: Carlos Auzqui (2); All: Carlos Auzqui (2)

The 2019–20 season is Lanús' 29th consecutive season in the top division of Argentine football. In addition to the Primera División, the club are competing in the Copa Argentina, Copa de la Superliga and Copa Sudamericana.

The season generally covers the period from 1 July 2019 to 30 June 2020.

== Review ==
=== Pre-season ===
Young right winger Matías Vera was Lanús' first departure, as he agreed to be loaned to Barracas Central on 7 June 2019; Leandro Maciel also left on loan, joining Aldosivi five days later. Barracas Central signed another player from Lanús, with forward Rodrigo Pacheco agreeing permanent terms with the newly-promoted Primera B Nacional team on 11 June. On the same day, the club announced their first incoming - Ezequiel Muñoz from La Liga's Leganés. Agustín Rossi joined the club on loan from Boca Juniors on 12 June. A third transaction with Barracas Central was confirmed on 21 June, with Marcos Pinto agreeing to join them on loan from 3 July. Further players departed Lanús on loan on 22 June, as Marcos Astina and Leonardo Flores penned contracts with Atlanta.

Luciano Abecasis completed a move from Godoy Cruz on 26 June. Matías Ibáñez was loaned to Patronato on 29 June. Numerous loans from the previous campaign officially expired on and around 30 June. They were due to meet 3 de Febrero in a pre-season friendly on that same day, but the match was cancelled a day prior. Atlético de Rafaela snapped up Júnior Mendieta and Alan Bonansea from Lanús on 3 July. Barracas Central formalised a fourth signing from the club, a third on loan, on 4 July as Enzo Ortiz headed off across Buenos Aires. Gabriel Ramírez moved to Quilmes on 5 July. Lanús and Atlético Nacional played out a goalless exhibition draw on 6 July, in front of 18,122 fans. Sergio González went to Independiente Rivadavia on 8 July.

José Sand and Pablo Martínez scored goals in separate friendlies with Gimnasia y Esgrima on 10 July as the club secured back-to-back wins. Fernando Barrientos was loaned to Guaraní on 10 July, as Sebastián Ribas also left on loan on 11 July to Rosario Central. Nicolás Orsini was transferred to Lanús from Sarmiento on 12 July. Patronato got the better of Lanús across two exhibition matches on 13 July. On 14 July, Facundo Monteseirin switched Lanús for San Martín. A second loan incoming came on 17 July in River Plate's Carlos Auzqui. Also on that date, they shared victories in friendly matches with Arsenal de Sarandí.

=== July ===
An injury time strike from Marcelino Moreno saw Lanús progress through the Copa Argentina round of thirty-two on 20 July, as they eliminated Independiente Rivadavia of Primera B Nacional. Guillermo Acosta, days after featuring in the Copa Argentina match, headed to Atlético Tucumán on 25 July; seven months after Lanús had signed him from Tucumán. Lanús and Gimnasia y Esgrima shared the points on day one of the 2019–20 Primera División, with Lautaro Valenti netting on his league bow for Granate. Jorge Valdez Chamorro went to Atlanta on 31 July.

=== August ===
Lanús conceded three goals in a fixture away to River Plate in the league on 4 August. Nahuel Tecilla, to join former teammates Valdez Chamorro, Astina and Flores, signed for Atlanta on 7 August. Lanús put four past Barracas Central across two friendly games on 9 August. On 18 August, Lanús defeated Vélez Sarsfield 3–1 for their first Primera División win of the season. Lanús drew 1–1 with Defensores de Belgrano in a mid-season friendly on 21 August. Lanús made it six points from a possible six across their last two matches on 25 August, after Carlos Auzqui and Lautaro Acosta scored to give them victory over Unión Santa Fe. On 30 August, Lanús won their third consecutive league match after beating Central Córdoba at home.

=== September ===
An exhibition game with Almagro opened September for Lanús, as a brace from José Luis Sinisterra was followed by a goal from Gastón Lodico as they achieved a 3–1 win on 3 September.

== Squad ==
Squad No.	Nationality	Name	Position(s)	Date of Birth (age)	Signed from
Goalkeepers
1	Argentina	Agustín Rossi	GK	21 August 1995 (age 31)	Boca Juniors (loan)
12	Argentina	Juan Pablo Cozzani	GK	9 October 1998 (age 28)	Academy
15	Argentina	Guillermo Sara	GK	30 September 1987 (age 39)	Boca Juniors
17	Argentina	Lautaro Morales	GK	16 December 1999 (age 26)	Academy
31	Argentina	Alan González	GK	22 July 1996 (age 30)	Academy
Defenders
2	Brazil	Tiago Pagnussat	CB	17 June 1990 (age 36)	Bahia
3	Paraguay	Darío Cáceres	LB	26 January 1998 (age 28)	Academy
4	Argentina	José Luis Gómez	RB	13 September 1993 (age 33)	Racing Club
6	Argentina	Ezequiel Muñoz	CB	8 October 1990 (age 36)	Leganés
22	Argentina	Matías Pérez	DF	10 February 1990 (age 36)	Academy
23	Paraguay	Rolando García Guerreño	CB	10 February 1990 (age 36)	Unión Santa Fe
24	Argentina	Luciano Abecasis	RB	4 June 1990 (age 36)	Godoy Cruz
25	Argentina	Alexandro Bernabei	DF	24 September 2000 (age 26)	Academy
26	Argentina	Leonel Di Plácido	RB	28 January 1994 (age 32)	All Boys
27	Argentina	Gabriel Carrasco	RB	7 March 1997 (age 29)	Academy
29	Argentina	Nicolás Thaller	CB	7 September 1998 (age 28)	Academy
Midfielders
13	Argentina	Tomás Belmonte	DM	27 May 1998 (age 28)	Academy
14	Argentina	Lucas Vera	MF	18 April 1997 (age 29)	Academy
16	Argentina	Gastón Lodico	LM	28 May 1998 (age 28)	Academy
18	Argentina	Matías Donato	MF	15 January 1999 (age 27)	Academy
19	Argentina	Facundo Quignon	DM	2 May 1993 (age 33)	San Lorenzo
21	Argentina	Nicolás Pasquini	LM	2 January 1991 (age 35)	Academy
28	Argentina	Carlos Auzqui	AM	16 March 1991 (age 35)	River Plate (loan)
	Argentina	Diago Giménez	MF	30 April 1997 (age 29)	Juventud Antoniana
	Argentina	Iván Leszczuk	MF	20 February 1996 (age 30)	Boca Juniors
Forwards
7	Argentina	Lautaro Acosta	FW	14 March 1988 (age 38)	Sevilla
9	Argentina	José Sand	CF	17 July 1980 (age 46)	Deportivo Cali
10	Argentina	Marcelino Moreno	RW	25 June 1994 (age 32)	Talleres
11	Paraguay	Pablo Martínez	RW	30 November 1996 (age 29)	3 de Febrero (loan)
20	Colombia	José Luis Sinisterra	CF	23 July 1998 (age 28)	Valladolid B
30	Argentina	Lautaro Valenti	FW	14 January 1999 (age 27)	Academy
33	Argentina	Nicolás Orsini	LW	12 September 1994 (age 32)	Sarmiento
39	Argentina	Pedro De la Vega	RW	7 February 2001 (age 25)	Academy
	Argentina	Pablo Argañaraz	FW	21 July 1998 (age 28)	Academy
	Argentina	Alan Bonansea	FW	6 May 1996 (age 30)	Academy
	Argentina	Matías González	CF	3 January 1997 (age 29)	Academy
Out on loan					Loaned to
5	Argentina	Leandro Maciel	CM	29 December 1995 (age 30)	Aldosivi
	Argentina	Marcos Astina	MF	21 January 1996 (age 30)	Atlanta
	Argentina	Fernando Barrientos	CM	17 November 1991 (age 34)	Guaraní
	Argentina	Gonzalo Di Renzo	RW	30 December 1995 (age 30)	Deportivo Lara
	Argentina	Leonardo Flores	CB	17 May 1997 (age 29)	Atlanta
	Argentina	Matías Ibáñez	GK	16 December 1986 (age 39)	Patronato
	Argentina	Joel Martínez	CF	10 April 1996 (age 30)	Guillermo Brown
	Argentina	Enzo Ortiz	CB	5 February 1997 (age 29)	Barracas Central
	Argentina	Marcos Pinto	LB	25 January 1994 (age 32)	Barracas Central
	Uruguay	Sebastián Ribas	CF	11 March 1988 (age 38)	Rosario Central
	Argentina	Matías Vera	RW	1998	Barracas Central
	Argentina	Bruno Vides	CF	20 February 1993 (age 33)	Universidad Católica

== Transfers ==
Domestic transfer windows:
3 July 2019 to 24 September 2019
20 January 2020 to 19 February 2020.

=== Transfers in ===
Date from	Position	Nationality	Name	From	Ref.
3 July 2019 (Note: Deal agreed on 11 June 2019)	CB	Argentina	Ezequiel Muñoz	Leganés	
3 July 2019 (Note: Deal agreed on 26 June 2019)	RB	Argentina	Luciano Abecasis	Godoy Cruz	
12 July 2019	LW	Argentina	Nicolás Orsini	Sarmiento	

=== Transfers out ===
Date from	Position	Nationality	Name	To	Ref.
3 July 2019 (Note: Deal agreed on 11 June 2019)	CF	Argentina	Rodrigo Pacheco	Barracas Central	
3 July 2019	MF	Argentina	Júnior Mendieta	Atlético de Rafaela	
3 July 2019	FW	Argentina	Alan Bonansea	Atlético de Rafaela	
5 July 2019	CM	Argentina	Gabriel Ramírez	Quilmes	
8 July 2019	CF	Argentina	Sergio González	Independiente Rivadavia	
14 July 2019	CB	Argentina	Facundo Monteseirin	San Martín	
25 July 2019	CM	Argentina	Guillermo Acosta	Atlético Tucumán	
31 July 2019	CM	Argentina	Jorge Valdez Chamorro	Atlanta	
7 August 2019	CB	Argentina	Nahuel Tecilla	Atlanta	

=== Loans in ===
Start date	Position	Nationality	Name	From	End date	Ref.
3 July 2019 (Note: Deal agreed on 12 June 2019)	GK	Argentina	Agustín Rossi	Boca Juniors	30 June 2020	
17 July 2019	AM	Argentina	Carlos Auzqui	River Plate	30 June 2020	

=== Loans out ===
Start date	Position	Nationality	Name	To	End date	Ref.
3 July 2019 (Note: Deal agreed on 7 June 2019)	RW	Argentina	Matías Vera	Barracas Central	30 June 2020	
3 July 2019 (Note: Deal agreed on 12 June 2019)	CM	Argentina	Leandro Maciel	Aldosivi	30 June 2020	
3 July 2019 (Note: Deal agreed on 21 June 2019)	LB	Argentina	Marcos Pinto	Barracas Central	30 June 2020	
3 July 2019 (Note: Deal agreed on 22 June 2019)	MF	Argentina	Marcos Astina	Atlanta	30 June 2020	
3 July 2019 (Note: Deal agreed on 22 June 2019)	CB	Argentina	Leonardo Flores	Atlanta	30 June 2020	
3 July 2019 (Note: Deal agreed on 29 June 2019)	GK	Argentina	Matías Ibáñez	Patronato	30 June 2020	
4 July 2019	CB	Argentina	Enzo Ortiz	Barracas Central	30 June 2020	
10 July 2019	CM	Argentina	Fernando Barrientos	Guaraní	30 June 2020	
11 July 2019	CF	Uruguay	Sebastián Ribas	Rosario Central	30 June 2020	

== Friendlies ==
=== Pre-season ===
Lanús agreed a pre-season friendly with Atlético Nacional in early June, with the fixture announced to take place at the Estadio Atanasio Girardot in Medellín, Colombia on 4 July 2019. Later friendlies were subsequently set with Argentine Primera División trio Gimnasia y Esgrima, Patronato and Arsenal de Sarandí. Lanús revealed a friendly with 3 de Febrero for 30 June, with the match taking place in Ciudad del Este; where they were having a training camp. However, the meeting was cancelled on 29 June.

Win Draw Loss

30 June 2019 Friendly	3 de Febrero	Cancelled	Lanús	Ciudad del Este, Paraguay
		Lanús

6 July 2019 Friendly	Atlético Nacional	0–0	Lanús	Medellín, Colombia
		Lanús; TyC Sports		Stadium: Estadio Atanasio Girardot; Attendance: 18,122

10 July 2019 Friendly	Lanús	1–0	Gimnasia y Esgrima	Lanús, Argentina
	J. Sand (pen.)	Lanús; Diagonales; 70 min. match		Stadium: Estadio Ciudad de Lanús – Néstor Díaz Pérez; Referee: Ramiro Rivero (Argentina)

10 July 2019 Friendly	Lanús	1–0	Gimnasia y Esgrima	Lanús, Argentina
	P. Martínez	Lanús; Diagonales; 70 min. match		Stadium: Estadio Ciudad de Lanús – Néstor Díaz Pérez; Referee: Ariel López (Argentina)

13 July 2019 Friendly	Lanús	2–2	Patronato	Ezeiza, Argentina
	J. Sand (pen.)	Lanús; InfoRegión	S. Rosales; C. Tarragona	Stadium: Complejo Deportivo de Ezeiza

13 July 2019 Friendly	Lanús	1–2	Patronato	Ezeiza, Argentina
	P. Martínez	Lanús; InfoRegión	M. Komar; F. Dettler	Stadium: Complejo Deportivo de Ezeiza

17 July 2019 Friendly	Lanús	2–1	Arsenal de Sarandí	Lanús, Argentina
	R. García Guerreño; M. Donato	Lanús; TyC Sports; 70 min. match	E. Rescaldani	Stadium: Estadio Ciudad de Lanús – Néstor Díaz Pérez; Referee: Alan González (Argentina)

17 July 2019 Friendly	Lanús	0–2	Arsenal de Sarandí	Lanús, Argentina
		Lanús	L. Parisi; U. Abreliano	Stadium: Estadio Ciudad de Lanús – Néstor Díaz Pérez

=== Mid-season ===
Lanús and Barracas Central would meet in a friendly on 9 August in Ezeiza. Defensores de Belgrano would visit Lanús on 21 August, with Almagro doing the same on 3 September.

Win Draw Loss

9 August 2019 Friendly	Barracas Central	0–3	Lanús	Ezeiza, Argentina
		Lanús; IAM Noticias	L. Di Plácido; E. Gómez; M. Moreno	Stadium: Complejo Deportivo de Ezeiza

9 August 2019 Friendly	Barracas Central	0–1	Lanús	Ezeiza, Argentina
		Lanús; Mundo Ascenso	M. Donato	Stadium: Complejo Deportivo de Ezeiza

21 August 2019 Friendly	Lanús	1–1	Defensores de Belgrano	Lanús, Argentina
11:30 GMT-3	Tiago	Lanús; InfoRegión	E. Aguirre	Stadium: Estadio Ciudad de Lanús – Néstor Díaz Pérez

3 September 2019 Friendly	Lanús	3–1	Almagro	Lanús, Argentina
	J. Sinisterra; G. Lodico	Lanús; Politica del Sur	Goal	Stadium: Estadio Ciudad de Lanús – Néstor Díaz Pérez

== Competitions ==
=== Primera División ===
==== League table ====
Pos	Team	Pld	W	D	L	GF	GA	GD	Pts
5	Argentinos Juniors	23	10	9	4	22	17	+5	39
6	Defensa y Justicia	23	10	6	7	26	18	+8	36
7	Lanús	23	9	9	5	32	29	+3	36
8	San Lorenzo	23	11	3	9	32	30	+2	36
9	Rosario Central	23	9	9	5	31	29	+2	36

Source: AFA
Rules for classification: 1) points; 2) play-off (only if needed to decide championship); 3) goal difference; 4) goals scored; 5) head-to-head points; 6) head-to-head goal difference; 7) head-to-head goals scored.

==== Relegation table ====
Pos	Team	2017–18 Pts	2018–19 Pts	2019–20 Pts	Total Pts	Total Pld	Avg	Relegation
12	Atlético Tucumán	36	42	6	84	57	1.474	
13	Unión	43	36	4	83	57	1.456	
14	Lanús	29	34	10	73	57	1.281	
15	Argentinos Juniors	41	22	9	72	57	1.263	
16	Estudiantes (LP)	36	29	6	71	57	1.246	

Source: AFA

==== Results summary ====
Overall								Home						Away					
Pld	W	D	L	GF	GA	GD	Pts	W	D	L	GF	GA	GD	W	D	L	GF	GA	GD
5	3	1	1	7	6	+1	10	2	1	0	5	2	+3	1	0	1	2	4	−2

Last updated: 31 August 2019.
Source: Soccerway

==== Matches ====
The fixtures for the 2019–20 campaign were released on 10 July.

Win Draw Loss

27 July 2019 1	Lanús	1–1	Gimnasia y Esgrima	Lanús, Argentina
17:45 GMT-3	L. Valenti 21'	Lanús; Infobae; Soccerway	M. García 60'	Stadium: Estadio Ciudad de Lanús – Néstor Díaz Pérez; Referee: Darío Herrera (Argentina)

4 August 2019 2	River Plate	3–0	Lanús	Buenos Aires, Argentina
17:45 GMT-3	R. Borré 23' (pen.); M. Suárez 30', 87'	Lanús; Infobae; Soccerway		Stadium: Estadio Monumental Antonio Vespucio Liberti; Referee: Germán Delfino (Argentina)

18 August 2019 3	Lanús	3–1	Vélez Sarsfield	Lanús, Argentina
17:45 GMT-3	L. Gianetti 48' (o.g.); J. Sand 56' (pen.); N. Orsini 90'	Lanús; Infobae; Soccerway	L. Acosta 51' (o.g.)	Stadium: Estadio Ciudad de Lanús – Néstor Díaz Pérez; Referee: Facundo Tello (Argentina)

25 August 2019 4	Unión Santa Fe	1–2	Lanús	Santa Fe, Argentina
13:15 GMT-3	Y. Gómez Andrade 74'	Lanús; Infobae; Soccerway	C. Auzqui 28'; L. Acosta 58'	Stadium: Estadio 15 de Abril; Referee: Fernando Espinoza (Argentina)

30 August 2019 5	Lanús	1–0	Central Córdoba	Lanús, Argentina
19:00 GMT-3	C. Auzqui 29'	Lanús; Infobae; Soccerway		Stadium: Estadio Ciudad de Lanús – Néstor Díaz Pérez; Referee: Hernán Mastrángelo (Argentina)

6	Independiente	–	Lanús	Avellaneda, Argentina
				Stadium: Estadio Libertadores de América

=== Copa Argentina ===
Lanús versus Independiente Rivadavia, in the Copa Argentina R32, was scheduled for the Estadio Julio Humberto Grondona, a neutral stadium as is normal in the cup, in Avellaneda on 20 July 2019. After defeating the Primera B Nacional team, Lanús were drawn to face Argentinos Juniors in the round of sixteen.

Win Draw Loss

20 July 2019 R32	Lanús	1–0	Independiente Rivadavia	Avellaneda, Argentina
21:10 GMT-3	M. Moreno 90+4'	Lanús; Infobae; Soccerway		Stadium: Estadio Julio Humberto Grondona; Referee: Diego Abal (Argentina)

7 September 2019 R16	Lanús	–	Argentinos Juniors	Sarandí, Argentina
17:10 GMT-3				Stadium: Estadio Julio Humberto Grondona

=== Copa de la Superliga ===
Win Draw Loss

	–
00:00 GMT-3

=== Copa Sudamericana ===
Win Draw Loss

	–
00:00 GMT-3

== Squad statistics ==
=== Appearances and goals ===
No.	Pos.	Nationality	Name	League		Cup		League Cup		Continental		Total		Discipline		Ref
No.	Pos.	Nationality	Name	Apps	Goals	Apps	Goals	Apps	Goals	Apps	Goals	Apps	Goals	Yellow card	Red card	Ref
1	GK	Argentina	Agustín Rossi	5	0	1	0	0	0	0	0	6	0	0	0	
2	CB	Brazil	Tiago Pagnussat	0	0	0	0	0	0	0	0	0	0	0	0	
3	LB	Paraguay	Darío Cáceres	0(1)	0	0	0	0	0	0	0	0(1)	0	0	0	
4	RB	Argentina	José Luis Gómez	0	0	0	0	0	0	0	0	0	0	0	0	
5	CM	Argentina	Leandro Maciel	0	0	0	0	0	0	0	0	0	0	0	0	
6	CB	Argentina	Ezequiel Muñoz	5	0	1	0	0	0	0	0	6	0	0	0	
7	FW	Argentina	Lautaro Acosta	2	1	1	0	0	0	0	0	3	1	0	0	
9	CF	Argentina	José Sand	4	1	1	0	0	0	0	0	5	1	0	0	
10	RW	Argentina	Marcelino Moreno	3	0	1	1	0	0	0	0	4	1	0	0	
11	RW	Paraguay	Pablo Martínez	0(1)	0	0	0	0	0	0	0	0(1)	0	0	0	
12	GK	Argentina	Juan Pablo Cozzani	0	0	0	0	0	0	0	0	0	0	0	0	
13	DM	Argentina	Tomás Belmonte	4(1)	0	0	0	0	0	0	0	4(1)	0	1	0	
14	MF	Argentina	Lucas Vera	5	0	1	0	0	0	0	0	6	0	0	0	
15	GK	Argentina	Guillermo Sara	0	0	0	0	0	0	0	0	0	0	0	0	
16	LM	Argentina	Gastón Lodico	0	0	0	0	0	0	0	0	0	0	0	0	
17	GK	Argentina	Lautaro Morales	0	0	0	0	0	0	0	0	0	0	0	0	
18	MF	Argentina	Matías Donato	0	0	0	0	0	0	0	0	0	0	0	0	
19	DM	Argentina	Facundo Quignon	5	0	1	0	0	0	0	0	6	0	1	0	
20	CF	Colombia	José Luis Sinisterra	0	0	0	0	0	0	0	0	0	0	0	0	
21	LM	Argentina	Nicolás Pasquini	5	0	1	0	0	0	0	0	6	0	3	0	
22	DF	Paraguay	Matías Pérez	0	0	0	0	0	0	0	0	0	0	0	0	
23	CB	Paraguay	Rolando García Guerreño	0	0	0	0	0	0	0	0	0	0	0	0	
24	RB	Argentina	Luciano Abecasis	0	0	0	0	0	0	0	0	0	0	0	0	
25	DF	Argentina	Alexandro Bernabei	0	0	0	0	0	0	0	0	0	0	0	0	
26	RB	Argentina	Leonel Di Plácido	4(1)	0	0(1)	0	0	0	0	0	4(2)	0	2	0	
27	RB	Argentina	Gabriel Carrasco	1(2)	0	1	0	0	0	0	0	2(2)	0	0	0	
28	AM	Argentina	Carlos Auzqui	4(1)	2	0	0	0	0	0	0	4(1)	2	2	0	
29	CB	Argentina	Nicolás Thaller	0	0	0	0	0	0	0	0	0	0	0	0	
30	FW	Argentina	Lautaro Valenti	5	1	1	0	0	0	0	0	6	1	1	0	
31	GK	Argentina	Alan González	0	0	0	0	0	0	0	0	0	0	0	0	
33	LW	Argentina	Nicolás Orsini	0(5)	1	0(1)	0	0	0	0	0	0(6)	1	0	0	
37	CF	Uruguay	Sebastián Ribas	0	0	0	0	0	0	0	0	0	0	0	0	
39	RW	Argentina	Pedro De la Vega	1(3)	0	0	0	0	0	0	0	1(3)	0	1	0	
–	FW	Argentina	Pablo Argañaraz	0	0	0	0	0	0	0	0	0	0	0	0	
–	MF	Argentina	Marcos Astina	0	0	0	0	0	0	0	0	0	0	0	0	
–	FW	Argentina	Alan Bonansea	0	0	0	0	0	0	0	0	0	0	0	0	
–	CM	Argentina	Fernando Barrientos	0	0	0	0	0	0	0	0	0	0	0	0	
–	RW	Argentina	Gonzalo Di Renzo	0	0	0	0	0	0	0	0	0	0	0	0	
–	CB	Argentina	Leonardo Flores	0	0	0	0	0	0	0	0	0	0	0	0	
–	MF	Argentina	Diago Giménez	0	0	0	0	0	0	0	0	0	0	0	0	
–	CF	Argentina	Matías González	0	0	0	0	0	0	0	0	0	0	0	0	
–	GK	Argentina	Matías Ibáñez	0	0	0	0	0	0	0	0	0	0	0	0	
–	MF	Argentina	Iván Leszczuk	0	0	0	0	0	0	0	0	0	0	0	0	
–	CF	Argentina	Joel Martínez	0	0	0	0	0	0	0	0	0	0	0	0	
–	CB	Argentina	Enzo Ortiz	0	0	0	0	0	0	0	0	0	0	0	0	
–	LB	Argentina	Marcos Pinto	0	0	0	0	0	0	0	0	0	0	0	0	
–	RW	Argentina	Matías Vera	0	0	0	0	0	0	0	0	0	0	0	0	
–	CF	Argentina	Bruno Vides	0	0	0	0	0	0	0	0	0	0	0	0	
Own goals				—	0	—	0	—	0	—	0	—	0	—	—	—
Players who left during the season
14	CM	Argentina	Guillermo Acosta	1	0	1	0	0	0	0	0	2	0	0	0	

Statistics accurate as of 31 August 2019.

=== Goalscorers ===
Rank	Pos	No.	Nat	Name	League	Cup	League Cup	Continental	Total	Ref
1	AM	28	Argentina	Carlos Auzqui	2	0	0	0	2	
2	RW	10	Argentina	Marcelino Moreno	0	1	0	0	1	
2	FW	30	Argentina	Lautaro Valenti	1	0	0	0	1	
2	CF	9	Argentina	José Sand	1	0	0	0	1	
2	LW	33	Argentina	Nicolás Orsini	1	0	0	0	1	
2	FW	7	Argentina	Lautaro Acosta	1	0	0	0	1	
Own goals					1	0	0	0	1	
Totals					7	1	0	0	8	—
