= Gabriel Ramírez =

Gabriel Ramírez may refer to:

- Gabriel Ramírez (footballer, born 1982), Uruguayan forward
- Gabriel Ramírez (footballer, born 1995), Argentine midfielder
