= Pablo Martínez =

Pablo Martínez may refer to:

- Pablo Martínez (actor) (born 1987), Argentine actor
- Pablo Martínez (shortstop) (born 1969), Dominican baseball player
- Pablo Martínez (canoeist)
- Pablo Martinez (French footballer) (born 1989), defender for Racing Club de Strasbourg Alsace
- Pablo Martínez (pitcher) (1898–?), Cuban baseball player
- Pablo Martínez (Paraguayan footballer) (born 1996), forward for Club Atlético Lanús
- Pablo Martínez (Spanish footballer) (born 1998), midfielder for UD San Sebastián de los Reyes
- Pablo Martínez (Uruguayan footballer) (born 1989), midfielder for Club Sportivo Cerrito
- Pablo Martinez (Welsh footballer) (born 2000), English-Welsh footballer
