= Monteseirín =

Monteseirín is a surname. Notable people with the surname include:

- Alfredo Sánchez Monteseirín (1957–2026), Spanish politician
- Facundo Monteseirín (born 1995), Argentine footballer
