= Elías Gómez =

Elías Gómez may refer to:

- Elías Gómez (footballer, born 1986), Argentine goalkeeper
- Elías Gómez (footballer, born 1994), Argentine defender
