= Nicolás Thaller =

Argentine footballer

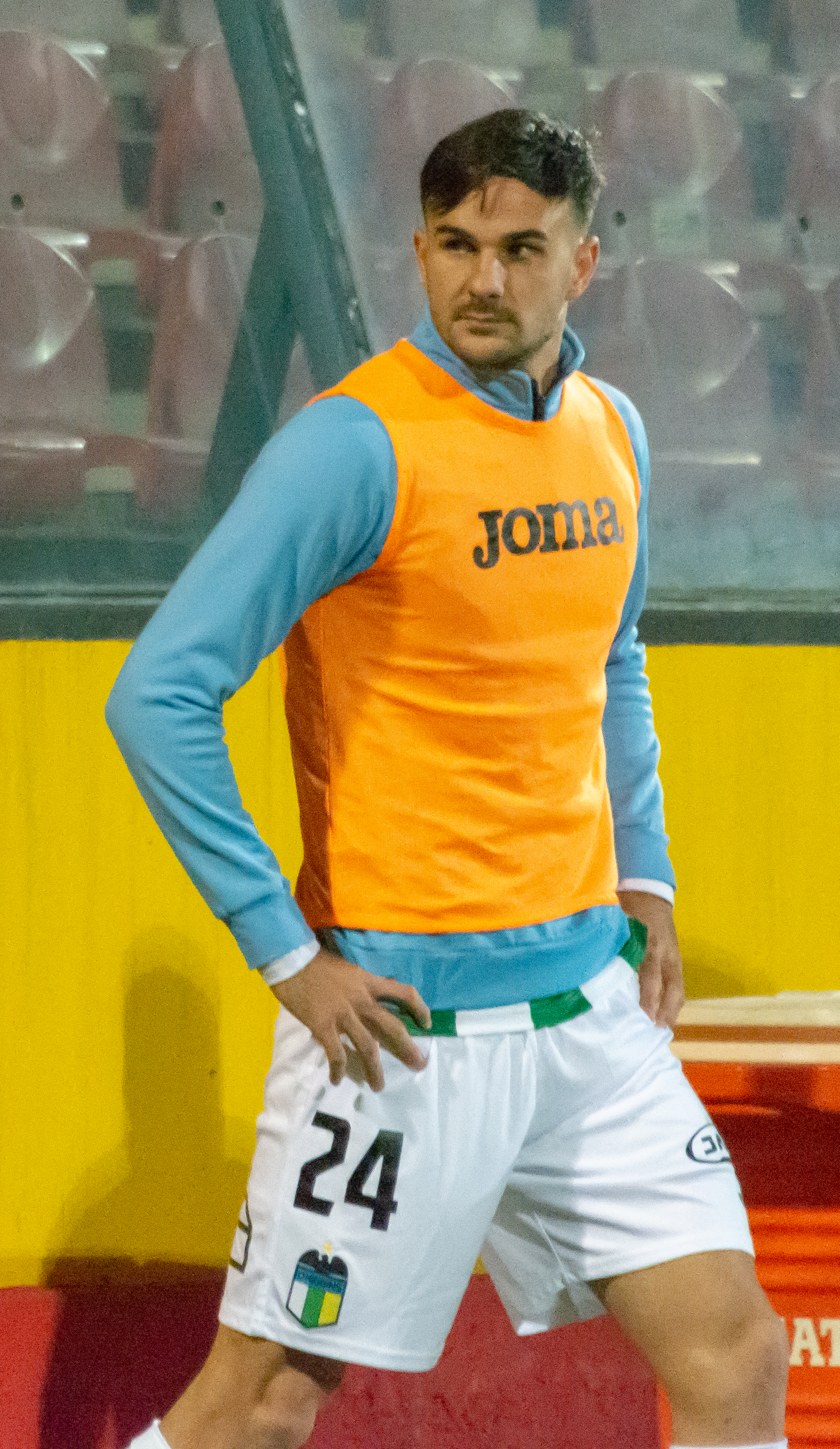
- Thaller in 2023.

Personal information
- Full name: Nicolás Alejandro Thaller
- Date of birth: 7 September 1998 (age 28)
- Place of birth: Lanús, Argentina
- Height: 1.85 m (6 ft 1 in)
- Position: Centre-back

Team information
- Current team: Colón

Youth career
- Lanús

Senior career*
Years	Team	Apps	(Gls)
2018–2024	Lanús	44	(2)
2022	→ Atlético Tucumán (loan)	16	(0)
2023	→ O'Higgins (loan)	23	(0)
2025–	Colón	23	(0)
- * Club domestic league appearances and goals as of 18:29, 20 March 2026 (UTC)

Nicolás Alejandro Thaller (born 7 September 1998) is an Argentine professional footballer who plays as a centre-back for Colón.

== Career ==
Thaller began his career with Lanús. He made his professional debut in an Argentine Primera División fixture with Patronato, being substituted on with eight minutes to go for Marcelo Herrera on 27 January 2018. A continental debut in the 2018 Copa Sudamericana followed a month later against Sporting Cristal, which was one of nine appearances Thaller made during 2017–18. In his second league appearance of 2018–19, Thaller scored his first goal in a 2–2 draw away to San Lorenzo.

On 18 January 2022, Thaller joined Atlético Tucumán on a one-year loan deal with a purchase option.

In 2023, he was loaned to Chilean side O'Higgins.

== Career statistics ==
As of 27 September 2018.

Club statistics
Club	Season	League			Cup (Note: Includes the Copa Argentina)		League Cup		Continental (Note: Includes the Copa Libertadores and Copa Sudamericana)		Other		Total	
Club	Season	Division	Apps	Goals	Apps	Goals	Apps	Goals	Apps	Goals	Apps	Goals	Apps	Goals
Lanús	2017–18	Primera División	8	0	0	0	—		1 (Note: One appearance in the 2018 Copa Sudamericana)	0	0	0	9	0
Lanús	2018–19	Primera División	2	1	1	0	—		1 (Note: One appearance in the 2018 Copa Sudamericana)	0	0	0	4	1
Career total			10	1	1	0	—		2	0	0	0	13	1
