= Enzo Ortiz =

Argentine footballer

Personal information
- Full name: Enzo Gabriel Ortiz
- Date of birth: 5 February 1997 (age 29)
- Place of birth: Córdoba, Argentina
- Height: 1.85 m (6 ft 1 in)
- Position: Centre-back

Team information
- Current team: Brown de Adrogué

Youth career
- Las Palmas
- 2012–2018: Lanús

Senior career*
Years	Team	Apps	(Gls)
2018–2020	Lanús	7	(0)
2018–2019	→ Brown de Adrogué (loan)	23	(0)
2019–2020	→ Barracas Central (loan)	11	(1)
2020	Mitre	0	(0)
2021–	Brown de Adrogué	31	(1)
- * Club domestic league appearances and goals as of 19:14, 29 June 2022 (UTC)

Enzo Gabriel Ortiz (born 5 February 1997) is an Argentine professional footballer who plays as a centre-back for Brown de Adrogué.

== Career ==
Ortiz played for Las Palmas before being signed by Lanús in 2012. He was promoted into Lanús' first-team during the 2017–18 Argentine Primera División campaign, being moved mid-season which led to him making his professional debut in a match with Belgrano, a team he supported as a youngster, on 2 February 2018. Overall, Ortiz featured eight times in 2017–18; which also included a Copa Sudamericana bow versus Sporting Cristal weeks after debuting in the league. On 28 June 2016, Primera B Nacional's Brown completed the loan signing of Ortiz. Twenty-six appearances followed for the Adrogué club.

July 2019 saw Ortiz loaned to Barracas Central. His first senior goal arrived on 10 November during a 1–1 draw with Atlanta.

On 9 February 2022, Ortiz returned to his former club, Primera Nacional side Brown de Adrogué.

== Career statistics ==
As of 14 July 2020.

Club statistics
Club	Season	League			Cup		League Cup		Continental		Other		Total	
Club	Season	Division	Apps	Goals	Apps	Goals	Apps	Goals	Apps	Goals	Apps	Goals	Apps	Goals
Lanús	2017–18	Primera División	7	0	0	0	—		1 (Note: Appearance(s) in the Copa Sudamericana)	0	0	0	8	0
Lanús	2018–19	Primera División	0	0	0	0	0	0	0	0	0	0	0	0
Lanús	2019–20	Primera División	0	0	0	0	0	0	0	0	0	0	0	0
Lanús	Total		7	0	0	0	0	0	1	0	0	0	8	0
Brown (loan)	2018–19	Primera B Nacional	23	0	3	0	—		—		0	0	26	0
Barracas Central (loan)	2019–20	Primera B Nacional	11	1	0	0	—		—		0	0	11	1
Career total			41	1	3	0	0	0	1	0	0	0	45	1
