= Leonardo Flores =

Leonardo Flores may refer to:

- Leonardo Flores (footballer, born 1995), midfielder for Atlético Bucaramanga
- Leonardo Flores (footballer, born 1997), defender for Atlético Rafaela
- Leonardo Flores (footballer, born 2003), forward for Atlético San Luis
- Monkey Black (born 1986), Dominican singer, real name Leonardo Flores
