= 2017–18 Club Atlético Lanús season =

Club Atlético Lanús
2017–18 season
- Chairman: Nicolás Russo
- Manager: Jorge Almirón (until 1 December 2017); Ezequiel Carboni (from 2 December 2017)
- Stadium: Estadio Ciudad de Lanús – Néstor Díaz Pérez
- Primera División: 22nd
- 2016–17 Copa Argentina: Round of 32
- 2017–18 Copa Argentina: Round of 64
- 2017 Copa Libertadores: Runners-up
- 2018 Copa Sudamericana: First stage
- Top goalscorer: League: José Sand (5); All: José Sand (10)

The 2017–18 season is Club Atlético Lanús' 27th consecutive season in the top-flight of Argentine football. The season covers the period from 1 July 2017 to 30 June 2018.

== Current squad ==
As of 7 September 2017.

Note: Flags indicate national team as defined under FIFA eligibility rules; some limited exceptions apply. Players may hold more than one non-FIFA nationality.

| No. | Pos. | Nation | Player |
|---|---|---|---|
| 1 | GK | ARG | Fernando Monetti |
| 2 | DF | ARG | Marcelo Herrera |
| 3 | DF | ARG | Maximiliano Velázquez |
| 4 | DF | ARG | José Gómez |
| 6 | DF | ARG | Diego Braghieri |
| 7 | FW | ARG | Lautaro Acosta |
| 8 | MF | ARG | Fernando Barrientos |
| 9 | FW | ARG | José Sand |
| 16 | FW | URU | Alejandro Silva |
| 17 | FW | ARG | Germán Denis |
| 19 | MF | ARG | Nicolás Aguirre |
| 21 | MF | ARG | Nicolás Pasquini |
| 22 | DF | ARG | Santiago Zurbriggen |
| 23 | DF | PAR | Rolando García |
| 24 | MF | ARG | Leandro Maciel |

| No. | Pos. | Nation | Player |
|---|---|---|---|
| 25 | FW | ARG | Marcelino Moreno |
| 27 | MF | ARG | Román Martínez |
| 28 | GK | ARG | Nicolás Avellaneda |
| 30 | MF | ARG | Iván Marcone |
| 31 | GK | ARG | Esteban Andrada |
| 33 | DF | ARG | Gabriel Carrasco |
| — | MF | ARG | Diago Giménez |
| — | MF | ARG | Facundo Castillón (on loan from Racing Club) |
| — | DF | ARG | Ignacio Canuto (on loan from Atlético Tucumán) |
| — | FW | ARG | Joel Martínez |
| — | MF | ARG | Jorge Valdez Chamorro |
| — | GK | ARG | Juan Noce |
| — | DF | ARG | Leonel Di Plácido |
| — | FW | ARG | Matías González |
| — | GK | ARG | Matías Ibáñez |

=== Out on loan ===
Note: Flags indicate national team as defined under FIFA eligibility rules; some limited exceptions apply. Players may hold more than one non-FIFA nationality.

| No. | Pos. | Nation | Player |
|---|---|---|---|
| 13 | DF | ARG | Marcos Pinto (at Temperley until 30 June 2018) |
| 20 | DF | ARG | Facundo Monteseirín (at Arsenal de Sarandí until 30 June 2018) |
| — | FW | ARG | Alan Bonansea (at Almagro until 30 June 2018) |
| — | MF | ARG | Cristian Ramírez (at Talleres until 30 June 2018) |
| — | MF | ARG | Gabriel Ramírez (at Talleres until 30 June 2018) |

| No. | Pos. | Nation | Player |
|---|---|---|---|
| — | DF | ARG | Gonzalo Di Renzo (at Patronato until 30 June 2018) |
| — | MF | ARG | Marcos Astina (at Atlético San Luis until 30 June 2018) |
| — | DF | ARG | Nahuel Tecilla (at Atlanta until 30 June 2018) |
| — | FW | ARG | Rodrigo Pacheco (at Los Angeles FC until 31 December 2018) |
| — | FW | ARG | Sergio González (at San Martín until 30 June 2018) |

== Transfers ==
=== In ===
| Date | Pos. | Name | From | Fee |
|---|---|---|---|---|
| 1 July 2017 | DF | (Argentina) José Gómez | (Argentina) Racing Club | Undisclosed |
| 4 July 2017 | MF | (Argentina) Diago Giménez | (Argentina) Juventud Antoniana | Undisclosed |
| 17 August 2017 | DF | (Argentina) Leonel Di Plácido | (Argentina) All Boys | Undisclosed |

=== Out ===
| Date | Pos. | Name | To | Fee |
|---|---|---|---|---|
| 1 July 2017 | MF | (Argentina) Agustín Pelletieri | Released | |
| 1 July 2017 | MF | (Argentina) Matías Arias | (Argentina) Sarmiento | Undisclosed |
| 24 July 2017 | DF | (Argentina) Axel Ochoa | (Argentina) Atlanta | Undisclosed |
| 31 July 2017 | MF | (Argentina) Joaquín Ibáñez | (Argentina) Arsenal de Sarandí | Undisclosed |

=== Loan in ===
| Date from | Date to | Pos. | Name | From |
|---|---|---|---|---|
| 12 July 2017 | 30 June 2018 | DF | (Argentina) Ignacio Canuto | (Argentina) Atlético Tucumán |
| 14 August 2017 | 30 June 2018 | MF | (Argentina) Facundo Castillón | (Argentina) Racing Club |

=== Loan out ===
| Date from | Date to | Pos. | Name | To |
|---|---|---|---|---|
| 1 July 2017 | 30 June 2018 | DF | (Argentina) Facundo Monteseirín | (Argentina) Arsenal de Sarandí |
| 1 July 2017 | 30 June 2018 | MF | (Argentina) Marcos Astina | (Mexico) Atlético San Luis |
| 20 July 2017 | 30 June 2018 | MF | (Argentina) Cristian Ramírez | (Argentina) Talleres |
| 22 July 2017 | 30 June 2018 | FW | (Argentina) Gonzalo Di Renzo | (Argentina) Patronato |
| 24 July 2017 | 30 June 2018 | DF | (Argentina) Nahuel Tecilla | (Argentina) Atlanta |
| 2 August 2017 | 30 June 2018 | DF | (Argentina) Marcos Pinto | (Argentina) Temperley |
| 2 August 2017 | 30 June 2018 | FW | (Argentina) Sergio González | (Argentina) San Martín |
| 23 August 2017 | 30 June 2018 | MF | (Argentina) Gabriel Ramírez | (Argentina) Talleres |
| 1 September 2017 | 30 June 2018 | FW | (Argentina) Alan Bonansea | (Argentina) Almagro |
| 6 September 2017 | 31 December 2018 | FW | (Argentina) Rodrigo Pacheco | (United States) Los Angeles FC |

== Friendlies ==
=== Pre-season ===
Win Draw Loss

| 25 July 2017 Friendly | Talleres Reserves (Argentina) | 0–5 | (Argentina) Lanús | Córdoba, Argentina |
| 10:30 | | Report | J. Sand; A. Silva; R. Martínez | Stadium: Predio Amadeo Nuccetelli; Referee: Martín Bravo (Argentina) |

| 25 July 2017 Friendly | Talleres Reserves (Argentina) | 1–3 | (Argentina) Lanús | Córdoba, Argentina |
| 12:00 | A. Díaz | Report | G. Denis; M. Rojas | Stadium: Predio Amadeo Nuccetelli; Referee: Martín Bravo (Argentina) |

| 28 July 2017 Friendly | Belgrano Reserves (Argentina) | 0–1 | (Argentina) Lanús | Córdoba, Argentina |
| 10:15 | | Report | J. Sand | Stadium: Villa Esquiú Academy; Referee: David Guzmán (Argentina) |

| 28 July 2017 Friendly | Belgrano Reserves (Argentina) | 0–1 | (Argentina) Lanús | Córdoba, Argentina |
| 11:45 | | Report | G. Denis | Stadium: Villa Esquiú Academy; Referee: David Guzmán (Argentina) |

== Primera División ==
=== League table ===
| Pos | Team | Pld | W | D | L | GF | GA | GD | Pts | Qualification |
|---|---|---|---|---|---|---|---|---|---|---|
| 20 | Rosario Central | 27 | 8 | 8 | 11 | 30 | 41 | −11 | 32 | Qualification for Copa Libertadores group stage (Note: Rosario Central qualified for the Copa Libertadores group stage by winning the 2017–18 Copa Argentina.) |
| 21 | Newell's Old Boys (Note: Newell's Old Boys were deducted one point for debts owed to former players. Originally AFA partially accepted the appeal by Newell's Old Boys reducing the penalty from three points to one point but a new appeal by Lanús overturned the decision. Finally, on 28 June 2019 CAS gave back two points to Newell´s Old Boys reducing the penalty to one point again.) | 27 | 8 | 6 | 13 | 23 | 28 | −5 | 29 | |
| 22 | Lanús | 27 | 6 | 11 | 10 | 20 | 37 | −17 | 29 | |
| 23 | Gimnasia y Esgrima (LP) | 27 | 7 | 6 | 14 | 28 | 43 | −15 | 27 | |
| 24 | Tigre | 27 | 4 | 12 | 11 | 26 | 33 | −7 | 24 | |

Source: AFA
Rules for classification: 1) points; 2) play-off (only if needed to decide championship); 3) goal difference; 4) goals scored; 5) head-to-head points; 6) head-to-head goal difference; 7) head-to-head goals scored.

=== Results by matchday ===
| Matchday | 1 | 2 | 3 | 4 | 5 | 6 | 7 | 8 | 9 | 10 | 11 | 12 | 13 | 14 | 15 | 16 | 17 | 18 | 19 | 20 | 21 | 22 | 23 | 24 | 25 | 26 | 27 |
|---|---|---|---|---|---|---|---|---|---|---|---|---|---|---|---|---|---|---|---|---|---|---|---|---|---|---|---|
| Ground | A | H | A | H | A | H | A | H | A | A | H | A | H | | | | | | | | | | | | | | |
| Result | L | L | W | W | W | W | L | L | L | P | D | L | | | | | | | | | | | | | | | |
| Position | 26 | 27 | 21 | 13 | 9 | 5 | 10 | 14 | 17 | 20 | 20 | 22 | | | | | | | | | | | | | | | |

Updated to match(es) played on 12 December 2017. Source: Soccerway
A = Away; H = Home; W = Win; D = Draw; L = Loss; P = Postponed

| 26 August 2017 1 | Talleres (Argentina) | 5–2 | (Argentina) Lanús | Córdoba, Argentina |
| 18:05 | J. Arias 87'; S. Palacios 61' (pen.), 70'; J. Menéndez 87'; M. Torres 90+4' | Report | R. Martínez 57'; G. Denis 83' | Stadium: Estadio Mario Alberto Kempes; Referee: Mauro Vigliano (Argentina) |

| 10 September 2017 2 | Lanús (Argentina) | 0–1 | (Argentina) Boca Juniors | Lanús, Argentina |
| 20:05 | | Report | D. Benedetto 84' | Stadium: Estadio Ciudad de Lanús – Néstor Díaz Pérez; Referee: Fernando Echenique (Argentina) |

| 16 September 2017 3 | Independiente (Argentina) | 0–1 | (Argentina) Lanús | Avellaneda, Argentina |
| 20:05 | | Report | G. Denis 90+6' (pen.) | Stadium: Estadio Libertadores de América; Referee: Fernando Espinoza (Argentina) |

| 25 September 2017 4 | Lanús (Argentina) | 1–0 | (Argentina) Newell's Old Boys | Rosario, Argentina |
| 19:05 | A. Silva 61' | Report | | Stadium: Estadio Ciudad de Lanús – Néstor Díaz Pérez; Referee: Fernando Rapallini (Argentina) |

| 30 September 2017 5 | Gimnasia y Esgrima (Argentina) | 1–3 | (Argentina) Lanús | Buenos Aires, Argentina |
| 18:05 | N. Mazzola 71' | Report | J. Sand 2', 45+3' (pen.), 69' (pen.) | Stadium: Estadio Juan Carmelo Zerillo; Referee: Patricio Loustau (Argentina) |

| 13 October 2017 6 | Lanús (Argentina) | 2–1 | (Argentina) Unión Santa Fe | Lanús, Argentina |
| 19:05 | J. Sand 61', 66' | Report | J. Bottinelli 36' | Stadium: Estadio Ciudad de Lanús – Néstor Díaz Pérez; Referee: Juan Pompei (Argentina) |

| 28 October 2017 7 | Huracán (Argentina) | 4–0 | (Argentina) Lanús | Buenos Aires, Argentina |
| 14:00 | R. Ábila 12', 49'; A. Romero 34'; M. González 81' | Report | | Stadium: Estadio Tomás Adolfo Ducó; Referee: Jorge Baliño (Argentina) |

| 4 November 2017 8 | Lanús (Argentina) | 0–2 | (Argentina) Olimpo | Lanús, Argentina |
| 14:05 | | Report | D. Depetris 25'; F. Troyansky 68' | Stadium: Estadio Ciudad de Lanús – Néstor Díaz Pérez; Referee: Silvio Trucco (Argentina) |

| 18 November 2017 9 | Defensa y Justicia (Argentina) | 3–0 | (Argentina) Lanús | Buenos Aires, Argentina |
| 17:00 | N. Fernández 46', 49'; J. Kaprof 60' (pen.) | Report | | Stadium: Estadio Norberto "Tito" Tomaghello; Referee: Juan Pompei (Argentina) |

| 26 November 2017 10 | Godoy Cruz (Argentina) | Postponed | (Argentina) Lanús | Mendoza, Argentina |
| 17:00 | | Report | | Stadium: Estadio Malvinas Argentinas; Referee: Darío Herrera (Argentina) |

| 4 December 2017 11 | Lanús (Argentina) | 0–0 | (Argentina) Vélez Sarsfield | Lanús, Argentina |
| 17:00 | | Report | | Stadium: Estadio Ciudad de Lanús – Néstor Díaz Pérez; Referee: Jorge Baliño (Argentina) |

| 11 December 2017 12 | Chacarita Juniors (Argentina) | 3–0 | (Argentina) Lanús | Villa Maipú, Argentina |
| 21:30 | M. Rodríguez 14'; F. Rosso 19', 53' | Report | | Stadium: Estadio de Chacarita Juniors; Referee: Nicolás Lamolina (Argentina) |

| January 2018 13 | Lanús (Argentina) | – | (Argentina) Patronato | Lanús, Argentina |
| | | Report | | Stadium: Estadio Ciudad de Lanús – Néstor Díaz Pérez |

== Copa Argentina ==
Win Draw Loss

| 16 August 2017 R32 | Lanús (Argentina) | 1–2 | (Argentina) Unión Santa Fe | Avellaneda, Argentina |
| 21:10 | A. Silva 34' | Report | M. de Iriondo 40'; L. Gamba 64' | Stadium: Estadio Julio Humberto Grondona; Referee: Federico Beligoy (Argentina) |

== Copa Libertadores ==
Win Draw Loss

=== Second stage ===
| 6 July 2017 First leg | The Strongest (Bolivia) | 1–1 | (Argentina) Lanús | La Paz, Bolivia |
| 19:15 | D. Bejarano 90+1' | Report | N. Pasquini 36' | Stadium: Estadio Hernando Siles; Referee: Wilton Sampaio (Brazil) |

| 8 August 2017 Second leg | Lanús (Argentina) | 1–0 (agg: 2–1) | (Bolivia) The Strongest | Lanús, Argentina |
| 19:15 | J. Sand 84' | Report | | Stadium: Estadio Ciudad de Lanús – Néstor Díaz Pérez; Referee: Andrés Cunha (Uruguay) |

=== Quarter-finals ===
| 13 September 2017 First leg | San Lorenzo (Argentina) | 2–0 | (Argentina) Lanús | Buenos Aires, Argentina |
| 19:15 | N. Blandi 34', 51' (pen.) | Report | | Stadium: Estadio Pedro Bidegain; Referee: Wilmar Roldán (Colombia) |

| 21 September 2017 Second leg | Lanús (Argentina) | 2–0 (agg: 2–2) (4–3 p) | (Argentina) San Lorenzo | Lanús, Argentina |
| 21:45 | J. Sand 11'; N. Pasquini 16' | Report | | Stadium: Estadio Ciudad de Lanús – Néstor Díaz Pérez; Referee: Enrique Cáceres (Paraguay) |
| | Penalties |
| | A. Silva (penalty scored); N. Pasquini (penalty scored); D. Braghieri (penalty scored); L. Acosta (penalty scored) | | F. Belluschi (penalty scored); M. Caruzzo (penalty missed); G. Rodríguez (penalty scored); R. Botta (penalty scored); N. Blandi (penalty missed) |

=== Semi-finals ===
| 24 October 2017 First leg | River Plate (Argentina) | 1–0 | (Argentina) Lanús | Buenos Aires, Argentina |
| 19:15 | I. Scocco 82' | Report | | Stadium: Estadio Monumental Antonio Vespucio Liberti; Referee: Wilton Sampaio (Brazil) |

| 31 October 2017 Second leg | Lanús (Argentina) | 4–2 (agg: 4–3) | (Argentina) River Plate | Lanús, Argentina |
| 21:15 | J. Sand 45+1', 46'; L. Acosta 62'; A. Silva 69' (pen.) | Report | I. Scocco 18' (pen.); G. Montiel 23' | Stadium: Estadio Ciudad de Lanús – Néstor Díaz Pérez; Referee: Wilmar Roldán (Colombia) |

=== Finals ===
| 22 November 2017 First leg | Grêmio (Brazil) | 1–0 | (Argentina) Lanús | Porto Alegre, Brazil |
| 20:45 | Cícero 83' | Report | | Stadium: Arena do Grêmio; Referee: Julio Bascuñán (Chile) |

| 29 November 2017 Second leg | Lanús (Argentina) | 1–2 (agg: 1–3) | (Brazil) Grêmio | Lanús, Argentina |
| 20:45 | J. Sand 72' (pen.) | Report | Fernandinho 27'; Luan 42' | Stadium: Estadio Ciudad de Lanús – Néstor Díaz Pérez; Referee: Enrique Cáceres (Paraguay) |

== Copa Sudamericana ==
Win Draw Loss

| – |
