= Alexandro Bernabei =

Argentine footballer

Personal information
- Full name: Alexandro Ezequiel Bernabei
- Date of birth: 24 September 2000 (age 26)
- Place of birth: Correa, Argentina
- Height: 1.69 m (5 ft 7 in)
- Position: Left-back

Team information
- Current team: Internacional
- Number: 26

Youth career
- Lanús

Senior career*
Years	Team	Apps	(Gls)
2019–2022	Lanús	62	(2)
2022–2025	Celtic	23	(1)
2024	→ Internacional (loan)	23	(3)
2025–	Internacional	44	(1)

International career^{‡}
2018	Argentina U19		
2021–	Argentina U23	2	(0)
- * Club domestic league appearances and goals as of 1 March 2025 ‡ National team caps and goals as of 29 March 2021

Alexandro Ezequiel Bernabéi (born 24 September 2000) is an Argentine professional footballer who plays as a left-back for Brazilian club Internacional. He previously played for Lanús and Celtic.

== Club career ==
=== Lanús ===
Bernabei came through the youth ranks of Lanús, with manager Luis Zubeldía promoting the defender into his first-team squad during the 2019–20 campaign. Bernabei's senior bow arrived on 19 October 2019, as he was selected to start a Primera División fixture with Talleres. He scored six minutes into his debut, prior to being substituted in the second half for Nicolás Orsini in an eventual 4–2 win at the Estadio Mario Alberto Kempes. In his thirtieth career appearance on 13 January 2021, Bernabei scored in a Copa Sudamericana semi-final second leg victory at home to Vélez Sarsfield.

=== Celtic ===
Scottish Premiership club Celtic signed Bernabei in June 2022 for a fee of around £3.75 million. He made his competitive debut for the club on 28 August 2022 as a late substitute in a 9–0 win against Dundee United at Tannadice Park in the Scottish Premiership.

On 11 October 2022, Bernabei came on as an 80th-minute substitute to make his UEFA Champions League debut in a 2–0 loss against RB Leipzig at Celtic Park.

On 2 April 2023, Bernabei scored his first Celtic goal against Ross County in the Scottish Premiership.

=== Internacional ===
On 7 March 2024, Bernabei was loaned out to Internacional for the 2024 season. On 1 September 2024, he scored his first goal for the club, in a 3–1 win against Juventude. On 9 January 2025, Bernabei signed a four-year permanent transfer deal with Internacional for £4.5 million.

== International career ==
Bernabei represented Argentina's U19s at the 2018 South American Games in Bolivia.

Bernabei completed a permanent move to Internacional in January 2025, after initially joining the Brazilian club on loan in March 2024.

== Career statistics ==
As of match played on 5 December 2024

Appearances and goals by club, season and competition
Club	Season	League			National cup		League cup		Continental		Total	
Club	Season	Division	Apps	Goals	Apps	Goals	Apps	Goals	Apps	Goals	Apps	Goals
Lanús	2019–20	Primera División	13	1	2	0	1	0	1 (Note: Appearance(s) in Copa Sudamericana)	0	17	1
Lanús	2020–21 (Note: Soccerway counts Copa de la Liga Profesional appearances as league appearances)	Primera División	5	0	1	0	0	0	9	1	15	1
Lanús	2021	Primera División	35	1	0	0	0	0	5	0	40	1
Lanús	2022	Primera División	9	0	1	0	0	0	6	2	16	2
Lanús	Total		62	2	4	0	1	0	21	3	88	5
Celtic	2022–23	Scottish Premiership	15	1	1	0	2	0	1 (Note: Appearance(s) in UEFA Champions League)	0	19	1
Celtic	2023–24	Scottish Premiership	8	0	1	0	0	0	0	0	9	0
Celtic	Total		23	1	2	0	2	0	1	0	28	1
Internacional (loan)	2024	Série A	23	3	0	0	—		2 (Note: Appearance(s) in Copa Sudamericana)	0	25	3
Career total			108	5	6	0	3	0	24	3	141	9

== Honours ==
Celtic

- Scottish Premiership: 2022–23, 2023–24
- Scottish League Cup: 2022–23
- Scottish Cup: 2022–23

Internacional

- Campeonato Gaúcho: 2025

Individual

- Campeonato Brasileiro Série A Team of the Year: 2024
- Bola de Prata: 2024
