= José Luis Sinisterra =

Colombian footballer (born 1998)

Personal information
- Full name: José Luis Sinisterra Castillo
- Date of birth: 23 July 1998 (age 28)
- Place of birth: Buenaventura, Colombia
- Height: 1.71 m (5 ft 7 1/2 in)
- Position: Winger

Team information
- Current team: Deportivo Garcilaso
- Number: 11

Youth career
- Sporting de Buenaventura
- Palmeiras
- Santos
- Corinthians
- Defensa y Justicia
- Quilmes
- Lanús
- Atlético Nacional

Senior career*
Years	Team	Apps	(Gls)
2016–2017	Valladolid B	13	(0)
2018–2021	Lanús	5	(1)
2020–2021	→ Platense (loan)	16	(0)
2021	San Martín T.	15	(0)
2022–2023	Deportivo Pereira	32	(1)
2023–2024	Club Blooming	25	(3)
2024	Sportivo Trinidense	7	(1)
2024–2025	Oakland Roots SC	24	(3)
2025–	Garcilaso		

International career
- Colombia U17
- * Club domestic league appearances and goals as of 15:46, 30 October 2025 (UTC)

José Luis Sinisterra Castillo (born 23 July 1998) is a Colombian professional footballer who plays as a winger for Deportivo Garcilaso.

== Career ==
Sinisterra's youth career started with Sporting de Buenaventura, prior to leaving Colombia at the age of 14 to join Palmeiras. His stay lasted one year, preceding further spells in Brazil with Santos and Corinthians. After departing the latter, Sinisterra moved to Argentina where he played for the academies of Defensa y Justicia, Quilmes and Lanús; during which time he also had a trial with River Plate. He then had a period back in Colombia with Atlético Nacional, which occurred before a move to Spain's Valladolid B. Sinisterra's senior career began with Valladolid B, making his debut in Segunda División B versus Guijuelo in September 2016.

He made a further twelve appearances for the Spanish club in the 2016–17 campaign. He appeared as an unused substitute on five occasions in the following season, 2017–18, though failed to make an appearance, subsequently departing at the end of 2017. In January 2018, Sinisterra rejoined Lanús of Argentine Primera División. His professional debut arrived on 7 October against Atlético Tucumán, which preceded his first goal two weeks later versus Patronato. After eight appearances for Lanús, Sinisterra departed in January 2020 on loan to Primera B Nacional's Platense.

After a spell at San Martín de Tucumán in 2021, Sinisterra returned to Colombia in January 2022, when he signed with Deportivo Pereira.

Sinisterra signed with Oakland Roots SC in August 2024. Sinisterra transferred to Deportivo Garcilaso in July 2025.

== Career statistics ==
As of 17 September 2020.

Club statistics
Club	Season	League			Cup		League Cup		Continental		Other		Total	
Club	Season	Division	Apps	Goals	Apps	Goals	Apps	Goals	Apps	Goals	Apps	Goals	Apps	Goals
Valladolid B	2016–17	Segunda División B	13	0	—		—		—		0	0	13	0
Valladolid B	2017–18	Segunda División B	0	0	—		—		—		0	0	0	0
Valladolid B	Total		13	0	—		—		—		0	0	13	0
Lanús	2017–18	Primera División	0	0	0	0	—		0	0	0	0	0	0
Lanús	2018–19	Primera División	5	1	1	0	2	0	0	0	0	0	8	1
Lanús	2019–20	Primera División	0	0	0	0	0	0	0	0	0	0	0	0
Lanús	Total		5	1	1	0	2	0	0	0	0	0	8	1
Platense (loan)	2019–20	Primera B Nacional	3	0	1	0	—		—		0	0	4	0
Career total			21	1	2	0	2	0	0	0	0	0	25	1
