= Leonel Di Plácido =

Argentine footballer

Personal information
- Date of birth: 28 January 1994 (age 32)
- Place of birth: Buenos Aires, Argentina
- Height: 1.76 m (5 ft 9 in)
- Position: Right-back

Team information
- Current team: Atlético Tucumán
- Number: 24

Senior career*
Years	Team	Apps	(Gls)
2013–2017	All Boys	59	(2)
2016–2017	→ Atlético Tucumán (loan)	39	(0)
2017–2025	Lanús	104	(2)
2023	→ Botafogo (loan)	50	(1)
2024–2025	→ Sport (loan)	12	(0)
2026–	Atlético Tucumán	21	(0)
- * Club domestic league appearances and goals as of 17:39, 9 November 2026 (UTC)

Leonel Di Plácido (born 28 January 1994) is an Argentine professional footballer who plays as a right-back for Atlético Tucumán.

== Club career ==
Di Plácido started his professional career in Floresta, Buenos Aires with then-Primera División club All Boys in 2013, however his first appearance for the team came in 2014 in a league defeat against Newell's Old Boys. His first five appearances for All Boys were off the bench so he had to wait until 17 April to start a match, versus Arsenal de Sarandí, which ended with him scoring his first goal of his career, an 84th-minute equaliser assisted by Javier Cámpora. However, it was not a good season for All Boys as they suffered relegation into the Primera B Nacional.

In 2014, his second season with All Boys, he participated in fifteen matches over two competitions and scored his second goal; against Unión. 2015 turned out to be Di Plácido's most prominent and last season with the club as he played thirty-five times before departing to join Atlético Tucumán on loan until June 2017 in 2016. He made his debut for his new club on 19 February against Unión. On 24 August 2017, Di Plácido completed a permanent transfer to Lanús. He made his Lanús debut in a home defeat to Boca Juniors on 10 September.

== International career ==
Di Plácido was called up to the Argentina national team by Lionel Scaloni for friendlies in September 2018 with Guatemala and Colombia; though remained on the bench for both fixtures.

== Personal life ==
On 1 September 2020, it was confirmed that Di Plácido had tested positive for COVID-19 amid the pandemic; having shown symptoms a week prior.

== Career statistics ==
As of 21 March 2023.

Club statistics
Club	Season	League			Cup		League Cup		Continental		State League		Other		Total	
Club	Season	Division	Apps	Goals	Apps	Goals	Apps	Goals	Apps	Goals	Apps	Goals	Apps	Goals	Apps	Goals
All Boys	2013–14	Primera División	11	1	0	0	—		—		—		0	0	11	1
All Boys	2014	Primera B Nacional	14	1	1	0	—		—		—		0	0	15	1
All Boys	2015	Primera B Nacional	34	0	1	0	—		—		—		0	0	35	0
All Boys	2016	Primera B Nacional	0	0	0	0	—		—		—		0	0	0	0
All Boys	2016–17	Primera B Nacional	0	0	0	0	—		—		—		0	0	0	0
All Boys	Total		59	2	2	0	—		—		—		0	0	61	2
Atlético Tucumán (loan)	2016	Primera División	4	0	0	0	—		—		—		0	0	4	0
Atlético Tucumán (loan)	2016–17	Primera División	26	0	1	0	—		9 (Note: Appearance(s) in the Copa Libertadores)	0	—		0	0	36	0
Atlético Tucumán (loan)	Total		30	0	1	0	—		9	0	—		0	0	40	0
Lanús	2017–18	Primera División	6	0	0	0	—		0	0	—		0	0	6	0
Lanús	2018–19	Primera División	24	1	2	0	2	0	2 (Note: Appearance(s) in the Copa Sudamericana)	0	—		0	0	30	1
Lanús	2019–20	Primera División	21	0	4	0	0	0	1	0	—		0	0	26	0
Lanús	2020–21	Primera División	6 (Note: Soccerway counts Copa de la Liga Profesional appearances as league appearances.)	0	0	0	—		3	0	—		—		9	0
Lanús	2021	Primera División	4	0	0	0	—		0	0	—		—		4	0
Lanús	2022	Primera División	26	1	1	0	—		4	0	—		—		31	1
Lanús	2023	Primera División	2	0	0	0	—		—		—		—		2	0
Lanús	Total		89	2	7	0	2	0	10	0	—		0	0	108	2
Botafogo (loan)	2023	Série A	0	0	1	0	—		0	0	1 (Note: Appearance(s) in the Campeonato Carioca)	0	—		2	0
Career total			178	4	11	0	2	0	19	0	1	0	0	0	211	4
