= Sergio González (footballer, born 1995) =

Argentine footballer

Personal information
- Full name: Sergio Fabián González
- Date of birth: 5 April 1995 (age 31)
- Place of birth: Lamarque, Argentina
- Height: 1.69 m (5 ft 6 1/2 in)
- Position: Forward

Team information
- Current team: Racing Córdoba

Youth career
- Villa Mitre
- 2013–2015: Lanús

Senior career*
Years	Team	Apps	(Gls)
2015–2019	Lanús	22	(4)
2016–2017	→ Defensa y Justicia (loan)	3	(0)
2017–2018	→ San Martín (loan)	19	(4)
2018	→ Alki Oroklini (loan)	0	(0)
2019	→ Guillermo Brown (loan)	11	(3)
2019–2020	Independiente Rivadavia	20	(2)
2020–2021	Niki Volos	17	(0)
2021–2023	Guillermo Brown	39	(4)
2023–2024	Mushuc Runa	43	(8)
2024–2025	Técnico Universitario	29	(7)
2025–	Racing Córdoba	19	(4)
- * Club domestic league appearances and goals as of 17:12, 4 May 2026 (UTC)

Sergio Fabián González (born 5 April 1995) is an Argentine professional footballer who plays as a forward for Racing Córdoba.

== Career ==
González began in Villa Mitre's youth, before joining Lanús in January 2013. He was promoted into Lanús' first-team for the 2015 Argentine Primera División, he made thirty-three appearances and scored six goals in his first season; making his debut against Belgrano on 23 February, scoring his first goal versus Atlético de Rafaela on 11 July. He made one further appearance in the following season of 2016, prior to leaving Lanús on loan in October 2016 to join fellow Primera División team Defensa y Justicia. He made three appearances for Defensa y Justicia before returning to his parent club on 30 June 2017.

Ahead of 2017–18, González joined Primera B Nacional's San Martín on loan. He scored his first goal for San Martín on 28 October against Deportivo Morón. In July 2018, González was signed on loan by Cypriot side Alki Oroklini. However, he returned to his homeland soon after. Guillermo Brown became his fifth career club, his fourth on loan, in January 2019.

== Career statistics ==
As of 22 January 2019.

Club statistics
Club	Season	League			Cup		Continental		Other		Total	
Club	Season	Division	Apps	Goals	Apps	Goals	Apps	Goals	Apps	Goals	Apps	Goals
Lanús	2015	Primera División	21	4	5	2	4 (Note: Appearance(s) in the Copa Sudamericana)	0	3 (Note: Appearance(s) in the Primera División play-offs)	0	33	6
Lanús	2016	Primera División	1	0	0	0	—		0	0	1	0
Lanús	2016–17	Primera División	0	0	0	0	0	0	0	0	0	0
Lanús	2017–18	Primera División	0	0	0	0	0	0	0	0	0	0
Lanús	2018–19	Primera División	0	0	0	0	0	0	0	0	0	0
Lanús	Total		22	4	5	2	4	0	3	0	34	6
Defensa y Justicia (loan)	2016–17	Primera División	3	0	0	0	0	0	0	0	3	0
San Martín (loan)	2017–18	Primera B Nacional	19	4	0	0	—		5 (Note: Appearance(s) in the Primera B Nacional play-offs)	0	24	4
Alki Oroklini (loan)	2018–19	First Division	0	0	0	0	—		0	0	0	0
Guillermo Brown (loan)	2018–19	Primera B Nacional	0	0	0	0	—		0	0	0	0
Career total			44	8	5	2	4	0	8	0	61	10

== Honours ==
Lanús

- Argentine Primera División: 2016
