= Joel Martínez (footballer, born 1996) =

Argentine footballer

Personal information
- Full name: Denis Joel Martínez
- Date of birth: 10 April 1996 (age 30)
- Place of birth: Ezpeleta, Argentina
- Height: 1.78 m (5 ft 10 in)
- Position: Forward

Team information
- Current team: Gimnasia y Tiro (on loan from Brown de Adrogué)

Youth career
- Lanús

Senior career*
Years	Team	Apps	(Gls)
2016–2020	Lanús	2	(0)
2016–2017	→ Brown de Adrogué (loan)	14	(1)
2019–2020	→ Guillermo Brown (loan)	28	(3)
2020–	Brown de Adrogué	22	(0)
2022–	→ Gimnasia y Tiro (loan)	4	(1)
- * Club domestic league appearances and goals as of 20:02, 29 June 2022 (UTC)

Denis Joel Martínez (born 10 April 1996) is an Argentine professional footballer who plays as a forward for Gimnasia y Tiro, on loan from Brown de Adrogué.

== Career ==
Martínez began his career with Primera División side Lanús. He featured five times for the U20s at the 2016 U-20 Copa Libertadores in Paraguay, which preceded a loan spell to Primera B Nacional's Brown for the 2016–17 campaign. He made his professional debut on 28 October 2016 in a 2–1 loss against Estudiantes, prior to scoring his first senior goal in June 2017 versus Villa Dálmine. In total, Martínez played fourteen times and scored once for Brown. He returned to Lanús for the 2017–18 season and subsequently made his debut for the club on 11 December 2017 in a defeat away to Chacarita Juniors.

The opening goal of Martínez's Lanús career in July 2018 during a Copa Argentina win over Douglas Haig. Six months later, Martínez was loaned back to Primera B Nacional with Guillermo Brown. Three goals in twenty-eight matches followed across the next eighteen months there. In August 2020, Martínez left Lanús to rejoin Brown de Adrogué. In June 2022, Martínez was loaned out to Gimnasia y Tiro until the end of the year.

== Career statistics ==
As of 7 September 2020.

Club statistics
Club	Season	League			Cup		Continental		Other		Total	
Club	Season	Division	Apps	Goals	Apps	Goals	Apps	Goals	Apps	Goals	Apps	Goals
Lanús	2016–17	Primera División	0	0	0	0	0	0	0	0	0	0
Lanús	2017–18	Primera División	2	0	0	0	0	0	0	0	2	0
Lanús	2018–19	Primera División	0	0	1	1	1 (Note: Appearance(s) in the Copa Sudamericana)	0	0	0	2	1
Lanús	2019–20	Primera División	0	0	0	0	0	0	0	0	0	0
Lanús	Total		2	0	1	1	1	0	0	0	4	1
Brown (loan)	2016–17	Primera B Nacional	14	1	0	0	—		0	0	14	1
Guillermo Brown (loan)	2018–19	Primera B Nacional	12	2	0	0	—		0	0	12	2
Guillermo Brown (loan)	2019–20	Primera B Nacional	16	1	0	0	—		0	0	16	1
Guillermo Brown (loan)	Total		28	3	0	0	—		0	0	28	3
Brown (loan)	2020–21	Primera B Nacional	0	0	0	0	—		0	0	0	0
Career total			44	4	1	1	1	0	0	0	46	5
