= Darío Cáceres =

Paraguayan footballer (born 1998)

Personal information
- Full name: Jorge Darío Cáceres Ovelar
- Date of birth: 26 January 1998 (age 28)
- Place of birth: Pirayú, Paraguay
- Height: 1.78 m (5 ft 10 in)
- Position: Left-back

Team information
- Current team: Central Córdoba SdE
- Number: 23

Youth career
- San Lorenzo
- 2013–2018: Lanús

Senior career*
Years	Team	Apps	(Gls)
2018–2023	Lanús	6	(0)
2020	→ River Plate (loan)	3	(0)
2021	→ Alvarado (loan)	27	(1)
2022	→ Ferro Carril Oeste (loan)	28	(0)
2023–2026	Defensa y Justicia	53	(1)
2025	→ Nacional (loan)	27	(0)
2026–	Central Córdoba SdE	12	(0)
- * Club domestic league appearances and goals as of 17:24, 12 November 2026 (UTC)

Jorge Darío Cáceres Ovelar (born 26 January 1998) is a Paraguayan professional footballer who plays as a left-back for Central Córdoba SdE.

== Career ==
After arriving in Argentina from Paraguay with his father in 2008, Cáceres soon joined San Lorenzo's youth ranks which preceded Lanús signing him in 2013. Cáceres remained in their system for five years, notably featuring for the U20s at the 2016 U-20 Copa Libertadores, before being promoted into the Argentine Primera División club's first-team during the 2017–18 campaign. Having been an unused substitute versus Racing Club on 16 February 2018, Cáceres eventually made his professional debut a week later against Rosario Central. Three subsequent appearances followed.

On 3 January 2020, Cáceres returned to Paraguay and joined River Plate on a one-year loan with no option to buy. On 1 February 2021, he was then loaned out to Alvarado until the end of 2021. For the 2022 season, he was loaned out to Ferro Carril Oeste.

== Career statistics ==
As of 25 September 2018.

Club statistics
Club	Season	League			Cup (Note: Includes the Copa Argentina)		League Cup		Continental (Note: Includes the Copa Sudamericana)		Other		Total	
Club	Season	Division	Apps	Goals	Apps	Goals	Apps	Goals	Apps	Goals	Apps	Goals	Apps	Goals
Lanús	2017–18	Primera División	4	0	0	0	—		0	0	0	0	4	0
Lanús	2018–19	Primera División	0	0	0	0	—		—		0	0	0	0
Career total			4	0	0	0	—		0	0	0	0	4	0
