= Nahuel Tecilla =

Argentine footballer

Personal information
- Full name: Nahuel Ezequiel Tecilla
- Date of birth: 16 January 1995 (age 31)
- Place of birth: Buenos Aires, Argentina
- Height: 1.93 m (6 ft 4 in)
- Position: Centre-back

Team information
- Current team: Comerciantes Unidos

Senior career*
Years	Team	Apps	(Gls)
2013–2015	El Porvenir	59	(4)
2016–2019	Lanús	0	(0)
2017–2019	→ Atlanta (loan)	49	(1)
2019–2021	Atlanta	29	(3)
2021–2022	Belgrano	19	(0)
2022	→ Tristán Suárez (loan)	20	(1)
2023	Guillermo Brown	33	(1)
2024	CA Alvarado	10	(0)
2025–	Comerciantes Unidos	26	(0)
- * Club domestic league appearances and goals as of 30 December 2025

Nahuel Ezequiel Tecilla (born 16 January 1995) is an Argentine professional footballer who plays as a centre-back for Peruvian club Comerciantes Unidos.

== Career ==
Tecilla started his senior footballing career in Primera D with El Porvenir, he scored four goals in fifty-nine appearances for the club. 2016 saw Tecilla join Argentine Primera División side Lanús. A year later, in July 2017, Tecilla was loaned out to Primera B Metropolitana's Atlanta. He made his professional debut on 4 September 2017 during a goalless draw with Colegiales, however the match was later awarded as an Atlanta win following Colegiales fielding an ineligible player. In the reverse fixture later that season, Tecilla scored his first professional goal versus Colegiales in a draw on 27 January. They were promoted to tier two in 2018–19.

On 7 August 2019, Tecilla returned to Atlanta on a two-year contract.

== Career statistics ==
As of 7 August 2019.

Club statistics
Club	Season	League			Cup		League Cup		Continental		Other		Total	
Club	Season	Division	Apps	Goals	Apps	Goals	Apps	Goals	Apps	Goals	Apps	Goals	Apps	Goals
Lanús	2016	Primera División	0	0	0	0	—		—		0	0	0	0
Lanús	2016–17	Primera División	0	0	0	0	—		0	0	0	0	0	0
Lanús	2017–18	Primera División	0	0	0	0	—		0	0	0	0	0	0
Lanús	2018–19	Primera División	0	0	0	0	0	0	—		0	0	0	0
Lanús	Total		0	0	0	0	0	0	0	0	0	0	0	0
Atlanta (loan)	2017–18	Primera B Metropolitana	22	1	3	0	—		—		1 (Note: Appearance(s) Primera B Metropolitana play-offs)	0	26	1
Atlanta (loan)	2018–19	Primera B Metropolitana	27	0	0	0	—		—		0	0	27	0
Atlanta [[Belgrano]]	2019–20 2021-presente	Primera B Nacional	0	0	0	0	—		—		0	0	0	0
Atlanta [[Belgrano]]	Total		49	1	3	0	—		—		1	0	53	1
Career total			49	1	3	0	0	0	0	0	1	0	53	1
