= Leonardo Flores (footballer, born 1997) =

Argentine professional footballer

Personal information
- Full name: Leonardo Flores
- Date of birth: 17 May 1997 (age 29)
- Place of birth: Buenos Aires, Argentina
- Height: 1.69 m (5 ft 7 in)
- Position: Right-back

Team information
- Current team: Atlético Rafaela

Youth career
- Lanús

Senior career*
Years	Team	Apps	(Gls)
2018–2021	Lanús	2	(0)
2018–2019	→ Brown de Adrogué (loan)	3	(0)
2019–2021	→ Atlanta (loan)	24	(0)
2021–2024	Banfield	4	(0)
2022	→ Almirante Brown (loan)	19	(0)
2023	→ Estudiantes RC (loan)	19	(1)
2024–2026	Atlanta	32	(0)
2026–	Atlético Rafaela	1	(1)
- * Club domestic league appearances and goals as of 18:17, 27 March 2026 (UTC)

Leonardo Flores (born 17 May 1997) is an Argentine professional footballer who plays as a defender for Atlético Rafaela.

== Career ==
Flores began with Lanús. February 2018 saw the defender move into Ezequiel Carboni's first-team squad, subsequently making his professional debut on 24 February in a 1–1 draw at home to Rosario Central. One more appearance arrived on 11 March against Estudiantes, in a season (2017–18) which the club ended in 22nd. On 15 July 2018, Brown of Primera B Nacional completed the loan signing of Flores. From June 2019 to June 2021, he was on loan at Atlanta.

On 30 July 2021, Flores joined Banfield on a deal until the end of 2024. To get some more playing time, Flores was loaned out to Almirante Brown in January 2022 for the rest of the year, with a purchase option.

== Career statistics ==
As of 16 October 2018.

Club statistics
Club	Season	League			Cup (Note: Includes the Copa Argentina)		League Cup		Continental (Note: Includes the Copa Libertadores and Copa Sudamericana)		Other		Total	
Club	Season	Division	Apps	Goals	Apps	Goals	Apps	Goals	Apps	Goals	Apps	Goals	Apps	Goals
Lanús	2017–18	Primera División	2	0	0	0	—		0	0	0	0	2	0
Lanús	2018–19	Primera División	0	0	0	0	—		0	0	0	0	0	0
Lanús	Total		2	0	0	0	—		0	0	0	0	2	0
Brown (loan)	2018–19	Primera B Nacional	0	0	0	0	—		—		0	0	0	0
Career total			2	0	0	0	—		0	0	0	0	2	0
