= Gabriel Carrasco =

Argentine footballer

Personal information
- Full name: Gabriel Darío Carrasco
- Date of birth: 7 March 1997 (age 29)
- Place of birth: Banfield, Argentina
- Height: 1.75 m (5 ft 9 in)
- Position: Right-back

Team information
- Current team: Los Andes

Youth career
- Lanús

Senior career*
Years	Team	Apps	(Gls)
2017–2021	Lanús	40	(1)
2020	→ Godoy Cruz (loan)	8	(0)
2021	Santamarina	18	(0)
2021–2022	Atlanta	28	(0)
2023–	Los Andes	57	(5)
- * Club domestic league appearances and goals as of 17:36, 13 August 2025 (UTC)

Gabriel Darío Carrasco (born 7 March 1997) is an Argentine professional footballer who plays as a right-back for Los Andes.

== Career ==
=== Club ===
Carrasco joined Lanús as a youth player, he played once for the club versus São Paulo at the 2016 U-20 Copa Libertadores in Paraguay. He was promoted into Lanús' first-team during the 2016–17 Argentine Primera División season, making his debut during a 3–0 defeat away to Racing Club. In January 2018, Carrasco scored his first senior goal in a home draw against Patronato. On 16 December 2019 it was confirmed, that Carrasco had joined Godoy Cruz on loan with an option to buy.

In March 2021, Carrasco joined Santamarina. A few months later, at the end of July 2021, Carrasco moved to Atlanta, signing a deal until the end of 2022.

=== International ===
Carrasco was selected by the Argentina U20s for Claudio Úbeda's pre-2017 FIFA U-20 World Cup training squad, but he wasn't picked for the final tournament.

== Career statistics ==
As of 11 May 2018.

Club statistics
Club	Season	League			Cup (Note: Includes the Copa Argentina)		League Cup		Continental (Note: Includes the Copa Libertadores and Copa Sudamericana)		Other		Total	
Club	Season	Division	Apps	Goals	Apps	Goals	Apps	Goals	Apps	Goals	Apps	Goals	Apps	Goals
Lanús	2016–17	Primera División	5	0	1	0	—		0	0	0	0	6	0
Lanús	2017–18	Primera División	16	1	0	0	—		3 (Note: One appearance in 2017 Copa Libertadores, two appearances in 2018 Copa Sudamericana)	0	0	0	19	1
Career total			21	1	1	0	—		3	0	0	0	25	1
