= Gastón Lodico =

Argentine footballer

Personal information
- Full name: Gastón Andrés Lodico
- Date of birth: 28 May 1998 (age 28)
- Place of birth: Avellaneda, Argentina
- Height: 1.62 m (5 ft 4 in)
- Position: Midfielder

Team information
- Current team: Racing Club
- Number: 20

Youth career
- Racing Club
- 2008–2018: Lanús

Senior career*
Years	Team	Apps	(Gls)
2018–2024	Lanús	32	(2)
2020	→ Ferencváros (loan)	5	(0)
2021	→ Aldosivi (loan)	30	(4)
2022	→ O'Higgins (loan)	26	(1)
2023	→ Instituto (loan)	41	(1)
2024–2026	Instituto	88	(7)
2026–	Racing Club	11	(0)
- * Club domestic league appearances and goals as of 18:10, 8 November 2026 (UTC)

Gastón Andrés Lodico (born 28 May 1998) is an Argentine professional footballer who plays as a midfielder for Racing Club.

== Career ==
Lodico joined Lanús in 2008 from Racing Club. Originally he was with Lanús' U20s, representing them at the 2016 U-20 Copa Libertadores before moving into the senior squad in 2018. His professional debut arrived on 27 January against Patronato, he was selected for the full duration of a 1–1 home draw in the Argentine Primera División. In his eleventh appearance, Lodico scored his first goal during a league fixture away to San Martín. Overall, Lodico made sixteen appearances in his debut season of 2017–18.

=== Ferencváros ===
Lodico had a seven-month loan spell in Hungary with Ferencváros in 2020, winning the 2019–20 title.

On 16 June 2020, he became champion with Ferencváros by beating Budapest Honvéd FC at the Hidegkuti Nándor Stadion on the 30th match day of the 2019–20 Nemzeti Bajnokság I season.

=== Aldosivi ===
On 27 January 2022, Lodico joined Aldosivi on a one-year loan. He made a 30 appearances and scored four goals, during the year.

=== O'Higgins ===
On 15 February 2022, Lodico was once again loaned out, this time på Chilean club O'Higgins until the end of 2022.

== Personal life ==
Lodico is the nephew of former professional footballers Carlos Lodico and José Lodico.

== Career statistics ==
As of 13 April 2025.

Club statistics
Club	Division	League			Cup		Continental		Total	
Club	Division	Season	Apps	Goals	Apps	Goals	Apps	Goals	Apps	Goals
Lanús	Argentine Primera División	2017–18	14	1	—		2	0	16	1
Lanús	Argentine Primera División	2018–19	14	1	5	0	—		19	1
Lanús	Argentine Primera División	2019–20	4	0	—		—		4	0
Lanús	Argentine Primera División	2020-21	—		4	1	1	0	5	1
Lanús	Total		32	2	9	1	3	0	44	3
Ferencváros	Nemzeti Bajnokság I	2019–20	5	0	—		—		5	0
Aldosivi	Argentine Primera División	2021	21	4	9	0	—		30	4
O'Higgins	Chilean Primera División	2022	26	1	3	0	—		29	1
Instituto	Argentine Primera División	2023	27	1	16	0	—		43	1
Instituto	Argentine Primera División	2024	27	1	15	0	—		42	1
Instituto	Argentine Primera División	2025	12	3	1	0	—		13	3
Instituto	Total		66	5	32	0	0	0	98	5
Career total			150	12	53	1	3	0	206	13

== Honours ==
Ferencváros

- Nemzeti Bajnokság I: 2019–20
