= Pablo Martínez (Uruguayan footballer) =

Uruguayan footballer (born 1989)

Personal information
- Full name: Pablo Sergio Martínez da Rosa
- Date of birth: 8 March 1989 (age 37)
- Place of birth: Uruguay
- Position: Midfielder

Senior career*
Years	Team	Apps	(Gls)
2004–2007	La Luz	55	(1)
2009–2011	Cerrito	13	(0)
- * Club domestic league appearances and goals

Pablo Sergio Martínez da Rosa (born 8 March 1989) is a Uruguayan footballer who plays as a midfielder. He is currently a free agent.

== Career ==
Martínez spent the first three years of his career with La Luz, scoring one goal in fifty-five appearances for the Uruguayan Segunda División club. In 2009, Martínez joined Cerrito of the Uruguayan Primera División. He made his top-flight debut for the club on 9 December during a win away to Atenas. Five further appearances followed during 2009–10, a campaign which ended with relegation. Martínez remained for the next season, featuring seven more times as they won promotion back up. He subsequently departed.

== Career statistics ==
As of 16 October 2018.

Club statistics
Club	Season	League			Cup		League Cup		Continental		Other		Total	
Club	Season	Division	Apps	Goals	Apps	Goals	Apps	Goals	Apps	Goals	Apps	Goals	Apps	Goals
Cerrito	2009–10	Primera División	6	0	—		—		—		0	0	6	0
Cerrito	2010–11	Segunda División	7	0	—		—		—		0	0	7	0
Career total			13	0	—		—		—		0	0	13	0
