= Matías González (footballer, born 1997) =

Argentine footballer

Personal information
- Full name: Matías Leonel González
- Date of birth: 3 January 1997 (age 29)
- Place of birth: Ezeiza, Argentina
- Height: 1.84 m (6 ft 1/2 in)
- Position: Forward

Team information
- Current team: Peña Boquense

Youth career
- Lanús

Senior career*
Years	Team	Apps	(Gls)
2015–2019	Lanús	0	(0)
2016–2017	→ Chacarita Juniors (loan)	16	(0)
2018–2019	→ Los Andes (loan)	19	(1)
2020–	Peña Boquense	2	(0)
- * Club domestic league appearances and goals as of 00:51, 24 March 2020 (UTC)

Matías Leonel González (born 3 January 1997) is an Argentine professional footballer who plays as a forward for Peña Boquense.

== Career ==
González started his footballing career with Lanús. During the 2015 Argentine Primera División season, he appeared on the club's substitutes bench for games against Temperley and Atlético de Rafaela but was unused both times. In August 2016, González joined Primera B Nacional side Chacarita Juniors on loan. He made his debut on 27 August in a 1–1 draw versus Instituto. Overall, he made seventeen appearances in league and cup as Chacarita won promotion to the Argentine Primera División. González was loaned to Los Andes on 22 February 2018.

== Career statistics ==
As of 20 May 2018.

Club statistics
Club	Season	League			Cup (Note: Includes the Copa Argentina)		League Cup		Continental (Note: Includes the Copa Libertadores and Copa Sudamericana)		Other		Total	
Club	Season	Division	Apps	Goals	Apps	Goals	Apps	Goals	Apps	Goals	Apps	Goals	Apps	Goals
Lanús	2015	Primera División	0	0	0	0	—		0	0	0	0	0	0
Lanús	2016	Primera División	0	0	0	0	—		0	0	0	0	0	0
Lanús	2016–17	Primera División	0	0	0	0	—		0	0	0	0	0	0
Lanús	2017–18	Primera División	0	0	0	0	—		0	0	0	0	0	0
Lanús	Total		0	0	0	0	—		0	0	0	0	0	0
Chacarita Juniors (loan)	2016–17	Primera B Nacional	16	0	1	0	—		—		0	0	17	0
Los Andes (loan)	2017–18	Primera B Nacional	7	0	0	0	—		—		0	0	7	0
Career total			23	0	1	0	—		0	0	0	0	24	0
