= Gabriel Ramírez (footballer, born 1995) =

Argentine footballer

Personal information
- Full name: Gabriel Omar Ramírez
- Date of birth: 29 June 1995 (age 31)
- Place of birth: Corrientes, Argentina
- Height: 1.76 m (5 ft 9 1/2 in)
- Position: Midfielder

Team information
- Current team: Chaco For Ever

Youth career
- Lanús
- 2015: Talleres
- 2016: Lanús

Senior career*
Years	Team	Apps	(Gls)
2016–2019	Lanús	0	(0)
2016–2017	→ Quilmes (loan)	20	(1)
2017	→ Talleres (loan)	6	(0)
2018	→ Quilmes (loan)	11	(0)
2018–2019	→ Atlético de Rafaela (loan)	15	(0)
2019–2020	Quilmes	32	(1)
2020–2021	Boca Unidos	1	(1)
2021–2022	Atlético Atlanta	26	(0)
2022–2023	AEL	17	(1)
2023–2024	Mitre	28	(0)
2024–2025	San Telmo	39	(2)
2025–2026	Ferro Carril Oeste	15	(0)
2026–	Chaco For Ever	5	(1)
- * Club domestic league appearances and goals as of 16:38, 25 April 2026 (UTC)

Gabriel Omar Ramírez (born 29 June 1995) is an Argentine professional footballer who plays as a midfielder for Chaco For Ever.

== Career ==
Ramírez started in the youth ranks of Lanús, which preceded a short spell in 2015 with Talleres' academy prior to rejoining Lanús. He scored two goals in five games for the Lanús U20s at the 2016 U-20 Copa Libertadores. In July 2016, Ramírez was loaned to fellow Argentine Primera División side Quilmes. He made his professional debut on 17 September during a 1–1 draw with Independiente. In the following December, he scored the first two goals of his senior career in league matches against Sarmiento and Temperley. In total, Ramírez featured twenty-two times for Quilmes. He returned to Lanús in 2017.

He was again loaned out two months later to rejoin Talleres. Six appearances followed prior to his departure in December. In January 2018, Ramírez rejoined Quilmes, now of Primera B Nacional, on loan. His first appearance of 2017–18 arrived in a tie versus Agropecuario on 5 February. Atlético de Rafaela signed Ramírez on a loan deal in the following July.

== Career statistics ==
As of 11 September 2018.

Club statistics
Club	Season	League			Cup (Note: Includes the Copa Argentina)		League Cup		Continental (Note: Includes the Copa Libertadores and Copa Sudamericana)		Other		Total	
Club	Season	Division	Apps	Goals	Apps	Goals	Apps	Goals	Apps	Goals	Apps	Goals	Apps	Goals
Lanús	2016–17	Primera División	0	0	0	0	—		0	0	0	0	0	0
Lanús	2017–18	Primera División	0	0	0	0	—		0	0	0	0	0	0
Lanús	2018–19	Primera División	0	0	0	0	—		0	0	0	0	0	0
Lanús	Total		0	0	0	0	—		0	0	0	0	0	0
Quilmes (loan)	2016–17	Primera División	22	2	2	0	—		—		0	0	24	2
Talleres (loan)	2017–18	Primera División	6	0	0	0	—		—		0	0	6	0
Quilmes (loan)	2017–18	Primera B Nacional	11	0	0	0	—		—		0	0	11	0
Atlético de Rafaela (loan)	2018–19	Primera B Nacional	2	0	0	0	—		—		0	0	2	0
Career total			41	2	2	0	—		0	0	0	0	43	2
