= Gabriel Ramírez (footballer, born 1982) =

Uruguayan footballer

Personal information
- Full name: Gabriel Ramírez Rodríguez
- Date of birth: 21 December 1982 (age 43)
- Place of birth: Melo, Uruguay
- Height: 1.85 m (6 ft 1 in)
- Position: Forward

Senior career*
Years	Team	Apps	(Gls)
2003–2007	Cerro Largo	65	(9)
2009	Cerro Largo	5	(0)
- * Club domestic league appearances and goals as of 05:55, 19 March 2018 (UTC)

Gabriel Ramírez Rodríguez (born 21 December 1982) is a Uruguayan footballer who plays as a forward. He is currently a free agent.

== Career ==
Ramírez joined Uruguayan Segunda División side Cerro Largo in 2003 and went on to make sixty-five appearances and scored nine goals in the following four years, he left the club in 2007 but returned two years later with Cerro Largo now playing in the Uruguayan Primera División. His first match back came during a home defeat to Cerrito, which was the first of five appearances during the 2009–10 season for Cerro Largo.
