= Pablo Martínez (Paraguayan footballer) =

Paraguayan footballer (born 1996)

Personal information
- Full name: Pablo Martínez Morales
- Date of birth: 30 November 1996 (age 29)
- Place of birth: Asunción, Paraguay
- Height: 1.75 m (5 ft 9 in)
- Position: Forward

Youth career
- Nanawa
- 2013–2018: 3 de Febrero

Senior career*
Years	Team	Apps	(Gls)
2018–2021	3 de Febrero	6	(0)
2018–2020	→ Lanús (loan)	8	(0)
2020	→ San Lorenzo (loan)	4	(0)
2021	→ Atlanta (loan)	7	(0)
- * Club domestic league appearances and goals as of 19:06, 13 April 2022 (UTC)

Pablo Martínez Morales (born 30 November 1996) is a Paraguayan professional footballer who plays as a forward.

== Career ==
Martínez spent part of his youth career with Nanawa, which preceded a move to 3 de Febrero in 2013. He was moved into their senior squad ahead of the 2018 Paraguayan Primera División season, making his professional bow during a 1–1 draw at home to Cerro Porteño. After making five more appearances for 3 de Febrero in 2018, Martínez left in June after being signed on loan by Argentine Primera División side Lanús.

== Career statistics ==
As of 16 October 2018.

Club statistics
Club	Season	League			Cup (Note: Includes the Copa Paraguay and Copa Argentina)		League Cup		Continental (Note: Includes the Copa Sudamericana)		Other		Total	
Club	Season	Division	Apps	Goals	Apps	Goals	Apps	Goals	Apps	Goals	Apps	Goals	Apps	Goals
3 de Febrero	2018	Paraguayan Primera División	6	0	0	0	—		—		0	0	6	0
Lanús (loan)	2018–19	Argentine Primera División	0	0	0	0	—		0	0	0	0	0	0
Career total			6	0	0	0	—		0	0	0	0	6	0
