= Marcos Pinto =

Argentine footballer

Personal information
- Full name: Marcos Ariel Pinto
- Date of birth: January 25, 1994 (age 32)
- Place of birth: Formosa, Argentina
- Height: 1.73 m (5 ft 8 in)
- Position: Left back

Team information
- Current team: Almagro

Youth career
- Lanús

Senior career*
Years	Team	Apps	(Gls)
2014–2019	Lanús	3	(0)
2015	→ San Martín (SJ) (loan)	7	(0)
2017–2018	→ Temperley (loan)	15	(0)
2019–2020	Barracas Central	9	(0)
2020–2022	Panserraikos	36	(0)
2022	Rentistas	14	(0)
2023	Atlanta	21	(0)
2024	Guillermo Brown	28	(0)
2025–	Almagro	11	(0)
- * Club domestic league appearances and goals as of 18:44, 28 June 2025 (UTC)

Marcos Ariel Pinto (born 25 January 1994) is an Argentine professional footballer who plays as a left back for Almagro.

== Career ==
=== Barracas Central ===
In the summer 2019, Pinto joined Primera B Nacional club Barracas Central. He left the club by the end of his contract in the summer 2020.
