= Fernando Barrientos =

Argentine footballer

Personal information
- Full name: Fernando Omar Barrientos
- Date of birth: 17 November 1991 (age 34)
- Place of birth: Lanús, Argentina
- Height: 1.74 m (5 ft 9 in)
- Position: Midfielder

Team information
- Current team: Valletta
- Number: 8

Youth career
- Lanús

Senior career*
Years	Team	Apps	(Gls)
2011–2020	Lanús	69	(3)
2012–2013	→ Villarreal B (loan)	4	(0)
2014–2015	→ Rosario Central (loan)	30	(1)
2015–2016	→ Atlético Paranaense (loan)	8	(0)
2019	→ Defensa y Justicia (loan)	5	(0)
2019–2020	→ Guaraní (loan)	36	(1)
2021	Cobreloa	26	(4)
2022	All Boys	24	(0)
2023	Gimnasia de Jujuy	5	(0)
2023–	Valletta	20	(0)
- * Club domestic league appearances and goals as of 13 May 2024

Fernando Omar Barrientos (born 17 November 1991) is an Argentine footballer who plays for Valletta as a midfielder.

== Honours ==
Lanús

- Copa Sudamericana: 2013

Atletico Paranaense

- Copa Paranaense: 2016
