= Marcos Astina =

Argentine footballer

Personal information
- Full name: Marcos Emanuel Astina
- Date of birth: 21 January 1996 (age 30)
- Place of birth: Buenos Aires, Argentina
- Height: 1.70 m (5 ft 7 in)
- Positions: Attacking midfielder; winger

Team information
- Current team: Borneo Samarinda
- Number: 7

Youth career
- –2013: Lanús

Senior career*
Years	Team	Apps	(Gls)
2013–2020	Lanús	17	(2)
2016–2017	→ Sarmiento (loan)	9	(1)
2017–2019	→ Atlético San Luis (loan)	23	(2)
2019	→ Atlanta (loan)	5	(0)
2020–2022	Alvarado	62	(10)
2023–2024	Chacarita Juniors	28	(1)
2025	San Telmo	26	(4)
2026–	Borneo Samarinda	14	(2)

International career
2013	Argentina U-17	13	(1)
- * Club domestic league appearances and goals as of 5 May 2026

Marcos Emanuel Astina (born 21 January 1996) is an Argentine footballer who plays as an attacking midfielder or winger for Super League club Borneo Samarinda.

== Club career ==
Born in Buenos Aires, Argentina, Astina is a product from Lanús, On 1 December 2013, he scored his first league goal in his debut match for Lanús against Boca Juniors in a 2–2 draw. In 2014, Astina also made his international debut, playing two matches for Lanús in the Copa Libertadores.

To gain more playing time, he was loaned to Sarmiento, where he was coached by Gabriel Schürrer. The following year, he played in Mexico's second division for Atlético San Luis, the club that earned him promotion after defeating Dorados de Sinaloa in two finals.

On 22 June 2019, Astina signed a contract with Atlanta. He played in five matches for the club, one of which was at the Estadio José María Minella, coming on as a substitute in the 82nd minute against Alvarado in Atlanta's 2–1 victory. In August 2020, Alvarado announced an agreement to sign Astina.
