= Matías Ibáñez =

Argentine footballer

Personal information
- Full name: Matías Alejandro Ibáñez Basualdo
- Date of birth: 16 December 1986 (age 39)
- Place of birth: Ciudad Evita, Argentina
- Height: 1.90 m (6 ft 3 in)
- Position: Goalkeeper

Team information
- Current team: Olimpo

Youth career
- Vélez Sarsfield

Senior career*
Years	Team	Apps	(Gls)
2007–2014	Olimpo	67	(0)
2012–2013	→ San Lorenzo (loan)	10	(0)
2014	Eibar	0	(0)
2014–2020	Lanús	39	(0)
2016–2017	→ Temperley (loan)	25	(0)
2019–2020	→ Patronato (loan)	23	(0)
2020	Racing Club	5	(0)
2021	Patronato	36	(1)
2022–2023	Colón	6	(0)
2024	Unión La Calera	19	(0)
2025–	Olimpo	14	(0)
- * Club domestic league appearances and goals as of 16:00, 21 June 2025 (UTC)

Matías Alejandro Ibáñez Basualdo (born 16 December 1986) is an Argentine footballer who plays for Olimpo as a goalkeeper.

== Club career ==
Born in Buenos Aires, Ibáñez graduated from local Vélez Sarsfield, but made his senior debuts with neighbouring Olimpo. With the side he achieved promotion back to Primera División in the 2009–10 season, as champions.

On 31 July 2012 Ibáñez moved to San Lorenzo in a season-long loan. Initially as a backup for Pablo Migliore, he managed to appear ten times for Ciclón.

On 11 February 2014 free agent Ibáñez joined Spanish Segunda División side SD Eibar. On 20 June, after making no appearances for the Armeros, he signed a two-and-a-half-year contract with Lanús.

In 2024, he moved to Chile and joined Unión La Calera from Colón.
