= Elías Gómez (footballer, born 1986) =

Argentine footballer

Personal information
- Full name: Sebastián Elías Gómez
- Date of birth: September 13, 1986 (age 40)
- Place of birth: Buenos Aires, Argentina
- Position: Goalkeeper

Team information
- Current team: Berazategui

Senior career*
Years	Team	Apps	(Gls)
2004–2007	Huracán	3	(0)
2007–2009	Tristán Suárez	19	(0)
2009–2017	Barracas Central	280	(5)
2017–2018	Talleres Remedios	34	(0)
2018–2020	Barracas Central	58	(1)
2020–	Berazategui	0	(0)
- * Club domestic league appearances and goals as of 22:39, 23 September 2020 (UTC)

Sebastián Elías Gómez (born September 13, 1986, in Buenos Aires) is an Argentine football goalkeeper. He currently plays for Berazategui.
