= Rolando García Guerreño =

Paraguayan footballer (born 1990)

Rolando García
Personal information
- Full name: Rolando García Guerreño
- Date of birth: 10 February 1990 (age 36)
- Place of birth: San Estanislao, Paraguay
- Height: 1.85 m (6 ft 1 in)
- Position: Centre-back

Team information
- Current team: Nacional
- Number: 5

Senior career*
Years	Team	Apps	(Gls)
2006–2010	2 de Mayo	55	(3)
2010–2013	Defensa y Justicia	87	(5)
2013–2014	Lobos BUAP	21	(2)
2014	Godoy Cruz	15	(1)
2015–2017	Unión Santa Fe	52	(2)
2017–2019	Lanús	46	(0)
2020	Guaraní	13	(0)
2021	Patronato	29	(0)
2022–	Nacional	6	(0)

International career
2009	Paraguay U20	1	(0)
2018–	Paraguay	0	(0)
- * Club domestic league appearances and goals as of 20:48, 15 April 2022 (UTC)

Rolando García Guerreño (born 10 February 1990 in Asunción, Paraguay) is a Paraguayan footballer currently playing for Club Nacional.

== Career ==
=== Club ===
Rolando García started his career in 2009 with Paraguayan club 2 de Mayo, his stay with the club was short as he left a year later to join Primera B Nacional team Defensa y Justicia; his debut for Defensa y Justicia came on 6 February 2010 against San Martín de Tucumán. It wasn't until the 2011–12 season that García scored his first goal for the club, in a 3–0 home win over Chacarita Juniors in August 2011. In his following and final season with the club, 2012–13, he scored 4 goals in 32 appearances as they finished sixth. He departed Defensa y Justicia in 2013 and subsequently joined Ascenso MX club Lobos BUAP. He remained with the Mexicans for one season before leaving as he made 21 league appearances and scored two goals.

Godoy Cruz became his fourth club in 2014 but, after four months and 15 games/1 goal, García left to join another Argentine team, Unión Santa Fe. His first match for his latest team came on 15 February 2015 against Huracán.

=== International ===
García has represented Paraguay once at international level, with his only cap so far coming with the Paraguay U20s when he was called up for the 2009 FIFA U-20 World Cup and played once; versus South Korea U20s.

== Career statistics ==
As of 31 May 2025

Appearances and goals by club, season and competition
Club	Division	League			Cup		Continental		Total	
Club	Division	Season	Apps	Goals	Apps	Goals	Apps	Goals	Apps	Goals
2 de Mayo	Paraguayan Primera División	2008	?	?	—		—		?	?
2 de Mayo	Paraguayan Primera División	2009	?	?	—		—		?	?
2 de Mayo	Total		55	3	—		—		55	3
Defensa y Justicia	Primera B Nacional	2009-10	8	0	—		—		8	0
Defensa y Justicia	Primera B Nacional	2010-11	20	0	—		—		20	0
Defensa y Justicia	Primera B Nacional	2011-12	26	1	0	0	—		26	1
Defensa y Justicia	Primera B Nacional	2012-13	32	4	1	0	—		33	4
Defensa y Justicia	Total		86	5	1	0	—		87	5
Lobos BUAP	Ascenso MX	2013-14	21	2	3	0	—		24	2
Godoy Cruz	Argentine Primera División	2014	15	1	—		1	0	16	1
Unión Santa Fe	Argentine Primera División	2015	26	1	2	0	—		28	1
Unión Santa Fe	Argentine Primera División	2016	13	1	1	0	—		14	1
Unión Santa Fe	Argentine Primera División	2016-17	13	0	3	0	—		16	0
Unión Santa Fe	Total		52	2	6	0	—		58	2
Lanús	Argentine Primera División	2016-17	9	0	1	0	3	0	13	0
Lanús	Argentine Primera División	2017-18	17	0	0	0	9	1	26	1
Lanús	Argentine Primera División	2018-19	20	0	6	1	2	1	28	2
Lanús	Argentine Primera División	2019-20	0	0	0	0	—		0	0
Lanús	Total		46	0	7	1	14	2	67	3
Guaraní	Paraguayan Primera División	2020	13	0	—		5	0	18	0
Patronato	Argentine Primera División	2021	19	0	12	0	—		31	0
Nacional	Paraguayan Primera División	2022	33	2	3	0	1	0	37	2
Sol de América	Paraguayan División Intermedia	2023	22	0	0	0	—		22	0
Sol de América	Paraguayan Primera División	2024	30	3	—		—		30	3
Sol de América	Total		52	3	0	0	—		52	3
Atlético Tembetary	Paraguayan Primera División	2025	10	0	—		—		10	0
Career total			402	18	32	1	21	2	455	21
