= Facundo Monteseirín =

Argentine footballer

Personal information
- Full name: Facundo Daniel Monteseirín
- Date of birth: 12 March 1995 (age 31)
- Place of birth: Cutral Có, Argentina
- Height: 1.85 m (6 ft 1 in)
- Position: Centre-back

Team information
- Current team: Unión San Felipe

Youth career
- –2013: Lanús

Senior career*
Years	Team	Apps	(Gls)
2013–2019	Lanús	26	(0)
2017–2018	→ Arsenal de Sarandí (loan)	25	(1)
2019–2020	San Martín SJ	17	(3)
2020–2021	Tigre	1	(0)
2022–2023	Nueva Chicago	13	(0)
2023	Chaco For Ever	9	(0)
2024–	Unión San Felipe	0	(0)

International career
2015	Argentina U-20	10	(1)
- * Club domestic league appearances and goals as of 7 June 2024

Facundo Daniel Monteseirín (born 12 March 1995) is an Argentine professional footballer who plays as a centre-back for Unión San Felipe in the Primera B de Chile.

== Career ==
In June 2024, Monteseirín moved to Chile and signed with Unión San Felipe in the Primera B.

== Honours ==
=== Club ===
Lanús

- Copa Sudamericana: 2013

Argentina U20

- South American Youth Football Championship: 2015
