= 2018–19 Superliga Argentina =

129th season of top-tier football league in Argentina

Superliga Argentina
- Season: 2018–19
- Dates: 10 August 2018 – 7 April 2019
- Champions: Racing (18th title)
- Relegated: Tigre; San Martín (SJ); Belgrano; San Martín (T)
- Copa Libertadores: Racing; Defensa y Justicia; Boca Juniors; Atlético Tucumán; River Plate (via Copa Argentina); Tigre (via Copa de la Superliga)
- Copa Sudamericana: Vélez Sarsfield; Independiente; Unión; Huracán; Lanús; Argentinos Juniors (via Copa de la Superliga)
- Matches: 325
- Goals: 719 (2.21 per match)
- Top goalscorer: Lisandro López (17 goals)
- Biggest home win: Independiente 4–0 San Martín (T) (Nov. 7, 2018); Vélez Sarsfield 4–0 Lanús (Apr. 6, 2019)
- Biggest away win: Lanús 1–5 River Plate (Sep. 28, 2018); Rosario Central 0–4 Unión (Oct. 7, 2018); Godoy Cruz 0–4 River Plate (Jan. 30, 2019); San Martín (SJ) 0–4 Boca Juniors (Jan. 31, 2019)
- Highest scoring: Tigre 4–4 Banfield (Feb. 8, 2019)
- Longest winning run: Boca Juniors and Racing; 6 games
- Longest unbeaten run: Defensa y Justicia; 19 games
- Longest winless run: San Lorenzo; 13 games
- Longest losing run: Argentinos Juniors, Huracán, Lanús and Patronato; 5 games

The 2018–19 Superliga Argentina (officially the Superliga Quilmes Clásica for sponsorship reasons) was the 129th season of top-flight professional football in Argentina. The season began on 10 August 2018 and ended on 7 April 2019. Boca Juniors were the defending champions.

Twenty-six teams competed in the league, twenty-four returning from the 2017–18 season and two promoted from the 2017–18 Primera B Nacional (Aldosivi and San Martín (T)). Four teams (Temperley, Olimpo, Arsenal, and Chacarita Juniors) were relegated to the Primera B Nacional championship in the previous tournament.

Racing won their eighteenth national league championship with one match to spare after a 1–1 draw against Tigre on 31 March 2019.

== Competition format ==
The tournament was contested by 26 teams. It began on 10 August 2018 and ended on 7 April 2019. Each team played the other 25 teams in a single round-robin tournament. The additional match against the main rival team in the so-called "Fecha de Clásicos" was once again omitted in this season. From 14 April to 2 June 2019, the Primera División played a new competition named "Copa de la Superliga".

== Club information ==
=== Stadia and locations ===
Locations of the 2018–19 Argentine Primera División teams outside Greater Buenos Aires.
Locations of the 2018–19 Argentine Primera División teams within Greater Buenos Aires.

| Club | City | Stadium | Capacity |
|---|---|---|---|
| Aldosivi | Mar del Plata | José María Minella | 35,354 |
| Argentinos Juniors | Buenos Aires | Diego Armando Maradona | 25,000 |
| Atlético Tucumán | Tucumán | Monumental José Fierro | 32,700 |
| Banfield | Banfield | Florencio Sola | 34,901 |
| Belgrano | Córdoba | Julio César Villagra | 28,000 |
| Belgrano | Córdoba | Mario Alberto Kempes | 57,000 |
| Boca Juniors | Buenos Aires | Alberto J. Armando | 49,000 |
| Colón | Santa Fe | Brigadier General Estanislao López | 40,000 |
| Defensa y Justicia | Florencio Varela | Norberto "Tito" Tomaghello | 12,000 |
| Estudiantes (LP) | La Plata | Ciudad de La Plata | 53,000 |
| Gimnasia y Esgrima (LP) | La Plata | Juan Carmelo Zerillo | 24,544 |
| Godoy Cruz | Godoy Cruz | Malvinas Argentinas | 40,268 |
| Huracán | Buenos Aires | Tomás Adolfo Ducó | 48,314 |
| Independiente | Avellaneda | Libertadores de América | 52,853 |
| Lanús | Lanús | Ciudad de Lanús - Néstor Díaz Pérez | 46,619 |
| Newell's Old Boys | Rosario | Marcelo Bielsa | 38,095 |
| Patronato | Paraná | Presbítero Bartolomé Grella | 22,000 |
| Racing | Avellaneda | Presidente Perón | 55,389 |
| River Plate | Buenos Aires | Monumental Antonio Vespucio Liberti | 61,321 |
| Rosario Central | Rosario | Dr. Lisandro de la Torre | 41,654 |
| San Lorenzo | Buenos Aires | Pedro Bidegain | 39,494 |
| San Martín (SJ) | San Juan | Ingeniero Hilario Sánchez | 19,000 |
| San Martín (SJ) | San Juan | Estadio del Bicentenario | 25,286 |
| San Martín (T) | Tucumán | La Ciudadela | 28,000 |
| Talleres (C) | Córdoba | Mario Alberto Kempes | 57,000 |
| Tigre | Victoria | José Dellagiovanna | 26,282 |
| Unión | Santa Fe | 15 de Abril | 22,852 |
| Vélez Sarsfield | Buenos Aires | José Amalfitani | 45,540 |

=== Personnel ===
| Club | Manager | Kit manufacturer | Main sponsor |
|---|---|---|---|
| Aldosivi | (Argentina) Gustavo Álvarez | Kappa | None |
| Argentinos Juniors | (Argentina) Diego Dabove | Reusch | Autocrédito |
| Atlético Tucumán | (Argentina) Ricardo Zielinski | Umbro | Secco |
| Banfield | (Argentina) Hernán Crespo | Hummel | Seguros Orbis |
| Belgrano | (Argentina) Diego Osella | Kappa | Tersuave |
| Boca Juniors | (Argentina) Gustavo Alfaro | Nike | Qatar Airways |
| Colón | (Argentina) Pablo Lavallén | Burrda Sport | PROF Grupo Asegurador |
| Defensa y Justicia | (Argentina) Sebastián Beccacece | Lyon | Planes ESCO |
| Estudiantes (LP) | (Argentina) Gabriel Milito | Umbro | DirecTV Sports |
| Gimnasia y Esgrima (LP) | (Argentina) Darío Ortiz | Le Coq Sportif | Escudo Seguros |
| Godoy Cruz | (Argentina) Lucas Bernardi | Kelme | CATA Internacional |
| Huracán | (Argentina) Antonio Mohamed | TBS | Banco Ciudad |
| Independiente | (Argentina) Ariel Holan | Puma | Caminos Protegidos Comapañía de Seguros |
| Lanús | (Argentina) Luis Zubeldía | Macron / Peak | Yamaha |
| Newell's Old Boys | (Venezuela) Héctor Bidoglio | Umbro | Grupo Márquez |
| Patronato | (Argentina) Mario Sciacqua | Lyon | Banco Entre Ríos |
| Racing | (Argentina) Eduardo Coudet | Kappa | RCA |
| River Plate | (Argentina) Marcelo Gallardo | Adidas | None |
| Rosario Central | (Argentina) Diego Cocca | Nike | TCL |
| San Lorenzo | (Argentina) Jorge Almirón | Nike | Banco Ciudad |
| San Martín (SJ) | (Argentina) Rubén Forestello | Mitre | San Juan |
| San Martín (T) | (Argentina) Ricardo Caruso Lombardi | KDY | Secco |
| Talleres (C) | (Argentina) Juan Pablo Vojvoda | Penalty | BBVA |
| Tigre | (Argentina) Néstor Gorosito | Joma | Banco Macro |
| Unión | (Argentina) Leonardo Madelón | TBS | OSPAT |
| Vélez Sarsfield | (Argentina) Gabriel Heinze | Kappa | Hitachi |

=== Managerial changes ===
| Team | Outgoing manager | Manner of departure | Date of vacancy | Position in table | Replaced by | Date of appointment |
|---|---|---|---|---|---|---|
| Belgrano | (Argentina) Pablo Lavallén | Resigned | 12 May 2018 | Pre-season | (Argentina) Lucas Bernardi ^{1} | 31 May 2018 |
| Gimnasia y Esgrima (LP) | (Argentina) Darío Ortiz | Replaced | 14 May 2018 | Pre-season | (Argentina) Pedro Troglio | 15 May 2018 |
| Rosario Central | (Argentina) José Chamot | Replaced | 14 May 2018 | Pre-season | (Argentina) Edgardo Bauza | 17 May 2018 |
| Talleres (C) | (Argentina) Frank Darío Kudelka | End of contract | 19 May 2018 | Pre-season | (Argentina) Juan Pablo Vojvoda | 30 May 2018 |
| Defensa y Justicia | (Argentina) Juan Pablo Vojvoda | Signed by Talleres (C) | 28 May 2018 | Pre-season | (Argentina) Sebastián Beccacece | 6 July 2018 |
| Lanús | (Argentina) Ezequiel Carboni | Resigned | 26 August 2018 | 19th | (Argentina) Luis Zubeldía ^{2} | 31 August 2018 |
| Patronato | (Argentina) Juan Pablo Pumpido | Resigned | 16 September 2018 | 26th | (Argentina) Mario Sciacqua ^{3} | 23 September 2018 |
| Argentinos Juniors | (Argentina) Alfredo Berti | Resigned | 16 September 2018 | 18th | (Argentina) Ezequiel Carboni | 18 September 2018 |
| San Martín (T) | (Argentina) Rubén Forestello | Sacked | 17 September 2018 | 23rd | (Argentina) Walter Coyette ^{4} | 25 September 2018 |
| San Martín (SJ) | (Argentina) Walter Coyette | Sacked | 23 September 2018 | 22nd | (Argentina) Rubén Forestello | 25 September 2018 |
| Tigre | (Argentina) Cristian Ledesma | Sacked | 24 September 2018 | 20th | (Argentina) Mariano Echeverría ^{5} | 3 October 2018 |
| Belgrano | (Argentina) Lucas Bernardi | Sacked | 9 October 2018 | 20th | (Argentina) Diego Osella | 11 October 2018 |
| San Lorenzo | (Argentina) Claudio Biaggio | Resigned | 31 October 2018 | 20th | (Argentina) Jorge Almirón ^{6} | 5 November 2018 |
| Colón | (Argentina) Eduardo Domínguez | Resigned | 11 November 2018 | 15th | (Uruguay) Julio Comesaña ^{7} | 20 December 2018 |
| Argentinos Juniors | (Argentina) Ezequiel Carboni | Mutual agreement | 12 November 2018 | 26th | (Argentina) Diego Dabove ^{8} | 14 December 2018 |
| Newell's Old Boys | (Argentina) Omar De Felippe | Resigned | 25 November 2018 | 20th | (Venezuela) Héctor Bidoglio ^{9} | 26 November 2018 |
| Banfield | (Argentina) Julio César Falcioni | End of contract | 8 December 2018 | 9th | (Argentina) Hernán Crespo | 14 December 2018 |
| Godoy Cruz | (Argentina) Diego Dabove | End of contract | 8 December 2018 | 8th | (Argentina) Marcelo Gómez | 28 December 2018 |
| Boca Juniors | (Argentina) Guillermo Barros Schelotto | End of contract | 9 December 2018 | 5th | (Argentina) Gustavo Alfaro | 21 December 2018 |
| Huracán | (Argentina) Gustavo Alfaro | Signed by Boca Juniors | 21 December 2018 | 4th | (Argentina) Antonio Mohamed | 27 December 2018 |
| Tigre | (Argentina) Mariano Echeverría | Resigned | 11 February 2019 | 19th | (Argentina) Néstor Gorosito | 12 February 2019 |
| San Martín (T) | (Argentina) Walter Coyette | Mutual agreement | 16 February 2019 | 21st | (Argentina) Ricardo Caruso Lombardi ^{10} | 26 February 2019 |
| Gimnasia y Esgrima (LP) | (Argentina) Pedro Troglio | Sacked | 17 February 2019 | 22nd | (Argentina) Darío Ortiz | 18 February 2019 |
| Rosario Central | (Argentina) Edgardo Bauza | Sacked | 23 February 2019 | 18th | (Argentina) Paulo Ferrari | 24 February 2019 |
| Godoy Cruz | (Argentina) Marcelo Gómez | Sacked | 24 February 2019 | 14th | (Argentina) Lucas Bernardi ^{11} | 2 March 2019 |
| Estudiantes (LP) | (Argentina) Leandro Benítez | Resigned | 24 February 2019 | 17th | (Argentina) Gabriel Milito ^{12} | 12 March 2019 |
| Colón | (Uruguay) Julio Comesaña | Resigned | 6 March 2019 | 21st | (Argentina) Pablo Lavallén ^{13} | 11 March 2019 |
| Rosario Central | (Argentina) Paulo Ferrari | Sacked | 17 March 2019 | 20th | (Argentina) Diego Cocca | 18 March 2019 |

Interim managers

1. Darío Cavallo was interim manager in the 2017–18 Copa Argentina round of 64.
2. (Argentina) Rodrigo Acosta was interim manager in the 4th round.
3. (Argentina) Martín De León was interim manager in the 6th round.
4. (Argentina) Ariel Martos was interim manager in the 6th round.
5. (Argentina) Juan Carlos Blengio was interim manager in the 7th round.
6. (Argentina) Diego Monarriz was interim manager in the 11th round.
7. (Argentina) Esteban Fuertes was interim manager until the end of 2018.
8. (Argentina) Raúl Sanzotti was interim manager until the end of 2018.
9. Interim manager, but later promoted to manager.
10. (Argentina) Floreal García was interim manager in the 20th round.
11. (Argentina) Daniel Oldrá was interim manager in the 21st round.
12. (Argentina) Pablo Quatrocchi was interim manager in the 21st and 22nd rounds.
13. (Argentina) Marcelo Goux was interim manager in the 22nd round.

=== Foreign players ===
| Club | Player 1 | Player 2 | Player 3 | Player 4 | Player 5 | Player 6 |
|---|---|---|---|---|---|---|
| Aldosivi | (Uruguay) Federico Gino | (Colombia) Jefferson Mena | | | | |
| Argentinos Juniors | (Paraguay) Enrique Borja | (Uruguay) Adrián Colombino | (Uruguay) Leandro Paiva | (Uruguay) Jonathan Sandoval | | |
| Atlético Tucumán | (Uruguay) Mathías Abero | (Uruguay) Andrés Lamas | (Paraguay) Tomás Rojas | | | |
| Banfield | (Colombia) Iván Arboleda | (Colombia) Reinaldo Lenis | | | | |
| Belgrano | (Uruguay) Christian Almeida | (Colombia) Mauricio Cuero | (Paraguay) Juan Patiño | (Uruguay) Cristian Techera | (Venezuela) Anthony Uribe | |
| Boca Juniors | (Paraguay) Júnior Alonso | (Colombia) Jorman Campuzano | (Colombia) Frank Fabra | (Uruguay) Nahitan Nández | (Colombia) Sebastián Villa | |
| Colón | (Uruguay) Gonzalo Bueno | (Uruguay) Leonardo Burián | (Colombia) Andrés Cadavid | (Colombia) Guillermo Celis | (Paraguay) Marcelo Estigarribia | (Colombia) Wilson Morelo |
| Defensa y Justicia | (Uruguay) Ignacio González | (Paraguay) Julio González | (Paraguay) Matías Rojas | | | |
| Estudiantes (LP) | (Uruguay) Manuel Castro | (Chile) Gonzalo Jara | (Colombia) Edwar López | | | |
| Gimnasia y Esgrima (LP) | (Paraguay) Víctor Ayala | (Peru) Alexi Gómez | (Venezuela) Jan Carlos Hurtado | (Uruguay) Santiago Silva | (Venezuela) Jesús Vargas | |
| Godoy Cruz | (Uruguay) Santiago García | (Uruguay) Miguel Merentiel | (Paraguay) Richard Prieto | (Paraguay) Diego Viera | | |
| Huracán | (Paraguay) Omar Alderete | (Colombia) Daniel Hernández | (Colombia) Andrés Felipe Roa | (Paraguay) Saúl Salcedo | (Paraguay) Antony Silva | |
| Independiente^{[1]} | (Uruguay) Renzo Bacchia | (Uruguay) Martín Campaña | (Paraguay) Cecilio Domínguez | (Ecuador) Fernando Gaibor | (Chile) Francisco Silva | (Uruguay) Gastón Silva |
| Lanús | (Paraguay) Darío Cáceres | (Paraguay) Rolando García Guerreño | (Paraguay) Pablo Martínez | (Uruguay) Sebastián Ribas | (Colombia) José Luis Sinisterra | (Brazil) Tiago Pagnussat |
| Newell's Old Boys | (Uruguay) Ángelo Gabrielli | (São Tomé and Príncipe) Luís Leal | (Paraguay) Alfio Oviedo | (Paraguay) Teodoro Paredes | (Uruguay) Ribair Rodríguez | |
| Patronato | (Paraguay) Gabriel Ávalos | | | | | |
| Racing | (Colombia) Mateo Cassierra | (Chile) Marcelo Díaz | (Uruguay) Fabricio Domínguez | (Chile) Eugenio Mena | | |
| River Plate | (Colombia) Rafael Santos Borré | (Colombia) Jorge Carrascal | (Uruguay) Nicolás de la Cruz | (Colombia) Juan Fernando Quintero | (Paraguay) Robert Rojas | |
| Rosario Central | (Colombia) Jarlan Barrera | (Colombia) Óscar Cabezas | (Uruguay) Washington Camacho | (Chile) Alfonso Parot | (Colombia) Duván Vergara | |
| San Lorenzo | (Colombia) Raúl Loaiza | (Colombia) Andrés Rentería | (Colombia) Juan Camilo Salazar | (Colombia) Gustavo Torres | | |
| San Martín (SJ) | (Colombia) Humberto Osorio | (Paraguay) Pablo Palacios Alvarenga | (Uruguay) Gianni Rodríguez | (Uruguay) Alex Silva | | |
| San Martín (T) | (Uruguay) Hernán Petryk | | | | | |
| Talleres (C) | (Peru) Miguel Araujo | (Uruguay) Junior Arias | (Colombia) Dayro Moreno | (Venezuela) Samuel Sosa | (Colombia) Diego Valoyes | |
| Tigre | (Uruguay) Gerardo Alcoba | (Uruguay) Gastón Guruceaga | (Uruguay) Hugo Silveira | (Uruguay) Diego Vera | | |
| Unión | (Colombia) Yeimar Gómez | (Uruguay) Javier Méndez | (Uruguay) Diego Zabala | | | |
| Vélez Sarsfield | (Peru) Luis Abram | (Ecuador) Alexander Domínguez | (Chile) Pablo Galdames | (Paraguay) Cristian Núñez | (Uruguay) Jonathan Ramis | |

^{1} Independiente signed a seventh foreign player due to left knee ACL rupture of (Uruguay) Carlos Benavídez.

==== Players holding Argentinian dual nationality ====
They do not take foreign slot.

- (Paraguay) Raúl Bobadilla (Argentinos Juniors)
- (Paraguay) Lucas Barrios (Huracán)
- (Armenia) Norberto Briasco-Balekian (Huracán)
- (Chile) Pablo Hernández (Independiente)
- (Switzerland) Dylan Gissi (Patronato)
- (Chile) Gabriel Arias (Racing)
- (Venezuela) Carlos Olses (Racing)
- (Uruguay) Camilo Mayada (River Plate)
- (Paraguay) Néstor Ortigoza (Rosario Central)
- (United States) Joel Soñora (Talleres (C))
- (Croatia) Mauricio Toni (Talleres (C))

Source: AFA

== League table ==
| Pos | Team | Pld | W | D | L | GF | GA | GD | Pts | Qualification |
|---|---|---|---|---|---|---|---|---|---|---|
| 1 | Racing (C) | 25 | 17 | 6 | 2 | 43 | 16 | +27 | 57 | Qualification for Copa Libertadores group stage |
| 2 | Defensa y Justicia | 25 | 15 | 8 | 2 | 33 | 18 | +15 | 53 | Qualification for Copa Libertadores group stage |
| 3 | Boca Juniors | 25 | 15 | 6 | 4 | 42 | 18 | +24 | 51 | Qualification for Copa Libertadores group stage |
| 4 | River Plate | 25 | 13 | 6 | 6 | 42 | 21 | +21 | 45 | Qualification for Copa Libertadores group stage (Note: River Plate qualified for the Copa Libertadores group stage by winning the 2018–19 Copa Argentina.) |
| 5 | Atlético Tucumán | 25 | 12 | 6 | 7 | 36 | 29 | +7 | 42 | Qualification for Copa Libertadores second stage |
| 6 | Vélez Sarsfield | 25 | 11 | 7 | 7 | 34 | 25 | +9 | 40 | Qualification for Copa Sudamericana first stage |
| 7 | Independiente | 25 | 10 | 8 | 7 | 35 | 28 | +7 | 38 | Qualification for Copa Sudamericana first stage |
| 8 | Unión | 25 | 9 | 9 | 7 | 29 | 24 | +5 | 36 | Qualification for Copa Sudamericana first stage |
| 9 | Tigre | 25 | 9 | 9 | 7 | 39 | 42 | −3 | 36 | Qualification for Copa Libertadores group stage (Note: Tigre qualified for the Copa Libertadores group stage by winning the 2019 Copa de la Superliga.) |
| 10 | Huracán | 25 | 9 | 8 | 8 | 28 | 28 | 0 | 35 | Qualification for Copa Sudamericana first stage |
| 11 | Lanús | 25 | 9 | 7 | 9 | 27 | 32 | −5 | 34 | Qualification for Copa Sudamericana first stage |
| 12 | Talleres (C) | 25 | 9 | 6 | 10 | 25 | 24 | +1 | 33 | |
| 13 | Aldosivi | 25 | 9 | 6 | 10 | 21 | 24 | −3 | 33 | |
| 14 | Godoy Cruz | 25 | 9 | 5 | 11 | 23 | 30 | −7 | 32 | |
| 15 | Newell's Old Boys | 25 | 7 | 8 | 10 | 26 | 23 | +3 | 29 | |
| 16 | Banfield | 25 | 6 | 11 | 8 | 27 | 31 | −4 | 29 | |
| 17 | Estudiantes (LP) | 25 | 7 | 8 | 10 | 21 | 25 | −4 | 29 | |
| 18 | Gimnasia y Esgrima (LP) | 25 | 8 | 5 | 12 | 21 | 32 | −11 | 29 | |
| 19 | Patronato | 25 | 7 | 5 | 13 | 29 | 37 | −8 | 26 | |
| 20 | Rosario Central | 25 | 6 | 8 | 11 | 16 | 26 | −10 | 26 | |
| 21 | San Martín (SJ) | 25 | 6 | 7 | 12 | 24 | 34 | −10 | 25 | |
| 22 | Belgrano | 25 | 4 | 12 | 9 | 16 | 23 | −7 | 24 | |
| 23 | San Lorenzo | 25 | 3 | 14 | 8 | 21 | 30 | −9 | 23 | |
| 24 | Colón | 25 | 4 | 11 | 10 | 21 | 33 | −12 | 23 | |
| 25 | San Martín (T) | 25 | 4 | 11 | 10 | 25 | 38 | −13 | 23 | |
| 26 | Argentinos Juniors | 25 | 5 | 7 | 13 | 15 | 28 | −13 | 22 | Qualification for Copa Sudamericana first stage (Note: Argentinos Juniors qualified for the Copa Sudamericana first stage as the 2019 Copa de la Superliga best team not qualified for the Copa Libertadores.) |

Source: AFA
Rules for classification: 1) points; 2) play-off (only if needed to decide championship); 3) goal difference; 4) goals scored; 5) head-to-head points; 6) head-to-head goal difference; 7) head-to-head goals scored.
(C) Champions
Notes:

2018–19 Argentine Primera División champions

18th title

== Results ==
Teams played every other team once (either at home or away) completing a total of 25 rounds.

| Home \ Away | ALD | ARG | ATU | BAN | BEL | BOC | COL | DYJ | EST | GLP | GOD | HUR | IND | LAN | NOB | PAT | RAC | RIV | ROS | SLO | SMA | SMT | TAL | TIG | UNI | VEL |
|---|---|---|---|---|---|---|---|---|---|---|---|---|---|---|---|---|---|---|---|---|---|---|---|---|---|---|
| Aldosivi | — | — | — | 1–4 | 2–0 | 1–1 | 3–0 | 0–1 | — | 0–0 | — | 2–1 | — | — | 1–0 | — | 1–3 | — | — | 2–2 | 1–0 | 2–0 | — | 0–2 | — | — |
| Argentinos Juniors | 1–2 | — | — | — | 0–0 | 0–1 | — | — | 2–1 | — | 0–0 | — | 0–2 | 2–0 | — | — | 0–2 | — | 0–2 | — | — | — | 0–2 | — | 0–1 | 0–0 |
| Atlético Tucumán | 1–0 | 0–0 | — | — | — | — | 2–1 | — | — | 4–1 | — | — | 4–2 | 0–0 | — | — | 2–2 | 0–1 | 2–1 | — | — | 2–3 | 0–0 | 3–0 | — | — |
| Banfield | — | 0–1 | 1–2 | — | — | — | — | — | 0–2 | 1–0 | 2–2 | — | 1–1 | 0–0 | 1–1 | 1–0 | — | 1–1 | — | 2–0 | 1–1 | — | — | — | — | — |
| Belgrano | — | — | 1–3 | 1–1 | — | 1–1 | — | — | 2–1 | 2–0 | 1–0 | 0–1 | — | — | 0–0 | 3–0 | — | — | — | 0–0 | 0–0 | — | — | 1–2 | 0–0 | — |
| Boca Juniors | — | — | 1–2 | 2–0 | — | — | 3–1 | — | — | — | 2–0 | — | — | 2–1 | — | 1–0 | — | 0–2 | 0–0 | 3–0 | — | — | 1–0 | 4–1 | — | 3–0 |
| Colón | — | 2–0 | — | 0–1 | 1–1 | — | — | — | 1–1 | — | 3–1 | — | — | — | 1–0 | — | 1–1 | 1–0 | — | 1–1 | 0–0 | — | — | 2–2 | 0–0 | — |
| Defensa y Justicia | — | 2–1 | 1–1 | 3–2 | 1–1 | 0–1 | 3–0 | — | 1–1 | — | — | — | — | — | — | — | — | — | — | 1–0 | — | — | 2–0 | 2–1 | 1–1 | 3–2 |
| Estudiantes (LP) | 0–2 | — | 1–1 | — | — | 2–0 | — | — | — | 1–0 | — | — | 2–2 | 1–1 | 1–0 | 1–0 | — | 1–0 | — | — | — | 1–1 | 0–1 | — | — | 1–2 |
| Gimnasia y Esgrima (LP) | — | 1–0 | — | — | — | 2–1 | 3–2 | 0–1 | — | — | 1–0 | 2–2 | 1–0 | — | 1–0 | — | 0–3 | — | 1–1 | — | 0–2 | — | 0–2 | 3–1 | — | — |
| Godoy Cruz | 2–0 | — | 1–0 | — | — | — | — | 0–1 | 1–0 | — | — | — | 1–1 | 0–2 | 2–1 | 2–1 | — | 0–4 | 0–0 | 1–0 | — | 3–2 | — | — | — | 0–2 |
| Huracán | — | 0–0 | 2–0 | 3–0 | — | 0–0 | 3–2 | 1–1 | 0–1 | — | 2–1 | — | — | — | — | — | — | 0–0 | 2–1 | — | — | 1–3 | — | — | 1–3 | 1–1 |
| Independiente | 2–0 | — | — | — | 2–1 | 0–1 | 3–0 | 0–1 | — | — | — | 3–1 | — | — | — | — | 1–3 | — | — | — | — | 4–0 | 1–1 | 0–0 | 2–1 | 2–1 |
| Lanús | 0–1 | — | — | — | 3–1 | — | 1–0 | 2–2 | — | 2–0 | — | 0–1 | 1–0 | — | — | 3–1 | 0–1 | 1–5 | 2–0 | — | 1–1 | — | 2–1 | — | — | — |
| Newell's Old Boys | — | 2–0 | 1–2 | — | — | 1–1 | — | 0–0 | — | — | — | 3–1 | 2–2 | 2–0 | — | 1–0 | — | — | 0–0 | — | 3–0 | — | 1–2 | 2–0 | — | — |
| Patronato | 0–0 | 2–1 | 3–0 | — | — | — | 0–0 | 2–0 | — | 0–2 | — | 1–0 | 1–2 | — | — | — | 0–3 | — | 2–1 | — | — | 3–3 | 2–1 | — | — | 3–3 |
| Racing | — | — | — | 0–0 | 1–0 | 2–2 | — | 1–1 | 1–0 | — | 3–0 | 3–1 | — | — | 1–0 | — | — | — | 2–0 | 2–1 | 1–0 | — | — | — | 1–0 | 2–0 |
| River Plate | 1–0 | 0–0 | — | — | 0–0 | — | — | 0–1 | — | 3–1 | — | — | 3–0 | — | 4–2 | 1–3 | 2–0 | — | — | — | 4–1 | 2–1 | — | 2–2 | 1–2 | — |
| Rosario Central | 0–0 | — | — | 1–0 | 0–0 | — | 1–1 | 0–1 | 2–1 | — | — | — | 1–2 | — | — | — | — | 1–1 | — | 0–1 | 1–0 | 2–0 | — | 0–2 | 0–4 | — |
| San Lorenzo | — | 2–3 | 0–2 | — | — | — | — | — | 1–1 | 1–1 | — | 0–0 | 0–0 | 2–2 | 1–1 | 3–2 | — | 1–1 | — | — | 2–1 | — | 0–1 | — | — | — |
| San Martín (SJ) | — | 2–3 | 1–3 | — | — | 0–4 | — | 0–1 | 3–0 | — | 0–0 | 1–2 | 1–1 | — | — | 1–0 | — | — | — | — | — | — | 2–1 | — | 2–0 | 3–1 |
| San Martín (T) | — | 0–0 | — | 1–1 | 0–0 | 1–4 | 0–0 | 1–2 | — | 1–1 | — | — | — | 1–2 | 0–3 | — | 2–1 | — | — | 0–0 | 2–0 | — | — | — | 1–1 | — |
| Talleres (C) | 0–0 | — | — | 3–1 | 3–0 | — | 2–0 | — | — | — | 1–0 | 0–0 | — | — | — | — | 1–3 | 0–2 | 0–1 | — | — | 0–0 | — | 1–3 | — | 1–1 |
| Tigre | — | 2–1 | — | 4–4 | — | — | — | — | 1–0 | — | 1–3 | 0–2 | — | 1–1 | — | 2–1 | 1–1 | — | — | 2–2 | 2–2 | 2–2 | — | — | 2–2 | — |
| Unión | 1–0 | — | 3–0 | 0–1 | — | 1–3 | — | — | 0–0 | 1–0 | 0–3 | — | — | 3–0 | 0–0 | 2–2 | — | — | — | 1–1 | — | — | 2–1 | — | — | 0–2 |
| Vélez Sarsfield | 2–0 | — | 2–0 | 1–1 | 1–0 | — | 1–1 | — | — | 1–0 | — | — | — | 4–0 | 2–0 | — | — | 1–2 | 2–0 | 0–0 | — | 1–0 | — | 1–2 | — | — |

Source: AFA
Legend: Blue = home team win; Yellow = draw; Red = away team win.

== Season statistics ==
=== Top goalscorers ===
| Rank | Player | Club | Goals |
|---|---|---|---|
| 1 | (Argentina) Lisandro López | Racing | 17 |
| 2 | (Argentina) Emmanuel Gigliotti | Independiente | 12 |
| 3 | (Argentina) Luis Miguel Rodríguez | Atlético Tucumán / Colón | 11 |
| 3 | (Argentina) Federico González | Tigre | 11 |
| 5 | (Paraguay) Matías Rojas | Defensa y Justicia | 10 |
| 6 | (Argentina) Cristian Chávez | Aldosivi | 8 |
| 6 | (Argentina) Darío Cvitanich | Banfield / Racing | 8 |
| 6 | (Argentina) Nicolás Fernández | Defensa y Justicia | 8 |
| 9 | (Uruguay) Santiago García | Godoy Cruz | 7 |
| 9 | (Argentina) José Sand | Lanús | 7 |
| 9 | (Argentina) Nicolás Blandi | San Lorenzo | 7 |
| 9 | (Argentina) Franco Fragapane | Unión | 7 |

Source: AFA

=== Top assists ===
| Rank | Player | Club | Assists |
|---|---|---|---|
| 1 | (Argentina) Walter Montillo | Tigre | 9 |
| 2 | (Argentina) Mauro Zárate | Boca Juniors | 7 |
| 3 | (Argentina) Gabriel Carabajal | Patronato | 6 |
| 4 | (Argentina) Luis Miguel Rodríguez | Atlético Tucumán / Colón | 5 |
| 4 | (Argentina) Ramón Ábila | Boca Juniors | 5 |
| 4 | (Argentina) Lucas Pratto | River Plate | 5 |
| 4 | (Argentina) Leonardo Gil | Rosario Central | 5 |

Source: AFA

== Relegation ==
Relegation at the end of the season is based on coefficients, which take into consideration the points obtained by the clubs during the present season and the two previous seasons (only seasons at the top flight are counted). The total tally is then divided by the number of games played in the top flight over those three seasons and an average is calculated. The four teams with the worst average at the end of the season were relegated to Primera B Nacional.

| Pos | Team | 2016–17 Pts | 2017–18 Pts | 2018–19 Pts | Total Pts | Total Pld | Avg | Relegation |
|---|---|---|---|---|---|---|---|---|
| 1 | Boca Juniors | 63 | 58 | 51 | 172 | 82 | 2.098 | |
| 2 | Racing | 55 | 45 | 57 | 157 | 82 | 1.915 | |
| 3 | Defensa y Justicia | 49 | 44 | 53 | 146 | 82 | 1.78 | |
| 4 | River Plate | 56 | 45 | 45 | 146 | 82 | 1.78 | |
| 5 | Independiente | 53 | 46 | 38 | 137 | 82 | 1.671 | |
| 6 | Godoy Cruz | 43 | 56 | 32 | 131 | 82 | 1.598 | |
| 7 | San Lorenzo | 53 | 50 | 23 | 126 | 82 | 1.537 | |
| 8 | Talleres (C) | 42 | 46 | 33 | 121 | 82 | 1.476 | |
| 9 | Estudiantes (LP) | 56 | 36 | 29 | 121 | 82 | 1.476 | |
| 10 | Banfield | 54 | 35 | 29 | 118 | 82 | 1.439 | |
| 11 | Vélez Sarsfield | 37 | 38 | 40 | 115 | 82 | 1.402 | |
| 12 | Lanús | 50 | 29 | 34 | 113 | 82 | 1.378 | |
| 13 | Colón | 49 | 41 | 23 | 113 | 82 | 1.378 | |
| 14 | Huracán | 29 | 48 | 35 | 112 | 82 | 1.366 | |
| 15 | Atlético Tucumán | 33 | 36 | 42 | 111 | 82 | 1.354 | |
| 16 | Unión | 32 | 43 | 36 | 111 | 82 | 1.354 | |
| 17 | Aldosivi | — | — | 33 | 33 | 25 | 1.32 | |
| 18 | Newell's Old Boys | 49 | 29 | 29 | 107 | 82 | 1.305 | |
| 19 | Rosario Central | 44 | 32 | 26 | 102 | 82 | 1.244 | |
| 20 | Argentinos Juniors | — | 41 | 22 | 63 | 52 | 1.212 | |
| 21 | Gimnasia y Esgrima (LP) | 43 | 27 | 29 | 99 | 82 | 1.207 | |
| 22 | Patronato | 34 | 33 | 26 | 93 | 82 | 1.134 | |
| 23 | Tigre (R) | 31 | 24 | 36 | 91 | 82 | 1.11 | Relegation to Primera B Nacional |
| 24 | San Martín (SJ) (R) | 33 | 33 | 25 | 91 | 82 | 1.11 | Relegation to Primera B Nacional |
| 25 | Belgrano (R) | 26 | 40 | 24 | 90 | 82 | 1.098 | Relegation to Primera B Nacional |
| 26 | San Martín (T) (R) | — | — | 23 | 23 | 25 | 0.92 | Relegation to Primera B Nacional |

Source: AFA

== Awards ==
The following players were rewarded for their performances during the season.

- Best goalkeeper: (Argentina) Esteban Andrada (Boca Juniors)
- Best defender: (Argentina) Javier Pinola (River Plate)
- Best midfielder: (Argentina) Nicolás Domínguez (Vélez Sarsfield)
- Best forward: (Argentina) Lisandro López (Racing)
- Best save: (Argentina) Alan Aguerre (Newell's Old Boys) against San Lorenzo
- Best goal: (Argentina) Emanuel Reynoso (Boca Juniors) against San Martín (T)
- Best coach: (Argentina) Eduardo Coudet (Racing)
- Best player: (Argentina) Lisandro López (Racing)
- Topscorer: (Argentina) Lisandro López (Racing)
- Honorary Award: (Argentina) Pablo Guiñazú (Talleres (C)), (Uruguay) Rodrigo Mora (River Plate), (Argentina) Rodrigo Braña (Estudiantes (LP)) and (Argentina) Sebastián Bertoli (Patronato)
- Breakthrough player: (Argentina) Matías Zaracho (Racing)
- Fair Play: Defensa y Justicia
- SAF de Oro: Racing

=== 2018–19 Superliga Argentina de Fútbol team ===
| Pos. | Player | Team |
|---|---|---|
| GK | Esteban Andrada | Boca Juniors |
| DF | Damián Martínez | Unión |
| DF | Leonardo Sigali | Racing |
| DF | Javier Pinola | River Plate |
| DF | Lisandro Martínez | Defensa y Justicia |
| MF | Nicolás Domínguez | Vélez Sarsfield |
| MF | Walter Montillo | Tigre |
| MF | Juan Fernando Quintero | River Plate |
| MF | Matías Rojas | Defensa y Justicia |
| FW | Lisandro López | Racing |
| FW | Federico González | Tigre |

== Attendances ==
Source: AFA

| No. | Club | Average |
|---|---|---|
| 1 | Boca Juniors | 44,712 |
| 2 | River Plate | 40,894 |
| 3 | Racing | 39,571 |
| 4 | Rosario Central | 32,438 |
| 5 | Independiente | 29,946 |
| 6 | Newell's Old Boys | 28,302 |
| 7 | Atlético Tucumán | 23,974 |
| 8 | Talleres (C) | 23,185 |
| 9 | San Martín (T) | 22,817 |
| 10 | Belgrano | 22,649 |
| 11 | San Lorenzo | 21,593 |
| 12 | Colón | 20,721 |
| 13 | Vélez Sarsfield | 19,912 |
| 14 | Huracán | 17,498 |
| 15 | Unión | 16,237 |
| 16 | Gimnasia y Esgrima (LP) | 15,061 |
| 17 | Estudiantes (LP) | 14,784 |
| 18 | Tigre | 13,345 |
| 19 | Banfield | 11,922 |
| 20 | Lanús | 11,476 |
| 21 | Godoy Cruz | 10,109 |
| 22 | Aldosivi | 9,586 |
| 23 | San Martín (SJ) | 9,041 |
| 24 | Argentinos Juniors | 8,672 |
| 25 | Defensa y Justicia | 7,839 |
| 26 | Patronato | 3,428 |

== See also ==
- 2019 Copa de la Superliga
- 2018–19 Primera B Nacional
- 2018–19 Copa Argentina
