= 2017 Copa Libertadores group stage =

The 2017 Copa Libertadores group stage was played from 7 March to 25 May 2017. A total of 32 football teams competed in the group stage to decide the 16 places in the final stages of the 2017 Copa Libertadores.

== Draw ==
The draw for the group stage was held on 21 December 2016, 20:00 PYST (UTC−3), at the CONMEBOL Convention Centre in Luque, Paraguay.

Teams were seeded by their CONMEBOL ranking of the Copa Libertadores (shown in parentheses), taking into account of the following three factors:

1. Performance in the last 10 years, taking into account Copa Libertadores results in the period 2007–2016
2. Historical coefficient, taking into account Copa Libertadores results in the period 1960–2006
3. Local tournament champion, with bonus points awarded to domestic league champions of the last 10 years

For the group stage, the 32 teams were drawn into eight groups (Groups 1–8) of four containing a team from each of the four pots. Teams from the same association could not be drawn into the same group, excluding the winners of the third stage, which were allocated to Pot 4 and whose identity was not known at the time of the draw, and could be drawn into the same group with another team from the same association.

Pot 1	Pot 2	Pot 3	Pot 4
(Colombia) Atlético Nacional (3); (Argentina) River Plate (2); (Uruguay) Nacional (4); (Uruguay) Peñarol (5); (Brazil) Atlético Mineiro (9); (Brazil) Grêmio (12); (Argentina) San Lorenzo (14); (Brazil) Santos (15)	(Brazil) Chapecoense (no rank); (Argentina) Estudiantes (17); (Ecuador) Emelec (18); (Paraguay) Libertad (21); (Colombia) Santa Fe (22); (Brazil) Palmeiras (25); (Chile) Universidad Católica (30); (Paraguay) Guaraní (34)	(Peru) Sporting Cristal (35); (Brazil) Flamengo (37); (Ecuador) Barcelona (39); (Argentina) Lanús (42); (Venezuela) Zamora (66); (Bolivia) Jorge Wilstermann (75); (Colombia) Independiente Medellín (77); (Argentina) Godoy Cruz (88)	(Peru) Melgar (104); (Chile) Deportes Iquique (115); (Bolivia) Sport Boys (162); (Venezuela) Zulia (no rank); Third stage winner G1; Third stage winner G2; Third stage winner G3; Third stage winner G4

Notes

1. ^{†} Defending Copa Libertadores champion, automatically seeded into Pot 1 and allocated to Group 1 in the group stage draw.
2. ^{‡} Defending Copa Sudamericana champion, automatically seeded into Pot 2 in the group stage draw.

The following were the four winners of the third stage of qualifying which joined the 28 direct entrants in the group stage.

Match	Third stage winners
G1	(Brazil) Atlético Paranaense (71)
G2	(Brazil) Botafogo (79)
G3	(Bolivia) The Strongest (28)
G4	(Argentina) Atlético Tucumán (no rank)

== Format ==
In the group stage, each group was played on a home-and-away round-robin basis. The teams were ranked according to points (3 points for a win, 1 point for a draw, and 0 points for a loss). If tied on points, the following criteria would be used to determine the ranking: 1. Goal difference; 2. Goals scored; 3. Away goals scored; 4. CONMEBOL ranking (Regulations Article 5.1).

The winners and runners-up of each group advanced to the round of 16 of the knockout stages. The third-placed teams of each group entered the Copa Sudamericana second stage.

== Groups ==
The fixture list was determined by the draw as follows:

- Round 1: Team 3 vs. Team 1, Team 4 vs. Team 2
- Round 2: Team 1 vs. Team 4, Team 2 vs. Team 3
- Round 3: Team 2 vs. Team 1, Team 3 vs. Team 4
- Round 4: Team 1 vs. Team 2, Team 4 vs. Team 3
- Round 5: Team 4 vs. Team 1, Team 3 vs. Team 2
- Round 6: Team 1 vs. Team 3, Team 2 vs. Team 4

The matches were played on 7–9, 14–16 March, 11–13, 18–20 April, 25–27 April, 2–4, 10, 16–18 and 23–25 May 2017.

=== Group 1 ===
Pos	Team	Pld	W	D	L	GF	GA	GD	Pts	Qualification	BOT	BAR	EST	ATN
1	(Brazil) Botafogo	6	3	1	2	6	5	+1	10	Round of 16	—	0–2	2–1	1–0
2	(Ecuador) Barcelona	6	3	1	2	8	8	0	10	Round of 16	1–1	—	0–3	2–1
3	(Argentina) Estudiantes	6	3	0	3	7	8	−1	9	Copa Sudamericana	1–0	0–2	—	1–0
4	(Colombia) Atlético Nacional	6	2	0	4	8	8	0	6		0–2	3–1	4–1	—

Source: CONMEBOL
14 March 2017
21:00 UTC−3

Botafogo (Brazil)	2–1	(Argentina) Estudiantes
Roger 33'; Rodrigo Pimpão 78'	Report	Otero 61'

Estádio Olímpico Nilton Santos, Rio de Janeiro
Attendance: 30,107
Referee: Jonhatan Fuentes (Uruguay)
14 March 2017
19:45 UTC−5

Barcelona (Ecuador)	2–1	(Colombia) Atlético Nacional
Álvez 24'; M. Caicedo 45'	Report	Mosquera 13'

Estadio Monumental Isidro Romero Carbo, Guayaquil
Attendance: 40,000
Referee: Julio Bascuñán (Chile)

11 April 2017
21:00 UTC−3

Estudiantes (Argentina)	0–2	(Ecuador) Barcelona
	Report	Mena 51'; Nahuelpán 90+1'

Estadio Ciudad de La Plata, La Plata
Attendance: 30,000
Referee: Víctor Carrillo (Peru)
13 April 2017
19:45 UTC−5

Atlético Nacional (Colombia)	0–2	(Brazil) Botafogo
	Report	Camilo 38'; Guilherme 90+2'

Estadio Atanasio Girardot, Medellín
Attendance: 40,638
Referee: Ulises Mereles (Paraguay)

19 April 2017
19:30 UTC−3

Estudiantes (Argentina)	1–0	(Colombia) Atlético Nacional
Toledo 37'	Report

Estadio Ciudad de La Plata, La Plata
Attendance: 35,000
Referee: Andrés Cunha (Uruguay)
20 April 2017
19:45 UTC−5

Barcelona (Ecuador)	1–1	(Brazil) Botafogo
Alemán 31'	Report	Sassá 88' (pen.)

Estadio Monumental Isidro Romero Carbo, Guayaquil
Attendance: 45,174
Referee: Jesús Valenzuela (Venezuela)

2 May 2017
19:00 UTC−5

Atlético Nacional (Colombia)	4–1	(Argentina) Estudiantes
Uribe 35'; Moreno 44'; Ibargüen 46'; Torres 68'	Report	Iritier 66'

Estadio Atanasio Girardot, Medellín
Attendance: 23,759
Referee: Diego Haro (Peru)
2 May 2017
21:45 UTC−3

Botafogo (Brazil)	0–2	(Ecuador) Barcelona
	Report	Ayoví 6'; Álvez 23'

Estádio Olímpico Nilton Santos, Rio de Janeiro
Attendance: 34,034
Referee: Mario Díaz de Vivar (Paraguay)

18 May 2017
17:30 UTC−5

Barcelona (Ecuador)	0–3	(Argentina) Estudiantes
	Report	Cavallaro 28'; Sánchez 52', 79'

Estadio Monumental Isidro Romero Carbo, Guayaquil
Attendance: 20,000
Referee: Éber Aquino (Paraguay)
18 May 2017
21:45 UTC−3

Botafogo (Brazil)	1–0	(Colombia) Atlético Nacional
Rodrigo Pimpão 50'	Report

Estádio Olímpico Nilton Santos, Rio de Janeiro
Attendance: 33,317
Referee: Víctor Carrillo (Peru)

25 May 2017
19:45 UTC−5

Atlético Nacional (Colombia)	3–1	(Ecuador) Barcelona
Moreno 18' (pen.); Arreaga 26' (o.g.); Aimar 67' (o.g.)	Report	Ayoví 3'

Estadio Atanasio Girardot, Medellín
Attendance: 19,867
Referee: Juan Nelio García (Bolivia)
25 May 2017
21:45 UTC−3

Estudiantes (Argentina)	1–0	(Brazil) Botafogo
Solari 24'	Report

Estadio Centenario Dr. José Luis Meiszner, Quilmes (Note: Estudiantes played their home match against Botafogo at Quilmes instead of their regular stadium at La Plata.)
Attendance: 25,000
Referee: Eduardo Gamboa (Chile)

=== Group 2 ===
Pos	Team	Pld	W	D	L	GF	GA	GD	Pts	Qualification	SAN	STR	SFE	CRI
1	(Brazil) Santos	6	3	3	0	11	4	+7	12	Round of 16	—	2–0	3–2	4–0
2	(Bolivia) The Strongest	6	2	3	1	9	5	+4	9	Round of 16	1–1	—	2–0	5–1
3	(Colombia) Santa Fe	6	2	2	2	8	6	+2	8	Copa Sudamericana	0–0	1–1	—	3–0
4	(Peru) Sporting Cristal	6	0	2	4	2	15	−13	2		1–1	0–0	0–2	—

Source: CONMEBOL
9 March 2017
20:00 UTC−4

The Strongest (Bolivia)	2–0	(Colombia) Santa Fe
Chumacero 54', 80'	Report

Estadio Hernando Siles, La Paz
Attendance: 25,000
Referee: Patricio Loustau (Argentina)
9 March 2017
19:45 UTC−5

Sporting Cristal (Peru)	1–1	(Brazil) Santos
Cazulo 13'	Report	Thiago Maia 66'

Estadio Nacional, Lima
Attendance: 20,000
Referee: José Argote (Venezuela)

16 March 2017
19:45 UTC−5

Santa Fe (Colombia)	3–0	(Peru) Sporting Cristal
Arango 9'; Gómez 77', 90+1'	Report

Estadio El Campín, Bogotá
Attendance: 17,464
Referee: Carlos Orbe (Ecuador)
16 March 2017
21:45 UTC−3

Santos (Brazil)	2–0	(Bolivia) The Strongest
Ricardo Oliveira 45+1'; Renato 83'	Report

Estádio Urbano Caldeira, Santos
Attendance: 13,132
Referee: Néstor Pitana (Argentina)

18 April 2017
19:45 UTC−5

Sporting Cristal (Peru)	0–0	(Bolivia) The Strongest
	Report

Estadio Nacional, Lima
Attendance: 10,000
Referee: Mario Díaz de Vivar (Paraguay)
19 April 2017
19:45 UTC−5

Santa Fe (Colombia)	0–0	(Brazil) Santos
	Report

Estadio El Campín, Bogotá
Attendance: 19,742
Referee: Fernando Rapallini (Argentina)

4 May 2017
18:30 UTC−4

The Strongest (Bolivia)	5–1	(Peru) Sporting Cristal
Alonso 18' (pen.), 36'; Chumacero 30'; Martelli 61'; Veizaga 70'	Report	D. Bejarano 52' (o.g.)

Estadio Hernando Siles, La Paz
Attendance: 14,000
Referee: Mauro Vigliano (Argentina)
4 May 2017
21:45 UTC−3

Santos (Brazil)	3–2	(Colombia) Santa Fe
Ricardo Oliveira 3'; Vitor Bueno 34'; Lucas Veríssimo 77'	Report	Arango 33'; Perlaza 40'

Estádio do Pacaembu, São Paulo
Attendance: 29,798
Referee: Andrés Cunha (Uruguay)

17 May 2017
17:30 UTC−5

Sporting Cristal (Peru)	0–2	(Colombia) Santa Fe
	Report	Arango 19'; Plata 90+1'

Estadio Nacional, Lima
Attendance: 5,000
Referee: Néstor Pitana (Argentina)
17 May 2017
18:30 UTC−4

The Strongest (Bolivia)	1–1	(Brazil) Santos
Chumacero 39'	Report	Vitor Bueno 67'

Estadio Hernando Siles, La Paz
Attendance: 19,000
Referee: Darío Herrera (Argentina)

23 May 2017
21:45 UTC−3

Santos (Brazil)	4–0	(Peru) Sporting Cristal
David Braz 19', 71'; Ricardo Oliveira 22'; Vitor Bueno 66'	Report

Estádio Urbano Caldeira, Santos
Attendance: 6,632
Referee: José Méndez (Paraguay)
23 May 2017
19:45 UTC−5

Santa Fe (Colombia)	1–1	(Bolivia) The Strongest
Ceter 25'	Report	López 38' (o.g.)

Estadio El Campín, Bogotá
Attendance: 20,000
Referee: Enrique Cáceres (Paraguay)

=== Group 3 ===
Pos	Team	Pld	W	D	L	GF	GA	GD	Pts	Qualification	RIV	EME	DIM	MEL
1	(Argentina) River Plate	6	4	1	1	14	9	+5	13	Round of 16	—	1–1	1–2	4–2
2	(Ecuador) Emelec	6	3	1	2	8	5	+3	10	Round of 16	1–2	—	1–0	3–0
3	(Colombia) Independiente Medellín	6	3	0	3	8	8	0	9	Copa Sudamericana	1–3	1–2	—	2–0
4	(Peru) Melgar	6	1	0	5	6	14	−8	3		2–3	1–0	1–2	—

Source: CONMEBOL
14 March 2017
17:30 UTC−5

Melgar (Peru)	1–0	(Ecuador) Emelec
García 76'	Report

Estadio Monumental de la UNSA, Arequipa
Attendance: 15,000
Referee: Sandro Ricci (Brazil)
15 March 2017
19:00 UTC−5

Independiente Medellín (Colombia)	1–3	(Argentina) River Plate
Quintero 88' (pen.)	Report	Alario 29' (pen.); Driussi 33'; Martínez Quarta 51'

Estadio Atanasio Girardot, Medellín
Attendance: 40,482
Referee: Wilton Sampaio (Brazil)

13 April 2017
17:30 UTC−5

Emelec (Ecuador)	1–0	(Colombia) Independiente Medellín
Preciado 66'	Report

Estadio George Capwell, Guayaquil
Attendance: 20,000
Referee: Luiz Flávio de Oliveira (Brazil)
13 April 2017
21:00 UTC−3

River Plate (Argentina)	4–2	(Peru) Melgar
I. Fernández 17'; Driussi 21', 66'; Martínez Quarta 26'	Report	Herrera 4', 24'

Estadio Monumental Antonio Vespucio Liberti, Buenos Aires
Attendance: 35,000
Referee: Raúl Orosco (Bolivia)

20 April 2017
19:00 UTC−5

Independiente Medellín (Colombia)	2–0	(Peru) Melgar
Viola 12'; Mosquera 63'	Report

Estadio Atanasio Girardot, Medellín
Attendance: 23,508
Referee: Leodán González (Uruguay)
27 April 2017 (Note: The Melgar v Independiente Medellín match of round 4 was played before the Emelec v River Plate match of round 3 in Group 3.)
19:00 UTC−5

Emelec (Ecuador)	1–2	(Argentina) River Plate
Preciado 1'	Report	Moreira 41'; Alario 80'

Estadio George Capwell, Guayaquil
Attendance: 40,000
Referee: Roberto Tobar (Chile)

26 April 2017
19:00 UTC−5

Melgar (Peru)	1–2	(Colombia) Independiente Medellín
Herrera 69'	Report	Piedrahita 72'; Quintero 74'

Estadio Monumental de la UNSA, Arequipa
Attendance: 15,000
Referee: Anderson Daronco (Brazil)
10 May 2017
19:15 UTC−3 (Note: The River Plate v Emelec match was originally scheduled on 10 May 2017, 21:00 local time, but was re-scheduled to 19:15 local time.)

River Plate (Argentina)	1–1	(Ecuador) Emelec
Mora 67' (pen.)	Report	Preciado 59'

Estadio Monumental Antonio Vespucio Liberti, Buenos Aires
Attendance: 25,000
Referee: Anderson Daronco (Brazil)

16 May 2017
21:15 UTC−5

Independiente Medellín (Colombia)	1–2	(Ecuador) Emelec
Viola 17'	Report	Angulo 3', 26'

Estadio Atanasio Girardot, Medellín
Attendance: 27,104
Referee: Daniel Fedorczuk (Uruguay)
18 May 2017
19:00 UTC−5

Melgar (Peru)	2–3	(Argentina) River Plate
O. Fernández 23'; Herrera 61'	Report	Alario 11'; Mayada 19'; I. Fernández 69'

Estadio Monumental de la UNSA, Arequipa
Attendance: 10,000
Referee: Jesús Valenzuela (Venezuela)

25 May 2017
19:30 UTC−3

River Plate (Argentina)	1–2	(Colombia) Independiente Medellín
Mina 82'	Report	Hernández 47'; Mosquera 55'

Estadio Monumental Antonio Vespucio Liberti, Buenos Aires
Attendance: 45,000
Referee: Raphael Claus (Brazil)
25 May 2017
17:30 UTC−5

Emelec (Ecuador)	3–0	(Peru) Melgar
Orejuela 27'; Quiñónez 49'; Angulo 78'	Report

Estadio George Capwell, Guayaquil
Attendance: 20,000
Referee: Leodán González (Uruguay)

=== Group 4 ===
Pos	Team	Pld	W	D	L	GF	GA	GD	Pts	Qualification	SLA	CAP	FLA	UCA
1	(Argentina) San Lorenzo	6	3	1	2	8	8	0	10	Round of 16	—	0–1	2–1	2–1
2	(Brazil) Atlético Paranaense	6	3	1	2	9	10	−1	10	Round of 16	0–3	—	2–1	2–2
3	(Brazil) Flamengo	6	3	0	3	11	7	+4	9	Copa Sudamericana	4–0	2–1	—	3–1
4	(Chile) Universidad Católica	6	1	2	3	8	11	−3	5		1–1	2–3	1–0	—

Source: CONMEBOL
7 March 2017
21:00 UTC−3

Atlético Paranaense (Brazil)	2–2	(Chile) Universidad Católica
L. González 4'; Nikão 75'	Report	Llanos 85'; Noir 88'

Arena da Baixada, Curitiba
Attendance: 24,118
Referee: Ulises Mereles (Paraguay)
8 March 2017
21:45 UTC−3

Flamengo (Brazil)	4–0	(Argentina) San Lorenzo
Diego 47'; Trauco 61'; Rômulo 70'; Gabriel 87'	Report

Estádio do Maracanã, Rio de Janeiro
Attendance: 60,089
Referee: Andrés Cunha (Uruguay)

15 March 2017
19:30 UTC−3

San Lorenzo (Argentina)	0–1	(Brazil) Atlético Paranaense
	Report	L. González 3'

Estadio Pedro Bidegain, Buenos Aires
Attendance: 8,000
Referee: Roddy Zambrano (Ecuador)
15 March 2017
21:45 UTC−3

Universidad Católica (Chile)	1–0	(Brazil) Flamengo
Silva 74'	Report

Estadio San Carlos de Apoquindo, Las Condes
Attendance: 14,000
Referee: Diego Haro (Peru)

12 April 2017
21:00 UTC−3

Universidad Católica (Chile)	1–1	(Argentina) San Lorenzo
Buonanotte 49'	Report	Blandi 19'

Estadio San Carlos de Apoquindo, Las Condes
Attendance: 15,000
Referee: Enrique Cáceres (Paraguay)
12 April 2017
21:45 UTC−3

Flamengo (Brazil)	2–1	(Brazil) Atlético Paranaense
Guerrero 6'; Diego 15'	Report	Nikão 58'

Estádio do Maracanã, Rio de Janeiro
Attendance: 58,558
Referee: Wilson Lamouroux (Colombia)

25 April 2017
21:00 UTC−3

San Lorenzo (Argentina)	2–1	(Chile) Universidad Católica
Blandi 35'; Barrios 85'	Report	Cordero 77'

Estadio Pedro Bidegain, Buenos Aires
Attendance: 15,000
Referee: Daniel Fedorczuk (Uruguay)
26 April 2017
21:45 UTC−3

Atlético Paranaense (Brazil)	2–1	(Brazil) Flamengo
Thiago Heleno 35'; Felipe Gedoz 87'	Report	Willian Arão 89'

Arena da Baixada, Curitiba
Attendance: 36,519
Referee: José Argote (Venezuela)

3 May 2017
21:00 UTC−3

Atlético Paranaense (Brazil)	0–3	(Argentina) San Lorenzo
	Report	Díaz 13'; Blandi 67'; Botta 90+1'

Arena da Baixada, Curitiba
Attendance: 25,387
Referee: Wilmar Roldán (Colombia)
3 May 2017
21:45 UTC−3

Flamengo (Brazil)	3–1	(Chile) Universidad Católica
Rodinei 50'; Guerrero 72'; Trauco 85'	Report	Silva 66'

Estádio do Maracanã, Rio de Janeiro
Attendance: 60,989
Referee: Víctor Carrillo (Peru)

17 May 2017
21:45 UTC−3

San Lorenzo (Argentina)	2–1	(Brazil) Flamengo
Angeleri 74'; Belluschi 90+1'	Report	Rodinei 13'

Estadio Pedro Bidegain, Buenos Aires
Attendance: 35,000
Referee: Enrique Cáceres (Paraguay)
17 May 2017
20:45 UTC−4

Universidad Católica (Chile)	2–3	(Brazil) Atlético Paranaense
Silva 35'; Noir 84'	Report	Eduardo da Silva 75'; Douglas Coutinho 81'; Carlos Alberto 86'

Estadio San Carlos de Apoquindo, Las Condes
Attendance: 13,000
Referee: Jonhatan Fuentes (Uruguay)

=== Group 5 ===
Pos	Team	Pld	W	D	L	GF	GA	GD	Pts	Qualification	PAL	WIL	ATU	PEN
1	(Brazil) Palmeiras	6	4	1	1	13	9	+4	13	Round of 16	—	1–0	3–1	3–2
2	(Bolivia) Jorge Wilstermann	6	3	0	3	12	10	+2	9	Round of 16	3–2	—	2–1	6–2
3	(Argentina) Atlético Tucumán	6	2	1	3	8	10	−2	7	Copa Sudamericana	1–1	2–1	—	2–1
4	(Uruguay) Peñarol	6	2	0	4	11	15	−4	6		2–3	2–0	2–1	—

Source: CONMEBOL
7 March 2017
18:30 UTC−4

Jorge Wilstermann (Bolivia)	6–2	(Uruguay) Peñarol
Ríos 6', 32'; Thomaz 26' (pen.); Zenteno 73'; Cardozo 84' (pen.); Olego 87'	Report	G. Rodríguez 48', 69'

Estadio Félix Capriles, Cochabamba
Attendance: 30,000
Referee: Víctor Carrillo (Peru)
8 March 2017
21:45 UTC−3

Atlético Tucumán (Argentina)	1–1	(Brazil) Palmeiras
Zampedri 24'	Report	Keno 39'

Estadio Monumental José Fierro, Tucumán
Attendance: 35,000
Referee: Mario Díaz de Vivar (Paraguay)

15 March 2017
21:45 UTC−3

Palmeiras (Brazil)	1–0	(Bolivia) Jorge Wilstermann
Mina 90+5'	Report

Allianz Parque, São Paulo
Attendance: 38,419
Referee: Eduardo Gamboa (Chile)
16 March 2017
21:00 UTC−3

Peñarol (Uruguay)	2–1	(Argentina) Atlético Tucumán
Hernández 66'; Affonso 68'	Report	Menéndez 60'

Estadio Campeón del Siglo, Montevideo
Attendance: 28,000
Referee: Wilmar Roldán (Colombia)

11 April 2017
18:30 UTC−4

Jorge Wilstermann (Bolivia)	2–1	(Argentina) Atlético Tucumán
Álvarez 62'; Cabezas 71'	Report	Palomino 55'

Estadio Félix Capriles, Cochabamba
Attendance: 4,471
Referee: Roberto Tobar (Chile)
12 April 2017
21:45 UTC−3

Palmeiras (Brazil)	3–2	(Uruguay) Peñarol
Willian 46'; Dudu 49'; Fabiano 90+9'	Report	R. Arias 31'; G. Rodríguez 74'

Allianz Parque, São Paulo
Attendance: 38,483
Referee: Roddy Zambrano (Ecuador)

25 April 2017
19:30 UTC−3

Atlético Tucumán (Argentina)	2–1	(Bolivia) Jorge Wilstermann
Canuto 50'; Barbona 73'	Report	Cabezas 78'

Estadio Monumental José Fierro, Tucumán
Attendance: 30,000
Referee: Juan Soto (Venezuela)
26 April 2017
21:45 UTC−3

Peñarol (Uruguay)	2–3	(Brazil) Palmeiras
Affonso 12'; J. Arias 38'	Report	Willian 48', 72'; Mina 62'

Estadio Campeón del Siglo, Montevideo
Attendance: 20,000
Referee: Enrique Cáceres (Paraguay)

2 May 2017
19:30 UTC−3

Atlético Tucumán (Argentina)	2–1	(Uruguay) Peñarol
Zampedri 76'; González 79'	Report	G. Rodríguez 83'

Estadio Monumental José Fierro, Tucumán
Attendance: 32,000
Referee: Julio Bascuñán (Chile)
3 May 2017
20:45 UTC−4

Jorge Wilstermann (Bolivia)	3–2	(Brazil) Palmeiras
Morales 35'; Machado 40'; Cardozo 68' (pen.)	Report	Guerra 45'; Cabezas 72' (o.g.)

Estadio Félix Capriles, Cochabamba
Attendance: 22,000
Referee: Wilson Lamouroux (Colombia)

24 May 2017
21:45 UTC−3

Peñarol (Uruguay)	2–0	(Bolivia) Jorge Wilstermann
J. Arias 36'; Villalba 41'	Report

Estadio Campeón del Siglo, Montevideo
Attendance: 0 (Note: Peñarol played their home match against Jorge Wilstermann behind closed doors due to incidents in their home match against Palmeiras.)
Referee: Michael Espinoza (Peru)
24 May 2017
21:45 UTC−3

Palmeiras (Brazil)	3–1	(Argentina) Atlético Tucumán
Mina 14'; Willian 68'; Zé Roberto 90'	Report	Rodríguez 56'

Allianz Parque, São Paulo
Attendance: 37,418
Referee: Wilmar Roldán (Colombia)

=== Group 6 ===
Pos	Team	Pld	W	D	L	GF	GA	GD	Pts	Qualification	CAM	GOD	LIB	SBO
1	(Brazil) Atlético Mineiro	6	4	1	1	17	6	+11	13	Round of 16	—	4–1	2–0	5–2
2	(Argentina) Godoy Cruz	6	3	2	1	10	8	+2	11	Round of 16	1–1	—	1–1	2–0
3	(Paraguay) Libertad	6	1	3	2	7	9	−2	6	Copa Sudamericana	1–0	1–2	—	1–1
4	(Bolivia) Sport Boys	6	0	2	4	8	19	−11	2		1–5	1–3	3–3	—

Source: CONMEBOL
8 March 2017
18:30 UTC−4

Sport Boys (Bolivia)	3–3	(Paraguay) Libertad
Castillo 39'; Messidoro 69'; Coimbra 81'	Report	Medina 28'; Salcedo 61', 73' (pen.)

Estadio Ramón Tahuichi Aguilera, Santa Cruz de la Sierra
Attendance: 2,100
Referee: Roddy Zambrano (Ecuador)
8 March 2017
19:30 UTC−3

Godoy Cruz (Argentina)	1–1	(Brazil) Atlético Mineiro
J. Correa 1'	Report	Fred 50' (pen.)

Estadio Malvinas Argentinas, Mendoza
Attendance: 15,000
Referee: Wilson Lamouroux (Colombia)

11 April 2017
18:30 UTC−4

Libertad (Paraguay)	1–2	(Argentina) Godoy Cruz
Lucena 21'	Report	González 45', 89'

Estadio Dr. Nicolás Léoz, Asunción
Attendance: 8,000
Referee: Daniel Fedorczuk (Uruguay)
13 April 2017
19:30 UTC−3

Atlético Mineiro (Brazil)	5–2	(Bolivia) Sport Boys
Robinho 4'; Fred 71', 74', 88', 90+2'	Report	Tenorio 10'; Messidoro 54'

Estádio Independência, Belo Horizonte
Attendance: 18,402
Referee: José Argote (Venezuela)

19 April 2017
20:45 UTC−4

Libertad (Paraguay)	1–0	(Brazil) Atlético Mineiro
Lucena 26'	Report

Estadio Dr. Nicolás Léoz, Asunción
Attendance: 10,000
Referee: Julio Bascuñán (Chile)
20 April 2017
19:30 UTC−3

Godoy Cruz (Argentina)	2–0	(Bolivia) Sport Boys
Fernández 56'; J. Correa 73'	Report

Estadio Malvinas Argentinas, Mendoza
Attendance: 10,000
Referee: Omar Ponce (Ecuador)

26 April 2017
19:30 UTC−3

Atlético Mineiro (Brazil)	2–0	(Paraguay) Libertad
Robinho 71'; Cazares 88'	Report

Estádio Independência, Belo Horizonte
Attendance: 18,838
Referee: Wilson Lamouroux (Colombia)
27 April 2017
20:45 UTC−4

Sport Boys (Bolivia)	1–3	(Argentina) Godoy Cruz
Córdoba 69'	Report	González 41'; Garro 65'; Giménez 85'

Estadio Ramón Tahuichi Aguilera, Santa Cruz de la Sierra
Attendance: 3,000
Referee: Víctor Carrillo (Peru)

3 May 2017
18:30 UTC−4

Sport Boys (Bolivia)	1–5	(Brazil) Atlético Mineiro
Castillo 41' (pen.)	Report	Cazares 10', 88'; Rafael Moura 16'; Elias 60'; Otero 62'

Estadio Ramón Tahuichi Aguilera, Santa Cruz de la Sierra
Attendance: 2,100
Referee: Jesús Valenzuela (Venezuela)
4 May 2017
21:00 UTC−3

Godoy Cruz (Argentina)	1–1	(Paraguay) Libertad
Garro 39'	Report	Santacruz 23'

Estadio Malvinas Argentinas, Mendoza
Attendance: 27,000
Referee: Roberto Tobar (Chile)

16 May 2017
21:00 UTC−3

Atlético Mineiro (Brazil)	4–1	(Argentina) Godoy Cruz
Cazares 3', 28'; Elias 45+1'; Fred 48'	Report	Garro 72'

Estádio Independência, Belo Horizonte
Attendance: 17,009
Referee: Michael Espinoza (Peru)
16 May 2017
20:00 UTC−4

Libertad (Paraguay)	1–1	(Bolivia) Sport Boys
Rivero 17' (o.g.)	Report	Vogliotti 70'

Estadio Dr. Nicolás Léoz, Asunción
Attendance: 1,000
Referee: Adrián Cabello (Venezuela)

=== Group 7 ===
Pos	Team	Pld	W	D	L	GF	GA	GD	Pts	Qualification	LAN	NAC	CHA	ZUL
1	(Argentina) Lanús	6	4	1	1	13	3	+10	13	Round of 16	—	0–1	3–0 (Note: CONMEBOL awarded Lanús a 3–0 win as a result of Chapecoense fielding the ineligible player Luiz Otávio. The match originally ended 1–2.)	5–0
2	(Uruguay) Nacional	6	2	2	2	5	3	+2	8	Round of 16	0–1	—	3–0	0–1
3	(Brazil) Chapecoense	6	2	1	3	6	12	−6	7	Copa Sudamericana	1–3	1–1	—	2–1
4	(Venezuela) Zulia	6	1	2	3	4	10	−6	5		1–1	0–0	1–2	—

Source: CONMEBOL
Notes:
7 March 2017
20:45 UTC−4

Zulia (Venezuela)	1–2	(Brazil) Chapecoense
Arango 77'	Report	Reinaldo 32'; Luiz Antônio 68'

Estadio José Pachencho Romero, Maracaibo
Attendance: 36,000
Referee: Omar Ponce (Ecuador)
9 March 2017
21:00 UTC−3

Lanús (Argentina)	0–1	(Uruguay) Nacional
	Report	Silveira 25'

Estadio Ciudad de Lanús, Lanús
Attendance: 17,500
Referee: Roberto Tobar (Chile)

15 March 2017
19:30 UTC−3

Nacional (Uruguay)	0–1	(Venezuela) Zulia
	Report	Savarino 30'

Estadio Gran Parque Central, Montevideo
Attendance: 18,000
Referee: Wilson Lamouroux (Colombia)
16 March 2017
19:30 UTC−3

Chapecoense (Brazil)	1–3	(Argentina) Lanús
Rossi 49'	Report	Aguirre 52'; Sand 66' (pen.); Acosta 80'

Arena Condá, Chapecó
Attendance: 12,484
Referee: Enrique Cáceres (Paraguay)

18 April 2017
21:00 UTC−3

Lanús (Argentina)	5–0	(Venezuela) Zulia
Acosta 4'; Sand 46'; Denis 73' (pen.); Silva 78'; Pasquini 80'	Report

Estadio Ciudad de Lanús, Lanús
Attendance: 5,000
Referee: Diego Haro (Peru)
18 April 2017
21:45 UTC−3

Chapecoense (Brazil)	1–1	(Uruguay) Nacional
Reinaldo 9' (pen.)	Report	Silveira 40'

Arena Condá, Chapecó
Attendance: 12,320
Referee: Carlos Orbe (Ecuador)

27 April 2017 (Note: The Nacional v Chapecoense match was originally scheduled on 25 April 2017, 21:45 local time, but was re-scheduled to 27 April 2017, 19:30 local time.)
19:30 UTC−3

Nacional (Uruguay)	3–0	(Brazil) Chapecoense
Ramírez 17'; Aguirre 49'; Viudez 80'	Report

Estadio Gran Parque Central, Montevideo
Attendance: 35,000
Referee: Éber Aquino (Paraguay)
27 April 2017
18:30 UTC−4

Zulia (Venezuela)	1–1	(Argentina) Lanús
Rivillo 34'	Report	Sand 62'

Estadio José Pachencho Romero, Maracaibo
Attendance: 12,000
Referee: Wilmar Roldán (Colombia)

16 May 2017
18:30 UTC−4

Zulia (Venezuela)	0–0	(Uruguay) Nacional
	Report

Estadio José Pachencho Romero, Maracaibo
Attendance: 10,000
Referee: Patricio Polic (Chile)
17 May 2017
21:45 UTC−3

Lanús (Argentina)	3–0 Awarded (Note: CONMEBOL awarded Lanús a 3–0 win as a result of Chapecoense fielding the ineligible player Luiz Otávio. The match originally ended 1–2.)	(Brazil) Chapecoense
Sand 79' (pen.)	Report	Wellington Paulista 23'; Luiz Otávio 87'

Estadio Ciudad de Lanús, Lanús
Attendance: 20,000
Referee: Wilson Lamouroux (Colombia)

23 May 2017
19:30 UTC−3

Nacional (Uruguay)	0–1	(Argentina) Lanús
	Report	Silva 26'

Estadio Gran Parque Central, Montevideo
Attendance: 20,000
Referee: Ulises Mereles (Paraguay)
23 May 2017
19:30 UTC−3

Chapecoense (Brazil)	2–1	(Venezuela) Zulia
Arthur 90'; Andrei Girotto 90+1'	Report	Arango 30'

Arena Condá, Chapecó
Attendance: 4,423
Referee: Gustavo Murillo (Colombia)

=== Group 8 ===
Pos	Team	Pld	W	D	L	GF	GA	GD	Pts	Qualification	GRE	GUA	DIQ	ZAM
1	(Brazil) Grêmio	6	4	1	1	15	6	+9	13	Round of 16	—	4–1	3–2	4–0
2	(Paraguay) Guaraní	6	3	2	1	9	7	+2	11	Round of 16	1–1	—	0–0	3–1
3	(Chile) Deportes Iquique	6	3	1	2	12	9	+3	10	Copa Sudamericana	2–1	0–1	—	4–3
4	(Venezuela) Zamora	6	0	0	6	6	20	−14	0		0–2	1–3	1–4	—

Source: CONMEBOL
7 March 2017
17:15 UTC−3

Deportes Iquique (Chile)	0–1	(Paraguay) Guaraní
	Report	Novick 82'

Estadio Zorros del Desierto, Calama
Attendance: 2,200
Referee: Raúl Orosco (Bolivia)
9 March 2017
18:30 UTC−4

Zamora (Venezuela)	0–2	(Brazil) Grêmio
	Report	Léo Moura 45'; Luan 51' (pen.)

Estadio Agustín Tovar, Barinas
Attendance: 18,000
Referee: Darío Herrera (Argentina)

11 April 2017
21:45 UTC−3

Grêmio (Brazil)	3–2	(Chile) Deportes Iquique
Luan 15', 23'; Bolaños 28' (pen.)	Report	R. Caroca 60'; Dávila 67'

Arena do Grêmio, Porto Alegre
Attendance: 30,343
Referee: Esteban Ostojich (Uruguay)
12 April 2017
18:30 UTC−4

Guaraní (Paraguay)	3–1	(Venezuela) Zamora
García 15'; Cabral 58'; Palau 90+2'	Report	Falcón 41'

Estadio Defensores del Chaco, Asunción
Attendance: 10,000
Referee: Néstor Pitana (Argentina)

19 April 2017
20:00 UTC−4

Zamora (Venezuela)	1–4	(Chile) Deportes Iquique
Pérez 79'	Report	Bielkiewicz 7' (pen.), 19'; Reynero 65'; Villalobos 86'

Estadio Agustín Tovar, Barinas
Attendance: 13,000
Referee: Michael Espinoza (Peru)
20 April 2017
18:30 UTC−4 (Note: The Guaraní v Grêmio match was originally scheduled on 20 April 2017, 20:45 local time, but was re-scheduled to 18:30 local time.)

Guaraní (Paraguay)	1–1	(Brazil) Grêmio
López 71'	Report	Pedro Rocha 78'

Estadio Defensores del Chaco, Asunción
Attendance: 9,000
Referee: Wilmar Roldán (Colombia)

25 April 2017
17:15 UTC−3

Deportes Iquique (Chile)	4–3	(Venezuela) Zamora
Ramos 13'; R. Caroca 81', 90+1'; Bielkiewicz 90+4'	Report	Clarke 49' (pen.); Gallardo 64'; Uribe 84'

Estadio Zorros del Desierto, Calama
Attendance: 4,000
Referee: Gery Vargas (Bolivia)
27 April 2017
21:45 UTC−3

Grêmio (Brazil)	4–1	(Paraguay) Guaraní
Barrios 7', 27', 78'; Pedro Geromel 45+3'	Report	Léo Moura 33' (o.g.)

Arena do Grêmio, Porto Alegre
Attendance: 21,300
Referee: Patricio Loustau (Argentina)

3 May 2017
19:30 UTC−3

Deportes Iquique (Chile)	2–1	(Brazil) Grêmio
Bielkiewicz 23' (pen.); Torres 48'	Report	Barrios 19'

Estadio Zorros del Desierto, Calama
Attendance: 3,000
Referee: Germán Delfino (Argentina)
4 May 2017
20:45 UTC−4

Zamora (Venezuela)	1–3	(Paraguay) Guaraní
Sosa 40'	Report	García 14', 51'; Palau 19'

Estadio Agustín Tovar, Barinas
Attendance: 1,500
Referee: Óscar Rojas (Uruguay)

25 May 2017
21:45 UTC−3

Grêmio (Brazil)	4–0	(Venezuela) Zamora
Luan 22', 28' (pen.); Barrios 25'; Pedro Rocha 63'	Report

Arena do Grêmio, Porto Alegre
Attendance: 22,435
Referee: Juan Albarracín (Ecuador)
25 May 2017
20:45 UTC−4

Guaraní (Paraguay)	0–0	(Chile) Deportes Iquique
	Report

Estadio Defensores del Chaco, Asunción
Attendance: 3,000
Referee: Fernando Rapallini (Argentina)
