= 2017 Copa Libertadores final stages =

The 2017 Copa Libertadores final stages were played from 4 July to 29 November 2017. A total of 16 teams competed in the final stages to decide the champions of the 2017 Copa Libertadores.

== Qualified teams ==
The winners and runners-up of each of the eight groups in the group stage advanced to the round of 16.

Group	Winners	Runners-up
1	(Brazil) Botafogo	(Ecuador) Barcelona
2	(Brazil) Santos	(Bolivia) The Strongest
3	(Argentina) River Plate	(Ecuador) Emelec
4	(Argentina) San Lorenzo	(Brazil) Atlético Paranaense
5	(Brazil) Palmeiras	(Bolivia) Jorge Wilstermann
6	(Brazil) Atlético Mineiro	(Argentina) Godoy Cruz
7	(Argentina) Lanús	(Uruguay) Nacional
8	(Brazil) Grêmio	(Paraguay) Guaraní

== Seeding ==
Starting from the round of 16, the teams were seeded according to their results in the group stage, with the group winners (Pot 1 in round of 16 draw) seeded 1–8, and the group runners-up (Pot 2 in round of 16 draw) seeded 9–16.

Seed	Grp	Team	Pld	W	D	L	GF	GA	GD	Pts	Round of 16 draw
1	6	(Brazil) Atlético Mineiro	6	4	1	1	17	6	+11	13	Pot 1
2	7	(Argentina) Lanús	6	4	1	1	13	3	+10	13	Pot 1
3	8	(Brazil) Grêmio	6	4	1	1	15	6	+9	13	Pot 1
4	3	(Argentina) River Plate	6	4	1	1	14	9	+5	13	Pot 1
5	5	(Brazil) Palmeiras	6	4	1	1	13	9	+4	13	Pot 1
6	2	(Brazil) Santos	6	3	3	0	11	4	+7	12	Pot 1
7	1	(Brazil) Botafogo	6	3	1	2	6	5	+1	10	Pot 1
8	4	(Argentina) San Lorenzo	6	3	1	2	8	8	0	10	Pot 1
9	6	(Argentina) Godoy Cruz	6	3	2	1	10	8	+2	11	Pot 2
10	8	(Paraguay) Guaraní	6	3	2	1	9	7	+2	11	Pot 2
11	3	(Ecuador) Emelec	6	3	1	2	8	5	+3	10	Pot 2
12	1	(Ecuador) Barcelona	6	3	1	2	8	8	0	10	Pot 2
13	4	(Brazil) Atlético Paranaense	6	3	1	2	9	10	−1	10	Pot 2
14	2	(Bolivia) The Strongest	6	2	3	1	9	5	+4	9	Pot 2
15	5	(Bolivia) Jorge Wilstermann	6	3	0	3	12	10	+2	9	Pot 2
16	7	(Uruguay) Nacional	6	2	2	2	5	3	+2	8	Pot 2

Source: CONMEBOL
Rules for classification: 1) Higher position in group; 2) Points; 3) Goal difference; 4) Goals scored; 5) Away goals scored; 6) CONMEBOL ranking (Regulations Article 3.8h).

== Format ==
Starting from the round of 16, the teams played a single-elimination tournament with the following rules:

- Each tie was played on a home-and-away two-legged basis, with the higher-seeded team hosting the second leg (Regulations Article 3.10).
- In the round of 16, quarterfinals, and semifinals, if tied on aggregate, the away goals rule would be used. If still tied, extra time would not be played, and the penalty shoot-out would be used to determine the winner (Regulations Article 5.2).
- In the finals, if tied on aggregate, the away goals rule would not be used, and 30 minutes of extra time would be played. If still tied after extra time, the penalty shoot-out would be used to determine the winner (Regulations Article 5.3).

There were two format changes from the previous season:

- While the seeding was still used to decide the order of legs, it was no longer used to decide the bracket, which was decided by the round of 16 draw.
- If there were two semifinalists from the same association, the bracket was no longer adjusted and remained as it was.

== Draw ==
The draw for the round of 16 was held on 14 June 2017, 20:00 PYT (UTC−4), at the CONMEBOL Convention Center in Luque, Paraguay. For the round of 16, the 16 teams were drawn into eight ties (A–H) between a group winner (Pot 1) and a group runner-up (Pot 2), with the group winners hosting the second leg. Teams from the same association or the same group could be drawn into the same tie.

== Bracket ==
The bracket starting from the round of 16 was determined as follows:

Round	Matchups
Round of 16	(Group winners host second leg, matchups decided by draw): Match A; Match B; Match C; Match D; Match E; Match F; Match G; Match H
Quarterfinals	(Higher-seeded team host second leg): Match S1: Winner A vs. Winner H; Match S2: Winner B vs. Winner G; Match S3: Winner C vs. Winner F; Match S4: Winner D vs. Winner E
Semifinals	(Higher-seeded team host second leg): Match F1: Winner S1 vs. Winner S4; Match F2: Winner S2 vs. Winner S3
Finals	(Higher-seeded team host second leg): Winner F1 vs. Winner F2

The bracket was decided based on the round of 16 draw, which was held on 14 June 2017.

Round of 16
12	(Ecuador) Barcelona (p)	1	0	1 (5)
5	(Brazil) Palmeiras	0	1	1 (4)
13	(Brazil) Atlético Paranaense	2	0	2
6	(Brazil) Santos	3	1	4
16	(Uruguay) Nacional	0	0	0
7	(Brazil) Botafogo	1	2	3
9	(Argentina) Godoy Cruz	0	1	1
3	(Brazil) Grêmio	1	2	3
15	(Bolivia) Jorge Wilstermann	1	0	1
1	(Brazil) Atlético Mineiro	0	0	0
10	(Paraguay) Guaraní	0	1	1
4	(Argentina) River Plate	2	1	3
11	(Ecuador) Emelec	0	1	1 (4)
8	(Argentina) San Lorenzo (p)	1	0	1 (5)
14	(Bolivia) The Strongest	1	0	1
2	(Argentina) Lanús	1	1	2

Quarterfinals
12	(Ecuador) Barcelona	1	1	2
6	(Brazil) Santos	1	0	1
7	(Brazil) Botafogo	0	0	0
3	(Brazil) Grêmio	0	1	1
15	(Bolivia) Jorge Wilstermann	3	0	3
4	(Argentina) River Plate	0	8	8
8	(Argentina) San Lorenzo	2	0	2 (3)
2	(Argentina) Lanús (p)	0	2	2 (4)

Semifinals
12	(Ecuador) Barcelona	0	1	1
3	(Brazil) Grêmio	3	0	3
4	(Argentina) River Plate	1	2	3
2	(Argentina) Lanús	0	4	4

Finals
3	(Brazil) Grêmio	1	2	3
2	(Argentina) Lanús	0	1	1

== Round of 16 ==
The first legs were played on 4–6 July, and the second legs were played on 8–10 August 2017.

Team 1	Agg.	Team 2	1st leg	2nd leg
Guaraní (Paraguay)	1–3	(Argentina) River Plate	0–2	1–1
Atlético Paranaense (Brazil)	2–4	(Brazil) Santos	2–3	0–1
Nacional (Uruguay)	0–3	(Brazil) Botafogo	0–1	0–2
Emelec (Ecuador)	1–1 (4–5 p)	(Argentina) San Lorenzo	0–1	1–0
The Strongest (Bolivia)	1–2	(Argentina) Lanús	1–1	0–1
Godoy Cruz (Argentina)	1–3	(Brazil) Grêmio	0–1	1–2
Barcelona (Ecuador)	1–1 (5–4 p)	(Brazil) Palmeiras	1–0	0–1
Jorge Wilstermann (Bolivia)	1–0	(Brazil) Atlético Mineiro	1–0	0–0

=== Match A ===
4 July 2017
20:45 UTC−4

Guaraní (Paraguay)	0–2	(Argentina) River Plate
	Report	Scocco 36'; Larrondo 87'

Estadio Defensores del Chaco, Asunción
Attendance: 15,000
Referee: Andrés Cunha (Uruguay)

8 August 2017
21:45 UTC−3

River Plate (Argentina)	1–1	(Paraguay) Guaraní
Pinola 51'	Report	Palau 45+1'

Estadio Monumental Antonio Vespucio Liberti, Buenos Aires
Attendance: 50,000
Referee: Roddy Zambrano (Ecuador)

River Plate won 3–1 on aggregate and advanced to the quarterfinals (Match S1).

=== Match B ===
5 July 2017
19:15 UTC−3

Atlético Paranaense (Brazil)	2–3	(Brazil) Santos
Nikão 6'; Éderson 71'	Report	Kayke 24', 67'; Bruno Henrique 56'

Estadio Durival de Britto e Silva, Curitiba
Attendance: 13,770
Referee: Roberto Tobar (Chile)

10 August 2017
21:45 UTC−3

Santos (Brazil)	1–0	(Brazil) Atlético Paranaense
Bruno Henrique 77'	Report

Estádio Urbano Caldeira, Santos
Attendance: 12,380
Referee: Mauro Vigliano (Argentina)

Santos won 4–2 on aggregate and advanced to the quarterfinals (Match S2).

=== Match C ===
6 July 2017
21:45 UTC−3

Nacional (Uruguay)	0–1	(Brazil) Botafogo
	Report	João Paulo 37'

Estadio Gran Parque Central, Montevideo
Attendance: 12,000
Referee: Julio Bascuñán (Chile)

10 August 2017
19:15 UTC−3

Botafogo (Brazil)	2–0	(Uruguay) Nacional
Bruno Silva 2'; Rodrigo Pimpão 5'	Report

Estádio Olímpico Nilton Santos, Rio de Janeiro
Attendance: 40,050
Referee: Wilmar Roldán (Colombia)

Botafogo won 3–0 on aggregate and advanced to the quarterfinals (Match S3).

=== Match D ===
6 July 2017
19:45 UTC−5

Emelec (Ecuador)	0–1	(Argentina) San Lorenzo
	Report	Belluschi 24'

Estadio George Capwell, Guayaquil
Attendance: 28,000
Referee: Wilson Lamouroux (Colombia)

10 August 2017
21:45 UTC−3

San Lorenzo (Argentina)	0–1	(Ecuador) Emelec
	Report	Lastra 47'
Penalties
Blandi (penalty scored); Caruzzo (penalty scored); Angeleri (penalty scored); Gudiño (penalty scored); Belluschi (penalty missed); Reniero (penalty scored)	5–4	(penalty scored) Gaibor; (penalty scored) Preciado; (penalty missed) Luna; (penalty scored) Píriz; (penalty scored) Caicedo; (penalty missed) Ramos

Estadio Pedro Bidegain, Buenos Aires
Attendance: 25,000
Referee: Wilton Sampaio (Brazil)

Tied 1–1 on aggregate, San Lorenzo won on penalties and advanced to the quarterfinals (Match S4).

=== Match E ===
6 July 2017
18:15 UTC−4

The Strongest (Bolivia)	1–1	(Argentina) Lanús
D. Bejarano 90+1'	Report	Pasquini 36'

Estadio Hernando Siles, La Paz
Attendance: 28,000
Referee: Wilton Sampaio (Brazil)

8 August 2017
19:15 UTC−3

Lanús (Argentina)	1–0	(Bolivia) The Strongest
Sand 84'	Report

Estadio Ciudad de Lanús, Lanús
Attendance: 14,000
Referee: Andrés Cunha (Uruguay)

Lanús won 2–1 on aggregate and advanced to the quarterfinals (Match S4).

=== Match F ===
4 July 2017
19:15 UTC−3

Godoy Cruz (Argentina)	0–1	(Brazil) Grêmio
	Report	Ramiro 1'

Estadio Malvinas Argentinas, Mendoza
Attendance: 17,000
Referee: Víctor Carrillo (Peru)

9 August 2017
19:15 UTC−3

Grêmio (Brazil)	2–1	(Argentina) Godoy Cruz
Pedro Rocha 28', 58'	Report	J. Correa 13'

Arena do Grêmio, Porto Alegre
Attendance: 38,797
Referee: Enrique Cáceres (Paraguay)

Grêmio won 3–1 on aggregate and advanced to the quarterfinals (Match S3).

=== Match G ===
5 July 2017
19:45 UTC−5

Barcelona (Ecuador)	1–0	(Brazil) Palmeiras
Álvez 90+1'	Report

Estadio Monumental Isidro Romero Carbo, Guayaquil
Attendance: 33,118
Referee: Patricio Loustau (Argentina)

9 August 2017
21:45 UTC−3

Palmeiras (Brazil)	1–0	(Ecuador) Barcelona
Moisés 50'	Report
Penalties
Guerra (penalty scored); Tchê Tchê (penalty scored); Bruno Henrique (penalty missed); Keno (penalty scored); Moisés (penalty scored); Egídio (penalty missed)	4–5	(penalty scored) Álvez; (penalty scored) M. Oyola; (penalty scored) S. Castillo; (penalty scored) M. Caicedo; (penalty missed) Díaz; (penalty scored) Ayoví

Allianz Parque, São Paulo
Attendance: 38,310
Referee: Néstor Pitana (Argentina)

Tied 1–1 on aggregate, Barcelona won on penalties and advanced to the quarterfinals (Match S2).

=== Match H ===
5 July 2017
20:45 UTC−4

Jorge Wilstermann (Bolivia)	1–0	(Brazil) Atlético Mineiro
Álvarez 40'	Report

Estadio Félix Capriles, Cochabamba
Attendance: 25,000
Referee: Daniel Fedorczuk (Uruguay)

9 August 2017
21:45 UTC−3

Atlético Mineiro (Brazil)	0–0	(Bolivia) Jorge Wilstermann
	Report

Estádio Mineirão, Belo Horizonte
Attendance: 36,018
Referee: José Argote (Venezuela)

Jorge Wilstermann won 1–0 on aggregate and advanced to the quarterfinals (Match S1).

== Quarterfinals ==
The first legs were played on 13–14 September, and the second legs were played on 20–21 September 2017.

Team 1	Agg.	Team 2	1st leg	2nd leg
Jorge Wilstermann (Bolivia)	3–8	(Argentina) River Plate	3–0	0–8
Barcelona (Ecuador)	2–1	(Brazil) Santos	1–1	1–0
Botafogo (Brazil)	0–1	(Brazil) Grêmio	0–0	0–1
San Lorenzo (Argentina)	2–2 (3–4 p)	(Argentina) Lanús	2–0	0–2

=== Match S1 ===
14 September 2017
20:45 UTC−4

Jorge Wilstermann (Bolivia)	3–0	(Argentina) River Plate
Zenteno 4'; Álvarez 50'; Machado 81'	Report

Estadio Félix Capriles, Cochabamba
Attendance: 27,000
Referee: Sandro Ricci (Brazil)

21 September 2017
19:15 UTC−3

River Plate (Argentina)	8–0	(Bolivia) Jorge Wilstermann
Scocco 8', 13', 19', 46', 57'; Pérez 35', 66'; I. Fernández 52'	Report

Estadio Monumental Antonio Vespucio Liberti, Buenos Aires
Attendance: 55,000
Referee: Julio Bascuñán (Chile)

River Plate won 8–3 on aggregate and advanced to the semifinals (Match F1).

=== Match S2 ===
13 September 2017
19:45 UTC−5

Barcelona (Ecuador)	1–1	(Brazil) Santos
Álvez 78'	Report	Bruno Henrique 46'

Estadio Monumental Isidro Romero Carbo, Guayaquil
Attendance: 30,747
Referee: Daniel Fedorczuk (Uruguay)

20 September 2017
21:45 UTC−3

Santos (Brazil)	0–1	(Ecuador) Barcelona
	Report	Álvez 67'

Estádio Urbano Caldeira, Santos
Attendance: 12,730
Referee: Víctor Carrillo (Peru)

Barcelona won 2–1 on aggregate and advanced to the semifinals (Match F2).

=== Match S3 ===
13 September 2017
21:45 UTC−3

Botafogo (Brazil)	0–0	(Brazil) Grêmio
	Report

Estádio Olímpico Nilton Santos, Rio de Janeiro
Attendance: 36,034
Referee: José Argote (Venezuela)

20 September 2017
21:45 UTC−3

Grêmio (Brazil)	1–0	(Brazil) Botafogo
Barrios 62'	Report

Arena do Grêmio, Porto Alegre
Attendance: 50,517
Referee: Patricio Loustau (Argentina)

Grêmio won 1–0 on aggregate and advanced to the semifinals (Match F2).

=== Match S4 ===
13 September 2017
19:15 UTC−3

San Lorenzo (Argentina)	2–0	(Argentina) Lanús
Blandi 33', 50' (pen.)	Report

Estadio Pedro Bidegain, Buenos Aires
Attendance: 30,000
Referee: Wilmar Roldán (Colombia)

21 September 2017
21:45 UTC−3

Lanús (Argentina)	2–0	(Argentina) San Lorenzo
Sand 10'; Pasquini 15'	Report
Penalties
Silva (penalty scored); Pasquini (penalty scored); Braghieri (penalty scored); Acosta (penalty scored)	4–3	(penalty scored) Belluschi; (penalty missed) Caruzzo; (penalty scored) Rodríguez; (penalty scored) Botta; (penalty missed) Blandi

Estadio Ciudad de Lanús, Lanús
Attendance: 15,000
Referee: Enrique Cáceres (Paraguay)

Tied 2–2 on aggregate, Lanús won on penalties and advanced to the semifinals (Match F1).

== Semifinals ==
The first legs were played on 24–25 October, and the second legs were played on 31 October and 1 November 2017.

Team 1	Agg.	Team 2	1st leg	2nd leg
River Plate (Argentina)	3–4	(Argentina) Lanús	1–0	2–4
Barcelona (Ecuador)	1–3	(Brazil) Grêmio	0–3	1–0

=== Match F1 ===
24 October 2017
19:15 UTC−3

River Plate (Argentina)	1–0	(Argentina) Lanús
Scocco 81'	Report

Estadio Monumental Antonio Vespucio Liberti, Buenos Aires
Attendance: 55,000
Referee: Wilton Sampaio (Brazil)

31 October 2017
21:15 UTC−3

Lanús (Argentina)	4–2	(Argentina) River Plate
Sand 45', 46'; Acosta 61'; Silva 68' (pen.)	Report	Scocco 17' (pen.); Montiel 22'

Estadio Ciudad de Lanús, Lanús
Attendance: 30,000
Referee: Wilmar Roldán (Colombia)

Lanús won 4–3 on aggregate and advanced to the finals.

=== Match F2 ===
25 October 2017
18:45 UTC−5

Barcelona (Ecuador)	0–3	(Brazil) Grêmio
	Report	Luan 7', 50'; Edílson 20'

Estadio Monumental Isidro Romero Carbo, Guayaquil
Attendance: 52,500
Referee: Néstor Pitana (Argentina)

1 November 2017
21:45 UTC−2

Grêmio (Brazil)	0–1	(Ecuador) Barcelona
	Report	Álvez 32'

Arena do Grêmio, Porto Alegre
Attendance: 54,128
Referee: Roberto Tobar (Chile)

Grêmio won 3–1 on aggregate and advanced to the finals.

== Finals ==
In the finals, if tied on aggregate, the away goals rule would not be used, and 30 minutes of extra time would be played. If still tied after extra time, the penalty shoot-out would be used to determine the winner (Regulations Article 5.3).

The first leg was played on 22 November, and the second leg was played on 29 November 2017.

22 November 2017
21:45 UTC−2

Grêmio (Brazil)	1–0	(Argentina) Lanús
Cícero 82'	Report

Arena do Grêmio, Porto Alegre
Attendance: 55,188
Referee: Julio Bascuñán (Chile)

29 November 2017
20:45 UTC−3

Lanús (Argentina)	1–2	(Brazil) Grêmio
Sand 71' (pen.)	Report	Fernandinho 26'; Luan 41'

Estadio Ciudad de Lanús, Lanús
Attendance: 45,000
Referee: Enrique Cáceres (Paraguay)

Grêmio won 3–1 on aggregate.
