= 2017 Peñarol season =

Peñarol
2017 season
- Club Atlético Peñarol's crest
- President: (Uruguay) Juan Pedro Damiani
- Manager: (Uruguay) Leonardo Ramos
- Stadium: Campeón del Siglo; Montevideo, Uruguay
- Primera División: tbd
- Copa CONMEBOL Libertadores: tbd
- Top goalscorer: League: (Uruguay) Nahitan Nández (4 goals) (Canada) Lucas Cavallini (4 goals) (Uruguay) Junior Arias (4 goals); All: (Uruguay) Nahitan Nández (4 goals) (Canada) Lucas Cavallini (4 goals) (Uruguay) Mauricio Affonso (4 goals) (Uruguay) Junior Arias (4 goals) (Uruguay) Gastón Rodríguez (4 goals)
- Biggest win: 4-0 (Primera División) vs. El Tanque Sisley, Montevideo Wanderers, Sud América
- Biggest defeat: 6-2 (Copa CONMEBOL Libertadores) vs. Jorge Wilstermann
Home colours	Away colours	Alternative colours

The 2017 Uruguayan Primera División season is Peñarol's 117th consecutive season in the top-flight of Uruguayan football, and 126th year in existence as a football club. They entered this season looking to rebound from a disappointing 2016 season, when they finished 14th in the table. The season covers the period from 5 February 2017 to the end of the same year, marking the transition from a biannual season to an annual season.

== Squad ==
=== Transfers ===
==== In ====
No.	Pos.	Player	Previous club	Type of Transfer	Reference
23	FW	(Uruguay) Mauricio Affonso	(Uruguay) Racing Club de Montevideo	End of Loan	
	FW	(Uruguay) Octavio Colo	(Uruguay) Racing Club de Montevideo	End of Loan	
	FW	(Uruguay) Gabriel Leyes	(Uruguay) Plaza Colonia	End of Loan	
	DF	(Uruguay) Fabrizio Buschiazzo	(Argentina) Defensa y Justicia	End of Loan	
	GK	(Uruguay) Washington Aguerre	(Uruguay) Cerro Largo F.C.	End of Loan	
21	DF	(Uruguay) Ramón Arias	(Ecuador) Liga de Quito	Transfer	
19	FW	(Canada) Lucas Cavallini	(Uruguay) C.A. Fénix	Transfer	
12	GK	(Uruguay) Kevin Dawson	(Uruguay) Plaza Colonia	Loan	
27	DF	(Uruguay) Lucas Hernández	(Uruguay) C.A. Cerro	Loan	
24	DF	(Paraguay) Iván Villalba	(Paraguay) Rubio Ñú	Loan	
10	MF	(Uruguay) Matías Mier	(Qatar) Muaither SC	Free	
7	MF	(Uruguay) Cristian Rodríguez	(Argentina) C.A. Independiente	Free	
3	CB	(Brazil) Ronaldo Conceição	(Brazil) Atlético Minero	Free	

== Competitions ==
=== Copa CONMEBOL Libertadores ===
Peñarol qualified for the 2017 Copa Libertadores group stage after becoming champion of the 2015-16 Primera División. The club entered sorting from Pot 1 as Uruguay 1.

==== Group stage ====
Pos	Team	Pld	W	D	L	GF	GA	GD	Pts	Qualification
1	(Brazil) Palmeiras	6	4	1	1	13	9	+4	13	Round of 16
2	(Bolivia) Jorge Wilstermann	6	3	0	3	12	10	+2	9	Round of 16
3	(Argentina) Atlético Tucumán	6	2	1	3	8	10	−2	7	Copa Sudamericana
4	(Uruguay) Peñarol	6	2	0	4	11	15	−4	6	

Source: CONMEBOL
