= Nicolás Dibble =

Uruguayan footballer (born 1994)

Personal information
- Full name: Nicolás Ecequiel Dibble Aristimuño
- Date of birth: 27 May 1994 (age 32)
- Place of birth: Colonia del Sacramento, Uruguay
- Height: 1.76 m (5 ft 9 1/2 in)
- Position: Forward

Team information
- Current team: Olimpia
- Number: 31

Youth career
- Peñarol Colonia
- Plaza Colonia
- Juventud Colonia
- Nacional Nueva Helvecia
- Defensor Sporting
- Plaza Colonia

Senior career*
Years	Team	Apps	(Gls)
2013–2023	Plaza Colonia	204	(22)
2016–2017	→ Peñarol (loan)	27	(5)
2017–2018	→ Gimnasia LP (loan)	22	(1)
2023	→ Vitória (loan)	5	(1)
2024–2026	Rampla Juniors	21	(2)
2026–	Olimpia	0	(0)
- * Club domestic league appearances and goals as of 10 September 2026

Nicolás Ecequiel Dibble Aristimuño (born 27 May 1994) is a Uruguayan professional footballer who plays as a forward for Olimpia.

== Career ==
Dibble had various youth clubs, he started with Peñarol which came before spells with Plaza Colonia, Juventud, Nacional de Montevideo, Nacional de Nueva Helvecia and Defensor Sporting prior to rejoining Plaza Colonia. He made his professional football debut in 2013 with Plaza Colonia in the Uruguayan Segunda División, making his bow in a 1–1 draw with Deportivo Maldonado on 12 October. Twenty-six more appearances followed in 2013–14, prior to fifty in 2014–15 and 2015–16. In 2014–15, Dibble scored four goals, including his first against Rocha in December 2014, in a season that ended with promotion.

In July 2016, Dibble joined ex-youth club Peñarol on loan. He scored on his debut in a 2–0 victory over Fénix. He went on to feature twenty-five more times and scored four further goals. On 23 August 2017, Dibble was loaned to Argentine Primera División side Gimnasia y Esgrima. His first Gimnasia y Esgrima goal arrived on 29 October in a 4–0 win at home to Vélez Sarsfield.

== Career statistics ==
As of 13 May 2019.

Club statistics
Club	Season	League			Cup		Continental		Other		Total	
Club	Season	Division	Apps	Goals	Apps	Goals	Apps	Goals	Apps	Goals	Apps	Goals
Plaza Colonia	2013–14	Segunda División	24	0	—		—		3 (Note: Appearance(s) in the Segunda División play-offs)	0	27	0
Plaza Colonia	2014–15	Segunda División	21	4	—		—		0	0	21	4
Plaza Colonia	2015–16	Uruguayan Primera División	28	3	—		—		1 (Note: Appearance(s) in the Uruguayan Primera División play-offs)	0	29	3
Plaza Colonia	2016	Uruguayan Primera División	0	0	—		0	0	0	0	0	0
Plaza Colonia	2017	Uruguayan Primera División	0	0	—		—		0	0	0	0
Plaza Colonia	2018	Segunda División	11	0	—		—		0	0	11	0
Plaza Colonia	2019	Uruguayan Primera División	7	1	—		—		0	0	7	1
Plaza Colonia	Total		91	8	—		0	0	4	0	95	8
Peñarol (loan)	2016	Uruguayan Primera División	11	3	—		2 (Note: Appearance(s) in the Copa Sudamericana)	0	0	0	13	3
Peñarol (loan)	2017	Uruguayan Primera División	15	2	—		3 (Note: Appearance(s) in the Copa Libertadores)	0	0	0	18	2
Peñarol (loan)	Total		26	5	—		5	0	0	0	31	5
Gimnasia y Esgrima (loan)	2017–18	Argentine Primera División	22	1	0	0	—		0	0	22	1
Career total			139	14	0	0	5	0	4	0	148	14
