= Fernando Luna =

Fernando Luna may refer to:

- Fernando Luna (tennis) (born 1958), tennis player from Spain
- Fernando Luna (rugby union) (born 1990), Argentine rugby sevens player
- Fernando Luna (footballer) (born 1990), Argentine footballer
