= 2017 Copa Libertadores =

58th season of Copa Libertadores

Copa CONMEBOL Libertadores Bridgestone 2017

Tournament details
- Dates: 23 January – 29 November 2017
- Teams: 47 (from 10 associations)

Final positions
- Champions: (Brazil) Grêmio (3rd title)
- Runners-up: (Argentina) Lanús

Tournament statistics
- Matches played: 156
- Goals scored: 426 (2.73 per match)
- Top scorer: (Argentina) José Sand (9 goals)
- Best player: (Brazil) Luan

The 2017 Copa CONMEBOL Libertadores (officially the Copa CONMEBOL Libertadores Bridgestone 2017 for sponsorship reasons) was the 58th edition of the CONMEBOL Libertadores (also referred to as the Copa Libertadores), South America's premier club football tournament organized by CONMEBOL.

Grêmio defeated Lanús in the finals by an aggregate score of 3–1 to win their third tournament title. As champions, they qualified as the CONMEBOL representative at the 2017 FIFA Club World Cup in the United Arab Emirates, and also earned the right to play against the winners of the 2017 Copa Sudamericana in the 2018 Recopa Sudamericana. They also automatically qualified for the 2018 Copa Libertadores group stage.

Atlético Nacional were the defending champions, but they were eliminated in the group stage.

== Format changes ==
Starting from this season, the following format changes were implemented:

- The tournament was expanded from 38 to 47 teams.
- A total of ten teams eliminated from the Copa Libertadores (two best teams eliminated in the third stage of qualifying and eight third-placed teams in the group stage) were transferred to the Copa Sudamericana.
- The schedule of the tournament was extended to year-round so it would start in late January or early February and conclude in late November or early December.

Although CONMEBOL proposed to change the format of the final to be played as a single match at a venue to be chosen in advance, they later decided to keep the two-legged home-and-away format.

On 18 November 2016, the Liga MX president Enrique Bonilla announced that teams from Mexico would not participate in the 2017 Copa Libertadores due to the format change which put it in conflict with the Mexican league schedule. However, he left open the possibility of a return as soon as 2018 if a solution was found.

Initially CONMEBOL announced that the tournament would be expanded from 38 to 44 teams, and the additional six berths would be distributed to the Copa Sudamericana champions (which no longer occupy one of the places allocated to their association and are now allocated an additional berth), two to Brazil, and one each to Argentina, Chile and Colombia, based on commercial and sporting criteria. Following the withdrawal of teams from Mexico, CONMEBOL announced that the other six associations (Bolivia, Ecuador, Paraguay, Peru, Uruguay and Venezuela) would also be each allocated an additional berth, further expanding the tournament to 47 teams.

From this season, the Copa Libertadores champions (which no longer occupy one of the group stage places allocated to their association) and the Copa Sudamericana champions gained direct entries into the group stage, meaning a total of 28 teams (increased from 26) would directly enter the group stage, while the other four berths (decreased from six) would be decided by the qualifying stages. The group stage berths left vacant following the withdrawal of teams from Mexico would be redistributed to Argentina and Brazil. For the qualifying stages, a total of 19 teams (increased from 12) competed in three rounds where the four winners advanced to the group stage (initially 16 teams would compete in two rounds before further expansion following the withdrawal of teams from Mexico).

== Teams ==
The following 47 teams from the 10 CONMEBOL member associations qualified for the tournament:

- Copa Libertadores champions
- Copa Sudamericana champions
- Brazil: 7 berths
- Argentina: 6 berths
- All other associations: 4 berths each

The entry stage was determined as follows:

- Group stage: 28 teams
  - Copa Libertadores champions
  - Copa Sudamericana champions
  - Teams which qualified for berths 1–5 from Argentina and Brazil
  - Teams which qualified for berths 1–2 from all other associations
- Second stage: 13 teams
  - Teams which qualified for berths 6–7 from Brazil
  - Team which qualified for berth 6 from Argentina
  - Teams which qualified for berths 3–4 from Chile and Colombia
  - Teams which qualified for berths 3 from all other associations
- First stage: 6 teams
  - Teams which qualified for berths 4 from Bolivia, Ecuador, Paraguay, Peru, Uruguay and Venezuela

| Association | Team (Berth) | Entry stage | Qualification method |
|---|---|---|---|
| (Argentina) Argentina; 6 berths | Lanús (Argentina 1) | Group stage | 2016 Primera División champions |
| (Argentina) Argentina; 6 berths | San Lorenzo (Argentina 2) | Group stage | 2016 Primera División runners-up |
| (Argentina) Argentina; 6 berths | Estudiantes (Argentina 3) | Group stage | 2016 Primera División 3rd place |
| (Argentina) Argentina; 6 berths | Godoy Cruz (Argentina 4) | Group stage | 2016 Primera División 4th place |
| (Argentina) Argentina; 6 berths | River Plate (Argentina 5) | Group stage | 2015–16 Copa Argentina champions |
| (Argentina) Argentina; 6 berths | Atlético Tucumán (Argentina 6) | Second stage | 2016 Primera División 5th place |
| (Bolivia) Bolivia; 4 berths | Sport Boys (Bolivia 1) | Group stage | 2015 Apertura champions |
| (Bolivia) Bolivia; 4 berths | Jorge Wilstermann (Bolivia 2) | Group stage | 2016 Clausura champions |
| (Bolivia) Bolivia; 4 berths | The Strongest (Bolivia 3) | Second stage | 2015–16 Primera División aggregate table best team not yet qualified |
| (Bolivia) Bolivia; 4 berths | Universitario de Sucre (Bolivia 4) | First stage | 2015–16 Primera División aggregate table 2nd best team not yet qualified |
| (Brazil) Brazil; 7 + 1 berths | Chapecoense (Brazil 1; Copa Sudamericana) | Group stage | 2016 Copa Sudamericana champions |
| (Brazil) Brazil; 7 + 1 berths | Palmeiras (Brazil 2) | Group stage | 2016 Campeonato Brasileiro Série A champions |
| (Brazil) Brazil; 7 + 1 berths | Grêmio (Brazil 3) | Group stage | 2016 Copa do Brasil champions |
| (Brazil) Brazil; 7 + 1 berths | Santos (Brazil 4) | Group stage | 2016 Campeonato Brasileiro Série A runners-up |
| (Brazil) Brazil; 7 + 1 berths | Flamengo (Brazil 5) | Group stage | 2016 Campeonato Brasileiro Série A 3rd place |
| (Brazil) Brazil; 7 + 1 berths | Atlético Mineiro (Brazil 6) | Group stage | 2016 Campeonato Brasileiro Série A 4th place |
| (Brazil) Brazil; 7 + 1 berths | Botafogo (Brazil 7) | Second stage | 2016 Campeonato Brasileiro Série A 5th place |
| (Brazil) Brazil; 7 + 1 berths | Atlético Paranaense (Brazil 8) | Second stage | 2016 Campeonato Brasileiro Série A 6th place |
| (Chile) Chile; 4 berths | Universidad Católica (Chile 1) | Group stage | 2016 Clausura champions |
| (Chile) Chile; 4 berths | Deportes Iquique (Chile 2) | Group stage | 2016 Apertura runners-up |
| (Chile) Chile; 4 berths | Colo-Colo (Chile 3) | Second stage | 2016 Copa Chile champions |
| (Chile) Chile; 4 berths | Unión Española (Chile 4) | Second stage | 2016 Primera División runners-up playoff winners |
| (Colombia) Colombia; 4 + 1 berths | Atlético Nacional (Colombia 1; Title holders) | Group stage | 2016 Copa Libertadores champions |
| (Colombia) Colombia; 4 + 1 berths | Independiente Medellín (Colombia 2) | Group stage | 2016 Apertura champions |
| (Colombia) Colombia; 4 + 1 berths | Santa Fe (Colombia 3) | Group stage | 2016 Finalización champions |
| (Colombia) Colombia; 4 + 1 berths | Millonarios (Colombia 4) | Second stage | 2016 Primera A aggregate table best team not yet qualified |
| (Colombia) Colombia; 4 + 1 berths | Junior (Colombia 5) | Second stage | 2016 Primera A aggregate table 2nd best team not yet qualified |
| (Ecuador) Ecuador; 4 berths | Barcelona (Ecuador 1) | Group stage | 2016 Serie A champions |
| (Ecuador) Ecuador; 4 berths | Emelec (Ecuador 2) | Group stage | 2016 Serie A runners-up |
| (Ecuador) Ecuador; 4 berths | El Nacional (Ecuador 3) | Second stage | 2016 Serie A aggregate table best team not yet qualified |
| (Ecuador) Ecuador; 4 berths | Independiente del Valle (Ecuador 4) | First stage | 2016 Serie A aggregate table 2nd best team not yet qualified |
| (Paraguay) Paraguay; 4 berths | Libertad (Paraguay 1) | Group stage | 2016 Primera División tournament champions with better record in aggregate table |
| (Paraguay) Paraguay; 4 berths | Guaraní (Paraguay 2) | Group stage | 2016 Primera División tournament champions with worse record in aggregate table |
| (Paraguay) Paraguay; 4 berths | Olimpia (Paraguay 3) | Second stage | 2016 Primera División aggregate table best team not yet qualified |
| (Paraguay) Paraguay; 4 berths | Deportivo Capiatá (Paraguay 4) | First stage | 2016 Primera División aggregate table 2nd best team not yet qualified |
| (Peru) Peru; 4 berths | Sporting Cristal (Peru 1) | Group stage | 2016 Descentralizado champions |
| (Peru) Peru; 4 berths | Melgar (Peru 2) | Group stage | 2016 Descentralizado runners-up |
| (Peru) Peru; 4 berths | Universitario (Peru 3) | Second stage | 2016 Descentralizado 3rd place |
| (Peru) Peru; 4 berths | Deportivo Municipal (Peru 4) | First stage | 2016 Descentralizado 4th place |
| (Uruguay) Uruguay; 4 berths | Peñarol (Uruguay 1) | Group stage | 2015–16 Primera División champions |
| (Uruguay) Uruguay; 4 berths | Nacional (Uruguay 2) | Group stage | 2015–16 Primera División runners-up |
| (Uruguay) Uruguay; 4 berths | Cerro (Uruguay 3) | Second stage | 2015–16 Primera División aggregate table best team not yet qualified |
| (Uruguay) Uruguay; 4 berths | Montevideo Wanderers (Uruguay 4) | First stage | 2016 Primera División best team not yet qualified |
| (Venezuela) Venezuela; 4 berths | Zamora (Venezuela 1) | Group stage | 2016 Primera División champions |
| (Venezuela) Venezuela; 4 berths | Zulia (Venezuela 2) | Group stage | 2016 Primera División runners-up |
| (Venezuela) Venezuela; 4 berths | Carabobo (Venezuela 3) | Second stage | 2016 Primera División aggregate table best team not yet qualified |
| (Venezuela) Venezuela; 4 berths | Deportivo Táchira (Venezuela 4) | First stage | 2016 Primera División aggregate table 2nd best team not yet qualified |

== Schedule ==
The schedule of the competition was as follows. The first stage matches were played on Monday and Friday, instead of the usual midweek of Tuesday, Wednesday or Thursday.

| Stage | Draw date | First leg | Second leg |
|---|---|---|---|
| First stage | 21 December 2016 (Luque, Paraguay) | 23 January 2017 | 27 January 2017 |
| Second stage | 21 December 2016 (Luque, Paraguay) | 31 January – 2 February 2017 | 7–9 February 2017 |
| Third stage | 21 December 2016 (Luque, Paraguay) | 14–16 February 2017 | 21–23 February 2017 |
| Group stage | 21 December 2016 (Luque, Paraguay) | Week 1: 7–9 March 2017; Week 2: 14–16 March 2017; Week 3: 11–13 April 2017; Week 4: 18–20 April 2017; Week 5: 25–27 April 2017; Week 6: 2–4 May 2017; Week 7: 16–18 May 2017; Week 8: 23–25 May 2017 | |
| Round of 16 | 14 June 2017 (Luque, Paraguay) | 4–6 July 2017 | 8–10 August 2017 |
| Quarterfinals | 14 June 2017 (Luque, Paraguay) | 12–14 September 2017 | 19–21 September 2017 |
| Semifinals | 14 June 2017 (Luque, Paraguay) | 24–26 October 2017 | 31 October – 2 November 2017 |
| Finals | 14 June 2017 (Luque, Paraguay) | 22 November 2017 | 29 November 2017 |

== Draws ==
Location of teams of the 2017 Copa Libertadores.
Brown: Group 1; Red: Group 2; Orange: Group 3;
Yellow: Group 4; Green: Group 5; Blue: Group 6;
Purple: Group 7; Pink: Group 8; White: Play-off rounds.

The draw for the qualifying stages and group stage was held on 21 December 2016, 20:00 PYST (UTC−3), at the CONMEBOL Convention Centre in Luque, Paraguay.

Teams were seeded by their CONMEBOL ranking of the Copa Libertadores (shown in parentheses), taking into account of the following three factors:

1. Performance in the last 10 years, taking into account Copa Libertadores results in the period 2007–2016
2. Historical coefficient, taking into account Copa Libertadores results in the period 1960–2006
3. Local tournament champion, with bonus points awarded to domestic league champions of the last 10 years

For the first stage, the six teams were drawn into three ties (E1–E3), with the seeded teams hosting the second leg.

First stage draw
| Seeded | Unseeded |
|---|---|
| (Ecuador) Independiente del Valle (24); (Venezuela) Deportivo Táchira (43); (Uruguay) Montevideo Wanderers (63) | (Bolivia) Universitario de Sucre (68); (Paraguay) Deportivo Capiatá (no rank); (Peru) Deportivo Municipal (no rank) |

For the second stage, the 16 teams were drawn into eight ties (C1–C8), with the seeded teams hosting the second leg. Teams from the same association could not be drawn into the same tie, excluding the winners of the first stage, which were unseeded and whose identity was not known at the time of the draw, and could be drawn into the same tie with another team from the same association.

Second stage draw
| Seeded | Unseeded |
|---|---|
| (Paraguay) Olimpia (10); (Chile) Colo-Colo (23); (Bolivia) The Strongest (28); (Peru) Universitario (40); (Chile) Unión Española (46); (Colombia) Junior (56); (Colombia) Millonarios (62); (Ecuador) El Nacional (65) | (Brazil) Atlético Paranaense (71); (Brazil) Botafogo (79); (Uruguay) Cerro (106); (Argentina) Atlético Tucumán (no rank); (Venezuela) Carabobo (no rank); First stage winner E1; First stage winner E2; First stage winner E3 |

For the third stage, no draw was made, and the eight teams were allocated into the following four ties (G1–G4), with the second stage winners C5–C8 hosting the second leg. As the identity of the winners of the second stage was not known at the time of the draw, they could be drawn into the same tie with another team from the same association.

- Second stage winner C1 vs. Second stage winner C8
- Second stage winner C2 vs. Second stage winner C7
- Second stage winner C3 vs. Second stage winner C6
- Second stage winner C4 vs. Second stage winner C5

For the group stage, the 32 teams were drawn into eight groups (Groups 1–8) of four containing a team from each of the four pots. Teams from the same association could not be drawn into the same group, excluding the winners of the third stage, which were allocated to Pot 4 and whose identity was not known at the time of the draw, and could be drawn into the same group with another team from the same association.

| Pot 1 | Pot 2 | Pot 3 | Pot 4 |
|---|---|---|---|
| (Colombia) Atlético Nacional (3); (Argentina) River Plate (2); (Uruguay) Nacional (4); (Uruguay) Peñarol (5); (Brazil) Atlético Mineiro (9); (Brazil) Grêmio (12); (Argentina) San Lorenzo (14); (Brazil) Santos (15) | (Brazil) Chapecoense (no rank); (Argentina) Estudiantes (17); (Ecuador) Emelec (18); (Paraguay) Libertad (21); (Colombia) Santa Fe (22); (Brazil) Palmeiras (25); (Chile) Universidad Católica (30); (Paraguay) Guaraní (34) | (Peru) Sporting Cristal (35); (Brazil) Flamengo (37); (Ecuador) Barcelona (39); (Argentina) Lanús (42); (Venezuela) Zamora (66); (Bolivia) Jorge Wilstermann (75); (Colombia) Independiente Medellín (77); (Argentina) Godoy Cruz (88) | (Peru) Melgar (104); (Chile) Deportes Iquique (115); (Bolivia) Sport Boys (162); (Venezuela) Zulia (no rank); Third stage winner G1; Third stage winner G2; Third stage winner G3; Third stage winner G4 |

Notes

1. ^{†} Defending Copa Libertadores champion, automatically seeded into Pot 1 and allocated to Group 1 in the group stage draw.
2. ^{‡} Defending Copa Sudamericana champion, automatically seeded into Pot 2 in the group stage draw.

The draw for the round of 16 was held on 14 June 2017, 20:00 PYT (UTC−4), at the CONMEBOL Convention Center in Luque, Paraguay. For the round of 16, the 16 teams were drawn into eight ties (A–H) between a group winner (Pot 1) and a group runner-up (Pot 2), with the group winners hosting the second leg. Teams from the same association or the same group could be drawn into the same tie.

== Qualifying stages ==
In the qualifying stages, each tie was played on a home-and-away two-legged basis. If tied on aggregate, the away goals rule would be used. If still tied, extra time would not be played, and the penalty shoot-out would be used to determine the winner (Regulations Article 5.2). The qualifying stages were structured as follows:

- First stage (6 teams): The three winners of the first stage advanced to the second stage to join the 13 teams which were given byes to the second stage.
- Second stage (16 teams): The eight winners of the second stage advanced to the third stage.
- Third stage (8 teams): The four winners of the third stage advanced to the group stage to join the 28 direct entrants. The two best teams eliminated in the third stage entered the Copa Sudamericana second stage.

=== First stage ===
| Team 1 | Agg. | Team 2 | 1st leg | 2nd leg |
|---|---|---|---|---|
| Universitario de Sucre (Bolivia) | 5–7 | (Uruguay) Montevideo Wanderers | 3–2 | 2–5 |
| Deportivo Municipal (Peru) | 2–3 | (Ecuador) Independiente del Valle | 0–1 | 2–2 |
| Deportivo Capiatá (Paraguay) | 1–0 | (Venezuela) Deportivo Táchira | 1–0 | 0–0 |

=== Second stage ===
| Team 1 | Agg. | Team 2 | 1st leg | 2nd leg |
|---|---|---|---|---|
| Atlético Paranaense (Brazil) | 1–1 (4–2 p) | (Colombia) Millonarios | 1–0 | 0–1 |
| Botafogo (Brazil) | 3–2 | (Chile) Colo-Colo | 2–1 | 1–1 |
| Cerro (Uruguay) | 2–5 | (Chile) Unión Española | 2–3 | 0–2 |
| Carabobo (Venezuela) | 0–4 | (Colombia) Junior | 0–1 | 0–3 |
| Atlético Tucumán (Argentina) | 3–2 | (Ecuador) El Nacional | 2–2 | 1–0 |
| Montevideo Wanderers (Uruguay) | 0–6 | (Bolivia) The Strongest | 0–2 | 0–4 |
| Independiente del Valle (Ecuador) | 2–3 | (Paraguay) Olimpia | 1–0 | 1–3 |
| Deportivo Capiatá (Paraguay) | 4–3 | (Peru) Universitario | 1–3 | 3–0 |

=== Third stage ===
| Team 1 | Agg. | Team 2 | 1st leg | 2nd leg |
|---|---|---|---|---|
| Atlético Paranaense (Brazil) | 4–3 | (Paraguay) Deportivo Capiatá | 3–3 | 1–0 |
| Botafogo (Brazil) | 1–1 (3–1 p) | (Paraguay) Olimpia | 1–0 | 0–1 |
| Unión Española (Chile) | 1–6 | (Bolivia) The Strongest | 1–1 | 0–5 |
| Junior (Colombia) | 2–3 | (Argentina) Atlético Tucumán | 1–0 | 1–3 |

=== Copa Sudamericana qualification ===
The two best teams eliminated in the third stage entered the Copa Sudamericana second stage. Only matches in the third stage were considered for the ranking of teams.

| Pos | Third stage losers | Pld | W | D | L | GF | GA | GD | Pts | Qualification |
|---|---|---|---|---|---|---|---|---|---|---|
| 1 | (Paraguay) Olimpia | 2 | 1 | 0 | 1 | 1 | 1 | 0 | 3 | Copa Sudamericana |
| 2 | (Colombia) Junior | 2 | 1 | 0 | 1 | 2 | 3 | −1 | 3 | Copa Sudamericana |
| 3 | (Paraguay) Deportivo Capiatá | 2 | 0 | 1 | 1 | 3 | 4 | −1 | 1 | |
| 4 | (Chile) Unión Española | 2 | 0 | 1 | 1 | 1 | 6 | −5 | 1 | |

Source: CONMEBOL
Rules for classification: 1) Points; 2) Goal difference; 3) Goals scored; 4) Away goals scored; 5) CONMEBOL ranking (Regulations Article 3.6).

== Group stage ==
In the group stage, each group was played on a home-and-away round-robin basis. The teams were ranked according to points (3 points for a win, 1 point for a draw, and 0 points for a loss). If tied on points, the following criteria would be used to determine the ranking: 1. Goal difference; 2. Goals scored; 3. Away goals scored; 4. CONMEBOL ranking (Regulations Article 5.1).

The winners and runners-up of each group advanced to the round of 16 of the knockout stages. The third-placed teams of each group entered the Copa Sudamericana second stage.

=== Group 1 ===
| Pos | Team | Pld | W | D | L | GF | GA | GD | Pts | Qualification | BOT | BAR | EST | ATN |
|---|---|---|---|---|---|---|---|---|---|---|---|---|---|---|
| 1 | (Brazil) Botafogo | 6 | 3 | 1 | 2 | 6 | 5 | +1 | 10 | Round of 16 | — | 0–2 | 2–1 | 1–0 |
| 2 | (Ecuador) Barcelona | 6 | 3 | 1 | 2 | 8 | 8 | 0 | 10 | Round of 16 | 1–1 | — | 0–3 | 2–1 |
| 3 | (Argentina) Estudiantes | 6 | 3 | 0 | 3 | 7 | 8 | −1 | 9 | Copa Sudamericana | 1–0 | 0–2 | — | 1–0 |
| 4 | (Colombia) Atlético Nacional | 6 | 2 | 0 | 4 | 8 | 8 | 0 | 6 | | 0–2 | 3–1 | 4–1 | — |

Source: CONMEBOL

=== Group 2 ===
| Pos | Team | Pld | W | D | L | GF | GA | GD | Pts | Qualification | SAN | STR | SFE | CRI |
|---|---|---|---|---|---|---|---|---|---|---|---|---|---|---|
| 1 | (Brazil) Santos | 6 | 3 | 3 | 0 | 11 | 4 | +7 | 12 | Round of 16 | — | 2–0 | 3–2 | 4–0 |
| 2 | (Bolivia) The Strongest | 6 | 2 | 3 | 1 | 9 | 5 | +4 | 9 | Round of 16 | 1–1 | — | 2–0 | 5–1 |
| 3 | (Colombia) Santa Fe | 6 | 2 | 2 | 2 | 8 | 6 | +2 | 8 | Copa Sudamericana | 0–0 | 1–1 | — | 3–0 |
| 4 | (Peru) Sporting Cristal | 6 | 0 | 2 | 4 | 2 | 15 | −13 | 2 | | 1–1 | 0–0 | 0–2 | — |

Source: CONMEBOL

=== Group 3 ===
| Pos | Team | Pld | W | D | L | GF | GA | GD | Pts | Qualification | RIV | EME | DIM | MEL |
|---|---|---|---|---|---|---|---|---|---|---|---|---|---|---|
| 1 | (Argentina) River Plate | 6 | 4 | 1 | 1 | 14 | 9 | +5 | 13 | Round of 16 | — | 1–1 | 1–2 | 4–2 |
| 2 | (Ecuador) Emelec | 6 | 3 | 1 | 2 | 8 | 5 | +3 | 10 | Round of 16 | 1–2 | — | 1–0 | 3–0 |
| 3 | (Colombia) Independiente Medellín | 6 | 3 | 0 | 3 | 8 | 8 | 0 | 9 | Copa Sudamericana | 1–3 | 1–2 | — | 2–0 |
| 4 | (Peru) Melgar | 6 | 1 | 0 | 5 | 6 | 14 | −8 | 3 | | 2–3 | 1–0 | 1–2 | — |

Source: CONMEBOL

=== Group 4 ===
| Pos | Team | Pld | W | D | L | GF | GA | GD | Pts | Qualification | SLA | CAP | FLA | UCA |
|---|---|---|---|---|---|---|---|---|---|---|---|---|---|---|
| 1 | (Argentina) San Lorenzo | 6 | 3 | 1 | 2 | 8 | 8 | 0 | 10 | Round of 16 | — | 0–1 | 2–1 | 2–1 |
| 2 | (Brazil) Atlético Paranaense | 6 | 3 | 1 | 2 | 9 | 10 | −1 | 10 | Round of 16 | 0–3 | — | 2–1 | 2–2 |
| 3 | (Brazil) Flamengo | 6 | 3 | 0 | 3 | 11 | 7 | +4 | 9 | Copa Sudamericana | 4–0 | 2–1 | — | 3–1 |
| 4 | (Chile) Universidad Católica | 6 | 1 | 2 | 3 | 8 | 11 | −3 | 5 | | 1–1 | 2–3 | 1–0 | — |

Source: CONMEBOL

=== Group 5 ===
| Pos | Team | Pld | W | D | L | GF | GA | GD | Pts | Qualification | PAL | WIL | ATU | PEN |
|---|---|---|---|---|---|---|---|---|---|---|---|---|---|---|
| 1 | (Brazil) Palmeiras | 6 | 4 | 1 | 1 | 13 | 9 | +4 | 13 | Round of 16 | — | 1–0 | 3–1 | 3–2 |
| 2 | (Bolivia) Jorge Wilstermann | 6 | 3 | 0 | 3 | 12 | 10 | +2 | 9 | Round of 16 | 3–2 | — | 2–1 | 6–2 |
| 3 | (Argentina) Atlético Tucumán | 6 | 2 | 1 | 3 | 8 | 10 | −2 | 7 | Copa Sudamericana | 1–1 | 2–1 | — | 2–1 |
| 4 | (Uruguay) Peñarol | 6 | 2 | 0 | 4 | 11 | 15 | −4 | 6 | | 2–3 | 2–0 | 2–1 | — |

Source: CONMEBOL

=== Group 6 ===
| Pos | Team | Pld | W | D | L | GF | GA | GD | Pts | Qualification | CAM | GOD | LIB | SBO |
|---|---|---|---|---|---|---|---|---|---|---|---|---|---|---|
| 1 | (Brazil) Atlético Mineiro | 6 | 4 | 1 | 1 | 17 | 6 | +11 | 13 | Round of 16 | — | 4–1 | 2–0 | 5–2 |
| 2 | (Argentina) Godoy Cruz | 6 | 3 | 2 | 1 | 10 | 8 | +2 | 11 | Round of 16 | 1–1 | — | 1–1 | 2–0 |
| 3 | (Paraguay) Libertad | 6 | 1 | 3 | 2 | 7 | 9 | −2 | 6 | Copa Sudamericana | 1–0 | 1–2 | — | 1–1 |
| 4 | (Bolivia) Sport Boys | 6 | 0 | 2 | 4 | 8 | 19 | −11 | 2 | | 1–5 | 1–3 | 3–3 | — |

Source: CONMEBOL

=== Group 7 ===
| Pos | Team | Pld | W | D | L | GF | GA | GD | Pts | Qualification | LAN | NAC | CHA | ZUL |
|---|---|---|---|---|---|---|---|---|---|---|---|---|---|---|
| 1 | (Argentina) Lanús | 6 | 4 | 1 | 1 | 13 | 3 | +10 | 13 | Round of 16 | — | 0–1 | 3–0 (Note: CONMEBOL awarded Lanús a 3–0 win as a result of Chapecoense fielding the ineligible player Luiz Otávio. The match originally ended 1–2.) | 5–0 |
| 2 | (Uruguay) Nacional | 6 | 2 | 2 | 2 | 5 | 3 | +2 | 8 | Round of 16 | 0–1 | — | 3–0 | 0–1 |
| 3 | (Brazil) Chapecoense | 6 | 2 | 1 | 3 | 6 | 12 | −6 | 7 | Copa Sudamericana | 1–3 | 1–1 | — | 2–1 |
| 4 | (Venezuela) Zulia | 6 | 1 | 2 | 3 | 4 | 10 | −6 | 5 | | 1–1 | 0–0 | 1–2 | — |

Source: CONMEBOL

=== Group 8 ===
| Pos | Team | Pld | W | D | L | GF | GA | GD | Pts | Qualification | GRE | GUA | DIQ | ZAM |
|---|---|---|---|---|---|---|---|---|---|---|---|---|---|---|
| 1 | (Brazil) Grêmio | 6 | 4 | 1 | 1 | 15 | 6 | +9 | 13 | Round of 16 | — | 4–1 | 3–2 | 4–0 |
| 2 | (Paraguay) Guaraní | 6 | 3 | 2 | 1 | 9 | 7 | +2 | 11 | Round of 16 | 1–1 | — | 0–0 | 3–1 |
| 3 | (Chile) Deportes Iquique | 6 | 3 | 1 | 2 | 12 | 9 | +3 | 10 | Copa Sudamericana | 2–1 | 0–1 | — | 4–3 |
| 4 | (Venezuela) Zamora | 6 | 0 | 0 | 6 | 6 | 20 | −14 | 0 | | 0–2 | 1–3 | 1–4 | — |

Source: CONMEBOL

== Final stages ==
Starting from the round of 16, the teams played a single-elimination tournament with the following rules:

- Each tie was played on a home-and-away two-legged basis, with the higher-seeded team hosting the second leg (Regulations Article 3.10).
- In the round of 16, quarterfinals, and semifinals, if tied on aggregate, the away goals rule would be used. If still tied, extra time would not be played, and the penalty shoot-out would be used to determine the winner (Regulations Article 5.2).
- In the finals, if tied on aggregate, the away goals rule would not be used, and 30 minutes of extra time would be played. If still tied after extra time, the penalty shoot-out would be used to determine the winner (Regulations Article 5.3).

There were two format changes from the previous season:

- While the seeding was still used to decide the order of legs, it was no longer used to decide the bracket, which was decided by the round of 16 draw.
- If there were two semifinalists from the same association, the bracket was no longer adjusted and remained as it was.

=== Seeding ===
Starting from the round of 16, the teams were seeded according to their results in the group stage, with the group winners (Pot 1 in round of 16 draw) seeded 1–8, and the group runners-up (Pot 2 in round of 16 draw) seeded 9–16.

| Seed | Grp | Team | Pld | W | D | L | GF | GA | GD | Pts | Round of 16 draw |
|---|---|---|---|---|---|---|---|---|---|---|---|
| 1 | 6 | (Brazil) Atlético Mineiro | 6 | 4 | 1 | 1 | 17 | 6 | +11 | 13 | Pot 1 |
| 2 | 7 | (Argentina) Lanús | 6 | 4 | 1 | 1 | 13 | 3 | +10 | 13 | Pot 1 |
| 3 | 8 | (Brazil) Grêmio | 6 | 4 | 1 | 1 | 15 | 6 | +9 | 13 | Pot 1 |
| 4 | 3 | (Argentina) River Plate | 6 | 4 | 1 | 1 | 14 | 9 | +5 | 13 | Pot 1 |
| 5 | 5 | (Brazil) Palmeiras | 6 | 4 | 1 | 1 | 13 | 9 | +4 | 13 | Pot 1 |
| 6 | 2 | (Brazil) Santos | 6 | 3 | 3 | 0 | 11 | 4 | +7 | 12 | Pot 1 |
| 7 | 1 | (Brazil) Botafogo | 6 | 3 | 1 | 2 | 6 | 5 | +1 | 10 | Pot 1 |
| 8 | 4 | (Argentina) San Lorenzo | 6 | 3 | 1 | 2 | 8 | 8 | 0 | 10 | Pot 1 |
| 9 | 6 | (Argentina) Godoy Cruz | 6 | 3 | 2 | 1 | 10 | 8 | +2 | 11 | Pot 2 |
| 10 | 8 | (Paraguay) Guaraní | 6 | 3 | 2 | 1 | 9 | 7 | +2 | 11 | Pot 2 |
| 11 | 3 | (Ecuador) Emelec | 6 | 3 | 1 | 2 | 8 | 5 | +3 | 10 | Pot 2 |
| 12 | 1 | (Ecuador) Barcelona | 6 | 3 | 1 | 2 | 8 | 8 | 0 | 10 | Pot 2 |
| 13 | 4 | (Brazil) Atlético Paranaense | 6 | 3 | 1 | 2 | 9 | 10 | −1 | 10 | Pot 2 |
| 14 | 2 | (Bolivia) The Strongest | 6 | 2 | 3 | 1 | 9 | 5 | +4 | 9 | Pot 2 |
| 15 | 5 | (Bolivia) Jorge Wilstermann | 6 | 3 | 0 | 3 | 12 | 10 | +2 | 9 | Pot 2 |
| 16 | 7 | (Uruguay) Nacional | 6 | 2 | 2 | 2 | 5 | 3 | +2 | 8 | Pot 2 |

Source: CONMEBOL
Rules for classification: 1) Higher position in group; 2) Points; 3) Goal difference; 4) Goals scored; 5) Away goals scored; 6) CONMEBOL ranking (Regulations Article 3.8h).

=== Bracket ===
The bracket was decided based on the round of 16 draw, which was held on 14 June 2017.

Round of 16
12 | (Ecuador) Barcelona (p) | 1 | 0 | 1 (5)
5 | (Brazil) Palmeiras | 0 | 1 | 1 (4)
13 | (Brazil) Atlético Paranaense | 2 | 0 | 2
6 | (Brazil) Santos | 3 | 1 | 4
16 | (Uruguay) Nacional | 0 | 0 | 0
7 | (Brazil) Botafogo | 1 | 2 | 3
9 | (Argentina) Godoy Cruz | 0 | 1 | 1
3 | (Brazil) Grêmio | 1 | 2 | 3
15 | (Bolivia) Jorge Wilstermann | 1 | 0 | 1
1 | (Brazil) Atlético Mineiro | 0 | 0 | 0
10 | (Paraguay) Guaraní | 0 | 1 | 1
4 | (Argentina) River Plate | 2 | 1 | 3
11 | (Ecuador) Emelec | 0 | 1 | 1 (4)
8 | (Argentina) San Lorenzo (p) | 1 | 0 | 1 (5)
14 | (Bolivia) The Strongest | 1 | 0 | 1
2 | (Argentina) Lanús | 1 | 1 | 2

Quarterfinals
12 | (Ecuador) Barcelona | 1 | 1 | 2
6 | (Brazil) Santos | 1 | 0 | 1
7 | (Brazil) Botafogo | 0 | 0 | 0
3 | (Brazil) Grêmio | 0 | 1 | 1
15 | (Bolivia) Jorge Wilstermann | 3 | 0 | 3
4 | (Argentina) River Plate | 0 | 8 | 8
8 | (Argentina) San Lorenzo | 2 | 0 | 2 (3)
2 | (Argentina) Lanús (p) | 0 | 2 | 2 (4)

Semifinals
12 | (Ecuador) Barcelona | 0 | 1 | 1
3 | (Brazil) Grêmio | 3 | 0 | 3
4 | (Argentina) River Plate | 1 | 2 | 3
2 | (Argentina) Lanús | 0 | 4 | 4

Finals
3 | (Brazil) Grêmio | 1 | 2 | 3
2 | (Argentina) Lanús | 0 | 1 | 1

=== Round of 16 ===
| Team 1 | Agg. | Team 2 | 1st leg | 2nd leg |
|---|---|---|---|---|
| Guaraní (Paraguay) | 1–3 | (Argentina) River Plate | 0–2 | 1–1 |
| Atlético Paranaense (Brazil) | 2–4 | (Brazil) Santos | 2–3 | 0–1 |
| Nacional (Uruguay) | 0–3 | (Brazil) Botafogo | 0–1 | 0–2 |
| Emelec (Ecuador) | 1–1 (4–5 p) | (Argentina) San Lorenzo | 0–1 | 1–0 |
| The Strongest (Bolivia) | 1–2 | (Argentina) Lanús | 1–1 | 0–1 |
| Godoy Cruz (Argentina) | 1–3 | (Brazil) Grêmio | 0–1 | 1–2 |
| Barcelona (Ecuador) | 1–1 (5–4 p) | (Brazil) Palmeiras | 1–0 | 0–1 |
| Jorge Wilstermann (Bolivia) | 1–0 | (Brazil) Atlético Mineiro | 1–0 | 0–0 |

=== Quarterfinals ===
| Team 1 | Agg. | Team 2 | 1st leg | 2nd leg |
|---|---|---|---|---|
| Jorge Wilstermann (Bolivia) | 3–8 | (Argentina) River Plate | 3–0 | 0–8 |
| Barcelona (Ecuador) | 2–1 | (Brazil) Santos | 1–1 | 1–0 |
| Botafogo (Brazil) | 0–1 | (Brazil) Grêmio | 0–0 | 0–1 |
| San Lorenzo (Argentina) | 2–2 (3–4 p) | (Argentina) Lanús | 2–0 | 0–2 |

=== Semifinals ===
| Team 1 | Agg. | Team 2 | 1st leg | 2nd leg |
|---|---|---|---|---|
| River Plate (Argentina) | 3–4 | (Argentina) Lanús | 1–0 | 2–4 |
| Barcelona (Ecuador) | 1–3 | (Brazil) Grêmio | 0–3 | 1–0 |

=== Finals ===
22 November 2017
21:45 UTC−2

| Grêmio (Brazil) | 1–0 | (Argentina) Lanús |
|---|---|---|
| Cícero 82' | Report |

Arena do Grêmio, Porto Alegre
Attendance: 55,188
Referee: Julio Bascuñán (Chile)

29 November 2017
20:45 UTC−3

| Lanús (Argentina) | 1–2 | (Brazil) Grêmio |
|---|---|---|
| Sand 71' (pen.) | Report | Fernandinho 26'; Luan 41' |

Estadio Ciudad de Lanús, Lanús
Attendance: 45,000
Referee: Enrique Cáceres (Paraguay)

Grêmio won 3–1 on aggregate.

== Statistics ==
=== Top scorers ===
| Rank | Player | Team | SS1 | SS2 | TS1 | TS2 | MD1 | MD2 | MD3 | MD4 | MD5 | MD6 | 2R1 | 2R2 | QF1 | QF2 | SF1 | SF2 | F1 | F2 | Total |
|---|---|---|---|---|---|---|---|---|---|---|---|---|---|---|---|---|---|---|---|---|---|
| 1 | (Argentina) José Sand | (Argentina) Lanús | | | | | 0 | 1 | 1 | 1 | 1 | 0 | 0 | 1 | 0 | 1 | 0 | 2 | 0 | 1 | 9 |
| 2 | (Bolivia) Alejandro Chumacero | (Bolivia) The Strongest | 1 | 1 | 1 | 1 | 2 | 0 | 0 | 1 | 1 | 0 | 0 | 0 | | | | | | | 8 |
| 2 | (Brazil) Luan | (Brazil) Grêmio | | | | | 1 | 2 | × | 0 | 0 | 2 | 0 | 0 | × | 0 | 2 | 0 | 0 | 1 | 8 |
| 2 | (Argentina) Ignacio Scocco | (Argentina) River Plate | | | | | | | | | | | 1 | 0 | 0 | 5 | 1 | 1 | | | 8 |
| 5 | (Uruguay) Jonathan Álvez | (Ecuador) Barcelona | | | | | 1 | × | 0 | 1 | 0 | 0 | 1 | 0 | 1 | 1 | × | 1 | | | 6 |
| 5 | (Paraguay) Lucas Barrios | (Brazil) Grêmio | | | | | 0 | 0 | 0 | 3 | 1 | 1 | 0 | 0 | 0 | 1 | 0 | × | 0 | 0 | 6 |
| 5 | (Brazil) Fred | (Brazil) Atlético Mineiro | | | | | 1 | 4 | 0 | 0 | × | 1 | 0 | 0 | | | | | | | 6 |
| 8 | (Uruguay) Matías Alonso | (Bolivia) The Strongest | 1 | 2 | 0 | 0 | 0 | 0 | 0 | 2 | 0 | 0 | 0 | 0 | | | | | | | 5 |
| 8 | (Argentina) Nicolás Blandi | (Argentina) San Lorenzo | | | | | 0 | 0 | 1 | 1 | 1 | 0 | 0 | 0 | 2 | 0 | | | | | 5 |
| 8 | (Ecuador) Juan Cazares | (Brazil) Atlético Mineiro | | | | | 0 | 0 | 0 | 1 | 2 | 2 | 0 | 0 | | | | | | | 5 |
| 8 | (Brazil) Rodrigo Pimpão | (Brazil) Botafogo | 0 | 1 | 1 | 0 | 1 | 0 | 0 | 0 | 1 | × | 0 | 1 | 0 | 0 | | | | | 5 |
| 8 | (Argentina) Fernando Zampedri | (Argentina) Atlético Tucumán | 1 | 1 | 0 | 1 | 1 | 0 | 0 | 0 | 1 | × | | | | | | | | | 5 |

Source: CONMEBOL.com

=== Top assists ===
| Rank | Player | Team | Assists |
|---|---|---|---|
| 1 | (Brazil) Lucas Lima | (Brazil) Santos | 6 |
| 2 | (Uruguay) Matías Alonso | (Bolivia) The Strongest | 5 |
| 2 | (Bolivia) Pablo Daniel Escobar | (Bolivia) The Strongest | 5 |
| 4 | (Argentina) Marcos Mondaini | (Ecuador) Emelec | 4 |
| 4 | (Uruguay) Alejandro Silva | (Argentina) Lanús | 4 |
| 6 | (Argentina) Marcelo Bergese | (Bolivia) Jorge Wilstermann | 3 |
| 6 | (Argentina) Diego Buonanotte | (Chile) Universidad Católica | 3 |
| 6 | (Bolivia) Rudy Cardozo | (Bolivia) Jorge Wilstermann | 3 |
| 6 | (Argentina) Fernando Evangelista | (Argentina) Atlético Tucumán | 3 |
| 6 | (Chile) José Pedro Fuenzalida | (Chile) Universidad Católica | 3 |
| 6 | (Paraguay) Julio Irrazábal | (Paraguay) Deportivo Capiatá | 3 |
| 6 | (Brazil) Matheus Rossetto | (Brazil) Atlético Paranaense | 3 |
| 6 | (Brazil) Pedro Rocha | (Brazil) Grêmio | 3 |
| 6 | (Argentina) Luis Miguel Rodríguez | (Argentina) Atlético Tucumán | 3 |

Source: CONMEBOL.com

=== Team of the tournament ===
Pasión Fútbol selected the following 11 players as the team of the tournament.

| Position | Player | Team |
|---|---|---|
| Goalkeeper | (Brazil) Marcelo Grohe | (Brazil) Grêmio |
| Defenders | (Brazil) Edílson | (Brazil) Grêmio |
| Defenders | (Brazil) Pedro Geromel | (Brazil) Grêmio |
| Defenders | (Argentina) Diego Braghieri | (Argentina) Lanús |
| Defenders | (Brazil) Bruno Cortez | (Brazil) Grêmio |
| Midfielders | (Argentina) Iván Marcone | (Argentina) Lanús |
| Midfielders | (Argentina) Leonardo Ponzio | (Argentina) River Plate |
| Midfielders | (Brazil) Arthur | (Brazil) Grêmio |
| Forwards | (Brazil) Luan | (Brazil) Grêmio |
| Forwards | (Argentina) José Sand | (Argentina) Lanús |
| Forwards | (Argentina) Lautaro Acosta | (Argentina) Lanús |

== See also ==
- 2017 FIFA Club World Cup
- 2017 Copa Sudamericana
- 2018 Recopa Sudamericana
