= Fernando Luna (footballer) =

Argentine footballer (born 1990)

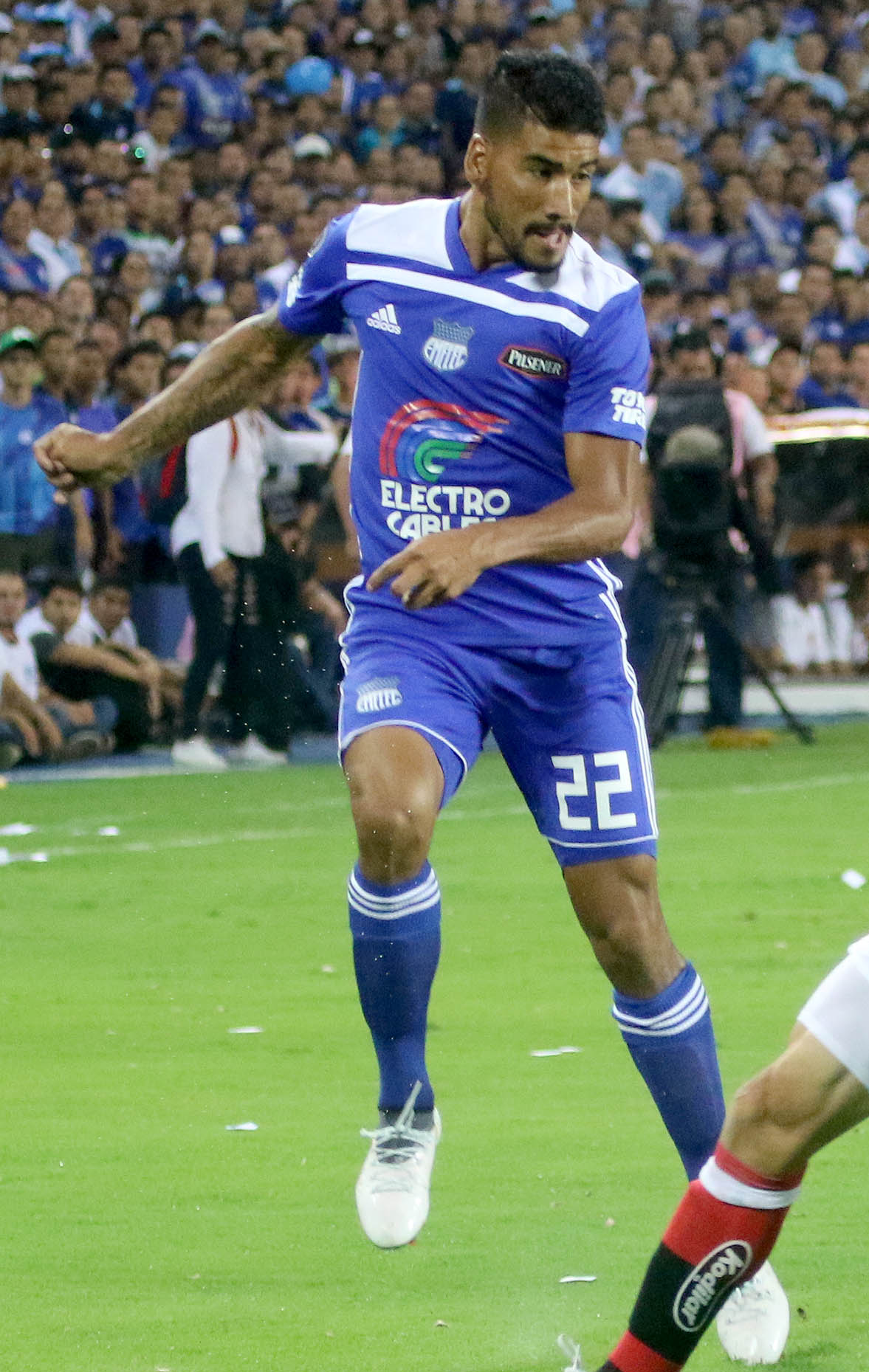

Personal information
- Full name: Fernando David Luna
- Date of birth: 19 January 1990 (age 36)
- Place of birth: Ramallo Partido, Argentina
- Height: 1.75 m (5 ft 9 in)
- Position: Midfielder

Senior career*
| Years | Team | Apps | (Gls) |
| 2011–2012 | Defensores de Belgrano | 14 | (3) |
| 2012 | Social Ramallo | | |
| 2012–2013 | Américo Tesorieri | 7 | (0) |
| 2013 | → Atlético Uruguay (loan) | 9 | (1) |
| 2013 | La Emilia | | |
| 2013–2014 | Villa Dálmine | 11 | (1) |
| 2014–2016 | Tristán Suárez | 27 | (3) |
| 2015–2016 | → Arsenal de Sarandí (loan) | 15 | (2) |
| 2016–2017 | Atlético de Rafaela | 28 | (5) |
| 2017–2019 | Emelec | 53 | (7) |
| 2020–2021 | Patronato | 12 | (0) |
| 2021 | Quilmes | 6 | (0) |
| 2022 | Independiente Rivadavia | 21 | (2) |
| 2023 | Palmaflor | 20 | (5) |
| 2024 | Ferro Carril Oeste (GP) | 3 | (0) |
- * Club domestic league appearances and goals as of 17:22, 27 May 2025 (UTC)

Fernando David Luna (born 19 January 1990) is an Argentine professional footballer who plays as a midfielder.

== Career ==
Luna began with Defensores de Belgrano in 2011, prior to having subsequent spells with Social Ramallo, Américo Tesorieri, Atlético Uruguay (loan) and La Emilia. He left La Emilia in 2013 to join Villa Dálmine of Primera B Metropolitana. He made his debut for the club on 3 August in a league match against Comunicaciones. Ten more appearances came, one included his only goal for Villa Dálmine, before he departed to sign for fellow Primera B Metropolitana team Tristán Suárez. He went onto make twenty-seven appearances and scored three goals in two seasons with Tristán Suárez.

In July 2015, Luna joined Argentine Primera División club Arsenal de Sarandí on loan for the 2015 and 2016 campaigns. He played his first top-flight game on 4 August in a 4–1 loss to Banfield, while in his next match, vs. Boca Juniors, Luna scored one of his two goals for Arsenal. Overall, he participated fifteen times for Arsenal and scored twice before returning to his parent club. On 11 July 2016, Luna joined Primera División side Atlético de Rafaela permanently. Five goals in twenty-eight matches followed. At the end of the 2016–17 campaign, Luna left to join Ecuadorian Serie A team Emelec. He scored three goals in twenty appearances in all competitions during his first season with Emelec, which concluded with them winning the 2017 league title.

On 26 December 2019 Club Atlético Patronato confirmed, that Luna had joined the club on a deal until the summer 2021.

== Career statistics ==
As of 2 January 2019.

Club statistics
| Club | Season | League | | | Cup (Note: Includes the Copa Argentina) | | League Cup | | Continental (Note: Includes the Copa Libertadores) | | Other (Note: Includes the Ecuadorian Serie A play-offs) | | Total | |
| Club | Season | Division | Apps | Goals | Apps | Goals | Apps | Goals | Apps | Goals | Apps | Goals | Apps | Goals |
|---|---|---|---|---|---|---|---|---|---|---|---|---|---|---|
| Atlético de Rafaela | 2016–17 | Primera División | 28 | 5 | 1 | 0 | — | | — | | 0 | 0 | 29 | 5 |
| Emelec | 2017 | Serie A | 16 | 3 | — | | — | | 2 (Note: Two appearances in 2017 Copa Libertadores) | 0 | 2 (Note: Two appearances in 2017 Serie A play-offs) | 0 | 20 | 3 |
| Emelec | 2018 | Serie A | 27 | 4 | — | | — | | 6 (Note: Six appearances in 2018 Copa Libertadores) | 0 | 1 (Note: One appearance in 2018 Serie A play-offs) | 0 | 34 | 4 |
| Emelec | 2019 | Serie A | 0 | 0 | — | | — | | 0 | 0 | 0 | 0 | 0 | 0 |
| Emelec | Total | | 43 | 7 | — | | — | | 8 | 0 | 3 | 0 | 51 | 7 |
| Career total | | | 71 | 12 | 1 | 0 | — | | 8 | 0 | 3 | 0 | 83 | 12 |

== Honours ==
Emelec

- Ecuadorian Serie A: 2017
