= Diego Bielkiewicz =

Argentinean footballer

Personal information
- Full name: Diego Osvaldo Bielkiewicz
- Date of birth: 4 January 1991 (age 35)
- Place of birth: Buenos Aires, Argentina
- Height: 1.82 m (6 ft 0 in)
- Position: Forward

Team information
- Current team: Provincial Osorno
- Number: 9

Senior career*
| Years | Team | Apps | (Gls) |
| –2010 | Lanús | 2 | (0) |
| 2010–2012 | Atlanta | 40 | (4) |
| 2012–2013 | San Telmo | 24 | (3) |
| 2013–2014 | Flandria | 27 | (4) |
| 2014–2015 | Gimnasia y Tiro | 38 | (7) |
| 2015–2016 | Estudiantes de Buenos Aires | 4 | (0) |
| 2016–2017 | Defensores de Belgrano | 17 | (8) |
| 2017–2018 | Deportes Iquique | 19 | (5) |
| 2018 | Seoul E-Land FC | 18 | (3) |
| 2018–2019 | Rangers de Talca | 19 | (7) |
| 2019–2021 | Magallanes | 3 | (1) |
| 2021–2022 | Rajasthan United | – | (–) |
| 2022 | Cipolletti | 26 | (4) |
| 2023– | Provincial Osorno | 34 | (21) |
- * Club domestic league appearances and goals as of 19 January 2023

Diego Osvaldo Bielkiewicz (born 4 January 1991) is an Argentine professional footballer who plays as a forward for Chilean side Provincial Osorno.

== Career ==
Bielkiewicz started his senior career with Lanús. In 2010, he signed for Club Atlético Atlanta in the Primera B Metropolitana, where he made forty-two appearances and scored five goals. After that, he played for San Telmo, Flandria, Gimnasia y Tiro, Estudiantes de Buenos Aires, Defensores de Belgrano, Deportes Iquique, Seoul E-Land, Rangers de Talca, and CD Magallanes, where he now plays.

In November 2021, Bielkiewicz moved to India and signed with newly promoted I-League club Rajasthan United FC on a season-long deal.

In January 2023, he joined Provincial Osorno in the Segunda División Profesional de Chile.
