= Cristhian Machado =

Bolivian footballer (born 1990)

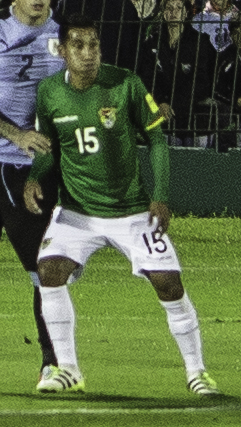
- Machado in 2017

Personal information
- Full name: Cristhian Machado Pinto
- Date of birth: June 20, 1990 (age 36)
- Place of birth: Cochabamba, Bolivia
- Height: 1.73 m (5 ft 8 in)
- Position: Defensive midfielder

Team information
- Current team: San Antonio
- Number: 15

Senior career*
Years	Team	Apps	(Gls)
2008–2018	Wilstermann	137	(2)
2012	→ Fort Lauderdale Strikers (loan)	0	(0)
2014–2015	→ Sport Boys (loan)	12	(0)
2018	→ New England Revolution (loan)	3	(0)
2019	Royal Pari	9	(2)
2019–2020	Bolívar	41	(1)
2021–2022	Always Ready	19	(0)
2022	→ Wilstermann (loan)	22	(0)
2023–2025	Wilstermann	105	(4)
2026–	San Antonio	0	(0)

International career
2016–	Bolivia	3	(0)
- * Club domestic league appearances and goals as of 30 December 2025

Cristhian Machado Pinto (born 20 June 1990) is a Bolivian footballer who plays as a midfielder for San Antonio.

== Professional career ==
Over the first 10 years of his career, Machado made 145 appearances and 120 starts for C.D. Jorge Wilstermann in the Bolivian Primera División. During his time with the club he helped them to two first-division titles in 2016 and 2018. On July 23, 2018, The New England Revolution of Major League Soccer acquired Machado from Wilstermann via the Major League Soccer secondary transfer window. Revolution coach Brad Friedel had originally tried to sign Machado in December 2017 but was unable to complete the deal.

Though he'd played the entirety of his pre-Revolution career with Wilstermann, he had played in the United States prior to joining the Revolution when he spent six months with the Fort Lauderdale Strikers in the North American Soccer League. Machado would be re-joining Marcelo Neveleff, then a Revolution assistant coach, who had spent time with Wilstermann in the 2011–12 season. At the time of his signing, Machado had 2 starts in World Cup Qualifying matches with the Bolivia national team. Machado called his move to MLS a "Dream come true" and Revolution GM Mike Burns praised Cristhian's versatility:

"We are happy to add a talented and experienced player in Cristhian who is capable of contributing in a variety of positions and roles on the field. We believe his versatility and pedigree will immediately benefit the club and add competition to the roster.

— Mike Burns

Machado made his first appearance for the Revolution on August 4, 2018. Appearing in the 87th minute as a substitute for Diego Fagundez in a 3–3 draw with Orlando City SC.

Machado made his first start for the Revolution on August 25, 2018, in a 1–0 away loss to the Philadelphia Union.

The Revolution declined Machado's contract option on November 5, 2018.
