= Luiz Otávio (footballer, born 1992) =

Brazilian footballer

Personal information
- Full name: Luiz Otávio da Silva Santos
- Date of birth: 9 October 1992 (age 34)
- Place of birth: Japeri, Brazil
- Height: 1.94 m (6 ft 4 1/2 in)
- Position: Centre back

Team information
- Current team: Ceará
- Number: 4

Youth career
- Fluminense
- Ferroviário-CE
- São Cristóvão
- Bangu

Senior career*
Years	Team	Apps	(Gls)
2012–2014	Bangu	0	(0)
2013–2014	→ Bonsucesso (loan)	25	(1)
2015–2017	Luverdense	66	(4)
2017	→ Chapecoense (loan)	26	(3)
2018–2021	Chapecoense	49	(3)
2019	→ Botafogo-SP (loan)	29	(1)
2020	→ Mirassol (loan)	10	(1)
2021–2022	Bahia	53	(5)
2023–2026	Mirassol	97	(5)
2026–	Ceará	29	(3)
- * Club domestic league appearances and goals as of 18 November 2026

Luiz Otávio da Silva Santos (born 9 October 1992), known as Luiz Otávio, is a Brazilian footballer who plays as a central defender for Ceará.

== Club career ==
Born in Japeri, Rio de Janeiro, Luiz Otávio started his career in Fluminense's youth categories, but was released after only three months at the club. In 2010, aged 17, he moved to Fortaleza and joined Ferroviário-CE, but never played for the club.

Luiz Otávio subsequently represented São Cristóvão and Bangu, making his senior debut with the latter as a forward on 22 September 2012 by coming on as a substitute and scoring the equalizer in a 1–1 Copa Rio away draw against Boavista. Back to his preferred position, he was subsequently loaned to Bonsucesso in 2013, achieving promotion from the Campeonato Carioca Série B.

On 12 February 2015, after leaving Bangu through a court dispute, Luiz Otávio signed for Série B side Luverdense. He made his debut in the category on 11 July, starting in a 0–0 away draw against CRB.

Luiz Otávio scored his first goal in the second tier on 24 October 2015, netting his team's first in a 3–2 loss at Bragantino. An undisputed starter during the following years, he moved to Chapecoense on a one-year loan deal on 5 January 2017.

On 4 April 2017, Luiz Otávio scored the winning goal of the first leg of the Recopa Sudamericana finals, giving his side a 2–1 lead.

== Career statistics ==
As of 24 October 2021

Club	Season	League			State League		Cup		Continental		Other		Total	
Club	Season	Division	Apps	Goals	Apps	Goals	Apps	Goals	Apps	Goals	Apps	Goals	Apps	Goals
Bangu	2012	Carioca	—		0	0	—		—		3 (Note: Appearance(s) in Copa Rio)	1	3	1
Bonsucesso	2013	Carioca Série B	—		13	0	—		—		7	0	20	0
Bonsucesso	2014	Carioca	—		12	1	—		—		—		12	1
Bonsucesso	Total		—		25	1	—		—		7	0	32	1
Luverdense	2015	Série B	25	1	6	0	0	0	—		2 (Note: Appearance(s) in Copa Verde)	0	33	1
Luverdense	2016	Série B	20	1	15	2	—		—		2	0	37	3
Luverdense	Total		45	2	21	2	0	0	—		4	0	72	4
Chapecoense (loan)	2017	Série A	12	1	7	1	1	1	4 (Note: Appearance(s) in Copa Libertadores)	1	2 (Note: One appearance in Primeira Liga, one appearance and one goal in Recopa Sudamericana)	1	26	5
Chapecoense	2018	Série A	4	0	1	0	0	0	0	0	—		5	0
Chapecoense	2019	Série A	0	0	8	0	1	0	0	0	—		9	0
Chapecoense	2020	Série B	28	1	6	0	0	0	—		—		34	1
Chapecoense	2021	Série A	0	0	0	0	0	0	—		1 (Note: Appearance(s) in Recopa Catarinense)	0	1	0
Chapecoense	Total		32	1	15	0	1	0	0	0	1	0	49	1
Botafogo-SP (loan)	2019	Série B	29	1	—		—		—		—		29	1
Mirassol (loan)	2020	Série D	0	0	10	1	—		—		—		10	1
Bahia	2021	Série A	21	2	0	0	4	0	4 (Note: Appearance(s) in Copa Sudamericana)	1	4 (Note: Appearance(s) in Copa do Nordeste)	0	33	3
Career total			139	7	78	5	6	1	8	2	21	2	252	17

== Honours ==
Luverdense

- Campeonato Matogrossense: 2016

Chapecoense

- Campeonato Catarinense: 2017, 2020
- Campeonato Brasileiro Série B: 2020

Bahia

- Copa do Nordeste: 2021
