= Alejandro Silva (footballer, born 1989) =

Uruguayan footballer (born 1989)

Personal information
- Full name: Alejandro Daniel Silva González
- Date of birth: 4 September 1989 (age 37)
- Place of birth: Montevideo, Uruguay
- Height: 1.78 m (5 ft 10 in)
- Positions: Right midfielder; right-back

Team information
- Current team: Libertad
- Number: 13

Youth career
- Danubio
- Central Español
- Fénix

Senior career*
Years	Team	Apps	(Gls)
2010–2012	Fénix	39	(4)
2012–2013	Olimpia	45	(9)
2014–2018	Lanús	58	(6)
2014	→ Peñarol (loan)	12	(0)
2015–2016	→ Olimpia (loan)	38	(18)
2018	Montreal Impact	31	(5)
2019–2023	Olimpia	160	(44)
2024–	Libertad	21	(2)

International career
2012	Uruguay U23	1	(0)
2013–2017	Uruguay	4	(0)
- * Club domestic league appearances and goals as of 22 September 2024

Alejandro Daniel Silva González (born 4 September 1989) is a Uruguayan professional footballer who plays as a right midfielder for Paraguayan Primera División club Libertad.

He is a two-footed player with the ability to defend, run with the ball, set up goals and score as well.

== Early life ==
In his adolescence, Silva believed that football was not for him and opted to work. He worked as pizza delivery boy and in some more jobs. But one day, playing a neighborhood amateur championship, he was seen by Mario Icardo, director of Boston River, which saw on him many conditions and decided to take him to the club. After making the pre-season, the manager at exercise decided that it would not consider him for the team.

Taking advantage that he was already physically fit, and with the support of his family, Silva went to try his luck at Centro Atlético Fénix where he was seen by Rosario Martínez who decided to call him to play for the reserve team.

== Career ==
Silva made his professional debut for Fénix on 23 January 2013 against River Plate playing the whole match. He played with the club the Copa Sudamericana being eliminated in first stage by the subsequent champions Universidad de Chile.

In July 2012, Silva signed a new deal with Paraguayan side Club Olimpia. In February 2014, Silva moved to Argentina and signed with Lanús. In August 2014 he moved back to Peñarol on loan from Lanús.

== Career statistics ==
As of 24 February 2018

Appearances and goals by club, season and competition
Club	Season	League			Cup		Other		Total	
Club	Season	Division	Apps	Goals	Apps	Goals	Apps	Goals	Apps	Goals
Fénix	2009–10	Uruguayan Primera División	4	0	0	0	0	0	4	0
Fénix	2010–11	Uruguayan Primera División	6	2	0	0	0	0	6	2
Fénix	2011–12	Uruguayan Primera División	29	2	0	0	2 (Note: Appearances in Copa Sudamericana)	0	31	2
Fénix	Total		39	4	0	0	2	0	41	4
Olimpia	2012	Paraguayan Primera División	15	0	0	0	2	0	17	0
Olimpia	2013	Paraguayan Primera División	30	9	0	0	13 (Note: Appearances in Copa Libertadores)	1	43	10
Olimpia	Total		45	9	0	0	15	1	60	10
Lanús	2013–14	Argentine Primera División	13	0	1	0	6 (Note: Five appearances in Copa Libertadores, One appearance in Recopa Sudamericana)	0	20	0
Lanús	2015	Argentine Primera División	8	0	1	0	0	0	9	0
Lanús	2016–17	Argentine Primera División	23	3	2	0	8 (Note: Six appearances in Copa Libertadores, One appearance in Copa Sudamericana, One appearance in Supercopa Argentina)	2	33	5
Lanús	2017–18	Argentine Primera División	13	2	1	1	9 (Note: Eight appearances in Copa Libertadores, One appearance in Copa Sudamericana)	2	23	5
Lanús	Total		57	5	5	1	23	4	85	10
Peñarol (loan)	2014–15	Uruguayan Primera División	12	0	0	0	6	0	18	0
Career totals			153	18	5	1	46	5	204	24

== Honours ==
Olimpia

- Copa Libertadores runner-up: 2013
