= Nicolás Blandi =

Argentine footballer

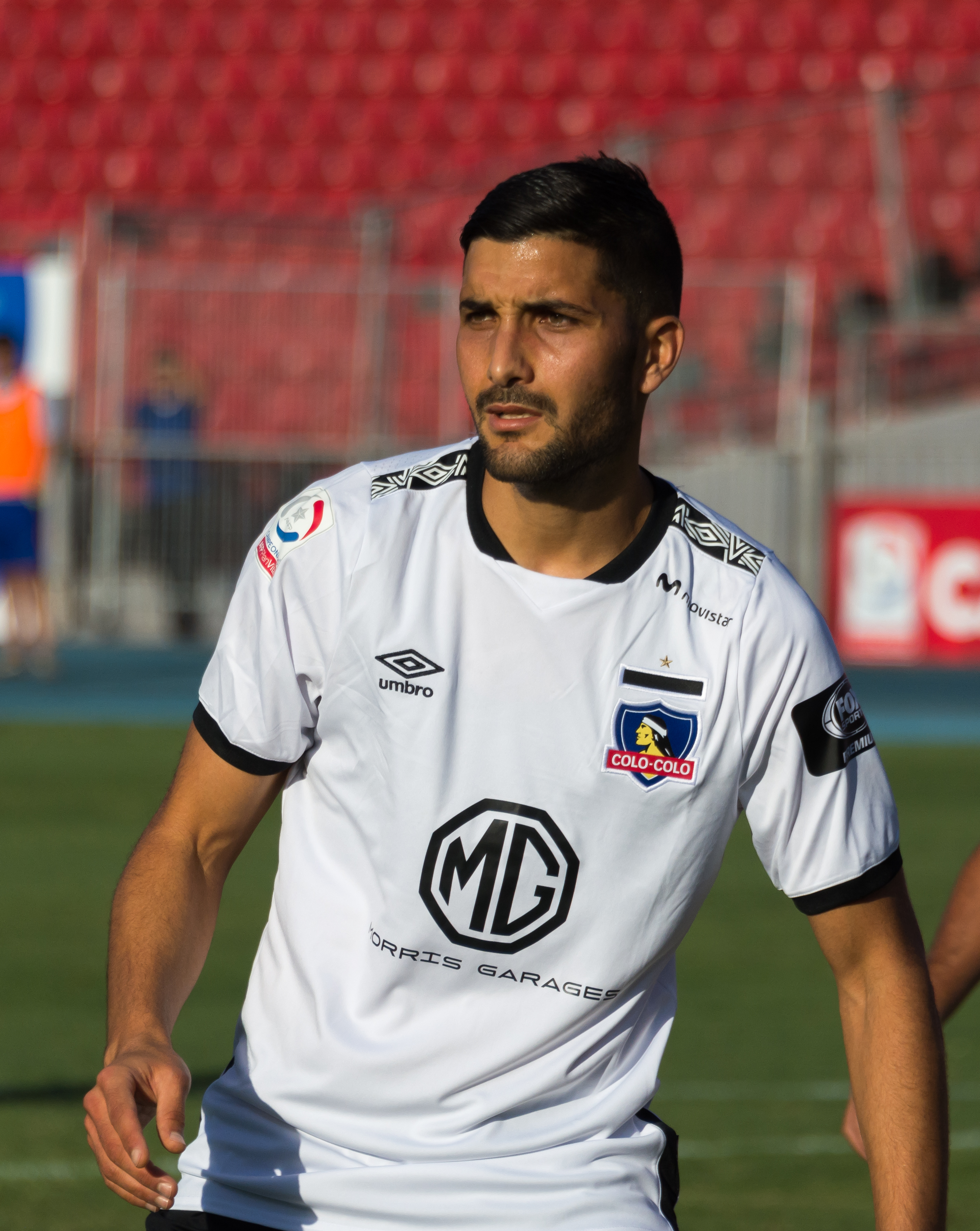
- Blandi with Colo-Colo in 2020

Personal information
- Full name: Nicolás Blandi
- Date of birth: 13 January 1990 (age 36)
- Place of birth: Campana, Argentina
- Height: 1.81 m (5 ft 11 in)
- Position: Forward

Youth career
- 1995–2000: EFI
- 2000–2001: Puerto Nuevo
- 2001–2002: Villa Dálmine
- 2002–2005: Chacarita Juniors
- 2005–2010: Boca Juniors

Senior career*
Years	Team	Apps	(Gls)
2010–2013	Boca Juniors	43	(13)
2010–2011	→ Argentinos Juniors (loan)	25	(6)
2014–2019	San Lorenzo	111	(44)
2015	→ Evian TG (loan)	6	(2)
2015	→ Evian TG II (loan)	1	(0)
2020–2021	Colo-Colo	16	(2)
2021–2022	Unión Santa Fe	4	(0)
2022–2024	San Lorenzo	29	(1)
2024	Defensa y Justicia	3	(0)
2024–2025	Danubio	8	(1)
2025	Barracas Central	2	(1)
- * Club domestic league appearances and goals as of 17:58, 28 December 2025 (UTC)

Nicolás Blandi (born 13 January 1990) is an Argentine footballer who plays as a forward.

== Club career ==
=== Early career ===
Born in Campana, Buenos Aires, Blandi began his career at the age of five at Escuela de Fútbol Infantil (EFI), a footballing school directed by Peter Ithurburu, as a central midfielder. In 2000, aged ten, he moved to Puerto Nuevo, representing the club for one year before joining Villa Dálmine.

In 2002, Blandi joined Chacarita Juniors' youth setup, now already a forward. He played for the side for three seasons before moving to Boca Juniors at the age of 15.

=== Boca Juniors ===
In May 2010, after impressing with the reserve team, Blandi was called up to the main squad ahead of a pre-season tour in the United States. He made his first-team debut on 24 May in a 1–0 loss at Los Angeles Galaxy, and scored his first goal five days later in a 3–2 defeat to Portland Timbers.

==== Loan to Argentinos Juniors ====
In July 2010, Blandi was loaned to fellow Primera División side Argentinos Juniors, for one year. He made his professional debut on 16 August, starting in a 1–1 away draw against Independiente.

Blandi scored his first professional goal on 14 November 2010, netting the game's only in a home success over San Lorenzo. He scored six goals in 25 appearances for the club.

==== Return to Boca ====
Returning to Boca ahead the 2011–12 campaign, Blandi was initially listed for loan by manager Julio César Falcioni, but remained in the squad after impressing during the pre-season. He made his official debut for the club on 23 September 2011, in a 1–0 home win against Estudiantes.

Blandi scored his first official goals for the club on 26 October 2011, netting a brace in a 2–0 away success over Colón. He was regularly used during the season, mainly as a backup to Pablo Mouche and Darío Cvitanich, and beat off competition from Orlando Gaona Lugo, Sergio Araujo and injured Lucas Viatri.

Blandi continued to feature mainly as a backup option in the following seasons.

=== San Lorenzo ===
On 13 January 2014, Blandi joined San Lorenzo on three-year contract, for a fee of US$ 1.8 million for 50% of his federative rights. He made his debut for the club on 8 February in a 1–0 away loss against Olimpo, and scored his first goal eight days later in a 1–0 home defeat of Racing Club.

He was a part of the squad who lifted the 2014 Copa Libertadores, acting mainly as a rotation option with Mauro Matos and Martín Cauteruccio.

==== Loan to Evian TG ====
On 17 January 2015, Blandi was loaned to Ligue 1 side Evian Thonon Gaillard for six months. After struggling with an injury in his first two months, he made his debut for the club on 21 March by replacing Mathieu Duhamel in a 1–0 home win against Montpellier HSC.

Blandi scored his first goal abroad on 18 April 2015, netting the equalizer in a 1–1 away draw against EA Guingamp. He contributed with six appearances during his spell, as his side suffered relegation.

==== Return from loan ====
Upon returning Blandi remained as a backup during the remainder of the 2015 season, but was a regular starter during the 2016 campaign. He scored eight goals during the latter year, including braces against Olimpo and River Plate.

On 1 August 2016, San Lorenzo bought the remaining 50% rights of Blandi.

== Career statistics ==
As of 26 July 2018

Appearances and goals by club, season and competition
Club	Season	League			Cup		Continental		Other		Total	
Club	Season	Division	Apps	Goals	Apps	Goals	Apps	Goals	Apps	Goals	Apps	Goals
Argentinos Juniors (loan)	2010–11	Primera División	25	6	—		2 (Note: One appearance in Copa Sudamericana, one appearance in Copa Libertadores)	0	—		27	6
Boca Juniors	2011–12	Primera División	15	6	4	2	4 (Note: Appearance(s) in Copa Libertadores)	1	—		23	9
Boca Juniors	2012–13	Primera División	18	4	2	2	8 (Note: Seven appearances and two goals in Copa Libertadores, one appearance in Copa Sudamericana)	2	0	0	28	8
Boca Juniors	2013–14	Primera División	10	3	0	0	0	0	—		10	3
Boca Juniors	Total		43	13	6	4	12	3	0	0	61	20
San Lorenzo	2013–14	Primera División	12	4	2	0	0	0	—		14	4
San Lorenzo	2014	Primera División	14	0	0	0	7	1	0	0	21	1
San Lorenzo	2015	Primera División	6	2	2	0	0	0	—		8	2
San Lorenzo	2016	Primera División	14	8	0	0	3	1	1 (Note: Appearance(s) in Supercopa Argentina)	1	18	10
San Lorenzo	2016–17	Primera División	23	11	3	3	14 (Note: Eight appearances and five goals in Copa Sudamericana, six appearances and three goals in Copa Libertadores)	8	—		40	22
San Lorenzo	2017–18	Primera División	22	9	2	0	5 (Note: Four appearances and two goals in Copa Libertadores, one appearance in Copa Sudamericana)	2	—		29	11
San Lorenzo	2018–19	Primera División	0	0	0	0	1 (Note: Appearance(s) in Copa Sudamericana)	1	—		1	1
San Lorenzo	Total		91	34	9	3	30	13	1	1	131	51
Evian TG (loan)	2014–15	Ligue 1	6	1	—		—		—		6	1
Evian TG B (loan)	2014–15	CFA 2	1	0	—		—		—		1	0
Career totals			166	54	15	7	44	16	1	1	226	78

== Honours ==
Boca Juniors

- Primera División: 2011 Apertura
- Copa Argentina: 2012

San Lorenzo

- Copa Libertadores: 2014
- Supercopa Argentina: 2015

Colo-Colo

- Copa Chile: 2019
