= 2017 Copa Libertadores finals =

- Promotional poster of the first leg
- Event: 2017 Copa Libertadores de América
Grêmio	Lanús
(Brazil)	(Argentina)
3	1
- on aggregate

First leg
Grêmio	Lanús
1	0
- Date: 22 November 2017
- Venue: Arena do Grêmio, Porto Alegre
- Referee: Julio Bascuñán (Chile)
- Attendance: 55,188

Second leg
Lanús	Grêmio
1	2
- Date: 29 November 2017
- Venue: Estadio Ciudad de Lanús, Lanús
- Referee: Enrique Cáceres (Paraguay)
- Attendance: 45,000

The 2017 Copa Libertadores finals were the two-legged final that decided the winner of the 2017 Copa Libertadores de América, the 58th edition of the Copa Libertadores de América, South America's premier international club football tournament organized by CONMEBOL.

The finals were contested in two-legged home-and-away format between Brazilian team Grêmio and Argentinian team Lanús. The first leg was hosted by Grêmio at Arena do Grêmio in Porto Alegre on 22 November 2017, while the second leg was hosted by Lanús at Estadio Ciudad de Lanús in Lanús on 29 November 2017.

Starting this season, the final matches was held again in November, 35 years since the previous November finals, in 1982.

The winners of the 2017 Copa Libertadores qualified as the CONMEBOL representative at the 2017 FIFA Club World Cup in the United Arab Emirates, and also earned the right to play against the winners of the 2017 Copa Sudamericana in the 2018 Recopa Sudamericana. They also automatically qualified for the 2018 Copa Libertadores group stage.

Grêmio defeated Lanús 3–1 on aggregate to win their third Copa Libertadores title.

== Teams ==
Team	Previous finals appearances (bold indicates winners)
(Brazil) Grêmio	4 (**1983**, 1984, **1995**, 2007)
(Argentina) Lanús	None

== Venues ==
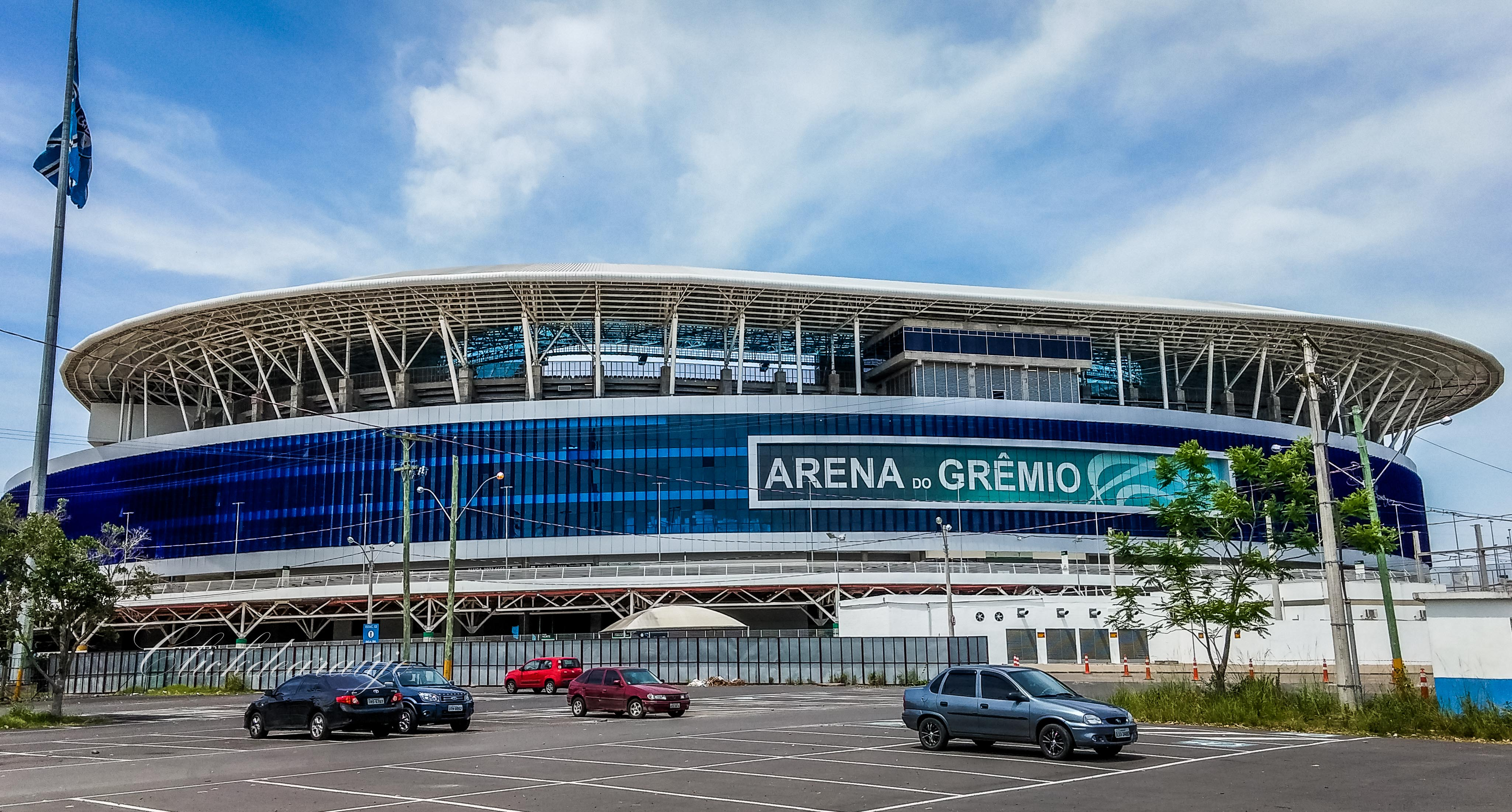
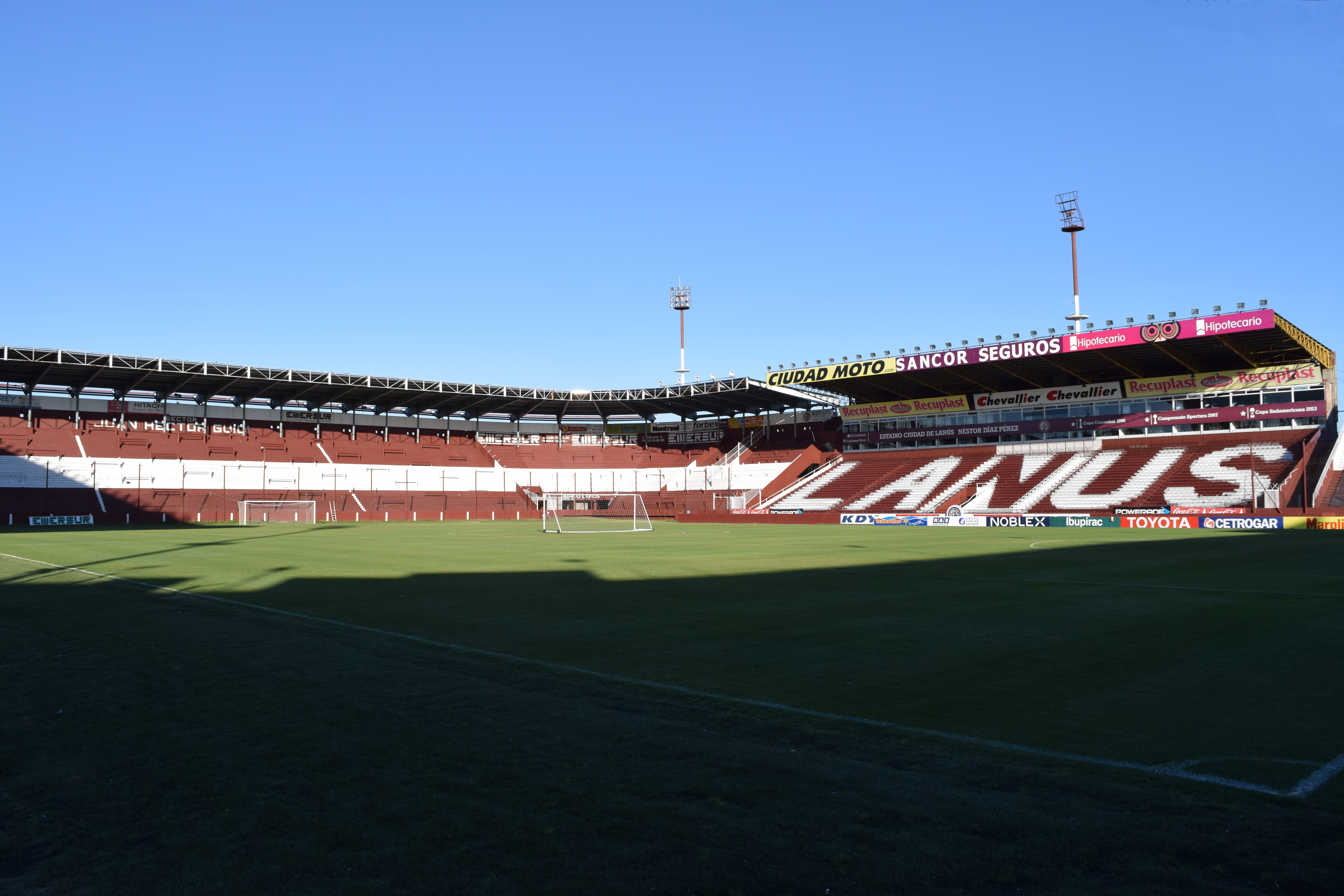
Arena do Grêmio in Porto Alegre and Ciudad de Lanús Stadium in Lanús, venues for the finals

== Road to the final ==
Note: In all scores below, the score of the home team is given first.

(Brazil) Grêmio			Round	(Argentina) Lanús		
Opponent	Venue	Score		Opponent	Venue	Score
Bye			Qualifying stages	Bye		
**Group 8**			Group stage	**Group 7**		
(Venezuela) Zamora	Away	0–2	Group stage	(Uruguay) Nacional	Home	0–1
(Chile) Deportes Iquique	Home	3–2	Group stage	(Brazil) Chapecoense	Away	1–3
(Paraguay) Guaraní	Away	1–1	Group stage	(Venezuela) Zulia	Home	5–0
(Paraguay) Guaraní	Home	4–1	Group stage	(Venezuela) Zulia	Away	1–1
(Chile) Deportes Iquique	Away	2–1	Group stage	(Brazil) Chapecoense	Home	3–0; Awarded (Note: CONMEBOL awarded Lanús a 3–0 win as a result of Chapecoense fielding the ineligible player Luiz Otávio. The match originally ended 1–2.)
(Venezuela) Zamora	Home	4–0	Group stage	(Uruguay) Nacional	Away	0–1
Pos / Team / Pld / Pts; **1** / (Brazil) Grêmio / **6** / **13**; 2 / (Paraguay) Guaraní / 6 / **11**; 3 / (Chile) Deportes Iquique / 6 / **10**; 4 / (Venezuela) Zamora / 6 / **0**; Source: CONMEBOL			Group stage	Pos / Team / Pld / Pts; **1** / (Argentina) Lanús / **6** / **13**; 2 / (Uruguay) Nacional / 6 / **8**; 3 / (Brazil) Chapecoense / 6 / **7**; 4 / (Venezuela) Zulia / 6 / **5**; Source: CONMEBOL		
**Seed 3**			Final stages	**Seed 2**		
(Argentina) Godoy Cruz (won 3–1 on aggregate)	Away	0–1	Round of 16	(Bolivia) The Strongest (won 2–1 on aggregate)	Away	1–1
(Argentina) Godoy Cruz (won 3–1 on aggregate)	Home	2–1	Round of 16	(Bolivia) The Strongest (won 2–1 on aggregate)	Home	1–0
(Brazil) Botafogo (won 1–0 on aggregate)	Away	0–0	Quarterfinals	(Argentina) San Lorenzo (tied 2–2 on aggregate, won 4–3 on penalties)	Away	2–0
(Brazil) Botafogo (won 1–0 on aggregate)	Home	1–0	Quarterfinals	(Argentina) San Lorenzo (tied 2–2 on aggregate, won 4–3 on penalties)	Home	2–0
(Ecuador) Barcelona (won 3–1 on aggregate)	Away	0–3	Semifinals	(Argentina) River Plate (won 4–3 on aggregate)	Away	1–0
(Ecuador) Barcelona (won 3–1 on aggregate)	Home	0–1	Semifinals	(Argentina) River Plate (won 4–3 on aggregate)	Home	4–2

== Format ==
The finals were played on a home-and-away two-legged basis, with the higher-seeded team hosting the second leg. If tied on aggregate, the away goals rule would not be used, and 30 minutes of extra time would be played. If still tied after extra time, the penalty shoot-out would be used to determine the winner. If extra time was played, a fourth substitution would be allowed.

== Matches ==
=== First leg ===
Cícero scored the only goal in the 82nd minute with a left foot shot from six yards out after Jael headed the ball on to him inside the penalty box.

22 November 2017
21:45 UTC−2

Grêmio (Brazil)	1–0	(Argentina) Lanús
Cícero 82'	Report

Arena do Grêmio, Porto Alegre
Attendance: 55,188
Referee: Julio Bascuñán (Chile)

**Grêmio**	**Lanús**

GK	1	(Brazil) Marcelo Grohe
RB	2	(Brazil) Edílson
CB	3	(Brazil) Pedro Geromel (c)
CB	4	(Argentina) Walter Kannemann	(yellow card) 40'
LB	12	(Brazil) Bruno Cortez
CM	25	(Brazil) Jailson	(yellow card) 43'	(substituted off) 71'
CM	29	(Brazil) Arthur
RW	17	(Brazil) Ramiro
AM	7	(Brazil) Luan
LW	21	(Brazil) Fernandinho		(substituted off) 56'
CF	18	(Paraguay) Lucas Barrios		(substituted off) 73'
Substitutes:
GK	24	(Brazil) Paulo Victor
DF	16	(Brazil) Léo Moura
DF	22	(Brazil) Bressan
MF	5	(Brazil) Michel
MF	27	(Brazil) Cícero	(yellow card) 73'	(substituted on) 71'
FW	9	(Brazil) Jael		(substituted on) 73'
FW	11	(Brazil) Éverton		(substituted on) 56'
Manager:
(Brazil) Renato Portaluppi

GK	28	(Argentina) Esteban Andrada
RB	4	(Argentina) José Luis Gómez
CB	23	(Paraguay) Rolando García Guerreño	(yellow card) 40'
CB	6	(Argentina) Diego Braghieri	(yellow card) 90+4'
LB	3	(Argentina) Maximiliano Velázquez (c)	(yellow card) 75'	(substituted off) 78'
RM	10	(Argentina) Román Martínez
CM	30	(Argentina) Iván Marcone
LM	21	(Argentina) Nicolás Pasquini
RW	16	(Uruguay) Alejandro Silva
CF	9	(Argentina) José Sand
LW	7	(Argentina) Lautaro Acosta	(yellow card) 23'
Substitutes:
GK	1	(Argentina) Fernando Monetti
DF	2	(Argentina) Marcelo Herrera
DF	22	(Argentina) Santiago Zurbriggen
MF	19	(Argentina) Nicolás Aguirre		(substituted on) 78'
MF	24	(Argentina) Leandro Maciel
FW	17	(Argentina) Germán Denis
FW	25	(Argentina) Marcelino Moreno
Manager:
(Argentina) Jorge Almirón

Assistant referees:
Carlos Astroza (Chile)
Christian Schiemann (Chile)
Fourth official:
Diego Haro (Peru)
VAR:
Jesús Valenzuela (Venezuela)
AVAR:
Roddy Zambrano (Ecuador)
VAR2:
Christian Lescano (Ecuador)

=== Second leg ===
Diego Braghieri (Lanús) and Walter Kannemann (Grêmio) missed the second leg after picking up a yellow card in the first leg.

Grêmio scored twice before half-time. Fernandinho stole the ball in Gremio's half, ran freely toward Andrada's goal and hammered it home from the edge of the box in the 26th minute. In the end of the first half, Luan dribbled through two Lanus defenders and lobbied the ball gently into the net. In the second half, José Sand scored from the penalty spot in the 71st minute.

29 November 2017
20:45 UTC−3

Lanús (Argentina)	1–2	(Brazil) Grêmio
Sand 71' (pen.)	Report	Fernandinho 26'; Luan 41'

Estadio Ciudad de Lanús, Lanús
Attendance: 45,000
Referee: Enrique Cáceres (Paraguay)

**Lanús**	**Grêmio**

GK	28	(Argentina) Esteban Andrada
RB	4	(Argentina) José Luis Gómez
CB	2	(Argentina) Marcelo Herrera		(substituted off) 65'
CB	23	(Paraguay) Rolando García Guerreño	(yellow card) 5'
LB	3	(Argentina) Maximiliano Velázquez (c)	(yellow card) 20'	(substituted off) 87'
RM	10	(Argentina) Román Martínez
CM	30	(Argentina) Iván Marcone
LM	21	(Argentina) Nicolás Pasquini
RW	16	(Uruguay) Alejandro Silva	(yellow card) 70'	(substituted off) 77'
CF	9	(Argentina) José Sand
LW	7	(Argentina) Lautaro Acosta
Substitutes:
GK	1	(Argentina) Fernando Monetti
DF	22	(Argentina) Santiago Zurbriggen
MF	14	(Paraguay) Matías Rojas		(substituted on) 77'
MF	19	(Argentina) Nicolás Aguirre
MF	24	(Argentina) Leandro Maciel
FW	17	(Argentina) Germán Denis		(substituted on) 87'
FW	25	(Argentina) Marcelino Moreno		(substituted on) 65'
Manager:
(Argentina) Jorge Almirón

GK	1	(Brazil) Marcelo Grohe	(yellow card) 90+1'
RB	2	(Brazil) Edílson	(yellow card) 25'
CB	3	(Brazil) Pedro Geromel (c)
CB	22	(Brazil) Bressan		(substituted off) 81'
LB	12	(Brazil) Bruno Cortez	(yellow card) 70'
CM	25	(Brazil) Jailson	(yellow card) 70'
CM	29	(Brazil) Arthur		(substituted off) 51'
RW	17	(Brazil) Ramiro	(yellow card) 82' (red card) 82'
AM	7	(Brazil) Luan
LW	21	(Brazil) Fernandinho
CF	18	(Paraguay) Lucas Barrios		(substituted off) 75'
Substitutes:
GK	24	(Brazil) Paulo Victor
DF	15	(Brazil) Rafael Thyere		(substituted on) 81'
DF	16	(Brazil) Léo Moura
MF	5	(Brazil) Michel		(substituted on) 51'
MF	27	(Brazil) Cícero		(substituted on) 75'
FW	9	(Brazil) Jael
FW	11	(Brazil) Éverton
Manager:
(Brazil) Renato Portaluppi

Assistant referees:
Eduardo Cardozo (Paraguay)
Juan Zorrilla (Paraguay)
Fourth official:
Éber Aquino (Paraguay)
VAR:
Mario Díaz de Vivar (Paraguay)
AVAR:
Víctor Carrillo (Peru)
VAR2:
Milcíades Saldívar (Paraguay)

== See also ==
- 2017 Copa Sudamericana finals
- 2018 Recopa Sudamericana
