= 2016 Copa Bicentenario =

Copa del Bicentenario de la Independencia
- The trophy awarded
- Organiser(s): AFA
- Founded: 2016
- Abolished: 2016; 10 years ago
- Region: Argentina
- Teams: 2
- Qualifier for: Copa Sudamericana
- Related competitions: Primera División
- Last champions: Lanús

The Copa del Bicentenario de la Independencia was an official Argentine football cup competition organized by the Argentine Football Association (AFA), being contested by the 2014 Torneo de Transición champions, Racing and the 2016 champions, Lanús.

A draw by AFA was held to decide the home team (Racing). The trophy was named to honour the 200th. anniversary of the Independence of Argentina.

Lanús beat Racing 1–0 in Avellaneda in injury time and won the trophy. As champions, Lanús qualified to the 2017 Copa Sudamericana.

== Venue ==
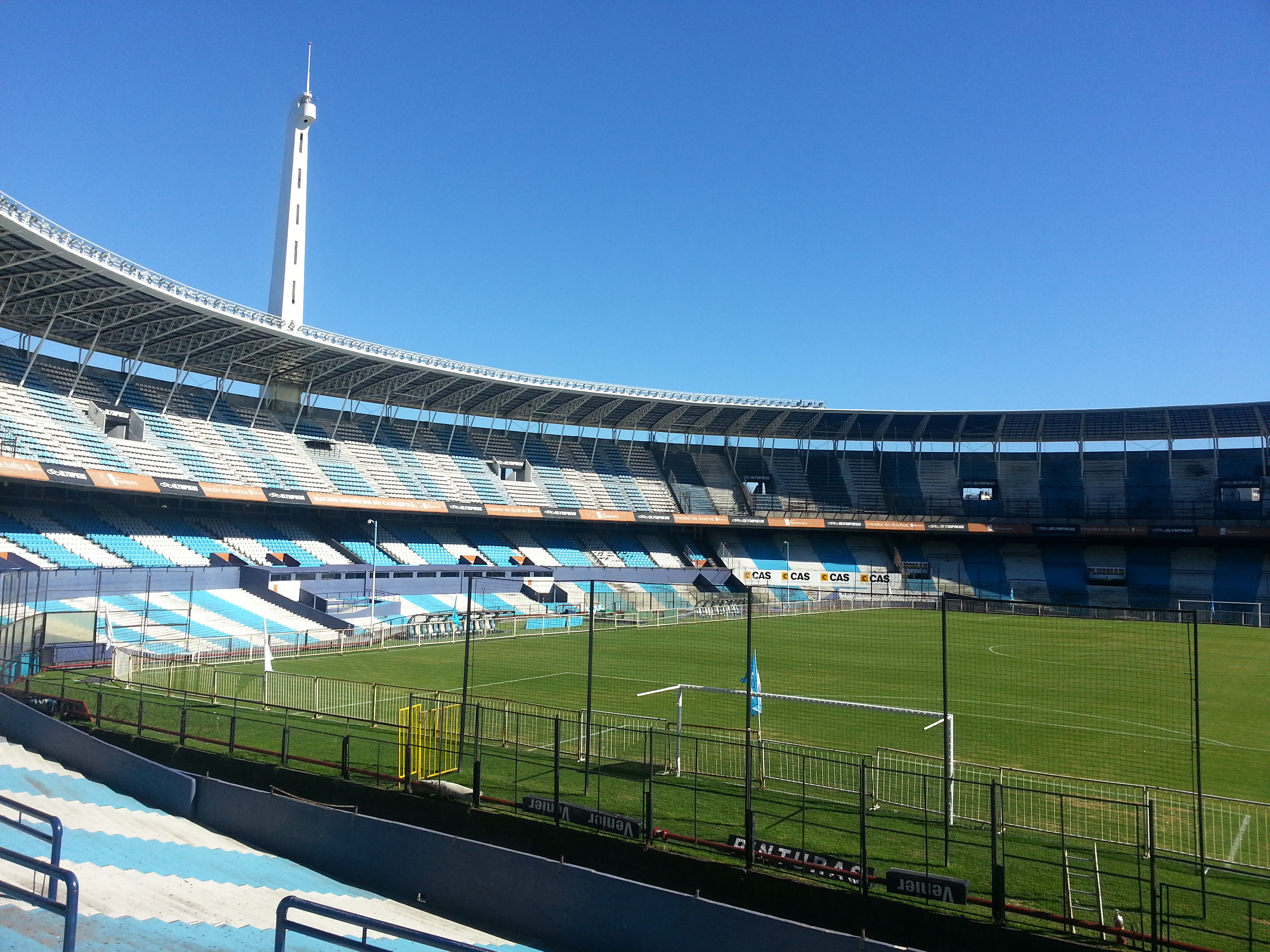
El Cilindro in Avellaneda, hosted the final.

== Match ==
=== Details ===
14 August 2016
16:00 UTC−3

Racing	0–1	Lanús
	Report	Montenegro 90+1'

El Cilindro, Avellaneda
Referee: Germán Delfino

Racing	Lanús

GK	21	(Argentina) Nelson Ibáñez
DF	18	(Argentina) Francisco Cerro
DF	2	(Argentina) Nicolás Sánchez
DF	3	(Argentina) Leandro Grimi	(yellow card) 32'
DF	13	(Argentina) Emanuel Insúa	(yellow card) 89'
MF	17	(Argentina) Marcos Acuña	(yellow card) 27'
MF	15	(Argentina) Ezequiel Videla	(yellow card) 30'	(substituted off) 61'
MF	11	(Argentina) Luciano Aued	(yellow card) 54'
FW	10	(Paraguay) Óscar Romero	(yellow card) 15'
FW	9	(Argentina) Lisandro López (c)
FW	7	(Argentina) Gustavo Bou
Substitutes:
GK	12	(Argentina) Juan Musso
DF	26	(Argentina) Miguel Barbieri
DF	20	(Argentina) Sergio Vittor
MF	6	(Paraguay) Willian Candia
MF	8	(Argentina) Diego González		(substituted on) 61'
FW	32	(Argentina) Lautaro Martínez
FW	19	(Argentina) Brian Mansilla
Manager:
(Argentina) Facundo Sava

GK	12	(Argentina) Matías Ibáñez
DF	4	(Argentina) José Luis Gómez
DF	14	(Argentina) Marcelo Herrera	(yellow card) 86'
DF	6	(Argentina) Diego Braghieri
DF	21	(Argentina) Nicolás Pasquini	(yellow card) 52'
MF	27	(Argentina) Román Martínez	(yellow card) 32'
MF	30	(Argentina) Iván Marcone	(yellow card) 79'
MF	19	(Argentina) Nicolás Aguirre		(substituted off) 73'
FW	7	(Argentina) Lautaro Acosta
FW	9	(Argentina) José Sand (c)	(yellow card) 34'
FW	10	(Paraguay) Miguel Almirón
Substitutes:
GK	31	(Argentina) Esteban Andrada
DF	17	(Argentina) Rodrigo Erramuspe
DF	16	(Uruguay) Alejandro Silva
MF	13	(Argentina) Marcos Pinto
MF	5	(Argentina) Agustín Pelletieri
FW	25	(Argentina) Marcelino Moreno
FW	26	(Paraguay) Brian Montenegro		(substituted on) 73'
Manager:
(Argentina) Jorge Almirón

Assistant referees:
Diego Bonfá
Ezequiel Brailovsky
Fourth official:
Diego Abal

Match rules

- 90 minutes.
- Penalty shoot-out if necessary.
- Seven named substitutes, of which up to three may be used.

=== Statistics ===
Overall
	Racing	Lanús
Goals scored	0	1
Total shots	10	9
Shots on target	3	5
Ball possession	48	52
Corner kicks	6	10
Fouls committed	18	18
Offsides	3	2
Yellow cards	6	5
Red cards	0	0

Copa del Bicentenario winners
Lanús
