= 2019 Supercopa Argentina =

- Promotional poster of the final
- Event: Supercopa Argentina
Racing Club	River Plate
0	5
- Date: 4 March 2021
- Venue: Estadio Único Madre de Ciudades, Santiago del Estero
- Man of the Match: Enzo Pérez
- Referee: Darío Herrera
- Attendance: 0 (Behind closed doors)

The 2019 Supercopa Argentina was the eighth edition of the Supercopa Argentina, an annual football match played between the winners of the Argentine Primera División and Copa Argentina. The match was contested by the 2018–19 Primera División champions Racing Club and the 2018–19 Copa Argentina winners River Plate on 4 March 2021 at the Estadio Único Madre de Ciudades, Santiago del Estero. River Plate were appearing in the competition for the fourth time, while Racing Club were making their first appearance.

Racing Club qualified as a result of winning the Argentine Primera División, finishing four points ahead of the second-placed team. River Plate entered the competition after winning the Copa Argentina final against Central Córdoba (SdE) 3–0.

The match, played behind closed doors, was opened by River Plate's Rafael Santos Borré at the half-hour mark. They extended their lead in the second half when Julián Alvarez and Nicolás de la Cruz scored within a minute. Shortly after, an own goal from Leonel Miranda added one further, before Matías Suárez closed out the scoring ten minutes away from stoppage time. Following a 5–0 rout, River Plate secured their second Supercopa Argentina title.

== Background ==
Founded in 2012, the Supercopa Argentina was established as a contest between the Primera División champions and Copa Argentina winners, taking inspiration from its European variations. The annual football match was originally meant for the champions of the latter competition and the Copa Campeonato, which paired the Torneo Inicial and Torneo Final winners, as single tournaments with only one champion per season were not held in Argentina. The top division was later changed to have 30 teams compete during the 2015 season, effectively ending the purpose of the Copa Campeonato. From that year until 2025, whichever team won the league title qualified for the Supercopa Argentina as the league reigning champions.

== Qualified teams ==
Team	Qualification	Previous appearances
Racing Club	2018–19 Primera División champions	None
River Plate	2018–19 Copa Argentina champions	3 (2014, 2016, **2017**)

Note

- **Bold** indicates winning years

== Match ==
=== Details ===
4 March 2021
22:10 UTC−3

Racing Club	0–5	River Plate
	Report	Borré 30'; Álvarez 68'; De La Cruz 69'; Miranda 72' (o.g.); Suárez 80'

Estadio Único Madre de Ciudades, Santiago del Estero
Attendance: 0
Referee: Darío Herrera

**Racing**	**River Plate**

GK	1	(Chile) Gabriel Arias (c)
DF	8	(Uruguay) Fabricio Domínguez
DF	30	(Argentina) Leonardo Sigali	(yellow card) 59'	(substituted off) 77'
DF	40	(Argentina) Joaquín Novillo
DF	35	(Paraguay) Lorenzo Melgarejo
MF	23	(Argentina) Nery Domínguez	(yellow card) 7'	(substituted off) 65'
MF	19	(Argentina) Leonel Miranda
MF	28	(Argentina) Tomás Chancalay		(substituted off) 86'
MF	10	(Paraguay) Matías Rojas		(substituted off) 65'
FW	9	(Argentina) Enzo Copetti
FW	22	(Argentina) Nicolás Reniero		(substituted off) 46'
Substitutes:
GK	13	(Argentina) Matias Tagliamonte
GK	25	(Argentina) Gastón Gómez
DF	2	(Argentina) Juan José Cáceres
DF	3	(Argentina) Alexis Soto
DF	4	(Argentina) Iván Pillud
DF	18	(Italy) Ezequiel Schelotto		(substituted on) 86'
MF	15	(Argentina) Ignacio Piatti		(substituted on) 65'
MF	16	(Argentina) Mauricio Martínez		(substituted on) 77'
MF	26	(Argentina) Carlos Alcaraz
MF	29	(Argentina) Aníbal Moreno		(substituted on) 46'
FW	20	(Argentina) Darío Cvitanich		(substituted on) 65'
FW	34	(Argentina) Maximiliano Lovera
Manager:
(Spain) Juan Antonio Pizzi

GK	1	(Argentina) Franco Armani (c)
DF	17	(Chile) Paulo Díaz	(yellow card) 17'
DF	2	(Paraguay) Robert Rojas
DF	6	(Argentina) Héctor Martínez
MF	20	(Argentina) Milton Casco
MF	24	(Argentina) Enzo Pérez		(substituted off) 81'
MF	3	(Argentina) Fabrizio Angileri
MF	11	(Uruguay) Nicolás De La Cruz		(substituted off) 81'
MF	10	(Colombia) Jorge Carrascal		(substituted off) 60'
FW	19	(Colombia) Rafael Santos Borré		(substituted off) 66'
FW	7	(Argentina) Matías Suárez		(substituted off) 81'
Substitutes:
GK	14	(Argentina) Germán Lux
GK	25	(Argentina) Enrique Bologna
DF	4	(Argentina) Jonatan Maidana
DF	16	(Argentina) Alex Vigo
MF	5	(Argentina) Bruno Zuculini		(substituted on) 81'
MF	8	(Argentina) Agustín Palavecino		(substituted on) 60'
MF	23	(Argentina) Leonardo Ponzio		(substituted on) 81'
MF	26	(Argentina) José Paradela
FW	9	(Argentina) Julián Álvarez		(substituted on) 66'
FW	15	(Argentina) Federico Girotti		(substituted on) 81'
FW	18	(Argentina) Lucas Beltrán
FW	27	(Argentina) Agustín Fontana
Manager:
(Argentina) Marcelo Gallardo

**Assistant referees**
Diego Bonfá
Ezequiel Brailovsky
**Fourth official**
Hernán Mastrángelo
**Fifth official**
Gisela Trucco

**Match rules**

- 90 minutes.
- Penalty shoot-out if scores still level.
- Twelve named substitutes.
- Maximum of five substitutions.

=== Statistics ===
Overall
Statistic	Racing Club	River Plate
Goals scored	0	5
Total shots	7	15
Shots on target	5	8
Ball possession	47%	53%
Corner kicks	4	8
Fouls committed	15	11
Offsides	0	5
Yellow cards	2	1
Red cards	0	0

2019 Supercopa Argentina winners
**River Plate**
**2nd Title**
