= 2016 Supercopa Argentina =

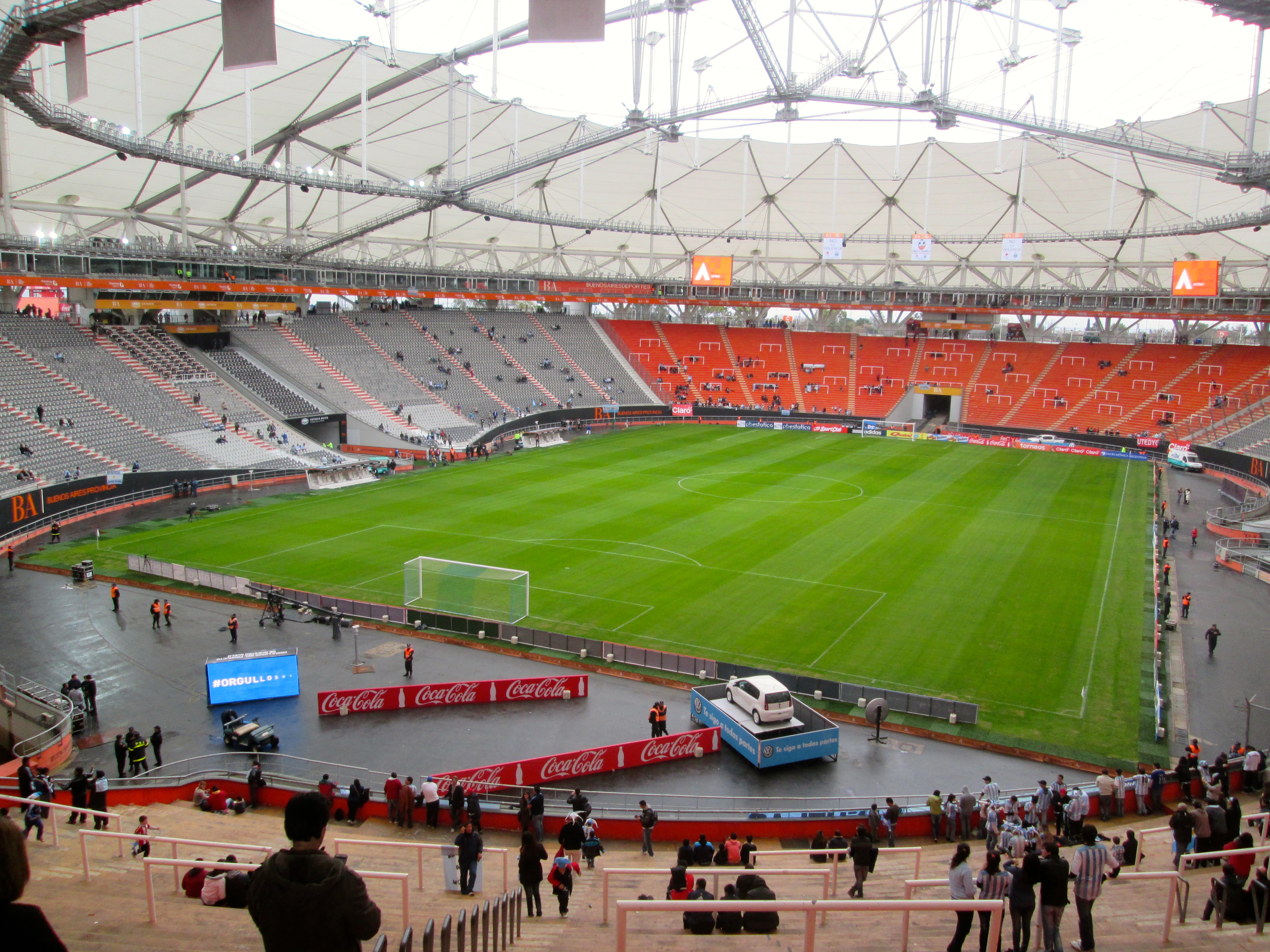
- Estadio Único de La Plata, venue
Lanús	River Plate
3	0
- Date: February 4, 2017
- Venue: Estadio Ciudad de La Plata, La Plata
- Man of the Match: Lautaro Acosta
- Referee: Germán Delfino

The 2016 Supercopa Argentina Final (officially the Supercopa Argentina 2016 "Burger King" for sponsorship reasons) was the 5th edition of the Supercopa Argentina, an annual football match contested by the winners of the Argentine Primera División and Copa Argentina competitions. Lanús beat River Plate 3–0 in La Plata and won the trophy.

== Qualified teams ==
Team	Qualification	Previous appearances (bold indicates winners)
Lanús	2016 Primera División champion	None
River Plate	2015–16 Copa Argentina champion	1 (2014)

== Match ==
=== Details ===
2016 Supercopa Argentina Final
February 4, 2017
21:30 UTC−3

Lanús	3–0	River Plate
Acosta 70'; Pasquini 80'; Sand 88' (pen.)	Report

Estadio Ciudad de La Plata, La Plata
Referee: Germán Delfino

**Lanús**	**River Plate**

GK	31	(Argentina) Esteban Andrada
DF	4	(Argentina) José Luis Gómez	(yellow card) 41'
DF	2	(Argentina) Marcelo Herrera	(yellow card) 41'	(substituted off) 80'
DF	6	(Argentina) Diego Braghieri
DF	3	(Argentina) Maximiliano Velázquez (c)	(yellow card) 18'
MF	10	(Argentina) Román Martínez
MF	30	(Argentina) Iván Marcone
MF	19	(Argentina) Nicolás Aguirre	(yellow card) 56'	(substituted off) 61'
FW	16	(Uruguay) Alejandro Silva		(substituted off) 86'
FW	9	(Argentina) José Sand	(yellow card) 89'
FW	7	(Argentina) Lautaro Acosta
Substitutes:
GK	12	(Argentina) Nicolás Avellaneda
DF	20	(Argentina) Facundo Monteseirín		(substituted on) 80'
DF	17	(Argentina) Rodrigo Erramuspe		(substituted on) 86'
MF	21	(Argentina) Nicolás Pasquini		(substituted on) 61'
MF	5	(Argentina) Agustín Pelletieri
MF	8	(Argentina) Fernando Barrientos
FW	25	(Argentina) Marcelino Moreno
Manager:
(Argentina) Jorge Almirón

GK	1	(Argentina) Augusto Batalla
DF	4	(Paraguay) Jorge Moreira	(yellow card) 68'
DF	2	(Argentina) Jonatan Maidana	(yellow card) 46'
DF	28	(Argentina) Lucas Martínez Quarta
DF	20	(Argentina) Milton Casco	(yellow card) 27'
MF	18	(Uruguay) Camilo Mayada	(yellow card) 29'	(substituted off) 71'
MF	23	(Argentina) Leonardo Ponzio (c)
MF	26	(Argentina) Ignacio Fernández
MF	10	(Argentina) Gonzalo Martínez
FW	11	(Argentina) Sebastián Driussi
FW	7	(Uruguay) Rodrigo Mora		(substituted off) 68'
Substitutes:
GK	25	(Argentina) Enrique Bologna
DF	3	(Ecuador) Arturo Mina
DF	30	(Argentina) Luis Olivera
MF	21	(Argentina) Iván Rossi
MF	14	(Argentina) Joaquín Arzura
MF	35	(Argentina) Tomás Andrade		(substituted on) 71'
FW	17	(Argentina) Carlos Auzqui		(substituted on) 68'
Manager:
(Argentina) Marcelo Gallardo

Assistant referees:
Sergio Zoratti
Sergio Viola
Fourth official:
Diego Abal

**Match rules**

- 90 minutes.
- Penalty shoot-out if scores still level.
- Seven named substitutes.
- Maximum of three substitutions.

=== Statistics ===
Overall
	Lanús	River Plate
Goals scored	3	0
Total shots	14	11
Shots on target	4	2
Ball possession	45%	55%
Corner kicks	3	7
Fouls committed	14	14
Offsides	2	0
Yellow cards	5	4
Red cards	0	0

2016 Supercopa Argentina winners
**Lanús**
**1st Title**
