= 2012 Supercopa Argentina =

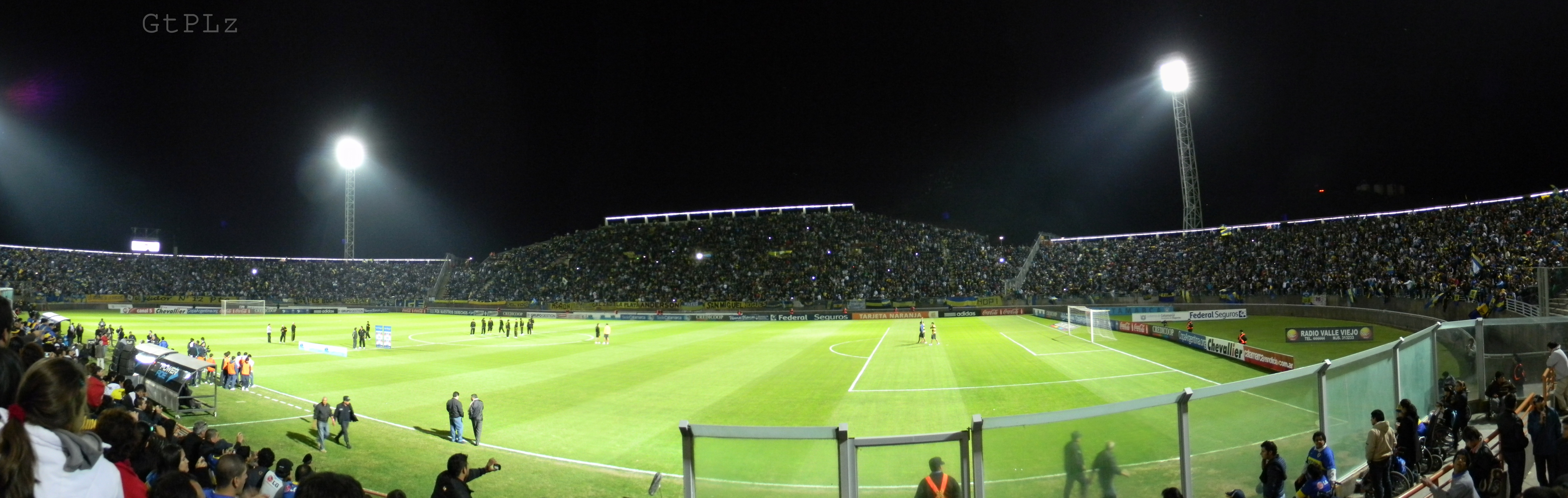
- Estadio Bicentenario of Catamarca, venue
Boca Juniors	Arsenal
0	0
- Arsenal won 4–3 on penalties
- Date: 7 November 2012
- Venue: Estadio Bicentenario, Catamarca
- Referee: Pablo Lunati
- Weather: Clear; 29 °C (84 °F)

The 2012 Supercopa Argentina Final was the 1st edition of the Supercopa, an annual football match contested by the winners of the previous season's Argentine Primera División and Copa Argentina competitions.

The match was held in the Estadio Bicentenario of Catamarca, where Arsenal de Sarandí beat Boca Juniors via penalty shoot-out, winning their first Supercopa title.

== Qualified teams ==
Team	Qualification	Previous app.
Arsenal	2012 Torneo Clausura champion	None
Boca Juniors	2011–12 Copa Argentina champion	None

== Match details ==
2012-11-07
20:30 UTC−3

Boca Juniors	0–0	Arsenal
	Report
Penalties
Silva (penalty scored); Caruzzo (penalty missed); Paredes (penalty missed); G. M. Fernández (penalty scored); Schiavi (penalty scored); Colazo (penalty missed)	3–4	(penalty scored) Canales; (penalty missed) Caffa; (penalty scored) Nervo; (penalty missed) Carbonero; (penalty scored) Zelaya; (penalty scored) Braghieri

Estadio Bicentenario, Catamarca
Referee: Pablo Lunati

Boca Juniors	Arsenal

GK	23	(Argentina) Oscar Ustari
RB	4	(Argentina) Franco Sosa	(substituted off) 69'
CB	2	(Argentina) Rolando Schiavi (c)
CB	20	(Argentina) Guillermo Burdisso
LB	13	(Uruguay) Emiliano Albín	(substituted off) 79'
DM	18	(Argentina) Leandro Somoza	(substituted off) 64'
LMF	11	(Argentina) Walter Erviti
RMF	30	(Argentina) Guillermo Fernández
AM	32	(Argentina) Leandro Paredes
SS	7	(Argentina) Lautaro Acosta
CF	19	(Uruguay) Santiago Silva
Substitutes:
GK	1	(Argentina) Agustín Orión
DF	2	(Argentina) Matías Caruzzo	(substituted on) 79'
MF	22	(Argentina) Cristian Erbes	(substituted on) 64'
MF	15	(Argentina) Nicolás Colazo	(substituted on) 69'
MF	21	(Argentina) Cristian Chávez
FW	17	(Argentina) Nicolás Blandi
FW	9	(Argentina) Lucas Viatri
Manager:
(Argentina) Julio César Falcioni

GK	17	(Argentina) Cristian Campestrini
RB	24	(Argentina) Hugo Nervo	(yellow card) 6'
CB	2	(Argentina) Lisandro López
CB	6	(Argentina) Diego Braghieri
LB	15	(Argentina) Damián Pérez
DM	5	(Argentina) Jorge Ortiz (c)
DM	23	(Argentina) Iván Marcone
LMF	19	(Argentina) Nicolás Aguirre		(substituted off) 90+1'
RMF	10	(Colombia) Carlos Carbonero
CF	11	(Argentina) Emilio Zelaya
CF	9	(Chile) Gustavo Canales
Substitutes:
GK	1	(Argentina) Emiliano Olivero
DF	4	(Argentina) Danilo Gerlo
DF	27	(Argentina) Eduardo Casais
MF	20	(Argentina) Gastón Esmerado
FW	7	(Argentina) Juan Pablo Caffa		(substituted on) 90+1'
FW	21	(Argentina) Pablo Lugüercio
FW	29	(Argentina) Milton Céliz
Manager:
(Argentina) Gustavo Alfaro

Match officials
Assistant referees:
Francisco Noguera
Gustavo Rossi
Fourth official:
Alejandro Toia

Match rules

- 90 minutes.
- Penalty shoot-out if scores still level.
- Seven named substitutes
- Maximum of 3 substitutions.

2012 Supercopa Argentina winners
Arsenal
1st Title
