= 2017 Supercopa Argentina =

- Promotional poster of the final
- Event: Supercopa Argentina
Boca Juniors	River Plate
0	2
- Date: 14 March 2018
- Venue: Estadio Malvinas Argentinas, Mendoza
- Man of the Match: Franco Armani (River Plate)
- Referee: Patricio Loustau
- Attendance: 40,000

The 2017 Supercopa Argentina was the sixth edition of the Supercopa Argentina, an annual football match played between the winners of the Argentine Primera División and Copa Argentina. The match was contested by the 2016–17 Primera División champions Boca Juniors and the 2016–17 Copa Argentina winners River Plate on 14 March 2018 at the Estadio Malvinas Argentinas, Mendoza. Both teams were appearing in the competition for the third time.

Boca Juniors qualified as a result of winning the Primera División, finishing seven points ahead of the second-placed team. River Plate entered the competition after winning the Copa Argentina final against Atlético Tucumán 2–1.

Watched by a crowd of 40,000, Gonzalo Martínez opened the scoring for River Plate in the 18th minute of the match, thanks to a penalty awarded by referee Patricio Loustau. They extended their lead in the second half when Ignacio Scocco scored from a counter-attack. Following a 2–0 scoreline, River Plate secured their first Supercopa Argentina title.

== Background ==
Boca Juniors entered the tournament by winning the 2016–17 Primera División, in which they finished seven points clear of their second-placed rivals. The two sides had played each other twice during that season, with either team winning at each other's home ground: Boca Juniors won 4–2 at the Estadio Monumental, while River Plate earned a 3–1 victory at La Bombonera. River Plate were the holders of the Copa Argentina, having won the final match of the tournament 2–1 against Atlético Tucumán, therefore ensuring their right to participate in the Supercopa.

The match was the first meeting between the two sides in the competition. Boca Juniors were appearing in the Supercopa Argentina for the third time. They had lost their previous two finals – firstly in 2012, when Arsenal de Sarandí beat them 4–3 on penalties after a scoreless draw, and later in 2015, when they lost to San Lorenzo 4–0. River Plate were also making their third appearance in the tournament. They were looking to win their first Supercopa title, having already been denied in the 2014 and 2016 editions against Huracán and Lanús respectively.

== Pre-match ==
It was only the second time in history that the two clubs were to face each other in the decisive match of a tournament. The only other time they had met in such instance was over 41 years prior, when they were paired in the final of the 1976 Torneo Nacional, which went in favour of Boca Juniors 1–0. Boca Juniors seemed to be the overwhelming favourite coming into the game. Their recent showing in the 2017-18 Superliga Argentina was remarkable, as they led the league with a record of 15 victories in 19 matches. In total, the team had been leading the top division for over 500 days. In turn, River Plate had won only three of their last 16 league matches, and were 23 points behind the frontrunners. The latest official meeting between the two teams resulted in a 2–1 win for Boca Juniors, which corresponded to that league's eighth fixture. Even though the odds of winning for Marcelo Gallardo's squad seemed scarce, he declared in a pre-match interview: "The moment in which the teams arrive won't matter. If there had to be a favorite it could be Boca Juniors. But even they know that's not going to be the case."

=== Venue ===
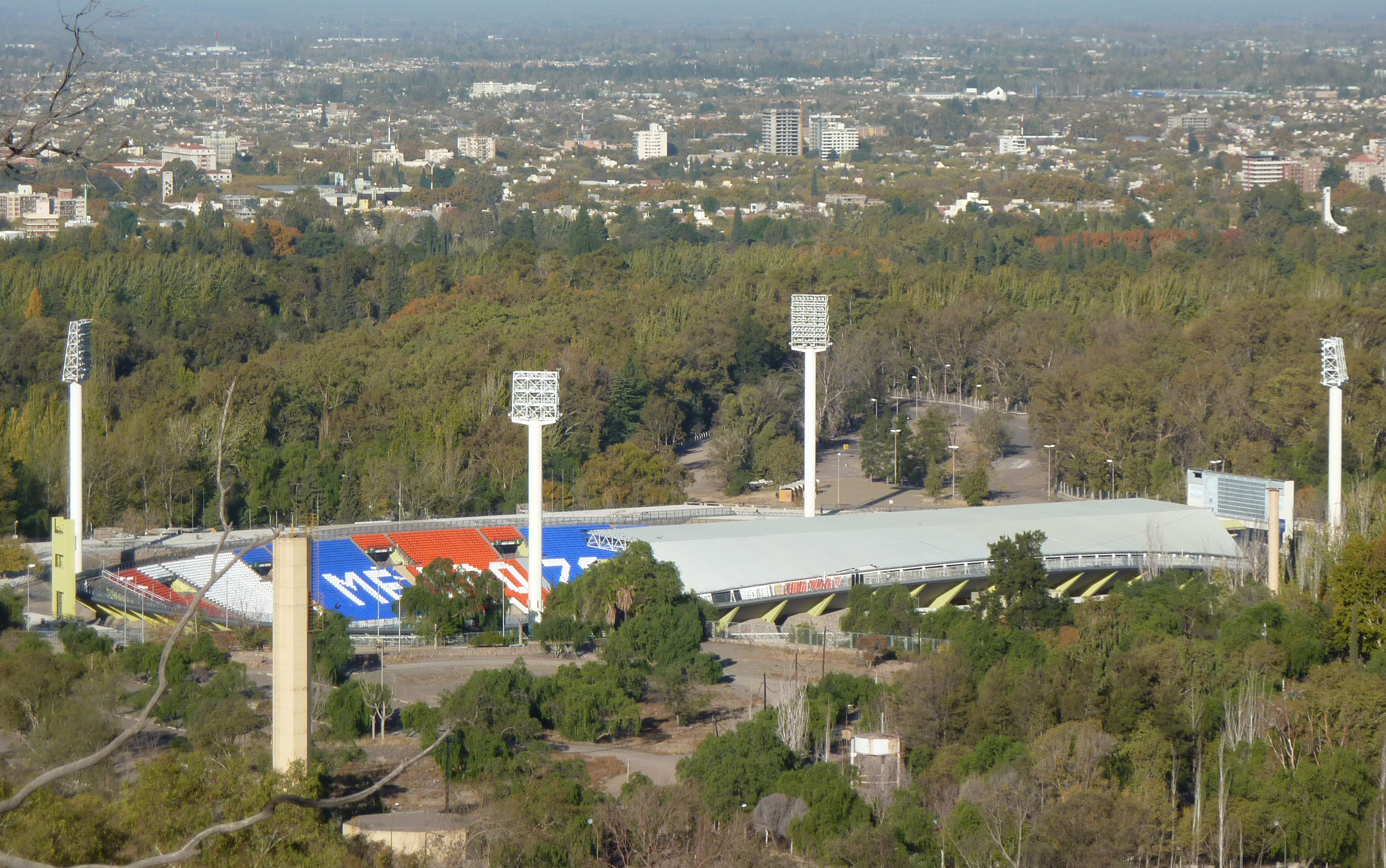
The Estadio Malvinas Argentinas was the venue for the final.

It was confirmed on 7 February 2018 that the sixth edition of the Supercopa Argentina was to take place at the Estadio Malvinas Argentinas, Mendoza. The match was originally scheduled to be hosted at the Estadio Mario Alberto Kempes in Córdoba, but Argentine Football Association president Claudio Tapia announced the change of venue just five weeks prior to the start of the event, citing logistical issues. The poor condition of the field and a major road construction project going on near the stadium were later brought up as reasons for the replacement.

The 42,000-capacity Estadio Malvinas Argentinas opened 14 May 1978. The stadium was built for the FIFA World Cup held in Argentina, during which it hosted six games. It was also one of the eight venues selected for the 2011 Copa América, and had recently been the recipient of the Copa Argentina final in 2017.

== Match ==
=== Summary ===
==== First half ====
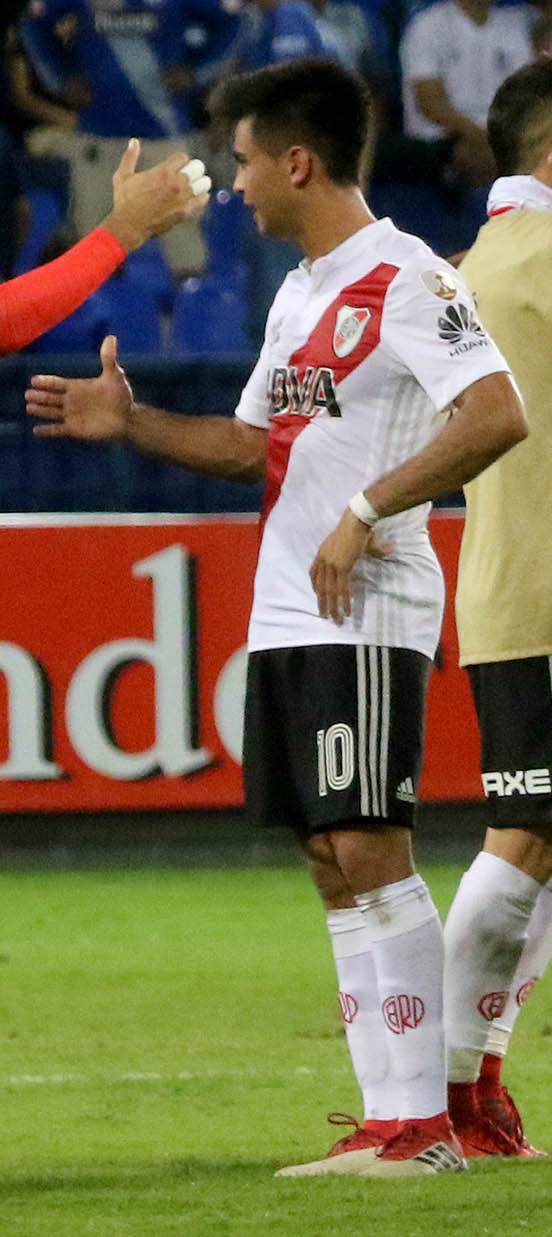
Gonzalo Martínez opened the scoring to the match.

From the start of the match, River Plate pressed high up the field, looking for ball control early in the game. In contrast, Boca Juniors sat with composure, looking to exploit the slowness of the opposing defenders and waiting for any mistake that would leave their forwards with a chance to score. Pablo Pérez was the first player to attempt a shot on target, when he tested River Plate goalkeeper Franco Armani from afar in the fifth minute. Four minutes later, Leonardo Ponzio received the first yellow card after fouling Boca Juniors' Edwin Cardona. Nearing the 16th minute of play, a stray cross fell to River Plate midfielder Ignacio Fernández, who initiated a one-two passing play with Gonzalo Martínez. As the former entered the area, he was brought down by Cardona, which prompted referee Patricio Loustau to award the penalty. Martínez then converted from the spot, slotting the ball past goalkeeper Agustín Rossi to make it 1–0 in the 18th minute.

Once in the lead, River Plate proceeded to take further control, as they ruled out forwards Cardona and Cristian Pavón from the game through tight marking. Carlos Tévez's involvement in the offense was also nullified, as he had to leave the area to get ahold of the ball, thus not fulfilling his striker role. At the 26-minute mark, Boca Juniors left-back Frank Fabra was booked after a tough challenge on Rodrigo Mora. Although Boca Juniors controlled possession, they were unable to stand up to the opposing defensive block, which relied on a solid defensive effort and consistent pressure to remain untroubled. River Plate even came close to extending their lead in the 39th minute, when Martínez took a left-footed shot from outside the box, to which Rossi reacted late, albeit managing to tip it away. Three minutes later, Nahitan Nández was shown a yellow card for a late tackle on Fernández.

==== Second half ====
Boca Juniors went all out in search of an equalizer from the start of the second half. They came close to achieving it just two minutes in, when Armani stretched out to tip the ball out for a corner after Pablo Pérez found Pavón through a cross. Ninety seconds later, a free kick sent by Cardona from the right landed on the edge of the six-yard box, where Lucas Pratto unintentionally swung the ball for the net. Armani appeared once again, raising his left palm and preventing the own goal. Fernández was booked in between deliveries, product of a foul on Wilmar Barrios. River Plate manager Marcelo Gallardo made the first substitution in the 54th minute, when he switched right-back Gonzalo Montiel, who was suffering from a muscle strain, for Camilo Mayada. Shortly after, Boca Juniors had two efforts to equalise through Pavón and Cardona, but both went wide. At the 64-minute mark, the second change of the match was Enzo Pérez, replaced by Bruno Zuculini. Three minutes later, River Plate ran out of substitutions when Pratto was subbed off for fellow striker Ignacio Scocco.

In the 69th minute, Cardona found Fabra on the left side, after filtering a pass that ran through the defense. The left-back, one-on-one with Armani, unleashed a low left-footed shot to the far post, which the goalkeeper saved. Immediately after, Nández attempted a follow up shot to the near post, but to no avail, as it was also deflected by Armani. Boca Juniors took the subsequent corner, which was cleared away by Scocco. The clearance fell to Fernández, who ran down the pitch as he led a counter-attack. He eventually laid the ball off to Martínez, who performed an inside cut that left his marker behind and sent a precise cross for Scocco to finish in front of the net. Now two goals down, Guillermo Barros Schelotto replied by subbing forward Ramón Ábila in for right-back Leonardo Jara. The remainder of the match was Boca Juniors' in terms of possession, although they lacked initiative and cohesive play. In the final ten minutes, Pablo Pérez and Tévez were also booked for their side. Nearing stoppage time, a chance to pull one back arose for them, following a delivery sent by Pavón into the box. Tévez connected the cross, but his header went wide of the goal. Loustau eventually blew for full-time with the score of 2–0 to River Plate, who consequently won their first Supercopa Argentina title.

=== Details ===
14 March 2018
21:10 UTC−3

Boca Juniors	0–2	River Plate
	Report	G. Martínez 18' (pen.); Scocco 70'

Estadio Malvinas Argentinas, Mendoza
Attendance: 40,000
Referee: Patricio Loustau

Boca Juniors	River Plate

GK	1	(Argentina) Agustín Rossi
RB	29	(Argentina) Leonardo Jara		(substituted off) 72'
CB	2	(Argentina) Paolo Goltz
CB	6	(Argentina) Lisandro Magallán
LB	18	(Colombia) Frank Fabra	(yellow card) 26'
CM	15	(Uruguay) Nahitan Nández	(yellow card) 42'
CM	16	(Colombia) Wílmar Barrios	(yellow card) 39'
CM	8	(Argentina) Pablo Pérez (c)	(yellow card) 80'
RW	7	(Argentina) Cristian Pavón
CF	32	(Argentina) Carlos Tevez	(yellow card) 88'
LW	10	(Colombia) Edwin Cardona
Substitutes:
GK	1	(Argentina) Guillermo Sara
DF	3	(Argentina) Emmanuel Mas
DF	24	(Argentina) Julio Buffarini
DF	27	(Argentina) Santiago Vergini
MF	30	(Argentina) Emanuel Reynoso
FW	17	(Argentina) Ramón Ábila		(substituted on) 72'
FW	22	(Argentina) Óscar Benítez
Manager:
(Argentina) Guillermo Barros Schelotto

GK	1	(Argentina) Franco Armani
RB	29	(Argentina) Gonzalo Montiel		(substituted off) 54'
CB	2	(Argentina) Jonatan Maidana
CB	22	(Argentina) Javier Pinola	(yellow card) 39'
LB	3	(Uruguay) Marcelo Saracchi
CM	24	(Argentina) Enzo Pérez		(substituted off) 65'
CM	23	(Argentina) Leonardo Ponzio (c)	(yellow card) 9'
CM	26	(Argentina) Ignacio Fernández	(yellow card) 48'
AM	10	(Argentina) Gonzalo Martínez
CF	7	(Uruguay) Rodrigo Mora
CF	27	(Argentina) Lucas Pratto		(substituted off) 67'
Substitutes:
GK	25	(Argentina) Enrique Bologna
DF	28	(Argentina) Lucas Martínez Quarta
MF	5	(Argentina) Bruno Zuculini		(substituted on) 65'
MF	8	(Colombia) Juan Fernando Quintero
MF	18	(Uruguay) Camilo Mayada		(substituted on) 54'
FW	19	(Colombia) Rafael Santos Borré
FW	32	(Argentina) Ignacio Scocco		(substituted on) 67'
Manager:
(Argentina) Marcelo Gallardo

Man of the Match
Franco Armani (River Plate)

Assistant referees
Yamil Bonfá
Gustavo Rossi
Fourth official
Fernando Rapallini

Match rules

- 90 minutes
- No extra-time
- Penalty shoot-out if necessary
- Seven named substitutes, of which up to three may be used

=== Statistics ===
Overall
Statistic	Boca Juniors	River Plate
Goals scored	0	2
Total shots	11	7
Shots on target	5	4
Ball possession	59%	41%
Corner kicks	5	2
Fouls committed	17	19
Offsides	2	1
Yellow cards	5	3
Red cards	0	0

== Post-match ==
Marcelo Gallardo's stay as manager of River Plate was in question before the game, due to the poor results leading up to the match, as well as some of the transfers he had requested. He addressed this discussion after the win, boasting with irony: "We knew how Boca Juniors played, but they didn't know how we would [...] It was part of the strategy to play badly these past two months in order to win the most important match we had this semester."

Boca Juniors' Guillermo Barros Schelotto was disappointed with the result. He expressed his thoughts in a later held press conference, stating: "They didn't dominate us, they didn't control the ball and didn't have any scoring opportunities." He explained further: “The defeat was unfair. They hardly ever threatened us. One goal came from a penalty and the other from a counter-attack. We're left frustrated about the result.”

The outcome of the Supercopa impacted both teams differently, causing a turning point especially for River Plate, who won seven and drew one of their last eight league fixtures. They also went on to have an almost eight-month unbeaten streak, totalizing 32 consecutive games without a loss. In turn, Boca Juniors only achieved 12 of their remaining 24 points in play. Finishing just two ahead of runners-up Godoy Cruz, they won the 2017-18 Superliga Argentina, thus qualifying for the 2019 Copa Libertadores. River Plate would finish eighth in the Argentine league; however, they also entered the following season's continental tournament by defeating Boca Juniors in the final of the 2018 edition, winning 5–3 on aggregate.

== See also ==
- 2017–18 Superliga Argentina
- 2017–18 Copa Argentina
- 2017–18 Club Atlético Boca Juniors season
- 2017–18 Club Atlético River Plate season
