= Esteban Andrada =

Argentine footballer (born 1991)

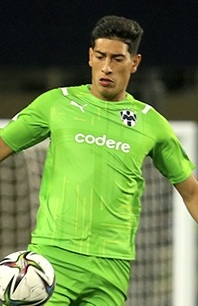
- Andrada with Monterrey at the 2021 FIFA Club World Cup

Personal information
- Full name: Esteban Maximiliano Andrada
- Date of birth: 26 January 1991 (age 35)
- Place of birth: San Martín, Mendoza, Argentina
- Height: 1.84 m (6 ft 0 in)
- Position: Goalkeeper

Team information
- Current team: Monterrey
- Number: 1

Youth career
- 2005–2008: San Martín (M)
- 2008–2012: Lanús

Senior career*
Years	Team	Apps	(Gls)
2012–2018	Lanús	37	(0)
2014–2015	→ Arsenal de Sarandí (loan)	45	(0)
2018–2021	Boca Juniors	53	(0)
2021–	Monterrey	135	(0)
2025–2026	→ Zaragoza (loan)	27	(0)

International career^{‡}
2011	Argentina U20	14	(0)
2011	Argentina U23	5	(0)
2019–2022	Argentina	4	(0)
- * Club domestic league appearances and goals as of 17:25, 27 April 2026 (UTC) ‡ National team caps and goals as of 10 October 2026

Esteban Maximiliano Andrada (Spanish pronunciation: [esˈteβan anˈdɾaða]; born 26 January 1991) is an Argentine professional footballer who plays as a goalkeeper for Liga MX club Monterrey.

== Club career ==
=== Lanús ===
Andrada came through the youth academy of Lanús and established himself in the first team during the mid-2010s. He was a squad member for the club's Copa Sudamericana triumph in 2013, serving as backup to first-choice goalkeeper Agustín Marchesín and not appearing in the competition. In 2014 he was loaned to Arsenal de Sarandí before returning to Lanús, where he became the undisputed first-choice goalkeeper. He won the Argentine Primera División title in 2016 and was runner-up in the Copa Libertadores the following year, when Lanús were defeated in the final by River Plate.

=== Boca Juniors ===
On 6 August 2018, Andrada joined Boca Juniors from Lanús. He was the first-choice goalkeeper in the 2018 Copa Libertadores finals, in which Boca Juniors lost to city rivals River Plate at the Estadio Santiago Bernabéu in Madrid—the first Copa Libertadores final held outside South America. Under manager Gustavo Alfaro, he established himself as one of the most reliable goalkeepers in Argentine football. In September 2019, he set a new club record by going 864 consecutive minutes without conceding a goal in domestic league competition, surpassing a mark held by Carlos Navarro Montoya since 1992. He won the Argentine Primera División with Boca Juniors in the 2019–20 season.

=== Monterrey ===
On 4 July 2021, Andrada joined Mexican club Monterrey. During four seasons with the club, making over 130 Liga MX appearances.

==== Real Zaragoza (loan) ====
On 1 September 2025, Andrada joined Real Zaragoza on loan from Monterrey until the end of the 2025–26 season. In a Segunda División match against SD Huesca on 26 April 2026, with Zaragoza trailing 1–0 in stoppage time, Andrada received a second yellow card and was sent off. He then approached Huesca captain Jorge Pulido and struck him in the face, triggering a confrontation involving players from both sides. Huesca goalkeeper Dani Jiménez was also shown a red card following the brawl. Andrada subsequently issued a public apology, stating he was "very, very sorry" and that it was "not a good image for the club, for the fans, and especially not for a professional", while Zaragoza announced it would take internal disciplinary measures. On 29 April, he was handed a 13-match ban for the punching incident.

== International career ==
Andrada represented the Argentina U20s at the 2009 Toulon Tournament, 2011 South American Youth Championship, and the 2011 FIFA U-20 World Cup. He also represented the Argentina U22 squad at the 2011 Pan Am tournament.

Andrada made his debut for the Argentina national football team on 26 March 2019 in a friendly against Morocco, as a starter. He was one of the three goalkeepers called up by manager Lionel Scaloni for the 2019 Copa América, but withdrew from the squad on 14 June due to a knee injury. He was replaced by Juan Musso.

== Career statistics ==
As of match played on 26 April 2026

Appearances and goals by club, season and competition
Club	Season	League			National cup (Note: Includes Copa Argentina, Copa del Rey)		Continental		Other		Total	
Club	Season	Division	Apps	Goals	Apps	Goals	Apps	Goals	Apps	Goals	Apps	Goals
Lanús	2010–11	Argentine Primera División	0	0	—		—		—		0	0
Lanús	2011–12	Argentine Primera División	0	0	1	0	0	0	—		1	0
Lanús	2012–13	Argentine Primera División	1	0	0	0	0	0	—		1	0
Lanús	2013–14	Argentine Primera División	2	0	1	0	2 (Note: Appearances in Copa Libertadores)	0	—		5	0
Lanús	2016–17	Argentine Primera División	16	0	1	0	7	0	1 (Note: Appearance in Supercopa Argentina)	0	25	0
Lanús	2017–18	Argentine Primera División	18	0	1	0	11	0	—		30	0
Lanús	Total		37	0	4	0	20	0	1	0	62	0
Arsenal de Sarandí (loan)	2014	Argentine Primera División	18	0	1	0	—		—		19	0
Arsenal de Sarandí (loan)	2015	Argentine Primera División	27	0	1	0	1 (Note: Appearances in Copa Sudamericana)	0	—		29	0
Arsenal de Sarandí (loan)	Total		45	0	2	0	1	0	—		48	0
Boca Juniors	2018–19	Argentine Primera División	18	0	1	0	12	0	8 (Note: Seven appearances in Copa de la Superliga, one appearance in Supercopa Argentina)	0	39	0
Boca Juniors	2019–20	Argentine Primera División	20	0	0	0	6	0	1 (Note: Appearance(s) in Copa de la Superliga)	0	27	0
Boca Juniors	2020–21	Argentine Primera División	6	0	—		10	0	—		16	0
Boca Juniors	2021	Argentine Primera División	9	0	—		2	0	—		11	0
Boca Juniors	Total		53	0	1	0	30	0	9	0	93	0
Monterrey	2021–22	Liga MX	35	0	—		—		2 (Note: Appearances in FIFA Club World Cup)	0	37	0
Monterrey	2022–23	Liga MX	34	0	—		—		6 (Note: Appearances in Leagues Cup)	0	40	0
Monterrey	2023–24	Liga MX	38	0	—		8 (Note: Appearances in CONCACAF Champions Cup)	0	2	0	48	0
Monterrey	2024–25	Liga MX	28	0	—		2	0	4	0	34	0
Monterrey	Total		135	0	—		10	0	14	0	159	0
Zaragoza (loan)	2025–26	Segunda División	27	0	1	0	—		—		28	0
Career total			297	0	8	0	61	0	24	0	390	0

== Honours ==
Lanús

- Argentine Primera División: 2016
- Copa Bicentenario: 2016
- Supercopa Argentina: 2016
- Copa Sudamericana: 2013
- Copa Libertadores runner-up: 2017

Boca Juniors

- Primera División: 2019–20
- Supercopa Argentina: 2018
- Copa de la Liga Profesional: 2020
- Copa Libertadores runner-up: 2018

Monterrey

- CONCACAF Champions League: 2021

Argentina

- Superclásico de las Américas: 2019
