= Marcelo Herrera =

Marcelo Herrera may refer to:

- Marcelo Herrera (footballer, born 1966), Argentine midfielder for Club Atlético Vélez Sarsfield
- Marcelo Herrera (footballer, born 1992), Argentine defender for Club Atlético Lanús
- Marcelo Herrera (footballer, born 1998), Argentine defender for San Lorenzo de Almagro
