= Iván Marcone =

Argentine footballer

Personal information
- Full name: Iván José Marcone
- Date of birth: 3 June 1990 (age 36)
- Place of birth: Sarandí, Argentina
- Height: 1.83 m (6 ft 0 in)
- Position: Central midfielder

Team information
- Current team: Independiente
- Number: 23

Youth career
- Arsenal Sarandí

Senior career*
Years	Team	Apps	(Gls)
2008–2015	Arsenal Sarandí	205	(1)
2016–2018	Lanús	58	(0)
2018	Cruz Azul	18	(0)
2019–2021	Boca Juniors	25	(0)
2020	→ Elche (loan)	34	(0)
2021–2022	Elche	20	(0)
2022–	Independiente	130	(2)

International career
2019	Argentina	1	(0)
- * Club domestic league appearances and goals as of 17:47, 6 June 2026 (UTC)

Iván José Marcone (born 3 June 1990) is an Argentine professional footballer who plays as a central midfielder for Independiente.

== Club career ==
=== Arsenal de Sarandí ===
Born in Sarandí, Marcone was an Arsenal de Sarandí youth graduate. He made his professional debut on 18 October 2008, coming on as a second half substitute in a 3–3 home draw against Vélez Sársfield for the Primera División championship.

Marcone scored his first goal on 17 October 2009, netting the first in a 1–1 home draw against Banfield. He was an important midfield unit in the club's 2012 Clausura winning campaign, being an ever-present figure.

Marcone was later linked to La Liga outfit Celta de Vigo and Major League Soccer's Chicago Fire, but both offers were rejected by Arsenal. In 2013, he was also strongly linked to Independiente, but nothing came of it.

On 9 January 2015, Marcone joined Getafe CF on loan until June, with a buyout clause. However, the deal was declared void later in the month.

=== Lanus ===
Marcone played as a holding midfielder as Lanus reached the final of the Copa Libertadores in 2017. He was linked to a move to La Liga side UD Las Palmas afterwards as well as Club Tijuana in Mexico and Atletico Nacional in Colombia.

=== Cruz Azul ===
In the summer of 2018, Marcone joined Mexican club Cruz Azul. On 21 July, Marcone debuted with Cruz Azul against Puebla and played the full 90 minutes in Cruz Azul's first match of the Apertura 2018. He won the Copa MX facing C.F. Monterrey in the final. Cruz Azul ended in 1st place in the regular season with Marcone being a very important player to the team. He took Cruz Azul to their first Liga MX final since 2013, where they had lost against Club America in one of the most dramatic finals of all time. They faced Club America again in the final of the Apertura 2018 and tied 0–0 away and lost 2–0 home, both in the Estadio Azteca. In the final, he lost the ball outside the box and ended up costing Cruz Azul the game.

=== Boca Juniors ===
After six months in Mexico with Cruz Azul, he signed for Boca Juniors in January 2019, in hopes of getting called up to the Argentina National Football Team for the Conmebol Copa America 2019 tournament.

==== 2020–21: Loan to Elche ====
On 5 October 2020, he was loaned to La Liga side Elche CF, with an obligatory buyout clause.

=== Elche ===
After playing 5 matches, the obligatory buyout clause was activated and Marcone became a permanent Elche player.

=== Independiente ===
On 18 June 2022, Marcone joined Argentine Primera División club Independiente, signing an 18 months contract.

== International career ==
Marcone was called up in the Argentina national football team in March 2017. On 26 March 2019, Marcone debuted internationally with the team defeating Morocco, 1–0.

== Personal life ==
Born in Argentina, Marcone is of Italian descent, and is a lifelong fan of Argentinian club Independiente

== Career statistics ==
=== Club ===
As of match played 15 April 2024

Appearances and goals by club, season and competition
Club	Season	League			National Cup		League Cup		Continental		Other		Total	
Club	Season	Division	Apps	Goals	Apps	Goals	Apps	Goals	Apps	Goals	Apps	Goals	Apps	Goals
Arsenal Sarandí	2008–09	Argentine Primera División	12	0	—		—		—		—		12	0
Arsenal Sarandí	2009–10	Argentine Primera División	25	1	—		—		—		—		25	1
Arsenal Sarandí	2010–11	Argentine Primera División	23	0	—		—		6 (Note: Appearance(s) in Copa Sudamericana)	0	—		29	0
Arsenal Sarandí	2011–12	Argentine Primera División	36	0	—		—		6 (Note: Appearance(s) in Copa Libertadores)	0	1 (Note: Appearance(s) in Supercopa Argentina)	0	43	0
Arsenal Sarandí	2012–13	Argentine Primera División	34	0	6	0	—		6	0	1	0	47	0
Arsenal Sarandí	2013–14	Argentine Primera División	35	0	1	0	—		8	1	—		44	1
Arsenal Sarandí	2014–15	Argentine Primera División	14	0	1	0	—		—		—		15	0
Arsenal Sarandí	2015	Argentine Primera División	26	0	—		—		—		—		26	0
Arsenal Sarandí	Total		205	1	8	0	0	0	26	1	2	0	241	2
Lanús	2016	Argentine Primera División	13	0	3	0	—		2	0	1	0	19	0
Lanús	2016–17	Argentine Primera División	23	0	2	0	—		14	0	—		39	0
Lanús	2017–18	Argentine Primera División	22	0	—		—		2	0	—		24	0
Lanús	Total		58	0	5	0	0	0	18	0	1	0	82	0
Cruz Azul	2018–19	Liga MX	18	0	6	0	—		—		6 (Note: Appearance(s) in Liga MX Playoffs)	0	30	0
Boca Juniors	2018–19	Argentine Primera División	11	0	—		—		—		1	0	12	0
Boca Juniors	2019–20	Argentine Primera División	14	0	1	0	4	0	12	0	—		31	0
Boca Juniors	2020	Argentine Primera División	0	0	0	0	1	0	2	0	—		3	0
Boca Juniors	Total		25	0	1	0	5	0	14	0	1	0	46	0
Elche (loan)	2020–21	La Liga	34	0	1	0	—		—		—		34	0
Elche	2021–22	La Liga	20	0	2	0	—		—		—		22	0
Independiente	2022	Argentine Primera División	17	1	3	0	—		—		—		20	1
Independiente	2023	Argentine Primera División	22	0	1	0	14	0	—		—		37	0
Independiente	2024	Argentine Primera División	0	0	0	0	12	0	—		—		12	0
Independiente	Total		39	1	4	0	26	0	0	0	0	0	69	1
Career total			399	2	27	0	31	0	58	1	10	0	524	3

== Honours ==
Arsenal

- Primera División: 2012 Clausura
- Copa Argentina: 2012–13
- Supercopa Argentina: 2012

Lanús

- Primera División: 2016
- Copa del Bicentenario: 2016
- Supercopa Argentina: 2016

Cruz Azul

- Copa MX: Apertura 2018

Boca Juniors

- Primera División: 2019–20
- Supercopa Argentina: 2018
