= Jorge Almirón =

Argentine footballer (born 1971)

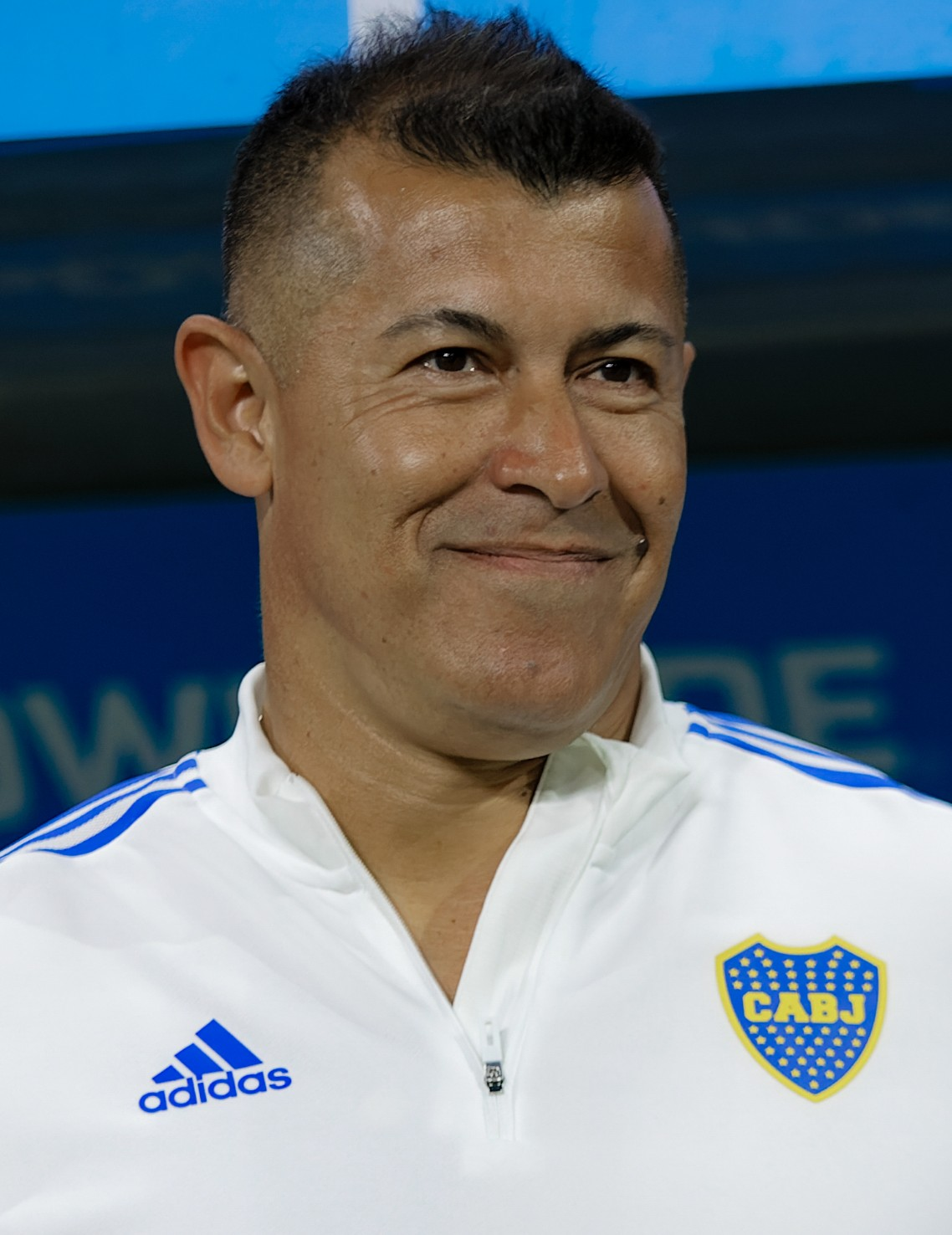
- Almirón with Boca Juniors in 2023

Personal information
- Full name: Jorge Francisco Almirón Quintana
- Date of birth: June 19, 1971 (age 55)
- Place of birth: San Miguel, Buenos Aires, Argentina
- Position: Defensive midfielder

Team information
- Current team: Rosario Central (head coach)

Senior career*
Years	Team	Apps	(Gls)
1991–1994	San Miguel	–	(–)
1994–1995	Santiago Wanderers	56	(26)
1996	San Miguel	–	(–)
1996–1997	Deportivo Español	31	(2)
1997–2000	Atlas	86	(10)
2000–2004	Morelia	168	(12)
2004–2006	Querétaro	74	(6)
2006–2007	Atlante	34	(1)
2007–2008	León	45	(2)
2008–2009	Dorados de Sinaloa	8	(0)
Total		502	(59)

Managerial career
- 2008–2009: Dorados de Sinaloa
- 2009–2010: Defensa y Justicia
- 2010: Veracruz
- 2010–2011: Correcaminos UAT
- 2011–2012: Atlas (assistant coach)
- 2012–2013: Defensa y Justicia
- 2013: Tijuana
- 2013–2014: Godoy Cruz
- 2014–2015: Independiente
- 2015–2017: Lanús
- 2017–2018: Atlético Nacional
- 2018–2019: San Lorenzo
- 2019: Al-Shabab
- 2020–2021: Elche
- 2022: Lanús
- 2022: Elche
- 2023: Boca Juniors
- 2024–2025: Colo-Colo
- 2026–: Rosario Central
- * Club domestic league appearances and goals

Jorge Francisco Almirón Quintana (born June 19, 1971), commonly known as Jorge Almirón, is an Argentine football manager and former player who played as a defensive midfielder. He is the manager of Rosario Central.

== Career ==
On July 26, 1997, Almirón made his Liga MX debut with Atlas in a 2–1 victory over Puebla.

In the season of the Clausura 2006, he helped Querétaro pass to the Primera División of Mexico but was relegated back to the Segunda División (now called Liga de Ascenso) in Clausura 2007. In 2008, he was named player-coach of Dorados.

As manager, Almirón guided Lanús to achieve its second league title ever and reached the 2017 Copa Libertadores finals, where they were defeated by Brazilian club Grêmio.

In November 2018, he was introduced as the new manager of San Lorenzo.

In June 2019, Almirón became the new manager of the Al-Shabab, after the Saudi club sacked the Romanian manager Marius Șumudică.

On 26 August 2020, Almirón was appointed manager of recently promoted La Liga club Elche.

== Managerial statistics ==
As of match played 24 October 2026

Managerial record by team and tenure
Team	Nat	From	To	Record							
Team	Nat	From	To	G	W	D	L	GF	GA	GD	Win %
Dorados de Sinaloa	(Mexico)	16 October 2008	30 June 2009	23	8	9	6	32	23	+9	34.78
Defensa y Justicia	(Argentina)	6 July 2009	17 February 2010	22	8	6	8	31	32	−1	36.36
Veracruz	(Mexico)	17 February 2010	29 March 2010	7	2	2	3	9	10	−1	28.57
Correcaminos UAT	(Mexico)	17 September 2010	23 August 2011	31	9	9	13	41	42	−1	29.03
Defensa y Justicia	(Argentina)	23 October 2012	30 June 2013	29	13	10	6	35	29	+6	44.83
Tijuana	(Mexico)	30 June 2013	11 November 2013	21	8	7	6	30	25	+5	38.10
Godoy Cruz	(Argentina)	9 December 2013	18 July 2014	19	9	5	5	23	18	+5	47.37
Independiente	(Argentina)	18 July 2014	25 May 2015	35	14	11	10	51	46	+5	40.00
Lanús	(Argentina)	11 December 2015	19 December 2017	81	42	15	24	115	77	+38	51.85
Atlético Nacional	(Colombia)	19 December 2017	30 August 2018	43	23	11	9	49	25	+24	53.49
San Lorenzo	(Argentina)	5 November 2018	13 May 2019	25	4	14	7	14	19	−5	16.00
Al-Shabab	(Saudi Arabia)	24 June 2019	5 December 2019	16	8	4	4	24	13	+11	50.00
Elche	(Spain)	26 August 2020	12 February 2021	24	5	9	10	22	34	−12	20.83
Lanús	(Argentina)	25 December 2021	7 July 2022	29	8	11	10	34	32	+2	27.59
Elche	(Spain)	12 October 2022	7 November 2022	5	0	2	3	5	10	−5	0.00
Boca Juniors	(Argentina)	10 April 2023	5 November 2023	43	17	13	13	51	39	+12	39.53
Colo-Colo	(Chile)	4 January 2024	19 August 2025	84	40	23	21	120	86	+34	47.62
Rosario Central	(Argentina)	15 December 2025	3 June 2026	44	24	10	10	61	36	+25	54.55
Total				580	241	171	168	747	596	+151	41.55

== Honours ==
=== Player ===
Santiago Wanderers

- Primera B de Chile: 1995

Morelia

- Mexican Primera División: Invierno 2000

Querétaro

- Ascenso MX: Clausura 2006

=== Manager ===
Lanús

- Argentine Primera División: 2016
- Copa del Bicentenario: 2016
- Supercopa Argentina: 2016

Colo-Colo

- Chilean Primera División: 2024
- Supercopa de Chile: 2024

Rosario Central

- Supercopa Internacional: 2026
