= José Sand =

Argentine footballer (born 1980)

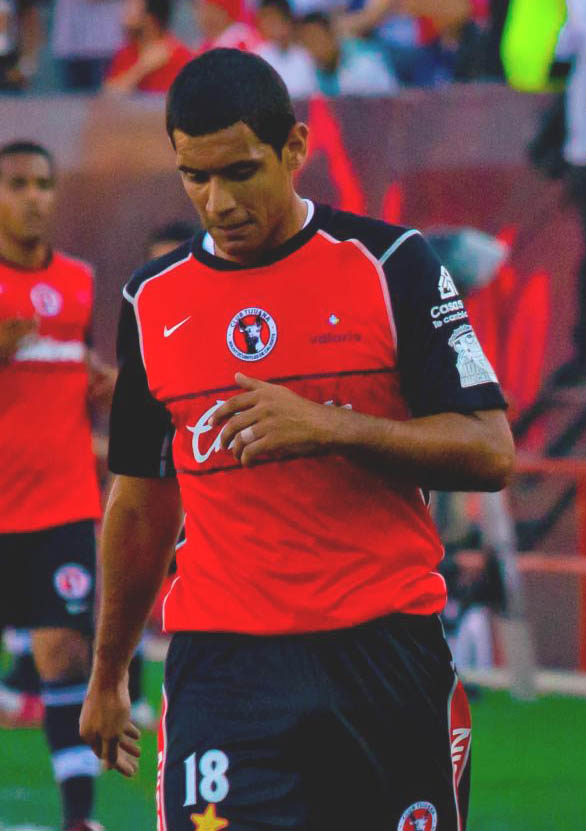
- Sand in 2011

Personal information
- Full name: José Gustavo Sand
- Date of birth: 17 July 1980 (age 46)
- Place of birth: Bella Vista, Argentina
- Height: 1.82 m (6 ft 0 in)
- Position: Striker

Youth career
- 1998–1999: River Plate

Senior career*
| Years | Team | Apps | (Gls) |
| 1999–2000 | Colón | 5 | (1) |
| 2000–2001 | Independiente Rivadavia | 17 | (0) |
| 2001–2002 | Vitória | 13 | (4) |
| 2002–2003 | Defensores de Belgrano | 47 | (20) |
| 2004–2005 | River Plate | 42 | (8) |
| 2005–2006 | Banfield | 33 | (10) |
| 2006–2007 | Colón | 24 | (7) |
| 2007–2009 | Lanús | 67 | (51) |
| 2009–2011 | Al Ain | 30 | (31) |
| 2011 | → Deportivo La Coruña (loan) | 5 | (0) |
| 2011–2012 | Tijuana | 34 | (12) |
| 2012–2013 | Racing Club | 21 | (2) |
| 2013–2014 | Tigre | 14 | (1) |
| 2014 | Argentinos Juniors | 7 | (0) |
| 2014 | Boca Unidos | 16 | (4) |
| 2015 | Aldosivi | 31 | (12) |
| 2016–2018 | Lanús | 52 | (35) |
| 2018 | Deportivo Cali | 31 | (11) |
| 2019–2023 | Lanús | 84 | (42) |
| Total | | 573 | (256) |

International career
| 2008–2009 | Argentina | 2 | (0) |
- * Club domestic league appearances and goals as of 19:02, 12 April 2022 (UTC)

José Gustavo Sand (born 17 July 1980), nicknamed Pepe, is an Argentine former professional footballer who played as a striker. He made two appearances for the Argentina national team.

== Club career ==
=== Early career ===
Born in Bella Vista, Corrientes, Sand started his professional career with River Plate in 1998. He then had his first spell with Colón between 1999 and 2000. In 2000, he dropped down a division to play for Independiente Rivadavia of the Argentine 2nd Division. In 2000, he joined Brazilian side Vitória. In 2002 Sand returned to Argentina to play for Defensores de Belgrano. He had a second spell with River Plate between 2004 and 2005. Between 2005 and 2006 he played for Banfield, and then returned to Colón in 2006 before joining Lanús in 2007.

=== Lanús ===
Sand started his Lanús career by being sent off on his league debut in a 5–3 defeat to Independiente. He then scored ten goals in his next nine league games. His good scoring record of 15 goals in 15 games in his first tournament with Lanús established himself as a favourite amongst the fans. In 2007, he was part of the squad that won the Apertura 2007 tournament, Lanús' first ever top flight league title. Sand became top scorer in the Primera División Argentina for the first time in the Apertura 2008 championship with 15 goals in 19 games. In Clausura 2009 he became the first player to become top scorer in consecutive tournaments since Diego Maradona in 1980. Overall, he scored 50 goals in 67 league matches and 6 in 12 Copa Libertadores matches.

=== Al Ain ===
On 7 August 2009, Sand was sold to the Al Ain S.C.C. of Abu Dhabi at $10 million, and presented in Valencia, Spain before media from all over Spain, Argentina and the UAE. He was given the number 9, previously worn by teammate Faisal Ali. In his first match with Al Ain, he scored his first goal on 9 August in a 2–1 loss against Villarreal B. Sand started this season in great form, and score 33 goals in all competitions and scored three hat-tricks in the league against Al Ahli, Al Shabab & Emirates. Sand was awarded the 2009–10 Al Hadath Golden Boot, after scoring 24 goals in 20 league matches, averaging 1.2 goals per match.

=== Deportivo La Coruña ===
On 31 January 2011, Deportivo La Coruña announced on their official website that they had acquired the services of Sand for €500,000 on loan for six-months. Deportivo also had a buyout option from Al Ain for €3 million, which could be fulfilled during the summer of that same year.

=== Club Tijuana ===
On 30 June 2011, Sand was sold to the Club Tijuana of Mexico for $4 million.

=== Racing Club ===
On 8 July 2012, Sand signed a contract with Racing Club in the Argentine Primera División.

=== Lanús ===
After a successful spell at Aldosivi, Sand returned to Lanús in December 2015 with the club declaring that he had 'returned home'.

=== Deportivo Cali ===
In January 2018, Sand joined Deportivo Cali to help spearhead the Colombian team's attack in their Copa Sudamericana campaign.

=== Lanús ===
After one year in Deportivo Cali, Sand signed for Lanús for the third time. The deal was announced on 15 December 2018.

On 6 January 2021, Sand scored the only goal of the match against Vélez in the first leg of the 2020 Copa Sudamericana semifinals, becoming, at the age of 40, the oldest goalscorer in a semifinal or final in the competition's history.

On 14 April 2022, Sand scored in a 3–1 win over Barcelona de Guayaquil in the 2022 Copa Sudamericana group stage, becoming, at the age of 41 years and 8 months, the second-oldest player to ever score in the Copa Sudamericana, only behind Richard Pellejero, who scored a brace in the 2019 Copa Sudamericana, aged 43 years and 31 days.

== International career ==
In light of his excellent club form, Sand received his first-ever international call up from Alfio Basile to replace the suspended Carlos Tevez in the national squad for the FIFA World Cup qualifier with Chile in Santiago on 15 October 2008. He made his second appearance for Argentina in a friendly match against Panama on 20 May 2009.

== Personal life ==
Sand's brother, Darío Sand, is also a professional footballer who has played for Club Agropecuario Argentino and San Martín de Tucumán. Sand's aunt, Nancy Sand, is a politician who served as mayor of his hometown of Bella Vista and as a member of the National Congress.

== Career statistics ==
=== Club ===
As of 1 January 2022

Appearances and goals by club, season and competition
| Club | Season | League | | National cup | | League cup | | Continental | | Other | | Total | |
| Club | Season | Apps | Goals | Apps | Goals | Apps | Goals | Apps | Goals | Apps | Goals | Apps | Goals |
|---|---|---|---|---|---|---|---|---|---|---|---|---|---|
| Colón | 1999–2000 | 5 | 1 | | | – | | | | | | 5 | 1 |
| Independiente Rivadavia | 2000–01 | 17 | 0 | | | – | | | | | | 17 | 0 |
| Vitória | 2001–02 | 13 | 4 | | | – | | | | 5 | 0 | 18 | 4 |
| Defensores de Belgrano | 2002–03 | 47 | 20 | | | – | | | | | | 47 | 20 |
| River Plate | 2003–04 | 16 | 7 | | | – | | 2 | 0 | | | 18 | 7 |
| River Plate | 2004–05 | 26 | 1 | | | – | | 13 | 3 | | | 39 | 4 |
| River Plate | Total | 42 | 8 | 0 | 0 | – | | 15 | 3 | 0 | 0 | 57 | 11 |
| Banfield | 2005–06 | 33 | 10 | | | – | | 4 | 0 | | | 37 | 10 |
| Colón | 2006–07 | 24 | 7 | | | – | | | | | | 24 | 7 |
| Lanús | 2007–08 | 30 | 22 | | | – | | 12 | 6 | | | 42 | 28 |
| Lanús | 2008–09 | 37 | 29 | | | – | | 4 | 2 | | | 41 | 31 |
| Lanús | Total | 67 | 51 | 0 | 0 | 0 | 0 | 16 | 8 | 0 | 0 | 83 | 59 |
| Al Ain | 2009–10 | 20 | 24 | 8 | 5 | – | | 5 | 4 | | | 33 | 33 |
| Al Ain | 2010–11 | 10 | 7 | 6 | 4 | – | | | | | | 16 | 11 |
| Al Ain | Total | 30 | 31 | 14 | 9 | 0 | 0 | 5 | 4 | 0 | 0 | 49 | 44 |
| Deportivo La Coruña (loan) | 2010–11 | 5 | 0 | 0 | 0 | – | | – | | – | | 5 | 0 |
| Tijuana | 2011–12 | 32 | 12 | | | – | | | | 2 | 0 | 34 | 12 |
| Racing | 2011–12 | 0 | 0 | 1 | 0 | – | | 0 | 0 | | | 1 | 0 |
| Racing | 2012–13 | 21 | 2 | 1 | 0 | – | | 1 | 0 | | | 23 | 2 |
| Racing | Total | 21 | 2 | 2 | 0 | 0 | 0 | 1 | 0 | 0 | 0 | 24 | 2 |
| Tigre | 2013–14 | 14 | 1 | 0 | 0 | – | | | | | | 14 | 1 |
| Argentinos Juniors | 2013–14 | 7 | 0 | 0 | 0 | – | | | | | | 7 | 0 |
| Boca Unidos | 2014 | 16 | 4 | 0 | 0 | – | | | | | | 16 | 4 |
| Aldosivi | 2015 | 28 | 9 | 1 | 0 | – | | | | 3 (Note: Appearances in Sudamericana play-offs) | 3 | 32 | 12 |
| Lanús | 2016 | 16 | 14 | 0 | 0 | – | | | | 1 (Note: Appearance in Primera División final) | 1 | 17 | 15 |
| Lanús | 2016–17 | 29 | 15 | 4 | 4 | – | | 8 | 4 | 1 (Note: Appearance in Supercopa Argentina) | 1 | 42 | 24 |
| Lanús | 2017–18 | 6 | 5 | 1 | 0 | – | | 8 | 5 | | | 15 | 10 |
| Lanús | Total | 51 | 34 | 5 | 4 | 0 | 0 | 16 | 9 | 2 | 2 | 74 | 49 |
| Deportivo Cali | 2018 | 29 | 11 | 0 | 0 | – | | 8 | 3 | 2 (Note: Appearances in Apertura play-offs) | 0 | 39 | 14 |
| Lanús | 2018–19 | 10 | 7 | 1 | 1 | 4 | 0 | | | | | 15 | 8 |
| Lanús | 2019–20 | 23 | 10 | 4 | 2 | 1 | 0 | | | | | 28 | 12 |
| Lanús | 2020 | 5 | 3 | 0 | 0 | 1 | 0 | 6 | 3 | | | 12 | 6 |
| Lanús | 2021 | 24 | 15 | 2 | 1 | 13 | 6 | 8 | 3 | | | 47 | 25 |
| Lanús | Total | 62 | 38 | 7 | 4 | 19 | 6 | 14 | 3 | 0 | 0 | 102 | 51 |
| Career total | | 543 | 243 | 29 | 17 | 19 | 6 | 79 | 30 | 14 | 5 | 684 | 301 |

== Honours ==
Lanús

- Primera División: 2007 Apertura, 2016
- Copa del Bicentenario: 2016
- Supercopa Argentina: 2016
- Copa Libertadores runner-up: 2017

Al Ain

- UAE Super Cup: 2009

Individual

- Argentine Primera División top scorer: 2008 Apertura (with Lanús), 2009 Clausura (with Lanús), 2016 Primera División (with Lanús)
- Al Ain International Championship top scorer: 2009, 2010
- GCC Golden Boot: 2009–10
- Pro-League top scorer: 2009–10
- Copa Libertadores top scorer: 2017
