= Nicolás Pasquini =

Argentine footballer

Personal information
- Date of birth: 2 January 1991 (age 35)
- Place of birth: Los Surgentes, Argentina
- Height: 1.72 m (5 ft 8 in)
- Position: Left-back

Team information
- Current team: Sarmiento
- Number: 77

Youth career
- Club San Carlos
- 2006–2010: Lanús

Senior career*
Years	Team	Apps	(Gls)
2010–2022	Lanús	188	(5)
2010–2012	→ Atlanta (loan)	23	(0)
2020–2021	→ Estudiantes (loan)	42	(2)
2023	Talleres	8	(0)
2023–2026	Sporting Cristal	84	(1)
2026–	Sarmiento	9	(1)
- * Club domestic league appearances and goals as of 18:15, 10 November 2026 (UTC)

Nicolás Pasquini (born 2 January 1991) is an Argentine professional footballer who plays as a left-back for Argentine Primera División club Sarmiento.

== Career ==
Pasquini began his youth career with Club San Carlos, prior to joining Lanús' system in 2006. In July 2010, Pasquini joined Primera B Metropolitana side Atlanta on loan for two seasons. In his first season, 2010–11, he featured six times as Atlanta won the title and promotion to Primera B Nacional for 2011–12. In tier two, he played seventeen times in a season which ended with relegation. He returned to Lanús in June 2012 and subsequently made his professional debut in the Copa Argentina on 17 April 2013 versus Atlético de Rafaela. His Argentine Primera División debut arrived a month later against Tigre.

One hundred and twenty-two appearances in all competitions followed in his first six seasons with Lanús as the club won the 2013 Copa Sudamericana, the 2016 Argentine Primera División, the 2016 Copa Bicentenario and the 2016 Supercopa Argentina. Over that period, Pasquini scored six times including his first in a league match with Olimpo on 2 September 2013.

== Career statistics ==
As of 22 May 2018.

Club statistics
Club	Season	League			Cup (Note: Includes the Copa Argentina)		League Cup		Continental (Note: Includes the Copa Libertadores and Copa Sudamericana)		Other (Note: Includes the Copa Bicentenario, Supercopa Argentina and Primera División play-offs)		Total	
Club	Season	Division	Apps	Goals	Apps	Goals	Apps	Goals	Apps	Goals	Apps	Goals	Apps	Goals
Lanús	2010–11	Primera División	0	0	0	0	—		—		0	0	0	0
Lanús	2011–12	Primera División	0	0	0	0	—		0	0	0	0	0	0
Lanús	2012–13	Primera División	2	0	1	0	—		—		0	0	3	0
Lanús	2013–14	Primera División	25	3	0	0	—		7 (Note: Five appearances in 2013 Copa Sudamericana, two appearances in 2014 Copa Libertadores)	0	0	0	32	3
Lanús	2014	Primera División	11	1	0	0	—		2 (Note: Two appearances in 2014 Copa Sudamericana)	0	2 (Note: One appearance in 2014 Recopa Sudamericana, one appearance in 2014 Suruga Bank Championship)	0	15	1
Lanús	2015	Primera División	17	0	2	0	—		1 (Note: One appearance in 2015 Copa Sudamericana)	0	3 (Note: Three appearances in 2015 Primera División play-offs)	0	23	0
Lanús	2016	Primera División	9	0	0	0	—		—		1 (Note: One appearance in 2016 Primera División play-offs)	0	10	0
Lanús	2016–17	Primera División	27	0	3	0	—		7 (Note: One appearance in 2016 Copa Sudamericana, six appearances in 2017 Copa Libertadores)	1	2 (Note: One appearance in 2016 Copa Bicentenario, one appearance in 2016 Supercopa Argentina)	1 (Note: One goal in 2016 Supercopa Argentina)	39	2
Lanús	2017–18	Primera División	23	0	1	0	—		10 (Note: Eight appearances in 2017 Copa Libertadores, two appearances in 2018 Copa Sudamericana)	2	0	0	34	2
Lanús	Total		114	4	7	0	—		27	3	8	1	156	8
Atlanta (loan)	2010–11	Primera B Metropolitana	6	0	0	0	—		—		0	0	6	0
Atlanta (loan)	2011–12	Primera B Nacional	17	0	1	0	—		—		0	0	18	0
Atlanta (loan)	Total		23	0	1	0	—		—		0	0	24	0
Career total			137	4	8	0	—		27	3	8	1	180	8

== Honours ==
Atlanta

- Primera B Metropolitana: 2010–11

Lanús

- Copa Sudamericana: 2013
- Argentine Primera División: 2016
- Copa Bicentenario: 2016
- Supercopa Argentina: 2016
