= Román Martínez (footballer, born 1983) =

Argentine footballer

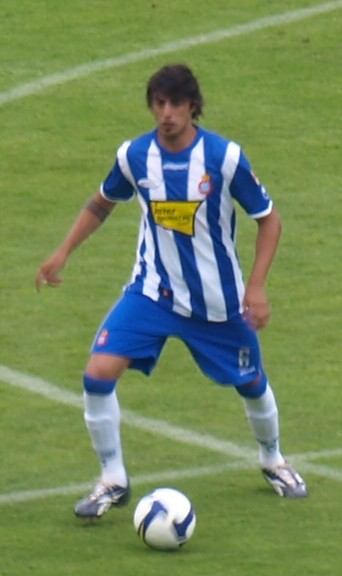
- Martínez playing with Espanyol in 2009

Personal information
- Full name: Román Fernando Martínez Scharner
- Date of birth: 27 March 1983 (age 43)
- Place of birth: Morón, Argentina
- Height: 1.85 m (6 ft 1 in)
- Position: Midfielder

Youth career
- Deportivo Morón

Senior career*
Years	Team	Apps	(Gls)
2000–2004	Deportivo Morón	64	(6)
2004–2008	Arsenal Sarandí	11	(0)
2006–2008	→ Tigre (loan)	70	(9)
2008–2011	Espanyol	32	(5)
2009–2010	→ Tenerife (loan)	23	(5)
2010–2011	→ Tigre (loan)	24	(3)
2011–2012	Tigre	35	(4)
2012–2015	Estudiantes	76	(10)
2015–2018	Lanús	65	(11)
2018	Deportivo Morón	5	(1)
2019	San Lorenzo	4	(1)
2019–2020	Aldosivi	7	(0)
2020–2021	Tigre	3	(0)
2021	Cañuelas	12	(1)
2022	Deportivo Riestra	0	(0)
- * Club domestic league appearances and goals as of 20:27, 13 May 2022 (UTC)

Román Fernando Martínez Scharner (born 27 March 1983) is an Argentine former footballer who played as a midfielder.

== Club career ==
Born in Morón, Buenos Aires, Martínez started his playing career with local Deportivo Morón in 2000. After several seasons playing in the third division, he joined Arsenal de Sarandí of the Primera División.

In 2006, Martínez dropped down to the second level to play for Club Atlético Tigre, but won promotion in his first season. The Apertura 2007 was the club's first year in the top flight since 1980, and the player appeared in nearly all of the team's matches helping to a final second-place finish, the highest in their history.

For the 2008–09 campaign, Martínez signed with Spain's RCD Espanyol. On 13 December 2008 he scored his first goal for the Catalans, in a 1–2 away loss to Valencia CF. Benefitting heavily from Iván de la Peña's constant injury problems, he featured regularly and netted in three consecutive wins in late April/early May 2009, all as a substitute: Sporting de Gijón (3–0), Real Betis (2–0) and again Valencia (3–0, finding the net after just two minutes).

Martínez was subsequently loaned for one season to CD Tenerife, which had returned to La Liga after seven years. In an irregular campaign, where he alternated starts with the bench, he scored four of his five league goals in the last seven matches – which granted the team six points, after wins against Gijón and Racing de Santander– but the Canary Islands side were finally relegated.

Martínez returned to Argentina for 2010–11, re-joining Tigre on a one-year loan.

== Personal life ==
Martínez's younger brother, Nicolás, was also a footballer.

== Career statistics ==
As of match played on 21 February 2018

Appearances and goals by club, season and competition
Club	Season	League			Cup		Other		Total	
Club	Season	Division	Apps	Goals	Apps	Goals	Apps	Goals	Apps	Goals
Espanyol	2008–09	La Liga	32	5	0	0	0	0	32	5
Tenerife (loan)	2009–10	La Liga	23	5	0	0	0	0	23	5
Tigre (loan)	2010–11	Primera División	24	3	0	0	0	0	24	3
Tigre	2011–12	Primera División	35	4	0	0	0	0	35	4
Estudiantes	2012–13	Primera División	32	6	3	0	0	0	35	6
Estudiantes	2013–14	Primera División	28	2	3	1	0	0	31	3
Estudiantes	2014	Primera División	13	2	0	0	5 (Note: Appearance(s) in Copa Sudamericana)	0	18	2
Estudiantes	2015	Primera División	3	0	0	0	3 (Note: Appearances in Copa Libertadores)	0	6	0
Estudiantes	Total		76	10	6	1	8	0	90	11
Lanús	2015	Primera División	16	2	4	1	4	0	24	3
Lanús	2016	Primera División	16	5	3	1	3 (Note: Two appearances in Copa Sudamericana, One appearance in Copa Bicentenario)	0	22	6
Lanús	2016–17	Primera División	22	2	2	0	14 (Note: Thirteen appearances in Copa Libertadores, One appearance in Supercopa Argentina)	0	38	2
Lanús	2017–18	Primera División	10	2	0	0	1	0	11	2
Lanús	Total		64	11	9	2	22	0	95	13
Career totals			254	38	15	3	30	0	299	41
