= Santiago Zurbriggen =

Argentine footballer

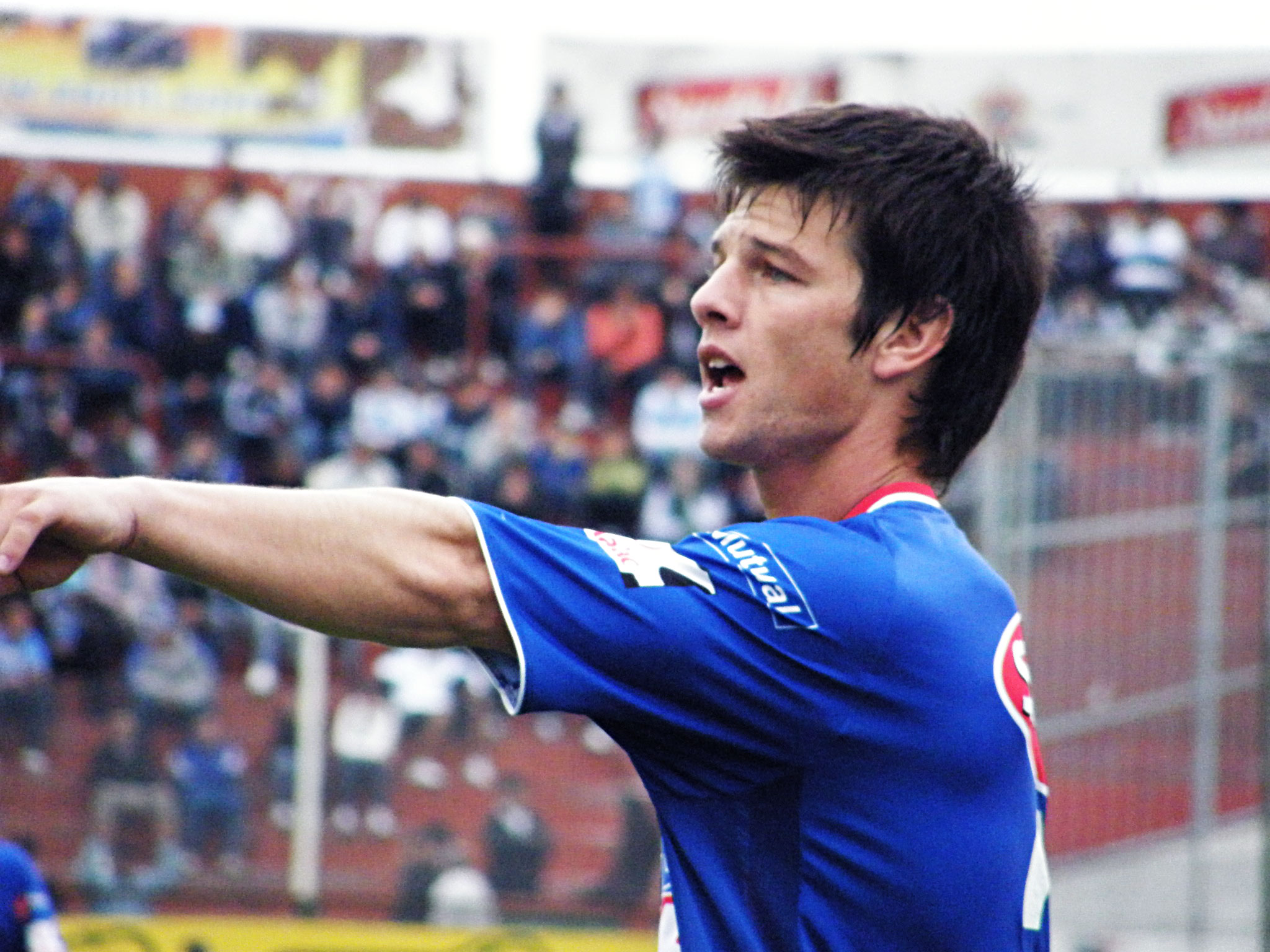

Personal information
- Date of birth: 27 February 1990 (age 36)
- Place of birth: San Jerónimo Norte, Argentina
- Height: 1.77 m (5 ft 10 in)
- Position: Right-back

Team information
- Current team: Estudiantes RC

Youth career
- Unión de Santa Fe

Senior career*
Years	Team	Apps	(Gls)
2009–2016	Unión de Santa Fe	112	(2)
2016–2018	Lanús	12	(0)
2018–2019	Defensa y Justicia	1	(0)
2018–2019	→ Unión de Santa Fe (loan)	6	(1)
2019–2020	Alvarado	15	(0)
2020–2021	Estudiantes BA	26	(2)
2022–2023	Estudiantes RC	44	(2)
2024	COS Sarrabus Ogliastra	2	(0)
2024–2025	Monastir		
2025	COS Sarrabus Ogliastra	6	(0)
- * Club domestic league appearances and goals

Santiago Zurbriggen (born 27 February 1990) is an Argentine former footballer who played as a right-back.
