= Marcelo Herrera (footballer, born 1992) =

Argentine footballer

Personal information
- Full name: Luis Marcelo Herrera
- Date of birth: 26 February 1992 (age 34)
- Place of birth: Ledesma, Argentina
- Height: 1.85 m (6 ft 1 in)
- Position: Centre-back

Team information
- Current team: Gimnasia y Tiro

Youth career
- Club Ledesma
- Nueva Chicago
- Lanús

Senior career*
Years	Team	Apps	(Gls)
2012–2019	Lanús	47	(1)
2014	→ Talleres (loan)	0	(0)
2015	→ Olimpo (loan)	12	(1)
2019	→ Belgrano (loan)	9	(0)
2019	→ Defensa y Justicia (loan)	2	(0)
2020–2021	Godoy Cruz	5	(0)
2021	Sarmiento	1	(0)
2022–2023	Deportes La Serena	18	(2)
2023	Agropecuario	18	(0)
2023–2024	Bhayangkara	12	(1)
2024	Agropecuario	10	(0)
2025–	Gimnasia y Tiro	4	(0)
- * Club domestic league appearances and goals as of 17:12, 11 August 2025 (UTC)

Luis Marcelo Herrera (born 26 February 1992) is an Argentine professional footballer who plays as a centre-back for Primera Nacional club Gimnasia y Tiro.

== Career ==
Herrera had youth spells with Club Ledesma and Nueva Chicago before joining Lanús. His Lanús senior career began in 2012, he was an unused substitute for a win over San Martín in the Argentine Primera División on 15 November. His professional debut arrived later in the 2012–13 season, on 11 March 2013, against Arsenal de Sarandí. He made two more appearances in all competitions for Lanús, prior to leaving on loan in July 2014 to play for Torneo Federal A's Talleres. Fourteen appearances followed as the club were beaten in a promotion play-off final. On 19 January 2015, Herrera joined Primera División side Olimpo on loan.

His first senior goal came in his tenth appearance versus Gimnasia y Esgrima on 3 October. In total, Herrera scored one goal in fourteen games for Olimpo. He went on to play forty-three times over the following two seasons for Lanús, whilst also scoring his first goal for the club during a 4–2 victory against Banfield in April 2017. January 2019 saw Herrera sign for Belgrano.

== Career statistics ==
As of 4 January 2019.

Club statistics
Club	Season	League			Cup (Note: Includes the Copa Argentina)		League Cup		Continental (Note: Includes the Copa Libertadores and Copa Sudamericana)		Other (Note: Includes the Copa Bicentenario, Supercopa Argentina, Torneo Federal A play-offs and Primera División play-offs)		Total	
Club	Season	Division	Apps	Goals	Apps	Goals	Apps	Goals	Apps	Goals	Apps	Goals	Apps	Goals
Lanús	2012–13	Primera División	1	0	1	0	—		—		0	0	2	0
Lanús	2013–14	Primera División	1	0	0	0	—		0	0	0	0	1	0
Lanús	2014	Primera División	0	0	0	0	—		0	0	0	0	0	0
Lanús	2015	Primera División	0	0	0	0	—		0	0	0	0	0	0
Lanús	2016	Primera División	6	0	0	0	—		—		0	0	6	0
Lanús	2016–17	Primera División	25	1	3	0	—		7 (Note: Two appearances in 2016 Copa Sudamericana, five appearances in 2017 Copa Libertadores)	0	2 (Note: One appearance in 2016 Copa Bicentenario, one appearance in 2016 Supercopa Argentina)	0	37	1
Lanús	2017–18	Primera División	12	0	1	0	—		2 (Note: Two appearances in 2017 Copa Libertadores)	0	0	0	15	0
Lanús	2018–19	Primera División	3	0	1	0	—		2	0	0	0	6	0
Lanús	Total		48	1	6	0	—		11	0	2	0	67	1
Talleres (loan)	2014	Torneo Federal A	9	0	1	0	—		—		4 (Note: Four appearances in 2014 Torneo Federal A play-offs)	0	14	0
Olimpo (loan)	2015	Primera División	12	1	0	0	—		—		2 (Note: Two appearances in 2015 Primera División play-offs)	0	14	1
Belgrano	2018–19	Primera División	0	0	0	0	—		—		0	0	0	0
Career total			63	2	7	0	—		11	0	8	0	89	2

== Honours ==
Lanús

- Argentine Primera División: 2016
- Copa Bicentenario: 2016
- Supercopa Argentina: 2016
