= Willian Candia =

Paraguayan footballer (born 1993)

Personal information
- Full name: Willian Benito Candia Garay
- Date of birth: 27 March 1993 (age 33)
- Place of birth: San Roque González de Santa Cruz, Paraguay
- Height: 1.72 m (5 ft 8 in)
- Position: Midfielder

Team information
- Current team: Atlético Tembetary
- Number: 20

Youth career
- 2012: Cerro Porteño

Senior career*
Years	Team	Apps	(Gls)
2013–2014	Cerro Porteño	24	(0)
2015–2016	Deportivo Capiatá	52	(2)
2016	Racing	0	(0)
2017–2018	Cerro Porteño	41	(5)
2019–2022	Olimpia	37	(5)
2021	→ River Plate Asunción (loan)	13	(0)
2023	Nacional	13	(1)
2023	Resistencia	19	(1)
2024–	Atlético Tembetary	23	(5)
- * Club domestic league appearances and goals as of 21 September 2024

Willian Benito Candia Garay (born 23 March 1993) is a Paraguayan professional footballer who plays as midfielder for Atlético Tembetary.

== Career statistics ==
As of 24 September 2020

Club	Season	League			Cup		Continental		Other		Total	
Club	Season	Division	Apps	Goals	Apps	Goals	Apps	Goals	Apps	Goals	Apps	Goals
Cerro Porteño	2013	Paraguayan	16	0	—		—		—		16	0
Cerro Porteño	2014	Paraguayan	8	0	—		2 (Note: All appearance(s) in Copa Libertadores)	0	—		10	0
Cerro Porteño	Subtotal		24	0	—		2	0	—		26	0
Deportivo Capiatá	2015	Paraguayan	37	2	—		—		—		37	2
Deportivo Capiatá	2016	Paraguayan	15	0	—		—		—		15	0
Deportivo Capiatá	Subtotal		52	2	—		—		—		52	2
Racing	2016–17	Argentine	0	0	0	0	—		—		0	0
Cerro Porteño	2017	Paraguayan	24	2	—		5 (Note: All appearance(s) in Copa Sudamericana)	1	—		29	3
Cerro Porteño	2018	Paraguayan	17	3	—		3	0	—		20	3
Cerro Porteño	Subtotal		41	5	—		8	1	—		49	6
Olimpia	2019	Paraguayan	15	3	—		3	0	—		18	3
Olimpia	2020	Paraguayan	8	1	—		1	0	—		9	1
Olimpia	Subtotal		23	4	—		4	0	—		27	4
Career total			140	11	0	0	14	1	0	0	154	12
