= Lautaro Acosta =

Argentine footballer (born 1988)

Personal information
- Full name: Lautaro Germán Acosta
- Date of birth: 14 March 1988 (age 38)
- Place of birth: Glew, Argentina
- Height: 1.69 m (5 ft 7 in)
- Position: Winger

Youth career
- Lanús

Senior career*
Years	Team	Apps	(Gls)
2006–2008	Lanús	55	(5)
2008–2013	Sevilla	23	(0)
2011–2012	→ Racing Santander (loan)	21	(2)
2012–2013	→ Boca Juniors (loan)	22	(0)
2013–2025	Lanús	280	(39)
Total		401	(46)

International career
2007	Argentina U20	12	(1)
2008	Argentina Olympic	4	(3)
2017	Argentina	2	(0)
Medal record
Representing Argentina
Olympic Games
Gold medal – first place	2008 Beijing
- * Club domestic league appearances and goals

Lautaro Germán Acosta (born 14 March 1988) is an Argentine former professional footballer who played as a winger.

He started and finished his career at Lanús, making his debut with the first team at 18. He also spent four years in the Spanish La Liga, signing with Sevilla in 2008.

Acosta played twice for Argentina, in 2017.

== Club career ==
=== Lanús ===
Born in Glew, Buenos Aires, Almirante Brown Partido, Acosta came through the youth system at Club Atlético Lanús, making his senior debut at the age of 18. As the club was often forced to sell its best players, he quickly became an important part of the first team.

Acosta was part of the Lanús squad that won the 2007 Apertura tournament, their first ever Primera División title. In May 2007, he suffered a serious cheekbone injury, and had to wear a specially-fitted face mask for two months.

=== Sevilla ===
On 29 May 2008, aged 20, Acosta signed for La Liga team Sevilla FC on a five-year contract, for a reported fee of €7 million subject to a medical. Shortly after his arrival in Andalusia, he suffered a serious injury and never fully recovered, his best output consisting of ten league games in 2010–11 (267 minutes, only two starts).

On 4 February 2009, Acosta scored his first – and only – goal for Sevilla, in the first leg of the Copa del Rey semi-finals, a 2–1 home win against Athletic Bilbao but an eventual 4–2 aggregate loss. In July 2011 he was loaned to fellow top-division side Racing de Santander, joining compatriots Ariel Nahuelpan and Héctor Cúper (manager); he started and netted on his official debut for the Cantabrians, but in a 4–3 away defeat to Valencia CF.

=== Return home ===
Acosta returned to his country in 2012, going on to represent Boca Juniors and his former club Lanús. He was a key attacking element in five of the six titles won after his return, including the 2016 national championship. In October 2014, whilst at the service of the latter, he was kidnapped, threatened at gunpoint, assaulted and robbed after being led to his home.

== International career ==
In 2007, Acosta was picked to join the Argentina under-20 squad to compete in the 2007 South American U-20 Championship in Paraguay. He headed the only goal in the last game against Uruguay, to secure the national team's qualification for both the 2007 FIFA U-20 World Cup and the 2008 Summer Olympics.

After appearing in six out of seven games in the under-20s triumph in Canada, Acosta scored against Ivory Coast in a 2–1 group stage win in the Beijing Olympic tournament, en route to another international conquest. He was selected by the full side for a Copa América Centenario provisional squad, but did not make the final cut.

Acosta received his first senior call-up by coach Jorge Sampaoli on 27 August 2017, for 2018 FIFA World Cup qualifiers against Uruguay and Venezuela. He earned his first cap against the former four days later, coming on as a substitute for Marcos Acuña at the hour-mark of an eventual 0–0 away draw.

== Career statistics ==
Appearances and goals by club, season and competition
Club	Season	League			National Cup		League Cup		Continental		Other		Total	
Club	Season	Division	Apps	Goals	Apps	Goals	Apps	Goals	Apps	Goals	Apps	Goals	Apps	Goals
Lanús	2005–06	Argentine Primera División	8	0	–		–		0	0	–		8	0
Lanús	2006–07	Argentine Primera División	23	3	–		–		3 (Note: Appearances in Copa Sudamericana)	0	–		26	3
Lanús	2007–08	Argentine Primera División	24	2	–		–		10 (Note: Seven appearances and three goals in Copa Libertadores, three appearances in Copa Sudamericana)	3	–		34	5
Lanús	Total		55	5	–		–		13	3	–		68	8
Sevilla	2008–09	La Liga	7	0	0	0	–		2	0	–		9	0
Sevilla	2009–10	La Liga	6	0	0	0	–		1	0	–		7	0
Sevilla	2010–11	La Liga	10	0	3	1	–		0	0	–		13	1
Sevilla	Total		23	0	3	1	–		3	0	–		29	1
Racing Santander (loan)	2011–12	La Liga	21	2	2	0	–		–		–		23	2
Boca Juniors (loan)	2012–13	Argentine Primera División	22	0	1	0	–		5 (Note: Three appearances in Copa Libertadores, two appearances in Copa Sudamericana)	0	1 (Note: Appearance in Supercopa Argentina)	0	29	0
Lanús	2013–14	Argentine Primera División	15	4	1	0	0	0	15 (Note: Eight appearances and one goal in Copa Libertadores, seven appearances and one goal in Copa Sudamericana)	2	0	0	31	6
Lanús	2014	Argentine Primera División	18	5	2	0	0	0	0	0	2 (Note: Appearances in Recopa Sudamericana)	1	22	6
Lanús	2015	Argentine Primera División	27	6	2	0	0	0	0	0	0	0	29	6
Lanús	2016	Argentine Primera División	14	3	3	0	0	0	2	0	1 (Note: Appearance in Copa del Bicentenario de la Independencia)	0	20	3
Lanús	2016–17	Argentine Primera División	24	5	3	0	0	0	6	2	1	0	34	5
Lanús	2017–18	Argentine Primera División	21	3	1	0	0	0	11 (Note: Eight appearances and one goal in Copa Libertadores, three appearances and one goal in Copa Sudamericana)	2	0	0	33	5
Lanús	2018–19	Argentine Primera División	23	3	1	0	0	0	0	0	0	0	24	3
Lanús	2019–20	Argentine Primera División	17	2	1	0	0	0	0	0	0	0	18	2
Lanús	2020	Argentine Primera División	5	0	1	0	0	0	8	2	0	0	14	2
Lanús	2021	Argentine Primera División	28	2	0	0	9	0	3	1	0	0	40	3
Lanús	2022	Argentine Primera División	21	4	0	0	8	1	8	0	0	0	37	5
Lanús	2023	Argentine Primera División	19	0	0	0	9	1	0	0	0	0	28	1
Lanús	2024	Argentine Primera División	18	0	0	0	0	0	5	1	0	0	23	1
Lanús	2025	Argentine Primera División	9	1	1	0	0	0	3	0	0	0	13	1
Lanús	Total		280	39	16	0	26	2	61	10	4	1	387	52
Career total			401	46	22	1	26	2	82	13	5	1	536	63

== Honours ==
Lanús

- Argentine Primera División: 2007 Apertura, 2016
- Copa Sudamericana: 2013, 2025
- Supercopa Argentina: 2016
- Copa Bicentenario: 2016

Argentina

- FIFA U-20 World Cup: 2007
- Summer Olympic Games: 2008
