= José Luis Gómez (footballer) =

Argentine footballer

Personal information
- Full name: José Luis Gómez
- Date of birth: September 10, 1993 (age 33)
- Place of birth: Santiago del Estero, Argentina
- Height: 1.73 m (5 ft 8 in)
- Position: Right-back

Youth career
- Racing Club

Senior career*
Years	Team	Apps	(Gls)
2013–2017	Racing Club	28	(0)
2015	→ San Martín SJ (loan)	28	(3)
2016–2017	→ Lanús (loan)	42	(1)
2017–2021	Lanús	16	(0)
2021	Huracán	0	(0)
2022–2023	Racing Club	0	(0)
2024	San Martín SJ	11	(0)

International career
2017–	Argentina	1	(0)
- * Club domestic league appearances and goals as of 16:22, 31 May 2025 (UTC)

José Luis Gómez (born September 10, 1993) is an Argentine footballer who plays as a right-back. In 2014, he won the league with Racing Club.

== Honours ==
=== International ===
Argentina

- Superclásico de las Américas: 2017
