= Nicolás Aguirre (footballer, born 1990) =

Argentine footballer (born 1990)

Personal information
- Full name: Nicolás Diego Aguirre
- Date of birth: 27 June 1990 (age 36)
- Place of birth: Chabás, Argentina
- Height: 1.81 m (5 ft 11 in)
- Position: Midfielder

Team information
- Current team: Unión Tarija
- Number: 32

Youth career
- Arsenal de Sarandí

Senior career*
Years	Team	Apps	(Gls)
2008–2015	Arsenal de Sarandí	109	(10)
2010–2011	→ Atlético Rafaela (loan)	27	(1)
2015–2018	Lanús	58	(8)
2018	Chongqing Lifan	5	(0)
2018–2019	Granada	16	(1)
2020–2021	Atlético Tucumán	18	(1)
2021–2022	Sport Recife	0	(0)
2022	Atlético Rafaela	11	(2)
2023	Arsenal de Sarandí	3	(0)
2024	Provincial Ovalle	8	(2)
2024	San Miguel	4	(0)
2025	Huracán Chabás	–	(–)
2025–	Unión Tarija	–	(–)
- * Club domestic league appearances and goals as of 12 March 2024

Nicolás Diego Aguirre (Spanish pronunciation: [nikoˈlas aˈɣire]; born 27 June 1990) is an Argentine footballer who plays as a midfielder for Bolivian club Unión Tarija.

== Club career ==
Born in Chabás, Aguirre graduated from the youth setup of Arsenal de Sarandí and made his first team debut on 9 November 2008, in a 1–0 defeat against Boca Juniors. On 29 March 2010, he scored his first goal for the club in a 1–0 victory against San Lorenzo. In July, he was loaned to second-tier club Atlético Rafaela.

After amassing more than 100 appearances for Arsenal, Aguirre moved to Lanús on 12 February 2015 as a replacement for the injured Sebastián Leto. On 12 April, he scored his first goal for the club in a 2–1 victory over Banfield. In June 2016, he suffered a muscle injury in his leg, which ruled him out of play for 1 month. With the signing of Miguel Almirón, his playing time became limited in the 2016 season.

On 2 February 2018, Aguirre moved abroad for the first time and joined Chinese Super League club Chongqing Dangdai Lifan.

On 8 July 2018, Aguirre joined Segunda División side Granada CF, a club also owned by Jiang Lizhang, for one year on a free transfer. He left the club at the end of the season. He remained without club until 19 January 2020, where he signed a deal until June 2021 with Atlético Tucumán.

On 15 September 2021, Aguirre joined Brazilian club Sport Club do Recife. After the move, the club made a mistake and didn't register him, so he couldn't play for the club for the rest of 2021. In February 2021, Aguirre returned to his former club Atlético de Rafaela.

In 2024, he moved to Chile and signed with Provincial Ovalle in the Segunda División Profesional.

After a brief stint with Huracán de Chabás, Aguirre moved to Bolivia and joined Unión Tarija on 5 August 2025.

== Career statistics ==
As of match played on 19 May 2018

Club	Season	League			Cup		Continental		Total	
Club	Season	Division	Apps	Goals	Apps	Goals	Apps	Goals	Apps	Goals
Arsenal de Sarandí	2008–09	Primera División	6	0			2 (Note: Appearances in Copa Sudamericana)	0	8	0
Arsenal de Sarandí	2009–10	Primera División	6	1			—		6	1
Arsenal de Sarandí	2011–12	Primera División	34	3	2	0	11 (Note: Appearances in Copa Sudamericana and Copa Libertadores)	1	47	4
Arsenal de Sarandí	2012–13	Primera División	26	3	7	2	4 (Note: Appearances in Copa Libertadores)	1	37	6
Arsenal de Sarandí	2013–14	Primera División	23	2	2	0	4	0	29	2
Arsenal de Sarandí	2014	Primera División	14	1	0	0	—		14	1
Arsenal de Sarandí	Total		109	10	11	2	21	2	141	14
Atlético Rafaela (loan)	2010–11	Primera B Nacional	27	1	0	0	—		27	1
Lanús	2015	Primera División	22	6	4	0	3	1	29	7
Lanús	2016	Primera División	13	1	2	1	1	0	16	2
Lanús	2016–17	Primera División	19	1	1	0	—		20	1
Lanús	2017–18	Primera División	4	0	1	0	10	1	15	1
Lanús	Total		58	8	8	1	14	2	80	11
Chongqing Lifan	2018	Chinese Super League	5	0	1	0	—		6	0
Granada	2018–19	Segunda División	0	0	0	0	—		0	0
Career total			199	19	20	3	35	4	254	26
