= Diego Braghieri =

Argentine football defender

Personal information
- Full name: Diego Luis Braghieri
- Date of birth: 23 February 1987 (age 39)
- Place of birth: Las Parejas, Argentina
- Height: 1.86 m (6 ft 1 in)
- Position: Centre-back

Team information
- Current team: Deportivo Madryn

Youth career
- Rosario Central

Senior career*
Years	Team	Apps	(Gls)
2007–2012	Rosario Central	105	(3)
2011–2012	→ Lanús (loan)	18	(2)
2012–2014	Arsenal de Sarandí	59	(4)
2014–2017	Lanús	19	(0)
2018	Atlético Nacional	5	(0)
2019–2020	Tijuana	31	(1)
2020–2021	Atlético Nacional	5	(1)
2021	San Lorenzo	19	(0)
2021–2023	Lanús	39	(3)
2024–	Deportivo Madryn	22	(1)
- * Club domestic league appearances and goals as of 20 September 2024

Diego Luis Braghieri (born 23 February 1987) is an Argentine football defender who plays for Argentinian club Deportivo Madryn.

== Career ==
Braghieri began playing in the Rosario Central youth development system. He made his debut for the first team in a Primera División match against Estudiantes de La Plata on 24 March 2007. He scored his first goal for the club in a 3–0 home win against Arsenal de Sarandí on 17 September 2008.

In July 2011, Braghieri joined Lanús on loan for one year. He then joined Arsenal de Sarandí where he played for two years. In June 2014, he signed for Lanús on a permanent basis.
