= Supercopa Argentina =

- Organiser(s): AFA
- Founded: 2012; 14 years ago
- Region: Argentina
- Teams: 2
- Related competitions: Copa Argentina; Primera División
- Current champions: Estudiantes (LP) (2025)
- Most championships: River Plate (3 titles)
- Broadcaster(s): ESPN Premium; TNT Sports
- Website: copaargentina.org/supercopa
- 2024 Supercopa Argentina

The Supercopa Argentina (English: Argentine Super Cup) is an official national association football cup of Argentina organized by the Argentine Football Association (AFA). The annual football match was played for the first time in 2012, being contested by the reigning champions of the Primera División and Copa Argentina.

== History ==
The idea of an Argentine "Supercup" came up in 2012 when the Argentine Football Association (AFA), in an attempt to bring innovation to the current system, established a competition that would be contested by champions of Primera División and Copa Argentina, taking inspiration from European cups.

The first Supercopa was held that same year when Boca Juniors (champion of Copa Argentina relaunched in 2011) faced Arsenal de Sarandí (champion of 2012 Torneo Clausura) at Estadio Bicentenario in San Fernando del Valle de Catamarca. After the match ended in a 0–0 draw, Arsenal won 4–3 in a penalty shoot-out, which gave the club its first national cup ever. Goalkeeper Cristian Campestrini was Arsenal's most valuable player after stopping three penalties.

For the second edition in 2012, AFA modified its statute to allow winner of 2013 Copa Campeonato (also named "Superfinal") to play against the winner of Copa Argentina. The "Superfinal" was a short-lived national cup contested by champions of Inicial and Final tournaments to decide the champion of the entire season. Although Copa Campeonato was in fact a national cup, the 2013 edition won by Vélez Sársfield defeating Newell's Old Boys was considered by AFA as a league title, therefore Vélez Sársfield played the Supercopa as Primera División champion.

As the 2019–20 Copa Argentina edition had been delayed due to COVID-19 pandemic (it ended in December 2021, being won by Boca Juniors) the AFA did not held the 2020 Supercopa. Instead, the Association chose to held the 2021 edition, scheduling it for March 2022. Nevertheless, the match was not played due to scheduling problems.

In October 2022, it was announced that the Supercopa will be held in Abu Dhabi, United Arab Emirates, after an agreement between the Argentine Football Association (AFA) and the local Sports Council which includes four editions of the competition (up to 2026). Two months later, AFA announced that the winner of Trofeo de Campeones (Racing in 2022) would contest the tournament leaving the winner of Copa Argentina (Patronato in 2022) out of the competition. No reasons were given after the decision.

Finally the AFA created an international version of Supercopa Argentina named "Supercopa Internacional" to be held in Abu Dhabi to fulfil the previous commitment, contested between winners of Primera División and Trofeo de Campeones. On the other hand, the Supercopa Argentina will continue as usually.

== List of champions ==
Keys

- CA: Winner of Copa Argentina.
- PD: Winner of Primera División
- TC: Winner of Trofeo de Campeones
- (In bracket, title count):

Ed.	Year	Winner	Score	Runner-up	Venue	City	Ref.
1	2012	Arsenal (1) (PD)	0–0 (4–3 p)	Boca Juniors (CA)	Bicentenario	Catamarca	
2	2013	Vélez Sarsfield (1) (PD) (Note: Vélez contested the competition as winner of 2012–13 "Superfinal", which was recognised as a Primera División title by AFA.)	1–0	Arsenal (CA)	Juan G. Funes	San Luis	
3	2014	Huracán (1) (CA)	1–0	River Plate (PD)	Bicentenario	San Juan	
4	2015	San Lorenzo (1) (PD) (Note: As Boca Juniors had won both competitions, Primera División and Copa Argentina, San Lorenzo contested the Supercopa as PD runner-up.)	4–0	Boca Juniors (PD & CA)	Mario A. Kempes	Córdoba	
5	2016	Lanús (1) (PD)	3–0	River Plate (CA)	Estadio Único	La Plata	
6	2017	River Plate (1) (CA)	2–0	Boca Juniors (PD)	Malvinas Argentinas	Mendoza	
7	2018	Boca Juniors (1) (PD)	0–0 (6–5 p)	Rosario Central (CA)	Malvinas Argentinas	Mendoza	
8	2019	River Plate (2) (CA)	5–0	Racing (PD)	Madre de Ciudades	Santiago del Estero	
–	2020	(not held because of COVID-19 pandemic in Argentina)					
–	2021	(not held due to scheduling problems) (Note: AFA announced that this final would be the 2021 edition, leaving 2020 vacant. As all AFA competitions were delayed because of the COVID-19 pandemic, the Association had not determined which team would be the rival of Boca Juniors (champion of both competitions, 2019-20 Primera División and 2019–20 Copa Argentina). Some sources stated it could probably be the winner of the most recent edition of Trofeo de Campeones (River Plate in 2021), but it was not confirmed either.)					
9	2022	Boca Juniors (2) (PD)	3–0	Patronato (CA)	Madre de Ciudades	Santiago del Estero	
10	2023	River Plate (3) (PD)	2–1	Estudiantes (LP) (CA)	Mario A. Kempes	Córdoba	
11	2024	Vélez Sarsfield (2) (PD)	2–0	Central Córdoba (SdE) (CA)	Gigante de Arroyito	Rosario	
12	2025	Estudiantes (LP) (1) (TC)	3–2 (a.e.t.)	Independiente Rivadavia (CA)	Julio C. Villagra	Córdoba	

== Records ==
Rank	Club	Titles	Runners-up	Seasons won	Seasons runner-up
1	River Plate	3	2	2017, 2019, 2023	2014, 2016
2	Boca Juniors	2	3	2018, 2022	2012, 2015, 2017
2	Vélez Sarsfield	2	0	2013, 2024	—
3	Arsenal	1	1	2012	2013
3	Estudiantes (LP)	1	1	2025	2023
3	Huracán	1	0	2014	—
3	San Lorenzo	1	0	2015	—
3	Lanús	1	0	2016	—
—	Rosario Central	0	1	—	2018
—	Racing	0	1	—	2019
—	Patronato	0	1	—	2022
—	Central Córdoba (SdE)	0	1	—	2024
—	Independiente Rivadavia	0	1	—	2025
