= 2018 Copa Sudamericana second stage =

The 2018 Copa Sudamericana second stage was played from 17 July to 16 August 2018. A total of 32 teams competed in the second stage to decide the 16 places in the final stages of the 2018 Copa Sudamericana.

== Draw ==
The draw for the second stage was held on 4 June 2018, 20:00 PYT (UTC−4), at the CONMEBOL Convention Centre in Luque, Paraguay. For the second stage, the teams were allocated to two pots according to their previous results in this season:

- Pot 1: 10 teams transferred from the Copa Libertadores and six best winners of the first stage from the Copa Sudamericana
- Pot 2: 16 remaining winners of the first stage from the Copa Sudamericana

The 32 teams were drawn into 16 ties (O1–O16) between a team from Pot 1 and a team from Pot 2, with the teams from Pot 1 hosting the second leg. Teams from the same association could be drawn into the same tie.

The following were the 10 teams transferred from the Copa Libertadores (two best teams eliminated in the third stage of qualifying and eight third-placed teams in the group stage).

Match	Best teams eliminated in third stage	Second stage draw
G3	(Bolivia) Jorge Wilstermann	Pot 1
G2	(Argentina) Banfield	Pot 1
Group	Third-placed teams in group stage	Second stage draw
A	(Uruguay) Defensor Sporting	Pot 1
B	(Bolivia) Bolívar	Pot 1
C	(Uruguay) Peñarol	Pot 1
D	(Colombia) Santa Fe	Pot 1
E	(Brazil) Vasco da Gama	Pot 1
F	(Uruguay) Nacional	Pot 1
G	(Colombia) Millonarios	Pot 1
H	(Colombia) Junior	Pot 1

The following were the 22 winners of the first stage from the Copa Sudamericana. Matches in the first stage were considered for the ranking of teams for the second stage draw.

Pos	Match	First stage winners	Pld	W	D	L	GF	GA	GD	Pts	Second stage draw
1	E20	(Argentina) Colón	2	2	0	0	3	0	+3	6	Pot 1
2	E15	(Peru) Sport Huancayo	2	1	1	0	3	0	+3	4	Pot 1
3	E2	(Chile) Deportes Temuco	2	1	1	0	3	1	+2	4	Pot 1
4	E8	(Uruguay) Cerro	2	1	1	0	2	0	+2	4	Pot 1
5	E18	(Ecuador) El Nacional	2	1	1	0	4	3	+1	4	Pot 1
6	E21	(Brazil) Botafogo	2	1	1	0	3	2	+1	4	Pot 1
7	E10	(Paraguay) General Díaz	2	1	1	0	2	1	+1	4	Pot 2
8	E17	(Brazil) São Paulo	2	1	1	0	1	0	+1	4	Pot 2
9	E5	(Argentina) San Lorenzo	2	1	1	0	1	0	+1	4	Pot 2
10	E19	(Brazil) Bahia	2	1	0	1	4	1	+3	3	Pot 2
11	E4	(Colombia) Deportivo Cali	2	1	0	1	5	3	+2	3	Pot 2
12	E14	(Brazil) Atlético Paranaense	2	1	0	1	4	2	+2	3	Pot 2
13	E16	(Uruguay) Boston River	2	1	0	1	4	2	+2	3	Pot 2
14	E12	(Uruguay) Rampla Juniors	2	1	0	1	4	2	+2	3	Pot 2
15	E13	(Argentina) Defensa y Justicia	2	1	0	1	3	1	+2	3	Pot 2
16	E3	(Argentina) Lanús	2	1	0	1	5	4	+1	3	Pot 2
17	E22	(Brazil) Fluminense	2	1	0	1	3	2	+1	3	Pot 2
18	E6	(Ecuador) LDU Quito	2	1	0	1	4	4	0	3	Pot 2
19	E9	(Paraguay) Sol de América	2	1	0	1	3	3	0	3	Pot 2
20	E1	(Venezuela) Caracas	2	1	0	1	2	2	0	3	Pot 2
21	E11	(Ecuador) Deportivo Cuenca	2	1	0	1	2	2	0	3	Pot 2
22	E7	(Paraguay) Nacional	2	0	2	0	0	0	0	2	Pot 2

Source: CONMEBOL
Rules for classification: 1) Points; 2) Goal difference; 3) Goals scored; 4) Away goals scored; 5) CONMEBOL ranking (Regulations Article 21).

== Format ==
In the second stage, each tie was played on a home-and-away two-legged basis. If tied on aggregate, the away goals rule would be used. If still tied, extra time would not be played, and the penalty shoot-out would be used to determine the winner (Regulations Article 27).

The 16 winners of the second stage advanced to the round of 16 of the knockout stages.

== Matches ==
The first legs were played on 17–19, 25–26 July, and 1–2 August, and the second legs were played on 24, 31 July, 1–2, 7–9 and 14–16 August 2018.

Team 1	Agg.	Team 2	1st leg	2nd leg
General Díaz (Paraguay)	1–5	(Colombia) Millonarios	1–1	0–4
Nacional (Paraguay)	2–3	(Brazil) Botafogo	2–1	0–2
Sol de América (Paraguay)	0–1	(Uruguay) Nacional	0–0	0–1
São Paulo (Brazil)	1–1 (3–5 p)	(Argentina) Colón	0–1	1–0
Boston River (Uruguay)	1–2	(Argentina) Banfield	1–0	0–2
Fluminense (Brazil)	3–0	(Uruguay) Defensor Sporting	2–0	1–0
Atlético Paranaense (Brazil)	6–1	(Uruguay) Peñarol	2–0	4–1
Deportivo Cali (Colombia)	6–1	(Bolivia) Bolívar	4–0	2–1
LDU Quito (Ecuador)	3–2	(Brazil) Vasco da Gama	3–1	0–1
Caracas (Venezuela)	6–3	(Peru) Sport Huancayo	2–0	4–3
Deportivo Cuenca (Ecuador)	4–4 (6–5 p)	(Bolivia) Jorge Wilstermann	2–2	2–2
Defensa y Justicia (Argentina)	2–1	(Ecuador) El Nacional	2–0	0–1
Lanús (Argentina)	1–1 (2–3 p)	(Colombia) Junior	1–0	0–1
San Lorenzo (Argentina)	3–1	(Chile) Deportes Temuco	3–0	0–1
Bahia (Brazil)	3–1	(Uruguay) Cerro	2–0	1–1
Rampla Juniors (Uruguay)	0–2	(Colombia) Santa Fe	0–0	0–2

Notes

1. CONMEBOL awarded San Lorenzo a 3–0 win as a result of Deportes Temuco fielding the ineligible player Jonathan Requena. The match originally ended 1–2.

=== Match O1 ===
26 July 2018
20:45 UTC−4

General Díaz (Paraguay)	1–1	(Colombia) Millonarios
Giménez 80'	Report	Del Valle 52' (pen.)

Estadio Defensores del Chaco, Asunción (Note: General Díaz played their home match at Estadio Defensores del Chaco, Asunción, instead of their regular stadium Estadio General Adrián Jara, Luque.)
Referee: Gery Vargas (Bolivia)

15 August 2018
19:45 UTC−5

Millonarios (Colombia)	4–0	(Paraguay) General Díaz
Hauche 30'; Ovelar 37'; Del Valle 78'; Silva 85'	Report

Estadio El Campín, Bogotá
Referee: Julio Bascuñán (Chile)

Millonarios won 5–1 on aggregate and advanced to the round of 16 (Match A).

=== Match O2 ===
1 August 2018
18:30 UTC−4

Nacional (Paraguay)	2–1	(Brazil) Botafogo
Santacruz 9'; Vieyra 51'	Report	Luiz Fernando 30'

Estadio Defensores del Chaco, Asunción (Note: Nacional played their home match at Estadio Defensores del Chaco, Asunción, instead of their regular stadium Estadio Arsenio Erico, Asunción.)
Referee: Roberto Tobar (Chile)

16 August 2018
19:30 UTC−3

Botafogo (Brazil)	2–0	(Paraguay) Nacional
Rodrigo Lindoso 37'; Valencia 88'	Report

Estádio Olímpico Nilton Santos, Rio de Janeiro
Referee: Patricio Loustau (Argentina)

Botafogo won 3–2 on aggregate and advanced to the round of 16 (Match B).

=== Match O3 ===
18 July 2018
20:45 UTC−4

Sol de América (Paraguay)	0–0	(Uruguay) Nacional
	Report

Estadio Defensores del Chaco, Asunción (Note: Sol de América played their home match at Estadio Defensores del Chaco, Asunción, instead of their regular stadium Estadio Luis Alfonso Giagni, Villa Elisa.)
Referee: Anderson Daronco (Brazil)

14 August 2018
21:45 UTC−3

Nacional (Uruguay)	1–0	(Paraguay) Sol de América
Zunino 19'	Report

Estadio Gran Parque Central, Montevideo
Referee: Roddy Zambrano (Ecuador)

Nacional won 1–0 on aggregate and advanced to the round of 16 (Match C).

=== Match O4 ===
2 August 2018
19:30 UTC−3

São Paulo (Brazil)	0–1	(Argentina) Colón
	Report	Fritzler 79'

Estádio do Morumbi, São Paulo
Attendance: 35,666
Referee: Leodán González (Uruguay)

16 August 2018
21:45 UTC−3

Colón (Argentina)	0–1	(Brazil) São Paulo
	Report	Liziero 71'
Penalties
Ruiz (penalty scored); Estigarribia (penalty scored); Correa (penalty scored); Fritzler (penalty scored); Ortiz (penalty scored)	5–3	(penalty scored) Nenê; (penalty scored) Reinaldo; (penalty scored) Hudson; (penalty missed) Bruno Alves

Estadio Brigadier General Estanislao López, Santa Fe
Referee: Mario Díaz de Vivar (Paraguay)

Tied 1–1 on aggregate, Colón won on penalties and advanced to the round of 16 (Match D).

=== Match O5 ===
25 July 2018
21:45 UTC−3

Boston River (Uruguay)	1–0	(Argentina) Banfield
Ergas 61'	Report

Estadio Centenario, Montevideo (Note: Boston River played their home match at Estadio Centenario, Montevideo, instead of their regular stadium Estadio Parque Artigas, Las Piedras.)
Referee: Andrés Rojas (Colombia)

1 August 2018
21:45 UTC−3

Banfield (Argentina)	2–0	(Uruguay) Boston River
Bertolo 50', 66' (pen.)	Report

Estadio Florencio Sola, Banfield
Referee: Víctor Carrillo (Peru)

Banfield won 2–1 on aggregate and advanced to the round of 16 (Match E).

=== Match O6 ===
2 August 2018
21:45 UTC−3

Fluminense (Brazil)	2–0	(Uruguay) Defensor Sporting
Digão 86'; Sornoza 90+2'	Report

Estádio do Maracanã, Rio de Janeiro
Attendance: 14,895
Referee: Germán Delfino (Argentina)

16 August 2018
21:45 UTC−3

Defensor Sporting (Uruguay)	0–1	(Brazil) Fluminense
	Report	Pedro 77'

Estadio Luis Franzini, Montevideo
Referee: Roberto Tobar (Chile)

Fluminense won 3–0 on aggregate and advanced to the round of 16 (Match F).

=== Match O7 ===
26 July 2018
19:30 UTC−3

Atlético Paranaense (Brazil)	2–0	(Uruguay) Peñarol
Marcelo Cirino 59'; Pablo 79'	Report

Arena da Baixada, Curitiba
Referee: Fernando Rapallini (Argentina)

7 August 2018
19:30 UTC−3

Peñarol (Uruguay)	1–4	(Brazil) Atlético Paranaense
Cr. Rodríguez 61'	Report	Léo Pereira 6'; Marcinho 51'; Nikão 67'; Bruno Guimarães 90+1'

Estadio Campeón del Siglo, Montevideo
Referee: Mauro Vigliano (Argentina)

Atlético Paranaense won 6–1 on aggregate and advanced to the round of 16 (Match G).

=== Match O8 ===
18 July 2018
19:45 UTC−5

Deportivo Cali (Colombia)	4–0	(Bolivia) Bolívar
Mosquera 30'; Benedetti 49'; Sand 62'; Cabrera 90+1'	Report

Estadio Deportivo Cali, Palmira
Referee: Fernando Espinoza (Argentina)

2 August 2018
20:45 UTC−4

Bolívar (Bolivia)	1–2	(Colombia) Deportivo Cali
Callejón 80'	Report	Murillo 72'; Benedetti 87' (pen.)

Estadio Hernando Siles, La Paz
Referee: Ulises Mereles (Paraguay)

Deportivo Cali won 6–1 on aggregate and advanced to the round of 16 (Match H).

=== Match O9 ===
25 July 2018
17:30 UTC−5

LDU Quito (Ecuador)	3–1	(Brazil) Vasco da Gama
Anangonó 7', 87'; J. Julio 20'	Report	Thiago Galhardo 53' (pen.)

Estadio Rodrigo Paz Delgado, Quito
Referee: Juan Soto (Venezuela)

9 August 2018
19:30 UTC−3

Vasco da Gama (Brazil)	1–0	(Ecuador) LDU Quito
Thiago Galhardo 85'	Report

Estádio São Januário, Rio de Janeiro
Attendance: 18,943
Referee: Mario Díaz de Vivar (Paraguay)

LDU Quito won 3–2 on aggregate and advanced to the round of 16 (Match H).

=== Match O10 ===
17 July 2018
18:30 UTC−4

Caracas (Venezuela)	2–0	(Peru) Sport Huancayo
Díaz 6'; Martins 81' (pen.)	Report

Estadio Metropolitano de Cabudare, Cabudare (Note: Caracas played their home match at Estadio Metropolitano de Cabudare, Cabudare, instead of their regular stadium Estadio Olímpico de la UCV, Caracas.)
Referee: Ivo Méndez (Bolivia)

24 July 2018
17:30 UTC−5

Sport Huancayo (Peru)	3–4	(Venezuela) Caracas
Salinas 13'; Valverde 41'; Sauñe 86'	Report	Díaz 27', 46', 68'; Aristeguieta 90'

Estadio Huancayo, Huancayo
Referee: Nicolás Gallo (Colombia)

Caracas won 6–3 on aggregate and advanced to the round of 16 (Match G).

=== Match O11 ===
19 July 2018
17:30 UTC−5

Deportivo Cuenca (Ecuador)	2–2	(Bolivia) Jorge Wilstermann
De la Cruz 20'; Rojas 41'	Report	Lucas Gaúcho 71' (pen.); Álvarez 77'

Estadio Alejandro Serrano Aguilar, Cuenca
Referee: Esteban Ostojich (Uruguay)

31 July 2018
18:30 UTC−4

Jorge Wilstermann (Bolivia)	2–2	(Ecuador) Deportivo Cuenca
Álvarez 17'; Saucedo 54'	Report	Preciado 2' (pen.); Pita 79'
Penalties
Saucedo (penalty missed); Melgar (penalty scored); Serginho (penalty scored); Lucas Gaúcho (penalty scored); Álvarez (penalty missed); Ortiz (penalty scored); Giménez (penalty scored); Meleán (penalty missed)	5–6	(penalty missed) Bonfigli; (penalty missed) Mosquera; (penalty scored) Pita; (penalty scored) Martínez; (penalty scored) Preciado; (penalty scored) Araujo; (penalty scored) Bedoya; (penalty scored) Carabalí

Estadio Félix Capriles, Cochabamba
Referee: Alexis Herrera (Venezuela)

Tied 4–4 on aggregate, Deportivo Cuenca won on penalties and advanced to the round of 16 (Match F).

=== Match O12 ===
18 July 2018
19:30 UTC−3

Defensa y Justicia (Argentina)	2–0	(Ecuador) El Nacional
Fernández 72'; Almeida 76'	Report

Estadio Norberto Tomaghello, Gobernador Costa
Referee: Piero Maza (Chile)

31 July 2018
17:30 UTC−5

El Nacional (Ecuador)	1–0	(Argentina) Defensa y Justicia
Angulo 19'	Report

Estadio Olímpico Atahualpa, Quito
Referee: Éber Aquino (Paraguay)

Defensa y Justicia won 2–1 on aggregate and advanced to the round of 16 (Match E).

=== Match O13 ===
17 July 2018
21:45 UTC−3

Lanús (Argentina)	1–0	(Colombia) Junior
García Guerreño 23'	Report

Estadio Ciudad de Lanús, Lanús
Referee: Arnaldo Samaniego (Paraguay)

24 July 2018
19:45 UTC−5

Junior (Colombia)	1–0	(Argentina) Lanús
Díaz 80'	Report
Penalties
T. Gutiérrez (penalty missed); Barrera (penalty scored); Díaz (penalty missed); Pérez (penalty scored); Viera (penalty scored)	3–2	(penalty missed) Pasquini; (penalty missed) Andrada; (penalty scored) Maciel; (penalty scored) Martínez; (penalty missed) Belmonte

Estadio Metropolitano Roberto Meléndez, Barranquilla
Referee: Wilton Sampaio (Brazil)

Tied 1–1 on aggregate, Junior won on penalties and advanced to the round of 16 (Match D).

=== Match O14 ===
26 July 2018
21:45 UTC−3

San Lorenzo (Argentina)	3–0 Awarded	(Chile) Deportes Temuco
Blandi 62'	Report	Riquero 69', 83'

Estadio Pedro Bidegain, Buenos Aires
Referee: Rodolpho Toski (Brazil)

15 August 2018
19:30 UTC−3

Deportes Temuco (Chile)	1–0	(Argentina) San Lorenzo
Donoso 90+2'	Report

Estadio Municipal Germán Becker, Temuco
Attendance: 15,324
Referee: Carlos Orbe (Ecuador)

San Lorenzo won 3–1 on aggregate and advanced to the round of 16 (Match C).

=== Match O15 ===
25 July 2018
21:45 UTC−3

Bahia (Brazil)	2–0	(Uruguay) Cerro
Gilberto 53'; Régis 73' (pen.)	Report

Estádio de Pituaçu, Salvador (Note: Bahia played their home match at Estádio de Pituaçu, Salvador, instead of their regular stadium Arena Fonte Nova, Salvador.)
Attendance: 11,932
Referee: Michael Espinoza (Peru)

8 August 2018
21:45 UTC−3

Cerro (Uruguay)	1–1	(Brazil) Bahia
Paiva 61'	Report	Zé Rafael 17'

Estadio Luis Tróccoli, Montevideo
Referee: José Argote (Venezuela)

Bahia won 3–1 on aggregate and advanced to the round of 16 (Match B).

=== Match O16 ===
19 July 2018
21:45 UTC−3

Rampla Juniors (Uruguay)	0–0	(Colombia) Santa Fe
	Report

Estadio Luis Franzini, Montevideo (Note: Rampla Juniors played their home match at Estadio Luis Franzini, Montevideo, instead of their regular stadium Estadio Olímpico, Montevideo.)
Referee: Omar Ponce (Ecuador)

31 July 2018
19:45 UTC−5

Santa Fe (Colombia)	2–0	(Uruguay) Rampla Juniors
Henao 54', 82'	Report

Estadio El Campín, Bogotá
Referee: Diego Haro (Peru)

Santa Fe won 2–0 on aggregate and advanced to the round of 16 (Match A).
