= 2016–17 Liga de Fútbol Profesional Boliviano =

Liga de Fútbol Profesional Boliviano
- Season: 2016–17
- Dates: 12 August 2016 – 27 December 2017
- Champions: 2016 Apertura: The Strongest (15th title); 2017 Apertura: Bolívar (27th title); 2017 Clausura: Bolívar (28th title)
- Relegated: Petrolero
- Copa Libertadores: The Strongest; Bolívar; Jorge Wilstermann; Oriente Petrolero
- Copa Sudamericana: Blooming; Guabirá; San José; Nacional Potosí
- Matches: 398
- Goals: 1,257 (3.16 per match)
- Top goalscorer: 2016 Apertura: Cristian Alessandrini and Juanmi Callejón (14 goals each); 2017 Apertura: Carlos Saucedo (17 goals); 2017 Clausura: Gilbert Álvarez (15 goals)
- Biggest home win: Bolívar 6–0 Guabirá (18 September 2016); The Strongest 6–0 Blooming (14 April 2017); The Strongest 6–0 Real Potosí (10 December 2017)
- Biggest away win: Universitario 1–6 Nacional Potosí (29 September 2016)
- Highest scoring: The Strongest 7–2 Nacional Potosí (12 December 2016); The Strongest 7–2 San José (21 December 2016)

The 2016–17 Liga de Fútbol Profesional Boliviano season was the 40th season of Bolivia's top-flight football league and the last season under the LFPB name. This season comprised three tournaments (Apertura 2016, Apertura 2017 and Clausura 2017) after an agreement was reached between LFPB and ANF (Second Division) to change the calendar to a single calendar year following the reforms implemented for the Copa Libertadores and Copa Sudamericana by CONMEBOL ahead of the 2017 season.

== Teams ==
The number of teams for 2016–17 remained the same as last season. Ciclón was relegated to the Liga Nacional B (Second Division). They were replaced by the 2015–16 Liga Nacional B champion Guabirá.

Locations of the 2016–17 LFPB teams

Team	Home city	Home stadium
Blooming	Santa Cruz	Ramón Tahuichi Aguilera
Bolívar	La Paz	Hernando Siles
Guabirá	Montero	Gilberto Parada
Jorge Wilstermann	Cochabamba	Félix Capriles
Nacional Potosí	Potosí	Víctor Agustín Ugarte
Oriente Petrolero	Santa Cruz	Ramón Tahuichi Aguilera
Petrolero	Yacuiba	Federico Ibarra; Provincial de Yacuiba
Real Potosí	Potosí	Víctor Agustín Ugarte
San José	Oruro	Jesús Bermúdez
Sport Boys	Warnes	Samuel Vaca
The Strongest	La Paz	Hernando Siles
Universitario de Sucre	Sucre	Olímpico Patria

== Torneo Apertura 2016 ==
=== Standings ===
Pos	Team	Pld	W	D	L	GF	GA	GD	Pts	Qualification
1	The Strongest (C)	22	14	7	1	44	12	+32	49	Qualification to Championship playoff
2	Bolívar	22	15	4	3	46	21	+25	49	Qualification to Championship playoff
3	Oriente Petrolero	22	10	4	8	25	31	−6	34	
4	Real Potosí	22	9	4	9	33	30	+3	31	
5	Blooming	22	8	5	9	24	25	−1	29	
6	Jorge Wilstermann	22	8	5	9	28	34	−6	29	
7	Nacional Potosí	22	8	4	10	41	47	−6	28	
8	Sport Boys	22	6	8	8	27	31	−4	26	
9	Universitario de Sucre	22	6	7	9	27	37	−10	25	
10	San José	22	7	3	12	29	42	−13	24	
11	Petrolero	22	6	5	11	20	19	+1	23	
12	Guabirá	22	6	2	14	27	42	−15	20	

Source: Soccerway
Rules for classification: 1) Points, 2) Playoff game, in case two teams are tied in points for first place.
If there are more than two teams tied in points: 2) Goal difference, 3) Goals for, 4) Away goals for, 5) Drawing of lots.
(C) Champions

=== Results ===
Home \ Away	BLO	BOL	GUA	WIL	NAC	OPE	CPE	RPO	SJO	SBO	STR	UNI
Blooming		0–1	3–1	1–1	2–1	3–0	0–1	1–0	3–0	0–0	0–0	0–0
Bolívar	3–0		6–0	2–1	4–2	0–1	2–1	2–0	2–1	2–1	2–1	4–2
Guabirá	0–4	1–2		2–2	2–1	1–2	1–0	3–0	5–2	1–2	0–3	3–0
Jorge Wilstermann	1–2	0–0	1–1		2–0	2–1	2–0	3–2	3–1	2–1	0–3	2–2
Nacional Potosí	2–1	1–4	2–1	3–1		4–0	2–2	1–1	3–2	3–1	0–0	3–0
Oriente Petrolero	3–1	1–1	1–0	0–1	1–0		1–0	3–0	3–1	2–1	1–1	1–1
Petrolero	0–0	0–1	1–0	5–0	5–0	0–1		1–1	2–1	0–0	0–1	1–0
Real Potosí	5–1	2–1	3–1	4–0	3–1	4–1	2–0		2–1	2–0	0–2	1–2
San José	1–0	0–2	3–0	1–0	2–2	2–0	2–1	1–0		2–2	0–1	1–1
Sport Boys	0–2	3–2	1–0	1–0	5–2	2–2	0–0	1–1	3–1		2–2	0–0
The Strongest	3–0	1–1	2–1	1–0	7–2	2–0	1–0	0–0	7–2	3–0		2–0
Universitario de Sucre	2–0	2–2	1–3	1–4	1–6	4–0	1–0	4–0	0–2	2–1	1–1	

Updated to match(es) played on 21 December 2016. Source: Soccerway
Legend: Blue = home team win; Yellow = draw; Red = away team win.

=== Championship playoff ===
Since The Strongest and Bolívar ended up tied in points, a playoff was played to decide the champion.

24 December 2016
12:00

The Strongest	2–1	Bolívar
Pedrozo 31'; Escobar 74'	Report	Callejón 88'

Estadio Hernando Siles, La Paz
Referee: Gery Vargas

Liga de Fútbol Profesional Boliviano
2016 Torneo Apertura champions

=== Top goalscorers ===
Rank	Name	Club	Goals
1	(Argentina) Cristian Alessandrini	Nacional Potosí	14
1	(Spain) Juanmi Callejón	Bolívar	14
3	(Bolivia) José Alfredo Castillo	Guabirá	13
4	(Bolivia) Pablo Escobar	The Strongest	12
4	(Bolivia) José Ríos	San José	12

Source: Soccerway

== Torneo Apertura 2017 ==
=== Standings ===
Pos	Team	Pld	W	D	L	GF	GA	GD	Pts	Qualification
1	Bolívar (C)	22	16	2	4	59	16	+43	50	Qualification to Copa Libertadores group stage
2	The Strongest	22	13	2	7	47	31	+16	41	
3	Guabirá	22	12	3	7	44	31	+13	39	
4	Oriente Petrolero	22	11	4	7	40	31	+9	37	
5	Blooming	22	11	1	10	39	50	−11	34	
6	Nacional Potosí	22	10	3	9	37	35	+2	33	
7	San José	22	7	7	8	33	32	+1	28	
8	Sport Boys	22	8	4	10	41	50	−9	28	
9	Real Potosí	22	8	1	13	30	50	−20	25	
10	Jorge Wilstermann	22	6	5	11	26	34	−8	23	
11	Petrolero	22	5	5	12	36	51	−15	20	
12	Universitario de Sucre	22	5	3	14	21	42	−21	18	

Source: Soccerway
Rules for classification: 1) Points, 2) Playoff game, in case two teams are tied in points for first place.
If there are more than two teams tied in points: 2) Goal difference, 3) Goals for, 4) Away goals for, 5) Drawing of lots.
(C) Champions

=== Results ===
Home \ Away	BLO	BOL	GUA	WIL	NAC	OPE	CPE	RPO	SJO	SBO	STR	UNI
Blooming		0–3	3–2	3–2	2–0	0–3	2–0	3–1	3–3	1–3	4–1	4–2
Bolívar	5–0		2–0	2–0	3–1	1–0	3–0	4–0	3–1	5–0	3–1	5–0
Guabirá	2–0	2–1		0–0	3–1	2–1	5–1	3–1	2–0	3–1	3–0	5–1
Jorge Wilstermann	3–1	1–0	2–3		3–2	5–1	1–3	1–0	1–2	3–1	1–1	1–1
Nacional Potosí	1–0	0–3	2–1	0–0		3–1	4–1	3–0	1–1	5–2	0–1	1–0
Oriente Petrolero	2–3	1–1	3–1	2–0	4–1		0–2	3–1	4–1	1–1	3–1	1–0
Petrolero	2–4	2–2	1–3	2–0	2–2	2–2		5–0	2–0	2–2	0–1	2–2
Real Potosí	3–1	2–1	2–0	4–0	1–2	3–2	4–3		1–1	2–3	1–3	1–0
San José	3–0	1–4	4–0	0–0	2–1	0–0	4–1	3–0		3–1	0–1	3–3
Sport Boys	3–4	3–2	1–1	3–1	1–3	3–4	2–1	3–0	0–0		0–1	5–2
The Strongest	6–0	1–4	3–3	2–1	3–2	0–1	5–1	6–1	3–1	5–0		1–0
Universitario de Sucre	0–1	0–2	1–0	1–0	1–2	0–1	3–1	0–2	1–0	1–3	2–1	

Updated to match(es) played on 29 June 2017. Source: Soccerway
Legend: Blue = home team win; Yellow = draw; Red = away team win.

Liga de Fútbol Profesional Boliviano
2017 Torneo Apertura champions

=== Top goalscorers ===
Rank	Name	Club	Goals
1	(Bolivia) Carlos Saucedo	Guabirá	17
2	(Argentina) Enzo Maidana	Petrolero	16
2	(Argentina) Juan Vogliotti	Sport Boys	16
4	(Bolivia) Pablo Escobar	The Strongest	14
4	(Argentina) César Pereyra	Blooming	14
6	(Argentina) Cristian Alessandrini	Nacional Potosí	12
6	(Uruguay) Gastón Sirino	Bolívar	12
8	(Venezuela) José Alí Meza	Oriente Petrolero	11
9	(Colombia) Jair Reinoso	San José	10
9	(Argentina) Antonio Rojano	Real Potosí	10

Source: Soccerway

=== Attendances ===
#	Football club	Home games	Average attendance
1	Club Bolívar	11	13,901
2	The Strongest	11	10,924
3	Jorge Wilstermann	11	9,273
4	Oriente Petrolero	11	7,818
5	Club Blooming	11	7,727
6	Club San José	11	7,688
7	Universitario de Sucre	11	5,818
8	Guabirá	11	5,182
9	Real Potosí	11	4,295
10	Club Petrolero	11	3,909
11	Sport Boys Warnes	11	3,091
12	Nacional Potosí	11	2,834

== Torneo Clausura 2017 ==
=== Standings ===
Pos	Team	Pld	W	D	L	GF	GA	GD	Pts	Qualification
1	Bolívar (Note: Bolívar were awarded two points due to a breach of rules by Jorge Wilstermann during the Torneo Clausura match between both teams.) (C)	22	12	6	4	35	26	+9	44	
2	The Strongest	22	12	4	6	42	24	+18	40	
3	Jorge Wilstermann (Note: Jorge Wilstermann were deducted three points as punishment for a breach of rules regarding foreign players on field during their Torneo Clausura match against Bolívar.)	22	12	4	6	38	23	+15	37	Qualification to Copa Libertadores second stage (Note: Jorge Wilstermann qualified for the Copa Libertadores second stage as Torneo Clausura third-placed team since champions Bolívar and runners-up The Strongest had already qualified for the competition.)
4	San José	22	10	3	9	31	26	+5	33	
5	Blooming	22	7	11	4	24	16	+8	32	
6	Oriente Petrolero	22	7	7	8	28	30	−2	28	
7	Guabirá	22	8	4	10	29	32	−3	28	
8	Petrolero	22	6	8	8	24	23	+1	26	
9	Universitario de Sucre	22	7	5	10	26	34	−8	26	
10	Real Potosí	22	7	4	11	21	36	−15	25	
11	Sport Boys	22	6	5	11	24	41	−17	23	
12	Nacional Potosí	22	6	3	13	25	36	−11	21	

Source: Soccerway
Rules for classification: 1) Points, 2) Playoff game, in case two teams are tied in points for first place.
If there are more than two teams tied in points: 2) Goal difference, 3) Goals for, 4) Away goals for, 5) Drawing of lots.
(C) Champions

=== Results ===
Home \ Away	BLO	BOL	GUA	WIL	NAC	OPE	CPE	RPO	SJO	SBO	STR	UNI
Blooming		1–2	2–2	1–0	4–2	2–2	1–0	0–0	2–0	2–0	0–0	4–0
Bolívar	2–0		3–0	1–1	3–1	1–1	2–0	1–0	2–1	2–0	0–0	1–2
Guabirá	0–0	3–0		0–1	4–0	1–0	2–1	3–0	3–1	0–2	2–0	2–1
Jorge Wilstermann	0–0	2–2	3–0		2–1	2–0	1–1	2–0	1–0	3–1	1–2	3–0
Nacional Potosí	0–0	1–1	2–1	2–0		0–0	2–0	0–1	3–1	3–2	1–2	2–3
Oriente Petrolero	0–0	5–1	3–1	2–1	2–0		2–2	3–1	1–2	2–3	1–1	1–0
Petrolero	1–1	2–0	4–3	1–3	0–1	3–0		0–0	1–0	0–0	0–1	2–0
Real Potosí	2–0	2–3	2–0	2–5	2–1	1–0	1–1		1–2	2–1	1–2	1–1
San José	1–1	1–1	2–0	3–1	1–0	1–2	1–0	3–0		1–2	4–0	4–3
Sport Boys	1–1	1–3	1–1	1–0	3–2	1–1	1–4	0–1	1–0		1–5	1–1
The Strongest	1–0	1–2	3–0	1–2	2–1	5–0	1–1	6–0	1–2	5–1		3–2
Universitario de Sucre	0–2	1–2	1–1	2–4	2–0	1–0	0–0	2–1	0–0	2–0	2–0	

Updated to match(es) played on 17 December 2017. Source: Soccerway
Legend: Blue = home team win; Yellow = draw; Red = away team win.

Liga de Fútbol Profesional Boliviano
2017 Torneo Clausura champions

=== Top goalscorers ===
Rank	Name	Club	Goals
1	(Bolivia) Gilbert Álvarez	Jorge Wilstermann	15
2	(Bolivia) Carlos Saucedo	San José	13
3	(Brazil) Dionatan Machado	Universitario de Sucre	11
4	(Bolivia) José Alfredo Castillo	Guabirá	9
4	(Venezuela) José Alí Meza	Oriente Petrolero	9
6	(Argentina) Cristian Alessandrini	Nacional Potosí	8
6	(Bolivia) Juan Carlos Arce	Bolívar	8
6	(Bolivia) Vladimir Castellón	Real Potosí	8
6	(Bolivia) Rodrigo Vargas	Petrolero	8

Source: Soccerway

== Aggregate table ==
Pos	Team	Pld	W	D	L	GF	GA	GD	Pts	Qualification
1	Bolívar (Note: Bolívar were awarded two points due to a breach of rules by Jorge Wilstermann during the Torneo Clausura match between both teams.) (C)	66	43	12	11	140	63	+77	143	Qualification to Copa Libertadores group stage
2	The Strongest (C)	66	39	13	14	133	67	+66	130	Qualification to Copa Libertadores group stage
3	Oriente Petrolero	66	28	15	23	93	92	+1	99	Qualification to Copa Libertadores first stage
4	Blooming	66	26	17	23	87	91	−4	95	Qualification to Copa Sudamericana first stage
5	Jorge Wilstermann (Note: Jorge Wilstermann were deducted three points as punishment for a breach of rules regarding foreign players on field during their Torneo Clausura match against Bolívar.)	66	26	14	26	92	91	+1	89	Qualification to Copa Libertadores second stage
6	Guabirá	66	26	9	31	100	105	−5	87	Qualification to Copa Sudamericana first stage
7	San José	66	24	13	29	93	100	−7	85	Qualification to Copa Sudamericana first stage
8	Nacional Potosí	66	24	10	32	103	118	−15	82	Qualification to Copa Sudamericana first stage
9	Real Potosí	66	24	9	33	84	116	−32	81	
10	Sport Boys	66	20	17	29	92	122	−30	77	
11	Petrolero	66	17	18	31	80	93	−13	69	Qualification to Aggregate table playoff decider
12	Universitario de Sucre	66	18	15	33	74	113	−39	69	Qualification to Aggregate table playoff decider

Source: Boliviagol
Rules for classification: 1) Points, 2) Playoff game, if needed to decide teams for relegation.
If there are more than two teams tied in points: 2) Goal difference, 3) Goals for, 4) Away goals for, 5) Drawing of lots.
(C) Champions

=== Aggregate table playoff decider ===
Since Petrolero and Universitario ended the season tied in points, a match on neutral ground was played to determine the team that played the promotion/relegation playoff. The loser qualified for the promotion/relegation playoff.

20 December 2017
17:00 UTC–4

Universitario de Sucre	1–0	Petrolero
Andia 25'	Report

Estadio Capitán José Angulo, Sacaba
Referee: Gery Vargas

== Relegation/promotion playoff ==
The relegation playoff was played between:

- Petrolero (2016–17 Primera División aggregate table 12th place)
- Destroyers (2016–17 Liga Nacional B runners-up)

The winner played in the top flight for the 2018 season.

23 December 2017
15:30 UTC–4

Petrolero	0–3	Destroyers
	Report	Cayo Ulloa 63', 70'; Cuéllar 90+5'

Estadio Federico Ibarra, Yacuiba
Referee: Oscar Maldonado

27 December 2017
20:00 UTC–4

Destroyers	1–1	Petrolero
Cuéllar 76'	Report	Robles 40'

Estadio Ramón Tahuichi Aguilera, Santa Cruz de la Sierra
Referee: Luis Yrusta

Destroyers won on points (4–1) and was promoted to the Primera División.
