= 2018 Copa Sudamericana =

Copa CONMEBOL Sudamericana 2018

Tournament details
- Dates: 13 February – 12 December 2018
- Teams: 44+10 (from 10 associations)

Final positions
- Champions: (Brazil) Atlético Paranaense (1st title)
- Runners-up: (Colombia) Junior

Tournament statistics
- Matches played: 106
- Goals scored: 226 (2.13 per match)
- Top scorer(s): (Colombia) Nicolás Benedetti (Brazil) Pablo (5 goals each)

The 2018 Copa CONMEBOL Sudamericana was the 17th edition of the CONMEBOL Sudamericana (also referred to as the Copa Sudamericana, or Portuguese: Copa Sul-Americana), South America's secondary club football tournament organized by CONMEBOL.

Brazilian club Atlético Paranaense defeated Colombian club Junior by 4–3 on penalties in the finals after a 2–2 draw on aggregate score to win their first tournament title. As champions, Atlético Paranaense earned the right to play against the winners of the 2018 Copa Libertadores in the 2019 Recopa Sudamericana, and the winners of the 2018 J.League Cup in the 2019 J.League Cup / Copa Sudamericana Championship. They also automatically qualified for the 2019 Copa Libertadores group stage. Independiente were the defending champions, but did not play in this edition as they qualified for the 2018 Copa Libertadores group stage as Copa Sudamericana champions and later advanced to the knockout stage.

== Teams ==
The following 44 teams from the 10 CONMEBOL associations qualified for the tournament, entering the first stage:

- Argentina and Brazil: 6 berths each
- All other associations: 4 berths each

Association	Team (Berth)	Qualification method
Argentina (6 berths)	San Lorenzo (Argentina 1)	2016–17 Primera División best team not qualified for 2018 Copa Libertadores
Argentina (6 berths)	Lanús (Argentina 2)	2016–17 Primera División 2nd best team not qualified for 2018 Copa Libertadores
Argentina (6 berths)	Newell's Old Boys (Argentina 3)	2016–17 Primera División 3rd best team not qualified for 2018 Copa Libertadores
Argentina (6 berths)	Defensa y Justicia (Argentina 4)	2016–17 Primera División 4th best team not qualified for 2018 Copa Libertadores
Argentina (6 berths)	Colón (Argentina 5)	2016–17 Primera División 5th best team not qualified for 2018 Copa Libertadores
Argentina (6 berths)	Rosario Central (Argentina 6)	2016–17 Primera División 6th best team not qualified for 2018 Copa Libertadores
Bolivia (4 berths)	Blooming (Bolivia 1)	2016–17 Primera División aggregate table best team not qualified for 2018 Copa Libertadores
Bolivia (4 berths)	Guabirá (Bolivia 2)	2016–17 Primera División aggregate table 2nd best team not qualified for 2018 Copa Libertadores
Bolivia (4 berths)	San José (Bolivia 3)	2016–17 Primera División aggregate table 3rd best team not qualified for 2018 Copa Libertadores
Bolivia (4 berths)	Nacional Potosí (Bolivia 4)	2016–17 Primera División aggregate table 4th best team not qualified for 2018 Copa Libertadores
Brazil (6 berths)	Atlético Mineiro (Brazil 1)	2017 Campeonato Brasileiro Série A best team not qualified for 2018 Copa Libertadores
Brazil (6 berths)	Botafogo (Brazil 2)	2017 Campeonato Brasileiro Série A 2nd best team not qualified for 2018 Copa Libertadores
Brazil (6 berths)	Atlético Paranaense (Brazil 3)	2017 Campeonato Brasileiro Série A 3rd best team not qualified for 2018 Copa Libertadores
Brazil (6 berths)	Bahia (Brazil 4)	2017 Campeonato Brasileiro Série A 4th best team not qualified for 2018 Copa Libertadores
Brazil (6 berths)	São Paulo (Brazil 5)	2017 Campeonato Brasileiro Série A 5th best team not qualified for 2018 Copa Libertadores
Brazil (6 berths)	Fluminense (Brazil 6)	2017 Campeonato Brasileiro Série A 6th best team not qualified for 2018 Copa Libertadores
Chile (4 berths)	Unión Española (Chile 1)	2017 Primera División runners-up playoff losers
Chile (4 berths)	Everton (Chile 2)	2017 Transición best team not qualified for 2018 Copa Libertadores
Chile (4 berths)	Audax Italiano (Chile 3)	2017 Transición 2nd best team not qualified for 2018 Copa Libertadores
Chile (4 berths)	Deportes Temuco (Chile 4)	2017 Transición 3rd best team not qualified for 2018 Copa Libertadores
Colombia (4 berths)	Independiente Medellín (Colombia 1)	2017 Primera A aggregate table best team not qualified for 2018 Copa Libertadores
Colombia (4 berths)	América de Cali (Colombia 2)	2017 Primera A aggregate table 2nd best team not qualified for 2018 Copa Libertadores
Colombia (4 berths)	Deportivo Cali (Colombia 3)	2017 Primera A aggregate table 3rd best team not qualified for 2018 Copa Libertadores
Colombia (4 berths)	Jaguares (Colombia 4)	2017 Primera A aggregate table 4th best team not qualified for 2018 Copa Libertadores
Ecuador (4 berths)	Barcelona (Ecuador 1)	2017 Serie A aggregate table best team not qualified for 2018 Copa Libertadores
Ecuador (4 berths)	El Nacional (Ecuador 2)	2017 Serie A aggregate table 2nd best team not qualified for 2018 Copa Libertadores
Ecuador (4 berths)	Deportivo Cuenca (Ecuador 3)	2017 Serie A aggregate table 3rd best team not qualified for 2018 Copa Libertadores
Ecuador (4 berths)	LDU Quito (Ecuador 4)	2017 Serie A Copa Sudamericana playoff winners
Paraguay (4 berths)	Sol de América (Paraguay 1)	2017 Primera División aggregate table best team not qualified for 2018 Copa Libertadores
Paraguay (4 berths)	General Díaz (Paraguay 2)	2017 Primera División aggregate table 2nd best team not qualified for 2018 Copa Libertadores
Paraguay (4 berths)	Sportivo Luqueño (Paraguay 3)	2017 Primera División aggregate table 3rd best team not qualified for 2018 Copa Libertadores
Paraguay (4 berths)	Nacional (Paraguay 4)	2017 Primera División aggregate table 4th best team not qualified for 2018 Copa Libertadores
Peru (4 berths)	UTC (Peru 1)	2017 Descentralizado aggregate table best team not qualified for 2018 Copa Libertadores
Peru (4 berths)	Sport Huancayo (Peru 2)	2017 Descentralizado aggregate table 2nd best team not qualified for 2018 Copa Libertadores
Peru (4 berths)	Sport Rosario (Peru 3)	2017 Descentralizado aggregate table 3rd best team not qualified for 2018 Copa Libertadores
Peru (4 berths)	Sporting Cristal (Peru 4)	2017 Descentralizado aggregate table 4th best team not qualified for 2018 Copa Libertadores
Uruguay (4 berths)	Cerro (Uruguay 1)	2017 Primera División aggregate table best team not qualified for 2018 Copa Libertadores
Uruguay (4 berths)	Boston River (Uruguay 2)	2017 Primera División aggregate table 2nd best team not qualified for 2018 Copa Libertadores
Uruguay (4 berths)	Rampla Juniors (Uruguay 3)	2017 Primera División aggregate table 3rd best team not qualified for 2018 Copa Libertadores
Uruguay (4 berths)	Danubio (Uruguay 4)	2017 Primera División aggregate table 4th best team not qualified for 2018 Copa Libertadores
Venezuela (4 berths)	Mineros de Guayana (Venezuela 1)	2017 Copa Venezuela champions
Venezuela (4 berths)	Estudiantes de Mérida (Venezuela 2)	2017 Clausura classification table best team not qualified for 2018 Copa Libertadores
Venezuela (4 berths)	Caracas (Venezuela 3)	2017 Apertura runners-up
Venezuela (4 berths)	Zamora (Venezuela 4)	2017 Primera División aggregate table best team not qualified for 2018 Copa Libertadores

A further 10 teams eliminated from the 2018 Copa Libertadores were transferred to the Copa Sudamericana, entering the second stage.

Best teams eliminated in third stage
(Bolivia) Jorge Wilstermann
(Argentina) Banfield
Third-placed teams in group stage
(Uruguay) Defensor Sporting
(Bolivia) Bolívar
(Uruguay) Peñarol
(Colombia) Santa Fe
(Brazil) Vasco da Gama
(Uruguay) Nacional
(Colombia) Millonarios
(Colombia) Junior

== Schedule ==
The schedule of the competition was as follows.

Stage	Draw date	First leg	Second leg
First stage	20 December 2017 (Luque, Paraguay)	13–15 & 20–22 February 2018; 10–12 & 18 April 2018	6–8 March 2018; 8–10 & 23 May 2018
Second stage	4 June 2018 (Luque, Paraguay)	17–19, 25–26 July 2018; 1–2 August 2018	24 & 31 July 2018; 1–2, 7–9 & 14–16 August 2018
Round of 16	4 June 2018 (Luque, Paraguay)	Week 1: 21–23 August 2018; Week 2: 18–20 September 2018; Week 3: 25–27 September 2018; Week 4: 2–4 October 2018	
Quarterfinals	4 June 2018 (Luque, Paraguay)	23–25 October 2018	30 October – 1 November 2018
Semifinals	4 June 2018 (Luque, Paraguay)	7–8 November 2018	28–29 November 2018
Finals	4 June 2018 (Luque, Paraguay)	5 December 2018	12 December 2018

== Draws ==
Location of teams of the 2018 Copa Sudamericana.
(L) Teams transferred from the 2018 Copa Libertadores

The draw for the first stage was held on 20 December 2017, 20:00 PYST (UTC−3), at the CONMEBOL Convention Centre in Luque, Paraguay. For the first stage, the teams were divided into two pots according to their geographical zones:

- Pot A (South Zone): 22 teams from Argentina, Bolivia, Chile, Paraguay, and Uruguay
- Pot B (North Zone): 22 teams from Brazil, Colombia, Ecuador, Peru, and Venezuela

The 44 teams were drawn into 22 ties (E1–E22) between a team from Pot A and a team from Pot B, with the teams from Pot B hosting the second leg in odd-numbered ties, and the teams from Pot A hosting the second leg in even-numbered ties. This distribution ensured that teams from the same association could not be drawn into the same tie. The draw for the second stage was held on 4 June 2018, 20:00 PYT (UTC−4), at the CONMEBOL Convention Centre in Luque, Paraguay. For the second stage, the teams were allocated to two pots according to their previous results in this season:

- Pot 1: 10 teams transferred from the Copa Libertadores and six best winners of the first stage from the Copa Sudamericana
- Pot 2: 16 remaining winners of the first stage from the Copa Sudamericana

The 32 teams were drawn into 16 ties (O1–O16) between a team from Pot 1 and a team from Pot 2, with the teams from Pot 1 hosting the second leg. Teams from the same association could be drawn into the same tie.

== First stage ==
In the first stage, each tie was played on a home-and-away two-legged basis. If tied on aggregate, the away goals rule would be used. If still tied, extra time would not be played, and the penalty shoot-out would be used to determine the winner (Regulations Article 27).

The 22 winners of the first stage advanced to the second stage to join the 10 teams transferred from the Copa Libertadores (two best teams eliminated in the third stage of qualifying and eight third-placed teams in the group stage).

Team 1	Agg.	Team 2	1st leg	2nd leg
Everton (Chile)	2–2 (a)	(Venezuela) Caracas	1–2	1–0
Estudiantes de Mérida (Venezuela)	1–3	(Chile) Deportes Temuco	1–1	0–2
Lanús (Argentina)	5–4	(Peru) Sporting Cristal	4–2	1–2
Deportivo Cali (Colombia)	5–3	(Uruguay) Danubio	3–0	2–3
San Lorenzo (Argentina)	1–0	(Brazil) Atlético Mineiro	1–0	0–0
LDU Quito (Ecuador)	4–4 (a)	(Bolivia) Guabirá	2–1	2–3
Nacional (Paraguay)	0–0 (4–3 p)	(Venezuela) Mineros de Guayana	0–0	0–0
Sport Rosario (Peru)	0–2	(Uruguay) Cerro	0–0	0–2
Sol de América (Paraguay)	3–3 (a)	(Colombia) Independiente Medellín	2–0	1–3
Barcelona (Ecuador)	1–2	(Paraguay) General Díaz	0–0	1–2
Sportivo Luqueño (Paraguay)	2–2 (5–6 p)	(Ecuador) Deportivo Cuenca	2–0	0–2
UTC (Peru)	2–4	(Uruguay) Rampla Juniors	2–0	0–4
Defensa y Justicia (Argentina)	3–1	(Colombia) América de Cali	0–1	3–0
Atlético Paranaense (Brazil)	4–2	(Argentina) Newell's Old Boys	3–0	1–2
Unión Española (Chile)	0–3	(Peru) Sport Huancayo	0–0	0–3
Jaguares (Colombia)	2–4	(Uruguay) Boston River	2–1	0–3
Rosario Central (Argentina)	0–1	(Brazil) São Paulo	0–0	0–1
El Nacional (Ecuador)	4–3	(Bolivia) San José	3–2	1–1
Blooming (Bolivia)	1–4	(Brazil) Bahia	1–0	0–4
Zamora (Venezuela)	0–3	(Argentina) Colón	0–2	0–1
Audax Italiano (Chile)	2–3	(Brazil) Botafogo	1–2	1–1
Fluminense (Brazil)	3–2	(Bolivia) Nacional Potosí	3–0	0–2

== Second stage ==
In the second stage, each tie was played on a home-and-away two-legged basis. If tied on aggregate, the away goals rule would be used. If still tied, extra time would not be played, and the penalty shoot-out would be used to determine the winner (Regulations Article 27).

The 16 winners of the second stage advanced to the round of 16 of the knockout stages.

Team 1	Agg.	Team 2	1st leg	2nd leg
General Díaz (Paraguay)	1–5	(Colombia) Millonarios	1–1	0–4
Nacional (Paraguay)	2–3	(Brazil) Botafogo	2–1	0–2
Sol de América (Paraguay)	0–1	(Uruguay) Nacional	0–0	0–1
São Paulo (Brazil)	1–1 (3–5 p)	(Argentina) Colón	0–1	1–0
Boston River (Uruguay)	1–2	(Argentina) Banfield	1–0	0–2
Fluminense (Brazil)	3–0	(Uruguay) Defensor Sporting	2–0	1–0
Atlético Paranaense (Brazil)	6–1	(Uruguay) Peñarol	2–0	4–1
Deportivo Cali (Colombia)	6–1	(Bolivia) Bolívar	4–0	2–1
LDU Quito (Ecuador)	3–2	(Brazil) Vasco da Gama	3–1	0–1
Caracas (Venezuela)	6–3	(Peru) Sport Huancayo	2–0	4–3
Deportivo Cuenca (Ecuador)	4–4 (6–5 p)	(Bolivia) Jorge Wilstermann	2–2	2–2
Defensa y Justicia (Argentina)	2–1	(Ecuador) El Nacional	2–0	0–1
Lanús (Argentina)	1–1 (2–3 p)	(Colombia) Junior	1–0	0–1
San Lorenzo (Argentina)	3–1	(Chile) Deportes Temuco	3–0	0–1
Bahia (Brazil)	3–1	(Uruguay) Cerro	2–0	1–1
Rampla Juniors (Uruguay)	0–2	(Colombia) Santa Fe	0–0	0–2

Notes

1. CONMEBOL awarded San Lorenzo a 3–0 win as a result of Deportes Temuco fielding the ineligible player Jonathan Requena. The match originally ended 1–2.

== Final stages ==
Starting from the round of 16, the teams played a single-elimination tournament with the following rules:

- Each tie was played on a home-and-away two-legged basis, with the higher-seeded team hosting the second leg (Regulations Article 22.d).
- In the round of 16, quarterfinals, and semifinals, if tied on aggregate, the away goals rule would be used. If still tied, extra time would not be played, and the penalty shoot-out would be used to determine the winner (Regulations Article 27).
- In the finals, if tied on aggregate, the away goals rule would not be used, and 30 minutes of extra time would be played. If still tied after extra time, the penalty shoot-out would be used to determine the winner (Regulations Article 28).

=== Seeding ===
Starting from the round of 16, the teams were seeded according to the second stage draw, with each team assigned a "seed" 1–16 corresponding to the tie they win (O1–O16) (Regulations Article 22.c).

=== Bracket ===
The bracket was decided based on the second stage draw, which was held on 4 June 2018.

Round of 16
16	(Colombia) Santa Fe (p)	0	0	0 (5)
1	(Colombia) Millonarios	0	0	0 (3)
9	(Ecuador) LDU Quito	1	0	1 (1)
8	(Colombia) Deportivo Cali (p)	0	1	1 (3)
13	(Colombia) Junior	1	1	2
4	(Argentina) Colón	0	1	1
12	(Argentina) Defensa y Justicia	0	2	2
5	(Argentina) Banfield	0	0	0
15	(Brazil) Bahia (p)	2	1	3 (5)
2	(Brazil) Botafogo	1	2	3 (4)
10	(Venezuela) Caracas	0	1	1
7	(Brazil) Atlético Paranaense	2	2	4
11	(Ecuador) Deportivo Cuenca	0	0	0
6	(Brazil) Fluminense	2	2	4
14	(Argentina) San Lorenzo	3	0	3
3	(Uruguay) Nacional (a)	1	2	3

Quarterfinals
16	(Colombia) Santa Fe	1	2	3
8	(Colombia) Deportivo Cali	1	1	2
13	(Colombia) Junior (a)	2	1	3
12	(Argentina) Defensa y Justicia	0	3	3
15	(Brazil) Bahia	0	1	1 (1)
7	(Brazil) Atlético Paranaense (p)	1	0	1 (4)
6	(Brazil) Fluminense	1	1	2
3	(Uruguay) Nacional	1	0	1

Semifinals
16	(Colombia) Santa Fe	0	0	0
13	(Colombia) Junior	2	1	3
7	(Brazil) Atlético Paranaense	2	2	4
6	(Brazil) Fluminense	0	0	0

Finals
13	(Colombia) Junior	1	1	2 (3)
7	(Brazil) Atlético Paranaense (p)	1	1	2 (4)

=== Round of 16 ===
Team 1	Agg.	Team 2	1st leg	2nd leg
Santa Fe (Colombia)	0–0 (5–3 p)	(Colombia) Millonarios	0–0	0–0
Bahia (Brazil)	3–3 (5–4 p)	(Brazil) Botafogo	2–1	1–2
San Lorenzo (Argentina)	3–3 (a)	(Uruguay) Nacional	3–1	0–2
Junior (Colombia)	2–1	(Argentina) Colón	1–0	1–1
Defensa y Justicia (Argentina)	2–0	(Argentina) Banfield	2–0	0–0
Deportivo Cuenca (Ecuador)	0–4	(Brazil) Fluminense	0–2	0–2
Caracas (Venezuela)	1–4	(Brazil) Atlético Paranaense	0–2	1–2
LDU Quito (Ecuador)	1–1 (1–3 p)	(Colombia) Deportivo Cali	1–0	0–1

=== Quarterfinals ===
Team 1	Agg.	Team 2	1st leg	2nd leg
Santa Fe (Colombia)	3–2	(Colombia) Deportivo Cali	1–1	2–1
Bahia (Brazil)	1–1 (1–4 p)	(Brazil) Atlético Paranaense	0–1	1–0
Fluminense (Brazil)	2–1	(Uruguay) Nacional	1–1	1–0
Junior (Colombia)	3–3 (a)	(Argentina) Defensa y Justicia	2–0	1–3

=== Semifinals ===
Team 1	Agg.	Team 2	1st leg	2nd leg
Santa Fe (Colombia)	0–3	(Colombia) Junior	0–2	0–1
Atlético Paranaense (Brazil)	4–0	(Brazil) Fluminense	2–0	2–0

=== Finals ===
5 December 2018
19:45 UTC−5

Junior (Colombia)	1–1	(Brazil) Atlético Paranaense
González 52'	Report	Pablo 50'

Estadio Metropolitano Roberto Meléndez, Barranquilla
Attendance: 38,094
Referee: Diego Haro (Peru)

12 December 2018
21:45 UTC−2

Atlético Paranaense (Brazil)	1–1 (a.e.t.)	(Colombia) Junior
Pablo 26'	Report	T. Gutiérrez 57'
Penalties
Jonathan (penalty scored); Raphael Veiga (penalty scored); Bergson (penalty scored); Renan Lodi (penalty missed); Thiago Heleno (penalty scored)	4–3	(penalty scored) Narváez; (penalty missed) Fuentes; (penalty scored) Pérez; (penalty missed) T. Gutiérrez; (penalty scored) Viera

Arena da Baixada, Curitiba
Attendance: 40,263
Referee: Roberto Tobar (Chile)

Tied 2–2 on aggregate, Atlético Paranaense won on penalties.

== Statistics ==
=== Top scorers ===
Rank	Player	Team	1S1	1S2	2S1	2S2	⅛F1	⅛F2	QF1	QF2	SF1	SF2	F1	F2	Total
1	(Colombia) Nicolás Benedetti	(Colombia) Deportivo Cali	1	1	1	1				1					5
1	(Brazil) Pablo	(Brazil) Atlético Paranaense	1		1				1				1	1	5
3	(Venezuela) Diomar Díaz	(Venezuela) Caracas			1	3									4
3	(Argentina) Nicolás Fernández	(Argentina) Defensa y Justicia		1	1	x				2					4
3	(Brazil) Nikão	(Brazil) Atlético Paranaense	1	1	x	1						1			4
6	(Ecuador) Juan Luis Anangonó	(Ecuador) LDU Quito		1	2			x							3
6	(Colombia) Luis Díaz	(Colombia) Junior				1			1	1					3
6	(Colombia) Teófilo Gutiérrez	(Colombia) Junior									1	1	x	1	3
6	(Argentina) Emanuel Herrera	(Peru) Sporting Cristal	2	1											3
6	(Brazil) Rodrigo Pimpão	(Brazil) Botafogo	1				1	1							3
6	(Argentina) José Sand	(Colombia) Deportivo Cali	1		1			1							3
6	(Brazil) Zé Rafael	(Brazil) Bahia		2		1									3
6	(Uruguay) Matías Zunino	(Uruguay) Nacional				1		1	1						3

Source: CONMEBOL.com

=== Top assists ===
Rank	Player	Team	Assists
1	(Ecuador) Anderson Julio	(Ecuador) LDU Quito	3
1	(Brazil) Pablo	(Brazil) Atlético Paranaense	3
1	(Brazil) Régis	(Brazil) Bahia	3
1	(Brazil) Renan Lodi	(Brazil) Atlético Paranaense	3
1	(Ecuador) Junior Sornoza	(Brazil) Fluminense	3

Source: CONMEBOL.com

== See also ==
- 2018 Copa Libertadores
- 2019 Recopa Sudamericana
- 2019 J.League Cup / Copa Sudamericana Championship
