= 2018 Copa Libertadores qualifying stages =

The 2018 Copa Libertadores qualifying stages were played from 22 January to 22 February 2018. A total of 19 teams competed in the qualifying stages to decide four of the 32 places in the group stage of the 2018 Copa Libertadores.

== Draw ==
The draw for the qualifying stages was held on 20 December 2017, 20:00 PYST (UTC−3), at the CONMEBOL Convention Centre in Luque, Paraguay.

Teams were seeded by their CONMEBOL ranking of the Copa Libertadores (shown in parentheses), taking into account of the following three factors:

1. Performance in the last 10 years, taking into account Copa Libertadores results in the period 2008–2017
2. Historical coefficient, taking into account Copa Libertadores results in the period 1960–2007
3. Local tournament champion, with bonus points awarded to domestic league champions of the last 10 years

For the first stage, the six teams were drawn into three ties (E1–E3), with the seeded teams hosting the second leg.

First stage draw
Seeded	Unseeded
(Paraguay) Olimpia (9); (Peru) Universitario (40); (Venezuela) Deportivo Táchira (46)	(Uruguay) Montevideo Wanderers (70); (Bolivia) Oriente Petrolero (76); (Ecuador) Macará (208)

For the second stage, the 16 teams were drawn into eight ties (C1–C8), with the seeded teams hosting the second leg. Teams from the same association could not be drawn into the same tie, excluding the winners of the first stage, which were unseeded and whose identity was not known at the time of the draw, and could be drawn into the same tie with another team from the same association.

Second stage draw
Seeded	Unseeded
(Uruguay) Nacional (5); (Colombia) Santa Fe (21); (Paraguay) Guaraní (28); (Ecuador) Independiente del Valle (29); (Bolivia) Jorge Wilstermann (43); (Brazil) Vasco da Gama (54); (Colombia) Junior (60); (Peru) Melgar (82)	(Brazil) Chapecoense (89); (Argentina) Banfield (91); (Chile) Santiago Wanderers (126); (Venezuela) Carabobo (161); (Chile) Universidad de Concepción (193); First stage winner E1; First stage winner E2; First stage winner E3

Notes

1. ^{†} The identity of the team Chile 4 was not known at the time of the draw, and was unseeded in the second stage draw.

For the third stage, no draw was made, and the eight teams were allocated into the following four ties (G1–G4), with the second stage winners with the higher CONMEBOL ranking hosting the second leg. As the identity of the winners of the second stage was not known at the time of the draw, they could be drawn into the same tie with another team from the same association.

- Second stage winner C1 vs. Second stage winner C8
- Second stage winner C2 vs. Second stage winner C7
- Second stage winner C3 vs. Second stage winner C6
- Second stage winner C4 vs. Second stage winner C5

== Format ==
In the qualifying stages, each tie was played on a home-and-away two-legged basis. If tied on aggregate, the away goals rule was used. If still tied, extra time was not played, and a penalty shoot-out was used to determine the winner (Regulations Article 29).

== Bracket ==
The qualifying stages were structured as follows:

- First stage (6 teams): The three winners of the first stage advanced to the second stage to join the 13 teams which were given byes to the second stage.
- Second stage (16 teams): The eight winners of the second stage advanced to the third stage.
- Third stage (8 teams): The four winners of the third stage advanced to the group stage to join the 28 direct entrants. The two best teams eliminated in the third stage entered the Copa Sudamericana second stage.

The bracket was decided based on the first stage draw and second stage draw, which were held on 20 December 2017.

=== Winner G1 ===
First stage
(Chile) Santiago Wanderers	Bye
(Peru) Melgar	Bye
(Ecuador) Macará	1	0	1
(Venezuela) Deportivo Táchira (a)	1	0	1
(Colombia) Santa Fe	Bye

Second stage
(Chile) Santiago Wanderers	1	1	2
(Peru) Melgar	1	0	1
(Venezuela) Deportivo Táchira	2	0	2
(Colombia) Santa Fe	3	0	3

Third stage
(Chile) Santiago Wanderers	1	0	1
(Colombia) Santa Fe	2	3	5

=== Winner G2 ===
First stage
(Argentina) Banfield	Bye
(Ecuador) Independiente del Valle	Bye
(Brazil) Chapecoense	Bye
(Uruguay) Nacional	Bye

Second stage
(Argentina) Banfield (a)	1	2	3
(Ecuador) Independiente del Valle	1	2	3
(Brazil) Chapecoense	0	0	0
(Uruguay) Nacional	1	1	2

Third stage
(Argentina) Banfield	2	0	2
(Uruguay) Nacional	2	1	3

=== Winner G3 ===
First stage
(Chile) Universidad de Concepción	Bye
(Brazil) Vasco da Gama	Bye
(Bolivia) Oriente Petrolero (a)	2	1	3
(Peru) Universitario	0	3	3
(Bolivia) Jorge Wilstermann	Bye

Second stage
(Chile) Universidad de Concepción	0	0	0
(Brazil) Vasco da Gama	4	2	6
(Bolivia) Oriente Petrolero	1	2	3
(Bolivia) Jorge Wilstermann	2	2	4

Third stage
(Brazil) Vasco da Gama (p)	4	0	4 (3)
(Bolivia) Jorge Wilstermann	0	4	4 (2)

=== Winner G4 ===
First stage
(Uruguay) Montevideo Wanderers	0	0	0
(Paraguay) Olimpia	0	2	2
(Colombia) Junior	Bye
(Venezuela) Carabobo	Bye
(Paraguay) Guaraní	Bye

Second stage
(Paraguay) Olimpia	1	1	2
(Colombia) Junior	0	3	3
(Venezuela) Carabobo	1	0	1
(Paraguay) Guaraní	0	6	6

Third stage
(Colombia) Junior	1	0	1
(Paraguay) Guaraní	0	0	0

== First stage ==
The first legs were played on 22 January, and the second legs were played on 26 January 2018.

Team 1	Agg.	Team 2	1st leg	2nd leg
Montevideo Wanderers (Uruguay)	0–2	(Paraguay) Olimpia	0–0	0–2
Macará (Ecuador)	1–1 (a)	(Venezuela) Deportivo Táchira	1–1	0–0
Oriente Petrolero (Bolivia)	3–3 (a)	(Peru) Universitario	2–0	1–3

=== Match E1 ===
22 January 2018
19:15 UTC−3

Montevideo Wanderers (Uruguay)	0–0	(Paraguay) Olimpia
	Report

Estadio Luis Franzini, Montevideo (Note: Montevideo Wanderers played their home match at Estadio Luis Franzini, Montevideo, instead of their regular stadium Estadio Alfredo Victor Viera, Montevideo.)
Attendance: 4,000
Referee: Anderson Daronco (Brazil)

26 January 2018
20:15 UTC−3

Olimpia (Paraguay)	2–0	(Uruguay) Montevideo Wanderers
Camacho 55'; Giménez 87'	Report

Estadio Defensores del Chaco, Asunción (Note: Olimpia played their home matches at Estadio Defensores del Chaco, Asunción, instead of their regular stadium Estadio Manuel Ferreira, Asunción.)
Attendance: 33,376
Referee: Fernando Rapallini (Argentina)

Olimpia won 2–0 on aggregate and advanced to the second stage (Match C5).

=== Match E2 ===
22 January 2018
18:00 UTC−5

Macará (Ecuador)	1–1	(Venezuela) Deportivo Táchira
Patta 16'	Report	Pérez Greco 68'

Estadio Bellavista, Ambato
Attendance: 14,000
Referee: Andrés Rojas (Colombia)

26 January 2018
20:15 UTC−4

Deportivo Táchira (Venezuela)	0–0	(Ecuador) Macará
	Report

Estadio Polideportivo de Pueblo Nuevo, San Cristóbal
Attendance: 8,000
Referee: Michael Espinoza (Peru)

Tied 1–1 on aggregate, Deportivo Táchira won on away goals and advanced to the second stage (Match C1).

=== Match E3 ===
22 January 2018
21:15 UTC−4

Oriente Petrolero (Bolivia)	2–0	(Peru) Universitario
Sánchez 27'; Freitas 79'	Report

Estadio Ramón Tahuichi Aguilera, Santa Cruz de la Sierra
Attendance: 21,500
Referee: Carlos Orbe (Ecuador)

26 January 2018
20:45 UTC−5

Universitario (Peru)	3–1	(Bolivia) Oriente Petrolero
Corzo 7', 60'; Chávez 65'	Report	Paredes 84'

Estadio Monumental "U", Lima
Attendance: 17,000
Referee: Esteban Ostojich (Uruguay)

Tied 3–3 on aggregate, Oriente Petrolero won on away goals and advanced to the second stage (Match C3).

== Second stage ==
The first legs were played on 30–31 January and 1 February, and the second legs were played on 6–8 February 2018.

Team 1	Agg.	Team 2	1st leg	2nd leg
Deportivo Táchira (Venezuela)	2–3	(Colombia) Santa Fe	2–3	0–0
Chapecoense (Brazil)	0–2	(Uruguay) Nacional	0–1	0–1
Oriente Petrolero (Bolivia)	3–4	(Bolivia) Jorge Wilstermann	1–2	2–2
Carabobo (Venezuela)	1–6	(Paraguay) Guaraní	1–0	0–6
Olimpia (Paraguay)	2–3	(Colombia) Junior	1–0	1–3
Universidad de Concepción (Chile)	0–6	(Brazil) Vasco da Gama	0–4	0–2
Banfield (Argentina)	3–3 (a)	(Ecuador) Independiente del Valle	1–1	2–2
Santiago Wanderers (Chile)	2–1	(Peru) Melgar	1–1	1–0

=== Match C1 ===
1 February 2018
18:15 UTC−4

Deportivo Táchira (Venezuela)	2–3	(Colombia) Santa Fe
Granados 10'; Almirón 21'	Report	Morelo 6', 50'; Tesillo 30'

Estadio Polideportivo de Pueblo Nuevo, San Cristóbal
Attendance: 10,000
Referee: Daniel Fedorczuk (Uruguay)

8 February 2018
19:00 UTC−5 (Note: The Santa Fe v Deportivo Táchira match was originally scheduled on 8 February 2018, 19:30 local time, but was re-scheduled to 19:00 local time.)

Santa Fe (Colombia)	0–0	(Venezuela) Deportivo Táchira
	Report

Estadio El Campín, Bogotá
Attendance: 9,668
Referee: Anderson Daronco (Brazil)

Santa Fe won 3–2 on aggregate and advanced to the third stage (Match G1).

=== Match C2 ===
31 January 2018
21:45 UTC−2

Chapecoense (Brazil)	0–1	(Uruguay) Nacional
	Report	Romero 73'

Arena Condá, Chapecó
Attendance: 11,367
Referee: Patricio Loustau (Argentina)

7 February 2018
20:45 UTC−3

Nacional (Uruguay)	1–0	(Brazil) Chapecoense
Romero 5'	Report

Estadio Gran Parque Central, Montevideo
Attendance: 30,000
Referee: Mario Díaz de Vivar (Paraguay)

Nacional won 2–0 on aggregate and advanced to the third stage (Match G2).

=== Match C3 ===
1 February 2018
20:30 UTC−4

Oriente Petrolero (Bolivia)	1–2	(Bolivia) Jorge Wilstermann
Áñez 37'	Report	Lucas Gaúcho 63' (pen.); Serginho 90+2'

Estadio Ramón Tahuichi Aguilera, Santa Cruz de la Sierra
Attendance: 19,000
Referee: Gustavo Murillo (Colombia)

8 February 2018
20:30 UTC−4

Jorge Wilstermann (Bolivia)	2–2	(Bolivia) Oriente Petrolero
Serginho 21'; Meleán 39'	Report	Freitas 58', 83'

Estadio Olímpico Patria, Sucre (Note: Jorge Wilstermann played their home matches at Estadio Olímpico Patria, Sucre, instead of their regular stadium Estadio Félix Capriles, Cochabamba.)
Attendance: 10,000
Referee: Germán Delfino (Argentina)

Jorge Wilstermann won 4–3 on aggregate and advanced to the third stage (Match G3).

=== Match C4 ===
30 January 2018
18:15 UTC−4

Carabobo (Venezuela)	1–0	(Paraguay) Guaraní
Mago 18'	Report

Estadio Metropolitano de Mérida, Mérida (Note: Carabobo played their home match at Estadio Metropolitano de Mérida, Mérida, instead of their regular stadium Estadio Misael Delgado, Valencia.)
Attendance: 1,000
Referee: Gery Vargas (Bolivia)

6 February 2018
19:15 UTC−3

Guaraní (Paraguay)	6–0	(Venezuela) Carabobo
Morel 2', 39'; Bogarín 46'; Imperiale 53'; Gamarra 70'; Marín 87'	Report

Estadio Defensores del Chaco, Asunción (Note: Guaraní played their home matches at Estadio Defensores del Chaco, Asunción, instead of their regular stadium Estadio Rogelio Livieres, Asunción.)
Attendance: 5,000
Referee: Raphael Claus (Brazil)

Guaraní won 6–1 on aggregate and advanced to the third stage (Match G4).

=== Match C5 ===
1 February 2018
21:30 UTC−3

Olimpia (Paraguay)	1–0	(Colombia) Junior
Santa Cruz 36'	Report

Estadio Defensores del Chaco, Asunción
Attendance: 32,743
Referee: Luiz Flávio de Oliveira (Brazil)

8 February 2018
21:15 UTC−5 (Note: The Junior v Olimpia match was originally scheduled on 8 February 2018, 17:15 local time, but was re-scheduled to 21:15 local time.)

Junior (Colombia)	3–1	(Paraguay) Olimpia
González 30'; Ruiz 57'; T. Gutiérrez 74'	Report	Camacho 44'

Estadio Metropolitano Roberto Meléndez, Barranquilla
Attendance: 15,604
Referee: Patricio Loustau (Argentina)

Junior won 3–2 on aggregate and advanced to the third stage (Match G4).

=== Match C6 ===
31 January 2018
20:45 UTC−3

Universidad de Concepción (Chile)	0–4	(Brazil) Vasco da Gama
	Report	Evander 2', 15'; Yago Pikachu 78'; Rildo 81'

Estadio Ester Roa, Concepción
Attendance: 11,455
Referee: Leodán González (Uruguay)

7 February 2018
21:45 UTC−2

Vasco da Gama (Brazil)	2–0	(Chile) Universidad de Concepción
Paulinho 5'; Yago Pikachu 41'	Report

Estádio São Januário, Rio de Janeiro
Attendance: 11,424
Referee: José Argote (Venezuela)

Vasco da Gama won 6–0 on aggregate and advanced to the third stage (Match G3).

=== Match C7 ===
30 January 2018
21:30 UTC−3

Banfield (Argentina)	1–1	(Ecuador) Independiente del Valle
Cvitanich 70' (pen.)	Report	Barreiro 90+1' (pen.)

Estadio Florencio Sola, Banfield
Attendance: 12,000
Referee: Diego Haro (Peru)

6 February 2018
19:30 UTC−5

Independiente del Valle (Ecuador)	2–2	(Argentina) Banfield
Barreiro 28'; B. Arce 64'	Report	Dátolo 23'; Sperduti 90'

Estadio Olímpico Atahualpa, Quito (Note: Independiente del Valle played their home match at Estadio Olímpico Atahualpa, Quito, instead of their regular stadium Estadio Rumiñahui, Sangolquí.)
Attendance: 10,000
Referee: Éber Aquino (Paraguay)

Tied 3–3 on aggregate, Banfield won on away goals and advanced to the third stage (Match G2).

=== Match C8 ===
30 January 2018
21:30 UTC−3

Santiago Wanderers (Chile)	1–1	(Peru) Melgar
Viotti 1'	Report	Cuesta 45+2'

Estadio Elías Figueroa Brander, Valparaíso
Attendance: 7,435
Referee: Alexis Herrera (Venezuela)

6 February 2018
19:30 UTC−5

Melgar (Peru)	0–1	(Chile) Santiago Wanderers
	Report	Medel 44'

Estadio Monumental de la UNSA, Arequipa
Attendance: 7,500
Referee: Ricardo Marques (Brazil)

Santiago Wanderers won 2–1 on aggregate and advanced to the third stage (Match G1).

== Third stage ==
The first legs were played on 13–15 February, and the second legs were played on 20–22 February 2018.

Team 1	Agg.	Team 2	1st leg	2nd leg
Santiago Wanderers (Chile)	1–5	(Colombia) Santa Fe	1–2	0–3
Banfield (Argentina)	2–3	(Uruguay) Nacional	2–2	0–1
Vasco da Gama (Brazil)	4–4 (3–2 p)	(Bolivia) Jorge Wilstermann	4–0	0–4
Junior (Colombia)	1–0	(Paraguay) Guaraní	1–0	0–0

=== Match G1 ===
13 February 2018
21:30 UTC−3

Santiago Wanderers (Chile)	1–2	(Colombia) Santa Fe
Cerezo 86'	Report	Morelo 29', 36' (pen.)

Estadio Elías Figueroa Brander, Valparaíso
Attendance: 9,793
Referee: José Argote (Venezuela)

20 February 2018
19:30 UTC−5

Santa Fe (Colombia)	3–0	(Chile) Santiago Wanderers
Morelo 18', 71'; Tesillo 78'	Report

Estadio El Campín, Bogotá
Attendance: 7,443
Referee: Víctor Carrillo (Peru)

Santa Fe won 5–1 on aggregate and advanced to the group stage (Group D).

=== Match G2 ===
14 February 2018
19:00 UTC−3

Banfield (Argentina)	2–2	(Uruguay) Nacional
Bertolo 57'; Cvitanich 90+2'	Report	Fernández 49'; Espino 81'

Estadio Florencio Sola, Banfield
Attendance: 18,000
Referee: Enrique Cáceres (Paraguay)

21 February 2018
21:45 UTC−3

Nacional (Uruguay)	1–0	(Argentina) Banfield
Zunino 90+4'	Report

Estadio Gran Parque Central, Montevideo
Attendance: 20,000
Referee: Sandro Ricci (Brazil)

Nacional won 3–2 on aggregate and advanced to the group stage (Group F).

=== Match G3 ===
14 February 2018
21:45 UTC−2

Vasco da Gama (Brazil)	4–0	(Bolivia) Jorge Wilstermann
Paulão 17'; Paulinho 40'; Yago Pikachu 87'; Rildo 90+3'	Report

Estádio São Januário, Rio de Janeiro
Attendance: 10,919
Referee: Fernando Rapallini (Argentina)

21 February 2018
20:45 UTC−4

Jorge Wilstermann (Bolivia)	4–0	(Brazil) Vasco da Gama
Zenteno 5', 70'; Pedriel 6'; Chávez 16'	Report
Penalties
Lucas Gaúcho (penalty missed); Melgar (penalty scored); Meleán (penalty missed); Ortiz (penalty scored); Alex Silva (penalty missed)	2–3	(penalty scored) Ríos; (penalty scored) Yago Pikachu; (penalty missed) Desábato; (penalty scored) Wellington; (penalty missed) Rildo

Estadio Olímpico Patria, Sucre
Attendance: 10,000
Referee: Wilmar Roldán (Colombia)

Tied 4–4 on aggregate, Vasco da Gama won on penalties and advanced to the group stage (Group E).

=== Match G4 ===
15 February 2018
17:15 UTC−5

Junior (Colombia)	1–0	(Paraguay) Guaraní
Chará 80'	Report

Estadio Metropolitano Roberto Meléndez, Barranquilla
Attendance: 14,617
Referee: Leodán González (Uruguay)

22 February 2018
21:30 UTC−3

Guaraní (Paraguay)	0–0	(Colombia) Junior
	Report

Estadio Defensores del Chaco, Asunción
Attendance: 10,000
Referee: Néstor Pitana (Argentina)

Junior won 1–0 on aggregate and advanced to the group stage (Group H).

== Copa Sudamericana qualification ==
The two best teams eliminated in the third stage entered the Copa Sudamericana second stage. Only matches in the third stage were considered for the ranking of teams.

Pos	Match	Third stage losers	Pld	W	D	L	GF	GA	GD	Pts	Qualification
1	G3	(Bolivia) Jorge Wilstermann	2	1	0	1	4	4	0	3	Copa Sudamericana
2	G2	(Argentina) Banfield	2	0	1	1	2	3	−1	1	Copa Sudamericana
3	G4	(Paraguay) Guaraní	2	0	1	1	0	1	−1	1	
4	G1	(Chile) Santiago Wanderers	2	0	0	2	1	5	−4	0	

Source: CONMEBOL
Rules for classification: 1) Points; 2) Goal difference; 3) Goals scored; 4) Away goals scored; 5) CONMEBOL ranking (Regulations Article 21).
