= 2018 Copa Sudamericana final stages =

The 2018 Copa Sudamericana final stages were played from 21 August to 12 December 2018. A total of 16 teams competed in the final stages to decide the champions of the 2018 Copa Sudamericana.

== Qualified teams ==
The 16 winners of the second stage advanced to the round of 16.

=== Seeding ===
Starting from the round of 16, the teams were seeded according to the second stage draw, with each team assigned a "seed" 1–16 corresponding to the tie they win (O1–O16) (Regulations Article 22.c).

Seed	Match	Second stage winners
1	O1	(Colombia) Millonarios
2	O2	(Brazil) Botafogo
3	O3	(Uruguay) Nacional
4	O4	(Argentina) Colón
5	O5	(Argentina) Banfield
6	O6	(Brazil) Fluminense
7	O7	(Brazil) Atlético Paranaense
8	O8	(Colombia) Deportivo Cali
9	O9	(Ecuador) LDU Quito
10	O10	(Venezuela) Caracas
11	O11	(Ecuador) Deportivo Cuenca
12	O12	(Argentina) Defensa y Justicia
13	O13	(Colombia) Junior
14	O14	(Argentina) San Lorenzo
15	O15	(Brazil) Bahia
16	O16	(Colombia) Santa Fe

== Format ==
Starting from the round of 16, the teams played a single-elimination tournament with the following rules:

- Each tie was played on a home-and-away two-legged basis, with the higher-seeded team hosting the second leg (Regulations Article 22.d).
- In the round of 16, quarterfinals, and semifinals, if tied on aggregate, the away goals rule would be used. If still tied, extra time would not be played, and the penalty shoot-out would be used to determine the winner (Regulations Article 27).
- In the finals, if tied on aggregate, the away goals rule would not be used, and 30 minutes of extra time would be played. If still tied after extra time, the penalty shoot-out would be used to determine the winner (Regulations Article 28).

== Bracket ==
The bracket starting from the round of 16 was determined as follows:

Round	Matchups
Round of 16	(Higher-seeded team host second leg): Match A: Winner O1 vs. Winner O16; Match B: Winner O2 vs. Winner O15; Match C: Winner O3 vs. Winner O14; Match D: Winner O4 vs. Winner O13; Match E: Winner O5 vs. Winner O12; Match F: Winner O6 vs. Winner O11; Match G: Winner O7 vs. Winner O10; Match H: Winner O8 vs. Winner O9
Quarterfinals	(Higher-seeded team host second leg): Match S1: Winner A vs. Winner H; Match S2: Winner B vs. Winner G; Match S3: Winner C vs. Winner F; Match S4: Winner D vs. Winner E
Semifinals	(Higher-seeded team host second leg): Match F1: Winner S1 vs. Winner S4; Match F2: Winner S2 vs. Winner S3
Finals	(Higher-seeded team host second leg): Winner F1 vs. Winner F2

The bracket was decided based on the second stage draw, which was held on 4 June 2018.

Round of 16
16	(Colombia) Santa Fe (p)	0	0	0 (5)
1	(Colombia) Millonarios	0	0	0 (3)
9	(Ecuador) LDU Quito	1	0	1 (1)
8	(Colombia) Deportivo Cali (p)	0	1	1 (3)
13	(Colombia) Junior	1	1	2
4	(Argentina) Colón	0	1	1
12	(Argentina) Defensa y Justicia	0	2	2
5	(Argentina) Banfield	0	0	0
15	(Brazil) Bahia (p)	2	1	3 (5)
2	(Brazil) Botafogo	1	2	3 (4)
10	(Venezuela) Caracas	0	1	1
7	(Brazil) Atlético Paranaense	2	2	4
11	(Ecuador) Deportivo Cuenca	0	0	0
6	(Brazil) Fluminense	2	2	4
14	(Argentina) San Lorenzo	3	0	3
3	(Uruguay) Nacional (a)	1	2	3

Quarterfinals
16	(Colombia) Santa Fe	1	2	3
8	(Colombia) Deportivo Cali	1	1	2
13	(Colombia) Junior (a)	2	1	3
12	(Argentina) Defensa y Justicia	0	3	3
15	(Brazil) Bahia	0	1	1 (1)
7	(Brazil) Atlético Paranaense (p)	1	0	1 (4)
6	(Brazil) Fluminense	1	1	2
3	(Uruguay) Nacional	1	0	1

Semifinals
16	(Colombia) Santa Fe	0	0	0
13	(Colombia) Junior	2	1	3
7	(Brazil) Atlético Paranaense	2	2	4
6	(Brazil) Fluminense	0	0	0

Finals
13	(Colombia) Junior	1	1	2 (3)
7	(Brazil) Atlético Paranaense (p)	1	1	2 (4)

== Round of 16 ==
The first legs were played on 21–22 August, 18–20 and 26 September, and the second legs were played on 19, 25, 27 September, and 2–4 October 2018.

Team 1	Agg.	Team 2	1st leg	2nd leg
Santa Fe (Colombia)	0–0 (5–3 p)	(Colombia) Millonarios	0–0	0–0
Bahia (Brazil)	3–3 (5–4 p)	(Brazil) Botafogo	2–1	1–2
San Lorenzo (Argentina)	3–3 (a)	(Uruguay) Nacional	3–1	0–2
Junior (Colombia)	2–1	(Argentina) Colón	1–0	1–1
Defensa y Justicia (Argentina)	2–0	(Argentina) Banfield	2–0	0–0
Deportivo Cuenca (Ecuador)	0–4	(Brazil) Fluminense	0–2	0–2
Caracas (Venezuela)	1–4	(Brazil) Atlético Paranaense	0–2	1–2
LDU Quito (Ecuador)	1–1 (1–3 p)	(Colombia) Deportivo Cali	1–0	0–1

=== Match A ===
18 September 2018
19:45 UTC−5

Santa Fe (Colombia)	0–0	(Colombia) Millonarios
	Report

Estadio El Campín, Bogotá
Referee: Fernando Rapallini (Argentina)

2 October 2018
19:45 UTC−5

Millonarios (Colombia)	0–0	(Colombia) Santa Fe
	Report
Penalties
Cadavid (penalty scored); Domínguez (penalty scored); Hauche (penalty missed); Quiñones (penalty scored)	3–5	(penalty scored) Morelo; (penalty scored) Guastavino; (penalty scored) Salazar; (penalty scored) Gordillo; (penalty scored) Zapata

Estadio El Campín, Bogotá
Referee: Raphael Claus (Brazil)

Tied 0–0 on aggregate, Santa Fe won on penalties and advanced to the quarterfinals (Match S1).

=== Match B ===
20 September 2018
21:45 UTC−3

Bahia (Brazil)	2–1	(Brazil) Botafogo
Ramires 4'; Clayton 59'	Report	Rodrigo Pimpão 61'

Arena Fonte Nova, Salvador
Referee: Piero Maza (Chile)

3 October 2018
21:45 UTC−3

Botafogo (Brazil)	2–1	(Brazil) Bahia
Rodrigo Pimpão 25'; Luiz Fernando 39'	Report	Edigar Junio 32'
Penalties
Rodrigo Lindoso (penalty scored); Aguirre (penalty scored); Marcinho (penalty missed); Kieza (penalty scored); Renatinho (penalty scored); Moisés (penalty missed)	4–5	(penalty scored) Gilberto; (penalty scored) Zé Rafael; (penalty missed) Jackson; (penalty scored) Allione; (penalty scored) Nílton; (penalty scored) Flávio

Estádio Olímpico Nilton Santos, Rio de Janeiro
Referee: Germán Delfino (Argentina)

Tied 3–3 on aggregate, Bahia won on penalties and advanced to the quarterfinals (Match S2).

=== Match C ===
22 August 2018
19:30 UTC−3

San Lorenzo (Argentina)	3–1	(Uruguay) Nacional
Erramuspe 18' (o.g.); Blandi 32', 79' (pen.)	Report	Bergessio 69' (pen.)

Estadio Pedro Bidegain, Buenos Aires
Referee: Raphael Claus (Brazil)

25 September 2018
21:15 UTC−3

Nacional (Uruguay)	2–0	(Argentina) San Lorenzo
Zunino 10'; Bergessio 54'	Report

Estadio Gran Parque Central, Montevideo
Referee: Wilmar Roldán (Colombia)

Tied 3–3 on aggregate, Nacional won on away goals and advanced to the quarterfinals (Match S3).

=== Match D ===
26 September 2018
19:15 UTC−5

Junior (Colombia)	1–0	(Argentina) Colón
Barrera 71'	Report

Estadio Metropolitano Roberto Meléndez, Barranquilla
Referee: Carlos Orbe (Ecuador)

4 October 2018
19:30 UTC−3

Colón (Argentina)	1–1	(Colombia) Junior
Fritzler 74'	Report	Moreno 81'

Estadio Brigadier General Estanislao López, Santa Fe
Referee: Diego Haro (Peru)

Junior won 2–1 on aggregate and advanced to the quarterfinals (Match S4).

=== Match E ===
21 August 2018
19:30 UTC−3

Defensa y Justicia (Argentina)	0–0	(Argentina) Banfield
	Report

Estadio Norberto Tomaghello, Gobernador Costa
Referee: Alexis Herrera (Venezuela)

27 September 2018
21:15 UTC−3

Banfield (Argentina)	0–2	(Argentina) Defensa y Justicia
	Report	Barboza 74'; Aliseda 90+4'

Estadio Florencio Sola, Banfield
Referee: Esteban Ostojich (Uruguay)

Defensa y Justicia won 2–0 on aggregate and advanced to the quarterfinals (Match S4).

=== Match F ===
20 September 2018
17:30 UTC−5

Deportivo Cuenca (Ecuador)	0–2	(Brazil) Fluminense
	Report	Everaldo 22'; Luciano 83'

Estadio Rodrigo Paz Delgado, Quito (Note: Deportivo Cuenca played their home match against Fluminense at Estadio Rodrigo Paz Delgado, Quito, instead of their regular stadium Estadio Alejandro Serrano Aguilar, Cuenca.)
Referee: Alexis Herrera (Venezuela)

4 October 2018
19:30 UTC−3

Fluminense (Brazil)	2–0	(Ecuador) Deportivo Cuenca
Digão 33'; Richard 75'	Report

Estádio do Maracanã, Rio de Janeiro
Referee: Andrés Rojas (Colombia)

Fluminense won 4–0 on aggregate and advanced to the quarterfinals (Match S3).

=== Match G ===
19 September 2018
18:30 UTC−4

Caracas (Venezuela)	0–2	(Brazil) Atlético Paranaense
	Report	Raphael Veiga 41', 72'

Estadio Olímpico de la UCV, Caracas
Referee: Andrés Rojas (Colombia)

3 October 2018
19:30 UTC−3

Atlético Paranaense (Brazil)	2–1	(Venezuela) Caracas
Marcelo Cirino 30'; Renan Lodi 57'	Report	Garcés 48'

Arena da Baixada, Curitiba
Referee: Michael Espinoza (Peru)

Atlético Paranaense won 4–1 on aggregate and advanced to the quarterfinals (Match S2).

=== Match H ===
22 August 2018
19:45 UTC−5

LDU Quito (Ecuador)	1–0	(Colombia) Deportivo Cali
A. Julio 23'	Report

Estadio Rodrigo Paz Delgado, Quito
Referee: Esteban Ostojich (Uruguay)

19 September 2018
19:45 UTC−5

Deportivo Cali (Colombia)	1–0	(Ecuador) LDU Quito
Sand 44'	Report
Penalties
Pérez (penalty scored); Torres (penalty scored); Giraldo (penalty missed); Caicedo (penalty missed); Sand (penalty scored)	3–1	(penalty missed) Guerrero; (penalty missed) Rodríguez; (penalty missed) Orejuela; (penalty scored) Cruz

Estadio Deportivo Cali, Palmira
Referee: Diego Haro (Peru)

Tied 1–1 on aggregate, Deportivo Cali won on penalties and advanced to the quarterfinals (Match S1).

== Quarterfinals ==
The first legs were played on 23–25 October, and the second legs were played on 30–31 October and 1 November 2018.

Team 1	Agg.	Team 2	1st leg	2nd leg
Santa Fe (Colombia)	3–2	(Colombia) Deportivo Cali	1–1	2–1
Bahia (Brazil)	1–1 (1–4 p)	(Brazil) Atlético Paranaense	0–1	1–0
Fluminense (Brazil)	2–1	(Uruguay) Nacional	1–1	1–0
Junior (Colombia)	3–3 (a)	(Argentina) Defensa y Justicia	2–0	1–3

=== Match S1 ===
23 October 2018
19:45 UTC−5

Santa Fe (Colombia)	1–1	(Colombia) Deportivo Cali
Morelo 45' (pen.)	Report	Palomeque 32'

Estadio El Campín, Bogotá
Referee: Roddy Zambrano (Ecuador)

30 October 2018
19:45 UTC−5

Deportivo Cali (Colombia)	1–2	(Colombia) Santa Fe
Benedetti 72'	Report	Morelo 15' (pen.); Guastavino 16'

Estadio Deportivo Cali, Palmira
Referee: Víctor Carrillo (Peru)

Santa Fe won 3–2 on aggregate and advanced to the semifinals (Match F1).

=== Match S2 ===
24 October 2018
21:45 UTC−3

Bahia (Brazil)	0–1	(Brazil) Atlético Paranaense
	Report	Pablo 66'

Arena Fonte Nova, Salvador
Referee: Fernando Rapallini (Argentina)

31 October 2018
21:45 UTC−3

Atlético Paranaense (Brazil)	0–1	(Brazil) Bahia
	Report	Douglas Grolli 45+1'
Penalties
Jonathan (penalty scored); Raphael Veiga (penalty scored); González (penalty scored); Pablo (penalty scored)	4–1	(penalty missed) Vinícius; (penalty missed) Zé Rafael; (penalty scored) Edigar Junio

Arena da Baixada, Curitiba
Referee: Diego Haro (Peru)

Tied 1–1 on aggregate, Atlético Paranaense won on penalties and advanced to the semifinals (Match F2).

=== Match S3 ===
24 October 2018
19:30 UTC−3

Fluminense (Brazil)	1–1	(Uruguay) Nacional
Gum 17'	Report	Zunino 87'

Estádio Olímpico Nilton Santos, Rio de Janeiro (Note: Fluminense played their home match against Nacional at Estádio Olímpico Nilton Santos, Rio de Janeiro, instead of their regular stadium Estádio do Maracanã, Rio de Janeiro.)
Referee: Patricio Loustau (Argentina)

31 October 2018
19:30 UTC−3

Nacional (Uruguay)	0–1	(Brazil) Fluminense
	Report	Luciano 48'

Estadio Gran Parque Central, Montevideo
Referee: Roberto Tobar (Chile)

Fluminense won 2–1 on aggregate and advanced to the semifinals (Match F2).

=== Match S4 ===
25 October 2018
19:45 UTC−5

Junior (Colombia)	2–0	(Argentina) Defensa y Justicia
Díaz 74'; Pérez 90+2' (pen.)	Report

Estadio Metropolitano Roberto Meléndez, Barranquilla
Referee: Ricardo Marques (Brazil)

1 November 2018
21:45 UTC−3

Defensa y Justicia (Argentina)	3–1	(Colombia) Junior
Miranda 18'; Fernández 28', 53'	Report	Díaz 71'

Estadio Libertadores de América, Avellaneda (Note: Defensa y Justicia played their home match against Junior at Estadio Libertadores de América, Avellaneda, instead of their regular stadium Estadio Norberto Tomaghello, Gobernador Costa.)
Referee: Raphael Claus (Brazil)

Tied 3–3 on aggregate, Junior won on away goals and advanced to the semifinals (Match F1).

== Semifinals ==
The first legs were played on 7–8 November, and the second legs were played on 28–29 November 2018.

Team 1	Agg.	Team 2	1st leg	2nd leg
Santa Fe (Colombia)	0–3	(Colombia) Junior	0–2	0–1
Atlético Paranaense (Brazil)	4–0	(Brazil) Fluminense	2–0	2–0

=== Match F1 ===
8 November 2018
19:45 UTC−5

Santa Fe (Colombia)	0–2	(Colombia) Junior
	Report	T. Gutiérrez 39'; Piedrahita 47'

Estadio El Campín, Bogotá
Referee: Esteban Ostojich (Uruguay)

29 November 2018
19:45 UTC−5

Junior (Colombia)	1–0	(Colombia) Santa Fe
T. Gutiérrez 22'	Report

Estadio Metropolitano Roberto Meléndez, Barranquilla
Referee: Patricio Loustau (Argentina)

Junior won 3–0 on aggregate and advanced to the finals.

=== Match F2 ===
7 November 2018
21:45 UTC−2

Atlético Paranaense (Brazil)	2–0	(Brazil) Fluminense
Renan Lodi 19'; Rony 77'	Report

Arena da Baixada, Curitiba
Referee: Roddy Zambrano (Ecuador)

28 November 2018
21:45 UTC−2

Fluminense (Brazil)	0–2	(Brazil) Atlético Paranaense
	Report	Nikão 4'; Bruno Guimarães 54'

Estádio do Maracanã, Rio de Janeiro
Referee: Julio Bascuñán (Chile)

Atlético Paranaense won 4–0 on aggregate and advanced to the finals.

== Finals ==
In the finals, if tied on aggregate, the away goals rule would not be used, and 30 minutes of extra time would be played. If still tied after extra time, the penalty shoot-out would be used to determine the winner (Regulations Article 28).

The first leg was played on 5 December, and the second leg was played on 12 December 2018.

5 December 2018
19:45 UTC−5

Junior (Colombia)	1–1	(Brazil) Atlético Paranaense
González 52'	Report	Pablo 50'

Estadio Metropolitano Roberto Meléndez, Barranquilla
Attendance: 38,094
Referee: Diego Haro (Peru)

12 December 2018
21:45 UTC−2

Atlético Paranaense (Brazil)	1–1 (a.e.t.)	(Colombia) Junior
Pablo 26'	Report	T. Gutiérrez 57'
Penalties
Jonathan (penalty scored); Raphael Veiga (penalty scored); Bergson (penalty scored); Renan Lodi (penalty missed); Thiago Heleno (penalty scored)	4–3	(penalty scored) Narváez; (penalty missed) Fuentes; (penalty scored) Pérez; (penalty missed) T. Gutiérrez; (penalty scored) Viera

Arena da Baixada, Curitiba
Attendance: 40,263
Referee: Roberto Tobar (Chile)

Tied 2–2 on aggregate, Atlético Paranaense won on penalties.
