= 2018 Copa Libertadores =

59th season of Copa Libertadores

Copa CONMEBOL Libertadores 2018
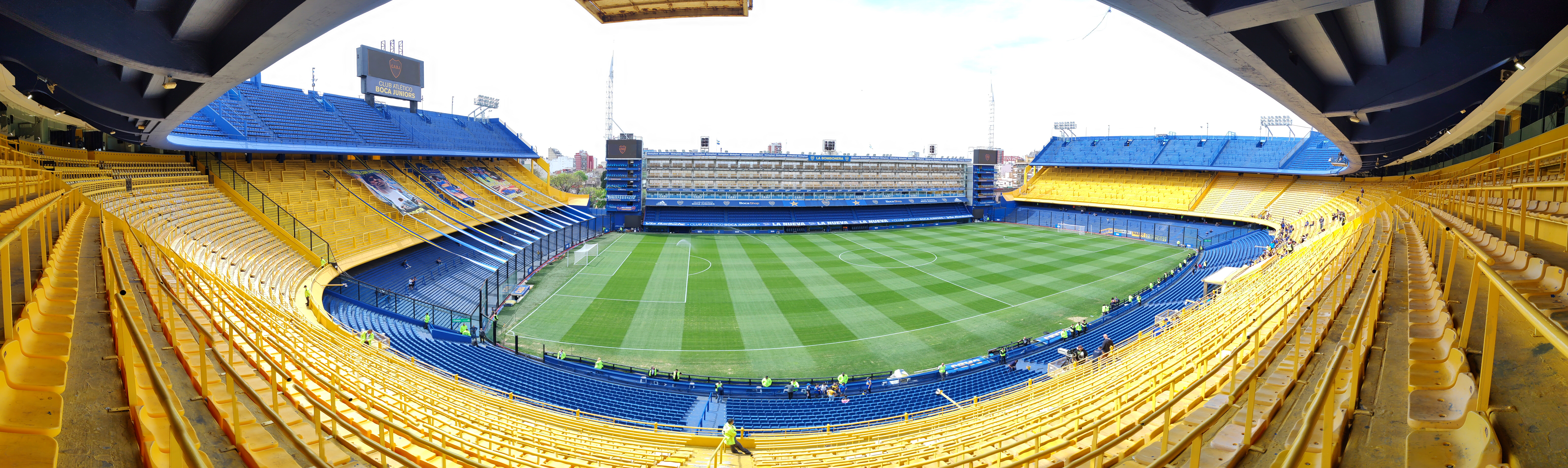
- La Bombonera in Buenos Aires (top) and Santiago Bernabéu Stadium in Madrid (bottom), venues for the final

Tournament details
- Dates: 22 January – 9 December 2018
- Teams: 47 (from 10 associations)

Final positions
- Champions: (Argentina) River Plate (4th title)
- Runners-up: (Argentina) Boca Juniors

Tournament statistics
- Matches played: 156
- Goals scored: 353 (2.26 per match)
- Top scorer(s): (Colombia) Miguel Borja (Colombia) Wilson Morelo (9 goals each)
- Best player: (Argentina) Gonzalo Martínez

The 2018 Copa CONMEBOL Libertadores was the 59th edition of the CONMEBOL Libertadores (also referred to as the Copa Libertadores), South America's premier club football tournament organized by CONMEBOL.

River Plate defeated Boca Juniors in the finals by an aggregate score of 5–3 to win their fourth tournament title. As champions, they qualified as the CONMEBOL representative at the 2018 FIFA Club World Cup in the United Arab Emirates and also earned the right to play against the winners of the 2018 Copa Sudamericana in the 2019 Recopa Sudamericana. They also automatically qualified for the 2019 Copa Libertadores group stage. Grêmio were the defending champions, but were defeated by River Plate in the semi-finals.

The first leg of the final was played at the Estadio Alberto J. Armando in Buenos Aires, Argentina on 11 November 2018, while the second leg took place outside South America at the Santiago Bernabéu Stadium in Madrid, Spain (a neutral venue) on 9 December 2018, after it was postponed and moved by CONMEBOL due to violence against the Boca Juniors team. The New York Times reported that the second leg was referred to as the "Final to End All Finals" and the biggest game in Argentine sport history.

== Teams ==
The following 47 teams from the 10 CONMEBOL member associations qualified for the tournament:

- Copa Libertadores champions
- Copa Sudamericana champions
- Brazil: 7 berths
- Argentina: 6 berths
- All other associations: 4 berths each

Teams from Mexico, as they did in 2017, withdrew from the 2018 Copa Libertadores, citing schedule conflicts.

The entry stage was determined as follows:

- Group stage: 28 teams
  - Copa Libertadores champions
  - Copa Sudamericana champions
  - Teams which qualified for berths 1–5 from Argentina and Brazil
  - Teams which qualified for berths 1–2 from all other associations
- Second stage: 13 teams
  - Teams which qualified for berths 6–7 from Brazil
  - Team which qualified for berth 6 from Argentina
  - Teams which qualified for berths 3–4 from Chile and Colombia
  - Teams which qualified for berths 3 from all other associations
- First stage: 6 teams
  - Teams which qualified for berths 4 from Bolivia, Ecuador, Paraguay, Peru, Uruguay and Venezuela

Association	Team (Berth)	Entry stage	Qualification method
Argentina (6 + 1 berths)	Independiente (Argentina 1; Copa Sudamericana)	Group stage	2017 Copa Sudamericana champions
Argentina (6 + 1 berths)	Boca Juniors (Argentina 2)	Group stage	2016–17 Primera División champions
Argentina (6 + 1 berths)	River Plate (Argentina 3)	Group stage	2016–17 Primera División runners-up
Argentina (6 + 1 berths)	Atlético Tucumán (Argentina 4)	Group stage	2016–17 Copa Argentina runners-up
Argentina (6 + 1 berths)	Estudiantes (Argentina 5)	Group stage	2016–17 Primera División 3rd place
Argentina (6 + 1 berths)	Racing (Argentina 6)	Group stage	2016–17 Primera División 4th place
Argentina (6 + 1 berths)	Banfield (Argentina 7)	Second stage	2016–17 Primera División 5th place
Bolivia (4 berths)	The Strongest (Bolivia 1)	Group stage	2016 Apertura champions
Bolivia (4 berths)	Bolívar (Bolivia 2)	Group stage	2017 Apertura champions
Bolivia (4 berths)	Jorge Wilstermann (Bolivia 3)	Second stage	2017 Clausura best team not yet qualified
Bolivia (4 berths)	Oriente Petrolero (Bolivia 4)	First stage	2016–17 Primera División aggregate table best team not yet qualified
Brazil (7 + 1 berths)	Grêmio (Brazil 1; Title holders)	Group stage	2017 Copa Libertadores champions
Brazil (7 + 1 berths)	Corinthians (Brazil 2)	Group stage	2017 Campeonato Brasileiro Série A champions
Brazil (7 + 1 berths)	Cruzeiro (Brazil 3)	Group stage	2017 Copa do Brasil champions
Brazil (7 + 1 berths)	Palmeiras (Brazil 4)	Group stage	2017 Campeonato Brasileiro Série A runners-up
Brazil (7 + 1 berths)	Santos (Brazil 5)	Group stage	2017 Campeonato Brasileiro Série A 3rd place
Brazil (7 + 1 berths)	Flamengo (Brazil 6)	Group stage	2017 Campeonato Brasileiro Série A 6th place
Brazil (7 + 1 berths)	Vasco da Gama (Brazil 7)	Second stage	2017 Campeonato Brasileiro Série A 7th place
Brazil (7 + 1 berths)	Chapecoense (Brazil 8)	Second stage	2017 Campeonato Brasileiro Série A 8th place
Chile (4 berths)	Universidad de Chile (Chile 1)	Group stage	2017 Clausura champions
Chile (4 berths)	Colo-Colo (Chile 2)	Group stage	2017 Transición champions
Chile (4 berths)	Santiago Wanderers (Chile 3)	Second stage	2017 Copa Chile champions
Chile (4 berths)	Universidad de Concepción (Chile 4)	Second stage	2017 Primera División runners-up playoff winners
Colombia (4 berths)	Atlético Nacional (Colombia 1)	Group stage	2017 Apertura champions
Colombia (4 berths)	Millonarios (Colombia 2)	Group stage	2017 Finalización champions
Colombia (4 berths)	Santa Fe (Colombia 3)	Second stage	2017 Primera A aggregate table best team not yet qualified
Colombia (4 berths)	Junior (Colombia 4)	Second stage	2017 Copa Colombia champions
Ecuador (4 berths)	Emelec (Ecuador 1)	Group stage	2017 Serie A champions
Ecuador (4 berths)	Delfín (Ecuador 2)	Group stage	2017 Serie A runners-up
Ecuador (4 berths)	Independiente del Valle (Ecuador 3)	Second stage	2017 Serie A aggregate table best team not yet qualified
Ecuador (4 berths)	Macará (Ecuador 4)	First stage	2017 Serie A aggregate table 2nd best team not yet qualified
Paraguay (4 berths)	Cerro Porteño (Paraguay 1)	Group stage	2017 Primera División tournament champions with better record in aggregate table
Paraguay (4 berths)	Libertad (Paraguay 2)	Group stage	2017 Primera División tournament champions with worse record in aggregate table
Paraguay (4 berths)	Guaraní (Paraguay 3)	Second stage	2017 Primera División aggregate table best team not yet qualified
Paraguay (4 berths)	Olimpia (Paraguay 4)	First stage	2017 Primera División aggregate table 2nd best team not yet qualified
Peru (4 berths)	Alianza Lima (Peru 1)	Group stage	2017 Torneo Descentralizado champions
Peru (4 berths)	Real Garcilaso (Peru 2)	Group stage	2017 Torneo Descentralizado runners-up
Peru (4 berths)	Melgar (Peru 3)	Second stage	2017 Torneo de Verano winners
Peru (4 berths)	Universitario (Peru 4)	First stage	2017 Torneo Descentralizado aggregate table best team not yet qualified
Uruguay (4 berths)	Peñarol (Uruguay 1)	Group stage	2017 Primera División champions
Uruguay (4 berths)	Defensor Sporting (Uruguay 2)	Group stage	2017 Primera División runners-up
Uruguay (4 berths)	Nacional (Uruguay 3)	Second stage	2017 Primera División aggregate table best team not yet qualified
Uruguay (4 berths)	Montevideo Wanderers (Uruguay 4)	First stage	2017 Primera División aggregate table 2nd best team not yet qualified
Venezuela (4 berths)	Monagas (Venezuela 1)	Group stage	2017 Primera División champions
Venezuela (4 berths)	Deportivo Lara (Venezuela 2)	Group stage	2017 Primera División runners-up
Venezuela (4 berths)	Carabobo (Venezuela 3)	Second stage	2017 Primera División aggregate table best team not yet qualified
Venezuela (4 berths)	Deportivo Táchira (Venezuela 4)	First stage	2017 Primera División aggregate table 2nd best team not yet qualified

== Schedule ==
The schedule of the competition was as follows. The first stage matches were played on Monday and Friday, instead of the usual midweek of Tuesday, Wednesday or Thursday. The finals were initially scheduled for 7 and 28 November, but were moved to 10 and 24 November after the finalists were confirmed.

Stage	Draw date	First leg	Second leg
First stage	20 December 2017 (Luque, Paraguay)	22 January 2018	26 January 2018
Second stage	20 December 2017 (Luque, Paraguay)	30 January – 1 February 2018	6–8 February 2018
Third stage	20 December 2017 (Luque, Paraguay)	13–15 February 2018	20–22 February 2018
Group stage	20 December 2017 (Luque, Paraguay)	Week 1: 27 February – 1 March 2018; Week 2: 13–15 March 2018; Week 3: 3–5 April 2018; Week 4: 11 & 17–19 April 2018; Week 5: 24–26 April 2018; Week 6: 1–3 May 2018; Week 7: 15–17 May 2018; Week 8: 22–24 May 2018	
Round of 16	4 June 2018 (Luque, Paraguay)	7–9 & 21 August 2018	28–30 August 2018
Quarter-finals	4 June 2018 (Luque, Paraguay)	18–20 September 2018	2–4 October 2018
Semi-finals	4 June 2018 (Luque, Paraguay)	23–25 October 2018	30 October – 1 November 2018
Finals	4 June 2018 (Luque, Paraguay)	10 November 2018 (postponed to 11 November)	24 November 2018 (postponed to 9 December)

== Draws ==
Location of teams of the 2018 Copa Libertadores.
Brown: Group A; Red: Group B; Orange: Group C;
Yellow: Group D; Green: Group E; Blue: Group F;
Purple: Group G; Pink: Group H; White: Play-off rounds.

The draw for the qualifying stages and group stage was held on 20 December 2017, 20:00 PYST (UTC−3), at the CONMEBOL Convention Centre in Luque, Paraguay.

Teams were seeded by their CONMEBOL ranking of the Copa Libertadores (shown in parentheses), taking into account of the following three factors:

1. Performance in the last 10 years, taking into account Copa Libertadores results in the period 2008–2017
2. Historical coefficient, taking into account Copa Libertadores results in the period 1960–2007
3. Local tournament champion, with bonus points awarded to domestic league champions of the last 10 years

For the first stage, the six teams were drawn into three ties (E1–E3), with the seeded teams hosting the second leg.

First stage draw
Seeded	Unseeded
(Paraguay) Olimpia (9); (Peru) Universitario (40); (Venezuela) Deportivo Táchira (46)	(Uruguay) Montevideo Wanderers (70); (Bolivia) Oriente Petrolero (76); (Ecuador) Macará (208)

For the second stage, the 16 teams were drawn into eight ties (C1–C8), with the seeded teams hosting the second leg. Teams from the same association could not be drawn into the same tie, excluding the winners of the first stage, which were unseeded and whose identity was not known at the time of the draw, and could be drawn into the same tie with another team from the same association.

Second stage draw
Seeded	Unseeded
(Uruguay) Nacional (5); (Colombia) Santa Fe (21); (Paraguay) Guaraní (28); (Ecuador) Independiente del Valle (29); (Bolivia) Jorge Wilstermann (43); (Brazil) Vasco da Gama (54); (Colombia) Junior (60); (Peru) Melgar (82)	(Brazil) Chapecoense (89); (Argentina) Banfield (91); (Chile) Santiago Wanderers (126); (Venezuela) Carabobo (161); (Chile) Universidad de Concepción (193); First stage winner E1; First stage winner E2; First stage winner E3

Notes

1. ^{†} The identity of the team Chile 4 was not known at the time of the draw, and was unseeded in the second stage draw.

For the third stage, no draw was made, and the eight teams were allocated into the following four ties (G1–G4), with the second stage winners with the higher CONMEBOL ranking hosting the second leg. As the identity of the winners of the second stage was not known at the time of the draw, they could be drawn into the same tie with another team from the same association.

- Second stage winner C1 vs. Second stage winner C8
- Second stage winner C2 vs. Second stage winner C7
- Second stage winner C3 vs. Second stage winner C6
- Second stage winner C4 vs. Second stage winner C5

For the group stage, the 32 teams were drawn into eight groups (Groups A–H, also denoted as Groups 1–8) of four containing a team from each of the four pots. Teams from the same association could not be drawn into the same group, excluding the winners of the third stage, which were allocated to Pot 4 and whose identity was not known at the time of the draw, and could be drawn into the same group with another team from the same association.

Group stage draw
Pot 1	Pot 2	Pot 3	Pot 4
(Brazil) Grêmio (3); (Argentina) River Plate (1); (Argentina) Boca Juniors (2); (Colombia) Atlético Nacional (4); (Uruguay) Peñarol (6); (Brazil) Santos (11); (Brazil) Corinthians (12); (Brazil) Cruzeiro (13)	(Argentina) Independiente (31); (Ecuador) Emelec (14); (Argentina) Estudiantes (17); (Paraguay) Cerro Porteño (18); (Brazil) Palmeiras (22); (Bolivia) Bolívar (23); (Paraguay) Libertad (24); Universidad de Chile (25)	(Bolivia) The Strongest (26); (Chile) Colo-Colo (27); (Argentina) Racing (33); (Brazil) Flamengo (35); (Uruguay) Defensor Sporting (36); (Peru) Alianza Lima (58); (Colombia) Millonarios (65); (Peru) Real Garcilaso (68)	(Argentina) Atlético Tucumán (88); (Venezuela) Deportivo Lara (105); (Ecuador) Delfín (206); (Venezuela) Monagas (207); Third stage winner G1; Third stage winner G2; Third stage winner G3; Third stage winner G4

Notes

1. ^{†} Defending Copa Libertadores champion, automatically seeded into Pot 1 and allocated to Group A in the group stage draw.
2. ^{‡} Defending Copa Sudamericana champion, automatically seeded into Pot 2 in the group stage draw.

The draw for the round of 16 was held on 4 June 2018, 20:00 PYT (UTC−4), at the CONMEBOL Convention Centre in Luque, Paraguay. For the round of 16, the 16 teams were drawn into eight ties (A–H) between a group winner (Pot 1) and a group runner-up (Pot 2), with the group winners hosting the second leg. Teams from the same association or the same group could be drawn into the same tie.

== Qualifying stages ==
In the qualifying stages, each tie was played on a home-and-away two-legged basis. If tied on aggregate, the away goals rule was used. If still tied, extra time was not played, and a penalty shoot-out was used to determine the winner (Regulations Article 29). The qualifying stages were structured as follows:

- First stage (6 teams): The three winners of the first stage advanced to the second stage to join the 13 teams which were given byes to the second stage.
- Second stage (16 teams): The eight winners of the second stage advanced to the third stage.
- Third stage (8 teams): The four winners of the third stage advanced to the group stage to join the 28 direct entrants. The two best teams eliminated in the third stage entered the Copa Sudamericana second stage.

=== First stage ===
Team 1	Agg.	Team 2	1st leg	2nd leg
Montevideo Wanderers (Uruguay)	0–2	(Paraguay) Olimpia	0–0	0–2
Macará (Ecuador)	1–1 (a)	(Venezuela) Deportivo Táchira	1–1	0–0
Oriente Petrolero (Bolivia)	3–3 (a)	(Peru) Universitario	2–0	1–3

=== Second stage ===
Team 1	Agg.	Team 2	1st leg	2nd leg
Deportivo Táchira (Venezuela)	2–3	(Colombia) Santa Fe	2–3	0–0
Chapecoense (Brazil)	0–2	(Uruguay) Nacional	0–1	0–1
Oriente Petrolero (Bolivia)	3–4	(Bolivia) Jorge Wilstermann	1–2	2–2
Carabobo (Venezuela)	1–6	(Paraguay) Guaraní	1–0	0–6
Olimpia (Paraguay)	2–3	(Colombia) Junior	1–0	1–3
Universidad de Concepción (Chile)	0–6	(Brazil) Vasco da Gama	0–4	0–2
Banfield (Argentina)	3–3 (a)	(Ecuador) Independiente del Valle	1–1	2–2
Santiago Wanderers (Chile)	2–1	(Peru) Melgar	1–1	1–0

=== Third stage ===
Team 1	Agg.	Team 2	1st leg	2nd leg
Santiago Wanderers (Chile)	1–5	(Colombia) Santa Fe	1–2	0–3
Banfield (Argentina)	2–3	(Uruguay) Nacional	2–2	0–1
Vasco da Gama (Brazil)	4–4 (3–2 p)	(Bolivia) Jorge Wilstermann	4–0	0–4
Junior (Colombia)	1–0	(Paraguay) Guaraní	1–0	0–0

=== Copa Sudamericana qualification ===
The two best teams eliminated in the third stage entered the Copa Sudamericana second stage. Only matches in the third stage were considered for the ranking of teams.

Pos	Third stage losers	Pld	W	D	L	GF	GA	GD	Pts	Qualification
1	(Bolivia) Jorge Wilstermann	2	1	0	1	4	4	0	3	Copa Sudamericana
2	(Argentina) Banfield	2	0	1	1	2	3	−1	1	Copa Sudamericana
3	(Paraguay) Guaraní	2	0	1	1	0	1	−1	1	
4	(Chile) Santiago Wanderers	2	0	0	2	1	5	−4	0	

Source: CONMEBOL
Rules for classification: 1) Points; 2) Goal difference; 3) Goals scored; 4) Away goals scored; 5) CONMEBOL ranking (Regulations Article 21).

== Group stage ==
In the group stage, each group was played on a home-and-away round-robin basis. The teams were ranked according to points (3 points for a win, 1 point for a draw, and 0 points for a loss). If tied on points, the following criteria were used to determine the ranking: 1. Goal difference; 2. Goals scored; 3. Away goals scored; 4. CONMEBOL ranking (Regulations Article 28).

The winners and runners-up of each group advanced to the round of 16 of the knockout stages. The third-placed teams of each group entered the Copa Sudamericana second stage.

=== Group A ===
Pos	Team	Pld	W	D	L	GF	GA	GD	Pts	Qualification	GRE	CPO	DEF	MON
1	(Brazil) Grêmio	6	4	2	0	13	2	+11	14	Round of 16	—	5–0	1–0	4–0
2	(Paraguay) Cerro Porteño	6	4	1	1	8	8	0	13	Round of 16	0–0	—	2–1	3–2
3	(Uruguay) Defensor Sporting	6	1	1	4	5	7	−2	4	Copa Sudamericana	1–1	0–1	—	3–1
4	(Venezuela) Monagas	6	1	0	5	5	14	−9	3		1–2	0–2	1–0	—

Source: CONMEBOL

=== Group B ===
Pos	Team	Pld	W	D	L	GF	GA	GD	Pts	Qualification	ATN	CCL	BOL	DEL
1	(Colombia) Atlético Nacional	6	3	1	2	9	3	+6	10	Round of 16	—	0–0	4–1	4–0
2	(Chile) Colo-Colo	6	2	2	2	5	5	0	8	Round of 16	0–1	—	2–0	0–2
3	(Bolivia) Bolívar	6	2	2	2	6	9	−3	8	Copa Sudamericana	1–0	1–1	—	2–1
4	(Ecuador) Delfín	6	2	1	3	6	9	−3	7		1–0	1–2	1–1	—

Source: CONMEBOL

=== Group C ===
Pos	Team	Pld	W	D	L	GF	GA	GD	Pts	Qualification	LIB	ATU	PEÑ	STR
1	(Paraguay) Libertad	6	4	1	1	10	4	+6	13	Round of 16	—	0–0	2–1	3–0
2	(Argentina) Atlético Tucumán	6	3	1	2	7	6	+1	10	Round of 16	0–2	—	1–0	3–0
3	(Uruguay) Peñarol	6	3	0	3	8	5	+3	9	Copa Sudamericana	2–0	3–1	—	2–0
4	(Bolivia) The Strongest	6	1	0	5	3	13	−10	3		1–3	1–2	1–0	—

Source: CONMEBOL

=== Group D ===
Pos	Team	Pld	W	D	L	GF	GA	GD	Pts	Qualification	RIV	FLA	SFE	EME
1	(Argentina) River Plate	6	3	3	0	6	3	+3	12	Round of 16	—	0–0	0–0	2–1
2	(Brazil) Flamengo	6	2	4	0	7	4	+3	10	Round of 16	2–2	—	1–1	2–0
3	(Colombia) Santa Fe	6	1	4	1	5	3	+2	7	Copa Sudamericana	0–1	0–0	—	1–1
4	(Ecuador) Emelec	6	0	1	5	3	11	−8	1		0–1	1–2	0–3	—

Source: CONMEBOL

=== Group E ===
Pos	Team	Pld	W	D	L	GF	GA	GD	Pts	Qualification	CRU	RAC	VAS	UCH
1	(Brazil) Cruzeiro	6	3	2	1	15	5	+10	11	Round of 16	—	2–1	0–0	7–0
2	(Argentina) Racing	6	3	2	1	12	6	+6	11	Round of 16	4–2	—	4–0	1–0
3	(Brazil) Vasco da Gama	6	1	2	3	3	10	−7	5	Copa Sudamericana	0–4	1–1	—	0–1
4	Universidad de Chile	6	1	2	3	2	11	−9	5		0–0	1–1	0–2	—

Source: CONMEBOL

=== Group F ===
Pos	Team	Pld	W	D	L	GF	GA	GD	Pts	Qualification	SAN	EST	NAC	RGA
1	(Brazil) Santos	6	3	1	2	6	4	+2	10	Round of 16	—	2–0	3–1	0–0
2	(Argentina) Estudiantes	6	2	2	2	6	4	+2	8	Round of 16	0–1	—	3–1	3–0
3	(Uruguay) Nacional	6	2	2	2	7	6	+1	8	Copa Sudamericana	1–0	0–0	—	4–0
4	(Peru) Real Garcilaso	6	1	3	2	2	7	−5	6		2–0	0–0	0–0	—

Source: CONMEBOL

=== Group G ===
Pos	Team	Pld	W	D	L	GF	GA	GD	Pts	Qualification	COR	IND	MIL	LAR
1	(Brazil) Corinthians	6	3	1	2	11	5	+6	10	Round of 16	—	1–2	0–1	2–0
2	(Argentina) Independiente	6	3	1	2	6	4	+2	10	Round of 16	0–1	—	1–0	2–0
3	(Colombia) Millonarios	6	2	2	2	7	4	+3	8	Copa Sudamericana	0–0	1–1	—	4–0
4	(Venezuela) Deportivo Lara	6	2	0	4	5	16	−11	6		2–7	1–0	2–1	—

Source: CONMEBOL

=== Group H ===
Pos	Team	Pld	W	D	L	GF	GA	GD	Pts	Qualification	PAL	BOC	JUN	ALI
1	(Brazil) Palmeiras	6	5	1	0	14	3	+11	16	Round of 16	—	1–1	3–1	2–0
2	(Argentina) Boca Juniors	6	2	3	1	8	4	+4	9	Round of 16	0–2	—	1–0	5–0
3	(Colombia) Junior	6	2	1	3	5	8	−3	7	Copa Sudamericana	0–3	1–1	—	1–0
4	(Peru) Alianza Lima	6	0	1	5	1	13	−12	1		1–3	0–0	0–2	—

Source: CONMEBOL

== Final stages ==
Starting from the round of 16, the teams played a single-elimination tournament with the following rules:

- Each tie was played on a home-and-away two-legged basis, with the higher-seeded team hosting the second leg (Regulations Article 23).
- In the round of 16, quarter-finals, and semi-finals, if tied on aggregate, the away goals rule was used. If still tied, extra time was not played, and a penalty shoot-out was used to determine the winner (Regulations Article 29).
- In the finals, if tied on aggregate, the away goals rule was not used, and 30 minutes of extra time were played. If still tied after extra time, a penalty shoot-out was used to determine the winner (Regulations Article 30).

=== Seeding ===
Starting from the round of 16, the teams were seeded according to their results in the group stage, with the group winners (Pot 1 in round of 16 draw) seeded 1–8, and the group runners-up (Pot 2 in round of 16 draw) seeded 9–16.

Seed	Grp	Team	Pld	W	D	L	GF	GA	GD	Pts	Round of 16 draw
1	H	(Brazil) Palmeiras	6	5	1	0	14	3	+11	16	Pot 1
2	A	(Brazil) Grêmio	6	4	2	0	13	2	+11	14	Pot 1
3	C	(Paraguay) Libertad	6	4	1	1	10	4	+6	13	Pot 1
4	D	(Argentina) River Plate	6	3	3	0	6	3	+3	12	Pot 1
5	E	(Brazil) Cruzeiro	6	3	2	1	15	5	+10	11	Pot 1
6	G	(Brazil) Corinthians	6	3	1	2	11	5	+6	10	Pot 1
7	B	(Colombia) Atlético Nacional	6	3	1	2	9	3	+6	10	Pot 1
8	F	(Brazil) Santos	6	3	1	2	6	4	+2	10	Pot 1
9	A	(Paraguay) Cerro Porteño	6	4	1	1	8	8	0	13	Pot 2
10	E	(Argentina) Racing	6	3	2	1	12	6	+6	11	Pot 2
11	D	(Brazil) Flamengo	6	2	4	0	7	4	+3	10	Pot 2
12	G	(Argentina) Independiente	6	3	1	2	6	4	+2	10	Pot 2
13	C	(Argentina) Atlético Tucumán	6	3	1	2	7	6	+1	10	Pot 2
14	H	(Argentina) Boca Juniors	6	2	3	1	8	4	+4	9	Pot 2
15	F	(Argentina) Estudiantes	6	2	2	2	6	4	+2	8	Pot 2
16	B	(Chile) Colo-Colo	6	2	2	2	5	5	0	8	Pot 2

Source: CONMEBOL
Rules for classification: 1) Higher position in group; 2) Points; 3) Goal difference; 4) Goals scored; 5) Away goals scored; 6) CONMEBOL ranking (Regulations Article 22.i).

=== Bracket ===
The bracket was decided based on the round of 16 draw, which was held on 4 June 2018.

Round of 16
14	(Argentina) Boca Juniors	2	4	6
3	(Paraguay) Libertad	0	2	2
11	(Brazil) Flamengo	0	1	1
5	(Brazil) Cruzeiro	2	0	2
16	(Chile) Colo-Colo (a)	1	1	2
6	(Brazil) Corinthians	0	2	2
9	(Paraguay) Cerro Porteño	0	1	1
1	(Brazil) Palmeiras	2	0	2
12	(Argentina) Independiente	3	0	3
8	(Brazil) Santos	0	0	0
10	(Argentina) Racing	0	0	0
4	(Argentina) River Plate	0	3	3
13	(Argentina) Atlético Tucumán	2	0	2
7	(Colombia) Atlético Nacional	0	1	1
15	(Argentina) Estudiantes	2	1	3 (3)
2	(Brazil) Grêmio (p)	1	2	3 (5)

Quarter-finals
14	(Argentina) Boca Juniors	2	1	3
5	(Brazil) Cruzeiro	0	1	1
16	(Chile) Colo-Colo	0	0	0
1	(Brazil) Palmeiras	2	2	4
12	(Argentina) Independiente	0	1	1
4	(Argentina) River Plate	0	3	3
13	(Argentina) Atlético Tucumán	0	0	0
2	(Brazil) Grêmio	2	4	6

Semi-finals
14	(Argentina) Boca Juniors	2	2	4
1	(Brazil) Palmeiras	0	2	2
4	(Argentina) River Plate (a)	0	2	2
2	(Brazil) Grêmio	1	1	2

Finals
14	(Argentina) Boca Juniors	2	1	3
4	(Argentina) River Plate	2	3	5

=== Round of 16 ===
Team 1	Agg.	Team 2	1st leg	2nd leg
Racing (Argentina)	0–3	(Argentina) River Plate	0–0	0–3
Colo-Colo (Chile)	2–2 (a)	(Brazil) Corinthians	1–0	1–2
Flamengo (Brazil)	1–2	(Brazil) Cruzeiro	0–2	1–0
Estudiantes (Argentina)	3–3 (3–5 p)	(Brazil) Grêmio	2–1	1–2
Atlético Tucumán (Argentina)	2–1	(Colombia) Atlético Nacional	2–0	0–1
Boca Juniors (Argentina)	6–2	(Paraguay) Libertad	2–0	4–2
Cerro Porteño (Paraguay)	1–2	(Brazil) Palmeiras	0–2	1–0
Independiente (Argentina)	3–0	(Brazil) Santos	3–0	0–0

Notes

1. CONMEBOL awarded Independiente a 3–0 win as a result of Santos fielding the ineligible player Carlos Sánchez. The match originally ended 0–0.
2. Match abandoned after 81 minutes due to crowd trouble, with the score 0–0 at the time.

=== Quarter-finals ===
Team 1	Agg.	Team 2	1st leg	2nd leg
Independiente (Argentina)	1–3	(Argentina) River Plate	0–0	1–3
Colo-Colo (Chile)	0–4	(Brazil) Palmeiras	0–2	0–2
Boca Juniors (Argentina)	3–1	(Brazil) Cruzeiro	2–0	1–1
Atlético Tucumán (Argentina)	0–6	(Brazil) Grêmio	0–2	0–4

=== Semi-finals ===
Team 1	Agg.	Team 2	1st leg	2nd leg
River Plate (Argentina)	2–2 (a)	(Brazil) Grêmio	0–1	2–1
Boca Juniors (Argentina)	4–2	(Brazil) Palmeiras	2–0	2–2

=== Finals ===
11 November 2018 (Note: The Boca Juniors v River Plate match, originally scheduled on 10 November 2018, 17:00 UTC−3, was postponed to the following day due to a waterlogged pitch.)
16:00 UTC−3

Boca Juniors (Argentina)	2–2	(Argentina) River Plate
Ábila 34'; Benedetto 45+1'	Report	Pratto 35'; Izquierdoz 61' (o.g.)

Estadio Alberto J. Armando, Buenos Aires
Attendance: 49,000
Referee: Roberto Tobar (Chile)

9 December 2018 (Note: The River Plate v Boca Juniors match, originally scheduled on 24 November 2018, 17:00 UTC−3, was postponed to 9 December 2018 due to an attack on the Boca Juniors team bus when several players were injured.)
20:30 UTC+1

River Plate (Argentina)	3–1 (a.e.t.)	(Argentina) Boca Juniors
Pratto 68'; Quintero 109'; G. Martínez 120+2'	Report	Benedetto 44'

Santiago Bernabéu Stadium, Madrid (Note: The River Plate v Boca Juniors match, originally scheduled to be hosted by River Plate at the Estadio Monumental Antonio Vespucio Liberti, Buenos Aires, took place in Spain at the Santiago Bernabéu Stadium, Madrid due to safety concerns.)
Attendance: 62,282
Referee: Andrés Cunha (Uruguay)

River Plate won 5–3 on aggregate.

== Statistics ==
=== Top scorers ===
Rank	Player	Team	1Q1	1Q2	2Q1	2Q2	3Q1	3Q2	GS1	GS2	GS3	GS4	GS5	GS6	⅛F1	⅛F2	QF1	QF2	SF1	SF2	F1	F2	Total
1	(Colombia) Miguel Borja	(Brazil) Palmeiras							1	1			1	3	2			1					9
1	(Colombia) Wilson Morelo	(Colombia) Santa Fe			2		2	2	1		1			1									9
3	(Brazil) Jádson	(Brazil) Corinthians								x	1	1	3			1							6
4	(Argentina) Ramón Ábila	(Argentina) Boca Juniors							x					2	1	x	x			1	1		5
4	(Argentina) Darío Benedetto	(Argentina) Boca Juniors							x	x	x	x	x	x	x			x	2	1	1	1	5
4	(Paraguay) Óscar Cardozo	(Paraguay) Libertad							x	x	1		2			2							5
4	(Brazil) Éverton	(Brazil) Grêmio								1		2	x	x	x	1	1		x				5
4	(Argentina) Lautaro Martínez	(Argentina) Racing							3		1	1											5
4	(Argentina) Lucas Pratto	(Argentina) River Plate										1	1			1					1	1	5
4	(Brazil) Sassá	(Brazil) Cruzeiro							x			2	2		x	x	x	1					5
4	(Brazil) Thiago Neves	(Brazil) Cruzeiro										2	1	1	1								5

Source: CONMEBOL.com

=== Top assists ===
Rank	Player	Team	Assists
1	(Brazil) Egídio	(Brazil) Cruzeiro	6
2	(Argentina) Cristian Pavón	(Argentina) Boca Juniors	5
2	(Brazil) Serginho	(Bolivia) Jorge Wilstermann	5
4	(Colombia) Anderson Plata	(Colombia) Santa Fe	4
4	(Brazil) Moisés	(Brazil) Palmeiras	4
6	(Brazil) Alisson	(Brazil) Grêmio	3
6	(Paraguay) Antonio Bareiro	(Paraguay) Libertad	3
6	(Argentina) Ricardo Centurión	(Argentina) Racing	3
6	(Colombia) Yimmi Chará	(Colombia) Junior	3
6	(Brazil) Luan	(Brazil) Grêmio	3
6	(Argentina) Gonzalo Martínez	(Argentina) River Plate	3
6	(Argentina) Pablo Pérez	(Argentina) Boca Juniors	3
6	(Colombia) Sebastián Villa	(Argentina) Boca Juniors	3
6	(Uruguay) Matías Zunino	(Uruguay) Nacional	3

Source: CONMEBOL.com

=== Team of the tournament ===
Opta selected the following 11 players as the team of the tournament.

Position	Player	Team
Goalkeeper	(Argentina) Franco Armani	(Argentina) River Plate
Defenders	(Argentina) Gonzalo Montiel	(Argentina) River Plate
Defenders	(Brazil) Pedro Geromel	(Brazil) Grêmio
Defenders	(Argentina) Walter Kannemann	(Brazil) Grêmio
Defenders	(Brazil) Egídio	(Brazil) Cruzeiro
Midfielders	(Colombia) Wilmar Barrios	(Argentina) Boca Juniors
Midfielders	(Argentina) Leonardo Ponzio	(Argentina) River Plate
Midfielders	(Colombia) Juan Fernando Quintero	(Argentina) River Plate
Midfielders	(Brazil) Dudu	(Brazil) Palmeiras
Forwards	(Argentina) Lucas Pratto	(Argentina) River Plate
Forwards	(Argentina) Darío Benedetto	(Argentina) Boca Juniors
