= José Meza =

Venezuelan football player (born 1991)

Personal information
- Full name: José Alí Meza Draegertt
- Date of birth: 17 April 1991 (age 35)
- Place of birth: Ciudad Bolívar, Venezuela
- Height: 1.71 m (5 ft 7 1/2 in)
- Position: Forward

Team information
- Current team: Deportivo La Guaira
- Number: 17

Senior career*
Years	Team	Apps	(Gls)
2009–2013	Mineros de Guayana	65	(9)
2013–2016	Deportivo Táchira	84	(16)
2016	→ Feirense (loan)	14	(0)
2016–2018	Oriente Petrolero	65	(32)
2018–2020	Mamelodi Sundowns	25	(1)
2020–2021	Maritzburg United	19	(2)
2022	Always Ready	3	(0)
2022-2023	Maritzburg United	13	(3)
2024	Portuguesa	15	(4)
2024–	Deportivo La Guaira	57	(16)

International career^{‡}
2011	Venezuela U20	2	(1)
- * Club domestic league appearances and goals as of 10 March 2026 ‡ National team caps and goals as of 15:44, 11 January 2019 (UTC)

José Alí Meza Draegertt (born 17 April 1991) is a Venezuelan footballer who plays for Deportivo La Guaira.

== Career statistics ==
=== Club ===
As of 11 January 2019.

Club	Season	League			Cup		Continental		Other		Total	
Club	Season	Division	Apps	Goals	Apps	Goals	Apps	Goals	Apps	Goals	Apps	Goals
Mineros de Guayana	2009–10	Venezuelan Primera División	19	3	0	0	–		0	0	19	3
Mineros de Guayana	2010–11	Venezuelan Primera División	12	1	0	0	–		0	0	12	1
Mineros de Guayana	2011–12	Venezuelan Primera División	7	0	0	0	–		0	0	7	0
Mineros de Guayana	2012–13	Venezuelan Primera División	27	5	0	0	–		0	0	27	5
Mineros de Guayana	Total		65	9	0	0	0	0	0	0	65	9
Deportivo Táchira	2013–14	Venezuelan Primera División	32	8	0	0	–		0	0	32	8
Deportivo Táchira	2014–15	Venezuelan Primera División	31	1	0	0	0	0	0	0	31	1
Deportivo Táchira	2015	Venezuelan Primera División	18	7	1 (Note: Appearances in the Copa Venezuela)	0	0	0	0	0	17	1
Deportivo Táchira	2016	Venezuelan Primera División	3	0	0	0	0	0	0	0	3	0
Deportivo Táchira	Total		84	16	1	0	0	0	0	0	85	16
Feirense (loan)	2015–16	LigaPro	14	0	1 (Note: Appearances in the Taça da Liga)	0	–		0	0	15	0
Oriente Petrolero	2016–17	Liga de Fútbol Profesional Boliviano	53	24	0	0	0	0	0	0	32	8
Oriente Petrolero	2018	Bolivian Primera División	12	8	0	0	0	0	0	0	31	1
Oriente Petrolero	Total		65	32	0	0	0	0	0	0	65	32
Mamelodi Sundowns	2018–19	South African Premier Division	8	0	3 (Note: Appearances in the MTN 8)	0	0	0	0	0	11	0
Mamelodi Sundowns	2019-20	South African Premier Division										
Career total			236	57	5	0	4	0	0	0	241	57

== Honours ==
South African Premier Division

- Winner (2): 2018-19, 2019-20

Nedbank Cup

- Winner : 2019-20

Telkom Knockout

- Winner : 2019
