= Enzo Maidana =

Argentine footballer

Personal information
- Full name: Enzo Damián Maidana
- Date of birth: 13 January 1988 (age 38)
- Place of birth: San Miguel de Tucumán, Argentina
- Height: 1.87 m (6 ft 2 in)
- Position: Forward

Team information
- Current team: Aurora

Senior career*
| Years | Team | Apps | (Gls) |
| 2009 | Club UTA | | |
| 2010–2013 | Atlético Tucumán | 46 | (2) |
| 2011–2012 | → Juventud Antoniana (loan) | | |
| 2013 | Deportivo Pereira | 9 | (0) |
| 2014 | Rubio Ñu | 2 | (0) |
| 2014–2015 | Universitario Pando | 20 | (3) |
| 2015–2017 | Petrolero | 58 | (31) |
| 2017 | Incheon United | 6 | (1) |
| 2018 | Puerto Cabello | 13 | (9) |
| 2019 | Independiente del Valle | 6 | (0) |
| 2019 | Nacional Potosí | 19 | (13) |
| 2020–2021 | Alianza Universidad | 22 | (8) |
| 2022– | Aurora | 17 | (0) |
- * Club domestic league appearances and goals as of 14:53, 6 May 2020 (UTC)

Enzo Maidana (born 13 January 1988) is an Argentinian footballer, who plays for Peruvian club Alianza Universidad.

== Club career ==
On 27 July, he joined Incheon United.
