= Cristian Alessandrini =

Argentine footballer

Personal information
- Full name: Cristian Ernesto Alessandrini
- Date of birth: 27 May 1985 (age 41)
- Place of birth: Buenos Aires, Argentina
- Height: 1.88 m (6 ft 2 in)
- Position: Forward

Senior career*
Years	Team	Apps	(Gls)
2006–2012	Berazategui	118	(37)
2008	→ Unión San Felipe (loan)	9	(0)
2011	→ Cobreloa (loan)	2	(0)
2011	→ JJ Urquiza (loan)	37	(5)
2012–2013	San Miguel	35	(10)
2013–2014	Boyacá Chicó	18	(4)
2014	Argentino de Quilmes	9	(1)
2015	Carabobo	11	(5)
2015–2018	Nacional Potosí	71	(42)
2016	→ Once Caldas (loan)	8	(0)
2018	Atlético Venezuela	13	(7)
2018	Real Garcilaso	17	(1)
2019	San José	15	(1)
2020	Vida	11	(1)
- * Club domestic league appearances and goals

Cristian Ernesto Alessandrini (born 27 May 1985) is an Argentine footballer who plays as a forward.

== Career ==
While playing for Nacional Potosí, Alessandrini was one of the top goal-scorers in the Liga de Fútbol Profesional Boliviano.
