= Lucas Gaúcho =

Brazilian footballer (born 1991)

Personal information
- Full name: Lucas de Souza Gonçalves
- Date of birth: June 13, 1991 (age 35)
- Place of birth: Esteio, Brazil
- Height: 1.84 m (6 ft 0 in)
- Position: Striker

Team information
- Current team: St Joseph's
- Number: 7

Youth career
- 2000–2007: Internacional
- 2007–2008: São José-RS
- 2008–2010: São Paulo

Senior career*
Years	Team	Apps	(Gls)
2010–2011	São Paulo	5	(2)
2011	→ São Bernardo (Loan)	5	(0)
2011	Portuguesa	8	(1)
2012	Espanyol	0	(0)
2013	São José-RS	15	(3)
2013	BEC Tero Sasana	10	(3)
2014	Hải Phòng	6	(3)
2014–2015	Al-Shabab	17	(10)
2015–2016	Žalgiris	13	(2)
2016	Thespakusatsu Gunma	1	(0)
2017	Al-Shabab	22	(13)
2017	Bnei Sakhnin	9	(0)
2018–2019	Wilstermann	50	(18)
2019	→ Operário Ferroviário (Loan)	5	(1)
2019–2021	Al-Qadsia	26	(13)
2022	Atlético Sanluqueño	20	(3)
2023	Novo Hamburgo	8	(0)
2023	Independiente Petrolero	4	(0)
2024–	St Joseph's	31	(14)

International career
2009	Brazil U17		
2011	Brazil U20	9	(7)
- * Club domestic league appearances and goals as of 19:44, 3 May 2025 (UTC)

Lucas de Souza Gonçalves (born 13 June 1991), commonly known as Lucas Gaúcho, is a Brazilian professional footballer who plays as a striker for St Joseph's.

== Career ==
=== Brazil career ===
Lucas began his career on São Paulo youth categories. On 24 February 2011, he was loaned to São Bernardo, in a three-month deal.

In June, he signed with Portuguesa.

After six months in Lusa, his contract was rescinded.

=== RCD Espanyol ===
After the rescision, Lucas signed a 4-and-a-half contract with La Liga club Espanyol Barcelona, according to his Twitter.

=== BEC Tero Sasana ===
On 14 August 2013, he is first scored debut in match against TOT S.C. before won over 0-5.

=== St Joseph's ===
Lucas signed for St Joseph's of the Gibraltar Football League on 28 December 2023, with the transfer to go through upon the opening on the winter transfer window on 1 January 2024.

=== National career ===
He played for youth national teams under 18,19,20.

=== Club career statistics ===
Club	Season	Division	League		Cup		Continental		Other		Total	
Club	Season	Division	Apps	Goals	Apps	Goals	Apps	Goals	Apps	Goals	Apps	Goals
São Paulo	2010	Campeonato Brasileiro Série A	5	2	0	0	0	0	0	0	5	2
São Paulo	Total		5	2	0	0	0	0	0	0	5	2
São Bernardo	2011	Campeonato Paulista	4	0	0	0	0	0	0	0	4	0
São Bernardo	Total		4	0	0	0	0	0	0	0	4	0
Portuguesa	2011	Campeonato Brasileiro Série B	8	1	0	0	0	0	0	0	8	1
Portuguesa	Total		8	1	0	0	0	0	0	0	8	1
São José-RS	2012	Campeonato Gaúcho	15	3	0	0	0	0	0	0	15	3
São José-RS	Total		15	3	0	0	0	0	0	0	15	3
BEC Tero Sasana	2013	Thai Premier League	9	3	0	0	0	0	0	0	9	3
BEC Tero Sasana	Total		9	3	0	0	0	0	0	0	9	3
Hải Phòng	2014	V.League 1	6	3	0	0	0	0	0	0	6	3
Hải Phòng	Total		6	3	0	0	0	0	0	0	6	3
Al-Shabab	2014–15	Oman Professional League	-	10	-	4	0	0	0	0	-	14
Al-Shabab	Total		-	10	-	4	0	0	0	0	-	14
Career total			-	22	-	4	0	0	0	0	-	26

== Honours ==
Portuguesa

- Campeonato Brasileiro Série B: 2011
