= Rafa Pérez =

Colombian footballer (born 1990)

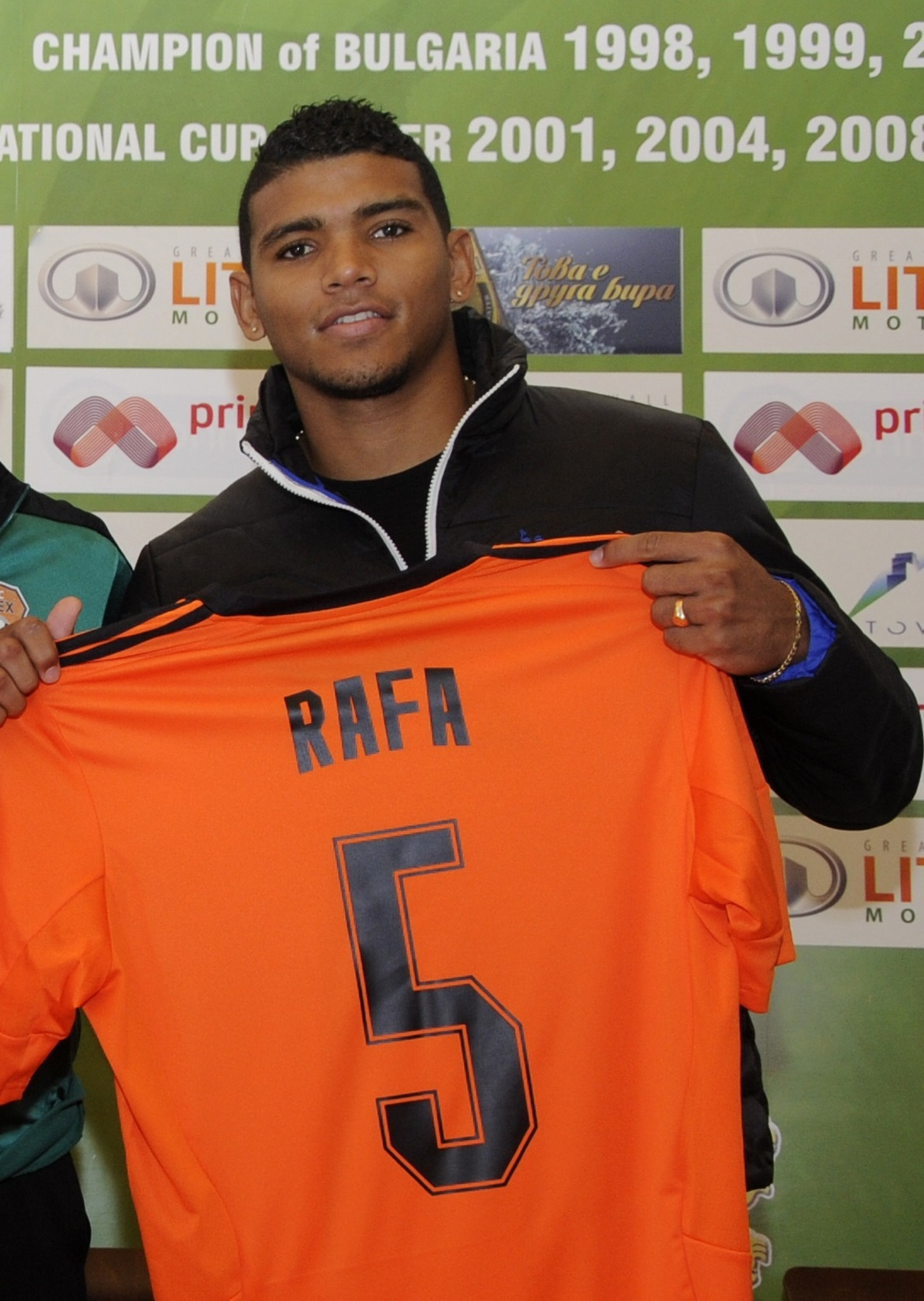
- Rafa Pérez in 2015

Personal information
- Full name: Rafael Enrique Pérez Almeida
- Date of birth: 9 January 1990 (age 36)
- Place of birth: Cartagena, Colombia
- Height: 1.86 m (6 ft 1 in)
- Position: Centre-back

Team information
- Current team: Atlético Junior
- Number: 5

Youth career
- Real Cartagena

Senior career*
Years	Team	Apps	(Gls)
2008–2011	Real Cartagena	68	(2)
2012	Chongqing	23	(1)
2013	Independiente Medellín	24	(2)
2014	Santa Fe	6	(0)
2014	Portuguesa	3	(0)
2015–2016	Litex Lovech	32	(1)
2016	Litex Lovech II	8	(0)
2016–2017	CSKA Sofia	16	(1)
2017–2020	Atlético Junior	125	(2)
2020–2023	Talleres	112	(2)
2023	San Lorenzo	53	(2)
2024–	Atlético Junior	6	(0)
- * Club domestic league appearances and goals

Rafael Enrique Pérez Almeida (born 9 January 1990), commonly known as Rafa Pérez (Latin American Spanish: [ˈrafa ˈpeɾes]; ), is a Colombian professional footballer who plays as a centre-back for Atlético Junior.

== Club career ==
=== Early career ===
Born in Cartagena, Pérez made his senior debuts with Real Cartagena in 2008. In 2012, he moved abroad, signing with China League One team Chongqing Lifan, but returned to his home country only a year later, after agreeing to a deal with Independiente Medellín.

On 12 December 2013 Pérez moved to Independiente Santa Fe. On 26 May of the following year he joined Portuguesa, but only appeared rarely for Lusa.

=== Litex Lovech ===
On 11 January 2015, Pérez signed with Bulgarian side Litex Lovech, being given the number 5 jersey. He made his debut for the club on 28 February, playing the full 90 minutes in a 1–0 home win against Ludogorets Razgrad. On 12 December 2015, he was sent off after an altercation with Miguel Bedoya in a heated league match that was eventually abandoned after the Litex players were ordered off the pitch.

=== CSKA Sofia ===
In the summer of 2016 he joined CSKA Sofia. Pérez remained with the "redmen" until he cancelled his contract with the team in May 2017.

=== Atlético Junior ===
On 2 June 2017, after Pérez had officially parted company with CSKA Sofia, he joined Atlético Junior.

== Honours ==
=== Club ===
Real Cartagena

- Primera B (1): 2008

Junior

- Categoría Primera A (2): 2018-I, 2019-I
- Copa Colombia (1): 2017
- Superliga Colombiana (1): 2019
