= Matías Zunino =

Uruguayan footballer (born 1990)

Personal information
- Full name: Paul Matías Zunino Escudero
- Date of birth: 20 April 1990 (age 36)
- Place of birth: Canelones, Uruguay
- Height: 1.76 m (5 ft 9 in)
- Position: Right midfielder

Team information
- Current team: Progreso de Atlántida

Youth career
- Danubio

Senior career*
Years	Team	Apps	(Gls)
2010–2015	Danubio	37	(1)
2014	→ Sud América (loan)	10	(0)
2015–2016	El Tanque Sisley	28	(2)
2016–2017	Defensor Sporting	45	(6)
2017–2019	Nacional	62	(12)
2020–2022	LDU Quito	35	(4)
2021–2022	→ Nacional (loan)	17	(3)
2023	Liverpool	6	(0)
2023–2024	Boston River	12	(1)
2024–	Progreso de Atlántida	0	(0)
- * Club domestic league appearances and goals as of 14 March 2024

Paul Matías Zunino Escudero (born 20 April 1990) is a Uruguayan footballer who plays as a midfielder for Progreso de Atlántida.

== Honours ==
LDU Quito

- Supercopa Ecuador: 2020
