= 2018 Cruzeiro EC season =

Cruzeiro
2018 season
- President: Wagner Pires de Sá
- Manager: Mano Menezes
- Stadium: Mineirão
- Série A: 8th
- Campeonato Mineiro: Winners
- Copa do Brasil: Winners
- Copa Libertadores: Quarter-finals
- Top goalscorer: League: De Arrascaeta (6); All: De Arrascaeta (15); Thiago Neves (15)
- Highest home attendance: 56,791 vs Boca Juniors (4 October, Copa Libertadores)
- Lowest home attendance: 4,036 vs Vitória (21 November, Série A)
- Average home league attendance: 19,373
- Biggest win: 7–0 vs Universidad de Chile (26 April, Copa Libertadores)
- Biggest defeat: 2–4 vs Racing (27 February, Copa Libertadores)
Home colours	Away colours	Third colours

The 2018 season was the 97th in the Cruzeiro Esporte Clube's existence. Along with the Campeonato Brasileiro Série A, the club also competed in the Campeonato Mineiro, the Copa do Brasil and the Copa Libertadores.

On 17 October, Cruzeiro won their 6th Copa do Brasil title after defeating Corinthians 2–1 at Arena Corinthians, becoming the biggest champions of the tournament history and the first to win it twice in a row.

== Competitions ==
=== Overview ===
Competition	First match	Last match	Starting round	Final position	Record							
Competition	First match	Last match	Starting round	Final position	Pld	W	D	L	GF	GA	GD	Win %
Campeonato Mineiro	17 January 2018	8 April 2018	Matchday 1	Winners	16	13	2	1	28	6	+22	81.25
Campeonato Brasileiro Série A	14 April 2018	2 December 2018	Round 1	8th	38	14	11	13	34	34	+0	36.84
Copa do Brasil	16 May 2018	17 October 2018	Round of 16	Winners	8	5	2	1	10	6	+4	62.50
Copa Libertadores	27 February 2018	4 October 2018	Group stage	Quarter-finals	10	4	3	3	18	9	+9	40.00
Total					72	36	18	18	90	55	+35	50.00

Source: Competitions

=== Campeonato Mineiro ===
==== First stage ====
Pos	Team	Pld	W	D	L	GF	GA	GD	Pts	Qualification or relegation
1	Cruzeiro	11	9	2	0	20	2	+18	29	Knockout stage
2	América Mineiro	11	6	3	2	14	8	+6	21	Knockout stage
3	Atlético Mineiro	11	5	3	3	14	7	+7	18	Knockout stage
4	Tupi	11	5	1	5	19	16	+3	16	Knockout stage
5	Tombense	11	4	3	4	8	7	+1	15	Knockout stage

Updated to match(es) played on 18 January 2018. Source:
Rules for classification: 1) points; 2) wins; 3) goal difference; 4) goals scored; 5) head-to-head results; 6) least red cards received; 7) least yellow cards received; 8) draw.

17 January 1	Cruzeiro	2–0	Tupi	Belo Horizonte
21:45 UTC−3	Robinho 53'; Rafinha 60'	Report		Stadium: Mineirão; Attendance: 42,484; Referee: Murilo Francisco Misson Júnior

20 January 2	Caldense	0–0	Cruzeiro	Poços de Caldas
21:30 UTC−3		Report		Stadium: Ronaldão; Attendance: 4,431; Referee: Igor Júnio Benevenuto

24 January 3	Cruzeiro	4–0	Uberlândia	Belo Horizonte
21:45 UTC−3	Rafael Estevam 59' (og.); Thiago Neves 42'; Rafinha 79', 84'	Report		Stadium: Mineirão; Attendance: 25,242; Referee: Emerson de Almeida Ferreira

27 January 4	Tombense	1–2	Cruzeiro	Ipatinga
19:00 UTC−3	Daniel Amorim 45'	Report	Fred 51'; Rafinha 75'	Stadium: Ipatingão; Attendance: 14,751; Referee: Cleisson Veloso Pereira

4 February 5	Cruzeiro	1–0	América Mineiro	Belo Horizonte
17:00 UTC−3	De Arrascaeta 68'	Report		Stadium: Mineirão; Attendance: 50,794; Referee: Wanderson Alves de Souza

9 February 6	Democrata GV	0–2	Cruzeiro	Governador Valadares
21:30 UTC−3		Report	Mancuello 16'; Marcelo Hermes 77'	Stadium: Mamudão; Attendance: 8,238; Referee: Antonio Márcio Teixeira da Silva

17 February 7	Cruzeiro	1–0	Villa Nova	Belo Horizonte
16:30 UTC−3	Rafinha 30'	Report		Stadium: Mineirão; Attendance: 31,705; Referee: Felipe Fernandes de Lima

24 February 8	Cruzeiro	3–0	Boa Esporte	Belo Horizonte
16:30 UTC−3	Rafael Sóbis 2', 86'; Mancuello 39'	Report		Stadium: Mineirão; Attendance: 17,671; Referee: Marco Aurélio Augusto Fazekas Ferreira

4 March 9	Atlético Mineiro	0–1	Cruzeiro	Belo Horizonte
11:00 UTC−3		Report	Raniel 47'	Stadium: Independência; Attendance: 22,196; Referee: Cleisson Veloso Pereira

7 March 10	Cruzeiro	3–0	URT	Belo Horizonte
21:45 UTC−3	Rafael Sóbis 18'; De Arrascaeta 23'; Thiago Neves 41'	Report		Stadium: Mineirão; Attendance: 22,962; Referee: Ronei Cândido Alves

11 March 11	Patrocinense	1–1	Cruzeiro	Patrocínio
17:00 UTC−3	Genesis 84'	Report	Rafael Marques 71'	Stadium: Pedro Alves do Nascimento; Attendance: 6,471; Referee: Emerson de Almeida Ferreira

==== Knockout phase ====
===== Quarter-final =====
17 March	Cruzeiro	2–0	Patrocinense	Belo Horizonte
16:00 UTC−3	Raniel 52', 64'	Report		Stadium: Mineirão; Attendance: 16,603; Referee: Ronei Cândido Alves

===== Semi-finals =====
21 March First leg	Tupi	0–1	Cruzeiro	Juiz de Fora
21:45 UTC−3		Report	Ariel Cabral 46'	Stadium: Mário Helênio; Attendance: 8,238; Referee: Wanderson Alves de Souza

25 March Second leg	Cruzeiro	2–1 (3–1 agg.)	Tupi	Belo Horizonte
19:00 UTC−3	Thiago Neves 16', 80'	Report	João Vitor 19'	Stadium: Mineirão; Attendance: 48,566; Referee: Wagner do Nascimento Magalhães

===== Final =====
1 April First leg	Atlético Mineiro	3–1	Cruzeiro	Belo Horizonte
16:00 UTC−3	Ricardo Oliveira 36', 45'; Adílson 41'	Report	De Arrascaeta 83'	Stadium: Independência; Attendance: 21,215; Referee: Dewson Fernando Freitas da Silva

8 April Second leg	Cruzeiro	2–0 (3–3 agg.)	Atlético Mineiro	Belo Horizonte
16:00 UTC−3	De Arrascaeta 3'; Thiago Neves 52'	Report		Stadium: Mineirão; Attendance: 49,906; Referee: Luiz Flávio de Oliveira
Note: Cruzeiro won the title with a draw on aggregate for being the best placed team in the first round.

=== Campeonato Brasileiro Série A ===
==== League table ====
Pos	Team	Pld	W	D	L	GF	GA	GD	Pts	Qualification or relegation
6	Atlético Mineiro	38	17	8	13	56	43	+13	59	Qualification for Copa Libertadores second stage
7	Atlético Paranaense	38	16	9	13	54	37	+17	57	Qualification for Copa Libertadores group stage (Note: Atlético Paranaense qualified for the Copa Libertadores group stage by winning the 2018 Copa Sudamericana.)
8	Cruzeiro	38	14	11	13	34	34	0	53	Qualification for Copa Libertadores group stage (Note: Cruzeiro qualified for the Copa Libertadores group stage by winning the 2018 Copa do Brasil.)
9	Botafogo	38	13	12	13	38	46	−8	51	Qualification for Copa Sudamericana first stage
10	Santos	38	13	11	14	46	40	+6	50	Qualification for Copa Sudamericana first stage

Source: CBF
Rules for classification: 1) points; 2) wins; 3) goal difference; 4) goals scored; 5) head-to-head results; 6) least red cards received; 7) least yellow cards received; 8) draw.

==== Results by round ====
Round	1	2	3	4	5	6	7	8	9	10	11	12	13	14	15	16	17	18	19	20	21	22	23	24	25	26	27	28	29	30	31	32	33	34	35	36	37	38
Ground	H	A	A	H	H	A	A	H	A	H	A	A	H	H	A	H	A	A	H	A	H	H	A	A	H	H	A	H	A	H	H	A	A	H	A	H	H	A
Result	L	L	D	W	W	L	W	W	W	D	L	D	W	W	L	L	D	L	D	D	W	D	D	D	D	W	L	L	L	W	W	W	L	W	L	W	L	D
Position	16	19	18	14	8	13	10	7	2	5	8	8	6	4	6	8	8	8	8	7	7	7	7	7	7	7	7	9	10	10	9	8	9	7	8	8	8	8

Updated to match(es) played on 8 December 2018. Source: Matches
A = Away; H = Home; W = Win; D = Draw; L = Loss

==== Matches ====
14 April 1	Cruzeiro	0–1	Grêmio	Belo Horizonte
16:00 UTC−3		Report	André 54'	Stadium: Mineirão; Attendance: 19,285; Referee: Rodolpho Toski Marques

22 April 2	Fluminense	1–0	Cruzeiro	Rio de Janeiro
16:00 UTC−3	Pedro 48'	Report		Stadium: Maracanã; Attendance: 10,016; Referee: Flávio Rodrigues de Souza

29 April 3	Internacional	0–0	Cruzeiro	Porto Alegre
19:00 UTC−3		Report		Stadium: Beira-Rio; Attendance: 20,513; Referee: Wagner do Nascimento Magalhães

6 May 4	Cruzeiro	1–0	Botafogo	Belo Horizonte
16:00 UTC−3	Dedé 71'	Report		Stadium: Mineirão; Attendance: 20,908; Referee: Leandro Bizzio Marinho

13 May 5	Cruzeiro	2–0	Sport	Belo Horizonte
11:00 UTC−3	Dedé 45+1'; De Arrascaeta 54'	Report		Stadium: Mineirão; Attendance: 21,907; Referee: Bruno Arleu de Araújo

19 May 6	Atlético Mineiro	1–0	Cruzeiro	Belo Horizonte
16:00 UTC−3	Róger Guedes 61'	Report		Stadium: Independência; Attendance: 15,384; Referee: Raphael Claus

27 May 7	Santos	0–1	Cruzeiro	São Paulo
16:00 UTC−3		Report	Bruno Silva 75'	Stadium: Pacaembu; Attendance: 10,670; Referee: Paulo Roberto Alves Júnior

30 May 8	Cruzeiro	1–0	Palmeiras	Belo Horizonte
21:45 UTC−3	Rafael Sóbis 68'	Report		Stadium: Mineirão; Attendance: 19,679; Referee: Bráulio da Silva Machado

3 June 9	Ceará	0–1	Cruzeiro	Fortaleza
19:00 UTC−3		Report	Sassá 18'	Stadium: Castelão; Attendance: 15,234; Referee: Rodrigo Carvalhaes de Miranda

6 June 10	Cruzeiro	1–1	Vasco da Gama	Belo Horizonte
21:45 UTC−3	Raniel 60'	Report	Andrey 21'	Stadium: Mineirão; Attendance: 23,725; Referee: Luiz Flávio de Oliveira

9 June 11	Chapecoense	2–0	Cruzeiro	Chapecó
19:00 UTC−3	Bruno Silva 79'; Elicarlos 90+4'	Report		Stadium: Arena Condá; Attendance: 6,637; Referee: Grazianni Maciel Rocha

13 June 12	Paraná	1–1	Cruzeiro	Curitiba
19:30 UTC−3	Silvinho 75'	Report	Rafael Sóbis 64' (pen.)	Stadium: Vila Capanema; Attendance: 5,131; Referee: Dewson Fernandes Freitas da Silva

19 July 13	Cruzeiro	3–1	América Mineiro	Belo Horizonte
19:30 UTC−3	De Arrascaeta 34'; Robinho 59'; Raniel 64'	Report	Christian 31'	Stadium: Mineirão; Attendance: 17,958; Referee: Raphael Claus

22 July 14	Cruzeiro	2–1	Athletico Paranaense	Belo Horizonte
19:00 UTC−3	De Arrascaeta 65'; Barcos 80'	Report	Guilherme 39' (pen.)	Stadium: Mineirão; Attendance: 15,023; Referee: Jean Pierre Gonçalves Lima

25 July 15	Corinthians	2–0	Cruzeiro	São Paulo
21:45 UTC−3	Ángel Romero 61', 79'	Report		Stadium: Arena Corinthians; Attendance: 21,031; Referee: Paulo Roberto Alves Júnior

29 July 16	Cruzeiro	0–2	São Paulo	Belo Horizonte
16:00 UTC−3		Report	Diego Souza 26'; Éverton 76'	Stadium: Mineirão; Attendance: 26,671; Referee: Wagner do Nascimento Magalhães

5 August 17	Vitória	1–1	Cruzeiro	Salvador
16:00 UTC−3	Neilton 72' (pen.)	Report	Manoel 75'	Stadium: Barradão; Attendance: 7,193; Referee: Eduardo Tomaz de Aquino Valadão

12 August 18	Flamengo	1–0	Cruzeiro	Rio de Janeiro
16:00 UTC−3	Henrique Dourado 22'	Report		Stadium: Maracanã; Attendance: 55,276; Referee: Dewson Fernando Freitas da Silva

19 August 19	Cruzeiro	1–1	Bahia	Belo Horizonte
16:00 UTC−3	Thiago Neves 63'	Report	Douglas Grolli 59'	Stadium: Mineirão; Attendance: 28,807; Referee: Bruno Arleu de Araújo

22 August 20	Grêmio	1–1	Cruzeiro	Porto Alegre
21:45 UTC−3	Everton 59'	Report	Bruno Silva 44'	Stadium: Arena do Grêmio; Attendance: 12,773; Referee: Marcelo de Lima Henrique

25 August 21	Cruzeiro	2–1	Fluminense	Belo Horizonte
21:00 UTC−3	Raniel 14'; Ayrton Lucas 72' (o.g.)	Report	Henrique 26' (o.g.)	Stadium: Mineirão; Attendance: 14,449; Referee: Rafael Traci

2 September 22	Cruzeiro	0–0	Internacional	Belo Horizonte
19:00 UTC−3		Report		Stadium: Mineirão; Attendance: 16,247; Referee: Wilton Pereira Sampaio

5 September 23	Botafogo	1–1	Cruzeiro	Rio de Janeiro
19:30 UTC−3	Luiz Fernando 10'	Report	Edilson 37'	Stadium: Engenhão; Attendance: 5,779; Referee: Raphael Claus

8 September 24	Sport	0–0	Cruzeiro	Recife
16:00 UTC−3		Report		Stadium: Ilha do Retiro; Attendance: 9,525; Referee: Vinicius Gonçalves Dias Araújo

16 September 25	Cruzeiro	0–0	Atlético Mineiro	Belo Horizonte
16:00 UTC−3		Report		Stadium: Mineirão; Attendance: 24,999; Referee: Rafael Traci

23 September 26	Cruzeiro	2–1	Santos	Belo Horizonte
19:00 UTC−3	Sassá 46'; Raniel 83'	Report	Gabriel 15'	Stadium: Mineirão; Attendance: 9,029; Referee: Bráulio da Silva Machado

30 September 27	Palmeiras	3–1	Cruzeiro	São Paulo
11:00 UTC−3	Lucas Lima 22'; Hyoran 42'; Gustavo Gómez 65'	Report	Mancuello 30' (pen.)	Stadium: Pacaembu; Attendance: 35,674; Referee: Dewson Fernando Freitas da Silva

14 October 29	Vasco da Gama	2–0	Cruzeiro	Rio de Janeiro
16:00 UTC−3	Yago Pikachu 48'; Maxi López 70'	Report		Stadium: São Januário; Attendance: 11,376; Referee: Marcelo Aparecido Ribeiro de Souza

21 October 30	Cruzeiro	3–0	Chapecoense	Belo Horizonte
19:00 UTC−3	Thiago Neves 21'; De Arrascaeta 29'; Dedé 43'	Report		Stadium: Independência; Attendance: 12,666; Referee: Raphael Claus

24 October 28	Cruzeiro	0–2	Ceará	Belo Horizonte
19:30 UTC−3		Report	Arthur 17', 80'	Stadium: Mineirão; Attendance: 30,814; Referee: Flávio Rodrigues de Souza
Note: The match was rescheduled from 6 October to 24 October due to Cruzeiro's clash against Boca Juniors for the Copa Libertadores on 4 October.

27 October 31	Cruzeiro	3–1	Paraná	Belo Horizonte
21:30 UTC−3	De Arrascaeta 9'; Fred 15'; Rafael Sóbis 47' (pen.)	Report	Egídio 20' (o.g.)	Stadium: Mineirão; Attendance: 18,755; Referee: Marcelo de Lima Henrique

4 November 32	América Mineiro	1–2	Cruzeiro	Belo Horizonte
17:00 UTC−3	Rafael Moura 70' (pen.)	Report	De Arrascaeta 17'; Thiago Neves 49' (pen.)	Stadium: Independência; Attendance: 9,423; Referee: Héber Roberto Lopes

10 November 33	Athletico Paranaense	2–0	Cruzeiro	Curitiba
19:00 UTC−3	Marcelo Cirino 9'; Raphael Veiga 21'	Report		Stadium: Arena da Baixada; Attendance: 7,720; Referee: Anderson Daronco

14 November 34	Cruzeiro	1–0	Corinthians	Belo Horizonte
21:45 UTC−3	David 13'	Report		Stadium: Mineirão; Attendance: 15,520; Referee: Jean Pierre Gonçalves Lima

18 November 35	São Paulo	1–0	Cruzeiro	São Paulo
19:00 UTC−3	Diego Souza 30'	Report		Stadium: Morumbi; Attendance: 14,058; Referee: Héber Roberto Lopes

21 November 36	Cruzeiro	3–0	Vitória	Belo Horizonte
21:45 UTC−3	Aderllan 43' (o.g.); Fred 54' (pen.), 71'	Report		Stadium: Mineirão; Attendance: 4,036; Referee: Leandro Bizzio Marinho

25 November 37	Cruzeiro	0–2	Flamengo	Belo Horizonte
17:00 UTC−3		Report	Éverton Ribeiro 8', 53'	Stadium: Mineirão; Attendance: 27,616; Referee: Jean Pierre Gonçalves Lima

2 December 38	Bahia	0–0	Cruzeiro	Salvador, Bahia
17:00 UTC−3		Report		Stadium: Pituaçu; Attendance: 27,776; Referee: Bruno Arleu de Araújo

=== Copa do Brasil ===
As Cruzeiro participated in the 2018 Copa Libertadores, the club entered the Copa do Brasil in the round of 16, whose draw was held on 20 April.

==== Round of 16 ====
16 May First leg	Athletico Paranaense	1–2	Cruzeiro	Curitiba
21:45 UTC−3	Carleto 41'	Report	Henrique 79'; Raniel 90+2'	Stadium: Arena da Baixada; Attendance: 10,327; Referee: Péricles Bassols

16 July Second leg	Cruzeiro	1–1 (3–2 agg.)	Athletico Paranaense	Belo Horizonte
20:00 UTC−3	De Arrascaeta 86'	Report	Bergson 90+1'	Stadium: Mineirão; Attendance: 44,443; Referee: Leandro Pedro Vuaden

==== Quarter-finals ====
1 August First leg	Santos	0–1	Cruzeiro	Santos
19:30 UTC−3		Report	Raniel 81'	Stadium: Vila Belmiro; Attendance: 7,134; Referee: Wilton Pereira Sampaio

15 August Second leg	Cruzeiro	1–2 (2–2 agg.) (3–0 p)	Santos	Belo Horizonte
19:30 UTC−3	Thiago Neves 12'	Report	Gabriel 42'; Bruno Henrique 83'	Stadium: Mineirão; Attendance: 49,513; Referee: Rodolpho Toski Marques
	Penalties
	Lucas Silva (penalty scored); Raniel (penalty scored); David (penalty scored)		(penalty missed) Bruno Henrique; (penalty missed) Rodrygo; (penalty missed) Jean Mota

==== Semi-finals ====
12 September First leg	Palmeiras	0–1	Cruzeiro	São Paulo
21:45 UTC−3		Report	Barcos 5'	Stadium: Allianz Parque; Attendance: 32,960; Referee: Wagner Reway

26 September Second leg	Cruzeiro	1–1 (2–1 agg.)	Palmeiras	Belo Horizonte
21:45 UTC−3	Barcos 26'	Report	Felipe Melo 49'	Stadium: Mineirão; Attendance: 44,681; Referee: Wagner do Nascimento Magalhães

==== Final ====
10 October First leg	Cruzeiro	1–0	Corinthians	Belo Horizonte
21:45 UTC−3	Thiago Neves 45'	Report		Stadium: Mineirão; Attendance: 53,368; Referee: Anderson Daronco

17 October Second leg	Corinthians	1–2 (1–3 agg.)	Cruzeiro	São Paulo
19:30 UTC−3	Jádson 54' (pen.)	Report	Robinho 27'; De Arrascaeta 81'	Stadium: Arena Corinthians; Attendance: 45,978; Referee: Wagner do Nascimento Magalhães

=== Copa Libertadores ===
The group stage draw for the 2018 Copa Libertadores was made on 20 December 2017. Cruzeiro were drawn into Group E with Universidad de Chile, Racing and Vasco da Gama.

==== Group stage ====
Pos	Team	Pld	W	D	L	GF	GA	GD	Pts	Qualification	CRU	RAC	VAS	UCH
1	(Brazil) Cruzeiro	6	3	2	1	15	5	+10	11	Round of 16	—	2–1	0–0	7–0
2	(Argentina) Racing	6	3	2	1	12	6	+6	11	Round of 16	4–2	—	4–0	1–0
3	(Brazil) Vasco da Gama	6	1	2	3	3	10	−7	5	Copa Sudamericana	0–4	1–1	—	0–1
4	Universidad de Chile	6	1	2	3	2	11	−9	5		0–0	1–1	0–2	—

Source: CONMEBOL
Rules for classification: Group stage tiebreakers

27 February 1	Racing (Argentina)	4–2	(Brazil) Cruzeiro	Buenos Aires, Argentina
21:30 UTC−4	Lautaro Martínez 14', 45', 63'; Solari 77'		De Arrascaeta 30'; Robinho 70'	Stadium: El Cilindro; Attendance: 35,920; Referee: Wilmar Roldán (Colombia)

4 April 2	Cruzeiro (Brazil)	0–0	(Brazil) Vasco da Gama	Belo Horizonte, Brazil
21:45 UTC−3				Stadium: Mineirão; Attendance: 38,019; Referee: Raphael Claus (Brazil)

19 April 3	Universidad de Chile	0–0	(Brazil) Cruzeiro	Santiago, Chile
21:30 UTC−5				Stadium: Estadio Nacional; Attendance: 45,084; Referee: Víctor Hugo Carrillo (Peru)

26 April 4	Cruzeiro (Brazil)	7–0	Universidad de Chile	Belo Horizonte, Brazil
19:15 UTC−4	Thiago Neves 10', 75'; Rafinha 18'; Sassá 44' (pen.), 62'; De Arrascaeta 54'; Rafael Sóbis 81'			Stadium: Mineirão; Attendance: 34,147; Referee: Roddy Zambrano (Ecuador)

2 May 5	Vasco da Gama (Brazil)	0–4	(Brazil) Cruzeiro	Rio de Janeiro, Brazil
21:45 UTC−3			Léo 10'; Thiago Neves 25'; Sassá 33', 55'	Stadium: São Januário; Attendance: 12,973; Referee: Anderson Daronco (Brazil)

22 May 6	Cruzeiro (Brazil)	2–1	(Argentina) Racing	Belo Horizonte, Brazil
21:30 UTC−3	Thiago Neves 3'; Lucas Silva 11'		Centurión 28'	Stadium: Mineirão; Attendance: 43,276; Referee: Andrés Rojas (Colombia)

==== Knockout stage ====
The draw for the knockout stages of the Copa Libertadores was held on 4 June.

===== Round of 16 =====
8 August First leg	Flamengo (Brazil)	0–2	(Brazil) Cruzeiro	Rio de Janeiro, Brazil
21:45 UTC−4			De Arrascaeta 10'; Thiago Neves 78'	Stadium: Maracanã; Attendance: 45,967; Referee: Néstor Pitana (Argentina)

29 August Second leg	Cruzeiro (Brazil)	0–1 (2–1 agg.)	(Brazil) Flamengo	Belo Horizonte, Brazil
21:45 UTC−3		Report	Léo Duarte 70'	Stadium: Mineirão; Attendance: 52,706; Referee: Andrés Cunha (Uruguay)

===== Quarter-finals =====
19 September First leg	Boca Juniors (Argentina)	2–0	(Brazil) Cruzeiro	Buenos Aires, Argentina
21:45 UTC−4	Zárate 36'; Pablo Pérez 82'			Stadium: La Bombonera; Attendance: 50,000; Referee: Eber Aquino (Paraguay)

4 October Second leg	Cruzeiro (Brazil)	1–1 (1–3 agg.)	(Argentina) Boca Juniors	Belo Horizonte, Brazil
21:45 UTC−3	Sassá 58'		Pavón 90+4'	Stadium: Mineirão; Attendance: 56,791; Referee: Andrés Cunha (Uruguay)
