= 2018 Copa Libertadores group stage =

The 2018 Copa Libertadores group stage was played from 27 February to 24 May 2018. A total of 32 teams competed in the group stage to decide the 16 places in the final stages of the 2018 Copa Libertadores.

== Draw ==
The draw for the group stage was held on 20 December 2017, 20:00 PYST (UTC−3), at the CONMEBOL Convention Centre in Luque, Paraguay.

Teams were seeded by their CONMEBOL ranking of the Copa Libertadores (shown in parentheses), taking into account of the following three factors:

1. Performance in the last 10 years, taking into account Copa Libertadores results in the period 2008–2017
2. Historical coefficient, taking into account Copa Libertadores results in the period 1960–2007
3. Local tournament champion, with bonus points awarded to domestic league champions of the last 10 years

For the group stage, the 32 teams were drawn into eight groups (Groups A–H, also denoted as Groups 1–8) of four containing a team from each of the four pots. Teams from the same association could not be drawn into the same group, excluding the winners of the third stage, which were allocated to Pot 4 and whose identity was not known at the time of the draw, and could be drawn into the same group with another team from the same association.

Group stage draw
Pot 1	Pot 2	Pot 3	Pot 4
(Brazil) Grêmio (3); (Argentina) River Plate (1); (Argentina) Boca Juniors (2); (Colombia) Atlético Nacional (4); (Uruguay) Peñarol (6); (Brazil) Santos (11); (Brazil) Corinthians (12); (Brazil) Cruzeiro (13)	(Argentina) Independiente (31); (Ecuador) Emelec (14); (Argentina) Estudiantes (17); (Paraguay) Cerro Porteño (18); (Brazil) Palmeiras (22); (Bolivia) Bolívar (23); (Paraguay) Libertad (24); Universidad de Chile (25)	(Bolivia) The Strongest (26); (Chile) Colo-Colo (27); (Argentina) Racing (33); (Brazil) Flamengo (35); (Uruguay) Defensor Sporting (36); (Peru) Alianza Lima (58); (Colombia) Millonarios (65); (Peru) Real Garcilaso (68)	(Argentina) Atlético Tucumán (88); (Venezuela) Deportivo Lara (105); (Ecuador) Delfín (206); (Venezuela) Monagas (207); Third stage winner G1; Third stage winner G2; Third stage winner G3; Third stage winner G4

Notes

1. ^{†} Defending Copa Libertadores champion, automatically seeded into Pot 1 and allocated to Group A in the group stage draw.
2. ^{‡} Defending Copa Sudamericana champion, automatically seeded into Pot 2 in the group stage draw.

The following were the four winners of the third stage of qualifying which joined the 28 direct entrants in the group stage.

Match	Third stage winners
G1	(Colombia) Santa Fe (21)
G2	(Uruguay) Nacional (5)
G3	(Brazil) Vasco da Gama (54)
G4	(Colombia) Junior (60)

== Format ==
In the group stage, each group was played on a home-and-away round-robin basis. The teams were ranked according to points (3 points for a win, 1 point for a draw, and 0 points for a loss). If tied on points, the following criteria were used to determine the ranking: 1. Goal difference; 2. Goals scored; 3. Away goals scored; 4. CONMEBOL ranking (Regulations Article 28).

The winners and runners-up of each group advanced to the round of 16 of the knockout stages. The third-placed teams of each group entered the Copa Sudamericana second stage.

== Groups ==
The fixture list was determined by the draw as follows:

- Round 1: Team 3 vs. Team 1, Team 4 vs. Team 2
- Round 2: Team 1 vs. Team 4, Team 2 vs. Team 3
- Round 3: Team 2 vs. Team 1, Team 3 vs. Team 4
- Round 4: Team 1 vs. Team 2, Team 4 vs. Team 3
- Round 5: Team 4 vs. Team 1, Team 3 vs. Team 2
- Round 6: Team 1 vs. Team 3, Team 2 vs. Team 4

The matches were played on 27–28 February, 1, 13–15 March, 3–5, 11, 17–19, 24–26 April, 1–3, 15–17 and 22–24 May 2018.

=== Group A ===
Pos	Team	Pld	W	D	L	GF	GA	GD	Pts	Qualification	GRE	CPO	DEF	MON
1	(Brazil) Grêmio	6	4	2	0	13	2	+11	14	Round of 16	—	5–0	1–0	4–0
2	(Paraguay) Cerro Porteño	6	4	1	1	8	8	0	13	Round of 16	0–0	—	2–1	3–2
3	(Uruguay) Defensor Sporting	6	1	1	4	5	7	−2	4	Copa Sudamericana	1–1	0–1	—	3–1
4	(Venezuela) Monagas	6	1	0	5	5	14	−9	3		1–2	0–2	1–0	—

Source: CONMEBOL
27 February 2018
19:15 UTC−3

Defensor Sporting (Uruguay)	1–1	(Brazil) Grêmio
Maulella 84'	Report	Maicon 80'

Estadio Luis Franzini, Montevideo
Attendance: 10,601
Referee: Fernando Rapallini (Argentina)
27 February 2018
18:15 UTC−4

Monagas (Venezuela)	0–2	(Paraguay) Cerro Porteño
	Report	Insaurralde 26'; M. Cáceres 52'

Estadio Monumental de Maturín, Maturín
Attendance: 28,000
Referee: Mauro Vigliano (Argentina)

13 March 2018
21:30 UTC−3

Cerro Porteño (Paraguay)	2–1	(Uruguay) Defensor Sporting
Churín 8', 90+6'	Report	Benavídez 46'

Estadio General Pablo Rojas, Asunción
Attendance: 35,000
Referee: Roddy Zambrano (Ecuador)
4 April 2018
19:15 UTC−3

Grêmio (Brazil)	4–0	(Venezuela) Monagas
Jael 50'; Éverton 60'; Luan 86'; Cícero 90'	Report

Arena do Grêmio, Porto Alegre
Attendance: 21,250
Referee: Carlos Orbe (Ecuador)

17 April 2018
19:15 UTC−3

Defensor Sporting (Uruguay)	3–1	(Venezuela) Monagas
Benavídez 57', 64'; Cabrera 68' (pen.)	Report	Vogliotti 63'

Estadio Luis Franzini, Montevideo
Attendance: 10,000
Referee: Diego Haro (Peru)
17 April 2018
20:30 UTC−4

Cerro Porteño (Paraguay)	0–0	(Brazil) Grêmio
	Report

Estadio General Pablo Rojas, Asunción
Attendance: 46,167
Referee: Germán Delfino (Argentina)

25 April 2018
20:45 UTC−4

Monagas (Venezuela)	1–0	(Uruguay) Defensor Sporting
Trejo 52'	Report

Estadio Monumental de Maturín, Maturín
Attendance: 35,123
Referee: Andrés Rojas (Colombia)
1 May 2018
19:15 UTC−3

Grêmio (Brazil)	5–0	(Paraguay) Cerro Porteño
Éverton 27', 71'; Ramiro 30'; Jael 49'; Cícero 81'	Report

Arena do Grêmio, Porto Alegre
Attendance: 27,315
Referee: Patricio Loustau (Argentina)

15 May 2018
19:15 UTC−3

Defensor Sporting (Uruguay)	0–1	(Paraguay) Cerro Porteño
	Report	Churín 90'

Estadio Luis Franzini, Montevideo
Attendance: 15,000
Referee: Néstor Pitana (Argentina)
15 May 2018
20:30 UTC−4

Monagas (Venezuela)	1–2	(Brazil) Grêmio
Kannemann 90+1' (o.g.)	Report	Ramiro 68'; Jailson 90+6' (pen.)

Estadio Monumental de Maturín, Maturín
Attendance: 29,500
Referee: Fernando Rapallini (Argentina)

23 May 2018
19:15 UTC−3

Grêmio (Brazil)	1–0	(Uruguay) Defensor Sporting
Luan 65'	Report

Arena do Grêmio, Porto Alegre
Attendance: 18,051
Referee: Nicolás Gallo (Colombia)
23 May 2018
18:15 UTC−4

Cerro Porteño (Paraguay)	3–2	(Venezuela) Monagas
Churín 5' (pen.); Haedo Valdez 47' (pen.), 90+1'	Report	Rojas 70'; Cádiz 79'

Estadio General Pablo Rojas, Asunción
Referee: Fernando Espinoza (Argentina)

=== Group B ===
Pos	Team	Pld	W	D	L	GF	GA	GD	Pts	Qualification	ATN	CCL	BOL	DEL
1	(Colombia) Atlético Nacional	6	3	1	2	9	3	+6	10	Round of 16	—	0–0	4–1	4–0
2	(Chile) Colo-Colo	6	2	2	2	5	5	0	8	Round of 16	0–1	—	2–0	0–2
3	(Bolivia) Bolívar	6	2	2	2	6	9	−3	8	Copa Sudamericana	1–0	1–1	—	2–1
4	(Ecuador) Delfín	6	2	1	3	6	9	−3	7		1–0	1–2	1–1	—

Source: CONMEBOL
27 February 2018
21:30 UTC−3

Colo-Colo (Chile)	0–1	(Colombia) Atlético Nacional
	Report	Hernández 66'

Estadio Monumental David Arellano, Santiago
Attendance: 39,034
Referee: Wilton Sampaio (Brazil)
28 February 2018
19:45 UTC−5

Delfín (Ecuador)	1–1	(Bolivia) Bolívar
Ordóñez 45+1'	Report	Riquelme 18'

Estadio Jocay, Manta
Attendance: 15,253
Referee: Rodolpho Toski (Brazil)

14 March 2018
18:15 UTC−4

Bolívar (Bolivia)	1–1	(Chile) Colo-Colo
Arce 37' (pen.)	Report	Rivero 42'

Estadio Hernando Siles, La Paz
Attendance: 20,000
Referee: Darío Herrera (Argentina)
14 March 2018
19:45 UTC−5

Atlético Nacional (Colombia)	4–0	(Ecuador) Delfín
Moreno 31' (pen.); Lenis 46', 56'; M. Torres 52'	Report

Estadio Atanasio Girardot, Medellín
Attendance: 30,560
Referee: Diego Haro (Peru)

5 April 2018
19:15 UTC−3

Colo-Colo (Chile)	0–2	(Ecuador) Delfín
	Report	Arismendi 51'; Carmona 90+2' (o.g.)

Estadio Monumental David Arellano, Santiago
Attendance: 30,282
Referee: Daniel Fedorczuk (Uruguay)
5 April 2018
20:30 UTC−4

Bolívar (Bolivia)	1–0	(Colombia) Atlético Nacional
Riquelme 37'	Report

Estadio Hernando Siles, La Paz
Attendance: 24,700
Referee: Néstor Pitana (Argentina)

24 April 2018
19:30 UTC−5

Atlético Nacional (Colombia)	4–1	(Bolivia) Bolívar
Castellani 12'; Hernández 31'; Moreno 33', 65'	Report	Riquelme 48'

Estadio Atanasio Girardot, Medellín
Attendance: 37,829
Referee: Raphael Claus (Brazil)
2 May 2018
20:30 UTC−5 (Note: Kick-off of the Delfín v Colo-Colo match was delayed from 19:45 to 20:30 local time due to a problem in the electrical system.)

Delfín (Ecuador)	1–2	(Chile) Colo-Colo
Chicaiza 78'	Report	Valdés 20'; Paredes 44' (pen.)

Estadio Jocay, Manta
Attendance: 14,900
Referee: Andrés Cunha (Uruguay)

15 May 2018
17:15 UTC−5

Delfín (Ecuador)	1–0	(Colombia) Atlético Nacional
Chicaiza 19'	Report

Estadio Jocay, Manta
Attendance: 16,536
Referee: Víctor Carrillo (Peru)
15 May 2018
20:30 UTC−4

Colo-Colo (Chile)	2–0	(Bolivia) Bolívar
Paredes 30', 37'	Report

Estadio Monumental David Arellano, Santiago
Attendance: 38,423
Referee: Sandro Ricci (Brazil)

24 May 2018
20:30 UTC−4

Bolívar (Bolivia)	2–1	(Ecuador) Delfín
Callejón 12', 47'	Report	Raldes 49' (o.g.)

Estadio Hernando Siles, La Paz
Attendance: 20,000
Referee: Wilton Sampaio (Brazil)
24 May 2018
19:30 UTC−5

Atlético Nacional (Colombia)	0–0	(Chile) Colo-Colo
	Report

Estadio Atanasio Girardot, Medellín
Attendance: 36,789
Referee: Néstor Pitana (Argentina)

=== Group C ===
Pos	Team	Pld	W	D	L	GF	GA	GD	Pts	Qualification	LIB	ATU	PEÑ	STR
1	(Paraguay) Libertad	6	4	1	1	10	4	+6	13	Round of 16	—	0–0	2–1	3–0
2	(Argentina) Atlético Tucumán	6	3	1	2	7	6	+1	10	Round of 16	0–2	—	1–0	3–0
3	(Uruguay) Peñarol	6	3	0	3	8	5	+3	9	Copa Sudamericana	2–0	3–1	—	2–0
4	(Bolivia) The Strongest	6	1	0	5	3	13	−10	3		1–3	1–2	1–0	—

Source: CONMEBOL
13 March 2018
19:15 UTC−3

Atlético Tucumán (Argentina)	0–2	(Paraguay) Libertad
	Report	Salcedo 63'; Alborno 78'

Estadio Monumental José Fierro, Tucumán
Attendance: 30,000
Referee: Raphael Claus (Brazil)
15 March 2018
18:15 UTC−4

The Strongest (Bolivia)	1–0	(Uruguay) Peñarol
Carcelén 19'	Report

Estadio Hernando Siles, La Paz
Attendance: 27,579
Referee: Anderson Daronco (Brazil)

3 April 2018
18:15 UTC−4

Libertad (Paraguay)	3–0	(Bolivia) The Strongest
Báez 58'; Leiva 65', 90+2'	Report

Estadio Dr. Nicolás Léoz, Asunción
Attendance: 8,711
Referee: Diego Haro (Peru)
4 April 2018
19:15 UTC−3

Peñarol (Uruguay)	3–1	(Argentina) Atlético Tucumán
C. Rodríguez 10' (pen.); Acosta 50' (o.g.); Rojo 82'	Report	Rodríguez 64' (pen.)

Estadio Campeón del Siglo, Montevideo
Attendance: 28,605
Referee: Wilton Sampaio (Brazil)

18 April 2018
18:15 UTC−4

The Strongest (Bolivia)	1–2	(Argentina) Atlético Tucumán
Ibargüen 37'	Report	Romat 11'; Toledo 74'

Estadio Hernando Siles, La Paz
Attendance: 24,907
Referee: Julio Bascuñán (Chile)
18 April 2018
20:45 UTC−4

Libertad (Paraguay)	2–1	(Uruguay) Peñarol
Salcedo 74'; Cardozo 89'	Report	Fernández 46'

Estadio Dr. Nicolás Léoz, Asunción
Attendance: 9,031
Referee: Wilmar Roldán (Colombia)

25 April 2018
19:15 UTC−3

Atlético Tucumán (Argentina)	3–0	(Bolivia) The Strongest
Díaz 30'; Núñez 44'; Rodríguez 89'	Report

Estadio Monumental José Fierro, Tucumán
Attendance: 32,500
Referee: Luiz Flávio de Oliveira (Brazil)
26 April 2018
21:30 UTC−3

Peñarol (Uruguay)	2–0	(Paraguay) Libertad
C. Rodríguez 43' (pen.); Palacios 90'	Report

Estadio Campeón del Siglo, Montevideo
Attendance: 30,911
Referee: Anderson Daronco (Brazil)

2 May 2018
19:15 UTC−3

Atlético Tucumán (Argentina)	1–0	(Uruguay) Peñarol
Díaz 58'	Report

Estadio Monumental José Fierro, Tucumán
Attendance: 35,000
Referee: Sandro Ricci (Brazil)
3 May 2018
20:30 UTC−4

The Strongest (Bolivia)	1–3	(Paraguay) Libertad
Castro 47'	Report	Cardozo 21', 90+2' (pen.); Bareiro 85'

Estadio Hernando Siles, La Paz
Attendance: 20,000
Referee: Ricardo Marques (Brazil)

17 May 2018
19:15 UTC−3

Peñarol (Uruguay)	2–0	(Bolivia) The Strongest
Palacios 19'; C. Rodríguez 37' (pen.)	Report

Estadio Campeón del Siglo, Montevideo
Attendance: 24,015
Referee: Andrés Rojas (Colombia)
17 May 2018
18:15 UTC−4

Libertad (Paraguay)	0–0	(Argentina) Atlético Tucumán
	Report

Estadio Dr. Nicolás Léoz, Asunción
Attendance: 9,561
Referee: Wilton Sampaio (Brazil)

=== Group D ===
Pos	Team	Pld	W	D	L	GF	GA	GD	Pts	Qualification	RIV	FLA	SFE	EME
1	(Argentina) River Plate	6	3	3	0	6	3	+3	12	Round of 16	—	0–0	0–0	2–1
2	(Brazil) Flamengo	6	2	4	0	7	4	+3	10	Round of 16	2–2	—	1–1	2–0
3	(Colombia) Santa Fe	6	1	4	1	5	3	+2	7	Copa Sudamericana	0–1	0–0	—	1–1
4	(Ecuador) Emelec	6	0	1	5	3	11	−8	1		0–1	1–2	0–3	—

Source: CONMEBOL
28 February 2018
21:45 UTC−3

Flamengo (Brazil)	2–2	(Argentina) River Plate
Henrique Dourado 53' (pen.); Éverton 65'	Report	Mora 55'; Mayada 86'

Estádio Olímpico Nilton Santos, Rio de Janeiro (Note: Flamengo played their home match against River Plate at Estádio Olímpico Nilton Santos, Rio de Janeiro, instead of their regular stadiums Estádio do Maracanã, Rio de Janeiro, due to concerts at the end of February, and Estádio Ilha do Urubu, Rio de Janeiro, due to damages by a storm. They played their home matches against Santa Fe and Emelec at Estádio do Maracanã, Rio de Janeiro.)
Attendance: 0 (Note: Flamengo played their home matches against River Plate and Santa Fe behind closed doors as they were punished for previous crowd disturbances at the 2017 Copa Sudamericana Finals.)
Referee: Michael Espinoza (Peru)
1 March 2018 (Note: The Santa Fe v Emelec match was originally scheduled on 28 February 2018, 17:15 local time, but was re-scheduled to 1 March 2018, 17:15 local time to avoid a clash with the Millonarios v Corinthians Group G match.)
17:15 UTC−5

Santa Fe (Colombia)	1–1	(Ecuador) Emelec
Morelo 41'	Report	Angulo 56'

Estadio El Campín, Bogotá
Attendance: 28,689
Referee: Juan Soto (Venezuela)

14 March 2018
19:45 UTC−5

Emelec (Ecuador)	1–2	(Brazil) Flamengo
Angulo 64'	Report	Vinícius Júnior 77', 84'

Estadio George Capwell, Guayaquil
Attendance: 30,000
Referee: Mario Díaz de Vivar (Paraguay)
5 April 2018
19:15 UTC−3

River Plate (Argentina)	0–0	(Colombia) Santa Fe
	Report

Estadio Monumental Antonio Vespucio Liberti, Buenos Aires
Attendance: 61,000
Referee: Julio Bascuñán (Chile)

18 April 2018
21:45 UTC−3

Flamengo (Brazil)	1–1	(Colombia) Santa Fe
Henrique Dourado 7'	Report	Morelo 30'

Estádio do Maracanã, Rio de Janeiro
Attendance: 0
Referee: Andrés Cunha (Uruguay)
19 April 2018
19:30 UTC−5

Emelec (Ecuador)	0–1	(Argentina) River Plate
	Report	Pinola 43'

Estadio George Capwell, Guayaquil
Attendance: 26,345
Referee: Enrique Cáceres (Paraguay)

25 April 2018
19:45 UTC−5

Santa Fe (Colombia)	0–0	(Brazil) Flamengo
	Report

Estadio El Campín, Bogotá
Attendance: 20,312
Referee: Daniel Fedorczuk (Uruguay)
26 April 2018
19:15 UTC−3

River Plate (Argentina)	2–1	(Ecuador) Emelec
Pratto 65'; Martínez 73'	Report	Preciado 90+1'

Estadio Monumental Antonio Vespucio Liberti, Buenos Aires
Attendance: 58,215
Referee: Víctor Carrillo (Peru)

3 May 2018
19:30 UTC−5

Santa Fe (Colombia)	0–1	(Argentina) River Plate
	Report	Pratto 23'

Estadio El Campín, Bogotá
Attendance: 34,508
Referee: Roberto Tobar (Chile)
16 May 2018
21:45 UTC−3

Flamengo (Brazil)	2–0	(Ecuador) Emelec
Éverton Ribeiro 47', 90+1'	Report

Estádio do Maracanã, Rio de Janeiro
Attendance: 63,577
Referee: Diego Haro (Peru)

23 May 2018
21:45 UTC−3

River Plate (Argentina)	0–0	(Brazil) Flamengo
	Report

Estadio Monumental Antonio Vespucio Liberti, Buenos Aires
Referee: Andrés Cunha (Uruguay)
23 May 2018
19:45 UTC−5

Emelec (Ecuador)	0–3	(Colombia) Santa Fe
	Report	Tesillo 39'; Morelo 51'; Pajoy 53'

Estadio George Capwell, Guayaquil
Referee: Piero Maza (Chile)

=== Group E ===
Pos	Team	Pld	W	D	L	GF	GA	GD	Pts	Qualification	CRU	RAC	VAS	UCH
1	(Brazil) Cruzeiro	6	3	2	1	15	5	+10	11	Round of 16	—	2–1	0–0	7–0
2	(Argentina) Racing	6	3	2	1	12	6	+6	11	Round of 16	4–2	—	4–0	1–0
3	(Brazil) Vasco da Gama	6	1	2	3	3	10	−7	5	Copa Sudamericana	0–4	1–1	—	0–1
4	Universidad de Chile	6	1	2	3	2	11	−9	5		0–0	1–1	0–2	—

Source: CONMEBOL
27 February 2018
21:30 UTC−3

Racing (Argentina)	4–2	(Brazil) Cruzeiro
Martínez 13', 44', 62'; Solari 76'	Report	De Arrascaeta 29'; Robinho 69'

Estadio Presidente Juan Domingo Perón, Avellaneda
Attendance: 35,920
Referee: Wilmar Roldán (Colombia)
13 March 2018
21:30 UTC−3

Vasco da Gama (Brazil)	0–1	Universidad de Chile
	Report	Araos 76'

Estádio São Januário, Rio de Janeiro
Attendance: 19,281
Referee: Daniel Fedorczuk (Uruguay)

3 April 2018
21:30 UTC−3

Universidad de Chile	1–1	(Argentina) Racing
Pizarro 9'	Report	Donatti 22'

Estadio Nacional Julio Martínez Prádanos, Santiago
Attendance: 45,545
Referee: Enrique Cáceres (Paraguay)
4 April 2018
21:45 UTC−3

Cruzeiro (Brazil)	0–0	(Brazil) Vasco da Gama
	Report

Estádio Mineirão, Belo Horizonte
Attendance: 38,019
Referee: Raphael Claus (Brazil)

19 April 2018
19:15 UTC−3

Racing (Argentina)	4–0	(Brazil) Vasco da Gama
Centurión 32'; Martínez 38'; Zaracho 51'; López 60' (pen.)	Report

Estadio Presidente Juan Domingo Perón, Avellaneda
Attendance: 41,893
Referee: Ulises Mereles (Paraguay)
19 April 2018
21:30 UTC−3

Universidad de Chile	0–0	(Brazil) Cruzeiro
	Report

Estadio Nacional Julio Martínez Prádanos, Santiago
Attendance: 45,084
Referee: Víctor Carrillo (Peru)

26 April 2018
19:15 UTC−3

Cruzeiro (Brazil)	7–0	Universidad de Chile
Thiago Neves 9', 74'; Rafinha 17'; Sassá 43' (pen.), 61'; De Arrascaeta 53'; Rafael Sóbis 80'	Report

Estádio Mineirão, Belo Horizonte
Attendance: 37,095
Referee: Roddy Zambrano (Ecuador)
26 April 2018
21:30 UTC−3

Vasco da Gama (Brazil)	1–1	(Argentina) Racing
Wágner 80'	Report	Martínez 31'

Estádio São Januário, Rio de Janeiro
Attendance: 10,346
Referee: Diego Haro (Peru)

2 May 2018
21:45 UTC−3

Vasco da Gama (Brazil)	0–4	(Brazil) Cruzeiro
	Report	Léo 9'; Thiago Neves 24'; Sassá 32', 54'

Estádio São Januário, Rio de Janeiro
Attendance: 11,501
Referee: Anderson Daronco (Brazil)
3 May 2018
19:15 UTC−3

Racing (Argentina)	1–0	Universidad de Chile
Donatti 80'	Report

Estadio Presidente Juan Domingo Perón, Avellaneda
Attendance: 43,785
Referee: Enrique Cáceres (Paraguay)

22 May 2018
21:30 UTC−3

Cruzeiro (Brazil)	2–1	(Argentina) Racing
Thiago Neves 2'; Lucas Silva 10'	Report	Centurión 27'

Estádio Mineirão, Belo Horizonte
Attendance: 44,512
Referee: Andrés Rojas (Colombia)
22 May 2018
20:30 UTC−4

Universidad de Chile	0–2	(Brazil) Vasco da Gama
	Report	Bruno Silva 14'; Yago Pikachu 81'

Estadio Nacional Julio Martínez Prádanos, Santiago
Attendance: 38,660
Referee: Gery Vargas (Bolivia)

=== Group F ===
Pos	Team	Pld	W	D	L	GF	GA	GD	Pts	Qualification	SAN	EST	NAC	RGA
1	(Brazil) Santos	6	3	1	2	6	4	+2	10	Round of 16	—	2–0	3–1	0–0
2	(Argentina) Estudiantes	6	2	2	2	6	4	+2	8	Round of 16	0–1	—	3–1	3–0
3	(Uruguay) Nacional	6	2	2	2	7	6	+1	8	Copa Sudamericana	1–0	0–0	—	4–0
4	(Peru) Real Garcilaso	6	1	3	2	2	7	−5	6		2–0	0–0	0–0	—

Source: CONMEBOL
28 February 2018
19:15 UTC−3

Nacional (Uruguay)	0–0	(Argentina) Estudiantes
	Report

Estadio Gran Parque Central, Montevideo
Attendance: 20,000
Referee: Mario Díaz de Vivar (Paraguay)
1 March 2018
17:15 UTC−5

Real Garcilaso (Peru)	2–0	(Brazil) Santos
Vidales 7'; Ramúa 88'	Report

Estadio Garcilaso, Cusco
Attendance: 35,190
Referee: Gery Vargas (Bolivia)

14 March 2018
19:15 UTC−3

Estudiantes (Argentina)	3–0	(Peru) Real Garcilaso
Melano 52'; Pavone 74' (pen.), 86'	Report

Estadio Ciudad de La Plata, La Plata
Attendance: 35,932
Referee: Alexis Herrera (Venezuela)
15 March 2018
19:15 UTC−3

Santos (Brazil)	3–1	(Uruguay) Nacional
Eduardo Sasha 19', 83'; Rodrygo 47'	Report	Oliva 82'

Estádio do Pacaembu, São Paulo (Note: Santos played their home match against Nacional at Estádio do Pacaembu, São Paulo, instead of their regular stadium Estádio Urbano Caldeira, Santos. They played their home matches against Estudiantes and Real Garcilaso at Estádio Urbano Caldeira, Santos.)
Attendance: 18,077
Referee: Ulises Mereles (Paraguay)

3 April 2018
17:15 UTC−5

Real Garcilaso (Peru)	0–0	(Uruguay) Nacional
	Report

Estadio Garcilaso, Cusco
Attendance: 33,709
Referee: Wilmar Roldán (Colombia)
5 April 2018
21:30 UTC−3

Estudiantes (Argentina)	0–1	(Brazil) Santos
	Report	Arthur Gomes 18'

Estadio Centenario Ciudad de Quilmes, Quilmes (Note: Estudiantes played their home match against Santos at Estadio Centenario Ciudad de Quilmes, Quilmes, instead of their regular stadium Estadio Ciudad de La Plata, La Plata.)
Attendance: 27,904
Referee: Roddy Zambrano (Ecuador)

24 April 2018
21:30 UTC−3

Santos (Brazil)	2–0	(Argentina) Estudiantes
Gabriel 43'; Lucas Veríssimo 49'	Report

Estádio Urbano Caldeira, Santos
Attendance: 15,632
Referee: Éber Aquino (Paraguay)
25 April 2018
19:15 UTC−3

Nacional (Uruguay)	4–0	(Peru) Real Garcilaso
Rodríguez 39'; Corujo 80'; Barcia 85'; Bergessio 88'	Report

Estadio Gran Parque Central, Montevideo
Attendance: 25,000
Referee: José Argote (Venezuela)

1 May 2018
17:15 UTC−5

Real Garcilaso (Peru)	0–0	(Argentina) Estudiantes
	Report

Estadio Garcilaso, Cusco
Attendance: 29,801
Referee: Julio Bascuñán (Chile)
1 May 2018
21:30 UTC−3

Nacional (Uruguay)	1–0	(Brazil) Santos
Barcia 57'	Report

Estadio Gran Parque Central, Montevideo
Attendance: 26,500
Referee: Wilmar Roldán (Colombia)

24 May 2018
19:15 UTC−3

Santos (Brazil)	0–0	(Peru) Real Garcilaso
	Report

Estádio Urbano Caldeira, Santos
Attendance: 5,016
Referee: Alexis Herrera (Venezuela)
24 May 2018
19:15 UTC−3

Estudiantes (Argentina)	3–1	(Uruguay) Nacional
Otero 61' (pen.), 89' (pen.); Melano 68'	Report	Zunino 3'

Estadio Ciudad de La Plata, La Plata
Referee: Mario Díaz de Vivar (Paraguay)

=== Group G ===
Pos	Team	Pld	W	D	L	GF	GA	GD	Pts	Qualification	COR	IND	MIL	LAR
1	(Brazil) Corinthians	6	3	1	2	11	5	+6	10	Round of 16	—	1–2	0–1	2–0
2	(Argentina) Independiente	6	3	1	2	6	4	+2	10	Round of 16	0–1	—	1–0	2–0
3	(Colombia) Millonarios	6	2	2	2	7	4	+3	8	Copa Sudamericana	0–0	1–1	—	4–0
4	(Venezuela) Deportivo Lara	6	2	0	4	5	16	−11	6		2–7	1–0	2–1	—

Source: CONMEBOL
28 February 2018
19:45 UTC−5

Millonarios (Colombia)	0–0	(Brazil) Corinthians
	Report

Estadio El Campín, Bogotá
Attendance: 25,589
Referee: Roddy Zambrano (Ecuador)
1 March 2018
18:15 UTC−4

Deportivo Lara (Venezuela)	1–0	(Argentina) Independiente
Sierra 10'	Report

Estadio Metropolitano de Cabudare, Cabudare
Attendance: 5,100
Referee: Diego Haro (Peru)

14 March 2018
21:45 UTC−3

Corinthians (Brazil)	2–0	(Venezuela) Deportivo Lara
Emerson Sheik 64'; Pernía 76' (o.g.)	Report

Arena Corinthians, São Paulo
Attendance: 31,767
Referee: Raúl Orosco (Bolivia)
15 March 2018
21:30 UTC−3

Independiente (Argentina)	1–0	(Colombia) Millonarios
Benítez 23'	Report

Estadio Libertadores de América, Avellaneda
Attendance: 32,654
Referee: Leodán González (Uruguay)

17 April 2018
19:30 UTC−5

Millonarios (Colombia)	4–0	(Venezuela) Deportivo Lara
Del Valle 19', 34', 78'; Quiñónes 66'	Report

Estadio El Campín, Bogotá
Attendance: 34,309
Referee: Carlos Orbe (Ecuador)
18 April 2018
21:45 UTC−3

Independiente (Argentina)	0–1	(Brazil) Corinthians
	Report	Jádson 80'

Estadio Libertadores de América, Avellaneda
Attendance: 40,325
Referee: Daniel Fedorczuk (Uruguay)

24 April 2018
18:15 UTC−4

Deportivo Lara (Venezuela)	2–1	(Colombia) Millonarios
Sierra 9', 27' (pen.)	Report	Del Valle 69' (pen.)

Estadio Metropolitano de Cabudare, Cabudare
Attendance: 10,903
Referee: Michael Espinoza (Peru)
2 May 2018
21:45 UTC−3

Corinthians (Brazil)	1–2	(Argentina) Independiente
Jádson 31'	Report	Benítez 1'; Romero 24' (o.g.)

Arena Corinthians, São Paulo
Attendance: 36,508
Referee: Víctor Carrillo (Peru)

17 May 2018
20:30 UTC−4

Deportivo Lara (Venezuela)	2–7	(Brazil) Corinthians
Reyes 45'; Hernández 76'	Report	Jádson 10', 31' (pen.), 51'; Sidcley 69'; Romero 85'; Junior Dutra 90+9', 90+11'

Estadio Metropolitano de Cabudare, Cabudare
Attendance: 25,820
Referee: Andrés Cunha (Uruguay)
17 May 2018
19:30 UTC−5

Millonarios (Colombia)	1–1	(Argentina) Independiente
Cadavid 58' (pen.)	Report	Gigliotti 74'

Estadio El Campín, Bogotá
Attendance: 26,511
Referee: Roberto Tobar (Chile)

24 May 2018
21:30 UTC−3

Corinthians (Brazil)	0–1	(Colombia) Millonarios
	Report	Carrillo 72'

Arena Corinthians, São Paulo
Attendance: 30,551
Referee: Diego Haro (Peru)
24 May 2018
21:30 UTC−3

Independiente (Argentina)	2–0	(Venezuela) Deportivo Lara
Benítez 37'; Gigliotti 80'	Report

Estadio Libertadores de América, Avellaneda
Referee: Éber Aquino (Paraguay)

=== Group H ===
Pos	Team	Pld	W	D	L	GF	GA	GD	Pts	Qualification	PAL	BOC	JUN	ALI
1	(Brazil) Palmeiras	6	5	1	0	14	3	+11	16	Round of 16	—	1–1	3–1	2–0
2	(Argentina) Boca Juniors	6	2	3	1	8	4	+4	9	Round of 16	0–2	—	1–0	5–0
3	(Colombia) Junior	6	2	1	3	5	8	−3	7	Copa Sudamericana	0–3	1–1	—	1–0
4	(Peru) Alianza Lima	6	0	1	5	1	13	−12	1		1–3	0–0	0–2	—

Source: CONMEBOL
1 March 2018
19:30 UTC−5

Alianza Lima (Peru)	0–0	(Argentina) Boca Juniors
	Report

Estadio Nacional, Lima (Note: Alianza Lima played their home match against Boca Juniors at Estadio Nacional, Lima, instead of their regular stadium Estadio Alejandro Villanueva, Lima.)
Attendance: 36,503
Referee: Daniel Fedorczuk (Uruguay)
1 March 2018
19:30 UTC−5

Junior (Colombia)	0–3	(Brazil) Palmeiras
	Report	Bruno Henrique 19', 70'; Borja 51'

Estadio Metropolitano Roberto Meléndez, Barranquilla
Attendance: 28,753
Referee: Enrique Cáceres (Paraguay)

3 April 2018
21:30 UTC−3

Palmeiras (Brazil)	2–0	(Peru) Alianza Lima
Thiago Martins 10'; Borja 46'	Report

Allianz Parque, São Paulo
Attendance: 30,456
Referee: José Argote (Venezuela)
4 April 2018
21:45 UTC−3

Boca Juniors (Argentina)	1–0	(Colombia) Junior
Pavón 27'	Report

Estadio Alberto J. Armando, Buenos Aires
Attendance: 47,546
Referee: Ulises Mereles (Paraguay)

11 April 2018
21:45 UTC−3

Palmeiras (Brazil)	1–1	(Argentina) Boca Juniors
Keno 89'	Report	Tévez 90+1'

Allianz Parque, São Paulo
Attendance: 37,192
Referee: Andrés Cunha (Uruguay)
19 April 2018
19:30 UTC−5

Alianza Lima (Peru)	0–2	(Colombia) Junior
	Report	Chará 9'; Álvez 82'

Estadio Alejandro Villanueva, Lima
Attendance: 10,000
Referee: Roddy Zambrano (Ecuador)

25 April 2018
21:45 UTC−3

Boca Juniors (Argentina)	0–2	(Brazil) Palmeiras
	Report	Keno 39'; Lucas Lima 66'

Estadio Alberto J. Armando, Buenos Aires
Attendance: 48,367
Referee: Roberto Tobar (Chile)
26 April 2018
19:30 UTC−5

Junior (Colombia)	1–0	(Peru) Alianza Lima
Ruiz 60'	Report

Estadio Metropolitano Roberto Meléndez, Barranquilla
Attendance: 29,001
Referee: Alexis Herrera (Venezuela)

2 May 2018
17:15 UTC−5

Junior (Colombia)	1–1	(Argentina) Boca Juniors
Ruiz 32'	Report	Ruiz 50' (o.g.)

Estadio Metropolitano Roberto Meléndez, Barranquilla
Attendance: 46,195
Referee: Roddy Zambrano (Ecuador)
3 May 2018
19:30 UTC−5

Alianza Lima (Peru)	1–3	(Brazil) Palmeiras
Cruzado 71' (pen.)	Report	Willian 19'; Hyoran 31'; Borja 66'

Estadio Alejandro Villanueva, Lima
Attendance: 15,873
Referee: Gery Vargas (Bolivia)

16 May 2018
21:45 UTC−3

Boca Juniors (Argentina)	5–0	(Peru) Alianza Lima
Cardona 11'; Fabra 19'; Ábila 34', 41'; Tévez 54'	Report

Estadio Alberto J. Armando, Buenos Aires
Attendance: 47,854
Referee: Mario Díaz de Vivar (Paraguay)
16 May 2018
21:45 UTC−3

Palmeiras (Brazil)	3–1	(Colombia) Junior
Borja 51', 59', 68'	Report	T. Gutiérrez 66'

Allianz Parque, São Paulo
Attendance: 40,100
Referee: Enrique Cáceres (Paraguay)
