= 2018 Copa Libertadores finals =

- Promotional poster of the finals
- Event: 2018 Copa Libertadores
Boca Juniors	River Plate
(Argentina)	(Argentina)
3	5
- on aggregate

First leg
Boca Juniors	River Plate
2	2
- Date: 11 November 2018 (Note: The Boca Juniors v River Plate match, originally scheduled on 10 November 2018, 17:00 UTC−3, was postponed to the following day due to a waterlogged pitch.)
- Venue: Estadio Alberto J. Armando, Buenos Aires
- Referee: Roberto Tobar (Chile)
- Attendance: 54,000

Second leg
River Plate	Boca Juniors
3	1
- After extra time
- Date: 9 December 2018 (Note: The River Plate v Boca Juniors match, originally scheduled on 24 November 2018, 17:00 UTC−3, was postponed to 9 December 2018 due to an attack on the Boca Juniors team bus when several players were injured.)
- Venue: Santiago Bernabéu Stadium, Madrid, Spain (Note: The River Plate v Boca Juniors match, originally scheduled to be hosted by River Plate at the Estadio Monumental Antonio Vespucio Liberti, Buenos Aires, took place in Spain at the Santiago Bernabéu Stadium, Madrid due to safety concerns.)
- Referee: Andrés Cunha (Uruguay)
- Attendance: 62,282

The 2018 Copa Libertadores finals, also known as The Greater Final (La Gran Final) was the two-legged final to decide the winners of the 2018 Copa Libertadores, the 59th edition of the Copa Libertadores, South America's premier international club football tournament organised by CONMEBOL. The first leg was hosted by Boca Juniors at the Estadio Alberto J. Armando in Buenos Aires, Argentina, on 11 November 2018, while the second leg took place outside South America at the Santiago Bernabéu Stadium in Madrid, Spain (a neutral venue) on 9 December 2018. This was the last final to take place over two legs, as starting from 2019 the final would be played as a single match at a venue chosen in advance.

The finals were contested in a two-legged home-and-away format between Argentine clubs Boca Juniors and River Plate, making it, as of 2026, the only Superclásico final of an international competition and the only time both Copa Libertadores finalists represented the same country other than Brazil. As of 2026, this is also the last final to not feature a Brazilian team. This is also the last final not won by a club from Brazil.

The second leg was originally to be hosted by River Plate at the Estadio Monumental Antonio Vespucio Liberti in Buenos Aires, Argentina, on 24 November 2018. However, due to safety concerns arising from an attack on the Boca Juniors team bus prior to the match, CONMEBOL moved the second leg outside of Argentina and South America to a neutral venue, which was the Santiago Bernabéu Stadium in Madrid, Spain. This was the first, and as of 2025, only time that the second leg of the Copa Libertadores final has been held outside of South America, and the first and only final held outside of the Americas.

River Plate won the final 5–3 on aggregate for their fourth Copa Libertadores title. As winners, they qualified as the CONMEBOL representative at the 2018 FIFA Club World Cup in the United Arab Emirates, entering in the semi-finals. They also earned the right to play against the winners of the 2018 Copa Sudamericana in the 2019 Recopa Sudamericana. River Plate also automatically qualified for the group stage of the 2019 Copa Libertadores.

Due to the intense rivalry between Boca and River, the match was referred to as the "Superfinal", and "the final to end all finals". The press called it the "most important final in Argentina's football history". According to Richard Martin, a Reuters reporter, River's win "guarantees them bragging rights over their neighbours for many years to come". The match is also known as the Madrid Final (Final de Madrid), December 9th Final (Final del 9 de diciembre) or shortened as 9/12 or 912.

== Teams ==
Team	Previous finals appearances (bold indicates winners)
(Argentina) Boca Juniors	10 (1963, **1977**, **1978**, 1979, **2000**, **2001**, **2003**, 2004, **2007**, 2012)
(Argentina) River Plate	5 (1966, 1976, **1986**, **1996**, **2015**)

For the third time, two teams from the same country faced each other in the final, after Brazilian teams met in the 2005 and 2006 finals. It was the first all-Argentine final of the Copa Libertadores, as well as the first final to feature two teams from the same city. The 2018 finals marked the first time that the Superclásico was contested in the Copa Libertadores final (or any final of an international competition), and the third time that the two clubs met in a final, after the 1976 Nacional championship final and the 2017 Supercopa Argentina.

Their most recent previous meeting in the Copa Libertadores had been in the 2015 round of 16, where Boca Juniors were disqualified and the tie awarded to River Plate, after River players were attacked in la Bombonera stadium with pepper spray by Boca Juniors fans as they emerged for the second half of the second leg, with River leading on aggregate 1–0.

== Venues ==
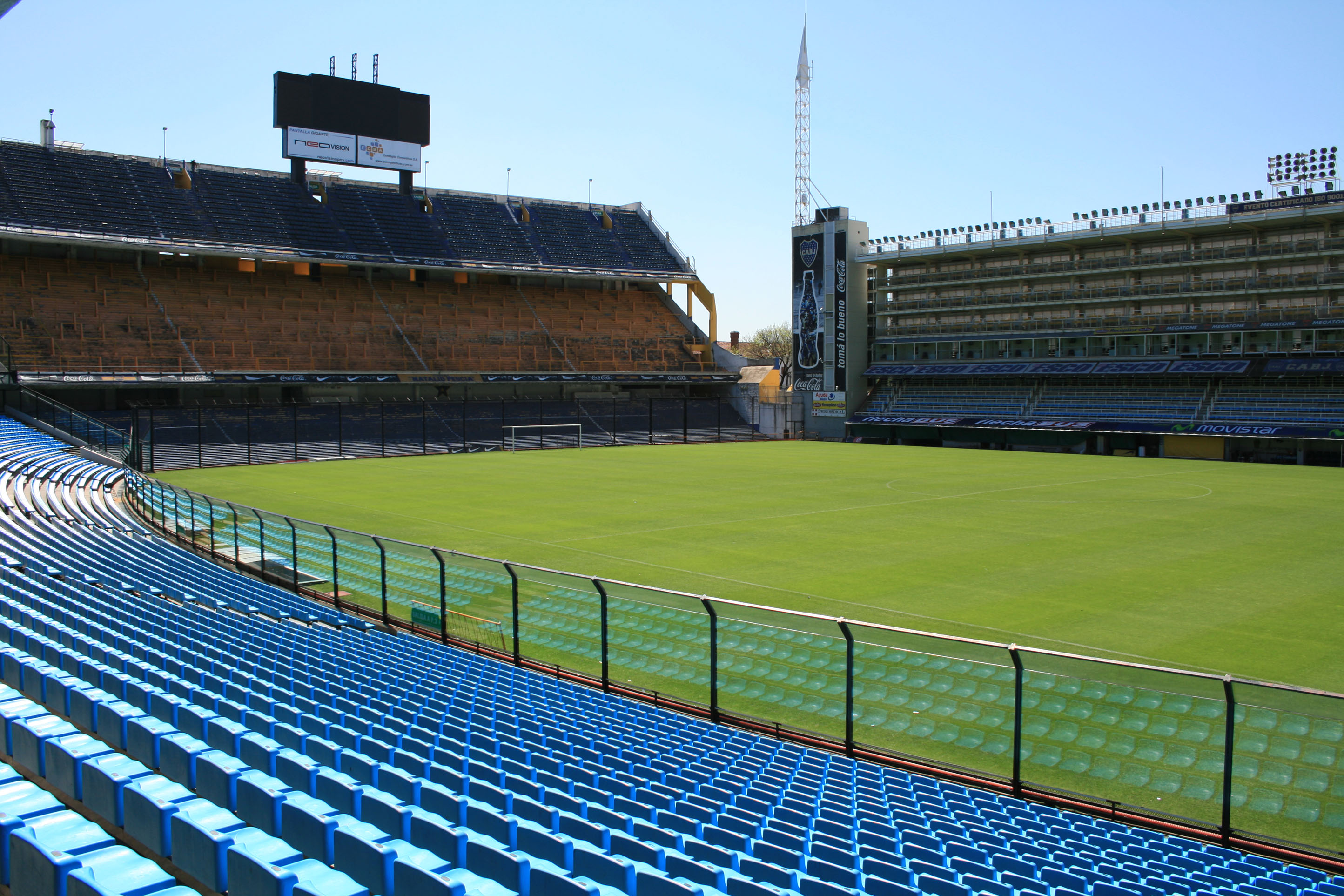
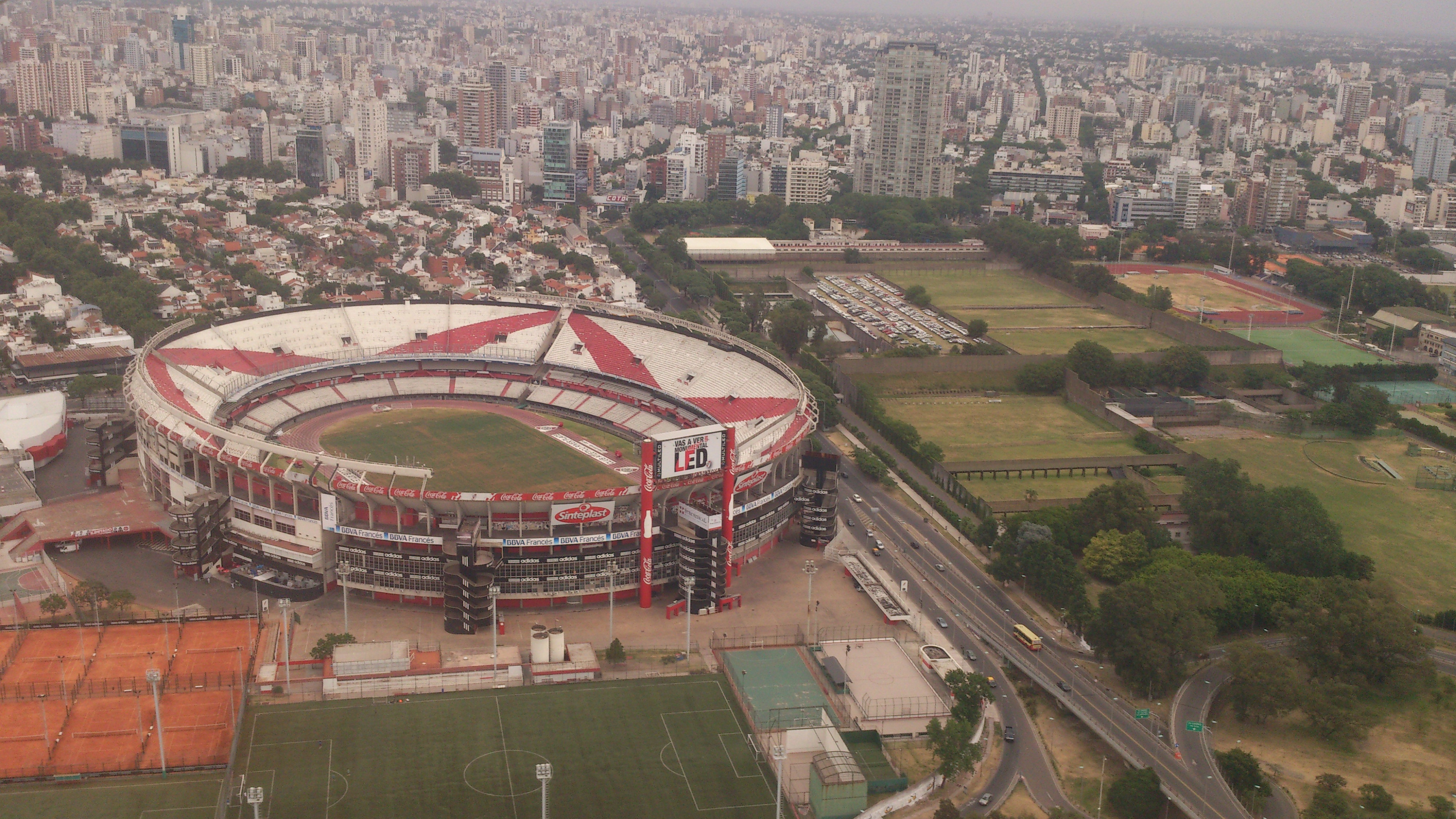
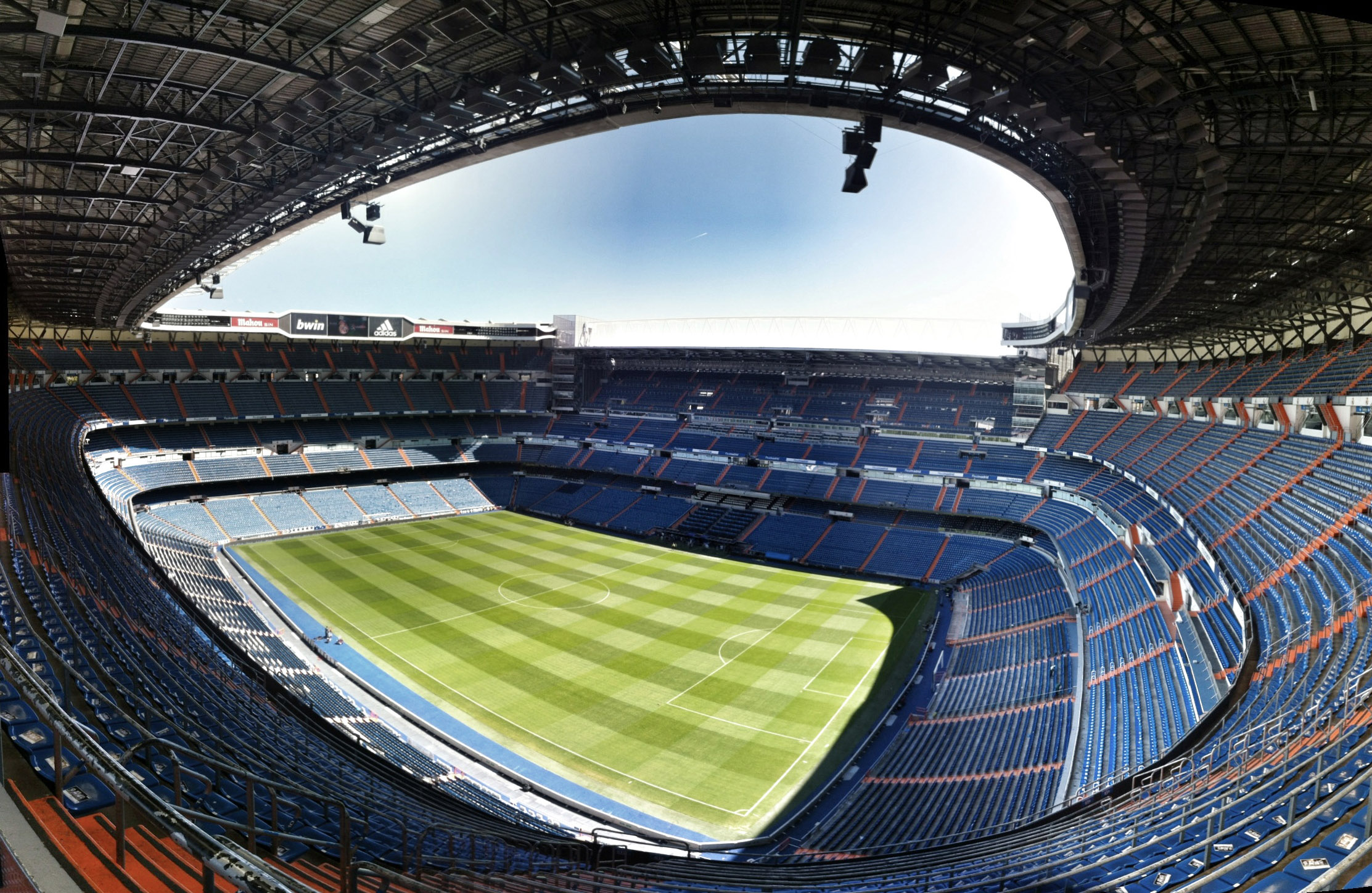
La Bombonera and Estadio Monumental, original venues for the series. The second leg was moved and hosted at the Santiago Bernabéu Stadium in Madrid, Spain.

== Road to the final ==
The competition proper started with the second stage, contested as eight double round-robin groups of four teams, with the top two qualifying for the knockout stages. The knockout stage ties were decided based on home and away matches, and teams were seeded according to their performance in the group stage to determine which team would play the second leg at their home ground.

(Argentina) Boca Juniors				Round	(Argentina) River Plate			
Opponent	Result			Group stage	Opponent	Result		
(Peru) Alianza Lima	0–0 (A)			Matchday 1	(Brazil) Flamengo	2–2 (A)		
(Colombia) Junior	1–0 (H)			Matchday 2	(Colombia) Santa Fe	0–0 (H)		
(Brazil) Palmeiras	1–1 (A)			Matchday 3	(Ecuador) Emelec	1–0 (A)		
(Brazil) Palmeiras	0–2 (H)			Matchday 4	(Ecuador) Emelec	2–1 (H)		
(Colombia) Junior	1–1 (A)			Matchday 5	(Colombia) Santa Fe	1–0 (A)		
(Peru) Alianza Lima	5–0 (H)			Matchday 6	(Brazil) Flamengo	0–0 (H)		
Group H runners-up: Pos / Team / Pld / Pts; 1 / (Brazil) Palmeiras / 6 / 16; 2 / (Argentina) Boca Juniors / 6 / 9; 3 / (Colombia) Junior / 6 / 7; 4 / (Peru) Alianza Lima / 6 / 1; Source: CONMEBOL				Final standings	Group D winners: Pos / Team / Pld / Pts; 1 / (Argentina) River Plate / 6 / 12; 2 / (Brazil) Flamengo / 6 / 10; 3 / (Colombia) Santa Fe / 6 / 7; 4 / (Ecuador) Emelec / 6 / 1; Source: CONMEBOL			
Seed 14				Final stages	Seed 4			
Opponent	Agg.	1st leg	2nd leg	Final stages	Opponent	Agg.	1st leg	2nd leg
(Paraguay) Libertad	6–2	2–0 (H)	4–2 (A)	Round of 16	(Argentina) Racing	3–0	0–0 (A)	3–0 (H)
(Brazil) Cruzeiro	3–1	2–0 (H)	1–1 (A)	Quarter-finals	(Argentina) Independiente	3–1	0–0 (A)	3–1 (H)
(Brazil) Palmeiras	4–2	2–0 (H)	2–2 (A)	Semi-finals	(Brazil) Grêmio	2–2 (a)	0–1 (H)	2–1 (A)

== Matches ==
=== First leg ===
==== Summary ====
The first leg of the final was originally scheduled for 7 November, with the second leg on 28 November 2018 (both on Wednesdays). However, after the finalists were known, CONMEBOL adjusted the dates, with the first leg (hosted by Boca Juniors, the lower seed) on 10 November and the second leg (hosted by River Plate, the higher seed) on 24 November (both Saturdays at 16:00 local time). The Argentine Football Association opposed the date change. Following discussion, the final was moved to 17:00 local time. The first leg was postponed less than two hours before kickoff due to Boca Junior's pitch at the Estadio Alberto J. Armando being waterlogged due to local flooding. The match was rescheduled for the following day, 11 November, with the kickoff moved to 16:00 local time. The game was goalless until the 34th minute mark, when Ramón Ábila put Boca ahead, only for Lucas Pratto to equalise 90 seconds later. Dario Benedetto then restored Boca's lead, to make the score 2–1 at half-time. However, the game was to end all square at 2–2 after Carlos Izquierdoz scored an own goal for River Plate in the 61st minute.

==== Details ====
11 November 2018
16:00 UTC−3

Boca Juniors (Argentina)	2–2	(Argentina) River Plate
Ábila 34'; Benedetto 45+1'	Report	Pratto 35'; Izquierdoz 61' (o.g.)

Estadio Alberto J. Armando, Buenos Aires
Attendance: 49,000
Referee: Roberto Tobar (Chile)

Boca Juniors	River Plate

GK	12	(Argentina) Agustín Rossi
RB	29	(Argentina) Leonardo Jara	(yellow card) 37'	(substituted off) 83'
CB	21	(Argentina) Carlos Izquierdoz
CB	6	(Argentina) Lisandro Magallán
LB	20	(Uruguay) Lucas Olaza
CM	15	(Uruguay) Nahitan Nández
CM	16	(Colombia) Wílmar Barrios
CM	8	(Argentina) Pablo Pérez (c)
RF	22	(Colombia) Sebastián Villa	(yellow card) 43'	(substituted off) 73'
CF	17	(Argentina) Ramón Ábila	(yellow card) 48'
LF	7	(Argentina) Cristian Pavón		(substituted off) 27'
Substitutes:
GK	28	(Bolivia) Carlos Lampe
DF	2	(Argentina) Paolo Goltz
DF	24	(Argentina) Julio Buffarini		(substituted on) 83'
MF	5	(Argentina) Fernando Gago
FW	18	(Argentina) Darío Benedetto		(substituted on) 27'
FW	19	(Argentina) Mauro Zárate
FW	23	(Argentina) Carlos Tevez	(yellow card) 90+5'	(substituted on) 73'
Manager:
(Argentina) Guillermo Barros Schelotto

GK	1	(Argentina) Franco Armani
CB	2	(Argentina) Jonatan Maidana (c)
CB	28	(Argentina) Lucas Martínez Quarta		(substituted off) 58'
CB	22	(Argentina) Javier Pinola
RWB	29	(Argentina) Gonzalo Montiel
LWB	20	(Argentina) Milton Casco	(yellow card) 67'
CM	15	(Argentina) Exequiel Palacios
CM	24	(Argentina) Enzo Pérez		(substituted off) 75'
CM	10	(Argentina) Gonzalo Martínez		(substituted off) 77'
CF	19	(Colombia) Rafael Santos Borré	(yellow card) 75'
CF	27	(Argentina) Lucas Pratto
Substitutes:
GK	14	(Argentina) Germán Lux
MF	5	(Argentina) Bruno Zuculini		(substituted on) 75'
MF	8	(Colombia) Juan Fernando Quintero		(substituted on) 77'
MF	18	(Uruguay) Camilo Mayada
MF	26	(Argentina) Ignacio Fernández		(substituted on) 58'
FW	7	(Uruguay) Rodrigo Mora
FW	9	(Argentina) Julián Álvarez
Assistant coach:
(Argentina) Matías Biscay (Note: River Plate manager Marcelo Gallardo was given a four-match ban (one-match stadium ban, three-match touchline ban) in CONMEBOL competitions following the semi-final second leg. Assistant manager and compatriot Matías Biscay filled in as manager.)

Assistant referees
Christian Schiemann (Chile)
Claudio Ríos (Chile)
Fourth official
Diego Haro (Peru)
Video assistant referee
Julio Bascuñán (Chile)
Assistant video assistant referees
Piero Maza (Chile)
Carlos Astroza (Chile)

Match rules

- 90 minutes
- Seven named substitutes, of which up to three may be used

=== Second leg ===
==== Violence and relocation to Madrid ====
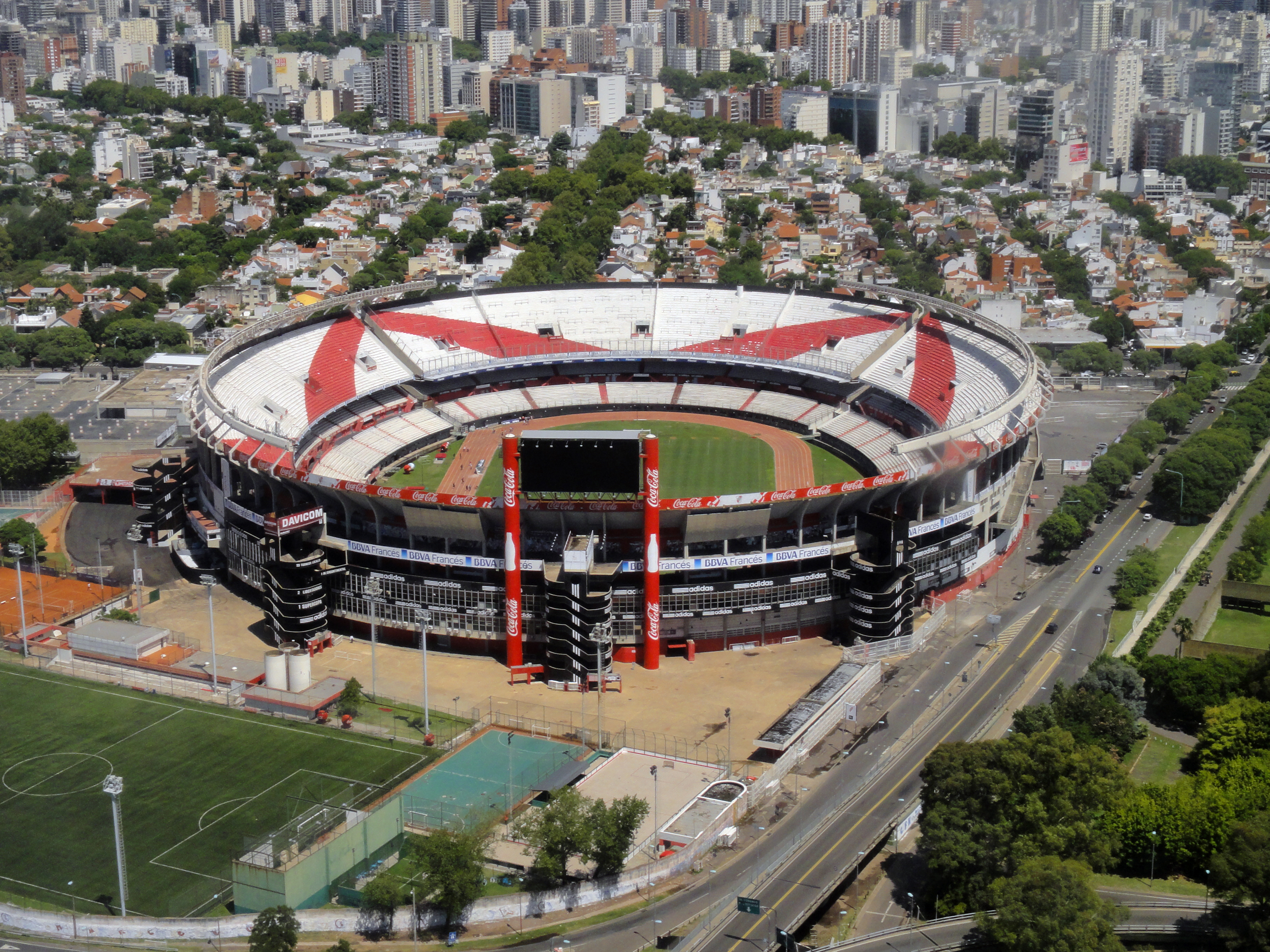
The Estadio Monumental Antonio Vespucio Liberti in Buenos Aires, Argentina, was originally to host the second leg, but the match was moved due to safety concerns following an attack on the Boca Juniors team bus outside the stadium when they were travelling to the original second leg.

Prior to the second leg of the final on 24 November, the Boca Juniors team bus was attacked en route to River Plate's stadium, the Estadio Monumental Antonio Vespucio Liberti. Multiple windows were broken by projectiles thrown from a crowd surrounding the bus, allowing pepper spray to enter the cabin. Several players were injured as a result of the broken glass and pepper spray, with the match delayed by one hour to 18:00 local time. Kickoff was later moved to 18:20 local time, and again to 19:15, before once more being delayed until 19:30. Following the delays, the match was rescheduled for the following day, 25 November, with the same kickoff, 17:00 local time. Former Boca Juniors and River Plate striker Gabriel Batistuta called the attacks "shameful". River Plate was later reprimanded for the bus attack, fined $400,000, and ordered to play two games behind closed doors in the Estadio Monumental.

On 25 November, prior to the rescheduled second leg, Boca Juniors requested that the match be postponed in order for it to be played in "conditions of equality." CONMEBOL postponed the match once more as Boca's requirements could not be guaranteed. On 27 November, CONMEBOL confirmed the second leg would be played outside Argentina due to safety concerns, with the match taking place on 8 or 9 December. Subsequently, on 29 November, CONMEBOL confirmed the match would take place at the Santiago Bernabéu Stadium in Madrid, Spain, on 9 December at 20:30 local time. Real Madrid had offered the Bernabéu free of charge, in order to boost Spain's bid to host the 2030 FIFA World Cup.

For security reasons, prior to the first leg, both clubs unanimously agreed to prohibit away fans from attending either match. However, following the decision by CONMEBOL to move the second leg to Madrid, these plans were altered, with 5,000 tickets allocated to each club. Real Madrid sold 25,000 tickets to fans of each team, as over 250,000 Argentines live and work in Spain, including the Real Madrid manager at the time, Santiago Solari, a former River Plate midfielder. Tickets were also offered to Real Madrid season ticket holders, which sold out quickly. Security responsibilities for the second leg were delegated to the Spanish football federation, rather than CONMEBOL, with Prime Minister Pedro Sánchez saying that plans were underway to have the "necessary deployments to ensure the event is secure".

However, additional concerns were reputedly raised by both clubs following the decision to move the game to Madrid. Leonardo Ponzio, the River Plate captain, was allegedly involved in a match-fixing scandal during his time at Real Zaragoza, and as such his eligibility to play football in Spain was unclear at the time. There were also reports that Boca Juniors intended to appeal the decision to relocate the second leg. In a subsequent press release, River Plate also announced an intent to protest the CONMEBOL decision to play in Madrid. Boca Juniors appealed to the Court of Arbitration for Sport to have the second leg postponed, but was rejected, although the court would continue to consider whether River should be suspended.

==== Summary ====
River Plate lifting the Copa Libertadores trophy

The second leg finally went ahead in front of a crowd of approximately 72,000 in the Bernabéu. Most of the early opportunities fell to Boca, and finally Dario Benedetto, who had also scored in the first leg, scored in the 44th minute to give Boca a half-time lead. In the second half, River Plate fought back and finally equalised after another first-leg scorer, Lucas Pratto, scored in the 68th minute. The match then went to extra time, during which Boca were reduced to 10 men after Wilmar Barrios was sent off. River Plate took advantage, with Juan Quintero putting them into the lead in the 109th minute. An injury to Fernando Gago in the 116th minute, left Boca to just 9 men having used all substitutions. In the final minute Leonardo Jara hit the post for Boca, only for River Plate to break upfield and make the final score 3–1, with Pity Martínez shooting into an empty net. "It's been almost 60 days since this started and there is tremendous sadness," said the Boca manager, Guillermo Barros Schelotto.

==== Details ====
9 December 2018
20:30 UTC+1

River Plate (Argentina)	3–1 (a.e.t.)	(Argentina) Boca Juniors
Pratto 68'; Quintero 109'; G. Martínez 120+2'	Report	Benedetto 44'

Santiago Bernabéu Stadium, Madrid
Attendance: 62,282
Referee: Andrés Cunha (Uruguay)

River Plate	Boca Juniors

GK	1	(Argentina) Franco Armani
RB	29	(Argentina) Gonzalo Montiel		(substituted off) 74'
CB	2	(Argentina) Jonatan Maidana	(yellow card) 83'
CB	22	(Argentina) Javier Pinola
LB	20	(Argentina) Milton Casco	(yellow card) 120+1'
CM	24	(Argentina) Enzo Pérez
CM	23	(Argentina) Leonardo Ponzio (c)	(yellow card) 27'	(substituted off) 58'
RW	26	(Argentina) Ignacio Fernández	(yellow card) 81'	(substituted off) 111'
AM	15	(Argentina) Exequiel Palacios		(substituted off) 97'
LW	10	(Argentina) Gonzalo Martínez
CF	27	(Argentina) Lucas Pratto
Substitutes:
GK	14	(Argentina) Germán Lux
DF	28	(Argentina) Lucas Martínez Quarta
MF	5	(Argentina) Bruno Zuculini		(substituted on) 111'
MF	8	(Colombia) Juan Fernando Quintero		(substituted on) 58'
MF	18	(Uruguay) Camilo Mayada		(substituted on) 74'
FW	7	(Uruguay) Rodrigo Mora
FW	9	(Argentina) Julián Álvarez		(substituted on) 97'
Assistant coach:
(Argentina) Matías Biscay

GK	1	(Argentina) Esteban Andrada
RB	24	(Argentina) Julio Buffarini		(substituted off) 111'
CB	21	(Argentina) Carlos Izquierdoz
CB	6	(Argentina) Lisandro Magallán
LB	20	(Uruguay) Lucas Olaza
CM	15	(Uruguay) Nahitan Nández
CM	16	(Colombia) Wílmar Barrios	(yellow card) 87' (yellow-red card) 92'
CM	8	(Argentina) Pablo Pérez (c)	(yellow card) 43'	(substituted off) 89'
RF	22	(Colombia) Sebastián Villa		(substituted off) 96'
CF	18	(Argentina) Darío Benedetto		(substituted off) 62'
LF	7	(Argentina) Cristian Pavón
Substitutes:
GK	12	(Argentina) Agustín Rossi
DF	2	(Argentina) Paolo Goltz
DF	29	(Argentina) Leonardo Jara		(substituted on) 96'
MF	5	(Argentina) Fernando Gago		(substituted on) 89'
FW	17	(Argentina) Ramón Ábila		(substituted on) 62'
FW	19	(Argentina) Mauro Zárate
FW	23	(Argentina) Carlos Tevez	(yellow card) 120+1'	(substituted on) 111'
Manager:
(Argentina) Guillermo Barros Schelotto

Assistant referees
Nicolás Taran (Uruguay)
Mauricio Espinosa (Uruguay)
Fourth official
Víctor Carrillo (Peru)
Video assistant referee
Leodán González (Uruguay)
Assistant video assistant referees
Esteban Ostojich (Uruguay)
Richard Trinidad (Uruguay)

Match rules

- 90 minutes
- 30 minutes of extra time if necessary (no away goals rule applied)
- Penalty shoot-out if scores still level
- Seven named substitutes
- Maximum of three substitutions, with a fourth allowed in extra time

== See also ==
- 2018 Copa Sudamericana finals
- 2019 Recopa Sudamericana
- 2018 FIFA Club World Cup
- 2018–19 Club Atlético River Plate season
- 2018–19 Club Atlético Boca Juniors season
