= Federico Ramos (footballer) =

Uruguayan footballer (born 1991)

Personal information
- Full name: Leonardo Federico Ramos Melgar
- Date of birth: 16 September 1991 (age 35)
- Place of birth: Piriápolis, Uruguay
- Height: 1.69 m (5 ft 7 in)
- Position: Midfielder

Team information
- Current team: Deportivo Maldonado

Youth career
- Miramar Misiones

Senior career*
Years	Team	Apps	(Gls)
-2015	Miramar Misiones	44+	(3+)
2015	Liga de Portoviejo		
2016-2018	Atenas	50	(11)
2017	→ Plaza Colonia (loan)	28	(4)
2019-	Deportivo Maldonado	62	(3)
- * Club domestic league appearances and goals

Leonardo Federico Ramos Melgar (born 16 September 1991) is a Uruguayan footballer who plays as a midfielder for Deportivo Maldonado.

== Career ==
Ramos started his career with Uruguayan second division side Miramar Misiones, helping them earn promotion to the Uruguayan top flight. In 2015, Ramos signed for Liga de Portoviejo in the Ecuadorean second division, where he said, "[the manager] asked us to infect the Ecuadorian players a little, because they were cold. For them it was the same to win as to lose and I with two other Uruguayans –Javier Guarino and Diego Torres– tried to change their mentality and we saved ourselves from relegation."

Before the 2016 season, Ramos signed for Uruguayan second division club Atenas, where he made 50 league appearances and scored 11 goals. On 6 March 2016, he debuted for Atenas during a 2-4 loss to Rampla Juniors. On 27 March 2016, Ramos scored his first goal for Atenas during a 1-1 draw with Boston River.

before the 2017 season, he was sent on loan to Plaza Colonia in the Uruguayan top flight. Before the 2019 season, Ramos signed for Uruguayan second division team Deportivo Maldonado, helping them earn promotion to the Uruguayan top flight.
