= Gonzalo Ramos =

Gonzalo Ramos may refer to:

- Gonzalo Ramos (actor) (born 1989), Spanish actor
- Gonzalo Ramos (footballer) (born 1991), Uruguayan footballer

== See also ==
- Gonçalo Ramos (born 2001), Portuguese footballer
