= Matías Biscay =

Argentine footballer

Personal information
- Date of birth: 5 March 1974 (age 52)
- Place of birth: San Fernando, Argentina
- Height: 1.80 m (5 ft 11 in)
- Positions: Defender; midfielder

Team information
- Current team: River Plate (first-team coach)

Youth career
- River Plate

Senior career*
Years	Team	Apps	(Gls)
1995–1996	River Plate	5	(0)
1996–1998	Huracán	40	(7)
1998–1999	Lugano	7	(0)
1999–2001	Compostela	44	(1)
Total		96	(8)
- * Club domestic league appearances and goals

Matías Biscay (born 5 March 1974) is an Argentinian former professional footballer who is first-team coach of River Plate.

== Playing career ==
Biscay began his career at River Plate, playing five Primera División games and winning the 1996 Copa Libertadores, before moving to fellow Buenos Aires-based club Huracán. Biscay's stay at Huracán lasted two seasons, playing 40 times in the Primera División, scoring seven.

In 1998, Biscay moved to Europe to play for Swiss club Lugano, making seven league appearances for Lugano. In 1999, Biscay signed for Spanish club Compostela, playing 44 times in the Segunda División, scoring once. Biscay retired at the age of 28, following legal issues with Compostela.

== Coaching career ==
In 2011, Biscay was appointed assistant manager of Uruguayan club Nacional.

In 2014, Biscay moved to former club River Plate, taking up the role of assistant manager. In 2018, following the suspension of manager Marcelo Gallardo, Biscay filled in as River Plate manager in the 2018 Copa Libertadores Finals against rivals Boca Juniors.
