= Sebastián Riquelme =

Argentine footballer

Personal information
- Full name: Ricardo Sebastián Riquelme
- Date of birth: 28 September 1996 (age 30)
- Place of birth: San Fernando, Argentina
- Height: 1.72 m (5 ft 8 in)
- Position: Attacking midfielder

Youth career
- 2008–2016: Argentinos Juniors

Senior career*
Years	Team	Apps	(Gls)
2016–2019	Argentinos Juniors	2	(0)
2017	→ Danubio (loan)	0	(0)
2018	→ Unión San Felipe (loan)	8	(1)
2019–2020	Barracas Central	1	(0)
2020	El Ejido	2	(0)
2020	Atenas	17	(0)
2021	Atlanta	11	(2)
2021	San Telmo	10	(0)
2022	Acassuso	1	(0)
- * Club domestic league appearances and goals as of 14:00, 1 August 2022 (UTC)

Ricardo Sebastián Riquelme (born 28 September 1996) is an Argentine professional footballer who plays as an attacking midfielder.

== Career ==
Riquelme's career started with Argentinos Juniors in 2008. He was promoted in their senior squad in 2016, making his bow in a 4–0 defeat to Unión Santa Fe on 6 May; he had previously been an unused substitute for matches with Aldosivi and Vélez Sarsfield. In 2017, Riquelme joined Danubio of the Uruguayan Primera División on loan. However, he returned months later without featuring. On 9 June 2018, Primera B de Chile side Unión San Felipe loaned Riquelme. After his debut on 21 July versus Deportes Puerto Montt, he scored his first goal in a win away to Deportes Copiapó on 30 September.

On 11 January 2019, Riquelme terminated his contract with Argentinos Juniors. He soon joined Barracas Central of Primera B Nacional, prior to departing in January 2020 to Spanish Tercera División outfit El Ejido. He debuted on 23 February during a four-goal victory against Atlético Porcuna, before making another appearance two weeks later versus Ciudad de Torredonjimeno; the season was soon stopped due to the COVID-19 pandemic. In August 2020, Riquelme made a return to Uruguay as he penned terms with Segunda División team Atenas. Seventeen appearances followed in the 2020 campaign.

In February 2021, Riquelme went back to his homeland to have trials with Primera Nacional duo Almirante Brown and Atlanta. He was given a contract by the latter on 27 February. Later that year, he had a spell at San Telmo, before he in mid-February 2022 joined Primera B Metropolitana side Acassuso. However, he only managed to play one game before it was confirmed on 5 April 2022, that he have had his contract terminated by mutual agreement, given the lack of minutes.

== Personal life ==
Riquelme is the brother of ex-professional footballer Juan Román Riquelme, a former international for the Argentina national team.

== Career statistics ==
As of 27 February 2021

Appearances and goals by club, season and competition
Club	Season	League			National cup		League cup		Continental		Other		Total	
Club	Season	Division	Apps	Goals	Apps	Goals	Apps	Goals	Apps	Goals	Apps	Goals	Apps	Goals
Argentinos Juniors	2016	Argentine Primera División	1	0	0	0	—		—		0	0	1	0
Argentinos Juniors	2016–17	Primera B Nacional	0	0	0	0	—		—		0	0	0	0
Argentinos Juniors	2017–18	Argentine Primera División	1	0	0	0	—		—		0	0	1	0
Argentinos Juniors	2018–19	Argentine Primera División	0	0	0	0	—		—		0	0	0	0
Argentinos Juniors	Total		2	0	0	0	—		—		0	0	2	0
Danubio (loan)	2017	Uruguayan Primera División	0	0	—		—		0	0	0	0	0	0
Unión San Felipe (loan)	2018	Primera B de Chile	8	1	0	0	—		—		0	0	8	1
Barracas Central	2019–20	Primera B Nacional	1	0	0	0	—		—		0	0	1	0
El Ejido	2019–20	Tercera División	2	0	0	0	—		—		0	0	2	0
Atenas	2020	Uruguayan Segunda División	17	0	—		—		—		0	0	17	0
Atlanta	2021	Primera Nacional	0	0	0	0	—		—		0	0	0	0
Career total			30	1	0	0	—		0	0	0	0	30	1
