= 2018 Copa Libertadores final stages =

The 2018 Copa Libertadores final stages were played from 7 August to 9 December 2018. A total of 16 teams competed in the final stages to decide the champions of the 2018 Copa Libertadores.

== Qualified teams ==
The winners and runners-up of each of the eight groups in the group stage advanced to the round of 16.

Group	Winners	Runners-up
A	(Brazil) Grêmio	(Paraguay) Cerro Porteño
B	(Colombia) Atlético Nacional	(Chile) Colo-Colo
C	(Paraguay) Libertad	(Argentina) Atlético Tucumán
D	(Argentina) River Plate	(Brazil) Flamengo
E	(Brazil) Cruzeiro	(Argentina) Racing
F	(Brazil) Santos	(Argentina) Estudiantes
G	(Brazil) Corinthians	(Argentina) Independiente
H	(Brazil) Palmeiras	(Argentina) Boca Juniors

=== Seeding ===
Starting from the round of 16, the teams were seeded according to their results in the group stage, with the group winners (Pot 1 in round of 16 draw) seeded 1–8, and the group runners-up (Pot 2 in round of 16 draw) seeded 9–16.

Seed	Grp	Team	Pld	W	D	L	GF	GA	GD	Pts	Round of 16 draw
1	H	(Brazil) Palmeiras	6	5	1	0	14	3	+11	16	Pot 1
2	A	(Brazil) Grêmio	6	4	2	0	13	2	+11	14	Pot 1
3	C	(Paraguay) Libertad	6	4	1	1	10	4	+6	13	Pot 1
4	D	(Argentina) River Plate	6	3	3	0	6	3	+3	12	Pot 1
5	E	(Brazil) Cruzeiro	6	3	2	1	15	5	+10	11	Pot 1
6	G	(Brazil) Corinthians	6	3	1	2	11	5	+6	10	Pot 1
7	B	(Colombia) Atlético Nacional	6	3	1	2	9	3	+6	10	Pot 1
8	F	(Brazil) Santos	6	3	1	2	6	4	+2	10	Pot 1
9	A	(Paraguay) Cerro Porteño	6	4	1	1	8	8	0	13	Pot 2
10	E	(Argentina) Racing	6	3	2	1	12	6	+6	11	Pot 2
11	D	(Brazil) Flamengo	6	2	4	0	7	4	+3	10	Pot 2
12	G	(Argentina) Independiente	6	3	1	2	6	4	+2	10	Pot 2
13	C	(Argentina) Atlético Tucumán	6	3	1	2	7	6	+1	10	Pot 2
14	H	(Argentina) Boca Juniors	6	2	3	1	8	4	+4	9	Pot 2
15	F	(Argentina) Estudiantes	6	2	2	2	6	4	+2	8	Pot 2
16	B	(Chile) Colo-Colo	6	2	2	2	5	5	0	8	Pot 2

Source: CONMEBOL
Rules for classification: 1) Higher position in group; 2) Points; 3) Goal difference; 4) Goals scored; 5) Away goals scored; 6) CONMEBOL ranking (Regulations Article 22.i).

== Format ==
Starting from the round of 16, the teams played a single-elimination tournament with the following rules:

- Each tie was played on a home-and-away two-legged basis, with the higher-seeded team hosting the second leg (Regulations Article 23).
- In the round of 16, quarter-finals, and semi-finals, if tied on aggregate, the away goals rule was used. If still tied, extra time was not played, and a penalty shoot-out was used to determine the winner (Regulations Article 29).
- In the finals, if tied on aggregate, the away goals rule was not used, and 30 minutes of extra time were played. If still tied after extra time, a penalty shoot-out was used to determine the winner (Regulations Article 30).

== Draw ==
The draw for the round of 16 was held on 4 June 2018, 20:00 PYT (UTC−4), at the CONMEBOL Convention Centre in Luque, Paraguay. For the round of 16, the 16 teams were drawn into eight ties (A–H) between a group winner (Pot 1) and a group runner-up (Pot 2), with the group winners hosting the second leg. Teams from the same association or the same group could be drawn into the same tie.

== Bracket ==
The bracket starting from the round of 16 was determined as follows:

Round	Matchups
Round of 16	(Group winners host second leg, matchups decided by draw): Match A; Match B; Match C; Match D; Match E; Match F; Match G; Match H
Quarter-finals	(Higher-seeded team host second leg): Match S1: Winner A vs. Winner H; Match S2: Winner B vs. Winner G; Match S3: Winner C vs. Winner F; Match S4: Winner D vs. Winner E
Semi-finals	(Higher-seeded team host second leg): Match F1: Winner S1 vs. Winner S4; Match F2: Winner S2 vs. Winner S3
Finals	(Higher-seeded team host second leg): Winner F1 vs. Winner F2

The bracket was decided based on the round of 16 draw, which was held on 4 June 2018.

Round of 16
14	(Argentina) Boca Juniors	2	4	6
3	(Paraguay) Libertad	0	2	2
11	(Brazil) Flamengo	0	1	1
5	(Brazil) Cruzeiro	2	0	2
16	(Chile) Colo-Colo (a)	1	1	2
6	(Brazil) Corinthians	0	2	2
9	(Paraguay) Cerro Porteño	0	1	1
1	(Brazil) Palmeiras	2	0	2
12	(Argentina) Independiente	3	0	3
8	(Brazil) Santos	0	0	0
10	(Argentina) Racing	0	0	0
4	(Argentina) River Plate	0	3	3
13	(Argentina) Atlético Tucumán	2	0	2
7	(Colombia) Atlético Nacional	0	1	1
15	(Argentina) Estudiantes	2	1	3 (3)
2	(Brazil) Grêmio (p)	1	2	3 (5)

Quarter-finals
14	(Argentina) Boca Juniors	2	1	3
5	(Brazil) Cruzeiro	0	1	1
16	(Chile) Colo-Colo	0	0	0
1	(Brazil) Palmeiras	2	2	4
12	(Argentina) Independiente	0	1	1
4	(Argentina) River Plate	0	3	3
13	(Argentina) Atlético Tucumán	0	0	0
2	(Brazil) Grêmio	2	4	6

Semi-finals
14	(Argentina) Boca Juniors	2	2	4
1	(Brazil) Palmeiras	0	2	2
4	(Argentina) River Plate (a)	0	2	2
2	(Brazil) Grêmio	1	1	2

Finals
14	(Argentina) Boca Juniors	2	1	3
4	(Argentina) River Plate	2	3	5

== Round of 16 ==
The first legs were played on 7–9 and 21 August, and the second legs were played on 28–30 August 2018.

Team 1	Agg.	Team 2	1st leg	2nd leg
Racing (Argentina)	0–3	(Argentina) River Plate	0–0	0–3
Colo-Colo (Chile)	2–2 (a)	(Brazil) Corinthians	1–0	1–2
Flamengo (Brazil)	1–2	(Brazil) Cruzeiro	0–2	1–0
Estudiantes (Argentina)	3–3 (3–5 p)	(Brazil) Grêmio	2–1	1–2
Atlético Tucumán (Argentina)	2–1	(Colombia) Atlético Nacional	2–0	0–1
Boca Juniors (Argentina)	6–2	(Paraguay) Libertad	2–0	4–2
Cerro Porteño (Paraguay)	1–2	(Brazil) Palmeiras	0–2	1–0
Independiente (Argentina)	3–0	(Brazil) Santos	3–0	0–0

Notes

1. CONMEBOL awarded Independiente a 3–0 win as a result of Santos fielding the ineligible player Carlos Sánchez. The match originally ended 0–0.
2. Match abandoned after 81 minutes due to crowd trouble, with the score 0–0 at the time.

=== Match A ===
9 August 2018
19:30 UTC−3

Racing (Argentina)	0–0	(Argentina) River Plate
	Report

Estadio Presidente Juan Domingo Perón, Avellaneda
Referee: Anderson Daronco (Brazil)

29 August 2018
19:30 UTC−3

River Plate (Argentina)	3–0	(Argentina) Racing
Pratto 10'; Palacios 27'; Borré 80'	Report

Estadio Monumental Antonio Vespucio Liberti, Buenos Aires
Referee: Mario Díaz de Vivar (Paraguay)

River Plate won 3–0 on aggregate and advanced to the quarterfinals (Match S1).

=== Match B ===
8 August 2018
20:45 UTC−4

Colo-Colo (Chile)	1–0	(Brazil) Corinthians
Carmona 37'	Report

Estadio Monumental David Arellano, Santiago
Referee: Wilmar Roldán (Colombia)

29 August 2018
21:45 UTC−3

Corinthians (Brazil)	2–1	(Chile) Colo-Colo
Jádson 16' (pen.); Roger 63'	Report	Barrios 31'

Arena Corinthians, São Paulo
Attendance: 38,112
Referee: Néstor Pitana (Argentina)

Tied 2–2 on aggregate, Colo-Colo won on away goals and advanced to the quarterfinals (Match S2).

=== Match C ===
8 August 2018
21:45 UTC−3

Flamengo (Brazil)	0–2	(Brazil) Cruzeiro
	Report	De Arrascaeta 9'; Thiago Neves 77'

Estádio do Maracanã, Rio de Janeiro
Attendance: 45,967
Referee: Néstor Pitana (Argentina)

29 August 2018
21:45 UTC−3

Cruzeiro (Brazil)	0–1	(Brazil) Flamengo
	Report	Léo Duarte 69'

Estádio Mineirão, Belo Horizonte
Referee: Andrés Cunha (Uruguay)

Cruzeiro won 2–1 on aggregate and advanced to the quarterfinals (Match S3).

=== Match D ===
7 August 2018
21:45 UTC−3

Estudiantes (Argentina)	2–1	(Brazil) Grêmio
Apaolaza 8'; Campi 37'	Report	Kannemann 43'

Estadio Centenario Ciudad de Quilmes, Quilmes (Note: Estudiantes played their home match against Grêmio at Estadio Centenario Ciudad de Quilmes, Quilmes, instead of their regular stadium Estadio Ciudad de La Plata, La Plata.)
Referee: Andrés Cunha (Uruguay)

28 August 2018
21:45 UTC−3

Grêmio (Brazil)	2–1	(Argentina) Estudiantes
Éverton 5'; Alisson 90+2'	Report	Rodríguez 8'
Penalties
Maicon (penalty scored); Éverton (penalty scored); Jael (penalty scored); Alisson (penalty scored); André (penalty scored)	5–3	(penalty scored) Rodríguez; (penalty missed) Campi; (penalty scored) Noguera; (penalty scored) Lugüercio

Arena do Grêmio, Porto Alegre
Attendance: 48,082
Referee: Éber Aquino (Paraguay)

Tied 3–3 on aggregate, Grêmio won on penalties and advanced to the quarterfinals (Match S4).

=== Match E ===
9 August 2018
21:45 UTC−3

Atlético Tucumán (Argentina)	2–0	(Colombia) Atlético Nacional
Díaz 7'; Acosta 70'	Report

Estadio Monumental José Fierro, Tucumán
Referee: Éber Aquino (Paraguay)

28 August 2018
19:45 UTC−5

Atlético Nacional (Colombia)	1–0	(Argentina) Atlético Tucumán
Duarte 11'	Report

Estadio Atanasio Girardot, Medellín
Referee: Roberto Tobar (Chile)

Atlético Tucumán won 2–1 on aggregate and advanced to the quarterfinals (Match S4).

=== Match F ===
8 August 2018
19:30 UTC−3

Boca Juniors (Argentina)	2–0	(Paraguay) Libertad
Ábila 6'; Zárate 42'	Report

Estadio Alberto J. Armando, Buenos Aires
Referee: Wilton Sampaio (Brazil)

30 August 2018
18:30 UTC−4

Libertad (Paraguay)	2–4	(Argentina) Boca Juniors
Ó. Cardozo 11', 38' (pen.)	Report	Pavón 18'; Zárate 21'; Tévez 74'; Cardona 79' (pen.)

Estadio Defensores del Chaco, Asunción (Note: Libertad played their home match against Boca Juniors at Estadio Defensores del Chaco, Asunción, instead of their regular stadium Estadio Dr. Nicolás Léoz, Asunción.)
Referee: Wilmar Roldán (Colombia)

Boca Juniors won 6–2 on aggregate and advanced to the quarterfinals (Match S3).

=== Match G ===
9 August 2018
20:45 UTC−4

Cerro Porteño (Paraguay)	0–2	(Brazil) Palmeiras
	Report	Borja 46', 70'

Estadio General Pablo Rojas, Asunción
Referee: Fernando Rapallini (Argentina)

30 August 2018
21:45 UTC−3

Palmeiras (Brazil)	0–1	(Paraguay) Cerro Porteño
	Report	Arzamendia 56'

Allianz Parque, São Paulo
Attendance: 33,204
Referee: Germán Delfino (Argentina)

Palmeiras won 2–1 on aggregate and advanced to the quarterfinals (Match S2).

=== Match H ===
21 August 2018
21:45 UTC−3

Independiente (Argentina)	3–0 Awarded	(Brazil) Santos
	Report

Estadio Libertadores de América, Avellaneda
Referee: Diego Haro (Peru)

28 August 2018
19:30 UTC−3

Santos (Brazil)	0–0	(Argentina) Independiente
	Report

Estádio do Pacaembu, São Paulo (Note: Santos played their home match against Independiente at Estádio do Pacaembu, São Paulo, instead of their regular stadium Estádio Urbano Caldeira, Santos.)
Attendance: 33,642
Referee: Julio Bascuñán (Chile)

Independiente won 3–0 on aggregate and advanced to the quarterfinals (Match S1).

== Quarter-finals ==
The first legs were played on 18–20 September, and the second legs were played on 2–4 October 2018.

Team 1	Agg.	Team 2	1st leg	2nd leg
Independiente (Argentina)	1–3	(Argentina) River Plate	0–0	1–3
Colo-Colo (Chile)	0–4	(Brazil) Palmeiras	0–2	0–2
Boca Juniors (Argentina)	3–1	(Brazil) Cruzeiro	2–0	1–1
Atlético Tucumán (Argentina)	0–6	(Brazil) Grêmio	0–2	0–4

=== Match S1 ===
19 September 2018
19:30 UTC−3

Independiente (Argentina)	0–0	(Argentina) River Plate
	Report

Estadio Libertadores de América, Avellaneda
Referee: Wilton Sampaio (Brazil)

2 October 2018
19:30 UTC−3

River Plate (Argentina)	3–1	(Argentina) Independiente
Scocco 46'; Quintero 68'; Borré 84'	Report	S. Romero 54'

Estadio Monumental Antonio Vespucio Liberti, Buenos Aires
Referee: Anderson Daronco (Brazil)

River Plate won 3–1 on aggregate and advanced to the semifinals (Match F1).

=== Match S2 ===
20 September 2018
21:45 UTC−3

Colo-Colo (Chile)	0–2	(Brazil) Palmeiras
	Report	Bruno Henrique 2'; Dudu 77'

Estadio Monumental David Arellano, Santiago
Referee: Andrés Cunha (Uruguay)

3 October 2018
21:45 UTC−3

Palmeiras (Brazil)	2–0	(Chile) Colo-Colo
Dudu 36'; Borja 52' (pen.)	Report

Allianz Parque, São Paulo
Attendance: 37,950
Referee: Wilmar Roldán (Colombia)

Palmeiras won 4–0 on aggregate and advanced to the semifinals (Match F2).

=== Match S3 ===
19 September 2018
21:45 UTC−3

Boca Juniors (Argentina)	2–0	(Brazil) Cruzeiro
Zárate 35'; Pérez 81'	Report

Estadio Alberto J. Armando, Buenos Aires
Referee: Éber Aquino (Paraguay)

4 October 2018
21:45 UTC−3

Cruzeiro (Brazil)	1–1	(Argentina) Boca Juniors
Sassá 57'	Report	Pavón 90+3'

Estádio Mineirão, Belo Horizonte
Attendance: 56,791
Referee: Andrés Cunha (Uruguay)

Boca Juniors won 3–1 on aggregate and advanced to the semifinals (Match F2).

=== Match S4 ===
18 September 2018
21:45 UTC−3

Atlético Tucumán (Argentina)	0–2	(Brazil) Grêmio
	Report	Alisson 34'; Éverton 54'

Estadio Monumental José Fierro, Tucumán
Referee: Wilmar Roldán (Colombia)

2 October 2018
21:45 UTC−3

Grêmio (Brazil)	4–0	(Argentina) Atlético Tucumán
Luan 35'; Cícero 44' (pen.); Mercier 52' (o.g.); Jael 90+1' (pen.)	Report

Arena do Grêmio, Porto Alegre
Attendance: 47,304
Referee: Roberto Tobar (Chile)

Grêmio won 6–0 on aggregate and advanced to the semifinals (Match F1).

== Semi-finals ==
The first legs were played on 23–24 October, and the second legs were played on 30–31 October 2018.

Team 1	Agg.	Team 2	1st leg	2nd leg
River Plate (Argentina)	2–2 (a)	(Brazil) Grêmio	0–1	2–1
Boca Juniors (Argentina)	4–2	(Brazil) Palmeiras	2–0	2–2

=== Match F1 ===
23 October 2018
21:45 UTC−3

River Plate (Argentina)	0–1	(Brazil) Grêmio
	Report	Michel 61'

Estadio Monumental Antonio Vespucio Liberti, Buenos Aires
Referee: Víctor Carrillo (Peru)

30 October 2018
21:45 UTC−3

Grêmio (Brazil)	1–2	(Argentina) River Plate
Léo Gomes 35'	Report	Borré 81'; Martínez 90+4' (pen.)

Arena do Grêmio, Porto Alegre
Attendance: 53,571
Referee: Andrés Cunha (Uruguay)

Tied 2–2 on aggregate, River Plate won on away goals and advanced to the finals.

=== Match F2 ===
24 October 2018
21:45 UTC−3

Boca Juniors (Argentina)	2–0	(Brazil) Palmeiras
Benedetto 83', 87'	Report

Estadio Alberto J. Armando, Buenos Aires
Referee: Roberto Tobar (Chile)

31 October 2018
21:45 UTC−3

Palmeiras (Brazil)	2–2	(Argentina) Boca Juniors
Luan 52'; Gómez 60' (pen.)	Report	Ábila 17'; Benedetto 69'

Allianz Parque, São Paulo
Attendance: 40,299
Referee: Wilmar Roldán (Colombia)

Boca Juniors won 4–2 on aggregate and advanced to the finals.

== Finals ==
In the finals, if tied on aggregate, the away goals rule was not used, and 30 minutes of extra time were played. If still tied after extra time, a penalty shoot-out was used to determine the winner (Regulations Article 30).

The first leg was played on 11 November (originally scheduled on 10 November, but postponed due to rain), and the second leg was played on 9 December 2018 (originally scheduled on 24 November, but postponed due to safety concerns following an attack on the Boca Juniors team bus prior to the original scheduled match).

11 November 2018 (Note: The Boca Juniors v River Plate match, originally scheduled on 10 November 2018, 17:00 UTC−3, was postponed to the following day due to a waterlogged pitch.)
16:00 UTC−3

Boca Juniors (Argentina)	2–2	(Argentina) River Plate
Ábila 34'; Benedetto 45+1'	Report	Pratto 35'; Izquierdoz 61' (o.g.)

Estadio Alberto J. Armando, Buenos Aires
Attendance: 49,000
Referee: Roberto Tobar (Chile)

9 December 2018 (Note: The River Plate v Boca Juniors match, originally scheduled on 24 November 2018, 17:00 UTC−3, was postponed to 9 December 2018 due to an attack on the Boca Juniors team bus when several players were injured.)
20:30 UTC+1

River Plate (Argentina)	3–1 (a.e.t.)	(Argentina) Boca Juniors
Pratto 68'; Quintero 109'; G. Martínez 120+2'	Report	Benedetto 44'

Santiago Bernabéu Stadium, Madrid (Note: The River Plate v Boca Juniors match, originally scheduled to be hosted by River Plate at the Estadio Monumental Antonio Vespucio Liberti, Buenos Aires, took place in Spain at the Santiago Bernabéu Stadium, Madrid due to safety concerns.)
Attendance: 62,282
Referee: Andrés Cunha (Uruguay)

River Plate won 5–3 on aggregate.
