= Facundo Taborda =

Argentine footballer

Personal information
- Date of birth: 8 June 1995 (age 31)
- Place of birth: América, Argentina
- Height: 1.68 m (5 ft 6 in)
- Position: Midfielder

Youth career
- Atlético Rivadavia
- Barrio Norte
- Independiente de América
- Boca Juniors

Senior career*
Years	Team	Apps	(Gls)
2016–2018	Boca Juniors	0	(0)
2016	→ Juventud Unida (loan)	6	(0)
2017	→ Cerro Largo (loan)	0	(0)
2017–2018	→ Defensa y Justicia (loan)	0	(0)
2018–2020	Zacatepec	20	(1)
2020	Atenas	16	(3)
2021	Atlanta	16	(0)
2022	Flandria	16	(0)
2023	Acassuso	22	(0)
- * Club domestic league appearances and goals as of 18:18, 14 June 2025 (UTC)

Facundo Taborda (born 8 June 1995) is an Argentine professional footballer who plays as a midfielder.

== Career ==
Boca Juniors signed Taborda from Atlético Rivadavia, after he had spells with Barrio Norte and Independiente de América. He was loaned out by Boca Juniors in 2016, joining Primera B Nacional's Juventud Unida Universitario. He made his pro debut on 6 February 2016 against Independiente Rivadavia, which was the first of six appearances for them. A year later, Uruguayan Segunda División side Cerro Largo loaned Taborda. Taborda joined Defensa y Justicia of the Argentine Primera División on loan in August 2017, though left in August 2018 to Ascenso MX club Zacatepec.

His first appearance in Mexican football arrived on 19 October 2018 versus Potros UAEM. After one goal, against Correcaminos UAT, in twenty-five total matches for Zacatepec, Taborda left in mid-2020 to return to Uruguay with Atenas. He scored goals against Villa Española, Albion and Villa Teresa during a run of sixteen appearances up until the end of November. With the 2020 season over, Taborda went on to depart and sign with homeland team Atlanta on 25 February 2021. On 28 January 2022, Taborda moved to Flandria.

== Career statistics ==
As of 26 February 2021.

Club statistics
Club	Season	League			Cup		League Cup		Continental		Other		Total	
Club	Season	Division	Apps	Goals	Apps	Goals	Apps	Goals	Apps	Goals	Apps	Goals	Apps	Goals
Boca Juniors	2016	Primera División	0	0	0	0	—		0	0	0	0	0	0
Boca Juniors	2016–17	Primera División	0	0	0	0	—		0	0	0	0	0	0
Boca Juniors	2017–18	Primera División	0	0	0	0	—		0	0	0	0	0	0
Boca Juniors	Total		0	0	0	0	—		0	0	0	0	0	0
Juventud Unida Universitario (loan)	2016	Primera B Nacional	6	0	2	0	—		—		0	0	8	0
Cerro Largo (loan)	2017	Segunda División	0	0	—		—		—		0	0	0	0
Defensa y Justicia (loan)	2017–18	Primera División	0	0	0	0	—		0	0	0	0	0	0
Zacatepec	2018–19	Ascenso MX	12	1	2	0	—		—		0	0	14	1
Zacatepec	2019–20	Ascenso MX	8	0	3	0	—		—		0	0	11	0
Zacatepec	Total		20	1	5	0	—		0	0	0	0	25	1
Atenas	2020	Segunda División	16	3	—		—		—		0	0	16	3
Atlanta	2021	Primera Nacional	0	0	—		—		—		0	0	0	0
Career total			42	4	7	0	—		0	0	0	0	49	4
