= Gonzalo Maulela =

Uruguayan footballer (born 1984)

Gonzalo Maulella
Personal information
- Full name: Gonzalo Matías Maulella Rodríguez
- Date of birth: 6 July 1984 (age 42)
- Place of birth: Paysandú, Uruguay
- Height: 1.84 m (6 ft 0 in)
- Position: Centre back

Team information
- Current team: Atenas
- Number: 21

Youth career
- 1999–2001: Paysandú Bella Vista
- 2001–2005: Defensor Sporting

Senior career*
Years	Team	Apps	(Gls)
2005–2007	Defensor Sporting	8	(0)
2008–2009	Central Español	14	(0)
2009–2010	Brindisi	10	(1)
2010–2011	Santa Comba		
2011–2012	Rentistas	24	(0)
2012–2013	Sportivo Luqueño	37	(0)
2014	Real Garcilaso	43	(4)
2015	Ayacucho FC		
2016	Defensor La Bocana	33	(1)
2017–2018	Defensor Sporting	57	(3)
2019	Liverpool Montevideo	8	(1)
2020–	Atenas	12	(0)
- * Club domestic league appearances and goals as of 20:21, 26 June 2019 (UTC)

Gonzalo Matías Maulella Rodríguez (born July 6, 1984) is a Uruguayan footballer who plays as a defender for Atenas de San Carlos.

== Career ==
Maulella joined Italy's Lega Pro Seconda Divisione side S.S.D. Città di Brindisi in November 2009.
