= Gonzalo Ramos (footballer) =

Uruguayan footballer (born 1991)

Personal information
- Full name: Gonzalo Ramos Deféminis
- Date of birth: 16 May 1991 (age 35)
- Place of birth: Montevideo, Uruguay
- Height: 1.77 m (5 ft 10 in)
- Position: Attacking midfielder

Team information
- Current team: Atenas
- Number: 40

Youth career
- Nacional

Senior career*
Years	Team	Apps	(Gls)
2013–2015	Nacional	7	(2)
2015–2017	Cerro	36	(10)
2017	Puebla	0	(0)
2017	Fénix	6	(1)
2018	Racing Montevideo	15	(0)
2019	Carlos A. Mannucci	12	(1)
2020–	Atenas	4	(1)
- * Club domestic league appearances and goals

Gonzalo Ramos Deféminis (born 16 May 1991) is a Uruguayan footballer who plays as an attacking midfielder or playmaker for Atenas.
