= Atenas de San Carlos =

Association football club in Uruguay

Atenas
- Full name: Club Atlético Atenas de San Carlos
- Nicknames: Azulgranas; Atenienses; Negros
- Founded: 1 May 1928; 98 years ago
- Ground: Estadio Atenas San Carlos; Maldonado, Uruguay
- Capacity: 8,000
- Owner: Grupo Pachuca
- Chairman: Rodrigo Santos
- Manager: José Antonio Castro
- League: Segunda División
- 2025: Segunda División, 3rd of 14
- Website: https://clubatenas.uy/
Home colours	Away colours

Club Atlético Atenas de San Carlos is a football club from San Carlos, Maldonado in Uruguay. They currently play in the Uruguayan Segunda División.

== History ==
Atenas played two seasons in the Uruguayan Primera División, 2009–10 and 2014–15. Their debut at the second level was on 5 May 2002. That day they played against Racing Club de Montevideo, drawing the game 1–1.

They are the most successful team from outside Montevideo, having won many tournaments in their regional league, and are one of the top-winners of the Campeonato de Clubes Campeones del Interior (the national tournament for Uruguayan amateur clubs).

== Honours ==
=== Local ===
- Liga Carolina de Fútbol (San Carlos): 23
  - 1954, 1961, 1962, 1963, 1964, 1965, 1966, 1969, 1970, 1971, 1973, 1974, 1978, 1979, 1985, 1986, 1987, 1988, 1989, 1990, 1991, 1992, 1993

=== Departmental ===
- Campeonato Departamental de Maldonado: 12
  - 1957, 1964, 1970, 1971, 1973, 1974, 1984, 1985, 1988, 1990, 1991, 1993
- Liga Mayor de Maldonado: 3
  - 1995, 1996, 2000

=== Regional ===
- Campeonato del Este: 4
  - 1965, 1975, 1985, 1986

=== National ===
- Campeonato de Clubes Campeones del Interior: 4

1965, 1975, 1976, 2001

- Supercopa de Clubes Campeones del Interior: 3

1971, 1972, 1974

== Current squad ==
As of 19 October 2020

Note: Flags indicate national team as defined under FIFA eligibility rules; some limited exceptions apply. Players may hold more than one non-FIFA nationality.

No.	Pos.	Nation	Player
1	GK	URU	Esteban Conde
3	DF	URU	Emiliano Díaz
4	DF	ARG	Renzo Paparelli (on loan from Talleres)
5	MF	URU	Roberto Brum
6	DF	URU	Juan Figueroa
8	MF	ARG	Sebastián Riquelme
9	FW	URU	Maximiliano San Martín
14	DF	URU	Michel Acosta
16	MF	URU	Fernando Sellanes
19	DF	URU	Valentín Amoroso
21	DF	URU	Gonzalo Maulela
25	GK	URU	Francisco Tinaglini (on loan from Montevideo City)
26	MF	URU	Anderson Bonette (on loan from Rentistas)
29	FW	URU	Fabián Pesca
30	DF	URU	Emanuel Carlos (on loan from Fénix)
31	FW	URU	Franco Acosta
33	DF	URU	Gonzalo Camargo
34	FW	URU	Agustín Araújo
35	FW	URU	Jonathan Ramírez
36	DF	URU	Sebastián Hohl
37	FW	ARG	Facundo Taborda

No.	Pos.	Nation	Player
40	MF	URU	Gonzalo Ramos
—	GK	URU	Jonathan Deniz
—	GK	URU	Lucio Segovia
—	DF	URU	Santiago de Ávila
—	DF	URU	Pablo González
—	DF	URU	Gervásio Olivera
—	DF	URU	Enzo Romero
—	DF	URU	Mathías Silvera (on loan from Cerro)
—	DF	URU	Ángel Villagra
—	MF	URU	Briam Acosta (on loan from Danubio)
—	MF	URU	Emiliano Ghan
—	MF	URU	Isaac Méndez
—	FW	URU	Yhojan Díaz
—	FW	ARG	Francisco Apaolaza (on loan from Estudiantes)
—	FW	URU	Ezequiel Berriel
—	FW	ARG	Lucas Farías
—	FW	URU	Yosemil López
—	FW	ARG	José Méndez
—	FW	URU	Agustín Tejera (on loan from Nacional)
—	FW	URU	Mathías Saavedra

=== Out on loan ===
Note: Flags indicate national team as defined under FIFA eligibility rules; some limited exceptions apply. Players may hold more than one non-FIFA nationality.

No.	Pos.	Nation	Player
—3	GK	IND	Baby Vidyuth (at Rocha until 2 January 2022)
