= Christian (footballer, born 1995) =

Brazilian footballer

Personal information
- Full name: Christian Savio Machado
- Date of birth: 8 December 1995 (age 30)
- Place of birth: São João del Rei, Brazil
- Height: 1.75 m (5 ft 9 in)
- Position: Midfielder

Team information
- Current team: Novo Hamburgo

Youth career
- 2014–2015: América Mineiro

Senior career*
Years	Team	Apps	(Gls)
2016–2020	América Mineiro	46	(2)
2019–2020	→ Figueirense (loan)	1	(0)
2021	Athletic	11	(1)
2022	Paysandu	1	(0)
2022	→ Amazonas (loan)	17	(2)
2023	Pouso Alegre	7	(0)
2023	Athletic	13	(0)
2024–	Novo Hamburgo	5	(0)
- * Club domestic league appearances and goals as of 14:58, 8 March 2024

Christian Savio Machado, commonly known as Christian is a Brazilian footballer who plays as a midfielder for Novo Hamburgo.

== Career ==
=== América Mineiro ===
Christian came through the youth system at América Mineiro, making his debut in 2016 Campeonato Brasileiro Série A on 20 August 2016 as a substitute against Chapecoense. He scored his first goal for the club against Tricordiano on 25 March 2017, scoring in the 22nd minute.

=== Figueirense ===
Christian made his league debut for Figueirense against Oeste on 4 October 2019.

=== First spell at Athletic ===
Christian made his league debut for Athletic against Patrocinense on 28 February 2021. He scored his first goal for the club against Tombense on 4 April 2021, scoring in the 45th+2nd minute.

=== Paysandu ===
Christian made his league debut for Paysandu against Atlético Cearense.

=== Amazonas ===
Christian made his league debut for Amazonas against São Raimundo AM on 15 May 2022. He scored his first goal for the club against Trem on 3 July 2022, scoring in the 46th minute.

=== Pouso Alegre ===
Christian made his league debut for Pouso Alegre against América Mineiro on 22 January 2023.

=== Second spell at Athletic ===
During his second spell at the club, Christian made his league debut for the club against Nova Iguaçu on 6 May 2023.

=== Novo Hamburgo ===
Christian made his league debut for Novo Hamburgo against Ypiranga RS on 31 January 2024.
