= Fernando Arismendi =

Uruguayan footballer (born 1991)

Personal information
- Full name: José Fernando Arismendi Peralta
- Date of birth: 31 March 1991 (age 35)
- Place of birth: Paso de los Toros, Uruguay
- Height: 1.75 m (5 ft 9 in)
- Position: Midfielder

Team information
- Current team: GV San José
- Number: 16

Youth career
- Defensor Sporting

Senior career*
Years	Team	Apps	(Gls)
2011–2015	Defensor Sporting	1	(0)
2013	→ Rampla Juniors (loan)	15	(1)
2013–2014	→ Rocha (loan)	27	(9)
2024–2015	→ Sud América (loan)	35	(10)
2016	Chiapas	0	(0)
2016	→ Cafetaleros (loan)	7	(0)
2016	→ Celaya (loan)	0	(0)
2016–2017	Celaya	1	(0)
2017	→ Cerro (loan)	13	(0)
2018	Delfín	34	(7)
2019	Everton	17	(0)
2020	Blooming	19	(6)
2021	Albion	20	(4)
2022–2024	Blooming	85	(12)
2025–	GV San José	29	(8)
- * Club domestic league appearances and goals as of 30 December 2025

José Fernando Arismendi Peralta (born March 31, 1991), known as Fernando Arismendi, is a professional Uruguayan footballer who currently plays for Bolivian club GV San José.

== Teams ==
- (Uruguay) Defensor Sporting 2011–2012
- (Uruguay) Rampla Juniors 2013
- (Uruguay) Rocha 2013–2014
- (Uruguay) Sud América 2014–2015
- (Mexico) Cafetaleros de Tapachula 2016
- (Mexico) Celaya 2016
- (Uruguay) Cerro 2017
- (Ecuador) Delfín 2018
- (Chile) Everton 2019
- (Bolivia) Blooming 2020
- (Uruguay) Albion 2021
- (Bolivia) Blooming 2022–2024
- (Bolivia) GV San José 2025-present
