= Rafinha (footballer, born 1983) =

Brazilian footballer

Personal information
- Full name: Rafael da Silva Francisco
- Date of birth: 4 August 1983 (age 43)
- Place of birth: Guarulhos, Brazil
- Height: 1.67 m (5 ft 5 1/2 in)
- Position: Attacking midfielder

Youth career
- 2000–2001: Portuguesa

Senior career*
Years	Team	Apps	(Gls)
2002–2003	Portuguesa	1	(0)
2003–2010	São Paulo	3	(0)
2004–2006	→ Santo André (loan)	51	(11)
2006	→ Grêmio (loan)	22	(2)
2007–2008	→ São Caetano (loan)	53	(4)
2009	→ Goiás (loan)	16	(4)
2009	→ Paraná (loan)	20	(6)
2010	→ Coritiba (loan)	50	(17)
2011–2013	Coritiba	105	(22)
2013–2016	Al-Shabab	66	(15)
2016–2019	Cruzeiro	99	(13)
2019–2021	Coritiba	86	(7)
Total		572	(101)
- * Club domestic league appearances and goals

Rafael da Silva Francisco (born 4 August 1983 in Guarulhos), commonly known as Rafinha , is a Brazilian footballer who plays as an attacking midfielder.

== Style of play ==
Rafinha is known for his acceleration, speed, dribbling, finishing and ability with both feet. He primarily plays as either a central striker, winger or occasionally as an attacking midfielder

== Career statistics ==
=== Club ===
Appearances and goals by club, season and competition
Club	Season	League			State league		National cup		League cup		Continental		Other		Total	
Club	Season	Division	Apps	Goals	Apps	Goals	Apps	Goals	Apps	Goals	Apps	Goals	Apps	Goals	Apps	Goals
Portuguesa	2002	Série A	1	0	—		—		—		—		—		1	0
Portuguesa	2003	Série B	—		2	0	—		—		—		—		2	0
Portuguesa	Total		1	0	2	0	—		—		—		—		3	0
São Paulo	2004	Série A	—		1	0	—		—		—		—		1	0
Santo André (loan)	2004	Série B	4	1	—		—		—		—		—		4	1
Santo André (loan)	2005	Série B	22	6	13	1	0	0	—		5	1	—		40	8
Santo André (loan)	2006	Série B	1	0	11	3	2	0	—		—		—		14	3
Santo André (loan)	Total		27	7	24	4	2	0	—		5	1	—		58	12
Grêmio (loan)	2006	Série A	22	2	—		—		—		—		—		22	2
São Caetano (loan)	2007	Série B	14	1	—		—		—		—		—		14	1
São Caetano (loan)	2008	Série B	24	2	15	1	6	1	—		—		—		45	4
São Caetano (loan)	Total		38	3	15	1	6	1	—		—		—		59	5
Goiás (loan)	2009	Série A	3	0	13	4	2	0	—		1	0	—		19	4
Paraná (loan)	2009	Série B	20	6	—		—		—		—		—		20	6
Coritiba (loan)	2010	Série A	34	10	16	7	4	1	—		—		—		54	18
Coritiba	2011	Série A	28	4	17	3	12	2	—		—		—		57	9
Coritiba	2012	Série A	23	4	17	4	5	0	—		1	0	—		46	8
Coritiba	2013	Série A	2	0	18	7	1	0	—		—		—		21	7
Coritiba	Total		87	18	68	21	22	3	—		1	0	—		178	42
Al-Shabab	2013–14	Saudi Pro League	23	6	—		5	1	2	1	9	2	—		39	10
Al-Shabab	2014–15	Saudi Pro League	21	5	—		1	0	1	0	5	0	1	0	29	5
Al-Shabab	2015–16	Saudi Pro League	22	4	—		2	0	3	0	—		—		27	4
Al-Shabab	Total		66	15	—		8	1	6	1	14	2	1	0	95	19
Cruzeiro	2016	Série A	16	2	—		5	0	—		—		—		21	2
Cruzeiro	2017	Série A	28	3	13	0	8	0	—		2	0	4	0	55	3
Cruzeiro	2018	Série A	19	0	13	5	8	0	—		9	1	—		49	6
Cruzeiro	2019	Série A	1	0	9	3	—		—		6	0	—		16	3
Cruzeiro	Total		64	5	35	8	21	0	—		17	1	4	0	141	14
Coritiba	2019	Série B	22	2	—		—		—		—		—		22	2
Coritiba	2020	Série A	9	0	14	4	1	0	—		—		—		24	4
Coritiba	2021	Série B	33	0	8	1	4	0	—		—		—		45	1
Coritiba	Total		64	2	22	5	5	0	—		—		—		91	7
Career total			392	58	180	43	66	5	6	1	38	4	5	0	687	111

== Honours ==
Portuguesa

- Copa São Paulo de Futebol Jr.: 2002

São Paulo

- Campeonato Brasileiro: 2007

Goiás

- Campeonato Goiano: 2009

Coritiba

- Campeonato Paranaense: 2010, 2011, 2012, 2013
- Campeonato Brasileiro Série B: 2010

Al-Shabab

- Kings Cup: 2014
- Saudi Super Cup: 2014

Cruzeiro

- Copa do Brasil: 2017, 2018
- Campeonato Mineiro: 2018, 2019
