= Leandro Díaz (footballer, born 1992) =

Argentine footballer

Personal information
- Full name: Leandro Nicolás Díaz
- Date of birth: June 6, 1992 (age 34)
- Place of birth: San Miguel de Tucumán, Argentina
- Height: 1.82 m (6 ft 0 in)
- Position: Forward

Team information
- Current team: Tucumán
- Number: 9

Youth career
- Lanús

Senior career*
Years	Team	Apps	(Gls)
2010–2014	Lanús	45	(4)
2012	→ Tigre (loan)	10	(1)
2013–2014	→ Huracán (loan)	7	(0)
2014	Everton	4	(0)
2014–2015	Tucumán	27	(9)
2016	Ferro Carril Oeste	13	(5)
2016–2017	Sarmiento	10	(4)
2017	Rafaela	14	(3)
2017–2018	Veracruz	11	(0)
2018–2022	Tucumán	46	(11)
2020–2021	→ Estudiantes (loan)	44	(14)
2022–2023	Estudiantes	34	(12)
2023–2025	Lanús	50	(17)
2025–	Tucumán	50	(13)
- * Club domestic league appearances and goals as of 17:32, 9 November 2026 (UTC)

Leandro Nicolás Díaz (born 6 June 1992) is an Argentine football forward. He currently plays for Atlético Tucumán.

== Honours ==
Atlético Tucumán

- Primera B Nacional (1): 2015
