= 2019–20 Racing Club de Avellaneda season =

Racing Club
2019–20 season
- President: Víctor Blanco
- Manager: Eduardo Coudet
- Stadium: Estadio Presidente Juan Domingo Perón
- Copa Argentina: Round of 64
- Top goalscorer: League: Nery Domínguez (1); Iván Pillud; Augusto Solari; Darío Cvitanich; Lisandro López; Diego González; All: Nery Domínguez (1); Iván Pillud; Augusto Solari; Darío Cvitanich; Lisandro López; Diego González

The 2019–20 season is Racing Club's 35th consecutive season in the top division of Argentine football. In addition to the Primera División, the club are competing in the Copa Argentina, Copa de la Superliga and Copa Libertadores.

The season generally covers the period from 1 July 2019 to 30 June 2020.

== Review ==
=== Pre-season ===
Ricardo Centurión and Guillermo Fernández left for Mexican football on 14 June, having agreed terms with Atlético San Luis and Cruz Azul on 30 May and 13 June respectively; the former being a loan deal. On 8 June, Renzo Saravia was purchased by Primeira Liga side Porto. Three days later, Racing Club announced their first signing as Matías Rojas transferred from Cerro Porteño. Gonzalo Piovi departed on 24 June, penning a contract with Defensa y Justicia. Hours after, following his contract expiring, youngster Patricio Boolsen was signed by Santamarina. A swap with Atlético Tucumán was revealed on 27 June, as David Barbona switched spots with Augusto Lotti and Yonathan Cabral; the latter making his loan move permanent. Racing also paid $750k.

Barracas Central snapped up two Racing youngsters on loan on 28 June, with Gonzalo Córdoba and Alexis Cuello heading to Buenos Aires. Numerous loans from the previous campaign officially expired on and around 30 June. A fresh loan was confirmed on 1 July, as Santiago Rosales penned a season-long deal with Patronato. A fifth temporary outgoing was communicated a day later, with newly-promoted top-flight team Central Córdoba loaning Marcelo Meli. A scheduled friendly with Arsenal de Sarandí was cancelled on 2 July. 3 July saw Martín Pérez Guedes make a move to Indian football with Delhi Dynamos. Ricardo Noir and Juan Gabriel Patiño completed loans to Belgrano and Cerro Porteño on 4 July. Lautaro Arregui went to Santamarina on 5 July.

Martín Ojeda and Mariano Bareiro were loaned to fellow Primera División outfit Huracán on 5 July. Racing played friendlies with Chivas Florida whilst on their training camp of Orlando, United States and came away with a 5–0 aggregate win. A third youngster made the move to Santamarina on 7 July, as central midfielder Gustavo Iturra headed to Tandil. Atlanta concluded the loan signing of Héctor Villalba on 10 July. A second opponent of pre-season was met on 10 July, as they put five total goals past Florida Soccer Soldiers of the United Premier Soccer League. Walter Montoya was loaned in from Cruz Azul on 11 July. Racing ended their US tour with victories over Miami Sun and Naples United on 13 July. Sergio Vittor went out on loan to Banfield on 17 July.

=== July ===
Racing Club suffered a shock exit in the Copa Argentina on 21 July, as they were eliminated by Torneo Federal A's Boca Unidos at the round of sixty-four via a penalty shoot-out. Racing drew their Primera División opener on 26 July, as Unión Santa Fe held them to a scoreless draw on home soil. José Luis Rodríguez signed an eighteen-month loan contract with Racing from Danubio on 30 July.

=== August ===
Neri Cardozo departed Racing on 1 August, as he agreed a contract with Defensa y Justicia. Facundo Castillón also left, with him going to Greece with Levadiakos. Racing produced a second half comeback from two goals down to secure a point away to Vélez Sarsfield on 3 August. Braian Mansilla went off to Portuguese football on loan with Vitória Setúbal on 6 August. Evelio Cardozo scored as Racing beat Arsenal de Sarandí on 9 August, in an exhibition match that followed a goalless draw between the two earlier in the day. Eduardo Coudet got his fifth reinforcement on 13 August, as forward Nicolás Reniero came from San Lorenzo. Cristian Marcial was loaned by Platense on 15 August. Racing conceded six goals in a home loss to River Plate on 17 August.

Racing dropped further points on 25 August, as they drew 0–0 with newly-promoted Central Córdoba. Racing returned to winning ways on 31 August with a 3–1 victory over Godoy Cruz.

== Squad ==
| Squad No. | Nationality | Name | Position(s) | Date of Birth (age) | Signed from |
Goalkeepers
| 1 | Chile | Gabriel Arias | GK | 13 September 1987 (age 39) | Defensa y Justicia |
| 13 | Argentina | Javier García | GK | 29 January 1987 (age 39) | Tigre |
| 25 | Argentina | Gastón Gómez | GK | 4 March 1996 (age 30) | Academy |
| | Argentina | Federico Escobar | GK | 1 January 2000 (age 26) | Academy |
| | Venezuela | Carlos Olses | GK | 21 September 2000 (age 26) | Deportivo La Guaira (loan) |
| | Argentina | Nicolás Stella | GK | 26 March 1997 (age 29) | Academy |
Defenders
| 2 | Argentina | Alejandro Donatti | CB | 24 October 1986 (age 40) | Tijuana |
| 3 | Argentina | Alexis Soto | LB | 20 October 1993 (age 33) | Banfield |
| 4 | Argentina | Iván Pillud | RB | 24 April 1986 (age 40) | Tiro Federal |
| 5 | Chile | Eugenio Mena | LB | 18 July 1988 (age 38) | Bahia |
| 6 | Argentina | Lucas Orbán | LB | 3 February 1989 (age 37) | Genoa |
| 14 | Argentina | Rodrigo Schlegel | CB | 3 April 1997 (age 29) | Academy |
| 30 | Argentina | Leonardo Sigali | CB | 29 May 1987 (age 39) | Dinamo Zagreb |
| | Uruguay | José Luis Rodríguez | DF | 14 March 1997 (age 29) | Danubio (loan) |
Midfielders
| 8 | Argentina | Diego González | DM | 9 February 1988 (age 38) | Santos Laguna |
| 10 | Paraguay | Matías Rojas | AM | 3 November 1995 (age 31) | Cerro Porteño |
| 11 | Argentina | David Barbona | AM | 22 January 1995 (age 31) | Atlético Tucumán |
| 16 | Argentina | Mauricio Martínez | DM | 20 February 1993 (age 33) | Rosario Central |
| 18 | Argentina | Augusto Solari | RM | 3 February 1992 (age 34) | River Plate |
| 21 | Chile | Marcelo Díaz | DM | 30 December 1986 (age 39) | UNAM |
| 22 | Argentina | Juan Manuel Sánchez de León | DM | 7 July 1999 (age 27) | Academy |
| 23 | Argentina | Nery Domínguez | DM | 9 April 1990 (age 36) | Querétaro |
| 24 | Argentina | Julián López | CM | 8 January 2000 (age 26) | Academy |
| 28 | Argentina | Federico Zaracho | RM | 10 March 1998 (age 28) | Academy |
| 32 | Argentina | Walter Montoya | AM | 21 July 1993 (age 33) | Cruz Azul (loan) |
| | Argentina | Nicolás Muscio | AM | 18 February 1998 (age 28) | Academy |
Forwards
| 7 | Colombia | Mateo Cassierra | CF | 13 April 1997 (age 29) | Ajax (loan) |
| 9 | Argentina | Jonatan Cristaldo | CF | 5 March 1989 (age 37) | Vélez Sarsfield |
| 11 | Argentina | Andrés Ríos | CF | 1 August 1989 (age 37) | Vasco da Gama |
| 15 | Argentina | Lisandro López | CF | 2 March 1983 (age 43) | Internacional |
| 20 | Argentina | Darío Cvitanich | CF | 16 May 1984 (age 42) | Banfield |
| 27 | Argentina | Evelio Cardozo | FW | 6 February 2001 (age 25) | Academy |
| 29 | Argentina | Nicolás Reniero | CF | 18 March 1995 (age 31) | San Lorenzo |
| | Argentina | Braian Guille | FW | 31 July 1997 (age 29) | Academy |
| Out on loan | | | | | Loaned to |
| 17 | Argentina | Martín Ojeda | LW | 27 November 1998 (age 27) | Huracán |
| | Argentina | Nelson Acevedo | LM | 11 July 1988 (age 38) | Unión Santa Fe |
| | Argentina | Braian Álvarez | LM | 22 August 1997 (age 29) | Unión Santa Fe |
| | Uruguay | Rodrigo Amaral | AM | 25 March 1997 (age 29) | Nacional |
| | Argentina | Mariano Bareiro | DM | 8 March 1995 (age 31) | Huracán |
| | Argentina | Ricardo Centurión | LW | 19 January 1993 (age 33) | Atlético San Luis |
| | Argentina | Gonzalo Córdoba | MF | 29 March 2000 (age 26) | Barracas Central |
| | Argentina | Pablo Cuadra | CF | 6 June 1995 (age 31) | Unión Santa Fe |
| | Argentina | Alexis Cuello | FW | 18 February 2000 (age 26) | Barracas Central |
| | Argentina | Juan Ignacio Dinenno | FW | 28 August 1994 (age 32) | Deportivo Cali |
| | Argentina | Facundo Gutiérrez | CM | 3 June 1997 (age 29) | Godoy Cruz |
| | Argentina | Gustavo Iturra | CM | 6 April 1999 (age 27) | Santamarina |
| | Argentina | Cristian Marcial | DF | 10 January 1996 (age 30) | Platense |
| | Argentina | Braian Mansilla | CF | 16 April 1997 (age 29) | Vitória Setúbal |
| | Argentina | Marcelo Meli | AM | 20 June 1992 (age 34) | Central Córdoba |
| | Argentina | Ricardo Noir | LW | 26 February 1987 (age 39) | Belgrano |
| | Argentina | Nicolás Oroz | AM | 1 April 1994 (age 32) | Universidad de Chile |
| | Paraguay | Juan Gabriel Patiño | CB | 29 November 1989 (age 36) | Cerro Porteño |
| | Argentina | Leonel Piedrabuena | GK | 26 July 1999 (age 27) | Ocampo Fábrica |
| | Argentina | Santiago Rosales | AM | 22 March 1995 (age 31) | Patronato |
| | Paraguay | Héctor Villalba | CB | 29 November 1989 (age 36) | Atlanta |
| | Argentina | Sergio Vittor | CB | 9 June 1989 (age 37) | Banfield |

== Transfers ==
Domestic transfer windows:
3 July 2019 to 24 September 2019
20 January 2020 to 19 February 2020.

=== Transfers in ===
| Date from | Position | Nationality | Name | From | Ref. |
|---|---|---|---|---|---|
| 3 July 2019 (Note: Deal agreed on 11 June 2019) | AM | Paraguay | Matías Rojas | Cerro Porteño | |
| 3 July 2019 (Note: Deal agreed on 27 June 2019) | AM | Argentina | David Barbona | Atlético Tucumán | |
| 13 August 2019 | CF | Argentina | Nicolás Reniero | San Lorenzo | |

=== Transfers out ===
| Date from | Position | Nationality | Name | To | Ref. |
|---|---|---|---|---|---|
| 14 June 2019 (Note: Deal agreed on 13 June 2019) | RM | Argentina | Guillermo Fernández | Cruz Azul | |
| 1 July 2019 (Note: Deal agreed on 8 June 2019) | RB | Argentina | Renzo Saravia | Porto | |
| 2 July 2019 | LM | Argentina | Martín Pérez Guedes | Delhi Dynamos | |
| 3 July 2019 (Note: Deal agreed on 24 June 2019) | LB | Argentina | Gonzalo Piovi | Defensa y Justicia | |
| 3 July 2019 (Note: Deal agreed on 24 June 2019) | DF | Argentina | Patricio Boolsen | Santamarina | |
| 3 July 2019 (Note: Deal agreed on 27 June 2019) | CF | Argentina | Augusto Lotti | Atlético Tucumán | |
| 3 July 2019 (Note: Deal agreed on 27 June 2019) | CB | Argentina | Yonathan Cabral | Atlético Tucumán | |
| 5 July 2019 | MF | Argentina | Lautaro Arregui | Santamarina | |
| 1 August 2019 | LM | Argentina | Neri Cardozo | Defensa y Justicia | |
| 1 August 2019 | RW | Argentina | Facundo Castillón | Levadiakos | |

=== Loans in ===
| Start date | Position | Nationality | Name | From | End date | Ref. |
|---|---|---|---|---|---|---|
| 11 July 2019 | AM | Argentina | Walter Montoya | Cruz Azul | 31 December 2020 | |
| 30 July 2019 | DF | Uruguay | José Luis Rodríguez | Danubio | 31 December 2020 | |

=== Loans out ===
| Start date | Position | Nationality | Name | To | End date | Ref. |
|---|---|---|---|---|---|---|
| 14 June 2019 (Note: Deal agreed on 30 May 2019) | LW | Argentina | Ricardo Centurión | Atlético San Luis | 31 December 2019 | |
| 3 July 2019 (Note: Deal agreed on 28 June 2019) | MF | Argentina | Gonzalo Córdoba | Barracas Central | 30 June 2020 | |
| 3 July 2019 (Note: Deal agreed on 28 June 2019) | FW | Argentina | Alexis Cuello | Barracas Central | 30 June 2020 | |
| 3 July 2019 (Note: Deal agreed on 1 July 2019) | AM | Argentina | Santiago Rosales | Patronato | 30 June 2020 | |
| 3 July 2019 (Note: Deal agreed on 2 July 2019) | AM | Argentina | Marcelo Meli | Central Córdoba | 30 June 2020 | |
| 4 July 2019 | LW | Argentina | Ricardo Noir | Belgrano | 30 June 2020 | |
| 5 July 2019 | LW | Argentina | Mariano Bareiro | Huracán | 30 June 2020 | |
| 5 July 2019 | LW | Argentina | Martín Ojeda | Huracán | 30 June 2020 | |
| 7 July 2019 | CM | Argentina | Gustavo Iturra | Santamarina | 30 June 2020 | |
| 8 July 2019 (Note: Deal agreed on 4 July 2019) | CB | Paraguay | Juan Gabriel Patiño | Cerro Porteño | 30 June 2020 | |
| 10 July 2019 | CB | Argentina | Héctor Villalba | Atlanta | 30 June 2020 | |
| 17 July 2019 | CB | Argentina | Sergio Vittor | Banfield | 30 June 2020 | |
| 6 August 2019 | CF | Argentina | Braian Mansilla | Vitória Setúbal | 30 June 2020 | |
| 15 August 2019 | DF | Argentina | Cristian Marcial | Platense | 30 June 2020 | |

== Friendlies ==
=== Pre-season ===
An exhibition match between Racing Club and Arsenal de Sarandí, set for 13 July, was revealed on 11 June 2019; though was later cancelled. Whilst training in Orlando, Florida, Racing met local sides Chivas Florida, Florida Soccer Soldiers, Miami Sun and Naples United in friendlies.

Win Draw Loss

| 4 July 2019 Friendly | Chivas Florida | 0–1 | Racing Club | Orlando, United States |
| | | Racing Club; TyC Sports; 35 min. match | M. Zaracho |

| 4 July 2019 Friendly | Chivas Florida | 0–4 | Racing Club | Orlando, United States |
| | | Racing Club; TyC Sports | D. Cvitanich; D. González; N. Cardozo; M. Cassierra | Stadium: ChampionsGate Sports Complex |

| 10 July 2019 Friendly | Florida Soccer Soldiers | 0–3 | Racing Club | Orlando, United States |
| | | Racing Club; Olé; 50 min. match | J. Cristaldo; D. Barbona | Stadium: ChampionsGate Sports Complex |

| 10 July 2019 Friendly | Florida Soccer Soldiers | 0–2 | Racing Club | Orlando, United States |
| | | Racing Club; Olé; 50 min. match | D. Cvitanich; M. Cassierra | Stadium: ChampionsGate Sports Complex |

| 13 July 2019 Friendly | Miami Sun | 1–3 | Racing Club | Orlando, United States |
| | Goal | Racing Club; AS; 60 min. match | W. Montoya; E. Cardozo; D. Barbona | Stadium: ChampionsGate Sports Complex |

| 13 July 2019 Friendly | Naples United | 0–2 | Racing Club | Orlando, United States |
| | | Racing Club; AS; 60 min. match | A. Solari; M. Zaracho | Stadium: ChampionsGate Sports Complex |

| 13 July 2019 Friendly | Arsenal de Sarandí | Cancelled | Racing Club | Argentina |
| | | Arsenal de Sarandí |

=== Mid-season ===
Racing would meet Arsenal de Sarandí in a mid-season friendly on 9 August in Sarandí at Racing's Predio Tita Mattiussi training complex.

Win Draw Loss

| 9 August 2019 Friendly | Racing Club | 0–0 | Arsenal de Sarandí | Sarandí, Argentina |
| 10:30 GMT-3 | | Racing Club; El Intransigente; 45 min. match | | Stadium: Predio Tita Mattiussi; Attendance: 0 (Note: Behind closed doors.) |

| 9 August 2019 Friendly | Racing Club | 1–0 | Arsenal de Sarandí | Sarandí, Argentina |
| | E. Cardozo | Racing Club; El Intransigente; 45 min. match | | Stadium: Predio Tita Mattiussi; Attendance: 0 (Note: Behind closed doors.) |

== Competitions ==
=== Primera División ===
==== League table ====
| Pos | Team | Pld | W | D | L | GF | GA | GD | Pts |
|---|---|---|---|---|---|---|---|---|---|
| 2 | River Plate | 23 | 14 | 5 | 4 | 41 | 18 | +23 | 47 |
| 3 | Vélez Sarsfield | 23 | 11 | 6 | 6 | 27 | 14 | +13 | 39 |
| 4 | Racing | 23 | 9 | 12 | 2 | 28 | 23 | +5 | 39 |
| 5 | Argentinos Juniors | 23 | 10 | 9 | 4 | 22 | 17 | +5 | 39 |
| 6 | Defensa y Justicia | 23 | 10 | 6 | 7 | 26 | 18 | +8 | 36 |

Source: AFA
Rules for classification: 1) points; 2) play-off (only if needed to decide championship); 3) goal difference; 4) goals scored; 5) head-to-head points; 6) head-to-head goal difference; 7) head-to-head goals scored.

==== Relegation table ====
| Pos | Team | 2017–18 Pts | 2018–19 Pts | 2019–20 Pts | Total Pts | Total Pld | Avg | Relegation |
|---|---|---|---|---|---|---|---|---|
| 1 | Boca Juniors | 58 | 51 | 11 | 120 | 57 | 2.105 | |
| 2 | Racing | 45 | 57 | 6 | 108 | 57 | 1.895 | |
| 3 | Arsenal | 0 | 0 | 9 | 9 | 5 | 1.8 | |
| 4 | Defensa y Justicia | 44 | 53 | 4 | 101 | 57 | 1.772 | |
| 5 | River Plate | 45 | 45 | 8 | 98 | 57 | 1.719 | |

Source: AFA

==== Results summary ====
| Overall | | | | | | | | Home | | | | | | Away | | | | | |
| Pld | W | D | L | GF | GA | GD | Pts | W | D | L | GF | GA | GD | W | D | L | GF | GA | GD |
|---|---|---|---|---|---|---|---|---|---|---|---|---|---|---|---|---|---|---|---|
| 5 | 1 | 3 | 1 | 6 | 9 | −3 | 6 | 1 | 1 | 1 | 4 | 7 | −3 | 0 | 2 | 0 | 2 | 2 | 0 |

Last updated: 1 September 2019.
Source: Soccerway

==== Matches ====
The fixtures for the 2019–20 campaign were released on 10 July.

Win Draw Loss

| 26 July 2019 1 | Racing Club | 0–0 | Unión Santa Fe | Avellaneda, Argentina |
| 21:00 GMT-3 | | Racing Club; Infobae; Soccerway | | Stadium: Estadio Presidente Juan Domingo Perón; Referee: Nicolás Lamolina (Argentina) |

| 3 August 2019 2 | Vélez Sarsfield | 2–2 | Racing Club | Buenos Aires, Argentina |
| 20:00 GMT-3 | Ni. Domínguez 34'; M. Romero 42' | Vélez Sarsfield; Infobae; Soccerway | Ne. Domínguez 57'; I. Pillud 88' | Stadium: José Amalfitani Stadium; Referee: Néstor Pitana (Argentina) |

| 17 August 2019 3 | Racing Club | 1–6 | River Plate | Avellaneda, Argentina |
| 20:00 GMT-3 | A. Solari 3' | Racing Club; Infobae; Soccerway | R. Borré 35', 36'; M. Suárez 38'; I. Fernández 64' (pen.); N. De La Cruz 68'; I. Scocco 71' | Stadium: Estadio Presidente Juan Domingo Perón; Referee: Patricio Loustau (Argentina) |

| 25 August 2019 4 | Central Córdoba | 0–0 | Racing Club | Santiago del Estero, Argentina |
| 15:30 GMT-3 | | Racing Club; Infobae; Soccerway | | Stadium: Estadio Alfredo Terrera; Referee: Mauro Vigliano (Argentina) |

| 31 August 2019 5 | Racing Club | 3–1 | Godoy Cruz | Avellaneda, Argentina |
| 20:00 GMT-3 | D. Cvitanich 32'; L. López 43'; D. González 45+2' | Racing Club; Infobae; Soccerway | S. García 38' | Stadium: Estadio Presidente Juan Domingo Perón; Referee: Germán Delfino (Argentina) |

| 6 | Gimnasia y Esgrima | – | Racing Club | La Plata, Argentina |
| | | | | Stadium: Estadio Juan Carmelo Zerillo |

=== Copa Argentina ===
Boca Unidos, of Torneo Federal A, were drawn to be Racing Club's round of sixty-four opponents in the Copa Argentina, with the tie scheduled to be played at the Estadio Ciudad de Lanús – Néstor Díaz Pérez on 21 July 2019; a neutral venue, as is customary in the competition.

Win Draw Loss

| 21 July 2019 R64 | Racing Club | 0–0 (3–4 p) | Boca Unidos | Lanús, Argentina |
| 17:10 GMT-3 | | Infobae; Soccerway | | Stadium: Estadio Ciudad de Lanús – Néstor Díaz Pérez; Referee: Hernán Mastrángelo (Argentina) |
| | Penalties |
| | L. López (penalty scored); M. Rojas (penalty scored); D. Barbona (penalty missed); I. Pillud (penalty scored); D. Cvitanich (penalty missed); M. Díaz (penalty missed) | | L. Baroni (penalty scored); M. Ojeda (penalty scored); M. Fabro (penalty missed); A. Morales (penalty scored); J. Vizcarra (penalty missed); F. Alloco (penalty scored) |

=== Copa de la Superliga ===
Win Draw Loss

| | – |
| 00:00 GMT-3 |

=== Copa Libertadores ===
Win Draw Loss

| | – |
| 00:00 GMT-3 |

== Squad statistics ==
=== Appearances and goals ===
| No. | Pos. | Nationality | Name | League | | Cup | | League Cup | | Continental | | Total | | Discipline | | Ref |
| No. | Pos. | Nationality | Name | Apps | Goals | Apps | Goals | Apps | Goals | Apps | Goals | Apps | Goals | Yellow card | Red card | Ref |
|---|---|---|---|---|---|---|---|---|---|---|---|---|---|---|---|---|
| 1 | GK | Chile | Gabriel Arias | 5 | 0 | 1 | 0 | 0 | 0 | 0 | 0 | 6 | 0 | 0 | 0 | |
| 2 | CB | Argentina | Alejandro Donatti | 1 | 0 | 1 | 0 | 0 | 0 | 0 | 0 | 2 | 0 | 1 | 0 | |
| 3 | LB | Argentina | Alexis Soto | 3 | 0 | 1 | 0 | 0 | 0 | 0 | 0 | 4 | 0 | 1 | 0 | |
| 4 | RB | Argentina | Iván Pillud | 5 | 1 | 1 | 0 | 0 | 0 | 0 | 0 | 6 | 1 | 1 | 0 | |
| 5 | LB | Chile | Eugenio Mena | 2 | 0 | 0 | 0 | 0 | 0 | 0 | 0 | 2 | 0 | 0 | 0 | |
| 6 | LB | Argentina | Lucas Orbán | 2 | 0 | 0 | 0 | 0 | 0 | 0 | 0 | 2 | 0 | 2 | 0 | |
| 7 | CF | Colombia | Mateo Cassierra | 0 | 0 | 0 | 0 | 0 | 0 | 0 | 0 | 0 | 0 | 0 | 0 | |
| 8 | DM | Argentina | Diego González | 1(3) | 1 | 1 | 0 | 0 | 0 | 0 | 0 | 2(3) | 1 | 0 | 0 | |
| 9 | CF | Argentina | Jonatan Cristaldo | 2(1) | 0 | 0 | 0 | 0 | 0 | 0 | 0 | 2(1) | 0 | 1 | 1 | |
| 10 | AM | Paraguay | Matías Rojas | 3(2) | 0 | 0(1) | 0 | 0 | 0 | 0 | 0 | 3(3) | 0 | 0 | 0 | |
| 11 | AM | Argentina | David Barbona | 1(1) | 0 | 0(1) | 0 | 0 | 0 | 0 | 0 | 1(2) | 0 | 1 | 0 | |
| 13 | GK | Argentina | Javier García | 0 | 0 | 0 | 0 | 0 | 0 | 0 | 0 | 0 | 0 | 0 | 0 | |
| 14 | CB | Argentina | Rodrigo Schlegel | 0 | 0 | 0 | 0 | 0 | 0 | 0 | 0 | 0 | 0 | 0 | 0 | |
| 15 | CF | Argentina | Lisandro López | 5 | 1 | 1 | 0 | 0 | 0 | 0 | 0 | 6 | 1 | 2 | 0 | |
| 16 | DM | Argentina | Mauricio Martínez | 0 | 0 | 0 | 0 | 0 | 0 | 0 | 0 | 0 | 0 | 0 | 0 | |
| 17 | LW | Argentina | Martín Ojeda | 0 | 0 | 0 | 0 | 0 | 0 | 0 | 0 | 0 | 0 | 0 | 0 | |
| 18 | RM | Argentina | Augusto Solari | 4 | 1 | 1 | 0 | 0 | 0 | 0 | 0 | 5 | 1 | 1 | 0 | |
| 20 | CF | Argentina | Darío Cvitanich | 1(3) | 1 | 1 | 0 | 0 | 0 | 0 | 0 | 2(3) | 1 | 0 | 0 | |
| 21 | DM | Chile | Marcelo Díaz | 4(1) | 0 | 1 | 0 | 0 | 0 | 0 | 0 | 5(1) | 0 | 0 | 0 | |
| 22 | DM | Argentina | Juan Manuel Sánchez de León | 0 | 0 | 0 | 0 | 0 | 0 | 0 | 0 | 0 | 0 | 0 | 0 | |
| 23 | DM | Argentina | Nery Domínguez | 4(1) | 1 | 0(1) | 0 | 0 | 0 | 0 | 0 | 4(2) | 1 | 3 | 0 | |
| 24 | CM | Argentina | Julián López | 0 | 0 | 0 | 0 | 0 | 0 | 0 | 0 | 0 | 0 | 0 | 0 | |
| 25 | GK | Argentina | Gastón Gómez | 0 | 0 | 0 | 0 | 0 | 0 | 0 | 0 | 0 | 0 | 0 | 0 | |
| 27 | FW | Argentina | Evelio Cardozo | 0 | 0 | 0 | 0 | 0 | 0 | 0 | 0 | 0 | 0 | 0 | 0 | |
| 28 | RM | Argentina | Federico Zaracho | 4 | 0 | 1 | 0 | 0 | 0 | 0 | 0 | 5 | 0 | 2 | 1 | |
| 29 | CF | Argentina | Nicolás Reniero | 2 | 0 | 0 | 0 | 0 | 0 | 0 | 0 | 2 | 0 | 0 | 0 | |
| 30 | CB | Argentina | Leonardo Sigali | 4 | 0 | 1 | 0 | 0 | 0 | 0 | 0 | 5 | 0 | 1 | 1 | |
| 32 | AM | Argentina | Walter Montoya | 2(3) | 0 | 0 | 0 | 0 | 0 | 0 | 0 | 2(3) | 0 | 0 | 0 | |
| – | LM | Argentina | Nelson Acevedo | 0 | 0 | 0 | 0 | 0 | 0 | 0 | 0 | 0 | 0 | 0 | 0 | |
| – | LM | Argentina | Braian Álvarez | 0 | 0 | 0 | 0 | 0 | 0 | 0 | 0 | 0 | 0 | 0 | 0 | |
| – | AM | Uruguay | Rodrigo Amaral | 0 | 0 | 0 | 0 | 0 | 0 | 0 | 0 | 0 | 0 | 0 | 0 | |
| – | DM | Argentina | Mariano Bareiro | 0 | 0 | 0 | 0 | 0 | 0 | 0 | 0 | 0 | 0 | 0 | 0 | |
| – | LW | Argentina | Ricardo Centurión | 0 | 0 | 0 | 0 | 0 | 0 | 0 | 0 | 0 | 0 | 0 | 0 | |
| – | MF | Argentina | Gonzalo Córdoba | 0 | 0 | 0 | 0 | 0 | 0 | 0 | 0 | 0 | 0 | 0 | 0 | |
| – | CF | Argentina | Pablo Cuadra | 0 | 0 | 0 | 0 | 0 | 0 | 0 | 0 | 0 | 0 | 0 | 0 | |
| – | FW | Argentina | Alexis Cuello | 0 | 0 | 0 | 0 | 0 | 0 | 0 | 0 | 0 | 0 | 0 | 0 | |
| – | FW | Argentina | Juan Ignacio Dinenno | 0 | 0 | 0 | 0 | 0 | 0 | 0 | 0 | 0 | 0 | 0 | 0 | |
| – | GK | Argentina | Federico Escobar | 0 | 0 | 0 | 0 | 0 | 0 | 0 | 0 | 0 | 0 | 0 | 0 | |
| – | FW | Argentina | Braian Guille | 0 | 0 | 0 | 0 | 0 | 0 | 0 | 0 | 0 | 0 | 0 | 0 | |
| – | CM | Argentina | Facundo Gutiérrez | 0 | 0 | 0 | 0 | 0 | 0 | 0 | 0 | 0 | 0 | 0 | 0 | |
| – | CM | Argentina | Gustavo Iturra | 0 | 0 | 0 | 0 | 0 | 0 | 0 | 0 | 0 | 0 | 0 | 0 | |
| – | CF | Argentina | Braian Mansilla | 0 | 0 | 0 | 0 | 0 | 0 | 0 | 0 | 0 | 0 | 0 | 0 | |
| – | DF | Argentina | Cristian Marcial | 0 | 0 | 0 | 0 | 0 | 0 | 0 | 0 | 0 | 0 | 0 | 0 | |
| – | AM | Argentina | Marcelo Meli | 0 | 0 | 0 | 0 | 0 | 0 | 0 | 0 | 0 | 0 | 0 | 0 | |
| – | AM | Argentina | Nicolás Muscio | 0 | 0 | 0 | 0 | 0 | 0 | 0 | 0 | 0 | 0 | 0 | 0 | |
| – | LW | Argentina | Ricardo Noir | 0 | 0 | 0 | 0 | 0 | 0 | 0 | 0 | 0 | 0 | 0 | 0 | |
| – | GK | Venezuela | Carlos Olses | 0 | 0 | 0 | 0 | 0 | 0 | 0 | 0 | 0 | 0 | 0 | 0 | |
| – | AM | Argentina | Nicolás Oroz | 0 | 0 | 0 | 0 | 0 | 0 | 0 | 0 | 0 | 0 | 0 | 0 | |
| – | CB | Paraguay | Juan Gabriel Patiño | 0 | 0 | 0 | 0 | 0 | 0 | 0 | 0 | 0 | 0 | 0 | 0 | |
| – | GK | Argentina | Leonel Piedrabuena | 0 | 0 | 0 | 0 | 0 | 0 | 0 | 0 | 0 | 0 | 0 | 0 | |
| – | CF | Argentina | Andrés Ríos | 0 | 0 | 0 | 0 | 0 | 0 | 0 | 0 | 0 | 0 | 0 | 0 | |
| – | DF | Uruguay | José Luis Rodríguez | 0 | 0 | 0 | 0 | 0 | 0 | 0 | 0 | 0 | 0 | 0 | 0 | |
| – | AM | Argentina | Santiago Rosales | 0 | 0 | 0 | 0 | 0 | 0 | 0 | 0 | 0 | 0 | 0 | 0 | |
| – | GK | Argentina | Nicolás Stella | 0 | 0 | 0 | 0 | 0 | 0 | 0 | 0 | 0 | 0 | 0 | 0 | |
| – | CB | Argentina | Héctor Villalba | 0 | 0 | 0 | 0 | 0 | 0 | 0 | 0 | 0 | 0 | 0 | 0 | |
| – | CB | Argentina | Sergio Vittor | 0 | 0 | 0 | 0 | 0 | 0 | 0 | 0 | 0 | 0 | 0 | 0 | |
| Own goals | | | | — | 0 | — | 0 | — | 0 | — | 0 | — | 0 | — | — | — |

Statistics accurate as of 1 September 2019.

=== Goalscorers ===
| Rank | Pos | No. | Nat | Name | League | Cup | League Cup | Continental | Total | Ref |
|---|---|---|---|---|---|---|---|---|---|---|
| 1 | DM | 23 | Argentina | Nery Domínguez | 1 | 0 | 0 | 0 | 1 | |
| 1 | RB | 4 | Argentina | Iván Pillud | 1 | 0 | 0 | 0 | 1 | |
| 1 | RM | 18 | Argentina | Augusto Solari | 1 | 0 | 0 | 0 | 1 | |
| 1 | CF | 20 | Argentina | Darío Cvitanich | 1 | 0 | 0 | 0 | 1 | |
| 1 | CF | 15 | Argentina | Lisandro López | 1 | 0 | 0 | 0 | 1 | |
| 1 | DM | 8 | Argentina | Diego González | 1 | 0 | 0 | 0 | 1 | |
| Own goals | | | | | 0 | 0 | 0 | 0 | 0 | |
| Totals | | | | | 6 | 0 | 0 | 0 | 6 | — |
