= 2018–19 Racing Club de Avellaneda season =

Racing Club de Avellaneda
2018–19 season
- Manager: Eduardo Coudet
- Stadium: Estadio Juan Domingo Perón
- Primera División: 1st
- Copa Argentina: Round of 64
- Copa Libertadores: Round of 16
- Top goalscorer: League: Lisandro López (17); All: Lisandro López (18)
Home colours	Away colours	Third colours

The 2018–19 season was Racing Club de Avellaneda's 34th consecutive season in the top-flight of Argentine football. The season covered the period from 10 August 2018 to 7 April 2019. The club won their 18th league title, and first in five seasons since 2014.

== Players ==
=== First-team squad ===
As of 1 March 2019.

Note: Flags indicate national team as defined under FIFA eligibility rules; some limited exceptions apply. Players may hold more than one non-FIFA nationality.

No.	Pos.	Nation	Player
1	GK	CHI	Gabriel Arias
2	DF	ARG	Alejandro Donatti
3	DF	ARG	Alexis Soto
4	DF	ARG	Iván Pillud
5	DF	CHI	Eugenio Mena
6	DF	ARG	Lucas Orbán
7	FW	COL	Mateo Cassierra (on loan from Ajax)
8	MF	ARG	Guillermo Fernández
9	FW	ARG	Jonatan Cristaldo
10	MF	ARG	Ricardo Centurión
11	FW	ARG	Andrés Ríos
13	GK	ARG	Javier García
14	DF	ARG	Rodrigo Schlegel
15	FW	ARG	Lisandro López
16	MF	ARG	Mauricio Martínez
17	MF	ARG	Martín Ojeda

No.	Pos.	Nation	Player
18	MF	ARG	Augusto Solari
19	MF	ARG	Neri Cardozo
20	FW	ARG	Darío Cvitanich
21	MF	CHI	Marcelo Díaz
23	MF	ARG	Nery Domínguez
24	MF	ARG	Julián López
25	GK	ARG	Gastón Gómez
26	DF	ARG	Renzo Saravia
28	MF	ARG	Federico Zaracho
29	FW	ARG	Alexis Cuello
30	DF	ARG	Leonardo Sigali
33	MF	ARG	Evelio Cardozo
—	GK	ARG	Federico Escobar
—	GK	VEN	Carlos Olces (on loan from La Guaira)
—	MF	ARG	Juan Sánchez de León

==== Out on loan ====
Note: Flags indicate national team as defined under FIFA eligibility rules; some limited exceptions apply. Players may hold more than one non-FIFA nationality.

No.	Pos.	Nation	Player
—	GK	ARG	Nicolás Stella (at Gimnasia y Esgrima (J))
—	DF	ARG	Miguel Barbieri (at Rosario Central)
—	DF	ARG	Yonathan Cabral (at Atlético Tucumán)
—	DF	ARG	Cristian Marcial (at Fénix)
—	DF	PAR	Juan Patiño (at Belgrano)
—	DF	ARG	Gonzalo Piovi (at Gimnasia y Esgrima (LP))
—	MF	ARG	Nelson Acevedo (at Unión Santa Fe)
—	MF	ARG	Braian Álvarez (at Unión Santa Fe)
—	MF	ARG	Facundo Castillón (at Aldosivi)
—	MF	ARG	Diego González (at Tijuana)

No.	Pos.	Nation	Player
—	MF	ARG	Facundo Gutiérrez (at Gimnasia y Esgrima (LP))
—	MF	ARG	Marcelo Meli (at Belgrano)
—	MF	ARG	Nicolás Oroz (at O'Higgins)
—	MF	ARG	Martín Pérez Guedes (at Defensores de Belgrano)
—	MF	ARG	Santiago Rosales (at Gimnasia y Esgrima (LP))
—	FW	ARG	Juan Dinenno (at Deportivo Cali)
—	FW	ARG	Braian Guille (at Brown)
—	FW	ARG	Augusto Lotti (at Unión Santa Fe)
—	FW	ARG	Ricardo Noir (at Atlético Tucumán)
—	FW	ARG	Braian Mansilla (at Gimnasia)

== Competitions ==
=== Superliga Argentina ===
==== League table ====
Pos	Team	Pld	W	D	L	GF	GA	GD	Pts	Qualification
1	Racing (C)	25	17	6	2	43	16	+27	57	Qualification for Copa Libertadores group stage
2	Defensa y Justicia	25	15	8	2	33	18	+15	53	Qualification for Copa Libertadores group stage
3	Boca Juniors	25	15	6	4	42	18	+24	51	Qualification for Copa Libertadores group stage
4	River Plate	25	13	6	6	42	21	+21	45	Qualification for Copa Libertadores group stage (Note: River Plate qualified for the Copa Libertadores group stage by winning the 2018–19 Copa Argentina.)
5	Atlético Tucumán	25	12	6	7	36	29	+7	42	Qualification for Copa Libertadores second stage

Source: AFA
Rules for classification: 1) points; 2) play-off (only if needed to decide championship); 3) goal difference; 4) goals scored; 5) head-to-head points; 6) head-to-head goal difference; 7) head-to-head goals scored.
(C) Champions

==== Matches ====
14 August 2018 1	Atletico Tucuman	2–2	Racing	Tucumán
				Stadium: Monumental José Fierro; Referee: Néstor Pitana

19 August 2018 2	Racing Club de Avellaneda	2–0	Club Atlético Vélez Sarsfield

24 August 2018 3	Club Atlético Patronato	0–3	Racing

2 September 2018 4	Racing	2–0	Rosario Central

=== Copa Argentina ===
July 21, 2019 Round of 64	Racing	0–0 (3–4 p)	Boca Unidos	Lanús, Pcia. de Buenos Aires
17:10		Report		Stadium: Ciudad de Lanús – Néstor Díaz Pérez; Referee: Hernán Mastrángelo
	Penalties
	López (penalty scored); Rojas (penalty scored); Barbona (penalty missed); Pillud (penalty scored); Cvitanich (penalty missed); Díaz (penalty missed)		(penalty scored) Baroni; (penalty scored) Ojeda; (penalty missed) Fabro; (penalty scored) A. Morales; (penalty missed) Vizcarra; (penalty scored) Alloco

=== 2018 Copa Libertadores ===
==== Group stage ====
Pos	Team	Pld	W	D	L	GF	GA	GD	Pts	Qualification	CRU	RAC	VAS	UCH
1	(Brazil) Cruzeiro	6	3	2	1	15	5	+10	11	Round of 16	—	2–1	0–0	7–0
2	(Argentina) Racing	6	3	2	1	12	6	+6	11	Round of 16	4–2	—	4–0	1–0
3	(Brazil) Vasco da Gama	6	1	2	3	3	10	−7	5	Copa Sudamericana	0–4	1–1	—	0–1
4	Universidad de Chile	6	1	2	3	2	11	−9	5		0–0	1–1	0–2	—

Source: CONMEBOL

27 February 2018 1	Racing (Argentina)	4–2	(Brazil) Cruzeiro	Estadio Presidente Juan Domingo Perón, Avellaneda
21:30 UTC−3	Martínez 13', 44', 62'; Solari 76'	Report	De Arrascaeta 29'; Robinho 69'	Attendance: 35,920; Referee: Wilmar Roldán (Colombia)

3 April 2018 2	Universidad de Chile	1–1	(Argentina) Racing	Estadio Nacional Julio Martínez Prádanos, Santiago
21:30 UTC−3	Pizarro 9'	Report	Donatti 22'	Attendance: 45,545; Referee: Enrique Cáceres (Paraguay)

19 April 2018 3	Racing (Argentina)	4–0	(Brazil) Vasco da Gama	Estadio Presidente Juan Domingo Perón, Avellaneda
19:15 UTC−3	Centurión 32'; Martínez 38'; Zaracho 51'; López 60' (pen.)	Report		Attendance: 41,893; Referee: Ulises Mereles (Paraguay)

26 April 2018 4	Vasco da Gama (Brazil)	1–1	(Argentina) Racing	Estádio São Januário, Rio de Janeiro
21:30 UTC−3	Wágner 80'	Report	Martínez 31'	Attendance: 10,346; Referee: Diego Haro (Peru)

3 May 2018 5	Racing (Argentina)	1–0	Universidad de Chile	Estadio Presidente Juan Domingo Perón, Avellaneda
19:15 UTC−3	Donatti 80'	Report		Attendance: 43,785; Referee: Enrique Cáceres (Paraguay)

22 May 2018 6	Cruzeiro (Brazil)	2–1	(Argentina) Racing	Estádio Mineirão, Belo Horizonte
21:30 UTC−3	Thiago Neves 2'; Lucas Silva 10'	Report	Centurión 27'	Attendance: 44,512; Referee: Andrés Rojas (Colombia)

==== Knockout phase ====
9 August 2018 Round of 16 1st leg	Racing (Argentina)	0–0	(Argentina) River Plate	Estadio Presidente Juan Domingo Perón, Avellaneda
19:30 UTC−3		Report		Referee: Anderson Daronco (Brazil)

29 August 2018 Round of 16 2nd leg	River Plate (Argentina)	3–0 (3–0 agg.)	(Argentina) Racing	Estadio Monumental Antonio Vespucio Liberti, Buenos Aires
19:30 UTC−3	Pratto 10'; Palacios 27'; Borré 80'	Report		Referee: Mario Díaz de Vivar (Paraguay)
