= 2019 Trofeo de Campeones de la Superliga Argentina =

2019 Trofeo de Campeones
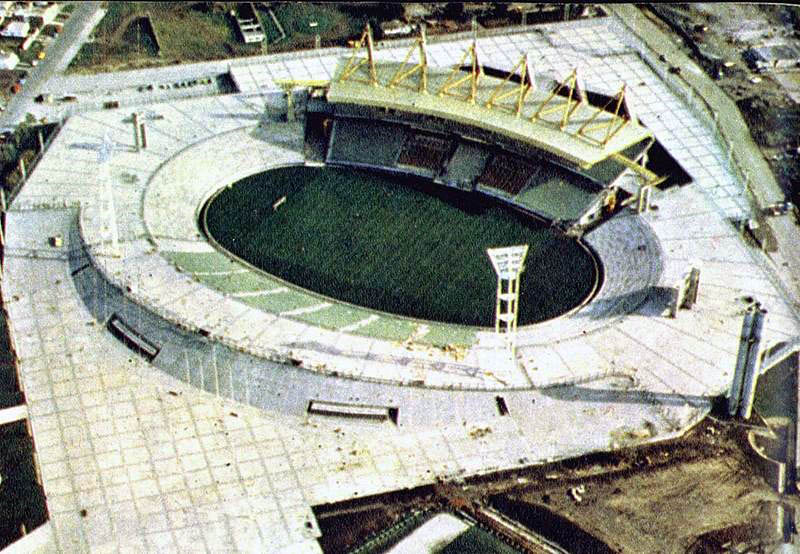
- Estadio José María Minella, venue
| Racing | Tigre |
| 2 | 0 |
- Date: 14 December 2019
- Venue: Estadio José María Minella, Mar del Plata
- Referee: Fernando Rapallini

The 2019 Trofeo de Campeones de la Superliga Argentina was the 1st edition of the Trofeo de Campeones de la Superliga Argentina, an annual football match contested by the winners of the Argentine Primera División and Copa de la Superliga competitions.

It was played on 14 December 2019 at the Estadio José María Minella in Mar del Plata between Racing and Tigre. Racing and Tigre qualified after winning the 2018–19 Argentine Primera División tournament and the 2019 Copa de la Superliga, respectively.

Racing defeated Tigre 2–0 to win their first title.

== Qualified teams ==
| Team | Qualification | Previous app. |
|---|---|---|
| Racing | 2018–19 Primera División champions | None |
| Tigre | 2019 Copa de la Superliga champions | None |

== Match ==
=== Details ===
14 December 2019
19:10 UTC−3

| Racing | 2–0 | Tigre |
|---|---|---|
| Rojas 30', 43' | Report |

Estadio José María Minella, Mar del Plata
Referee: Fernando Rapallini

| Racing | Tigre |

| GK | 1 | (Chile) Gabriel Arias |
| DF | 4 | (Argentina) Iván Pillud (c) |
| DF | 23 | (Argentina) Nery Domínguez | (yellow card) 63' |
| DF | 2 | (Argentina) Alejandro Donatti |
| DF | 5 | (Chile) Eugenio Mena | (yellow card) 23' |
| MF | 21 | (Chile) Marcelo Díaz |
| MF | 32 | (Argentina) Walter Montoya | | (substituted off) 84' |
| MF | 28 | (Argentina) Matías Zaracho | (yellow card) 36' | (substituted off) 74' |
| MF | 10 | (Paraguay) Matías Rojas |
| FW | 20 | (Argentina) Darío Cvitanich | (yellow card) 78' | (substituted off) 80' |
| FW | 9 | (Argentina) Jonatan Cristaldo |
Substitutes:
| GK | 13 | (Argentina) Javier García |
| DF | 3 | (Argentina) Alexis Soto |
| MF | 6 | (Argentina) Lucas Orbán | | (substituted in) 80' |
| MF | 11 | (Argentina) David Barbona |
| MF | 16 | (Argentina) Mauricio Martínez | | (substituted in) 74' |
| FW | 15 | (Argentina) Lisandro López | | (substituted in) 84' |
| FW | 29 | (Argentina) Nicolás Reniero |
Manager:
(Argentina) Eduardo Coudet

| GK | 23 | (Argentina) Gonzalo Marinelli |
| DF | 17 | (Argentina) Matías Pérez Acuña | (yellow card) 45' |
| DF | 2 | (Argentina) Ezequiel Rodríguez | | (substituted off) 84' |
| DF | 19 | (Uruguay) Gerardo Alcoba (c) |
| DF | 3 | (Argentina) Néstor Moiraghi |
| DF | 20 | (Argentina) Lucas Rodríguez | (yellow card) 79' |
| MF | 21 | (Argentina) Sebastián Prediger | (yellow card) 34' (yellow-red card) 70' |
| MF | 27 | (Argentina) Agustín Cardozo | | (substituted off) 62' |
| MF | 14 | (Argentina) Walter Montillo | (yellow card) 88' |
| FW | 10 | (Argentina) Diego Alberto Morales | (yellow card) 72' | (substituted off) 74' |
| FW | 9 | (Argentina) Emanuel Dening | (yellow card) 12' |
Substitutes:
| GK | 12 | (Argentina) Marco Wolff |
| MF | 5 | (Uruguay) Fabricio Domínguez |
| MF | 8 | (Argentina) Martín Galmarini |
| MF | 22 | (Argentina) Jorge Ortiz | | (substituted in) 74' |
| MF | 31 | (Uruguay) Maxi Rodríguez |
| FW | 7 | (Argentina) Carlos Luna | | (substituted in) 62' |
| FW | 11 | (Uruguay) Jonathan Ramis | | (substituted in) 84' |
Manager:
(Argentina) Néstor Gorosito

Assistant referees:
Maximiliano Del Yesso
Gerardo Carretero
Fourth official:
Diego Abal

Match rules

- 90 minutes.
- 30 minutes of extra time if necessary.
- Penalty shoot-out if scores still level.
- Seven named substitutes.
- Maximum of three substitutions, with a fourth allowed in extra time.

=== Statistics ===
Overall
| | Racing | Tigre |
|---|---|---|
| Goals scored | 2 | 0 |
| Total shots | 6 | 11 |
| Shots on target | 3 | 5 |
| Ball possession | 57% | 43% |
| Corner kicks | 5 | 5 |
| Fouls committed | 22 | 25 |
| Offsides | 5 | 2 |
| Yellow cards | 4 | 7 |
| Red cards | 0 | 1 |
