= Rodrigo Schlegel =

Argentine footballer (born 1997)

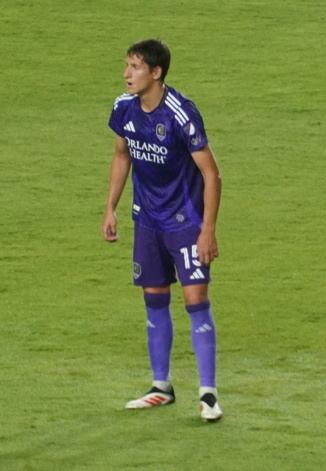
- Schlegel with Orlando City in 2025

Personal information
- Full name: Rodrigo Adrián Schlegel
- Date of birth: 3 April 1997 (age 29)
- Place of birth: Remedios de Escalada, Argentina
- Height: 1.85 m (6 ft 1 in)
- Position: Centre-back

Youth career
- Racing Club

Senior career*
Years	Team	Apps	(Gls)
2017–2020	Racing Club	5	(0)
2020	→ Orlando City (loan)	10	(0)
2021–2025	Orlando City	137	(2)
2022–2023	→ Orlando City B (loan)	2	(1)
2026	Atlas	25	(0)
- * Club domestic league appearances and goals as of 14:50, 12 September 2026 (UTC)

Rodrigo Adrián Schlegel (born 3 April 1997) is an Argentine professional footballer who plays as a centre-back.

Schlegel is a product of the Racing Club academy, and made six appearances for them across two seasons before joining American Major League Soccer club Orlando City on loan in 2020. Schlegel was signed to a permanent deal at the end of the season, and would go on to win the 2022 U.S. Open Cup with the club, their first trophy since joining the top flight.

== Club career ==
=== Racing Club ===
Schlegel came through the youth system at Racing Club, transitioning from the U-20 side to Racing Club II in 2017 before making his senior debut on 2 December 2017, starting in a 2–2 draw against Newell's Old Boys.

=== Orlando City ===
On 23 December 2019, Schlegel signed a one-year loan deal with MLS side Orlando City ahead of the 2020 season. He made his debut on March 7, starting in a 2–1 defeat away to Colorado Rapids. It was his only appearance before the season was disrupted by the COVID-19 pandemic. Instead MLS held a World Cup-style tournament by way of the MLS is Back Tournament. Schlegel made three appearances during the competition, all as a substitute within the final 10 minutes of games in which Orlando were winning by a one-goal margin, entering as a third centre-back to help see out games. They won all three games in which he appeared.

An unused substitute in four of the first five games upon the return to regular season play, Schlegel was handed only his third start of the season against Florida rivals Inter Miami on September 12 and was caught up in controversy when he was temporarily sent off for a second yellow card and conceded a penalty. Initially not called, the disciplinary action came from VAR before a second consultation spotted an offside which negated the play. Despite the drama, Schlegel was not only noted for his strong defensive display but also his battling and passionate demeanor. As a result, he was trusted to start in four of the next five games with Orlando in the midst of a club record unbeaten streak before seeing out the season as a substitute.

On 21 November 2020, Orlando played their first MLS playoff game in history against New York City FC. With the score tied 1–1 in extra-time and Orlando playing down a man, Schlegel again substituted into a back three in the 101st minute to help see out the draw. The game went to a penalty shootout in which Schlegel served as an emergency goalkeeper after Pedro Gallese received a second yellow card for leaving his goal line before a penalty was struck, a move that is illegal during penalties. Orlando initially attempted to make a substitution to bring in backup goalkeeper Brian Rowe into the game with Schlegel coming off, however this substitution was eventually disallowed following a long delay, and Rowe was moved back to the bench. Schlegel conceded two successful penalties before making a crucial save against Guðmundur Þórarinsson, then a decisive penalty converted by Orlando's Benji Michel helped Orlando to a 6–5 win and a place in the conference semi-finals.

Schlegel had his loan move made permanent as part of the club's end of season roster moves on 2 December 2020.

On 27 May 2022, Schlegel was fined by the MLS Disciplinary Committee for failing to leave the field in a timely manner after receiving a red card during a match against Austin FC five days earlier.

On 25 November 2023, during a match against Columbus Crew, Schlegel received a second yellow card for a foul committed on Diego Rossi. Schlegel initially refused to leave the field and five days later he was fined by the MLS Disciplinary Committee for the disruption.

=== Atlas ===
On 16 December 2025, Schlegel signed with Liga MX club Atlas in exchange for a reported $600,000. On 9 January 2026, Schlegel started and played the full opening match of Atlas' Torneo Clausura campaign against Puebla as Atlas won 1–0.

Due to the impending expected signing of Kevin Zenón, Atlas would go over Liga MX's foreign player limit of nine players. Atlas entered negotiations to terminate Schlegel's contract in order to be compliant with league rules. On 11 September 2026, Schlegel's contract with Atlas was terminated. Prior to the termination, Schlegel had become a regular starter for Atlas and had expressed his desire to stay with the club for years. He was the second foreign player to have their contract terminated to make room for the signing of another foreign player by Atlas during the season, the first being Gustavo Ferrareis to make room for Adonis Frías.

== Career statistics ==
As of 12 September 2026

Club	Season	League			National cup		Continental		Playoffs		Other		Total	
Club	Season	Division	Apps	Goals	Apps	Goals	Apps	Goals	Apps	Goals	Apps	Goals	Apps	Goals
Racing Club	2017–18	Superliga	4	0	—		—		—		—		4	0
Racing Club	2018–19	Superliga	1	0	—		1 (Note: Appearance in Copa Sudamericana)	0	—		—		2	0
Racing Club	Total		5	0	—		1	0	—		—		6	0
Orlando City (loan)	2020	Major League Soccer	10	0	—		—		1	0	2 (Note: Appearances in MLS is Back Tournament knockout stage)	0	13	0
Orlando City	2021	Major League Soccer	23	0	—		—		—		—		23	0
Orlando City	2022	Major League Soccer	29	1	6	1	—		1	0	—		36	2
Orlando City	2023	Major League Soccer	26	0	1	0	2 (Note: Appearances in CONCACAF Champions Cup)	0	3	0	—		32	0
Orlando City	2024	Major League Soccer	28	1	—		2	0	5	0	1 (Note: Appearances in Leagues Cup)	0	36	1
Orlando City	2025	Major League Soccer	31	0	2	0	—		1	0	6	1	40	1
Orlando City	Total		147	2	9	1	4	0	11	0	9	1	180	4
Orlando City B (loan)	2022	MLS Next Pro	1	0	—		—		—		—		1	0
Orlando City B (loan)	2023	MLS Next Pro	1	1	—		—		—		—		1	1
Orlando City B (loan)	Total		2	1	—		—		—		—		2	1
Atlas	2025–26	Liga MX	18	0	—		—		—		—		18	0
Atlas	2026–27	Liga MX	7	0	—		—		—		2	0	9	0
Atlas	Total		25	0	0	0	0	0	0	0	2	0	27	0
Career total			179	3	9	1	5	0	11	0	11	1	215	5

== Honours ==
Racing Club

- Superliga Argentina: 2018–19
- Trofeo de Campeones de la Superliga Argentina: 2019

Orlando City

- U.S. Open Cup: 2022
