= Matías Zaracho =

Argentine footballer

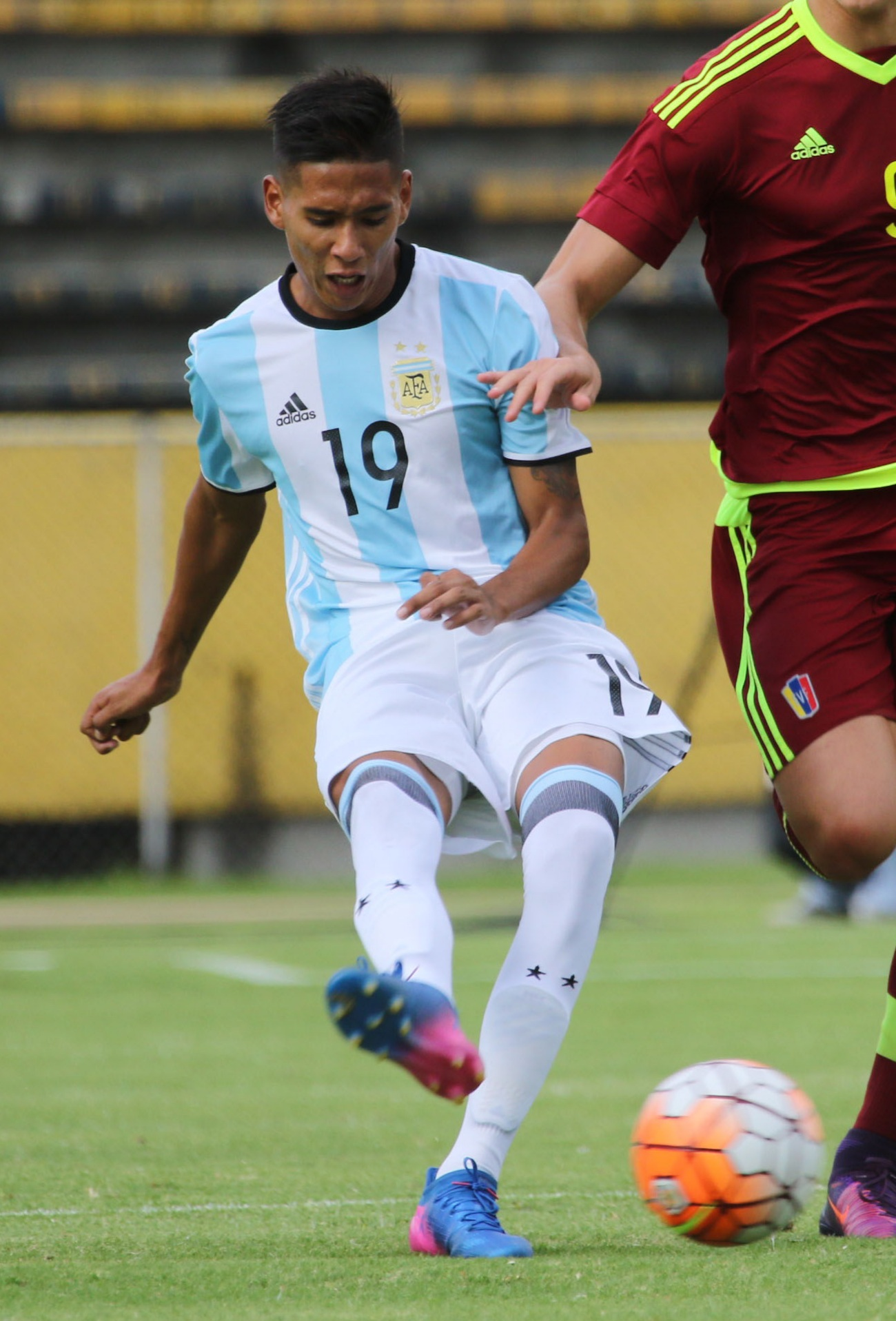
- Zaracho in 2017

Personal information
- Full name: Federico Matías Javier Zaracho
- Date of birth: 10 March 1998 (age 28)
- Place of birth: Wilde, Buenos Aires, Argentina
- Height: 1.74 m (5 ft 9 in)
- Position: Attacking midfielder

Team information
- Current team: Racing Club
- Number: 11

Youth career
- 2006–2017: Racing Club

Senior career*
Years	Team	Apps	(Gls)
2016–2020	Racing Club	68	(9)
2020–2025	Atlético Mineiro	140	(16)
2025–	Racing Club	43	(5)

International career^{‡}
2017	Argentina U20	7	(1)
2019–2020	Argentina U23	8	(1)
2019	Argentina	1	(0)
- * Club domestic league appearances and goals as of 18:05, 8 November 2026 (UTC) ‡ National team caps and goals as of 16 October 2020

Federico Matías Javier Zaracho (born 10 March 1998) is an Argentine professional footballer who plays as an attacking midfielder for Racing Club.

== Club career ==
Zaracho came up through the youth ranks of Racing Club. He made his league debut on 17 December 2016 against Union de Santa Fe.

On 16 October 2020, Zaracho joined Brazilian club Atlético Mineiro with the club acquiring 50% of his player rights for $7 million.

On 8 January 2025, Zaracho returned to Argentina and his former team Racing Club, with Atlético Mineiro selling 50% of his rights for $2.3 million.

== International career ==
Zaracho made his debut for the Argentina national team on 26 March 2019 in a friendly against Morocco, as a 76th-minute substitute for Leandro Paredes.

== Career statistics ==
=== Club ===
As of 12 March 2026

Appearances and goals by club, season and competition
Club	Season	League			National cup		League cup		Continental		State League		Other		Total	
Club	Season	Division	Apps	Goals	Apps	Goals	Apps	Goals	Apps	Goals	Apps	Goals	Apps	Goals	Apps	Goals
Racing Club	2016–17	Primera División	4	1	2	1	—		5 (Note: Appearances in the Copa Sudamericana)	0	—		—		11	2
Racing Club	2017–18	Primera División	22	1	0	0	—		8 (Note: Appearances in the Copa Libertadores)	1	—		—		30	2
Racing Club	2018–19	Primera División	23	3	1	0	4	0	1	0	—		—		29	3
Racing Club	2019–20	Primera División	19	4	0	0	1	0	2	1	—		1 (Note: Appearance in the Trofeo de Campeones de la Superliga Argentina)	0	23	5
Racing Club	Total		68	9	3	1	5	0	16	2	—		1	0	93	12
Atlético Mineiro	2020	Série A	13	1	—		—		—		—		—		13	1
Atlético Mineiro	2021	Série A	32	7	7	2	—		10	3	9 (Note: Appearances in the Campeonato Mineiro)	1	—		58	13
Atlético Mineiro	2022	Série A	26	2	2	0	—		6	0	9	0	0	0	43	2
Atlético Mineiro	2023	Série A	27	2	4	1	—		9	0	4	0	—		44	3
Atlético Mineiro	2024	Série A	16	2	6	1	—		7	0	4	1	—		33	4
Atlético Mineiro	Total		114	14	19	4	—		32	3	26	2	—		191	23
Racing Club	2025	Primera División	14	1	0	0	—		6	0	—		2 (Note: Appearances in Recopa Sudamericana)	1	22	2
Racing Club	2026	Primera División	9	0	0	0	—		0	0	—		—		9	0
Racing Club	Total		23	1	0	0	—		6	0	—		2	1	31	2
Career total			205	24	22	5	5	0	54	5	26	2	3	1	315	37

== Honours ==
Racing Club

- Argentine Primera División: 2018–19
- Trofeo de Campeones de la Superliga Argentina: 2019
- Recopa Sudamericana: 2025

Atlético Mineiro

- Campeonato Brasileiro Série A: 2021
- Copa do Brasil: 2021
- Campeonato Mineiro: 2021, 2022, 2023, 2024
- Supercopa do Brasil: 2022

Argentina U23

- Pre-Olympic Tournament: 2020

Individual

- Primera División Best Newcomer: 2018–19
- Bola de Prata Best Newcomer: 2021
