= Mateo Cassierra =

Colombian footballer (born 1997)

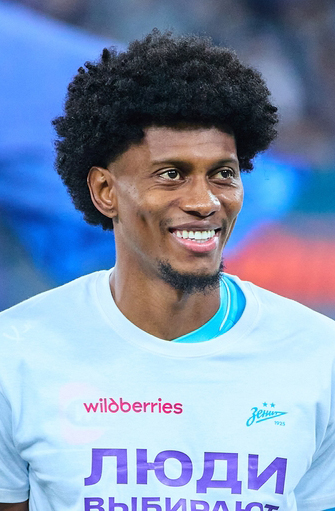
- Cassierra with Zenit Saint Petersburg in 2025

Personal information
- Full name: Zander Mateo Cassierra Cabezas
- Date of birth: 13 April 1997 (age 29)
- Place of birth: Barbacoas, Colombia
- Height: 1.86 m (6 ft 1 in)
- Position: Forward

Team information
- Current team: Atlético Mineiro
- Number: 9

Senior career*
Years	Team	Apps	(Gls)
2015–2016	Deportivo Cali	43	(12)
2016–2018	Jong Ajax	46	(29)
2016–2019	Ajax	21	(3)
2018	→ FC Groningen (loan)	10	(1)
2019	→ Racing (loan)	0	(0)
2019–2021	Belenenses SAD	63	(14)
2021–2022	Sochi	22	(14)
2022–2026	Zenit Saint Petersburg	96	(35)
2026–	Atlético Mineiro	11	(1)

International career^{‡}
2023–	Colombia	3	(1)
- * Club domestic league appearances and goals as of 7 April 2026 ‡ National team caps and goals as of 22 March 2024

Zander Mateo Cassierra Cabezas (born 13 April 1997) is a Colombian professional footballer who plays as a forward for Campeonato Brasileiro Série A club Atlético Mineiro and the Colombia national team.

== Career ==
=== Deportivo Cali ===
Cassierra made his debut for Deportivo Cali in 2015. Despite having played at Deportivo Cali with a jersey displaying "Casierra", his official name is spelled "Cassierra" (with two s's).

=== Ajax ===
On 17 June 2016, Cassierra signed a five-year contract with Dutch club Ajax, lasting until 2021. The club paid Deportivo Cali €5.5 million to complete the transfer. Cassierra is the third Colombian player to play for Ajax after Daniel Cruz (2000–2003) and Davinson Sánchez. He scored a goal in his Eredivisie debut against Sparta Rotterdam in a 1–3 win.

Cassierra spent the majority of the 2017–18 season playing for the reserves' team Jong Ajax, in the Eerste Divisie. He finished as top scorer of the reserves team with 18 goals scored, helping his side to clinch their first championship since joining the professional ranks and competing in the second tier of Dutch football.

==== Loans ====
On 2 June 2018, Ajax announced its loan, for one season, to FC Groningen. However, he returned after only half a season.

In January 2019, he joined Racing on loan until July 2020.

=== Sochi ===
On 26 August 2021, he signed a two-year contract with an additional one-year option with Russian Premier League club PFC Sochi. Cassierra finished 2021–22 Russian Premier League as the second-best goal scorer with 14 goals, behind Gamid Agalarov who scored 19, as Sochi finished in 2nd place, club's historical best position.

=== Zenit St. Petersburg ===
On 30 June 2022, Zenit St. Petersburg announced the signing of Cassierra to a three-year contract, with the option of an additional year.

After scoring only twice in the 2022–23 Russian Premier League, Cassierra started the 2023–24 season with 6 goals in the first 6 games, taking the top spot in the scoring race. He went into the winter break of the season in December with 14 goals, 6 goals ahead of the second-highest scorers. On 2 February 2024, Cassierra extended his contract with Zenit to June 2027.

On 19 May 2024, Cassierra scored 5 goals in a 5–1 victory over Akhmat Grozny. He became the first player to score 5 goals in a game since Russian Premier League was formed in 2002, and the third overall player to do so in the history of the Russian top-tier championship (following Viktor Panchenko in 1994 and Oleg Veretennikov in 1998). He finished the season as league's top scorer with 21 goals as Zenit came back on the last match day to claim their sixth consecutive title.

=== Atlético Mineiro ===
On 23 January 2026, Cassierra joined Brazilian club Atlético Mineiro on a four-year deal.

== Career statistics ==
=== Club ===
As of match played 6 December 2025

Appearances and goals by club, season and competition
Club	Season	League			National cup (Note: Includes Copa Colombia, KNVB Cup, Taça de Portugal, Russian Cup)		Continental		Other		Total	
Club	Season	Division	Apps	Goals	Apps	Goals	Apps	Goals	Apps	Goals	Apps	Goals
Deportivo Cali	2015	Categoría Primera A	23	8	10	3	—		—		33	11
Deportivo Cali	2016	Categoría Primera A	20	4	0	0	6	2	—		26	6
Deportivo Cali	Total		43	12	10	3	6	2	0	0	59	17
Ajax	2016–17	Eredivisie	17	2	3	2	9	0	—		29	4
Ajax	2017–18	Eredivisie	4	1	1	0	0	0	—		5	1
Ajax	Total		21	3	4	2	9	0	0	0	34	5
Jong Ajax	2016–17	Eerste Divisie	17	11	—		—		—		17	11
Jong Ajax	2017–18	Eerste Divisie	29	18	—		—		—		29	18
Jong Ajax	Total		46	29	0	0	0	0	0	0	46	29
Groningen	2018–19	Eredivisie	10	1	0	0	—		—		10	1
Jong Groningen	2018–19	Derde Divisie	2	1	—		—		—		2	1
Racing	2018–19	Argentine Primera División	0	0	—		0	0	2 (Note: Appearances in Copa de la Superliga)	0	2	0
Racing	2019–20	Argentine Primera División	0	0	—		—		—		0	0
Racing	Total		0	0	0	0	0	0	2	0	2	0
Belenenses SAD	2019–20	Primeira Liga	29	4	1	0	—		—		30	4
Belenenses SAD	2020–21	Primeira Liga	32	10	4	1	—		—		36	11
Belenenses SAD	2021–22	Primeira Liga	2	0	—		—		1 (Note: Appearance in Taça da Liga)	0	3	0
Belenenses SAD	Total		63	14	5	1	0	0	1	0	69	15
Sochi	2021–22	Russian Premier League	22	14	1	0	–		–		23	14
Zenit Saint Petersburg	2022–23	Russian Premier League	26	2	6	3	—		1 (Note: Appearance in Russian Super Cup)	0	33	5
Zenit Saint Petersburg	2023–24	Russian Premier League	28	21	9	3	—		1	0	38	24
Zenit Saint Petersburg	2024–25	Russian Premier League	30	8	8	4	—		1	0	39	12
Zenit Saint Petersburg	2025–26	Russian Premier League	12	4	4	3	—		—		16	7
Zenit Saint Petersburg	Total		96	35	27	13	–		3	0	126	48
Career total			303	109	47	19	15	2	6	0	371	130

=== International ===
As of match played 22 March 2024

Appearances and goals by national team and year
National team	Year	Apps	Goals
Colombia	2023	2	1
Colombia	2024	1	0
Total		3	1

Scores and results list Colombia's goal tally first.

No.	Date	Venue	Opponent	Score	Result	Competition
1.	16 June 2023	Mestalla Stadium, Valencia, Spain	Iraq	1–0	1–0	Friendly

== Honours ==
Ajax

- UEFA Europa League runner-up: 2016–17

Jong Ajax

- Eerste Divisie: 2017–18

Racing Club

- Primera División: 2018–19

Zenit Saint Petersburg

- Russian Premier League: 2022–23, 2023–24, 2025–26
- Russian Cup: 2023–24
- Russian Super Cup: 2022, 2023, 2024

=== Individual ===
- Russian Premier League Forward of the Season: 2021–22
- Russian Premier League Top scorer: 2023–24 (21 goals).
