= Gastón Gómez =

Argentine footballer

Personal information
- Full name: Gastón Gómez
- Date of birth: 4 March 1996 (age 30)
- Place of birth: Mar del Plata, Argentina
- Height: 1.90 m (6 ft 3 in)
- Position: Goalkeeper

Team information
- Current team: Racing Club

Youth career
- Racing Club

Senior career*
Years	Team	Apps	(Gls)
2017–	Racing Club	42	(0)
2023	→ Vélez Sarsfield (loan)	17	(0)
2024	→ San Lorenzo (loan)	19	(0)
2025	→ Deportes Concepción (loan)	7	(0)
- * Club domestic league appearances and goals as of 24 December 2025

Gastón Gómez (born 4 March 1996) is an Argentine professional footballer who plays as a goalkeeper for Racing Club.

== Career ==
Gómez started his career with Racing Club. After being promoted into the club's first-team in 2017, he was first an unused substitute for an Argentine Primera División match with San Lorenzo on 27 May. Less than a week later, Gómez made his professional debut in the Copa Sudamericana against Rionegro Águilas; he was subbed on early following an injury to Juan Musso. He made his first three appearances in league football in June 2017, featuring in matches against River Plate, Colón and Banfield.

In June 2025, Gómez moved to Chile and joined Deportes Concepción in the Liga de Ascenso on a loan until the end of the year.

== Career statistics ==
As of 12 May 2018.

Club statistics
Club	Season	League			Cup (Note: Includes the Copa Argentina)		League Cup		Continental (Note: Includes the Copa Libertadores and Copa Sudamericana)		Other		Total	
Club	Season	Division	Apps	Goals	Apps	Goals	Apps	Goals	Apps	Goals	Apps	Goals	Apps	Goals
Racing Club	2016–17	Primera División	3	0	0	0	—		2 (Note: Two appearances in 2017 Copa Sudamericana)	0	0	0	5	0
Racing Club	2017–18	Primera División	2	0	0	0	—		2 (Note: Two appearances in 2017 Copa Sudamericana)	0	0	0	4	0
Career total			5	0	0	0	—		4	0	0	0	9	0

== Honours ==
Racing Club

- Argentine Primera División: 2018–19
- Trofeo de Campeones de la Superliga Argentina: 2019
- Trofeo de Campeones de la Liga Profesional: 2022
