= Julián López (footballer, born 2000) =

Argentine footballer

Personal information
- Full name: Julián Alejo López
- Date of birth: 8 January 2000 (age 26)
- Place of birth: Avellaneda, Argentina
- Height: 1.82 m (5 ft 11 1/2 in)
- Position: Midfielder

Team information
- Current team: Defensa y Justicia
- Number: 55

Youth career
- Racing Club

Senior career*
Years	Team	Apps	(Gls)
2018–2023	Racing Club	19	(0)
2022	→ Ferro (loan)	12	(0)
2022–2023	→ Defensa y Justicia (loan)	49	(0)
2024–	Defensa y Justicia	35	(0)
2025	→ Tigre (loan)	29	(1)

International career
2019	Argentina U20	5	(1)
- * Club domestic league appearances and goals as of 17:56, 10 May 2026 (UTC)

Julián Alejo López (born 8 January 2000) is an Argentine professional footballer who plays as a midfielder for Defensa y Justicia.

== Career ==
=== Club ===
López began his career in the system of Racing Club. He first experienced first-team football in October 2018, with manager Eduardo Coudet selecting him as a substitute for an Argentine Primera División match against Boca Juniors. Racing Club drew the match 2–2, with López coming on for the final minutes in place of Marcelo Díaz. On 16 February 2022, López joined Primera Nacional club Ferro Carril Oeste on a one-year loan deal. However, the spell at Ferro was cut short and on 29 June 2022, he was instead loaned out to Defensa y Justicia until the end of 2023 with a purchase option set at 700 thousand dollars for 50% of the pass.

=== International ===
López has represented Argentina at U20 level, notably scoring against Ecuador in a friendly on 15 October 2018. January 2019 saw López receive a call-up to the South American U-20 Championship in Chile, as an injury replacement for Agustín Almendra.

== Career statistics ==
As of 28 December 2019.

Club statistics
Club	Season	League			Cup		Continental		Other		Total	
Club	Season	Division	Apps	Goals	Apps	Goals	Apps	Goals	Apps	Goals	Apps	Goals
Racing Club	2018–19	Primera División	7	0	0	0	1 (Note: Appearances in the Copa Sudamericana.)	0	0	0	8	0
Career total			7	0	0	0	1	0	0	0	8	0
