= Gonzalo Córdoba =

Argentine footballer (born 2000)

Personal information
- Full name: Gonzalo Germán Córdoba
- Date of birth: 29 March 2000 (age 26)
- Place of birth: Villa Domínico, Argentina
- Height: 1.61 m (5 ft 3 in)
- Position: Midfielder

Team information
- Current team: Mitre

Youth career
- Racing Club

Senior career*
Years	Team	Apps	(Gls)
2018–2024	Racing Club	3	(0)
2019–2020	→ Barracas Central (loan)	1	(0)
2020–2021	→ U. de Concepción (loan)	2	(0)
2022–2023	→ Al Jazirah Al Hamra (loan)	24	(13)
2023–2024	→ Dibba Al Fujairah (loan)		
2024–2025	Cerro Largo	9	(1)
2025–2026	East Riffa		
2026–	Mitre	1	(0)

International career^{‡}
2015	Argentina U15	5	(2)
- * Club domestic league appearances and goals as of 17:22, 2 May 2026 (UTC) ‡ National team caps and goals as of 22:25, 27 April 2022 (UTC)

Gonzalo Germán Córdoba (born 29 March 2000) is an Argentine professional footballer who plays as a midfielder for Mitre.

== Club career ==
Córdoba signed his first professional contract with Racing Club in 2016, and was promoted to their first team in 2018. He was loaned to Argentine club Barracas Central in 2019. He made his professional debut with Barracas Central in a 1–0 Primera Nacional win over Independiente Rivadavia on 11 March 2019. He moved to the Chilean club Universidad de Concepción in 2019, before returning to Racing Club in 2021.

== International career ==
Córdoba is a youth international for Argentina, having represented the Argentina U15s.
