= Iván Pillud =

Argentine footballer

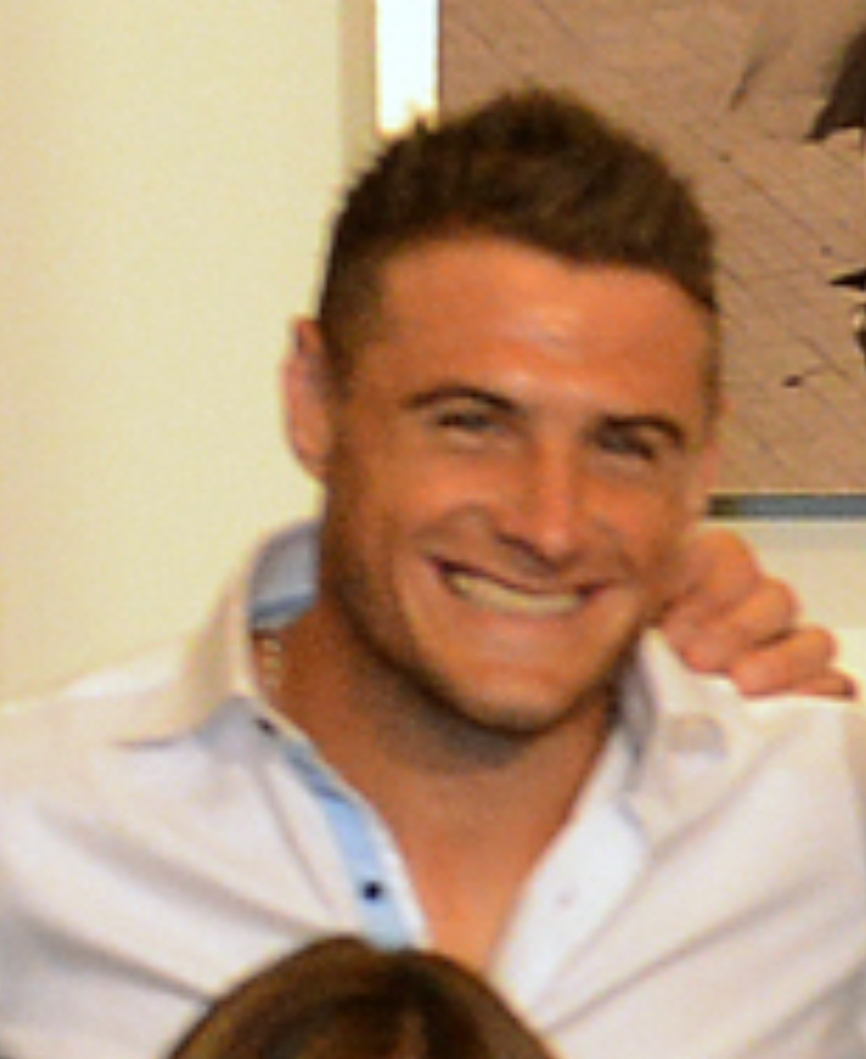
- Pillud with Racing Club in 2014

Personal information
- Full name: Iván Alexis Pillud
- Date of birth: 24 April 1986 (age 40)
- Place of birth: Capitán Bermúdez, Argentina
- Height: 1.78 m (5 ft 10 in)
- Position: Right-back

Youth career
- San Lorenzo
- 2005–2007: Tiro Federal

Senior career*
Years	Team	Apps	(Gls)
2007–2010	Tiro Federal	26	(0)
2008–2009	→ Newell's Old Boys (loan)	19	(0)
2009–2010	→ Espanyol (loan)	9	(0)
2010–2024	Racing Club	254	(6)
2014	→ Verona (loan)	6	(0)
2024–2025	Central Córdoba	17	(0)

International career
2011	Argentina	5	(0)
- * Club domestic league appearances and goals as of 17:11, 29 December 2025 (UTC)

Iván Alexis Pillud (born 24 April 1986) is an Argentine professional footballer who plays as a right-back.

He spent the vast majority of his career at Racing Club.

== Club career ==
Born in Capitán Bermúdez, Santa Fe Province, Pillud began his playing career in 2005 in the Primera Nacional with Tiro Federal. In 2008, he made his Primera División debut after being loaned to Newell's Old Boys.

In July 2009, Pillud joined Spanish club RCD Espanyol, also on loan. He scarcely appeared during his only season, his debut coming on 30 August in a 1–0 La Liga away loss against Athletic Bilbao.

Pillud returned to his homeland for the 2010–11 campaign, signing for Racing Club de Avellaneda. On 31 January 2014 he moved teams and countries again, being loaned to Hellas Verona FC in Italy with an option for a permanent contract. He played his first game in Serie A on 23 March, coming on as 68th-minute substitute in a 5–0 defeat at UC Sampdoria.

On 1 July 2024, aged 38 and having won several titles, Pillud left the Estadio Presidente Juan Domingo Perón and joined fellow top-flight side Central Córdoba de Santiago del Estero on a one-year deal.

== International career ==
Pillud earned his first cap for Argentina on 16 March 2011, playing the first half of a 4–1 friendly win over Venezuela. He made a further four appearances that year, also in non-competitive matches.

== Honours ==
Racing Club

- Argentine Primera División: 2014, 2018–19
- Trofeo de Campeones de la Superliga Argentina: 2019
- Trofeo de Campeones de la Liga Profesional: 2022
- Supercopa Internacional: 2022

Central Córdoba

- Copa Argentina: 2024
