= Braian Álvarez =

Argentine footballer

Personal information
- Full name: Braian Gabriel Álvarez
- Date of birth: 22 August 1997 (age 29)
- Place of birth: Mar del Plata, Argentina
- Height: 1.71 m (5 ft 7 1/2 in)
- Position: Left midfielder

Youth career
- Racing Club

Senior career*
Years	Team	Apps	(Gls)
2017–2023	Racing Club	1	(0)
2017–2018	→ Ferro Carril Oeste (loan)	16	(1)
2018–2020	→ Unión Santa Fe (loan)	8	(0)
2020–2021	→ Agropecuario (loan)	30	(0)
2022	→ Ferro Carril Oeste (loan)	10	(1)
2023–2024	Guillermo Brown	40	(1)
2025	Deportes Santa Cruz	9	(1)
- * Club domestic league appearances and goals as of 1 February 2026

Braian Gabriel Álvarez (born 22 August 1997) is an Argentine professional footballer who plays as a left midfielder.

== Career ==
Álvarez made his professional debut in the Argentine Primera División on 27 May 2017, he was substituted on for the final minutes of a 2–1 victory for Racing Club over San Lorenzo. On 13 September, Racing Club allowed Álvarez to join Primera B Nacional's Ferro Carril Oeste on loan. He scored his first career goal in his tenth appearance, netting in an away win against Sarmiento. In total, Álvarez made sixteen appearances for Ferro Carril Oeste. Álvarez was loaned to Primera División side Unión Santa Fe in July 2018. Having spent two years there, Álvarez appeared nine times in all competitions.

In 2025, Álvarez moved abroad and signed with Chilean club Deportes Santa Cruz.

== Career statistics ==
As of 3 July 2020.

Club statistics
Club	Season	League			Cup		League Cup		Continental		Other		Total	
Club	Season	Division	Apps	Goals	Apps	Goals	Apps	Goals	Apps	Goals	Apps	Goals	Apps	Goals
Racing Club	2016–17	Primera División	1	0	0	0	—		0	0	0	0	1	0
Racing Club	2017–18	Primera División	0	0	0	0	—		0	0	0	0	0	0
Racing Club	2018–19	Primera División	0	0	0	0	0	0	0	0	0	0	0	0
Racing Club	2019–20	Primera División	0	0	0	0	0	0	0	0	0	0	0	0
Racing Club	Total		1	0	0	0	0	0	0	0	0	0	1	0
Ferro Carril Oeste (loan)	2017–18	Primera B Nacional	16	1	0	0	—		—		0	0	16	1
Unión Santa Fe (loan)	2018–19	Primera División	3	0	0	0	0	0	0	0	0	0	3	0
Unión Santa Fe (loan)	2019–20	Primera División	5	0	1	0	0	0	0	0	0	0	6	0
Unión Santa Fe (loan)	Total		8	0	1	0	0	0	0	0	0	0	9	0
Career total			25	1	1	0	0	0	0	0	0	0	26	1
