= Facundo Castillón =

Argentine footballer (born 1986)

Personal information
- Full name: Facundo Andrés Castillón
- Date of birth: 21 August 1986 (age 40)
- Place of birth: Rosario, Argentina
- Height: 1.78 m (5 ft 10 in)
- Positions: Winger; forward

Youth career
- Argentino Rosario

Senior career*
Years	Team	Apps	(Gls)
2005–2006	Argentino Rosario	22	(5)
2006–2010	Tiro Federal	87	(10)
2010–2011	Olimpo	19	(0)
2011–2014	Godoy Cruz	98	(10)
2014–2019	Racing Club	12	(2)
2015	→ Banfield (loan)	14	(1)
2016	→ Gimnasia La Plata (loan)	15	(0)
2016–2017	→ Getafe (loan)	18	(1)
2017–2018	→ Lanús (loan)	5	(0)
2018–2019	→ Aldosivi (loan)	8	(0)
2019	Levadiakos	6	(0)
2020–2021	Nueva Chicago	17	(2)
2022	Atlético de Rafaela	10	(0)
- * Club domestic league appearances and goals as of 18:07, 16 June 2022 (UTC)

Facundo Andrés Castillón (born 21 August 1986) is an Argentine footballer who plays as a winger or forward.

== Career ==
=== Early career ===
Born in Rosario, Santa Fe, Castillón finished his formation with Argentino de Rosario. He made his senior debut for the club, appearing in Primera C.

In 2006 Castillón joined Tiro Federal, freshly relegated to Primera B Nacional. He was a regular starter for the club during the following four seasons, scoring a career-best five goals in the 2009–10 season.

On 7 July 2010, Castillón signed for Club Olimpo, newly promoted to Primera División. He made his debut in the category on 8 August, starting in a 1–2 away loss against Banfield.

On 31 July 2011, Castillón moved to Godoy Cruz also in the first division. He scored his first goal in the main category on 27 September, netting the equalizer in a 1–1 draw at Newell's Old Boys.

=== Racing Club ===
In August 2014, Castillón agreed to a contract with fellow league team Racing Club, for a 10 million pesos fee. He made his debut for the club 10 August, in a 3–1 win at Defensa y Justicia, and scored his first goal in a 2–0 home success over San Lorenzo seven days later.

After being rarely used during the 2015 campaign, Castillón was loaned to Banfield until the end of the year. He was subsequently loaned to Gimnasia La Plata and later to Spanish side Getafe.

== Honours ==
Racing Club

- Primera División: 2014
