= Matías Rojas (footballer, born 1995) =

Paraguayan footballer

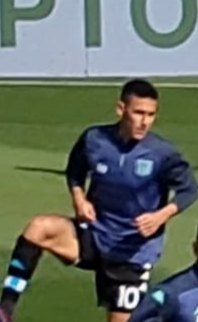

Personal information
- Full name: Matías Nicolás Rojas Romero
- Date of birth: 3 November 1995 (age 31)
- Place of birth: Asunción, Paraguay
- Height: 1.86 m (6 ft 1 in)
- Positions: Attacking midfielder; right winger

Team information
- Current team: Libertad
- Number: 7

Youth career
- Cerro Porteño

Senior career*
Years	Team	Apps	(Gls)
2014–2019	Cerro Porteño	31	(2)
2017–2018	→ Lanús (loan)	9	(0)
2018–2019	→ Defensa y Justicia (loan)	22	(10)
2019–2023	Racing Club	61	(6)
2023–2024	Corinthians	24	(0)
2024	Inter Miami	11	(4)
2025	River Plate	5	(1)
2025	Portland Timbers	8	(1)
2026–	Libertad	2	(0)

International career^{‡}
2019–	Paraguay	21	(1)
- * Club domestic league appearances and goals as of 20:08, 8 March 2026 (UTC) ‡ National team caps and goals as of 24 June 2024

Matías Nicolás Rojas Romero (born 3 November 1995) is a Paraguayan professional footballer who last plays as an attacking midfielder or right winger for División de Honor club Libertad and the Paraguay national football team.

== Club career ==
Rojas' first club in his career was Cerro Porteño. He made his debut for the Paraguayan Primera División club in March 2014 during a defeat to Nacional. A year later, Rojas netted his first senior goal on 13 March 2015 as Cerro Porteño beat Deportivo Capiatá 3–2 at the Estadio Defensores del Chaco. One further goal, against Sportivo Luqueño, followed as Rojas featured thirty-four times across 2015 and 2016. On 10 January 2017, Rojas was loaned to Lanús of the Argentine Primera División. He remained for seventeen months, making eighteen appearances and scoring once; in the Copa Argentina.

Rojas arrived back to Cerro Porteño on 30 June 2018, but returned to Argentina on loan weeks later after agreeing to join fellow Argentine Primera División side Defensa y Justicia. He scored on his first start, netting an equaliser in a 1–1 draw with Belgrano. Rojas departed Cerro Porteño permanently in June 2019, staying in Argentina after signing terms with Racing Club of the Primera División.

=== Corinthians ===
He would then move to Brazil, joining Corinthians on 11 July 2023.On 22 of July, Rojas made his debut for Corinthians in a 2-0 loss against Bahia.

=== Inter Miami ===
On 23 April 2024, Rojas transferred to Major League Soccer club Inter Miami on a free transfer. On 27 April he made his MLS debut in a 4-1 win against New England Revolution. Then on 4 May he scored his first two goals for Inter Miami in a thrashing 6-2 win against New York Red Bulls. He then scored against CF Montréal it resulted in a 2-3 win. On 9 December 2024, Inter Miami chose to not renew his contract.

=== River Plate ===
On 3 January 2025, he would go back to Argentina signing for River Plate on a free transfer keeping him at the club for their 2025 season. On 17 January he would make his debut for the club in a friendly in a 2-1 win against Chilean club Club Universidad de Chile. Rojas would then scored his first goal for the club on his debut in the Argentine Primera División for River Plate in a 1-1 draw against Platense.

=== Portland Timbers ===
On 19 August 2025, Rojas returned to the United States, signing a short-term deal with Portland Timbers.

== International career ==
On 2 March 2019, Rojas received a call-up to the Paraguay national team from Eduardo Berizzo ahead of that month's friendlies with Peru and Mexico. He made his debut on 22 March in the game against Peru, as a 66th-minute substitute for Cecilio Domínguez. Berizzo subsequently selected Rojas in his preliminary squad for the 2019 Copa América on 13 May, before making the official tournament squad on 29 May. He was selected for the 26-man final preliminary squad 2024 Copa América on June 15. He would make only appearance in one of their three games. as Paraguay were eliminated at the bottom of their group winning no games.

== Career statistics ==
=== Club ===
As of 1 July 2019

Club statistics
Club	Season	League			Cup		League Cup		Continental		Other		Total	
Club	Season	Division	Apps	Goals	Apps	Goals	Apps	Goals	Apps	Goals	Apps	Goals	Apps	Goals
Cerro Porteño	2014	Paraguayan Primera División	1	0	—		—		0	0	0	0	1	0
Cerro Porteño	2015	Paraguayan Primera División	19	2	—		—		0	0	0	0	19	2
Cerro Porteño	2016	Paraguayan Primera División	11	0	—		—		4 (Note: Appearance(s) in the Copa Sudamericana)	0	0	0	15	0
Cerro Porteño	2017	Paraguayan Primera División	0	0	—		—		0	0	0	0	0	0
Cerro Porteño	2018	Paraguayan Primera División	0	0	0	0	—		0	0	0	0	0	0
Cerro Porteño	2019	Paraguayan Primera División	0	0	0	0	—		0	0	0	0	0	0
Cerro Porteño	Total		31	2	0	0	—		4	0	0	0	35	2
Lanús (loan)	2016–17	Argentine Primera División	0	0	1	1	—		4 (Note: Appearance(s) in the Copa Libertadores)	0	0	0	5	1
Lanús (loan)	2017–18	Argentine Primera División	9	0	1	0	—		3	0	0	0	13	0
Lanús (loan)	Total		9	0	2	1	—		7	0	0	0	18	1
Defensa y Justicia (loan)	2018–19	Argentine Primera División	22	10	1	0	2	0	2	0	0	0	27	10
Career total			62	12	3	1	2	0	13	0	0	0	80	13

=== International ===
As of match played 24 June 2024

National team	Year	Apps	Goals
Paraguay	2019	7	0
Paraguay	2020	1	0
Paraguay	2021	2	0
Paraguay	2022	3	0
Paraguay	2023	5	1
Paraguay	2024	3	0
Total		21	1

== International goals ==
No.	Date	Venue	Opponent	Score	Result	Competition
1.	27 March 2023	Estadio Monumental David Arellano, Santiago, Chile	Chile	1–1	2–3	Friendly

== Honours ==
Cerro Porteño

- Paraguayan Primera División: 2015 Apertura

Racing Club

- Trofeo de Campeones de la Superliga Argentina: 2019
- Trofeo de Campeones de la Liga Profesional: 2022
- Supercopa Internacional: 2022

Inter Miami

- Supporters' Shield: 2024
