= Juan Patiño (footballer, born 1989) =

Paraguayan footballer

Personal information
- Full name: Juan Gabriel Patiño Martinez
- Date of birth: 29 November 1989 (age 36)
- Place of birth: Asunción, Paraguay
- Height: 1.81 m (5 ft 11 1/2 in)
- Position: Centre-back

Team information
- Current team: Guaraní
- Number: 24

Youth career
- Guarani

Senior career*
Years	Team	Apps	(Gls)
2010–2017	Guarani	87	(19)
2016–2017	→ Chiapas (loan)	30	(0)
2017–2021	Racing Club	3	(0)
2018	→ Olimpia (loan)	29	(3)
2019	→ Belgrano (loan)	3	(0)
2019–2020	→ Cerro Porteño (loan)	39	(3)
2020–2023	Cerro Porteño	96	(6)
2023	Central Cordoba	4	(0)
2024	Sportivo Ameliano	28	(1)
2025–	Guaraní	8	(0)

International career^{‡}
2015–	Paraguay	3	(0)
- * Club domestic league appearances and goals as of 1 June 2025 ‡ National team caps and goals as of 15 July 2017

Juan Gabriel Patiño Martinez (born 29 November 1989) is a Paraguayan professional footballer who plays as a centre-back for Guaraní.

== Career ==
Patiño has played club football for Guarani.

He was called to be international with Paraguay in September 2015.
