= Eugenio Mena =

Chilean footballer (born 1988)

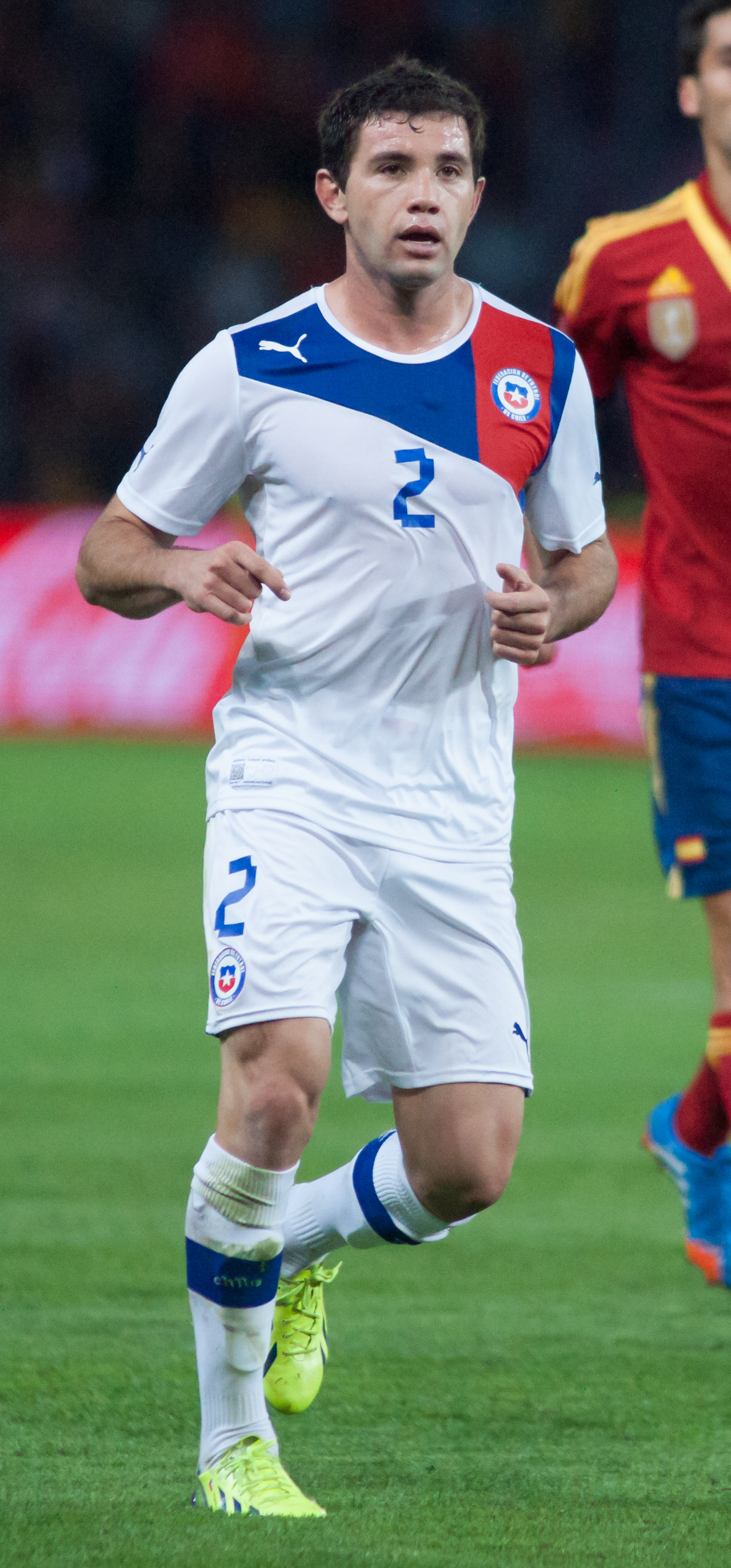
- Mena playing for Chile in 2013

Personal information
- Full name: Eugenio Esteban Mena Reveco
- Date of birth: 18 July 1988 (age 38)
- Place of birth: Viña del Mar, Chile
- Height: 1.75 m (5 ft 9 in)
- Position: Left-back

Team information
- Current team: Universidad Católica
- Number: 3

Youth career
- Santiago Wanderers

Senior career*
Years	Team	Apps	(Gls)
2008–2010	Santiago Wanderers	91	(1)
2010–2013	Universidad de Chile	88	(7)
2013–2015	Santos	35	(0)
2015–2017	Cruzeiro	6	(0)
2016	→ São Paulo (loan)	20	(0)
2017	→ Sport Recife (loan)	23	(1)
2018	Bahia	5	(1)
2018–2022	Racing Club	96	(1)
2023–	Universidad Católica	59	(2)

International career^{‡}
2009–2010	Chile U23	10	(1)
2010–2024	Chile	73	(3)
Medal record
Representing Chile
Winner	Copa América	2015
Winner	Copa América Centenario	2016
Runner-up	FIFA Confederations Cup	2017
- * Club domestic league appearances and goals as of 23:15, 20 June 2025 (UTC) ‡ National team caps and goals as of 11:52, 30 July 2026 (UTC)

Eugenio Esteban Mena Reveco (Spanish pronunciation: [ewˈxenjo ˈmena]; born 18 July 1988) is a Chilean professional footballer who plays as a left-back for Chilean Primera División side Club Deportivo Universidad Católica and the Chile national team.

== Club career ==
Mena finished his formation in Santiago Wanderers' academy, and made his senior debuts in 2008 Chilean Primera División B. He scored his first professional goal on 11 October 2009, against San Marcos de Arica.

In July 2010, Mena signed with Club Universidad de Chile, for a $500,000 fee for the half of his rights. In his first season, Mena failed to break into a settled squad, appearing rarely. However, after the arrival of Jorge Sampaoli in 2011, Mena was converted into an important player of the La U squad. At the end of the season, he was a part of the squad which won Copa Sudamericana and Chilean Primera División.

On 3 July 2013, Mena signed a one-year loan deal with Brazilian Série A outfit Santos FC, with a buyout clause. He quickly established himself as a starter, and on 5 June of the following year Peixe bought the remaining rights of the player.

On 14 January 2015, Mena rescinded his contract Santos, after winning a court case due to unpaid wages. Ten days later he agreed a deal with fellow league team Cruzeiro.

On 9 July 2018, he joined Racing Club de Avellaneda.

On 9 December 2022, Mena returned to Chile, joining Universidad Católica, on a two-year contract.

== International career ==
Mena represented Chile national football team U-23 on 2009 Toulon Tournament that finished first, and 2010 Toulon Tournament that finished fourth.

On 7 September 2010, he made his debut with the full squad, in a 1–2 defeat against Ukraine. On 21 March 2012, he scored his first goal for La Roja, in a 3–1 win against Peru.

Mena was also one of the 23-men selected by manager Jorge Sampaoli for the 2014 FIFA World Cup. He appeared in four matches during the tournament, all as a starter.

== Career statistics ==
=== Club ===
As of As of match played 21 June 2026

Appearances and goals by club, season and competition
Club	Season	League			Cup		League State league (Note: Including State Leagues, Copa do Nordeste and Copa de la Liga)		Continental		Other		Total	
Club	Season	Division	Apps	Goals	Apps	Goals	Apps	Goals	Apps	Goals	Apps	Goals	Apps	Goals
Santiago Wanderers	2008	Primera División	38	0	2	0	—		—		—		40	0
Santiago Wanderers	2009	Primera División	37	1	3	0	—		—		—		40	1
Santiago Wanderers	2010	Primera División	16	0	1	0	—		—		—		17	0
Santiago Wanderers	Total		91	1	6	0	—		—		—		97	1
Universidad de Chile	2010	Primera División	7	0	0	0	—		2 (Note: Appearances Copa Sudamericana)	0	—		9	0
Universidad de Chile	2011	Primera División	40	4	6	0	—		11	0	—		57	4
Universidad de Chile	2012	Primera División	29	3	0	0	—		15 (Note: 12 appearances, one goal in Copa Libertadores; three appearances in Copa Sudamericana)	1	3	0	37	4
Universidad de Chile	2013	Primera División	12	0	6	0	—		2 (Note: Appearances in Copa Libertadores)	0	—		20	0
Universidad de Chile	Total		88	7	12	0	—		30	1	3	0	133	8
Santos	2013	Série A	20	0	3	0	—		—		—		23	0
Santos	2014	Série A	15	0	—		—		—		—		38	0
Santos	Total		35	0	12	0	14	0	—		—		61	0
Cruzeiro	2015	Série A	6	0	2	0	8	0	10	0	—		26	0
São Paulo (loan)	2016	Série A	20	0	1	0	10	0	14	0	—		45	0
Sport Recife (loan)	2017	Série A	23	1	6	0	8 (Note: Four appearances in Copa do Nordeste and four appearances in Campeonato Pernambucano.)	0	8	0	—		45	1
Bahia	2018	Série A	5	1	2	0	13 (Note: Eight appearances in Copa do Nordeste and five appearances in Campeonato Baiano.)	0	3	0	—		13	0
Racing Club	2018–19	Superliga	19	0	—		—		—		1	0	20	0
Racing Club	2019–20	Superliga	16	0	—		—		—		2 (Note: One appearance in Copa de la Superliga and one appearance in Trofeo de Campeones de la Liga Profesional)	0	18	0
Racing Club	2020–21	Primera División	6	0	—		—		10	0	—		16	0
Racing Club	2021	Primera División	27	0	3	0	—		8	0	—		38	0
Racing Club	2022	Primera División	28	1	1	0	—		6	0	—		35	1
Racing Club	Total		96	1	4	0	—		24	0	3	0	127	1
Universidad Católica	2023	Primera División	21	1	4	0	—		1	0	—		26	1
Universidad Católica	2024	Primera División	28	0	3	0	—		1	0	—		32	0
Universidad Católica	2025	Primera División	22	1	4	0	—		0	0	—		26	1
Universidad Católica	2026	Primera División	9	0	0	0	3	0	6	0	2 (Note: Appearance(s) in the Supercopa de Chile)	0	20	0
Universidad Católica	Total		80	2	11	0	3	0	8	0	2	0	104	2
Career total			459	13	56	0	56	0	97	1	8	0	676	14

=== International ===
As of match played on 5 September 2024

Appearances and goals by national team and year
National team	Year	Apps	Goals
Chile	2010	1	0
Chile	2011	1	0
Chile	2012	7	2
Chile	2013	14	1
Chile	2014	10	0
Chile	2015	9	0
Chile	2016	8	0
Chile	2017	3	0
Chile	2018	2	0
Chile	2019	1	0
Chile	2021	11	0
Chile	2022	4	0
Chile	2023	1	0
Chile	2024	1	0
Total		73	3

Scores and results list Chile's goal tally first, score column indicates score after each Mena goal.

List of international goals scored by Eugenio Mena
No.	Date	Venue	Opponent	Score	Result	Competition
1	21 March 2012	Estadio Carlos Dittborn, Arica, Chile	Peru	3–1	3–1	Copa del Pacífico
2	11 April 2012	Estadio Jorge Basadre, Tacna, Peru	Peru	1–0	3–0	Copa del Pacífico
3	14 August 2013	Brøndby Stadium, Brøndby, Denmark	Iraq	1–0	6–0	Friendly

== Honours ==
Universidad de Chile

- Primera División de Chile: 2011–A, 2011–C, 2012–A
- Copa Sudamericana: 2011
- Copa Chile: 2012–13

Racing

- Superliga Argentina: 2018–19
- Trofeo de Campeones de la Superliga Argentina: 2019
- Trofeo de Campeones de la Liga Profesional: 2022

Chile

- Copa América: 2015
- Copa América Centenario: 2016
- FIFA Confederations Cup: Runner-up 2017

Individual

- Valparaíso UNESCO Medal, World Heritage: 2009
- South American team of year: 2012
- Chilean league team of year: 2012
- Best full back of SIFUP: 2012
- IFFHS Team of the Copa América: 2021
