= Santiago Rosales =

Argentine footballer

Personal information
- Full name: Santiago José Rosales
- Date of birth: 22 March 1995 (age 31)
- Place of birth: Mar del Plata, Argentina
- Height: 1.80 m (5 ft 11 in)
- Position: Winger

Team information
- Current team: Mitre

Youth career
- Aldosivi

Senior career*
Years	Team	Apps	(Gls)
2014–2016	Aldosivi	34	(4)
2016–2022	Racing Club	19	(2)
2018	→ Olimpia (loan)	6	(1)
2018–2019	→ Gimnasia (loan)	6	(0)
2019–2020	→ Patronato (loan)	9	(0)
2020–2021	→ Central Córdoba (loan)	15	(2)
2021–2022	→ Mitre (loan)	39	(11)
2023–2024	Mitre	30	(8)
2024	PAS Giannina	7	(0)
2025–	Mitre	42	(10)
- * Club domestic league appearances and goals as of 17:31, 2 May 2026 (UTC)

Santiago José Rosales (born 22 March 1995) is an Argentine professional footballer who plays as a winger for Mitre.
