= Cristian Marcial =

Argentine footballer

Personal information
- Full name: Cristian Alejandro Marcial
- Date of birth: 10 January 1996 (age 30)
- Place of birth: Quilmes, Argentina
- Height: 1.79 m (5 ft 10 in)
- Position: Right-back

Team information
- Current team: All Boys (on loan from Racing Club)

Youth career
- Racing Club

Senior career*
| Years | Team | Apps | (Gls) |
| 2018– | Racing Club | 0 | (0) |
| 2018–2019 | → Fénix (loan) | 18 | (1) |
| 2019–2021 | → Platense (loan) | 11 | (0) |
| 2022– | → All Boys (loan) | 10 | (0) |
- * Club domestic league appearances and goals as of 19:11, 18 April 2022 (UTC)

Cristian Alejandro Marcial (born 10 January 1996) is an Argentine professional footballer who plays as a right-back for All Boys, on loan from Racing Club.

== Career ==
Marcial began his career with Racing Club. In August 2018, Primera B Metropolitana side Fénix completed the loan signing of Marcial. He was substituted on for his professional debut on 10 September versus Almirante Brown, prior to starting for the first time a week later during a victory away to Defensores Unidos. His first goal arrived in November against Deportivo Riestra. Marcial spent 2019–20 out on loan again, this time in Primera B Nacional with Platense. He appeared five times before returning to Racing on 30 June 2020. The loan at Platense ended at the end of 2021. In February 2022, he was loaned out once again, this time to All Boys until the end of 2022.

== Career statistics ==
As of 1 January 2023.

Club statistics
| Club | Division | League | | | Cup | | Continental | | Total | |
| Club | Division | Season | Apps | Goals | Apps | Goals | Apps | Goals | Apps | Goals |
|---|---|---|---|---|---|---|---|---|---|---|
| Fénix | Primera B Metropolitana | 2018-19 | 18 | 1 | — | | — | | 18 | 1 |
| Platense | Primera B Nacional | 2019-20 | 5 | 0 | — | | — | | 5 | 0 |
| Platense | Primera B Nacional | 2020 | 1 | 0 | — | | — | | 1 | 0 |
| Platense | Primera División | 2021 | 2 | 0 | 3 | 0 | — | | 5 | 0 |
| Platense | Total | | 8 | 0 | 3 | 0 | — | | 11 | 0 |
| All Boys | Primera B Nacional | 2022 | 20 | 0 | — | | — | | 20 | 0 |
| Career total | | | 46 | 1 | 3 | 0 | — | | 49 | 1 |
