= Braian Guille =

Argentine footballer

Personal information
- Full name: Braian Alejandro Guille
- Date of birth: 31 July 1997 (age 29)
- Place of birth: Olavarría, Argentina
- Height: 1.70 m (5 ft 7 in)
- Position: Forward

Team information
- Current team: Olimpo

Youth career
- Atlético Rivadavia
- Racing Club

Senior career*
Years	Team	Apps	(Gls)
2017–2021	Racing Club	1	(0)
2017–2018	→ Santamarina (loan)	19	(2)
2018–2019	→ Brown de Adrogué (loan)	9	(1)
2019	→ Defensores (loan)	2	(0)
2019–2021	→ Olimpo (loan)	24	(4)
2021–	Olimpo	61	(22)
2023	→ Atlético Tucumán (loan)	16	(0)
2023–2024	→ Colón (loan)	31	(5)
2025	→ Deportivo Riestra (loan)	7	(1)
- * Club domestic league appearances and goals as of 17:51, 16 December 2025 (UTC)

Braian Alejandro Guille (born 31 July 1997) is an Argentine professional footballer who plays as a forward for Olimpo.

== Career ==
=== Club ===
Guille had a period of his youth career with Atlético Rivadavia before joining Racing Club. He first appeared in the Racing Club senior squad in March and April 2017, being an unused substitute for leagues matches against Godoy Cruz and Temperley. In the following May, he made his professional debut in an Argentine Primera División defeat away to Independiente. On 23 August 2017, Santamarina of Primera B Nacional loaned Guille. He scored in his first Santamarina appearance, netting in a loss to Aldosivi. One goal in eighteen further fixtures followed. Guille joined Brown on loan in June 2018.

On 10 January 2019, having terminated his loan with Brown days prior, Guille was loaned to Defensores de Belgrano.

=== International ===
He was selected by Argentina at U20 level for the 2016 COTIF Tournament, but he didn't make an appearance.

== Career statistics ==
As of 4 February 2019.

Club statistics
Club	Season	League			Cup		Continental		Other		Total	
Club	Season	Division	Apps	Goals	Apps	Goals	Apps	Goals	Apps	Goals	Apps	Goals
Racing Club	2016–17	Primera División	1	0	0	0	0	0	0	0	1	0
Racing Club	2017–18	Primera División	0	0	0	0	0	0	0	0	0	0
Racing Club	2018–19	Primera División	0	0	0	0	0	0	0	0	0	0
Racing Club	Total		1	0	0	0	0	0	0	0	1	0
Santamarina (loan)	2017–18	Primera B Nacional	19	2	0	0	—		0	0	19	2
Brown (loan)	2018–19	Primera B Nacional	9	1	3	0	—		0	0	12	1
Defensores de Belgrano (loan)	2018–19	Primera B Nacional	0	0	0	0	—		0	0	0	0
Career total			29	3	3	0	0	0	0	0	32	3
