= Nery Domínguez =

Argentine footballer (born 1990)

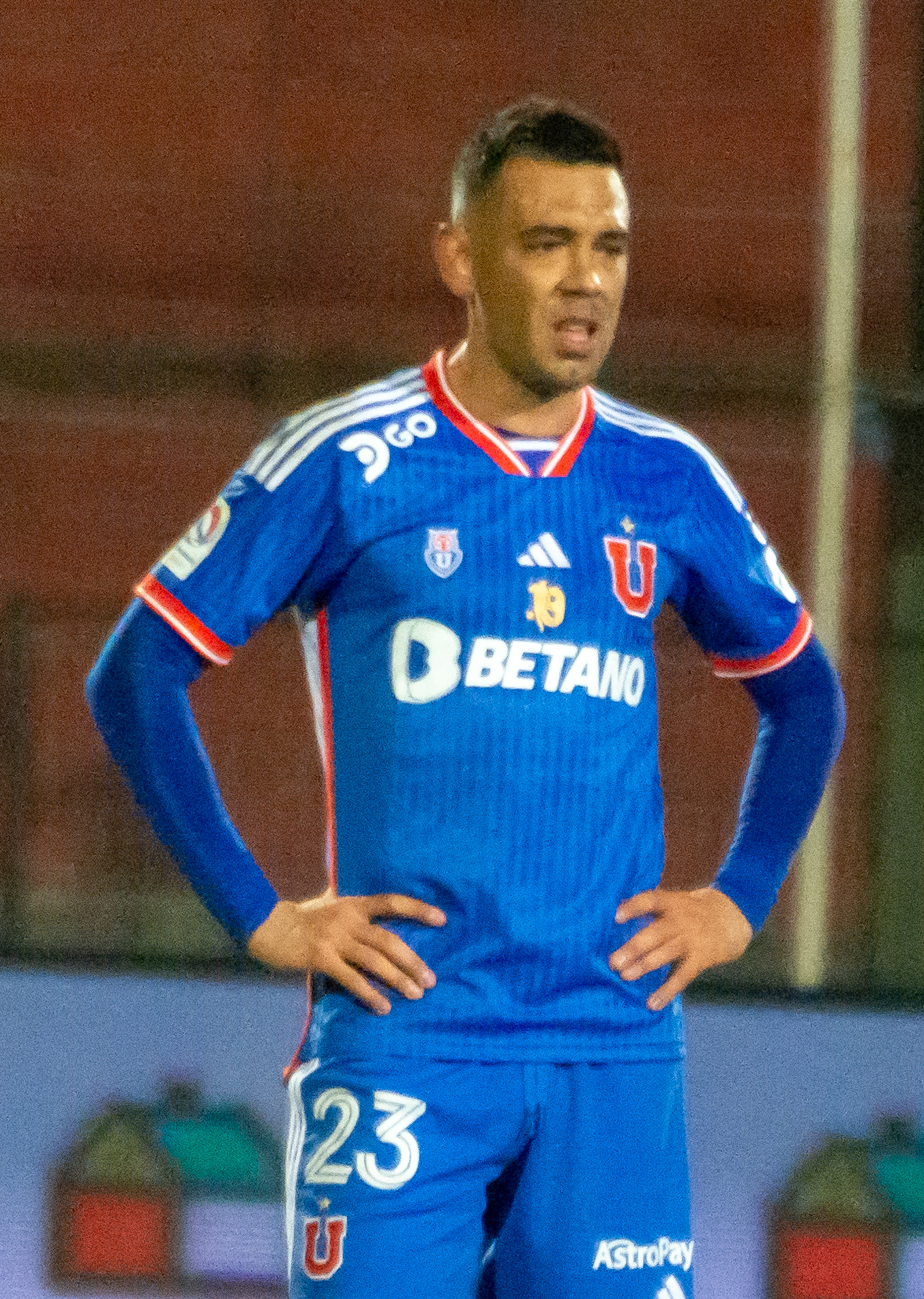

Personal information
- Full name: Nery Andrés Domínguez
- Date of birth: 9 April 1990 (age 36)
- Place of birth: Cañada de Gómez, Argentina
- Height: 1.84 m (6 ft 0 in)
- Positions: Defender; central midfielder

Team information
- Current team: Central Córdoba Rosario

Youth career
- Defensores de América
- Santa Teresita
- 2007–2012: Rosario Central

Senior career*
Years	Team	Apps	(Gls)
2012–2016	Rosario Central	103	(7)
2016–2018	Querétaro	17	(1)
2017	→ Independiente (loan)	17	(1)
2018	→ Racing Club (loan)	24	(0)
2019–2022	Racing Club	73	(3)
2022–2024	Universidad de Chile	32	(0)
2024–2025	Lanús	22	(0)
2025–2026	San Lorenzo	15	(0)
2026–	Central Córdoba Rosario	0	(0)
- * Club domestic league appearances and goals as of 18:22, 17 March 2026 (UTC)

Nery Andrés Domínguez (born 9 April 1990) is an Argentine footballer who plays as a defender. He plays for Primera C Metropolitana side Central Córdoba Rosario.

== Career ==
After being loaned during 2018 from Querétaro, Domínguez permanently joined Racing Club since 2019.

On 1 July 2022, Domínguez joined Chilean Primera División side Universidad de Chile on a deal for 18 months.

== Honours ==
Rosario Central

- Primera B Nacional (1): 2012–13

Querétaro

- Copa MX (1): Apertura 2016

Independiente

- Copa Sudamericana (1): 2017

Racing Club

- Argentine Primera División (1): 2018–19
- Trofeo de Campeones (1): 2019
