= Alexis Soto =

Argentine footballer

Personal information
- Full name: Alexis Nahuel Soto
- Date of birth: 20 October 1993 (age 33)
- Place of birth: Avellaneda, Argentina
- Height: 1.87 m (6 ft 2 in)
- Position: Left-back

Team information
- Current team: Rosario Central (on loan from Defensa y Justicia)
- Number: 33

Youth career
- Dock Sud

Senior career*
Years	Team	Apps	(Gls)
2012–2015	Dock Sud	53	(1)
2015–2017	Banfield	42	(0)
2017–2023	Racing Club	43	(0)
2021–2022	→ Defensa y Justicia (loan)	62	(0)
2023–	Defensa y Justicia	97	(0)
2026–	→ Rosario Central (loan)	16	(1)

International career
2016	Argentina Olympic	3	(0)
- * Club domestic league appearances and goals as of 17:15, 10 July 2026 (UTC)

Alexis Nahuel Soto (born 20 October 1993) is an Argentine professional footballer who plays as a left-back for Argentine Primera División side Rosario Central, on loan from Defensa y Justicia.

== Career ==
=== Club ===
Soto began his career with Primera C team Dock Sud in 2012, he remained there until 2015 when he joined Argentine Primera División side Banfield. He made his league debut for Banfield on 8 November against Olimpo.

=== International ===
Soto represented Argentina at the 2016 Summer Olympics in Brazil.

== Honours ==
Rosario Central

- Supercopa Internacional: 2026
