= Eduardo Coudet =

Argentine footballer and manager

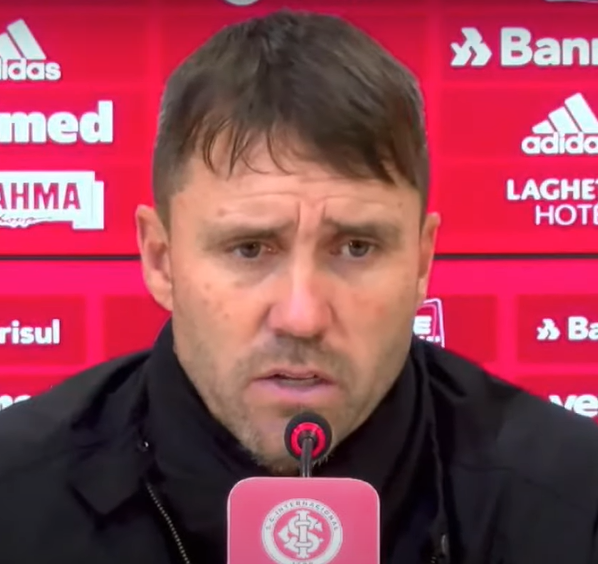
- Coudet as manager of Internacional in 2020

Personal information
- Full name: Eduardo Germán Coudet
- Date of birth: 12 September 1974 (age 52)
- Place of birth: Buenos Aires, Argentina
- Height: 1.78 m (5 ft 10 in)
- Position: Right midfielder

Youth career
- Platense

Senior career*
Years	Team	Apps	(Gls)
1993–1995	Platense	56	(2)
1995–1998	Rosario Central	102	(23)
1998–1999	San Lorenzo	30	(5)
1999–2004	River Plate	103	(26)
2002–2003	→ Celta Vigo (loan)	9	(0)
2004–2007	Rosario Central	41	(2)
2005–2006	→ San Lorenzo (loan)	23	(2)
2007–2010	San Luis	89	(10)
2008–2009	→ Necaxa (loan)	16	(1)
2010	→ Colón (loan)	5	(1)
2010–2011	Philadelphia Union	9	(0)
2011	Fort Lauderdale Strikers	18	(6)
Total		501	(78)

Managerial career
- 2014–2016: Rosario Central
- 2017: Tijuana
- 2018–2019: Racing Club
- 2020: Internacional
- 2020–2022: Celta Vigo
- 2023: Atlético Mineiro
- 2023–2024: Internacional
- 2024–2026: Alavés
- 2026: River Plate
- * Club domestic league appearances and goals

Eduardo Germán Coudet (born 12 September 1974), nicknamed El Chacho, is an Argentine professional football manager and former player.

Over the course of his 18-year career as a professional footballer, Coudet represented ten different clubs across four countries. His legacy is most closely associated with Rosario Central and River Plate, where he won five league titles.

Having begun managing with Rosario, he won the 2018–19 Argentine Primera División for Racing Club. He also worked in the top leagues of Mexico, Brazil, and Spain, winning the Campeonato Mineiro for Atlético Mineiro in 2023.

== Playing career ==
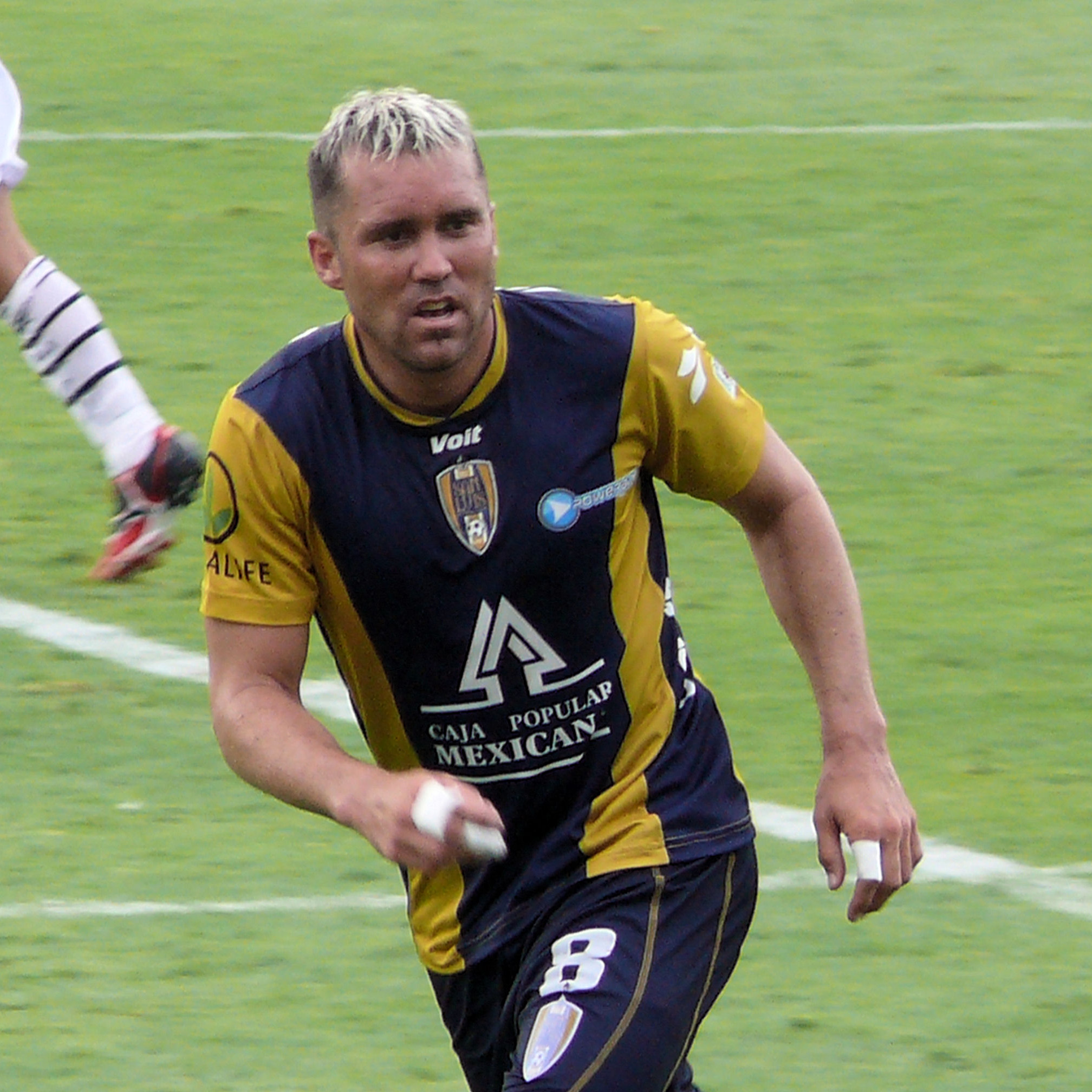
Coudet playing for San Luis in 2009

Born in Buenos Aires, Coudet spent most of his career in the Argentine Primera División with Rosario Central. From 1993 to 1995, he played for Platense, alongside David Trezeguet. He won three Argentine titles during his time with River Plate.

In 2002, during the Argentine Great Depression, Coudet was one of many players to move abroad, joining Celta Vigo in Spain's La Liga. He said of life in his home country: "I can't live any more over here. It's terrible to experience every day with this sense of unease. You brake at a light and you don't know if they're going to wash your windscreen, ask for an autograph or stick a bullet through your head", and had chosen a cheaper car to avoid bringing attention to his wealth.

After several years playing in Mexico, Coudet returned to Argentina in January 2010 to play for Colón.

Coudet eventually became a trialist for the Philadelphia Union of Major League Soccer and later signed with the club in July 2010. He was released by the club in February 2011. On 28 March 2011, Coudet signed with Fort Lauderdale Strikers of the North American Soccer League. Coudet was given a six-match ban after aggressively confronting the referee in a match against the Puerto Rico Islanders on 21 July.

== Coaching career ==
=== Rosario Central ===
On 12 December 2014, Coudet was named as the new head coach of Rosario Central, replacing Miguel Ángel Russo. As his assistant, he selected former Argentina international Ariel Garcé, who had a previous brief stint with Central. Aiming to reinforce his squad, Coudet contacted various ex-Central players, including Marco Ruben, Cristian Villagra (both playing in Ukraine at the time) and César Delgado, convincing them to join for the 2015 season. Among others, Coudet also managed to sign defender Pablo Álvarez, midfielders José Luis Fernández, and Gustavo Colman.

Coudet's debut was a surprise 1–0 win away to reigning champions Racing Club, followed with four consecutive victories. Coudet's side had a 13-game undefeated streak until an eventual 2–0 loss away to River Plate. Central bounced back quickly, inflicting on rivals Newell's an unprecedented fourth consecutive derby loss. Coudet's team finished 2015 in third place, and narrowly missed out on the 2014–15 Copa Argentina Championship after a controversial 2–0 final loss to Boca Juniors, after a dubious penalty decision and an offside goal put the tie beyond reach.

=== Club Tijuana ===
On 12 June 2017, Coudet was announced as the new manager of Liga MX side Club Tijuana, having signed a one-year contract with the club. Just 4 months and 18 days later, he was dismissed. His team at the Xolos contained nine compatriots.

=== Racing Club ===
On 17 December 2017, Coudet was announced as the new manager at Racing Club, succeeding Diego Cocca and aligning with new director of football Diego Milito.

After missing out on Copa Libertadores qualification in 2017–18, Racing won the league in 2018–19, their first in five years. Coudet's team were the highest scorers over the 24 games (42) and conceded the fewest goals (15).

=== Internacional ===
On 16 December 2019, Coudet was appointed manager at Brazilian Série A side Internacional, after agreeing to a two-year contract. His first game in charge was a 1–0 win at Juventude, the first game of the Campeonato Gaúcho, and finished the state league season as runners-up to Grenal rivals Grêmio.

Coudet quit the club on 9 November 2020, due to an approach by Celta Vigo in Spain's La Liga. He left the club in the lead in the domestic league after 20 games, as well as being in the last 16 of the Copa Libertadores and the quarter-finals of the Copa do Brasil, having won 24 and lost 9 of his 46 fixtures.

=== Celta ===
On 12 November 2020, Coudet was named in charge of Celta, signing an 18-month deal with the club where he had previously been a player. He won his first five in command, with the most goals and fewest conceded of any league manager at that time, markedly better than his predecessor Óscar García. At the end of the season, he signed a new contract until June 2024, including the Galician club's centenary.

In January 2021 and 2022, Coudet's team were eliminated from the Copa del Rey by third-tier opposition away in the Balearic Islands, namely Ibiza and Atlético Baleares. On 2 November 2022, he was sacked for the first time in his managerial career, having lost the confidence of club president Carlos Mouriño; he was succeeded by Carlos Carvalhal.

=== Atlético Mineiro ===
On 19 November 2022, Coudet returned to Brazil and signed for Atlético Mineiro ahead of the 2023 season, on a two-year deal. In April 2023, he won the Campeonato Mineiro with an aggregate 5–2 win over rivals América in the finals. His resignation was announced on 11 June, having won 21 and lost 8 of his 35 games, with the team nearing the last 16 of the Copa Libertadores.

=== Internacional return ===
On 19 July 2023, Coudet was announced back at Internacional, replacing sacked Mano Menezes for the rest of the year. He arrived accompanied by assistant manager Lucho González. Four days later, he managed the club to a goalless draw away to Red Bull Bragantino, and took five matches to record his first win as Internacional knocked out River Plate on penalties following a 2–1 victory in regular time at Beira-Rio to lead the team into the Copa Libertadores quarterfinals. He proceeded to lead the team to the semifinals, where they got knocked out by eventual winners Fluminense in a 1–2 defeat in Porto Alegre. The club finished the league season in 9th, and Coudet's contract was extended for another year.

In 2024, Inter were eliminated from the semi-finals of the state league, losing on penalties to Juventude in March. On 10 July, having lost at home to the same team in the third round of the Copa do Brasil, he was sacked.

=== Alavés ===
On 2 December 2024, Coudet returned to Spain after taking over Alavés also in the top tier. He arrived after the dismissal of Luis García, with the club one point above the relegation zone. On his debut three days later, the team were knocked out of the Copa del Rey on penalties after a 2–2 draw away to Minera, a team from the fourth-tier Segunda Federación based in Llano del Beal, a village with 1,300 inhabitants. On 3 March 2026, Coudet left the club by mutual consent.

=== River Plate ===
On 4 March 2026, River Plate announced Coudet as their new head coach. On 27 August, he stepped down from his role following the team’s elimination from the Copa Sudamericana.

== Managerial statistics ==
As of match played 26 August 2026

Managerial record by team and tenure
Team	Nat	From	To	Record								Ref
Team	Nat	From	To	G	W	D	L	GF	GA	GD	Win %	Ref
Rosario Central	(Argentina)	12 December 2014	16 December 2016	81	37	26	18	118	78	+40	45.68	
Tijuana	(Mexico)	12 June 2017	30 October 2017	15	5	3	7	19	23	−4	33.33	
Racing Club	(Argentina)	17 December 2017	16 December 2019	73	37	24	12	112	67	+45	50.68	
Internacional	(Brazil)	16 December 2019	9 November 2020	46	24	13	9	71	37	+34	52.17	
Celta Vigo	(Spain)	12 November 2020	2 November 2022	84	31	19	34	120	117	+3	36.90	
Atlético Mineiro	(Brazil)	19 November 2022	11 June 2023	35	21	6	8	53	27	+26	60.00	
Internacional	(Brazil)	19 July 2023	10 July 2024	62	30	15	17	85	58	+27	48.39	
Alavés	(Spain)	2 December 2024	3 March 2026	55	17	17	21	62	62	+0	30.91	
River Plate	(Argentina)	4 March 2026	27 August 2026	27	13	6	8	36	22	+14	48.15	
Total				484	216	136	132	676	491	+185	44.63	—

== Honours ==
=== Player ===
River Plate

- Primera División: 1999 Apertura, 2000 Clausura, 2002 Clausura, 2003 Clausura, 2004 Clausura

Rosario Central

- Copa CONMEBOL: 1995

=== Manager ===
Racing Club

- Primera División: 2018–19
- Trofeo de Campeones: 2019

Atlético Mineiro

- Campeonato Mineiro: 2023
