= Estadio Monumental Presidente Perón =

Stadium in Córdoba, Argentina

Coordinates: 31°23′1″S 64°10′49″W

Monumental President Perón Stadium
- Estadio Monumental Presidente Perón
- Monumental de Alta Córdoba

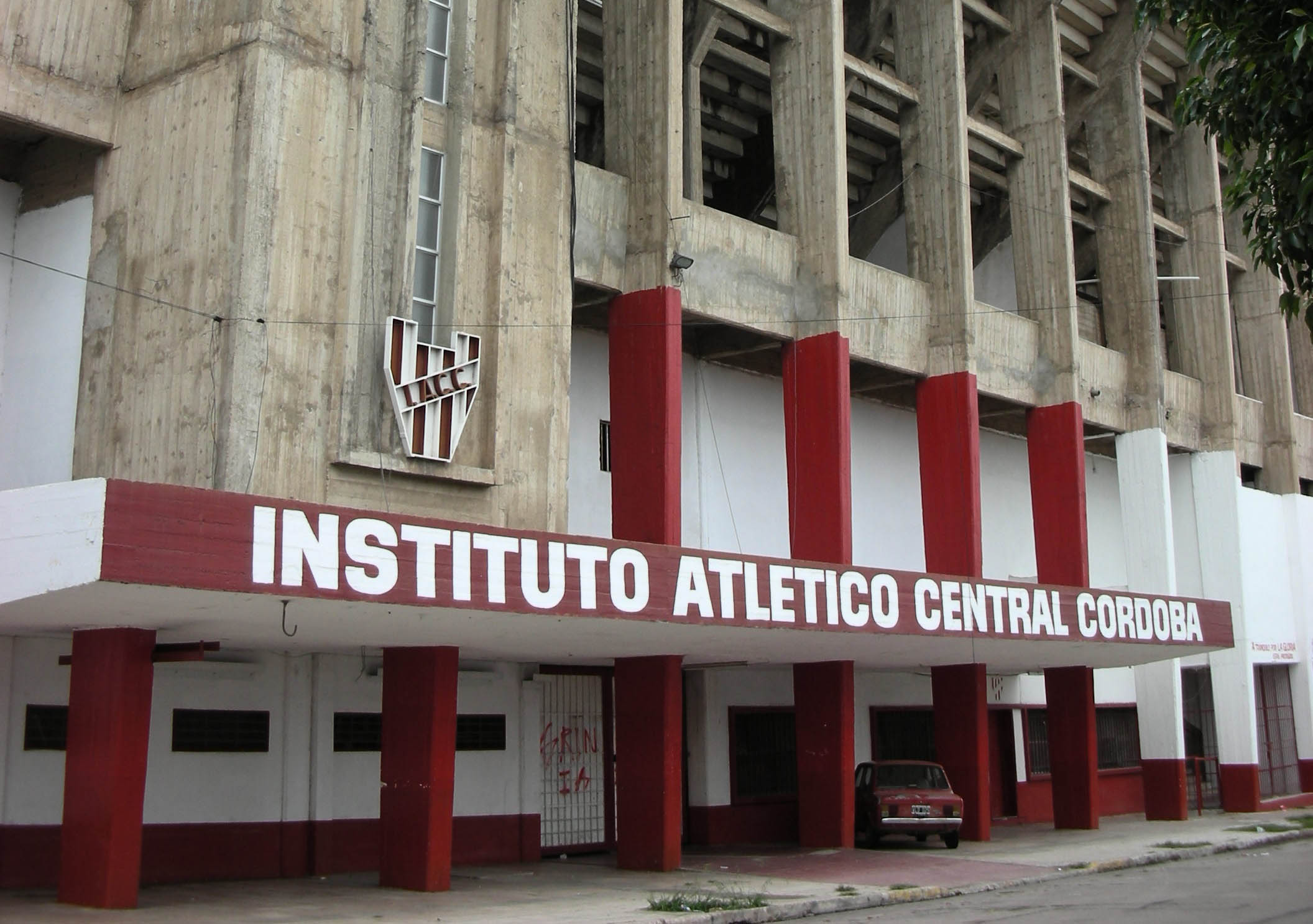
- The stadium in 2007
- Interactive map of Monumental President Perón Stadium
- Full name: Estadio Monumental Presidente Perón
- Former names: Estadio Juan Domingo Perón (1951–2024)
- Location: 2750 Jujuy Street, Alta Córdoba, Córdoba, Argentina
- Owner: Instituto A.C.C.
- Capacity: 26,000
- Surface: Grass

Construction
- Built: 1948–1951
- Opened: 15 August 1951; 75 years ago
- Renovated: 1960, 1981, 1995

Tenant
- Instituto (1951–present)

Website
- institutoacc.com.ar/instalaciones

Estadio Monumental Presidente Perón ('President Perón Monumental Stadium') is an association football stadium in Córdoba, Argentina. It is owned and operated by local club Instituto Atlético Central Córdoba.

It is named after the former Argentine president Juan Perón who loaned the club $1.5 million during the late 1940s to help build the stadium. The debt was then written off by Arturo Frondizi in 1959.

== History ==
In 1946, under the presidency of General Juan Perón, the National Congress promulgated Law No. 12,931 in which article 23 authorized the National Executive power to dispose of the sum of $20,000,000 to grant subsidies for the construction of stadiums for social and sports clubs throughout the country.

In Córdoba, Instituto was the only institution that requested to take advantage of the benefits of that provision, as had previously been done by clubs Racing and Huracán of Buenos Aires. By court file No. 10.781/47, the club requested a loan of $1,500,000. The club member Mr. Hernán Yofré collaborated with the management of this loan. The loan was granted by Decree No. 5,018 of February 20, 1948 for the sum of $1,500,000. The repayment terms of the loan were 52 years, through the payment of quarterly installments of $14,265 each, equal and consecutive.

There was a two-year franchise in which only interest amortization was paid and these were calculated at a rate of 3% per year. If the agreement is fulfilled, the payment of the loan would only have been completed in the year 2000. The architects Morchio and Souberan had built a model of the Stadium and drawn up their plans.

Construction of the stadium began in March 1948, but delays and serious problems for the construction company, plus the effects of inflation, meant that the money received could only build the current high tribune on Jujuy street. Fortunately, the debt of that loan was canceled on October 9, 1959 (41 years before the expected payment term), through Decree Law No. 14,880 of President Guido.

Finally, on 15 August 1951 and as part of the celebrations for the 33 years of the club's life, with a friendly match vs Racing Club, the stadium was inaugurated. In 1957, the stadium was added a lighting system, which was first used in a match vs Vélez Sarsfield.

In 2008, the stadium was remodeled, with the inclusion of modern broadcasting booths and VIP boxes. In May 2022, it was announced that the entire lighting system would be replaced by LED devices at an estimated cost of AR$44 million, and a Wi-Fi system will be installed to provide Internet service.

== See also ==
- List of football stadiums in Argentina
- Lists of stadiums
