= David Barbona =

Argentine footballer

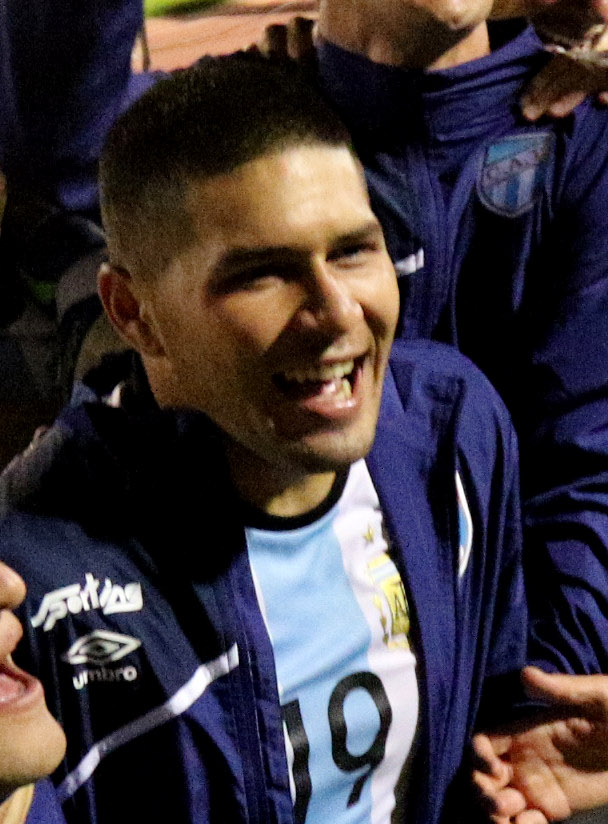
- Barbona in 2017

Personal information
- Full name: David Matías Barbona
- Date of birth: 22 February 1995 (age 31)
- Place of birth: Buenos Aires, Argentina
- Height: 1.79 m (5 ft 10 1/2 in)
- Position: Midfielder

Team information
- Current team: Defensa y Justicia
- Number: 19

Youth career
- Nueva Chicago

Senior career*
Years	Team	Apps	(Gls)
2012–2014	Nueva Chicago	46	(5)
2015–2017	Estudiantes	25	(1)
2016–2017	→ Atlético Tucumán (loan)	21	(4)
2017–2019	Atlético Tucumán	46	(4)
2019–2020	Racing Club	14	(0)
2020–2024	Tijuana	48	(1)
2022	→ Querétaro (loan)	10	(0)
2023	→ Defensa y Justicia (loan)	30	(3)
2024–	Defensa y Justicia	33	(1)
- * Club domestic league appearances and goals as of 17:45, 10 May 2026 (UTC)

David Barbona (born 22 February 1995) is an Argentine footballer who plays as a midfielder for Defensa y Justicia.
