= Darío Cvitanich =

Argentine footballer (born 1984)

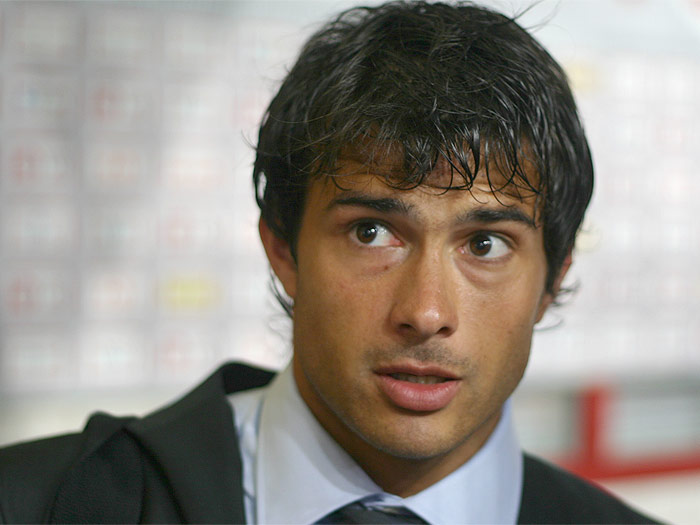

Personal information
- Full name: Darío Cvitanich
- Date of birth: 16 May 1984 (age 42)
- Place of birth: Baradero, Argentina
- Height: 1.77 m (5 ft 10 in)
- Position: Striker

Youth career
- Banfield

Senior career*
Years	Team	Apps	(Gls)
2003–2008	Banfield	92	(37)
2008–2012	Ajax	30	(14)
2010–2011	→ Pachuca (loan)	32	(14)
2011–2012	→ Boca Juniors (loan)	27	(9)
2012–2015	Nice	69	(30)
2015	Pachuca	14	(2)
2016	Miami FC	26	(9)
2017–2019	Banfield	47	(23)
2019–2021	Racing Club	56	(8)
2022	Banfield	6	(1)
Total		399	(147)
- * Club domestic league appearances and goals

Darío Cvitanich (Croatian: Dario Cvitanić; born 16 May 1984) is an Argentine retired professional footballer who played as a striker.

== Career ==
=== Banfield ===
Cvitanich started his career in Club Atlético Banfield's youth and made his debut for the club's first team at the age of 19 on 20 October 2003 in a 3–1 defeat to Olimpo de Bahía Blanca. He scored a hat-trick in a 4–0 win against Newell's Old Boys on 27 April 2007. He played, and scored, for Banfield in the Copa Libertadores 2007. He also served as a loyal member of Banfield during his early youth years in Argentina. Just prior to leaving his childhood side, he excelled his final loyalty by scoring 13 times during Banfield's run at the Clausura 2008 tournament.

=== Ajax ===
Cvitanich signed for Ajax, although he did not leave Banfield until the end of the 2008 season. He was labelled the successor to Klaas-Jan Huntelaar and scored his first goal against NAC Breda on 12 December 2008. Following the match against NAC, Cvitanich scored his first brace and his first hat-trick in subsequent weeks against De Graafschap and ADO Den Haag. He scored his first hat-trick of the 2009–10 season against NAC Breda.

=== Loan to Pachuca ===
Cvitanich joined Mexican side Pachuca on a year's loan on 1 January 2010. He helped the Mexican side to win their fourth CONCACAF Champions League title, and returned to Ajax on 3 November 2010, helping the club win their 30th Dutch league title.

=== Loan to Boca Juniors ===
Cvitanich signed with Boca Juniors in July 2011, on a one-year loan deal. He scored his first goal for Boca on 28 August 2011, against San Lorenzo de Almagro. Cvitanich scored again in the last games of the tournament against Godoy Cruz, two goals against Banfield and one against All Boys. He won the 2011 Argentine Torneo Apertura with Boca Juniors, as well as help the team to place in the final of the 2012 Copa Libertadores, where they faced Corinthians from Brazil. Cvitanich was also voted Copa Libertadores player of the week, in the 10th week of the tournament in April.

=== OGC Nice ===
On 25 July 2012, Cvitanich joined French Ligue 1 outfit OGC Nice on a three-year contract.

=== Return to Pachuca ===
On 5 January 2015, Cvitanich joined Mexican Liga MX club Pachuca.

After having a second knee injury and as a consequence missed the rest of the tournament, Pachuca agreed to release him from the team and hired Franco Jara as his replacement.

== Career statistics ==
As of 24 October 2011

Club performance			League		Cup		Continental		Total	
Season	Club	League	Apps	Goals	Apps	Goals	Apps	Goals	Apps	Goals
Argentina			League		Cup		South America		Total	
2002–03	Banfield	Primera División	0	0	-	-	-	-	0	0
2003–04	Banfield	Primera División	4	0	-	-	-	-	4	0
2004–05	Banfield	Primera División	12	3	-	-	-	-	12	3
2005–06	Banfield	Primera División	21	5	-	-	-	-	21	5
2006–07	Banfield	Primera División	25	10	-	-	-	-	25	10
2007–08	Banfield	Primera División	30	19	-	-	-	-	30	19
Netherlands			League		KNVB Cup		Europe		Total	
2008–09	AFC Ajax	Eredivisie	18	9	-	-	-	-	18	9
2009–10	AFC Ajax	Eredivisie	6	4	-	-	-	-	6	4
Mexico			League		Cup		North America		Total	
2009–10	Pachuca (loan)	Primera División	16	5	-	-	2	0	18	5
2010–11	Pachuca (loan)	Primera División	16	8	-	-	2	2	18	10
2014–15	Pachuca (loan)	Primera División	10	2	-	-	2	2	10	2
Netherlands			League		KNVB Cup		Europe		Total	
2010–11	AFC Ajax	Eredivisie	6	0	1	0	1	0	8	0
Argentina			League		Cup		South America		Total	
2011–12	Boca Juniors (loan)	Primera División	24	9	1	0	7	1	32	10
France			Ligue 1		Coupe de France		Europe		Total	
2012–13	Nice	Ligue 1	29	19	3	3	0	0	32	22
2013–14	Nice	Ligue 1	31	8	1	1	2	1	34	10
2014–15	Nice	Ligue 1	9	3	1	1	0	0	10	4
Total	Argentina		115	45	1	0	7	1	122	46
Total	Mexico		42	15	-	-	4	2	46	17
Total	Netherlands		30	13	1	0	1	0	32	13
Total	France		69	30	5	5	2	1	76	36
Career total			258	102	7	5	13	4	278	113

== International career ==
Cvitanich was born in Argentina with distant Croatian heritage. He established himself as a quality footballer in his home country playing for Banfield in the Argentine Primera División. After much consideration he eventually pledged to play for the Croatia national team, stating that "such an opportunity only comes once and you must take it." It became known on 14 January 2009 that he could not play for Croatia, because the FIFA rules do not allow nationality to be taken from great-grandparents.

La FIFA se opone a que el jugador del Ajax Amsterdam, de 24 años, vista la camiseta "ajedrezada", por considerar sus orígenes croatas como demasiado lejanos, señaló el secretario general de la HNS, Zorislav Srebric.

"La FIFA exige que como mínimo uno de los abuelos debe haber nacido en un país para que se conceda la ciudadanía futbolística", dijo el representante de la HNS.

«Seguiremos intentando persuadir a la FIFA para que haga una excepción, aunque no tenemos muchas esperanzas», adelantó Srebric.

FIFA opposes the 24-year-old Ajax Amsterdam player wearing the "checkered" shirt, considering his Croatian origins too distant, HNS-CFF Secretary General Zorislav Srebric said.

"FIFA requires that at least one of the grandparents must have been born in a country to grant a football citizenship," said the HNS-CFF representative.

"We will continue to try to persuade FIFA to make an exception, although we are not very hopeful," Srebric said.

In the case of the striker, only one of his great-grandparents was being born at the Croatian territories and later emigrated to Argentina.

Neither that nor his typical surname from Croatia will be able to help him against FIFA.

Cvitanich obtained the Croatian passport back in 2008, but that's not a sufficient argument for the FIFA.

== Personal life ==
Cvitanich obtained a Croatian passport in August 2008. He has dual citizenship, holding both Argentine and Croatian passports. The surname Cvitanić has his origin on the island of Brač. During the last century, every tenth citizen of the island was one of the family of the Cvitanić's.

== Honours ==
Pachuca

- CONCACAF Champions League: 2009–10

Ajax

- Eredivisie: 2010–11

Boca Juniors

- Primera División: 2011 Apertura
- Copa Argentina: 2012

Racing Club

- Primera División: 2018–19

Individual

- Argentine Primera División top scorer: 2008 Clausura
