= 2017 Copa Sudamericana first stage =

Football tournament matches

The 2017 Copa Sudamericana first stage was played from 28 February to 1 June 2017. A total of 44 teams competed in the first stage to decide the 22 of the 32 places in the second stage of the 2017 Copa Sudamericana.

== Draw ==
The draw for the first stage was held on 31 January 2017, 21:00 PYST (UTC−3), at the CONMEBOL Convention Centre in Luque, Paraguay. For the first stage, the teams were divided into two pots according to their geographical zones:

- Pot A (South Zone): 22 teams from Argentina, Bolivia, Chile, Paraguay, and Uruguay
- Pot B (North Zone): 22 teams from Brazil, Colombia, Ecuador, Peru, and Venezuela

The 44 teams were drawn into 22 ties (G1–G22) between a team from Pot A and a team from Pot B, with the teams from Pot B hosting the second leg in odd-numbered ties, and the teams from Pot A hosting the second leg in even-numbered ties. This distribution ensured that teams from the same association could not be drawn into the same tie.

First stage draw
Pot A (South Zone)	Pot B (North Zone)
(Argentina) Independiente; (Argentina) Arsenal; (Argentina) Defensa y Justicia; (Argentina) Huracán; (Argentina) Gimnasia y Esgrima; (Argentina) Racing; (Bolivia) Bolívar; (Bolivia) Oriente Petrolero; (Bolivia) Nacional Potosí; (Bolivia) Petrolero; (Chile) O'Higgins; (Chile) Palestino; Universidad de Chile; (Chile) Everton; (Paraguay) Cerro Porteño; (Paraguay) Sol de América; (Paraguay) Nacional; (Paraguay) Sportivo Luqueño; (Uruguay) Danubio; (Uruguay) Defensor Sporting; (Uruguay) Liverpool; (Uruguay) Boston River	(Brazil) Corinthians; (Brazil) Ponte Preta; (Brazil) São Paulo; (Brazil) Cruzeiro; (Brazil) Fluminense; (Brazil) Sport Recife; (Colombia) Deportes Tolima; (Colombia) Deportivo Cali; (Colombia) Patriotas; (Colombia) Rionegro Águilas; (Ecuador) LDU Quito; (Ecuador) Deportivo Cuenca; (Ecuador) Universidad Católica; (Ecuador) Fuerza Amarilla; (Peru) Alianza Lima; (Peru) Comerciantes Unidos; (Peru) Sport Huancayo; (Peru) Juan Aurich; (Venezuela) Estudiantes de Caracas; Atlético Venezuela; (Venezuela) Caracas; (Venezuela) Deportivo Anzoátegui

== Format ==
In the first stage, each tie was played on a home-and-away two-legged basis. If tied on aggregate, the away goals rule would be used. If still tied, extra time would not be played, and the penalty shoot-out would be used to determine the winner (Regulations Article 6.1).

The 22 winners of the first stage advanced to the second stage to join the 10 teams transferred from the Copa Libertadores (two best teams eliminated in the third stage of qualifying and eight third-placed teams in the group stage).

== Matches ==
The first legs were played on 28 February, 1–2 March, and 4–6 April, and the second legs were played on 9–11 May, 30–31 May and 1 June 2017.

Team 1	Agg.	Team 2	1st leg	2nd leg
Nacional Potosí (Bolivia)	4–3	(Peru) Sport Huancayo	3–1	1–2
Deportivo Cali (Colombia)	2–2 (a)	(Paraguay) Sportivo Luqueño	1–0	1–2
Petrolero (Bolivia)	1–6	(Ecuador) Universidad Católica	1–3	0–3
LDU Quito (Ecuador)	4–3	(Uruguay) Defensor Sporting	2–2	2–1
Everton (Chile)	1–1 (3–4 p)	(Colombia) Patriotas	1–0	0–1
Estudiantes de Caracas (Venezuela)	3–10	(Paraguay) Sol de América	2–3	1–7
Cerro Porteño (Paraguay)	3–2	(Venezuela) Caracas	1–1	2–1
Deportivo Anzoátegui (Venezuela)	3–4	(Argentina) Huracán	3–0	0–4
Oriente Petrolero (Bolivia)	2–2 (8–7 p)	(Ecuador) Deportivo Cuenca	1–1	1–1
Corinthians (Brazil)	4–1	Universidad de Chile	2–0	2–1
Independiente (Argentina)	1–0	(Peru) Alianza Lima	0–0	1–0
Ponte Preta (Brazil)	1–1 (a)	(Argentina) Gimnasia y Esgrima	0–0	1–1
Boston River (Uruguay)	4–2	(Peru) Comerciantes Unidos	3–1	1–1
Juan Aurich (Peru)	1–8	(Argentina) Arsenal	0–2	1–6
O'Higgins (Chile)	1–2	(Ecuador) Fuerza Amarilla	1–0	0–2
Deportes Tolima (Colombia)	2–2 (a)	(Bolivia) Bolívar	2–1	0–1
Palestino (Chile)	1–1 (7–6 p)	Atlético Venezuela	0–1	1–0
Sport Recife (Brazil)	3–3 (4–2 p)	(Uruguay) Danubio	3–0	0–3
Racing (Argentina)	2–1	(Colombia) Rionegro Águilas	1–0	1–1
Cruzeiro (Brazil)	3–3 (2–3 p)	(Paraguay) Nacional	2–1	1–2
Defensa y Justicia (Argentina)	1–1 (a)	(Brazil) São Paulo	0–0	1–1
Fluminense (Brazil)	2–1	(Uruguay) Liverpool	2–0	0–1

=== Match G1 ===
1 March 2017
18:15 UTC−4

Nacional Potosí (Bolivia)	3–1	(Peru) Sport Huancayo
Ruiz 45+1'; Paniagua 76'; Alessandrini 82'	Report	Corrales 9'

Estadio Víctor Agustín Ugarte, Potosí
Attendance: 1,000
Referee: Carlos Orbe (Ecuador)

9 May 2017
17:15 UTC−5

Sport Huancayo (Peru)	2–1	(Bolivia) Nacional Potosí
Montes 52' (pen.); Montiel 77'	Report	Sanguinetti 37' (pen.)

Estadio Huancayo, Huancayo
Attendance: 5,000
Referee: Juan Albarracín (Ecuador)

Nacional Potosí won 4–3 on aggregate and advanced to the second stage.

=== Match G2 ===
28 February 2017
19:45 UTC−5

Deportivo Cali (Colombia)	1–0	(Paraguay) Sportivo Luqueño
Benedetti 68'	Report

Estadio Deportivo Cali, Palmira
Attendance: 23,000
Referee: Fernando Rapallini (Argentina)

9 May 2017
20:45 UTC−4

Sportivo Luqueño (Paraguay)	2–1	(Colombia) Deportivo Cali
Di Vanni 6'; Escobar 12'	Report	Murillo 42' (pen.)

Estadio Feliciano Cáceres, Luque
Attendance: 3,000
Referee: Raphael Claus (Brazil)

Tied 2–2 on aggregate, Deportivo Cali won on away goals and advanced to the second stage.

=== Match G3 ===
4 April 2017
18:15 UTC−4

Petrolero (Bolivia)	1–3	(Ecuador) Universidad Católica
J. Flores 27'	Report	Cifuente 11'; Ibarra 28'; Caicedo 85'

Estadio Provincial de Yacuiba, Yacuiba
Attendance: 12,000
Referee: Michael Espinoza (Peru)

30 May 2017
17:15 UTC−5

Universidad Católica (Ecuador)	3–0	(Bolivia) Petrolero
Cifuente 25', 49', 59'	Report

Estadio Olímpico Atahualpa, Quito
Attendance: 200
Referee: Adrián Cabello (Venezuela)

Universidad Católica won 6–1 on aggregate and advanced to the second stage.

=== Match G4 ===
28 February 2017
19:45 UTC−5

LDU Quito (Ecuador)	2–2	(Uruguay) Defensor Sporting
Barcos 9' (pen.); Guerrero 87'	Report	Cardaccio 3'; Gómez 49'

Estadio de Liga Deportiva Universitaria, Quito
Attendance: 35,000
Referee: Gery Vargas (Bolivia)

30 May 2017
21:45 UTC−3

Defensor Sporting (Uruguay)	1–2	(Ecuador) LDU Quito
Cabrera 69'	Report	Cangá 3'; Barcos 72'

Estadio Centenario, Montevideo
Attendance: 7,000
Referee: Patricio Loustau (Argentina)

LDU Quito won 4–3 on aggregate and advanced to the second stage.

=== Match G5 ===
5 April 2017
19:15 UTC−3

Everton (Chile)	1–0	(Colombia) Patriotas
Cerato 53'	Report

Estadio Sausalito, Viña del Mar
Attendance: 11,000
Referee: Juan Albarracín (Ecuador)

30 May 2017
19:45 UTC−5

Patriotas (Colombia)	1–0	(Chile) Everton
L. Vásquez 33'	Report
Penalties
O. Vásquez (penalty scored); Luna (penalty scored); Mosquera (penalty missed); Rendón (penalty scored); Valoyes (penalty scored)	4–3	(penalty scored) Becerra; (penalty scored) Suárez; (penalty scored) Leyton; (penalty missed) Almeida; (penalty missed) Ragusa

Estadio La Independencia, Tunja
Attendance: 10,000
Referee: Néstor Pitana (Argentina)

Tied 1–1 on aggregate, Patriotas won on penalties and advanced to the second stage.

=== Match G6 ===
6 April 2017
18:15 UTC−4

Estudiantes de Caracas (Venezuela)	2–3	(Paraguay) Sol de América
E. Ramírez 5'; L. Ramírez 80'	Report	Giménez 7', 36' (pen.); Villagra 88'

Estadio Olímpico de la UCV, Caracas
Attendance: 400
Referee: Raphael Claus (Brazil)

31 May 2017
18:15 UTC−4

Sol de América (Paraguay)	7–1	(Venezuela) Estudiantes de Caracas
Giménez 5'; Díaz 9' (pen.), 38', 49'; Rojas 31', 47'; Duré 74'	Report	Silva 12'

Estadio Luis Alfonso Giagni, Villa Elisa
Attendance: 5,300
Referee: Omar Ponce (Ecuador)

Sol de América won 10–3 on aggregate and advanced to the second stage.

=== Match G7 ===
2 March 2017
19:15 UTC−3

Cerro Porteño (Paraguay)	1–1	(Venezuela) Caracas
Valdez 22'	Report	Farías 66' (pen.)

Estadio Defensores del Chaco, Asunción
Attendance: 22,000
Referee: Anderson Daronco (Brazil)

11 May 2017
18:15 UTC−4

Caracas (Venezuela)	1–2	(Paraguay) Cerro Porteño
Quijada 48'	Report	Valdez 65' (pen.); Villalba 83'

Estadio Olímpico de la UCV, Caracas
Attendance: 1,200
Referee: Ricardo Marques (Brazil)

Cerro Porteño won 3–2 on aggregate and advanced to the second stage.

=== Match G8 ===
1 March 2017
18:15 UTC−4

Deportivo Anzoátegui (Venezuela)	3–0	(Argentina) Huracán
Ortiz 7'; Ricardo Martins 12' (pen.); Canelón 21'	Report

Estadio José Antonio Anzoátegui, Puerto la Cruz
Attendance: 2,500
Referee: Éber Aquino (Paraguay)

31 May 2017
19:15 UTC−3

Huracán (Argentina)	4–0	(Venezuela) Deportivo Anzoátegui
Mendoza 22'; Briasco 52'; Cuomo 55'; Kaku 90+2'	Report

Estadio Tomás Adolfo Ducó, Buenos Aires
Attendance: 7,000
Referee: Jorge Osorio (Chile)

Huracán won 4–3 on aggregate and advanced to the second stage.

=== Match G9 ===
6 April 2017
20:45 UTC−4

Oriente Petrolero (Bolivia)	1–1	(Ecuador) Deportivo Cuenca
Freitas 33'	Report	Dinenno 47'

Estadio Ramón Tahuichi Aguilera, Santa Cruz de la Sierra
Attendance: 15,500
Referee: Anderson Daronco (Brazil)

1 June 2017
19:45 UTC−5

Deportivo Cuenca (Ecuador)	1–1	(Bolivia) Oriente Petrolero
Dinenno 43'	Report	Freitas 84' (pen.)
Penalties
Dinenno (penalty scored); Saritama (penalty scored); Hoyos (penalty scored); Cucco (penalty scored); Ávila (penalty scored); Mosquera (penalty scored); Oña (penalty scored); Schunke (penalty missed)	7–8	(penalty scored) Meza; (penalty scored) Román; (penalty scored) Lizio; (penalty scored) Villota; (penalty scored) Freitas; (penalty scored) A. Ribera; (penalty scored) Áñez; (penalty scored) Mostasilla

Estadio Alejandro Serrano Aguilar, Cuenca
Attendance: 15,000
Referee: Wagner Magalhães (Brazil)

Tied 2–2 on aggregate, Oriente Petrolero won on penalties and advanced to the second stage.

=== Match G10 ===
5 April 2017
21:45 UTC−3

Corinthians (Brazil)	2–0	Universidad de Chile
Rodriguinho 40'; Jádson 68'	Report

Arena Corinthians, São Paulo
Attendance: 22,957
Referee: Darío Herrera (Argentina)

10 May 2017
21:45 UTC−3

Universidad de Chile	1–2	(Brazil) Corinthians
Mora 63'	Report	Rodriguinho 36'; Jádson 55'

Estadio Nacional Julio Martínez Prádanos, Santiago
Attendance: 40,000
Referee: Daniel Fedorczuk (Uruguay)

Corinthians won 4–1 on aggregate and advanced to the second stage.

=== Match G11 ===
4 April 2017
21:45 UTC−3

Independiente (Argentina)	0–0	(Peru) Alianza Lima
	Report

Estadio Libertadores de América, Avellaneda
Attendance: 23,000
Referee: Patricio Polic (Chile)

31 May 2017
19:45 UTC−5

Alianza Lima (Peru)	0–1	(Argentina) Independiente
	Report	Rigoni 30'

Estadio Alejandro Villanueva, Lima
Attendance: 27,500
Referee: Anderson Daronco (Brazil)

Independiente won 1–0 on aggregate and advanced to the second stage.

=== Match G12 ===
5 April 2017
19:15 UTC−3

Ponte Preta (Brazil)	0–0	(Argentina) Gimnasia y Esgrima
	Report

Estádio Moisés Lucarelli, Campinas
Attendance: 6,432
Referee: Gustavo Murillo (Colombia)

9 May 2017
21:45 UTC−3

Gimnasia y Esgrima (Argentina)	1–1	(Brazil) Ponte Preta
Rinaudo 28'	Report	Elton 25'

Estadio Juan Carmelo Zerillo, La Plata
Attendance: 8,000
Referee: Esteban Ostojich (Uruguay)

Tied 1–1 on aggregate, Ponte Preta won on away goals and advanced to the second stage.

=== Match G13 ===
28 February 2017
19:15 UTC−3

Boston River (Uruguay)	3–1	(Peru) Comerciantes Unidos
Pereyra 8', 42'; Rodríguez 44' (o.g.)	Report	Palacio 1'

Estadio Gran Parque Central, Montevideo
Attendance: 1,000
Referee: Andrés Rojas (Colombia)

1 June 2017
17:15 UTC−5

Comerciantes Unidos (Peru)	1–1	(Uruguay) Boston River
Rosales 56' (pen.)	Report	Fratta 20'

Estadio Huancayo, Huancayo
Attendance: 3,000
Referee: Raúl Orosco (Bolivia)

Boston River won 4–2 on aggregate and advanced to the second stage.

=== Match G14 ===
2 March 2017
16:00 UTC−5

Juan Aurich (Peru)	0–2	(Argentina) Arsenal
	Report	Boghossian 6'; Wilchez 21'

Estadio Mansiche, Trujillo
Attendance: 2,000
Referee: Jesús Valenzuela (Venezuela)

11 May 2017
19:15 UTC−3

Arsenal (Argentina)	6–1	(Peru) Juan Aurich
Sánchez Sotelo 11', 44'; Bellocq 49'; Bottinelli 53'; Brunetta 70'; Corvalán 78'	Report	Borges 54'

Estadio Julio Humberto Grondona, Sarandí
Attendance: 3,000
Referee: Raúl Orosco (Bolivia)

Arsenal won 8–1 on aggregate and advanced to the second stage.

=== Match G15 ===
28 February 2017
19:15 UTC−3

O'Higgins (Chile)	1–0	(Ecuador) Fuerza Amarilla
Acevedo 80'	Report

Estadio El Teniente, Rancagua
Attendance: 6,544
Referee: Wagner Magalhães (Brazil)

31 May 2017
19:45 UTC−5

Fuerza Amarilla (Ecuador)	2–0	(Chile) O'Higgins
Valencia 21'; Bolaños 86' (pen.)	Report

Estadio George Capwell, Guayaquil
Attendance: 500
Referee: Jonhatan Fuentes (Uruguay)

Fuerza Amarilla won 2–1 on aggregate and advanced to the second stage.

=== Match G16 ===
2 March 2017
19:45 UTC−5

Deportes Tolima (Colombia)	2–1	(Bolivia) Bolívar
Alzate 53'; Pérez 55'	Report	Mosquera 4' (o.g.)

Estadio Manuel Murillo Toro, Ibagué
Attendance: 5,000
Referee: Diego Haro (Peru)

1 June 2017
18:15 UTC−4

Bolívar (Bolivia)	1–0	(Colombia) Deportes Tolima
Arce 45+1' (pen.)	Report

Estadio Hernando Siles, La Paz
Attendance: 17,500
Referee: Sandro Ricci (Brazil)

Tied 2–2 on aggregate, Bolívar won on away goals and advanced to the second stage.

=== Match G17 ===
1 March 2017
21:45 UTC−3

Palestino (Chile)	0–1	Atlético Venezuela
	Report	Herrera 63'

Estadio Nacional Julio Martínez Prádanos, Santiago
Attendance: 3,000
Referee: Gustavo Murillo (Colombia)

10 May 2017
18:15 UTC−4

Atlético Venezuela	0–1	(Chile) Palestino
	Report	Vidal 86'
Penalties
Herrera (penalty scored); C. González (penalty missed); Sojo (penalty scored); Parra (penalty scored); Martínez (penalty missed); Pérez (penalty scored); Graterol (penalty scored); Salazar (penalty scored); J. González (penalty missed)	6–7	(penalty scored) Valencia; (penalty missed) Rosende; (penalty scored) Mazurek; (penalty missed) Luna; (penalty scored) Gutiérrez; (penalty scored) Paredes; (penalty scored) Torres; (penalty scored) Vidal; (penalty scored) Farías

Estadio Brígido Iriarte, Caracas
Attendance: 1,500
Referee: Dewson Freitas (Brazil)

Tied 1–1 on aggregate, Palestino won on penalties and advanced to the second stage.

=== Match G18 ===
6 April 2017
19:15 UTC−3

Sport Recife (Brazil)	3–0	(Uruguay) Danubio
Rithely 34'; Diego Souza 40'; Fabrício 67'	Report

Estádio Ilha do Retiro, Recife
Attendance: 13,582
Referee: Jorge Baliño (Argentina)

11 May 2017
21:45 UTC−3

Danubio (Uruguay)	3–0	(Brazil) Sport Recife
Dos Santos 14'; Olaza 22' (pen.), 55' (pen.)	Report
Penalties
Olaza (penalty scored); G. González (penalty missed); Olivera (penalty scored); Tabárez (penalty missed)	2–4	(penalty scored) Everton Felipe; (penalty scored) Raul Prata; (penalty scored) Fabrício; (penalty scored) André

Estadio Centenario, Montevideo
Attendance: 2,000
Referee: Eduardo Gamboa (Chile)

Tied 3–3 on aggregate, Sport Recife won on penalties and advanced to the second stage.

=== Match G19 ===
1 March 2017
21:45 UTC−3

Racing (Argentina)	1–0	(Colombia) Rionegro Águilas
Mansilla 60'	Report

Estadio Presidente Juan Domingo Perón, Avellaneda
Attendance: 20,000
Referee: Óscar Rojas (Uruguay)

1 June 2017
19:45 UTC−5

Rionegro Águilas (Colombia)	1–1	(Argentina) Racing
Hurtado 57'	Report	Cuadra 18'

Estadio Alberto Grisales, Rionegro
Attendance: 14,325
Referee: Éber Aquino (Paraguay)

Racing won 2–1 on aggregate and advanced to the second stage.

=== Match G20 ===
4 April 2017
21:45 UTC−3

Cruzeiro (Brazil)	2–1	(Paraguay) Nacional
Thiago Neves 25'; Ábila 66'	Report	Santana 4'

Estádio Mineirão, Belo Horizonte
Attendance: 16,784
Referee: Juan Soto (Venezuela)

10 May 2017
18:15 UTC−4

Nacional (Paraguay)	2–1	(Brazil) Cruzeiro
Villagra 16'; A. Bareiro 62'	Report	Thiago Neves 11'
Penalties
Salgueiro (penalty missed); Rojas (penalty scored); Miranda (penalty scored); Rodríguez (penalty missed); Dávalos (penalty scored)	3–2	(penalty missed) Alisson; (penalty scored) Henrique; (penalty scored) Hudson; (penalty missed) Fabrício; (penalty missed) De Arrascaeta

Estadio Defensores del Chaco, Asunción
Attendance: 5,000
Referee: Gustavo Murillo (Colombia)

Tied 3–3 on aggregate, Nacional won on penalties and advanced to the second stage.

=== Match G21 ===
5 April 2017 (Note: The Defensa y Justicia v São Paulo match was originally scheduled on 6 April 2017, 21:45 local time, but was re-scheduled to 5 April 2017, 19:15 local time, due to a general strike decreed in Argentina.)
19:15 UTC−3

Defensa y Justicia (Argentina)	0–0	(Brazil) São Paulo
	Report

Estadio Ciudad de Lanús, Lanús
Attendance: 15,000
Referee: Jesús Valenzuela (Venezuela)

11 May 2017
21:45 UTC−3

São Paulo (Brazil)	1–1	(Argentina) Defensa y Justicia
Thiago Mendes 5'	Report	Castellani 10'

Estádio do Morumbi, São Paulo
Attendance: 14,999
Referee: Ulises Mereles (Paraguay)

Tied 1–1 on aggregate, Defensa y Justicia won on away goals and advanced to the second stage.

=== Match G22 ===
5 April 2017
21:45 UTC−3

Fluminense (Brazil)	2–0	(Uruguay) Liverpool
Henrique Dourado 23'; Richarlison 38'	Report

Estádio do Maracanã, Rio de Janeiro
Attendance: 37,145
Referee: Éber Aquino (Paraguay)

10 May 2017
21:45 UTC−3

Liverpool (Uruguay)	1–0	(Brazil) Fluminense
Ramírez 12'	Report

Estadio Centenario, Montevideo
Attendance: 2,000
Referee: Juan Soto (Venezuela)

Fluminense won 2–1 on aggregate and advanced to the second stage.
