= 2017–18 Racing Club de Avellaneda season =

Racing Club de Avellaneda
2017–18 season
- President: Víctor Blanco
- Manager: Diego Cocca (until 27 November 2017); Juan Ramón Fleita (int.) (from 28 November 2017 to 17 December 2017); Eduardo Coudet (from 17 December 2017)
- Stadium: Estadio Presidente Juan Domingo Perón
- Primera División: 14th
- 2016–17 Copa Argentina: Round of 32
- 2017–18 Copa Argentina: Round of 64
- Copa Sudamericana: Quarter-finals
- Copa Libertadores: Group stage
- Top goalscorer: League: Lisandro López (7); All: Lisandro López (8)

The 2017–18 season is Racing Club de Avellaneda's 33rd consecutive season in the top-flight of Argentine football. The season covers the period from 1 July 2017 to 30 June 2018.

== Current squad ==
As of 22 March 2018.

Note: Flags indicate national team as defined under FIFA eligibility rules; some limited exceptions apply. Players may hold more than one non-FIFA nationality.

No.	Pos.	Nation	Player
1	GK	ARG	Juan Musso
2	DF	ARG	Alejandro Donatti
3	DF	ARG	Leandro Grimi
4	DF	ARG	Iván Pillud
5	MF	ARG	Nery Domínguez (on loan from Querétaro)
6	DF	ARG	Miguel Barbieri
8	MF	ARG	Diego González
32	FW	ARG	Lautaro Martínez
10	GK	ARG	Juan Musso
11	FW	ARG	Braian Mansilla
13	GK	ARG	Javier García
15	FW	ARG	Lisandro López
16	MF	ARG	Marcelo Meli
17	MF	ARG	Martín Ojeda

No.	Pos.	Nation	Player
18	MF	ARG	Augusto Solari
19	MF	ARG	Neri Cardozo
20	DF	ARG	Lucas Orbán
21	DF	ARG	Rodrigo Schlegel
22	FW	ARG	Ricardo Centurión
23	DF	ARG	Alexis Soto
24	GK	ARG	Gastón Gómez
26	DF	ARG	Renzo Saravia (on loan from Belgrano)
27	FW	ARG	Pablo Cuadra
28	MF	ARG	Matías Zaracho
29	DF	ARG	Gonzalo Piovi
30	MF	ARG	Santiago Rosales
30	DF	ARG	Leonardo Sigali
32	FW	ARG	Enrique Triverio

=== Out on loan ===
Note: Flags indicate national team as defined under FIFA eligibility rules; some limited exceptions apply. Players may hold more than one non-FIFA nationality.

No.	Pos.	Nation	Player
—	FW	ARG	Gustavo Bou (at Tijuana until 30 June 2018)
—	MF	ARG	Santiago Rosales (at Olimpia until 31 December 2018)
—	DF	PAR	Juan Patiño (at Olimpia until 31 December 2018)
—	MF	ARG	Nicolás Oroz (at O'Higgins until 31 December 2018)
—	DF	ARG	Sergio Vittor (at Universidad de Concepción until 31 December 2018)
—	FW	ARG	Juan Dinenno (at Barcelona S.C. until 31 December 2018)

No.	Pos.	Nation	Player
—	FW	ARG	Facundo Castillón (at Lanús until 30 June 2018)
—	DF	ARG	Yonathan Cabral (at Atlético Tucumán until 30 June 2018)
—	FW	ARG	Brian Fernández (at Unión La Calera until 31 December 2018)
—	FW	ARG	Martín Pérez Guedes (at Mitre (SdE) until 30 June 2018)
—	FW	ARG	Ricardo Noir (at Huracán until 31 December 2018)

== Transfers ==
=== In ===
Date	Pos.	Name	From	Fee
1 July 2017	DF	(Argentina) Lucas Orbán	(Italy) Genoa	€2,500,000
1 July 2017	DF	(Paraguay) Juan Patiño	(Paraguay) Guaraní	€1,250,000
1 July 2017	DF	(Argentina) Miguel Barbieri	(Argentina) Defensores de Belgrano	€260,000
1 July 2017	DF	(Uruguay) Egidio Arévalo Ríos	(Mexico) Veracruz	Free
18 July 2017	MF	(Argentina) Augusto Solari	(Argentina) River Plate	€2,000,000
18 July 2017	MF	(Argentina) Martín Ojeda	(Argentina) Ferro Carril Oeste	€500,000
19 July 2017	FW	(Colombia) Andrés Ibargüen	(Colombia) Atlético Nacional	€1,000,000
4 August 2017	DF	(Argentina) Alexis Soto	(Argentina) Banfield	€1,350,000
15 August 2017	FW	(Argentina) Enrique Triverio	(Mexico) Toluca	€1,250,000
15 August 2017	GK	(Argentina) Javier García	(Argentina) Tigre	Free
31 December 2017	MF	(Argentina) Brian Fernández	(France) Metz	End of loan
31 December 2017	FW	(Argentina) Juan Dinenno	(Ecuador) Deportivo Cuenca	End of loan
31 December 2017	MF	(Argentina) Nicolás Oroz	(Argentina) Chacarita Juniors	End of loan
5 January 2018	MF	(Argentina) Neri Cardozo	(Mexico) Monterrey	Free
18 January 2018	FW	(Argentina) Ricardo Centurión	(Italy) Genoa	€5,700,000
19 January 2018	DF	(Argentina) Leonardo Sigali	(Croatia) Dinamo Zagreb	€1,680,000
19 January 2018	DF	(Argentina) Alejandro Donatti	(Mexico) Tijuana	€1,600,000
31 January 2018	DF	(Argentina) Gonzalo Piovi	(Argentina) Argentinos Juniors	€800,000

=== Out ===
Date	Pos.	Name	To	Fee
1 July 2017	MF	(Argentina) Luciano Aued	(Chile) Universidad Católica	Free
1 July 2017	GK	(Argentina) Agustín Orion	(Chile) Colo-Colo	Free
1 July 2017	FW	(Argentina) José Luis Gómez	(Argentina) Lanús	€2,200,000
1 July 2017	MF	(Uruguay) Washington Camacho	(Argentina) Rosario Central	€810,000
6 July 2017	DF	(Argentina) Gastón Campi	(Argentina) Estudiantes de La Plata	€525,000
18 July 2017	MF	(Argentina) Francisco Cerro	(Spain) Rayo Vallecano	Free
21 July 2017	FW	(Argentina) Marcos Acuña	(Portugal) Sporting Lisbon	€9,590,000
26 July 2017	DF	(Argentina) Pablo Álvarez	(Argentina) Huracán	Undisclosed
27 July 2017	DF	(Argentina) Germán Voboril	(Chile) Universidad Católica	Free
3 August 2017	MF	(Argentina) Gastón Díaz	(Argentina) Vélez Sarsfield	Free
7 August 2017	MF	(Argentina) Ezequiel Videla	(Argentina) Instituto	Free
31 December 2017	DF	(Argentina) Marco Torsiglieri	(Argentina) Rosario Central	End of loan
5 January 2018	FW	(Colombia) Andrés Ibargüen	(Mexico) América	€3,300,000
30 January 2018	DF	(Uruguay) Egidio Arévalo Ríos	None	Fired

=== Loan in ===
Date from	Date to	Pos.	Name	From
1 July 2017	30 June 2018	MF	(Uruguay) Egidio Arévalo Ríos	(Mexico) Veracruz
7 July 2017	30 June 2018	DF	(Argentina) Renzo Saravia	(Argentina) Belgrano

=== Loan out ===
Date from	Date to	Pos.	Name	To	Fee
1 July 2017	30 June 2018	FW	(Argentina) Gustavo Bou	(Mexico) Tijuana	€3,000,000
18 July 2017	30 June 2018	DF	(Argentina) Yonathan Cabral	(Argentina) Atlético Tucumán	Free
14 August 2017	30 June 2018	MF	(Argentina) Facundo Castillón	(Argentina) Lanús	Free
14 August 2017	30 June 2018	FW	(Argentina) Martín Pérez Guedes	(Argentina) Mitre (Santiago del Estero)	Free
23 August 2017	31 December 2017	FW	(Argentina) Brian Fernández	(France) Metz	Free
1 January 2018	31 December 2018	FW	(Argentina) Santiago Rosales	(Paraguay) Olimpia	€500,000
1 January 2018	31 December 2018	DF	(Paraguay) Juan Patiño	(Paraguay) Olimpia	€125,000
5 January 2018	31 December 2018	FW	(Argentina) Brian Fernández	(Chile) Unión La Calera	Free
9 January 2018	31 December 2018	MF	(Argentina) Nicolás Oroz	(Chile) O'Higgins	€67,000
14 February 2018	31 December 2018	FW	(Argentina) Juan Dinenno	(Ecuador) Barcelona	Free
16 February 2018	31 December 2018	DF	(Argentina) Sergio Vittor	(Chile) Universidad de Concepción	€56,000

== Friendlies ==
=== Pre-season ===
Win Draw Loss

20 July 2017 Friendly	Racing Club (Argentina)	0–1	(Argentina) Defensa y Justicia	Córdoba, Argentina
09:30		Report	I. Rivero	Stadium: Estadio Presidente Perón

20 July 2017 Friendly	Racing Club (Argentina)	0–1	(Argentina) Defensa y Justicia	Córdoba, Argentina
10:45		Report	N. Di Giano	Stadium: Estadio Presidente Perón

26 July 2017 Friendly	Belgrano (Argentina)	Cancelled	(Argentina) Racing Club	Córdoba, Argentina
11:00		Report

10 August 2017 Friendly	Racing Club (Argentina)	5–2	(Argentina) Tristán Suárez	Avellaneda, Argentina
	Li. López; D. González; N. Oroz	Report	J. Vatter; Lu. López	Stadium: Estadio Presidente Juan Domingo Perón

14 August 2017 Friendly	Racing Club (Argentina)	1–1	(Argentina) San Telmo	Avellaneda, Argentina
	Li. López	Report	N. Oviedo	Stadium: Predio Tita Mattiussi

14 August 2017 Friendly	Racing Club (Argentina)	3–0	(Argentina) San Telmo	Avellaneda, Argentina
	Goal	Report		Stadium: Predio Tita Mattiussi

=== Torneos de Verano ===
15 January 2018	Racing Club (Argentina)	0–1	(Argentina) Temperley	Mar del Plata, Argentina
	Soto (yellow card) 90+2'	Report	Arregui (yellow card) 19'; Sánchez Sotelo 31'; Escobar (yellow card) 54'	Stadium: Estadio José María Minella

19 January 2018	Independiente (Argentina)	2–2 (3–1 p)	(Argentina) Racing Club	Mar del Plata, Argentina
	Fernández 9' (pen.), 22'; Amorebieta (yellow card) 56'; Albertengo (yellow card) 81'	Report	Martínez 26', 90'; González (yellow card) 86'; Barbieri (red card) 91'	Stadium: Estadio José María Minella

== Primera División ==
=== League table ===
Pos	Team	Pld	W	D	L	GF	GA	GD	Pts	Qualification
5	Talleres (C)	27	13	7	7	33	20	+13	46	Qualification for Copa Libertadores second stage
6	Independiente	27	13	7	7	29	19	+10	46	Qualification for Copa Sudamericana first stage
7	Racing	27	13	6	8	46	32	+14	45	Qualification for Copa Sudamericana first stage
8	River Plate	27	13	6	8	39	26	+13	45	Qualification for Copa Libertadores group stage (Note: River Plate qualified for the Copa Libertadores group stage by winning the 2018 Copa Libertadores.)
9	Defensa y Justicia	27	13	5	9	41	34	+7	44	Qualification for Copa Sudamericana first stage

Source: AFA
Rules for classification: 1) points; 2) play-off (only if needed to decide championship); 3) goal difference; 4) goals scored; 5) head-to-head points; 6) head-to-head goal difference; 7) head-to-head goals scored.

=== Results by matchday ===
Matchday	1	2	3	4	5	6	7	8	9	10	11	12	13	14	15	16	17	18	19	20	21	22	23	24	25	26	27
Ground	A	H	A	H	A	H	A	H	A	H	A	H	A														
Result	D	W	L	D	L	W	L	D	W	L	D	W															
Position	14	4	12	14	17	18	20	20	15	19	18	14															

Updated to match(es) played on 12 December 2017. Source: Soccerway
A = Away; H = Home; W = Win; D = Draw; L = Loss

27 August 2017 1	San Lorenzo	1–1	Racing Club	Buenos Aires, Argentina
16:05	E. Cerutti 52'	Report	Li. López 13'	Stadium: Estadio Pedro Bidegain; Referee: Fernando Echenique (Argentina)

9 September 2017 2	Racing Club	4–1	Temperley	Avellaneda, Argentina
20:05	E. Triverio 45+2'; M. Zaracho 65'; S. Vittor 73'; A. Ibargüen 86'	Report	R. Costa 81'	Stadium: Estadio Presidente Juan Domingo Perón; Referee: Silvio Trucco (Argentina)

17 September 2017 3	Banfield	1–0	Racing Club	Banfield, Argentina
16:05	D. Cvitanich 18'	Report		Stadium: Estadio Florencio Sola; Referee: Ariel Penel (Argentina)

24 September 2017 4	Racing Club	0–0	San Martín	Avellaneda, Argentina
20:05		Report		Stadium: Estadio Presidente Juan Domingo Perón; Referee: Néstor Pitana (Argentina)

30 September 2017 5	Argentinos Juniors	2–0	Racing Club	Buenos Aires, Argentina
20:05	M. Quiroga 88'; L. Pisculichi 90+2'	Report		Stadium: Estadio Diego Armando Maradona; Referee: Mauro Vigliano (Argentina)

14 October 2017 6	Racing Club	1–0	Tigre	Avellaneda, Argentina
20:05	A. Ibargüen 80'	Report		Stadium: Estadio Presidente Juan Domingo Perón; Referee: Germán Delfino (Argentina)

28 October 2017 7	Atlético Tucumán	3–1	Racing Club	San Miguel de Tucumán, Argentina
18:20	F. Álvarez 4'; G. Acosta 17'; M. Barbieri 21' (o.g.)	Report	L. Martínez 45+4'	Stadium: Estadio Monumental José Fierro; Referee: Fernando Echenique (Argentina)

4 November 2017 8	Racing Club	1–1	Talleres	Avellaneda, Argentina
21:30	A. Ibargüen 66'	Report	M. Torres 53'	Stadium: Estadio Presidente Juan Domingo Perón; Referee: Fernando Rapallini (Argentina)

19 November 2017 9	Boca Juniors	1–2	Racing Club	Buenos Aires, Argentina
19:15	D. Benedetto 41' (pen.)	Report	L. Martínez 37'; A. Solari 54'	Stadium: La Bombonera; Referee: Darío Herrera (Argentina)

25 November 2017 10	Racing Club	0–1	Independiente	Avellaneda, Argentina
21:30		Report	L. Fernández 30'	Stadium: Estadio Presidente Juan Domingo Perón; Referee: Germán Delfino (Argentina)

2 December 2017 11	Newell's Old Boys	2–2	Racing Club	Rosario, Argentina
21:30	L. Leal 12'; B. Sarmiento 33' (pen.)	Report	L. Martínez 21'; Li. López 64'	Stadium: Estadio Marcelo Bielsa; Referee: Ariel Penel (Argentina)

10 December 2017 12	Racing Club	3–1	Gimnasia y Esgrima	Avellaneda, Argentina
19:15	Li. López 45+1', 72'; L. Martínez 90+3'	Report	B. Alemán 3'	Stadium: Estadio Presidente Juan Domingo Perón; Referee: Diego Abal (Argentina)

January 2018 13	Unión Santa Fe	–	Racing Club	Santa Fe, Argentina
		Report		Stadium: Estadio 15 de Abril

== Copa Argentina ==
Win Draw Loss

18 August 2017 R64	Racing Club (Argentina)	2–1	(Argentina) Mitre	Banfield, Argentina
21:10	Li. López 78'; L. Grimi 84'	Report	R. Fergonzi 23'	Stadium: Estadio Florencio Sola; Referee: Nicolás Lamolina (Argentina)

1 September 2017 R32	Racing Club (Argentina)	2–4	(Argentina) Olimpo	Banfield, Argentina
15:00	M. Zaracho 39'; D. González 45'	Report	E. Tellechea 55' (pen.); T. Costa 69'; F. Troyansky 71'; L. Vila 90+4'	Stadium: Estadio Florencio Sola; Referee: Ariel Penel (Argentina)

== Copa Sudamericana ==
Win Draw Loss

=== Second stage ===
27 July 2017 Second leg	Independiente Medellín (Colombia)	2–3 (agg: 3–6)	(Argentina) Racing Club	Santa Cruz de la Sierra, Bolivia
21:45	L. Castro 4', 24'	Report	D. González 45'; P. Cuadra 61' (pen.); B. Mansilla 90'	Stadium: Atanasio Girardot Stadium; Referee: Ulises Mereles (Paraguay)

=== Round of 16 ===
13 September 2017 First leg	Corinthians (Brazil)	1–1	(Argentina) Racing Club	São Paulo, Brazil
21:45	Maycon 30'	Report	E. Triverio 74'	Stadium: Arena Corinthians; Referee: Éber Aquino (Paraguay)

20 September 2017 Second leg	Racing Club (Argentina)	0–0 (agg: a1–1)	(Brazil) Corinthians	Avellaneda, Argentina
21:45		Report		Stadium: Estadio Presidente Juan Domingo Perón; Referee: Leodán González (Uruguay)

=== Quarter-finals ===
24 October 2017 First leg	Libertad (Paraguay)	1–0	(Argentina) Racing Club	Asunción, Paraguay
21:45	S. Salcedo 26'	Report		Stadium: Estadio Dr. Nicolás Léoz; Referee: Raphael Claus (Brazil)

1 November 2017 Second leg	Racing Club (Argentina)	0–0 (agg: 0–1)	(Paraguay) Libertad	Avellaneda, Argentina
19:15		Report		Stadium: Estadio Presidente Juan Domingo Perón; Referee: Anderson Daronco (Brazil)

== Copa Libertadores ==
Win Draw Loss

–
