= Exar =

Exar may refer to:

- Amectran Exar-1, 1979 electric car
- Exar Corporation, American semiconductor manufacturer
- Exar Kun, Star Wars character
- Exar Rosales (born 1984), Peruvian football player
