= Martín Giménez =

Martín Giménez is the name of two footballers:

- Martín Giménez (footballer, born 1988), currently playing for Club Atlético Fénix
- Martín Giménez (footballer, born 1991), currently playing for Club Sol de América
