= Pizzorno =

Pizzorno is an Italian surname from Liguria and southern Piedmont, possibly derived from place names in northern Tuscany. Notable people with the surname include:

- Alessandro Pizzorno (1924–2019), Italian sociologist, political scientist and philosopher
- Ángelo Pizzorno (born 1992), Uruguayan footballer
- Serge Pizzorno (born 1980), British guitarist, vocalist, music producer and songwriter
- Tullio Pizzorno (1921–1988), Italian sailor

== See also ==
- Bianca Pitzorno (born 1942), Italian children's writer
