= Vatter =

Vatter is a surname. Notable people with the surname include:

- Javier Vatter (born 1990), Argentine footballer
- Miguel Vatter, political theorist
- William J. Vatter (1905–1990), American accounting scholar
