= 2017 Copa Libertadores qualifying stages =

The 2017 Copa Libertadores qualifying stages were played from 23 January to 23 February 2017. A total of 19 teams competed in the qualifying stages to decide four of the 32 places in the group stage of the 2017 Copa Libertadores.

== Draw ==
The draw for the qualifying stages was held on 21 December 2016, 20:00 PYST (UTC−3), at the CONMEBOL Convention Centre in Luque, Paraguay.

Teams were seeded by their CONMEBOL ranking of the Copa Libertadores (shown in parentheses), taking into account of the following three factors:

1. Performance in the last 10 years, taking into account Copa Libertadores results in the period 2007–2016
2. Historical coefficient, taking into account Copa Libertadores results in the period 1960–2006
3. Local tournament champion, with bonus points awarded to domestic league champions of the last 10 years

For the first stage, the six teams were drawn into three ties (E1–E3), with the seeded teams hosting the second leg.

First stage draw
| Seeded | Unseeded |
|---|---|
| (Ecuador) Independiente del Valle (24); (Venezuela) Deportivo Táchira (43); (Uruguay) Montevideo Wanderers (63) | (Bolivia) Universitario de Sucre (68); (Paraguay) Deportivo Capiatá (no rank); (Peru) Deportivo Municipal (no rank) |

For the second stage, the 16 teams were drawn into eight ties (C1–C8), with the seeded teams hosting the second leg. Teams from the same association could not be drawn into the same tie, excluding the winners of the first stage, which were unseeded and whose identity was not known at the time of the draw, and could be drawn into the same tie with another team from the same association.

Second stage draw
| Seeded | Unseeded |
|---|---|
| (Paraguay) Olimpia (10); (Chile) Colo-Colo (23); (Bolivia) The Strongest (28); (Peru) Universitario (40); (Chile) Unión Española (46); (Colombia) Junior (56); (Colombia) Millonarios (62); (Ecuador) El Nacional (65) | (Brazil) Atlético Paranaense (71); (Brazil) Botafogo (79); (Uruguay) Cerro (106); (Argentina) Atlético Tucumán (no rank); (Venezuela) Carabobo (no rank); First stage winner E1; First stage winner E2; First stage winner E3 |

For the third stage, no draw was made, and the eight teams were allocated into the following four ties (G1–G4), with the second stage winners C5–C8 hosting the second leg. As the identity of the winners of the second stage was not known at the time of the draw, they could be drawn into the same tie with another team from the same association.

- Second stage winner C1 vs. Second stage winner C8
- Second stage winner C2 vs. Second stage winner C7
- Second stage winner C3 vs. Second stage winner C6
- Second stage winner C4 vs. Second stage winner C5

== Format ==
In the qualifying stages, each tie was played on a home-and-away two-legged basis. If tied on aggregate, the away goals rule would be used. If still tied, extra time would not be played, and the penalty shoot-out would be used to determine the winner (Regulations Article 5.2).

== Bracket ==
The qualifying stages were structured as follows:

- First stage (6 teams): The three winners of the first stage advanced to the second stage to join the 13 teams which were given byes to the second stage.
- Second stage (16 teams): The eight winners of the second stage advanced to the third stage.
- Third stage (8 teams): The four winners of the third stage advanced to the group stage to join the 28 direct entrants. The two best teams eliminated in the third stage entered the Copa Sudamericana second stage.

The bracket was decided based on the first stage draw and second stage draw, which were held on 21 December 2016.

=== Winner G1 ===
First stage
(Brazil) Atlético Paranaense | Bye
(Colombia) Millonarios | Bye
(Paraguay) Deportivo Capiatá | 1 | 0 | 1
(Venezuela) Deportivo Táchira | 0 | 0 | 0
(Peru) Universitario | Bye

Second stage
(Brazil) Atlético Paranaense (p) | 1 | 0 | 1 (4)
(Colombia) Millonarios | 0 | 1 | 1 (2)
(Paraguay) Deportivo Capiatá | 1 | 3 | 4
(Peru) Universitario | 3 | 0 | 3

Third stage
(Brazil) Atlético Paranaense | 3 | 1 | 4
(Paraguay) Deportivo Capiatá | 3 | 0 | 3

=== Winner G2 ===
First stage
(Brazil) Botafogo | Bye
(Chile) Colo-Colo | Bye
(Peru) Deportivo Municipal | 0 | 2 | 2
(Ecuador) Independiente del Valle | 1 | 2 | 3
(Paraguay) Olimpia | Bye

Second stage
(Brazil) Botafogo | 2 | 1 | 3
(Chile) Colo-Colo | 1 | 1 | 2
(Ecuador) Independiente del Valle | 1 | 1 | 2
(Paraguay) Olimpia | 0 | 3 | 3

Third stage
(Brazil) Botafogo (p) | 1 | 0 | 1 (3)
(Paraguay) Olimpia | 0 | 1 | 1 (1)

=== Winner G3 ===
First stage
(Uruguay) Cerro | Bye
(Chile) Unión Española | Bye
(Bolivia) Universitario de Sucre | 3 | 2 | 5
(Uruguay) Montevideo Wanderers | 2 | 5 | 7
(Bolivia) The Strongest | Bye

Second stage
(Uruguay) Cerro | 2 | 0 | 2
(Chile) Unión Española | 3 | 2 | 5
(Uruguay) Montevideo Wanderers | 0 | 0 | 0
(Bolivia) The Strongest | 2 | 4 | 6

Third stage
(Chile) Unión Española | 1 | 0 | 1
(Bolivia) The Strongest | 1 | 5 | 6

=== Winner G4 ===
First stage
(Venezuela) Carabobo | Bye
(Colombia) Junior | Bye
(Argentina) Atlético Tucumán | Bye
(Ecuador) El Nacional | Bye

Second stage
(Venezuela) Carabobo | 0 | 0 | 0
(Colombia) Junior | 1 | 3 | 4
(Argentina) Atlético Tucumán | 2 | 1 | 3
(Ecuador) El Nacional | 2 | 0 | 2

Third stage
(Colombia) Junior | 1 | 1 | 2
(Argentina) Atlético Tucumán | 0 | 3 | 3

== First stage ==
The first legs were played on 23 January, and the second legs were played on 27 January 2017.

| Team 1 | Agg. | Team 2 | 1st leg | 2nd leg |
|---|---|---|---|---|
| Universitario de Sucre (Bolivia) | 5–7 | (Uruguay) Montevideo Wanderers | 3–2 | 2–5 |
| Deportivo Municipal (Peru) | 2–3 | (Ecuador) Independiente del Valle | 0–1 | 2–2 |
| Deportivo Capiatá (Paraguay) | 1–0 | (Venezuela) Deportivo Táchira | 1–0 | 0–0 |

=== Match E1 ===
23 January 2017
18:00 UTC−4

| Universitario de Sucre (Bolivia) | 3–2 | (Uruguay) Montevideo Wanderers |
|---|---|---|
| Melgar 18'; Bravo 27' (pen.); Velasco 65' | Report | Blanco 5'; Palacios 77' |

Estadio Olímpico Patria, Sucre
Attendance: 20,000
Referee: Ulises Mereles (Paraguay)

27 January 2017
19:15 UTC−3

| Montevideo Wanderers (Uruguay) | 5–2 | (Bolivia) Universitario de Sucre |
|---|---|---|
| Blanco 7', 53' (pen.); Santos 20'; Barboza 74'; Palacios 88' | Report | Quintana 43'; Domeneghini 59' |

Estadio Centenario, Montevideo
Attendance: 2,000
Referee: José Argote (Venezuela)

Montevideo Wanderers won 7–5 on aggregate and advanced to the second stage (Match C6).

=== Match E2 ===
23 January 2017
19:15 UTC−5

| Deportivo Municipal (Peru) | 0–1 | (Ecuador) Independiente del Valle |
|---|---|---|
| | Report | Estrada 9' |

Estadio Nacional, Lima
Attendance: 15,000
Referee: Patricio Polic (Chile)

27 January 2017
19:15 UTC−5

| Independiente del Valle (Ecuador) | 2–2 | (Peru) Deportivo Municipal |
|---|---|---|
| Estrada 62'; Cortez 90+3' | Report | Moreno 19'; Larrauri 75' |

Estadio Rumiñahui, Sangolquí
Attendance: 5,000
Referee: Wilson Lamouroux (Colombia)

Independiente del Valle won 3–2 on aggregate and advanced to the second stage (Match C7).

=== Match E3 ===
23 January 2017
19:15 UTC−3

| Deportivo Capiatá (Paraguay) | 1–0 | (Venezuela) Deportivo Táchira |
|---|---|---|
| Lusardi 45+1' | Report |

Estadio Lic. Erico Galeano Segovia, Capiatá
Attendance: 12,000
Referee: Fernando Rapallini (Argentina)

27 January 2017
20:45 UTC−4

| Deportivo Táchira (Venezuela) | 0–0 | (Paraguay) Deportivo Capiatá |
|---|---|---|
| | Report |

Estadio Polideportivo de Pueblo Nuevo, San Cristóbal
Attendance: 25,000
Referee: Wilton Sampaio (Brazil)

Deportivo Capiatá won 1–0 on aggregate and advanced to the second stage (Match C8).

== Second stage ==
The first legs were played on 31 January and 1–2 February, and the second legs were played on 7–9 February 2017.

| Team 1 | Agg. | Team 2 | 1st leg | 2nd leg |
|---|---|---|---|---|
| Atlético Paranaense (Brazil) | 1–1 (4–2 p) | (Colombia) Millonarios | 1–0 | 0–1 |
| Botafogo (Brazil) | 3–2 | (Chile) Colo-Colo | 2–1 | 1–1 |
| Cerro (Uruguay) | 2–5 | (Chile) Unión Española | 2–3 | 0–2 |
| Carabobo (Venezuela) | 0–4 | (Colombia) Junior | 0–1 | 0–3 |
| Atlético Tucumán (Argentina) | 3–2 | (Ecuador) El Nacional | 2–2 | 1–0 |
| Montevideo Wanderers (Uruguay) | 0–6 | (Bolivia) The Strongest | 0–2 | 0–4 |
| Independiente del Valle (Ecuador) | 2–3 | (Paraguay) Olimpia | 1–0 | 1–3 |
| Deportivo Capiatá (Paraguay) | 4–3 | (Peru) Universitario | 1–3 | 3–0 |

=== Match C1 ===
1 February 2017
21:45 UTC−2

| Atlético Paranaense (Brazil) | 1–0 | (Colombia) Millonarios |
|---|---|---|
| Grafite 53' (pen.) | Report |

Arena da Baixada, Curitiba
Attendance: 23,610
Referee: Germán Delfino (Argentina)

8 February 2017
18:45 UTC−5

| Millonarios (Colombia) | 1–0 | (Brazil) Atlético Paranaense |
|---|---|---|
| Duque 58' | Report |
Penalties
| Del Valle (penalty scored); Franco (penalty missed); Cadavid (penalty scored); Núñez (penalty missed) | 2–4 | (penalty scored) Jonathan; (penalty scored) Grafite; (penalty scored) Carlos Alberto; (penalty scored) Felipe Gedoz |

Estadio El Campín, Bogotá
Attendance: 24,210
Referee: Julio Bascuñán (Chile)

Tied 1–1 on aggregate, Atlético Paranaense won on penalties and advanced to the third stage (Match G1).

=== Match C2 ===
1 February 2017
21:45 UTC−2

| Botafogo (Brazil) | 2–1 | (Chile) Colo-Colo |
|---|---|---|
| Airton 29'; Pavez 40' (o.g.) | Report | Paredes 50' |

Estádio Olímpico João Havelange, Rio de Janeiro
Attendance: 38,357
Referee: Juan Soto (Venezuela)

8 February 2017
20:45 UTC−3

| Colo-Colo (Chile) | 1–1 | (Brazil) Botafogo |
|---|---|---|
| Emerson Silva 2' (o.g.) | Report | Rodrigo Pimpão 80' |

Estadio Monumental David Arellano, Santiago
Attendance: 42,000
Referee: Patricio Loustau (Argentina)

Botafogo won 3–2 on aggregate and advanced to the third stage (Match G2).

=== Match C3 ===
31 January 2017
20:00 UTC−3

| Cerro (Uruguay) | 2–3 | (Chile) Unión Española |
|---|---|---|
| Pellejero 41'; Pizzorno 76' | Report | Churín 35'; Salom 45+1'; Jaime 88' |

Estadio Luis Tróccoli, Montevideo
Attendance: 12,000
Referee: Luiz Flávio de Oliveira (Brazil)

7 February 2017
21:15 UTC−3

| Unión Española (Chile) | 2–0 | (Uruguay) Cerro |
|---|---|---|
| Ampuero 34'; Jaime 72' | Report |

Estadio Santa Laura-Universidad SEK, Independencia
Attendance: 15,000
Referee: Sandro Ricci (Brazil)

Unión Española won 5–2 on aggregate and advanced to the third stage (Match G3).

=== Match C4 ===
31 January 2017
20:15 UTC−4

| Carabobo (Venezuela) | 0–1 | (Colombia) Junior |
|---|---|---|
| | Report | Aponzá 31' |

Estadio Misael Delgado, Valencia
Attendance: 10,000
Referee: Raúl Orosco (Bolivia)

7 February 2017
19:00 UTC−5

| Junior (Colombia) | 3–0 | (Venezuela) Carabobo |
|---|---|---|
| Ovelar 16'; Estrada 40'; Rangel 79' | Report |

Estadio Jaime Morón León, Cartagena
Attendance: 5,000
Referee: Enrique Cáceres (Paraguay)

Junior won 4–0 on aggregate and advanced to the third stage (Match G4).

=== Match C5 ===
31 January 2017
22:00 UTC−3

| Atlético Tucumán (Argentina) | 2–2 | (Ecuador) El Nacional |
|---|---|---|
| Zampedri 2'; Barbona 77' | Report | F. Borja 39'; De Jesús 83' |

Estadio Monumental José Fierro, Tucumán
Attendance: 30,000
Referee: Ricardo Marques (Brazil)

7 February 2017
20:40 UTC−5 (Note: The El Nacional v Atlético Tucumán match was originally to be kicked off at 19:15 local time, but was delayed by 85 minutes due to the late arrival of Atlético Tucumán.)

| El Nacional (Ecuador) | 0–1 | (Argentina) Atlético Tucumán |
|---|---|---|
| | Report | Zampedri 63' |

Estadio Olímpico Atahualpa, Quito
Attendance: 24,000
Referee: Andrés Cunha (Uruguay)

Atlético Tucumán won 3–2 on aggregate and advanced to the third stage (Match G4).

=== Match C6 ===
2 February 2017
19:15 UTC−3

| Montevideo Wanderers (Uruguay) | 0–2 | (Bolivia) The Strongest |
|---|---|---|
| | Report | Chumacero 9'; Alonso 61' |

Estadio Centenario, Montevideo
Attendance: 2,000
Referee: Jorge Osorio (Chile)

9 February 2017
18:15 UTC−4

| The Strongest (Bolivia) | 4–0 | (Uruguay) Montevideo Wanderers |
|---|---|---|
| Alonso 38', 59'; Chumacero 41'; D. Bejarano 80' | Report |

Estadio Hernando Siles, La Paz
Attendance: 16,000
Referee: Roddy Zambrano (Ecuador)

The Strongest won 6–0 on aggregate and advanced to the third stage (Match G3).

=== Match C7 ===
2 February 2017
19:00 UTC−5

| Independiente del Valle (Ecuador) | 1–0 | (Paraguay) Olimpia |
|---|---|---|
| Segovia 36' | Report |

Estadio Rumiñahui, Sangolquí
Attendance: 5,000
Referee: Néstor Pitana (Argentina)

9 February 2017
20:45 UTC−3

| Olimpia (Paraguay) | 3–1 | (Ecuador) Independiente del Valle |
|---|---|---|
| J. Benítez 8'; Montenegro 26'; Santa Cruz 81' | Report | Cortez 43' |

Estadio Defensores del Chaco, Asunción
Attendance: 15,000
Referee: Wilmar Roldán (Colombia)

Olimpia won 3–2 on aggregate and advanced to the third stage (Match G2).

=== Match C8 ===
2 February 2017
21:15 UTC−3

| Deportivo Capiatá (Paraguay) | 1–3 | (Peru) Universitario |
|---|---|---|
| Gamarra 69' | Report | Gómez 14'; Rengifo 29'; Manicero 82' |

Estadio Lic. Erico Galeano Segovia, Capiatá
Attendance: 12,000
Referee: Omar Ponce (Ecuador)

9 February 2017
19:15 UTC−5

| Universitario (Peru) | 0–3 | (Paraguay) Deportivo Capiatá |
|---|---|---|
| | Report | Gamarra 13', 34'; Pérez 66' |

Estadio Monumental, Lima
Attendance: 25,000
Referee: Mauro Vigliano (Argentina)

Deportivo Capiatá won 4–3 on aggregate and advanced to the third stage (Match G1).

== Third stage ==
The first legs were played on 15–16 February, and the second legs were played on 22–23 February 2017.

| Team 1 | Agg. | Team 2 | 1st leg | 2nd leg |
|---|---|---|---|---|
| Atlético Paranaense (Brazil) | 4–3 | (Paraguay) Deportivo Capiatá | 3–3 | 1–0 |
| Botafogo (Brazil) | 1–1 (3–1 p) | (Paraguay) Olimpia | 1–0 | 0–1 |
| Unión Española (Chile) | 1–6 | (Bolivia) The Strongest | 1–1 | 0–5 |
| Junior (Colombia) | 2–3 | (Argentina) Atlético Tucumán | 1–0 | 1–3 |

=== Match G1 ===
15 February 2017
21:45 UTC−2

| Atlético Paranaense (Brazil) | 3–3 | (Paraguay) Deportivo Capiatá |
|---|---|---|
| Felipe Gedoz 19', 58' (pen.); Pablo 84' | Report | Noguera 43'; N. González 52', 88' |

Arena da Baixada, Curitiba
Attendance: 22,721
Referee: Daniel Fedorczuk (Uruguay)

22 February 2017
21:45 UTC−3

| Deportivo Capiatá (Paraguay) | 0–1 | (Brazil) Atlético Paranaense |
|---|---|---|
| | Report | L. González 11' |

Estadio Lic. Erico Galeano Segovia, Capiatá
Attendance: 10,000
Referee: Néstor Pitana (Argentina)

Atlético Paranaense won 4–3 on aggregate and advanced to the group stage (Group 4).

=== Match G2 ===
15 February 2017
21:45 UTC−2

| Botafogo (Brazil) | 1–0 | (Paraguay) Olimpia |
|---|---|---|
| Rodrigo Pimpão 36' | Report |

Estádio Olímpico João Havelange, Rio de Janeiro
Attendance: 29,514
Referee: Roddy Zambrano (Ecuador)

22 February 2017
21:45 UTC−3

| Olimpia (Paraguay) | 1–0 | (Brazil) Botafogo |
|---|---|---|
| Montenegro 79' | Report |
Penalties
| Ortiz (penalty missed); Mendoza (penalty missed); Ferreira (penalty scored); J. Benítez (penalty missed) | 1–3 | (penalty scored) Camilo; (penalty scored) Rodrigo Pimpão; (penalty scored) Victor Luis |

Estadio Defensores del Chaco, Asunción
Attendance: 30,000
Referee: Julio Bascuñán (Chile)

Tied 1–1 on aggregate, Botafogo won on penalties and advanced to the group stage (Group 1).

=== Match G3 ===
16 February 2017
21:00 UTC−3

| Unión Española (Chile) | 1–1 | (Bolivia) The Strongest |
|---|---|---|
| Churín 90+2' | Report | Chumacero 27' |

Estadio Santa Laura-Universidad SEK, Independencia
Attendance: 9,000
Referee: Wilmar Roldán (Colombia)

23 February 2017
20:00 UTC−4

| The Strongest (Bolivia) | 5–0 | (Chile) Unión Española |
|---|---|---|
| Veizaga 11'; Chumacero 23'; Escobar 50', 72', 77' | Report |

Estadio Hernando Siles, La Paz
Attendance: 23,000
Referee: Enrique Cáceres (Paraguay)

The Strongest won 6–1 on aggregate and advanced to the group stage (Group 2).

=== Match G4 ===
16 February 2017
17:15 UTC−5

| Junior (Colombia) | 1–0 | (Argentina) Atlético Tucumán |
|---|---|---|
| Aponzá 71' | Report |

Estadio Jaime Morón León, Cartagena
Attendance: 2,000
Referee: Sandro Ricci (Brazil)

23 February 2017
19:15 UTC−3

| Atlético Tucumán (Argentina) | 3–1 | (Colombia) Junior |
|---|---|---|
| Aliendro 19'; Menéndez 23'; Zampedri 28' | Report | Hernández 83' |

Estadio Monumental José Fierro, Tucumán
Attendance: 35,000
Referee: Víctor Carrillo (Peru)

Atlético Tucumán won 3–2 on aggregate and advanced to the group stage (Group 5).

== Copa Sudamericana qualification ==
The two best teams eliminated in the third stage entered the Copa Sudamericana second stage. Only matches in the third stage were considered for the ranking of teams.

| Pos | Match | Third stage losers | Pld | W | D | L | GF | GA | GD | Pts | Qualification |
|---|---|---|---|---|---|---|---|---|---|---|---|
| 1 | G2 | (Paraguay) Olimpia | 2 | 1 | 0 | 1 | 1 | 1 | 0 | 3 | Copa Sudamericana |
| 2 | G4 | (Colombia) Junior | 2 | 1 | 0 | 1 | 2 | 3 | −1 | 3 | Copa Sudamericana |
| 3 | G1 | (Paraguay) Deportivo Capiatá | 2 | 0 | 1 | 1 | 3 | 4 | −1 | 1 | |
| 4 | G3 | (Chile) Unión Española | 2 | 0 | 1 | 1 | 1 | 6 | −5 | 1 | |

Source: CONMEBOL
Rules for classification: 1) Points; 2) Goal difference; 3) Goals scored; 4) Away goals scored; 5) CONMEBOL ranking (Regulations Article 3.6).
