= 2017 Copa Sudamericana second stage =

The 2017 Copa Sudamericana second stage was played from 27 June to 9 August 2017. A total of 32 teams competed in the second stage to decide the 16 places in the final stages of the 2017 Copa Sudamericana.

== Draw ==
The draw for the second stage was held on 14 June 2017, 20:00 PYT (UTC−4), at the CONMEBOL Convention Center in Luque, Paraguay. For the second stage, the teams were allocated to two pots according to their previous results in this season:

- Pot 1: 10 teams transferred from the Copa Libertadores and six best winners of the first stage from the Copa Sudamericana
- Pot 2: 16 remaining winners of the first stage from the Copa Sudamericana

The 32 teams were drawn into 16 ties (O1–O16) between a team from Pot 1 and a team from Pot 2, with the teams from Pot 1 hosting the second leg. Teams from the same association could be drawn into the same tie.

The following were the 10 teams transferred from the Copa Libertadores (two best teams eliminated in the third stage of qualifying and eight third-placed teams in the group stage).

Match	Best teams eliminated in third stage	Second stage draw
G2	(Paraguay) Olimpia	Pot 1
G4	(Colombia) Junior	Pot 1
Group	Third-placed teams in group stage	Second stage draw
1	(Argentina) Estudiantes	Pot 1
2	(Colombia) Santa Fe	Pot 1
3	(Colombia) Independiente Medellín	Pot 1
4	(Brazil) Flamengo	Pot 1
5	(Argentina) Atlético Tucumán	Pot 1
6	(Paraguay) Libertad	Pot 1
7	(Brazil) Chapecoense	Pot 1
8	(Chile) Deportes Iquique	Pot 1

The following were the 22 winners of the first stage from the Copa Sudamericana. Matches in the first stage were considered for the ranking of teams for the second stage draw.

Pos	Match	First stage winners	Pld	W	D	L	GF	GA	GD	Pts	Second stage draw
1	G6	(Paraguay) Sol de América	2	2	0	0	10	3	+7	6	Pot 1
2	G14	(Argentina) Arsenal	2	2	0	0	8	1	+7	6	Pot 1
3	G3	(Ecuador) Universidad Católica	2	2	0	0	6	1	+5	6	Pot 1
4	G10	(Brazil) Corinthians	2	2	0	0	4	1	+3	6	Pot 1
5	G13	(Uruguay) Boston River	2	1	1	0	4	2	+2	4	Pot 1
6	G4	(Ecuador) LDU Quito	2	1	1	0	4	3	+1	4	Pot 1
7	G7	(Paraguay) Cerro Porteño	2	1	1	0	3	2	+1	4	Pot 2
8	G19	(Argentina) Racing	2	1	1	0	2	1	+1	4	Pot 2
9	G11	(Argentina) Independiente	2	1	1	0	1	0	+1	4	Pot 2
10	G1	(Bolivia) Nacional Potosí	2	1	0	1	4	3	+1	3	Pot 2
11	G8	(Argentina) Huracán	2	1	0	1	4	3	+1	3	Pot 2
12	G22	(Brazil) Fluminense	2	1	0	1	2	1	+1	3	Pot 2
13	G15	(Ecuador) Fuerza Amarilla	2	1	0	1	2	1	+1	3	Pot 2
14	G20	(Paraguay) Nacional	2	1	0	1	3	3	0	3	Pot 2
15	G18	(Brazil) Sport Recife	2	1	0	1	3	3	0	3	Pot 2
16	G16	(Bolivia) Bolívar	2	1	0	1	2	2	0	3	Pot 2
17	G2	(Colombia) Deportivo Cali	2	1	0	1	2	2	0	3	Pot 2
18	G17	(Chile) Palestino	2	1	0	1	1	1	0	3	Pot 2
19	G5	(Colombia) Patriotas	2	1	0	1	1	1	0	3	Pot 2
20	G9	(Bolivia) Oriente Petrolero	2	0	2	0	2	2	0	2	Pot 2
21	G12	(Brazil) Ponte Preta	2	0	2	0	1	1	0	2	Pot 2
22	G21	(Argentina) Defensa y Justicia	2	0	2	0	1	1	0	2	Pot 2

Source: CONMEBOL
Rules for classification: 1) Points; 2) Goal difference; 3) Goals scored; 4) Away goals scored; 5) CONMEBOL ranking.

== Format ==
In the second stage, each tie was played on a home-and-away two-legged basis. If tied on aggregate, the away goals rule would be used. If still tied, extra time would not be played, and the penalty shoot-out would be used to determine the winner (Regulations Article 6.1).

The 16 winners of the second stage advanced to the round of 16 of the knockout stages.

== Matches ==
The first legs were played on 27–29 June, 5–6 and 11–13 July, and the second legs were played on 25–27 July, 1–3 and 9 August 2017.

Team 1	Agg.	Team 2	1st leg	2nd leg
Racing (Argentina)	6–3	(Colombia) Independiente Medellín	3–1	3–2
Deportivo Cali (Colombia)	2–2 (2–3 p)	(Colombia) Junior	1–1	1–1
Palestino (Chile)	2–10	(Brazil) Flamengo	2–5	0–5
Nacional Potosí (Bolivia)	0–3	(Argentina) Estudiantes	0–1	0–2
Independiente (Argentina)	6–3	(Chile) Deportes Iquique	4–2	2–1
Bolívar (Bolivia)	1–1 (5–6 p)	(Ecuador) LDU Quito	1–0	0–1
Ponte Preta (Brazil)	4–1	(Paraguay) Sol de América	1–0	3–1
Fuerza Amarilla (Ecuador)	1–2	(Colombia) Santa Fe	1–1	0–1
Huracán (Argentina)	1–7	(Paraguay) Libertad	1–5	0–2
Sport Recife (Brazil)	3–2	(Argentina) Arsenal	2–0	1–2
Fluminense (Brazil)	6–1	(Ecuador) Universidad Católica	4–0	2–1
Oriente Petrolero (Bolivia)	2–6	(Argentina) Atlético Tucumán	2–3	0–3
Nacional (Paraguay)	3–3 (a)	(Paraguay) Olimpia	1–1	2–2
Defensa y Justicia (Argentina)	1–1 (2–4 p)	(Brazil) Chapecoense	1–0	0–1
Cerro Porteño (Paraguay)	6–2	(Uruguay) Boston River	2–1	4–1
Patriotas (Colombia)	1–3	(Brazil) Corinthians	1–1	0–2

=== Match O1 ===
29 June 2017
21:45 UTC−3

Racing (Argentina)	3–1	(Colombia) Independiente Medellín
Barbieri 15'; Fernández 23'; Acuña 56'	Report	Toloza 46'

Estadio Presidente Juan Domingo Perón, Avellaneda
Attendance: 20,000
Referee: Anderson Daronco (Brazil)

27 July 2017
19:45 UTC−5

Independiente Medellín (Colombia)	2–3	(Argentina) Racing
Castro 4', 24'	Report	González 45'; Cuadra 61' (pen.); Mansilla 90'

Estadio Atanasio Girardot, Medellín
Attendance: 18,200
Referee: Ulises Mereles (Paraguay)

Racing won 6–3 on aggregate and advanced to the round of 16 (Match A).

=== Match O2 ===
13 July 2017
19:45 UTC−5

Deportivo Cali (Colombia)	1–1	(Colombia) Junior
Benedetti 36'	Report	Chará 73'

Estadio Deportivo Cali, Palmira
Attendance: 17,000
Referee: Néstor Pitana (Argentina)

3 August 2017
19:45 UTC−5

Junior (Colombia)	1–1	(Colombia) Deportivo Cali
Ovelar 56' (pen.)	Report	Sambueza 32'
Penalties
Barrera (penalty scored); Chará (penalty scored); Pico (penalty missed); Escalante (penalty scored); T. Gutiérrez (penalty missed)	3–2	(penalty scored) Pérez; (penalty missed) Amaya; (penalty scored) Giraldo; (penalty missed) Orejuela; (penalty missed) Moiraghi

Estadio Metropolitano Roberto Meléndez, Barranquilla
Attendance: 25,400
Referee: Roberto Tobar (Chile)

Tied 2–2 on aggregate, Junior won on penalties and advanced to the round of 16 (Match B).

=== Match O3 ===
5 July 2017
20:45 UTC−4

Palestino (Chile)	2–5	(Brazil) Flamengo
Romo 49'; Vidal 56'	Report	Réver 46'; Berrío 58'; Leandro Damião 60'; Rafael Vaz 81'; Éverton Ribeiro 88' (pen.)

Estadio San Carlos de Apoquindo, Las Condes
Attendance: 7,000
Referee: Fernando Rapallini (Argentina)

9 August 2017
21:45 UTC−3

Flamengo (Brazil)	5–0	(Chile) Palestino
Felipe Vizeu 3'; Geuvânio 9'; Éverton Ribeiro 41'; Willian Arão 43'; Vinícius Júnior 72'	Report

Estádio Ilha do Urubu, Rio de Janeiro
Attendance: 6,074
Referee: Andrés Rojas (Colombia)

Flamengo won 10–2 on aggregate and advanced to the round of 16 (Match C).

=== Match O4 ===
13 July 2017
18:15 UTC−4

Nacional Potosí (Bolivia)	0–1	(Argentina) Estudiantes
	Report	Rodríguez 79'

Estadio Víctor Agustín Ugarte, Potosí
Attendance: 2,000
Referee: Wilmar Roldán (Colombia)

3 August 2017
19:15 UTC−3

Estudiantes (Argentina)	2–0	(Bolivia) Nacional Potosí
Pavone 45+1' (pen.), 71'	Report

Estadio Ciudad de La Plata, La Plata
Attendance: 31,204
Referee: Leodán González (Uruguay)

Estudiantes won 3–0 on aggregate and advanced to the round of 16 (Match D).

=== Match O5 ===
12 July 2017
21:45 UTC−3

Independiente (Argentina)	4–2	(Chile) Deportes Iquique
Franco 21'; Barco 34'; Fernández 40'; Domínguez 44'	Report	Bielkiewicz 75' (pen.); Espinoza 90+1'

Estadio Libertadores de América, Avellaneda
Attendance: 28,200
Referee: Enrique Cáceres (Paraguay)

2 August 2017
20:45 UTC−4

Deportes Iquique (Chile)	1–2	(Argentina) Independiente
Villalobos 7'	Report	Meza 27'; Albertengo 81'

Estadio Zorros del Desierto, Calama
Attendance: 4,500
Referee: Raphael Claus (Brazil)

Independiente won 6–3 on aggregate and advanced to the round of 16 (Match E).

=== Match O6 ===
12 July 2017
18:15 UTC−4

Bolívar (Bolivia)	1–0	(Ecuador) LDU Quito
Arce 52'	Report

Estadio Hernando Siles, La Paz
Attendance: 30,000
Referee: Mauro Vigliano (Argentina)

2 August 2017
17:15 UTC−5

LDU Quito (Ecuador)	1–0	(Bolivia) Bolívar
Salaberry 90+3'	Report
Penalties
Cárdenas (penalty scored); Cevallos (penalty scored); Salaberry (penalty missed); Anangonó (penalty scored); Barcos (penalty scored); Cangá (penalty scored); Intriago (penalty scored)	6–5	(penalty scored) Arce; (penalty scored) Ferreira; (penalty scored) Riquelme; (penalty missed) Raldes; (penalty scored) Dituro; (penalty scored) Prieto; (penalty missed) Pedraza

Estadio Rodrigo Paz Delgado, Quito
Attendance: 31,250
Referee: Éber Aquino (Paraguay)

Tied 1–1 on aggregate, LDU Quito won on penalties and advanced to the round of 16 (Match F).

=== Match O7 ===
29 June 2017
19:15 UTC−3

Ponte Preta (Brazil)	1–0	(Paraguay) Sol de América
Emerson Sheik 89'	Report

Estádio Moisés Lucarelli, Campinas
Attendance: 6,250
Referee: José Argote (Venezuela)

26 July 2017
18:15 UTC−4

Sol de América (Paraguay)	1–3	(Brazil) Ponte Preta
Toledo 11'	Report	Jádson 8'; Lucca 45+1', 53' (pen.)

Estadio Luis Alfonso Giagni, Villa Elisa
Attendance: 11,120
Referee: Wilson Lamouroux (Colombia)

Ponte Preta won 4–1 on aggregate and advanced to the round of 16 (Match G).

=== Match O8 ===
27 June 2017
19:45 UTC−5

Fuerza Amarilla (Ecuador)	1–1	(Colombia) Santa Fe
Cano 12' (pen.)	Report	Mosquera 7'

Estadio Modelo Alberto Spencer Herrera, Guayaquil
Attendance: 10,000
Referee: Éber Aquino (Paraguay)

25 July 2017
19:45 UTC−5

Santa Fe (Colombia)	1–0	(Ecuador) Fuerza Amarilla
López 90'	Report

Estadio El Campín, Bogotá
Attendance: 15,000
Referee: Anderson Daronco (Brazil)

Santa Fe won 2–1 on aggregate and advanced to the round of 16 (Match H).

=== Match O9 ===
11 July 2017
19:15 UTC−3

Huracán (Argentina)	1–5	(Paraguay) Libertad
González 88'	Report	Ó. Cardozo 3', 28'; Salcedo 57', 84' (pen.); Bareiro 63'

Estadio Tomás Adolfo Ducó, Buenos Aires
Attendance: 7,500
Referee: Wagner Magalhães (Brazil)

1 August 2017
18:15 UTC−4

Libertad (Paraguay)	2–0	(Argentina) Huracán
Recalde 48'; Salcedo 58'	Report

Estadio Dr. Nicolás Léoz, Asunción
Attendance: 6,000
Referee: Michael Espinoza (Peru)

Libertad won 7–1 on aggregate and advanced to the round of 16 (Match H).

=== Match O10 ===
6 July 2017
21:45 UTC−3

Sport Recife (Brazil)	2–0	(Argentina) Arsenal
André 54', 72'	Report

Estádio Ilha do Retiro, Recife
Attendance: 22,500
Referee: Gery Vargas (Bolivia)

27 July 2017
19:15 UTC−3

Arsenal (Argentina)	2–1	(Brazil) Sport Recife
Brunetta 43'; Contreras 64'	Report	André 82'

Estadio Julio Humberto Grondona, Sarandí
Attendance: 14,000
Referee: Jesús Valenzuela (Venezuela)

Sport Recife won 3–2 on aggregate and advanced to the round of 16 (Match G).

=== Match O11 ===
29 June 2017
21:45 UTC−3

Fluminense (Brazil)	4–0	(Ecuador) Universidad Católica
Henrique Dourado 26', 44' (pen.); Richarlison 28'; Wendel 54'	Report

Estádio do Maracanã, Rio de Janeiro
Attendance: 32,250
Referee: Gustavo Murillo (Colombia)

26 July 2017
17:15 UTC−5

Universidad Católica (Ecuador)	1–2	(Brazil) Fluminense
Cifuente 17'	Report	Henrique Dourado 38'; Marlon Freitas 60'

Estadio Olímpico Atahualpa, Quito
Attendance: 1,500
Referee: Darío Herrera (Argentina)

Fluminense won 6–1 on aggregate and advanced to the round of 16 (Match F).

=== Match O12 ===
11 July 2017
20:45 UTC−4

Oriente Petrolero (Bolivia)	2–3	(Argentina) Atlético Tucumán
Freitas 1', 87'	Report	Rodríguez 63'; Bianchi 71'; Zampedri 88'

Estadio Ramón Tahuichi Aguilera, Santa Cruz de la Sierra
Attendance: 3,500
Referee: Juan Albarracín (Ecuador)

1 August 2017
21:45 UTC−3

Atlético Tucumán (Argentina)	3–0	(Bolivia) Oriente Petrolero
Rodríguez 44', 50', 83'	Report

Estadio Monumental José Fierro, Tucumán
Attendance: 20,130
Referee: Sandro Ricci (Brazil)

Atlético Tucumán won 6–2 on aggregate and advanced to the round of 16 (Match E).

=== Match O13 ===
12 July 2017
20:45 UTC−4

Nacional (Paraguay)	1–1	(Paraguay) Olimpia
A. Bareiro 15'	Report	González 19'

Estadio Defensores del Chaco, Asunción
Attendance: 18,460
Referee: Sandro Ricci (Brazil)

2 August 2017
20:45 UTC−4

Olimpia (Paraguay)	2–2	(Paraguay) Nacional
Otálvaro 25'; González 48'	Report	F. Bareiro 41'; Salgueiro 90+6' (pen.)

Estadio Defensores del Chaco, Asunción
Attendance: 40,208
Referee: Wilton Sampaio (Brazil)

Tied 3–3 on aggregate, Nacional won on away goals and advanced to the round of 16 (Match D).

=== Match O14 ===
28 June 2017
19:15 UTC−3

Defensa y Justicia (Argentina)	1–0	(Brazil) Chapecoense
Stefanelli 90+4'	Report

Estadio Norberto Tomaghello, Gobernador Costa
Attendance: 27,000
Referee: Diego Haro (Peru)

25 July 2017
19:15 UTC−3

Chapecoense (Brazil)	1–0	(Argentina) Defensa y Justicia
Túlio de Melo 24'	Report
Penalties
Luiz Antônio (penalty scored); Wellington Paulista (penalty scored); Fabrício Bruno (penalty scored); Lourency (penalty scored)	4–2	(penalty scored) Jerez Silva; (penalty scored) Fredes; (penalty missed) Bareiro; (penalty missed) D. González

Arena Condá, Chapecó
Attendance: 11,324
Referee: Daniel Fedorczuk (Uruguay)

Tied 1–1 on aggregate, Chapecoense won on penalties and advanced to the round of 16 (Match C).

=== Match O15 ===
11 July 2017
20:45 UTC−4

Cerro Porteño (Paraguay)	2–1	(Uruguay) Boston River
Oviedo 75'; Molina 78'	Report	Foliados 12'

Estadio Defensores del Chaco, Asunción
Attendance: 20,000
Referee: Jesús Valenzuela (Venezuela)

26 July 2017
21:45 UTC−3

Boston River (Uruguay)	1–4	(Paraguay) Cerro Porteño
Fe. Rodríguez 78'	Report	J. Rojas 21' (pen.); Ortigoza 46'; Aguilar 52'; Candia 67'

Estadio Gran Parque Central, Montevideo
Attendance: 4,500
Referee: Víctor Carrillo (Peru)

Cerro Porteño won 6–2 on aggregate and advanced to the round of 16 (Match B).

=== Match O16 ===
28 June 2017
19:45 UTC−5

Patriotas (Colombia)	1–1	(Brazil) Corinthians
Gómez 30'	Report	Balbuena 90+1'

Estadio La Independencia, Tunja
Attendance: 11,000
Referee: Mario Díaz de Vivar (Paraguay)

26 July 2017
21:45 UTC−3

Corinthians (Brazil)	2–0	(Colombia) Patriotas
Balbuena 27'; Pedrinho 90'	Report

Arena Corinthians, São Paulo
Attendance: 34,808
Referee: Roberto Tobar (Chile)

Corinthians won 3–1 on aggregate and advanced to the round of 16 (Match A).
