= Tomás Rojas (footballer) =

Paraguayan footballer (born 1997)

Personal information
- Full name: Tomás Iván Rojas Gómez
- Date of birth: 17 March 1997 (age 29)
- Place of birth: Lambaré, Paraguay
- Height: 1.73 m (5 ft 8 in)
- Position: Right midfielder

Team information
- Current team: Güemes

Youth career
- Sol de América

Senior career*
Years	Team	Apps	(Gls)
2015–2017	Sol de América	46	(9)
2016	→ Cerro Porteño (loan)	0	(0)
2017–2019	América	0	(0)
2017–2018	→ Sol de América (loan)	33	(4)
2018–2019	→ Atlético Tucumán (loan)	0	(0)
2019	→ Sol de América (loan)	7	(1)
2020–2022	Sol de América	42	(3)
2021	→ Ñublense (loan)	6	(0)
2022	→ Resistencia (loan)	11	(0)
2023	3 de Noviembre	–	(–)
2023	Guaireña	2	(0)
2024	Rubio Ñu	12	(3)
2024	12 de Junio	13	(3)
2025–	Güemes	1	(0)
- * Club domestic league appearances and goals as of 14 October 2024

Tomás Iván Rojas Gómez (born 17 March 1997) is a Paraguayan professional footballer who plays as a right midfielder for Primera Nacional club Güemes.

== Teams ==
- (Paraguay) Sol de América 2015–2016
- (Paraguay) Cerro Porteño 2016
- (Paraguay) Sol de América 2017
- (Mexico) América 2017
- (Paraguay) Sol de América 2017–2018
- (Argentina) Atlético Tucumán 2018–2019
- (Paraguay) Sol de América 2019–2020
- (Chile) Ñublense 2021
- (Paraguay) Resistencia 2022
- (Paraguay) Sol de América 2022
- (Paraguay) 3 de Noviembre 2023
- (Paraguay) Guaireña 2023
- (Paraguay) Rubio Ñu 2024
- (Paraguay) 12 de Junio 2024
- (Argentina) Güemes 2025–present
