= Alexis Bravo =

Argentine footballer

Personal information
- Full name: Adán Alexis Félix Bravo
- Date of birth: September 15, 1984 (age 42)
- Place of birth: Buenos Aires, Argentina
- Height: 1.69 m (5 ft 7 in)
- Position: Midfielder

Senior career*
| Years | Team | Apps | (Gls) |
| 2002–2003 | Atlético Tucumán | | |
| 2004 | Ñuñorco | 7 | (1) |
| 2004–2005 | Atlético Tucumán | 57 | (10) |
| 2005–2008 | Central Córdoba | | |
| 2008–2009 | Concepción FC | | |
| 2009 | Centauros | | |
| 2010 | Sportivo Patria | 21 | (5) |
| 2010–2011 | Deportes Quindío | 3 | (0) |
| 2011–2012 | Guabirá | 32 | (8) |
| 2012–2013 | Real Potosí | 41 | (12) |
| 2013–2014 | San José | 35 | (9) |
| 2014–2015 | Wilstermann | 12 | (2) |
| 2015–2017 | Universitario de Sucre | 79 | (20) |
| 2017 | Mitre SdE | 3 | (1) |
| 2018 | Independiente Petrolero | | |
- * Club domestic league appearances and goals

Alexis Bravo (born September 15, 1984) is an Argentinian footballer.
