= Ángelo Pizzorno =

Uruguayan footballer (born 1992)

Personal information
- Full name: Ángelo Matías Pizzorno Bracco
- Date of birth: October 21, 1992 (age 34)
- Place of birth: Santa Lucía, Uruguay
- Height: 1.85 m (6 ft 1 in)
- Position: Centre back

Team information
- Current team: Santos

Youth career
- 2005–2010: Wanderers de Santa Lucía
- 2010: Danubio

Senior career*
Years	Team	Apps	(Gls)
2011–2015	Wanderers de Santa Lucía		
2015–2019	Cerro	25	(1)
2017–2018	→ Unión Española (loan)	31	(0)
2019–2020	Burgos	6	(0)
2020–2021	Cienciano	24	(2)
2021–2022	Aucas	29	(1)
2022–2023	Albion	29	(3)
2023–2024	Alianza Atlético	23	(4)
2025	Los Chankas	5	(0)
2026–	Santos	0	(0)
- * Club domestic league appearances and goals as of 15:37, 8 March 2026 (UTC)

Ángelo Matías Pizzorno Bracco (born October 21, 1992) is a Uruguayan footballer who plays as a centre back for Peruvian Segunda División club Santos.

== Life and career ==
Pizzorno was born in Santa Lucía, in the Canelones Department of Uruguay. He was a late entrant into professional football. He joined his first amateur club, Wanderers de Santa Lucía, as an under-14 in 2005, and had a short spell in the youth system of Primera División club Danubio, but soon returned to Wanderers, where he played alongside his brother Gonzalo. He represented Canelones in the Copa Nacional de Selecciones, both at under-18 and senior level, and was a member of the team that won the southern regional title in 2013–14, scoring twice in the final as Canelones beat Colonia 5–3 on aggregate.

In January 2015, Pizzorno signed for Primera División club Cerro. He was an unused substitute on the last day of the 2015 Clausura in June, and made his professional debut at the age of 24 the following February, on the first day of the 2016 Clausura, coming on after 84 minutes as his team lost 2–1 to Peñarol. He made eight appearances as Cerro finished third in the table, which enabled them to enter the 2017 Copa Libertadores at the second qualifying stage. They were drawn to meet Unión Española of Chile. Despite Pizzorno making the score 2–2 in the first leg, Cerro conceded late in the match, and went on to lose the tie 5–2 on aggregate.

His performance in a losing cause impressed the opposition's manager, Martín Palermo, to the extent that as soon as the transfer window opened, he signed the player. He started in all but one of the 2017 Torneo de Transición matches as the team finished as runners-up.
