= Miguel Barbieri =

Argentine footballer

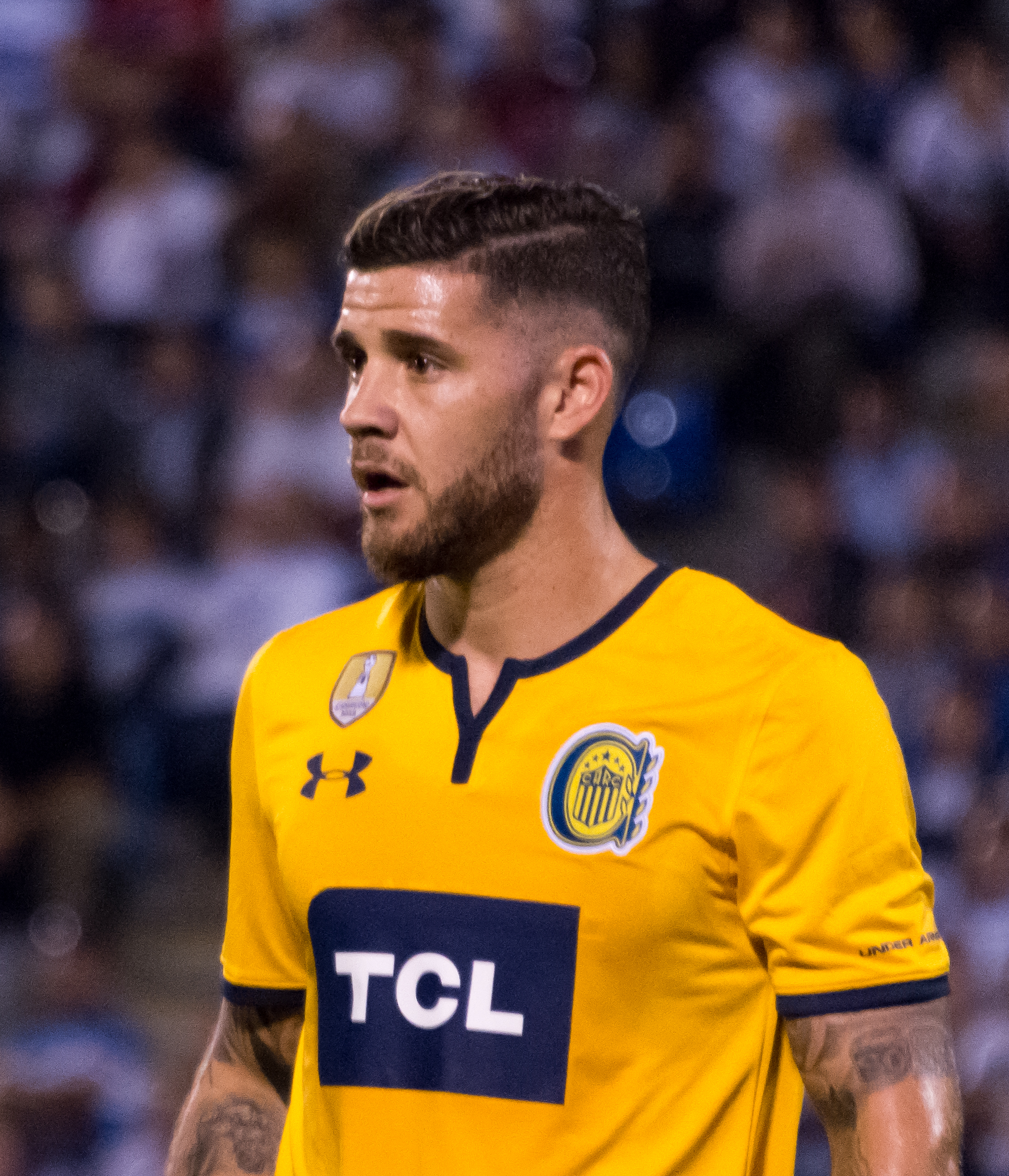
- Barbieri with Rosario Central in 2019

Personal information
- Full name: Miguel Ángel Barbieri
- Date of birth: 24 August 1993 (age 33)
- Place of birth: Buenos Aires, Argentina
- Height: 1.81 m (5 ft 11 1/2 in)
- Position: Centre-back

Team information
- Current team: Universidad de Concepción
- Number: 3

Youth career
- Argentinos Juniors
- Defensores de Belgrano

Senior career*
Years	Team	Apps	(Gls)
2011–2017	Defensores de Belgrano	75	(4)
2016–2017	→ Racing Club (loan)	13	(2)
2017–2020	Racing Club	17	(0)
2018–2019	→ Rosario Central (loan)	22	(0)
2020–2021	Tijuana	20	(0)
2021	→ Toluca (loan)	26	(2)
2023–2024	Querétaro	40	(2)
2024–2025	Rosario Central	10	(0)
2025–2026	Deportivo Riestra	21	(0)
2026–	Universidad de Concepción	1	(0)

International career
2016	Argentina U23	2	(0)
- * Club domestic league appearances and goals as of 1 August 2026

Miguel Ángel Barbieri (born 24 August 1993) is an Argentine professional footballer who plays as a centre-back for Chilean club Universidad de Concepción.

== Club career ==
Barbieri was born in Buenos Aires, Argentina to a Jewish family. Argentinos Juniors were Barbieri's first team in his youth career, prior to joining Defensores de Belgrano's system. He was promoted into the club's first-team during the 2011–12 Primera B Metropolitana, making three appearances as Defensores de Belgrano finished 18th. In the following four seasons, Barbieri made seventy-five appearances with the final campaign, 2015, yielding five goals in forty-one games. In January 2016, Argentine Primera División side Racing Club loaned Barbieri for eighteen months. Two goals in thirteen games followed, which led to Racing signing him permanently in July 2017.

On 15 July 2018, Barbieri joined Rosario Central on loan. He remained until December 2019, making twenty-five appearances whilst with the club; also scoring one goal, versus Aldosivi in the Copa de la Superliga on 20 April 2019. January 2020 saw Barbieri head abroad for the first time, as he agreed terms with Liga MX club Tijuana; amid interest of a renewal from Rosario. He made his debut on 10 January in a win over Santos Laguna, having replaced Mauro Lainez with six minutes remaining. In total, the centre-back appeared twenty-four times and netted one goal; on 10 March in the Copa MX against Toluca.

Barbieri would later sign for Toluca, after putting pen to paper on a contract in December 2020; with it commencing in the succeeding January.

In July 2026, Barbieri moved to Chile and signed with Universidad de Concepción from Deportivo Riestra.

== International career ==
Barbieri represented the Argentina U23s at the 2016 Sait Nagjee Trophy in India. He featured in matches against 1860 Munich II and Shamrock Rovers (as captain) as Argentina were eliminated at the group stage.

== Career statistics ==
As of 14 December 2020

Club statistics
Club	Season	League			National cup		League cup		Continental		Other		Total	
Club	Season	Division	Apps	Goals	Apps	Goals	Apps	Goals	Apps	Goals	Apps	Goals	Apps	Goals
Defensores de Belgrano	2011–12	Primera B Metropolitana	3	0	0	0	—		—		0	0	3	0
Defensores de Belgrano	2012–13	Primera B Metropolitana	14	0	0	0	—		—		0	0	14	0
Defensores de Belgrano	2013–14	Primera B Metropolitana	6	0	1	0	—		—		0	0	7	0
Defensores de Belgrano	2014	Primera C Metropolitana	13	0	0	0	—		—		0	0	13	0
Defensores de Belgrano	2015	Primera B Metropolitana	39	4	1	0	—		—		1 (Note: Appearance(s) in Primera B Metropolitana play-offs)	1	41	5
Defensores de Belgrano	2016	Primera B Metropolitana	0	0	0	0	—		—		0	0	0	0
Defensores de Belgrano	2016–17	Primera B Metropolitana	0	0	0	0	—		—		0	0	0	0
Defensores de Belgrano	Total		75	4	2	0	—		—		1	1	78	5
Racing Club (loan)	2016	Primera División	2	0	0	0	—		0	0	0	0	2	0
Racing Club (loan)	2016–17	Primera División	11	2	0	0	—		0	0	0	0	11	2
Racing Club	2017–18	Primera División	17	0	3	0	—		8 (Note: Appearance(s) in the Copa Libertadores and Copa Sudamericana)	1	0	0	28	1
Racing Club	2018–19	Primera División	0	0	0	0	—		0	0	0	0	0	0
Racing Club	2019–20	Primera División	0	0	0	0	0	0	0	0	0	0	0	0
Racing Club	Total		30	2	3	0	0	0	7	1	0	0	40	3
Rosario Central (loan)	2018–19	Primera División	11	0	1	0	1	1	5 (Note: Appearance(s) in the Copa Libertadores)	0	1 (Note: Appearance(s) in the Supercopa Argentina)	0	19	1
Rosario Central (loan)	2019–20	Primera División	11	0	0	0	0	0	—		0	0	11	0
Rosario Central (loan)	Total		22	0	1	0	1	1	5	0	1	0	30	1
Tijuana	2019–20	Liga MX	8	0	3	1	—		—		0	0	11	1
Tijuana	2020–21	Liga MX	12	0	1	0	—		—		0	0	13	0
Tijuana	Total		20	0	4	1	—		—		0	0	24	1
Toluca	2020–21	Liga MX	0	0	0	0	—		—		0	0	0	0
Career total			147	6	10	1	1	1	13	1	2	1	173	10

== Honours ==
Rosario Central

- Copa Argentina: 2017–18
