= Robinson Aponzá =

Colombian footballer (born 1989)

Personal information
- Full name: Róbinson Aponzá Carabalí
- Date of birth: 11 April 1989 (age 37)
- Place of birth: Buenos Aires, Cauca, Colombia
- Height: 1.74 m (5 ft 9 in)
- Position: Midfielder

Team information
- Current team: Municipal Limeño

Youth career
- América de Cali

Senior career*
Years	Team	Apps	(Gls)
2006-2008	América de Cali	3	(0)
2007	→ Atlético Huila (loan)	10	(1)
2009	Atlético Bucaramanga	19	(3)
2010-2012	Cortuluá	34	(3)
2011	→ Olimpia (loan)	0	(0)
2011	→ Itagüí (loan)	4	(0)
2012	Atlético Bucaramanga	18	(3)
2013	Pumas Morelos	5	(0)
2013-2015	Deportes Tolima	18	(2)
2015-2016	Alianza Atlético	52	(34)
2017	Atlético Junior	12	(1)
2017	Millonarios	8	(0)
2018	Sport Rosario	2	(1)
2018	Jaguares de Córdoba	4	(0)
2019	Alianza Universidad	11	(3)
2020	Santos de Nasca	0	(0)
2021-	Municipal Limeño	3	(1)
- * Club domestic league appearances and goals as of 3 March 2019

Róbinson Aponzá Carabalí (born 11 April 1989) is a Colombian professional footballer who plays as attacking midfielder for Municipal Limeño.

== Honours ==
=== Club ===
Deportes Tolima

- Copa Colombia (1): 2014

=== Individual ===
- Peruvian Primera División top scorer: 2016 Torneo Descentralizado
