= Amectran Exar-1 =

The Amectran Exar-1 was an electric sports car prototype developed by Edmond X. Ramirez, Sr. in 1979. The prototype was built by the Italian designer and coachbuilder Pietro Frua. The car was advertised by Amectran to be the "world's first production, electronic powered automobile". The car was highly praised before the prototype was finished by the United States Secretary of Transportation. However, the vehicle did not develop beyond a single prototype. Originally, BMW commissioned Pietro Frua to design the 1975 3.0Si concept for a 1975 autoshow. A few years later, he would reacquire the concept car and make minor changes to the car to support new electronics and a battery at the front. He then sent this chassis to Ramirez in Texas who began making it fully electric.
