= Alexis Ribera =

Bolivian footballer (born 1995)

Personal information
- Full name: Juan Alexis Ribera Castilla
- Date of birth: 15 August 1995 (age 31)
- Position: Midfielder

Team information
- Current team: Royal Pari F.C.

Senior career*
Years	Team	Apps	(Gls)
2013–2022	Oriente Petrolero	185	(17)
2023-2024	Royal Pari	54	(1)
2025-	GV San José	19	(1)

International career^{‡}
2018–	Bolivia	8	(0)
- * Club domestic league appearances and goals as of 00:15, 30 December 2025 (UTC) ‡ National team caps and goals as of 00:15, 15 April 2024 (UTC)

Juan Alexis Ribera Castillo (born 13 August 1995), better known as Alexis Ribera, is a Bolivian professional footballer who plays for GV San José in the Bolivian Primera División.

== Club career ==
Ribera played for Oriente Petrolero from 2015 until December 2022 and was at the club for ten years in total. In 2023, he joined Royal Pari.

He was announced as a new GV San José player in January 2025.

== International career ==
On 28 May 2018, he started for the Bolivia national football team against the United States national team in Pennsylvania.

== Style of play ==
A winger, he is said to be able to play on either flank.
