= Martín Giménez (footballer, born 1988) =

Argentine footballer

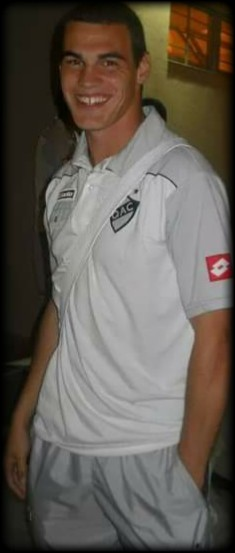

Personal information
- Full name: Martín Andrés Giménez
- Date of birth: 30 September 1988 (age 38)
- Place of birth: Buenos Aires, Argentina
- Position: Forward

Youth career
- 1999–2007: River Plate

Senior career*
Years	Team	Apps	(Gls)
2007–2008	Deportivo Armenio	?	(?)
2008–2009	Leandro N. Alem	?	(?)
2009–2010	Atlas	?	(?)
2010–2014	Quilmes	13	(0)
2014–2015	Tristán Suárez	2	(0)
2015	Santa Tecla	16	(4)
2016–2017	Fénix	32	(4)
2017–2018	All Boys	12	(1)
2019–2020	Colegiales	10	(0)
2020–2021	Gran Valencia	10	(0)
2021	CA Talleres RdE	0	(0)
2021–2023	Ierapetra	13	(2)
- * Club domestic league appearances and goals as of 1 May 2022

Martín Andrés Giménez (born 30 September 1988) is an Argentine professional footballer who plays as a forward.

== Career ==
Giménez started his career in the youth of River Plate, he remained there for eight years before starting his senior career with Deportivo Armenio in 2007. After time with Deportivo Armenio, Giménez had spells with Leandro N. Alem and Atlas. A move to Primera B Nacional team Quilmes followed, he made eleven appearances in the 2011–12 season as Quilmes won promotion to the 2012–13 Argentine Primera División. Two appearances came in Argentina's top-flight for him before he departed to join Tristán Suárez of Primera B Metropolitana, but he left soon after to sign for Salvadoran Primera División club Santa Tecla in 2015.

He left Santa Tecla at the end of the following Apertura campaign. In 2016, Giménez completed a move to Primera B Metropolitana side Fénix. After four goals in thirty-two appearances for Fénix in Primera B Metropolitana, Giménez departed to move up a division to join Primera B Nacional side All Boys in September 2017. He scored on his All Boys debut in November against Agropecuario. Giménez left in 2018, prior to joining Colegiales in January 2019. He left in the succeeding June, having appeared twelve times. Giménez subsequently joined amateur club Melmac FC.

== Career statistics ==
As of 10 October 2020.

Club statistics
Club	Season	League			Cup		Continental		Other		Total	
Club	Season	Division	Apps	Goals	Apps	Goals	Apps	Goals	Apps	Goals	Apps	Goals
Fénix	2016–17	Primera B Metropolitana	32	4	—		—		0	0	32	4
All Boys	2017–18	Primera B Nacional	12	1	0	0	—		0	0	12	1
Colegiales	2018–19	Primera B Metropolitana	10	0	0	0	—		2 (Note: Appearance(s) in the Primera B Metropolitana play-offs)	0	12	0
Career total			54	5	0	0	—		2	0	56	5
