= Kike Rodríguez =

Peruvian footballer (born 1991)

Personal information
- Full name: Kike Rodríguez Castillo
- Date of birth: September 6, 1991 (age 35)
- Place of birth: Santiago de Surco, Peru
- Height: 1.82 m (6 ft 0 in)
- Position: Centre back

Senior career*
| Years | Team | Apps | (Gls) |
| 2009 | La Peña Sporting | 2 | (0) |
| 2010–2012 | Colegio Nacional Iquitos | 40 | (0) |
| 2013–2016 | Los Caimanes | 23 | (0) |
| 2017 | Comerciantes Unidos | 23 | (1) |
| 2017 | Juan Aurich | 8 | (0) |
| 2018 | Carlos Stein | | |
| 2019 | Los Caimanes | 1 | (0) |
| 2019 | Pirata | 6 | (0) |
| 2020 | Sport San Francisco | | |
- * Club domestic league appearances and goals as of 6 December 2011

Kike Rodríguez Castillo (born September 6, 1991), commonly known as Kike Rodríguez, is a Peruvian footballer.

== Club career ==
Rodríguez started his career with a short spell with La Peña Sporting.

On January 28, 2010 it was announced that Rodríguez joined Colegio Nacional Iquitos, the biggest club of Iquitos. Kike made his official debut in the Peruvian First Division in Round 12 of the 2010 season at home against Cienciano. The manager Marcial Salazar allowed him to start from the beginning of the match, and he was partnered with Marcelo Zamora in the center of defence. He lasted the entire match, and with an early goal from Sergio Almirón the match finished 1–0 in favor of the Iquito's based club.
