= Maximiliano Cuadra =

Argentine professional footballer

Personal information
- Full name: Pablo Maximiliano Cuadra
- Date of birth: 6 June 1995 (age 31)
- Place of birth: San Nicolás de los Arroyos, Argentina
- Height: 1.72 m (5 ft 7 1/2 in)
- Position: Forward

Team information
- Current team: Zakynthos
- Number: 7

Youth career
- 2009–2017: Racing

Senior career*
Years	Team	Apps	(Gls)
2017–2021	Racing Club	33	(3)
2019	→ Unión Santa Fe (loan)	16	(0)
2020	→ Gimnasia LP (loan)	5	(0)
2020	→ Cobreloa (loan)	9	(5)
2021	Unión La Calera	0	(0)
2021	→ San Luis (loan)	11	(3)
2022–2023	Banfield	15	(1)
2023	Apollon Smyrnis	18	(5)
2023–2024	Levadiakos	18	(3)
2024	Magallanes	5	(1)
2025	Santiago Wanderers	19	(1)
2026	Deportes Temuco	10	(2)
2026–	Zakynthos	3	(0)
- * Club domestic league appearances and goals as of 19 September 2026

Pablo Maximiliano Cuadra (born 6 June 1995), known as Maximiliano Cuadra or Maxi Cuadra, is an Argentine professional footballer who plays as a forward for Greek club Zakynthos.

== Career ==
Cuadra was promoted into Racing Club's senior squad in 2017, following eight years in the youth system. He made his professional debut on 12 March during a 3–0 win versus Lanús. Three appearances later, Cuadra scored for the first time by netting the winning goal in a 2–3 win away to Quilmes. Overall, he scored two goals in seventeen matches in all competitions throughout his first campaign. In that period, on 1 June 2017, Cuadra scored on his continental debut against Rionegro Águilas in the Copa Sudamericana. In January 2019, Cuadra joined Unión Santa Fe on loan. On 17 January 2020, he then joined Gimnasia La Plata on loan until 30 June 2020.

After playing for Cobreloa in the Primera B de Chile, on second half 2021 he returned to the Chilean football and joined Unión La Calera, being loaned to San Luis de Quillota.

On 9 February 2022, Cuadra joined Banfield on a deal until the end of the year.

In the second half of 2024, Cuadra returned to Chile from Greece and joined Magallanes. The next year, he switched to Santiago Wanderers. He joined Deportes Temuco for the 2026 season and ended his contract on 29 July of the same year.

On 1 August 2026, Cuadra signed with Greek club Zakynthos.

== Career statistics ==
As of 17 January 2019.

Club statistics
Club	Season	League			Cup		Continental		Other		Total	
Club	Season	Division	Apps	Goals	Apps	Goals	Apps	Goals	Apps	Goals	Apps	Goals
Racing Club	2016–17	Primera División	15	1	0	0	2 (Note: Appearance(s) in the Copa Sudamericana)	1	0	0	17	2
Racing Club	2017–18	Primera División	13	1	3	0	4 (Note: Appearance(s) in the Copa Libertadores and Copa Sudamericana)	1	0	0	20	2
Racing Club	2018–19	Primera División	4	1	0	0	1 (Note: Appearance(s) in the Copa Libertadores)	0	0	0	5	1
Racing Club	Total		32	3	3	0	7	2	0	0	42	5
Unión Santa Fe (loan)	2018–19	Primera División	0	0	0	0	0	0	0	0	0	0
Career total			32	3	3	0	7	2	0	0	42	5
