= Martín Giménez (footballer, born 1991) =

Argentine footballer

Personal information
- Full name: Martín José Giménez
- Date of birth: 17 August 1991 (age 35)
- Place of birth: Zárate, Argentina
- Height: 1.92 m (6 ft 3 1/2 in)
- Position: Forward

Team information
- Current team: Defensores Unidos

Senior career*
| Years | Team | Apps | (Gls) |
| 2006–2009 | Deportivo Independencia | | |
| 2009–2011 | Atlas | 33 | (4) |
| 2010 | → Defensores Unidos (loan) | | |
| 2011–2012 | Quilmes | 12 | (0) |
| 2012–2015 | Defensores Unidos | | |
| 2015–2017 | Unión San Felipe | 2 | (0) |
| 2016 | → Defensores Unidos (loan) | | |
| 2016 | → Arsenal de Sarandí (loan) | 10 | (1) |
| 2017–2019 | Sol de América | 56 | (12) |
| 2019 | → Defensores Unidos (loan) | 5 | (0) |
| 2020 | Atyrá FC | 0 | (0) |
| 2020 | San Lorenzo | 5 | (0) |
| 2021 | Almirante Brown | 5 | (0) |
| 2022 | Deportivo Capiatá | 8 | (4) |
| 2022–2023 | Defensores Unidos | 50 | (14) |
| 2023–2024 | Quilmes | 22 | (5) |
| 2024– | Defensores Unidos | 23 | (7) |
- * Club domestic league appearances and goals as of 17:52, 30 July 2025 (UTC)

Martín José Giménez (born 17 August 1991) is an Argentine professional footballer who plays as a forward for Defensores Unidos.

== Career ==
Giménez's career began in 2006 with Deportivo Independencia, before a spell with Primera D team Atlas where he was loaned out to Defensores Unidos. After his loan with Defensores Unidos, Giménez joined Quilmes of Primera B Nacional before subsequently joining Defensores Unidos permanently. After three years at the club, he completed a move to Primera B de Chile side Unión San Felipe. Not long after joining Unión San Felipe, Giménez found himself out on loan to former club Defensores Unidos for the 2016 Primera C season. In three spells, he scored twenty-six times in one hundred and seven games.

After the 2016 campaign, Giménez joined Argentine Primera División club Arsenal de Sarandí on loan for the 2016–17 season. He returned to Unión San Felipe at the end of December 2016. On 16 February 2017, Giménez joined Paraguayan Primera División side Sol de América. He made his debut for the club on 25 February in the league against Cerro Porteño, he scored a hat-trick in an away win. Giménez made his Copa Sudamericana debut on 7 April, scoring two goals in a win versus Estudiantes. His time with them was littered with indiscipline, with the forward going AWOL on three occasions.

In August 2019, Giménez was loaned back to his hometown with Defensores Unidos; for his fourth spell with the Zárate-based outfit. On 16 March 2020, Giménez joined Paraguayan División Intermedia club Atyrá FC. He never appeared for them due to the COVID-19 pandemic. Within the next few months, Giménez signed a pre-contract with Brazilian Série B outfit Náutico. However, on 2 September, the move fell through after the forward asked for a pay increase. Giménez subsequently went back to Paraguay, penning terms with Primera División team San Lorenzo on 6 October.

On 22 January 2021, Giménez returned to Argentina with Primera B Metropolitana's Almirante Brown. Giménez left Almirante a year later to join Defensores Unidos on 5 January 2022.

== Career statistics ==
As of 22 January 2021.

Club statistics
| Club | Season | League | | | Cup | | League Cup | | Continental | | Other | | Total | |
| Club | Season | Division | Apps | Goals | Apps | Goals | Apps | Goals | Apps | Goals | Apps | Goals | Apps | Goals |
|---|---|---|---|---|---|---|---|---|---|---|---|---|---|---|
| Sol de América | 2017 | Primera División | 30 | 8 | — | | — | | 4 (Note: Appearance(s) in the Copa Sudamericana) | 3 | 0 | 0 | 34 | 11 |
| Sol de América | 2018 | Primera División | 18 | 3 | 0 | 0 | — | | 4 | 0 | 0 | 0 | 22 | 3 |
| Sol de América | 2019 | Primera División | 8 | 1 | 0 | 0 | — | | 1 | 0 | 0 | 0 | 9 | 1 |
| Sol de América | Total | | 56 | 12 | 0 | 0 | — | | 9 | 3 | 0 | 0 | 65 | 15 |
| Defensores Unidos (loan) | 2019–20 | Primera B Metropolitana | 5 | 0 | 0 | 0 | — | | — | | 0 | 0 | 5 | 0 |
| Atyrá FC | 2020 | División Intermedia | 0 | 0 | 0 | 0 | — | | — | | 0 | 0 | 0 | 0 |
| San Lorenzo | 2020 | Primera División | 5 | 0 | 0 | 0 | — | | — | | 0 | 0 | 5 | 0 |
| Almirante Brown | 2021 | Primera B Metropolitana | 0 | 0 | 0 | 0 | — | | — | | 0 | 0 | 0 | 0 |
| Career total | | | 66 | 12 | 0 | 0 | — | | 9 | 3 | 0 | 0 | 75 | 15 |
