= Javier Vatter =

Argentine footballer (born 1990)

Personal information
- Full name: Héctor Javier Vatter
- Date of birth: 14 December 1990 (age 35)
- Place of birth: Buenos Aires, Argentina
- Height: 1.78 m (5 ft 10 in)
- Position: Attacking midfielder

Team information
- Current team: River Plate (futsal)

Youth career
- Argentinos Juniors (futsal)
- Comunicaciones

Senior career*
Years	Team	Apps	(Gls)
2006–2007	Argentinos Juniors (futsal)		
2008–2010	Comunicaciones	59	(5)
2010–2011	Deportes La Serena	18	(1)
2011	Rangers	29	(12)
2012	Unión San Felipe	9	(0)
2012	Unión San Felipe B	2	(0)
2012	Everton	10	(0)
2013	Deportes Concepción	11	(2)
2013	Aldosivi	1	(0)
2014	12 de Octubre	0	(0)
2014–2017	Comunicaciones	82	(7)
2017–2018	Tristán Suárez	16	(0)
2018	Boca Juniors (futsal)		
2019–2022	Pinocho (futsal)		
2021–2023	SECLA (futsal)		
2024–	River Plate (futsal)		
- * Club domestic league appearances and goals as of 20 September 2024

Héctor Javier Vatter (born 14 December 1990) is an Argentine futsal player who plays as a winger and a former football attacking midfielder. He is currently a player of River Plate.

== Football career ==
Vatter began playing football for Club Comunicaciones in Argentina. In June 2010, he went to Chile for an unsuccessful trial with Deportes Concepción. Rival Chilean Primera División B club Deportes La Serena signed him in July 2010.

In Chile, Vatter also played for Rangers, Unión San Felipe, Everton and Deportes Concepción.

Back in Argentina, Vatter signed with Aldosivi in the second half of 2013. The next year, he switched to Comunicaciones.

His last club was Tristán Suárez in 2017–18.

== Futsal career ==
At the same time Vatter was a youth player of Comunicaciones, he was a futsal player of Argentinos Juniors, with whom he made his debut at the age of 16. A year later, he was called up to the Argentina national futsal team for the 2008 FIFA Futsal World Cup qualifiers.

Following Tristán Suárez, Vatter returned to play futsal and signed with Boca Juniors in June 2018. Subsequently, he played for Pinocho and SECLA.

In 2024, Vatter joined River Plate.
