= Exar Rosales =

Peruvian footballer (born 1984)

Personal information
- Full name: Exar Javier Rosales Sánchez
- Date of birth: 20 May 1984 (age 42)
- Place of birth: Lima, Peru
- Height: 1.81 m (5 ft 11 in)
- Position: Goalkeeper

Youth career
- Academia Cantolao
- Alianza Lima

Senior career*
Years	Team	Apps	(Gls)
2003–2004	Alianza Lima		
2005	Deportivo Municipal		
2006	Unión Huaral		
2006	Universidad San Marcos		
2007	Sport Boys		
2007	Juan Aurich		
2008	Atlético Minero		
2008	Sport Boys		
2009–2011	Cienciano	8	(0)
2012–2013	Los Caimanes	12	(2)
2013	Atlético Minero	11	(1)
2014	Municipal	24	(4)
2015–2017	Comerciantes Unidos	88	(14)
2018	Juan Aurich	30	(4)
2019–2020	Ayacucho	35	(0)
2020–2021	Unión Comercio	19	(0)

International career
2003	Peru U-17	8	(0)
- * Club domestic league appearances and goals as of 1 September 2020

Exar Javier Rosales Sánchez (born 20 May 1984) is a Peruvian footballer. He is a goalscoring goalkeeper, and takes penalties for many of his sides. He is currently serving a match-fixing ban which is in place until 2031.

== International career ==
The goalkeeper is former member of the Peru national under-17 football team and presented his team at 2003 XXI Sudamericano Juvenil in Uruguay.
